= List of New Zealand child actors =

This is a list of child actors from New Zealand. These child actors are or were aged 19 or less at the time they started acting. The list also includes deceased child actors.

Movies and/or TV series they appeared in (or are appearing in) are mentioned only if they were still a child at the time of filming.

== A ==
- Beth Allen (born 1984)
  - The Ugly (1997)
  - The Legend of William Tell (1998)
  - Xena: Warrior Princess (1999)
  - A Twist in the Tale (1999)
  - The Tribe (1999, 2001-2003)
  - Revelations – The Initial Journey (1 episode, 2002)
  - Murder in Greenwich (2002)
- Michelle Ang (born 1983)
  - Young Entertainers (1997)
  - A Twist in the Tale (1999)
  - The Tribe (1999-2001)
  - Xena: Warrior Princess (2001)
  - Being Eve (2002)
  - Neighbours (2002-2004)

== B ==
- Ari Boyland (born 1987)
  - The Tribe (1999-2001, 2003)
  - Revelations – The Initial Journey (2002)
  - You Wish! (2004)

== C ==
- Dwayne Cameron (born 1981)
  - Amazon High (1997)
  - One of Them (1998)
  - The Tribe (1999-2003)
- Meryl Cassie (born 1984)
  - The Tribe (1999-2003)
- Keisha Castle-Hughes (born 1990)
  - Whale Rider (2002)
  - Star Wars: Episode III – Revenge of the Sith (2005)
  - The Nativity Story (2006)
  - Hey, Hey, It's Esther Blueburger (2008)
  - The Vintner's Luck (2009)
  - Piece of My Heart (2009)
  - Legend of the Seeker (1 episode, 2010)
- Beth Chote (born 1991)
  - The Tribe (2003)
  - The Killian Curse (2006)
- Russell Crowe (born 1964)
  - Spyforce (1972)
  - The Young Doctors (1977)
  - The New Tomorrow (2005)
  - Paradise Café (2009)
- Rafe Custance (born 1994)
  - The New Tomorrow (2005)

== D ==
- David de Lautour (born 1982)
  - Xena: Warrior Princess (1996, 1999)
  - Xena: Warrior Princess (15 episodes, 2001-2002)
- Julian Dennison (born 2002)
  - Shopping (2013)
  - Paper Planes (2015)
  - Hunt for the Wilderpeople (2016)
  - Deadpool 2 (2018)
  - The Strange Chores (2019–present)
  - The Christmas Chronicles 2 (2020)
  - Godzilla vs. Kong (2021)
- Amie Donald (born 2010)
  - Sweet Tooth (2021)
  - M3GAN (2022)
  - M3GAN 2.0 (2025)

== J ==
- Jennyfer Jewell (born 1984)
  - The Enid Blyton Adventure Series (1996)
  - The Enid Blyton Secret Series (1997-1998)
  - The Tribe (1999-2003)

== K ==
- Jaimee Kaire-Gataulu (born 1987)
  - The Tribe (1999-2002)

== L ==
- Daniel Logan (born 1987)
  - Shortland Street (1998)
  - Hercules: The Legendary Journeys (1999)
  - Star Wars: Episode II – Attack of the Clones (2002)
  - The Legend of Johnny Lingo (2003)

== M ==
- Sarah Major (born 1988)
  - Flying (1998)
  - Hercules: The Legendary Journeys (1998)
  - A Twist in the Tale (1999)
  - The Tribe (1999-2001)
- Rose McIver (born 1988)
  - The Piano (1993)
  - Shortland Street (1993)
  - Riding High (1995)
  - Hercules: The Legendary Journeys (1994, 1995, 1997)
  - City Life (1996)
  - Topless Women Talk About Their Lives (1997)
  - Flying (1998)
  - Making the Rain Breathe (1998)
  - Xena: Warrior Princess (1999)
  - Ozzie (2001)
  - Mercy Peak (2002)
  - Toy Love (2002)
  - Murder in Greenwich (2002)
  - P.E.T. Detectives (2003)
  - Eddie's Million Dollar Cook-Off (2003)
  - Maiden Voyage (2004)
  - Amazing Extraordinary Friends (2006)
  - Maddigan's Quest (2006)
  - Rude Awakenings (2007)
  - Knickers (2007)
  - Johnny Kapahala: Back on Board (2007)
  - So Fresh & So Keen (2008)
  - Legend of the Seeker (1 episode, 2009)
  - Power Rangers RPM (2009)
- Thomasin McKenzie (born 2000)
  - Consent: The Louise Nicholas Story (2014)
  - The Hobbit: The Battle of the Five Armies (2014)
  - End of Term (1 episode, 2015)
  - Shortland Street (2015-2020)
  - Bright Summer Night (4 episodes, 2016)
  - Jean (2016)
  - Lucy Lewis Can't Lose (2016-2017)
  - The Cul De Sac (3 episodes, 2017)
  - Leave No Trace (2018)
  - The King (2019)
  - Jojo Rabbit (2019)
  - True History of the Kelly Gang (2019)
  - Lost Girls (2020)
- Amy Morrison (born 1984)
  - Jack Be Nimble (1993)
  - Hercules: The Legendary Journeys (1994, 1998)
  - Every Woman's Dream (1996)
  - Xena: Warrior Princess (1998)
  - A Twist in the Tale (1999)
  - The Tribe (1999)
  - Jack of All Trades (2000)
- Temuera Morrison (born 1960)
  - Rangi's Catch (1972)

== P ==
- Anna Paquin (born 1982)
  - The Piano (1993)
  - Jane Eyre (1996)
  - Fly Away Home (1996)
  - The Member of the Wedding (1997)
  - Amistad (1997)
  - Hurlyburly (1998)
  - It's the Rage (1999)
  - She's All That (1999)
  - A Walk on the Moon (1999)
  - X-Men (2000)
  - Almost Famous (2000)
  - Finding Forrester (2000)
  - Buffalo Soldiers (2001)
  - Darkness (2002)
  - 25th Hour (2002)
- Antonia Prebble (born 1984)
  - Mirror, Mirror II (1997)
  - A Twist in the Tale (1999)
  - The Tribe (1999-2003)
  - Dark Knight (2001)
  - Power Rangers Dino Thunder (2 episodes, 2004)

== R ==
- Jodie Rimmer (born 1974)
  - The New Adventures of Black Beauty (1990)
  - The Rogue Stallion (1990)
  - Melody Rules (3 episodes, 1993-1995)
  - Shortland Street (1994)
- Vicky Rodewyk (born 1988)
  - Hercules: The Legendary Journeys (1998)
  - Revelations – The Initial Journey (2002)
  - The Tribe (2003)
- Caleb Ross (born 1981)
  - Hercules: The Legendary Journeys (1997)
  - Xena: Warrior Princess (1998)
  - Shortland Street (1998)
  - The Tribe (1999-2003)
- Ryan Runciman (born 1982)
  - The Enid Blyton Adventure Series (1996)
  - Mirror, Mirror II (1997)
  - A Twist in the Tale (1999)
  - The Tribe (1999-2001)

== S ==
- Fleur Saville (born 1984)
  - Being Eve (2000-2002)
  - The Tribe (2003)
  - Serial Killers (2004)
- Ronald Sinclair (1924-1992)
  - Beloved Enemy (1936)
  - A Doctor's Diary (1937)
  - Dangerous Holiday (1937)
  - Boots and Saddles (1937)
  - Thoroughbreds Don't Cry (1937)
  - A Christmas Carol (1938)
  - Five Little Peppers and How They Grew (1939)
  - Tower of London (1939)
  - The Light that Failed (1939)
  - The Earl of Chicago (1940)
  - Five Little Peppers at Home (1940)
  - Out West with the Peppers (1940)
  - Five Little Peppers in Trouble (1940)
  - That Hamilton Woman (1941)
  - Desperate Journey (1942)
- Victoria Spence (born 1984)
  - Jack Be Nimble (1993)
  - A Twist in the Tale (1999)
  - The Tribe (1999-2003)
  - Atlantis High (2001)
  - The Tribe (1999-2000)

== T ==
- Anton Tennet (born 1987)
  - Ozzie (2001)
  - Her Majesty (2001)
  - Kids World (2001)
  - Grace (2002)
  - Mercy Peak (2003)
  - Maiden Voyage (2004)
  - Power Rangers: Dino Thunder (2004)
  - Outrageous Fortune (2005)
  - September (2007)
- Olivia Tennet (born 1991)
  - Xena: Warrior Princess (1999)
  - Ozzie (2001)
  - Kids World (2001)
  - Watermark (2002)
  - The Lord of the Rings: The Two Towers (2002)
  - P.E.T. Detectives (2004)
  - Boogeyman (2005)
  - Maddigan's Quest (2006)
  - Shortland Street (2007-2008)
  - Power Rangers: RPM (2009)
  - The Almighty Johnsons (2011)
  - Underbelly NZ: Land of the Long Green Cloud (2011)

== W ==
- Dan Weekes-Hannah (born 1987)
  - The Tribe (2002)
- Michael Wesley-Smith (born 1983)
  - The Legend of William Tell (1998)
  - The Tribe (1999-2003)
- Laura Wilson (born 1983)
  - The Tribe (2000-2003)
