= List of The Tribe seasons =

The Tribe is a New Zealand–British post-apocalyptic fictional television series primarily aimed at teenagers. The series aired from 24 April 1999 to 6 September 2003 on Channel 5 in the United Kingdom. Five series of The Tribe were produced, with 52 unnamed episodes per series, amounting to 260 half-hour episodes over its entire run. The first series mainly focuses on the tribe of the Mall Rats and their life in the Mall, with later series exploring other locations in and around the City. Most characters appear in more than one series, however each series have a different story where the Mall Rats have to overcome a problem or defeat an enemy Tribe.

== Series overview ==
Series	Episodes	Originally released	
Series	Episodes	First released	Last released
1	52	24 April 1999	23 October 1999
2	52	14 November 1999	6 May 2000
3	52	18 November 2000	11 May 2001
4	52	5 January 2002	6 July 2002
5	52	15 March 2003	6 September 2003

== Series 1 (1999) ==
Series 1 of the television series The Tribe was first broadcast from 24 April 1999 to 23 October 1999 on Five in the UK.

It starts about six to nine months after a deadly Virus has killed all the adults.

A group of children take refuge in a Mall in an unnamed City and form a Tribe, the Mall Rats. Series 1 mainly takes place in the Mall, where the new Tribe learns to deal with everyday problems. The main opponents of the Mall Rats during Series 1 are the Locos.

At the beginning of Series 1, we are introduced to the strong-willed, responsible leader Amber and her younger friend, aspiring doctor/mechanic Dal. They find a little girl called Cloe wandering the dangerous streets, then meet cute kids, twins Patsy and Paul who are being looked after by Salene. A peace-loving loner, Bray, is taking care of the heavily pregnant Trudy and looking for a place for her to give birth. Arrogant street fighter Lex, his sweet if slow friend Ryan, Lex's material girl Zandra and confrontational Glen are trying to join the top Tribe in the City, the Locusts (or Locos) led by Zoot and Ebony. In one way or another, all end up in the Phoenix Shopping Mall (bar Glen who got caught by the Locos) and meet Jack, the boy scientist who lives there alone. Soon, Asian spiritualist Tai-San and slippery young thief KC also join the Tribe.

A multitude of serious subjects are tackled in Series 1. There is a power struggle from the start in the Mall between Lex, Amber and Bray, and on the outside, between the Locos and Demon Dogs for the City. Lex kills Zoot, who turns out to be the father of Trudy's baby and Bray's kid brother (his real name is Martin, a play on words for 'martyr'). Lex tries to rape Zandra, but she ends up marrying him later anyway. Salene has bulimia, only beating it with Ryan's help.

Jealousy is rife in the Mall - Lex of Zandra and Ryan's friendship, Zandra of Lex's trysts with Tai-San and Ebony, Trudy of Bray and Salene, and later Bray and Amber. The virus begins to affect kids later in the series and Lex is infected with it just when his new wife Zandra tells him she is pregnant. Bray and Amber finally find love with each other after an iffy start. The Tribe goes on a quest for the antidote at the end of the series, and the finale shows them finding pivotal information at the Eagle Mountain Observatory.

=== Characters ===
- Amber - Beth Allen
- Bray - Dwayne Cameron
- Cloe - Jaimee Kaire-Gataulu
- Dal - Ashwath Sundarasen
- Ebony - Meryl Cassie
- Jack - Michael Wesley-Smith
- KC - Ari Boyland
- Lex - Caleb Ross
- Patsy - Sarah Major
- Ryan - Ryan Runciman
- Salene - Victoria Spence
- Tai-San - Michelle Ang
- Trudy - Antonia Prebble
- Zandra - Amy Morrison

== Series 2 (1999–2000) ==
Series 2 of the television series The Tribe was first broadcast from 11 November 1999 to 6 May 2000 on Five in the UK.

It starts right as the Mall Rats deal with the loss of Amber and Zandra in the explosion on Eagle Mountain. Series 2 mainly deals with the struggle of the Mall Rats to unite the Tribes of the City and their effort to produce an antidote for the Virus. As the Tribes ally themselves, a new unknown enemy, later revealed to be the Chosen, gradually takes power over the City.

Series 2 begins on Eagle Mountain, just as a generator catches fire in the building. Amber and a pregnant Zandra die in the explosion that follows. The Mall Rats are distraught, but still end up deciding to stay together and find another antidote before they get wiped out.

After finding the formula, Tai-San becomes the only one who knows how to make the antidote. The Mall Rats take advantage of their new position of power and try to instate peace in the city. Danni joins them and tries to set up a Bill of Rights in an effort to unite all the tribes. Lex and Alice, Tai-San's new bodyguard, supervise the security of the trading market that is installed in the mall. Jack and Ellie work together on finding more information about the origins of the virus and create a newssheet for the city, called The Amulet. When the Mall Rats discover they don't need the antidote any more, they fear the city will descend into chaos again.

The Mall Rats are confronted by the mysterious tribe of the Chosen, led by The Guardian, that worships Zoot as a God. They kidnap Brady and Trudy to complete their Holy Trinity. Unknown to the others, when Trudy comes back a few months later, the Chosen have brainwashed her into secretly working on taking over the whole city with them. They abduct people and make sure the Mall Rats believe Ebony is behind the kidnappings. Alice and Ebony try to warn the Mall Rats, but the Chosen invade the city and take everyone prisoner in the mall.

=== Characters ===
- Alice - Vanessa Stacey
- Bray - Dwayne Cameron
- Cloe - Jaimee Kaire-Gataulu
- Dal - Ashwath Sundarasen
- Danni - Ella Wilks
- Ebony - Meryl Cassie
- Ellie - Jennyfer Jewell
- The Guardian - Damon Andrews
- Jack - Michael Wesley-Smith
- KC - Ari Boyland
- Lex - Caleb Ross
- Patsy - Sarah Major
- Ryan - Ryan Runciman
- Salene - Victoria Spence
- Tai-San - Michelle Ang
- Trudy - Antonia Prebble

== Series 3 (2000–2001) ==
Series 3 of the television series The Tribe was first broadcast from 18 November 2000 to 11 May 2001 on Five in the UK.

At the beginning of Series 3, the Guardian and the Supreme Mother, Trudy, have taken control over the mall. Ebony, Lex and Bray escaped and are now in the woods working on a plan to save all the Mall Rats, who must either join the Chosen or work as slaves. Jack is taken away when he tries to find an escape for his friends. Ebony and Lex meet Pride, who takes them back to his tribe the Ecos. Their leader is Eagle, later revealed to be Amber, whose death was faked by Ebony back on Eagle Mountain. Pride later rescues Bray and Dal from the Chosen. Although reluctant to join the fight against the Chosen at first, Amber changes her mind after the death of her best friend, Dal, who tried to escape from the Chosen. The rebels rescue Trudy from the mind-controlling Guardian and recruit numerous tribes to help them win the battle.

Inside the Mall, Patsy joins the Chosen as a spy and so does Cloe, but ends up getting sent away when they are discovered. Alice convinces Ellie to get closer to Luke, The Guardian's lieutenant, in order to overthrow the Chosen. Ryan refuses to let the Chosen control his life and gets taken away. Salene, afraid for the life of her unborn baby, agrees to follow their orders but suffers a miscarriage after falling down the stairs.

The Guardian decides it is Zoot's will that Tai-San should be the New True Supreme Mother, after Trudy is named an imposter when the rebels save her from execution; when Lex finds out he tries to kill The Guardian at her coronation.

When Bray tries to pull him back, he accidentally shoots Tai-San and mistakenly believes she is dead. At the end of Series 3, the rebels storm the mall and defeat the Chosen. The Guardian is imprisoned, but the city leaders disagree over what must be done with him. Ebony is elected as city leader. When Bray and Amber (who is pregnant) refuse to let her execute The Guardian, she banishes them just as a mysterious plane approaches the city. Jack returns to find Luke and Ellie are together. After witnessing them kissing he chooses to leave, but soon returns with Cloe.

=== Characters ===
- Alice - Vanessa Stacey
- Amber / Eagle - Beth Allen
- Andy - James Ordish
- Bray - Dwayne Cameron
- Ebony - Meryl Cassie
- Ellie - Jennyfer Jewell
- The Guardian - Damon Andrews
- KC - Ari Boyland
- Lex - Caleb Ross
- Luke - Jacob Tomuri
- May - Laura Wilson
- Ned - Bevin Linkhorn
- Pride - Nick Miller
- Salene - Victoria Spence
- Tai-San - Michelle Ang
- Tally - Amelia Reynolds
- Trudy - Antonia Prebble

== Series 4 (2002) ==
Series 4 of the television series The Tribe was first broadcast from 5 January 2002 to 6 July 2002 on Five in the UK.

Series 4 begins just as the Technos are starting their invasion. They possess advanced technology and the mall rats are helpless against them. They raid the mall and take Alice, KC, Tai-San and May away to work in their labour camps. Cloe is the only one left in the mall after she hid from the Technos. She becomes distressed and finds comfort in Pride and later develops feelings for him, which he cannot return due to her age. While trying to overthrow the Technos, Jack is captured and taken away as well. Bray is taken while Amber is about to give birth. Trudy finds her and they rejoin the Eco tribe with their babies. Ellie and Jack rescue a former 'Mosquito' (a minor, all-girl Tribe) Dee from the Technos when she is zapped by their weapons.

Ebony tries to make a deal with the Technos' general, Jay, in order to hold a little power in the city. Ellie, blaming Ebony for Jack's capture, attempts to kill her and is sent away to a labour camp. The Technos seem to want to bring progress and order to the city. However, in secret, their leader, Ram, is experimenting a new virtual game on people with the help of Jay's brother, Ved. Ved starts a relationship with Mall Rat Cloe but when she tells him she is pregnant, he immediately dumps her. Amber becomes unwillingly addicted to the game and realises the Technos must be stopped. She asks an initially reluctant Cloe to get information from Ved, but Cloe later agrees, getting Ved drunk and taking advantage of him by receiving the password for his computer. Ebony reluctantly agrees to marry Ram, but ends up betraying him and escapes the city with Jay, who has come to realise what Ram's real plans are. Cloe becomes addicted to reality space and whilst playing the game, vanishes. Ved is distraught as he actually loved her. He fights Ram in reality space to get her back but loses and is later deleted. The Mall Rats succeed in defeating Ram by imprisoning him in virtual reality, with the help of Ram's lieutenant, Mega.

=== Characters ===
- Amber - Beth Allen
- Cloe - Jaimee Kaire-Gataulu
- Dee - Kelly Stevenson
- Ebony - Meryl Cassie
- Java - Megan Alatini
- Jay - James Napier
- Lex - Caleb Ross
- Mouse - Jacinta Wawatai
- Patch - Morgan Palmer Hubbard
- Pride - Nick Miller
- Ram - Tom Hern
- Salene - Victoria Spence
- Sammy - Lucas Hayward
- Siva - Monique Cassie
- Trudy - Antonia Prebble
- Ved - Dan Weekes-Hannah

== Series 5 (2003) ==
Series 5 of the television series The Tribe was first broadcast from 15 March 2003 to 6 September 2003 on Five in the UK.

In Series 5, Mega becomes the new leader of the Technos. He has plans to take over the city and is helped by Java, who manipulates Ebony's mind with virtual reality. Ebony, believing Zoot has come back, with her sisters, Java and Siva, create a new tribe, the Zootists, and take control of the outside of the city. The Mall Rats try to find out what happened to all of their friends who disappeared when the Technos invaded, and Amber is distraught to learn Bray was deleted. Lex, meanwhile, desperately searches for Tai-San.

Drifter Slade rescues Ram and brings him to the country town of Liberty. He hopes Ram will be able to help him defeat Mega. Jack is released and comes back to the Mall, where everyone is trying to adjust to Mega's new rules. Every citizen must take part in the work labour done for the city and be branded with a barcode in order to be identified. Jack and Ellie are reunited. New Mall Rat and stereotypical girl Gel loves Jack, but Jack wants to be with Ellie, and vice versa.

Amber and Jay start having doubts about Mega's intentions when he threatens her son, Bray Jr. They secretly conspire against him, with the help of Ellie and Jack, who volunteers to go work with Mega. Ebony realises Java is manipulating her and leaves the Zootists. She joins Slade in Liberty and helps with the rebellion. Jack steals information from Mega's computer and flees to Liberty where, with the help of Ram, he disables the city's security. The rebels attack the City and Mega is captured.

Ram takes control of Mega's computer and installs his own artificial program. However, the program becomes uncontrollable and threatens to release a new deadly virus on the city. Mega dies while trying to stop the program but is unsuccessful and the Mall Rats inform everyone they must evacuate the city. The Mall Rats escape on a boat while the virus spreads throughout the city.

=== Characters ===
- Amber - Beth Allen
- Darryl - Joseph Crawford
- Ebony - Meryl Cassie
- Ellie - Jennyfer Jewell
- Gel - Vicky Rodewyk
- Jack - Michael Wesley-Smith
- Java - Megan Alatini
- Jay - James Napier
- Lex - Caleb Ross
- Lottie - Beth Chote
- May - Laura Wilson
- Mega - Calen Maiava-Paris
- Mouse - Jacinta Wawatai
- Ram - Tom Hern
- Ruby - Fleur Saville
- Salene - Victoria Spence
- Sammy - Lucas Hayward
- Siva - Monique Cassie
- Slade - Matt Robinson
- Trudy - Antonia Prebble

== Home media releases ==
Season	Set details	DVD release dates			Special features
Season	Set details	Region 2	Region 4	Region 1	Special features
1	Discs: 7; Episodes: 52; 1.77:1 (16:9) aspect ratio	27 February 2006 (UK); 31 March 2006 (Europe)	3 March 2011 (Australia)	13 March 2012 (US, part 1); 12 June 2012 (US, part 2)	"The Making Of" featurette; "The Tribe on Tour" featurette; Bloopers; Character profiles
2	Discs: 7; Episodes: 52; 1.77:1 (16:9) aspect ratio	27 February 2006 (UK)	—N/a	—N/a	"The Tribe on Tour 2003" featurette; Bloopers; Character profiles
3	Discs: 7; Episodes: 52; 1.77:1 (16:9) aspect ratio	22 May 2006 (UK)	—N/a	—N/a	"Tribe Tour: Summer 2003" featurette; Photograph gallery
4	Discs: 7; Episodes: 52; 1.77:1 (16:9) aspect ratio	21 August 2006 (UK)	—N/a	—N/a	Photograph gallery
5	Discs: 7; Episodes: 52; 1.77:1 (16:9) aspect ratio	20 November 2006 (UK)	—N/a	—N/a	Photograph gallery; Series 6 scripts: Episodes 1–2; Laura Wilson (May) Interview
