= Paige Shand-Haami =

New Zealand actress

- Occupation: Actress
- Years active: 2003–present

Paige Shand-Haami is a film and television actress.

== Career ==
She appeared as Cass in the television series The New Tomorrow (2005), a sequel to The Tribe television series. She has also appeared in two films.

== Filmography ==
- Water (2004) as Mary
- The Tub (2005) as Mary
