= The Last Dogs of Winter =

- ‘The Last Dogs of Winter’ starring Caleb Ross and Costa Botes
- Directed by: Costa Botes
- Produced by: Costa Botes Caleb Ross
- Starring: Caleb Ross Brian Ladoon Costa Botes
- Cinematography: Costa Botes
- Edited by: Costa Botes
- Music by: Tom McLeod
- Distributed by: New Zealand Film Commission
- Release date: 12 September 2011
- Running time: 97 minutes
- Countries: Canada; New Zealand
- Language: English

The Last Dogs of Winter is a 2011 Canadian and New Zealand documentary film, directed by Costa Botes and starring The Tribe star Caleb Ross. The documentary follows Caleb Ross and Brian Ladoon as they explore the decreasing numbers of the famed Canadian Eskimo Dog and Brian Ladoon’s attempts the revive the species.

== Festival run ==
The documentary premiered at the Toronto International Film Festival in September 2011, played at the New Zealand International Film Festival before going on a successful Film festival run between 2011-2012. Most notably, it won an award for “Best Canadian Documentary” at the Toronto International Film Festival. Other achievements include being nominated at the likes of The International Documentary Film Festival Amsterdam, HOLA Aunz Film Festival and Sydney Film Festival.

== Critical reception ==
The documentary was received positively with Variety (magazine) stating the documentary was an "Intimate, gorgeously rendered docu intelligently surveys one man's quixotic mission, the numerous obstacles he faces and the uneasy co-existence of man, animal and nature in a small town. A wilderness lover's delight."
