= Amy Morrison (disambiguation) =

Amy Morrison is an actress.

Amy Morrison may also refer to:

- Amy Morrison, character in Alex in Wonderland
- Amy Morrison (soccer), player for Butler Bulldogs women's soccer
