= Victoria Spence =

New Zealand actress (born 1984)

- Born: Victoria Anne Spence; 30 April 1984 (age 42); Auckland, New Zealand
- Other name: Tori Spence
- Occupations: Stage and television actress
- Years active: 1993; 1999–present

Victoria "Tori" Spence (born 30 April 1984) is a New Zealand stage and television actress most famous for her role as Salene in the Cloud 9 television drama The Tribe. She made her acting debut in the 1993 film Jack Be Nimble and later appeared in the teen comedy series Atlantis High, in which she played the dual role of Antonia and Anthony, and William Shatner's A Twist in the Tale alongside Tribe co-star Ryan Runciman.

While attending high school, she appeared in several plays including a leading role in The Joker as well as supporting roles in Memory, Moon Launcher, Desire, Shortland Street, Sticky TV and Mother Tongue. Spence also starred in several television commercials and had experience as a stills photographic model prior to being cast as The Tribe's Salene at age 14.

Her character was introduced as an emotional frightened child and early storylines dealt with her suffering from bulimia and alcoholism. By the fourth season however, Spence had emerged as one of the lead characters and, at one point, became leader of the Mall Rats. Her character would also become romantically involved with Ryan Runciman (Ryan) and Nick Miller (Pride). On 28 January 2001, she appeared in a stage performance with Tribe cast members Ari Boyland (KC), Jennyfer Jewell (Ellie), Michelle Ang (Tai-San), Caleb Ross (Lex), Vanessa Stacey (Alice) and Meryl Cassie (Ebony) in which they sang and performed for fans in New Zealand at the Te Papa Museum.

On 2 September 2004, Spence made her first appearance in North America with fellow Tribe co-stars Daniel James (Zoot) and Matt Robinson (Slade) at the 2004 Dragon*Con convention in Atlanta, Georgia. Featured guests at the event, the three appeared in series of panels during Labor Day weekend, judging a Tribe fan-based costume contest and attended an autograph signing. While at the convention, she gave an interview discussing her character's development on The Tribe.

In July 2008, Spence appeared in the Thomas Sainsbury's horror play Beast with David de Lautour and Todd Emerson (who co-starred with Victoria in Atlantis High). In 2009, Victoria tread the stage with Thomas Sainsbury again where she played the lead role in his production Little Blonde Hen. The play ran from 11 to 14 June 2009 and featured her co-stars from The Tribe, Beth Allen and Antonia Prebble.
