= Laura Wilson (actress) =

New Zealand actress (born 1983)

- Born: Laura Belle Wilson; 26 January 1983 (age 43); Wellington, New Zealand
- Occupations: Film and television actress
- Years active: 1999 - 2005
- Children: Jessica Liberty and Kendra Alice (b. 2008), Sophie Brook (b. 2010)

Laura Belle Wilson (born 26 January 1983) is a New Zealand born actress who appeared in many different projects for Cloud9 including Atlantis High and Revelations: The Initial Journey. She is best known for her four-year role as May in the popular cult series The Tribe.

== Biography ==
Wilson first made her film debut at age 10 when she appeared in the 1993 educational short film Choice. The film was produced by Little White Cloud Productions, a subdivision of Cloud9, which also starred later Tribe co-star Daniel James (Zoot). She was involved in theatre and drama during high school and played the lead role in A Comedy of Errors at the Sheilah Winn Shakespeare Festival. In 2000, she landed her first major role as May in the Cloud9 science fiction teen drama series The Tribe making a guest appearance during the second season and joined the cast as a regular character during the next four years until the shows cancellation in 2003. During her time on the show, she was one of several Tribe cast members who acted in another Cloud9 series portraying Jet Marigold in the teen comedy series Atlantis High along with Victoria Spence (Salene) and Michael Wesley-Smith (Jack). She became less active following the cancellation of The Tribe making a guest appearances in Revelations: The Initial Journey with Tom Hern (Ram) and the 2005 short film Cockle with Dwayne Cameron (Bray). Wilson also gave an exclusive interview on the season five DVD release of The Tribe.

In September 2006, Wilson appeared at DragonCon 2006 with former Tribe co-stars Caleb Ross (Lex), Matt Robinson (Slade) and Tom Hern. While there, she gave an interview discussing her time on the series as well as her character's development.
