= Zoë Robins =

New Zealand actress

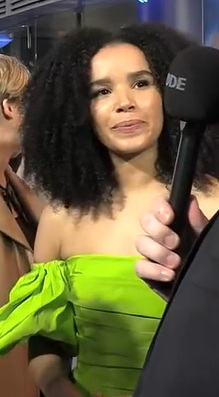
- Robins at The Wheel of Time London Premiere 2021
- Born: 1992 or 1993 (age 32–33); Wellington, New Zealand
- Occupation: Actress
- Years active: 2005–present
- Children: 1

Zoë Robins is a New Zealand actress, who played Hayley Foster in Power Rangers: Ninja Steel and Nynaeve al'Meara in The Wheel of Time.

== Career ==
Robins was born in 1993 and had her first acting role at age 12 in The New Tomorrow. She attended The Actor's Program, an acting course in Auckland. Her first major role was as the White Ranger in Power Rangers Ninja Steel. In August 2019 she was cast as Nynaeve al'Meara in Amazon's adaptation of The Wheel of Time. The series premiered in 2021.

== Personal life ==
Robins was born in Lower Hutt, Wellington, New Zealand. She is of partial Nigerian descent. She has a son.

== Filmography ==
=== Film ===
Year	Title	Role	Notes
2019	Black Christmas	Oona Apteao	

=== TV ===
Year	Title	Role	Notes
2005	The New Tomorrow	Faygar	
2006	The Killian Curse	Haley Bloomsfield	6 episodes
2016	Shortland Street	Sabina Faraj	1 episode
2016	The Shannara Chronicles	Zora	Episodes: Utopia, Breakline
2019	The Brokenwood Mysteries	Cleo	Episode: The Power of Steam
2017–2018	Power Rangers Ninja Steel	Hayley Foster (White Ninja Steel Ranger)	44 episodes
2021–2025	The Wheel of Time	Nynaeve al'Meara	Series regular; 24 episodes
