= Amelia Reynolds =

New Zealand actress

- Born: New Zealand
- Occupation: Actor

Amelia Reynolds is an actress from New Zealand.

== Career ==
Amelia Reynolds is best known for her role as Tally in The Tribe. She is also known for her roles in the children's television productions. Reynolds played Chloe, a sea ghost, in Paradise Café and played Lara in the Disney Channel's As The Bell Rings. She is a student at Victoria University of Wellington, and has performed in theatrical productions in the city, including Counting The Ways by Edward Albee.

== Filmography ==
=== Film ===
Year	Title	Role	Notes
2020	Baby Done	NICU Nurse	

=== Television ===
Year	Title	Role	Notes
1998	The Legend of William Tell	Tilly	Episode: "The Challenge"
2000–2001	The Tribe	Tally / Girl	36 episodes
2001	Dark Knight	Rena	Episode: "Stormguard"
2002	Revelations – The Initial Journey	Kate	Episode: "A Dream of Flying"
2009	As the Bell Rings	Lara	10 episodes
2009–2011	Paradise Café	Chloe	14 episodes
2015	When We Go to War	Annie	2 episodes
2016	The Making of the Mob	Mae Coughlin	8 episodes
2016	Hillary	Louise's friend	Episode: "Everest"
2018	Kiwi	Gillian Lupton	Television film
2020	The Wilds	Nurse	Episode: "Day Twelve"
2021	Sweet Tooth	Single Mom	Episode: "Out of the Deep Woods"
TBA	Triangle	Sarah	Episode: "Pilot"
