= Raymond Thompson =

British–Canadian–New Zealand television producer, screenwriter and composer

Raymond Webster Thompson MNZM (5 April 1949 - 15 January 2025) was a British-born Canadian-New Zealand screenwriter, composer and producer.

== Early life and career ==
Thompson was born in Redditch, Worcestershire and grew up in Windsor, Berkshire where he formed a school band with David Samuels, Keith Barnes and Ray Dorey who went on to become guitarist with Edison Lighthouse. He studied drama at York University and embarked upon a successful career in the music industry as both a songwriter and musician. His groups include a Canadian duo called Stillwater, and his school band The Avengers, which evolved into Edison Lighthouse, who had the number one record "Love Grows (Where My Rosemary Goes)".

== With the BBC ==
Thompson published a novel in 1979, The Number to Call Is... before becoming a script consultant for various producers. His television writing credits include Squadron and the iconic Howards' Way, which ran for six years and was considered to be one of the BBC's most loved drama series, drawing huge ratings. He acquired the position of Head of Development for BBC Television Drama Series and worked on many other titles, including Bergerac and The House of Eliott.

== Cloud 9 ==
In 1994 and in association with the Sanctuary Group PLC, Thompson founded his own production company, the Cloud 9 Screen Entertainment Group, which has since specialized in family entertainment. The company trades through offices in London, Wellington (New Zealand), and has expanded into the Australian market. Southern Star currently distribute the substantial back catalogue.

Since 1994, Thompson has created and produced several television series and movies, including The Enid Blyton Adventure Series, The Enid Blyton Secret Series, The Adventures of Swiss Family Robinson (starring Richard Thomas), Return to Treasure Island, The Legend of William Tell (created by Thompson), William Shatner's A Twist in the Tale (also created by Thompson). Other series Thompson created include Atlantis High, Revelations – The Initial Journey, and The New Tomorrow.

Perhaps his best known creation is the teen drama/sci-fi hybrid The Tribe, which has become a cult classic around the world and ran for five years with almost three hundred episodes being produced. The series is constantly being repeated and has a fanatical fan base.

In 2001, he returned to his music roots and composed the soundtracks of Cloud 9's portfolio, as well as the Spirit Symphony, which was partly inspired by his Asperger syndrome. It was performed by the New Zealand Symphony Orchestra and released on CD in 2004. The proceeds of the song "With You Every Step of the Way" (also composed by Raymond) were donated to the foundation.

== Honours ==
Thompson has been a juror at BAFTA and the International Emmy Awards. In the 2003 New Year Honours, he was appointed a Member of the New Zealand Order of Merit, for services to television and entertainment. In the same year he also received an honours award at Dragon*Con.

== Personal life ==
Thompson had Asperger syndrome, an autism spectrum condition. Thompson's son was also diagnosed. Thompson founded the Cloud 9's Children Foundation, which aims to support families in Oceania affected by Asperger syndrome.

A wine lover, Thompson owned Tirohana Estate, a boutique New Zealand vineyard on the outskirts of Martinborough, in the Wairarapa region.
