= The Tribe (1999 TV series) =

British science fiction TV series

- Genre: Teen drama; Science fiction; Post-apocalyptic fiction
- Created by: Raymond Thompson; Harry Duffin
- Theme music composer: Simon May; Simon Lockyer
- Opening theme: "The Dream Must Stay Alive"; Rosalind J (series 1); Meryl Cassie (series 2–5)
- Ending theme: "The Dream Must Stay Alive"; Rosalind J (series 1); "Abe Messiah"; Tribe cast (series 2–3); "Tribe Spirit"; Tribe Sister (series 4–5)
- Countries of origin: New Zealand; United Kingdom
- Original language: English
- No. of series: 5
- No. of episodes: 260 (list of episodes)

Production
- Executive producers: Raymond Thompson; Geoff Husson
- Producers: Declan Eames; Debra Kelleher-Smith
- Production location: Wellington Region, New Zealand
- Camera setup: Multi-camera
- Running time: 25 minutes
- Production company: Cloud 9 Screen Entertainment Group

Original release
- Network: Channel 5
- Release: 24 April 1999 – 6 September 2003

Related
- The New Tomorrow

The Tribe is a New Zealand-British science fiction drama television series which premiered on Channel 5 in the United Kingdom during its Core block on 24 April 1999. The series was created by Raymond Thompson and Harry Duffin, and was developed and produced by the Cloud 9 Screen Entertainment Group in New Zealand. The series was commissioned by Channel 5, who received the initial screening rights. The series made its New Zealand premiere in 1999 on TV4.

Primarily aimed at teenagers, The Tribe is set in a post-apocalyptic city in which all adults have been killed as the result of an unknown virus. The series focuses on the remaining children and teenagers who must navigate the social and personal issues of adolescence, while being faced with the larger problems of a society in a state of anarchy. The inhabitants of the city form social groups, or tribes, with the focus of the series on the Mall Rats, who fight to survive among other threatening tribes such as the Locos. Overarching themes include the focus on change from tradition, empowerment, religion, and the exploration of power and corruption. The series was filmed in Wellington, New Zealand.

The series ran for 260 episodes and aired its final episode on 6 September 2003. A sequel series entitled The New Tomorrow was commissioned by Channel 5 and the Seven Network in Australia and first aired in 2005. It depicted the descendants of characters from The Tribe and was aimed at a younger audience. The Tribe experienced a resurgence in popularity after screening on ABC3 in Australia in 2009. This led to Cloud 9 developing a series of novels to continue the story of the television series, the first of which was released in 2011.

== Plot ==
Series	Episodes	Originally released	
Series	Episodes	First released	Last released
1	52	24 April 1999	23 October 1999
2	52	14 November 1999	6 May 2000
3	52	18 November 2000	11 May 2001
4	52	5 January 2002	6 July 2002
5	52	15 March 2003	6 September 2003

=== Season 1 ===
In a post-apocalyptic city, all of the adults have been killed as a result of an unknown virus, leaving the children and teenagers to survive in a state of anarchy. Several social groups, or tribes, have formed, including the "Locos", an unruly tribe controlling the city under the leadership of Zoot, who is later accidentally killed. On the streets, Amber and Dal lead a group of children to safety and take refuge in an abandoned shopping mall, forming a new tribe called the "Mall Rats". They are joined by Bray and Trudy, who is pregnant; Bray's brother, Zoot, is the father. The tribe learns to solve issues including food and water shortage. A second wave of the virus strikes the city, and the tribe tries searching to find an Antidote. They travel to a base called Eagle Mountain, where a pre-recorded message confirms the Antidote's existence.

=== Season 2 ===
At Eagle Mountain, Amber and Zandra, who is pregnant, are killed in an explosion. The tribe continues searching for an antidote to the virus and are successful, with Tai-San becoming the only one aware of the formula to produce it. Under Bray's leadership, the Mall Rats use their position of power to unite the other tribes and bring peace to the city. A bill of rights is developed by Danni, along with a trading market in the mall, and a newsletter by Ellie detailing the city's progress. The virus is later diminished, and a new tribe called the "Chosen" surfaces, they are remnants of the Locos who now worship Zoot as their god.

=== Season 3 ===
The Chosen take control of the city, led by the Guardian and the "Supreme Mother", who is a brainwashed Trudy. The Mall Rats are captured and, along with other prisoners of the city, are given the choice to join the Chosen or work as slaves, with many civilians being sent away due to rebellion. After escaping, Bray, Ebony, Lex and Dal encounter the Eco tribe and discover that its leader is Amber, whose death had been faked by Ebony. The Eco tribe join the revolt and the remaining Mall Rats recruit other tribes to their side. The Chosen are overthrown, and Ebony is elected as city leader though manipulation; she banishes Bray and Amber for speaking against her as a mysterious plane invades the city.

=== Season 4 ===
The city is invaded and conquered by a group of paratroopers, who are called the "Technos" and possess advanced technology. Ebony maintains control of the city through a deal with the Technos general, Jay. After Bray is captured, Trudy helps Amber give birth on the outskirts of town. They flee to the Ecos, then later rejoin the Mall Rats. In an attempt to create a utopia, the leader of the Technos, Ram, releases a virtual reality game to which the people of the city become addicted in exchange for workload. Ebony and Jay betray Ram and escape the city. The Mall Rats defeat Ram with the assistance of Ram's lieutenant, Mega.

=== Season 5 ===
Mega becomes the new leader of the Technos, and plans to take over the city. He orders everyone to be branded with a barcode and set to manual labour. Ebony is manipulated by virtual reality to believe that Zoot is alive. The Mall Rats try to learn the location of their members who were removed by the Technos. Ram is rescued by a vagabond, Slade, who takes him to the country town Liberty. Amber and Jay lead an attack against the city, capturing Mega. Ram infiltrates Mega's technology and creates an artificial intelligence program, which goes rogue and releases a new virus. The Mall Rats and their allies evacuate the city by boat.

== Characters ==
Character	Actor	Series				
Character	Actor	1	2	3	4	5
Bray	Dwayne Cameron	Main	Main	Main		
Amber (Note: Credited as "Eagle / Amber" or "Amber / Eagle" in all series 3 appearances.)	Beth Allen	Main		Main (Note: Beth Allen is again credited as main cast starting with the fifth episode of series 3.)	Main	Main
Lex	Caleb Ross	Main	Main	Main	Main	Main
Zandra	Amy Morrison	Main				
Ryan	Ryan Runciman	Main (Note: Ryan Runciman is last credited as main cast in the twenty-fourth episode of series 3.)	Main	Main		
Dal	Ashwath Sundarasen	Main	Main	Recurring (Note: Ashwath Sundarasen is only credited for the first twelve episodes of series 3.)		
Salene	Victoria Spence	Main (Note: Victoria Spence is not credited for the last eight episodes of series 3.)	Main	Main	Main	Main
Jack	Michael Wesley-Smith	Main	Main	Recurring (Note: Michael Wesley-Smith is only credited for ten episodes throughout series 3, and is only credited for the first seven episodes of series 4.)	Recurring	Main
Paul	Zachary Best	Main (Note: Zachary Best is credited as main cast through the first twenty episodes of series 1.)				
Patsy	Sarah Major	Main	Main	Recurring (Note: Sarah Major is only credited for the first eighteen episodes of series 3.)		
Cloe	Jaimee Kaire-Gataulu	Main	Main	Recurring (Note: Jaimee Kaire-Gataulu is only credited for the first twelve episodes of series 3.)	Main (Note: Jaimee Kaire-Gataulu is last credited as main cast in the thirty-fifth episode of series 4.)	
Trudy	Antonia Prebble	Main	Main	Main	Main	Main
Zoot	Daniel James (Note: Credited as "Danny James", starting with series 3.)	Main (Note: Daniel James is only credited as main cast through the first eight episodes of series 1.)	Guest	Guest	Guest	Recurring
Tai-San	Michelle Ang	Main (Note: Michelle Ang is first credited as main cast in the fifteenth episode of series 1.)	Main	Main	Guest	
KC	Ari Boyland	Main (Note: Ari Boyland is first credited as main cast in the twenty-second episode of series 1.)	Main	Main		Guest
Ebony	Meryl Cassie	Recurring	Main	Main	Main	Main
Danni	Ella Wilks		Main			
Ellie	Jennyfer Jewell		Main	Main	Recurring (Note: Jennyfer Jewell is only credited for the first thirteen episodes of series 4.)	Main
Alice	Vanessa Stacey	Guest	Main	Main		Guest
May	Laura Wilson		Recurring	Main	Recurring (Note: Laura Wilson is only credited for the last eighteen episodes of series 4.)	Main
Pride	Nick Miller			Main	Main	Recurring (Note: Nick Miller is credited for the first four, and the seventh and eighth, episodes of series 5.)
The Guardian	Damon Andrews		Recurring	Main		Guest
Lt Luke	Jacob Tomuri			Main		
Ned	Bevin Linkhorn			Main (Note: First credited as main cast in the eighteenth episode of series 3.) (Note: Bevin Linkhorn is last credited as main cast in the forty-eighth episode of series 3.)		
Tally	Amelia Reynolds			Main		
Andy	James Ordish			Main		
Dee	Kelly Stevenson				Main	
Ram	Tom Hern				Main	Main
Jay	James Napier				Main	Main
Ved	Dan Weekes-Hannah				Main (Note: Dan Weekes-Hannah is last credited as main cast in the forty-sixth episode of series 4.)	
Java	Megan Alatini				Main (Note: Last credited as main cast in the forty-second episode of series 5.)	Main
Siva	Monique Cassie				Main	Main
Mouse	Jacinta Wawatai				Main (Note: Jacinta Wawatai is last credited as main cast in the twenty-sixth episode of series 5.)	Main
Sammy	Lucas Hayward				Main (Note: Lucas Hayward is first credited as main cast in the nineteenth episode of series 4.)	Main
Patch	Morgan Palmer Hubbard				Main (Note: Morgan Palmer Hubbard is first credited as main cast in the twenty-eighth episode of series 4.)	
Mega	Calen Maiava-Paris				Recurring (Note: After appearing as a guest star in the forty-first episode, Calen Maiava-Paris is first credited as regular cast in the forty-sixth episode of series 4.)	Main
Slade	Matt Robinson					Main
Ruby	Fleur Saville					Main
Gel	Vicky Rodewyk					Main (Note: Vicky Rodewyk is first credited as main cast in the third episode of series 5.)
Zoot's double / Darryl	Joseph Crawford					Main (Note: Joseph Crawford is first credited as main cast in the eighth episode of series 5.)
Lottie (Note: Credited as "Urchin" in the eighth episode of series 5.)	Beth Chote					Main (Note: Beth Chote is first credited as main cast, as Lottie, in the thirty-third episode of series 5.)
Top Hat	Sam Husson	Recurring	Guest			

== Production ==
=== Development ===
"Our aim was to accurately reflect the world that viewers inhabit in a fictional environment through which we could explore everyday issues and experiences."

— Raymond Thompson, 2003

Discussion which led to the creation of the series began when Raymond Thompson, co-founder of the independent production company Cloud 9 Screen Entertainment Group, known for his work as a screenwriter on the soap Howards' Way, was approached by Nick Wilson of Channel 5 to "develop a soap for the millennium, targeting a child/adolescent market". Thompson recalled an idea that he had in the 1980s about a world without adults, run by tribes of children and teenagers. Having already worked with writer Harry Duffin on several occasions, Thompson contacted him in November 1997 to work with him on further developing the concept for Cloud 9. They commissioned and recruited a team of ten writers to adapt the storylines and by July 1998 the first four scripts of The Tribe were finished.

Pre-production for series one started in June 1998 and filming began in August 1998. Principal photography was completed in March 1999 and the first episode premiered on Channel 5 on 24 April 1999. By June 2001, it was the broadcaster's "leading children's programme".

The show's official website played a role in further development of The Tribe. Viewers used the website to discuss the show in a forum. Thompson revealed that he used viewer response for audience research which helped develop additional stories.

=== Filming ===
The cast and crew amounted to between 400 and 500 people on each season of The Tribe. Filming of each season took about four to six months, chiefly in two studios at Cloud 9's production centre in Wellington, New Zealand. The permanent set of the "Phoenix Shopping Mall" was located in Studio A. This large set took five weeks to build prior to the commencement of principal photography and was said to be the largest set built for a production in New Zealand at the time. All of the shops contained in the Mall were built to almost realistic shop size specifications and designed to last for a long time.

The set of the "Phoenix Shopping Mall" in series one.

Studio B housed the sewers that the Mall Rats use to secretly escape the Mall, as well as temporary structures that were built for scenes outside the Mall. Between the filming of the second and third series of The Tribe, the Mall set was repainted and redressed for use on another Cloud 9 production, Atlantis High.

Scenes of The Tribe were also shot on location in and around Wellington. For example, the Cloud 9 Studios car park was used as the exterior of the Mall and Alice's and Ellie's farmhouse was built in the rural area of Whitemans Valley in Upper Hutt. At times, over some weekends, the crew closed off Wellington streets to shoot scenes that took place in the desolate city streets.

=== Casting ===
Most of the cast had agents prior to the casting in 1998, as they had already worked on productions that were filmed in New Zealand, such as Xena: Warrior Princess, Hercules: The Legendary Journeys or Mirror, Mirror II.

Many of the actors had worked with Thompson on other Cloud 9 productions before they auditioned for The Tribe. Jennyfer Jewell (Ellie) and Ryan Runciman (Ryan) had worked on The Enid Blyton Adventure Series in 1996 and Jewell had also starred in The Enid Blyton Secret Series in 1997 alongside Daniel James (Zoot). Beth Allen (Amber) and Michael Wesley-Smith (Jack) had been cast in The Legend of William Tell in 1998. Many cast members from series one had acted in William Shatner's A Twist in the Tale in 1999.

The majority of the actors cast in series one were students and were tutored between scenes at Cloud 9's production centre. The underage cast members stayed in the "Cast House" for the duration of the shoot and were accompanied by chaperones on set.

=== Cancellation ===
Pre-production for series six started in September 2003 and a script for a Tribe movie was written and put on the market. The scripts for the first two episodes of series six were included on the Series 5 DVD box set (released in 2006), and told the story of the Mall Rats as they arrived on an unknown island.

However, Nick Wilson and Thompson decided that although "the show was still performing well, [they] felt that the cast was getting too old [and that] it was beginning to stretch the core proposition." Some of the cast and crew members went on to work on other productions.

== Release ==
=== Broadcast ===
Series one of The Tribe premiered in the United Kingdom on 24 April 1999 on Five (Channel 5). It was broadcast on Channel 5 every Saturday. The final two episodes of The Tribe were shown on 6 September 2003 on Five.

The Tribe began airing in New Zealand on TV4 on 21 August 1999.

In the United States, The Tribe premiered on 1 December 1999 on Encore WAM! Channel. and MoviePlex. WAM! remained the program's exclusive US broadcaster throughout its run.

In Australia, The Tribe returned to television through its broadcast on ABC3 in 2010. The third series was aired due to popular audience demand and the program was repeated until 2012.

=== Home media and streaming services ===
Series one was first released in 2003 by Sanctuary Entertainment. Two years later, Revelation Films purchased the rights to the show and released all five series throughout 2006.

The first series of The Tribe was released on DVD in Australia by the ABC on 3 March 2011 after airing on ABC3. Dwayne Cameron appeared at promotional release events.

In 2012, Shout! Factory released the first series of The Tribe in the US through two volumes. Questar Entertainment released the first volume in a region-free format in 2018.

All five seasons of the program were released to Vimeo in 2018. They were also made available on the New Zealand video-on-demand service Lightbox.

== Sequels ==
=== The New Tomorrow ===
During pre-production for the planned series six of The Tribe, Channel 5 and Cloud 9 created a sequel television series, The New Tomorrow. Twenty-six episodes were produced, which aired in 2005 on the Seven Network in Australia and on Five in the United Kingdom. The series was also filmed in Wellington, with twenty core cast and up to a hundred crew members, including a large number who had worked on Peter Jackson's's King Kong. Many themes and storylines intended for The Tribe's series six were used and adapted for the new series. The New Tomorrow was aimed at a younger audience, 8- to 12-year-olds, but followed the same theme of children creating a new world without the adults. It was set further in the future and followed the story of four Tribes: the Ants, the Barbs, the Privileged and the Discards.

=== Unproduced movie ===
Before the series was cancelled, Raymond Thompson had been working on a screenplay for a Tribe movie in 2003. He mentioned that the film was "a backstory. The lead up to the virus. And how cities of children came about... but lots more as well." It was also mentioned to be in the third draft before it was shelved due to the show's cancellation. In 2011, The Tribe movie, named Tribes, was announced to be in development with the partnership of Legendary Pictures. Raymond Thompson revealed he had been working with Rob Cohen and Jason Rothenberg; the latter went on to produce The 100. In 2015, the project fell through due to creative differences. Since 2015, Thompson has been trying to produce a sequel and a motion picture, but is unable to say more details due to non-disclosure agreements.

=== Sequel novels ===
Three novels have been published that continue the television series' narrative:

- A. J. Penn (25 November 2011). The Tribe: A New World. Auckland, New Zealand: Cumulus Publishing Ltd. ISBN 978-0-473-19938-8.
- A. J. Penn (30 November 2014). The Tribe: A New Dawn. Auckland, New Zealand: Cumulus Publishing Ltd. ISBN 978-0-473-30794-3.
- A. J. Penn (5 November 2019). The Tribe: R(Evolution). Auckland, New Zealand: Cumulus Publishing Ltd. ISBN 978-0-473-50125-9.

== Other media ==
=== Novels ===
In addition to the sequel novels discussed above have been these books based on the series have been published in English:

- Paula Boock (17 September 2000). Power and Chaos. Auckland, New Zealand: Random House. ISBN 1-86941-435-7.
- Ken Catran (2001). Mall Rats. Auckland, New Zealand: Random House. ISBN 1-86941-471-3.
- Harry Duffin (25 November 2012). The Tribe: Birth of the Mall Rats. Martinborough, New Zealand: Cumulus Publishing Ltd. ISBN 978-0473231491.

Several books related to The Tribe have also been published in German.

- Ralph Sander (January 2002). The Tribe: Zwischen Hoffen und Bangen (in German). Panini Verlags GmbH. ISBN 978-3897485983.
- Ralph Sander (February 2002). The Tribe: Schöne Neue Welt (in German). Panini Verlags GmbH. ISBN 978-3897485976.
- Ralph Sander; Linda Jansen (September 2002). The Tribe: Das Zeitalter der Auserwählten (in German). Panini Verlags GmbH. ISBN 978-3897486676.
- Ralph Sander; Linda Jansen (November 2002). The Tribe: Der Weg in die Freiheit (in German). Panini Verlags GmbH. ISBN 978-3897486676.
- Ralph Sander; Linda Jansen (March 2003). The Tribe: Die Ankunft der Technos (in German). Panini Verlags GmbH. ISBN 978-3897487284.
- Ralph Sander; Linda Jansen (March 2003). The Tribe: Verloren im Paradies (in German). Panini Verlags GmbH. ISBN 978-3897487291.

=== Music ===
Two CDs were released, featuring music from the soundtrack of the television series and songs recorded by the cast. Abe Messiah was released on 7 November 2000 in New Zealand and on 19 March 2001 worldwide. A reissued version of the album, entitled Abe Messiah: Remix, was released in Germany in 2003. It also featured three music videos: "Abe Messiah", "You Belong to Me" and "This Is the Place". The Tribe released their music via a deal with UK label Sanctuary Records.
