= Damon Andrews =

New Zealand director and actor

- Born: 28 October 1971 (age 54); New Zealand
- Years active: 1992 - present

Damon Andrews (born 28 October 1971) is a director and actor from New Zealand.

== Career ==
Andrews graduated from Toi Whakaari: New Zealand Drama School in 1992 with a Diploma in Acting.

He is mostly known for his role in The Tribe as Jaffa - more commonly known as The Guardian. He was a core character that first appeared as the leader of the Zoot crazed cult called The Chosen. He remained a cast member in series 2 and 3, before departing from the cast, but made special returning scenes along with past cast member Vanessa Stacey and Ari Boyland.

Andrews also appeared in Urban Gothic and Traffic Island, and in a production of Revelations – The Initial Journey.
