= Ryan Runciman =

New Zealand voice and television actor

- Born: 22 November 1982 (age 43); Upper Hutt, New Zealand
- Occupations: Voice and television actor, accountant
- Years active: 1996–2002
- Partner: Fay Greenhalgh

Ryan Runciman (born 22 November 1982) is a New Zealand voice and television actor. Although best known for his role in the long-running teen drama science fiction series The Tribe, he has appeared on other children's television series including The Enid Blyton Adventure Series, Mirror, Mirror II and William Shatner's A Twist in the Tale. Runciman has also guest starred on the fantasy-adventure series Dark Knight and Revelations.

== Biography ==
The youngest of four children, Runciman was born in Upper Hutt, New Zealand. He began appearing in commercials at the age of 5 and eventually became involved in film and television work while attending St. Patrick's College. A trained singer and tap dancer, he also performed voice over and still photographic work. In 1996, he received his television acting debut appearing in a minor role on the television adaptation of The Ship of Adventure as part of The Enid Blyton Adventure Series and Mirror, Mirror II a year later. He also landed the starring role in The Duellists, the fifth episode of William Shatner's A Twist in the Tale, with fellow Tribe co-star Victoria Spence.

In early-1999, Runciman was cast as a supporting character in the teen drama science-fiction series The Tribe. Initially introduced as the right-hand man of Lex, an early antagonist of the series played by Caleb Ross, his portrayal of Ryan as a trusting and good natured, yet naive socially awkward adolescent, proved a popular character in the series. His character eventually became more prominently featured in the show's second and third seasons, most notably, his relationship with Victoria Spence's character Salene. He remained in the series until early-2001 when he decided to continue his education at Victoria University of Wellington as well as other commitments. Michelle Ang, another Tribe cast member, also chose to study at the university during this time.

Following the series cancellation, Runciman had guest appearances in Dark Knight and, along with another Tribe co-star Jacinta Wawatai, in Revelations during 2002. In November 2004, he completed a training program to become a certified public accountant. After returning from a three-month tour of nine countries, he started work in a KPMG firm early the next year.
