= Revelations – The Initial Journey =

New Zealand TV series

- Genre: Teen drama Family; Fantasy
- Created by: Raymond Thompson
- Written by: Harry Duffin; Nick McCarty; David E. Robertson; Mervyn Haisman; Tony Osborn; David Fox; Joe Boyle; Marie MacNeill; Anthony Read
- Directed by: Janet Stubbings; David Reid; Julian McSwiney; Costa Botes; Murray Keane; Geoff Husson; John Reid
- Starring: Tom Hern
- Theme music composer: Raymond Thompson; Adam Thompson
- Opening theme: "Spirit"; New Zealand Symphony Orchestra
- Ending theme: "Spirit"; New Zealand Symphony Orchestra
- Composers: Raymond Thompson; Adam Thompson
- Countries of origin: New Zealand (Production); United Kingdom (Commissioning)
- Original language: English
- No. of seasons: 1
- No. of episodes: 26

Production
- Executive producer: Raymond Thompson
- Production locations: Wellington, New Zealand
- Cinematography: Sean O'Donnell; David Paul
- Editors: Wayne Cook; Andy Mortimer; Ben Sinclair
- Camera setup: Multi-camera
- Running time: 25 minutes
- Production company: Cloud 9 Screen Entertainment Group

Original release
- Network: Channel 5
- Release: 6 October 2002 – 30 March 2003

Revelations – The Initial Journey is a 2002 TV series, produced by the Cloud 9 Screen Entertainment Group in New Zealand, and distributed by its programming arm, Cumulus Distribution. The stories are told through the narrator who is called Jess and played by Tom Hern. Each episode contains a story from a different time and place in world history. The show ran for one season and it had 26 half-hour episodes.

== Cast and characters ==
Characters who did not get any lines are not included.

- Tom Hern as Jess
- Ben Barrington as Mathius / Prison Guard No. 1
- Paul Rawson as Joe Hirst
- Danielle Mason as Sarah / Pretty Girl
- Kelson Henderson as Tugen
- Daniel Costello as Sean
- Todd Rippon as Hugo Brant
- Marama Jackson as Mary Welbourne
- Gerald Bryan as Walter Looms
- Beth Allen as Anna Chase
- Stephen Gledhill as Martin Chase
- Michelle Amas as Janet Chase
- Lee Donoghue as Mike
- Paul McLaughlin as Bill
- Amelia Reynolds as Kate
- Di O'Connell as Television Reporter
- Stephen Bain as Anna's Doctor
- Marc Appleby as Derek
- Miriama McDowell as Dorcas Miller
- Danielle Mason as Sarah Kent
- Josephine Davison as Anne Miller
- Stephen Lovatt as George Kent
- Geoffrey Heath as Reverend William Judd
- Guylaine Michel as Hepsibah
- Steven Ray as Witch Finder
- Betty Adams as Woman #1
- Mark Ruka as Tuku
- Vicky Rodewyk as Vaani
- Peter Vere-Jones as John Buchanan
- Lani Tupu Snr. as Chief Finau
- Johnny Bond as Captain
- David Telford as Cleaver Jackson
- Charlotte Woollams as Perdita Jackson
- Damon Andrews as Harvey
- Lewis Rowe as Cleaver's Doctor
- Errol Wright as Peter
- John Smythe as Headman
- Nick Brown as Barman
- Aaron James Murphy as Billy
- Arty Papageorgiou as Bully Boy
- Hannah Armstrong as Girl 1
- Hannah Holland as Girl 2
- Alison Boyd as Ma
- Molly Macdonald as Molly
- Geoffrey Snell as Pa
- Don Langridge as Sheriff
- Mathew Hegan as Teacher
- Brian Sergent as Lysias
- Irene Wood as Judith
- Chantelle Brader as Sarah
- Emily Shute as Hannah
- Toby Leach as Matthias
- Richard Knowles as Roman Officer
- Inia Maxwell as Man No. 1
- Stephen Butterworth as Jesus
- Miriama Smith as Anaka
- Maiava Eteuati Ete as Two Tiger
- Sarah Johnston as Kalu
- George Henare as Bazal
- Jesse Jardine as Warrior #1
- Grant Roa as Warrior #2
- Rachel House as Ocelot
- Zion Trigger as Poc a Toc
- Kat Angus as Julia
- Belinda Bretton as Ivy
- Maria Penney as Donna
- Daniel James as Danny
- David Taylor as Carl
- Carmel McGlone as Mrs. Wesley
- Dennis Proctor as Coach Ericsson
- Jon Brazier as Ford
- Grant Bridger as Dyer
- Jed Brophy as Pieter
- Morgan Palmer-Hubbard as Aran Woods
- Rachel Batty as Ruth Woods
- Will Harris as Ben Woods
- Matt Chamberlain as Father
- Matt Spicer as Bandit No. 1
- Pua Magasiva as Greg Davies
- Morgan Fairhead as Kim
- Jacinta Wawatai as Sandy Davies
- Jade Williams as Helen
- Ryan Runciman as Carl
- Perry Piercy as Mrs. Davies
- Dave Fane as Mr. Davies
- Charles Lum as Lao Fong
- Keith Chau as Kai
- Sally Martin as Annie
- Keegan Fulford-Wierzbicki as Tully
- Lyndon Keenan as Biffo
- Ari Boyland as Pig
- Desmond Kelly as Solomon
- Jocelyn Christian as Pasha
- Karras Van Der Made as Helena
- Jim Moriarty as Amal
- Taika Cohen as Ali
- David McKenzie as Saul
- Daniel Northcott as David
- Mia Koning as Myrtle
- Eve Carvell as Maude
- Dai Henwood as Carlos
- Colin Moy as Phil
- Jacob Tomuri as Jacob
- Simon Gibbes as Jonty
- Vanessa Werner as Maureen
- Alistair Browning as Patrick
- Tina Regtien as Cathleen
- Cameron Rhodes as Jimmy Galbraith
- Peter Corrigan as Mick
- Renee Ellwood as Annie Collins
- Meryl Cassie as Lucy James
- Tim Dale as Wayne
- Jason Gascoigne as Billy
- Julia Shardlow as Peggy-Sue
- Amy Todd as Tammy
- Monty Asare as Old Joe
- Richard Lambeth as Henry
- Wanjiku Sanderson as Mamie
- John Wraight as Mr. Collins
- Michael Wilson as Mr. Irving
- Tom McLeod as Tommy Love
- Chelsie Preston Crayford as April
- Joanne Mildenhall as Darlene
- Edward Campbell as Herb
- Carolyn McLaughlin as Tracy
- Lucy Wigmore as Presenter
- Marie-Louise Williams as Reporter No. 1
- Amy Tarleton as Reporter No. 2
- Sam Masina as Reporter No. 3
- Larry Rew as Aviner
- Charlie Bleakley as Daniil
- Hannah Costello as Elkie
- Shane Bartle as Ruel
- Duncan Sarkies as Kalev
- Ralph Johnson as Prefect
- Stig Eldred as Morgan
- Winston Harris as Arun
- Jane Waddell as Arun's Aunt
- Andrew Kovacevich as Morgan's Heckler
- Joseph Mika-Hunt as Town Folk Leader
- Janine Burchett as Isabelle
- Salesi Le'ota as Phillipe
- Nicholas Hopkins as Albert
- Aidan Grealish as Alain
- Joe Ballard as Jean
- K.C. Kelly as Pierre
- Chris Ryan as Young Man
- Caleb Ross as Samuel
- Julian Wilson as Josiah
- Barret Irwin as Caleb
- Alicia Fulford-Wierzbicki as Ruth
- James McCaskill as Heckler & Thief
- Celia Nicholson as Samuel's Mother
- Lucas Hayward as Aaron
- Emma Deakin as Woman No. 1
- Lewis Martin as Judge
- Stuart Devenie as Brandon
- Laura Wilson as Hannah
- Drew Neemia as Jack
- Anne Budd as Kate
- Richard Edge as Thomas
- Sally Spencer-Harris as Gertrude
- John Sumner as Walter Goldburn
- Dra McKay as Maisy
