= Jacob Tomuri =

New Zealand actor and stuntman

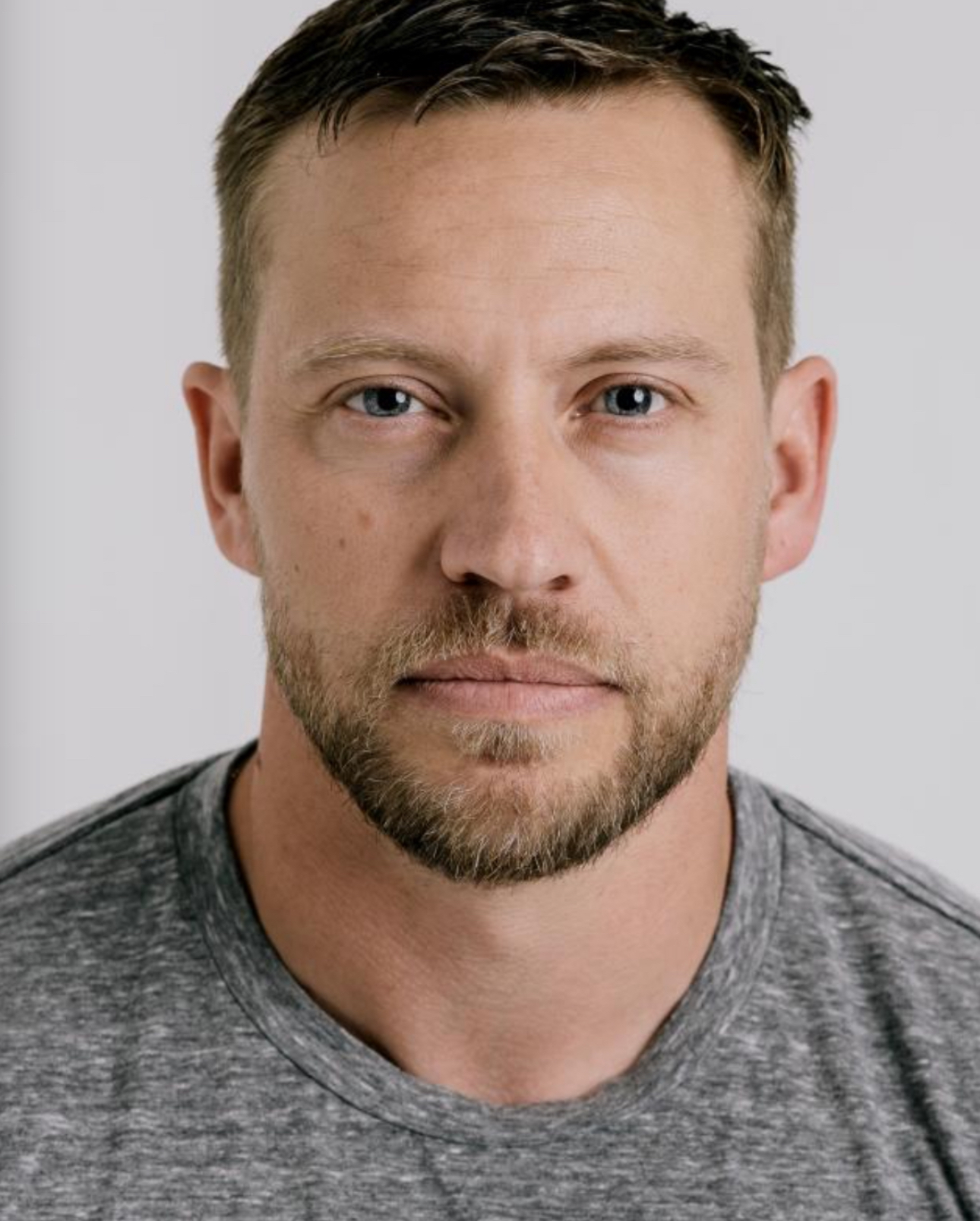
- Tomuri in 2018
- Born: Jacob Adam Tomuri; 4 December 1979 (age 46); New Zealand
- Occupations: Actor, stuntman
- Years active: 1999–present

Jacob Tomuri (born 4 December 1979) is a New Zealand actor and stuntman. In 2000–2001, he appeared in over 50 twice-weekly episodes of the UK/NZ teen sci-fi series The Tribe as Lt. Luke. In 2001, he did stunt work for all three of The Lord of the Rings film trilogy.

Tomuri has had guest roles in the long running TV New Zealand soap Shortland Street (2004–2005), Revelations – The Initial Journey (2003), and the syndicated-by-ABC series Legend of the Seeker (2008) for which he has also done regular stunt work. He has had minor roles in the 2001 New Zealand film Snakeskin, as pirate Bill Jukes in Peter Pan (2003), and Columbia Pictures horror film 30 Days of Night, and a central role in the short Ergotism. He had a bit part in the blockbuster Avatar, for which he also did stunts. His stunt work includes TV series Spartacus: Blood and Sand (2010). In 2013, he began work as a stunt double for Tom Hardy, in films including Mad Max: Fury Road, Legend, The Revenant, and Venom. In the 2024 film Furiosa: A Mad Max Saga, Tomuri replaced Hardy for a cameo appearance as Max Rockatansky.

== Personal life ==
Jacob Tomuri has four siblings. He failed drama in high school, though he loved it and could not think of doing anything but acting. After completing his secondary school education, Jacob started working and learning at The New Zealand College of Performing Arts in Porirua. When he graduated, he got a job on The Lord of the Rings as a stuntman. First only a contract for four weeks, it became a year-and-a-half contract. Tomuri was the youngest member of the 20-strong stunt team. While working as a stuntman, he also had a role as Lieutenant Luke in the third series of The Tribe and a small role in the film Snakeskin. In 2004, he got the award as CLEO Celebrity Bachelor of the Year 2004.

He is engaged and a father of two sons.

== Filmography ==
=== Film ===
Year	Title	Role	Notes
2001	Snakeskin	Robbie	
2003	Peter Pan	Bill Jukes	
2007	30 Days of Night	Seth	
2008	Ergotism	Mat	Short film
2009	Avatar	Dragon Gunship Navigator	
2014	The Hobbit: The Battle of the Five Armies	Somber Villager	Uncredited
2014	Sunday	Stephan	
2017	Do No Harm	One	Short film
2024	Furiosa: A Mad Max Saga	Max Rockatansky	Cameo appearance
2024	Venom: The Last Dance	Tuxedo Guy	

=== Television ===
Year	Title	Role	Notes
2000–2001	The Tribe	Luke	57 episodes
2003	Revelations – The Initial Journey	Jacob	Episode: "A Mess of Pottage"
2003, 2005	Shortland Street	Norman Hanson	2 episodes
2009	Legend of the Seeker	Lieutenant Bram	Episode: "Conversion"
2010	Spartacus	Rebel (uncredited)	Episode: "Kill Them All"
2014	Step Dave	Nathan	2 episodes
2018	Wrecked	Mumbles	Episode: "Bush Man"
