= The New Tomorrow =

- Opening credits
- Genre: Children's drama; Science fiction
- Created by: Raymond Thompson; Harry Duffin
- Developed by: Cloud 9; Five; Seven Network
- Theme music composer: Raymond Thompson
- Opening theme: "Tribe Spirit" by Tribe Sister
- Country of origin: New Zealand
- Original language: English
- No. of series: 1
- No. of episodes: 26

Production
- Executive producers: Raymond Thompson; Geoff Husson
- Producer: Janet Stubbings
- Production location: New Zealand
- Camera setup: Multi-camera
- Running time: 25 minutes

Original release
- Network: Seven Network
- Release: 17 September – 9 December 2005

Related
- The Tribe

The New Tomorrow is a New Zealand–based television series produced by Cloud 9 Screen Entertainment Group in association with Channel 5 and is a sequel to the series The Tribe. The show was created by Raymond Thompson and premiered on 17 September 2005 on the Seven Network in Australia.

The events of The New Tomorrow follow the final episode of series five of The Tribe. It is unclear how much time has passed since The Tribe ended or what connections exist between the two shows.

== Premise ==
Following the outbreak of a virus, the entire adult population has been wiped out leaving their children to survive alone. Most of the children have formed tribes, each with their own distinct makeup and clothes. Each of these tribes follow different philosophies which invariably lead to conflict.

While The Tribe focused mainly on the children surviving in the city, The New Tomorrow focuses on those in the countryside and the forest, and in particular on three tribes, The Ants, The Barbs and The Privileged.

== Characters ==
=== Main ===
- Sky (played by Nick Fenton) – He is a mysterious outsider, who first comes across The Ants, and then grows close to The Barbs and Zora, though he refuses to join any tribe. Sky's origins are a mystery, even to him.
- Dan (played by Rafe Custance), of The Ants – Initially a member of The Ants but he resists their beliefs such as their worship of the Mall Rats. He likes the way of life The Barbs have and is eventually allowed to join them after having to go through an initiation ceremony.
- Omar (played by Trey Brown), of The Ants – He is very protective of The Ants, and is distrustful of outsiders. He also dislikes Dan.
- Flame (played by Cameron Wakefield), of The Privileged – He is the leader of The Privileged and a bully. Flame really doesn't go much on Harmony or Shadow but can't say anything, because they are the closest thing to a family member or friend that he has.
- Zora (placed by Felicity Milovanovich), of The Barbs – She is the leader of The Barbs. She feels there is something familiar about Sky by asking him if he is "...sure he hasn't been in these parts before?"
- Jag (played by Joshua Rippon), of The Barbs – He doesn't like outsiders and feels that the protection of other The Barbs is important above all other things. (episodes 1–16)
- Harmony (played by Lara Custance), of The Privileged – She is the chief adviser to Flame, though she secretly harbours reservations about Flame's leadership.
- Faygar (played by Zoë Robins), of The Ants – She is the leader of The Ants, and the chief priestess in the Ants' "ancestor" religion.
- Kwarli (played by Thomas Steventon), of [The Barbs – He likes to help all people and do what he feels is best for all, not just what is best for his tribe.
- Cass (played by Paige Shand-Haami), of The Ants – She is the cook for The Ants' tribe. Cass is a caring girl who likes to help and comfort others.
- Shadow (played by James Shaw), of The Warps – He is the leader of The Warps, The Privileged's army, and bodyguard to Flame. He is a great fighter and has a battle scar over his left eye. He keeps a pet rat in his room at "The Priv" headquarters. He is later "discarded" during Harmony's coup, but soon escapes. (episodes 1–24)
- Gwyn (played by Henrietta Steventon), formerly of The Discards and then chosen to be of The Privileged – Once a Discard, Gwyn is picked to become a "Priv", though she hasn't forgotten what it is like to be Discard and treats her Discard servants with respect, unlike the other Privileged. She is later picked by the Privs to be their spy on The Barbs and The Ants, with the conditions being – if Gwyn is successful and gets useful information on the two tribes, and on the mysterious Sky, then she will remain a "Priv"; otherwise she will be thrown in The Forbidden Zone. It is on this mission that Gwyn discovers her long lost brother, Dan, who by then is a member of The Barbs.
- Erin (played by Arthur Caughley), of The Barbs – He is the younger brother of Leanne. He is often lazy, and is a mischievous troublemaker.
- Leanne (played by Katie Alexander), of The Barbs – She is the older sister of Erin, and is often annoyed by his antics.
- Sal (played by Abbey-May Wakefield), of The Ants – She is only 6 years old. She has a pet pig named Star, and is very protective of the tribe's animals.

=== Recurring and guest ===
- Magdar (played by Imogen Cassin), of The Discards – She is a Discard who serves Gwyn, upon the latter's joining the Privileged. Gwyn mothers and befriends the girl, but when Gwyn's position in The Privs is threatened by Harmony, Gwyn frames Magdar for theft and has her sent to the Forbidden Zone. (episodes 4–6)
- Crusher (played by Marc Shaw), of The Warps – He is originally chosen by Shadow to spy on the Ants and the Barbs for the Privs, but he is rejected for the mission by Flame. (episode 9)
- The Stranger (played by Jimmy Kwan), of The Birds – He is the youngest brother of Sunni and Lord Attil. He goes into The Ants camp during the passball game and steals Kwarli's boots, Zoot's goggles, and all of the hens' eggs. Later while Erin is fishing, he steals Erin's bicycle. He doesn't speak and is thought to be mute when first discovered by Sky and Dan. (episodes 19–26)
- Sunni (played by Garrett Chin), of The Birds – He is the brother and messenger of The Birds leader Lord Attil. (episodes 24–26)

=== Characters from the past/in the mythology ===
As well as characters we have seen in The New Tomorrow, there have been mentions and representations of other people and characters from The Tribe.

==== Bray ====
The "Ants" worship Bray. Throughout series 1–3 of "The Tribe" Bray is one of the focus characters fighting to build a new world and restore order to the city. He is taken by the Technos at the beginning of Series 4, when his girlfriend Amber gives birth to his son. Amber decided to name the baby Bray, after his dad, and so the memory lived on.

==== Zoot ====
In The Ants mythology, Zoot is the evil to Bray's good. They believe that all the problems faced in the past: the technology, the machines, the darkness and the Great Wandering; were all brought about by Zoot. In the Ants story, Zoot was represented as an exaggerated form of how he looked in The Tribe. The name of Zoot is also known to both The Bards and The Privs.

== The tribes ==
There are three main tribes in The New Tomorrow. These are "The Ants", "The Barbs" and "The Privileged". A fourth tribe is introduced near the end of the series' run.

=== The Ants ===
The Ants are a tribe of farmers which appears to consist of the more timid survivors who were in need of someone to lead them and give them a purpose. This role has been left to High Priestess Faygar, who leads the group and has given them a belief system worshipping their ancestors. They pray to Bray (who represents good) and ask for his guidance, while Bray's brother Zoot has become the 'evil' in their mythology and the bringer of all their problems. The Ants look to the day when 'The Ancestor' will return. The Ants are easily distinguished by their markings, which consist of a black mark underneath their eyes and a line with three smaller lines in the centre of their forehead.

=== The Barbs ===
The Barbs are a naturalistic tribe who live in the forest and are protective of their lands and take only what they need to survive in order to conserve the environment. The warrior Zora leads them in their worshipping of the sun, moon and rain. They are good trackers and hunters, and can move above the forest unseen by others. In the centre of the forest is their primitive settlement of wooden huts and camp fires. The group are easily identifiable by the markings on their heads, which consist of a five-pointed fan in the centre of their forehead and a coloured mask of sorts around their eyes. Leanne is the only one seen without this coloured mask.

=== The Privileged ===
The Privileged feel they are superior to other tribes and aim for perfection in both their looks and their actions. They live in the tunnels and rooms underneath an old water dam and are led by Flame. The Privileged have a group of soldiers, called The Warps, who are a strong and courageous people and a group of slaves referred to as The Discards who work in the mines and plantations run by The Privileged, or if they are unlucky they work as The Privileged's personal servants. Movement between these groups is supposed to be determined by all The Privileged, however Flame takes it upon himself to choose many of those who are forced to change groups, even going so far as to 'discard' fellow members of The Privileged at the drop of a hat. The Privs do not have a distinct marking of sorts, rather their clothes are a lot grander than those of The Ants and the Barbs. The Discards are marked by a honeycomb pattern across the centre of their forehead and gray clothing.

=== The Birds ===
The Birds first appeared in episode 24 of The New Tomorrow. They are led by Lord Attil. A messenger of Lord Attil's, Sunni, arrives at The Privileged camp in the same episode. We later find out that Sunni is Lord Attil's brother. Sunni tells Harmony that his tribe has many enemies, because if a tribe refuses to trade with them, they simply take what they want.

== Production ==
The target audience for The New Tomorrow is 8- to 12-year-olds whereas The Tribe had been aimed at a slightly older teenage audience. However, the majority of the fan base are people who grew up watching The Tribe.

The series was mainly conceived by producers Harry Duffin and Raymond Thomson because the main sponsor of the original The Tribe series, Channel 5, had dropped out. The hope had been that The New Tomorrow would cause Channel 5 to reconsider.

Despite Cloud 9's reputation for casting the same actors in all of their shows, no actors from The Tribe were cast. Some did work behind the scenes on the series, namely Caleb Ross (The Tribe's Lex) working on the sound foley and Vanessa Stacey (The Tribe's Alice) who was the vocal coach to the young actors of The New Tomorrow.

== Plot synopsis ==
The first few episodes deal with establishing the characters and setting. The two rivaling tribes of the forest; the warrior Barbs, led by the headstrong Zora, and the farmer Ants, led by the religious and peaceful Faygar, both live in fear of two things: the machines, and the Privileged, a power-hungry tribe led by the equally power-hungry Flame, who is assisted by his advisor Harmony, and warrior leader Shadow.

An outsider named Sky finds his way into the Barb tribe; he doesn't know where he came from, and his memory is messed up. He quickly makes friends there. An Ant whose name is Dan meets the Barb tribe, and decides he wants to be Barb, and not an Ant. Later, the Privs attack the Barb tribe, but Flame is defeated by Sky, and runs away.

During this time, Flame has also let one of the Discarded (the Privileged's slaves) become a Priv. Her name is Gwyn.

Following the attack, the Barbs and the Ants decide they must work together; they join forces, and decide, to avoid argument, that Sky must lead the tribes that are now working together. They make their base in the Ant tribe, and despite a few arguments, are willing to try to get along.

Flame sends Gwyn out as a spy to the tribes. She pretends to be an escaped Discard; she meets Dan, who is actually her brother. Despite her brother being there, she stays loyal to Flame and gives him crucial information. When she is going back to Privs (the Ants and Barbs don't know she's a spy yet) she asks Dan to come with her. He says no, and she goes back on her own.

With the new information, Flame kidnaps Faygar and Sky when they are out on a patrol. The Ants and Barbs are devastated about this, and Zora takes lead of the tribes.

Shadow and Harmony both are starting to get sick of Flame's selfishness, and they begin to scheme against him. Eventually, Flame and the Ant/Barbs decide a way to settle their differences: a game of passball (which is similar to the game Rugby). The Privs narrowly lose, and Harmony overthrows Flame, and Flame is taken by the Ant/Barbs and is kept prisoner. Although Harmony promised they would work together, she betrays Shadow and Discards him.

Faygar and Sky escape from the Discards: so does Shadow, and we don't see him again for the rest of the series (fans think he met with the 'Bird' tribe, see below). The tribes are overjoyed with the return of Faygar and Sky. Faygar and Zora have a few arguments, but then decide to share leadership of the tribe. Flame is set free, although he must work like the rest of the Ants and Barbs. Sky and Dan, out on a patrol, find a strange young boy, but it seems he can't speak. They take him back to the tribe and let him do what he wants.

Harmony needs a personal assistant. She chooses Gwyn. Although it seems like Gwyn is Harmony's slave at first, they soon become good friends. Very close, in fact. A mysterious Bird tribe comes and meets the Privs. It seems they want to trade. Harmony tells them they will meet with Zora and Faygar to discuss trading.

Eventually, they do meet at a meeting. Harmony realises the tribes have more in common than they thought, and it's as if they suddenly become friends. Except for the rude Bird tribe, who soon leave. Harmony also realises that friends are more important than power, and hands the throne back to Flame, who has also changed, and decides to free the Discards. The Privs say they hope they get to have more nights like this. Gwyn thinks about staying with her brother, but decides to stay with Privs, knowing that they'll get to see each other again soon.

After the meeting, the Birds come back to the Ant camp. It turns out the stranger who came to their tribe was their leader's brother. The Bird tribe came to take the boy back. Sky asks why he doesn't talk, and the leader says, "He only talks about things he likes." (The boy only had two lines in the show "Only the Prototype" and "BROTHER!". This means he likes his brother, and the machines). The 4 tribes now seem unified. The Birds leave, and the cast members of the Ant and Barb tribes stand around in a circle and Faygar says, "I'm sure we'll have many more adventures to come." They put their hands together and say "Yay!" and the credits end.

== Broadcast ==
- Australia – Seven Network, premiered 17 September 2005
- United Kingdom – Channel 5, premiered 2 October 2005
