= Jennyfer Jewell =

New Zealand actress

- Born: 7 June 1984 (age 41); England, United Kingdom
- Other name: Jenny Jewell
- Occupations: Television and stage actress
- Years active: 1993-2003

Jennyfer "Jenny" Jewell (born 7 June 1984) is an English-born New Zealand television and stage actress. Although she has been in various other productions, she is best known for her role as Ellie on the science fiction teen drama series The Tribe from 1999 to 2003.

== Biography ==
Born in England, her family moved to Wellington, New Zealand when she was a child and was later raised in the nearby suburb of Kelburn. In 1993, she made her television acting debut in The Storytellers. A ballet dancer for four years, she performed in the stage productions The Thinamajigs (1993) and The Buzz O’Bumble Show (1994). Part of the chorus, she gave a solo performance at the State Opera House. Jewell also began attending the Film Acting Workshop.

During the next two years, she played supporting roles in the Cloud 9's The Enid Blyton Adventure Series and The Enid Blyton Secret Series. She also made a cameo appearance in the Australian science fiction series Mirror Mirror. In early 1999, she and Vanessa Stacey (Alice) made a brief appearance on The Tribe and eventually became permanent cast members during the second and third seasons.

Jewell auditioned for the role with Michael Wesley-Smith (Jack) whom her character would have an on and off romantic relationship. She also continued performing on stage while on the series appearing in Joan of Arc (1999) and Twelfth Night (2000) as well as a television commercial for Telecom Mobile.

Like many cast members, Jewell left the series to continue her education at Queen Margaret College. Following the series cancellation in 2003, she began performing in the annual Capping Show at Otago University and remains one of the main cast members. In 2007, she also joined the cast of the university's student television show Cow TV. However, in 2009, she left both institutions.
