= Paradise Café =

- Genre: Children's comedy-drama
- Written by: Paul Gerstenberger
- Directed by: Danny Mulheron
- Starring: Holly Bodimeade; Pax Baldwin; Halaifonua Finau; Lara Custance; Georgia Fabish
- Countries of origin: New Zealand; United Kingdom
- No. of series: 2
- No. of episodes: 26

Production
- Producers: Dave Gibson; Rachel Davis
- Production locations: Cook Islands, Rarotonga
- Running time: 22–25 minutes
- Production companies: Initial; Gibson Group

Original release
- Network: CBBC; TV2
- Release: 6 January 2009 – 7 February 2011

Paradise Café is a teen television series that premiered on 6 January 2009 on CBBC Channel and TV2.

It was a co-production between New Zealand's Gibson Group and UK company Initial, a division of Endemol. The first series started on 6 January 2009 and ended on 31 March 2009. The second series premiered in the United Kingdom and New Zealand on 17 January 2011 and the final episode aired on 7 February 2011.

== Production ==
In March 2008, the BBC announced a new 13-part drama series set in New Zealand. The series was filmed in Rarotonga, Cook Islands in mid-2008 and was directed by Danny Mulheron.

The BBC announced in May 2010 that they were currently filming the second series. The character Chloe, played by Amelia Reynolds was written out in the first episode of the second series and a new character, Natasha played by Georgia Fabbish was subsequently introduced. Georgia Fabish had previously played a minor character in the first series. The second series started airing on 17 January 2011 in the United Kingdom and in New Zealand.

== Plot ==
In the ancient times, on Paradise Island, an ancient hero named the Sea Born imprisoned an evil sea ghost called Ragnar in an underwater coral prison along with many other sea ghosts. Ragnar swore revenge against the Sea Born.

The sea ghosts are at the core of the story, and appear in almost every episode. They can be from any country, or period of history, but are the ghosts of people that have died at sea (or near to it, such as an aviator whose plane crashed on the island). They can be invisible, appear as human, or be in their "true sea ghost form" with grey skin covered in black blotches, wearing black and white ragged versions of their human clothes. If seen through water their sea ghost form is revealed. This usually happens when they are seen from behind the fish tank in the Paradise Cafe. Any item, such as money or clothes, given away by a sea ghost will turn into sand after a short time away from the ghost.

Centuries later, Megan and Robbo move to Paradise Island along with their father to open up a café there. Robbo quickly befriends Tai, a kind but very clumsy character whilst Megan eventually gets along with a spoilt, rich girl named Abi. A strange girl named Chloe is eager to get to know everyone on the island and it later discovered by the audience that she is a sea ghost spy working for Ragnar. The five kids discover that either Robbo, Tai or Megan is the reincarnation of the Sea Born and Ragnar is looking for them since he needs the Sea Born to escape from the coral prison. Eventually Megan finds out that Chloe is a sea ghost and this infuriates Chloe so she attempts to kill Megan. However, Megan promises not to tell the others (Megan still does not know that she is a spy) and they become best friends making Abi jealous. When Robbo is kidnapped by Ragnar, Chloe is forced to tell everyone that she has been spying for Ragnar all this time. The gang lose all trust in her and it soon transpires that Tai is the reincarnation of the Sea Born. The gang along with Chloe defeat Ragnar.

In the second series, there is no longer any threat to the inhabitants of the café. Although in the series 1 finale Ragnar said he would return, at the start of series 2 it was announced that he had gone. Each episode follows the same pattern: a sea ghost with a problem appears in the café, the kids help him or her, there are some comedic complications, and the ghost returns to the sea. New character Natasha is mistaken for a sea ghost in the first episode of series two, due to her awkward behaviour and unfashionable clothes, so each of the children in turn contrive to "accidentally" throw water at her.

== Cast and characters ==
- Holly Bodimeade as Megan (series 1–2, 26 episodes) – Megan is the younger sister to Robbo and most kind and considerate of the group. She is most concerned about the welfare of the café and often runs it on her own. She often enjoys tidying things up and unlike her friend Abi, she is not really into fashion. She was thought to be the Sea Born until it was revealed to be Tai. She later becomes Chloe's best friend halfway through series one and is the first to find out that she was a sea ghost. During series two, Megan is the most affected when Chloe leaves but later becomes more laid-back after she promises Chloe that she would enjoy herself more.
- Pax Baldwin as Robbo (series 1–2, 26 episodes) – Robbo is Megan's older brother, he always tries to squeeze his way out of trouble, but eventually reforms and becomes more thoughtful towards his hard working sister Megan. His is best friends with Tai and is always kind to the café clients. Near the end of series one, Robbo becomes selfish and big headed and is eventually kidnapped by Ragnar but is saved by Tai after he was revealed to be the Sea Born. Robbo is more considerate and kind throughout series two and he now takes care of the café instead of sister along with Tai. In series 2 he seems to have a stronger relationship with Abi.
- Halaifonua Finau as Tai (series 1–2, 26 episodes) – Tai has lived on the island all his life and lives with his grandmother, who believes in all kinds of stories and superstitions about sea ghosts. Tai is very gullible and can be easily led at times but is also to be very strong-willed especially when his friends are in need of help. He is best friends with Robbo. Tai is revealed to be the Sea Born and eventually seals Ragnar away at the end of series one. Tai somehow loses his powers at the start of series two but unknowingly regains them after the seal holding the sea ghosts breaks again.
- Lara Custance as Abi (series 1–2, 26 episodes) – Abi has a flair for fashion, always on some sort of shopping spree, money comes easy to this chick. She lives in her mother's hotel on the island. Abi can sometimes be selfish and unkind, but she has a good heart. At first, she disliked Megan for the way she dressed however she learned from her mistakes and they later became good friends. Throughout series one she seemed to have a one sided rivalry between Chloe and was the first to believe her as a traitor. During series two, Abi is not as spoilt as she was in the first series after the hotel loses most of its guests due to the pollution. In series 2 she seems to have a stronger relationship with Robbo.
- Amelia Reynolds as Chloe (series 1–2, 15 episodes) – Chloe is a 1950s babe, she is introduced as a quirky but fun character eager to make friends on the island. Her fashion style is true 1950s as is her personality and it is not until later in the series that Chloe is revealed to be a sea ghost who is working for Ragnar to find the Sea Born and kill him or her. Megan is first to find out her secret but they later become best friends. At the end of the first series Chloe betrays Ragnar and reunites with the gang. At the start of series two, she reverts to her sea ghost form and it forced to leave the island. Before leaving, she made Megan promise that she enjoy herself a lot more.
- Georgia Fabish as Natasha (series 2, 13 episodes) – Natasha is introduced in series two as Peter's assistant and an amateur reporter searching for a story. She appears to be quite clumsy and often luck is not on her side but she is also quite friendly. She knows that the rest of the gang are hiding a secret from her and she is determined to find out. At the start of series two, Natasha, whilst exploring accidentally breaks the seal holding all the sea ghosts and causes all the pollution to return to the island.

== Episodes ==
=== Series One (2009) ===
No.	Title	Directed by	Written by	Original release date	Prod. code
1	"Grand Opening"	Danny Mulheron	Paul Gerstenberger	6 January 2009	1.1
Robbo, Megan and their father move onto Paradise Island, Megan sets up a café on the island, Robbo befriends the clumsy Tai, meanwhile Megan meets the spoilt Abi, Megan and Abi do not get along. Megan, Robbo and Tai go diving and see a strange mark on a rock, they all touch it and it lets out some strange black sea weed that grips onto them and is quite vicious. Later Megan, Tai, Robbo and Abi meet Chloe. The five discover that either Robbo, Tai or Megan is a reincarnation of the Sea Born, an ancient hero who imprisoned Ragnar and the sea ghosts (people who died at sea) in the sea bed, Ragnar is still imprisoned in a coral prison but needs the Sea Born's body to escape and that sea ghosts look normal until you look at them through water. The five stop the ghost ruining the café's grand opening and decide to all help running the café. It is revealed to the audience that Chloe is a sea ghost and a spy for Ragnar! Victoria (Abi's rich mother) employs Robbo and Megan's dad to do something about the black waters.
2	"Café Under Siege"	Danny Mulheron	Paul Gerstenberger	13 January 2009	1.2
Robbo and Tai see a girl in the café, they both fall in love with her and get in a competition with each other to see who can a kiss from her first. Tai and Robbo soon fall out but what they do not know is that the girl is actually a sea ghost. She mistakes Robbo for her ex-lover who abandoned her and her clan and left them to sink. Robbo and Tai are locked in the café that night and make up, the girl and her clan attack the café but they realise Robbo is not the one they are looking for because of his strong friendship with Tai and leave. Megan and Abi become friends.
3	"Reflections"	Danny Mulheron	Elly Brewer	20 January 2009	1.3
A sea ghost hired by Ragnar sells a mirror to Abi, Abi is sucked into the mirror and the sea ghost changes to look like Abi. Meanwhile Robbo bets his sister she can not work at the café for a whole day. "Abi" shows up and is attracted to Robbo, which creeps everyone out. Chloe does not like the idea of Ragnar hiring another ghost. While Megan is trying to sneak back into the café she sees that the Abi is an impostor! Tai, Robbo and Megan free Abi and the impostor makes a run for it, Chloe tells Ragnar what happened and Ragnar destroys the Abi impostor.
4	"Stage Fright"	Danny Mulheron	Chris Denne and Joel Jenkins	27 January 2009	1.4
When the café is overrun by a crowd of bored sea ghosts waiting to be entertained, Robbo decides there is no business like show business. Paradise Café's Got Talent is born. Despite Megan's disapproval, Robbo hires a sea ghost from 1930s Berlin called Doctor Herzog, a stage hypnotist and true showman, who is bound to delight the audience. But Tai doubts that the hypnotist's act is as innocent as it seems. Even after talent night is over, after the hypnotist had hypnotised Abi and Megan, Abi just cannot stop herself singing and dancing, and Megan is irresistibly drawn to the hypnotist's lair. Herzog has a wicked plan to discover the true identity of the Sea Born and deliver them to Ragnar, hypnotising Megan to see if she is the Sea Born
5	"For the Love of Money"	Danny Mulheron	Linton Chiswick	3 February 2009	1.5
Tai decides to help the café become more popular by befriending a sea ghost businessman named Marcus. Chloe picks three of the devil's fruit, Ragnar says that if the Sea Born digests the devil's fruit they will be sick, then they will know who the Sea Born is. Tai makes the café more popular by buying a disco ball, a pinball machine, a Juke box and a smoothie maker. Abi wants to attend a party her mother is having that will have the no.1 boyband there, but Victoria says she can only go if she gets a friend to come too. All the money that the café earns is actually ghost money that disappears (because the only customers are ghosts) so they do not have enough to pay for all the fancy stuff Tai got. Marcus eats all of the devil's fruit to Chloe's annoyance. They all meet the boyband and Marcus goes to Victoria's party only to get a cake in the face, while the boy band play at the Paradise Café.
6	"Trilbies and Tribulations"	Danny Mulheron	Steve Turner	10 February 2009	1.6
Megan's determined to improve the menu at the café, but Robbo will not let her have their mum's recipe for yummy banana brownies. Which leaves Megan with only one alternative: steal it! But when a sea ghost steals it from Megan and Robbo finds out, she is in major trouble. Desperate Megan asks for help from hopeless New York private investigator Eddie Chisel, who pins the crime on his arch enemy, the gangster Joe Quartz. But it seems like bully boy Joe's not going to stop at the recipe, and he steals the café as well! Megan and Eddie cook up a plan to outwit the gangsters and with a little help from Tai's latest crazy ghost-sucking invention, they try to trap Joe and get back the café and the recipe. With all this ghost busting going on, Chloe has to do some quick thinking to avoid her ghostly identity being discovered but Megan soon discovers Chloe's true identity.
7	"Secrets"	Danny Mulheron	Chris Ellis	17 February 2009	1.7
Megan, still reeling from the discovery that Chloe is a sea ghost, is definitely not in the mood to deal with grumpy ghost Matu. An old Pacific Island priest, Matu wants to dig for buried treasure under the café and he will not take no for an answer. But Megan has bigger things than treasure on her mind when Chloe begs her not to tell the others about her ghostly identity. Abi, Tai and Robbo are all desperate for cash, so they agree to help Matu dig at night. But none of them realise that Matu's treasure is an ancient staff that could identify the Sea Born – or that the evil ghost Ragnar wants it more than any of them.
8	"The Rival Café"	Danny Mulheron	Paul Gerstenberger	24 February 2009	1.8
Victoria sets up a rival café called Happiness Café just opposite the Paradise Café. Megan tells Abi this, but Abi does not care (she is still annoyed that Megan is best friends with Chloe) and is actually helping to run it! Megan and Abi go all out to get customers and to steal customers from each other. Megan gets her new ghost friend to get his older brothers to ruin the Happiness Café. The ghost boy agrees on the condition they become friends, Megan agrees. Then his brothers agree on the condition that she does whatever they ask, Megan agrees. The Happiness Café is damaged, but then the brothers tell Megan to give them the Paradise Café! The ghost boy apologises to Megan and convinces his brothers to leave, they decide to go on a trip to America (where they were going before their boat sank). The Happiness Café closes down since Victoria could not keep paying for the rental float it was on.
9	"The Competition"	Danny Mulheron	Paul Gerstenberger	3 March 2009	1.9
Chloe comes up with a great way to make some money for the cash-strapped café. If the best swimmer enters the island's dive competition, they will win big prize money and save the café. And Chloe will be one step closer to discovering the identity of the Sea Born, who is sure to be a whizz in the water. But Chloe is surprised to find that the best at breath holding is actually Megan. However, Megan is kidnapped by an Italian sea ghost prince and is injured in the escape so Tai has to take her place. Chloe soon suspects that Tai is the Sea Born.
10	"Tai's New Friend"	Danny Mulheron	Paul Gerstenberger	10 March 2009	1.10
Tai is left in charge of the café while Megan and Robbo are helping Peter prepare a big coral presentation for Victoria, but a gorgeous bad girl called Rose arrives and tempts Tai to leave the café and hang out with her. Meanwhile, despite being grounded, Abi has shown up to serve the queue of waiting customers at the closed café. But it seems she has been swindled by a sea ghost and ends up being bound and gagged in a net on the cafe's ceiling. Unable to free herself, Abi knows that Victoria is on her way to the café to hear Peter's big presentation. If she finds her there then she will probably sack Peter, and the coral will not be saved. Abi is able to ring Megan from her mobile but her gag prevents Megan from being able to understand her. But, with the help of Chloe, Megan and Robbo understand what is going on and rush to the café. The gang and Tai eventually defeat Rose and succeed in hiding Abi from Victoria. Peter is also able to successfully convince Victoria to finance his device to save the coral.
11	"Bring It On"	Danny Mulheron	David Brechin-Smith	17 March 2009	1.11
It is the Festival of the Sea on Paradise Island and Abi and Megan are both desperate to win the smoothie-making competition and the accompanying big cash prize. Marty, a surf dude sea ghost who lost a leg in a shark attack, hops up to find his missing limb. He is very competitive and manages to bring out the worst in Megan and Abi, who will stop at nothing to beat each other. Marty thinks he has a secret ingredient guaranteed to make the best smoothie ever, but he will only reveal it to the one who finds his leg. The trouble is, it is still stuck on the shark's fin. Tai revisits a place from his dreams and comes face to face with Ragnar who tells him he is the Sea Born, with some extra-special powers.
12	"A Map of Stars"	Danny Mulheron	Paul Gerstenberger	24 March 2009	1.12
A Maori navigator and her crew arrive at the Café saying only the Sea Born can find the black pearl, the Sea Born needs to find the black pearl so they can finally have it. Tai and Robbo go diving for it, the sharks lead them to it, they return the pearl to the crew and Robbo takes all the credit, this makes everyone think Robbo is the Sea Born. Tai is given a coin that allows him whatever he wants when he flips it. Chloe reveals to the gang that Ragnar is corrupting Tai with the coin she also reveals that she is a sea ghost working for Ragnar. This cuts off any trust the others had for Chloe. The navigator reveals that because Robbo acted big-headed when he was the Sea Born it means he is not the Sea Born, but Tai is!
13	"The Final Showdown"	Danny Mulheron	Paul Gerstenberger	31 March 2009	1.13
Robbo is kidnapped by Ragnar, Tai agrees to be Ragnar's host body if he lets Robbo go, Robbo gathers the others, Chloe betrays Ragnar, they all defeat Ragnar, re-imprisoning him but keeping the ghosts out, the gang make up with Chloe. Robbo and Megan's dad blocks off the black sea weed, he says that they can live on the island to the relief of Robbo and Megan who did not want to leave their friends behind. Later, the gang all celebrates!

=== Series Two (2011) ===
No. overall	No. in series	Title	Directed by	Written by	Original release date	Prod. code
14	1	"Being Natasha"	Danny Mulheron	David Brechin-Smith	17 January 2011	2.1
With the coral seal in place, the kids are safe from Ragnar and party hard. Tai enjoys his Sea Born status but is rocked when his powers fail. New girl Natasha arrives to work with Peter in the lab but driven by curiosity she accidentally breaks the seal and the pollution is released, as well as the sea ghosts. Meanwhile, Chloe's ghost form returns and despite Tai's attempt to help her, she is forced to leave the island and return to the sea.
15	2	"Edison Tesla″"	Danny Mulheron	Andrew Gunn	18 January 2011	2.2
When a strange inventor called Edison Tesla shows up, Robbo realises the ghosts are back. But as he is on café cleanup duty, he thinks that maybe this time they could be helpful. Tesla makes Robbo's vacuum cleaner mighty powerful but when Abi borrows the machine, it causes mayhem for Victoria. Meanwhile, Tesla's made a great invention that is wrecking the café... and with only minutes to go before the inspector arrives!
16	3	"Tigerlily"	Danny Mulheron	Briar Grace Smith	19 January 2011	2.3
Ghost Pirate Tigerlily has been rejected as a crewmember on the Black Star for the last three hundred years. She thinks it's because she is a girl, but Megan, Robbo and Tai have another theory – her attitude. While Victoria threatens Abi with compulsory water aerobics duty, the boys try to teach Tigerlily to be more cooperative. It takes a crisis before she'll admit she has an attitude problem. In the meantime, she threatens to spend the next three years showing the boys just how feisty she really is!
17	4	"Angel Power"	Danny Mulheron	David Brechin-Smith	20 January 2011	2.4
Angel the ghost glam rock pro-wrestler turns up with one thing on her mind: to prove she is the greatest wrestler of all time. While Natasha struggles with a terrible allergy, Tai confidently agrees to take Angel on. Then Abi and Megan experience Angel's training session and they fear for Tai's life. They want Angel to win quickly and get out of there. Tai rescues Robbo from near death. Tai then has his fight with Angel, and loses.
18	5	"The Entertainer"	Danny Mulheron	Chris Ellis	24 January 2011	2.5
The ghost of an Entertainer arrives at the café, determined to prove he is the funniest joker ever. He plays cruel gags and gets mad when no one laughs. Fearing someone will be hurt if he carries on, the kids try to teach him that humiliating people is not funny. At the same time, Abi and Megan compete for the attention of Max the surfer. Abi's surprised when Megan wins – but not as surprised as Natasha who, after sabotaging the coral seal, sees the Entertainer vanish before her very eyes...
19	6	"The Cat Burglar"	Danny Mulheron	Andrew Gunn	25 January 2011	2.6
The ghost of a Cat Burglar wants Natasha's locket as a love gift for his girlfriend. But he soon finds out that being a ghost and trying to steal something real has its problems. Meanwhile, Robbo tries to impress the journalist from 'Street' magazine, mistaking the Cat Burglar for the magazine's photographer. He has got some competition from Victoria who's found a unique take on being 'cool'.
20	7	"Two Men One Boat"	Danny Mulheron	Sarah Nathan	25 January 2011	2.7
Robbo and Tai enter the Paradise Island fishing contest but things soon start to go wrong.
21	8	"The Aviatrix"	Danny Mulheron	Deborah Wilton	27 January 2011	2.8
The ghost of a 1930's aviatrix starts destroying ceiling fans as she tries to find out what went wrong with her airplane's propellers.
22	9	"Treasure Hunt"	Danny Mulheron	Ben Marshall and Edwin McRae	31 January 2011	2.9
Megan finds herself captivated by a new arrival: the handsome teen explorer Tom, who's searching for the Paradise Island Gold. Enthralled by his talks of adventure, she goes along in spite of the fact that he is a sea ghost. Before they leave, Natasha encounters Tom, her first real ghost! However when Tom finds his treasure and vanishes, Natasha is peeved and Megan feels lost. She is thrilled when he returns later that night and gives her the treasure, along with her first kiss.
23	10	"Miss Paradise Island"	Danny Mulheron	Kate McDermott	31 January 2011	2.10
Victoria stages a beauty pageant at the hotel.
24	11	"Alonzo's Quest"	Danny Mulheron	Ben Marshall	2 February 2011	2.11
Peter reveals that they will very soon have to leave the island.
25	12	"The Moment of Truth"	Danny Mulheron	Joss King	3 February 2011	2.12
Hal Redman, a 1960s Hollywood director, wants to make a movie and finally capture his 'moment of truth'. Unfortunately, ghostly Hal wants Natasha to be his leading lady. Megan stumbles on a scam run by Abi and Victoria, . Tai believes her lies but is later disappointed to find he has been deceived. Worse still, Natasha has called in the Ghost Trapper!
26	13	"Ghost Trapper"	Danny Mulheron	Andrew Gunn	7 February 2011	2.13
Boris Jensen, Ghost Trapper, is on Paradise Island seeking ghosts. Tai worries that his Sea Born identity is registering on the ghost-detecting device and feels hunted. Peter unwittingly chats with a ghost chef, and finds an explosive solution to the pollution. Meanwhile, the gang determine to prove to Jensen that the rumours of ghosts were all a set-up. Jensen discovers Tai's supernatural status, shocking Natasha. She realises she will ruin Tai's life if she pursues her ambition – so what will she do? How will it all end?
