= The Storytellers =

American Bluegrass band

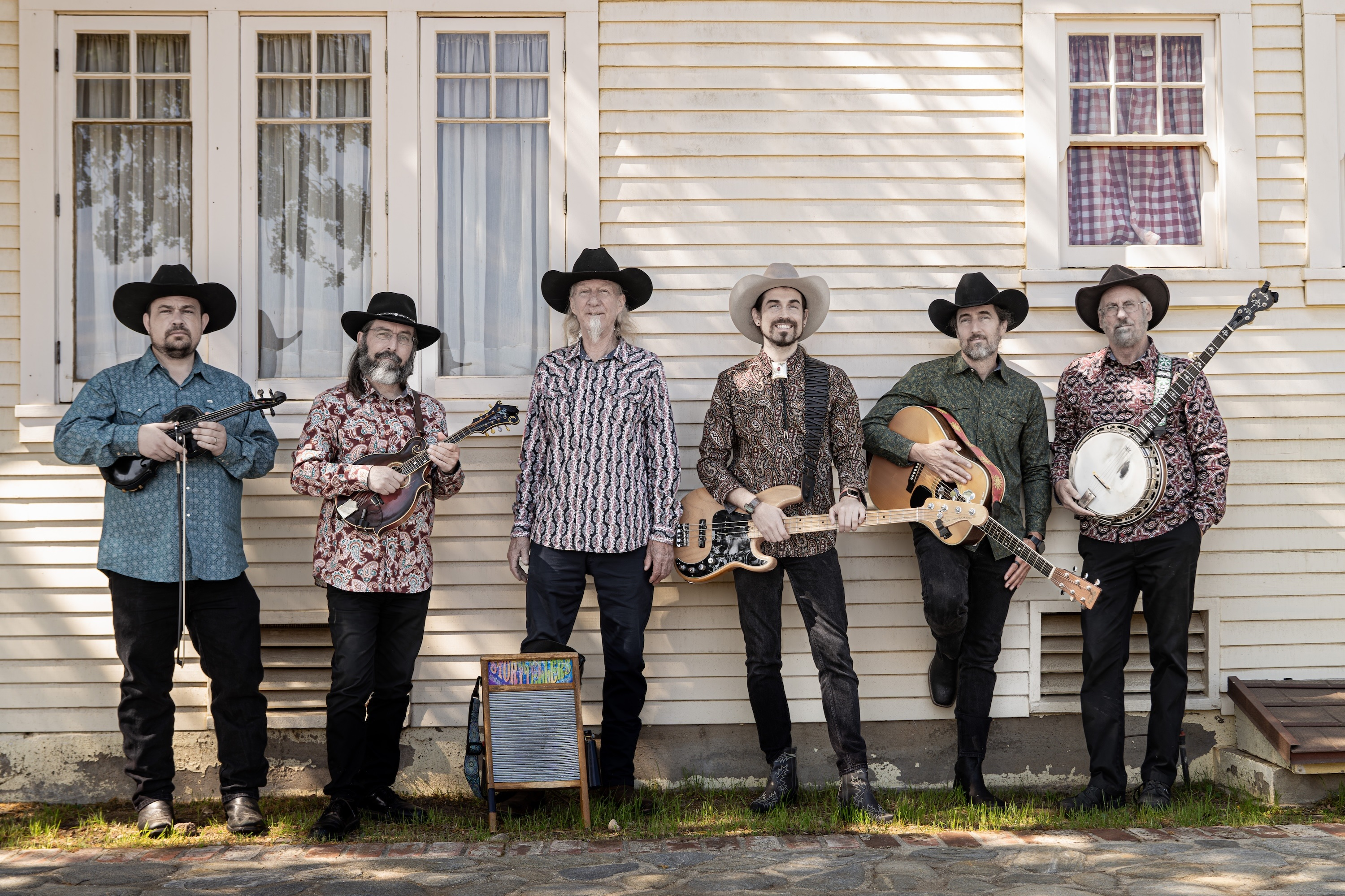
- The Storytellers at the Cowboy Festival in Santa Clarita in 2025.

Background information
- Origin: Los Angeles, California
- Genres: Bluegrass
- Years active: 2017–present
- Members: Scott Diehl; Lance Frantzich; Tyler Emerson; Ethan Van Thillo; Steve Stelmach
- Website: www.storytellersband.com

The Storytellers are an American Bluegrass group from Los Angeles, California. They have been described as "progressive bluegrass," using more instruments and storytelling to extend the length of traditional folk songs.

== Career ==
The Storytellers were formed in 2017 as a duo, but grew into a five member band by 2018. They had a music residency at Treasure Island Hotel and Casino and also performed regularly for Bob Stane at The Coffee Gallery.

From 2023-24, they performed over 50 live shows which included the Brookdale Bluegrass Festival with Peter Rowan, the Prescott Bluegrass Festival, the Calico Bluegrass Festival, and at the National Association of Music Merchants. As of 2024, the group consists of members Scott Diehl (Guitar, Vocals), Lance Frantzich (Bass, Vocals), Tyler Emerson (Fiddle, Vocals), Ethan Van Thillo (Mandolin), and Steve Stelmach (Washboard, Percussion).
