= Amy Morrison =

New Zealand actress (born 1984)

- Born: Amy Louise Morrison; 18 July 1984 (age 41); New Zealand
- Occupations: Film and television actress
- Years active: 1993–2000

Amy Morrison (born 18 July 1984) is a New Zealand-born film and television actress best known for her role as Zandra in Cloud 9's The Tribe. She also had a brief but memorable role in the historical fantasy series Xena: Warrior Princess and Hercules: The Legendary Journeys as the younger version of Hope, the daughter of Gabrielle. Morrison also played small roles in the feature films Jack Be Nimble and Every Woman's Dream as well as appearances on Jack of All Trades, Shortland Street and William Shatner's A Twist in the Tale among other work in television and film.

== Biography ==
Morrison was one of six children born in New Zealand. She began appearing in television commercials at an early age and made her acting debut in the 1993 horror film Jack Be Nimble. The following year, she appeared in the television movies Hercules and the Circle of Fire and Hercules in the Underworld. Partly based on these performances, she eventually had a small role as Gabrielle's daughter Hope on Xena: Warrior Princess and Hercules: The Legendary Journeys.

The character proved to be her breakout role and, in April 1999, she appeared in the starring role in Jessica's Diary, the ninth episode of William Shatner's A Twist in the Tale. Later that year, she was cast in the role of Zandra in another Cloud 9 television project, The Tribe. At age 14, she was introduced as the primary romantic interest of Lex (Caleb Ross). Portrayed as self-absorbed and vain, she served as a "mother figure" to other members of the group (this role would later be taken over by co-star Victoria Spence's character Salene). Her character was involved in an abusive relationship with Lex, however they later married and she became pregnant. She remained on the show for one year before deciding to leave in order to focus on her education. Her departure caused a significant group of fans to start an online petition for her to be brought back on the show, despite her character having been killed off, and is still active as of September 2008.

Her last major role was in a guest appearance on the television series Jack of All Trades in 2000.

Since then she has not been in any TV shows and appeared in pictures in The Tribe reunion September 2009 with many of the characters from The Tribe.

== Selected filmography ==
=== Film ===
Year	Title	Role
1993	Jack Be Nimble	Young Sister
1994	Hercules and the Circle of Fire	Cold Child
1994	Hercules in the Underworld	Cold Child

=== Television ===
Year	Title	Role	Nº episodes
1996	Every Woman's Dream	Samantha age 10	1
1998	Xena: Warrior Princess	Hope	1
1998	Hercules: The Legendary Journeys	Hope	2
1999	A Twist in the Tale	Jessica	1
1999	The Tribe	Zandra	53
2000	Jack of All Trades	Annie	1
