= Jaimee Kaire-Gataulu =

New Zealand actress (born 1987)

- Born: 7 April 1987 (age 39); Auckland, New Zealand
- Occupation: Television actress
- Years active: 1993-2002

Jaimee Kaire-Gataulu (born 7 April 1987) is a New Zealand television actress who is best known for her role as Cloe in Cloud 9's series, The Tribe. She played the long-running role in Series 1 through 4 and also proved to be one of the show's favourite characters with fans.

== Biography ==
Kaire-Gataulu was born at St. Helens Hospital in Auckland, New Zealand. She began appearing in short films and commercials at the age of 5. She made her acting debut in the short film The Kiwi and The Water Melon (1993) followed by appearances in two other short films, The Birthday (1994) and Clown Story (1996). Her other television roles included parts in The Visitation and the popular action hero show Xena: The Warrior Princess. She also worked as a reporter on What Now.

During the series, she was particularly close to co-star Dan Weekes-Hannah (Ved), with whom her character would later become involved in a romantic storyline. While filming The Tribe, Jaimee lived in the cast house with Weekes. During an interview, Weekes claimed that they flirted together and dated, which was against the rules. Weekes claimed that an impromptu train ride to Auckland with Kaire-Gataulu caused them to miss a scheduled shooting. Their absence caused shooting to be rescheduled, costing the studio upwards of one hundred thousand dollars. Both were dropped from the show, Kaire-Gataulu being fired immediately while Weeks was written out later on in the season. The pair broke up soon after The Tribe ceased production.

In 2008 Jaimee gave an interview where she talked about life after The Tribe. She is a mother now, to three boys: her eldest son named Phoenix and two toddlers Preston (2012) and Brooklyn (2013). Though she has an agent, she is currently not acting.
