= Beth Chote =

New Zealand actress

- Born: 27 January 1991 (age 35)
- Occupation: Actress

Beth Chote (born 27 January 1991) is a New Zealand born actress.

== The Tribe ==
Beth Chote acted as Lottie in 21 episodes of television series The Tribe during its fifth series, screened in 2003.

== The Killian Curse ==
Chote appeared as Katie Lockhart in 2006 New Zealand children's television series The Killian Curse.

== Reservoir Hill ==
Chote played the lead character Beth Connolly in eight episode long interactive online drama series Reservoir Hill in 2009. In the following year the show received an Emmy award from the International Academy of Television Arts and Sciences.
