= Atlantis High =

2001–2002 New Zealand television series

- Genre: Teen comedy; Melodrama; Spoof
- Created by: Raymond Thompson
- Written by: Charles Hodges; Joe Boyle; Andy Smith; Tony Osborn; James Wyllie; Harry Duffin; David Fox; Mike Kenny
- Directed by: Raymond Thompson; Janet Stubbings; Colin McColl; Danny Mulheron; Andrew Merrifield; Charlie Haskell; Chris Arnold; John Reid
- Starring: Michael Wesley-Smith; Robyn Malcolm; Elizabeth McGlinn
- Theme music composer: Raymond Thompson
- Opening theme: "Sunset Cove"; The Tommy Loungerillo Orchestra
- Ending theme: "Sunset Cove"; The Tommy Loungerillo Orchestra
- Countries of origin: New Zealand; United Kingdom
- Original language: English
- No. of seasons: 1
- No. of episodes: 26

Production
- Executive producer: Raymond Thompson
- Producer: Debra Kelleher-Smith
- Cinematography: Sean O'Donnell
- Editors: Wayne Cook; Ben Sinclair
- Camera setup: Multi-camera
- Running time: 25 minutes
- Production company: Cloud 9 Screen Entertainment Group

Original release
- Network: Channel 5 (UK)
- Release: 8 September 2001 – 2 March 2002

Atlantis High is a teen comedy melodrama television series, filmed in New Zealand, that aired on Channel 5 in the United Kingdom from September 2001 to March 2002. Atlantis High both parodies soap operas and pays homage to spoof television.

== Overview ==
The series revolves around 16-year-old Giles Gordon (Michael Wesley-Smith), who has just moved to Sunset Cove, "a beautiful coastal surfing town where the sun is always shining, the people are all beautiful and everything is perfect... or so it seems". He enrolls in Atlantis High School, where he soon discovers that Sunset Cove is unlike any town he has ever seen: populated by double-agents, aliens and high school students with blue hair and pointy ears, its inhabitants are eccentric lunatics who at times turn into superheroes or other whimsical figures.

== Cast and characters ==
=== Main ===
- Michael Wesley-Smith as Giles: Giles Gordon has just moved to Sunset Cove and quickly becomes an outsider at Atlantis High. Giles soon falls in love with Octavia, and becomes friends with fellow school outsiders Jet and Beanie.
- Robyn Malcolm as Violet: Violet Profusion is the scheming principal of Atlantis High.
- Ken Blackburn as Mr. Dorsey: Atlantis High's science teacher, he is secretly an alien, and is looking for the lost city of Atlantis to save his species.
- Ray Henwood as Commander Vermont: He commands the local military forces in Sunset Cove, and is aware of the alien presence. Commander Vermont is initially unaware that he shares a secret past with his wife and Dorothy.
- Loren Horsley as Sabrina: She is the glamorous, ultra-popular girl at Atlantis High, and will do anything to stay on top.
- Elizabeth McGlinn as Octavia: Unbeknownst to her parents and schoolmates, Octavia Vermont is secretly an agent working for the Agency, under the direction of Q. She and Giles have a tempestuous relationship.
- Todd Emerson as Beanie: He is a strange student at Atlantis High with out-sized ears. Beanie's memories appear to have been compromised, and his origin is one of the bigger mysteries at Atlantis High.
- Lucy Gamble as Sophie: Many at Atlantis High consider Sophie May to be deranged, and Sophie claims she is haunted by a "poltergeist". She is initially infatuated with Antony, but her attentions later turn elsewhere.
- Lee Donoghue as Josh: The ultra-rich, vain and conceited jock of Atlantis High, Josh Montana secretly moonlights as the Silver Lining, the ersatz superhero of Sunset Cove.
- Laura Wilson as Jet: Distinguished by her blue hair, Jet is a conspiracy theorist and outsider at Atlantis High. She soon becomes friends with Giles and Beanie.
- Victoria Spence as Antonia / Antony: As Giles observes, Antonia and Antony appear to inhabit the same body. Antonia is a girly-girl who always wears a bow in her hair, while Antony is a quintessential "angry young man". Antony leaves Sunset Cove in the sixth episode, while Antonia gets caught up helping Mr. Dorsey.
- Joanne Mildenhall as Dorothy: She is Giles' mother, who has just moved with Giles and Grandpa to Sunset Cove. She often disapproves of Giles, and doesn't realize at first that she doesn't remember aspects of her past, or her connection to the Vermonts.
- Richard Lambeth as Coach Shane: He is the narcissistic sports coach at Atlantis High. He sometimes mentors Josh.

=== Recurring ===
- Miriama Smith as Vita: The bombshell school secretary of Atlantis High, she is annoyed by Violet, and desires Coach Shane.
- Bevin Linkhorn as Don: The odd custodian of Atlantis High, he often gets caught up in the happenings at the school.
- Jane Waddell as Mrs. Vermont: She is the constantly wig-wearing wife of the Commander, and Octavia's mother. She shares a secret past with the Commander and Dorothy.
- James Ordish as Inner Child: He is the manifestation of Giles' inner child, who gives Giles unsolicited advice.
- Brian Sergent as Mr. Quentin / Q: He is Octavia's mysterious boss at the Agency, and his true agenda is unrevealed.
- Martyn Sanderson as Grandpa: Grandpa Gordon is Giles' grandfather who moves to Sunset Cove with Giles and Dorothy. While sometimes cantankerous, Grandpa knows more than he is telling.
- Megan Alatini as Dr. Leggz: She is Sunset Cove's glamorous local therapist, whom Giles and other go see to work out their problems.
- Tom McCrory as Lew Siffer: Lew is seemingly the mastermind behind several businesses and organizations in Sunset Cove. He and Violet Profusion often work and scheme together.
- Sam Husson as Vortex: Vortex is an alien in the flying saucer that Mr. Dorsey is in contact with.
- Lyndee-Jane Rutherford as Nebula: Nebula is another alien in the flying saucer.
- Des Morgan as Xeron: Xeron is the third alien in the flying saucer.
- Brian Childs as Elvis: Elvis is often seen around Sunset Cove.

== Production ==
Atlantis High was produced by Cloud 9 Screen Entertainment, a British-owned company based in New Zealand. Production on the series began in 2000 in Wellington, New Zealand.

== Broadcast ==
The series was commissioned, originally for 52 half-hour episodes, for broadcast in 2001 by Channel 5 in the United Kingdom. Despite being filmed in New Zealand, the show was never aired on New Zealand's TV3.
