= Vicky Rodewyk =

Actress, model and dancer

- Born: 20 November 1988 (age 37); New Zealand
- Years active: 1999–present
- Known for: Gel in The Tribe

Vicky Rodewyk (born 20 November 1988) is an actress, photographic model and dancer from New Zealand. She has appeared in various TV commercials and shows, such as Barney, Shortland Street and an episode of Cloud 9's series Revelations – The Initial Journey. Vicky is best known for playing the role of moaning air-head Gel in the Cloud 9 produced TV series The Tribe. She was one of 5 new main characters introduced to the fifth and final series of the show. Vicky has also appeared on the ABC TV produced TV show Strictly Dancing with dance partner Sean Patterson, she started dancing at two years old and teaches dance and yoga. In 2008, Vicky appeared in the hit show Power Rangers: Jungle Fury playing a minor role, the character Gabby, a dance student. She featured in episode 23, 'Fear and Phantoms'.
