= Vanessa Stacey =

New Zealand actress, musician, director, producer, playwright and comedian

- Born: Vanessa Eve Stacey; August 7, 1978 (age 47); Central Otago, New Zealand
- Occupations: Actress, musician, director, producer, singer, playwright, comedian
- Years active: 2001–present
- Website: Official website

Vanessa Stacey (born 7 August 1978) is a New Zealand film, television, and stage actress. She is also a musician, director, producer, playwright, singer, songwriter and comedian.

Stacey is well known as Alice in the New Zealand science fiction series The Tribe and as Brenda Blue in the British version of Jay Jay the Jet Plane. She also had roles in the first and third parts of The Lord of the Rings (The Fellowship of the Ring and The Return of the King), Outrageous Fortune, Out of the Blue, Woodville, and How to Murder Wife.

== Biography ==
Vanessa Stacey was born in Invercargill, New Zealand. At the age of 7, she and her older brother Martin appeared as film extras with her father Richard Stacey, a stuntman, in the 1986 post-apocalyptic film Battle Truck and the 1988 fantasy-adventure film Willow. She became involved with community theatre groups, debating teams and theatre sports groups during high school as well as performing in a number of school choirs. Stacey also joined her first band during this time, recording several cover songs, and began performing at local nightclubs the following year.

After her graduation, Stacey became a hairdresser at Ali Barbers and eventually started her own salon, Absolutely Fabulous Hair Design, in 1998. That same year, she joined Hagley Theatre Company where she remained a regular cast member for over two years and acted in various stage productions including Charlotte's Web, Animal Farm and The Cherry Orchard. Appearing in the filmsHeavenly Creatures (1994) and The Frighteners (1996) during this time, she decided to become a full-time actress and closed her salon after eight months.

Stacey attended Christchurch Jazz School gaining a certificate in jazz theory and performance, before moving to Wellington in 1998. Within three weeks, she appeared in one of the leading roles in The Young And Hungry Festival giving the freelance actress her first breakout role. Stacey attended the Toi Whakaari New Zealand Drama School receiving a diploma in directing performance art

Stacey then wrote and directed the one-act play, Work in Progress, which ran for three seasons. She spent the next year or so performing in the Wellington-area, including guest starring on the comedy television show Pulp Comedy, before she was cast with Jennyfer Jewell (Ellie) as Alice in the long-running teen drama series The Tribe. Although the two were initially brought in for a one-time appearance, the characters proved so popular that Cloud 9 brought them back as regular cast members during the second and third seasons. Stacey's appearance in particular, according to a viewer pool by Channel 5, the episode was the highest ever received for a guest star. In 2001, she and other cast members performing on the spin-off album Abe Messiah, providing backup vocals for "Banging The Drum" and "Beep Beep".

On 14 April 2001, Stacey made a special appearance on Channel 5's teen block The Core as part of The Tribe promotional tour in the United Kingdom. Her appearance led to several other hosting spots on Channel 5, including the Channel 5 Road Show that summer, where she performed an 8-minute stand-up comedy routine. However, Stacey became best known as Brenda Blue in the British version of Jay Jay the Jet Plane, playing a mechanic who maintained and looked after her planes.

While in London, she was also involved in The Lord of the Rings providing the voiceover for one of the hobbit The Lord of the Rings: The Fellowship of the Ring. She also filmed a number of scenes for the film, most notably appearing as one of the guest hobbits at the 111th Birthday party of hobbit Bilbo Baggins, although her scenes were cut from the final film. In December 2001, she attended the London premiere of Fellowship of the Ring with Elijah Wood, Liv Tyler, Orlando Bloom and Ian McKellen. She later appeared on screen as a minor character in a scene with Frodo in the third and final part of the series The Lord of the Rings: The Return of the King.

Stacey spent the next two years teaching music and drama and working part-time as a hairdresser while in London. She also directed several television programs for Channel 5 and the BBC before returning to New Zealand in late 2004.

She and several other former cast members returned for the season five finale, but the show was canceled before the sixth season began filming. Following the show's cancellation, she was involved in the spin-off series The New Tomorrow as acting and voice coach. Former cast member Caleb Ross (Lex) also worked as a foley artist on the show.

In 2005, Stacey had a guest appearance in the Hercules television miniseries and, the next year, appeared in a supporting role in Robert Sarkies's drama Out of the Blue.

2006 to 2021 Actor/Director include: Shortland St, Outrageous Fortune, Out of the Blue, Aftershock, Girls V's Boys, Woodville, How to Murder Your Wife, Wellington Paranormal, Cousins, Under The Vines, Toured her third play a solo called 'Postmortem' and Directed several theatre productions including 'The Tempest'

2017 She is currently a singer of the group's Chocolate Box, The Bones, Double Trouble, Los Helios and Vanessa Stacey and The Shuffle. She also tutor's the Screen Acting class at the National Youth Drama School of New Zealand, also referred to as NYDS and Creative Processes at Massey University where she has held two Artist Residencies

Music Releases include: 2016 Released two singles "Monster" and "Seeds" with Twig Pigeon 2017 Released singles "Stood Still live acoustic" and " Stood Still Feat: Chris Ck and her band The Shuffle 2019 Released single "Will We Learn 2019 Released single "Chemistry" with Twig Pigeon 2020 Released single Call 2020 Featured on Fun and Funner album

In 2024, Stacey appeared as the supporting character "Angelina" in Ant Timpson's adventure comedy drama Bookworm. Stacey compared her character to a Roald Dahl creation.
