= Ari Boyland =

New Zealand stage and television actor (born 1987)

- Born: 10 August 1987 (age 39); Lower Hutt, New Zealand
- Occupation: Actor
- Years active: 1999-present
- Spouse: Tara Spadaro (m. 2019)

Ari Boyland (born 10 August 1987) is a New Zealand film, television and stage actor. As a child, he had a breakout role in the New Zealand cult hit science fiction drama series, The Tribe (1999 - 2003). He also played the role of Brodie Kemp in Shortland Street (2010 - 2011). He currently stars in the TVNZ drama, Testify (2024–present).

== Early life ==
Boyland was born in Lower Hutt, New Zealand. He is Jewish.

He had a breakout role as KC in the science fiction drama series, The Tribe. He was a cast member in Series 1–3, along with a brief appearance in Series 5, and whose character became somewhat of a protégé of Lex (Caleb Ross). Boyland also starred in The Tribe music video and album Abe Messiah and the documentary The Making of The Tribe in 1999 as well as the 2001 British documentary A Date With the Tribe.

While attending the New Zealand Children's Academy, he also had small roles in Cloud 9's Revelations - The Initial Journey and the Disney Channel Original Movie You Wish! as well as many theatrical and musical productions across New Zealand.

== Career ==
In August 2008, Boyland starred in the White Trash Omnibus, a play written and directed by Auckland University graduate Patrick Graham, with Kate Rylatt and Mike Ginn at the Maidment Theatre in Auckland, New Zealand. He also appeared in the South Pacific Pictures television series Go Girls, based on another play written by Patrick Graham. In 2009, he played the character of Flynn McAllistair in the children's television series Power Rangers RPM.

In 2021, he was announced as a cast member of the CBBC family-adventure series Mystic. In 2022, he appeared in three episodes of the TVNZ sitcom Kid Sister, playing Rabbi Rob.

In 2022, he began appearing as a Rabbi in a recurring role in the TVNZ sitcom Kid Sister, about a Jewish family in Auckland. He returned for the second season in 2023.

He later starred in the TVNZ drama, Testify (2024), as Paul, the prodigal son of a wealthy and influential evangelical family in Auckland.

== Personal life ==
Boyland lives in Sydney, Australia, having previously lived and worked in Los Angeles. His father lives in Brisbane. In September 2019, Boyland announced his marriage to actress Tara Spadaro.

== Filmography ==
=== Television ===
Year	Title	Role	Notes
1999 – 2003	The Tribe	KC	
2009	Power Rangers RPM	Flynn McAllistair/Ranger Operator Series Blue	
2010 – 2011	Shortland Street	Brodie Kemp	
2010	Go Girls	Scott Smart	
2011	Power Rangers Samurai	Vulpes	Voice role
2015	Bus Driver	Yuppie	
2021	The Unusual Suspects	Dean	
2021	Mystic	Alex Zarkoff	Recurring role, season 2
2022 – present	Kid Sister	Rabbi Rob	Recurring role, seasons 1–2
2024 – present	Testify	Paul Jacobson	Series regular

=== Film ===
Year	Title	Role	Notes
2003	You Wish!	James Cooper	
2013	Blood Punch	Russell	
2015	Joker's Wild	William Remmington	
2015	Mesmerized	Alan Hawthrone	
2021	Poppy	Dave Simpson	

== Awards ==
At the 2014 Hoboken International Film Festival, Boyland received a Best Supporting Actor nomination for his work on Blood Punch.
