= Meryl Cassie =

New Zealand actress and singer

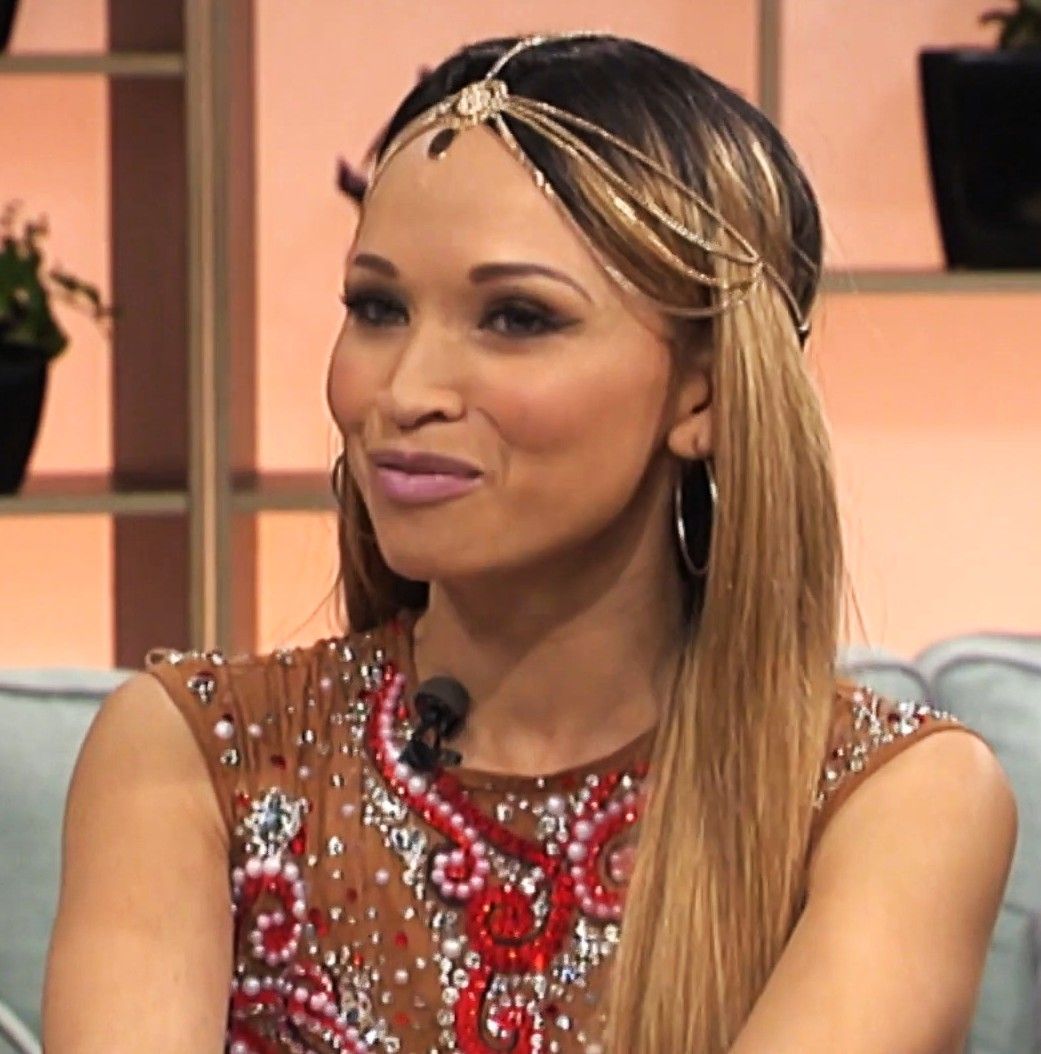
- Cassie in 2018
- Born: Meryl Danielle Cassie; 2 April 1984 (age 42); George, Cape Province, South Africa
- Occupations: Actress, singer
- Years active: 1999–present

Meryl Danielle Cassie (born 2 April 1984) is a New Zealand actress and singer. She has three children, a son, Rylon born in 2006 and two daughters Breeze (Born 18 October 2013) and Diaz (born 2015). She is most famous for her role as Ebony in the sci-fi series The Tribe, but has also appeared in other series, such as Revelations - The Initial Journey, Shortland Street and Hercules.

She is also a talented singer, and sang the theme song of The Tribe from season 2 to 5, including being the lead singer on Abe Messiah, an album inspired from The Tribe. Along with her sisters Megan Alatini and Monique Cassie, she formed a band called the Nubian Angels in her early teens. The band relaunched in 2007, and have made various performances for charity in co-operation with Variety, the Children's Charity, including joining them on the 2008 Variety Bash tour, and at other charity and social events.

Cassie moved from New Zealand to Bondi Beach, Australia in 2008. She auditioned for Australian Idol but was not selected.

== Career ==
Cassie wanted to become an actress ever since she was five years old. She has trained in drama at the Young People's Theatre and Nathan Homestead. Because she wanted to get into acting as soon as possible, she got an agent at the age of 9, as she saw this as the first and best option to achieve her goal. Cassie got her first acting job in the New Zealand kids show What Now at the age of 11, where she starred as a field presenter.

In 1998, Cassie auditioned for the show that would give her both success and acting experience: The Tribe. She auditioned for the role of the character Salene, but the producers called her and told her she had received the role of Ebony, one of the antagonistic characters on the show.

Official filming of the first season commenced in August 1998, and lasted for six months to March 1999. The fifth and last season wrapped up principal photography on 1 March 2003.

In the period of 2004 to 2007, Cassie went on a hiatus, and took a break from acting and singing. She worked in a bank, helped out at her mother's hair braiding salon and gave birth to her first child, Rylon Ngarino Watt, on 16 September 2006.

In 2004, she auditioned for New Zealand Idol. She did not make it past the second round, partly because the judges thought she had too much experience to be in the contest. Various reports have stated that Cassie was very sad and actually cried on camera, saying how mean the judges were. Cassie's brother, Miguel Cassie, was going to make a TV documentary about Idol, where the rejected contestants could have a new chance. This show never saw the light of day.

In 2006 Cassie provided music for New Zealand teen series Karaoke High. Though she didn't appear on the show, she provided her singing talent for the character Miri (played by Alina Transom).

In 2008 Cassie appeared in the music video for P-Money's "Everything", where she was dancing on the shoulders of the lead female in the music video. She also sang an impromptu performance of the Kelly Clarkson track "A Moment Like This" at a reunion of members of The Tribe cast, which was held on 13 September 2008. She ended the year performing on stage at the Coca-Cola Christmas in the Park 2008, where she sang "What Time Is It?" with fellow New Zealand entertainers Drew Neemia, Catherine Campion, Anthony Utama, Cameron Douglas and Jodie Clarke.

Following on from her appearance in P-Money's music video for "Everything" in 2008, Cassie became the lead in his music video "Angels", where she plays the girlfriend of P-Money's who is being haunted by supernatural beings. January 2010 saw Cassie appear in Legend of the Seeker, in the season 2 episode "Resurrection" where she played a courtesan named Bella.

As well performing in several gigs in Auckland, Cassie also featured on the P-Money album Everything, doing vocals on the track Dance With You. The track also features PNC, Vince Harder and Mz J. Cassie joined them and P-Money in the music video for the track, it marked her third appearance in a P-Money music video.

In August 2010 Cassie has an appearance on New Zealand comedy series The Jono Project where she will be in a parody/homage to the international hit show Glee (TV Series).

In 2013, Cassie successfully auditioned for The X Factor, progressing to the boot camp round, but failed to make it through the following round.

As of 2017 Cassie is now touring as the ring mistress of the Weber Bros Circus show Adrenaline throughout New Zealand.
