= The Legend of William Tell =

Television fantasy/drama series produced in 1998

- Created by: Raymond Thompson
- Starring: Kieren Hutchison; Andrew Binns; Nathaniel Lees; Katrina Browne
- Country of origin: New Zealand
- No. of seasons: 1
- No. of episodes: 16

Production
- Executive producer: Raymond Thompson
- Producer: Lesley Jones
- Cinematography: Renaud Maire

Original release
- Release: 30 August – 20 December 1998

The Legend of William Tell is a 16-part television fantasy/drama series produced in 1998 by Cloud 9 Productions in New Zealand. The basic premise of the series — a crossbow-wielding rebel defies a corrupt governor — and the name of the title character were adopted from the traditional story, but the series was set in a fantasy world and featured supernatural themes.

Described by executive producer Raymond Thompson as "Star Wars on the planet Earth", this is a fantasy saga of bravery, magic, myth, and romance. William Tell is the youthful leader of a band of young, ‘brat pack' outlaws, forever hunted by the forces of darkness, led by Xax and Kreel, who have usurped power in their homeland. The series of self-contained stories follows Will's quest to restore young Princess Vara to her rightful place on the royal throne and defeat Xax and Kreel's forces — and by doing so, bring back peace and order to the Kingdom of Kale.

There is action and adventure along the way, magic, creatures, mystery, intrigue — but also much human drama and interplay among Will's rebel band who must support each other in their quest. The group encounter a diverse range of people and situations on their journey — some help the resistance movement, others are cohorts of Xax and Kreel.

Filmed on location throughout New Zealand, the series makes use of natural scenery and has high production values.

The Legend of William Tell also aired on Sri Lanka National Television with Sinhalese voicing and on Vietnam Television (18:00 VTV3) with Vietnamese voicing. It also aired in Greece, with greek subtitles on "Star Channel".

== Cast ==
- Kieren Hutchison as William Tell
- Andrew Binns as Xax
- Nathaniel Lees as Leon
- Katrina Browne as Aruna
- Ray Henwood as Kreel
- Sharon Tyrell as Kalem
- Beth Allen as Princess Vara
- Drew Ne'emia as Drogo
- Ken Blackburn as Commissioner Esdras

== Episodes ==
=== Season 1 (1998–1999) ===
#	Title	Summary
1	Shaytana's Eye	With the help of Kreel's dark magic, Xax ousts Princess Vara from her throne and assumes power. Now the sorceress Kalem must bring together an unlikely band of freedom fighters to battle Xax and Kreel's evil.
2	The Fifth Column	Xax's Warriors have been pillaging the countryside and William's crossbow has been broken. A master craftsman is needed to fix it, but there's a traitor in the group.
3	Escape into Fear	Xax has put a price on William's head and William must surrender himself to save a village's people. Can William's friends save him before the "mock-trial"'s sentence of death is carried out?
4	Darkness and Light	William's comrade Leon is captured and used as bait, but William's plan to free him by using a weapon of Darkness may prove his own destruction.
5	Hidden Valley	Kreel drugs the children of the various regions and villages into becoming a spy network, and Will's obsession with bitter memories of his parents' death at Xax's hands may not only disrupt his quest for The Crystal Arrow but also bring Xax's forces down upon his band.
6	The Challenge	Both William and Xax have fallen in love with the same girl, but soon William must face an almost unbearable choice: either let the girl's true love die or lose her forever.
7	The Spirit of Kale	Kalem transforms herself into a bird to spy on Kreel, but is discovered and wounded badly. Now William and Aruna must go on a dangerous journey to bring back the magical cure.
8	Swarm	When Princess Vara falls due to a sickness, the band is taken in by the healer Harana. However, Haruina's group The Watchers is being secretly corrupted by Kreel, and when Aruna and Leon become victims William must face Kreel himself to free them.
9	The Sorcerer's Apprentice	A horrible threat hangs over the Kingdom but for once it does not issue from Xax and Kreel, and William and Xax are forced to work together to defeat an evil sorcerer's plan to release a deadly virus.
10	Master of Doubt	While out hunting, Xax runs right into William and his band and chases them into a dark and forbidding castle where nothing is what it seems. When Drogo and Vara fall into danger, Will must somehow work out how to escape the Castle in order to save them.
11	The Lotus Eaters	Fleeing from Xaxian Warriors, Will and the others stumble into a place which seems to magically grant their every desire. But one must be careful what one wishes for, for the wish may be granted, and there is a terrible price to be paid ...
12	The Tomb of the Unknown Warrior	Two tribes, the Sarks and the Mendicans, have been remote enough to escape the attentions of Xax and Kreel, but Will is concerned that the two tribes are too involved with fighting each other to understand or appreciate the threat from Xax and must find a way to make them put aside their differences and form a united front against Xax.
13	The Labyrinth	In an attempt to defeat Will and Kalem, Kreel has brought forth the most concentrated evil in the form of the Memlok, a creature of the Dark, and traps Will and Aruna in the Labyrinth, another creation of Kreel's. However, evil cannot always be contained or controlled, and the Memlok turns on Kreel himself.
14	Doppelganger	Kreel creates evil mirror-images of Will in order to make all Kale turn against the rebel heroes. The battle to destroy the doppelgangers will prove more costly than anyone realizes.
15	Combat	With Kalem seemingly destroyed, an impatient Aruna leaves Will's band but is captured by Xax and seduced into becoming his Warrior Queen. Now William must face his former comrade in a duel to the death.
16	Resurrection	In the aftermath of Combat, the companions lose heart and scatter. However, William is given a final chance to redeem himself, reunite his friends, defeat Xax and Kreel and restore Princess Vara to the throne.
