= Michael Wesley-Smith =

New Zealand actor

- Born: Michael Thomas Hickland Wesley-Smith; 2 December 1983 (age 42); New Zealand
- Years active: 1998 - present
- Notable credit(s): Jack in The Tribe; Giles Gordon in Atlantis High

Michael Thomas Hickland Wesley-Smith (born 2 December 1983) is a New Zealand television actor. He is best known for his portrayal of Jack in the teen sci-fi TV show The Tribe.

== Biography ==
Wesley-Smith started his career acting on stage in productions such as Charlie and the Chocolate Factory or Hercules and starring in info-videos. In 1997, he landed a guest role on the TV series The Legend of William Tell. The production company of the show, Cloud 9, then asked him to audition for their new series, The Tribe. He won the part of Jack, and played him in all five seasons from 1999 to 2003. Throughout filming, he also occupied the lead role of the wacky teen comedy Atlantis High as Giles Gordon, and had to take several absences from The Tribe. His character Jack was therefore absent during long portions of the third and fourth seasons of the show. He also played the guest part of Craig in an episode of The Strip in 2002.

Wesley-Smith completed a degree in Law at Otago University and went on to study journalism at New Zealand Broadcasting School in Christchurch.

He now works as a reporter on Newshub's The Nation.

== Filmography ==
- The Last Great Snail Chase (2007)

=== TV work ===
- The Strip
  - "Get Over It" (2002) .... Craig
- Atlantis High (2001) .... Giles Gordon
- The Tribe .... Jack (1999–2003, Seasons 1-5)
- The Legend of William Tell
  - "The Challenge" (1998) .... Flynn
