= Caleb Ross =

New Zealand actor (born 1981)

- Born: 10 December 1981 (age 44); Whangārei, New Zealand
- Occupations: Film and television actorsinger song writer.
- Years active: 1994–present

Caleb Ross (born 10 December 1981) is a New Zealand film and television actor best known for his role as Lex in the cult science fiction television series The Tribe. In 1998, he played Logan Patterson on Shortland Street. Throughout the years, he has appeared in Xena: Warrior Princess, Hercules: The Legendary Journeys, Mercy Peak and Revelations – The Initial Journey.

== Biography ==
Ross was one of eight children born in Whangārei, New Zealand. He became interested in acting after watching Les Misérables and, at the age of 9, he began performing in musical theatre in his hometown. As part of the Whangarei Amateur Opera and Dramatics Society, he participated in stage productions of Godspell, Jesus Christ Superstar, Evita and Peter Pan. His father helped him get an agent shortly afterward and he made his acting debut, in an uncredited role, in the 1994 short film Avondale Dogs. He also appeared in a commercial for McDonald's. He soon appeared in minor roles on Hercules: The Legendary Journeys, Xena: Warrior Princess, Plainclothes and Shortland Street. At age 14, his first screen kiss was on that show.

In 1999, he was cast in perhaps his best-known role as Lex on the science fiction teen drama The Tribe. One of the main antagonists during the first series, his character eventually became part of his adopted tribe the Mall Rats although remained an anti-hero throughout the show's run. He was one of the few original cast members to appear in all five seasons, as well as being the only one in every episode (except two), and sang the lead vocals on the spin-off album Abe Messiah. He was regarded as one of the main characters and was a trendy character; he is regarded as the one who made the show very popular. He made numerous promotional appearances for the show in New Zealand and the United Kingdom which, in March 2001, included being interviewed on the early morning talk show The Big Breakfast.

Following the show's cancellation, he guest starred on Mercy Peak and Revelations. He and Vanessa Stacey (Alice) were both involved in behind-the-scenes work for The Tribe follow up series The New Tomorrow, with Ross becoming a foley artist for the series, and was a unit assistant in the 2004 film Futile Attraction. In September 2006, Ross made an appearance at the 2006 Dragon*Con convention in Atlanta, Georgia, with Tribe co-stars Tom Hern (Ram) and Matt Robinson (Slade). In 2002, he appeared in The Lord of the Rings: The Two Towers as a Rohan Soldier in the Battle of Helms Deep. He went uncredited in his role.

In recent years, Ross has been in the process of publishing his autobiography. He has also been involved in several television and short film projects including a cameo appearance with another former Tribe cast member Michael Wesley-Smith (Jack) in the 2007 film The Last Great Snail Chase. He had also indicated in interviews an interest in immigrating to Canada to continue his acting career.

In 2011, Caleb appeared in the Documentary ‘The Last Dogs of Winter’, which was directed by Costa Botes and went on to win an award at Toronto International Film Festival. Following this, he worked as a camera operator for ‘12 Dogs Drive-The Run Home’ (2018) and the TV Series, ‘Polar Bear Town’. Now retired from acting, he founded Nanuk Operations, a guiding expedition company and rents out camera equipment to productions across Canada.

== Filmography ==
| Year | Title | Character | Notes |
|---|---|---|---|
| 1994 | Avondale Dogs | Brett | (Uncredited) |
| 1995 | Plainclothes | Neglected Boy | 1 episode |
| 1997 | Hercules: The Legendary Journeys | Nico | 1 episode |
| 1998 | Shortland Street | Logan Patterson | Unknown episodes |
| 1998 | Xena: Warrior Princess | Temecula | 1 episode |
| 1999-2003 | The Tribe (1999 TV series) | Lex | 260 episodes |
| 2002 | The Lord of the Rings: The Two Towers | Rohan Warrior | Battle of Helm’s Deep (uncredited) |
| 2003 | Revelations – The Initial Journey | Samuel | 1 episode |
| 2003-2004 | Mercy Peak | Brett Duval | 2 episodes |
| 2007 | The Last Great Snail Chase | Rob | |
| 2011 | The Last Dogs of Winter | Self | Canadian Documentary |

== Awards ==
| Year | Title | Film Festival | Award | Status |
|---|---|---|---|---|
| 2011 | The Last Dogs of Winter | Toronto International Film Festival | Best Canadian Documentary | Winner-Shared with Costa Boates |
| 2012 | The Last Dogs of Winter | Sydney Film Festival | Best Documentary | Nominated-Shared with Costa Boates |
| 2012 | The Last Dogs of Winter | International Documentary Film Festival Amsterdam | Best Documentary | Nominated-Shared with Costa Boates |
