= List of people from the Northland Region =

The following is a list of famous people born in Northland, New Zealand, and people who spent significant periods of their lives living in the Northland region.

== Media ==
- Laurence Clark, cartoonist

== Political ==
- Ria Bond, politician (New Zealand First)
- Te Paea Cherrington, tribal leader
- Hōne Heke, chief and war leader
- Hongi Hika, chief and war leader
- Jack Marshall, former Prime Minister
- Matt McCarten, political organiser
- Winston Peters, politician, deputy Prime Minister (New Zealand First)
- Kelvin Davis (politician), Deputy Leader of the Labour Party.
- Rawiri Taiwhanga, tribal leader
- John Carter politician (National Party).
- Te Ruki Kawiti, chief and war leader.
- Jim Belich, retired politician
- Te Paea Cherrington, Nga Puhi tribal leader
- Gordon Coates, 21st prime minister of New Zealand
- Thomas Forsaith politician

== Art ==
- Robyn Donald author of romance novels
- Friedensreich Hundertwasser, Austrian-born visual artist and architect

== Entertainment ==
- Billy T. James, comedian
- Maewa Kaihau, composer
- Anika Moa, musician
- Rena Owen, actress
- Rawiri Paratene, actor
- Keith Urban, singer

== Military ==
- Willie Apiata, Victoria Cross recipient
- Fred Baker, soldier
- James Hēnare
- Lloyd Trigg
- Richard Trousdale
- Lawrence Weathers
- Clifton Webb

== Sports ==
- Con Barrell
- Bryce Beeston
- Selwyn Blackmore
- Adam Blair, rugby league
- Noel Bowden
- Richard Brazendale
- Laurie Byers
- Randall Carrington
- Ellis Child
- Murray Child
- Jeremy Christie
- Barry Cooper, cricket
- Catherine Cox
- Bob Cunis
- Mike Davidson
- Eric Dunn
- Samuel Ellis, cricket
- Abby Erceg, football
- Ken Going, rugby union
- Sid Going, rugby union
- Billy Guyton, rugby union
- David Holwell, rugby union
- Ian Jones, rugby union
- Suzie Muirhead, field hockey
- Rene Ranger, rugby union
- Tim Southee, cricket
- Blair Tuke, sailor

== Business ==
- Michael Hill, jeweller
- Ngāwini Yates, storekeeper, farmer and businesswoman
- Joseph Dargaville, founder of Northland town Dargaville
- Clare Athfield, retired interior designer

== Academics ==
- Mick Brown, judge
- Annabella Mary Geddes, welfare worker and community leader
- 'Tākou' Himiona Tūpākihi Kāmira, Māori tohunga, historian and genealogist
- Māori Marsden, author, minister and expert in Maori philosophy
- Terryann Clark Maori nursing academic

== Others ==
- John Samuel Edmonds, one of the first settlers who emigrated with his family from Dorset, England after New Zealand was established.
- Noel Hilliam, dairy farmer, shipwreck hunter, and amateur historian.
- Piipi Raumati Cummins tribal leader, business person and activist
