= Statue of Dame Whina Cooper =

Statue in Panguru, New Zealand

Statue of Whina Cooper
- Artist: Jimi Hills
- Year: 2020
- Type: bronze
- Location: Panguru, New Zealand

The Statue of Whina Cooper is located in Panguru, New Zealand, and honours the life of Whina Cooper, a Māori leader and land rights activist.

The statue was commissioned by the New Zealand Government and was created by Jimi Hills, of Ngāti Porou, Tūhoe and Te Whānau a Upokorehe. It is based on a well-known photograph by Michael Tubberty showing Whina holding the hand of her three-year-old granddaughter as the pair left the settlement of Te Hāpua at the start of the 1100-kilometre 1975 Māori land march.

The statue is located in front of Waipuna Marae in the small north Hokianga settlement of Panguru. It was unveiled on 2 February 2020 by Whina's son Joe Cooper and Prime Minister Jacinda Ardern.
