= Whina (film) =

2022 New Zealand film

- Directed by: James Napier Robertson; Paula Whetu Jones
- Written by: James Lucas; James Napier Robertson; Paula Whetu Jones
- Produced by: Matthew Metcalfe; Tainui Stephens
- Starring: Miriama McDowell; Rena Owen; Tioreore Ngatai-Melbourne
- Cinematography: Leon Narbey
- Edited by: John Gilbert; Chris Plummer
- Production companies: General Film Corporation; Ingenious Media; Rakija Films
- Distributed by: Transmission Films
- Release date: 23 June 2022
- Running time: 112 minutes
- Country: New Zealand
- Languages: English, Māori

Whina is a New Zealand biographical film about the life of Whina Cooper. Directed by James Napier Robertson and Paula Whetu Jones, and written by Robertson, Jones and James Lucas, the film stars Rena Owen, Miriama McDowell and Tioreore Ngatai-Melbourne as Cooper in different stages of her life.

== Plot summary ==
The film chronicles the life of Whina Cooper as a Māori leader, wife and mother. These are interspersed with flashbacks of her leadership of the 1975 Māori Land March. The film begins with Whina and her family being embroiled in a land dispute with a Pākehā (New Zealand European) farmer named Bob Holland in their hometown of Panguru. Though Whina is arrested by the Police, a sympathetic Catholic priest named Father Mulder secures her release by pointing out that her father Heremia Te Wake built the church that he worships at.

During the 1930s, Whina and her first husband Richard Gilbert participates in a government land scheme aimed at Māori with encouragement of Māori Member of Parliament Āpirana Ngata, who encourages Māori to preserve their culture while learning European knowledge and skills. Through hardwork and sound investments, Whina and Richard are able to develop their farm into a successful business. Whina clashes with the leadership of her Te Rarawa iwi (tribe), who do not tolerate her outspokenness and defiance of traditional taboo against women speaking in marae (meeting houses). While raising their two children, Whina tends to her ill husband Richard, who suffers from a cancerous disease.

Later, the New Zealand Government orders an audit of Māori land. Due to their hard work and investments, Whina manages to secure a favourable report from the Native land consolidation officer William Cooper. Despite initially keeping a distance, Whina develops romantic feelings for William and the two have an affair. After Richard dies from cancer, Whina learns that she is pregnant with William's child. As a result, the two are forced to migrate to Otiria where they marry and start a new life. Whina's blended family expands to include William's children.

During the Second World War, Whina takes part in a tapu (taboo) lifting ceremony in Waitangi and becomes involved in the Māori War Effort Organisation, which raises funds for the war effort through hāngī and auctions. Whina later returns to Panguru and reconciles with her estranged relatives. Whina and William build a new meeting hall where women are allowed to speak. However, her relationship with Father Mulder is strained when he denounces the traditional Māori wood carvings as idols. After the meeting hall is burnt, William dies from a heart attack.

In 1949, Whina and her family migrate to Grey Lynn where they and other Māori migrants experience discrimination in obtaining housing and work. In response, Whina joins the Māori Women's Welfare League, which seeks to combat homelessness, unemployment and alcoholism within the Māori community. Under her leadership, the League embarks on an ambitious programme to improve Māori education and outcomes, and to lobby the Government through petitions and statistics. Despite the League's success in improving Māori well being, Whina is later forced to resign as President after other League leaders object to her not attending meetings and making decisions without consulting them. While living in Auckland, Whina also meets an apologetic Father Mulder, who concedes that Māori church attendance has declined since the churches are not meeting their needs.

In 1975, Whina organises the Māori Land March with the goal of reclaiming confiscated Māori land and forcing the Government to honour the Treaty of Waitangi. She emphasises that the Land March is peaceful and takes a zero tolerance approach to alcoholism among marchers. The marchers march from Te Hāpua at the top of the North Island down to the New Zealand Parliament in Wellington. During the March, Whina overcomes her self doubt, ageing health, and some hostile opposition with the help of the younger marchers including her nephew Gabriel. The film concludes with archival footage of Whina presenting a petition and a memorial of rights to politicians at Parliament.

== Cast and characters ==
- Rena Owen as Older Whina Cooper
- James Rolleston as Gabriel, nephew of Whina
- Vinnie Bennett as William Cooper
- Miriama McDowell as Younger Whina Cooper
- Erroll Shand as Father Mulder
- Tioreore Ngatai-Melbourne as Teenage Whina Cooper
- Sarah Valentine as Elaine
- Jayden Daniels as Cyril
- Briar Rose as Stacey
- Kali Kopae as Mira Szászy
- Awa Puna as Pattie
- Richard Te Are as Richard Gilbert
- Marshayla Christie as Kare
- Wayne Hapi as Heremia Te Wake
- James Tito as Pita Te Wake

== Production ==
Whina was written by James Lucas, James Napier Robertson and Paula Whetu Jones, and directed by Robertson and Jones.

Initial production on the film began in the early 2010s.

Initially, the film had a planned shooting schedule of only one month. However, delays due to the COVID-19 lockdowns in New Zealand meant shooting took almost six months.

== Release ==
The film debuted on 23 June 2022 in cinemas across New Zealand on the eve of the first time Matariki was recognised as a public holiday. Film stars attended a special charity screening of the film in Kerikeri on the same day. Cooper's granddaughter Irene attended the charity screening alongside cast-members.

Whina screened at the Sydney Film Festival in June 2022; Edinburgh Film Festival in August 2022; and the Adelaide Film Festival (AFF) on 23 October 2022. It was one of 12 titles selected in competition at AFF.

The film was released in Australian cinemas on 3 November 2022.

== Box office ==
Whina was the fifth-best performing film in New Zealand during its week of release, and is as of October 2022 the second highest performing film of New Zealand origin at the New Zealand Box Office for 2022.

== Reception ==
The film received positive reviews. It holds a 100% on Rotten Tomatoes based on 9 critic reviews.
