= Whina Cooper =

New Zealand Māori leader (1895–1994)

Dame Whina Cooper ONZ DBE
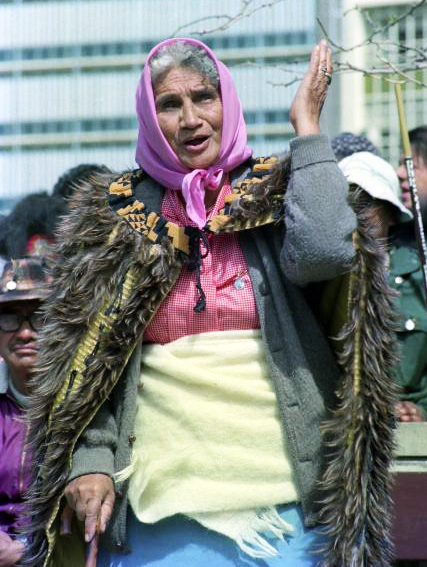
- Whina Cooper addressing the Māori land march at Hamilton in 1975

1st President of the Māori Women's Welfare League
- In office 1951–1957
- Succeeded by: Mīria Logan

Personal details
- Born: Hōhepine Te Wake; 9 December 1895 Te Karaka, Hokianga, New Zealand
- Died: 26 March 1994 (aged 98) Panguru, New Zealand
- Spouses: Richard Gilbert (m. 1917; died 1935) William Cooper (m. 1941; died 1949)
- Children: 7
- Occupation: Activist, historian, schoolteacher

Dame Whina Cooper ONZ DBE (born Hōhepine Te Wake; 9 December 1895 – 26 March 1994) was a New Zealand kuia (Māori elder), who worked for many years for the rights of Māori, and particularly to improve the lot of Māori women. She is remembered for leading the 1975 Māori land march from Te Hāpua to Wellington, a distance of 1,100 km (680 mi), at the age of 79.

Her wide influence and nationally recognised activity led her to be acknowledged with awards in both the British and New Zealand Royal Honours Systems, and by her own people, who bestowed the title Te Whaea o te Motu ('Mother of the Nation') upon her. She is the subject of the 2022 film Whina.

== Early life ==
Whina Cooper was born Hōhepine Te Wake, daughter of community leader and Catholic catechist Heremia Te Wake and Kare Pauro Kawatihi, of the Te Rarawa iwi, at Te Karaka, Hokianga.

From an early age, she showed an interest in her father's role, and in history and genealogy. Her education began at Whakarapa Native School. In 1907, she attended St Joseph's Māori Girls' College. After high school, she returned to Whakarapa (later Panguru) where her father wanted her to enter into an arranged marriage with Tureiti Te Heuheu Tukino V, leader of Ngāti Tūwharetoa. Cooper refused, and instead worked at a local co-operative store. She worked as a teacher for a brief time, at Pawarenga Native School. However, as one of only three teachers, she became frustrated, and found her time stretched between teaching and helping her own community. She left teaching in 1914 and was a housekeeper at the Catholic presbytery of Rawene for two years. She kept her Catholic faith her whole life.

== Political activism ==
=== 1914–1935: Whakarapa ===
Cooper's first involvement in politics was in the form of a land dispute over an area of leased mudflats in around 1914. The farmer who rented the land, Bob Holland, wanted to drain the estuary for farming. This would have obstructed current use of the land by local iwi for gathering seafood and for racing horses during the drier months. Heremia challenged the lease in court, and Cooper led a group of protesters to fill in Holland's drains even though Bob Holland legally leased the land. The protesters were eventually charged with trespassing, but they had stalled events long enough for Heremia to be successful, and the Marine Department withdrew the lease.

In 1916, she returned to work at the co-operative store, and around this time, met her first husband, Richard Gilbert, of Ngāti Wai. She married him on 10 May 1917, with only her parents' knowledge, which led to some unhappiness with her wider family and community, who felt they should have been consulted. After her parents died, the couple left the family home and moved to family land at Te Karaka, where they had to build their own home. By 1920 they had two children, and were able to borrow money from a local priest to purchase her father's home and farm at Whakarapa and the local store. There she played a leading role in business and the community, including in 1923 calling a hui that led to the name of Whakarapa being changed to Panguru. Her community leadership impressed politician Sir Āpirana Ngata, who invited her to a national hui in 1932. She worked alongside him to promote Māori land-development programmes in the Hokianga. Through him, she also met William Cooper of Ngāti Kahungunu, who became her second husband after Richard Gilbert died of cancer in 1935.

=== 1949–1960s: Auckland ===
She moved to Auckland in 1949 when her second husband, William Cooper, died. Her political activity changed from local to national. In September 1951, she was elected first president of the new Māori Women's Welfare League "which was able to improve things notably for Maori women", working on health, housing, education, and welfare.

In 1957, she stepped down as president, and the annual conference rewarded her with the title Te Whaea o te Motu ("Mother of the Nation"). During the 1960s, she worked on a local level around Auckland, but kept largely out of the national spotlight.

=== 1975: Land March ===
In 1975, a coalition of Māori groups asked Cooper to lead them in a protest against the loss of Māori land. She agreed, proposing a hīkoi (symbolic march) from the northern tip of the North Island to Parliament in Wellington, at the other end of the island.

During September and October 1975, the nearly 80-year-old Cooper again became nationally recognised, walking at the head of the Māori land march from Te Hāpua to Wellington, a distance of 1,100 kilometres (680 mi). The slogan of the march was "not one more acre of Maori land"; they demanded acknowledgement of property rights under the Treaty of Waitangi.

== Honours and awards ==
- In the 1953 Coronation Honours, Cooper was appointed a Member of the Order of the British Empire, for services to the Māori people.
- In the 1974 Queen's Birthday Honours, she was promoted to Commander of the Order of the British Empire, for services to Māori welfare and culture.
- In the 1981 New Year Honours, Cooper was further promoted to Dame Commander of the Order of the British Empire, for services to the Māori people.
- In 1990, Cooper received the New Zealand 1990 Commemoration Medal.
- In the 1991 Queen's Birthday Honours, she became the twentieth appointee to the Order of New Zealand, New Zealand's highest civil honour.
- In 1993 she was awarded the New Zealand Suffrage Centennial Medal.

== Death and legacy ==
Cooper returned to Panguru in the Hokianga in 1983 and died there, aged 98, in 1994. An estimated 30,000 people attended Cooper's tangi which lasted several days. Cooper's passing generated tributes from numerous political figures including Queen Elizabeth II, Prince Philip and Jim Bolger.

Her legacy includes calling the 1923 hui that led to the name of Whakarapa being changed to Panguru.

She is remembered as a leader who helped to shape New Zealand legislation relating to Māori people, as well as helping to develop the community in Auckland. However she is most remembered for winning over the hearts of so many people when she led the 1975 land march, in both Māori and Pākehā communities.

She has also served as an inspiration to other Māori women, such as Tiahuia Abraham, who as of 2022 has been a member of the Māori Women's Welfare League for 53 years.

=== Memorials ===
On 3 February 2020, a memorial at the Waipuna Marae was unveiled in Panguru, Hokianga, in the presence of prime minister Jacinda Ardern. The bronze statue was a sculptural representation of a photograph of Cooper, holding the hand of her granddaughter, as they were starting the 1975 land march. Ardern promised that her story would be included in the new school history curriculum.

=== Honorific eponym ===
In 2020, the tunnel boring machine that is being used to construct the twin tunnels of the City Rail Link in Auckland between Mount Eden station and Aotea station was named "Dame Whina Cooper".

=== Film ===
Cooper is the subject of a biographical film called Whina, which was released in selected cinemas on 23 June 2022. The film was directed by James Napier Robertson and Paula Whetu Jones. Cooper was portrayed by Miriama McDowell and Rena Owen, with the former portraying an adult, and the latter an elderly, Cooper.

=== Television ===
Whina Cooper was the focus of the documentary, Whina, Te Whaea O Te Moto – Mother of the Nation (1992) by Bryan Bruce. Bruce also featured footage of the Whina Cooper-led Maori land march of 1975 in The Bridge (2002), a television documentary about the history of the Auckland Harbour Bridge.

=== Music ===
Composer Robert Wiremu's work Te Kai a Te Rangatira set to music speeches by several Māori leaders including Cooper. Written for baritone and chamber ensemble it was commissioned for the IO Festival Kaitaia. Cooper's speech entitled Whina said... was arranged for vocal ensemble and performed by the King's Singers on their 2026 tour of New Zealand.

== See also ==
- Treaty of Waitangi Act 1975
