= Te Paea =

Te Paea can refer to:

- Te Paea o Hauraki Marae, a tribal meeting ground at Kennedy Bay for Ngāti Tamaterā
- Sophia Hinerangi (c. 1834–1911), a Māori tourist guide and temperance leader
- Te Paea Cherrington (c. 1878–1937) a New Zealand tribal leader of Māori descent
- Te Paea Paringatai, New Zealand librarian
- Te Paea Selby-Rickit (born 1992), New Zealand netballer
- Te Paea Tīaho (c. 1820–1875), New Zealand Māori woman of mana
