= Testify (TV series) =

New Zealand television series

- Genre: Drama
- Written by: Paula Whetu Jones; Gavin Strawhan
- Directed by: Paula Whetu Jones; David Stubbs
- Starring: Vinnie Bennett; Ari Boyland; Stacey Hayes; Craig Hall
- Composer: Karl Sölve Steven
- Country of origin: New Zealand
- Original language: English
- No. of series: 1
- No. of episodes: 6

Production
- Executive producer: Philippa Rennie
- Producers: Sharlene George; Suze Hannagan
- Cinematography: Simon Tutty
- Running time: 45 mins
- Production company: Warner Bros. International Television Production

Original release
- Network: TVNZ 2 (2024–present)
- Release: 8 April – 23 April 2024

Testify is a 2024 New Zealand drama series broadcast on TVNZ 2. It centres on a wealthy and influential family at the helm of an evangelical megachurch in Auckland. The television series premiered on TVNZ 2 and TVNZ+ on 8 April 2024.

== Synopsis ==
A youth pastor, David challenges his father, Scott to make their evangelical megachurch more socially inclusive. David teams up with his brother, Paul, the prodigal son and Dana, a queer podcaster. Together, they uncover historic sexual abuse in the church.

== Cast ==
- Vinnie Bennett as David Jacobson, youth pastor and adopted son of Scott
- Craig Hall as Scott Jacobson, Pastor of Avow Church and family patriarch
- Ari Boyland as Paul Jacobson, estranged adopted son of Scott and David's half-brother
- Kat Browne as Jen Jacobson, Scott's wife
- Jessica Grace Smith as Emmaline Jacobson, daughter of Scott
- Paipera Hayes as Dana, podcaster
- Holly Prestorius as Eden, Dana's flatmate and podcast partner
- Molly Curnow as Isla, Dana's flatmate and church attendee
- Matthew Lee as Leon Cheng, Avow Church dancer
- Kael Munro-Nonoa as Mux, troubled 13 year old youth whom the Jacobsons become guardians.

== Episodes ==
No.	Title	Directed by	Written by	Original release date	New Zealand viewers (millions)
1	"Episode 1"	Unknown	Unknown	8 April 2024	N/A
Youth pastor David Jacobson is a rising star at his father Pastor Scott Jacobson's evangelical mega church Avow. While rescuing a troubled church member named Leon from a drug overdose at a night club, David crosses paths with queer podcasters Dana, Eden and Isla. Dana and her queer friends attend a church service while doing research for a podcast on Pastor Scott and Avow church. Eden, who uses a wheelchair, mocks Pastor Scott's belief in faith healing. While Scott is socially conservative, David is less antagonistic towards the LGBT community. Later, Jacobson David's estranged half brother Paul also returns to Auckland after spending 14 years away in Sydney. He tracks down a Henry Gleason, the former pastor at Avow's Christian school who sexually abused him as a child. Flashbacks suggest Scott helped cover up the abuse by arranging Gleason's early retirement. Though the teacher claims to love him, Paul murders him. Unaware of Gleason's murder, the Jacobsons welcome the return of their prodigal son Paul.
2	"Episode 2"	Unknown	Unknown	9 April 2024	N/A
During an interview with Dana and her friends, Leon confides struggling to reconcile his homosexuality with Avow Church's conservative beliefs and teachings. Dana later publishes the full interview in a podcast targeting Avow Church. Guilt-ridden, Leon tries to commit suicide and is hospitalised. In retaliation, members of Avow Church harass Dana, Eden and Isla with the tacit approval of Pastor Scott. Leon clashes with his Christian mother. David disagrees with Scott's endorsement of conversion therapy to treat Leon. The Jacobson family learn about Gleason's murder and Scott attempts to downplay Gleason's association with Avow Church. Paul attempts to mend relations with his family including his sister Emmaline, who is married with two children.
3	"Episode 3"	Unknown	Unknown	15 April 2024	N/A
Due to the fallout arising from Leon's podcast, Isla has a falling out with Dana and Eden. Questioning her queer orientation and experiencing suicidal tendencies, Isla befriends Emmaline and starts attending Avow Church. Meanwhile, David has to deal with his adoptive mother Jen's alcoholism. The Jacobsons also become guardians for a troubled teenager named Mux, who was involved in a ram-raid, following the arrest of Mux's father. Pastor Scott takes Mux on an outdoor adventure and treats him like an adoptive son. Paul continues his investigation into the Jacobson family and seeks out his birth mother.
4	"Episode 4"	Unknown	Unknown	16 April 2024	N/A
Continuing his investigation, Paul discovers that his birth mother was Celia, who has since passed away. Paul also begins to discover his adoptive father Pastor Scott's shady business dealings. Growing disillusioned with Scott, David participates in a podcast with Dana and Eden focusing on Avow Church. David also seeks out his and Paul's birth father, who turns out to be the Māori businessman and noble Nate Young. Nate warns Scott about the consequences of exposing their secrets. During the course of his investigation, Paul is beaten by several of his former Avow school classmates including Isaac with Scott's approval. Mux finds a bruised Paul in the garage. Meanwhile, Dana visits her estranged mother who had forced her to undergo conversion therapy. Despite their difficult history, the two reconcile. Paul challenges his adoptive father by revealing he has bought up Nate's company, giving him a stake in Scott's business.
5	"Episode 5"	Unknown	Unknown	22 April 2024	N/A
David spends time away from his adoptive family and develops a relationship with Dana. He and Paul meet their father Nate Young, who reveals that their mother Celia was a pregnant teenager who moved to Australia to start anew. Paul loses his temper and assaults Nate but David controls his emotions. Later, Nate meets with Pastor Scott, seeking to reconnect with David. When Scott objects, Nate reminds him that his iwi (Māori tribe) owns a stake in Avow church's land, which he plans to develop into housing for his iwi. In a twist, Paul is revealed to be Scott's illegitimate son conceived through an affair with Celia, who was in a love triangle with Nate. David later confronts Scott for separating him from his Māori family and whakapapa (genealogy). Mux also talks with Paul about his beating. Knowing the truth about his parentage, Paul confronts his birth father Scott and vows to bring down his church.
6	"Episode 6"	Unknown	Unknown	23 April 2024	N/A
Isla reveals she is pregnant, creating friction with Dana and Eden. Emmaline offers support to Isla including promising to arrange an adoption. Paul confesses to David that he murdered Pastor Gleason. Meanwhile, David reconnects with his Māori roots and establishes an inclusive, alternative commune on land claimed by Nate's iwi called Erene, which attracts numerous supporters including Dana and Eden. Paul escalates his conflict with Scott and Nate by threatening to expose their fraudulent business dealings to the authorities if Scott doesn't resign as head pastor of Avow Church. Paul suggests that Emmaline could succeed her father as head pastor. Scott complies by confessing his adultery with Celia which produced David, covering up historical sexual abuse at Avow's school and announcing his resignation. However, Jen convinces the congregation to forgive Scott for his sins, causing Scott to renege on his promise to resign. Paul is arrested for Gleason's murder based on information provided by Paul. The series ends on a cliffhanger as several masked men attack the Erene commune, knocking Dana unconscious and setting fires.

== Production ==
=== Development and writing ===
On 7 July 2022, NZ On Air allocated NZ$5,551,956 to Warner Bros. International Television Production NZ to produce a six-episode television series for TVNZ2 and TVNZ+ known as The Bishop. The official description said that the series "centres on a charismatic young pastor who forms an unlikely alliance with a queer podcaster to challenge his father's mega-church, with explosive results." The series was subsequently retitled as Testify. Gavin Strawhan and Paula Whetu Jones served as screenwriters for the series.

=== Casting ===
Vinnie Bennett was cast as youth pastor David Jacobson, Craig Hall as pastor and family patriarch Scott Jacobson, Ari Boyland as estranged son Paul and Stacey Hayes as podcaster Dana. Supporting cast members included Molly Curnow as flatmate Isla, Kat Browne as Jen, Jessica Grace Smith as Emmeline and Holly Prestorius as flatmate Eden.

Hall described his character Scott as a "man of faith but his doubts and mistakes threaten to drown him." To prepare for his role, Hall visited several churches and also researched the Bible, cross-referencing and contextualising verses. He also listened to sermons from various countries. According to Hall, Scott regarded his son David as his protege but David was taking a more "open-minded" path that "causes Scott to try to rein him in."

Bennett described his character David as a "departure from the brooding or aggressive young men" he usually played and said "it was a strange thing playing such a nice person for once." Boyland described his character Paul, the adopted son of Scott and half-brother of David, as successful but troubled individual seeking closure with the past but "uncovering more than he expects," leading to an identity crisis.

Hayes, who is transgender, said that she brought her real-life experiences when playing her character Dana. According to Hall, the podcast subplot was a symbol of dissent within the mega church and was rooted in personal experiences.

== Release ==
Testify premiered on TVNZ2 on 8 April 2024. The second episode was released on 9 April, with the remaining four episodes released on a consecutive basis weekly. It was simultaneously released on TVNZ's streaming service TVNZ+.

== Reception ==
Tara Ward of The Spinoff concluded: "performances are solid, with Bennett, Hall and Boyland particularly strong, and the series raises timely questions about the role of organised religion in our society (when did worship become entertainment, podcasters Eden and Dana wonder, and is being a queer Christian an oxymoron?). Testify is a dark, brooding big-budget series with plenty of promise, but it’s strongest when it delves into the more sinister, secretive side of organised religion."

Dr Michael Frost and Andrew Urquhart of Christian television station Shine TV criticised the series's writing and said that it perpetuated negative media stereotypes and tropes of Christians. They conceded that churches needed to do more to correct public perceptions of Christianity in New Zealand.
