= Hīkoi =

Protest march or parade

The foreshore and seabed hīkoi approaching the New Zealand Parliament. The red, black and white flags represent tino rangatiratanga.

A hīkoi is a walk or march, and especially a protest march, in New Zealand. The word comes from the Māori language, and often implies a long journey taking many days or weeks. The most famous hīkoi was the 1975 Māori land march, on which supporters and protestors travelled the length of the North Island, from Te Hāpua to Parliament in Wellington, organised by Whina Cooper.

In 2004, a large hīkoi was organised during the 2004 foreshore and seabed controversy in opposition to the nationalisation of New Zealand's foreshore and seabed along the coastline. Marchers travelled on foot through cities and towns and in motor vehicles in rural areas.

A hīkoi with between 500 and 700 participants took place in Auckland on 25 May 2009, following an indication by the National government that it would not heed a royal commission recommendation that the proposed council for the Auckland supercity include dedicated Māori seats.

The hīkoi mō te Tiriti protesting the Treaty Principles Bill took place in November 2024, with an estimated 42,000 participants. It took nine days to reach the parliament grounds in Wellington, with some groups beginning in the Far North and Bluff. The Māori queen Nga wai hono i te po joined the protests in Wellington. Coinciding with the march was an online petition opposing the bill that received over 200,000 signatures.

Other local hīkoi are undertaken by people of certain hapū (subtribes) or iwi (tribes) to retrace ancestral or historical routes, to reconnect with their history or land, or to assess conservation impacts.

== See also ==
- Māori protest movement
