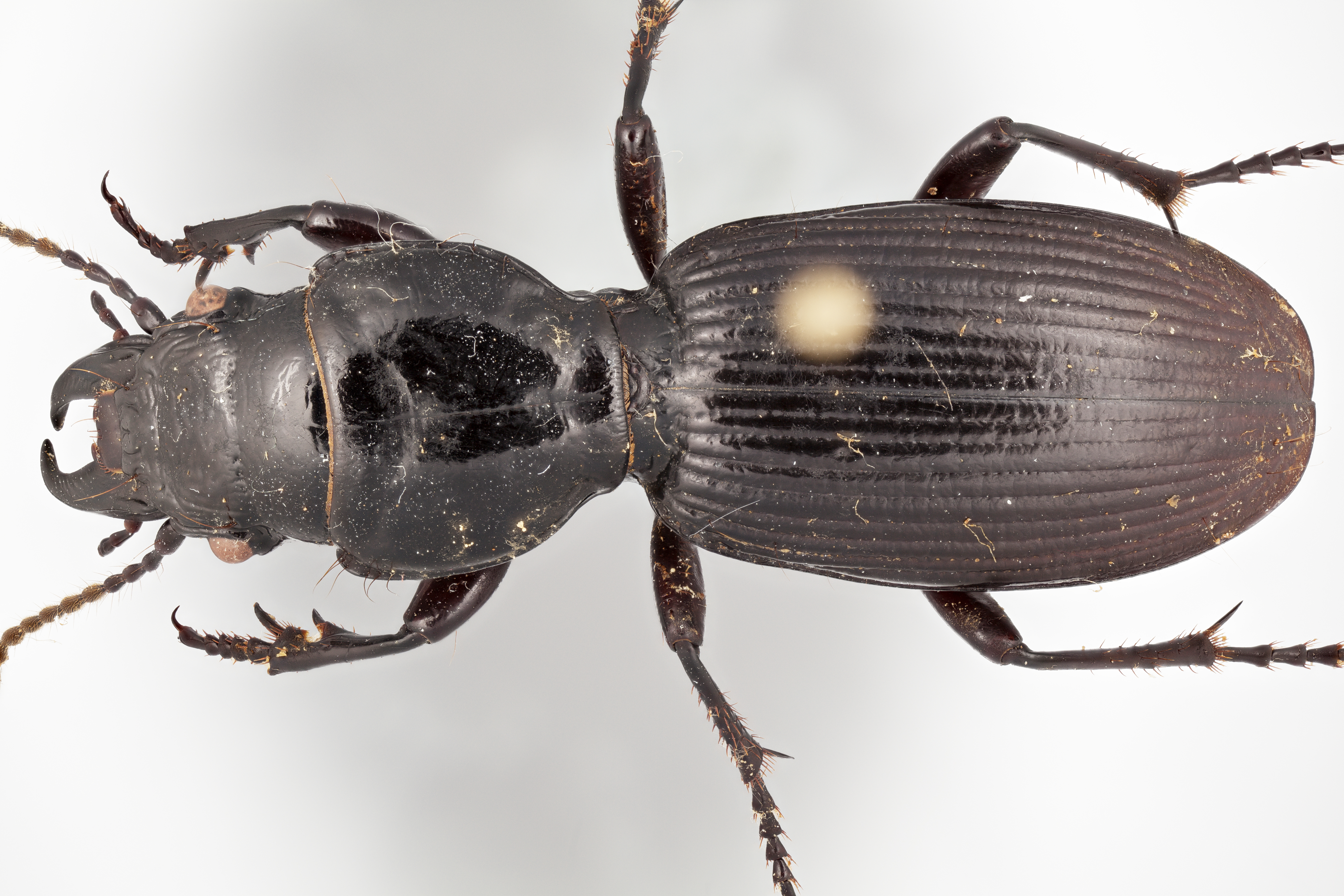

Scientific classification
- Kingdom: Animalia
- Phylum: Arthropoda
- Class: Insecta
- Order: Coleoptera
- Suborder: Adephaga
- Family: Carabidae
- Genus: Mecodema
- Species: M. kokoroiho

Binomial name
- Mecodema kokoroiho Seldon & Buckley, 2019

= Mecodema kokoroiho =

Species of beetle

Mecodema kokoroiho is a large-bodied ground beetle that is endemic to Warawara Forest Park, Pawarenga, Northland, New Zealand. The species name (etymology) was provided by Te Rarawa kaumātua Joseph Cooper, Waipuna marae, Panguru, Northland. The specific name kokoroiho means 'a beetle found with the fern root'.

== Description ==
The species is 27–34 mm in length, with a pronotal width of 6.5–9 mm and an elytral width of 8–11 mm. The body is matte to glossy black, the coxae and femur are dark reddish-brown, and the tibiae black. M. kokoroiho is distinguished from other North Island Mecodema species by:

1. vertexal groove broad and shallow with a few scattered, obsolescent punctures and rugose wrinkles laterally;
2. the pronotal foveae deep and narrow (distinctly formed by posterior sinuation);
3. intervals 1 and 7 continued to base;
4. distinctive shape of the apical portion of the penis lobe.

== Ecology ==
The adults of M. kokoroiho are readily found at night along the edges of mixed broadleaf forest, but are not as common in areas of Warawara Forest that have high kauri (Agathis australis) densities.
