= Jessica Grace Smith =

New Zealand actress, writer and director

- Born: 18 February 1985 (age 40); Ōtorohanga, New Zealand
- Occupation: Actress
- Years active: 2009–present
- Spouse: Benedict Wall (m. 2020)
- Children: 1

Jessica Grace Smith (born 18 February 1985) is a New Zealand actress, writer and director.

== Early life ==
Smith grew up in Dannevirke, but she moved to Wellington in 2007 to study at Toi Whakaari: New Zealand Drama School. She graduated in 2009 with a Bachelor in Performing Arts (Acting).

== Career ==
Smith appeared as Diona in the miniseries Spartacus: Gods of the Arena, and feature films Diagnosis: Death, Sione's 2: Unfinished Business, and The Devil's Rock. She later moved to Australia, where she spent three years attending auditions. Shortly before a planned move to Los Angeles, Smith unsuccessfully auditioned for the role of Phoebe Nicholson in Home and Away, before she was offered the role of Denny Miller by the producers.

Working with cinematographer Jessica Charlton, Grace Smith wrote and directed Flip (2019), a short film in the Kiwi tradition of "man alone" stories, but featuring a female protagonist.

In 2024, Smith starred in Testify as Emmaline Jacobson.

== Personal life ==
Smith has been in a relationship with fellow actor Benedict Wall since 2010. They announced their engagement in November 2019, and they were married at Wall's father's house in The Wairarapa on 8 February 2020. They have one child, a son, born in 2022.

== Filmography ==
Television appearances
Year	Title	Role	Notes
2005	Blue Water High	Stacey	1 episode
2010	Ben and Jeremy's Big Road Trip	Jess	TV film
2011	The Almighty Johnsons	Just Friends Woman	Episode: "It's Kind of a Birthday Present"
2011	Spartacus: Gods of the Arena	Diona	TV miniseries
2013	Reef Doctors	Becky	1 episode
2014–2015	Home and Away	Denny Miller	Regular role
2019	Ms Fisher's Modern Murder Mysteries	Prof. Elaine Montgomery	Episode: "Space for Murder"
2019–2020	Westside	Cheryl West	18 episodes
2020	Bondi Slayer	Jess	Episode: "Home and a Slay"
2021	Real Life Fights	Emily	Episode: "L.A.I.D."
2021	Power Rangers Dino Fury	Coach Bella	Season 1 (Episode 12: "Super Hotshot")
2022	My Life Is Murder	Rebecca	1 episode
2024	Testify	Emmaline Jacobson	Series regular

=== Film appearances ===
Year	Title	Role	Notes
2023	The Paragon	Emily	
2022	Frozen Moments	Candice	
2019	Flip	Flip	Short
2016	Best Mates	Fleur	Short
2013	Edwin: My Life as a Koont	Lucy Mason	
2012	Sione's 2: Unfinished Business	Lilith	
2011	The Devil's Rock	Nicole	
2009	Diagnosis: Death	Juliet Reid	
