= The Devil's Rock =

- New Zealand theatrical release poster
- Directed by: Paul Campion
- Written by: Paul Campion; Paul Finch; Brett Ihaka
- Produced by: Leanne Saunders
- Starring: Craig Hall; Matthew Sunderland; Gina Varela; Karlos Drinkwater
- Cinematography: Rob Marsh
- Edited by: Jeffrey Hurrell
- Music by: Andrea Possee
- Production companies: Chameleon Pictures; Devil's Rock; Severe Features; New Zealand Film Commission
- Distributed by: Vendetta Films
- Release dates: 8 July 2011 (United Kingdom); 22 September 2011 (New Zealand)
- Running time: 86 minutes
- Country: New Zealand
- Language: English

The Devil's Rock is a 2011 New Zealand horror film produced by Leanne Saunders, directed by Paul Campion, written by Campion, Paul Finch, and Brett Ihaka, and starring Craig Hall, Matthew Sunderland, Gina Varela, and Karlos Drinkwater. It is set in the Channel Islands on the eve of D-Day and tells the story of two New Zealand commandos who discover a Nazi occult plot to unleash a demon to win World War II. The film combines elements of war films and supernatural horror films. The film was theatrically released on 8 July 2011 in the United Kingdom and 22 September 2011 in New Zealand.

== Plot ==
On 5 June 1944, a unit of New Zealand commandos are sent to the Channel Islands on sabotage and distraction raids, to draw the German military's attention away from Operation Overlord, planned landings in Normandy.

Captain Ben Grogan and Sergeant Joe Tane land by canoe on a fortified beach on Forau Island. Heading inland, they hear distant screaming and gunfire. Infiltrating a German fortification, they hear what sounds like a man being tortured. As they begin placing explosives on artillery guns, a German soldier runs out of a tunnel pleading for help. Grogan stabs the soldier, killing him. The two investigate the bunker separately and discover the mutilated bodies of German soldiers. As Grogan ventures in further, Tane discovers a book of black magic and, distracted by its contents, is killed by an unseen assailant. Grogan, unharmed, later discovers Tane's body but is knocked unconscious.

Grogan wakes and is tortured by Nazi Colonel Meyer, who wants to know his mission. During the interrogation, Grogan hears a woman screaming from another room. He eventually escapes and chases Meyer into the tunnels, shooting and injuring him. Upon tracking the woman's screams to a room covered in occult symbols, Grogan discovers that the woman is his dead wife, Helena. Meyer enters the room and shoots Grogan in the leg, then shoots Helena in the head. Meyer explains to Grogan that the woman is a demon, summoned from a book of black magic found on the island. As proof, Meyer offers her a human leg; she changes into her true demon form as she devours it.

After Grogan removes a bullet from his abdomen, Meyer passes out. Grogan searches him and discovers a page torn from the book of black magic in a small pouch worn as a necklace. Grogan keeps the page after replacing it with another from the book. Soon after, Meyer recovers and explains the demon is a shapeshifter and a weapon the Germans plan to use against the Allies. As it cannot cross moving water, the demon is confined to the island. However, Meyer now realises the demon poses too great a threat to the world. Meyer offers to give the book to Grogan if he will help him escape from Germany. Meyer persuades Grogan to help him perform a ritual to dispel the demon back to Hell. Meyer, believing he is protected by the incantation sheet from the book, betrays Grogan at the end of the ritual.

As Meyer reveals his true intent to use the demon for the Nazis, Grogan overpowers Meyer and throws him to the demon, who brutally kills him. When she tries to convince Grogan to take her with him as Helena, he tells her that she could never replace the real Helena, and he chains her up again. Unable to complete the ritual alone, Grogan takes the book and leaves the demon behind, to prey on any Germans that come to investigate. He explains to the demon that he intends to come back when the war is over to finish the ritual and to banish her forever. He leaves the key to the chain within reach as he leaves the demon in the bunker. He steps onto the beach, buries a photo of Helena he kept with him, and watches as D-Day begins.

In the post credits scene, a German soldier enters the tower, finding dismembered body parts and empty chains. The demon appears behind him, having taken another human form. It starts talking to him, its voice slowly changing to its demonic one.

== Cast ==
- Craig Hall as Captain Ben Grogan
- Matthew Sunderland as Colonel Klaus Meyer
- Gina Varela as Helena/The Demon
- Karlos Drinkwater as Sergeant Joe Tane
- Luke Hawker as Private Muller
- Jonathan King as Suicide German
- Hadyn Green as Dead German
- Jessica Grace Smith as Nicole
- Geraldine Brophy as the Voice of the Demon

== Production ==
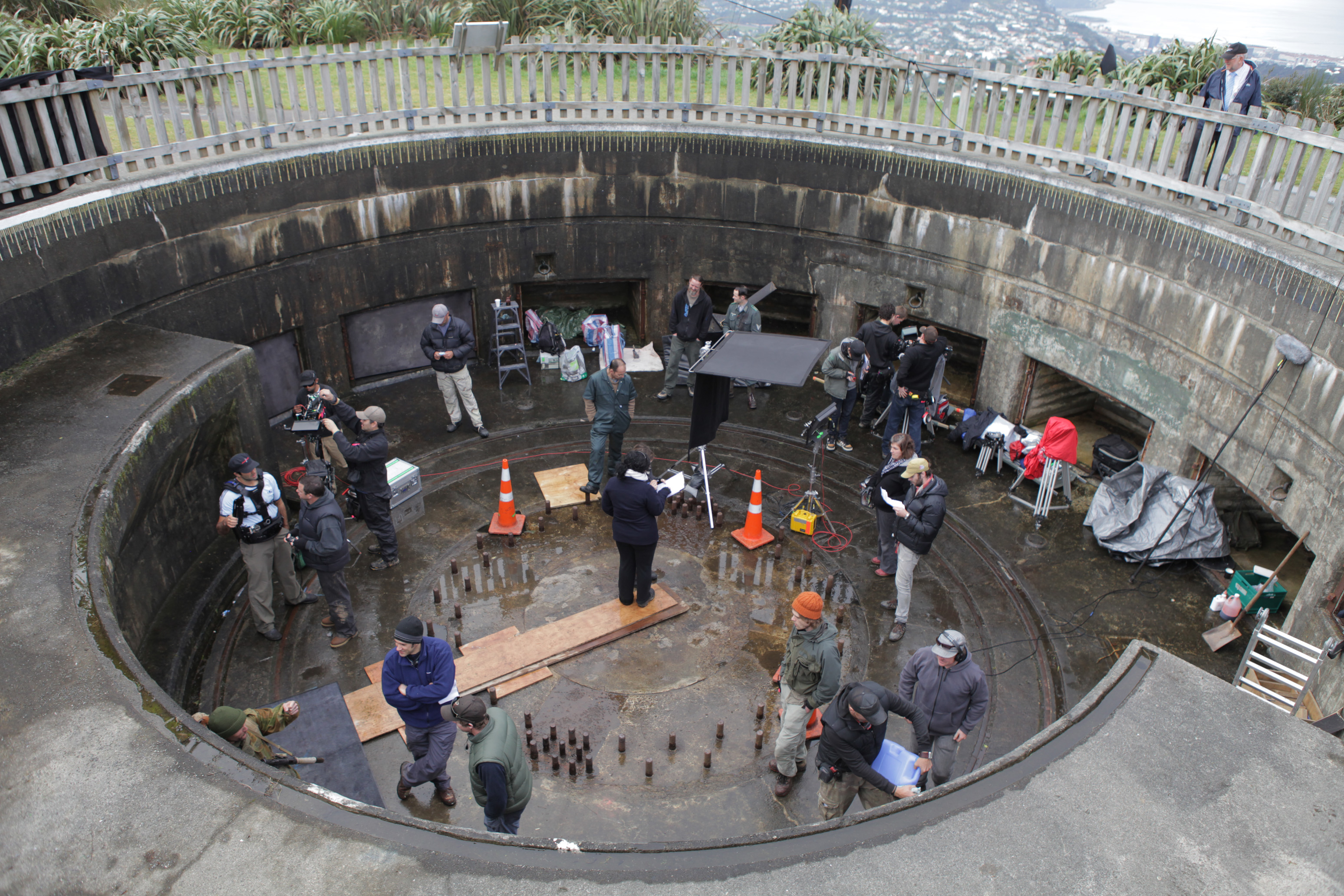
Filming The Devil's Rock in Gun pit No.1 at Wrights Hill Fortress

The film was produced by New Zealand producer Leanne Saunders and co-funded by the New Zealand Film Commission. Although set in Europe, the film was shot over 15 days in August 2010 in Wellington, New Zealand, on sets built at Island Bay Studio, on location at Breaker Bay, and at Wrights Hill Fortress, a semi-restored World War II hilltop fortification. Special makeup effects for the film, including the elaborate prosthetics used to create the Demon, were supplied by Weta Workshop.

== Historical references ==
The film contains references to real historical events, and Campion has stated that he based the story on the German occupation of the Channel Islands. Guernsey's history of witchcraft and the occult includes the existence of the "Bad Books" (books of black magic), and copies can be found in two libraries in the Channel Islands. When Grogan and Tane hear screaming from within the fortification, Grogan thinks it is other allied commandos who are being tortured, stating, "You know what they did to Blondie's men in Bordeaux", a reference to the torture of captured Royal Marines during Operation Frankton under the command of Major Herbert 'Blondie' Hasler. As Meyer ties Grogan's thumbs with a piece of wire to torture him, Meyer talks about the Allied "gangster commandos, who raided these very islands and killed innocent German prisoners with their hands tied behind their backs", which is a reference to Operation Basalt, a British Commando raid on Sark during which a German prisoner was shot dead whilst his hands were tied, which in turn led to Adolf Hitler issuing his Commando Order, upon which the torture scene in the film is based. When Meyer is attempting to interrogate Grogan, he taunts Grogan's New Zealand background: "New Zealanders, a bunch of farmers driving around the deserts of North Africa, attacking by night and fleeing to hide like cowards", which is a reference to the New Zealand section of the Long Range Desert Group. Meyer also taunts Grogan by insulting the Maoris of New Zealand, which he describes as "the descendents of cannibals and headhunters", which is a reference to a 1940s German radio propaganda broadcast.

== Release ==
Metrodome bought the UK rights in 2010 while the film was still in post production. The film was released in theatres and video-on-demand services on 8 July 2011 and on DVD on 11 July 2011. The film was released in 21 cinemas New Zealand on 22 September 2011 and was released on DVD and Blu-ray in December 2011. Entertainment One bought the North American rights at the 2011 Cannes Film Festival.

=== Film festival screenings ===
- Fantasia International Film Festival – Montreal, Canada, August 2011
- Icon TLV Film Festival – Tel-Aviv, Israel, September 2011
- Ramaskrik Film Festival – Norway, October 2011
- San Sebastian Horror & Fantasy Film Festival – San Sebastian, Spain, October 2011
- Yubari International Fantastic Film Festival – Yubari, Japan, February 2012
- A Night of Horror International Film Festival – Sydney, Australia, March 2012
- Zinema Zombie Fest – Bogotá, Colombia, November 2012
- BFX Festival 2015 - Bournemouth UK, October 2015

== Critical response ==
Film review aggregator Rotten Tomatoes reports an approval rating of 56% based on 9 reviews and a rating average of 4.8/10. Tony Lee wrote in Black Static, "Although it's a Kiwi production, The Devil's Rock feels like a more worthy successor to the Hammer Film Productions studios ethos than actual new Hammer-label product such as The Resident."

== Awards ==
The film was nominated for Best Visual Effects and Best Costume Design, and won for Best Makeup Design at the 2012 Sorta Unofficial New Zealand Film Awards.
