= Craig Hall (actor) =

New Zealand actor (born 1974/1975)

- Born: 1974/1975 (age 51–52); Auckland, New Zealand
- Education: Macleans College (1988–1992)
- Occupation: Actor
- Years active: 1992–present
- Spouse: Sara Wiseman (m. 2007; div. 2023)

Craig Hall (born 1974/1975) is a New Zealand actor.

== Early life ==
Hall was born and raised in Auckland, New Zealand. At the age of ten, he decided he wanted to be an actor, after seeing Michael J. Fox in Back to the Future. He persuaded his dad to take him to an agency after spotting a newspaper advertisement seeking film extras. He had braces at the time, so nothing came of it, but he persevered.

Hall attended high school at Macleans College in Auckland, from 1988 to 1992.

A workshop in 1993, with acting coach Kenneth McGregor (who was in New Zealand at the time, working on The Piano), resulted in Kenneth referring Hall to an agency. This in turn, led to parts in short films and television advertisements, laying the foundation for his career.

== Career ==
=== Television ===
Hall's career began with a role in the television series Hercules: The Legendary Journeys in 1996. Other early television credits included The Chosen (1998), Street Legal (1999), Shortland Street (1999) and Xena: Warrior Princess (2000). He then secured a regular ongoing role as Clint in The Strip (2001). He also had roles in Interrogation (2005) and miniseries Burying Brian (2008).

Hall landed a regular role in New Zealand comedy crime drama series Outrageous Fortune, playing Nicky Greegan from 2008 to 2010. During this time, he also played Carter Smith in season 2 of ABC Australian series East of Everything in 2009.

Hall's portrayal of real life physician, Andrew Bowers in the 2010 TV movie Bloodlines won him the 2011 AFTA Award for Best Supporting Actor. He then relocated to Australia when he was cast in Underbelly: Razor, the fourth instalment of the Underbelly crime drama franchise, in the lead role of Detective Bill Mackay.

In 2012, Hall was seen in the Australian drama miniseries Howzat! Kerry Packer's War, playing the role of Gavin Warner. The following year, he made guest appearances in Miss Fisher's Murder Mysteries, Tricky Business and Rake.

Hall then secured the ongoing role of Jack Duncan, a troubled veteran working as a doctor in rural Australia in 1950s period drama series A Place to Call Home for six seasons, from 2013 through to 2018. During this period, he played the recurring role of Chief Supt. William Munro in The Doctor Blake Mysteries, Inspector Rod Lynch in two-part crime miniseries Catching Milat (2015), based on the story of real life serial killer Ivan Milat and Ted Regan in Hunters (2016). He next portrayed private investigator Tim McKinnel in 2018 New Zealand television movie In Dark Places, a crime drama based on the true story of the wrongful conviction of Teina Pora.

In 2019, Hall was seen in Jonah: The Untold Story, playing Doc Mayhew. Then from 2019 to 2021, he played a lead role as coach Vince O'Kane in the first two seasons of rugby drama Head High. Both portrayals earned him nominations at the 2020 NZTV Awards. In 2020, Hall returned to Shortland Street, in the recurring guest role of the womanising Alasdair Rolleston, brother of surgeon Boyd Rolleston, after having previously guested in 1999.

In 2023, Hall was cast in the lead role of Scott, the wealthy head of an evangelical megachurch, in New Zealand family drama miniseries Testify. He also appeared as Detective David Medcalf in the Australian crime drama miniseries The Claremont Murders. Hall more recently had supporting roles in long-running Australian soap operas Neighbours and Home and Away, as well as playing the role of Harry Freeland in police procedural series NCIS: Sydney, all in 2025.

=== Film ===
In 1998, Hall made his feature film debut in New Zealand comedy Savage Honeymoon. His film appearances continued in 2003 when he scored the role of a Gondorian Captain in The Lord of the Rings: The Return of the King, the conclusion to Peter Jackson's epic Lord of the Rings film franchise. Then in 2005, he appeared in Jackson's film King Kong, opposite Naomi Watts and Jack Black, and New Zealand biographical sports drama The World's Fastest Indian, alongside Anthony Hopkins. Hall took on three roles in 2007, with American fantasy drama film The Water Horse: Legend of the Deep, American horror film 30 Days of Night, opposite Josh Hartnett, and Taika Waititi's romantic comedy Eagle vs Shark.

The following year, Green starred in New Zealand romantic comedy-drama Show of Hands with Melanie Lynskey. He appeared in Taika Waititi's 2010 comedy-drama Boy, and in 2011 he had a role in romantic comedy Love Birds as well as starring as a commando in horror film The Devil's Rock. He then appeared as Galion in the second of Peter Jackson's The Hobbit trilogy, The Hobbit: The Desolation of Smaug in 2013, with an ensemble cast including Ian McKellen, Martin Freeman, Cate Blanchett and Orlando Bloom. That same year, he appeared as Vincent Gregory in Australian psychological thriller film Nerve, opposite Gary Sweet.

In 2023, Hall played Drybergh, opposite Julian Dennison and Minnie Driver in New Zealand comedy-drama film Uproar, set against the 1981 South African rugby tour protests. In 2026, he appeared alongside Judy Davis, Jacki Weaver and Miriam Margolyes in road trip comedy Holy Days, playing Joe, father of the main character Brian Collins (Elijah Tamati).

=== Theatre ===
Hall has also acted for the stage, having performed in various theatre productions including Killer Joe in 2009 and The Lover in 2010.

== Personal life ==
Hall lives in Auckland and Sydney. He was married to his A Place to Call Home co-star Sara Wiseman for sixteen years, after having met on the set of 2000 short horror short, Home Kill. They also appeared together in the telemovie What Really Happened – Votes for Women. The couple split in 2023.

== Awards ==
Year	Work	Award	Category	Result	Ref.
2011	Bloodlines	Aotearoa Film and Television Awards	Best Performance by a Supporting Actor	Won	
2012	Underbelly: Razor	Equity Ensemble Awards	Outstanding Performance by an Ensemble in a Miniseries or Telemovie	Nominated	
2014	A Place to Call Home	Equity Ensemble Awards	Outstanding Performance by an Ensemble in a Drama Series	Nominated	
2020	Jonah	New Zealand Television Awards	Best Supporting Actor	Finalist	
2020	Head High	New Zealand Television Awards	Best Actor	Finalist	
2022	Head High	New Zealand Television Awards	Best Actor	Finalist	

== Filmography ==
=== Film ===
Year	Title	Role	Notes	Ref.
1996	Siren	Soldier	Short film	
2000	Savage Honeymoon	Dean Savage		
2001	Home Kill	Wayne	Short film	
2003	The Gateway to Hell	Pilot	Short film	
2005	The World's Fastest Indian	Antarctic Angel		
2005	King Kong	Mike		
2006	Perfect Creature	Det. Dominic		
2006	Knife Shift	Shane	Short film	
2006	Embers	Jonathan	Short film	
2007	Eagle vs Shark	Doug Davis		
2007	The Ferryman	Chris Hamilton		
2007	30 Days of Night	Wilson Bulosan		
2007	The Water Horse: Legend of the Deep	Charlie MacMorrow		
2008	Show of Hands	Tom Shrift		
2010	Boy	Mr. Langston		
2010	Captain Amazingly Incredible and the Space Vampires from the Evil Planet!!!	Johnny Depp (voice)		
2010	Das Tub	U-Boat Commander	Short film	
2010	Be Careful...	Mike	Short film	
2011	Love Birds	Craig Watson		
2011	The Devil's Rock	Captain Ben Grogan		
2013	Nerve	Vincent Gregory		
2013	The Hobbit: The Desolation of Smaug	Galion		
2014	The Light Harvester	Troy	Short film	
2016	Pete's Dragon	Adult Pete	Uncredited	
2022	Dark Noise	Inspector Stuart Thompson		
2023	Uproar	Drybergh		
2026	Holy Days	Joe Collins		

=== Television ===
Year	Title	Role	Notes	Ref.
1995	Hercules: The Legendary Journeys	Timuron	Episode: "Highway to Hades"	
1998	The Chosen	Darren	TV film	
1998	Duggan: Sins of the Fathers	Jason Bridges	TV film (credited as Craig A. Hall)	
1999	Shortland Street	Leo Kenny		
1999	Forbidden Island	Marine Lieutenant	Unsold pilot	
2000	Cleopatra 2525	Guard	Episode: "Mind Games"	
2000	Street Legal	Justin Lynch	Episode: "Heroin Chic"	
2001	Xena: Warrior Princess	Raczar	Episode: "Dangerous Prey"	
2002	The Vector File	Melvin	TV film	
2002	Mataku	Private Tatts	Episode: "The Lost Tribe"	
2002–2003	The Strip	Clint	31 episodes (main role)	
2003	Revelations – The Initial Journey	Joseph of Arimathea	Episode: "The Good Samaritan"	
2003	Mercy Peak	Ryan	Episode: "The Day That the Rain Came Down"	
2004	Raising Waylon	Alex	TV film	
2004	Ike: Countdown to D-Day	101st Corporal	TV film	
2005	Interrogation	Jason Sumner	Episode: "As If Nothing Had Happened"	
2005–2006	SCU: Serious Crash Unit	Narrator	Seasons 2–3	
2008	Burying Brian	Pete Donnelly	Main role	
2008–2010	Outrageous Fortune	Nicky Greegan	Seasons 4–6, 48 episodes	
2009	East of Everything	Carter Smith	Season 2 (main role)	
2009–2010	Legend of the Seeker	Drago	2 episodes	
2010	Bloodlines	Dr. Andrew Bowers	TV film	
2010	Denk nur an uns beide	Oliver	TV film	
2010	Avalon High	Coach Barker	TV film	
2011	Underbelly: Razor	Inspector Bill Mackay	Miniseries, main role	
2011	Emilie Richards – Entscheidung des Herzens	Oliver	TV film	
2012	Votes for Women: What Really Happened	William Lovell-Smith	TV film	
2012	Tricky Business	George Blake	Episode: "Bad Hair Day"	
2012	Howzat! Kerry Packer's War	Gavin Warner	Miniseries	
2012	Rake	Todd	Episode: "R v Mohammed"	
2013	Miss Fisher's Murder Mysteries	Jefferson Clarke	Episode: "Framed for Murder"	
2013–2018	A Place to Call Home	Dr. Jack Duncan	Main role	
2014	Auckland Daze	Craig	2 episodes	
2015	Catching Milat	Inspector Rod Lynch	Miniseries	
2015	True Crime: Venus and Mars	Grant Nicholls	TV film	
2015; 2017	The Doctor Blake Mysteries	Chief Supt. William Munro	9 episodes	
2016	Hunters	Ted Regan	5 episodes	
2018	James Patterson's Murder is Forever	Det. Marshall	Episode: "Murder in Paradise"	
2018	In Dark Places	Tim McKinnel	TV film	
2018	Constance	David Rooks	Web pilot	
2019	Jonah	Dr John Mayhew	Miniseries	
2019	Bondi Slayer	Josh	Episode: "Buffy Isn't Real"	
2020	Head High	Vince O'Kane	Main role	
2020	Halifax: Retribution	Ben Sailor	Miniseries; 3 episodes	
2020	Shortland Street	Alasdair Rolleston	6 episodes	
2020	Between Two Worlds	Detective Gordon Taylor	2 episodes	
2021	The Brokenwood Mysteries	Rory Grainger	Episode: "Something Nasty in the Market"	
2022	My Life Is Murder	Jack Sallinger	1 episode	
2023	The Claremont Murders	Detective David Medcalf	Miniseries, 1 episode	
2024	Testify	Scott Jacobson	Series regular	
2024	Neighbours	Victor Stone	35 episodes	
2025	Home and Away	Detective Mark Townsend	Season 38	

== Theatre ==
Year	Title	Role	Notes	Ref.
2002–2003	Red Fish Blue Fish	Tim	Silo Theatre, Auckland, Circa Theatre, Wellington	
2004	Gagarin Way	Gary		
2005	The Boys in the Band	Alan McCarthy	Silo Theatre, Auckland	
2005	The Mercy Seat	Ben	Silo Theatre, Auckland	
2006	Take Me Out	Kippy Sunderstrom	Silo Theatre, Auckland	
2009	Killer Joe	Ansel Smith	The Basement Theatre, Auckland	
2010	The Lover	Richard	The Basement Theatre, Auckland with Easy Company	
2016	Venus in Fur	Thomas	Aotea Centre, Auckland with ATC	
