= Mangungu =

Mangungu or Māngungu may refer to:

== People ==
- Issa Ali Mangungu (born 1981), Tanzanian politician
- Murtaza Mangungu (born 1959), Tanzanian politician

== Places ==
- Māngungu Mission, historic site in near Horeke, New Zealand
