= Jonah (2019 miniseries) =

2019 miniseries about Jonah Lomu

- Starring: Mosese Veaila
- Country of origin: New Zealand
- Original language: English

Production
- Production company: Great Southern Television

Original release
- Network: Three
- Release: 18 August – 19 August 2019

Jonah is a 2019 biographical two-part miniseries that chronicles the life, career and death of former All Blacks winger, Jonah Lomu, especially revolving around 1994–1996, the rapid rise and fall of his rugby career. It is directed by Danny Mulherson, and stars Tongan-Kiwi actor Mosese Veaila as the protagonist, Craig Hall as former All Blacks team doctor, Dr. John Mayhew, and Kelson Henderson as Phil Kingsley Jones, Lomu's former manager. It aired on TV Three on August 18 and 19, 2019, and is also available On Demand for one year. It is the first feature-film-length miniseries to feature Tongan dialogues.

== Plot ==
=== Part 1 ===
The story begins in 1996 after Lomu's meteoric rise to the sporting world, where footages of Jonah Lomu trampling Mike Catt marked his first major moment that launched him to international super-stardom. It helped him move his partner, Tanya Rutter, from South Africa to New Zealand, who later became his first wife. However, his immediate playing future in New Zealand is unknown, and with the debut of Super 12, he signed to join Eric Rush back in Auckland Blues. Moments after signing his first contract, Lomu found blood in his urine, which signalled his first sign of his health troubles ahead.

The movie then had a flashback in South Auckland in 1987, where a rapidly-growing Jonah (12) grew out of his church uniform that he just got from last week, and much like devout Christians, Jonah has been taught to never wander outdoors and play or work on Sabbath Sundays, but their cousin, Drew, managed to lure him away to hang out with his bicycle gang, where Jonah managed to steal a bicycle of his own from a motorbike gang leader. Despite not being the instigator, Jonah was more severely punished as he was the oldest in the family, and his anger and resentment toward his strict father grew. It drove him to join the Crips bicycle gang, which is Drew's gang. However, his first test mission to hide a knife failed, as he was busted by the cops. He also accidentally stabbed himself on the thigh while running into a ditch, and lied about him being attacked by Bloods. However, Semisi still found out, leaving him disappointed and wished he left Jonah in Tonga.

A few days later, Drew was killed in another rivalry gang fight. Days later, Hepi convinced Semisi to send the boys to Wesley College in Pukekohe in 1988, despite them not being able to make ends meet. Throughout his third form, his raw and natural talent for sports was slowly discovered by Mr. Chris Ginter, the college's disciplinary teacher and PE teacher, having gained first place in long jump, discus, javelin, high jump and shot put, despite not entering decathlon outright. He also went on to win the 100m sprint, which gained him positive popularity in the school.

He was recruited to play first XI rugby union in a traditionally rugby union powerhouse, but Jonah initially declined, since Jonah grew up in South Auckland, where touch rugby and rugby league dominates the area. A few months after, he left school grounds without permission to play rugby league for Mt. Wellington U-21, which caused him to be expelled, but later relented since Jonah's home situation is bad.

Jonah started his rugby career as a flanker, lock and No.8 due to his size and strength, but as he learns the difference between the two codes, and gaining respect from the seniors. After a time-skip to 1993, when Jonah became a senior at 18, he was already a try-scoring lock, and already had a taste of Sevens rugby, where his agent and manager, Phil Kingsley Jones, made first promises of his future.

Time returns to 1996 after his blood urine, he had doubts about marrying Tanya due to his parents' disapproval, so he went public in Paul Holmes' talk show, but after being hounded by paparazzi, he finally snapped and punched a photographer.

A month later, he won his first Super 12 title with The Blues despite only scoring 3 tries, and met John Hart, but a few weeks later, first signs of his illness showed. He had a lacerated shin that didn't heal, and losing aerobic fitness. He struggled to keep his kidney problems a secret from the coaches and Eric Rush, his roommate. While the initial set of urine tests were lost, the next set came back inconclusive, so Jonah decided to hold off until he manages to play in 1996 All Blacks Tour of South Africa. After being left out of the first match against the home team, he went out with the team, but was sucker-punched in a random attack. A few months later, a nephrology specialist cleared him for Barbarians tour in the UK, but he had the worst outing thus far with the All Blacks, having committed 3 turnovers, and failing to break away from anybody. He was formally diagnosed with nephrotic syndrome late in 1996.

When he started receiving treatment in 1997, he watched an old tape of him playing in 1994, the year when Laurie Mains suggested him to move from lock/flanker to a left winger, a trial in Counties Manukau was a successful experiment. However, since rugby in New Zealand was not a professional sport at the time, he briefly worked at ASB Bank.

In 1997, his health condition improved enough that his kidney problems are in remission, and has made his return for the All Blacks, but his relationship with Tanya soured, as he cheated on her, and was in a relationship with Fiona, a PA, leading Lomu to cede most possessions and caring rights their pet dog, Toby Jack.

The movies jumps back to 1994, when Jonah impressed in the Possibles vs. Probables trial match., which leads to his debut in Christchurch's Lancaster Park against France. Part one ends with Jonah practising the Maori haka while overlooking the Christchurch skyline.

=== Part 2 ===
After a shaky debut in 1994, and struggling to adjust to the move to left wing, Lomu vents his frustrations to Phil Kinglsey Jones, and feels dejected when he returns to ASB Bank to work a day later. Despite being dropped, he receives a fax from Sydney Bulldogs, an Australian professional rugby league team. Apprehensive about the move to Australia, he seeks advice from Eric Rush, who suggested him to treat the 1995 North-South Prossibles vs. Probables trials match as a swansong, in case if he did decide to switch code and get a professional contract. After Jonah's great performance, however, Eric and Frank suggested him to stay with the All Blacks, then make his mark in the 1995 World Cup, so there would be more options for him after the Cup.

Before the World Cup, however, his fitness already came into question, as Laurie Mains was known to build on the team's cardio fitness and endurance, two things that Lomu lacks. He initially brushed it off as he isn't 'built for long-distance', which may be true, but the blood test already showed impaired renal function while Jonah's medical insurance was being processed. He also put on some weight, despite showing no physical changes.

Time skips to 1999, ahead of the World Cup knockout stages, incidentally against France, the same opponent he faced on his debut. With his kidney problems in remission, he was in the best shape he could be. However, after the team was knocked out, despite him scoring 2 tries, Fiona was too scared to see Grant Kereama, who would become Jonah's kidney donor years later. He was hassled by some regular customers, fearing an attack, Nadine Quirk's father pulled him aside and treated him to a pasta meal. Nadine later becomes Jonah's third and final wife. In 2000, Teina was attacked by a crazed female fan in Wellington, leading him to never party out at night much.

Time returns to 1995, Lomu actually shows first signs of his kidney problems after gaining weight by retaining more fluid. When the team lands in South Africa for 1995 Rugby World Cup, the press is still sceptical about his position change to left wing, having started off as a flanker. To reaffirm his commitment, he shaved his eyebrow with the 11 gap, the squad number for a left-winger.

Time returns to 2002, when Fiona was asking about Jonah's wedding plans with Teina, it fell through 2 weeks before that wedding, and like last time, Lomu ceded his house and cars to her, while he moved in with Fiona. While Kingsley tried to make a damage-control press again, Fiona, a more astute businesswoman with a business degree, saw through him trying to siphon money out of Jonah. They let Kingsley walk, and he was relieved of his duties as Jonah's manager after a decade.

While Fiona was looking through a new contract deal, Jonah felt unwell, a checkup revealed that .a dialysis treatment actually strains the heart, so while his kidney may be better, a heart attack may still be possible. When he started, he met Penina, a fellow diabetic, but throughout his treatment, only Frank Bunce saw him, but even he was taken aback by the equipment and Jonah's plight. A few weeks later, as Penina died, he decided to propose to Fiona. A few weeks later, he returned to play for Wellington Hurricanes in 2003. He already lost his explosive power, and can only be a holding defender as he cannot afford to perform full strength solo tackles. Those are compounded by his minute restrictions. He later conceded that he needed to consider retirement.

Time returns to 1995, and footages of the real Jonah against Ireland was shown, where he scored two tries on his World Cup debut match, and Eric Rush answered most answers for him, as he became increasingly uncomfortable with dealing with the press, so Chris Ginter conducted a pre-recorded interview with him. There, Jonah recounted his rough childhood, and fully disclosed he physically fought back against his father. Fearing that the media could backlash, Jonah was simply telling the raw and ugly truth.

Time skips to 2004, with his rugby career nearly over, he was playing Grand Turismo 4 on PlayStation 2 and trying to get Fiona's jacket, he tripped, but was unable to feel his feet. Having lost 90% of sensations on his feet, he let pride get in the way and tried to walk down stairs, and tripped again. He later conceded that he needed a wheelchair, and he lost the ability to drive because he no longer has the ability to sense which pedal he was pressing. Grant Kereama still offered to donate his kidney after finding they both have O+-type blood, and other test also came back showing the matches, so Grant could become a live donor for Jonah.

Four months after the transplant, where the transplanted kidney is placed inside the rib cage, so it can be protected from the tackles and hits. In 2005, he made his return at Twickenham to play in an invitational match with Martin Johnson, but he dislocated his left shoulder in a tackle, and his glenohumeral joint was worn off.

In 2007, Jonah met Nadene in a club, but just like his breakup with Tanya, Jonah tried to deny and ignore everything, but a more astute Fiona tried to reason with him, and also tried to convince him to take it easy and retire from rugby. Like last times, he gave away the house and cars, except for his original Ford Mustang. When he drove off, he lost control, but he didn't crash.

A few months later, he visits John's family house, but he left Nadine sleeping in his car. A few weeks later, she was working in a night club, and as she is a teetotal, she thought her juice was spiked, she is correct that the juice was spike with Rohypnol, a powerful sleeping pill, but it turns out that she is pregnant, even when Jonah was deemed infertile, and Nadine had one of her ovaries removed. Unlike the last marriages, Jonah's family was pleased for Jonah, and are happy that they are finally becoming grandparents, and are receptive to the fact that the children will grow up in Wellington, Nadine's hometown. As the family was extended, they finally got married.

Time returns to 1995, after the quarter-final win, the night that was on Sean Fitzpatrick's birthday, where the story of him meeting Tanya was revealed, but the first meeting was cut short as she was led out by her friends. He then came to a bar session, where he discovered that he was on Rupert Murdoch's radar, which could launch his brand and increase media exposure, as Murdoch is a media mogul that later launched rugby into the profession era, as players used to be on semi-professional or even amateur status, hence many players needed to work in regular jobs to stay afloat. There, he and Tanya faced racial profiling by the South African police during Apartheid era, but when the cop realised the car was not a stolen car, and realised it was Jonah, he asked for an autograph. He was happy that he finally had no need to fear the cops due to his star power. In the semi-final against England, real-life footages of Lomu trampling Mike Catt, and going on to score 4 tries was shown.

However, time skips to 2011, when a frail Jonah is on his way to hospital in Auckland, because the body rejected Grant's donated kidney, and was resuscitated after he went into renal failure. He had outlived his 10 years life expectancy from the start of dialysis.

In 2015, footages of Jonah's final public appearances were shown, where Prince Harry presented the World Cup in 2015 after the team defended the World Cup in England. As he left the locker room, his friends, family and coaches worked around him. As he sees his current wife and his children, he morphed back into his younger self, and stepping out onto the field. As the screen darkens, his short obituary was shown.

== Cast ==
- Mosese Veaila as Jonah Lomu
- Dominic Tupou as young Jonah
- Craig Hall as Dr. John Mayhew
- Kelson Henderson as Phil Kingsley Jones
- Joel Tobeck as Laurie Mains
- Dominic Ona-Ariki as Eric Rush
- Michael Koloi as Semisi, Jonah's father
- Sesilia Pusiaki as Hepi, Jonah's mother
- Sepuloni Koloa as John, Jonah's Brother
- Valeria Davis as Tanya, Jonah's first wife
- Melissa Lawlor, as Fiona, Jonah's second wife
- Jacqui Nauman as Nadene Lomu, Jonah's third and final wife
- Colin Garlick as Chris Ginter, Wesley College's disciplinary teacher and sports coach
- Joe Naufahu as Frank Bunce, inside centre
- Luke Taplin as Sean Fitzpatrick, hooker and captain
- Phil Peloton as John Hart
- Daya-Tumua Sao-Mafiti as Michael Jones, flanker and no. 8
- Ross Anderson as Prof. Ian Simpson, nephrology specialist
- John McBeth as himself, rugby commentator
- Keith Quinn as himself, rugby commentator
- Phil Brown as Ric Salizzo, journalist, comedian and radio host
- Tarikura Kapea as Tenia Stace, Lomu's fiancée
- James Tito as Grant Kereara, radio host and Jonah's kidney donor
- Dimitrius Schuster-Koloamatangi as Drew, Jonah's cousin and Crips gang member
- Clara Lemalie as Penina, a fellow diabetic
- Mohia Mokaraka as Brayley, the eldest son of Jonah
- Jayden Richardson as Dhyreille Lomu, the youngest son of Jonah

== Reception ==
Phil Kingsley Jones was critical that the film portrayed Lomu as a villain, though being partly true, in the sense that he was not invited to attend Jonah's funeral (not shown in the final cuts), both he and John Mayhew were both father figures for Jonah. However, Phil Kingsley Jones' relationship with Jonah was not divulged in great detail, and many intimate details of Lomu's love life was also left out, as both he and Laurie Mains were not consulted in the making of the series, and leaving the public presuming the minute details as public knowledge.
