= Vinnie Bennett =

New Zealand actor (born 1992)

- Born: 11 September 1992 (age 34); Christchurch, New Zealand
- Occupation: Actor
- Years active: 2012–present

Vinnie Bennett (born 11 September 1992) is a New Zealand actor – of Māori ethnicity; Iwi – Kai Tahu (Ngāi Tūāhuriri), Ngāti Porou (Te Aowera), Ngāpuhi.

== Filmography ==
=== Film ===
Year	Title	Role	Notes
2013	Fantail	Bigman	
2014	Home	Older Son	short
2017	Ghost in the Shell	Rookie Cop	
2017	Beyond the Known World	Max	
2017	Resolve	Shane Maru	TV movie
2017	Human Traces	Riki	
2018	The New Romantic	Banker Andrew	
2021	F9	Young Dominic Toretto	
2022	Whina	William Cooper	
2026	Sgt. Haane	Hinga	

=== TV series ===
Year	Title	Role	Notes
2015	Tatau	Prospect Biker	2 episodes
2016	Filthy Rich	Vincent	4 episodes
2016	Power Rangers Dino Charge	Rata	1 episode: "Silver Secret"
2019	The Shannara Chronicles	Blackwatch Guard / Changeling	2 episodes
2019	The Bad Seed	Detective Bennett	5 episodes
2019	Breckman Rodeo	Vinnie	
2021	Good Grief	Beau	6 episodes
2021	The Gulf	Sgt. Taiaroa Gray	8 episodes
2024	Testify	David Jacobson	Series regular
2024	Friends Like Her	Rob Walter	Series regular

=== Video game ===
Year	Title	Role	Notes
2012	Far Cry 3	additional voices	
