= Mary Geddes =

Ngā Puhi; welfare worker, community leader

Annabella Mary Geddes (19 May 1864–5 December 1955) was a New Zealand businesswoman, welfare worker and community leader. Of Māori descent, she identified with the Ngā Puhi iwi. She was born in Mangungu, Northland, New Zealand, on 19 May 1864.

== Early life ==
Geddes grew up in Mangungu, her family had connections to the Wesleyan mission operating in the town. She was later sent to Auckland for schooling. Geddes married John McKail Geddes in her twenties. John was a successful businessman.

== Family life and philanthropy ==
In 1892 Geddes and her family moved into a large family home on Wynyard Street. During her time in the city she befriended Frederic Truby King. Both of them would found the Society for the Health of Women and Children, later known as the Royal Plunket Society.

Geddes served as on the board of the Young Women's Christian Association from 1906 to 1925. Between 1913 and 1919 she served as its president.

She sold her Wynyard Street home, known as Hazelbank, to the University of Auckland in 1939.
