= Paula Whetu Jones =

New Zealand director

- Born: 1971 or 1972
- Occupations: Film producer, writer

Paula Whetu Jones is a New Zealand film director and writer. She is best known for her 2003 documentary Gang Girls, the 2020 comedy series I Date Rejects, and the 2022 feature film Whina, a biopic on the life of Dame Whina Cooper.

== Biography ==
Jones is of Te Aitanga-a-Māhaki, Whakatōhea, and Ngāti Porou descent. She was raised in Hastings, and spent her early career making documentaries. Her 2003 documentary on the lives of New Zealand women in gangs won Best Television Documentary at the 2003 Qantas Media Awards, and was nominated for best documentary at the 2003 New Zealand Television Awards. In 2016 she completed a master's degree in creative writing from Auckland University of Technology.

In 2017, Jones was one of the writers and directors of the anthology film Waru, and in 2019 produced the short films A Matter of Time and Yellow Roses. The following year, Jones directed and wrote the TVNZ comedy I Date Rejects.

Paula Whetu Jones is a co-director of the feature film Whina, a biopic detailing the life of Dame Whina Cooper. Jones was initially approached to become a producer of Whina, but connected so strongly with Cooper's story that she asked to become a greater part of the production, becoming one of the film's cowriters and codirectors.

Jones created the television series Spinal Destination based on her experiences at the Burwood Spinal Unit in Christchurch.

In 2007 Jones began filming cardiac surgeon Alan Kerr and his wife Hazel on their visits to Palestine where Kerr performed surgery on children with heart disease. The film The Doctor's Wife was released in 2025.

== Personal life ==
Jones is a mother to three children. In 2010 she became paralysed from the waist down due to idiopathic transverse myelitis.

== Filmography ==
=== Films ===
| Year | Title | Director | Writer | Notes |
|---|---|---|---|---|
| 2017 | Waru | Yes | Yes | Anthology film |
| 2019 | A Matter of Time | Yes | Yes | Short film |
| 2019 | Yellow Roses | Yes | Yes | Short film |
| 2022 | Whina | Yes | Yes | |
| 2025 | The Doctor's Wife | Yes | Yes | Documentary |

=== Television ===
| Year | Title | Director | Writer | Notes |
|---|---|---|---|---|
| 2003 | Gang Girls | Yes | No | Television documentary |
| 2003 | The Hidden | Yes | No | Television documentary, also producer |
| 2006 | Attitude | Yes | No | |
| 2009 | Once Bitten | Yes | No | Television documentary film |
| 2020 | I Date Rejects | Yes | Yes | |
