= Issa Ali Mangungu =

Tanzanian politician

Honourable Issa Ali Abbas Mangungu MP

Member of Parliament for Mbagala
- Incumbent
- Assumed office December 2015

Personal details
- Born: 13 October 1981 (age 44)
- Party: CCM
- Education: Pugu Secondary School; Forodhani Secondary School

Issa Ali Abbas Mangungu (born October 13, 1981) is a Tanzanian politician and a member of the Chama Cha Mapinduzi political party. He was elected MP representing Mbagala in 2015.
