= Himiona Kāmira =

Himiona Tūpākihi Kāmira (1876/77 – 28 August 1953 (Note: Death date as noted on his headstone at Matihetihe marae.)), also known as Tākou, was a Māori tohunga, historian and genealogist. Of Māori descent, his principal Hapū were Te Taomauī and Te Hokokeha, and his Iwi were Te Rarawa, Te Aupōuri, Ngāti Kahu, Ngāti Whātua and Ngāpuhi. He was born in Reena, Northland, New Zealand.
