= Piipi Raumati Cummins =

Māori tribal leader, storekeeper and activist (1862–1952)

Piipi Raumati Cummins (c.1862 – 9 August 1952), also known as Piipi Te Kāmana, was a Māori tribal leader, kauri-gum dealer, storekeeper and land rights activist.

== Biography ==
Cummins was born in Waihou, near Panguru in Northland, New Zealand c.1862. She identified with the Te Roroa iwi and was the youngest of the five children of the Te Roroa leader Tiopira Kīnaki. She married Samuel Thompson Cummins, a Scottish shipbuilder, on 10 December 1886. The marriage was against the wishes of her family.

Cummins became a Māori tribal leader, kauri-gum dealer, storekeeper and land rights activist. She participated in tribal hui and in 1901 and 1910 she represented her people in claims to customary land before the Native Land Court.

Cummins died at Waipoua on 9 August 1952.
