= Māori land march =

1975 indigenous rights protest march in New Zealand

Māori Land March
- Part of Māori protest movement
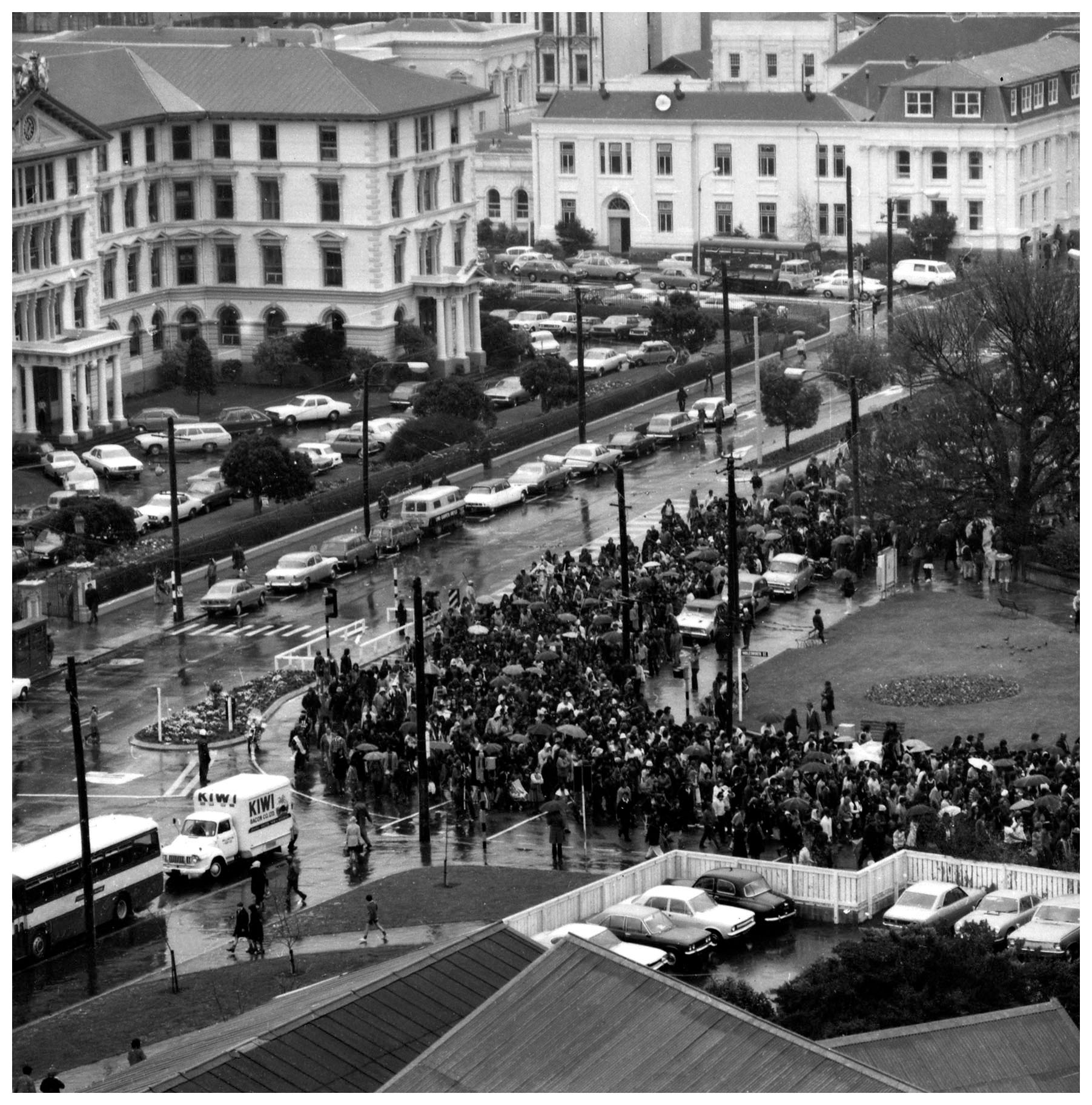
- The Land March arriving at Parliament
- Date: 14 September to 13 October 1975
- Location: New Zealand
- Caused by: Land alienation and cultural loss
- Methods: Marches, direct action

The Māori Land March was a hīkoi protest march in New Zealand that occurred from 14 September to 13 October 1975. An effort led by Whina Cooper and her group Te Rōpū o te Matakite (Māori for 'Those with Foresight'), the march intended to protest against the continual loss of land owned by New Zealand's indigenous Māori populations. A landmark event in the Māori protest movement, the march marked a shift in New Zealand's political consciousness about Māori rights.

The march commenced in Te Hāpua, the northernmost settlement in New Zealand on 14 September. Traversing the length of New Zealand's North Island, protesters arrived at the parliament building in Wellington on 13 October 1975. Over the 1,100 kilometres (680 mi) course of the march it grew from 50 to approximately 5,000 people.

== Background ==
In 1953, the government under Prime Minister Sidney Holland introduced the Maori Affairs Act to enable the use of what was called "unproductive Māori land". Applicants to the Māori Land Court could apply to have land vested in trustee ownership. The Maori Affairs Amendment Act 1967 introduced compulsory conversion of Māori freehold land with four or fewer owners into general land. It increased the powers of the Māori Trustee to compulsorily acquire and sell so-called uneconomic interests in Māori land. Māori worried that the law would result in further alienation of what land remained in Māori ownership following historical confiscations and acquisition of land by Pākehā (New Zealand Europeans). Although the legislation was changed in 1974, and the Waitangi Tribunal established in 1975 to hear Māori concerns, Māori remained concerned about historical taking of land (particularly given that the Tribunal was initially unable to consider historical cases).

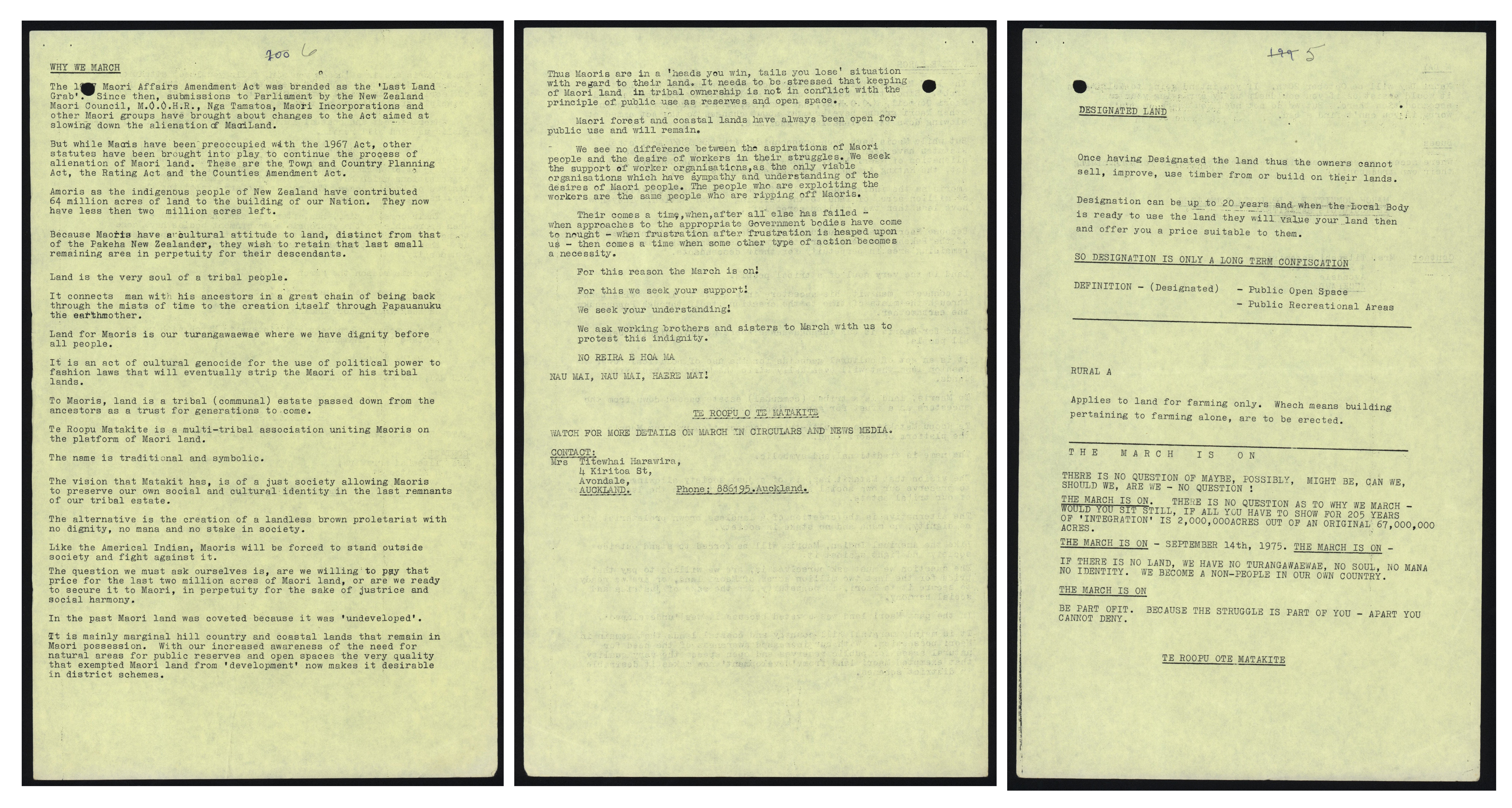
"Why We March" (Note: From a booklet issued by Te Rōpū O Te Matakite explaining why the Land March took place, addressing previous grievances Māori had suffered with significant loss of land.)

In early March 1975, a hui (assembly) was called at Te Puea Memorial Marae in Māngere Bridge, with 79-year-old Whina Cooper present. Cooper had earned much recognition and respect over the many years of her social and political engagement among Māori people and was one of the few women in the Māori community recognised as a leader. Cooper felt that existing organisations like the New Zealand Māori Council, which had existed since 1962, and the Māori Women's Welfare League, founded in 1951, were too traditional and a more modern approach was needed. The hui discussed a march from Te Hāpua, a community at the top of the North Island, to Parliament in Wellington. It was thought that the march would gain public attention and raise awareness of Māori concerns, particularly of the "twin themes of landlessness and cultural loss", and it would be led both by the young activist group Ngā Tamatoa and more traditional elders like Cooper; in this way, it was hoped the march would be able to attract support from a wide range of Māori. The following four months were used for planning and fundraising. In August all preparations were made and support and accommodation provided at various marae along the route.

== The march ==
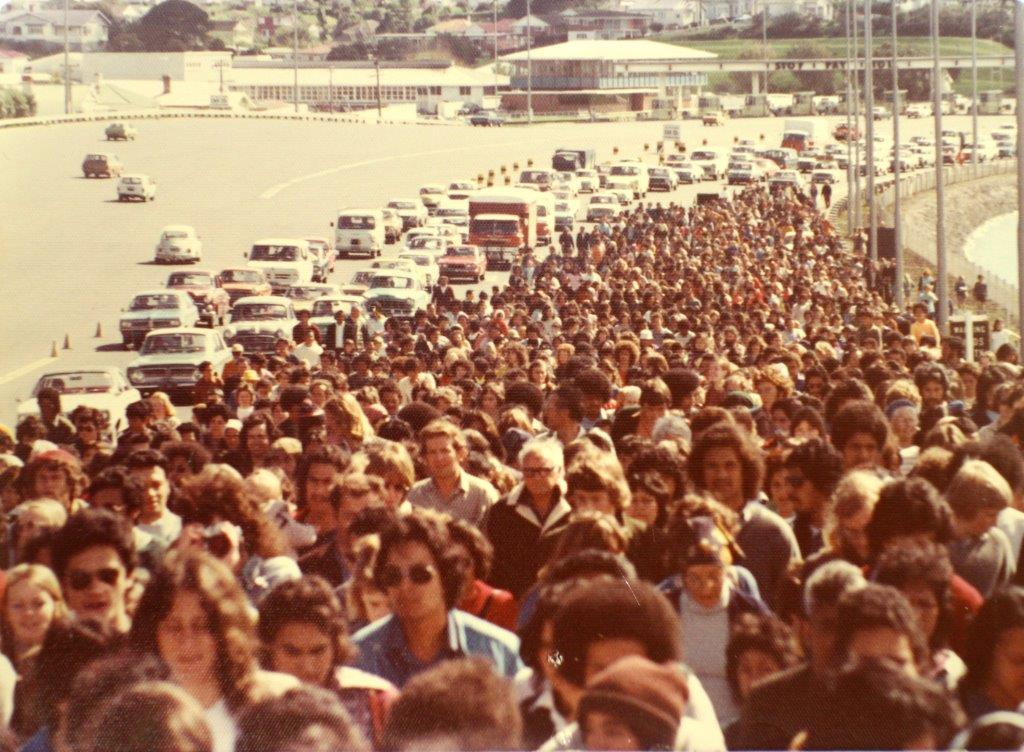
Māori Land March crossing Auckland Harbour Bridge

On 14 September 1975, the march began at Te Hāpua. It was initially made up of around 50 people led by Cooper, but grew in numbers as they walked through different towns and cities and stayed at local marae. By the time the march reached Wellington, around 1,100 kilometres (680 mi) from its starting point, it was made up of around 5,000 people. Cooper led discussions at marae along the way about the purpose of the march and along the way people gathered signatures for a petition which would be presented at Parliament. A key slogan for the march was "Not one more acre of Maori land".

Tama Poata, one of the young organisers on the march, described in his memoir how he and other young people handled a lot of the day-to-day organisation of the march, while Cooper and other elders were able to engage with local Māori at each marae that was visited and encourage them to sign the petition.

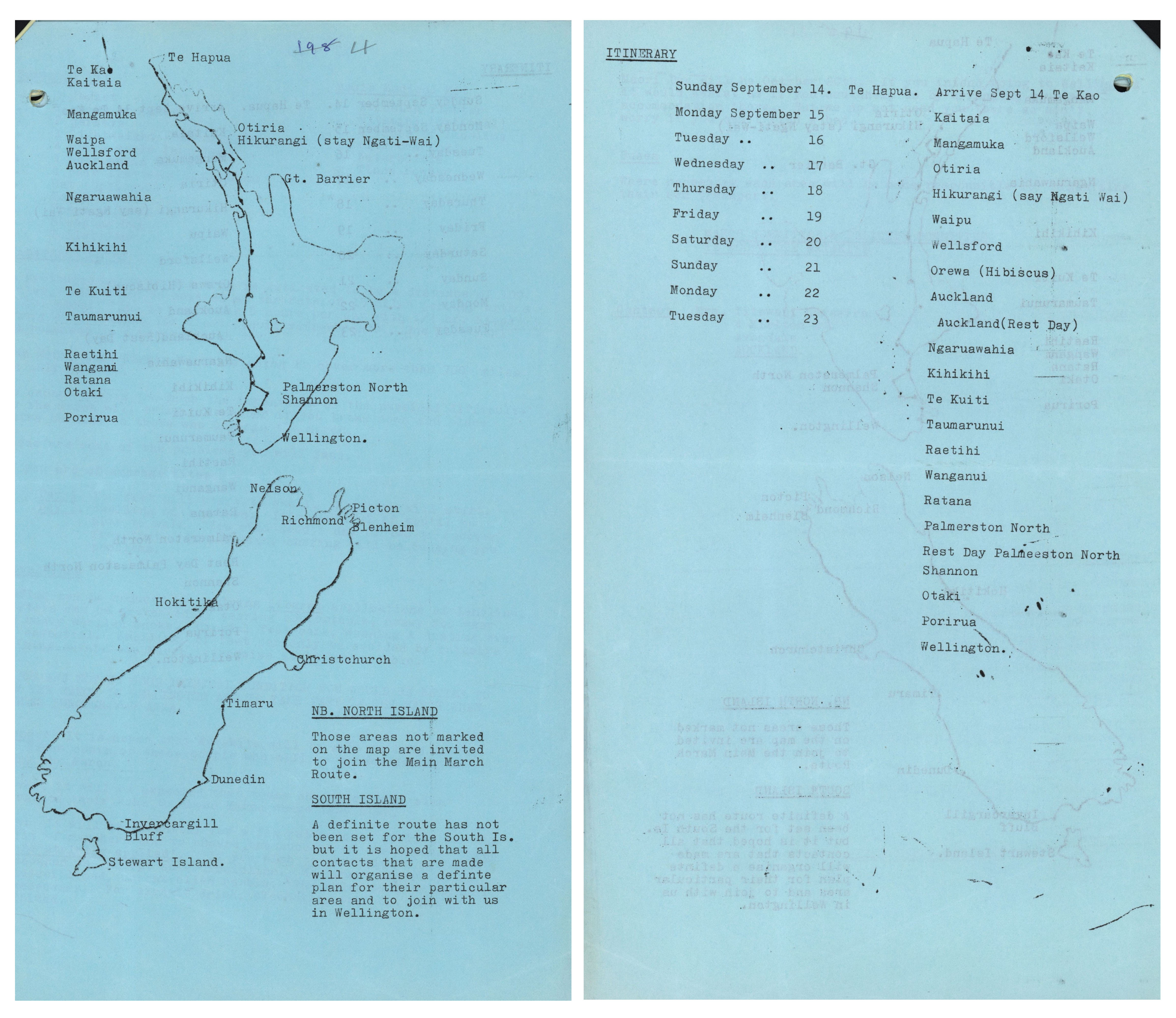
Route of March

The march, accompanied by two trucks and a bus carrying supplies, took 29 days, and followed a route from Te Hapua; Kaitaia; Mangamuka; Otiria; Hikurangi; Waipu; Wellsford; Orewa; Auckland; Ngāruawāhia; Kihikihi; Te Kūiti; Taumarunui; Raetihi; Whanganui; Ratana; Palmerston North; Shannon; Ōtaki; Porirua to Wellington.

Titewhai Harawira was one of the lead organisers of the march and a spokesperson for Te Roopu Ote Matakite who had set up an 'embassy' occupying parliament grounds after the march.

== Impact ==
Upon arriving at Parliament, Whina Cooper presented a petition signed by 60,000 people from around New Zealand to Prime Minister Bill Rowling. The petition called for an end to monocultural land laws which excluded Māori cultural values, and asked for the ability to establish legitimate communal ownership of land within iwi. The hīkoi represented a watershed moment in the burgeoning Māori cultural renaissance of the 1970s. It brought unprecedented levels of public attention to the issue of alienation of Māori land, and established a method of protest that was repeatedly reused in the following decades, such as the occupation of the land at Bastion Point.

== In film ==
The march is brought to life in the 2022 biographical film Whina, about the life of Whina Cooper. The march is used as a framing device, with much of the film consisting of flashbacks to earlier in her life, but it shows the growing support for the march, and the crowds reaching the Houses of Parliament in Wellington.

== Gallery ==
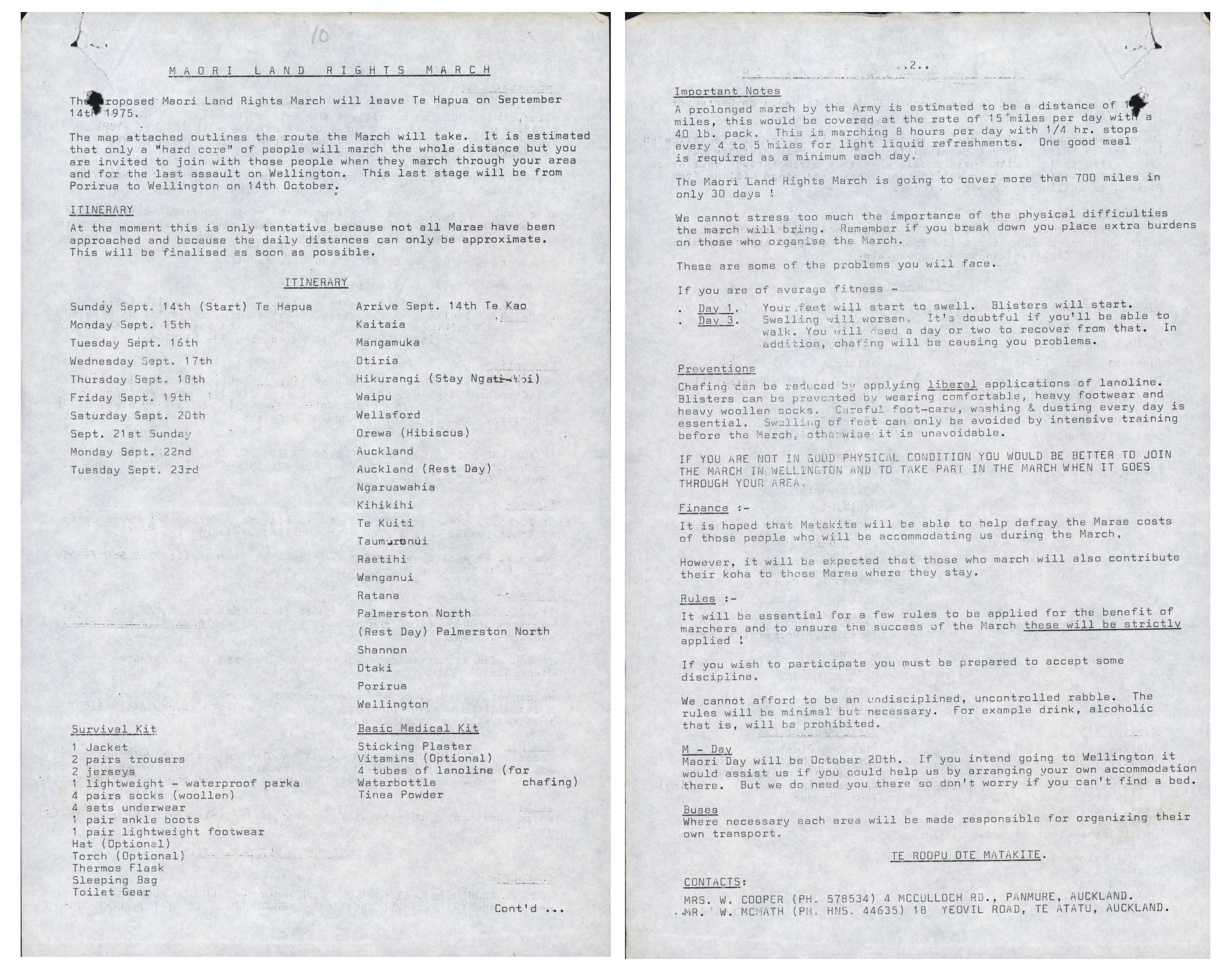
Instructions to participants

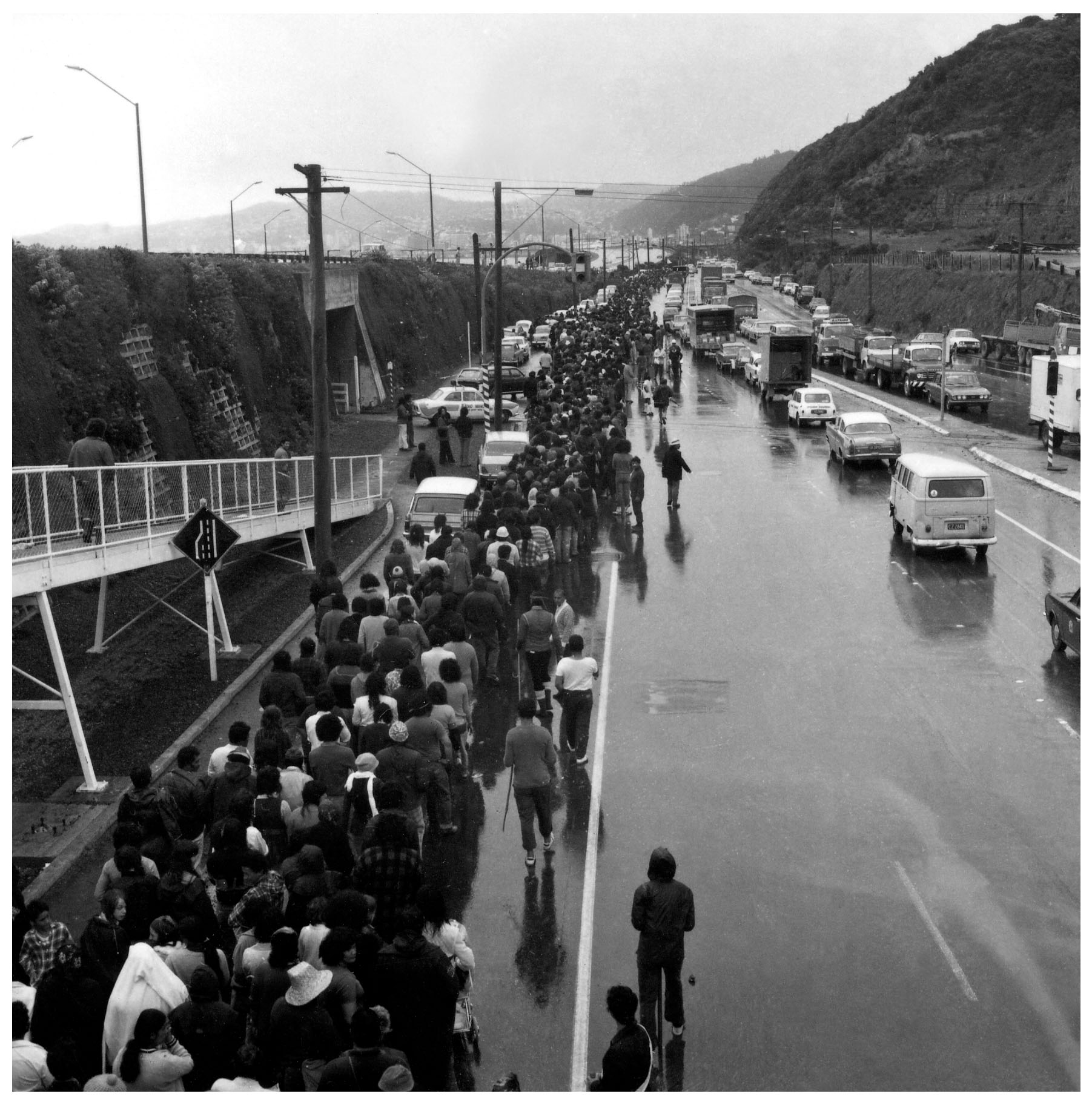
March on New Zealand State Highway 1 in Wellington

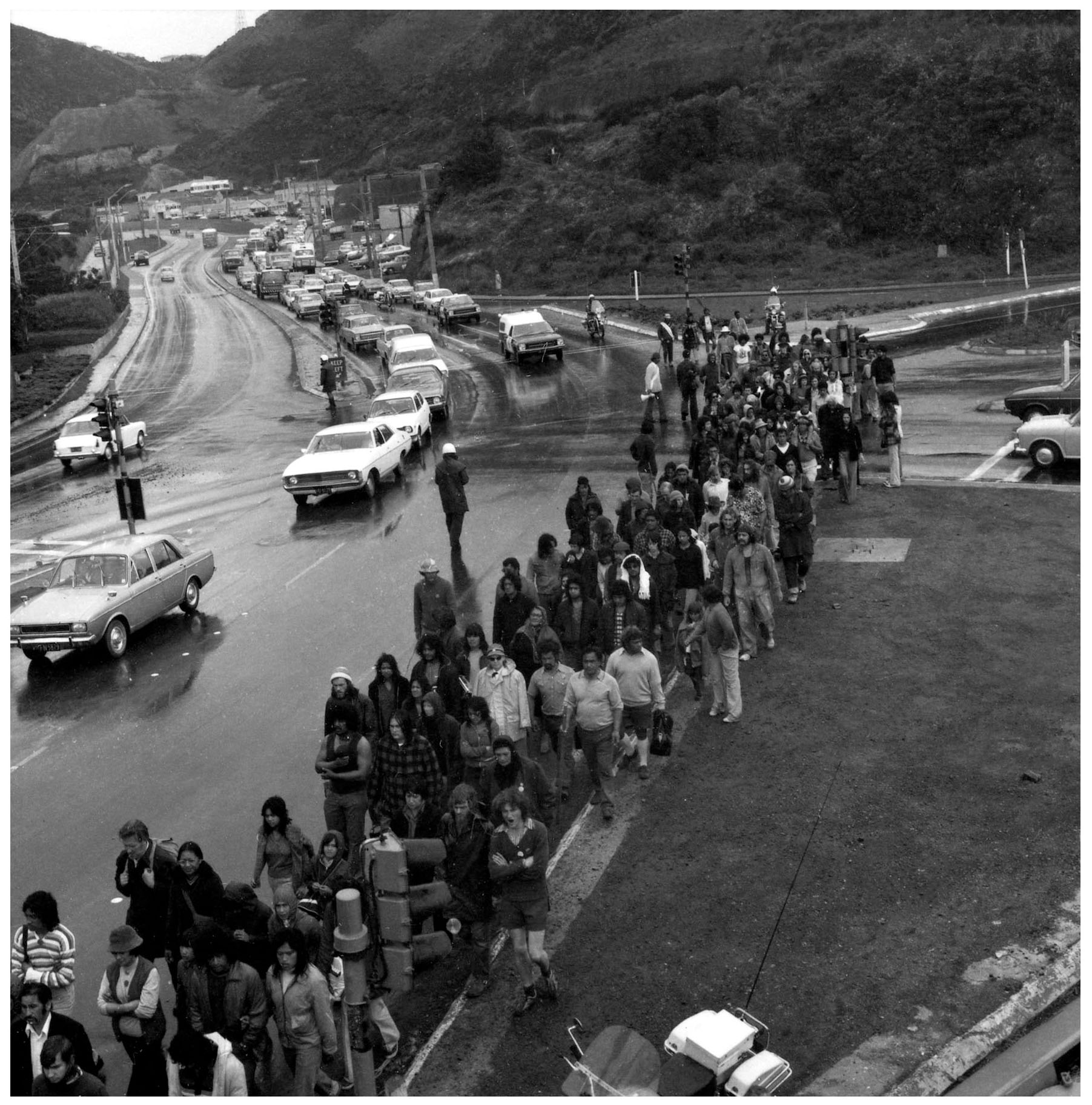
March travelling down Ngauranga Gorge, Wellington

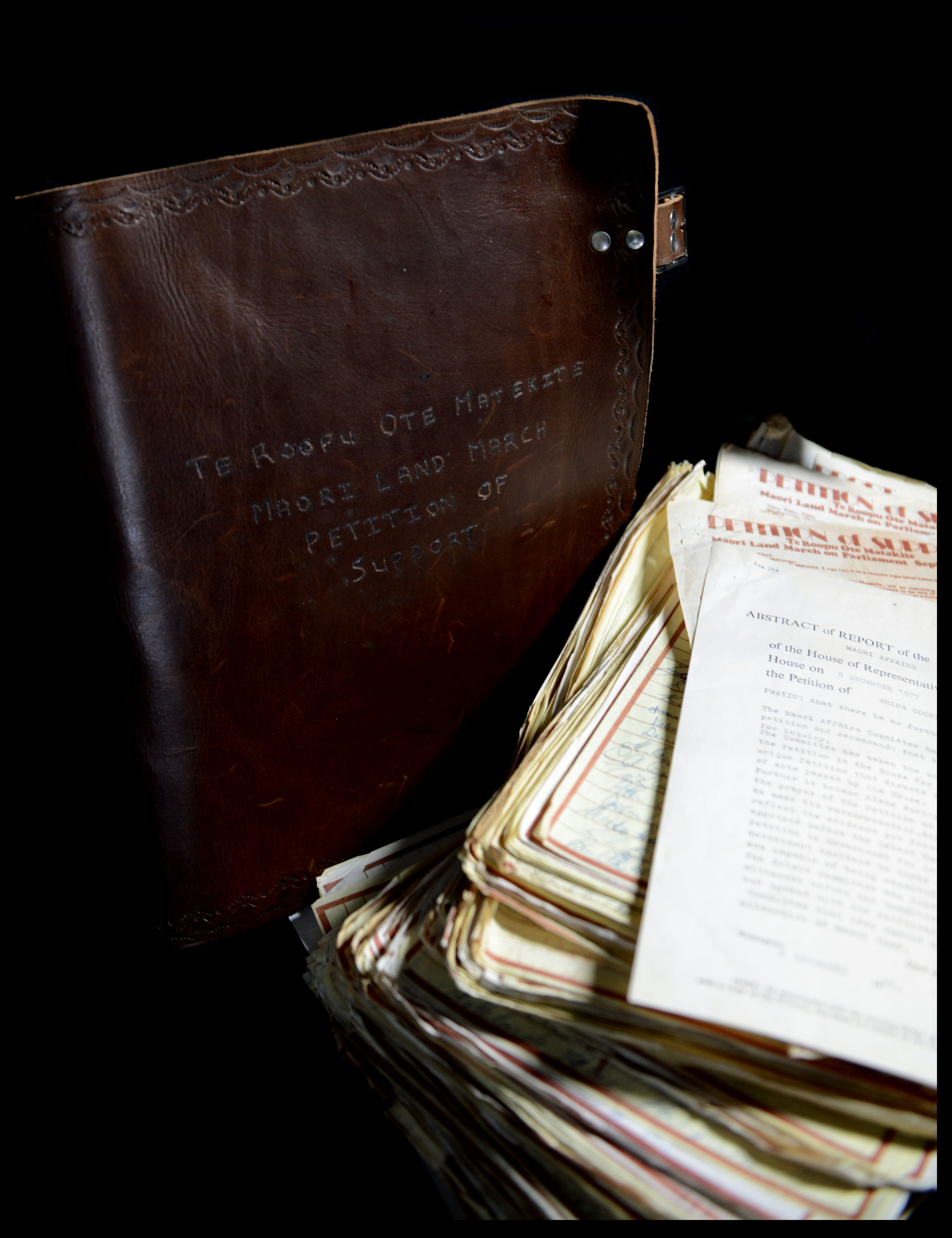
Petition presented to Parliament by Whina Cooper

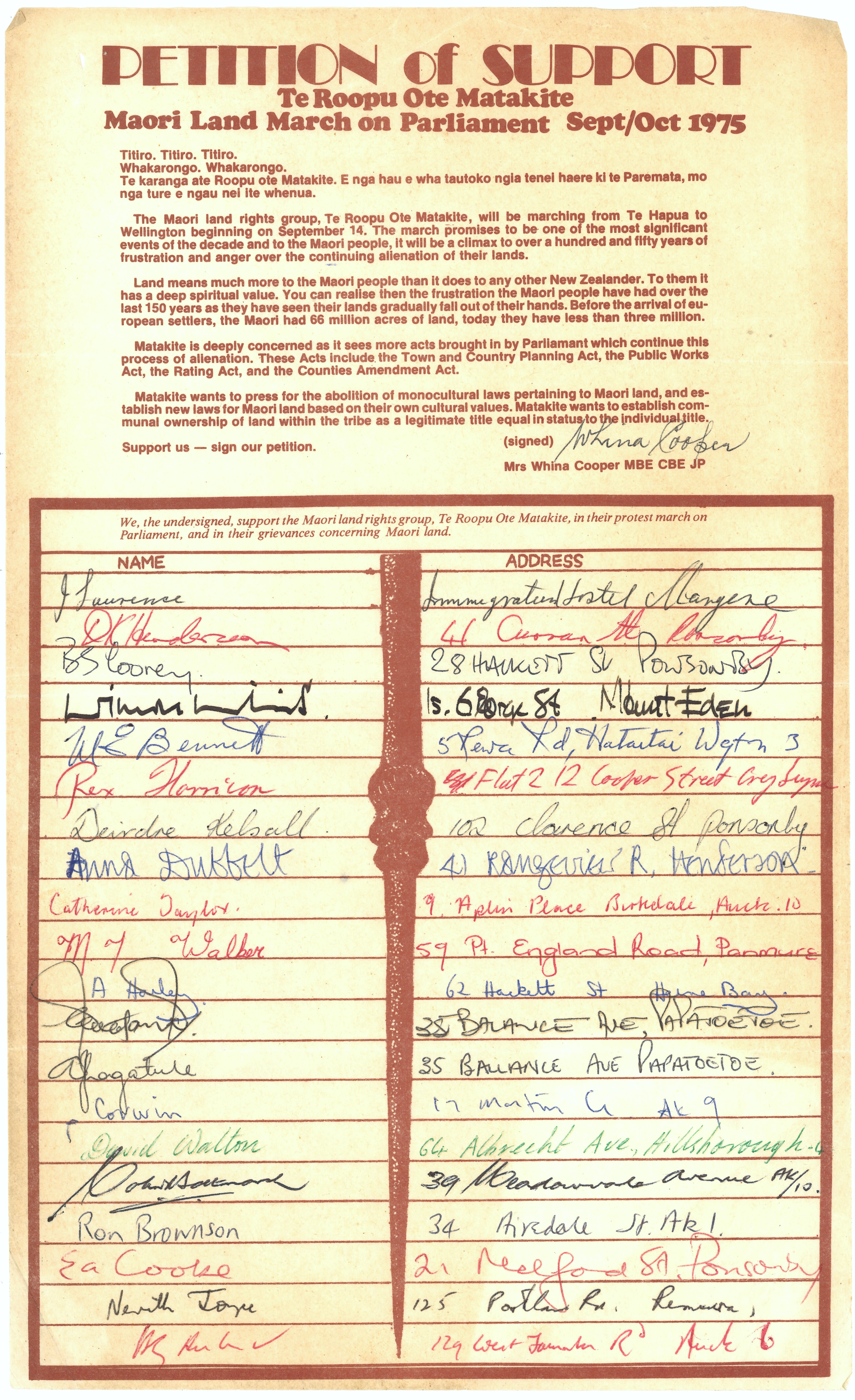
A petition sheet
