= Te Paea Cherrington =

New Zealand tribal leader

Te Paea Cherrington (c.1878 – 30 September 1937) was a New Zealand tribal leader. Of Māori descent, she identified with the Ngā Puhi iwi. She was born in Otiria, Northland, New Zealand on c.1878.
