= Panguru =

- Interactive map of Panguru
- Coordinates: 35°22′40″S 173°22′56″E
- Country: New Zealand
- Region: Northland Region
- District: Far North District
- Ward: Kaikohe-Hokianga
- Community: Kaikohe-Hokianga
- Subdivision: North Hokianga
- Electorates: Northland; Te Tai Tokerau

Government
  - Territorial Authority: Far North District Council
  - Regional council: Northland Regional Council
  - Mayor of Far North: Moko Tepania
  - Northland MP: Grant McCallum
  - Te Tai Tokerau MP: TBD

Area
  - Total: 11.19 km^{2} (4.32 sq mi)

Population (2023 Census)
  - Total: 121
  - Density: 10.8/km^{2} (28.0/sq mi)

Panguru is a community in the northern Hokianga harbour, in Northland, New Zealand. The Whakarapa Stream flows from the Panguru Range in the Warawara Forest to the west, through Panguru and into the Hokianga.

== Demographics ==
The SA1 statistical area which includes Panguru covers 11.19 km^{2} (4.32 sq mi). The SA1 area is part of the larger Hokianga North statistical area.

Historical population for Panguru
Year	Pop.	±% p.a.
2006	105	—
2013	93	−1.72%
2018	96	+0.64%
2023	123	+5.08%

The SA1 statistical area had a population of 123 in the 2023 New Zealand census, an increase of 27 people (28.1%) since the 2018 census, and an increase of 30 people (32.3%) since the 2013 census. There were 69 males, 51 females and 3 people of other genders in 51 dwellings. 4.9% of people identified as LGBTIQ+. The median age was 47.4 years (compared with 38.1 years nationally). There were 24 people (19.5%) aged under 15 years, 15 (12.2%) aged 15 to 29, 51 (41.5%) aged 30 to 64, and 33 (26.8%) aged 65 or older.

People could identify as more than one ethnicity. The results were 26.8% European (Pākehā), 85.4% Māori, and 9.8% Pasifika. English was spoken by 97.6%, Māori language by 41.5%, Samoan by 2.4% and other languages by 2.4%. No language could be spoken by 2.4% (e.g. too young to talk). The percentage of people born overseas was 4.9%, compared with 28.8% nationally.

Religious affiliations were 80.5% Christian, and 2.4% Islam. People who answered that they had no religion were 14.6%, and 4.9% of people did not answer the census question.

Of those at least 15 years old, 9 (9.1%) people had a bachelor's or higher degree, 48 (48.5%) had a post-high school certificate or diploma, and 42 (42.4%) people exclusively held high school qualifications. The median income was $23,800, compared with $41,500 nationally. 3 people (3.0%) earned over $100,000 compared to 12.1% nationally. The employment status of those at least 15 was that 18 (18.2%) people were employed full-time, 15 (15.2%) were part-time, and 9 (9.1%) were unemployed.

=== Hokianga North statistical area ===
Hokianga North statistical area covers the western side of the area between Hokianga Harbour and Whangape Harbour, including the locality of Matihetihe. It has an area of 347.98 km^{2} (134.36 sq mi) and had an estimated population of 920 as of June 2025, with a population density of 2.6 people per km^{2}.

Historical population for Hokianga North
Year	Pop.	±% p.a.
2006	813	—
2013	744	−1.26%
2018	795	+1.33%
2023	912	+2.78%

Hokianga North had a population of 912 in the 2023 New Zealand census, an increase of 117 people (14.7%) since the 2018 census, and an increase of 168 people (22.6%) since the 2013 census. There were 474 males, 438 females and 3 people of other genders in 336 dwellings. 1.6% of people identified as LGBTIQ+. The median age was 43.5 years (compared with 38.1 years nationally). There were 204 people (22.4%) aged under 15 years, 120 (13.2%) aged 15 to 29, 405 (44.4%) aged 30 to 64, and 186 (20.4%) aged 65 or older.

People could identify as more than one ethnicity. The results were 30.9% European (Pākehā), 87.2% Māori, 6.6% Pasifika, 1.3% Asian, and 1.3% other, which includes people giving their ethnicity as "New Zealander". English was spoken by 94.7%, Māori language by 40.1%, Samoan by 1.0% and other languages by 1.3%. No language could be spoken by 2.3% (e.g. too young to talk). New Zealand Sign Language was known by 0.3%. The percentage of people born overseas was 4.6, compared with 28.8% nationally.

Religious affiliations were 61.2% Christian, 0.3% Islam, 3.9% Māori religious beliefs, 0.3% New Age, and 0.7% other religions. People who answered that they had no religion were 29.3%, and 4.6% of people did not answer the census question.

Of those at least 15 years old, 54 (7.6%) people had a bachelor's or higher degree, 399 (56.4%) had a post-high school certificate or diploma, and 246 (34.7%) people exclusively held high school qualifications. The median income was $23,600, compared with $41,500 nationally. 9 people (1.3%) earned over $100,000 compared to 12.1% nationally. The employment status of those at least 15 was that 195 (27.5%) people were employed full-time, 108 (15.3%) were part-time, and 60 (8.5%) were unemployed.

== History and culture ==
Panguru began as a Catholic settlement. It was named Whakarapa until 1923, when Whina Cooper called a public meeting that led to the name being changed to distinguish it from another settlement of that name.

There are two marae in the area connected to Te Rarawa hapū:

- Ngāti Manawa or Te Waiariki Marae and Te Rarawa meeting house are affiliated with Ngāti Manawa, Te Kai Tutae and Te Waiariki.
- Waipuna Marae and Te Puna I Te Ao Marama meeting house are affiliated with Te Kai Tutae and Te Waiariki.

== Education ==
Te Kura Taumata o Panguru is a coeducational composite (years 1–15) school with a roll of 112 students as of July 2026.

It was the smallest high school in New Zealand at the time of its establishment in 1964.

== Notable people ==
- Adam Blair, Rugby league player
- Dame Whina Cooper, respected Māori elder
- Piipi Raumati Cummins, Māori tribal leader, kauri-gum dealer, storekeeper and land rights activist
- Meri Te Tai Mangakāhia, spoke in 1892 at Te Kotahitangi on women's right to vote and stand for election in the Māori parliament
