= Te Hāpua =

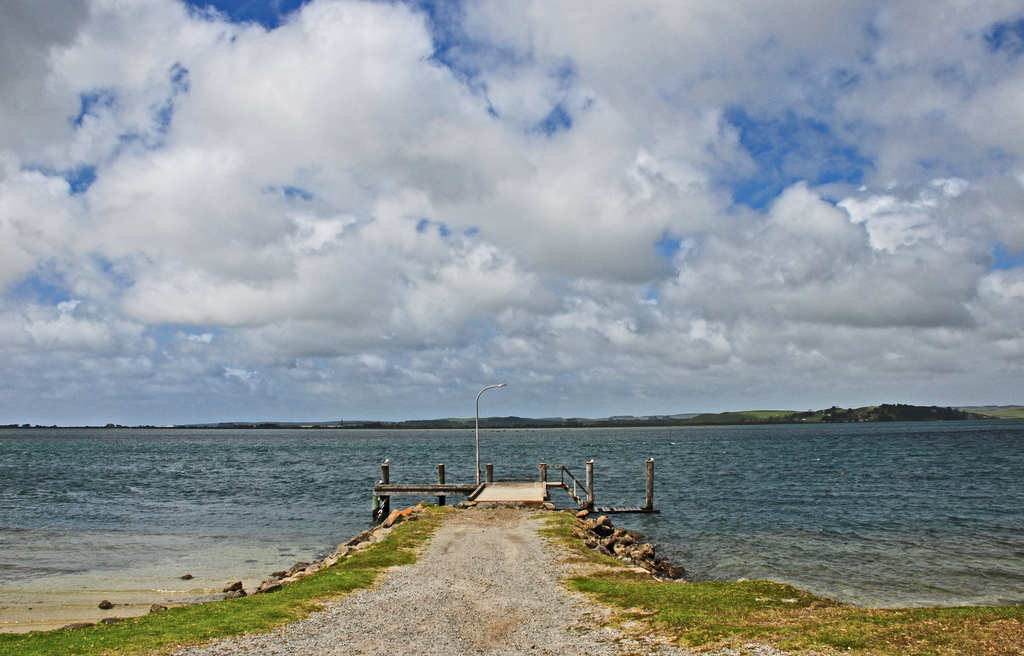
- Te Hapua Wharf
- Interactive map of Te Hāpua
- Coordinates: 34°31′2″S 172°54′45″E
- Country: New Zealand
- Region: Northland Region
- District: Far North District
- Ward: Te Hiku
- Community: Te Hiku
- Subdivision: North Cape
- Electorates: Northland; Te Tai Tokerau

Government
  - Territorial Authority: Far North District Council
  - Regional council: Northland Regional Council
  - Mayor of Far North: Moko Tepania
  - Northland MP: Grant McCallum
  - Te Tai Tokerau MP: Mariameno Kapa-Kingi

Te Hāpua is a community on the shores of the Parengarenga Harbour in Northland, New Zealand. The road to Te Hāpua leaves State Highway 1 at Waitiki Landing. There are no shops or motels.

Te Hāpua is the most northerly settlement in New Zealand. The 2013 Census recorded 84 people in the Te Hapua region.

The New Zealand Ministry for Culture and Heritage gives a translation of "the lagoon" for Te Hāpua.

Matiu Rata, Cabinet Minister in the Third Labour Government in the 1970s and founder of the Mana Motuhake party, was born in Te Hāpua in 1934 and buried there in his Rātana robes.

The 1975 Māori land march left Te Hāpua for Wellington on 14 September 1975 (Maori Language Day).

Te Hāpua's Te Reo Mihi Marae is a traditional meeting ground for Ngāti Kurī, and includes Te Reo Mihi meeting house.

== Demographics ==
Te Hāpua is in an SA1 statistical area which covers 285.48 km^{2} (110.22 sq mi) and includes the area north of Waitiki Landing. The SA1 area is part of the larger North Cape statistical area.

Historical population
Year	Pop.	±% p.a.
2006	165	—
2013	144	−1.93%
2018	141	−0.42%
2023	222	+9.50%

The SA1 statistical area had a population of 222 in the 2023 New Zealand census, an increase of 81 people (57.4%) since the 2018 census, and an increase of 78 people (54.2%) since the 2013 census. There were 114 males, and 108 females in 75 dwellings. 2.7% of people identified as LGBTIQ+. The median age was 37.6 years (compared with 38.1 years nationally). There were 51 people (23.0%) aged under 15 years, 45 (20.3%) aged 15 to 29, 96 (43.2%) aged 30 to 64, and 33 (14.9%) aged 65 or older.

People could identify as more than one ethnicity. The results were 24.3% European (Pākehā); 89.2% Māori; 9.5% Pasifika; 1.4% Asian; and 2.7% other, which includes people giving their ethnicity as "New Zealander". English was spoken by 98.6%, Māori language by 33.8%, and other languages by 1.4%. No language could be spoken by 1.4% (e.g. too young to talk). The percentage of people born overseas was 4.1, compared with 28.8% nationally.

Religious affiliations were 13.5% Christian, and 58.1% Māori religious beliefs. People who answered that they had no religion were 23.0%, and 8.1% of people did not answer the census question.

Of those at least 15 years old, 12 (7.0%) people had a bachelor's or higher degree, 81 (47.4%) had a post-high school certificate or diploma, and 78 (45.6%) people exclusively held high school qualifications. The median income was $23,500, compared with $41,500 nationally. The employment status of those at least 15 was that 57 (33.3%) people were employed full-time, 15 (8.8%) were part-time, and 18 (10.5%) were unemployed.

== Education ==
Te Hāpua School is a coeducational full primary (years 1–8) school with a decile rating of 1 and a roll of 13. It is New Zealand's northernmost school. It started as Parengarenga Native School in 1896, and was a Māori school until 1969, when the Education Amendment Act 1968 transferred all Māori schools to local education board control.

== Climate ==
Te Hapua has a temperature oceanic climate (Cfb according to the Köppen climate classification), like much of New Zealand, with warm summers, mild winters and no dry season. The average annual temperature is 16.4 °C (61.5 °F), the annual average high temperature is 20.2 °C (68.4 °F) and the annual average low temperature is 12.7 °C (54.9 °F). The warmest month in Te Hapua is February, with a mean of 20.7 °C (69.3 °F) and an average high of 24.9 °C (76.8 °F). The coolest months are July and August, with a mean of 12.9 °C (55.2 °F) for both months. Due to its maritime location, the ocean moderates temperatures year-round, and there is some seasonal lag.

Te Hapua receives 998 millimetres (39.3 in) of precipitation each year. Although there is no dry season, winter is usually wetter than summer. The wettest month is July, which receives 116.0 millimetres (4.57 in) of precipitation each year, while the driest month is January, which receives 61.0 millimetres (2.40 in) of precipitation.

Climate data for Te Hāpua, Northland, 4 m
Month	Jan	Feb	Mar	Apr	May	Jun	Jul	Aug	Sep	Oct	Nov	Dec	Year
Mean daily maximum °C (°F)	24.4 (75.9)	24.9 (76.8)	23.4 (74.1)	21.4 (70.5)	19.1 (66.4)	17.1 (62.8)	16.4 (61.5)	16.5 (61.7)	17.5 (63.5)	18.7 (65.7)	20.3 (68.5)	22.5 (72.5)	20.2 (68.4)
Daily mean °C (°F)	20.3 (68.5)	20.7 (69.3)	19.4 (66.9)	17.6 (63.7)	15.4 (59.7)	13.6 (56.5)	12.9 (55.2)	12.9 (55.2)	13.9 (57.0)	15.1 (59.2)	16.7 (62.1)	18.5 (65.3)	16.4 (61.5)
Mean daily minimum °C (°F)	16.2 (61.2)	16.5 (61.7)	15.4 (59.7)	13.9 (57.0)	11.8 (53.2)	10.1 (50.2)	9.4 (48.9)	9.3 (48.7)	10.3 (50.5)	11.6 (52.9)	13.1 (55.6)	14.6 (58.3)	12.7 (54.9)
Average precipitation mm (inches)	61.0 (2.40)	65.0 (2.56)	75.0 (2.95)	95.0 (3.74)	85.0 (3.35)	115.0 (4.53)	116.0 (4.57)	107.0 (4.21)	88.0 (3.46)	66.0 (2.60)	63.0 (2.48)	62.0 (2.44)	998.0 (39.29)
Source: Climate-data.org

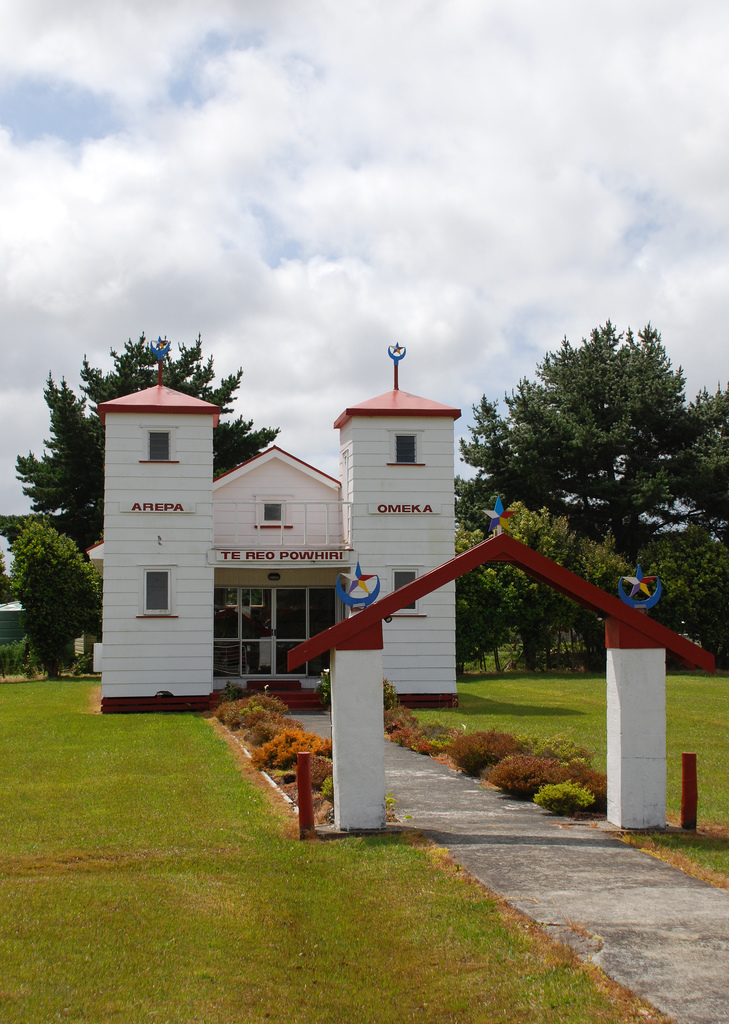
Ratana church at Te Hāpua
