= 2008 Qantas Film and Television Awards =

- Awarded for: Excellence in New Zealand film, television and television journalism
- Sponsored by: Qantas
- Date: 13 September 2008
- Location: Civic Theatre, Auckland
- Country: New Zealand
- Presented by: New Zealand Television Broadcasters Council and the Screen Directors Guild of New Zealand
- First award: 2005

The 2008 Qantas Film and Television Awards were held on Saturday 13 September 2008 at the Civic Theatre in Auckland. For the first time, the craft awards were presented separately to the rest of the awards, at an earlier luncheon ceremony at the Civic Wintergarden, Auckland, on Friday 12 September 2008.

== Nominees and winners ==
Winners are listed first and highlighted in boldface.

Key
† – Non-technical award
‡ – Technical award

=== News and current affairs ===
| Best News † | Best News or Current Affairs Presenter † |
|---|---|
| Sponsored by Qantas: **One News, (TV One)**; 3 News, (TV3); Tonight, (TV One) | **Mark Sainsbury, Close Up (TV One)**; John Campbell, Campbell Live (TV3); Kevin Milne Fair Go (TV One) |
| Best News Reporting † | Best Current Affairs Reporting for a weekly programme or one off current affairs special † |
| **Lisa Owen, One News "Loan" (TV One)**; Lisa Owen, One News "Drugs" (TV One); Duncan Garner, 3 News "Col Selwyn Heaton" (TV3) | **Sarah Hall, 60 Minutes "Suicide For Sale" (TV3)**; Janet McIntyre, Sunday "Silent Night" (TV One); Mike Valintine, Sunday "The Confession" (TV One) |
| Best Current Affairs Reporting for a daily programme † | Best Current Affairs Series † |
| **Robyn Janes, Close Up "Jamie" (TV One)**; Robyn Janes, Close Up "Tongue" (TV One); John Sellwood, Close Up "Cancer" (TV One) | **Sunday episode 33 (TV One)**; 60 Minutes episode 11 (TV3); Close Up "Elim School Tragedy" (TV One) |
| Investigation of the Year † | Best News Camera ‡ |
| **Mike Valintine and Hunter Wells, Sunday "The Confession" (TV One)**; Haydn Jones, One News "Immigration" (TV One); Lisa Owen, One News "P Sting" (TV One) | **Jared Mason, One News and Close Up "Protest" and "Boys School" (TV One)**; Christopher Brown, One News and Close Up "Nepal" (TV One); Kerran J Madden, Close Up "Castle Hill" (TV One) |
| Best Current Affairs Camera ‡ | Best News and Current Affairs Editing ‡ |
| **George Murahidy, 60 Minutes "Truly, Madly, Deeply" (TV3)**; Martin Anderson, 20/20 "The Fall Guy" (TV2); Mike Dodd, Sunday "Oh My Godwits" (TV One) | **Paul Enticott, 60 Minutes "Make Or Break" (TV3)**; Andrew Gibb, Close Up "Train" (TV One); Nigel McPhee, Sunday "Oh My Godwits" (TV One) |

=== Television ===
| Best Drama Programme † | Best Comedy Programme † |
|---|---|
| Sponsored by Images and Sound: **Outrageous Fortune (TV3)**; Shortland Street (TV2); Ride with the Devil (TV2) | **Eating Media Lunch (TV2)**; Pulp Sport (TV3); bro'Town (TV3) |
| Best Factual Series † | Best Maori Language Programme † |
| **The Big Picture (TV One)**; The Investigator (TV One); Undercover (TV One) | **Children of the Revolution (Māori Television)**; Let My Whakapapa Speak (Māori Television); E tu kahikatea (Māori Television) |
| Best Children's/Youth Programme † | Best Information/Lifestyle Programme † |
| Sponsored by Qantas: **Play It Strange 2007 (C4)**; Amazing Extraordinary Friends (TV2); Zip and Mac (TV2) | **The Gravy, series 1 (TVNZ 6)**; Kiwi Kitchen (TV One); Â TÂTOU TAONGA (Māori Television) |
| Best Entertainment Programme † | Best Sports Broadcast † |
| **Jono's New Show(C4)**; Dare To Win (TV2); Dancing with the Stars (TV One) | **Rugby World Cup 2007 (TV3)**; Heineken Open Tennis Final (TV One); World Hockey Olympic Qualifier 2008 (TV One) |
| Best Format/Reality Series † | Performance by an Actress in General Television † |
| **Sensing Murder Ninox Television Ltd (TV2)**; Hunting Aotearoa, series 3 (Māori Television); New Artland (TVNZ 6) | **Robyn Malcolm, Outrageous Fortune (TV3)**; Toni Potter, Shortland Street (TV2); Lynette Forday, Ride with the Devil (TV2) |
| Performance by a Supporting Actress in General Television † | Performance by an Actor in General Television † |
| **Antonia Prebble, Outrageous Fortune (TV3)**; Siobhan Marshall, Outrageous Fortune (TV3); Angela Bloomfield, Ride with the Devil (TV2) | **Antony Starr, Outrageous Fortune (TV3)**; Michael Galvin, Shortland Street (TV2); Erik Thomson, The Million Dollar Conman (TV3) |
| Performance by a Supporting Actor in General Television † | Best Presenter Entertainment/Factual Programme † |
| **Tammy Davis, Outrageous Fortune (TV3)**; Kirk Torrance, Outrageous Fortune (TV3); Johnny Barker, Shortland Street (TV2) | **Jason Gunn, Dancing with the Stars (TV One)**; Hamish Keith, The Big Picture (TV One); Petra Bagust, What's Really in Our Food? (TV3) |
| Best Script – Drama/Comedy Programme † | Achievement in Directing – Drama/Comedy Programme † |
| **Rachel Lang, Outrageous Fortune (TV3)**; James Griffin and Jan Prettejohns, Outrageous Fortune (TV3); Oscar Kightley, Mario Gaoa, David Fane, Shimpal Lelisi and Elizabeth Mitchellbro'Town (TV3) | **Mark Beesley, Outrageous Fortune (TV3)**; Britta Johnstone, Outrageous Fortune (TV3); Simon Bennett, Outrageous Fortune (TV3) |
| Achievement in Directing – Factual/Entertainment Programme † | Best Documentary † |
| **Bryan Bruce, The Investigator (TV One)**; John Bates and Rupert Mackenzie, Beyond the Darklands (TV One); Phil England, The Gravy series one (TVNZ 6) | Sponsored by NZ On Air: **Annie Goldson, An Island Calling (TV3)**; Megan Jones and Justin Pemberton, The Nuclear Comeback (TV One); David Lomas and Jill Graham, The Wahine Disaster (TV One) |
| Achievement in Directing – Documentary † | Sony Achievement in Camera Work – Drama/Comedy Programme ‡ |
| **Justin Pemberton, The Nuclear Comeback (TV One)**; Annie Goldson, An Island Calling (TV3); Jill Graham, The Wahine Disaster (TV One) | **Dave Garbett, Ride with the Devil (TV2)**; Martin Smith, Outrageous Fortune (TV3); Dave Cameron, Amazing Extraordinary Friends (TV2) |
| Achievement in Editing – Drama/Comedy Programme ‡ | Achievement in Original Music in General Television ‡ |
| **Bryan Shaw, Outrageous Fortune (TV3)**; Rowan McKay, Shortland Street (TV2); Lisa Hough, Ride with the Devil (TV2) | **Christian Biegai, Riki Gooch and Dave Whitehead, The Big Picture (TV One)**; Matt Aickin, Sensing murder (TV2); Plan Nine, Lovely Rita (TV One) |
| Achievement in Sound Design in General Television ‡ | Achievement in Production Design in General Television ‡ |
| **Don Paulin and Ian Leslie, The Killian Curse, series 2 (TV2)**; Matt Aickin, Sensing murder (TV2); Images & Sound, Amazing Extraordinary Friends (TV2) | **Ant Sang, bro'Town (TV3)**; Clayton Ercolano, Outrageous Fortune(TV3); Josh Thomas, Shortland Street (TV2) |
| Contribution to Design in General Television ‡ | Achievement in Camerawork – Documentary/Factual Programme ‡ |
| **Claire Palmer, Dancing with the Stars (TV One)**; Katrina Hodge, Outrageous Fortune (TV3); Euan Frizell, A Tall Long Faced Tale (TV One) | **Wayne Vinten, An Island Calling (TV3)**; David Paul, Undercover (TV One); Richard Curtis, Hunting Aotearoa (Māori Television) |
| Achievement in Editing – Documentary/Factual Programme ‡ | |
| **Bryan Shaw, The Wahine Disaster (TV One)**; Tibor RidderingUnder Investigation – Medical Mysteries (TV One); Gaylene Preston, Lovely Rita – Lala Rolls (TV One) | |

=== Film ===
| Best Picture – Budget over $1 Million † | Best Picture – Budget under $1 Million † |
|---|---|
| Sponsored by Qantas: **Out of the Blue**; Perfect Creature; Eagle vs Shark | **A Song of Good**; Jinx Sister; Rubbings from a Live Man |
| Achievement in Directing in Film (budget under and over $1 million) † | Best Performance by an Actor in a leading role in Film † |
| **Taika Waititi, Eagle vs Shark**; Robert Sarkies, Out of the Blue; Vincent Ward, Rain of the Children | **Matthew Sunderland, Out of the Blue**; Erik Thomson, We're Here To Help; Gareth Reeves, A Song of Good |
| Performance by an Actress in a leading role in Film † | Performance by an Actor in a supporting role in Film † |
| Sponsored by Jameson Irish Whiskey: **Geraldine Brophy, Second Hand Wedding**; Miriama Smith, We're Here To Help; Sara Wiseman, Jinx Sister | **Karl Urban, Out of the Blue**; Ian Mune, A Song of Good; David Fane, The Tattooist |
| Performance by an Actress in a supporting role in Film † | Best Screenplay in Film † |
| **Holly Shanahan, Second-Hand Wedding**; Rachel Nash, Jinx Sister; Tandi Wright, Out of the Blue | **Graeme Tetley and Robert Sarkies, Out of the Blue**; Glen Standring, Perfect Creature; Taika Waititi, Eagle vs Shark |
| Best Short Film † | Performance in a Short Film † |
| Sponsored by Images and Sound: **Christopher Dudman, The Graffiti of Mr Tupaia**; Katie Wolfe, This Is Her; Leo Woodhead, Cargo | **Rawiri Paratene, The Graffiti of Mr Tupaia**; Mia Blake, This Is Her; Jaroslav Horvath, Cargo |
| Best Screenplay for a Short Film † | Achievement in Cinematography ‡ |
| Sponsored by Atomic Coffee Roasters: **Paul Stanley Ward, The Graffiti of Mr Tupaia**; Kate McDermott, This Is Her; Rosanne Liang, Take 3 | **Greig Fraser, Out of the Blue**; Richard Bluck, Black Sheep; Adam Clark, Leon Narbey and Alun Bollinger, Rain of the Children |
| Achievement in Editing in Film ‡ | Achievement in Original Music in Film ‡ |
| **Annie Collins, Out of the Blue**; Mike Horton, Second-Hand Wedding; Chris Plummer, Black Sheep | **John Gibson and Jack Body, Rain of the Children**; Peter Scholes, The Tattooist; Victoria Kelly, Black Sheep |
| Achievement in Sound Design in Film ‡ | Achievement in Production Design in Film ‡ |
| **Tim Prebble, Black Sheep**; Dave Whitehead, Out of the Blue; Hayden Collow, Dick Reade and Mike Hedges, Rain of the Children | **Phil Ivey, Perfect Creature**; Phil Ivey, Out of the Blue; Brad Mill, Second-Hand Wedding |
| Achievement in Costume Design in Film ‡ | Achievement in Make-Up Design in Film ‡ |
| **Kirsty Cameron, Perfect Creature**; Lesley Burkes-Harding, Out of the Blue; Bob Buck, Gavin McLean, Pauline Bowkett and Glenn (Kimikimi) Mane, Rain of the Children | **Dave Elsey, Black Sheep**; Deb Watson, The Tattooist |
| Outstanding Technical Contribution in Film – budget under $1 million ‡ | Outstanding Technical Contribution to a Short Film ‡ |
| **Ginny Loane, A Song of Good**; Christopher Pryor, Rubbings From a Live Man; Ashley Turner, A Song of Good | **Ginny Loane, This Is Her**; Matt Holland, Eel Girl; Martin Preiss, Cargo |
