= Georgia Fabish =

New Zealand actress

- Born: January 31, 1994 (age 31); Lower Hutt
- Occupation: Actress

Georgia Fabish (born 31 January 1994, Wellington, New Zealand) is a New Zealand actress. She played in teen television series The Killian Curse and Paradise Café as well as appearing in Out of the Blue, a film depicting the 1990 Aramoana massacre in which a lone gunman murdered 13 people. She was nominated in the Best Supporting Actress category of the Qantas Film Awards for her role in Out of the Blue.

== Credits ==
- 2010: Natasha, Paradise Café
- 2008: Shona, Paradise Café
- 2006: Chiquita Holden, Out of the Blue
- 2005-2007: Celia West, The Killian Curse
- 2005: Schoolgirl, Facelift
