= List of Freaky episodes =

Freaky was originally broadcast in 13 half hour blocks with 3 episodes and commercial breaks after each episode.

No.	Title	Original release date
1	"Slide"	14 September 2003
If only Karl hadn't ignored the "out of order" sign on the water slide, maybe he wouldn't have ended up in a prehistoric world being chased by a huge caveman and a nasty dinosaur. And how will he get back?
2	"Lab-Rats"	14 September 2003
After Delwyn falls asleep in detention she wakes to find herself in a crazy maze, running for her life from her teacher and fellow student Burke who seem very keen on eating her.
3	"Radio"	14 September 2003
Having a radio station that plays only what you want to hear would be pretty cool. Winning all the prizes would be even better. But Rachel discovers that having one that also reveals all your hidden secrets isn't quite so fun.
4	"Fridge"	21 September 2003
Evie finds that meeting someone from the 1970s through the other side of her fridge sure is freaky. But when her little brother sees it all what will she do? And why is Mum acting so weird?
5	"Cleaner"	21 September 2003
After Shane accidentally falls asleep in the sick bay at school, he wakes to find he's been locked in for the night. To make matters worse, the freaky janitor is after him with his evil cleaning machine!
6	"Sister"	21 September 2003
Little sisters can be such a pain. Little sisters with superhuman strength and the ability to throw their older brothers through walls are even worse. Will Mum and Dad make it home in time to save Robert from Andrea?
7	"Mirror"	28 September 2003
Imagine your reflection appearing out of the mirror-world and jumping into yours? For Trevor it seems pretty cool... until his reflection turns out to be an evil twin.
8	"Hitcher"	28 September 2003
Picking up hitchhikers while driving at night never seems like a good idea. Especially when the hitchhiker tells creepy ghost stories. Maybe Dad and Michael will have the last laugh when they share a story of their own...
9	"Sitcom"	28 September 2003
A button that gives you hyper reality? Sounds pretty cool. But this button sucks you right into the TV and into the real life of a sitcom. Maybe squeaky clean American living is the best thing after all.
10	"Family"	5 October 2003
When Michelle sees herself on the TV news in a story about a missing girl, she freaks a little. Especially when she's sitting in her own lounge with her family, but are these people really her family? And why is Dad calling her Karen?
11	"Copier"	5 October 2003
Using the photocopier at Mum's work seems easy enough. But when it prints out paper with "help me" written on it, maybe it's better to copy stuff by hand. And who is the creepy dead looking guy lurking around the office?
12	"Costume"	5 October 2003
Sure, wearing a pink superhero costume to a party is pretty embarrassing. But things can become fun when it's a costume with superhero powers... that is until Mum accidentally shrinks your new found power in the wash.
13	"Mail"	12 October 2003
Delivering junk mail can be a real drag. But when you get sucked through the mail slot and into a creepy old lady's house, that is just the worst. Especially when she has nasty plans for you. Just ask Mel!
14	"House"	12 October 2003
All this poor guy did was walk into the kitchen. Why is he suddenly being chased by a vampire, grabbed by his own reflection in the mirror and having the girl from the poster on the wall speak to him in a freaky deep voice?
15	"Principal"	12 October 2003
Joshua has been made principal for the day. Firing teachers and playing games consoles all day is the perfect way to spend your day at school. But the principal isn't the most popular guy at school and things quickly go downhill.
16	"Graveyard"	19 October 2003
Running through a graveyard at night is a scary thing to do. But when evil spirits are chasing you, things become a little more difficult. What is at the end of the graveyard and who would run through it in the dead of night anyway?
17	"Tent"	19 October 2003
Cheapskate Dad just had to buy the worst tent he could find from a secondhand store. But if that's not bad enough, Dean and Jess discover that a mountaineer who died over fifty years ago haunts this tent.
18	"Dice"	19 October 2003
Three kids find a freaky set of dice, which can predict the numbers of anything which is about to happen. But is it a good idea to use these dice to cheat on a maths test?
19	"Homework"	26 October 2003
Bruce finds himself on the chase of his life when the model of the sun from his school science project falls off his bike and proceeds to roll through town. Can he skate fast enough to catch his homework and make it to school on time?
20	"Dummy"	26 October 2003
After rummaging through a local garage sale, Adam buys himself an old ventriloquist's dummy. It all seems pretty cool until it comes to life and not only winds up the school principal at assembly, but also the meanest kid in school.
21	"Ghost"	26 October 2003
Even ghosts have school exams. So if you found one in your house at night would you help him cram the night before and show him the best way to scare kids at night? This kid does!
22	"Photobooth"	2 November 2003
After being lured into a bizarre photo booth at her local mall, Marla discovers that being magically placed on the front of every magazine is not as cool as it seems. Maybe fame is not all it is cracked up to be.
23	"Babysitter"	2 November 2003
Tim and Susan's plan to lock their nasty babysitter in the downstairs cellar backfires when an escaped criminal finds his way into their house. And who is that knocking at the door?
24	"Freak"	2 November 2003
When a new kid named Martin arrives at school wearing a motorcycle helmet, Dennis the meanest bully thinks all his Christmases have all come at once. But when he sees what is under the helmet, he realizes he is not so tough after all.
25	"Trolley"	9 November 2003
Doing the groceries at the supermarket is a job no kid likes. When you get a trolley with a mind of its own it is just plain annoying. Or is this trolley trying to say something? Is it trying to escape? Prepare for one heck of a ride.
26	"Swing"	9 November 2003
Ben and Grace stumble across a creepy house and an even creepier old man. He tells them the story of a kid who lost his life on the swing Ben had been playing on moments earlier. The man suddenly disappears...
27	"Braces"	9 November 2003
Nathan's orthodontist appears to have done him a huge favour when he install laser guns into his braces. Sure he may win the respect of his fellow students but what happens when he meets the smallest and most nerdy kid in school?
28	"Bullies"	16 November 2003
When Hamish pays a visit to "bully central", he learns that the Bully Master is in town and will soon be watching him closely. But who is the Bully Master and how will he know when he's watching him?
29	"Camp"	16 November 2003
Seven kids find themselves in serious trouble while on school camp when the legend of the "Rat Boy" becomes a reality. When it steals their video camera what follows is all caught on tape. This episode was filmed entirely on handheld camera.
30	"Dog"	16 November 2003
Dogs have it so sweet don't they? It is a dog's life after all. But how would you feel living the life of a dog? One guy is about to find out and discover it is not all as easy as it looks.
31	"Fort"	23 November 2003
Two boys discover the hut they have made in the lounge is actually a portal through to the Second World War in 1944. Can they help the Americans escape the battle? And is bringing them back through the house really the best way?
32	"Photo"	23 November 2003
When two girls' holiday beach photos are developed, they discover they're being followed by some creepy guy. When they learn he died forty years ago their holiday turns out to be one they wish they'd never had.
33	"Pioneer"	23 November 2003
Logan, living in the pioneer days, finds his life turned up side down when weird things start happening. Why won't Mum let him outside? Why hasn't he ever seen Dad return from chopping wood? What is his big sister not telling him?
34	"Track"	30 November 2003
When two girls refuse to obey the "keep to the track" signs they find themselves on the craziest and most frightening bush walk they could ever imagine.
35	"Gameshow"	30 November 2003
Dom and Jack sneak away from the class tour of a TV studio and find themselves on the set of a game show which was canned forty years ago. The hosts have risen from the dead and the boys are now playing for their lives.
36	"Fame"	30 November 2003
Being selected for the national basketball team seems like a great idea. But when it happens to Cameron, who is only 13, it all gets a little too much, especially when the game is being broadcast live to the whole country.
37	"Future"	14 December 2003
While out walking, Toni finds a crazy crystal ball which shows herself 30 seconds into the future. It's all a bit of a laugh until she sees herself get involved with a car accident.
38	"Teacher"	14 December 2003
Stephanie finally manages to convince Tom that their relief teacher is, in fact, a vampire. But when all the usual vampire tests fail they are given a surprise they'll never forget.
39	"Elevator"	14 December 2003
Dom and Jack ignore the department store manager's advice to leave because the shop is closing. Big mistake, because the elevator they have just stepped into is unlike any elevator they'll ever see again - if they ever manage to get out.
