= Facelift (TV series) =

- Genre: Satire
- Directed by: Thomas Robins
- Starring: Alan Brunton; Cohen Holloway
- Composer: David Long
- Country of origin: New Zealand
- Original language: English
- No. of series: 4
- No. of episodes: 31

Production
- Executive producer: Dave Gibson
- Producer: Chris Ellis
- Cinematography: David Paul
- Editors: Lala Rolls; Ben Powdrell; Johanna Sanders
- Running time: 20 minutes
- Production companies: Gibson Group; TVNZ Production

Original release
- Network: TV One
- Release: 2 July 2004 – 10 September 2007

Facelift is a half-hour topical comedy show produced for New Zealand's TV One by the Gibson Group.

Drawing on The Gibson Group's extensive experience with a wide range of comedy productions, including Public Eye, Skitz, Telly Laughs, Newsflash and The Semisis, Facelift is a sketch comedy employing live actors in rubber puppet masks. Pulling off the transition from puppet caricatures to human caricatures was a complex and ambitious task. A small group of actors were cast for voice and performance skills. Moulds were then taken of their heads and prosthetic masks created of various New Zealand politicians and celebrities, such as Helen Clark, Don Brash and Kate Hawkesby. New topical characters are periodically introduced.

The fourth series screened from July 2007 to September 2007.

== Characters ==
=== Main characters ===
Helen Clark (played by Darlene Mohekey), the Prime Minister of New Zealand at the time of the show and leader of the Labour Party. Jokes mainly focus on her lack of affectionate behaviour and her relationship with her husband Peter Davis.

Don Brash (played by Alan Brunton), the former leader of the National Party (succeeded by John Key) and Helen's rival in the elections. Jokes focus on his efforts to beat Helen Clark in the elections, his boringness, his relationship with his wife Je Lan, his racism towards Māori people and the various things he has done in order to win votes. The real Don Brash stated that he doesn't mind being parodied by the show.

Winston Peters (played by Cohen Holloway), the leader of the New Zealand First party. Jokes are based on his relationships to Labour and National, his anger against foreign immigrants such as Asians, Muslims (especially Iraqis whom he claims are all terrorists) and any other ethnic minorities, the fact that only elderly people vote for him and his lack of knowledge of the Māori culture, despite being part Māori himself.

Rodney Hide, the leader of the Act party. His face was put on a rat's body at the start of the show, possibly to suggest the fact that he is always 'in the muck'. Muck raking was probably his main comedic attribute, as well as the fact that his party got such few votes in the election.

Jeanette Fitzsimons, the leader of the Green party. Jokes were based on her love for anything to do with nature and spirituality, like reforestation, Feng Shui and in some skits, marijuana. Nándor Tánczos was also parodied in the show.

John Campbell (played by Cohen Holloway), a news anchor for TV3 News in the first series, and the host of Campbell Live in the second and third series. His skits frequently started with a greeting aimed at the younger generation, e.g. "Yo Niggers." He used the expression "Marvellous" frequently and ended most skits with a reference to what Jacquie Brown was going to do "after the break", usually something sexually explicit to parody the fact that Jacquie usually does anything for the show. When John is in trouble he often calls on his assistant Carol Hirschfeld who is never shown but acts like a mother towards him. In the third series there was a joke about him and Rove McManus being homosexual together because the real Campbell frequently interviews Rove whenever he comes to New Zealand.

Paul Holmes featured in the second series presenting his new show on Prime Television New Zealand. Many jokes related to the low ratings of the Holmes show on Prime, such as Paul pausing the show while waiting for a viewer to get back from the kitchen. The show's text message system was also parodied, including one message saying viewers should change channels to watch a lesbian scene on Shortland Street. After the real show was axed in August 2005 Paul Holmes was seen presenting from a garage using cardboard captions.

Kim Hill, the radio interviewer and host of Face to Face with Kim Hill, is shown with vulture-like qualities, long fingernails and feathers on her dress. She interviews politicians and runs investigative stories such as the PaedoFiles, an investigation on a town called Fiddleton that is inhabited by paedophiles.

Kate Hawkesby, a television personality and anchor for One News. She is shown as incredibly vain and with a penchant for bizarre garments.

Ex-sports stars and TV personalities Matthew Ridge and Marc Ellis were parodied, as well as model Nicky Watson (also played by Darlene Mohekey), Matthew's ex-partner. Jokes on Mark and Matthew focused on their frequent stupid behaviour, while Nicky's involved her attempts to convince others that she was a celebrity.

=== Background characters ===
Both Osama bin Laden and Saddam Hussein were parodied by the show. In one episode the lighter side of Osama was shown on a cooking show with Peta Mathias. He breached the Koran by drinking a glass of wine because he'd had "a bastard of a day" and stated that Pita should cover her face, not because she was female but because he wasn't into red-heads with freckles. Osama also featured on Paul Holmes' Prime show, with Osama stating that he wasn't concerned about being captured as no one would be watching. Saddam was shown in one skit as a taxi driver in Auckland, parodying the fact that an Auckland taxi driver was convicted of having worked in Saddam's regime. George W. Bush was also parodied for his actions in the Iraqi war.

Tana Umaga, Graham Henry and the All Blacks rugby union team were parodied. The All Blacks were shown as being much less tough than they appear and were shown doing such things as training to be celebrities on the New Zealand version of Dancing with the Stars (a parody of Norm Hewitt an ex-All Black who appeared on the show), performing a Pakehaka (a portmanteau of the words Pākehā (meaning white person) and Haka (the traditional Māori dance)), and performing a Haka based on all the advertisement funds the All Blacks get. Another recurring skit focused on Welsh rugby journalist Stephen Jones following the games who insulted the All Blacks and New Zealand until being attacked by locals. Ma'a Nonu and Gavin Henson's overuse of make-up, hair products and dye was also parodied.

The New Zealand version of the television show Dancing with the Stars was parodied. Sketches included 'Dancing with the MPs', where Don Brash and Jerry Brownlee did an unprepared dance, Rodney Hide did a 'Flat Tax Limbo', Tame Iti and Nikky Watson did a pole dance and Trevor Mallard did an 'NCEA Side-Step'. There was also a parody involving Schapelle Corby's case and a future version of the show, still hosted by Jason Gunn where Invercargill mayor Tim Shadbolt had finally been voted off and was to do a final dance with his new partner, a walking frame.

Other people and events parodied in the show:

The Schapelle Corby case. One sketch was based on the movie The Castle and another on Dancing with the Stars. There was also a skit with Australian Prime Minister John Howard supporting her innocence (due to her body measurements).

The New Zealand movie Whale Rider twice, the first time with leader of the Māori party Tariana Turia on her quest to get decent status, the second a Japanese version involving the illegal killing of whales.

Suzanne Paul (played by Darlene Mohekey), a television personality, in two sketches. One involved a show called 'Do the Bizzo' with Matthew Ridge with an ego-boost massage machine voiced by Nikki Watson. The second involved another show, 'Who wants to be an Ex-Millionaire,' where she answered questions by Tony Veitch and tried to sell him a vibrating pillow that was really "cheap tacky shit".

Kate Moss on an informercial skit selling the product, 'The Kate Moss Super Sucker', which helped people sniff cocaine.

Māori Television, the Māori Language channel. Skits were based on the 'originality of the channel' showing a line-up of what was coming up next with shows that seemed very familiar to English ones, for example, 'Kuia Eye for the Māori Guy' similar to Queer Eye for the Straight Guy. There was also a documentary, funded at around $2 million by the government, about the Māori history of New Zealand. The money was obviously used for other purposes as the show was filmed with plastic toys on a New Zealand map at Aunty Donna's place (a possible reference to Donna Awatere Huata) in five or so minutes. The show parodied the recent debate over whether or not the Māori people were the first to New Zealand by stating, "…there were some natives here before that, but a giant shark came and ate them". The 'giant shark' excuse was also used about the death of the native birds in New Zealand, such as the Moa and Giant Eagle which were hunted to extinction by Māori.

Donna Awatere Huata and her scandal were conveyed in a skit where she taught an illiterate Māori man how to read.

In series four several new characters entered the show, such as the hosts of TV One's 'Breakfast', more rugby players and National's new leader John Key. Also parodied was 3 News' weather girl Toni Marsh, portrayed as slutty in her word usage when reporting the weather and her style of dress.
