= Blue Murder Motel =

New Zealand television series

- Genre: Comedy drama; Crime drama; Mystery fiction; Whodunnit
- Created by: Kate McDermott; Steven Zanoski
- Country of origin: New Zealand
- Original language: English
- No. of seasons: 1
- No. of episodes: 8

Production
- Executive producers: Philip Smith; Kathleen Anderson
- Producer: Steven Zanoski
- Production locations: Orewa, Hibiscus Coast
- Running time: 8 x 45 minutes
- Production company: Great Southern Studios

Original release
- Network: TVNZ 1
- Release: 18 January 2026

Blue Murder Motel is a New Zealand murder mystery television series which debuted in 2026. The series stars New Zealand actor Michala Banas and Australian actor Brett Tucker, who previously appeared together in the Australian drama series McLeod's Daughters.

== Premise ==
Two married Australian police officers have taken early retirement and have purchased the Blue Motel in New Zealand to run as a business. A series of local murders inspire them to investigate and to help the local, inexperienced, sole-charge police officer solve the crimes.

At the end of the first episode, the advertising display for the motel is tagged by vandals, changing the displayed name from "Blue Motel" to "Blue Murder Motel". A later episode indicates that local residents now refer to it as that.

== Production history ==
In November 2024, NZ On Air announced that it had funded a new commission - Blue Murder Motel - produced by Great Southern Television, and that the production would receive up to $2,800,000 worth of funding. Filming was underway by September 2025.

In April 2026, NZ On Air announced that the series had been renewed for an eight-episode second season. Production was underway by June 2026.

== Setting ==
The series is located in the fictional seaside community of Mōwai Bay, which is described as being "somewhere near Auckland". Filming took place at Orewa on the Hibiscus Coast north of Auckland, as well as in the Bucklands Beach and Eastern Beach areas. Locations included the Edgewater Motel as the Blue Motel, and Ōrewa Beach Holiday Park as the Shady Vista Holiday Park, which was featured in episode 3.

== Cast ==
=== Main ===
- Michala Banas as Vanessa 'Vinny' Coleman
- Brett Tucker as Peter 'Cole' Coleman
- Jayden Daniels as Constable Jamie Haira, a recently graduated sole-charge constable
- Stephanie Tauevihi as Maxine, a permanent guest at the motel
- Jamie McDermott as Saffron, a motel employee

=== Guest ===
- Maaka Pohatu as Devlin (episode 1)
- Craig Hall as Greg (episode 2)
- Aidee Walker as Theresa (episode 3)
- Peter Elliott as Martin (episode 4)
- Fiona Samuel as Pam (episode 4)
- Angela Bloomfield as Sheree (episode 6)
- Sara Wiseman as Detective Annette Grainger (episode 6)
- Christopher Stollery as Burnsie (episodes 7 & 8)
- Miriama Smith as Simona (episode 7)
- Justine Smith as Real Ellen (episode 8)

== Episodes ==
No. overall	No. in series	Title	Directed by	Written by	Original release date
1	1	"Party Boy"	Josh Frizzell	Kate McDermott	18 January 2026
Married ex-cops Vinny and Cole trade Sydney homicide for retirement bliss, running a retro seaside motel in coastal New Zealand—until a boys’ weekend ends with a corpse in Unit 3.
2	2	"A Thousand Dreadful Things"	Lucy Lawless	Kate McDermott	25 January 2026
It’s peak summer and the town swarms with partying teens. When a boy vanishes with his jet ski, Vinny and Cole face a trio of intimidating, entitled girls who are clearly hiding a secret.
3	3	"Home Is Where You Park It"	Josh Frizzell	Paul Jenner	1 February 2026
At the Shady Vista Holiday Park, guest tensions erupt in a fiery murder. Constable Jamie Haira pulls retired ex-cops Vinny and Cole back into sleuthing, derailing their seaside retirement dreams.
4	4	"Born Alone, Die Together"	Jacqueline Nairn	James Griffin	8 February 2026
Beloved locals Maude and Martin are poisoned by their own dinner. As Vinny and Cole investigate, cleaner Saffron and guest Maxine suspect the new motel owners hide secrets.
5	5	"Run For Your Life"	Jacqueline Nairn	Paul Jenner	15 February 2026
A raucous 30th birthday weekend turns deadly when a motel guest is attacked during a fun run. Her sister, a TV ad actress turned trophy wife, bullies Vinnie and Cole into investigating the murder.
6	6	"Cat Among the Pigeons"	Lucy Lawless	Marina Alofagia McCartney and Kate McDermott	22 February 2026
Local councillor Gordon is found dead at home, the only witness his designer cat, now missing. As cat posters flood the town, Vinny and Cole clash with a city detective who wants them off the case.
7	7	"Radio Silence"	Mark Beesley	Kate McDermott	1 March 2026
A summer storm traps holidaymakers in the Blue Motel conference room as a local radio DJ dies mid-broadcast.
8	8	"A Cop and a Gentleman"	Mark Beesley	Kate McDermott	8 March 2026
A summer market turns deadly, when a local candy merchant dies in a freak accident. Vinny and Cole dig deeper and discover it was murder.

== Broadcast ==
The series began broadcasting on TVNZ 1 on 18 January 2026, with catch-up availability on TVNZ's streaming service TVNZ+. The series was made available for streaming on Acorn TV in the summer 2026.
