= Ride with the Devil =

Ride with the Devil may refer to:

- Ride with the Devil (film), a 1999 film directed by Ang Lee
- Ride with the Devil (TV series), a New Zealand drama series
- Ride with the Devil, a 1999 film starring and produced by Scott Shaw
- "Ride with the Devil", a song composed by The Gun
