= Michala Banas =

New Zealand actor and singer (born 1978)

- Born: Michala Elizabeth Laurinda Banas; 14 November 1978 (age 48); Wellington, New Zealand
- Occupations: Actress; Singer; Director
- Years active: 1985–present
- Known for: Always Greener; McLeod's Daughters
- Spouse(s): Kade Greenland (m. 2014; div. 2014) Toby Truslove (m. 2019)
- Family: John Banas (father)

Michala Elizabeth Laurinda Banas (born 14 November 1978) is a New Zealand television actress and singer. She is best known for her roles as Marissa Taylor in Always Greener and as Kate Manfredi in McLeod's Daughters.

== Early life ==
Banas was born in Wellington, New Zealand, one of three children, including brothers Leon and Alexis, to award-winning screenwriter and director John Banas, who has written scripts for series such as Blue Heelers and Water Rats. She is of New Zealand, English, Scottish and German descent.

Banas starred in her first television advertisement at only 18 months of age, playing the part of a kiwi in a Labour Party election campaign ad. She became interested in acting at a young age, when her father took her to theatre rehearsals with him. She also studied ballet for a short period, and took piano lessons from a cabaret singer, learning to play by ear.

Banas moved to Australia with her family at age 10, when her father decided to seek directing work there. She undertook her final two years of high school at a private girls' school in Queensland. She decided not to attend university, opting instead to move to Melbourne to pursue acting as a career.

== Career ==
Banas' first film performance was at the age of five, in 1986 New Zealand action film Dangerous Orphans. She made her Australian debut as Louisa Iredale in the miniseries Mirror, Mirror in 1995, which saw her nominated for Best Young Actress at the New Zealand Television Awards in 1996.

After guesting in several television series, including Good Guys, Bad Guys, State Coroner, Murder Call, and Blue Heelers, Banas played recurring roles in 2000 as Ariel in children's comedy series Round the Twist and Angela O'Connor in Something in the Air. After five years in Melbourne, she relocated to Sydney when she landed her first major role as rebellious teenager Marissa Taylor in Seven Network drama series Always Greener in 2001, alongside John Howard and Anne Tenney. She played the role for two seasons until the show's cancellation in 2003. During this time, she also had a small role in the 2002 film adaptation of Scooby-Doo, featuring Sarah Michelle Gellar and Freddie Prinze Jr.

Banas is an accomplished singer, and in 2003 released a country-pop single, "Kissin' The Wind", written by Meredith Brooks, which made the top 30 on the Australian Recording Industry Association singles chart.

In 2004, Banas joined the cast of McLeod's Daughters as the character Kate Manfredi, former school friend of Jodi Fountain McLeod, why began working as a farmhand. She played the role until 2008, choosing to leave the series just before it was announced that it would be the show's last season. From November 2008, with only two days notice, she then took over the role of Libby Kennedy on the Australian soap opera Neighbours for a five-week period, after Kym Valentine was forced to take a temporary break due to illness.

In 2009, Banas filled in for Fox FM's Jo Stanley on The Matt and Jo Show, while Stanley was on maternity leave. Banas made her stage debut in the Broadway musical comedy Avenue Q in 2009, her performance earning her a Helpmann Award, She has since starred on stage in several productions for Melbourne Theatre Company (MTC) and is the co-artistic director of independent theatre company The KIN Collective. Banas was one of three celebrity faces endorsing Proactiv skincare in Australia and New Zealand.

From 2011 to 2012, Banas had a recurring guest role as Tiffany Turner on the drama series Winners & Losers and a supporting role in ABC3 teen drama Nowhere Boys as Phoebe. In 2012, she appeared alongside Lachy Hulme and Shane Jacobson as Carolyn Russell in 2012 TV movie Beaconsfield, the true story of the Beaconsfield Mine collapse. The following year, she began a three-season run, starring opposite Robyn Nevin as Amber Wheeler in ABC comedy series Upper Middle Bogan.

From 2014 to 2015, Banas appeared on the panel for several episodes of comedy game show Have You Been Paying Attention?

In 2019, Banas played the role of Jesse in drama miniseries Bad Mothers, alongside Melissa George, Mandy McElhinney and Jessica Tovey. That same year, she trained as an Intimacy Coordinator in the UK under Ita O'Brien, after which time she began working in the field for screen and stage projects. At this time, she was one of only three Intimacy Coordinators working in Australian film and television. In June 2019, it was announced that Banas would appear in the sitcom Fam Time, which was originally intended to broadcast on the Seven Network in 2020. The series, however, was indefinitely shelved until June 2024, when it was announced it would be released on 7plus on 11 July 2024. She played the role of Belinda Box.

In 2020, Banas joined the cast of Halifax: Retribution, the miniseries reboot of 90s drama series Halifax f.p., appearing alongside Rebecca Gibney, as Detective Erin Riley, who returns to work after taking time out to have a child. That same year, she played the role of Pearl in children's series Larry the Wonderpup.

After an appearance in 2022 miniseries Joe vs. Carole, based on the story of Joe Exotic and Carole Baskin of Tiger King fame, Banas appeared in ABC's teen drama miniseries Turn Up the Volume and western comedy miniseries Gold Diggers, both in 2023. She then joined broadcaster Jo Stanley in the women-led radio station Broad Radio, as a co-host, on 23 September 2024.

In 2025, Banas had a role opposite Liam Neeson in action adventure film Ice Road: Vengeance. She also wrote and starred alongside her father in short film Packed Away, which also marked her directorial debut. The film screened at St Kilda Short Film Festival and Flickerfest and was a finalist for Best Short Film in the 2025 CinefestOZ Short Film Competition. That same year, she was named as co-lead in new New Zealand crime series Blue Murder Motel. The series, which premiered in March 2026, saw her reunited with former Neighbours and McLeod's Daughters on-screen partner Brett Tucker, playing detective spouse duo, Vanessa 'Vinny' and Peter 'Cole' Coleman, respectively.

== Personal life ==
Banas married Kade Greenland in January 2014 after dating for two years, but the pair split in December of the same year, after being married for only 11 months.

After dating for three-and-a-half years, Banas married actor Toby Truslove in June 2019, eloping in New York's Central Park. The pair had not previously announced their engagement publicly.

Banas is an ambassador for Kidney Health Australia. As a child, she suffered from recurrent urinary tract infections for the first six years of her life, after which doctors discovered she had been born with a kidney defect. She subsequently had her left kidney removed.

Banas became an Australian citizen in 2024. Her father, screenwriter and director John Banas, unexpectedly died at the end of 2025.

== Filmography ==
=== Film ===
Year	Title	Role	Notes	Ref
1985	Dangerous Orphans	Anna Hanna		
2002	Scooby-Doo	Carol		
2003	Ned	Muffy		
2009	Eeny Meeny Miny Moe	Self	Short film	
2010	The Colours of Home	Karen	Short film	
2013	Half Way	Chantelle	Short film	
2015	Sweatshop	Tina DiMasio	Short film	
2016	Nowhere Boys: The Book of Shadows	Phoebe		
2016	Limited Time Only	Karen	Short film	
2017	Speaking Daggers	Isabella	Short film	
2017	Superheroes	Olivia	Animated short film	
2018	That's Not My Dog!	Michala		
2018	For Your Sins	Jonnie	Short film	
2019	The Show Must Go On	Self	Documentary film Also associate producer / story consultant	
2020	Hopscotch	Sarah	Short film	
2020	The Test	Jo	Short film	
2021	Breathe	Claudia	Short film	
2023	Run Rabbit Run	Alice Breaths		
2023	Teach Me How to Cry	Alex	Short film	
2023	Ashes	Tanya	Short film	
2025	Ice Road: Vengeance	V.A. Psychiatrist		
2026	Packed Away	Em	Short film Also director / writer / executive producer	

=== Television ===
Year	Title	Role	Notes	Ref
1995	Mirror, Mirror	Louisa Iredale	Regular role	
1998	State Coroner	Zoe Martin	2 episodes	
1998	Good Guys, Bad Guys	Kirsty	1 episode	
1999	Murder Call	Kylie McDonald	Episode: "Cut & Dried"	
1999	Flipper	Karen	Episode: "Spring Break"	
1999	Blue Heelers	Tara Bruckner	Episode: "Winning at All Costs"	
2000	Blue Heelers	Michaela Brady	Episode: "Leg Work"	
2000	The Lost World	Renata	Episode: "Unnatural Selection"	
2000–2001	Something in the Air	Angela O'Connor	11 episodes	
2001	The Saddle Club	Shoshonna Greene	Episode: "Star Quality"	
2001	Round the Twist	Ariel	Regular role	
2001	BeastMaster	Loriel	Episode: "Mydoro"	
2001–2003	Always Greener	Marissa Taylor	Main role	
2004–2008	McLeod's Daughters	Kate Manfredi	Main role (seasons 4–8)	
2008	The Mansion	Megan McKean	1 episode	
2008	Neighbours	Libby Kennedy	18 episodes	
2011–2016	Winners & Losers	Tiffany Turner	16 episodes	
2012	Beaconsfield	Carolyn Russell	TV movie	
2013–2015	Nowhere Boys	Phoebe	Recurring role (seasons 1–2)	
2013–2016	Upper Middle Bogan	Amber Wheeler	Main role	
2014	Party Tricks	Tanya Keegan	1 episode	
2014	Sam Fox: Extreme Adventures	Cooper	1 episode	
2015	Miss Fisher's Murder Mysteries	Enid Shannon	1 episode	
2016	The Doctor Blake Mysteries	Joyce Ellis	1 episode	
2016	Luke Warm Sex	HPV	1 episode	
2015; 2017	Shakespeare Republic	Phebe / Hamlet	Web series, 2 episodes	
2018	True Story with Hamish & Andy	Faye	1 episode	
2019	Get Krack!n	Rose Bailey	1 episode	
2019	Bad Mothers	Jesse	4 episodes	
2020	Halifax: Retribution	Erin	Miniseries, 4 episodes	
2020	Larry the Wonderpup	Pearl	8 episodes	
2020	AussieWood	Jimmy Morricone		
2021	Ms Fisher's Modern Murder Mysteries	Pauline Moore	1 episode	
2022	Joe vs. Carole	Dr. Hernandez	Miniseries, 1 episode	
2023	Turn Up the Volume	Mish	Miniseries, 5 episodes	
2023	Gold Diggers	Tippy	Miniseries, 6 episodes	
2023–2024	Spooky Files	Olympia Papadimitriou	3 episodes	
2024	Fam Time	Belinda Box	6 episodes	
2024	A Remarkable Place to Die	Kylie Shorrock	1 episode	
2026	Blue Murder Motel	Vanessa 'Vinny' Coleman	8 episodes	
TBA	Till the Boys Come Home	Katherine	In development	

== Radio ==
Year	Title	Role	Notes	Ref
2024–present	Broad Radio	Self / Co-Host		

== Theatre ==
=== As performer ===
Year	Title	Role	Notes	Ref
2009–2010	Avenue Q	Kate Monster / Lucy T Slut	Australian national tour	
2013	The Haunting of Daniel Gartrell	Daughter	Lismore City Hall with NORPA	
2015	Birdland	Annalisa / Luc / Claudie / DC Richer	Southbank Theatre, Melbourne with MTC	
2016	The Odd Couple	Gwendolyn Pigeon	MTC	
2018	Lottie in the Late Afternoon	Clara	Fortyfivedownstairs, Melbourne with KIN Collective	
2018	Funny Girl The Musical in Concert	Fanny Brice	Sydney Opera House	
2021	The Truth	Laurence	Southbank Theatre, Melbourne with MTC	
2021	Boy Swallows Universe	Frankie Bell	QPAC, Brisbane with Queensland Theatre Company	
2023	The Memory of Water	Mary	Ensemble Theatre, Sydney	
2024	Love Stories	Wife	QPAC, Brisbane for Brisbane Festival	
2026	Losing Face	Jo	Southbank Theatre, Melbourne with MTC	

=== As intimacy coordinator ===
Year	Title	Role	Notes	Ref
2020	Emerald City	Intimacy coordinator	QPAC, Brisbane with MTC & QTC	
2021	Sexual Misconduct of the Middle Classes	Intimacy Coordinator	Southbank Theatre, Melbourne, Belvoir St Theatre, Sydney & online with MTC	
2025	Honour	Intimacy Consultant	Red Stitch Actors Theatre, Melbourne	

== Discography ==
=== Singles ===
List of singles, with selected chart positions
Title	Year	Peak chart positions
Title	Year	AUS
"Kissin' the Wind"	2003	28

== Awards and nominations ==
Year	Work	Award	Category	Result	Ref
1996	Mirror, Mirror	New Zealand Television Awards	Best Young Actress Award	Nominated	
2002	Always Greener	Logie Awards	Most Popular New Female Talent	Nominated	
2010	Avenue Q	Helpmann Awards	Best Lead Female in a Musical	Won	
2014	The Beauty Queen of Leenane	Green Room Awards	Best Ensemble	Nominated	
2014	Upper Middle Bogan	Equity Ensemble Awards	Most Outstanding Ensemble in Comedy Series	Won	
2015	Upper Middle Bogan	Equity Ensemble Awards	Most Outstanding Ensemble in Comedy Series	Nominated	
2016	Shakespeare Republic	London Short Series Fest	Best Actress	Nominated	
2017	Upper Middle Bogan	Dublin Web Festival Awards	Best Actress in a Comedy	Nominated	
2017	Upper Middle Bogan	Equity Ensemble Awards	Most Outstanding Ensemble in Comedy Series	Nominated	
2017	Shakespeare Republic	Bilbao Seriesland Festival	Best Ensemble	Won	
2018	Shakespeare Republic	Web Series Festival	Best Ensemble Cast	Nominated	
2018	Shakespeare Republic	New Jersey Web Festival	Best Ensemble	Nominated	
2019	Shakespeare Republic	London International Motion Picture Awards	Best Ensemble	Won	
2025	Packed Away	CinefestOZ	Best Short Film	Finalist	
