= A Song of Good =

- Directed by: Gregory King
- Written by: Gregory King
- Produced by: Mark Foster
- Starring: Gareth Reeves; Ian Mune; Danielle Cormack
- Cinematography: Ginny Loane
- Edited by: Jonathan Venz
- Music by: Dylan Wood
- Release date: August 29, 2008
- Running time: 82 min
- Country: New Zealand
- Language: English

A Song of Good is a 2008 New Zealand film written and directed by Gregory King. It premiered at the Rotterdam International Film Festival on 29th January and was released online for free on 16 February 2009 before being released on DVD.

== Cast ==
- Gareth Reeves as Gary Cradle
- Matthew Sunderland as Denis
- Ian Mune as Ron Cradle
- Danielle Cormack as Rachel Cradle
- Jonathon Hendry as Glen
- Caleb Griffiths as Laughlin Cradle
- Darien Takle as June Eskleson
- Jarod Rawiri as Howie

== Reception ==
Russell Edwards in Variety said "While some fests may express interest because of pic’s pedigree, awkward combo of potent violence and frequently ineffectual humor is unlikely to duplicate the international success of more innocuous Kiwi film “Eagle vs. Shark,” despite sharing a similarly dry wit."

Stuff's Graeme Tuckett said King "has put together a contentious, troubling, tough-minded and horribly funny little slice of a Kiwi reality that we see plenty of on the six o'clock news, but have never before seen on the big screen."

Peter Malone says the "In many ways this is quite a conventional film, a small-budget, short running time film showing a New Zealand suburban slice of life. Beginning symbolically, with the central character, Gary, seemingly drowning, it shows Gary’s decline into the depths – and further.".

== Awards ==
2008 Qantas Film and Television Awards

- Best Picture – Budget under $1 Million - Mark Foster and Gregory King - won
- Outstanding Technical Contribution in Film – budget under $1 million - Ginny Loane (Cinematographer) - won
- Best Performance by an Actor in a leading role in Film - Gareth Reeves - nominated
- Performance by an Actor in a supporting role in Film - Ian Mune - nominated
- Outstanding Technical Contribution in Film – budget under $1 million - Ashley Turner (Production Designer) - nominated
