= The Cult (TV series) =

- Genre: Drama, Thriller
- Created by: Kathryn Burnett; Peter Cox
- Developed by: Great Southern Television
- Written by: Peter Cox; David Brechin-Smith
- Directed by: Peter Burger; Charlie Haskell; Michael Duignan
- Starring: Renato Bartolomei; Latham Gaines; Danielle Cormack; Lisa Chappell; Kate Elliott
- Composer: Rhian Sheehan
- Country of origin: New Zealand
- Original language: English
- No. of seasons: 1
- No. of episodes: 13

Production
- Executive producer: Philip Smith
- Producer: Rachel Gardner
- Camera setup: Red Digital
- Running time: 40 – 50 minutes

Original release
- Network: TV2
- Release: 24 September – 10 December 2009

The Cult is a New Zealand serial drama television series in which a group of people try to rescue their loved ones from a mysterious cult called Two Gardens.

The Cult held the 8:30-9:30 spot on TV2 in New Zealand. The series debuted in New Zealand on 24 September 2009 and finished with a 2-hour season finale on 10 December . It was airing on Polish and Portuguese television in 2011, and commenced screening on Australian television from December 2012.

== Plot ==
A few years prior to the starting of the series, a number of people disappeared, later turning up in a mysterious compound, known as "Two Gardens". Amongst these people were Ryan Lewis, Andy Wills and Jenni Seger. Years later, another group of people, the relatives of Ryan, Andy and Jenni, receive pictures of their loved ones in "Two Gardens". They each learn of the fellow liberators seeking to find their loved ones and decide to band together to rescue the trio and the great mystery surrounding their disappearance...

Situated several kilometres away from the compound, the liberators meet at a nearby lodge, known as "The Glen" - Michael Lewis who is looking for his sons Ryan and Nathan, Andy's wife Gina Delaney and sister Annabelle, British couple Harris and Frances Seger the parents of Jenni, accompanied by their assistant heavyweight, Hugo and Daniel, another Brit looking for his girlfriend Hannah.

During a ride with Michael Lewis, Daniel disappears in the car crash, leading Michael and the other liberators to believe that he'd been kidnapped. The Liberators find out that the cult Two Gardens is being led by a man named Edward North, and that it is their loved ones' choice to stay there. After breaking into Two Gardens, in a quest to rescue their loved ones, they find a missing Jenni, (who was being looked after by a man who lived in the forest) and later, Michael's son, Nathan.

After finding Jenni, they realise something isn't right with her, as she appears to be in an unresponsive and trance-like state and appears to have Heterochromia in her right eye, something she didn't have before. In order to try to find out what is going on in Two Gardens, they manage to kidnap the resident doctor, Cynthia Ross, with very limited success. The doctor refuses to reveal what she knows, leading eventually to Harris and Frances begging new accomplice and apparent 'de-programmer' Sophie to torture Cynthia for the information they so desperately need.

During the night, Jenni is taken back to Two Gardens and the next day, during Cynthia's escape, Hugo is shot. Gina, attempting to get Andy back, is kidnapped but is told by Edward that they share something, but he won't tell her what. He does decide to let her see Andy, who it is revealed, has cancer and is slowly dying because of this. Hannah decides to tell Edward she is pregnant with Ryan's baby. However, under orders from Edward, Cynthia poisons the water supply in the well to make it look like Gina did it. Gina watches as Andy gives into the cancer and dies. After she is freed she tells everyone that Andy is dead. Andy is the taken to the "white room" where his left eye is injected with something and he is stabbed in the stomach, showing his "revival".

From here on we see flashbacks of the characters' pasts. Gina tries to save a woman from her violent boyfriend but is thrown in front of a car for "interfering", leaving her dead for 44 minutes. Michael, suffering an aneurysm and Frances also, it is revealed, die for exactly 44 Minutes. Edward, who it appears has discovered these coincidences, begins to believe that they will lead this world into an era of peace and wants to bring them together. We learn Sophie is a highly skilled cult de-programmer and mother of one, whose young daughter is later kidnapped and presumed dead. On the surface, Sophie appears to ally herself with the Liberators, however a darker side is revealed (unbeknownst to the Liberators), and it is likely that Sophie is seeking revenge for her missing daughter. It is at this point that Sophie can be seen working with a group of people who don't want "The Commencement" (what Edward wishes to happen) to go ahead.

Towards the end of the series, we learn Edward, along with Daniel, also died for 44 minutes and this event brings them together, leading to the establishment of Two Gardens. Edward's plan for "The Commencement" is almost complete, and he works with Sophie to kidnap all Liberators and bring them to Two Gardens. Upon returning to spot where the friends were kidnapped, Michael gets a call from Daniel who claims he escaped from Two Gardens, and asks him to meet back at "The Glen". Upon returning to the Glen with Sophie, they catch him out lying, and manage to knock him out then go to his motel to find out what's going on.

In Daniel's motel room, Michael and Sophie discover are folders of all those who died for 44 minutes, along with the startling revelation that it appeared to have happened on the same day and that it seems as though they were "Chosen" for something. Daniel then wakes up. Michael is disbelieving of Daniel's claims but Daniel does tell him that Edward is a loose cannon and that the people of Two Gardens, including Ryan, are in grave danger. Daniel exposes Sophie's lies to Michael and he's forced to side with Daniel and go into Two Gardens to try to stop Edward and The Commencement before it's too late.

Meanwhile, the group working with Sophie turns out to be an anti-cult group, and with plans to wipe out everyone at Two Gardens. Once inside, in a desperate attempt to save Ryan, Annabelle is fatally shot, with Cynthia unable to save her. Cynthia makes her escape with Hannah, her latest test subject. With it all over, and everyone finally free of Two Gardens, Daniel comes in and tells a saddened Edward that he, Daniel, now has Michael. The anti-cult group walks in, and Daniel tells them that Edward is all theirs.

== Cast and characters ==
The Cult

- Latham Gaines plays Edward North, charismatic leader of Two Gardens
- Scott Wills plays Saul, head of security
- Danielle Cormack plays Cynthia Ross, the cult's doctor
- Gareth Reeves plays Ryan Lewis, Michael Lewis' eldest son
- Dwayne Cameron plays Nathan Lewis, Michael Lewis' other son
- Chelsie Preston Crayford plays Hannah
- Kip Chapman plays Andy Wills
- Bodelle de Ronde plays Jenni Seger

The Liberators

- 'Renato Bartolomei plays Michael Lewis, successful defence lawyer looking for this two sons
- Lisa Chappell plays Sophie McIntyre, cult deprogrammer hired by the liberators
- Andy Grainger plays Harris Seger, UK psychologist looking for his adopted daughter Jenni
- Rachel Nash plays Frances Seger, Harris' wife
- Kate Elliott plays Gina Delaney, reformed party girl looking for her husband Andy
- Sara Wiseman plays Annabelle Wills, also looking for Andy who is her brother
- Will Wallace plays Hugo, the liberator's 'muscle', ex SAS

== Episodes ==
No.	Title	Directed by	Written by	Original release date
1	"The Calling"	Peter Burger	Written by : Peter Cox & David Brechin-Smith; Story by : Peter Cox, David Brechin-Smith, Kathryn Burnett & Nick Ward	24 September 2009
Family members (Michael, Francis and Gina) of cult members each receive a photograph of their family member in Two Gardens and a letter directing them to an online chat room where they make contact with each other. They, along with Daniel, Harris, Annabelle and Hugo, rent a house near the Two Gardens complex and begin inspecting the compound. Michael and Daniel drive around Two Gardens, and Michael realises that Daniel knows more about the cult than he is letting on. They crash into another vehicle. When Michael wakes up, Daniel is gone. Michael is threatened by the driver of the other vehicle that if he contacts the police about Two Gardens, his sons Ryan and Nathan will be killed. Inside Two Gardens, Ryan is told by Edward that he is making progress and may soon be ready for a cult-sanctioned relationship, while he and Hannah are secretly romantically involved already. Ryan visits Nathan, his mentally unwell brother, in the Two Gardens medical centre, where he realises that Nathan's condition is deteriorating and resolves to sneak him out of Two Gardens to a hospital.
2	"True Family"	Peter Burger	Written by : Peter Cox & David Brechin-Smith; Story by : Peter Cox, Kathryn Burnett & Nick Ward	1 October 2009
3	"Disappearing Act"	Scott Reynolds	Written by : Peter Cox, David Brechin-Smith, Kathryn Burnett & Nick Ward; Story by : Peter Cox, Kathryn Burnett & Nick Ward	8 October 2009
4	"A Mother's Love"	Scott Reynolds	Written by : Peter Cox & David Brechin-Smith; Story by : Peter Cox, Kathryn Burnett & Nick Ward	15 October 2009
5	"Hush Little Baby"	Charlie Haskell	Written by : David Brechin-Smith & Peter Cox; Story by : David Brechin-Smith, Peter Cox & Kathryn Burnett	22 October 2009
6	"14 Minutes of Shame"	Charlie Haskell	David Brechin-Smith & Peter Cox	29 October 2009
7	"Fathers and Sons"	Michael Duignan	Written by : Peter Cox & David Brechin-Smith; Story by : Peter Cox, David Brechin-Smith & Maxine Fleming	5 November 2009
8	"The Man from Momentum"	Michael Duignan	Written by : David Brechin-Smith & Peter Cox; Story by : David Brechin-Smith, Peter Cox & Maxine Fleming	12 November 2009
9	"Dying Isn't Easy"	Charlie Haskell	Peter Cox & David Brechin-Smith	19 November 2009
10	"Take Something I Love"	Charlie Haskell	Peter Cox & David Brechin-Smith	26 October 2009
11	"Beginnings"	Peter Burger	Peter Cox & David Brechin-Smith	3 December 2009
12	"Enhancement Day: Part One"	Peter Burger	Peter Cox & David Brechin-Smith	10 December 2009
13	"Enhancement Day: Part Two"	Peter Burger	David Brechin-Smith & Peter Cox	10 December 2009

== International broadcasts ==
- Brazil on Globosat HD
- Poland on Tele5
- Portugal on SIC Radical
- Spain on AXN
- Australia on the Seven Network
