= Andy Wong =

Chinese actor in New Zealand

Andy Wong is a Chinese actor in New Zealand who had a leading role in the drama Ride with the Devil. Wong's interest in acting began in high school, where he was involved in various school musical and drama projects.

His first professional role was that of Chow Yeoh, Li Mei's fiancé from China in the popular New Zealand drama Shortland Street. Wong was subsequently cast in No. 2, by Toa Fraser, which was featured at the Sundance film festival in the US, then was screened around the world in various film festivals. More recently he played a small part in a New Zealand/Singapore co-production called The Tattooist alongside American actor Jason Behr.
