= Rachel Nash =

New Zealand actress

- Born: New Zealand
- Occupation: Actress
- Years active: 1992 – present

Rachel Nash is a New Zealand actress who has appeared in many local films and television series over the years in New Zealand. She has had several guest roles in Shortland Street, as well as appearances in Mercy Peak, Outrageous Fortune, Legend of the Seeker and The Cult. More recently she has been starring as Ingrid, reincarnated with the Norse goddess Snotra in The Almighty Johnsons.

== Early life ==
Nash attended Lynfield College in Auckland.

== Filmography ==
Film and television
Year	Title	Role	Notes
1992	Shortland Street	Pauline	
1993	Shortland Street	Shelley the Pregnant Wife	TV series
1996	Shortland Street	Paula Doyle	20 episodes
1997	Life Class	Susan	
2000	Street Legal	Caroline	
2000	Shortland Street	Rhonda Meiklejohn	20 episodes
2000	Mercy Peak	Sue Lansford	3 episodes
2003	Spin Doctors	Eilene Haines	
2005	Cockle	Woman	
2005–2006	Shortland Street	Pamela Ashton	
2006	Outrageous Fortune	Anne-Marie Gibbs	3 episodes
2007	The Map Reader	Evelyn	
2007	Jinx Sister	Mairie Carter	
2007	We're Here to Help	Jill Pratt	
2008	The Pretender	TV Producer	
2008	Legend of the Seeker	Brigid	Episode: "Brennidon"
2009	The Cult	Frances Seger	
2010	Matariki	Midwife	
2011–2013	The Almighty Johnsons	Ingrid	Series regular
2015	Abandoned	Karen	TV film
