= The Water Horse: Legend of the Deep =

- Theatrical release poster
- Directed by: Jay Russell
- Screenplay by: Robert Nelson Jacobs
- Based on: The Water Horse by Dick King-Smith
- Produced by: Jay Russell; Douglas Rae; Robert Bernstein; Barrie M. Osborne
- Starring: Emily Watson; Alex Etel; Ben Chaplin; David Morrissey; Brian Cox
- Cinematography: Oliver Stapleton
- Edited by: Mark Warner
- Music by: James Newton Howard
- Production companies: Revolution Studios; Walden Media; Ecosse Films; Beacon Pictures
- Distributed by: Sony Pictures Releasing (Note: Distributed under the Columbia Pictures label)
- Release dates: 25 December 2007 (United States); 8 February 2008 (United Kingdom)
- Running time: 112 minutes
- Countries: United States; United Kingdom; New Zealand
- Language: English
- Budget: $40 million
- Box office: $104 million

The Water Horse: Legend of the Deep (stylised on-screen as simply The Water Horse) is a 2007 fantasy drama film directed by Jay Russell and written by Robert Nelson Jacobs, based on Dick King-Smith's children's novel The Water Horse. It stars Alex Etel as a young boy who discovers a mysterious egg and cares for what hatches out of it: a "water horse" (loosely based on the Celtic water horse) which later becomes the fabled Loch Ness Monster. The film also stars Emily Watson, Ben Chaplin and David Morrissey.

The film was produced by Revolution Studios and Walden Media, in collaboration with Beacon Pictures, and was distributed by Columbia Pictures (through Sony Pictures Releasing). Visual effects were completed by the New Zealand–based companies Weta Digital and Weta Workshop. The Water Horse was released in the United States on 25 December 2007 and in the United Kingdom on 8 February 2008. The film received positive reviews from critics and grossed $104 million against a $40 million budget.

== Plot ==
In present-day Scotland, a couple of American tourists meet an old man who, upon request (after seeing the surgeon's photo) tells them about the Loch Ness Monster and why the photo is a fake.

In 1942 during World War II, a boy named Angus MacMorrow lives in the manor house of Lord Killin on Loch Ness with his mother Anne MacMorrow and his sister, Kirstie. Lewis Mowbray comes to work as a handyman there. Angus' father Charles, the former handyman, is a sailor in the Royal Navy, missing since his ship was sunk in the war a year earlier. Angus is unable to accept that he will not return. One day, while collecting seashells, Angus discovers a large egg in the tide pool, which hatches a plesiosaur-like creature, which he names 'Crusoe' after Robinson Crusoe. He decides to keep the creature a secret, eventually telling his sister and Lewis. Lewis explains that it is a genderless "Water Horse" that lays one egg and dies before it hatches.

Royal Artillery troops arrive at the house, commanded by Captain Thomas Hamilton, a friend of Lord Killin. An artillery battery is set up near the lake to defend against German U-boats while the troops set up on the grounds. Meanwhile, Lewis decides Crusoe is so big they have to free him in the loch. Captain Hamilton proclaims Lewis to be a bad influence, and Angus' mother allows him to teach Angus some discipline. After a few days of training, he escapes, returning to the lake and reunites with a full-grown Crusoe, who gets Angus to ride on his back. After some time, he begins to dive. Angus protests diving, but he later enjoys himself and finally overcomes his phobia.

The next day, Captain Hamilton takes the MacMorrow family to a hill overlooking Loch Ness; Crusoe is almost hit by an exploding shell during a firing demonstration. Angus interrupts to save Crusoe from injury or death, enraging Hamilton and irritating his mother, who does not believe him and punishes him to be in his room at six every night for a month. Two fishermen who had seen Crusoe, try to take a photo of the creature for fame and fortune. When they cannot photograph the real thing due to the bombardment, they create an imitation. (The result is the real-life faked photo of The Loch Ness Monster known as "The Surgeon's Photo".) It interests a few soldiers, who go out to hunt it.

Sneaking out of his room with his sister's help, Angus visits the lake, calling for Crusoe. Crusoe rises, still in shock and fear from the earlier bombardment, and nearly bites off Angus's hand before sinking back into the loch. Hamilton's dog Churchill, having smelled Crusoe from the shore, alerts the soldiers of its presence before being eaten by Crusoe. Crusoe then surprises the soldiers and capsizes their boat, but one of them sends out an SOS to Hamilton, who thinks the Germans are attacking. At the loch, Angus calls out to Crusoe, who is attacking Strunk. In his attempt to calm Crusoe, Angus wades into the lake, slips and sinks.

Crusoe rescues Angus and Lewis revives him, and when his mother arrives, she finally believes him when she sees Crusoe. The nearby artillery battery soon opens fire upon Crusoe, mistaking it for a German U-boat. Angus, Hamilton, Anne and Lewis lead Crusoe to safety at the net, where Crusoe escapes into the sea. At sunrise, Angus finally accepts his father's death before they watch Crusoe leave. It is implied that Anne is also ready to move on, having fallen in love with Lewis. Over the years, several people claim spotting it, but Angus never sees Crusoe again while others say that it returns, seeking Angus.

The tourists thank the old storyteller and ask for his name, which he reveals to be Angus MacMorrow. Outside the pub, a mother calls out to her son William, who is walking down the beach. He spots a large "rock", which has an iridescent blue shell like Crusoe's, hinting that Crusoe has left a descendant behind to become the next Water Horse.

== Cast ==
- Alex Etel as Angus MacMorrow
  - Brian Cox as Older Angus MacMorrow
  - Louis Owen Collins as young Angus MacMorrow
- Emily Watson as Anne MacMorrow
- Ben Chaplin as Lewis Mowbray
- David Morrissey as Captain Thomas Hamilton
- Priyanka Xi as Kirstie MacMorrow
- Marshall Napier as Sgt. Strunk
- Joel Tobeck as Sgt. Walker
- Errol Shand as Lt. Wormsley
- Craig Hall as Charles MacMorrow
- Geraldine Brophy as Gracie
- William Johnson as Clyde
- Ian Harcourt as Jimmy McGarry
- Bruce Allpress as Jock McGowan

== Production ==
Director Jay Russell first read Dick King-Smith's book years before the film was actually made. "With the technology where it was at the time and the cost of that technology, we couldn't get it made then," said Russell. "Technology needed to catch up. It did, and it allowed us to do things I envisioned without it costing $300 million."

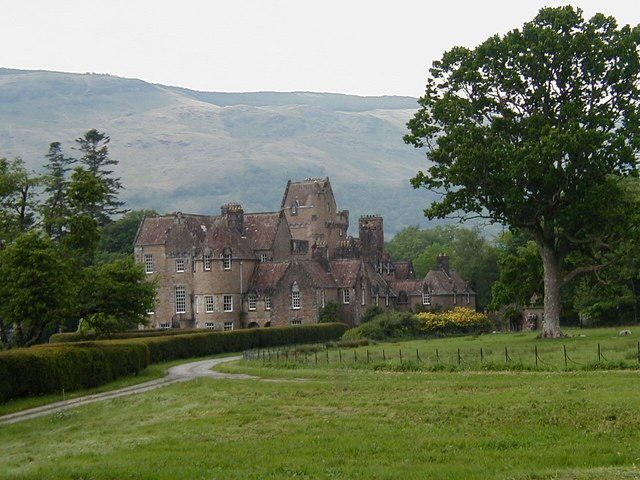
Ardkinglas, a house where Angus and his family lives during the movie.

=== Location ===
Filming took place in 2006 in New Zealand, Scotland and at Stone Street Studios in Wellington. Most of the film was shot in New Zealand, with Queenstown's Lake Wakatipu doubling for a Scottish Loch. The filmmakers found that some of the landscape and geography there was similar to Scotland. However Russell said, "There was no way I was going to make a movie about the Loch Ness monster and not shoot at least part of it in Scotland."

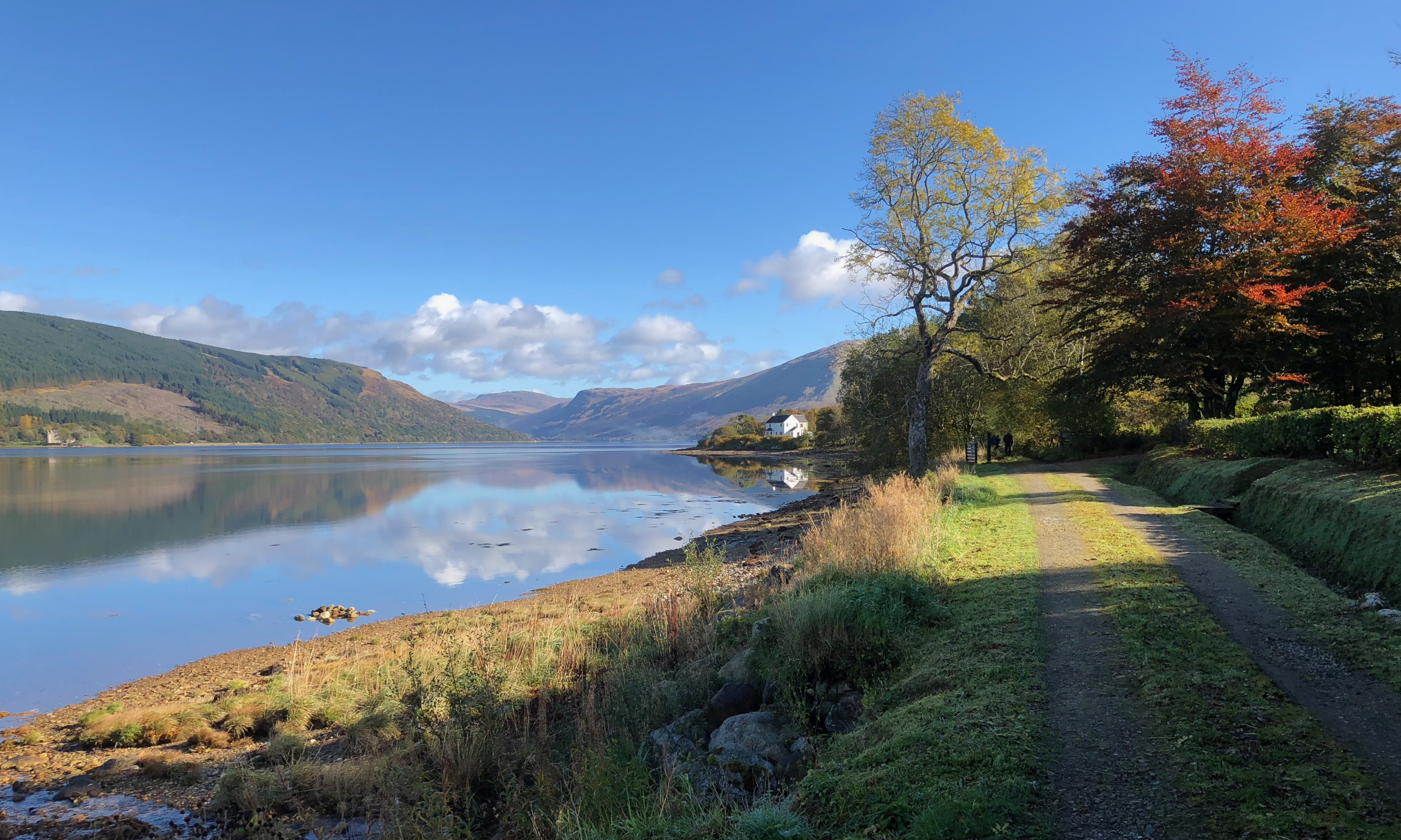
Loch Fyne, a sea lake located in the West of Scotland during the movie.

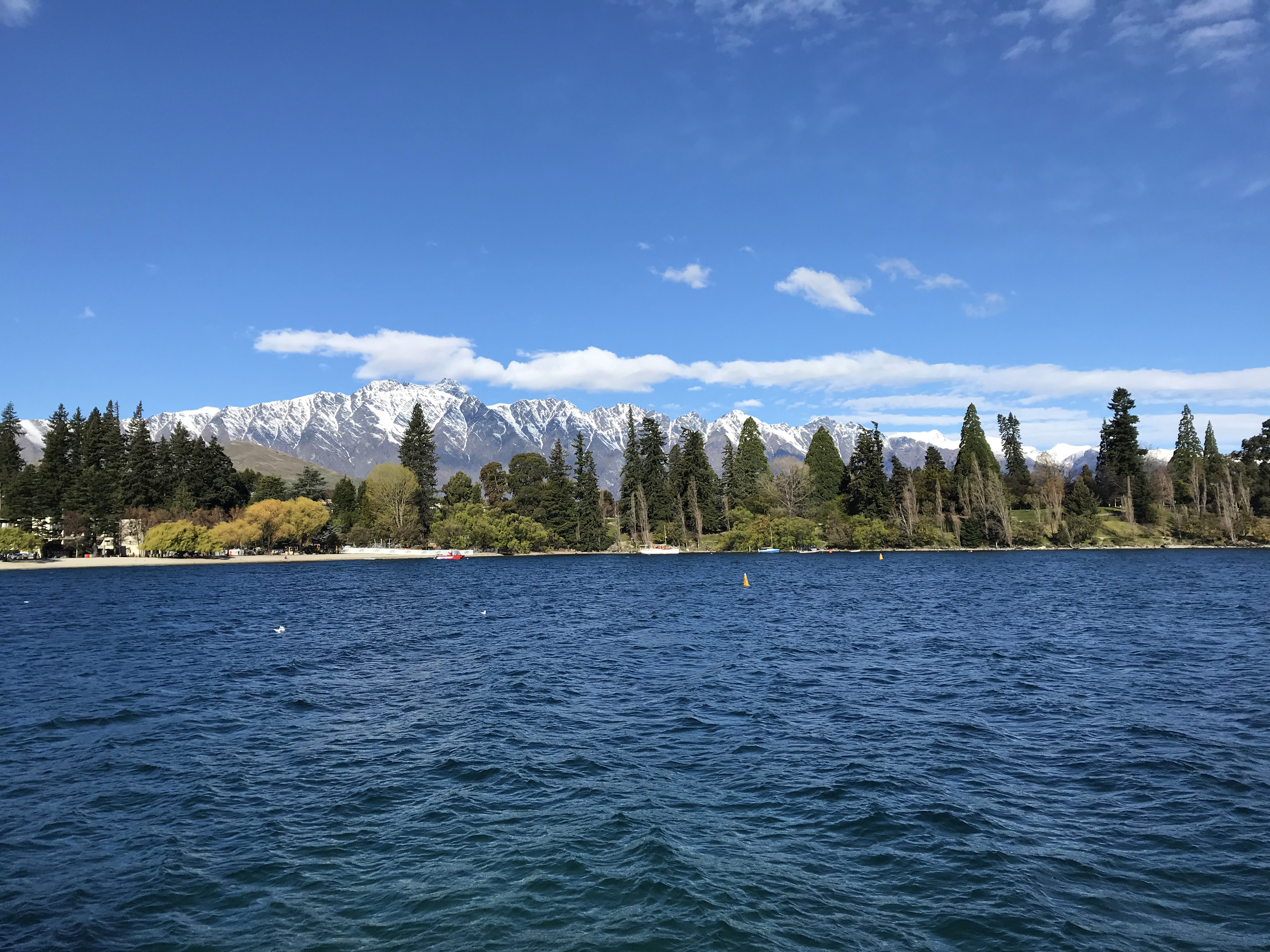
Lake Wakatipu, a lake located in New Zealand during the movie.

The scenes in and around the MacMorrow family's house were shot on the 100-year-old Ardkinglas Estate on the shores of Loch Fyne in Scotland. The owners of the estate continued to live in the house while the crew was filming there.

=== Visual effects ===
Visual effects on the film were handled by New Zealand visual effects specialists Weta Digital and Weta Workshop who mainly did Crusoe. Most of the roughly 600 effects shots in the film involved Crusoe. Many of those shots involved the creature (Crusoe) interacting with water, which, in terms of the history of computer graphics, has always been a particularly difficult substance to deal with. In terms of the design of the creature, Weta Digital tried to not humanise him but instead based some of his expressions on real animals such as a dog. "We wanted to create something which seemed familiar, but was unique at the same time," said Russell. "As a result, Crusoe's face is a combination of a horse, a dog, an eagle and a giraffe." When creating his movements and body shape at various stages of growth, the animators referenced animals ranging from baby birds to seals to whales.

== Soundtrack ==
The score was composed by James Newton Howard. Sinéad O'Connor contributed to the soundtrack with "Back Where You Belong".

== Release ==
The Water Horse was formerly scheduled for two different release dates in North America: 21 September 2007 and 7 December 2007. No reason has been given as to why either date was dropped, but the film was released across 2,772 screens in the United States, Canada and Mexico on Christmas Day of 2007. The MPAA rated the film PG for some action and peril, mild language and brief smoking.

Many release dates ranging from January 2008 to April 2008 were set for worldwide audiences including the United Kingdom (8 February), France (13 February), Russia (6 March) and India (4 April).

=== Marketing ===
A promotional poster for the film, featuring silhouettes of Etel's character and Crusoe on the loch, was seen as early as June 2006 during the New York Licensing Show alongside promotional art for the Disney Fairies and Kung Fu Panda. Another poster that features Etel's character with Crusoe on the loch during the daytime was released in October 2007. Two teaser trailers were released in quick succession in June 2007. The first was a teaser created specifically for the Rock Ness Music Festival on 9 and 10 June, but was leaked onto the internet and later pulled. A different trailer was released to Yahoo.com on 22 June 2007 and became the official teaser. Internet promotion includes several different official different websites in the English (with individual websites for the United States, the United Kingdom, Canada and Australia), Spanish, French and Russian languages. They were launched by Sony in early November 2007 and feature photos, video clips, a video blog, games and information on the film's plot and production. Another website was created by the film's production companies, asecretthisbig.com, and is dedicated to the examination of the Loch Ness Monster's existence in reality. Additionally, the film has a YouTube account which features the video blogs from the official website, as well as additional video content. Two sweepstakes were created for The Water Horse. The first, "See It To Believe It," awarded the winner with a family trip to the Aquarium of the Pacific. The second, "Unloch the Legend" awarded the winner with a family trip to Scotland. A 15-meter "water screen" was used to project a moving image, with sound, of the Water Horse in Tokyo Bay.

== Critical reception ==
The film received generally positive reviews from critics. As of 2024, the review aggregator Rotten Tomatoes reported that 74% of critics gave the film positive reviews, based on 90 reviews with an average rating of 6.7/10, classifying the film as "fresh", reaching the consensus that "The Water Horse is a fine family film. It takes a classic tale and infuses it with extra imagination, sly humor, heart, and inventive special effects." Metacritic reported the film had an average score of 71 out of 100, based on 24 reviews, indicating "generally favorable reviews". Audiences polled by CinemaScore gave the film an average grade of "A-" on an A+ to F scale.

Pete Hammond of Maxim magazine gave the film 4 stars out of 5, saying "It's not only the perfect holiday movie, but perhaps the most wondrous film of its kind since E.T.: The Extra-Terrestrial touched down." Hammond said the character Angus is "expertly played by Alex Etel," said the film was "skillfully directed by Jay Russell", and said the special effects were "stunning" and "rival the year's best." RogerEbert.com awarded the film three and a half stars out of four, complimenting the film's "real story about complex people" and the "first rate supporting performances" of Emily Watson, Ben Chaplin and Brian Cox.

== Box office ==
The film was a moderate box office success and grossed about $9 million during its opening weekend. As of October 2010, the film has grossed a total of $103,071,443 worldwide due to gaining about $40.4 million in the United States and about $62.1 million in foreign countries, according to the website Box Office Mojo.

== Home media ==
The film was released on DVD and Blu-ray on 8 April 2008 by Sony Pictures Home Entertainment.

== See also ==
- Loch Ness
- Loch Ness (1996)
- Magic in the Water (1995)
- Mee-Shee: The Water Giant (2005)
