= Freaky (TV series) =

- Genre: Horror; Thriller; Science fiction Fantasy; Mystery
- Created by: Thomas Robins
- Written by: Thomas Robins; Jason Stutter; Rachel Davies; Gabe McDonnell; Paul Yates; Jeremy Dillon; Zane Holmes; Pip Hall; Andrew Gunn
- Directed by: Thomas Robins; Jason Stutter; Rachel Davies
- Country of origin: New Zealand
- Original language: English
- No. of episodes: (13 episodes, 39 segments)

Production
- Producer: Tony Palmer
- Running time: 21-23 minutes
- Production company: Avalon Productions

Original release
- Network: TV2
- Release: 14 September – 14 December 2003

Freaky is a New Zealand horror anthology children's television series that was produced by Avalon Productions and funded by NZ on Air. It features episodes about children facing odd phenomena and eerie situations. Usually the protagonist is a boy or girl who starts by trying to do something normal and ordinary, and ends up facing an alien, supernatural or weird force of some kind. This is both a fantasy and science fiction show, with aliens, portals and time travel. Often it has a low level horror aspect as well, as in ghost visitations. It is comparable to a children's version of The Twilight Zone and The Outer Limits. It is set in New Zealand in ordinary locations such as houses, malls and schools.

It originally aired on TV2 on Sunday evenings at 5:00pm from 14 September to 14 December 2003 as well as TVNZ 6 New Zealand from September 2010 to December 2010. It also aired on ABC from early 2004 to mid 2009 and later on ABC3 in late 2009 to early 2010 in Australia.

== Synopsis ==
Each episode of Freaky presents three unique stories in each episode with its own set of characters, settings, and plotlines. The show often revolves around ordinary children who find themselves in extraordinary situations, encountering bizarre or supernatural phenomena. The episodes may involve elements such as time travel, parallel universes, robotic sister, paranormal occurrences, or otherworldly creatures.

With every episode, Daniel Costello would introduce each of the three stories, providing a little insight into the story.

== See also ==
- The Killian Curse
