= Priyanka Xi =

New Zealand actress

- Born: 28 July 1991 (age 35); Wellington, New Zealand
- Other name: Pri Xi
- Occupation: Actress
- Years active: 2006–2007

Pri Xi is a New Zealand born actor. She was born on 28 July 1991 in Wellington.

== Career ==
Xi began her professional acting career as a teenager in the first series of The Killian Curse. Her first movie role was as Kirstie MacMorrow in the film The Water Horse: Legend of the Deep.

In 2013, Xi participated in the Actors Program and taking part in the end of year production of Tennessee Williams Camino Real. In 2014, she played the part of Saunders in the Auckland Theatre Company's production of Noël Coward's play Fallen Angels.

== Filmography ==
Year	Title	Role	Notes
2006	The Killian Curse	Chelsea Regans	1st season only
2007	The Water Horse: Legend of the Deep	Kirstie MacMorrow	Co-starring
