= Jinx Sister =

- Directed by: Athina Tsoulis
- Written by: Athina Tsoulis
- Produced by: Larry Justice
- Starring: Sara Wiseman; Rachel Nash
- Cinematography: Rewa Harre
- Edited by: Julie Alp
- Music by: Brigid Ursula Bisley
- Release date: 19 July 2008
- Running time: 95 minutes
- Country: New Zealand
- Language: English
- Budget: $100,000

Jinx Sister is a 2008 New Zealand film written and directed by Athina Tsoulis. She was working as a film teacher at Auckland's Unitec and shot the film on a low budget with a crew that included Unitec students. It premiered at the Auckland International Film Festival on 19 July before a national release in October

Sara Wiseman stars as Laura who is returning to New Zealand after 10 years away believing she is a jinx on her family.

== Cast ==
- Sara Wiseman as Laura
- Rachel Nash as Mairie Carter
- Jarod Rawiri as Sam
- Jenni Heka as Hine
- Will Wallace as Phil Carter
- Rawiri Paratene as Tama
- Polly Lewis as Jessica Carter
- Maisie Lewis as Sophie Carter
- Cameron Rhodes as Laura's Father
- Sally McCormick as Laura's Mother
- Brittany Robson as Young Mairie
- Stacey Houghton as Young Laura

== Reception ==
The Press's James Croot gave it 2 1/2 stars and said it "is an intriguing but not quite fully engaging tale of family secrets and recriminations. Coming across like a contemporary version of fellow Kiwi film Rain, Jinx Sister is more of a character study than an action-driven narrative." On Radio New Zealand Graeme Tuckett praised the acting of Wiseman, Nash, Rawiri and Wallace noting they were working with a "fairly underwritten and not quite well thought enough script."

== Awards ==
2008 Qantas Film and Television Awards

- Best Picture – Budget under $1 Million - Athina Tsoulis & Larry Justice - nominated
- Performance by an Actress in a leading role in Film - Sara Wiseman - nominated
- Performance by an Actress in a supporting role in Film - Rachel Nash - nominated
