= Kissin' the Wind =

Single by Michala Banas
- Released: May 26, 2003
- Recorded: March 2003 at the Eargasm Studios, Sydney, Australia
- Genre: Pop
- Length: 3:38
- Label: Petrol
- Songwriter(s): Meredith Brooks, Shelly Peiken, Taylor Rhodes
- Producer(s): Craig Porteils

"Kissin' the Wind" is a pop song written by Meredith Brooks, Shelly Peiken and Taylor Rhodes, produced by Craig Porteils for Michala Banas' debut single. The song became Banas's most-successful single release, reaching the top thirty on the Australian ARIA Singles Chart.

== Track listing ==
1. "Kissin' the Wind" — 3:38
2. "Kissin' the Wind" (Eargasm dance mix) — 3:45
3. "Kissin' the Wind" (acoustic remix) — 3:38
4. "Kissin' the Wind" (music video) — 3:38

== Charts ==
Chart (2003)	Peak position
Australian ARIA Singles Chart	28
