= Gareth Reeves =

New Zealand actor

- Occupation: Actor
- Notable work: The Insiders Guide to Love; The Cult; Harry Potter and the Cursed Child

Gareth Reeves is a New Zealand actor who worked in Australia and New Zealand. For his performance in The Insiders Guide to Love he won the 2006 Air New Zealand Screen Award for Performance by an Actor in the Television section. He was nominated at the 2008 Qantas Film and Television Awards for Best Performance by an Actor in a leading role in Film for his role in A Song of Good.

Screen roles he has played includes the TV series The Cult, The Insiders Guide to Love as Luc, Underbelly as Kiwi Doug Wilson, Go Girls and films Pete's Dragon, Under the Mountain, A Song of Good and I'm Not Harry Jenson.

From February 2019 to July 2023 he played Harry Potter in the Melbourne production of Harry Potter and the Cursed Child. Other stage roles include Venus in Fur (2015, Darlinghurst Theatre Company), and The Dream (2014, a Bell Shakespeare’s reworking of A Midsummer Night’s Dream)
