= Renato Bartolomei =

New Zealand actor

- Born: 31 May 1963 (age 62); Australia
- Occupation: Actor

Renato Bartolomei is an Australian–New Zealand actor. Born in Australia of Italian descent, he started his acting career in Australia and is now a prominent actor in New Zealand. He had a prominent role as Craig Valentine in Shortland Street.

He starred in the TV2 series The Cult, as Michael Lewis.

== Filmography ==
=== Film ===
- I'm Not Harry Jenson (2009) as Colby

=== Television ===
- Blue Heelers (1994–1995) as Detective Scarlatti
- Xena: Warrior Princess (2000–2001) as Beowulf; recurring role, 4 episodes
- Mercy Peak (2001–2002) as Kieran Masfield
- Shortland Street (2004–2008) as Craig Valentine
- Legend of the Seeker (2008–2009) as Demmin Nass
- The Cult (2009), as Michael Lewis
- Intrepid Journeys (Travel series) (2011), as himself
