= Sara Wiseman =

New Zealand actress

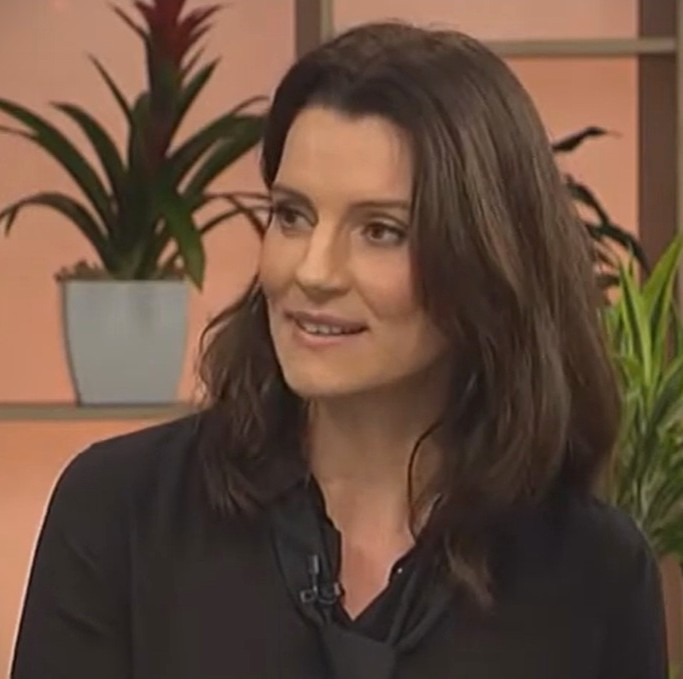
- Wiseman in 2017
- Born: Auckland, New Zealand
- Occupation: Actress
- Years active: 1995–present
- Spouse: Craig Hall (m. 2007; div. 2023)

Sara Wiseman is a New Zealand actress, best known for her roles as Dr. Nicky Somerville in the television series Mercy Peak (2001–2004), Annabelle Willis in The Cult (2009), and Carolyn Bligh in A Place to Call Home (2013–2018).

== Career ==
Wiseman has worked on both stage and screen, and has also worked as a presenter and voiceover artist.

Beginning her career with low-profile TV roles in Hercules: The Legendary Journeys (1996 and 1999), Xena: Warrior Princess (1995) and Jackson's Wharf (2000). In 2001, Wiseman was cast in the role of Dr. Nicky Sommerville in the New Zealand TV series Mercy Peak. Wiseman starred in Mercy Peak until 2002.

Wiseman also appeared in the movie Jinx Sister in 2008, for which she garnered her third New Zealand Film and Television Awards nomination under the category of "Performance by an Actress in a Leading Role".

Following this she went had recurring roles in television series such as Outrageous Fortune (2007–2008), Shortland Street (2011) and Crownies (2011).

During 2013, Wiseman appeared for the first time as recurring character Carolyn Bligh, in the Australian romantic drama series A Place to Call Home. Following a successful first season, the show was renewed for a second season, in which Wiseman's character was upgraded to a main character. Wiseman's storylines whilst on the show have included relevant world issues such as sexual assault, which the show explored during its third season when Wiseman's character was sexually assaulted by someone she had trusted, on the subject Wiseman has stated that the storyline was a "poignant and challenging subject matter to tackle". When the fourth season was due to air in 2016, Wiseman stated that there was "a darker edge" to the upcoming series. The fifth series of the show aired in 2017, and the sixth, and final series, aired in 2018.

Wiseman later appeared on Bevan Lee's Seven Network series Between Two Worlds with Hermione Norris, Aaron Jeffery and Alex Cubis. She joined the cast of CBBC drama Mystic in 2021. She also played Tanya Reed in series 3 of Harrow (2021).

In August 2022, Wiseman was cast in a role in the film Kingdom of the Planet of the Apes, directed by Wes Ball for 20th Century Studios.

In 2024 she had parts in two Australian drama series: the Foxtel/Binge series High Country, and the Netflix series Territory, set on a cattle station in the Northern Territory of Australia. In January 2026, Wiseman was announced as a returning member of the cast for the second series of High Country.

== Accolades ==
Wiseman has been nominated for film and television awards multiple times and in 2011 she won Best Supporting Actress in a Feature Film at the Aotearoa Film and Television awards for her role in Matariki. That year she was also a finalist for Best Lead Actress in a Feature Film for her role in The Insatiable Moon.

For her role in Mercy Peak, Wiseman garnered several nominations at the New Zealand Film and Television Awards under the category "Best Actress" in 2002

In 2005 Wiseman was nominated for the "Television - Best Performance By an Actress" award at the New Zealand Screen Award.

== Personal life ==
Wiseman was married to actor Craig Hall for sixteen years, before splitting in 2023. She publicly came out as bisexual in 2021.

== Filmography ==
=== Film ===
Year	Title	Role	Notes
2005	Luella Miller	Lydia	
2006	Sione's Wedding	Yes Yes Girl	
2008	Jinx Sister	Laura	
2010	Matariki	Megan	
2010	The Insatiable Moon	Margaret	
2011	Love Birds	Mum #2	
2011	Rest for the Wicked	Susan	
2013	Nerve	Jennifer	
2017	Human Traces	Tanya	
2022	Dark Noise	Senior Sergeant Joanne Kerr	
2024	Kingdom of the Planet of the Apes	Dar	Motion-capture role

=== Television ===
Year	Title	Role	Notes	Ref
1995, 2001	Xena: Warrior Princess	Young Woman / Amazon #1	Episodes: "Prometheus" & "Dangerous Prey"	
1995	Shortland Street	Wendy Diamond	Guest Role: 4 Episodes	
1996, 1999	Hercules: The Legendary Journeys	Hephates / Mab	Episodes: "Heedless Hearts" & "Once Upon a Future King"	
2000	Jackson's Wharf	Rebecca Priest	TV series	
2000	Street Legal	Louise Jarvis	TV series	
2001–2004	Mercy Peak	Dr. Nicky Somerville	Main role	
2002	Atomic Twister	Lisa Gilmore	TV film	
2002	Mataku	Petra	Episode: "The Heirloom"	
2004	Serial Killers	Skye	Episode: "Control, Alt, Delete"	
2006	Maddigan's Quest	Morag	Episode: "Tunnellers"	
2006	Fatal Contact: Bird Flu in America	Susan Wood	TV film	
2007–2008	Outrageous Fortune	Danielle	Recurring role	
2008	The Amazing Extraordinary Friends	Dr. Helen	Episode: "Mad Mike Molloy"	
2009	The Cult	Annabelle Wills	Main role	
2010–2011	Shortland Street	Jennifer Mason	Recurring role: 53 Episodes	
2011	Crownies	Lisa Simpson	Recurring role	
2011–2012	The Almighty Johnsons	Helen	Recurring role	
2012	Fatal Honeymoon	Anchor Person	TV film	
2013–2018	A Place to Call Home	Carolyn Bligh	Main role: 59 Episodes	
2014	Auckland Daze	Sara	2 episodes	
2015	The Doctor Blake Mysteries	Olivia Goldsmith	Episode: "This Time and This Place"	
2015	Venus and Mars	Sue Stewart	TV film	
2016–2018	Rake	Caitlin	Recurring role	
2017	Auckward Love	Olivia	7 episodes	
2019	The Sounds	Annette McGregor	7 episodes	
2020	One Lane Bridge	Jackie Ryder	Recurring role	
2020	Between Two Worlds	Sophia Grey	10 episodes	
2020	Inside	Jean	Episode #1.6	
2020	The Sounds	Annette McGregor	7 episodes	
2021–2022	Shortland Street	Francesca Telford	Recurring role: 42 Episodes	
2021	Harrow	Tanya Reed	4 episodes	
2021	The Gulf	Valerie Wells	5 episodes	
2021	Creamerie	Hunter	5 episodes	
2021	The Brokenwood Mysteries	Anne Robinson	Episode: "Here's to You, Mrs. Robinson"	
2021	My Life Is Murder	Eleanor	1 episode	
2021	Mystic	Lauren	1 episode	
2021	Power Rangers Dino Fury	Arla	Episode: "Phoning Home"	
2021–2022	One of Us Is Lying	Mayor Kelleher	3 episodes	
2021–2023	Under the Vines	Simone	7 episodes	
2024–present	High Country	Helen Hartley	8 episodes	
2024	Territory	Sandra Kirby	6 episodes	
2025–2026	Home and Away	Kerrie Matheson	Guest Role: 10 Episodes	
2026	Blue Murder Motel	Detective Annette Grainger	Guest Role	
2026	Crackhead	Ana Abrams	Recurring role	
