= Peter Malone (critic) =

Australian film critic

Peter Malone (born 1939) is an Australian film critic. He is a Roman Catholic priest and began his reviewing career in 1968 in The Annals, a publication of Missionaries of the Sacred Heart, with his first review being of To Sir with Love.

Malone has written many publications including the books The Film Movie Christs and Antichrists Myth & Meaning: Australian Film Directors In Their Own Words Screen Jesus: Portrayals of Christ in Television and Film and Dear Movies: Sharing Letters to My Favourite Films.

Malone was the editor of Compass Theology Review, the director of the Australian Catholic Film Office, and was president of the International Catholic Cinema Organisation.
