= Lala Rolls =

New Zealand filmmaker

Lala Rolls (born 1963 or 1964) is a Fijian-born New Zealand film director, producer and editor. Much of her work explores Polynesian and Māori culture.

== Biography ==
Rolls was born in Fiji to Australian and Dutch parents, and immigrated to New Zealand in 1981, aged 17 years old. She studied psychology at the University of Otago, completing a bachelor of arts degree. She worked in early childhood education and travelled overseas, including to study scriptwriting at London's Royal College of Art.

In 1992, Rolls returned to New Zealand and worked on a number of short film productions, including a series of six shorts, Tall Stories, and her first short film, Olives, which she wrote and directed in 1994. In 2006 she worked on a children's science show, QTV, for the Ministry of Education. Her largest project has been Tupaia's Endeavour, a documentary film which traces the journey of Tupaia, the Tahitian high priest navigator who agreed to navigate for Captain Cook and came to New Zealand in 1769.

In 2021, Rolls directed a digital animation experience, Ngā Tohunga Whakatere: The Navigators, telling the story of New Zealand’s early navigators. The production was shown on the dome screen at Space Place at Carter Observatory in Wellington.

Rolls is the founding director of film company Island Productions Aotearoa.

== Awards and recognition ==
- International Jury Prize: Tupaia's Endeavour at 2013 FIFO – Oceanian International Documentary Film Festival (Tahiti)
- Nominated for Best Editing, Documentary/Factual Programme: for Lovely Rita at 2008 Qantas Film and Television Awards
- Nominated for Best Editing – Non-Factual: for The Hothouse, episode 3 at 2007 Qantas Television Awards
- Nominated for Best Editing – Factual: for Flight Of The Conchords: A Texan Odyssey at 2007 Qantas Television Awards
- Nominated for Best Editing: for The Insiders Guide to Love at 2006 Qantas Television Awards
- Special Mention: Children of the Migration at 2005 DOCNZ Documentary Film Festival
