= Larry the Wonderpup =

- Genre: Animation; Children
- Starring: Ava Houben-Carter
- Country of origin: Australia
- No. of series: 1
- No. of episodes: 18

Production
- Running time: 22 minutes

Original release
- Network: 7TWO
- Release: 2 October 2018 – 2020

Larry the Wonderpup is an Australian live action and animated television series which first aired on 7TWO in Australia in 2018. The series is a co-production between Chocolate Liberation Front and WTFN.

Development

The property was originally developed by Dan Fill as a multi format show that combined live action, music videos and animated segments celebrating the relationship and imagination of girl and her pet. The original concept was called Larry The Wonderpug and was inspired by Fill's own beloved pug named Larry. Dan's production company Chocolate Liberation Front partnered with another Australian production company WTFN producers of hit television series Bondi Vet. During the development phase WTFN used Bondi Vet social media networks to run a casting call out for pugs. However during this call out phase the RSPCA contacted WTFN and asked producers not to

promote pugs in a lead role due to their breeding practices.

Production

Live Action production was shot in and around Melbourne Victoria. Animation was overseen end to end by Luke Jurevicius and his production company Vishus Productions. Both Dan Fill and Luke Jurevicius wrote episodes of the series and played cameos in the show. Luke also oversaw music composition for many episodes.

== Cast ==
- Ava Houben-Carter as Sasha
- Josephine Croft as Sue
- Claire Gazzo as Larry
- Charlie Crook as Norman
- Jason Mavroudis as Mateo
