= Thomas Robins (actor) =

New Zealand actor and filmmaker

- Born: New Zealand
- Occupations: Actor; Television presenter
- Years active: 1995–present

Thomas Robins is a New Zealand producer, director, writer and actor who was the original host of Squirt, a children's television series. He has also played roles in four films directed by Peter Jackson, the most notable being Déagol in The Lord of the Rings: The Return of the King.

== Filmography ==
=== Television ===
Year	Title	Role	Notes
2002–2003	The Strip	Doctor	"Woof" (S02E16)
2003	Freaky	Writer, creator Director	
2004	The Insider's Guide To Happiness	Karl	"Is Happiness an Accident?" (S01E01)
2005–2006	Seven Periods with Mr Gormsby	Alasdair Morton	Main role
2006	The Killian Curse	Martin	"Zombies" (S01E03)
2009–2010	Tales from Te Papa	Director	

=== Film ===
Year	Title	Role	Notes
1994	Heavenly Creatures		Deleted Role
1995	Forgotten Silver	Colin McKenzie	
2001	The Lord of the Rings: The Fellowship of the Ring	Déagol	Uncredited
2003	The Lord of the Rings: The Return of the King	Déagol	
2005	King Kong	New York Theatregoer	
2012	The Hobbit: An Unexpected Journey	The young Thráin II	
