= Mercy Peak =

- Genre: Drama
- Created by: Rachel Lang; Gavin Strawhan
- Starring: Sara Wiseman; Jeffrey Thomas; Craig Parker; Alison Bruce; Tim Balme; Tamati Te Nohotu; Renato Bartolomei; Miriama Smith; Dwayne Cameron; Angela Vint
- Composer: Joel Haines
- Country of origin: New Zealand
- Original language: English
- No. of series: 3
- No. of episodes: 60

Production
- Executive producers: John Barnett; Rachel Lang; Sally Campbell; Steven Zanoski
- Producer: John Laing
- Cinematography: Mark Olsen
- Editors: Allanah Milne; Nicola Smith; Nigel Cope
- Running time: 60 minutes
- Production company: South Pacific Pictures

Original release
- Network: TV One
- Release: 25 July 2001 – 19 March 2004

Mercy Peak is a New Zealand television series that ran for three seasons on local network TV One, between 2001 and 2004. The series rated well in New Zealand (especially in its second series) and won multiple awards for its cast. Though an ensemble show, Mercy Peak centres on a doctor (played by Sara Wiseman) who leaves the city to work at a hospital in the small town of Bassett. She works alongside stuffy but caring doctor William Kingsley (Jeffrey Thomas from Shark in the Park). The series was produced by Auckland company South Pacific Pictures; a number of those who worked on the show would have a big hand in South Pacific Pictures hit Outrageous Fortune, including co-creator Rachel Lang, directors Mark Beesley and Simon Bennett, and producer John Laing.

== Cast ==
- Sara Wiseman as Nicky Somerville
- Jeffrey Thomas as William Kingsley
- Craig Parker as Alistair Kingsley
- Alison Bruce as Louise Duval
- Tim Balme as Ken Wilder
- Tamati Te Nohotu as Cliff Tairoa
- Renato Bartolomei as Kieran Masefield
- Miriama Smith as Dana McNichol
- Dwayne Cameron as Gus Van der Velter
- Angela Vint as Helen Blakemore

== Episodes ==
=== Series 1 (2001–02) ===
No. overall	No. in series	Title	Directed by	Written by	Original release date
1	1	"What She Least Expected"	Geoffrey Cawthorn	Rachel Lang	25 July 2001
2	2	"Her Secret Passion"	Geoffrey Cawthorn	Rachel Lang	1 August 2001
3	3	"Some Kind of Madness"	Geoffrey Cawthorn	Gavin Strawhan	8 August 2001
4	4	"For the Greater Good"	Geoffrey Cawthorn	Gavin Strawhan	15 August 2001
5	5	"Paternal Feeling"	Mark Piper	Alberta Knight	22 August 2001
6	6	"More Things in Heaven and Earth"	Mark Piper	Rachel Lang and Niki Caro	29 August 2001
7	7	"Crime, Punishment and Everything in Between"	Andrew Merrifield	James Griffin	5 September 2001
8	8	"Bassett Confidential"	Andrew Merrifield	Gavin Strawhan	19 September 2001
9	9	"All's Fair"	Mark Piper	Rachel Lang	26 September 2001
10	10	"Lazy Sunday Afternoon"	Mark Piper	Gavin Strawhan	3 October 2001
11	11	"The Most Deserving"	Ian Mune	James Griffin	6 March 2002
12	12	"Lost and Found"	Ian Mune	Gavin Strawhan	13 March 2002
13	13	"Undue Influence"	Mark Beesley	Niki Caro	20 March 2002
14	14	"Patience"	Mark Beesley	Alberta Knight	27 March 2002
15	15	"Do the Right Thing"	Richard Sarell	James Griffin	3 April 2002
16	16	"The Best Laid Plans"	Richard Sarell	James Griffin	10 April 2002
17	17	"Revelations"	Peter Sharp	Jan Prettejohns	17 April 2002
18	18	"Chickens, Roosting"	Peter Sharp	Rachel Lang	24 April 2002
19	19	"Live and Let Live"	Andrew Merrifield	Judith van Trigt	2 May 2002
20	20	"Blame"	Andrew Merrifield	James Griffin	8 May 2002

=== Series 2 (2002–03) ===
No. overall	No. in series	Title	Directed by	Written by	Original release date
21	1	"Faint Heart Ne'er Won Fair Maiden"	Ian Mune	Rachel Lang	25 September 2002
22	2	"Stand by Your Man"	Geoffrey Cawthorn	Rachel Lang	2 October 2002
23	3	"The Making of Him"	Simon Bennett	Rachel Lang, Jan Prettejohns and Judith van Trigt	9 October 2002
24	4	"Put Away Childish Things"	Simon Bennett	Alberta Knight	16 October 2002
25	5	"Death and Taxes"	Geoffrey Cawthorn	Rachel Lang	23 October 2002
26	6	"Fear and Loathing"	Richard Sarell	Rachel Lang	30 October 2002
27	7	"Festival of Romance"	Geoffrey Cawthorn	Alberta Knight	6 November 2002
28	8	"Desire and Its Undoing"	Geoffrey Cawthorn	David Geary	13 November 2002
29	9	"Cruel to be Kind"	Norma Bailey	Kirsty McKenzie	20 November 2002
30	10	"To Kill a Minah Bird"	Norma Bailey	James Griffin	20 November 2002
31	11	"The Day That the Rain Came Down"	Simon Bennett	Jan Prettejohns	14 February 2003
32	12	"Reality Bites"	Simon Bennett	James Griffin	21 February 2003
33	13	"Pride and Prejudice"	Peter Sharp	Peter Allison	28 February 2003
34	14	"Light My Fire"	Peter Sharp	Rebecca Hobbs	7 March 2003
35	15	"One Wedding and a Funeral"	Randy Bradshaw	Rachel Lang	14 March 2003
36	16	"An Angel at My Wash House"	Randy Bradshaw	Kate McDermott	21 March 2003
37	17	"Fork in the Road"	Eleanore Lindo	Judith van Trigt	28 March 2003
38	18	"Saturday Night Fever"	Eleanore Lindo	James Griffin	4 April 2003
39	19	"Great Escape"	Simon Bennett	Jan Prettejohns	11 April 2003
40	20	"Do It for Love"	Simon Bennett	David Geary and Rachel Lang	18 April 2003

=== Series 3 (2003–04) ===
No. overall	No. in series	Title	Directed by	Written by	Original release date
41	1	"Oversexed, Overpaid and Over Here"	Geoffrey Cawthorn	James Griffin	1 August 2003
42	2	"Survival of the Fittest"	Geoffrey Cawthorn	Maxine Fleming	8 August 2003
43	3	"For Better, For Worse"	Niki Caro	Alberta Knight	15 August 2003
44	4	"Rules of the Game"	Niki Caro	Kate McDermott and Rachel Lang	22 August 2003
45	5	"Destiny in Motion"	Geoffrey Cawthorn	Judith van Trigt	29 August 2003
46	6	"Something in the Water"	Geoffrey Cawthorn	Rachel Lang	5 September 2003
47	7	"When Ken Met Wendy"	Simon Bennett	Rachel Lang	12 September 2003
48	8	"Good, Bad, Ugly"	Simon Bennett	Rebecca Hobbs and Rachel Lang	19 September 2003
49	9	"The Uses of Pork"	Vanessa Alexander	Alberta Knight	26 September 2003
50	10	"Suspicious Minds"	Vanessa Alexander	Maxine Fleming and Rachel Lang	3 October 2003
51	11	"Instinct"	Michael Bennett	Michaela Rooney	16 January 2004
52	12	"The Woodpile"	Michael Bennett	Judith van Trigt	23 January 2004
53	13	"Like the Nuns love Jesus"	Mark Beesley	Margot McCrae and Rachel Lang	30 January 2004
54	14	"The Company of Pigs"	Mark Beesley	Alberta Knight	13 February 2004
55	15	"The Book I Read"	Simon Bennett	James Griffin	20 February 2004
56	16	"History Lessons"	Simon Bennett	Lois Booton and Rachel Lang	27 February 2004
57	17	"The Fruit of Good Works"	Geoffrey Cawthorn	James Griffin	5 March 2004
58	18	"Honour Thy Father"	Geoffrey Cawthorn	Judith van Trigt and Rachel Lang	12 March 2004
59	19	"May the Force Be with You"	Simon Bennett	James Griffin	19 March 2004
60	20	"Love from Bassett"	Simon Bennett	Rachel Long	19 March 2004

== Reception ==
The show won three awards at the 2002 New Zealand Television Awards: Best Supporting Actor (Tim Balme), Best Supporting Actress (Alison Bruce), and Best Script. It won a further two awards at the following year's ceremony: Best Actor (Jeffrey Thomas) and Best Supporting Actress (Alison Bruce).
