= Philip Smith (producer) =

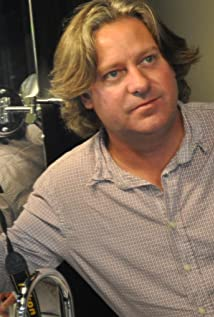
Philip Smith

Philip Smith is a New Zealand film and television producer, writer, journalist and musician. He is the founder and co-owner of Australasian media company, Great Southern Television, with offices in Sydney, Auckland and Queenstown.

Smith was awarded the Independent Producer of the Year Award by the Screen Production and Development Association. In 2018 he was named New Zealand Drama Writer of the Year, for the telemovie Why Does Love at the NZTV Awards. In 2020, he co-created the NZ drama, One Lane Bridge, which screens in 28 countries, including AMC in the USA and Arte in France. It won Best Drama in NZ in 2021.

According to IMDB Smith has created or co-created 70 television series in New Zealand and Australia, making him Australasia's leading television creative. He was previously a journalist at the New Zealand Herald. He left to join the Financial Times where he worked as a foreign correspondent from war-plagued nations including Burundi and Rwanda . He was the Financial Times correspondent based in Tanzania, East Africa.

Smith was later a journalist at TVNZ and broke the "Bad Blood Scandal" - an award-winning news investigation. He was the presenter of the Wednesday Wire at Auckland's student radio station BFM for three years. He worked for TVNZ in London and covered the Romanian revolution and also reported from Hungary. He won a New York Film and Television Award for his reporting on the Vulcan volcano eruption in Papua New Guinea.

He was the bass player in alternative band This Nations Dreaming which won single of the year in 1990.

Smith formed his first television company Uplink Sport with sports presenter Phillip Leishman. He sold the company to UK based sports marketing company Sportsworld Media. He started up a second television production company, Great Southern Television in 2002 with retailer Sir David Levene. The company produces drama, factual and entertainment shows globally. In January 2018, the National Business Review reported that Smith and Levene had sold 70% of Great Southern to Seven West Media in Australia, the owner of the 7 Network.

When the Seven Network phased out its independent in-house production company, Seven Studios, Smith bought back Great Southern, and now owns 100% of the Kiwi independent producer.

In 2025 Smith executive produced The Ridge, a drama co-production between the BBC and Sky. He also executive produced Blue Murder Motel with TVNZ, which has been a global hit, selling to ITV, Netflix, AMC and the ABC Australia. Great Southern owns both dramas.

== Personal life ==
As of 2006, Smith lived in Queenstown with his wife, Leanne Malcolm, a television presenter, and their son.
