= The Killian Curse =

- Title card in Series One
- Also known as: Room 21, Room 21
- Genre: Horror-fantasy
- Directed by: Thomas Robins; Wayne Vinton
- Starring: Georgia Fabish; Jacinta Wawatai; Beth Chote; Ivana Palezevic; Felicity Milovanovich; Priyanka Xi; Cameron Wakefield
- Country of origin: New Zealand
- Original language: English
- No. of seasons: 2
- No. of episodes: 14

Production
- Producer: Thomas Robins
- Production locations: St Patrick's College, Silverstream, New Zealand
- Running time: 25–30 minutes with ads, 21–25 minutes without ads

Original release
- Network: TV2 New Zealand; ABC3 Australia
- Release: 21 July 2006 – 20 March 2008

The Killian Curse is a New Zealand kidult horror-fantasy television show, directed by Thomas Robins and Wayne Vinton. Starring Nick Blake and local New Zealand children, The Killian Curse tells 21 stories of the students from Room 21, who must each face an evil curse placed on them by the sinister Charles Killian. Killian wants to get revenge on the people who caused his death shortly after founding the school in 1906. He needs to capture eleven souls to rise from the dead. There are two series, which first aired in 2006 and 2008.

== Premise ==
1906 Room 21 Students

The original students of Room 21 are caught doing a ritual led by Killian. The parents banished him, but a fire broke out during a struggle which eventually burned the interior of the classroom, killing Killian in the process. Before dying, he swore to get revenge by stealing the eleven souls needed to return from the dead. Killian also said that parents would be blind to the suffering of their children. It is only the other classmates of Room 21 who can see what is happening. One of the kids from present day Room 21 (and narrator of the events of 1906) happens to be the great, great grandson of the man directly responsible for Killian's death. The great, great grandfather and the others in the room at the time of Killian's death are presumed to be ancestors of the current kids in room 21. Shortly after, the room is sealed "forever", forever lasting until 2006, when the story begins. Some people who have watched it have been paranoid by the number 21 and have been seeing it repeatedly.

2006 Room 21 Students

After 100 years, Room 21 is unsealed by a principal who does not believe in curses, and it is up to the school janitor to tell the students about the curse. Some are sceptical until the first victim is taken. Filmed 2005–2006.

2008 (set in 2007) Room 21 Students

It has been a year and the last year students of Room 21 still got called out into the Room 21 Class. They all got their souls back, but some were repossessed. Those students are stuck in Killian's World/Lair. On Earth, they're zombies, but to adults, they are just normal. This series was filmed in 2007.

== Cast of series one and two ==
=== Reoccurring adults ===
- Charles Killian – Nick Blake
- Mr Timmins – Paul Yates
- Miss Pritchard – Tanea Heke
- Mr Elder – Grant Roa
- Miss Ryder – Holly Shanahan

=== Other characters ===
- Eddie Lockhart – Rafe Custance Katie Lockhart's brother.
- Troy – Johnny Hurn A basketball player who is a friend of Te Aroha.

=== Kids of Room 21 ===
All the kids in the cast are local tweens and teenagers from New Zealand. From the time of shooting the first series, the oldest was 16 (Ivana Palezevic, Tabatha), and the youngest was 11 (Georgia Fabish, Celia). All the kids appear in both series apart from Chelsea (Series 1) and Billie (Series 2).

The kids in character alphabetical order;

- Billie Anderson – Brooke Paske (Second series only) New exchange student in Room 21. Takes over Chelsea's place by having a similar personality and traits as Chelsea.
- Byron Turner – Tim Radich A skater boy. Does not listen and often takes risks.
- Celia West – Georgia Fabish A nerdy girl who loves insects and books. She is the reason everyone regained their souls in the first series.
- Charlotte Brunton – Grace MacDonald The class' "mean girl", very empowering. Has a secret love of porcelain dolls.
- Chelsea Regans – Priyanka Xi (First series only) Snotty, stuck-up girl. Bullies Celia by saying she has an 'ugly curse'.
- David White – Max Blake-Persen The first to be taken by the curse. Not much else is known about him.
- Elizabeth Ratana – Jacinta Wawatai A hydrophobic girl who enjoys kendo fighting. Te Aroha's best friend.
- Haley Bloomsfield – Zoë Robins Gullible, can be too nice and over committed.
- Jack Williams – Cameron Wakefield His great-great grandfather triggered the start of the curse. He always looks out for everyone in the class and finds a way to talk to the class from Killian's world in series 2.
- Jen de Jong – Felicity Milovanovich Shown to like sports in the first series. She appears to have a crush on Byron in Series 2.
- Johnny Campbell – Thomas Williams The class joker. He provides comic relief in dire situations.
- Karen Smyth – Frith Horan Lucy's ex-best friend. Has a crush on Will.
- Karl Bennett – Sharn Te Pou Believed there was no way to beat the curse in Series 1. Slightly selfish.
- Katie Lockhart – Beth Chote The class goth girl. Appears to also have a crush on Byron.
- Keith Wilson/Donaldson – James Shaw Bully turned nice, cares about everyone's safety.
- Lucy Myers – Liffey Jacobson-Wright A girl with phone addiction. Was Karen's best friend, but they fell out.
- Miles Delany – Brayden Muir-Mills Pessimistic, not very encouraging. Often humiliates Will.
- Owen Jameson/Slater – James Croft A computer geek. Always seen with gaming console.
- Shane Arnold – Riley Brophy Often described as a 'geek'. Was a victim of Keith's bullying in Series 1.
- Tabetha Simpson – Ivana Palezevic A girl who wants to be a director. Tries to be positive.
- Te Aroha Pene (TP) – Greer Samuel The sportiest in the class. Elizabeth's best friend.
- Will Taylor – Andrew Hampton A boy who wants to be a movie star. Appears to have a crush on Karen in Series 2.

== Series one ==
The first series was initially screened in New Zealand on 21 July 2006 on TV2.

Note: all episode names are unofficial.

=== Beginning/Possessor/Warlock ===
David – A janitor attempts to warn the class about Killian's curse, but David, as usual, leaves the classroom early. They hear a scream, and when the whole class finds David, his soul has been taken, starting the curse. The appearance of the number 21 is when it is found written above the classroom door.

Celia – She is being followed by a demon who is attempting to possess her, in turn taking her soul. She defeats it by trapping it within the body of her pet cockroach, then crushing it. Mr. Timmins writes the number 21 on the blackboard after Celia answers a maths question he asked.

Johnny – He is taken to hospital when his bike crashed while he was chased by an ambulance, who turns out to be a warlock who wants his fat. The warlock is killed when Johnny stabs him with a fat-injecting needle and the warlock blows up. Earlier, Johnny rode past a letter box with the number 21 written on it.

=== Water/Phone/Werewolf ===
Elizabeth – A kraken hides in the school's pipe system, so she follows it to the old swimming pool. She unplugs the drain in an attempt to defeat it, but she is taken. The number "21" was found written on a cubicle door.

Lucy – She has a poltergeist in her phone, which tries to "download" her soul to Karen's phone. Lucy beats her curse by putting Karen's phone in the microwave. The brochure advertising the mobile phone says "JUST TEXT 21".

Owen – His curse is a werewolf whom he tries to defeat by locking it out, but a teacher leaves him outside to be taken. The number 21 appeared as read on the calendar in the teacher's office. This episode features Jed Brophy as the werewolf.

=== Zombies/Witch/Domicile ===
Karen – She is in a grocery store when she is attacked by zombies, but defeats them by trapping them in an oven. Karen paid 21 dollars for chocolate bars.

Charlotte – When Charlotte goes over the fence of an old house to return her necklace that was thrown over by a bully, a cat takes it inside the house. Despite warnings from Jen and Celia, Charlotte goes after it. She finds it, but the house's owner, a witch, takes her soul before she gets out. The number "21" is carved on the fence outside the old house.

Katie – She goes to her uncle's place during the weekend with her father and brother. She is attacked by a demon called Haki who can enter every nook and cranny. Her soul is taken when she mistakes it for their neighbour. The number 21 was seen on a painting of demons.

=== Dream/Energy/Wendigo ===
Miles – He is forced to fight an alien in his curse. Will, thinking that it is his curse, escapes, but Miles is left behind; therefore, his soul is taken. The curse was triggered when Miles had watched 21 seconds of Will's humiliating performance.

Te Aroha "TP" – She is forced to compete against a demon in a basketball game. She defeats the demon by ripping its head off and throwing it in a waste paper basket. The curse is triggered when she bumps into a basketball player wearing the number "21".

Karl – He originally doubts that there is a way to defeat the curse, but with the help of Jack, he defeats a wendigo. The number 21 manifests as a carving on a tree that Karl and Jack both ride past.

=== Voodoo/Mummy/Shadows ===
Will – In an attempt to cause Keith some pain, Karen sets up a voodoo doll that ends up affecting Will instead. It is overcome by hiding the doll in a tin with air holes where no one will find it. The number 21 is "accidentally" written in Will's blood on the doll.

Shane – On a school field trip, Shane, Keith and Chelsea are attacked by a mummy. Shane tries to defeat it by removing its bandages, but it is still invisible on the inside. He is taken. Killian locks the kids in a storage room with the code 0021.

Jen – Jen is attacked by a shadow demon that can manipulate the real world by moving objects' shadows. It manages to claim Jen's soul just before it is destroyed by a T-rex doll. The number 21 manifests as a shadow formed by a toy swan's neck and a candle on Jen's bedroom wall.

=== Vanity/Future/Vampires ===
Chelsea – A vanity curse makes her fall apart, but it is defeated by allowing people to look at her. "21 kisses FREE!" is found written on a magazine Chelsea was reading in class.

Keith – His future self comes to claim his soul and calls Keith hopeless, but he goes on to prove his future self wrong. The number appears when Keith records his 21st day wagging school.

Haley – A vampire attacks her in a blood bus. She is defeated, but eventually returned. This episode features Nathaniel Lees as Haley's demon, Mr James. The number 21 appears when the vampire, disguised as a blood donor, offers Haley biscuits and says that she had been "so helpful, [she could] take... 21."

=== Car/Drama/Finale ===
Byron – He tries to escape a car demon by attempting to jump the gap across an unfinished bridge. He misses and is only just hanging on when Killian shows up. Killian gives him two choices: either he would let go and fall into a garbage truck, and he will be free if he survives, or Killian could let him up, but take his soul. Byron chooses the former, but Killian pushes the garbage heap, then catches Byron and takes his soul. "21" manifested on the demonic car's license plate.

Tabetha – She decides to make a school play about the curse. Killian summons the ghost of an ex-drama teacher so he could get her soul, but decided to take part in the play first. During the play, Tabetha sets up an exorcism and banishes the ghost back to the spirit world. The number "21" is found on a flood light which fell onto the ground.

Jack – His soul is taken by Killian, but he is returned with the others taken. The surviving students realise that the curse can be undone by smashing a gravestone which bears the names of the students Killian had taken. After a name is smashed off, that person's soul is returned, and they are returned to the classroom (Room 21). After Killian's defeat, the students leave the school triumphant and ready to tackle another year at Killian High. Killian was not actually defeated.

== Series two ==
The second series began screening in New Zealand on 8 or 9 February (different sources say different things), 2008 on TV2.

=== Mechanical Demon/Giant Moth ===
It starts with the pupils of room 21 having an "apoplectic vision" of Killian destroying Killian High whilst in the first assembly. Jack challenges Killian, saying it is just a dream, but is overpowered. Killian then says that they will all be experiencing the curse for another year, with one of them helping him. They all reawaken to be placed back in room 21. The Principal also has them sign a contract to say that they will not talk of the curse for that year before introducing Billie, an exchange student from America who is automatically under suspicion. Jack puts in a buddy system so that Killian will not get anyone on their own.

Byron – Byron is challenged by Killian and a mechanical demon to a skateboarding challenge for his soul. They use Jen as a motivator by locking her in a cage. While she escapes, he is taken. "21" is found on a dollar sign tag.

Celia and Jack – She attempts to defeat a giant moth demon by getting all the kids in Room 21 to attack it, but the Traitor turns on a torch in Celia's eyes and the moth takes Celia's soul. Jack hits it a few times, then the Traitor turns on the torch again this time in Jack's eyes. The moth then takes Jack's soul. Owen beats it. Later on, Billie comes holding a flashlight, leading her to get the blame for the Traitor's misdeeds. "21" was found on a page on Celia's textbook.

=== Camping/Virus/Hand ===
Miles – Room 21 except Shane go on a school camp, when the same demon (Werewolf Jed Brophy) from Owen's last curse shows up and attacks them. They all split up and trap the wolf, but it was not after Owen. It was after Miles, who was not helping and was back at the camp. They run back to the camp to find him tied up and his soul taken by the werewolf's wife. Billie shows everyone Karen's rope-burned hand, suspecting her to be the culprit; however, it was because she pulled the rope too tightly when she was fixing her tent at the beginning of the episode. The Traitor actually tied Miles up. "21" is shown on Johnny's digital watch.

Shane – His curse is a computer virus that affects him in the form of living mucus while he is home sick. He defeats it after he clicks 'Destroy virus' on his computer. The Traitor is there, trying not to help Shane. "21" was found on the chat screen.

Karen – Continuing from Miles' 2nd curse, her possessed hand forces her to do bad things like hitting other students and destroying a gift from a sister school. She defeats it by pulling it off with a wood vice and dodging it so it flies out the window into a box of charity toys. The Traitor locks her in a room, but she manages to escape. "21" appears when it is written on a piece of paper by Karen's possessed hand.

=== Shrinking/Game/Past ===
Johnny – His curse is shrinking that he initially attributes to his losing weight. He is knocked off a ledge, where he is attacked by a spider larger than himself. The curse is defeated when he gets an allergic reaction to a bee sting. "21" is shown on Johnny's drink bottle.

Elizabeth – Her curse is a kendo video game. She and Karl attempt to play, but Karl is quickly knocked unconscious; she defeats the oni that was sent after her. In the end, the Traitor attempts to take her soul, but fails and retreats. The number 21 appeared on a sign in a take-away shop.

Te Aroha – Her curse is when she goes back in time into the past years of Killian High. She meets a spirit that warns her about three 19th-century bullies that Killian had sent. The bullies chase her onto a train where Killian asked her for her ticket, then the train pulled her into the world of lost souls, where she saw Jack. The number 21 appears when TP goes past the number on a wall in graffiti.

=== Necromancer/Voodoo/Immunity ===
Lucy – Her demon is a medium possessed by a necromancer, who attacks most of the girls at the library, then the demon goes to Lucy's house. Karen tries to warn her, but it is too late. The girls had set a seance near section "012-021" in the library.

Will – He brings back the voodoo doll from his last curse (when Karen's voodoo doll affected Will instead of Keith) because he does not believe it is safe with the Traitor around and knows it still works. The Traitor takes the doll, and pulls Will's legs and arm off, then put them in the school furnace. Karen managed to save the doll and sew his arms and legs back on. "21" was found on top of the Anti-Killian Meeting door.

David – His curse is on Killian's Island (a nod to Survivor). He is tripped over during the chase for immunity, and several students blame him to be the traitor. They vote him out, and Killian takes his soul. The "credits" for Killian's Island read "Room 21".

=== Time/Dolls/Magic ===
Haley – Her curse is a time demon that can stop time with a clock that can also go back or forward to any time by changing the time on it. Haley defeats the demon by snatching the clock from him, then turning the time backwards to the time Haley found out about her curse and smashing it. The demon accidentally reveals that the Traitor is a girl. The number 21 is found on an encyclopedia in the library.

Charlotte – Her curse is when her porcelain dolls come to life. First she takes a porcelain doll off a girl and takes it home. The doll starts her curse. She tries to defeat them by smashing them, but they shrink her. She wakes up as a doll herself, and another doll pulls her into the house and takes her soul. The number 21 was found on one of Charlotte's rulers.

Karl – His curse is at Shane's house on his birthday when the magician makes Karl disappear. He is then taken to a different stage, and is forced to perform the art of escapology. He is lifted into the air and dangled above a chainsaw while tied in chains. He has 30 seconds to escape, but fails, and has his soul removed. The number 21 appears when the magician changes the track on the CD player to track 21.

=== Dead Man/Movies/Drawing ===
Owen – His curse is a dead man possessed by Killian who tries to take his soul during his work experience at a funeral parlor. The dead man nails him into a coffin and tries to put him into a cremation furnace, but he gets his chain and loops it over a bolt on the conveyor. The traitor, however, takes it off, so Owen bangs his coffin off the conveyor, opening it again and defeating his curse. The man had died on 21 February 2007.

Tabetha – Her curse is when she is sent into a movie by Killian and has to fight her way past a Hookman-themed demon in a stereotypical horror movie plot. She runs away from the demon into the basement. The demon starts to fire shots at her, eventually hitting the main circuit board, allowing Tabetha to escape and defeat the curse. The number 21 appears when she sits in seat number 21.

Katie and Keith – Her curse is when she draws a demon taking Keith's soul. The next day, it comes true, and her classmates get suspicious. When a two-dimensional comic demon starts attacking her and gives the headmaster a heart attack, she realises she can control the demon by drawing in her book. Katie then has to shrink the demon, step on him, and burn him alive. 21 was mentioned when Katie's pens rolled together to make 2 and 1.

=== Reflection Demon ===
Billie – Billie is the last student to have to face their demon. Hers is a reflection demon that affects the real world. She confronts it in a school bathroom and, it tries to take her soul. The rest of the class helps her get away. The Traitor is then revealed to be Jen, who was possessed during the first episode. Everyone whose soul was not taken then goes through the portal to Killian's world. After that, Killian locks them with a Latin spell and tries to take their souls instead of the others', who had escaped, but eventually, he disappears when a giant rabbit (from Karl's curse) pulls him down when he was rising to go to earth and fights him. Afterwards, they all look up at the portal as it closes, rendering them trapped in Killian's world.

- Chelsea did not get a curse because she went to live with Billie's family, while Billie stayed with her family.

=== The Traitor ===
In the new year at Killian High, Killian told the Room 21 students that there was a traitor among them. Billie, the new girl, was blamed.

The Traitor commits multiple heinous acts against their classmates, such as letting go of Byron after being told to, letting Jack and Celia be killed by the giant moth, taking Will's Voodoo doll, tripping David over as he was running away from demons on Killian's Island, trying to stop Elizabeth from exiting her cursed kendo game, tying up Miles, throwing Johnny off the desk while shrunken, stealing Elizabeth's phone and then using it to lure Te Aroha to the train station, letting Owen through a crematorium, locking the door when Karen is wrongly punished, and locking the door of the bathroom before pushing Billie in through the mirror.

Most people in Room 21 are accused of being the Traitor, including Karen (because of the rope burn on her hand possessing it), Katie (because her drawing makes Keith lose his soul), Tabetha (calling Owen, making the dead man find his hiding spot) and David (because he was thought to have taken Will's Voodoo doll) just to name a few. However, Billie is normally the one who gets the blame for the traitor's actions. If one watches closely, they can tell it is not her for a number of reasons:

- The Traitor always wears a jumper (or something that hides their face), and Billie doesn't wear a jumper until the last two episodes.
- The Traitor drops a scarf in Elizabeth's curse. There is no evidence that Billie owns a scarf (all the kids in the first series wore scarves).
- In Miles' curse, someone is seen running away from the group during their chase in the woods. Their hair is blonde, but it is not curly (like Billie's) and it is plaited. In that situation, only Jen's and Karen's hair was plaited.
- The Traitor has grey socks and proper school shoes (as seen in Will's curse). Billie wears white socks and ballet flats with her uniform until the last two episodes.
- Billie's skirt is shorter than the other kids' skirts and shorts. In Will's curse, one can see the back of the traitor. Their skirt/shorts are down to just above the knee.

In the final episode, the traitor is revealed to be Jen, although she was being controlled by a demon (that possessed her in the first episode, when she disappeared while with Byron) who would take her soul for themselves instead of Killian having it. In the end, when they defeat Killian with the demon from Karl's curse, the Rabbit, the whole of Room 21 is stuck in Killian's world even though he was defeated. It still looks as if they had their souls taken out, as they cannot get out as the portal closed.

== Home release ==
The DVD release of The Killian Curse was due to have been around a week after the final episode of the first series was broadcast, but was delayed for unknown reasons. It was eventually released on 14 December 2006.

The DVD differs from the broadcast version, as it is shown in 16:9 widescreen, whereas free-to-air New Zealand television (as well as some of the pay TV channels) still broadcast in standard 4:3 format. There is currently no DVD of the second series.

== Awards ==
The Killian Curse won "Achievement in Sound Design in General Television" at the Qantas Film and Television Awards 2008..It was nominated for "Best Children's Programme" at the Air New Zealand Screen Awards 2007.
