= Ride with the Devil (TV series) =

- Created by: Alex Mack
- Directed by: John Svendson
- Starring: Alex Mack, John Svendson
- Country of origin: New Zealand
- Original languages: English, Maori and Putonghua
- No. of episodes: 6

Production
- Production location: black

Original release
- Network: TVNZ

Ride with the Devil is a New Zealand drama, which aired at 11pm on Tuesday nights on TV2.

The story was about two great racing fans - Alex Mack (Xavier Horan) and Lin Jin (Andy Wong). Williams was a local kiwi while Lin was a rich exchange student from Beijing, China. Jin is introduced to the Auckland street racing scene, but things go horribly wrong and someone is killed.

== Cast ==
- Xavier Horan as Kurt Williams
- Andy Wong as Lin Gin
- Caleigh Cheung as Amy, Lin's cousin
- Lynette Forday as Wendy, Amy's mother and Lin's aunt
- C. K. Cheung as Ray Wong, friend of Amy's dead father and Lin's uncle, university professor
- Anna Hutchison as Pony, Amy's best friend
- Ryan Richards as Marko
- Angela Bloomfield as Shona
