= Peter Hobbs (composer) =

New Zealand composer

Peter Hobbs (born 17 June 1970) is a New Zealand screen composer and musician. He has scored soundtracks for films, television, commercials, art installations, and contemporary dance works. He also fronts the band Lost Demos.

== Professional life ==
Peter Hobbs has been awarded internationally as a film composer, and sound designer. He currently operates Harmonic Studio, a music and sound studio in Auckland, New Zealand. Hobbs describes himself as a "diehard advocate for the spaces between the notes". Hobbs plays guitar and vocals for alternative country band Lost Demos along with Andrea Holmes on drums and backing vocals, Jon Baxter on trumpet, Puck Murphy on banjo and accordion, Kieran Scott on electric and slide guitar and Rua Sargent on bass. Their first song in three years was Watching the World Go Down in 2020, which is about the new Covid-19 era.

== Composing work ==
Hobbs has composed soundtracks for a number of New Zealand films, including Jean, (the story of Jean Batten) for which he won a Gold for Best Original Music at New York Festivals Awards and Best Original Score at the 2017 NZ Television Awards. He scored James Napier Robertson's 2009 feature film, I'm Not Harry Jenson and has written music for a number of long-running television series, most notably the hit Australian show Highway Patrol, now in its eighth season. Hobbs is a frequent collaborator on artistic projects, creating soundscapes for virtual reality and other visual mediums, such as with photographer Chris Sisarich. He created music alongside and visual effects artist Jon Baxter, the video experience for the New Zealand pavilion at the Frankfurt Book Fair in 2012 for Inside Out Productions a collaboration with Patterson Architects.

He regularly works with the leading Māori dance company Atamira for which his soundtracks have been described as "quietly rhythmic, smoky" and "dramatic". In 2016 he collaborated with famed NZ musician Shayne Carter and master Taonga pūoro player James Webster on the soundtrack for Pango, a new contemporary dance piece for Atamira that toured China. The team of Hobbs, Carter, Webster and Artistic Director Moss Patterson was described as "the marriage of...four stunning talents". Hobbs has mentioned his admiration of film composer Cliff Martinez.

== Film soundtrack credits ==
- Mana Wahine (2019) (short film)
- Jean (2016)
- Abandoned (2015)
- King of Caravans (2013)
- Tangiwai, A Love Story (2012)
- Last Flight (2011)
- I'm Not Harry Jenson (2010)

== Television soundtrack credits ==
- Extreme Treks (2019) (Season 3)
- Coastwatch Oz (2013)
- Pirates of the Airwaves (2013) (Additional Music)
- Unsung Heroes (2012)
- Fire Scene Investigation (2010)
- Highway Patrol (2008–present)
- Highway Cops (2011–present)
- Burying Brian (2008)
- Rude Awakenings (2007)

== Contemporary dance soundtrack credits ==
- Tomo, Atamira Dance Company (2019)
- Pango, Atamira Dance Company (2016–17)
- Manaia, Atamira Dance Company (2016)
- Moko, Atamira Dance Company (2015)

== Screen sound design and audio post credits ==
- King of Caravans (2013)
- Whakatauki (2012)
- I'm Not Harry Jenson (2010)
- The Kiwi who Saved Britain (2010)
- Fire Scene Investigation (2010)
- Kia ora Molweni (2010)
- Spartacus (TV series) (2009) (Additional Dialogue Recording)
- Charlotte: My Story (2009)
- The Jacquie Brown Diaries (2008)
- The Devil Dared Me To (2007)
- Back of the Y Masterpiece Television (2001)

== Music editing credits ==
- Sione's Wedding (2006)
