= Cameron Rhodes =

New Zealand actor (born 1967)

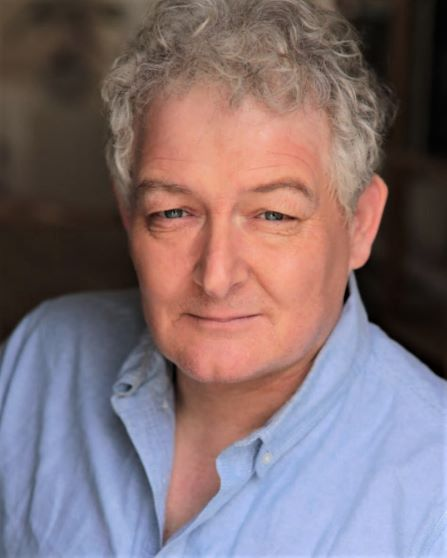
- Rhodes in 2020
- Born: 1 August 1967 (age 59); New Zealand
- Years active: 1992–present

Cameron Heaton Rhodes (born 1 August 1967) is a New Zealand film and theatrical actor and director.

== Life and career ==
Rhodes graduated from Toi Whakaari: New Zealand Drama School in 1987 with a Diploma in Acting. He has appeared in various TV shows (including Spartacus: House of Ashur, Xena: Warrior Princess) and films including The Royal Treatment, The Lord of the Rings, Mr. Pip, and Housebound. He plays Dr Plummer in the popular TV series The Brokenwood Mysteries.

Rhodes has appeared in over 100 theatre productions in New Zealand and Australia, playing roles including Hercule Poirot in Murder On The Orient Express, Cyrano in Cyrano De Bergerac, Orgon in Tartuffe, a Silo Theatre production in 2011 and Truscott in Loot.

He appeared as Garfield Todd in Black Lover by Stanley Makuwe produced by The Auckland Theatre Company and first presented at the Auckland Festival in 2020. Television work includes The Luminaries for BBC1, The New Legends of Monkey on Netflix, and Rake for ABC Australia. He plays Gavin Walters in the mockumentary web-series Colour Blind by Australian actor Tai Hara about casting agents.

As a director Rhodes in 2014 co-directed with Ian Mune Once On Chanuk Bair by Maurice Shadbolt for Auckland Theatre Company.

== Stage and screen roles ==
=== Theatre ===
Selected theatre productions include: King Lear, Gloucester at Auckland Theatre Company

- Murder On The Orient Express, Poirot, by Ken Ludwig, Auckland Theatre Company
- King Lear , Gloucester, Auckland Theatre Company
- Agamemnon by Aeschylus translated and directed by Tolis Papazaglou and Phillip Mann, Downstage Theatre (1997) - actor
- Sweeny Todd director Colin McColl, Downstage Theatre (1999) - actor (Beadle Bamford)
- The Duchess of Malfi by John Webster, director Colin McColl, Auckland Theatre Company - actor (The Cardinal)
- Tartuffe by Molière director Shane Bosher, Silo Theatre production (2011) - actor (Orgon)
- Live Live Cinema: Dementia 13 and Carnival of Souls creator and composer Leon Radojkovic, director Oliver Driver (2013) - actor
- Ropable by Ross Gumbley and Allison Horsley, director Ross Gumbley, Court Theatre (2017) - actor
- Black Lover by Stanley Makuwe, director Roy Ward (2020) - actor (Garfield Todd)

=== Film ===
- Fog City (film)
- The Royal Treatment (2023) Netflix
- Absent Without Leave (1992) – Ted
- Bread and Roses (1994) – Pacifist Friend #2
- The Lord of the Rings: The Fellowship of the Ring (2001) – Farmer Maggot
- The Chronicles of Narnia: The Lion, the Witch and the Wardrobe (2005) – Gryphon (voice)
- The Devil Dared Me To (2007) – Butler
- We're Here to Help (2007) – Simon Carr
- Second Hand Wedding (2008) – Red Haired Man
- Jinx Sister (2008) – Laura's Father
- I'm Not Harry Jenson (2009) – Rick
- Mr. Pip (2012) – Ship's doctor
- Romeo and Juliet: A Love Song (2013) – The Prince
- Housebound (2014) – Dennis
- Deathgasm (2015) – Mr. Capenhurst
- Penny Black (2015) – Mike

=== Television ===
- Xena: Warrior Princess (1996–1998) – Deiphobus / Eldon
- A Twist in the Tale (1999) – Rick Irving
- Dark Knight (2000) – Prince John
- Revelations – The Initial Journey (2003) – Jimmy
- Power Rangers Dino Thunder (2004) – Marty the Mackerel
- Power Rangers Mystic Force (2006) – Dr. Tristian
- Agent Anna (2013–2014) – Charles Jordan
- The Brokenwood Mysteries (2016–2025) - Dr Roger Plummer
- Mystic (2021) - Gary
- Beyond the Veil (2022) - D Hilton
- The Gone (2023–2024) - George Anderson
- Madam (2024) - Gagged Man
- Dark City: The Cleaner (2024) - Graham Gallety
- Total Control (2024) - Government Member
- Spartacus: House of Ashur (2025–2026) – Uvidus

=== Voice-over roles ===
- Power Rangers Dino Thunder (2004) – Mad Mackerel (voice)
- Power Rangers S.P.D. (2005) – Professor Mooney (voice)
- Power Rangers Mystic Force (2006) – Matoombo (voice)
- Power Rangers Jungle Fury (2008) – Carnisoar (voice)
- Power Rangers Samurai (2011) – Professor Cog (voice)
- Power Rangers Super Megaforce (2014) – Headridge / Professor Cog (voice)
- Path of Exile (2013) – Cadiro Perandus (voice)
- The Barefoot Bandits (2016-2017) - Bellamy Soddington (voice)
- Power Rangers Beast Morphers (2019) – Burnertron (voice)
