= Joy Womack =

American ballet dancer

- Born: Joy Annabelle Womack; 1994/1995; Beverly Hills, California, U.S.
- Occupation: Ballet dancer
- Partner: Andrew Clay (husband)
- Career
- Former groups: Bolshoi Theatre, Universal Ballet, Boston Ballet, Kremlin Ballet Theatre of Moscow, Astrakhan Opera and Ballet Theatre Ballet du Capitole
- Website: www.joywomack.com

Joy Annabelle Womack is an American ballet dancer. She is the first American woman to graduate from the Bolshoi Ballet Academy’s main training program with a red diploma, and the first American woman to sign a contract with the Bolshoi Ballet. She was a principal dancer with the Universal Ballet and Kremlin Ballet, Astrakhan Opera and Ballet Theatre and got a fixed-term contract with Paris Opera Ballet in January 2023.

== Early life and education ==
Womack was born one of nine children in Beverly Hills, California, and raised in Santa Monica, California and studied under Yvonne Mounsey at the Westside School of Ballet until the age of twelve when her family moved to Austin, Texas. Her parents found her a Russian ballet teacher in the Austin area, and she attended a dance school that specialized in the Vaganova method.

She trained at the Kirov Academy of Ballet, and then attended the Bolshoi Ballet Academy in Moscow, Russia in 2009 after Academy teachers noticed her at that year's summer intensive. She was fifteen years old at the time. During her first year at the Academy, Womack was among a group of students selected to perform for a regular Bolshoi audience in a special gala, along with the stars of the Bolshoi Ballet itself; she performed despite needing surgery for a bone injury. She received the surgery later after a parishioner at her English-language church in Moscow offered to pay.

== Career ==
Some of Womack's classical repertoire includes the roles of Giselle in Giselle, Masha in The Nutcracker, the pas de deux from Diana and Acteon, and Princess Budur in One Thousand and One Nights.

In November 2013, Womack announced in an interview with Izvestia that she was leaving the Bolshoi Ballet, which she claimed was fraught with corruption. During the interview, she made allegations of extortion from an unnamed director in exchange for a solo part in a performance in September of that year. Although some dancers, such as Alexander Petukhov, denied the allegations, stating, "...If she knows something, let her name those people. Why smear the theater like that?", others, such as Natalia Vyskubeno, supported Womack's account. Womack herself described this time as "...like breaking up with your first love."

In 2014, at the age of 19, she became a principal dancer of the Kremlin Ballet Theatre of Moscow. She left the company in 2017. In 2018, she was a principal dancer with the Universal Ballet in Seoul, South Korea. Womack also guest performed in Sofia National Opera and Ballet, Kraków Opera and Ballet, and The Russian State Ballet. She joined the Boston Ballet as an artist in 2019. The following year she joined the Astrakhan Opera and Ballet Theatre as prima ballerina.

Womack founded Project Prima, a supplement company that caters specifically to dancers and performance athletes. As of Oct 2021, Project Prima was no longer active and the URL redirects to Womack's official website. She modeled for Cloud and Victory in 2014. She was a Gaynor Girl Pro Ambassador for Gaynor Minden, a dance wear and ballet brand. In 2020, Gaynor Minden listed Womack as an Artist Ambassador.

Womack appeared in the documentary Joy Womack: The White Swan, made by Dina Burlis, Danila Kuznetsov and Sergey Gavrilov, detailing her journey from a young American girl to becoming prima ballerina of Kremlin Ballet. It debuted in June 2020 at the Marché du Film at Cannes and was released in late 2021.

In 2024, New Zealand filmmaking team James Napier Robertson and Tom Hern released a biopic called Joika, based on Womack's life during her time with the Bolshoi Ballet, with Womack serving as choreographer and consultant. Actress and classically trained dancer Talia Ryder plays Womack, with Womack as her dancing double and trainer. To prepare for the role, Ryder worked with Womack and New York City Ballet principal dancer Daniel Ulbricht. Diane Kruger plays Womack's ballet teacher and mentor in the film. Filming began in Poland in early 2022 and wrapped in Warsaw "almost hours" before Russia invaded Ukraine.

Womack danced with the Paris Opera Ballet as an extra-dancer of the corps de ballet for the Balanchine show in February 2023 and performed at various galas around the world. In 2022 she joined a variety of dancers for Reunited In Dance, a gala organized by Xander Parish for dancers who were displaced due to the Russian invasion of Ukraine.

Since 2022, Joy Womack has worked with Act’ble, an innovative modular system pointe shoe brand, based in Karlsruhe, Germany. In November 2023, Act’ble released a collaborative dance film with Joy Womack titled ‘JOY'.

== Personal life ==
Womack learned to speak fluent Russian while living and working in Russia. She was married to former Bolshoi dancer-choreographer Nikita Ivanov-Goncharov. She is a Christian.

Womack announced her engagement to Andrew Hale Clay on September 30, 2020 via her personal YouTube channel.

== Movies ==
Year	Title	Role	Notes
2013	Searching for Perfection	Self	Short
2017	Home & Family	Self, ballerina	TV series, 1 episode
2021	Joy Womack: The White Swan	Self	Documentary
2023	Joika	Consultant, dance double	

== Awards ==
In 2011 she won the Grand Prix award at the Youth America Grand Prix in Paris, France.

In 2012, Womack was awarded the Grand Prix Award at one of the 13 Youth America Grand Prix semi-finals.

In 2013, she was awarded the Asian Grand Prix Award at the Asian Grand Prix in Hong Kong.

In 2014 she won the Globex Promotion award for Emerging Expressive Talent.

In 2014 she won the Silver Medal Arabesque Ballet Competition in Perm, Russia.

In 2015, she won 1st Prize Ballet Professional & 2nd Prize Contemporary Professional in Bari Ballet Competition Italy.

In July 2016, Womack won silver medal at the International Ballet Competition at Varna, Bulgaria.

In 2017 she won Gold at Korea International Ballet Competition.
