= Shadow in the Cloud =

2020 New Zealand / US action horror film by Roseanne Liang

- Theatrical release poster
- Directed by: Roseanne Liang
- Written by: Max Landis; Roseanne Liang
- Produced by: Brian Kavanaugh-Jones; Kelly McCormick; Tom Hern; Fred Berger
- Starring: Chloë Grace Moretz; Beulah Koale; Taylor John Smith; Callan Mulvey; Nick Robinson
- Cinematography: Kit Fraser
- Edited by: Tom Eagles
- Music by: Mahuia Bridgman-Cooper
- Production companies: Endeavor Content; Rhea Films; Hercules Film Fund; New Zealand Film Commission; Automatik Entertainment; Four Knights Film; Fulcrum Media Finance; Screen Auckland
- Distributed by: Vertical Entertainment; Redbox Entertainment (United States); 387 Distribution (New Zealand)
- Release dates: September 12, 2020 (TIFF); January 1, 2021 (United States)
- Running time: 83 minutes
- Countries: New Zealand; United States
- Language: English
- Box office: $908,792

Shadow in the Cloud is a 2020 action horror film directed by Roseanne Liang, from a screenplay by Liang and Max Landis, starring Chloë Grace Moretz, Beulah Koale, Taylor John Smith, Callan Mulvey and Nick Robinson. It follows a female flight officer on a top-secret mission in the Pacific during the Second World War, who after boarding a Boeing B-17 Flying Fortress, encounters an evil gremlin during the flight.

The film was an international co-production between New Zealand and United States, The film premiered on September 12, 2020, at the 2020 Toronto International Film Festival, where it won the People's Choice Award for Midnight Madness. It was released on January 1, 2021, by Vertical Entertainment and Redbox Entertainment.

== Plot ==
In August 1943, WAAF Flight Officer Maude Garrett is assigned to travel with a top secret package from Auckland, New Zealand, to Samoa. When she arrives at the airbase at night, she wanders the tarmac before suddenly finding herself standing right in front of her transport, an American B-17 bomber named The Fool's Errand. The mixed-nationality Allied crew gives her a mostly derisive welcome, and she is quartered in the empty Sperry ball turret for the takeoff. With no room left for her document valise, she reluctantly allows the only friendly crew member, USAAF dorsal gunner Walter Quaid, to store it. During takeoff, Maude sees another aircraft in the clouds, confirmed by navigator Finch. Pilot Reeves and RNZAF co-pilot Williams question her ability to identify aircraft.

Still riding in the ball turret, Maude sees some sort of winged creature clinging to the underside of the bomber's wing. She reports it, but most of the crew, except tail gunner Beckell, who also sees it, derides her claim. When she is allowed to leave the turret, the hatch malfunctions, trapping her inside. When she reacts indignantly to the crew's comments about her situation, they abandon their attempt to open the stuck hatch and switch off her intercom. After seeing a Japanese aircraft appearing and disappearing in the clouds close to the bomber, she is abruptly attacked by the creature, a gremlin. She fights it off but ends up being injured. When the crew contacts her again to ask what happened, USAAF Scottish radio operator Taggart cuts in telling them that "Maude Garrett" does not exist and is not registered for their flight. When they begin to remove her for questioning, Maude deliberately jams the turret's gears and prepares to defend herself. Suddenly, the Japanese aircraft reappears and opens fire. In the excitement, Maude switches to an American accent as she takes control of the gun turret, shooting down the fighter and winning the crew's grudging respect.

Maude confirms that she truly is a WASP, but admits she is actually married and boarded the B-17 under her maiden name. She refuses to reveal her mission, citing its secrecy. She again sees the gremlin continuing to sabotage the bomber. Eventually, waist gunner Dorn sights it too, but the others disregard his observation. Suspecting Maude's assignment is the cause of their misfortunes, Reeves gives the order to open the bag, which contains an infant, Maude's and Sgt. Quaid's extramarital child. Forced to confess, Maude explains that she was severely mistreated by her husband. She had an affair with Quaid and became pregnant. Deciding not to inform Quaid, Maude faked her assignment to the bomber in order to escape her husband, who is following her and will kill her in his rage over the affair, though it is implied she has already killed him in self-defense due to her sporting cuts and bruises prior to arriving on the flight.

Just as Captain Reeves turns back to the airbase, three Mitsubishi A6M Zero fighters attack and the gremlin boards the bomber, injures Quaid, and kidnaps the infant. When the gremlin appears outside the turret with her baby in the bag, Maude exits the turret and fires her handgun at it, driving it off. The bag is now hanging precariously from the closest engine nacelle. Risking a perilous climb under the wing, Maude is able to retrieve her child and reboard the bomber through the now shot away ball turret opening. The gremlin attacks again, throwing Taggart out of the bomber before Maude can eject it. When Reeves, Finch, and Dorn are killed by additional Japanese machine gun fire, Maude takes command and brings down the heavily damaged bomber roughly but safely in a controlled crash landing on land. As an enamored Quaid impulsively tries to propose to Maude, the gremlin reappears on the ground and tries to snatch the baby once again, but Maude is finally able to kill the creature, ending the threat. She and the remaining survivors, breastfeeding her baby as she watches The Fool's Errand burn and explode.

== Cast ==
- Chloë Grace Moretz as Maude Garrett
- Beulah Koale as Flight Lieutenant Anton Williams, co-pilot
- Taylor John Smith as Staff Sergeant Walter Quaid, dorsal gunner
- Callan Mulvey as Captain John Reeves, pilot
- Benedict Wall as Private Tommy Dorn, waist gunner
- Byron Coll as Technical Sergeant Terrence Taggart, radio operator
- Joe Witkowski as Lieutenant Bradley Finch, navigator
- Nick Robinson as Private Stu Beckell, tail gunner

== Production ==
In January 2019, it was announced that Chloë Grace Moretz had joined the cast, with Roseanne Liang directing from a screenplay by Max Landis. Brian Kavanaugh-Jones, Fred Berger, Kelly McCormick and Tom Hern would serve as producers under their Automatik Entertainment and Four Knights Film banner, respectively. In April 2019, Moretz announced the script had been rewritten several times following allegations against Landis of sexual assault. Landis was also removed as a producer, with Liang rewriting the film. Due to Writers Guild of America rules, Landis receives credit for the script. That month, Nick Robinson joined the cast. In the original script, Moretz's character was named Maude Gardner after Maude Garrett, who was acquainted with Landis at the time of writing. The character's surname had to be changed for legal reasons and without knowing the initial namesake, the cast and crew unanimously decided on Garrett for the surname.

During development, for inspiration, Liang turned to Locke (2013), a film with one character set in one location, and Aliens (1986).

Principal photography began in June 2019 in Auckland, New Zealand.

In a prologue to Shadow in the Cloud, an animated training film from the United States Army Air Forces depicts the havoc a gremlin—a metaphor for problems caused by inattention and/or negligence—can produce for the unwary or complacent airman during wartime. When the film continues, the gremlin is depicted as a living, malevolent creature. During the end credits, archival footage is shown of women serving in the British and American air forces in the Second World War.

== Release ==
Shadow in the Cloud had its world premiere at the Toronto International Film Festival on September 12, 2020. Shortly after, Vertical Entertainment and Redbox Entertainment acquired distribution rights to the film. Shadow in the Cloud was released in the United States on January 1, 2021, although the release was limited due to the COVID-19 pandemic.

== Reception ==
At the review aggregator website Rotten Tomatoes, 77% of 131 critics gave Shadow in the Cloud a positive review, with an average rating of 6.4/10. The website's critical consensus reads: "Part creature feature, part war movie, and part social commentary, Shadow in the Cloud doesn't always blend its ingredients evenly—but it's frequently pulpy fun". According to Metacritic, which assigned Shadow in the Cloud a weighted average score of 66 out of 100 based on 19 critics, having received "generally favorable reviews".

Nick Allen of RogerEbert.com wrote that Shadow in the Cloud was "a sincere but silly mash-up of WWII dogfights, gremlin chaos, and feminism in action", and gave it two and a half out of four stars.

The film ranks on Rotten Tomatoes' Best Horror Movies of 2021.

=== Awards and honours ===
Shadow in the Cloud received a Grolsch People's Choice Award for Director Roseanne Liang in the "Midnight Madness" session in the 2020 Toronto International Film Festival. Liang also won the "Director to Watch" award at the 2021 Palm Springs International Film Festival.
