= Tomasz Naumiuk =

Polish cinematographer (born 1981)

- Born: 23 December 1981 (age 44); Olsztyn, Poland
- Occupation: Cinematographer

Tomasz Naumiuk (born 23 December 1981) is a Polish cinematographer.

He graduated from the Łódź Film School.

== Filmography ==
- 39 and a Half (2008)
- I pół (2009)
- Być jak Kazimierz Deyna (2012)
- Drużyna (2014)
- The Border (2014)
- Disco polo (2015)
- Amok (2017)
- Nina (2018)
- Diagnosis (2018), episodes 1–13
- Mr. Jones (2019)
- The Thaw (2022–)
- Absolute Beginners (2023–)
- Joika (2023)
- Green Border (2023)
- Imago (2023)
- Knights of the Zodiac (2023)
- Rzeczy niezbędne (2024)
- Franz (2025)
- Winter of the Crow (2025)
- Północ południe (2025)

Source.

== Awards ==
- Award for cinematography for the film Być jak Kazimierz Deyna (Being Like Kazimierz Deyna) at the Koszalin Debut Film Festival “Young and Film” (2012)
- Award for cinematography for the film Disco Polo at the Koszalin Debut Film Festival “Young and Film” (2015)
- Grand Prix in the Polish film competition at the International Film Festival of the Art of Cinematography “Camerimage” in Bydgoszcz for cinematography for the film Nina (2018)
- Nominated for the Polish Film Award for the Best Cinematography for Mr. Jones (2020)
- Nominated for the Polish Film Award for the Best Cinematography for Green Border (2023)
- Award for the best cinematography for the film Franz at the Polish Film Festival (2025)

Source.
