= Talia Ryder =

American actress (born 2002)

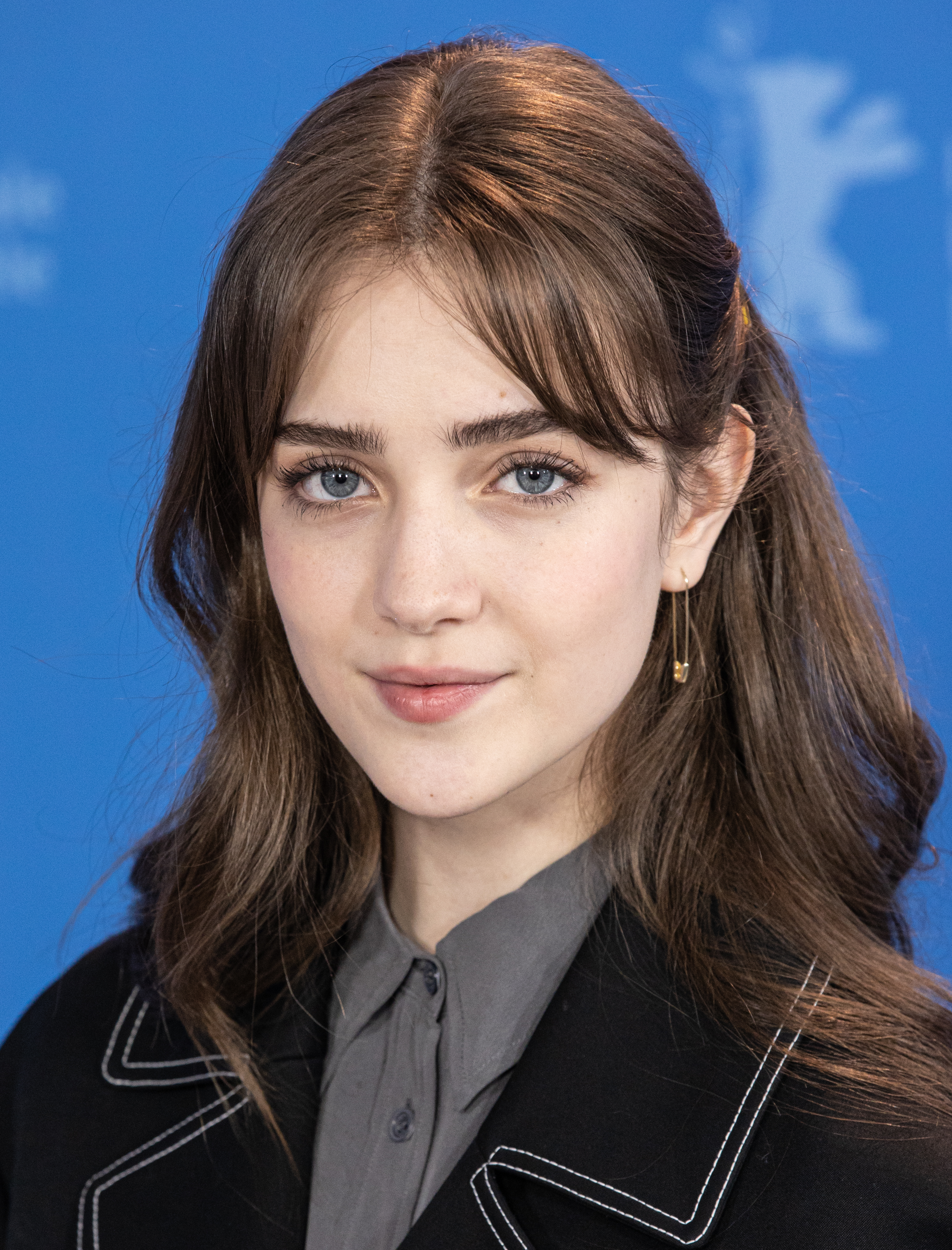
- Ryder in 2020
- Born: August 16, 2002 (age 24); Buffalo, New York
- Occupation: Actress
- Years active: 2015–present

Talia Ryder (born August 16, 2002) is an American stage and film actress. She made her feature film debut as Skylar in Eliza Hittman's critically acclaimed independent drama film Never Rarely Sometimes Always (2020) earning her nominations for an Independent Spirit Award and Critics' Choice Movie Award. She has since had leading roles in the Netflix romantic drama Hello, Goodbye, and Everything in Between (2022), and the surrealist road film The Sweet East (2023).

Ryder is also known for her supporting roles in the musical drama West Side Story (2021), the teen comedy Do Revenge (2022), and the comedy-drama Dumb Money (2023). On stage, she acted in the Broadway musical Matilda the Musical (2015–2016) and the Off-Broadway play How to Defend Yourself (2023).

== Early life and education ==
Talia Ryder was born August 16, 2002, in Buffalo, New York. Her younger sister Mimi has a career as a musical actress with a title role in Matilda the Musical. She also has a younger brother. Talia graduated from high school in 2020.

== Career ==
=== 2015–2018: On stage ===
Ryder was 12 years old when she and her family went to see the Broadway musical Matilda the Musical based on the Roald Dahl's 1988 children's book of the same name. She and her sister Mimi were inspired to audition for the show, and she was ultimately cast as Hortensia, a role which started her professional acting career. Her family moved to New York City where she performed the role from 2015 to 2016. Ryder has said that her background was mostly in dance, but she started developing her skills in stage acting. In 2016, Ryder along with a cast of 75 kids took part in the short film Broadway Kids Against Bullying: I Have a Voice, directed by Jason Milstein, and its charity single composed by Frank Wildhorn, to support Nobully.org.

=== 2019–2023: Never Rarely Sometimes Always, The Sweet East ===
In 2019, she was cast as Autumn's cousin Skylar in Eliza Hittman's indie drama film Never Rarely Sometimes Always, where the two girls travel to New York City so that Autumn (Sidney Flanigan) can get an abortion without parental consent. The film premiered at the Sundance Film Festival and was later released in theatres and on video on demand shortly afterwards in March 2020. For her performance Ryder received nominations for the Independent Spirit Award for Best Supporting Female and the Critics' Choice Movie Award for Best Young Performer. In 2019, she was also cast as part of the Jets Chorus in Steven Spielberg's film adaptation of West Side Story. In 2021, she had a starring role in Olivia Rodrigo's music video for "Deja Vu".

In 2022, Ryder had a starring role as Clare in the film Hello, Goodbye, and Everything in Between and played Gabbi Broussard in the hit Netflix movie Do Revenge. In 2023 she had a leading role in the surrealist comedy film The Sweet East directed by Sean Price Williams. Catherine Bray of Variety wrote, "Talia Ryder, lead actor in The Sweet East, is a star. There’s something of Kristen Stewart about her, not merely in terms of physical resemblance, but more in her gift for not just acting but reacting." That same year she acted in Liliana Padilla's Off-Broadway play How to Defend Yourself at the New York Theatre Workshop. Tim Teeman of The Daily Beast described the production as being "Profound, funny, and shocking" adding that "one hopes [it] graduates to a bigger stage—truly, it should go to Broadway". Also in 2023 she had a supporting role in the comedy film Dumb Money directed by Craig Gillespie.

=== 2024–present: Junk, Joika, Honey, Don't! ===
Ryder had a supporting role as a drug addict in the comedy-drama Junk starring David Schwimmer, which premiered at the Sundance Film Festival in 2024 under the title Little Death. Critic Lovia Gyarkye of The Hollywood Reporter wrote of her performance, "Ryder, who has consistently proven her ability to carry a film with Never Rarely Sometimes Always and The Sweet East, predictably shines here." Esther Zuckerman of IndieWire noted that "Schwimmer is outshined by Ryder" and added that she never plays into the troupes of playing an addict but rather, "Ryder probes into [her character's] vulnerabilities, so when we realize the extent of her reliance on substances, it’s heartbreaking rather than obvious". She starred as ballet dancer Joy Womack in the 2023 James Napier Robertson-directed drama film Joika acting opposite Diane Kruger. In 2024, she was cast in Ethan Coen's comedic film Honey Don't!, which filmed in New Mexico. She directed three music videos for the film's soundtrack, "In The Sun She Lies", "ODDWAD" and "Girl"; she featured in the latter two under the alias "Dixie Normus".

In 2025 she performed in the Anne Imhof-directed Doom: House of Hope, a modern-day political interpretation of William Shakespeare's tragedy Romeo and Juliet at the Park Avenue Armory. Alex Greenberger of ARTnews panned the production calling it "glib, dull, and hopeless" adding, "I left Doom yearning for art with a pulse". Greenberger noted Ryder, writing, "the talented actress Talia Ryder, intoned the Jeremih song 'Paradise' live."

In 2026, Ryder was cast as June Allyson for the untitled Fred Astaire biopic, starring Tom Holland.

== Acting credits ==
=== Films ===
List of film roles
Year	Title	Role	Notes	Ref.
2020	Never Rarely Sometimes Always	Skylar		
2021	West Side Story	Tessa		
2022	Master	Amelia		
2022	Hello, Goodbye, and Everything in Between	Clare		
2022	Do Revenge	Gabbi Broussard		
2023	The Sweet East	Lillian		
2023	Dumb Money	Harmony Williams		
2023	Joika	Joy Womack		
2024	Junk	Karla		
2025	Honey Don't!	Corinne		
2026	In Memoriam	Maura		
2027	4 Kids Walk Into a Bank	Paige	Post-production	
TBA	Preppy		Filming	

=== Television ===
Year	Title	Role	Notes
2016	Sesame Street	Daughter	Episode: "Supermom"
TBA	Mr. & Mrs. Smith	Mrs. Smith	Season 2; filming

=== Theater ===
Year	Title	Role	Venue	Ref.
2015–2016	Matilda the Musical	Hortensia	Shubert Theatre, Broadway	
2023	How to Defend Yourself	Brandi	New York Theatre Workshop, Off-Broadway	
2025	Doom: House of Hope	Juliet	Park Avenue Armory, Off-Broadway	

=== Music videos ===
List of music video credits
Year	Title	Artist	Director	Ref.
2021	"Deja Vu"	Olivia Rodrigo	Allie Avital	
2025	"How Does It Feel?"	The Kid LAROI	Calmatic	
2025	"In the Sun She Lies"	Lace Manhattan	Self	
2025	"ODDWAD"	Lace Manhattan	Self	
2025	"Girl"	Lace Manhattan	Self	

== Accolades ==
List of awards and nominations received by Talia Ryder
Award	Year	Category	Work	Result	Ref.
Greater Western New York Film Critics Association	2020	Breakthrough Performer	Never Rarely Sometimes Always	Nominated	
Indiana Film Journalists Association	2020	Best Supporting Actress	Never Rarely Sometimes Always	Nominated	
Chicago Indie Critics	2021	Best Supporting Actress	Never Rarely Sometimes Always	Nominated	
Critics' Choice Movie Awards	2021	Best Young Actor/Actress	Never Rarely Sometimes Always	Nominated	
Independent Spirit Awards	2021	Best Supporting Female	Never Rarely Sometimes Always	Nominated	
International Cinephile Society	2021	Best Supporting Actress	Never Rarely Sometimes Always	Nominated	
Online Film Critics Society	2021	Best Supporting Actress	Never Rarely Sometimes Always	Nominated	
Seattle Film Critics Society	2021	Best Supporting Actress	Never Rarely Sometimes Always	Nominated	
Seattle Film Critics Society	2021	Best Youth Performance	Never Rarely Sometimes Always	Nominated	
Washington D.C. Area Film Critics Association	2021	Best Youth Performance	Never Rarely Sometimes Always	Nominated	
