= Joika =

2023 film by James Napier Robertson

- Directed by: James Napier Robertson
- Screenplay by: James Napier Robertson
- Produced by: Paul Green; Tom Hern; Belindalee Hope
- Starring: Diane Kruger; Talia Ryder; Tomasz Kot
- Cinematography: Tomasz Naumiuk
- Edited by: Chris Plummer; Martin Brinker
- Music by: Dana Lund
- Production companies: Ingenious Media; RBF Productions; New Zealand Film Commission; Polish Film Institute; Department of Post; Moderator Inwestycje Group
- Release date: 2023 (Deauville American Film Festival)
- Running time: 110 minutes
- Countries: New Zealand; Poland
- Language: English

Joika (alternative title The American) is a 2023 New Zealand–Polish drama about American ballerina Joy Womack training at the prestigious Moscow Bolshoi Theatre. It was written and directed by James Napier Robertson and stars Diane Kruger and Talia Ryder.

== Plot ==
Fifteen-year old aspiring American ballerina Joy Womack is accepted into the prestigious Moscow Bolshoi Theatre. Womack has ambitions of becoming a Prima Ballerina at the Bolshoi Company. Womack and her fellow ballerinas train under the tutelage of Tatiyana Volkova, who is a strict and demanding instructor. During the course of her training, Womack develops a rivalry with a Russian girl named Natasha, who shares Womack's ambitions of becoming the academy's Prima Ballerina. Womack also befriends a Russian boy named Nikolay Lebedev.

Joy and Natasha are injured by someone planting glass in their shoes. After a night of partying, Womack is late to a class after Natasha sabotages her alarm clock. In response, Tatiyana removes Womack from the top girl's ranking on the Ballerina list for an upcoming Bolshoi production. However, Womack finds a loophole by entering into a marriage of convenience with Lebedev. As a result, Volkova is forced under Russian law to include Womack's name on the Ballerina list.

Concerned about their daughter's well being and lack of contact, Womack's parents Eleanor and Clay travel to Moscow. They unsuccessfully attempt to convince her to annul her marriage to Lebedev and return to the United States. Unwilling to relinquish her ambitions, Womack decides to remain in Russia to continue her training. Womack later moves into Lebedev's flat, which he shares with his mother Valeriya Lebedeve.

Womack turns to a wealthy sponsor named Andrei Vadys, who tries to exploit her, but after she denies his advances, she is blacklisted from the Bolshoi. After Nikolay abuses Womack as well, she separates from him. Volkova visits Womack to offer her a role in the Varna International Ballet Competition. While Womack is initially wary, Volkova manages to convince Womack by showing her softer side and sharing her past career as a ballerina. During the show, Womack hurts one of her legs. Despite the pleas of her mother Eleanor, Womack insists on continuing with the show, which helps launches her ballerina career.

== Production ==
=== Development and writing ===
Joika was written and directed by James Napier Robertson. According to Robertson, he had initially not been interested in the producer's original pitch "Rocky with pointe shoes" but changed his mind after watching a New York Times short documentary about Joy Womack. After meeting Womack in Los Angeles, Robertson said that he felt inspired by her personal charisma and work ethic to helm the film project.

=== Casting ===
Talia Ryder was cast as Joy Womack while Diane Kruger was cast as Volkova. Napier Robertson had cast Ryder as Womack due to her performance in the 2020 teen abortion drama Never Rarely Sometimes Always. To prepare for the role, Ryder trained with Womack and New York City Ballet principal dancer Daniel Ulbricht. Supporting cast members included Oleg Ivenko, Natalia Osipova, Tomasz Kot, Charlotte Ubben, Natasha Alderslade, Karolina Gruszka and Borys Szyc.

=== Filming ===
Filming began in Poland in February 2022 and finished in Warsaw. The film was produced by Paul Green, Tom Hern, Belindalee Hope and Paula Munoz Vega. Luke Rivett, Charlotte Ubben, Robert Walak, Phil Rose, Peter Touche, Andrea Scarso, Laurie Ross, Michael Cerny served as executive producers. Tomasz Naumiuk serves as cinematographer while Dana Lund composed the film's music score. Womack choreographed the film's ballerina scenes.

The film was produced with support from Ingenious Media, RBF Productions, the New Zealand Film Commission, the Polish Film Institute, the Department of Post and the Moderator Inwestycje Group.

== Release and reception ==
In 2022, Joika's distribution rights in Australia and New Zealand were sold to The Reset Collective, Paradiso in the Benelux, Ascot Elite in Switzerland, Ten Letters in the Commonwealth of Independent States and Baltic States, Square One in Germany, Eagle in Italy, Vertice in Spain, Spentzos in Greece, United King in Israel, Filmfinity in South Africa, Nos Lusomundo in Portugal and Front Row in the Middle East. In February 2024, Vertical Entertainment acquired the distribution rights for the United States, United Kingdom and Ireland.

The film first premiered at the 2023 Deauville American Film Festival. It was also screened at the 2024 Palm Springs International Film Festival and the 2024 Santa Barbara International Film Festival between 15–16 February 2024.

=== Critical response ===
Liam Maguren of Flicks gave Joika a favourable review, opining that the film "delivers plenty of squirm-inducing suspense and a compelling moral quagmire." Maguren praised writer-director Napier Robertson and also praised the performances of the main cast members Talia Ryder and Diane Kruger, likening their partnership to the student-teacher relationship in Damien Chazelle's Whiplash. He also praised the film's choreography and handheld cinematography of Tomasz Naumiuk.

The Dominion Post gave the film 4 and a 1/2 stars and calling it "astonishingly beautiful", and the Radio Times gave it 4 stars, calling it "a rich, visual feast contrasted with a bitter, edgy core and excellent ensemble
