= I'm Not Harry Jenson =

- Directed by: James Napier Robertson
- Written by: James Napier Robertson
- Produced by: Tom Hern; Edward Sampson
- Starring: Gareth Reeves; Jinny Lee Story; Renato Bartolomei; Tom Hern; Cameron Rhodes; Ian Mune; Marshall Napier; Ilona Rodgers James Napier Robertson
- Cinematography: Rhys Duncan
- Edited by: James Napier Robertson
- Music by: Peter Hobbs
- Production company: Six String Pictures
- Distributed by: Rialto (New Zealand)
- Release date: 17 July 2009 (NZIFF)
- Country: New Zealand
- Language: English

I'm Not Harry Jenson is a micro-budget theatrical New Zealand film released in 2009. It is the first feature film written and directed by James Napier Robertson. It was produced by Tom Hern through the production company Six String Pictures.

== Cast ==
- Gareth Reeves as Stanley
- Jinny Lee Story as Marissa
- Renato Bartolomei as Colby
- Tom Hern as Kevin
- Cameron Rhodes as Rick
- Ian Mune as Bill
- Marshall Napier as Tom
- Ilona Rodgers as Margaret
- James Napier Robertson as interviewer

== Release and reception ==
I'm Not Harry Jenson premiered at the 2009 New Zealand International Film Festival, where it received strong reviews and sold out screenings, and held its international premiere at the 2009 Shanghai International Film Festival.

The National Radio Film Review gave it 4 stars, calling it "a remarkable result, doesn't feel like a feature debut but a thriller from the hands of an experienced player...an impressive piece of work".

Voxy Movie Review gave it "a very solid 7.5 out of 10", putting emphasis on the "great writing, directing and in particular acting."

The New Zealand Herald gave the film three stars, calling it a "small-scale whodunnit ... but shows how smart writing and good acting can compensate for a tiny budget". The review stated "the young writer/director achieves moments of real tension" with "some wonderful lines", and the reveal was a "scene of some mastery".

It was released nationwide in theatres throughout New Zealand in 2010, but failed to do much business at the box office.
