= How to Defend Yourself =

2019 play by Liliana Padilla

- Original language: English
- Written by: Liliana Padilla
- Subject: Self-defense; Sexual assault Campus sexual assault

Premiere
- Date: March 13, 2019
- Place: Actors Theatre of Louisville

How to Defend Yourself is a 2019 play by Liliana Padilla. The play was produced by the Actors Theatre of Louisville in 2019 and Victory Gardens Theater in Chicago in 2020. It premiered Off-Broadway at New York Theatre Workshop in 2023. The play was the winner of the 2019 Yale Drama Series Prize.

The play takes place in a college gym, where sorority leader Brandi leads a self-defense workshop, organized in response to the recent sexual assault of sorority sister Susannah. As the students learn the tenets of fending off attackers and how not to "be a victim", they begin to channel their own rage, anxieties, trauma, confusion, and desires.

== Background ==
Liliana Padilla began writing How to Defend Yourself in 2016, the year before the MeToo movement went mainstream, while pursuing their playwriting MFA at the University of California, San Diego. Padilla's teacher Deborah Stein gave them the prompt to write a political play. Padilla pitched two plays: a surrealist play about capitalism, and How to Defend Yourself. Stein encouraged Padilla to pursue the latter, due to it giving Padilla a stronger reaction.

Padilla wished to avoid typical depictions of rape narratives in theater, instead viewing how a collective reacts to pain and violence. Padilla describes "rape culture" as the underlying force in the play, though the term is never actually used in the script: Padilla defines rape culture as "the systemic belief that you need to dominate another being in order to have power. That core belief spirals into different behaviors that create the conditions for violence."

== Plot summary ==
A self-defense workshop is organized by Brandi, the VP of the Zeta Chi sorority, and Kara, the sisterhood chair, in response to the violent sexual assault of sorority member Susannah at an Alpha Epsilon fraternity party. In attendance are Diana, an outgoing first-year who wishes to channel her fighting spirit, Mojdeh, Diana's childhood best friend who is hoping to eventually join Zeta Chi, and Nikki, a shy wallflower who wishes to build her inner strength. Also joining are two members of Alpha Epsilon: Andy, who can be somewhat insensitive but is overall well-meaning in his fight against rape culture, and Eggo, who is confused by consent culture after a complicated breakup. Brandi leads the class in exercises and various fighting techniques, but struggles to control the more discussion-based aspects of the workshop due to her own mixed feelings on sex.

Mojdeh, who is jealous of Diana's perceived sexual promiscuity, tries to come into her own at college by joining dating apps and hoping to improve her social standing through the class. Before one class, she tells an elaborate story of her date with another student, involving them showering together and him treating her well, only to find that “it didn’t fit” when they tried to have sex. Privately, however, Mojdeh admits to Diana that she lied about most of the details, and that it was actually humiliating. As she goes on about how no one will desire her in college, Diana kisses her in an attempt to make her feel desired. Mojdeh rejects Diana, claiming she is not attracted to her, and later blows her off after class to go home with Andy.

Kara and Brandi come into conflict over Kara's behavior in class, from derailing a discussion on consent by describing a desire to be "used" during sex, to showing up hungover and refusing to participate. After being forced to stay behind when Brandi goes to visit Susannah at the hospital, Kara goads Diana into hitting her before breaking down and revealing she encouraged Susannah to sleep with one of her eventual rapists after she herself had rough sex with him, questioning if she gave him a pass to rape Susannah. Diana tries to comfort her, telling her it is "not that hard to[...] not rape someone."

Nikki seems to grow the most from the class, using Brandi's techniques to try to unlock her inner strength. However, her progress comes to a halt when she is stalked and physically assaulted on the way to workshop, and none of the methods worked as her attacker was still much larger and stronger than her. She storms out of the gym after telling the group this, claiming the class is futile in preventing assault. As the other students leave to check on her, Brandi tries to defend the effectiveness of the techniques, but struggles to find the words to justify her reasoning as she breaks down over her own repressed sexual trauma.

In a final, surreal sequence, flashbacks of the cast attending parties in college, high school, and middle school are shown, before a final flashback of an elementary school birthday party where a six-year-old Susannah, played by a young child, makes a wish.

== Productions ==
How to Defend Yourself was first presented at the Wagner New Play Festival 2018 at University of California, San Diego while Padilla was pursuing their playwriting MFA, in a production directed by Kim Rubenstein running from May 11 to May 17. It premiered at the Humana Festival of New American Plays at the Actors Theatre of Louisville in 2019, directed by Marti Lyons and running from March 13 to April 7. It then played at Chicago's Victory Gardens Theater from January 24 to February 23, 2020, again directed by Lyons in a co-production with the Actors Theatre of Louisville.

How to Defend Yourself won the 13th Annual Yale Drama Series Prize in 2019, which led to a reading at Lincoln Center's Claire Tow Theater on March 3, 2020, directed by Rachel Chavkin.

The play premiered Off-Broadway at New York Theatre Workshop in 2023, with previews beginning February 22 prior to a March 13 opening, playing for a strictly limited run to April 2. The production was co-directed by Padilla, Chavkin, and Steph Paul, who previously served as the movement director for the Actors Theatre and Victory Gardens productions. The cast included Jayson Lee reprising his role from the Victory Gardens production and Gabriela Ortega reprising her role from the earlier Humana Festival production. Ariana Mahallati was the only cast member to appear in all major productions of the play, including its premiere at UC San Diego.

== Characters and original cast ==
Role	UC San Diego (2018)	Humana Festival (2019)	Victory Gardens (2020)	Off-Broadway (2023)
Diana	Fedra Ramirez	Gabriela Ortega	Isa Arciniegas	Gabriela Ortega
Mojdeh	Ariana Mahallati	Ariana Mahallati	Ariana Mahallati	Ariana Mahallati
Nikki	Molly Adea	Molly Adea	Andrea San Miguel	Amaya Braganza
Brandi	Andrea Van Den Boogaard	Anna Crivelli	Anna Crivelli	Talia Ryder
Kara	Mary Rose Branick	Abby Leigh Hufstettler	Netta Walker	Sarah Marie Rodriguez
Andy	Garrett Schulte	David Ball	Ryan McBride	Sebastian Delascasas
Eggo	Trevor Rinzler	Jonathan Moises Olivaires	Jayson Lee	Jayson Lee
Susannah	—N/a	Phoenix Gilmore	Janessa Wu	Teagan Meredith

- Diana – 18, a Mexican-American student and the childhood best friend of Mojdeh. Obsessed with guns, and never afraid to go first. She loves confrontation except when she is the one who has made a mistake. She has a promiscuous sexual history, which puts her in conflict with the less-experienced Mojdeh.
- Mojdeh – 18, an Iranian-American student who is desperate to lose her virginity and get into a sorority. She desires being wanted, and looks to others to know what is cool.
- Nikki – 20, person of color, a wallflower with a vivid inner world. Over the course of the class, she begins to find her strength, but her boldness soon leads her to danger.
- Brandi – 21, white, the vice president of the sorority and a valedictorian, with a black belt in karate. She is obsessed with self-defense and never feeling vulnerable, heavily implied to be due to some past sexual trauma.
- Kara – 21, person of color, the sisterhood chair of the sorority and Susannah's best friend. She maintains an air of humor and wit, but hides her own guilt over events that may have led to Susannah's rape.
- Andy – 21, white, a varsity athlete and leader in the Alpha Epsilon fraternity. He can be insensitive, but he is earnest in his efforts to fight rape culture. He feels guilt as he may have witnessed Susannah's assault but did not intervene because he did not realize it was non-consensual.
- Eggo – 20, person of color, a fraternity member who is confused by consent culture and terrified of rejection. Much of his confusion was caused by a previous partner breaking up with him due to his failure to "surprise" her in bed, leading him to question if there is a difference between sex that is a surprise and sex that is assault.
- Susannah – The largely unseen victim whose sexual assault sets off the events of the play. She only appears at the end, aged 6.

== Reception ==
The Victory Gardens production was received warmly by Chicago theater critics. Chris Jones of the Chicago Tribune praised the play for dealing with a charged topic through complex characters, noting the show's ultimately optimistic tone despite its dark subject matter. Sheri Flanders writing for the Chicago Sun-Times described the play as "thoughtfully written", noting its focus on community reactions to sexual assault as opposed to the perpetrator and victim.

Reviewing the Off-Broadway premiere, Thom Geier of TheWrap described the play as "astonishing", praising the choices of the three co-directors as well as Padilla's depiction of the lack of clear direction for Generation Z members in making intimate connections. In a mixed review, Maya Phillips of The New York Times praised the character dynamics, the performances of the cast, and the directors' stagecraft in the play's more surreal moments, but found it difficult to fully connect with characters due to the play rarely lingering on a single character for long.
