= Marshall Napier =

New Zealand-born actor (1951–2022)

- Born: James Marshall Napier; 22 October 1951; Lower Hutt, New Zealand
- Died: 14 August 2022 (aged 70); Canberra, Australian Capital Territory, Australia
- Occupations: Actor, playwright, graphic artist
- Children: 3, including Jessica
- Relatives: James Napier Robertson (nephew)

James Marshall Napier (22 October 1951 – 14 August 2022) was a New Zealand-born character actor, playwright and graphic artist. He is known for a succession of strong supporting roles in Australasian films and television shows. He also had a notable stage career.

== Biography ==
Napier grew up in the city of Lower Hutt and was educated at Hutt Valley High School. He is the father of James Reuben Napier, actress Jessica Napier, and Rose Napier. He is the uncle of film director James Napier Robertson.

Before becoming an actor, Napier worked variously as a labourer, factory hand, and truck driver. He also spent a year studying graphic design at the Wellington Polytechnic. He landed his first professional acting job in 1975, at Wellington's Downstage Theatre.

In 1988, he moved with his wife and two young children to Australia, hoping to further his acting career. He soon became an established name in film, theatre, and television. His play Freak Winds has been performed in Australia, New Zealand, United States and Canada; other plays have been broadcast on Australia's ABC radio.

His starring role in Bellbird (2019) resulted in the film receiving awards at several international film festivals.

== Death ==
Napier died from brain cancer on 14 August 2022 in Canberra at the age of 70.

== Theatre ==
=== As performer ===
Year	Title	Role	Type
1971	Marat/Sade	Jaques Roux	Studio Workshop
1972	The Day Flanagan Died	Berney Flanagan	Studio Workshop
1973	Major Barbara	Bill Walker	Unity Theatre, Wellington
1975	Bully	Pete	Downstage Theatre, NZ
1976	Ubu Roi	Captain MacNure	Downstage Theatre, NZ
1976	Three Sisters	Rode	Downstage Theatre, NZ
1976	Othello	Soldier	Downstage Theatre, NZ
1976	Happy Birthday, Wanda June	Colonel 'Looseleaf' Harper	Downstage Theatre, NZ
1977	The Tooth of Crime	Hoss	Unity Theatre, Wellington
1978	Twelfth Night	Sir Toby Belch	Centrepoint Theatre, NZ
1978	The Resistible Rise of Arturo Ui	Gigi / Dogsborough	Circa Theatre, NZ
1978	The One Day of the Year	Alf	Four Seasons Theatre
1978	Huffers		Tour
1979	Stiff Bix Kabaret	Various	Rock Theatre
1980	Steel Heels	Various	Unity Theatre, Wellington
1981	The Dumb Waiter	Ben	Tour
1982	The Duchess of Malfi	Ferdinand	Circa Theatre, NZ
1983	Tooth and Claw	Mime	Downstage Theatre, NZ
1984	Insignificance	The Senator	Circa Theatre, NZ
1985	Country Cops	Waddell	Circa Theatre, NZ
1986	Loose Connections	Rick Thomas	Downstage Theatre, NZ
1991	Diving for Pearls	Den	Belvoir Street Theatre
1994	All Souls	Joe	Stables Theatre with Griffin Theatre Company
1996	A View from the Bridge	Eddie Carbone	Belvoir Street Theatre
1996	Simpatico	Carter	Wharf Theatre with STC
1996	Speaking in Tongues	Leon / Nick	Stables Theatre with Griffin Theatre Company
1997	The Herbal Bed	Dr John Hall	Wharf Theatre with STC
1997	Waiting for Godot	Vladimir / Estragon	Q Theatre
2000	Alarms and Excursions	Actor A	Ensemble Theatre
2000	Freak Winds	Ernest	Old Fitzroy Theatre with Hydra Theatre Company
2002	Angel City	Wheeler	Old Fitzroy Theatre
2006	Freak Winds	Ernest	Arclight Theater, New York
2008	Frost/Nixon	Nixon	Fairfax Studio with MTC
2009	The Birthday Party	Goldberg	Fairfax Studio with MTC
2010	The Power of Yes	Howard Davies & various	Belvoir Street Theatre
2010	The Schelling Point	Kubrick	Old Fitzroy Theatre
2011	In the Next Room (or The Vibrator Play)	Mr Daldry	Sydney Opera House, Southbank Theatre Melbourne, Riverside Theatres Parramatta with STC
2011	Stainless Steel Rat	Mark Stephens / Eric J Holder Jnr / Journalist	Seymour Centre with Harrison Productions
2012	The Gift	Ed	Auckland Theatre Company
2013	Cat on a Hot Tin Roof	Big Daddy	Belvoir Street Theatre, Theatre Royal, Sydney
2013	All My Sons	Joe Keller	Eternity Playhouse, Sydney, Darlinghurst Theatre
2015–17	The Present	Ivan	Chekhov's Platonov adapted by Andrew Upton with STC & Broadway tour

=== As crew ===
Year	Title	Role	Type
2006	Freak Winds	Director / Playwright	Arclight Theater, New York

== Filmography ==
=== Film ===
Year	Title	Role	Notes
2022	Northspur	Summers	
2020	Earl's Town	Earl	Short film
2019	Bellbird	Ross	Feature film
2019	Little Monsters	Army General	Feature film
2016	The Light Between Oceans	Mr Couglan	Feature film
2016	Down Under	Graham Sheather	Feature film
2013	Inside	The Visiting Doctor	Short film
2012	Jack Irish: Bad Debts	Father Gorman	TV movie
2011	Underbelly Files: Tell Them Lucifer was Here	Chief Commissioner Neil Comrie	TV movie
2011	Panic at Rock Island	Paul Thorpe	TV movie
2010	Griff the Invisible	Benson	Feature film
2010	The Clinic	Officer Marvin Underwood	Feature film
2010	I Love You Too	Mechanic	Feature film
2009	I'm Not Harry Jenson	Tom	Feature film
2007	The Water Horse: Legend of the Deep	Sgt Strunk	Feature film
2004	Sold Out	J. Edgar Crippen	Short film
2004	Get Rich Quick	Turf O'Keefe	
2003	Travelling Light	Don Ferris	Feature film
2003	Bad Eggs	Doug Gillespie	Feature film
2002	Stuffed Bunny	Priest	Short film
2002	Black and White	Prison Warden	Feature film
2002	New Skin	Captain Jip	
2001	My Husband, My Killer	John Radij	TV movie
2001	Jet Set	Mr Birkin	
2000	The Shirt	Mike Hughes	
2000	Muggers	Charles Lawrence	Feature film
1999	Airtight	Norscrum	TV movie
1999	In a Savage Land	Geoffrey Hallerton	Feature film
1999	Strange Planet	Robert	Feature film
1998	13 Gantry Row	Blake	TV movie
1998	The Sugar Factory	Mr Berne	Feature film
1998	Meteorites	Cass Cassidy	TV movie
1997	Diana & Me	Bank Manager	Feature film
1996	Dead Heart	Sgt. Oakes	Feature film
1996	Children of the Revolution	Brendan Shaw	Feature film
1996	Race the Sun	Mr Cronin	Feature film
1995	Swimming Lessons	Jim	TV movie
1995	Babe	Chairman of Judges	Feature film
1994	Spider and Rose	Henderson	Feature film
1994	Paperback Romance (aka Lucky Break)	George LePine	Feature film
1993	Shotgun Wedding	Dave Green	Feature film
1991	Flirting	Mr. Rupert Elliott	Feature film
1990	The Big Steal	Desmond Clark	Feature film
1988	The Grasscutter	Det. Inspector Cross	TV movie
1988	The Navigator	Searle	Feature film
1988	Georgia	Frank Le Mat	Feature film
1988	The Clean Machine	Keith Reid	Feature film
1985	Came a Hot Friday	Sel Bishop	Feature film
1984	Pallet on the Floor	Joe Voot	Feature film
1983	Wild Horses	Andy	Feature film
1982	Carry Me Back	Airforce Guard	
1982	Battletruck	Poole	Feature film
1981	Inside Every Thin Girl		TV movie
1981	Bad Blood	Trev Bond	Feature film
1980	Beyond Reasonable Doubt	Wyllie	Feature film
1980	Goodbye Pork Pie	Police Driver	Feature film

=== Television ===
Year	Title	Role	Notes
2021	Doctor Doctor	Bill	TV series, 1 episode
2020	Grey Nomads	Don Boyce	TV series, 6 episodes
2016	Janet King	Magistrate Schaeffer	TV series, 1 episode
2014–15	Love Child	Greg Matheson	TV series, season 2, 8 episodes
2014	The Moodys	Howard Benson	TV series, 3 episodes
2014	Auckland Daze	Arnold	TV series, 1 episode
2012	Rake	Prosecution	TV series, 1 episode
2009	Chandon Pictures	Basil	TV series, 1 episode
2006–10	City Homicide	Detective Senior Sergeant Wilton Sparkes	TV series, seasons 1-2 & 4, 11 episodes
2001–06	McLeod's Daughters	Harry Ryan	TV series, 87 episodes
2001	Stingers	Eddie Thomas	TV series, 1 episode
2001	Head Start	John Allott	TV series, 4 episodes
2001	Farscape	General Grynes	TV series, 1 episode
2001	The Farm	Peter Collins	TV series, 3 episodes
2000	The Lost World	Drakul	TV series, 1 episode
1999–01	All Saints	Ian Hanrahan / Mick Mason	TV series, 3 episodes
1999–96	Water Rats	Joe da Silva	TV series, 5 episodes
1997–99	Blue Heelers	John Scanlan / Jim Jamieson	TV series, 2 episodes
1996	Twisted Tales	Ray	TV series, 1 episode
1996	The Beast	Commander Wallingford	TV miniseries, 2 episodes
1995	Blue Murder	Tony Eustace	TV miniseries, 2 episodes
1995	Snowy River: The Mcgregor Saga	Charlie Dunn	TV series, 1 episode
1995	Halifax f.p.	Dale	TV series, 1 episode
1994–93	Secrets	Gary O'Leary	TV series, 13 episodes
1993	Stark	Private Detective	TV series, 2 episodes
1993	Seven Deadly Sins	Tom	TV miniseries, 1 episode: "Greed"
1993	Time Trax	Oscar	TV series, 1 episode
1992	South Pacific Adventures	Captain Johnson	
1989–92	Police Rescue	Fred 'Frog' Catteau	TV series, 19 episodes
1991–92	G.P.	Stan Brodie	TV series, 2 episodes
1992	The Girl from Tomorrow	Draco	TV series, 12 episodes
1989	Rafferty's Rules	Alex Reed	TV series, 1 episode
1989	Mission Impossible	Talbot	TV series, 1 episode
1989	E Street	Bernie	TV series, 1 episode
1988	Always Afternoon	Bill Kennon	TV series, 4 episodes
1987	Starlight Hotel	Det. Wallace	Feature film
1986	Dangerous Orphans	Hobbes	Feature film
1986	Adventurer	Mason	TV series, 12 episodes
1986	Seekers	Wright	TV series, 1 episode
1986	Footrot Flats	Hunk Murphy	Animated feature film
1985	Roche	Snatch	TV series, 2 episodes
1985	Hanlon	Sweeny	
1985	Lie of the Land	Huddy	
1985	Heart of the High Country	Hary	TV series, 1 episode
1984	Inside Straight		TV series, 1 episode
1984	Mortimer's Patch	Lance Harris	TV series, 1 episode
1979	The Neville Purvis Family Show	Larry Lucas	TV series, 6 episodes
1977	The Governor	Richard Seddon	TV series, 1 episode

== Activism ==
In 2002, he and his daughter, Jessica Napier, won $64,000 in the Australian version of Who Wants to Be a Millionaire? for a South Australian animal rights group. Both are animal rights supporters and vegetarians.
