= Power Rangers Dino Thunder =

American TV series

- Genre: Action-adventure; Fantasy; Science fiction; Superhero; Tokusatsu
- Based on: Bakuryū Sentai Abaranger by Toei Company
- Developed by: The Walt Disney Company; Toei Company
- Showrunners: Ann Austen; Douglas Sloan
- Written by: Douglas Sloan; Ann Austen; Jackie Marchand; John Tellegen; Steve Slavkin; Mark Hoffmeier; Bruce Kalish
- Directed by: Charlie Haskell; Andrew Merrifield; Paul Grinder; Douglas Sloan; Britta Johnstone
- Starring: See below
- Theme music composer: Bruce Lynch
- Composer: Bruce Lynch
- Countries of origin: United States; Japan
- Original language: English
- No. of episodes: 38

Production
- Executive producers: Ann Austen; Douglas Sloan
- Producers: Janine Dickins; Koichi Sakamoto
- Production locations: New Zealand (Wellington Region) (Wellington), (Auckland Region) (Auckland); Japan (Greater Tokyo Area) (Tokyo, Saitama, Yokohama) and (Kyoto)
- Cinematography: Simon Riera
- Running time: 20–21 minutes
- Production companies: BVS Entertainment; Renaissance Atlantic Entertainment; Toei Company, Ltd. Village Roadshow KP Productions Limited

Original release
- Network: ABC Family (Jetix)
- Release: February 14 – November 20, 2004

Related
- Power Rangers television series

Power Rangers Dino Thunder is a television series and the twelfth entry of the Power Rangers franchise. This incarnation of Power Rangers was based on Bakuryū Sentai Abaranger, the 27th entry of Toei Company's long-running Super Sentai franchise. Dino Thunder was also the subtitle of the Korean dub of Abaranger in South Korea and had a similar/identical logo to the American version as well. The series is notable as it features the return of Jason David Frank as Tommy Oliver as a main character and a dinosaur theme for the powers, abilities and assets from most of the series' protagonists and antagonists. It was the first series to be aired on ABC Family as well as part of Jetix on Toon Disney.

== Plot ==
Tommy Oliver, from Mighty Morphin Power Rangers to Power Rangers Turbo fame, returns as a paleontology professor in Reefside, California, following an incident several years prior on an island where he is pursued by Mesogog, an evil dinosauric who wishes to eradicate all human life and return Earth to the age of the dinosaurs, along with his henchmen Elsa, Zeltrax, and an army of Tyrannodrones and Triptoids, as well as their mutation monsters. When Tommy is assigned three detention students by Principal Randall (the human disguise of Elsa); athlete Conner McKnight, computer expert Ethan James and singer Kira Ford, they end up finding three Dino Gems – one for each teen, paving the way for their destiny as the Dino Thunder Power Rangers. Conner gains the powers of both the Tyrannozord and super running speed, Ethan gains the powers of both the Tricerazord and energy-formed skin-shield defense and Kira gains the powers of both the Pterazord and sonic screams.

Five episodes into the series, Tommy once again becomes a Ranger by bonding with the Black Dino Gem and receives its power of invisibility as the Black Dino Ranger. They are also later joined by Anton Mercer's adopted son Trent, who must deal with the inner struggle of good and evil (as Tommy himself once had to do as the evil Green Ranger) when he discovers a White Dino Gem in Mesogog's lab that morphs him into an Evil White Ranger, as the powers were originally intended to be Mesogog's. Mesogog is later revealed to be Anton Mercer, who – in a faulty lab experiment – began to mutate into Mesogog. Trent later sides with good as the White Dino Ranger, whose gem grants him the power of camouflage, and saves his father from the mutation.

Near the end of the series, Anton Mercer mutates in front of the Rangers, causing them to distrust Trent for not telling them about Anton's mutation in the first place. When Mesogog tricks Trent into handing over the Dino Gems in exchange for his father's freedom, the Rangers sacrifice their zords and use their raw Dino Gem Powers combined into a single last-resort attack to destroy Mesogog, which burns out the gems in the process.

== Cast and characters ==
Dino Thunder Rangers

- James Napier as Conner McKnight, the Red Dino Ranger and Triassic Ranger
- Kevin Duhaney as Ethan James, the Blue Dino Ranger
- Emma Lahana as Kira Ford, the Yellow Dino Ranger
- Jason David Frank as Dr. Tommy Oliver, the Black Dino Ranger
- Jeffrey Parazzo as Trent Fernandez-Mercer, the White Dino Ranger

Supporting characters

- Ismay Johnston as Hayley Ziktor
- Katrina Devine as Cassidy Cornell
- Tom Hern as Devin Del Valle
- Latham Gaines as Dr. Anton Mercer

Villains

- Latham Gaines as Mesogog
- Miriama Smith as Elsa/Principal Randall
- James Gaylyn as the voice of Zeltrax
- Adam Gardiner as the voice of Evil White Dino Ranger Clone

Guest stars

- Pua Magasiva as Shane Clarke, the Red Wind Ranger
- Sally Martin as Tori Hanson, the Blue Wind Ranger
- Glenn McMillan as Waldo "Dustin" Brooks, the Yellow Wind Ranger
- Adam Tuominen as Hunter Bradley, the Crimson Thunder Ranger
- Jorgito Vargas Jr. as Blake Bradley, the Navy Thunder Ranger
- Jason Chan as Cameron "Cam" Watanabe, the Green Samurai Ranger
- Grant McFarland as Sensei Kanoi Watanabe and Lothor
- Peter Rowley as the voice of Zurgane
- Katrina Browne as Kapri
- Katrina Devine as Marah

== Episodes ==
No.	Title	Directed by	Written by	Original release date
1	"Day of the Dino"	Charlie Haskell	Douglas Sloan	February 14, 2004
2	"Day of the Dino"	Charlie Haskell	Ann Austen	February 14, 2004
Former Veteran Ranger Tommy Oliver takes a teaching job in Reefside years after escaping the evil and mysterious dinosauroid monster named Mesogog. He is assigned by Principal Randall to look after three detention students: Conner McKnight, Ethan James, and Kira Ford. The trio stumbles upon a secret hideaway during a trip to the museum and finds the Dino Gems. They are chased by a group of Tyrannodrones and are forced to fight, when the trio discover strange powers have been granted to them. Wanting to forget the whole thing, Kira rejects her Gem only to be abducted by Mesogog's forces. Kira then escapes from Mesogog's lair, and the teens and Tommy are confronted by Zeltrax. Later, Mesogog reveals his powerful Bio Zords and unleashes them on the city. Tommy grants the students the means to become Power Rangers and sends them to tame the wild creatures. They succeed and combine their Zords into the Thundersaurus Megazord to halt Zeltrax's attack.
3	"Wave Goodbye"	Charlie Haskell	Douglas Sloan	February 21, 2004
Conner resigns as the Red Ranger when his Ranger duties interfere with his dreams of being a soccer star and cause him to miss a vital try-out. However, he reconsiders after saving a little girl while defeating Mesogog's Birdbrain mutation with help from Ethan and Kira and the Raptor Riders given to the Rangers by Tommy. In the end, Mesogog kidnaps Tommy to force him to unleash the power from within a stone.
4	"Legacy of Power"	Andrew Merrifield	Ann Austen	February 28, 2004
Continuing from the last episode, Mesogog has kidnapped Tommy to find out how to access a mysterious power source. As Hayley searches for a way to rescue Tommy, the Rangers watch a video diary on the Power Rangers' history with footage from the past eleven seasons. This is the 500th episode of Power Rangers.
5	"Back in Black"	Andrew Merrifield	Ann Austen	March 6, 2004
Continuing from the last episode, the Rangers rescue Tommy who steals the stone and discovers the power within is the Black Dino Gem. Harnessing its powers, Tommy reignites his past to become the Dino Thunder Black Ranger, awakening the Brachio Zord in the process. To defeat Mesogog's latest creation Pollinator, the Rangers are sent the Cephala Zord, which combines with the Thundersaurus Megazord to defeat Pollinator.
6	"Diva in Distress"	Andrew Merrifield	Jackie Marchand	March 13, 2004
Kira is reunited with her old celebrity friend, Kylee Styles, who subsequently falls victim to the youth-draining Donkeyvac monster, and Kira comforts Kylee by reminding her of better times while the others confront this new menace. When Kira helps her friends take down Donkeyvac, everyone's youth is restored, and Kylee and Kira reunite and perform a duet at Hayley's Cyberspace. Guest Starring: Morgan Reese Fairhead as Kylee Styles
7	"Game On"	Andrew Merrifield	John Tellegen	March 20, 2004
Mesogog's latest plan takes advantage of Ethan's obsession for a video game by transporting him into the game's virtual world where he meets a strange wizard and the even stranger Triptoids. Kira also gets sucked into the game, but they manage to return to the real world and discover that the Triptoids and the wizard have followed them. After the Rangers deal with the Demagnetron monster, Hayley sends the wizard back to the virtual world.
8	"Golden Boy"	Paul Grinder	Ann Austen	March 27, 2004
In his effort to enhance himself, Zeltrax accidentally creates his own "son" who calls himself Golden Rod. While Tommy's former partner Anton Mercer, adoptive father to Trent Fernandez, purchases the Cyberspace Cafe, the Rangers head to City Hall to stop him only to run into Zeltrax and Golden Rod. As the Thundersaurus Megazord struggles against the enlarged Golden Rod's might, Tommy steps in and destroys the son of Zeltrax with his Brachio Staff. Afterward, the city councilwoman prevents Mercer from taking over the cafe.
9	"Beneath the Surface"	Paul Grinder	Jackie Marchand	April 3, 2004
Dr. Oliver and Principal Randall take the students on a dig, using that pretense to hide their real motive of finding a Dino Egg. Pulling a bait and switch on the Rangers, Randall—who is Mesogog's henchwoman Elsa in disguise—manages to steal the real Dino Egg and hatches the Dimetro Zord. After a brief battle, the Rangers tame the Dimetro Zord, whose saw blade ability helps to defeat Mesogog's latest monster, Scorpex.
10	"Ocean Alert"	Paul Grinder	John Tellegen	April 10, 2004
When famous actress Nikki Valentina is captured by Mesogog to be used as a part of his evil schemes, the Rangers must save her and face off against Megaldor. Meanwhile, Hayley uncovers a new Dino Egg which hatches into the Stego Zord. Guest Starring: Chantal Gaiqui as Nikki Valentine.
11	"White Thunder"	Charlie Haskell	Douglas Sloan	April 17, 2004
12	"White Thunder"	Charlie Haskell	Douglas Sloan & Jackie Marchand	April 24, 2004
13	"White Thunder"	Charlie Haskell	Douglas Sloan & Jackie Marchand	May 1, 2004
When the powerful White Dino Gem goes missing from Mesogog's fortress, a monster is sent to lure out whoever stole it. Mesogog's plan works, and the renegade White Ranger appears, easily defeating the beast and forcing the Rangers to retreat. Conner and Kira are sent to locate a new Dino Egg, only to find it in the White Ranger's possession. Hayley alerts the team to the Angor monster's presence, and the Megazord duels it while Tommy goes to confront the White Ranger and retrieve the Dino Egg. While the Rangers defeat the monster with help from the newly-hatched Parasaur Zord, which gives the Thundersaurus Megazord a scissor blade ability, Tommy fails, and the Drago Zord is hatched. The White Ranger steals the Rangers' Stego Zord and combines it with his Drago Zord to form the Dino Stegozord, which blasts the Thundersarus Megazord apart. While a trio of auxiliary Zords are sent into battle, Conner dukes it out with the White Ranger and unlocks his Super Dino Mode. Later, Tommy discovers the White Ranger's true identity as Trent but is encased in amber before he could tell the others.
14	"Truth and Consequences"	Andrew Merrifield	Jackie Marchand	May 8, 2004
As the Rangers attempt to free Tommy from his amber prison, Trent starts causing trouble. In a battle against the Rangers, Trent stops himself from hurting a demorphed Kira and later tells her that he is the White Ranger. While Kira is initially shocked, she offers to help him, but he declines and decides to leave the city, citing that he is too dangerous to stay around. The Ankylo Zord reveals itself and strongly beats the Dino Stegazord with the ability of a second drill.
15	"Leader of the Whack"	Andrew Merrifield	John Tellegen	May 15, 2004
As Trent leaves, he notices a meteor crashing into the woods. The Rangers show up to investigate, hoping that the meteor will help free Tommy, and are greeted by Tyrannodrones and Rojobot. During the ensuing battle, the meteor blasts everyone with a strange energy that alters their personalities. Conner becomes a brainiac, Ethan becomes a jock, Kira turns into a shopaholic valley girl, Cassidy becomes a nerd, and Devin becomes the coolest kid in school. The Rangers face off against the now-aggressive monster and defeat him with Trent's help, who has been turned good by the meteor's rays. The Rangers destroy the meteor, revert to normal and use a fragment to set Tommy free. While Tommy is glad to be free, he now finds himself permanently morphed.
16	"Burning at Both Ends"	Andrew Merrifield	Ann Austen	May 22, 2004
Trent, now completely overwhelmed by the evil influence of his Dino Gem, joins Mesogog. After tricking the Rangers into believing he has reformed, he presents them with brand new Dino ATV's as a gift of goodwill, but Tommy discovers his ruse. Meanwhile, Mesogog is revealed to be Anton Mercer's unwilling alter-ego as Anton fails to purge Mesogog from his body.
17	"The Missing Bone"	Paul Grinder	Douglas Sloan	May 22, 2004
A failed, fossilized experiment of Tommy and Anton's named Fossilador is revived and brainwashes Kira into retrieving its missing piece. Once it is complete, Fossilador wreaks havoc on Reefside and battles an incomplete Thundersarus Megazord. Once free from Fossilador's control, Kira saves the day with the help of the Pterazord.
18	"Bully for Ethan"	Paul Grinder	Ann Austen	June 12, 2004
Ethan is bullied by one of his classmates while Trent and Zeltrax forge an uneasy alliance to destroy their enemies. Meanwhile, Tommy tries to reason with Zeltrax after discovering his true identity as his old friend, Smitty, who was lost in an accident when working for a rival company and was reconstructed into a cyborg by Mesogog. Trent is singled out by Mesogog, who warns him not to betray him.
19	"Lost & Found in Translation"	Paul Grinder	Steve Slavkin	June 13, 2004
When Conner, Ethan, and Kira find a show about Power Rangers in Japan, Conner is appalled at its portrayal of them. Meanwhile, the Japanese Rangers must go up against a money-hungry monster named Ka-Ching and have an encounter with a baseball player named Whacker Wilson. Note: This was an English dubbed version of the 10th episode of its Sentai counterpart Bakuryū Sentai Abaranger; the episode in the original series was Abare Leaguer Bind.
20	"It's a Mad Mad Mackerel"	Paul Grinder	Mark Hoffmeier	June 19, 2004
Kira gets an internship on the Funky Fisherman Show, only to realize how unhappy she is with her job due to the actor portraying the Funky Fisherman being too demanding. Meanwhile, Elsa kidnaps the fisherman's sidekick, Marty the Mackerel, and transforms him into Mad Mackerel to battle the Rangers.
21	"Copy That"	Douglas Sloan	Jackie Marchand	July 10, 2004
Mesogog attempts to destroy Trent when Zeltrax, through Copyotter, frames the White Ranger for destroying his lab. However, Anton Mercer breaks through and destroy the White Dino Gem's hold over Trent, who returns the favor by promising to Anton he will use his powers for good. Later, Zeltrax reveals an evil, soulless clone of the White Ranger that he made from Copyotter's salvaged cloning technology.
22	"Triassic Triumph"	Douglas Sloan	Ann Austen	July 17, 2004
Zeltrax manifests the White Terrorsaurus from the evil White Ranger clone, while Tommy and Trent search for a powerful new energy source. Conner is discouraged when his plan to defeat the White Terrorsaurus costs the Rangers their Zords, when he senses a new power calling out to him. Conner steps up to accept the Shield of Triumph and, with it, the ability to become the Triassic Ranger. With a whole new level of power at his command, Conner quickly destroys the Terrorsaurus.
23	"A Star Is Torn"	Douglas Sloan	Douglas Sloan	July 24, 2004
Kira scores a deal with a famous record producer, but is not satisfied with her new image. Meanwhile, Hayley tries to get a new vehicle up and running, while Tommy and Zeltrax duel in a fierce battle aboard his Aerial Assault Vehicle.
24	"A Ranger Exclusive"	Andrew Merrifield	Douglas Sloan	July 31, 2004
Kira tries to get Cassidy a job as a reporter for the local TV station, which falls victim to Mesogog's newest creation. As the monster Jupitor infiltrates the satellites to destroy Jupiter and thus causes such an incredible impact to leave the Earth devoid of human life, the Rangers must prevent Mesogog from accomplishing his goal of reverting the Earth to the age of the dinosaurs.
25	"Tutenhawken's Curse"	Andrew Merrifield	Jackie Marchand	August 7, 2004
Ethan is hit with a string of bad luck after uncovering an ancient curse and awakening Pharaoh Tutenhawken. The Rangers battle Tutenhawken in their search to break the curse, and the Pharaoh takes Cassidy as his queen. Ethan comes to the rescue with his new Hovercraft Cycle with the Rangers at a tactical disadvantage.
26	"Disappearing Act"	Andrew Merrifield	Ann Austen	August 21, 2004
Elsa retrieves some strange slime that matures her new creation Thornox and Tommy gathers a sample for himself. After Hayley analyzes the substance, she prepares to use it on Tommy in the hopes of demorphing him. The process is a success, but now, the veteran Ranger is invisible.
27	"Fighting Spirit"	Paul Grinder	Jackie Marchand	August 28, 2004
Tommy informs the Rangers of an experiment that he hopes will restore him to normal. A hesitant Hayley activates a machine that draws power from his Dino Gem and makes Tommy visible again. Unfortunately, the experiment shatters his Dino Gem, rendering Tommy comatose, despite now completely visible. Meanwhile, as the Rangers are stripped of their powers by a new White Terrorsaurus, the hospitalized Tommy finds himself in a strange dream-world where he must fight three of his past Ranger alter-egos in a battle for his life.
28	"The Passion of Conner"	Paul Grinder	Ann Austen	September 5, 2004
A young environmentalist named Krista is protesting to save an old tree. In his efforts to impress Krista and win her heart, Conner finds himself wishing for the same passion she has. When Zeltrax returns and powers up using the serum inside the tree, he transforms the tree into a monster named Deadwood, whom the Rangers kill with the new formation of the Triceramax Megazord. When Zeltrax endangers Krista, Conner's determination to save her grants him access to the Triassic Battlizer, originating from Conner's Triassic power. Guest Star: Antonia Prebble as Krista
29	"Isn't It Lava-ly"	Paul Grinder	Bruce Kalish	September 18, 2004
While Tommy is busy, volcanologist/substitute teacher Dr. Morton is captured by Elsa and turned into the Horn-Rimmed Monster as a part of her latest scheme to activate a long-dormant volcano. Meanwhile, an overconfident Ethan takes part in a video game competition and is shocked to discover his opponent is Devin.
30	"Strange Relations"	Charlie Haskell	Jackie Marchand	September 25, 2004
As Mesogog and Anton Mercer battle for control, a fluctuation in the Morphin Grid forces the White Ranger and his evil clone to meet in a final battle. Meanwhile, the other Rangers battle Mesogog's Jade Gladiator who manages to create Skortch and revive Deadwood.
31	"Thunder Storm"	Charlie Haskell	Douglas Sloan	October 2, 2004
32	"Thunder Storm"	Charlie Haskell	Douglas Sloan	October 9, 2004
Lothor manages to climb out of the Abyss Of Evil and, with corrupt morphers, brainwashes the Ninja Storm trio into servitude. After the Wind Rangers lay waste to their Ninja Academy, Cam alerts Hunter and Blake while the Dino Rangers face off against the Wind Rangers in an ultimate Ranger showdown. As Cam, Hunter, and Blake venture into the Abyss of Evil to retrieve their lost powers, the evil Wind Rangers challenge the Dino Rangers to a rematch. Just as both teams are about to morph, Cam, Hunter, and Blake appear and snap the Wind Rangers out of their trance by using clean Power Discs. Meanwhile, Lothor and Mesogog unite to take over the Earth, only to turn against each other once all eleven Rangers, including Marah and Kapri, foil their plan. Guest Starring: Pua Magasiva, Sally Martin, Glenn McMillan, Adam Tuominen, Jorgito Vargas, Jr., Jason Chan, Grant McFarland, and Katrina Browne.
33	"In Your Dreams"	Britta Johnstone	Jackie Marchand	October 16, 2004
With the Geno Randomizer hooked up to her dream machine, Elsa invades the Ranger's dreams to destroy them for good. Tommy's dream of the calamari he had for causes him to fight Squidrose, Kira's dream about a reptile report due has her fighting Croco D'Vile, Ethan's dream about looking at a picture of a monkey has him fighting Rhumba Monkey, and Connor's dream about doing early Christmas shopping with his mother has him fighting Rude Elf. With each Ranger facing off against a unique monster, will they be able to overcome their fears?
34	"Drawn into Danger"	Britta Johnstone	Jackie Marchand	October 23, 2004
Trent attends a comic convention to show his work to famous artist Carson Brady. Elsa is also there and gives Carson a pen that possesses him, making him draw a comic that traps the Rangers, and pits them against the villainous Fridiga. When Trent reads the comic and finds out the Rangers do not survive the fight, he is forced to reveal his identity as the White Ranger to Carson in order to save his team.
35	"House of Cards"	Britta Johnstone	Douglas Sloan	October 30, 2004
Trent arouses the suspicion of his teammates as he tries to keep his promise to his father Anton and keep his identity as Mesogog secret. The Rangers find out that Elsa has been using the form of Principal Randall when Tommy goes to get back a Ruby Dragon card she confiscated from Ethan. Elsa escapes while advising the Rangers to tell the board of education that Principal Randall has resigned. When Elsa uses the Ruby Dragon card as the basis for a powerful new monster based on the Ruby Dragon, Trent's secret is on the verge of being exposed. Although the Rangers defeat the Ruby Dragon and regain the card, their real troubles are just beginning as they discover that Anton Mercer is Mesogog when Anton could no longer control the transformation and changes in front of the Rangers, who immediately begin to distrust Trent.
36	"A Test of Trust"	Britta Johnstone	Ann Austen	November 6, 2004
Mesogog uses a potion that Elsa created to separate himself from Anton Mercer. To make things worse, he sends an Ugly Monster that easily beats the Triassic Ranger and creates an evil clone of the Megazord, the Replicant Zord! Meanwhile, Conner, Ethan, and Kira recall how much they have changed since becoming Rangers, while Trent faces losing his powers unless he finds a way to redeem himself. Will Trent succeed, or is this the end for the White Ranger?
37	"Thunder Struck"	Andrew Merrifield	Douglas Sloan	November 13, 2004
38	"Thunder Struck"	Andrew Merrifield	Ann Austen	November 20, 2004
Mesogog tortures Anton Mercer and shows Elsa his latest plan, showing off a giant cannon that could transform the Earth into a new Dinosaur age. To do this, he needs the powers within the Dino Gems...but he will also drains Elsa's powers, turning her back into a human no longer under his control. She is rescued by the Rangers and taken to the Dino Lab. Trent pretends to make a deal with Mesogog, allowing the Rangers to invade and destroy Mesogog's cannon. Trent returns with Anton Mercer intact. Zeltrax comes to the Dino Lab, destroying it and takes Elsa away, holding her hostage inside his new Zelzord. As Zeltrax destroys the city with the Triptoids, the Rangers fight back. Tommy and later Kira go into the Zelzord, where they destroy Zeltrax. The Rangers use all the Dino Zords to blast the Zelzord, but the Zelzord survives, forcing the Rangers to sacrifice their Zords to destroy it. The Rangers meet on the ground, where they find Mesogog, who survived the attack on his lab and transforms into a Mesomonster using Dino Gem energy, and fights them until the Triassic Ranger knocks him down. However, he clones himself, so the Rangers use their Dino Gems to create an unstoppable power that destroys the Mesomonsters, sacrificing their powers in process. Cassidy and Devin discover the Rangers' identities, but do not wish to expose it because the Rangers are their friends. The powerless Rangers celebrate their victory at the prom, where Conner says he will open a Soccer camp, and Ethan will take part in a video game competition, and he is practicing now, promising he will not lose again. Trent plans to go to art school, and Anton Mercer is proud of his son. The series ends with Kira singing a song with memories about their life.

== Production ==
Conversations of the season's name started as early as a year before the show's premiere. On March 4, 2003, an annual kick-off presentation was given to Disney and Bandai representatives to discuss the next year of business with topics such as forecasts of toy sales and development timelines. While "Dino Thunder" was not being presented at this time, the following titles were given as recommendations:

- Dino Strike
- Dino Might
- Dino Damage
- Dino Defenders
- Dragon Hunt

This series sees legacy cast member Jason David Frank (Mighty Morphin Power Rangers, Power Rangers Zeo, Power Rangers Turbo) return as a series regular, now in the role as mentor and later additional Ranger. At a Ikkicon Q&A in 2010, Frank discussed how his return started with a call he received from co-executive producers Ann Austen and Douglas Sloan, the former being Frank's first acting coach, in an effort to boost the show's ratings.

With his family and life in the United States, it is rumored that Frank negotiated time off during the season's shooting in New Zealand to be able to return home. Relying on stunt performers and additional ADR, writers created a plot that has Tommy collectively encased in amber, unable to de-morph, and unable to control his invisible powers for episodes 13–26.

The season's fourth episode, "Legacy of Power," features a retelling of the show's in-universe history for the show's 500th episode celebration. "Fighting Spirit," the season's 27th episode, sees Tommy encounter his previous Ranger forms in a dream and aired on the eleventh anniversary of Power Rangers.

Dino Thunder was the first Power Rangers season to overtly acknowledge its Super Sentai roots with an episode entitled "Lost and Found in Translation," which featured a Japanese show based on the Power Rangers dubbed in English. In actuality, the footage used in that episode was from episode 10 ("Abare League Bind") of Dino Thunder's source series, Bakuryū Sentai Abaranger, dubbed in a manner similar to the comedic parody dub of Kagaku Sentai Dynaman in the late 1980s.

== Video games ==
Video game publisher THQ released two video games for Dino Thunder, one version for both Sony's PlayStation 2 and Nintendo's GameCube while the other was exclusively released on Nintendo's Game Boy Advance. Developed by Natsume, the GBA version was a side-scrolling fighting game with 13 missions and allowed players to control both the rangers and Megazord at different parts of the levels. The home console version, developed by Pacific Coast Power & Light, let players pilot the team's Zords as they work to free their auxiliary machines and destroy enemy facilities. This version included unlockable Zords from the two previous seasons, Wild Force and Ninja Storm, and was the first Power Rangers game to be produced on a sixth generation console.

== Home media ==
In the United States, the series was released by Buena Vista Home Entertainment on five volumes, consisting of the first 24 episodes, except for Episode 10:

- Day of the Dino (June 1, 2004, episodes 1–3, also includes episodes 37–38 of Ninja Storm)
- Legacy of Power (September 7, 2004, episodes 4–8)
- White Thunder (September 7, 2004, episodes 9, 11–14)
- Collision Course (December 7, 2004, episodes 15–19)
- Triassic Triumph (December 7, 2004, episodes 20–24)

These volume sets were also released in regions where BVHE held distribution rights, however, Volume 1 does not include the bonus Ninja Storm episodes. In countries where licensing was held by Jetix Europe, releases depended on the region or distributor.

BVHE released the complete series in the United Kingdom on July 14, 2008, on a seven-disc boxset. In the United States, Shout! Factory released the complete series on a five-disc set on October 18, 2016.
