= Ikkicon =

Anime convention in the United States

Coordinates: 30°31′9″N 97°37′59″W

IKKiCON
- Status: Active
- Genre: Anime, Manga, Japanese pop culture
- Venue: Kalahari Resorts and Conventions
- Location: Round Rock, Texas
- Country: United States
- Inaugurated: 2007
- Attendance: 5,971 in 2010/11
- Organizer: Ikkicon LLC
- Website: http://www.ikkicon.com/

IKKiCON is an annual three-day anime convention held during January at the Kalahari Resorts and Conventions in Round Rock, Texas.

== Programming ==
The convention typically offers live entertainment, musical performances, panels, screening rooms, vendors, video games, and workshops.

== History ==
IKKiCON was created in 2007, originally taking the date of Ushicon, and had higher attendance than expected. In 2009, voice actor Greg Ayres suffered a mild heart attack while attending the convention, and later thanked the staff for its response to the emergency. In 2015, the World Cosplay Summit held regional qualifiers at IKKiCON. The IKKiCON planned for January 2021 was cancelled due to the COVID-19 pandemic, with the convention holding an event in May 2021 instead. The convention for 2021 moved to the Austin Marriott Downtown.

IKKiCON in 2023 moved to the Kalahari Resorts and Conventions in Round Rock, Texas.

=== Detailed event history ===
| Dates | Location | Atten. | Guests |
|---|---|---|---|
| February 2–4, 2007 | Woodward Hotel & Conference Center; Austin, Texas | 2,500 (estimated) | Christopher Ayres, Greg Ayres, Amelie Belcher, Steve Bennett, Sandy Fox, Lisa Furukawa, Rivkah Greulich, Hilary Haag, Kyle Hebert, Samantha Inoue-Harte, Limit Break Cosplay, Matthew Mercer, Vic Mignogna, Robert Navarro, Chris Patton, Wendy Powell, Erica Reis, Xero Reynolds, Mark Rizkallah, Carrie Savage, Doug Smith, Space Invader, Michael "Mookie" Terracciano, and Stephanie Yanez. |
| February 8–10, 2008 | Doubletree Hotel; Austin, Texas | 3,500 (estimated) | Tina Anderson, Christopher Ayres, Greg Ayres, Amelie Belcher, Steve Bennett, Leah Clark, Aaron Dismuke, JoEllen Elam, Lisa Furukawa, Tiffany Grant, Matt Greenfield, Jessie James Grelle, Chris Hazelton, Kyle Hebert, Matt Herms, Chuck Huber, Samantha Inoue-Harte, Limit Break Cosplay, Vic Mignogna, Jace Moore, The OneUps, Brina Palencia, Chris Patton, Wendy Powell, Xero Reynolds, Rusika, Carrie Savage, Doug Smith, Space Invader, Michael "Mookie" Terracciano, Amanda Tomasch, Vaeidos, Kira Vincent-Davis, and Larissa Wolcott. |
| February 6–8, 2009 | Hilton Austin; Austin, Texas | 4,000 (estimated) | Hannah Alcorn, Christopher Ayres, Greg Ayres, Amelie Belcher, Chris Bevins, Jessica Boone, Leah Clark, Jason David Frank, Caitlin Glass, Jessie James Grelle, Todd Haberkorn, Clarine Harp, Kyle Hebert, Matt Herms, Samantha Inoue-Harte, Last Stop Tokyo, Jamie Marchi, Carli Mosier, Trina Nishimura, Chris Patton, Peelander-Z, Meredith Placko, Wendy Powell, Steve Prince, Kristine Sa, Tony Salvaggio, Carrie Savage, Jan Scott-Frazier, The Slants, Michael "Mookie" Terracciano, Brett Weaver, and J. Shannon Weaver. |
| January 1–3, 2010 | Hilton Austin; Austin, Texas | 4,200 (estimated) | Christopher Ayres, Greg Ayres, Johnny Yong Bosch, The Browncoats, Eyeshine, Jason David Frank, Caitlin Glass, Yaya Han, Matt Herms, Vic Mignogna, Outland Armour, Meredith Placko, and Schwarze Sonne. |
| December 31, 2010 – January 2, 2011 | Hilton Austin; Austin, Texas | 5,971 | Airship Isabella, Christine Auten, Christopher Ayres, Greg Ayres, Amelie Belcher, Johnny Yong Bosch, The Browncoats, Descendants of Erdrick, Eyeshine, Yaya Han, Matt Herms, Brittney Karbowski, DJ Midget, Carli Mosier, One-Eyed Doll, and Michael Sinterniklaas. |
| December 30, 2011 – January 1, 2012 | AT&T Executive Education and Conference Center; Austin, Texas | | Christine Auten, Christopher Ayres, Greg Ayres, Tia Ballard, Amelie Belcher, Johnny Yong Bosch, Richard Epcar, Eyeshine, Caitlin Glass, Yaya Han, Jerry Jewell, Brittney Karbowski, Riki "Riddle" LeCotey, Carli Mosier, NeRiMa, Riddle, Chii Sakurabi, Michael Sinterniklaas, and Ellyn Stern. |
| December 28-30, 2012 | Hilton Austin; Austin, Texas | | Christopher Ayres, Greg Ayres, Amelie Belcher, Junko Fujiyama, Brittney Karbowski, Julia Litchy, Bryan Massey, Kyle "Turtle Smithy" Mathis, Malinda "Malindachan" Mathis, Lisa Ortiz, Psyche Corporation, Justin Rojas, Michelle Rojas, Brad Swaile, Tom Wayland, and Greg Wicker. |
| December 27-29, 2013 | Hilton Austin; Austin, Texas | | Christopher Ayres, Greg Ayres, Tia Ballard, Clifford Chapin, Jillian Coglan, Samurai Dan Coglan, Junko Fujiyama, Caitlin Glass, Jarrod Greene, Ben Hamby, Andrew Hilton, Lauren Landa, Kyle "Turtle Smithy" Mathis, Malinda "Malindachan" Mathis, DJ Midget, Carli Mosier, Nylon Pink, The Sky D.o.G.s, and Krystal Stoner. |
| January 2-4, 2015 | Hilton Austin; Austin, Texas | | Christopher Ayres, Greg Ayres, Bill Doran, Ben Hamby, Aya Ikeda, Carrie Keranen, Lisa Ortiz, Monica Rial, Chii Sakurabi, and Tom Wayland. |
| January 1-3, 2016 | Renaissance Austin Hotel; Austin, Texas | | AlpacaAsh, Christopher Ayres, Greg Ayres, Jo Envel, Yummy Gamorah, Joshua Hart, Kyle Hebert, Akinori Isobe, Masumi Kano, and Carli Mosier. |
| December 30, 2016 - January 1, 2017 | Renaissance Austin Hotel; Austin, Texas | | Christopher Ayres, Greg Ayres, Tia Ballard, Andrew Love, Carli Mosier, Erica Schroeder, Saki Tachibana, Meg Turney, Twin Cosplay, Twinzik, and Gareth West. |
| December 29-31, 2017 | Renaissance Austin Hotel; Austin, Texas | | Luci Christian, Kevin Duhaney, Goldy, Darrel Guilbeau, Lauren Landa, Kyle "Turtle Smithy" Mathis, Malinda "Malindachan" Mathis, Bryce Papenbrook, Jeff Parazzo, SEC-C Cosplay, Blake Shepard, Teca, and Vitamin H Productions. |
| December 28-30, 2018 | Renaissance Austin Hotel; Austin, Texas | | Greg Ayres, Tia Ballard, Beau Billingslea, Sephi Hakubi, Mel Hoppe, Carl Martin, Sarah Natochenny, Lisa Ortiz, Vitamin H Productions, and Steff Von Schweetz. |
| December 27-29, 2019 | Renaissance Austin Hotel; Austin, Texas | | Greg Ayres, Jim Foronda, Marissa Lenti, April Martin, Jason Paige, Wendy Powell, Reika, Cristina Vee, Vitamin H Productions, and Barry Yandell. |
| May 28-30, 2021 | Austin Marriott Downtown; Austin, Texas | | Greg Ayres, Dani Chambers, Cynthia Cranz, Bryce Papenbrook, and Oh My Sophii. |
| December 31, 2021 - January 2, 2022 | Austin Marriott Downtown; Austin, Texas | | Greg Ayres, Brittney Karbowski, Adam McArthur, Landon McDonald, Matthew David Rudd, and Anne Yatco. |
| January 20-22, 2023 | Kalahari Resorts and Conventions; Round Rock, Texas | | Greg Ayres, Anthony Bowling, Dani Chambers, Cris George, Megan Shipman, Natalie Van Sistine, and Barry Yandell. |
| January 19-21, 2024 | Kalahari Resorts and Conventions; Round Rock, Texas | | Bryn Apprill, Greg Ayres, Brian Holder, Marcus M. Mauldin, Chris Patton, Oscar Seung, and John Swasey. |
| January 10-12, 2025 | Kalahari Resorts and Conventions; Round Rock, Texas | | Greg Ayres, Bill Butts, Dani Chambers, Kaida Cosplay, Lauren Landa, Emi Lo, Brian Mathis, Jason Charles Miller, Stephanie Nadolny, Corey Pettit, and Wendy Powell. |
| January 9-11, 2026 | Kalahari Resorts and Conventions; Round Rock, Texas | | Greg Ayres, Morgan Berry, Jordan Dash Cruz, Hilary Haag, Jill Harris, Brittney Karbowski, Lauren Landa, Jason Charles Miller, Madeleine Morris, Corey Pettit, Alex Rochon, and John Swasey. |
| January 8-10, 2027 | Kalahari Resorts and Conventions; Round Rock, Texas | | Brilliant Kingdom, ChibiTifa, Allegra Clark, Aaron Dismuke, Lizzie Freeman, Michael Kovach, Elsie Lovelock, Jamie Marchi, Skye Redden, Kirk Thornton, and Kari Wahlgren. |
