= Tom Hern =

New Zealand actor and film producer

- Born: Thomas Hern; 10 December 1984 (age 41); Christchurch, New Zealand
- Other name: Herndog
- Occupations: Film producer, Actor
- Years active: 1998 – present

Thomas Hern (born 10 December 1984) is a New Zealand actor and independent film producer. He is known for producing NZ feature films The Dark Horse, Everything We Loved, and Pork Pie (a reboot of Kiwi classic Goodbye Pork Pie). Hern also produced the action-comedy Guns Akimbo, starring Daniel Radcliffe and Samara Weaving and TIFF Midnight Madness award-winner Shadow in the Cloud.

As an actor Hern played Ram, the young paraplegic, polygamist villain in cult sci-fi series The Tribe and the comic-relief character Devin Del Valle in the 2004 television show Power Rangers Dino Thunder. Between 2006 and 2007, Hern also appeared in South Pacific Pictures-produced New Zealand television series Shortland Street as Baxter Cormack. Hern also appeared in Revelations, Interrogation, Maddigan's Quest, as well as in many supporting and presenting roles. His filmography includes various TV and radio commercials and voiceovers.

Thomas Hern was born in Christchurch, New Zealand, and has two older brothers and an older sister. He is also known by the nickname Herndog.

Hern continues to work on musical side-projects, Theodore High, with Latham Gaines (who starred alongside Hern in Power Rangers Dino Thunder as Anton Mercer/Mesogog) and rock band The Drop D's.

== Recent work ==
Hern is a co-founder and managing director of Four Knights Film Ltd along with James Napier.

As lead Producer of The Dark Horse, Hern won the Moa-award for "Best Film" at the 2014 New Zealand Film Awards (the film which won over 30 awards at Film Festivals around the world; including Audience Awards at the San Francisco International Film Festival, the Seattle International Film Festival and the Rotterdam International Film Festival). In 2015, Hern was recognised as a Future Leader of the industry by Screen International (in their "Cannes Edition") and sat on the International Jury for the Berlin Film Festival (Generation Section). In 2016, Hern won the pitching prize at the MIFF 37 Degrees South market in Melbourne.

Hern produced Guns Akimbo, alongside Felipe Marino and Joe Neurauter. The film had its World Premiere at the Toronto International Film Festival 2019.

Hern produced the short film, Lambs. Lambs premiered at the Berlin International Film Festival and screened in competition at the Clermont Ferrand, Sydney, Melbourne and New Zealand International film festivals (the film also won both major awards at the 2012 New Zealand International Film Festival – The People's Choice Award and The Grand Jury Prize for short films). Hern and Four Knights' released 2 feature films in 2014; The Dark Horse, starring Cliff Curtis and James Rolleston and directed by James Napier Robertson, and Everything We Loved, an arthouse drama by Max Currie (which had its World Premiere at the Palm Springs International Film Festival in January 2014).

In 2008/09, Hern produced (and co-starred in) his debut feature film, I'm Not Harry Jenson, with longtime friend James Napier who also starred in The Tribe and Power Rangers Dino Thunder. The film was released throughout New Zealand in 2010, by Rialto Entertainment, to strong reviews and was represented for international sales by Media Luna New Films in Germany. I'm Not Harry Jenson also played at the Shanghai International Film Festival.

Hern produced Shadow in the Cloud; a feature film starring Chloe Grace Moretz, and directed by fellow New Zealander, Roseanne Liang and is co-writing and producing a drama series about the Polynesian Panthers. Shadow in the Cloud won the Midnight Madness Audience Award at the Toronto International Film Festival in 2020.

Hern is set to make his directorial debut with the sports comedy film Shearing the Love. It will star Geoffrey Rush and Dom Hetrakul and will begin shooting in 2026.

== Filmography ==
=== As actor ===
Year	Title	Role	Notes
1999	What Now?! PM	On the Scene Reporter	TV series
2001–02	WNTV	On the Scene Reporter	TV series
2002–03	Revelations – The Initial Journey	Jess	Main role
2002–03	The Tribe	Ram	Main role
2004	Power Rangers Dino Thunder	Devin Del Valle	Main role
2005	Two Cons	Con 1	Short film
2005	Interrogation	Christian Tariq McAvoy	"Money Talks"
2005–2007	Shortland Street	Baxter Cormack	Regular role
2006	Maddigan's Quest	Bird Boy Leader	"Birdboys"
2009	I'm Not Harry Jenson	Kevin	Feature film
2009	Life's a Riot	Squeaker Dudley	TV film
2011	Ice	Gang Leader	"1.2"
2011	Underbelly NZ: Land of the Long Green Cloud	Billy Kirby	"Thirty of Silver/One of Gold"
2013	Harry	Eugene	"God Bless Brutus"
2012	A Bend in the Road	Bret	Short film
2023	Sincerely Truly Christmas	Matt	TV film

=== As producer ===
Year	Title	Notes
2009	I'm Not Harry Jenson	Feature film
2010	The Rogers Family Xmas	TV series
2011	Lambs	Short film
2014	Everything We Loved	Feature film
2014	The Dark Horse	Feature film
2017	Pork Pie	Feature film
2017	Human Traces	Feature film
2019	Guns Akimbo	Feature Film
2020	Shadow in the Cloud	Feature Film
2021	The Panthers	Miniseries
2023	Joika	Feature Film
