= James Napier Robertson =

New Zealand actor & filmmaker (born 1982)

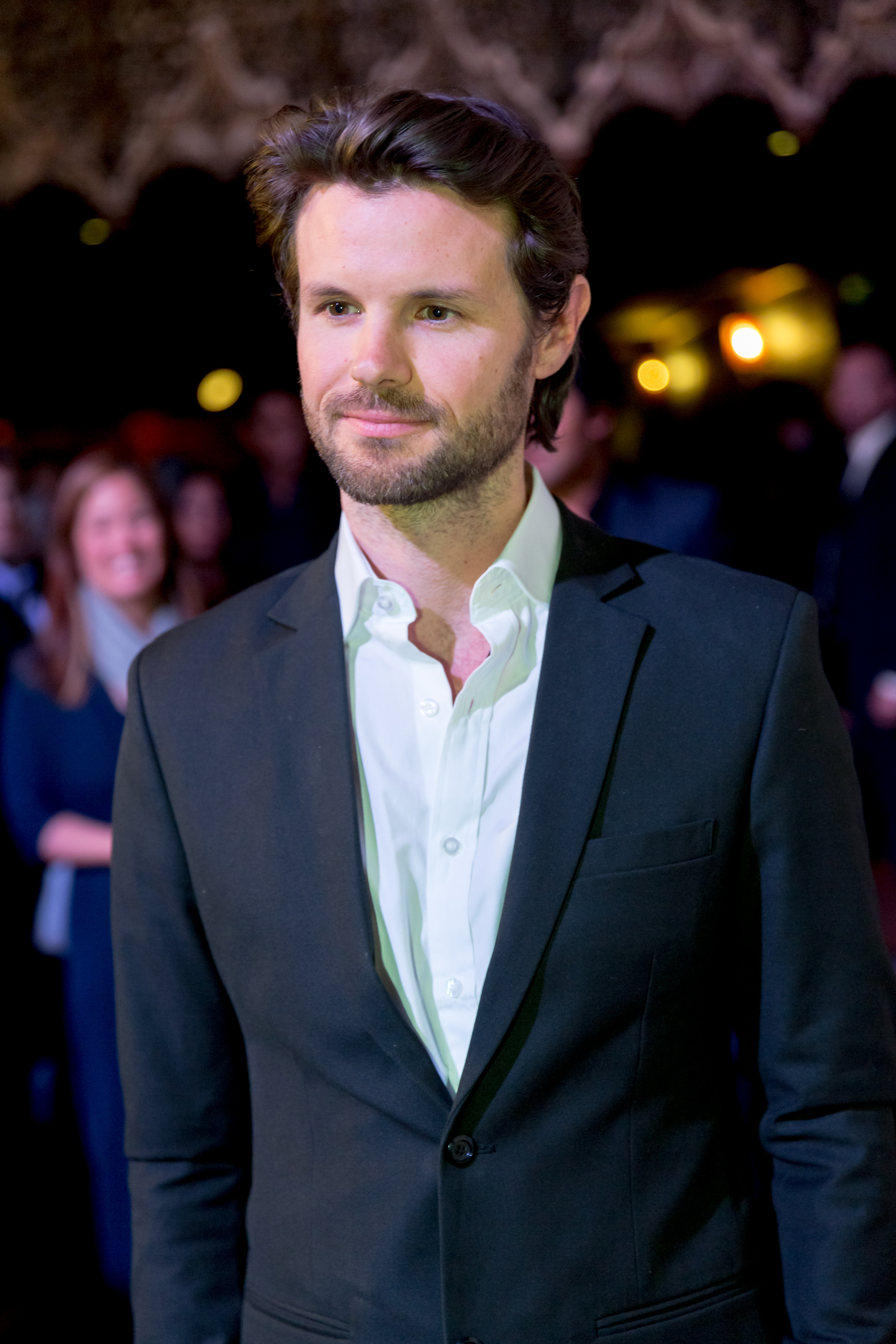
- Napier Robertson in 2016
- Born: James William Napier Robertson; 24 March 1982 (age 44); Auckland, New Zealand
- Occupations: Director, screenwriter, actor, producer
- Years active: 1995–present
- Height: 185.42 cm (6 ft 1 in)
- Children: 2
- Relatives: Marshall Napier (uncle); Jessica Napier (cousin)
- James Napier Robertson introducing himself recorded January 2015

James William Napier Robertson (born 24 March 1982) is a New Zealand writer, film director, actor and producer. He is best known for his role in Power Rangers Dino Thunder. In 2009 he wrote and directed I'm Not Harry Jenson, and in 2014 he wrote and directed The Dark Horse, for which he won Best Director, Best Screenplay and Best Film at the 2014 New Zealand Film Awards, and which was declared by New Zealand critics "One of the greatest New Zealand films ever made".

In 2022 Robertson wrote and directed on Māori land march biopic Whina starring Rena Owen, and in 2024 he wrote and directed Joika starring Diane Kruger and Talia Ryder, which was called "astonishingly beautiful" by The Dominion Post, with the Radio Times praising it as "powerful and often harrowing, a rich, visual feast contrasted with a bitter, edgy core and excellent ensemble.

Robertson also wrote and directed two episodes of the Logie Award winning crime drama Romper Stomper, and appeared earlier in his career as an actor in Shakespearean theater and several television productions including The Tribe and Being Eve, describing how his acting work "funded his early filmmaking".

== Early life ==
Born in Wellington, New Zealand, but moving to Auckland at a young age, Robertson grew up in Devonport and attended Takapuna Grammar School, where he first started acting in Shakespeare productions and musicals.

His uncle is actor Marshall Napier and his cousin is Marshall's daughter, actress Jessica Napier.

== Early career ==
Robertson joined a local outdoor Shakespeare Theatre Company in his late teens, which he performed with for a number of years, often at the Pumphouse Theatre Amphitheatre. He has described this time with the company as his favorite period of acting.

After this period he was cast in a number of local and international television shows which he acted in for the next few years, both in support and lead roles. He was first cast in Being Eve as Jared Preston, a wayward teenager at the titular Eve's school, then in Shortland Street, and Mercy Peak as Luke Bertram, an arsonist dealing with his mother's death by burning down local buildings until he is caught by the police.

In 2002 Robertson was cast for two seasons in UK show The Tribe, a post apocalyptic series about a virus that has wiped out all adults, leaving only young people to fight amongst each other. In 2004 he was cast for one season as a lead actor on US show Power Rangers Dino Thunder, playing Conner McKnight, a soccer player and the Red Ranger. The show was filmed in New Zealand and featured an almost entirely New Zealand cast, including friend and future film producer Tom Hern.

Throughout this period he said he was less interested in acting, instead using the money from these shows to fund the short films he was writing and directing in his early twenties and purchase film equipment.

== Recent work ==
In his mid twenties, Robertson wrote and directed his first feature film, I'm Not Harry Jenson, with friends Tom Hern and Edward Sampson both taking roles as producers in the film. The film premiered at the 2009 New Zealand International Film Festival and was nominated for Best Picture at the 2009 AFTA Awards (New Zealand Film and TV Awards). It was picked up by Rialto Distribution for a New Zealand wide theatrical release from January to March 2010 to strong reviews, but low box office.

=== The Dark Horse ===
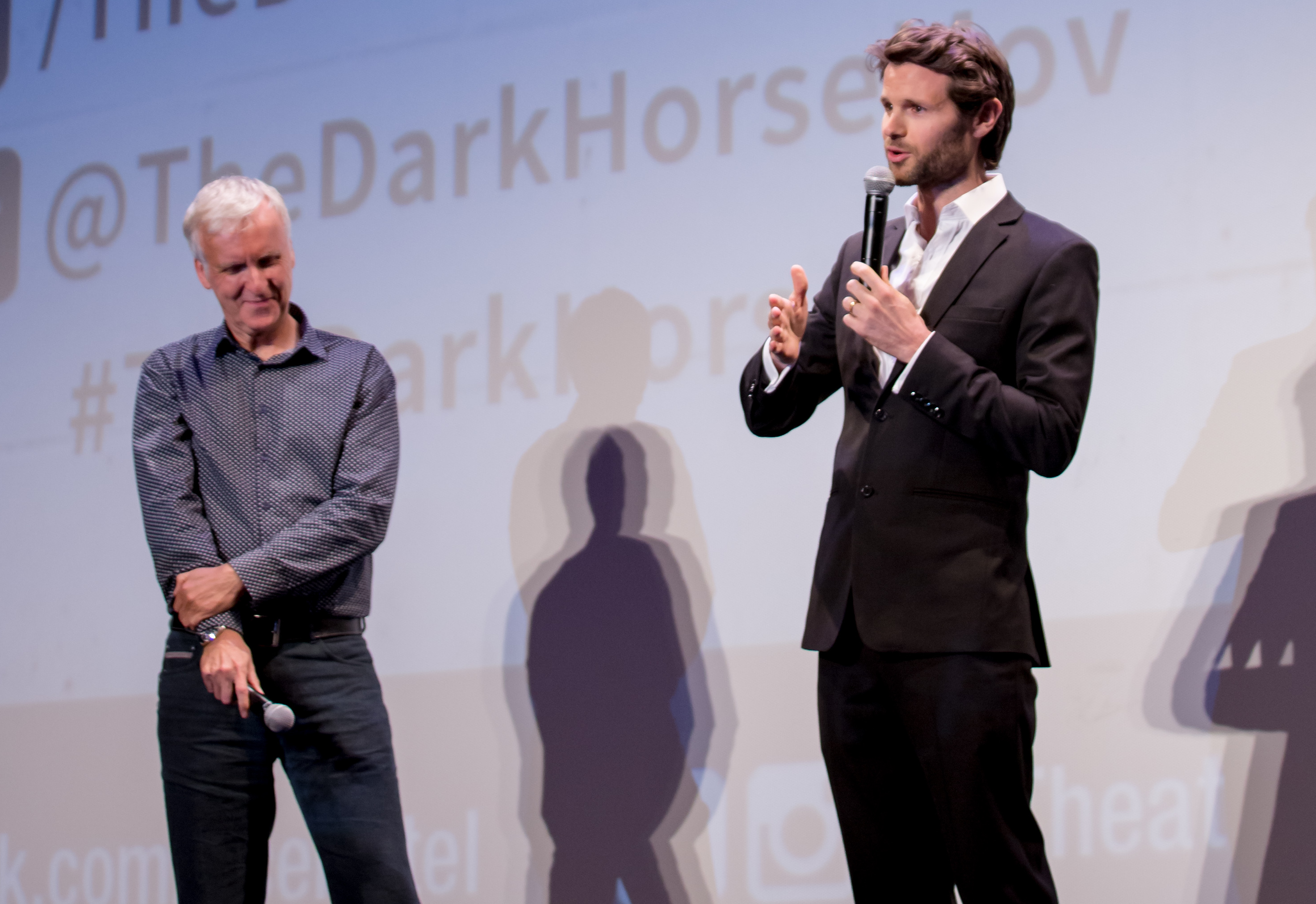
Robertson on stage with James Cameron

In 2010 Robertson started work on his second feature film, The Dark Horse, based on the life story of Genesis Potini, a Māori chess player who suffered from severe bipolar. Robertson stated he became very close friends with Potini, playing hundreds of games of chess with him while writing the screenplay. Robertson has been an avid chess player since a young age, which he cited as one of the things that inspired him to make The Dark Horse.

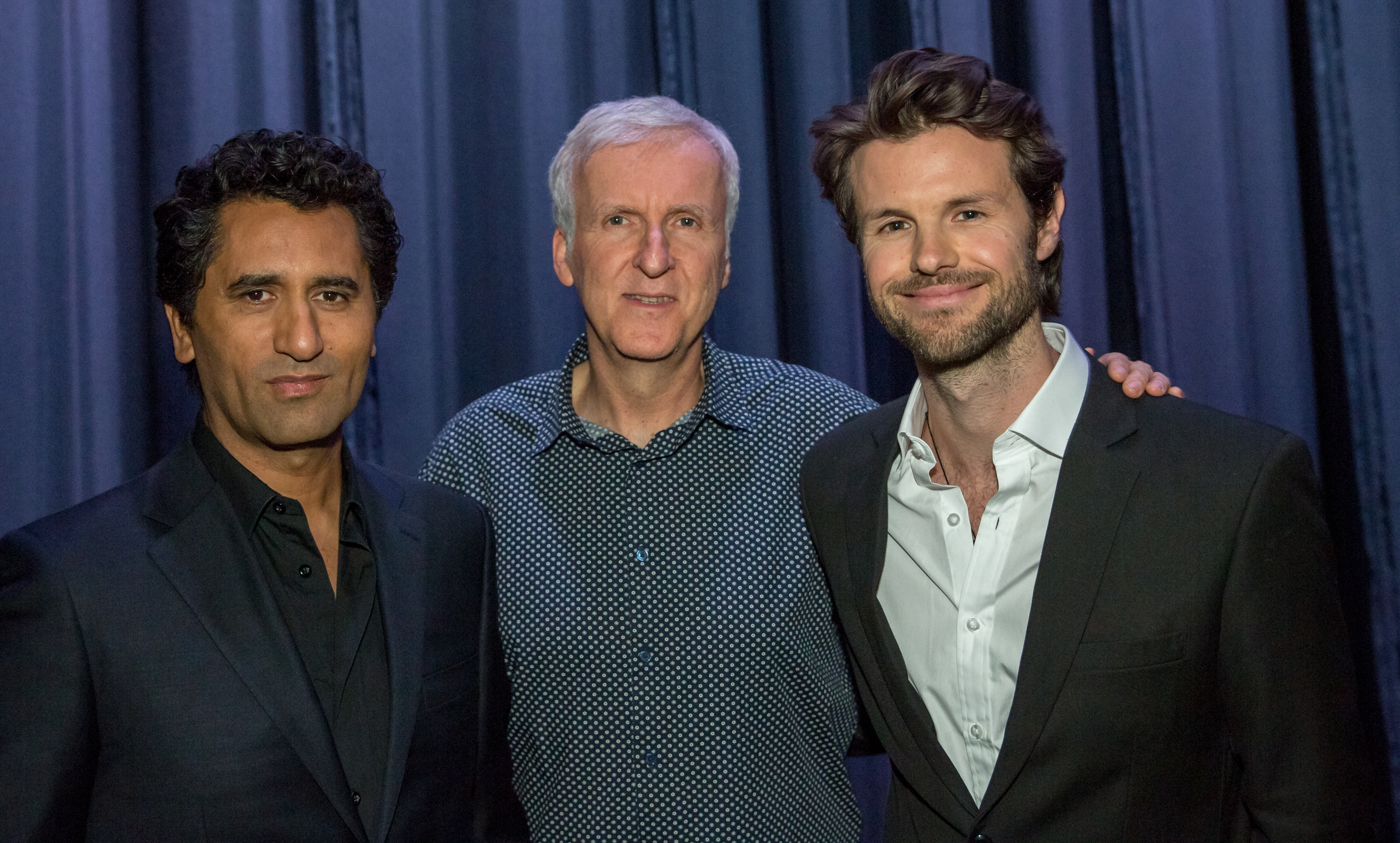
Cliff Curtis, James Cameron and Robertson appear at the U.S. premiere of The Dark Horse

The Dark Horse premiered as the Opening Night film at the NZIFF Film Festival on 17 July 2014, and was released across New Zealand on 31 July. The film was a New Zealand box office hit, grossing $2 million and receiving unanimously rave reviews. The New Zealand Herald rated it 5 stars, calling it "a great, deeply affecting movie", with "brave, assured and layered directing" and praising the "towering performance of Cliff Curtis". A review on Radio New Zealand declared it to be "one of the greatest New Zealand films ever made".

It premiered internationally at the 2014 Toronto International Film Festival. Variety called it "exceptional...the most deserving cinematic export to emerge from New Zealand in years". The Hollywood Reporter said it was "certain to attract awards attention", and Indiewire graded it an 'A', praising it as "moving and incredibly humanistic".

The European Premiere was held at the 2015 Rotterdam International Film Festival, where it won the Audience Award for Best Film. It also won the Best Actor Award for Cliff Curtis at the 2014 Asia Pacific Awards, and six awards at the 2014 New Zealand Film Awards, including Best Picture, Best Director and Best Screenplay. 2014 was dubbed the 'golden year' of New Zealand film.

The Dark Horse was released worldwide in 2015, and was released theatrically in the United States in 2016 where it was presented by director James Cameron.

=== Joika aka The American ===
Joika (alternative title The American), a 2023 New Zealand–Polish drama about American ballerina Joy Womack training at the prestigious Moscow Bolshoi Theatre, was filmed in Warsaw, Poland in February 2022, with post-production completed in Auckland, New Zealand.

The film premiered as the Closing Night Film at the 2023 Deauville American Film Festival, and was also screened at the 2024 Palm Springs International Film Festival and the 2024 Santa Barbara International Film Festival between 15–16 February 2024, where it won a number of awards.

It received favourable reviews from critics; Liam Maguren of Flicks opining that the film "delivers plenty of squirm-inducing suspense and a compelling moral quagmire." Maguren praised writer-director Napier Robertson and also praised the performances of the main cast members Talia Ryder and Diane Kruger. He also praised the film's choreography and handheld cinematography of Tomasz Naumiuk.

The Dominion Post gave the film 4 and a 1/2 stars and calling it "astonishingly beautiful", and the Radio Times gave it 4 stars, calling it "a rich, visual feast contrasted with a bitter, edgy core and excellent ensemble

== Personal life ==
Robertson has stated in interviews he has been a vegetarian since the age of four due to his love for animals, and has been a member of Greenpeace for most of his life. Animal advocacy group SAFE named him 'Hottest Vegetarian of 2014' alongside Academy Award winner Anna Paquin as a way of raising awareness for reducing animal cruelty.

== Filmography ==
=== Film ===
- Ishtar (Short, 2002) Writer, Director, Editor
- By Way of LA (Short, 2004) Writer, Director, Actor
- Two Cons, One Key (Short, 2005) Writer, Director
- Foul Play (Short, 2007) Writer, Director, Actor.
- I'm Not Harry Jenson (2009) Writer, Director
- Everything We Loved (2014) Co-Producer
- The Dark Horse (2014) Writer, Director
- Whina (2022) Writer, Director
- Joika (2023) Writer, Director

=== Television ===
- The Tribe (1999) TV Series .... Jay (Series 4–5, 2001/02)
- Being Eve (2001) TV Series .... Jared Preston (2001/02)
- Shortland Street (1992) TV Series .... Glen McNulty (2001)
- Mercy Peak
  - Light My Fire (2003).... Luke Bertram
  - Pride and Prejudice (2003).... Luke Bertram
- Power Rangers Ninja Storm (2003).... Eric McKnight
- Power Rangers Dino Thunder (2004).... Conner McKnight/Red Dino Ranger
- Power Rangers S.P.D. (2005).... Conner McKnight/Red Dino Ranger (guest role 2 episodes)
- Go Girls (2009) .... Mark
- Romper Stomper (2017) .... Director, Writer

=== Stage ===
- Joseph and the Technicolor Dreamcoat by Andrew Lloyd Webber (1997) – Role: Naphtali – Milford Playhouse
- The Mikado by Sir Arthur Sullivan (1997) – Role: The Mikado – Auckland Music Theatre
- The Tempest by William Shakespeare (1997) – Role: Antonio – Shakespeare in the Park – Outdoor Amphitheatre, Auckland, New Zealand
- Twelfth Night by William Shakespeare (1998) – Role: Fabian – Shakespeare in the Park – Outdoor Amphitheatre, Auckland, New Zealand
- A Midsummer Night's Dream by William Shakespeare (1998) – Role: Lysander – Shakespeare in the Park – Outdoor Amphitheatre, Auckland, New Zealand
- Romeo and Juliet by William Shakespeare (1999) – Role: Benvolio – Summer Shakespeare - Shoreside Theatre
- Much Ado About Nothing by William Shakespeare (2000) – Role: Claudio – Summer Shakespeare - Shoreside Theatre
- Julius Caesar by William Shakespeare (2001) – Role: Gaius Octavian – Shakespeare in the Park – Outdoor Amphitheatre, Auckland, New Zealand

== Awards and nominations ==
- Best Director - The Dark Horse - New Zealand Film Awards 2014
- Best Screenplay - The Dark Horse - New Zealand Film Awards 2014
- Best Director - The Dark Horse - Art Film Festival 2015
- New Filmmaker of the Year Award - SPADA Awards 2014
- Best Film Jury Award - The Dark Horse - St Tropez International Film Festival 2015
- Best Screenplay - The Dark Horse - New Zealand Screen Guild Awards 2014
- Best Film - The Dark Horse - New Zealand Film Awards 2014
- Best Film - The Dark Horse - Seattle International Film Festival 2015
- Best Film - The Dark Horse - San Francisco International Film Festival 2015
- Best Film Audience Award - The Dark Horse - Rotterdam International Film Festival 2015
- Best Film MovieZone Award - The Dark Horse - Rotterdam International Film Festival 2015
- Runner Up Best Film - The Dark Horse - Palm Springs International Film Festival 2015
- Best Film - Nominated - I'm Not Harry Jenson - NZ Film and TV Awards 2009
