= 2014 Rialto Channel New Zealand Film Awards =

- Awarded for: Excellence in New Zealand film
- Sponsored by: Rialto Channel
- Date: 12 December 2014
- Location: Shed 10, Queen's Wharf, Auckland
- Country: New Zealand
- Presented by: Ant Timpson and Hugh Sundae
- Reward: Moa trophy
- First award: 2014
- Website: http://www.nzfilmawards.co.nz

Television/radio coverage
- Network: Rialto Channel

The 2014 Rialto Channel New Zealand Film Awards was the third presentation of the New Zealand Film Awards, a New Zealand film industry award. The 2014 ceremony took place in Shed 10 on Queen's Wharf in Auckland on Friday 12 December 2014. It was webcast live on the New Zealand Herald website, and later broadcast on the Rialto Channel.

== Nominees and winners ==
Moas were awarded in 28 categories in three groups – features, documentaries and short films. The 2013 category of Best Technical Contribution to a Short Film was dropped, and the new category Best Visual Effects added for 2014. The awards were dominated by the feature film The Dark Horse, which won six of its 13 nominated categories, including Best Film, Best Director and Best Actor.

=== Features ===
Rialto Channel Best Film

- The Dark Horse
  - Everything We Loved
  - Housebound
  - The Dead Lands
  - The Last Saint

Flying Fish Best Director

- James Napier Robertson (The Dark Horse)
  - Max Currie (Everything We Loved)
  - Gerard Johnstone (Housebound)
  - Toa Fraser (The Dead Lands)
  - Rene Naufahu (The Last Saint)

Peter Yealands Wines Best Actor

- Cliff Curtis (The Dark Horse)
  - Matt Whelan (3 Mile Limit)
  - Nathan Meister (Realiti)
  - James Rolleston (The Dead Lands)
  - Beulah Koale (The Last Saint)

Peter Yealands Wines Best Actress

- Sia Trokenheim (Everything We Loved)
  - Morgana O'Reilly (Housebound)
  - Michelle Langstone (Realiti)
  - Joy Vaele (The Last Saint)
  - Antonia Prebble (The Cure)

Te Whanau O Waipareira Best Supporting Actor

- James Rolleston (The Dark Horse)
  - Wayne Hapi (The Dark Horse)
  - Leighton Cardno (Jake)
  - Lawrence Makoare (The Dead Lands)
  - Jonathan Brugh (What We Do in the Shadows)

Manukau Urban Maori Authority Best Supporting Actress

- Jackie van Beek (What We Do in the Shadows)
  - Raukura Turei (The Dead Lands)
  - Sophia Huybens (The Last Saint)
  - Vanessa Rare (The Z-Nail Gang)
  - Rima Te Wiata (Housebound)

Best Screenplay

- James Napier Robertson (The Dark Horse)
  - Max Currie (Everything We Loved)
  - Chad Taylor (Realiti)
  - Glenn Standring (The Dead Lands)
  - Rene Naufahu (The Last Saint)

Park Road Post Best Self Funded Film

- What We Do in the Shadows
  - Jake
  - Realiti
  - 3 Mile Limit
  - The Z-Nail Gang

NZ On Air Best Television Feature

- Consent: The Louise Nicholas Story
  - Erebus: Operation Overdue
  - The Kick
  - Field Punishment No 1
  - Pirates of the Airwaves

MAC Best Makeup Design

- Davina Lamont (The Dead Lands)
  - Jacinta Driver (Housebound)
  - Brae Toia and Julie Clark (I Survived a Zombie Holocaust)
  - Jane O'Kane (The Dark Horse)
  - Dannelle Satherly (What We Do in the Shadows)

Best Costume Design

- Barbara Darragh (The Dead Lands)
  - Lissy Patterson (Housebound)
  - Gabrielle Stevenson (The Cure)
  - Kristin Seth (The Dark Horse)
  - Amanda Neale (What We Do in the Shadows)

Images & Sound Best Visual Effects

- George Zwier (The Dead Lands)
  - Peter McCully (3 Mile Limit)
  - Matthew Westbrooke (Housebound)
  - Sam Scott (I Survived a Zombie Holocaust)
  - Stan Alley (What We Do in the Shadows)

Bigpop Studios Best Sound

- Simon Riley, Mike Hedges and Tim Chaproniere (What We Do in the Shadows)
  - Ben Sinclair, Chris Todd (Erewhon)
  - Franklin Road Sound Post Production (Housebound)
  - Chris Todd, Nick Buckton, Pete Smith, Tim Chaproniere, Fred Enholmer (The Dark Horse)
  - Lee Herrick, James Hayday, Sven Taits and Adam Martin (The Dead Lands)

Bigpop Studios Best Score

- Dana Lund (The Dark Horse)
  - Tom Mcleod (3 Mile Limit)
  - Rachel Shearer (Erewhon)
  - Victoria Kelly (Realiti)
  - Don McGlashan (The Dead Lands)

Mandy VFX Best Editor

- Cushla Dillon (Orphans & Kingdoms)
  - Dan Kircher (Everything We Loved)
  - Peter Roberts (The Dark Horse)
  - Dan Kircher (The Dead Lands)
  - Eric de Beus (The Last Saint)

Tommy & James Best Production Design

- Ra Vincent (What We Do in the Shadows)
  - Jane Bucknell & Anya Whitlock (Housebound)
  - Kim Sinclair (The Dark Horse)
  - Grant Major (The Dead Lands)
  - Brant Fraser (The Last Saint)

Queenstown Camera ARRI Best Cinematography

- Dave Garbett (Everything We Loved)
  - DJ Stipsen (3 Mile Limit)
  - Simon Riera & Ado Greshoff (Housebound)
  - Simon Raby (Orphans & Kingdoms)
  - Denson Baker (The Dark Horse)

Letterboxd Best Poster Design

- Andrejs Skuja, Johnny Lyon (Housebound)
  - Kirk Bremner, Luke Bremner (A Motel and a Hard Place)
  - Rene Naufahu & Farini Jnr. (The Last Saint)
  - Alastair Tye Samson, Doug Dillaman & Lucas Brooking (Jake)
  - Jeremy Saunders (The Dead Lands)

=== Documentaries ===
Best Documentary

- Hip Hop-eration
  - Erebus: Operation Overdue
  - Voices of the Land Nga Reo o te Whenua
  - Cap Bocage
  - Hot Air

Vendetta Films Best Documentary Director

- Bryn Evans (Hip Hop-eration)
  - Peter Burger, & Charlotte Purdy (Erebus: Operation Overdue)
  - Paul Wolffram (Voices of the Land – Nga Reo o te Whenua)
  - Jim Marbrook (Cap Bocage)
  - Gerard Smyth (Aunty and the Star People)

Lotech Best Documentary Editor

- Simon Coldrick (Erebus: Operation Overdue)
  - Annie Collins (Voices of the Land – Nga Reo o te Whenua)
  - Peter Roberts (Hip Hop-eration)
  - Jim Marbrook and Prisca Bouchet (Cap Bocage)
  - Abi King-Jones (Hot Air)

NZ Broadcasting School at CPIT Best Documentary Cinematography

- Bevan Crothers (Hip Hop-eration)
  - Toby Ricketts (Manila – No Limitations)
  - Alun Bollinger and Luke Frater (Voices of the Land – Nga Reo o te Whenua)
  - James Ellis, Dave Perry (Into the Void)
  - Gerard Smyth & Jacob Bryant (Aunty and the Star People)

=== Short films ===
Canon Best Short Film

- Eleven
  - Ross & Beth
  - The Tide Keeper
  - The Keeper
  - Whisker

Halcyon Digital Best Self-Funded Short Film

- Skin
  - Mi Amigo Mandarina
  - The Last Night
  - Over the Moon
  - A Lesson on Probability

Actors Agents Association of New Zealand Best Short Film Actor

- John Clarke (Ross & Beth)
  - Charlie Bleakley (Coconut)
  - Alan James Drum-Garcia (Mi Amigo Mandarina)
  - Cohen Holloway (The Last Night)
  - Elliot Travers (Mis-Drop)

Actors Agents Association of New Zealand Best Short Film Actress

- Tahei Simpson (Home)
  - Anna Jullienne (Over The Moon)
  - Phoebe McLeod (Snip)
  - Morgan Albrecht (After Wonderland)
  - Hayley Sproull (School Night)

PLS Best Cinematography in a Short Film

- Grant McKinnon (Ross & Beth)
  - Ben Montgomery, Chris Pryor (The Tide Keeper)
  - Germain McMicking (The Keeper)
  - Ian McCarroll (Whisker)
  - Mathew Knight (The Last Night)

NZ Herald Online – Best Short Film Script

- Kate Prior (Eleven)
  - Alyx Duncan (The Tide Keeper)
  - Charlie Bleakley & Cohen Holloway (Coconut)
  - Tom Furniss (Mi Amigo Mandarina)
  - Hamish Bennett (Ross & Beth)
