= List of New Zealand actors =

The following is a list of New Zealand actors.

== A ==
- Courtney Abbot (born 1989) – actress
- Frankie Adams (born 1994) – actress
- Andy Anderson (born 1947) – actor
- Michelle Ang (born 1983) – actress
- KJ Apa (born 1997) – actor

== B ==
- Tim Balme (born 1967) – actor and screenwriter
- Kylie Bax (born 1975) – model and actress
- Zoë Bell (born 1978) – stuntwoman and actress
- Manu Bennett (born 1969) – actor
- Roy Billing (born 1947) – actor
- Ken Blackburn (born 1935) – actor
- Angela Bloomfield (born 1972) – actress
- Helen Brew (1922–2013) – actress
- Jaquie Brown (born 1975) – actress
- Alison Bruce – actress
- Jonathan Brugh – comedian, actor, musician

== C ==
- Dwayne Cameron (born 1981) – actor
- Keisha Castle-Hughes (born 1990) – Academy Award-nominated actress
- Milo Cawthorne (born 1989) – actor
- Lisa Chappell (born 1968) – actress
- John Clarke (1948–2017) – actor, comedian (moved to Australia)
- Jemaine Clement (born 1974) – half of the comedy duo Flight of the Conchords
- Danielle Cormack (born 1970) – actress
- Shane Cortese (born 1968) – actor
- Russell Crowe (born 1964) – actor and singer
- Marton Csokas (born 1966) – actor
- Cliff Curtis (born 1964) – actor
- Kimberley Crossman (born 1990) – actress / author

== D ==
- Alan Dale (born 1947) – actor
- Rhys Darby (born 1974) – actor and comedian
- Mana Hira Davis – stunt man
- Tammy Davis – actor
- Meighan Desmond (born 1977) – actress
- Jodie Dorday – actress
- Michael Dorman (born 1981) – actor
- Angela Dotchin (born 1974) – actress

== E ==
- Kate Elliott (born 1981) – actress
- Peter Elliott – actor
- Pat Evison (1924–2010) – actress
- Barbara Ewing (born 1939) – actress

== F ==
- David Fane (born 1966) – actor and comedian
- Deb Filler (born 1954) – actress
- Kerry Fox (born 1966) – actress
- Ben Fransham – actor

== G ==
- Jon Gadsby (1953–2015) – actor
- James Gaylyn (born 1954) – actor
- Rebecca Gibney (born 1964) – actress
- Daniel Gillies (born 1976) – actor
- Paul Gittins – actor

== H ==
- Mark Hadlow (born 1957) – actor
- Kate Harcourt (born 1927) – actress
- Miranda Harcourt (born 1962) – actress
- Lisa Harrow (born 1943) – actress
- George Henare (born 1945) – actor
- Martin Henderson (born 1974) – actor
- Bruce Hopkins (born 1955) – actor, voice artist, TV presenter, MC, Action Actors founder; Lord Of The Rings
- Rachel House (born 1971) – actress
- Rachel Hunter (born 1969) – model
- Michael Hurst (born 1957) – British-born actor, director and writer; Hercules: The Legendary Journeys and companion series Xena: Warrior Princess
- Anna Hutchison (born 1986) – actress

== J ==
- Billy T. James (1948–1991) – comedian, actor
- Erana James (born 1999) – actress
- Anna Jullienne (born 1982) – actress

== K ==
- Wi Kuki Kaa (1938–2006) – actor
- Simone Kessell (born 1975) – actress
- Oscar Kightley (born 1969) – actor (born in Apia, Samoa)
- Charles Knight, aka Tankboy (born 1967) – actor and live stunt performer

== L ==
- Jay Laga'aia (born 1963) – actor and singer
- Peter Land (born 1953) – West End and Broadway actor, singer
- Lucy Lawless (born 1968) – actress, Xena: Warrior Princess, Spartacus: Blood and Sand
- Yvonne Lawley (1913-1999) – actress
- Bruno Lawrence (1941–1995) – actor and musician with band Blerta (born in England)
- Nathaniel Lees (born 1972) – actor
- John Leigh (born 1965) – actor
- Melanie Lynskey (born 1977) – Hollywood actress

== M ==
- Lawrence Makoare (born 1968) – actor
- Robyn Malcolm (born 1965) – actress
- James Henry Marriott (1799–1886) – actor (born in England, arrived in New Zealand 1843)
- Sally Martin (born 1985) – actress
- Rose McIver (born 1988) – actress
- Bret McKenzie (born 1976) – half of the comedy duo Flight of the Conchords
- Thomasin Harcourt McKenzie (born 2000) – actress
- David McPhail (1945–2021) – actor
- Michael Miles (1919–1971) – game show host
- Temuera Morrison (born 1960) – actor
- Ian Mune (born 1941) – actor, director, screenwriter

== N ==
- Marshall Napier (1951–2022) – actor
- Jessica Napier (born 1979) – actress
- Sam Neill (1947–2026) – actor (born in Northern Ireland, raised in New Zealand)
- Tania Nolan (born 1983) - actress

== O ==
- Dean O'Gorman (born 1976) – actor
- Rena Owen (born 1962) – actress
- Stefania LaVie Owen (born 1997) – actress (born in Miami, Florida; New-Zealand-American)

== P ==
- Anna Paquin (born 1982) – actress (born in Canada, raised in New Zealand)
- Rawiri Paratene – actor
- Craig Parker (born 1970) – actor, Shortland Street, Legend of the Seeker, Spartacus: Blood and Sand
- Nyree Dawn Porter (1936–2001) – actress
- Simon Prast (born 1962) – actor
- Antonia Prebble (born 1984) – actress

== R ==
- Chris Rankin (born 1983) – actor
- Cameron Rhodes (born 1967) – actor
- Greer Robson (born 1971) – actress
- Ilona Rodgers (born 1942) – actress
- James Rolleston (born 1997) – actor
- Caleb Ross (born 1981) – actor
- Paolo Rotondo (born 1971) – Italian-born actor
- Alison Routledge (born 1960) – actress
- Jay Ryan (born 1981) – actor Beauty & the Beast

== S ==
- Tom Sainsbury (born 1982) – actor, writer, filmmaker, comedian
- Madeleine Sami (born 1980) – actress
- Brian Sergent (born 1959) – actor
- Emmett Skilton (born 1987) – actor
- Kerry Smith (1953–2011) – actress
- Kevin Smith (1963–2002) – actor
- Jessica Grace Smith (born 1986) - actress
- Miriama Smith (born 1976) – actress
- Ewen Solon (1917–1985) – actor
- Antony Starr (born 1975) – actor, Banshee, Outrageous Fortune, Rush, Tricky Business
- Matthew Sunderland (born c. 1972) – actor

== T ==
- Olivia Tennet (born 1991) – actress
- Beryl Te Wiata (1925–2017) – actress, author, scriptwriter
- Inia Te Wiata (1915–1971) – opera singer, actor, carver
- Rima Te Wiata (born 1963) – actress
- Erik Thomson (born 1967) – actor
- Josh Thomson (born 1981) – actor and comedian
- Grant Tilly (1937–2012) – actor
- Joel Tobeck (born 1971) – actor, Tangle, The Doctor Blake Mysteries, Xena Warrior Princess, Hercules: The Legendary Journeys, Young Hercules, Sons of Anarchy, 1 & 2, Ash vs Evil Dead, One Lane Bridge
- Selwyn Toogood (1916–2001) – actor and game show host
- John Tui (born 1975) – actor
- Lani Tupu (born 1955) – actor
- Jared Turner (born 1978) – actor

== U ==
- Karl Urban (born 1972) – actor

== W ==
- Taika Waititi (born 1975) – actor, director, comedian
- Jennifer Ward-Lealand (born 1962) – theatre and film actor, director, teacher and intimacy co-ordinator
- Matt Whelan (born 1985) – actor
- Davina Whitehouse (1912–2002) – actress (born in the UK)
- Annie Whittle – actress and singer
- Brooke Williams (born 1984) – actress
- Laura Wilson (born 1983) – actress
- Katie Wolfe (born 1968) – actress
- Alma Woods (1918-2005) – actress, producer and director; founder of Howick Little Theatre

== X ==
- Mika X (born 1962) – actor, director, comedian
