= Chad Taylor =

Chad Taylor may refer to:

- Chad Taylor (drummer) (born 1973), American drummer and composer
- Chad Taylor (guitarist) (born 1970), American guitarist in the bands The Gracious Few and Live
- Chad Taylor (politician) (born 1973), District Attorney of Shawnee County, Kansas
- Chad Taylor (writer) (born 1964), New Zealand writer
