= The Dark Horse (2014 film) =

- Theatrical release poster
- Directed by: James Napier Robertson
- Written by: James Napier Robertson
- Produced by: Tom Hern
- Starring: Cliff Curtis; James Rolleston
- Cinematography: Denson Baker
- Edited by: Peter Roberts
- Music by: Dana Lund
- Production companies: Four Knights Film; Southern Light Films
- Distributed by: Transmission Films
- Release date: 17 July 2014 (New Zealand)
- Running time: 125 minutes
- Country: New Zealand
- Language: English
- Budget: $2.1 million
- Box office: $1.9 million

The Dark Horse is a 2014 New Zealand drama film written and directed by James Napier Robertson and starring Cliff Curtis and James Rolleston. It won Best Picture, Best Director, Best Screenplay, Best Actor, Best Supporting Actor and Best Score at the 2014 New Zealand Film Awards, Best Film at the 2015 Seattle International Film Festival (SIFF), 2015 San Francisco International Film Festival (SFIFF) and 2015 Rotterdam International Film Festival (IFFR), was New York Times Critics' Pick and Time Magazine Critics' Pick, and was labeled by leading New Zealand critics as "One of the greatest New Zealand films ever made". It premiered at the 2014 Toronto International Film Festival (TIFF), and was created by production company Four Knights Film. The film was released theatrically in the U.S. by Broad Green Pictures on 1 April 2016.

== Plot ==
The Dark Horse is based on the real-life story of Genesis Potini, a brilliant New Zealand chess player who suffered from severe bipolar disorder. The film begins with him walking down a street in the rain, before walking into an antique store and playing a chess game with himself. He has flashbacks of being taught chess by his older brother, and eventually is taken away by police officers to a hospital because of his mental state. He is released into the care of his brother Ariki, who allows him to sleep in his son's room. Upon hearing about a chess club run by his old chess buddy Noble Keelan, he goes around to his house early in the morning to ask to join. He is told he can only do so if he promises to not "rock the boat." Genesis meets the Eastern Knights Chess club in a shed where he learns that they only have one chess board, and the kids are not particularly motivated. He introduces himself and discloses that he wants to lead them to the Junior National Championships in Auckland, something Noble is initially frustrated with Genesis about. Mana, Ariki's son, followed him to the club, and it is revealed that he will be patched into his father's Gang, the Vagrants, on his birthday. He is given over to Mutt to harden him up. Ariki, believing that Genesis could interfere with this process asks him to leave. Genesis begins sleeping on the monument on Kaiti Hill, and leading meetings at the Chess club, now held at the marae with new chess sets. Mana, though initially hostile towards Genesis begins to see him more regularly, and joins the chess club. Mana reveals that he has been abused and urinated on by Mutt as part of his gang initiation. He also has a V tattooed on his face.

The mother of one of the members of Eastern Knights finds out that Genesis is homeless, and refuses to let her son participate, sending him into another mental breakdown. Sandy allows him to sleep at a friend's house, and they all prepare to go to Auckland for the championship. Mana realizes he cannot come as it is on the day that he will be patched, and leaves angrily. Genesis attempts to reason with Ariki, but he refuses to let Mana leave. On the day they leave for Auckland, Genesis stops at the monument to pick up a distraught Mana, and says that Ariki has allowed him to come. They go to Auckland, and all the members of Eastern Knights lose their games apart from Michael and Mana. That night, Mana reveals that he knows Genesis lied about him having permission to come, but that Mana knows his father is dying. He ends up losing his match the next day, but Michael goes on to compete in the final. Genesis repeatedly calls out during the final, and has to be sent outside, but Michael ends up winning the final. Ariki arrives shortly after, and punches Genesis before he yells at Mana to get in the car. The Eastern Knights travel back to Gisborne, and Genesis is visibly upset. He goes over to his brother's to find his nephew, who is unconscious with a black eye. It is revealed that he has just been patched, and Mutt begins beating Genesis, but is stopped by Ariki. Genesis removes Mana's jacket, and they walk out together, being followed and verbally abused by Mutt. Other members of the gang begin beating Mutt, and Genesis and Mana leave. The closing montage reveals that the Eastern Knights chess club is still being run, and that Genesis died in 2011.

== Cast ==
- Cliff Curtis as Genesis
- James Rolleston as Mana
- Wayne Hapi as Ariki
- Kirk Torrance as Noble
- Miriama McDowell as Sandy
- Baz Te Hira as Mutt
- Xavier Horan as Jedi
- James Napier Robertson as Dave

== Real-life basis ==
The character Curtis plays, Genesis, is inspired by real-life Gisborne speed chess player and coach Genesis Potini, who died in 2011. By teaching local youth to play chess, he hoped to give them a positive focus in life and dissuade them from getting involved in gangs and crime. Potini struggled with bipolar disorder, requiring frequent hospital stays. Potini had been the subject of a well received 2003 documentary film, Dark Horse. At the request of director James Napier Robertson, Curtis gained close to 27 kg (60 pounds) in weight and stayed in character for the entirety of the shoot to play Genesis. Napier Robertson also had Curtis study chess with some of Potini's erstwhile friends, including FIDE Master Ewen Green.

== Release ==
=== Box office ===
The Dark Horse grossed $67,533 in the United States and Canada and $1.8 million in other countries for a worldwide total of $1.9 million, against a production budget of $2.1 million.

=== Critical reception ===
On review aggregator Rotten Tomatoes, the film has an approval rating of 97%, based on 62 reviews, with an average rating of 7.5/10. The site's critical consensus reads, "Led by an outstanding performance from Cliff Curtis, The Dark Horse tackles complex themes with a richly layered, unpredictable, and deeply affecting story." On Metacritic, the film holds a rating of 77 out of 100, based on 20 critics, indicating "generally favorable reviews". Upon its premiere as the Opening Night film of the New Zealand International Film Festival on 17 July 2014, The Dark Horse was declared by the RNZ National Review "One of the greatest New Zealand films ever made". The film went on to become a New Zealand box office hit, grossing $2 million and receiving unanimously strong reviews. The New Zealand Herald rated it 5 stars, calling it "a great, deeply affecting movie", praising the "brave, assured and layered directing" and the "towering performance of Cliff Curtis". It was released theatrically in Australia on 20 November 2014. The Australian called it "outstanding ... a Kiwi – and largely Maori – work of the highest artistic excellence"; the Sydney Morning Herald praised it as "possibly the best movie to come out of New Zealand since Once Were Warriors in 1994". It premiered internationally at the 2014 Toronto International Film Festival. Variety calling it "exceptional...the most deserving cinematic export to emerge from New Zealand in years", The Hollywood Reporter announcing it "certain to attract awards attention", and Indiewire grading it an 'A', praising it as "moving and incredibly humanistic."

== Awards and nominations ==
Year	Award	Category	Work	Result	Ref.
2014	Asia Pacific Screen Awards	Best Performance by an Actor	Cliff Curtis	Won	
2014	2014 Rialto Channel New Zealand Film Awards	Best Film	The Dark Horse	Won	
2014	2014 Rialto Channel New Zealand Film Awards	Best Director	James Napier Robertson	Won	
2014	2014 Rialto Channel New Zealand Film Awards	Best Screenplay	James Napier Robertson	Won	
2014	2014 Rialto Channel New Zealand Film Awards	Best Actor	Cliff Curtis	Won	
2014	2014 Rialto Channel New Zealand Film Awards	Best Supporting Actor	James Rolleston	Won	
2014	2014 Rialto Channel New Zealand Film Awards	Best Score	Dana Lund	Won	
2014	2014 Rialto Channel New Zealand Film Awards	Best Supporting Actor	Wayne Hapi	Nominated	
2014	2014 Rialto Channel New Zealand Film Awards	Best Make-Up	Jane O'Kane	Nominated	
2014	2014 Rialto Channel New Zealand Film Awards	Best Costume Design	Kristin Seth	Nominated	
2014	2014 Rialto Channel New Zealand Film Awards	Best Editing	Peter Roberts	Nominated	
2014	2014 Rialto Channel New Zealand Film Awards	Best Sound	Chris Todd, Nick Buckton, Fred Enholmer, Tim Chaproniere	Nominated	
2014	2014 Rialto Channel New Zealand Film Awards	Best Production Design	Kim Sinclair	Nominated	
2014	2014 Rialto Channel New Zealand Film Awards	Best Cinematographer	Denson Baker	Nominated	
2014	New Zealand Writers Guild	Best Feature Film	The Dark Horse	Won	
2015	Art Film Fest	Best Director	James Napier Robertson	Won	
2015	Art Film Fest	Best Film	The Dark Horse	Nominated	
2015	Dublin Film Critics' Circle	Best Actor	Cliff Curtis	Won	
2015	Dublin Film Critics' Circle	Best Film	The Dark Horse	Nominated	
2015	Heartland Film Festival	Truly Moving Picture Award	The Dark Horse	Won	
2015	International Film Festival Rotterdam	Audience Award	James Napier Robertson	Won	
2015	International Film Festival Rotterdam	MovieZone Award	The Dark Horse	Won	
2015	Munich Film Festival	Best International Film	The Dark Horse	Nominated	
2015	Munich Film Festival	Best Film By An Emerging Director	James Napier Robertson	Nominated	
2015	Seattle International Film Festival	Best Film	The Dark Horse	Won	
2015	Seattle International Film Festival	Best Actor	Cliff Curtis	Won	
2015	San Francisco International Film Festival	Best Film	The Dark Horse	Won	
2015	Palm Springs International Film Festival	Audience Award	The Dark Horse	Won	
2015	Washington DC Film Festival	Commendation	The Dark Horse	Won	
2015	St Tropez International Film Festival	Best Film	The Dark Horse	Won	
