= Beulah Koale =

New Zealand actor

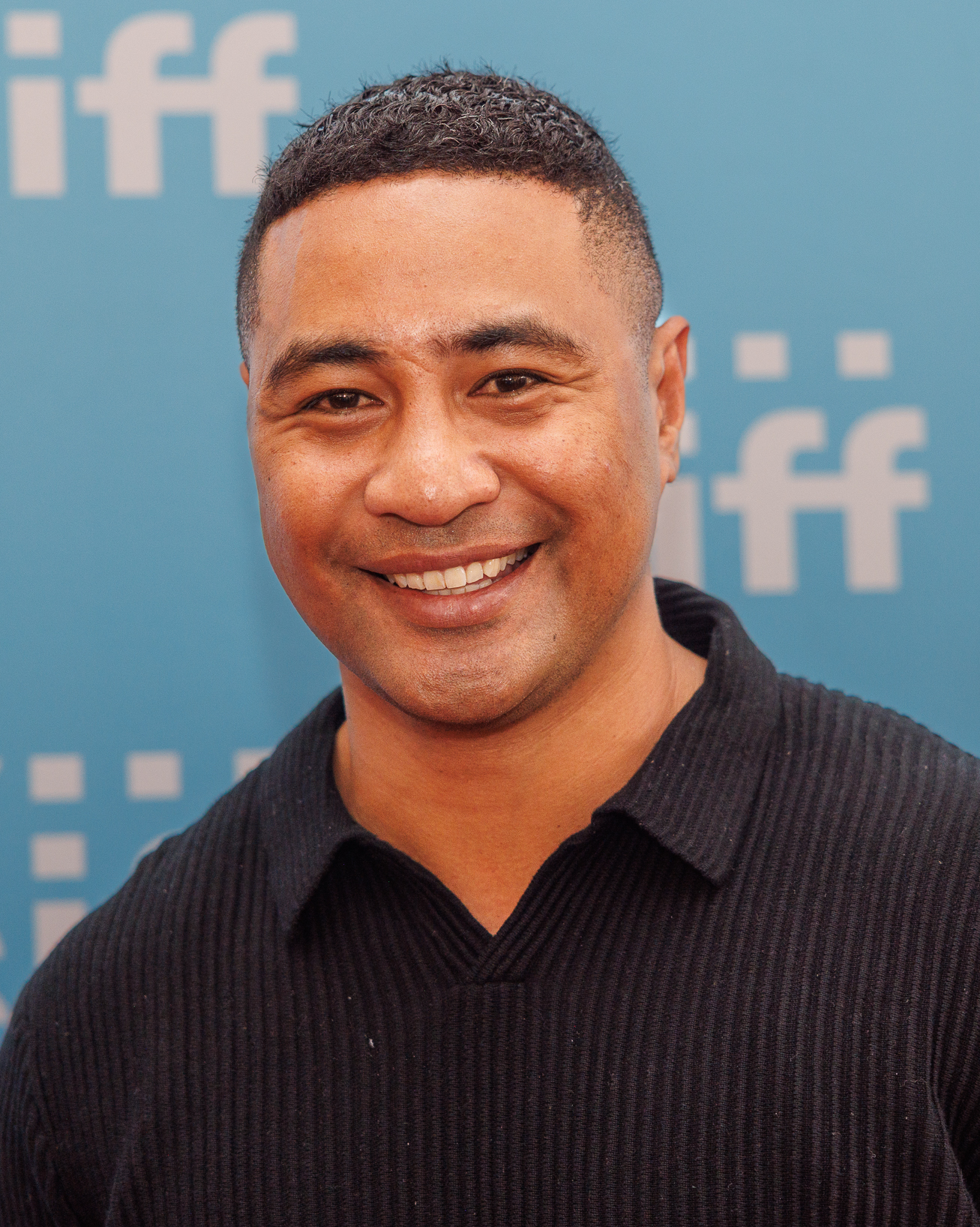
- Koale in 2025
- Born: 26 October 1991 (age 35); Auckland, New Zealand
- Other name: Piula
- Education: Tangaroa College
- Occupation: Actor
- Years active: 2010–present
- Spouse: Georgia Otene (m. 2019)
- Children: 3

Beulah Koale (/ˈbjuːlə ˈkwɑːleɪ/) is a New Zealand actor best known for portraying Officer Junior Reigns in CBS reboot series Hawaii Five-0.

== Early life ==
Koale was born at Middlemore Hospital in Auckland, and was raised in the nearby suburb of Ōtara. He is of Samoan descent.

Koale was raised within a religious family and regularly performed in church productions.

== Career ==
Koale joined the theatre company, Massive Company. During his time working with Massive, Beulah has performed in acclaimed shows Havoc in the Garden in 2011, and The Brave in 2012.

In 2010, Koale starred in the award-winning short film Manurewa, which screened at both the Melbourne and Berlin film festivals; and subsequently won the Crystal Bear for best short in the youth section at Berlin.

Koale stars in the sci-fi thriller Dual alongside Karen Gillan and Aaron Paul, which is filmed entirely in Tampere, Finland.

== Personal life ==
Koale is the oldest of six siblings, having four younger brothers and a younger sister. He has twin sons with his wife, Georgia Otene, whom he married in January 2019 in his hometown. Koale has said that his favourite film is The Lion King. He has multiple idols, including Cliff Curtis and Denzel Washington.

== Filmography ==
=== Film ===
Year	Film	Role	Notes
2010	Granda	Cool Samoan Boy	Short
2010	Manurewa	Issac	Short
2012	Suni Man	Suni	Short
2012	Tatau	Young Siaki	Short
2013	Fantail	Chocolate Milk Guy	
2014	The Kick	Fraser Tech Flyhalf	TV movie
2014	The Last Saint	Minka	
2016	One Thousand Ropes	Molesi	Movie
2017	Thank You for Your Service	Tausolo Aieti	
2017	STRAY		
2020	Shadow in the Cloud	Williams	
2022	Dual	Peter	
2023	Next Goal Wins	Daru Taumua	
2024	Tinā	Sio	
2025	Ash	Kevin	

=== Television ===
Year	Title	Role	Notes
2012–2013; 2014	Shortland Street	Jared Afeaki	
2013	Harry	Lua Matola	3 episodes
2013	Fresh	Himself	
2016	The Cul De Sac	Lucas	6 episodes
2017–2020	Hawaii Five-0	Junior Reigns	Main: season 8–10
2020	Magnum P.I.	Junior Reigns	1 episode
2022	NCIS: Hawaiʻi	David Sola	2 episodes

=== Theatre ===
Year	Film	Role	Notes
2011	Havoc in the Garden	Meleki	
2012	The Brave	Himself	
2014	Black Faggot		
2015	The Events		

== Awards and nominations ==
Year	Award	Category	Work	Result
2010	Berlin International Film Festival	Best Short Film – Youth Section	Manurewa	Won
2014	New Zealand Film and Television Awards	Best Actor	The Last Saint	Nominated
