= Max Currie (director) =

New Zealand director

- Born: Palmerston North, New Zealand
- Occupations: Director, screenwriter

Max Currie is a New Zealand film director and screenwriter, most noted for his 2020 film Rūrangi.

== Biography ==
Currie grew up in Palmerston North, and is the son of a microbiologist and a kindergarten teacher. Currie attended university, and later spent a year in Germany, working as a chef in an Australian-themed restaurant. He moved to New York City as the spouse of a diplomat, and worked as a bartender at a gay bar on the Lower East Side.

Currie was formerly a reporter and presenter for the documentary television series Queer Nation, and a writer for the soap opera Shortland Street. His debut film Everything We Loved was released in 2014, garnering him nominations for Best Director and Best Screenplay at the 2014 Rialto Channel New Zealand Film Awards.

Currie directed Rūrangi which began as a web series before being edited into a feature film. The film premiered at the New Zealand International Film Festival in 2020, and won the award for Best Feature at the 2020 Frameline Film Festival. The film was made into a TV series which won Best Short-Form Series at the 50th International Emmy Awards in 2022.

In 2021, Currie appeared as a member of the Pit Crew in the first season of RuPaul's Drag Race Down Under. In 2023, he appeared as a special guest in the third season of RuPaul's Drag Race Down Under.

== Personal life ==
Currie is gay.
