= Pork Pie (film) =

2017 New Zealand film

- Film poster
- Directed by: Matt Murphy
- Written by: Matt Murphy
- Based on: Goodbye Pork Pie by Geoff Murphy and Ian Mune
- Produced by: Tom Hern
- Starring: Dean O'Gorman; James Rolleston; Ashleigh Cummings
- Cinematography: Crighton Bone
- Edited by: Jonathan Woodford-Robinson
- Music by: Jonathan Crayford
- Production company: Four Knights Film
- Distributed by: StudioCanal
- Release dates: 2 February 2017 (New Zealand; theatrical)
- Running time: 105 minutes
- Country: New Zealand
- Language: English
- Budget: US$3,800,000
- Box office: US$797,639 (Worldwide)

Pork Pie (also known as Joyride in certain countries) is a 2017 New Zealand road comedy film written and directed by New Zealander Matt Murphy and produced by Tom Hern. The film is a remake of the 1981 movie Goodbye Pork Pie, the first New Zealand film to win a substantial local audience. The remake stars Dean O'Gorman, James Rolleston and Ashleigh Cummings as a trio of accidental outlaws who travel the length of New Zealand in a stolen orange New Mini.

== Cast ==
- Dean O'Gorman as Jon
- James Rolleston as Luke Anahera
- Ashleigh Cummings as Keira Leigh-Jones
- Antonia Prebble as Suzie Davidson, Jon's girlfriend
- Matt Whelan as Noah, Jon's friend
- Siobhan Marshall as Becca, Noah's partner
- Ben Mitchell as Motorcycle Cop
- Tom Sainsbury as Bongo
- Geraldine Brophy as Andy
- Rima Te Wiata as Mrs Davidson

with cameo appearances from Karl Burnett, Tim Shadbolt, Eric Young, Paul Henry and Simon Dallow

== Plot ==
Luke is chased by several people in a car dump yard in Kaikohe. He jumps into a working yellow Mini Cooper S and drives away. Meanwhile Jon, an Auckland-based writer who cannot finish his book, decides to visit a wedding in Wellington that Suzie, his ex-fiancée, is invited to. He steals his friend's expensive suit and drives south. In Pōkeno, his car breaks down and catches fire, so Jon continues his trip by foot. He is almost run over by Luke on a rural road, and Luke agrees to give Jon a lift. In Waikato, they accidentally drive off a petrol station without paying, which attracts the attention of the police. Luke escapes the police officer due to his incredible driving skill.

They get to a drive-through burger restaurant, where Keira, an employee who is fed up with customers' rudeness, joins them on a whim. Keira is a vegan activist. She wants to get to Wellington to participate in a protest against live export and a pre-event rave.

Jon comes to the wedding and bitterly confronts Suzie about the man who is consoling her, to which she responds by spilling champagne onto him. Jon, visibly upset, goes to the rave where he discovers that his laptop with the book draft is completely broken. He takes drugs that Keira's friends supply him with and falls asleep in the coffin that is attached to the Mini to be used in the protest. In the morning, the police start chasing their car again through the Lambton Quay part of Wellington city, and, thanks to Luke's driving skill, they manage to escape by driving into an open freight train car in the Wellington train station. Noah calls Jon and tells him that the man at the wedding is Suzie's gay friend.

On the train after travelling across the Cook Strait the travellers discover a lot of old clothing amongst blondini memorabilia (throwback to the original movie “the great blondini”) that they put on, including the titular pork pie hat. Keira and Luke start a relationship and have sex. Jon decides to go to Suzie's house in Invercargill to talk to her. Unbeknownst to the others, Keira records a video where she says that they are animal rights activists going to Invercargill. They drive the mini off the train at Glenmark trainstation, Waipara, North Canterbury and drive through the Mackenzie country stopping briefly in Tekapo.

In [Omarama], Jon goes to a dairy to buy some snacks and discovers that their "gang" is now in the national news due to Keira's announcements. Dairy worker approvingly points to the news report, and Jon runs away. Keira thinks that going viral is great for their cause, but Luke and Jon argue that the police will capture them because of that. They travel SH85 down the Waitaki valley to get to Naseby (probably using Danseys Pass)

Keira leaves the car when they get to Naseby and is captured by the police.

Luke and Jon hide the car under a bridge and spend the night there after eluding police through the Maniototo back roads avoiding the main roads. Jon hears Becca on the radio where she says that Jon didn't show up at his wedding with Suzie, to the approving remarks of the radio host. Luke commits to helping him to get to Invercargil, but the whole area is being barricaded by the police. Luke drives to Roxburgh and is stunned to see crowds of fans waiving at them. On the road away from the town, they meet Bongo, a conspiracy theorist fan who offers them help. They accept because they are low on petrol, but drive away when he shows with a gun and demands to be included into the team. He accidentally shoots himself in the foot, then walks to the emergency clinic and claims that the "gang" shot him. Armed police units are deployed, and the news start disseminating the rumour about Luke and Jon having guns.

Keira uploads a video from detention where she claims that the "gang" are unarmed. Luke goes to a dairy and is shot by an aggressive and scared police officer. Jon continues his trip alone. He calls Suzie, and she agrees to give him one last chance: he has to show up at the café in Invercargil at 7 pm. The Southland Mini Club are moved by Jon's story and help him shake off most of the police cars, although one of the officers shoots his tyres, so the car catches fire from friction of the wheel against the asphalt. Jon makes it into Invercargill almost late, but catches Suzie as she walks away from the café. He is arrested, but she decides to become his lawyer.

In the mid-credits scene it is revealed that Suzie and Jon decided to marry again, and Suzie left him waiting at the altar for several hours. Keira stole Luke, who used a wheelchair, from a hospital, and they ran away from the police.

== Production ==
The original Goodbye Pork Pie is a low budget feature film directed by Matt Murphy's father Geoff, and written by Geoff Murphy and Ian Mune. In 2014, a remake was announced, to be directed by Matt Murphy, who was part of the crew on the original 1981 version. The same year, Matt Murphy directed a reenactment of the Lake Hāwea chase from the first film, as an advertisement for the New Mini.

Filming of Pork Pie (A.k.a. Joyride) started in March 2016. Dean O'Gorman, James Rolleston and Ashleigh Cummings were set to star as Jon (John), Luke (Gerry) and Keira (Shirl) respectively. The film's first trailer was released on 17 October 2016.

== Reception ==
=== Box office ===
Pork Pie was released in New Zealand on Thursday, 2 February 2017, and Australia on Wednesday, 5 April 2017, where opening weekend earnings totaled US$204,839 and US$8,715 respectively. The film ultimately grossed US$788,924 in the home market and US$58,383 in Australia, for total box office of US$797,639 worldwide.

=== Critical response ===
==== New Zealand critics ====
Local reviews were mixed. Steve Newall of Flicks.co.nz awarded the film 3 stars out of 5, writing "Pork Pie is probably not as bad as you think it's going to be," and adding "It’s just so depressingly familiar though, driven by predictable plotting, well-worn tropes and unenthusing character arcs. And while Pork Pie whacks in a few “fucks” and tokes of weed, it's devoid of the freewheeling anarchic sensibility it is theoretically channeling." Graeme Tuckett of Stuff.co.nz writes the film is "an update that lacks the original's spice." And the New Zealand Herald's review awards the film 2.5 stars out of 5, and states "Any hope that the remake of Goodbye Pork Pie could recapture the ol' yellow magic of the original evaporates fairly early on," while concluding with "Higher performance car, lower performance remake." Sarah Watt, also from stuff.co.nz, describes the film as "a joyous adventure", and Dana Tetenburg from Tearaway Magazine describes the film as "an eccentric adventure with its nature based in the journey rather than the destination. I laughed for the majority of the first half, and cried through the majority of the second, which in my books is a sign of a great film".

==== Overseas critics ====
International reviews of the film to date have been positive. On Rotten Tomatoes the film has an approval rating of 100% based on reviews from 10 critics.

Eddie Cockrell from Variety describes it as a "sleek, kinetic and eye-catching retooling of the 1981 film", with a story "cleverly updated by writer-director Matt Murphy", and "crucially, the casual misogyny of the 1981 release has been replaced by an unforced social conscience".

Writing in The Sydney Morning Herald, Paul Byrnes described the film as "more fun than a barrel of monkeys"; and Alison Lesley from Access Reel writes, "The film is so enjoyable in its absurdity that it’s near impossible to fault". She reviewed the film 9/10 and writes “this is a film that refused to be pinned down by a single genre, and is simultaneously moving, hilarious, and gripping as it ups the stakes constantly, to an epic and explosive end”.

The film was apparently well received at the 2017 Cannes Film Festival but won no prizes.
