= Heaven (1998 film) =

- Directed by: Scott Reynolds
- Written by: Scott Reynolds
- Based on: Heaven by Chad Taylor
- Produced by: Sue Rogers; Bob Weinstein; Harvey Weinstein
- Starring: Martin Donovan; Daniel Edwards; Joanna Going
- Cinematography: Simon Raby
- Edited by: Wayne Cook
- Music by: Victoria Kelly
- Production company: Midnight Film Productions
- Distributed by: Miramax Films
- Release dates: September 1, 1998 (Montréal Film Festival); April 30, 1999 (United States)
- Running time: 104 minutes
- Countries: New Zealand; United States
- Language: English

Heaven is a 1998 New Zealand-American psychological thriller film written and directed by Scott Reynolds. The story is based on the 1994 novel of the same name by Chad Taylor.

The film stars Martin Donovan as a struggling architect entangled in a web of divorce, gambling addiction, and clairvoyant visions. It was produced by New Zealand-based Midnight Film Productions, with substantial funding from U.S. studio Miramax Films. Filming occurred in Auckland, New Zealand, using a mix of American actors and local actors.

== Plot ==
Robert Marling (Martin Donovan), a down-on-his-luck architect and gambling addict, is in the midst of a bitter divorce from his wife Jennifer (Joanna Going), who is seeking full custody of their young son (Michael Langley). Jennifer is secretly involved in an affair with Dr. Melrose (Patrick Malahide), a psychologist. Robert's addictions lead him to accumulate debts at a strip club owned by his friend Stanner (Richard Schiff).

While at the club, Robert encounters Heaven (Daniel Edwards), a transgender dancer with clairvoyant abilities who experiences violent visions of the future. Heaven, who is also a patient of Dr. Melrose, shares a premonition with Robert that helps him win at cards, drawing them closer. As Heaven's visions intensify, revealing dark and violent events involving Robert, the story unfolds in a fragmented, non-linear fashion, blending elements of thriller, gore, and psychological drama. Dr. Melrose begins exploiting Heaven's abilities for personal gain, leading to a climactic confrontation.

== Cast ==
- Martin Donovan as Robert Marling
- Daniel Edwards as Heaven
- Joanna Going as Jennifer Marling
- Richard Schiff as Stanner
- Patrick Malahide as Dr. Melrose
- Karl Urban as Sweeper
- Michael Langley as Robert's son
- Jeremy Birchall as Flex
- Clint Sharplin as Raymond

== Production ==
Heaven was written and directed by Scott Reynolds in his second feature film, following his 1997 horror debut The Ugly. The film's style draws influences from neo-noir and directors like Quentin Tarantino, featuring a non-linear narrative, vivid visuals, and elements of violence.

American financier Miramax allowed Reynolds to shoot the film in New Zealand, making it a rare instance of a New Zealand director shooting a feature film on home soil with international backing. It was Miramax's second investment in a film from the South Pacific area, as in 1995 Miramax had contributed funding for the Australian film Cosi. Producer Midnight Film Productions are listed as the copyright holder in the credits, rather than Miramax Film Corporation, although Miramax have retained perpetual distribution rights to the film in North America.

Heaven was shot during 1997 in Auckland, New Zealand. American actress Joanna Going, who plays Jennifer Marling, had recently completed another Miramax project, the horror film Phantoms. This film was made in Colorado, and had extensive reshoots, which continued even after Heaven had wrapped production.

Around the production of Heaven, Miramax boss Harvey Weinstein explored producing another New Zealand film project, an adaptation of J.R.R. Tolkien's The Lord of the Rings directed by Peter Jackson. Development began around 1995, but tensions arose, and the project ultimately moved to New Line Cinema in 1998, where it was expanded into a trilogy filmed in New Zealand from 1999 to 2000.

== Release and reception ==
Heaven premiered at the Montréal Film Festival on September 1, 1998, followed by other Canadian screenings at the Toronto International Film Festival on September 17 and Cinefest Sudbury on September 25. It had a limited theatrical release in the United States on April 30, 1999, distributed by Miramax. Its U.S. release face some difficulties due to the gun violence featured in the film; the Columbine High School Shooting had occurred the same month as the film's U.S. release.

It garnered mixed reviews from critics, and holds a 60% approval rating on Rotten Tomatoes.

=== Home media ===
In the United States, Miramax Home Entertainment released the film on VHS and DVD on November 9, 1999. The film's New Zealand VHS release was distributed by the New Zealand-branch of Roadshow Entertainment, while the Australian VHS was distributed by Ronin Films.

In 2010, Miramax was sold by The Walt Disney Company (their owners since 1993), with the studio being taken over by private equity firm Filmyard Holdings that same year. Filmyard sublicensed the home video rights for several Miramax titles to Lionsgate, who reissued Heaven on DVD in the U.S. on April 15, 2014.

Filmyard Holdings sold Miramax to Qatari company beIN Media Group during March 2016. In April 2020, ViacomCBS (now known as Paramount Skydance) acquired the rights to Miramax's library, after buying a 49% stake in the studio from beIN. Heaven was one of the 700 titles Paramount acquired in the deal.
