= The Dead Lands =

2014 film

- Film poster
- Directed by: Toa Fraser
- Written by: Glenn Standring
- Produced by: Matthew Metcalfe; Glenn Standring
- Starring: James Rolleston; Lawrence Makoare; Te Kohe Tuhaka; Xavier Horan; George Henare; Raukura Turei; Rena Owen
- Cinematography: Leon Narbey
- Edited by: Dan Kircher
- Music by: Don McGlashan
- Production companies: GFC/Fightertown; XYZ Films; New Zealand Film Commission; New Zealand Film Production Fund Trust; Te Mangai Paho Images & Sound; Lipsync Productions; Day Tripper Films
- Distributed by: Transmission Films
- Release dates: 4 September 2014 (TIFF); 30 October 2014 (New Zealand)
- Running time: 108 minutes
- Country: New Zealand
- Language: Māori
- Box office: $906,158

The Dead Lands is a 2014 Māori-language New Zealander action film directed by Toa Fraser. It was number 1 at the New Zealand box office when it was released. It was screened in the Special Presentations section at the 2014 Toronto International Film Festival where it had its world premier on 4 September 2014. It was selected as the New Zealand entry for the Best Foreign Language Film at the 87th Academy Awards, but was not nominated.

== Plot ==
In Pre Colonial New Zealand Tane, a Māori chief, his 15-year-old son Hongi and their tribe allow a rival tribe access to the remains of the second tribe's fallen warriors. Hongi does not trust the rival tribe's leader, Wirepa, and follows him. As Hongi suspected, the visit is a ruse, and Wirepa desecrates the grave site as a pretext for war, blaming Hongi for disturbing the remains. Tane believes his son is innocent, but offers to kill Hongi if it will prevent war. Wirepa refuses, saying war is imminent. Wirepa's tribe returns later in force, kills the men of the tribe and beheads Tane, taking his head as a trophy. Hongi is knocked away from the battle, and survives.

Hongi leaves and attempts to track down Wirepa. On the way, he discovers that Wirepa and his men have entered the Dead Lands, an area where any who venture in are believed to be killed by a Taniwha. Hongi, suspecting that the monster is in fact a man, tracks him down and, although reluctant, the monster agrees to help Hongi hunt down Wirepa. The monster is in fact a warrior (who is never named in the film) who murdered all the men of his own tribe, and he kills anyone who ventures there to prevent his tribe's historic lands from being occupied. The warrior is motivated by a desire to redeem himself and thus be led to the afterlife by his vengeful ancestors.

While tracking down Wirepa, Hongi has a series of visions of his long dead grandmother, who helps them on their way. Hongi and the warrior track down Wirepa and kill several of his men before Wirepa flees with his surviving warriors. Hongi and the warrior go after them, and the warrior kills a small band of hunters they come across to keep his identity a secret. Hongi is devastated by this, and screams at the warrior who later explained that he killed his people because his father forced him to killed his wife and their child to maintained honor only realize that it was just part of the tribal politics. The two separate, but the warrior has a vision from his ancestors that convinces him to continue helping Hongi.

Wirepa and his men are tracked to a mountaintop fort, where they barricade themselves inside. Wirepa taunts Hongi with his fathers head, angering him, but the warrior convinces him to regroup and return later. Wirepa's men leave Tane's head on a spike, and most of the men leave the fort. Again, this is a ruse by Wirepa to lure Hongi in. However, when the trap is sprung, the warrior and Hongi get the upper hand and kill most of Wirepa's men. While Hongi battles Wirepa, the warrior is severely wounded but manages to return and save Hongi. Wirepa, distracted from his battle with Hongi, beats the warrior to the ground before returning his attention to Hongi. This time Hongi gains the upper hand, and is about to kill Wirepa. This pleases Wirepa, because it will allow him to be remembered as a great warrior who died in battle about whom songs will be sung, and stories will be told. Hongi denies Wirepa this honor, spares his life and makes him swear to leave his land, and allows him to leave. Defeated and alone, Wirepa walks off in shame.

Hongi returns to the warrior, who is mortally wounded. Hongi adopts the warrior into his tribe, so that his own ancestors will guide the warrior into the afterlife. The film ends with a final vision of Hongi's grandmother, who is very pleased, as Hongi begins his return home.

== Cast ==
- James Rolleston as Hongi
- Lawrence Makoare as The Warrior
- Rena Owen as the Grandmother
- Te Kohe Tuhaka as Wirepa
- Xavier Horan as Rangi
- Raukura Turei as Mehe
- George Henare as Tane
- Matariki Whatarau as Tama
- Mere Boynton as Turikatuku

== Reception ==
The film received mixed reviews. It has a 69% approval rating on Rotten Tomatoes based on 51 reviews, with an average rating of 6.1/10. The critics consensus reads: "The Dead Lands doesn't add anything new to the primeval quest genre, but its battle scenes boast enough visceral thrills to carry viewers through the more mundane moments." According to Metacritic, which sampled 14 critics and calculated an weighted average score of 59 out of 100, the film received "mixed or average reviews". Simon Abrams of RogerEbert.com gave the film 2 stars out of 4. Deborah Young of The Hollywood Reporter put it in her top ten films of the year.

== TV adaptation ==
In 2019, AMC Entertainment's streaming service Shudder and TVNZ said they would create a TV series based on the film. The first two episodes of The Dead Lands premiered on 23 January 2020 on Shudder's platforms followed by TVNZ shortly afterwards with later shown on both Shudder and TVNZ OnDemand. Decider called it an exciting and funny Ancient-Māori Riff on the Z-word Genre Locus Magazine saw it as a first-rate action adventure supernatural horror series. Siena Yates for the NZ Herald wrote, “The Dead Lands delivers all you’d want from a Hollywood supernatural action thriller but wraps it beautifully and carefully in Māori culture and myth to create something the likes of which I’ve never seen before.”

== Awards and nominations ==
Year	Award	Category	Work	Result	Ref.
2014	New Zealand Film & Television Awards	Best Film	The Dead Lands	Nominated	
2014	New Zealand Film & Television Awards	Best Director	Toa Fraser	Nominated	
2014	New Zealand Film & Television Awards	Best Actor	James Rolleston	Nominated	
2014	New Zealand Film & Television Awards	Best Supporting Actor	Lawrence Makoare	Nominated	
2014	New Zealand Film & Television Awards	Best Supporting Actress	Raukura Turei	Nominated	
2014	New Zealand Film & Television Awards	Best Screenplay	Glenn Standring	Nominated	
2014	New Zealand Film & Television Awards	Best Costume Design	Barbara Darragh	Won	
2014	New Zealand Film & Television Awards	Best Make-Up Design	Davina Lamont	Won	
2014	New Zealand Film & Television Awards	Best Visual Effects	George Zwier	Won	
2014	New Zealand Film & Television Awards	Best Sound	James Hayday, Lee Herrick, Sven Taits	Nominated	
2014	New Zealand Film & Television Awards	Best Score	Don McGlashan	Nominated	
2014	New Zealand Film & Television Awards	Best Editor	Dan Kircher	Nominated	
2014	New Zealand Film & Television Awards	Best Production Design	Grant Major	Nominated	
2014	New Zealand Film & Television Awards	Best Poster Design	Jeremy Saunders	Nominated	

== See also ==
- List of submissions to the 87th Academy Awards for Best Foreign Language Film
- List of New Zealand submissions for the Academy Award for Best Foreign Language Film
- The Dead Lands (television series)
