= Housebound (2014 film) =

- Directed by: Gerard Johnstone
- Written by: Gerard Johnstone
- Produced by: Luke Sharpe
- Starring: Morgana O'Reilly; Rima Te Wiata; Glen-Paul Waru
- Cinematography: Simon Riera
- Edited by: Gerard Johnstone
- Music by: Mahuia Bridgman-Cooper
- Production companies: New Zealand Film Commission; Semi-Professional Pictures
- Distributed by: XLrator Media
- Release date: 10 March 2014 (SXSW)
- Running time: 106 minutes
- Country: New Zealand
- Language: English
- Budget: US$400,000

Housebound is a 2014 New Zealand horror comedy film written, edited, and directed by Gerard Johnstone, in his feature film directorial debut. The film had its world premiere on 10 March 2014, at South by Southwest and stars Morgana O'Reilly as a woman sentenced to house arrest in a potentially haunted house.

== Plot ==
Kylie Bucknell, a troubled young woman, attempts to steal the safe from an ATM but she fails to escape and is arrested. Due to her history of recidivism, she is sentenced to house arrest for eight months under the care of her mother, Miriam. Kylie does not get along with either her mother or her step-father, Graeme. A security contractor, Amos, explains that Kylie's ankle monitor will alert the police if she ever leaves the premises of her mother's house.

Kylie is further frustrated when Miriam claims the house is haunted. After a disembodied hand grabs her in the basement, Kylie becomes convinced that an intruder is in the house. Hearing noises upstairs, she launches an attack on a male figure that turns out to be Amos responding to an ankle monitor breach. Amos takes Miriam's suggestion of a haunting seriously, and promises to return with ghost hunting equipment. After a series of unexplained experiences, Kylie comes to believe there may truly be a ghost in the house. Dennis, Kylie's clinical psychologist, becomes concerned with what he believes to be delusions in Miriam and Kylie. Graeme reveals that their home was once a halfway house and the site of a horrific murder. They discover evidence of the crime, including a partial denture.

When Kylie and Amos discover that her neighbour uses a denture, Kylie breaks into the man's house and she attempts to take his denture. After she flees back home and hides in the basement, she panics and accidentally stabs Graeme. Amos attempts to break into her neighbour's house next but the neighbour says that he is not the killer. He tells the story of a young savant, Eugene, whom he adopted. Eugene is an expert at mechanics and electronics, and disappeared a year before the killing, though the neighbour believes him to be responsible.

Kylie discovers Eugene's secret hallways in their house and comes face to face with Eugene. After narrowly escaping, Kylie converges with Amos at the police station, and Amos corroborates her wild stories of a serial killer living in the hidden passageways. However, the police find no evidence, and Dennis convinces all involved that it would be best if Kylie were institutionalised. Once Dennis reveals that he wears a partial denture, Kylie becomes suspicious of him. When she confronts him with evidence that he was an intern at the halfway house, he attempts to kill Miriam and Kylie, while incapacitating Amos. Kylie and Miriam flee into the secret tunnels, where they encounter Eugene.

Realising that their paranormal activity has been Eugene all this time, they are at first frightened but realise that he is friendly. Dennis stabs Eugene, knocks out Kylie, and begins to strangle Miriam. Eugene wakes Kylie and hands her a weapon, which she uses to stab Dennis. Eugene throws a switch, and high voltage explodes Dennis' head. Months later, all have recovered, Amos removes Kylie's ankle monitor, and Eugene has seemingly become an accepted (albeit mostly unseen) member of the household.

== Cast ==
- Morgana O'Reilly as Kylie Bucknell
- Rima Te Wiata as Miriam Bucknell
- Glen-Paul Waru as Amos
- Cameron Rhodes as Dennis
- Ross Harper as Graeme
- Ryan Lampp as Eugene
- Mick Innes as Mads Kraglund
- Bruce Hopkins as Officer Carson
- Millen Baird as Officer Grayson
- Wallace Chapman as Mr. Hollis
- Nikki Si’ulepa as Leslie
- Ian Mune as Judge

== Production ==
Johnstone was first inspired to create a horror film after watching Ghosthunters on television and received additional inspiration from classic films such as The Changeling and The Legend of Hell House. While writing the script Johnstone wanted the character of Kylie to be "someone that wouldn't scare easily. That way, when she does finally fall victim to fear, it's much more palpable." He experienced some difficulty in achieving the film's exterior shots of the house, as budgetary issues limited their options of homes and renovations to the exterior of their chosen house during the course of filming also raised some issues.

== Release ==
Housebound had its world premiere at the South by Southwest film festival on 11 March 2014.

== Reception ==
Rotten Tomatoes, a review aggregator, reports that 95% of 43 surveyed critics gave the film a positive review; the average rating is 7.4/10. The site's consensus reads: "Alternately hilarious, gross, and simply diverting, Housebound is the rare horror-comedy that delivers on both fronts." Metacritic rated it 76/100 based on 10 reviews.

Hitfix gave it an A and wrote "sometimes at the festival you walk into a room knowing nothing, sit down, and get your skull punched in by a movie that is calibrated perfectly, that knows exactly what it wants to do, and that seems almost unnaturally confident considering it was made by a first-time feature director". Fangoria praised the film, rating it at 3 out of 4 stars and stating that it "neatly carries some universal ideas about throwing away childish indignation and rebellion, and getting to know your parents as people with pasts and personal lives, not just nagging overseers." Shock Till You Drop also gave Housebound a positive rating, as they considered it one of the highlights of South by Southwest. Movies.com said it was a breath of fresh air for the often stale haunted-house genre. Badass Digest told readers they had "a new favorite horror film of 2014". Chuck Bowen of Slant Magazine rated it 2.5/4 stars and wrote that each of the film's elements are "competently and engagingly orchestrated" but do not combine into a coherent whole.

== Awards and nominations ==
| Year | Award | Category | Work | Result | Ref. |
|---|---|---|---|---|---|
| 2014 | Fright Meter Awards | Best Supporting Actress | Rima Te Wiata | Won | |
| 2014 | Fright Meter Awards | Best Horror Movie | Housebound | Nominated | |
| 2014 | Fright Meter Awards | Best Director | Gerard Johnstone | Nominated | |
| 2014 | Fright Meter Awards | Best Actress | Morgana O'Reilly | Nominated | |
| 2014 | Fright Meter Awards | Best Screenplay | Gerard Johnstone | Nominated | |
| 2014 | Fright Meter Awards | Best Editing | Gerard Johnstone | Nominated | |
| 2014 | Dead by Dawn | Best Feature Film | Housebound | Won | |
| 2014 | Neuchâtel International Fantastic Film Festival | Best Feature Film | Housebound | Won | |
| 2014 | New Zealand Film & Television Awards | Best Actress | Morgana O'Reilly | Nominated | |
| 2014 | New Zealand Film & Television Awards | Best Supporting Actress | Rima Te Wiata | Nominated | |
| 2014 | New Zealand Film & Television Awards | Best Director | Gerard Johnstone | Nominated | |
| 2014 | New Zealand Film & Television Awards | Best Make-Up | Jacinta Driver | Nominated | |
| 2014 | New Zealand Film & Television Awards | Best Costume Design | Lissy Mayer | Nominated | |
| 2014 | New Zealand Film & Television Awards | Best Film | Housebound | Nominated | |
| 2014 | New Zealand Film & Television Awards | Best Visual Effects | Matt Westbrooke | Nominated | |
| 2014 | New Zealand Film & Television Awards | Best Production Design | Jane Bucknell | Nominated | |
| 2014 | New Zealand Film & Television Awards | Best Cinematography | Simon Riera | Nominated | |
| 2014 | New Zealand Film & Television Awards | Best Sound | Franklin Road Sound Post Production | Nominated | |
| 2014 | New Zealand Film & Television Awards | Best Poster Design | Johnny Lyon | Won | |
| 2014 | Strasbourg European Fantastic Film Festival | Audience Award | Housebound | Won | |
| 2014 | Toronto After Dark Film Festival | Best Horror Film | Housebound | Won | |
| 2014 | Toronto After Dark Film Festival | Best Comedy Film | | Won | |
| 2014 | Toronto After Dark Film Festival | Best Ensemble Cast | | Won | |
| 2015 | Fangoria Chainsaw Awards | Best Limited Release Film | Housebound | Nominated | |
| 2015 | Fangoria Chainsaw Awards | Best Screenplay | Gerard Johnstone | Nominated | |
| 2015 | Fangoria Chainsaw Awards | Best Supporting Actress | Rima Te Wiata | Nominated | |

== Remake ==
In February 2015, New Line Cinema announced the production of a US remake. Original writer and director Gerard Johnstone is set with Dave Neustadter and Walter Hamada as executive producer for New Line.
