= Everything We Loved =

- Directed by: Max Currie
- Written by: Max Currie
- Screenplay by: Max Currie
- Produced by: Tom Hern
- Starring: Sia Trokenheim; Brett Stewart; Ben Clarkson
- Cinematography: Dave Garbett
- Edited by: Dan Kircher
- Music by: Tim Prebble
- Distributed by: Four Knights Film
- Release date: 31 July 2014 (New Zealand)
- Running time: 101 min
- Country: New Zealand
- Language: English

Everything We Loved is a 2014 New Zealand drama film written and directed by Max Currie. It won Best Actress and Best Screenplay at the 2014 New Zealand Film Awards.

== Cast ==
- Brett Stewart ... Charlie Shepherd
- Sia Trokenheim ... Angela Shepherd
- Ben Clarkson ... Tommy Burroughs
- Patrick Garbett ... Hugo
- Jodie Rimmer ... Jane
- Simon Dallow ... Newsreader

== Awards ==
Year	Award	Category	Work	Result	Ref.
2014	2014 New Zealand Film Awards	Best Actress	Sia Trokenheim	Won	
2014	2014 New Zealand Film Awards	Best Cinematography	Dave Garbett	Won	
2014	2014 New Zealand Film Awards	Best Director	Max Currie	Nominated	
2014	2014 New Zealand Film Awards	Best Film	Everything We Loved	Nominated	
2014	2014 New Zealand Film Awards	Best Screenplay	Max Currie	Nominated	
2014	2014 New Zealand Film Awards	Best Editing	Dan Kircher	Nominated	
2015	Victoria TX Indie Film Fest	Best Director	Max Currie	Won	
