= James Rolleston =

New Zealand actor (born 1997)

- Born: 8 June 1997 (age 29); New Zealand
- Education: Ōpōtiki College
- Occupation: Actor
- Years active: 2010–present
- Notable work: Boy; The Dark Horse; The Dead Lands; Pork Pie; The Breaker Upperers

James Rolleston (born 8 June 1997) is a New Zealand actor known for the films Boy and The Dark Horse. The latter was released in October 2014 and had its world premiere at the 2014 Toronto International Film Festival on 4 September.

== Film career ==
Rolleston made his screen debut in the Taika Waititi film Boy, playing the main role of the child who idolises his father. Boy became the most successful local film released in New Zealand to date. In 2014 he took roles in two further films: critically acclaimed drama The Dark Horse, in which he co-starred opposite Cliff Curtis as a teenager who is set to be initiated into a gang, and action movie The Dead Lands, in which he plays a young Māori warrior seeking vengeance for the massacre of his family. Rolleston also starred in Pork Pie, the 2017 remake of the New Zealand classic Goodbye Pork Pie.

Rolleston has frequently appeared in Vodafone New Zealand television commercials.

=== Filmography ===
| Year | Film | Role | Notes |
|---|---|---|---|
| 2010 | Boy | Alamein ("Boy") | |
| 2010 | Frosty Man and the BMX Kid | BMX Kid | Short film |
| 2014 | Man | Eli | Short film |
| 2014 | The Dark Horse | Mana | |
| 2014 | The Dead Lands | Hongi | |
| 2016 | The Rehearsal | Stanley | |
| 2016 | Amua | Teina | Short film |
| 2017 | Pork Pie | Luke | |
| 2018 | The Breaker Upperers | Jordan | |
| 2022 | Whina | Gabriel | |
| 2023 | Uproar | Jamie Waaka | |

== Personal life ==
Rolleston is from Ōpōtiki.

On 26 July 2016, Rolleston was charged with dangerous driving while driving with close friend Kaleb Maxwell, when the vehicle they were in crashed into a bridge in Ōpōtiki. Rolleston was seriously injured in the crash with injuries to his lower body and brain. In November, 2016, he made his first public appearance, presenting the Supreme Award at the Attitude Awards. He has spoken about his ongoing recovery, revealing he required rehabilitation to learn how to walk, speak, and use basic motor skills again.

== See also ==
- Cinema of New Zealand
- List of New Zealand actors
