= Boy (2010 film) =

2010 film by Taika Waititi

- New Zealand theatrical release poster
- Directed by: Taika Waititi
- Written by: Taika Waititi
- Produced by: Cliff Curtis; Ainsley Gardiner; Emanuel Michael
- Starring: James Rolleston; Te Aho Eketone-Whitu; Taika Waititi
- Cinematography: Adam Clark
- Edited by: Chris Plummer
- Music by: Samuel Scott; Conrad Wedde; Luke Buda
- Production companies: Whenua Films; Unison Films; New Zealand Film Production Fund; New Zealand Film Commission; New Zealand On Air; Te Mangai Paho
- Distributed by: Transmission Films; Madman Entertainment; Kino Lorber
- Release date: 25 March 2010
- Running time: 88 minutes
- Country: New Zealand
- Languages: English; Māori
- Box office: $8.6 million

Boy is a 2010 New Zealand comedy-drama film, written and directed by Taika Waititi. The film stars James Rolleston, Te Aho Aho Eketone-Whitu, and Waititi. It is produced by Cliff Curtis, Ainsley Gardiner and Emanuel Michael and financed by the New Zealand Film Commission. Taika Waititi recognised the self-reflective aspect of Boy, claiming that he was "playing my dad" as well as the claim that Boy is a "mirror of me", bringing a particularly personal feel to the film in relation to its director. In New Zealand, the film eclipsed previous records for a first week's box office takings for local production. Boy went on to become the highest-grossing New Zealand film at the local box office. The soundtrack to Boy features New Zealand artists such as The Phoenix Foundation, who previously provided music for Waititi's film Eagle vs Shark.

== Plot ==
In 1984, Boy is living in Waihau Bay, in the Tairawhiti region of New Zealand, on a small farm with his grandmother, younger brother Rocky, and several cousins. Boy spends his time dreaming of Michael Jackson, hanging out with his friends Dallas and Dynasty, trying to impress Chardonnay (a girl at his school), talking to his pet goat, and making up wild stories about his absent father, Alamein. Rocky, meanwhile, is a quiet, odd child, who believes he has dangerous superpowers because his mother died giving birth to him. One day, Rocky's grandmother leaves for a funeral in Wellington, leaving Boy in charge of the house and taking care of the other children. Boy is then surprised to see his father and two other men arrive at the farm.

Boy is overjoyed to see Alamein return, thinking that he has come to take the boys away to live with him, but Rocky is uncertain about their father's sudden reappearance. It seems at first that Alamein has finally come back to be in his sons' lives, but it is soon revealed that he is actually there to find a bag of money that he had buried on the farm before being incarcerated for robbery. Alamein and his friends begins digging up a field, searching for the money. Boy sees this and offers to help, thinking Alamein is digging for treasure, and Alamein soon decides to hang out with Boy and be a father, cutting Boy's hair and confronting his bullies. Boy brings Alamein marijuana to sell from a crop grown by Dallas and Dynasty's father, a member of a local gang.

Boy begins to see himself as an adult, growing distant from his friends. Alamein, unable to find the money, becomes frustrated and leaves town again, leaving Boy and Rocky behind. Boy continues to dig for the money alone before eventually finding it. Boy hides the moneybag in his goat's pen, then takes his father's jacket and proudly treats his friends to ice blocks and lollies. Alamein returns and hits Boy for stealing his jacket while angrily questioning him about where he found the money for the ice blocks, leaving Boy humiliated. Alamein later apologises, telling his son for the first time that he loves him and confesses he struggles with controlling his anger. Boy goes to retrieve the moneybag afterwards only to find that it has been eaten by his goat.

Alamein and Rocky continue to dig for the hidden money. Boy decides to make up for losing the money by leading Alamein to the marijuana crop owned by Dallas and Dynasty's father, and Alamein gathers the entire crop. Later, Alamein takes his gang out to celebrate at the local pub. Another car then drives up, and the local gang gets out. The gang approaches Alamein and his friends, confronting them over stealing their marijuana before beating them severely. While driving home, Alamein accidentally hits and kills Boy's goat.

The next day, Alamein is abandoned by his men, who steal the marijuana and the car. Enraged, Alamein trashes the house. Meanwhile, Boy visits his mother's grave, drinking alcohol and smoking marijuana, and finally comes to terms with the fact that all of his happy, early memories of his father are make-believe, and Alamein was in fact not even there when Rocky was born. Meanwhile, Alamein sits in the barn, depressed that he has been unable to find his money. Rocky comes up to him and apologizes for killing his mother when he was born. Just then, Boy comes in and scatters the remains of the eaten money at Alamein's feet. He confronts Alamein about his absence in his life before telling him that they are nothing alike. The next morning, the children clean up the house, their grandmother returns home, and Alamein is gone. Boy tells Rocky that Alamein has gone to Japan to train as a samurai. He reconnects with his friends and apologises to Dynasty, then goes with Rocky to visit their mother's grave. The boys find Alamein sitting there and quietly join him, before Rocky asks, "How was Japan?"

The film ends with a mid-credits sequence of all the major characters dancing in a routine that is a mixture of haka and Michael Jackson's Thriller.

== Cast ==
- James Rolleston as Boy, a Māori kid who is a huge fan of Michael Jackson. Boy dreams of becoming rich and going to the city with his father, brother, and his pet goat. His real name is Alamein, like his father.
- Te Aho Aho Eketone-Whitu as Rocky, Boy's shy younger brother who believes he has superpowers.
- Taika Waititi as Alamein, Boy and Rocky's father; an ex-convict and former national serviceman who wants to be the leader of a biker gang, and comes back to Waihau Bay to find his buried money.
- Moerangi Tihore as Dynasty, Dallas' sister and one of Boy's best friends. She is the daughter of a biker and seems to have feelings for Boy.
- Cherilee Martin as Kelly, Boy's same-age cousin, who lives with him in the same house, with her three younger siblings.
- RickyLee Waipuka-Russell as Chardonnay, a teenage girl that Boy has a crush on, and who totally ignores him.
- Haze Reweti as Dallas, one of Boy's best friends.
- Maakariini Butler as Murray, one of Boy's friends from school.
- Rajvinder Eria as Tane, Boy's Indian friend, who is always alongside Murray and Dallas.
- Manihera Rangiuaia as Kingi, a school bully who often bullies Boy. He wears a Michael Jackson "Thriller" jacket.
- Darcy Ray Flavell-Hudson as Holden, Kingi's older brother, who also bullies Boy but comes to fear Boy's father Alamein and comes to admire him.
- Rachel House as Aunty Gracey, the sister of Boy's deceased mother, who owns a store in front of the sea.
- Waihoroi Shortland as Weirdo, a strange man who lives near the bridge, and appears to always be looking for something. He seems to be childish and inoffensive.
- Cohen Holloway as Chuppa, a friend of Alamein, who is an ex-convict and very foolish, along with Juju.
- Pana Hema Taylor as Juju, the other of Alamein's friends. Like Chuppa, he is always getting himself in trouble alongside the kids.
- Craig Hall as Mr. Langston, the Pākehā school principal, who studied with Boy's parents.
- Mavis Paenga as Nan, Boy's grandmother and Alamein's mother. She travels to a funeral for two weeks, leaving Boy in charge.

== Production ==
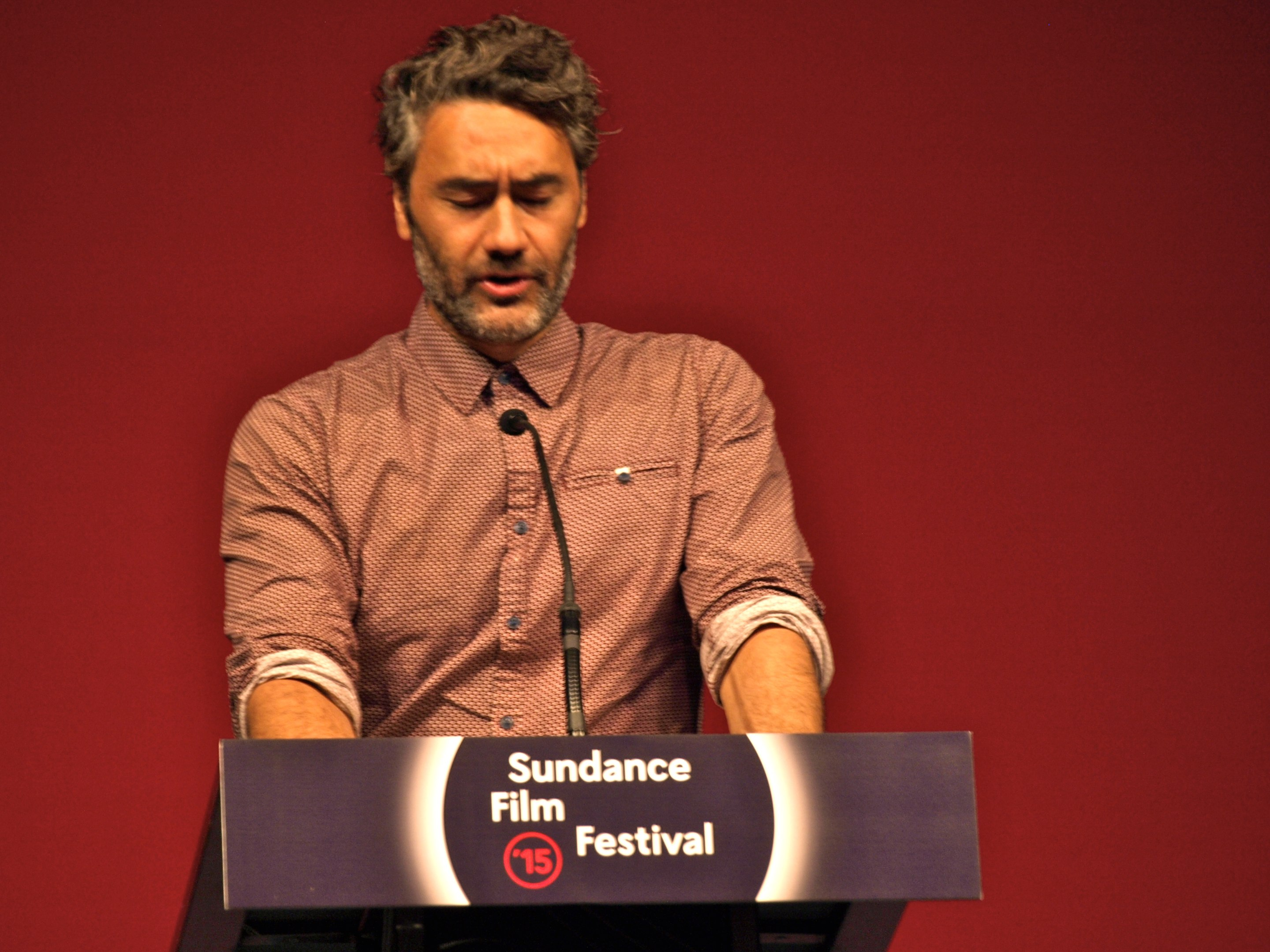
Director, actor and writer Taika Waititi

Waititi started developing Boy soon after finishing the short film Two Cars, One Night, and it first emerged as a film called Choice. The project was accepted into the Sundance Writer's Lab in 2005, where Waititi workshopped it with script writers Frank Pierson, Susan Shilliday, David Benioff and Naomi Foner Gyllenhaal. Instead of making Boy his first film as a director, Waititi went on to make oddball romance Eagle vs Shark, and continued to develop the screenplay over the next three years.

Once the script was finally ready, there was a small window of opportunity in which to make it. Waititi dropped the title Choice because he felt it would not translate to international audiences, and the film was retitled The Volcano. "It was a big pain about this kid's potential to be bigger than he is or just blooms or explode," said Waititi. "So it was a character in the script as well. When we were shooting the film it was still called Volcano and during the editing. We ended up cutting a lot of the stuff out."

Waititi wanted to shoot the film in the place where he partly grew up, Waihau Bay. The story was set in summer, but it was challenging to shoot in the height of summer due to the area's popularity as a fishing and holiday destination. The film features fields of maize, which is harvested starting in late April. James Rolleston was not initially cast in the lead role of Boy. Another actor was already in place when Rolleston turned up for a costume fitting as an extra. Waititi gave him an audition and after reviewing the film clips, Rolleston was offered the role two days before shooting began.

Waititi raised $110,000 via the crowdfunding website Kickstarter to distribute the film in the United States. At the time, this was the most prominent example of crowdfunding in New Zealand.

== Soundtrack ==
Boy

Soundtrack album by various artists
- Released: 2010
- Recorded: 2010
- Genre: Soundtrack
- Length: 67:49
- Labels: The Volcano Company Ltd and Franklin Rd
- Producer: Lee Prebble

The Phoenix Foundation film scores chronology
Eagle vs Shark (2007)	Boy (2010)

- Hine e Hine – The Phoenix Foundation
- Poi E – Pātea Māori Club
- Pass the Dutchie – Musical Youth
- One Million Rainbows – The Phoenix Foundation
- French Letter – Herbs
- Dragons & Demons – Herbs
- Forget It – The Phoenix Foundation
- Aku Raukura (Disco Mix) – Pātea Māori Club
- Out on the Street – Alastair Riddell
- Hine e Hine – St Josephs Maori Girls Choir
- Here We Are – The Phoenix Foundation
- Paki-o-Matariki – The Ratana Senior Concert Party
- Mum – Prince Tui Teka
- E Te Atua – St Josephs Maori Girls Choir
- Karu – Prince Tui Teka
- Flock of Hearts – The Phoenix Foundation

== Release ==
Boy premiered at the 2010 Sundance Film Festival on 22 January 2010 and competed in the "World Cinema – Dramatic" category. It was theatrically released on 25 March 2010 in New Zealand, and screened at the Antipodean Film Festival in Saint Tropez, France, in October 2010.

The film was released on DVD and Blu-ray in 2011 by Paramount Home Media Distribution.

== Reception ==
=== Critical response ===
Based on 74 reviews collected by Rotten Tomatoes, the film has an overall approval rating from critics of 88%, with an average score of 7.3/10. Its critics consensus reads, "Boy possesses the offbeat charm associated with New Zealand film but is also fully capable of drawing the viewer in emotionally." On metacritic it has a score of 70% out of 19 reviews indicating “generally favourable reviews”. Peter Calder of The New Zealand Herald gave the film five out of five stars. He praised the performances of the three main actors and said "it's hard to praise too highly the pitch-perfect tone of this movie."

The film critic Clarisse Loughrey has identified it as her favourite film, along with The Apartment.

=== Box office ===
On release in New Zealand, the film topped the box office receipts for the week, earning more on its opening day than any previous New Zealand film. The film grossed nearly $900,000 in its first seven days, beating Alice in Wonderland and homegrown pictures Whale Rider and The World's Fastest Indian. It also climbed above international animated-fantasy hit How to Train Your Dragon and mythical action flick Clash of the Titans. Boy became the highest grossing New Zealand film to date in the country, surpassing The World's Fastest Indian which held the position for five years.

=== Awards ===
Awarding Body	Category	Subcategory		Outcome
Asia Pacific Screen Award		Best Children's Feature Film	Ainsley Gardiner, Cliff Curtis, Emanuel Michael and Merata Mita	Nominated
AFI Fest Audience Award		Best International Feature Film	Taika Waititi	Won
Berlin International Film Festival	Deutsches Kinderhilfswerk Grand Prix	Best Feature Film	Taika Waititi	Won
Melbourne International Film Festival		Most Popular Feature Film	Taika Waititi	Won
Sundance Film Festival	Grand Jury Prize	World Cinema – Dramatic	Taika Waititi	Nominated
Sydney Film Festival	Audience Award	Best Feature Film	Taika Waititi	Won
ImagineNative Film + Media Arts Festival	Jury Award	Best Dramatic Feature	Taika Waititi	Won
Taipei Film Festival	International New Talent Competition	Grand Prize	Taika Waititi	Nominated
Taipei Film Festival	International New Talent Competition	Special Mention	Taika Waititi	Won
New Zealand Film and TV Awards	Film Award	Best Director in a Film Feature	Taika Waititi	Won
New Zealand Film and TV Awards	Film Award	Best Supporting Actor in a Feature Film	Taika Waititi	Won
New Zealand Film and TV Awards	Film Award	Best Screenplay for a Feature Film	Taika Waititi	Won
New Zealand Film and TV Awards	Film Award	Best Feature Film	Ainsley Gardiner	Won
New Zealand Film and TV Awards	Film Award	Best Lead Actor in a Feature Film	James Rolleston	Nominated
New Zealand Film and TV Awards	Film Award	Best Cinematography in a Feature Film	Adam Clark	Won
New Zealand Film and TV Awards	Film Award	Best Sound Design in a Feature Film	Ken Saville, Tim Prebble, Chris Todd, Michael Hedges and Gilbert Lake	Nominated
New Zealand Film and TV Awards	Film Award	Best Supporting Actor in a Feature Film	Te Aho Eketone-Whitu	Nominated
New Zealand Film and TV Awards	Film Award	Best Make-Up Design in a Feature Film	Dannelle Satherley	Nominated
New Zealand Film and TV Awards	Film Award	Best Production Design in a Feature Film	Shayne Radford	Nominated
New Zealand Film and TV Awards	Film Award	Best Costume Design in a Feature Film	Amanda Neale	Nominated
New Zealand Film and TV Awards	Film Award	Best Editing in a Feature Film	Chris Plummer	Won
New Zealand Film and TV Awards	Film Award	Best Score	Lukasz Pawel, Buda, Samuel Scott and Conrad Wedde	Won

== Notes ==
1. International television and home media distribution is handled by Kino Lorber.
