= The Bad Seed (TV series) =

New Zealand television series

- Genre: Crime; Family; Thriller
- Based on: The Night Book; Soon by Charlotte Grimshaw
- Written by: Sarah Kate-Lynch; Joss King; Michael Beran
- Directed by: Helena Brooks; Caroline Bell-Booth; Mike Smith
- Starring: Matt Minto; Dean O'Gorman; Madeleine Sami; Jodie Hillock; Xavier Horan; Chelsie Preston Crayford
- Composer: Karl Steven
- Country of origin: New Zealand
- Original language: English
- No. of series: 1
- No. of episodes: 5

Production
- Executive producers: Kelly Martin; Chris Bailey
- Producer: Robin Scholes
- Production location: Auckland
- Cinematography: Dave Garbett
- Editors: Eric De Beus; Vito Nicholas
- Running time: 42 mins. approx
- Production companies: South Pacific Pictures; Jump Film & TV

Original release
- Network: TVNZ 1
- Release: 14 April – 18 April 2019

The Bad Seed is a five-part New Zealand television crime drama series, based on the best selling novels The Night Book and Soon by Charlotte Grimshaw, that broadcast across five consecutive nights on TVNZ 1 from 14 April 2019. Starring Matt Minto and Dean O'Gorman in the leading roles, The Bad Seed follows the Lampton family, whose quiet suburban lifestyle is rocked by the murder of one of their neighbours, wealthy businessman's wife Julia Stevens. Also featured amongst the cast are Madeleine Sami, Jodie Hillock, Xavier Horan and Chelsie Preston Crayford.

Casting for the series was announced in April 2018, with filming commencing shortly after. The series' screenplay was co-written by Sarah-Kate Lynch, Joss King and Michael Beran, with Helena Brooks, Caroline Bell-Booth and Mike Smith serving as directors. Outside of New Zealand, the series premiered in the United Kingdom on Alibi on 14 May 2019, with episodes airing weekly at 9:00pm on Tuesdays.

== Plot ==
From outside the gates of their Remuera home, the Lampton family appears wealthy. The family consists of Simon (Matt Minto), an obstetrician; Karen (Jodie Hillock), his wife; and Elke (Madeleine McCarthy) and Claire (Zoe Jansson Bush), their two teenage daughters. The home also accommodates Simon's less wealthy older brother Ford (Dean O'Gorman), who is staying with the family temporarily. Despite their lifestyle, problems exist beneath the surface in the suburb, and when neighbour Julia Stevens (Jackie Geurts)—a patient of Simon's—is found murdered in her home, the community is affected.

Worse still, as Detective Marie Da Silva (Madeleine Sami) gets her investigation underway, every clue seems to lead her back to the Lamptons – and in particular to Simon, who finds he may have been taking his privileged life for granted. What is Simon hiding? How have he and Ford been affected by their traumatic childhoods? And why has the enigmatic Roza Hallwright (Chelsie Preston Crayford), wife of soon-to-be next Prime Minister David Hallwright (Xavier Horan), taken such an interest in their troubled little family? As family secrets unravel and the Lampton's world begins to crumble, Detective DeSilva uncovers a web of lies spun by someone the Lamptons would never suspect.

== Cast ==
- Matt Minto as Simon Lampton
- Dean O'Gorman as Ford Lampton
- Jodie Hillock as Karen Lampton
- Xavier Horan as David Hallwright
- Chelsie Preston-Crayford as Roza Hallwright
- Madeleine Sami as Detective Marie Da Silva
- Zoe Jansson-Bush as Claire Lampton
- Madeleine McCarthy as Elke Lampton
- Vinnie Bennett as Detective Bennett
- Mayen Mehta as Detective Singh
- Kelson Henderson as Arty Cole
- Scott Wills as Inspector Gregan
- Calvin Tuteao as Ed Miles
- Danny Mulheron as Frank Lampton
- Jacqueline Lee Geurts as Julia Stevens
- Hannah Marshall as Tamara Goldwater
- Amanda Billing as Superintendent Jane Evans
- Keporah Torrance as Mereana Coles

== Characters ==
- Simon Lampton (Matt Minto) is a respected obstetrician. Simon on appears to have it all: a well-paying job, a beautiful house in one of Auckland's most expensive suburbs, a beautiful wife and two well behaved teenage daughters. Yet Simon is also deeply flawed, taking risks that put his family and future on the line. Haunted by the traumatic childhood he shared with older brother Ford until he was taken into foster care, Simon has a dark past he would like to keep secret – something that becomes harder and harder when he becomes a person of interest in a murder investigation.
- Ford Lampton (Dean O'Gorman) is working as an arborist and landscaper. Ford is rougher round the edges than his Simon, but appears content to take a more happy-go-lucky approach to life. Separated from his brother when Simon was put into foster care as a child, Ford was left to spend his adolescence alone with their abusive father - something about which the brothers rarely speak. Living with Simon and his wife Karen in their sprawling home's spare bedroom until he makes his next move, Ford is his brother's main confidant – a role that becomes increasingly tense when Simon is implicated in a murder investigation.
- Karen Lampton (Jodie Hillock) is an upper-middle class domestic goddess, and is a model of a mother to daughters Claire and Elka, sitting on the board of school trustees, tirelessly fundraising and maintaining the perfect home. What's more, she has built for her family powerful political connections, ingratiating herself with Prime Ministerial hopeful David Hallwright and his glamorous wife Roza. Yet while husband Simon provides her with every material comfort, she becomes increasingly concerned that her marriage may be in trouble – and, with Simon growing ever more distant in the midst of a murder investigation, realises that she will have to fight for her family.
- David Hallwright (Xavier Horan) is ambitious politician and self-made millionaire. David is willing to do anything to make his dream of becoming New Zealand's next Prime Minister come true – yet despite his ruthlessness remains powerless in the face of his wife Roza. Yet while he strives to keep her happy, it is also the enigmatic and impulsive Roza who threatens to derail David's campaign – and he soon realises that to get what he wants he will have to gain control over her life.
- Roza Hallwright (Chelsie Preston-Crayford) is cool, chic and icily remote. Roza finds herself the target of public scrutiny as husband David's political career takes off. Having reinvented herself after a troubled past, Roza is uncomfortable with the attention – but soon finds her powerful new status has advantages too, as she becomes increasingly obsessed with the Lampton family.
- Marie Da Silva (Madeleine Sami) is the detective put in charge of the Julia Stevens murder investigation. Dogged, determined and deeply intuitive, Marie can tell from the get-go that Julia's neighbour Simon is lying about something – and following her nose, begins to unravel a tangled web of secrets and lies in one of Auckland's wealthiest suburbs.

== Episodes ==
No.	Title	Directed by	Written by	Original release date
1	"Episode 1"	Helena Brooks	Sarah Kate-Lynch & Joss King	14 April 2019
Simon Lampton looks like he has the ideal life, but everything unravels when neighbour, Julia Stevens, is murdered and Simon's dysfunctional childhood comes back to haunt him.
2	"Episode 2"	Mike Smith	Michael Beran, Sarah Kate-Lynch & Joss King	15 April 2019
Simon begins to lose it emotionally as police pressure intensifies and his personal life crumbles. Ford helps and hinders his brother. Meanwhile, Roza drops a bombshell on Simon.
3	"Episode 3"	Caroline Bell-Booth	Sarah Kate-Lynch, Michael Beran & Joss King	16 April 2019
Roza finally confesses her secret to David. Karen's had enough of Simon's lying and kicks him out. Ford and Simon are forced to confront their violent father.
4	"Episode 4"	Caroline Bell-Booth	Sarah Kate-Lynch & Joss King	17 April 2019
Karen and Roza declare war. Roza has an emotional breakdown and overdoses. Simon is suspected of the murder of an investigative journalist and Ford manipulates Simon's misfortune.
5	"Episode 5"	Mike Smith	Sarah Kate-Lynch & Joss King	18 April 2019
Simon has a realisation about the murder but can't convince the cops. Roza has a double celebration on Election Day.
