= Genesis Potini =

New Zealand chess player (1963–2011)

Personal information
- Born: Genesis Wayne Potini; 5 September 1963
- Died: 15 August 2011 (aged 47) Gisborne, New Zealand

Chess career
- Country: New Zealand

Genesis Wayne Potini (5 September 1963 – 15 August 2011) was a New Zealand speed chess player.

== Life and work ==
Potini was of Māori descent. He was known for his skills as a speed (1 min.) chess player. Together with two friends, he formed a chess club (The Eastern Knights) where underprivileged children found a home base – and learned to play chess in the process. The chess club was also involved with the Ngāti Porou heritage. Potini suffered from a bipolar disorder and was regularly admitted to hospital. Despite this he was able to stabilise his life and during his last decade make a strong contribution to his community. He died of a heart attack in 2011 and was buried at Taruheru Cemetery in Gisborne.

== Documentary and feature film ==
In 2003 director Jim Marbrook made a documentary film about Potini (Dark Horse). The film was awarded the 2005 Best New Zealand Feature Documentary. In 2014 James Napier Robertson presented his feature film The Dark Horse (starring Cliff Curtis). The film won many awards, became a hit at the NZ box office, and was declared "one of the greatest New Zealand films ever made".
