= Kirk Torrance =

New Zealand actor and playwright

- Occupation: Actor
- Years active: 1995–present

Kirk Torrance is an actor and playwright from New Zealand, best known for his role as Wayne Judd in Outrageous Fortune. He is also a former Commonwealth Games swimmer.

== Career ==
His debut play Strata (2003) won Best New Playwright at the Chapman Tripp Theatre Awards. He played the lead role of Holden in the New Zealand movie Stickmen (2001) and award-winning television drama Fish Skin Suit (2003). While appearing on Outrageous Fortune, he hosted one series of a New Zealand version of The Real Hustle.

He was nominated Best Supporting Actor at the Qantas Film & Television Awards 2008 for his ex-cop role in the television series Outrageous Fortune. In 2008, he was named Sexiest Man in Auckland by Metro magazine.

Torrance is a graduate from Toi Whakaari New Zealand Drama School in Wellington, having graduated with a Diploma in Acting in 1994, upgraded to a Bachelor of Performing Arts (Acting) in 2003.

He is Māori of Ngāti Kahungunu heritage.

== Filmography ==
=== Film ===
Title	Year	Role	Notes
B Grade	2000	Dominic Matheson	Short film
Stickmen	2001	Holden	
Too Old for Swings	2010	—N/a	Short film, director
Ebony Society	2011	Eric	Short film
Sione's 2: Unfinished Business	2012	Cardinal Hoani	
The Dark Horse	2014	Noble	
Rūrangi	2020	Gerald Davis	Feature film
Cousins	2021	Oldest Sonny	

=== Television ===
Title	Year	Role	Notes
Swimming Lessons	1995	House Buyer	
Nga Wahine	1997	Matthew Williams	
Shortland Street	1998	Lee Kapene	1 episode
The Adventures of Swiss Family Robinson	1998	The King's brother	3 episodes
Duggan	1999	James Frankham	Episode: "Food to Die For"
Cleopatra 2525	2000	Blade	Episode: "The Watch"
Xena: Warrior Princess	2001	Demetrius	Episode: "Old Ares Had a Farm"
Mataku	2002	Temuera	Episode: "The Blue Line"
The Insiders Guide to Happiness	2004	Police Negotiator	Episode: "You Are Happy"
Shortland Street	2004–05	Dr. Bronson Paraone	
Holly's Heroes	2005	Tony McKenzie	Main role
Outrageous Fortune	2005–10	Detective Sergeant Wayne Judd	Main role (100 episodes)
The Lost Children	2006	Ranginui	2 episodes
Legend of the Seeker	2009	Krilmark	Episode "Marked"
The Real Hustle NZ	2010	Presenter	
The Almighty Johnsons	2012	George	3 episodes
Siege	2012	Sergeant Heath Jones	Television film
Tatau	2015	Reverend Calcott	Main role, Miniseries
Power Rangers Dino Charge	2015	Dr. Runga	Episode: "Deep Down Under"
Wanted	2017	Cliff	2 episodes
Filthy Rich	2017	Ariki	Recurring role (season 2; 8 episodes)
Wilde Ride	2017	Tom	Main role
The New Legends of Monkey	2018	Master	Episode: "Episode 6"
The Dead Lands (TV series)	2019	Whiro, God of Caos	Main role (Season 1)
Mystic	2020-	Tom Avery	Main role (Season 1 - 3)
Under the Vines	2024-	Dr David	Recurring role (Series 2-3)

=== Video game ===
Title	Year	Role	Notes
Far Cry 3	2012		Additional voices

=== Web ===
Title	Year	Role	Notes
High Road	2016	Dr. Karl	Episode: "The Straw"
