= Rūrangi =

2020 New Zealand LGBT-related drama film

- Film poster
- Directed by: Max Currie
- Written by: Cole Meyers; Oliver Page
- Produced by: Craig Gainsborough-Waring
- Starring: Elz Carrad; Liam Coleman; Kirk Torrance; Awhina-Rose Ashby; Aroha Rawson; Renee Sheridan
- Cinematography: Johannes Louis
- Edited by: Brough Johnson; Dan Kircher
- Music by: Lachlan Anderson
- Production company: Autonomouse
- Distributed by: The Yellow Affair
- Release date: 26 July 2020
- Running time: 87 minutes
- Country: New Zealand
- Languages: English; Māori
- Box office: $11,624

Rūrangi is a 2020 New Zealand LGBT-related independent drama film directed by Max Currie. The queer and trans-positive drama was written by Cole Meyers and Oliver Page. It stars Elz Carrad in his feature film debut, along with Arlo Green, Kirk Torrance, Awhina-Rose Ashby, Aroha Rawson, Renee Sheridan and Ramon Te Wake.

The film had its world premiere at the New Zealand International Film Festival on 26 July 2020. It was screened at the Frameline Film Festival in San Francisco, where it won an Audience Award for Best Narrative Feature, and was released to New Zealand theatres on 4 February 2021. All of the trans characters in the film are portrayed by trans actors. The project was initially released as a five-part web series, which was edited into a feature film for international release. The film was later made into a TV series which won Best Short-Form Series at the 50th International Emmy Awards in 2022.

== Synopsis ==
Caz Davis left his home in the small town of Rūrangi, abandoning everyone, and moved to Auckland to start his new life where he transitions. Years later, he returns to the town where he grew up for the first time as an out trans man. He now must face the people whom he abandoned and start to rebuild those relationships. His father is upset with him for missing his mother's funeral, and is also trying to process his transition from being his daughter to now being his trans son. Anahera, his best friend growing up, who is now trying to re-connect with her Māori heritage, is also confused and hurt by his sudden decision to leave without saying good-bye. When he finally faces his ex-boyfriend Jem, who had already made life plans for the two of them to be together, he must explain his reasons for leaving him behind. Meanwhile, Jem is questioning his uncertain feelings, because he is still attracted to Caz, but unsure if it's old feelings coming to the surface, or whether he is now attracted to Caz's masculinity.

== Cast ==
- Elz Carrad as Caz Davis
- Arlo Green as Jem
- Kirk Torrance as Gerald Davis
- Awhina-Rose Ashby as Anahera
- Aroha Rawson as Whina Rangi
- Renee Sheridan as Agnes
- Ramon Te Wake as Ellie
- Sonny Tupu as Andrew Ainofo
- Adam Rohe as Jamie
- Tai Berdinner-Blades as Sasha Ainofo
- Adam Brown as Curt
- Mustaq Missouri as Councillor Ron
- Kate McGill as Ria
- Nikki Si'ulepa as Hui MC
- Ross Harper as Harry
- Renee Lyons as Colleen Richter

== Production notes ==
The project was initially planned to be a five-part web series, but was later edited together into a feature film. 59% of the cast and crew on the production are non-binary, and all trans characters are played by trans actors. The producers and director consulted with an advisory panel of trans people from the trans community for the film, who also had veto power over the production. Taika Waititi's sister Tweedie was also brought in as a consultant on the film to help develop the Māori storylines to ensure an accurate and authentic representation. In an interview with Marten Rabarts of the New Zealand International Film Festival, lead actor Elz Carrad revealed that he had never met another transgender person before he took on the role of Caz in the film. The movie was filmed on location in Auckland and the Hauraki Plains.

We’re not interested in seeing another story told about us, any more transition stories, trauma or tropes. These are so often about how other people see us, how other people experience us. We want to see stories on screen made by us.

— Cole Meyers (writer and co-producer)

Writer Cole Meyers, who is gender diverse, said that the majority of what you see portrayed in the media in relation to transgender people is "filtered through or created by cis people’s understandings of our lives" which results in a biased view of "always seeing ourselves through other people's eyes". So they set out to create a film that was 'by us and about us', and that meant making sure the audience got to see trans-positive experiences in the film, and show that they have love for themselves, along with affection from friends, family and the community. Meyers also said they created a paid internship programme for the film, funded by the New Zealand Film Commission, that partnered trans-interns with the heads of departments, to help develop a future generation of gender diverse professionals in the film industry.

In an interview with GQ Australia, director Max Currie said he was sort of apprehensive about signing on with the project, because of the condition that all trans characters be played by trans actors. He was concerned that they wouldn't be able to fill all the designated trans roles with actors who had extensive film experience. When Elz Carrad, who had no prior experience in theatre, TV or film, sent in an audition tape, Currie said he was "extraordinary", and not only was he trans, but also Māori. After seeing Carrad's audition, Currie said he realised that this production was going to be "something really special", and went on to say that it's "really important that those characters are owned and created by people who have that life experience". As for his own involvement in the film, Currie said the producers tried to find a trans director, but couldn't due to a lack of experience, so they settled on a "salty old homosexual".

Both director Max Currie and lead actor Elz Carrad appeared in RuPaul's Drag Race Down Under season 1, Carrad as a guest judge and Currie as a member of the show's Pit Crew.

== Release ==
The film premiered worldwide at the New Zealand International Film Festival on 26 July 2020. It was later screened in September 2020 at the Frameline Film Festival in San Francisco, where it won an Audience Award for Best Narrative Feature. It also had additional screenings at the BFI Flare: London LGBTIQ+ Film Festival, the Melbourne Queer Film Festival and the Mardi Gras Film Festival.

It was released to New Zealand theatres on 4 February 2021, with an opening weekend gross of $2,822, and had a total international gross of $11,624. Hulu picked up the TV broadcast rights for the series while it was still playing in theatres, and there is a second season already in development.

== Critical reception ==
Chad Armstrong wrote in The Queer Review that one of the films "great strengths is its no-nonsense, antipodean humour". Overall he found it "enjoyable and well-rounded", and gave the film. Film critic Amelia Berry said the film had "a stunning debut performance from Elz Carrad", and the movie "communicates trans experiences like no other before it". Alex Heeney said it is a film that "is all in the character details, and is filled with so many beautiful, lived in performances" and it is definitely an "emotionally satisfying and cathartic experience".

into:screens said the film offers "genuine representation of Aotearoa’s transgender community in both performative and production roles", and that is a "momentous victory". They also praised trans advocate and co-writer Cole Meyers, for doing an "incredible job at creating a heartwarming, realistic narrative that celebrates the trans community, Māori culture...and friendships that transcend gender and sexuality". They rated it a full five stars. Alistair Ryder writing in View of the Arts said it will "prove enlightening for cis viewers, but the film isn’t directly aimed at them, it’s an authentic account of a specific trans experience that is rarely dramatised in this way...and is a slow-burning character study that reveals itself to be insightful and charming in equal measure".

Graeme Tuckett from Stuff wrote "the performances and writing are universally strong, the camera work, sound and especially the editing are excellent and the storytelling is clear and sharp". Sara Clements of Awards Watch praised the film saying it is a "nuanced look at identity through a trans lens...it looks at the positive aspects of trans lives, not solely making their struggles the focus". Clement said Carrad's performance is "incredible and authentic, a true breakout star" and ended the review by concluding that when a film of this nature is told through the perspective of those who have actually lived through these experiences, "it proves how moving and powerful these kinds of films can be if they are told by the right people". American review aggregator Rotten Tomatoes has a 100% favourable rating for the film based on film critics reviews.

== See also ==
- LGBT in New Zealand
- List of LGBT-related films of 2020
- Transgender in film and television
- Transgender rights in New Zealand
