= The Last Saint =

- Directed by: Rene Naufahu
- Written by: Rene Naufahu
- Produced by: Matthew Horrocks
- Starring: Beulah Koale; Calvin Tuteao; Joe Naufahu
- Cinematography: Grant McKinnon
- Edited by: Eric De Beus
- Music by: OJ Raj; Thomas Rose
- Release date: 21 August 2014
- Running time: 111 min
- Country: New Zealand
- Language: English

The Last Saint is a 2014 New Zealand film written and directed by Rene Naufahu. It was Naufahu debut feature and it was nominated for nine awards at the 2014 New Zealand Film Awards It premiered in Auckland on 21 August and was shot with budget of $120,000 in just 20 days.

== Cast ==
- Beulah Koale as Minka
- Calvin Tuteao as Joe
- Joe Naufahu as Pinball
- Xavier Horan as Tiger
- Joy Vaele as Lia
- Colin Moy as Spanner
- Sophia Huybens as Zoey
- Jared Turner as Gaz
- Mike King as Tui

== Reception ==
The New Zealand Herald's Francesca Rudkin gives it 4 stars and says "I'm not qualified to know if this is an authentic look at gang turf wars or P addiction, but it certainly feels it. Some will find The Last Saint polarising and challenging, but you only have to see the news or head to the courts to see the effect of P addiction, and for that reason alone Naufahu should be applauded for tackling the subject." Sarah Watt from Sunday Star Times gave it 4 stars and writes "Among The Last Saint's many strengths are its energy, its unrelenting, in-your-face (and eardrums) brutality and its endearing central performances. This is impressive genre fare, well-executed and intoxicating" Graeme Tuckett in the Press also gave it 4 stars. He says "Yes, there are a few clunky lines, and not all the support actors can keep up with the work of the leads. And yes, the screenplay dives too readily into the tropes of gangster movies set in London or New York. But for its energy, for the craft and love that have gone into making it and for the fact it actually exists, The Last Saint is one to celebrate, and to see."
