= Chad Taylor (writer) =

New Zealand writer

Chad Taylor (born 1964) is a New Zealand writer.

== Life ==
Chad Taylor is a New Zealand author of novels, short stories and screenplays. He was born in Auckland. He received a Bachelor of Fine Arts from Elam School of Fine Arts. He was the recipient of the Buddle Findlay Sargeson Fellowship for literature in 2001 and the University of Auckland Literary Fellow in 2003. His work has been translated in Germany, Italy and France. In 2006 he was one of 12 New Zealand authors invited to tour France for Les Belles Etrangeres. He appeared at the Frankfurt Book Fair in 2012. He currently resides in New Zealand.

== Work ==
Taylor's style can be described as neo-noir. His themes include murder and love, sex, reality, identity and life in an intense, urban environment. The Oxford Companion to New Zealand Literature (1998) described him as:

A writer of uncompromisingly contemporary fictions of transience and shifting realities in the modern city. Born and educated in Auckland, where his work is largely set, he graduated BFA at Elam and has carried that interest into the strong visual quality of his writing... The fictions often work on the edge of such conventions as the murder story ('No Sun, No Rain'), futuristic fantasy ('Somewhere in the 21st Century') or romance triangle (Pack of Lies, 'Calling Doctor Dollywell'), often through unreliable or unattractive narrators... As these literary norms are subverted, perceptions of reality and identity are challenged. Strong visual representations, especially of sex and clothing, and filmic treatment with fragmentary and mobile scenes and chronology, provide metaphorical access to these internal concerns.

Guardian Critic Maxim Jakubowski described Taylor's novel Electric (2003) as "entropy noir" and praised Shirker (2000) for its "existential anomie."

Much more ambitious, and weaving a seductive web of existential anomie, is Chad Taylor's Shirker, a fascinating and obsessive novel from New Zealand with shades of Paul Auster's New York Trilogy. Ellerslie Penrose, a part-time futures broker, finds a junkie's body in an Auckland dumpster, steals his wallet and embarks on a hallucinatory journey into the shadow life of the dead man. This brings him into contact with fantasy bordellos, mysterious manuscripts, bizarre antiques dealers, and a sleazy nest of quirky happenstance. Oddly detached from its subject matter, this is as hypnotic as they come; it's also miles away from the conventions of your average country-cottage crime or pig-headed cop yarn. One for the connoisseurs.

Taylor acknowledged the "noir" label in a 2009 interview:

I’ve basically deconstructed crime novels: I’ve taken aspects of crime novels, rewritten them, taken them apart. People used to ask me, “What do you write?”... I just don’t know. But you have come up with a word for what you do. ‘Noir’ kind of fits it.

In 1998, his novel Heaven was made into a feature film by Miramax. The film was produced by Sue Rogers and directed by Scott Reynolds. It had a mix of New Zealand actors and American actors such as Martin Donovan and Joanna Going, with filming taking place in Auckland. Taylor has also written for film including the original screenplay for the short film Funny Little Guy (1994), directed by Chris Graves. In May 2003 the NZ Listener listed him as one of "New Zealand's Top Ten Novelists Under 40."

Electric (2003) is set in Auckland during the power cuts that blacked out the city in 1998. Time Out London selected the novel as Book of the Week on 22 January 2003. Time Out critic Roger Howard described Electric as a story of chaos and urban malaise:

His setting is a New Zealand you won't see in Lord of the Rings: a city suffering from the same urban malaise as glitzier metropolises on other continents. Our protagonist, Samuel Usher, is a drug addict who supports himself by recovering data from damaged computers. He falls in with a couple of drifters who occupy themselves with recondite mathematics. But the favoured activity for all three involves powders on polished surfaces. When Jules dies in mysterious circumstances, Usher sets off to find out why. Thematically, Taylor's concerns are twofold: the infinite extent of digitised culture; and the limitless flood of narcotics (not to mention the global industry behind it). Electric looks at what happens when chaos rises up to warp these apparently unassailable worlds.

The novel Departure Lounge (2006) is based on the 1979 Erebus crash. Washington Post critic Jonathan Yardley compared the novel's style to Raymond Chandler:

His style owes a lot to Raymond Chandler and lesser apostles of noir, but at the same time it's very much his own. His prose is spare but with a strong undercurrent of emotion; "cool" certainly is the word for him, but there's a good deal of heat beneath.

Houston Chronicle critic P.G. Koch described Departure Lounge as a crime novel that played with expectations of the genre:

New Zealand writer Chad Taylor plays with the crime/noir genre for his own philosophical purposes in an open-ended way that subverts reassuring convention. In Departure Lounge, we first glimpse a newscast tragedy — a plane that has vanished in Antarctica — before moving on to the book's narrator, Mark Chamberlain, as he shoots pool with Rory, a real estate developer who is short on scruples and whose apartment Mark later burgles... For all its nighttime street life of taxis and clubs, this is an oddly silent book. It is as if we move through its impeccable structure seeking resolution the same way that Mark ghosts through all those houses he breaks into. Taylor in effect has taken the not-knowing at the mystery genre's core and enshrined it, occupied its amorphous territory and made of it, as in this slight book's emotional peak, a luminous art.

In 2008 UK Guardian critic Maxim Jakubowski described Chad Taylor as a cult author:

Taylor is a minimalist whose tortured characters populate a world where silence and night form a disconsolate backdrop for their musings and meanderings across a landscape of bleak, concrete cities... (He has) a profound empathy for the losers in our midst and an acute sense of place and the bizarre in everyday life.

Taylor's 2009 novel The Church of John Coltrane (2009) was a sequel to Heaven.

In 2013 New Zealand director Jonathan King began filming Taylor's original screenplay REALITi in Wellington, New Zealand. The film is a science fiction / noir set in the near future. Taylor has described it as a "talkie" and "a science fiction film with no special effects." The cast of REALITi includes Nathan Meister, Michelle Langstone, Miranda Manasiadis, Graham McTavish, Tim Wong and Aroha White. The film premiered at the New Zealand International Film Festival and at Fantastic Fest. Harry Knowles reviewed the movie at Ain't It Cool News:

This is a deliberately paced mind bender ... A societal science fiction horror film. Now, it isn’t horror in the bogeyman sense, it’s horror because the idea of chemicals that can reprogram your perception of reality toward a corporate or governmental agenda is not only terrifying, but ingested intelligence is something that some scientists and tech watchers are predicting as being something that will be in our world in very short order. We’ve heard that the powers that be have figured out how to suppress and alter memories and this film plays with that disconcerting reality. Nathan Meister does a great job of being off center throughout the film. He’s having colliding realities that are not discernable to his senses, but he’s feeling things are slipping. He’s trying to understand what happened to him, and navigating this bad trip is... well, the fun of this film. The more you hang in there, the more you’re rewarded.

REALITi was nominated for five categories in the 2014 Rialto Channel New Zealand Film Awards, including Best Screenplay.

Bears Fonte writing in AMFM Magazine called REALITi "one of the most fascinating films I’ve seen in the last few years ... The audience is constantly wondering is the world changing, or is it just one man cracking up? He might be saving the world, but he also just might be paranoid. REALITI never really lets you get a firm foothold because Vic doesn’t either, and like a great noir, we are left to follow the clues with him."

In 2015 Taylor dramatised his short story 'Close to You' for Radio New Zealand. The play was nominated for Best Drama in the Asia-Pacific Broadcasting Union (ABU) Prizes 2016.

His seventh novel Blue Hotel (2022) was a finalist in the Best Novel category in the 2023 Ngaio Marsh Awards.

== List of Publications ==
- Pack of Lies (1994), Novel, (Hazard Press (NZ); Mana Verlag (Germany))
- Heaven (1994), Novel, (David Ling (NZ))
- The Man Who Wasn't Feeling Himself (1995), Short Story Collection, (David Ling (NZ))
- Shirker (2000), Novel, (Canongate Books (UK & Commonwealth); Christian Bourgois (France); DTV (Germany); Neri Pozza (Italy); Walker Books (USA)
- Electric (2003), Novel, (Jonathan Cape (UK); Random House (UK & Commonwealth); Christian Bourgois (France))
- Departure Lounge (2006), Novel, (Jonathan Cape, (UK); Random House (UK & Commonwealth); Christian Bourgois (France); Europa Editions (USA); Edizione EO (Italy))
- The Church of John Coltrane (2009), novel, (Christian Bourgois, (France))
- Blue Hotel (2022), novel, (Brio Books, (Australia))
