= Xavier Horan =

New Zealand actor

- Occupation: Actor

Xavier Horan is a New Zealand actor. He was nominated for Best Performance by an Actor in a Supporting Role - Film and for Best Performance by an Actor - Television at the 2006 Air New Zealand Screen Awards for Best Actor for his roles in No. 2 and The Market respectively and was nominated for Best Actor in a Series at the 2025 New Zealand Screen Awards for his role in Dead Ahead.

Horan has starred as Phineas O'Driscoll in Westside, Tyson in No. 2, Mike in The Market, Kurt Williams in Ride With the Devil, Rangi in The Dead Lands and Matiu Wharekoa in Dead Ahead.

Other screen roles include playing multiple characters in Only In Aotearoa, Tiger in The Last Saint, David Hallwright in The Bad Seed and both Tai Scott and Doctor Ihaka Herewini in Shortland Street

Horan has Ngāti Awa and Ngāti Pikiao heritage.
