= I Survived a Zombie Holocaust =

I Survived A Zombie Holocaust
- Film poster
- Directed by: Guy Pigden
- Written by: Guy Pigden
- Produced by: Gallien Chanalet-Quercy; Zoe Hobson; Zane Holmes
- Starring: Harley Neville; Jocelyn Christian; Ben Baker
- Cinematography: Jon Wilson
- Edited by: Tori Bindoff
- Music by: Mike J. Newport
- Production company: 38 Pictures
- Release date: 16 August 2014
- Running time: 104 minutes
- Country: New Zealand
- Language: English

I Survived a Zombie Holocaust is a 2014 horror film that was directed and written by Guy Pigden, and is his feature film directorial debut. The film had its world premiere on 16 August 2014 in Dunedin, New Zealand. Filming for I Survived a Zombie Holocaust took place in Dunedin and was credited by its producer Zoe Hobson as being "the first New Zealand Film Commission-funded feature to be made in Dunedin with a local cast and crew in 15 years."

== Plot ==
Wesley is an aspiring writer late to his first day on the job as a runner on the set of a zombie film. His first task is to take one of the actors to a doctor; the nearby village is suffering from an actual zombie outbreak, but Wesley leaves the actor there without realizing this.

During one shoot meant to be a sex scene, Wesley ruins the moment, and the actors begin fighting. Wesley is forced to stand in for the scene but Jessica bails out when Wesley gets an erection, much to his humiliation.

Wesley considers giving up on the film industry when Tane says his story of him winning the championship game should inspire him to not quit. During another shoot Greg tries to warn everyone about the zombies but his method acting causes nobody to believe him. Jessica then demands to go to the village to use the toilet and mocks the "peasants" around her when its suggested she use the long drop. SMP becomes infuriated with her bossiness and says the only reason she got far in her career is because of her breasts and that they won't last forever and says if she wants a career beyond the age of 35 to stop acting like a diva and do as she's told. She goes into the long drop but a hand emerges scaring her. Wesley is forced to dig a hole in the woods so Jessica can use the bathroom. However she becomes surrounded by zombies and is attacked and bitten offscreen.

Wesley is awoken from a nap but is unable to find Jessica, who soon arrives on set but is now a zombie. Not realizing this, SMP believes her to be on drugs. She is taken to a trailer but not before biting a worker. Wesley encounters Greg and some "props" and is attacked. Wesley soon realises the "props" are real body parts and fends off the zombie Greg and is able to kill him. When Wesley sees a corpse awaken and eat itself, Wesley realises there are real zombies and goes to help Susan. The zombies from the village arrive and soon begin eating the zombie actors, creating a blood bath. Wesley is able to kill a zombie attacking Susan while Susan kills another. Trying to escape, some of the zombie actors beg for help but the prop master, Randy Bateman starts killing the actors, believing them to be zombies. Randy arms himself with a machine gun and tries to clear a path but instead accidentally blows his own brains out. Harold is killed and eaten when he stops to get his notebook.

SMP reveals that it took him ten years to get the funding needed for his film as the film commission refused to help him. Determined to get his film finished, he and Richard get a digital camera. Adam encounters Jessica with her breasts out and not realizing she's a zombie, has sex with her. Wesley and the others kill the zombies near the trailer and explain the situation. Asking if he got bit during sex, Adam takes off his shirt and shows off his body, devoid of bites. Tane asks if he could have gotten it from sex, but Adam says he used protection as he learned about herpes the hard way. The group flees into the woods. Meanwhile, surrounded by zombies, SMP allows Richard to call him Stanley and Richard sacrifices himself to the zombies so SMP can immortalize Richard on film for all time. Now completely insane, SMP soon records himself being eaten by the zombies.

In a swamp, Adam sees a zombie behind Tane and hides letting Tane get bitten in the process. The group reach a farm and sees a truck that needs gas. Adam shoots the zombie farmer attracting the rest of the zombies to their location. Adam says that no one would care if the rest are killed but he's more important since he's famous. Adam prepares to kill the rest but he soon needs the bathroom and decides to trust Wesley who claims his safety was top priority. Adam soon pees out blood and soon sees his penis is horribly mutilated, presumably from Jessica. He soon starts coughing blood. Tane sees that a shed contains the gas and prepares to fill up a tank with gas so Wesley and Susan can escape as he'd become a zombie soon anyway.

Tane reveals his story of winning the championship game was a lie and his glory run cost everyone the game. However he says he wouldn't change a thing as you should always go for glory. Tane is swarmed by zombies but he fights them off and fills up a gas tank and get it to the truck. Tane sets the shed on fire and taunts the zombies into attacking him. Susan prepares to leave but a now zombified Adam attacks her. Wesley stabs Adam but gets his hand bit in the process. To stop the process, Susan chops off Wesley's hand and cauterizes the wound with a hot cast iron pan. The shed explodes, killing Tane and most of the zombies. Wesley and Susan prepare to escape but Susan was rusty with the truck controls. Adam shows up despite being stabbed in the brain and attacks Susan. Wesley fires a gun at Adam's head, killing him for good and the two escape. Susan says she'd consider dating Wesley as he's now one of the last men on Earth. The two reach a town and are attacked by zombies.

However, a shout of cut reveals the town was part of a scene being shot by Wesley who's directing a zombie movie based on the events of what happened. How he and Susan survived is never revealed but apparently the world gets back to normal at some point.

== Cast ==
- Harley Neville as Wesley Pennington
- Jocelyn Christian as Susan Ford
- Ben Baker as Tane Henare
- Reanin Johannink as Jessica Valentine
- Mike Edward as Adam Harrison
- Andrew Laing as SMP
- Simon Ward as Richard Driver
- Mark Neilson as Randy Bateman
- Patrick Davies as Greg Winston
- Harry Love as Harold Beasley

== Reception ==
Critical reception for I Survived a Zombie Holocaust has been positive. Grolsch Film Works and Nerdly both praised the film, with Grolsch Film Works stating "More or less immunising itself against charges of unoriginality by constantly offering reflexive commentary on its own movie-bound qualities (or lack thereof), Pigden's film is an affectionate trawl though the mechanics of the modern zombie picture." SciFiNow was more critical in their review, writing "This well-intentioned horror comedy gets a few laughs and the cast are game (Ben Baker is particularly fun as ex-rugby player and glory-days obsessed Tane) but there’s not really too much going on here beyond the meta zombie movie jokes. One or two sequences work very well (such as the director convincing his first AD to literally sacrifice himself for the art) but it’s overlong at 100-odd minutes and it struggles to find jokes beyond the self-referential. It’s difficult to criticise a film this amiable too harshly, but it’s not particularly funny."
