= Mana Hira Davis =

New Zealand stunt performer

Mana Hira Davis is a New Zealand stuntman, known best for his stunt work in The Lord of the Rings film trilogy.

== Filmography ==
=== Stunts ===
- The Lord of the Rings: The Fellowship of the Ring (2001): Stunt Performer
- The Lord of the Rings: The Two Towers (2002): Stunt Performer
- The Lord of the Rings: The Return of the King (2003): Stunt Performer
- Without a Paddle (2004): Stunts (stunt double Dax Shephard)
- River Queen (2005): Stunts
- King Kong (2005): Stunt Performer
- X-Men: The Last Stand (2006): Stunts
- The Waterhorse (2007): Stunts
- 30 Days of Night (2007): Utility Stunts (stunt double Josh Hartnett)

=== Miscellaneous crew ===
- The Last Samurai (2003) - Assistant Location Manager

=== Actor ===
- The Lord of the Rings: The Fellowship of the Ring (2001) - Goblin / Orc / Uruk-hai (uncredited)
- Turangawaewae (2002, Short) - Vietnam Soldier
- The Lord of the Rings: The Two Towers (2002) - Gondorian Soldier / Harad Warrior / Orc / Rohan Soldier / Uruk-hai (uncredited)
- King Kong (2005) - Army Soldier / Sailor / Skull Island Native (uncredited)
- The Chronicles of Narnia: Prince Caspian (2008) - Telmarine Soldier in Boat #1
- Ghost in the Shell (2017) - Bearded Man
