= Lawrence Makoare =

New Zealand actor

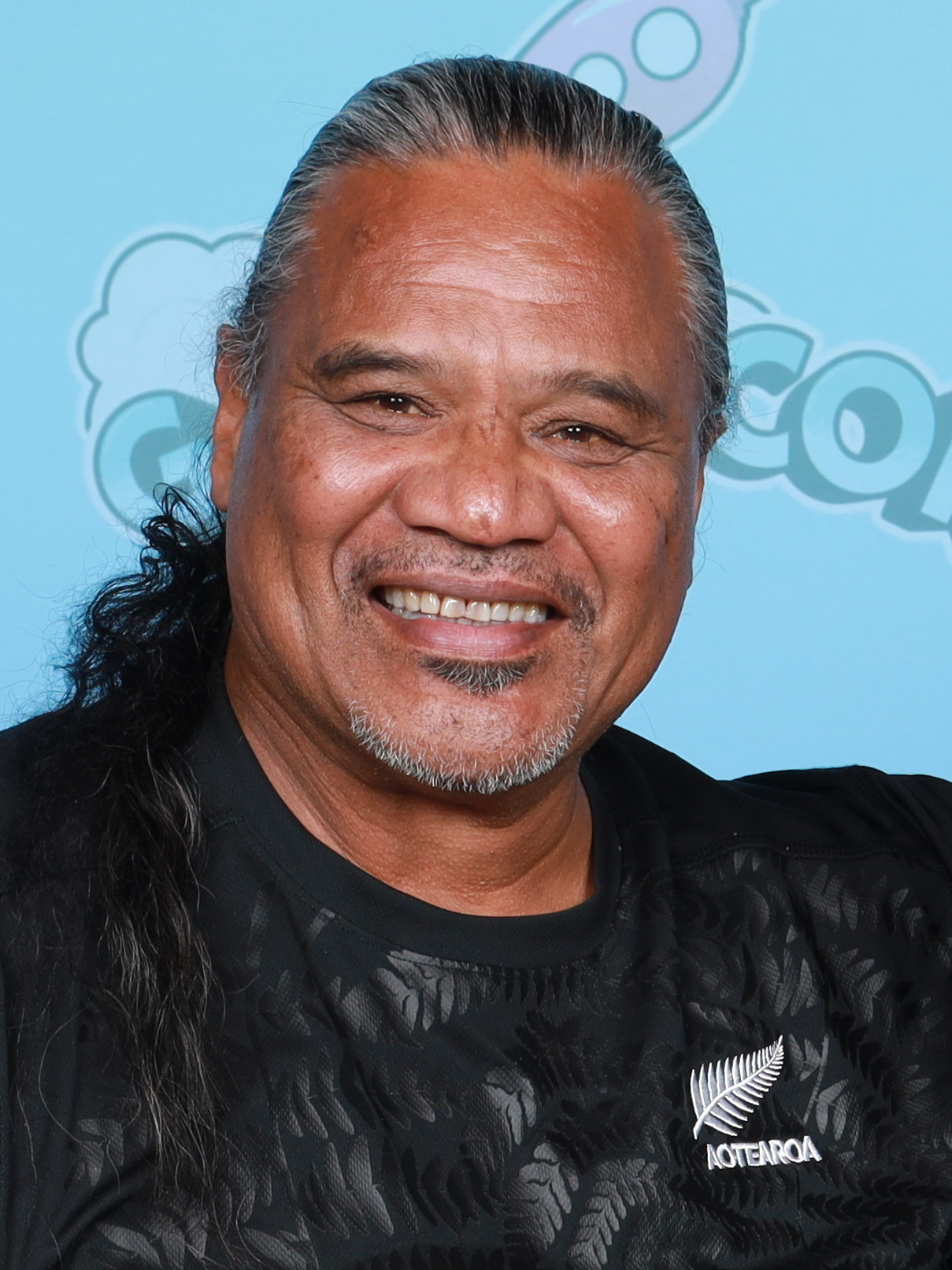
- Makoare at GalaxyCon St. Louis in 2025
- Born: 20 March 1968 (age 58); Bastion Point, Auckland, New Zealand
- Occupation: Actor
- Known for: The Lord of the Rings; The Hobbit; Xena: Warrior Princess

Lawrence Makoare (born 20 March 1968) is a New Zealand actor. He is most known for his roles in The Lord of the Rings film series as several prominent antagonists, including Lurtz the Uruk-Hai and the Witch-King of Angmar.

== Career ==
Makoare was a road construction builder who drifted into acting after he accompanied a girlfriend to a drama class and was picked out by the teacher to perform because of his impressive height. He began his career performing as a stuntman. Makoare is best known for his roles in The Lord of the Rings and The Hobbit film trilogies. In The Fellowship of the Ring, he portrayed the Uruk-hai leader Lurtz, and in The Return of the King, he portrayed the Witch-king of Angmar as well as Gothmog, the Orc commander at the Battle of the Pelennor Fields. In The Hobbit: The Desolation of Smaug, he portrayed the Orc commander Bolg, son of Azog. Due to filming commitments on Marco Polo, Makoare was unavailable during the pick-ups shooting of The Hobbit: The Battle of the Five Armies, in which Bolg is portrayed by John Tui instead.

Makoare is also popular among Xena: Warrior Princess fans, having played two memorable characters in the third season: a Barbarian leader in episode "The Quill Is Mightier..."; and Maecanus (a minion of Aphrodite) in episode "Fins, Femmes and Gems". In 2002, he portrayed Mr. Kil in the James Bond film Die Another Day. The director of The Dead Lands, Toa Fraser, was not enthusiastic about using Makoare as the warrior, but was won over by the way he managed, after a few directing hints, to turn in a performance that made him weep.

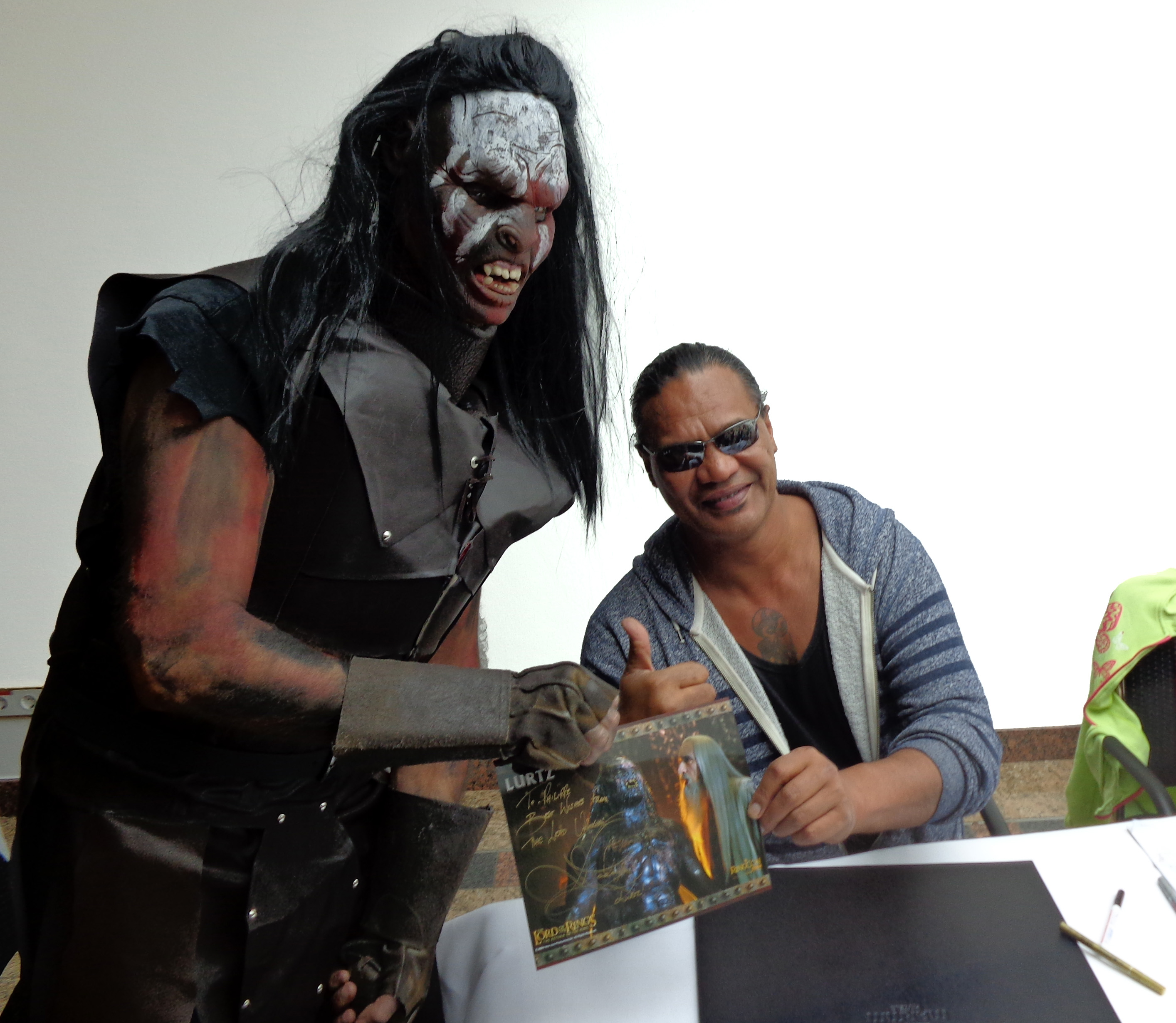
Makoare with a fan cosplaying as Lurtz, his character from The Lord of the Rings: The Fellowship of the Ring.

== Filmography ==
| Year | Title | Role | Notes |
|---|---|---|---|
| 1994 | Rapa Nui | Atta | |
| 1999 | What Becomes of the Broken Hearted? | Grunt | |
| 1999 | Greenstone | Rameka | TV series |
| 2000 | The Feathers of Peace | Pemako | |
| 2000 | The Price of Milk | Nephew | |
| 2001 | Crooked Earth | Kahu Bastion | |
| 2001 | The Lord of the Rings: The Fellowship of the Ring | Lurtz | |
| 2002 | The Maori Merchant of Venice | Pirihina o Morako (The Prince of Morocco) | |
| 2002 | Die Another Day | Mr Kil | |
| 2003 | The Lord of the Rings: The Return of the King | Witch-King of Angmar / Gothmog | |
| 2007 | The Ferryman | Snake | |
| 2012 | L'oncle Charles | Ratu | |
| 2012 | Fundamental | J.T. | |
| 2013 | The Hobbit: The Desolation of Smaug | Bolg | |
| 2014 | Marco Polo | Za Bing | TV series |
| 2014 | The Dead Lands | The Warrior | |
| 2021 | Occupation: Rainfall | Gary | |
| 2023 | The Convert | Akatarewa | |
| 2025 | Forgive Us All | Supporting role | |
