= Cliff Curtis =

New Zealand actor (born 1968)

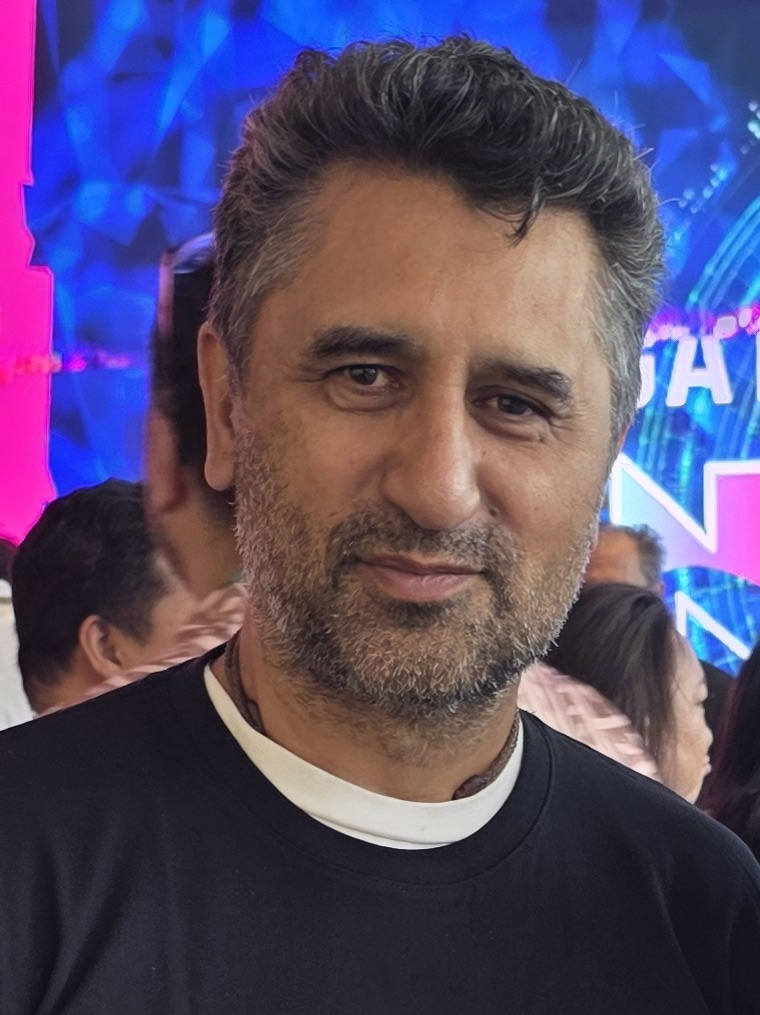
- Curtis in 2026
- Born: Clifford Vivian Devon Curtis; 27 July 1968 (age 58); Rotorua, New Zealand
- Education: Toi Whakaari (BFA)
- Occupations: Actor; producer
- Years active: 1991–present
- Children: 4
- Relatives: Toby Curtis (uncle)

Clifford Vivian Devon Curtis (born 27 July 1968) is a New Zealand actor and film producer. After working in theatre, he made his film debut in Jane Campion's Oscar-winning film The Piano (1993), followed by a breakout role in the drama Once Were Warriors (1994). He has won four New Zealand Film Awards, Best Actor for Jubilee (2000) and The Dark Horse (2014)—which also earned him the Asia Pacific Screen Award—and Best Supporting Actor for Desperate Remedies (1993) and Whale Rider (2002).

Curtis' international film credits include Three Kings, Bringing Out the Dead (both 1999), Blow, Training Day (both 2001), Collateral Damage (2002), Sunshine, Live Free or Die Hard (both 2007), Push, Crossing Over (both 2009), Colombiana (2011), Hobbs & Shaw, and Doctor Sleep (both 2019), also portraying James "Mac" Mackreides in The Meg (2018) and Meg 2: The Trench (2023) and Tonowari in the Avatar series (2022–present).

He had television series roles on NBC's Trauma and ABC's Body of Proof and Missing. From 2015 to 2017, he portrayed Travis Manawa on the AMC horror drama series Fear the Walking Dead. Curtis is also the co-owner of the independent New Zealand production company Whenua Films.

== Early life and education ==
Clifford Vivian Devon Curtis was born in Rotorua on 27 July 1968, one of eight children born into a family of Māori descent. His tribal affiliations are Te Arawa and Ngāti Hauiti. His uncle was Māori leader and educator Toby Curtis.

As a child, he studied mau rākau—a traditional Māori martial art involving taiaha combat—under elder Mita Mohi on Mokoia Island. This training informed his early performances in kapa haka. He subsequently competed in breakdancing and rock 'n' roll dance competitions, winning national titles in the late 1980s.

Curtis received his secondary education at Edmund Rice College, Rotorua, before enrolling at the New Zealand Drama School, Toi Whakaari, where he graduated with a Diploma in Acting in 1989.

== Career ==
=== New Zealand ===
Curtis started acting in amateur productions of musicals Fiddler on the Roof and Man of La Mancha with the Kapiti Players and the Mantis Cooperative Theatre Company, before attending the New Zealand Drama School and Teatro Dimitri Scuola in Switzerland. He worked at a number of New Zealand theatre companies, including Downstage, Mercury Theatre, Bats Theatre, and Centre Point. His stage roles include Happy End, The Merry Wives of Windsor, Othello, The Cherry Orchard, Porgy and Bess, Weeds, Macbeth, Serious Money, and The End of the Golden Weather.

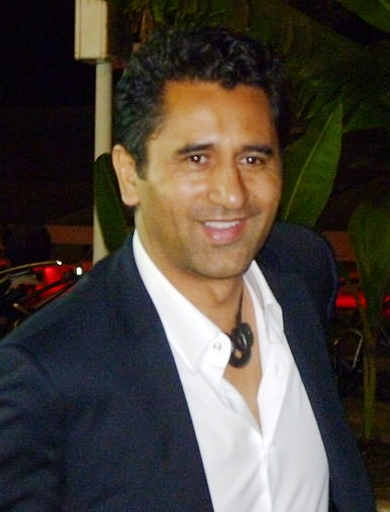
Curtis at the 2011 MIPCOM, in Cannes

His first feature film role was a small part in the Oscar-nominated Jane Campion film The Piano. He went on to win attention in Once Were Warriors, one of the most successful films released on New Zealand screens; the line "Uncle fucken Bully" referring to Curtis's character spoken by "Jake the Muss", played by Temuera Morrison, became one of New Zealand film's most memorable and quoted lines, as well as being part of the "Kiwiana" trend. He played Kahu in the short-film Kahu & Maia, a contemporary depiction of a Ngāti Kahungunu and Ngāti Rongomaiwahine legend. He played a seducer in the melodrama Desperate Remedies. In 2000 Curtis starred as family man Billy Williams in Jubilee, before playing father to the lead character in the international hit Whale Rider.

In 2004 with producer Ainsley Gardiner, Curtis formed independent film production company Whenua Films. The goals of the company are to support the growth of the New Zealand indigenous film-making scene, and support local short filmmakers. He and Gardiner were appointed to manage the development and production of films for the Short Films Fund for 2005–06 by the New Zealand Film Commission. They have produced several shorts under the new company banner, notably Two Cars, One Night, which received an Academy Award nomination in 2005, and Hawaikii by director Mike Jonathan in 2006. Both short films circulated through many of the prestigious international film festivals like the Berlinale.

At the 2006 Cannes Film Festival, Miramax Films bought US distribution rights to relationship comedy Eagle vs Shark, the first feature film directed by Taika Waititi. Waititi's follow-up feature Boy, also from Whenua Films, went on to become the highest grossing New Zealand film released.

In 2014, Curtis played the lead role in The Dark Horse, which the National Radio review called "one of the greatest New Zealand films ever made." The New Zealand Herald praised him for his "towering performance" as real-life Gisborne speed chess player and coach Genesis Potini, who died in 2011. Curtis studied chess and deliberately put on weight for the role.

=== International ===
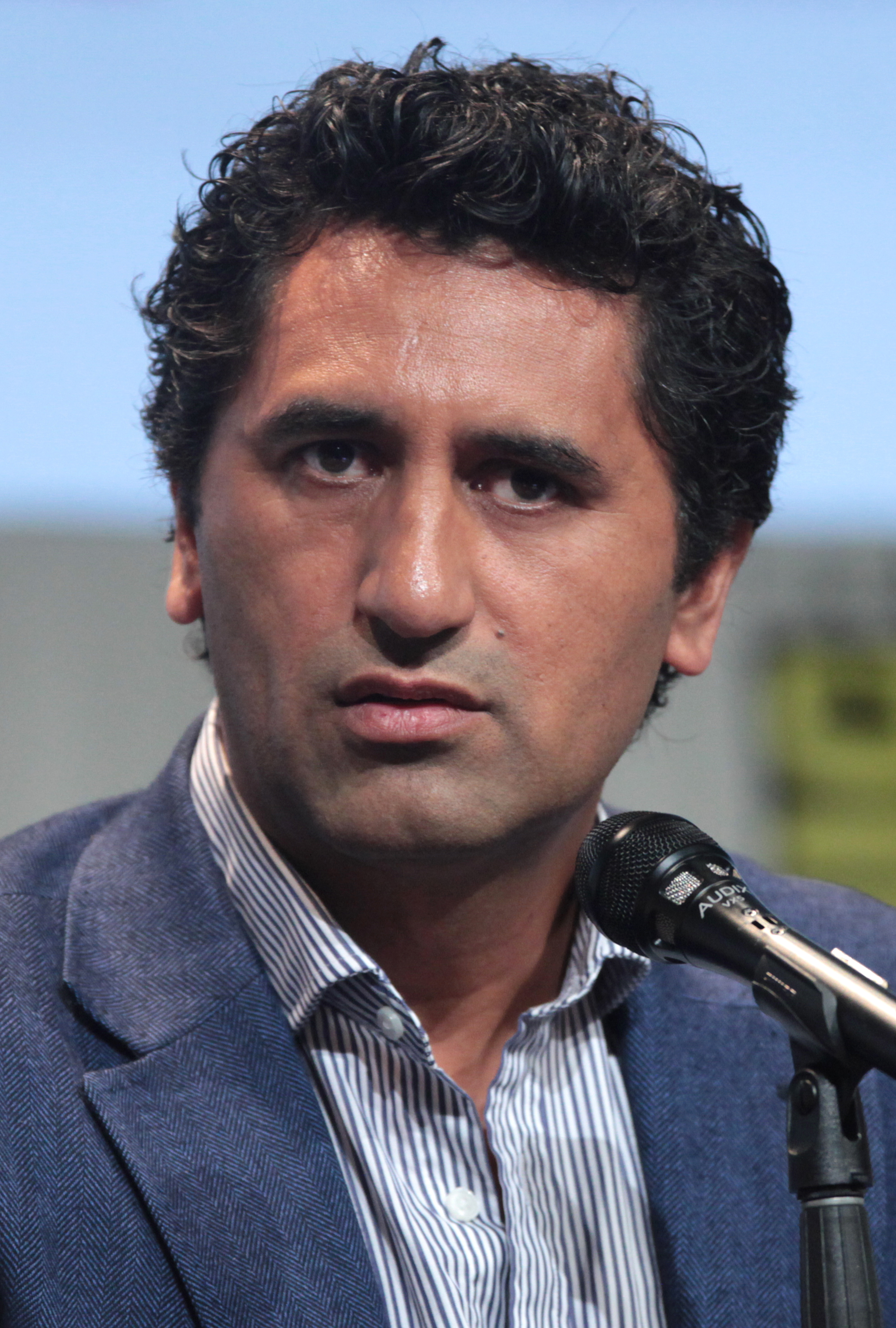
Curtis at the 2015 San Diego Comic-Con

Curtis has appeared in the films Martin Scorsese's Bringing Out the Dead (1999), Three Kings (1999), the drug drama Blow (2001) with Johnny Depp, Training Day (2001), Collateral Damage (2002) with Arnold Schwarzenegger, Live Free or Die Hard (2007), Sunshine (2007), Push (2009), “10,000 B.C.” (2008) the re-make, and Colombiana (2011). In M. Night Shyamalan's The Last Airbender (2010), he played the main villain, Fire Lord Ozai. Curtis portrayed Lt. Cortez in the film Last Knights (2015) and Jesus Christ in the film Risen (2016).

In the NBC TV drama Trauma, he played daredevil flight medic Reuben "Rabbit" Palchuck. Curtis was cast as Travis Manawa, a leading male role of the AMC TV series Fear the Walking Dead, the spin-off of The Walking Dead.

In 2017, Curtis was cast as Tonowari and is set to appear in the four sequels to Avatar, including Avatar: The Way of Water and Avatar: Fire and Ash.

In 2019, he played Jonah Hobbs, the brother of Luke Hobbs (Dwayne Johnson) in Fast & Furious Presents: Hobbs & Shaw; their characters are Samoan.

In 2023, Curtis starred in the Netflix film True Spirit, alongside Teagan Croft and Anna Paquin, based on the journey of Jessica Watson, a 16-year-old Australian sailor attempting a solo global circumnavigation. In 2024, Curtis starred in the Netflix series Kaos, as the Greek God Poseidon.

== Personal life ==
He was married in late 2009 in a private ceremony at his home, and has four children. He is Catholic.

When asked about being an "all-purpose ethnic" actor, he said, "It's been a real advantage, I love being ethnic, I love the colour of my skin. There are limitations in the business, that's a reality, but I've been given such wonderful opportunities."

In September 2026, Curtis was involved in a car accident in Auckland when he crashed into the back of a parked taxi. He was hospitalised with internal injuries, and three other people were taken to hospital, including one in a serious condition. Curtis was charged with reckless driving and driving with excess blood alcohol, and is due to appear in Auckland District Court.

== Filmography ==
Key
†	Denotes films that have not yet been released

=== Film ===
Year	Title	Role	Notes
1993	The Piano	Mana	
1993	Desperate Remedies	Fraser	
1994	Kahu & Maia	Kahu	
1994	Once Were Warriors	Uncle Bully	
1994	Rapa Nui	Short Ears	
1996	Chicken	Zeke	
1996	Mananui	Mana	
1998	Deep Rising	Mamooli	
1998	Six Days, Seven Nights	Kip	
1999	Virus	Hiko	
1999	Three Kings	Amir Abdulah	
1999	Bringing Out the Dead	Cy Coates	
1999	The Insider	Mohammad Hussein Fadlallah	Credited as 'Clifford Curtis'
2000	Jubilee	Billy Williams	
2001	Blow	Pablo Escobar	
2001	Training Day	"Smiley"	
2001	The Majestic	The Evil But Handsome Prince Khalid	
2002	Collateral Damage	Claudio "El Lobo" Perrini	
2002	Whale Rider	Porourangi	
2003	Runaway Jury	Frank Herrera	
2004	Fracture	Detective Franklin	
2004	Spooked	Mort Whitman	
2004	Heinous Crime	Pizza Delivery Man	
2005	The Pool	Husband	
2005	River Queen	Wiremu	
2006	The Fountain	Captain Ariel	
2007	Sunshine	Searle	
2007	Fracture	Detective Flores	
2007	Live Free or Die Hard	FBI Deputy Director Miguel Bowman	
2008	10,000 BC	Tic'Tic	
2009	Push	Hook Waters	
2009	Crossing Over	Hamid Baraheri	
2010	The Last Airbender	Fire Lord Ozai	
2011	Colombiana	Emilio Restrepo	
2012	A Thousand Words	Dr. Sinja	
2014	The Dark Horse	Genesis Potini	
2015	Last Knights	Lieutenant Cortez	
2016	Risen	Yeshua	
2018	The Meg	James "Mac" Mackreides	
2019	Fast & Furious Presents: Hobbs & Shaw	Jonah Hobbs	
2019	Doctor Sleep	Billy Freeman	
2021	Reminiscence	Cyrus Boothe	
2021	Murina	Javier	
2022	Muru	Sergent "Taffy" Tawharau	
2022	Avatar: The Way of Water	Tonowari	
2023	True Spirit	Ben Bryant	
2023	Meg 2: The Trench	James "Mac" Mackreides	
2024	Ka Whawhai Tonu	Wi Toka	
2025	Last Breath	Andre Jenson	
2025	Avatar: Fire and Ash	Tonowari	

=== Television ===
Year	Title	Role	Notes
1991	Undercover	Zip	Television film
1994	Hercules in the Underworld	Nessus	Television film
1995	Mysterious Island	Peter	2 episodes
1996	City Life	Daniel Freeman	4 episodes
1998	The Chosen	Father Tahere	Television film
2002	Point of Origin	Mike Camello	Television film
2004	Traffic	Adam Kadyrov	3 episodes
2004–2009	bro'Town	Himself	2 episodes
2009–2010	Trauma	Reuben "Rabbit" Palchuk	20 episodes
2011	Body of Proof	FBI Agent Derek Ames	2 episodes
2012	Missing	Agent Dax Miller	10 episodes
2014	Gang Related	Javier Acosta	13 episodes
2015–2017	Fear the Walking Dead	Travis Manawa	21 episodes
2016–2017	Talking Dead	Himself	3 episodes
2023–present	Invincible	Paul (voice)	12 episodes
2024	Swift Street	Robert	8 episodes
2024	Kaos	Poseidon	8 episodes
2025	Chief of War	Keōua	3 episodes (current release)
2026	Monarch: Legacy of Monsters	Jason Trissop	3 episodes

== Awards and nominations ==
Year	Award	Cagegory	Work	Result	Notes
1994	New Zealand Film and TV Awards	Best Performance in a Supporting Role: Male	Desperate Remedies	Won	
2000	New Zealand Film and TV Awards	Best Actor	Jubilee	Won	
2003	New Zealand Film and TV Awards	Best Supporting Actor	Whale Rider	Won	
2006	New Zealand Screen Awards	Best Performance by an Actor in a Leading Role	River Queen	Nominated	
2008	New Zealand Film and TV Awards	Best Picture - Budget over $1 Million	Eagles vs Shark	Nominated	Producer
2010	Asia Pacific Screen Awards	Best Children's Feature Film	Boy	Nominated	Producer
2011	Razzie Awards	Worst Screen Couple/Worst Screen Ensemble	The Last Airbender	Nominated	
2014	Asia Pacific Screen Awards	Best Performance by an Actor	The Dark Horse	Won	
2014	New Zealand Film and TV Awards	Best Actor	The Dark Horse	Won	
2015	Golden Space Needle Award	Best Actor	The Dark Horse	Won	
2015	Asian Film Festival Barcelona	Special Mention	The Dark Horse	Won	
2017	MovieGuide Awards	Most Inspiring Performance in Movies	Risen	Nominated	
2023	Septimius Awards	Best Oceanian Actor	Muru	Nominated	
2024	Asia Pacific Screen Awards	FIAPF Award for Outstanding Achievement in Film	N/A	Won	
2025	Red Nation Film Festival	Outstanding Performance by an Actor in Leading Role	In the Fire of War	Nominated	
