= Mitch Davis =

American film producer

- Education: Brigham Young University University of Southern California
- Occupations: Director, Producer, Writer
- Years active: 1989-present
- Notable work: The Other Side of Heaven; Christmas Eve
- Spouse: Michelle Davis
- Children: 4

Mitch Davis is an American film director, writer, and producer noted for his 2001 film The Other Side of Heaven about the trials and adventures of a missionary of the Church of Jesus Christ of Latter-day Saints (LDS Church), John H. Groberg. His movies range from intense dramas to lighthearted, family-friendly comedies. He has written seven films, directed five, and produced three. He is from Escondido, California. He attended Brigham Young University (BYU) and the University of Southern California.

== Personal life ==
Davis is a member of the LDS Church. He served as a missionary for the church in Córdoba, Argentina in the 1970s and received a bachelor's degree in English from Brigham Young University (BYU) in 1982. It was in an introduction to film class at BYU where Davis first watched It's a Wonderful Life, the film that showed him the impact movies could have on the lives of individuals. He described it as "a spiritual experience," saying that, after watching it, he "walked around campus in a daze...that movie just made me want to be a better person." His goal in film making is to uplift and inspire on a global scale. Davis later attended the University of Southern California and graduated with a Master of Arts degree in film production in 1989. He is married to Michelle Davis, and has two sons and two daughters.

== Professional career ==
After graduating from BYU, Davis first worked as a mainframe computer salesman. While attending graduate school, Davis worked as an intern at Disney. He went on to become a creative executive, working on films such as Dead Poet’s Society (1989), White Fang (1991), The Rocketeer (1991), and Newsies (1992). Davis wrote the screenplay for the Disney Channel film Windrunner (1994). He then worked as Vice President of Development of Columbia’s Cash & Epps Entertainment company.

While working as a screenwriter, Davis realized how much directors and producers could change his original work. He became a director and producer to ensure that his films would be released how he originally envisioned them. He explained: "That's how I became a filmmaker top to bottom; I was kind of backed into it."

Davis was struck by lightning while on a camping trip in Colorado. This near-death experience motivated him to begin production on The Other Side of Heaven. It was inspired by Groberg's book, In the Eye of the Storm. Davis and his family moved to the Cook Islands to make the film. There, Davis worked alongside producer Gerald R. Molen and John Garbett. It was released on December 14, 2001. More than three million copies of the film have been sold; about 200 million people worldwide have seen it. Davis stated that the film was "played in nearly every majority-Muslim country in the world."

After The Other Side of Heaven, he wrote and directed Language of the Enemy (originally entitled A House Divided), a story about an American Jewish man's travel to Israel and his subsequent romantic relationship with a Palestinian woman. Davis then wrote a three-part documentary series for BYUtv entitled Fires of Faith: The Coming Forth of the King James Bible, a historical piece featuring figures such as William Tyndale, Martin Luther, and King Henry VIII. He continued with BYUtv to write another documentary about Handel's Messiah in 2014. In 2015 he wrote, directed, and produced Christmas Eve, a family holiday comedy starring Sir Patrick Stewart. In 2017 he released The Stray, which showcased his own life experience. Davis co-wrote the PBS docudrama Joseph Smith: American Prophet in 2017, a remake of the 1999 film of the same name.

The Other Side of Heaven 2: Fire of Faith, a sequel to the previous film, was released on June 28, 2019. It is set 10 years after the original, and tells the story of Groberg's return to Tonga with his family.

Davis has released a book entitled Journey of Faith: The Making of the Other Side of Heaven, with Molen and Garbett as co-authors. The Other Side of Heaven: The Screenplay is also available.

== Filmography ==
=== Theatrical releases ===
Year	Film	Director	Producer	Writer	Starring
1994	Windrunner	No	No	Yes	Russell Means, Margot Kidder
2001	The Other Side of Heaven	Yes	No	Yes	Anne Hathaway, Christopher Gorham
2015	Christmas Eve	Yes	Yes	Yes	Patrick Stewart, Jon Heder, James Roday, Cheryl Hines, Gary Cole, Max Casella
2017	The Stray	Yes	Yes	Yes	Michael Cassidy, Sarah Lancaster
2019	The Other Side of Heaven 2: Fire of Faith	Yes	Yes	Yes	Christopher Gorham, Natalie Medlock, Ben Baker
2021	Witnesses	No	No	Yes	Michael Zuccola, Caleb J. Spivak, Lincoln Hoppe, Paul Wuthrich

=== Other releases ===
Year	Film/Series	Director	Producer	Writer	Starring
2010 (DVD)	Language of the Enemy	Yes	No	Yes	F. Murray Abraham, Eion Bailey, Linda Hardy
2011 (TV)	Fires of Faith: The Coming Forth of the King James Bible	No	No	No	(documentary series)
2014 (TV)	Handel's Messiah	No	No	Yes	(documentary)
2017 (TV)	Joseph Smith: American Prophet	No	No	Yes	Gregory Peck (narrator), John Foss, Anna Daines

== Awards and nominations ==
- Winner of the 2003 CAMIE (Character and Morality in Entertainment) Award for The Other Side of Heaven, along with Gerald R. Molen, John Garbett, John H. Groberg, Christopher Gorham, and Anne Hathaway.
- Finalist for the 2015 AML Award (film category) for Christmas Eve.
- Winner of the 2019 AML Award (narrative-feature-film category) for The Other Side of Heaven 2: Fire of Faith.
