= Vegas (New Zealand TV series) =

Action thriller New Zealand tv series

- Written by: Michael Bennett
- Starring: Cian Elyse White, Eds Eramiha, Katie Wolfe, Rena Owen
- Country of origin: New Zealand
- Original languages: English and te reo Māori

Production
- Producer: Harriet Crampton
- Production companies: Greenstone TV, 10,000 Company, Steambox Film Collective

Original release
- Network: TVNZ
- Release: March 2021

Vegas is a New Zealand drama television series which officially premiered on TVNZ 2 on 19 April 2021 at 8:30 pm. The series was released on TVNZ On Demand on the same date at 9:30 pm. Vegas was co-created by Michael Bennett and Harriet Crampton and produced by Greenstone TV, 10,000 Company, and Steambox Film Collective with support from NZ On Air and TVNZ Te Reo Tataki.

== Synopsis ==
The 6-part series is set in the fictional tourist town of Wairoto (a thinly anonymised Rotorua). A drug deal gone wrong on a blood-stained night sets off a chain of events for dangerous factions and an innocent bystander in this action-thriller series. Vegas stars Eds Eramiha (The Legend of Baron To’a), Cian Elyse White (Cousins), Katie Wolfe and Rena Owen (Once Were Warriors). Filmed entirely on location in Rotorua.

== Background ==
Vegas is the first mainstream television production in New Zealand to be helmed by a predominantly Māori cast and crew.

Vegas was the third-highest streamed show on TVNZ On Demand in 2021, reaching an average audience of 92.660 New Zealanders per episode. It then doubled that audience with its TVNZ 2 viewership.

Toro Studios created the title sequence Into The Flames composed by Mahuia Bridgman-Cooper, lyrics written and performed by Maaka Pōhatu and the Modern Māori Quartet, with additional performance by Awhimai Fraser and Te Ohorere Williams. Karyn Rachtman is the Music Supervisor.

The series is written by Michael Bennett, based on the novel Inside the Black Horse by Ray Berard.

Paul Lear won Best Post Production Design 2021 for Vegas.

== Cast ==
- Cian Elyse White as Toni Poulan
- Eds Eramiha as Kīngi Duncan
- Katie Wolfe as Hinapouri Phillips
- Rena Owen as Rāwina Duncan
- Te Kohe Tuhaka as Wiremu Poulan
- Jim Moriarty as Henry Ruata
- Alex Tarrant as Arsenio (Joe) Hamilton
- RickyLee Russell-Waipuka as Ruthie Hato
- Dahnu Graham as Junior Nepia
- Dean O'Gorman as Ryder Harrison
- Akinehi Munroe as Arihia Poulan
- Ezra Tapsell as Tyrone Wells
- Michelle Ang as Miranda Lau
- Evander Brown as Pio Duncan
- Kahukura Royal as Nikau Poulan
- Daniel Sing as Mike Young
- Xavier Horan as Mātia (Mātz) Phillips
- Miriama Smith as Annie Poulan
- Wayne Hapi as Waka Phillips
- Gary Young as Huàng Duc Minh
- Te Awarangi Puna as Erina Teuber
- Nathaniel Lees as George Smiley
- Vela Manusaute as Big Smiley
- Abi Turner as Felicity Carr-Fry

== Episodes ==
Episodes
No.	Title	Written by	Directed by	Billing	Original air date
1	Food for Worms	Michael Bennett	Kiel McNaughton	On a stormy night in Vegas a young leader makes a terrible decision that throws him into the path of a beautiful pub owner, and a desperate boy commits a crime that will change his life forever.	19 April 2021
2	Macbeth	Michael Bennett	Kiel McNaughton	Kīngi stakes out The Black Horse to get closer to Toni, but bigger forces are already moving against him.	26 April 2021
3	No Small Thing	Michael Bennett	Tim Worrall	Ari and Tyrone are hunted like animals and Mātz forces Kīngi to accept a new deal.	3 May 2021
4	Between Man and Beast	Michael Bennett	Mike Smith	Toni is on the path to truth as Kīngi loses his best friend and Hina and Ruthie get their revenge.	10 May 2021
5	Blue Smoke	Michael Bennett	Kiel McNaughton	Kīngi and Toni's worlds collide with devastating consequences.	17 May 2021
6	A Normal Life	Michael Bennett	Kiel McNaughton	Hina lives through a terrible trial while Kīngi risks everything on a throw of the dice.	24 May 2021
