= Tioreore Ngatai-Melbourne =

New Zealand actor

- Born: 21 October 1999 (age 26); East Coast, New Zealand
- Occupations: Actress; director; playwright
- Years active: 2016–present

Tioreore Ngatai-Melbourne (born 21 October 1999) is a New Zealand actress, director, and playwright. She made her acting debut in Hunt for the Wilderpeople (2016) and came to prominence for her role in The Convert (2023), for which she was named a Rising Star at the Toronto International Film Festival.

== Life and career ==
Ngatai-Melbourne was raised in Te Araroa, where she attended Te Kura Kaupapa Māori o Kawakawa mai Tawhiti, a Māori-language immersion school. She is affiliated with Ngāti Porou and Tūhoe iwi, and is fluent in Te Reo Māori. As a teenager, she starred in a minor role in Taika Waititi's 2016 film Hunt for the Wilderpeople, following a casting call across schools in the East Cape region. Since 2016, she has also starred in the period drama series Kairākau, produced by Whakaata Māori. In 2020, Ngatai-Melbourne graduated from Toi Whakaari, the national drama school of New Zealand, with a BA in acting. Following her graduation, she found starring roles as younger versions of main characters in both Cousins (2021) and Whina (2022). Ngatai-Melbourne made her directorial debut with the short film E Rangi Rā, which premiered at the 2022 Māoriland Film Festival. In 2023, she appeared in her most prominent role to date, as the daughter of a prominent rangatira in The Convert. The film premiered at the 2023 Toronto International Film Festival, where she was named a Rising Star. A play written by Ngatai-Melbourne, Out of the Ashes, premiered at the Kōanga Festival in 2023.

== Filmography ==
=== Film ===
Year	Title	Role	Notes
2016	Hunt for the Wilderpeople	Kahu	
2021	Cousins	Makareta	
2022	E Rangi Rā		Director; short film
2022	We Are Still Here	Te Mauniko	Anthology film
2022	Whina	Whina Cooper	
2023	The Convert	Rangimai	

=== Television ===
Year	Title	Role	Notes
2016–present	Kairākau	Ruamahu	Main role
2022	Mystic	Maia	Season 3
