= Christmas Eve (2015 film) =

- Theatrical release poster
- Directed by: Mitch Davis
- Written by: Mitch Davis; Tyler McKellar
- Produced by: Mitch Davis; Larry King; Shawn Southwick; Ken Bretschneider
- Starring: Patrick Stewart; Jon Heder; James Roday Rodriguez; Cheryl Hines; Max Casella; Julianna Guill; Shawn King; Gary Cole
- Cinematography: Ty Arnold
- Edited by: Danny Ramirez; Steven Ramirez
- Music by: Christian Davis
- Production company: Unstuck
- Distributed by: Amplify/GoDigital
- Release date: December 4, 2015
- Running time: 95 minutes
- Country: United States
- Language: English
- Box office: $91,302

Christmas Eve is a 2015 American Christmas comedy film, directed by Mitch Davis, written by Davis and Tyler McKellar, and produced by Davis and Larry King. The film features a large ensemble cast led by Patrick Stewart, James Roday Rodriguez, Julianna Guill, Jon Heder, Cheryl Hines, and Gary Cole.

Set in New York City, the film tells the stories of various characters as they become trapped in six different elevators on the titular evening. Released by Amplify and GoDigital on December 4, 2015, the film received universally negative reviews from critics and was a box-office bomb, grossing just $91,302 worldwide.

== Cast ==
- Patrick Stewart as Harris
- James Roday Rodriguez as B
- Julianna Guill as Ann
- Jon Heder as James Harris
- Cheryl Hines as Dawn
- Gary Cole as Dr. Roberts
- Christina Chong as Karen
- Max Casella as Randy
- Juliet Aubrey as Marta
- David Bamber as Walt
- Jenny Oaks Baker as Mandy
- Steve John Shepherd as Glen (as Steven John Shepherd)
- Lex Shrapnel as Tim
- Jaclyn Hales as Lila
- Clara Perez as Amelia

== Reception ==
Christmas Eve was panned by critics. On Rotten Tomatoes the film has an approval rating of 0%, based on 10 reviews, an average rating of 4.1/10. On Metacritic, it holds a score of 24 out of 100, based on 4 critics, indicating "generally unfavorable" reviews.

Joe Leydon of Variety wrote "Davis obviously aims to indicate a grand design to seemingly random events, and the presence of a higher power — probably God — capable of affecting human destinies." He further noted, "the movie can serve as undemanding home-screen amusement to enjoy while wrapping Christmas presents."

Jared Whitley of the Star Trek fan site Trek Movie gave the film "3 out of 4 lights," noting that "Patrick Stewart fans will no doubt remember his iconic role as Ebeneezer Scrooge in A Christmas Carol and will be happy to know that Stewart brings plenty of that regal Scrooge-ness to his role in Christmas Eve." He further noted that all the characters "have the kind of amazing cathartic experiences that can only happen in movies when you’re trapped in elevator with strangers."

The film was nominated for an AML Award.

== See also ==
- List of Christmas films
