= The Other Side of Heaven =

2001 adventure drama film by Mitch Davis

- Theatrical release poster
- Directed by: Mitch Davis
- Screenplay by: Mitch Davis
- Based on: In the Eye of the Storm by John H. Groberg
- Produced by: Gerald R. Molen
- Starring: Christopher Gorham; Anne Hathaway; Joseph Folau; Nathaniel Lees; Miriama Smith; Alvin Fitisemanu; Pua Magasiva
- Cinematography: Brian J. Breheny
- Edited by: Steven Ramirez
- Music by: Kevin Kiner
- Production companies: Excel Entertainment Group; 3Mark Entertainment; Molen/Garbett Productions
- Distributed by: Buena Vista Home Entertainment
- Release date: December 14, 2001
- Running time: 113 minutes
- Country: United States
- Languages: English; Tongan
- Budget: $7 million
- Box office: $4.8 million

The Other Side of Heaven is a 2001 American adventure drama film written and directed by Mitch Davis, based on John H. Groberg's first autobiography, In the Eye of the Storm. The film stars Christopher Gorham as John Groberg and Anne Hathaway as Jean Groberg (née Sabin).

The film showcases Groberg's experiences as a missionary of the Church of Jesus Christ of Latter-day Saints (LDS Church) in the Tongan islands in the 1950s.

== Plot ==
During the 1950s, John Groberg (Gorham) graduates from Brigham Young University and is called on a 3-year mission to Tonga. Throughout the film, Groberg and his fiancée, Jean (Hathaway), exchange letters monthly. After a long journey across the Pacific, Groberg arrives in Tonga and is sent to a group of very remote islands. He is assigned a native Tongan companion, Feki (Joe Folau). As a new missionary, he struggles with learning the language; he studies it intensely and learns more about Tongan culture.

Groberg encounters a number of obstacles in his mission. One night, he forgets instructions to cover his feet, and rats bite his soles while he is asleep. A local Christian minister warns the people not to listen to Groberg and Feki. Later, he sends four men to beat them. However, one of the men, Tomasi, prevents the attack. Groberg learns from the drunken Tomasi that he had been baptized a member of the LDS Church many years ago as a boy. Tomasi later begins attending church meetings. When a young boy falls out of a mango tree and becomes unconscious, Groberg gives him basic first aid and prays for him. When a young woman, at the behest of her family, attempts to seduce Elder Groberg, he responds by teaching her about marriage. A typhoon destroys trees, homes, and crops. People die in the storm, and many die due to starvation and dehydration. Groberg is close to dying himself when the local minister gives him the last of his food. After the supply boat finally arrives, the minister is found dead. Later, while traveling at sea, Groberg and his two counselors are caught in a large storm. He is washed overboard and fears for his life. He swims until he finds an island where he also locates his counselors, and they are later rescued and return to Tonga.

Groberg returns to his hut one day to find that his mission president has come to visit the island. He is unhappy because he has not heard from Groberg since he came to the island many months prior. Groberg describes some of the success they have experienced, and the president is shocked to learn of new branches and meeting places on outer islands that have not been authorized. Groberg and his counselors spend the entire night filling out the church records the president requested. In the morning, he finds the president is about to board a boat, and gives him a large sheaf of forms documenting all they have accomplished. When his time as a missionary comes to an end, Groberg receives a telegram instructing him to return to New Zealand from where he will travel to Idaho Falls, Idaho. When he is ready to depart, many islanders gather in their best clothing to see him off, testifying to the impact he has had during his stay. Once he arrives in Idaho, he marries Jean and the two spend their honeymoon in a cottage by a beach.

== Cast ==
- Christopher Gorham as John H. Groberg
- Anne Hathaway as Jean Sabin
- Joe Folau as Feki
- Nathaniel Lees as Kelepi
- Miriama Smith as Lavinia
- Alvin Fitisemanu as Tomasi
- Pua Magasiva as Finau
- John Sumner as President Stone

== Production ==
=== Development ===
Director Mitch Davis was inspired by John H. Groberg's autobiography, In the Eye of the Storm, and wanted to tell Groberg's story via film. Deseret Book (at the time, Bookcraft) owned the rights, and the company wanted to ensure that Davis captured the "spirit of the book". John Groberg consented for the movie to be made after meeting Davis, and then the rights were secured. Producer Gerald R. Molen is noted for his work on films such as The Color Purple, Schindler's List, and The Lost World: Jurassic Park. The film's budget was $7 million.

=== Casting ===
Christopher Gorham was cast in the lead role as John Groberg. Mitch Davis selected him after auditioning "hundreds and hundreds of actors on both coasts" because Gorham exhibited "a little light in his eyes", according to Davis. He has since become a common name in Mormon cinema, appearing in other LDS roles with films such as We Love You, Sally Carmichael! and the sequel to Heaven, where he reprises the role of John Groberg. Anne Hathaway was cast as Jean Groberg (née Sabin). Hathaway stated that she liked how the character of Jean was committed to Groberg but lived her own life. Before filming her parts of Heaven in New Zealand, she auditioned for The Princess Diaries.

=== Filming ===
The real John and Jean Groberg gave feedback on the script. Jean Groberg provided Davis with the letters she and John exchanged, and they were used in filming the scenes where John and Jean write to one another.

The film was shot on location in Auckland, New Zealand and the island of Rarotonga, capital of the Cook Islands. All of the filming equipment and necessary supplies had to arrive by boat. The island scenes were completed in two months. In both Rarotonga and Auckland, rain often threatened to delay shoots, but Davis claimed that his prayers delayed much rain while filming.

== Release ==
Disney distributed The Other Side of Heaven. After Hathaway was cast for the lead role in Disney's 2001 movie adaptation of The Princess Diaries, distribution of The Other Side of Heaven was delayed until after The Princess Diaries released in the hopes that the latter's anticipated success would boost the former.

The film opened theatrically on December 14, 2001, in two venues, earning $55,765 in its opening weekend, ranking number 41 in the domestic box office. By the end of its run, almost a year later, on December 2, 2002, the film grossed $4,720,371 domestically and $39,643 overseas for a worldwide total of $4,760,014.

== Critical reception ==
On the review aggregation website Rotten Tomatoes, The Other Side of Heaven has a 30% approval rating based on 40 reviews, with an average rating of 4.70/10. The site's consensus states: "The Other Side of Heaven preaches to the converted; others will likely consider it simplistic, even offensive, propaganda." On Metacritic, the film has a 38 out of 100 rating based on 16 critics, indicating "generally unfavorable reviews".

Professor of literature Terryl Givens noted that the film doesn't mention Groberg's faith or explain why he is serving his mission. He speculates that this could be an effort to "universalize the message of Christian service and spiritual coming of age".

== Sequel ==
In February 2018, Davis announced that filming was starting for a sequel titled The Other Side of Heaven 2: Fire of Faith. Gorham, Folau, Lees, and Smith reprised their roles from the first film. Natalie Medlock played Jean Groberg, replacing Hathaway. The movie was based on Groberg's second autobiographical novel, with the same title, set ten years after the first film. The story follows John returning to the island with his wife and five daughters during the period of time he served as an LDS Church mission president. It was released June 28, 2019. On Rotten Tomatoes the film has an approval rating of 71% based on reviews from 7 critics.

== Sources ==
- Astle, Randy; Burton, Gideon O. (2007). "A History of Mormon Cinema". Brigham Young University Studies. 46 (2): 12–163. JSTOR 43045073.
- Cartlidge, Cherese (2013). Anne Hathaway. People in the News. Lucent Books, a part of Gale, Cengage Learning. ISBN 978-1-4205-0751-5.
