= Cian Elyse White =

New Zealand actress

- Born: 1988 (age 37–38); Rotorua, New Zealand
- Occupation: Actress
- Years active: 2011–present

Cian Elyse White is a New Zealand actress. She is best known for playing Toni Poulan in the drama series Vegas and Hannah in the comedy drama series 800 Words.

== Early life ==
White was born in Rotorua, New Zealand. She attended St Michael's Primary School and John Paul College before getting an art degree at Toi Whakaari. Her first major performance out of drama school was in Bruce Mason's Awatea, a study of Māori rural communities in the 50s and 60s. She shared the stage with theatre veteran George Henare who reprised the role he played in the original 1968 production.

== Career ==
In 2011 her play Hear to See won Most Original Production at the Chapman Tripp Theatre Awards. She played Leanne in a one off appearance in the drama series The Blue Rose. Her first big role came playing Hannah in the comedy drama series 800 Words. For her performance she was nominated for a Logie Award. She made her directing debut in 2019 with the short film Daddy’s Girl/Kōtiro and followed it up in 2021 with another short film called PIIKSI/Huia. Both films represented Te Ao Māori and wāhine Māori on-screen. She played Toni Poulan, one of the lead characters in the drama series Vegas. She portrayed the adult version of Gloria in the film Cousins.

== Personal life ==
She is the founder of Māori production company, WAITĪ Productions. She is a huge fan of singers Ella Fitzgerald, Dorothy Moore, Sam Cooke, The Hi-Marks, The Inkspots and Kenny Rogers.

== Filmography ==
=== Film ===
Year	Title	Role	Notes
2013	Fantail	Kapa Haka Girl	Short
2017	Meke	Rita	Short
2021	Cousins	Adult Gloria	

=== Television ===
Year	Title	Role	Notes
2011	Underbelly NZ: Land of the Long Green Cloud	Andy	3 episodes
2013	The Blue Rose	Leanne	Episode; Paint a Vulgar Picture
2015	Tatau	Lara Morgan	8 episodes
2015-2018	800 Words	Hannah	39 episodes
2018	The Brokenwood Mysteries	Chontelle	2 episodes
2021	Vegas	Toni Poulan	6 episodes
2021	My Life Is Murder	Nicki Balodis	Episode; Ghost Town Tricks
2022	Moe & Friends	Narrator	
2022	Beyond the Veil	Manaia	Episode; Te Kohu-The Mist
