= Cousins (2021 film) =

- Poster
- Directed by: Ainsley Gardiner; Briar Grace-Smith
- Based on: Cousins by Patricia Grace
- Produced by: Ainsley Gardiner; Georgina Conder; Libby Hakaraia
- Edited by: Alex Boyd
- Music by: Warren Maxwell
- Production company: Miss Conception Films
- Distributed by: Vendetta Films; ARRAY
- Release date: 3 March 2021
- Running time: 98 minutes
- Country: New Zealand
- Language: English

Cousins is a 2021 New Zealand film directed by Ainsley Gardiner and Briar Grace-Smith. It is an adaptation of the 1992 novel of the same name by Patricia Grace.

== Plot ==
The film is told through flashbacks spread across Mata's childhood and current life.

At a young age, Mata is sent by her Pākehā (European) father to the Mercy Home for Desolate Children. There, she is renamed May Parker and grows up ignorant of her Māori culture, language, and family.

When a Māori staff member at the Mercy Home recognises Mata as a member of the Pairama clan, Mata is allowed to spend the summer with her "grandparents". Following a train journey to Rotorua, she meets her Aunt Gloria and cousins Missy and Makareta, who expose her to her Māori culture and heritage. Mata also learns that her Māori mother did not abandon her as her father had claimed but that he had taken her from her mother. Mata is shocked to learn that her grieving mother had died the previous year, still longing to see her lost daughter.

Although Gloria and her cousins want to adopt her into the Pairama clan, Mrs Parker, the guardian appointed by her father, objects to it. As a result, Mata is separated from her Māori relatives and grows up into an extremely repressed young woman who is ashamed of her Māori background, brown skin, and curly hair. Following a failed marriage to a young Māori man named Sonny, Mata falls into depression and becomes homeless in the streets of Wellington.

Meanwhile, Makareta flees an arranged marriage to study law in Wellington. Missy takes the role of the guardian of the Pairama clan's land, which is locked in a dispute with property developers. As adults, Makareta and Missy resolve to find their lost cousin Mata. After years of searching, Makareta and Mata reunite following a chance encounter in Wellington. Makareta tells Mata that she will bring her back to the land and their home, but passes away shortly after. Mata returns to the Pairama lands with Makareta's body and has an emotional reunion with Missy. The film ends with Mata and Missy sitting by Makareta's casket.

== Cast ==
- Mata
  - Tanea Heke as Old Mata
  - Ana Scotney as Adult Mata
  - Te Raukura Gray as Little Mata
- Missy
  - Rachel House as Old Missy
  - Hariata Moriarty as Adult Missy
  - Keyahne Patrick Williams as Little Missy
- Makareta
  - Briar Grace-Smith as Old Makareta
  - Tioreore Ngatai-Melbourne as Adult Makareta
  - Mihi Te Rauhi Daniels as Little Makareta
- Sylvia Rands as Mrs Parkinson
- Jean
  - Chelsie Preston Crayford as Adult Jean
  - Gina Laverty as Young Jean
- Gloria
  - Emily Skerrett as Oldest Gloria
  - Cian Elyse White as Adult Gloria
- Bobby
  - Jim Malcolm as Oldest Bobby
  - Cohen Holloway as Adult Bobby
- Miriama Smith as Keita
- Erroll Anderson as Tipi
- Jim Moriarty as Māori Caregiver
- Sonny
  - Kirk Torrance as Oldest Sonny
  - Niwa Whatuira as Adult Sonny
- Calvin Tuteao as Hamuera

== Production ==
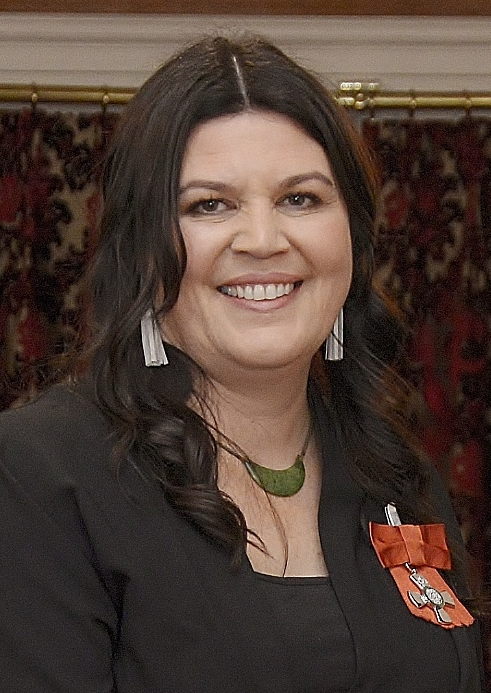
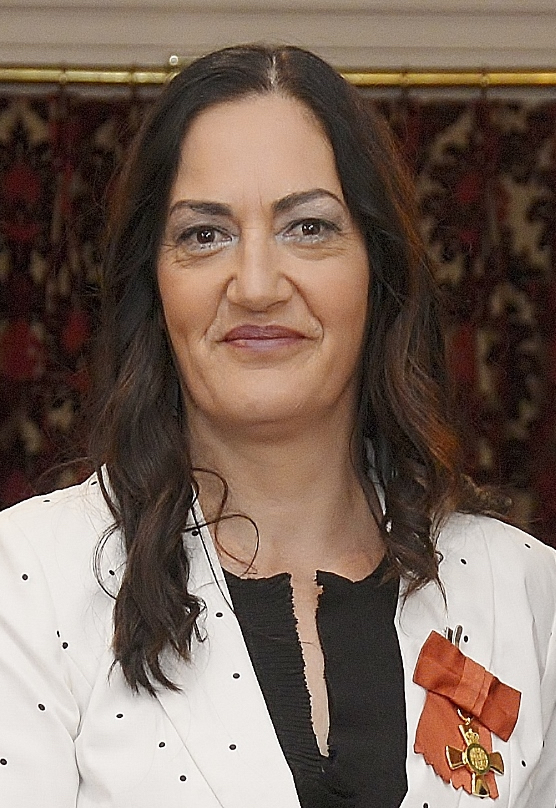
Directors Gardiner (left) and Grace-Smith (right) on 25 September 2018

Cousins was directed by Ainsley Gardiner and Briar Grace-Smith. Gardiner, Georgina Conder and Libby Hakaraia served as producers. Music was composed by Warren Maxwell. It is an adaptation of the 1992 novel Cousins by Patricia Grace. The film was produced by Miss Conception Films. Cousins was filmed in Rotorua and Wellington.

== Distribution ==
Cousins was distributed in New Zealand by Vendetta Films, and premiered on 3 March 2021 at the Reading Cinema in Rotorua. The decision to host the premiere in Rotorua was made because several Rotorua shooting locations are featured in the film and casting was conducted in the city. The film earned NZ$1,000,000 at the New Zealand box office in its first three weeks.

ARRAY acquired the rights to distribute Cousins in North America, the United Kingdom, and the Republic of Ireland. Cousins was released in United States movie theatres on 2 July and on Netflix on 22 July.

== Reception ==
The review aggregator website Rotten Tomatoes surveyed 21 critics and, categorising the reviews as positive or negative, assessed all 21 as positive for a 100 percent rating. Among the reviews, it determined an average rating of 8.50 out of 10. The New York Times's Devika Girish said the film "trembles with sound, color and feeling, deriving much of its power from an excellent ensemble cast".

Stuff reviewer James Croot praised the film for its "compelling narrative, evocative sense of space and place and terrific performances", awarding it four and half stars. He credited the main cast members with bringing the three protagonists Mata, Makareta and Missy to life, saying Rachel House, Tanea Heke and Ana Scotney particularly impressed " while bright futures await the likes of Mihi Te Rauhi Daniels, Keyahne Patrick Williams and Te Raukura Gray, based on this evidence". Croot praised the directors Ainsley Gardiner and Briar Grace-Smith for their immersive style of filming, which in his view brought the viewer into the world of the story. He also gave a favourable appraisal of Gardiner, Grace-Smith and casting director Tinary's decision to have three sets of actors playing the main protagonists at different stages of their life.

For Australian Book Review, critic Tahney Fosdike praised directorial interest in the intergenerational care of Indigenous women, compared to other trans-Tasman recent releases High Ground (2021) and Nightingale (2018) which gave more stage time to violent white antagonists straining First Nations family bonds.

Variety's reviewer Alissa Simon praised Grace-Smith's screen-play as a faithful adaptation of her mother-in-law Patricia Grace's novel. She also gave a favourable appraisal of cinematographer Raymond Edwards's use of close-up photography for depicting the world of the Pairama clan. Simon also praised editor Angela Boyd's non-linear storytelling of the three main protagonists' lives over a period of fifty years from the late 1940s to the 1990s. Simon also credited composer Warren Maxwell's musical score and incorporation of Māori songs for immersing viewers in Māori. She also likened Cousins to other films such as the Australian Rabbit-Proof Fence and Swedish Sámi Blood, which raised awareness of the hurt suffered by indigenous "stolen generations", who were uprooted from their families.
