= Michael Bennett (film director) =

New Zealand writer and filmmaker

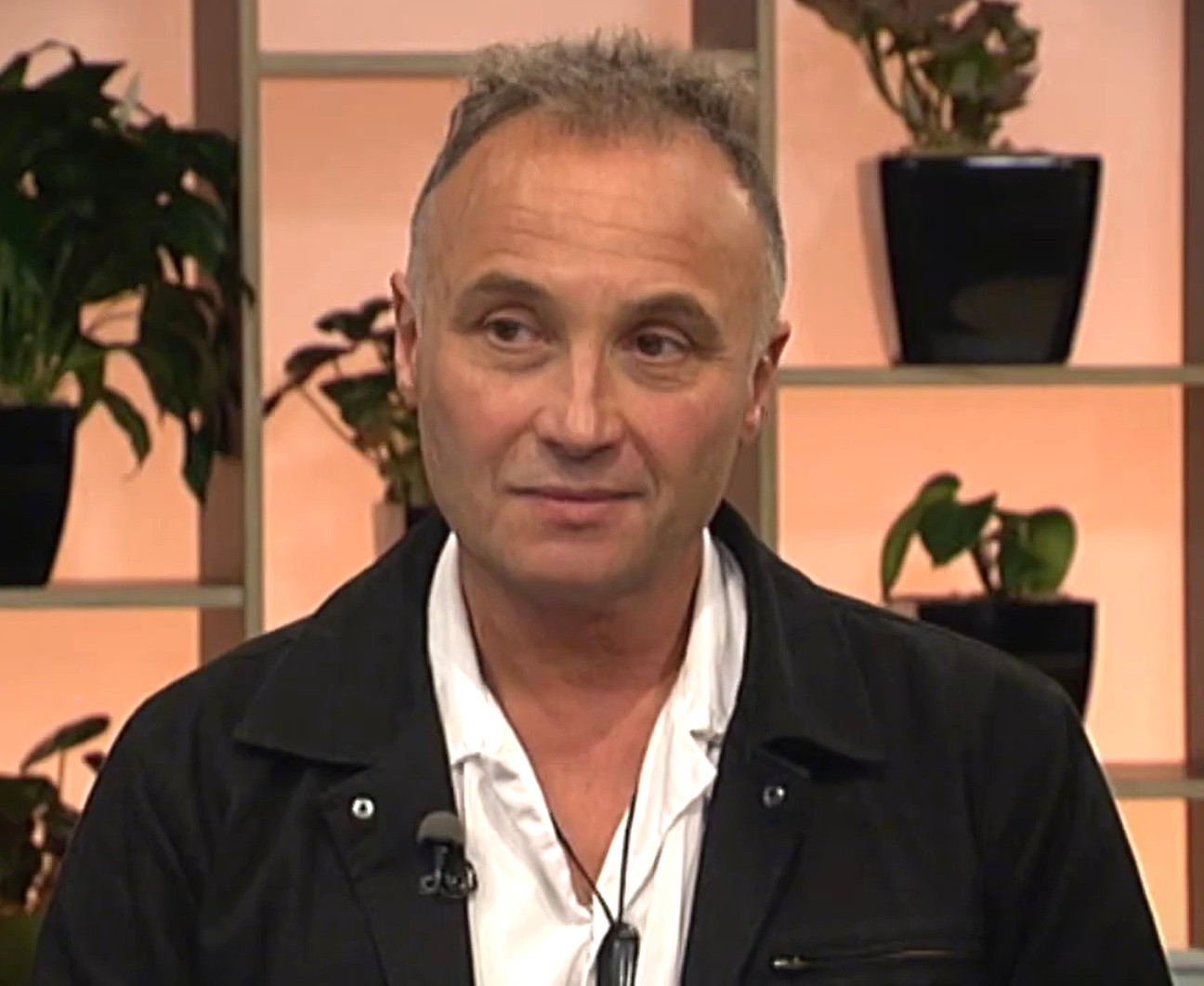
- Bennett in 2018
- Born: Michael Te Arawa Bennett; Reefton, New Zealand
- Occupations: Director, writer
- Years active: 1994 – present

Michael Te Arawa Bennett is a New Zealand writer, scenarist, author and director for film and television.

== Career ==
Bennett is the co-creator, writer, show-runner and executive producer of TVNZ's Vegas.

He is also the author of In Dark Places, a study of the wrongful conviction of Teina Pora for the 1992 murder of Susan Burdett, which won the 2017 Ngaio Marsh crime writing award. His 2022 crime novel, Better the Blood, was shortlisted for the Jann Medlicott Acorn Prize for Fiction at the 2023 Ockham New Zealand Book Awards and for the Best Novel at the 2023 Ngaio Marsh Awards. Return to Blood, the second novel featuring detective, Hana Westerman, was longlisted for the 2025 Ngaio Marsh Best Novel.

== Personal life ==
Bennett is Maori and is of Te Arawa descent. He resides in Auckland with his partner and three children, and is the head of screenwriting at South Seas Film School.

Bennett is a cousin of actor Manu Bennett.

== Partial filmography ==
- Michelle's Third Novel (1994) (writer, short film)
- Street Legal (2000) (writer, TV serial)
- Cow (2002) (writer and director, short film)
- Kerosene Creek (2004) (writer and director, short film)
- The Lost Children (2006) (writer, TV serial)
- Maddigan's Quest (2006) (writer, TV serial)
- Outrageous Fortune (2005–2007) (writer and director, TV serial)
- Matariki (2010) (writer and director, feature film)
- In Dark Places (2018) (writer and director, TV film)
- Vegas (2021) (writer and producer, TV serial)
- The Convert (2023) (writer, film)

== Bibliography ==
- In Dark Places (2016, true crime book) - Won the Ngaio Marsh Award for Best Non Fiction
- Helen and the Go-Go Ninjas (2019, graphic novel illustrated by Ant Sang)
- Better the Blood (2022, first in the Hana Westerman series of crime novels) - Won the Ngaio Marsh Award for Best First Novel, and also nominated for Best Crime Novel
- Return to Blood (2024, second Hana Westerman novel)
- Carved in Blood (2025, third Hana Westerman novel)
