= The Convert =

2023 drama film by Lee Tamahori

- Theatrical release poster
- Directed by: Lee Tamahori
- Screenplay by: Shane Danielsen; Lee Tamahori
- Story by: Michael Bennett
- Based on: Wulf by Hamish Clayton
- Produced by: Robin Scholes; Te Kohe Tuhaka; Andrew Mason; Troy Lum
- Starring: Guy Pearce; Tioreore Ngatai-Melbourne; Antonio Te Maioha; Jacqueline McKenzie; Lawrence Makoare
- Cinematography: Gin Loane
- Edited by: Luke Haigh
- Music by: Matteo Zingales
- Production companies: Jump Film & Television; Brouhaha Entertainment
- Distributed by: Kismet Movies (Australia and New Zealand); Vertigo Releasing (United Kingdom)
- Release dates: 7 September 2023 (TIFF); 14 March 2024 (New Zealand); 20 June 2024 (Australia)
- Running time: 119 minutes
- Countries: Australia; New Zealand; United Kingdom
- Languages: English; Māori
- Box office: $689,814

The Convert is a 2023 historical drama film directed by Lee Tamahori, and starring Guy Pearce, Tioreore Ngatai-Melbourne and Te Kohe Tuhaka. The script for the film was written by Tamahori and Shane Danielsen from a story by Michael Bennett based on the 2011 novel Wulf by Hamish Clayton. It is an international co-production between New Zealand, Australia and the United Kingdom.

The Convert premiered at the 2023 Toronto International Film Festival on 7 September 2023. The film was released in New Zealand on 14 March 2024 and in Australia on 20 June 2024. It was also Tamahori's final film before his death on 7 November 2025.

== Plot ==
In 1830, Thomas Munro, a lay minister from Britain, arrives in New Zealand on a storm-stricken ship and, during a clash between two Māori tribes, intercedes on behalf of Rangimai, a young daughter of Maianui, the chieftain (rangatira) of the one tribe, to save her from being killed by the warriors of Akatarewa, rangatira of the other tribe, trading his horse with Akatarewa in return for her life. Having been delivered to a British settlement called Epworth, where Munro is to perform missionary work, he becomes Rangimai's religion tutor in Christianity.

Although the settlers live on the land of Maianui's tribe under agreement with the tribe, Rangimai and Pahirua, a young Māori warrior left by Maianui with Rangimai for his daughter's protection and to assist her in religious studies, face discrimination and prejudice from the rest of the settlement. Pahirua is surreptitiously murdered and Munro refuses to report to Maianui the cover story made by the settlers. He advises Maianui however to raise the rent the people of Epworth pay to his tribe, instead of taking any punitive action against the settlers; he then teaches the Māori warriors a faster way of loading a flintlock musket. In the tribe's wharenui at a gathering of the elders, Munro tells them about his past as a soldier in the British Army, a charge which he led against what was believed to be an enemy stronghold which turned into a massacre of innocent women and children in a school, and about his subsequent spiritual quest for redemption for his actions.

In an attempt to negotiate reconciliation between the two tribes, Munro sails to Akatarewa's land in the same British ship that brought him to New Zealand. Akatarewa rejects Munro's peace overtures and his warriors capture the ship, with a consignment of muskets onboard, in order to use the ship's artillery in a decisive clash with Maianui's tribe. Munro joins in that final battle on Maianui's side, whose warriors defeat Akatarewa's tribe. Maianui executes Akatarewa; in order to achieve lasting peace between their tribes, Rangimai agrees to marry Akatarewa's son, whose life Maianui has spared.

Four years later, Munro, with a tā moko on his face, acts as a counsellor to the combined Māori tribe in their negotiations with a British delegation seeking to establish a Customs & Excise post at Epworth.

== Cast ==
- Guy Pearce as Thomas Munro
- Te Kohe Tuhaka
- Tioreore Ngatai-Melbourne as Rangimai
- Antonio Te Maioha as Maianui
- Jacqueline McKenzie as Charlotte
- Lawrence Makoare as Akatarewa
- Dean O'Gorman as Kedgley
- Madeleine McCarthy as Bethany
- Duane Evans Jr. as Pahirua

== Production ==
A joint production between Auckland-based Jump Film & Television and Australia's Brouhaha Entertainment from Sydney, the film was produced by Robin Scholes, Te Kohe Tuhaka, Andrew Mason and Troy Lum; with Bradford Haami serving as its executive producer and Ngamaru Raerino acting as a Māori cultural consultant.

Principal photography commenced in September 2022 on the North Island. Filming locations included West Auckland beaches, Studio West, and other locations around the Auckland and Northland regions. Filming was reported to have wrapped by November 2022.

Funding for the film came from the New Zealand Film Commission and the New Zealand Premium Production Fund, with the British distribution company Mister Smith Entertainment handling the sales of the film worldwide, and Mikhail Khodorkovsky's London-based production company MBK Productions presenting it.

== Release ==
The Convert premiered at the Toronto International Film Festival on 7 September 2023.

The film was released in New Zealand cinemas on 14 March 2024, followed by a release in Australia on 20 June 2024.

== Reception ==
=== Box office ===
As of 31 July 2024, The Convert grossed $350,877 in New Zealand (from 109 cinemas) and $268,249 in Australia (97 cinemas). Limited theatrical release in the United States and Canada generated $5,263 from 20 cinemas. In Russia, the revenue from screening the film in 267 cinemas was $68,942.

=== Critical response ===
On the review aggregator website Rotten Tomatoes, 82% of 17 critics' reviews are positive, with an average rating of 6.5/10. Metacritic, which uses a weighted average, assigned the film a score of 65 out of 100, based on 12 critics, indicating "generally favorable" reviews.

The Post's Graeme Tuckett gave The Convert a mixed review, praising the film's screenplay, cinematography and the performances of the cast members, but finding the middle part of the story to be "muddled and unnecessary."

The Spinoff's Tommy de Silva gave a sympathetic review, praising the film for its acting, well-choreographed fight scenes, integration of the Māori language and authentic depiction of 1830s New Zealand society. Although criticising some minor historical inaccuracies around the depictions of Wharenui (Māori communal meeting houses) and stereotypical portrayal of Māori characters as violent, vengeful cannibals and Pakeha characters as "greedy, money-obsessed and power-hungry", he summarised his review of the film: "It may not be perfect, but it’s worth a watch... Capturing a chapter from [New Zealand's] past rarely before seen in local popular culture makes The Convert a must-see for both period-piece purists and New Zealand history nerds alike."
