= Filthy Rich (2016 TV series) =

New Zealand television series

- Genre: Comedy drama
- Created by: Rachel Lang; Gavin Strawhan
- Directed by: Peter Burger; Michael Duignan; Oliver Driver; Kiel McNaughton
- Starring: Miriama Smith; Emma Fenton; Taylor Hall; Alex Tarrant; Josh Mckenzie; Luciane Buchanan; Elizabeth Hawthorne; Shushila Takao
- Composer: Leon Radojkovic
- Country of origin: New Zealand
- Original language: English
- No. of seasons: 2
- No. of episodes: 33

Production
- Executive producers: Rachel Lang; Gavin Strawhan; Peter Burger
- Producer: Steven Zanoski
- Cinematography: Dave Cameron; Grant McKinnon
- Editors: Paul Sutorius; Cushla Dillon; Gary Hunt; Angela Boyd
- Camera setup: Multi-camera
- Production company: Filthy Productions

Original release
- Network: TVNZ 2
- Release: 15 February 2016 – 4 October 2017

Filthy Rich is a New Zealand comedy drama television series created by Rachel Lang and Gavin Strawhan. It premiered on 15 February 2016 on TVNZ 2. The show revolves around three illegitimate half siblings who discover they have a claim to a fortune to one of the wealthiest men in New Zealand, John Truebridge. When he dies these unwanted heirs stand to share in his legacy but not if his legitimate family has anything to do with it.

== Production ==
On 28 May 2015 it was announced by The New Zealand Herald that the country's most expensive tv show had started filming. The show was granted NZ$8.25M by the New Zealand government agency, NZ On Air.

The show premiered on 15 February 2016.

On 26 July 2016, it was announced the show was renewed for a second season and was granted a further NZ$6.9M in funding from NZ On Air. On 13 June 2017 a promo was released for the second season on the show's official Facebook page.

The second season premiered on 11 July 2017.

On 15 December 2017 it was announced via the show's official Facebook page that the show did not get renewed for a third season.

== Plot ==
After John Truebridge, one of the wealthiest men in New Zealand, commits suicide, it is revealed that John has three illegitimate children: Joe, Savannah, and Garth. His son John Jnr is not thrilled that he now has to share his father's fortune.

== Cast and characters ==
=== Main ===
- Miriama Smith as Brady Truebridge, second wife of John Truebridge. A former hairdresser from Gisborne now head of one of the country's largest corporations after her husband's death.
- Josh McKenzie as John Truebridge Jnr, son of John Truebridge who is a handsome, but also arrogant 30-year-old man. He has an addiction to gambling, drugs, and call girls. Doesn't like how he now has to share his father's fortune.
- Alex Tarrant as Joe Tamatoa, 24 year old illegitimate son of John Truebridge who was raised in a caring family. Recently found out that his entire life was a lie when he learns that he was adopted after being found in a rubbish bin as an infant.
- Emma Fenton as Savannah Fielding, 20 year old illegitimate daughter of John Truebridge. She is a pole dancer at her mother's boyfriend's club, who knows that she is the daughter of a rich man but was shut out of her birthright by Brady.
- Taylor Hall as Zac Bryce, Zac poses as his best friend Garth Joster, who is John's other illegitimate son. Garth was put on life support following a car crash.
- Elizabeth Hawthorne as Nancy Truebridge, John's sister. She adores Brady and her daughter, Kennedy, but loathes John's first wife, Vivian.
- Luciane Buchanan as Kennedy, Brady's 15-year-old daughter
- Shushila Takao as Ariana, Joe's fiance
- Xana Tang as Cherry, Brady's assistant
- Mike Edward as Fisher Brankovic, works for Brady at the Truebridge Hunt Corporation

=== Recurring ===
- Theresa Healey as Vivian Hunt Trubridge, John's ex-wife and mother to John Jnr
- Cristina Serban Ionda as Maria, Brady's maid
- Jay Simon as Alan Griever, Minister/Politician
- Tania Anderson as Gillian Joster, Garth's mother
- Jodie Rimmer as Lorna Fielding, Savannah's mother
- Erroll Shand as Karl Reichman, Lorna's boyfriend
- Simon Prast as Sir Douglas, Executive Chair of Truebridge Hunt Corporation's board
- Becky McEwan as Grace Halloway, Kennedy's school friend
- Joe Folau as Snake, gang member financing Karl's club
- Emily Robins as Toni Van Asch, PR consultant friend of John Jnr
- Jared Turner as Sam Halloway, Grace's father
- Siobhan Page as Roxy van Buren, Savannah's friend working at the club
- Nick Davies as Garth Joster, the real Garth
- Mark Mitchinson as Lloyd Maxwell, rival businessman of John Snr
- Bonnie Soper as Annabelle Maxwell, Lloyd's socialite daughter
- Kirk Torrance as Ariki Campbell, Brady's ex and Kennedy's biological father
- Jay Saussey as Megan Campbell, Ariki's wife
- Matthew Walker as Ford Hathaway, John Jnr's friend
- Katrina Browne as Caroline Brankovich, Fisher's wife

== Episodes ==
=== Season 1 (2016) ===
No. overall	No. in season	Title	Directed by	Written by	Original release date
1	1	"Other Natural Children"	Peter Burger	Rachel Lang & Gavin Strawhan	15 February 2016
Three illegitimate children discover they each have a claim to the fortune of one of New Zealand's wealthiest men. With so much money on the line, John's legitimate family will do anything to stop these new, unexpected heirs!
2	2	"Welcome to the Family"	Peter Burger	Gavin Strawhan & Rachel Lang	16 February 2016
After losing her husband, Brady Truebridge is left to deal with his three illegitimate children. But as she sets out to kill with kindness, John Jnr sets his sights on a new conquest.
3	3	"A Little Payback"	Michael Duignan	Rachel Lang & Gavin Strawhan	22 February 2016
John Jnr has a change of tactic and plays nice to win over Joe, but Brady plays dirty, with devastating consequences for Savannah's mum Lorna.
4	4	"Is Not Thy Wickedness Great"	Michael Duignan	Gavin Strawhan	23 February 2016
Savannah is desperate to help her mum, but angers a powerful enemy in the process. Brady suspects treachery and sets a trap for a blackmailer, and John Jnr tempts Joe with secrets and vice.
5	5	"The Rich Never Share"	Oliver Driver	Rachel Lang	29 February 2016
Revelations force Brady to rethink her husband's death and Joe regrets his indecent actions from the night before. But as more details unfold, he could be one step closer to finding his birth mother.
6	6	"Friends in High Places"	Oliver Driver	Deborah Hill Cone & Rachel Lang	1 March 2016
John Jnr is playing a double game and seeks out his notorious mother, Vivian. Savannah's boardroom triumph is quickly undercut and Brady sends Cherry on an indecent mission.
7	7	"To Justice"	Peter Burger	Sam Shore & Gavin Strawhan	7 March 2016
Vader worries for Savannah as she starts to put a deadly plan in motion. Vivian confronts Nancy over the secret of Joe's past.
8	8	"An Unholy Alliance"	Peter Burger	Rachel Lang	8 March 2016
Vader deflects his feelings for Savannah, as Joe gets shock news about his mother. Kennedy's night out leads her into danger.
9	9	"Dangerous People"	Michael Duignan	Gavin Strawhan	14 March 2016
Joe's life spirals out of control and he takes refuge with John Jnr. Savannah returns to the club to hand over more cash to Karl, but a confrontation has dangerous consequences.
10	10	"What Better Revenge"	Michael Duignan	Gavin Strawhan	15 March 2016
Vader helps Savannah cover her tracks, as Brady gets a message from beyond the grave. Joe realises he's made a deal with the devil.
11	11	"The Obvious Line of Enquiry"	Oliver Driver	Gavin Strawhan	21 March 2016
Brady is in over her head as the evidence stacks up against her. Meanwhile, Joe takes drastic action to break free from John Jnr.
12	12	"All Things Decent"	Oliver Driver	Sam Shore & Gavin Strawhan	22 March 2016
John Jnr sets his sights on a new target and Savannah pieces together the clues to discover who framed Brady.
13	13	"In the Money"	Peter Burger	Deborah Hill Cone & Rachel Lang	28 March 2016
Brady discovers John Snr may have more hidden secrets and Grace reveals her true feelings to a shocked Kennedy. Joe makes a play for power that lands him in bed with a new temptress.
14	14	"An Advantageous Match"	Peter Burger	Rachel Lang	29 March 2016
Joe continues his love affair while John Jnr comforts a distraught Ariana. Evidence emerges about Karl's death that will have devastating consequences...
15	15	"Scores to Settle"	Michael Duignan	Rachel Lang	4 April 2016
Savannah heads to the police station to confess. Joe realises that he and Annabelle might have a stalker. A blast from Vader's past threatens to out his true identity.
16	16	"New Blood"	Michael Duignan	Deborah Hill Cone & Rachel Lang	5 April 2016
Brady tries to pull Savannah back from the dark side as she continues her path of self-destruction. John Jnr pulls out all the stops to seduce Ariana.
17	17	"Warrior Stock"	Oliver Driver	Sam Shore & Gavin Strawhan	11 April 2016
Savannah continues on her path of self-destruction as Brady enlists the help of Fisher to save her. Joe receives a bombshell from Toni; and John Jnr may finally have his wicked way with Ariana.
18	18	"Bully, Blackmail, Bribe"	Oliver Driver	Rachel Lang	12 April 2016
Joe and John Jnr face off over Ariana, as Joe gets unexpected news. Kennedy's entrapment plot comes disastrously unstuck.
19	19	"Judas in Your Midst"	Peter Burger	Gavin Strawhan	18 April 2016
Joe tries to win back Ariana as John Jnr makes an extreme proposal. Brady and John Jnr form a new alliance, but treachery in the boardroom has shocking consequences.
20	20	"Everything I've Done"	Peter Burger	Rachel Lang	19 April 2016
Brady uncovers information that sends shock-waves throughout the family. The truth about John Truebridge Snr's death is revealed, and one life is left hanging in the balance.

=== Season 2 (2017) ===
No. overall	No. in season	Title	Directed by	Written by	Original release date
21	1	"Talk of the Town"	Peter Burger	Sam Shore, Gavin Strawhan, Rachel Lang	11 July 2017
Vader vows to avenge Savannah, as Brady hits the comeback trail. John Jnr uses blackmail to his advantage, as Joe's loyalties are tested.
22	2	"Big Fat Fibs"	Kiel McNaughton	Sam Shore	18 July 2017
Vengeance comes at a price for Vader. Birthday gifts lead to temptation for Kennedy. John Jnr swallows more than his pride.
23	3	"Compliant and Grateful"	Kiel McNaughton	Gavin Strawhan	25 July 2017
Kennedy takes to the road in search of her father. John makes a sacrifice in a noble cause. Brady uses all her ammunition to keep the cuckoos in line.
24	4	"Fortune Favours the Brave"	Kiel McNaughton	Rachel Lang	1 August 2017
Savannah conspires with an old foe to undermine Brady. Newly successful John Jnr tries to resist old temptations. Meanwhile, Brady gets an unlikely admirer.
25	5	"Good in a Crisis"	Oliver Driver	Deborah Hill Cone	8 August 2017
Joe's baby news threatens to land him in hot water. Savannah knows who her champions are, but can she be with the one she loves?
26	6	"What the Lady Wants"	Oliver Driver	Jess Sayer	15 August 2017
Brady has big demands - but finds a bigger enemy in Malia. A name and shame campaign pays off for Kennedy. Ariana is keeping a secret, as Savannah ices a nemesis.
27	7	"Local Connection"	Kathy McRae	Gavin Strawhan	22 August 2017
Fisher's plans force Brady back to family - to confront her past and present. And Joe's family connections bring a world of trouble.
28	8	"Champion of the People"	Kathy McRae	Rachel Lang & Gavin Strawhan	29 August 2017
In the wake of tragedy, there's a fight for justice. Vader fights for the maiden, and Savannah vows to kill a killer.
29	9	"One Rule for the Rich"	Michael Duignan	Sam Shore	5 September 2017
Joe pays a price to keep his son. Brady hits Fisher where it hurts, and John receives miraculous bounty.
30	10	"Fight Dirty"	Michael Duignan	Gavin Strawhan	12 September 2017
Brady clashes with Ariki as Kennedy reveals all online. Vader finds a jealous ex has plans for destruction. Ariana and Annabelle go head to head - and the gloves are off.
31	11	"Unfinished Business"	Christopher Dudman	Gavin Strawhan	19 September 2017
Ariana and Joe have unfinished business, but shock news leads to heartbreak. Brady launches an assault on Fisher, which leads to killer consequences.
32	12	"A Lesson in Loyalty"	Christopher Dudman	Jess Sayer	26 September 2017
Kennedy finds that her nearest might not be her dearest. Joe finds his mother has big plans. John works the angles - only to end up as a target.
33	13	"All the Little Bombs"	Harry Sinclair	Rachel Lang & Gavin Strawhan	3 October 2017
Brady vanquishes her foes, only to find there are traps. Joe makes a romantic declaration, as John is a hero. Savannah's triumph turns to betrayal.

== International airings ==
In May 2016, it was announced that Hulu had purchased the series for streaming in the United States.

== American remake ==
In October 2017, it was announced that the American television network Fox had commissioned a pilot for a U.S. remake of the show. Tate Taylor (The Help, The Girl on the Train), Imagine Entertainment, and 20th Century Fox Television are behind the remake. In December 2018, Fox had greenlit the series for the 2019–20 television season, and was picked up in May 2019. Kim Cattrall serves as producer and star in the series. It was set to premiere in spring 2020 but was delayed to September 21, 2020 due to COVID-19. In October 2020, the series was cancelled after one season.
