= Tatau (TV series) =

- Genre: Drama
- Created by: Richard Zajdlic
- Written by: Richard Zajdlic
- Starring: Joe Layton; Theo Barklem-Biggs; Barry Atsma
- Composer: Karl Steven
- Country of origin: United Kingdom
- No. of seasons: 1
- No. of episodes: 8

Production
- Executive producer: Rob Pursey
- Production locations: Cook Islands; Auckland
- Cinematography: Dale McCready
- Running time: 38 minutes
- Production companies: Touchpaper TV; South Pacific Pictures

Original release
- Network: BBC Three
- Release: April 12 – May 17, 2015

Tatau is a British drama television series that premiered on BBC Three on 12 April 2015. The programme is a supernatural murder mystery set in the Cook Islands. The series consists of 8 episodes.

== Cast ==
- Joe Layton as Kyle Connor
- Theo Barklem-Biggs as Pete 'Budgie' Griffiths
- Barry Atsma as Dries
- Shushila Takao as Aumea Vaipiti
- Temuera Morrison as Anaru Vaipiti
- Cian Elyse White as Lara
- Alexander Tarrant as Maui Vaipiti
- Tai Berdinner-Blades as Tyler
- Kirk Torrance as Reverend Calcott
- Aruna Po-Ching as Patea Vaipiti

== Critical reception ==
The critical reception to Tatau has been generally negative. The Philadelphia Inquirer called it "must-miss" television, a "weak show" with an "incredibly annoying hero" and The Daily Telegraph's Isabel Mohan called the show "grating", "tedious" and "far-fetched". Brian Lowry of Variety was more ambivalent, saying that it "works as a modest mystery/picturesque travelogue, provided one can get past the hackneyed premise and almost complete lack of character establishment... a mildly watchable thriller, assuming viewers don't dwell too much on the white-savior-in-exotic-locale undertones."
