= The Other Side of Heaven 2: Fire of Faith =

The Other Side of Heaven 2
- Directed by: Mitch Davis
- Screenplay by: Mitch Davis
- Based on: The Fire of Faith by John Groberg
- Produced by: Mitch Davis; Steven A. Lee
- Starring: Christopher Gorham; Natalie Medlock; Ben Baker; Alex Tarrant
- Cinematography: T.C. Christensen
- Music by: Christian Davis
- Production companies: Kolipoki Pictures; BYU TV; Two Roads Productions
- Distributed by: Excel Entertainment Group
- Release date: June 28, 2019
- Running time: 117 minutes
- Box office: $1,807,216

The Other Side of Heaven 2: Fire of Faith is a 2019 adventure biography drama film directed by Mitch Davis. It is the sequel to the 2001 film The Other Side of Heaven. Heaven 2 continues the story of John H. Groberg, who returns to the islands of Tonga, where he served as a missionary for The Church of Jesus Christ of Latter-day Saints ten years prior. This time he is a mission president for the Church of Jesus Christ of Latter-day Saints. He brings his family along: his wife, Jean Groberg (née Sabin), and their five daughters.

The film stars Christopher Gorham as Kolipoki and Natalie Medlock (replacing Anne Hathaway from the first film) as Jean Groberg. It is based on Groberg's second autobiography The Fire of Faith.

== Plot ==
In the 1960s, ten years after the original Heaven film, John Groberg (Gorham) is tasked with being president of the Tonga–Fiji mission for The Church of Jesus Christ of Latter-day Saints. He returns to the islands where he served as a young missionary, this time with his wife, Jean Groberg (Medlock), and their five daughters. While the Grobergs begin their new life in Tonga, native Tongan minister Sione (Baker) learns that his son, Toutai (Tarrant), plans to be baptized into the Church and serve as a missionary himself. Sione is infuriated, and becomes determined to curb the missionaries' success on the island. He buries Toutai neck-deep in sand on a beach while a storm out at sea threatens his life. His brother attempts to dig him out, but is struck by lightning in the process. Toutai miraculously survives.

Jean gives birth to a sixth child, a son who is born severely sick. The baby is too ill to leave Tonga to receive the necessary medical attention. People bring her gifts and fruit while she is in the hospital. In the same hospital Sione's son receives care while in a coma. The fathers put aside their differences and console one another as their sons suffer.

== Cast ==
- Christopher Gorham as John H. Groberg
- Natalie Medlock as Jean Groberg
- Ben Baker as Viliami 'Sione' Paletu'a
- Alex Tarrant as Toutai Paletu'a
- Joe Folau as Feki
- Nathaniel Lees as Kelepi
- Miriama Smith as Lavania
- Peter Sa'ena-Brown as Kuli
- Russell Dixon as Thomas S. Monson

== Production ==
Production began on Heaven 2 almost seventeen years after the release of the original film in 2001. Writer and director Mitch Davis had previously refused to do a sequel because he wished to avoid making a "10-cent imitation" of The Other Side of Heaven. He later conceded after a conversation with John Groberg, in which Groberg told Davis that the late president of the LDS Church, Thomas S. Monson, wished for both of Groberg's autobiographies to become movies. Davis's hesitation was further alleviated when he discovered that the nation of Fiji would offer a 47% "tax rebate or film incentive rebate" for movies made in Fiji.

Even with this financial help, the filming of Heaven 2 was difficult; both Cyclone Josie and Cyclone Keni hit the crew's filming location. Most of the original cast returned, but Natalie Medlock replaced Anne Hathaway as Jean Groberg due to budget constraints. Russell Dixon was cast to portray President Monson; the actor was chosen for his likeness to the Latter-day Saint leader. Christopher Gorham of Ugly Betty and Covert Affairs returns to play the lead role.

== Release ==
Heaven 2 was released on June 28, 2019, in theaters in the U.S. It made $454,257 at its opening and grossed $1,807,216 in total. It was released among titles such as Toy Story 4 and Spider-Man: Far From Home. Director Mitch Davis purposefully released Heaven 2 during such a competitive time to demonstrate that "this kind of movie can perform against that kind of competition." It was the top faith film at the box office when released. According to the film's official website, it is rated PG-13 due to "two action scenes" and "one relatively mild beat-up scene".

== Critical reception ==
On the review aggregator website Rotten Tomatoes, 71% of 7 critics' reviews are positive. Deseret News's Josh Terry wrote that Heaven 2 "leaves audiences with a much more thoughtful examination of its subject". Two of Rotten Tomatoes Top Critics — from Variety and also from RogerEbert.com — gave the film mostly negative reviews. RogerEbert.com's review stated "Purely from a production-value standpoint, the sequel is more accomplished than most faith-based movies, and that includes its 2001 predecessor" along with "...Christopher Gorham once again exhibits a likable, everyman screen presence as Elder John H. Groberg". Variety's review said "Mitch Davis' 'The Other Side of Heaven II: Fire of Faith' is as tedious as rush-hour traffic and as bland as a communion wafer". Sean Means of The Salt Lake Tribune called it "a quietly powerful story of the healing power of community and faith".

The film won the 2019 AML Award for narrative feature film.
