= The Stray (film) =

2017 film by Mitch Davis

- Directed by: Mitch Davis
- Screenplay by: Mitch Davis; Parker Davis
- Produced by: Mitch Davis
- Starring: Michael Cassidy; Sarah Lancaster
- Cinematography: T. C. Christensen
- Edited by: Marshal Davis
- Music by: Christian Davis
- Production company: Keb Entertainment
- Distributed by: Purdie Distribution
- Release date: October 6, 2017 (US)
- Running time: 92 minutes
- Country: United States
- Language: English
- Box office: $1.6 million

The Stray is a 2017 American drama family film directed by Mitch Davis and written by Mitch and Parker Davis. The film stars Michael Cassidy and Sarah Lancaster.

== Plot ==
A young father takes his nine-year-old son, the family dog, and two of his son's friends backpacking in the mountains of Colorado only for all five of them to be struck by lightning. The story of how a stray dog, Pluto, comes out of nowhere and impacts the Davis family, who are struggling in many ways. In just a short time, Pluto the Wonderdog manages to save a toddler, bring comfort and companionship to a hurting 9-year-old boy, help restore a marriage, and repair a broken father-son relationship. Pluto is not only a guard dog - he is a guardian angel.

== Cast ==
- Michael Cassidy as Mitch Davis
- Sarah Lancaster as Michelle Davis
- Connor Corum as Christian Davis; Corum's first acting role was in Heaven Is for Real (2014)
- Jacque Gray as Misty Davis
- Enoch Ellis as Clark LaCouture
- Brennin Williams as Justin 'Smitty' Smith
- Scott Christopher as Dave Smith
- Shiloh as Pluto

== Reception ==
The Stray received negative reviews from critics. On review aggregator Rotten Tomatoes, the film has a rating of 40%, based on 10 reviews, with an average rating of 5.1/10.

Sheri Linden of the Los Angeles Times stated, "The drama preceding that real-life footage, is an underpowered, white-bread sermon on the importance of family and faith". Sandie Angulo Chen of Common Sense Media rated the film 2 out of 5 stars stating, "Faith-based family drama could distress dog lovers". Roger Moore of Movie Nation gave the film 1.5 stars out of 4 stating, "The Stray never rises to the level of maudlin".
