= Hunt for the Wilderpeople =

2016 film by Taika Waititi

- New Zealand theatrical release poster
- Directed by: Taika Waititi
- Screenplay by: Taika Waititi
- Based on: Wild Pork and Watercress by Barry Crump
- Produced by: Carthew Neal; Matt Noonan; Leanne Saunders; Taika Waititi
- Starring: Sam Neill; Julian Dennison; Rhys Darby; Rima Te Wiata; Rachel House
- Cinematography: Lachlan Milne
- Edited by: Luke Haigh; Tom Eagles; Yana Gorskaya
- Music by: Lukasz Buda; Samuel Scott; Conrad Wedde
- Production companies: Defender Films; Piki Films; Curious; New Zealand Film Commission
- Distributed by: Madman Films and Piki Films
- Release dates: 22 January 2016 (Sundance); 31 March 2016 (New Zealand)
- Running time: 101 minutes
- Country: New Zealand
- Language: English
- Budget: US$2.5 million
- Box office: US$23.2 million

Hunt for the Wilderpeople is a 2016 New Zealand adventure comedy film produced, written and directed by Taika Waititi, based on the 1986 novel Wild Pork and Watercress by Barry Crump. Sam Neill and Julian Dennison star as "Uncle" Hector and Ricky Baker: a father figure and foster son who become the targets of a manhunt after fleeing into the New Zealand bush.

Hunt for the Wilderpeople premiered at the Sundance Film Festival on 22 January 2016. The film opened across New Zealand on 31 March 2016. Grossing US$23.2 million, it remains the highest-grossing New Zealand film excluding international co-productions. The film received critical acclaim, with many critics praising Dennison and Neill's performances and chemistry.

== Plot ==
Ricky Baker, a child in the New Zealand foster care system who has frequently run away or been let go by other foster homes, is taken in by Bella and her husband Hector. Though Hector remains distant from Ricky, interested only in hunting, Ricky grows close to Bella. When she suddenly dies of a stroke, Hector is informed that Ricky will be relocated by state services, represented by the agent Paula Hall.

Not wanting to return to the foster care system, Ricky sloppily fakes his own death, accidentally burning down Hector and Bella's shed, and runs off into the bush. Hector goes after him, and in the process, injures his ankle. The two are forced to remain in the bush until Hector's ankle heals. Meanwhile, Paula finds the wreckage at Bella and Hector's farm and claims that Hector has kidnapped Ricky, launching a nationwide manhunt for the pair.

After a period of time, Hector's ankle has mostly healed, and the pair find a hut in the bush. They see their pictures in a newspaper article about the manhunt before they are suddenly discovered by three hunters returning to the hut. Hector and Ricky manage to escape – but, due to Ricky's innocent and ignorant nature, he accidentally suggests Hector has molested him. The manhunt intensifies and Ricky becomes nationally recognised.

While wandering around together, Ricky and Hector warm up to each other, with Ricky telling him about his fears and anxieties concerning the foster care system. When they enter an empty hut again for more supplies, they find a park ranger suffering from a diabetic attack. Hector remains with the man whilst Ricky goes down to a nearby town for help. He finds a young girl Kahu and her father, who recognise him but do not turn him into the authorities.

Ricky becomes smitten with Kahu, and accidentally falls asleep and stays the night. By the time he reaches the hut the next morning, it is surrounded by police and Hector has fled. When facing Paula across a gully she tries to bribe him, asking him to say that Hector was a sex offender in return for not going to juvenile detention. However, he declines and catches up with Hector. Hector's reputation has improved for helping the ranger, as the media changes their view of him.

When Ricky and Hector are reunited, however, they rob the same hunters as before, causing his public image to decline again. Later, the pair are attacked by a wild boar. In the attack, Hector's dog Zag is wounded, forcing Hector to shoot him. After his burial, Ricky reveals that he has been carrying Bella's ashes, so they scatter them into a waterfall high in a mountain range.

A man named Psycho Sam, who is living on his own, is discovered by Ricky and Hector. He permits them to stay overnight. After five months of survival in the wild and numerous near misses, they are eventually found due to Sam connecting Ricky's mobile to the internet. The pair are apprehended while trying to escape in "Crumpy", Sam's red 1980s Toyota Hilux, and Ricky unintentionally shoots Hector.

Hector is sent to prison for around a year, whilst Ricky stays with Kahu and her father. After his release, they reunite and continue their life of adventure.

== Cast ==
- Sam Neill as Hector Faulkner, Ricky's foster "uncle" and Bella's husband
- Julian Dennison as Ricky Baker, Hector and Bella's foster child
- Rima Te Wiata as Bella Faulkner, Ricky's foster "aunt" and Hector's wife
- Rachel House as Paula Hall, a child welfare worker
- Rhys Darby as Psycho Sam
- Oscar Kightley as Andy, a police officer
- Stan Walker as Ron
- Tioreore Ngatai-Melbourne as Kahu
- Troy Kingi as TK
- Mike Minogue as Joe
- Cohen Holloway as Hugh, leader of the hunters
- Taika Waititi as the Minister for Bella's funeral

== Production ==
Waititi first began to adapt the book in 2005, and completed multiple different drafts. The early drafts stayed true to the book. However, later versions departed from it in several ways. Julian Dennison was cast by Waititi from earlier work they did together on a commercial.

The film had a budget of approximately NZ$4.5 million, of which $2 million came from the New Zealand Film Commission.

The film was shot over 5 weeks, on locations including the Central Plateau, Ahuroa and the Waitākere Ranges. Almost the entire film was shot using a single camera.

== Music ==
Hunt for the Wilderpeople (Original Motion Picture Soundtrack)

Soundtrack album by Moniker
- Released: 9 April 2016
- Genres: Soundtrack, Electronic, Rock
- Length: 40:52
- Label: Majestical Production
- Producer: Moniker

The soundtrack was composed by Moniker and was released on 8 April 2016 by Majestical Pictures Ltd. All original songs were written and performed by Moniker unless specified.

No.	Title	Length
1.	"Makutekahu" (vocals by Pepe Becker, Anna Sedcole, Phillip Collins, Robert Oliver)	2:09
2.	"Ricky Runs"	1:46
3.	"Cloak of the Sky"	2:58
4.	"Ricky Baker Birthday Song" (vocals by Rima Te Wiata and Julian Dennison)	0:51
5.	"Tupac"	0:59
6.	"Ricky Alone"	1:10
7.	"Ocean Blue" (vocals by Moniker)	2:26
8.	"All the Nummiest Treats"	1:36
9.	"Hunting/Raindrops"	2:37
10.	"Are You Lost?"	2:53
11.	"Ancient Stones"	1:10
12.	"Horseriding"	1:26
13.	"Kahu's House"	2:43
14.	"Forest Spirit"	4:14
15.	"Majestical"	2:52
16.	"Crumpy"	1:26
17.	"Milestone 2 (Skux Life)" (vocals by Moniker)	2:57
18.	"Sycamore"	1:56
19.	"Trifecta" (co-written by Rima Te Wiata (as R Te Wiata), Taika Waititi (as T. Waititi), Julian Dennison (as J. Dennison) and Sam Neill (as S. Neill))	2:52
Total length:		40:52

=== Other soundtrack ===
- "Fraulein Love" by Space Waltz (used only in trailer)
- "Magic (What She Do)" by DD Smash
- "Sinnerman" by Nina Simone
- "The Partisan" by Leonard Cohen
- "Shchedryk" by Choeur d'enfants du Bolchoï
- "Cadbury Flake jingle" arranged by Moniker
- "Turn Your Lights Down Low" arranged by Tioreore Ngatai-Melbourne
- "The Ole Rugged Cross" (un-credited)
- "Seabird" by Alessi Brothers (closing credits)

== Release ==
The film premiered at the 2016 Sundance Film Festival on 22 January 2016 and was released in cinemas on 31 March 2016 in New Zealand by Piki Films and Madman Entertainment. The film opened in Australian cinemas on 26 May 2016 and received a limited theatrical release in North America on 24 June 2016. The film was released on DVD and Blu-ray in North America on 25 October 2016 by Sony Pictures Home Entertainment.

== Reception ==
=== Box office ===
The film grossed NZ$1,263,000 in New Zealand on its opening weekend, the highest grossing opening weekend for a New Zealand film (as defined by the New Zealand Film Commission), ahead of What Becomes of the Broken Hearted?'s $912,000 record in 1999.< (Note: While the films of The Lord of the Rings and The Hobbit trilogies had higher grossing opening weekends, they do not meet the definition of a New Zealand film per the New Zealand Film Commission Act 1978.) It went on to gross NZ$12 million.

Internationally, as of October 2016, the film has grossed A$10,935,319 in Australia, US$507,380 in the UK and US$5,137,201 in North America.

=== Critical response ===
On Rotten Tomatoes, Hunt for the Wilderpeople received a score of 97%, based on 201 reviews, with an average rating of 7.9/10. The site's critical consensus reads: "The charmingly offbeat Hunt for the Wilderpeople unites a solid cast, a talented filmmaker, and a poignant, funny, deeply affecting message." On Metacritic, the film has a score of 81 out of 100, based on 30 reviews, indicating "universal acclaim".

In his review, Hamish Popplestone remarked: "Though both flawed, Neill's and Dennison's characters are so, so charming on-screen and are fully apt at weaving through the dramatic, comedic, and sad points of the script." Empire magazine named Hunt for the Wilderpeople the number one film for 2016.
