= Relative Chaos =

2006 television film by Steven Robman

Relative Chaos is a 2006 television film directed by Steven Robman and starring Christopher Gorham and Nicholas Brendon. It was first broadcast on ABC Family on September 4, 2006. The film score was composed by Danny Lux.

== Premise ==
At an annual family reunion, the youngest of three siblings attempts to win a family athletic competition called the Gilbert Cup and beat his siblings for the first time.

== Cast ==
- Christopher Gorham as Dil Gilbert
- Nicholas Brendon as Gil Gilbert
- Terry Bradshaw as Will Gilbert
- Charisma Carpenter as Katherine

== Reception ==
Common Sense Media rated the film 3 out of 5 stars. The website The Movie Scene stated: "It won't be for everyone because we are talking an inoffensive ABC Family Production but if innocent and inoffensive is what you are after it will probably amuse."
