= Shushila Takao =

New Zealand actress and model (born 1986)

Shushila Takao (born 4 November 1986) is a New Zealand actress and model, best known for her roles in television series such as Tatau, Filthy Rich, and The Shannara Chronicles.

== Early life ==
Takao was born in Christchurch and raised in Nelson. She is of Māori, Indian, and French descent.

== Career ==
In 2015, Takao played her first major television role as Aumea Vaipiti on the series Tatau. The show was set in the Cook Islands and consisted of 8 episodes. She went on to be cast as Ariana in the New Zealand based television drama series Filthy Rich. She played the role of The Changeling on the American-based television series The Shannara Chronicles.

== Filmography ==
=== Film ===
Year	Title	Role	Notes
2012	Sione's 2: Unfinished Business	Polynesian Angel	
2013	Evil Dead	Stand-in	
2014	The Last Saint	Danger	

=== Television ===
Year	Title	Role	Notes
2015	Tatau	Aumea Vaipiti	
2016	Filthy Rich	Ariana	
2016	The Shannara Chronicles	Changeling	
