= Alex Tarrant =

New Zealand actor

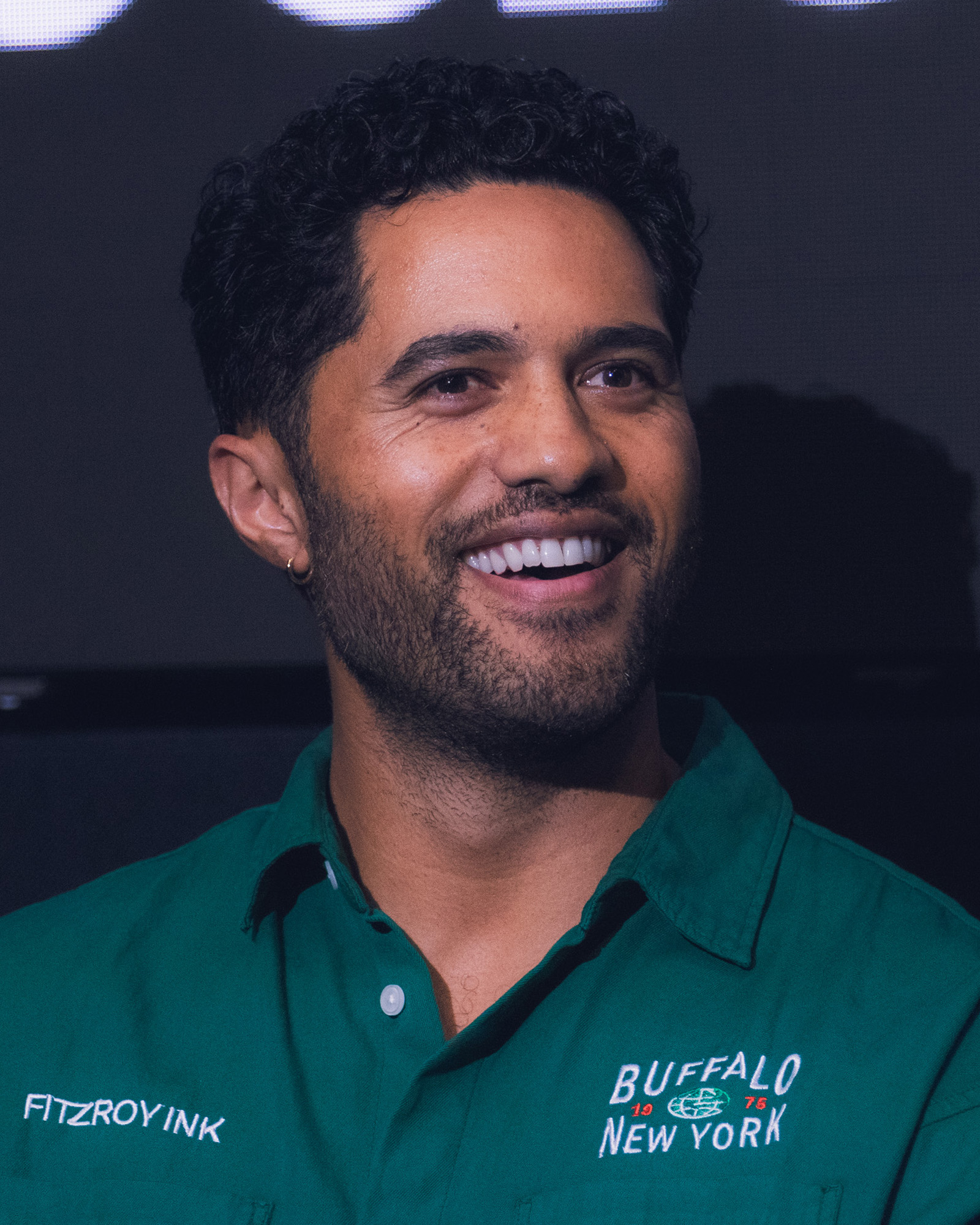
- Tarrant in 2025
- Born: Alexander Tarrant-Keepa; 1990 or 1991 (age 34–35); Raglan, New Zealand
- Education: Toi Whakaari
- Occupation: Actor
- Years active: 2014–present
- Spouse: Luci Hare
- Children: 1

Alexander Tarrant-Keepa (born 1990/1991), known professionally as Alex Tarrant, is a New Zealand actor. With multiple TV and film credits, he currently portrays Noa in the CBS comedy DMV, which aired its series finale on May 11, 2026.

== Early life and education ==
Tarrant grew up in Raglan, New Zealand. He has Māori, Samoan, and Niuean ancestors. He graduated from Fraser High School in 2008. While at high school, he participated in the New Zealand Shakespeare Globe Centre's national schools production and was then part of the Young Shakespeare Company in 2009.

Tarrant graduated from Toi Whakaari, New Zealand's foremost national drama school, in 2012, having won the Museum Art Hotel Scholarship for his final year. (Note: The competitive scholarship is funded by the owner of Museum Hotel for students demonstrating excellence at Toi Whakaari.) While at Toi Whakaari, Tarrant was diagnosed with dyslexia.

== Career ==
Tarrant appeared in season four of SeaChange, and played Maui in the 2015 BBC series Tatau.

Tarrant appeared in When We Go to War, Filthy Rich, 800 Words, and The Other Side of Heaven 2: Fire of Faith. From 2018 to 2019, he played the despised Dr. Lincoln Kimiora on the New Zealand prime-time soap opera Shortland Street.

He played a rebel leader in the 2021 film, Night Raiders, which was selected for the 2021 Toronto International Film Festival. He is currently filming the Amazon Prime Video's series The Lord of the Rings: The Rings of Power. Tarrant also starred in the CBS drama series, NCIS: Hawaiʻi, from 2021–24. In October 2025, he began starring in the CBS comedy, DMV. It ended in 2026 after one season.

== Personal life ==
Tarrant is married to actress Luci Hare and they have a son.

== Filmography ==
Film
Title	Year	Role	Notes	Ref(s)
2019	The Hunt	Joel	Short film	
2019	The Other Side of Heaven 2: Fire of Faith	Toutai Paletu'a		
2021	Night Raiders	Leo		
2026	Sgt. Haane	Sergeant Haane Manahi	Main role Documentary	

Television
Title	Year	Role	Notes	Ref(s)
2014–15	Common Ground	Jacob Williams	Main role Web series	
2014	Nothing Trivial	Jake	Episode: "Complete This Lyric: Should I Stay or Should I Go?"	
2015	Tatau	Maui Vaipiti	Main role Miniseries	
2015	When We Go to War	Manaaki Kokiri	Main role Miniseries	
2015–18	800 Words	Ike	Recurring role (39 episodes)	
2016–17	Filthy Rich	Joe Tamatoa	Main role	
2018–19	Shortland Street	Lincoln Kimiora	148 episodes	
2019	SeaChange	Zac Bell	Main role (season 4)	
2020	Head High	Joe	Episode: Season 1, Episode 5	
2020	Mean Mums	Constable Chris	Recurring role (season 2: 5 episodes)	
2020	Loner	Joel	Main role Web series	
2021	Vegas	Arsenio "Joe" Tierney / Arsenio "Joe" Cheyenne Hamilton	6 episodes	
2021–24	NCIS: Hawaiʻi	Kai Holman	Main role	
2022–24	The Lord of the Rings: The Rings of Power	Valandil	Recurring role	
2024–present	A Remarkable Place to Die	Dr. Ihaka Cooper	Series regular	
2025-26	DMV	Noa	Main role	
