= Libby Hakaraia =

New Zealand film producer and director

Libby Hakaraia MNZM
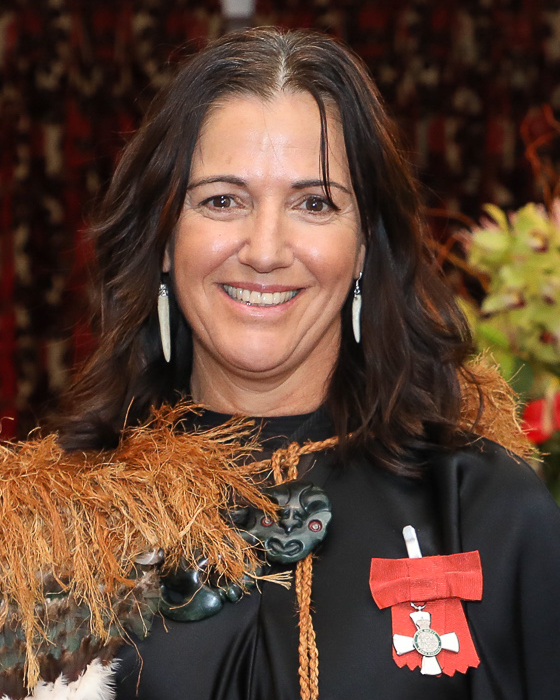
- Hakaraia in 2022
- Born: Lower Hutt
- Citizenship: New Zealand
- Occupation(s): Film producer, director, author

Elizabeth Anne Hakaraia MNZM is a New Zealand film producer, director, and author.

== Biography ==
Hakaraia was raised in Lower Hutt and started her broadcasting career at Radio Waikato when she was 17 years old. When she was 20, she moved to Radio Aotearoa and later to the Australian Broadcasting Corporation. After some time living and working in Europe she returned to New Zealand and worked on National Radio’s Māori magazine show Whenua.

In the later 1990s Hakaraia began researching, producing, writing and directing documentaries and television series. In 2004 she founded her own production company, Blue Bach Productions.

In 2014 Hakaraia established the Māoriland Film Festival; two years later the Māoriland Charitable Trust opened a cinema and arts space which Hakaraia manages.

Hakaraia has been a jury member at ImagineNATIVE, the world’s largest indigenous film festival, and an executive member of Screen Production and Development Association and Ngā Aho Whakaari.

In the early 2000s Hakaraia wrote a book for adult readers and another for children about Matariki, a Māori celebration of the new year.

In the 2022 Queen's Birthday Honours, Hakaraia was appointed a Member of the New Zealand Order of Merit, for services to the film and media industries.

== Filmography ==
Year	Title	Medium	Role	Notes
2021	Cousins	Feature film	Producer	
2018	The Gravedigger of Kapu	Short film	Director and writer	
2017	My Party Song (first episode)	Television series episode	Co-director and producer	
2016	Ra'satste	Short film	Executive producer	
2016	Hautoa Mā! The Rise of Māori Cinema	Television documentary	Director and sound recordist	
2013–2015	My Country Song	Television series	Producer	
2013	The Prophets	Television documentary	Director	
2012	Requiem for Charlie	Television documentary	Producer	
2010	The Scotsman and the Māori	Television documentary	Writer, co-director and producer	
2009	Makereti	Television documentary	Director	
2009	Kehua	Short film	Producer	
2008	The Lawnmower Men of Kapu	Short film	Director and writer	Winner, People's Choice Award: Wairoa Māori Film Festival, 2012
2006	Fat Freddy's Drop – Based on a True Story	Television documentary	Producer and director	
2006	New Brighton Road	Television documentary	Producer	
2005–2011	Tātai Hono	Television series	Producer	
2005	Manhattan Māori	Television documentary	Director	
2005	Whangai – Who Gets Baby?	Television	Producer and director	
2004	Rediscovering the Lost Songs of Sir Apirana Ngata	Television documentary	Producer and director	
2003	Gang Kids	Television film	Director	Winner, TV/Film Award: Media Peace Awards, 2004
2002	Chinks, Coconuts and Curry-munchers	Television documentary	Director	
2001–2003	Mercury Lane	Television series	Director	
2001	Ihi Frenzy	Television documentary	Director	
2001	Trip of a Lifetime	Television	Director	
1999	Taumata	Television	Producer	
1999	Hell for Leather	Television documentary	Writer	

== Publications ==
- Hakaraia, L. (2008). Matariki: The Māori New Year. North Shore, N.Z: Raupo.
- Hakaraia, L., & Urlich, C. W. (2008). Te kahui o Matariki: Contemporary Māori art for Matariki. North Shore City, N.Z: Raupo.
- Hakaraia, L. (2004). Matariki. Auckland, N.Z.: Reed.

== Personal life ==
Hakaraia's iwi are Ngāti Kapumanawawhiti, Ngāti Raukawa, Ngāti Toa Rangatira and Te Āti Awa. Her partner is film producer Tainui Stevens.
