= Māoriland Film Festival =

Māori/international Indigenous filmmakers festival in New Zealand

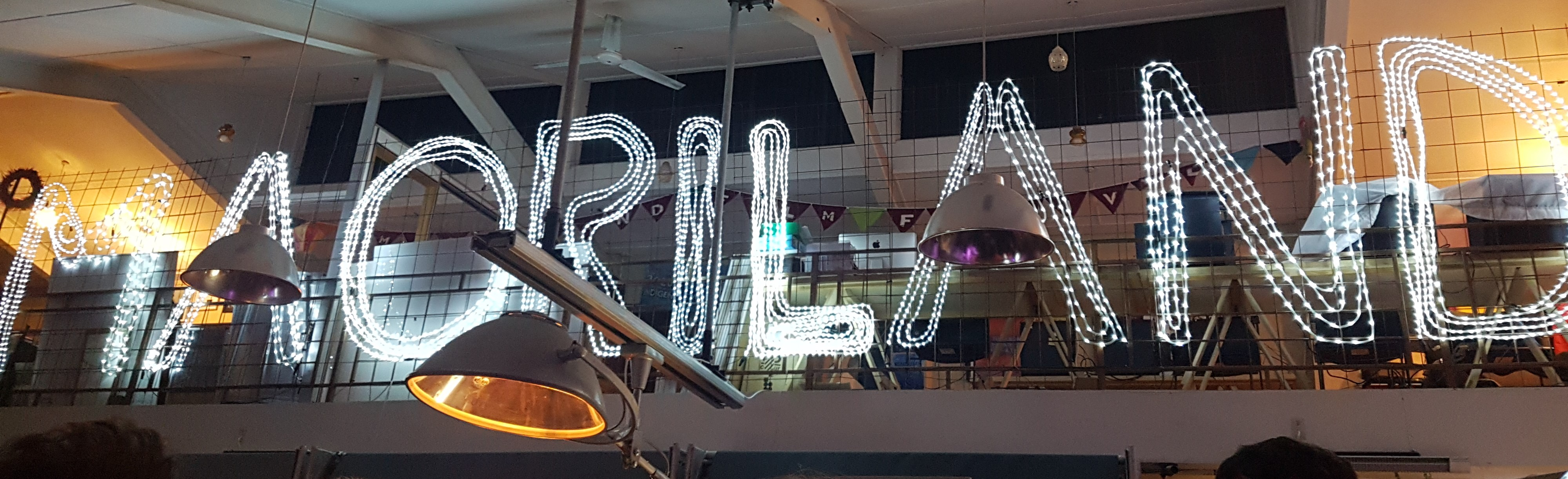
- Māoriland sign in their Ōtaki venue
- Location: Ōtaki, Kāpiti Coast District, Wellington Region, New Zealand
- Founded: 2014
- Most recent: 2026
- Website: mff.maorilandfilm.co.nz

The Māoriland Film Festival is a festival of film and creative endeavours that supports and hosts Māori and international Indigenous filmmakers and creatives. It is held annually in the Kāpiti Coast community of Ōtaki, in the North Island of New Zealand.

== About ==
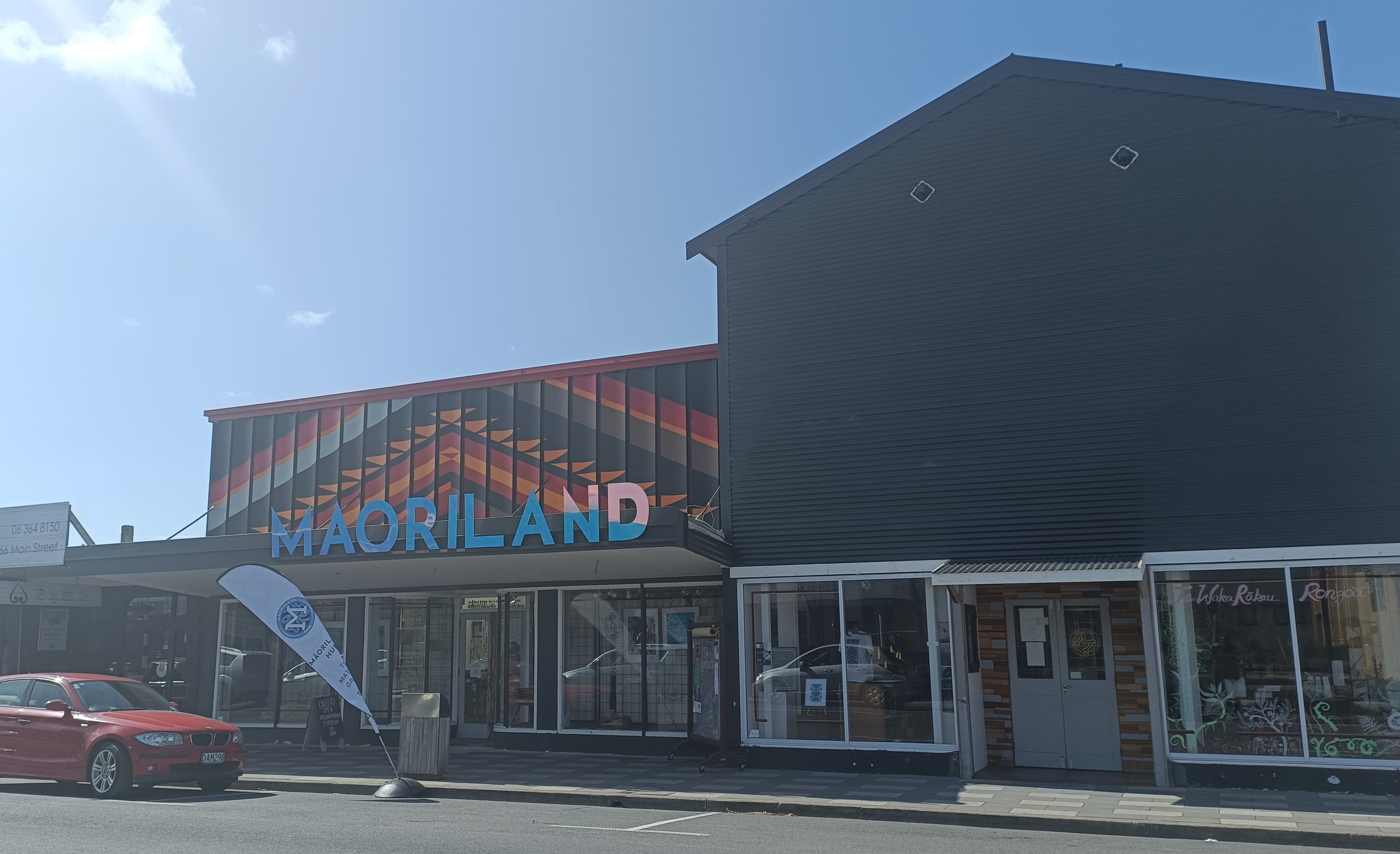
Māoriland

Set up initially to boost the local advancement of the Ōtaki community through connection to the wider world of Indigenous creativity and innovation, it is now an extended festival throughout the Wellington region. The vision of "Embed my native soul in film" describes the festival's intention to become the Native "Sundance Film Festival". The Māoriland Film Festival support new local indigenous filmmakers including having a Māoriland Rangatahi Strategy. This vision is for rangatahi (young people) to be creatively connected across the Indigenous world.

The festival started in 2014. Since then it has grown to be the largest presenter of Indigenous screen content in the Southern Hemisphere, with a year-round programme of events that include industry-focussed events, emerging technology (VR/AR/XR), a lecture series, NATIVE Minds, sound and stage performances, a full visual arts programme and Toi Matarau.

=== Background to the name ===
In the early 1920s Australian company Federated Feature Films Ltd proposed a New Zealand branch to produce feature films. A Mr Frank Moore visited on their behalf and suggested Ōtaki as a suitable place to establish a studio because of the town’s varied scenery and "potent actinic rays" (white light). The New Zealand Moving Picture Company (Maoriland Films) was established. Over six months, the company made three films: "Otaki Gorge Buller Lake", "Otaki Maori Life: Historic Otaki", and "Charlie's Capers" (a comedy starring a Charlie Chaplin impersonator). The dream for Ōtaki to be “The Los Angelos (sp) of New Zealand's moving picture industry” was fleeting due to the lack of support facilities for film in New Zealand at that time.

== People ==
Libby Hakaraia has been behind the Festival since the beginning bringing a background in broadcasting, TV and film. She is passionate about local and Indigenous storytelling, and using contemporary tools to reach wider audiences. She argues that Māori filmmaking is a way to empower our communities. It is a process that "our culture understands inherently. After all, we are merely lending images to stories we have always shared”. Taika Waititi was one of the first film-makers to present a keynote address at the 2014 festival and is supportive of the principles saying in his Oscar Best Adapted Screenplay acceptance speech for Jojo Rabbit: "I dedicate this to all the indigenous kids in the world who want to do art and dance and write stories; we are the original storytellers and we can make it here, as well". Other presenters in recent years have included Rawiri Paratene and Rena Owen.

== Connections ==
Early on the Film Festival connected with other festivals and Indigenous groups including ImagineNative, the largest presenter of Indigenous films in the world, based in Toronto.
