= Christopher Gorham =

American actor (born 1974)

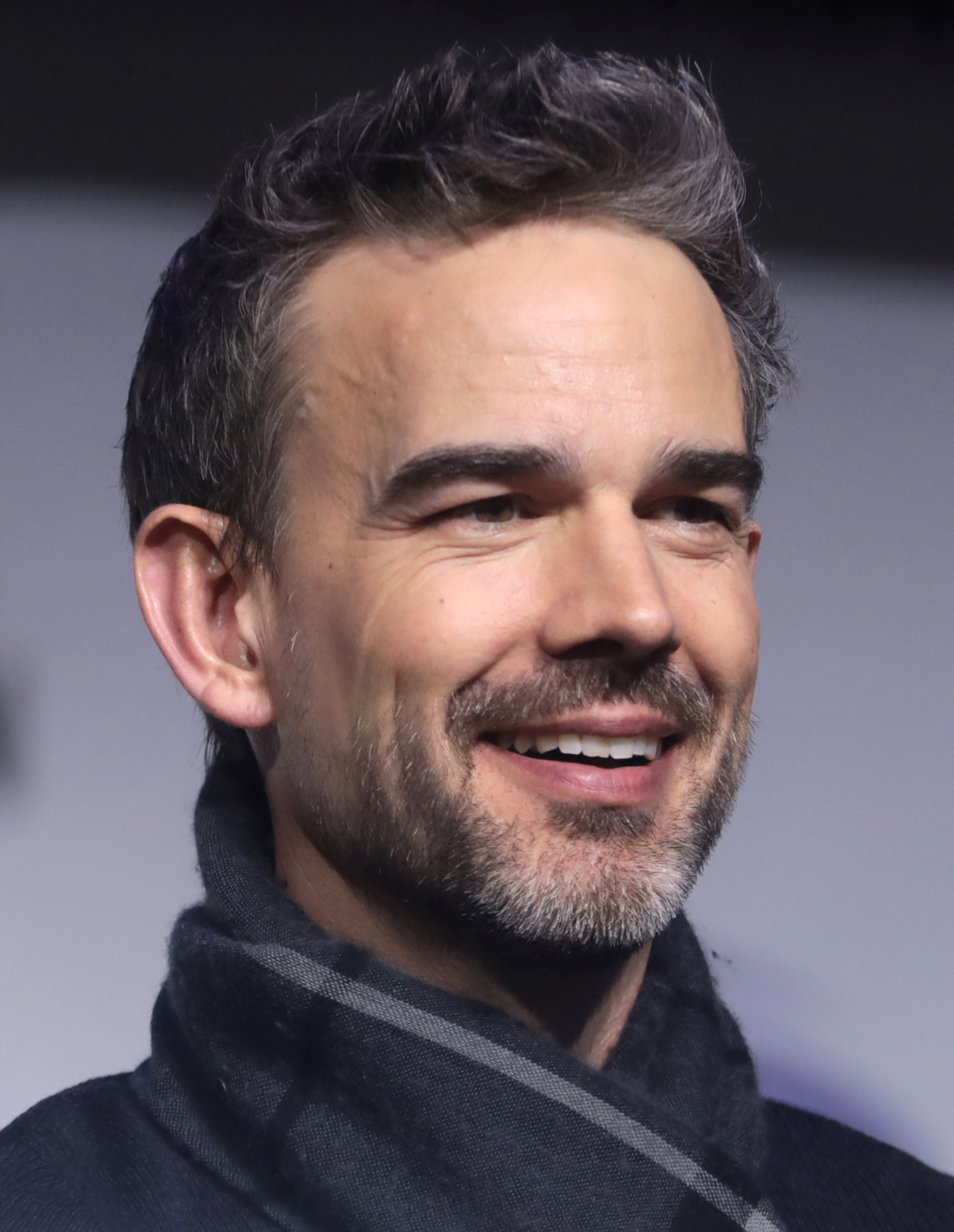
- Gorham in 2023
- Born: Christopher David Gorham; August 14, 1974 (age 52); Fresno, California, U.S.
- Education: University of California, Los Angeles (BA)
- Occupation: Actor
- Years active: 1997–present
- Spouse: Anel Lopez (m. 2000)
- Children: 3

Christopher David Gorham (born August 14, 1974) is an American actor. He is best known for his work on television, particularly for playing Henry Grubstick on the ABC comedy-drama series Ugly Betty, Auggie Anderson on the action-drama series Covert Affairs, Bob Barnard on the dark comedy-drama series Insatiable, Harrison John on The WB’s teen comedy-drama series Popular, Henry Dunn in the limited slasher series Harper's Island, and Trevor Elliott on the legal drama series The Lincoln Lawyer.

Gorham was also part of the main cast of several TV shows that were cancelled either during or after their first season, such as the science fiction series Odyssey 5 and Jake 2.0, the medical drama series Medical Investigation, and the sitcom Out of Practice.

In film, he was the voice of Barry Allen / The Flash in the DC Animated Movie Universe beginning with Justice League: War (2014) and ending with Justice League Dark: Apokolips War (2020).

== Early life ==
Gorham was born in Fresno, California, to David Gorham, a certified public accountant, and Cathryn Gorham, a school nurse. He attended the Roosevelt School of the Arts and graduated from UCLA with a B.A. in Theater in 1996. While in college he participated in many sports, including martial arts, stage combat, fencing, rollerblading, and ballroom dancing.

== Career ==
His first job in the acting business was as an intern on Baywatch (1989). Gorham has appeared in a number of science-fiction TV series, ranging from a starring role in Odyssey 5 to the title character in Jake 2.0. He also had roles on Party of Five, Felicity, and Without a Trace. He has also acted in films, including 2001's The Other Side of Heaven co-starring Anne Hathaway.

Gorham played Harrison John in the WB series Popular and Dr. Miles McCabe in the NBC drama Medical Investigation. He played the lead role in the short-lived CBS series Out of Practice. He was also the lead of ABC Family's original movie Relative Chaos.

Three years after Jake 2.0 ended, Gorham had a recurring role as Henry Grubstick in Silvio Horta's new series, Ugly Betty, and played the main love interest for the series' heroine Betty Suarez (played by America Ferrera). For his role, Gorham was nominated for a Screen Actors Guild Award for Outstanding Performance by an Ensemble in a Comedy Series. He joined the cast full-time for the series' second season. He then left in July 2008, but returned for the season three and then also the season four finale. He starred in the 2009 CBS TV miniseries, Harper's Island, in which characters were killed off every week leading to the eventual reveal of the murderer. He also played Bobby on 2 Broke Girls.

From July 13, 2010, until December 18, 2014, Gorham played blind special ops agent Auggie Anderson on Covert Affairs, leading the main character, a trainee CIA agent played by Piper Perabo, at her new job. The series was highly successful for the USA Network, running for five seasons. The series was cancelled in January 2015. BuddyTV ranked Gorham fifth on its list of "TV's Sexiest Men of 2011".

In 2014 Gorham recurred in the back half of the third season of Once Upon a Time as Walsh, the Wizard of Oz. He played DA Bob Barnard on the Netflix series Insatiable which premiered on August 10, 2018.

On March 25, 2021, it was announced that Gorham was cast as Trevor Elliot, the accused client of Mickey Haller in the Netflix series The Lincoln Lawyer with Manuel Garcia-Rulfo as Mickey Haller.

Gorham is also the voice of Barry Allen / Flash in the DC Animated Movie Universe, beginning with Justice League: War (2014) and concluding with Justice League Dark: Apokolips War (2020).

== Personal life ==
Gorham is married to Anel Lopez Gorham, who also performed on Popular. They have three children as of 2009. His son Lucas was diagnosed with Asperger syndrome and Gorham has become an autism awareness advocate. Gorham stated:

I don't think of him as my son with Asperger's. I think of him as my son. He's not wrong. He's not broken. He is who he is. We, as his parents, are going to do our best — as we do with all of our kids — to give him the best shot at having the best life he can.

== Filmography ==
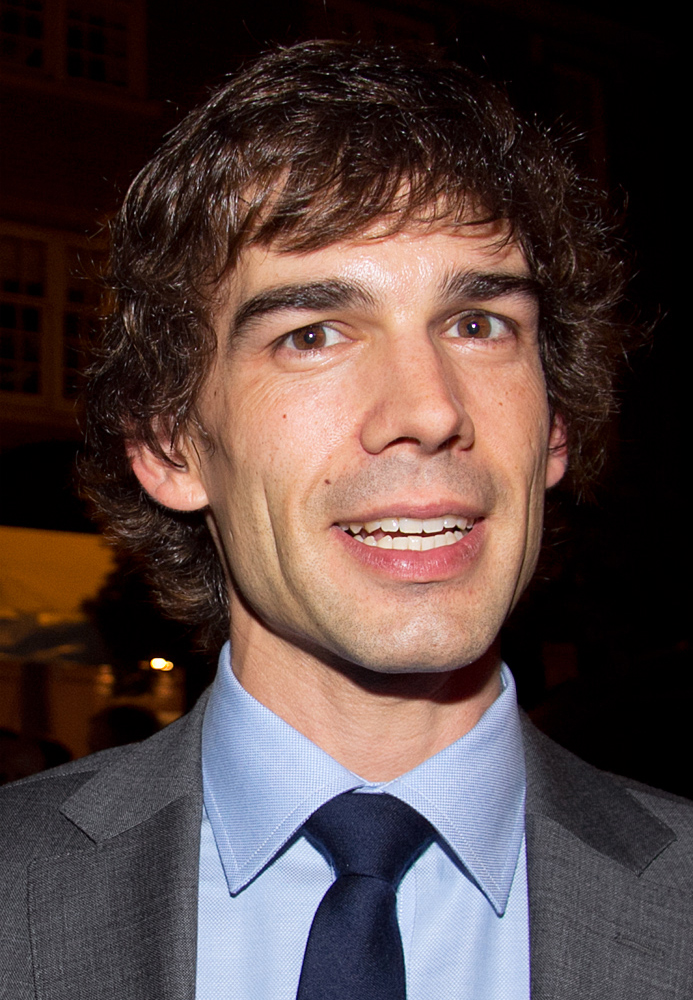
Gorham at the 2011 Toronto International Film Festival

=== Film ===
| Year | Title | Role | Notes |
|---|---|---|---|
| 1997 | Shopping for Fangs | Extra | |
| 1997 | A Life Less Ordinary | Walt | |
| 2000 | Dean Quixote | Real happy fella | |
| 2001 | The Other Side of Heaven | John Groberg | Camie Award |
| 2004 | Spam-ku | Roy | |
| 2010 | My Girlfriend's Boyfriend | Ethan Reed | |
| 2010 | Answer This! | Paul Tarson | |
| 2011 | The Ledge | Chris | |
| 2011 | Somebody's Hero | Dennis Sullivan | Coney Island Film Festival Award for Best Feature |
| 2014 | Justice League: War | Barry Allen / Flash | Voice, direct-to-video |
| 2015 | Justice League: Throne of Atlantis | Barry Allen / Flash | Voice, direct-to-video |
| 2016 | Justice League vs. Teen Titans | Barry Allen / Flash | Voice, direct-to-video |
| 2016 | A Boy Called Po | David Wilson | |
| 2017 | We Love You, Sally Carmichael! | Simon Hayes / Sally Carmichael | Directorial debut |
| 2018 | The Death of Superman | Barry Allen / Flash | Voice, direct-to-video |
| 2019 | Reign of the Supermen | Barry Allen / Flash | Voice, direct-to-video |
| 2019 | The Other Side of Heaven 2: Fire of Faith | John Groberg | |
| 2020 | Justice League Dark: Apokolips War | Barry Allen / Flash | Voice, direct-to-video |
| 2020 | One Night in Miami... | Johnny Carson | |
| 2023 | Batman: The Doom That Came to Gotham | Green Arrow / Oliver Queen | Voice, direct-to-video |

=== Television ===
| Year | Title | Role | Notes |
|---|---|---|---|
| 1997 | Spy Game | Daniel / Lucas | Episode: "Nobody Ever Said Growing Up Was Easy" |
| 1997–98 | Party of Five | Elliot | 4 episodes |
| 1998 | Buffy the Vampire Slayer | James Stanley | Episode: "I Only Have Eyes for You" |
| 1998 | Vengeance Unlimited | Jason Harrington | Episode: "Noir" |
| 1999 | Saved by the Bell: The New Class | Mark Carlson | Episode: "Liz Burns Eric" |
| 1999–2001 | Popular | Harrison John | 43 episodes |
| 2001–02 | Felicity | Trevor O'Donnell | 8 episodes |
| 2002–03 | Odyssey 5 | Neil Taggart | 19 episodes |
| 2003 | Boomtown | Gordon Sinclair | Episode: "Monster's Brawl" |
| 2003 | CSI: Crime Scene Investigation | Corey | Episode: "Crash and Burn" |
| 2003 | Without a Trace | Josh Abrams | Episode: "Victory for Humanity" |
| 2003–04 | Jake 2.0 | Jake Foley | 16 episodes |
| 2004–05 | Medical Investigation | Dr. Miles McCabe | 20 episodes |
| 2005–06 | Out of Practice | Benjamin Barnes | 22 episodes |
| 2006 | Relative Chaos | Dil Gilbert | Television film |
| 2006–10 | Ugly Betty | Henry Grubstick | 33 episodes |
| 2008 | The Batman | William Mallory / Wrath | Voice, episode: "The End of the Batman" |
| 2008–09 | Harper's Island | Henry Dunn | 13 episodes |
| 2010–14 | Covert Affairs | Auggie Anderson | 75 episodes |
| 2011 | Love Bites | Dale | Episode: "Boys to Men" |
| 2012 | Hot in Cleveland | Casey | Episode: "Tangled Web" |
| 2014 | Once Upon a Time | Walsh, Wizard of Oz | 3 episodes |
| 2016 | Heartbeat | Wyatt | 2 episodes |
| 2016 | Major Crimes | Dax Pirig | Episode: "Cashed Out" |
| 2017 | 2 Broke Girls | Bobby | 8 episodes |
| 2017 | The Magicians | Senator John Gaines | 3 episodes |
| 2018–19 | Insatiable | Bob Barnard | 22 episodes |
| 2019 | Modern Family | Brad | Episode: "Perfect Pairs" |
| 2022 | The Lincoln Lawyer | Trevor Elliot | 10 episodes |
| 2022 | Leverage: Redemption | Richard Prosper | Episode: "The Pyramid Job" |
| 2023 | Accused | Jason | Episode: "Morgan's Story" |
| 2023 | NCIS: Los Angeles | Alex | Episodes: "Maybe Today" |
| 2025 | Matlock | Ben Vogel | Episode: "A Traitor in Thine Own House" |
| 2025 | Doctor Odyssey | Marcus | 2-part episodes: "The Wave" |
| 2025 | Tempest | Ethan | 3 episodes |
| 2025–26 | Georgie and Mandy's First Marriage | Scott | 5 episodes |
| 2025–26 | Sheriff Country | Travis Fraley | Main cast |

=== Video games ===
| Year | Title | Role | Notes |
|---|---|---|---|
| 1999 | Star Trek: Hidden Evil | Ensign Sovok | |
