= Michael Cassidy (actor) =

American film and television actor (born 1983)

- Born: March 20, 1983 (age 43); Portland, Oregon, U.S.
- Other name: Mike
- Occupation: Actor
- Years active: 2004–present
- Spouse: Laura Eichhorn (m. 2006)
- Children: 3

Michael Cassidy (born March 20, 1983) is an American film and television actor. He is best known for his role as Zach Stevens on The O.C. and as Tyler Mitchell on the TBS comedy Men at Work. He portrayed Jonathan Walsh on comedy People of Earth from the show's start in 2016 until its 2018 cancellation.

== Early life ==
Cassidy was born in Portland, Oregon. He graduated from La Salle High School in Milwaukie, Oregon, in 2001, and graduated from the Two-Year Conservatory program at The New Actors Workshop in New York City in 2003.

== Career ==
Cassidy is perhaps best known for his role as Zach Stevens throughout the second season of the television series The O.C.; his character had an on-again/off-again relationship with Summer Roberts. Cassidy also had a role in the 2006 film Zoom.

In 2007, Cassidy played Cliff Wiatt in The CW television program, Hidden Palms.

Cassidy joined the cast of Smallville, a television show based on the DC Comics' superhero Superman, in the series' seventh season, starring as the new editor of the Daily Planet, Grant Gabriel, a love interest of Lois Lane. In truth, he was Julian Luthor, the cloned and aged brother of Lex. In the episode "Persona," Cassidy's character was shot dead, marking the end of his character's saga. Cassidy later returned to the Superman franchise portraying Jimmy Olsen in the 2016 film Batman v Superman: Dawn of Justice. In the early 2000s, Cassidy auditioned for the role of Superman in the JJ Abrams-penned film Superman Flyby, which ultimately went unmade.

He played Charlie Hogan, the best friend of Megan Smith (JoAnna Garcia) in the first fourteen episodes of the television show Privileged.

Cassidy then portrayed Tyler Mitchell on the TBS show Men at Work for three seasons.

Cassidy also had small roles in the film Argo, and in The Guilt Trip, both in 2012.

On February 27, 2015, Cassidy joined the NBC workplace comedy pilot, Not Safe for Work; however, the pilot was passed on.

Cassidy joined the TBS pilot People of Earth opposite Wyatt Cenac. It was picked up for series on January 7, 2016. Cassidy played the charismatic and successful Jonathan Walsh, CEO of Walsh Media.

== Personal life ==
In August 2006, Cassidy married girlfriend Laura Eichhorn, whom he met in high school. They have three children.

== Filmography ==
=== Film ===
Year	Title	Role	Notes
2005	The Girl from Monday	Ted	
2005	Dare	Johnny	
2006	Zoom	Dylan West / Houdini	
2012	Argo	Jordan's Analyst	
2012	The Guilt Trip	Fake Andy	Uncredited
2015	Night of the Living Deb	Ryan Waverly	Also producer
2016	Batman v Superman: Dawn of Justice	Jimmy Olsen	Cameo
2017	The Stray	Mitch Davis	
2018	Dog Days	Dr. Mike	
2018	The Dare Project	Johnny	
2018	Jingle Around the Clock	Max Turner	
2020	Breaking Fast	Kal	
2021	Army of the Dead	Sergeant Cassidy	
2022	Hypochondriac	NP Chaz	
2026	Gail Daughtry and the Celebrity Sex Pass	Tom Soursap McNoodleman	

=== Television ===
Year	Title	Role	Notes
2004–2005	The O.C.	Zach Stevens	Recurring role (season 2); 19 episodes
2007	Hidden Palms	Cliff Wiatt	Main role
2007–2008	Smallville	Grant Gabriel	Recurring role
2008–2009	Privileged	Charlie Hogan	Main role
2010	Castle	Greg McClintock	Episode: "Anatomy of a Murder"
2010	The Pink House		Unsold pilot
2012	Happy Endings	Male Lead	Episode: "The Shrink, the Dare, Her Date and Her Brother"
2012	Are You There, Chelsea?	Jonathan	Episode: "Pilot"
2012	Scandal	Travis Harding	Episode: "Hell Hath No Fury"
2012–2014	Men at Work	Tyler Mitchell	Main role
2013	Masters of Sex	Dr. Malcolm Toll	Episode: "Phallic Victories"
2015	Not Safe for Work	Dale	Unsold pilot
2015	Stalker	Brian Mitchell	Episode: "Love Kills"
2015–2016	The Magicians	James	4 episodes
2016	The Night Shift	Sam	4 episodes
2016–2017	People of Earth	Jonathan Walsh	Main role
2018	Station 19	Peter	Episode: "Every Second Counts"
2018	The Guest Book	Tim	Episode: "Killer Party"
2019–2020	The Rookie	Caleb Wright	2 episodes
2020	Into The Dark	Tom	Episode: "Delivered"
2021	Mythic Quest	Peter Cromwell	Episode: "Backstory!"
2021–2025	Resident Alien	Dr. Ethan Stone	Recurring role
2022	Good Trouble	Asher	Recurring role
2023	Waco: The Aftermath	Bill Johnston	Recurring role
2023	Fatal Attraction	Clay Bishop	2 episodes
2024	Found	Christian Evans	Recurring role
2025	Ballard	Aaron	Recurring role
2025	Law & Order: Special Victims Unit	Derek Simpson	Episode: " A Waiver of Consent"

=== Web ===
Year	Title	Role	Notes
2009	Rockville CA	Dax	2 episodes
2010	Blue Belle	Daniel	Episode: "A Dude in Vegas"
2012	CollegeHumor Originals	Robert	Episode: "Breaking Dawn Cheating Outtakes"
2014	Millennial Parents	Leo	Episode: "Tamed in the Man Cave"
