= John H. Groberg =

American LDS Church leader (born 1934)

First Quorum of the Seventy
- April 3, 1976 – October 1, 2005
- Called by: Spencer W. Kimball
- End reason: Granted general authority emeritus status

Presidency of the Seventy
- April 3, 2004 – August 15, 2005
- Called by: Gordon B. Hinckley
- End reason: Honorably released

Emeritus General Authority
- October 1, 2005
- Called by: Gordon B. Hinckley

Personal details
- Born: John Holbrook Groberg; June 17, 1934 (age 92); Idaho Falls, Idaho, United States

John Holbrook Groberg (born June 17, 1934) is an American religious leader, writer, and real estate investor who has served as a general authority of the Church of Jesus Christ of Latter-day Saints (LDS Church) since 1976. He was granted emeritus status in October 2005, and served as a member of the Presidency of the Seventy from 2004 to 2005.

He is most known for his service as an LDS Church missionary, and later mission president, in Tonga. The experiences from his mission were the subject of his memoir, The Eye of the Storm, which was made into a 2001 movie The Other Side of Heaven. A sequel movie about his experiences as mission president, The Other Side of Heaven 2: Fire of Faith, was released in 2019. Groberg was portrayed in both movies by Christopher Gorham.

== Early life and education ==
Groberg was born to Delbert V. and Jennie Groberg in Idaho Falls, Idaho in 1934. He grew up in Idaho Falls during and after the Great Depression. Groberg received a bachelor's degree from Brigham Young University (BYU) and an MBA from Indiana University. He was involved in real estate in the Idaho Falls area.

== LDS Church service ==
=== Mission to Tonga ===
Groberg served as an LDS Church missionary in Tonga. He experienced much difficulty in getting to Tonga: he was prevented from arriving by strikes, visa problems, and transport issues. Groberg served briefly in Los Angeles, Samoa, and Fiji while waiting for his transport to be finalized. When he finally arrived in Tonga, his first assignment was on the remote island of Niuatoputapu, which had had only limited contact with the outside world in the form of an occasional telegraph and a visiting boat. During the year he spent on the island, Groberg suffered from mosquitoes, a typhoon, and starvation. His missionary companion on Niuatoputapu was Feki Po'uha, who would later serve as district president in Niue, while Groberg was president of the church's Tongan Mission (which at that point included Niue).

After a year on Niuatoputapu, Groberg was assigned to more developed islands and served as a district president supervising smaller branches of the church. Groberg later reported that the branches he dealt with lacked unity and morality. He had little contact with his mission president and nearly drowned when pushed out of a boat during a major storm; he also suffered frequently from exhaustion. Groberg was denied an extension to his mission that would have allowed him to accompany a group of church converts to the New Zealand Temple.

Groberg wrote a book about his mission from his memoirs called In the Eye of the Storm, which was adapted into the 2001 Disney film The Other Side of Heaven. The New York Times explains of Groberg's character, "The narrator and hero of The Other Side of Heaven, is a Mormon missionary dispatched to the Tongan islands in the Pacific Ocean immediately after his high school graduation in the 1950s." A sequel to the film, The Other Side of Heaven 2: Fire of Faith, was made in 2018 with the same actor, Christopher Gorham, in the role of Groberg.

=== Later church service ===
Groberg later served in the LDS Church as a bishop in Idaho Falls from 1960 to 1965. He returned to Tonga as president of the Tonga-Fiji mission, which included Niue, serving from 1965 to 1968. In 1970, Groberg became a regional representative with the assignment to oversee church's operations in Tonga.

In April 1976, Groberg became an LDS Church general authority. In the mid-1990s, he was president of the church's Asia Area, where he was closely connected with the initial sending of church missionaries into Cambodia. He later served as president of the church's Utah South Area, where he was responsible for initiating programs for missionary work among the Latino population there, and attempts to ensure that English-speaking wards home taught the Latino members within their boundaries, even if they attended separate Spanish-speaking congregations. Groberg also served as president of the North America West Area from 1990 to 1994. In May 1992, Groberg presided over the organization of the San Francisco California East Stake, the church's first Tongan-speaking stake in the United States. In 2000, Groberg was called into the Sunday School general presidency.

In 2005, Groberg was designated as an emeritus general authority. From 2005 to 2008, he was president of the church's Idaho Falls Idaho Temple. Groberg's parents also served as president and matron of the temple from 1975 to 1980.

== Personal life ==
Groberg married Jean Sabin and they have had 11 children. Groberg is an Eagle Scout and recipient of the Distinguished Eagle Scout Award.

== Publications ==
- Groberg, John H. (2001) [1993]. The Other Side of Heaven. Salt Lake City, Utah: Deseret Book. ISBN 978-1-57008-789-9. OCLC 48617254.
- —— (1996). The Fire of Faith. Salt Lake City, Utah: Bookcraft. ISBN 978-1-57008-290-0. OCLC 36362029.
- —— (2004). Christmas on the Other Side of Heaven. Salt Lake City, Utah: Deseret Book. ISBN 978-1-59038-352-0. OCLC 60354108.
- —— (2006). Anytime, Anywhere. Salt Lake City, Utah: Deseret Book. ISBN 978-1-59038-643-9. OCLC 68623990.

== See also ==
- John H. Groberg, "The Power of God's Love", Liahona, November 2004
