= Clara Perez =

Venezuelan actress

- Born: 5 April 1981; Caracas, Venezuela
- Occupation: Actress
- Years active: 2005–present

Clara Perez is a film and television actress.

== Biography ==
Perez was born in Caracas, Venezuela. She was raised in Caracas; Charlotte, Vermont (USA); and Lincolnshire, England. Perez trained as at the Webber Douglas Academy in London.

Clara Perez has made appearances in a total of 5 films and 2 television series, in 3 episodes.

== Filmography ==
- Christmas Eve (2015) - Amelia
- 2 Graves (2009) - Cherry
- The Bill (2008) - Consuela Perez
- Heroes and Villains (2006) - Jessica
- Running Scared (2006) - Conchita
- Eva (2005) - Eva
- Sea of Souls (2005) (TV series) - Maria (2 episodes)
