= Miriama Smith =

New Zealand actress (born 1976)

- Born: 3 June 1976 (age 50); Rotorua, New Zealand
- Occupations: Film and television actress
- Years active: 1991–present
- Known for: Dana McNichol in Mercy Peak; Elsa/Principal Randall in Power Rangers Dino Thunder; Brady Trubridge in Filthy Rich
- Spouse: Dylan Marychurch
- Children: 1

Miriama Te Rangimarie Smith (born 3 June 1976) is a New Zealand film and television actress who has played roles in various TV shows such as Xena: Warrior Princess, Karaoke High and Shortland Street. Her best-known roles, however, were Moz in the third season of The Tribe, Dana McNichol in Mercy Peak, and Elsa / Principal Randall in the 2004 Power Rangers series, Power Rangers Dino Thunder. She was one of the three judges on the first season of entertainment show New Zealand's Got Talent that aired on Prime TV in 2008. She starred as Brady Trubridge on the TVNZ 2 drama series Filthy Rich.

== Life and career ==
Smith was born in Rotorua, New Zealand. She is of Te Arawa descent.

Smith started her acting career when she was a teen. She did a few commercials and a role in one episode of the TV show Shark in the Park. She was in the movie The Other Side of Heaven in 2001. She played Elsa / Principal Randall in the 2004 Power Rangers Dino Thunder, which was filmed in New Zealand.

She starred in the 2005 Australian TV show Last Man Standing. In 2013, she starred in the movie Mt. Zion. Mt. Zion was a box office success. From 26 February till 2 March 2014, she acted in the play Paniora!, by Briar Grace-Smith, based on the life of Manuel Huerta, at the Soundings Theatre in Te Papa.

In 2016, Smith was the presenter for Finding Aroha on the Māori Television. She starred in the New Zealand show Filthy Rich in 2017. In 2018, it was announced she would be in the TV series adaption of the New Zealand movie The Dead Lands by streaming site Shudder. In 2018, she was chosen to be the voice of the te reo Maori announcement of the Auckland's train system. She returned for the sequel The Other Side of Heaven 2: Fire of Faith, which was released in 2019.

On 31 January 2025, Smith was named in the cast for upcoming Netflix series The Survivors.

== Personal life ==
Smith is married to Dylan Marychurch and they have a son together.

== Filmography ==
=== Film ===
| Title | Year | Role | Notes |
|---|---|---|---|
| 1998 | The Amazing Adventures of Moko Toa | Hara | Direct-to-video |
| 2001 | The Other Side of Heaven | Lavinia | |
| 2001 | Exposure | Elena | Direct-to-video |
| 2002 | Toy Love | Hinemoa | |
| 2004 | Spooked | Ruby Elder | |
| 2007 | We're Here to Help | Kath Harper | Nominated — Qantas Film and Television Award for Performance by an Actress in a leading role in Film |
| 2011 | Netherwood | Maria | |
| 2013 | Mt. Zion | Layla | Nominated — Rialto Channel New Zealand Film Award for Best Actress |
| 2019 | The Other Side of Heaven 2: Fire of Faith | Lavinia | |
| 2020 | Love and Monsters | Maya | |
| 2024 | Ka Whawhai Tonu | Turama | |

=== Television ===
| Title | Year | Role | Notes |
|---|---|---|---|
| 1991 | Shark in the Park | Sally | Episode: "Give a Dog a Bad Name" |
| 1995 | Mirror, Mirror | Ani | Main role |
| 1997–98 | Shortland Street | Nurse Awhina Broughton | Recurring role |
| 1998 | The Adventures of Swiss Family Robinson | Princess Moya | Episodes: "Princess from the Sea: Parts 1–3" |
| 1998 | Young Hercules | Pelia | Episode: "Cold Feet" |
| 2000 | Xena: Warrior Princess | Shiana | Episode: "Antony and Cleopatra" |
| 2001 | The Tribe | Moz | Recurring role (series 3), 16 episodes |
| 2001–04 | Mercy Peak | Dana McNichol | Main role |
| 2001 | Atlantis High | Vita | Main role |
| 2002 | Mataku | Hine | Episode: "The Enchanted Flute" |
| 2002 | Revelations – The Initial Journey | Anaka | Episode: "Tomorrow Is Another Day" |
| 2004 | Power Rangers Dino Thunder | Elsa / Principal Randall | Main role |
| 2005 | Serial Killers | Nurse Pania | Recurring role, 5 episodes |
| 2005 | Last Man Standing | Zoe Hesketh | Main role |
| 2006 | Karaoke High | Angela Bartlett | Main role |
| 2008 | New Zealand's Got Talent | Herself | Judge (series 1) |
| 2010 | Legend of the Seeker | Du' Chaillu | Episode: "Light" |
| 2010 | Kaitangata Twitch | Grace Gallagher | Main role |
| 2010 | Stolen | Donna Hall | Television film |
| 2011 | The Jono Project | Hannah | 1 episode |
| 2012 | Siege | Delwyn Keefe | Television film New Zealand Television Award for Best Performance by a Supporting Actress |
| 2013 | Best Bits | Herself | 1 episode |
| 2016 | Game of Bros | Herself | |
| 2016–17 | Filthy Rich | Brady Trubridge | Main role |
| 2017–18 | 800 Words | Ngahuia | Recurring role (series 3) |
| 2018 | Playing for Keeps | Dr Lauren Gambi | Recurring role, 5 episodes |
| 2020 | Power Rangers Beast Morphers | Regina Collins | 1 Episode |
| 2021 | Harrow | Renae Warrington | 10 episode |
| 2021 | Vegas | Annie Poulan | 6 episodes |
| 2022 | Shortland Street | Ngaire Hetariki | Recurring role |
| 2022 | Good Grief | Maia | 6 episodes |
| 2022 | Latecomers | Brandi | 6 episodes |
| 2023–24 | The Gone | Sergeant Gwenda | 9 episodes |
| 2024 | My Life is Murder | Nadia | 2 episodes |
| 2024–25 | Darby and Joan | Sophie Bairnsdale | 5 episodes |
| 2025 | The Survivors | Detective Sue Pendlebury | TV series; 6 episodes |
| 2026 | Blue Murder Motel | Simona | TV series; episode 7 |
| 2026 | Crackhead | Bella | TV series; main role |
