= Natalie Medlock =

British-born New Zealand actress and writer

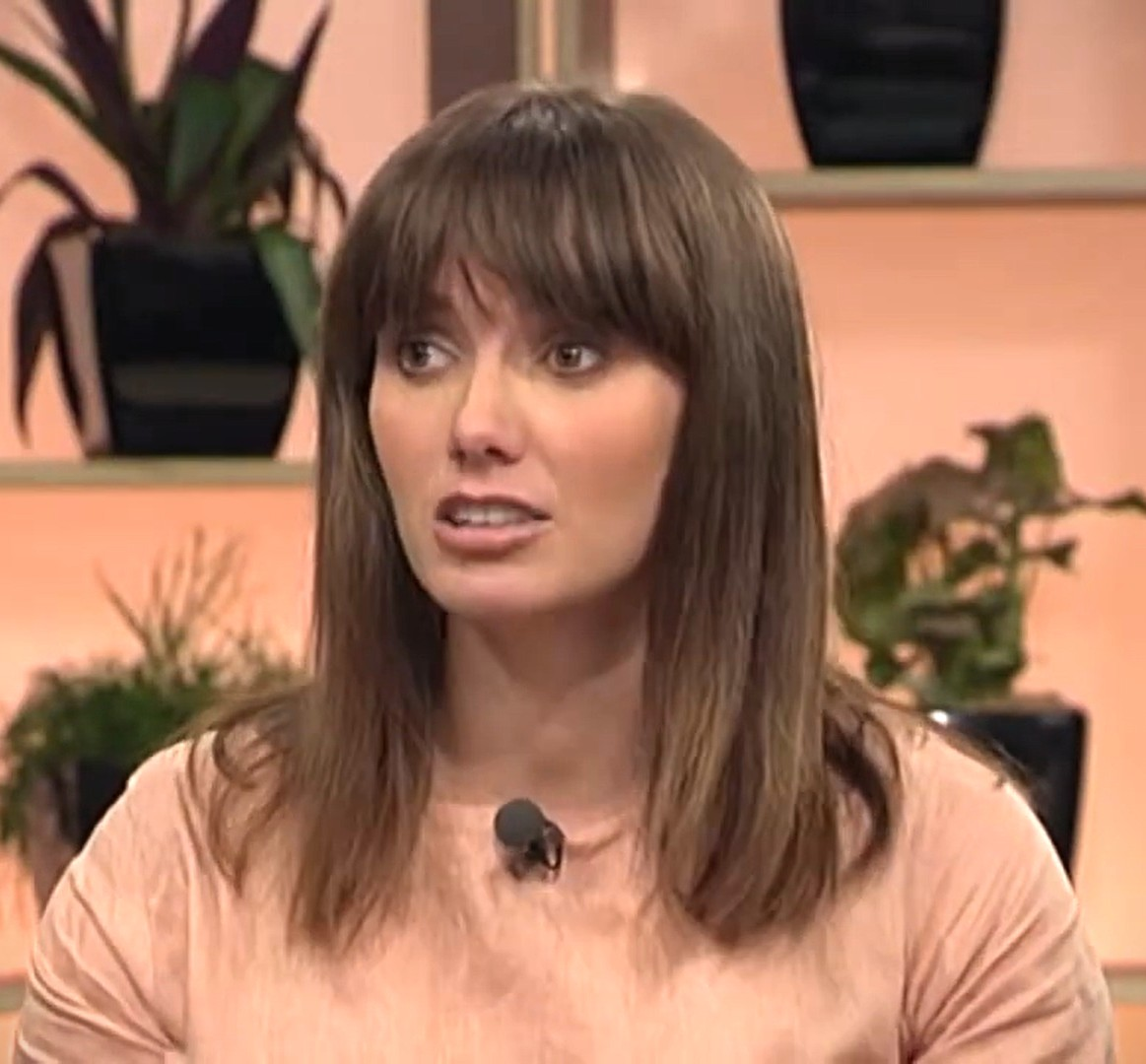
- Medlock in 2018
- Born: 15 October 1986 (age 40); Plymouth, England, United Kingdom
- Occupations: Actress, writer, producer
- Years active: 2005–present
- Notable work: Shortland Street (TV 2011–2012)
- Height: 165 cm (5 ft 5 in)
- Partner: Robbie Magasiva (2011–2022)

Natalie Medlock (born 15 October 1986) is a British-born New Zealand actress and writer best known for her role in Shortland Street as nurse Jill Kingsbury which she played from 3 February 2011 to 16 January 2012.

== Biography ==
Medlock was born and raised in Plymouth, until her parents moved to New Zealand in 1999 with her sister Kate Medlock. The family settled on a drystock farm in Te Puke's Maniatutu Rd. Medlock threw herself into schoolwork, horse riding, piano and performing arts, her teacher inspired and mentored her in stage work. After finishing Year 13, Medlock went to Toi Whaakari: New Zealand Drama School, where she graduated with a Bachelor of Performing Arts (Acting) in 2007. Her big break came with Shortland Street. Despite only being a year on the long running soap the tragic death of the character saddened fans. Medlock also wrote an episode of the soap.

== Personal life ==
From 2011 to 2022, Medlock was in a relationship with former Shortland Street alumni, Robbie Magasiva, the couple divided their time between Australia and New Zealand. They first met in 2009 doing a play called "Christ Almighty!" Medlock recalls it was her costume that earned Magasiva's heart In 2015 the pair went on stage again with Christ Almighty with the Wentworth cast to raise money for the homeless. The couple attributed love and therapy for their long-term relationship.

Medlock revealed she has anxiety and depression the actress and director opened up about its ups and downs and how she had to rely on Magasiva with her family being back in the United Kingdom. After her mental health improved with therapy, medication and support of Magasiva, it inspired her to do a new play called "Near Death Experience" in 2018.

== Filmography ==
=== Film ===
- 2007 – Bad Trip (Short) as English Girl
- 2006 – Wrapped (Short) as Anushka le Coq
- 2016 – The Ex Men as Mary Johnson
- 2019 – The Other Side of Heaven 2: Fire of Faith (2019) as Jean Groberg
- 2021 – There’s no ‘I’ in Threesome as Zoe
- 2022 - ‘’Nude Tuesday’’

=== TV work ===
- 2009 – Diplomatic Immunity Grace
- 2010 – Feedback – Natalie
- 2011–12 – Shortland Street – Jill Kingsbury
- 2012 – Auckland Daze – Natalie
- 2012 – The Almighty Johnsons – Natalie
- 2014 – It's a Date – Karen
- 2014 – Timothy – nurse
- 2015 – Funny Girls
- 2015 – The Yeti Show (Web Series)
- 2016 – The Video Store – customer
- 2016 – Our NZ Escape – presenter
- 2016 – 1953 – London Reporter
- 2018 – Roman Empire: Julius Caesar - Master of Rome – Servilia
- 2025 - "Vince" - Alexis Adams
