= 2006 Air New Zealand Screen Awards =

- Awarded for: Excellence in New Zealand film and television
- Sponsored by: Air New Zealand
- Date: 24 August 2006
- Location: SkyCity Theatre, Auckland
- Country: New Zealand
- Presented by: Screen Directors Guild of New Zealand
- First award: 2005
- Final award: 2007

The 2006 Air New Zealand Screen Awards were held on Thursday 24 August 2006 at SkyCity Theatre in Auckland, New Zealand. Previously known as the New Zealand Screen Awards, the awards were renamed when airline Air New Zealand became the naming-rights sponsor, signing for five years of sponsorship.

The film awards had only four titles in the feature films category: The World's Fastest Indian, No.2, River Queen and Sione's Wedding, with The World's Fastest Indian winning seven of its 10 categories. Hollywood actors Anthony Hopkins and Ruby Dee won the Best Actor and Best Actress awards.

== Nominees and winners ==
There were 13 feature film categories (an increase of one on 2005), two digital feature categories, four short film categories and 28 television categories (an increase of six on 2005).

=== Feature film ===
Best Picture

- The World's Fastest Indian, Gary Hannam, Roger Donaldson
  - No.2, Tim White, Philippa Campbell, Lydia Livingstone
  - River Queen, Don Reynolds, Chris Auty
  - Sione's Wedding, John Barnett, Chloe Smith

Achievement in Directing

- Roger Donaldson, The World's Fastest Indian
  - Toa Fraser, No.2
  - Chris Graham, Sione's Wedding

Screenplay

- Roger Donaldson, The World's Fastest Indian
  - Toa Fraser, No.2
  - James Griffin, Oscar Kightley, Sione's Wedding

Performance by an Actor in a Leading Role

- Anthony Hopkins, The World's Fastest Indian
  - Cliff Curtis, River Queen
  - Shimpal Lelisi, Sione's Wedding

Performance by an Actress in a Leading Role

- Ruby Dee, No.2
  - Teuila Blakely, Sione's Wedding
  - Samantha Morton, River Queen

Performance by an Actor in a Supporting Role

- Rene Naufahu, No.2
  - Xavier Horan, No.2
  - Rawiri Pene, River Queen

Performance by an Actress in a Supporting Role

- Mia Blake, No.2
  - Miriama McDowell, No.2
  - Madeleine Sami, Sione's Wedding

Achievement in Cinematography

- Alun Bollinger, River Queen
  - David Gribble ACS, The World's Fastest Indian
  - Leon Narbey, No.2

Achievement in Editing

- John Gilbert ACE, The World's Fastest Indian
  - Paul Maxwell, Sione's Wedding
  - Chris Plummer, No.2

Achievement in Original Music

- Don McGlashan, No.2
  - J. Peter Robinson, The World's Fastest Indian

Contribution to a Soundtrack

- Tim Prebble, Gethin Creagh, Michael Hedges, The World's Fastest Indian
  - Tony Johnson, Sione's Wedding
  - Tim Prebble, Mike Hedges, Dave Madigan, No.2

Achievement in Production Design

- J. Dennis Washington, Rob Gillies, The World's Fastest Indian
  - Iain Aitken, Sione's Wedding
  - Rick Kofoed, River Queen

Achievement in Costume Design

- Barbara Darragh, River Queen
  - Nancy Cavallaro, Jane Holland, The World's Fastest Indian
  - Jane Holland, Sione's Wedding

=== Digital Feature ===
Best Digital Feature

- {Dream} Preserved, Stephen Kang
  - Banana in a Nutshell, Roseanne Liang
  - Squeegee Bandit, Rhonda Kite, Sandor Lau

Technical Contribution to a Digital Feature

- Sandor Lau, Squeegee Bandit
  - Tim McLachlan, Hidden
  - Derek Pearson, EVENT 16

=== Short film ===
Best Short Film

- Nature's Way, Jane Shearer
  - Blue Willow, Veialu Aila-Unsworth
  - Us, James Blick

Performance in a Short Film

- Alison Bruce, Us
  - Anna Hutchison, The Lost One
  - Matthew Sunderland, Nature's Way

Script for a Short Film

- Paolo Rotondo, Dead Letters
  - Veialu Aila-Unsworth, Blue Willow
  - James Blick, Us

Technical Contribution to a Short Film

- Andrew Commis, Nature's Way
  - Grant Major, Dead Letters
  - Tom Reilly, The Ambassador's Brain

=== Television ===
Best Drama Programme

- Outrageous Fortune (ep 4), Mike Smith (South Pacific Pictures)
  - 'The Insider's Guide To Love' (ep 2), Dave Gibson, Donna Malane, Chris Tyson (The Gibson Group)
  - The Market (ep1), Rachel Jean (Isola Productions Ltd)

Best Drama Series

- Outrageous Fortune, Mike Smith (South Pacific Pictures)
  - The Insider's Guide To Love, Dave Gibson, Donna Malane, Chris Tyson (The Gibson Group)
  - The Market, Rachel Jean (Isola Productions Ltd)

Best Comedy Programme

- bro'Town, Elizabeth Mitchell (Firehorse Films)
  - Facelift – series 3, Chris Ellis, Dave Gibson (The Gibson Group)
  - Seven Periods with Mr Gormsby, Tom Scott, Danny Mulheron (Direct Hit)

Best Documentary

- The Promise, Leanne Pooley (Spacific Films)
  - Black Grace, From Cannon's Creek to Jacob's Pillow, Aileen O'Sullivan, Toby Mills (Seannachie/Tawera Productions)
  - Lifting of the Makutu, Peta Carey (Watershed Films)

Best Documentary / Factual Series

- High Times, Rachel Jean (Isola Productions Ltd)
  - Off the Rails – A Love Story, Melanie Rakena, Marcus Lush (Jam TV)
  - Wicked Weather, John Hyde (NHNZ)

Best Mäori Language Programme

- Koi, Chris Winitana (Awekura Productions)
  - Moteatea, Hinewehi Mohi, Fran Davey (Raukatauri Productions)
  - Pukana, Matai Smith (Cinco Cine Film Productions)

Best Children's Programme

- Holly's Heroes, Dave Gibson (The Gibson Group), Ann Darrouzet, Jenni Tosi (Tosi Westside)
  - QTV, "Project Q", Glenis Giles (Oliver Giles Productions)
  - Smokefreerockquest 2005, Pamela Cain, Lorraine Barry (Screentime Ltd)

Best Lifestyle/Entertainment Programme

- Dancing With the Stars, Debra Kelleher (TVNZ)
  - Game of Two-Halves, Carlena Smith (Eyeworks Touchdown)
  - The Living Room, series 3, Mark Albiston, Amelia Bardsley (Sticky Pictures)

Best Event Broadcast

- Westfield Style Pasifika 2005, Stan Wolfgramm, Julie Smith (Drum Productions)
  - National Mäori Sports Awards 2005, Bailey Mackey, Brendon Butt (Mäori Television)
  - Shihad Live Aotea Square, Hayley Cunningham (Visionary Film & Television)

Best Reality Series

- Border Patrol "Busted at the Border", Nigel Snowden (Cream TV)
  - Miss Popularity, Greg Heathcote, Julie Christie (Eyeworks Touchdown)
  - The Big Experiment, Charlotte Purdy, Sam Blackley, Jill Graham (Rogue Productions)

Performance by an Actress

- Kate Elliott, The Insider's Guide To Love
  - Luanne Gordon, Interrogation
  - Cherie James, The Market

Performance by a Supporting Actress

- Claire Chitham, Interrogation
  - Anapela Polataivao, The Market
  - Antonia Prebble, Outrageous Fortune

Performance by an Actor

- Gareth Reeves, The Insider's Guide To Love
  - Xavier Horan, The Market
  - Antony Starr, Outrageous Fortune

Performance by a Supporting Actor

- Pete Smith, The Market
  - Nick Dunbar, The Insider's Guide To Love
  - Joel Tobeck, Interrogation

Presenter Entertainment/Factual

- Marcus Lush, Off the Rails – A Love Story
  - Tamati Coffey, What Now (Whitebait TV)
  - Temuera Morrison, The Tem Show (Greenstone Pictures)

Script, Single Episode of a Drama Series or Serial

- Fiona Samuel, Interrogation, "Girl in Woods"
  - Paula Boock, The Insider's Guide To Love, episode 6
  - Rachel Lang & James Griffin, Outrageous Fortune, episode 13

Script, Comedy

- Oscar Kightley, Mario Gaoa, David Fane, Shimpal Lelisi, Elizabeth Mitchell, bro'Town, "Touched by a Teacher"
  - Dave Armstrong, Danny Mulheron, Tom Scott, Seven Periods with Mr Gormsby, episode 3
  - Peter Cox, The Pretender, episode 1

Achievement in Directing, Drama/Comedy Programme

- Nathan Price, The Insider's Guide To Love
  - Mark Beesley, Outrageous Fortune
  - Murray Keane, Interrogation

Achievement in Directing, Documentary

- Peta Carey, Lifting of the Makutu
  - Leanne Pooley, The Promise
  - Gaylene Preston, Earthquake

Achievement in Directing, Factual/Entertainment/Reality

- Mark Albiston, The Living Room, series 3
  - Jane Andrews, Intrepid Journeys "Cuba With Kim Hill"
  - Melanie Rakena, Off the Rails – A Love Story

Achievement in Camerawork, Drama

- Simon Baumfield, The Insider's Guide To Love
  - Grant McKinnon, The Market
  - David Paul, The Insider's Guide To Love

Achievement in Camerawork, Documentary

- Wayne Vinten, The Promise
  - Renaud Maire, Lifting of the Makutu
  - Michael O'Connor, Black Grace – From Cannon's Creek to Jacob's Pillow

Achievement in Editing, Drama

- Lisa Hough, Interrogation
  - Nicola Smith, Outrageous Fortune
  - Paul Sutorius, The Insider's Guide To Love

Achievement in Editing, Documentary

- Ken Sparks, Black Grace – From Cannon's Creek to Jacob's Pillow
  - Mark Taylor, High Times
  - Tim Woodhouse, The Promise

Achievement in Original Music

- David Long, The Insider's Guide To Love
  - Jonathan Besser, Whirimako Black, Oliver Mtukudzi, Lands of Our Fathers – My African Legacy
  - Plan 9: David Donaldson, Stephen Roche, Janet Roddick, Earthquake

Contribution to a Soundtrack

- Melanie Graham, Polly McKinnon, Mike Hedges, Earthquake
  - Steve Finnigan, Tom Miskin, Outrageous Fortune
  - Ian Leslie, Chris Todd, Ray Beentjes, Frontier of Dreams

Achievement in Production Design

- Ant Sang, bro'Town
  - Clayton Ercolano, Outrageous Fortune
  - Brett Schwieters, Interrogation

Contribution to Design

- Nic Smillie, The Insider's Guide To Love
  - Karl Butler, The Survivor Files
  - Alex Kennedy (Kennedy Model Making), Facelift, series 3
