= Adam Gardiner (actor) =

New Zealand actor (born 1966)

- Born: 13 December 1966 (age 59); Auckland, New Zealand
- Education: Victoria University of Wellington (BFA)
- Occupation: Actor
- Years active: 1996–present
- Known for: Power Rangers

Adam Gardiner (born 13 December 1966) is a New Zealand voice, film, and television actor, most notable for his voice roles in Power Rangers. He voiced the Evil White Ranger Clone in Power Rangers Dino Thunder, Kamdor in Power Rangers Operation Overdrive, and Sledge in Power Rangers Dino Charge.

== Early life and education ==
Gardiner was born on 13 December 1966 in Auckland.

He graduated from Victoria University of Wellington in 1995 with a Bachelor of Arts in Theatre and Film.

== Filmography ==
=== Film ===
- Hopeless (2000) as Richard
- For Good (2003) as Flatmate
- Futile Attraction (2004) as Chef
- River Queen (2005) as Baine's Lieutenant
- Eagle vs Shark (2007) as Tony

=== Television ===
- Duggan (1999) as Robert MacLllwaine (1 episode: "Going Overboard")
- Lovebites (2002) as Richard
- The Strip (2002-2003) as Slater (3 episodes)
- Power Rangers Dino Thunder (2004) as White Ranger Clone (voice) (10 episodes)
- Outrageous Fortune (2005) as Murray (1 episode: "The Fat Weed That Roots Itself")
- Power Rangers Mystic Force (2006) as Chimera #1 (voice) (2 episodes)
- Power Rangers Operation Overdrive (2007) as Kamdor (voice) (14 episodes)/ Loki (1 episode: "It's Hammer Time")
- Power Rangers Jungle Fury (2008) as Toady (voice) (3 episodes)
- Burying Brian (2008) as Suit #1 (1 episode)
- Longing for New Zealand (2009) as Pilot (Television film)
- Go Girls (2009) as Lesley (1 episode: Dream Believers)
- The Rogers Family Xmas (2010) as Kent
- The Almighty Johnsons (2011) as Brian (1 episode: "Bad Things Happen")
- Tangiwai (2011) as Frank Mooney (Television film)
- Bliss (2011) as Charles the Manservant (Television film)
- Power Rangers Samurai (2012) as Skarf (voice) (1 episode: "Kevin's Choice")
- Siege (2012) as Nigel Formosa (Television film)
- Sunny Skies (2013) as Lawyer (1 episode)
- Spartacus: War of the Damned (2013) as Mummius (1 episode: "Men of Honor")
- Agent Anna (2013–present) as Leon Cruickshank (Main cast, 6 episodes)
- Power Rangers Megaforce (2013-2014) as Shadow Serpent (voice) (1 episode: "Man and Machine") and Cybaxx (voice) (1 episode: "Earth Fights Back")
- Power Rangers Dino Charge (2015-2016) as Sledge (voice) (25 episodes) and Reporter (2 episodes: "Besties 4Eva!", "Catching Some Rays")
- Power Rangers Super Ninja Steel (2018) as Sledge (voice) (2 episodes: "Echoes of Evil", "The Poisy Show") and Agent 00 Sven (1 episode: "Car Trouble")
- Power Rangers Beast Morphers (2020) as Sledge (voice) (2 episodes: "Finders Keepers", "Making Bad")
- Spartacus: House of Ashur (2026-) as Servius (1 episode)
