= Mee-Shee: The Water Giant =

- Directed by: John Henderson
- Written by: Barry Authors
- Produced by: Barry Authors; Rainer Mockert; Gary Hannam; Ken Tuohy
- Starring: Bruce Greenwood; Daniel Magder; Tom Jackson; Joel Tobeck; Rena Owen; Jacinta Wawatai
- Cinematography: John Ignatius
- Edited by: Bill Jones; David Yardley
- Music by: Pol Brennan
- Distributed by: Screen Media Ventures (Canada); Universal Pictures (United Kingdom); ContentFilm (Germany)
- Release date: 28 June 2005
- Running time: 90 minutes
- Country: United Kingdom; Germany; Canada
- Language: English
- Budget: $40 million

Mee-Shee: The Water Giant (also known simply as Mee-Shee) is a British-German family film shot in New Zealand in 2002 and released in 2005. It stars Bruce Greenwood, Rena Owen, Tom Jackson and Daniel Magder.

The film is based on the Canadian folklore water monster, known as the Ogopogo. This folklore started with Aboriginal peoples in Canada, and while the film was in production complaints from one Aboriginal chief about cultural appropriation caused the film and its title monster to be renamed "Mee-Shee". These complaints and the renaming drew media attention and generated controversy.

The film itself received some good reviews. Some critics praised the performances, although evaluations of the special effects were mixed. In Canada, Mee-Shee was only released on DVD and never played in theatres.

== Plot ==
A U.S. oil company loses a drill, intended to do work in the Arctic while flying over a Canadian lake. Company employee Sean is contacted to go to Canada to find it; however, he has to cancel plans to take his son to Walt Disney World. Although his son, Mac, is disappointed, he agrees to go with his father to Canada. Once in Canada, they meet a local native named Custer who helps Sean and another employee on their mission.

They visit the lake using a submarine, and after taking pictures of the bottom of the lake discover incredibly deep giant rivers. The legend of Mee-Shee says that the rivers lead to the ocean. Sean and Mac rent the home of Mrs. Coogan, a kindly lady whom Sean refers to as "Mary Poppins".

Mac, Sean, and others see vague images of Mee-Shee that spark their curiosity. Upon meeting Custer's daughter Pawnee, Mac goes with her to a cave where local native woman "Crazy Norma" feeds Mee-Shee. This is where they first meet the unique creature. Mac runs back to the house to tell his father, but Mrs. Coogan warns that Mee-Shee's life could be endangered if the outside world knew of it.

Meanwhile, saboteurs Snead and Watkins, agents of a rival oil company who pose as Greenpeace representatives, destroy Sean's equipment and search for the drill themselves. Their first time under the water, they see Mee-Shee and shoot him with a harpoon. When Mac finds him again in the cave he removes the harpoon and tells environmental ranger Laura about it. Events lead to a search for Mee-Shee and conflicts with the saboteurs. The saboteurs capture Mee-Shee and attempt to kill him, but an even larger Mee-Shee appears, meaning that the one in the net is a baby and the larger one is an adult. Enraged, the mother attacks the saboteurs and kills them. Out of gratitude, the baby Mee-Shee retrieves the drill but they decide that they don't want it and throw it back. All of a sudden, eight more members of Mee-Shee's family appear out of the water, both old and young (showing that there's more than one).

== Production ==
=== Background ===
According to regional folklore, the Ogopogo is a creature that lives in Okanagan Lake in British Columbia. It has been compared to the Loch Ness Monster, another supposed water creature in Scotland, or with a plesiosaur. Aboriginal peoples have claimed that belief in the Ogopogo is a part of their culture, although they called it Niataka or N'ha-aitk, and the name "Ogopogo" was invented by a board of trade in 1926. The folklore has also been commercialized, inspired merchandise, and drew tourism for the Okanagan. With this commercialization, one reporter found it natural that the Ogopogo would also inspire a film, saying that "Eventually movie makers were bound to sit up and take notice, and movie makers did".

Canadian screenwriter Barry Authors wrote the screenplay for Mee-Shee after reading about the Ogopogo in a magazine. It was written in 1996, and originally entitled Loch, a Scottish Gaelic word for "lake", but not filmed until six years later. Authors resided in Britain at the time but eventually opted for a more Canadian feel and renamed his work Ogopogo. Authors also wanted to portray his film as a "showcase for Canadian talent and storytelling" and "a cross between Free Willy and E.T.".

=== Filming ===
The film version was directed by John Henderson, who had previously directed Loch Ness (1996) about similar folklore in Scotland. They first made plans to film the story on Okanagan Lake, the rumoured domain of the Ogopogo, but had troubles with the scenery and relocated to Lake Winnipeg. US actress Whoopi Goldberg was initially going to play a Native Canadian, which would require makeup since Goldberg is a US black woman. However, due to concerns that Lake Manitoba might experience a winter, the project was moved to New Zealand. Goldberg was unwilling to travel there and left the project. Authors' son Jeff Authors, who had worked on the White Fang TV show, had suggested New Zealand, saying "New Zealand can double for Canada. Not only is it beautiful, but it looks just like Canada in all the remote spots you want, and you'll probably find a more remote lake there".

The creature itself was created by Jim Henson's Creature Shop using both CGI and puppetry and modeled after the late US actor Walter Matthau. The film cost $40 million. The filming in New Zealand took place on Lake Wakatipu at Queenstown in 2002. Authors remarked it was nice to work in New Zealand because "The crews were very, very keen to do anything that was required... New Zealand had just done Lord of the Rings, and they had a taste of major motion pictures". Other filming was done in England with a water tank, and the computer work was carried out in England between 2003 and 2004.

=== Naming controversy ===
According to Barry Authors, most Aboriginal-Canadian leaders were supported while using the name "Ogopogo" in the film. However, one Aboriginal complained that the legend was too holy, so Authors renamed the creature "Mee-Shee". The Aboriginal who did not want the name "Ogopogo" used was Stewart Phillip, a Penticton chief. Phillip asked that the names "Ogopogo" and "Okanagan" not be used because "It's an international concern among indigenous people about the exploitation of spiritual entities and being and whatnot for commercial purposes. This is not an isolated incident". The Māori people, natives in New Zealand who owned the land on which the filming was taking place, supported Phillip. Phillip's requests attracted some media attention and generated debate. One newspaper writer accused Phillip of "xenophobia" threatening "free speech". This writer suggested that Aboriginal cultures can be "respected", but others can still appropriate the cultures because "Nobody owns a culture". The well-known Canadian writer W.P. Kinsella weighed in on the issue, criticizing the name change by saying, "Filmmakers can tell any story they want any time they want, and they don't need permission from these troublemakers... Make the movie. F*** them all". A Canadian scientist, Ed Bousfield, even objected to Aboriginal claims to the Ogopogo because he felt the Ogopogo was real. (At the same time, Bousfield attacked non-believers, accusing his "ivory tower colleagues" of "the worst kind of scientific elitism".)

Conversely, The Vancouver Sun suggested that "Obviously, we're best off when native people tell native stories. Witness Atanarjuat: The Fast Runner, the debut film of Inuit film". Meanwhile, the Ogopogo "joins Santa Claus and Christ as cultural icons that have been so celebrated and abused it's hard to view them as any particular group's property". Thus, this newspaper suggested that Barry Authors should be pleased that with this incident, he "raised awareness of the Ogopogo's cultural importance to native people" while the film itself would be "a trifling confection of no particular consequence". Writer Randy Boswell connected this debate with similar controversies over appropriation that had been going on for over a decade and also noted Aboriginals had been previously upset with a contest to catch or photograph the Ogopogo in 2001.

=== Cast ===
When the film was to be made in Manitoba, a local executive Kim Todd told the press that she expected the project would attract major US celebrities, as well as actors from Canada. The cast ultimately comprised:

- Bruce Greenwood as Sean Cambell. The Canadian magazine Maclean's reported in 2002 that Greenwood, a Canadian actor, had joined the cast. Maclean's also noted that Greenwood had previously played US President John F. Kennedy in the film Thirteen Days (2000).
- Daniel Magder as Mac Cambell. Madger is another Canadian actor. His audition was included in the DVD, and it was done when Mee-Shee was still named "Ogopogo".
- Tom Jackson as Custer
- Joel Tobeck as Snead. Tobeck plays a villain, and one critic remarked that he conveyed "some of the best pure-evil villainy".
- Rena Owen as Crazy Norma. Owen is a Māori actress who had previously starred in the film Once Were Warriors (1990). She assumed the role that Whoopi Goldberg would have played.
- Phyllida Law as Mrs. Coogan.
- Luanne Gordon as Laura.
- Joe Pingue as Neilds.
- Jacinta Wawatai-Woodhouse as Pawnee

== Release ==
Mee-Shee premiered in London on 28 June 2005. In the Czech Republic, it was released on 14 July and in May 2006, it reached the Philippines and Russia. In New York City in 2006, the film was played at the Tribeca Film Festival.

While the film was released in some theatres all over the world, in Canada, it was only released on DVD in July 2006. Authors wanted the film to run in theatres, but remarked that "We got caught up in an unfortunate series of events that's very upsetting". He also said the German producers were responsible for the film not playing in theatres. Later, in October 2006, the film ran in the Fantasy Worldwide Film Festival in Toronto, with one journalist calling it "a family-oriented feature about a giant whale".

== Soundtrack ==
The end credits of the film feature the song "Do You Find" performed by Dreambard and sung by Tara Ni Bihrion. "Sunday Morning Blues" with lyrics by Barry Authors and music by Roger Spoooer features in the film itself with composed music by Pol Brennan.

== Reception ==
In 2002, Maclean's discussed the film and described the Ogopogo creature/legend as a success since it was "ready for a $32-million movie close-up". The blurb also read, "Move over, Nessie", referring to the Loch Ness Monster. Ultimately, Maclean's critic Brian D. Johnson called Mee-Shee a "good yarn" and complimented the acting and setting. However, he claimed that some of the special effects looked "pretty cartoonish". Johnson and a few other Canadian critics also pointed out the irony in the fact that British Columbia has been used in films to portray other places, but this time another place was portraying British Columbia.

One Allmovie critic writes that Mee-Shee is "delightful", approving of some of the special effects and comparing Mee-Shee's appearance to "a plesiosaur, a manatee, a walrus, etc.", although he adds that the CGI is "sloppy" at times. He says that the creature can fuel a person's "curiosity and interest" and the storyline works even though it is typical in describing a man who almost never has time for his son. Like Johnson, Allmovie critic also approved of the acting. The Penticton Western News also called it a "good family adventure". This newspaper explained that the creature is "well done", the story was "good" and the film "is no more violent than Lion King or any other Disney movie".

== See also ==
- Magic in the Water (1995)
- Loch Ness (1996)
- The Water Horse: Legend of the Deep (2007)
