= Paolo Rotondo =

New Zealand director, writer and actor

Paolo Rotondo is a New Zealand director, writer and actor of stage and screen.

== Biography ==
Rotondo was born in Naples, Italy, from a Neapolitan father and New Zealand mother of Irish descent. He grew up in Italy and moved to New Zealand when he was eleven.

As an actor, Rotondo is best known for his character Andrew Solomon on the New Zealand soap opera Shortland Street. In 2016 he released his debut feature film "Orphans & Kingdoms" to great critical acclaim. He was a lead in the New Zealand feature film Stickmen. Television roles include on Xena: Warrior Princess, and When We Go to War. He was nominated for TV Guide Best actor' on two occasions. In 2016 Paolo played Johnny Torrio, Al Capone's infamous mentor in the US Television series The Making of the Mob: Chicago.

As a writer Rotondo has written for film and theatre. The short films The Freezer and Dead Letters were both supported by the New Zealand Film Commission and are studied in New Zealand high schools. Plays he has written include Little Che inspired by The Motorcycle Diaries and Strange Resting Places co-written with Rob Mokaraka, produced by Taki Rua Productions and based on family stories of the Māori Battalion in Italy in World War II. Strange Resting Places was performed for over nine years and been published by Playmarket. It was also the opening feature-length episode of the six-part television series Atamira. It aired on Māori TV on 25 April 2012 at 8.30pm.

As a TV Commercial Director Paolo is represented by Flying Fish films New Zealand. He directed the film Orphans and Kingdoms which was released for general exhibition in April 2016.

He lives in the Hawkes Bay with his partner Renee Mark and their two children.

Rotondo and Mark run a regular national film festival called Cinema Italiano: The Italian Film Festival.

== Directing credits ==
- Orphans & Kingdoms - Feature Film
- The Freezer - Short Film
- Dead Letters (Adaptation)

== Writing credits ==
=== Film ===
- The Freezer (2003) - Short Film
- Dead Letters (Adaptation) (2006)
- Orphans & Kingdoms (2014) - Feature Film

=== Theatre ===
- Little Che
- Strange Resting Places (co-written with Rob Mokaraka)
- Black Hands

== Acting ==
=== Television ===
- Xena: Warrior Princess: Philius
- Cleopatra 2525: Porter
- The Insiders Guide to Happiness: Tim
- Serial Killers: Bevan
- Shortland Street: Andrew Solomon
- When We Go to War (2015): Alonso Moretti. Director Pete Burger
- Cancerman: Milan Brych
- Street Legal
- Jackson's Wharf
- Perfectly Frank - The Life of a NZ Writer
- The Call Up
- The Strip
- Spin Doctors
- Riverworld
- The Luminaries (2020): Aubert Gascoigne

=== Theatre ===
- Tartuffe: Tartuffe - Silo Theatre
- The Agony and Ecstasy of Steve Jobs: Performer for Silo Theatre
- Little Dog Laughed Silo Theatre
- Black Hands: Writer/Actor/Producer
- Little Che: Writer/Actor/Producer
- Strange Resting Places: Writer/Actor - Taki Rua Productions
- Peer Gynt Narrator for Auckland Philharmonia
- Mr. Marmalade: Bradley - Auckland Theatre Company
- Twelfth Night: Sebastian - Auckland Theatre Company
- Fond Love and Kisses: Rob - Downstage Theatre
- The Butchers' Daughter: Emilian & Others
- A Streetcar Named Desire: Pablo Gonzales - Auckland Theatre Company
- Dog - Silo Theatre
- NeverNever - BATS
- The Young Baron Biaggio - Maidment Theatre
- Accidental Death of an Anarchist: Madman - Maidment Theatre
- Coriolanus: Brutus - Maidment Theatre
- Nowhere Fast: Bevan - Maidment Theatre
- Round About Thursday: Roger - Maidment Theatre

=== Film ===
- The Ugly: Simon Cartwright
- Young Hercules: Enya
- Stickmen: Thomas
- Riverworld: Flavius
- The Rule of Jenny Pen: Psychologist

=== Voice-over ===
- Power Rangers Mystic Force: Snow Prince
- Power Rangers Dino Charge: Duplicon
- Path of Exile: Daresso

== Awards ==
- Rome Fantastic Film Festival Fantafestival (1997) Best Actor: for The Ugly
- Air New Zealand Screen Awards (2006) Best Script - Short Film: for Dead Letters
- Chapman Tripp Theatre Awards (2007) - Winner - Best New Playwright - Strange Resting Places
- Chapman Tripp Theatre Awards (2007) - Nomination - Production Of The Year - Strange Resting Places
- Museum and New Zealand Society of Authors Research grant (2015)
- TV Guide Best on the Box People's Choice - Best Actor - Milan Brych - Cancerman
- TV Guide Best on the Box People's Choice Nomination - Best Actor - The Insiders Guide to Happiness
- Shakespeare Globe International Artistic Fellowship
- New Zealand Italian Film Scholarship (organised by Tony Lambert)
