= Federico Spoliansky =

Argentine filmmaker, poet and writer

Federico Spoliansky is an Argentine poet and licensed psychologist (University of Buenos Aires) born to a British mother and Dr. Ruben Spoliansky, a recognized psychiatrist who began his career as a surgeon. Federico holds a MA degree in Filmmaking (London Film School). He has published several books: El Agujero (1995), Duda Patrón (2010) and Atlántov (2016).

In 2017, he won a scholarship from the National Arts Fund and went as Visiting Scholar to Brown University.
