= Scott Wills =

New Zealand actor

Scott Wills is a New Zealand actor who has starred in several films and has also appeared on television and theatre. He won twice the prize of the best actor in New Zealand film and television awards.

== Life and career ==
Wills studied at Massey University in Palmerston North and completed a Bachelor of Arts in English and Media Studies in 1992. Then he attended the Toi Whakaari for two years, graduation with a Diploma in Acting in 1994. He had his start on television in 1992 with an appearance in the soap opera Shortland Street, playing Philip Cotton, who had an obsession with Alison Raynor. In 1997, he was awarded the Chapman Tripp Best Newcomer award for his role in Mojo.

In 2000, he is named for New Zealand Film Award of the best actor in a supporting role for his role in the romantic comedy Hopeless. In 2001 he starred in his first major film, Stickmen, a comedy that achieved commercial success in New Zealand and for which he won the New Zealand Film Award of the best actor. He returned to television in different TV series and, in 2006, he co-starred in Perfect Creature. In 2008, he won his second New Zealand Film Award for best actor for his role in Apron Strings, a familial drama. In 2009, he played the Head of Security of a mysterious cult in the TV series The Cult. In 2013, he staged his first play, Bus Stop.

== Filmography ==
=== Film ===
- 1997 – The Ugly as Simon's victim
- 2000 – Hopeless as Phil
- 2001 – Stickmen as Wayne
- 2005 – Boogeyman as Co-worker
- 2006 – Perfect Creature as Det. Jones
- 2008 – Apron Strings as Barry

=== TV work ===
- 1992 – Shortland Street – Philip Cotton
- 1999 – Duggan – Const. Kendrick
- 2002 – Lovebites - Phil Hope
- 2002 – Street Legal – Johnny Watts
- 2004 – Power Rangers Dino Thunder – Termitetron (voice)
- 2005 – Interrogation – Detective Constable Terry Skinner
- 2006 – Doves of War (mini-series) – Brad McKecknie
- 2008 – Burying Brian – Warren
- 2008 – Legend of the Seeker – Briggs
- 2009 – The Cult – Saul
- 2010 – Stolen (TV movie) – Detective Inspector Stuart Wildon
- 2011 – Underbelly NZ: Land of the Long Green Cloud – Detective Clive Pilborough
- 2012 – Safe House (TV movie) – D.C Lewis
- 2013 – Power Rangers Megaforce – Distractor/Rico the Robot (voices)
- 2015 – Power Rangers Dino Charge – Gold Digger (voice)
- 2016 – Power Rangers Dino Super Charge – Spell Digger/Gold Digger (voices)
- 2018 – Power Rangers Super Ninja Steel – Putrid (voice)
