= Anapela Polataivao =

New Zealand actor, director and writer

Anapela Polataivao ONZM
- Born: Samoa
- Occupations: Actor, writer, director
- Known for: Pani and Pani
- Notable work: Night Shift

Anapela Polataivao ONZM is a New Zealand actor, comedian, writer, and director of stage and screen.

== Background ==
Polataivao was born in Samoa and has heritage from Vailoa, Vaiusu, Fagae'e and Safune. She grew up in South Auckland.

== Career ==
Polataivao began acting at the age of eight. She was part of the Maidment Youth Theatre at the University of Auckland and graduated from the New Zealand drama school Toi Whakaari with a Bachelor of Performing Arts (Acting) in 2000.

In 2002, she formed the theatre group Kila Kokonut Krew with Vela Manusaute. Together they created the musical The Factory which became a web series in 2014. The show toured throughout Australia and had a five-week run at the 2014 Edinburgh Fringe Festival.

With Goretti Chadwick Polataivao created the comedy duo Pani and Pani. They also created and present the Māori Television show, Game of Bros.

Polataivao worked as acting tutor at PIPA (Pacific Institute of Performing Arts) until PIPA closed at the end of 2017 when the BEST Pacific Institute of Education went into liquidation.

A theatre play directed by Polataivao, Wild Dogs Under My Skirt by Tusiata Avia was re-worked in 2016 from a solo to an ensemble cast creating an award-winning production that went on to be presented at the New Zealand Festival in 2018, a national New Zealand tour in 2019 and at the SoHo Playhouse in New York off-Broadway in January 2020.

In 2024, she starred in Tinā as a dissatisfied substitute teacher, recently bereaved after the 2011 Christchurch earthquake, who begins working at an elite private school and starts a student choir.

=== Filmography ===
Year	Title	Role	Notes
1995	Tala Pasifika	Actress – Losa	Television
2005	The Market	Actress – Ina Lima	Television
2006–2007	KTV	Writer, producer	Television
2009	The Cult	Actress – Motel Owner	Television
2010	Eruption	Actress – Ana	Television
2011–current	Fresh	Actress – Pani	Television
2012	Night Shift	Actress – Salote	Short film
2013	The Factory	Executive Producer, Original Writer, Actress – Lily	Web, episode 1–10
2016–current	Game of Bros	Creator, presenter	Television, episode 1
2016	One Thousand Ropes	Actor	Film
2021	The Justice of Bunny King	Actor	Film
2023	Our Flag Means Death	Actor – Auntie	Television, Season 2, episodes 1-8
2023	Shortland Street	Actor – Hanalei To'a	Television, Guest Role December
2024	The Rule of Jenny Pen	Actor – Carer Jasmine	Film
2024	Tinā	Actor – Mareta Percival	Film

=== Theatre ===
- Frangipani Perfume by Makerita Urale, director Rachel House – actor
- My Name is Gary Cooper by Victor Rodger -–actor
- Club Paradiso by Victor Rodger – actor
- Where We Once Belonged by Sia Figel – actor
- Wild Dogs Under My Skirt by Tusiata Avia – director
- Taro King by Vela Manusaute (2012) – producer (as part of the Kila Kokonut Krew's 10th anniversary celebrations)
- Girl on a Corner by Victor Rodger (2015) – director
- Uma Lava by Victor Rodger (2017) – actor
- Monster in the Maze (2025) - director

== Honours and awards ==
In the 2006 Air New Zealand Screen Awards she was nominated for Best Supporting Actress for her role in The Market.

For her role in Night Shift Polataivao won Best Actress at the 2013 24fps International Short Film Festival in Texas and the StarNow Best Actor award at the 2012 Show Me Shorts Film Festival.

With Vela Manusaute, she received the New Generation Award for theatre at the 2014 Arts Foundation Awards.

Theatre directing awards include Best Director at the Auckland Theatre Awards in 2016 for the Wild Dogs Under My Skirt by Tusiata Avia. Auckland Fringe Festival Best Director award (2015) for Girl on a Corner by Victor Rodger.

In 2019 she won the Contemporary Pacific Art Award at the Arts Pasifika Awards.

In the 2024 King’s Birthday Honours, Polataivao was appointed an Officer of the New Zealand Order of Merit, for services to Pacific performing arts.
