= Backch@t =

New Zealand reality television

- Presented by: Bill Ralston
- Country of origin: New Zealand
- No. of episodes: 75

Production
- Executive producer: Dave Gibson
- Producer: Gordon Harcourt
- Camera setup: Multiple-camera setup
- Running time: 90 minutes (1998-1999); 60 minutes (2000)
- Production company: Gibson Group

Original release
- Network: TVNZ
- Release: 22 March 1998 – 20 August 2000

Backchat (stylised as Backch@t) is a New Zealand arts and culture show that aired from 1998 until 2000 on TV One. The show was hosted by Bill Ralston with movie reviews by Chris Knox. It had won Best Lifestyle Programme at the New Zealand Film and Television Awards for all the years that it aired. It also won Best Television Media Programme at the 1999 Qantas Media Awards.

== Background ==
First aired on 22 March 1998, Backch@t looked at the arts and culture through a broad current affairs lens with each episode focusing around panel discussions, magazine-style segments, topical interviews and film, music and book reviews.

Each episode was initially 90 minutes long and screened at 12:00 pm on Sunday afternoons, with a repeat screening at around 10:30 pm that night. Within two years, the show was reduced in duration to an hour long and screened at around 10:30 pm on Sunday nights.

Backch@t ended on 20 August 2000 and ran for a total of 75 episodes over its three-year run. It was produced by the Gibson Group for TVNZ with funding from NZ On Air.

Reporters included Mark Crysell (1998–2000), Miriama Kamo (1998–2000) and Jodi Ihaka (2000).
