= Dave Gibson (producer) =

New Zealand television producer

Dave Gibson ONZM
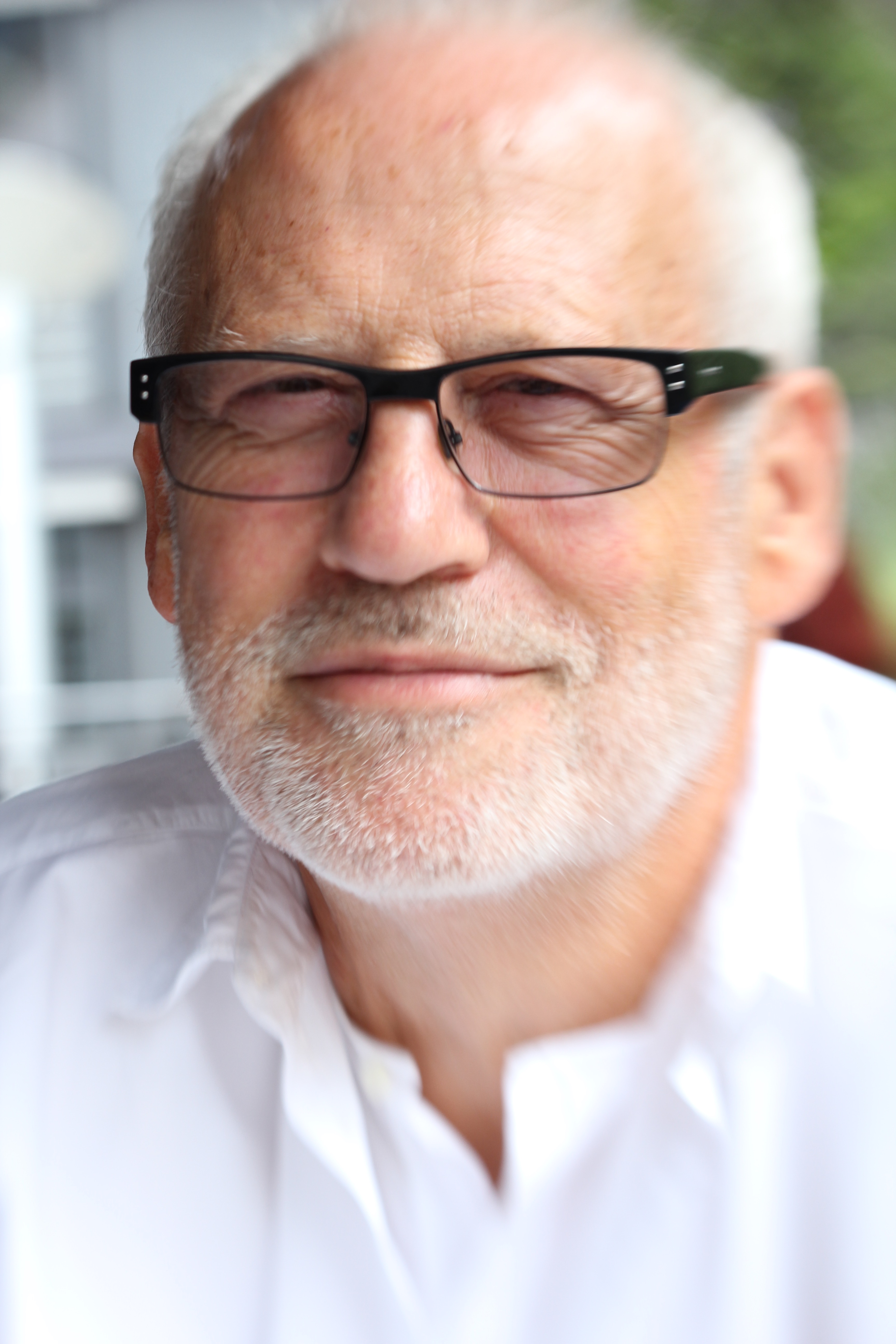
- Gibson in 2013
- Born: David Timothy Gibson; 1950s Pahiatua, New Zealand
- Occupation(s): producer, director

David Timothy Gibson ONZM (born 1950s) is the founder of New Zealand film production company The Gibson Group. After its sale in 2013 to his business partners, he was appointed CEO of the New Zealand Film Commission.

== Early life ==
Gibson was born in Pahiatua to Christabel Gibson, a schoolteacher and later lecturer, and David Maurice Gibson, a farmer. He studied at St Patrick's College, Silverstream, a boys’ boarding college in Upper Hutt. He began a teaching degree at Wellington College of Education in Karori, but left after six weeks for a degree at Victoria University of Wellington in education and English. During this time, Gibson started experimenting with film. He purchased a Super 8 film camera and began filming his friends at concerts and producing short pieces for the University's Drama Society.

== Career ==
While still enrolled at Victoria University, Gibson began part-time work for the New Zealand Broadcasting Corporation. This mainly involved labour, moving sets from Avalon Studios in Lower Hutt to the corporation's Waring Taylor Street locations.

In 1977, Gibson left his degree unfinished and established Gibson Films, in a rented office on Courtenay Place in Wellington. He began mining the genre of educational films, which he would then sell to schools and educational film distributors. One early piece about two children living on a high country sheep station sold to Encyclopædia Britannica.

In the 1980s Gibson Films rebranded to The Gibson Group, and their genre offering widened. Early productions included The Silent One, an adaptation of the Joy Cowley novel of the same name, filmed entirely on the small island of Aitutaki in the Pacific. It was also the first New Zealand feature film directed solely by a woman. During this period, sketch comedy also became one of the mediums Gibson Group became known for. Satirical puppet show Public Eye, inspired by the UK show Spitting Image, proved popular despite having to be toned down for New Zealand audiences. Other genres included magazine-style shows The Edge (1993–94), Sunday (1995–97), B@ckchat' (1998–2000) and Frontseat (2004–2007).

Throughout the 1990s and into the 2000s, The Gibson Group broadened their mediums to work with interactive museum exhibitions both in New Zealand and overseas, including Our Space at Museum of New Zealand Te Papa Tongarewa. The popular children's shows The Simon Eliot Show and MyStory used cellphones and technology to let the audience interact with the host. MyStory was New Zealand's first show screened in a 'mobisode' format.

Gibson's other notable productions include two natural disaster dramas for television. Aftershock (2008), an earthquake drama accompanied by a documentary and website about earthquake safety. This was followed by Eruption (2010), set in Auckland's volcanic landscape.

In the 2012 Queen's Birthday and Diamond Jubilee Honours, Gibson was appointed an Officer of the New Zealand Order of Merit, for services to the film and television industry.

In 2013, Gibson was appointed CEO of the New Zealand Film Commission. During his tenure the commission granted funding for successful New Zealand films such as Tickled, Poi E: The Story of Our Song, Mahana, and Pork Pie.

Gibson is currently a board member of the Wellington Regional Economic Development Agency.

In June 2017, Gibson announced that he would be stepping down from the role of CEO. In a statement, Gibson said "I've thoroughly enjoyed the last few years but have always believed CEO's [sic] shouldn't stay too long in organisations like the NZFC. I'm not sure what I'll do next."

== Filmography ==
Title	Year	Credited as	Notes
Title	Year	Producer	Notes
The Old Man's Story	1979	Yes	Short film
Blackhearted Barney Blackfoot	1980	Yes	Short film
The Silent One	1985	Yes	
The Irrefutable Truth about Demons	2000	Yes	
Cowboys & Communists	2007	Yes	Documentary film
We Do Things Differently Here	2011	Yes	Short film
Fresh Meat	2012	Yes	
The Last Ocean	2012	No	Documentary film Executive producer

=== Television ===
The numbers in writing credits refer to the number of episodes.

Title	Year	Credited as		Network	Notes
Title	Year	Director	Producer	Network	Notes
Hunchin' Down the Track	1980	No	Yes		Documentary film
The Monster's Christmas	1981	No	Yes	Television One	Television film
Nearly No Christmas	1983	No	Yes		Television film First assistant director
Cuckoo Land	1986	No	Yes	Television 2	Assistant director
The Haunting of Barney Palmer	1987	No	Yes	PBS	Television film
Public Eye	1988–89	Yes (6)	Yes	Television One	
Jean: The Ballet of Jean Batten	1990	No	Yes	Television One	Television film
Away Laughing	1992	No	Yes	TV3	
Undercover	1991	No	Yes	Channel 2	Television film
Bungay on Crime	1992	No	Yes	TV One	
Skitz	1993–97	No	Yes	TV3	
Typhon's People	1993	No	Yes		Television film
Bitter Calm	1994	No	Yes		Television film
Rugged Gold	1994	No	Co-producer	The Family Channel	Television film
Mirror, Mirror	1995–98	No	Yes	TV One; Network Ten	
Telly Laughs	1996–98	No	Yes	TV3	
Duggan	1997	No	Yes	TV One	
One Man's Poison	1998	Yes	Yes	TV2	Television film
Newsflash	1998–2000	No	Yes	TV2	
Tiger Country	1998	No	Yes	TV3	Television film
The Semisis	1998	No	Co-producer	TV3	
Clare	2001	No	Yes	TV One	Television film Also writer
The Strip	2002–03	No	Yes	TV3	
The Insiders Guide to Happiness	2004	No	Yes	TV2	
Helping Hands	2005	Yes	Yes		Documentary film
Holly's Heroes	2005	No	Yes	TV2	
The Insider's Guide to Love	2005	No	Yes	TV2	
The Hothouse	2007	No	Yes	TV One	
Time Trackers	2008	No	Yes	Seven Network; TV2	
Aftershock	2008	No	Yes	TV3	Television film
Paradise Café	2009–11	No	Yes	CBBC; TV2	
Ben & Jeremy's Big Road Trip	2010	No	Yes	TV3	Television film Executive producer
Eruption	2010	No	Yes	TV3	Television film
Panic at Rock Island	2011	No	Yes	TV2	Television film

==== Executive producer-only ====
Title	Year	Network	Notes
The Enduring Land	1990		Docuseries
Shark in the Park	1990–91	Television One	Series 2–3
The Edge	1993–94	TV3	
Cover Story	1994–96	TV3	
Sunday	1995–97		
Backch@t	1998–2000	TV One	
Dating Violence	1999	TV2	Documentary film
Bookenz	1999–2000	TV One	
No. 8 Wired	2000–04	TV3	
Op' Stars	2000	TV One	Documentary film
A Tale of Three Chimps	2001	TV3	Documentary film
To Age or Not to Age	2001	TV One	Documentary film
Tutus & Town Halls	2001	TV One	Documentary film
Who Ate All the Pies?	2002	TV One	Documentary film
In Search of the Moa	2003	TV2	Documentary film
50 Years on Their Toes	2003	TV One	Documentary film
Cartoonists Inc	2003	TV One	Documentary film
Long Lost Sons	2004	TV One	Documentary film
Frontseat	2004–07	TV One	
Facelift	2004–07	TV One	
Dare to Be Free	2004	TV One	Documentary film
Tough Act	2006	TV2	Docuseries
Here to Stay	2007–08	TV One	Docuseries
The Simon Eliot Show	2007	TV3	
Welcome to Paradise	2007	Prime	
Aftershock – Would You Survive?	2008	TV3	Documentary film
How to Spot a Cult	2009	TV3	Documentary film
Poking the Borax	2011	TV3	
Operation Hero	2011–13	TV2	Series 1–3
Street Hospital	2013	TV2	Docuseries; Series 1
Survive Aotearoa	2013	Māori Television	Docuseries
Prison Families	2013	TV3	Docuseries
Dragons in a Distant Land	2013		Docuseries
War News	2014	Prime	
