= Luanne Gordon =

New Zealand actress

- Born: New Zealand
- Occupation: Actress

Luanne Gordon is a New Zealand actress. She won the 2001 Nokia New Zealand Film Award for Best Supporting Actress for her role in Stickmen and was nominated for the 2006 Air New Zealand Screen Award for Best Performance by an Actress for her role in Interrogation.

Gordon plays lead roles of Detective Sergeant Angela Darley in Interrogation, Melissa Walker in The Strip and Kim/Courtney in Sensation.

Other screen roles include the Lulu in Stickmen, Ginny in Hope and Wire, Laura in Mee-Shee: The Water Giant and Margaret Bain in Black Hands.
