= Ant Sang =

Chinese New Zealander comic book artist

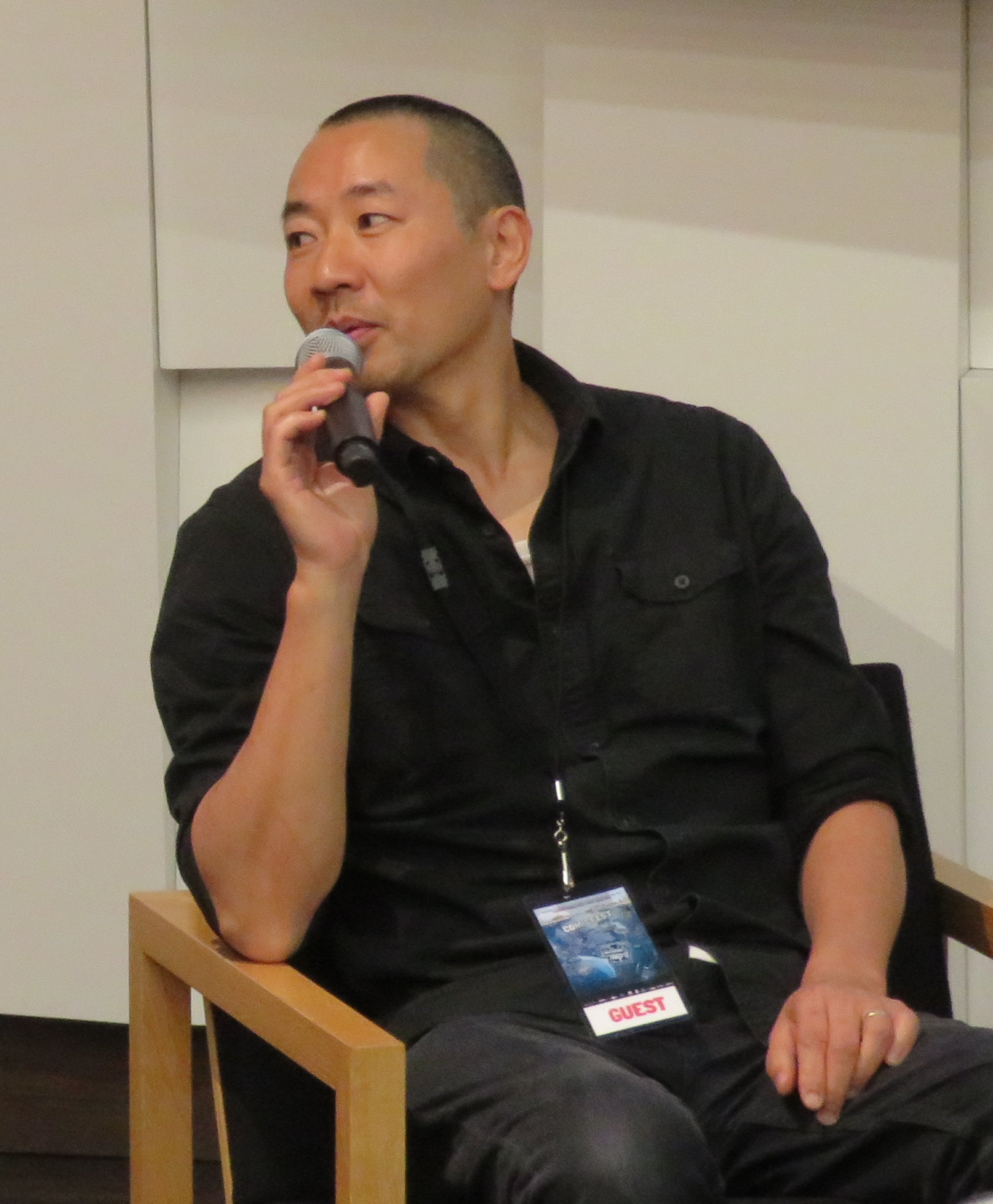
- Sang at Wellington ComicFest 2019
- Born: 1970 (age 55–56) New Zealand
- Areas: Cartoonist, Graphic Novelist
- Notable works: bro'Town,The Dharma Punks

Ant Sang (Chinese name: 方樹豪; 1970, New Zealand) is a fifth generation Chinese New Zealander comic book artist and designer. He is perhaps best known for his work on the animated show Bro'Town.

== Career ==
While studying graphic design at the then Auckland Institute of Technology in the mid-1990s, Sang first began to publish his work in the short-lived New Zealand comic Mainstream, and Auckland event guide The Fix. He also published his own mini-comic book, Filth, which ran to seven issues between 1994 and 1997. The central characters from Filth formed the basis of his next series, The Dharma Punks. This comprised an eight-issue story line, first published in the early 2000s and later compiled into a trade paperback with printing crowd-funded via Kickstarter in 2014.

Sang's graphic novel Shaolin Burning was nominated in 2012 for Best Picture Book in the New Zealand Post Children's Book Awards. This was the first time that a young adult graphic novel had been nominated in that category. He has also illustrated graphic novels for Victoria University's Youth Wellbeing Study and been published in magazines including Rip It Up and the New Zealand Listener.

Sang designed the characters and backgrounds for the award-winning animated show Bro'Town. He has also undertaken commercial work for organisations including SkyCity Cinemas.

== Selected works ==
=== Graphic novels ===
- Shaolin Burning
- The Dharma Punks
- Helen and the Go-Go Ninjas (with Michael Bennett)

=== Television ===
- bro'Town

== Awards ==
Sang has received the following awards and honors:

- Achievement in Production Design in General Television - Qantas Film and Television Awards 2008
- Achievement in Production Design - Air New Zealand Screen Awards 2006
