= Eruption (2010 film) =

2010 television programme

- Created by: Graeme Tetley
- Starring: Mark Mitchinson; Nicola Kawana; Anapela Polataivao; Billie Holland; Catherine Lee
- Country of origin: New Zealand

Production
- Producer: Dave Gibson
- Running time: 120 minutes

Original release
- Network: TV3
- Release: October 13, 2010

Eruption is a 2010 New Zealand docu-drama that follows days building up to a fictional Auckland volcanic eruption.

== Plot ==
Scientist Clive de Roo (played by Mark Mitchinson) detects volcanic activity under Waitematā Harbour. As de Roo presents as a maverick, he is not being taken seriously by his colleagues and his calls for having the city evacuated fall on deaf ears. Eruption follows the reaction of several families to the increasing seismic activity that precedes volcanic eruptions, including de Roo's own family. His wife, Mere (played by Nicola Kawana), is one of the people who disagree with his concerns. After a few days, the volcano starts erupting without any organised evacuation having taken place, with de Roo filming from his home. As the eruption intensifies, de Roo says "These will be my final observations" before his home gets pelted by rocks.

== Background ==
The 90-minute film was produced by Wellington production company Gibson Group and followed their award winning 2008 production Aftershock, which featured an earthquake that devastated and cut off the capital city. Both Aftershock and Eruption were by screenwriter Graeme Tetley, with the Auckland doco-drama one of his last works before his death in March 2011. Eruption was directed by Danny Mulheron and Dave Gibson was the producer. The movie's main character, scientist Clive de Roo, is played by Mitchinson. The leadup to the volcanic eruption is a realistic scenario informed by research undertaken by GNS Science and Civil Defence; Gibson estimated that Eruption is about 95 percent scientifically accurate. The film is based on the fact that the Auckland volcanic field is made up by dozens of volcanic cones, with the most recent eruption some 600 years ago forming Rangitoto Island.

Eruption aired on 13 October 2010 on TV3; this was timed to fall into the Civil Defence awareness week which went from 10 to 16 October 2010 and was dubbed "Get ready week". This was one month after the initial Christchurch earthquake where a New Zealand population experienced a natural disaster. Gibson hoped that it would not be "too much too soon" for people from Christchurch. The film was The New Zealand Herald's "TV pick of the week".
