= The Ugly (1997 film) =

- Australian daybill poster
- Directed by: Scott Reynolds
- Written by: Scott Reynolds
- Produced by: Jonathan Dowling
- Starring: Paolo Rotondo; Rebecca Hobbs; Jennifer Ward-Lealand; Roy Ward
- Cinematography: Simon Raby
- Edited by: Wayne Cook
- Music by: Victoria Kelly
- Release date: 26 August 1997 (Montreal World Film Festival)
- Running time: 93 minutes
- Country: New Zealand
- Language: English

The Ugly is a 1997 New Zealand psychological horror film written and directed by Scott Reynolds in his directorial debut, and starring Paolo Rotondo, Rebecca Hobbs, Jennifer Ward-Lealand, and Roy Ward. The film is about a psychiatrist who is meeting with a serial killer to determine whether or not he has been successfully cured. They delve into a journey through his past and his victims, and through this "The Ugly", a distorted allusion to "The Ugly Duckling" is revealed.

It was nominated for best film awards at festivals in New Zealand, Portugal and the United States. The film's success led to Miramax funding Reynold's next project Heaven, which was shot in New Zealand with a mix of local actors and American actors.

== Plot ==
Inside an old, decrepit insane asylum in Auckland, detained serial killer Simon Cartwright (Paolo Rotondo) seeks to be reevaluated by an outside psychiatrist to prove that he has been cured. He requests specifically for Dr. Karen Schumaker (Rebecca Hobbs). She has recently gained some notoriety for winning a case involving another serial killer. Simon endures abuse from two orderlies, Philip and Robert (Paul Glover and Christopher Graham), at the asylum. When Karen arrives, she argues with the head of the asylum, Dr. Marlowe (Roy Ward), who believes she is getting involved in Simon's case for publicity. As she is led to her first session with Simon, another patient named Marge (Darien Takle) warns Karen to watch out for "The Ugly."

Simon's backstory is explored through a series of flashbacks. As a youth, Simon was the target of abuse by his mother (Jennifer Ward-Lealand). She drove away the only person Simon had ever cared about, Julie (Vanessa Byrnes), and had prevented his wealthy father from taking custody and giving him a better life. In response to this, Simon murdered his mother and, after an attempt to cover up the crime, was locked in an asylum for five years. Upon his release Simon killed over a dozen random people, including Julie. However, Simon spared the life of a teenaged deaf girl, recognising that she was like him. Simon explains that it is "the ugly" that makes him kill; it will not leave him alone until he has satisfied its voice. Karen discovers that "The Ugly" is Simon's alternate persona, and that he has psychic powers.

At the end, Simon kills Philip and Robert, escapes the insane asylum, and kills Karen.

== Cast ==
- Paolo Rotondo as Simon Cartwright
  - Caelem Pope as Simon, aged 4
  - Sam Wallace as Simon, aged 13
- Rebecca Hobbs as Dr. Karen Shumaker
- Roy Ward as Dr. Marlowe
- Paul Glover as Philip
- Cristopher Graham as Robert
- Darien Takle as Marge
- Jennifer Ward-Lealand as Evelyn Cartwright
- Cath McWhirter as Helen Ann Miller
- Vanessa Byrnes as Julie
  - Beth Allen as Julie, aged 13

== Reception ==
The film received mixed reviews. On Rotten Tomatoes, the film has an approval rating of 40% based on 5 reviews, with a weighted average of 5.44/10.

IMDb has a rating of 6.0/10.0 with 57 reviews and 37 critic reviews.

== Special effects ==
Director Scott Reynolds made a stylistic decision to depict all blood shed in the movie as a dark, black colour. Author John Kenneth Muir writes in his book, Horror Films of the 1990s, about how this visual cue may suggest that Simon never saw his victims as being human, making it easier for him to kill.

== Awards ==
The film had 14 award nominations with 7 wins.

- At the 1999 Academy of Science Fiction, Fantasy and Horror Films (USA) awards the film was a nominee for the best home video release.
- Fangoria Chainsaw Awards (1999) they were a nominee for best limited-release/direct-to-video film, best actor (Paulo Rotondo) and best actress. (Rebecca Hobbs)
- At FantaFestival (1997) it won best actor. (Paulo Rotondo)
- Fantasporto (1998) it won 2 awards and had 1 nomination. Best actress (Rebecca Hobbs) and outstanding first feature. (Scott Reynolds) it had a nomination for best film.
- New Zealand Film and TV Awards (1997) it won 2 awards, best contribution to design (Richard Taylor) and best design. (Grand Major)
- Puchon International Fantastic Film Festival (1997) it won 1 award and had 1 nomination. Citizen of choice award and best of Puchon.
- Sitges - Catalonian International Film Festival (1997) it won 1 award and had 1 nomination. Best director and best film.
