= Game of Bros =

New Zealand dating game show

- Genre: Game show reality television
- Written by: Olly Coddington
- Directed by: Mario Gaoa
- Presented by: Anapela Polataivo; Goretti Chadwick; Wairangi Koopu
- Country of origin: New Zealand
- No. of seasons: 3
- No. of episodes: 21

Production
- Executive producer: Lisa Taquma
- Camera setup: Multi-camera
- Production company: Tikilounge Productions Te Mangai Paoho

Original release
- Network: Māori Television
- Release: 17 March 2016 – 14 June 2018

Game of Bros is a New Zealand reality television / game show that aired on Māori Television and which premiered on 17 March 2016. In a format compared to The Bachelor New Zealand, several Pacific Island men compete for the attention of two women comedians, Anapela Polataivao and Goretti Chadwick.

== Cast ==
Season 1

Hosts: Anapela Polataivao and Goretti Chadwick.

Winner: Louis Ova

Contestants:

- Louis Ova
- Joe Mc'Cormack
- Jordan Cruickshank
- Paul J Ah Kuoi
- Zephaniah Sao-Mafiti
- Thierry Martel
- Michael Koloi
- Elia Antonio
- Yanique Michaels
- Ramon Betham
- James Russell
- Selwyn Te Pania

Season 2

Hosts: Anapela Polataivao and Goretti Chadwick.

Game master: Wairangi Koopu

Contestants:

- Josh Tupou
- Roranin Arakua
- Jasom Sawyer
- Carlos Ulberg
- Joash Fahitua
- Oscar Kettle
- Ammon Johnson
- Rakena Takarei
- Phoenix Puleanga
- Jesse Elliot

Season 3

The third season included both male and female celebrity contestants, vying to win $10,000 for a charity of their choice.

Host/game master: Wairangi Koopu

Contestants:

- Miriama Smith, actress
- Jimi Jackson, comedian
- Kihi Ririnui, TV presenter
- Carlos Ulberg, pro fighter (who also competed in season 2)
- Makere Gibbons, tennis
- Gloria Blake, model
- Shimpal Lelisi, actor
- Dave Letele, boxer
- Kai Kara-France, MMA fighter

== Production ==
The show was announced on 2016.

The show premiered on 17 March 2016.

In 2016 the show was renewed for a second season.

The second season premiered on 22 March 2017.

Season 3 premiered on May 3, 2018.
