= Goretti Chadwick =

Samoan-New Zealand stage and television actress, writer, director and tutor

- Occupations: Actress, writer, director
- Known for: Pani and Pani
- Notable work: Sione's Wedding

Goretti Chadwick is a Samoan-New Zealand stage and television actress, writer, director and tutor.

Chadwick completed a Diploma in Stage and Screen Acting at Unitec Institute of Technology in Auckland, New Zealand. She has worked in theatre and television as an actor, writer and director. Her work in theatre includes Hymn, The Rocky Horror Picture Show, Island Girls and Jingle Bells. Her film credits include The Legend of Johnny Lingo, The Overstayer and Sione's Wedding. In 2010 she partnered with Anapela Polataivao to create the comedic duo Pani and Pani, and the pair went on to create and host the television show Game of Bros.

Chadwick is a tutor in acting and directing at Pacific Institute of Performing Arts (PIPA) in Auckland, New Zealand.

== Stage appearances ==
- Frangipani Perfume, written by Makerita Urale, Auckland, 2005
- Doubt, written by John Patrick Shanley, Auckland, 2006
- My name is Gary Cooper, written by Victor Rodger, Auckland, 2007
- Jingle Bells, written by Dianna Fuemana, Auckland, 2010
- Still Life With Chickens, written by D.F. Mamea, Auckland and national tour, 2017

== Directing credits ==
- Sinarella, Auckland, 2012
- Where We Once Belonged, co-directed with Anapela Polataivao, Auckland, 2012

== Film appearances ==
- The Overstayer, 1999
- The Legend of Johnny Lingo, 2003
- Sione's Wedding, 2006
- Apron Strings, 2008
- Vermilion, 2018

== Television credits ==
- Tala Pasifika, 1995
- The Market, 2005
- Orange Roughies, 2006-2007
- A Thousand Apologies, 2008
- Fresh TV, 2011 - ongoing
- Game of Bros, 2016 - ongoing
