= Chris Auty =

British film executive, journalist and producer (born 1957)

- Born: 1957 (age 68–69)
- Education: King's College, University of Cambridge
- Occupations: Film executive, journalist and producer
- Employer: London Film School

Chris Auty (born 1957) is a British film executive, journalist and producer. Outlets for his early journalism included Time Out, Sight and Sound, and The Hollywood Reporter, and his producing/executive producing credits include Stealing Beauty, Blood and Wine, Crash, My Summer of Love, In This World, Bright Young Things and The Proposition. Among noted directors with whom Auty has worked are Bernardo Bertolucci, Michael Winterbottom, Pawel Pawlikowski and David Cronenberg, and he is a former board member of the UK Film Council and the European Film Academy.

From 2012, Auty served as Head of Producing at the National Film and Television School (NFTS), where he started the Creative Business for Entrepreneurs and Executives (CBEE) MA course that aims to equip students with the skills to start their own creative businesses of the future. In September 2023, it was announced that Auty would be taking up a new appointment as director of the London Film School, starting in November 2023.

== Career ==
Auty attended King's College, Cambridge, before beginning his career as a film journalist with Time Out magazine, for which he wrote reviews and ran the film department from 1979 to 1981. From 1984 to 1985, he served as European Editor of The Hollywood Reporter. After leaving journalism in 1985, he launched the UK film distribution company Oasis, which in the following five years released some 45 films, and also acquired cinemas – the Gate Cinema in London and The Cameo in Edinburgh – and extended the business into international sales and film finance.

Between 1991 and 1999, he was the managing director of the Recorded Picture Company, a production company owned by Jeremy Thomas, working alongside Thomas as a producer on several films (among them Bernardo Bertolucci's Little Buddha and Stealing Beauty, David Cronenberg's Crash and Bob Rafelson's Blood and Wine) and initiating the setting up of film sales company HanWay Films.

In 1999, Auty became a founding board member of the UK Film Council. From mid-1999, he was chief executive officer of the Film Consortium and, in October 2001, he also became chief executive of the Works Media Group (which incorporated the Film Consortium), until 2007. Films he produced during this period include River Queen, directed by Vincent Ward, which earned Auty a "Best Picture" nomination at the 2006 Air New Zealand Screen Awards.

In 2012, he joined the National Film and Television School (NFTS) based in Beaconsfield, as Head of Producing. Over the next decade, he produced and supervised the development and production of up to 30 short films a year, in addition to running the NFTS's two-year MA producing programme, as well as being responsible for designing, validating and running new MA courses. He developed and led the Creative Business for Entrepreneurs and Executives (CBEE) MA course, which includes teaching by key figures from the creative industries, spanning publishing, theatre, games, music or digital entertainment, in addition to film and television. As described by Richard Branson, "This course gives young entrepreneurs in the creative industries the compass to navigate their way across those domains, with practical knowledge and practical guidance."

Over the years, Auty has been a judge or associate of such industry events as the British Independent Film Awards (BIFA), the BFI Future Film Festival, the DepicT Short Film Competition (part of Encounters Film Festival), and other initiatives.

In September 2023, it was reported that Auty had been appointed director of the London Film School (LFS), as of November, with LFS chairman Greg Dyke stating: "We are delighted to have attracted a candidate of Chris Auty's calibre." On the announcement, Auty said: "I'm delighted to be taking on the leadership of this renowned film school in the heart of London. It happens to be the place where my own journey into film began – working with LFS alumnus Miguel Pereira on his first feature film."

As director and chief executive officer of the LFS, Auty is "bringing the UK's oldest film school into a new era", noted Screen Daily in 2025, with initiatives that include "an upgraded campus, additional courses and a fresh focus on engaging with the UK industry."

== Selected filmography ==
- 1994: Little Buddha (for Recorded Picture Company – Production)
- 1996: Stealing Beauty (Associate Producer)
- 1996: Crash (Co-executive Producer)
- 1996: The Ogre (Associate Producer)
- 1997: Blood and Wine (Executive Producer)
- 1998: Victory (Associate Producer)
- 1999: All the Little Animals (Executive Producer)
- 2001: Dust (Producer)
- 2003: Bright Young Things (Executive Producer)
- 2003: The Republic of Love (Executive Producer)
- 2003: In This World (Executive Producer)
- 2004: My Summer of Love (Executive Producer)
- 2005: Clean (The Film Consortium – Production Executive)
- 2005: Guy X (Executive Producer)
- 2005: The Best Man (Executive Producer)
- 2005: Deadlines (Executive Producer)
- 2005: River Queen (Producer)
- 2006: The Proposition (Executive Producer)
- 2006: Country of My Skull (Executive Producer)
- 2007: I Really Hate My Job (Executive Producer)
