= The Monster's Christmas =

- Genre: Family; Fantasy
- Written by: Burton Silver
- Directed by: Yvonne Mackay
- Starring: Paul Farrell; Leona Hatherly; Paul Jenden
- Theme music composer: Dave Fraser
- Country of origin: New Zealand
- Original language: English
- No. of episodes: 1

Production
- Producer: Dave Gibson
- Cinematography: Peter James
- Editor: Simon Reece
- Running time: 48 minutes
- Production company: New Zealand National Film Unit

Original release
- Network: TVNZ
- Release: 25 December 1981

The Monster's Christmas is a 1981 New Zealand Christmas fantasy television film produced by Television New Zealand.

The movie tells the tale of a young girl who is approached by a monster from one of her storybooks to help him and other monsters regain their voices that have been stolen by a wicked witch. According to distributor Gibson Group, it was "deliberately written and planned as a location film, it incorporates many of New Zealand’s beautiful scenic spots". A region 1 DVD was released in 2004. On 23 December 2022, Rifftrax released a commentary on the film.

== Cast ==
- Lucy McGrath as the little girl
- Leone Hatherly as the witch
- Paul Farrell as the mountain monster
- Michael Wilson as Nasty, the bat-mole creature
- Ingrid Prossor
- Roger Page as the mud monster

Bernard Kearns and Jeremy Stevens provided monster voices.

== Production ==
The film was directed by Yvonne Mackay and written by Burton Silver. It was produced by David Gibson and Gibson Film Productions. The show's star, Lucy McGrath, was around nine years old when the film was released. She previously had taken drama lessons at Wellington High School and had starred in the Gibson film Black Hearted Barney Blackfoot in 1980. 150 people auditioned for the Monster's Christmas role and McGrath was chosen. Filming took place in caves and featured McGrath climbing a rope ladder near a waterfall. On some days, filming lasted between 7:00 am and 9:00 pm. The film, which has a running time of 48 minutes, was released on 25 December 1981.

== Reception ==
The film critic Donald C. Willis gave The Monster's Christmas a mixed review, writing, "Nonsense-for-children is a tad slow, but generally agreeable Sesame Street stuff. One monster looks like an artichoke, or leftovers from Battle Beyond the Sun." He praised Lucy McGrath for "an effortlessly expressive face and voice" and for "seem[ing] right at home with the weird creatures". The International Film Guide praised it for being a "bizarrely-entertaining" film. The Monster's Christmas received a bronze medal at the New York film and television festival in 1981.

== See also ==
- List of Christmas films
