= Mark Crysell =

New Zealand television presenter and journalist (born 1961)

- Born: February 21, 1961 (age 65)
- Occupations: Television presenter and journalist
- Years active: 1990–Present
- Spouse: Briar McCormack

Mark Crysell (born 21 February 1961) is a New Zealand television presenter and journalist. He has worked on different shows with Television New Zealand.

== Career ==
=== Television ===
Mark Crysell is a television reporter who has been part of the team for Television New Zealand's flagship current affairs programme, Sunday since 2003.

Crysell has also reported for TVNZ shows, Assignment, Close Up, One News, Fair Go and the arts programme Backch@t.

In early 2018, Crysell went to North Korea with a Sunday team which negotiated access to parts of the country that no foreigner had ever been to.

Between 2008 and 2010, he was TVNZ's Europe Correspondent based in London which included covering everything from All Blacks tours, to the GFC and a Gaza war.

Along the way he collected many awards, including Best Current Affairs Reporter and Television Reporter of the Year at the Qantas Media Awards, best daily current affairs report in the AFTA Awards in 2011 and best weekly current affairs report at the NZ TV awards in 2012. He's also won two TP McLean awards for Best Sports Features. In 2021 he won Broadcast Reporter of The Year at the Voyager Media Awards.

Crysell started his career in radio working first for Radio Northland in Whangarei in 1990 and then for National Radio in Christchurch and Wellington. He was seconded to Radio Deutsche Welle in Cologne, Germany between 1992 and 1994 where he also worked as Radio New Zealand's Europe Correspondent.

Crysell has also been a fencing contractor in Taranaki, a truck and bulldozer driver, prospected for gas and oil in the Western Australian desert, a roofer in Bavaria and a courier driver in London.

== Personal life ==
Crysell is married to current affairs producer Briar McCormack.
