= Lovebites (TV series) =

- Created by: Andrew Brettell; Stephen Hickey; Sean Molloy
- Based on: Hopeless
- Written by: Andrew Brettell; Stephen Hickey; Sean Molloy; Vanessa Alexander; Chris Gilman; Brian Johnson; David Brechin-Smith; Simon Shuker
- Directed by: Simon Raby; Murray Keane; Roz Mason; Robert Sarkies
- Country of origin: New Zealand
- Original language: English
- No. of seasons: 1
- No. of episodes: 26

Production
- Producers: Ainsley Gardiner; Larry Parr
- Running time: 23 minutes

Original release
- Release: March 21, 2002 – 2002

Lovebites is a 2002 New Zealand comedy television series spun off from the 2000 film Hopeless. It features Scott Wills, Phil Pinner, Adam Gardiner and Mia Taumoepeau reprising their roles from the film and adds Gentiane Lupi to the core cast. It was filmed in 2001 with a budget of $4 million and aired on TV3 beginning 10pm on Thursdays in March 2002. It follows the lives of five flatmates in their twenties living in Wellington. 26 episodes were produced but it was taken off air after 12 episodes.

Frances Grant of the New Zealand Herald said after the first three episodes "When the show's being true to the sometimes awkward, sometimes insecurely egotistical strain of our national character, it's very funny. When it attempts the kind of wacky, motor-mouthed repartee of an American sitcom it sounds forced."

== Cast ==
- Phil Pinner as Ben Gilmour
- Mia Taumoepeau as Maryann Moore
- Scott Wills as Phil Hope
- Adam Gardiner as Richard
- Gentiane Lupi as Clare Grainger
- Anthony Johnston as Iain
