= Hopeless (2000 film) =

- Directed by: Stephen Hickey
- Written by: Stephen Hickey; Sean Molloy
- Produced by: Larry Parr
- Cinematography: Simon Riera
- Edited by: Jonno Woodford-Robinson; Andrew Brettell
- Music by: Sam Negri; Jeremy Geor
- Release date: 19 April 2000
- Running time: 82 minutes
- Country: New Zealand
- Language: English
- Budget: $300,000

Hopeless is a 2000 New Zealand comedy film written by Stephen Hickey and Sean Molloy and directed by Hickey. It was spun of into a tv series, Lovebites. Hopeless opened in New Zealand cinemas in April. before playing at the Cannes Festival in May.

== Cast ==
- Phil Pinner as Ben
- Mia Taumoepeau as Maryann
- Scott Wills as Phil
- Adam Gardiner as Richard
- Lydia Harris as Trish
- Erica Lowe as Wendy
- Sally Stockwell as Aleo
- Anthony Johnston as Iain

== Reception ==
The New Zealand Herald's Russell Baillie gave it 2 stars and said "It's not a particularly memorable movie, perhaps, but an impressive demo tape certainly." Dylan Cleaver of Sunday Star Times gave it 3 stars and says that it " sends a message of hope to all aspiring New Zealand filmmakers: a quality production is possible with a small budget – if you've got a good script." He writes "What results is an often very funny, if at times hammy, look at young lives and loves in Wellington."

David Stratton in Variety said "Though it covers familiar territory — the romantic entanglements of a bunch of likable urban twentysome-things — there’s a freshness and sense of fun to be found in this no-budget Kiwi comedy, plus a fine ensemble of talented young thesps headed by Hugh Grant clone Phil Pinner." Laura Hall's capsual review in Sunday News gave it 2 stars saying "With sharper, funnier writing – and more disciplined acting – Hopeless could have delivered on its Swinger pretension instead of being a half-baked wannabe."
