= Peter James (cinematographer) =

Australian cinematographer (born 1947)

- Born: 7 March 1947 (age 79); Sydney, New South Wales, Australia
- Occupation: Cinematographer
- Years active: 1971–2018

Peter James (born 7 March 1947) is an Australian cinematographer.

He is a member of the American Society of Cinematographers (ASC), an organization that offers membership to directors of photography only "by invitation, based on an individual’s body of work".

== Career ==
James has been either cinematographer or director of photography on more than 50 films.

He has won Australian Cinematographers Society's (ACS) Milli Award four times, Australian Film Institute's Award for Best Achievement in Cinematography three times and was nominated for the award for Outstanding Cinematography for a Miniseries or Movie at the 56th Primetime Emmy Awards for his work on the 2003 television film And Starring Pancho Villa as Himself.

In 1999, James was inducted into the Australian Cinematographers Society Hall of Fame for having "made a substantial contribution to the industry and the Society, as well as having left a legacy of fine work and having been responsible for training and influencing others."

== Filmography ==
=== Feature film ===
Year	Title	Director
1973	Avengers of the Reef	Chris McCullough
1976	Caddie	Donald Crombie
1978	The Irishman	Donald Crombie
1981	The Killing of Angel Street	Donald Crombie
1984	The Wild Duck	Henri Safran
1985	Rebel	Michael Jenkins
1987	The Right Hand Man	Di Drew
1987	Echoes of Paradise	Phillip Noyce
1989	Driving Miss Daisy	Bruce Beresford
1990	Mister Johnson	Bruce Beresford
1991	Black Robe	Bruce Beresford
1992	Rich in Love	Bruce Beresford
1993	Alive	Frank Marshall
1993	The Thing Called Love	Peter Bogdanovich
1993	My Life	Bruce Joel Rubin
1994	Silent Fall	Bruce Beresford
1996	Diabolique	Jeremiah S. Chechik
1996	Last Dance	Bruce Beresford
1997	Paradise Road	Bruce Beresford
1998	The Newton Boys	Richard Linklater
1999	Double Jeopardy	Bruce Beresford
2000	Meet the Parents	Jay Roach
2001	Bride of the Wind	Bruce Beresford
2001	The Man Who Sued God	Mark Joffe
2005	The Pacifier	Adam Shankman
2005	Cheaper by the Dozen 2	Adam Shankman
2008	27 Dresses	Anne Fletcher
2009	Mao's Last Dancer	Bruce Beresford
2010	Yogi Bear	Eric Brevig
2018	Ladies in Black	Bruce Beresford

=== TV movies ===
Year	Title	Director
1976	McManus MPB	Max Varnel
1981	The Monster's Christmas	Yvonne Mackay
2003	And Starring Pancho Villa as Himself	Bruce Beresford
2006	Orpheus	Bruce Beresford

Documentary film

Year	Title	Director
1974	Who Killed Jenny Langby?	Donald Crombie
