= Gary Hannam =

Gary Hannam (born 1951 in Whangārei) is a New Zealand film producer. He co-produced The World's Fastest Indian among other films. He has also played a role in the Olivado Limited avocado oil company and served as its chief executive officer.
