= London Film School =

Film school in England

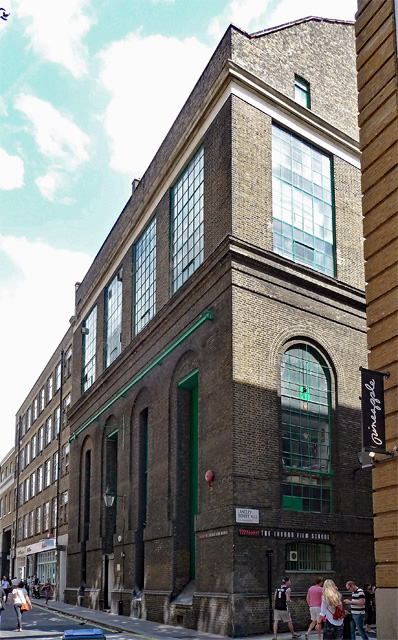
- Former names: London School of Film Technique (1956–1969); London Film School (1969–1974); London International Film School (1974–2000)
- Type: Educational Charity
- Established: 1956; 70 years ago
- Affiliations: CILECT, ScreenSkills, NAHEMI, GEECT
- Chairman: Greg Dyke
- Director: Chris Auty
- Postgraduates: 360
- Location: London, United Kingdom; 51.5135°N 0.1255°W
- Website: lfs.org.uk

London Film School (LFS) is a film school in London, United Kingdom, and is situated in Covent Garden, neighbouring Soho, a hub of the British film industry. It is the oldest film school in the UK.

LFS was founded in 1956 by Gilmore Roberts as the London School of Film Technique (LSFT). Originally based on Electric Avenue in Brixton, the school moved to a converted brewery on Shelton Street in 1966, after a brief parenthesis in Charlotte Street, and changed its name to London Film School in 1969. From 1974 to 2000, it was known as the London International Film School (LIFS), and reverted to the name London Film School in 2001. In 2025, it expanded with a new campus in nearby Parker Street, now become its main hub.

LFS offers four degrees at postgraduate level: in partnership with University of Warwick an MA in Filmmaking, an MA in Screenwriting, an MA in Film Producing, an MA in Film Marketing, and, in partnership with the University of Exeter, MA in International Film Business. It also offers a range of short and part-time professional development courses under the London Filmworks banner.

LFS recruits students from all over the world and is specifically constituted as an international community; around 80 per cent of its students are from outside the United Kingdom. LFS is recognised as a World-Leading Specialist Provider by the Office for Students and in recent years it has been named one of the top international film schools by Variety and The Hollywood Reporter.

The school's current director is Chris Auty and chairman is Greg Dyke.

== History ==
The origin of the LFS was a short film training course taught by Gilmore Roberts at the Heatherley School of Fine Art in Chelsea. After a dispute with the art school, Roberts decided to continue the course independently, so he set up the London School of Film Technique in October 1956. After struggling to find suitable premises, the first filmmaking course finally started in April 1957, based in a rather modest locale above a grocer's shop in Electric Avenue, Brixton.

The school was the first of its kind in the United Kingdom. Inspired by the emergence of film schools in Eastern Europe after World War II, it was set up around the belief that the future of the British film industry required properly designed formal training, rather than the apprenticeship basis which was, at the time, the only access into the field. At first, the school offered a six-month diploma course, which students could take over the day or evening classes, with an optional six-month extension. Under the leadership of a new principal, Robert Dunbar, the course was expanded to 33 weeks and later two years, forming the basic structure for a curriculum that is still largely in place today.

This caused a drastic increase in the student numbers, which made the original premises unsuited. The school moved to the West End in 1963, first into a building in Charlotte Street and later, in 1966, in its current premises on Shelton Street. In 1969 it changed name to London Film School, to avoid being regarded as an institution that only offered narrow technical training. Notable alumni from the 1960s include directors such as Mike Leigh, Michael Mann, Don Boyd, and Les Blair, cinematographers such as Tak Fujimoto and Roger Pratt, as well as producers like Iain Smith.

In the early 1970s, a decrease of student numbers caused by various factors, including the establishment of the National Film School and the global impact of the oil crisis, brought the school into a financial crisis and eventually into liquidation. Staff and students banded together to press for continuation of the school; thanks to their efforts in raising the necessary funds, the school reopened in 1975, at the same location, under a new name: the London International Film School.

The school was newly incorporated as a charity, nonprofit-making company limited by guarantee. All students automatically became members of the company upon enrolment, with the right to elect, together with the other members, a board of governors who have the overall responsibility for the management of the school. Manny Wynn was appointed principal of the re-established LIFS until his sudden death six months later, when he was succeeded by John Fletcher.

Notable filmmakers from all over the world studied at the LIFS in the 1970s and 1980s, including Mexican director Luis Mandoki, Hong Kong director Ann Hui, Swiss cinematographer Ueli Steiger and Argentinian director Miguel Pereira. After John Fletcher's death, Martin Amstel was appointed principal in 1986. Ten years later, in 1996, the 40th anniversary of the school was celebrated with events and screening of graduates’ work in London, Los Angeles and Mexico City.

After the appointment of Ben Gibson as principal in 2000, the school returned to be known as London Film School. Under Ben Gibson, LFS transitioned from offering a diploma course to offering postgraduate MA programmes, first validated by the London Metropolitan University and later by University of Warwick. Nevertheless, the curriculum of the filmmaking course remained very similar and maintained its focus on practical filmmaking. Adjustments where brought in place to reflect the technological developments in the film industry and the transition to digital. The school also started diversifying its courses: next to its traditional course in filmmaking, it started offering an MA course in screenwriting in 2005 and, from 2014, an MA in International Film Business in partnership with the University of Exeter.

Ben Gibson was succeeded as the director of the school by Jane Roscoe from 2014 to 2017. Gísli Snær, Head of Studies at LFS since 2016, was appointed as the new director in 2018; Snær presided over the school during the difficult years of the COVID-19 pandemic, until stepping down in June 2022. After six months under interim director Peter Holliday, Neil Peplow was appointed as the new director in January 2023. Nevertheless, Peplow stepped down after only ten months in the post, after being offered a senior international role in the film industry; Chris Auty, previously head of producing at the National Film and Television School, took over as the new director in November 2023.

Under Chris Auty, LFS expanded into new facilities in nearby Parker Street, which have become its main hub, while continuing to operate from its historic building in Shelton Street, now hosting the school's short course and workshop strand. Additionally, LFS further expanded its course offerings, launching two new one-year MA programmes, one in film producing and one in film marketing, with their first intake starting in September 2025.

In recent years, films made at the school have regularly featured and won awards in some of the world's top film festivals, including Venice, Cannes, Berlin, the BFI London Film Festival, Encounters and Sundance. Recent alumni include Benjamin Cleary, Anu Menon, and Carla Simón.

== Facilities ==
The new main London Film School building in Parker Street offers a modern setting and facilities and is adjoined by an independent cinema, The Garden Cinema. Additional facilities are located in the School's historic building in Shelton Street, which was previously a brewery and a banana warehouse.

Across both buildings, LFS offers four shooting stages equipped with lighting grids, as well as a rehearsal studio used also for workshops. LFS occasionally hires external studios facilities as well.

The school has a fully equipped design studio with drawing boards, model making facilities, visual reference library, materials library and design computer suite. It has editing suites equipped with Avid Media Composer as well as sound suites equipped with Pro Tools 24HD, a commentary and Foley recording area and a sound effects library.

LFS also has two cinemas (Cinema A & B), with 110- and 35-seat capacity respectively and projection facilities for both digital and 16mm.

== Courses of studies ==
London Film School is built around a conservatoire model. Filmmaking is taught on stages and in workshops rather than in classrooms, and the courses are structured around practical work. The school has a full-time faculty and a varied group of regular visiting lecturers.

The MA Filmmaking programme has no pre-specialisation. Over the two-year course, all students are provided with a full education in all the craft areas of filmmaking: directing, producing, editing, cinematography, sound, production design, and writing. Students work on at least one film every term, in different roles, and have the chance to crew on films made by students from other terms. Exercises include films shot in 16mm on location with no sound or only post-recorded sound and films shot on 35mm or digital in studio, on purposely designed and built sets. One term is dedicated to making a documentary. For their graduation films, students do not have limitations and are allowed to shoot on any format and at any length they can budget and schedule. Often, students make their graduation film in their home country, which means that LFS films have been made all over the world. All film exercises are provided with a production allowance included in the fees. With around 200 full-time students at any one time on the programme, it generates over 180 films a year.

The one-year MA Screenwriting programme is centred on the development of a full-length feature script, with individual monitoring and guidance from industry mentors. Workshops on storytelling and film language, characterisation, scene writing, and more are based around practical writing exercises. Screenwriting students have the chance to collaborate with students on the filmmaking programme and experience the production side of filmmaking first hand.

The MA International Film Business programme, run in conjunction with the University of Exeter, prepares students for careers in programming, exhibition and distribution. Over the one-year course, students participate in modules in international finance, world cinema and a trip to a major international film festival.

MA Film Producing is a one year course taught over five modules, and addresses all the core competences required of a professional film producer in an industry which operates globally. Aspiring film producers are immersed in the LFS creative hothouse of student directors, screenwriters, and cinematographers from over 50 nations. The School is housed in two film studio buildings in Covent Garden, which contain shooting stages, full post-production facilities, and extensive camera and location kit. Script development, project management, budgeting and delivery and business skills are the key skills taught on this explicitly industry-facing MA programme.

The one-year MA Film Marketing programme introduces students to all aspects of B2B and B2C marketing strategies for the film industry - from key art design and promotional trailers to media, publicity and social media plans. Across five modules of study, the MA Film Marketing explores the planning and execution of effective marketing campaigns for film distribution, cinema promotion, and digital release on VoD.

The MA Filmmaking, MA Screenwriting, MA Film Producing and MA Film Marketing programmes are validated by the University of Warwick. MA International Film Business is offered jointly with University of Exeter, with site study split between Exeter and London. Next to the full-time MA courses, London Film School offers a variety of short-term workshops and professional development courses.

== Governance and staff ==
=== Director ===
- Chris Auty

=== Governing body ===
- Chair: Greg Dyke
- Vice-Chair: Amanda Nevill CBE
- Governors:
  - Olivier Kaempfer
  - Nick Humby
  - Joan Watson
  - Suzy Black
  - William Macpherson
  - Anne Sheehan
  - Jane Lush
  - Neil Blair
  - Sophia Wellington, LFS Staff Governor
  - Tony Chuka, LFS Student Governor

=== Key academic staff ===
- Candida Moriarty – Head of Production Design
- Arttu Salmi – Head of Editing
- Tabitha Jenkins - MA Filmmaking Year One Lead
- Sophia Wellington – Head of Screenwriting and MA Screenwriting Course Leader
- Lia Devlin - MA Film Marketing Course Leader
- Sarah Sulick - MA Film Producing Course Leader
- Victoria Thomas – MA International Film Business Course Leader
- Charis Coke – MA Filmmaking Course Leader
- Rafael Kapelinski – MA Filmmaking Head of Directing
- Jonas Grimås – Module Leader
- Lucy Kaye – Module Leader
- Giles Borg – Module Leader
- Sue Austen – MA Filmmaking Year Two Lead
- Rob Szeliga - Head of Sound
- Dom Kersey - Head of Cinematography
- Richard Kwietniowski – Module Leader

== Notable alumni ==
- Gavin MacFadyen
- John Irvin
- Ian Wilson BSC
- Ross Devenish
- Bill Douglas
- Tak Fujimoto ASC
- Boaz Davidson
- Mark Forstater
- Harley Cokeliss
- Mohamed Khan
- Mike Leigh
- Les Blair
- Michael Mann
- Franc Roddam
- Eduardo Guedes
- George P. Cosmatos
- Jins Shamsuddin
- Don Boyd
- Roger Pratt BSC
- Nii Kwate Owoo
- Iain Smith
- Gale Tattersall
- Iain Sinclair
- Horace Ove
- Manousos Manousakis
- Mark Goldblatt
- Alessandro Di Robilant
- Tunde Kelani
- Luis Mandoki
- Menelik Shabazz
- Miguel Pereira
- Dominique Othenin-Girard
- Alessandro Jacchia
- Ueli Steiger ASC
- Yorgos Mavropsaridis
- Ann Hui
- Robert Leighton
- Louis Mouchet
- Danny Huston
- Shimako Sato
- Brad Anderson
- Affonso Gonçalves
- Kamran Qureshi
- John Walsh
- Elliot Hegarty
- Newton Aduaka
- Duncan Jones
- Ishaya Bako
- Babak Jalali
- Ginevra Elkann
- Oliver Hermanus
- James Friend BSC ASC
- Camilla Stroem Henriksen
- Anu Menon
- Anjali Menon
- Ali F. Mostafa
- Charlotte Colbert
- Simón Mesa Soto
- Benjamin Cleary
- Carla Simón

== Honorary Associates ==
Every year, at London Film School's Annual Showcase, the school awards an Honorary Associateship to commended leading screen industry figures. Previous recipients of this award are:

- Gillian Anderson
- Amma Asante
- Jim Broadbent
- Mike Figgis
- Stephen Frears
- Abbas Kiarostami
- Ken Loach
- Pawel Pawlikowski
- Lynne Ramsay
- Jeremy Thomas
- Richard Linklater
- Philip Davis
- Ralph Fiennes
- Philip French
- William Friedkin
- Jack Gold
- Christine Langan
- Richard Lester
- Samantha Morton
- Tessa Ross
- Rita Tushingham
- Walter Murch
- Asif Kapadia
- Les Blair
- Gurinder Chadha
- Alan Parker
- Kasi Lemmons
- Marianne Jean-Baptiste
- Clint Dyer
- Sarah Niles
- Mick Audsley
