= Vanessa Byrnes =

New Zealand director, actress, teacher and academic

Vanessa Byrnes is a director, actress and educator in New Zealand. She has collaborated on many theatre and screen productions including feature films, short films, television commercials and theatre. As an educator she completed a PhD at the University of Waikato in 2015, titled Removing the ‘Cloak of Invisibility’: New Zealand Directors Discuss Theatre Directing Praxis. Byrnes has been in senior roles at both Toi Whakaari and Unitec Institute of Technology, leading drama training for many years. She is an experienced theatre director and as an actor was in popular television soap opera Shortland Street.

For 11 years Byrnes held the acting department manager job at Toi Whakaari: NZ Drama School and she is a graduate of the school from 1994. Previous to that she graduated from Waikato University with a Masters in 1992. Byrnes has a PhD from Waikato University (2015) looking at 'the praxis of selected New Zealand text-based theatre directors'. Byrnes is the Head of School, Creative Industries at Unitec Institute of Technology, Auckland.

Shakespeare productions has been part of Byrnes' repertoire and in 2000 she was the first New Zealander to be an assistant director at Shakespeare’s Globe Theatre in London. This was on The Two Noble Kinsmen with Tim Carroll. In 2016 Byrnes adapted and directed Shakespeare's Antony and Cleopatra in New Zealand. A review on Theatre Scenes said it 'manages to balance the play’s plot turns with a sense of wit and imagination'. It was presented at the Pop-Up Globe in Bard's Yard, Auckland.

As an actor Byrnes appeared in New Zealand's long running soap opera Shortland Street. She has numerous TV and film credits to her name including Mirror Mirror, The Strip and Step Dave. She directed Tarnished Frocks and Divas in 2011 in the Bay of Plenty.

As well as her academic writing, Byrnes often writes reviews for theatre productions.

== Directing credits ==
Date	Title	Author	Venue & producer	Cast & Crew	Ref
2000	Box/Role/Dream	Lynda Chanwai Earle	BATS Theatre	Cast: Karl Kite Rangi, Kirstie O'Sullivan, Tanea Heke, Nick Brown, Set design, Andrew Lock, Lighting design, Jennifer Lal	
2001	Between	Helen Varley Jamieson (Playwright)	Young and Hungry, BATS Theatre	Rose Bollinger, Simon Vincent, Kirsty KIng-Turner, Leo Prince, Kate Prior. Music: James Goldsmith	
2002	Abigail's Party	Mike Leigh (Playwright)	BATS Theatre	Cast: Jane Donald, Lauren Jackson, Biddy O'Connell, Peter Rutherford, Aaron Alexander	
2006	Please Don't Feed the Models	Sara Standring co-devised with Vanessa Byrnes	BATS Theatre	Sara Standring	

== Board membership ==
- Downstage Theatre
- PlayMarket
- Shakespeare Globe Centre (NZ)
- TAPAC: The Auckland Performing Arts Centre
