= Mia Blake =

New Zealand actress

- Occupation: Actress

Mia Blake (née Mia Taumoepeau) is a New Zealand based actress. She won the 2006 New Zealand Screen Award for Best Performance by Actress in a Supporting Role for her role in No. 2.

== Career ==
In 2000, Blake secured a role in film Hopeless as Maryann Moore. Taumoepeau then starred in the sci-fi drama series The Tribe in which she portrayed the character of Ginny. She later reprised the role of Maryann in a television series spin-off titled Lovebites.

2006 saw her playing Charlene in No. 2 and in 2007 she featured in The Tattooist playing a beautiful Samoan girl, Sina.

== Personal life ==
Blake was born in Tonga to Togan and Scottish parents.

== Filmography ==
Film

Year	Title	Role	Notes
2000	Hopeless	Maryann	Lead
2002	Fracture	Denise	Support
2003	Without a Paddle	Giselle	Support
2005	Stringer	Interrogator	Support
2005	No. 2	Charlene	Lead
2006	The Tattooist	Sina	Support
2006	Cinema Parodies	Eva	Short
2007	This is Her	Evie	Short
2009	Hopes and Dreams of Gazza Snell	Nurse	Support
2009	Isosceles	Julie	Short
2015	6 Days	Betty	
2018	Stray	Michelle	Support

Television

Year	Title	Role	Notes
2002	The Tribe	Ginny	Recurring role
2002	Lovebites	Maryann Moore	Lead role
2004	Secret Agent Men	Misty Rains	Guest
2007	The Millen Baird Show	Various	Lead
2008	The Table Plays	Amy	
2012	Harry	Ms. Amanaki	
2012	Golden	Elaine	Guest
2012	Auckland Daze	Mia Amway	Guest
2018	Third Term	Beth Wilson	Pilot
2019	One Lane Bridge	Dr Ruby Patterson	
2020	Shortland Street	Aggie Raymond	Guest
2023	After The Party	Bridget	Regular role
