= Interrogation (2005 TV series) =

New Zealand television series

- Created by: Gavin Strawhan
- Written by: Maxine Fleming; Scott McJorrow; Timothy Balme; Karen Curtis; Jan Prettejohns; Gavin Strawhan; Fiona Samuel; Nick Ward; Rebecca Hobbs; Dianna Fuemana
- Directed by: Murray Keane; Peter Burger; Britta Johnstone; Simon Raby; Fiona Samuel; Wayne Tourell; Popo Lilo
- Starring: Luanne Gordon; Scott Wills; Peter Elliott
- Country of origin: New Zealand
- Original language: English
- No. of seasons: 1
- No. of episodes: 13

Production
- Producer: Harriet Crampton
- Cinematography: Dave Cameron; Simon Raby
- Editor: Lisa Hough
- Running time: 45 minutes
- Production company: South Pacific Pictures

Original release
- Release: 31 August – 27 November 2005

Interrogation is a New Zealand television series that aired in 2005. It is a crime series with most of the action occurring in an interrogation room. It stars Luanne Gordon, Scott Wills and Peter Elliott who are joined by new characters each episode. There was 13 stand alone episodes scripted by many different writers.

== Cast ==
- Luanne Gordon as Detective Sergeant Angela Darley
- Scott Wills as Detective Constable Terry Skinner
- Peter Elliott as Detective Senior Sergeant Hamish Boyd
- John Leigh as Watchhouse Sergeant Phil Worth
- Jan Bunyan as Police Constable Dean Salmon
- Miriama McDowell as Police Constable Awhina James
- Brian Sagala as Sergeant Arthur Teleafava

== Episodes ==
- Tick Tock
- Money Talks
- The Naked Truth
- Where There's Smoke
- Her Own Free Will
- Hit and Run
- Girl in the Woods
- Family Matters
- As If Nothing Had Happened
- Cherchez La Femme
- You Might as Well Live
- True Confessions
- In the Name of God

== Reception ==
Michele Hewitson of the New Zealand Herald called the script of the first episode as "stinker" and writes "None of this is terrible, not quite, although the characters are terrible cliches. Despite that, some of them are fun."

== Awards ==
Air New Zealand Screen Awards 2006

- Best Supporting Actress: Claire Chitham - won
- Script - Single Episode: Fiona Samuel, for "Girl in Woods (Non-Speaking)" episode - won
- Editing - Drama: Lisa Hough - won
- Best Actress: Luanne Gordon - nominated
- Supporting Actor: Joel Tobeck - nominated
- Director - Drama/Comedy: Murray Keane - nominated
- Production Design: Brett Schwieters - nominated

Qantas Television Awards 2006

- Best Director - Drama: Murray Keane - nominated
