= The Market (TV series) =

- Created by: Rene Naufahu; Brett Ihaka; Matthew Grainger
- Directed by: Damon Fepulea’i; Geoff Cawthorn; Rene Naufahu
- Country of origin: New Zealand
- No. of episodes: 13

Production
- Producer: Rachel Jean
- Running time: 23 min

Original release
- Network: TVNZ
- Release: September 5 – December 5, 2005

The Market is a New Zealand drama series set in South Auckland's Ōtara Markets. This Romeo and Juliet story is centred on two families, one Māori (the Johnsons) and one Samoan (the Limas). It begins with the return from prison of Sef Lima, who the Johnsons claim killed Ritchie Johnson. At the same time Julia Lima returns from five years overseas (not knowing the full history) and falls for Tipene Johnson.

The Market was produced by Rachel Jean and written by Rene Naufahu, Brett Ihaka and Matthew Grainger. It was shot on location at the Ōtara Markets, town centre and surrounding locations. It was rugby player Joe Naufahu's first production. It aired on TVNZ in 2005 at 10:25pm on Monday nights before being repeated on Māori TV in 2008.

== Cast ==
- Joe Naufahu - Sef Lima
- Alina Transom - Julia Lima
- Anapela Polataivao - Ina Lima
- Dave Fane - Tu'u Lima
- Goretti Chadwick - Bonita Lima
- Dominic Ona-Ariki - Sione Lima
- Ana Tuigamala - Grandma
- Pete Smith - Chris Johnson
- Cherie James - Ngarie Johnson
- Xavier Horan - Mike Johnson
- Taungaroa Emile - Tipene Johnson
- Chris Graham - Maori Elvis
- Nathaniel Lees - Ronnie
- Joe Folau - Carlos
- Michelle Ang - Victoria Chen
- Mark Ruka - Max
- Karl Drinkwater - Tepa
- Tammy Davis - Ritchie

== Crew ==
- Rachel Jean (producer)
- Rene Naufahu (writer/director)
- Brett Ihaka (writer)
- Matthew Grainger (writer)
- Kate McDermott (script editor)
- Damon Fepulea'i (director)
- Geoff Cawthorn (director)
