= The World's Fastest Indian =

2005 New Zealand biographical film directed by Roger Donaldson

- Theatrical release poster
- Directed by: Roger Donaldson
- Written by: Roger Donaldson
- Produced by: Roger Donaldson; Gary Hannam
- Starring: Anthony Hopkins; Diane Ladd; Paul Rodriguez; Aaron Murphy
- Cinematography: David Gribble
- Edited by: John Gilbert
- Music by: J. Peter Robinson
- Production companies: OLC/Rights Entertainment; Tanlay Productions; New Zealand Film Production Fund; New Zealand Film Commission; 3 Dogs And A Pony; 2929 Entertainment; Cameo FJ Entertainment
- Distributed by: Becker Group (Australia and New Zealand); Magnolia Pictures (United States)
- Release date: 7 December 2005 (New Zealand)
- Running time: 127 minutes
- Country: New Zealand
- Language: English
- Budget: $25 million
- Box office: $18.3 million

The World's Fastest Indian is a 2005 New Zealand biographical sports drama film based on the story of New Zealand speed bike racer Burt Munro and his highly modified 1920 Indian Scout motorcycle. Munro set numerous land speed records for motorcycles with engines less than 1,000 cc at the Bonneville Salt Flats in Utah in the late 1950s and into the 1960s. The film stars Anthony Hopkins, and was produced, written and directed by Roger Donaldson.

The film opened on 7 December 2005 in New Zealand to positive reviews, and quickly became the highest grossing local film at the New Zealand box-office taking in NZ$7,043,000; and taking in over US$18,297,690 worldwide. The film was theatrically released on 3 February 2006 in the United States by Magnolia Pictures; and was subsequently released on DVD on 22 December 2006 by Magnolia Home Entertainment.

== Plot ==
In 1967, Burt Munro is a sort of folk hero in Invercargill, known for his friendly easy-going personality, for having the fastest motorcycle in New Zealand and Australia, and for being featured in Popular Mechanics magazine. However, that recognition is contrasted by his exasperated next-door neighbours, some of whom are fed up with his un-neighbourly habits, such as revving his modified 1920 Indian Scout early in the morning, urinating on his lemon tree and not mowing his grass. Burt, however, has a long-time dream; to travel to the US and test his motorcycle's capabilities at the Bonneville Speedway. However, while modifying his motorcycle, Burt suffers a heart attack. An ambulance takes him to the hospital and he is told he has angina, and is advised to take it easy and not to ride his motorcycle. Burt ignores this advice, and is given medication.

Burt is finally able to save enough to travel by cargo ship to Los Angeles, working his passage as the cook, but when he arrives, he experiences bureaucracy, skepticism and the indifference of big city people. It is his blunt but gregarious nature which overcomes each hurdle. He wins over the motel clerk, a transgender woman named Tina Washington, who assists him in clearing customs and helps him in buying a car. Fernando, the car salesman allows Burt to use his workshop and junkyard to build a trailer, and later offers him a job after Burt fine-tunes a number of the cars on the lot. Burt declines the offer, however, and shortly afterwards begins his long trip to Utah.

Along the way, Burt meets numerous helpful people, including highway police, a Native American man called Jake who aids him when his trailer fails, a woman named Ada who allows him to repair his trailer in her garage and briefly becomes his lover, and Rusty, an Air Force pilot who is on leave from military service in Vietnam.

Burt finally arrives at the Bonneville Salt Flats, only to be blocked by race officials for not registering his motorcycle for competition in advance, and not having the mandated safety equipment. In a show of sportsmanship, however, various competitors and fans in the Bonneville series intervene on his behalf, and he is eventually allowed to make a timed run. Despite various problems, he succeeds in his quest and sets a new land speed record at the 8th mile of his run when he reaches 201.851 mph (324.847 km/h). By the end, his leg is burned by the exhaust, and he then falls with the motorcycle and skids to a stop, but he is able to return home to New Zealand as a hero. An epilogue describes that Burt never gave up making his bike go faster, he returned to Bonneville nine times setting numerous records, and his 1967 record for streamlined motorcycles under 1000cc still stands.

== Cast ==
- Anthony Hopkins as Burt Munro
- Diane Ladd as Ada
- Paul Rodriguez as Fernando
- Aaron James Murphy as Tom Jackson
- Tim Shadbolt as Frank
- Annie Whittle as Fran
- Antony Starr as Jeff
- Craig Hall as Antarctic Angel
- Daniel Sing as Ken
- Chris Williams as Tina Washington
- Charles Halford as Gas Station Attendant
- Saginaw Grant as Jake
- Patrick John Flueger as Rusty
- Christopher Lawford as Jim Moffet
- Gavin Grazer as Mike Sobota
- Bruce Greenwood as Jerry
- Tim Farmer as Warren
- William Lucking as Rollie Free
- Walton Goggins as Marty Dickerson
- Eric Pierpoint as Earl
- Jessica Cauffiel as Wendy
- Chris Bruno as Bob
- Joe Howard as Otto

== Production ==
Director Roger Donaldson had been working on this film for over 20 years before he started filming it, and had previously directed a short television documentary about Burt Munro called Burt Munro: Offerings to the God of Speed in 1971. Arranging the financing for a full feature film was much more difficult, but a key Japanese investor, and Donaldson and Gary Hannam's own money, allowed the film to be made. In interviews, Anthony Hopkins stated that Munro was one of the easiest roles that he has ever played in his career, simply because Munro's view on life was not all that different from his own.

Many of the props used for filming were actually owned by Munro, including all the exploded pistons and the piston mould that Hopkins uses for a scene in the film. These were on display at the Southland Museum and Art Gallery. The location used for Burt Munro's home and workshop in New Zealand took place on an empty section on Lithgow Street in Invercargill. This section was used as the headquarters for the notorious Black Power gang during the 1990s until the house burnt down in 1998. A house has been built on the plot since the film was released. Then-Mayor of Invercargill Tim Shadbolt was given a cameo role in the film as Frank.

== Historical accuracy ==
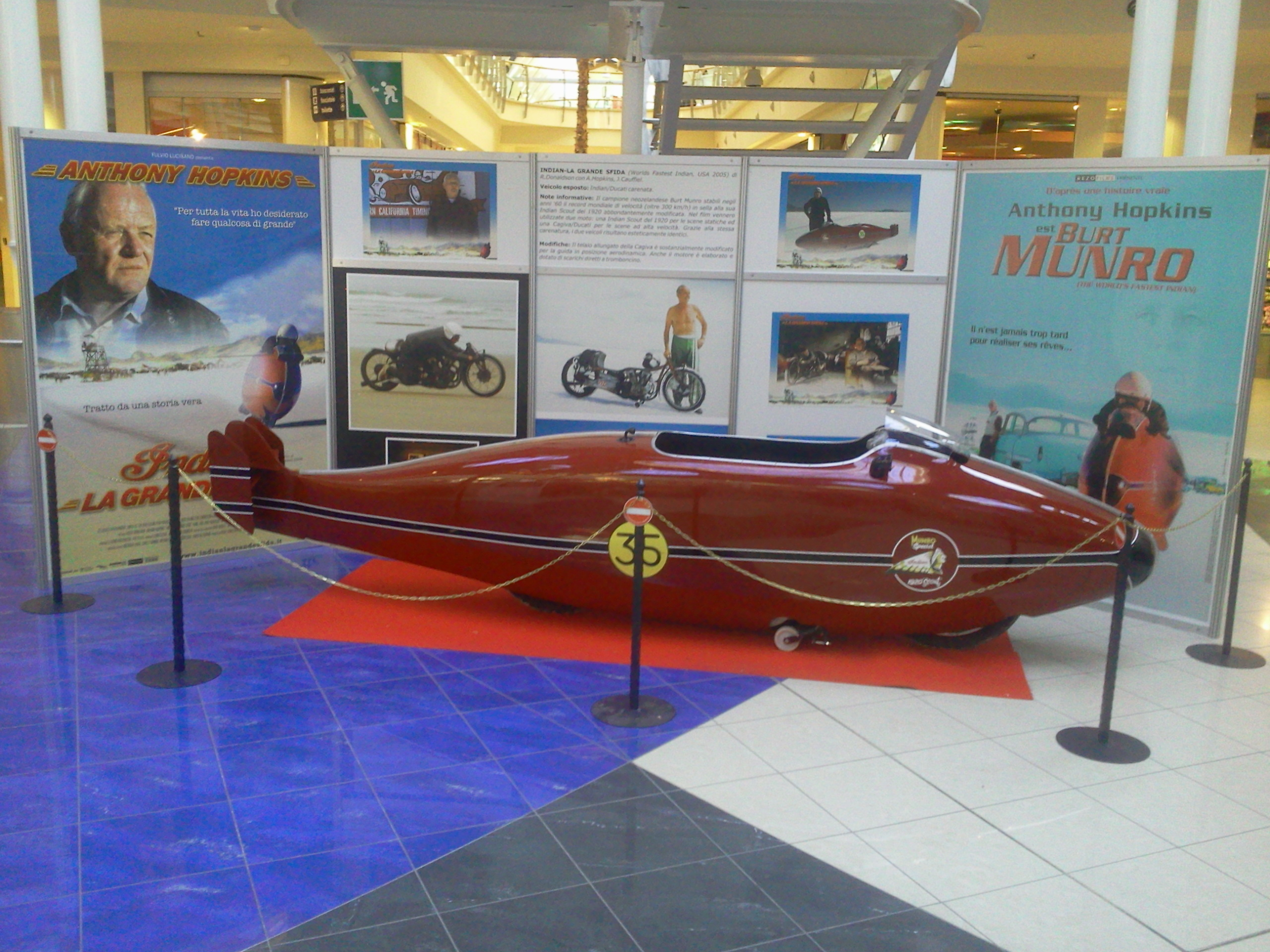
A replica of Munro's Indian used in the movie

The real Burt Munro married Florence Beryl Martyn on 6 August 1925; they divorced in 1950–51. While the couple had four children together, no mention is made of children in the film; but it is implied that he was married, and either estranged or divorced.

The Munro portrayed in the film recalls the death of a twin brother named Ernie, who died when a tree fell on him. The real Munro had an older brother who was killed when a tree fell on him. Munro also had a stillborn twin sister. The real Munro had set numerous speed records in New Zealand during the late 1930s through the early 1970s. However, these records are only implied in the film. Munro was never known to actually urinate on his lemon tree; film director Roger Donaldson added that detail as a tribute to his own father, who did.

In reality, Munro's record-breaking run at Bonneville came after several separate visits to the US, beginning in 1956. This was demonstrated, for instance, by a letter published in the May 1957 edition of Popular Mechanics (p. 6), which referred to H. A. "Dad" Munro and his 1920 Indian Scout. The visit to Bonneville shown in the film was a composite of several made by Munro. In 1962, he set a record of 178.971 mph at Bonneville. His fastest complete run there was 190.07 mph. While Munro did reach 205.67 mph on an uncompleted run, on which he crashed, he never set a record of 201 mph at Bonneville (as the film suggests).

Near the end of the film, Speed Week participants throw money into 'the hat', and Burt Munro is presented with a bag of cash before he sets the speed record. In fact, Munro had to take up a collection before Speed Week, as US Customs required a cash bond before releasing his motorcycle. A photograph of the gathered crowd presenting Munro with the bag of cash in 1962 was reprinted in a 2006 issue of Hot Rod magazine.

== Featured vehicles ==
The 1920 Indian Scout "Burt Munro Special" — the 1920 Indian Scout portrayed in the film — started life as a 600 cc motorcycle with a designed top speed of 55 mph. Munro's streamlined record-setter was substantially modified with capacity being increased to 950 cc, and a recorded speed of 205 mph. These modifications were largely done in Munro's workshop, using basic methods and tools as depicted in the film. Four motorcycles are used in the film to depict the actual "Munro Special"; two of which were replica Indian Scouts, the others being Ducatis.

Antarctic Angels Bikes — the motorcycles ridden by the New Zealand bikers comprise largely early- to mid-1960s Triumphs and BSAs. Most of these motorcycles are twin cylinder models and are 500 cc or larger. Burt's car (in New Zealand) — a 1954 Vauxhall Velox with an inline six cylinder engine — was typical of the many British-built cars common in New Zealand at the time. His car in the United States is a 1954 Chevrolet Bel Air sedan, with an inline overhead valve six cylinder engine.

== Critical reception ==
On review aggregator Rotten Tomatoes, the film holds an 83% score, based on 143 critics with an average rating of 6.9/10. The website's critics consensus reads, "Overcomes its formulaic storyline thanks to Anthony Hopkins' warm and endearing portrayal of an age-defying thrill seeker." On Metacritic, which uses a weighted average, the film holds a score of 68 out of 100, based on 32 critics, indicating "generally favorable" reviews.

=== Hopkins's portrayal of a New Zealander ===
The Welsh-born Hopkins did not employ the Kiwi accent which the real Munro would have had — the review in The New Zealand Herald said that "his vowels swoop from the Welsh valleys to the high veldt without ever alighting in Southland" (Munro's home region of New Zealand). Nevertheless, the same reviewer had said Hopkins gives a "generous, genial and utterly approachable performance … he nails the backyard eccentric genius dead centre … he has inhaled the nature of a mid-century Kiwi bloody good bloke and he inhabits the part to perfection".

== Soundtrack ==
- "You Are My Sunshine" – Jimmie Davis and Charles Mitchell
- "Kiss Twist" – Craig Hubber
