= River Queen =

2005 New Zealand-British film by Vincent Ward

- Theatrical release poster
- Directed by: Vincent Ward
- Written by: Vincent Ward; Toa Fraser; Kely Lyons
- Produced by: Chris Auty; Don Reynolds
- Starring: Samantha Morton; Kiefer Sutherland; Cliff Curtis; Temuera Morrison; Stephen Rea
- Cinematography: Alun Bollinger
- Edited by: Ewa J. Lind
- Music by: Karl Jenkins
- Production companies: Silverscreen Films; The Film Consortium; New Zealand Film Commission; UK Film Council; Endgame Entertainment; New Zealand Film Production Fund; Capital Pictures; Wayward Films
- Distributed by: 20th Century Fox (Australia and New Zealand); The Works UK Distribution Ltd. Universal Pictures (United Kingdom)
- Release dates: 12 September 2005 (TIFF); 26 January 2006 (New Zealand)
- Running time: 114 minutes
- Countries: New Zealand; United Kingdom
- Languages: English; Maori
- Budget: $24,030,000 (NZ)
- Box office: $915,442

River Queen is a 2005 war drama film written and directed by Vincent Ward and starring Samantha Morton, Kiefer Sutherland, Cliff Curtis, Temuera Morrison and Stephen Rea. The film garnered mixed reviews but performed well at the box office in New Zealand.

== Plot ==
The film takes place in New Zealand in 1868 during Tītokowaru's War phase of the New Zealand Wars between the Māori and New Zealand colonial forces. Sarah O'Brien (Samantha Morton) has grown up among soldiers in a frontier garrison on Te Awa Nui, the Great River. Pregnant at 16 by a young Māori boy, she gives birth to a son. Sarah was distraught when her son named Boy, is kidnapped by his Māori grandfather seven years later. Abandoned by her soldier father, Sarah's life revolved around the search for her son. Her only friend, Doyle (Kiefer Sutherland) is a broken-down soldier without the means to help her.

She was lured to the ill rebel chief Te Kai Po's village for a chance to see her child, Sarah found herself falling in love with Boy's uncle, Wiremu (Cliff Curtis) and increasingly drawn to the village way of life.

Using the medical skills she learned from her father, Sarah heals Te Kai Po (Temuera Morrison) and began to reconcile with her son (Rawiri Pene). But her idyllic time at the village is shattered when she realised that she has healed the chief only to hear him declare war on the Colonials—the men she identifies as her friends, her only family. Her desperation deepened when she found out that Boy intends to prove himself in the war, refusing to go back down river with her. As the conflict escalates, Sarah finds herself at the centre of the storm, torn by the love she feels for Boy and Wiremu, anguished over the attachments she still has to the white man's world, and sickened by the brutality she witnessed on either side.

And when the moment comes, Sarah must choose where she truly belongs. Will she be forced back into the white man's way of life, or will she have the courage to follow the instincts that are telling her to remain where she belongs?

== Cast ==
- Samantha Morton as Sarah O'Brien
- Kiefer Sutherland as Doyle
- Cliff Curtis as Wiremu
- Temuera Morrison as Te Kai Po
- Stephen Rea as Francis
- Anton Lesser as Major Baine
- Rawiri Pene as Sarah's son
- Danielle Cormack as Viola

== Production ==
Sam Neill was originally favoured by Vincent Ward to be cast in a leading role, but he declined.

Director Vincent Ward was dismissed from the film towards the end of the shoot to be replaced by cinematographer Alun Bollinger and then in an unusual reversal, was rehired just weeks later for six months of editing and additional shooting in both New Zealand and England. Primary filming was done on the Whanganui River.

The film features the song "Danny Boy" sung in Māori and English. The film is set in 1868, and the lyrics for "Danny Boy" were written in 1910 and adapted to the traditional Irish melody "Londonderry Air". It is possible the melody was known in New Zealand at the time, but another 42 years were to pass before the lyrics were written by Frederic Weatherly.

== Reception ==
The film topped the New Zealand Box Office on its first weekend of release.

Alexander Bisley of The Dominion Post says "River Queen convinces that you don't have to be indigenous to tell indigenous stories. Ward who lived for 18 months as the sole Pākehā (person of European descent) in a remote Māori community in the Ureweras, deserves a lot of mana (respect). This is his story, this is my story, this is your story - every New Zealander should see River Queen."

== Awards and recognition ==
=== Fair International Film Festival 2007 ===
- Best Artistic Achievements Award

=== New Zealand Screen Awards 2006 ===
- Won: Best Achievement in Cinematography: Alun Bollinger
- Won: Best Achievement in Costume Design: Barbara Darragh
- Nominated: Best Performance by an Actor in a Leading Role: Cliff Curtis
- Nominated: Best Achievement in Production Design: Rick Kofoed
- Nominated: Best Performance by an Actress in a Leading Role: Samantha Morton
- Nominated: Best Performance by Actor in a Supporting Role: Rawiri Pene
- Nominated: Best Picture: Don Reynolds, Chris Auty

=== Shanghai International Film Festival 2006 ===
- Won: Golden Goblet, Best Music: Karl Jenkins
