= The Strip (New Zealand TV series) =

- Created by: Alan Brash
- Starring: Luanne Gordon; Jodie Rimmer; Renée Ellwood; Robbie Magasiva; David Fane; Susana Lei'ataua; Stephen Bain; Stephen Lovatt; Janice Finn; Eddie Campbell; Michelle Langstone
- Opening theme: "Life Is So Sweet" by Garageland
- Composer: Gareth Farr
- Country of origin: New Zealand
- Original language: English
- No. of seasons: 2
- No. of episodes: 40

Production
- Producer: Dave Gibson
- Cinematography: Simon Baumfield; Richard Bluck; Neil Cervin; Rocky Hudson
- Editors: Paul Sutorius; Owen Ferrier-Kerr; Simon James; Gary Hunt
- Production company: The Gibson Group

Original release
- Network: TV3
- Release: 5 March 2002 – 11 November 2003

The Strip is the story of corporate lawyer Melissa Walker, who decides her life needs a new direction and quits her job after finding her husband in bed with his male lover. She opens a male strip club, catering especially for women. The series aired in New Zealand from 2002 to 2003 and has been syndicated in the United States on Vibrant TV Network.

== Cast ==
- Luanne Gordon as Melissa Walker, owner/manager of "Man Alive", mother to Paige
- Jodie Rimmer as Kathryn Moore, another corporate lawyer and Mel's best friend
- Renée Ellwood as Paige Walker, Melissa's teen tearaway daughter
- Robbie Magasiva as Adam Lima, the sexy head stripper at Mel's club
- David Fane as Jack Sione, the barman at Mel's club
- Susana Lei'ataua as Samara Sione, Jack's cousin, choreographer at "Man Alive" (season 1)
- Stephen Bain as Glenn Walker, Paige's father, Mel's soon-to-be ex-husband
- Stephen Lovatt as Det. Shane Robertson, a cop who Mel gets involved with (season 1)
- Janice Finn as Leslie Lonsdale, Mel's slightly crazy mother
- Eddie Campbell as Vince Cleaver, manager of the neighbouring Gates of Heaven men's strip club
- Michelle Langstone as Tre, somewhat eccentric choreographer at "Man Alive" (season 2)

=== The Strippers ===
- Taika Cohen as Mostin
- Craig Hall as Clint
- Mark Sant as Ian
- Dion Murphy as Daniel
- Stephen Handisides as Billy
- Kelson Henderson as Cal
- Mike Edward as Finn
- Boyd Bishop as Richard

=== Other regulars ===
- Loren Horsley as Danielle, a stripper at "Gates of Heaven"
- Nicole Whippy as Chocolate, a stripper at "Gates of Heaven"
- Brian Sergent as Ian "Dogwood" Douglas, Mel's boss at the law firm
- Jess Peters as Cherie, co-worker of Mel & Kathryn
- Sally Martin as Gemma, co-worker of Mel & Kathryn
- Dan Caddy as Josh, Paige's boyfriend
- Jeff Whiting as Mick, landlord of the premises, who Mel hooks up with in Season 2
