= 2009 Cannes Film Festival =

62nd Cannes Film Festival
- The poster shows a still from the film L'Avventura by Michelangelo Antonioni.
- Opening film: Up
- Closing film: Coco Chanel & Igor Stravinsky
- Location: Cannes, France
- Founded: 1946
- Awards: Palme d'Or: The White Ribbon
- Hosted by: Édouard Baer
- No. of films: 20 (In Competition)
- Festival date: 13–24 May 2009
- Website: festival-cannes.com

Cannes Film Festival
- 2010 2008

The 62nd Cannes Film Festival took place from 13 May to 24 May 2009. French actress Isabelle Huppert served as jury president for the main competition. Austrian filmmaker Michael Haneke won the Palme d'Or, the festival's top prize, for the mystery drama film The White Ribbon.

The festival opened with Up by Pete Docter, marking the first time that an animated film opened the festival, and closed with Coco Chanel & Igor Stravinsky by Jan Kounen.

American filmmaker Clint Eastwood became the second recipient of the Honorary Palme d'Or.

== Juries ==
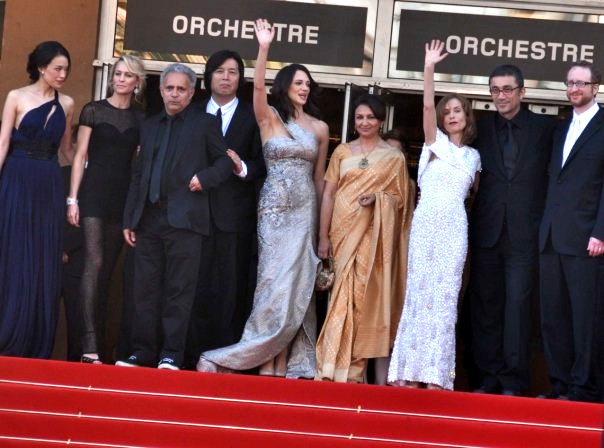
The members of the main competition jury.

=== Main competition ===
- Isabelle Huppert, French actress – Jury President
- Asia Argento, Italian actress
- Nuri Bilge Ceylan, Turkish filmmaker
- James Gray, American filmmaker
- Hanif Kureishi, British screenwriter
- Lee Chang-dong, South Korean filmmaker
- Shu Qi, Taiwanese actress
- Sharmila Tagore, Indian actress
- Robin Wright, American actress

=== Un Certain Regard ===
- Paolo Sorrentino, Italian filmmaker – Jury President
- Uma Da Cunha, Indian casting director and production consultant
- Julie Gayet, French actress and film producer
- Piers Handling, Canadian director and CEO of TIFF
- Marit Kapla, Swedish culture journalist

=== Caméra d'Or ===
- Roschdy Zem, French actor and filmmaker – Jury President
- Diane Baratier, French cinematographer
- Olivier Chiavassa, French member of the fédération des Industries Techniques
- Sandrine Ray, French filmmaker
- Charles Tesson, French critic
- Edouard Waintrop, director of the Festival Fribourg

=== Cinéfondation and short films ===
- John Boorman, English filmmaker – Jury President
- Bertrand Bonello, French filmmaker
- Férid Boughedir, Tunisian filmmaker
- Leonor Silveira, Portuguese actress
- Zhang Ziyi, Chinese actress and model

== Official Selection ==
=== In Competition ===
The following films were selected to compete for the Palme d'Or:

English Title	Original Title	Director(s)	Production Country
Antichrist		Lars von Trier	Denmark, France, Italy, Germany, Poland, Sweden
Bright Star		Jane Campion	United Kingdom, Australia, France
Broken Embraces	Los abrazos rotos	Pedro Almodóvar	Spain
Butchered	Kinatay	Brillante Mendoza	Philippines, France, Japan, Netherlands
Enter the Void		Gaspar Noé	France, Germany, Italy
Face	臉	Tsai Ming-liang	Taiwan, France
Fish Tank		Andrea Arnold	United Kingdom
Inglourious Basterds		Quentin Tarantino	United States, Germany
In the Beginning	À l'origine	Xavier Giannoli	France
Looking for Eric		Ken Loach	United Kingdom, France, Italy, Belgium, Spain
Map of the Sounds of Tokyo	Mapa de los sonidos de Tokyo	Isabel Coixet	Spain
A Prophet	Un prophète	Jacques Audiard	France, Italy
Spring Fever	春风沉醉的晚上	Lou Ye	Hong Kong, France
Taking Woodstock		Ang Lee	United States
Thirst	박쥐	Park Chan-wook	South Korea, United States
The Time That Remains		Elia Suleiman	Palestine, United Kingdom, Italy, Belgium, France
Wild Grass	Les herbes folles	Alain Resnais	France
Vincere		Marco Bellocchio	Italy, France
Vengeance	復仇	Johnnie To	Hong Kong, France
The White Ribbon	Das weiße Band	Michael Haneke	Germany

=== Un Certain Regard ===
The following films were selected for the competition of Un Certain Regard:

English Title	Original Title	Director(s)	Production Country
Adrift	À Deriva	Heitor Dhalia	Brazil
Air Doll	空気人形	Hirokazu Koreeda	Japan
Dogtooth	Κυνόδοντας	Yorgos Lanthimos	Greece
Eyes Wide Open	עיניים פקוחות	Haim Tabakman	Israel
Father of My Children	Le père de mes enfants	Mia Hansen-Løve	France
Independence	Independencia	Raya Martin	Philippines
Irene		Alain Cavalier	France
Mother	마더	Bong Joon-ho	South Korea
No One Knows About Persian Cats	کسی از گربه های ایرانی خبر نداره	Bahman Ghobadi	Iran
Nymph	Nang Mai	Pen-Ek Ratanaruang	Thailand
Police, Adjective	Poliţist, Adjectiv	Corneliu Porumboiu	Romania
Precious	Precious: Based on the Novel "Push" by Sapphire	Lee Daniels	United States
Samson and Delilah		Warwick Thornton	Australia
The Silent Army	Wit Licht	Jean van de Velde	Netherlands
Tale in the Darkness	Сказка про темноту	Nikolay Khomeriki	Russia
Tales from the Golden Age	Amintiri din epoca de aur	Cristian Mungiu, Hanno Höfer, Constantin Popescu and Ioana Uricaru	Romania
To Die like a Man	Morrer Como Um Homem	João Pedro Rodrigues	Portugal
Tomorrow at Dawn	Demain dès l'aube	Denis Dercourt	France
Tsar	Царь	Pavel Lungin	Russia
The Wind Journeys	Los viajes del viento	Ciro Guerra	Colombia, Germany, Netherlands, Argentina

=== Out of Competition ===
The following films were selected to be screened out of competition:

English Title	Original Title	Director(s)	Production Country
Agora	Ágora	Alejandro Amenábar	Spain
The Army of Crime	L'armée du crime	Robert Guédiguian	France
Coco Chanel & Igor Stravinsky (closing film)		Jan Kounen	France
Don't Look Back	Ne te retourne pas	Marina de Van	France
Drag Me to Hell		Sam Raimi	United States
The Imaginarium of Doctor Parnassus		Terry Gilliam	United Kingdom, Canada, France
A Town Called Panic	Panique au village	Stéphane Aubier and Vincent Patar	Belgium, France, Luxembourg
Up (opening film)		Pete Docter	United States

=== Special Screenings ===
The following films were selected to be screened at the Special Screenings section:

English Title	Original Title	Director(s)	Production Country
Ashes and Blood	Cendres et sang	Fanny Ardant	France, Romania, Portugal
A Brand New Life	여행자	Ounie Lecomte	South Korea
The Eye of the Storm	No Meu Lugar	Eduardo Valente	Brazil
Group Portrait With Kids and Motorcycles	Portrait de Groupe Avec Enfants et Motocyclettes	Pierre-William Glenn	France
Jaffa	כלת הים	Keren Yedaya	Israel
Manila		Adolfo Alix Jr. and Raya Martin	Philippines
My Neighbor, My Killer	Mon voisin, mon tueur	Anne Aghion	France, United States
Petition	上访	Zhao Liang	China
Tell Me Who You Are	Min Ye	Souleymane Cissé	Mali, France
The Thorn in the Heart	L'épine dans le coeur	Michel Gondry	France

=== Cinéfondation ===
The following short films were selected for the Cinéfondation competition:

English title	Original title	Director(s)	School
#1		Noamir Castéra	ENSAV La Cambre, Belgium
Bába		Zuzana Kirchnerová	FAMU, Czech Republic
The Boxer	El boxeador	Juan Ignacio Pollio	Universidad del Cine, Argentina
By the Grace of God		Ralitza Petrova	NFTS, United Kingdom
Chapa		Thiago Ricarte	FAAP, Brazil
Diploma		Yaelle Kayam	The Sam Spiegel Film & TV School, Israel
Don't Step Out of the House	남매의 집	Jo Sung-hee	Korean Academy of Film Arts, South Korea
Goodbye		Fang Song	Beijing Film Academy, China
Gutter		Dan Ransom Day	New York University, United States
The Horn	뿔	Yim Kyung-dong	Kaywon School of Art, South Korea
Kasia		Elisabet Llado	IAD, Belgium
The Naturalist	Il Naturalista	Giulia Barbera	Centro Sperimentale di Cinematografia, Italy
The Setback	Le Contretemps	Dominique Baumard	La fémis, France
Significant Others	Malzonkowie	Dara Van Dusen	PWSFTViT, Poland
Segal		Yuval Shani	Tel-Aviv University, Israel
The Sylpphid	Sylfidden	Dorte Bengtson	Den Danske Filmskole, Denmark
Traverser		Hugo Frassetto	La Poudrière, France

=== Short Film Competition ===
The following short films were selected to compete for the Short Film Palme d'Or:

English title	Original title	Director(s)	Production Country
After Tomorrow		Emma Sullivan	United Kingdom
Arena		João Salaviza	Portugal
Ciao mama	Ciao mama	Goran Odvorcic	Croatia
Lars and Peter	Lars og Peter	Daniel Borgman	Denmark
The Man in the Blue Gordini	L'Homme À la Gordini	Jean-Christophe Lie	France
Missing	Missen	Jochem de Vries	Netherlands
Silence	Klusums	Laila Pakalniņa	Latvia
The Six Dollar Fifty Man		Mark Albiston and Louis Sutherland	New Zealand
Worstward Ho	Rumbo a Peor	Àlex Brendemühl	Spain

=== Cannes Classics ===
The following films were selected to be screened at the Cannes Classics sections:

English title	Original title	Director(s)	Production Country
Restored Prints
The 400 Blows (1959)	Les quatre cents coups	François Truffaut	France
Accident (1967)		Joseph Losey	United Kingdom
L'Avventura (1960)		Michelangelo Antonioni	France, Italy
The Birds, the Bees and the Italians (1966)	Signore & signori	Pietro Germi	Italy
A Brighter Summer Day (1991)	牯嶺街少年殺人事件	Edward Yang	Taiwan
Duck, You Sucker! (1971)	Giù la testa	Sergio Leone	Italy, United States
Eyes Without a Face (1960)	Les yeux sans visage	Georges Franju	France
Far from Vietnam (1967)	Loin du Vietnam	Chris Marker, Joris Ivens, Claude Lelouch, Jean-Luc Godard, William Klein, Agnès Varda and Alain Resnais	France
God Does Not Believe in Us Anymore (1982)	An uns glaubt Gott nicht mehr	Axel Corti	Austria, West Germany
The Housemaid (1960)	하녀	Kim Ki-young	South Korea
The Molly Maguires (1970)		Martin Ritt	United States
Monsieur Hulot's Holiday (1953)	Les Vacances de Monsieur Hulot	Jacques Tati	France
The Night of Counting the Years (1969)	المومياء	Shadi Abdel Salam	Egypt
Pierrot le fou (1965)		Jean-Luc Godard	France
The Red Shoes (1948)		Michael Powell and Emeric Pressburger	United Kingdom
Victim (1961)		Basil Dearden	United Kingdom
Wake in Fright (1971)		Ted Kotcheff	Australia
The Wave (1936)	Redes	Emilio Gómez Muriel and Fred Zinnemann	Mexico
Documentaries about Cinema
Henri-Georges Clouzot's Inferno	L'Enfer d'Henri-Georges Clouzot	Serge Bromberg and Ruxandra Medrea	France
Images from the Playground	Bilder från lekstugan	Stig Björkman	Sweden
Pietro Germi – The Good, the Beautiful and the Brave	Pietro Germi - Il bravo, il bello, il cattivo	Claudio Bondi	Italy
Two of the New Wave	Deux de la Vague	Emmanuel Laurent	France

=== Cinéma de la Plage ===
The following films were screened outdoors at the beach cinema of Cannes:

English title	Original title	Director(s)	Production Country
Lawrence of Arabia (1962)		David Lean	United States, United Kingdom
Neil Young Trunk Show (2008)		Jonathan Demme	United States
Pink Floyd – The Wall (1982)		Alan Parker	United Kingdom
Soundtrack for a Revolution		Dan Sturman and Bill Guttentag	United States, France, United Kingdom
Tengri: Blue Heavens (2008)	Tengri, le bleu du ciel	Marie-Jaoul de Poncheville	Germany, France, Kyrgyzstan
Total Balalaika Show (1993)		Aki Kaurismäki	Finland, Sweden
Wattstax (1972)		Mel Stuart	United States
Ziggy Stardust and the Spiders from Mars (1973)		D. A. Pennebaker	United Kingdom

== Parallel Sections ==
=== Critics' Week ===
The following films were selected to be screened at the 48th Semaine de la Critique:

English Title	Original Title	Director(s)	Production Country
In Competition
Altiplano		Peter Brosens and Jessica Woodworth	Belgium, Germany, Netherlands
Bad Day to Go Fishing	Mal día para pescar	Álvaro Brechner	Uruguay, Spain
Goodbye Gary Cooper	Adieu Gary	Nassim Amaouche	France
Huacho		Alejandro Fernández Almendras	Chile, France, Germany
Lost Persons Area		Caroline Strubbe	Belgium
Whisper with the Wind	Sirta la gal ba	Shahram Alidi	Iraq, Iran
Special Screenings
Hierro		Gabe Ibáñez	Spain
Lascars	Round da Way	Albert Pereira-Lazaro and Emmanuel Klotz	France
The Ordinary People	Rien de personnel	Mathias Gokalp	France
Short Films Competition
It's Free for Girls	C’est gratuit pour les filles	Marie Amachoukeli and Claire Burger	France
Logorama		François Alaux, Hervé de Crécy and Ludovic Houplain	France
Noche adentro		Pablo Lamar	Paraguay, Argentina
Runaway		Cordell Barker	Canada
Seeds of the Fall	Slitage	Patrik Eklund	Sweden
Together		Eicke Bettinga	Germany, United Kingdom
Tulum	La Virée	Dalibor Matanić	Croatia
Short Films – Special Screenings
1989		Camilo Matiz	Colombia
6 Hours		Seong-hyeok Moon	South Korea
La Baie du renard		Grégoire Colin	France
Crumbs	Les Miettes	Pierre Pinaud	France
Elo		Vera Egito	Brazil
Faiblesses		Nicolas Giraud	France
Spread Through the Air	Espalhadas pelo Ar	Vera Egito	Brazil

=== Directors' Fortnight (Quinzaine des Réalizateurs) ===
The following films were selected to be screened:

English Title	Original Title	Director(s)	Production Country
Ajami	عجمي / עג'מי	Scandar Copti and Yaron Shani	Israel, Palestine, Germany, United Kingdom
Amreeka		Cherien Dabis	United States, Canada, Kuwait, Palestine
Carcasses		Denis Côté	Canada
Change Nothing	Ne change rien	Pedro Costa	Portugal, France
Christmas	Navidad	Sebastián Lelio	Chile, France
Daddy Longlegs	Go Get Some Rosemary	Benny Safdie and Josh Safdie	United States
Daniel & Ana	Daniel y Ana	Michel Franco	Mexico
Earth Madness	La Terre de la folie	Luc Moullet	France
Eastern Plays	Източни пиеси	Kamen Kalev	Bulgaria
The French Kissers	Les Beaux Gosses	Riad Sattouf	France
Here		Ho Tzu Nyen	Singapore
Humpday		Lynn Shelton	United States
I Love You Phillip Morris		Glenn Ficarra and John Requa	France, United States
I Killed My Mother	J’ai tué ma mère	Xavier Dolan	Canada
Karaoke		Chris Chong Chan Fui	Malaysia
The King of Escape	Le Roi de l’évasion	Alain Guiraudie	France
Like You Know It All	잘 알지도 못하면서	Hong Sang-soo	South Korea
The Little One	La Pivellina	Rainer Frimmel and Tizza Covi	Austria
The Misfortunates	De Helaasheid der Dingen	Felix van Groeningen	Belgium
Oxhide II	牛皮贰	Liu Jiayin	China
Polytechnique		Denis Villeneuve	Canada
Tetro		Francis Ford Coppola	United States, Argentina, Spain, Italy
The Wolberg Family	La Famille Wolberg	Axelle Ropert	France, Belgium
Yuki & Nina	ユキとニナ	Hippolyte Girardot and Nobuhiro Suwa	Japan, France
Special Screenings
Firefly (2000)	組画	Naomi Kawase	Japan
Montparnasse		Mikhaël Hers	France

=== Short films ===
- American Minor by Charlie White (8 min)
- Anna by Rúnar Rúnarsson (35 min)
- El ataque de los robots de Nebulosa-5 by Chema García Ibarra (7 min)
- Canção de amor e saúde by João Nicolau (35 min)
- Cicada by Amiel Courtin-Wilson (9 min)
- Drömmar från skogen by Johannes Nyholm (9 min)
- Dust Kid by Jung Yumi (10 min)
- The Fugitives by Guillaume Leiter (25 min)
- The History of Aviation by Bálint Kenyeres (15 min)
- Jagdfieber (The Hunting Fever) by Alessandro Comodin (22 min)
- John Wayne Hated Horses by Andrew T. Betzer (10 min)
- Nice by Maud Alpi (25 min)
- SuperBarroco by Renata Pinheiro (17 min)
- Thermidor by Virgil Vernier (17 min)

== Official Awards ==
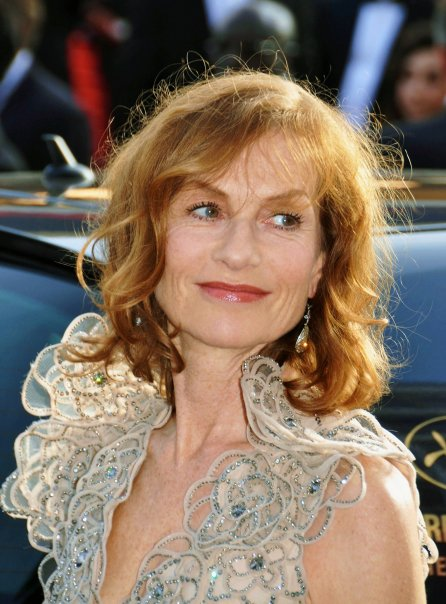
Isabelle Huppert, President of the 2009 Competition Jury

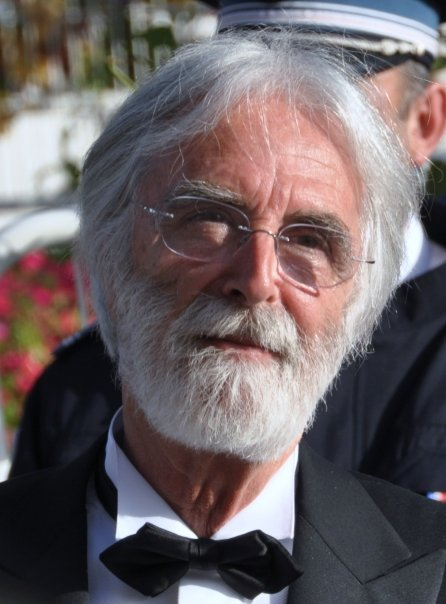
Michael Haneke, winner of the 2009 Palme d'Or

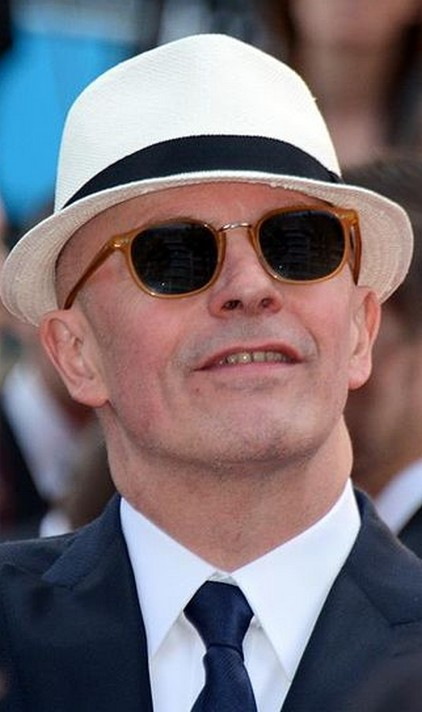
Jacques Audiard, winner of the 2009 Grand Prix

The following films and people received the 2009 Official selection awards:

=== In Competition ===
- Palme d'Or: The White Ribbon by Michael Haneke
- Grand Prix: A Prophet by Jacques Audiard
- Best Director: Brillante Mendoza for Kinatay
- Best Screenplay: Mei Feng for Spring Fever
- Best Actress: Charlotte Gainsbourg for Antichrist
- Best Actor: Christoph Waltz for Inglourious Basterds
- Prix du Jury:
  - Thirst by Park Chan-wook
  - Fish Tank by Andrea Arnold
- Lifetime Achievement Award: Alain Resnais

=== Honorary Palm d'Or ===
- Clint Eastwood

=== Un Certain Regard ===
- Prix Un Certain Regard: Dogtooth by Yorgos Lanthimos
- Un Certain Regard Jury Prize: Police, Adjective by Corneliu Porumboiu
- Un Certain Regard Special Jury Prize:
  - No One Knows About Persian Cats by Bahman Ghobadi
  - Father of My Children by Mia Hansen-Løve

=== Cinéfondation ===
- First Prize: Bába by Zuzana Kirchnerová
- Second Prize: Goodbye by Fang Song
- Third Prize:
  - Diploma by Yaelle Kayam
  - Nammae Ui Jip by Jo Sung-hee

=== Caméra d'Or ===
- Samson and Delilah by Warwick Thornton
  - Special Mention: Ajami by Scandar Copti and Yaron Shani

=== Short Films Competition ===
- Short Film Palme d'Or: Arena by João Salaviza
  - Special Mention: The Six Dollar Fifty Man by Mark Albiston, Louis Sutherland

== Independent awards ==
=== FIPRESCI Prizes ===
- The White Ribbon by Michael Haneke (In Competition)
- Police, Adjective by Corneliu Porumboiu (Un Certain Regard)
- Amreeka by Cherien Dabis (Directors' Fortnight)

=== Vulcan Award of the Technical Artist ===
- Aitor Berenguer (sound mixer) for Map of the Sounds of Tokyo

=== Prize of the Ecumenical Jury ===
- Looking for Eric by Ken Loach
  - Special Mention: The White Ribbon by Michael Haneke

=== Critics' Week ===
- Critics' Week Grand Prize: Adieu Gary by Nassim Amaouche
- SACD Award: Lost Persons Area by Caroline Strubbe
- ACID/CCAS Award: Whisper with the wind by Shahram Alidi
- OFAJ/TV5MONDE Young Critics Award: Whisper with the wind by Shahram Alidi
- Canal+ Gran Prix for short film: Seeds of the Fall by Patrik Eklund
- Kodak Discovery Award for Best Short Film: Logorama by François Alaux, Hervé de Crécy, Ludovic Houplain (H5)

=== Regards Jeunes Prize ===
- Whisper with the wind by Shahram Alidi

=== Prix François Chalais ===
- No One Knows About Persian Cats by Bahman Ghobadi
