= Flickerfest =

Flickerfest is an international short film festival held annually in January at Bondi Beach, Sydney, Australia. It is an Academy and BAFTA recognised short film festival for both international and Australian film makers.

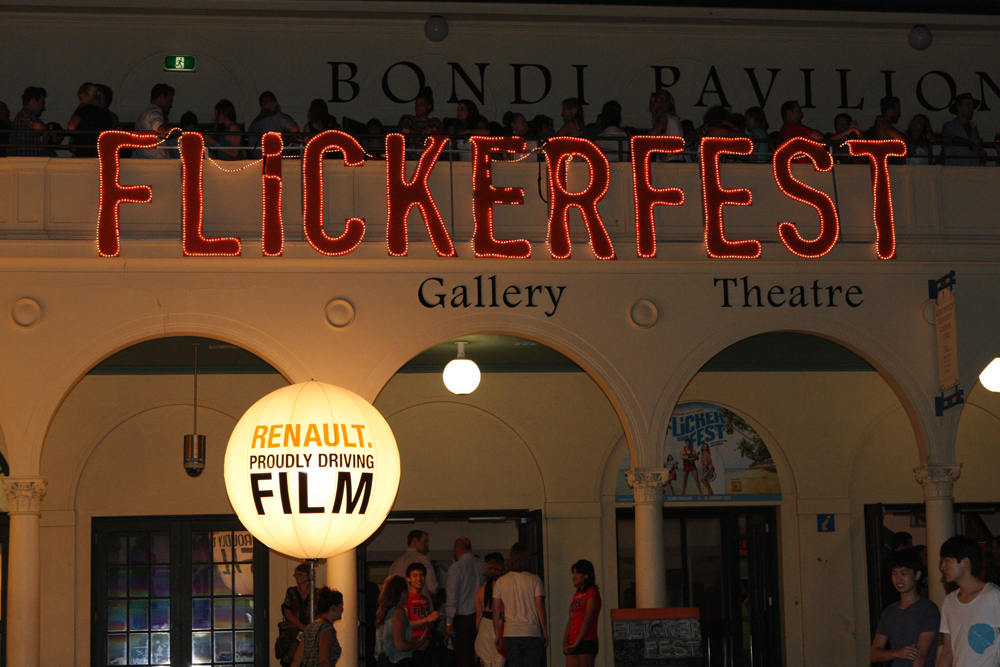
Flickerfest opens at Bondi Pavilion on 11 January 2013.

== History ==
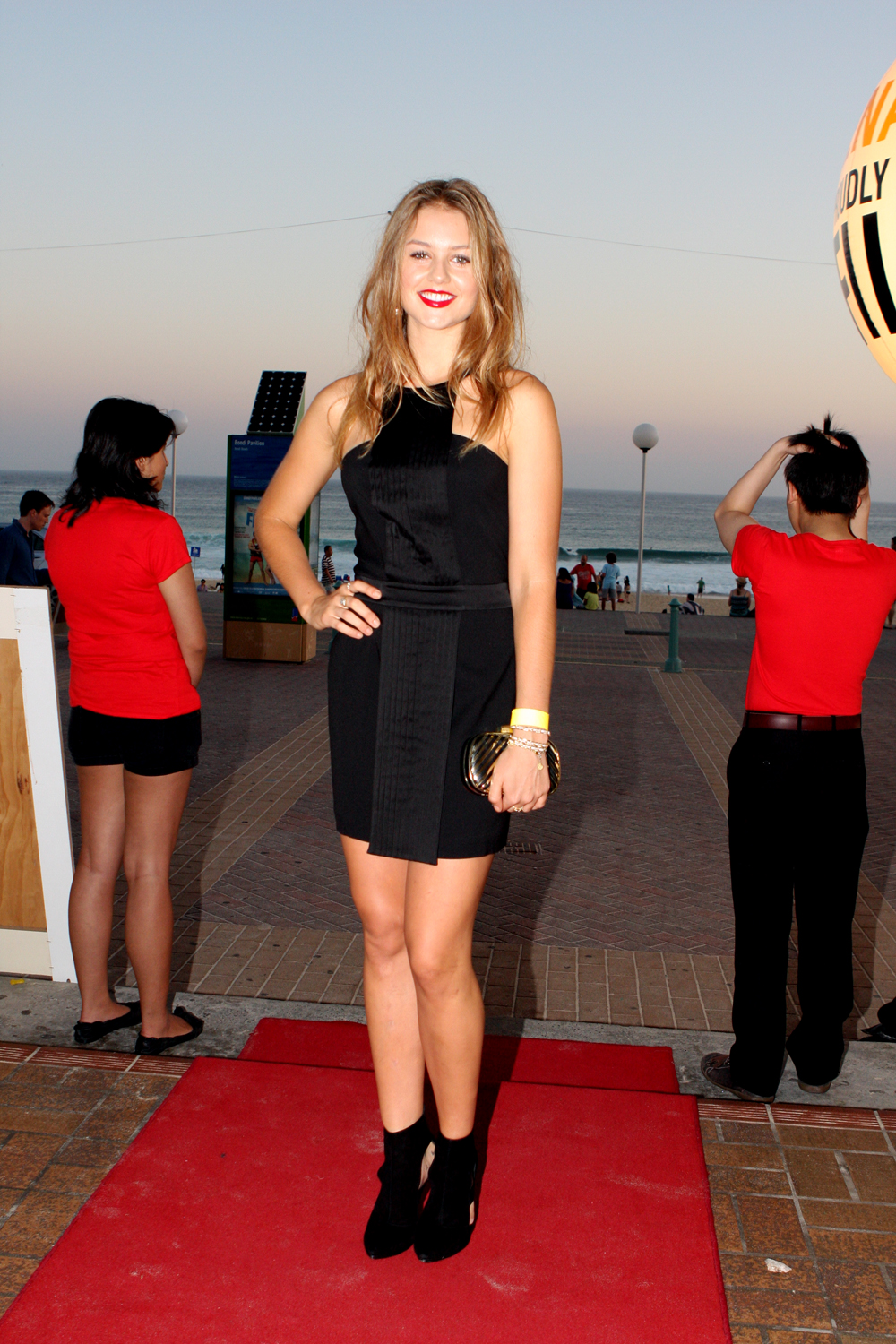
Isabelle Cornish at the festival's opening night with Bondi Beach in the background.

The festival originated as a small, local festival at Balmain High School in 1991. It has premiered an increasingly broader range of international short films since its establishment.

In 2003, Flickerfest was recognised by the Academy of Motion Picture Arts and Science to qualify for Best Animation and Best Short Film categories of the Academy Awards.

In 2010, the British Academy of Film and Television Arts (BAFTA) recognised that if a film from the UK won a category at Flickerfest, the film then became eligible for a BAFTA nomination.

In 2013, Flickerfest received Academy accreditation for the Australian competition and in 2014 the Documentary section of the festival received Academy accreditation.

Since 1991, Flickerfest has grown substantially. By 2018, the festival had grown to include 22 programmes shown, over 2,500 entries and 100 international shorts being showcased at the event.

In 2020 Flickerfest was impacted by the COVID-19 pandemic in Australia. Flickerfest Canberra was due to run in April but was postponed.

Bondi Flickerfest 2021, the 30th anniversary event is scheduled for 22–31 January. It will be run in a COVID-19 safe manner.

== Management ==
Bronwyn Kidd is the festival's director as of 2018. Kidd curates several hundred short films for the annual event, and the following national tour. She has also contributed to the curation of international film festivals such as the former London Australian Film Festival at The Barbican.

Flickerfest's production and tour manager is Shane Rennie, who has been involved in the production of Flickerfest since 2000. Rennie is involved in web population, technical presentation, festival production, and festival photography, and is also a member of the Flickerfest selection committee. Since 2005, he has organised the Flickerfest National Tour, working directly with venues that the tour will be held at to establish dates, media and online strategies, programme suggestions, and logistics.

Leigh Russell is the Industry Liaison and primary coordinator of the 2018 Flickerfest jury and FlickerUp, a nationwide competition for primary and high school students.

== Entry requirements and eligibility ==
For films to be eligible to be shown in Flickerfest they must meet the entry requirements are:

- All short films should not exceed 35 minutes.
- The film must be completed within two years of the closure of the entry date.
- Films must either be in English or be provided with English subtitles.
- All films must be compatible with the H.264 or ProRes format.
- With exception to other Australian festivals that are Academy qualifying, Flickerfest favours Australian films that are Australian premieres.
- International short films are favoured if it is their Australian premiere.
- Before the beginning of the competition, all films must not be available to access on the internet or broadcast throughout Australia.

== Programmes ==
Throughout the duration of the festival, short films are showcased that are of a competitive and non-competitive nature. These films are presented in eight different categories.

- Best of Australian – The category showcases the films short listed for the Academy accredited award "Best Australian Short Film". In 2018, there were seven separate screenings of the competition, ranging between seven and nine individual films every screening.
- Best of International – The category shows international films in competition for the awards; Best Short Animation and Best Short Drama which are both Academy accredited awards. In 2018, the programme was separated into five parts, premiering seven films in each screening.
- FlickerKids – This section of the festival is non-competitive. It showcases films that are "delightfully entertaining" and that will "appeal to the kid in everyone”. In 2018, 11 films were shown in this category with only one screening.
- Best of Documentary – The category showcases the films short listed for the Academy accredited award "Best Documentary Short Film". In 2018, there were two separate screening of the competition, with seven films being shown in each individual screening.
- Best of EU Shorts – A non-competitive section of the festival. It showcases shorts that are "moving and entertaining" that are drawn from within the European Union. In 2018, the programme was showcased in two sections with seven films shown in each part.
- Short Laughs Comedy – This category of the festival is non-competitive. It showcases international "hilarious off-kilter" shorts. In 2018, the section was shown in two sections with ten films shown in each section.
- FlickerUp – This category showcases the finalists of the national competition for primary and secondary school aged students or individuals under the age of 18. In 2018, the section consisted of 22 short films.
- Rainbow Shorts – A non-competitive section that celebrates international LGBTQI stories. The section premiered in 2018 with seven films in the programme.

== Tour ==
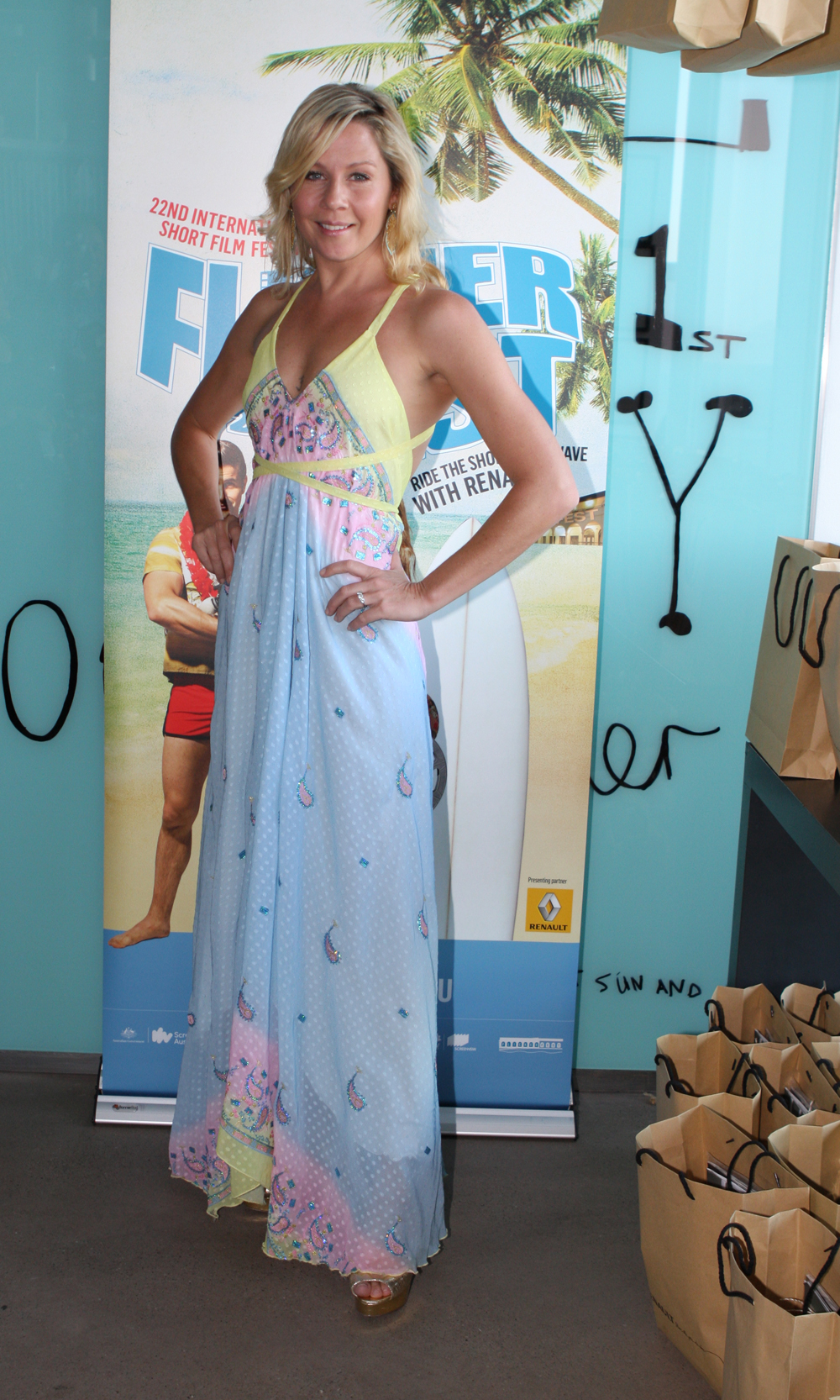
Gigi Edgley at Flickerfest launch night in the Bondi Icebergs Club.

The Flickerfest national tour was established in 1995. The tour consists of the central competitive programmes of the festival which include Best of Australian Shorts, Best of International Shorts and Shorts Laugh Comedy. The tour travels to rural, regional and metropolitan areas, to showcase the shorts. Flickerfest showcase short films at 50 venues throughout Australia. The Adelaide showing is at the Mercury Cinema.

The Flickerfest Tour has been publicised in regional and rural local newspapers. The Clarence Daily Examiner writes that the tour brings a "new arsenal of hilarious entertaining and thought-provoking micro cinema from across the country". The Newcastle Herald talks of local filmmaker's work being "brought to the big screen." The Illawarra Mercury writes on the local Kiama short film Buoy being selected to be shown in the Flickerfest Tour. The Wauchope Gazette reports the tour visiting Port Macquarie, the article primarily focuses upon the animation Lost Property Office and short film Miro, an Aboriginal Western film, describing the short to be "delightfully quirky and creative".

== Awards ==
=== International Competition Awards ===
A listing of the awards given for international competition:

- Flickerfest Award for Best International Short Film: Academy Accredited
- Special Jury Prize: Best International Short Film
- Yoram Gross award for Best International Short Animation: Academy Accredited
- SAE Creative Media Institute Award for Best Use of Digital Technology in a Short Film
- Flickerfest Award for Best Short Documentary Film: Academy Accredited
- Special Mention for Documentary
- European Union delegation in Australia Best EU Short Film

=== Australian Competition Awards ===
Australian-focused awards include the following:

- Virgin Australia Award for Best Australian Short Film: Academy Accredited
- Media Super Award for Best Screenplay in an Australian Short Film
- Canon Award for Best Direction in an Australian Short Film
- Yoram Gross Award for Best Australian Short Animation
- John Barry Award for Best Cinematography in an Australian Short Film
- Avid Award for Best Editing in an Australian Short Film
- Flickerfest Award for Best Performance in an Australian Short Film
- Rebel8 Award for Outstanding Emerging Female Director

== Previous winners ==
=== International Awards ===
Winners of the Flickerfest Award for Best International Short Film
Year	Film	Director	Nationality
1997	81	Stephen Burke	Ireland
1998	81	Stephen Burke	Ireland
2002	In Search of Mike	Andrew Lancaster	Australia
2003	Golden Gate (Palace II)	Kátia Lund, Fernando Meirelles	Brazil
2004	Malcolm	Baker Karim	Sweden
2005	The Scree	Paul McDermott, Justine Kerrigan	Australia
2007	Small Boxes	Rene Hernandez	USA
2008	Pop Foul	Moon Molson	USA
2009	Dennis	Mads Matthiesen	USA
2010	The Six Dollar Fifty Man	Mark Albiston, Louis Sutherland	New Zealand
2011	¿Donde está Kim Basinger?	Edouard Deluc	France
2012	Je pourrais être votre grand-mère	Bernard Tanguy	France
2013	Tiger Boy	Gabriele Mainetti	Italy
2014	Summer Vacation	Tal Granit, Sharon Maymon	Israel
2015	Oh Lucy	Atsuko Hirayanagi	Japan,USA
2016	Balcony	Toby Fell-Holden	UK
2017	Ungar (Cubs)	Nanna Kristín Magnúsdóttir	Iceland
2018	The World in Your Window	Zoe McIntosh	New Zealand
2019	Phone Duty	Lenar Kamalov	Russia

Winners of the Yoram Gross Award for the Best International Short Animation
Year	Film	Director	Nationality
2010	The Cat Piano	Eddie White, Ari Gibson	Australia
2011	The External World	David O'Reilly	Germany, Ireland
2012	It's Such a Beautiful Day	Don Hertzfeldt	USA
2013	Edmond Was a Donkey	Franck Dion	France, Canada
2014	Miniyamba	Luc Perez	Denmark
2015	Symphony No. 42	Réka Bucsi	Hungary
2016	He Who Has Two Souls / Celui Qui a Deux Âmes	Fabrice Luang-Vija	France
2017	Mr. Madila	Rory Waudby-Tolley	UK
2018	Sog	Jonatan Schwenk	Germany
2019	Flowing Through Wonder	Joana Lurie and Jean–Marc Bouzigues	France

Winners of the Flickerfest Best International Short Documentary Film
Year	Film	Director	Nationality
2010	Wagah	Supriyo Sen	Germany
2011	The Lucky Ones (Szczesciarze)	Tomasz Wolski	Poland
2012	Cutting Loose	Adrian McDowall, Finlay Napier	UK
2013	Crossed Out	Robert Duarte	Sweden
2014	SloMo	Josh Izenberg	USA
2015	Shipwreck	Morgan Knibbe	The Netherlands
2016	A Tale of Love, Madness and Death	Mijael Bustos	Chile
2017	Więzi (Close Ties)	Zofia Kowalewska	Poland
2018	Hello Salaam	Kim Brand	The Netherlands
2019	The Unconditional	Dave Adams	United States

=== Australian Awards ===
Winners of the Virgin Australia Award for Best Australian Short Film
Year	Film	Director
2010	Celestial Avenue	Colin and Cameron Cairnes
2011	The Lost Thing	Andrew Ruhemann, Shaun Tan
2012	The Palace	Anthony Maras
2013	Yardbird	Michael Spiccia
2014	The Kingdom of Doug	Victoria Thaine
2015	Grey Bull	Eddy Bell
2016	Slingshot	David Hansen
2017	Beast	Carl J Sorheim
2018	On Hold	Jake Nielsen
2019	Yulubidyi - Until the End	Nathan Mewett and Curtis Taylor

Winners of the Yoram Gross Award for Best Australian Short Animation
Year	Film	Director
2015	Bush Mechanics	Jason Japaljarri Woods, Jonathan Daw
2016	The Orchestra	Mikey Hill
2017	Fish with Legs	Dave Carter
2018	After All	Michael Cusack
2019	Della Mortika: Carousel Of Shame	Marisa Martin

Winners of the Canon Award for Best Direction in an Australian Short Film
Year	Film	Director
2015	Snowblind	Sean Kruck
2016	Red Rover	Brooke Goldfinch
2017	Dream Baby	Lucy Gaffy
2018	Second Best	Alyssa McClelland
2019	Tangles and Knots	Renée Marie Petropoulos

== Other notable films ==
Some other notable short films honoured in other awards categories include:

- A Black and White World (2005)
- The Last Dog in Rwanda (2006)
- Spider (2007)
- Hole in the Paper Sky (2008)
- The Six Dollar Fifty Man (2009)
- Bear (2011)
- Little Hands (2011)
- Julian (2012)
- Dumpy Goes to the Big Smoke (2012)

== Partners ==
Screen Australia is Flickerfest's major government partner, while other industry partners are the SAE Institute Australia: Creative Media Education, Create NSW, Sydney City of Film, Canon, European Union's Delegation to Australia and Virgin Entertainment. Touring partners in other states and territories are Screen Territory, Screen Queensland and Screen West. Award Partners include the SAE Institute, Virgin Australia, Canon, Yoram Gross Films, the EU Delegation to Australia, John Barry Sales, Avid, Media Super and Parker's Juicery. Flickerfest's media partners include TimeOut, Brag magazine, The Beast Magazine, 2ser 107.3, Concrete Playground, City Hub and Film Ink.

== Media reception ==
The Sydney Morning Herald conducted an interview with festival director Bronwyn Kidd in relation to gender parity. Kidd states "When I started out, female directors were a rare breed. Now hopefully we're encouraging a whole new generation to come into the industry."

Broadsheet, Sydney gave a synopsis of the festivals proceedings, stating "Australia's a great country of storytellers. The list of films on show [at the festival] has been narrowed down from over 2500 to 110.” The article also highlights the benefits of short film writing “[Short films are] so contemporary. A feature can take seven years from start to finish, [for] a short you can grab a camera and in two weeks you make a statement.”

The Brag wrote that "Flickerfest is unique in that the judging process doesn’t take the entrant’s budget into consideration – films are instead judged against the strength of the storytelling and the authenticity of the director’s voice."

== Gallery ==
Opening night photos from the 2013 event:

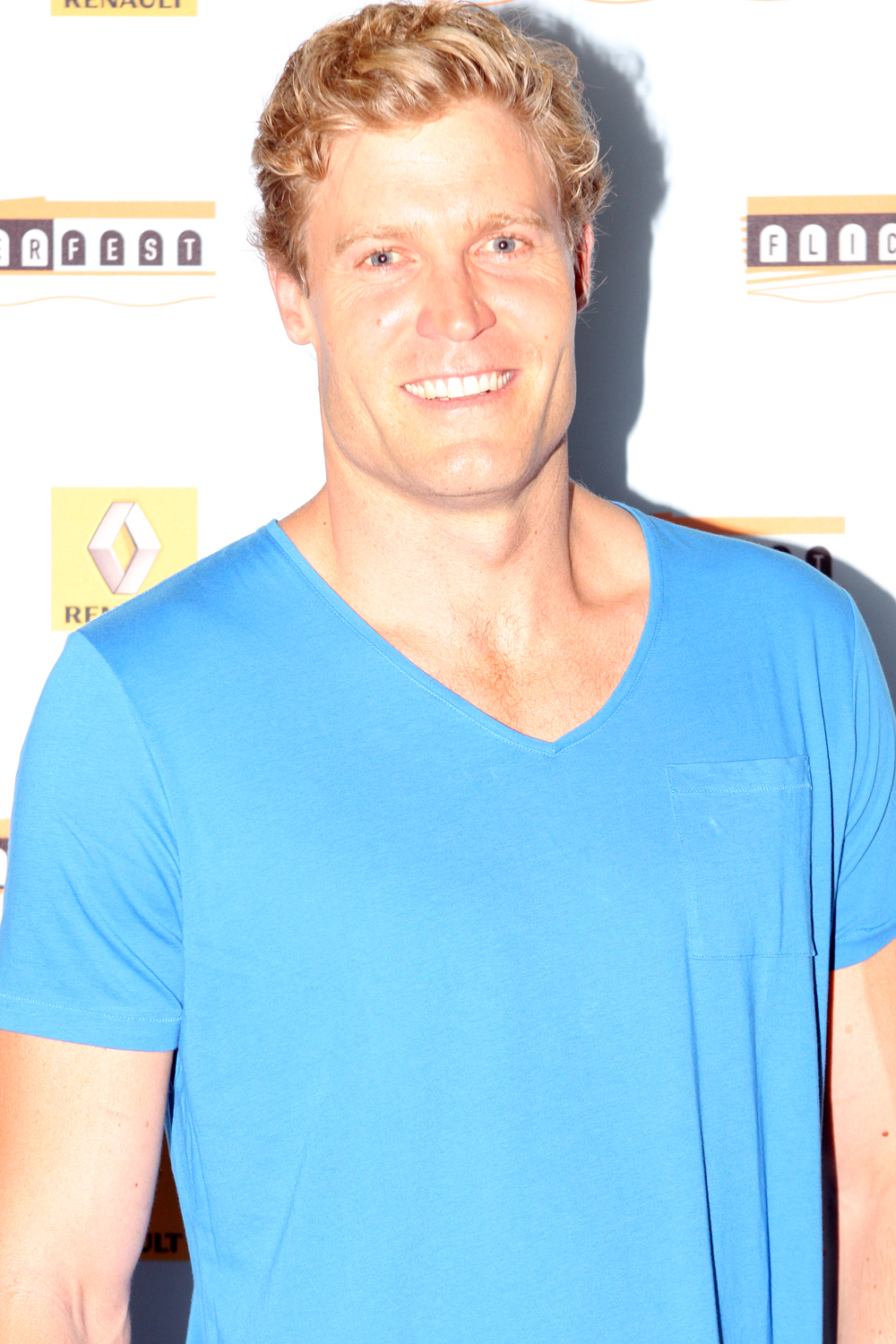
Chris Brown

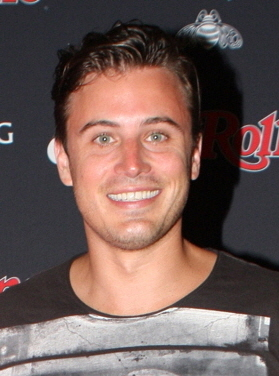
James Tobin

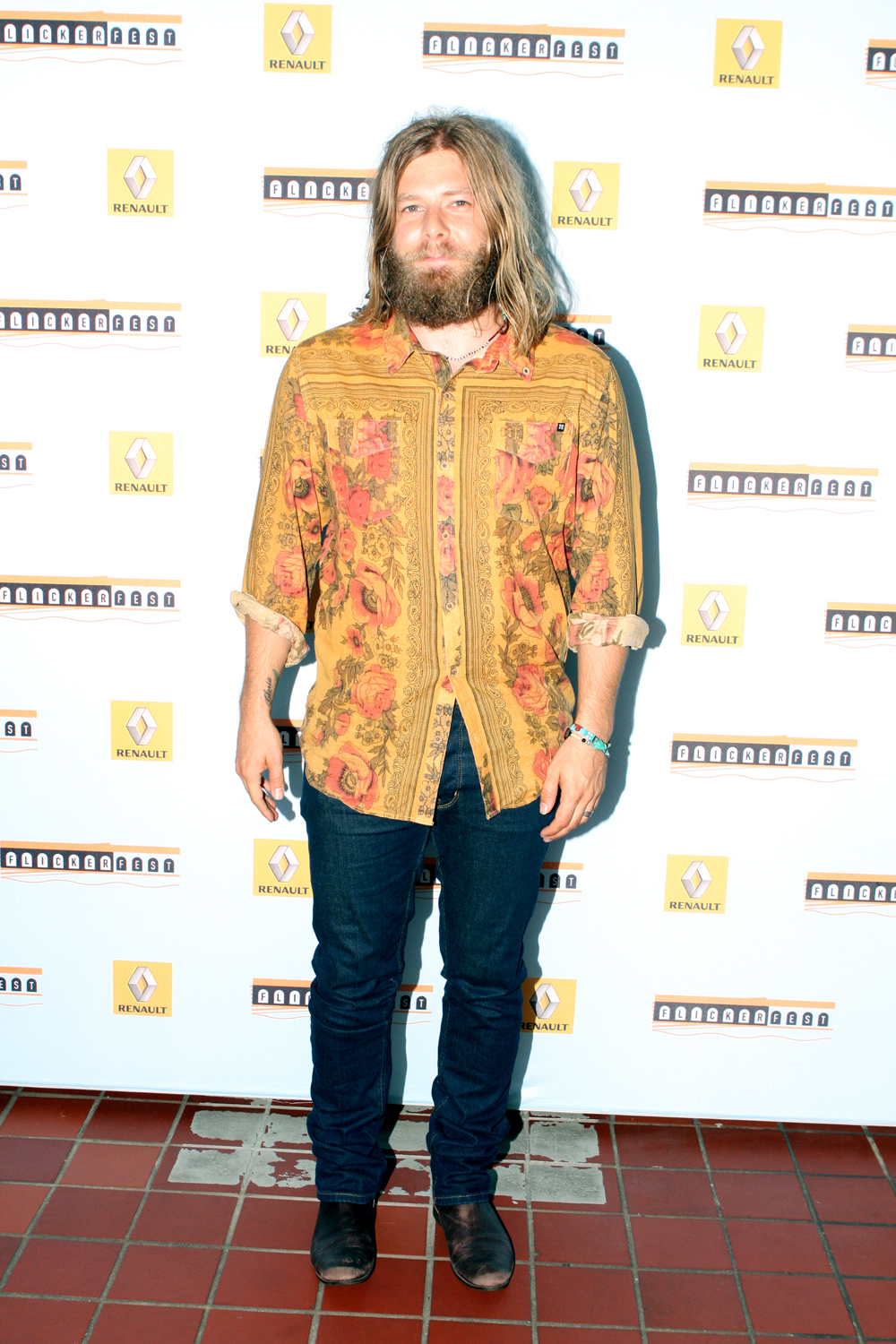
Wes Carr

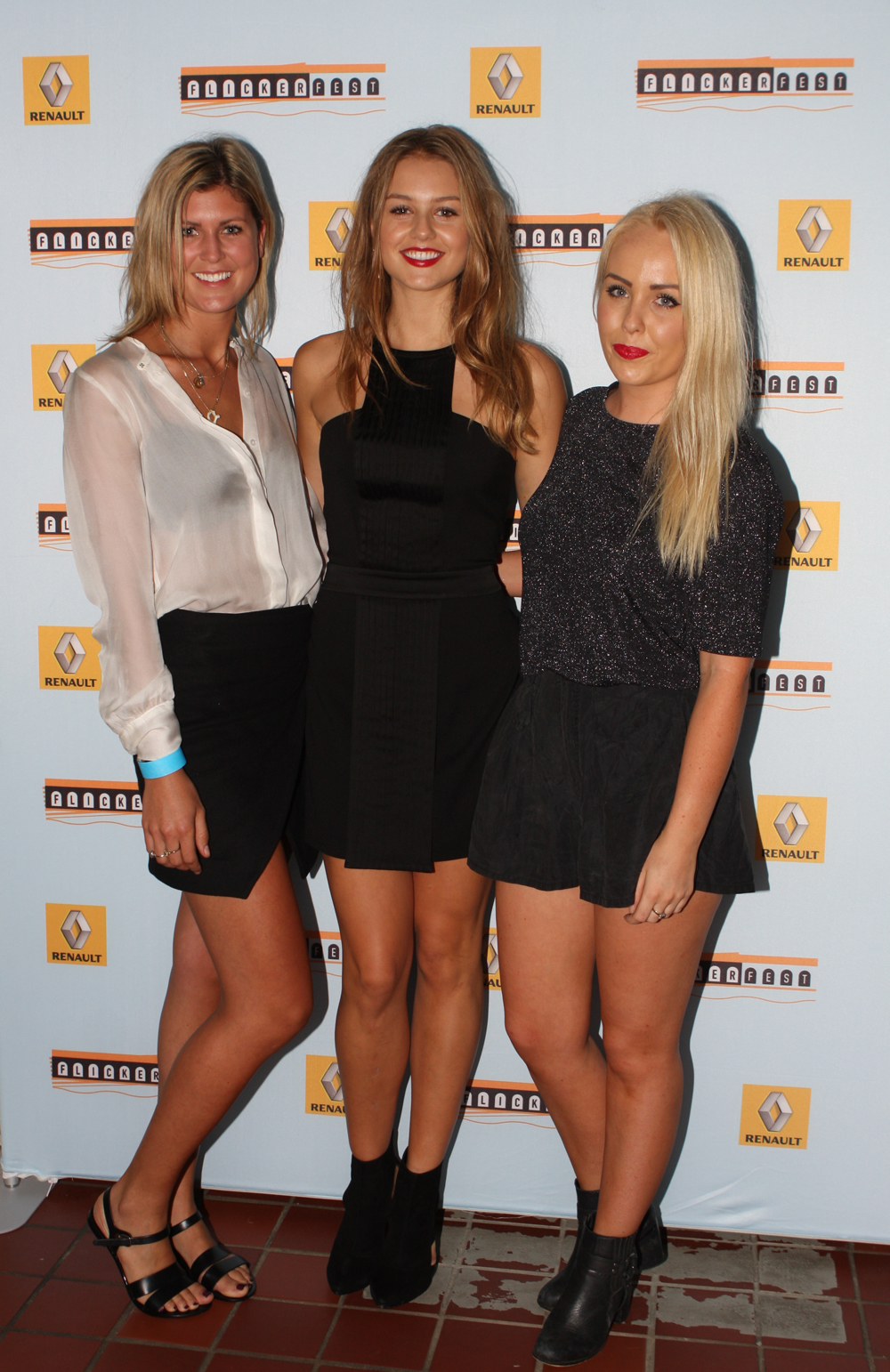
