= Paula Boock =

New Zealand writer

Paula Boock (born 1964) is a New Zealand writer and editor.

== Biography ==
Born in Dunedin, Boock is a member of a sporting family. She is the sister of four brothers, among them former New Zealand cricket representative Stephen Boock and sports journalist Richard Boock, and has herself represented her province of Otago at cricket. She studied at the University of Otago, after which she began working as an editor and publisher, co-founding Longacre Press in the city in 1994.

Boock's early writing consisted of plays and short stories, but she turned to novel-writing shortly after leaving university. Many of Boock's novels and television scripts are aimed primarily at the young adult market, and have been since her earliest writing. Her first novel, Out Walked Mel was published in 1991 and won the AIM Best First Book Award. Other awards followed for later books including Sasscat to Win (1993), Home Run (1996) and Dare, Truth, or Promise, the latter of which won the 1998 New Zealand Post Children's Book Awards, and was shortlisted in the United States for a 2000 Lambda Literary Award for LGBT-themed fiction.

Boock began writing for the screen in 1995 with an episode of drama series Cover Story. She began scriptwriting more in earnest in 2000, becoming one of four writers working on Gibson Group series The Strip. An episode of this series co-written by Boock and Kathryn Burnett won her a Best Drama Script Award at the 2003 New Zealand Television Awards. Boock's later television work includes scripts for The Insiders Guide to Happiness and its prequel, The Insider's Guide To Love, and editing and script consultancy work on both Bro'Town and Burying Brian.

In 2007, Boock and Donna Malane inaugurated Lippy Pictures, a production company which was responsible for the children's time-travel drama Time Trackers and tele-movie Until Proven Innocent. Time Trackers was nominated for best children's drama at the 2009 Australian Film Institute Awards, and Until Proven Innocent was a multiple award winner at New Zealand's 2009 Qantas Film and Television Awards. Later scripts co-authored by Boock for Lippy have included Bloodlines, another award-winning series, and Tangiwai - A Love Story, a dramatization of the 1953 Tangiwai train disaster.

Boock was the 1994 Writer in Residence at the Dunedin College of Education and in 1999, was named as the University of Otago's Burns Fellow. She was also named as 2009 Writer in Residence at Victoria University.
