= Shopping (2013 film) =

- Film poster
- Directed by: Mark Albiston; Louis Sutherland
- Written by: Mark Albiston; Louis Sutherland
- Produced by: Sarah Shaw; Anna McLeish
- Starring: Kevin Paulo; Julian Dennison; Jacek Koman; Alistair Browning; Laura Petersen; Maureen Fepuleai; Byron Coll; Matthias Luafutu
- Cinematography: Ginny Loane
- Edited by: Annie Collins
- Music by: Grayson Gilmour
- Production company: Warp Films Australia
- Distributed by: Madman Entertainment
- Release dates: January 2013 (Sundance); 30 May 2013 (NZ)
- Running time: 98 minutes
- Country: New Zealand
- Language: English
- Box office: US$82,756 (NZ)

Shopping is a 2013 New Zealand coming-of-age film written and directed by Mark Albiston and Louis Sutherland. Set in the Kāpiti Coast of Northern Wellington in 1981, it stars Kevin Paulo as a mixed race Samoan New Zealander who falls in with a group of shoplifters, led by an Eastern-European immigrant played by Jacek Koman. It premiered at the Sundance Film Festival in January 2013 and was released in New Zealand on 30 May 2013.

== Plot ==
In the Kāpiti Coast town of Paekākāriki in 1981, mixed-race teenager Willie and his younger brother, Solomon, spend increasing amounts of time away from their violent father and religious mother. Willie draws the appreciation of professional thief Bennie after unintentionally aiding one of his robberies. Drawn to the camaraderie of Bennie's gang, Willie must decide whether to follow them as they move on or stay behind to care for Solomon.

== Cast ==
- Kevin Paulo as Willie
- Julian Dennison as Solomon
- Jacek Koman as Bennie
- Alistair Browning as Terry, Willie's father
- Laura Petersen as Nicky, Bennie's daughter
- Maureen Fepuleai as Willie's mother
- Byron Coll as Lindsay
- Matthias Luafutu as Red

== Production ==
The film was inspired by real life events for writer-directors Albiston and Sutherland, who grew up together. It is their feature film debut, after having collaborated in short films. Shopping followed Boy, another New Zealand coming-of-age film about a boy of Polynesian descent, but Albiston said Boy was more of an inspiration in that it showed there was a market for such stories than creatively. Sutherland, who was working on the script at the time of Boy's release, did not watch it. Casting for Shopping was difficult; Sutherland said they toured many colleges to find their lead but eventually stumbled upon Paulo at a restaurant. Dennison was cast after extensive auditions, and Petersen, a drama student at the time, was discovered at a local college. During production, the two directors would split jobs, which they later described as a poor use of their collaborative skills. They said they were often told they were doing things improperly; at first, they found this unnerving but eventually found it exciting "because we know we're working unconventionally". The film was shot in Paekākāriki and across the Kāpiti Coast in May 2012.

== Release ==
Shopping premiered at the Sundance Film Festival in January 2013. Madman Entertainment released it in New Zealand on 30 May 2013, and it grossed $US82,756.

== Reception ==
The New Zealand Herald rated it 4/5 stars and called it "an affecting, memorable movie that is sure to figure in local best-of-year lists" despite minor issues in plotting. The Dominion Post rated it 4/5 stars and wrote that it "looks great and has great performances". The Manawatu Standard instead criticised the film's lack of plotting in favour of cinematography, rating it 1/5 stars. American trade publications Variety and The Hollywood Reporter, commenting on the film's uncompromising authenticity, both said that outsiders may find it different to understand or relate to. Variety called it "a rough-hewn but confident first feature" that takes too much influence from the filmmakers' background in short films, and The Hollywood Reporter wrote that the film "sacrifice[s] clarity and character involvement" for its intentionally rough aesthetic. Screen Daily similarly wrote that the film makes no concessions to outsiders but is "a labour of love" that film festival audiences will enjoy.

Awards
Organization	Award	Recipient	Result	Ref
Asia Pacific Screen Awards	Best Children's Feature Film	Sarah Shaw and Anna McLeish	Nominated	
Berlin International Film Festival	Grand Prix of the Generation 14+	Louis Sutherland and Mark Albiston	Won	
Pacific Meridian	Special Jury Award	Louis Sutherland and Mark Albiston	Won	
2013 Rialto Channel New Zealand Film Awards	Best Film	Anna McLeish and Sarah Shaw	Won	
2013 Rialto Channel New Zealand Film Awards	Best Director	Louis Sutherland and Mark Albiston	Won	
2013 Rialto Channel New Zealand Film Awards	Best Screenplay	Louis Sutherland and Mark Albiston	Won	
2013 Rialto Channel New Zealand Film Awards	Best Supporting Actor	Julian Dennison	Won	
2013 Rialto Channel New Zealand Film Awards	Best Supporting Actress	Laura Petersen	Won	
2013 Rialto Channel New Zealand Film Awards	Best Cinematography	Ginny Loane	Won	
2013 Rialto Channel New Zealand Film Awards	Best Poster Design	Geoff Francis	Won	
2013 Rialto Channel New Zealand Film Awards	Best Actor	Kevin Paulo	Nominated	
2013 Rialto Channel New Zealand Film Awards	Best Editor	Annie Collins	Nominated	
2013 Rialto Channel New Zealand Film Awards	Best Score	Grayson Gilmour	Nominated	
2013 Rialto Channel New Zealand Film Awards	Best Sound	Michael Hopkins, Ken Saville, John Mckay, Tim Chaproniere, Pete Smith	Nominated	
2013 Rialto Channel New Zealand Film Awards	Best Costume Design	Lucy McLay	Nominated	
2013 Rialto Channel New Zealand Film Awards	Best Production Design	Josh O'Neill	Nominated	
