= 2009 Qantas Film and Television Awards =

- Awarded for: Excellence in New Zealand film, television and television journalism
- Sponsored by: Qantas
- Date: 5 September 2009
- Location: Civic Theatre, Auckland
- Country: New Zealand
- Presented by: New Zealand Television Broadcasters Council and the Screen Directors Guild of New Zealand

Television/radio coverage
- Network: TV3

The 2009 Qantas Film and Television Awards were held on Saturday 5 September at the Civic Theatre in Auckland, New Zealand. The craft awards were presented in a separate awards lunch at the Civic Theatre Friday 4 September. Highlights from the main awards evening were broadcast on TV3.

== Nominees and winners ==
Awards were given in 60 categories, covering news and current affairs, general television, feature film and short film.

=== News and Current Affairs ===
Qantas Best News

- ONE News (TV One)
  - 3 News (TV3)
  - Tonight (TV One)

Best News or Current Affairs Presenter

- Kevin Milne, Fair Go (TV One)
  - Paul Henry, Breakfast (TV One)
  - Andrew Saville, ONE News (TV One)

Best News Reporting

- Amanda Gillies, 3 News, "Victoria Bush Fires" (TV3)
  - Guyon Espiner, ONE News, "Ele Peters" (TV One)
  - Duncan Garner, 3 News, "Secret Tapes" (TV3)

Best Current Affairs Reporting for a weekly programme or one off current affairs special

- John Hudson, Stephen Butler, Leander Scott-Donelan, Portia Mao, Sunday; "Bad Milk" (TV One)
  - Pete Cronshaw, Cara Darvill, 20/20; "Baby Business" (TV2)
  - Mike McRoberts, John Stephenson, 60 Minutes, "Bread Basket/Basket Case" (TV3)

Best Current Affairs Reporting for a daily programme

- Robyn Janes, Louisa Cleave, Corinne Ambler, Mike Hosking, Close Up, "Schools" (TV One)
  - Donna-Marie Lever, Close Up, "Family: The Gunman's Mum" (TV One)
  - Kate McCallum, Louisa Cleave, Michael Holland, Mike Valintine, Close Up, "Rest Home" (TV One)

Best Current Affairs Series

- Q+A, Episode 3 (TV One)
  - Native Affairs, "Hikoi" Episode 9 (Maori Television)
  - Sunday, Episode 14 (TV One)

Investigation of the Year

- Ian Sinclair, Dale Owens, Sunday, "Dr Disaster 2" (TV One)
  - John Hudson, Stephen Butler, Leander Scott-Donelan, Portia Mao, Sunday, "Bad Milk" (TV One)
  - Kate McCallum, Louisa Cleave, Michael Holland, Mike Valintine, Close Up, "Rest Home" (TV One)

=== News and Current Affairs (craft) ===
Best News Camera

- Jared Mason, ONE News, "US Election: McCain Campaign" (TV One)
  - James Marshall, Breakfast, "Skifield Prepares to Open" (TV One)
  - Cameron Williams, 3 News, "Anzac Day in Tinui and Chatham Islands" (TV3)

Best Current Affairs Camera

- Christopher Brown, 20/20, "The Amazing Race" (TV2)
  - Scott Behrnes, Campbell Live, "Merino" (TV3)
  - Patrice Hutchinson, Native Affairs, "Tini Whetu I Te Rangi" (Maori Television)

Best News Editing

- Kirsten Bolam, ONE News, "Ironwoman" (TV One)
  - Tony Clark, ONE News, "National Party candidates in South Auckland" (TV One)
  - Rebecca O'Sullivan, Sunrise/Nightline, "Jetboat", "Queenstown Artist and Retronude exhibit" (TV3)

Best Current Affairs Editing

- Will Kong, Sunday, "17 Hours" (TV One)
  - Paul Enticott, 60 Minutes, "No Fixed Abode" (TV3)
  - Paul Sparkes, Close Up, "Rock School" (TV One)

=== General Television ===
Best Drama Programme

- Until Proven Innocent, Paula Boock, Donna Malane; Lippy Pictures Ltd (TV One)
  - Outrageous Fortune, John Laing, South Pacific Pictures (TV3)
  - Piece of My Heart, Michele Fantl, MF Films Ltd (TV One)

Best Comedy Programme

- The Jaquie Brown Diaries, Jaquie Brown, Gerard Johnstone; Young, Gifted & Brown (TV3)
  - The Millen Baird Show, Rachel Gardner, Great Southern Television (TV3)
  - The Pretender, Rachel Gardner, Great Southern Television (TV One)

Best Maori Language Programme

- Ka Haku Au, Maramena Roderick, Ngahuia Wade; Maramena Ltd (Maori Television)
  - Ko Tawa, Jeni-Leigh Walker, Maori Television (Maori Television)
  - Maumahara, Hinewehi Mohi, Raukatauri Productions Ltd (Maori Television)

Best Children's/Youth Programme

- Play It Strange 2008, Rachel Jean, Isola Productions Ltd (C4)
  - Let's Get Inventin', Luke Nola, Television Spaceman Ltd (TV2)
  - Polyfest '09, Lisa Taouma, TVNZ (TV2)

Best Information/Lifestyle Programme

- Hunger for the Wild, Peter Young, Fisheye Films Ltd (TV One)
  - Fair Go, Graeme Muir, TVNZ (TV One)
  - What's Really in Our Food, Vincent Burke, Laurie Clarke; Top Shelf Productions Ltd (TV3)

Best Entertainment Programme

- Dancing with the Stars, Debra Kelleher, TVNZ (TV One)
  - Eating Media Lunch, Paul Casserly, Great Southern Television (TV2)
  - Who Wants To Be A Millionaire?, Tony Holden, Steve Gilbert; Great Southern Television (TV One)

Best Sports Broadcast

- International Netball Series 2008, Barbara Mitchell, TVNZ (TV One)
  - Heineken Open Tennis Finals, Steve Jamieson, TVNZ (TV One)
  - Powerbuilt Tools Motorsport, David Turner, TVNZ (TV One)

Best Event Coverage

- Vodafone New Zealand Music Awards, Arwen O'Connor, Satellite Media (C4)
  - C4 goes to Vodafone Homegrown, Satellite Media/C4 (C4)
  - ONE News Special: Election '08, Darryl Walker, TVNZ (TV One)

Best Observational Reality Series

- Rescue 1, Martin Cleave, Great Southern Television (TV2)
  - Piha Rescue, Eric Derks, South Pacific Video Productions Ltd (TV One)
  - The Zoo, Sharon Bennett for Greenstone Pictures, Greenstone Pictures (TV2)

Best Constructed Reality Series

- Missing Pieces, David Lomas, Eyeworks New Zealand (TV3)
  - New Zealand's Next Top Model, Anna Lynch, TV3 (TV3)
  - Sensing murder, David Harry Baldock, Geoff Husson, Cinna Smith; Ninox Television (TV2)

Best Performance by an Actress – General Television

- Emily Barclay, Piece of My Heart, MF Films Ltd (TV One)
  - Sarah Peirse, Aftershock, Gibson Group (TV3)
  - Annie Whittle, Piece of My Heart, MF Films Ltd (TV One)

Best Performance by a Supporting Actress – General Television

- Keisha Castle-Hughes, Piece of My Heart, MF Films Ltd (TV One)
  - Bronwyn Bradley, Go Girls, South Pacific Pictures (TV2)
  - Siobhan Marshall, Outrageous Fortune, South Pacific Pictures (TV3)

Best Performance by an Actor – General Television

- Cohen Holloway, Until Proven Innocent, Lippy Pictures Ltd (TV One)
  - Bob McLaren, The Pretender, Great Southern Television (TV One)
  - Antony Starr, Outrageous Fortune, South Pacific Pictures (TV3)

Best Performance by a Supporting Actor – General Television

- Peter Elliott, Until Proven Innocent, Lippy Pictures Ltd (TV One)
  - Owen Black, Shortland Street, South Pacific Pictures (TV2)
  - Andre King, The Pretender, Great Southern Television (TV One)

Best Presenter Entertainment/Factual Programme

- Jason Gunn, Dancing with the Stars, TVNZ (TV One)
  - Petra Bagust, What's Really in Our Food, Top Shelf Productions Ltd (TV3)
  - Te Radar, Off The Radar, JAM TV (TV One)

Best Script – Drama/Comedy Programme

- James Griffin, Rachel Lang, Outrageous Fortune, South Pacific Pictures (TV3)
  - Paula Boock, Donna Malane, Until Proven Innocent, Lippy Pictures Ltd (TV One)
  - Fiona Samuel, Piece of My Heart, MF Films Ltd (TV One)

Best Director – Drama/Comedy Programme

- Brendon Donovan, Aftershock, Gibson Group (TV3)
  - Peter Burger, Until Proven Innocent, Lippy Pictures Ltd (TV One)
  - Fiona Samuel, Piece of My Heart, MF Films Ltd (TV One)

Best Director – Factual/Entertainment Programme

- Paul Casserly, Eating Media Lunch, Great Southern Television (TV2)
  - Jane Andrew, Off The Radar, JAM TV (TV One)
  - Paul Murphy, Sensing murder, Ninox Television (TV2)

=== General Television (craft) ===
Best Multi Camera Direction in General Television

- Steve Jamieson, IRB World Sevens Series Wellington, TVNZ (TV One)
  - Mitchell Hawkes, Vodafone NZ Music Awards, Satellite Media (C4)
  - Mark Owers, Dancing with the Stars, TVNZ (TV One)

Best Camera Work – Drama/Comedy Programme

- David Paul, Until Proven Innocent, Lippy Pictures Ltd (TV One)
  - Simon Baumfield, Aftershock, Gibson Group (TV3)
  - Martin Smith, Outrageous Fortune, South Pacific Pictures (TV3)

Best Editing – Drama/Comedy Programme

- Paul Sutorius, Until Proven Innocent, Lippy Pictures Ltd (TV One)
  - Margot Francis, Piece of My Heart, MF Films Ltd (TV One)
  - Bryan Shaw, Outrageous Fortune, South Pacific Pictures (TV3)

Best Original Music in General Television

- David Ironside, Lost in Libya, Pacific Screen (TV One)
  - Jonathan Bree, Go Girls, South Pacific Pictures (TV2)
  - Conrad Wedde, Luke Buda, Until Proven Innocent, Lippy Pictures Ltd (TV One)

Best Sound Design in General Television

- Phil Burton, Don Paulin, Chris Hiles, Aftershock, Gibson Group (TV3)
  - Tom Miskin, Steve Finnigan, The Amazing Extraordinary Friends, Images & Sound (TV2)
  - Carl Smith, Steve Finnigan, Outrageous Fortune, Images & Sound (TV3)

Best Production Design in General Television

- Tracey Collins, Piece of My Heart, MF Films Ltd (TV One)
  - Flux Animation Studios, Buzzy Bee And Friends, Lion Rock Ventures Ltd (TV2)
  - John Harding, Until Proven Innocent, Lippy Pictures Ltd (TV One)

Best Contribution to Design in General Television

- Claire Palmer, Dancing with the Stars, TVNZ (TV One)
  - Aftershock Effects Team, Aftershock, Gibson Group (TV3)
  - Lesley Burkes-Harding, Until Proven Innocent, Lippy Pictures Ltd (TV One)

=== Documentary ===
Best Popular Documentary

- A Good Way To Die?, Octopus Pictures (TV3)
  - Life, Death and a Lung Transplant, Rachel Jean, Isola Productions Ltd (TV3)
  - Mika Haka Kids, Mika X, Patangaroa Entertainment Ltd (Maori Television)

Best Arts/Festival/Feature Documentary

- The Art Star and the Sudanese Twins, Pietra Brettkelly
  - Assume Nothing, Kirsty MacDonald, Girl on a Bike Films
  - Kapiti Art Project, Summer Agnew, Curious Film (TVNZ6)

=== Documentary (craft) ===
Best Director – Documentary

  - Pietra Brettkelly, The Art Star and the Sudanese Twins
  - Summer Agnew, Kapiti Art Project, Curious Film (TVNZ6)|
  - Gerard Smyth, Barefoot Cinema: The Life And Art Of Cinematographer Alun Bollinger, Frank Film (TV One)

Best Camerawork – Documentary/Factual Programme

  - Tony Barnes, Obi Kenobi, Million Dollar Catch, Great Southern Television (TV3)
  - Jacob Bryant, The Art Star And The Sudanese Twins
  - Peter Young, Hunger For The Wild, Fisheye Films Ltd (TV One)

Best Editing – Documentary/Factual Programme

  - Irena Dol, The Art Star And The Sudanese Twins
  - Sandor Lau, Squeegee Bandit, Sandor Lau Creations
  - Tim Woodhouse, TOKI Does New York, Octopus Pictures (TV One)

=== Feature Film ===
Best Feature Film – budget over $1 million

- Dean Spanley, Matthew Metcalfe, Alan Harris; General Film Corporation
  - Apron Strings, Rachel Gardner, Great Southern Television
  - Show of Hands, Angela Littlejohn, Great Southern Television

Best Feature Film – budget under $1 million

- The Topp Twins: Untouchable Girls, Arani Cuthbert, Diva Productions
  - I'm Not Harry Jenson, Tom Hern, Six String Pictures
  - The Map Reader, John Davies, Arkles Entertainment

Best Director in a Film Feature (budget under and over $1 million)

- Toa Fraser, Dean Spanley, General Film Corporation
  - Anthony McCarten, Show of Hands, Great Southern Television
  - Sima Urale, Apron Strings, Great Southern Television

Best Lead Actor in a Feature Film

- Scott Wills, Apron Strings, Great Southern Television
  - Joel Edgerton, Separation City, Separation City Productions
  - Sam Neill, Dean Spanley, General Film Corporation

Best Lead Actress in a Feature Film

- Jennifer Ludlam, Apron Strings, Great Southern Television
  - Danielle Cormack, Separation City, Separation City Productions
  - Melanie Lynskey, Show of Hands, Great Southern Television

Best Supporting Actor in a Feature Film

- Peter O'Toole, Dean Spanley, General Film Corporation
  - Les Hill, Separation City, Separation City Productions
  - Cameron Rhodes, I'm Not Harry Jenson, Six String Pictures

Best Supporting Actress in a Feature Film

- Bonnie Soper, The Map Reader, Arkles Entertainment
  - Nancy Brunning, The Strength of Water, Filmwork Ltd
  - Michelle Langstone, Separation City, Separation City Productions

Best Screenplay for a Feature Film

- Alan Sharp, Dean Spanley, General Film Corporation
  - Briar Grace-Smith, The Strength of Water, Filmwork Ltd
  - Shuchi Kothari, Dianne Taylor, Apron Strings, Great Southern Television

=== Feature Film (craft) ===
Best Cinematography in a Feature Film

- Rewa Harre, Apron Strings, Great Southern Television
  - Bogumil Godfrejow, The Strength of Water, Filmwork Ltd
  - Leon Narbey, Dean Spanley, General Film Corporation

Best Editing in a Feature Film

  - Harold Brodie, The Map Reader, Arkles Entertainment
  - Eric de Beus, Apron Strings, Great Southern Television
- Chris Plummer, Dean Spanley, General Film Corporation

Best Original Music in a Feature Film

- Jools Topp, Lynda Topp, The Topp Twins: Untouchable Girls, Diva Productions
  - Don McGlashan, Dean Spanley, General Film Corporation
  - Samuel Flynn Scott, Luke Buda, Separation City, Separation City Productions

Best Sound Design in a Feature Film

- Dave Whitehead, The Strength of Water, Filmwork Ltd
  - Chris Burt, David Long, The Topp Twins: Untouchable Girls, Diva Productions
  - Paul Cotterell, Dean Spanley, General Film Corporation

Best Production Design in a Feature Film

- Johnny Hawkins, Apron Strings, Great Southern Television
  - Rick Kofoed, The Strength of Water, Filmwork Ltd
  - Andrew McAlpine, Dean Spanley, General Film Corporation

Best Costume Design in a Feature Film

- Odile Dicks-Mireaux, Dean Spanley, General Film Corporation
  - Kirsty Cameron, The Strength of Water, Filmwork Ltd

Best Make-Up Design in a Feature Film

- Marese Langan, Dean Spanley, General Film Corporation
  - Deb Watson, The Strength of Water, Filmwork Ltd

=== Short film ===
Best Short Film

- Mark Albiston, Louis Sutherland, The Six Dollar Fifty Man, Sticky Pictures Limited
  - James Cunningham, Poppy, Supercollider Ltd
  - Grant Major, Undergrowth, Octopus Pictures

Best Performance in a Short Film

- Oscar Vandy-Connor, The Six Dollar Fifty Man, Sticky Pictures Limited
  - Ian Hughes, Undergrowth, Octopus Pictures
  - Cameron Rhodes, Brave Donkey, Robber's Dog Films

=== Short Film (craft) ===
Best Screenplay for a Short Film

- Mark Albiston, Louis Sutherland, The Six Dollar Fifty Man, Sticky Pictures Limited
  - David Coyle, Poppy, Supercollider Ltd
  - Peter Force, Adam Strange, Aphrodite's Farm, JoyRide Films Ltd

Outstanding Technical Contribution to a Short Film

- James Cunningham, Poppy, Supercollider Ltd
  - Cushla Dillon, Brave Donkey, Robber's Dog Films
  - Ginny Loane, Brave Donkey, Robber's Dog Films
