= The Map Reader =

2008 New Zealand feature film

- Directed by: Harold Brodie
- Written by: Harold Brodie
- Produced by: John Davies
- Starring: Rebecca Gibney; Jordan Selwyn; Mikaila Hutchinson; Bonnie Soper
- Cinematography: Renaud Maire
- Edited by: Harold Brodie
- Music by: Paul Ubana Jones
- Production company: Arkles Entertainment
- Distributed by: Beamafilm
- Release date: 2008
- Running time: 90 minutes
- Country: New Zealand
- Language: English

The Map Reader is a New Zealand drama film, directed, written and edited by Harold Brodie and released in 2008. It was produced by John Davies for Arkles Entertainment and distributed by Beamafilm. The action is set in Kaipara Harbour and Rodney District, North Island. It is a coming-of-age story, which follows Michael (Jordan Selwyn), a socially awkward teenager. He lives with his mother Amelia (Rebecca Gibney), a heavy drinking single parent. Michael's hobby is studying maps, while his love interests are blind woman Mary (Bonnie Soper) and his classmate Alison (Mikaila Hutchinson). Soper won Best Supporting Actress in a Feature Film at the 2009 New Zealand film and television awards. Producer John Davies was nominated for Best Feature Film – budget under $1 million and Brodie was nominated for Best Editing in a Feature Film at the same ceremony.

== Plot ==
Michael is a socially awkward senior secondary student in a small town in New Zealand. From a young age he has a passion for maps. His mother Amelia was deserted by his father, an airline pilot, when he was a baby. Amelia has a drinking problem: alternately pushing Michael away and smothering him. Michael hangs out with Carlo and Simon, who perv at a blind woman, Mary as she showers. When Amelia's friend Evelyn visits she brings her daughter Mary. Mary flirts with Michael and later seduces him despite knowing of the local boys' perving. She intends leaving town for Auckland to study law. Michael begins to include classmate Alison in his activities, including inviting her home. He learns that Alison's father is abusive and tries to protect her. Alison knocks her father out and gives Michael money. Michael decides to look for his absent father and leaves town after the end of the school year.

== Cast ==
- Rebecca Gibney as Amelia Rosemont: Michael's mother, deserted by her husband (airline pilot), heavy drinker, local shop attendant
- Jordan Selwyn as Michael Rosemont: 16-year-old secondary school student, Amelia's son, studies maps as a hobby
- Mikaila Hutchinson as Alison: secondary school student, Michael's classmate
- Bonnie Soper as Mary Parks: 20-year-old blind woman, aspiring law student
- Rachel Nash as Evelyn Parks: Amelia's recently returned former school friend, Mary's mother
- Sam Hall as Simon Plat: secondary school student, Michael's classmate, voyeur of Mary
- Russell Wills as Carlo: secondary school student, Michael's classmate, voyeur of Mary
- Mark Tronson as Kevin: Simon's older cousin
- Braydon Kearns as Young Michael: 6-year-old boy, begins map collecting hobby
- Michael Hurst as Alison's father: emotionally and physically abusive to Alison

== Reception ==
Deborah Robinson of Australian Women Online praised Gibney's portrayal of Amelia, "[she] elicits much empathy for the character and of course, the experienced actress steals just about every scene she’s in". AllMovie's assessor rated it at one-out-of-five stars. Flicks reviewer Andreas Heinemann gave it four-out-of-five, "[it] punches above its weight... [and] is driven by the great work of an impressive cast." Dan Slevin of Funerals & Snakes observed, "[Brodie] is hampered by some weak performances from [most of his cast] and a lack of a considered visual style... [his] more successful [choice is] a distinctive soundtrack from bluesman [Jones]."
