= The Eye of the Storm (2009 film) =

2009 film

- Film poster
- Portuguese: No meu lugar
- Directed by: Eduardo Valente
- Written by: Eduardo Valente
- Produced by: Mauricio Andrade Ramos; Walter Salles
- Starring: Marcio Vito
- Cinematography: Breno Cunha; Mauro Pinheiro Jr.
- Edited by: Quito Ribeiro
- Release dates: 20 May 2009 (Cannes); 13 November 2009 (Brazil)
- Running time: 113 minutes
- Country: Brazil
- Language: Portuguese

The Eye of the Storm (Portuguese: No meu lugar) is a 2009 Brazilian drama film directed by Eduardo Valente. It was given a special screening at the 2009 Cannes Film Festival.

== Cast ==
- Marcio Vito as José Maria
- Dedina Bernardelli as Elisa
- Licurgo Spinola as Fernando
- Luca De Castro as Jaime
- Malu Rocha as Dona Fátima
- Luciana Bezerra as Sandra
- Raphael Sil as Beto
