= Irene (2009 film) =

2009 film

- Directed by: Alain Cavalier
- Release date: May 2009
- Running time: 83 minutes
- Country: France
- Language: French

Irene (French: Irène) is a 2009 French drama film directed by Alain Cavalier. It competed in the Un Certain Regard section at the 2009 Cannes Film Festival.
