= Jordan Selwyn =

New Zealand film and stage actor

Jordan Selwyn is a New Zealand film and stage actor. Selwyn is best known for his role in New Zealand film The Map Reader (2008) starring alongside Rebecca Gibney. Selwyn, nephew of actor Don Selwyn, was 17 when filming commenced on The Map Reader. Selwyn grew up on Auckland's North Shore, and attended Kristin School.
