= Mark Albiston =

New Zealand film, television and advertising director

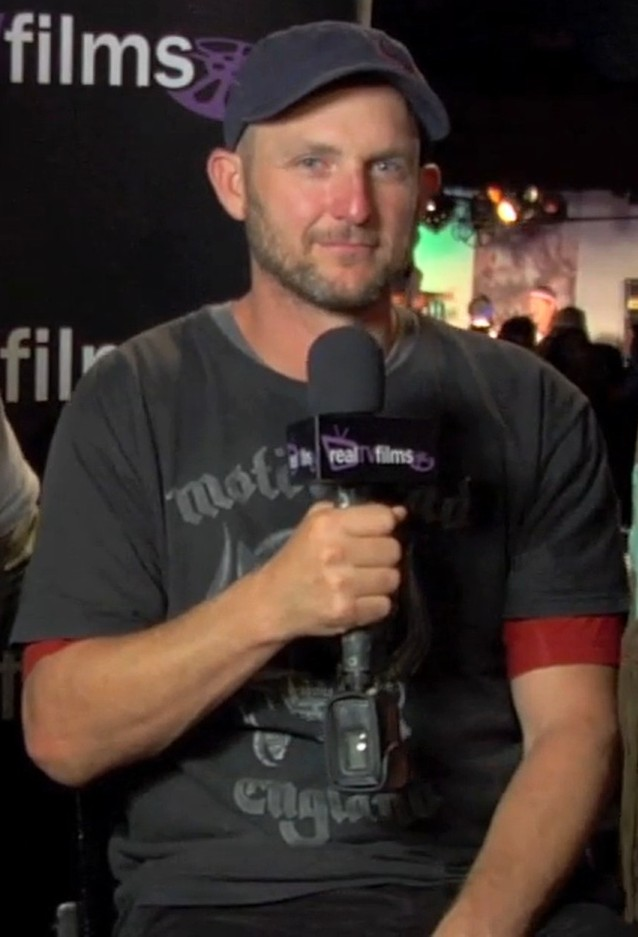
- Albiston in 2013
- Born: 19 March 1972 (age 53); Wellington, New Zealand
- Occupations: Director, screenwriter
- Years active: 1994–present

Mark Albiston (born 19 March 1972) is a New Zealand film, television and advertising director. He graduated from University of Canterbury in Christchurch in 1992 with a degree in Fine Arts.

== Career ==
In 2000, Albiston started the production company Sticky Pictures. The company produced award-winning content across a wide range of genres including documentary, short films, music videos, and commercials. These projects offered Albiston the opportunity to refine his directing talent from a variety of angles writing, editing and shooting on various projects. Albiston won a number of Documentary and factual TV awards including best arts documentary for The Magical World of Misery and best factual entertainment TV show for The Living Room.

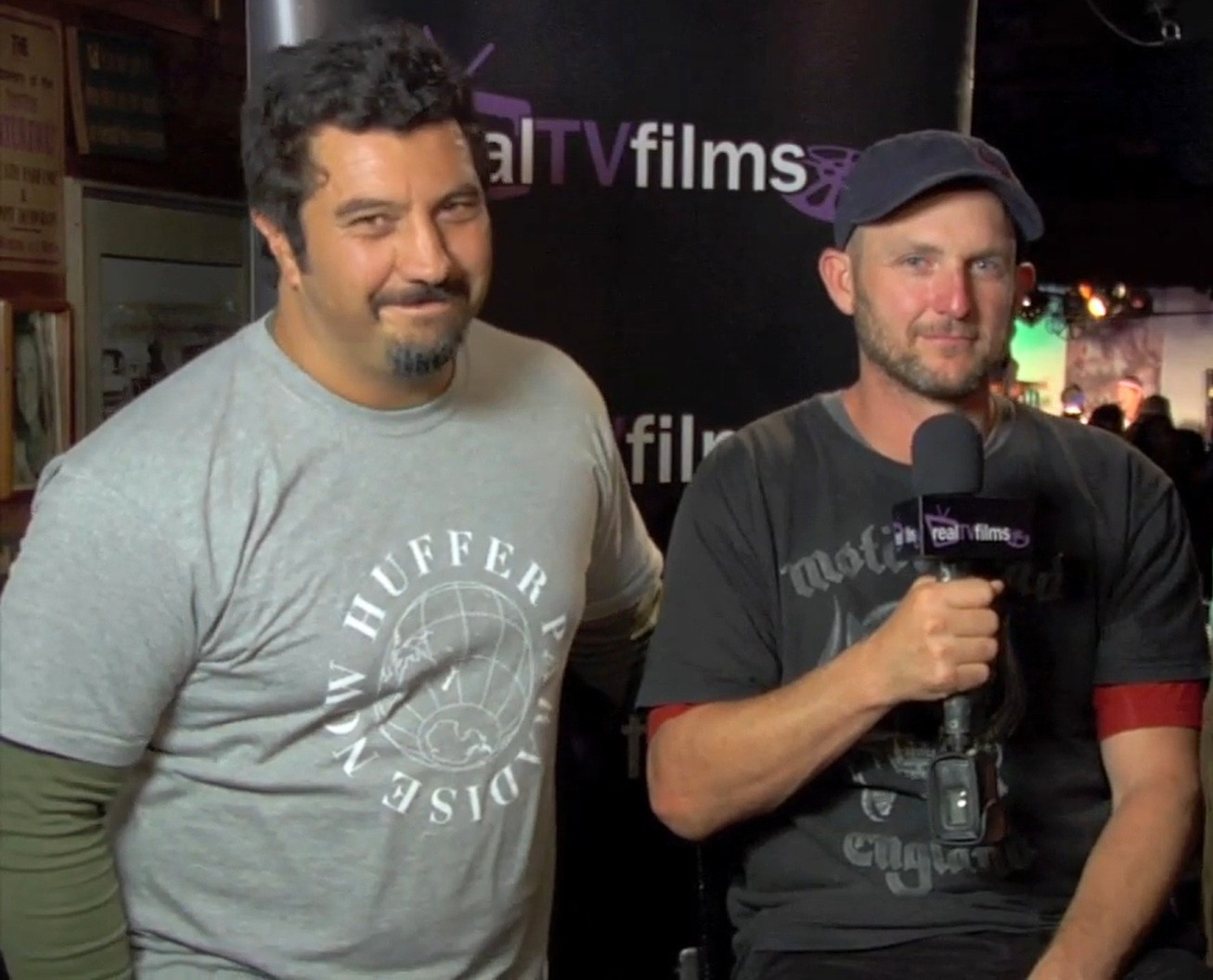
Louis Sutherland (left) with Albiston in 2013

In 2007, Albiston received recognition in the Short Film Section at the Cannes Film Festival for his short film Run. Created in collaboration with writer/actor Louis Sutherland, the film won prizes at a number of other festivals.

Albiston follow-up short film The Six Dollar Fifty Man. won the same Jury award at the 2009 Cannes Film Festival. Albiston was the first director to win twice in that category at Cannes. The film was a break-out hit on the festival circuit; its tally included winning the award for best international short at The Sundance Film Festival, a special mention in its section at Berlin, scooping three awards at the 2009 Qantas Film and Television Awards – including Best Short – and top prize at the 2010 Flickerfest festival in Australia. The Six Dollar Fifty Man made the 10-strong long-list for the Academy Awards, ultimately missing out on the final five.

At the 2013 Sundance Film Festival, Albiston premiered Shopping, his feature film co-directorial debut. Also created with Louis Sutherland, the film earned several awards including a Grand Prix at the Berlin International Film Festival, and seven New Zealand Film Awards. including Best Film, Best Screenplay, and Best Director.

In 2019, Albiston directed Billy and the Kids, a 40-minute documentary that screened as part of the NZ International Film Festival. The film is about troubled kids that have been caught by the rock-iron mitts of boxing coach Billy Graham. Billy grew up rough but was saved by his boxing coach Dick Dunn. Now he has five boxing academies that are saving kids just like him. Billy and the Kids tells the story of an overstayer from Nauru, an extreme anxiety sufferer, an Afghan refugee, a young run away and truant teens who've all found a safe haven at Billy's gym.

Albiston is currently developing his first solo-directed feature film together with New Zealand writer Paul Stanley Ward called Cat Burglar.

Albiston has continued to work independently as a commercials director, winning awards at every major advertising awards show around the globe.

== Filmmaking style ==
Albiston has gained an international following by crafting a body of work that focuses on character and emotion, stripping away pretense to create authentic and raw emotional performances.
