= Piece of My Heart (film) =

- Written by: Fiona Samuel
- Directed by: Fiona Samuel
- Starring: Annie Whittle; Rena Owen; Emily Barclay; Keisha Castle-Hughes; John Bach; Michelle Blundell
- Theme music composer: Don McGlashan; Edmund McWilliams
- Country of origin: New Zealand
- Original language: English

Production
- Producers: Liz Adams; Michele Fantl
- Cinematography: Dave Cameron
- Editor: Margot Francis
- Running time: 93 minutes
- Production companies: M.F films; TVNZ

Original release
- Release: 5 April 2009

Piece of My Heart is a 2009 New Zealand television film starring Keisha Castle-Hughes, Annie Whittle, Emily Barclay, and Rena Owen. It is based on Renee's 1995 novel Does This Make Sense to You?, which focuses on the experiences of unwed teenage mothers in 1960s New Zealand who experienced stigmatisation and the adoption of their babies.

== Plot summary ==
In the present, an adult Flora Thornley receives a rejection letter from her lost daughter, whom she was coerced into giving up for adoption while residing at a home for unwed mothers in 1960s New Zealand. Flora lives in Hamilton with her husband and two sons who are unaware of her past as a teenage mother. Without informing her family, Flora hitchhikes to Dunedin where she reunites with Kat, whom she befriended at the unwed mothers' home. Kat has become a nurse and has taken in a pregnant teenager she found begging in a supermarket carpark.

In the past, a teenage Flora becomes pregnant after having sexual intercourse with her university-age boyfriend. Since premarital sex and abortion are frowned upon in 1960s New Zealand, Flora's parents send her to a home for unwed mothers. Flora and the other young mothers are mistreated and humiliated by the matron, who forces them to work long hours in the home's laundry business. During her time there, Flora befriends a teenage Kat and a younger 13 year old girl, who was impregnated by her father.

After the 13 year old girl commits suicide, the matron promises Flora and Kat that they will be able to parent their infant daughter and son if they do not report their friend's death to the Police. However, the matron reneges on her promise and their children are separated from them in a closed adoption. Enraged, Kat attacks the matron and is sedated as punishment.

Returning to the present, the film deals with Flora's husband confronting her about her past while Kat helps the pregnant teenager as a means of coming to terms with her past. Flora also learns that the father of her child died in an untimely car accident at the age of 21.

== Production ==
=== Development and writing ===
Piece of My Heart was written and directed by Fiona Samuel based on Renee Taylor's 1995 novel Does This Make Sense to You?. The novel struck a chord with Samuel, who was inspired by meeting her adopted brother in 1968. The film took ten years to develop and had a budget of NZ$1.5 million.

=== Casting ===
Christina Asher was responsible for casting. Key cast members included Annie Whittle as Flora Thornley, Emily Barclay as a younger Flora, Rena Owen as Kat and Keisha Castle-Hughes as a younger Kat. Whittle had previously collaborated with Samuel while Owen said that she was drawn to the project by the script. Castle-Hughes said she was drawn to the script by her own experiences as a pregnant teenage mother. To prepare the cast members for their roles, Fantl arranged for them to meet with her woman who had been through a similar experiences to their characters. Taylor also provided the cast members with letters from former home residents.

Supporting cast members included John Bach as Mike, Michelle Blundell as Elaine, Daniel Cleary as a South Island truck driver, Sophie Henderson as Margaret, Dan Musgrove as Rupert and Morgana O'Reilly as June Watt.

=== Filming ===
Piece of My Heart was filmed in late 2008 in Auckland and Dunedin. It was produced by Michele Fantl of MF Films. Fantl said that he could relate to the film due to his experiences as an adopted child whose birth parents had refused to make contact. Liz Adams served as line producer while Dave Cameron served as cinematographer and Claire Burlinson as colourist. Kirsty Cameron served as the film's costume designer while Tracey Collins served as production designer and Anne Cottle as production coordinator.

Robyn Grace served as first assistant director, Lance Guthrie as assistant camera operator and Emily Harris as art director. Adam Martin served as sound recordist.

=== Post-production ===
Peter Barrett served as post-production supervisor while Steve Finnigan served as post-production supervisor for sound. Don McGlashan and Edmund McWilliams served as composers. Margot Francis served as editor while Beau Rebel served as assistant editor.

== Reception ==
=== Critical reception ===
Michele Hewitson of The New Zealand Herald gave a positive review of Piece of My Heart, describing it as "at heart, a beautifully produced, moving piece of drama,..." Hewitson also praised the performances of the four main cast members Keisha Castle Hughes, Emily Barclay, Rena Owen and Annie Whittle. Hewitson was however critical of some plot events including an adult Flora hitchhiking from her hometown of Hamilton to Dunedin, and the relationship dynamics between Flora, her teenage boyfriend and her lost daughter.

=== Awards ===
- 2009 Qantas Film and Television Awards – Best Performance by an Actress - General Television: Emily Barclay – Won
- 2009 Qantas Film and Television Awards — Best Performance by a Supporting Actress - General Television: Keisha Castle-Hughes — Won
- 2009 Qantas Film and Television Awards — Best Production Design - General Television: Tracey Collins – Won
- 2009 Qantas Film and Television Awards — Best Drama Programme - Television, Best Script and Director — Drama/Comedy Progamme: Fiona Samuel – Nominated
- 2009 Qantas Film and Television Awards — Best Performance by an Actress - General Television: Annie Whittle — Nominated
- 2009 Qantas Film and Television Awards — Best Editing - Drama/Comedy Programme: Margot Francis — Nominated
