= Black Horse Memories =

- Directed by: Shahram Alidi
- Screenplay by: Shahram Alidi
- Produced by: Shahram Alidi
- Starring: Berrak Tüzünataç; Diman Zandi; Şenay Aydın; Vildan Atasever; Aziz Çapkurt; Bilal Bulut; Maryam Bobani; Tara Jaff; Şevval Sam
- Edited by: Hayedeh Safiyari
- Music by: Kayhan Kalhor
- Release date: October 2015 (Busan International Film Festival)
- Running time: 90 minutes
- Countries: Iran; Turkey
- Languages: Kurdish; Turkish

Black Horse Memories (Persian: خاطرات اسب سیاه, Turkish: Kara At Hatıraları, Kurdish: Bîranîna hespa res), is a 2015 Iranian-Turkish drama film directed by Shahram Alidi. It is the second film by Alidi.

== Plot ==
A black horse plunges to her memories with Aaseke. They have been close friends since their childhood. Now, Aaseke is martyred during her mission with her friends. These young boy-and-girl fighters endeavor to teach Kurdish language in Kurdistan villages in confrontation with central government. Teaching and even talking Kurdish have been banned in Turkey for many years. Her comrades are trying to reveal the place of her corpse was hidden, and then they are carrying out her will before burial ceremony. She has some points in her will list. The important one is meeting again her black horse. They start seeking to find the black horse.

== Cast ==
- Berrak Tüzünataç as Zaria
- Diman Zandi as Aseke
- Şenay Aydın as Anahita
- Vildan Atasever as Vian
- Aziz Çapkurt as Elias
- Bilal Bulut as Khezr
- Maryam Bobani as Aseke's Mother
- Tara Jaff as Shahmaran
- Şevval Sam as Nurse

== Accolades ==
- 20th Busan International Film Festival/ South Korea. October 1–10, 2015
- 2nd Brisbane Asia Pacific Film Festival/ Australia. November 19–29, 2015
- 9th Asia Pacific Screen Awards, Brisbane/ Australia. November 26, 2015
- 15th !f Istanbul International Independent Film Festival, Turkey, February 18–28, 2016. "!f Inspired Competition" section
- 4th Duhok International Film Festival, Kurdistan Region, Iraq. September 9–16, 2016
- Slemani International Film Festival, Kurdistan Region, Iraq. October 1–4, 2016 "Competition"
- Winner of Special Jury Prize, 9th Kurdish Filmdays "Sercavan" Vienna, Austria. November 24–27, 2016
