= Shahram Alidi =

Iranian film director, screenwriter and film producer

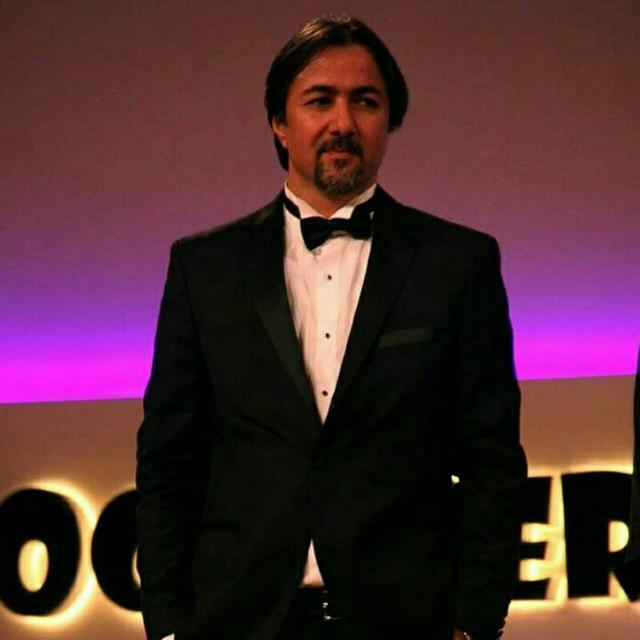
- Born: 11 December 1971 (age 54); Sanandaj, Kurdistan province, Iran
- Education: University of Tehran; Tehran University of Art
- Occupations: Film director, screenwriter, film producer, Set Designer, Painter, Illustrator, Graphic Designer.
- Years active: 1982–present
- Notable work: Whisper with the Wind; Black Horse Memories; The last uncounted village

Shahram Alidi (Persian: شهرام علیدی; born 11 December 1971 in Sanandaj, Kurdistan, Iran) is an Iranian film director, screenwriter, and film producer. He is also a painter, illustrator, and graphic designer. Alidi is part of a generation of filmmakers in the Iranian New Wave. These filmmakers share many common techniques including the use of poetic dialogue
and allegorical story telling. His credits include the 2009 film Whisper with the wind.

== Background ==
Alidi's first artistic experience was as an actor in school theaters. Later he started painting that continued into his late teens, winning many first prizes in the National Arts Competitions before he started studying painting at Tehran University, Faculty of Fine Arts. Later he graduated in M.A. in Animation Directing in Art University, Cinema and Theater Faculty. He has worked extensively as graphic designer, interior designer, illustrator for children books, Stage designer in theater and cinema, title designer during 1994–7.

== Filmography ==
- Long Feature Film:
  - 2015: Black Horse Memories – Feature – H.D – 90 min
  - 2009: Whisper with the Wind – Feature – 35mm – 77 min
- Short Films:
  - 2010: Ode of Mirror – Poetic Fiction – H.D – 12 min
  - 2009: A Rosary – Poetic Fiction – H.D – 10 min
  - 2008: Quatrain of Water – Poetic Fiction – H.D – 12 min
  - 2006: Mountains of Tehran – Documentary – D.V – 20 min
  - 2005: The Breath – Documentary – D.V – 20 min
  - 2003: Dreamless village – Fiction- D.V – 20 min
  - 2003: Button (Dokme)- Fiction- D.V – 13 min
  - 2003: The last uncounted village – Fiction – D.V – 15 min
  - 2000: The Ground is hard, the sky is far – Fiction – Beta cam – 20 min
  - 1999: The Heavenly doors – Documentary – Beta – 15 min
  - 1998: Milk (Shote) – Fiction – Beta – 30 min
  - 1997: Mamli – Fiction/Documentary – 16 mm – 20 min

== Events ==
- Awards for "Whisper with the Wind":
  - 2010: Tromso Film Festival / Golden Don Quixote /Norway
  - 2009: Bratislava Film Festival / Young Academic Student Jury Prize /Slovakia, Pessac International Historic Film Festival/ Prize of Academic Jury/France, Amazon Film Festival / Special Jury Award/Brazil, Mumbai International Film Festival/Prize of Mumbai Young Critics Award/India.
  - 'Cannes' International Film Festival/France/Critic Weeks Section/ Competitor for Golden Camera:
    - The Best Feature Film's ACID support
    - Prize of View of Youth
    - Prize of Young European Critics

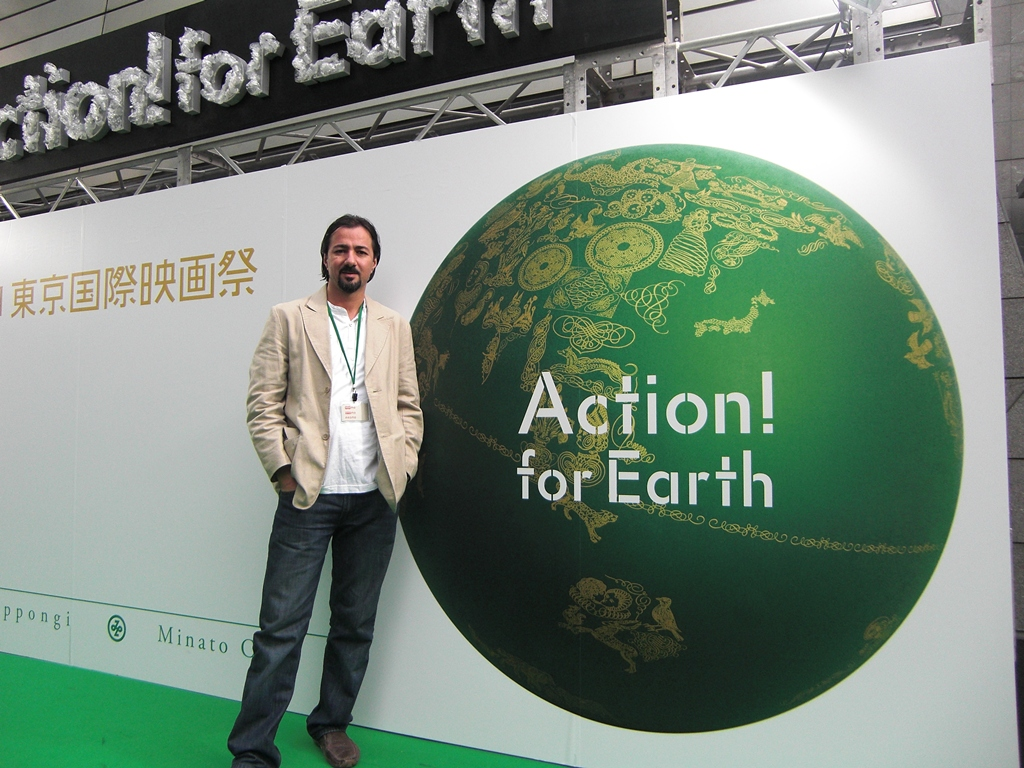
Action for Earth

- Awards of "The last uncounted village":
  - The first Sony company Festival /the best film /Iran /2002.
  - Avanca Festival /the best film /Portugal /2003.
  - Busan Festival / Different cinema of Asia / South Korea / 2003.
  - Tehran short film Festival /the best film, A level / Iran / 2003.
  - D’ournise Festival / Kurdistan cinema /France / 2003.
  - Clermont – Ferrand /Elected by viewers /France /2003.
  - Aroca Festival / the best scenario (script) Portugal /2004.
  - Soleymanieh Festival /special prize by Jury /Iraq/2004.
  - Imago Festival /Elected by viewers/Portugal /2004.
  - Hamburg Festival /Francois O’dae Prize /Germany / 2004.
  - Torino Festival /Special Prize by Jury /Italy /2004.
- Awards for "Black Horse Memories":
  - 20th Busan International Film Festival/ South Korea. 1 – 10 October/ 2015.
  - 2nd Brisbane Asia Pacific Film Festival/ Australia. 19–29 November 2015.
  - 9th Asia Pacific Screen Awards, Brisbane/ Australia. 26 November/ 2015.
  - 15th !f Istanbul International Independent Film Festival/ Turkey/ 18–28 February/ 2016/"!f Inspired Competition" section
  - 4th Duhok International Film Festival/ Kurdistan Region/ Iraq. 9–16 September/ 2016.
  - Slemani International Film Festival/ Kurdistan Region, Iraq/ 1–4 October/ 2016 "Competition"
  - Winner of: *Special Jury Prize*
  - 9th Kurdish Filmdays "Sercavan" Vienna, Austria/ 24 – 27 November/ 2016.
