= Whisper with the Wind =

Whisper With the Wind
- Directed by: Shahram Alidi
- Screenplay by: Shahram Alidi
- Produced by: Shahram Alidi
- Starring: Omar Chawshin; Maryam Boubani; Fakhr Mohammad Barzani; Valid Marouf Jarou; Mohara, Hossein Ghadr; Bistoun Ali Ghadr
- Edited by: Hayedeh Safiyari
- Release date: 2009
- Running time: 77 minutes
- Country: Iran
- Language: Kurdish

Whisper With the Wind is a 2009 Kurdish drama film written and directed by Shahram Alidi in his first film.

== Plot ==
In the years of military asphyxia in dictatorial regime of Saddam, in a very bad situation that everything was under the regime's control, people find any available way to keep in touch together. An old man is the post-man in a wide area of Kurdistan Iraq. His job is to deliver people's messages but not written one, but oral messages. He is an oral post-man and records and sells the messages of the folk and gets income in this way.

== Cast ==
- Omar Chawshin: Mam Baldar
- Maryam Boubani: Mam Boldar's wife
- Fakhr Mohammad Barzani: Kak Shamal
- Valid Marouf Jarou: Radio announcer
- Mohara, Hossein Ghadr: Radio serviceman
- Bistoun Ali Ghadr: Deserting soldier

== Awards ==
- Cannes International Film Festival- France- Critic Weeks Section- 2009- Competitor for Golden Camera- Three Prizes:
  - The Best Feature Film's ACID support
  - Prize of View of Youth
  - Prize of Young European Critics
- Mumbai International Film Festival- Prize of Mumbai Young Critics Award- India- 2009
- Amazon Film Festival- Special Jury Award- Brazil- 2009
- Pessac International Historic Film Festival- Prize of Academic Jury- France- 2009
- Student Academy Awards of Bratislava- Bratislava Film festival- Slovak- 2009
