= The Insiders Guide to Love =

New Zealand drama series (2005)

- Directed by: Brendan Donovan
- Starring: Will Hall; Gareth Reeves; Louis Sutherland; Kate Elliott; Ryan O'Kane; Serena Cotton; Yvette Reid
- Country of origin: New Zealand
- No. of episodes: 7

Production
- Producer: Ray Grimely-Taylor
- Running time: 45 minutes

Original release
- Network: TVNZ
- Release: 7 November 2005 – 2006

The Insiders Guide to Love is a New Zealand drama series directed by Brendan Donovan which went to air on TVNZ from 2005 to 2006.

== Plot ==
The series explores the lives of a group of seven previously unconnected people. Each is implicated in a bizarre incident, the outcome of which forces them to examine and explore the loves in their own lives. The series is a prequel to the show The Insider's Guide To Happiness, with James the only character in common.

== Cast ==
- Will Hall as James
- Gareth Reeves as Luc
- Louis Sutherland as Marty
- Kate Elliott as Nicole
- Ryan O'Kane as Brad
- Serena Cotton as Rachel
- Yvette Reid as Maxine
- Camille Keenan as Asha
- James Ashcroft as Dr. Paul

== Episode Listing ==
1. Fallen in Love Lately?
2. Can Love Make You Sick?
3. Is Love An Illusion?
4. Would You Love Me If I Was Different?
5. Can You Accept Love?
6. Who Taught You to Love?
7. The Power of Love
