= The Six Dollar Fifty Man =

- Directed by: Mark Albiston; Louis Sutherland
- Written by: Louis Sutherland
- Starring: Oscar Vandy-Connor; Celina Russo-Bewick; Nick Blake; Carmel McClone; Thomas Kimber; Sam Ahie
- Release date: 2009
- Running time: 15 min.
- Country: New Zealand

The Six Dollar Fifty Man is a short film (15 minutes) directed by Mark Albiston and Louis Sutherland and written by Sutherland. The film premiered in the Short Film competition of Festival de Cannes in 2009 where it received Special Distinction. The Six Dollar Fifty Man tells the story of Andy, a gutsy 8-year-old boy who is forced to break out of his make-believe superhero world to deal with playground bullies. The title is a play on The Six Million Dollar Man.

== Cast ==
- Andy: Oscar Vandy-Connor
- Mary: Celina Russo-Bewick
- Mr Hannah: Nick Blake
- Mrs Rainer: Carmel McGlone
- Max: Thomas Kimber
- Jason: Sam Ahie
- School Kids: Te Horo and Raumati Beach Schools

== Awards ==
- Special Distinction - 62nd Festival De Cannes, France
- Coopers Award for Best Short Film - Flickerfest, Australia (1)
- Jury Prize in International Short Filmmaking - Sundance Film Festival, USA (1)
- Special Mention - 60th Internationale Filmfestspiele Berlin– Generation Kplus, Germany
- Best Drama - Aspen Shortsfest, USA (1)
- Best Narrative Short - 20th Annual Cinequest Film Festival, USA (1)
- Special Jury Award - NY Children's International Film Festival, USA
- Silver Spike – 55th Valladolid International Film Festival, Spain
- Best Narrative Short - Middle East International Film Festival, United Arab Emirates
- Best International Short Fiction Film - Expression en Corto, Mexico
- British Academy of Film and Television Arts (BAFTA), Los Angeles - Prize for Excellence - Aspen Shortsfest, USA
- Best Short Film - Magma Short Film Festival, N.Z.
- Best Short Film - Corto In Bra, Italy
- Best International Short Film - Dokufest, Kosovo
- Best Short Film - Vladivostok International Film Festival, Russia
- Best International Short Film - La Boca del Lobo Film Festival, Spain
- Best Short Film – 24fps International Short Film Festival, USA
- Best of Festival – St. Louis Film Festival, USA
- Audience Award, International Competition - ‘Sequence’ Toulouse Short Film Festival, France

(1) Academy Qualifying Awards
