= Louis Sutherland =

New Zealand film director

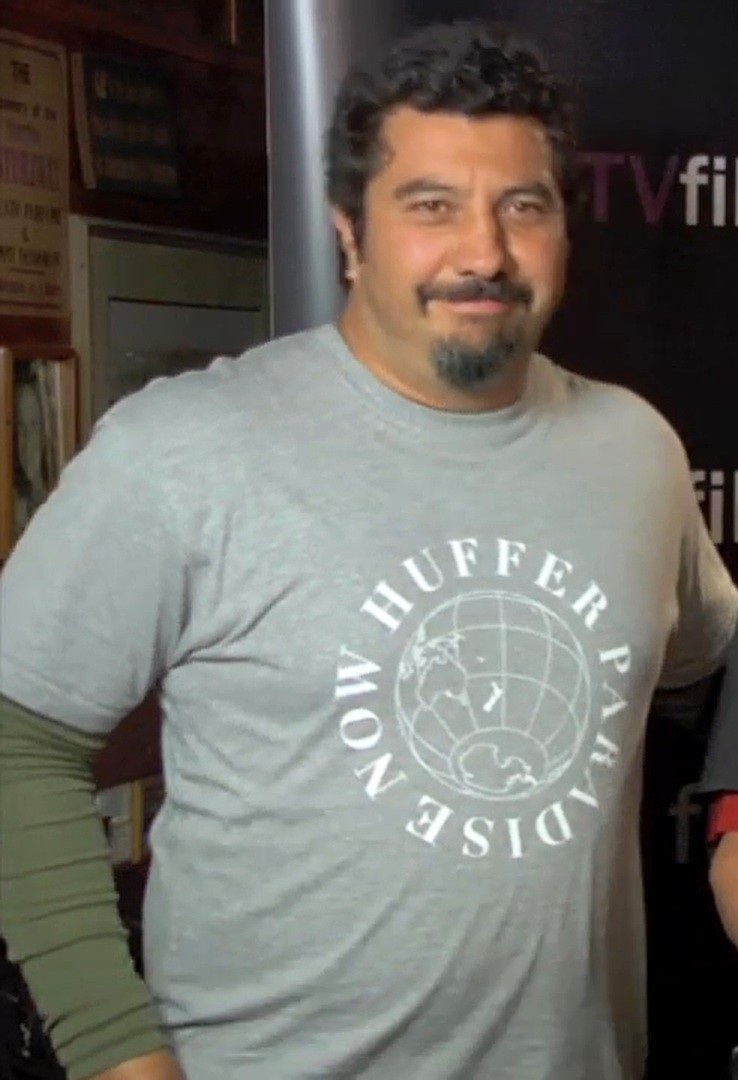
- Sutherland in 2013
- Occupations: Actor; Director; Screenwriter
- Years active: 2002–present

Louis Sutherland is a New Zealand film, television and advertising director and actor. He is of Samoan and Scottish descent, and based in Wellington.

Sutherland studied at Toi Whakaari (The New Zealand Drama School, Wellington) where he worked with childhood friend Mark Albiston, creating a graduation short film. After creating the award winning short films Run (2007) and The Six Dollar Fifty Man (2009), the duo co-directed their award-winning debut feature Shopping (2013).

== Career ==
In 2000, Sutherland won a place at the Toi Whakaari Drama School where he first developed his dramatic talents, graduating in 2003 with a Bachelor of Performing Arts (Acting). He went on to work as a character actor for the stage and screen. Sutherland worked as an actor on a number of feature film projects King Kong and Black Sheep as well as TV projects including the acclaimed TV drama The Insider’s Guide to Love.

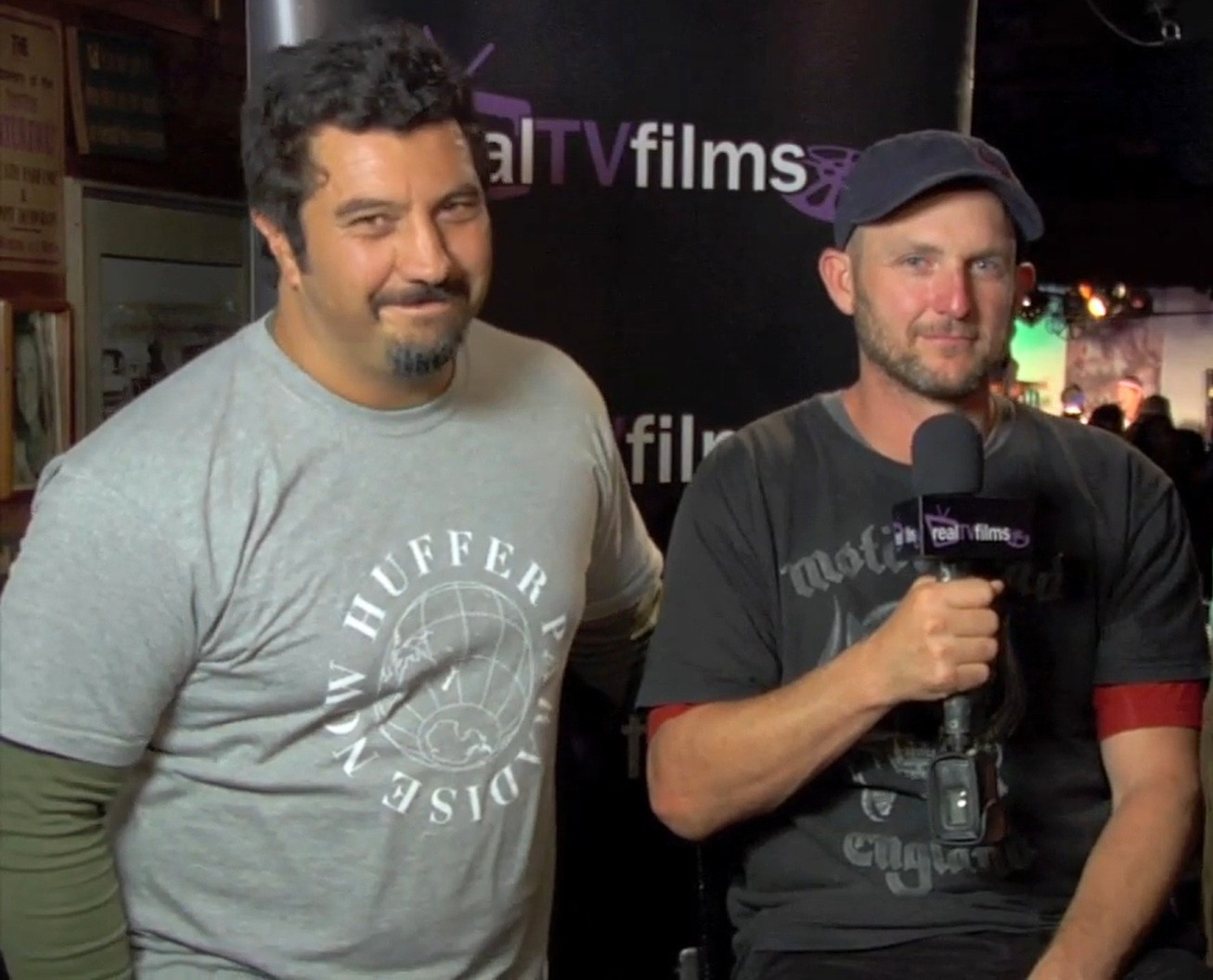
Sutherland and Mark Albiston in 2013

In 2007, Sutherland wrote and starred in the Cannes Film Festival award-winning piece Run. Created in collaboration with Mark Albiston, the film secured a Special Mention in the Short Film category at the Cannes.

Sutherland later partnered with Mark Albiston under the directing banner Mark & Louis to create their follow up short film The Six Dollar Fifty Man which earned Special Distinction at the 2009 Cannes Film Festival. The film went on to win major awards at both Sundance and the International Film Festival in Berlin. To date, it is the most successful short film for the New Zealand Film Commission.

At the 2013 Sundance Film Festival Sutherland premiered Shopping, his feature film co-directorial debut with Mark Albiston. Based largely on experiences from his own childhood, the film received rave reviews and earned several awards including a Grand Prix at the Berlin International Film Festival and seven New Zealand Film Awards including Best Film, Best Screenplay, and Best Director.

Sutherland has increasingly focused on his directorial career, passing up acting opportunities to work as a film and commercials director.

== Filmmaking style ==
Sutherland's films have been auto-biographical to an extent, based on his experiences of growing up on the Kapiti Coast in New Zealand. This approach to writing and directing has given the films a "heartfelt" and honest tone, helping create "an emotional immediacy in the performances". Sutherland has displayed a deft hand at working with children in his short and feature films, and this trait is also apparent in his commercial work for the Alannah & Madeline Foundation, Otto and others.

Sutherland has detailed his process as a director, casting extensively and immersing cast in entire worlds, something he's experienced personally as an actor.

== Acting filmography ==
=== Television ===
Year	Title	Role	Notes
2002	The Strip	Waiter	Episode: "The 'Joy' of Sex" (S01E09)
2005-2006	Seven Periods with Mr Gormsby	Hone Hakanui	Main role
2006	The Insider's Guide To Love	Marty	Main role
2021	Wellington Paranormal	Wiremu	Episode: "The Sevens Ghosts" (S03E04)

=== Film ===
Year	Title	Role	Notes
2005	King Kong	Venture Crew #14	
2006	Black Sheep	Winston	Comedy / Horror
2010	Choice Night	Coach	Drama - Short film

== Awards ==
YEAR	AWARD	ORGANISATION
2007	Cannes Film Festival	Honourable Mention Winner - Short Film Run
2009	Cannes Film Festival	Special Distinction Winner - Six Dollar Fifty Man
2009	En Corto International Film Festival	Best International Short Film - Six Dollar Fifty Man
2009	Abu Dhabi Film Festival	Special Narrative Short Winner - Six Dollar Fifty Man
2009	New Zealand Film and TV Awards	Winner - Silver Spike - Six Dollar Fifty Man
2009	Valladolid International Film Festival	Special Narrative Short Winner - Six Dollar Fifty Man
2010	Sundance Film Festival	Jury Prize in International Film Making - Six Dollar Fifty Man
2010	Berlin International Film Festival	Special Mention - Six Dollar Fifty Man
2010	Cinequest Film Festival	Best Narrative Short Film - Six Dollar Fifty Man
2010	Aspen Shortfest	Best Drama, BAFTA/LA Award for Excellence Film - Six Dollar Fifty Man
2013	NZ Film and TV Awards	Winner - Best Film / Best Director / Best Screenplay / Best Supporting Actor / Best Supporting Actress / Best Cinematography - Shopping
2013	Berlin International Film Festival	Winner - Grand Prix, Generation International Jury - Shopping
