= Zac Smith (Shortland Street) =

- Shortland Street character
- Portrayed by: Mike Edward
- Duration: 1995–1996, 2002, 2012–2013
- First appearance: 10 May 1995
- Last appearance: 6 February 2013
- Introduced by: Gavin Strawhan (1995); Harriet Crampton (2002); Steven Zanoski (2012)
- Book appearances: Kirsty and Lionel - Shortland Street Books (1996)
In-universe information
- Occupation: Nurse at Shortland Street Hospital (2012–13); Bartender (1996–2002); Builder (until 1995)
- Father: Phillip Smith
- Mother: Jane Smith
- Half-brothers: James Thornton

Zachary Smith is a fictional character on the New Zealand soap opera Shortland Street who has been portrayed by Mike Edward in multiple guest stints since mid 1995. The character returned in a more central role for the shows 20th anniversary in 2012.

Zac appeared in numerous stints throughout the show's first 20 years, initially debuting in May 1995 as a short term love interest for Grace Kwan (Lynette Forday). He was later involved in a high-profile revelation that he was the half brother of established character, James Thornton (Chris Dykzeul). Zac returned 6 years later as part of Rachel McKenna's (Angela Bloomfield) alcoholism storyline before his return in 2012 saw him take on a more antagonistic role. His storylines saw him have a heated affair despite being in a relationship and later, sexually assault Roimata Samuels (Shavaughn Ruakere) in a personal attack on her husband.

Zac has been labelled a "hottie" and his generally remembered for his good looks. His later storylines saw Zac branded as one of the best Shortland Street villains of all time, being praised by reviewers and stars of the soap itself.

== Creation and casting ==
Mike Edward was just 21 when he cast in the role of Zac in 1995. Part of the role in which producers intended Shortland Street to participate in, was to accurately portray and convey real life community and everyday occurrences. The character of Zac was written as a builder so as to embody the role of the working class man. Edward maintained the role until mid 1996. Edward returned to the role on 23 November 2002 in a month-long recurring stint. Edward auditioned numerous times throughout the next few years but was constantly rejected due to producer's suspecting the audience would recognize him as Zac. In 2011 the role of "Jack" was created, a love interest for Sarah Potts (Amanda Billing) who would cheat on her in a high-profile love triangle. The character and storyline was decided to unfold over 6 months in a bid for slower paced story arcs. Producers soon realized they could fill the characters spot with that of Zac and Edward was hired.

In January 2012 it was announced that a previous character would be returning and "will get the hearts of many a Shortland Street pounding." In February it was confirmed that it was Zac who was returning. The character returned on 1 February 2012. Edward was happy that producers decided to reintroduce Zac instead of bringing in a new character, stating "He [Zac] keeps coming back which is kind of genius." Following the conclusion of the character's arc and the 6 months, producers decided to extend Edward's contract and have Zac undergo a storyline where he sexually assaulted Roimata Samuels (Shavaughn Ruakere). Edward enjoyed the challenge but acknowledged, "it's going to be the end because it's so irredeemable." Chris Tempest (who portrayed Dr. Josh Gallagher) stood in as Zac during the sexual assault scene to leave the assailant ambiguous. Zac made his last appearance on 6 February 2013 and Edward had no quarrels with leaving the role, "I'm happy to move on. The last few times Zac has left the show, his parting lines have been, 'I'm just going to sit on the beach and get my head together', so at least now it's done." Edward was not opposed to a return, but acknowledged it was up to the producers.

== Storylines ==
Zac arrived as a builder on Lionel (John Leigh) and Kirsty's (Angela Dotchin) new house after being recommended by Julia (Elizabeth Hawthorne). Zac became the talk of the town due to his good looks and ended up leaving Ferndale after briefly dating Grace Kwan (Lynette Forday). Zac returned several months later and with the help of Julia's son James (Chris Dykzeul), managed to track down his father, Phillip, on the internet. However it soon turned out that James was the result of an affair between Julia and Phillip, thus making him Zac's half brother. When Julia's husband died, Zac slowly was welcomed into the Thornton family. In 1996 Zac dated Ana Fa'asolo (Mary Lose) but she soon realized that Zac had developed a mutual attraction to Julia. Zac was disgusted when he discovered this attraction and he fled Ferndale to rid himself of these feelings. He returned 6 years later and impressed many with his flashy apartment and his job at an upper class bar, none more so than Rachel McKenna (Angela Bloomfield). With her relationship on the rocks, a small spark between Rachel and Zac brewed potential romance but when her alcoholism lead her to nearly drown in his pool, Zac harshly dumped her and fled Ferndale.

In 2012 Zac returned when he was hired by Sarah Potts (Amanda Billing) to care for her brain damaged son Daniel (Ido Drent) as he had become a nurse. The two soon started to date and Zac got employed at the hospital. Despite appearing devoted, Zac started an affair with his boss, Vasa Levi (Teuila Blakely). The affair was short lived but when the truth was revealed, Sarah broke it off and much of the hospital staff turned against Zac, primarily brought on by Sarah's ex-husband TK Samuels' (Benjamin Mitchell) input. In November the staff were shocked when TK's wife Roimata (Shavaughn Ruakere) was sexually assaulted by an unseen assailant in what seemed an attack on TK. It soon turned out Zac was the attacker and he framed Josh (Chris Tempest) after landing TK with a reckless driving charge from a poisoned drink. When Roimata discovered Zac was the culprit, much of the hospital turned against him and he ended up kidnapping her and holding her hostage for several days in 'The I.V.' cellar. Enough evidence was soon collected to prove Zac had taken her and he was arrested and charged. In June 2014, a neighborhood watch team was created in part due to the legacy of Zac and his attack on Roimata.

== Character development ==
Edward debuted as Zac at the age of 21, and was regarded as a "hunk".

=== Characterisation ===
Upon his first appearance, Zac was labelled a "hottie", however during his storylines 17 years later, he was referred to as a "sleaze". His initial storyline with Julia (Elizabeth Hawthorne) saw the character debut as a "troublesome toyboy" and his "wild ways were far from redeemable." Edward found that Zac was determined, stating; "Zac will fight here, bust up there." He was described as handsome, easy going and "used to the adoring gaze of women and men alike." Despite being called "wiser" and "more experienced" in his 2012 return, Edward disputed the label, saying; "I don't think he's a lot wiser. In many ways, he has stalled in his life. He doesn't have a lot of money. He's a bit 'kept', which will lead to tensions down the track." Edward also agreed that Zac was led astray by women and often focused too heavily on them. A new side of Zac was shown in April when he openly and continuously pursued a sexual relationship with Vasa (Teuila Blakely) despite his partnership with Sarah (Amanda Billing). Upon accepting the return to the role, Edward was aware that Zac would be a "love-rat" but did not realize the extent of the villainy he was going to undergo. Edward acknowledged the antagonistic characteristics of his character, stating "I think there's definitely so much more darkness to Zac .... he's got a lot of aggression and anger that hasn't even been touched on yet." On the character's villainous attitude, Edward stated "It's interesting when I play him because I do the scenes and I don't actually feel that bad doing it. Then I see it cut together and go, 'oh my gosh, that's actually a bit naughty!'" However he confessed he liked Zac as a character due to the fact he was: "very unapologetic." Edward was happy to play Zac as a villain, "Shows need bad guys and soap operas need villains ... I'm more than happy to play the villain to tell a good story." When asked to describe Zac in a sentence, Edward jokingly referred to him as, "a very misunderstood man" and despite cheating on her for months and not actually appearing if he did, Edward believed Zac genuinely loved Sarah but was just too insecure to show it. The Otago Daily Times reviewer, Charles Loughrey, described Zac as a, "love-rat with an increasingly obvious penchant for extreme villainy". Edward himself later referred to Zac as "evil".

=== Sexual assault of Roimata Samuels ===
Following the extension of Edward's contract, producers decided to undergo a sexual assault storyline utilizing the character of Zac. They wished not only to develop his character and the story, but also portray an ethical and real issue in society. Edward explained, "They had a six-month arc for him initially, so that basically took it to him being with Sarah and having the affair with Vasa and then Sarah finding out. Then it was around the six-month point where I got told they were going to keep me on. I asked them what was going to happen and they weren't too clear ... then about two months into it I got told." Throughout 2012, the relationship between Zac and Sarah's ex-husband TK Samuels (Benjamin Mitchell) was portrayed as rocky, with the two men's contrasting feelings for Sarah playing a major part. In November a scene aired where TK's wife, Roimata (Shavaughn Ruakere) was sexually assaulted in an alleyway following her birthday party. Sexual assault storylines had previously occurred in Shortland Street (such as the rape of Minnie Crozier (Katrina Devine) in 1998), but Ruakere felt Roimata's was portrayed with "the most depth needed".

"It is a big topic and you want to treat it with respect - not so much from my character's point of view, because he's the bad guy, but certainly Shav [Ruakere] (Roimata Samuels) and Ben [Mitchell] (TK Samuels) needed to treat the fallout with respect for people who have been through it."

— Edward on the sexual assault storyline.

Behind the scenes, Zac was always intended to be the perpetrator but the assailant was depicted anonymously so as to create suspense. To further the illusion that it was not Zac, directors shot the assault scene with Chris Tempest (Josh Gallagher) actually physically carrying it out, whilst Sam Bunkall (Boyd Rolleston) added the voice over. The trick successfully fooled much of the audience, with many believing it was in fact Beulah Koale's (Jared Afeaki) voice. Edward found not actually playing the assault made his work a lot easier, "I guess in a lot of ways that was good because the way I reasoned with Zac is the compartmentalize. He's got the amazing ability to put something in a box and put something else in another box and keep the two entirely separate. So having no memory of it and feeling totally innocent of the performance of it, kind of helped in lots of ways." On screen Zac was interviewed by police when footprints matching his boots were identified at the scene of the crime. Though Zac denied any involvement and was even backed by ex lover, Vasa Levi (Teuila Blakely). However, on 12 December 2012, Zac was revealed to the audience as the attacker when he threatened Detective Lisa Stone (Caitlin Bossley) and later removed a balaclava to expose his face.

The characters soon started to discover the attacker had assaulted Roimata as a personal attack on TK. Further harassments included the assailant breaking into the house and sprawling out Roimata's underwear and later leaving a white feather on the doorstep. During the 2012 season cliffhanger, Zac was described as a, "a master puppeteer". He was said to be playing TK, Roimata, Sarah and Josh, "like pawns in his own twisted game of chess, moving suspicions from one person to the other in order to keep his identity under wraps" and it appeared as though he were "unstoppable". As the year ended, Zac poisoned TK and used several tricks to frame Josh for the attack However, with Josh's input, Roimata realised Zac was the attacker and publicly accused him, causing him to lose what little friends he had left. With his dwindling amount of friends, in early 2013 Zac decided to take drastic action in exacting revenge on TK. He kidnapped Roimata, bound and drugged her and locked her in the cellar of 'The I.V.' bar. After Roimata was eventually recovered, Zac was arrested and charged after she collected enough DNA evidence to have him charged.

== Reception ==
Zac has been immortalized, being listed as one of the numerous men the iconic Rachel McKenna (Angela Bloomfield) romanced and is generally well regarded as a "hunk" and a "hottie". Edward expressed his hope that the character would become one of the soap's best ever villains. Amy Usherwood (Emma Franklin) named Zac as the character besides her own whom she would enjoy playing, due to the fact: "he gets to be naughty". Reviewer Dionne Christian labelled Zac: "Shortland Street's resident love rat". Blogger Bridget Jones hoped that the end of the 2012 season of Shortland Street would see the end of Zac's manipulative behaviour. Zac was described by one reviewer as, "one of the most manipulative creeps and terrifyingly clever assailants that Shortland Street has ever seen". The development of the character of Zac following his attack on Roimata, was named by Rebecca Barry Hill of The New Zealand Herald as a satisfying continuation of the drama brought on by the shows 20th anniversary in May. Zac's return to the soap, his love triangle between Sarah (Amanda Billing) and Vasa (Teuila Blakely), alongside his shirtless confrontation with TK Samuels (Benjamin Mitchell) and later sexual assault of Roimata (Shavaughn Ruakere), were all named as part of the top moments of the 2012 Shortland Street season. In 2013, Zac's return was listed as the 8th best ever character return on the soap by the Shortland Street website. A reviewer from The Otago Daily Times highlighted how successful the character of Zac was and noted a surprise in the character not being like "99%" of the characters, in that he wasn't a doctor. He commented that the character obviously spent too much time at the gym and mentioned the increasing amount of soap opera storyline climaxes involving locking characters in cellars. However he also noted that the character of Zac was sure to be written off due to the content of his story lines. Although Edward received a fair amount of verbal abuse on the streets, he expected a more physical tone due to past experiences with Johnny Barker (Joey Henderson), whose character murdered 5 woman. Upon ending his stint, Edward acknowledged that Zac was liked by fans when he first arrived in 2012 but by the end, had become a character fans, "loved to hate". In the Ferndale Talk Best of 2013 awards, Zac's conclusion was voted the fans second favourite storyline and 3rd most shocking plot twist. Television New Zealand named the kidnap storyline as the second best moment of the 2013 season. In 2015 a New Zealand Herald author described Zac as one of the "most evil" characters in the soap's history.
