= List of Shortland Street characters introduced in 2007 =

The following is a list of characters that first appeared in the New Zealand soap opera Shortland Street in 2007, by order of first appearance.

== Meg Harris ==
Meg Harris
- Shortland Street character
- Portrayed by: Emily Mowbray
- Duration: 2007
- First appearance: 31 January 2007
- Last appearance: 31 July 2007
- Introduced by: Jason Daniel
In-universe information
- Occupation: Nurse

Meg Harris was an old nursing school friend of Alice Piper (Toni Potter). Alice tried to set Meg up with Craig Valentine (Renato Bartolomei) but ended up falling for him herself. Meg gained a job at the hospital and following the arrest of Kieran Mitchell (Adam Rickitt) for the suspicion of being The Ferndale Strangler, Meg agreed to be a police informant, eventually to be discovered by Kieran. After having a drunken one night stand with Mark Weston (Tim Foley) days later, Meg's naked body was found, making her the second victim of the serial killer.

== Beth Wilson ==
Beth Wilson
- Shortland Street character
- Portrayed by: Hannah Marshall
- Duration: 2007
- First appearance: 5 February 2007
- Last appearance: 28 September 2007
- Introduced by: Jason Daniel
In-universe information
- Occupation: Nurse

Beth Wilson was a nurse from the bureau. She arrived in February and returned in September when she attacked Joey Henderson (Johnny Barker), believing he was the Ferndale Strangler. Beth later went missing and her body was found in a park, making her the serial killers fourth victim.

== Gavin Capper ==
Gavin Capper
- Shortland Street character
- Portrayed by: Tim Schijf
- Duration: 2007
- First appearance: 14 February 2007
- Last appearance: 12 December 2007
- Introduced by: Jason Daniel

Dr. Gavin Capper was a doctor at the hospital. Gavin's strange behaviour and sadistic sexuality led many to believe he was the Ferndale Strangler. In December, Gavin was arrested for the murders but the charges were dropped only for Gavin to be charged with rape, an act he and Justin Salt (Heath Jones) had participated in at medical school.

== Kieran Mitchell ==
Kieran Mitchell was the mysterious badboy who arrived in town with little memory. He was portrayed by Adam Rickitt and despite initially being a short term character, went on to become iconic after starring in several high-profile storylines that culminated in the characters death in the first ever 90-minute episode in 2010.

== James Scott ==
James "Scotty" Scott
- Shortland Street character
- Portrayed by: Kiel McNaughton
- Duration: 2007–11
- First appearance: Episode 3691; 19 March 2007
- Last appearance: 11 August 2011
- Introduced by: Jason Daniel
In-universe information
- Occupation: Nursing Manager at Shortland Street Hospital (2007–11)
- Father: Jimmy Scott
- Mother: Hine Ryan
- Brothers: Patrick Scott
- Sisters: Rebecca Scott
- Wife: Shanti Kumari (2008–09); Tracey Morrison (2011—)
- Daughters: Unnamed daughter
- Adoptive sons: Kitu Scott
- Nephews: Jessie Scott
- Nieces: Amy Scott

James Owen "Scotty" Scott first appeared in a guest stint in March 2007. He was hired as the temporary replacement for Toni Warner's (Laura Hill) nursing manager duties and instantly clashed with Maia Jeffries (Anna Jullienne) due to his apparent homophobia. He returned permanently several months later and instantly connected with Shanti Kumari (Nisha Madhan) and the two started to date. Scotty came under suspicion for being the Ferndale Strangler and he and Shanti broke up when he discovered she was engaged. Nonetheless, the two reconciled and married in a 4-day Hindu ceremony. The couple purchased a house but the marriage was on the rocks when Scotty's criminal brother, Tai (Xavier Horan) was sent back to prison. Shanti fell pregnant but tragically died and Scotty struggled with everyday routines but overcame his grief with the help of Tracey Morrison (Sarah Thomson). Scotty and Tracey eventually fell in love but he developed a brain tumour after being poisioned by Penny Rourke (Carolyn Dando) and struggled to accept his drug addict mother, Hine Ryan (Rena Owen), leading to the relationship to end. The two reconciled and married on Valentine's Day 2011. Scotty and Tracey adopted a young boy named Kitu (Christian Edmonds) and travelled to East Timor to help children in need, shortly after Tracey announced she was pregnant.

In 2012 Sarah Potts (Amanda Billing) announced that the two had given birth to a baby daughter and the couple soon sold their house to Luke Durville (Gerald Urquhart).

== Angus Phelps ==
Angus Phelps
- Shortland Street character
- Portrayed by: Elliot Christensen-Yule
- Duration: 2007–08
- First appearance: 22 March 2007
- Last appearance: 1 May 2008
- Introduced by: Jason Daniel

Angus Phelps was the teenage sufferer of Tourettes Syndrome. Angus was first seen as a friend of Scarlett Valentine (Nicole Thomson), but later grew a crush on Sophie McKay (Kimberley Crossman). After Sophie broke up with Nate Adamson (Damien Harrison), she and Angus finally got together however Angus' high level of intelligence contrasted with Sophie's social life and they broke up. Angus returned the following year and was disgusted when he attended the boy racing event where Tane (Dominic Ona-Ariki) got paralysed.

== Suchin Srisai ==
Suchin Srisai
- Shortland Street character
- Portrayed by: Kristine Caluya
- Duration: 2007
- First appearance: 12 April 2007
- Last appearance: 19 June 2007
- Introduced by: Jason Daniel
In-universe information
- Occupation: Prostitute

Suchin Srisai was the ex lover of Kieran Mitchell (Adam Rickitt). When Kieran started to have memory problems, he briefly mistook Claire (Emily Robins) for Suchin. Suchin later showed up in June and revealed she used to work for Kieran as a prostitute before they dated. The two had scammed White Dragon (Matt Sunderland) out of thousands of dollars and Suchin had arrived to claim it. After finally accessing the account, Kieran paid Suchin out and she left. In 2010 it was revealed Suchin had told White Dragon of Kieran's location after he potentially raped her.

== Liz Arthur ==
Liz Arthur
- Shortland Street character
- Portrayed by: Rima Te Wiata
- Duration: 2007
- First appearance: 26 April 2007
- Last appearance: 15 May 2007
- Introduced by: Jason Daniel
In-universe information
- Other names: Irihapiti Samuels (maiden name)
- Occupation: Travel agent
- Mother: Mareikura Samuels
- Brothers: Mitch Samuels; Wiremu Samuels
- Sisters: Kuini Samuels; Miri Samuels; Dotti Samuels
- Sons: Luke Samuels; TK Samuels
- Granddaughters: Gia Te Atakura; Tillie Samuels
- Nephews: Wiremu Potae; Tane Samuels
- Nieces: Huia Samuels; Esther Samuels

Irihapiti "Liz" Arthur (née Samuels) was the estranged mother of TK Samuels (Benjamin Mitchell). She returned to TK's life for his marriage to Sarah Potts (Amanda Billing) but ended up taking over the wedding preparations. She later backed down and confessed she was so drunk at TK's conception she had no idea who his father was. Liz departed after the wedding.

== Jacqui ==
Jacqui
- Shortland Street character
- Portrayed by: Tabitha Avery
- Duration: 2007–15
- First appearance: May 2007
- Last appearance: 2015
- Introduced by: Jason Daniel
In-universe information
- Occupation: Waitress at The IV (2007–15)

Jacqui first appeared in May 2007, as an extra in 'The IV' bar. Jacqui mourned the murder of her boss Jay Copeland (Jaime Passier-Armstrong) and continued to work as a waitress under several different owners. In 2010 Kieran Mitchell (Adam Rickitt) suspected Jacqui of blackmailing him but uncovered the culprit as Jacqui's co worker – Jane (Sia Trokenheim). Throughout 2014, Jacqui became a shift manager at the bar, with owner Murray Cooper (Matt Chamberlain) often giving her extra shifts during his own family dramas. Jacqui stopped appearing in mid 2015.

Jacqui proved to be a fan favourite, with her winning 4th place for "Favourite Character" in the fan voted Ferndale Talk Best of 2013 Awards and being mentioned numerous times for an expanded role in the future.

== Shanti Kumari ==
Shanti Kumari
- Shortland Street character
- Portrayed by: Nisha Madhan
- Duration: 2007–09
- First appearance: 16 May 2007
- Last appearance: 23 October 2009
- Introduced by: Jason Daniel
In-universe information
- Occupation: Nurse
- Father: Naveen Kumari
- Mother: Shobna Kumari
- Brothers: Sunil Kumari
- Sisters: Grishma Kumari; Dipali Kumari
- Husband: James "Scotty" Scott (2008–09)
- Uncles: Vijay Kumari
- Aunts: Rani Kumari

Shanti Kumari was the naive Indian nurse who arrived in mid-2007. She developed a romance with Scotty (Kiel McNaughton) and ended up marrying him, defying her arranged marriage to Dinesh Jivani (Amin Sheikh). The couple bought a house that was a scene of a murder suicide and Shanti had the house blessed. They ran into financial trouble and Scotty became moody and began to drink when his brother Tai (Xavier Horan) got arrested. Shanti suggested they separate but the two reconciled and Shanti fell pregnant. However she suffered an ectopic pregnancy but it was masked by a fever she developed. The misdiagnosis saw Shanti suddenly die, leaving Scotty without a wife nor child.

== Joey Henderson ==
Joseph James "Joey" Henderson was the shy and eager nurse who was eventually revealed as the Ferndale Strangler, a serial killer who killed five of the hospital's nurses. The character was portrayed by Johnny Barker and now remains known as one of the show's most iconic storylines of all time.

== Steve Roberts ==
Steve Roberts
- Shortland Street character
- Portrayed by: Jason Fitch
- Duration: 2007
- First appearance: 21 June 2007
- Last appearance: 8 October 2007
- Introduced by: Jason Daniel
In-universe information
- Occupation: Orderly (2007)

Steve Roberts was the creepy orderly who arrived to the hospital shortly before Claire Solomon (Emily Robins) was murdered. As the murders continued many began to suspect the obsessive Steve and his sexual fantasies came into question. He began to date Beth Wilson (Hannah Marshall) but she realised he was stealing from the hospital and he was arrested for the murders after similar tubing to the murder weapons were found at his house. He was cleared but fired, with Beth getting murdered shortly after.

== Gary Davis ==
Gary Davis
- Shortland Street character
- Portrayed by: Tim Bray
- Duration: 2007
- Appears on: 25 June 2007
- Introduced by: Jason Daniel
In-universe information
- Wife: Brenda Holloway (until 2007)
- Sons: Lachlan Davis

Gary Davis was the gay ex-husband of Brenda Holloway (Katherine McRae). Gary arrived to hospital in June and required surgery for his terminal cancer. He ended up dying and left his son Lachlan Davis (Jonathan Mahon-Heap) to his boyfriend, upsetting Brenda greatly.

== Lachlan Davis ==
Lachlan Davis
- Shortland Street character
- Portrayed by: Jonathan Mahon-Heap
- Duration: 2007–2008
- First appearance: 25 June 2007
- Last appearance: 20 February 2008
- Introduced by: Jason Daniel (2007, 2008)
In-universe information
- Father: Gary Davis
- Mother: Brenda Holloway
- Uncles: Brian Rowley; John Rowley

Lachlan "Locky" Davis was the estranged son of Brenda Holloway (Katherine McRae) and her ex-husband Gary Davis. When his father died, Lachlan was reluctant to get to know his mother and ended up leaving with his father's boyfriend Nico. When he returned later that year, Brenda would buy him an iMac and try to reconnect, but after Brenda explained how her marriage to Gary ended and drove her to alcoholism, Lachlan rejected her and left. After Brenda was murdered, Lachlan returned for the last time in 2008 when he dropped some of Brenda's belongings to Yvonne (Alison Quigan) which contained papers unveiling her killer.

== Ryan Smith-Reynolds ==
Ryan Smith-Reynolds
- Shortland Street character
- Portrayed by: Reece Rodewyk
- Duration: 2007, 2009
- First appearance: 5 July 2007
- Last appearance: 15 April 2009
- Introduced by: Jason Daniel (2007); Steven Zanoski (2009)
In-universe information
- Mother: Alana Smith-Reynolds

Ryan Smith-Reynolds was a school bully who picked on Hunter McKay (Lee Donoghue). He was friends with Nate Adamson (Damien Harrison) but they fell out when he discovered Nate was gay. In 2009 Ryan returned as the best friend of Orlando Gunn (Chris McLennan-Jones) and bullied Daniel Potts (Ido Drent). However Ryan and Daniel bonded and the two started to sell stolen goods. Whilst driving the goods to a buyer, Ryan got in a serious car crash and fell into a coma. In July Daniel learned that Ryan had died.

== Nate Adamson ==
Nate Adamson
- Shortland Street character
- Portrayed by: Damien Harrison
- Duration: 2007
- First appearance: 5 July 2007
- Last appearance: 30 November 2007
- Introduced by: Jason Daniel
In-universe information
- Father: Shaun Adamson
- Mother: Tess Adamson

Nate Adamson was the gay schoolboy who had a crush on Hunter McKay (Lee Donoghue). To hide his sexuality and get closer to Hunter, he began to bully him and started to date his sister Sophie (Kimberley Crossman). However Nate was disgusted to learn Hunter was dating his mother Tess (Anita Torrance) and ran away. When he returned, he and his mother fled town.

== Tess Adamson ==
Tess Adamson
- Shortland Street character
- Portrayed by: Anita Torrance
- Duration: 2007
- First appearance: 11 July 2007
- Last appearance: 30 November 2007
- Introduced by: Jason Daniel
In-universe information
- Occupation: Nurse
- Husband: Shaun Adamson (until 2004)
- Sons: Nate Adamson

Tess Adamson was the single mother of Nate (Damien Harrison). Tess worked in the Primary Care Clinic with Callum McKay (Peter Mochrie) which then led her to meet the victim of her son's bully and Callum's son, Hunter (Lee Donoghue). After a brief flirtation with Dr Craig Valentine (Renato Bartolomei), Tess would quickly fall in love with Hunter and the two would scandalously start a relationship. After being caught kissing one night by Nate and being exposed to Hunter's parents, Hunter would move in with Tess who would be ostracized at work by Callum. After Nate ran away and was then returned to Tess by Hunter's parents, Tess began having doubts about the relationship. Tess fled town when Hunter proposed to her, telling him that she couldn't take the judgment from how people would see her.

== Rua Potae ==
Rua Potae
- Shortland Street character
- Portrayed by: Christoper Molloy
- Duration: 2007–2008, 2010
- First appearance: 17 July 2007
- Last appearance: 5 February 2010
- Introduced by: Jason Daniel (2007, 2008); Steven Zanoski (2010)
In-universe information
- Sons: Wiremu Potae

Rua Potae was the disproving father of Wiremu (Scott Cotter). Rua dropped Wiremu and Tane (Dominic Ona-Ariki) to his brother in law – TK's (Benjamin Mitchell) and several weeks later showed disappointment in his son for trying to climb the water tank. In 2008 Rua was quick to judge his son for running over Tane and in 2010 supported TK's mission for a health care clinic at the family marae.

== Tane Samuels ==
Tane Samuels
- Shortland Street character
- Portrayed by: Dominic Ona-Ariki
- Duration: 2007–2009
- First appearance: 17 July 2007
- Last appearance: 25 February 2009
- Introduced by: Jason Daniel (2007, 2008); Steven Zanoski (2009)
In-universe information
- Occupation: Nurse (2008—)
- Grandmothers: Liz Arthur
- Uncles: TK Samuels; Rua Potae
- Aunts: Sarah Potts; Roimata Samuels
- First cousins: Wiremu Potae

Tane Samuels was the teenage nephew of TK (Benjamin Mitchell). He arrived alongside his cousin Wiremu Potae (Scott Cotter) to attend music school in Auckland but quickly got into trouble when a hooker stole TK's wedding ring. Tane also took drugs before his performance and ended up becoming an orderly at the hospital before getting fired for stealing a wheelchair. He returned in 2008 and quit music school due to his belief he had little talent. He decided to become a nurse but his dreams were cut short when he attended drifts and was hit by a car travelling at high speeds driven by Wiremu. His spine was badly damaged and he was restricted to a wheel chair for the rest of his life. After attempting suicide, Tane slept with Sophie McKay (Kimberley Crossman) and travelled to a spinal unit in Christchurch. He returned in 2009 as a nurse at the hospital, using a specially designed wheelchair. Ingrid Campbell (Madeleine Lynch) was disgusted by Tane but grew to appreciate his work ethic. He stayed for several weeks before moving to another hospital.

In 2022, Ona-Ariki hinted at a return to the soap.

== Wiremu Potae ==
Wiremu Potae
- Shortland Street character
- Portrayed by: Scott Cotter
- Duration: 2007–2008
- First appearance: 11 July 2007
- Last appearance: 14 August 2008
- Introduced by: Jason Daniel (2007, 2008)
In-universe information
- Occupation: Music DJ
- Father: Rua Potae
- Grandmothers: Liz Arthur
- Uncles: TK Samuels
- Aunts: Sarah Potts; Roimata Samuels
- First cousins: Tane Samuels

Wiremu Potae was the teenage nephew of TK Samuels (Benjamin Mitchell). Wiremu arrived alongside his cousin Tane Samuels (Dominic Ona-Ariki) and it was soon clear Wiremu was living in Tane's shadow. However this was cleared up when he climbed the water tank and later dated Harmony (Hetty Gaskell-Hahn) over Tane. In 2008 Wiremu returned with a worn down car and started participating in boy racing to impress Tuesday Warner (Olivia Tennet). However he lost control of the car at high speeds and hit Tane, permanently paralysing him. A devastated Wiremu attempted suicide by alcohol intoxication and later made up with Tane and his family. He departed later in the year to further his music career. In 2009, TK spoke of Wiremu DJing in Australian clubs after having made it big overseas. In 2014 TK suggested Wiremu as a pall-bearer at Sarah Potts' (Amanda Billing) funeral.

In 2022, Cotter hinted at a return to the soap.

== Warren Briggs ==
Warren Briggs
- Shortland Street character
- Portrayed by: Karl Straker
- Duration: 2007, 2010
- First appearance: 13 July 2007
- Last appearance: 2 July 2010
- Introduced by: Jason Daniel (2007); Steven Zanoski (2010)
In-universe information
- Occupation: Ex soldier

Warren Briggs was the drug addicted ex army friend of Scotty (Kiel McNaughton). Warren arrived in 2007 and tried to blackmail Scotty with the death of their friend Greg in exchange for drugs. After being turned down, Warren got himself purposefully mowed down by an ambulance to obtain the drugs. His allegations proved fruitless and he was sent packing. He returned looking for drugs in 2010 but Scotty was shocked to discover Warren's dead body days later in his living room. Weeks later it was revealed Warren was murdered by Penny Rourke (Carolyn Dando) over Greg, her father's, death.

== Lara Wade ==
Lara Wade
- Shortland Street character
- Portrayed by: Anna Henare
- Duration: 2007–08
- First appearance: 15 August 2007
- Last appearance: 12 March 2008
- Introduced by: Jason Daniel
In-universe information
- Occupation: Police officer (until 2008)

Lara Wade was the police office investigating the Ferndale Stranglings. Lara helped Chris (Michael Galvin) through his problems and the two started an affair. Spending months investigating the killings, Lara got herself offside with several members of staff with her aggressive, yet ineffective style of interrogation. When Joey Henderson (Johnny Barker) was revealed as the killer and killed himself, Lara quit her job to pursue a career in psychology.

== Kip Denton ==
Kip Denton
- Shortland Street character
- Portrayed by: Will Hall
- Duration: 2007–09
- First appearance: 22 August 2007
- Last appearance: 16 June 2009
- Introduced by: Jason Daniel
In-universe information
- Occupation: Doctor
- Father: Thomas Denton
- Nephews: Mark Denton; Alex Denton
- Nieces: Poppy Denton

Dr. Kip Denton was the pot smoking doctor who was a past lover of Alice Piper (Toni Potter). Kip's slacker attitude caused tension with Sarah (Amanda Billing) and Craig (Renato Bartolomei) but he was soon warmed to by the staff. Kip fell madly in love with Tania Jeffries (Faye Smythe) but she had an affair with Hone Ropata (Temuera Morrison) and he moved on to Tracey Morrison (Sarah Thomson). Tracey dumped Kip and his feelings for Alice reignited. After struggling with new found responsibilities at work in 2009, he and Alice went to Rarotonga and finally reconciled before quitting their jobs and staying in the country. Later in the year Kip rang TK Samuels (Benjamin Mitchell) to tell him Alice was pregnant.

== Sidney Mitchell ==
Sidney Mitchell
- Shortland Street character
- Portrayed by: Andrew Grainger
- Duration: 2007
- First appearance: 30 August 2007
- Last appearance: 31 August 2007
- Introduced by: Jason Daniel
In-universe information
- Occupation: Teacher
- Wife: Joanne Mitchell (2007—)
- Sons: Kieran Mitchell; Sid Mitchell Jnr; Sean Mitchell

Sidney Mitchell was the estranged father of Kieran Mitchell (Adam Rickitt). He arrived to convince Kieran to return for his wedding. However it was revealed the bride was Joanne, Kieran's ex lover, the reason for the two's estrangement. Kieran forcibly declined and Sidney paid him out before disowning him. In 2010 Kieran claimed Sidney had a heart attack was the reason for his emotional state when it was really the death of Morgan Braithwaite (Bonnie Soper).

== Sunil Kumari ==
Sunil Kumari
- Shortland Street character
- Portrayed by: Monish Anand
- Duration: 2007–2009
- First appearance: 4 September 2007
- Last appearance: 23 October 2009
- Introduced by: Jason Daniel (2007, 2008); Steven Zanoski (2009)
In-universe information
- Father: Naveen Kumari
- Mother: Shobna Kumari
- Sisters: Shanti Kumari; Grishma Kumari; Dipali Kumari
- Uncles: Vijay Kumari
- Aunts: Rani Kumari

Sunil Kumari was the overly protective brother of Shanti Kumari (Nisha Madhan). He was disgusted to learn Shanti was dating Scotty (Kiel McNaughton) and later shared a brief romance with Libby Jeffries (Fleur Saville). Sunil eventually accepted Shanti's romance and even dated Scotty's sister Rebecca (Marise Wipani). However, in 2009 the two had broken up and though it looked like they would reconcile, Sunil was disgusted to learn she was a prostitute. Sunil attended Shanti's funeral and off screen in 2010, blessed Scotty's engagement to Tracey Morrison (Sarah Thomson).

== Gerald Tippett ==
Gerald Tippett
- Shortland Street character
- Portrayed by: Harry McNaughton
- Duration: 2007–10, 2012
- First appearance: 7 September 2007
- Last appearance: 28 May 2012
- Introduced by: Jason Daniel (2007); Steven Zanoski (2012)
In-universe information
- Occupation: Receptionist at Shortland Street Hospital (2007–10)
- Father: Nigel Tippett
- Mother: Katie Tippett
- Wife: Morgan Braithwaite (2009); Libby Jeffries (2010—)

Gerald Tippett was the flamboyant receptionist at the hospital. He replaced the murdered Claire Solomon (Emily Robins) and quickly got on the bad side of fellow receptionist Yvonne (Alison Quigan). The two soon became good friends and Gerald's flatmate Kieran (Adam Rickitt) encouraged Gerald to explore his sexuality. Despite experimenting with other men, Gerald became convinced he was straight but also asexual, meaning he had no sexual feeling but has romantic attraction towards women. He began to date Morgan Braithwaite (Bonnie Soper) and the two married so that Morgan's children would have stable parents. Morgan gave the children away however and the two separated. Morgan died and Gerald ended up marrying best friend Libby Jeffries (Fleur Saville) so that she could have a green card into the United States and the two departed there to live. The two returned for Yvonne's (Alison Quigan) birthday in 2012 but a minor cold soon escalated and Gerald's heart ended up failing. He was forced to undergo heart surgery and whilst healing decided his and Libby's marriage was over. However the two reconciled and departed happily together with his wife accepting his asexuality.

== Luke Durville ==
Dr. Luke Durville was the eccentric anaethesist who was a suspect in the Ferndale Stranglings. Following his first appearance in September 2007, Gerald Urquhart portrayed the character for multiple sporadic stints before becoming a regular character in 2012.

== Jay Jeffries ==
Jay Jeffries
- Shortland Street character
- Portrayed by: Emma Lewandowski (2007); Jane Lewandowski (2007); Jack Boyle (2007); Tom Boyle (2007); Marlan Nesbitt (2008); Liam Farmer (2008–12)
- Duration: 2007–12
- First appearance: 8 October 2007
- Last appearance: 28 May 2012
- Introduced by: Jason Daniel (2007); Steven Zanoski (2012)
In-universe information
- Father: Mark Weston
- Mother: Maia Jeffries
- Stepmother: Jay Copeland
- Grandfathers: Ian Jeffries; Dave Weston
- Grandmothers: Yvonne Jeffries; Julia Weston
- Uncles: Hamish Flynn
- Aunts: Libby Jeffries; Tania Jeffries
- First cousins: Peter Flynn; Amber Flynn

Jay "Jay-Jay" Jeffries was the son of Maia Jeffries (Anna Jullienne). Jay was conceived from Maia's sister Tania's (Faye Smythe) husband – Mark's (Tim Foley) sperm, a move that destroyed the Jeffries family when it was uncovered. Jay was born in a traffic jam in central Auckland in October 2007 and was named after his mothers ex-wife Jessica "Jay" Copeland (Jaime Passier-Armstrong). In 2008 the Jeffries realised Maia's lack of love towards Jay and she revealed he had been diagnosed with Kennedy's disease as she had feared. Jay went missing under Tania's care in 2009 and it was revealed Maia had taken him after suffering a mental breakdown. Jay left alongside Maia and his grandmother, Yvonne (Alison Quigan) in early 2011 to live in Australia. Jay returned in 2012 alongside Maia and Yvonne en route to Yvonne's birthday celebration.

== Tracey Morrison ==
Tracey Morrison
- Shortland Street character
- Portrayed by: Sarah Thomson
- Duration: 2007, 2008–11
- First appearance: 24 October 2007
- Last appearance: 11 August 2011
- Introduced by: Jason Daniel (2007, 2008)
In-universe information
- Occupation: Nurse at Shortland Street (2008–11); Police officer (until 2007)
- Father: Gordon Morrison
- Mother: Kate Morrison
- Brothers: David Morrison; Doug Morrison; Peter Morrison
- Husband: James "Scotty" Scott (2011—)
- Adoptive sons: Kitu Scott

Tracey Morrison appeared for four years as both a guest and regular character. She arrived to the hospital in October and Scotty (Kiel McNaughton) was sceptical at her nursing ability. She dated Joey Henderson (Johnny Barker) and Gavin Capper (Tim Schijf) but when it was unintentionally revealed she was an undercover cop, her unconscious body was found in the garbage dump - after having nearly fallen victim to the Ferndale Strangler she had been investigating. She returned the following year deeply traumatised by her kidnapping but having retrained as a nurse. She started to date Kip Denton (Will Hall) but her paranoia resulted in her stabbing a man who was stalking her and her relationship with Kip broke down. She rebounded with both Tai Scott (Xavier Horan) and Maxwell Avia (Robbie Magasiva), but his gambling problems got in the way and she briefly dated Hunter McKay (Lee Donoghue) before falling in love with Scotty. After he recovered from a brain tumour, the two married and tried for kids through IVF treatment. They adopted a boy named Kitu (Christian Edmonds) and Tracey fell pregnant shortly before they moved to East Timor in August 2011.

In 2012 Sarah Potts (Amanda Billing) announced that the two had given birth to a baby daughter and the couple soon sold their house to Luke Durville (Gerald Urquhart).

== Darcy Thomas ==
Darcy Thomas
- Shortland Street character
- Portrayed by: Todd Morgan
- Duration: 2007
- First appearance: April 2007
- Last appearance: December 2007
- Introduced by: Libby Jeffries
In-universe information
- Occupation: Scottspear Representative

Darcy Thomas was the catalyst for the downfall of Ant and Tanya’s relationship. Set up on a blind date with Libby, Darcy set to work sabotaging Ant’s relationship and career.
