= List of Shortland Street characters introduced in 2011 =

The following is a list of characters that first appeared in the New Zealand soap opera Shortland Street in 2011, by order of first appearance.

== Peter Morrison ==
Peter Morrison
- Shortland Street character
- Portrayed by: Phil Pinner
- Duration: 2011
- First appearance: 17 January 2011
- Last appearance: 21 January 2011
- Introduced by: Steven Zanoski
In-universe information
- Father: Gordon Morrison
- Mother: Kate Morrison
- Brothers: David Morrison; Doug Morrison
- Sisters: Tracey Morrison

Peter Morrison was Tracey's (Sarah Thomson) second oldest brother. He arrived in January 2011 when he learned Tracey's fiance – Scotty (Kiel McNaughton) had viciously attacked her. He encouraged her to end it with Scotty and ended up leaving back to the United Kingdom when Scotty was diagnosed with a brain tumour.

== Roimata Ngatai ==
Roimata Ngatai was the young Maori nurse who fell for TK Samuels (Benjamin Mitchell). Despite initially being a minor character, the character got a positive reception and soon was one of the central characters in the soaps 2011 feature-length episode.

== Jill Kingsbury ==
Jill Kingsbury
- Shortland Street character
- Portrayed by: Natalie Medlock
- Duration: 2011–12
- First appearance: 3 February 2011
- Last appearance: 16 January 2012
- Introduced by: Steven Zanoski
In-universe information
- Occupation: Nurse at Shortland Street (2011)

Jill Kingsbury was the "Beautiful, energetic and outgoing" nurse who was best friends with Roimata Ngatai (Shavaughn Ruakere). The character was axed in late 2011.

Jill arrived in February. She had previously dated Daniel Potts (Ido Drent) whilst overseas and planned to win him back but with Sophie's (Kimberley Crossman) intervention, she ended up with Hunter McKay (Lee Donoghue). Hunter however slept with Paige Munroe (Rachel Foreman) and it turned out Jill had spent time in prison for armed robbery and assault. The presence of her ex-boyfriend – Regan Ames (George Mason), who had caused her to go to prison, made Jill drift towards Hunter's middle aged father, Callum McKay (Peter Mochrie). The relationship was highly controversial and many, including Hunter, suspected Jill of being after Callum's money. Jill and Callum soon realised Hunter had a serious drug problem and when Jill and Daniel confronted him whilst he robbed a pharmacy, Jill was fatally stabbed accidentally by a security guard.

== Lars Hammett ==
Lars Hammett
- Shortland Street character
- Portrayed by: Seán O'Connor
- Duration: 2011
- First appearance: 2 March 2011
- Last appearance: 4 March 2011
- Introduced by: Steven Zanoski
In-universe information
- Occupation: Researcher
- Wife: Nadia Hammett (until 2011)

Dr. Lars Hammett was an internationally renowned researcher who attended the research conference where Brooke Freeman (Beth Allen) was trying to boost her profile. Lars offered Brooke the property of one of his defining researches if she slept with him, however he collapsed and died of a heart attack before he could willingly hand over the papers. Brooke stole them whilst her boyfriend, Isaac Worthington (Matt Minto) distracted the police.

== Henare Ngatai ==
Henare Ngatai
- Shortland Street character
- Portrayed by: George Henare
- Duration: 2011–12
- First appearance: 17 March 2011
- Last appearance: 7 May 2012
- Introduced by: Steven Zanoski (2011, 2012)
In-universe information
- Occupation: Doctor
- Wife: Ruth Ngatai (1983—)
- Daughters: Roimata Samuels
- Nieces: Anne Ngatai; Jennifer Ngatai

Dr. Henare Ngatai was the nationally renowned doctor and father of Roimata (Shavaughn Ruakere). Henare arrived in March and took an instant liking to Roimata's new boyfriend – TK Samuels (Benjamin Mitchell). Henare returned in July to attend the couple's wedding with his wife Ruth (Christina Asher). Roimata caught Henare flirting with Brooke Freeman (Beth Allen) and publicly announced that Henare had once cheated on Ruth. Henare returned in March 2012 and recruited TK to join him in a Maori healthcare initiative. However it was soon clear Henare was up to no good and it turned out he was embezzling funds from the ministry to fund his own private clinic. Henare ended up in court and disowned by his family. However Roimata and Ruth eventually forgave him amongst abandonment from his whanau. The following year Ruth revealed that Henare had gotten away with no charge and had set about recovering his lost reputation. In 2014, Henare and Ruth arrived to Ferndale off screen to collect the body of Roimata, who had died in an explosion.

== Paige Munroe ==
Paige Munroe
- Shortland Street character
- Portrayed by: Rachel Foreman
- Duration: 2011–12
- First appearance: 4 April 2011
- Last appearance: 15 October 2012
- Introduced by: Steven Zanoski (2011, 2012)
In-universe information
- Uncles: Shane Tucker

Paige Munroe was Hunter McKay's (Lee Donoghue) medical school rival. Paige had been raised by her uncle Shane Tucker (Jason Hood) and as a result of ruthless and determined. She and Hunter got an intern placement at Shortland Street and Hunter soon realised Paige was on ADHD medication. Paige started to date Daniel Potts (Ido Drent) but the two broke up when she slept with Hunter. Paige lured Hunter onto the pills but it was soon clear Paige was addicted. She sought help from Daniel but Shane soon realised his niece was a drug addict. He tried to cover it up to save his career but only ended up breaking more laws. Paige was eventually sent to rehab away from Ferndale.

In May 2012 after months of rumours, it was confirmed Paige would be returning to the show that month. Paige returned in May and regained her internship in an attempt to apologise to Hunter's father Callum (Peter Mochrie). She briefly dated Josh Gallagher (Chris Tempest) before she departed due to the stress of surgery.

== Alan Woodstock ==
Alan Woodstock
- Shortland Street character
- Portrayed by: Grae Burton
- Duration: 2011
- First appearance: 4 April 2011
- Last appearance: 6 April 2011
- Introduced by: Steven Zanoski
In-universe information
- Occupation: General Practitioner at Shortland Street Hospital (until 2011)

Dr. Alan Woodstock was the alcoholic doctor who worked at the hospital's GP clinic. In a bid to mask her feelings for Murray Cooper (Matthew Chamberlain), Vasa Levi (Teuila Blakely) accepted a date with Alan and although she didn't enjoy it, continued to see him to avoid Murray. However it was soon evident Alan had a serious drinking problem and when Vasa rejected his advances, he forced himself on her, only to be stopped by Murray, who Alan knocked out. Alan was later suspended from the hospital pending investigation and later fired.

== Winston Youn ==
Winston Youn
- Shortland Street character
- Portrayed by: Min Kim
- Duration: 2011
- First appearance: 8 April 2011
- Last appearance: 12 October 2011
- Introduced by: Steven Zanoski
In-universe information
- Mother: Emily Youn

Winston Youn was the obsessive research assistant to Brooke Freeman (Beth Allen). Brooke warmed to Winston quickly but it soon was revealed Winston was stalkerishly obsessed with Brooke and had been following her for the past 2 years. Winston reunited Brooke with her mother Annette Freeman (Louise Wallace), who revealed Winston was their maids son from when Brooke was a child. However Winston's obsessive nature grew even more and he developed an unrequited crush on Brooke. Matters were only made worse when Brooke suspected Winston had murdered Nadia (Jessi Williams) for her. Winston grew jealous of Brooke's boyfriend Alex (Bede Skinner) and tried to separate them. Things came to a head when Brooke tried to kill Winston by running him over and it was revealed Winston had not killed Nadia but was trying to protect Brooke. He got a job overseas but returned the next month to convince Brooke to alter her research project illegally. He decided to become a nurse and started to become obsessed with Vasa Levi (Teuila Blakely) before he decided to move overseas, relieving Brooke.

== Regan Ames ==
Regan Ames
- Shortland Street character
- Portrayed by: George Mason
- First appearance: 15 April 2011
- Last appearance: 7 July 2011
- Introduced by: Steven Zanoski
In-universe information
- First cousins: Logan Ames

Regan Ames was the criminal ex-boyfriend of Jill Kingsbury (Natalie Medlock). He arrived in Ferndale in an attempt to reconcile with Jill and ended up getting a job at The I.V. and flatting with Jill. In a sick attempt to steal Jill from her boyfriend Hunter (Lee Donoghue), Regan pretended he was terminally ill – although, ironically, he had experienced a genuine cancer scare the previous year – and when Brodie (Ari Boyland) began researching him, Regan set him up with class A drugs and got drug lords onto him. When Regan learned Callum McKay (Peter Mochrie) had come into possession of a large sum of money, he stole it through computer hacking and fled Ferndale. Callum tracked him down and the two managed to free Jill from being kidnapped by drug lords before Callum forced Regan to hand himself in.

== Holden Smith ==
Holden Smith
- Shortland Street character
- Portrayed by: Rudi Vodanovich
- Duration: 2011, 2013
- First appearance: 27 April 2011
- Last appearance: 22 January 2013
- Introduced by: Steven Zanoski (2011, 2013)
In-universe information
- Occupation: Nightclub DJ

Holden Smith was an associate of Regan Ames' (George Mason). Holden delivered stolen goods to Regan and began to make trouble at 'The IV' bar. He caught the attention of teenager, Ula Levi (Frankie Adams) and the two started to date. Ula's father – Maxwell (Robbie Magasiva) found out and discovered Holden was providing Ula with alcohol illegally. When Maxwell left New Zealand, Holden visited Ula and attempted to rape her when she declined him sex. He continued to intimidate her in public for several more weeks. In July Holden and several gang members kidnapped Jill (Natalie Medlock) when Regan refused to give them money over a drug trade problem. Callum (Peter Mochrie) ended up saving Jill and getting the gang arrested.

Holden returned two years later when Jasmine (Pearl McGlashan) took advantage of him to secure alcohol underage.

== Owen Sutherland ==
Owen Sutherland
- Shortland Street character
- Portrayed by: Benedict Wall
- Duration: 2011
- First appearance: 2 June 2011
- Last appearance: 19 July 2011
- Introduced by: Steven Zanoski
In-universe information
- Occupation: ED consultant

Dr. Owen Sutherland was the intense rival of TK Samuels (Benjamin Mitchell). The two had attended med school together and Owen took out a personal vendetta against TK for being better than him. Upon arriving in June, Owen made TK's life hell and started invading all aspects of his life, including flirting with TK's ex-wife – Sarah (Amanda Billing), forcing himself into organising his wedding and his work life. Owen even invited himself to TK's stag party and sabotaged it so that TK would be left in his underwear chained to a pole overnight. Owen confessed to Sarah he had been in a drunk driving crash and possibly mentally damaged. TK snapped and assaulted Owen, who later helped Sarah give birth to his daughter Matilda Potts (Nathan Anderson). Owen eventually apologised to TK and confessed he was not as bad as he once thought, he then quit and left Ferndale.

== Suzy McRae ==
Suzy McRae
- Shortland Street character
- Portrayed by: Maisie McSwiney
- Duration: 2011
- First appearance: 9 June 2011
- Last appearance: 2 September 2011
- Introduced by: Steven Zanoski
In-universe information
- Father: Ned McRae

Suzy McRae was Brian's (Ian Mune) farmgirl neighbour. She met Phoenix (Geordie Holibar) when he came to visit a distressed Brian and she revealed Brian had taken potshots at her farm and was possibly having a breakdown. She grew close to Phoenix and ended up taking his virginity in Brian's barn. She arrived on a school trip to Ferndale months later, infuriating Phoenix's girlfriend Jasmine (Pearl McGlashan). Suzy attempted to get together with Phoenix and after forcing herself into his birthday party, returned to Southland.

== Nadia Hammett ==
Nadia Hammett
- Shortland Street character
- Portrayed by: Jessi Williams
- Duration: 2011
- First appearance: 13 June 2011
- Last appearance: 20 June 2011
- Introduced by: Steven Zanoski
In-universe information
- Occupation: Doctor
- Husband: Lars Hammett (until 2011)

Dr. Nadia Hammett was the meddling wife of deceased doctor Lars Hammett (Sean O'Connor). Nadia suspected Brooke Freeman (Beth Allen) of stealing her husband's research and eventually found enough evidence to convict her. However, when Brooke's assistant – Winston (Min Kim) learned of this, Nadia mysteriously went missing. Brooke later found out Nadia had died in a horrific car crash. She suspected Winston of murdering her but in truth discovered Winston had witnessed the crash and was acting strangely as he was traumatised.

== Lana Jacobs ==
Lana Jacobs
- Shortland Street character
- Portrayed by: Brooke Williams
- Duration: 2011–13
- First appearance: 11 July 2011
- Last appearance: 7 March 2013
- Introduced by: Steven Zanoski
In-universe information
- Occupation: Personal assistant
- Sisters: Gabrielle Jacobs

Lana Jacobs first appeared in mid 2011, portrayed by Brooke Williams. In 2012, Williams opted not to sign a contract renewal and filmed her final scenes in December. Lana was the estranged sister of Gabrielle Jacobs (Virginie Le Brun) and potential love interest for Daniel Potts (Ido Drent). Lana arrived and was fazed to find her sister working at the hospital. The two eventually reconciled after Lana won a job as Callum McKay's (Peter Mochrie) personal assistant. Lana and Daniel eventually began to date when he suffered head trauma in early 2012 but broke up shortly afterwards. Lana shocked all when she began to date female nurse Nicole (Sally Martin), but the relationship did not last. Lana soon briefly dated Josh Gallagher (Chris Tempest) and caused unrest in the hospital when she and her two best friends, Emma (Amy Usherwood) and Kylie (Kerry-Lee Dewing), accused new doctor Boyd Rolleston (Sam Bunkall) of being a murderer. In 2013 Lana purchased a house with her two best friends but accepted an opportunity of a lifetime relating to her fashion designing dreams – causing her to leave for the job in Australia. In late 2014, Kylie announced that Lana had decided to sell her share of the house.

== Angkasa Tuatakitoa ==
Angkasa Tuatakitoa
- Shortland Street character
- Portrayed by: Hweiling Ow
- Duration: 2011
- Appears on: 11 July 2011
- Introduced by: Steven Zanoski
In-universe information
- Sons: Kitu Scott

Angkasa Tuatakitoa was Scotty's (Kiel McNaughton) ex lover whom he met up with again during his honeymoon in early 2011. Scotty learned later in the year that she had been involved in a serious fire and he quickly paid for her to come to New Zealand for expensive surgery. Scotty's wife Tracey Morrison (Sarah Thomson) suspected they were having an affair and when Angkasa suddenly died from previously undiscovered cancer, all were shocked when a note named Scotty as her young son Kitu's (Christian Edmonds) father.

== Kitu Scott ==
Kitu Scott
- Shortland Street character
- Portrayed by: Christian Edmonds
- Duration: 2011
- First appearance: 11 July 2011
- Last appearance: 11 August 2011
- Introduced by: Steven Zanoski
In-universe information
- Mother: Angkasa
- Adoptive father: James Scott
- Adoptive mother: Tracey Morrison
- Grandfathers: Jimmy Scott (adoptive); Gordon Morrison (adoptive)
- Grandmothers: Hine Ryan (adoptive); Kate Morrison (adoptive)
- Uncles: David Morrison (adoptive); Peter Morrison (adoptive); Doug Morrison (adoptive); Patrick Scott (adoptive)
- Aunts: Rebecca Scott (adoptive)
- First cousins: Jessie Scott (adoptive); Amy Scott (adoptive)

Kitu Scott was the young son of Angkasa (Hweiling Ow). Following Angkasa's death, he was named as Scotty's (Kiel McNaughton) son but a DNA test proved they were unrelated. Scotty and his wife Tracey Morrison (Sarah Thomson) decided to return him to his auntie, but eventually warmed to the boy and adopted him. In August the family moved to East Timor with the news Tracey was pregnant.

== Ruth Ngatai ==
Ruth Ngatai
- Shortland Street character
- Portrayed by: Christina Asher
- Duration: 2011, 2012, 2013
- First appearance: 15 July 2011
- Last appearance: 18 March 2013
- Introduced by: Steven Zanoski (2011, 2012); Simon Bennett (2013)
In-universe information
- Husband: Henare Ngatai (1983—)
- Daughters: Roimata Samuels
- Nieces: Anne Ngatai; Jennifer Ngatai

Ruth Ngatai was the mother of Roimata (Shavaughn Ruakere). She arrived in July 2011 to attend her daughters wedding to TK Samuels (Benjamin Mitchell) and insisted to Roimata that she had forgiven her husband – Henare (George Henare) for cheating. TK visited Ruth in April 2012 and was shocked to learn she knew Henare had been embezzling funds. Roimata later disowned her parents. However following Henares charges being dropped, they reconciled. Ruth visited Roimata in early 2013 and was shocked to hear she had been mugged when in reality she had been sexually assaulted. In 2014, Henare and Ruth arrived to Ferndale off screen to collect the body of Roimata, who had died in an explosion.

== Matilda Potts ==
Tillie Samuels
- Shortland Street character
- Portrayed by: Nathan Anderson (2011); Nalani Rose Tuhoe (2011–12); Leila Eketone (2012–17); Tinihuia Lee-Lemon (2019–2023)
- Duration: 2011–2017, 2019–2023
- First appearance: 18 July 2011
- Last appearance: 23 June 2023
- Introduced by: Steven Zanoski
In-universe information
- Father: TK Samuels
- Mother: Sarah Potts
- Half-brothers: Daniel Potts
- Half-sisters: Gia Te Atakura
- Grandfathers: Morgan Potts; Apirana Wira
- Grandmothers: Pam Potts; Liz Arthur
- Other relatives: Esther Samuels; Mareikura Samuels; Huia Samuels; Anahera Samuels; Wiremu Potae

Matilda Mareikura "Tillie" Samuels is the daughter of Sarah Potts (Amanda Billing) and TK Samuels (Benjamin Mitchell) who was born in mid-2011. Tillie was originally portrayed by baby boy – Nathan Anderson but the baby started to grow much more masculine and European looking than producers wanted and Nalani Rose Tuhoe was cast to replace him. Growing up on-screen, in 2022 she was part of a group of teenagers on the show who as a "posse" featured in predominantly youth-based storylines.

Born on the roadside whilst Sarah travelled to TK's wedding with Roimata Ngatai (Shavaugn Ruakere), she was named after a waitress who worked at a restaurant Tillie's grandmother – Pam (Teresa Woodham) dined at. In September 2013 Sarah accidentally reversed over her in a truck after she crawled into the driveway. Despite severe injury, Tillie received surgery and survived. The following year, controversy erupted at the hospital when receptionist Leanne Miller (Jennifer Ludlam) smacked her whilst babysitting. In August 2014, Tillie was left without a mother when Sarah fell victim to a deadly illness. Tillie grew close to TK's partner Kylie (Kerry-Lee Dewing), acting as a mother-figure. In 2017 TK permitted Tillie to live with the Samuels Whanau away from Ferndale due to the angst he was suffering deeming him unfit to act as parent, having murdered Hayden Crowhurt (Aaron Jackson).

Tillie returned to Ferndale and TK's custody in December 2019, quickly adjusting to life as a teenager. In 2021 she developed a rebellious streak and narrowly avoided death in a car crash that killed the teenage driver. Developing a mutual crush on Wilder Mullens (Felix Jones), she rebuffed a kiss and he fell, sustaining a severe eye injury. Under questioning, Tillie claimed she pushed him as he was acting without consent, though later retracted her accusation. Picking up an interest in Kapa Haka, Tillie fell for one of her fellow students and later began sleeping with him, much to TK's anger. Falling into a bad crowd at school, one of Tillie's associates Milo Cross (Ben Porter) assaulted TK and Tillie took part in a ram raid, leading TK to send her away from Ferndale.

A 2012 scene that saw Brooke Freeman (Beth Allen) awkwardly attempt to sing a Māori lullaby to Tillie, was voted by fans as the top moment of the season.

== Alexander Murphy ==
Alexander Murphy
- Shortland Street character
- Portrayed by: Bede Skinner
- Duration: 2011
- First appearance: 5 August 2011
- Last appearance: 3 December 2011
- Introduced by: Steven Zanoski

Dr. Alexander Murphy was Brooke's (Beth Allen) high school sweet heart and the auditor for her research project. Brooke was initially displeased to see Alex as her auditor but when the two discussed their dating in 1999 they discovered their break up was a misunderstanding and the two reconciled. Winston (Min Kim) strove to drive the two apart and successfully broke them up when he told of Brooke's many conquests. However the two got back together and successfully drove Winston from the country. Alex proposed and bought a house for the two but when he learned Brooke had stolen her research project, he was appalled and broke it off, before selling the house and fleeing Ferndale.

== Bailey Finch ==
Bailey Finch
- Shortland Street character
- Portrayed by: Estevez Gillespie
- Duration: 2011–12
- First appearance: 17 August 2011
- Last appearance: 22 May 2012
- Introduced by: Steven Zanoski
In-universe information
- Occupation: Drug dealer

Bailey Finch was Hunter's (Lee Donoghue) drug dealer and fellow junkie. Hunter helped Bailey receive morphine in exchange for pills but later Bailey encouraged Hunter to use speed. By the end of the year, Hunter started living at Bailey's drug house and the two became burglars. The two decided to rob a pharmacy and when Daniel (Ido Drent) confronted the two, Bailey bludgeoned him with a crowbar, giving him long term brain damage. He also tried to stab Jill (Natalie Medlock) before fleeing. Hunter's father Callum (Peter Mochrie) later tracked Bailey down, only for Bailey to escape and Callum to find Hunter had overdosed. It was later announced Bailey was in rehab, only to return in May 2012 in a drug seeking attempt. However, after stealing drugs and running from the hospital doctors, Bailey ended up on the roof and caused a helicopter crash. He later nearly died from an overdose which resulted in Callum nearly getting fired.

== Zlata Dobra ==
Zlata Dobra
- Shortland Street character
- Portrayed by: Kate Elliott
- Duration: 2011, 2013
- First appearance: 25 August 2011
- Last appearance: 3 June 2013
- Introduced by: Steven Zanoski (2011); Simon Bennett (2013)
In-universe information
- Other names: Zlata Antonescu (birth name); Zlata Waldheim
- Occupation: Receptionist at Shortland Street Hospital (2011, 2013)
- Father: Costel Waldheim
- Mother: Stella Waldheim
- Sisters: Edina Waldheim
- Sons: Luca Dobra
- Uncles: Alda Waldheim

Zlata Dobra (née Antonescu, previously Waldheim) was pitched as "Luke's [Durville] (Gerald Urquhart) perfect idea of a vampire bride". Rachel Blampied auditioned for the role of Zlata but was turned down and the role of Bree Hamilton was written specially for her. In August 2011 it was announced acclaimed actress Kate Elliott would be joining Shortland Street later in the month. Elliott was pleased to get the role, saying; "I've always wanted to be on the show – I watched it religiously as a kid – and I'm so grateful for the opportunity". Upon her arrival, it was announced Zlata was a love interest for established character, Luke Durville. The character was written as subtly comedic which Elliott praised, saying: "I get a lot of gothic, vampiric roles but this is funny. The writers have done a really good job." Producer Steven Zanoski was surprised that a high calibre actor such as Elliott auditioned but was impressed by her convincing Romanian accent and the way she picked up on the character's funny nuances. He stated; "It was interesting to watch her transform herself from this very affable and collegial actor into this crazy Eastern European woman." The character was set to be on screen for 4 months and cause a stir upon arrival. Zlata made her last appearance in December, with Elliott highly enjoying the role after initially struggling with the heavy and quick work load. In 2013, Elliott reprised the role for a guest stint that lasted a month.

Zlata arrived in August and shocked the hospital staff when she announced her engagement to oddball, Luke Durville. However many suspected she was after his money when she began to change his appearance and showed little affection. However it soon transpired that Zlata was truly in love but Luke had fallen for his best friend, Bella Cooper (Amelia Reid). Falling the revelation, Zlata's criminal father Costel (Phil Peloton) attempted to murder Bella and the two returned to Romania. Zlata made a shock reappearance in April 2013 and announced the birth of her and Luke's son, Luca (Charlie Truman), only to discover her ex-fiance had died. Zlata showed little affection for her soon and she was diagnosed with post-natal depression. Desperate for Luke's inheritance from Bella, Zlata agreed to marry her in a civil union but soon came round to loving Luca and departed Ferndale.

== Bethany Hall ==
Bethany Hall
- Shortland Street character
- Portrayed by: Michelle Langstone
- First appearance: 29 September 2011
- Last appearance: 4 November 2011
- Introduced by: Steven Zanoski
In-universe information
- Occupation: Emergency department consultant

Dr. Bethany Hall was an Australian doctor who Maxwell (Robbie Magasiva) worked with while on a conference. Maxwell's girlfriend Nicole (Sally Martin) suspected the two had an affair and when Bethany showed up in Ferndale the speculation only grew. Maxwell confessed nothing happened but Bethany showed interest and started invading both Maxwell's personal and professional lives. Bethany eventually lured Maxwell into bed and tried to take him back to Australia. Maxwell declined her and confessed to Nicole his mistake. Bethany left disappointed.

== Seth Packhurst ==
Seth Packhurst
- Shortland Street character
- Portrayed by: Toby Leach
- Duration: 2011–13
- First appearance: 5 October 2011
- Last appearance: 8 July 2013
- Introduced by: Steven Zanoski
In-universe information
- Occupation: chief executive officer of St. Catherines Hospital (2013); DHB representative (until 2013)

Seth Packhurst^{1} first appeared in late 2011 in a guest role. He was the District Health Board member who replaced Shane Tucker (Jason Hood) as the hospital's representative. He first appeared when Chris Warner (Michael Galvin) demonstrated remote surgery disastrously. In 2012 Seth became temporary CEO after suspending Rachel McKenna (Angela Bloomfield) but after trying to fire Bree (Rachel Blampied), he began to get blackmailed by her. Sarah Potts (Amanda Billing) angrily confronted Seth when she believed he was pretending to date her, only to discover he was gay and in the following few months, the two became best friends. Seth became involved in a bitter political battle with Rachel for the CEO position of the hospital, which eventuated in Seth using his boyfriend Henry (Peter Huang) to spy for him. Seth eventually ousted Rachel from the position but in his attempts to privatise the hospital, he became involved in insider trading and was handed into police by Rachel through Henry's help.

Seth was planned to be gay for several months before the revelation was actually written and as such, directors were informed not to have Seth flirting with any female characters. Leach pointed out a continuity error however, when Seth was seen romancing a woman in one of his early scenes.

== Tom Stanton ==
Tom Stanton
- Shortland Street character
- Portrayed by: Henry Beasley
- Duration: 2011–12
- First appearance: 28 October 2011
- Last appearance: 19 June 2012
- Introduced by: Steven Zanoski
In-universe information
- Brothers: Matt Stanton
- Sons: Adam Vailalo

Tom Stanton was the artistic new boy at Ferndale High that quickly caught the eye of Ula Levi (Frankie Adams). The two soon began dating after disapproval from Ula's parents as Tom was flatting with his brother and not in a stable home. Tom pressured Ula into sex and Evan (Tyler Read) suspected Tom was cheating on Ula. In mid December, Ula was horrified to learn she was pregnant with Tom's baby. She broke the news to Tom in January and they agreed to raise the child together however Ula later learned that Tom had fled Ferndale with his brother. Tom returned later in the year and happily began dating Ula again to sponge off her pregnancy benefit. He also began to steal Phoenix's (Geordie Holibar) money and when Ula's mother Vasa (Teuila Blakely) paid him to keep the baby, he ended up fleeing to Australia with the cash.

== Costel Antonescu ==
Costel Waldheim
- Shortland Street character
- Portrayed by: Phil Peleton
- Duration: 2011
- First appearance: 7 November 2011
- Last appearance: 6 December 2011
- Introduced by: Steven Zanoski
In-universe information
- Brothers: Alda Waldheim
- Wife: Stella Dobra
- Daughters: Zlata Dobra; Edina Waldheim
- Grandsons: Luca Dobra

Costel Waldheim (née Antonescu) was Zlata's Kate Elliott disturbed father. Zlata's fiance Luke Durville (Gerald Urquhart), suspected Costel of being dead and was shocked when Costel arrived to prepare for the couple's wedding. It was soon clear Costel was extremely violent however when he attacked and threatened Daniel Potts (Ido Drent), and molested Bella Cooper (Amelia Reid). When Costel discovered Luke had fallen in love with Bella, he attempted to torture and murder her at Zlata's hens party, only to be discovered and arrested. In 2013 Zlata informed the Coopers that Costel had been imprisoned.

== Bree Hamilton ==
Dr. Bree Hamilton was the illegitimate half sister of Brooke Freeman (Beth Allen). Although it originally seemed Bree was a lot nicer than Brooke, this turned out not to be the case.

== Notes ==
- ^Note 1 Seth was credited with the surname "Pankhurst" until mid-2012.
