= Roimata Ngatai =

- Shortland Street character
- Portrayed by: Shavaughn Ruakere
- Duration: 2011–2014, 2023
- First appearance: 26 January 2011
- Last appearance: 23 June 2023
- Introduced by: Steven Zanoski (2011); Oliver Driver (2023)
In-universe information
- Other names: Roimata Samuels (married name)
- Occupation: Nurse at Shortland Street (2011–2013)
- Father: Henare Ngatai
- Mother: Ruth Ngatai
- Husband: TK Samuels (2011-2014)
- Stepdaughters: Tillie Potts
- First cousins: Jennifer Ngatai; Anne Ngatai

Roimata Ngatai (also Samuels) is a fictional character on the New Zealand soap opera Shortland Street, who was portrayed by Shavaughn Ruakere from January 2011 to January 2014. Initially introduced as a 3-month love interest for TK Samuels (Benjamin Mitchell), Ruakere's contract was extended to a regular role.

Initially pitched to be of European descent, under the suggestion of the show's Māori adviser, the character was rewritten to be a fluent Te Reo speaking Maori. Roimata arrived to the show in early 2011 as part of a double act with fellow new character, Jill Kingsbury (Natalie Medlock). Used as a focal point for the TK and Sarah Potts (Amanda Billing) love triangle, the 2011 Winter Season climaxed with TK's and Roimata aborted wedding. Roimata's following story lines saw her support her criminal father, become a victim of sexual assault, end her marriage after having an affair with Josh Gallagher (Chris Tempest), and ultimately die as the result of an explosion in the 2013 Christmas cliffhanger.

The character of Roimata was praised alongside Ruakere's acting. The 2012 sexual assault storyline was also singled out by many reviewers as not only a highlight of the show's 20th year, but also a true and emotionally stimulating storyline.

== Creation and casting ==
Following the temporary departure of the Sarah Potts (Amanda Billing) character in late 2010, producers decided to create a new love interest for TK Samuels (Benjamin Mitchell) so as to create a love triangle upon Sarah's ultimate return. Originally the character was set to be of European descent however Māori adviser, Ngamaru Raerino fought with writers until they wrote the character as a good looking Māori who could speak the native language fluently. The character was given a screen time of 6 months to play out the storyline before departing. Television presenter Shavaughn Ruakere landed the role and stated, "It's really exciting for me. I'm soaking it all up and loving it." She described joining Shortland Street as a step forward in the right direction for her career. The character was written alongside another new nurse, Jill Kingsbury (Natalie Medlock) and a double act was established between the two characters. Roimata made her debut on the episode airing, 26 January 2011 with the line, "Kia Ora, I'm from the bureau". As the characters 6-month duration came to an end, producers acknowledged their enjoyment of Ruakere's portrayal and the extent of story lines it opened up; they subsequently extended her contract to a regular role. In April 2013, producers offered Ruakere a 1-year renewal to her contract, to which she declined in favor of moving overseas to find work. She agreed to stay on the show for several months so that Roimata could get properly written off. The character was killed off in the 2013 Christmas cliffhanger. Ruakere was happy Roimata was killed off in such a dramatic way, stating, "Yup, all good'. Nothing like a big exit!"

== Storylines ==
Roimata arrived to Shortland Street in early 2011 as a temporary bureau nurse and quickly caught the attention of ED doctor, TK Samuels (Benjamin Mitchell). After Roimata's initial refusal, the two began to date but the shock return of TK's pregnant estranged wife Sarah (Amanda Billing), lead to the couple hastily becoming engaged. TK ended up ditching Roimata on the wedding day but the following week, the two married in an unofficial ceremony on the Bay of Islands. The following year Roimata was shocked to discover her father Henare (George Henare) had been embezzling funds under TK's name, yet lent her support to him in court. The couple decided to try for a baby, but following Roimata's birthday party, she was sexually assaulted in a dark alleyway and then continuously harassed in her own home. Josh Gallagher (Chris Tempest) supported her through the ordeal and helped unmask Zac Smith (Mike Edward) as the culprit. Roimata ended up falling for Josh and the two began an affair that ended her marriage to TK. Roimata decided to leave Ferndale but was talked into continuing her nursing studies. However, she soon discovered that Josh had lost his mind and was deliberately making people sick so as to heal them. After failing to get him charged, Roimata tried to stop Josh only to become involved in a dramatic explosion he planned at the staff Christmas function. Roimata was initially saved after Josh sacrificed his life, but ultimately ended up dying from her injuries on the operating table. In 2023, Roimata, Sarah and Mo Hannah would appear to TK in spirit form, willing him back to life after he'd been shot and taken off of life support.

== Character development ==
=== Characterisation ===
The character of Roimata upon arrival was described as "Beautiful, intelligent and intriguing" and Ruakere stated that Roimata has a "Cutting sense of humour". She is further stated as "kind" and "nice" Ruakere also stated that; "Roimata is pretty cheeky and can run rings around anyone who challenges her, she's also got a very strong sense of right and wrong. Once she gets an idea in her head, it's very difficult for anyone to change her mind." She has also been described as a; "sophisticated, intelligent, and caring woman with a sense of humour." Roimata had issues with her father and was described as, "trying to find her own identity and passions". Roimata's father Henare (George Henare) arrived to the show in early March and Henare described his characters relationship with Roimata, "My character is a likeable man whose daughter is the apple of his eye, so he was a lovely character to play."

=== Relationships ===
Roimata was introduced as a love interest for TK Samuels (Benjamin Mitchell) and to create a love triangle upon the eventual return of his ex-wife, Sarah (Amanda Billing). Upon arriving to the show, Ruakere teased the idea that Roimata would be getting a love interest, "In true Shortland Street style, there's some exciting romance on the cards for Roimata" Roimata found herself attracted to co worker, TK and after his flirtatious manner, eventually began to date him. Ruakere enjoyed working alongside Mitchell, "Ben's taken me under his wing. He's a very generous actor and I'm learning a lot from him." However, after a month of dating, Sarah returned and announced her pregnancy with TK's child. Ruakere described this moment as a "rough time" and explained the wide range of emotions she had to portray during the onscreen relationship. Sarah pleaded with TK to take her back and raise their child, to which he rejected. Ruakere explained, "It's fair to say that TK makes a relatively big decision about his future with either Sarah or Roimata. And no matter the outcome, you can guarantee that there will stunned reaction from all involved." TK and Roimata became engaged, but on the day of the wedding, he ditched her to attend the birth of his daughter. They subsequently married each other in an unofficial ceremony.

In early 2012, the relationship was briefly shaken when Roimata realized TK was in on an illegal deal with her father. The couple struggled to work alongside each other in the Emergency Department and Roimata found herself at odds with doctor, Josh Gallagher (Chris Tempest). Following her sexual assault, Roimata began to exclude herself from TK and Mitchell speculated the marriage was at risk. Josh provided support for Roimata when TK couldn't and even comforted her at the scene of the crime, leaving TK suspicious of his motives. Ruakere explained that the sexual assault left the couple at odds, "They are two people lost in the middle of the ocean, splashing around, trying desperately to find each other and make sense of stuff and it's not working. She does all the stages - denial, anger - she's just snapping at him and he can't do anything right." Ruakere explained Roimata's bond with Josh, "Ever since the attack, Roimata has trusted Josh and turned to him for guidance. She can't understand why anyone would think he would be the culprit." Roimata was insulted by TK suspecting Josh of the attack, "Roimata feels TK is undermining her by blaming her pillar of support. Just when she needs TK the most, he can't control his anger". However, when Josh's ex-girlfriend Lana Jacobs (Brooke Williams) announced he had fallen for Roimata, she too suspected he may be the attacker. Roimata soon started to develop feelings for Josh, much to TK's ignorance; Mitchell stated, "Roimata is always reassuring TK that she loves him. But he's starting to wonder how much she means it." In May, Roimata gave into her feelings and began a love affair with Josh. Ruakere was upset when she learned Roimata was going to cheat on TK and hoped for a potential reunion though admitted Roimata needed some serious help after her assault.

=== Sexual assault ===
"I guess the first thing I thought was, 'What an incredible challenge and a big deal for Shorty to tackle such a storyline', being a family show and on at 7pm ... it also felt like a huge responsibility for me and I wanted to do it justice."

— Ruakere on the sexual assault storyline.

In 2012 it was decided that the character of Roimata would be subject of a sexual assault at the hands of Zac Smith (Mike Edward). Edward had been hired on a 6-month contract, but, following the implementation of the storyline, his contract was extended. Sexual assault storylines had previously occurred in Shortland Street (such as the rape of Minnie Crozier (Katrina Devine) in 1998), but Ruakere felt Roimata's was portrayed with "the most depth needed". Ruakere wasn't aware when acting out the storyline that it would have great effect on her immediately afterwards, "this storyline is heavy. I had no idea how much it would affect me until after I'd done it. I knew that to do the scene properly, I needed to feel the fear, to have a real force on me. Of course I didn't want to be hurt, but a sexual assault is every woman's worst nightmare and I knew I had to be as scared as I could be. Although we had practised beforehand so that level of contact wasn't uncomfortable, when the time came and my arm was twisted behind my back, there was no acting required." The scene depicted Roimata pinned face first against a wall and sexually assaulted. She described it as "horrific" and "every women's worst nightmare". Behind the scenes, Zac was always intended to be the perpetrator but the assailant was depicted anonymously so as to create suspense. To further the illusion that it was not Zac, directors shot the assault scene with Chris Tempest (Josh Gallagher) actually physically carrying it out, whilst Sam Bunkall (Boyd Rolleston) added the voice over. The trick successfully fooled much of the audience, with many believing it was in fact Beulah Koale's (Jared Afeaki) voice. On screen Zac was interviewed by police when footprints matching his boots were identified at the scene of the crime. Though Zac denied any involvement and was even backed by ex lover, Vasa Levi (Teuila Blakely).

However, on 12 December 2012, Zac was revealed to the audience as the attacker when he threatened Detective Lisa Stone (Caitlin Bossley) and later removed a balaclava to expose his face. The characters soon started to discover the attacker had assaulted Roimata as a personal attack on TK. Further harassments included the assailant breaking into the house and sprawling out Roimata's underwear and later leaving a white feather on the doorstep. As the year ended, Zac poisoned TK and used several tricks to frame Josh for the attack However, with Josh's input, Roimata realised Zac was the attacker and publicly accused him, causing him to lose what little friends he had left. With his dwindling amount of friends, in early 2013 Zac decided to take drastic action in exacting revenge on TK. He kidnapped Roimata, bound and drugged her and locked her in the cellar of 'The I.V.' bar. After Roimata was eventually recovered, Zac was arrested and charged after she collected enough DNA evidence to have him charged. Producer Steven Zanoski praised Ruakere for her dedication to the sexual assault storyline, "I've really admired Shav's dedication to staying true to the emotional depths demanded by the story. From firsthand experience talking to victims of sexual assault, Shavaughn has this week written a letter of protest to the prime minister regarding the government's withdrawal of funding for the sexual violence helpline. This production can be proud that Shavaughn has lent her public profile to promoting awareness around this issue. To me, this says this story was more than just a job for Shavaughn."

== Reception ==
In 2013, Ruakere was nominated for "Best Actress" in the TV Guide Best on the Box Awards following her portrayal of Roimata throughout the sexual assault storyline. Before the characters arrival, it was suggested she was destined to be a popular character due to Ruakere's acting and bubbly personality. Hugh Sundae of The New Zealand Herald stated that "Ruakere seemed to nail it from the first scene. Completely natural and not a trace of that self-awareness newbies often show." Ruakere's co star Amanda Billing stated that TK and Roimata made a good couple with good chemistry. The storyline that saw Zac kidnap Roimata, was voted by fans as their second favourite plot and third biggest plot twist, in the Ferndale Talk Best of 2013 awards. Upon Roimata's death in 2014, a Herald on Sunday blogger suggested that the show had lost one of its "finest actors". Ruakere's co-star Christina Asher who portrayed Roimata's mother Ruth in a guest role, enjoyed how the producers had created such a believable Māori family unit, saying; "No need to say that the writers have done a great job in creating a Māori family with some credibility but it is a relief to see this on our favourite soap. They're a reasonably normal family with a few disfunctions."
