= Josh Gallagher =

- Shortland Street character
- Portrayed by: Chris Tempest
- Duration: 2012–2014
- First appearance: 21 May 2012
- Last appearance: 13 January 2014
- Introduced by: Steven Zanoski
In-universe information
- Occupation: Doctor

Dr. Josh Gallagher is a fictional character on the New Zealand soap opera Shortland Street who was portrayed by Chris Tempest between May 2012 and January 2014. The character was mostly known for his change from friendly to villainous when he developed Hero Syndrome.

== Creation and casting ==
Following the resignation of Robbie Magasiva as the character of Maxwell Avia, writers felt an absence in the Emergency Department set of the soap opera and it was decided that a new doctor would be created. The character of Josh was created, an adrenalin junkie drawn to ED due to its fast-paced performance. Storylines decided to characterize Josh as a mysterious character, working with the idea that his parents were naturopaths. It was decided that Josh would debut in the shows 20th anniversary and as such, a dramatic stunt was planned so as to demonstrate the characters' key elements such as efficiency under pressure. Five actors had callbacks for the part of Josh, with Chris Tempest eventually securing the role. British Tempest was familiar with the show through daytime television as a teenager but was unaware as to its impact in New Zealand, "It doesn't even feel real to be honest. Especially coming over here and seeing how much Shortland Street is part of the Kiwi culture and how high a regard people hold it. It hasn't settled in yet." Tempest believed that this turn was "awfully ironic". Tempest filmed his final scenes as Josh in November 2013, in a storyline that saw Josh die in the annual Christmas cliffhanger. Although most characters' final scenes were filmed out of chronological order, Tempest was allowed to film his character's death as his final scene; something which he thought was a satisfying conclusion.

== Storylines ==
Josh arrived to Ferndale for a job interview with Maxwell Avia (Robbie Magasiva), but was instead thrust into a dramatic helicopter crash, rescuing the crushed Bella Cooper (Amelia Reid). Subsequently, Josh landed a job in the hospital's Emergency Department only to clash majorly with TK Samuels (Benjamin Mitchell). Josh appeared withdrawn and it was soon discovered his fiancée had died from a drug overdose in England. Eventually, he began to date Paige Munroe (Rachel Foreman) but the two broke up and Josh began to date Lana Jacobs (Brooke Williams). However, following his support of Roimata Samuels (Shavaughn Ruakere) after her devastating sexual assault, Lana realized he had fallen in love with her and he subsequently came under suspicion for the attack. Much to TK and the staff's shock, Josh and Roimata began a short-lived affair that isolated the two from their friends. Josh began to associate with Harper's (Ria Vandervis) dodgy mate Neil Hesketh (Erroll Shand), who forced him to smuggle drugs out of the hospital. Josh eventually ratted out the gang and saved Bella from the murderous Neil, resulting in the two ending up in a relationship. The praise saw Josh start to purposefully make patients sick so that he could heal them to applause, climaxing when he poisoned Bella's mother Wendy (Jacqueline Nairn) and electrocuted Nicole's (Sally Martin) girlfriend, Bonnie Deane (Steph Cusick). Roimata, Harper, and TK soon realized what Josh was doing and had him arrested. He was released however and devastatingly exploded a bomb at the staff Christmas function so as to save the victims. Whilst trying to save the life of Roimata, Josh was crushed underneath a large piece of rubble and died after telling a horrified Bella that he loved her.

== Character development ==
=== Relationships ===
Tempest described Josh as an accidental ladies man, "The thing about Josh is he's never trying to be a ladies man. But as it turns out, chicks really dig that." Upon his arrival to the show, Josh was placed in scenes with the returned character of Paige Munroe (Rachel Foreman) and a partnership was established between the two. Tempest believed that the characters got on well due to both having checkered pasts, Josh having lost his fiancée to a drug overdose and Paige having recovered from a drug addiction that saw the death of Jill Kingsbury (Natalie Medlock). Foreman explained, "The two definitely cross paths, and theres a connection, but Paige can't put her finger on it. There are a lot of mixed feelings. It's quickly very clear that Josh doesn't want to reveal himself to anyone, so that makes getting into a relationship difficult. But it's all part of his charm." Tempest believed the characters backgrounds incidentally lead them to each other, "There is what seems like flirting, but it's really just a lot of awkwardness. Both of them are wary about getting into a relationship. Paige has her issues and Josh has his." Foreman agreed with Tempest's view, "I think Josh and Paige are quite similar but just cursed by their respective pasts. They both have baggage and aren't very good at acknowledging it!" Josh and Paige briefly dated but in August, Josh started to develop feelings for Lana Jacobs (Brooke Williams), much to the angst of her ex-boyfriend, Daniel Potts (Ido Drent). Lana warned Josh that she was too preoccupied for a serious romance but he promised there would be little strings attached. However shortly into the relationship in what Tempest described a shortened "honeymoon period", Lana began to shut Josh off in favour of mingling with her recently arrived friends Emma Franklin (Amy Usherwood) and Kylie Brown (Kerry-Lee Dewing). Tempest compared this to how Josh treated Paige, "Its almost like karma. Josh was stand offish with Paige and now he's getting a taste of his own medicine. The roles are reversed and he doesn't like being on the receiving end." Josh soon realized the three girls were starting a smear campaign against Boyd Rolleston (Sam Bunkall) and began to question if Lana was who he wanted to date. Williams didn't think Lana and Josh were well suited together, describing Josh as being "mean" to Lana and not "loose" or "kind" enough.

Josh initially clashed with his boss TK Samuels' (Benjamin Mitchell) wife Roimata (Shavaughn Ruakrere), but following her becoming victim of a sexual assault, Josh offered her comfort and support when TK couldn't. Suspicious of his behavior, TK began to suspect Josh of assaulting Roimata. Ruakere explained Roimata's bond with Josh, "Ever since the attack, Roimata has trusted Josh and turned to him for guidance. She can't understand why anyone would think he would be the culprit." Roimata was insulted by TK suspecting Josh of the attack, "Roimata feels TK is undermining her by blaming her pillar of support. Just when she needs TK the most, he can't control his anger". However, when Josh broke up with Lana and announced he had fallen for Roimata, she too suspected he may be the attacker. Roimata soon started to develop feelings for Josh, much to TK's ignorance; Mitchell stated, "Roimata is always reassuring TK that she loves him. But he's starting to wonder how much she means it." In May, Roimata gave into her feelings and began a love affair with Josh. Josh proved too over protective however and the affair was short lived. The affair isolated Josh from his peers and the friendly, Bella Durville (Amelia Reid) sought to cheer him up, Reid stated, "Bella doesn't know the full story about Josh and Roimata, and assumes Josh is heartbroken. She knows what it's like to be broken hearted and finds joy in helping other people get through difficult times." The two began to date but broke up, causing Josh to travel to Uganda. Upon his return the romance was reignited due to an apparent machete injury he sustained. Bella was horrified when she realized the extent of Josh's hero syndrome, but nonetheless held his hand as he was crushed to death following an explosion he caused, in what has been described as a, "final act of mercy".

=== Hero syndrome ===
In mid-2013, a storyline saw Josh's character drastically alter from a friendly yet womanizing doctor, into an antagonistic villain seeking praise, having developed the disorder hero syndrome. Tempest believed that Josh was still a good guy but was in over his head, "I always had in my mind that Josh had a good heart, and that line gets blurred quite a bit ... He's kind of pushing it a bit more these days and its all because he feels undervalued." The storyline was introduced in June after Josh was alienated by his colleagues and friends, having broken up TK and Roimata's marriage. He was drawn into a life of crime by Harper's (Ria Vandervis) dodgy mate Neil Hesketh (Erroll Shand). Neill soon turned out to be very dangerous and a threat to Josh and his friend Bella. Josh turned on Neill and set him up after organizing a drug raid of the hospital. At this point, the storyline was described as the "biggest" and most prominent on the show. Josh ended up saving Bella, Ula Levi's (Frankie Adams) son Adam (Dylan Keereweer-Taia), and left Neill to die; resulting in praise from his colleagues. Josh began to crave the limelight once more and accepted a charity position simply to face the media, which Roimata (Shavaughn Ruakere) quickly picked up on, Ruakere believed that Roimata had, "seen this side to Josh before. It came out when Roimata and Josh had a relationship. Josh loves to be the good guy but needs to have his moment of glory in return." After a brief holiday in Uganda, Josh returned with what appeared to be a machete wound (but in reality was fake bandage) in an attempt to impress Bella Durville. Josh soon began to partake in much more reckless tasks to achieve praise, such as electrocuting Nicole's (Sally Martin) girlfriend, Bonnie Deane (Steph Cusick), poisoning Wendy (Jacqueline Nairn), and causing Murray (Matthew Chamberlain) to go into cardiac arrest. As the year ended, Roimata, Harper, and TK picked up on Josh's behavior but could not stop him setting off a bomb underneath the Warner family bach, in an attempt to win back Bella, leading to a cliffhanger as to who had survived the explosion. Josh survived the explosion but whilst utilizing his "hero-complex" was crushed and killed attempting to save Roimata's life. Roimata also ended up dying from the blast.

== Reception ==
When reviewing the shows 20th anniversary feature-length episode, Lydia Jenkin pointed out how it had become traditional to introduce a new character during the annual 90 minute episodes and pondered which female character would fall victim to Josh's good looks and charm. One of the shows writers, Rebecca Barry Hill, listed the Shortland Street 20th anniversary as one of the highlights of New Zealand television in 2012 and specifically noted Josh's introduction. Paul Casserly of The New Zealand Herald believed that by casting unlikeable characters on TV shows, producers were in effect pulling in viewers who consumed the product simply to hate the character. He noted Josh as an example of this on Shortland Street and referenced a friend who believed Josh was the, "worst character, worst actor". Tempest noticed a significant difference in attitude towards Josh as his hero syndrome developed, "When my character was a bit of a good guy, there were a lot more people stopping me on the street going, 'Hey, how's it going?' Every time I walk down the streets these days... people kind of look over their shoulder and go, 'Ohh'." Josh and Roimata's affair was named as one of the top moments of the 2013 season, alongside Josh's heroic adventure in the 90 minute episode and his bomb in the season finale. Broadcaster Jason Reeves described Josh's story lines throughout 2013 as "spectacular", with Tempest specifically noting the antagonistic character development. Television blogger, Chris Philpot, believed that though Josh was written with "generic dialogue", Tempest had done some "decent work" portraying him in the 2013 finale. In the Ferndale Talk Best of 2013 awards, Josh was voted by fans as the character, "you most want to leave", "Most Deluded Character" and the character with, "The most ridiculous story lines". The storyline that saw Josh rat out the hospital heist was named the best storyline of the year. The episode featuring Josh's death was viewed by 622,630 viewers, making it the most viewed television show in New Zealand that night.
