= Daniel Potts (Shortland Street) =

- Shortland Street character
- Portrayed by: Jarred Blakiston (2004–2007); Ido Drent (2009–2012)
- Duration: 2004–2005, 2007, 2009–2012
- First appearance: 29 September 2004
- Last appearance: 17 September 2012
- Introduced by: Harriet Crampton (2004); Jason Daniel (2007); Steven Zanoski (2009)
- Daniel in 2005 as portrayed by Jarred Blakiston
In-universe information
- Occupation: Student (2010); Orderly (2010, 2011–2012); Software engineer (2011); Entrepreneur (2012)
- Father: Tim Coombes
- Mother: Sarah Potts
- Stepmother: Theresa Coombes
- Half-sisters: Grace Coombes; Tillie Samuels
- Grandfathers: Morgan Potts
- Grandmothers: Pam Potts

Daniel Joshua Potts is a fictional character in the soap opera Shortland Street. The role was originated by actor Jarred Blakiston from 2004 to 2005 and again briefly in 2007 before Ido Drent took over in 2009. The character departed in mid-2012.

The character arrived to the show in a high-profile storyline that saw Daniel revealed as his "sister" Sarah's (Amanda Billing) illegitimate son. Daniel departed in 2005 to live with his newly discovered father Tim Coombes (Millen Baird) before returning briefly in 2007 to attend Sarah's wedding. His return in 2009 saw Daniel adopt a more antagonistic role that saw Daniel participate in a bullying storyline. Renowned for his intellect and computing skills, Daniel storylines went on to feature internet entrepreneurism, government introduced bootcamps, abortion, homelessness and brain trauma.

== Creation and casting ==
The character was originally played by Jarred Blakiston from 2004 to 2005 and again for a guest role in 2007. When producers decided to reintroduce the character, the decision was made to recast him and Ido Drent won the role. He stated, "It's been such a great experience and challenge already. Everyone at Shortland Street has been incredibly supportive and encouraging. It's very close knit and there's a great vibe ... I feel so lucky to be where I am." The character returned onscreen in March 2009 in a storyline that was set to accurately portray bullying on screen and Drent promised the storyline would, "have an element of romance to it." Drent returned to the show after a 10-week break in mid-2010. In 2012 Drent quit the role to pursue job opportunities in Australia. He commented: "For me, broadening myself as an actor, it was imperative that I move on, even if it meant losing a bit of security and taking a big risk." When reading Daniel's final scripts, Drent was brought to tears at the conclusion of his hard work and how the storyline resembled his own life. Daniel made his last appearance on 17 September 2012. Drent was asked to reprise the role in 2014 for his onscreen mother's funeral but was unavailable.

== Storylines ==
Sarah Potts (Amanda Billing) was delighted upon her arrival to Ferndale that she could be closer to her brother, Daniel, but it was shockingly revealed to Craig Valentine (Renato Bartolomei) that Daniel was in reality, her illegitimate son. Daniel struggled with the news and, when he moved in with Sarah, clashed with her partner, Andrew (Paolo Rotondo). In 2005 Daniel finally met his dad Tim (Millen Baird) and after Tim's initial hesitation, the two grew close. Despite Sarah's reluctance, Daniel eventually went to live with his father in Samoa. He returned in 2007 for Sarah's wedding to TK (Benjamin Mitchell) but got into trouble when he stole Sarah's car. Daniel returned to live with Sarah in 2009 and after falling in with a bad crowd, began to date Sophie McKay (Kimberley Crossman). His illegal business of selling stolen goods saw his friend die in a car crash and Daniel was sent to bootcamp and later took up boxing, something that nearly saw him beaten to death by a gang.

Sophie left Daniel and in 2010 he began to date humanitarian, Loren Fitzpatrick (Sophia Johnson). However Loren fell pregnant and the two broke up when she had an abortion with Sarah's help. Daniel briefly became homeless before he forgave his mother. He and Sophie reconciled but in 2011 Sophie left him to travel the world. Daniel briefly dated Paige Munroe (Rachel Foreman) and became a computer software engineer before Shane (Jason Hood) claimed Daniel's work as his own. In December Daniel was assaulted over the head whilst stopping Hunter (Lee Donoghue) from robbing a pharmacy and he developed serious brain damage. He dated Lana Jacobs (Brooke Williams) but his memory loss proved too severe and the two broke up. In August a lucky night at the casino saw Daniel win $1,000,000 and after trying to win Lana back, he left Ferndale to travel the world. In 2014, TK called Daniel and told him the news of Sarah's death. Daniel could not attend Sarah's funeral as his pregnant girlfriend Lisa had been hospitalized.

== Character development ==
Daniel was initially portrayed as a quiet and well mannered child but the revelation that Sarah (Amanda Billing) was his mother sent him on a downward spiral, Blakiston commented: "It's taken him a long time to come to terms with Sarah being his real mother. It's led him to do and say things he doesn't necessarily mean." Following the revelation of the secret, the storyline saw Daniel's school work suffer and he even got into fights at school. Blakiston believed it was how Daniel dealt with the secret: "He knows Sarah will do anything for him, that she really wants to show she cares. If he doesn't get what he wants, he punishes and manipulates her, and even though she tries not to, she always gives in." Upon his return in 2009, Daniel was described as an "articulate and intelligent teenager" and was shown to be interested in computers, sport and making friends. However it was soon clear Daniel had little understanding of his mother's multiple sclerosis and planned to use it as an excuse "to party and enjoy himself as much as possible." Drent explained that Daniel "holds a lot of resentment" towards his mother and "He's willing to go to pretty dramatic lengths to win a crowd and I think that surprises people." Drent believed he and Daniel had small similarities, he stated: "I'd say we're both fairly focused on what we want, both determined and both pretty cheeky!" In a September 2011 interview with 20/20, Drent expressed concern at the new-found protagonistic characteristics of his character, stating; "you can't be too good in a drama, otherwise there's no room for you!"

== Reception ==
The casting of Drent in the role came as a surprise to many fans of the show due to his muscular physique contrasting Blakiston's petite shape. However Drent's portrayal of Daniel has been said to having made a "big impression" on the soap. Meanwhile, some critics have been less favourable towards Drent's acting, with Hugh Sundae of The New Zealand Herald in 2010, stating that newcomer Geordie Holibar (Phoenix Raynor) had already outdone Drent in his acting capabilities. Chris Philpot, a television commentator on stuff.co.nz, jokingly stated that he would willingly kill off Daniel. In the Ferndale Best of 2013 awards, Daniel was voted runner up for "Character you want to Return", losing only to his mother.
