= Love Has No Language =

- Directed by: Ken Khan
- Written by: Ken Khan
- Produced by: Pan Pacific Pictures
- Starring: Celina Jaitley; Rati Agnihotri; Colin Mathura-Jeffree; Benjamin Mitchell; Kiran Kumar
- Release date: 12 November 2008
- Countries: India; New Zealand
- Language: English

Love Has No Language is a 2008 film directed by Ken Khan. Film stars Celina Jaitley, Rati Agnihotri, Colin Mathura-Jeffree, Ben Mitchell and Kiran Kumar.

== Plot ==
This film is a love story between an Indian girl and a Māori guy. Their love is not approved by their families.

== Cast ==
- ( Yazmeen (Acikgoez) Baker): Tara
- Celina Jaitley: Marina Roy
- Benjamin Mitchell: Lucky Shaman
- Colin Mathura-Jeffree: Sidth Reddy
- Kiran Kumar: Mr Roy
- Rati Agnihotri: Mrs Roy
- Peter Mochrie: Officer Eastwood
- Rob Williams: Sam
- James Gray: Terry
- Martyn Williams: Mr Smith
