= Sarah Potts (Shortland Street) =

- Shortland Street character
- Portrayed by: Amanda Billing
- Duration: 2004–2014, 2023
- First appearance: 14 September 2004
- Last appearance: 23 June 2023
- Introduced by: Harriet Crampton (2004); Oliver Driver (2023)
In-universe information
- Occupation: Doctor at Shortland Street Hospital
- Father: Morgan Potts
- Mother: Pam Potts
- Husband: Andrew Solomon (2005–2007); Te Koha Samuels (2007–2011)
- Sons: Daniel Potts
- Daughters: Tillie Samuels
- Aunts: Gwen Potts

Dr. Sarah Marjorie Potts is a fictional character on the New Zealand soap opera Shortland Street, who was portrayed by Amanda Billing from her first appearance in September 2004 until the character's on-screen death in August 2014.

Arriving as a love interest for established character, Craig (Renato Bartolomei), Sarah became the centre of a high-profile storyline when it was revealed her young brother Daniel (Jarred Blakiston) was in fact her illegitimate son. Sarah and Craig's romance carried on for four years and climaxed in what has been described as "Shortland Street's steamiest ever scene." Sarah's romance storyline's again took a high-profile role with her pairing to TK Samuels (Benjamin Mitchell) in 2006. Over the next 8 years the two were involved in a "will they-won't they" situation that involved the two getting married, divorced, having a child, and engaged for a second time. Public interest was high for the romance and boosted the show some of its highest ever ratings; the Prime Minister Helen Clark also expressed her interest in whether the two would end up together. In 2008 the character was diagnosed with multiple sclerosis in a storyline producers intended to use to explore the long-term effects of the illness and help educate New Zealanders.

The character of Sarah has seen high acclaim for the show and Billing's acting. She has been nominated and won multiple awards including a nomination in the New Zealand Television Awards for "Best Actress". The characters diagnosis with multiple sclerosis has seen huge acclaim, with sufferers and health advocates praising the show for bringing the illness to such a high-profile programme.

== Creation and casting ==
Amanda Billing previously auditioned for the roles of lesbian nurse Maia Jeffries and the ill-fated Avril Luchich before she was offered the role of Sarah in early 2004. Sarah made her debut on 14 September 2004. The character was described as "a good looking, vivacious and driven woman in her early 30s" and was "liked, easy-going and good-humoured". In the casting of Sarah, it was suggested that producers were carrying on the tradition of placing talented unknowns in starring roles. Sarah was written off the show in late 2010 when Billing took a four-month break to star in a play. Her exit storyline was purposefully ambiguous so that the audience was not aware Sarah would return. Billing struggled to keep the secret from the public and was hugely relieved when Sarah returned onscreen in March 2011.

In late 2013 producers decided to retire the character of Sarah. They decided it was best to kill her off as then the character of TK Samuels could develop further romantic connections without fans opposing to it due to Sarah still being alive. Billing was informed in March 2014. She described the writing off process as one that had much "stuff that plays into it" and noted some of it she understood, whilst much of it she did not. She hoped that Sarah would get a "dramatic" write-off that would involve much location shooting. One of Sarah's final scenes that saw her say goodbye to her toddler daughter Tillie (Leila Eketone) proved difficult to film due to the cast and crew crying; a scene Billing described filming as "deliciously painful". Billing finished filming in July and was celebrated with a large cast party. The publicity department worked hard to ensure the departure would not be leaked to the press following previous leaks on the departures of Teuila Blakely (Vasa Levi) and Beth Allen (Brooke Freeman), something Billing found hard to keep a secret. The character was killed off during scenes airing on 18 August 2014.

== Storylines ==
Sarah arrived to Shortland Street and won a job working in ED under Craig Valentine (Renato Bartolomei). They dated but broke up when it was scandalously revealed that Sarah's brother Daniel (Jarred Blakiston), was in fact her son. Despite being attracted to Craig, she married Andrew Solomon (Paolo Rotondo) but their marriage was annulled after Andrew left Sarah to be with his ex-girlfriend and children. Sarah briefly dated a schoolboy and later conman Hamish (Phil Brown). She continually found herself attracted to Craig and started to date him before the two broke up due to his anger problems. They made up and dated again but broke up when Craig cheated on Sarah with Huia (Nicola Kawana), impregnating her. Huia's cousin TK Samuels (Benjamin Mitchell) comforted her through the ordeal and when Craig readmitted his love, Sarah was faced with a tough decision between Craig and TK. Sarah finally made a decision and in December 2006 asked TK to marry her. The couple married in mid-2007 and later decided to have kids. However, in 2008 after being diagnosed with Multiple sclerosis the couple suffered a shock when they learnt Sarah's baby would be born with a deathly illness and it was terminated. In 2009 Brooke Freeman (Beth Allen) manipulated Sarah into thinking TK was unhappy and the two separated. She rebounded to Maxwell Avia (Robbie Magasiva) but the two broke up in 2010 and Sarah had a one-night stand with TK shortly before leaving to work in America.

Sarah made a surprise return to Shortland Street in March 2011 and announced she was pregnant with TK's child, a girl. Sarah planned to get back with TK and clashed with his new fiancé Roimata Ngatai (Shavaughn Ruarkere). In July 2011 Sarah gave birth to daughter, Matilda Mareikura "Tillie" Potts (Nathan Anderson) after leaving TK's wedding. Sarah began to date Daniel's (Ido Drent) carer Zac Smith (Mike Edward) and accepted more administrative positions at the hospital. However, after 8 months of dating, Sarah discovered Zac had been having a long-term affair behind her back with her friend Vasa Levi and they broke up. In 2013 Sarah lost her job to her friend Harper Whitley (Ria Vandervis) and ended up reconciling with TK after nearly 4 years apart. Their relationship was put to the test when Sarah accidentally reversed over Tillie in her truck, but the two remained together. In mid 2014 Sarah began researching a killer virus and ultimately ended up getting engaged to TK once again. However, in August, upon finally discovering the illness' cure, Sarah's MS relapsed and she contracted it herself and died after a tearful farewell to TK and Tillie. In 2023, Sarah, Roimata and Mo Hannah would appear to TK in spirit form, willing him back to life after he'd been shot and taken off of life support.

== Character development ==
=== Relationships ===
==== Craig Valentine ====
The character of Sarah was originally written into the show as a potential love interest for established character, Craig Valentine (Renato Bartolomei). Sarah's first scene involved her crashing into Craig's car, driven by his son Jake Valentine (Calum Gittins). Upon learning Sarah was trying for a job in his department, Craig opposed to her job application, nonetheless, CEO Andrew Solomon (Paolo Rotondo) hired her. Throughout Sarah's early scenes, she often interacted with Craig and a sense of chemistry and potential romance was established between them. Billing offered an opinion as to why the two had such good chemistry saying; "I think you can find someone physically attractive but hate their guts, someone can irritate you heaps but you still find them a lovable rogue. The two characters are a lot alike, and that's why they spar. They're both headstrong and think that they're right more often than not." Following the two characters first kiss, the cast and crew reportedly fell quiet in awe. Billing agreed saying: "We have monitors through the whole building and everyone was going, 'Bloody hell!' Their chemistry is quite extraordinary," The two broke up due to Sarah's son Daniel (Jarred Blakiston) and Sarah became engaged to Andrew but after believing he had died in a plane crash, Sarah realized she was in love with Craig. Nonetheless, when she found out Andrew had survived, she committed to marry him. Billing believed Sarah was: "being a chicken .... She does love Andrew and she does have feelings for him but it's not really what she wants in her heart of hearts. There's a real risk that she is making a mistake, she will regret it and they will break up." Bartolomei believed Craig would still love Sarah even if she were married, "from Craig's point of view, he really loves (Sarah), whether he can have her or not. I think his love for her is so great that he would love her even if she married Andrew and lives happily ever after." Even Rotondo believed Craig was a better suit, "Andrew hasn't been set up as the ideal guy for her so definitely I think she should be with Craig." Despite this, Sarah and Andrew married.

In 2006 Sarah and Craig finally got together in what has been described as "Shortland Street's Steamiest ever scene." However, the two constantly argued and Craig cheated on Sarah with Huia Samuels (Nicola Kawana), impregnating her. Bartolomei believed Sarah would be devastated when she found out about the child and stated: "He would be aware that it was going to be very difficult for Sarah but he would tell her what he was going to do and hope that it was going to work out. I think he will stand back and let things play their natural course, if that meant Sarah was no longer in his world... then so be it. I think he will stand back and say, 'well Sarah, how are you going to behave in this situation? If you are going to behave stupidly then let's call it quits'." The two stayed together following the revelation of the baby but Huia ended up dying in an explosion whilst pregnant and Sarah broke it off once again. At the end of the year, Craig admitted his love before a short holiday but Sarah had a difficult time deciding between him and TK Samuels (Benjamin Mitchell). Billing described the conundrum, saying: "Sarah is nervous about Craig’s return because she knows that he will be coming back to a situation that will be very different from the one that he left. In a lot of ways Sarah and Craig are still the hero couple but she is scared of him being angry and is worried that she is going to lose him."< Despite Billing labelling the couple as having; "dynamic that is high voltage", she also believed; "They’re not very good at being a couple together because they haven’t figured out how to work as a team." Sarah ended up choosing TK over him. On her wedding day to TK in 2007, Sarah decided to call off the marriage, fearing she still loved Craig. She visited Craig but he insisted on driving her to the wedding himself. Sarah came back from her honeymoon early to help Craig, causing a feud with Craig's girlfriend Alice Piper (Toni Potter). In 2008 Craig diagnosed Sarah with multiple sclerosis. Upon resigning, Bartolomei commented on Craig's relationship with Sarah, stating: "Craig and Sarah are your classic unrequited love story. That does get revisited but not in a stereotypical way. There is a great deal of resolution at the end for everyone concerned." On screen Craig resigned from Shortland Street and admitted he would always love Sarah before the two shared a moment. He was murdered later that evening. Sarah sung an emotional song at his service, highlighting his personality and kindness. Billing believed that for several years, Craig was Sarah's one true love and was touched when she saw a hashtag '#ReunitedwithCraig' on Twitter concerning Sarah's death in 2014.

==== TK Samuels ====
With TK Samuels (Benjamin Mitchell) arriving in early 2006, Sarah found herself annoyed and conflicted with the newby immature doctor. However, TK took a shine to Sarah and did all he could to impress her. Having found boyfriend, Craig (Renato Bartolomei) cheating on her with TK's cousin Huia (Nicola Kawana), Sarah used TK as a shoulder to cry on and the two soon got together. Billing explained Sarah's conflict between Craig and TK, stating: "TK really loves Sarah and he is very patient and understanding with her where Craig isn’t. He accepts that she is difficult whereas Craig isn’t very patient with her and doesn’t understand her well at all." As 2006 ended, Sarah found herself torn between Craig and TK, eventually choosing and proposing to TK. Mitchell believed that TK was the love of Sarah's life, and stating that neither Andrew Solomon (Paolo Rotondo) or Craig; "Were the right one for Sarah; TK is the one." Mitchell also believed that TK was alright with Craig's attendance at the wedding, stating: "He was invited by Sarah, and he thinks it’s fair for Craig to attend the wedding. TK still has respect for Craig." Shortly into the relationship, Sarah began to lose trust in TK when she saw him sharing a drink with his ex lover Holly Makatea, Billing explained: "Sarah doesn’t know anything about their relationship. She has heard the name Holly mentioned before but she only knows her in passing as a social worker up on Q Road. TK has never told her about any previous relationship." Billing also stated: "The last thing Sarah expects to see is her boyfriend with a young gorgeous Maori Woman like Holly. She can tell they have a close connection and that makes her feel immediately uncomfortable and a little bit insecure." Sarah proposed to TK, feeling bad about her judgmental nature towards Holly but he declined as he feared Holly had given him HIV, Sarah promised to love him nonetheless and they got engaged. Tests later declared TK free of HIV. TK and Sarah wed in mid-2007, with Sarah initially cautious as she believed she may still love Craig. Sarah clashed with TK's family and Billing believed the arrival of TK's nephews to the house only further drove a wedge between her and the Samuels, stating: "Sarah is aware that when she went to the tangi she made some enemies, even though she was just trying to be straight up. She has been on the marae before, but she found that quite an alienating experience and she is prepared to feel that way again. She is definitely feeling apprehensive because they decided not to invite a lot of the whanau to the wedding and she realises she might get some flack for that. But she realises going to the Marae is important for TK’s sake and her relationship’s sake, and it is important she doesn’t make any more enemies. She is determined to put on a brave face and be nice and show she is capable of integrating into the family."

The two decided to start a family in late 2007; however, TK soon voted against it and Sarah feared she had made a mistake marrying TK. However, the two soon made up and decided to try for a family again. The couple found themselves pregnant, but the baby would have been born ill, so the pregnancy was terminated. Sarah broke up with TK when Brooke Freeman (Beth Allen) purposely drove a wedge between the couple after falling madly in love with TK. Billing found the breakup uncomfortable to film, stating: "It has been very difficult to play, there are some days when I've thought she's just being a complete twit." She believed that Sarah found herself to be a "burden" to TK with her illness and it affected her "confidence and belief in herself". TK and Sarah set up a clinic in 2010 and Sarah later readmitted her love, causing a one-night stand before she left the country. Upon her unexpected arrival, Sarah announced she was pregnant with TK's child and she loved him. However, TK had moved on with Roimata (Shavaughn Ruakere) and despite feelings for Sarah, announced it was over forever. Billing sympathised with Sarah during the ordeal, "My heart breaks for Sarah Potts because her bubble is well and truly burst. She has a fantasy in her head and when she comes home it's not what she expects." Billing acknowledged that TK and Roimata have good chemistry but praised TK and Sarah's possible rekindling saying; "Roimata and TK make a really good couple but Sarah and TK were really good too and wouldn't it be great for them to be a family?" In October 2012, following the revelation that her boyfriend of 8 months, Zac Smith (Mike Edward) had been cheating on her, Sarah found herself attracted once again to TK, who offered her support.

In August 2013, Sarah moved in with TK so that they could look after Tillie together following his separation from Roimata. Sarah's hopes for romance reignited but Billing hoped that it was mutual. Mitchell was "shocked" when he read the storyline and hoped that their relationship "would be different" than before. Sarah struggled to tell TK her true feelings as Billing believed "it'll ruin the friendship that they have .... Sarah doesn't imagine he has romantic feelings for her." In September 2013, Sarah and TK finally reconciled. Sarah travelled to America for several months on a MS trial and in the interim, TK developed feelings for her friend Harper Whitley (Ria Vandervis) but stayed committed. However, Sarah's trial turned out not to have worked and TK ended up turning to violence, Mitchell believed that, "His violent reaction definitely doesn’t go unnoticed and it’s going to cause problems for him and his family." In early 2014 producers decided to kill off the character of Sarah as they didn't think fans would believe TK dating any other character with the possibility of Sarah returning. Billing believed the way the relationship was written in her final storyline was "sweet" and well "crafted", as she believed he was her true soul mate. The storyline saw Sarah fight to discover the cure of a killer illness much to the annoyance of TK, whom disagreed with her ambition. Mitchell believed that this, "pisses him off to tell the truth. She's a mother; she should be there spending time with her family. She's got MS herself and she's not really taking care of herself." Billing believed the storyline saw a development in the relationship, "Their relationship changes because of their involvement in this situation. That tenacity can be really annoying for (TK) but he knows that it results in good things for other people." The storyline saw the two become engaged once again. Sarah ended up finding a cure, only to succumb to the illness herself.

=== Multiple Sclerosis ===
After suggesting her character have a sickness storyline, Billing was notified Sarah was to undergo a storyline where she is diagnosed with multiple sclerosis. Billing originally thought Sarah was to be killed off but realised it was to be a larger story arc, saying; "I thought they were trying to kill her off, but the idea is to show Sarah living with it". Producer Jason Daniel explained the situation; "As a continuing serial Shortland Street has the ability to explore situations and issues in considerable depth over long periods – and this is what we intend to do with Sarah's multiple sclerosis." In mid-2008, Sarah started to realise she was suffering from an illness which began to gradually affect her work. Ex-boyfriend Craig Valentine diagnosed Sarah with multiple sclerosis, a fact Sarah kept hidden from husband, TK. The illness starts to seriously affect Sarah's fast-paced job as a consultant in the Emergency Department. Sarah later reveals to TK the truth about her illness and TK goes into overdrive, changing her meal plans and exercise routines. To accurately portray the symptoms of MS, Billing researched heavily, including using the internet, medical advisers and the advice of a friend with the illness. Sarah begun to attend MS support groups but struggled to come to terms with how sick she may become. Billing herself attended MS groups to research the role but found attendance a strange experience: "It was quite a bit different to be pretending to have MS in the midst of people who do have MS. I was intimidated by that, it was quite strange, really humbling." Despite finally being awarded head of ED, Sarah realised she had to resign as a result of her eventual inability to perform such a fast-paced job. Billing commented on Sarah resigning, "Sarah has a hard time letting go. Emergency medicine is her number one love - it's her identity and the thought of not having that in her life is terrifying. But she knows her MS is getting worse and deep down she knows leaving ED is her only choice."

In late 2009 Sarah has a relapse in her MS symptoms, confirming her suspicion she will never heal and it will affect her chance of having children, causing her to leave TK. She has another relapse in mid-2010, cementing her relationship with Maxwell. Billing hoped the relapse was realistic saying; "Initially, I did a lot of reading, as well as speaking to a couple of people directly affected by MS. I also spoke to a psychologist about how the condition affects people's mental health and wellbeing. It's important to me that Sarah's experience looks real, so I always ask the medical advisor at Shortland Street for information about her symptoms." She also thoroughly enjoyed playing them, being quoted as saying; "Sarah's Multiple Sclerosis diagnosis has meant when she has a relapse, I'm telling the story of people living with the condition. It makes work less 'soapy' and more realistic, more meaningful." However, Billing found the remissions relaxing, stating; "When Sarah's in remission it's a relief, but I sometimes catch myself waiting for things to get hard again when she has a relapse. I always find her recurrences a bit stressful and not just form a technical view (i.e. wanting to make her condition looks authentic). I know it's acting, and it's not real, but when Sarah's having a recurrence I do feel a bit of what it must be like when something like MS changes you – and changes the way people relate to you." In November 2010 Sarah leaves Ferndale, having won a position in a MS research team in the United States. However, upon her return, she is finally pregnant. Once having given birth to daughter, Tillie in July 2011, Sarah has another relapse in her symptoms and begins to fear for her ability to mother Tillie. In September, Sarah's condition appears to be in remission but she suddenly has a severe attack, losing control of her speech, legs and arms, with Tillie unsupervised.

== Reception ==
=== Accolades ===
Billing received a nomination in the New Zealand TV Guide Best on the Box awards 2011 for "Best Actress", losing out to Robyn Malcolm for her role in Outrageous Fortune. She received the same nomination the following year for her acting throughout 2011, for which she won. Billing was pleased with the win saying; "I was up against some amazingly talented ladies so I am incredibly surprised that I won! But it's lovely to know that people have been watching and that the character resonates with them." In 2012, the character was named as one of the standout characters of the show's first 20 years. Billing also received a nomination for "Best Actress" in the 2012 New Zealand Television Awards. In 2013 Billing was again nominated for the TV Guide Best on the Box Award for "Best Actress", for which she won again. She stated, "I was very flattered and pleased to be considered'" and voiced her disbelief at beating co-star Shavaughn Ruakere (Roimata Samuels) following her sexual assault storyline. Billing also landed a nomination for "Sexiest Female". In the Ferndale Talk Best of 2013 awards, Sarah was runner up for "Favourite Character" whilst Billing was also runner up for "Favourite Actress". Sarah and TK won "Favourite Couple" and Sarah also won the character whom fans most want to return due to her temporary absence. In 2014 Billing was nominated for the fourth time in the TV Guide Best on the Box Award for "Best Actress".

=== Impact ===
The character has also received much dislike with Billing stating the role takes a toll and; "one doesn’t like to play a character that people don’t have a lot of sympathy for. Shes a good doctor but she's a but useless in her private life." In November 2006, Fiona Rae of The Listener magazine, criticised the storyliners of the show, suggesting they had turned Sarah: "into a self-absorbed witch with a “b”. Fortunately for us, she does a mean drunk and gets to embarrass herself heaps." She was called "popular" by producer Jason Daniel in 2008. Billing herself reflected on the strong nature of her character, referring to her as "stroppy". One fan enjoyed the character to such an extent they made a false profile on social networking site, Myspace. They chose to create the page about Sarah as they liked the character and; "It's easy to create a page about a character with so many issues." During a speech at the show's 15th anniversary, the Prime Minister Helen Clark satirically suggested that the question of whether Sarah would marry TK was a major issue. The departure of Sarah alongside several other characters, saw what journalist Duncan Grieve described as a "disappointing" era of the show, where it entered a style of "regularity" and lacked "long-running and well-acted" characters and became a "blur". The New Zealand Woman's Day magazine listed Sarah as the best character of the soap's first 25 years.

The character's diagnosis with multiple sclerosis has also helped educate New Zealanders about the illness. Sufferers of multiple sclerosis praised the show, pleasing producer Jason Daniel who said; "The story has already examined the impact her diagnosis has on her personally and professionally. And in the future it will explore how she learns to live with her MS. I’m very pleased that the MS Society approves of our efforts so far, and I hope that audiences will continue to find Sarah's story inspiring and uplifting." Billing was pleased that fans of the show were so supportive of Sarah and TK and believed they saw their own families in the coupling, "I'm stoked that the audience is so supportive of them getting back together. Maybe it's because we all want Mum, Dad and the kids to be together." Billing believed that the love triangle between Sarah, TK and Roimata was relatable, "Everyone's had the experience of feeling that something's getting in the way."

Sarah and Andrew's (Paolo Rotondo) wedding was viewed by 676,400 people, landing more viewers than ratings juggernaut – Desperate Housewives. In 2006 an episode focused solely on the character of Sarah and was told through flashback. Daniel ensured viewers that fans of the TK/Sarah/Craig love triangle would thoroughly enjoy the episode.The July 2011 90-minute episode which concluded with Sarah giving birth, received incredibly high ratings with an audience of 834,200. Billing offered an opinion on the reason as to why Sarah's storyline concerning her daughter was so well received, saying; "When theres children involved, and love and illness, it gets really hard and I think the audience loves that." Producer, Steven Zanoski suggested part of the reason for the episodes success was the song Billing released as part of the marketing towards the Winter Season. The song, a cover of Ever Fallen in Love (With Someone You Shouldn't've) by Pete Shelley, peaked at number 24 in the New Zealand chart. The birth scene was also named by Television New Zealand as one of the top moments of 2011, and was voted by fans as one of the show's most iconic moments. The episode was the second most watched episode in the shows first 25 years on screen.

The episode airing Sarah's death drew 564,210 viewers, making it the second most watched television show in New Zealand that night. The week following the episode saw an average of 614,000 viewers and became the most watched week of the year. Following the episodes airing, 1.2 million Facebook comments were posted mourning the character. This reached 1.6 million by the end of the week. Television New Zealand set up a "Sarah Potts Tribute" website that some commentators saw as a blur between fiction and reality. The hashtag '#RIPSarahPotts' became the number one topic trending in New Zealand on Twitter following the episode. The episode featuring Sarah's funeral was the 10th most watched episode of the show in its first 25 years.
