= TK Samuels =

- Shortland Street character
- Portrayed by: Benjamin Mitchell
- Duration: 2006–2023
- First appearance: 25 January 2006
- Last appearance: 30 June 2023
- Introduced by: Jason Daniel
In-universe information
- Other names: Te Koha Samuels
- Occupation: Doctor at Shortland Street Hospital
- Father: Apirana Wira
- Mother: Liz Arthur
- Half-brothers: Luke Whakapono
- Half-sisters: Ngaio Wira
- Wife: Sarah Potts (2007–2011); Roimata Ngatai (2011–2014); Cece King (2022–)
- Daughters: Gia Te Atakura; Matilda Potts
- Grandmothers: Mareikura Samuels
- Uncles: Wiremu Samuels; Mitch Samuels
- Aunts: Kuini Samuels; Dottie Samuels; Miri Samuels
- Nephews: Tane Samuels; Wiremu Potae; Ezra Whakapono
- First cousins: Paora Samuels; Huia Samuels; Anahera Samuels; Rua Potae; Esther Samuels

Te Koha "TK" Samuels is a fictional character in New Zealand's longest-running soap opera Shortland Street, played by actor Benjamin Mitchell from early 2006 until mid 2023.

== Creation and casting ==
The character of Huia Samuels' (Nicola Kawana) cousin TK was envisioned in a time of immense change for Shortland Street; the arrival of a new producer on the show saw a large cast overhaul including the exit of the soap's only Pacific Islander, Vinnie Kruse (Pua Magasiva) and the axing of three of the shows Māori characters, Tama (David Wikaira-Paul, Shannon (Amber Curreen) and Rangimarie Hudson (Mia Cureen-Poko). The only other two Māori characters dealt very little with cultural issues and so it was decided to introduce a new character who was deeply passionate about his heritage. Former "Mr. New Zealand" Benjamin Mitchell had been preparing himself for a role on the soap for three years, stating: "I really want to be on the street. It seems to be everyone takes you seriously on there." Mitchell had previously portrayed a reporter in a guest role in 2000. In 2005 he finally auditioned for the show, aiming for the part of the new doctor, TK Samuels. He decided that if he did not win the role, he would give up on acting and pursue another career. Although he believed he had done poorly, after several takes Mitchell won the role and stated, "There will be a few people who go, 'I know that guy, my gosh he's on Shortland Street, I didn't know he was doing this...last time I saw him he was punching bags in his garage trying to be the champ of the world.'" In 2005 producer Jason Daniel, promised a "fresh dynamic" would be arriving to the show with the introduction of several new characters, such as "spunky young doctor" TK. TK made his debut on the episode airing 26 January 2006. Mitchell enjoyed the freedom the role created for him, "Your creativity is really heightened; you produce results faster. That's a great thing that working here teaches you." Following the introduction of TK, the Māori presence on the show was equally measured for the television network's charter to portray Māori perspectives. In 2013 Mitchell stated that he was "content" with staying on the show for the foreseeable future. Following surgery on his shoulder in mid 2015, Mitchell struggled to appear mobilised on screen and storylines were rewritten to incorporate his injury into the show.

== Storylines ==
TK arrived to the hospital in 2006 to greet his cousin Huia (Nicola Kawana) and the immature doctor quickly gained a job in the Emergency Department much to the annoyance of Sarah Potts (Amanda Billing). TK also got a job in another clinic and briefly dated the receptionist Holly (Miriama McDowell) before he realised he was in love with Sarah. After moving to the GP clinic he and Sarah got together and married in 2007, shortly after TK reconciled with his estranged mother Liz (Rima Te Wiata). TK and Sarah's relationship turned sour when Sarah ditched the honeymoon but they soon decided to have children. TK supported Sarah through her diagnosis of multiple sclerosis and their happiness at Sarah's pregnancy was short lived when she was forced to have a termination after the fetus proved to be ill. TK moved back to ED and with the ever looming problem of children in the relationship, Sarah left TK and he had a brief rebound fling with Brooke Freeman (Beth Allen). TK went on to date Tania Jeffries (Faye Smythe) and Jennifer Mason (Sara Wiseman) but as 2010 ended, TK and Sarah readmitted their love and had a one-night stand before Sarah left Ferndale. TK began to date Roimata Ngatai (Shavaughn Ruakere) in the following months but was shocked when Sarah returned, pregnant with his child. TK hastily proposed to Roimata however the wedding was called off due to the sudden birth of his daughter Matilda Mareikura "Tillie" Potts (Nathan Anderson). TK and Roimata later married in an unofficial ceremony, with a fern leaf replacing the ring.

In 2012 TK accepted the role of head of the Emergency Department from Maxwell Avia (Robbie Magasiva). The hospital staff were shocked in November when Roimata was sexually assaulted and TK was continuously harassed by an anonymous attacker. The attacker drugged TK and he ended up running down Murray Cooper (Matthew Chamberlain), landing him a reckless driving charge. TK and Roimata soon discovered the attacker was Zac Smith (Mike Edward) and after he kidnapped Roimata for several days, he was arrested. TK and Roimata soon broke up after it turned out she was having an affair and he had brief romances with Harper Whitley (Ria Vandervis) and Emma Franklin (Amy Usherwood) before reconciling with Sarah after nearly 4 years. 2014 proved difficult for TK when Roimata died in an explosion, he fell in lust with Harper, and Sarah caught a mysterious illness and ended up dying as well. During Sarah's funeral, TK struggled to grieve over Sarah, blaming Boyd Rolleston (Sam Bunkall) for killing her during the operation. While trying to cope with the death of Sarah and slowly progressing into being a solo-parent, TK tried to kiss Harper but refused. He had sex with Lucy Rickman (Grace Palmer) but leaves him saying she's too young for him but hopes he finds someone who cares for him. TK later ended up falling for Kylie (Kerry-Lee Dewing), though the courtship proved difficult with the constant manipulations of his long time friend Pania Stevens (Bree Peters). TK later found out about Pania's manipulative actions and that she had murdered his best friend Caleb (Karlos Drinkwater), and had her arrested.

In September 2016, TK returned to Ferndale after spending time in Northland with Tillie and his family for a few weeks. TK brought back a young woman called Trina, who had helped him look after Tillie but also has a dangerous past. When Trina's obsessive ex-boyfriend Hayden turned up, he aggressively wanted her back. Instead, Trina began dating TK much to his disgust. It turned out Hayden was a part of the human trafficking industry, and Trina was one of the prostitutes he used to work with. Also involved was Lucy Rickman's father, Glenn Rickman, who has been dealing with Hayden financially. TK continued to try and protect Trina, but when she was taken by Hayden, TK decided to come to her rescue and ended up being brutally beaten down by a bunch of Hayden's employees. Trina saved TK's life, by telling Hayden that if he didn't kill him, she would be all his. When rushed to hospital, TK looked in an horrific condition, with his life in danger. Kylie had several arguments with Trina, however both of them decided that the choice was TK's. TK managed to make a quick recovery, and once he woke up immediately asked for Trina, which hurt Kylie. In the meantime, Hayden murdered one of Trina's best friends and one of his prostitutes, and framed Glen for the murder by putting the body in the boot of his car. Glen was arrested, but TK knew who was responsible. After TK announced his love for Trina, she didn't believe him, instead thinking that he loved Kylie. Trina ran out of the apartment and was chased by Kylie, who was trying to calm her down. As they were walking down the street, a van pulled up and kidnapped Trina while pushing Kylie to the ground. After days of wondering whether she was dead or alive, TK called her phone once more and Hayden answered. Hayden was in a car with an alive Trina, and threatened to kill her. Trina started to yell at Hayden, telling him that she hates him, and he assaulted her viciously. TK was furious. Trina was driven to Shortland Street Hospital, frantically by one of Hayden's prostitutes, and was in a bad state. In the 2016 Christmas Cliffhanger, TK did whatever he could to keep Trina alive but she didn't survive. After saying goodbye to Trina, he promised vengeance upon Hayden. TK called Hayden, challenging him to front up. Hayden was devastated to learn of Trina's death, even though he was the one responsible. At TK's apartment, a vengeful Hayden kidnapped Kylie and then faced an aggressive TK who punched him in the face. Hayden warned that if he touched him again, Kylie would be killed, and if he wanted Kylie, he had to go with him. TK submitted and drove with Hayden to a deserted area in the middle of nowhere. TK found Kylie tied up in the back of a van, and untied her. However, when Hayden pulled out a gun, they submitted once more. Hayden shot TK in the arm, and then shot (and killed) his colleague working with him which shocked Kylie. Hayden began to order TK to dig up his own grave while Kylie watched. TK refused to dig the grave for Kylie. An increasingly unhinged Hayden decided to kill TK instead, and keep Kylie for himself. It's the ultimate revenge for TK stealing Trina and letting her die. TK remained defiant, but he and Kylie fear imminent death. They both declared their mutual love. TK saw a chance for Kylie though, and agreed to dig his own grave. He waited for the right moment to strike back, and managed to get a gun from Hayden's dead sidekick, but Hayden kicked TK into unconsciousness before he could take action. When TK woke, he found himself lying in his own grave. He was enraged to hear Hayden's dangerous seduction of Kylie, and fearing Hayden will do to her what he did to Trina, TK fought to the death. They fought until they reached a nearby lake, where TK drowned Hayden much to Kylie's horror.

In 2021, he was in a relationship with Cece King after the latter lost her husband, Ben King in a fire. He was also an ambassador for men's health and prostate cancer screening. In 2022, ironically, he was diagnosed with prostate cancer himself, and was thrust into CEO of Shortland Street after Te Rongopai Rameka's insistence. Following the death of his father and finding out he has a half sister, TK attempts to reconnect with his son estranged son Sidney "Sid" Dutoit, however soon discovers that the new female ED register Gia Te Atakura is in fact Sid. TK navigates having a transsexual daughter. TK stays in the CEO role until the bushfires badly damage the hospital at Christmas time.

2023 commences with TK suspended from the CEO role as fallout from his handling of bushfire crisis. TK is soon assaulted by teenage wildchild Milo Cross and his friends. TK spends sometime recuperating with his family out in countryside whilst Cece accepts a promotion to Director of Nursing at Shortland Street. TK eventually returns to work as a consultant at Shortland Street’s renovated and reopened ED and Māori-Pacifica Clinic. In June, TK is offered a senior role in the newly established Māori Health Authority and decides to leave Shortland Street. During his last shift, he is gravely injured during Milo’s mass shooting at the hospital. With minimal chances for recovery, Cece makes the hard choice to turn off TK’s life support. On death’s door, TK is encouraged by the spirits of Sarah, Roimata, and Mo Hanna to fight for his life. TK shows signs of spontaneous life but is left with neurological and physical deficits. With the Health Authority’s job offer controversially rescinded and requiring significant rehabilitation, TK and Cece decide to leave Ferndale with Tillie so he can recover with the support of his extended family in the countryside.

== Character development ==
=== Relationship with Sarah Potts ===
In late 2006 TK fell in love with his boss Sarah Potts (Amanda Billing) following her boyfriend Craig (Renato Bartolomei) cheating on her with TK's cousin Huia (Nicola Kawana). The two ended up dating in the aftermath of the affair. Billing explained Sarah's conflict between Craig and TK, stating: "TK really loves Sarah and he is very patient and understanding with her where Craig isn’t. He accepts that she is difficult whereas Craig isn’t very patient with her and doesn’t understand her well at all." As 2006 ended, Sarah found herself torn between Craig and TK, eventually choosing and proposing to TK. Mitchell believed that TK was the love of Sarah's life, and stating that neither Andrew Solomon (Paolo Rotondo) or Craig; "Were the right one for Sarah; TK is the one." Mitchell also believed that TK was alright with Craig's attendance at the wedding, stating: "He was invited by Sarah, and he thinks it’s fair for Craig to attend the wedding. TK still has respect for Craig." Shortly into the relationship, Sarah began to lose trust in TK when she saw him sharing a drink with his ex lover Holly Makatea, Billing explained: "Sarah doesn’t know anything about their relationship. She has heard the name Holly mentioned before but she only knows her in passing as a social worker up on Q Road. TK has never told her about any previous relationship." Billing also stated: "The last thing Sarah expects to see is her boyfriend with a young gorgeous Maori Woman like Holly. She can tell they have a close connection and that makes her feel immediately uncomfortable and a little bit insecure." Sarah proposed to TK, feeling bad about her judgmental nature towards Holly but he declined as he feared Holly had given him HIV, Sarah promised to love him nonetheless and they got engaged. Tests later declared TK free of HIV. TK and Sarah wed in mid-2007, with Sarah initially cautious as she believed she may still love Craig. Sarah clashed with TK's family and Billing believed the arrival of TK's nephews to the house only further drove a wedge between her and the Samuels, stating: "Sarah is aware that when she went to the tangi she made some enemies, even though she was just trying to be straight up. She has been on the marae before, but she found that quite an alienating experience and she is prepared to feel that way again. She is definitely feeling apprehensive because they decided not to invite a lot of the whanau to the wedding and she realises she might get some flack for that. But she realises going to the Marae is important for TK’s sake and her relationship’s sake, and it is important she doesn’t make any more enemies. She is determined to put on a brave face and be nice and show she is capable of integrating into the family."

The two decided to start a family in late 2007 however TK soon voted against it and Sarah feared she had made a mistake marrying TK. However the two soon made up and decided to try for a family again. The couple found themselves pregnant but the baby would have been born ill, so the pregnancy was terminated. Sarah broke up with TK when Brooke Freeman (Beth Allen) purposely drove a wedge between the couple after falling madly in love with TK. Billing found the break-up uncomfortable to film, stating: "It has been very difficult to play, there are some days when I've thought she's just being a complete twit." She believed that Sarah found herself to be a "burden" to TK with her illness and it affected her "confidence and belief in herself". TK and Sarah set up a clinic in 2010 and Sarah later readmitted her love, causing a one-night stand before she left the country. Upon her unexpected arrival, Sarah announced she was pregnant with TK's child and she loved him. However TK had moved on with Roimata (Shavaughn Ruakere) and despite feelings for Sarah, announced it was over forever. Billing sympathised with Sarah during the ordeal, "My heart breaks for Sarah Potts because her bubble is well and truly burst. She has a fantasy in her head and when she comes home it's not what she expects." Billing acknowledged that TK and Roimata have good chemistry but praised TK and Sarah's possible rekindling saying; "Roimata and TK make a really good couple but Sarah and TK were really good too and wouldn't it be great for them to be a family?" In October 2012, following the revelation that her boyfriend of 8 months, Zac Smith (Mike Edward) had been cheating on her, Sarah found herself attracted once again to TK, who offered her support.

In August 2013, Sarah moved in with TK so that they could look after Tillie together following his separation from Roimata. Sarah's hopes for romance reignited but Billing hoped that it was mutual. Mitchell was "shocked" when he read the storyline and hoped that their relationship "would be different" than before. Sarah struggled to tell TK her true feelings as Billing believed "it'll ruin the friendship that they have .... Sarah doesn't imagine he has romantic feelings for her." In September 2013, Sarah and TK finally reconciled. Sarah travelled to America for several months on a MS trial and in the interim, TK developed feelings for her friend Harper Whitley (Ria Vandervis) but stayed committed. However Sarah's trial turned out not to have worked and TK ended up turning to violence, Mitchell believed that, "His violent reaction definitely doesn't go unnoticed and it's going to cause problems for him and his family." In early 2014 producers decided to kill off the character of Sarah as they didn't think fans would believe TK dating any other character with the possibility of Sarah returning. Billing believed the way the relationship was written in her final storyline was "sweet" and well "crafted", as she believed he was her true soul mate. The storyline saw Sarah fight to discover the cure of a killer illness much to the annoyance of TK, whom disagreed with her ambition. Mitchell believed that this, "pisses him off to tell the truth. She's a mother; she should be there spending time with her family. She's got MS herself and she's not really taking care of herself." Billing believed the storyline saw a development in the relationship, "Their relationship changes because of their involvement in this situation. That tenacity can be really annoying for (TK) but he knows that it results in good things for other people." The storyline saw the two become engaged once again. Sarah ended up finding a cure, only to succumb to the illness herself. Storylines following Sarah's death saw TK embrace being a solo-dad, with Mitchell believing, "When one relationship closes, another opens up ... Since Sarah died, the dark heaviness that TK experienced with being so depended on by his sick partner has gone and, naturally, he's stepped up to being a dad."

== Reception ==
TK has proved favourable to female fans and was labelled by the official Shortland Street website as one of the most recognisable faces on the show. In 2008, a mother who was a huge fan of Shortland Street, named her child after the character. TK and his cousin Huia (Nicola Kawana), were portrayed as "middle class" Māori and fulfilled a certain demographic that had been left open after the departure of the Hudson family. At the time, besides the Samuels, the only two other Māori characters had very little to do with cultural issues. Eti Kawaka (Isaac Bell) was departing the soap and Jay Copeland's (Jaime Passier-Armtrong) storylines dealt more often with her sexuality. Because of this, the shows producers ensured TK and Huia appeared, "staunch" about who they were as Māori people. Reviewers predicted that how writers dealt with TK and Huia would directly affect the Māori audience share of Shortland Street. Following the murder of Huia in October 2006, the show came under criticism for its lack of Māori perspective, however producer Jason Daniel defended the move and assured the persecutors that TK remained as one of the shows most popular characters. During a speech at the show's 15th anniversary, the Prime Minister Helen Clark satirically suggested that the question of whether Sarah would marry TK was a major issue. The characters popularity dwindled off by 2014, with The Spinoff writer suggesting that Mitchell's off screen persona was the reason behind the attitude change of fans.

The conclusion to the 2011 90-minute episode which saw TK ditch Roimata at the altar to see his daughter's birth, only to end up saving Hunter (Lee Donoghue) from a car crash, were highly praised by reviewers. It became the highest watched episode of the year, with an audience of 834,200. The love triangle between TK, Roimata and Sarah was listed by Television New Zealand as one of the top moments of the 2011 season. In 2013, Television New Zealand named TK and Sarah's reconciliation as the 7th best moment of the season.
