= Peter Mochrie =

Australian actor

- Born: 23 March 1959 (age 67); Sydney, New South Wales, Australia
- Occupation: Actor
- Spouse: Sally Mochrie
- Children: 1

Peter Mochrie (born 23 March 1959) is an Australian actor whose career spans over forty five years in the industry, primarily featuring in television serial dramas such as The Restless Years, Water Rats and Janet King. He has also worked in New Zealand, where he spent six years as Dr. Callum McKay in the soap opera Shortland Street.

== Biography ==
Born on 23 March 1959, Mochrie acting started at the age of 13 when he appeared in a play at Knox Grammar School, where he completed his schooling in 1976. He is also a producer of Fine Films and Profiles, presenter, teacher of 'The Art of Presenting' and an Auctioneer for McGrath Estate Agents.

In 1978, he received his first big break appearing in TV soap opera The Restless Years as Ric Moran. He played this role for two years and soon caught the attention of other TV producers, and appearing in serials including Holiday Island, Neighbours, Butterfly Island, and Sons And Daughters, and Alex Buzo's made-for-TV film Rooted for the Australian Broadcasting Corporation (ABC). He also appeared in two movies, Winter of Our Dreams and Just in Time and on stage in The Shifting Heart, The Shrew, Maids of the Mill, The Bear and Fool for Love.

In 1987, Mochrie was accepted into the National Institute of Dramatic Art (NIDA). After graduation, he had roles in shows such as Home and Away, G.P., Time Trax, The Resting Place and Blue Heelers

He played John ‘Knocker’ Harrison in Water Rats, the male lead Steve Hayden in Murder Call, Mark Kelman in Mighty Morphin Power Rangers: The Movie, Michael Allen in Frauds, Bill Albright in The Cooks and Rick Fontaine in the award-winning children's series, Cybergirl.

Mochrie co-founded the Roar Theatre Company (NSW) and for ten years he was a regular tutor at NIDA as well as appearing in plays such as Spinning Into Butter at the Ensemble, Pesthouse for The NIDA Company and directing Stuck Love at the Newtown Theatre (NSW). He also produced and co-wrote the short films Check Out and Film Lovers.

In July 2006, Mochrie accepted the offer to play Dr. Callum McKay on the New Zealand television series Shortland Street which he played for six years, appearing in 637 episodes. He had previously travelled to Auckland three years earlier to film Lucy; the story of Lucille Ball for CBS .

In 2010, Mochrie played Vernon Bramwell in the New Zealand film, Predicament, and Officer Eastwood in the Bollywood film, Love Has No Language. He has also done voice-over work on both sides of the Tasman, as well as more recently, Los Angeles. Upon returning to Australia in 2013, he appeared as Geoff Hadley in Janet King for the ABC and started 2014 playing Fraser Collins in In Your Dreams for Southern Star. His role as Sam Dovinic in The Health and Safety of All helped the film win the silver medal at the 2015 New York Festival. Mochrie returned to the Ensemble Theatre in early 2016 to play Carl Kretzmer in David Williamson's Jack of Hearts and to television with roles in both the miniseries House of Bond on the Nine Network and Blue Murder: Killer Cop for Channel 7. He also reprised the role of Geoff Hadley in season 3 of Janet King for the ABC.

== Acting teacher ==
Since 1997 Mochrie has been teaching "Introduction to Screen Acting" for NIDA's Open Program. He is also a regular tutor of acting & presentation skills. He has taught his course 'The Art of Presenting' at the Sydney Drama School, the Australian Institute of Performing Arts, McGrath Estate Agents, Westpac, LJ Hooker, The Local Project, QBE, Laing & Simmons, Raine & Horne, Screenwise, The University of N.S.W. and the Actors Centre Australia.

== Personal life ==
Born in Sydney, Australia, he married for the first time in 2010 at the age of 50. His spouse is Sally Jane Mochrie, and they have a son, Cade.

== Filmography ==
=== Film ===
Title	Year	Role	Type
1982	Winter of Our Dreams	Tim	Feature film
1985	Rooted	Richard	TV movie
1992	The Resting Place	Grant	TV movie
1992	Frauds	Michael Allen	Feature film
1995	Mighty Morphin Power Rangers: The Movie	Mr. Kelman	Feature film
2003	Lucy	Don Sharpe	TV movie
2008	Love Has No Language	Officer Eastwood	Feature film

=== Television ===
Title	Year	Role	Type
1979–81	The Restless Years	Ric Moran	TV series
1981–82	Holiday Island	Tony Zackarakis	TV series
1985	Neighbours	Peter Kirk	TV series
1985	Butterfly Island	Bob Gallio	TV series
1986	Sons and Daughters	Justin Slade	TV series
1990	Home and Away	Doug	TV series
1991	G.P.	Greg Mitchum	TV series
1994	Blue Heelers	Col Monroe	TV series
1994	Time Trax	Paco	TV series
1996–97	Water Rats	Detective Sergeant John "Knocker" Harrison	TV series
1997–2000	Murder Call	Detective Steve Hayden	TV series
2001–02	Cybergirl	Rick Fontaine	TV series
2004	The Cooks	Bill Ulbright	TV series
2010	Predictable	Vernon Bramwell	
2006–12	Shortland Street	Callum McKay	TV series
2015	In Your Dreams	Fraser Collins	TV series
2017	House of Bond	Banker	TV miniseries
2014–17	Janet King	Geoff Hadley	TV series
2017	Blue Murder: Killer Cop	Auctioneer	TV miniseries
2021	Akoni	Robin	
	Whirid Web Series	Professor Ian Maynard	Post-production
