= Shavaughn Ruakere =

New Zealand actress and television presenter

Shavaughn Ruakere is a New Zealand actress and television presenter. She is known for her roles as presenter on the children's TV show What Now and for playing the role of Roimata Ngatai on the prime-time soap opera Shortland Street.

== Early life and education ==
Shavaughn Ruakere was born in Hāwera, but lived in Ōpunake until her family moved to New Plymouth when she was eight years old.

She attended university in Auckland before relocating to Christchurch for a television presenter role on What Now.

== Career ==
Ruakere started out as a presenter for popular children's television shows such as What Now in New Zealand in the late nineties and later on ITV' s SMTV Live in 2003. Her acting career began with minor roles in the films River Queen (2005) and Sione's Wedding (2006). From 2011 to 2014, Ruakere played the character of Roimata Ngatai on Shortland Street, her most notable television role to date. In 2018, Ruakere was a contestant on Dancing with the Stars. She and dancing partner Enrique Johns made it to the grand final, where they were first of the four teams to be eliminated. In 2022, she became the host of New Zealand's edition of FBoy Island.

== Personal life ==
Ruakere is a New Zealander of Māori descent (Te Āti Awa and Taranaki descent). Ruakere was in a committed relationship with Clark Gayford before they split and he went on to date and eventually marry NZ Prime Minister Jacinda Ardern.

== Filmography ==
=== Film ===
Year	Title	Role	Notes
2005	River Queen	Maori Tribal Chief's Wife	
2006	Sione's Wedding	Dream Latifah 1	
2006	Discount Taxi Driver	Robin Slade	Short film
2009	The Warning	Rihanna	Short film

=== Television ===
Year	Title	Role	Notes
1997–2001	What Now	Herself	
2003	SMTV Live	Herself	
2005	The Tem Show	Herself	
2008	The Jaquie Brown Diaries	Herself	
2009	The Cult	Angela	
2010	Legend of the Seeker	Mistress Sara	
2010–2016	7 Days	Herself	
2011	Brown Bruthaz	Jasmine	
2011–2014, 2023	Shortland Street	Roimata Ngatai	
2013	Best Bits	Herself	
2014	Flat3	Mascot Lady	Web series
2015	When We Go To War	Awa Kokiri	
2017	Darryl: An Outward Bound Story	Sally	Web miniseries
2018	Dancing with the Stars	Herself	
2021–2022	Power Rangers Dino Fury	Dr. Lani Akana	
2022	FBoy Island NZ	Host	as Shav Rurakere
2023	Power Rangers Cosmic Fury	Dr. Lani Akana	
2025	Tangata Pai	Hinewai	Main cast
