= Amanda Billing =

New Zealand actress (born 1976)

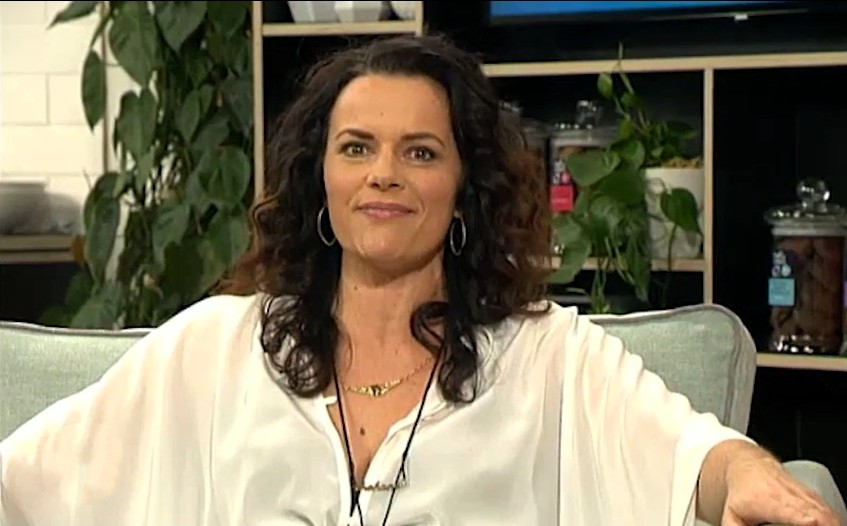
- Billing in 2016
- Born: Amanda Joselyn Marie Billing; 12 April 1976 (age 50); New Zealand
- Occupation: Actress
- Years active: 2000–Present

Amanda Billing (born 12 April 1976 in New Zealand) is a New Zealand actress best known for her role as Doctor Sarah Potts on New Zealand soap opera Shortland Street.

== Biography ==
Billing grew up in Masterton, and spent her university years in Christchurch. After graduating with a Bachelor of Arts with 1st Class Honours in Geography from the University of Canterbury, she trained at the Christchurch College of Education and became a high school teacher.

Billing was involved in drama throughout her teaching years and has acted in a few amateur stage productions including Cloud Nine and The Country Wife. She has worked at several schools throughout Auckland teaching Geography, English and Social Studies, most recently at Rangitoto College.

== Credits ==
=== Television ===
- Shortland Street - (Sarah Potts) - Core Cast 2004–2014, Guest 2023 South Pacific Pictures
- Find Me a Māori Bride - (Crystal Leslie) - Main Cast (2015–present)
- Newsworthy - (Herself) - Guest Cast (2015)
- The Cul de Sac - (Rose's mother) (2015)
- The Brokenwood Mysteries - (Brenda White) (2016)
- Power Rangers Ninja Steel - (Principal Hastings) (2017–2018)
- Kid Sister - (Keren) (2022-2023)
- Under the Vines - (Yvonne) (2024-)

=== Theatre ===
- Dust Pilgrim - Multiple Characters - 2018 - Red Leap Theatre (dir. Julie Nolan)
- Boys Will Be Boys - 'Astrid' - 2016 - Silo Theatre (dir. Sophie Roberts)
- The Book of Everything - 'Mother' - 2016 - Silo Theatre (dir. Sophie Roberts)
- Cabaret - 'Sally Bowles' - 2010 - Auckland Theatre Company (dir. Michael Hurst)
- The Threepenny Opera - 'Polly Peachum' - 2008 - Silo Theatre and The Large Group (dir. Michael Hurst)
- Cloud Nine - 'Edward' (Act I), 'Victoria' (Act II) - 2004 - Silo Theatre (dir. Edwin Wright)
- As You Like It - 'Rosalind' - 2003/2004 - Legacy Theatre Co. (dir. Tim Flavell)
- Home Ground - 'Margaret' - 2003 - Auckland Performing Arts Centre (dir. Carla Martel)
- The Country Wife - 'The Country Wife' - 2003 - Silo Theatre (dir. Heath Jones)

=== Voice Work ===
- George FM - various - 2002–2003
- Power Rangers Cosmic Fury - Bajillia Naire - 2023

=== Other ===
- Auckland based singer (lyric Soprano), dancer

=== Video game ===
- Path of Exile - 'Oshabi' - 2020
