= Benjamin Mitchell (actor) =

New Zealand actor

- Born: 7 July 1979 (age 47); New Zealand
- Occupation: Actor
- Years active: 1990 – present
- Spouse: Kate Mitchell (m. 2020)
- Children: Mila Mitchell, Sofia Mitchell, Nico Mitchell

Benjamin Mitchell (born 7 July 1979), is a New Zealand actor best known for his role as Dr. TK Samuels in the soap opera Shortland Street.

== Biography ==
Mitchell was born and raised in Hamilton. He is the oldest of three children, and left home at 15. He is of Māori descent, of Tainui iwi (tribe). He attended secondary school at St John's College, Hamilton, New Zealand.

A personal trainer and winner of Mr. New Zealand in 1999, Mitchell moved to Auckland in 2000 to pursue an acting career. His first role was as a reporter on Shortland Street in 2000. This was followed by parts on shows including Power Rangers: Ninja Storm and Outrageous Fortune.

In 2006, Mitchell joined the cast of Shortland Street as young doctor TK Samuels. Described as one of Shortland Street's "most recognisable faces," Mitchell has gained "great popularity throughout New Zealand, especially with female viewers."

In 2007 Mitchell starred alongside Bollywood actress Celina Jaitley in the film Love Has No Language, a "big budget" New Zealand-Australian co-production released in 2008. He also appeared in the independent New Zealand feature I'm Not Harry Jenson.

Mitchell speaks fluent Te Reo Māori, and lent his support to Māori Language Week campaigns in 2006 and 2008.

Since 2023, Mitchell has worked in construction.

== Personal life ==
Mitchell has three children with partner Kate - daughters Sofia and Mila, and son, Nico. Kate was diagnosed with Stage 4 cancer in 2026.

== Filmography ==
- Father (1990)
- Mr. Nice Guy (1997)
- Reporter (2000)
- Stingers (TV series 2002)
- Power Rangers Ninja Storm (TV series 2003)
- Outrageous Fortune (TV series 2005)
- An Aggressive Gift (short 2008)
- Love Has No Language (2008)
- The Shoe Box (short 2009)
- I'm Not Harry Jenson. (2009)
- Curry Munchers (2011)
- Shortland Street (TV series 2006–2023)
- The Hobbit: The Desolation of Smaug (2013)
- Pork Pie (film) (2017)
