= Shimpal Lelisi =

Niuean actor and TV presenter

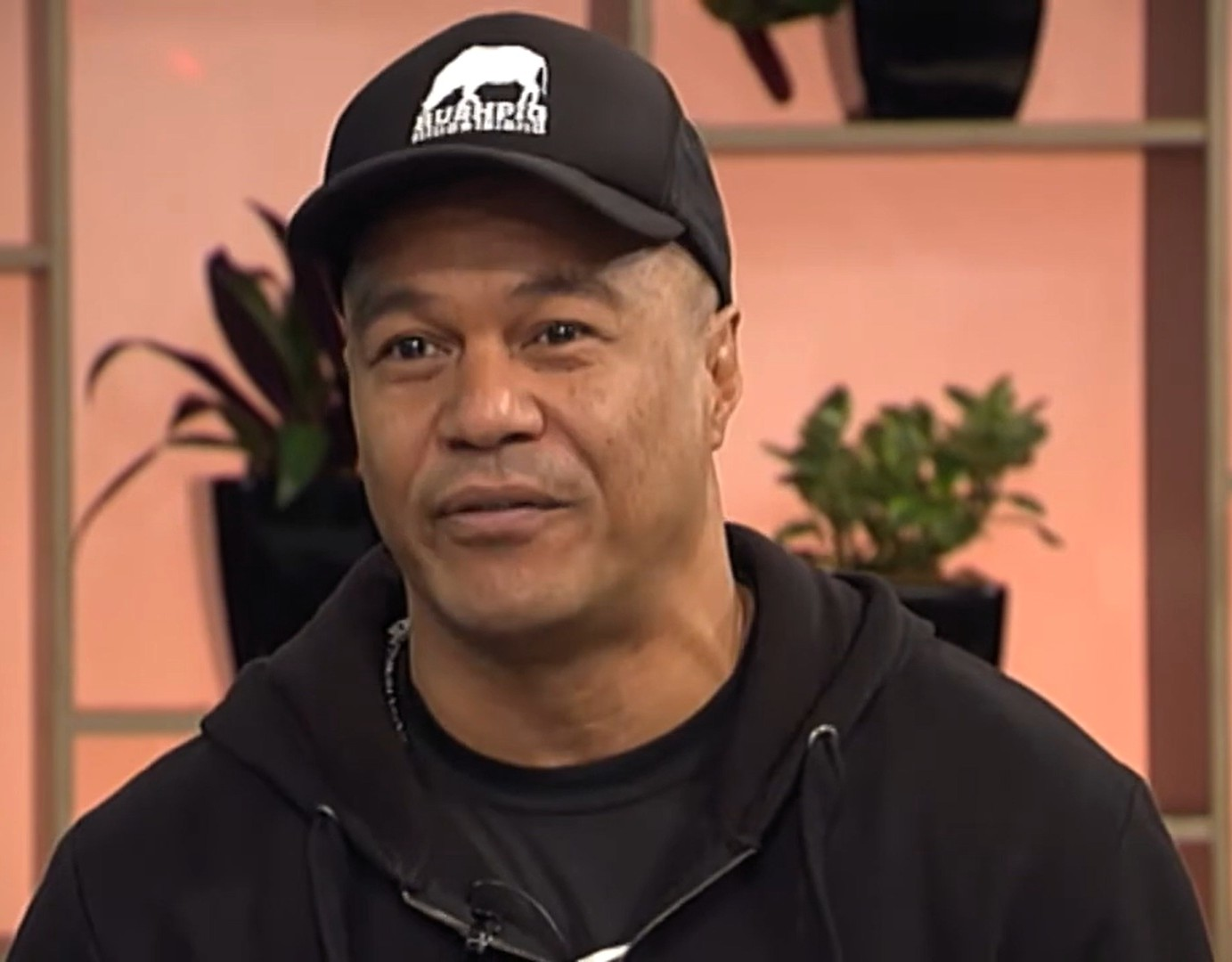
- Shimpal in 2018
- Born: Liku, Niue
- Occupation: Actor/TV Presenter

Shimpal Lelisi (born c. 1973) is a Niuean-New Zealand actor and TV presenter, best known as one of the members of the Naked Samoans. He is one of the creators of bro'Town, and starred in the comedy films Sione's Wedding and Sione's 2: Unfinished Business.

== Biography ==
Born in Liku, Niue, Shimpal came to New Zealand at the age of four. He began acting at an early age, taking part in school productions. He enrolled in Toi Whakaari to improve his drama skills, but struggled and was asked to leave. In 1998 he formed the Naked Samoans with David Fane, Mario Gaoa, and Oscar Kightley, performing plays about Pacific people growing up in New Zealand. Shimpal has since stayed with the group in later productions. The latest of the show was in December 2006 entitled Naked Samoans Go Home (Again).

In 1999, Shimpal joined the core cast of the soap opera Shortland Street, playing the role of Nurse Louie Iosefa. He was fired after six months after taking time off to do a theatre production. However, his most successful involvement with television has been bro'Town. Shimpal is credited as both voice actor and writer for the animated series with the three other original Naked Samoans. In 2006, he co-starred in the comedy film Sione's Wedding. In 2012 he co-starred in Sione's 2: Unfinished Business. Shimpal also works as a TV reporter for Tagata Pasifika (which co-stars Robbie Magasiva).

In 2014 he was fined $900 and banned from driving for six months for drunk-driving.

Lelisi was a castaway on the 2022 series of the New Zealand reality television show Celebrity Treasure Island.

In 2025 Lelisi joined the reformed Naked Samoans for The Last Temptation of the Naked Samoans.

== Filmography ==
=== Film ===
Film	Year	Role
Sione's 2: Unfinished Business	2012	Sefa
Sione's Wedding	2006	Sefa

=== Television ===
Series	Year	Role
Radiradirah	2010	Tony/Andy the Android
Tagata Pasifika	2006–present	Presenter
bro'Town	2004–2009	Valea Pepelo (voice)
Shortland Street	1999–2000	Nurse Louie Iosefa
