= Pua Magasiva =

New Zealand actor (1980–2019)

- Born: 10 August 1980; Apia, Samoa
- Died: 11 May 2019 (aged 38); Wellington, New Zealand
- Education: St Patrick's College
- Occupation: Actor
- Years active: 1999–2019
- Spouses: Kourtney Ngaamo (m. 2012; div. 2015) Elizabeth Sadler (m. 2018)
- Children: 1
- Relatives: Robbie Magasiva (brother)

Pua Magasiva (10 August 1980 – 11 May 2019) was a Samoan-born New Zealand actor, best known for his roles as Shane Clarke, the Red Ranger from Power Rangers Ninja Storm, and Vinnie Kruse in the soap opera Shortland Street, both co-starring with Sally Martin. He was also one of the co-hosts of radio station Flava.

== Biography ==
Magasiva was born in Apia, Samoa, but raised in Wellington, New Zealand, since he was two years old. He was the younger brother of actor Robbie Magasiva. It was Robbie who inspired Magasiva to become an actor, after being signed up with an acting agency and acquiring small roles. In 1999, he made a minor appearance on Shortland Street as Elvis Iosefa, a relative of Louie Iosefa (played by Shimpal Lelisi). Then in 2001, he landed a role in a six-part Māori language television series called Aroha. The series went on to screen at the International Film Festival in Auckland, receiving critical praise.

Finally in 2003, Magasiva made the leading roles in both Power Rangers: Ninja Storm (which included a guest appearance by Robbie in one episode) and Shortland Street. He stayed on Shortland Street until 2006. By then, he played the title character in the comedy film Sione's Wedding, which starred his brother Robbie and other members of the Naked Samoans. In 2007, he appeared in the horror film 30 Days of Night.

In 2009, Magasiva made guest appearances in Diplomatic Immunity and Outrageous Fortune. In 2011, he returned as Vinnie Kruse on Shortland Street.

Outside his work on television and film, Magasiva acted in theatre, including Two Days in Dream in 2003 (written by Mario Gaoa, member of the Naked Samoans, and directed by Colin Mitchell). Another play that he acted in was Sex with Strangers, which was written by Mitchell, though Two Days in Dream was well received by critics. In 2008, he co-starred with brother Robbie in the play Where We Once Belonged. Magasiva also appeared in nine Lift Plus commercials in New Zealand and also took over his brother's role as the Small Blacks TV News presenter opposite Conrad Snakey Smith. In January 2017, he helped pull a man from his burning car.

He was a co-presenter on the Flava morning radio show from 2015 to 2018. He resigned from the station after a third drunk-driving charge. He left Shortland Street that same year.

=== Domestic assault conviction and suicide ===
On 18 December 2019, a name suppression order was lifted, revealing that Magasiva had been convicted of domestic assault against his wife in April, 15 days before his death. He was sentenced to 70 hours of community work and six months of supervision. According to his widow, during a tell-all photoshoot after his death, Magasiva had engaged in a regular pattern of abuse, concussed her three times, and threatened to harm her, himself, or their daughter, if she went to the police. She claimed to have later found a diary belonging to him showing "pages... full of haunting images, tortured thoughts and self-loathing" and admitting that he had always been violent and angry. On 11 May 2019, Magasiva died of a suspected suicide in a hotel room in Wellington. His widow stated that he attacked her in a drunken rage the night he died.

== Filmography ==
=== Film ===
| Year | Title | Role | Notes |
|---|---|---|---|
| 2001 | The Other Side of Heaven | Finau | |
| 2001 | Aidiko Insane | Phoebus | |
| 2004 | Haka & Siva | Siva | Short film |
| 2006 | Sione's Wedding | Sione | |
| 2006 | Uso | Ranatonga | Short film |
| 2007 | 30 Days of Night | Malekai Hamm | |
| 2010 | Matariki | Sergeant Wolfgram | |
| 2011 | Panic at Rock Island | TK | |
| 2012 | Sione's 2: Unfinished Business | Sione | Final film role |

=== Television ===
| Year | Title | Role | Notes |
|---|---|---|---|
| 1999; 2003–2006; 2011–2018 | Shortland Street | Elvis Iosefa (1999); Nurse Vinnie Kruse (2003–2006, 2011–2018) | 308 episodes |
| 2002 | Revelations - The Initial Journey | Greg Davies | Episode: "Unfinished Business" |
| 2003 | Power Rangers Ninja Storm | Shane Clarke / Red Wind Ranger | 38 episodes |
| 2004 | Power Rangers Dino Thunder | Shane Clarke / Red Wind Ranger | 2 episodes |
| 2004 | What Now? | Himself | "Episode #23.2" |
| 2009 | Diplomatic Immunity | The Niu | Episode: "Boris the Spider" |
| 2009 | Outrageous Fortune | Issac | 5 episodes |
| 2011 | East West 101 | Ned Rewiti | Episode: "Ned Rewiti" |
| 2013–2019 | Small Blacks TV | Himself | |
| 2014 | Flat3 | Winston | Episode: "The Game" |
