= Magasiva =

Magasiva is a surname. Notable people with the surname include:

- Pua Magasiva (1980 – 2019), New Zealand actor
- Robbie Magasiva (born 1972), Samoan-New Zealander actor, Pua's brother
