= Naked Samoans =

New Zealand comedy group

The Naked Samoans
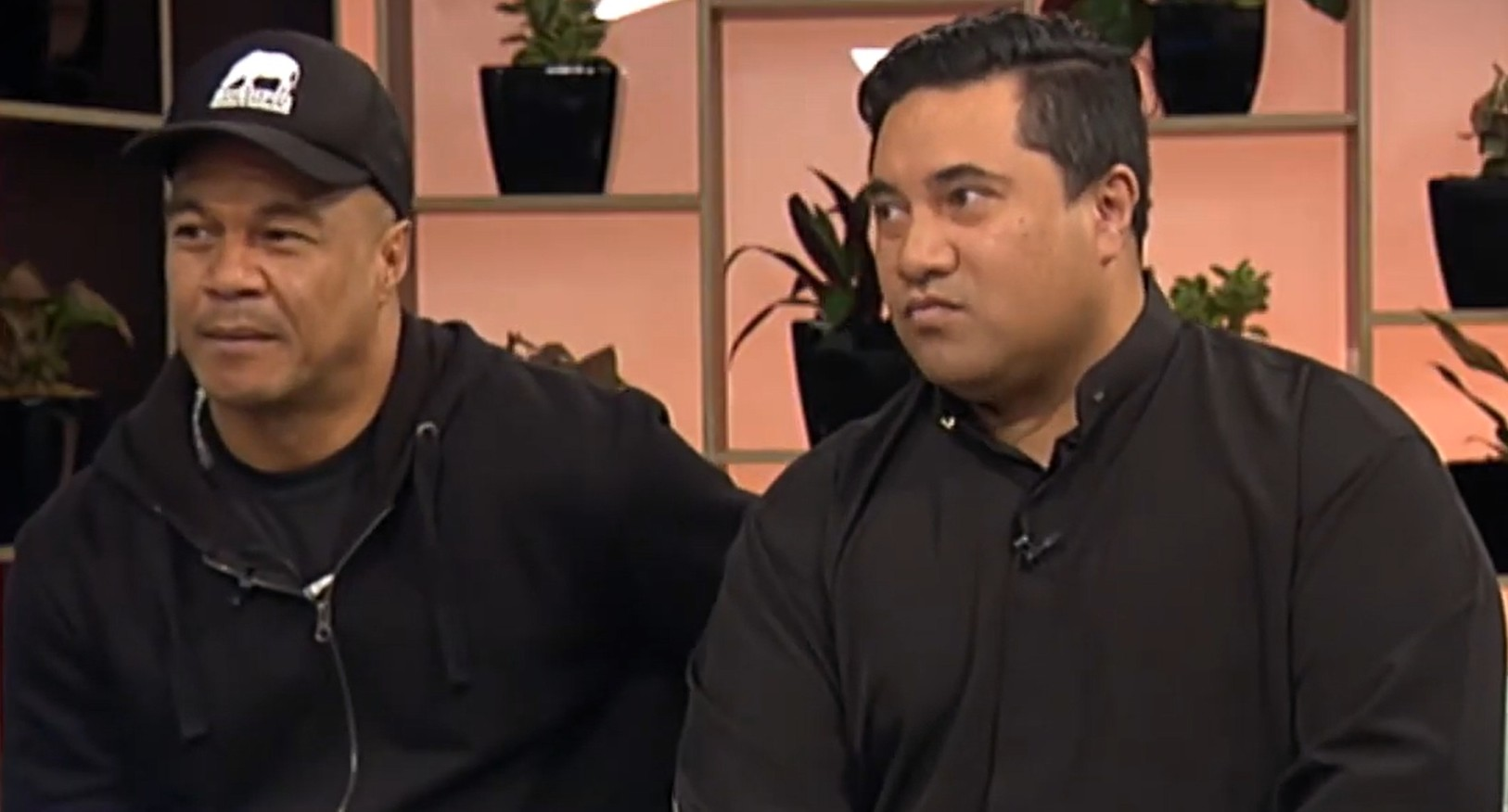
- Left to right: Shimpal Lelisi, Heto Ah Hi in 2018

Comedy career
- Years active: 1998–present
- Medium: Stage, television, film
- Genre: Social humor
- Members: David Fane; Mario Gaoa; Shimpal Lelisi; Oscar Kightley; Robbie Magasiva; Iaheto Ah Hi

The Naked Samoans is a New Zealand comedy group made up of Polynesian entertainers, most of whom are Samoan. The group performs social humour and satire that attracts a broad audience, especially among white New Zealanders, without sacrificing the group's Pacific Island identity. The group has gained success in both television and film projects as well as in theatre, which remains their primary base in entertainment. The members of this group are David Fane, Mario Gaoa, Shimpal Lelisi, Oscar Kightley, Robbie Magasiva and Iaheto Ah Hi.

== Early beginnings and work ==
The group—consisting of Fane, Gaoa, Lelisi, and Kightley—began in 1998 with a stage production entitled Naked Samoans Talk about Their Knives (a parody of a New Zealand film Topless Women Talk About Their Lives). The show was a sellout success in several cities across New Zealand. It led to a series of successful theatre productions and greater media attention. Their material on such subjects as racism and violence were surprising to some, but nonetheless their base grew. Robbie Magasiva and Iaheto Ah Hi joined the group in January 2001 and have remained members since.

In 2003 they performed Naked Samoans Go Home at Downstage Theatre in Wellington and the Herald in Auckland.

Between 2004 and 2006, the Naked Samoans were involved in two major projects. In television, the original members created the animated show bro'Town, New Zealand's first adult animated show. It received critical praise and numerous awards from the country's domestic entertainment industry. In film, most of the group members starred in the comedy film Sione's Wedding, known as Samoan Wedding in other regions such as North America, co-written by Oscar Kightley and James Griffin. The movie became one of the highest-grossing Kiwi films of 2006, making over $NZ3 million. However, it also got media attention as being a victim of unauthorized distribution, resulting in some loss of potential revenue. Sione's Wedding was later released in Australia and distributed in the United States under a new title Samoan Wedding.

After a successful 2006, the Naked Samoans returned to their roots and performed with their new production, Naked Samoans Go Home (Again), in December.

In 2018 for a 20-year anniversary celebration the Naked Samoans teamed up with the Pasifika theatre company The Conch to present a show called Naked Samoans Do Magic, commissioned by the Auckland Arts Festival (co-produced by The Conch). The production had a season from March 22 - 25, 2018 at the Civic Theatre in the Auckland Arts Festival. One of the reviews states, "While hinting at many of the social problems that affect Aotearoa and the world, the production celebrates the transformative power of magic and of theatre, leading to a sense of optimism and hope."

== Filmography ==
- Sione's Wedding
- Sione's 2: Unfinished Business
- bro'Town
