= Sione's 2: Unfinished Business =

2012 New Zealand comedy film

- New Zealand theatrical release poster
- Directed by: Simon Bennett
- Written by: James Griffin; Oscar Kightley
- Produced by: John Barnett; Paul Davis
- Starring: Oscar Kightley; Shimpal Lelisi; Robbie Magasiva; Iaheto Ah Hi; Dave Fane; Teuila Blakely; Madeleine Sami
- Cinematography: Marty Smith
- Edited by: Paul Lear; Gwen Norcliffe
- Music by: Don McGlashan
- Production companies: South Pacific Pictures; New Zealand Film Commission
- Distributed by: Sony Pictures
- Release date: 19 January 2012
- Running time: 92 minutes
- Country: New Zealand
- Language: English
- Budget: Unknown
- Box office: $723,000

Sione's 2: Unfinished Business is a 2012 New Zealand comedy film and the sequel to the hugely successful 2006 film Sione's Wedding. It was produced by John Barnett and Paul Davis, directed by Simon Bennett, co-produced by South Pacific Pictures and New Zealand Film Commission with music by Don McGlashan and written by Oscar Kightley and James Griffin. The film stars Oscar Kightley, Shimpal Lelisi, Robbie Magasiva, Iaheto Ah Hi, Dave Fane, Teuila Blakely, Madeleine Sami, Pua Magasiva, Mario Gaoa, Nathaniel Lees, David Van Horn, Ayşe Tezel, Dimitri Baveas, Kirk Torrance and Te Kohe Tuhaka. Sione's 2: Unfinished Business was filmed at Auckland, New Zealand. The film was theatrically released on 19 January 2012, by Sony Pictures and was released on DVD and Blu-ray on 13 June 2012, by Sony Pictures Home Entertainment. The film has received mixed reviews from critics and has grossed $723,000 in New Zealand. This was Pua Magasiva's final film appearance seven years before his death on 11 May 2019.

== Plot ==
Albert and Tania are now happily married, but cannot quite seal the deal with a baby. While Sefa and Leilani have got two kids, they are not married despite Sefa's proposal. Stanley is now a trainee Deacon in the Future Church, Michael has moved to Australia, and Bolo ditched his job with Sefa's failing business to work for Sione. As adulthood drives them apart, a crisis brings them back together: when Bolo disappears, the Minister gathers up the boys to find him, somewhere, in the world's largest Polynesian city.

== Cast ==
- Oscar Kightley as Albert. Having moved with Tania to Glenfield, he is struggling to find himself away from his friends.
- Shimpal Lelisi as Sefa. He has been engaged to Leilani for five years and has two children but is struggling to connect with her.
- Robbie Magasiva as Michael. He has been living overseas since the first film and returns to his disappointed friends.
- Iaheto Ah Hi as Stanley. He has found religion after embracing a cult like church.
- Dave Fane as Paul
- Teuila Blakely as Leilani
- Madeleine Sami as Tania
- Pua Magasiva as Sione
- Mario Gaoa as Eugene
- Nathaniel Lees as Minister
- David Van Horn as Derek
- Ayşe Tezel as Maria
- Dimitri Baveas as Tony
- Kirk Torrance as Cardinal Hoani
- Te Kohe Tuhaka as Marcel

== Production ==
=== Development ===
Writers; Oscar Kightley and James Griffin first proposed a sequel to Sione's Wedding in 2006 but no plans came to fruition. They decided that they wanted to focus on other projects but the idea remained appealing and after rounding up the original cast, the two decided to write the film. Producer John Barnett was always keen on a sequel but Griffin and Kightley needed more time to decide and after toying with several ideas, decided to have the same characters in the same situation, only five years later. As Kightley was friends with the actors and a star of the film himself, the cast spent a lot of time developing the characters. Whilst fundraising for the first film took 4 years, the sequel only took 15 months. In March 2011, it was confirmed that filming was soon to begin on a sequel, titled: "Sione's Wedding II" that was to be released in January 2012. Filming began in April 2011. The cast found filming the sequel to be a lot more fun than it was filming the original, partly as they were comfortable in what they were doing. In April it was confirmed the film was to be written by Griffin and Kightley and may deal with the subject of death.

=== Filming ===
The film was shot around Auckland, including areas in Auckland's St Kevins Arcade, Karangahape Rd, Ponsonby Rd and Grey Lynn.

=== Casting ===
On 12 March 2011, it was announced that Oscar Kightley would play the lead role in the film, while Shimpal Lelisi, Robbie Magasiva, Iaheto Ah Hi and Dave Fane were in early talks to join the cast. On 13 April, Teuila Blakely, Madeleine Sami, Pua Magasiva, Mario Gaoa, Nathaniel Lees, David Van Horn and Ayşe Tezel were also in final talks to join the film, Dimitri Baveas was added to the cast, playing Tony and on 14 August, Kirk Torrance and Te Kohe Tuhaka joined the cast of the film, playing Cardinal Hoani and Marcel.

=== Music ===
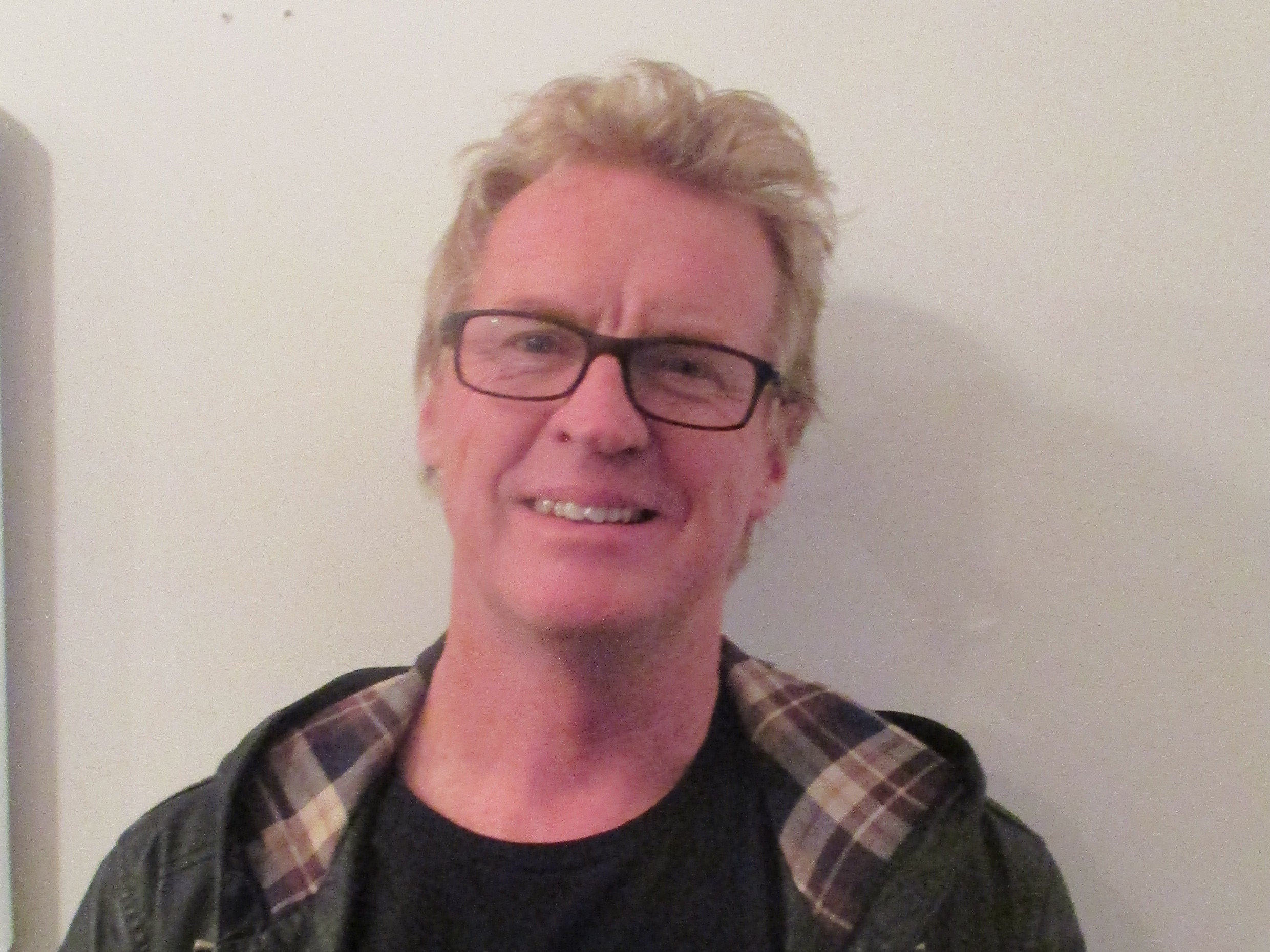
Don McGlashan scored the music for the film and on its soundtrack.

Don McGlashan scored the music for the film and on its soundtrack. The soundtrack also contains "I Promise" performed by Savage and Ria, "Gotta Go" performed by Mareko, "Saturday" performed by Home Brew, "Sideline" performed by David Dallas and Che Fu, "Bomb!” performed by PNC, "Say Yeah" performed by P-Money, David Dallas and Aaradhna, "O Le Atua Lava" performed by Mz J and Deacon Kelemete Ta'ale, “Everything” performed by P-Money and Vince Harder, "Music (Makes the World Go Around)” performed by Frisko and Aaradhna, "Too Shy" performed by Devolo, "Them Eyes" performed by Mareko and J Williams, "Wild Out (Chooo Hooo)” performed by Savage, Baby Bash and Angel Dust, "Think You've Got It All" performed by Vince Harder, "This Is Love" performed by Monsta and J Boog and "All The Days" performed by Fredricks Brown.

== Release ==
=== Marketing ===
The film's trailer debuted online in July 2011.

=== Theatrical release ===
Sione's 2: Unfinished Business was theatrically released on 19 January 2012, by Sony Pictures.

=== International releases ===
- New Zealand - 19 January 2012
- Fiji - 26 January 2012
- Australia - 1 March 2012

=== Home media ===
Sione's 2: Unfinished Business was released on DVD and Blu-ray on 13 June 2012, by Sony Pictures Home Entertainment.

== Reception ==
=== Critical response ===
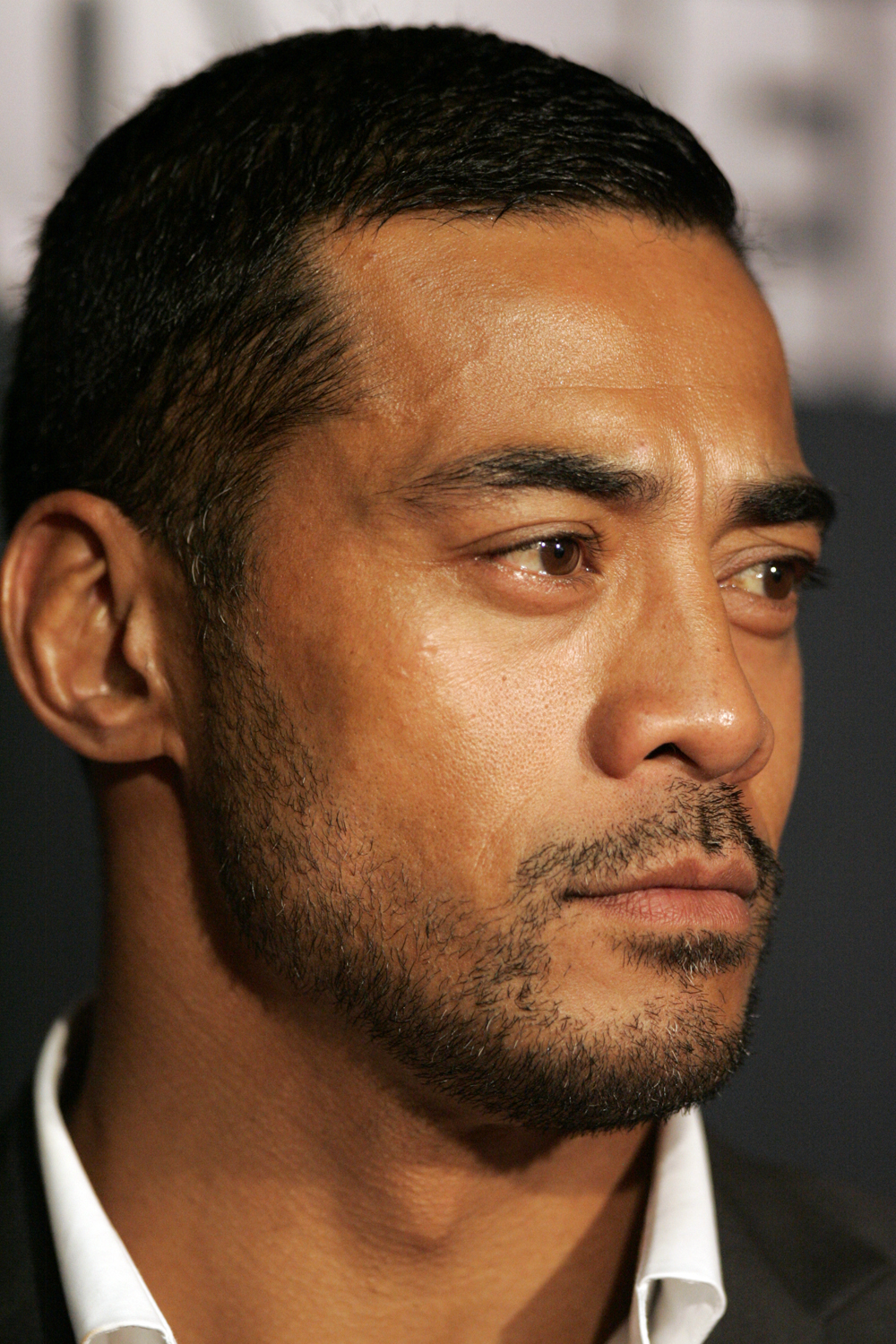
Robbie Magasiva was praised by critics for his performance.

The film has received mixed reviews, with Steve Kilgallon of stuff.co.nz praising the film's dark but clever plot, the character of Albert and gave the film four stars out of five. Tenani French of View New Zealand also praised the decision to tackle a tougher storyline while maintaining much of the comedic charm of the first film. Russell Baillie of The New Zealand Herald gave the film a negative review, pointing out plot weaknesses and criticising the "cartoonish" feel of the film. However he praised the broad comedy and "conviction" of newcomer Kirk Torrance. Kirk Torrance's character and the Australian siblings were noted by Stuff reviewer James Croot as the only flaws in a well-written and well-acted illustration of Polynesian life in New Zealand. Dominic Corry of The New Zealand Herald entered the cinema hoping to enjoy the film but found it unsatisfying. Graeme Tuckett of The Dominion Post gave the film a scathing review, calling it "plotless" and awarding it one and a half stars out of five. A review in The National Business Review, criticised the high amount of product placement in the film.

=== Box office ===
The film did well commercially, taking in $723,000 over its opening weekend. Thus making it the highest opening weekend of any New Zealand made film.

=== Awards ===
Award	Category	Nominee	Result
Film Award	Best Actress and Best Supporting Actress	Madeleine Sami and Jessica Joy Wood	Nominated

== Soundtrack ==
Sione's 2: Unfinished Business: Original Motion Picture Soundtrack

Soundtrack album by Various artists
- Released: 10 January 2012
- Recorded: 2012
- Genres: Soundtrack, Music, R&B/Soul, Hip-Hop/Rap
- Length: 7:40
- Label: Universal Music
- Producer: Various artists

Don McGlashan film scores chronology
Derby Dogs (2012)	Sione's 2: Unfinished Business: Original Motion Picture Soundtrack (2012)	The Dead Lands (2014)

Singles from Sione's 2: Unfinished Business: Original Motion Picture Soundtrack
- 1. "I Promise" Released: 6 January 2012

Sione's 2: Unfinished Business: Original Motion Picture Soundtrack is the film's soundtrack album made by Various artists and was released on 10 January 2012, by Universal Music.

=== Soundtrack list ===
- Savage feat Ria - I Promise
- Mareko - Gotta Go
- Home Brew - Saturday
- David Dallas feat Che Fu - Sideline
- PNC - Bomb!
- P-Money feat David Dallas and Aaradhna - Say Yeah
- Mz J feat Deacon Kelemete Ta'ale - O Le Atua Lava
- P-Money feat Vince Harder - Everything
- Frisko feat Aaradhna - Music (Makes the World Go Around)
- Devolo - Too Shy
- Mareko feat J Williams - Them Eyes
- Savage feat Baby Bash & Angel Dust - Wild Out (Chooo Hooo)
- Vince Harder - Think You've Got It All
- Monsta feat J Boog - This Is Love
- Fredricks Brown - All The Days
