= Bro'Town =

New Zealand adult animated sitcom (2004–2009)

bro'Town
- Genre: Animated sitcom
- Created by: Elizabeth Mitchell; Naked Samoans
- Based on: The performance of the local four-man group The Naked Samoans
- Developed by: Naked Samoans
- Written by: Elizabeth Mitchell; Naked Samoans; Mario Gaoa; David Fane; Shimpal Lelisi; Oscar Kightley
- Screenplay by: Elizabeth Mitchell; Naked Samoans; Mario Gaoa; David Fane; Shimpal Lelisi; Oscar Kightley
- Directed by: Elizabeth Mitchell; Ali Ekeroma Cowley; Maka Makatoa
- Creative directors: Ali Ekeroma Cowley; Maka Makatoa
- Presented by: Firehorse Films
- Starring: Mario Gaoa; David Fane; Shimpal Lelisi; Oscar Kightley
- Voices of: Mario Gaoa; David Fane; Shimpal Lelisi; Oscar Kightley
- Theme music composer: Kyan Laslett O'Brien
- Opening theme: Various music
- Ending theme: Various music
- Composers: Nesian Mystik, Matthew Wilson, Christopher James.
- Country of origin: New Zealand
- Original language: English
- No. of seasons: 5
- No. of episodes: 32 (list of episodes)

Production
- Executive producer: Trevor Haysom
- Producers: Elizabeth Mitchell; James Griffin
- Production location: Morningside, Auckland, New Zealand
- Cinematography: Naked Samoans
- Editors: Dave Armstrong; Anthony Farac; Steven Sinkovich; Emma Papaconstantinou
- Camera setup: Animated rendition of single-camera
- Running time: 22 minutes
- Production companies: Firehorse Films; NZ on Air; DQ Entertainment; Toon City Animation

Original release
- Network: TV3
- Release: 22 September 2004 – 24 May 2009

bro'Town is a New Zealand adult animated sitcom that aired on TV3 from 22 September 2004 to 24 May 2009. It starred David Fane, Mario Gaoa, Shimpal Lelisi and Oscar Kightley.

== Overview ==
The main characters in the series are five 14 year old Polynesian New Zealand boys who live in Morningside, Auckland, New Zealand. They attend the local college, St Sylvester's. It was New Zealand's first primetime animated television show and was very popular when it was first shown in 2004 with 33 per cent of the viewing audience during its 8-8.30pm time slot for the first season. bro'Town is heavy with popular culture references, and is based on the comedy theatre group The Naked Samoans. The series has faced criticism often for being racist, for example every episode of the first season received complaints. The writers often describe the humour as being 'not PC' (politically correct) and is satire with characters being sent-up. One of the series writers Oscar Kightley says of the humour, "The only reason we get away with that irreverence and edgy stuff is because on the flipside is heart."

bro'Town has left a lasting legacy on popular culture in New Zealand driven by its urban Pacific Island culture. It has been critically acclaimed "as hilarious and alarmingly true to life", studied at universities, and used for health messages in a cartoon booklet with information about rheumatic fever.

=== Production ===
Produced by New Zealand company Firehorse Films which was created by Elizabeth Mitchell for bro'Town and funded by New Zealand On Air. The lead designer was Ant Sang who was responsible for character, location and prop designs. bro'Town was made using three animation studios – two in New Zealand and one in India – and involved over 100 staff. The series was done in traditional ink and paint animation. The show satirises the boys' culture, with dialogue in the local vernacular. The series includes references to New Zealand literature, particularly the novels and short stories of Witi Ihimaera. The series has strong religious references, with most episodes starting with events between God, Jesus Christ and other historical figures, which leads to the theme of the episode and the subsequent events between the boys.

== Characters ==
=== The Boys ===
- Vale Pepelo (Oscar Kightley) – (Vale loosely translates to Dumb) Brother of Valea Pepelo. He has a strong social conscience. Contrary to his given name, Vale is considered the intelligent one of the group, frequently seen carrying a literary classic. (Samoan)
- Valea Pepelo (Shimpal Lelisi) (Valea loosely translates to Dumber) – Brother of Vale Pepelo. He is more interested in girls than Vale. Whenever he sees an attractive girl, he does a rendition of the 'schwing!' gesture (peyow peyow!) Valea's name is an apt description. Valea has a description of "the pasher" after noting in a Bro' Town annual his goal in life is to "pash hot chicks" and his dream is for "hot chicks" that like to be "pashed". Although loosely translated to Dumber, Valea is known to be only slightly behind in the National Standards. Jeff da Māori is more likely to fail exams, and, if under correct conditions (getting hit by a bus, for example) Valea is amazingly intelligent. (Samoan)
- Sione Tapili (Mario Gaoa) – From A Tongan Descent, his mother is known as a Sheman and is also Vale and Valea's best friend. Sione is considered the rich and smart one of the group and considers himself as a ladies' man, while he constantly looking for ways to impress the girl of his dreams, sixth former Mila Jizovich. He is also the "bro" likely to have dream sequences e.g. posing as a super hero and starring in famous movies. (Tongan)
- Jeff da Māori (David Fane) – Jeff Da Māori lives with his mother and eight dads in a car shell outside the house. He is considered the clumsy and shy one by the group, He was brought up in the country by his aunt Queenie but then moved to the city for better TV reception and "because the thieving colonialist stole our land". He is often portrayed with a horribly runny nose. He is known for his catchphrase 'Not Even Ow!' (meaning 'that ain't right'). He is also known to call many people his cousin, and claims "everyone's my cousin, except Winston Peters he's a 'dick' ow". He is known to be actual cousins with famous actress Keisha Castle-Hughes and famous actor Cliff Curtis. (Māori)
- Rodney David Damascus McCorkenstein-Taifule aka Mack (David Fane) – Mack rounds out the group as a heavyset boy with an effeminate demeanour and a knack for talking his way out of things. Although he does stand behind his word eventually. He is of Jewish and Samoan descent from his mother and father respectively. Mack is considered the tough guy of the group, claiming to have been raised in the streets. He actually lives in a high class mansion with a loving mother and father. Mack's homosexual tendencies and feminine behaviour are more and more obvious as the show develops, but his friends seem to choose to ignore it. He is also known to be a snob at school, probably excelling at most subjects, and noted to be reading Memoirs of a Geisha. (Tongan/Jewish)

=== Other characters of Morningside ===
- Pepelo Pepelo (David Fane) – Vale and Valea's dad is a New Zealand Bogan benefit abusing, occasional fork-lift driver with a love of beer, pornography and gambling (aka "The Town Drunk"). His catchphrase is "I'm going to the pub... I may be some time". Pepelo's wife died when the boys were young and they were entrusted to his care. However, his method of child rearing was ignoring them to fend for themselves. The closest he inadvertently gets to parenting is occasionally telling the boys a relevant and touching story from his own life. He is known to discriminate against other ethnic minorities in Morningside, have frequent drunk-driving crashes and blame his dysfunctions on the war in Vietnam.
- Wong (David Fane) – Initially a Chinese exchange student from Hong Kong. After a rocky start he quickly became mates with the boys by sharing his wealth and letting them ride in his car. He once helped the Boys by joining in the St. Sylvester's rugby team in Get Rucked and bet a million dollars on Honky the Wonderhorse. Wong has a brother named White, who exists only to facilitate a racist pun about being unable to tell White from Wong.
- Constable "Bobby" Bababiba (Mario Gaoa) – A cynical and unsympathetic policeman who, being the only police officer to appear on the show, has been involved with many of the boys' mishaps as he tries to restore order in Morningside. His image and name are based on actor Robbie Magasiva.
- Rakeesh Maadkraklikka (Mario Gaoa) – A disgruntled Indo-Fijian dairy store owner. He is eager to shoot and zap any potential troublemaker or thief in his store. Pepelo owes a massive debt to Rakeesh's store due to his indulgence and improper spending. He is married to the beautiful Satisha.
- Satisha Maadkraklikka – Rakeesh's spouse. She is not as brash as her husband, but Satisha is just as tough. However, she shows a sympathetic side as well: on two occasions Satisha helped The Boys with their problems and issues.
- Reverend Minister (Vela Manusaute) – Stereotypical minister who heads a Samoan flock in Morningside. He frequently preaches about the local issues in very vivid and exaggerated ways (as was featured in Sione-rella and Touched by a Teacher). He is also quick to drive his flock on mindless angry mob sprees. As a sideline for his church he also sells 'authentic' holy items at high prices (like holy water and sheep-shaped caps). There seems to be an intimate relationship between him and Agnes. Agnes' youngest child has an uncanny resemblance to the minister, including his hairdo – for that matter, so do most of the very young children of his congregation. He is very similar to the Minister character in the recurring sketch Milburn Place, part of the Skitz comedy series in which several Naked Samoans were involved.
- Mahari Stevens (Vela Manusaute) – A Social worker from CYPFS -Children and Young Person's Family Services (a reference to the NZ CYFS -Children Youth and Family Services). She appeared in the first episode when Pepelo disappeared for four days, responding to a ten-year-old complaint about his terrible parenting, and made the Pepelo brothers "Wards of the State". She also later interrogated Mack and inadvertently manipulated him into accusing Brother Ken of child molestation, and threatened to take him away from his parents when he revealed it was in fact false.

=== Tapili family ===
- Agnes Esmeralda Beatrice Tapili (David Fane) – Sione's mother and the Pepelos' neighbour. She is deeply religious and physically aggressive, especially to Sione (she refuses to show this side of her in public, though). Despite this, she seems to have intimate relations with the local minister. She serves as a caricature of the overbearing Polynesian mother who will not hesitate to humiliate her children. Willing for a husband, she is shown to have phone sex with Pepelo Pepelo, even though she is shown to hate him.
- Sina Tapili – (Teuila Blakely) – Sione's older sister and Mila's friend. Sina views her brother and the boys disdainfully (constantly calling them losers), except for one time when Mack was crying. She attends St Cardinal's College for girls, known to the boys of neighbouring St. Sylvester's as 'Cardinal Knowledge.'
- Timothy "Motorcycle Boy" Tapili – Agnes' eldest son. He is a delinquent who is a regular in the local delinquent centre (which Agnes euphemistically calls a "boarding school") and jail. His real name and nature were exposed in the episode "Go and ask Agnes", where it is revealed that his criminal record is not very impressive and he behaves more like a pretentious bully than the "hardcore" criminal he claims to be. He is shown to be a role model to Sione and Sione states he wants a bike like him.
- Samson – Agnes' youngest son. He is the presumed son of the minister, though Agnes refers to him as "A miracle by Jesus".

=== School folk and students ===
- Brother Ken (David Fane) – St. Sylvester's Fa’afafine principal. He is a personal childhood friend of many famous New Zealanders, including actress Lucy Lawless and former prime minister of New Zealand, Helen Clark. Brother Ken is a caring and reasonable principal, and once helped a then-young Mack (a nickname created by Brother Ken) to become friends with the boys. Because the concept of Fa’afafine, a person in Samoa, American Samoa and the Samoan diaspora who identifies themselves as having a third gender or non-binary role, which ranges from extravagantly feminine to conventionally masculine, does not readily translate, when the series was broadcast on Adult Swim Latin America, a decision was made not to translate Samoan words and just present them as part of the "cultural journey".
- Rex Ruka – Rex is a typical sort of jock or alpha male in St. Sylvester's. He is regularly seen mocking the boys due to their supposed inferiority with Joost by his side. Rex is Sione's rival for Mila's hand.
- Joost van der Van Van (Oscar Kightley) – A South African immigrant whose father Hansje manages the local zoo. As is expected, he acts as Rex's partner, providing appreciation for his many putdowns (often saying "Hilarious!"). However, it was revealed in "A Chicken Roll at My Table" that Joost's racism was an act and he only did it because he was discouraged by his grandfather from making friends with coloured people. His name is a nonsense parody of Dutch surnames and means 'of the of.' Although unknown, it has been suggested that his name may have been derived from Springbok player Joost van der Westhuizen.
- Mila Jizovich – A Croatian student of St. Cardinal's, best friends with Sina Tapili and Sione’s crush. She is best known for helping Lucy Lawless with the birth control presentation in "Sionerella". Her name appears to be a combination of tribute to the actress Milla Jovovich and the word "jizz", a vulgar term in reference to semen.
- Abo (Abercrombie Smith the Third) – An Aboriginal Australian who studies in St. Sylvester's. His nickname is either derived from a racial slur or his real name, Abercrombie. Abercrombie is known to celebrate every occasion with a (often very long) traditional song or dance. He is often seen riding an emu. Though Abercrombie has made political comments regarding Indigenous native title, the satirical point of this character is unclear as very few Aboriginal Australians live in New Zealand. As such, he is more surreal than satirical.
- Ms. Lynn Grey – A teacher who manages The Boys' class at St. Sylvester's. She seems to have an affection for Māori men (as is shown in "A Māori at my Table"). A parody of well-meaning liberal Anglo-Saxon, she will carefully use Māori vocabulary but immediately follow it with a slightly patronising English explanation. Her name is a reference to the Auckland suburb of Grey Lynn.

=== Figures in Heaven ===
- God (Mario Gaoa) – As the creator of the universe, God can choose to be anything he wants. Thus he is satirically portrayed as a well-built Pacific Islander in a lavalava. He appears mellow and easy-going, rather than strict and wrathful. God starts each episode in Heaven as if it were a fairy-tale, usually telling it to Jesus Christ and other famous, deceased notable figures. His lines "For my sake" and "For the love of me" is somewhat justified as they're based on him and people say lines regarding him such as "For God's sake" and "For the love of God".
- Jesus (Shimpal Lelisi) – The Lord's only son. Unlike the past serious and solemn renditions of the Christian divinity, Bro'Town portrays him as young and naive (despite his past mortal life more than 2000 years ago). He generally seems like a somewhat wimpish teenager, who often needs to be gently taught a lesson by his Father.

There are also two female angels Angelina and Angelita.

Occasionally, deceased relatives such as Pepelo's wife (Vale and Valea's mother), or Jeff da Maori's Auntie Queenie are featured, appearing in dreams to communicate with the living.

=== Guest stars ===
bro'Town frequently features special guests – notable celebrities from politics, art, culture, music, the media, business and sport. The most regular cameos are John Campbell and Carol Hirschfeld, newsreaders from TV3 at the time. Former All Blacks and Manu Samoa player Michael Jones plays the P.E. teacher at St Sylvester's. Former New Zealand Prime Minister Helen Clark has appeared in all seasons except the last and rapper Scribe has been a guest on five seasons of bro'Town. The show features numerous cameos of people playing themselves, including Russell Crowe, Rove McManus, Robyn Malcolm, Neil and Tim Finn, Lucy Lawless, Flight of the Conchords, H.R.H. Charles, Prince of Wales, Sir Howard Morrison, Keisha Castle-Hughes, Cliff Curtis and Madeline Sami.

== Episodes ==
Season	Episodes	Originally released	
Season	Episodes	First released	Last released
1	6	September 22, 2004	October 27, 2004
2	7	September 15, 2005	October 26, 2005
3	7	September 27, 2006	November 8, 2006
4	6	October 11, 2007	November 15, 2007
5	6	April 19, 2009	May 24, 2009

=== Season 1 (2004) ===
No. overall	No. in season	Title	Directed by	Written by	Original release date
1	1	"The Weakest Link"	N/A	The Naked Samoans, David Fane, & Mario Gaoa	September 22, 2004
After being run over by a bus, Valea suddenly becomes the brainiest boy in Morningside, and the boys stun the school by making it through to the televised finals of the national quiz show.
2	2	"Sionerella"	N/A	David Fane, Mario Gaoa, & Oscar Kightley	September 29, 2004
Sione finally gets the chance to impress the girl of his dreams at the school ball, but his mother Mrs Tapili and his rival Rex Ruka do all they can to ruin his chances.
3	3	"The Wong One"	N/A	David Fane, Mario Gaoa, & Oscar Kightley	October 6, 2004
Wong from Hong Kong arrives in Morningside and Dad takes him in as a homestay visitor, but a case of mistaken identity sees Vale kidnapped in Wong's place by the legendary Grasshopper...a hot Asian chick with incredible martial arts skills!
4	4	"Get Rucked"	N/A	David Fane, Mario Gaoa, & Oscar Kightley	October 13, 2004
It's the annual rugby match against the St Sylvester's Old Boys, but when the school 1st XV comes down with food poisoning the boys have to play against a crack multi-code team featuring Joe Rokocoko, Tana Umaga and Stacey Jones!
5	5	"A Maori at My Table"	N/A	David Fane, Mario Gaoa, & Oscar Kightley	October 20, 2004
The boys go on a trip to Jeff's marae, which turns out to be a tangi, and the mantle of leadership is suddenly thrust upon an unsuspecting Jeff.
6	6	"Go Home Stay Home"	Maka Makatoa	David Fane, Mario Gaoa, & Oscar Kightley	October 27, 2004
When Constable Bababiba discovers that Vale and Valea have been left home alone, he sends Vale to a bad boys home and Valea to a rich, white family in Parnell. But when Dad realises he is no longer eligible for his benefit he launches a bid to bring his boys back home!

=== Season 2 (2005) ===
No. overall	No. in season	Title	Directed by	Written by	Original release date
7	1	"Zeelander"	N/A	The Naked Samoans, Elizabeth Mitchell, & David Fane	September 15, 2005
It's Morningside Fashion Week, and one of the world's top fashion designers discovers Jeff da Maori and catapults him to international catwalk fame.
8	2	"Survival Of The Fattest"	Maka Makatoa	David Fane, Mario Gaoa, & Oscar Kightley	September 21, 2005
The class sets out on their annual day trip, but when the boys are taken out of their environment, strange things start to happen!
9	3	"Honky the Wonderhorse"	Maka Makatoa	David Fane, Mario Gaoa, & Oscar Kightley	September 28, 2005
The boys feel sorry for a racehorse who is about to get killed. They rescue him and arrive home just in time to stop Dad killing him for dinner. A Sea Biscuitesque journey follows... Dad becomes the horse whisperer and keeps whispering threats into Honky's ear.
10	4	"Touched By A Teacher"	N/A	David Fane, Mario Gaoa, & Oscar Kightley	October 5, 2005
When Mack tries to impress his mates by inventing a story about being abused, Brother Ken gets thrown into jail and a witch-hunt ensues.
11	5	"Half-Cast Away"	N/A	David Fane, Mario Gaoa, & Oscar Kightley	October 12, 2005
The boys find a half caste baby and try to bring it up, but find it very difficult catering to its mixed cultural needs and soon decide the baby's better off without them.
12	6	"A Chicken Roll At My Table"	N/A	The Naked Samoans, Elizabeth Mitchell, & David Fane	October 19, 2005
Joost's conservation-loving zoo-keeping Dad invites the boys to the van Der Van Van's African-themed Morningside Shore home for a weekend cultural exchange... but an incident with a chicken roll turns the weekend into a weird kind of whodunit.
13	7	"Morningside Story"	N/A	David Fane, Mario Gaoa, & Oscar Kightley	October 26, 2005
An incident of racial abuse inspires St Sylvester's to produce a multi-racial musical love story called MorningSide Story... Vale is director, Jeff's in charge of music, Sione, Sina, Mack and Rex are the stars. But when Mrs Tapili finds out one of her children will be kissing a Maori in the play, she goes all out to stop the show!

=== Season 3 (2006) ===
No. overall	No. in season	Title	Directed by	Written by	Original release date
14	1	"In My Mother's Den"	N/A	N/A	September 27, 2006
The boys wake up to a Canadian at their table, and it turns out to be dad's new girlfriend who has moved in and seems set on being their new Mum!
15	2	"Know Me Before You Haunt Me"	Ali Cowley	Mario Gaoa, Oscar Kightley, & Shimpal Lelisi	October 4, 2006
It's Halloween and the boys go trick or treating and end up at a haunted house on the outskirts of Morningside. There they meet the ghost of a young Maori boy who died in the 1800s, but is still stuck between the dead and the living.
16	3	"Upstairs Brownstairs"	Ali Cowley	David Fane, Mario Gaoa, & Oscar Kightley	October 11, 2006
Dad becomes a member of the prestigious Morningside Club and becomes the club's most regular visitor. But when Valea starts dating the Club President's daughter, the president tries to kick Dad out.
17	4	"Go Ask Agnes"	N/A	David Fane, Mario Gaoa, & Oscar Kightley	October 18, 2006
When the Minister convinces Mrs. Tapili to give more money to the church, she gets hooked on gambling and ends up almost losing everything.
18	5	"Mack is from Mars, Sione's a Psycho"	Ali Cowley	David Fane, Mario Gaoa, & Oscar Kightley	October 25, 2006
When Mack sees how bad the St Cardinal's netball team is, he decides they need help from an expert. He disguises himself as a Muslim and impresses the girls with his excellent skills!
19	6	"I Still Call Australia Home... Oh"	Ali Ekeroma Cowley	David Fane, Mario Gaoa, & Oscar Kightley	November 1, 2006
With special guests Russell Crowe and Rove McManus, as well as Scribe, Neil Finn and 3's own John Campbell and Carol Hirschfield, the boys are at the annual Polyfest – the secondary schools cultural competition – and are desperate to get into the glamorous Samoan group. However, when that doesn't work out (because Sione almost burnt down the stage the previous year), they decide to try something that no one has ever done – they form New Zealand's first Australian group!
20	7	"The Summer the Brazilian Came"	Ali Ekeroma Cowley	David Fane, Mario Gaoa, & Oscar Kightley	November 8, 2006
The boys head out to Te Hiha surf beach, where Mack 'breaks in' to a very flash beach-house. Vale falls for Victoria, a volleyball player from Brazil, and must overcome his fear of water. The classic Kiwi summer story, full of barbecues, beach scenes and bonfires.

=== Season 4 (2007) ===
No. overall	No. in season	Title	Directed by	Written by	Original release date
21	1	"Sons for the Return Homo"	N/A	N/A	October 11, 2007
Morningside's wimpiest criminal, Motorcycle Boy, returns home from 'boarding school' and starts training the boys to be staunch gang members. Until Sione's cajone's get the boys into trouble again.
22	2	"The Artful Dadger"	N/A	N/A	October 18, 2007
Valea becomes immersed in the art world, unleashing the tortured artist within! But, bitter rivalry quickly ensues when a jealous Dad busts out his best art skills, impressing the glitterati and stealing his son's limelight and stealing his son's limelight.
23	3	"A Miracle in Morningside"	Ali Ekeroma Cowley	David Fane, Mario Gaoa, & Oscar Kightley	October 25, 2007
When Mack gives up food and water for Lent, he becomes convinced he is a descendant of Jesus Christ and Maria Von Trapp from The Sound of Music. Mack creates the 'Church of the Awesome Show Tunes', and convinces his followers that he is the Chosen One.
24	4	"Yes Prime Minister!"	Ali Ekeroma Cowley	David Fane, Mario Gaoa, & Oscar Kightley	November 1, 2007
The boys travel to the capital city where they are surrounded by fierce opponents and dirty tricks as they become embroiled in the dog eat dog world of politics at Youth Parliament.
25	5	"An Alien at My Table"	Ali Ekeroma Cowley	David Fane, Mario Gaoa, & Oscar Kightley	November 8, 2007
The boys head to Kia Ora Bay for a star studded Matariki concert to celebrate the Maori New Year, but one by one New Zealand's finest musicians disappear and Jeff gets the blame! Can the boys save New Zealand music? Or will this be the day the music died?
26	6	"I'm Going to Limbo... I May Be Some Time"	Ali Ekeroma Cowley	David Fane, Mario Gaoa, & Oscar Kightley	November 15, 2007
Pepelo Pepelo's hard living lifestyle finally catches up with him, and while the boys maintain a bedside vigil, Dad embarks on a journey of the soul, where he must face the demons of his past.

=== Season 5 (2009) ===
No. overall	No. in season	Title	Directed by	Written by	Original release date
27	1	"The Summer of Samson"	N/A	David Fane, Mario Gaoa, & Oscar Kightley	April 19, 2009
When Sione catches Agnes and the Minister in a compromising position, he discovers that his brother Samson is the spawn of adulterers and, fueled by his new fundamentalist friend, tries to exorcise Samson's demon.
28	2	"A Vegetarian at My Table"	N/A	David Fane, Mario Gaoa, & Oscar Kightley	April 26, 2009
The boys embark on a documentary project about their favourite food -but Vale is horrified when he discovers a dead mouse inside his meat pie's pastry. The boys take a vow of vegetarianism and are passionately determined to expose the dodgy innards of the meat industry, but when the powers that be catch wind of their plan, Vale becomes the meat in the sandwich!
29	3	"To Sam with Love"	N/A	David Fane, Mario Gaoa, & Oscar Kightley	May 3, 2009
When world famous actor Sam Neill turns up to teach Drama at St Sylvester's, the boys become his biggest fans! Mack is particularly enamored of Sam's charm and charisma, but becomes confused by his overwhelming feelings, and stuns everyone by letting one too many skeletons out of the closet!
30	4	"Apocalypse Ow"	N/A	David Fane, Mario Gaoa, & Oscar Kightley	May 10, 2009
Jeff's unhinged Uncle Murray returns from Afghanistan and takes the boys to a 'fun' camp, but before long everyone except Jeff realises that things are not what they seem. Will Jeff turn on his friends once and for all?
31	5	"Lost in Cyber Space"	N/A	David Fane, Mario Gaoa, & Oscar Kightley	May 17, 2009
Rakeesh converts his Dairy into a Cyber Café and Valea soon becomes a 'War is Fun' Master. However his obsession with the game starts to take over his life. When the boys also discover that he has been having a secret relationship, they realize it is crisis time.
32	6	"So You Think You Can Dance Near the Stars?"	N/A	David Fane, Mario Gaoa, & Oscar Kightley	May 24, 2009
When Pepelo is slipped an Ecstasy tablet he gets all loved up and convinces Agnes to show the world her fancy footwork in a televised Dance competition. Will the pair become more than just dance partners, and will two families become one in this sizzling series final?

== Awards ==
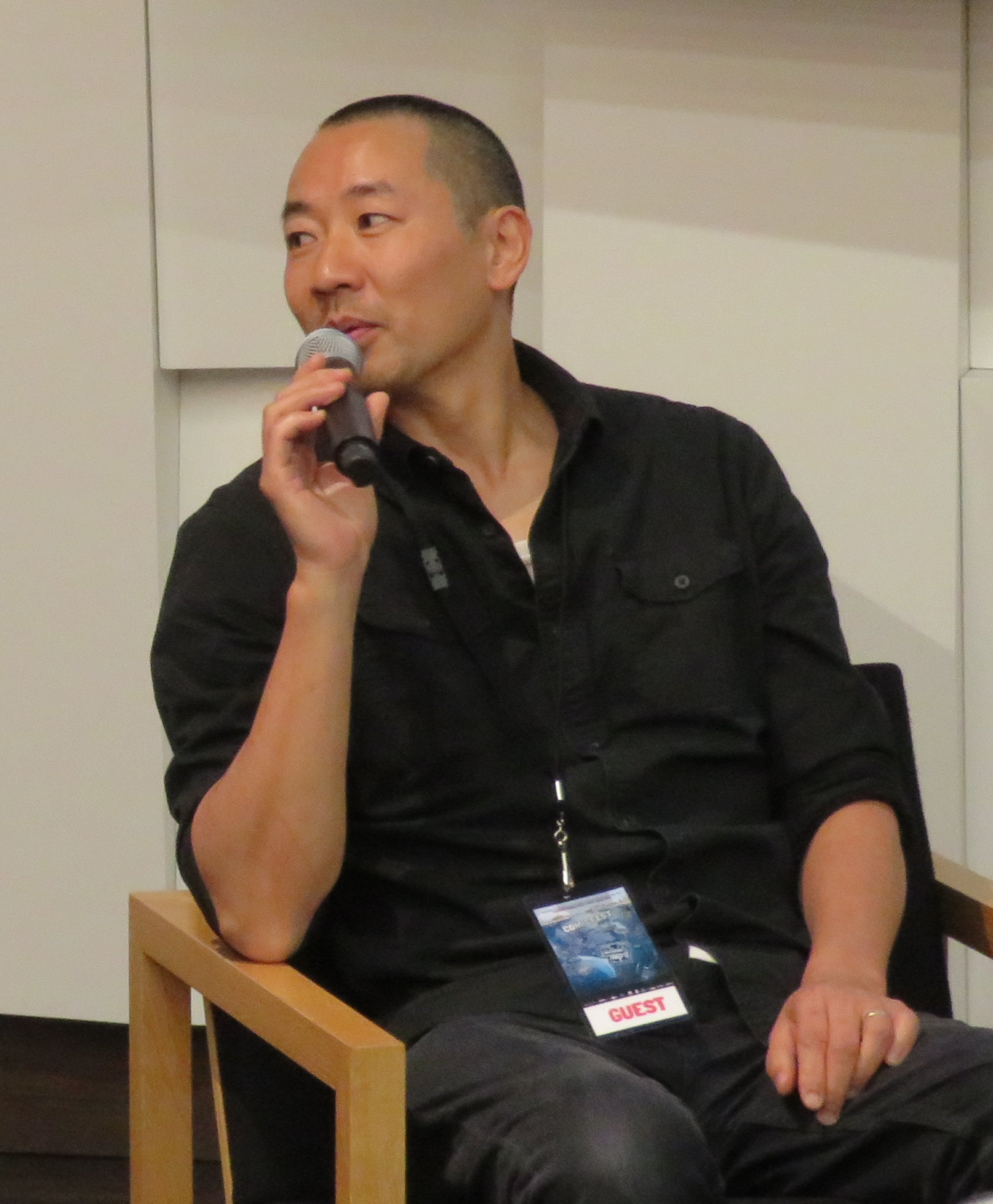
Award-winning animator of bro'Town, Ant Sang

While it was running the series bro-Town was often nominated at New Zealand film and television awards in a range of categories. It won the following awards:

- 2005 New Zealand Screen Awards – Best Comedy Programme, Best Comedy Script – Television: episode 6, 'The Weakest Link' – Mario Gaoa, David Fane, Mario Gaoa, Oscar Kightley, Shimpal Lelisi and Elizabeth Mitchell
- 2005 Qantas Television Awards – Best Comedy Programme
- 2006 Air New Zealand Screen Awards – Best Comedy Programme, Comedy Script – Television: episode 2.6, 'Touched by a Teacher' – Oscar Kightley, Mario Gaoa, David Fane, Shimpal Lelisi, Elizabeth Mitchell, Production Design: Ant Sang
- 2007 Air New Zealand Screen Awards – Best Comedy Programme: Episode 3.2, 'Know Me Before'
- 2008 Qantas Film and Television Awards – Achievement in Production Design – Television: Ant Sang

== Books ==
- Firehorse Films (2005). The bro'Town Annual. Auckland: Random House New Zealand. ISBN 978-1-86941-747-5. OCLC 972704194.
- ——————— (2006). The bro'Town Annual 2. Auckland: Random House New Zealand. ISBN 978-1-86941-841-0. OCLC 156718397.
- ——————— (2007). The bro'Town Annual 3. Auckland: Random House New Zealand. ISBN 978-1-86941-946-2. OCLC 861382922.

== DVD Releases ==
DVD name	Release date	Ep #	Additional Content
Series 1	7 December 2005	6	
Series 2	24 October 2006	7	
Series 3	12 September 2007	7	
Series 4	1 December 2010	6	
Series 5	7 December 2010	7	
