= Nathaniel Lees =

New Zealand actor

- Born: 20 July 1952 (age 74); Auckland, New Zealand
- Occupations: Actor, theatre director
- Height: 6 ft 1 in (185 cm)

Maiava Nathaniel Lees (born 20 July 1952) is a New Zealand theatre actor and director and film actor of Samoan descent, best known for film roles in The Matrix Reloaded, The Matrix Revolutions and The Lord of the Rings: The Two Towers and for starring in Young Hercules as Chiron the centaur.

== Career ==
Lees was born in Auckland, New Zealand. He was brought up in an environment where Samoan was commonly spoken, so he grew up thinking of himself as being Samoan. He got his first acting job because of "being brown", as the theatre required brown people running around on stage killing Captain Cook. Part of the audition was him walking through the door, and upon doing so, he "had the job".

He is known for his role as Captain Mifune in The Matrix trilogy and his role as "Uglúk" in The Lord of the Rings: The Two Towers. He has also had roles on the TV series Young Hercules, Hercules: The Legendary Journeys and Xena: Warrior Princess. He appeared in 30 Days of Night with Josh Hartnett. He also played Master Mao in the Power Rangers series Power Rangers Jungle Fury. Early television appearances in New Zealand included a regular role in the 1989 series Shark in the Park.

He is also well known for a long career in theatre, having received many prestigious rewards for his contribution to the arts. Lees was one of the influential actors that paved the way for Pacific theatre in New Zealand. In 2004, he was awarded the Senior Pacific Artist Award at the Creative New Zealand Arts Pasifika Awards.

== Theatre director ==
Lees was the director of the award winning play Think of a Garden written by John Kneubuhl, performed at the Watershed Theatre in 1993 in Auckland and then again in 1995 produced by Cath Cardiff and performed at Taki Rua Theatre in Wellington 1995. At the prestigious Chapman Tripp Theatre Awards 1995, the play won Production of the Year and Lees was awarded Director of the Year. In 1996, he directed A Frigate Bird Sings co-written by Oscar Kightley and Dave Fane and produced by Makerita Urale for the New Zealand International Festival of the Arts. The set was designed by Kate Peters and Michel Tuffery. The play was nominated for Production of the Year, Director of the Year, and Set Design at the 1996 Chapman Tripp Theatre Awards. In 2003, Lees directed The Songmaker's Chair by Albert Wendt. He also directed Awhi Tapu, by Māori playwright Albert Belz. Lee's contributed to the bi-lingual play O le pepelo, le gaoi ma le pala'ai, written and co-directed by Ui Natano Keni and Sarita Keo Kossamak So, as part of the 2022 Kia Mau Festival. The company featuring a cast of accomplished artists such as Tusi Tamasese, Semu Filipo, Fiona Collins, Tupua Tigafua, Taofi Mose-Nehemia and emerging artists, Albert Latailakepa, Maurea Perez-Varea, Brett Taefu, Jake Arona, Villa Junior, Lanakila Opetaia-Tiatia.

== Filmography ==
- Other Halves (1984) – Court Clerk
- Death Warmed Up (1984) – Jackson
- Shaker Run (1985) – Squad Commander
- Gloss (1987, TV series) - Phil
- Chill Factor (1989) – Charles
- Rapa-Nui (1994) – Long Ear Chief
- Hercules and the Lost Kingdom (1994) – Blue Priest
- Bonjour Timothy (1995) – Mr. Wiley
- Hercules: The Legendary Journeys (1996) – Blue Priest
- Xena: Warrior Princess (1997) – Niklio
- Hercules: The Legendary Journeys (1997) – Cheiron
- Young Hercules (1998) – Cheiron
- The Legend of William Tell (1998) – Leon
- The Other Side of Heaven (2001) – Kelepi
- The Lost World (2001, TV Movie) – Indian chief
- The Lord of the Rings: The Two Towers (2002) – Uglúk
- The Matrix Reloaded (2003) – Captain Mifune
- Liquid Bridge (2003) – Ogitani
- The Matrix Revolutions (2003) – Captain Mifune
- The Market (2005, TV series) – Ronnie
- No. 2 (2006) – Uncle John
- Sione's Wedding (2006) – Minister
- The Tattooist (2007) – Mr. Perenese
- 30 Days of Night (2007) – Carter Davies
- Power Rangers Jungle Fury (2008, TV Series) – Master Mao (6 episodes)
- Journey to Ihipa (2008)
- Under the Mountain (2009) – Detective Gray
- Sione's 2: Unfinished Business (2012) – Minister
- Mr. Pip (2012) – Mr. Jaggers
- Realiti (2014) – George
- One Thousand Ropes (2016) – Henry Pasi
- Everybody Else Is Taken (2016, Short) – Geoffrey
- Mortal Engines (2018)
- The Other Side of Heaven 2: Fire of Faith (2019) – Kelepi
- The Dead Lands (2020, TV series) – Te Kaipō
- Darkest Light (2023) – Superintendent Dean Porter
- Sweet Tooth (2024) - Munaqsriri (4 episodes)
- The Rule of Jenny Pen (2024) – Sonny Ausage
