= Mario Gaoa =

New Zealand actor, writer and director

- Born: 1971 (age 54–55); Auckland, New Zealand
- Occupations: Actor, writer/director
- Spouse: Lisa Gaoa

Mario Gaoa (born 1971) is a New Zealand actor, writer and director, best known as a member of the Naked Samoans comedy group. He is of Samoan descent. As part of the group he has appeared in the film Sione's Wedding; provided the voices of Sione Tapili and God in the animated series Bro'Town, which he also co-writes; and acted in various Naked Samoans comedic theatre performances. He has also appeared in the film Nightmare Man and briefly in the television series Hercules: The Legendary Journeys.

The youngest son of Sam and Tulua Gaoa, Gaoa grew up in the Mount Roskill suburb of Auckland, New Zealand. He attended Balmoral Intermediate School, where he met Shimpal Lelisi, later to become another Naked Samoans member. The two attended Mt Albert Grammar School before joining the Pacific Theatre group. This led them to meet David Fane and Oscar Kightley, the other founding members of Naked Samoans.

Gaoa continues to write for stage and television, delivering a dramatic piece Two Days in Dream in Auckland. The critics' reviews of his first work encouraged him to focus more on writing. Currently he is free lance directing for both Tagata Pasifika and Mai Time. He also hosts a lunchtime show named the "Beat Box" on the New Zealand Pacific radio station Niu Fm. Alongside DJ Reminise

He directed one of the segments of the anthology film We Are Still Here, which premiered as the opening film of the 2022 Sydney Film Festival.
