= Teuila Blakely =

New Zealand actress

- Born: 13 January 1975 (age 51); Tauranga, New Zealand
- Occupation: Actress
- Years active: 2002–present
- Children: 1

Teuila Blakely (born 13 January 1975) is a New Zealand born actress of Pakeha and Samoan descent best known for her roles in Shortland Street, Sione's Wedding, Sione's 2: Unfinished Business, Filthy Rich, and Power Rangers Beast Morphers.

== Early life ==
Blakely was born on 13 January 1975 in New Zealand. She was raised in Tauranga, New Zealand and is the fourth of five children. Her mother was a Mormon and her father was Catholic.

== Career ==
Blakely started her acting career with minor roles in the Polynesian film The Legend of Johnny Lingo, an appearance on the television series Outrageous Fortune as Savannah, and a voice acting role in Bro'Town as Sina Tapili. Her first major film role came when she was cast as Leilani in the 2006 comedy Sione's Wedding. She returned as Leilani in the 2012 sequel Sione's 2: Unfinished Business.

Blakely is most known for her television role as Vasa Levi on the popular prime-time soap opera Shortland Street from 2010 to 2014. In 2015, Blakely was a contestant on Dancing with the Stars but she and partner Scott Cole were eliminated on 29 June. In 2016, Blakely was cast play the role of Malia on the television series Filthy Rich and also sang "This Is For My Girls" with Laura Daniel, Daisy Lawless, Lucy Lawless, Saraid Cameron, Kimberley Crossman, Kura Forrester and Ilah Cooper.

In 2021, she made an appearance as TV3's guest panellist reacting to the interview between Oprah Winfrey, Prince Harry and Meghan Markle.

== Personal life ==
Blakely gave birth to her son Jared at the age of 17.

== Filmography ==
=== Film ===
Year	Title	Role	Notes
2003	The Legend of Johnny Lingo	Natiti's Sister	
2006	Sione's Wedding	Leilani	
2012	Sione's 2: Unfinished Business	Leilani	
2022	A Royal Treatment	Queen Catherine	Netflix

=== Television ===
Year	Title	Role	Notes
2004–2009	Bro'Town	Sina Tapili	Voice
2005	Outrageous Fortune	Savannah	
2010	Radiradirah	Handmaiden / Aroha	
2010	This Is Not My Life	Lani / Mani	
2010-2014	Shortland Street	Vasa Levi	
2012	Missing Christmas	Kiri TePania	TV movie
2015	Dancing with the Stars	Herself	
2015	Westside	Talita	
2016-2017	The Barefoot Bandits	Kiri / Kiri TePania	Voice
2017	Filthy Rich	Malia	
2018	Power Rangers Super Ninja Steel	Spyclops	Voice
2018	Funny Girls	Various	
2019–2020	Power Rangers Beast Morphers	Commander Shaw	
2022	Power Rangers Dino Fury	General Shaw	1 episode
2023	Power Rangers Cosmic Fury	General Shaw	1 episode
