= List of bro'Town episodes =

The following is a list of episodes for the New Zealand animated television comedy series, Bro'Town.

== Episode list ==
=== Season 1 (2004) ===
- The Weakest Link (22 September 2004) - The boys of Bro'Town are infamous for giving St. Sylvester's a bad name every year on an "It's Academic"-style quiz show, but after being hit by a bus and getting a concussion on the head gives Valea the knowledge of the universe, the boys ace this year's competition. Thinly disguised appearances by Auckland Grammar School as "F.A.G.S", Diocesan School and St Cuthbert's College combined as "Saint Cutherscans", Howick College as "Howick Beijing College" and The Northern Club.
- Sione-rella (29 September 2004) - Due to the news that student pregnancy rates rise after the school ball, Sione's uber-religious and short-tempered mother refuses to let Sione go. However, The boys decide to hatch a plan to let Sione go to the Ball, with unfortunate results. The main highlight involves Xena Warrior Princess Lucy Lawless having a sex-ed demonstration with a banana.
- The Wong One (6 October 2004) - Wong, a Chinese student, moves to Morningside and quickly makes friends with the Boys. His family's wealth from selling 'Western'-style chopsticks makes him an ideal target for kidnapping. The fun occurs when a mysterious woman known only as 'Grasshopper' arranged his abduction and kidnapped Vale instead, although now they plan to kill him unless Wong's parents can pay up $100.000.
- Get Rucked (13 October 2004) - The All Blacks of 2004 play a game of rugby union with St. Sylvester's — and the boys get to cook, but due to improper food handling the school's rugby team gets a bad case of diarrhoea and Food poisoning. Thus, the boys of Bro'Town must fight the A.B.s on St. Sylvester's behalf (with Mack as the team captain, who just happens to be horrible at rugby).
- A Māori at My Table (20 October 2004) - The five boys go on a school visit to Jeff's marae, where the mantle of Rangātira is unexpectedly thrust upon him when his Auntie dies of diabetes. Cousin Cliff Curtis appears and persuades the Whānau to sell the land to Japanese investors and Jeff has to make a decision. References to The Whale Rider are common.
- Go Home, Stay Home (27 October 2004) - When Pepelo takes a long time to come home from a night out, the CYFS takes Vale and Valea away to loving homes. Pepelo becomes ecstatic when his 'two useless sons' are taken away, but quickly realises that they are crucial to his domestic purposes benefit. Will he get them back (his boys and his benefit)?

=== Season 2 (2005) ===
- Zeelander (15 September 2005) - It's Morningside Fashion Week, and one of the world's top fashion designers discovers Jeff da Māori and catapults him to international catwalk fame. Jeff becomes 'the new black' and thanks to his "brown eye for the white guy", celebrities all over the world start dressing in school uniforms and bare feet with guitars on their back. However, Jeff suddenly get thrown into a world of drugs and fame, which suddenly has him losing his friends and his mind. This episode explores the vagaries of fame, and of being flavour of the month. It also looks at true vs. false friends. This episode has many allusions to popular culture, including the usage of "upside down B", also known as P.
- Survival of the Fattest (21 September 2005) - The class sets out for a day in the bush, but the boys get lost and stranded in the wilderness. Sione starts to go mad and presumes he is a Māori warrior chief, and starts to enslave the boys and turn into a cannibal. This episode is about savage instincts and human nature.
- Honky the Wonderhorse (28 September 2005) - Vale and Valea feel sorry for a racehorse who is about to get killed – so Pepelo takes him home for dinner. The boys arrive just in time and persuade him to let them train it and race it. Unfortunately, the only one who is left to ride it is Valea, who just happens to have Equinophobia-the fear of horses. Our story then takes on the formulaic path of great horse films like Seabiscuit. Pepelo becomes the horse whisperer and keeps whispering threats into Honky's ear. The episode's theme is unconditional love.
- Touched by a Teacher (5 October 2005) - When Mack tries to impress his mates by inventing a story about being abused and 'bad touched' by Brother Ken. Brother Ken gets thrown into jail and a witch-hunt ensues, led by the Minister and Mrs. Tapili. Mack becomes a celebrity and is lauded for his braveness in coming forward and subsequently finds himself in a major conundrum. This episode deals with mob mentality and the sheep-like nature of human beings.
- Half-Caste Away (12 October 2005) - The boys find a baby in the creek and try to bring it up, but struggle from sleep deprivation and the ordeal of nappy-changing until they have to search elsewhere for parents for the baby.
- A Chicken Roll at My Table (19 October 2005) - Joost's conservation-loving zoo-keeping Dad invites the boys to the Van den Van Van's African-themed Morningside Shore home for a weekend cultural exchange after the boys save Joosts life from a rampaging elephant... but an incident with a chicken roll turns the weekend into a weird kind of Whodunit. The episode's theme is bullying and karma. The chicken roll incident is a specific reference to the notorious Broomstick Incident involving boys from Napier.
- Morning Side Story (26 October 2005)- An incident of racial violence inspires Vale to write a school musical addressing the issue. When the school finds out that Prince Charles will be attending they redouble their efforts, but Mrs Tapili throws a spanner into the works when she realises that Sina will have to kiss a Māori in the play. The episode's theme is racial harmony.

=== Season 3 (2006) ===
- In My Mother's Den (27 September 2006) - The boys wake up to a Canadian at their table, and it turns out to be dad's new girlfriend who has moved in and seems set on being their new Mum.
- Know Me Before You Haunt Me (4 October 2006) - It's Halloween and the boys go trick or treating and end up at a haunted house on the outskirts of Morningside. There they meet the ghost of a young Māori boy who died in the 1800s, but is still stuck between the dead and the living. This ghost starts to haunt and possess Jeff which gets him thrown into a Mental Hospital, which means the boys have to find the secret to this boy, and release his soul from Jeffs body.
- Upstairs Brownstairs (11 October 2006) - Dad becomes a member of the prestigious Morningside Club and becomes the club's most regular visitor. But when Valea starts dating the Club President's daughter, the president tries to kick Dad out.
- Go Ask Agnes (18 October 2006) - When the Minister convinces Mrs Tapili to give more money to the church, she gets hooked on gambling and ends up almost losing everything.
- Mack Is From Mars, Sione's A Psycho (25 October 2006) - When Mack sees how bad the St Cardinal's netball team is, he decides they need help from an expert. He disguises himself as a Muslim called Mamushika and impresses the girls with his excellent netball skills. Surprisingly, Sione suddenly starts to take a taste in Mamushika. Meanwhile, The Muslims are not happy with Mamushika and try to put a stop to it.
- I Still Call Australia Home-oh (1 November 2006) - With special guests Russell Crowe and Rove McManus, as well as Scribe, Neil Finn and 3's own John Campbell and Carol Hirschfeld, the boys are at the annual Polyfest — the secondary schools cultural competition — and are desperate to get into the glamorous Samoan group. However, when that doesn't work out (because Sione almost burnt down the stage the previous year), they decide to try something that no one has ever done — they form New Zealand's first Australian group.
- The Summer The Brazilian Came (8 November 2006) - The boys head out to Te Hiha surf beach, where Mack 'breaks in' to a very flash beach-house. Vale falls for Victoria, a volleyball player from Brazil, and must overcome his fear of water. The classic Kiwi summer story, full of barbecues, beach scenes and bonfires. Final.

=== Season 4 (2007) ===
- Sons for the Return Homo (11 October 2007) - Motorcycle Boy arrives home from jail, which leads the boys up to starting a gang with motorcycle boy as the one, Mrs Tapili prepares Motorcycle Boy's 21st, and rumours of Sione's dad start to rise. There are multiple references to the 1979 cult film The Warriors.
- The Artful Dadger (18 October 2007) - Valea becomes immersed in the art world, winning praise for his talent and unleashing the tortured artist within. However, bitter rivalry quickly ensues when Dad impresses the glitterarti and steals the lime light.
- A Miracle in Morningside (25 October 2007) - In an attempt to outdo his friends, Mack gives up food and water for Lent, and becomes convinced he is a descendant of Jesus Christ and Maria Von Trapp from The Sound of Music. Via hunger-induced hallucinations, the lady Maria tells Mack to found the "Church of the Awesome Show Tunes", and Mack becomes a leader of a musical cult.
- Yes Prime Minister. (1 November 2007) - Brother Ken Insists that Vale represent St Sylvesters at Youth Parliament (Although he is under the required age) so the boys travel to capital city where they are surrounded by fierce opponents and dirty tricks. Can they survive in the dog-eat-dog world of politics?
- An Alien at my Table (8 November 2007) - Cliff Curtis organizes a Star-Studded Matariki concert at Kia Ora Bay, but one by one, New Zealand's finest musicians disappear-and Jeff gets the Blame. Will Valea and Keisha rekindle their spark? Will Jeff get to sing with Trinity Roots? Will this be the Day Music Died?
- I'm going to Limbo...I may be Some Time (15 November 2007) - Dad Pepelo's Hard Living lifestyle finally catches up with him, and while the boys Maintain a Bedside Vigil, Dad embarks on a Journey where he must face the Demons of his Past.

=== Season 5 (2009) ===
The final season started airing on Sunday 19 April 2009.

- The Summer of Samson (19 April 2009) - When Sione catches his Mum and the Minister in a compromising position, he discovers that his brother Samson is the spawn of adulterers and — fuelled by advice from his new fundamentalist friend — tries to exorcise Samson's demons.
- A Vegetarian at My Table (26 April 2009) - After Vale eats a pie with a dead mouse in it, the boys take a vow of vegetarianism. They are determined to expose the dodgy innards of the meat industry... but when the powers-that-be catch wind of their plan, Vale becomes the meat in the sandwich. Guest starring Fred Dagg, Carol Hirschfeld and John Campbell.
- To Sam With Love (3 May 2009) - When world-famous actor Sam Neill turns up to teach drama at St Sylvester's, the boys become his biggest fans. Mack is particularly enamoured of Sam's charm and charisma, but becomes confused by his overwhelming feelings and stuns everyone by letting one too many skeletons out of the closet. Guest starring Sam Neill, George Henare, Joel Tobeck, Robyn Malcom and Oliver Driver.
- Apocalypse Ow (10 May 2009) - Jeff's unhinged Uncle Murray returns from Afghanistan and takes the boys to a 'fun' camp... but before long everyone except Jeff realises that things are not what they seem when they find out Murray has been brainwashed by the Taliban. Will Jeff turn on his friends once and for all? Featuring special guests: Neil Finn, Tim Finn, Bret McKenzie and Jemaine Clement (Flight of the Conchords).
- Lost in Cyberspace (17 May 2009) - Rakeesh converts his dairy into a Cyber Café and Valea soon becomes a 'War is Fun' Master, but his obsession with the game starts to take over his life, and when the boys discover that he has been having a secret relationship, they realise it is crisis time. Can Valea be brought back to the real world... or will he be forever stuck in cyberspace?
- So You Think You Can Dance Near The Stars? (Series Finale) (24 May 2009) - When Dad is slipped an ecstasy tablet he gets all loved up and convinces Agnes to show the world her fancy footwork in a televised dance competition. Will the pair become more than just dance partners? Will two families become one? Featuring special guests: Robert Rakete, Lucy Lawless, Keisha Castle-Hughes, Sir Howard Morrison and Scribe.

== Other episodes ==
- The World According to Bro'Town (10 November 2004) - An episode that never appeared on the first season DVD. "The World…", which takes place after "The Wong One", is merely a clip show about the past episodes as presented by the boys of Bro'Town while camping out beside Vale and Valea's home.
