= Radiradirah =

2010 New Zealand comedy series

- Genre: Television comedy
- Written by: Oscar Kightley; Elizabeth Mitchell
- Country of origin: New Zealand
- Original language: English
- No. of seasons: 1
- No. of episodes: 8

Production
- Producer: Elizabeth Mitchell
- Cinematography: Jacob Bryant
- Running time: 23 min.

Original release
- Network: TV3
- Release: May 21 – July 9, 2010

Radiradirah is a New Zealand comedy sketch show that originally aired from 21 May to 9 July 2010, with a total of eight episodes.

It featured several well-known New Zealand comedians such as Taika Waititi, Rhys Darby, David Fane, Oscar Kightley and Madeleine Sami, as well as the voicing talents of internationally recognised comedian and music artist Jemaine Clement.

== Episodes ==
Air date	Episode	Notable Cast
21 May 2010	Episode #1.1	Jemaine Clement (Voice), Oscar Kightley, Madeleine Sami, Teuila Blakely, Taika Waititi
28 May 2010	Episode #1.2	Rhys Darby, Oscar Kightley, Madeleine Sami, Teuila Blakely, Taika Waititi
4 June 2010	Episode #1.3	Jemaine Clement (Voice), Oscar Kightley, Madeleine Sami, Teuila Blakely, Taika Waititi
11 June 2010	Episode #1.4	Rhys Darby, Oscar Kightley, David Fane, Madeleine Sami, Taika Waititi
18 June 2010	Episode #1.5	Oscar Kightley, David Fane, Madeleine Sami, Teuila Blakely, Taika Waititi
25 June 2010	Episode #1.6	Jemaine Clement (Voice), Rhys Darby, Oscar Kightley, Madeleine Sami, Teuila Blakely, Taika Waititi
2 July 2010	Episode #1.7	Rhys Darby, Oscar Kightley, David Fane, Madeleine Sami, Teuila Blakely, Taika Waititi
9 July 2010	Episode #1.8	Rhys Darby, Oscar Kightley, David Fane, Madeleine Sami, Teuila Blakely, Taika Waititi
