= Power Rangers Ninja Storm =

Television series

- Genre: Action-adventure; Fantasy; Superhero; Martial arts; Comedy
- Based on: Ninpuu Sentai Hurricaneger by Toei Company
- Developed by: The Walt Disney Company; Toei Company
- Showrunners: Ann Austen; Douglas Sloan
- Written by: Douglas Sloan; Ann Austen; Mark Hoffmeier; Jackie Marchand; Steve Slavkin; Art Brown; John Tellegen; M.L. Kessler
- Directed by: Koichi Sakamoto; Charlie Haskell; Andrew Merrifield; Wayne Rose; Paul Grinder
- Starring: Pua Magasiva; Sally Martin; Glenn McMillan; Jason Chan; Katrina Browne; Katrina Devine; Grant McFarland
- Theme music composer: Ian Christian Nickus; Jeremy Sweet
- Composers: Steven Vincent; Bruce Lynch; Frank Strangio
- Countries of origin: United States; Japan
- Original language: English
- No. of episodes: 38

Production
- Executive producers: Ann Austen; Douglas Sloan
- Producers: Janine Dickins; Koichi Sakamoto
- Production locations: New Zealand (Wellington Region) (Wellington), (Auckland Region) (Auckland); Japan (Greater Tokyo Area) (Tokyo, Saitama, Yokohama) and Kyoto)
- Cinematography: Simon Riera
- Camera setup: Single-camera
- Running time: 20–21 minutes
- Production companies: BVS Entertainment; Renaissance Atlantic Entertainment; Toei Company, Ltd. Village Roadshow KP Productions Limited

Original release
- Network: ABC (ABC Kids)
- Release: February 15 – November 15, 2003

Related
- Power Rangers television series

Power Rangers Ninja Storm is a television series and the eleventh entry of the Power Rangers franchise, based on the 26th Super Sentai series Ninpu Sentai Hurricaneger. The season marked a series of firsts in the franchise, being that it was the first to be filmed in New Zealand, the first to not be produced by MMPR Productions, and the first to air on ABC Kids in its entirety, debuting on February 15, 2003. It was also the last season to have theme music done by Jeremy Sweet, who had been working on most of the show's themes since Power Rangers Zeo.

== Synopsis ==
In the city of Blue Bay Harbor, Shane Clarke, Tori Hanson and Dustin Brooks are three students at the Wind Ninja Academy. Their less than stellar performance and tardiness gets them the occasional lecture from their Sensei, Kanoi Watanabe. One day, the academy is attacked by Lothor, a banished ninja master and Kanoi's identical twin brother, who has returned to capture all the ninja students. Shane, Tori and Dustin are the only three remaining students, and along with Sensei, who has been transformed into a guinea pig by Lothor, and his son Cam, retreat into the underground Ninja Ops. There, the three are given Wind Morphers, which allow them to transform into Power Rangers Ninja Storm and protect the city of Blue Bay Harbor from Lothor's forces.

When Lothor demonstrates his ability to make his monsters grow, the Rangers unleash the Ninja Zords, which could combine into the Storm Megazord and destroy monsters with its arsenal of Power Spheres, activated by special ninja power disks. Lothor again raises the stakes by sending his new allies to battle the Wind Rangers - the Thunder Rangers, Hunter and Blake Bradley, who have their own Thunder Zords. The Thunder Rangers are on a mission to destroy the Wind Rangers' Sensei, who they believed to be responsible for their parents' death, but a visit from the afterlife from Hunter and Blake's parents show them the truth - that it was Lothor who killed them. The Thunder Rangers see the error of their ways and join the Wind Rangers in the battle against Lothor, bringing the Thunder and Ninja Zords together to form the Thunderstorm Megazord.

When the Rangers lose their powers, Cam uses the Scroll of Time to travel into the past and retrieve the Samurai Amulet, a family heirloom in the possession of his late mother, where he discovers how Lothor rose to power. Cam returns to the present and uses the amulet to become the Green Samurai Ranger, armed with the Samurai Star Megazord, which later combines with the Rangers' zords to form the Hurricane Megazord. A lost scroll would later reveal to Cam the Lightning Riff Blaster, which could summon the Mighty Mammoth Zord, which combines with the Thunderstorm Megazord or the Hurricane Megazord to form the Thunderstorm Ultrazord or the Hurricane Ultrazord.

In a last-ditch effort to take over the world, Lothor attempts to open the Abyss of Evil and release its evil, causing all the monsters that were defeated over the season to be resurrected. In a final battle, the rangers, along with the rescued ninja students manage to defeats Lothor's revived army, but he steals the Samurai Amulet and uses it to take away all of the Rangers' powers. However the Wind Rangers combine their inner ninja powers to overpower Lothor and throw him into the abyss. After the battle, the powerless Rangers become ninja masters at the Wind Ninja Academy.

== Cast and characters ==
Ninja Storm Rangers

- Pua Magasiva as Shane Clarke, the Red Wind Ranger.
- Sally Martin as Tori Hanson, the Blue Wind Ranger.
- Glenn McMillan as Waldo "Dustin" Brooks, the Yellow Wind Ranger.
- Adam Tuominen as Hunter Bradley, the Crimson Thunder Ranger.
- Jorgito Vargas Jr. as Blake Bradley, the Navy Thunder Ranger.
- Jason Chan as Cameron "Cam" Watanabe, the Green Samurai Ranger.

Supporting characters

- Grant McFarland as Sensei Kanoi Watanabe
- Megan Nicol as Kelly

Villains

- Grant McFarland as Lothor
- Katrina Devine as Marah
- Katrina Browne as Kapri
- Peter Rowley as the voice of Zurgane
- Bruce Hopkins as the voice of Choobo
- Michael Hurst as the voice of Vexacus
- Craig Parker as the voice of Motodrone
- Jeremy Birchall as the voice of Shimazu

Guest stars

- Daniel Sing as Young Sensei Kanoi Watanabe and Young Kiya Watanabe
- Robbie Magasiva as Porter Clarke, Shane's brother
- Roseanne Liang as Miko Watanabe

== Episodes ==
No.	Title	Directed by	Written by	Original release date
1	"Prelude to a Storm"	Koichi Sakamoto	Douglas Sloan	February 15, 2003
Three young extreme sports lovers and friends, skateboarder Shane, surfer Tori, and motocrosser Dustin, spend their afternoons at the Wind Ninja Academy, where the protectors of the Earth are trained in secret. Though they're considered the three least dedicated students, their potential and good nature come to an advantage when they run late for class one afternoon. That afternoon, a banished evil ninja named Lothor returns to earth and conquers every Ninja Academy with his hoard of Evil Alien Ninjas. Lothor traps Sensei in the form of a guinea pig. Sensei, along with his grumpy tech-wizard son, Cam, presents the trio with the Wind Morphers. Shane, Dustin, and Tori become the Wind Ninja Rangers and defeat the monster Blue Face.
2	"There's No "I" in Team"	Koichi Sakamoto	Ann Austen	February 15, 2003
Virtual training missions between the Rangers highlights a major fault in their teamwork, focused directly on leader Shane. Despite Sensei's reminding that he must learn to trust his teammates, the Red Ranger strikes out on his own against the Mad Magnet monster. Will he learn his lesson the hard way? Meanwhile, Lothor's evil nieces Kapri and Marah are also suffering from a lack of teamwork and are forced to work out their problems by being stuck together, literally, by the monster's magnetic ray!
3	"Beauty and the Beach"	Koichi Sakamoto	Mark Hoffmeier	February 22, 2003
Tori is upset at being considered one of the guys and wishes to appear more feminine. She turns to Sensei for advice but is disappointed. Lothor's nieces use this to trick her into going to a "fashion shoot." She is trapped while an impostor called Copybot goes to find Shane and Dustin, and the headquarters.
4	"Looming Thunder"	Charlie Haskell	Jackie Marchand	March 1, 2003
The Rangers encounter a new enemy named Terra Mole who causes seismic disturbances in the city as he burrows underground. Blake and Hunter, two warriors from the Thunder Ninja Academy, show up.
5	"Thunder Strangers"	Charlie Haskell	Ann Austen	March 8, 2003
6	"Thunder Strangers"	Charlie Haskell	Ann Austen	March 15, 2003
7	"Thunder Strangers"	Andrew Merrifield	Douglas Sloan	March 22, 2003
Cam needs the data disc for the Tsunami Cycles, which Dustin had last, all unaware that it's not only landed in the hands of the evil Thunder Rangers but has been used to give them their Cycles. This leads to the first confrontation between the Wind and Thunder Rangers, and as if the heroes didn't have it bad enough, they also face and defeat Zurgane. The Thunder Rangers then strike back, defeating the Wind Rangers with their Tsunami Cycles and Zords. When Blake is injured protecting Tori, she takes him to Ninja Ops for healing, only to lead the Thunder Rangers into infiltrating their base, during which they reveal their identities as Blake and Hunter. They kidnap Sensei, blaming him for their parents' death, not realizing just how wrong they are. After Sensei seals himself inside a protective sphere, the Thunder Rangers head for a cave that contains what they need to break it. Hot on their trail, the Wind Rangers catch up with and briefly aid them. When they finally reach the cave, all is revealed when the ghosts of Hunter and Blake's parents appear. Lothor was the one responsible for the deaths of Hunter and Blake's parents. The Thunder Rangers finally come to their senses, team up with the Wind Rangers, and battle Lothor.
8	"Nowhere to Grow"	Andrew Merrifield	Steve Slavkin	March 29, 2003
The Rangers have reason to believe that Lothor is up to something when they find weird, smelly seeds planted in the ground. Sensei sends them to Dr. Belrab, a botanist, to find out more information, much to Cam's chagrin. Frustrated with having to stay at Ninja Ops, he takes it upon himself to speak to Dr. Belrab, much to the Rangers' surprise. Shane decides to follow Cam to ensure that he doesn't get in trouble, while Tori and Dustin talk to the botanist. Shane is stunned to discover that Cam can defend himself very well. Sensei expresses his disapproval and explains his concern to his son, adding that he will never let Cam be a Ranger because of a promise he made to his Mother, Miko. As Tori and Dustin work to free themselves and Dr. Belrab, they discover a lot more than expected. Things take a turn for the worse when their Ninja powers are no match for the evil vines threatening to take over the city! It's up to Cam to save the day when all seems lost.
9	"Snip It, Snip It Good"	Andrew Merrifield	Mark Hoffmeier	September 20, 2003
Tori is sent on a mission to find a turtle that holds a scroll to unlock a power disk. With Tori gone, Dustin and Shane infiltrate an environmental conference. A monster named Snipster shows up and cuts off Shane and Dustin's bonds while Tori encounters Marah and Kapri. After the fight, the big guns come out, and a new power disk is in action, the turtle mace.
10	"Return of Thunder"	Wayne Rose	Douglas Sloan	April 12, 2003
11	"Return of Thunder"	Wayne Rose	Douglas Sloan	April 19, 2003
12	"Return of Thunder"	Wayne Rose	Ann Austen	April 26, 2003
13	"Return of Thunder"	Charlie Haskell	Ann Austen & Douglas Sloan	May 3, 2003
A manager from Factory Blue comes looking for Blake and Hunter, but the brothers have yet to return. Tori, who misses Blake, takes Dustin's bike for a ride to feel close to him but ends up running into Blake in the woods. Choobo has told Blake and Hunter that he wants to leave Lothor’s army and will help them invade Lothor's ship. While Tori believes them, Shane and Dustin are hesitant. Hunter and Blake make their way to Lothor's ship, and things go awry. When the Rangers battle another of Lothor's creations, they disappear without a trace. Temperatures across the globe start to drop at an alarming rate, while the confused Rangers find themselves on an island. Lothor looks on gleefully as the Thunder Rangers battle the Wind Rangers until Blake and Hunter begin to come to their senses. A formidable creature and the Rangers find that they have to get off the island before it sinks. Things take a turn for the worse when Hunter falls under a powerful spell that sends him on a murderous rampage for Blake, who is barely saved in time by the Wind Rangers. Blake becomes more eager to save his brother than the Wind Rangers are, but they help anyway, especially when they realize that the island is sinking. They find Hunter, who struggles to find himself in his rage, forcing Blake to take matters into his own hands. Cam discovers where the Rangers are and contacts them; the Rangers find that there's only one way off the island, but it's hazardous. The Wind and Thunder Rangers have to work together, but they become on the verge of running out of time. Choobo blames the Thunder Rangers for his punishment and will stop at nothing to seek revenge, capturing them when they go out for a ride to decide if they will accept Tori, Shane, and Dustin's offer. They are freed thanks to their friends, but things get worse when Choobo reveals just how powerful he is by casting a spell to control the Wind Rangers so that they will destroy the Thunder Rangers against their will. Meanwhile, Cam scrambles to resolve a mechanical difficulty in order to combine both Megazords into the Thunderstorm Megazord, giving the Rangers the edge they need to defeat Choobo.
14	"Boxing Bopp-A-Roo"	Charlie Haskell	Mark Hoffmeier	May 10, 2003
The Rangers have agreed to work together to defeat Lothor. But there are still some conflicts. Shane and Hunter are finding it hard to work with each other. And with competition coming up, they're both trying to outdo the other, so Sensei teaches them to work together.
15	"Pork Chopped"	Charlie Haskell	Steve Slavkin	May 17, 2003
Tori wants to hang out with Blake and Hunter but already has plans with Shane and Dustin. Rather than break plans with either, she decides to do both with no one being wiser. It gets more challenging than expected between rushing back and forth and trying to explain her sudden disappearances. It turns out to be a good thing, especially when a monster named General Trayf appears and traps Blake and Hunter.
16	"The Samurai's Journey"	Paul Grinder	Jackie Marchand	May 24, 2003
17	"The Samurai's Journey"	Paul Grinder	Mark Hoffmeier	May 31, 2003
18	"The Samurai's Journey"	Paul Grinder	Mark Hoffmeier	June 7, 2003
Cam resents not being a Ranger and wishes to prove himself, hating how his father is too overprotective. It's up to Cam to save the day, though, when the Rangers are stripped of their powers by Metropolis. This forces Cam to go on a dangerous quest to the past--during which time is frozen in the present--to find the only thing that can save the world, the Samurai Amulet. In the beginning of his quest, Cam finds himself 30 years in the past. There are many more surprises in store for the young warrior when he meets his mom and dad as teenagers and discovers that his father has a brother named Kiya, who is determined to take a mesmerizing amulet from Miko, Cam's mother. Cam interferes with his attempt and is later accused when it appears that Cam has stolen the amulet. His father, Kanoi, uncovers the truth, which leads to a face-off between Cam and Kiya. It is revealed that Kiya was the banished ninja who is now reborn as Lothor. Later, time runs out, and Cam reluctantly leaves to save the other Rangers, armed with a special gift from his mother, the Samurai Amulet. With the amulet, Cam becomes the Green Ranger & helps the other Rangers defeat Metropolis with the Samurai Star Megazord. The Rangers are then ambushed by Lothor. They barely escape and retrieve their powers when each of them is forced to fight a monster alone. Sensei is still overprotective of Cam, but eventually encourages his son to know what he feels the right decision is. Cam morphs and sets off into battle, but is stung and almost turned into a bug. Sensei reveals to him how to undo the spell, which seems impossible. In the end, it takes all the Rangers, including Cam, to save the city.
19	"Scent of a Ranger"	Andrew Merrifield	Jackie Marchand	June 14, 2003
Cam's personality has turned around completely to the point that he's more like Dustin than, say, himself, and doesn't seem remotely interested in being a Ranger anymore, doing nothing to help when a new monster named Fragra is turning people into perfumes, capturing Tori and Dustin in the process. It turns out, however, that Cam's sudden switch was, in fact, a body double made by the real Cam, who helps the Rangers defeat Fragra by combining his zord with the Storm Megazord.
20	"I Love Lothor"	Andrew Merrifield	Steve Slavkin	June 21, 2003
Marah and Kapri convince Lothor to make a television show that will make him more likable. A new monster named Mr. Ratwell assures Lothor that he can create a show to make him well-liked and offers to use love potions as a backup plan. Lothor, disgusted with the idea of using love potions, refuses, and tosses them aside. Marah and Kapri decide to use them on the Rangers to prove their usefulness to their uncle as well as for fun. They accidentally make Blake and Cam fall in love with Tori, and they begin to physically fight for her affection. An intense love spell cast through the television puts all the viewers of Lothor's new show into a frenzy. It is implied at the end of the episode that Blake's feelings are genuine, but he is interrupted before he can fully explain.
21	"Good Will Hunter"	Andrew Merrifield	Steve Slavkin	June 28, 2003
Hunter is disappointed when he becomes a mentor to a boy, Charlie, who resents him after losing his dad. He feels a kinship with him when he discovers that they have something in common but is frustrated that he can't get through to him. Meanwhile, everyone's in trouble when Marah and Kapri lose Lothor's P.A.M., which falls into Charlie's hands, causing confusion for the Rangers when strange things occur. When Marah and Kapri find the P.A.M., Charlie initially doesn't recognize it for what it is., but proves himself to be a lot smarter than Marah and Kapri.
22	"All About Beevil"	Wayne Rose	Jackie Marchand	July 5, 2003
Dustin feels like everyone thinks he's stupid when he loses his bike. Meanwhile, Marah feels left out when her new friend Beevil joins the crowd and leaves only to run into Dustin, who gives her a suggestion to make her consider her options. In return, she gives him something that is supposed to help the Rangers defeat her uncle. Can Dustin trust Marah, or is it all a trick?
23	"Sensei Switcheroo"	Wayne Rose	Mark Hoffmeier	July 12, 2003
Cam is overwhelmed by the desire to have a human father that he decides to try to bring his father back to his human self using the Samurai Amulet. Unfortunately, the experiment goes awry when Shane, later Dustin, accidentally swap bodies with Sensei, forcing him to battle as a Ranger while the former two must stay and watch. Meanwhile, Marah and Kapri try to destroy the Power Rangers independently and are completely confused by the Ranger's newfound skills.
24	"Tongue and Cheek"	Wayne Rose	Art Brown	August 2, 2003
Dustin uses his Ranger powers to protect Storm Chargers from thieves. When Kelli tells a newspaper about it, Dustin inadvertently becomes famous, much to Shane's jealousy. When Hunter, Tori, and Blake get captured by a stamp monster named Slob Goblin, Dustin must learn not to use his powers for fame in order to save his friends.
25	"Brothers in Arms"	Charlie Haskell	Jackie Marchand	August 9, 2003
Motodrone is born via a real mechanical genius named Perry who comes into the scene when Hunter's bike gets trashed during a race. Motodrone takes Hunter. Cam matches the DNA of Motodrone and finds out that he's Perry. Blake and Cam save Hunter, who uses his new Ninja Glider Cycle to destroy Motodrone and save Perry.
26	"Shane's Karma"	Charlie Haskell	Mark Hoffmeier & John Tellegen	August 9, 2003
27	"Shane's Karma"	Charlie Haskell	Mark Hoffmeier & John Tellegen	August 9, 2003
It's Tori's birthday and the Rangers get a day off when Sensei decides to take a little trip. Shane, plagued by nightmares, comes to Tori for advice and heeds it to her chagrin. There's only one person who can help Shane, and that person is someone from the past named Skyla. Shane later becomes confused and overwhelmed when he learns the truth about his nightmares and their link to the past. Meanwhile, Lothor discovers an old acquaintance named Vexacus that may be trouble and is curious about why this person has shown up. Only when Skyla leaves, Shane understands everything that he's been shown and has to rely on her gift to defeat Vexacus. With the power from Skyla's soul, Shane gets his Battalizer power and manages to defeat Vexacus who reluctantly allies with Lothor.
28	"Shimazu Returns"	Andrew Merrifield	Douglas Sloan	August 16, 2003
29	"Shimazu Returns"	Andrew Merrifield	Douglas Sloan	August 23, 2003
Motodrone accidentally brings to life a statue, releasing an ancient evil known as Shimazu. The Rangers are forced to contend with ferocious wolf-like monsters called Wolfblades unleashed by this new threat. Due to Shimazu not having a voice, Lothor casts a spell to give him a voice. Cam then uses the Rangers' power discs to enter a mysterious realm where he discovers a weapon that could turn the tide in the battle against the Wolfblades; the Lighting Riff Blaster. When the Wolfblades attack again, the Rangers are forced to contend with them in their Zords unmorphed due to not having their Power Discs.
30	"The Wild Wipeout"	Andrew Merrifield	Jackie Marchand	September 20, 2003
Tori is transported to another dimension after a surfing wipeout, where the Rangers are evil and Lothor is the Mayor of Blue Bay Harbor. She must join forces with Mayor Lothor to defeat the Rangers and restore peace to the city. She eventually returns to her own dimension and helps to defeat Goldwinger (who was partially responsible for Tori's trip to the alternate dimension). When recounting her story to Blake, he refuses to believe any version of himself would abandon Tori and tells her he would still like her in any dimension.
31	"Double-Edged Blake"	Wayne Rose	M.L. Kessler	September 27, 2003
Tori begins to worry when Blake starts frequently disappearing with no explanation. No one seems to know where he is or what he's doing when he's gone. She eventually follows him and learns he's been training with a Thunder Academy graduate, Leanne, to master the Thunder Blade. A new monster, Inflatron, descends on earth and Blake uses his new abilities to defeat him. Meanwhile, the rest of the rangers battle Zurgane, Motodrone, and Shimazu. At the end of the episode, Blake teases Tori for being jealous.
32	"Eye of the Storm"	Charlie Haskell	Ann Austen	September 27, 2003
Shane's older, more successful brother, Porter, comes to visit. Unaware Shane is a Power Ranger, Porter is worried that Shane has no future plans for his life and is wasting his time skateboarding. Motodrone summons a monster named Eyezak, who forces people to face their worst fears. The Wind Rangers are forced to face their fears while the Thunder Rangers are captured. Meanwhile, Cam develops the Ninja Firebird to help combine all three Megazords into the Hurricane Megazord.
33	"General Deception"	Wayne Rose	Ann Austen	October 4, 2003
34	"General Deception"	Wayne Rose	Ann Austen & Douglas Sloan	October 4, 2003
Tori gives the guys a ride when they go camping. On the way, they are ambushed but choose not to cancel their trip. Meanwhile, Zurgane is ridiculed, and even Lothor threatens his rank. Hence, he hatches a plan to eliminate the Rangers, not knowing that Vexacus has plans of his own. Nearly everyone is stunned at how things begin to unfold for Zurgane. Zurgane's Zord was later obliterated by the Rangers, but he gets the data from their attacks and uses it when creating a new Zord, the HyperZurgane Zord, which destroys the Hurricane Megazord. Even if Zurgane survives, one of his fellow Generals has his plans for his fate.
35	"A Gem of a Day"	Charlie Haskell	Ann Austen	October 18, 2003
Hunter's secret of keeping a few of the Gem of Souls fragments comes out when Vexacus ambushes him for them. Though his teammates are upset over hiding this, the artifact aids Cam in his plans to sneak aboard Lothor's ship to free the trapped ninjas! Speaking of which, Lothor has Motodrone spy on Vexacus, leading to a showdown between the two Generals with only one coming out on top. All of this, plus the Condortron monster!
36	"Down and Dirty"	Charlie Haskell	Douglas Sloan	October 18, 2003
The Bradley Brothers clash when Blake beats Hunter in a motocross race. Kapri and Marah ask Shimazu to help them take over the ship. Dustin decides to switch from motocross racing to motocross freestyle.
37	"Storm Before the Calm"	Paul Grinder	Douglas Sloan	November 15, 2003
38	"Storm Before the Calm"	Paul Grinder	Ann Austen	November 15, 2003
The Rangers are selected to showcase their respective talents in the US Action Games. Meanwhile, Lothor prepares the final stages of a scheme set in motion by destiny itself, as he seeks to unleash the evils within The Abyss of Evil, hidden beneath the Action Games' site. When Marah and Kapri set up Vexacus' fate by having him grow giant, he challenges the Rangers, forcing Blake and Hunter to sacrifice the Thunder Megazord. Lothor discovers and destroys Ninja Ops, kidnaps Cam and blasts Sensei. When the Rangers return to Ops, they find Sensei has returned to human form, but are disheartened that they couldn't have stopped Lothor from destroying their base. However, Sensei tells them that they were always meant to be Power Rangers. With renewed confidence, the Rangers unite to take on Lothor, sacrificing what remains of their zords and powers to seal Lothor away in the Abyss of Evil.

== Home media ==
- In the United States, the series was released by Buena Vista Home Entertainment on five volumes, each containing four episodes, except for Prelude to a Storm, which has three:
- Prelude to a Storm (June 3, 2003, 1–3)
- Looming Thunder (September 2, 2003, 4–7)
- Lightning Strikers (September 2, 2003, 10–13)
- Samurai's Journey (December 9, 2003, 15–18)
- Cyber Clash (December 9, 2003, 19–22)

These volume sets were also released in regions where BVHE held distribution rights. In countries where licensing was held by Jetix Europe, releases depended on the region or distributor.

BVHE released the complete series in the United Kingdom on July 28, 2008, on an eight-disc boxset. In the United States, Shout! Factory released the complete series on a five-disc set on June 21, 2016.

== Comics ==
In the aftermath of the "Shattered Grid" storyline of Mighty Morphin' Power Rangers, called "Beyond the Grid" Cam joined a team of Rangers, called the Solar Rangers, with the Ranger Slayer, Mike Corbett, Andros, Tanya, and an undefined Dino Charge Ranger.
