= Tanya Muagututi'a =

New Zealand playwright

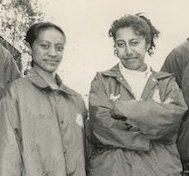
Tanya Muagututi'a (right) with long time collaborator Erolia Ifopo in 1994

Tanya Muagututi'a MNZM is a New Zealand playwright and arts festival director.

== Biography ==
Muagututi'a's father, Muagututi'a Pulusila Meafou Sagapolutele, was Samoan and moved to New Zealand in the early 1950s, aged 11, to attend school.

She co-founded Pacific Underground, a performing arts organisation for Pacific artists, in Christchurch in 1993.

In 2020, Muagututi'a won Best Play by Pasifika Playwright at the Adam New Zealand Play Awards for her script Scholars, which is based on her father's experiences as a Samoan scholarship student in New Zealand.

=== Recognition ===
In the 2021 Queen's Birthday Honours, Muagututi'a was made a Member of the New Zealand Order of Merit, for services to Pacific performing arts.

=== Personal life ===
Muagututi'a is married to Posenai Mavaega, who co-founded Pacific Underground with her.
