= Ria (singer) =

- Origin: New Zealand
- Genres: Pop, soul, R&B
- Years active: 2007-present
- Labels: M4U

Ria is a New Zealand R&B/pop singer. She is best known for her singles "Over You" and "All My Ladies". She attended Auckland Girls Grammar School.

RIA started performing at a young age before progressing in her teens to leading an all-female band called Vivah, to becoming winners of the national Smokefree Pacifica Beats in 2007. RIA is a graduate from the Music & Audio Institute of NZ (MAINZ) and singing tutor at the Otara Music Centre (OMAC).

== Discography ==
=== Singles ===
Year	Title	NZ Chart
2011	Over you	27
