= Sione's Wedding =

- Promotional poster
- Directed by: Chris Graham
- Written by: James Griffin; Oscar Kightley
- Produced by: John Barnett; Chloe Smith
- Starring: Oscar Kightley; Shimpal Lelisi; Robbie Magasiva; Pua Magasiva
- Edited by: Paul Maxwell
- Production company: South Pacific Pictures
- Release date: 30 March 2006
- Running time: 92 minutes
- Country: New Zealand
- Language: English

Sione's Wedding (also marketed outside New Zealand as Samoan Wedding) is a 2006 New Zealand comedic film directed by Chris Graham and written by James Griffin and Oscar Kightley, and produced by South Pacific Pictures.

== Plot ==
Set in Auckland, New Zealand, the film centres around four Samoan boys: ladies' man Michael, party boy Sefa, good boy Albert, and weird Stanley, who although they are in their mid 20s to early 30s have a reputation for behaving immaturely at special occasions such as family weddings. After four particular incidents (Michael having sex with one of the bridesmaids in the wedding limousine; Albert dropping the bride while she was hoisted up on his shoulder; Sefa getting drunk and passing out while going through the wedding cake and the table; and Stanley setting a reception hall on fire), the local minister of their Samoan church rules that the four are to be banned from the wedding of Michael's brother, Sione.

This is hard news for the boys, especially since Michael was supposed to be the best man, however Albert comes up with a solution – bring a date to the wedding. He proposes to the minister that being with a girl at the wedding would force the men to be on their best behaviour. The minister allows them to go but requires that the boys must have a serious relationship with their dates or Eugene (the groom at the wedding where the reception hall burned) will forcibly block them. While the boys think it is an easy plan, they soon realise that finding a girlfriend is not as easy as it looks, especially since the wedding is just one month away.

== Cast ==
- Oscar Kightley as Albert
- Shimpal Lelisi as Sefa
- Robbie Magasiva as Michael
- Iaheto Ah Hi as Stanley
- David Fane as Paul
- Pua Magasiva as Sione
- Nathaniel Lees as Minister
- David Van Horn as Derek
- Teuila Blakely as Leilani
- John Tui as Tavita
- Madeleine Sami as Tania
- Maryjane McKibbin-Schwenke as Princess
- Victoria Schmidt as Aaliyah

== Sequel ==
In March 2011, it was confirmed that filming was soon to begin on a sequel, titled: Sione's 2: Unfinished Business that was to be released in January 2012. The film was written by James Griffin and Oscar Kightley and may deal with the subject of death.

== Copyright violation case ==
The film is also well known for a high-profile court case over breach of copyright law. An employee of a post-production company was found guilty and sentenced to 300 hours community service. Film producer John Barnett estimates the movie lost $500,000 in lost box office takings and DVD sales.
