= David Fane =

New Zealand actor (born 1966)

David Fane ONZM
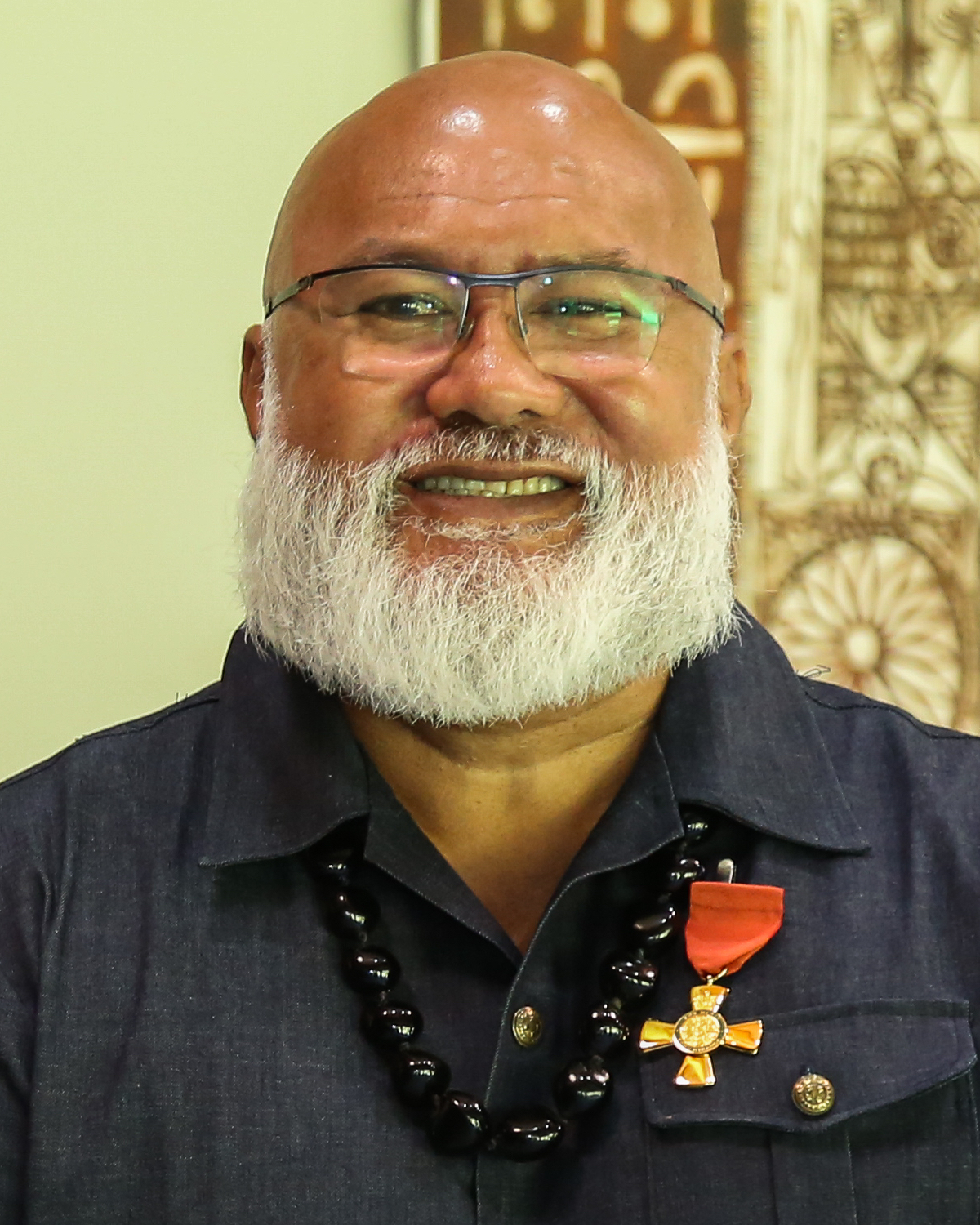
- Fane in 2023
- Born: David Rodney Fane; 28 December 1966 (age 59); Auckland, New Zealand
- Occupation: Actor
- Years active: 1993–present
- Spouse: Bronwyn Bradley
- Children: 3

David Rodney Fane ONZM (born 28 December 1966) is a New Zealand actor.

== Early life and education ==
Fane was educated at St. Pauls College in Grey Lynn.

== Career ==
Fane got into acting quite late and trained at the New Zealand Drama School Toi Whakaari, graduating with a Diploma in Acting in 1992, which he upgraded to a Bachelor of Performing Arts (Acting) in 2003.

He first appeared on television in a sketch comedy show called SKITZ alongside future Naked Samoans, Oscar Kightley and Robbie Magasiva. He then did the sitcom spinoff The Semisis, in which he played the father and the minister. In 2004 he performed in a play written by Oscar Kightley and Dave Andrews called Niu Sila. The play won the Chapman Tripp Theatre Award for Outstanding New Zealand Play of the Year. Fane was a founding member of Naked Samoans. He played a leading role in Sione's Wedding. Other roles include parts in The Tattooist, bro'Town, Outrageous Fortune and the lead role in Diplomatic Immunity.

Fane is part host on the TV2 series Island Wars and morning host for the New Zealand radio station Flava 95.8 for 10 years.

In 2016, Fane was awarded the Emerging Pacific Artist award with Oscar Kightley at the Creative New Zealand Arts Pasifka Awards. In the 2023 New Year Honours, Fane was appointed an Officer of the New Zealand Order of Merit, for services to the performing arts.

== Filmography ==
Key
†	Denotes films that have not yet been released

=== Film ===
List of films
Title	Year	Role	Director	Notes
Tongan Ninja	2002	Herman the Henchman	Jason Stutter	Feature film
The Legend of Johnny Lingo	2003	Kata	Steven Ramirez	Feature film
Sione's Wedding	2006	Bolo / Paul	Chris Graham	Feature film Double role
Eagle vs Shark	2007	Eric Elisi	Taika Waititi	Feature film
The Tattooist	2007	Mr. Va'a	Peter Burger	Feature film
Love Birds	2011	Kanga	Paul Murphy	Feature film
Sione's 2: Unfinished Business	2012	Bolo / Paul	Simon Bennett	Feature film Double role
Gary of the Pacific	2017	Dad	thedownlowconcept	Feature film
Next Goal Wins	2023	Ace	Taika Waititi	Feature film
Moana 2	2024	Kele (voice)	David Derrick Jr. Jason Hand; Dana Ledoux Miller	Animated film; also contributed to film's soundtrack
Zootopia 2	2025	Truffler (voice)	Jared Bush; Byron Howard	Animated film

=== Television ===
List of programs television
Title	Year	Role	Notes
Skitz	1993—1995	Various characters	Television series
Telly Laughs	1996	Various characters	Television series
The Semisis	1998	Dad	Television series
Target	1999	Theo	Television series
Revelations - The Initial Journey	2002—2003	Mr. Davies	26 episodes
The Strip	2002—2003	Jack Sione	4 episodes
Bro'Town	2004—2009	Jeff da Maori / Additional voices / Brother Ken / Pepelo Pepelo / Rodney McCorkenstein-Taifule 'Mack' / Agnes Tapili / Rodney McCorkenstein-Taifule (Mack) / Abercrombie Cornelius Smith the third / Wong Wong / Mack / Motorcycle / Boy / Rodney McCorkenstein-Taifule / Roger	27 episodes
The Market	2005	Tu'u Lima	10 episodes
Outrageous Fortune	2005—2010	Falani	40 episodes
Diplomatic Immunity	2005—2009	Jonah Fa'auigaese	10 episodes
Island Wars	2009	Co-host	
Radiradirah	2010	Judas / Roimata	1 episodes
800 Words	2015—2018	Smiler	16 episodes
Westside	2015—2018	Falani's Father / Falani Sr.	2 episodes
The Brokenwood Mysteries	2016	Olson Siola	Episode: "The Killing Machine"
Wellington Paranormal	2018	Raymond St John	Episode: "Ghost"
Our Flag Means Death	2022—2023	Fang / Kevin	10 episodes
Taskmaster New Zealand	2026	Contestant	10 episodes

=== Video games ===
List of video games
Year	Title	Character	Description	Ref(s)
2023	Hi-Fi Rush	Roquefort	Rhythm-based action game developed by Tango Gameworks and published by Bethesda Softworks.	

=== Accolades ===
Year	Award	Category	Nominee(s)	Result	Ref.
2022	Peabody Awards	Entertainment	Our Flag Means Death	Nominated	
