= Oscar Kightley =

Samoan-New Zealand actor and writer

Oscar Kightley MNZM
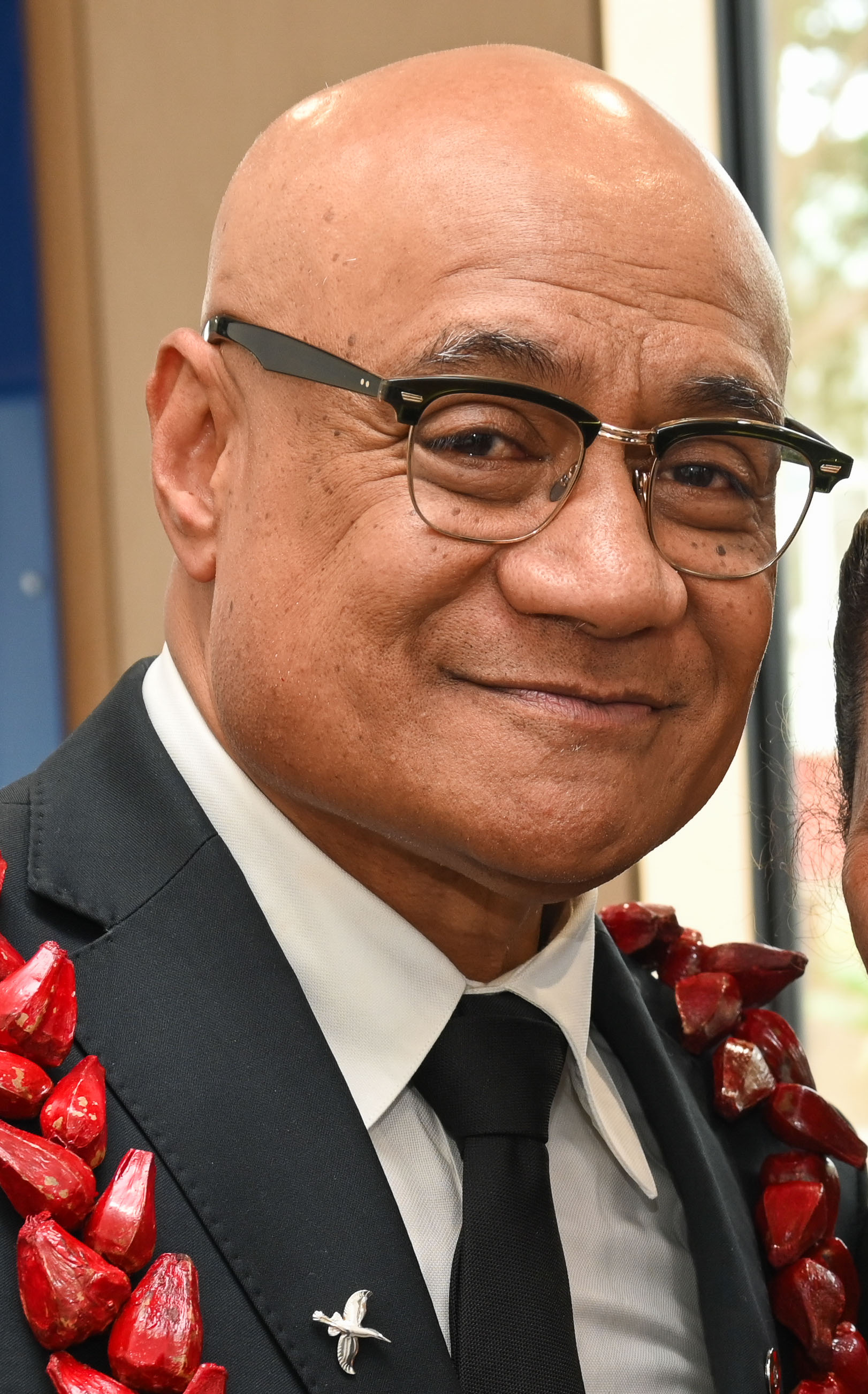
- Kightley in 2025
- Born: Oscar Vai To'elau Kightley; 1969 (age 56–57); Apia, Samoa
- Education: Rutherford College
- Occupations: Actor, presenter, writer, director, comedian
- Political party: Labour

Oscar Vai To'elau Kightley MNZM (born 1969) is a Samoan-New Zealand actor, television presenter, writer, journalist, director, and comedian. He acted in and co-wrote the successful 2006 film Sione's Wedding.

== Early life and education ==
Oscar Vai To'elau Kightley was born in 1969 in Apia, Samoa, the youngest of eight children, and was raised in his father's village of Faleatiu. He went to New Zealand after the death of his father, when he was 4 years old and was adopted by his aunt and uncle, who lived in West Auckland.

He attended Rutherford College, where writing was his favourite subject.

== Career ==
After leaving school, Kightley was a cadet at the Auckland Star, and worked as a journalist for four years. "I thought that was going to be me until I retired." He moved to Christchurch in 1991 to be a presenter for the children's television show Life in the Fridge Exists (L.I.F.E), where he met Tanya and Mishelle Muagututi'a, Erolia Ifopo, and Simon Small.

Small had written his first full-length play, Horizons, about the Samoan experience in New Zealand, and invited Kightley to perform in it in his first acting role, along with Muagututi'a and Ifopo. Horizons opened the Performing Arts Theatre on 19 October 1991 in a production directed by Christina Stachurski. The play was re-workshopped and recast (but still with Kightley) and in August–September it played at Galaxy Theatre in Auckland, Taki Rua Depot, and the Castle Theatre at the University of Otago before returning to Christchurch.

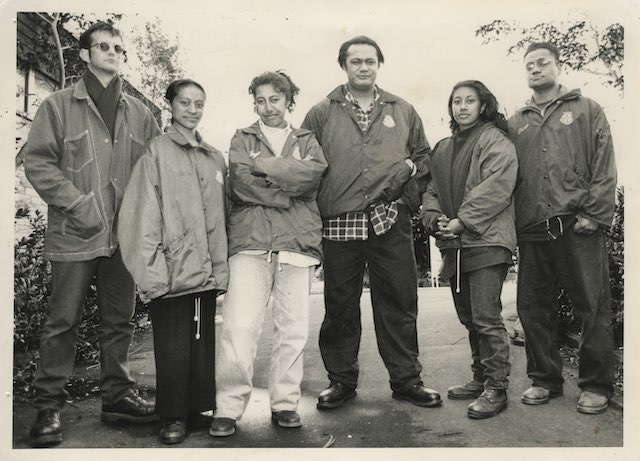
Pacific Underground members in 1994 during the season of Fresh Off The Boat at the Herald Theatre in Auckland. From left: Michael Hodgson, Erolia Ifopo, Tanya Muagututi'a, David Fane, Mishelle Muagututi'a, and Kightley

The success of Horizons inspired Kightley to form Pacific Underground theatre company in Christchurch alongside Small, Muagututi'a, Ifopo, and Michael Hodgson, a mixture of people from palagi and Pacific Island identities. In just two months Kightley and Small (who wrote as Francis Serra) had written the play Fresh off the Boat. The play was workshopped by Playmarket, and directed by Nathaniel Lees with David Fane as the lead. The play opened at the Rolleston Ave Theatre in Christchurch in November 1993, toured to the New Zealand Fringe Festival in Wellington in 1994, and also played for three weeks at Downstage in 1995. It later went to Auckland, Apia, and Brisbane. It won a Media Peace Award and was published in 2005.

As well as Pacific Underground, Kightley co-founded the Island Players theatre company. He won the Bruce Mason Playwriting Award in 1998 and has worked as a performer and writer for a number of television shows including Skitz, Telly Laughs, The Panel, Sportzah, and TV3's rugby coverage. His plays include Dawn Raids, Island Girls, A Frigate Bird Sings (co-written with Dave Fane and Nathaniel Lees), and Niu Sila (co-written with Dave Armstrong). Dawn Raids was reissued in 2018 by Playmarket. Kightley also co-wrote and took a lead role in the highly successful Sione’s Wedding movies.

He was a breakfast announcer on Niu FM until January 2007. He has also been on RNZ National/Te Reo Irirangi o Aotearoa National as a guest, as well as guest-hosting Kim Hill's Saturday Morning show during Summer 2007–2008. In 2006 he received a Laureate Award from the Arts Foundation of New Zealand. He is a member of the comedy group the Naked Samoans, who together wrote the animated television series bro'Town.

In 2013, Kightley played the title character in the police drama Harry, which he also co-wrote. He directed Madeleine Sami's TV3 comedy Super City, and co-directed a US pilot of it with Taika Waititi.

In 2019, Kightley led a panel for Auckland Council on why people should vote in local-body elections. At the 2022 local-body elections, Kightley was elected to the Henderson-Massey local board, representing the Labour Party. Kightley was re-elected in 2025.

Kightley made his directorial debut in 2021 with the documentary Dawn Raid, which told the story of Dawn Raid Entertainment, a hip-hop record label founded in South Auckland by Tanielu Leaosavai'i and Andy Murnane.

He appeared in the panel show Guy Montgomery's Guy Mont-Spelling Bee in 2026.

== Honours and awards ==
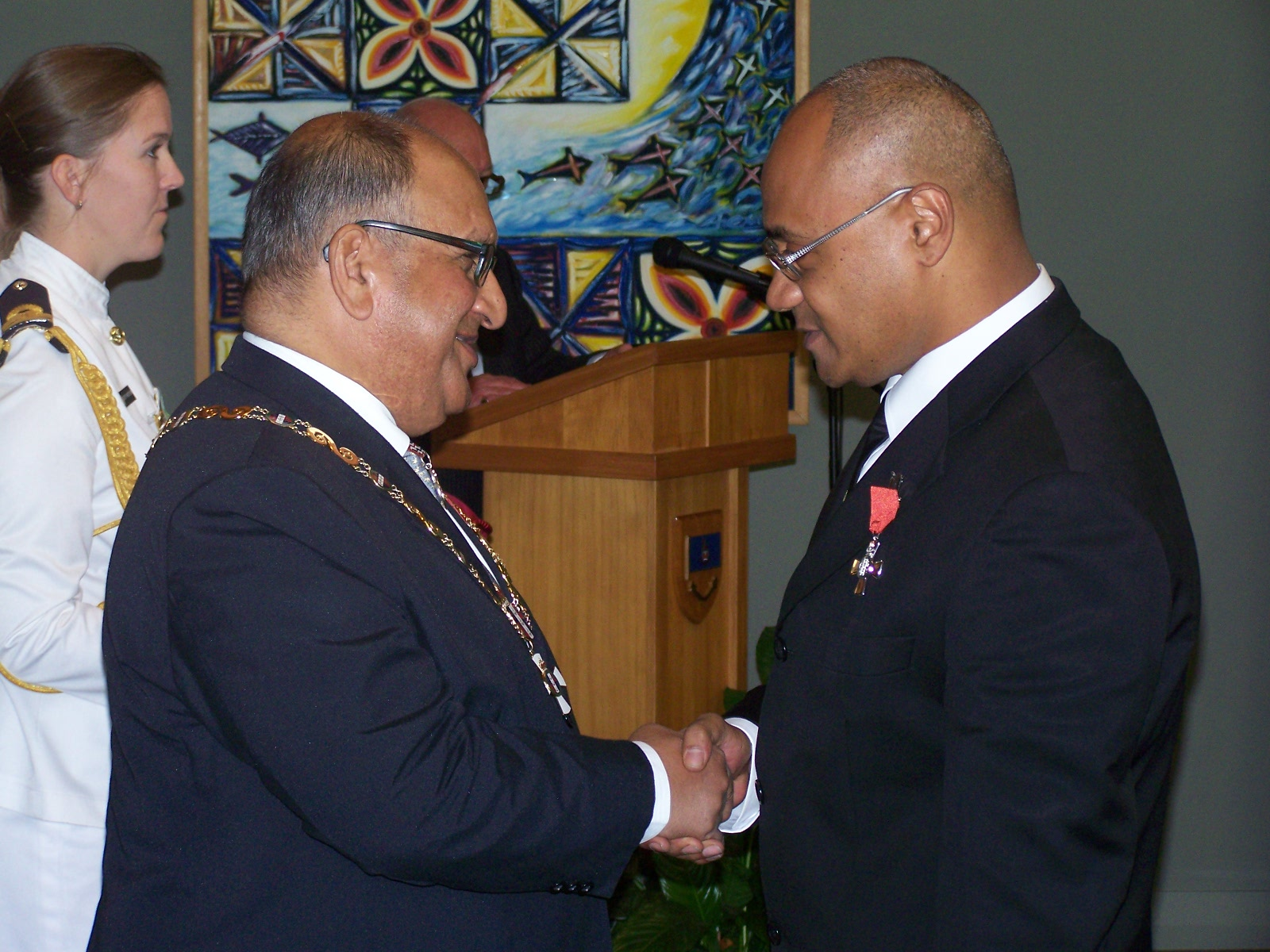
Kightley with Governor-General Anand Satyanand, shortly after his investiture to the New Zealand Order of Merit.

In the 2009 New Year Honours, Kightley was appointed a Member of the New Zealand Order of Merit, for services to television and the theatre. In 2016, he was awarded the Senior Pacific Artist Award with Dave Fane at the Creative New Zealand Arts Pasifka Awards.

In 2019, Kightley received the Fulbright-Creative New Zealand Pacific Writer's Residency, "a unique opportunity for a New Zealand writer of Pacific heritage to work on a creative writing project exploring Pacific identify, culture, or history." The significance of this award is the place it has in the development of contemporary Maori and Pacifica culture, and of Kightley's stature within the history of that development. The Residency, located at the University of Hawaiʻi at Mānoa, was inaugurated by film director, writer, and educator Sima Urale in 2004; other film and theatre artists who have received the award include Victor Rodger (2006), Toa Fraser (2009), and Makerita Urale (2010). The University of Hawaiʻi at Mānoa is also where Merata Mita "developed [the] Academy for Creative Media’s indigenous filmmaking program.

In October 2019, Kightley was presented with a Scroll of Honour from the Variety Artists Club of New Zealand for his contribution to New Zealand entertainment.

In November 2020, Kightley was named one of the best dressed men in show business on David Hartnell's best-dressed list.

== Filmography ==
Film
Year	Title	Role	Notes	Source
2006	Sione's Wedding	Albert		
2012	Sione's 2: Unfinished Business	Albert		
2013	Harry	Harry Anglesea		
2016	Hunt for the Wilderpeople	Andy		
2016	Moana	Fisherman (voice)		
2021	Dawn Raid	Director		
2022	Duck Rockers	Director/Writer/Isaac		
2023	Next Goal Wins	Tavita		
