= Robbie Magasiva =

Samoan-New Zealand actor (born 1972)

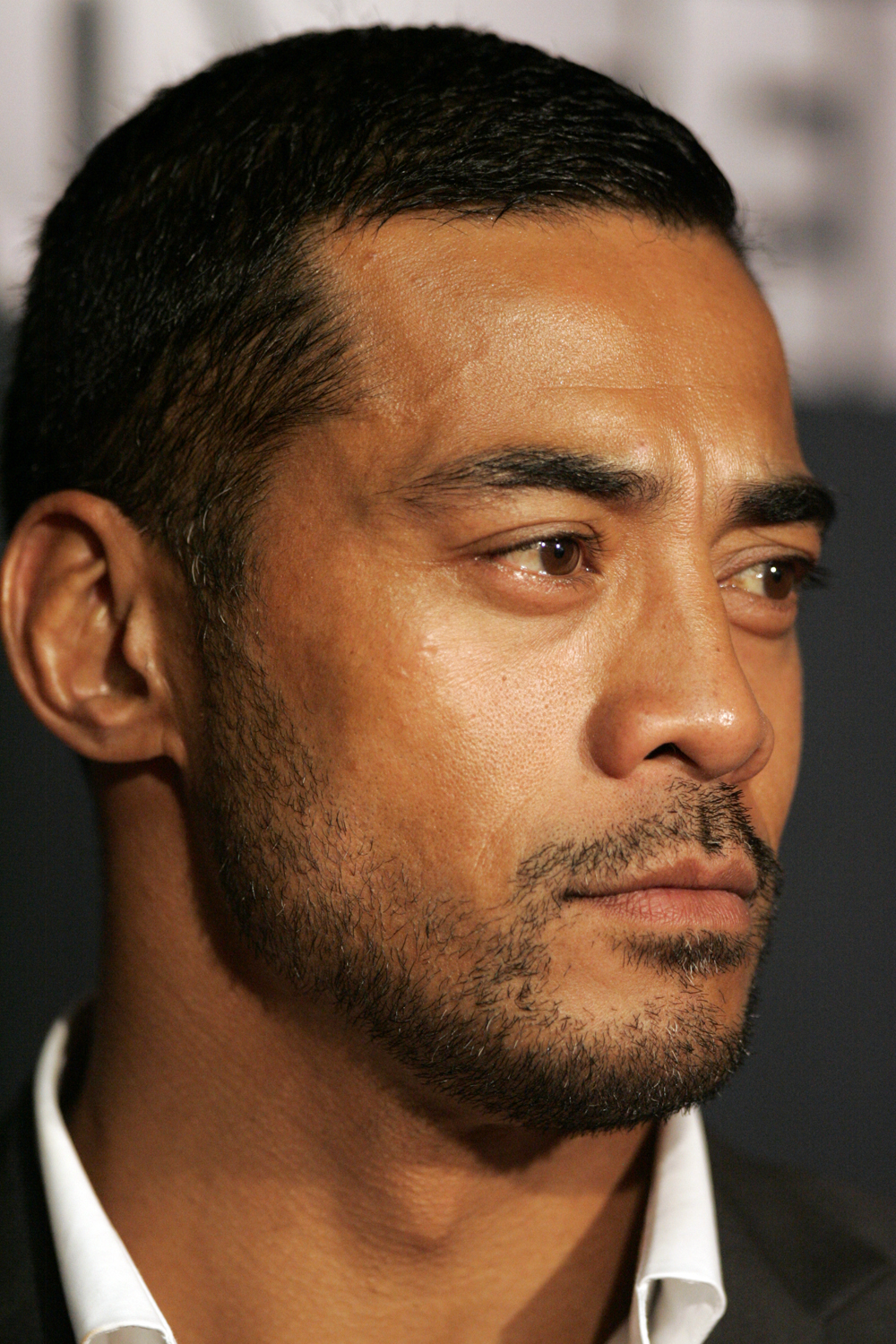
- Magasiva in 2013
- Born: Robbie Joseph Magasiva; 21 May 1972 (age 54); Wellington, New Zealand
- Occupation: Actor
- Years active: 1990–present
- Spouse: Anna Magasiva (m. 2006; div. 2011)
- Partner(s): Alice Gordon; Natalie Medlock (2011–2022); Kelly Mackey (2024–present)
- Children: 2
- Relatives: Pua Magasiva (brother, deceased) and 4 siblings

Robbie Joseph Magasiva (born 21 May 1972) is a Samoan-New Zealand actor who has starred in several films and as a member of the Naked Samoans comedy troupe. He has also appeared on television and in theatre, and was the co-presenter of New Zealand's Tagata Pasifika with famed athlete, Beatrice Faumuina. Magasiva is also known for his role on Shortland Street as Dr. Maxwell Avia, which he played from June 2009 to July 2012, and for his role as Will Jackson on the prison drama series, Wentworth (an adaptation of the women's prison drama Prisoner). Magasiva is the only male actor to appear in all eight seasons; he appeared in all 100 episodes of the show.

== Biography ==
Magasiva, born in Wellington, New Zealand, was raised in a small community west of Apia, Samoa called Tanumapua. His family moved back to New Zealand permanently when he was 10 years old.

After leaving school, he tried his hand at theatre sports and acted in commercials while working as a receptionist at an advertising agency.

=== Acting career ===
Magasiva had his start on television during the 1990s, beginning with comedy. In 1999, he portrayed Mason Keeler in Jackson's Wharf. In 2001 he starred in his first major film, Stickmen, and joined the Naked Samoans. In 2002, he played Mauhúr in Peter Jackson's The Lord of the Rings: The Two Towers. He returned to television in the show The Strip, continued his work with the Naked Samoans, and made a minor appearance in Power Rangers: Ninja Storm, also starring his brother Pua as the brother of Pua's character of Shane Clarke. In 2006, Magasiva co-starred in Sione's Wedding, a comedy film that achieved commercial success in New Zealand. In 2007 he co-starred in the horror film The Tattooist.

He joined the cast of Shortland Street as Dr. Maxwell Avia in 2009. The character was originally called Maxwell Novak but changed to Avia to relate to his Samoan descent. He left the series in 2012; he later reprised his role for a one-off appearance in September 2015.

In October 2012, Magasiva was cast in the Australian drama series Wentworth, a re-imaging of the classic show Prisoner. He plays Officer Will Jackson. The character's background was also changed when he was cast (originally meant to be an Australian officer). In 2016, he guest starred in TVNZ's Dirty Laundry.

In 2021, Magasiva starred on the Paramount+ Australia original series, Spreadsheet.

In 2022, Magasiva appeared alongside several members of the Wentworth cast at WentworthCon Melbourne.

In 2023, Magasiva gave an extensive interview about his acting career with podcast series MandateNZ, where he revealed he almost quit acting to become a firefighter after he finished filming Wentworth.

Also in 2023, Magasiva was named in the upcoming cast of NZ drama Madam.

In 2024, Magasiva was cast as Sonny Jennings in the Fox lifeguard series Rescue: HI-Surf. Though he has been on American television before, this is his first series regular role in an American production. Magasiva later revealed that he had gone for a massage and put his phone on silent and when he walked out to check his phone he had 19 missed calls, one which was from his manager telling him he had landed the role of Jennings.

In 2025, Magasiva reprised his role in the Naked Samoans as the comedy troupe would perform their last shows. On 2 July 2025, Magasiva was named in the extended cast for New Zealand series Ms X.

On 26 February 2026, Magasiva was named in the cast for the second series of Netflix series Untamed.

== Personal life ==
Magasiva is the first son of Salafa and Taufaiula Ropati Magasiva. He has four brothers, Stevan, Miki, twins Pua and Tanu, and adopted sister Trina Magasiva. He inspired his younger brother (Pua) to become an actor, landing him an audition for an alcohol awareness commercial.

Pua died aged 38 on 11 May 2019. As a result, Magasiva flew to Wellington to be with his family. Later he opened up about the devastating loss of his brother and raised mental health awareness.

Magasiva has two children, born in 1996 and 2000. Both reside in Auckland, and he looks after the kids week-on, week-off with their mother, Alice Gordon.

In 2011, Magasiva began dating his Shortland Street co-star, Natalie Medlock. They first met in 2009 while performing in a play called Christ Almighty!. Medlock recalls it was her costume that earned Magasiva's heart. In 2015, the pair went on stage again with Christ Almighty! with the Wentworth cast to raise money for the homeless. The couple attributed love and therapy for their long-term relationship.

Previously, he was married to Anna Magasiva, whom he met while he was a receptionist.

In 2024, Magasiva revealed that he had moved to the U.S. and is in a relationship with producer Kelly Mackey.

== Filmography ==
=== Film ===
| Year | Title | Role | Notes |
|---|---|---|---|
| 2001 | Stickmen | Jack | |
| 2002 | The Lord of the Rings: The Two Towers | Mauhúr | |
| 2006 | Sione's Wedding | Michael | |
| 2006 | In Her Line of Fire | Petelo | |
| 2007 | The Ferryman | Craig (Man in Club) | |
| 2007 | The Tattooist | Alipati | |
| 2007 | Perfect Creature | Frank | |
| 2012 | Sione's 2: Unfinished Business | Michael | |
| 2015 | Now Add Honey | Chef Sebastian Tasi | |
| 2020 | Lowdown Dirty Criminals | Semo | |
| 2023 | Bad Behaviour | Lawrence | |
| 2024 | The Moon Is Upside Down | Tim | |

=== Television ===
| Year | Title | Role | Notes | Ref |
|---|---|---|---|---|
| 1990–1991 | Shark in the Park | Uninformed branch | 14 episodes | |
| 1993–1995 | Skitz | Various characters | | |
| 1996–1998 | Telly Laughs | Various characters | | |
| 1998 | The Semisis | Lagi | | |
| 1998 | Tiger Country | | Television film | |
| 1999–2000 | Jackson's Wharf | Mason Keeler | 29 episodes | |
| 2002–2003 | The Strip | Adam Lima | 32 episodes | |
| 2003 | Power Rangers: Ninja Storm | Porter Clarke | Episode: "Eye of the Storm" | |
| 2005 | Mataku | Frank | Episode: "The Wild Ones - Te Uru Takariri" | |
| 2006 | Doves of War | Xavier Collins | 6 episodes | |
| 2008 | Burying Brian | Tony | 2 episodes | |
| 2009 | Diplomatic Immunity | Prince To'omai | 2 episodes | |
| 2010–2013 | Shortland Street | Maxwell Avia | Main role | |
| 2012 | Auckland Daze | Robbie | 3 episodes | |
| 2013 | Offspring | Ugly Pete | Episode: "Numbing the Pain" | |
| 2013–2021 | Wentworth | Will Jackson | 8 seasons, 100 episodes | |
| 2016 | Black Comedy | Guest cast | Episode #2.6 | |
| 2016 | Dirty Laundry | Jackson | 7 episodes | |
| 2021 | Head High | Mitch Belsham | 8 episodes | |
| 2021 | Spreadsheet | Jake | 7 episodes | |
| 2021–2024 | Under the Vines | Robert The Builder | 4 episodes | |
| 2022 | My Life Is Murder | Hamish | Episode: "Silent Lights" | |
| 2022 | Duckrockers | Ropati | 4 episodes | |
| 2024 | Dark City: The Cleaner | D.I Carl Schroder | 6 episodes | |
| 2024 | Madam | Lima | 9 episodes | |
| 2024–2025 | Rescue: HI-Surf | Harlan 'Sonny' Jennings | TV series: 19 episodes | |
| 2026 | Ms. X | Tevita | TV series | |
| 2027 | Untamed | Lt. Ochi | TV series | |

=== Other appearances ===
| Year | Title | Role | Notes | Ref |
|---|---|---|---|---|
| 2019 | Wentworth: Behind the Bars | Self | TV special | |
| 2020 | Wentworth: Behind the Bars 2 | Self | TV special | |
| 2021 | Wentworth: Unlocked | Self | TV special | |
| 2023 | MandateNZ | Self | Podcast series, 1 episode | |

== Theatre ==
| Year | Title | Role | Notes | Ref |
|---|---|---|---|---|
| 2025 | Last Temptation of the Naked Samoans | | Q Theatre | |
| 2020 | Every Brilliant Thing | | | |
| 2019 | Club Paradiso Revival | Q | | |
| 2017 | The Naked Samoans | | Auckland Festival | |
| 2015 | Club Paradiso | Q | Basement Theatre | |
| 2007 | My Name is Gary Cooper | Gary Cooper | | |

== See also ==
- List of New Zealand television personalities
