= Samoan New Zealanders =

Total population
- 213,069 (2023)

Languages
- New Zealand English, Samoan

Religion
- Christianity, No Religion

Samoan New Zealanders are Samoan immigrants in New Zealand, their descendants, and New Zealanders of Samoan ethnic descent. They constitute one of New Zealand's most sizeable ethnic minorities. In the 2023 census, 213,069 New Zealanders identified themselves as being of Samoan ethnicity with 55,512 stating that they were born in Samoa, and 861 stating that they were born in American Samoa.

== History ==
The country of Samoa (distinct from American Samoa) has a unique historical relationship with New Zealand, having been administered by New Zealand from 1914 to 1962.

Notable levels of Samoan migration to New Zealand began in the 1950s. In the 1970s, Samoan illegal immigrants were the targets of notorious "dawn raids" by the police, which led to accusations of ethnic bias in tackling illicit immigration. That same decade, some Samoan New Zealanders joined the newborn Polynesian Panthers, an organisation dedicated to supporting Pasifika New Zealanders, for example by providing information on their legal rights. The number of Samoan-born residents in New Zealand doubled to over 24,000 during the 1970s. In Auckland, Samoan communities developed in inner city suburbs, such as Ponsonby, Freemans Bay and Grey Lynn. By the mid-1970s, gentrification caused Samoan communities to relocate to more distant suburbs, such as Māngere and Massey. Grey Lynn continued to have a large Samoan population until the mid-1980s.

In 1982, a number of Samoan-born residents were granted citizenship with the Citizenship (Western Samoa) Act. Samoan immigration in New Zealand has subsequently been regulated by quotas. Since 2002, 1,100 Samoans are granted entry each year.

In the 1980s, figures from the Samoan community became nationally recognised New Zealand celebrities, such as rugby union player Michael Jones, who grew up in Te Atatū South. In 1993, Samoan-born Taito Phillip Field became the first Pasifika member of parliament (MP), when he was won the Otara electorate seat for Labour.

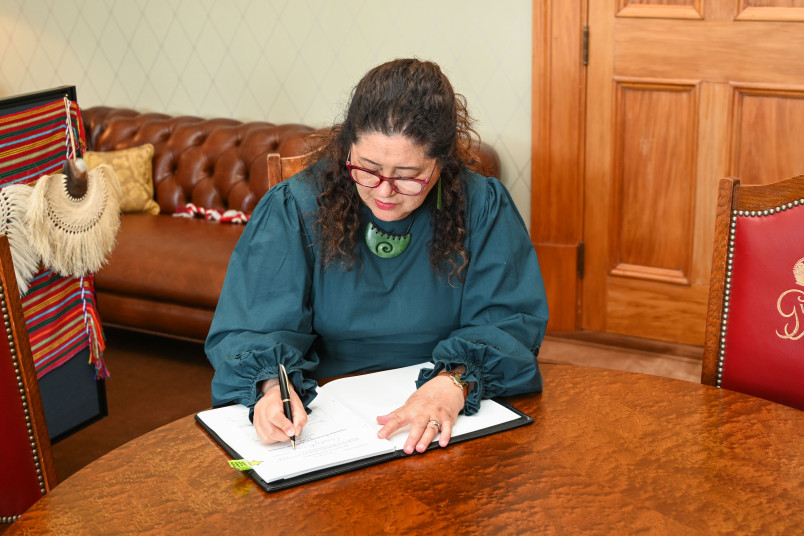
Dame Cindy Kiro gives royal assent to the Citizenship (Western Samoa) (Restoration) Amendment Act, at Government House, Wellington, on 25 November 2024

In 2024, the Citizenship (Western Samoa) (Restoration) Amendment Act gave Samoans born in Samoa between 1924 and 1948, whose New Zealand citizenship was stripped in 1982 under the Citizenship (Western Samoa) Act, a pathway to New Zealand citizenship. The measure was expected to affect up to 3,500 people.

Samoan New Zealanders, compared to other groups such as Dutch New Zealanders who immigrated to New Zealand at the same time, retain a large number of Samoan language speakers.

== Demographics ==
The 1874 census recorded 6 Samoans in New Zealand. Numbers have increased steadily ever since, to 279 in 1936, 1,336 in 1951, 19,711 in 1976, 24,141 in 1981, and 47,118 in 2001.

There were 182,721 people identifying as being part of the Samoan ethnic group at the 2018 New Zealand census, making up 3.9% of New Zealand's population. This is an increase of 38,583 people (26.8%) since the 2013 census, and an increase of 51,618 people (39.4%) since the 2006 census. Some of the increase between the 2013 and 2018 census was due to Statistics New Zealand adding ethnicity data from other sources (previous censuses, administrative data, and imputation) to the 2018 census data to reduce the number of non-responses.

There were 91,443 males and 91,275 females, giving a sex ratio of 1.002 males per female. The median age was 22.8 years, compared to 37.4 years for New Zealand as a whole; 62,688 people (34.3%) were aged under 15 years, 50,229 (27.5%) were 15 to 29, 59,859 (32.8%) were 30 to 64, and 9,942 (5.4%) were 65 or older.

In terms of population distribution, 64.9% of Samoan New Zealanders live in the Auckland region, 27.0% live in the North Island outside the Auckland region, and 8.1% live in the South Island. The Māngere-Ōtāhuhu local board area of Auckland has the highest concentration of Samoan people at 26.8%, followed by the Ōtara-Papatoetoe local board area (24.2%) and the Manurewa local board area (19.7%). Porirua City has the highest concentration of Samoan peoples outside of Auckland at 16.1%. The Kaikōura District had the lowest concentration of Samoan people at 0.2%, followed by the Gore, Queenstown-Lakes, Southland and Waimate districts, all at 0.3%.

A majority of New Zealanders of Samoan ethnicity today are New Zealand-born. At the 2013 census, 62.7 percent of Samoan New Zealanders were born in New Zealand. Of the overseas-born population, 84 percent had been living in New Zealand for at least five years, and 48 percent had been living in New Zealand for at least 20 years.

At the 2013 census, 63.8 percent of Samoan New Zealanders were in the labour force, of which 15.3 percent were unemployed. The large employment industries of Samoans were manufacturing (17.3 percent), health care and social assistance (9.1 percent), and retail trade (8.7 percent).

== Culture ==
In 2013, 56% of ethnic Samoan New Zealanders were able to speak the Samoan language. As of 2018, Samoan is the third most-spoken language in New Zealand, behind English and Māori.

Samoan cultural values, the "Samoan way of life" (fa‘asamoa), are reportedly retained particularly by elderly members of the community, and include respect and mutual help within the extended family (‘aiga), as well as fa‘alavelave (ceremonial and family obligations), and attendance at a Christian church. In 2013, 83.4 percent of Samoans affiliated with at least one religion, compared with 55.0 percent for all New Zealanders.

Traditional tattooing (tatau) is embraced by some Samoan New Zealanders, both men and women, as an expression of cultural identity.

Samoans have contributed significantly to New Zealand culture in the fields of art, music, literature and sport.

=== Arts ===
- Aaradhna – R&B artist (Samoan mother, Indian father)
- Frankie Adams - actress
- Adeaze – R&B Group Name of 2 Artists, Guitarists & Vocalists – Nainz Tupa'i & Viiz Tupa'i
- Nick Afoa - singer
- Alex Aiono – singer/producer (Samoan-New Zealand father)
- KJ Apa – actor (of paternal Samoan descent)
- Tusiata Avia - author
- Teuila Blakely - actress
- Jackie Clarke – actress, comedian
- Joseph Churchward – graphic designer
- David Dallas – rapper (half Samoan)
- Angella Dravid – comedian
- Iosefa Enari – opera singer
- Eteuati Ete – comedian (Laughing Samoans)
- Daniel Faitaua – news presenter (born in Christchurch)
- Tulele Faletolu – worship leader/singer
- David Fane - actor
- Tofiga Fepulea'i – comedian (Laughing Samoans)
- Fatu Feu'u – painter
- Sia Figiel – novelist and poet
- Mario Gaoa – actor, writer and director
- Dei Hamo – rapper
- Jamoa Jam – vocal quartet
- Bob Jahnke - artist
- Jay'ed – singer/songwriter
- Kings – rapper/songwriter
- King Kapisi – hip hop artist
- Freddie Keil – musician
- Oscar Kightley – actor, writer and television presenter
- Yuki Kihara - artist
- John Kneubuhl – television writer
- Beulah Koale - actor
- Ladi 6 – singer/MC
- Jay Laga'aia – actor
- Jawsh 685 – record producer
- Lily Laita – painter and ceramic sculptor
- Nathaniel Lees – actor
- Andy Leleisi'uao - artist
- Jonathan Lemalu – Grammy winning opera singer
- Stacey Leilua - actress
- Daniel Logan - actor
- Pua Magasiva – actor and radio presenter
- Robbie Magasiva – actor
- Rose Matafeo – comedian (Samoan father)
- Karlo Mila - writer and poet
- Naked Samoans – comedy group
- Rene Naufahu – actor, screen writer and director
- Chong Nee – hip hop and R&B writer, producer and singer
- Louis Sutherland – director, actor, two-time winner at Cannes Film Festival
- Savage – rapper
- Scribe – rapper
- Tusi Tamasese – film director
- Michel Tuffery – painter and sculptor
- Lani Tupu - actor
- Jared Turner - actor (Samoan mother)
- Sima Urale - film director and screen writer
- Tha Feelstyle – hip hop artist, rapper
- Rosita Vai – pop and R&B singer
- the Yandall Sisters – singers
- Albert Wendt – writer
- Emily Williams – singer

=== Sports ===
- Maselino Masoe – Boxer (middleweight, Former World Champion)
- Joseph Parker – Boxer
- David Tua – Boxer
- Rodney Reid - Association football player, New Zealand
- Murphy Su'a – Cricketer, New Zealand
- Ross Taylor – Cricketer, New Zealand
- Dakota Kai – Professional Wrestler
- Beatrice Faumuina – Discus thrower (Former World Champion)
- Mark Hunt – Kickboxer in K-1 / mixed martial artist in Pride FC & UFC
- Ray Sefo – Kickboxer in K-1
- Robert Whittaker – mixed martial artist
- Rita Fatialofa – Netball player (Silver Ferns)
- Paula Griffin – Netball player (Silver Ferns)
- April Ieremia – Netball player (Silver Ferns)
- Cathrine Latu – Netball player (Silver Ferns)
- Bernice Mene – Netball player (Silver Ferns)
- Grace Rasmussen – Netball player (Silver Ferns)
- Sheryl Scanlan nee Clarke – Netball player (Silver Ferns)
- Frances Solia – Netball player
- Lorna Suafoa – Netball player (Silver Ferns)
- Maria Tutaia – Netball player (Silver Ferns)
- Linda Vagana – Netball player (Silver Ferns)
- Brad Abbey - Rugby League player
- Jack Afamasaga – Rugby League player
- Bunty Afoa - - Rugby league player
- Fred Ah Kuoi – Rugby League player
- Isaak Ah Mau – Rugby League player
- Leeson Ah Mau – Rugby League player
- Patrick Ah Van – Rugby League Player
- Josh Aloiai - Rugby league player
- Jesse Arthurs - Rugby league player
- Daejarn Asi - Rugby League player
- Nelson Asofa-Solomona – Rugby League player
- Roy Asotasi – Rugby League player
- Renouf Atoni - Rugby league player
- Andrew Bentley - Rugby League player
- Kane Bentley - Rugby League player
- Monty Betham – former professional rugby league footballer & Boxer
- Dean Blore - Rugby League player
- Shawn Blore - Rugby League player
- Dylan Brown - Rugby League player
- Fa'amanu Brown - Rugby League player
- Jahream Bula - Rugby League player
- George Carmont – Rugby League player
- Michael Chee-Kam -Rugby League player
- Erin Clark – Rugby League player
- Oscar Danielson – Rugby League player
- Isaac Davidson – basketball player
- Mark Elia – Rugby League player
- Herman Ese'ese - Rugby League player
- Henry Fa'afili – former professional rugby league footballer & Manu Samoa player
- David Fa'alogo – Rugby League player
- Poasa Faamausili - Rugby league player
- Maurie Fa'asavalu – Rugby League player & Manu Samoa player
- Sonny Fai – Rugby League player
- David Faiumu – Rugby League player
- Bureta Faraimo - Rugby league player
- Sione Faumuina – Rugby League player
- Max Feagai - Rugby League player
- Olsen Filipaina – Rugby League player
- Marvin Filipo – Rugby League player
- Joe Galuvao – Rugby League player
- James Gavet – Rugby League player
- Pita Godinet – Rugby League player
- Harrison Hansen – Rugby League player
- Chanel Harris-Tavita - Rugby League player
- Hymel Hunt - Rugby League player
- Karmichael Hunt - Rugby League player
- Krisnan Inu – Rugby League player
- Masada Iosefa – Rugby League player
- Willie Isa – Rugby League player
- Jamayne Isaako - Rugby League player
- Sam Kasiano – Rugby league player
- Oregon Kaufusi - Rugby league player
- Asu Kepaoa - Rugby league player
- Alofiana Khan-Pereira - Rugby league player
- Keano Kini - Rugby league player
- Tim Lafai – Rugby league player
- Ali Lauitiiti – Rugby League player
- Tasesa Lavea – Rugby League player & Manu Samoa player
- Joseph Leilua – Rugby League player
- Connelly Lemuelu - Rugby League player
- Spencer Leniu - Rugby League player
- Moses Leota – Rugby League player
- Kylie Leuluai – Rugby League player
- Phillip Leuluai – Rugby League player
- Thomas Leuluai – Rugby League player
- Danny Levi - Rugby League player
- Jeff Lima – Rugby League player
- Mason Lino – Rugby League player
- Sam Lisone - Rugby League player
- Isaac Liu - Rugby League player
- Jamahl Lolesi – Rugby League player
- Jarome Luai - Rugby League player
- Patrick Mago - Rugby League player
- Hutch Maiava – Rugby League player
- Deine Mariner - Rugby league player
- Ata Mariota - Rugby League player
- Greg Marzhew - Rugby league player
- Mose Masoe – Rugby League player
- Willie Mason - Rugby League player
- Suaia Matagi – Rugby League player
- Steve Matai – Rugby League player
- Ben Matulino – Rugby League player
- Ken Maumalo – Rugby league player
- Wayne McDade – Rugby League player
- Francis Meli – Rugby League player
- Constantine Mika – Rugby League player
- Thomas Mikaele - Rugby League player
- Junior Moors – Rugby League player
- Ronaldo Mulitalo - Rugby League player
- Zane Musgrove - Rugby League player
- Jeremiah Nanai - Rugby league player
- Frank-Paul Nu'uausala – Rugby League player
- Hitro Okesene – Rugby League player
- Keenan Palasia - Rugby League player
- Iafeta Paleaaesina – Rugby League player
- Sam Panapa – Rugby League player
- Abraham Papalii - Rugby League player
- Isaiah Papali'i - Rugby League player
- Josh Papalii – Rugby League player
- Junior Pauga - Rugby League player
- Jaxson Paulo - Rugby League player
- Joseph Paulo – Rugby League player
- Junior Paulo – Rugby League player
- Franklin Pele - Rugby League player
- Jordan Pereira - Rugby League player
- Eddy Pettybourne – Rugby League player
- Apollo Perelini – Former Rugby league player & Manu Samoa player
- Sam Perrett – Rugby League player
- Dominique Peyroux – Rugby League player
- Willie Poching – Rugby League player
- Frank Pritchard – Rugby League player
- Frank Puletua – Rugby League player
- Tony Puletua – Rugby League player
- Nathaniel Roache - Rugby League player
- Ben Roberts – Rugby League player
- Iva Ropati – Rugby League player
- Jerome Ropati – Rugby League player
- Tea Ropati – Rugby League player
- Setaimata Sa – Rugby League player & Manu Samoa player
- Smith Samau – Rugby League player
- Simi Sasagi - Rugby League player
- Junior Sau – Rugby League player
- Pasami Saulo - Rugby League player
- Andre Savelio - Rugby League player
- Jesse Sene-Lefao - Rugby League player
- Lagi Setu – Rugby League player
- Ava Seumanufagai – Rugby league player
- Jerry Seuseu – Rugby League player
- Tim Simona – Rugby League player
- Tukimihia Simpkins - Rugby League player
- Toafofoa Sipley - Rugby League player
- Jeremy Smith – Rugby League player
- Iosia Soliola – Rugby League player
- David Solomona – Rugby League player
- Denny Solomona - Rugby League player
- Malo Solomona – Rugby League player
- Tupou Sopoaga – Rugby League player
- Chase Stanley – Rugby League player
- Kyle Stanley – Rugby League player
- Jaydn Su'A - Rugby League player
- Sauaso Sue - Rugby League player
- Anthony Swann – Rugby League player
- Logan Swann – Rugby League player
- Sam Tagataese – Rugby League player
- Willie Talau – Rugby League player
- Tony Tatupu – Rugby League player
- Jorge Taufua - Rugby League player
- Mark Taufua – Rugby League player
- Murray Taulagi - Rugby League player
- Misi Taulapapa – Rugby League player
- Martin Taupau - Rugby League player
- Ben Te'o – Rugby League player
- Jazz Tevaga – Rugby League player
- Junior Tia-Kilifi – Rugby League player
- Matthew Timoko - Rugby League player
- Trent Toelau - Rugby league player
- Motu Tony – Rugby League player
- Kelma Tuilagi - Rugby league player
- Tony Tuimavave – Rugby League player
- Braden Uele – Rugby league player
- Wayne Ulugia – Rugby League player
- Matt Utai – Rugby League player
- Joe Vagana – Rugby League player
- Nigel Vagana – Rugby League player
- Taioalo Vaivai - Rugby League player
- Daniel Vidot – Rugby League player
- Ruben Wiki – Rugby League player
- Darrell Williams – Rugby League player
- Antonio Winterstein – Rugby League player
- Frank Winterstein – Rugby League player
- Siua Wong - Rugby League player
- Matthew Wright – Rugby League player
- Cameron Howieson – Association Football player New Zealand Men's
- Dane Ingham – Association football player New Zealand Men's
- Jai Ingham – Association football player New Zealand Men's
- Bill Tuiloma - Association football player New Zealand Men's
- Renee Leota – Association football player New Zealand Women's
- Emma Hunter – Swimmer (Olympics)

==== All Blacks (past & present) ====
- Asafo Aumua – (All Black number 1163)
- John Afoa – (All Black number 1062)
- Sosene Anesi – (All Black number 1054)
- Ben Atiga – (All Black number 1037)
- Graeme Bachop – (All Black number 885)
- Stephen Bachop - (All Black number 925)
- Andrew Blowers – (All Black number 956)
- Olo Brown – (All Black number 910)
- Frank Bunce – (All Black number 915)
- Caleb Clarke – (All Black number 1187)
- Eroni Clarke – (All Black number 919)
- Jerry Collins – (All Black number 1002), captain
- Christian Cullen – (All Black number 952)
- Matt Duffie – (All Black number 1164)
- Charlie Faumuina – (All Black number 1116)
- Ross Filipo – (All Black number 1070)
- Alex Hodgman – (All Black number 1190)
- Carl Hoeft – (All Black number 971)
- Alama Ieremia – (All Black number 942)
- Akira Ioane – (All Black number 1166)
- Josh Ioane – (All Black number 1185)
- Rieko Ioane – (All Black number 1156)
- Michael Jones – (All Black number 882)
- Jerome Kaino – (All Black number 1050)
- Du'Plessis Kirifi – (All Black number 1226)
- Josh Kronfeld – (All Black number 943)
- Pat Lam – (All Black number 928)
- Casey Laulala – (All Black number 1048)
- Nepo Laulala – (All Black number 1139)
- Anton Lienert-Brown – (All Black number 1153)
- Christian Lio-Willie – (All Black number 1225)
- Keith Lowen – (All Black number 1020)
- Steven Luatua – (All Black number 1121)
- Lelia Masaga – (All Black number 1092)
- Chris Masoe – (All Black number 1059)
- Aaron Mauger – (All Black number 1013)
- Nathan Mauger – (All Black number 1008)
- Keven Mealamu – (All Black number 1026), captain
- Liam Messam - (All Black number 1082)
- Brad Mika – (All Black number 1024)
- Dylan Mika – (All Black number 982)
- Richard Mo'unga – (All Black number 1167)
- Mils Muliaina – (All Black number 1033), captain
- Ma'a Nonu – (All Black number 1031)
- Dalton Papalii – (All Black number 1176)
- Stephen Perofeta - (All Black number 1206)
- Augustine Pulu – (All Black number 1136)
- Francis Saili – (All Black number 1126)
- Ardie Savea – (All Black number 1147), captain
- Julian Savea – (All Black number 1111)
- John Schuster – (All Black number 889)
- John Schwalger – (All Black number 1071)
- Kevin Senio – (All Black number 1058)
- Wallace Sititi – (All Black number 1218)
- Dave Solomon – (All Black number 415)
- Frank Solomon – (All Black number 387)
- Rodney So'oialo – (All Black number 1028), captain
- Lima Sopoaga – (All Black number 1145)
- Benson Stanley – (All Black number 1102)
- Jeremy Stanley – (All Black number 963)
- Joe Stanley – (All Black number 874)
- Shaun Stevenson - (All Black number 1212)
- Angus Ta'avao – (All Black number 1175)
- Mark Tele'a – (All Black number 1207)
- Neemia Tialata – (All Black number 1060)
- Filo Tiatia – (All Black number 993)
- Isaia Toeava – (All Black number 1064)
- Ofisa Tonu'u – (All Black number 957)
- Jeffery Toomaga-Allen – (All Black number 1130)
- Ofa Tu'ungafasi – (All Black number 1150)
- Mose Tuiali'i – (All Black number 1042)
- Va'aiga Tuigamala – (All Black number 900)
- Patrick Tuipulotu – (All Black number 1133)
- Roger Tuivasa-Sheck – (All Black number 1204)
- Richard Turner – (All Black number 917)
- Tana Umaga – (All Black number 961), captain
- Peter Umaga-Jensen – (All Black number 1189)
- Victor Vito – (All Black number 1103)
- Bryan Williams – (All Black number 689)
- Sonny Bill Williams – (All Black number 1108)
- Rudi Wulf – (All Black number 1077)

=== General ===
- Tulele Faletolu – worship leader/singer – Hillsong Church
- Samani Pulepule – Preacher – Evangelist

=== Politics ===
- Arthur Anae – politician
- Barbara Edmonds - politician
- Taito Phillip Field – politician
- Mark Gosche – politician
- Luamanuvao Winnie Laban – politician
- Agnes Loheni – politician
- Peseta Sam Lotu-Iiga – politician
- Carmel Sepuloni - politician (20th Deputy Prime Minister of New Zealand)
- William Sio – politician
- Lemauga Lydia Sosene - politician

== See also ==
- New Zealand–Samoa relations
- Samoan Australians
- Solomon Islander New Zealanders
