= New Zealand humour =

New Zealand humour bears some similarities to the body of humour of many other English-speaking countries. There are, however, several regional differences.

== New Zealand comedy themes ==
=== Regional humour ===
New Zealand's remote and agricultural nature is a regular comedy catalyst as seen in the stock character Fred Dagg, a stereotypical farmer, and also in the work of writer Barry Crump.

Wellington has jokes about being windy including the Wellington Blown Away sign on the hill by the airport. As the nation's capital city, political humour is also common. Notable comedy shows with politics as a central theme have included Gliding On by Roger Hall, Public Eye, Spin Doctors, and Facelift.

Suburban themes were explored by Ginette McDonald with her Lynn of Tawa persona.

=== Trans-Tasman rivalry ===
A famous statement by the Prime Minister of New Zealand Robert Muldoon in the 1980s commenting about the increasing exodus of New Zealanders leaving the country to work in Australia was, "New Zealanders who leave for Australia raise the IQ of both countries."

== Comedians ==
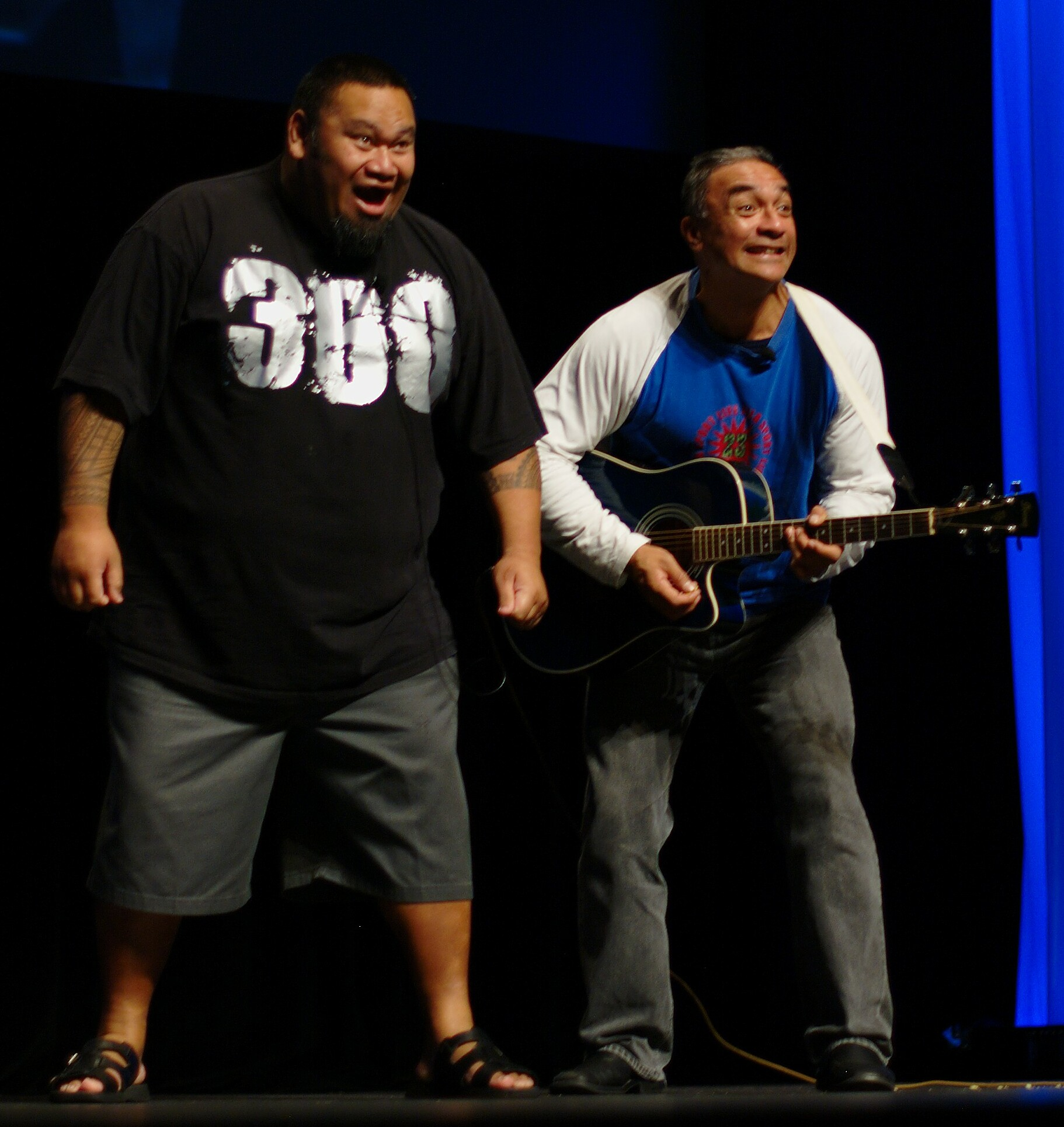
The Laughing Samoans

Some of New Zealand's best known comedians spent a large portion of their careers in Australia. This included John Clarke, known to New Zealanders for his character Fred Dagg, a stereotypical farmer played with precision and style. Clarke's wit later allowed him to extend his repertoire to a series of biting satires, particularly of politicians. He also found an outlet in television series such as The Games and films such as Death in Brunswick.

Other examples include Tony Martin of the 1980s sketch show The D-Generation fame. Three compilations of the Australian national radio program Martin/Molloy earned him ARIA awards. He also wrote and directed the movie Bad Eggs.

Pamela Stephenson was born in New Zealand, made her name in Australia, went to Britain and starred in the sketch comedy Not the Nine O'Clock News, and currently lives in America with her husband Billy Connolly.

Billy T. James dominated New Zealand comedy through the 1980s. His first major role was the lead in TVNZ's Radio Times. James went on to gain his own self-titled show. His characters, along with John Clarke's Fred Dagg set a benchmark for New Zealand comedy.

At the annual New Zealand International Comedy Festival, the Fred Award is presented to the best comedy show of the year, and the Billy T Award is given to the best up-and-coming comedian.

Alan Brough appeared on Spicks and Specks as a writer and team captain. In 2004 he was one third of the radio show Tough Love. He has also appeared in several movies such as Bad Eggs

For several years during the 1970s and 1980s, New Zealand television featured a satirical send-up of current affairs entitled A Week of It. This series, and particularly its two main stars, David McPhail and Jon Gadsby, became for several years a mainstay of New Zealand comedy.

One of New Zealand film director Peter Jackson's first films was Meet the Feebles, a riotous sexual puppet romp.

Pasifika artists known for the comedy work include the Naked Samoans, their first stage production in 1998 was Naked Samoans Talk about Their Knives. They were involved the film Sione's Wedding, and the TV cartoon series bro'Town. Sione's Wedding was the most commercially-successful New Zealand comedy until the release of Taika Waititi's Boy (2010). Tofiga Fepulea'i and Eteuati Ete made up the duo the Laughing Samoans who first performed in 2003 and have a three-part TV show called Laughing Samoans at Large (2010).

Other New Zealand comedians include:

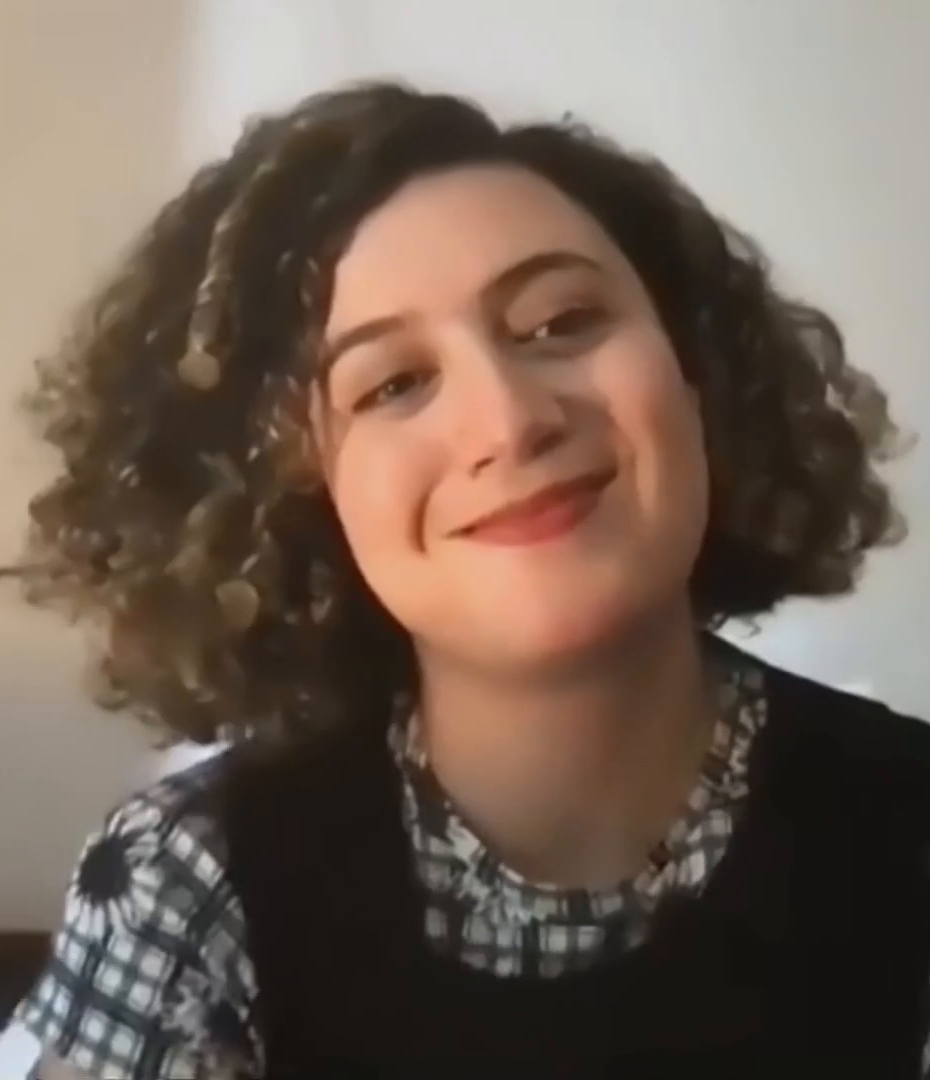
- Rose Matafeo
  Rose Matafeo, 2018 winner of the top comedy award at the Edinburgh Festival Fringe.
- Rhys Darby, stand-up comedian most notorious for his portrayal of Flight of the Conchords manager 'Murray'.
- Raybon Kan, former journalist and lawyer turned comedian.
- Cal Wilson, appearing on Thank God You're Here several times and performing at the Melbourne International Comedy Festival numerous times. Her career in Australia extended to a regular drive-time radio show and weekly coverage of Australian Idol.
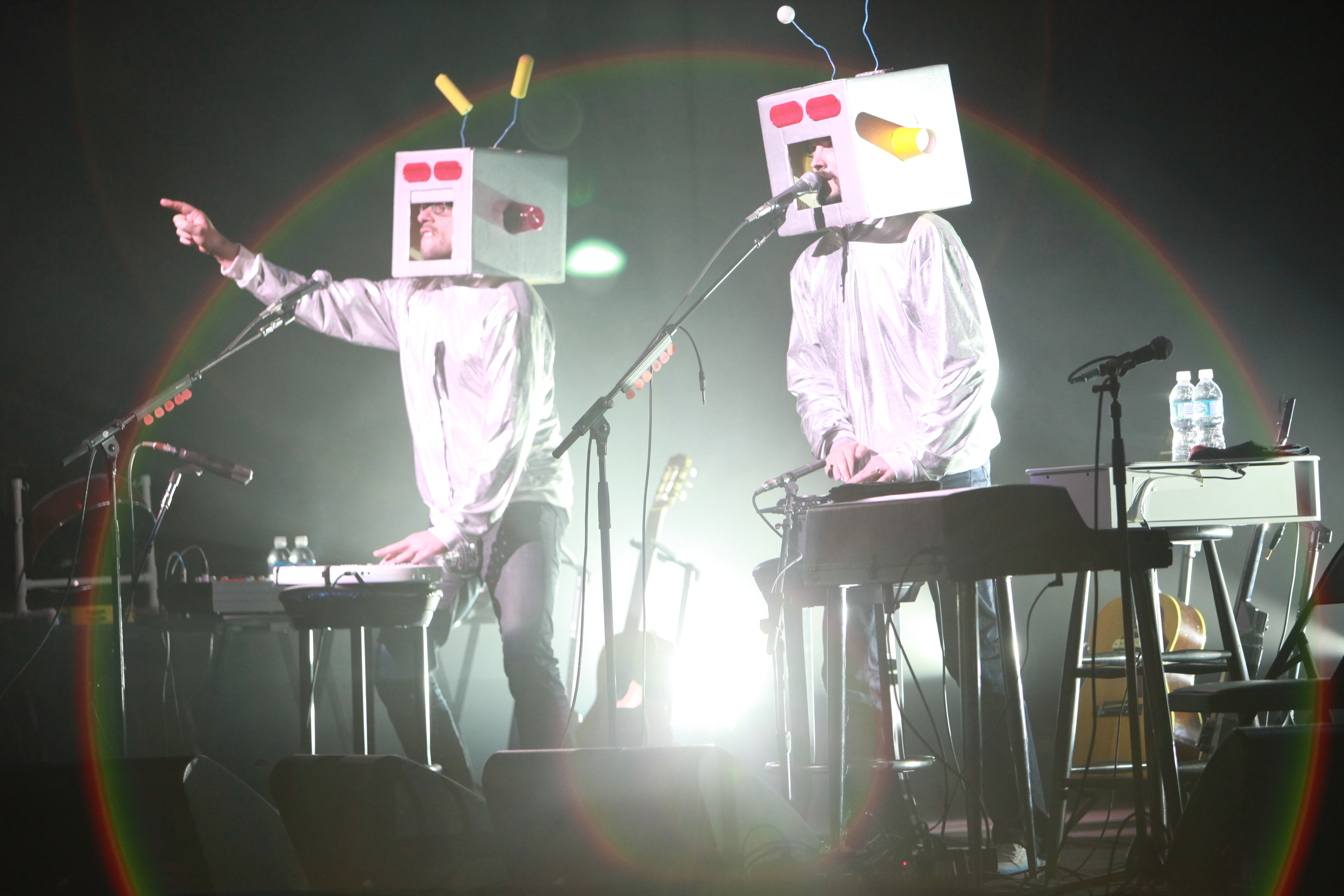
- Flight of the Conchords at the Vogue in 2009
  Bret McKenzie and Jemaine Clement form the partnership Flight of the Conchords, their work including the HBO television series, which followed "the trials and tribulations of a two-man, digi-folk band from New Zealand as they try to make a name for themselves in their adopted home of New York City".
- Taika Waititi (also known as Taika Cohen), Academy Award nominated film director and stand-up comedian.
- Jarred Christmas is an ex-pat New Zealand comic, who makes his living in the United Kingdom. He does much work with the BBC, and won the Chortle comedy award for Best Compere.
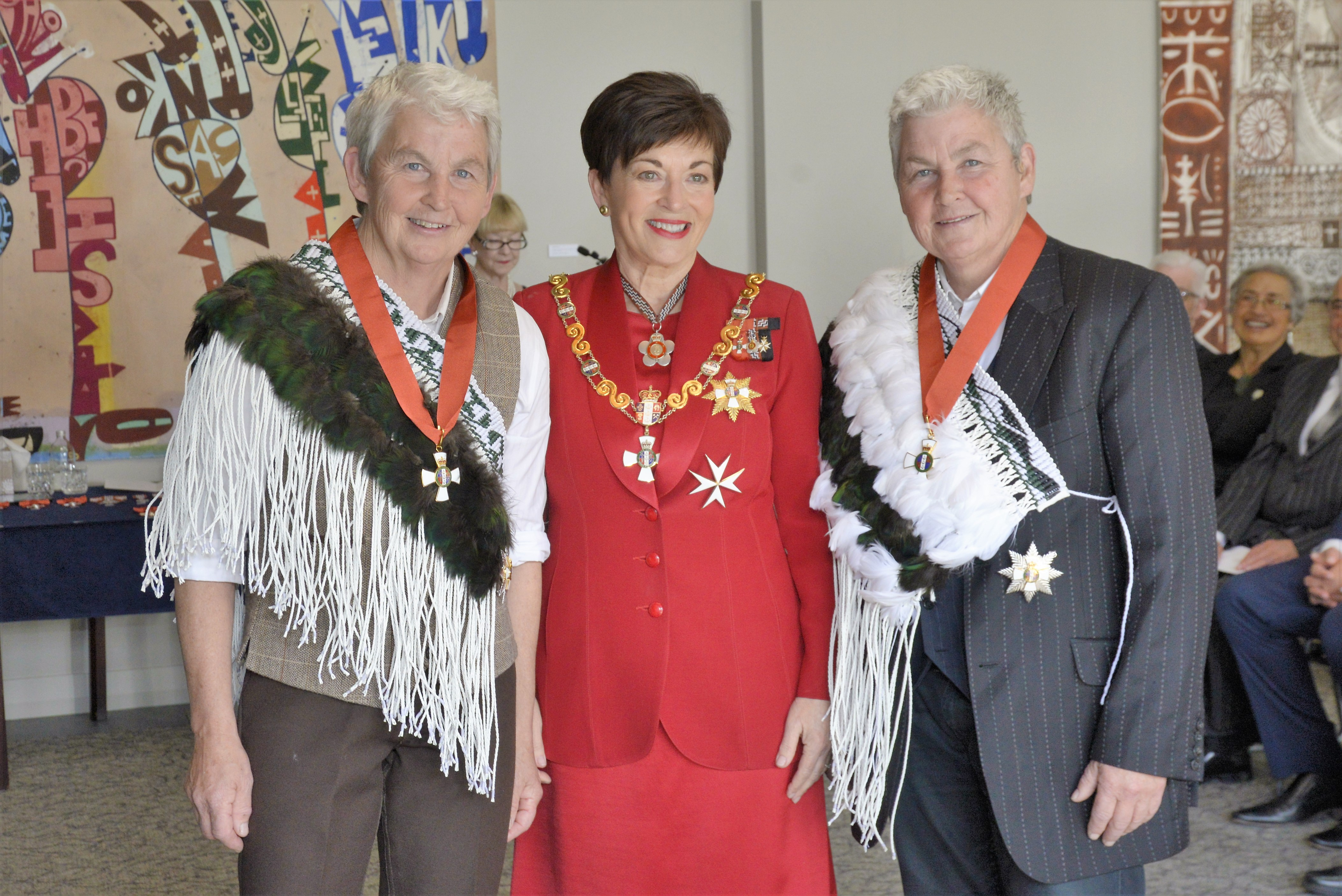
- Jools and Lynda Topp DNZM investiture 2018
  Madeleine Sami is a Fijian Indian/Irish comedian from Auckland. She is best known for the TV series Super City and performing in the play No2.
- Topp Twins
- Jacob Rajan

== Comedy films ==
- Goodbye Pork Pie (1981)
- Tally Ho
- Came a Hot Friday (1985)
- Bad Taste (1987)
- Meet the Feebles (1989)
- Old Scores (1991)
- Forgotten Silver (1995)
- The Price of Milk (2000)
- Scarfies (2001)
- Stickmen (2001)
- Tongan Ninja (2002)
- Sione's Wedding (2006)
- Black Sheep (2006)
- The Devil Dared Me To (2007)
- Men Shouldn't Sing (2007)
- Eagle vs Shark (2007)
- Boy (2010)
- Sione's 2: Unfinished Business (2012)
- Two Little Boys (2012)
- What We Do in the Shadows (2014)
- Hunt for the Wilderpeople (2016)
- The Breaker Upperers (2018)

== Cartoons ==
- Footrot Flats
- Stanley
- Bogor
- Antics
- bro'Town

== Comedy television ==
- 7 Days
- A Week of It
- Back of the Y
- Best Bits
- The Billy T James Show
- Bro'Town
- Eating Media Lunch
- Facelift
- Flight of the Conchords
- Funny Girls
- Glide Time
- Hounds
- Jono and Ben (formerly Jono and Ben at Ten)
- The Jono Project
- Moon TV
- Outrageous Fortune
- The Pretender
- Pulp Sport
- Serial Killers
- Seven Periods with Mr Gormsby
- Super City
- Taskmaster NZ
- Wanna-Ben
- Wellington Paranormal

== See also ==
- Culture of New Zealand § Comedy
