= Leonard Haines =

British flying ace of WWII

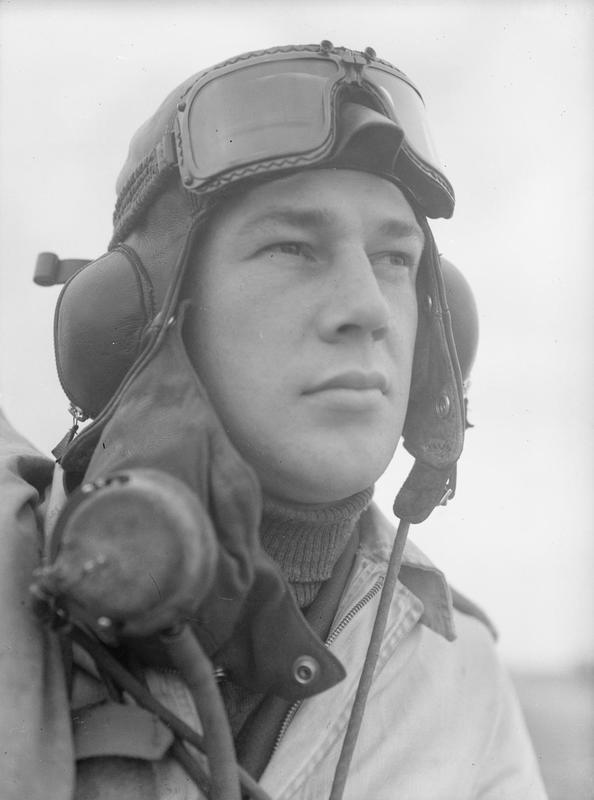
- Haines, September 1940
- Born: December 1919; Melcombe Regis, United Kingdom
- Died: 30 April 1941 (aged 21); Hounslow Barracks, Middlesex, United Kingdom
- Burial place: Hounslow Cemetery, United Kingdom
- Military career
- Allegiance: United Kingdom
- Branch: Royal Air Force
- Service years: 1937–1941
- Rank: Flying Officer
- Unit: No. 19 Squadron
- Conflicts: Second World War: Operation Dynamo; Battle of Britain
- Awards: Distinguished Flying Cross

Leonard Haines, DFC (December 1919 – 30 April 1941) was a flying ace who served in the Royal Air Force (RAF) during the Second World War. During his service with the RAF, he was credited with having destroyed at least eight German aircraft

Born in Melcombe Regis, Haines joined the RAF in 1937. Posted to No. 19 Squadron after his training was completed, he achieved the first of his aerial victories while providing aerial cover for the evacuation beaches at Dunkirk during Operation Dynamo. His unit was involved in the Battle of Britain, during which Haines shot down a number of aircraft. Awarded the Distinguished Flying Cross in recognition of his successes, he was posted to instructing duties in late 1940. He was killed in a flying accident in April 1941, aged 21.

== Early life ==
Leonard Archibald Haines was born in December 1919 in Melcombe Regis, in the United Kingdom, to Archibald and Bertha Charles Haines. He went to Dorchester Grammar School before going on to Queen Elizabeth Grammar School in Wimborne. He joined the Royal Air Force (RAF) in September 1937 on a short service commission. His commission as an acting pilot officer on probation was granted with effect from 28 November 1937 and he was confirmed in his rank the following September. He was subsequently posted to No. 19 Squadron.

== Second World War ==
No. 19 Squadron, based at Duxford, was the first unit in the RAF to operate the Supermarine Spitfire fighter. At the time of the outbreak of the Second World War, the squadron was mostly engaged in convoy patrols. Haines was promoted to flying officer on 27 May 1940, at which time the squadron was involved in providing aerial cover over Dunkirk during Operation Dynamo. On 1 June, Haines destroyed a Messerschmitt Bf 109 fighter to the north east of the evacuation beaches. He also claimed a Heinkel He 111 medium bomber as probably destroyed in the same area.

=== Battle of Britain ===
In the weeks after its operations over Dunkirk, the squadron was involved in trials with cannon-equipped Spitfires. This armament proved to be unreliable, and affected the squadron's operations in the early stages of the Battle of Britain. Haines, flying one of the squadron's machine-gun equipped aircraft, shared in the destruction of a Messerschmitt Bf 110 heavy fighter to the east of Aldeburgh on 19 August. By the start of September, the squadron had reverted to the standard machine-gun equipment and was regularly flying as part of the Duxford Wing. On 3 September, Haines destroyed a Bf 110 over the Thames Estuary and then two days later shot down a Bf 109 near Chatham. He destroyed a Bf 110 over Gravesend on 11 September. On Battle of Britain Day, 15 September, he destroyed three German aircraft: two Bf 109s and a Bf 110.

Haines shared in the shooting down of a Junkers Ju 88 medium bomber over the Thames Estuary on 18 September and, the same day, he probably destroyed a Bf 109 nearby the Isle of Sheppey. His successes saw him awarded the Distinguished Flying Cross in early October, the official announcement being made in The London Gazette. The published citation read:

Flying Officer Haines has destroyed seven enemy aircraft, and assisted in the destruction of another. Twice he has pursued hostile aircraft to France and shot them down. He has shown the utmost courage, tenacity and devotion to duty.

— London Gazette, No. 34964, 8 October 1940

By this time, the pace of operations had begun to slow but No. 19 Squadron still periodically encountered the Luftwaffe and on 5 November Haines, along with Flying Officer Willie McKnight of No. 242 Squadron, destroyed a Bf 109 over Birchington. With two other pilots he shared in shooting down a Bf 110 east of Harwich on 15 November and at the end of the month, destroyed a Bf 109 near Ramsgate.

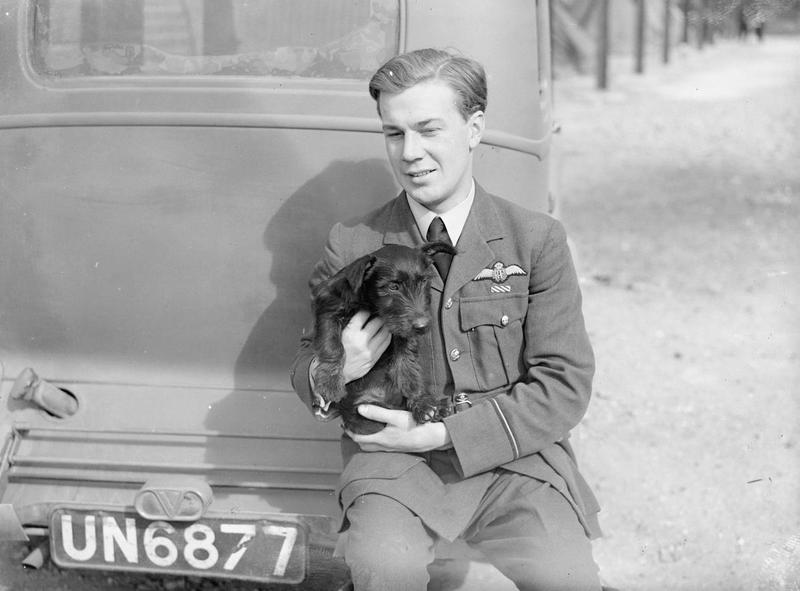
Haines with his dog at Fowlmere, September 1940

=== Later war service ===
At the end of 1940, Haines was posted to No. 53 Operational Training Unit at Heston. He was killed on 30 April 1941 in a flying accident when the Miles Master trainer aircraft he was piloting spun out of control and crashed at Hounslow Barracks in Middlesex. His passenger was also killed. Haines is buried at Hounslow Cemetery. At the time of his death, he was credited with having shot down twelve German aircraft, four of which shared with other pilots, and two probably destroyed. In 2016, his papers, including log books and decorations, were donated to Ball State University, in Indiana, United States.
