= Taitoko =

Taitoko may refer to:

- Taitoko, the Māori name for Levin, New Zealand
  - Taitoko School, primary school in Levin
- William James Taitoko, more commonly known as Billy T. James (1948–1991), New Zealand entertainer, comedian, musician and actor
- Simi Taitoko Fale, more commonly known as Bad Luck Fale (born 1982), Tongan-New Zealand professional wrestler and rugby union player
