= Rongotai College =

School in Wellington, New Zealand

Location
- 170 Coutts Street; Rongotai; Wellington 6022; New Zealand; 41°19′S 174°48′E

Information
- Funding type: State
- Motto: Lumen Accipe et Imperti (Receive the Light and Pass it on)
- Established: 1928; 98 years ago
- Ministry of Education Institution no.: 277
- Principal: Kevin Carter
- Years offered: 9–13
- Gender: Boys
- Enrolment: 716 (July 2026)
- Song: Non Nobis Domine
- Website: www.rongotai.school.nz

Rongotai College is a state single-sex boys' secondary school in the southeastern suburb of Rongotai, Wellington, New Zealand. Serving Years 9 to 13 (ages 12 to 18), the school has 716 students as of July 2026.

About 55 percent of the students are of European heritage, 18 percent identify as Pasifika, 18 percent identify as Asian, and 20 percent are Māori, and there are various Middle Eastern, Latin American, and African students (MELAA).

A highlight for the school is the annual McEvedy Shield athletics event.

== Location ==
The school stands on the Rongotai isthmus which separates Lyall Bay and the Cook Strait to the south from Evans Bay on Wellington Harbour to the north. Having the sea on two sides gives it a particularly bracing microclimate, with gusty winds from the north and, in winter, icy blasts from the south. It is bounded to the east by Wellington Airport, and residential Rongotai to the west. Wellington's city centre is a few kilometres to the northwest.

Rongotai College Rugby Field

There are three sports fields surrounding the school, two designed for cricket and one for rugby. Two of these fields border residential houses and are separated from them by a fence, but many houses have gates through the fence.

== History ==
Rongotai College was opened in 1928 with Mr. Fritz Martyn Renner as its first headmaster and a teaching staff of seven. It was started as an "overspill" for Wellington College, which was overstretched, and Rongotai became the new school for Wellington boys in the eastern suburbs.

Rongotai College originally accepted enrolments from students of intermediate school age. However, when Evans Bay Intermediate School opened its doors in 1964, it became purely a secondary school, catering to boys in what are now years 9 to 13.

The assembly hall, known as Renner Hall, was opened in 1966 and is named after the founding headmaster.

== Achievement ==
The 2013 ERO report was favorable while pointing out areas for improvement, for example in monitoring achievement and attendance levels.

== School leadership ==
=== Principals ===
	Name	Term
1	Fritz Martyn Renner	1928–1945
2	H.A. Heron	1946–1951
3	A.E. Lock	1951–1962
4	N.A. Mackay	1963–1982
5	A.D. Powell	1982–1991
6	G.R. Jarratt	1991–2009
7	K.R. Carter	2009–present

== Houses ==
The four houses at Rongotai College are named after the school's first four headmasters,

- Renner (Red)
- Heron (Blue)
- Lock (Green)
- Mackay (Yellow)

== Notable alumni ==
Dates denote period enrolled as student

=== Arts ===
- Andrew Fagan (1976–1979) – writer, singer and songwriter, former frontsman for The Mockers
- Tofiga Fepulea'i – actor and comedian, member of the stand up comedy duo Laughing Samoans
- Kyle Lockwood (1991–1995) – architectural designer, designer of the Silver fern flag
- Ben Lummis (1992–1996) – singer, New Zealand Idol winner
- Lani Tupu (1969–1972) – actor
- Gordon Walters – artist and designer
- Clive Revill (1944–1947) – actor, singer, two-time Tony Award nominee, Golden Globe nominee

=== Science ===
- Dr Barry Dent (1973–1977) – CEO of BDG Synthesis, (organic chemistry)
- Professor David J. Stevenson (1962-1966) - professor of planetary science at Caltech.
- Professor Alex Malahoff (1951–1956) – pioneered use of submersibles to explore submarine volcanoes, CEO of GNS Science 2002–2012
- Tony Mahon (1947–52) – built a reputation for his extensive research on geothermal energy; awarded Joseph Aidlin Award
- Dr Campbell Nelson FRSNZ (1957–61) – ex-Professor of Earth Studies at Waikato University, awarded 2004 Hutton medal by the Royal Society

=== Miscellaneous ===
- Sam Morgan (1989–1992) – founder of TradeMe
- Gerald Shirtcliff – fraudster
- Ivon Julian – flying ace of the Second World War
- Frank Murphy – flying ace of the Second World War

=== Politics and public service ===
- Hon. Justice Andrew Becroft (1971–1975) – High Court Judge, former Principal Youth Court Judge of New Zealand and Children's Commissioner
- Hon. Justice Richard Heron (dec.) (1948–1954) – former High Court judge
- Hon. Justice Rhys Harrison KC – former Court of Appeal judge (2010-2018), and former High Court judge (2001-2010)
- Hon. Justice Tony Doogue – former High Court judge (1986-2002)
- Sir Crawford Falconer KCMG - Diplomat, former New Zealand Ambassador and Permanent Representative to the World Trade Organisation (WTO)
- David Farrar (1981–1985) – political activist, blogger and pollster
- Professor Stuart McCutcheon (1968–1972) – Vice-Chancellor, the University of Auckland
- Rear Admiral E.C. (Ted) Thorne CB, CBE, Rtd (1935–1938) – Chief of Navy 1972–1975
- Peter Button – OBE, rescue helicopter pilot.

=== Sport ===
==== Athletics ====
- Derek Froude (1973–1977) – represented New Zealand in the men's marathon, at the Olympics in 1984 and 1992
- Paul Lloyd (1979–1984) – represented New Zealand in the men's 110m hurdles, at the Commonwealth Games, Auckland in 1990
- Shaka Sola - a shot putter and discus thrower who represented Samoa in discuss at the Olympics in 2004 and world champiopnships in 2005

==== Basketball ====
- Troy McLean – Wellington Saints and former Tall Blacks basketball player
- Chris Tupu - former Tall Blacks basketball player and former Assistant Coach of NZ Under-17 basketball team at 2021 World Championships

==== Cricket ====
- Bruce Edgar (1970–1974) – former New Zealand cricketer
- Don Neely – cricket historian, administrator, and former Wellington player
- Jeetan Patel (1994–1998) – Black Cap (New Zealand cricketer)
- Barry Sinclair – former New Zealand Test captain
- Ian D S Smith (1970–1973) – sports commentator and former New Zealand cricketer

==== Football ====
- Billy Harris (1977–1981) – New Zealand football player
- Chris Killen (1995–1998) – New Zealand football player
- Jesse Randall (2016-2020) - New Zealand football player
- Shane Rufer (1974–1979) – New Zealand football player
- Wynton Rufer (1976–1979) – New Zealand football player
- Terry Serepisos (1977–1981) – former owner of Wellington Phoenix FC
- Michael Utting – New Zealand football player

==== Hockey ====
- Mitesh Patel (1990–1994) – Black Sticks (New Zealand hockey player)

==== Rugby League ====
- Sione Faumuina (1994–1997) – rugby league player, Castleford Tigers, formerly New Zealand Warriors and North Queensland Cowboys
- Joseph Tapine (2007–2011) – rugby league player, Canberra Raiders, formerly Newcastle Knights

==== Rugby Union ====
- Roy Kinikinilau (1993–1998) – rugby union player, Waikato and Chiefs, formerly Hurricanes, Highlanders
- Motu Matu'u – Wellington Hurricanes , Manu Samoa Hooker
- Grant Nisbett (1964–1968) – sports broadcaster
- Ma'a Nonu – All Black Second Five-Eighth
- Mark Reddish – rugby union player, Wellington Lions, Hurricanes, Highlanders
- Ardie Savea – All Black, Wellington Lions, Wellington Hurricanes, Moana Pasifika, Kobelco Kobe Steelers Flanker
- Julian Savea – All Black, Wellington Lions, formerly New Zealand Sevens team, IRB International junior player of the year, Wellington Hurricanes winger
- Ofisa "Junior" Tonu'u (1999–2000) – All Black halfback
- Graham Williams (1956–1963) – All Black flanker
- Mick Williment (1953–1957) – All Black fullback

==== Wrestling ====
- Al Hobman dec. – former professional wrestler, trainer and promoter

==== Yachting ====
- Greg Wilcox (1974–1978) – former New Zealand world champion yachtsman OK Dinghy class

== Videoed Canings Controversy ==
In October 1981, newspapers reported Principal, Noel Mackay, acknowledging that he had videoed the canings of about 25 boys. Mackay explained this as an experiment to see why experienced teachers often 'miss the target' and leave boys with embarrassing marks on their lower buttocks. Statements of support and criticism for Mackay followed. Both the Rongotai Parents' Association and Rongotai Ladies Auxiliary backed the Principal. Some students signed a petition in support of Mackay. The Education Department declined to comment, believing the matter was strictly between the Board and the Principal.

The Campaign Against Violence in Education (CAVE) called a special meeting to consider the Rongotai experiment. A CAVE spokesperson said the Rongotai case confirmed their fears of the sort of abuse they had suspected went on in schools. He added, "I find it rather creepy. The act of beating a young person is nasty in itself - photographing that nastiness is almost obscene."

The Governing Board appears to have been unaware of the filming before August 1981. The Board later asked for the practice to stop and for all videos to be erased. Mr Mackay offered his resignation, but the Board declined and set up a Committee of Inquiry. Mr Mackay stated that his offer of resignation was not linked to the videos.

Following a report from the Committee in November 1981, the Board found that Mr Mackay had acted within his authority while filming the canings and expressed their confidence in him.

Peter Street had complained to the Board after learning his son had been filmed during a caning. Mr Street, complained that his questions had not been answered by the inquiry and spoke of a whitewash. He asked the Board why there were inconsistencies in the answers given to him earlier by Mr Mackay and the Board chairman concerning the reasons for the experiment.

The Board collected all copies of the inquiry report and destroyed them.

In response to a 2019 allegation made by a former student of sexual impropriety by Mackay, the Rongotai College Board of Trustees stated they were unaware of the complaint until contacted by a reporter. The Chair of the Trustees added that the school and Board '... have strong protocols in place around the reporting and investigation of all forms of abuse... allegations will be taken seriously, investigated thoroughly and handled with confidentiality.'

== Notes ==
Rongotai College Building Map

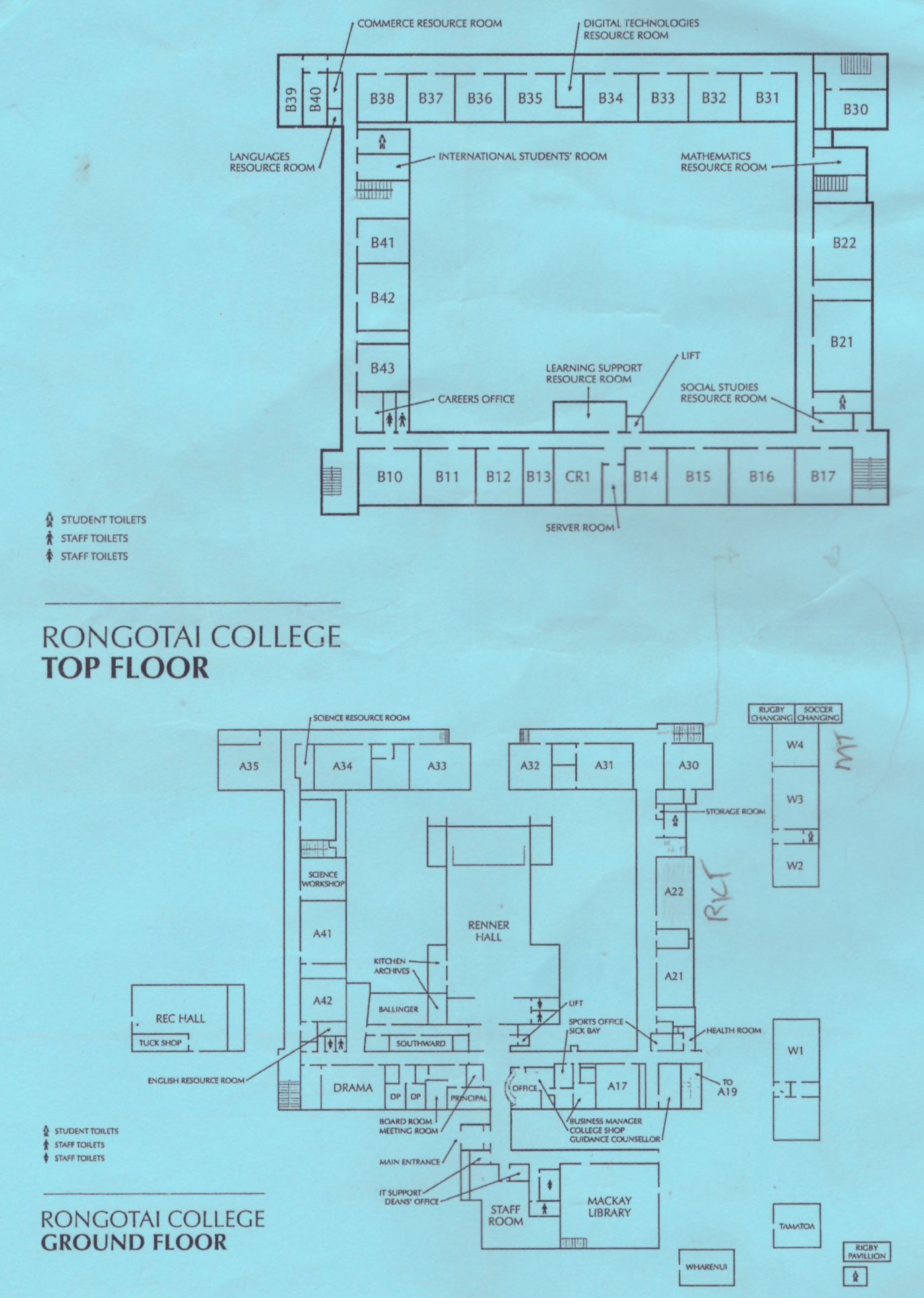
