= Andrew Becroft =

New Zealand judge

The Honourable Andrew Becroft QSO
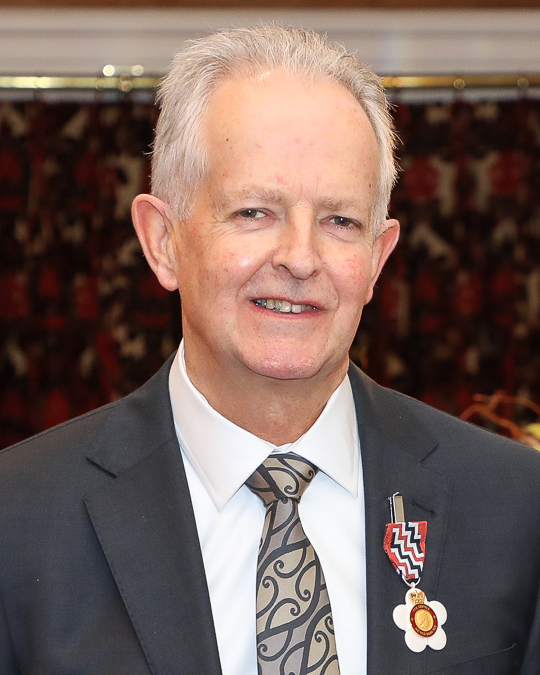
- Becroft in 2022

Justice of the High Court
- Incumbent
- Assumed office 2 May 2023

Children's Commissioner
- In office May 2016 – October 2021
- Appointed by: Anne Tolley; Carmel Sepuloni
- Preceded by: Russell Wills
- Succeeded by: Frances Eivers

Personal details
- Born: Andrew John Becroft Kuala Lumpur, Malaysia
- Education: University of Auckland
- Profession: Barrister

Andrew John Becroft QSO is a New Zealand lawyer, jurist and public servant. Since 2023, he has been a justice of the High Court of New Zealand.

Becroft was appointed a judge in the District Court in 1996. He served as principal judge of the Youth Court from 2001 to 2016. He was Children's Commissioner from 2016 to 2021.

== Education and early career ==
Becroft was born in Kuala Lumpur, Malaysia, and attended Rongotai College before graduating from the University of Auckland with a Bachelor of Arts and Bachelor of Laws (with Honours) in 1981. He worked at Fortune Manning, a neighbourhood law office in Grey Lynn, Auckland, until 1986, when he set up a steering group with another lawyer, Johnny Moses, who later became a judge, and established the Māngere Law Centre where he worked until 1993. Between 1993 and 1996, Becroft was a criminal barrister in South Auckland, specialising in traffic and criminal litigation.

He was appointed to the District Court bench, sitting in Whanganui in 1996, and became principal judge of the Youth Court of New Zealand in 2001. After serving as Children's Commissioner from 2016 to 2021, Becroft was appointed to the High Court, taking up the appointment on 2 May 2023.

== Appointment as Children's Commissioner ==
The Children's Commissioner is an independent Crown Entity set up initially under the Oranga Tamariki Act 1989, later reformed under the Children's Commissioner Act 2003, to advocate for the interests, rights and wellbeing of children and young people in New Zealand. When Becroft was appointed on 3 May 2016 to the role the Children's Commissioner, Anne Tolley, Minister of Social Development in the New Zealand Government at the time, noted that the position involved being an independent advocate for the rights of children, and that his experience in dealing with "troubled and at-risk children...[would be]... vital in the development of a youth justice service aimed at preventing offending and reoffending". Becroft said he accepted the role as "a genuine privilege at a crucial time", and politicians from other parties welcomed the appointment. After announcing on 10 July 2019 that Becroft would continue as Children's Commissioner until June 2021, Carmel Sepuloni said that ensuring consistency in leadership in the role was important at that time because changes were being developed to monitor Oranga Tamariki, and the "scope of the Children's Commissioner’s role will also be extended to monitor young people under the Oranga Tamariki Act...to recognise and respond to the needs of Māori children and their whānau". Becroft later agreed to remain in the position until 31 October 2021 to allow time for his successor to be found. He was succeeded in the position by Judge Frances Eivers, who in accepting the role, acknowledged the contribution of Becroft in working tirelessly to improve the lives of many children and young people in New Zealand.

== Monitoring and advocacy ==
=== Oranga Tamariki ===
Becroft challenged the independence of a new departmental agency set up the New Zealand Government in 2021 to monitor the standards of state care for children overseen by Oranga Tamariki. He had previously recommended that the monitor be located within an autonomous Crown entity and raised concerns that the Māori advisory group which the government planned to set up, needed the "partnership and co-governance involving Māori" demanded by the Treaty of Waitangi. As the debate about this continued into 2022, Becroft was quoted in a news item as saying that "an independent monitor, empowered to speak out as a watchdog on behalf of New Zealand’s children, was required".

He has called for a changed model to ensure the welfare of at-risk children, specifically around the removal of children from their families by Oranga Tamariki. While acknowledging that at times it may be necessary to remove a child during a crisis, Becroft has said that in particular, it was likely due to a high case load of vulnerable children, that social workers could be insufficiently resourced to build a structure of consultation and cooperation with Māori stakeholders and support organisations in the interests of tamariki Māori. He suggested an alternative model that aimed at strengthening families, and by planning that focused on "early intervention work and prevention...[involving]...many more social workers, resources and hours, but in the long-run it may well end up much cheaper".

=== Protection of Māori and Pasifika children ===
Early in Becroft's role as Children's Commissioner, Te Runanga o Ngāi Tahu noted that Becroft's appointment was one of several political and policy changes that were aimed at keeping children safe from violence, abuse and neglect and that in his role as a Youth Court Judge he was familiar with the misconceptions about why Māori children were disproportionately reflected in family violence and youth offending statistics. It was noted Becroft had said that there needed to be a more strategic approach toward changing systems and structures that included an explicit commitment to working with whānau, hapū and iwi.

In 2017, Becroft spoke at the annual conference of Te Hunga Rōia Māori o Aotearoa (New Zealand Māori Law Society) and traced developments in how the State had provided for the care and protection of children and youth justice since the implementation of the Oranga Tamariki Act 1989 as an update of previous legislation. He said that the legislation made it a requirement for whānau, hapū and iwi to be consulted whenever a child was to be removed by the state or arrested, but claimed that the "disproportional amount of Māori children in CYFs care – and overrepresentation of Māori in the wider judicial and prison systems" reflected a systemic failure.

Becroft later went on record in 2021 as saying that of the high percentage of children living in poverty, tamariki Māori, Pasifika and disabled children, were overrepresented in the figures and "the width and depth of the inequities in child wellbeing [was] shocking".

One of Becroft's achievements was the development of a role for a Māori Assistant Children's Commissioner and he told E-Tangata news that this gave him insight into issues faced by Māori and assisted in building relationships honouring Te Tiriti o Waitangi and enabling more devolution of resources to Māori organisations and groups to help monitor the performance of Oranga Tamariki in protecting children.

=== Child poverty ===
In 2018, Becroft outlined some of the challenges posed by child poverty and noted that there are many internationally agreed factors used to measure its extent and causes, including "adverse social gradients that were clearly dependent on poverty". Becroft presented at the Child Action Poverty Group Summit on 18 November 2019, outlining a vision of what needed to be done to address child poverty in New Zealand. In looking forward he stressed the importance of implementing the Welfare Expert Advisory Group (WEAG) recommendations to the New Zealand Government, increases in benefits involving children, free school lunches and increases in social and community housing.

=== Engagement in education ===
In his role as the principal Youth Court judge, Becroft took a public position on the correlations between youth offending and disengagement from school. He stated that young people "outside the school system are virtually the whole of the problem in Youth Court,...[and expressed]...increasing concerns as to the number of young offenders who have slipped through the educational net because of undiagnosed learning disabilities". In a 2014 paper, Becroft identified school — along with family, friends and community — as being key "protective factors against future adverse life outcomes, including criminal offending". In the same paper, he also called disengagement from school a "red flag for a high risk of adverse health outcomes...[that had]...prompted action by ADHB and school-based health services to conduct health assessments on suspended or disengaged youth".

In a presentation at the New Zealand Principals Federation Conference on 20 September 2017, Becroft identified the key challenges in keeping students engaged in education. He noted that dealing with issues such as bullying and attendance required the building of resilience of children, but that the key was accepting the link between poverty and engagement in school, acknowledging the disparity between Māori and Pākehā child wellbeing rates and identifying and working with meeting the special needs of some students.

== Associations ==
In his role as the presiding District Court judge, Becroft called a public meeting in Whanganui in 1999 to focus on developing restorative justice in the youth courts. As a result of this meeting, the Whanganui Restorative Justice Trust was established and Becroft later became the patron of the trust.

He edited the LexisNexis publication Becroft and Hall's Transport Law, a work on road traffic law to assist lawyers in advising their clients on "technical and general aspects of traffic offences and extensive guidance to sentencing for traffic offences". This work formed the basis of another book, Driving Under the Influence, co-edited by Becroft in 2018.

As patron of the New Zealand Speech-language Therapists and Speak Easy Associations which support people with speech impediments, Becroft has said that experience with a stutter in his early life helped him to understand issues for young offenders with disabilities who are often victims themselves and in New Zealand a high percentage had some involvement with State child care systems.

Becroft is president of the Tertiary Students Christian Fellowship (NZ) Inc., and a former council member of the Auckland District Law Society and the New Zealand Law Society.

== Honours and awards ==
In 2009, Becroft received an award from the Public Relations Institute of New Zealand as Communicator of the Year. He was the recipient of a Distinguished Alumni Award from the University of Auckland in 2010. In 2018, he was the winner of the Public Service Wellingtonian of the Year Award for the work he did as Children's Commissioner in helping vulnerable young people. In being named as a semi-finalist for the 2022 New Zealander of the Year Awards, Becroft was noted for being "vocal in his calls for further resourcing of the Royal Commission's Inquiry into Abuse in Care and [as] a tireless campaigner for the rights of children".

In the 2022 Queen's Birthday and Platinum Jubilee Honours, Becroft was appointed a Companion of the Queen's Service Order, for services to the judiciary, children and youth.
