= Graham Williams (rugby union) =

New Zealand rugby union player (1945–2018)

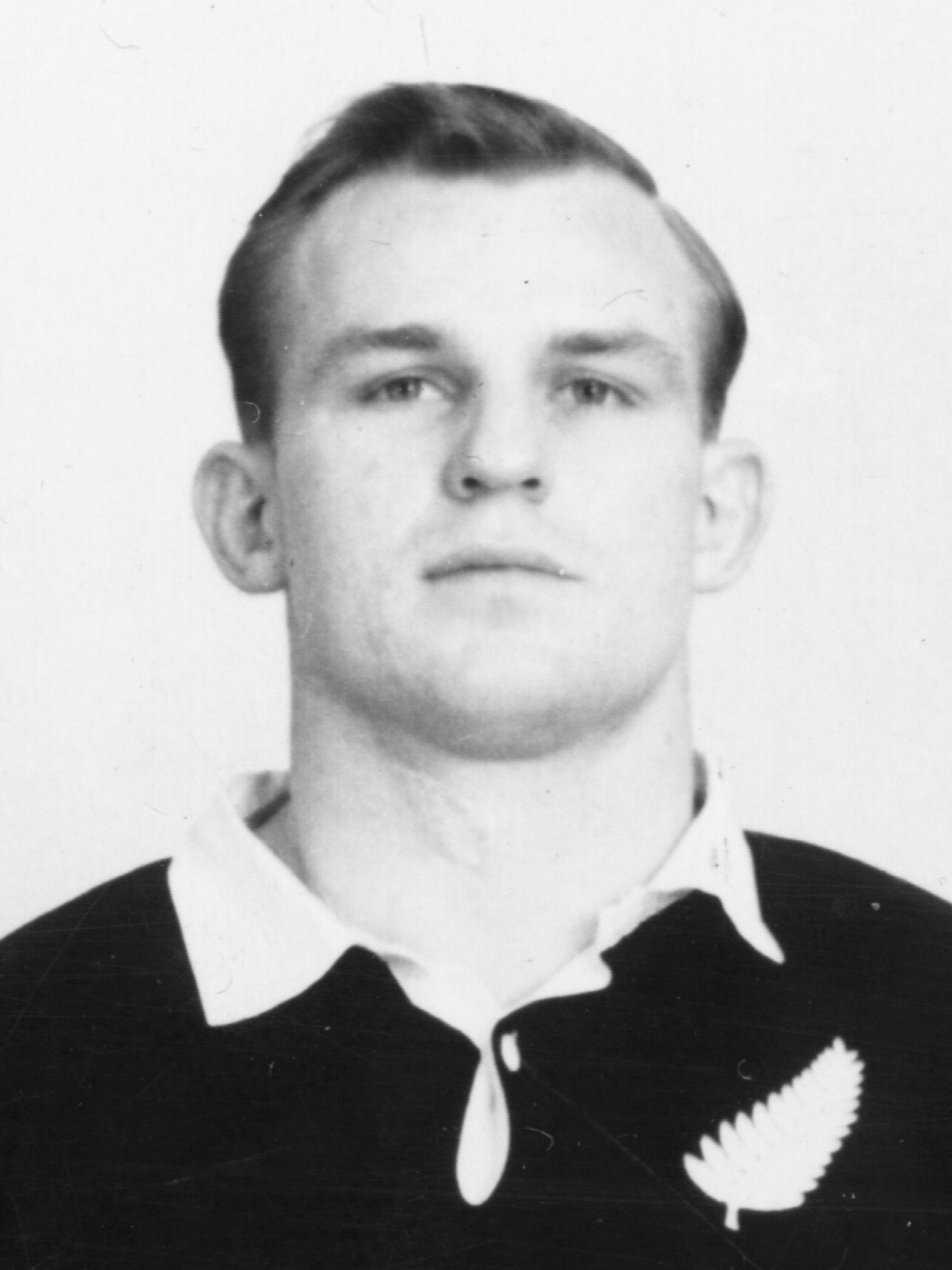
- Born: Graham Charles Williams; 26 January 1945 Wellington, New Zealand
- Died: 25 January 2018 (aged 72) Wellington, New Zealand
- Height: 1.83 m (6 ft 0 in)
- Weight: 89 kg (196 lb)
- School: Rongotai College

Rugby union career
- Position: Flanker
Provincial / State sides
Years	Team	Apps	(Points)
1964–76	Wellington	174	
International career
Years	Team	Apps	(Points)
1967–68	New Zealand	5	(0)

Graham Charles Williams (26 January 1945 – 25 January 2018) was a New Zealand rugby union player. A flanker, Williams represented Wellington at a provincial level, and was a member of the New Zealand national side, the All Blacks in 1967 and 1968. He played 18 matches for the All Blacks, including five internationals.

Williams died in Wellington on 25 January 2018, having suffered from frontal lobe dementia and motor neurone disease.
