= Ivon Julian =

New Zealand flying ace of WWII

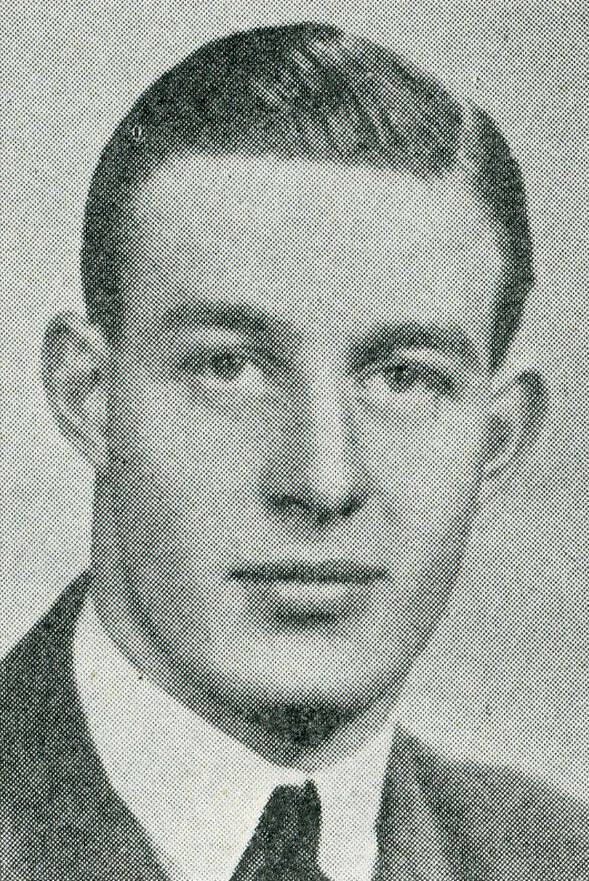
- Born: 20 October 1917; Te Kūiti, New Zealand
- Died: 29 August 1999 (aged 81); Auckland, New Zealand
- Military career
- Allegiance: New Zealand
- Branch: Royal New Zealand Air Force
- Rank: Squadron Leader
- Commands: No. 242 Squadron
- Conflicts: Second World War: Battle of Singapore; Dutch East Indies campaign
- Awards: Distinguished Flying Cross

Ivon Julian, DFC (20 October 1917 – 29 August 1999) was a New Zealand flying ace of the Royal New Zealand Air Force (RAF) during the Second World War. He is credited with the destruction of at least five aircraft.

From Te Kūiti, Julian joined the RNZAF in January 1940 and was sent to the United Kingdom to serve with the Royal Air Force once his training was complete. He was posted to No. 232 Squadron which flew Hawker Hurricane fighters on home defence duties in Scotland and the north of England for much of 1941. The squadron was sent to Singapore following the Japanese invasion of Malaya, and beginning in February 1942 and the next several weeks, Julian destroyed several Japanese aircraft in the aerial campaign over Singapore and the Dutch East Indies. At the start of March he became the commander of No. 242 Squadron but within days became a prisoner of war. Spending the rest of the war in captivity, he was recognised for his services of early 1942 with an award of the Distinguished Flying Cross. Returning to civilian life as a business man, he retired to Auckland where he died in 1999, aged 81.

== Early life ==
Ivon Julian was born on 20 October 1917 in Te Kūiti, New Zealand. He received his educatation at Rongotai College before going onto Wellington Technical College. He was working as a salesman at the time of the outbreak of the Second World War.

== Second World War ==
Julian enlisted in the Royal New Zealand Air Force (RNZAF), but was not called up for training until January 1940. He duly gained his 'wings' and was sent to the United Kingdom to serve with the Royal Air Force in September. He was posted to No. 232 Squadron in January 1941. His unit was a fighter squadron equipped with Hawker Hurricanes and based at Elgin from where it carried out convoy patrols. Later in the year it moved south to Ouston and began preparing for assignment overseas. It was intended to relocate the squadron to the Middle East but during transit, it was diverted to Singapore following the Japanese invasion of Malaya.

=== Battle of Singapore ===
An advance party of the squadron's flying personnel arrived in Singapore on 17 January 1942 but Julian, now a flight lieutenant having been commissioned an officer the previous year, was part of a later group traveling aboard the aircraft carrier HMS Indomitable. He flew a Hurricane from the carrier's flight deck on 27 January, making for Java in the Dutch East Indies. Operations commenced from Palembang on Sumatra but on 5 February a detachment, including Julian, was sent to Kallang on Singapore. Making his first sortie the same day, Julian's Hurricane was damaged in an engagement with Japanese fighters. On 7 February, he damaged a Japanese fighter over the island. Two days later, he probably shot down one Japanese bomber and damaged three others, also over Singapore. On a subsequent sortie the same day, he destroyed a light bomber in the vicinity of Pasir Laba.

The detachment returned to Palembang but later in February, Sumatra was invaded by the Japanese. Intensive aerial operations followed, with No. 232 Squadron carrying out defensive sorties as well as engaging in aerial engagements. Its airfield at Palembang was captured on 14 February and much of the squadron's records, including pilot's logbooks, were lost. Senior ground personnel were also taken prisoner of war and meant that there was no one to receive combat reports. The loss of Palembang necessitated the evacuation of what was left of the squadron to Tjililitan on Java. On 15 February, Julian destroyed a Mitsubishi F1M floatplane on the water off Bangka Island. Strafing attacks were also made on Japanese shipping and airfields, with Julian reporting a particularly successful sortie carried out on barges carrying Japanese troops along a river towards Palembang.

Julian's unit was formally disbanded later in the month, and he became part of No. 242 Squadron, also operating from Tjililitan. On 20 February Julian destroyed a fighter in the area. At the start of March, he was promoted to squadron leader and given command of the squadron, after more senior officers were evacuated to Australia. No. 242 Squadron continued to operate against the Japanese as the campaign in the Dutch East Indies drew to a close. He destroyed a fighter on 4 March and two days later shot down a bomber near Lembang. The Japanese duly completed their capture of Java and Julian and the survivors of his squadron became prisoners of war.

=== Prisoner of War ===
Initially held in a camp at Semplak, Julian was soon sent to Changi Prison on Singapore for several weeks before being shipped to Taiwan. He was held here for two years until in 1944, he was transported to Nagasaki, in Japan. There he laboured in a coal mine. Later in the war he was taken to Hoten Camp near Mukden, in Manchuria. Prisoners from this camp were used in germ warfare experiments at Harbin. Julian was part of a group scheduled to be taken to Harbin but the seizure of the camp by American paratroopers in August 1945 meant that he never went. The RNZAF had implemented measures for repatriation of its personnel held prisoners of war from camps in China and most were returned to New Zealand by October.

The following year Julian was awarded the Distinguished Flying Cross "...in recognition of gallant and distinguished services rendered during, the period of operations against the Japanese in Malaya and the Netherlands East Indies terminating in March, 1942." He was formally discharged from the RNZAF in November 1946.

== Later life ==
Although returning to civilian life, Julian remained in the RNZAF reserve until 1972. He worked as a business man and when he retired, he settled in Auckland. He died there on 29 August 1999. He is credited with having shot down at least five aircraft, with two more probably destroyed. He damaged three others and is also credited with destroying one aircraft on the ground. Details for some of these claims are not available due to the loss of No. 232 Squadron's records during the Japanese invasion of Sumatra.
