= Willie McKnight =

Canadian flying ace (1918-1941)

William McKnight
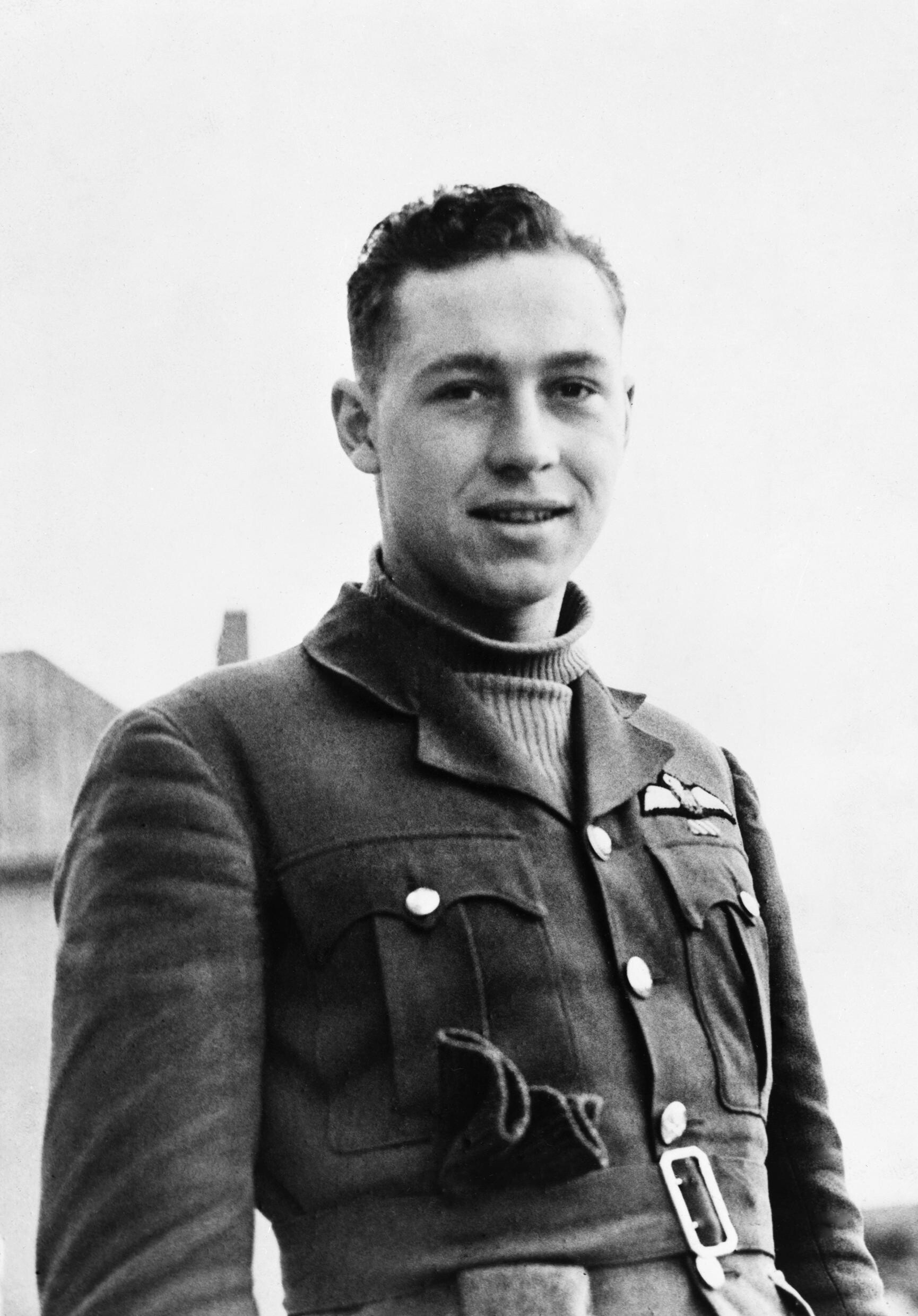
- Born: 18 November 1918; Edmonton, Alberta, Canada
- Died: 12 January 1941 (aged 22); Near Gravelines, English Channel
- Military career
- Allegiance: United Kingdom
- Branch: Royal Air Force
- Service years: 1939–1941
- Rank: Flying Officer
- Nickname: "Willie"
- Unit: No. 242 Squadron
- Conflicts: World War II: Battle of France; Battle of Britain; Circus offensive †
- Awards: Distinguished Flying Cross & Bar

William Lidstone McKnight, DFC & Bar (18 November 1918 – 12 January 1941) was a Canadian flying ace with the Royal Air Force (RAF) of the Second World War. He was Canada's fifth-highest scoring ace of the war, credited with shooting down nineteen aircraft.

From Alberta, McKnight joined the RAF in early 1939 and served in No. 242 Squadron during the final phase of the Battle of France, covering the evacuation of the British Expeditionary Force from Dunkirk and then the Allied retreat from Brittany, during which he claimed his first aerial victories. Afterwards he was briefly hospitalised due to exhaustion. He flew in the Battle of Britain, often as wing man to Squadron Leader Douglas Bader, claiming several more victories. Twice awarded the Distinguished Flying Cross, he was shot down and killed on 12 January 1941 during a sortie to Gravelines.

== Early years ==
William Lidstone "Willie" McKnight was born in Edmonton, Alberta, Canada on 18 November 1918. He grew up in Calgary where he attended Crescent Heights High School. Although he achieved high marks academically, he was a high-spirited student, often causing mischief. After completing his schooling, he went to medical school at the University of Alberta. In February 1939 he joined the Royal Air Force (RAF) on a short service commission.

McKnight began training in mid-April at No. 6 Flying Training School (FTS) at Little Rissington as an acting pilot officer on probation. Still prone to mischief, he was twice placed under arrest and confined to his barracks during the course of his training. Despite his misdemeanors, he duly gained his 'wings'.

== Second World War ==
In November 1939, McKnight was posted to No. 242 Squadron. This had been formed on 30 October 1939 at Church Fenton with Canadians as its flying personnel. The first aircraft assigned to the squadron were Blenheim MK IF twin-engined fighters and Fairey Battle light bombers but Hawker Hurricane fighters were sent in January 1940. McKnight chose to personalise his aircraft with a cartoon of a jackboot kicking Adolf Hitler and an image of the Grim Repear holding a sickle in its hand. After transitioning to the more potent Hurricane, the squadron became operational in March 1940. By this time McKnight had been confirmed in his pilot officer rank.

=== Battle of France ===
As part of the British Expeditionary Force (BEF), No. 242 Squadron began operations over France in mid-May, a detachment being based at French airfields. McKnight meanwhile had been attached to No. 607 Squadron, in France, but was there for only two days before being transferred to No. 615 Squadron at Abbeville. On 19 May, McKnight scored his first victory patrolling near Cambrai destroying a Messerschmitt Bf 109 fighter.

On 21 May McKnight was withdrawn to Britain and a few days later rejoined No. 242 Squadron, stationed at Biggin Hill. By this time, the retreating BEF and allied armies were being pushed into Dunkirk and the squadron flew patrols over the area. McKnight shot down a Bf 109 near Ostend on 28 May. Another Bf 109 was shot down by McKnight, this time to the north of Dunkirk, the next day, as well shooting down a Dornier Do 17 medium bomber about 9 miles (14 km) to the east of Dunkirk. A second Bf 109 claimed as destroyed was unable to be confirmed. On 31 May, McKnight shot down a pair of Messerschmitt Bf 110 heavy fighters as well as a Bf 109, all in the vicinity of Dunkirk. The next day, he destroyed two Junkers Ju 87 dive bombers; McKnight's claims for two more destroyed Ju 87s were not confirmed.

No. 242 Squadron was sent to France on 8 June to reinforce the RAF units still supporting the remnants of the BEF still there. The pace of operations was hectic, as the squadron and its personnel relocated several times as the BEF retreated towards the Atlantic coast. At times the squadron's pilots were having to service their own aircraft. McKnight destroyed two Bf 109s to the south of Champagne on 14 June. The same day, he was awarded the Distinguished Flying Cross (DFC) for which the published citation read:

One day in May, 1940, this officer destroyed a Messerschmitt 109 and on the following day, whilst on patrol with his squadron, he shot down three more enemy aircraft. The destruction of the last one of the three aircraft occasioned a long chase over enemy territory. On his return flight he used his remaining ammunition, and caused many casualties, in a low flying attack on a railway along which the enemy was bringing up heavy guns. Pilot Officer McKnight has shown exceptional skill and courage as a fighter pilot.

— London Gazette, No. 34873, 14 June 1940

No. 242 Squadron, after being involved in the cover for the evacuation of British troops from Le Havre, withdrew to the United Kingdom on 18 June. The constant combat had been telling on McKnight and, exhausted and underweight, he was admitted to hospital in early July to recuperate.

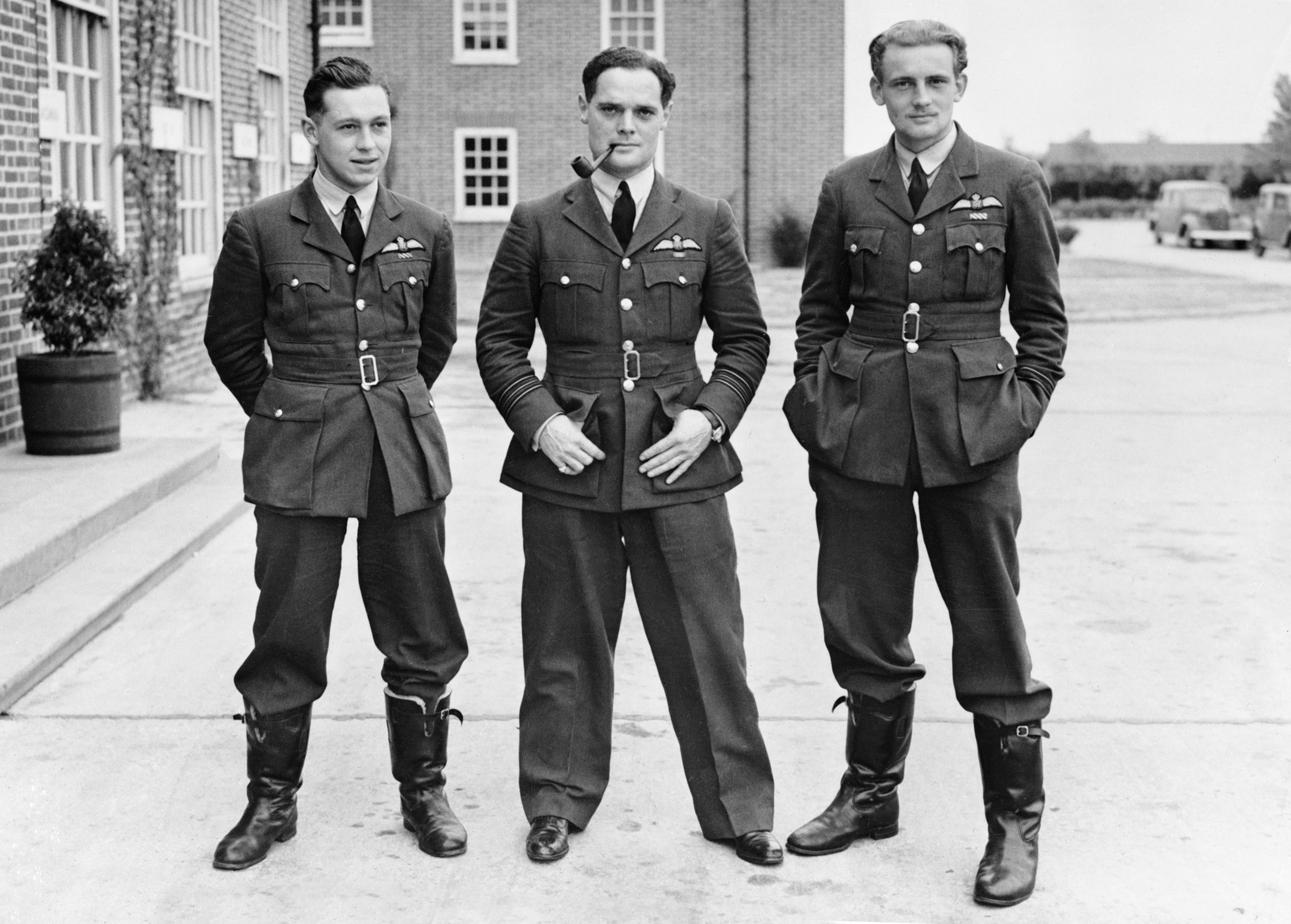
McKnight stands on the left, next to the commander of No. 242 Squadron, Douglas Bader at Duxford, September 1940

=== Battle of Britain ===
No. 242 Squadron had lost several pilots, including its commander, during the course of its service in France and reassembled at Coltishall. Squadron Leader Douglas Bader was appointed its new commander on 24 June and tasked with restoring morale and discipline. He worked to bring it back up to strength, both in personnel and equipment, and undertook a training program. He soon had the respect of the pilots of command. By 10 July the squadron was operational and carrying out convoy patrols.

Throughout July and August although the Battle of Britain had raged over southern England, the industrial Midlands which the squadron patrolled did not receive heavy attacks. On 30 August, by which time McKnight had recovered his health, the squadron relocated to Duxford and was immediately involved in action when a large formation of Heinkel He 111 medium bombers with Bf 109 and Messerschmitt Bf 110 fighter escorts was intercepted on a raid against North Weald. McKnight, flying as wing man to Bader, destroyed two Bf 110s and a He 111. On 9 September, McKnight, again flying as Bader's wing man, destroyed a pair of Bf 110s when Luftwaffe raiders were intercepted by a group of three squadrons that were coordinated into a single unit by Bader as part of his "Big Wing" plan. While trying to split the escorting fighters from the bombers, McKnight's Hurricane was hit and one aileron was shot away.

McKnight made two more claims on 18 September, shooting down a Do 17 over the Thames Estuary and sharing in the destruction of a Junkers Ju 88 medium bomber. McKnight was promoted to flying officer the next day. He was awarded a Bar to his DFC in October. The citation, published in The London Gazette, read:

This officer has destroyed six enemy aircraft during the last thirteen weeks. He has proved himself to be a most efficient section leader, and has consistently given proof that he is a courageous and tenacious fighter.

— London Gazette, No. 34964, 8 October 1940

By this time the Luftwaffe was decreasing its operations over England and No. 242 Squadron started carrying out night fighter patrols from Duxford although these were unsuccessful. However, it was still involved in day fighter operations and on one of these, a sortie over the Thames Estuary and out to the North Sea on 5 November, McKnight, along with Flying Officer Leonard Haines of No. 19 Squadron, disabled a Bf 109; the pilot, Edward Scheidt of Jagdgeschwader 26 (Fighter Wing 26), bailed out over the Thames and his aircraft crashed near Birchington.

== Circus offensive ==
No. 242 Squadron returned to Coltishall in late November, followed by a further move to Martlesham Heath the following month. In early 1941, the squadron began carrying out offensive operations to German-occupied France as part of the RAF's Circus offensive. The squadron's first sortie of this type, involving two aircraft and known as a "Mosquito" raid, was made on 9 January 1941.

On 12 January, McKnight, paired with Pilot Officer M. Brown, made his first Mosquito sortie to Gravelines. They strafed German shipping and, just inland of Gravelines, German troops were spotted and these too were attacked. The pair then were intercepted by several Bf 109s. While Brown safely returned to Martlesham Heath, McKnight was never seen again and was most likely shot down, either by a Bf 109 or by anti-aircraft fire. Fellow No. 242 Squadron pilot and flying ace John Latta made his own Mosquito sortie later in the day and was also killed. His loss, and that of McKnight, which was widely reported in Calgary, had a significant impact on the squadron.

McKnight's body was never recovered so he has no known grave; his name is inscribed on the Runnymede Memorial, Englefield Green, Egham, Surrey, United Kingdom. McKnight is credited with having destroyed nineteen aircraft, two shared with other pilots. Claims for another three destroyed aircraft are unconfirmed. Calgary's McKnight Boulevard, near the city's airport, is named after him.
