= Glorious Oxenham =

New Zealand teacher and cultural advocate

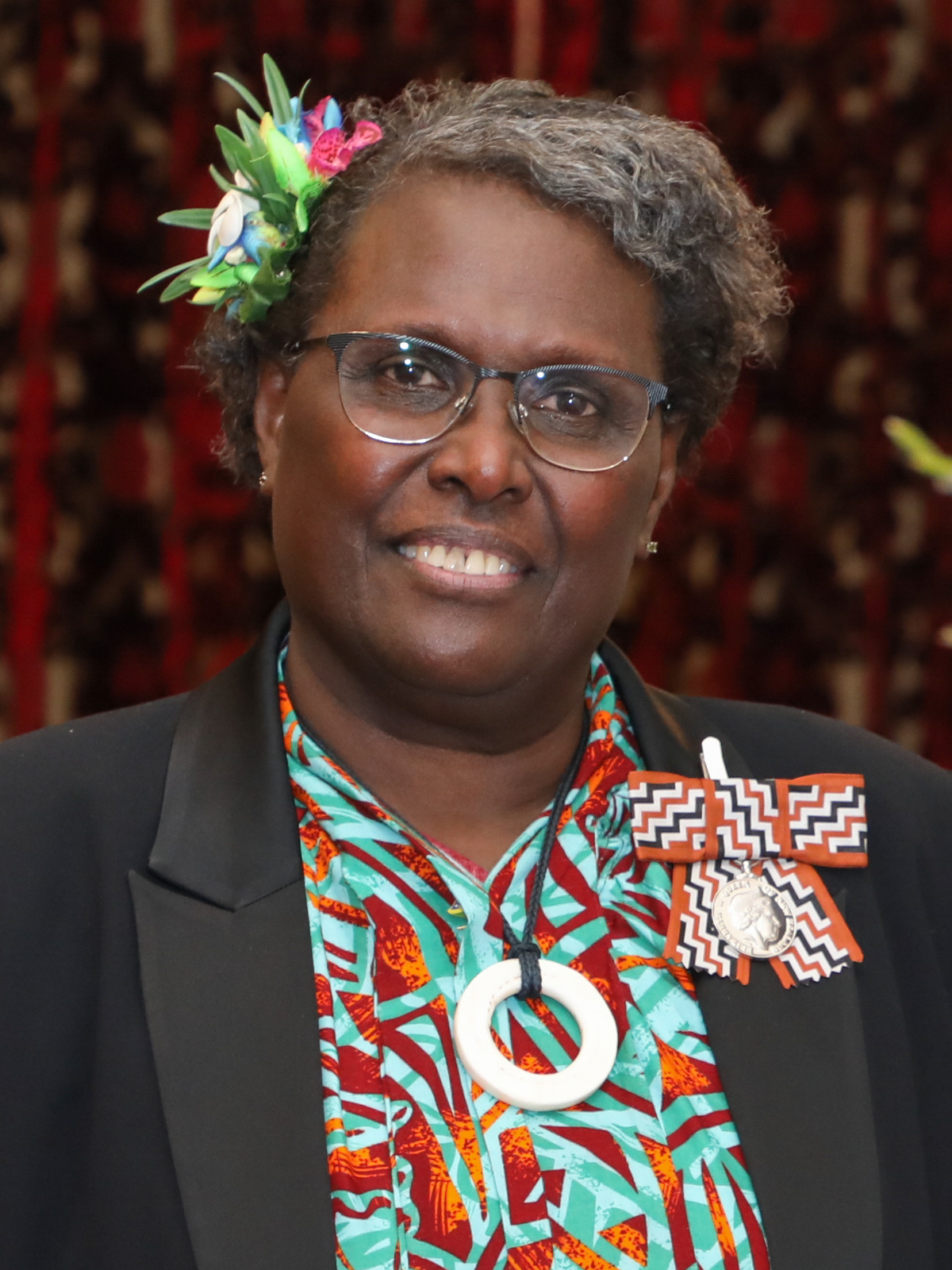
Oxenham in 2022

Glorious Marie Oxenham QSM, nicknamed Glo Oxenham and Aunty Glo, is a Solomon Islands-born New Zealand teacher and cultural advocate. She has promoted Melanesian and Solomon Islands culture and languages in New Zealand for more than 25 years. In addition to her community activism, Oxenham has consulted with New Zealand's diplomatic staff, defence personnel, and police on cultural and political affairs prior to their deployment to the Solomon Islands for peacekeeping missions. For her work, Oxenham was awarded the Queen's Service Medal in December 2021.

== Biography ==
Oxenham was born and raised in the Solomon Islands. She married her husband, a New Zealander working with Volunteer Service Abroad in the Solomons, and moved to New Zealand with him around 1980. Oxenham, who resides in Lower Hutt, has two children. She is a pre-school teacher by profession and teaches at a school in Taitā.

Oxenham, who speaks fluent Solomons Pidgin, has spent more than 25 years promoting the Melanesian and Solomon Islander communities and culture in New Zealand. Much of her work has focused on the Melanesian community around the capital, Wellington. She has said:

Here in Wellington we work really well with the three Melanesian countries, Solomon Islands, Papua New Guinea and Vanuatu...These three communities work really well together as soulfully as well as helping each other out in the community things that we do.

Oxenham has headed the Wellington Solomon Islands Community Group for three tenures. Since 2011, she has served as the president of the Lower North Island Wantok Association, where she has spearheaded fundraising and community events. Oxenham also works with Solomon Islander and other Melanesian students studying in Wellington.

Oxenham has also helped to establish the Wellington Melanesia Women and Friends Group, which works with Melanesian women in the region. She explained to Stuff that "a lot of the women tend to be shy and not put themselves forward and we encourage them to speak up".

Her other projects include "Woven Bags of Melanesia", a project with the Pātaka Art + Museum, in which flax from New Zealand was woven into bags and other cultural objects for an exhibition.

In the 2022 New Year Honours, Oxenham was awarded the Queen's Service Medal, for services to the Melanesian community in New Zealand.
