= Solomon Islander New Zealanders =

Solomon Islander people living in New Zealand

Solomon Islander Zealanders
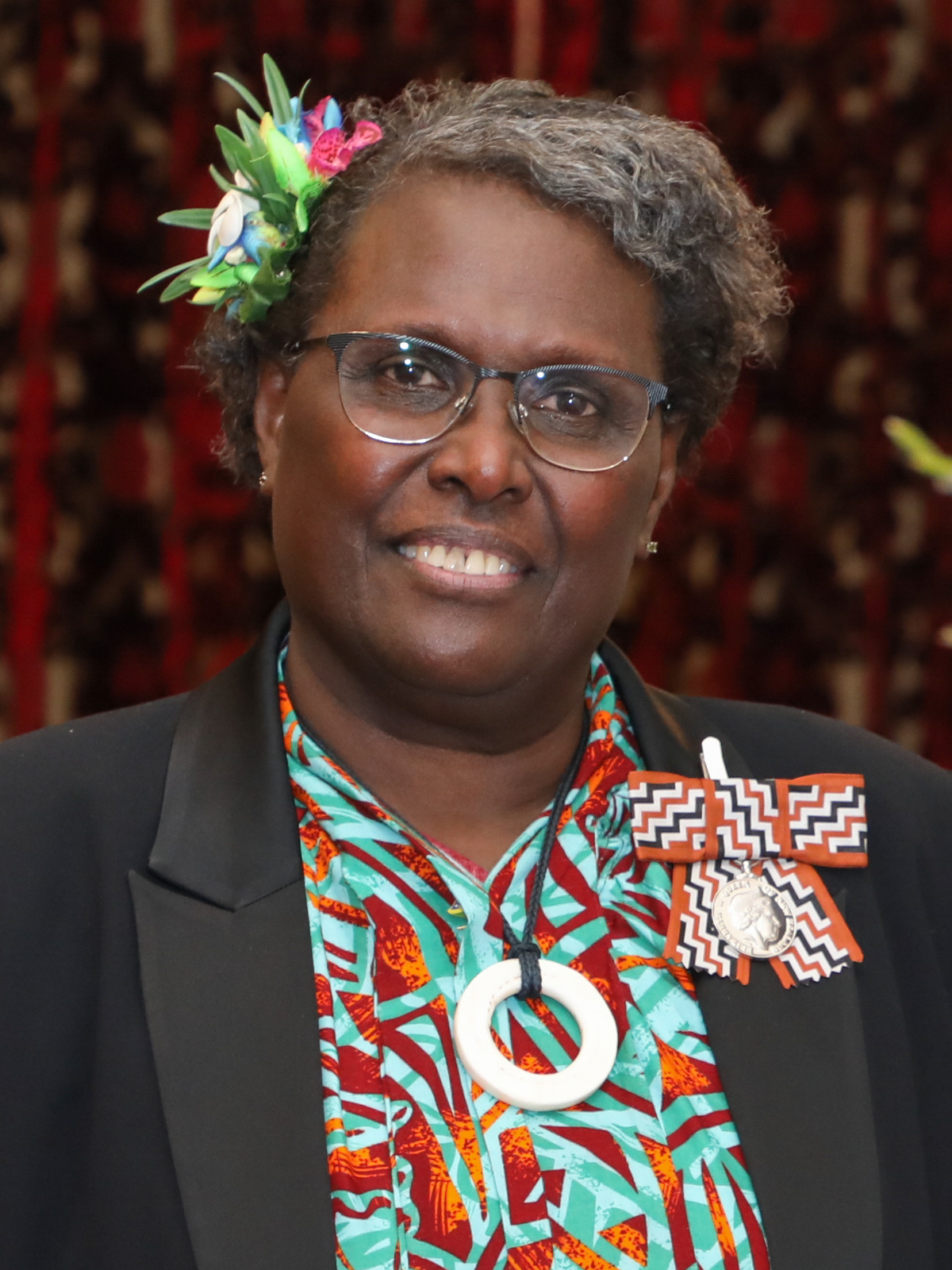
- Glorious Oxenham, a famous Solomon Islander Zealander

Total population
- 924 (2023 census)

Regions with significant populations
- Auckland, Wellington

Languages
- English

The Solomon Islander New Zealander community consists of 924 Solomon Islander ethnic people living in New Zealand. About 60% of them were born overseas (mainly Solomon Islands) and nearly 40% born in New Zealand. They form a subset of Pasifika New Zealanders.

== Demographics ==
According to the 2006 Census, there were 435 Solomon Islanders in New Zealand, which has grown to 600 Solomon Islanders in 2013 and 777 Solomon Islanders in 2018. According to other estimates, there are approximately 2000 Solomon Islands people living in NZ, with an extra 1000 who are part of the Recognised Seasonal Employer (RSE) programme.

=== Language ===
About 93.8% of Solomon Islander New Zealanders are English speakers. The Solomon Islands Auckland Wantok Association (SIAWA) is involved in teaching and promoting Pidjin language in New Zealand. The first week of July is celebrated as the Solomon Islander Language week by the New Zealand government.

=== Religion ===
Most Solomon Islander New Zealanders are Christian (67.2%), with a significant proportion (21.4%) of the rest choosing "no religion" in the census.

== Famous People with Full/Partial Solomon Islander Ancestry ==
- Glorious Oxenham – was awarded the Queen's Service Medal in 2021, for services to the Melanesian community in New Zealand
- Frank-Paul Nu'uausala – New Zealand Rugby League Player
- Dominique Peyroux – New Zealand Rugby League Player
