= No. 242 Squadron RAF =

Defunct flying squadron of the Royal Air Force

No. 242 (Canadian) Squadron RAF
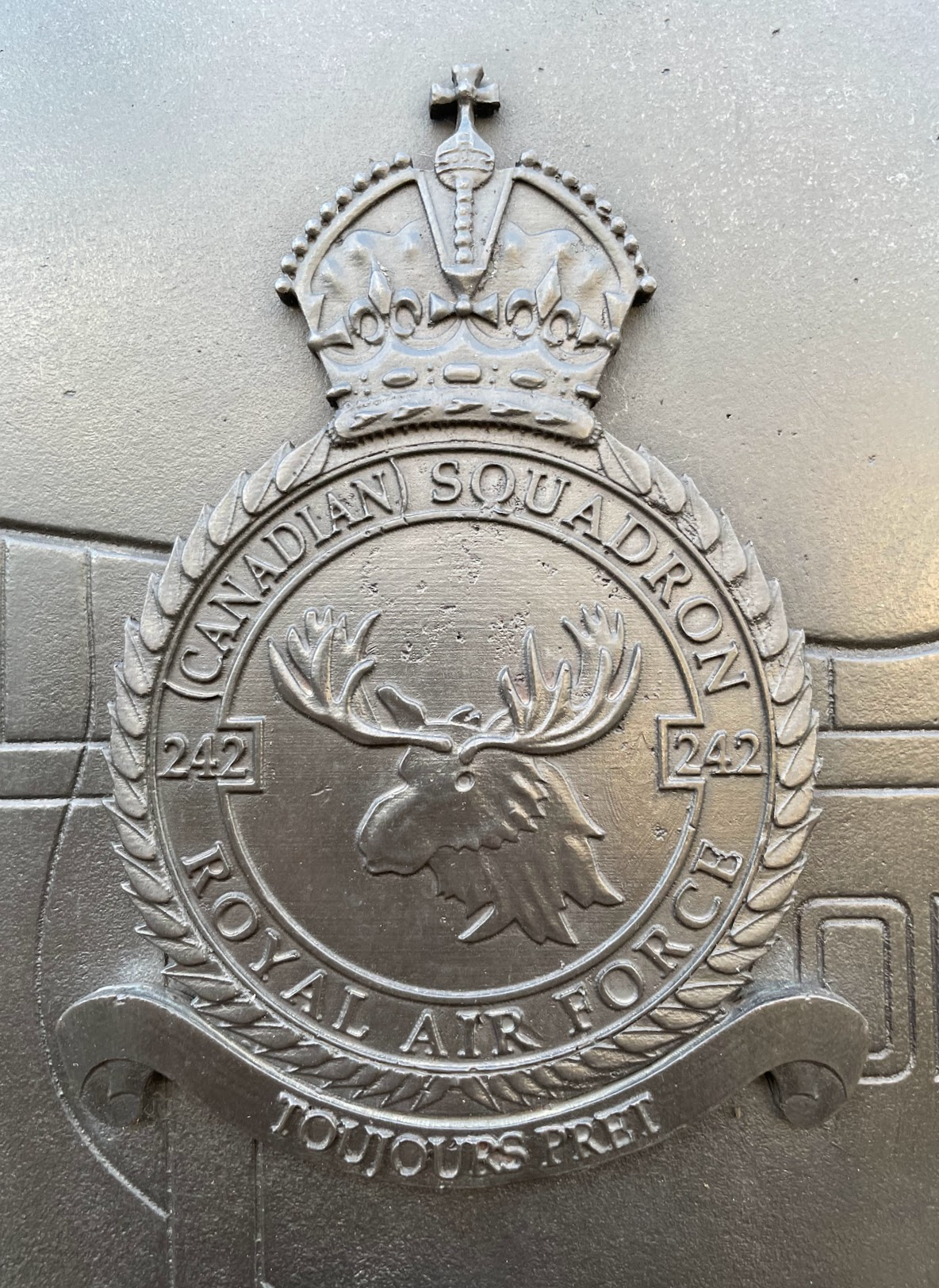
- The heraldic badge of the squadron as it appears on the Battle of Britain Monument in London
- Active: 15 Aug 1918 – 15 May 1919; 30 Oct 1939 – 10 Mar 1942; 10 Apr 1942 – 4 Nov 1944; 15 Nov 1944 – 1 May 1950; 1 Oct 1959 – 30 Sep 1964
- Country: United Kingdom
- Branch: Royal Air Force
- Nickname: Canadian
- Mottos: French: Toujours prêt ("Always ready")
- Engagements: Battle of Britain, Invasion of Sicily, Berlin Airlift

Commanders
- Notable commanders: Douglas Bader; Alan Eckford

Insignia
- Squadron Badge heraldry: A moose's head erased At the time that the badge was awarded, many of the air crew serving with the squadron were Canadian.
- Squadron Codes: LE (Feb 1940 – Dec 1941, Apr 1942 – Nov 1944); KY (Nov 1944 – 1948)

No. 242 Squadron RAF was a Royal Air Force (RAF) squadron. It flew in many roles during the First World War, Second World War and Cold War.

During the Second World War, the squadron was notable for (firstly) having many pilots who were either Royal Canadian Air Force (RCAF) personnel or Canadians serving in the RAF – to the extent that it was sometimes known, unofficially, as "242 Canadian Squadron" – and (secondly) for being the first squadron to be commanded by Douglas Bader.

== History ==
=== In World War I ===
No. 242 Squadron was formed on 15 August 1918 from the numbers 408, 409 and 514 Seaplane Flights at Newhaven Seaplane Base, and continued using the Short 184 from there and the nearby airfield at Telscombe Cliffs on anti-submarine patrols over the English Channel until the end of the First World War.

=== In World War II ===
The squadron was reformed at RAF Church Fenton on 30 October 1939 with Canadian personnel. At first using the Bristol Blenheim and Fairey Battle light bombers, it converted to the Hawker Hurricane fighter in February 1940.

==== Battle for France ====
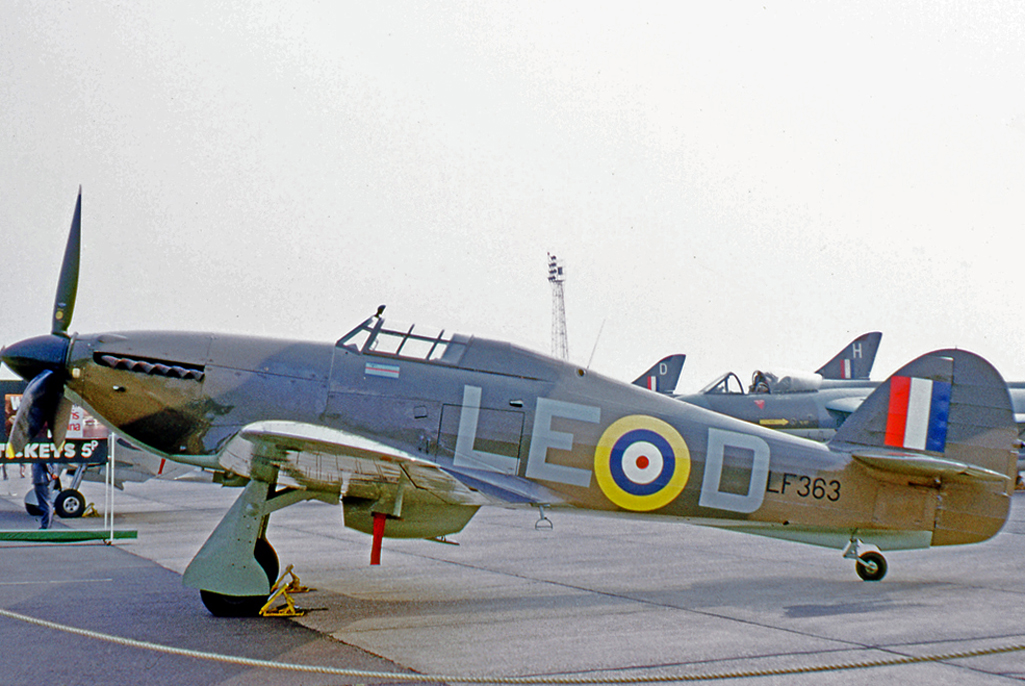
Hawker Hurricane IIC wearing the 'LE' code of 242 Squadron

In May 1940 the squadron moved to RAF Coltishall. Douglas Bader was posted to command the Squadron, as a squadron leader, at the end of June 1940, when the unit was mainly made up of Canadian pilots that had suffered high losses in the Battle of France and had low morale. Despite initial resistance to their new commanding officer, the pilots (including such aces as Willie McKnight) were soon won over by Bader's strong personality and perseverance, especially in cutting through red tape to make the squadron operational again. Aircraft spares and tools had been in very short supply and not available through the usual channels. After appeals to higher authority, ample amounts of aircraft spares and tools were provided. Upon the formation of No. 12 Group RAF, No. 242 Squadron was assigned to the Group while based at RAF Duxford.

==== Battle of Britain ====
In June 1940 it moved to RAF Coltishall in eastern England, as part of No. 12 Group RAF and was involved in the Battle of Britain. During this period 242 Squadron moved to RAF Duxford as part of the Duxford Wing, 12 Group's Big Wing formation. In 1941 it started offensive sweeps and bomber escorts and convoy patrols.

==== Dispersed at Java ====
In December 1941 the squadron moved to the Far East arriving at RAF Seletar on 13 January 1942. The situation was desperate and it had to move to Palembang on Sumatra where it was combined with the remnants of No. 232 Squadron. Despite this, the squadron collapsed through lack of spares and was dispersed by 10 March 1942. Its final commander in the Far East was Squadron Leader Ivon Julian.

==== Reformed on Spitfires ====
On 10 April 1942 the squadron re-formed at RAF Turnhouse, Scotland with the Supermarine Spitfire and was involved in coastal patrols. In October it was deployed to North Africa defending Algiers. It fought into Tunisia then moved on to Malta and was involved in the invasion of Sicily and the Salerno beach-head operations. In 1944 it was moved to Syria for a rest period before moving to Corsica where it was part of the invasion of southern France and attacks on northern Italy. The squadron was disbanded in Italy on 4 November 1944.

=== In Transport Command ===
The squadron reformed again on 15 November 1944 at RAF Stoney Cross as a transport squadron, training on the Vickers Wellington then getting operational on the Short Stirling. By 1946 it was operating the Avro York running scheduled freight services into India and to the Azores; in June 1946 it was located at RAF Oakington as part of No. 47 Group. In 1948 it became involved in the Berlin Air Lift operating from Wunstorf. After the air lift it returned to England and reequipped with Handley Page Hastings. The squadron was disbanded at RAF Lyneham on 1 May 1950.

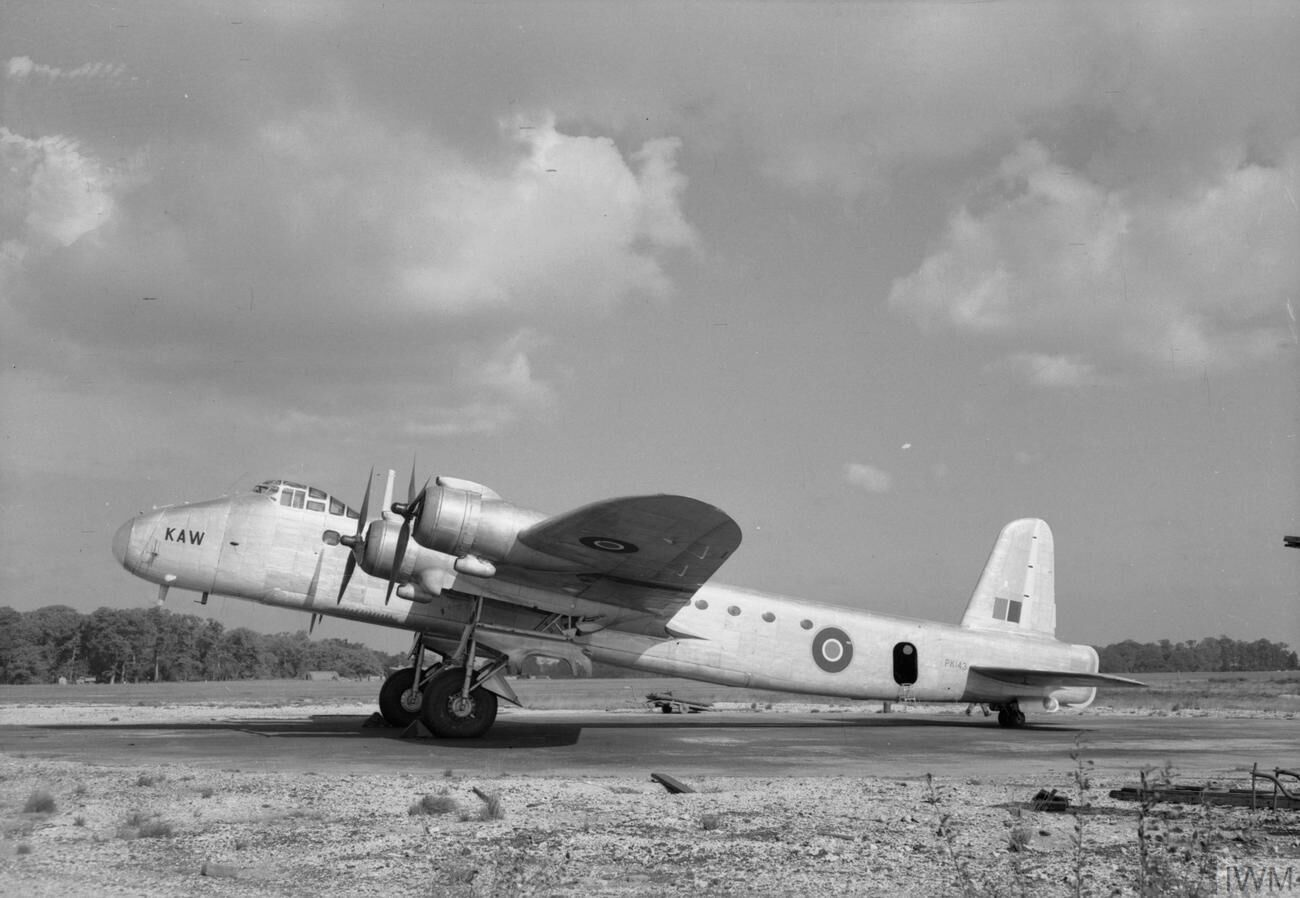
A Short Stirling C Mark V of No. 242 Squadron at Stoney Cross, Hampshire

=== On missiles ===
On 1 October 1959 it was reformed at RAF Marham as a surface-to-air missile unit with the Bristol Bloodhound. It was tasked to protect the V bomber bases until disbanded on 30 September 1964.

== Aircraft operated ==
Aircraft operated by No. 242 Squadron RAF
| From | To | Aircraft | Version |
|---|---|---|---|
| Aug 1918 | May 1919 | Short 184 | |
| Aug 1918 | Jan 1919 | Airco DH.6 | |
| Oct 1918 | Nov 1918 | Fairey Campania | |
| Dec 1939 | Dec 1939 | Bristol Blenheim | Mk.If |
| Dec 1939 | Feb 1940 | Fairey Battle | Mk.I |
| Jan 1940 | Feb 1941 | Hawker Hurricane | Mk.I |
| Feb 1941 | Feb 1942 | Hawker Hurricane | Mk.IIb |
| Apr 1942 | Dec 1943 | Supermarine Spitfire | Mk.Vb |
| Jul 1943 | Feb 1944 | Supermarine Spitfire | Mk.Vc |
| Jun 1943 | Oct 1944 | Supermarine Spitfire | Mk.IX |
| Jan 1945 | Feb 1945 | Vickers Wellington | Mk.XVI |
| Feb 1945 | Jan 1946 | Short Stirling | Mk.V |
| Apr 1945 | Sep 1945 | Avro York | C.1 |
| Sep 1945 | Dec 1945 | Short Stirling | Mk.IV |
| Dec 1945 | Sep 1949 | Avro York | C.1 |
| Sep 1949 | May 1950 | Handley Page Hastings | C.1 |
| Oct 1959 | Sep 1964 | Bristol Bloodhound | Mk.I |
