= Billy T. James =

New Zealand entertainer, comedian, musician and actor

Billy T. James MBE
- Born: William James Te Wehi Taitoko; 17 January 1948; Cambridge, New Zealand
- Died: 7 August 1991 (aged 43); Auckland, New Zealand
- Resting place: Mount Taupiri
- Occupations: Comedian; Actor; Writer; Musician

William James Te Wehi Taitoko MBE (17 January 1948 – 7 August 1991), better known by his stage name Billy T. James, was a New Zealand entertainer, comedian, musician and actor. He became a key figure in the development of New Zealand comedy and was a household name during his lifetime.

== Early life ==
Billy grew up as William James Te Wehi Taitoko, first in the Waikato town of Leamington (now part of Cambridge), then in Whangārei. At high school, he sang and played guitar in a band. Popular for drawing caricatures of his teachers, Billy began an apprenticeship as a signwriter after leaving school.

In his mid 20s, Billy T. was invited to join showband the Māori Volcanics, and was soon performing around the world, echoing the path of entertainers John Rowles and Frankie Stevens. He quickly showed his skills as impressionist, comedian, guitarist and saxophone-player. While living in Australia Billy went solo, dropping his Taitoko surname, and rearranging his birth names to "something the Aussies could pronounce".

Taitoko was of Waikato Tainui and Clan Campbell descent.

== Career ==
Taitoko joined the Maori Volcanics Showband in the 1970s and performed around the world. Prince Tui Teka encouraged him to embark on a solo career which saw him in great demand for his skits and impressions and his cabaret singing. He adopted the stage name Billy T. James because "it was something the Australians could pronounce".

In 1980, he appeared on the variety show Radio Times, the success of which led to his own comedy sketch show in 1981 called The Billy T James Show. The same year he was named New Zealand Entertainer of the Year.

In 1985, his cabaret act was recorded live and released on LP as Billy T Live! at Pips Cabaret, Whangarei. Featuring standup comedy selections and live versions of songs such as "Running Bear" and "When A Child Is Born", this title was out-of-print for more than a decade before being re-released in CD format in 2008.

Taitoko made a notable appearance in the 1985 feature film Came a Hot Friday and provided voice talent for the popular animated film Footrot Flats: The Dog's Tail. Also in 1985, James was named New Zealand Entertainer of the Decade.

In the 1986 New Year Honours, James was appointed a Member of the Order of the British Empire, for services to entertainment.

In 1986, James and Chris Slane published Real Hard Case which contained comic-strip interpretations of Taitoko's comedy. Real Hard Case 2 followed in 1987.

During this period, Taitoko name and likeness were used for the company "Billy T's Hangi Takeaways," with locations in Auckland, but the business did not last and closed after several years.

In 1990, Taitoko received the prestigious Benny Award from the Variety Artists Club of New Zealand Inc for a lifetime of excellence in the performing arts. That year, he was also awarded the New Zealand 1990 Commemoration Medal.

== The Billy T James Show ==
Billy T. James' self-titled television show for TVNZ featured sketch comedy and live performances of standup comedy and songs. The show lasted seven series and became a New Zealand institution. Joining Taitoko in the first series were regulars Doug Aston and Laurie Dee. Almost all of the first (1981) and second series (1982) are lost; only one episode from the first two series still exists in the TVNZ archive. The second series saw James introduce his first recurring character Pierre the Painter who would paint pictures while telling a story. The third series, the first to survive in full, saw the introduction of a parody of the Maori news show Te Karere entitled "Te News" in Episode 3, however, this would not appear again until two years later during Series 5. The black singlet and yellow towel James wore in these sketches were to become iconic. After the 1984 series, Doug Aston and Laurie Dee, along with many of the writers, were dropped. The fifth and sixth series (1985 and 1986) were co-written by Peter Rowley and included parodies of Miami Vice, Playschool, a 'Lands For Bags' television commercial, and sketches featuring Rowley as Captain Cook.

Series 1 and 2 most likely ran for 6 half-hour episodes each in 1981 and 1982. Series 3 ran for 7 half-hour episodes in 1983, and Series 4 ran for 6 half-hour episodes in 1984.

Later, Taitoko starred in a second television show, also titled The Billy T James Show. It screened on TV3 in 1990 and was based on a format devised by James and Tom Parkinson. Abandoning the popular sketch comedy format, this show was a family sitcom format and starred James as himself. Co-starring were Ilona Rodgers and Mark Hadlow, with Mark Wright, Tania Wehi, and Willa O'Neill. It ran for one series with only average audience ratings and reviews.

== Deteriorating health, transplant and death ==
In 1988, Taitoko suffered a major heart attack and underwent a quadruple bypass operation. The operation was not successful, and in November 1989 he received a heart transplant, one of the first to be performed in New Zealand. He returned to the stage of the Aotea Centre in April 1990 for the variety special Billy T James, Alive and Gigging. Howard Morrison appeared as a special guest.

Taitoko's health deteriorated again shortly afterwards, and he became ill with heart failure in February 1991. He died at Green Lane Hospital in Auckland on 7 August 1991.

Billy is survived by his daughter Cherie James, an actress and presenter of the 1997 documentary A Daughter's Story, about her father.

== Legacy, recent biographies and documentaries ==
The Billy T Award was founded in 1997 in honour of James, recognising comedians with outstanding potential. Winners are presented with a yellow towel, Billy's trademark from his "Te News" sketches.

In 2009, nearly 50% of respondents voted him the country's greatest comedian in a New Zealand Listener survey, eighteen years after his death.

The first biography of James was released in 2009. Entitled The Life and Times of Billy T. James, it was written by Matt Elliott and was based upon interviews with more than fifty friends and colleagues of Billy as well as his wife Lynn and sister Ngaire.

In December 2010, funding was given for the production of a biographical film based on Billy T. James' life. In March 2011, it was revealed the film was to be titled Billy, and would star Tainui Tukiwaho as James and Morgana O'Reilly as wife Lynn. The film premiered on 21 August 2011 on TV One. Liberties were taken for dramatic purposes, including arguments with co-writer and television partner Peter Rowley and a minor heart attack while filming, neither of which occurred. Both Peter Rowley and James' daughter criticised the inaccuracies of the production in the press.

A documentary entitled Billy T: Te Movie was released theatrically in August 2011. Directed by Ian Mune, it proved popular with both theatre-goers and reviewers, becoming the week's top box office performer on the week of release with $263,000 in sales. Te Movie is now available on DVD.

In 2011, Peter Rowley wrote and starred in Billy T & Me, a one-man show which combined Rowley's memories of working alongside James with archival video footage. The show toured New Zealand and was made available on DVD.

In late 2021 James' family listed many of his personal belongings on auction site TradeMe. Included were his personal scrapbooks, musical instruments and the awards presented to him during his career. The auctions received much interest and coverage in the New Zealand media.

== Discography ==
=== Albums ===
Year	Title	Details	Peak chart positions	Certifications
Year	Title	Details	NZ	Certifications
1981	Selections	Label: Starcall	23	
1985	Live at Pips	Released: 1 June 1985; Label: Pagan Records	33	
1997	The Comic Genius of Billy T James		1	NZ: 4× Platinum
2010	The Entertainer – The Best Of Billy T. James	Released: 1 August 2010; Label: Viscount Productions	—	
2011	Gypsy Girl (A Musical Story As Told By Billy T. James)	Released: 25 September 2011; Label: Viscount Productions	—	
2011	Billy T: Te Soundtrack		7	
"—" denotes a recording that did not chart or was not released in that territory.

== See also ==
- Billy T Award
- New Zealand humour
- List of New Zealand television personalities
