= Eteuati Ete =

New Zealand actor

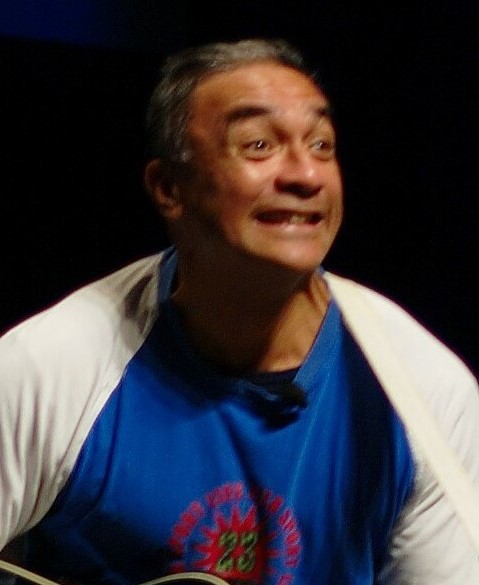
- Ete in 2010
- Born: Samoa
- Occupation(s): Actor, Comedian

Etuate Ete (born ~1962) is a New Zealand-based actor and comedian best known as one half of the Samoan duo Laughing Samoans.

== Biography ==
Ete was born in Samoa and moved to New Zealand with his parents at the age of 12. He was one of the first Pacific Islanders to attend the Toi Whakaari New Zealand Drama School, graduating in 1984 with a Diploma in Acting.

In 1981, Ete became one of the founding members of New Zealand's first Pacific Island theatre group, Taotahi. They staged the first full-length Pacific Island play ever performed in New Zealand called “Le Matau” (1984) in which Ete played the lead role for which he was named by The Dominion's theatre critics as the most promising male performer of the year. He wrote and performed the first solo show by a Pacific Islander in New Zealand called The Johnny Smith Myth and has extensive stage, film, television and radio experience. In 2003, he formed the Laughing Samoans with Tofiga Fepulea'i.

In 2017, Ete confessed to a history of domestic violence.

In 2019, he won the Senior Pacific Artist award in the annual Creative New Zealand Arts Pasifika Awards. Creative New Zealand said of Ete receiving the award, "He has used his public profile and experience to make a positive impact in as many ways possible. Eteuati has also been bestowed the Samoan matai title of Maiava by his family."
