= Tofiga Fepuleaʻi =

New Zealand actor and comedian

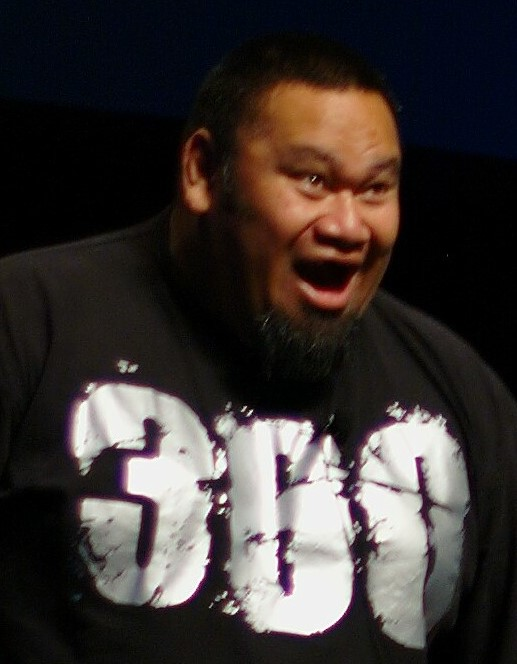
- Fepuleaʻi in 2010
- Born: Tofiga Fepuleaʻi; 5 February 1974 (age 52); Wellington, New Zealand
- Education: Rongotai College
- Occupations: Actor, comedian

Tofiga Fepuleaʻi (Samoan pronunciation: [tɔf ˈɪŋa . fɛpʊlɛˈaʔɪ], tor-FING-uh FEH-puu-leh-AH-ih; born 5 February 1974) is a New Zealand actor and comedian best known as a member of the stand-up comedy duo Laughing Samoans.

== Biography ==
Fepuleaʻi was born and grew up in Wellington, New Zealand. His mother is Fuamago Malae Malagamaaliʻi Fepuleaʻi from Papa Sataua, Falealupo, Sagone and Fasitoʻouta and his father is Tuʻua Semurana Fepuleaʻi from Fusi Safotulafai and Saleʻaula, Savaiʻi.

He was educated at Rongotai College.

Fepuleaʻi's first stand-up comedy show was called Laughing with Samoans. First performed at the New Zealand Fringe Festival in Wellington in 2003, it changed name and became a duo performed with Eteuati Ete called the Laughing Samoans. Fepuleaʻi and Ete have toured this show around New Zealand, places in the Pacific, Australia and North America. Title of their shows include Laughing with Samoans (2003), A Small Samoan Wedding (2005), Off Work (2007), and Choka Block (2011) with DVD's produced too. In 2010, they made a television series The Laughing Samoans at Large. The Laughing Samoans disbanded in 2016.

Among the characters Fepuleaʻi and Ete perform in the Laughing Samoans are two women, Aunty Tala and her niece, Fai. Scholar Sarina Pearson says of these characters, "Whether Fepuleaʻi and Ete are enacting a relatively straightforward parody of women or performing yet another layer of gender inversion by parodying Faʻafafine is ambiguous."

In April 2017, Fepuleaʻi premiered his first solo show called I Gan't Belive It in Auckland, with presentations in Wellington and Samoa.

The first acting role for Fepuleaʻi in a feature film was in 2020 in the film Take Home Pay.

In 2021, his show Sorry bout it was part of the New Zealand Comedy Festival national tour and features James Nokise as the opening act.

Fepuleaʻi was a youth worker for 12 years and he has a company 3Sons that hold school holiday programmes for Pasifika boys called o aʻu lea (this is me) about wellbeing and identity.

Alongside Inangaro Vakaafi, Fepuleaʻi has been co-hosting a mid-morning radio show called Island Time on Radio 531pi (Pacific Media).

He appeared as a contestant on season 5 of Taskmaster New Zealand. He was ill for the show's studio segments, so his position was filled in by previous contestants Madeleine Sami, Matt Heath, Josh Thomson, Bubbah and Chris Parker.

He provided the voice of Nalo in Moana 2.

In 2025 he was presented the Reilly Comedy Award from the Variety Artists Club of New Zealand.
