= Laughing Samoans =

New Zealand based comedy duo

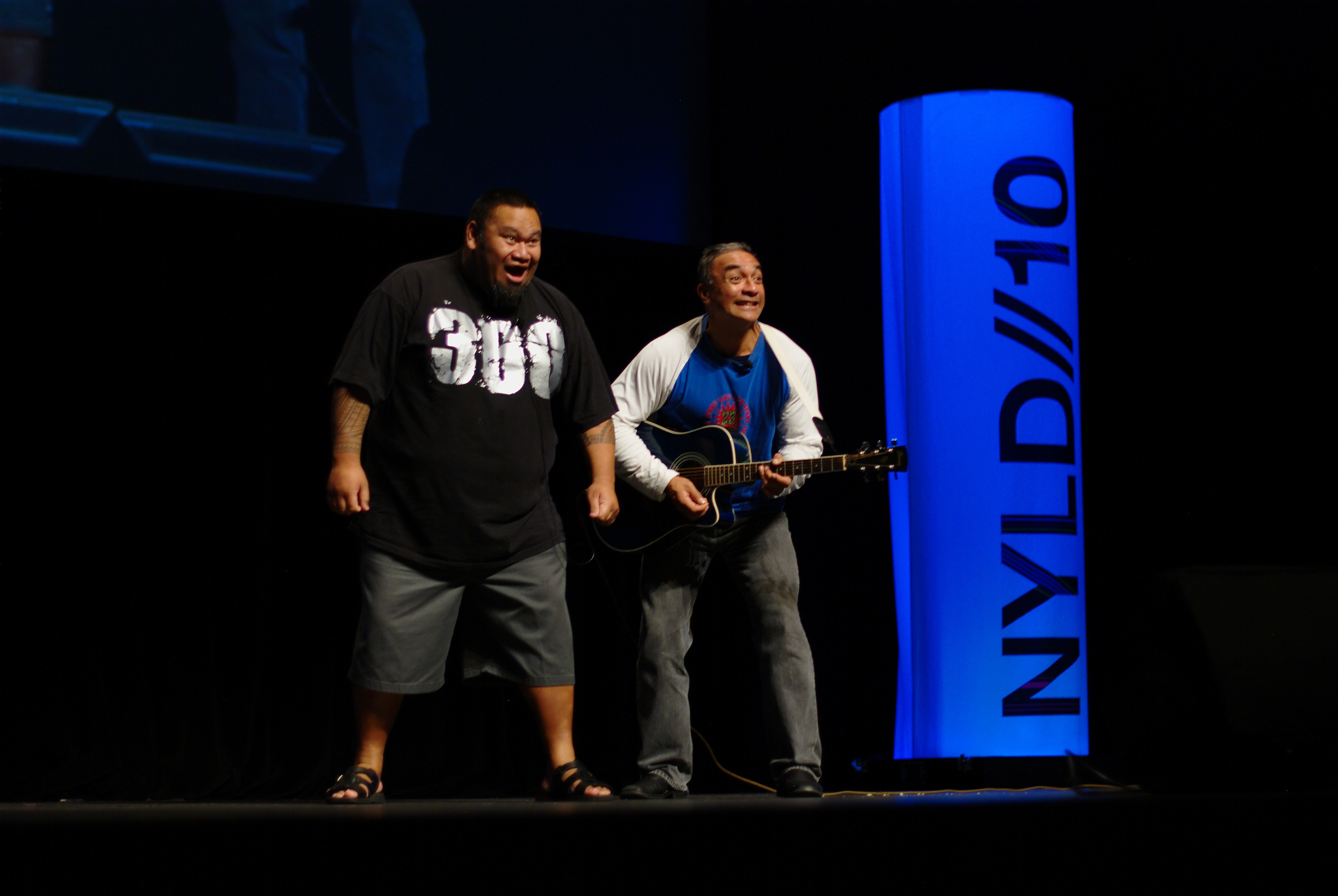
- The Laughing Samoans on stage during National Young Leaders Day 2010 in Wellington, New Zealand.

Comedy career
- Years active: 2004–2016
- Medium: Theatre
- Genre: Comedy
- Members: Eteuati Ete; Tofiga Fepulea'i
- Website: www.laughingsamoans.com (via The Wayback Machine)

The Laughing Samoans were a New Zealand-based duo formed by comedians Eteuati Ete and Tofiga Fepulea'i, both of Samoan descent. The duo have toured in New Zealand in sold-out shows and internationally to Australia, United States, the Cook Islands, Hawai'i, Fiji and England in 2009.

Their first show as a duo was called A Small Samoan Wedding, and toured around New Zealand in 2004 before traveling overseas. Since then, they have toured with a new show almost every year:

- Laughing with Samoans (2003)
- A Small Samoan Wedding (2004)
- Old School (2005)
- Off Work (2006)
- Crack Me Off (2008)
- Prettyful Woman (2009)
- Choka-Block (2010)
- Greatest Hits (2011)
- Funny Chokers (2012)
- Fobulous (2013)
- Fresh Off da Blane (2014)
- Fink About It (2015)
- Island Time! (2016)

== Ending ==
On 5 December 2016, Ete posted on their website and Facebook page that the Laughing Samoans would not be producing another touring show for the foreseeable future.
