= Iosefa =

Iosefa is a Samoan name. It may refer to the following people:

Given name

- Iosefa Enari (1954–2000), New Zealand opera singer
  - Iosefa Enari Memorial Award
- Joe Tekori (Joseph Iosefa Tekori; born 1983), Samoan rugby union player

Surname

- Joey Iosefa (born 1991), American football fullback
- Masada Iosefa (1988–2021), Samoan rugby league player
- Telupe Iosefa (born 1986), Tuvaluan powerlifter
- Fofō Iosefa Fiti Sunia (born 1937), Samoan politician

== See also ==
- Josepha
- Josefa (given name)
