= Josefa (given name) =

Josefa is a given name. It can be both feminine and masculine. Notable people with the name include:

- Infanta Francisca Josefa of Portugal (1699–1736), last of eight children of King Peter II of Portugal and his second wife Marie Sophie of Neuburg
- Infanta Josefa Fernanda of Spain (1827–1910), daughter of Infante Francisco de Paula and his first wife, Princess Luisa Carlotta of the Two Sicilies
- Infanta Maria Josefa of Spain (1744–1801), Princess of Naples and Sicily
- Josefa Acevedo de Gomez (1803–1861), Colombian novelist
- Josefa Bayeu (18th century), wife of Francisco Goya
- Josefa Berens-Totenohl (1891–1969), German writer
- Josefa Celsa Señaris (born 1965), Venezuelan herpetologist
- Josefa de Godoy di Bassano, 2nd Viscountess of Rocafuerte (1834-1882), Spanish-Italian aristocrat
- Josefa de Óbidos (1630–1684), Spanish-Portuguese painter
- Josefa de Tudó, 1st Countess of Castillo Fiel (1779–1869), mistress of Manuel de Godoy
- Josefa Dimuri (21st century), Fijian politician
- Josefa Francisco (1954–2015), Philippine academic and women's rights activist
- Josefa Vicenta Giambastiani de Peláez (1891–1974), Argentine geologist
- Josefa González Blanco Ortiz Mena (born 1965), Mexican ecologist and politician
- Josefa Humpalová–Zeman (1870–1906), Czech-American journalist, newspaper founder and feminist
- Josefa Idem (born 1964), West German-Italian sprint canoeist
- Josefa Iloilo (1920–2011), President of Fiji
- Josefa Joaquina Sánchez (1765–1813), Venezuelan heroin
- Josefa Köster (1918–2011), West German sprint canoeist
- Josefa Llanes Escoda (1898–1945), National Executive of the Girl Scouts of the Philippines
- Josefa Martín Luengo (1944–2009), Spanish educator
- Josefa Jara Martinez (1894–1987), Philippine social worker, suffragist and civic leader
- Josefa Moe (1933–2006), American entertainer
- Josefa Ordonez (1728-fl. 1792), Mexican actress and courtesan
- Josefa Ortiz de Domínguez (1768-1829), supporter of the Mexican War of Independence
- Josefa Antonia Perdomo y Heredia (1834–1896), Dominican poet
- Josefa Rika (born 1987), Fijian cricketer
- Josefa Sacko, Angolan agronomist, economist and diplomat
- Josefa Salas (born 1995), Chilean field hockey player
- Josefa Vosanibola (21st century), Fijian politician
- Josefa Zaratt (1871–1962), Puerto Rican black female physician
- María Josefa García Granados (1796-1848), Guatemalan writer
- María Josefa Lastiri (1792-1846), First Lady of the Federal Republic of Central America
- María Josefa Pimentel, Duchess of Osuna (1752-1834), Spanish aristocrat
- María Luisa Josefa (1866–1937), Mexican Roman Catholic nun

== See also ==
- 649 Josefa, a minor planet
- Josefina
- Josepha
