= Urale =

Urale is a surname. Notable people with the surname include:

- Makerita Urale, New Zealand documentary director
- Sima Urale, New Zealand filmmaker
