= Iosefa Enari =

New Zealand singer

Iosefa Enari (1954 – 22 October 2000) was a New Zealand opera singer who was born in Samoa. The Iosefa Enari Memorial Award, presented annually by Creative New Zealand, recognises Enari's pioneering contribution to Pacific Islands opera. Enari was the Artistic Director of Classical Polynesia, the first New Zealand opera combining traditional Samoan words and music with classical opera.

== Background ==
Enari was born in Samoa and moved to Auckland at the age of 16 with his seven brothers and sisters. Although Enari had been singing since Sunday school and in a school rock band, his career as a professional did not start until he won the Herald Aria Competition in 1987. He later performed in New Zealand opera productions alongside notable opera singers such as Dame Malvina Major. In 1993, Enari was the recipient of a New Zealand Fulbright cultural grant which allowed him to study opera in the United States. In 1996, Creative New Zealand awarded him the Senior Pacific Artist Award.

In 2000, Enari died in New Caledonia while he was attending the Festival of Pacific Arts with a delegation of New Zealand artists. He was given a moving farewell by Maori, Pacific Islands and Kanak artists. Creative New Zealand later created the Iosefa Enari Memorial Award in his honour. The award is given annually by Creative New Zealand to support the career development of individual Pacific singers across all classical vocal genres and career stages.

== Classical Polynesia ==
Enari was the Artistic Director and creator of Classical Polynesia, an operatic work of Samoan songs and music rearranged to opera by Samoan-born New Zealand composer Igelese Ete. In 1998, Classical Polynesia premiered at the New Zealand International Festival of the Arts at the Illot Concert Chamber, Wellington Town Hall. A second performance, aimed at the Pacific Islands community, was held in Cannons Creek, Porirua with an introduction by Oscar Kightley. The choreographer was Cook Islander Teokotai Paitai and the producer Makerita Urale.

Classical Polynesia featured emerging Pacific voices in opera and classical music, at the time, including Jonathan Lemalu (bass), Ben Makisi (tenor), Daphne Collins (soprano), Aivale Cole (soprano), violinist Sam Konise and a chorus made up of Pacific youth.

The narrative of the work was based on 'One day in the life of a Samoan village.' The music for the work was inspired by the 1960s recordings of Samoan songs made by the Samoan Teachers College and the Samoan composer Tuala Falenaoti Tiresa Malietoa.

== Theatre ==
Enari was also an actor. In 1995 he played the role of Old Deuteronomy in a production of Cats. In 1996, he played the lead role of the father in A Frigate Bird Sings, a Samoan play about fa'afafine which was commissioned for Tu Fa'atasi, the Pacific arts component of the New Zealand International Festival of the Arts 1996.

Enari performed as an actor in other theatre productions, including shows by Christchurch based Pacific theatre company Pacific Underground.

== Awards ==
- 1993 Fulbright New Zealand Cultural Grant
- 1996 Senior Pacific Artist Award
