= Miriam College =

Catholic women's college in Quezon City, Philippines

- Kolehiyo ng Miriam (Filipino)
- College seal featuring the Chi Rho symbol
- Former names: Malabon Normal School (1926–1936); Maryknoll Normal College (1936–1953); Maryknoll College (1953–1989)
- Motto: Veritas (Latin)
- Motto in English: Truth
- Type: Private exclusive all-girls Basic and Higher education institution
- Established: 1926; 100 years ago
- Religious affiliation: Roman Catholic
- Academic affiliations: ACUCA; IFCU; ACWCUA (Note: Alliance of Christian Women’s Colleges and Universities in Asia); ASACCU (Note: Association of Southeast Asian Catholic Colleges and Universities)
- Chairperson: Josefina Tan
- President: Dr. Maria Regina Lucia M. Lizarez
- Vice-president: Jasmin Nario-Galace (Academic Affairs); Maria Concepcion Lupisan (Finance)
- Principal: Nancy Roman (High School); Amabelle Cariño (Child Study Center)
- Director: Noel Racho (Human Resources); Agustin Alvarez, Jr. (Administrative Services); Maria Louella Tampinco (Basic Education)
- Location: Katipunan Avenue, Loyola Heights, Quezon City, Metro Manila, Philippines; 14°38′34″N 121°04′40″E
- Campus: Urban Main Loyola Heights, Quezon City Satellite Nuvali, Canlubang, Calamba, Laguna
- Colors: Blue and Gold
- Mascot: María Katipunera
- Website: www.mc.edu.ph
- Location in Metro Manila Location in Luzon Location in the Philippines

Miriam College (Filipino: Kolehiyo ng Miriam) is a non-stock, non-profit Filipino Catholic educational institution for girls and young women in Quezon City, Philippines. It also has two satellite campuses in Sta. Rosa, Laguna and Porac, Pampanga.

It offers academic programs from pre-elementary to post-graduate and adult education levels that develop the learning and caring competencies of students and are enriched by a wide range of national, regional, and international linkages.

Although primarily an educational institution for women, its pre-elementary, graduate, adult education, and deaf education programs accept male students. Its satellite campuses are fully co-educational.

== History ==
The history of Miriam College dates back to 1926 when Archbishop of Manila Michael J. O'Doherty requested the Maryknoll Sisters of St. Dominic of Ossning, New York to initiate a teacher-training program for women in the Philippines. In an old remodeled Augustinian convent in Malabon, the Malabon Normal School was established. The school moved several times until 1952, when was officially renamed to Maryknoll College, and permanently settled on the eastern edge of Diliman (now Loyola Heights) in Quezon City.

After the Second Vatican Council, the Maryknoll congregation began to evaluate its work in the light of their original apostolate as a missionary order. In the 1960s, the Maryknoll congregation saw the readiness of the Filipino laity to continue the education mission they had started.

During the Marcos dictatorship, the Maryknoll community was known for being one of the Catholic educational institutions most active in protesting the abuses and excesses of the regime. A prominent leader was Sr Helen Graham, who became a founding member of Task Force Detainees of the Philippines after one of her students was picked up as a political detainee. Another Maryknoll figure of the resistance of the dictatorship was High School alumnus Suellen Escribano, who gave up her life of comfort in order to serve the women and farmers living in the border area of Quezon and Bicol provinces, helping them resist the efforts of landgrabbers. The significance Escribano's work would later be recognized by the Philippines' Bantayog ng mga Bayani, which honors the martyrs and heroes that fought to restore democracy during the regime. The Maryknoll sisters were prominent in the crowd that formed the People Power revolution of 1986, which led to the ouster of the Marcos family, and Sr. Helen Graham's diary entries were later published by the Philippine Daily Inquirer as a day by day breakdown of the events as they happened.

In 1977, the ownership and management of the school was turned over to lay administrators. In accordance with the agreement, the name Maryknoll was to be changed to pave the way for the promotion of the school's unique identity, distinct although not disconnected from the identity of the Maryknoll sisters. In 1989, after a series of consultations, Maryknoll College was renamed Miriam College.

Miriam College stopped accepting male students at the collegiate level in 1999. The last batch of male students, who had entered the college in 1998, graduated in 2002, thereby making Miriam College an exclusive all-women's college. However, the preschool, adult education, graduate school, and deaf-mute education departments remain as co-educational and are still open to males.

=== Presidents ===
The first lay president and first female president of a Catholic college in the Philippines was Dr. Paz V. Adriano, who had been a student of the Maryknoll nuns. The second president was Dr. Lourdes Quisumbing, who later became the Secretary of Education under Corazon Aquino, the 11th president of the Philippines. The third was Dr. Loreta Castro; the fourth was Dr. Patricia B. Licuanan, who is currently the chairperson of the Commission on Higher Education. Dr. Rosario Oreta Lapus later served as president from 2010 to 2019. The current president is Ambassador Laura Quiambao-del Rosario, former Department of Foreign Affairs undersecretary and diplomat.

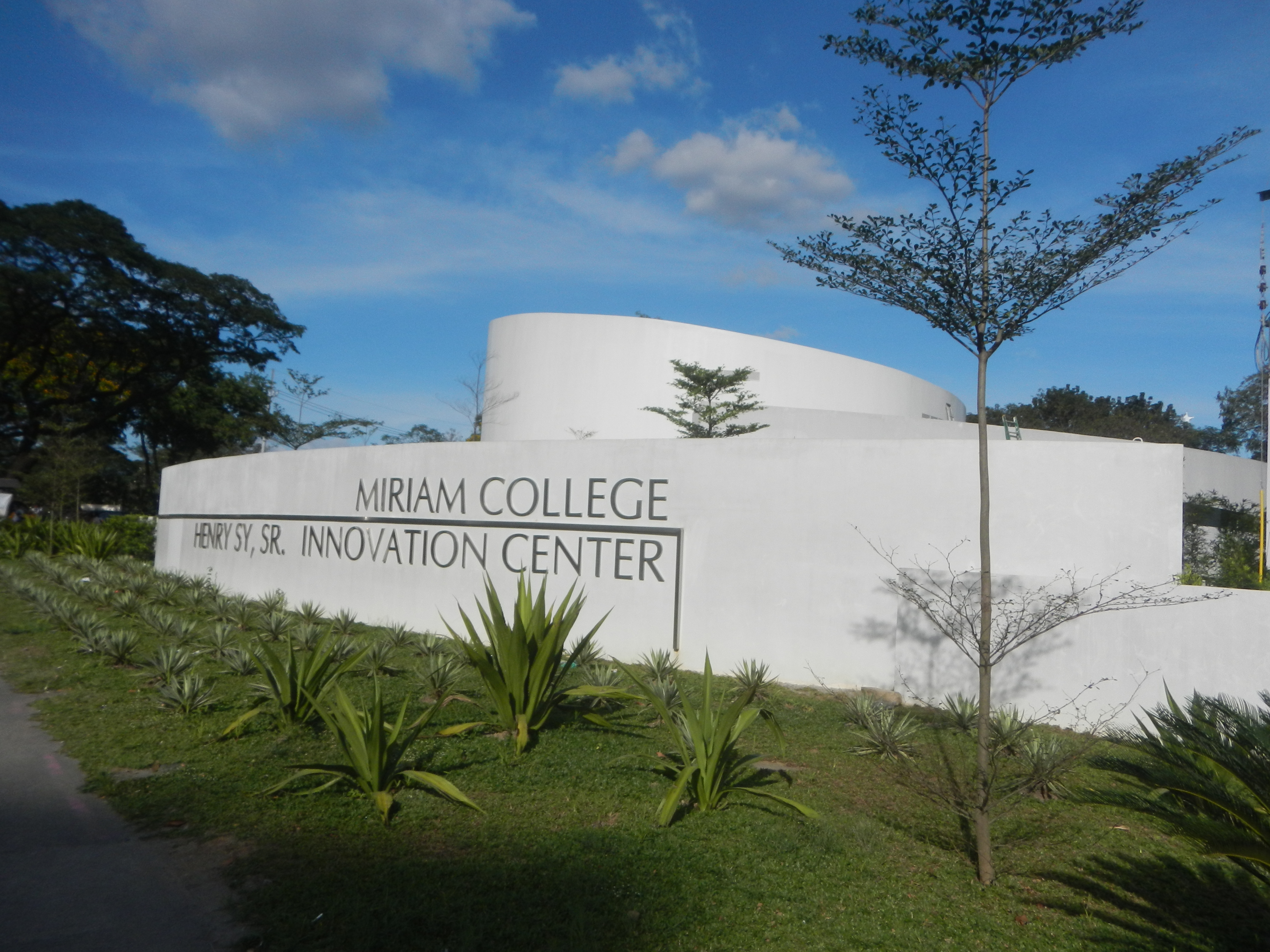
Henry Sy, Sr. Innovation Center

== Campus facilities ==
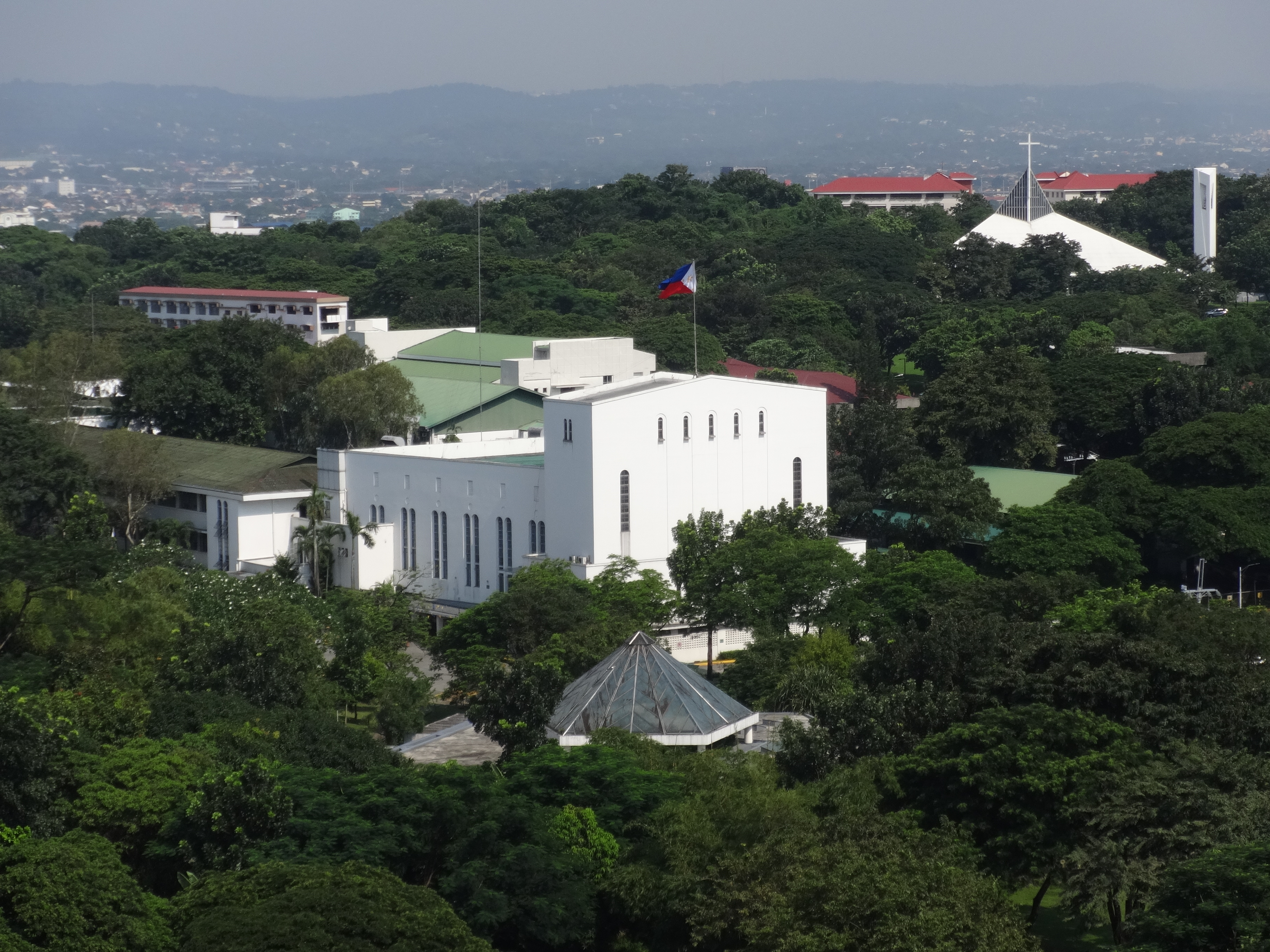
Main Building of the Quezon City campus

Campus facilities include a modern, four-story LEAD Residence Hall for college students and guests, the Gallery of Women's Art featuring donated works from women artists, the Marian Auditorium for institutional events, the Little Theater for smaller events, the Mini-Forest Park, a chapel, Stations of the Cross, Library Media Center, and the Child Development and Day Care Center.

=== Miriam College Nuvali ===
Miriam College's first satellite Nuvali campus was opened in 2014. A coeducational campus, it is located along Diversity Avenue corner Evoliving Parkway, Nuvali, Calamba, Laguna.

=== Miriam College Alviera ===
Their third campus sits on 10-hectare property inside the Alviera township by Ayala Land, Inc. in Porac, Pampanga. The campus offers a basic education program for kindergarten, grade school and junior high school students, with plans to launch higher education and vocational programs in the future. It was launched in August 2025.

== Notable alumni ==
- Roxanne Barcelo - actress, singer, children's show host
- Iza Calzado - actress
- Nieves Confesor - dean of the Asian Institute of Management; former Secretary of Labor and Employment
- Nikki Coseteng - former senator
- Gaby Dela Merced - Formula Three race car driver, actress
- Aloysius Schwartz - Venerated Roman Catholic priest
- Andi Eigenmann - actress
- Josefa Francisco - academic, former departmental head of the Department of International Studies and women's rights activist
- Coney Reyes - actress, host
- Tina Paner - singer, entrepreneur
- Juris Fernandez - singer
- Nina Girado - pop and R&B singer, songwriter, record producer, commercial model, television and radio personality
- Alodia Gosiengfiao - model, presenter, cosplayer, recording artist, and online streamer
- Chin Chin Gutierrez - former actress, environmentalist
- Pauleen Luna - actress, model, wife of Vic Sotto
- Maxene Magalona - actress, model
- Andi Manzano - MTV VJ, DJ, print ad model
- Margie Moran - Miss Universe 1973, socialite, granddaughter of former president Manuel Roxas
- Dianne Medina - actress, dancer, television host, anchor and part-time model
- Korina Sanchez - broadcast journalist
- Leah Navarro - singer
- Karel Marquez - actress, former MYX VJ
- Chat Silayan - actress, Miss Universe 1980 third runner-up
- Jannelle So - sports commentator
- Donya Tesoro - Mayor of San Manuel, Tarlac
- Doris Bigornia - host and reporter
- Marissa Camurungan - actress, singer, host, wife of Ronnie Ricketts
- Julia Barretto - actress, former high school volleyball player
- Jane Oineza - actress
- Dennis Trillo - actor, singer
- Diana Zubiri - actress
- Hilda Koronel - actress
- Celeste Legaspi - artist, producer
- Lovi Poe - actress, singer, daughter of Fernando Poe Jr.
