= Donya Tesoro =

Filipina politician

The Honorable Donya Tesoro
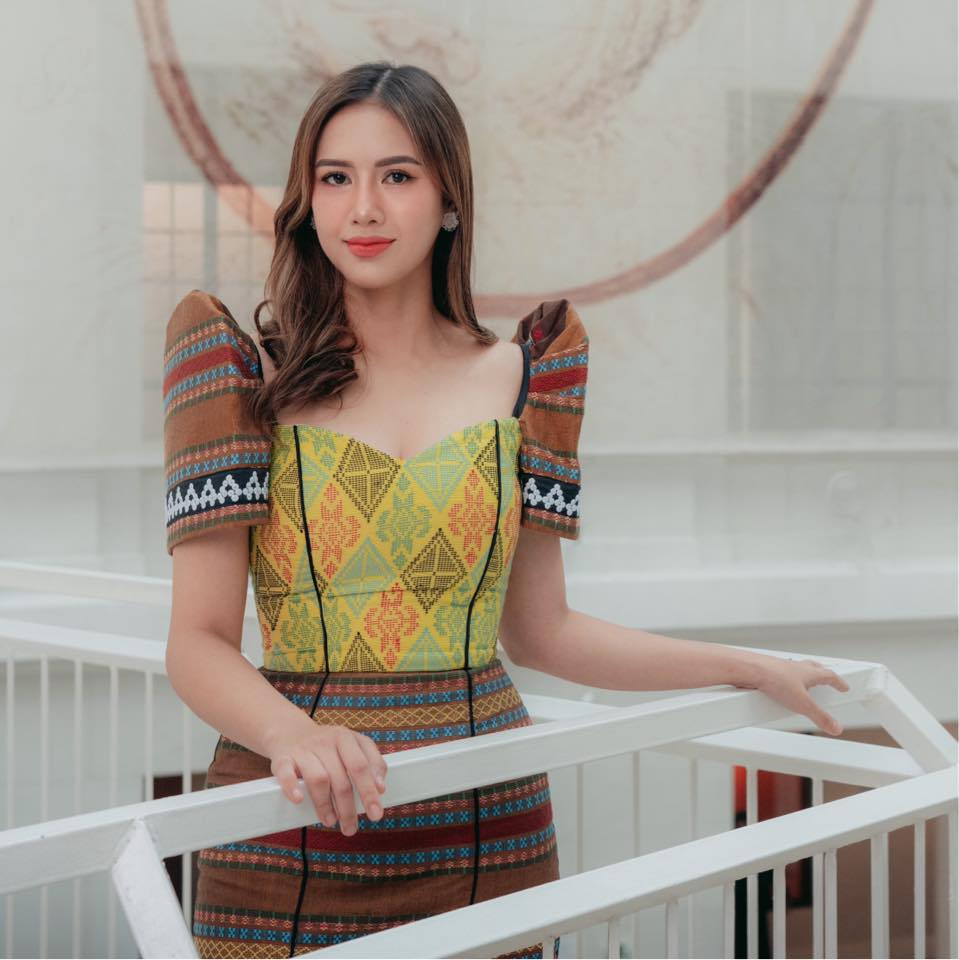
- Tesoro in 2023

Mayor of San Manuel, Tarlac
- Incumbent
- Assumed office June 30, 2019
- Vice Mayor: Benjamin D. Tesoro Sr. (2019–2022); Edy B. Felix (acting) (2022); Benjamin R. Tesoro Jr. (2022–present)
- Preceded by: Benjamin D. Tesoro

Vice Mayor of San Manuel, Tarlac
- In office June 30, 2016 – June 30, 2019
- Mayor: Benjamin D. Tesoro Sr.
- Succeeded by: Benjamin D. Tesoro Sr.

Member of the San Manuel, Tarlac Municipal Council
- In office June 30, 2013 – June 30, 2016

Personal details
- Born: Doña Cresencia Reyes Tesoro; April 5, 1991 (age 35) San Manuel, Tarlac, Philippines
- Party: NPC (2015–2018; 2021–present)
- Other political affiliations: PFP (2018–2021); Lakas (2012–2015)
- Education: Miriam College (AB); Ateneo de Manila University (MPM)

Doña Cresencia "Donya" Reyes Tesoro (born April 5, 1991) is a Filipina politician serving as the mayor of San Manuel, Tarlac, since 2019. She previously served as the municipality's vice mayor from 2016 to 2019, and was a councilor from 2013 to 2016.

== Early life ==
Tesoro was born on born April 5, 1991. Her father, Benjamin "Bening" D. Tesoro (died 2022), was a former military officer who served as mayor of San Manuel, Tarlac and previously served as his vice mayor.

She graduated high school from OB Montessori Center in Greenhills, San Juan. After receiving a Bachelor of Arts degree in communication from Miriam College, she immediately ran for councilor in her town. She received a master's degree in Public Management in 2018 from the Ateneo School of Government while she was the vice mayor of San Manuel.

== Political career ==
Before she became mayor, she served as a Municipal Councilor from 2013 to 2016 and Municipal Vice Mayor from 2016 to 2019 of San Manuel.

She also served as the Executive Vice President of the Lady Local Legislators League (4L) of the Philippines from 2016 to 2019.

== Electoral history ==
Electoral history of Donya Tesoro
Year	Office	Party	Votes received				Result
Year	Office	Party	Total	%	P.	Swing	Result
2013	Councilor (San Manuel, Tarlac)	Lakas	4,657	-	2nd	—N/a	Won
2016	Vice Mayor of San Manuel, Tarlac	NPC	6,815	55.58%	1st	—N/a	Won
2019	Mayor of San Manuel, Tarlac	PFP	7,757	57.24%	1st	—N/a	Won
2022	Mayor of San Manuel, Tarlac	NPC	10,395	69.99%	1st	+12.75	Won
2025	Mayor of San Manuel, Tarlac	NPC	11,103	61.43%	1st	-8.56	Won
