= Makerita Urale =

Samoan dramatist in New Zealand

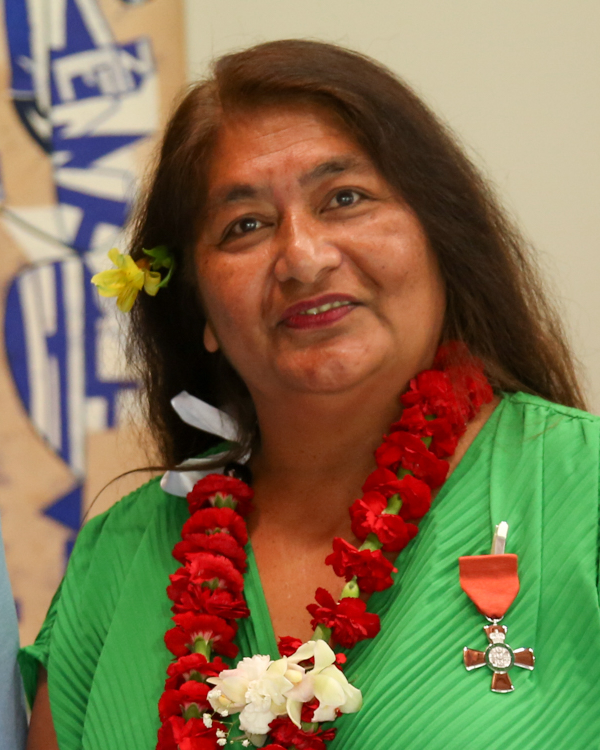
Urale in 2024

Vaosa ole Tagaloa Makerita Urale MNZM is a documentary director and playwright, and a leading figure in contemporary Polynesian theatre in New Zealand. She has produced landmark productions in the performing arts. She is the writer of the play Frangipani Perfume, the first Pacific play written by a woman for an all-female cast. Working in different art mediums, Urale also works in film and television. She is the director of the political documentary Children of the Revolution that won the Qantas Award (2008) for Best Māori Programme.

== Early life ==
Urale was born on the island of Savai'i in Samoa. The family moved to New Zealand in the 1970s where they lived in Wellington.

In 2010 Urale received the Fulbright New Zealand Pacific Writer’s Residency at the University of Hawai’i.

== Biography ==
=== Playwright ===
In 2000 Urale's play Frangipani Perfume (1998) was listed Top 10 plays of the decade by literary magazine The New Zealand Listener. The play was first staged at Bats Theatre in Wellington in 1998 with a cast of three women that included her sister Sima. The director of the first production was Erolia Ifopo followed by other directors when the play toured the country and internationally. In 2004, the play was published by Play Press and is a key text in theatre studies at schools and universities. The play is about three sisters, born in the tropical islands of Polynesia, who move to New Zealand where they work as cleaners. The story explores the women's dreams and aspirations through the use of lyrical poetry, imagery and stylised movement. The play was nominated for Most Original Production at the Chapman Tripp Theatre Awards. The play has toured in New Zealand as well as internationally, including to Canada, Australia and UK. It has also had playreadings in Toronto and New York.

Urale has written plays for children, including The Magic Seashell and Popo the Fairy as well as children's books and feature articles in magazines.

Frangipani Perfume is a dense and complex piece, interrogating the Pacific diaspora through an array of theatrical strategies.

— Hilary Alba, Australasian Drama Studies, October 2006

=== Producer ===
In theatre, Urale was the producer of a number of major productions for the bi-annual New Zealand International Festival of the Arts in Wellington. She was producer of A Frigate Bird Sings (1996) directed by Nathaniel Lees and co-written by Oscar Kightley and Dave Fane, staged at Downstage Theatre. The play was nominated Best Production, Best Director and Best Set Design at the Chapman Tripp Theatre Awards. Other productions include Ricordi (1996) at the State Opera House, written by Peter Wells and directed by Colin McColl, Beauty and the Beast (1998) staged at St James Theatre, and the Samoan operatic work Classical Polynesia (1998) directed by Iosefa Enari and starring Jonathan Lemalu. Other theatre productions include The Debate (1995), Duty Free (1998), five short plays by Māori writers directed by Tanea Heke, Two Days in Dream (2003) written by Mario Gaoa, Sex with Strangers (2004) directed by Colin Mitchell as well as working on Paradise (2003), directed by Lemi Ponifasio for Auckland Festival. In 2007, she was the event producer of the opening festival of Tagata o le Moana, the permanent Pacific exhibition at National Museum of New Zealand, which brought together performers and artists around the country. In 2008, she produced the short film Journey to Ihipa directed by Nancy Brunning.

In the arts, there is light, hope and breathtaking beauty in innovation, courage and creativity. (Makerita Urale 2021)

=== Documentary film director ===
Urale has directed a number of documentaries, including Savage Symbols (2002), which premiered at the New Zealand International Film Festival,Gang Girl – Tarnz's Story (2005), Mob Daughters (2006) and Nesian Mystik (2006). The award winning documentary Children of the Revolution focused on the children of iconic political activists in New Zealand as well as landmark protest movements during the 1970s and 1980s. The documentary featured interviews with Māori activists Tame Iti, Māori Party Member of Parliament Hone Harawira and his wife, former NZ Green Party MP Sue Bradford, musician and Polynesian Panthers Minister of Culture Tigilau Ness, anti-apartheid leader John Minto. Hip-hop star Che Fu is the son of Ness, and he features as one of the children. Other works include freelancing for the television arts series The Living Room,The Gravy, a short experimental documentary The Other Day in Paradise as well as directing an AV installation in the permanent Pacific exhibition at the National Museum of New Zealand. Urale has produced numerous music videos including Reverse Resistance, Groovilation, Ko Wai Ka Hua and the underwater Sub-Cranium Feeling for King Kapisi, directed by her sister Sima. Filmed underwater, the music video won best music video awards including Flying Fish, BFM and TVNZ Mai Time. In 2003, the video received an award from New Zealand On Air for contribution to music video making in New Zealand.

=== Arts leader ===
Since 2011 Urale has worked at Creative New Zealand, the arts funding and advocacy agency of the New Zealand Government. In 2023 she was in the role of Senior Manager Pacific Arts.

In the 2024 New Year Honours, Urale was appointed a Member of the New Zealand Order of Merit, for services to Pacific arts.

== Personal life ==
Urale has two brothers and three sisters, who also work in the arts and media. Urale's sister Sima Urale is a filmmaker and brother King Kapisi is a hip-hop artist.
