= Josefa Vicenta Giambastiani de Peláez =

Argentine geologist (1891–1974)

Josefa Vicenta Giambastiani de Peláez (10 April 1891–1974) was an Argentine geologist and the first woman to receive the title of Doctor in Geological Sciences from the Faculty of Exact, Physical and Natural Sciences of the National University of Córdoba. She wrote one of the classic textbooks for teaching geology in Argentina, published by Peuser in 1935, with numerous reissues and in addition to her discoveries in petrology, mineralogy and marble chemistry.

== Biography ==
Born Josefa Vicenta Giambastiani in Río Cuarto, Córdoba, Argentina, she became the first woman to earn a doctorate in Geological Sciences at the Faculty of Exact, Physical and Natural Sciences of the National University of Córdoba, in 1931. Her PhD thesis was titled On the limestones from the El Sauce quarries: Mineralogical and chemical study and comparisons with other limestones from the Sierra de Córdoba and concerned petrography, mineralogy and chemistry of the quarry marbles. Her research revealed that she had discovered a geological twin: a symmetrical grouping of identical crystals, which is rare in calcite, a mineral.

She was "an exceptional secondary school teacher and was well known in the city of Córdoba and in the main cities of the province such as San Francisco and Río Cuarto." She wrote numerous school textbooks and educational material aimed at primary and secondary education, highlighting her textbook: Nociones de Mineralología y Geología Argentinas.

She was passionate about her stewardship of the Florentino Ameghino Museum. She served as deputy director of the Council of Education of the Province of Córdoba, which financially supported the museum and its outreach activities. The museum is used by school students and teachers as a space to learn and explore its many collections of rocks, minerals, relief maps and artifacts.

== Personal life ==
Josefa was married to Víctor Peláez and they had five children.

== Selected works ==
- de Peláez, Josefa G. "On the limestones of the El Sauce quarries." Journal of the National University of Córdoba 18, no. 9/10 (1931).
- de Peláez, Josefa G. "Nociones de Mineralología y Geología Argentinas" (1935)
