= Erolia Ifopo =

New Zealand writer, actor and artist

Erolia Ifopo is a New Zealand-based artist and one of the founding members of Pacific Underground, a performing arts collective that celebrates the heritage of Pacific Islanders in New Zealand. Ifopo is a multidisciplinary artist who specializes in music, theatre, and dance. She has been involved in numerous projects and performances that explore Pacific Island culture, identity, and social issues. As an actor, writer, producer and director of Samoan descent, living in New Zealand her contributions to the arts and Pacific communities in New Zealand have been significant and impactful.

== Biography ==
Erolia Ifopo has also been involved with many Pacific theatre companies, including Pacific Underground and Fresh Ink. In 2011, she was awarded the Awards in Oral History for her work with the Samoan community in the Christchurch earthquakes. Some of her notable works include the play "Fresh Off The Boat" and "Romeo and Tusi" by co-written by Oscar Kightley and Erolia Ifopo. She has also performed in various theatre productions, including "Horizons".

=== Television and Shorts ===
Year	Series	Role	Notes	Ref
1992-1998	Shortland Street	Actor	Television series	
1998	The Semisis	Writer	Sketch Show	
2001	Aroha - Haka & Siva	Actor	TV Mini-series	

=== Theatre ===
Selected list of theatre activity

Year	Play	Role	Notes	Ref
1996	Tatau: Rites of Passage	Actor/Writer	Aotea Centre, Auckland	
1992	Horizons	Actor	Performing Arts Centre, Christchurch	
1997	Dawn Raids	Actor	Herald Theatre, Auckland	
1997-2000	Romeo & Tusi	Writer	Wellington, Auckland, Christchurch	
1998	Frangipani Perfume	Director	Wellington	
1993	Fresh off the boat	Actor	Free Theatre, Christchurch	
1993	Gifted and Fresh	Actor		
2001	The Native Chef	Actor/Writer	Masi Cafe, Wellington Fringe Festival	
2001	Butter Loving	Director		
2019	Scholars	Director		
