= Josefa Perdomo =

Dominican poet (1834–1896)

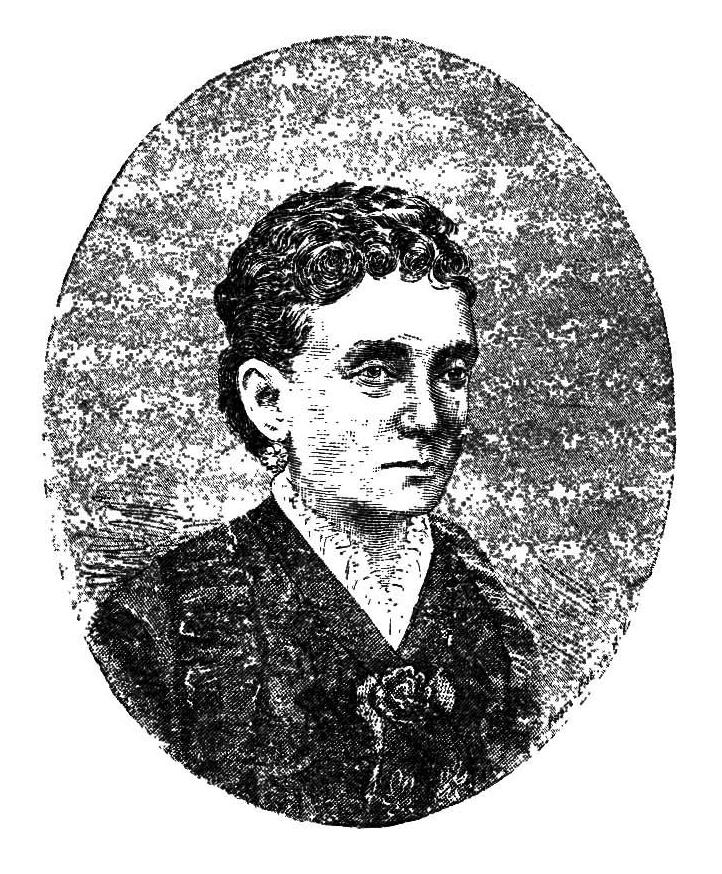
- Born: Josefa Antonia Perdomo y Heredia; 13 June 1834 Santo Domingo, Dominican Republic
- Died: 25 May 1896 (aged 61) Santo Domingo, Dominican Republic
- Occupation: Poet

Josefa Antonia Perdomo y Heredia (13 June 1834 – 25 May 1896) was a Dominican poet. She wrote under the pseudonym Laura.

== Biography ==
Perdomo was born on 13 June 1834 in Santo Domingo, Dominican Republic. Her parents were Felipe Perdomo and Mercedes Heredia. Her mother was from a noble family of merchants and landowners, which included the writer Manuel de Jesús Heredia. Literary historiography has recorded that her uncle introduced her to art and literature and instructed her in grammar.

Perdomo published her first poem Delicias del Campo in 1854 and was the first Dominican woman to publish a poem in the press. Further works were published in the newspaper El Oasis and the Catholic newspaper La Crónica in 1855 and 1856. Perdomo wrote under the pseudonym Laura.

poetry was considered traditionalist, features patriotic, religious and biographical details and was described as having "lovely verses" by Salomé Ureña. Ureña and Perdomo were the only women elected as members of the Friends of the Dominican Republic.

Politically, Perdomo supported the Dominican Republic dictator Ulises Heureaux.

Josefa Perdomo Street is named in honour of Perdomo, created by a Santo Domingo City Council resolution on 13 November 1934.

Perdomo died on 25 May 1896 in Santo Domingo, aged 61.

== Selected works ==
- Delicias del Campo (1854)
- Poesías de la Señorita Josefa Perdomo (1885)

Perdomo's poems were included in the anthology Lira de Quisqueya by José Castellanos in 1874, the Anthology of Dominican Literature by Peña Batlle in 1944, and Two Centuries of Dominican Literature by Manuel Rueda in 1996.
