= Josepha =

Josepha is a given name, a feminine variant of the name Joseph.

== People with the given name ==
- Josepha Abiertas (1894–1929), Filipino lawyer and feminist, first woman to obtain a degree from the Philippine Law School
- Josepha Barbara Auernhammer (1758–1820), Austrian pianist and composer
- Josepha Conti (1825–1881), Bavarian servant and beauty
- Josepha Williams Douglas (1860–1938), also commonly known as Josepha Williams, American physician
- Josepha Duschek (1754–1824), Czech soprano
- Josepha von Heydeck (1748–1771), mistress of Charles Theodore, Elector of Bavaria
- Josepha Petrick Kemarre (born ca. 1945 or ca. 1953), Indigenous Australian artist
- Josepha Madigan (fl. 2016–present), Irish politician and solicitor
- Josepha Sherman, American author, winner of the Compton Crook Award for the novel The Shining Falcon
- Josepha Weber (1758–1819), German soprano, sister-in-law of Mozart
- Josepha Newcomb Whitney (1871–after 1955), American clubwoman, pacifist, suffragist and politician

== Fictional characters ==
- Josepha Hickey, a character in Now you see me

== See also ==
- Josefa
