= Aivale Cole =

- Born: Mabel Faletolu; Wellington, New Zealand
- Genre: classical
- Occupation: Singer
- Instrument: Vocals

Aivale Cole (née Mabel Faletolu) is a soprano singer from New Zealand.

== Background ==
Cole was born Mabel Faletolu in Wellington, New Zealand.

In 2005, Cole graduated from the Australian Opera Studio and was awarded the Dux Prize. She also has a BA in Performance Art from NASDA (National Academy of Singing and Dramatic Arts) in Christchurch and a Diploma in Performance Art (Opera) from the University of Auckland.

== Career ==
Cole is a soprano opera singer. She has performed in concert and opera performances in New Zealand and internationally, including in the United Kingdom, China, Japan, Australia, Fiji, and New Caledonia.

In 2008, she debuted in the title role of the West Australian Opera's production of Aida by Verdi.

Cole worked with Howard Shore and the New Zealand Symphony Orchestra on the music of The Lord of the Rings, and is a featured vocalist in the soundtrack for The Fellowship Of The Ring.

== Awards ==
Cole was the winner of the 2009 the Lexus Song Quest.

At the 2008 Helpmann Awards she was nominated for Best Performance in a Classical Concert with her performance of Madama Butterfly at Opera in the Park.

She won the 2006 Iosefa Enari Memorial Award in the Arts Pasifka Awards from Creative New Zealand and the 2006 Lockwood Aria Competition (now New Zealand Aria Competition). She was also a finalist for the 2006 McDonald's Operatic Aria competition.
