= San Manuel, Tarlac =

Municipality in Tarlac, Philippines

San Manuel
- Municipality
- Municipality of San Manuel
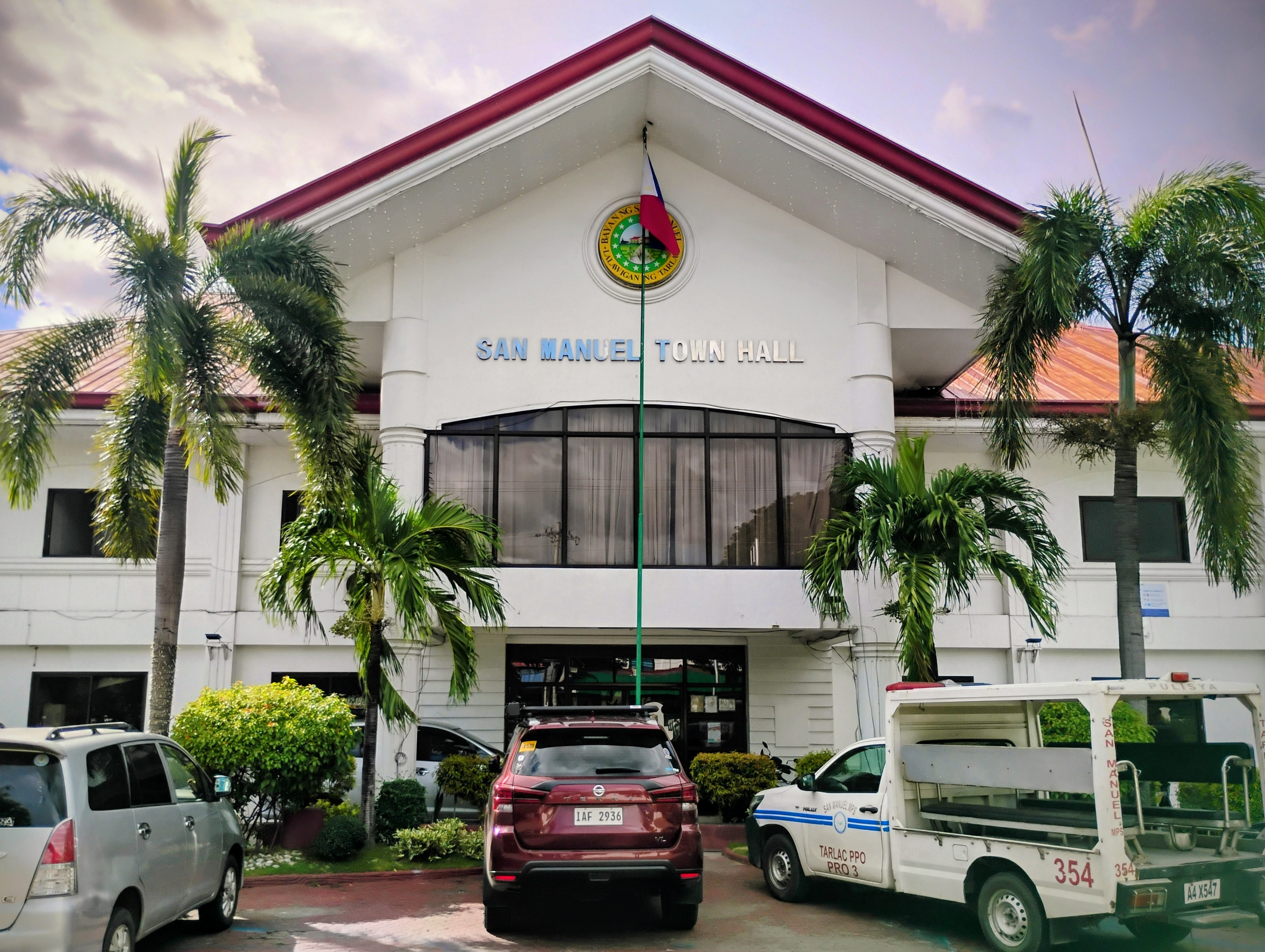
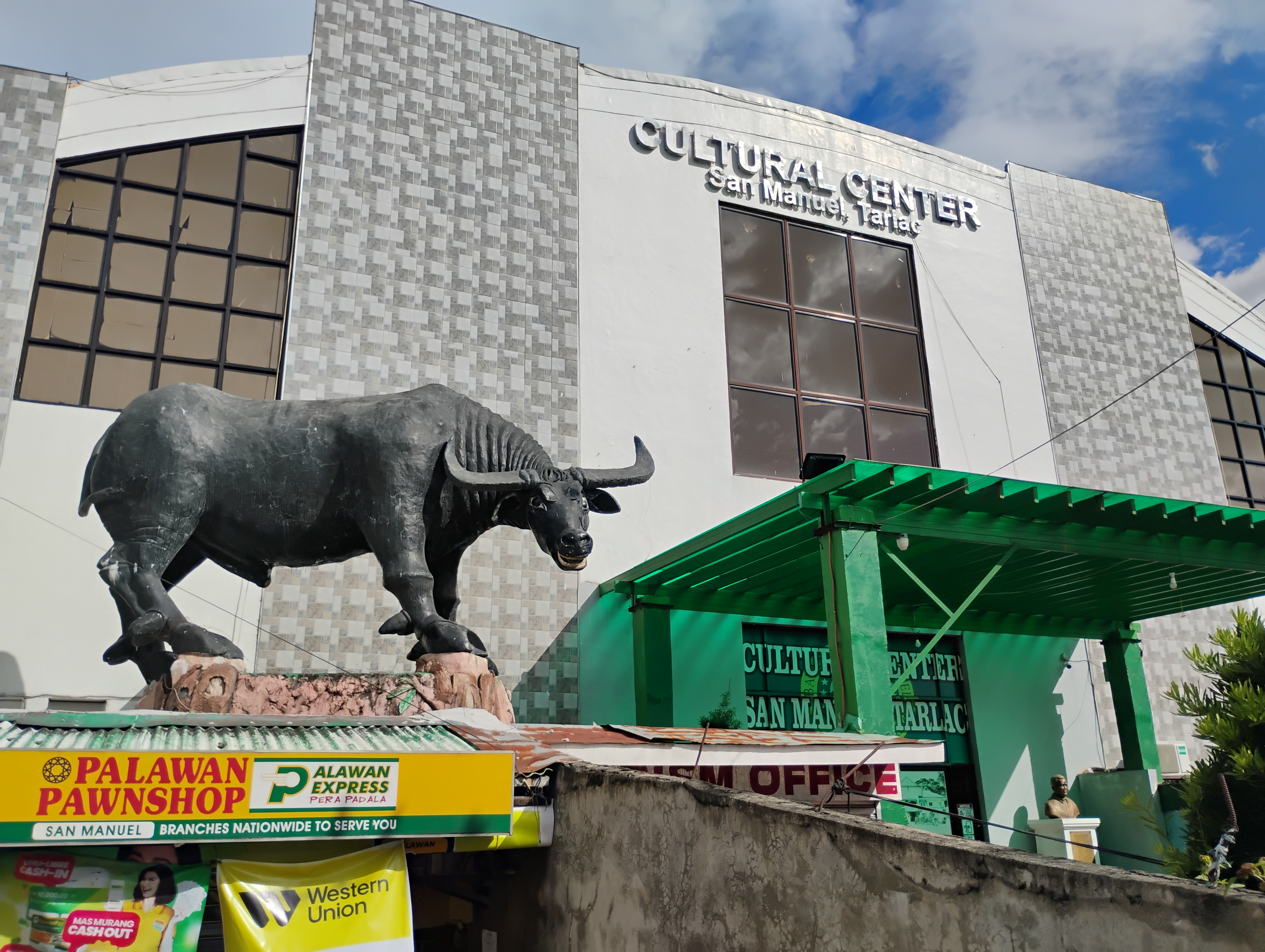
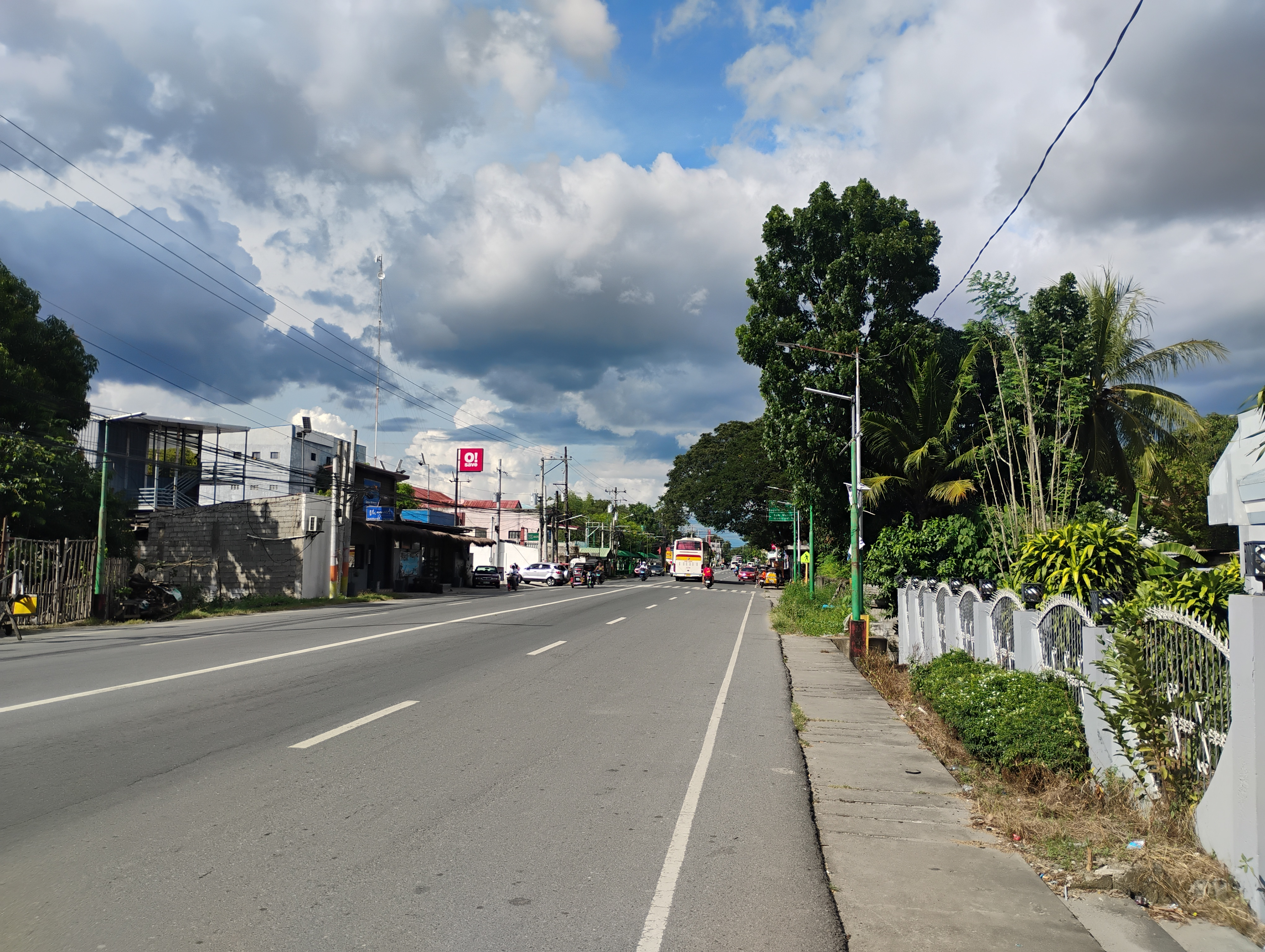
- San Manuel Town Hall San Manuel Cultural Center MacArthur Highway in San Manuel

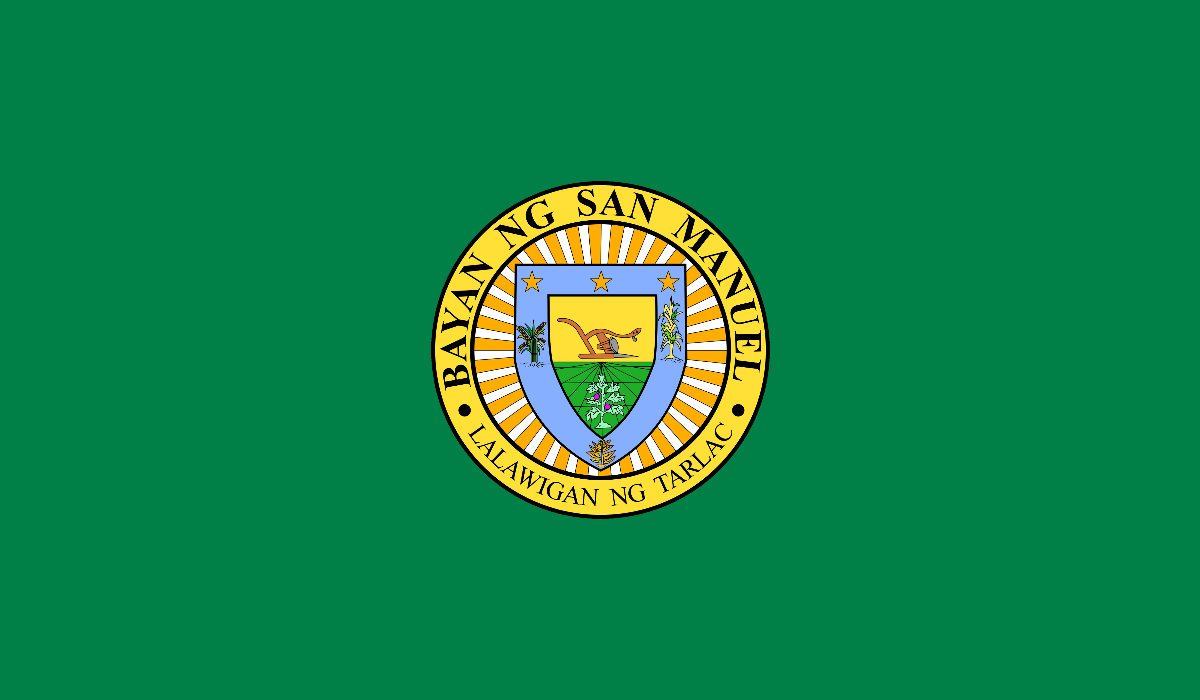
- Flag Seal
- Nickname: Logistics Hub of the North
- Motto: Sulong pa, Bagong San Manuel!
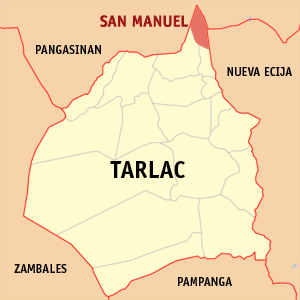
- Map of Tarlac with San Manuel highlighted
- Interactive map of San Manuel
- Location within the Philippines
- Coordinates: 15°47′51″N 120°36′26″E
- Country: Philippines
- Region: Central Luzon
- Province: Tarlac
- District: 1st district
- Founded: February 25, 1902
- Barangays: 15 (see Barangays)

Government
  - Type: Sangguniang Bayan
  - Mayor: Doña Cresencia R. Tesoro
  - Vice Mayor: Atty. Sir Benjamin R. Tesoro
  - Representative: Jaime D. Cojuangco
  - Electorate: 18,075 voters (2025)

Area
  - Total: 42.10 km^{2} (16.25 sq mi)
- Elevation: 24 m (79 ft)
- Highest elevation: 59 m (194 ft)
- Lowest elevation: 15 m (49 ft)

Population (2024 census)
  - Total: 29,693
  - Density: 705.3/km^{2} (1,827/sq mi)
  - Households: 7,000

Economy
  - Income class: 1st municipal income class
  - Poverty incidence: 11.84% (2023)
  - Revenue: ₱ 294.1 million (2024)
  - Assets: ₱ 825.5 million (2024)
  - Expenditure: ₱ 238.1 million (2024)
  - Liabilities: ₱ 177.5 million (2024)

Service provider
  - Electricity: Tarlac 1 Electric Cooperative (TARELCO 1)
- Time zone: UTC+8 (PST)
- ZIP code: 2309
- PSGC: 0306914000
- IDD : area code: +63 (0)45
- Native languages: Pangasinan; Ilocano; Tagalog; Kapampangan
- Website: www.sanmanueltarlac.gov.ph

San Manuel, officially the Municipality of San Manuel (Ilocano: Ili ti San Manuel; Pangasinan: Baley na San Manuel; Tagalog: Bayan ng San Manuel), is a municipality in the province of Tarlac, Philippines. According to the 2024 census, it has a population of 29,693 people.

== History ==
When the barrio of San Jose was separated from the town of Moncada to be proclaimed a sister municipality in 1909, they renamed it “San Manuel” in honor of their benefactor, Don Manuel de Leon.

San Manuel was originally covered with dense forest, lakes and creeks. Wild animals roamed into the wilderness. Settlers from Zambales and Pangasinan - and later those from the Ilocos Region - inhabited into the area to start a new life.

The residents of this barrio then did not know which jurisdiction they belonged. There are four towns surrounding the area namely: Moncada in the south; Anao and Cuyapo in the east and Alcala in the north. Neither of these duly organized municipalities claimed the sprawling area. However, an incident in the barrio helped the people solved the “jurisdiction” problem. A man gathering bees fell from the tree and died. The people immediately reported the incident to the nearby localities but only the Moncada authorities came and investigated the incident. Spurred by the gestures of the people of that town, they joined and submitted themselves under their jurisdiction and finally became an integral part of Moncada.

== Geography ==
The Provinces of Pangasinan and Nueva Ecija border it to the north and east, respectively; while the municipalities of Anao and Moncada border the town to the south.

From Manila, the town is accessible via the MacArthur Highway, or via the NLEX (North Luzon Expressway), SCTEX (Subic-Clark-Tarlac Expressway) and TPLEX (Tarlac–Pangasinan–La Union Expressway); it is the last town of Tarlac before entering the town of Rosales in the province of Pangasinan.

San Manuel is 161 kilometres (100 mi) from Manila and is 37 kilometres (23 mi) from the provincial capital, Tarlac City.

=== Barangays ===
San Manuel is politically subdivided into 15 barangays, as shown below. Each barangay consists of puroks and some have sitios.

- Colubot
- Lanat
- Legaspi
- Mangandingay
- Matarannoc
- Pacpaco
- Poblacion
- Salcedo
- San Agustin
- San Felipe
- San Jacinto
- San Miguel
- San Narciso
- San Vicente
- Santa Maria

=== Climate ===
Climate data for San Manuel, Tarlac
Month	Jan	Feb	Mar	Apr	May	Jun	Jul	Aug	Sep	Oct	Nov	Dec	Year
Mean daily maximum °C (°F)	30 (86)	31 (88)	33 (91)	34 (93)	33 (91)	31 (88)	29 (84)	29 (84)	29 (84)	30 (86)	30 (86)	29 (84)	31 (87)
Mean daily minimum °C (°F)	19 (66)	19 (66)	20 (68)	22 (72)	24 (75)	24 (75)	24 (75)	24 (75)	24 (75)	22 (72)	21 (70)	20 (68)	22 (71)
Average precipitation mm (inches)	5 (0.2)	5 (0.2)	10 (0.4)	23 (0.9)	136 (5.4)	191 (7.5)	245 (9.6)	241 (9.5)	200 (7.9)	108 (4.3)	36 (1.4)	12 (0.5)	1,212 (47.8)
Average rainy days	2.6	2.5	4.4	8.3	20.9	24.4	27.4	26.9	25.0	18.2	9.2	3.6	173.4
Source: Meteoblue

== Demographics ==
Population census of San Manuel
Year	Pop.	±% p.a.
1918	3,564	—
1939	5,919	+2.45%
1948	7,896	+3.25%
1960	8,956	+1.06%
1970	10,683	+1.78%
1975	12,803	+3.70%
1980	13,491	+1.05%
1990	17,261	+2.50%
1995	19,120	+1.94%
2000	20,857	+1.88%
2007	23,463	+1.64%
2010	24,289	+1.27%
2015	25,504	+0.93%
2020	28,387	+2.28%
2024	29,693	+1.09%
Source: Philippine Statistics Authority

In the 2020 census, the population of San Manuel, Tarlac, was 28,387 people, with a density of 670 inhabitants per square kilometre or 1,700 inhabitants per square mile.

=== Languages ===
Ilocano, Kapampangan, and Pangasinan are commonly spoken, with Tagalog and English as official languages used for secondary education, business, and governance.

== Economy ==
Poverty incidence of San Manuel (%)

Source: Philippine Statistics Authority

The town of San Manuel is a typically rural community located at the northernmost horn of the Province of Tarlac.

== Government ==
=== Elected officials ===
2025-2028 San Manuel, Tarlac Officials
Position	Name	Party
Mayor	Doña Cresencia R. Tesoro	NPC
Vice Mayor	Sir Benjamin R. Tesoro	NPC
Councilors	Edwin B. Co	NPC
Councilors	Francisco M. Tabugan Jr.	NPC
Councilors	Abelardo G. Sunio	NPC
Councilors	Radri Y. Santiago	NPC
Councilors	Honorato D. Pastor	NPC
Councilors	Edgardo A. Caguisano	NPC
Councilors	Fe P. Relator	NPC
Councilors	Arlene S. Gravidez	NPC
Ex Officio Municipal Council Members
ABC President	TBD	Nonpartisan
SK Federation President	TBD	Nonpartisan

== Culture ==
The municipality is known to have the best corn quality in the country which they celebrate every February during their Mais Festival.

== Education ==
The San Manuel Schools District Office governs all educational institutions within the municipality. It oversees the management and operations of all private and public, from primary to secondary schools.

=== Primary and elementary schools ===
- Carthel Science Educational Foundation
- Colubot Primary School
- Gabaldon Central Elementary School
- Legaspi Elementary School
- Mangandingay Elementary School
- Matarannoc Elementary School
- Salcedo Elementary School
- San Felipe Adventist Multigrade School
- San Felipe Elementary School
- San Jacinto Elementary School
- San Manuel Elementary School
- San Miguel Elementary School
- San Narciso Elementary School
- San Vicente Elementary School
- Sta. Maria Elementary School

=== Secondary schools ===
- Pacpaco Integrated School
- San Agustin Integrated
- San Felipe High School
- San Manuel National High School
- Tarlac Information and Communication Technology High School

=== Higher educational institution ===
- OLRA College Foundation
