= Josefa Martín Luengo =

Spanish educator

Josefa Martín Luengo (Salamanca, Spain, 1944 - Salamanca, Spain, 1 July 2009), was a free pedagogy researcher.

== Biography ==
She organized Nertóbriga, a boarding school, in Fregenal de la Sierra (Badajoz province), Spain. Nertóbriga was noted for its philosophy that children learn best with freedom from coercion. Children were educated in values. This made the local administration to ask for its closing down. It was reported to Spanish Parliament, to Adolfo Suárez's government, by a socialist MP. She founded Free School (Escuela Libre) Paideia together with free pedagogy researchers Concha Castaño and María Jesús Checa in Mérida (Badajoz province), Spain, in January 1978.

Paideia Collective (Colectivo Paideia) was founded by Paideia's workers. She was a Women for Anarchy (Mujeres para la Anarquía) group member. Women for Anarchy was part of Paideia Collective.

== Books ==
- Desde nuestra Escuela (From our School)
- Intento de Educación Antiautoritaria y psicomotriz
- La escuela de la anarquía (The anarchy school)
- Paideia, una escuela libre; 25 años de educación libertaria… (Paideia, a free school; 25 years in free pedagogy)
