= Josefa Francisco =

Women's rights activist (1954–2015)

Josefa "Gigi" Francisco
- Died: 22 July 2015; Philippines
- Occupations: Researcher, Lecturer, and Global Coordinator of DAWN
- Organization(s): ISIS International; Women and Gender Institute; DAWN

Josefa "Gigi" Francisco (1954 - 22 July 2015) was a thought leader and advocate for gender equality, social justice, and women's rights from the Philippines. An alumna of Miriam College (formerly Maryknoll), Gigi Francisco is known to have strengthened the college’s international studies curriculum as member and former head of its International Studies Department. A reputable feminist hailing from the global south, she was co-founder of Miriam College’s Women and Gender Institute (WAGI), the International Gender and Trade Network (IGTN), and was Coordinator of the Development Alternatives with Women for a New Era (DAWN). Gigi served as board member in numerous development organisations and networks, and was an adviser/consultant to the United Nations on various developmental issues, using a gender equality and social inclusion lens.

== Career ==
Gigi is well-remembered by her peers to have contributed “ground breaking research on gender, poverty, development, and feminist movement building.” She was devoted to building the capacity of younger generation feminists. She served as a member of ISIS International from 1998 to 2002. The organization works on women's rights internationally. Later, she joined the Women and Gender Institute (WAGI) as the organization's executive director. The organization has been conducting various online courses on women's rights since 3 years. She was a member of the Organization for Development Alternatives for Women in a New Era, abbreviated as DAWN. The organization works to spread women's voices and perspectives from the global southern region into the world. She served as global coordinator of the organization. The United Nations and DAWN worked together in the Asia-Pacific region under the leadership of Gigi. The work between them were published in The Future The Asia Pacific Women Want in 2015.

She worked as the departmental head of the Department of International Studies at Miriam College, working to promote women's leadership. She did important research on poverty, gender, development and the feminist movement.
