= Sima Urale =

New Zealand film director

Sima Urale is a New Zealand filmmaker. Her films explore social and political issues and have been screened worldwide. She is one of the few Polynesian film directors in the world with more than 15 years in the industry. Her accolades include the Silver Lion for Best Short Film at the Venice Film Festival for O Tamaiti (The Children) (1996).

== Personal life ==
Urale was born on the island of Savai'i, Fagamalo in Samoa. She grew up in a village with two brothers and three sisters. Her family immigrated to New Zealand in the 1970s where they lived in Wellington. Her mother was a teacher and her father, a fisherman and a planter from a village, worked night shifts in a factory. Urale's siblings are also creative in the arts and media industry: her youngest brother is a well-known rap artist, King Kapisi, and the first hip hop artist to be awarded the APRA Silver Scroll. Her sister Makerita Urale is a playwright, producer and documentary filmmaker. Another brother Tati Urale is a senior producer at ONE News, Television New Zealand. Urale has collaborated creatively with her siblings. Urale directed the King Kapisi's first music video Sub-Cranium Feeling which was produced by her sister Makerita Urale. Filmed underwater, the music video won a number of Best Music Video awards including Flying Fish, BFM and TVNZ Mai Time.

== Education ==
In 1989, Urale graduated from Toi Whakaari New Zealand Drama School where she had studied acting. She played the lead role of Ranevskaya, the matriarch in Chekov's The Cherry Orchard in the final year graduation production. After two years acting in professional theatre in New Zealand, she studied filmmaking in Australia at the Victorian College of the Arts in Melbourne. At film school, she won Student of the Year Award. In 1994, she graduated with a B.A. (Film & Television).

== Career ==
As an actor, Urale performed in professional theatre in New Zealand for two years and toured nationally in European and Māori theatre productions including The Taming of the Shrew at Downstage Theatre in Wellington and David Geary's play A Pack of Girls about a women's rugby team. In 1995, she won Best Actor in a Support Role at the Chapman Tripp Theatre Awards for her portrayal of Luisa in John Kneubuhl's classic play, Think of a Garden directed by Nathaniel Lees. In 1997 and 1999, she performed the role of Tivi in her sister Makerita Urale's vintage New Zealand play Frangipani Perfume, the first play written by a Pacific Island woman for an all female cast.

Urale has worked in the film industry for more than 15 years. She has written and directed her own films, as well as documentaries, music videos and television commercials. Her films have been screened worldwide and have received international acclaim. Her first screenplay was the short film O Tamaiti which she also directed. The producer was Kara Paewai and the film was financially backed by New Zealand Film Commission. O Tamaiti has been one of the most widely screened New Zealand films internationally and won Best Short Film at Asia Pacific Film Festival, Chicago International Film Festival and NZ Film and TV Awards.

Filmed in black and white and with barely a word of dialogue, it (O Tamaiti) showed cinema's ability to shift perceptions, if not mountains. Innovatively shot from the perspective of an 11-year-old Samoan boy called Tino, as he struggles to bring up his five siblings on a housing estate while his parents are busy making money and more babies. TIME magazine, 2005

She directed the documentary Velvet Dreams which screened on the Work of Art series on TVNZ as well as film festivals. Velvet Dreams featured the work of New Zealand artist Charles McFee a painter of kitsch velvet paintings portraying bare breasted South Seas maidens. It won Best Documentary, Golden Sheaf Award at the Yorkton Film Festival (1997) in Canada. In 2001, she wrote and directed the short film Still Life about an elderly couple dealing with euthanasia. Still Life won Best Short Film at the Montreal World Film Festival and a Special Recognition Awards at the Locarno Film Festival. She also directed Hip Hop NZ, a television documentary featuring the country's hip hop icons including Che Fu, DLT (musician) from Upper Hutt Posse and Tha Feelstyle. In 2008, she directed the short film Coffee and Allah which won a number of awards including Best Short Film at Cinema of Muslim Golden Minbar, RUSSIA. She directed the feature film Apron Strings (2008) produced by Rachel Gardner and written by Dianne Taylor and Schuchi Kothari. The film won Best Actor, Best Actress, Best Cinematography and Best Designer at the Qantas Film & TV Awards (2009).

== Awards ==
- 2022 Tautai Award for Moana Excellence in the Screen Industry at the Women in Film and Television New Zealand Awards
- 2006 Creative New Zealand Pacific Innovation & Excellence Award at the Arts Pasifika Awards
- 2004 Fulbright-Creative New Zealand Pacific Writers' Residency at the University of Hawaiʻi
- 2003 award from New Zealand On Air for contribution to music video making.

== Filmography ==
Year	Title	Credits	Awards
1996	O Tamaiti (The Children) (short film)	Director, writer	Silver Lion Best Short Film: Venice Film Festival;Silver Plaque Best Short Film: Chicago International Film Festival; Special Recognition Award: Aspen Film Festival (USA), 1996 Best Short Film:Asia Pacific Film Festival, Newport Beach Film Festival, New Zealand Film & TV Awards; Best Screenplay, Flickerfest (Australia)
1997	Velvet Dreams (documentary)	Director	Best Documentary: 1997 Golden Sheaf Award: Yorkton Film Festival (Canada)
2001	Still Life (short film)	Director, writer	2001 Best Short Film: Montreal World Film Festival, Best Director & Best Screenplay: Drifting Clouds Film Festival (NZ), Special Recognition: Locarno Film Festival (Switzerland)
2008	Coffee and Allah (short film)	Director	2008 Best Short Film: Vladivostok Film Festival (Russia), Hawaiʻi International Film Festival, Cinema of Muslim Golden Minbar (Russia), 2009 Marin County International Film Festival (USA)
2008	Apron Strings (feature film)	Director	World Premiere 2008 Toronto International Film Festival; 2009 Qantas Film & TV Awards: Best Actor, Best Actress, Best Cinematographer, Best Production Design; 2008 Women in Film & TV International: Diversity Award
