= Pacific Underground =

New Zealand performing arts collective

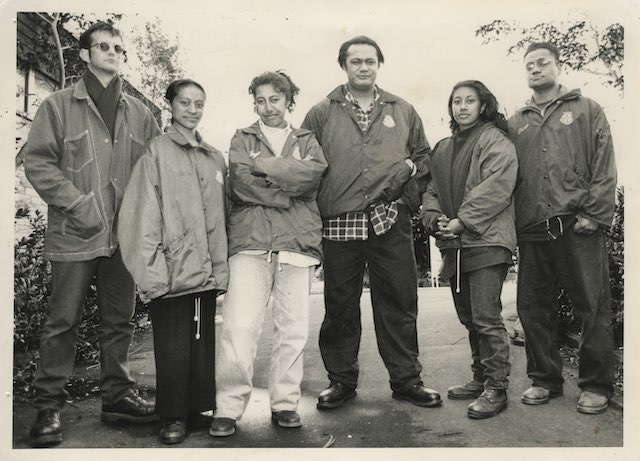
- Formation: 1993
- Type: Theatre group
- Purpose: Contemporary Pasifika theatre, music and events
- Location: New Zealand

Pacific Underground is a New Zealand performing arts collective, founded in 1993 in Christchurch, New Zealand, to produce contemporary performing art that reflects the group's Pacific Island heritage. In 2016 they received a Lifetime Achievement Award at the Pacific Music Awards. They are the longest running Pacific contemporary performing arts organisation in New Zealand.

Pacific Underground has produced plays, music, workshops and events and continues to be an active influence on performing arts culture within New Zealand. In 2018 Pacific Underground celebrated their 25th anniversary with a number of events.

== Background ==
The founding members of Pacific Underground were Mishelle Muagututi'a, Oscar Kightley, Simon Small, Erolia Ifopo and Michael Hodgson supported by Tanya Muagututi'a, Pos Mavaega and Fuarosa (Losa) Luafutu-Tamati and Vic Tamati. Their first play, Fresh Off The Boat, written by Oscar Kightley and Simon Small, was produced in 1993 at the Free Theatre. This play was groundbreaking partly because of its humour and partly because of the theme of a rift between the generations: those born in Samoa, and those born in New Zealand. Fresh Off The Boat was directed by Nathaniel Lees, who brought his experience to help shape the work. It was performed in theatres in Christchurch, Wellington and Auckland in New Zealand as well as in Samoa. It was published in 2005 by The Play Press.

Pacific Underground went on to write and tour plays during the 1990s for school audiences with a theatre-in-education focus. The best known of these plays was Romeo and Tusi by Erolia Ifopo and Oscar Kightley, which has been revived frequently. The first presentations of Romeo and Tusi were as a schools tour in 1996, after which a bigger version with a band for outdoor summer presentations was developed in 1997. In the 1990s Members of Pacific Underground tutored a school holiday programme called Culture Shock at the Christchurch youth centre.

Pacific Underground continued with theatre-in-education and producing main-stage plays. They also developed music, and in 1994 Pos Mavaega joined the group as musical director for productions. Under the name Pacific Underground Music Production (P.U.M.P.) they produced two albums, Landmark (1999) and Island Summer (2010), as well as playing at different events, and in 2016 received the Lifetime Achievement Award at the Pacific Music Awards.

Pacific Underground were an intrinsic part of the Christchurch Arts Centre with an office for many years at the Dux de Lux (a well-known live music venue). The Arts Centre was deemed unsafe following the 2011 Christchurch earthquakes and Tanya Muagututi'a and Pos Mavaega after losing their work space relocated to Auckland. In 2019 the Court Theatre presented Fresh Off The Boat by Oscar Kightley and Simon Small 25 years after its debut. Original cast member Tanya Muagututi'a directed, with one review saying of the production: "It gathers us all in and gives us an opportunity to start the conversation around Pacific people and the challenges of prejudice in an inclusive way that highlights the aspiration of New Zealanders to understand each other in our diversity and beyond our stereotypes."

The company has had many different performers, directors and production people over the years, many of whom have continued in the arts and the film and TV industry. This includes Barbara Carpenter who went to Culture Shock, the holiday programme. She says: "I found Pacific Underground, and the women in particular, to be strong, encouraging and empowered by their passion for performing and expressing themselves." Well-known New Zealand artists who started out with Pacific Underground include Oscar Kightley, David Fane, Shimpal Lelisi, who are all members of the Naked Samoans, and Bro'Town a New Zealand animated TV series. Music artists include Ladi6, Brent Park, Dallas Tamaira of Fat Freddy's Drop and rapper Scribe. Anton Carter was manager for three years starting in 1994. Pacific Underground is currently led by Tanya Muagutitui'a and Pos Mavaega.

In the 2005 issue of Spacifik magazine, feature writer Felolini Maria Ifopo asked the question: "Would Samoans be Naked or the Bros be in Town if it weren't for Pacific Underground?"

In 2025 there is a collaboration with the Christchurch Symphony Orchestra conducted by Samiu Katoa Uatahausi, called the Ōtautahi Pasifika Legacy Project.

== Productions ==
=== Theatre (selection of work) ===
- Gifted and Fresh (1993) by Oscar Kightley and Simon Small. New Zealand secondary schools national tour.
- Fresh off the Boat (1993) by Oscar Kightley and Simon Small – toured New Zealand and Samoa (1994) and Australia (1995)
- Who's the Flavour (1994) by Oscar Kightley. New Zealand secondary schools national tour.
- Absolutley Fobulous (1995) by Victor Roger. New Zealand secondary schools national tour.
- Sons (1995) by Victor Roger. Directed by Dave Fane, premiered at the Court Theatre. Published script ISBN 9781869693039
- Tatau Rites of Passage (1996) Devised by Pacific Underground and Zeal (Australia). Herald Theatre, Auckland. Bondi Pavilion, Sydney, November (1996), Pacific Wave Festival. Director: Stefo Nantsou. Cast: Anton Carter, Rob Dilley, Meg Dunn, Erolia Ifopo, Oscar Knightley, Karen Lantry, Shimpal Lelisi, Mishelle Muagututi'a, Stefo Nantsaou (q.v.), Joy Vaele; Su'a Paulo Suluape III (Tattooist), Moe Siaosi and Laga Suluape (Tattooist's assistants).
- Coconuts with Juice (1996), by Erolia Ifopo and Oscar Kightley. Primary schools tour, Auckland.
- Romeo and Tusi (1996) by Erolia Ifopo and Oscar Kightley – toured New Zealand
- Bully For You (1997) by Erolia Ifopo. New Zealand secondary schools national tour.
- Dawn Raids (1997) by Oscar Kightly – toured New Zealand
- Island Summer (2005) by Pos Mavaega
- Angels (2009) by Tanya Muagututi'a and Joy Vaele (co-production with the Court Theatre)
- Rangi and Mau's Amazing Race (2015 revival) by Tanya Muagututi'a, Joy Vaele, Ave Sua and Raniera Dallas. Auckland Matariki Festival.

=== Music ===
- Pacific Underground a.k.a. Pacific Underground Music Productions, P.U.M.P
- Landmark (1999)
- Island Summer (2005). Concert. Christchurch Arts Festival, Isaac Theatre Royal
- Island Summer (2006). Concert. Ono Pacific Arts, The Arts Centre, Christchurch
- Island Summer (2007). Concert. James Hay Theatre, Christchurch Town Hall
- Island Summer (2010). Album.

=== Events and Workshops ===
Angels (2005). Tanya Muagututi'a and Joy Vaele. Pasifika Playwrights Forum, TAPAC, Auckland.

Pacific Arts Festival – Christchurch (2001–2010) These annual festivals have included artists such as Albert Wendt, Fatu Feu'u, Adeaze, Nesian Mystik, Cydel and the Groovehouse, Tha Feelstyle, Toni Huata and Grace & Mark Vanilau.

=== Other ===
Under the Fale (2013) An installation in Christchurch in collaboration with FESTA, The Free Theatre and Auckland Unitec's School of Architecture .
