= Iosefa Enari Memorial Award =

The Iosefa Enari Memorial Award is an annual award presented by Creative New Zealand at the Arts Pasifika Awards in honour of the late Samoan opera singer Iosefa Enari.

The award recognises the contribution of the late Iosefa Enari to the arts and in particular his pioneering role in Pacific opera. This study/travel award supports the career development of individual Pacific singers in New Zealand, across all classical vocal genres and career stages.

== Recipients ==
- Joshua Pearson, composer (2022)
- Ridge Ponini, singer (2021)
- Moses Mackay, singer (2020)
- Samson Setu, singer (2019)
- Benson Wilson, singer (2018)
- Filipe Manu, singer (2017)
- Madison Nonoa, singer (2016)
- Manase Latu, singer (2015)
- Natalia Mann, harpist (2013)
- Marlena Devoe (2011)
- Pene Junior Pati (2010)
- Elisha Na’otala Fa’I (2009)
- James Ioelu (2008)
- Sani Muamaseali’i (2007)
- Aivale Cole (2006)
- Ramonda Taleni (2005)
- Bonadventure Allan – Moetaua (2004)
- Daphne Collins (2003)
- Ben Makisi (2002)
