= Gabriel Reid =

New Zealand actor

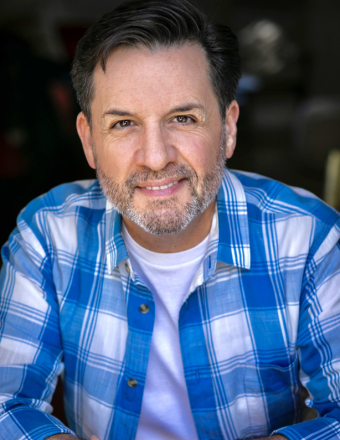
- Born: 24 February 1969 (age 57); Auckland, New Zealand
- Education: Post-Graduate Diploma, BA, MA, PhD
- Alma mater: University of Auckland
- Occupations: Director, writer, educator
- Years active: 1979–present

Academic background
- Thesis: The Impact of Digital Technologies on Feature Film Production (2007)

Dr Gabriel Luke Reid (born 24 February 1969) is a New Zealand writer, director, producer and educator whose work spans theatre, television, film and academia. His work has received recognition from organisations including Tropfest, Promax, the New Zealand Cinematographers Society and the New Zealand Writers Guild. He holds a PhD in Film, Television and Media Studies from the University of Auckland.

== Education ==
Reid's doctoral thesis, titled The Impact of Digital Technologies on Feature Film Production, examines the development and application of digital film production technologies, primarily in mainstream American cinema. It includes case studies of The Lord of the Rings and The Chronicles of Narnia, considered both for their role in advancing digital production techniques and for their positioning between local (New Zealand) and global production. Additional case studies examine fully computer-generated animated features and live-action productions captured digitally.

Reid conducted research at Animal Logic, Blue Sky Studios, Industrial Light & Magic, Park Road Post, Pixar and Weta Digital. His interviewees included Andrew Adamson, Matt Aitken, Pete Docter, Bill George, Donald McAlpine, Tim Johnson, Barrie M. Osborne, Chris Wedge and Dean Wright.

Prior to completing his doctorate, Reid earned a Bachelor of Arts and Master of Arts (First Class Honours). His MA thesis, titled Mr. Shakespeare Goes to Hollywood and supervised by Professor MacDonald P. Jackson, examines film adaptations of works by Shakespeare. Conducting research at the Royal Shakespeare Company, Royal National Theatre and Renaissance Films, Reid interviewed notable directors, educators, actors and producers, including John Barton, Hugh Cruttwell, Adrian Noble, Trevor Nunn, David Parfitt and Imogen Stubbs.

In 2025, Reid completed a Postgraduate Diploma in Teaching (Secondary) through The Teachers' Institute, following a full-year school-based teaching placement at Auckland Grammar School. He has taught English at Auckland Grammar School and lectured on Film History and New Zealand Cinema at Unitec Institute of Technology. He currently teaches English and Media Studies at Onehunga High School.

== Career ==
As a grandson of Mercury Theatre founder Professor John Reid, Reid's interest in the performing arts was nurtured from an early age. Before he was a teenager, he secured representation with New Zealand's first professional talent agency, founded by former wrestler Robert Bruce. Reid acted on stage and television alongside artists such as Deryck Guyler, Billy T. James, George Henare and Ray Woolf, including in productions of Oliver!, directed by Simon Phillips, and Hans Christian Andersen.

At Auckland Grammar he was president of the Senior Film Society and a member of Bel Canto choir, led by David Hamilton. At sixteen he directed a season of Godspell. In his early 20s, his work as a theatre director and designer received critical attention. Of his production of Amadeus, The New Zealand Herald wrote: "The multi-talented Mr Reid...directs with scrupulous care and refreshing confidence." Reviewing his production of The Crucible, The Strip magazine wrote: "Gabriel Reid is a clever, tightly disciplined, diligent director, with a bold and clear eye for design. This totally satisfying production coaxed new subtleties from the script — which could become far too dramatic for its own good in the hands of a less questioning director — yet diluted none of its power. It was craft and precision that fused this production into an example which could inspire even more experienced directors."

As vice-chair of Theatre Workshop, Reid oversaw productions of Salome, The Revenger's Tragedy and As You Like It, which featured Toa Fraser, Oliver Driver and Rajeev Varma. He was invited to join the staff of Auckland Metropolitan Opera (now New Zealand Opera) for the company's inaugural production, Die Fledermaus starring Dame Malvina Major at the newly opened Aotea Centre. Over a period of several years he worked on numerous opera seasons, including productions featuring Dame Kiri Te Kanawa and Sir Donald McIntyre.

In 1999, Reid founded Pageant Films. The company produced a substantial volume of promotional spots, network idents and other broadcast material for New Zealand broadcasters including TVNZ, MediaWorks and their subsidiary networks. Reid's work received industry recognition, winning Gold at Promax Australia and has featured notable performers including Temuera Morrison, Karl Urban, Robyn Malcolm, Angela Bloomfield and Oscar Kightley.

Reid later worked as an assistant director and production assistant on television and film projects, including Hercules: The Legendary Journeys, Bridge to Terabithia, The Chronicles of Narnia and Kiwi Christmas. As an actor he has appeared in television series and films, including Shortland Street, Street Legal, Jackson's Wharf, Outrageous Fortune, We're Here To Help and American Playboy: The Hugh Hefner Story.

His 2004 short film, As Dreams Are Made On starring Raymond Hawthorne, was invited to screen at Rhode Island International Film Festival, Melbourne International Film Festival and the New Zealand International Film Festival. His 2015 short film, Every Moment, won four awards at Tropfest N.Z., including Best Film and Best Actress (Bree Peters). Reid and his writing partner, Maile Daugherty, based the screenplay on a portmanteau play by Tom Sainsbury, Hotel. It was awarded Best Short Film Screenplay at the New Zealand Writers Guild Awards, the SWANZ. The short was nominated in three categories at the New Zealand Film Awards.

In 2019, the New Zealand Film Commission awarded Reid a Catalyst He Kauahi grant, supporting feature film development via the production of a narrative proof-of-concept short. The grant was applied to Impossible, written and directed by Reid, produced by Karpal Singh and Belindalee Hope, starring Paul Norell and Diamond Langi. Post-produced at Sir Peter Jackson's Park Road Post, the short was mixed by two-time Academy Award winner Michael Hedges. At its 2023 ceremony, the New Zealand Cinematographers Society (NZCS) awarded Gold to director of photography Andrew McGeorge for his work on Impossible. In 2025, Reid undertook a New Zealand Film Commission director attachment on Moss & Freud. In October 2026, Impossible began streaming across Australia via SBS On Demand.

Reid has held industry governance roles. Commencing in 2012, he served ten years on the board of the Directors and Editors Guild of Aotearoa New Zealand (DEGANZ), including two terms as vice president. From 2017, he served five years on the board of Film Auckland Incorporated (FAI). He has occasionally commented publicly on issues relating to the New Zealand screen industry.
