= 2000 Nokia New Zealand Film Awards =

2000/1/1 film awards

- Awarded for: Excellence in New Zealand film
- Sponsored by: Nokia
- Date: July 1, 2000
- Location: St James Theatre, Wellington
- Country: New Zealand
- Presented by: New Zealand Academy of Film and Television Arts

The 2000 Nokia New Zealand Film Awards were held on Saturday 1 July 2000 at the St James Theatre in Wellington, New Zealand. The awards were presented by the New Zealand Academy of Film and Television Arts and sponsored by Nokia New Zealand. This year saw the introduction of the $5000 Nokia New Zealand Film Awards Scholarship.

== Nominees and winners ==
Prizes were awarded in 19 categories with two special prizes - the Rudall Hayward Award (lifetime achievement) and the Nokia NZ Filmmaker's Scholarship. Student thriller Scarfies dominated the awards, winning six out of its 12 nominated categories.

=== Feature films ===
Best Film

- Scarfies, Lisa Chatfield
  - Savage Honeymoon, Steve Sachs
  - The Price of Milk, Fiona Copland

Best Director

- Robert Sarkies, Scarfies
  - Mark Beesley, Savage Honeymoon
  - Vanessa Alexander, Magik and Rose

Best Actor

- Cliff Curtis, Jubilee
  - Karl Urban, The Price of Milk
  - Taika Cohen, Scarfies

Best Actress

- Willa O'Neill, Scarfies
  - Danielle Cormack, The Price of Milk
  - Alison Bruce, Magik & Rose

Best Supporting Actor

- Jon Brazier, Scarfies
  - Hori Ahipene, Jubilee
  - Scott Wills, Hopeless

Best Supporting Actress

- Elizabeth Hawthorne, Savage Honeymoon
  - Sophia Hawthorne, Savage Honeymoon
  - Ashleigh Seagar, Scarfies

Best Juvenile Performer

- Olivia Tennet, Kids World
  - Morgan Hubbard-Palmer, Wild Blue

Best Screenplay

- Duncan Sarkies, Robert Sarkies, Scarfies
  - Mark Beesley, Savage Honeymoon
  - Michael Bennett, Jubilee
  - Vanessa Alexander, Magik & Rose

Best Cinematography

- Leon Narbey, The Price of Milk
  - Leon Narbey, Jubilee
  - Stephen Downes, Scarfies

Best Editing

- Annie Collins, Scarfies
  - Margot Francis, Savage Honeymoon
  - Cushla Dillon, The Price of Milk

Best Original Music

- Dean Savage, Savage Honeymoon
  - Plan 9, Jubilee
  - Victoria Kelly, Magik & Rose

Best Contribution to a Soundtrack

- John McKay, Jubilee
  - Chris Burt, Savage Honeymoon
  - Chris Burt, Scarfies

Best Design

- Gary Mackay, Savage Honeymoon
  - Gaylene Barnes, Scarfies

Best Costume Design

- Emily Carter, Savage Honeymoon
  - Amanda Neale, Scarfies

Best Makeup

- Denise Kum, Savage Honeymoon
  - Deirdre Haworth, Wild Blue

=== Short films ===
Best Short Film

- Infection (James Cunningham, Director)
  - The Painted Lady (Belinda Schmid, Director)

Best Performance in a Short Film

- Sara Wiseman, Letters About The Weather
  - Elizabeth Morris, The Painted Lady
  - Scott Wills, Ouch

Best Script, Short Film

- Jesse Warn, Little Samurai
  - Reuben Pollock & Peter Salmon, Letters About The Weather

Best Craft Contribution to Short Film

- James Cunningham, CGI Creation & Animation, Infection
  - Aaron Morton, Director of Photograph, Little Samurai
  - Eric de Beus & Neil Pardington Editors, Losing Sleep

=== Special awards ===
Rudall Hayward Award (Lifetime Achievement Award)

- Ian Mune

Nokia NZ Filmmaker's Scholarship

- Reina Webster
