= Paul McLaughlin (actor) =

New Zealand actor

- Occupation: Actor
- Years active: 1997-present
- Spouse: Carrie McLaughlin

Paul McLaughlin is a New Zealand actor who won the Cloud 9 award for Actor of the Year in 2004. He works out of Wellington, New Zealand, where he lives with his wife—singer, foley-artist and actress, Carrie McLaughlin.

== Career ==
McLaughlin graduated from Toi Whakaari: New Zealand Drama School in 1996 with a Diploma in Acting. McLaughlin has had roles in the TV series Jackson's Wharf, as Brian Peek, and Seven Periods with Mr Gormsby, as Principal Roger Dasent. He has also had guest roles in numerous other television series and in film - including The Lord of the Rings.

In 2006 he founded site-specific.co.nz, a devising theatre company. The first play was Hotel, a show for 12 audience members at a time set in a real, luxury hotel suite. The company went on to complete a trilogy of works, adding "Salon" and "Cafe" to complete The Hotel Trilogy.

His stage credits number over 100 productions and include "Albert Speer", "Kings of the Gym", The Love of Humankind, "The Bach", Drawer of Knives, Peninsula and Te Karakia.. Paul has also directed extensively including several Summer Shakespeare's and award-winning seasons at theatres around New Zealand.

In 2004 he won the Chapman Tripp Theatre Award for Actor of the Year for the title role in Albert Speer.

Since 2023 Paul has worked with Taki Rua Productions, as General Manager and more recently as Producer.

== Filmography ==
=== Film ===
Year	Title	Role	Notes
2004	Futile Attraction	Pete	

=== Television ===
Year	Title	Role	Notes
1997	Duggan	Steve Lynch	"Death in Paradise"
1998	The Legend of William Tell	Brodam	"The Challenge" (S01E06)
1999-2000	Jackson's Wharf	Brian Peek	Main role
1999	A Twist in the Tale	Watson	"A Matter of Time" (S01E15)
2002	Revelations – The Initial Journey	Bill	"A Dream of Flying" (S01E02)
2002	The Strip	Richard	"The Farewell F***" (S01E06)
2003	The Strip	Waiter	"Once Bitten" (S02E09)
2004	The Insider's Guide To Happiness	John	"Is Happiness an Accident?" (S01E01) "Who Controls Your Happiness?" (S01E02) "What Are You Afraid Of?" (S01E04) "Who Taught You to Be Happy?" (S01E09)
2005-2006	Seven Periods with Mr Gormsby	Roger Dasent	Main role
2006	The Lost Children	John Melville	Episode 13
2006	The Killian Curse	Jack Snr	"The Beginning" (S01E01)
2009	Legend of the Seeker	Captain Arturis	"Broken" (S02E03)

=== Theatre ===
Co-starred in the show "Me and Robert McKee". The show debuted November 2010 at Wellington theater Circa.

Paul plays Mac a disgruntled banker who, after running up millions of dollars of debt, devises a plan to get out. Paul uses his writer friend Billy to raise $250,000 in funding for a film. He then leaves his wife and runs away with the money.
