= Dave Armstrong (playwright) =

New Zealand playwright

- Born: 1961; New Zealand
- Occupation: Playwright

Dave Armstrong (born 1961) is a New Zealand playwright, screenwriter, trumpet player and columnist for The Dominion Post. His work has featured on stage, radio and television. His television writer credits include Spin Doctors, Seven Periods with Mr Gormsby, Great War Stories, and script editor for bro'Town.

Armstrong states:

Just about everything I have learnt about literary and dramatic structure has a parallel in classical music composition. Good dialogue has a rhythm, so if you have a musical ear you can hear it when it works.

== Niu Sila ==
In 2004 Dave Armstrong and Oscar Kightley co-wrote the play Niu Sila, about the friendship between a Samoan and a Palagi boy in 1960s New Zealand. It premiered at Downstage Theatre, and went on to win the 2004 Chapman Tripp Theatre Award for Best New New Zealand Play. In 2006 Armstrong and Oscar Kightley received the Arts Foundation of New Zealand Award for Patronage, for Niu Sila which they co-wrote. In her New Zealand Listener review of the Auckland Theatre Company production, Natasha Hay called Niu Sila "a triumph." The original "two-hander" play Niu Sila, which is written for 2 actors to play 24 characters, is published by Playmarket, and The Tutor is published in the same book. In 2007 Armstrong and Kightley adapted the play for schools, so that it can be performed with a large cast. The schools' version was published in 2007 by the New Zealand branch of Cengage Learning, and features study resources and drama activities. Niu Sila is one of the prescribed plays for NCEA (NZ) Level 3 Assessment.

== Cloverton: In Love & In Wine ==
In November 2022, The Queen's Closet performed Cloverton: In Love & In Wine, a work that blended the music of Henry Purcell with a contemporary story written by Dave Armstrong especially for the performance. The work follows a tradition from the Restoration period of mixing spoken drama with operatic music.

== List of plays ==
- 1998 - A Christmas Carol
- 1998 – Nitwits
- 2004 – Niu Sila, co-written with Oscar Kightley
- 2005 – King and Country
- 2007 – The Tutor
- 2008 – RPM
- 2008 – Where We Once Belonged, adapted from the novel by Sia Figiel
- 2009 – Le Sud
- 2009 – Kia ora Khalid
- 2011 – The Motor Camp, based on a story by director Danny Mulheron
- 2011 – Rita and Douglas
- 2012 – Magnolia Street
- 2013 – Kings of the Gym
- 2015 – Central
- 2015 - Anzac Eve
- 2020 - The Surprise Party

== Awards ==
- 1995 – New Zealand Film and Television Awards – nominated, Best Television Script – Drama/Comedy, Skitz
- 2003 – New Zealand Television Awards – winner, Best Script – Comedy, Spin Doctors, Series 3
- 2004 – Chapman Tripp Theatre Awards, winner Best New New Zealand Play, Niu Sila
- 2005 – Chapman Tripp Theatre Awards, winner Best New New Zealand Play, The Tutor
- 2006 – Air New Zealand Screen Awards – nominated, Best Script – Comedy, Seven Periods with Mister Grimsby
- 2006 – Arts Foundation Award for Patronage (co-awarded with Oscar Kightley)
- 2008 – Chapman Tripp Theatre Awards, winner Best New New Zealand Play, Where We Once Belonged
- 2008 – Radio Awards, Best Dramatic Production, King and Country
- 2014 – SWANZ Scriptwriter Awards - nominated for Best Television Drama Episode for Hope and Wire, Episode Five
