= Auckland Theatre Company =

Auckland's premier professional theatre company

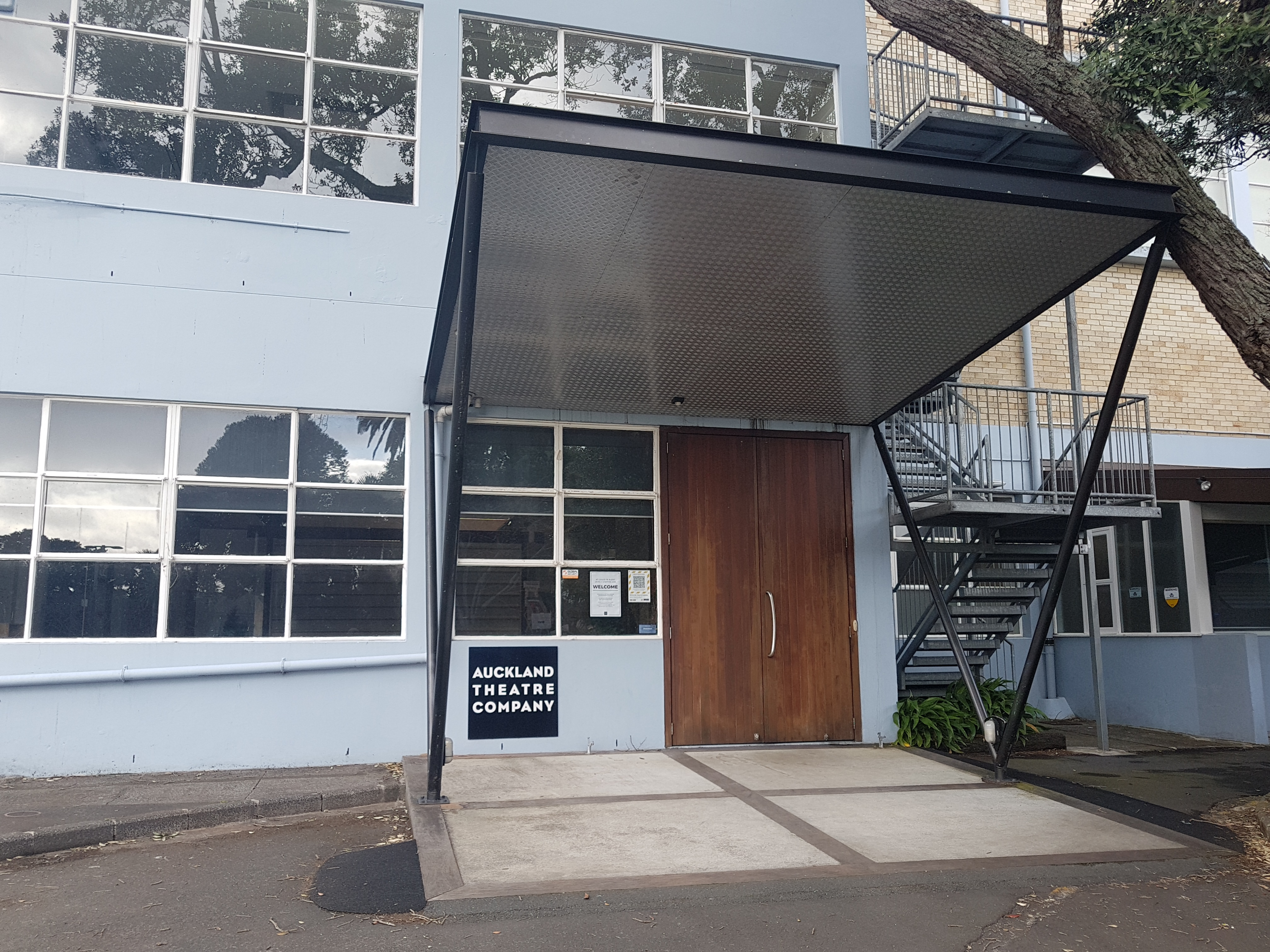
Auckland Theatre Company office

Auckland Theatre Company (ATC) is a professional theatre company in Auckland. It was founded in 1992 and since 2016 has been based in ASB Waterfront Theatre in the Wynyard Quarter in central Auckland.

== History ==
Auckland Theatre Company (ATC) was established following the bankruptcy of Mercury Theatre Company, Auckland's original professional theatre company which had been the largest subsidised company in the country. Founding Artistic Director was Simon Prast who was there from March 1992 until February 2003. In his time he directed and produced over 60 plays.

The first season presented by ATC was in 1993. The season consisted of two New Zealand plays. The first play produced by ATC was Lovelock’s Dream Run, written by David Geary and Directed by Raymond Hawthorne. The first international work produced by ATC was presented in 1994; a production of Angels in America, written by Tony Kushner, and directed by Raymond Hawthorne. Raymond Hawthorne also directed the first musical produced by ATC, Kander and Ebb's Cabaret.

Before the opening the ASB Waterfront Theatre, ATC presented their shows in many venues around Auckland. The most-used venues were the Kenneth Maidment Theatre (commonly known as The Maidment) in the Auckland University campus and the Sky City Theatre. Other theatres ATC performed in were Q Theatre, Civic Theatre, Herald Theatre and the Basement Theatre.

== About ==
=== Mainstage Season ===
Auckland Theatre Company offices are located in the lower ground floor of the Mt Eden War Memorial Hall in Balmoral, New Zealand. ATC refit the space to include their administration offices, box office and two rehearsal spaces and moved to this Dominion Road space from Quay Street in December 2010.

In 2020 the Auckland Theatre Company presented an on-line production during the COVID-19 lock down, using the device of a Zoom meeting for the stage. It was adapted by Eli Kent and Eleanor Bishop, who also directed it, with rehearsals and performances carried out online.

Auckland Theatre Company has presented co-productions with numerous other organisations, including Auckland Arts Festival, Te Rēhia Theatre Company, Prayas, Proudly Asian Theatre, Pacific Underground and Hāpai Productions. For example in 2022 the play Scenes from a Yellow Peril written by Nathan Joe and directed by Jane Yonge was co-produced with SquareSums&Co and Oriental Maidens. Scenes from a Yellow Peril was about exoticisation and prejudice of East Asians living in New Zealand, made by East Asian artists. Joe says the benefit of the co-production for 'ATC, which is predominantly Pākehā', was it was able to trust relevant communities will be able to inform the work.

=== Creative Learning and Youth Arts ===
Auckland Theatre Company runs a creative learning and youth arts unit.

=== Staffing ===
ATC have about 30 staff in leadership, production, marketing and administration. The creative teams and casts for production come in on contract.

After Simon Prast’s departure in February 2003, Oliver Driver stepped in as the interim-Artistic Director until the role of Artistic Director was taken over by Colin McColl. McColl held the role until 2021. Jonathan Bielski who has been on staff as CEO since 2019 has been the Artistic Director since 2021, seeing through McColl’s final season. Bielski’s programming began from 2022.

Since November 2008, Philippa Campbell has been the ATC's Literary Manager.

== ASB Waterfront Theatre ==
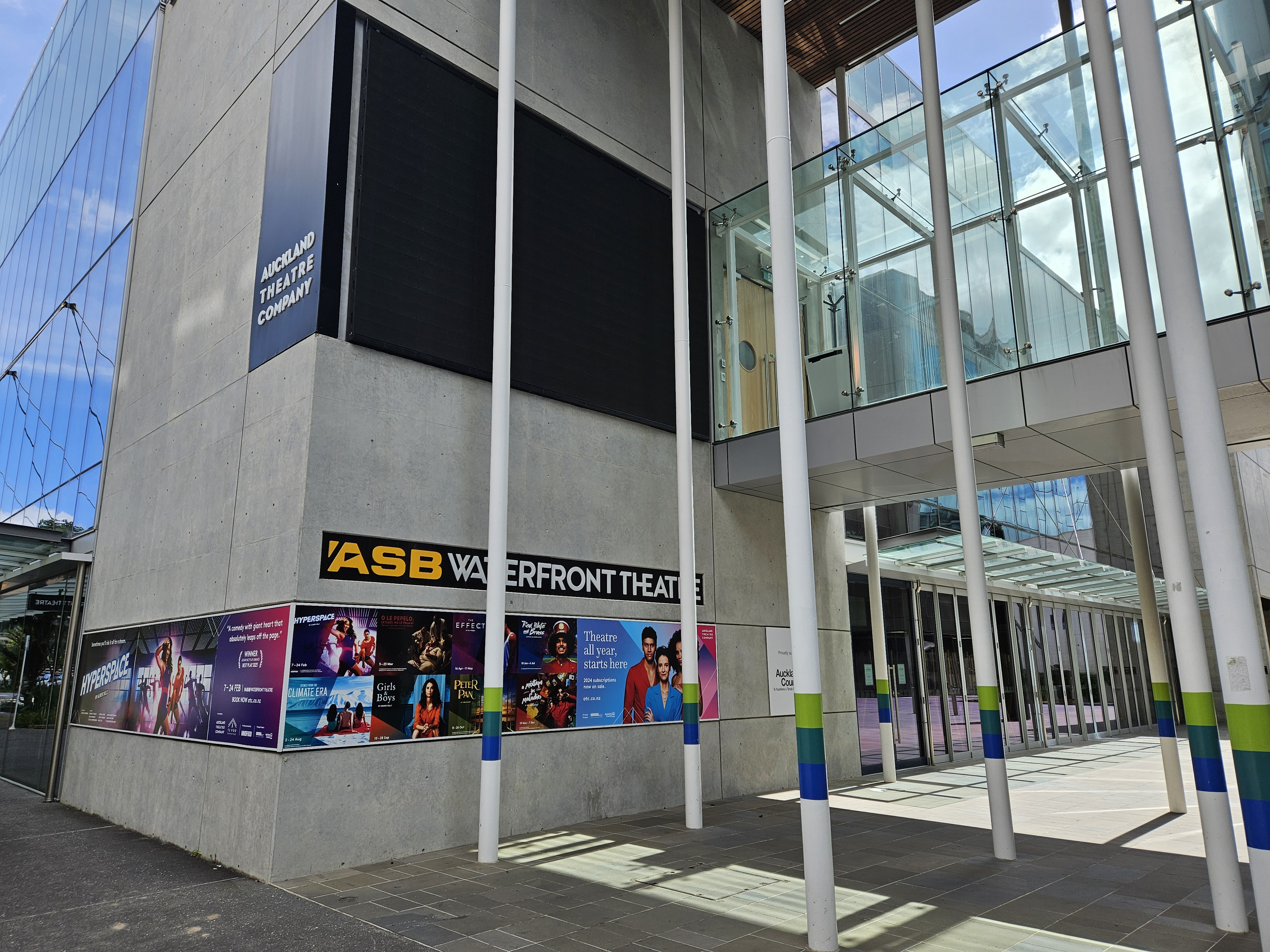
ASB Waterfront Theatre in Wynyard Quarter

In September 2016, Auckland Theatre Company opened a purpose built 660-seat performing arts venue, the ASB Waterfront Theatre located in the Wynyard Quarter. Auckland Theatre Company and Eke Panuku Development Auckland were project partners. Other contributions are the Foundation Partners Auckland Council, ASB Bank and AUT University. Major funders include Creative New Zealand and Foundation North. The project funders are the Edmiston Trust, The Lion Foundation and Lotto NZ. The Founding Corporate Partners are Kensington Swan and Villa Maria, and Platinum Corporate Partners are Cooper and Company, ECC Limited, and Moller Architects.

The premier show presented in the ASB Waterfront Theatre was the Auckland Theatre Company production of Billy Elliot the Musical, presented by ASB. The first preview was on October 7, 2016, and the official opening was on October 13, 2016.

The ASB Waterfront Theatre space is also a venue for hire, with other users including Auckland Arts Festival, Pacific Dance New Zealand, Tempo Dance Festival, New Zealand Opera, New Zealand International Film Festival and touring international productions. The venue is also used as a space for hire for conferences, onstage dinners, awards nights and graduation ceremonies the Villa Maria Gallery is a secondary function space.

The ASB Waterfront Theatre was the recipient of Small Venue of the Year in 2018 presented by EVANZ.
