= Alistair Browning =

New Zealand actor (1954–2019)

Alistair James Browning
- Born: 8 February 1954; Dunedin, New Zealand
- Died: 2 June 2019 (aged 65); Palmerston North, New Zealand
- Occupations: Actor, director, producer, writer
- Years active: 1977–2019

Alistair Browning (8 February 1954 – 2 June 2019) was a New Zealand actor who won several awards for his work in film, television and theatre, best known for his roles in Merry Christmas, Mr. Lawrence, The Lord of the Rings, Rain, Futile Attraction, Siege, and Power Rangers Dino Super Charge.

== Life and career ==
Browning regularly appeared in live professional theatre in New Zealand. He started his career at The Mercury Theatre in Auckland, New Zealand, in 1977 as an intern, immersing himself in all aspects of theatre, including stage management, lighting, sound and special effects operation, set construction, costuming as well as acting. In 1980 he joined the Court Theatre company, playing Hamlet among many other roles and continued to work there and throughout New Zealand in a wide variety of genres from modern comedy to Classical. In 1981, he joined the core cast of Australian soap opera The Sullivans, and afterwards worked often in Australia in theatre, film and television. He also performed in England at The Yvonne Arnaud, Old Vic and Shakespeare's Globe theatres.

He met award-winning musician David Bowie while filming for the movie Merry Christmas, Mr Lawrence; after Bowie's death in 2016, Browning told Stuff.co.nz about his experience.

He won Best Supporting Actor in a Feature Film at the 2001 Nokia New Zealand Film Awards for his role in Rain.

Browning died from cancer on 2 June 2019, at the age of 65.

== Partial filmography ==
=== Acting ===
Year	Title	Role	Notes	Ref(s)
1981	The Sullivans	Ray Kirk		
1983	Merry Christmas, Mr. Lawrence	De Jong		
1984	Second Time Lucky	Technician 1		
1986	Windrider	Cram		
1989	Gloss	Paul Harper		
1990	Shark in the Park	Steven		
1991	The End of the Golden Weather	Robin Hood		
1992; 2001; 2014	Shortland Street	Barry Harrison; Felix Bentley; Colin Adams		
1992	Marlin Bay	Paul Richmond		
1992	Homeward Bound	Dr. McIntyre		
1997	Duggan	Simon Doyle		
1998	Hercules: The Legendary Journeys	Bronagh		
1999	Young Hercules	Real Skouras		
1999	Xena: Warrior Princess	King Melos		
2000	Jackson's Wharf	Craig Royal		
2000	Vertical Limit	Ali		
2001	Rain	Ed	Winner - Best Supporting Actor	
2002	The Lord of the Rings: The Two Towers	Damrod		
2002	Street Legal	Adrian Dunstan		
2003	The Strip	Cameron		
2003	Power Rangers Ninja Storm	Jake Brooks		
2003	The Lord of the Rings: The Return of the King	Damrod		
2004	Fracture	Gordon Peet		
2004	Futile Attraction	Dudley Earnsworth		
2004	Not Only But Always	Blake Edwards		
2005	The Adventures of Spectacularman			
2005	Luella Miller	Craig		
2005	US	Man	Short film	
2012	Siege	Inspector Mike O'Leary		
2012	The Calling		Short film for NZ Film School	
2013	Shopping	Terry		
2014	Restoration		Short film	
2014	The Brokenwood Mysteries			
2015	Mahana	Merv Williams		
2016	American Playboy: The Hugh Hefner Story	Judge Mathovic		

=== Voiceover ===
Year	Title	Role	Notes	Ref(s)
2004	Power Rangers Dino Thunder	Pollinator		
2005	Power Rangers S.P.D.	Green Monster		
2016	Power Rangers Dino Super Charge	Zenowing Dino Charge Silver Ranger		
