= Jubilee (Solomon novel) =

1994 book by Nepi Solomon

- First edition cover
- Author: Nepi Solomon
- Language: English
- Publisher: Tandem Press
- Publication date: 1994
- Publication place: New Zealand
- Pages: 184
- ISBN: 978-0-908-88440-7
- OCLC: 31049126

Jubilee is a 1994 novel by pseudonymous author Nepi Solomon, published by Tandem Press. Set in small town New Zealand, it follows the story of Billy Williams, a likeable man who is lumbered with the task of organising the local school's 75th jubilee despite his reputation for being ineffectual, and his tenuous marriage to his wife Pauline, who is questioning her life choices.

Jubilee received positive reviews upon being published. The novel was adapted for the film Jubilee (2000) directed by Michael Hurst. A second edition, featuring the movie poster as its cover, was published in 2000.

== Background ==
Jubilee was written in Auckland, New Zealand by an anonymous author who took the pseudonym Nepi Solomon. Bob Ross of Tandem Press helped publish the book, but refused to disclose Solomon's identity, as did fellow novelist Yvonne Kalman who acted as Solomon's agent.

Kalman claims she received a letter from Solomon, who stated they were serving a short prison sentence at Auckland Prison, and wanted advice on how to write after being inspired by The Snapper, a 1990 novel by Roddy Doyle. Solomon allegedly sent unsolicited pieces of written work, which convinced her to help assemble and polish it. However, some have questioned the legitimacy of this claim, arguing the book is written too precisely to simply be an amalgamated, amateur debut.

== Plot summary ==
Jubilee is set in the fictional small town of Waimatua. Billy Williams is chosen to chair the local school's 75th jubilee, but those who know him have little faith he can get it done. His wife, Pauline, is already frustrated at the jobs that need doing around the house which are never finished, and expects their family will end up dealing with the work. She's also of the view she needs more out of life and wants to expand her horizons. The book follows the planning and eventual outcome of the jubilee as Billy tries to prove himself, as well as its effect on the town and its locals, including his relationship with Pauline.

== Film adaption ==
John Barnett of South Pacific Pictures bought the rights to adapt the book into a film of the same name, Jubilee (2000). It was directed by Michael Hurst and starred Cliff Curtis and Theresea Healey as Billy and Pauline Williams. The screenplay was developed by Michael Bennet; Solomon did not participate in the production, and producer Bill Gavin claims the crew did not meet Solomon.

The film was received positively in New Zealand and won Curtis Best Actor at the 2000 Nokia New Zealand Film Awards, but it was commercially unsuccessful and saw limited international release. A DVD for the UK/Europe and Australasian region market was released in 2003 and 2004, respectively.
