= Alistair Paterson =

New Zealand poet and writer

Alistair Paterson ONZM
- Born: 1929 (age 96–97); Nelson, New Zealand
- Education: Nelson College
- Occupations: Editor, writer, poet
- Writing career
- Notable awards: 1982 John Cowie Reid Award for longer poems 1993 Katherine Mansfield Award for short stories

Alistair Ian Hughes Paterson ONZM (born 1929) is a New Zealand writer and poet. A long-time editor of the literary journal Poetry New Zealand, Paterson was appointed an Officer of the New Zealand Order of Merit, for services to literature, in the 2006 Queen's Birthday Honours.

== History ==
Paterson was born in Nelson, New Zealand in 1929. He received his education from Nelson College (1943–47), Christchurch Teachers' College, and Victoria University of Wellington and earned a Bachelor of Arts degree and Diploma of Education. In the 1970s, Paterson served as a naval officer at the Devonport Naval Base, the home of the Royal New Zealand Navy. In 1982, Paterson was a joint winner of Auckland University's John Cowie Reid Memorial Award for longer poems. In 1993, one of Paterson's short stories earned him the Bank of New Zealand Katherine Mansfield Award, which was established in 1959 to help new and established New Zealand authors achieve recognition and promote writing. In 1994, Paterson published the novel, How to be a Millionaire by Next Wednesday. Around that time, he became editor of Poetry New Zealand, a literary journal.

In 2001, Paterson chose, as the featured poet in Poetry New Zealand, Pooja Mittal, whom he described as a genius and "the best young poet of all." In December of that year, Paterson hosted a "poetry and champagne" event at the French Embassy in Wellington. The event was Paterson's way of marking the 50th anniversary of Poetry New Zealand, the literary journal then edited by Paterson. Paterson also chose the French Embassy as a way of promoting 23 November issue of the journal which featured work by French poets such as Jacques Darras. In 2003, New Zealand poet and critic Iain Sharp said of Paterson's work with Poetry New Zealand, "Since 1993 he has edited Poetry NZ magazine, tirelessly sending advice to dozens of actual and would-be contributors. I doubt if any other New Zealand editor has been quite so generous with his or her time." That same year, Paterson published Summer on the Côte d'Azur, a collection of social and political observation, and romantic theme poems written by Paterson between 1987 and 2003. By 2004, Paterson had opened a Poetry NZ office in Palm Springs, California. At that time, it was the only New Zealand literary journal with an overseas office.

In the 2006 Queen's Birthday Honours, Paterson was appointed an Officer of the New Zealand Order of Merit, for services to literature. In 2008, Paterson published the long poem Africa. Paterson's conversation with American poet Robert Creeley appeared in broadsheet: new new zealand poetry, no. 3, May 2009.

In 2017, Paterson published a non-fiction work in the UK, Passant: A Journey to Elsewhere, which "relates the experience of growing up against the background of the Great Depression and the Second World War, in a family torn apart by tragedy..."

== Awards ==
- 1982 Auckland University's John Cowie Reid Memorial Award for longer poems (joint winner)
- 1993 Bank of New Zealand's Katherine Mansfield Memorial Award for short stories

== Selected publications ==
1960s

- Caves in the Hills: Selected Poems, Pegasus Press, 1965

1970s

- Birds Flying: Poems, Pegasus Press, 1973
- Cities & Strangers, Caveman Press, 1976
- The Toledo Room: A Poem for Voices, Pilgrims South Press, 1978

1980s

- The New Poetry: Considerations Towards Open Form, Pilgrims South Press, 1981
- Qu'appelle, Pilgrims South Press, 1982
- Odysseus Rex, Auckland University Press, 1986
- Incantations for Warriors, Earl of Seacliff, Art Workshop, 1987

1990s

- How to be a Millionaire by Next Wednesday, David Ling, 1994

2000s

- Summer on the Côte d'Azur, HeadworX Publishers, 2003
- Africa, Kabbo, Mantis and the Porcupine's Daughter, Puriri Press, 2008

2010s

- broadsheet: new new zealand poetry no. 6, featuring the poetry of Alistair Paterson, ed. Mark Pirie, The Night Press, 2010
- Passant: A Journey to Elsewhere, Austin Macauley Publishers Ltd, 2017
- Poetry New Zealand Yearbook 2018, featuring the poetry of Alistair Paterson, ed. Jack Ross, Massey University Press, 2018
