= Simon Prast =

New Zealand actor and director (born 1962)

- Born: 6 March 1962 (age 64); Ōtāhuhu, Auckland, New Zealand
- Occupation: Actor
- Years active: 1987–present

Simon Prast is a director and actor from Auckland, New Zealand. Prast was the founder of the Auckland Theatre Company and director of the first Auckland Festival AK03.

== Early life ==
Prast grew up in Otara and Waikowhai, Auckland. He was educated at Waikowhai Primary, King's School and Auckland Grammar School. He holds a Law Degree (LLB) from the University of Auckland and is a graduate of Theatre Corporate.

== Career ==
=== Theatre ===
Prast performed at both the Downstage in Wellington and Mercury theatres in Auckland after graduating from the Theatre Corporate Drama School in 1984. He made his professional debut opposite Michael Hurst in Theatre Corporate's 1985 production of Torch Song Trilogy.

After founding the Auckland Theatre Company in 1992 and being its first Director from March 1992 – February 2003 he produced and / or directed over sixty mainbill productions including The Graduate, The Rocky Horror Show, Haruru Mai, The Daylight Atheist, Hair, Death of a Salesman, Wit, Art, Closer, The Judas Kiss, A Streetcar Named Desire and 12 Angry Men.

Prast's production of 12 Angry Men was named 'Production of the Decade' by the theatre's subscribers.

=== Film and television ===
Prast made his television debut in 1983 in the New Zealand drama series Mortimer's Patch. In 1987 he returned to television, appearing as Alistair Redfern in the New Zealand soap opera Gloss. In 1992 he starred in the drama movie about the French terrorist attack on a Greenpeace boat in Auckland Harbour in 1985. The Sinking of the Rainbow Warrior also starred Sam Neill and Jon Voight. He appeared as Nurse Paul Churchill on several episodes of the soap opera Shortland Street (1995–1996). Prast was a co-star in the 1998 New Zealand movie, When Love Comes Along, with Rena Owen and Dean O'Gorman, directed by Garth Maxwell.

He has appeared in several other series, and from 2010–12 guest-starred as Jeffrey Duff in Go Girls. In 2022, he played Maxine's father / The Televangelist in the slasher film X, before reprising the role in its 2024 sequel MaXXXine.

=== Auckland Festival ===
Prast organised the first Auckland Festival, which was marketed as AK03, a biennial arts and cultural festival. The festival is a celebration of the distinct and unique nature of Auckland and in particular the Pacific influence.

=== Other television appearances ===
In 1988 Prast joined TV star Jay Laga'aia as co-host for the first Coca-Cola 24-hour Music Weekend. In 1988 he also performed on the Telethon, alongside EastEnders star Letitia Dean and Dalvanius Prime with the Pātea Māori Club. In the same programme, he performed "I'm Glad I'm Not a Kennedy" with Shona Laing.

In 1998, on the TV arts programme Backchat (hosted by Bill Ralston), Prast debated local politician Craig Little for an increase in regional funding for the arts. Shortly after the debate, $10million was set aside for supporting arts events of regional significance to Auckland.

In 2009 Prast appeared as an arts commentator on TVNZ's Breakfast programme, sharply criticising the Auckland City Council for overspending on International Theatre Productions.

== Filmography ==
=== Television ===
- Mortimer's Patch (1983)
- Gloss as Alistair Redfern (1987–1990)
- Erebus: The Aftermath (1988)
- Shortland Street as Nurse Paul Churchill (1993, 1994, 1995)
- Hercules: The Legendary Journeys as First Soldier (1995–1996)
- Riding High as Ralph (1995)
- Xena: Warrior Princess as Nemos (1995)
- Mercy Peak as Tom Strachey (2001–2003)
- Serial Killers
- Go Girls as Jeffrey Duff (2010–2012)
- Filthy Rich as Sir Douglas (2016-2017)
- The Gulf as Adam Harding (2019-2021)
- The Brokenwood Mysteries as Gordon Godley (2022)
- Under the Vines as Rupert Shaw (2022-2023)

=== Film ===
- The Sinking of the Rainbow Warrior as Louis Deschamps (1992)
- When Love Comes Along which premiered at the 1998 Toronto International Film Festival
- You Move, You Die an Indie Thriller written and directed by Ketzal Sterling
- X as Reverend Ernest Miller, Maxine's Father (2022)
- MaXXXine as Reverend Ernest Miller, Maxine's Father (2024)

== Politics ==
In June 2010 Prast announced his intention to stand as a mayoral candidate in the October Auckland mayoral election. He stated that his experience and leadership would allow him to be an effective mayor, the first as it transitions into "Super City". At the time, he talked about his sexual orientation: "If anything I think that my sexual orientation has given me a much greater empathy with people. And isn't this what we're supposed to be mulling on and electing? Someone that is good with people? [...] My feeling as a gay man is that we're all in this together, irrespective of our sexual orientation. And really, irrespective of our political leanings. I mean when you're sitting in rush hour in Auckland are you from the left or the right, are you gay or straight? It doesn't matter. You're from Auckland. We have many, many issues that we all share, irrespective of our political viewpoint or our sexual orientation." He was not successful in his bid, finishing fifth in the field of five listed candidates.

== Recognition ==
He gained recognition for his work as director of the inaugural Auckland Festival (2003), when it was voted by Metro Readers Poll as the "Event of the Year". The same Metro Readers Poll also voted him "Auckland Man of the Year".

In November 2026 he was presented with the Scroll of Honour from the Variety Artists Club of New Zealand for his contribution to New Zealand entertainment.
