= Dena Kennedy =

New Zealand actor/ producer

- Born: Dena-Marie Kennedy; Wellington, New Zealand
- Occupation: Actress Film Production

Dena-Marie Kennedy is a New Zealand actor, director, and film production professional. She is best known for her appearance as a teacher, Miss Agnes O'Flaherty in the New Zealand television series Seven Periods with Mr Gormsby, and has also performed in numerous theatre and television productions.

== Career ==
Kennedy graduated from Toi Whakaari: New Zealand Drama School in 2001 with a Bachelor of Performing Arts (Acting). She was in the television production When We Go to War directed, by Peter Burger. She was assistant editor on the short film Suni Man (2012), written and directed by Hamish Mortland, line producer for The Last Saint, written and directed by Rene Naufahu, and associate producer for The Inland Road (2017), written and directed by Jackie van Bleek.

She has been nominated for two Chapman Tripp Theatre Awards: in 2001 for Most Promising Female Newcomer of the Year for her role in Have Car, Will Travel by Mitch Tawhi Thomas which won five Chapman Tripp awards including for director Rachel House, and in 2005 for Supporting Actress of the Year for her role in Boston Marriage.

Kennedy directed the live-stage show Daffodils by Bullet Heart Club in 2014 at Q Theatre in Auckland. Daffodills was later released as a feature film of the same name in 2019.

== Filmography ==
=== Television ===
Year	Title	Role	Notes
2004	The Insider's Guide To Happiness	Kat	"Is Happiness An Accident?" (S01E01) "Who Controls Your Happiness?" (S01E02) "Are You In Denial?" (S01E05) "Do You Deserve To Be Happy?" (S01E06)
2005-2006	Seven Periods with Mr Gormsby	Agnes O'Flaherty	Main role
2010	This Is Not My Life	Barmaid	Episode 10
2011	Go Girls	Midwife	"A Life Changing Experience" (S03E07)
2012	Nothing Trivial	Midwife	"Sea Horses Mate For Life, True or False?" (S02E09)
2013	Sunny Skies	Sally	Season 1, Episode 2
