= When Love Comes (1998 film) =

1998 film

When Love Comes Along
- Directed by: Garth Maxwell
- Produced by: Jonathan Dowling; Michele Fantl
- Starring: Rena Owen; Dean O'Gorman; Simon Prast; Nancy Brunning; Sophia Hawthorne; Simon Westaway
- Cinematography: Darryl Ward
- Edited by: Cushla Dillon
- Release date: 16 September 1998
- Running time: 94 min.
- Country: New Zealand
- Language: English

When Love Comes Along is a 1998 New Zealand drama film directed by Garth Maxwell. The film was produced by Jonathan Dowling and Michele Fantl.

== Cast ==
- Rena Owen as Katie
- Dean O'Gorman as Mark
- Simon Prast as Stephen
- Nancy Brunning as Fig
- Sophia Hawthorne as Sally
- Simon Westaway as Eddie

== Reception ==
In Variety Glenn Lovell says "Owen’s strong, understated performance and decidedly nonexploitative handling of sensitive material can’t cover for fragmented narrative and serious focus problems. " New York Times reviewer Stephen Holden writes "Finally, not even Ms. Owen's screen presence and the actors' intensely earnest performances can pull together the strands of this meandering, indulgent film." Empire's William Thomas gives it 2 stars. He says "Abandoning the hypnotic psychosis of his deranged Gothic debut, Jack Be Nimble, New Zealander Garth Maxwell has here fashioned an uninvolving melodrama that mixes music and emotion to largely soporific effect." Rick Groen of The Globe and Mail gave it 2 stars and writes "In the imitative hands of writer-director Garth Maxwell, this picture seems a tiny but classic example of the self-imposed fate elected by certain foreign films in the throes of the U.S. cultural onslaught. Other than the Kiwi inflections, there's nothing remotely indigenous about the movie, there's nothing that anchors it to the particularities or peculiarities of its native land." Phoebe Flowers of the Miami Herald gave it 2 stars and says Maxwell "can't quite create an effective atmosphere of romance or comedy. and were it not for the strong performance of Rena Owen (Once Were Warriors), When Love Comes might be an outright failure." The Vancouver Sun's Marke Andrews also gave it 2 stars. He writes it is a movie "in which characters wring their hands with emotions that never make a connection with the audience." In the Los Angeles Times Kevin Thomas writes "Maxwell displays a talent for dialogue and direction — and also for apt song lyrics — to make these people engaging and worth caring about. Owen and Prast, both of whom are well-seasoned actors, possess a wit and depth that lend gravity to a film intent on capturing the skittishness and tentativeness that so often accompany matters of the heart."
