= Seven Periods with Mr Gormsby =

- DVD cover
- Genre: Satire; Comedy
- Created by: Danny Mulheron; Dave Armstrong; Tom Scott
- Written by: Danny Mulheron; Dave Armstrong; Tom Scott
- Directed by: Danny Mulheron
- Starring: David McPhail
- Country of origin: New Zealand
- No. of seasons: 2
- No. of episodes: 14

Production
- Running time: 25 minutes per episode

Original release
- Network: TVNZ 1
- Release: 6 May 2005 – 8 May 2006

Seven Periods with Mr Gormsby is a satirical New Zealand television series, created and written by Danny Mulheron (who also directs and co-produces), Dave Armstrong, and Tom Scott. It stars David McPhail as the titular Mr Gormsby, whose politically incorrect attitudes and "old school" teaching style clash and contrast with the environment at the fictional Tepapawai High School. The show pokes fun at the New Zealand education system but also at modern New Zealand social attitudes more generally.

== Plot ==
The story follows various events at a New Zealand low-decile high school in a low-income area having often poorly qualified teaching staff and many students with difficult socio-economic backgrounds—mostly belonging to ethnic minorities, Māori and Pasifika.

Season One sees the appointment of Mortimer Gormsby to the relieving role of Class 5F. His conservative ways and attempts to discipline students immediately see the rest of the faculty try to have him removed. The previously troublesome 5F slowly take to their new teacher, and in turn he develops a respect for them. However, at the end of Season One, Gormsby is fired. Outside of 5F, the rest of the school is plagued by mismanagement, poor test scores and the Education Review Office.

Season Two sees the reinstatement of Gormsby. Meanwhile, the Education Review Office decides that Tepapawai and McLeod's Girls School should merge. The question of which school should close is the main storyline of Season Two.

== Characters ==
- Mortimer Ellis Gormsby (David McPhail) - Relief teacher. Gormsby is ex-army and well travelled. He is an old school disciplinarian, conservative and brash, frequently calling students and staff offensive names based on ethnicity, gender, intellect, and sexual orientation, or by mocking their names (he calls Roger Dascent 'Mr Pissent' and Hone Hakanui 'Half-Caste'). His conservative ways put him in conflict with many of the faculty, especially Steve Mudgeway, who tries to have him fired in Season One, Episode Two. He has a hatred for bureaucracy, 'mamby pamby' modern attitudes and trade unions, especially the PPTA. Despite these prejudices, Gormsby develops an affinity for his 5F class over the series, and in turn a respect develops from the students towards him, especially from Hohepa. At the end of Season One, Gormsby is fired by Acting Principal Steve Mudgeway. In Season Two, Episode One he is rehired as a Guidance Counselor, then reinstated as teacher of 5F. At the end of the series, he rises to Deputy Principal of Tepapawai/McLeod's, after implicitly directing 5F to burn McLeod's down in order to save Tepapawai from merging with McLeod's.
- Roger Dascent (Paul McLaughlin) - The principal of Tepapawai Boys High School. In Season One he has little moral compass, worrying on saving money, not involving the authorities or avoiding conflict by dismissing complaints or ignoring on-campus problems. He is pursued throughout the series by Marion Patterson from the Education Review Office, an attraction he does not reciprocate. In Season One, Episode Seven, a decision on reducing staff numbers sends him into a mental health crisis, where he is driven away in an ambulance. In Season Two, Episode One, he returns to his old position, but with having been diagnosed as 'clinically insane'. In Season Two, Episode Six, he reluctantly proposes to Marion Patterson to prevent Tepapawai merging with McLeod's Girls School, but after this raises issues at the Ministry of Education, they are able to separate amicably. He then proposes to Lauren, who accepts. After the McLeods fire, Dascent ends the series as Principal of the merged Tepapawai/McLeods.
- Steve Mudgeway (Jason Hoyte) - The school counsellor and 'acting deputy vice principal'. Steve is Gormsby's prime antagonist, and is shown to be selfish, self-interested, and manipulative. He is also shown to be very ambitious and aspires to be more than a school counsellor. He has an interest in film, and brags about minor achievements like being an extra in the Extended DVD version of Lord of the Rings, writing his screenplay, and "helping" on the script of The Piano, as well as being in the Auckland Development Cricket Squad. He is a frequent womanizer. At the beginning of the series he is in a relationship with Fenn Partington, but sleeps with Agnes O'Flahrety in the music recording booth. This causes her to get pregnant, and Fenn to break up with Steve. Steve then pressures Agnes to have an abortion, which she does, but this causes her to fall into a depressive state, before she ends things also with Steve. In Season One, Episode Seven, he becomes Acting Principal of Tepapawai after Roger Dascent's mental breakdown. His first act is to fire Gormsby. In Season Two, Episode One, he angrily 'quits' after Roger is reinstated, and Gormsby is hired as the Guidance Counsellor. However, his car is destroyed by Hohepa. In Season Two, Episode Five he and Fenn begin to get back together, but their night together is cut short after 5F sabotage Steve's latrine, causing him to fall into a latrine pit. In Season Two, Episode Six, while the rest of faculty band together to save Tepapawai from merging with McLeod's Girls School, Steve begins secretly lining up a role for himself as Principal at McLeod's, despite outwardly supporting his colleagues. In Season Two, Episode Seven, Steven approaches all female faculty to court them for marriage as the McLeod's role requires him to be married. They all reject him, and he angrily chastises his colleagues before leaving. After the McLeod's fire, Steve ends the series back as Guidance Counsellor.
- Fenn Partington (Tandi Wright) - A professional and kind English teacher. She is shown to be one of the more competent faculty members, who cares about education and student well-being. At the beginning of the series, she was in a relationship with Steve Mudgeway, but broke it off after he and Agnes O'Flaherty slept together, making Agnes pregnant. To get her own back, she sleeps with Afioga, a student. This causes her to be fired, but she is quickly rehired after it emerges that as a result, his reading scores have notably increased, and Fenn is singled out by the Ministry of Education as an exceptional teacher. In Season Two, Episode One, she and Hone Hakanui are shown to have started a relationship; however, Fenn ends this in Season Two, Episode Four after Hone's drinking and gambling cause issues on the school 'camp'. She and Steve nearly get back together, but after Steve proposes to her only to secure his job, she leaves him permanently.
- Lauren (Michele Amas) - An honest and perceptive secretary. She frequently is roped into Roger Dascent's mismanagement, such as helping him duck calls from Marion Patterson and not calling the police when there are issues on school. She is often the conscience of the show, such as highlighting the amorality of selling Māori and Pacific Island Students to rugby-playing schools. Despite being reluctantly involved in Roger's schemes, she cares deeply about him, being the only faculty member to visit him in the psychiatric facility. At the end of the series, Roger proposes to Lauren, which she accepts.
- Agnes Maria Teresa O'Flaherty (Dena Kennedy) - A sweet-natured, Catholic social studies/history teacher. In the beginning of the show, she and Steve Mudgeway are seen flirting, despite Steve being in a relationship with Fenn Partington. Later, they have sex, causing Agnes to become pregnant. Despite wanting to keep the baby, Steve pressures her into having an abortion. This causes Agnes to fall into a depressive state, ultimately leading to a suicide attempt in Season One, Episode Four. Despite this, she returns to her job, developing a close friendship with Alisdair Morton. In Season Two, Episode Five, she arouses Alisdair, leading to the two of them entering a romantic relationship, and were still seen together at the end of the show.
- Alisdair Morton (Thomas Robins) - A queer economics teacher. Although frequently competent at his job, his sexual orientation makes him the punchline of many jokes or staff comments. In Season One, Episode Seven, a rumour spread that he has AIDS, but it instead is anal warts. He shared a close friendship with Agnes O'Flaherty, which becomes romantic in Season Two, Episode Five. Prior to that he had an off-screen relationship with a man called Vinaj, who left him in Season Two, Episode Four. He displays many stereotypical queer characteristics, such as an absence of sporting skill and a love of musical theater. He is also shown to be quite well travelled.
- Hone Hakanui (Louis Sutherland) - An incompetent Māori studies teacher. Despite being head of the department, he cannot speak the Māori language and is shown to be lazy, culturally incompetent, and out of his depth. In Season Two, Episode One, he is seen in a relationship with Fenn. In Season Two, he develops a gambling addiction at school, where he gambles away to Rak all the school's money for a school trip. In Season Two, Episode Five, he gets drunk on school camp, prompting Fenn to break up with him. In Season Two, Episode Seven, he reveals he is actually Samoan.
- Lesley Tangaroa (Grace Hoet)- A Māori lesbian P.E. teacher. Despite being a P.E. teacher, she is shown to be unfit and lazy at her job, focusing more on playing social sport than teaching students. She is heavy, being shown as the only faculty to be able to barge through a door (through the power of '10 tonnes of Tūhoe' in Gormsby's words). Her sexual orientation makes her the ridicule of the staff and students. In Season One, Episode Six, she tried to kiss Agnes O'Flahrety, mistaking her for queer, but Agnes rebukes her advance.
- Werner Hundertwasser (Nigel Collins) - Head of Music. A German hippie, Werner is shown to be generally incompetent at playing music. His German heritage sometimes makes him stand out in a New Zealand environment, such as not knowing the slightest thing about cricket.
- Marion Patterson (Geraldine Brophy) - The Education Review Office school inspector. Marion is shown as a tough, honest women, with an unreciprocated attraction to Roger Dascent. This means that despite Tepapawai's poor educational outcomes, the ERO never really rebukes the school. She and Roger attend a nudist weekend between Season One Episode Six and Seven. In Season Two, Episode One, she reveals to Acting Principal Steve Mudgeway that the Ministry of Education plans on merging Tepapawai and Mcleod's Girls School,
- Rak (Charles Lum) - School cleaner, formerly a nuclear physicist in Cambodia, who runs a successful gambling racket on campus.

=== Class 5F ===
- Elvis Hohepa (R. J. Smiler). Of Māori descent. He is shown to have a troubled past, with uncles in gangs and in prison, and being raised by a solo parent. This makes him the subject of much contempt by Steve Mudgeway. Despite this he is excellent at both cricket and rugby and intelligent, as he taught himself the Māori language. At the end of Season One he is expelled, and in Season Two, Episode One, he gets his revenge by burning Steve's new car. At the end of the series, he is appointed as Assistant Māori Teacher, smirking to Steve that he could call him 'Mr Hohepa'.
- Emile Bastabus (Joseph Moore). A troubled Pākehā child from a broken home. He is frequently seen crying, prompting Gormsby to shout "Stop blubbing, Bastabus!"
- Afioga (Feterika Sage). Referred to by Gormsby as one of "the Islander boys", he is infamous for leaving his desk untidy. This nature leads him to be discovered as the culprit of an incident in which a used condom was left in the wharenui following his sexual encounter with Mrs. Partington (his remedial reading teacher).
- Ama'ata'a Uleiata'aua Alupepe (Halaifonua Finau). Another "Islander boy", Gormsby comments on his name as a "mouthful". He is interested in modern rap music, while being an impatient player of cricket, getting stumped while advancing halfway up the crease to play a shot.
- Govind (Hursh Saha). An Indian-descended boy, who is one of the better-educated in the class, sitting towards the front. He demonstrates the qualities of a hustler, selling his father's pornographic material to a large customer base in Season Two, including Hone Hakanui. Additionally, he accepts a small "dowry" from Afioga in exchange for his sister in the school dance.
- Minh (Samson Phommachack). An Asian boy, whose exact heritage is unknown, claiming both Chinese and Korean tendencies (the latter of which is his bleached hairstyle). He runs, alongside Rak, the school cleaner, an underground gambling operation, of which Hone Hakanui falls to. He is a high achieving student in 5F, achieving a score of 94% for one math test.
- Gareth le Tissier (Lyndon McGaughran). The second Pākekā child of the class (assumedly of French heritage), who exists ambiguously as another moderate-to-high achiever. It is revealed, through one of Gormsby's field tests, that le Tissier is a homosexual, or a "damp-eyed nancy boy" as Gormsby affectionately refers to it.

== Filming and broadcasting ==
The series ran for two seasons; the first was broadcast in 2005 on TV ONE in New Zealand and ABC TV in Australia. The second series was shown in New Zealand in 2006 and in Australia, on ABC2, April 2008. DVDs of the series were sold in Australia through the ABC Shop. The series was nominated for Best Script and Best Comedy in the 2006 NZ Screen Awards.

The program was filmed at two schools in the suburbs of Lower Hutt: the first season at Wainuiomata College and the second at Petone College.

The first season's school's original location is now occupied by Wainuiomata Little Theatre.
Address: 106 Moohan St, Wainuiomata, Lower Hutt 5014, New Zealand (Google map location)

== Episodes ==
=== Series 1 (2005) ===
No. overall	No. in season	Title	Directed by	Written by	Original release date
1	1	"The Appalling Mr Gormsby"	Danny Mulheron	Dave Armstrong, Danny Mulheron & Tom Scott	6 May 2005
2	2	"Comrade Gormsby"	Danny Mulheron	Dave Armstrong, Danny Mulheron & Tom Scott	13 May 2005
3	3	"Human Relationships"	Danny Mulheron	Dave Armstrong, Danny Mulheron & Tom Scott	20 May 2005
4	4	"Open Day"	Danny Mulheron	Dave Armstrong, Danny Mulheron & Tom Scott	27 May 2005
5	5	"The Retarded Boy"	Danny Mulheron	Dave Armstrong, Danny Mulheron & Tom Scott	3 June 2005
6	6	"Coon Tunes"	Danny Mulheron	Dave Armstrong, Danny Mulheron & Tom Scott	10 June 2005
7	7	"The ERO Parade"	Danny Mulheron	Dave Armstrong, Danny Mulheron & Tom Scott	17 June 2005

=== Series 2 (2006) ===
No. overall	No. in season	Title	Directed by	Written by	Original release date
8	1	"Heads Will Roll"	Danny Mulheron	Dave Armstrong, Danny Mulheron & Tom Scott	27 March 2006
9	2	"Crime and Punishment"	Danny Mulheron	Dave Armstrong, Danny Mulheron & Tom Scott	3 April 2006
10	3	"The Slave Trade"	Danny Mulheron	Dave Armstrong, Danny Mulheron & Tom Scott	10 April 2006
11	4	"Dancing with the Staff"	Danny Mulheron	Dave Armstrong, Danny Mulheron & Tom Scott	17 April 2006
12	5	"Camp Te Papawai"	Danny Mulheron	Dave Armstrong, Danny Mulheron & Tom Scott	24 April 2006
13	6	"An Inspector Calls"	Danny Mulheron	Dave Armstrong, Danny Mulheron & Tom Scott	1 May 2006
14	7	"For Whom The Bell Tolls"	Danny Mulheron	Dave Armstrong, Danny Mulheron & Tom Scott	8 May 2006

== Reception ==
The series was received mostly positively by Australian critics, although some aspects of its politically incorrect nature raised some eyebrows.

Ray Cassin (The Age) writes that the series is attacking hypocrisy on all fronts and tries to unmask deceits and pretensions with a rather relentless and gleeful insistence. Jim Schembri (Sydney Morning Herald) argues the show skates on thin ice due to its politically incorrect nature and sees it as another example of how far New Zealand is ahead of Australia when it comes to dealing with delicate matters through comedy. Alan Mascarenhas (The Age) states while the series has low production values and patchy acting it does nevertheless possess a pythonesque quality. He recalls that he couldn't stop laughing even at scenes where he probably shouldn't have. According to him the show goes further than The Office ever dared balancing between fun and bigotry.
