= Emmeline Hawthorne =

New Zealand actress (born 1980)

- Born: 1980 (age 45–46); New Zealand
- Occupation: Actress
- Years active: 1997–present
- Height: 170 cm (5 ft 7 in)
- Spouse: Bailey Mackey (m. 2004–?)
- Relatives: Elizabeth Hawthorne (mother); Raymond Hawthorne (father); Sophia Hawthorne (sister)

Emmeline Hawthorne (born 1980) is a New Zealand actress. She is known for her role as Anne Greenlaw on the long running New Zealand soap opera Shortland Street. An acclaimed stage and screen actress, she played Hannah Priest in the television series Jackson's Wharf, Bane in Xena: Warrior Princess and the lead role of Theresa in the 2003 feature Orphans and Angels. She is the daughter of Raymond and Elizabeth Hawthorne and sister of Sophia Hawthorne, who died in 2016.

== Filmography ==
Film and television
Year	Title	Role	Notes
2000	Jackson's Wharf	Hannah Priest	TV series
2001	Xena: Warrior Princess	Bane	Episode: "To Helicon and Back"
2001–2004	Shortland Street	Anne Kahu	Regular role
2003	Orphans and Angels	Theresa	

== Awards ==
Hawthorne was nominated for the NZ Film Award for Best Performance in a Feature Film for her work in Orphans and Angels.
