= The Queen's Closet (ensemble) =

Early music ensemble in New Zealand

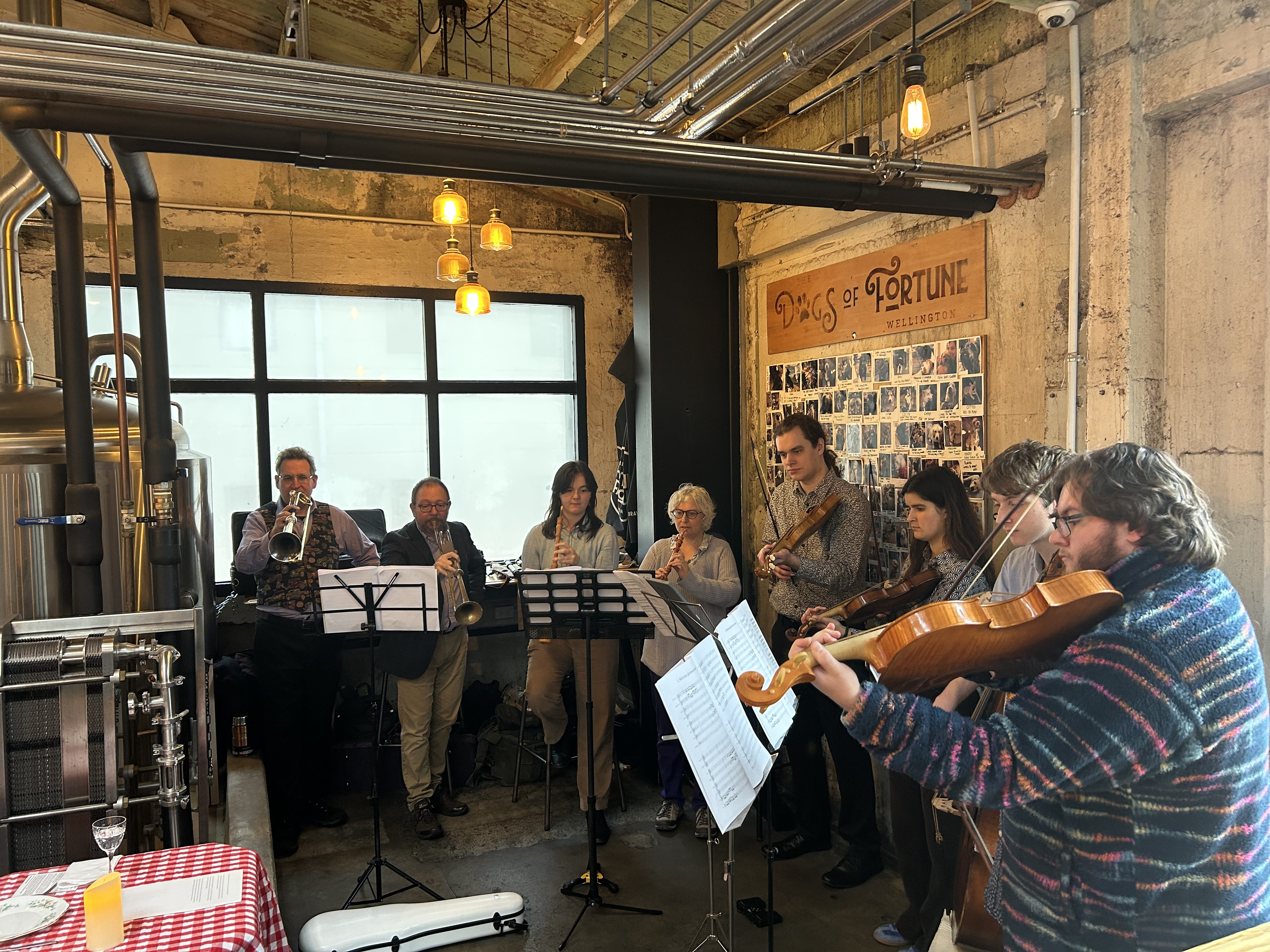
- The Queen's Closet performing in 2025

Background information
- Origin: Wellington
- Genre: Early music
- Years active: 2018–present
- Website: thequeenscloset.net

The Queen's Closet is an early music ensemble based in Wellington, New Zealand. The ensemble was established by Gordon and Sharon Lehany in 2018, and specialises in 17th-century music and performance practices using period instruments and techniques to recreate the sound and spirit of early Baroque music. Their aim is to present early music in ways that follow the performance practices of the era in which it was composed, and make this music engaging for audiences. The group is a live performance ensemble and emphasises the social experience between the performers and their audience. Gordon Lehany is the artistic and musical director, and Sharon Lehany is the manager and producer.

The name chosen for the ensemble makes a link with the resurgence of colour and creativity following the 17th-century restoration of the English monarchy. The Queen's Closet is the name of a room in the 17th-century Ham House, near London. This room was redecorated during the restoration period, and illustrates the exuberance of the period.

The group uses reproductions of original instruments from the restoration period, and aims for performance practices that are representative of the era. Instruments include the natural trumpet, and the hoboy – a double reed woodwind instrument that is a predecessor of the modern oboe. The performances are supported by scholarship including the study of surviving instruments, and locating and interpreting sources from 300 to 400 years ago.

Their first concert, titled Restoration, was held in Wellington's City Gallery on 1 June 2019. A further concert, titled All The Pleasures, was held in Prefab Hall on 3 November 2019. The ensemble has also performed at Old Saint Paul's, St Andrew's on The Terrace, St Peter's on Willis Street, the Hannah Playhouse, the Public Trust Hall, at the CupaDupa festival, and as part of the Classical on Cuba events programme.

In November 2022, The Queen's Closet performed Cloverton: In Love & In Wine, a work that blended the music of Henry Purcell with a contemporary story written by Dave Armstrong especially for the performance. The work follows a tradition from the Restoration period of mixing spoken drama with operatic music.

In May 2024, Orchestra Wellington opened their 2024 season with a programme including The Queen's Closet performing works by Giovanni Pergolesi.

Performance of Furioso at Hunter Lounge

One of the larger programmes presented by the ensemble is a combination of segments from three operas that are all linked to the epic poem Orlando Furioso written by the Italian poet Ludovico Ariosto. The segments are from Francesca Caccini's La liberazione di Ruggiero, Jean-Baptiste Lully's Roland, and Vivaldi's Orlando Furioso. The Queen's Closet performed their Furioso programme in 2023, and again in 2026, with some staging in the second performance.

The Queen's Closet is supported by a charitable trust named QCT – a registered charity in New Zealand.

== Recognition and awards ==
The Queen's Closet received two nominations at the Fringe Festival Awards 2020, for Most Promising Emerging Company and Outstanding Ensemble Performance for their show, Quanto Dolce: Musick for the Passions. The ensemble received a further nomination at the 2022 Fringe Awards, for Outstanding Ensemble, for their performance of their own new edition of The Judgment of Paris.

== List of performances ==
All venues are in Wellington, unless stated otherwise.

Date	Title/Event	Venue	Notes	References
2019-06-01	Restoration	City Gallery Wellington	Inaugural public performance by The Queen's Closet	
2019-09-18	Hutt City Lunchtime Concert	Mt Mark's Wesley United Church, Lower Hutt		
2019-10-04	Karori Classics	St Mary's Anglican Church, Karori		
2019-11-05	All the Pleasures	Prefab Hall		
2020-03-08	Quanto Dolce: Musick for the Passions	Prefab Hall	Part of NZ Fringe 2020. Nominated for Most Promising Emerging Company and Outstanding Ensemble Performance	
2020-08-01	Masters of the Guild	Old St Paul's	By invitation - featured performance in the "Housewarming" to reopen Old St Paul's following earthquake strengthening	
2020-08-07	I Tesori	Wellington Cathedral of St Paul	Part of the "TGIF" Friday lunchtime performance series	
2020-11-22	Seraphic Flames and Heav'nly Love	St Mary of the Angels	With the Bach Choir of Wellington	
2021-03-14	The Glory of Habsburg	Prefab Hall	Part of NZ Fringe 2021	
2021-03-28	Gloria	St Mary of the Angels	With Nota Bene	
2021-08-11	For the chapel or the table	St Andrews on the Terrace	Part of their lunchtime performance series	
2021-12-18	Salvatoris! Christmas with The Queen's Closet	Old St Paul's		
2022-02-20	The Judgment of Paris	Foxglove Ballroom	Semi-staged production of a new edition created by The Queen's Closet. Part of NZ Fringe 2022. Nominated for Outstanding Ensemble	
2022-06-09	Lunchtime at Old St Paul's	Old St Paul's		
2022-07-23	Decodance	St James Theatre foyer	Collaboration with Australian choreographer Chrissie Parrott. Part of Classical on Cuba 2022	
2022-07-24	Seria O	City Gallery, Adam Auditorium	Part of Classical on Cuba 2022	
2022-11-24	Cloverton: In Love and In Wine	Te Auaha	A new 'modern semi-opera' created by The Queen's Closet in collaboration with Dave Armstrong	
2023-02-24	Echoes: Musicking across the centuries	St Peter's on Willis	Part of the Mahi Toi performance series	
2023-03-04	Musicking with Several Friends	Hannah Warehouse	NZ Fringe 2023	
2023-03-04	Dolcissima! (Concert 1 of "Musicking with several friends")	Hannah Warehouse	Part of NZ Fringe 2023	
2023-03-04	(Restoration) Songs (Concert 2 of "Musicking with several friends")	Hannah Warehouse	Part of NZ Fringe 2023	
2023-03-05	Alla Bastarda! (Concert 3 of "Musicking with several friends")	Hannah Warehouse	Part of NZ Fringe 2023	
2023-03-05	Chvalte Boha (Concert 4 of "Musicking with several friends")	Hannah Warehouse	Part of NZ Fringe 2023	
2023-03-25	Decodance	Hannah Courtyard	Part of CubaDupa 2023	
2023-03-25	TrumpetWars	Cuba Mall	A new piece of street theatre created by The Queen's Closet for CubaDupa, staging live games of 'Battleship' via natural trumpet signalling	
2023-07-30	The Judgment of Paris	Hannah Playhouse	Staged production of The Queen's Closet's new edition	
2023-02-09	Furioso	Te Auaha	A cycle of three 'mini-opera's created by The Queen's Closet - short condensations of three operas based on Ludovico Ariosto's 16th century epic poem, Orlando Furioso. Part of Classical on Cuba 2023	
2023-10-15	Harmonie Universelle	Foxglove Ballroom		
2023-12-10	Wassail!	Old St Paul's		
2024-03-16	QC@UC	UC Arts Recital Room, University of Canterbury, Christchurch	Collaboration with the University of Canterbury School of Music	
2024-03-24	The Waits Band	Cuba Mall	Part of CubaDupa 2024	
2024-03-30	Dolorosa	St Peter's on Willis		
2024-05-04	The Grand Gesture pre-concert performance	Renouf Foyer, Michael Fowler Centre	Collaboration with Orchestra Wellington Pre-concert performance opening Orchestra Wellington's 2024 subscription season	
2024-06-22	Gala Ball — Party Like it's 1689	Foxglove Ballroom	Including a collaboration with Royal New Zealand Ballet	
2024-09-06	NZSM lunchtime recital	Adam Concert Room, Victoria University of Wellington	Part of Te Kōkī - New Zealand School of Music's lunchtime performance series	
2024-10-06	Music Futures fundraiser	St Anne's Church, Northland, Wellington	By invitation - featured performance at the annual fundraising event of Music Futures charity	
2024-11-16	A Glorious Day	St Mary of the Angels	With the Tudor Consort	
2024-12-08	NZMS Conference - Musicology in practice - a case study	Adam Concert Room, Victoria University of Wellington	A performance-demonstration at Musicology Matters Today, the 2024 annual conference of the New Zealand Musicological Society	
2025-04-19	Paschaltide	St Peter's on Willis		
2025-05-31	Dioclesian	The Hunter Lounge, Victoria University of Wellington	Semi-staged production with The Tudor Consort	
2025-08-02	A Baroque Soirée	Public Trust Hall	Collaboration with Black & Gold venues. Part of Visa Wellington on a Plate 2025	
2025-08-02	Bread and Circuses	Fortune Favours	A new sound installation commissioned by The Queen's Closet, composed by Luka Reardon. Part of Classical on Cuba 2025	
2025-10-25	Gala Ball 2025	Public Trust Hall		
2025-12-20	Shawms Against Humanity	Sweat Shop Brew Kitchen, Auckland		
2026-02-21	La Serenìsima	St Mary of the Angels		
2026-04-04	Kroměříž: From the Archive	Harbourside Function Centre		
2026-06-06	Melothesia	Harbourside Function Centre		
2026-06-07	Going Rogue	The Rogue & Vagabond		
2026-08-08	Gala Ball 2026	Public Trust Hall		
2026-10-11	Furioso	Hunter Lounge	A cycle of three 'mini-opera's created by The Queen's Closet - short condensations of three operas based on Ludovico Ariosto's 16th century epic poem, Orlando Furioso| |	
