= Tandem Press =

Tandem Press is an independent publisher based in Auckland, New Zealand founded in 1990. It specializes in New Zealand fiction and non-fiction. It has published works such as Alan Duff's Once Were Warriors and Nepi Solomon's Jubilee, both of which have been adapted for film.

== Sources ==
- The New Zealand Writer's Handbook
- Writers & Artists' Yearbook
