= Jubilee (2000 film) =

New Zealand comedy drama film directed by Michael Hurst

- Release poster (text-less version)
- Directed by: Michael Hurst
- Screenplay by: Michael Bennett
- Based on: Jubilee by Nepi Solomon
- Produced by: John Barnett; Bill Gavin
- Starring: Cliff Curtis; Theresa Healey; Kevin Smith
- Cinematography: Leon Narbey
- Edited by: Eric de Beus
- Music by: David Donaldson; Steve Roche; Janet Roddick
- Production company: South Pacific Pictures
- Distributed by: Universal Pictures International (Australasia)
- Release date: 13 April 2000 (New Zealand)
- Running time: 94 minutes
- Country: New Zealand
- Language: English
- Budget: NZ$1.8 million

Jubilee is a 2000 New Zealand comedy drama film directed by Michael Hurst and written by Michael Bennett, based on the 1994 novel of the same name by Nepi Solomon. The film stars Cliff Curtis, Theresa Healey, and Kevin Smith, with a supporting cast including Hori Ahipene, Jaime Passier-Armstrong, Marise Wipani, Eru Potaka-Dewes, and Bruce Hopkins. Jubilee was Hurst's feature film directorial debut, as well as Curtis' debut as lead.

In the film, Billy Williams (Curtis) takes over the organisation of the Waimatua School 75th Jubilee, and attempts to redeem his reputation of being a procrastinator who struggles to get things done. However, his wife Pauline (Healey) begins to question her life choices when the event is attended by famous rugby player Max Seddon (Smith), with whom she has a past connection.

The film was produced by South Pacific Pictures and funded by the New Zealand Film Commission, with a budget of NZ$1.8M. It was distributed by Universal Pictures International and released on 13 April 2000. A DVD version was released in 2003 and 2004, for regions 2 and 4, respectively.

Jubilee received praise in New Zealand and saw Curtis win Best Actor at the 2000 Nokia New Zealand Film Awards, but had lacklustre commercial performance which limited its international distribution.

== Plot ==
Billy Williams lives in the small town of Waimatua, with his wife Pauline, and children Lucille and Walter. He's a good father and is likable, but has a reputation for procrastinating and never getting things done. Jobs around the house are no exception, with paint chipping and the wallpaper peeling off. Pauline is frustrated with the situation.

The upcoming Waimatua School 75th Jubilee is suddenly derailed when Agnes Morrison, who had been organising it, is crushed to death by a fainting bull during a semen extraction accident. Billy ends up taking on the task as Jubilee Chairman, and wants to prove himself to his friends and family, particularly Pauline, by organising a successful event and inviting past alumni to return to town to attend. Billy is especially excited about the return of Max Seddon, who had become an All Black and international rugby player.

With Billy busy chasing this project, Pauline begins reflecting on her life and questioning her choices. She develops a desire for action and self-transformation as she finishes Billy's uncompleted jobs. Max's anticipated return weighs on her mind; she had been his high school sweetheart, but he had gotten his coach's daughter pregnant and abruptly fled the town without saying goodbye. Pauline wonders what her life might have been like if things had been different. Max visits Pauline and attempts to apologise, but Pauline becomes upset, and asks him to leave. Later they meet again, and Max opens up to Pauline, wishing he could turn back the clock. Meanwhile, Billy finds organising the Jubilee is becoming difficult, and comes close to giving up again. He then learns that his even his closest friends expected him to fail, and finds a new boost of motivation to prove them wrong.

The jubilee begins to take shape and Billy earns respect in the small town, with everyone looking forward to the event, which initially goes well and gives Billy his confidence back. However, it gets derailed when a biker gang attends and causes a disturbance, leading to a brawl with the locals. In the aftermath of the event, Pauline approaches a battered Billy and embraces him, reaffirming that she cares for him, realising she chose to be with him because of his good heart and who he is.

== Cast ==
- Cliff Curtis as Billy Williams
- Theresa Healey as Pauline Williams
- Kevin Smith as Max Seddon
- Jaime Passier-Armstrong as Lucille Williams
- Hori Ahipene as Potu Williams
- Mabel Wharekawa as Mum Williams
- Eru Potaka Dewes as Rangi Kaawa
- Marise Wipani as Sharyn
- Liddy Holloway as Mrs Crawford
- Elizabeth Hawthorne as Charlotte Morrison
- Elizabeth McRae as Agnes Morrison
- Bruce Hopkins as Larry
- Charley Murphy Samau as Walter Williams
- Amiria Reriti as Minnie Williams
- Whetu Fala as Nefta Williams
- Taungaroa Emile as Tyron
- Ross Duncan as Wallace
- Vicky Haughton as Mary Taki
- Stephen Tozer as Mr Crawford
- Robert Bruce as Norm
- Anaru Grant as Mike
- Jason Brott as Big Sid
- Grant Bridger as Mr Waghorn
- Grant Triplow as Tama
- Jim Ngaata as Honi

== Production ==
Jubilee is based on the 1994 novel of the same name by Nepi Solomon. John Barnett, who was then Managing Director of South Pacific Pictures and on the board of the New Zealand Film Commission, bought the rights to make a movie from the book. The true identity of the author remains undisclosed, including to production staff, with a belief Solomon had served time in Auckland Prison and did not want to be identified. Solomon's own agent and publishers refused to identify them.

The film received NZ$1.8m of funding from the New Zealand Film Commission. Barnett and producer Bill Gavin brought on Michael Hurst as director, owing to his background in theatre and directing television series; it would be his first feature film. It was also the first leading role for actor Cliff Curtis, who played Billy.

Jubilee was recorded on location in Waitakere City, North West Auckland, and at Studio West. The production took place over a 6-week period with a crew of approximately 40 people, and used 35 mm colour film and Dolby Digital audio.

== Release ==
Jubilee was released on 13 April 2000. It was played across 17 cinemas in New Zealand, as well as the Hawaii International Film Festival. In 2001, it was played at the Douarnenez Film Festival in France.

A DVD version was released in the UK (region 2) on 25 August 2003, and in New Zealand and Australia (region 4) on 22 April 2004.

== Reception ==
Jubilee was received positively in New Zealand, but had lacklustre performance at the box office, limiting its international distribution prospects. In a 2001 interview, Hurst said he felt the distribution issue had been "very badly handled" and was unsure why the film "got buried".

Peter Calder of The New Zealand Herald gave Jubilee a 3/5 rating, praising Curtis' performance and the ability of Narbey's cinematography to "capture the essence of small-town New Zealand", but felt that the ending was "overwrought and dragged out", concluding "there are some clunkingly portentous lines, but it's a thoroughly satisfying slice of local life and lots of feelgood fun."

=== Accolades ===
For his performance as Billy, Curtis won Best Actor at the 2000 Nokia New Zealand Film Awards. John McKay also won Best Contribution to a Soundtrack for his work on the film. Jubilee was also nominated in several other categories, including Best Screenplay, Best Cinematography, and Best Original Music. Ahipene was also a finalist for Best Supporting Actor.
