= Futile Attraction =

- Directed by: Mark Prebble
- Written by: Mark Prebble, Benedict Reid
- Starring: Peter Rutherford; Danielle Mason; Alistair Browning; Glenda Tuaine; Michelle Ang
- Cinematography: Mathew Knight
- Music by: Jonathan Kennerley
- Distributed by: Twilight Productions Ltd.
- Release dates: 15 December 2004 (United States); 28 June 2005 (New Zealand)
- Running time: 82 minutes
- Country: New Zealand
- Language: English
- Budget: $33,000

Futile Attraction is a 2004 New Zealand film directed by Mark Prebble. It is an anti-romantic comedy filmed in mockumentary style. The movie attracted media attention for the fact that it was the first New Zealand feature film, and one of the first films internationally, to be crowd-funded through internet donations.

== Plot ==
A film crew are making a Reality TV show about a couple brought together by a dating agency. However, the couple are so incompatible that the crew must manipulate the relationship to get the footage they need for the show.

Randal (Peter Rutherford) is a telemarketer with a passion for telephones who has never quite broken away from his controlling mother; Germaine (Danielle Mason) is an activist who agrees to be filmed in order to publicise the threat a new dam poses to her favourite stream. During the filming, presenter Dudley (Alistair Browning), who is willing to do anything to get himself looking good on camera, clashes with Anne (Glenda Tuaine), who prefers to ignore their boss's ever-changing scripting instructions in preference to a more objective look at the reality of the relationship.

== Production ==
With limited resources available, the writers chose the mockumentary format for its combination of low budget requirements and comedic possibilities.

The movie was filmed in 2002 over 13 days. However, due to budgetary constraints, post-production took two-and-a-half years. Taika Waititi and Jemaine Clement appear in cameos.

The ground-breaking fundraising campaign started in early 2004. Having been rejected for funding by the New Zealand Film Commission, Prebble set up a website called www.MakeMarksMovie.com to raise money internationally. This internet crowd-funding campaign succeeded, despite taking place prior to kickstarter existing or Facebook being widely used. In addition to the money raised in this way, he received numerous offers in kind, from post-production services to poster design and band music.

== Distribution ==
Futile Attraction had a short cinema season in New Zealand followed by a DVD release by Arkles Entertainment. Internationally it was released by Echelon Entertainment. It can be streamed for free, along with a short making-of documentary, at NZ On Screen
