= AA Torque =

New Zealand television series

The AA Torque Show is a New Zealand television series about motor vehicles, mainly cars. The half-hour programme was first screened on TV One in 2005 and the second series was shown on Prime Television in April 2007. No other seasons were produced. The show was presented by Roger Walker, Danny Mulheron, Aaron Slight and Emma Hart. It was described by binglewootch.com as provocative, humorous and light-hearted in tone. The show format was similar to that of Top Gear.

AA Torque magazine is a publication produced by Fairfax Media which shares some contributors, editors and features with the TV show including contributions by the presenters themselves.
