= As Dreams Are Made On =

- Promotional flyer
- Directed by: Gabriel Reid
- Written by: Gabriel Reid
- Produced by: James Wallace; Gabriel Reid
- Starring: Raymond Hawthorne; Ian Hughes; Tanya Horo; Katherine Kennard; John Glass
- Cinematography: Alan Locke
- Edited by: Gabriel Reid
- Distributed by: New Zealand Film Commission
- Release date: 2004
- Running time: 11 minutes
- Country: New Zealand
- Language: English

As Dreams Are Made On is a 2004 short film written and directed by Gabriel Reid.

Ian Hughes plays Reuben Mills, a young actor feeling pressure to nest. With his company about to tour he finds himself at an emotional crossroads. The time has come to choose his path.

Gabriel Reid was inspired to undertake this project after researching his M.A. thesis examining film adaptations of Shakespeare. At the University of Auckland, his thesis was supervised by Professor MacDonald P. Jackson. Reid's research interviewees included John Barton, Hugh Cruttwell, Adrian Noble, Trevor Nunn, David Parfitt and Imogen Stubbs.

The film's title is derived from lines uttered by the magician Prospero, in Act IV, Scene I, of Shakespeare's late romance The Tempest:

Our revels now are ended. These our actors,
As I foretold you, were all spirits and
Are melted into air, into thin air:
And, like the baseless fabric of this vision,
The cloud-capp'd tow'rs, the gorgeous palaces,
The solemn temples, the great globe itself,
Yea, all which it inherit, shall dissolve,
And, like this insubstantial pageant faded,
Leave not a rack behind. We are such stuff
As dreams are made on; and our little life
Is rounded with a sleep.

== Festivals ==
- Rhode Island International Film Festival
- Drifting Clouds Film Festival
- Melbourne International Film Festival
- New Zealand International Film Festival
