= Leon Narbey =

New Zealand cinematographer

- Born: 2 August 1947 (age 79); Helensville, New Zealand
- Occupation: Cinematographer

Leon Gordon Alexander Narbey (born 2 August 1947) is a New Zealand cinematographer.

Born in Helensville, Narbey was educated at the Elam School of Fine Arts, specialising in sculpture. He married Anita Janske Narbey (1944 - 2019) in 1966 and they had together two daughters Vanessa and Beatrix. He lectured at the University of Canterbury in 1972, before joining the New Zealand Broadcasting Corporation as a news cameraman. In the mid-1970s, he shot the Geoff Steven documentary Te Matakite o Aotearoa, about the 1975 Māori land march. In 1978 he made Bastion Point: Day 507 with Merata Mita and Gerd Pohlmann, which he also edited and co-produced. Later he continued his partnership with Steven on three documentaries shot in China in 1979, including Gung Ho (about Rewi Alley) and The Humble Force.

He co-wrote and directed two feature films, Illustrious Energy (1987) and The Footstep Man (1992). In 1990, he shot the comedy-drama Ruby and Rata for Gaylene Preston. In 1993, he was director of photography on the feature film Desperate Remedies, for which he won the Best Cinematography award at the New Zealand Film and Television Awards in 1994. In the 1990s Narbey worked extensively with documentary director Shirley Horrocks on productions including Pleasures and Dangers, Act of Murder, Flip and Two Twisters, and Early Days Yet. In 1999, he was the director of photography on Jubilee, and was nominated for Best Cinematography in the 2000 Nokia New Zealand Film Awards.

In 2000 he shot the romantic drama The Price of Milk, the 2002 dramas Whale Rider and No. 2 (2006), the 2007 vampire film Perfect Creature, 2008's Dean Spanley and Rain of the Children, the 2009 Topp Twins documentary The Topp Twins: Untouchable Girls, the 2011 Samoan film The Orator, the 2013 drama Giselle, The Dead Lands in 2014, One Thousand Ropes in 2017 and in 2020 the film Whina.

== Awards ==
- Gold Award New Zealand Cinematographers Society for One Thousand Ropes (2017)
- Silver Award New Zealand Cinematographers Society for The Dead Lands (2016)
- Presented "Services to Cinema" Award at the Rialto Channel NZ Film Awards (2014)
- Awarded the Arts Foundation of New Zealand "Laureate Award" (2010)
