= The Ring Inz =

- Genre: Comedy
- Directed by: Mahanga Pihama
- Starring: Hori Ahipene; Katie Wolfe; Roimata Fox; William Davis; Awhina Rose Ashby; Kawariki Morgan; Stephanie Huriana Fong; Troy Tu'ua; Mere Arihi Pipi Takoko; Tūhoe Tamaiparea; Mana Epiha; Tiare Tawera
- Country of origin: New Zealand
- Original languages: Māori, English
- No. of series: 3
- No. of episodes: 21

Production
- Producer: Viv Wigby-Ngatai Mahanga Pihama
- Production locations: Auckland, New Zealand
- Camera setup: Multi-camera
- Running time: 30 Minutes
- Production company: Enter the Dragon

Original release
- Network: Māori Television
- Release: 23 March 2017 – 24 October 2019

The Ring Inz is a New Zealand comedy television show which ran from 2017 to 2019 on Māori Television. The show is about an underachieving kapa haka group which makes it to the national competition on a fluke, and tries to prepare for a performance of a lifetime.

The show was publicised as "Pitch Perfect meets Modern Family set on a marae".

== Production ==
The promo to the show was released in February 2017. The show premiered on 23 March 2017.The season finale aired on 4 May 2017. The second season premiered on 6 September 2018.
