= Savage Honeymoon =

New Zealand comedy film

- Directed by: Mark Beesley
- Written by: Mark Beesley
- Produced by: Steve Sachs
- Starring: Nicholas Eadie; Perry Piercy; Elizabeth Hawthorne
- Cinematography: Leon Narbey
- Edited by: Margot Francis
- Music by: Dean Savage
- Release date: September 1999
- Country: New Zealand
- Language: English

Savage Honeymoon is a comedy film from New Zealand. It is written and directed by Mark Beesley and stars Nicholas Eadie, Perry Piercy and Elizabeth Hawthorne. It was originally given a R18 rating but was changed to R15 on appeal.

== Production ==
Filming took place around Auckland and finished in August 1998.

== Cast ==
- Nicholas Eadie – Mickey Savage
- Perry Piercy – Louise Savage
- Elizabeth Hawthorne – Maisy Savage
- Sophia Hawthorne – Leesa Savage
- Ryan O'Kane – Dean Savage

== Reception ==
Lael Loewenstein from Variety writes "Though it’s sometimes tough to know just what to make of this wacky comedy, writer-director Mark Beasley’s film is fast-paced and entertaining." The New Zealand Heralds Peter Calder gave it 3 stars, saying "It's virtually impossible to dislike this" and "Simple stuff, really, but Beesley and a mostly solid ensemble make it work by making everything a size or two larger than life." Michael Lamb in Sunday Star Times gave it 3 stars and writes "the comedy gives way to a sentimental note as the marriage of Mickey and Louise is examined in dramatic detail, but all we really want are more Westie stylings." Petrovic Hans writes in The Press "I found the film veering in the wrong direction, however, when it tried to underline the caring and sentimentality of this boisterous bunch of hard-drinking petrolheads. Any minority, no matter how rough, is sure to look after its own, but this does not make up for any anti-social behaviour, as perceived by the rest of society."

== Awards ==
New Zealand Film and TV Awards 2000

- Best Supporting Actress - Elizabeth Hawthorne - Won
- Best Design – Gary MacKay – Won
- Best Costume Design – Emily Carter – Won
- Best Makeup – Denise Kum – Won
- Best Original Music – Dean Savage – Won
- Best Editing – Margot Francis – Nominated
