= Hori Ahipene =

Actor, director, playwright in New Zealand

Hori Ahipene is an actor and director in theatre, film and television in New Zealand. He is also an award-winning playwright with the Māori play Hide 'n Seek co-written with Hone Kouka. He became a well-known face in New Zealand for his dramatic performances in films such as Jubilee (2000), as well as The Piano (1993) and a guest role Xena: Warrior Princess in 2001. A versatile actor, he has also played lead roles in television sketch series, including the 1990s hit Skitz, The Semisis, Telly Laughs and Away Laughing. Most recently he was in the core cast of Maddigan's Quest and currently plays the role of "Angel" in the television drama Outrageous Fortune. He is an accomplished director with more than 15 years in the arts industry. He was a senior director on Skitz as well as long-running Māori-language programmes Korero Mai and Pukana. He was a creator and co-writer of the sitcom B&B with comedian Te Radar for Māori Television.

Ahipene studied acting at Toi Whakaari New Zealand Drama School. He graduated in 1989 with a Diploma in Acting. He has worked in theatre as an actor and as a theatre director.

== Filmography ==
=== Film ===
Year	Title	Role	Notes
1993	Mokopuna	Protestor	Short film
1993	The Piano	Mutu	
1994	Rapa Nui	Overseer	
1996	Chicken	Mourner	
2000	Jubilee	Potu Williams	
2003	The Legend of Johnny Lingo	Pioi	
2006	Perfect Creature	Parishioner	
2017	Te Makutu (The Curse)	The Ruanuku	Short film

=== Television ===
Year	Title	Role	Notes
1991	Away Laughing	Various	TV series
1993	Skitzo	Various	TV series
1993	Radio Wha Waho	Hemana	TV series
1996	Telly Laughs	Various	TV series
1998	The Semisis	Sia	TV series
1998	Shortland Street	Eddie Heka	TV series
1999	Hercules: The Legendary Journeys	Brutus	"Love on the Rocks"
2000	Jack of All Trades	Blackbeard	"The Floundering Father", "Shark Bait"
2001	Xena: Warrior Princess	Ferragus	"Many Happy Returns"
2002	Mercy Peak	Jimmy	"The Most Deserving"
2002	Mataku	Charlie	"The Heirloom"
2006	Maddigan's Quest	Tane	Regular role
2008	Legend of the Seeker	Gunther	"Bounty"
2009–10	Outrageous Fortune	Angel	Recurring role
2011	Waitangi: What Really Happened	Tohunga	TV film
2016	Terry Teo	Protest Leader	"Head to Head"
2017	Find Me a Maori Bride	Noel	"Whanau Day"
2017	The Ring Inz	Teepz / Aunty Mavis	TV series
