= Elizabeth Hawthorne =

New Zealand actress

Elizabeth Hawthorne ONZM
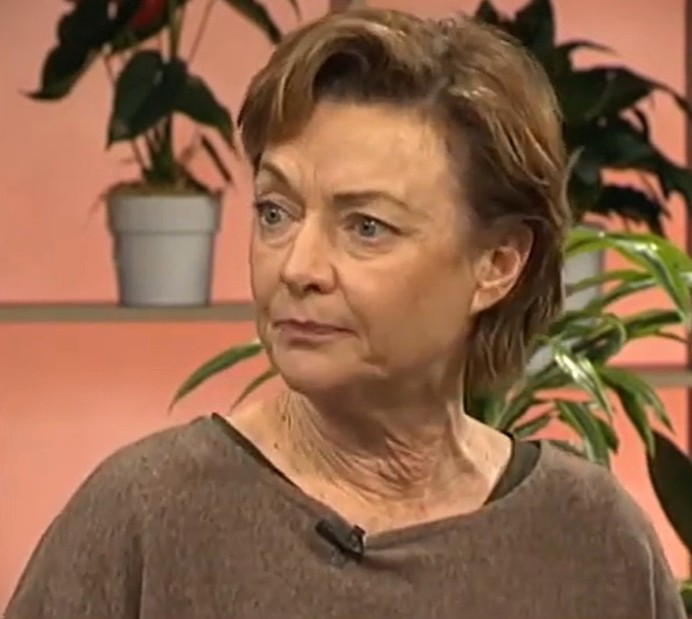
- Hawthorne in 2017
- Born: 30 April 1947 (age 79); New Zealand
- Occupation: Actress
- Years active: 1985–present
- Spouse: Raymond Hawthorne
- Relatives: Emmeline Hawthorne (daughter); Sophia Hawthorne (daughter)

Elizabeth Hawthorne ONZM (born 30 April 1947) is a New Zealand actress who is known for her role as Mrs. Macready in the 2005 film The Chronicles of Narnia: The Lion, the Witch and the Wardrobe and the Peter Jackson supernatural comedy The Frighteners. She had a small recurring role as the voice of Hera on Young Hercules, and partly played Alcmene in its parent show Hercules: The Legendary Journeys in the first season. She played Judge Harriet Caldwell in the 2004 TV movie Raising Waylon. Married to Raymond Hawthorne, she is the mother of Emmeline Hawthorne and the late Sophia Hawthorne.

== Filmography ==
=== Film ===
Year	Title	Role	Notes
1985	Hot Target	Suzanne Maxwell	
1992	Alex	Mrs. Benton	
1993	Jack Be Nimble	Bernice	
1994	The Last Tattoo	Henrietta Simpson	
1996	The Frighteners	Magda Rees-Jones	
2000	Savage Honeymoon	Maisy Savage	
2000	Jubilee	Charlotte Morrison	
2001	No One Can Hear You	Pat Kelly	
2001	Exposure	Det. Shoorwell	Video
2005	The Chronicles of Narnia: The Lion, the Witch and the Wardrobe	Mrs. Macready	
2007	30 Days of Night	Lucy Ikos	
2009	Underworld: Rise of the Lycans	Orsova	
2010	After the Waterfall	Joanna	
2016	The Light Between Oceans	Mrs. Hasluck	
2018	Adrift	Christine Crompton	
2024	The Moon Is Upside Down	Faith	

=== Television ===
Year	Title	Role	Notes
1985	Heart of the High Country	Miss Robertson	Episode: "1.3"
1989	The Shadow Trader	Margaret	Episode: "1.1"
1993	The Tommyknockers	Patricia McCardle	TV miniseries
1994	Hercules and the Lost Kingdom	Queen Omphale	TV film
1995	Hercules: The Legendary Journeys	Alcmene	Episodes: "The Wrong Path", "Ares", "The March to Freedom", "The Warrior Princess"
1995-1996	Shortland Street	Dr. Julia Thornton	Recurring Role
1998–1999	Hercules: The Legendary Journeys	Mary Contrary, Jocasta	Episodes: "Yes, Virginia, There Is a Hercules", "Rebel with a Cause"
1998–1999	Young Hercules	Hera (voice)	Recurring role
1999	Greenstone	Caroline	TV film
1999	Lawless	Susan Ellis	TV film
2000–2001	Cleopatra 2525	The Voice	Main role
2001	Xena: Warrior Princess	Newswoman	Episode: "Send in the Clones"
2001	Mercy Peak	Cushla Turbot	Episode: "History Lessons"
2001	Spin Doctors	Liz Brasch	TV series
2004	Raising Waylon	Harriet Caldwell	TV special
2004	Not Only But Always	Joan Rivers	TV film
2006	The Amazing Extraordinary Friends	Bev Lockjaw	Episode: "Nine Twenty Six"
2007	The Man Who Lost His Head	Eleanor Harrison	TV film
2007	The Adventures of Voopa the Goolash	Zoozoo	TV series
2007–2010	Outrageous Fortune	Ngaire Munroe	Recurring role (series 3–6)
2008	Kiss Me Deadly	Jillian	TV film
2008	Burying Brian	Rhonda Welch	Recurring role
2010	Legend of the Seeker	Prelate	Episodes: "Dark", "Perdition", "Creator"
2011–2014	Nothing Trivial	Anne	Recurring role (series 1–2), guest (series 3–4)
2015–2016, 2018	800 Words	Trish	Guest role
2016	Terry Teo	Mrs. Butterworth	Episodes: "A Penny for Your Troubles Parts 1 & 2"
2016	Power Rangers Dino Charge	Ms. Allister	Episode: "Recipe for Disaster"
2016–2017	Filthy Rich	Nancy Truebridge	Main role
2017	Wanted	Alice	Episodes: "2.3", "2.5", "2.6"
2019	I Don't Want A Herd	Ma Sheep (voice)	Animated series, Episode: "Lambkin"
2024	Dark City: The Cleaner	Evelyn Middleton	Supporting role

== Honours and awards ==
Hawthorne was appointed an Officer of the New Zealand Order of Merit, for services to the theatre, in the 2001 Queen's Birthday Honours.
