= Sophia Hawthorne (actress) =

New Zealand actress

- Born: 18 November 1976; New Zealand
- Died: 17 February 2016 (aged 39–40); New Zealand
- Occupation: Actress
- Years active: 1997–2016
- Relatives: Elizabeth Hawthorne (mother); Raymond Hawthorne (father); Emmeline Hawthorne (sister)

Sophia Hawthorne (18 November 1976 – 17 February 2016) was a New Zealand actress. She was the daughter of actors Elizabeth and Raymond Hawthorne, and sister of actress Emmeline Hawthorne.

In 2004 she starred in The Insider's Guide To Happiness, a New Zealand-produced drama series, and in 2005 she was seen in The Insider's Guide To Love.

She was born on 18 November 1976 and died on 17 February 2016 in New Zealand after a long battle with depression.

== Filmography ==
Film and television
Year	Title	Role	Notes
1997	The Bar		Short
1998	When Love Comes Along	Sally	
2000	Savage Honeymoon	Leesa Savage	
2000	She's Racing		Short
2002	Sunday	Janet	Episode: "17 November 2002"
2004	Fracture	Jasmine	
2004	The Insider's Guide to Happiness	Julie	Main role
2005	Auld Lang Syne	Isabelle	Short
2005	The Insider's Guide To Love	Julie	Episode: "The Power of Love"
2011	Bliss	Miss Puttnam	TV film

== Theatre ==
Year	Title	Role	Notes
1994	The Seagull	Nina	Auckland Theatre Company
2011	Poor Boy	Clare	Auckland Theatre Company
2015	Guys and Dolls	Adelaide	Auckland Theatre Company
