= Glenda Tuaine =

Glenda Tuaine is an event, arts producer and promoter based in Rarotonga. Tuaine is Company Director of Motone Productions, a creative production company based in Rarotonga, Aitutaki, Tahiti and Wellington, Aotearoa New Zealand. In 2019 Tuaine was awarded the Creative New Zealand Special Recognition Arts Pasifika Award. Tuaine is invested in the arts in the Cook Islands and produces tours for musicians, opera events, and has directed an award-winning short film about Cook Island artist Mike Tavioni.

== Biography ==
Tuaine's paternal grandfather was from Aitutaki.

In Aotearoa Tuaine was a theatre actor and director theatre, film and television, starting in the late 1980s. One play she wrote and directed was The Powder Room with Konstantina Tsinas, Julia Deans, Megan Peinell, Jason Ohlson, Greg Wikstrom, Karl Endemann, Johnny Mills, Maurice Newport & John Babe at BATS Theatre in 1998. Another she was in is The [abc] experiment also at BATS.

In 2001 she was in Home with Tanea Heke directed by Nina Nawalowalo and again working earlier with Heke in 1999 in Kitchen Tables, where Tuaine was directing. As she moved into producing and arts administration Tuaine had an event manager role at Te Papa. She was also the director of the New Zealand Fringe Festival. Tuaine worked at the New Zealand Festival of the Arts and was mentored by Carla van Zon. Other arts organisations in Aotearoa Tuaine has experience are the New Zealand International Comedy Festival and the New Zealand International Film Festival.

In broadcasting Tuaine has worked at Radio Active 89FM and is a contributor to the Radio New Zealand arts programmes, currently as a correspondent on the Cook Islands.

In 2004 / 2005 Tuaine moved from Aotearoa to the Cook Islands.

In 2005 she was in the feature film Futile Attraction about a reality dating show.

After moving to Rarotonga Tuaine has developed and produced the BCI Opera sponsored by the Bank of the Cook Islands (BCI) going since 2016. In 2019 this involved 10 artists in a showcase concert held under the Domes at the Auditorium.

Motone and Tuaine have developed a Pacific touring music circuit and artists include MMQ, Ladi 6, Bella Kalolo, Tiki Taane and Kora.

Tuanine was the marketing manager for Cook Island Tourism, and also did a stint as Acting CEO.

Tuaine has created artist residencies and artists who have participated include Murray Hickman of Strike and Fran Kora (of Kora). They toured Aotearoa and Tahiti.

In 2015 Tuaine made events in the 2015 Cook Islands Constitution Celebrations combining NZMACI and local artists in carving and weaving cultural exchange. Tuaine collaborated with South Pacific creatives 'to design the South Pacific component of the Edinburgh Military tattoo in Sydney Australia in November 2019'. Tuaine is part of producing the Through Our Lens cultural exchange with Maoriland Film Festival for young people film makers between the Cooks Islands and Aotearoa. Tuaine writes for Escape magazine.

A new initiative Tuanine is involved in is to represent the Cook Islands tourism in digital storytelling with Mana Tiaki.

As a filmmaker her first film was Taonga: An Artist Activist about carver, poet, mentor, activist and entrepreneur Mike Tavioni. It has won a number of awards including the Best Short Documentary at Brussels International Film Festival in 2022. The film was funded by Pacific Islanders in Communication, Creative New Zealand, Bank of the Cook Islands and crowd sourced with Give a Little. The film was mentored by Lala Rolls, (Aotearoa) and Karen Williams (Cook Island).

I say the creative sector is the future for the Cook Islands, we just need to create the proper ecosystem here for it to really flourish. (Glenda Tuaine, 2021)

Tuaine highlights the reliance on tourism for the Cook Islands as having 'horrific impacts' economically from the global COVID-19 pandemic and is promoting creative economy'.

== Awards ==
2019 - Special Recognition Award, Arts Pasifika Award, Creative New Zealand, to 'recognise special contribution to the standing, and standard, of Pacific arts in Aotearoa and/or internationally'.

== Personal ==
Tuaine is married to her partner in business Maurice (Mo) Newport.
