= Jane Yonge =

New Zealand theatre director

Jane Yonge is a New Zealand theatre director of Fijian and Chinese descent.

== Biography ==
Yonge grew up in Auckland. Her father is Fijian and her mother was Chinese-Fijian. Yonge's mother died when she was 23 years old and Yonge travelled to China to explore her mother's culture.

Yonge graduated from the University of Auckland in 2011 with a bachelor's degree in drama. In 2013 she moved to Wellington and studied theatre at Victoria University of Wellington and Toi Whakaari: New Zealand Drama School, graduating in 2015 with a master's degree of theatre arts in directing. In 2019 she studied in New York under a Fulbright Program award, graduating with a master's degree in arts politics from New York University Tisch School of the Arts.

== Career ==
Year	Production	Company	Role	Awards and nominations	Notes
2022	Scenes from a Yellow Peril	Auckland Theatre Company	Director		
2021	Slay the Dragon, Save the Dragon or Neither	BATS Theatre, Wellington	Director		
2019	A Fricken Dangerous Space-mas	Basement Theatre, Auckland	Director		
2018	At the Wake	Circa Theatre, Wellington	Director		
2017-2018	The Basement Tapes		Co-creator and director	Fringe First, Week One (Edinburgh Festival Fringe 2018) Best Performance Award - The Stage (Edinburgh Festival Fringe 2018) Melbourne Fringe Tour Ready Award (New Zealand Fringe Festival 2017) Best Director (Wellington Theatre Awards, 2017)	
2017-2018	WEiRdO	BATS Theatre, Wellington and Basement Theatre, Auckland	Director		
2016	Hetero-performative	Basement Theatre, Auckland	Director		
2016	Page Turners	New Zealand Festival	Director		
