= Raymond Hawthorne =

New Zealand theatre director (1936–025)

Raymond Hawthorne ONZM
- Born: Raymond Benjamin Thomas Hawthorne; 3 May 1936; Hastings, New Zealand
- Died: 5 April 2025 (aged 88); Auckland, New Zealand
- Education: Royal Academy of Dramatic Art
- Occupation: Theatre director
- Years active: 1950s–2025
- Spouse: Elizabeth Hawthorne
- Relatives: Emmeline Hawthorne (daughter); Sophia Hawthorne (daughter)

Raymond Benjamin Thomas Hawthorne ONZM (3 May 1936 – 5 April 2025) was a New Zealand theatre director, regarded as one of the country's most senior performing arts practitioners. Based in Auckland, he was founder of Theatre Corporate, director of the Mercury Theatre for seven years, and influential as a teacher and director over the many decades of his career.

== Background ==
Hawthorne grew up in Hawke's Bay. He used to ride a horse to his schooling at Pakipaki School (now Te Kura Pakipaki) and Hastings High School. At age five, he won a primary school singing competition judged by Emma Natzke, the mother of Russian New Zealand opera singer Oscar Natzka. He also performed with Hawke's Bay community opera and theatrical companies.

== Career ==
In 1955, Hawthorne became a member of the New Zealand Players, the nation's first major professional theatre company. It was directed by Richard Campion, father of filmmaker Jane Campion. Granted a government bursary in 1957, Hawthorne studied at the Royal Academy of Dramatic Art in London. Following graduation, he pursued a career as a performer but his interest moved towards directing and teaching. Returning to New Zealand in 1971, he joined the Mercury Theatre in Auckland under the directorship of Anthony Richardson.

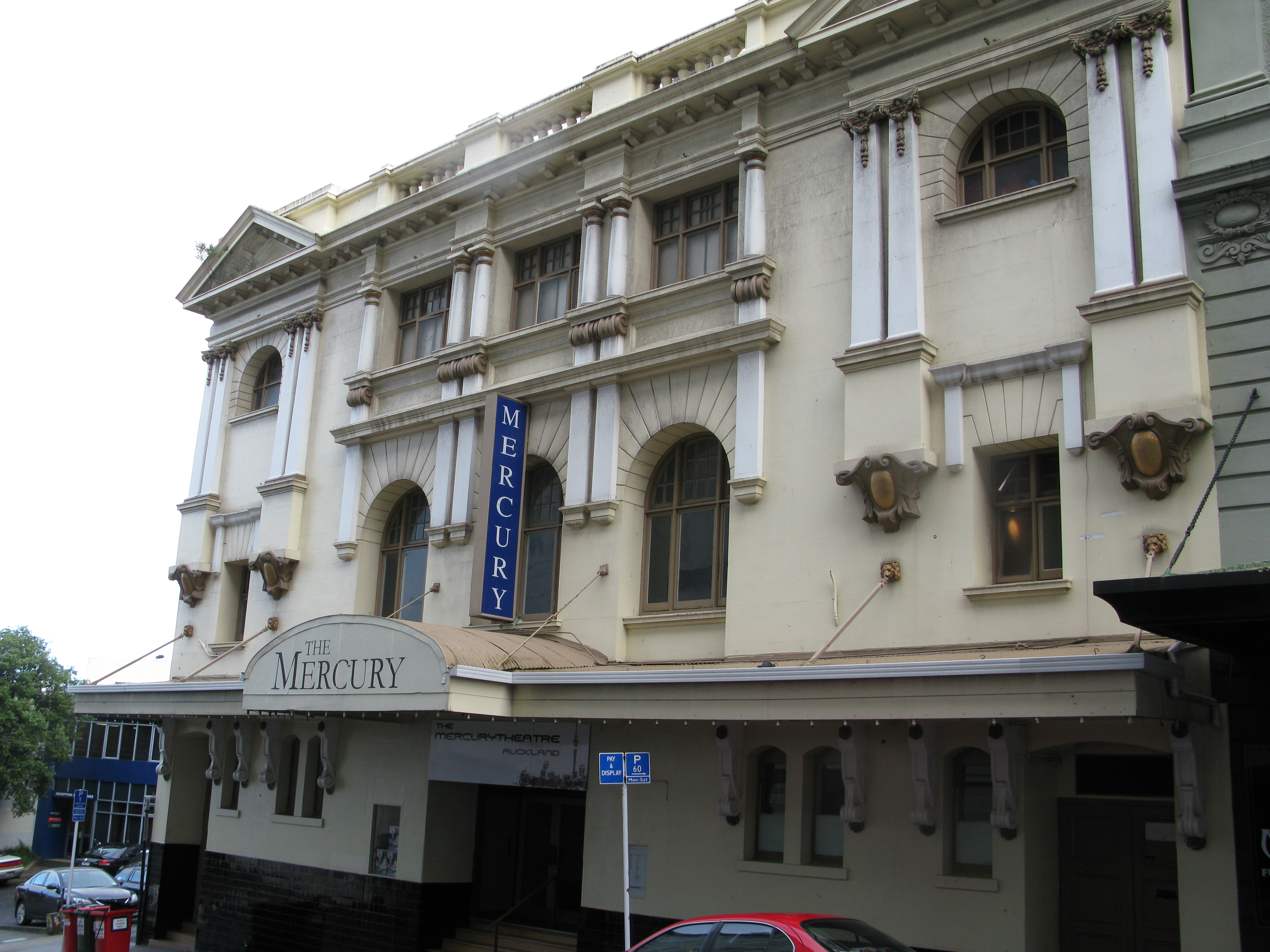
Mercury Theatre, Auckland, 2011

Hawthorne founded Theatre Corporate in 1974, a professional theatre company based in Auckland. The company helped bring to prominence such artists as Jennifer Ward-Lealand and Michael Hurst. Hawthorne remained director of the company until 1981. Theatre Corporate wound up in 1986. Theatre Corporate had a theatre in education arm called Story Theatre that toured Auckland and North Island primary and secondary schools.

In 1985, Hawthorne was appointed director of the Mercury Theatre, a position he retained for seven years. During his tenure, he directed numerous operas, musicals and plays. Hawthorne established an acting studio, The Actor's Space, in 1992. The same year, he also directed the first Auckland Theatre Company production, Lovelock's Dream Run by David Geary. This company rose from the ashes of the Mercury, which ceased operating in 1992.

Hawthorne directed many plays with Theatre Corporate including: The Fantastiks by Tom Jones, music by Harvey L Schmidt (1977); The Two Tigers by Brian McNeill (1977); Pygmalion by George Bernard Shaw (1978); A Doll's House by Henrik Ibsen (1979); Cabaret by John Kander; and Fred Ebb (1984).

In 1982, Hawthorne became director of the National Opera of New Zealand. He directed Brecht/ Weill's Rise and Fall of the City of Mahagonny and Benjamin Britten's The Turn of the Screw, but the company financially failed and closed soon after.

In 1997, Hawthorne became the head of the 'Directing and Writing for Theatre and Screen' major at Unitec Institute of Technology. He was appointed head of the School of Performing and Screen Arts in 2003.

Hawthorne acted in and directed Auckland Theatre Company productions including: Someone Who'll Watch Over Me; Travels With My Aunt; The Judas Kiss; Waiting for Godot; A Midsummer Night's Dream; The Crucible; and Roger Hall's Who Wants to be 100?.

In 2011, Hawthorne directed the inaugural production at Auckland's Q Theatre, Raise the Titanics. His other directing credits include Angels in America, Three Tall Women, The Herbal Bed, Julius Caesar, Cabaret, Into the Woods, Travesties, High Society, Oliver! and Guys and Dolls. He acted in film and television projects including Children of the Dog Star, Mortimer's Patch, Bread and Roses, Shortland Street and As Dreams Are Made On.

== Death and legacy ==
Hawthorne died at a retirement village in the Auckland suburb of Hillsborough on 5 April 2025, at the age of 88. Married to Elizabeth Hawthorne, he was the father of actresses Emmeline Hawthorne and Sophia Hawthorne.

== Honours and awards ==
In the 2000 Queen's Birthday Honours, Hawthorne was appointed an Officer of the New Zealand Order of Merit, for services to the theatre.
