= Danny Mulheron =

New Zealand actor, writer, and director

Danny Mulheron is a New Zealand actor, writer, and director who has worked in theatre, television and film.

Mulheron graduated from Toi Whakaari: New Zealand Drama School in 1983 with a Diploma in Acting.

In 2012, he directed Fresh Meat, a horror comedy film which was released in October 2012. In 2011 he directed Rage a television movie about the 1981 Springbok Tour, which was a Finalist in seven categories in the 2012 NZ Television Awards. In 2010 he co-wrote and directed The Motorcamp a stage play which is rumoured to have the 2nd to highest box office takings for a New Zealand play. In 2008 he co-directed with his wife and business partner, Sara Stretton, The Third Richard a feature-length documentary where he tells the story of his grandfather, a Jewish German composer whose music was banned by the Nazis, rejected in New Zealand and is now being rediscovered. In 2008 and 2010 he directed children's drama series, Paradise Cafe for CBBC, Emu for CBeebies and Time Trackers for Seven Network Australia.

In 2012 he was a finalist in the New Zealand Television Awards for Best Director Drama and in 2007 he was a finalist for Best Director Drama in the Qantas Awards. In 2005 Mulheron co-wrote, directed and produced the comedy series Seven Periods with Mr Gormsby, about an aging reactionary schoolteacher who gets a job working in a high school. The character began as a theatre piece, with Mulheron playing Gormsby. Melbourne Age critic Ray Cassin called the television version as "resolutely politically incorrect as it is possible for a television series to be".

The same year Mulheron directed the play The Tutor, written by his Gormsby co-writer Dave Armstrong. The play won the award for Outstanding New NZ Play at the Chapman Tripp Theatre Awards in 2005. Mulheron has acted in, written and directed award-winning plays for more than twenty years. He has also worked on plays with New Zealand novelist and scriptwriter Stephen Sinclair, and writer/cartoonist Tom Scott, another of the Gormsby co-writers.

Mulheron's career has seen him host a television show about automobiles, AA Torque Show, play the part (and piano) of Shostakovich in "Masterclass" at Circa Theatre and play a traumatised hippopotamus in Peter Jackson's Meet the Feebles, for which he was nominated for an award for best female performance. Mulheron was also responsible for writing some of the hippopotami dialogue, along with some of the other animals in the cast.

In 2018–2019, he directed Jonah, the two-part biopic about Jonah Lomu.
