= The Price of Milk =

2000 New Zealand film

- Directed by: Harry Sinclair
- Written by: Harry Sinclair
- Produced by: Fiona Copland
- Starring: Danielle Cormack; Karl Urban
- Cinematography: Leon Narbey
- Edited by: Cushla Dillon
- Production companies: New Zealand Film Commission; John Swimmer Productions
- Distributed by: Lot 47 Films
- Release dates: 13 September 2000 (New Zealand); 17 October 2000 (Australia); 3 November 2001 (United States)
- Running time: 89 minutes
- Languages: English; Spanish

The Price of Milk is a 2000 New Zealand romantic fantasy film. It was directed by New Zealand actor and director Harry Sinclair.

== Plot ==
In rural New Zealand, a farmer, Rob (Karl Urban), gets engaged to his love, Lucinda (Danielle Cormack). However, Lucinda is worried about their relationship losing its spark and she continues pushing him away to try to keep the spark alive.

A string of quilt thefts have been occurring around town and when Lucinda finds hers, she is curious and reckless when she trades Rob's cows, worth NZ$400,000, for it. Rob is beyond words in his rage and loses his voice as he drives away, leaving Lucinda to worry for days before their planned wedding.

Rob leaves Lucinda and sleeps in his truck. Soon he finds a tiny sandal left on the ground by mysterious entities known as "The Jackson's".

== Production ==
The Price of Milk was directed by New Zealand actor and director Harry Sinclair.

== Reception ==
An English reviewer called it "A weird but very funny little film, comparable in its bizarreness to Being John Malcovich(sic)."

== Awards ==
- Puchon Fantasy Film Festival, Grand Prize
- Tokyo Fantasy Film Festival, Grand Prize
- Mention, in the Jury Grand Prix, Best feature film, at the Rencontres internationales du cinéma des Antipodes (Antipodean Film Festival)
