= Jackson's Wharf =

- Created by: Gavin Strawhan; Rachel Lang
- Starring: Stephen Whittaker; Patrick Toomey; Nicola Kawana; Denise O'Connell; Sydney Jackson; Paul McLaughlin; Rema Smith; Brett Montgomery; Nicole Whippy; Robbie Magasiva; Clint Eruera; Daniel Meade; Elisa Ashenden; Morgan Fairhead; Nicko Vella; Dominique Crawford; Rachel E. Wallis; Peter Hammill; Sara Wiseman; Emmeline Hawthorne
- Composer: Graham Bollard
- Country of origin: New Zealand
- No. of seasons: 2
- No. of episodes: 72

Production
- Executive producers: John Barnett; Tony Holden; Gavin Strawhan; Rachel Lang
- Producers: Tony Holden; Sandra Clark
- Cinematography: Peter Janes
- Editors: Cameron Crawford; Eric de Beus
- Production company: South Pacific Pictures

Original release
- Network: TV2
- Release: 22 June 1999 – 16 February 2001

Jackson's Wharf (1999–2000) is a New Zealand television series created by Gavin Strawhan and Rachel Lang. Set in a fictional coastal town, the series told the story of a sibling rivalry between brothers Frank, the town policeman the younger brother, and Ben Jackson, a big-town lawyer. After inheriting the local pub from his recently deceased father, Ben returns to the small town with his family, with his arrival bringing its fair share of drama and conflict to the small township. Frank is married to Mahina who is part of a Māori family 'who go back on the peninsula long before any Jacksons arrived'.

Jackson's Wharf was produced by Tony Holden, Laurence Wilson and Sandra Clark with directors Murray Keane, John Callen, John Laing, Geoffrey Cawthorn and Niki Caro. The writing team included Rachel Lang, Gavin Strawhan, James Griffin, Niki Caro, David Geary, Steven Zanoski, Deborah Wilton, Nick Malmholt, Kate McDermott, Peter Allison, Miranda Wilson, Liddy Holloway, Maxine Fleming, Roy Ward, Paul Sonne, Jan Prettejohns and Ellen Driver. There were two seasons.

Cast member Nicola Kawana who played Mahina was described as a 'stand-out talent' in the show.

== Awards ==
1999 New Zealand Television Award: Best Drama Script
