= John Reid (New Zealand academic) =

New Zealand professor of English

John Cowie Reid (4 January 1916 – 31 May 1972) was a New Zealand academic. He was a professor of English and founding chairman of the Mercury Theatre.

== Biography ==
John Cowie Reid was born in Auckland, New Zealand on 4 January 1916. He was educated at Sacred Heart College and Auckland University College. After some time spent in various occupations, he became a secondary school teacher at Auckland Grammar School for short periods before and after the Second World War. From 1942 to 1946, he served with the New Zealand Military Forces, partly in the Army Education Service. He was active in musical, film, literary, and Roman Catholic organisations. In 1952–53 he engaged in research at the University of Wisconsin–Madison.

He was renowned as a superb lecturer, lively, cogent and persuasive. A man of great determination and energy, he was a noted broadcaster and a writer for periodicals. He was the founding chairman of the Mercury Theatre. From 1966 until its closure in 1992, the Mercury grew to become New Zealand's largest, most prolific professional theatre company.

Reid died prematurely, on 31 May 1972, leaving a wife, Joyce, six sons and a daughter.

== Principal publications ==
- A Book of New Zealand (1979)
- The Mind and Art of Coventry Patmore (1978)
- The Hidden World of Charles Dickens (1977)
- Bucks and Bruisers: Pierce Egan and Regency England (1971)
- Thomas Hood (1963)
- Francis Thompson, Man and Poet (1959)
- The Mind and Art of Coventry Patmore (1957)
- Creative Writing in New Zealand (1946)
