= The Insiders Guide to Happiness =

- Starring: Will Hall; Fasitua Amosa; Fraser Brown; Sophia Hawthorne; Samantha Jukes; Paolo Rotondo; Madeleine Sami
- Country of origin: New Zealand
- No. of episodes: 13

Production
- Producer: Dave Gibson
- Running time: 45m
- Production company: The Gibson Group

Original release
- Network: TV2
- Release: 19 May – 12 August 2004

The Insiders Guide To Happiness is a New Zealand drama series that explores the lives of a group of six previously unconnected people. Each life is connected by a bizarre car accident, the outcome of which forces them to examine and explore the happiness in their own lives. It aired in 2004 on TV2 and is currently syndicated in the United States on Vibrant TV Network. The series was followed by a prequel, The Insider's Guide To Love, with James the only character in common.

== Cast ==
- Will Hall – James
- Fasitua Amosa – Matthew
- Ben Barrington – William
- Fraser Brown – Sam
- Sophia Hawthorne – Julie
- Samantha Jukes – Tina
- Paolo Rotondo – Tim
- Madeleine Sami – Tess
- Sally Stockwell – Lindy
- Loren Horsley – Olive
- Jeremy Randerson – Grant

== Episode list ==
1. Is Happiness an Accident?
2. Who Controls Your Happiness?
3. Will the Truth Make You Happy?
4. What Are You Afraid Of?
5. Are You In Denial?
6. Do You Deserve To Be Happy?
7. What If You Could Start Over?
8. Will You Be Happy Tomorrow?
9. Who Taught You To Be Happy?
10. Being Happy is Being Who You Are
11. Does Happiness Grow Up?
12. Can You Embrace A New Life?
13. You Are Happy

== Awards ==
At the 2005 New Zealand Screen Awards, the show won the following seven awards:

- Best Drama Series
- Best Actor
- Best Supporting Actor
- Best Supporting Actress
- Best Script (Single Episode of a Drama Series or Serial)
- Best Directing (Drama/Comedy Programme)
- Best Original Music
