= Mercury Theatre, Auckland =

Theatre in Auckland, New Zealand

Mercury Theatre
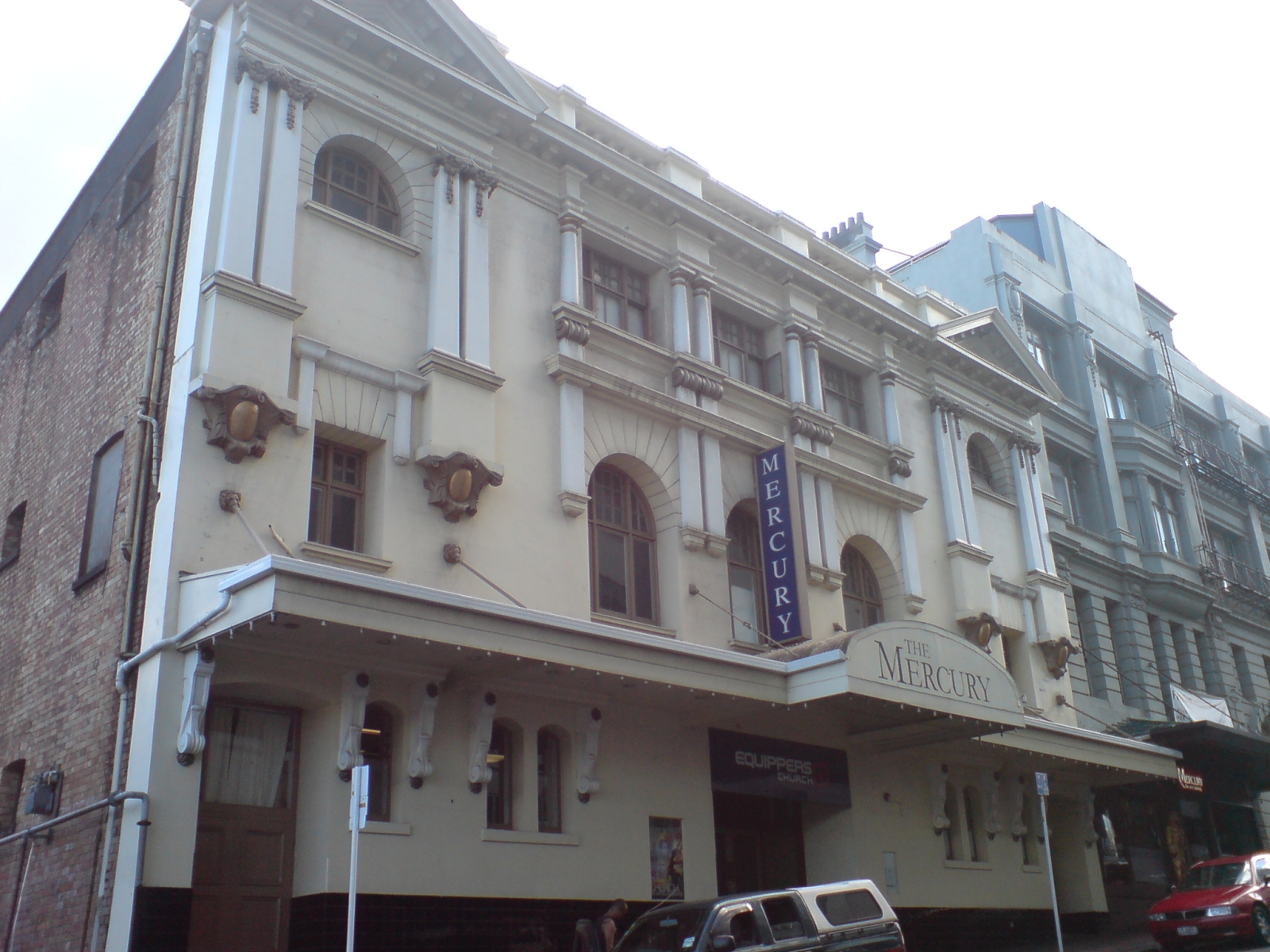
- The Mercury Theatre.

General information
- Type: Theatre, formerly a movie theatre.
- Architectural style: Edwardian Baroque architecture
- Location: Auckland, New Zealand, 9 Mercury Lane, Auckland
- Coordinates: 36.85821°S 174.75875°E
- Completed: 28 November 1910
- Renovated: 1926, 1956, and 1968
- Cost: £7,777

Design and construction
- Architect: Edward Bartley

Heritage New Zealand – Category 2
- Designated: 13-Dec-1990
- Reference no.: 5296

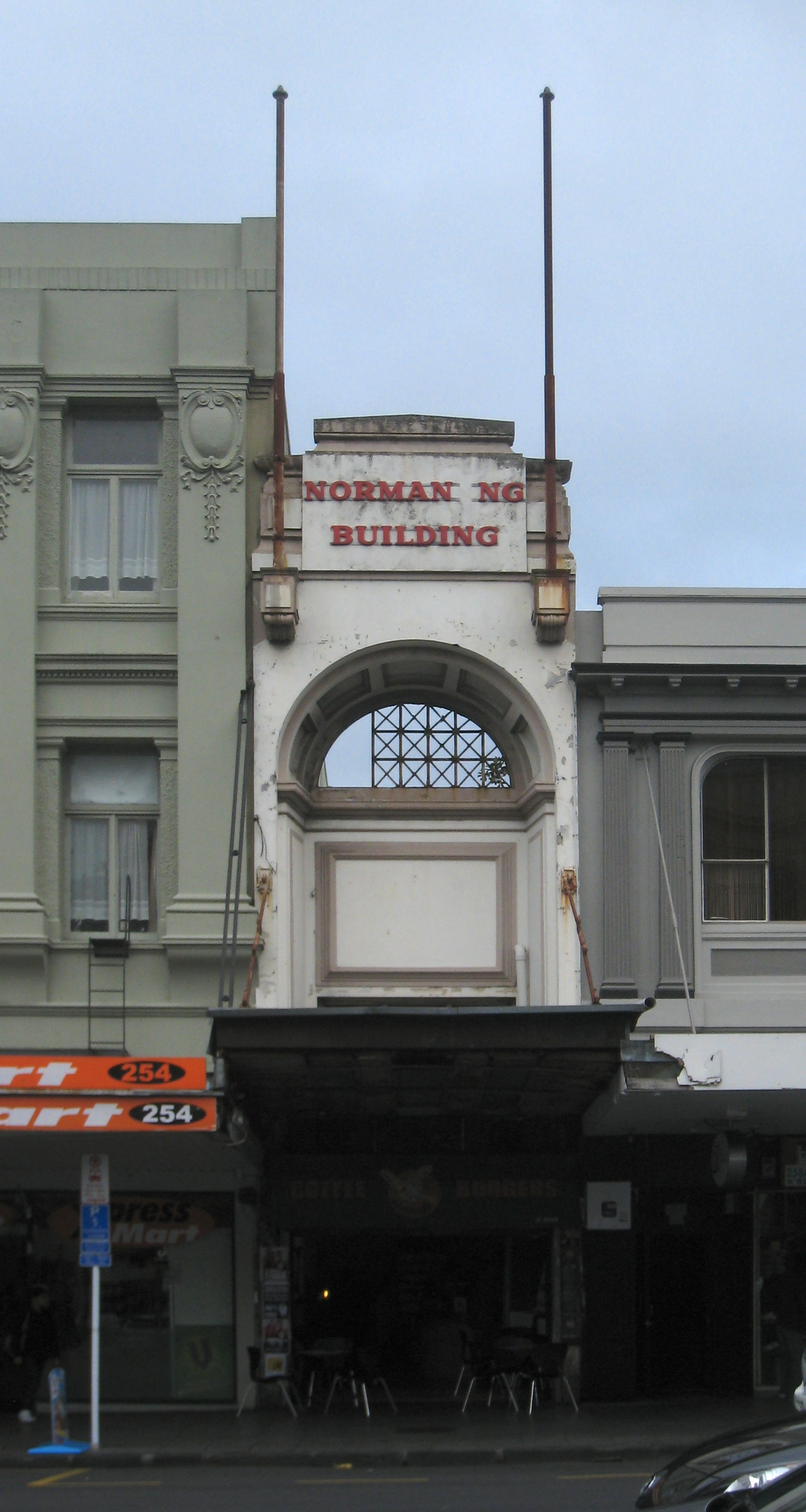
The Norman Ng Building, a former entrance to the Mercury Theatre, was retroactively added when it became clear that having an entrance to the nearby main street would be useful

The Mercury Theatre is a theatre in Auckland, New Zealand, located on Mercury Lane, off Karangahape Road. It was home to a theatre company of the same name for two decades. It was built in 1910 by the architect Edward Bartley and is the oldest surviving theatre in Auckland. Built in the Edwardian Baroque style, it was initially known as the Kings Theatre. On being converted into a cinema in 1926, a new entrance was built on Karangahape Road – this is now the Norman Ng Building. The building gained a Category II listing from Heritage New Zealand in 1990.

== History ==
From 1968 to 1991 it was the premises of the Mercury Theatre Company. In 1966 the Auckland Theatre Trust was established by Professor John C Reid. It raised finance to open the building as a professional theatre in 1968. The first production initiated by the theatre was The Admirable Crichton by J.M. Barrie. At least 12 productions were put on annually after this period ranging from children's pantomimes to serious tragedy-dramas including those by Shakespeare and Chekhov. Notable actors who performed at the theatre during their careers include Pam Ferris, Lee Grant, Roy Billing, George Henare, Michael Hurst and Ian Mune. Raymond Hawthorne joined the theatre in 1971 and worked as an actor, director and a tutor and became artistic director of the theatre in 1985 until its closure in 1992.

Although the theatre steadily attracted visitors, the extravagance of the theatre productions and running costs forced the Mercury Theatre as it was to close in 1992.

Following its closure, Symon Peters and David John Zam formed the company Mercury Playhouse Ltd. to acquire the theatre. They and its general Manager Frank Hobson described the present state of the Mercury building and the theatre's operation, and their plans for the property in an article published in the New Zealand Herald, March 17, 1994. Peters was a director of the City Wise group, which carried out a number of developments at New Lynn and in central Auckland. The group collapsed in 2001 and Symon left for Australia. The Peters family's property speculations and projects led various members into financial crises and subsequent scandals.

The records of the Mercury Theatre are now held at Auckland Libraries.

In November 2009 the Equippers Church, who bought the church in the early 2000s, put the building up for sale for 'upwards of' two million dollars. The church withdrew the theatre from the market in 2012. The church subsequently closed the theatre in April 2022 so that it can undergo significant renovations, to both strengthen and modernise the building as a whole, while creating new spaces, restoring it to its original capacity and maintaining the building's Edwardian character. The renovations are planned to finish in 2024.

== Production history ==
- 1968

The Admirable Crichton, Dark of the Moon, Alfie, Fings Ain't What They Used To Be, The Merchant of Venice, A Flea in her Ear, Wait Until Dark, Caucasian Chalk Circle, There's a Girl in my Soup, Lock Up Your Daughters, Winnie the Pooh

- 1969

An Evening of Mime with Francis Batten, Rosencrantz and Guildenstern are Dead, Under Milk Wood, Toad of Toad Hall, The Crucible, Teahouse of the August Moon, Lysistrata, Hamlet, A Farewell Performance by Francis Batten, Semi-Detached, Marat/Sade, Virtue in Danger, Irma la Douce, The Sun Rises in the West

- 1970

Hadrian, Earth and Sky, Alice in Wonderland, The Price, I Do! I Do!, Dames at Sea, The Ruling Class, The Birthday Party, Othello, Henry IV, Zorba, The National Health, Narrow Road to the Deep North

- 1971

The Hostage, The Lark, Prospect from the Park, The Magistrate, Tiki and Things That Go Bump, Peer Gynt, Oh What a Lovely War, As You Like It, Forget-Me-Not Lane, Sergeant Musgrave's Dance, The Country Wife, Canterbury Tales

- 1972

MacRune's Guevara, Conduct Unbecoming, Charley's Aunt, Kean, A Man for All Seasons, The Skin of our Teeth, Love's Laour's Lost, Threepenny Opera, Tom-Tom and the Happy Army, You Never Can Tell, There's a Leek in Your Hat, Lulu, Guys and Dolls

- 1973

Jumpers, Hay Fever, The Lady's Not For Burning, The Rocking Cave, The Owl and the Pussy Cat, Mister King Hongi, Butley, The Misanthrope, Macbeth, Lear, Annie Get Your Gun

- 1974

You Can't Take It with You, Macbeth, A Little Night Music, Saturday, Sunday, Monday, Heroes and Butterflies, Three Sisters, Jacques Brel, Absurd Person Singular, The Wizard of Oz, King Lear, Equus, Ground Level, The Sea Horse, Cabaret, An Evening with Katherine Mansfield

- 1975

Joseph and the Amazing Technicolor Dreamcoat, Elephant, London Assurance, Pinocchio's Travelling Circus, The Taming of the Shrew, A Marvellous Party, Travesties, The Mouse Man, Kiss Me Kate, Marieken

- 1976

Tarantara! Tarantara!, Happy Arcadia, Savages, Agincourt, Toad of Toad Hall, A Little Night Music, Otherwise Engaged, From Berlin to Broadway, The Duchess of Malfi, Chermin de fer, More Canterbury Tales

- 1977

Trumpets and Drums, Well Hung, The Last of the Knucklmen, Diary of a Madman, Cupid in Transit, Man of La Mancha, A Stretch of the Imagination, Blithe Spirit, Super Peg, Hello and Goodbye, Lost in the Stars, Mrs Kiwi Arthur, Glide Time, Julius Caesar, When You Comin' Back Red Ryder, The World of Good, Arsenic and Old Lace, Alpha Beta, A Funny Thing Happened on the Way to the Forum

- 1978

Royal Hunt of the Sun, Mrs Kiwi Arthur Present, The White Cliffs, Rattle of a Simple Man, Cole, Bullshot Crummond, The Cat and the Canary, The Merchant of Venice, Dirty Linen, New Found Land, Middle Age Spread, The Rivals, Ashes, Habeas Corpus, State of Revolution, Private Lives, The Good Doctor, Tomorrow will be a Lovely Day

- 1979

Cinderella, Something's Afoot, Henry IV Part I, Same Time Next Year, State of the Play, Old Kind Cole, Just Between Ourselves, Man Friday, The Naval Officer, Abigal's Party, The Club, Don Juan Comes Back from the War, Privates on Parade, Spider's Web, Writer's Cramp, The School for Scandal, Staircase, Home

- 1980

The Adventures of Robin Hood, Mime over Matter, Bedroom Farce, P and O – 1930, Uncle Vanya, Prisoners of Mother England, Mothers and Fathers, Godspell, A Midsummer Night's Dream, Comedians, Once a Catholic, Gershwin, A Life in the Theatre, Whose Life is it Anyway?, Just One Last Dance, The Boy Friend

- 1981

You're a Good Man Charlie Brown, Moby Dick Rehearsed, The Importance of Being Earnest, Stage Struck, Father's Day, 50/50, Bremen Coffee, Too Darn Hot, Brecht Songs, The Puny Little Life Show, The Taming of the Shrew, Potiphar's Wife, Between Night and Morning, Hancock's Last Half Hour, Flight of the Godwit, An Enemy of the People, Barbarians, Prisoners of Mother England, Middle Age Spread, Hosanna, Sauce for the Gander, The Immortalist, Glide Time, Bodies, Oliver!

- 1982

Aladdin, The Great Kiwi Concert Party, Noel and Cole, Blood of the Lamb, The Silver Screen Blues, Sooty, She Stoops to Conquer, St Mark's Gospel, The Bitter Tears of Petra von Kant, Once on Chunuk Bair, The Matchmaker, Einstein, Dracula, Secrets, Tomfoolery, Hot Water, Fresh Recovering Pleasures, Amadeus, Setting the Table, Foreskin's Lament, Cloud Nine, Snoopy, Jesus Christ Superstar, Ladies, Love and Life

- 1983

Armageddon Revisited, A Victorian Music Hall, Pygmallion, Demolition Job, The King and I, Pass the Butler, Objection Overruled, Madama Butterfly, Virginia, King of Hearts, L'elisir d'amore, On Our Selection, What's Entertainment, The Morning Tiger, Chicago, Tooth and Claw, Not About Heroes, Sister Mary Ignatius Explains It All For You, On the Razzle, Engaged, L'Italiana in Algeri, Fallen Angels

- 1984

Steaming, Insignificance, Who's Afraid of Virginia Woolf?, 'night Mother, The Real Thing, Summer, Rigoletto, Multiple Choice, Summit Conference, Masterpieces, Manon Lescaut, Footrot Flats, Noises Off, Pack of Women, Sweet Charity, Down an Alley Filled with Cats, The Pirates of Penzance, Loving Women, Ballad of Jonas Bones

- 1985

Hay Fever, A Stretch of the Imagination, Death of a Salesman, When the Wind Blows, The Rink, Ordinary Nights in Ward 10, Carmen, Out to Lunch, Agnes of God, Caravan, The Gospel according to Taane, Wild Honey, Coaltown Blues, Sweeney Todd, The Widowing of Mrs Holroyd, Change of Heart, Tosca, Side by Side, Camille, Say Thank-you to the Lady

- 1986

Major Barbara, Stepping Out, The Normal Heart, La Traviata, Bert and Maisie, Dream of Sussex Downs, The Song is You, West Side Story, Siamese Twins, School for Clowns, Tales of Hoffmann, The Winslow Boy, Conversations with a Fainthearted Feminist, Peter Pan: The Musical

- 1987

A Streetcar named Desire, Romeo and Juliet, Breaking the Code, The Mikado, The Sound of Music, Squatter, I'm Not Rappoport, Les liaisons dangereuses, Gershwin by George, Oedipus Rex, Ladies Night, Gypsy, The Kiss of the Spider Woman

- 1988

The Share Club, The Rivers of China, Bloodknot, Twelfth Night, Lucia di Lammermoor, The Homecoming, South Pacific, Burn This, Beauty and the Beast, Brighton Beach Memoirs, The Irving Berlin Show, Madam Butterfly, Nana, Rodgers and Hart, Frankie and Johnnie in the Clair de Lune, The Three Musketeers, Yerma, Ladies Night

- 1989

A View from the Bridge, The Cherry Orchard, Judy, Faust, Fiddler on the Roof, Courting Blackbird, A Doll's House, Mrs Klein, Our Country's Good, Don Giovanni, The Secret Rapture, The Rover, After the Crash, A Marvellous Party, La serva padrona and The impresario

- 1990

Hamlet, Oracles and Miracles, Shirley Valentine, The Sex Fiend, Turnadot, Carousel, This Joint is Jumpin', Cat on a Hot Tin Roof, Slice of Saturday Night, Single Spies, Ladies Night

- 1991

Amadeus, Beckett, Conjugal Rights, The Crucible, The Curse of the Wedgecombes, Jekyll and Hyde, M. Butterfly, The Merchant of Venice, A Pack of Girls, Porgy and Bess, Let's Do It, Private Lives, Rick's Bar in Casablanca, The Sex Fiend, Weed, Shadowlands, Via Satellite

- 1992

The Rose Tattoo, Glorious Ruins

- 1993

Don't Dress For Dinner
