= 2001 Nokia New Zealand Film Awards =

- Awarded for: Excellence in New Zealand film
- Sponsored by: Nokia
- Date: 10 November 2001
- Location: St James Theatre, Wellington
- Country: New Zealand
- Presented by: New Zealand Academy of Film and Television Arts

The 2001 Nokia New Zealand Film Awards were held on 10 November 2001 at the St James Theatre in Wellington, New Zealand. To better suit the release schedule of the film industry, the date of the awards ceremony was moved from a mid-year date of previous years to November. The awards were presented by the New Zealand Academy of Film and Television Arts and sponsored by Nokia New Zealand who also sponsored the Nokia New Zealand Film Awards Scholarship, awarded to a film student. The awards presentation featured a tribute to director John O'Shea.

== Nominees and winners ==
Prizes were awarded in 21 categories. Road move Snakeskin won with most awards, with six, while Stickmen won four.

Best Film

- Snakeskin, Vanessa Sheldrick
  - Stickmen, Michelle Turner
  - Rain, Philippa Campbell, John Toon, Robin Scholes

Best Director

- Hamish Rothwell, Stickmen
  - Gillian Ashurst, Snakeskin
  - Christine Jeffs, Rain

Best Actor

- Scott Wills, Stickmen
  - Karl Urban, The Irrefutable Truth about Demons
  - Temuera Morrison, Crooked Earth

Best Actress

- Sarah Peirse, Rain
  - Melanie Lynskey, Snakeskin
  - Vicky Haughton, Her Majesty

Best Supporting Actor

- Alistair Browning, Rain
  - Paul Glover, Snakeskin
  - Lawrence Makoare, Crooked Earth

Best Supporting Actress

- Luanne Gordon, Stickmen
  - Nancy Brunning, Crooked Earth
  - Liddy Holloway, Her Majesty

Best Juvenile Performer

- Alicia Fulford-Wierzbicki, Rain
  - Emily Barclay, No One Can Hear You
  - Sally Andrews, Her Majesty

Best Screenplay

- Stickmen, Nick Ward
  - Snakeskin, Gillian Ashurst
  - The Irrefutable Truth about Demons, Glen Standring

Best Cinematography

- Snakeskin, Donald Duncan
  - Stickmen, Nigel Bluck
  - Rain, John Toon

Best Editing

- Snakeskin, Cushla Dillon and Marcus Darcy
  - The Irrefutable Truth about Demons, Paul Sutorius
  - Stickmen, Owen Ferrier-Kerr

Best Original Music

- Snakeskin, Leyton & Joost Langveld
  - Exposure, Bruce Lynch
  - Crooked Earth, James Hall

Best Contribution to a Soundtrack

- Snakeskin, Dave Whitehead
  - Stickmen, Mike Hedges
  - Her Majesty, Tony Johnson

Best Make-Up

- Her Majesty, Debra East
  - Snakeskin, Vanessa Hurley
  - The Irrefutable Truth about Demons, Kareen Donalson
  - Stickmen, Debra East

Best Costume Design

- Her Majesty, Lesley Burke-Harding
  - Stickmen, Nic Smillie
  - Rain, Kirsty Cameron

Best Design

- Her Majesty, Kim Sinclair
  - Stickmen, Neville Stevenson
  - Rain, Kirsty Clayton

Best Computer Generated Images

- Snakeskin, Peter Hurnard
  - The Irrefutable Truth about Demons, Nigel Streeter
  - Stickmen, Oktober

Best Digitally Mastered Feature Film

- The Waiting Game, Robert Rowe and Cristobal Araus Lobos
  - The Shirt, John Laing and Ross Bevan
  - Back River Road, Peter Tait

Best Short Film

- Junk, Greg King
  - Falling Sparrows, Murray Keane
  - Camping With Camus, Alan Erson

Best Script for Short Film

- Cow, Michael Bennett
  - Falling Sparrows, Murray Keane
  - Room Tone, Charlie McClellan

Best Technical Contribution to Short Film

- Junk, John Chrystoffels
  - Cow, Robert Gillies
  - Like An Angel, Dave Whitehead

Best Performance in a Short Film

- Jonathan Hardy, Camping With Camus
  - Lee Hartley, A New Way Home
  - Jed Brophy, Room Tone
