= List of New Zealand film makers =

The following is a list of New Zealand film makers.

== International directors ==
Name	Notable titles	Other
Andrew Adamson	Shrek 1 and 2, The Narnia film series	Academy Award nominee
Martin Campbell	Casino Royale, The Mask of Zorro, GoldenEye	BAFTA winner
Jane Campion	The Piano, Holy Smoke!	Academy Award winner
Richard Curtis	Love Actually, Bridget Jones's Diary (writer)	BAFTA winner, Academy Award nominee
Winston Cowie	Zayed's Antarctic Lights, Our Sea. Our Heritage, Wild Abu Dhabi: The Turtles of Al Dhafra	New York Festivals TV and Film Awards
Roger Donaldson	Species, Worlds Fastest Indian Dante's Peak, Cocktail, The Recruit	Golden Palm nominee
Ellory Elkayem	Eight Legged Freaks	
Peter Jackson	Bad Taste, The Frighteners, Heavenly Creatures, The Lord of the Rings film trilogy, King Kong, the Hobbit trilogy	9 time Academy Award nominee, three of which he won.
Gerard Johnstone	M3GAN, Housebound (2014 film)	
Geoff Murphy	Utu, Under Siege II, Goodbye Pork Pie	
Andrew Niccol	Lord of War, Gattaca, The Truman Show (writer)	BAFTA winner, Academy Award nominee
David Sims	The Truth About Tangiwai, Painting in an Empty Land, Mystery at Midge Bay	Gold Houston International Film Festival
Lee Tamahori	Once Were Warriors, Die Another Day, Along Came a Spider, xXx: State of the Union, The Devil's Double	
Vincent Ward	River Queen, Map of the Human Heart, What Dreams May Come	2 time Golden Palm nominee
Niki Caro	Whale Rider, North Country	BAFTA winner
Taika Waititi	Boy, Two cars, one night, Hunt for the Wilderpeople, Jojo Rabbit, Thor: Ragnarok	Academy Award winner, BAFTA winner

== Domestic directors ==
Name	Notable For
Murray Ball	Footrot Flats: The Dog's Tale
Barry Barclay	Ngati
Michael Bennett	Matariki
Paul Campion	The Devil's Rock
Ben Hawker	Blackspot
Jonathan King	Black Sheep
Paul Maunder	Sons for the Return Home
Brad McGann	In My Father's Den
James Napier Robertson	The Dark Horse
Robert Sarkies	Out of the Blue, Scarfies
Glenn Standring	Perfect Creature, The Irrefutable Truth about Demons
Mika X	GURL

== Producers ==
- Barbara Sumner Burstyn
- Philippa Campbell
- Winston Cowie
- Ainsley Gardiner
- Libby Hakaraia
- Charles Knight
- Larry Parr
- Fran Walsh

== New Zealand at the Academy Awards ==
New Zealand film makers have won a total of sixteen Oscars at the US Film Academy Awards from 41 nominations. Eleven wins were for work on the Lord of the Rings film trilogy. The first New Zealand nomination was in 1958 for Snows of Aorangi with New Zealand's first wins coming in 1994 for The Piano. 1994

=== Winners and nominees ===
Year	Category	Film	Result	Recipient
1958	Best Short Subject (Live Action)	Snows of Aorangi	Nominated	–
1964	Best Documentary (Short)	140 Days Under the World	Nominated	–
1980	Best Adapted Screenplay	Breaker Morant	Nominated	Jonathan Hardy
1987	Best Short Film (Animated)	The Frog, the Dog and the Devil	Nominated	Bob Stenhouse, Hugh Macdonald & Martin Townsend
1994	Best Director	The Piano	Nominated	Jane Campion
1994	Best Supporting Actress	The Piano	Won	Anna Paquin
1994	Best Original Screenplay	The Piano	Won	Jane Campion
1995	Best Original Screenplay	Four Weddings and a Funeral	Nominated	Richard Curtis
1995	Best Original Screenplay	Heavenly Creatures	Nominated	Peter Jackson and Fran Walsh
1999	Best Original Screenplay	The Truman Show	Nominated	Andrew Niccol
1999	Best Actor	The Insider	Nominated	Russell Crowe
2001	Best Actor	Gladiator	Won	Russell Crowe
2002	Best Makeup	The Lord of the Rings: The Fellowship of the Ring	Won	Richard Taylor
2002	Best Visual Effects	The Lord of the Rings: The Fellowship of the Ring	Won	Richard Taylor
2002	Best Adapted Screenplay	The Lord of the Rings: The Fellowship of the Ring	Nominated	Peter Jackson, Fran Walsh and Phillipa Boyens
2002	Best Art Direction/Set Direction	The Lord of the Rings: The Fellowship of the Ring	Nominated	Dan Hennah & Grant Major
2002	Best Costume Design	The Lord of the Rings: The Fellowship of the Ring	Nominated	Richard Taylor & Ngila Dickson
2002	Best Director	The Lord of the Rings: The Fellowship of the Ring	Nominated	Peter Jackson
2002	Best Editing	The Lord of the Rings: The Fellowship of the Ring	Nominated	John Gilbert
2002	Best Picture	The Lord of the Rings: The Fellowship of the Ring	Nominated	Peter Jackson and Fran Walsh
2002	Best Sound	The Lord of the Rings: The Fellowship of the Ring	Nominated	Hammond Peek
2002	Best Actor	A Beautiful Mind	Nominated	Russell Crowe
2003	Best Art Direction/Set Decoration	The Lord of the Rings: The Two Towers	Nominated	Dan Hennah & Grant Major
2003	Best Editing	The Lord of the Rings: The Two Towers	Nominated	Michael Horton
2003	Best Picture	The Lord of the Rings: The Two Towers	Nominated	Peter Jackson and Fran Walsh
2004	Best Adapted Screenplay	The Lord of the Rings: The Return of the King	Won	Peter Jackson, Fran Walsh and Phillipa Boynes
2004	Best Art Direction	The Lord of the Rings: The Return of the King	Won	Dan Hennah and Grant Major
2004	Best Costume Design	The Lord of the Rings: The Return of the King	Won	Ngila Dickson and Richard Taylor
2004	Best Director	The Lord of the Rings: The Return of the King	Won	Peter Jackson
2004	Best Editing	The Lord of the Rings: The Return of the King	Won	Jamie Selkirk
2004	Best Original Song	The Lord of the Rings: The Return of the King	Won	Fran Walsh
2004	Best Makeup	The Lord of the Rings: The Return of the King	Won	Richard Taylor
2004	Best Picture	The Lord of the Rings: The Return of the King	Won	Peter Jackson and Fran Walsh
2004	Best Sound Mixing	The Lord of the Rings: The Return of the King	Won	Michael Hedges and Hammond Peek
2004	Best Actress	Whale Rider	Nominated	Keisha Castle-Hughes
2004	Best Costume Design	The Last Samurai	Nominated	Ngila Dickson
2005	Best Animated Feature Film	Shrek 2	Nominated	Andrew Adamson
2005	Best Short Film	Two Cars, One Night	Nominated	Taika Cohen and Ainsley Gardener
2006	Best Visual Effects	King Kong	Won	Richard Taylor and Christian Rivers
2006	Best Sound Mixing	King Kong	Won	Michael Hedges and Hammond Peek
2006	Best Sound Editing	King Kong	Won	Mike Hopkins and Ethan Van der Ryn
2006	Best Art Direction	King Kong	Nominated	Dan Hennah, Grant Major and Simon Bright
2006	Best Sound Mixing	The Chronicles of Narnia: The Lion, the Witch and the Wardrobe	Nominated	Tony Johnson
2008	Best Picture	Atonement	Nominated	Tim Bevan
2010	Best Art Direction	Avatar	Won	Kim Sinclair
2010	Best Picture	District 9	Nominated	Peter Jackson
2012	Best Original Song	The Muppets	Won	Bret McKenzie
2013	Best Art Direction	The Hobbit: An Unexpected Journey	Nominated	Dan Hennah, Grant Major and Simon Bright
2013	Best Picture	Les Misérables	Nominated	Tim Bevan
2014	Best Sound Mixing	The Hobbit: The Desolation of Smaug	Nominated	Michael Hedges
2015	Best Adapted Screenplay	The Theory of Everything	Nominated	Anthony McCarten
2023	Best Sound Mixing	Avatar: The Way of Water	Nominated	Michael Hedges

== Special effects ==
Richard Taylor, who is the head of Weta Workshop, has won a notable number of awards for his work on the Lord of the Rings film trilogy and King Kong. Currently, he holds one of the largest Academy Award Collections.
