= 2003 New Zealand Film Awards =

- Awarded for: Excellence in New Zealand film
- Sponsored by: New Zealand Trade and Enterprise
- Date: 8 December 2003
- Location: Auckland
- Country: New Zealand
- Presented by: New Zealand Film Commission

The 2003 New Zealand Film Awards were held on 8 December 2003 in Auckland. After there had been no New Zealand film awards in 2002, previous organiser the New Zealand Academy of Film and Television Arts had originally announced its intention to again host a film awards for 2003, but later withdrew, claiming insufficient sponsorship to stage the awards. However, a group from the film industry, led by the New Zealand Film Commission and government agency New Zealand Trade and Enterprise, raised enough sponsorship to host the awards.

Feature film Whale Rider dominated the awards with nine wins, and short film Two Cars, One Night won three of the four short film prizes.

== Nominees and winners ==
There were 16 feature film categories, five digital feature categories and four short film categories. This was the first time that digital film was acknowledged in a New Zealand film award.

=== Feature film ===
Best Film

- Whale Rider
  - Kombi Nation
  - Nemesis Game

Best Director

- Niki Caro, Whale Rider
  - Grant Lahood, Kombi Nation
  - Jesse Warn, Nemesis Game

Best Actor

- Waihoroi Shortland, The Maori Merchant of Venice
  - Jason Whyte, Kombi Nation
  - Rawiri Paratene, Whale Rider

Best Actress

- Keisha Castle-Hughes, Whale Rider
  - Michelle Langstone, For Good
  - Kate Elliott, Toy Love

Best Supporting Actor

- Cliff Curtis, Whale Rider
  - Te Rangihau Gilbert, The Maori Merchant of Venice
  - Grant Roa, Whale Rider

Best Supporting Actress

- Vicky Haughton, Whale Rider
  - Miranda Harcourt, For Good
  - Veeshayne Armstrong, The Maori Merchant of Venice

Best Juvenile Performer

- Mana Taumanu, Whale Rider
  - Anneke-Lee Gough, For Good

Best Screenplay

- Niki Caro, Whale Rider
  - Grant Lahood, Jason Whyte, Loren Horsley, Gentiane Lupi, Genevieve McClean, Kombi Nation
  - Jesse Warn, Nemesis Game

Best Cinematography

- Aaron Morton, Nemesis Game
  - Davorin Fahn, The Maori Merchant of Venice
  - Leon Narbey, Whale Rider

Best Editing

- Bruce Lange, Nemesis Game
  - Margot Francis, Toy Love
  - David Coulson, Whale Rider

Best Original Score

- Lisa Gerrard, Whale Rider
  - Clive Cockburn and Hirini Melbourne, The Maori Merchant of Venice
  - Victoria Kelly and Joost Langeveld, Toy Love

Best Contribution to a Soundtrack

- Tim Prebble, Dave Whitehead, Gethin Greagh, The Locals
  - Frank Ilfman, Nemesis Game
  - Tim Prebble, Toy Love

Best Design

- Peter Cosco, Nemesis Game
  - Guy Moana, The Maori Merchant of Venice
  - Grant Major, Whale Rider

Best Costume Design

- Kirsty Cameron, Whale Rider
  - Gavin McClean, The Maori Merchant of Venice
  - Shelley Mansell, Nemesis Game

Best Makeup

- Barbara Barkey, Nemesis Game
  - Annie Single, The Maori Merchant of Venice
  - Denise Kum, Whale Rider

Lifetime Achievement Award

- Don Selwyn

=== Digital Feature ===
Best Digital Feature

- Christmas, Leanne Saunders and Gregory King
  - Orphans and Angels, Harold Brodie
  - Woodenhead, Florian Habicht

Best Performance

- Darien Takle, Christmas
  - Emmeline Hawthorne, Orphans and Angels
  - Stephen Lovatt, This Is Not A Love Story

Best Script

- Gregory King, Christmas
  - Harold Brodie, Orphans and Angels
  - Keith Hill, This Is Not A Love Story

Best Technical Contribution

- Caroline Falgan, Art Director, Christmas
  - Ian Beale, Cinematography, Orphans and Angels
  - Christopher Pryor, Director of Photography and co-editor, Woodenhead

Special Jury Prize

- Christopher Brown for his role in Orphans and Angels

=== Short film ===
Best Short Film

- Beautiful, Adam Stevens
  - The French Doors, Steve Ayson
  - Two Cars, One Night, Taika Waititi

Best Performance

- Rangi Ngamoki, Two Cars, One Night
  - Peter Feeney, The Platform
  - Jason Hoyte, Beautiful

Best Script

- Taika Waititi, Two Cars, One Night
  - Daniel Strand, Playing A Role
  - Wiremu Grace, Turangawaewae

Best Technical Contribution

- Adam Clarke, Cinematography, Two Cars, One Night
  - Michael Lucas, Digital Visual Effects, Kitty
  - Dave Whitehead, Music Composition, The Platform
