= Snakeskin (film) =

2001 film by Gillian Ashurst

- Theatrical release poster
- Directed by: Gillian Ashurst
- Written by: Gillian Ashurst
- Produced by: Vanessa Sheldrick
- Starring: Melanie Lynskey; Boyd Kestner; Dean O'Gorman; Oliver Driver
- Cinematography: Donald Duncan
- Edited by: Marcus D'Arcy; Cushla Dillon
- Music by: Joost Langeveld and Leyton
- Production companies: CowGirl Productions; New Zealand Film Commission; Portman Productions
- Release dates: May 2001 (Cannes Film Market); 11 October 2001 (New Zealand)
- Running time: 94 minutes
- Country: New Zealand
- Language: English

Snakeskin is a 2001 New Zealand road thriller film directed by Gillian Ashurst and starring Melanie Lynskey. It was released theatrically in New Zealand on 11 October 2001. Despite not receiving an official release in the United States or the UK, it has played on television in both territories and amassed a cult following.

== Premise ==
Craving that "American adventure" she's seen so often in the movies, starry-eyed Alice (Melanie Lynskey) sets out on a road trip across New Zealand with her lovesick best friend, Johnny (Dean O'Gorman). Things take a devilish turn when they pick up the enchanting but dangerous Seth (Boyd Kestner), a Texan hitchhiker fleeing a posse of irate skinheads (led by Oliver Driver) and a pair of vengeful drug dealers.

== Cast ==
- Melanie Lynskey as Alice
- Boyd Kestner as Seth
- Dean O'Gorman as Johnny
- Oliver Driver as Speed
- Paul Glover as Terry
- Charlie Bleakley as Owen
- Gordon Hatfield as Tama
- Taika Waititi as Nelson
- Jodie Rimmer as Daisy
- Jacob Tomuri as Robbie

== Production ==
=== Writing ===
The script was inspired by Ashurst's own experience of growing up in Canterbury: "There was always that sense that you wanted to go somewhere else ... On the surface it felt quite safe, but once I became a teenager and started going to parties, I learnt that Christchurch has quite an underbelly. Skinheads were quite a thing around town back then. They were always breaking up our parties and beating people up ... I wanted to confront that [in the film]". She cited Badlands, Bonnie and Clyde, and Goodbye Pork Pie as some of Snakeskin's artistic influences.

=== Filming ===
Snakeskin was filmed in and around Methven, New Zealand. Ashurst felt the shoot had "a certain magic about it ... it was pretty intense", while acknowledging, "It didn't really fit what they say to do with your first feature, which is to keep it small. [Instead] we were doing a road movie with visual effects, explosions and stunts".

While the bulk of the film's action takes place on the road, with Lynskey's character doing the majority of the driving, the actress herself was unable to drive at the time of shooting.

== Release and reception ==
After debuting at the Cannes Film Market in May 2001, Snakeskin was released theatrically in New Zealand on 11 October 2001. The film performed averagely at the box office, but was well received by critics. Bill Gosden, director of the New Zealand International Film Festival, called it "bold, funny, sexy and macabre", further commending the acting and cinematography. In a more mixed appraisal, Variety's David Stratton felt that Melanie Lynskey was "excellent" in the lead role, while noting, "The first half of [this] Kiwi road movie promises much, but a spiral into death and violence toward the end, and a supernatural twist that doesn't really work, spoil what is mostly a pacy and, for a while, exciting yarn".

Snakeskin went on to receive six prizes at the 2001 New Zealand Film Awards.

== Accolades ==
- 2002 AFI Fest, Los Angeles
  - Nominated: Grand Jury Prize
- 2001 New Zealand Film Awards
  - Winner: Best Film, Best Cinematography, Best Computer-Generated Images, Best Editing, Best Original Music (Joost Langeveld and Leyton), Best Contribution to a Soundtrack (Dave Whitehead)
  - Nominated: Best Actress (Lynskey), Best Director, Best Screenplay, Best Makeup, Best Supporting Actor (Glover)
