= Katie Wolfe =

New Zealand actress and director

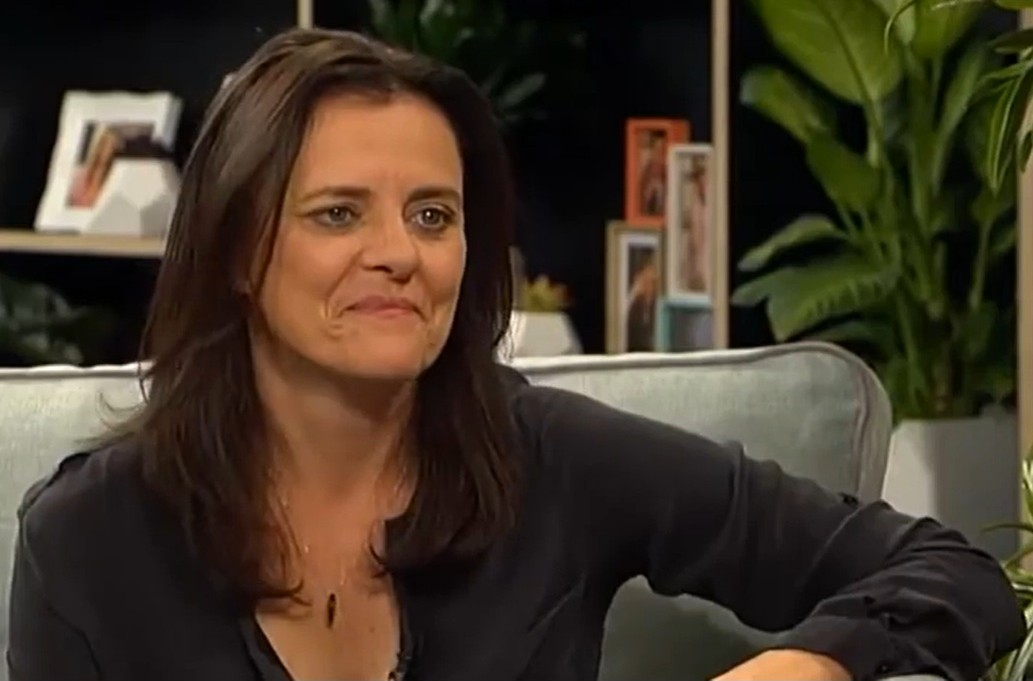
Wolfe in 2017

Katie Wolfe (born 1968) is an actor, film and stage director from New Zealand. She appeared in television series including Marlin Bay (1990s), Shortland Street (late 1990s), and Mercy Peak (2000 - 2001). Her screen directing work has won awards, including Redemption at the ImagineNative Film + Media Arts Festival and This Is Her at the Prague International Short Film Festival. Wolfe wrote and directed a stage play, The Haka Party Incident that was presented in 2023 in New Zealand.

== Biography ==
Katie Wolfe, the daughter of Neil Wolfe and Raewyn Wolfe, was born in New Plymouth in 1968, she has three siblings. Wolfe is Māori and is affiliated with the Taranaki iwi Ngāti Mutunga and Ngāti Tama. After enrolling at Victoria University of Wellington in 1986, she graduated with a BA in English, and stayed in Wellington to study at Toi Whakaari: New Zealand Acting School, graduating in 1990.

== Career ==
=== Acting ===
Wolfe's first professional acting job was at Dunedin's Fortune Theatre, followed by the role of presenter for several episodes of NHNZ's children's nature series Wild Track.

Her first television role, as Ginny Gannaway on the series Marlin Bay, was in 1992 began in 1992 and lasted three years. Her feature film debut came in the New Zealand film The Last Tattoo (1994), a murder mystery set in Wellington during World War II directed by John Reid and starring Rod Steiger and Tony Goldwyn along with a large cast of established and soon to be established local actors, including Tim Balme, Danielle Cormack, Kerry Fox, and Robyn Malcolm.

=== Directing and writing ===
Like other actors associated with Shortland Street, Wolfe directed episodes of that program. Her first two films, the short films This is Her (2008) and Redemption (2010), both premiered at Sundance, and then screened at other international festivals including Telluride (USA), the Berlinale (Germany), the Melbourne International Film Festival, the San Tropez Antipodes Film Festival (France) and the New York Film Festival. Her first feature-length film, titled Kawa (2010), is an adaptation of Witi Ihimaera's book, Nights in the Gardens of Spain.

Wolfe joined eight other Māori women to direct the omnibus film Waru (2017), comprising eight 10-minute segments of events circling around the tangi of a boy named Waru. After its debut at the 2017 New Zealand International Film Festival, Waru screened at the Toronto Film Festival and ImagineNATIVE festivals.

Wolfe's work as a theatre director includes The Haka Party Incident, a verbatim play about race relations based on a confrontation that occurred between Māori activists and a group of engineering students doing a mock haka at the University of Auckland in 1979. Wolfe, also the author, presented an early version in 2017, leading to its being programmed by a number of festivals throughout New Zealand (Te Tairāwhiti Festival, Auckland Festival, Tauranga Arts Festival, RESET Festival in Taranaki, Nelson Arts Festival) that were affected by Covid 19 restrictions. It premiered in 2021 and toured New Zealand in 2023 presented at the Kia Mau Festival, Wellington; Sir Howard Morrison Centre, Rotorua; Taranaki Arts Festival, New Plymouth; Te Tairāwhiti Arts Festival, Gisborne; Tauranga Festival and the Court Theatre in Christchurch. Critic Nga-Atawhainga Hineāmore said of the play: "...having the actors performing the haka both as a farce and in its full and rightful glory proves to be a strongly emotive way of tracking the obvious social and cultural divide." The play was produced as a documentary film The Haka Party Incident in 2024, due for release on or about 30 January 2025.

== Filmography - screen credits ==
=== Film ===
Year	Title	Role	Notes
1994	The Last Tattoo	Rose Mitchell	
1994	La vie en rose	Audrey Foggin	
1995	Lemming Aid		Short
1996	Planet Man	E.T.	short
2000	The Irrefutable Truth About Demons	Bennie	
2011	The Off Season		Short
2016	Ukaipo Whenua		Short

=== Television ===
Year	Title	Role	Notes
1992	Marlin Bay	Ginny Gannaway	TV series
1992	The Ray Bradbury Theater	Anna (age 18-22)	"Some Live Like Lazarus"
1996	Cover Story		TV series
1997-99	Shortland Street	Dr. Bridget Hastings	Regular role
1999	Duggan	Brenda Marshall	"Food to Die For"
1999	Hercules: The Legendary Journeys	Arciana	"Be Deviled"
2001-03	Mercy Peak	Amanda Masefield	Recurring role
2016	The Brokenwood Mysteries	Nicole	"The Black Widower"

=== Other work ===
Year	Title	Notes
2003-07	Shortland Street	Director (3 episodes)
2004	Living the Dream	Director, TV series
2008	This Is Her	Director, short film
2009	Go Girls	Director (4 episodes)
2010	Redemption	Director & Writer, short film
2010	Kawa	Director
2010-12	Shortland Street	Producer (59 episodes)
2017	Waru	Co-Director & Co-Writer
2024	The Haka Party Incident	Director & Producer

== Theatre ==
=== Directing ===
Wolfe has directed a number of plays including:

- Luncheon (2014) by Aroha Awarau, at the Basement Theatre, Auckland. Starring Jennifer Ward-Lealand
- The Haka Party Incident (2017) written and directed by Katie Wolfe. Verbatim theatre, produced by Auckland Theatre Company.
- Anahera (2017) by Emma Kinane. Circa Theatre, Wellington.
- The Haka Party Incident (2020) (revision) written and directed by Katie Wolfe. Produced by Auckland Theatre Company.

=== Acting Roles ===
Year	Title	Role	Notes
1999	The God Boy	Molly	Downstage Theatre
2000	Haruru Mai	Paloma	NZ International Festival
2001	A Midsummer Night's Dream	Hermia	NZ Actors Company
2002	Queen Leah	Edgmar	NZ Actors Company

== Awards and nominations ==
Year	Association	Category	Work	Result
1995	New Zealand Film and TV Awards	Best Female Performance in Supporting Role - Film	The Last Tattoo	Nominated
1995	New Zealand Film and Television Awards	Best Female Performance in a Supporting Role - Television	Marlin Bay	Nominated
1997	TV Guide Television Awards	Best Actress	Cover Story, episode 7	Won
2008	New Zealand Film and TV Awards	Film Award for Best Short Film	This Is Her	Nominated
2008	Antipodes Film Festival, St Tropez	Nicolas Baudin Award for Best Short Film	This Is Her	Won
2008	Prague International Short Film Festival	Best Audience Film Award	This Is Her	Won
2009	Filmets - Badalona Short Film Festival	Venus de Badalona for Best Short Film	This Is Her	Won
2009	Aspen Shortsfest	Jury Award for Best Comedy	This Is Her	Won
2009	Hamptons International Film Festival	Audience Award for Best Short	This Is Her	Won
2009	Palm Springs Shortfest	Future Filmmaker Award		Won
2010	Show Me Shorts Film Festival	Best Film	This Is Her	Won
2010	ImagineNative Film + Media Arts Festival	Jury Award for Best Short Drama	Redemption	Won
2010	ImagineNative Film + Media Arts Festival	Cynthia Lickers-Sage Award for Emerging Talent	Redemption	Won
2011	Sundance Film Festival	Short Filmmaking Award in International	Redemption	Nominated
2021	Adam NZ Play Award	Best Play by A Māori Playwright	The Haka Party Incident	Won

== Personal life ==
Wolfe married fellow actor Tim Balme in 1994, and together they have two children. Wolfe also has a step-son.
