= Jodie Rimmer =

New Zealand actress

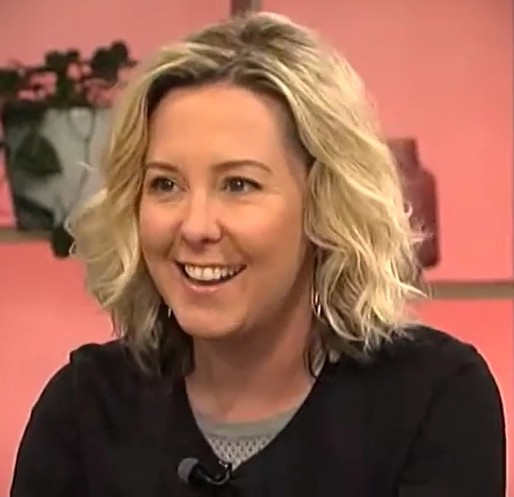
- Rimmer in 2016
- Born: 1974 (age 51–52); Auckland, New Zealand
- Other name: Jo Rimmer
- Years active: 1990–present
- Awards: New Zealand Screen Awards: Best Actress in a Supporting Role; 2004 In My Father's Den

Jodie Rimmer (born 1974) is a New Zealand actor best known for starring on Young Hercules, as Lilith. Her work includes Xena: Warrior Princess,The Strip, and In My Father's Den. Jodie guest starred in season 1 & 2 of Sweet Tooth for Netflix.

== Biography ==
Rimmer was educated at Carmel College & Glenfield College on Auckland's North Shore.

=== Awards ===
In 2005, Rimmer won in the Performance by an Actress in a Supporting Role category at the New Zealand Screen Awards for her role in the film In My Father's Den (2004).

== Filmography ==
=== Film ===
Year	Title	Role	Notes
1999	I'll Make You Happy	Siggy	
2000	Channelling Baby	Baby (voice)	
2001	Snakeskin	Daisy	
2004	In My Father's Den	Jackie	
2008	Playing for Charlie	Paula Hobbs	
2008	Apron Strings	Virginia	
2009	Five New Things	Alice	Short
2009	Separation City	Joanne	
2014	Everything We Loved	Jane	
2015	Turbo Kid	Mother (voice)	
2015	Deathgasm	Aunt Mary	
2015	Escargore	Shelly (voice)	Short
2016	Stick to Your Gun	Dorian	Short
2022	Nude Tuesday	Diane	

=== Television ===
Year	Title	Role	Notes
1990	The New Adventures of Black Beauty	Phoebe Trent	"Different Races"
1990	The Rogue Stallion	Ginny Garrett	TV film
1993-95	Melody Rules	Zoe Robbins	"Going, Going... Goner", "Gullible's Travels", "Double Scotch"
1994	Shortland Street	Stacey	TV series
1995	Riding High	Tiffany	Recurring role
1997	Shortland Street	Danni	TV series
1998	Xena: Warrior Princess	Seraphin	"Sacrifice: Parts 1 & 2"
1998-99	Young Hercules	Lilith	Recurring role
1999	Hercules: The Legendary Journeys	Seska	"The Academy", "A Wicked Good Time"
2001	Shortland Street	Samara Hindmarsh / Lily Jansen	Recurring role
2002-03	The Strip	Kathryn Moore	Main role
2003	You Wish!	Zoe	TV film
2004	Not Only But Always	Wendy Snowden	TV film
2009	Until Proven Innocent	Donna Chisholm	TV film
2012	Auckland Daze	Jodie	"1.3"
2014	Agent Anna	Liz	Recurring role
2015	The Brokenwood Mysteries	Gloria Ginsberg	"Leather and Lace", "To Die or Not to Die", "Blood Pink"
2015	Funny Girls	Various	"1.3"
2016	Terry Teo	Line Producer	"Baby Takes a Bullet"
2016	Filthy Rich	Lorna	TV series
2017–18	Power Rangers Ninja Steel	Jackie Thompson	2 Episodes
2021	Sweet Tooth	Judy	"When Pubba Met Birdie", "Big Man"
