= Nights in the Gardens of Spain (disambiguation) =

Nights in the Gardens of Spain, G. 49 (originally Noches en los jardines de España) is a musical composition by Manuel de Falla.

Nights in the Gardens of Spain may also refer to:

- Nights in the Gardens of Spain (novel), semi-autobiographical novel by Witi Ihimaera
- Nights in the Gardens of Spain (film), also known as Kawa, a 2010 New Zealand film
- "Nights in the Gardens of Spain", a monologue in the BBC television series Talking Heads
