= Loren Horsley =

New Zealand-born actress and writer

- Born: October 27, 1977 (age 48); New Zealand
- Occupations: Actress; writer; director
- Children: 1

Loren Taylor (née Horsley) (born 27 October 1977) is a New Zealand-born actress and writer.

== Career ==
Horsley played Lily in the film Eagle vs Shark (2007), which she co-wrote with her then-partner, Taika Waititi.

Horsley's directorial debut film The Moon Is Upside Down (2023) won the Best Film award at the First Feature Competition of the 2023 Tallinn Black Nights Film Festival.

== Charity work ==
Horsley does voiceovers, casting, and acting in the promotional videos for the One Percent Collective, which supports small New Zealand charities.

== Awards and nominations ==
- 2003 New Zealand Film and TV Awards - nominated for Best Screenplay with Grant Lahood, Jason Whyte, Gentiane Lupi, and Genevieve McClean for Kombi Nation
- 2007 Newport International Film Festival (United States) - Jury award for Best Actress - Eagle vs Shark
- 2023 Tallinn Black Nights Film Festival (Estonia) - Best Film Award at the First Feature Competition shared with producers Philippa Campbell and Georgina Conder for The Moon Is Upside Down

== Plays and films ==
- The Moon Is Upside Down (2023) – Director, Writer, Actor
- Existence (2012)
- Dancing in the Sky (2011)
- Diagnosis: Death (2009)
- The Handover (2008)
- Eagle vs Shark (2007) – Lily
- Lovely Rita (2007)
- Bad Dates (2005)
- Heinous Crime (2004) – Lawyer, Jury member, Debbie
- The Insiders Guide to Happiness (2004) (TV) – Olive
- Kombi Nation (2003) – Liz
- The Strip (2002-2003)
- Atlantis High (2001) (TV) – Sabrina Georgia
- Xena: Warrior Princess (2000) (TV) – Sieglinda
- Young Hercules (1998) (TV) – Cleo

== Personal life ==
Horsley adopted a two-year-old Thai child in 2021.
