= For Good (2003 film) =

- Directed by: Stuart McKenzie
- Written by: Stuart McKenzie
- Produced by: Neil Pardington
- Starring: Michelle Langstone; Tim Balme; Miranda Harcourt; Tim Gordon
- Cinematography: Duncan Cole
- Edited by: Paul Sutorius; Richard Hobbs
- Music by: Shayne Carter
- Release date: 20 July 2003
- Running time: 92 min
- Country: New Zealand
- Language: English

For Good is a 2003 New Zealand film written and directed by Stuart McKenzie. It premiered at the 2003 Wellington Film Festival and played at the Montreal Film Festival later that year.

The film's production company Kahukura Productions got into financial trouble and the film was nearly "lost", before finally getting a cinema release in 2004.

A woman posing as a journalist interviews the abductor and killer of her childhood friend as he comes up for parole.

A man accused of abducting and murdered a young girl appeared as an extra in a bar scene in the film.

== Cast ==
- Michelle Langstone as Lisa Pearce
- Tim Balme as Grant Wilson
- Miranda Harcourt as Fleur Hill
- Tim Gordon as Donald Hill
- Adam Gardiner as Tom Grainger
- Hera Dunleavy as Nel
- Megan Edwards as Philippa Pearce
- Anneke-Lee Gough as Tracey Hill

== Reception ==
The New Zealand Herald's Russell Baillie gives it 2 stars says "While much of For Good delivers in the menacing atmosphere department, helped by an ominous soundtrack by Shayne Carter, it soon becomes infuriating with uneven performances and the amount of suspension of disbelief required of its plotting." Ronnie Scheib from Variety writes "This is apparently the stuff of rural legend in New Zealand, a recurring nightmare fueled by several real cases. Pic occasionally dips into odd pockets of emotional complexity, but ambition far outweighs execution. Cable sales are an outside possibility."

== Awards ==
2003 New Zealand Film Awards

- Best Actress: Michelle Langstone – nominated
- Best Supporting Actress: Miranda Harcourt – nominated
- Best Juvenile Performer: Anneke-Lee Gough – nominated
