= Hugh Macdonald (filmmaker) =

New Zealand film director

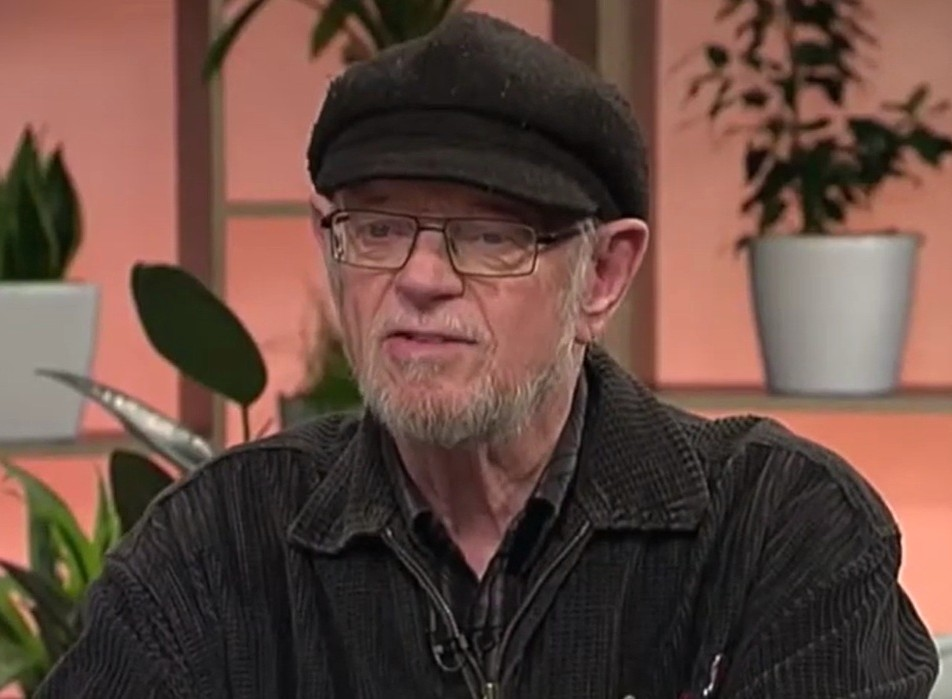
Macdonald in 2017

Hugh Rex Macdonald (1 December 1943 – 28 May 2024) was a New Zealand film director. He worked on films for the National Film Unit including travel films, and historical drama The Governor. He was nominated for an Academy Award for Animated Short Film as producer.

== Work ==
Macdonald directed the short film This is New Zealand, which was shown across three screens in the New Zealand pavilion at Expo '70 in Osaka.

In 1986, Macdonald was nominated for an Academy Award for Animated Short Film as producer of The Frog, the Dog and the Devil, made with the New Zealand National Film Unit and Martin Townsend.

In August 2017, Macdonald presented at the New Zealand International Film Festival the biographical documentary "No Ordinary Sheila", which describes the 9-decades-long life of the Wellington-based natural historian, illustrator and writer Sheila Natusch. The movie was filmed over three years (2014-2017), mostly shot in Wellington and Stewart Island.

Macdonald died in the Porirua suburb of Whitby on 28 May 2024, at the age of 80.
