= Walter Coblenz =

American film producer and production manager

- Born: August 15, 1928
- Died: March 16, 2022 (aged 93); Los Angeles, California, U.S.
- Occupations: Film producer, production manager

Walter Coblenz (August 15, 1928 – March 16, 2022) was an American film producer and production manager. He was nominated for an Academy Award in the category Best Picture for the film All the President's Men.

Coblenz died on March 16, 2022, in Los Angeles, California, at the age of 93.

== Selected filmography ==
- The Candidate (1972)
- All the President's Men (1976)
- The Onion Field (1979)
- The Legend of the Lone Ranger (1981)
- Strange Invaders (1983)
- SpaceCamp (1986)
- Sister, Sister (1987)
- For Keeps (1988)
- 18 Again! (1988)
- The Babe (1992)
- Money Talks (1997)
- Her Majesty (2001)
