= Suzanne Lee (actress) =

New Zealand actress

- Born: New Zealand
- Occupations: Singer, Actress

Suzanne Lee is a New Zealand actress and singer. She was nominated for 1982 Feltex Television Award for best new talent, was named New Zealand’s most professional entertainer by the Variety Artists' Club and was the Entertainment Operators' Association 1982 Rising star award winner.

Lee featured in 1980-81 musical TV series 12 Bar Rhythm 'n' Shoes and after that finished she went on to front a 1982 show Ladies and Gentlemen, Suzanne Lee. It was a five show musical entertainment series that featured her performing with Roy Phillips, a live band and dancers. In 1986 she fronted an Entertainment Showcase on One.

She played the flatmate Phillipa in the TV series Heroes, Val in Mr. Wrong and was a cop for nearly four years on Shortland Street.

Lee has appeared on stage in shows such as Chicago (touring, 2001) as Velma, Oliver! (Mercury, 1981) as Nancy, Kiwis at Kinsela (Belvoir Street, 1985) and was Debbie Byrne's understudy for Sunset Boulevard (Regent Theatre, 1996), filling in at times as Norma Desmond.
