= Strike (percussion group) =

New Zealand percussion group

Strike is a New Zealand percussion group which formed in 1993. The group has worked with New Zealand composers and is known for its energetic and choreographed performances.

The group has performed music by several New Zealand composers: Gareth Farr, David Downes, Miriama Young, Ross Harris, and John Psathas. In 2014 they performed Psathas's Between Zero and One at the Dunedin, Christchurch and New Zealand arts festivals. Their performances are theatrical and incorporate movement and dance. They have worked with choreographers Shona McCullagh and Wendy Wallace, producer Philippa Campbell and sound producer Ollivier Ballester.

Strike have contributed to music education, offering workshops and visiting and performing in schools. They have performed in Asia, London, Europe and Mexico.

In 2001 they won best classical music CD for New Zealand Percussion Music at the New Zealand Music Awards. Music for the short film Aeon (2004) was composed by Murray Hickman and performed by Strike.

Members of the group have included Murray Hickman, Jeremy Fitzsimons, Tim Whitta, Leni Sulusi, Takumi Motokawa, Alison Low Choy, Thomas Friggens, Steve Bremner, Kristie Ibrahim, Tom Pierard, Eryn Gleeson, and James Fuller.

== Discography ==
- New Zealand Percussion Music (2000)
- Sketches (2009)
