= Aroha Awarau =

New Zealand journalist and playwright (1976–2026)

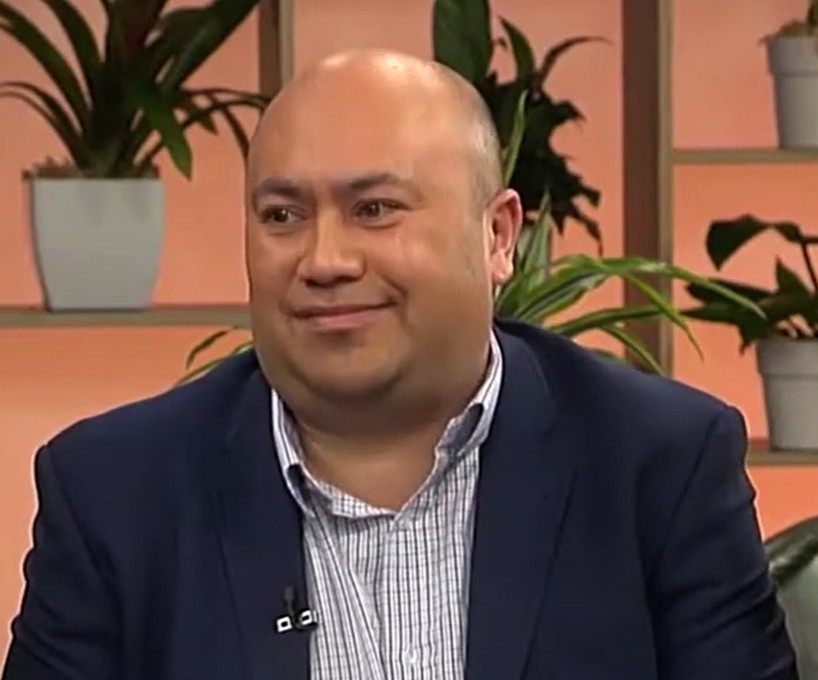
- Awarau in 2017
- Born: Aroha Edward Awarau; 21 January 1976; Hāwera, New Zealand
- Died: 14 January 2026 (aged 49); Ponsonby, New Zealand
- Education: University of Waikato; Auckland University of Technology
- Occupations: Journalist; playwright
- Years active: 1990s–2026
- Employer(s): Woman's Day (New Zealand); New Zealand Woman's Weekly
- Television: Native Affairs (Whakaata Māori)
- Awards: New Zealand Magazine Journalist of the Year (2008); New Zealand Celebrity and Entertainment Magazine Journalist of the Year (2013); Scroll of Honour of the Variety Artists Club of New Zealand (2019); Ronald Hugh Morrieson Literary Award (thrice)

Aroha Edward Awarau (21 January 1976 – 14 January 2026) was a New Zealand journalist and playwright. He won the 2008 New Zealand Magazine Journalist of the Year (Mass Market) at the annual Magazine Publisher's Association Awards. He was a finalist again for the same award in 2011, 2012, 2014 and 2016. In 2013, he was awarded the New Zealand Celebrity and Entertainment Magazine Journalist of the Year at the Magazine Publisher's Awards.

Awarau was a news editor for the Woman's Day magazine, and a senior writer at New Zealand Woman's Weekly. He was a story producer for the Māori Television current affairs show Native Affairs.

He was also a successful playwright, with his first play Luncheon, starring accomplished New Zealand actress Jennifer Ward-Lealand and directed by Katie Wolfe, winning Best Play at the 2014 New Zealand Script Writing Awards. His second play Officer 27 was a finalist at the New Zealand Adams Playwriting Awards and the New Zealand Script Writing Awards in 2016. His short film Home premiered at the imagineNATIVE Film + Media Arts Festival in Toronto.

== Life and career ==
Awarau was born on 21 January 1976 in Hāwera, where he also grew up. His ancestry included Ngāti Maru, Ngāti Porou, Niuean, and Samoan, with specific pride of his Pacific heritage. He had a degree in film and television from the University of Waikato (1998), and a journalism degree from the Auckland University of Technology (2004). After leaving Waikato University, Awarau worked in the New Zealand film industry for two years, working on films such as What Becomes of the Broken Hearted? and The Price of Milk.

He also had a short stint as a stand-up comedian, becoming a finalist in the Raw Quest, a national competition to find the best new comedian and appeared as a contestant in the reality show So You Think You're Funny?, a competition to find New Zealand's funniest new comedian.

While still at high school, Awarau was the first writer to become a three-time winner of the Ronald Hugh Morrieson Literary Award. The annual award was created by the South Taranaki District Council to commemorate Hāwera's most famous author, Ronald Hugh Morrieson.

In October 2019, he was presented with a Scroll of Honour from the Variety Artists Club of New Zealand for his contribution to New Zealand entertainment.

Awarau died at a hospice in Ponsonby, on 14 January 2026, at the age of 49.
