= Alicia Fulford-Wierzbicki =

New Zealand actress

- Occupation: Actress

Alicia Fulford-Wierzbicki is a New Zealand actress. Her debut performance was in the critically acclaimed film Rain.

== Filmography ==
=== Film ===
Year	Title	Role	Type
2001	Rain	Janey	Feature film
2004	Fracture	Olivia Peet	Feature film

=== Television ===
Year	Title	Role	Type
1999	A Twist in the Tale	Katie Johnson	TV series, episode 2: "A Crack in Time"
2002	Revelations – The Initial Journey	Ruth	TV series, episode 24: "The Runaway"

== Awards and nominations ==
Year	Nominated work	Award	Category	Result
2001	Rain	Nokia New Zealand Film Awards	Best Juvenile Performer	Won
