= Jaime Passier-Armstrong =

New Zealand actress (born 1981)

- Born: Jaime Rachel Renee Passier-Armstrong; August 24, 1981 (age 45); Queenstown, New Zealand
- Occupation: Actress
- Years active: 2001–2016

Jaime Rachel Renee Passier-Armstrong (born August 24, 1981) is a New Zealand actress. She is known for her role of Jay Copeland in the New Zealand's soap opera Shortland Street.

== Early years ==
Passier-Armstrong was born in Queenstown, New Zealand. She began her professional career at the age of twelve on the TV series, "Plainclothes".

== Career ==
In 2000, Passier-Armstrong was selected for the female lead role of Ripeka Bastion in the drama film Crooked Earth. In 2004, she joined the cast in New Zealand's top rating television soap opera series Shortland Street. She received a nomination for Best Actress in the TV Guide's Peoples Choice Awards for her role as Jay Copeland in the show. She also appeared in the bilingual drama television series Korero Mai.

== Filmography ==
Film
Year	Title	Role	Notes
2000	Jubilee	Lucille Williams	Supporting role
2001	No One Can Hear You	Tracey Johnson	Supporting role
2001	Jumping Ship (TV movie)	Jonas	Supporting role
2001	Crooked Earth	Ripeka Bastion	Lead role
2001	Ihaka: Blunt Instrument (TV movie)	Ihaka's Niece	Minor role
2010	Days of Forgiveness (TV movie)	Receptionistin	

Television
Year	Title	Role	Notes
1995	Mysterious Island	Ovelanui 'Nui'	2 episodes
2003	Street Legal	Donna	2 episodes
2003	Power Rangers Ninja Storm	Skyla	2 episodes
2004-2007	Shortland Street	Jay Copeland	92 episodes
2009	Legend of the Seeker	Constance	1 episode
2009	The Cult	Kelly	1 episode
2011	Ice (TV mini-series)	Tanya	1 episode
2011	Underbelly NZ: Land of the Long Green Cloud	Isobel Wilson	2 episodes
2016	The Wonder	Director	TV film
