= In My Father's Den (film) =

2004 film by Brad McGann

- Theatrical release poster
- Directed by: Brad McGann
- Written by: Maurice Gee (novel); Brad McGann
- Produced by: Trevor Haysom; Dixie Linder
- Starring: Matthew Macfadyen; Emily Barclay; Miranda Otto
- Production companies: New Zealand Film Commission; UK Film Council; VisionView; Element X New Zealand on Air; T.H.E Film; Little Bird Productions
- Distributed by: Warner Bros. Pictures; Icon Film Distribution; Hoyts Distribution (Australia); Optimum Releasing (UK)
- Release date: 11 June 2004 (Sydney Film Festival)
- Running time: 128 minutes
- Country: New Zealand
- Language: English
- Budget: ~ NZ$7,000,000

In My Father's Den is a 2004 New Zealand film written and directed by Brad McGann and starring Matthew Macfadyen and Emily Barclay. It is based on the novel of the same title by Maurice Gee. The film was released in October 2004 to positive reviews.

== Plot ==
War photographer Paul Prior (Matthew Macfadyen) returns to his hometown in the South Island of New Zealand following the death of his father Jeff (Matthew Chamberlain). Paul reunites with his younger brother Andrew (Colin Moy), a pious local ostrich farmer who is married to the very religious and agoraphobic Penny (Miranda Otto). Under Andrew's pressure, Paul reluctantly prolongs his stay to help sort out the sale of their father's cottage and the adjoining orchard.

At the dilapidated family property, Paul revisits his father's makeshift den in the equipment shed. Jeff had secretly harbored a love of wine, literature and free-thinking philosophy, and he found solace in the den away from his puritanical wife Iris (Vanessa Riddell). As a child, Paul had accidentally stumbled upon this wondrous booklined universe, and Jeff shared the den with him on the condition that he did not tell anyone else. Paul accepts a temporary English teaching position at his old high school. He also forges an unlikely friendship with the 16-year-old Celia (Emily Barclay), a misfit who loves writing and dreams of travelling to Spain. Celia is the daughter of Paul's former girlfriend Jackie (Jodie Rimmer), the town's butcher. It is implied that Paul believes Celia to be his daughter and becomes a father figure for the teenager.

Resenting the unwanted attentions of her mother's boyfriend Gareth (Antony Starr), Celia seeks solace in Paul's den. Their budding friendship eventually comes under scrutiny from the judgmental Andrew and the envious Jackie. After Paul attacks Gareth for beating Celia, Jackie forbids Paul from having contact with her daughter. Despite the warnings, Celia continues to visit and Paul encourages her in her ambitions as a writer. In the middle of winter, Celia goes missing. Due to their close friendship, Paul becomes the prime suspect in her disappearance and endures the hostility of the town including Gareth and his teenage nephew Jonathan (Jimmy Keen), who fancied Celia.

The rest of the film is shown in flashbacks of Paul's teenage years interspersed with his interactions with Celia and final confrontation with Andrew. After Jonathan reveals that his father had confiscated his camera for illicitly photographing Celia, Paul confronts Andrew. Jeff is then revealed to be Celia's biological father through an affair with Jackie, which Paul and Iris had discovered. Grief-stricken and betrayed, Iris committed suicide, while Paul — ignoring the pleas of Andrew — left the family home at age 17. Paul also learns that Andrew had invited Celia to view their late father's will; Jeff had left a third of his estate to Celia.

Penny, having mistaken Celia for Andrew's mistress after accidentally viewing Jonathan's photos, and with a misunderstanding of confirmation from Andrew, had become enraged and pushed Celia off a balcony, killing her. To protect his wife, Andrew covered up Celia's death. After Paul and Andrew's confrontation, Jonathan calls the police, believing his father killed Celia. To continue protecting Penny, Andrew takes the blame and is arrested. Celia's body is later found in a river.

Following the funeral, Paul burns the den and reconciles with Jackie. The film closes with a flashback to the last time Paul saw Celia. They openly discuss being siblings — Paul being revealed to have known she was his half-sister all along — and they say goodbye as she walks down the road to her untimely death.

== Cast ==
- Matthew Macfadyen as Paul Prior
- Emily Barclay as Celia
- Colin Moy as Andrew
- Miranda Otto as Penny
- Jodie Rimmer as Jackie
- Vanessa Riddell as Iris
- Matthew Chamberlain as Jeff
- Antony Starr as Gareth
- Jimmy Keen as Jonathan
- Geoff Dolan as O'Neill
- Asher Emanuel as Young Paul
- Vicky Haughton as Mrs Seagar

== Production ==
Filming locations were mainly in Central Otago, New Zealand, with the town of Roxburgh standing in for the fictional Rapata Junction. Interior scenes of Andrew and Penny's house were filmed in Auckland.

In My Father's Den was the only feature film and the final work written or directed by McGann, who died of bowel cancer in 2007.

== Awards ==
The film won the Fipresci Prize at the 2004 Toronto International Film Festival, the Mercedes Benz Youth Jury Prize at the 52nd San Sebastián International Film Festival in Spain in the same year, the Special Jury Prize at the Seattle International Film Festival in 2005 and the Grand Prix at the 2005 Festival du Film Britannique de Dinard. It became one of the top 10 grossing New Zealand films.

== Critical reaction ==
The website Rotten Tomatoes, which compiles mostly North American reviews, gives the film a 100 per cent "fresh" rating, meaning consistently positive reviews, and with an average rating of 7.2 out of 10. The latter figure is the average from seven reviews. The film also garnered acclaim in many publications. A reviewer for The Australian described the film as "one of the best films I have ever seen". Meanwhile, Empire determined that "director Brad McGann reveals great skill and bravery in the way he brings the story's insular world to life".
