= Margaret Umbers =

New Zealand actress

- Born: New Zealand
- Other name: Makareta Umbers
- Occupations: Actress, Singer

Margaret Umbers is a New Zealand actress and singer. She starred as Sandy in Death Warmed Up, Tanya in Bridge to Nowhere, bass player Maxine Harris in the TV series Heroes and as Hinemoa in the 2019 short Midriff. She featured in Smash Palace as Rose and Mr. Wrong as Samantha, and played Katherine Blake on Shortland Street.

Umbers released her debut album, titled Love on a Swing, with Daniel Hewson and Blue Pearl in 2013. It is a jazz album and features backing music from Matt Watson, Warwick Simpson, Billy Kristian, Matt Hennessy, Jason Orme, Paul Godden and Calum Dundas. She was previously a member of Side Effect with Shane Dawson.
