= The Park Terrace Murder =

- Written by: Isa Moynihan
- Directed by: Brian McDuffie
- Starring: George Henare; Jacqui Dunn; Jennifer Ludlam; Ernie Stanley
- Country of origin: New Zealand
- Original language: English

Production
- Running time: 72 min

Original release
- Network: TV2
- Release: 28 November 1976

The Park Terrace Murder is a 1976 New Zealand television film written by Isa Moynihan, a lecturer in English, drama and linguistics. It is a dramatisation of a historic murder and subsequent trial from Christchurch in 1871. The later half which focussed on the trail was taken directly from court transcripts.

== Cast ==
- George Henare as Cedeno
- Jacqui Dunn as Margaret Burke
- Jennifer Ludlam as Catherine Glynn
- Ernie Stanley as William Robinson
- Myra De Groot as Mrs. Robinson
- Vivienne Riddle as Caroline Robinson
- Nevan Rowe as Sofa Robinson
- Ray Edkins as Patrick Campbell
- Ken Blackburn as Thomas Joynt
- Waric Slyfield as Mr. Duncan
- William Johnson as Judge Gresson
- Bevan Wilson as George Fownes
- Roger Oakley as Sgt McKnight
- Robert Bell as Constable Pratt
- David Weatherley as Inspector Pender
- Gabriel Prendergast as Mr. Boog
- John Atha as John Cracroft Wilson
- Pam Seabold as Mrs. Cracroft Wilson
- Alan Johnston as Treadwell
- Scott Taylor as Prentice
- Donna Akersten as Mary
- Lee Grant as Mrs. Cotter
- Terence Cooper as Mr. Cotter
- Mary De Koster as Mrs. Boog
- Roy Billing as Father Chevier
- Norman Forsey as Price

== Reception ==
A. K. Grant in The Press wrote "As an example therefore of television acting and directing, the programme was a success. It could have done with a bit of tightening up." Grant then critisises the writer's approach to the case itself noting "The principal flaw in the production seemed to me to be a basic misconception on the part of the author, Isa Moynihan, of the choices open to Cedeno and his counsel at the trial."
