= 12 Bar Rhythm 'n' Shoes =

- Written by: Alan Trussell-Cullen
- Directed by: Chris Cooper; Ricky Stratful
- Country of origin: New Zealand
- Original language: English
- No. of seasons: 3
- No. of episodes: 20

Production
- Producer: Graeme Hodgson
- Running time: 60 minutes
- Production company: TV1

Original release
- Release: June 28, 1980 – August 8, 1981

12 Bar Rhythm 'n' Shoes was a musical entertainment TV series from New Zealand. Airing in 1980-81 it featured 12 young New Zealand performers singing and dancing with each episode featuring a special guest.

The following year some cast members went on to front their own shows. Haughton, Kiddell and Harper starred in VJM (acronym of Vicky, Jane and Maggie), a five show musical entertainment series also featuring regular guests. Lee had Ladies and Gentlemen, Suzanne Lee for five episodes, featuring a live band and male dancers. Eriwata fronted his own five episode musical show titled Richard Eriwata - Te Wairua.

== Cast ==
- Richard Eriwata
- Kerry Gallagher
- Maggie Harper
- Vicky Haughton
- Jayne Kiddell
- Suzanne Lee
- Steve Martin
- Dave Noda
- Reg Ruka
- Tim Smyser
- Marc Stevens
- Darien Takle (seasons 1-2)
- Donna Fitzgerald (season 3)

== Guests ==
- Society Jazzmen
- Neville Grenfell
- Kevin Fury and Jim Joll
- Carl Doy
- Graeme Stentiford
- Dick Hopp
- Peter Morgan
- Kim Regan
- Bruce McKinnon
- Louise and Peter Bonner
- Neil McGough
- Continental Airlines Auckland Brass Band
- The Andy Brown Quartet
- Red McKelvie
- Gloria Gibson
- Paul Gibens
- The Lodge
- Savoy Trio
- Val Leemon
- Bob Jackson

== Reception ==
Douglas McKenzie in the Press critisised the Wild West theme and the climactic brawl of the final episode and wrote "Not to put too fine a point on it, this final sequence in "12 Bar Rhythm 'n' Shoes" was dirty, scrambling, brutish and unpleasant."

== Awards ==
New Zealand Feltex Awards 1981

- Best Entertainment programme - nominated

New Zealand Feltex Awards 1982

- Best Entertainment programme - nominated
