= Marlin Bay =

- Created by: Greg McGee
- Starring: Ilona Rodgers; Andy Anderson; Lani John Tupu; May Lloyd; Katie Wolfe; Rupert Green; Robert Coleby; Kevin J. Wilson; Ian Mune; Jeffrey Thomas; Catherine Wilkin; Pete Smith; Mark Ferguson; Susan Brady; Lucy Lawless; Don Selwyn; Vicky Haughton; Erik Thomson; Jim McLarty; Ray Woolf; Jerome Ehlers; Kevin Smith
- Composer: Stephen McCurdy
- Country of origin: New Zealand
- Original language: English
- No. of seasons: 3
- No. of episodes: 39

Production
- Executive producers: Chris Bailey; Chris Hampson; John Barnett; Tim Saunders
- Producers: Janice Finn; Christina Milligan
- Cinematography: Gary Moore; Michael O'Connor
- Editor: Ken Zemke
- Production company: South Pacific Pictures

Original release
- Network: TV One
- Release: 20 August 1992 – 1994

Marlin Bay is a New Zealand one-hour drama television series which ran for 39 episodes from 1992 to 1994. The series was set in a fictional resort and casino in the picturesque far north of New Zealand. The series dealt with issues regarding the high-flying lifestyle surrounding the hotel and casino, and the contrasting lives of the area's local residents. The cast included Ilona Rodgers, Andy Anderson, Katie Wolfe, and featured Kevin Smith and Lucy Lawless. It was produced by South Pacific Pictures.

== Cast ==
- Ilona Rodgers as Charlotte Kincaid
- Andy Anderson
- Lani John Tupu as David Spence
- May Lloyd
- Katie Wolfe as Ginny Gannaway
- Rupert Green
- Robert Coleby
- Kevin J. Wilson
- Ian Mune
- Jeffrey Thomas
- Catherine Wilkin
- Pete Smith as Matiu Burrows
- Mark Ferguson as Gene Toomey
- Susan Brady as Rebecca Saunders
- Lucy Lawless
- Don Selwyn
- Vicky Haughton
- Erik Thomson
- Jim McLarty
- Ray Woolf
- Jerome Ehlers as Christian Beckett
- Kevin Smith
