= George Henare =

New Zealand actor

George Henare CNZM OBE
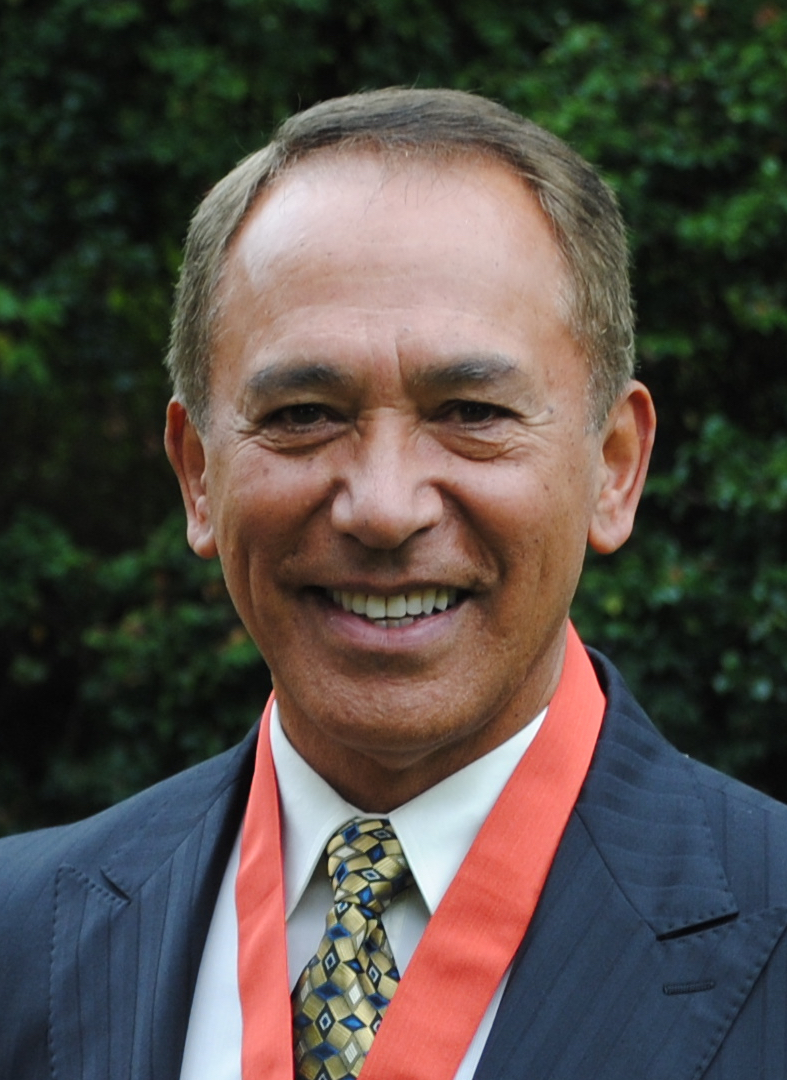
- Henare in 2010
- Born: George Winiata Henare; 11 September 1945 (age 81); Gisborne, New Zealand
- Occupation: Actor
- Years active: 1965 – present
- Honours: Officer of the Order of the British Empire; Companion of the New Zealand Order of Merit

George Winiata Henare CNZM OBE (born 11 September 1945) is a New Zealand actor with a career spanning over 50 years.

== Early life ==
Born in Gisborne on 11 September 1945, the third youngest in a family of ten children, Henare affiliates to the Māori tribes (iwi) of Ngāti Porou and Ngāti Hine. He lived on a farm until the age of 12 on the East Coast of New Zealand's North Island.

== Career ==
Henare has a distinguished career as an actor in New Zealand with 50 years on stage and screen. Henare began his acting career after a stint as a postman and a trainee teacher. He has played lead roles in film, television, opera and theatre as well as radio and voice work. An early success was landing a role in a New Zealand Opera production of Porgy and Bess in 1965. He later toured Australia in Jesus Christ Superstar and Phantom of the Opera.

=== Film ===
Henare played the role of social worker Bennett in the classic New Zealand movie Once Were Warriors. Other films include Crooked Earth, Rapa Nui produced by Kevin Costner, The Silent One, The Legend of Johnny Lingo and Kawa (aka Nights in the Gardens of Spain), and The Rule of Jenny Pen. Henare also played a lead role in the NZ short film Mananui (1995) alongside actor Cliff Curtis.

=== Television ===
Henare has performed in numerous television dramas in New Zealand including The Park Terrace Murder (1976), the historical series Greenstone and Mercy Peak. He also acted in the award-winning docu-drama Nga Tohu: Signatures which explored political and social issues around the Treaty of Waitangi. Other television roles included appearances in Xena: Warrior Princess, Hercules: The Legendary Journeys and Street Legal.

Since March 2011, he has had a recurring guest role as Henare Ngatai, father of Roimata in the long-running soap opera Shortland Street.

=== Stage ===
On stage, Henare has played a variety of roles from classical Shakespeare, musicals, operas to contemporary New Zealand theatre. In 2006, he won the actor of the year awardat the Chapman Tripp Theatre Awards for his performance in the role of Willy Loman in Death of a Salesman at Circa Theatre, Wellington.

In 2014 Henare became patron of the Newmarket Stage Company, a professional company based in Newmarket, Auckland. To help launch the company Henare played the lead in their first two productions of Educating Rita by Willy Russell and the New Zealand premiere of Tuesdays With Morrie by Mitch Albom and Jeffrey Hatcher.

== Honours and awards ==
In the 1988 New Year Honours, Henare was appointed an Officer of the Order of the British Empire, for services to the performing arts. In 2008, he received a Laureate Award from the Arts Foundation of New Zealand and was also honoured with the Te Waka Toi Award, Creative New Zealand for outstanding contribution to Māori theatre. He became a Companion of the New Zealand Order of Merit for services to the theatre in the 2010 New Year Honours.

== Filmography ==
=== Film ===
- 1984: The Silent One – Paui Te Po
- 1994: Once Were Warriors – Bennet
- 1994: Rapa Nui – Tupa
- 1995: Mananui (Short) – Kapa
- 2001: Crooked Earth – Tipene
- 2003: The Legend of Johnny Lingo – Johnny Lingo
- 2010: Kawa (aka Nights in the Gardens of Spain) – Hamiora
- 2014: The Dead Lands – Tane
- 2024: The Rule of Jenny Pen – Tony Garfield
- 2026: Sgt. Haane - Charles Bennett (elder)

=== Television ===
George Henare television credits
Year	Title	Role	Notes	Ref.
1976	The Park Terrace Murder	Cedcno	TV movie	
1990	The Ray Bradbury Theater	Forrester	1 episode	
1997	Xena: Warrior Princess	Hidsim	1 episode	
1999	Hercules: The Legendary Journeys	Zarathustra	2 episodes	
1999	Greenstone	Te Manahau	2 episodes	
2000	Beastmaster	Nutoa	1 episode	
2001–2003	Mercy Peak	Manu Bishop	8 episodes	
2002	Atomic Twister	Manuel Fluentez	TV movie	
2002	Street Legal	District Commander	2 episodes	
2002	The Vector File	Det. Ramos	TV movie	
2011	Shortland Street	Henare Ngatai	Recurring guest role	
2021	Fisk	Graham	5 episodes	
