= Heroes (New Zealand TV series) =

New Zealand television series (1984–1986)

- Written by: Grant Morris
- Directed by: Mike Smith
- Starring: Michael Hurst; Jay Laga'aia; Margaret Umbers; John Gibson
- Composer: John Gibson
- Country of origin: New Zealand
- Original language: English
- No. of seasons: 2
- No. of episodes: 14

Production
- Producer: Mike Smith
- Editor: Chris Gurr
- Running time: 25 minutes
- Production company: Gibson Group

Original release
- Release: October 21, 1984 – August 17, 1986

Heroes is a 1984 New Zealand television about a group of musicians trying to make it as a band. It was produced and directed by Mike Smith and written by Grant Morris. It ran for two series totalling 14 episodes. The band, called Heroes, was Michael Hurst as Dave Nelson (drums), Jay Laga'aia as Ron Ualesi (guitar), Margaret Umbers as Maxine Harris (bass) and John Gibson as Peter Knight (vocals, keys). Also featured in season 1 was Suzanne Lee as their housemate Philippa. In Australia's Sydney Morning Herald Bronwyn Watson called it a carbon copy of Sweet and Sour. The second series appeared in 1986.

== Cast ==
- Michael Hurst as Dave Nelson
- Jay Laga'aia as Ron Ualesi
- Margaret Umbers as Maxine Harris
- John Gibson as Peter Knight
- Frank Whitten as Leslie
- Vicky Haughton as Julie
- Suzanne Lee as Philippa
