= Radio Times (TV series) =

- Written by: Derek Payne
- Directed by: Graeme Hodgson; Derek Wooster; Ricky Stratful; Andrew Shaw
- Country of origin: New Zealand
- Original language: English
- No. of seasons: 4
- No. of episodes: 27

Production
- Producers: Tom Parkinson; Derek Wooster
- Running time: 60 minutes
- Production company: TV1

Original release
- Release: March 22, 1980 – October 16, 1982

Radio Times is a New Zealand television series. Beginning in 1980, it ran for four seasons over three years finishing in 1982.

In the 1930s the cast of the Radio Times radio show, with the Radio Times Orchestra, create their show before a live studio audience. Hosted by Dexter Fitzgibbons, singers perform songs from the era, the Radio Theatre act out plays and dancers keep the audience entertained.

== Cast ==
- Billy T James as Dexter Fitzgibbons
- Craig Scott as Guy Bosanquet (seasons 1-2)
- Brent Brodie as Jack Callaghan (seasons 3-4)
- Alita Gotti as Bunny Levaux (seasons 1-3)
- Vicky Haughton as Dixie Del Ray (season 4)
- Laurie Dee as Tommy Blackhouse / Chuck Rutter
- The Yandall Sisters as The Hi Spots
- Kirsten Michael as Trumpettes (seasons 1)
- Tammy Sylva as Trumpettes (seasons 1-3)
- Tracey Heath as Trumpettes (seasons 1-3)
- Lisa Witehira as Trumpettes (seasons 4)
- Ariana Estall as Trumpettes (seasons 4)
- Annabelles Dancers as The Insteps
- Alistair Douglas as The Radio Theatre / Harry Marsden
- Ian Watkin as The Radio Theatre (seasons 1-2)
- Derek Payne as The Radio Theatre (season 1)
- Waric Slyfield as The Radio Theatre (season 2)
- Terence Cooper as The Radio Theatre / Wilderforce Stubb (season 3)
- Doug Aston as The Radio Theatre (season 3)
- David Weatherly as The Radio Theatre (season 4)
- Elizabeth McRae as The Radio Theatre (season 4)
- Louise Malloy as Marjorie Manners

== Reception ==
Douglas McKenzie in the Press says during the third season ""Radio Times," on One, is an idea which might have succeeded beyond the wildest dreams of its originators (did it really originate in New Zealand?) but some changes in the front people in the new edition have not been obviously to the good."

== Awards ==
New Zealand Feltex Awards 1981

- Best Entertainment - won
