= Death Warmed Up =

- Film poster
- Directed by: David Blyth
- Written by: David Blyth; Michael Heath
- Produced by: Murray Newey
- Starring: Michael Hurst; Margaret Umbers; Gary Day; William Upjohn; Norelle Scott; David Letch
- Music by: Mark Nicholas
- Production company: Tucker Production Company; New Zealand Film Commission
- Release date: 1984
- Running time: 82 minutes
- Country: New Zealand
- Language: English

Death Warmed Up (released in the Philippines as Dr. Evil: Part II) is a 1984 New Zealand zombie film directed by David Blyth. It stars Michael Hurst, Margaret Umbers and Gary Day.

The film's plot centres around a young man named Michael Tucker (Hurst) seeking revenge against a mad scientist (Day), who years earlier caused him to kill his parents because he is creating zombies.

== Plot ==
As a child, Michael Tucker (Michael Hurst) is used as a test subject for mind control drugs developed by evil scientist Dr. Howell (Gary Day), which cause him to unwittingly kill his parents. After spending seven years in a mental institution for the murders, Michael, his girlfriend Sandy (Margaret Umbers) and his two friends Jeannie (Norelle Scott) and Lucas (William Upjohn) use Michael's car, a black 1963 Ford Fairlane 500, to set out on a trip to a remote island on which Dr. Howell's clinic is located. Desperate for revenge, Michael is determined to infiltrate the scientist's base and kill him with no mercy. After tracking him down, he kills Howell's mob of mind controlled slaves who are both zombies, but in the resulting mayhem both Jeannie and Lucas are both killed. At last Michael proceeds to brutally kill Howell after repeatedly stabbing him in the stomach with a knife. After escaping from the clinic, Michael and Sandy return to their holiday home, only to discover that it caught fire. When Michael steps out to investigate the damage, he is struck by a falling electrical line and is electrocuted to death, leaving Sandy alone weeping over the loss of him as she's overcome with grief and starting to run.

== Cast ==
- Michael Hurst as Michael Tucker
- Margaret Umbers as Sandy
- Gary Day as Dr. Howell
- William Upjohn as Lucas
- Norelle Scott as Jeannie
- David Letch as Spider
- Bruno Lawrence as Tex
- Geoff Snell as Jannings
- Ian Watkin as Bill
- David Weatherley as Professor Tucker (Michael's father)
- Tina Greenville as Netty Tucker (Michael's mother)
- Nathaniel Lees as Jackson
- Karam Hau as Berry
- Jonathan Hardy as Ranji Gandhi
- Norman Fairley as Barman

== Release and response ==
The film won the Grand Prix award at the 1984 Paris International Festival of Fantastic and Science-Fiction Film. Despite this, general reception to Death Warmed Up was mixed. Some of the covers of Death Warmed Up show a brain surgeon who is a skeleton who is about to use a hypodermic needle and a surgical knife to operate on the brain of a girl which doesn't represent any scene of the film.

Helen Martin in New Zealand film, 1912-1996 wrote "Targeted at a youth audience, Death Warmed Up celebrates B-movie splatter/horror. Technically the film is accomplished and uses the genre's conventions well, with atmospheric lighting, driving Dolby sound-track, off-centre camera angles, clever choreography of action and shooting style, particularly in the chase scenes, convincingly gruesome special effects, a lively score and unconventional editing. The inventive production design, with its surreal use of colour, corrugated iron, high-tech clinical interiors and sci-fi props and costumes creates an effectively futuristic world of mechanistic menace." She adds "Although the brain surgery is convincing enough to terrorise, the film lacks pace, a coherent plot and some character development to glue the episodes together."

William Dart from Rip It Up noted "Death Warmed Up tries for black humour that doesn't always come off. Droll touches such as a nurse being splattered with gore during an operation are infinitely less amusing on repetition, and Jonathan Hardy’s cameo as an Indian dairy-owner comes across as an unfunny and irrelevant piece of racism." The Press video reviewer said "Although there is plenty of action and suspense, this movie must border on the “nasty” because of its realism. It is definitely not one for the squeamish, but the acting and camera techniques must be admired." John Brooker in Hertfordshire Mercury's Video Scene says "The censors have snipped out some of the gore but there's still plenty left for those who like it. Gruesome."

In the Philippines, the film was released as Dr. Evil: Part II on 1 May 1987.

=== Banning in Australia ===
In 1985, the film was banned by the Australian Classification Board due to excessive violence. A censored version was later released.
