= Kombi Nation =

- Directed by: Grant Lahood
- Written by: Grant Lahood; Loren Horsley; Gentiane Lupi; Genevieve McClean; Jason Whyte
- Produced by: Ainsley Gardiner; Larry Parr
- Starring: Loren Horsley; Gentiane Lupi; Genevieve McClean; Jason Whyte
- Cinematography: Simon Riera
- Edited by: Grant Lahood; Annie Collins
- Music by: Plan 9
- Release date: 3 April 2002
- Running time: 86 min
- Country: New Zealand
- Language: English

Kombi Nation is a 2002 New Zealand film directed by Grant Lahood.

Kombi Nation was filmed in Europe over one month in 1999 on a tight budget. It premiered in April 2002 at World Cinema Showcase ahead of a planned cinema release in June. The film's production company Kahukura Productions got into financial trouble which stopped the release as the post production company Film Unit tried to recover money owed to them. It was released into cinemas in August 2003.

Three friends from New Zealand head of to tour Europe in a VW Kombi. They pick up another New Zealander and they are followed by a film crew.

== Cast ==
- Loren Horsley as Liz
- Gentiane Lupi as Sal
- Genevieve McClean as Maggie
- Jason Whyte as Scott

== Reception ==
The New Zealand Herald's Peter Calder gives it 4 stars says "What makes the small and clever Kombi Nation work so well is that it is a film with the courage of its restrictions. Grant Lahood keeps the focus tight and never gets ideas above the film's station. He has a sure sense of the chaos of that form of travel, which is sort of like mixed flatting in a space the size of a ping-pong table, and captures perfectly the cringe-inducing style of the Kiwi abroad who will ask a Spanish icecream vendor for hokey pokey." James Croot of the Press gave it 3 stars and writes "Kombi's central quartet all do their best with sometimes clunky dialogue, but it's Whyte who stands head and shoulders above his travelling companions."

Cinema Aotearoa said "So Kombi Nation wins points for painting what feels like a fairly true picture of the great Kiwi O.E. It’s a shame its a picture you probably won’t want to look at." On DVDTalk Matthew Ratzloff gave it 3 1/2 stars and says "Kombi Nation is a pretty light as far as drama goes. That's part of its charm, though; it's a fun, summertime adventure about people who make the type of mistakes that we all made at that age. There are plenty of movies in that category, of course, but few of them are as true-to-life as this one manages to be, owing in large part to the authenticity of the four main actors involved and the capable storytelling of Grant Lahood."

== Awards ==
2003 New Zealand Film Awards

- Best Film - nominated
- Best Director: Grant Lahood - nominated
- Best Actor: Jason Whyte - nominated
- Best Screenplay: Grant Lahood, Jason Whyte, Loren Horsley, Gentiane Lupi, Genevieve McClean - nominated
