= Not Only But Always =

- DVD cover
- Written by: Terry Johnson
- Directed by: Terry Johnson
- Starring: Rhys Ifans; Aidan McArdle; Jodie Rimmer; Camilla Power
- Country of origin: United Kingdom
- Original language: English

Production
- Producer: Alison Jackson
- Cinematography: David Odd
- Editor: Martin Sharpe
- Running time: 100 min
- Production company: Company Pictures

Original release
- Network: Channel 4
- Release: 30 December 2004

Not Only But Always is a British TV movie, originally screened on the Channel 4 network in the UK on 30 December 2004.

== Description ==
Written and directed by playwright Terry Johnson, the film tells the story of the working and personal relationship between the comedians Peter Cook and Dudley Moore, a hugely popular duo in the UK during the 1960s and 1970s.

Focusing primarily on Cook, the film traces the pair from their first meeting through their career as part of the Beyond the Fringe review, their television series Not Only... But Also (from which the film takes its title) and various other projects before their later estrangement as Moore became a successful Hollywood film star and Cook remained in the UK. Although some events are fictionalised and condensed, and the film was criticised in some quarters for an unsympathetic portrayal of many of Cook's faults, it was generally well-received critically.

== Cast ==
- Rhys Ifans as Peter Cook
- Aidan McArdle as Dudley Moore
- Jodie Rimmer as Wendy Snowden
- Camilla Power as Judy Huxtable
- Daphne Cheung as Lin Chong
- Jonathan Aris as Jonathan Miller
- Alan Cox as Alan Bennett
- Josephine Davison as Eleanor Bron

== Awards ==
- At the 2005 British Academy Television Awards, Not Only But Always was nominated for Best Single Drama, with Rhys Ifans winning the Best Actor for his portrayal of Peter Cook.

== See also ==
- Pete and Dud: Come Again
