= The Moon Is Upside Down =

New Zealand comedy drama film by Loren Taylor

- Directed by: Loren Taylor
- Screenplay by: Loren Taylor
- Produced by: Philippa Campbell; Georgina Conder
- Starring: Victoria Haralabidou; Elizabeth Hawthorne; Loren Taylor; Jemaine Clement; Rachel House; Robbie Magasiva; Robyn Malcolm
- Cinematography: Adam Luxton
- Edited by: Simon Price
- Music by: David Long
- Production company: Miss Conception Films
- Distributed by: Vendetta Films
- Release dates: 11 November 2023 (World premiere); 2 May 2024 (New Zealand)
- Running time: 100 minutes
- Country: New Zealand
- Language: English

The Moon Is Upside Down is a 2023 New Zealand comedy drama film that was written and directed by Loren Taylor. The film focuses on the stories of three women: Siberian mail-order bride Natalia, New Zealand anaesthetist Briar and housewife Faith, who are played by Victoria Haralabidou, Taylor and Elizabeth Hawthorne respectively.

== Synopsis ==
Three women - a duped mail-order bride, a numbed anaesthetist determined to have a romantic weekend, and an empty nester on an unexpected mission of mercy - each navigates her way through an unfamiliar landscape and the contours of the human heart.

== Production ==
=== Development ===
According to Loren Taylor, The Moon Is Upside Down was inspired by various elements including her sister's short stories, "murmurs" of a mail order bride in the Wairarapa and her own personal overseas travel experiences. While developing the script, Taylor said that she wanted to explore contemporary issues in New Zealand such as the housing crisis, industrial agriculture, and privilege. Taylor envisioned the film as a multi-narrative story of three women in the Wellington Region, describing it as an "interwoven existential cathartic dramedy." Taylor also drew inspiration from several films including Milcho Manchevski's Before the Rain, Maren Ade's Toni Erdmann and Alice Rohrwacher's Happy as Lazzaro.

== Cast ==
- Victoria Haralabidou as Natalia
- Elizabeth Hawthorne as Faith
- Loren Taylor as Briar.
- Jemaine Clement as MacIntosh
- Rachel House as Tuffy
- Robbie Magasiva as Tim
- Robyn Malcolm as Hilary
- Ginette McDonald and Karen O'Leary.

Due to the COVID-19 lockdowns in force at the time, Australian actress Haralabidou had to spend time in managed isolation and quarantine prior to filming.

=== Filming ===
The Moon Is Upside Down was filmed in 2021 during COVID-19 lockdowns over a period of 22 days on a budget of NZ$1.5 million. One of the shooting locations was a scenic highway section near Wainuiomata. The film's producers were Philippa Campbell and Georgina Conder.

=== Post-production ===
Wētā FX performed visual effects work on the film. The film was edited part-time over a period of year, with producers Campbell and Conder being involved in the editing process. The film's editor was Simon Price while David Long composed the film's music score.

== Release ==
The Moon Is Upside Down had its world premiere at the 2023 Tallinn Black Nights Film Festival on 11 November 2023. The film was also screened at the 2024 Sydney Film Festival between 8 and 9 June.

The film had its general release in New Zealand on 2 May 2024.

== Reception ==
Karl Puschmann of The New Zealand Herald gave a The Moon Is Upside Down a positive review, writing "the balancing act of capturing its unique tone, which manages to be both hopeful and jaded, is a credit to its sharp, honest writing, straightforward direction and consistently wonderful acting." He praised the performances of the main cast members Loren Taylor, Victoria Haralabidou, Elizabeth Hawthorne as well as the supporting cast members Jemaine Clement, Robyn Malcolm, Karen O'Leary, Robbie Magasiva and Rachel House, which he opined strengthened the film's believability. Puschmann characterised the film as "more of an arthouse dramedy" than a "rom-com."

Graeme Tuckett of Stuff gave a positive review, awarding the film four stars. He wrote that "The Moon Is Upside Down will be a polarising and provocative entry into the local roster. It swings from tender and reflective one moment, to raucous and gleefully filthy the next, without striking a false note." Tuckett praised the performances of main cast members Taylor, Haralabidou, Hawthrone and the supporting cast members Malcolm, Clement, House and Magasiva. He also observed that the three storylines were intertwined and connected.

RNZ's reviewer gave the film a negative review, commenting that it is "a film entirely full of unlikeable characters. A trio of plots that are so anxious to avoid the obvious that they mostly just fizzle out. A comedy with no discernible jokes." He described Clement, Malcolm and Magasiva's characters as unlikeable and criticised the casting of House's character.
