= Brad McGann =

New Zealand film director and screenwriter

- Born: 22 February 1964; Auckland, New Zealand
- Died: 2 May 2007 (aged 43); Auckland, New Zealand
- Education: University of Otago; Victorian College of the Arts
- Occupation: Filmmaker

Brad McGann MNZM (22 February 1964 – 2 May 2007), was a New Zealand film director and screenwriter.

McGann was born in Auckland, New Zealand in 1964. He completed a Bachelor of Commerce degree at the University of Otago and in 1988 completed a one-year post-graduate course at the Swinburne School of Film and Television (now a part of the Victorian College of the Arts) in Melbourne. He directed the drama It Never Rains in 1996 as well as co-directing the documentary Come As You Are for the Australian Broadcasting Corporation (ABC), and the award-winning short film Possum.

In 2004 and 2005 McGann won international acclaim for his first full-length feature film, In My Father's Den, which was based on Maurice Gee's novel. McGann wrote the screenplay and directed the film.

The film won the Fipresci Prize at the 2004 Toronto International Film Festival and the Mercedes Benz Youth Jury Prize at the 52nd San Sebastian Film Festival in Spain in the same year, and the Special Jury Prize at the Seattle International Film Festival in 2005. It became one of the top 10 grossing New Zealand films.

McGann was made a Member of the New Zealand Order of Merit in the 2006 New Years Honours List. He died on 2 May 2007 after a long battle with bowel cancer, having first been diagnosed in 1998.
