= No One Can Hear You (film) =

2001 film New Zealand thriller

- Directed by: John Laing
- Written by: Ian Coughlan; Craig Cronin; John Laing
- Produced by: Grant Bradley; Richard Stewart
- Starring: Kelly McGillis; Kate Elliott; Tom Huntington
- Cinematography: Simon Baumfield
- Edited by: Bryan Shaw
- Music by: Bruce Lynch
- Production company: Daybreak Pacific
- Release date: 2001
- Running time: 95 minutes
- Country: New Zealand
- Language: English

No One Can Hear You is a 2001 New Zealand thriller directed by John Laing.

== Synopsis ==
A thriller about an ordinary family whose life is disrupted by a house-guest who turns out to be a serial killer.

== Cast ==
- Kelly McGillis as Trish Burchall
- Kate Elliott as Lisa Burchall
- Tom Huntington as Ben Kelly
- Kieren Hutchison as Robert Player
- Emily Barclay as Amy Burchall
- Barry Corbin as Sheriff Joe Webster
- Daniel Gillies as Dirk Mettcalfe
- Craig Parker as Henley
- Jaime Passier-Armstrong as Tracey Johnson
- Elizabeth Hawthorne as Pat Kelly
- Joanna Morrison as Rachel Watson
- Michael Saccente as Dr. Benson McArthur
- Jim McLarty as Mack Nolan
- Chic Littlewood as Doc Everet
- Geoff Dolan as Deputy Phil
- Merv Smith as Jack Foster
- Rebecca Goldsmith as Shirley (voice)

== Reviews ==
The film was classified as "Suitable only for 15 years and over" by the British Board of Film Classification.
