= Crooked Earth =

2001 film by Sam Pillsbury

- Directed by: Sam Pillsbury
- Written by: Greg McGee
- Produced by: Robin Scholes
- Starring: Temuera Morrison; Jaime Passier-Armstrong; Lawrence Makoare
- Distributed by: Pandora Film
- Release date: 2001
- Country: New Zealand

Crooked Earth is a 2001 New Zealand film directed by Sam Pillsbury and starring Temuera Morrison. The film opened to negative reviews and performed poorly at the box office.

== Plot ==
The film follows Will Bastion (Morrison) as he returns home from the army after 20 years to bury his father. Upon returning home, tradition dictates that Will must take the tribal chief position. Due to his disinterest in the role, his brother Kahu (Makoare) takes charge as he appoints himself with the position. Faced with Kahu's drug-dealing and radical views, Bastion must decide if he should act.

== Cast ==
- Temuera Morrison as Will Bastion
- Lawrence Makoare as Kahu Bastion
- Jaime Passier-Armstrong as Ripeka Bastion
- Quinton Hita as Api
- Nancy Brunning as Marama
- Sydney Jackson as Pettigrew
- George Henare as Tipene
- Calvin Tuteao as Sergeant Ropiha
- Stan Wolfgramm as Timo
