= Michelle Langstone =

New Zealand actress (born 1979)

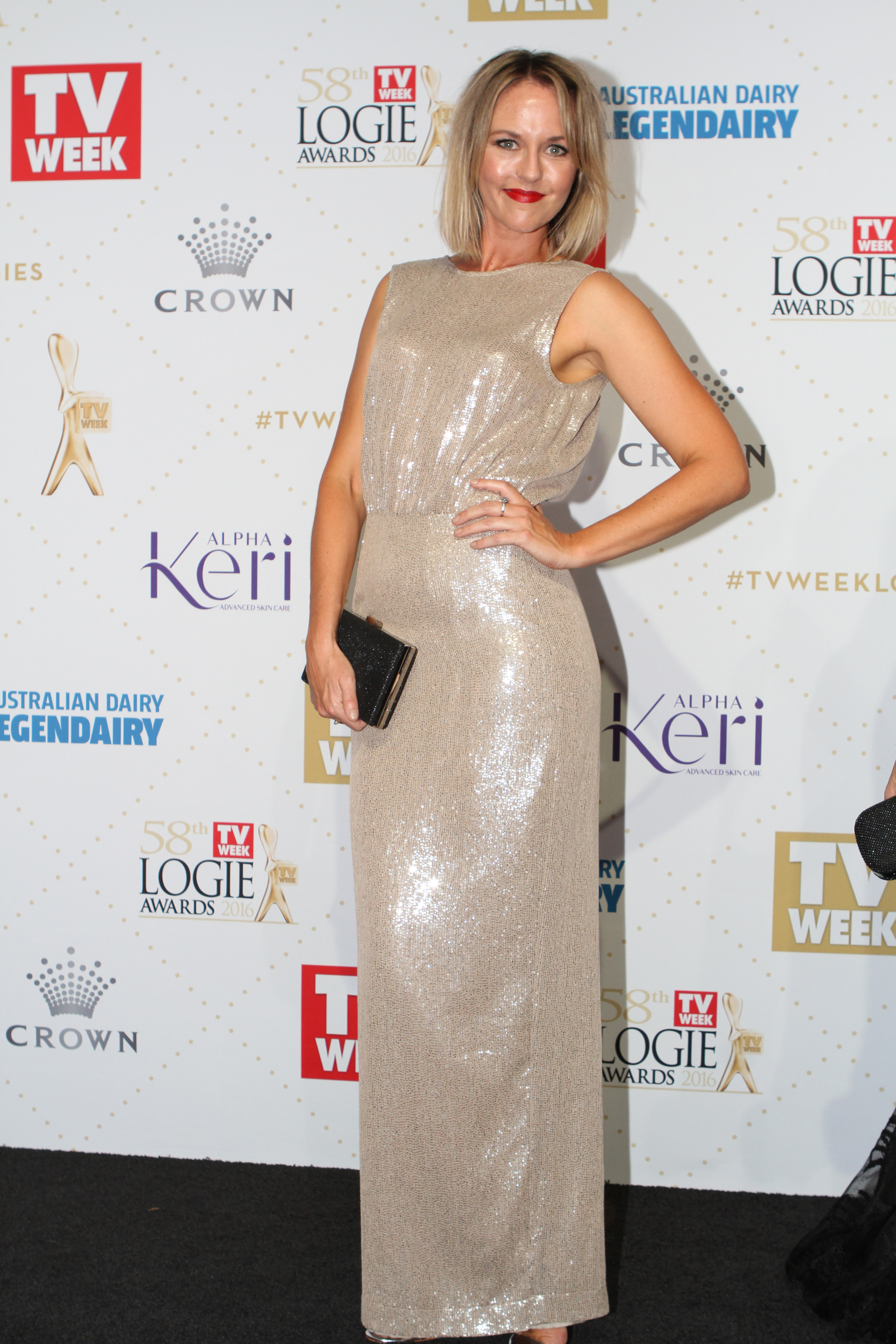
- Langstone at the 58th Annual Logie Awards in 2016
- Born: 30 January 1979 (age 47); New Zealand
- Occupation: Actress
- Years active: 2000 – present

Michelle Langstone (born 30 January 1979) is a New Zealand actress, writer, and author who has been in many films and television series over the years in both New Zealand, and in Australia. She starred as Dr. Katherine "Kat" Manx in the television series Power Rangers S.P.D., and later appeared as Master Guin in Power Rangers Jungle Fury. She also featured as Livia in 2008 action fiction series Legend of The Seeker.

Her debut book, the memoir Times Like These: On Grief, Hope, and Remarkable Love, was published by Allen and Unwin in May 2021.

== Filmography ==
=== Film ===
Year	Title	Role	Notes
2001	The Waiting Place	Amber	
2003	For Good	Lisa	
2007	The Final Winter	Mia	
2009	I'm Not Harry Jenson	Natalee	
2009	Separation City	Julie	
2010	After the Waterfall	Lisa	
2014	Realiti	Selma	Post-production

=== Television ===
Year	Title	Role	Notes
2000	Shortland Street	Susan Morris	TV series
2000	Xena: Warrior Princess	Lana	Episode: "Who's Gurkhan?"
2001	Being Eve	Miss Renee	Episodes: "Being Beautiful", "Being Bad"
2001	Spin Doctors	Melissa Swann	TV series
2002	Superfire	Tracy Torrock	TV film
2003	The Strip	Tre	Regular role (18 episodes)
2005	Power Rangers S.P.D.	Dr. Katherine 'Kat' Manx / Kat Ranger	Main role (38 episodes)
2006	McLeod's Daughters	Fiona "Fee" Lauren Webb	Recurring role (28 episodes)
2008	Power Rangers Jungle Fury	Master Guinn	Episodes: "Ghost of a Chance: Parts 1 & 2", "Now the Final Fury"
2009	Legend of the Seeker	Livia	Episode: "Sanctuary"
2009	Diplomatic Immunity	Svetlana	Episode: "All Eyez on Me"
2001	This Is Not My Life	Sarah	Episodes: "1.9", "1.10"
2011–2013	The Almighty Johnsons	Michele Brock	Regular role (21 episodes)
2013	Go Girls	Sarah Bennett	Recurring role (10 episodes)
2015–2018	800 Words	Fiona	Regular role (40 episodes)
2019	Westside	Bianca Figgs	Recurring role (8 episodes)
2020–2021	One Lane Bridge	Charlotte McCrae	Regular role (11 episodes)
2023	The Brokenwood Mysteries	Julianne/ Bonnie	Episode: "Going to the Dogs"
2024	Celebrity Treasure Island 2024	Herself	TVNZ

== Writing ==
Langstone has regularly contributed articles, travel stories, and essays to New Zealand publications such as The Spinoff, the New Zealand Herald, and North & South.

She won a 2020 Voyager Media Award for Best Interview or Profile and a 2021 Voyager Media Award for Best First Person Essay.

Her debut memoir Times Like These: On Grief, Hope, and Remarkable Love was released to critical acclaim. Kete reviewer Ruth Spencer wrote: "The practicalities and incremental tragedies of death are made newly poignant by the depth of Langstone’s perception. Readers who have experienced deep grief will be hit hard and early by moments that utterly destroy composure."

At Newsroom, Madison Hamill wrote: "As you might expect from a talented actress, she has great skill in observing the little things people do that reveal the heart of who they are".
