= Her Majesty (2001 film) =

2001 film by Mark J. Gordon

- Directed by: Mark J. Gordon
- Written by: Mark J. Gordon
- Produced by: Walter Coblenz
- Starring: Sally Andrews; Alison Routledge; Vicky Haughton; Liddy Holloway
- Cinematography: Stephen Katz
- Edited by: Virginia Katz
- Music by: William Ross
- Distributed by: Panorama Entertainment
- Release dates: 6 October 2001 (Mill Valley Film Festival); 30 April 2004 (United States)
- Running time: 105 minutes
- Country: New Zealand
- Language: English

Her Majesty is a 2001 coming of age film about a young girl who realises her lifelong dream when Queen Elizabeth II comes to visit her small hometown. Directed by Mark J. Gordon, this New Zealand made, family-friendly feature film, is the winner of over 20 festival awards, including the Audience Award at Florida, Newport Beach, Stonybrook, World Cinema Naples and Marco Island.

Vicky Haughton who co-stars in Her Majesty went on to play the grandmother in the movie Whale Rider. She also had a part in King Kong. Walter Coblenz, the producer, was also producer on such films as All the President's Men, The Candidate, and The Onion Field. Virginia Katz, the editor, also edited Kinsey and Dreamgirls. Production designer Kim Sinclair also won an Academy Award in 2010 for his work on Avatar.

== Synopsis ==
Elizabeth Wakefield (Sally Andrews), a young girl who lives in Middleton, New Zealand during the 1950s, idolizes Queen Elizabeth II and writes to her continuously when she hears that the Queen will be making a visit to New Zealand, to convince her to make her town one of the stops. The town was built on land originally owned by the Maori, the indigenous people of New Zealand. The thoughts in the town are that the Maori are not to be trusted, and there is resentment as the young boys of the local tribe start to take jobs from the white English townspeople.

Elizabeth's brother is one such who had his job taken, because he was lazy and unsuitable. He lies to his family so his father will continue to make his car payments for him. However, he decides to take his animosity out on the local "crazy" Maori lady, Hira Mata (Vicky Haughton). She was the daughter of the chief of the tribe, and very proud of her heritage and stubborn and resentful of the local ladies auxiliary that continually tries to get her to sell the last piece of the land the tribe owns...the land her house is built on, which comprises several acres. Her window is broken by Elizabeth's brother, leading Elizabeth to steal the money he has hidden in his room to anonymously pay Hira back for the damage.

That plan somewhat fails as the ground is very muddy, and the porch around Hira's house squeaks when she steps on it. Hira comes to investigate the noise, causing Elizabeth and her best friend Annabel to turn tail and run into hiding quickly. Elizabeth loses a shoe, and goes back the next day, hoping to get it back before Hira notices she is there. Hira however was expecting that whoever lost the shoe knew who had broken her window, if they weren't directly responsible for it themselves. She terrifies Elizabeth at first, but she is struck by the presence of Hira and decides to try to help her out.

Over the coming weeks, Elizabeth and Hira form a strong bond of friendship and a sense of family. In the meantime, the Queen has decided to stop in the town of Middleton and the ladies auxiliary is buzzing with ways to show her the best parts of the town. Elizabeth's father believes his cheese factory should be one of the stops, but is blocked at every turn by the granddaughter of the founder of the town. She plans to have the Queen go see her rhododendron trust, where she has cultivated several acres of this flower. She also plans to give to the Queen a pair of pearl-handled silver dueling pistols, presumably given to her grandfather by the Queen's great uncle.

Elizabeth learns of this, and despite her father not wanting her to visit Hira, she goes to the house and learns the pistols were actually given to Hira's father, the chief of the tribe. He had given in return a gift of his ceremonial spear. Elizabeth uses every trick she can to keep the ladies of the town from blocking Hira from the queen, so her story can be told. This leads to her learning about the history of the tribe, and coming to respect them so much, she adopts them. This has disastrous consequences in how she is treated around the town. She was in line to lead her drill team squad in the parade for the Queen, which would have allowed her to greet the Queen and present her case about the pistols. However the headmaster threatened the instructor for the squad, and Annabel was chosen instead.

Not willing to give up, Elizabeth plans to march in the parade anyway to try to find a way to present her case. Her brother and his group of bully boys discover her and lock her in her dog Kupe's pen. Annabel is worried, and goes to find her. Elizabeth manages to escape by cutting the rope tying the gate shut with the medallion Hira gave her. Together, she and Annabel discover the Queen has received all the letters Elizabeth had been writing, and was so intrigued by her story of Hira Mata, she decided to make that her stop in Middleton. When Annabel defers to Elizabeth about presenting the pistols, she is finally able to state her case. The Queen not only agrees, but returns to Hira Mata her father's ceremonial spear, as a gesture of good will and friendship between the Maori tribe and the English Crown.

== Release ==
Her Majesty was first released theatrically in the U.S. in April 2004 and continued to screen in select cities through March 2005, with positive reviews. The film was released in January 2005 in New Zealand to positive reviews, though it performed poorly at the box office, perhaps due to limited promotion and exposure. Her Majesty also screened theatrically in provinces throughout Canada from January to May 2006 in association with the Film Circuit, a division of the Toronto International Film Festival. The North American (Region 1) DVD of Her Majesty was released on 29 August 2006.

The film has also been licensed in various territories around the world, including the UK, Australia, South America, Scandinavia, Belgium, Greece, Turkey, Israel, Russia, Eastern Europe, Middle East, Thailand, South Africa, and others, where it's often shown on TV.

=== Accolades ===
Sally Andrews won the Best Actress Award at the San Diego Film Festival for her role in the film in 2004.
