= Philippa Campbell =

New Zealand film producer, dramaturg

Philippa Campbell is a New Zealand film and television producer and the Literary Manager at the Auckland Theatre Company.

== Theatre ==
Philippa Campbell began her career in the theatre as an actor and director in the 1980s. In 1981, she was involved in establishing Taki Rua in Wellington, the first professional theatre dedicated to New Zealand theatre and a key venue for indigenous and bicultural performances and theatrical development through the 1980s and 1990s. She was a member of Downstage Theatre Company. Campbell directed and helped to establish the Frontline theatre company.

Campbell has a long association with the New Zealand International Arts Festival, having worked on many productions commissioned by the festival, and has worked with well-known New Zealand playwrights including Hone Kouka, Briar Grace Smith, Victor Rodger, and Theatre at Large.

Campbell has been the dramaturge for two chamber operas and the aerial pageant show Maui.

Since November 2008, Campbell has been the Auckland Theatre Company's Literary Manager.

Campbell has a history of working with Wellington-based percussion group Strike, including directing their 2013 show Between Zero and One.

== Film and television ==
For several years in the 1980s, Campbell ran Television New Zealand's in-house Drama Department Script Unit, editing over 100 hours of television drama. Some of Campbell script editing credits include New Zealand television shows and feature films such as Marlin Bay (1992-94), Mirror, Mirror (1995), Bread and Roses (1993), Erua (1988), Maurice Gee's The Fire Raiser (1986), and the award-winning Erebus: the Aftermath, which was written by Greg McGee. In 1988, she departed TVNZ to forge an independent career in television and film as a writer, script consultant, and development executive.

Campbell made a break into screen producing with the Banff Television Festival nominee for best drama, Swimming Lessons in 1995, written by Simon Wilson and directed by Steve LaHood.

Campbell's first feature film as producer was Via Satellite in 1998 (winner of two New Zealand Screen Awards), written and directed by Anthony McCarten, and produced by Campbell's new company, Escapade Pictures.

She followed up Via Satellite by producing Christine Jeffs' acclaimed Rain, which premiered in Director’s Fortnight in Cannes in 2002 and was nominated for Best Film at the 2001 New Zealand Film Awards.

In 2006 Campbell co-produced No. 2 (released in North America under the title Naming Number Two), written and directed by Toa Fraser. Starring Academy Award nominee Ruby Dee, the film won the Audience Award in the 2006 Sundance Film Festival’s World Cinema Dramatic section, the Audience Award at the Brisbane International Film Festival, four awards at the New Zealand Film Awards, and featured in gala screenings at the London Film Festival.

In 2007, Campbell produced Jonathan King's comic-horror film Black Sheep, an audience favourite at the Toronto International Film Festival. Black Sheep is the second-highest grossing New Zealand film in the UK, and the highest grossing New Zealand horror film in New Zealand.

Following Black Sheep, Campbell was included in Variety magazine’s “10 Producers to Watch” list for 2007.

In 2008, Campbell produced Florian Habicht’s documentary Rubbings From a Live Man, performed by Warwick Broadhead, which was nominated for Best Picture (budget under $1 million) at the 2008 Qantas Film and Television Awards. After Rubbings from a Live Man, Campbell produced a short film directed by Dan Salmon, Licked.

Campbell produced season 1 and 2 of Jane Campion's 2013/2017 television miniseries Top of the Lake, which premiered at the Sundance Film Festival. Top of the Lake won an Emmy Award, two Golden Globes, and a New Zealand Film Award.

Campbell has consulted to screen production development workshops in New Zealand, Australia, India, and Italy.

Campbell then went on to work on a number of creative projects including Shiver, set in Antarctica, The Beach of Falesa, adapted from the novella by Robert Louis Stevenson. She is the Executive Producer for Paolo Rotundo's film Orphans and Kingdoms.

In 2015, Campbell formed a new Auckland-based production company, Field Theory, with producers Fiona Copeland and Tim Sanders, chief executive Lyoyd Meiklejohn, and consultant Michael Eldred.

In June 2021, Campbell was announced as a producer of They Are Us, a film based on the 2019 Christchurch mosque shootings. Following public outcry, she initially defended the film while acknowledging the challenges, but she later quit.

== Biographical information ==
Philippa Campbell was born in 1955 in Auckland, New Zealand and grew up in Lower Hutt and Wellington, New Zealand. Campbell attended Hutt Valley High School and has a B.A. in English Literature, Philosophy, and Drama from Victoria University of Wellington. She is an acting graduate of Toi Whakaari: The New Zealand Drama School, having graduated in 1977.

Campbell is married to journalist Simon Wilson and lives in Auckland, New Zealand. They have two sons.

== Filmography ==
=== Film ===
Year	Title	Role	Notes
1992	The Wall	Script editor	Short film
1998	Via Satellite	Producer	
2001	Rain	Producer	
2001	No. 2	Producer	
2007	Black Sheep	Producer	
2008	Rubbings from a Live Man	Producer, Co-Creator	
2014	Orphans and Kingdoms	Executive Producer	
2017	The Inland Road	Executive Producer	
2024	The Moon Is Upside Down	Producer	

=== Television ===
Year	Title	Role	Notes
1981–1997	Wild South	Script editor	
1982	Loose Enz - Eros and Psyche	Actor	Campbell only acting credits
1984–85	Country GP	Script editor	
1986	The Fire-Raiser	Script editor	based on the book by Maurice Gee
1988	Erua	Script editor	Based on the friendship between artist Toss Woollaston and a young Māori boy
1989	The Shadow Trader	Script consultant	Miniseries
2014	The Champion - Yankee Soldier	Script editor	based on the book by Maurice Gee
1989	Under the Ice	Script editor	Miniseries
1992	Masters of Inner Space	Script editor	documentary
1992–94	Marlin Bay	Script editor	
1992	Emperors of Antarctica	Script editor	documentary
1993	Joyful and Triumphant	Script editor	
1993	Bread and Roses	Script editor	Made for TV biographical based on autobiography of Sonja Davies
1995–97	Mirror, Mirror	Script editor	
1995	Swimming Lessons	Associate Producer, Script editor	
1998–2000	Backch@t	Script editor	Was the subject of the show for one episode
2012–13	Top of the Lake	Producer	New Zealand-based producer
2017	Top of the Lake 2: China Girl	Producer	New Zealand-based producer
