= Vicky Haughton =

New Zealand actress

- Born: New Zealand
- Occupation: Actress

Vicky Haughton is a New Zealand actress. She won the 2003 New Zealand Film Award for Best Supporting Actress for her role in Whale Rider and was nominated for the 2001 Nokia New Zealand Film Award for Best Actress for her role in Her Majesty.

Haughton featured in 1980-81 musical TV series 12 Bar Rhythm 'n' Shoes and after that finished she went on to front a 1982 show with two fellow 12 Bar cast members titled VJM (an acronym of Vicky, Jane and Maggie). It was a five show musical entertainment series that featured male guest singers. Later that year she took over from Alita in the fourth series of Radio Times.

She featured in the 2001 mockumentary Love Mussel, plays the elderly Maori lady, Hira Mata in Her Majesty, and appears as Nanny Flowers in Whale Rider. Other screen roles include the band manager in Heroes, Ms. Seagar in In My Father's Den and Grace in Kawa.

Haughton has appeared on stage in plays and musicals including the 2004 stage musical version of The Whale Rider, reprising her role from the film as well as playing a leader of the whales, playing Emare in Home Fires, by Hone Kouka, (Downstage Theatre, 1998), and featuring in the musical Jerry's Girls (Court Theatre, 1994).
