= The Frog, the Dog and the Devil =

1986 NZ Academy Award nominated animated short film

- Directed by: Bob Stenhouse
- Written by: Ernie Slow
- Produced by: Hugh Macdonald; Martin Townsend
- Narrated by: Grant Tilly
- Cinematography: Bob Stenhouse
- Production company: National Film Unit
- Release date: 1986
- Running time: 10 minutes
- Country: New Zealand
- Language: English

The Frog, the Dog and the Devil is a 1986 New Zealand short animated film. It was nominated for an Academy Award for Short Film (Animated) at the 59th Academy Awards.

== Synopsis ==
Warning against the demon drink in an animated feature.
