= Paul Glover (actor) =

New Zealand actor

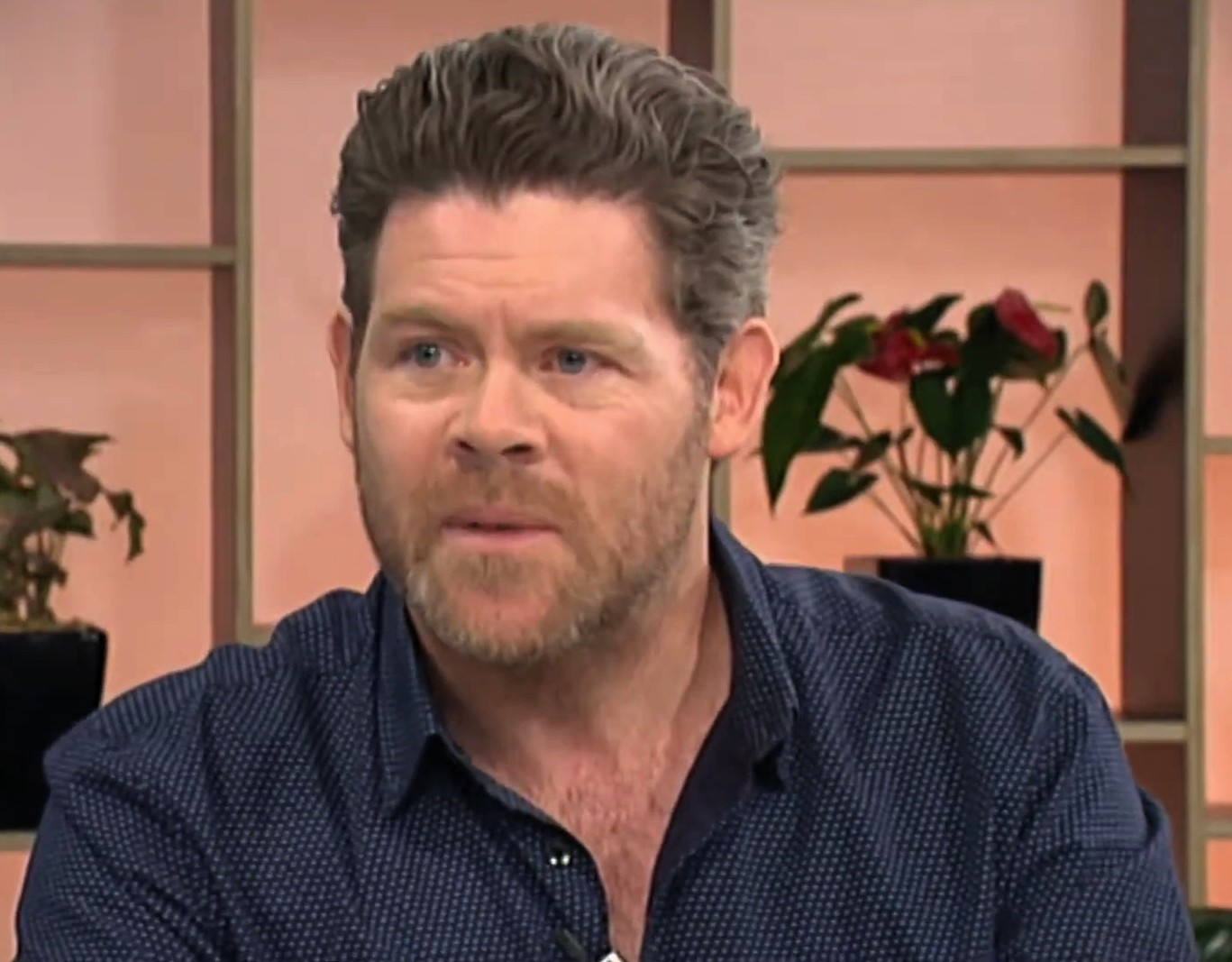
- Glover in 2018
- Born: 1972 (age 53–54); Auckland, New Zealand
- Occupation: Actor
- Years active: 1993-present

Paul Glover (born 1972) is a New Zealand actor. He appeared in more than thirty films since 1993.

== Selected filmography ==
Year	Title	Role	Notes
1997	The Ugly	Philip	
2001	Snakeskin	Terry	
2003	Perfect Strangers	Jim	
2003	The Locals	Martin	
2006	Out of the Blue	Paul Knox	
