= Glenn Standring =

New Zealand film director and writer

Glenn Standring is a New Zealand scriptwriter, producer and film director, working in the action, horror and fantasy genres.

He is from Feilding in the North Island of New Zealand. He is descended from Glaswegians and Mancunians on the European side and the Ngāpuhi tribe on the New Zealand side.

Standring studied film at the Ilam School of Fine Arts, and completed a first class honours degree in archaeology from The University of Otago in Dunedin.

== Career ==
His last short film was the experimental computer animation Lenny Minute One which was selected for the 1993 short film competition at Cannes Film Festival.

His first feature film as writer/director was the low-budget film The Irrefutable Truth about Demons (2000), which was nominated for best film awards at fantasy film festivals in Portugal and Spain.

Standring's second film was Perfect Creature. The film was an ambitious horror/thriller set in an alternative universe New Zealand that incorporated elements of history and fantasy. In this world vampires are protectors of mankind, rather than the enemy. The film sold to 20th Century Fox at a reportedly record price for a New Zealand film.

His third feature film as a writer and producer, The Dead Lands, was released in 2014. The film is a Māori language action feature shot in Auckland and the central North Island of New Zealand. It features the Māori martial art Mau Rakau, a unique hand-to-hand fighting style not well known outside of New Zealand. The film was a box office hit at home reaching number 1 at the New Zealand box office and garnered a Special Presentation slot on the opening day of the Toronto International Film Festival and was in Deborah Young's (Hollywood Reporter) Top 10 Festival Films of the Year, receiving plaudits from James Cameron and Peter Jackson. It was New Zealand's entry for the Oscars for Best Foreign Language Film.

He was Writer and Executive Producer on the UK-NZ thriller 6 Days which featured Abbie Cornish, Mark Strong and Jamie Bell. The Netflix Original screened at the BFI London Film Festival and drew praise from Total Film “drum-tight with tension” and the UK's Sunday Times as “unexpectedly thoughtful”.

He also worked as a writer on the McLaren documentary directed by Roger Donaldson.

In 2020 he was Executive Producer and Creator of The Dead Lands, an 8-part series horror/fantasy series produced for AMC/Shudder Networks. Decider called it an exciting and funny Ancient-Māori Riff on the Z-word Genre and Locus Magazine saw it as a first-rate action adventure supernatural horror series.
