= Kawa (film) =

- Original film poster
- Directed by: Katie Wolfe
- Written by: Kate McDermott
- Based on: Nights in the Gardens of Spain by Witi Ihimaera
- Starring: Calvin Tuteao; Dean O'Gorman; Nathalie Boltt; George Henare; Vicky Haughton
- Cinematography: Fred Renata
- Edited by: Lisa Hough
- Music by: Joel Haines
- Release date: 17 October 2010 (Hawaii Film Festival)
- Country: New Zealand
- Languages: English; Māori language

Kawa is a 2010 New Zealand film directed by Katie Wolfe originally titled Nights in the Gardens of Spain. The film stars Calvin Tuteao as Kawariki. A coming out film drama, it is based on the novel Nights in the Gardens of Spain by Witi Ihimaera.

== Plot ==
The film tells the story of Kawariki (Calvin Tuteao), an apparently happy family man married to Annabelle (Nathalie Boltt). His father, Hamiora (George Henare), is retiring and according to Maori tradition, Kawariki should be prepared to take over his father's place as head of the family. However, he realises that to do so, he must keep his integrity and reveal his lifelong secret of being gay ever since childhood. He has been desperately fighting his feelings for years, but he now frequents gay baths and he has a love affair with Chris (Dean O'Gorman).

Things get more complicated and acquire more urgency when his mother, Grace (Vicky Haughton), discovers him kissing Chris on the beach after a fight between the two and decides to expel him from her house. When he finally comes out to his father and his wife, it is too late for Chris, who has moved in with another partner after waiting for so long for him.

Kawa has to quit home but is torn with his love for his son, Sebastian (Pana Hema Taylor), and his daughter, Miranda (Miriama-Jane Devantier). Meanwhile, his daughter's absolute attachment to him is the catalyst for the family coming back together.

The film ends with a scene in which Kawa's father is reconciled with himself and visits his son at his new residence to deliver him the traditional Maori emblem.

== Accolades ==
During the 2011 New Zealand Film and TV Awards, Dean O'Gorman was nominated for the award for "Best Performance by a Supporting Actor" for his role as Chris in the film.

== Cast ==
- Calvin Tuteao as Kawariki
- Nathalie Boltt as Annabelle
- George Henare as Hamiora
- Vicky Haughton as Grace
- Dean O'Gorman as Chris
- Pana Hema Taylor as Sebastian
- Miriama-Jane Devantier as Miranda
- Geoffrey Snell as Walter
- Jarod Rawiri as Wayne
- Jack Walley as Coach
- Bridget Pyc as Emily
