= Nemesis Game =

- Directed by: Jesse Warn
- Written by: Jesse Warn
- Produced by: Matthew Metcalfe; Suzanne Berger
- Starring: Carly Pope; Adrian Paul; Ian McShane
- Cinematography: Aaron Morton
- Music by: Frank Ilfman
- Production company: Lionsgate
- Distributed by: Lionsgate
- Release date: 2003
- Running time: 92 minutes
- Countries: Canada; New Zealand; United Kingdom
- Language: English
- Budget: $3,000,000 (estimated)

Nemesis Game is a 2003 mystery-thriller film directed and written by Jesse Warn. The story itself involves the main character, Sara Novak (played by Carly Pope), solving complex riddles and mysterious deaths of people around her.

== Plot ==
The main character of the movie is Sara Novak, a college student who, along with comic book store owner named Vern (played by Adrian Paul), spend their time solving riddles. The movie takes a twist when the riddles lead to the death of her friend Jeremy (played by Jay Baruchel), leaving Sara to fear whether she is someone else's game.

== Cast ==
- Carly Pope as Sara Novak
- Ian McShane as Jeff Novak
- Adrian Paul as Vern
- Rena Owen as Emily Gray
- Brendan Fehr as Dennis Reveni
- Jay Baruchel as Jeremy Curran
- Vanessa Guy as Marie
- Eve Crawford as Lea
- Richard Fitzpatrick as Tom
- Ron Pardo as News Anchor #1
- Tony Munch as Bearded Man
- Michael Kinney as Doctor
- Philip Williams as Police MC
- Victor A. Young as Professor (as Victor Young)

== Awards and nominations ==
2003 New Zealand Film Awards

Awards:

- Makeup – Barbara Barkey
- Design – Peter Cosco
- Editing – Bruce Lange
- Cinematography – Aaron Morton

Nominations:

- Best Film
- Best Contribution to a Soundtrack – Frank Ilfman
- Best Costume Design – Shelley Mansell
- Best Director – Jesse Warn
- Best Screenplay – Jesse Warn
