= Rain (2001 New Zealand film) =

2001 New Zealand film by Christine Jeffs

- French theatrical poster
- Directed by: Christine Jeffs
- Written by: Christine Jeffs
- Produced by: Philippa Campbell
- Starring: Marton Csokas; Aaron Murphy; Alicia Fulford-Wierzbicki; Alistair Browning
- Cinematography: John Toon
- Edited by: Paul Maxwell
- Music by: Neil Finn; Edmund McWilliams
- Production company: New Zealand Film Commission
- Release dates: 2001 (New Zealand); 2002 (U.S.)
- Running time: 92 minutes
- Country: New Zealand
- Language: English

Rain is a 2001 New Zealand drama film directed by Christine Jeffs. A debut film by Jeffs, it was released in New Zealand in 2001 and internationally in 2002. It concerns the coming of age of 13-year-old Janey, and is based on the novel Rain, written by Kirsty Gunn. Rain was produced by Philippa Campbell.

== Plot ==
Janey is on vacation with her brother Jim, mother Kate, and father Ed, at their beach house on the Mahurangi Peninsula in New Zealand. Ed and Kate, who are on the verge of divorce, sit in the backyard all day drinking whisky, leaving their young children to amuse and fend for themselves. Cady, a local boatie who is having an affair with Kate, catches Janey's pubescent eye. In response to his wife's problems with alcohol and infidelity, Ed turns to alcohol, neglecting his children almost as much as his wife. When Janey sees Cady photographing Kate on his boat, she persuades him to take pictures of her as well. Then, like her mother, she wants something else from him.

Leaving little Jim alone on the beach, Janey leads Cady high into the woods. After posing for him, she takes his camera and tells him how to pose. She adjusts his shirt and tells him to strip off. Then she puts his camera aside and starts touching him all over. They kiss, her head tilts back, and the screen goes black-and-white.

In the next scene, a camera shot from far above shows Janey as she lies alone in the woods naked. She is next seen walking back down the woody hillside to the beach with her clothes on. Off in the distance she sees her brother's body. She runs the length of the beach to him, screaming his name.

When she reaches him, she launches into frenzied CPR. Her father arrives and takes over the CPR. Janey begs him, "Make him breathe!" and when he says he is trying, she yells at him that he is not. They eventually accept that they are too late to save Jim and, by extension, the family.

== Cast ==
- Alicia Fulford-Wierzbicki as Janey
- Marton Csokas as Cady
- Aaron Murphy as Jim
- Alison Routledge as Heather
- Sarah Peirse as Kate
- Alistair Browning as Ed

== Location ==
Rain was shot on location around the Mahurangi Peninsula on the eastern coast of New Zealand's North Island in April–May 2000, with the coastal beach and mudflats replacing Lake Taupō which was the setting of the novel the film was based upon. The central location was Scandretts Bay beach in Scandrett Regional Park, prior to conservation work being completed.

== See also ==
- Nymphet
