= Perfect Creature =

- Directed by: Glenn Standring
- Written by: Glenn Standring
- Produced by: Tim Sanders, Russel Fischer and Haneet Vaswani
- Starring: Dougray Scott; Saffron Burrows; Leo Gregory
- Cinematography: Leon Narbey
- Edited by: Chris Blunden
- Music by: Anne Dudley
- Distributed by: Magna Pacific
- Release date: 2007
- Country: New Zealand
- Language: English
- Budget: $20 million

Perfect Creature is a 2007 New Zealand vampire film, written and directed by Glenn Standring and starring Saffron Burrows and Dougray Scott, set in an alternate universe New Zealand; it premiered in New Zealand on 18 October 2007.

== Plot ==
In a world where males born as vampires join the Brotherhood and drink donated blood from human churchgoers, rather than being killed at birth as in the past, a pregnant woman gives birth to a vampire. A teenaged Brother, Silus, is told that he and this child, Edgar, are from the same mother. The mother, who is in visible distress, reaches for Silus across the room.

A hundred years later, the Jamestown slum sees a series of attacks on women, all found with their throats bitten. Lilly Squires leads the human police in investigations. She comes from a workhouse in Jamestown and is one of the few cops who care about the slum residents. A boy who witnessed an attack tells her a Brother was responsible. To avoid public panic, the police claims the deaths result from an outbreak of influenza, which is seen as one of the evils that came from genetic research.

Church cardinals ask Silus to work with the human police. The Brothers know the attacks were carried out by a Brother: Silus's brother, Edgar. Edgar sends Silus a recording of his last murder, challenging Silus to stop him before he kills again. Edgar includes the location of his next planned murder. With Silus's help, Lilly puts together a task force to stake out the area. Edgar attacks Lilly and bites her before fleeing. To save Lilly, Silus tells her to drink his blood. When he visits her in hospital, it is revealed that she lost her family to influenza. Lilly has visions from drinking Silus's blood. The newspapers publish a false story of the death of the killer.

Edgar is restrained in a spiked brace in the church basement. Silus, who is soon to join the "inner circle", is told what happened to Edgar. The cardinals, worried that no Brothers have been born in 70 years and no female vampire has been born ever, conduct genetic research, which they publicly ban. Edgar has been developing a virus to make pregnant women give birth to vampires. The virus mutated and turned the women into violent psychopaths. Ten of his research subjects are dead, and the last one is dying. Edgar is also infected and insane, although the virus is taking effect more slowly due to his immune system. He vows to kill Lilly and accuses Silus of being in love with her, as Brothers are forbidden to love.

While Silus is at the church for his investiture as a cardinal, Edgar escapes to Jamestown. He installs a tap and tube system into his forearm to control the flow of his blood. At Lilly's apartment, Silus and her colleague Jones guard her. Silus imagines kissing her as she sleeps. Edgar bursts through a window and knocks out Silus long enough to take Lilly. Meanwhile, the government institutes a quarantine after the virus spreads throughout Jamestown, and humans riot outside the churches.

Silus finds Edgar tainting Jamestown's water source with his blood. However, each suburb has its own water supply. Another cardinal tells Silus that Jamestown will be burned to the ground to destroy the virus and Edgar. He warns Silus his career will be doomed if he ignores the "greater good" and breaches quarantine to save Lilly. Silus breaks into Jamestown anyway. Lilly, handcuffed in the basement of the aquifer, tries to persuade Edgar to stop. He challenges her about her dead child and says her race is good at abandoning children. He finds Silus, and they fight. After injuring Silus, Edgar threatens to disfigure him. Lilly sneaks up behind Edgar and kills him.

Silus kisses Lilly and tells her to look after what she finds in a building and to keep it away from the Brotherhood. Inside the building, Lilly finds another Brother, a dead woman, and a baby. The Brother says that the infant is the first female vampire ever born, created by the virus: the first Perfect Creature. Although Silus is branded a heretic and remains in hiding, he watches over Lilly as she takes care of the baby.

== Cast ==
- Dougray Scott as Brother Silus
- Saffron Burrows as Capt. Lilly Squires
- Leo Gregory as Senior Brother Edgar
- Stuart Wilson as Senior Brother Augustus
- Scott Wills as Det. Jones
- Lauren A. Jackson as Det. Stephanie Kelly
- Craig Hall as Det. Dominic
- Robbie Magasiva as Det. Frank
- Stephen Ure as Fredrick "Freddy" Sykes
- Peter McCauley as Prof. Liepsky
- Owen Black as Brother
- Ian Mune as Slum landlord

== Production notes ==
Jonathan Rhys-Meyers was originally cast as the villain Edgar, but was forced to leave the production due to other film commitments.

At Cannes in 2005 it was announced that 20th Century Fox had purchased the North American theatrical rights, plus other key territories in what was the largest deal between a major American studio and a New Zealand film.

The Steampunk film was shot primarily around Dunedin and Oamaru in New Zealand's South Island.

== Reception ==
Professional ratings
Review scores
| Source | Rating |
|---|---|
| IGN | 7/10 stars |
| ComingSoon.net | 6/10 stars |
| Monsters & Critics | 3/5 stars |
| Dread Central | No Score |

Adam DiLeo at IGN gave it 7 out of 10 stars.
