= Christine Jeffs =

New Zealand film director

- Born: 29 January 1963 (age 63); Lower Hutt, Wellington, New Zealand
- Occupations: Director, editor and screenwriter.
- Years active: 1990–present

Christine Jeffs (born 29 January 1963) is a New Zealand-born director, editor, and screenwriter.

She is best known for directing the films Rain, Sylvia, and Sunshine Cleaning. Jeffs is also known for her work on television commercials.

== Education and career ==
Jeffs has a 2018 master's degree in fine arts from the University of Auckland, examining the relationship between a photographer and their subject. She began her career by working locally in post-production, most notably as an assistant film editor. Afterwards, Jeffs went on to attend the Australian Film, Television and Radio School, located in Sydney, Australia. Jeffs obtained a diploma in film editing in 1990, after which she held the position of assistant editor on three feature-length films: Ruby and Rata (1990), Crush (1992), and Absent Without Leave (1992).

=== Stroke (1993) ===
From her work as an assistant editor, Jeffs wrote, directed and edited her first short film Stroke in 1993, which unexpectedly gained attention from film festivals like Cannes and Sundance. Following her success with Stroke, Jeffs began to receive offers to direct commercials.

=== Rain ===
Just under a decade after Stroke, Jeffs returned to film, and had her first feature-length debut as a director with Rain, adapted from a 1994 short novel by Kirsty Gunn of the same name. Premiering at the Cannes Directors Fortnight, Rain was highly praised by critics. The following year, Variety included Jeffs in their annual "10 Directors to Watch" lists.

=== Sylvia ===
In 2003, two years after her global success with Rain, Jeffs second feature-length film, Sylvia, was released. Starring Gwyneth Paltrow and Daniel Craig, this film followed the lives of the poets Sylvia Plath and Ted Hughes. Jeffs was requested to take over the project well into production after the previous director left, to which she is stated as saying "[the project] had its blessings and its curses, because it's such a different kettle of fish to become involved with a project at such a late stage – rather than one you sat with and dreamed with and worked on for years." Sylvia was praised by critics.

=== Sunshine Cleaning ===
After Sylvia, Jeffs' third feature-length film, Sunshine Cleaning, was released in 2008 and was written by Megan Holley. The film starred Hollywood actresses Amy Adams and Emily Blunt taking on the roles of two sisters who start a cleaning business specifically for crime-scenes. Alan Arkin also starred in the film as the peculiar father of the two women. Although Sunshine Cleaning was Jeffs' first comedy, she considers her first film, Stroke "kind of funny." Much like Sylvia, Jeffs was brought in as a director after the project had already started.

=== The Girl Film Company ===
Jeffs is said to have co-founded a production company in New Zealand called The Girl Film Company.

== Personal life ==
Jeffs lives in Auckland, New Zealand, with her partner John Toon, who was the cinematographer on all of Jeffs's films.

== Filmography ==
| Film | Year | Role | Notes |
|---|---|---|---|
| Ruby and Rata | 1990 | Assistant Editor | |
| Crush | 1992 | Assistant Editor | |
| Absent Without Leave | 1992 | Assistant Editor | |
| Stroke | 1993 | Director, Screenwriter, Editor | |
| Rain | 2001 | Director, Screenwriter | |
| Sylvia | 2003 | Director | |
| Sunshine Cleaning | 2008 | Director | |
| A Mistake | 2024 | Director, Screenwriter | |

== Awards and nominations ==
| Year | Award | Category | Work | Result | Notes |
|---|---|---|---|---|---|
| 1994 | Chicago International Film Festival | Golden Hugo | Stroke | Nominated | |
| 1995 | New Zealand Film and Television Awards | Best Commercial | NZ Police (Lipstick) | Won | |
| 1996 | TV Guide New Zealand Film and Television Awards | Best Commercial | Bailey's Liquid Silk | Won | |
| 2001 | Nokia New Zealand Film Awards | Best Director | Rain | Nominated | |
| 2001 | Flanders International Film Festival | Golden Spur Award | Rain | Nominated | |
| 2001 | Ghent International Film Festival | Grand Prix Award | Rain | Nominated | |
| 2002 | Asia-Pacific Film Festival | Special Jury Award | Rain | Won | |
| 2008 | Sundance Film Festival | Grand Jury Award | Sunshine Cleaning | Nominated | |
| 2008 | Deauville Film Festival | Grand Special Prize | Sunshine Cleaning | Nominated | |
