= In My Father's Den =

Novel by Maurice Gee

- Author: Maurice Gee
- Language: English
- Published: 1972
- Publication place: New Zealand
- Media type: Print
- Pages: 174
- ISBN: 0571098509

In My Father's Den is a 1972 novel by New Zealand author Maurice Gee.

The novel was adapted to film in 2004, written and directed by Brad McGann.

== First edition ==
- In My Father's Den. London: Faber, 1972. Auckland: Oxford UP, 1978.

The novel follows Paul Prior, an English teacher in Auckland, after the brutal murder of his student and protégé, Celia Inverarity. In coming to terms with Celia's death Paul must first address his past and the demons that lie within it.

The film adaptation follows a very similar storyline. It follows Paul Prior, a world-weary photographer, who returns to central Otago for his father's funeral. The appearance of Celia, who has connections with his past, prompts him to stay and he battles his past while discovering the truth about his childhood and the demons that lie within it.
