= New Zealand International Film Festival =

Annual film festival in New Zealand

- Location: Various
- Founded: 2009
- Most recent: 2026
- Hosted by: New Zealand Film Festival Trust
- Website: NZIFF

The New Zealand International Film Festival (NZIFF) (Māori: Whānau Mārama) is a film festival held annually across New Zealand. The festival is operated by the New Zealand Film Festival Trust. It programmes international and New Zealand films.

== History ==
The festival grew through a merger in 1984 of the Auckland International Film Festival (founded in 1969) and the Wellington Film Festival (founded 1972). In 2009, the festival didn't use regional names and united the various festivals under the banner of the New Zealand International Film Festival (using the abbreviation 'NZIFF'). Until then, each region had been promoted with the region's name despite having shared a common programme and artwork since 2002. The festival has a tradition of supporting New Zealand filmmakers and New Zealand cinema.

In 1996 the New Zealand Film Festival Trust was set up by Bill Sheat, the founding chairperson who remained in that role until 2003.

In 2019 long-serving festival Director Bill Gosden retired after 40 years of service. "I look back with pride on the astounding array of national and international filmmaking that has found its first New Zealand audience at NZIFF. I leave with great confidence that whoever steps up next will be working with a remarkable and cohesive crew who love NZIFF and know it backwards.” said Gosden. New Director Marten Rabarts was appointed in October 2019. Gosden died on the seventh of November 2020.

In early 2020 General Manager Sharon Byrne resigned from the festival after more than twenty years of service and Communications Manager Rebecca McMillan resigned after a decade with the organisation. In November 2021 Director Marten Rabarts stood down from the festival. The Auckland part of the festival was cancelled in 2021 due to COVID-19 restrictions. The Wellington programme screened 164 feature films.

In 2023 there were 129 titles presented in 15 regions, a similar size to before COVID-19 interrupted business. In November 2023 NZIFF released a 10-year strategy, Te Ahua o te Whānau Mārama, citing the effects of the global pandemic and other aspects in New Zealand as affecting the viability of the festival.

In early 2024 five key Festival Programmers all stood down from their roles with NZIFF. Senior Programmer Sandra Reid (after 30 years service); Incredibly Strange Programmer Ant Timpson (after 20 years service); Square Eyes Programmer Nicola Marshall (after 19 years service); Animation Programmer Malcolm Turner (after more than two decades service) and Asian & LGBTQ Programmer Vicci Ho (after four years service). The 2024 festival was originally planned to only include Auckland, Wellington, Christchurch and Dunedin (in fewer venues, and over fewer days), cutting out Hamilton, Tauranga, Palmerston North, New Plymouth, Masterton, Hawke's Bay, Whangarei, Gisborne, Nelson, Gore and Timaru. Then-festival chairperson Catherine Fitzgerald said COVID-19 impacts over 2020, 2021, 2022 and 2023 have impacted the festival. However, in March it was announced that the festival would be occurring as planned in Hamilton, Napier, Nelson, New Plymouth, Masterton, and Tauranga.

=== Auckland ===
Auckland was the first city in the country to have a film festival. Founded in 1969 as a component of the Auckland Festival, the Auckland International Film Festival (AIFF) in time became a fund-raising event subsidising live arts. Rescued from this role by the intervention of the New Zealand Federation of Film Societies in 1984, the AIFF achieved an audience in excess of 100,000 for the first time in 2005. In 2019, it achieved a record audience of over 112,000. The year 2000 marked the AIFF's return to the refurbished Civic Theatre, an atmospheric theatre built in 1929.

=== Wellington ===
The Wellington Film Festival (WFF) was inaugurated by Lindsay Shelton and the Wellington Film Society with seven films in 1972. Thirty years later, it showed over 150 programmes to audiences in excess of 71,000. In 2018, it exceeded 84,000 admits. The main venue is the Embassy Theatre, and the WFF and NZIFF have played a major role in the theatre's rehabilitation and continuing refurbishment.

=== Dunedin and Christchurch ===
Founded in 1977, the Dunedin manifestation of the Festival presented a highlights package of 75 features, plus short films, at the Regent Theatre. Founded along with the Dunedin event in 1977, the Christchurch Festival presented substantially the same programme.

=== Other regions ===
Often a selection of festival titles traveled around New Zealand, making the NZIFF unique on the world film-festival stage. Provincial centres covered by the festival included Gore, Hamilton, Hawke's Bay, Masterton, New Plymouth, Palmerston North, Tauranga and Timaru.

== The New Zealand Film Festival Trust ==
The New Zealand Film Festival Trust, which runs the NZIFF, is a registered charitable entity under the Charities Act 2005, registration number CC23151. The NZ Film Festival Trust is governed by a board of trustees. The board currently consists of Catherine Fitzgerald, Chris Hormann, Tearepa Kahi, Robin Laing, Andrew Langridge, Toby Manhire, and is chaired by Kaine Thompson with Sharon Menzies as deputy.

== See also ==
- List of film festivals in Oceania
