= The Irrefutable Truth about Demons =

The Irrefutable Truth About Demons
- Release poster
- Directed by: Glenn Standring
- Written by: Glenn Standring
- Produced by: Dave Gibson; Chris Tyson
- Starring: Karl Urban; Katie Wolfe; Jonathon Hendry; Sally Stockwell
- Cinematography: Simon Baumfield
- Edited by: Paul Sutorius
- Music by: Victoria Kelly; Joost Langeveld
- Distributed by: New Zealand Film Commission; First Look International
- Release date: May 2000 (Cannes Film Market)
- Running time: 90 minutes
- Country: New Zealand
- Language: English

The Irrefutable Truth about Demons is a New Zealand horror film released in 2000. It was directed by Glenn Standring and stars Karl Urban, Katie Wolfe, and Jonathon Hendry.

The film's UK DVD title is The Truth About Demons.

== Plot ==
Haughty anthropology professor Harry Ballard (Karl Urban) receives a sinister videotape showing a cult called the Black Lodge ranting about a demonic plot. As it turns out, Harry's brother, Richard, killed himself a few months earlier under mysterious circumstances, possibly related to this cult; in any event, the loss has been preying on Harry's mind, sending his relationship with his girlfriend (Sally Stockwell) into a tailspin. Meanwhile, a seemingly schizophrenic young woman named Benny (Katie Wolfe), who has a penchant for lighting sparklers in alleyways for no good reason, follows Harry around and snatches him from the jaws of doom after he falls into the cult's hands. The devilish leader, Le Valliant (Jonathan Hendry), apparently has big plans in store for Harry, and soon the protagonist's grip on reality slips as the cult targets him for an upcoming ritual.

== Release ==
The Irrefutable Truth about Demons released in 2000 and was screened at multiple film festivals that included Cannes.

== Critical reception ==
AllMovie gave the film a positive review, calling it "a clever, gleefully ludicrous flick". Variety also reviewed the movie upon its release, stating that "While the generic plot doesn't bear close examination and the dialogue is not always Pulitzer material, writer-director Glenn Standring conjures a creepy, brooding atmosphere and enough thrills to keep young horror enthusiasts glued." Russell Baillie of The New Zealand Herald was more critical, rating it two stars. Poonam Khanna of Exclaim! was also critical, calling it "just plain bad" and criticising the acting and writing.

Ryan Larson reviewed the film for Bloody Disgusting in 2020, noting that it was "so incredibly *millennium*" and that it was "a fun flashback into the era; every subordinate in the cult looks primed and ready to be dancing to Nine Inch Nails in an old goth club, and so many rooms are candle lit with writing on the walls you can’t help but smile."
