= The Vintner's Luck =

1998 novel by Elizabeth Knox

- Cover of first edition (Victoria University Press)
- Author: Elizabeth Knox
- Language: English
- Genre: Fantasy, romance
- Set in: Burgundy, France in the 19th century
- Publisher: Victoria University Press (NZ), Chatto & Windus and Vintage Books (UK), Farrar, Straus and Giroux and Picador (US)
- Publication date: 1998
- Publication place: New Zealand
- Pages: 241
- Awards: Deutz Medal for Fiction at the Montana New Zealand Book Awards
- ISBN: 9780864733429 (1st edition, Victoria University Press)
- Followed by: The Angel's Cut

The Vintner's Luck is a romantic fantasy novel by New Zealand author Elizabeth Knox, first published in 1998. It was her fourth full-length novel, and her first book published outside New Zealand. The novel charts the relationship between a French winemaker (the vintner of the title), Sobran Jodeau, and an angel, Xas, who first visits Jodeau on a midsummer's eve in 1808, when he is 18 years old, and again each year on the same day. The novel won several prestigious awards including the Deutz Medal for Fiction at the 1999 Montana New Zealand Book Awards and the inaugural Tasmania Pacific Region Prize for best novel. It was adapted into a 2009 film.

== Plot ==
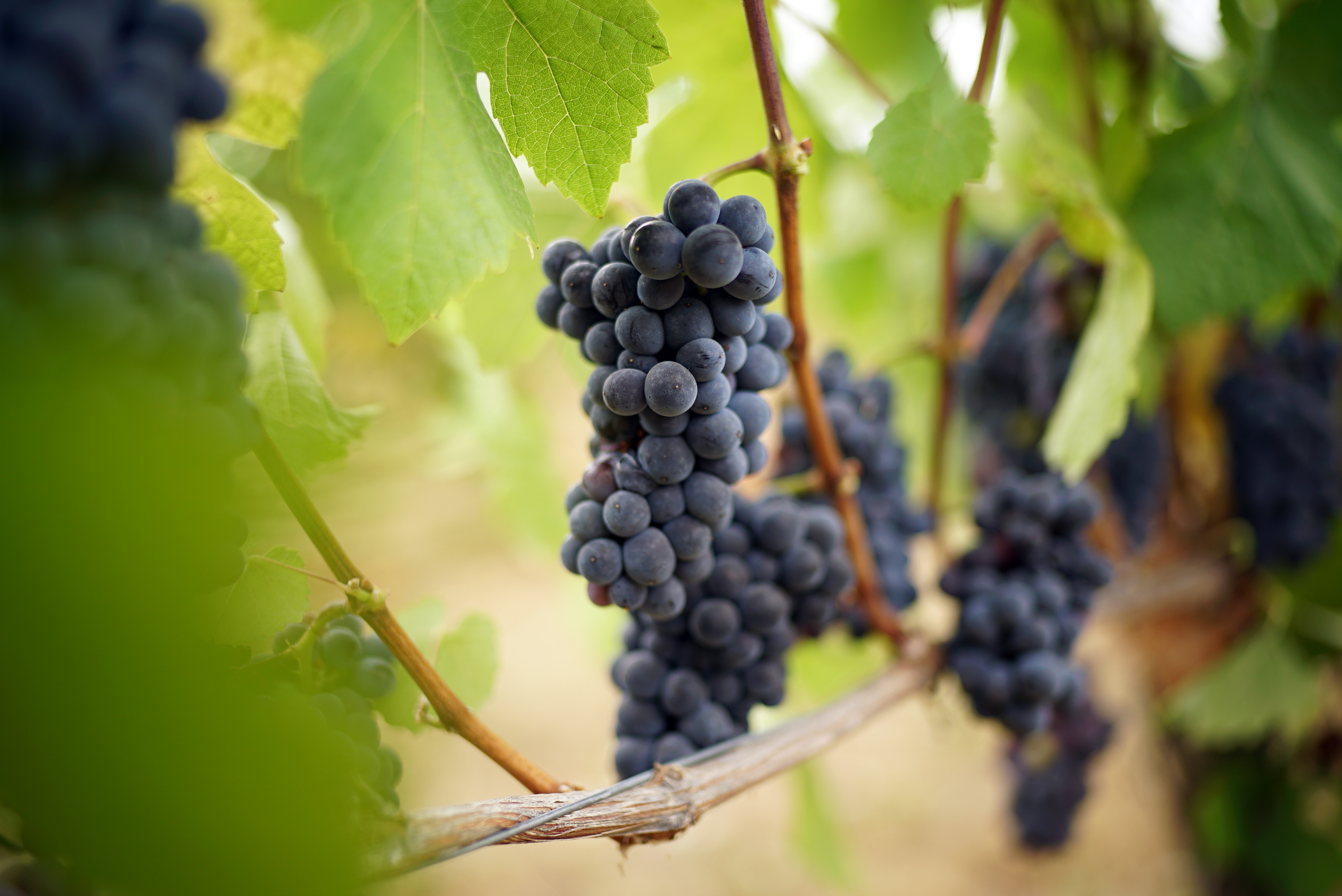
Pinot noir grapes – the variety of Sobran and Céleste's nuptial wine, which Sobran shared with Xas at their second meeting

The novel chronicles the life of a peasant winemaker, Sobran Jodeau, and his long and enduring relationship with the angel Xas over 55 years. It opens with 18-year-old Jodeau, drunk and unhappy in love, on the ridge of the sloping hills of his family's vineyard in Burgundy. Jodeau stumbles upon what he initially thinks is a statue, but which turns out to be the angel Xas. Xas is described as physically beautiful, and appearing as a young man with white wings and whiter skin, smelling of snow. Jodeau believes that Xas is his guardian angel, and Xas promises to toast his marriage the following year.

Xas thereafter visits Jodeau in the same place, once a year, with each annual visit constituting a chapter of the book, and their relationship develops. Each chapter title bears the year and the name of a different stage in the wine-making process. The first chapter is titled "1808 Vin Bourru (new wine)". The second chapter, "1809 Vin de coucher (nuptial wine)", records Jodeau's marriage to Céleste against parental opposition, and the birth of their daughter. As time goes on, Jodeau joins the French army and travels to Moscow with his best friend Baptiste Kalmann as part of the Napoleonic Wars, inherits the family vineyards after his father's death and becomes prosperous. At each annual visit he and Xas discuss Jodeau's life and family, and events in the village (including the murder of two local girls), and Xas gives Jodeau brief details about the afterlife and of his relationship with God and Lucifer; he appears to embody a mysterious treaty between the two.

Over time, Jodeau falls in love with Xas, but after learning that Xas is a fallen angel, feels conflicted. He develops a closer relationship with Aurora de Valday, the widowed niece of a local nobleman, and she learns of his relationship with Xas. One visit Xas is wounded by Lucifer, and "given" to Jodeau.

The final meeting between Jodeau and Xas is in the chapter "1863 Vinifie (to turn into wine)". An epilogue, from the perspective of the immortal Xas, is set in 1997.

== Background and publication ==
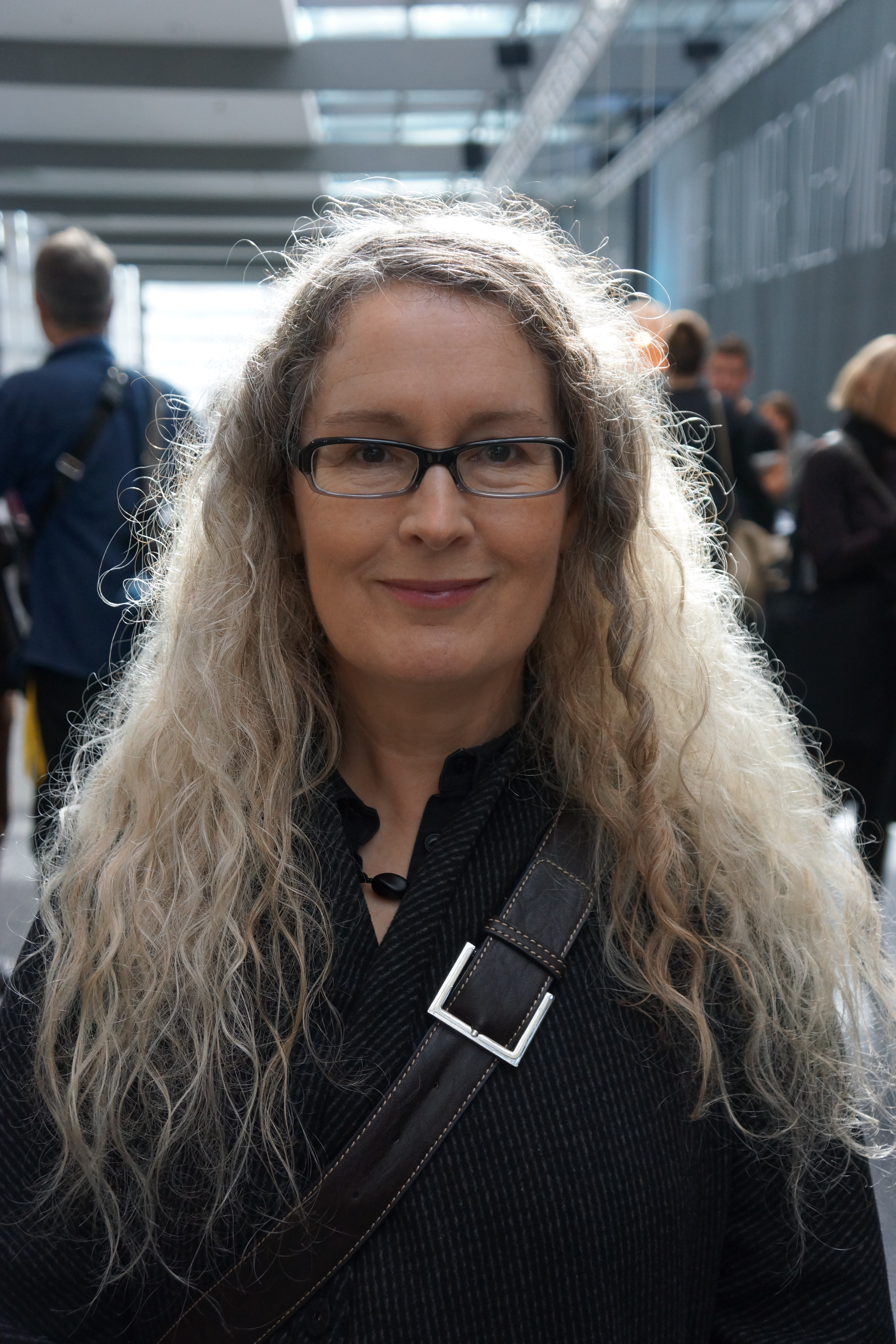
Author Elizabeth Knox, 2012

In the mid 1990s Knox was working part-time and parenting, and felt she had little time to sit down and think about a new novel. She began writing after having a fever dream while ill with pneumonia, in which an angel began to tell her "the story of the most important relationship in his life, which was the story of his friendship with a French winemaker last century". She described it as being like a film. On waking, she wrote the novel's first 100 pages. Although Knox's first few novels had been critically well-received, they had not found commercial success; she has said that on reading over what she had written, she knew it would be a bestseller.

Knox had never been to Burgundy nor had any experience with the wine-making process. In order to write the book, she researched wine-making in New Zealand and Burgundy, as well as historical wine-making. She found minor details, such as the exact usage of steam engines used to pump out mines, hardest to research. She has said, however, that she was more concerned with creativity than research, particularly given that the book features an angel: "All I had to do was make it seem real." She also invented the internal theology for the novel, including the nature of heaven and hell and of angels. She described herself as a "very Christian atheist", who "thinks about religion and human beings' place in the universe". The fictional Clos Jodeau, where much of the book takes place, is described in the book as being on a hill near real-life Aluze, in Burgundy, and near the river Saône.

The novel was first published in New Zealand by Victoria University Press in 1998. It was published in the United States by Farrar, Straus and Giroux and in the United Kingdom by Chatto & Windus, in 1999, followed by Vintage Books in 2000. Victoria University Press published a limited edition hardback edition in 2008 to celebrate the novel's tenth anniversary and a "VUP Classic" edition in 2019. It has been published in German, Dutch, Norwegian, Spanish, French, Hebrew, Italian and Korean. Although the word "vintner" generally means wine merchant, Knox chose the title because Californian winemakers call themselves vintners. She was aware that vigneron (French for winemaker) would have been the correct term, but felt that "The Vigneron's Luck" would have been "a mouthful".

At the time of its publication, it was unusual for New Zealand fiction to be set outside of New Zealand and to involve elements of magical realism and fantasy. Knox has said she has always wanted to expand the meaning of New Zealand literature, and that she decided she "could just widen the brief of what a New Zealand writer might be". Knox described the novel's genre as fantasy, rather than magical realism. She has also said that she sees her fantasy work as "a fantastic naturalism, a fantastic element in a world that is very real, and so the fantastic things have to be very real too".

== Reception ==
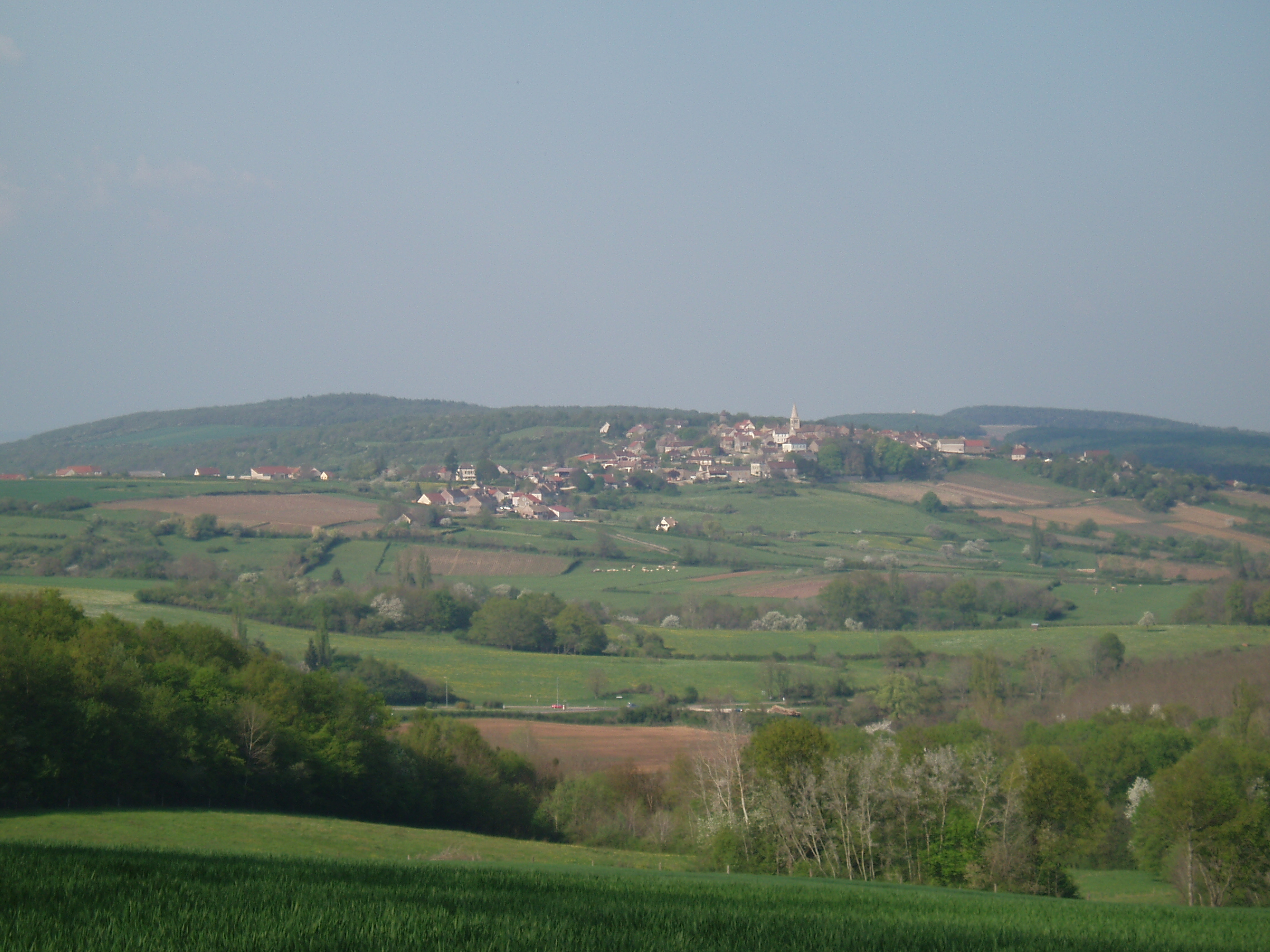
A view of Aluze, the real life village nearest to the fictional Clos Jodeau, from a nearby hillside

The Vintner's Luck won Knox widespread critical acclaim, and it raised her profile within New Zealand and overseas. The novel sold very well in New Zealand, Australia and Britain (where it featured on The Guardian's bestseller list for three weeks). In New Zealand it sold over 60,000 copies, and in 2018, readers of The Spinoff voted it to be the best New Zealand novel of the last 50 years.

The book received mixed reviews in the United States, with critics agreeing that the book had "flashes of brilliance" but disagreeing about its consistency, according to Slate's Eliza Truitt. Several reviews praised Knox's prose style but were less positive about the human characters in the book. Richard Bernstein in The New York Times praised the book's opening for its "spare stylish precision" and said that "Ms. Knox displays considerable talent throughout", but felt that the book lost momentum, concluding that "Ms. Knox clearly can fabricate a strange tale, but in this one she has not succeeded in exploiting the interesting possibilities present at the beginning". In the LA Times, Richard Eder wrote that "The Vintner's Luck, for all its virtues, has a disconcerting hollowness to it" and identified the problem as an inherent emptiness in the concept of angels. On the other hand, he was impressed by her depiction of Xas: "she never falls into the trap of making him human. Xas is always the Other, and the author exquisitely imagines him that way".

Nina Auerbach, writing in The New York Times Book Review two months after Bernstein's review, said that "Xas is one of the best angels since William Blake's" and that even sceptics would be convinced "since Knox creates so vivid a realm for him, at once orthodox and iconoclastic, mysterious and translucent." However, Auerbach found the human characters comparatively forgettable, writing: "Her original, often astonishingly vivid novel would have been better still if its earth were as credible as its heaven and hell". Kirkus Reviews described the book as a "wonderfully imaginative tale"; although "arguably overplotted", Knox's "ferocious display of inventive power redeems and enlivens even the book's more extravagant convolutions". The conclusion was that the novel was "one-of-a-kind". Publishers Weekly found the structure, plot twists and alternative universe of the novel intriguing, but ultimately felt that readers would be left "impressed but not totally enthusiastic". The Guardian's Isobel Montgomery praised the "angelic writing and inspired structure", but concluded that "the divine and the everyday do not quite mesh into a satisfying whole".

In The Independent, James Urquhart was positive, summing up his review in this way: "Beautifully written, The Vintner's Luck possesses a complex bouquet of conceits and ideas but it is the simplicity of Elizabeth Knox's writing that in the end draws out the savour of human experience and compassion." Megan Harlan in Entertainment Weekly gave the novel an A− grade, concluding: "Daringly exploring the spiritual worth of sensual pleasure, New Zealand writer Elizabeth Knox’s imaginative, imagistic tale soars." Actress Emma Thompson read The Vintner's Luck while preparing to play an angel in Mike Nichols' miniseries Angels of America and chose it as one of her favourite books for O, The Oprah Magazine in 2003, saying it was "the best story I've read in the past few years".

=== Awards ===
The Vintner's Luck won three awards at the 1999 Montana New Zealand Book Awards: the Deutz Medal for Fiction (New Zealand's most prestigious literary prize), the Readers' Choice award, and the Booksellers' Choice award. The judging panel said it was "an astonishing feat of imaginative story-telling". In the same year it was longlisted for the prestigious Orange Prize for Fiction (now the Women's Prize for Fiction). In 2002 it received the inaugural A$40,000 Tasmania Pacific Region Prize, then Australasia's richest literary prize.

In 2000, not long after the publication of The Vintner's Luck, Knox received one of the five inaugural Arts Foundation of New Zealand Laureate Awards. Bill Manhire, one of the members of the awarding panel, related this to the book, saying that "Knox's achievement is already considerable with the break-through success of The Vintner's Luck" and that the judging panel believed "she is about to become a major international writer".

== Sequel ==
Knox had planned to write a sequel after finishing the novel, but after it became a bestseller, felt she "couldn't possibly do that again". She only felt sufficiently confident to tackle the sequel after the success of her Dreamhunter Duet young-adult novels in 2005 and 2007. In 2009, after a difficult year for her family, she said: "I know it's taking a long time but the living I do in between each book, and lessons I learn, I apply to Xas in learning how to be human. And there's been a lot of learning this year."

The sequel, The Angel's Cut, was published in 2009. The story follows the tale of Xas after the events of the first book and is set in 1930s Hollywood. Jose Borghino, writing for News.com.au, said that like the first book, it "contemplates the big questions", and that "it's the passion, exuberance and irrational joy of being human that Xas (and Knox) plump for every time". Emma Hagestadt in The Independent said "Knox's evocation of Thirties California is dreamy, and her characters, interestingly warped". At the time Knox said that she was intending to write a third book in the series, The Angel's Reserve, set in contemporary times.

== Adaptation ==
The development of a film adaptation of the novel was announced in 2003, to be directed and co-written by New Zealand director Niki Caro. Caro was at the time promoting her successful film Whale Rider; having just learned that the novel's option was available for purchase, she visited Knox's home doorstep with flowers and suggested that she purchase the option. At that time, Knox said she was confident Caro would do the novel justice.

In 2009 the adaptation was released, under the title The Vintner's Luck. It was almost universally panned at the 34th Annual Toronto International Film Festival. Knox was disappointed at the direction the movie took as she felt Caro "took out what the book was actually about", referring to the romantic relationship between Sobran and Xas which was a core aspect of the novel. Her sister Sara, who is gay, was also upset about the film version. After Knox's bad experience with the film, she pulled out of a potential film contract with New Zealand filmmaker Jonathan King for her young adult fantasy series, The Dreamhunter Duet.

In a 2016 article for the Academy of New Zealand Literature, David Larsen discussed the relationship of the film to the novel. He noted that the screenplay opened with the main character, Sobran Jodeau, on his deathbed, and frames the story as a flashback. This approach, Larsen suggested, distorts the story into a single linear quest for the great wine that Jodeau will drink before he dies. He also criticised Caro's approach to the sexual relationships in the film, particularly that between Xas and Sobran: "In the book this is either the great love of Sobran’s life, or one of them; the fact that the answer could be given either way tells you something about the nuanced complexity of the writing." In the film Xas asks Sobran to cut off his wings, rather than them being forcibly removed by Lucifer. Larsen noted that this appeared to have homophobic subtext but that this may have been due to the difficulties in the film's production process.
