= Peschardt's People =

- Genre: Documentary
- Presented by: Michael Peschardt
- Original language: English

Original release
- Network: BBC World
- Release: 1 April 2006 – present

Peschardt's People is a documentary television series, hosted by Michael Peschardt, that premiered on BBC World on 1 April 2006. In the series, Peschardt interviews famous and not so famous personalities from the Asia-Pacific region. In order to be featured in the series, Peschardt has said that his subjects "must have something extraordinary about their lives". The basic format of the show is that Peschardt's guests show him some of the places that are important to them: their favourite cities, their favourite beaches, their favourite restaurants, where they work, where they grew up, where they live. Each episode is filmed entirely on location. Although Peschardt has stated that he does not interview politicians, he later interviewed former Member of Parliament Georgina Beyer. More than 150 interviews have been broadcast since its launch.

The programme is broadcast to over 200 countries on the BBC footprint, reaching every corner of the globe. It is repeated a number of times to ensure the programme is aired in peak-time in all major markets.

== Episodes ==
In the first thirteen-part series the interviewees include New Zealand actor Sam Neill, Australian businesswoman Janet Holmes à Court, musician Vanessa-Mae, Bollywood actress Preity Zinta, Australian author Doris Pilkington Garimara, Indian writer Shobhaa De, gold prospector Cranston Edwards, Thai businessman Sompan Charumilinda, plastic surgeon Fiona Wood, Indian businessman Vijay Mallya, Thai businesswoman Pannin Kitiparaporn, and Australian professional basketball player Luc Longley.

A second series began on 7 April 2007, with interviews of mountaineer Edmund Hillary, businessman N. R. Narayana Murthy, actor Naseeruddin Shah, actress Shabana Azmi, and actor Amitabh Bachchan.

In 2009, a new series included interviews with surgeon Chris O'Brien, designer Kim Young Se, politician Georgina Beyer, filmmaker Niki Caro, athlete Sun Ji Hai, writer Lijia Zhang, fashion designer Suzie Moncrieff, and golfer Greg Norman.

Other interviews have been with Governor General Quentin Bryce, actor Robert De Niro, the Royal Family of Bahrain, the King and Queen of Bollywood Amitabh Bachchan and Aishwarya Rai, Australian actress Toni Collette, English comedian Ben Elton, former Australian cricketer Dennis Lillee, Indian actress Shilpa Shetty, Japanese restaurateur Nobu, author Diane Wei Liang, singer Olivia Newton-John, Singaporean actress Fann Wong, golfer Lam Chih Bing, former tennis player Rod Laver, and Australian rugby league player Clint Newton.
