= The Vintner's Luck (film) =

2009 film by Niki Caro

- Theatrical release poster
- Directed by: Niki Caro
- Written by: Niki Caro; Joan Scheckel
- Based on: The Vintner's Luck by Elizabeth Knox
- Produced by: Ludi Boeken; Pascal Judelewicz; Niki Caro; Robin Laing; Laurie Parker
- Starring: Jérémie Renier; Vera Farmiga; Gaspard Ulliel; Keisha Castle-Hughes
- Cinematography: Denis Lenoir
- Edited by: David Coulson
- Music by: Antônio Pinto
- Production companies: Acajou Films; Kortex Cinema; Ascension Films
- Release dates: September 12, 2009 (Toronto); November 12, 2009 (New Zealand)
- Running time: 121 minutes
- Countries: France; Belgium; New Zealand; Sweden; Japan
- Language: English
- Budget: €8.5 million

The Vintner's Luck is a 2009 internationally co-produced romantic drama film co-written and directed by Niki Caro. It is loosely based on the 1998 novel by Elizabeth Knox. The film had its international premiere at the Toronto International Film Festival on 12 September 2009.

The film stars Jérémie Renier, Vera Farmiga, Gaspard Ulliel, and Keisha Castle-Hughes. The film marked the second time Caro worked with Castle-Hughes, a New Zealand actress and Academy Award nominee.

== Plot ==
The film is the story of Sobran Jodeau (Jérémie Renier), an ambitious young peasant winemaker, and the three loves of his life – his beautiful wife Celeste (Keisha Castle-Hughes), the proudly intellectual baroness Aurora de Valday (Vera Farmiga), and Xas (Gaspard Ulliel), an angel who strikes up an unlikely but enduring friendship that borders on eroticism with him.

Under Xas' guidance, Sobran is forced to fathom the nature of love and belief and in the process grapples with the sensual, the sacred and the profane – in pursuit of the perfect vintage.

== Cast ==
- Jérémie Renier as Sobran Jodeau
- Vera Farmiga as Aurora de Valday
- Gaspard Ulliel as Xas, The Vintner's Luck
- Keisha Castle-Hughes as Celeste
- Vania Vilers as Jodeau Senior
- Eric Godon as Father Lesy
- Patrice Valota as Comte de Vully
- Jean-Louis Sbille as Henri
- Lizzie Brocheré as Sabine

== Production ==
The film was directed by Niki Caro and co-written by Caro and Joan Scheckel. The film is based on the novel The Vintner's Luck by Elizabeth Knox. Its development was announced in 2003, while Caro was promoting her previous film Whale Rider; Caro had learned that the novel's option was available for purchase and visited Knox's home doorstep with flowers. At that time, Knox said she was confident Caro would do the novel justice.

However, after its release Knox was disappointed at the direction taken by the film. She felt Caro "took out what the book was actually about", referring to the romantic homosexual relationship between Sobran and Xas, which was a core aspect of the novel and was very noticeably toned down in the film version, though it still hinted at it. Knox said that she "laid in bed and cried for days" after being shocked and upset by how much it departed from her story.

The Vintner's Luck was filmed in New Zealand, at Studio West in West Auckland.

== Release ==
The film premiered at the Toronto International Film Festival on 12 September 2009. It was later released in New Zealand on 12 November 2009, Australia on 14 January 2010, and Japan on 23 October 2010. In the United States, the film opened at the Sedona Film Festival on 23 February 2011. It was released to French cinemas on 25 January 2012. The film was released on DVD in the UK on 20 September 2010, in Germany on 16 March 2012, and in the United States on 17 April 2012.

== Reception ==
=== Critical response ===
The film has received polarized responses since the Toronto Film Festival. Positive reviews included Paul Fischer of Dark Horizons who said: "A film about humanity and spirituality, Caro directs this film with an exquisite sense of detail. Gorgeous in all facets of visual detail, The Vintner's Luck is also a fascinating romantic melodrama, and at its core, comprises a cast that is spot on"; and Kate Rodger of 3 News who said, "For me, The Vintner's Luck was a gorgeous collection of imagery, sound and movement, with moments of intoxicating beauty." Other reviewers criticised the film. Peter Brunette of The Hollywood Reporter wrote, "It's difficult to believe that the same director who made the simple and affecting Whale Rider in 2002 is responsible for The Vintner's Luck, an overblown work of amazing silliness." Justin Chang for Variety wrote, "Caro never finds the emotional pulse of the story" in an adaptation he described as "drearily literal-minded". However, he praised the "lyrical widescreen cinematography."

In a 2016 article for the Academy of New Zealand Literature, David Larsen discussed the relationship of the film to the novel. He notes that there were "so many problems with this film at a basic craft level that it’s hard to winnow out a sense of exactly what went wrong in its production process". He highlights Caro's treatment of the relationship between Sobran and Xas, which in the book is one of the most important romantic relationships of Sobran's life. Another departure he highlights is that in the film Xas asks Sobran to cut off his wings, rather than them being forcibly removed by Lucifer. Larsen noted that this appears to have homophobic subtext but thought perhaps it was "just the unfortunate cumulative side effect of an unhappy production process".

=== Accolades ===
| Year | Award | Recipient(s) | Category | Result |
|---|---|---|---|---|
| 2010 | New Zealand Film & TV Awards | Vera Farmiga | Best Lead Actress in a Feature Film | Won |
| 2010 | New Zealand Film & TV Awards | Grant Major | Best Production Design in a Feature Film | Won |
| 2010 | New Zealand Film & TV Awards | Beatrix Pasztor | Best Costume Design in a Feature Film | Won |
| 2010 | New Zealand Film & TV Awards | Denis Lenoir | Best Cinematography | Nominated |
| 2010 | New Zealand Film & TV Awards | Keisha Castle-Hughes | Best Supporting Actress in a Feature Film | Nominated |
| 2011 | Houston International Film Festival | Niki Caro | Gold Remi Best Directing | Won |
| 2011 | Houston International Film Festival | The Vintner's Luck | Special Jury Award – Best Foreign Film | Won |
| 2011 | Sedona International Film Festival | The Vintner's Luck | Best Period Film | Won |

== See also ==
- List of films about angels
