= Elizabeth Knox =

New Zealand writer

Elizabeth Knox CNZM
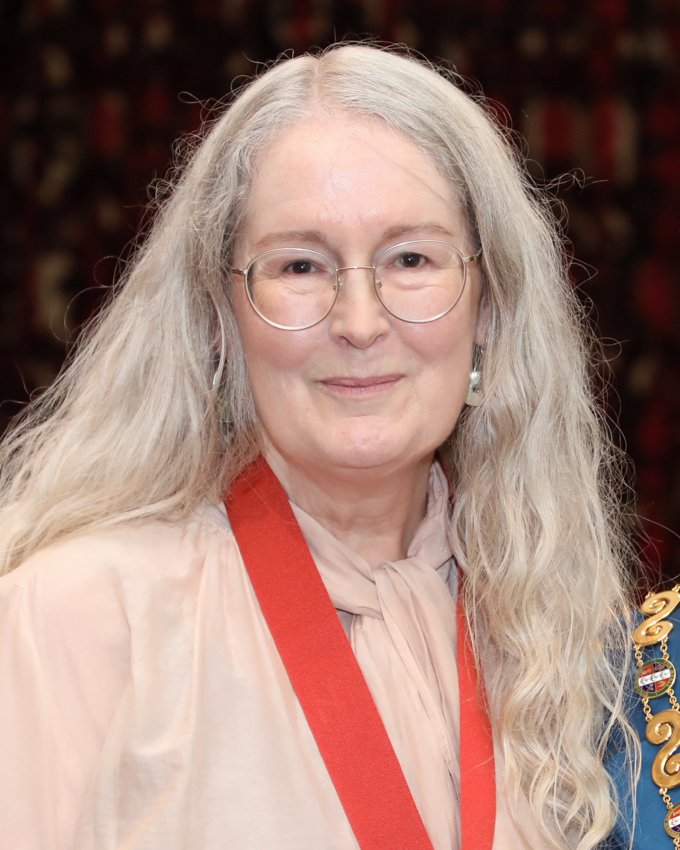
- Knox in 2021
- Born: 15 February 1959 (age 67); Wellington, New Zealand
- Occupation: Writer
- Spouse: Fergus Barrowman (m. 1989)
- Children: 1
- Writing career
- Period: 1987–
- Notable work: The Vintner's Luck (1998)
- Website: www.elizabethknox.com

Elizabeth Fiona Knox CNZM (born 15 February 1959) is a New Zealand writer. She has authored several novels for both adults and teenagers, autobiographical novellas, and a collection of essays. One of her best-known works is The Vintner's Luck (1998), which won several awards, has been published in ten languages, and was made into a film of the same name by Niki Caro in 2009. Knox is also known for her young adult literary fantasy series, Dreamhunter Duet. Other notable works include Mortal Fire and Wake, both published in 2013, and The Absolute Book, published in 2019.

== Early life ==
Knox was born in Wellington, New Zealand. She and her two sisters were raised by atheist parents in a household where religion was often debated. They spent their childhood living in various small suburbs of Wellington, including Pomare, Wadestown, Waikanae and Paremata. She went to high school at Tawa College, and later published a trilogy of novellas that were influenced by her childhood experiences of living in and around Wellington.

Knox enjoyed inventing stories as a child, and was an avid reader, but had difficulties with writing because she was slightly dyslexic. When she was eleven she created an oral narrative history with her younger sister Sara and its characters and plot evolved based on their input along with the input of their older sister and a friend. It became an elaborate imaginary world with many characters, intricate plot lines, and involvements. When she was sixteen, Knox's father overheard a discussion regarding the consequences of a secret treaty set in their imaginary world and remarked that he hoped they were writing this down. Following this, they all tried "writing stories about, letters between, and poems by their characters" and Knox enjoyed it so much that she decided she would like to be a writer.

== Career ==
=== Early career: 1983–1997 ===
In 1983, when Knox was 24, she started a degree in English Literature at Victoria University of Wellington. A year later, she started work on After Z-Hour in Bill Manhire's Original Composition course at Victoria. The novel is about the ghost of a World War I soldier, and it was inspired by a childhood memory; at age eleven Knox fell from a walnut tree on Anzac Day, and while in the hospital she overheard a conversation between an older man and her father about Passchendaele and life on the Salient in 1917. Bill Manhire encouraged her to write her novel, and told her he would be more interested in seeing her complete it, than her degree. After Z-Hour was published in 1987 by Victoria University Press, and Knox graduated from Victoria University of Wellington the same year. She was also awarded the ICI Young Writers Bursary award that year.

In 1988 Knox, Fergus Barrowman, Nigel Cox, and Damien Wilkins, with the help of Bill Manhire, Alan Preston and Andrew Mason, co-founded the literary journal Sport. Knox was one of its editors and has been a frequent contributor to the magazine.

Her second and third novels, Treasure (1992) and Glamour and the Sea (1996), were both set in Wellington; the former was about a religious community while the latter was a mystery novel set in the 1940s. Alongside these novels, Knox also wrote a trilogy of novellas based on her own experiences growing up in Wellington: Paremata (1989), Pomare (1994), and Tawa (1998), later published in the compilation The High Jump: A New Zealand Childhood (2000). She was the recipient of the Victoria University of Wellington Writing Fellowship in 1997.

=== The Vintner's Luck and other work: 1998–2010 ===
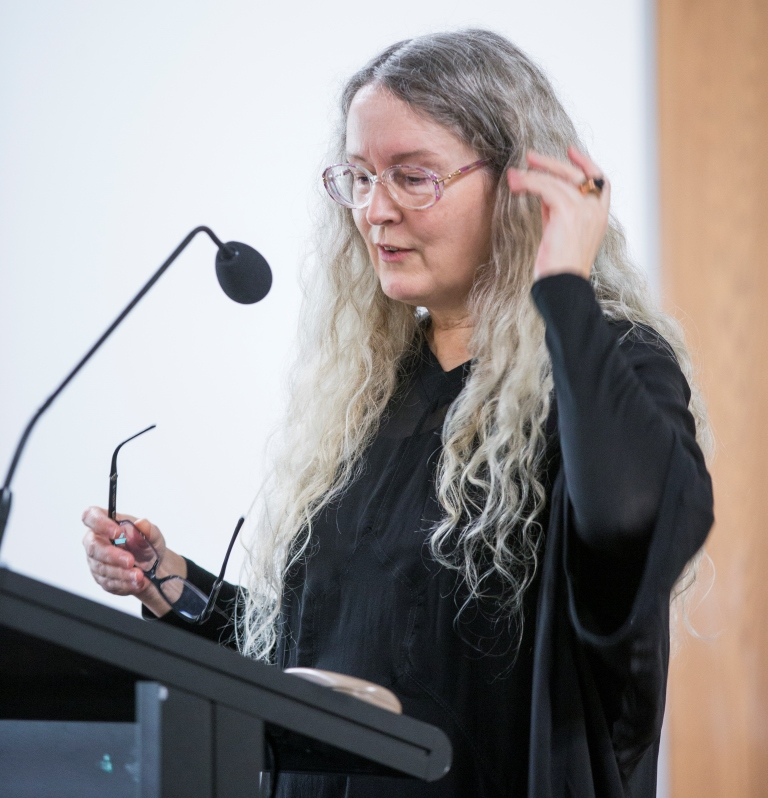
Knox at the 2014 WORD Christchurch Festival

Knox's fourth full-length novel, The Vintner's Luck, was published in 1998, and was her first book to be published outside New Zealand. It chronicles the life of a peasant winemaker, Sobran Jodeau, and his relationship with the fallen angel Xas. The novel is set in 19th-century Burgundy, France, and spans 55 years. It was inspired by a feverish dream experienced by Knox when she had pneumonia. The Vintner's Luck won Knox widespread critical acclaim and numerous awards, and it raised her profile within New Zealand and overseas. It sold over 60,000 copies in New Zealand alone and in 2018, readers of The Spinoff voted it as the best New Zealand novel of the last 50 years.

After the success of The Vintner's Luck, and spending part of 1999 in Menton, France as the recipient of the Meridian Energy Katherine Mansfield Memorial Fellowship, three novels by Knox were published in quick succession: Black Oxen (2001), Billie's Kiss (2002), and Daylight (2003). Daylight, a novel about vampires created by a virus, received praise from reviewers and did well overseas. Academic Erin Mercer notes that the novel reflects international Gothic and supernatural literary traditions as well as New Zealand fiction's more realistic approach.

In 2002, Knox was appointed an Officer of the New Zealand Order of Merit in the 2002 Queen's Birthday and Golden Jubilee Honours, for services to literature.

Knox's first young adult books, Dreamhunter and Dreamquake, were published in 2005 and 2007 respectively, as the Dreamhunter Duet series. Jolisa Gracewood, reviewing Dreamquake, described the book as a "Mansfield-meets-Mahy fantasy" and praised Knox for her audacious imagination and ingeniously constructed tales. In 2008, she published a collection of non-fiction, The Love School: Personal Essays, which was shortlisted in the 2009 Montana New Zealand Book Awards. Since 2013 a quotation from The Love School has been featured on a concrete plaque forming part of the Wellington Writers Walk, a series of quotations installed along the Wellington waterfront.

In 2009 the film adaptation of The Vintner's Luck directed and co-written by Niki Caro was released. The film was almost universally panned at the 34th Annual Toronto International Film Festival. Knox was disappointed at the direction the movie took as she felt Caro "took out what the book was actually about", referring to the romantic relationship between Sobran and Xas which was a core aspect of the novel. Her sister Sara, who is gay, was also upset about the film version. Knox's bad experience with the film made her pull out of a potential film contract with New Zealand filmmaker Jonathan King for her young adult fantasy series, The Dreamhunter Duet.

That same year, Knox published The Angel's Cut, a sequel to The Vintner's Luck. The story follows the tale of Xas after the events of the first book and is set in 1930s Hollywood. At the time she said that she was intending to write a third book in the series, The Angel's Reserve, set in contemporary times, but as of 2020 it has not yet been published.

=== Later career ===
In 2013, Mortal Fire was published, a young adult novel described by Paula Green as "a modern fairy story without fairies, full of breathtaking magic and visual detail", and Wake, a horror novel for adults. The Guardian said in its review: "Knox keeps the monster off stage and examines the psychological consequences of its depredations on the survivors, subverting the norms of the horror genre and thus making the ambiguous finale all the more startling." The publication of both books in the same year caused some confusion, with New Zealand bookstore Whitcoulls inadvertently shelving Wake in the children's section and listing it as a "great gift for kids".

Since 2016, Knox has taught a world-building writing workshop at Victoria University.

In 2019, The Absolute Book was published, a fantasy novel that won critical acclaim both in New Zealand and overseas. The book attracted particular attention after a January 2020 book review by Slate writer Dan Kois headlined "This New Zealand Fantasy Masterpiece Needs to Be Published in America, Like, Now". The book was subsequently acquired by overseas publishers. It was published in the US and Canada in February 2021, and in the UK in March 2021. Kirkus Reviews wrote: "This darkly luminous fantasy reads like a mystery, thoroughly and wonderfully transporting readers to another world." The Times described the novel as "bursting with imagination" and "a bewitching, frustrating, strange and perverse novel". Nina Allan, reviewing the novel for The Guardian, said it "has the feel of an instant classic" and "is everything fantasy should be: original, magical, well read". She praised the diverse characters and the book's "genuine feeling of jeopardy". It was listed as one of the best science fiction and fantasy books of 2021 by The New York Times.

In June 2020, Knox was promoted to Companion of the New Zealand Order of Merit, for services to literature, in the 2020 Queen's Birthday Honours. She said that on receiving the award her first thought was that her parents would have been amused, given her lack of writing ability as a child.

In 2025, Knox published the young adult novel Kings of this World, set in the same world as the Dreamhunter Duet novels. In 2026, she published a memoir, Night, Ma, about a difficult period in her life between 2008 and 2012 when she and her family experienced a number of challenges. The Spinoff called it "profoundly moving": "It is nothing less than the best of literature about the worst of times."

== Honours and awards ==
=== Fellowships and honours ===
- Writer in Residence at Victoria University of Wellington in 1997
- Recipient of Meridian Energy Katherine Mansfield Memorial Fellowship, 1999, to enable an NZ author to work in Menton, France
- Recipient of Arts Foundation of New Zealand Laureate Award in 2000
- Appointed an Officer of the New Zealand Order of Merit in the 2002 Queen's Birthday and Golden Jubilee Honours, for services to literature
- Recipient of Creative New Zealand Michael King Writer's Fellowship in 2014
- Recipient of Prime Minister's Award for Literary Achievement in Fiction, 2019
- Awarded an honorary Doctorate of Literature from Victoria University of Wellington in 2020.
- Promoted to Companion of the New Zealand Order of Merit in the 2020 Queen's Birthday Honours, for services to literature

=== Prizes for individual books ===
- Treasure short-listed for New Zealand Book Award for Fiction 1993
- The Vintner′s Luck winner of 1999 Deutz Medal for Fiction at the New Zealand Book Awards
- The Vintner's Luck winner of 1999 Reader's Choice Award at the New Zealand Book Awards
- The Vintner's Luck winner of 1999 Booksellers' Choice Award at the New Zealand Book Awards
- The Vintner's Luck long-listed for 1999 Orange Prize for Fiction
- The Vintner's Luck winner of 2001 Tasmania Pacific Region Prize
- Billie's Kiss runner-up of 2002 Deutz Medal for Fiction at the New Zealand Book Awards
- Daylight short-listed for Best Book in the South Pacific & South East Asian Region, for 2004 Commonwealth Writers Prize
- Dreamhunter short-listed for the Deutz Medal for Fiction at the 2006 New Zealand Book Awards
- Dreamhunter winner of 2006 Esther Glen Award
- Dreamhunter chosen for a White Raven Award by the International Youth Library in 2006
- Dreamhunter winner of 2007 ALA Best Books For Young Adults award
- Dreamquake Honor Book of 2008 Michael L. Printz Award
- Dreamquake winner of 2008 ALA Best Books For Young Adults award
- The Invisible Road winner of 2009 Best Collected Work, Sir Julius Vogel Award
- The Love School: Personal Essays shortlisted in the Biography section of the New Zealand Book Awards 2009
- Mortal Fire finalist for Young Adult Literature in the Los Angeles Times Best Book Awards
- Mortal Fire winner of 2014 New Zealand Post Children's Book Award for Young Adult Fiction
- Mortal Fire chosen for a White Raven Award by the International Youth Library in 2014

== Personal life ==
Knox lives in Wellington. She has been married to Fergus Barrowman, a publisher at Victoria University Press, since 1989. They have a son, Jack Barrowman. Barrowman and Knox met when he was involved in publishing her first book, After Z-Hour (1987).

== Selected works ==
- After Z-Hour (1987)
- Paremata (1989)
- Treasure (1992)
- Pomare (1994)
- Glamour and the Sea (1996)
- Tawa (1998)
- The Vintner's Luck (1998)
- The High Jump (2000)
- Black Oxen (2001)
- Billie's Kiss (2002)
- Daylight (2003)
- Dreamhunter (Book 1 of the Dreamhunter Duet) (2005)
- Dreamquake (Book 2 of the Dreamhunter Duet) (2007)
- The Love School (essays) (2008)
- The Invisible Road (2008)
- The Angel's Cut (Sequel to The Vintner's Luck) (2009)
- Mortal Fire (2013)
- Wake (2013)
- The Absolute Book (2019)
- Kings of this World (2025)
- Night, Ma (memoir, 2026)
