= Whalerider (soundtrack) =

Soundtrack album by Lisa Gerrard
- Released: July 7, 2003
- Genre: Soundtrack
- Length: 42:37
- Label: 4AD

Whalerider is the soundtrack album to the film Whale Rider, by the Australian singer/musician Lisa Gerrard. The album was released on the 4AD label in 2003.

The music on the album is also included in the film. In the liner notes, Gerrard describes the experience of recording music for Whale Rider as "one of the most intimate of my artistic life."

== Personnel ==
- Lisa Gerrard – composer, performer, arranger
- Phil Pomeroy – piano on "Pai Theme"

Additional performances by:

- Keisha Castle-Hughes on "Paikea Legend", "Pai Calls the Whales" and "Go Forward"
- Rawiri Paratene on "Biking Home"
- Keriana Thomson and the Wananga Boys on "Paikea's Whale"
- The people of Ngati Kondhi, Whangara performing the haka on "Waka in the Sky" and "Go Forward"

Mixed by Simon Bowley Mastered by Jacek Tuschewski Design by Jacek Tuschewski

== Track listing ==
No.	Title	Length
1.	"Paikea Legend"	3:29
2.	"Journey Away"	3:43
3.	"Rejection"	1:43
4.	"Biking Home"	3:25
5.	"Ancestors"	1:43
6.	"Another day"	3:56
7.	"Pai Calls the Whales"	1:32
8.	"Reiputa"	2:14
9.	"Disappointed"	2:55
10.	"They Came to Die"	2:19
11.	"Pai Theme"	3:49
12.	"Paikea's Whale"	4:01
13.	"Empty Water"	1:40
14.	"Waka in the Sky"	1:56
15.	"Go Forward"	5:52
Total length:		42:37
