= Michael Peschardt =

Michael Peschardt is a journalist and broadcaster for BBC News.

== Early life ==
Educated at Merchant Taylors' School in Northwood, London and the University of Sussex he joined the BBC as a network reporter from 1983.

== BBC career ==
After covering the England cricket team on The Ashes win in Australia in 1986/87, and the America's Cup; he decided to try living there for a year, and has been there ever since. He is the BBC's Sydney correspondent, covering a range of stories from Australia and South East Asia for the BBC's UK-based TV and Radio services, including BBC Radio 4 and BBC News as well as the international channel BBC World News.

Peschardt also hosts BBC World News's programme Peschardt's People, which profiles well-known personalities in the Asia-Pacific. Interviewees have included Singaporean actress Fann Wong, New Zealand actor Sam Neill, Bollywood star Preity Zinta and Australian basketball player Luc Longley.

As well as this, he occasionally returns to the UK to fill in for absent presenters on BBC One's morning news programme BBC Breakfast.

He also presented the BBC coverage of the 2002 Commonwealth Games from Manchester.

== ABC work ==
Peschardt guest-presented the Mornings show on the Australian Broadcasting Corporation's 702 ABC Sydney for summer 2008/09, in place of Deborah Cameron.
