= The Great Food Race =

- Genre: Reality television Cooking show
- Created by: Julie Christie
- Story by: John Hagen; Julie White
- Directed by: Graham Richie
- Presented by: Zoe Marshall
- Judges: Leonardo Bresolin; Lorenzo Bresolin
- Country of origin: New Zealand
- Original language: English
- No. of series: 1
- No. of episodes: 13

Production
- Executive producers: Greg Heathcote; Ashley Coupland
- Producer: Anna Lynch
- Editors: Aaron Dolbel; Julian Dyson
- Running time: 90 minutes
- Production company: Eyeworks

Original release
- Network: TV3
- Release: 2 February – 27 April 2014

The Great Food Race is a New Zealand competitive reality television cooking show.

It premiered on 2 February 2014 on TV3. The show is hosted by Australian Zoe Marshall and is judged by brothers Leonardo and Lorenzo Bresolin.

The series is similar to and a mixture of the format of MasterChef New Zealand and The Amazing Race whereby contestants compete in weekly elimination challenges while travelling New Zealand (and in a later leg, internationally).

The series was filmed at Studio West in West Auckland.

== Series overview ==
| Series | Episodes | Originally released | | Winners | Runners-up |
| Series | Episodes | First released | Last released | Winners | Runners-up |
|---|---|---|---|---|---|
| 1 | 13 | 2 February 2014 | 27 April 2014 | Libby & Elliot | Sara & Danny |

== Episodes ==
| No. | Original release date | NZ viewers (overnight) |
|---|---|---|
| 1 | 2 February 2014 | 149,950 |
| 2 | 9 February 2014 | 166,040 |
| 3 | 16 February 2014 | 131,290 |
| 4 | 23 February 2014 | N/A |
| 5 | 2 March 2014 | 158,020 |
| 6 | 9 March 2014 | 105,520 |
| 7 | 16 March 2014 | N/A |
| 8 | 23 March 2014 | N/A |
| 9 | 30 March 2014 | N/A |
| 10 | 6 April 2014 | N/A |
| 11 | 13 April 2014 | N/A |
| 12 | 20 April 2014 | N/A |
| 13 | 27 April 2014 | N/A |
