= The Whale Rider =

1987 Witi Ihimaera novel

- First edition cover
- Author: Witi Ihimaera
- Audio read by: Jay Laga'aia
- Illustrator: Bruce Potter
- Language: English
- Genre: Novel, children's fiction
- Set in: Whangara, 1980s
- Publisher: Heinemann
- Publication date: 1987
- Publication place: New Zealand
- Media type: Print: hardback
- Pages: 122
- ISBN: 9780868636849
- OCLC: 1031551009
- Dewey Decimal: 823.92
- LC Class: PR9639.I5 W48
- Preceded by: The Matriarch
- Followed by: Dear Miss Mansfield: a tribute to Kathleen Mansfield Beauchamp

The Whale Rider is a 1987 novel by New Zealand author Witi Ihimaera. In 2002 it was adapted into a film, Whale Rider, directed by Niki Caro.

== Plot ==
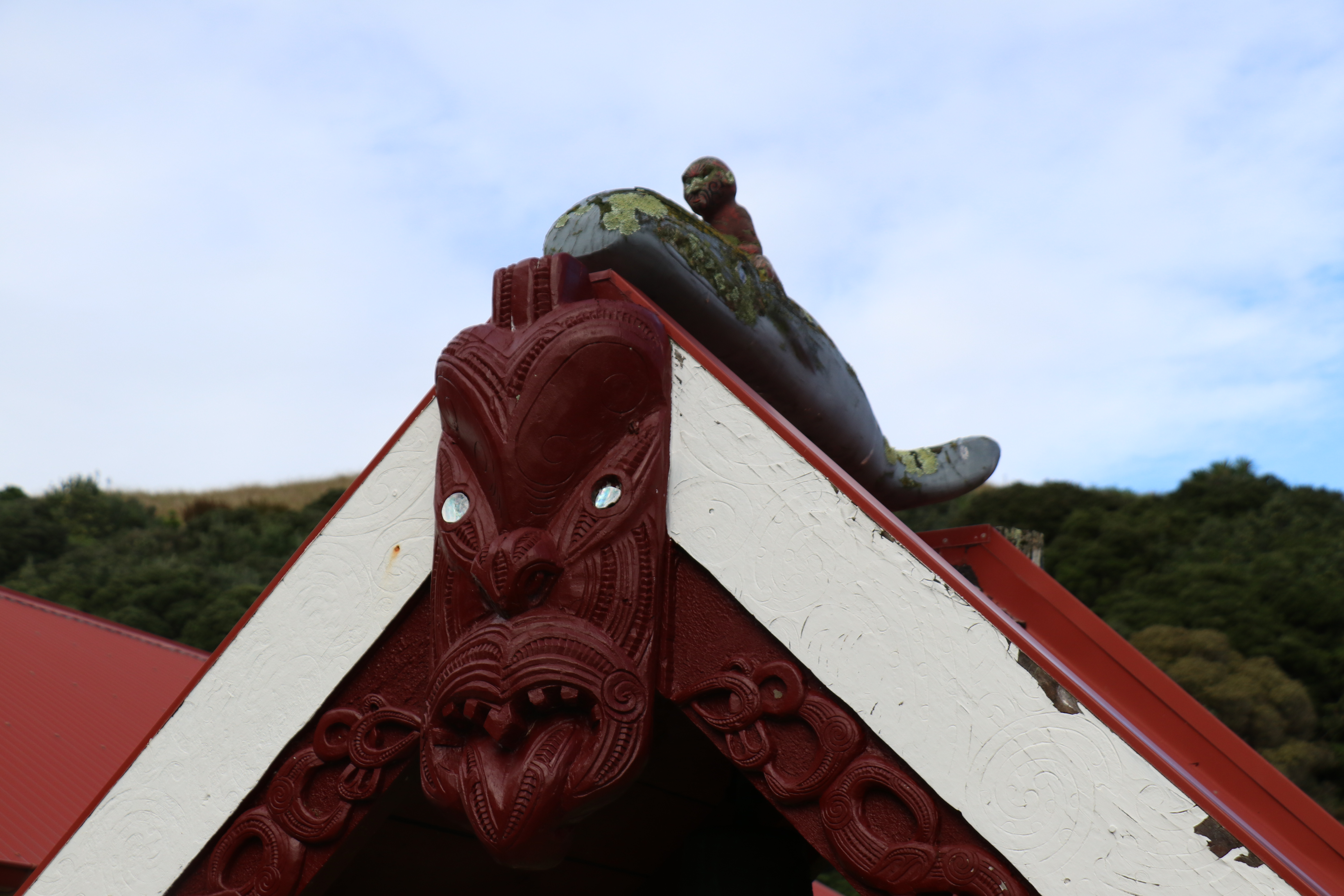
Carving of Paikea at Whangara's marae

Set in the 1980s in Whangara, a Māori community on the eastern edge of New Zealand's North Island, the novel is a retelling of the myth of Paikea.

Kahu is the eldest great-grandchild of chief Koro Apirana; had she been a boy, she would have been the future leader of the tribe but since she is a girl, she is detested by her grandfather Koro Apirana, a male chauvinist blinded by culture. She is attuned to the traditional Māori way of life, and has inherited the ability to speak to whales. The novel is narrated by Kahu's uncle, Rawiri, who travels to Australia and Papua New Guinea where the narrative focuses on the shaping of his own understanding of his Māori identity.

== Reception ==
The Whale Rider has been a worldwide bestseller, and is the most-translated work by a New Zealand author. In 1995 it was translated into Māori by Tīmoti Kāretu, as Te kaieke tohorā. In 2006 a picture book version illustrated by Bruce Potter was listed as one of the Storylines Children's Literature Foundation of New Zealand Notable Books List.

In 2022, The Whale Rider was included on the Big Jubilee Read, a list of 70 books by Commonwealth authors produced to celebrate Queen Elizabeth II's Platinum Jubilee.
