= Lijia Zhang =

Chinese writer

Lijia Zhang 张丽佳
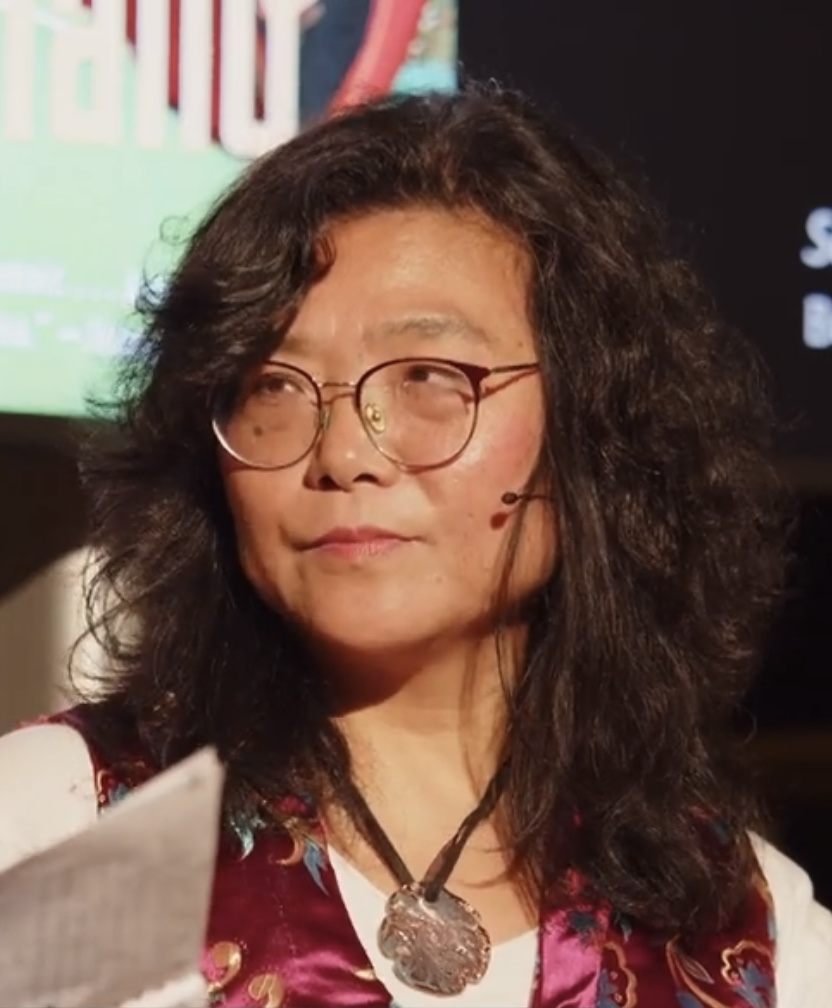
- Zhang at the British Library in 2023
- Born: May 12, 1964 (age 62); Nanjing, China
- Education: Goldsmiths, University of London (MA)
- Occupations: Writer, journalist, public speaker
- Writing career
- Period: 1999 – present
- Notable work: "Socialism Is Great!": A Worker's Memoir of the New China
- Movement: Memoir
- Website: zhanglijia.com

Lijia Zhang (Chinese: 张丽佳; pinyin: Zhāng Lìjiā; born May 12, 1964, in Nanjing) is a Chinese-born writer, journalist, social commentator and public speaker. Her work focuses on contemporary China, particularly social change, gender and women’s lives, economic transformation, inequality, shifting social values and China’s evolving role in the global order. She writes regularly in English for international publications.

Born in Nanjing, Zhang spent ten years working in a state-owned factory producing intercontinental missiles before becoming a journalist and writer. She is the author of the memoir “Socialism Is Great!”: A Worker’s Memoir of the New China and the novel Lotus, and co-author of the oral history China Remembers. Her journalism and commentary have appeared in publications including the South China Morning Post, The Guardian, Newsweek and The New York Times.

Zhang describes herself as a “cultural bridge” between China and the wider world—a role she regards as her self-appointed mission.

Lijia Zhang on Sky TV's discussion program with Francis Fukuyama in 2022

== Early life and education ==
Zhang was born into a working-class family in Nanjing and grew up in severe poverty. In 1980, when she was sixteen, her family took her out of school so that she could earn money. She began working at a military factory producing intercontinental missiles. During her decade there, she found solace in literature and taught herself English, initially as an escape from the routine of factory life.

During the 1989 protest movement, Zhang organised workers at her factory in support of the student-led demonstrations. She later wrote about her experience of the movement for The New York Times.

Zhang went to Britain in 1990, where she studied journalism. She later returned to China and began working with foreign correspondents before establishing herself as a journalist and writer. In 2003, she studied creative writing at Goldsmiths, University of London, receiving an MA.

== Journalism and Career ==
After returning to China in the early 1990s, Zhang began her journalism career by assisting foreign correspondents as a researcher, interpreter and fixer. She subsequently wrote for international newspapers and magazines, with her work examining China’s social, cultural and economic transformation.

Her articles and commentary have appeared in publications including the South China Morning Post, The Guardian, The Financial Times, Newsweek, The New York Times, The Independent, The Japan Times and the Far Eastern Economic Review. Her work explores inequality, shifting social values and China’s evolving role in the global order.

Zhang is also a commentator on China for international broadcast media. She has appeared on the BBC, Channel 4, CNN, NPR, ABC Australia and Al Jazeera. (Impact Podcast) In 2008, she was the subject of the BBC television documentary Peschardt’s People. In 2026, she was interviewed at length for the Impact Podcast about China’s social transformation and its relationship with the wider world.

== Books ==
Zhang co-authored China Remembers (Oxford University Press, 1999), an oral history of the People’s Republic of China.

Her memoir, “Socialism Is Great!”: A Worker’s Memoir of the New China, recounts her decade working in a missile factory during China’s reform era and her transition from factory worker to writer. The hardback edition was published in the United States by Atlas & Co. in 2008, followed by a paperback edition from Random House a year later. The memoir has also been published in Australia, India, the Netherlands, Italy, France, Brazil, Poland, South Korea and Germany. Historian Jonathan Spence called it “a truly original contribution to our understanding of modern China”.

Her first novel, Lotus, was published by Macmillan in 2017. Set in Shenzhen, it follows a young migrant woman who becomes a sex worker. The novel was inspired by Zhang’s discovery of a family secret: her grandmother had been sold to a brothel as a young woman. The novel explores migration, sexuality, gender and the tension between traditional expectations and individual aspirations in contemporary China. It was named one of NPR’s notable books of 2017 and was later discussed by Zhang on the BBC World Service’s World Book Club.

Zhang also writes short fiction. Her story “Permission” appeared in Silkroad magazine’s Short Story Anthology in 2017, while “Bright and Fragrant” was included in The Best Asian Speculative Fiction 2018.

She is currently completing a historical novel based on the life of Qiu Jin, a revolutionary and pioneering Chinese feminist who defied the social conventions of her time by unbinding her feet, wearing men’s clothing and organising an armed uprising against Qing rule.

== Writing in English ==
Zhang writes primarily in English despite being a native Chinese speaker. She has said that the decision followed an unsuccessful attempt in the early 1990s to publish a Chinese-language book about Western perceptions of Mao Zedong. According to Zhang, the manuscript was rejected by Chinese censors for being considered “too negative”, after which she decided to write in English.

She has described writing in English as a form of liberation, both politically and creatively, while also acknowledging the linguistic and cultural losses involved in writing in a second language.

== Gender and women’s issues ==
Lijia Zhang accompanied Xiao Meili during the young feminist's walk from to Guangzhou to protest child sexual abuse in 2014

The Fourth World Conference on Women, held in Beijing in 1995, sparked Zhang’s interest in gender. Soon afterwards, she joined one of China’s earliest feminist groups, East Meets West. Gender and the changing position of women in China are recurring subjects in her journalism, fiction and public commentary. Her work has addressed domestic violence, sex work, marriage, motherhood, demographic change and women’s economic and social position.

Zhang has also spoken at events focused on women’s lives and feminism. In February 2019, she joined writer Yan Ge for the University of Leeds seminar Women in China: Fictions and Realities, which explored fiction and gender in China. The following month, she took part in a NüVoices panel at SOAS University of London entitled Being Feminist in China: Gender Issues Across Generations, alongside feminist activists Zhang Leilei and Xiao Meili. In 2024, she discussed the history of women’s liberation with journalist Nesrine Malik in Georgetown University’s Global Histories of Feminism series.

In 2026, The Persistent published an essay by Zhang examining why growing numbers of Chinese women were rejecting or postponing marriage and motherhood. The article drew partly on interviews she had conducted with women in several Chinese cities over the preceding two years.

== Public speaking and media ==
Lijia Zhang addresses HSBC annual conference in Shanghai in 2015

Zhang has spoken internationally about contemporary China, drawing on her personal experience as well as her work as a journalist and writer. She has lectured at universities and institutions including Harvard University, Columbia University, New York University, London Business School and the European Institute for Asian Studies, as well as at numerous financial institutions.

In October 2009, she gave a talk at Stanford University’s Center for East Asian Studies entitled “Socialism Is Great!”: From Rocket Factory Girl to International Media. The talk addressed China’s social transformation during the reform era and China’s position in the world.

In the same year, Zhang received a fellowship from the US Department of State to participate in the University of Iowa’s International Writing Program. During the fellowship, she was invited to speak at universities and organisations, including the Iowa Council for International Understanding.

In 2018, she received the Mulan Award in the United Kingdom for her contribution to arts and literature.

Zhang also serves as a social commentator. In November 2022, during China’s White Paper protests, she joined a Sky News discussion with political scientist Francis Fukuyama about the demonstrations, China’s zero-COVID policy and the government’s possible response.

In 2024, Zhang appeared as a commentator in the three-part SWR–ARTE documentary series Mao: China’s Red Emperor.

== Personal life ==
Zhang was married to British journalist Calum MacLeod, with whom she has two daughters. She moved from Beijing to London in 2018 and continues to spend time in both Britain and China.
