= Memory & Desire =

1998 film by Niki Caro

- U.S. distribution DVD cover
- Directed by: Niki Caro
- Screenplay by: Niki Caro
- Based on: "Of Memory and Desire" by Peter Wells
- Produced by: Owen Hughes
- Starring: Yuri Kinugawa; Eugene Nomura
- Cinematography: Dion Beebe
- Edited by: Margot Francis
- Music by: Peter Scholes
- Production company: Frame Up Films
- Distributed by: Footprint Films
- Release date: 24 June 1998
- Running time: 89 minutes
- Country: New Zealand
- Languages: English; Japanese

Memory & Desire is a 1998 New Zealand romantic drama film written and directed by Niki Caro, in her feature film directorial debut. The film is based on the 1997 short story "Of Memory and Desire" by Peter Wells.

== Plot ==
Sayo and Keiji are a Japanese couple who elope to New Zealand to get married. On their honeymoon, frustrated by being unable to consummate their marriage, Keiji fatally drowns in a swimming accident. Heartbroken after losing her husband, Sayo contemplates traveling back to Japan to once again live with her domineering mother, per Japanese tradition. Instead, she stays in New Zealand on the beach where Keiji drowned to find peace.

== Cast ==
- Yuri Kinugawa as Sayo
- Eugene Nomura as Keiji
- Yoko Narahashi as Mrs. Nakajima
- Joel Tobeck as Nod
- Rome Kanda as Tour Guide

== Production ==
The film was shot in New Zealand, at Studio West in West Auckland.

== Awards and nominations ==
Group	Category	Recipient	Result
1998 Cannes Film Festival	Caméra d'Or	Niki Caro	Nominated
1998 Stockholm International Film Festival	Bronze Horse	Niki Caro	Nominated
1998 Stockholm International Film Festival	Best actress	Yuri Kinugawa	Won
1999 New Zealand Film and TV Awards	Best Film	Owen Hughes	Won
1999 New Zealand Film and TV Awards	Best Foreign Performer	Yuri Kinugawa	Won
1999 New Zealand Film and TV Awards	Best Design	Grant Major	Won
1999 New Zealand Film and TV Awards	Special Jury Prize	Niki Caro	Won
