= Calum MacLeod =

Cal(l)um MacLeod or Macleod may refer to:

- Calum MacLeod (of Raasay) (1911–1988), crofter
- Calum MacLeod (cricketer) (born 1988), Scotland professional cricketer
- Calum MacLeod (producer) (born 1981), producer and writer
- Calum MacLeod (footballer) (born 2006), Scottish footballer
- Calum MacLeod (born 1969), reporter for USA Today, used to be married to Lijia Zhang
- Callum MacLeod (born 1988), British racing driver
- Callum Macleod (TV personality)
