= Studio West (film studio) =

New Zealand film and television production facility

Coordinates: 36.9061°S 174.6369°E

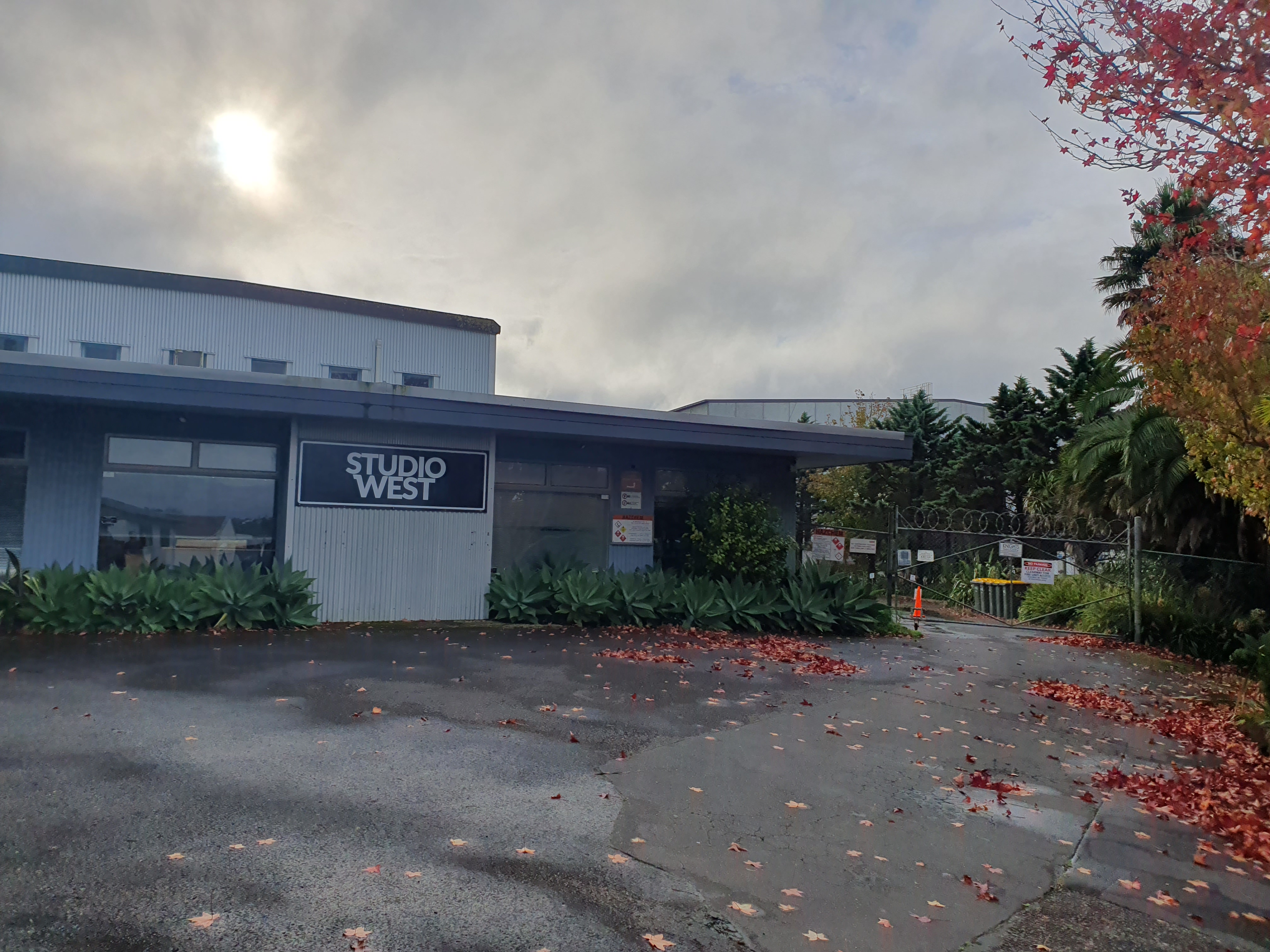
- Industry: Film, television
- Founded: 1996; 29 years ago
- Headquarters: 16 Waikaukau Road, Glen Eden, Auckland, New Zealand
- Website: www.studiowest.co.nz

Studio West is a motion picture and television production facility in West Auckland, New Zealand. Opening in 1996, the studio became the primary filming location for the United States television series Power Rangers in 2002. The eight acre site, 20 minutes from the Auckland City Centre, features four sound stages, including the largest purpose-build sound-stage in Auckland, which opened in 2022.

In addition to Power Rangers, the studio has also been involved in the production of numerous films and television series, including The Vintner's Luck, Under the Mountain, Yogi Bear, Young Hercules and Xena: Warrior Princess.

== History ==
Studio West opened in 1996 as a privately owned studio, operated by husband and wife team Murray and Margaret Sweetman.

In 2002, the Auckland Regional Economic Development Strategy promoted the screen production industry in Auckland as a major driver of economic growth. This led to Studio West being supported to grow by the councils of the Auckland Region in the early 2000s.

Studio West began filming the television series Power Rangers from 2002. The filming for Power Rangers meant that the majority of the studio time was booked out during the 2000s, with many clients turned away.

In 2015, the joint owners of the property, Ralph Davies, Murray Sweetman and David Rowell, all figures within the New Zealand film industry, listed the studio for sale.

Studio West began planning a large expansion project in 2019. The construction was put on hold due to the effects of COVID-19 in New Zealand. In mid-2022, a new studio opened, which became the largest purpose-built sound stage in Auckland, at 3,400 square metres.

== Site ==
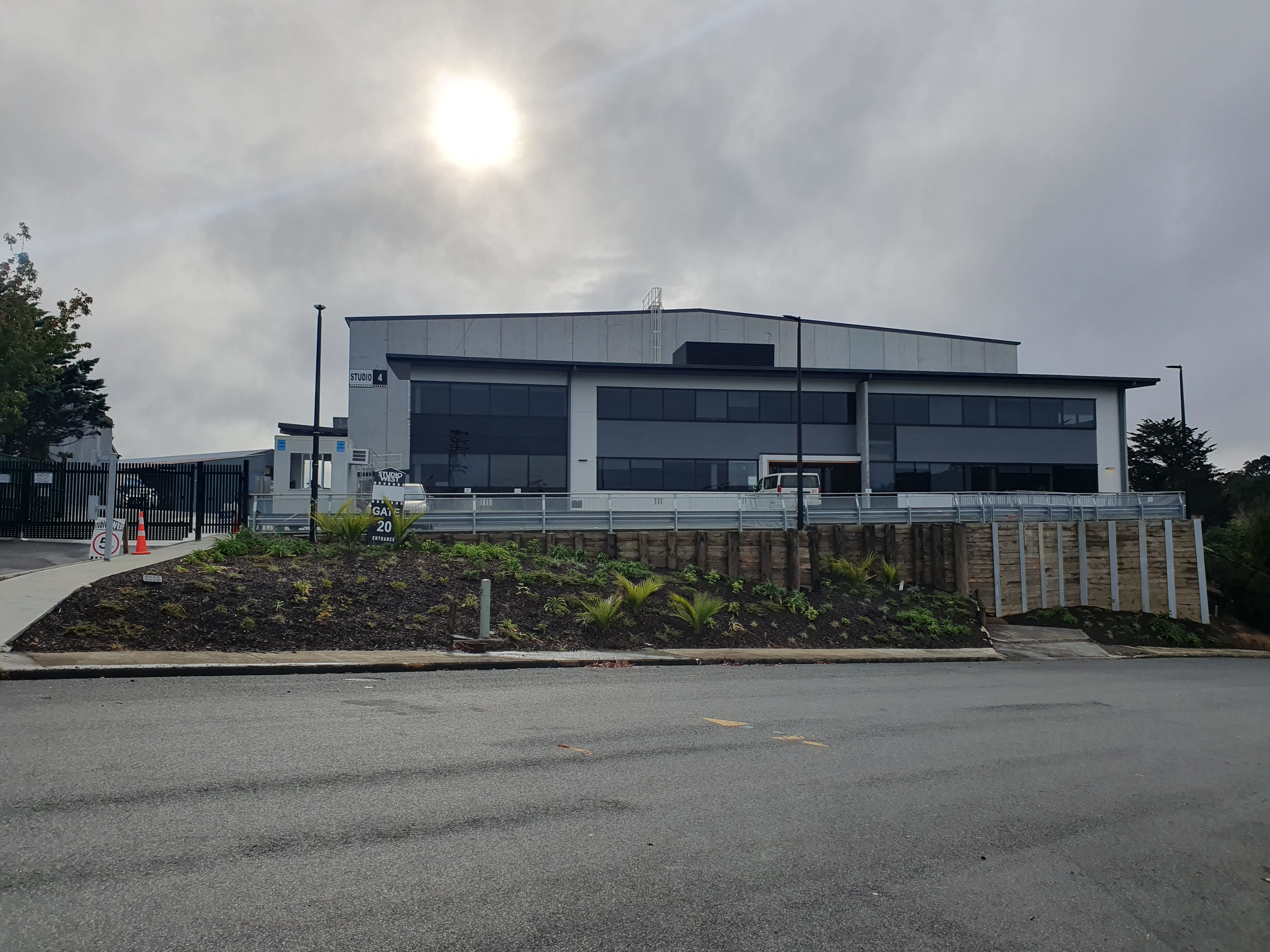
The 3,400 square metre Studio 4 soundstage is the largest in Auckland

The studio is located on an eight acre section of Glen Eden in West Auckland. The studio's currently has four sound stages, measuring 312 square metres (3,360 sq ft), 525 square metres (5,650 sq ft), 700 square metres (7,500 sq ft) and 3,400 square metres (37,000 sq ft). A new fifth studio is planned to be opened in 2023.

== Productions ==
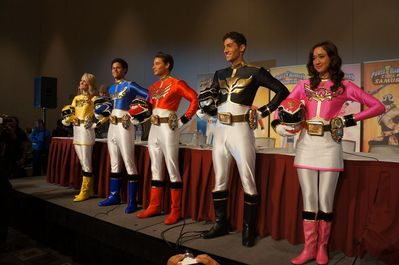
The television show Power Rangers has been filmed at Studio West since 2002

=== Films ===
Year	Name
1998	Memory & Desire
1998	A Soldier's Sweetheart
2000	Jubilee
2002	SuperFire
2002	You Wish!
2003	Eddie's Million Dollar Cook-Off
2003	Riverworld
2004	Maiden Voyage
2006	Wendy Wu: Homecoming Warrior
2006	Ozzie
2007	Johnny Kapahala: Back on Board
2007	The Tattooist
2009	The Strength of Water
2009	The Vintner's Luck
2009	Under the Mountain
2009	Skyrunners
2010	The Kiwi Who Saved Britain
2010	Avalon High
2010	Yogi Bear
2012	Siege
2016	Pike River
2015	Cradle
2019	Guns Akimbo
2023	The Convert

=== Television ===
Year	Name
1998	The Amazing Adventures of Moko Toa
1999	Greenstone
1999	Forbidden Island
1999	Young Hercules
2000–2003	Street Legal
2001	The Weakest Link
2001	Xena: Warrior Princess
2003–2022	Power Rangers
2004	Serial Killers
2014	The Great Food Race
2015	When We Go to War
2016–2018	Roman Empire
2016	The Making of the Mob: Chicago
2020	The Wilds
