= Keisha Castle-Hughes =

New Zealand actress

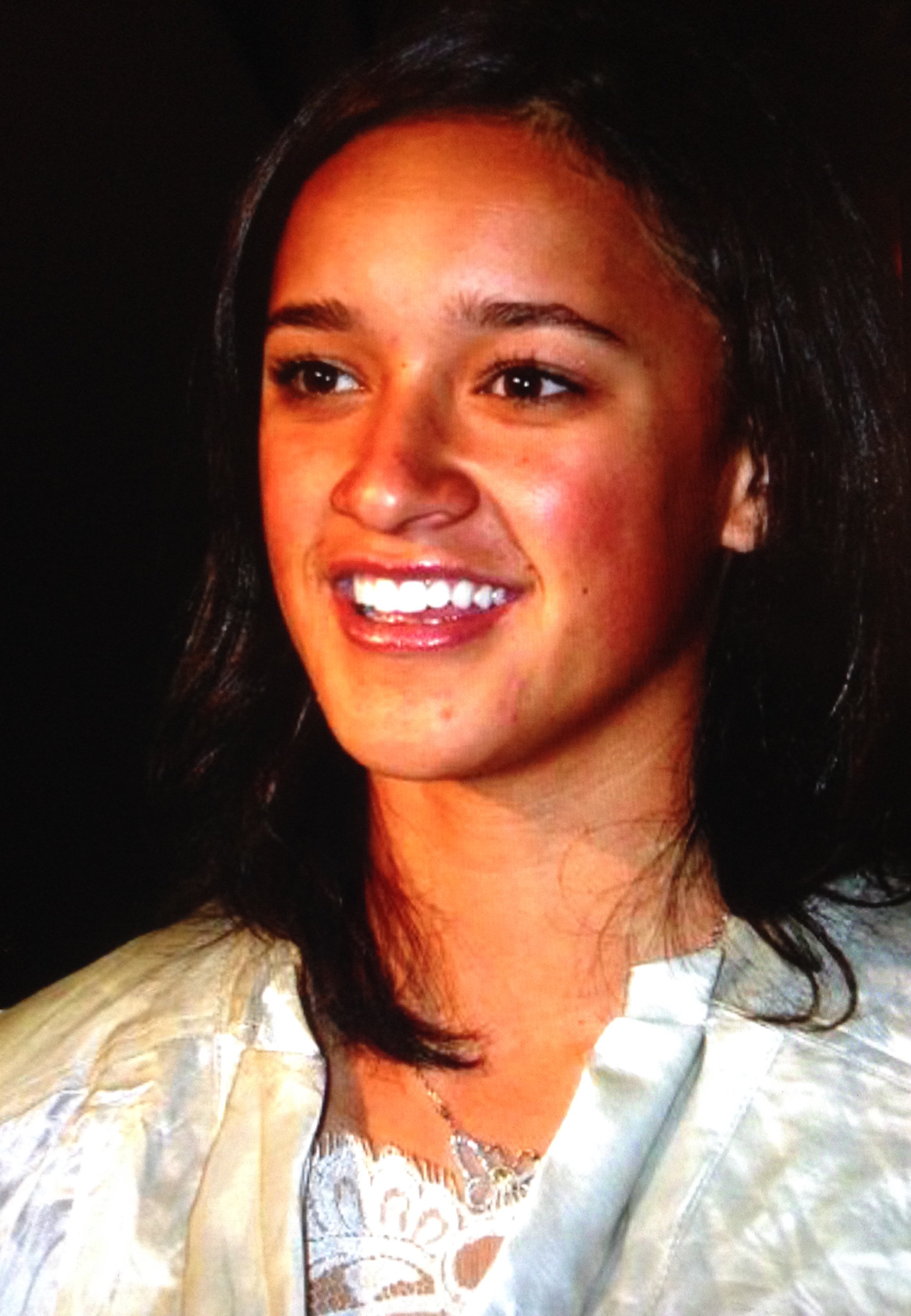
- Castle-Hughes in 2019
- Born: 24 March 1990 (age 36); Donnybrook, Western Australia, Australia
- Citizenship: New Zealand
- Occupation: Actress
- Years active: 2001–present
- Spouses: Jonathan Morrison (m. 2013; div. 2016) Donny Grahamer (m. 2021)
- Partner: Bradley Hull (2003–2010)
- Children: 2

Keisha Castle-Hughes (born 24 March 1990) is a New Zealand actress. She made her acting debut in the drama film Whale Rider (2002), for which she was nominated for the Academy Award for Best Actress, making her the second-youngest nominee in this category. Her subsequent films include the biblical drama film The Nativity Story (2006) and the teen film Hey, Hey, It's Esther Blueburger (2008). On television, she had appeared as Obara Sand in Game of Thrones (2015–2017), and starred as Special Agent Hana Gibson in all six seasons of FBI: Most Wanted (2020–2025).

== Early life ==
Castle-Hughes was born in 1990 in Donnybrook, Western Australia, to a Māori mother, Desrae Hughes, of Ngāti Porou, Tainui, and Ngāpuhi descent, and Tim Castle, an Anglo-Australian father. Her family moved to Auckland, New Zealand, when she was four years old. She attained citizenship in 2001. Castle-Hughes attended Penrose High School and graduated from Senior College of New Zealand in Auckland.

== Career ==
In 2002, Castle-Hughes made her debut in the film Whale Rider, in which she played the main role of Paikea Apirana (Pai). She had no previous acting experience and went directly from her Auckland school classroom to the film set when the shoot began in New Zealand in late 2001. Castle-Hughes received widespread critical acclaim for her performance, and in 2004 she received an Academy Award nomination for Best Actress at the 76th Academy Awards. Although she did not win the Best Actress award (it went to Charlize Theron for Monster), at age 13 she became the youngest person nominated in this category at the time and the third Indigenous actress, after Merle Oberon and Jocelyne LaGarde, to be nominated for an Oscar.

She soon followed the role by appearing in Prince's controversial "Cinnamon Girl" music video and with a shoot in Vanity Fair magazine. In 2004, Castle-Hughes was invited to join the Academy of Motion Picture Arts and Sciences.

In 2005, Castle-Hughes had a small part as Queen Apailana in Star Wars: Revenge of the Sith. In 2006, she portrayed the starring role of the Virgin Mary in The Nativity Story. New York Times critic, A. O. Scott, said that she "seemed entirely unfazed by the demands of playing Mary. She had the poise and intelligence to play the character not as an icon of maternity, but rather as a headstrong, thoughtful adolescent transformed by an unimaginable responsibility." The Christian-themed film earned only $8 million during its opening week, but its box office surged during the week of Christmas.

In 2008, Castle-Hughes appeared in the Australian comedy-drama film Hey, Hey, It's Esther Blueburger, which was filmed in late 2006.

Castle-Hughes reunited with New Zealand director Niki Caro for the film adaption of The Vintner's Luck, which had its international premiere in September 2009.

Castle-Hughes starred in the Japanese horror film Vampire, and she also played a recurring role as Axl's flatmate in The Almighty Johnsons which premiered in 2011. In 2011 Castle-Hughes also played a minor part in the film Red Dog as Rosa the veterinary assistant and wife of Vanno.

In 2014, Castle-Hughes had a guest role in the American television series The Walking Dead in which she played Joan.

In 2015, she joined the cast of the HBO TV series Game of Thrones in Season 5 as Obara Sand. She pursued a role on the show in part because she is a fan of the books. Castle-Hughes found out that she had won the role the night the Season 4 episode "The Mountain and the Viper" aired, in which her on-screen father's death was shown. She described having a very intense emotional reaction to the scene, because of the connection between the characters on the show.

Beginning in 2020, Castle-Hughes has played Hana Gibson, an FBI analyst, on CBS's FBI: Most Wanted.

In a return to the Star Wars franchise, Castle-Hughes voiced Dr. Emerie Karr, an Imperial scientist at the Mount Tantiss facility and female clone of Jango Fett, in Seasons 2 and 3 of Star Wars: The Bad Batch.

== Activism ==
Castle-Hughes campaigned for Greenpeace as part of the SignOn.org.nz climate campaign in 2009. New Zealand Prime Minister John Key initially admonished her to "stick to acting", but offered a week later to discuss the issues with her over tea after she maintained she knew more about them than he gave her credit for.

== Personal life ==
In October 2006, when she was 16, it was announced that Castle-Hughes and boyfriend Bradley Hull were expecting a child together. Their daughter was born in 2007. Castle-Hughes and Hull broke up in 2010 after seven years together.

In 2012, Castle-Hughes began dating Jonathan Morrison. After six weeks together, the couple became engaged in August 2012. Their wedding took place on Valentine's Day 2013. They were divorced in December 2016.

In early 2014, Castle-Hughes revealed that she has bipolar disorder, in the wake of television personality Charlotte Dawson's suicide.

In early 2021, she married Donny Grahamer in New York City. A month later she announced that she was pregnant with her second child, a daughter born in June.

== Filmography ==
Film and television
Year	Title	Role	Notes
2002	Whale Rider	Paikea	Nominated for Academy Award for Best Actress
2004–2009	bro'Town	Herself	3 episodes
2005	Star Wars: Revenge of the Sith	Queen Apailana of Naboo	
2006	The Nativity Story	Mary	
2008	Hey Hey It's Esther Blueburger	Sunni	
2009	The Vintner's Luck	Celeste	
2009	Piece of My Heart	Young Kat	TV movie
2010	Legend of the Seeker	Maia / The Creator	Episode: "Creator"
2011	Mika's Aroha Mardi Gras	Self	TV special
2011	Vampire	Jellyfish	
2011	Red Dog	Rose	
2011–2013	The Almighty Johnsons	Gaia	Series Regular - seasons 1-2, Recurring - season 3
2012	Rewind	Priya	TV movie, post-production
2013	The Stolen	Aroha	
2014	The Walking Dead	Joan	Episode: "Slabtown"
2014	Queen of Carthage	Simi	Film
2015–2017	Game of Thrones	Obara Sand	8 episodes
2016	Roadies	Donna Mancini	Series regular
2017	Thank You for Your Service	Alea	
2017	Find Your Voice	Princess	
2017	Manhunt: Unabomber	Tabby Milgrim	
2018	On the Ropes	Jessica Connor	TV miniseries
2018	Wellwood	Deputy Gracie Marsh	Film; also producer
2019	Tone-Deaf	Wyatt	
2019–2020, 2023	FBI	Special Agent Hana Gibson	3 episodes
2020–2025	FBI: Most Wanted	Special Agent Hana Gibson	Main role
2023–2024	Star Wars: The Bad Batch	Emerie Karr (voice)	11 episodes
2025	My Life is Murder	Baily Browne	1 episode

== Accolades ==
Year	Award	Category	Work	Result
2003	New Zealand Film Awards	Best Actress	Whale Rider	Won
2003	Washington DC Area Film Critics Association	Best Actress	Whale Rider	Nominated
2004	Academy Awards	Best Actress in a Leading Role	Whale Rider	Nominated
2004	Chicago Film Critics Association	Best Actress	Whale Rider	Nominated
2004	Chicago Film Critics Association	Most Promising Performer	Whale Rider	Won
2004	Chlotrudis Awards	Best Actress	Whale Rider	Nominated
2004	Critics Choice Movie Awards	Best Young Actor/Actress	Whale Rider	Won
2004	Gold Derby Film Awards	Best Lead Actress	Whale Rider	Nominated
2004	Gold Derby Film Awards	Breakthrough Performance	Whale Rider	Won
2004	NAACP Image Awards	Outstanding Actress in a Motion Picture	Whale Rider	Nominated
2004	Online Film Critics Society	Breakthrough Performer	Whale Rider	Won
2004	Phoenix Film Critics Society	Best Performance by a Youth - Female	Whale Rider	Nominated
2004	Actor Awards	Outstanding Performance by a Female Actor in a Supporting Role	Whale Rider	Nominated
2007	Young Artist Awards	Best Leading Young Actress - Feature Film	The Nativity Story	Nominated
2009	Qantas TV and Film Awards	Best Supporting Actress	Piece of My Heart	Won

== See also ==
- List of New Zealand Academy Award winners and nominees
- List of oldest and youngest Academy Award winners and nominees — Youngest nominees for Best Lead Actress
- List of actors with Academy Award nominations
