= Dreamhunter Duet =

Fantasy novel series by Elizabeth Knox

Dreamhunter (2005) and Dreamquake (2007) are two fantasy novels, written by New Zealand author Elizabeth Knox. The former title was nominated for Montana New Zealand Book Awards in 2006, and was an American Library Association best book of 2007. Dreamquake received recognition as an Honor Book for the Michael L. Printz Award in 2008. The U.K. title of Dreamhunter is The Rainbow Opera.

== Synopsis ==
Southland is an alternate universe Edwardian version of a New Zealand, one without any indigenous inhabitants. Instead, Southland boasts an other-dimensional realm entitled "the Place," in which those able to do so can 'capture' dreams that are bound to particular areas of Place geography, which exist within specific bands. As a result of the discovery of guided dreaming, a dreamhunter industry has been created. Professional dreamhunters occupy a social niche comparable to artists and authors in our own world, and one of the most imposing structures in Founderston, Southland's capital, is the "Rainbow Opera," in which virtuoso dreamhunters perform before the nation's elite.

Grace Tiebold and Tziga Hame are sister and brother in law by marriage, and are particularly potent dreamhunters. While Grace's daughter Rose lacks the talent, Tziga's daughter Laura possesses it. Each year, scores of teenagers attempt to become dreamhunters in a rite of passage, but few achieve interdimensional transit to the Place. Tziga and Laura Hame are able to create golems using an ancestral power called "The Measures." In the second novel, it transpires that these golems have an unheralded but ingenious relationship to the Place's very existence.

Southland was settled by the British, later than America but earlier than Australia. People from Elprus, an Aegean island obliterated by volcanic activity, arrived in the eighteenth century. Southland's official church is a "Southern Orthodox Church" which regards the practice of dreamhunting as immoral and unethical. Southland's republican government begs to differ, as its unscrupulous Minister of the Interior, Cas Doran, was the architect of the Intangible Resources Act 1896, and is planning a coup d'etat which will exploit dreamhunter capabilities to provide manipulated consent to his anticipated authoritarian rule.

== Bibliography ==
- Elizabeth Knox: Dreamhunter: Sydney: Fourth Estate: 2005: ISBN 0-7322-8193-8
- Elizabeth Knox: Dreamquake: Sydney: Fourth Estate: 2007: ISBN 0-7322-8194-6
- Elizabeth Knox: Dreamhunter: USA: Frances Foster Books, FSG: 2006: ISBN 978-0-374-31853-6
- Elizabeth Knox: Dreamquake: USA: Frances Foster Books, FSG: 2007: ISBN 978-0-374-31854-3
