= Whale Rider =

2002 film by Niki Caro

- US theatrical release poster
- Directed by: Niki Caro
- Screenplay by: Niki Caro
- Based on: The Whale Rider by Witi Ihimaera
- Produced by: Tim Sanders; John Barnett; Frank Hübner
- Starring: Keisha Castle-Hughes; Rawiri Paratene; Vicky Haughton; Cliff Curtis
- Narrated by: Keisha Castle-Hughes
- Cinematography: Leon Narbey
- Edited by: David Coulson
- Music by: Lisa Gerrard
- Production companies: South Pacific Pictures; ApolloMedia; Pandora Film; New Zealand Film Production Fund; New Zealand Film Commission; NZ On Air; Filmstiftung Nordrhein-Westfalen
- Distributed by: Buena Vista International (Australia and New Zealand); Pandora Film (Germany)
- Release dates: 11 September 2002 (Toronto); 30 January 2003 (New Zealand); 25 July 2003 (Germany)
- Running time: 101 minutes
- Countries: New Zealand; Germany
- Languages: English; Māori
- Budget: NZ$$9.2 million (approx. US$3.5 million)
- Box office: $41.4 million

Whale Rider is a 2002 New Zealand drama film written and directed by Niki Caro, based on the 1987 novel by Witi Ihimaera. The film stars Keisha Castle-Hughes as Kahu Paikea Apirana, a twelve-year-old Māori girl whose ambition is to become the chief of the tribe. Her grandfather believes that this is a role reserved for males only. A coproduction between New Zealand and Germany, the film was shot on location in Whangara, the setting of the novel.

Whale Rider had its world premiere on 9 September 2002 at the Toronto International Film Festival. It received critical acclaim upon its release and was a commercial success, earning $41.4 million on a $3.5 million budget. At the 76th Academy Awards, Keisha Castle-Hughes became the youngest nominee for the Academy Award for Best Actress, at age 13. In 2005, the film was named on the BFI list of the "50 Films You Should See By the Age of 14".

== Plot ==
The film's plot follows the story of Paikea Apirana (Pai for short). In her village, the leader is traditionally a first-born son, a direct patrilineal descendant of Paikea, the Whale Rider who rode on top of a whale from Hawaiki. Pai is originally born a twin, but her twin brother and her mother died during childbirth. Pai is female and so technically cannot inherit the leadership. While her grandfather, Koro, later forms an affectionate bond with his granddaughter, carrying her to school every day on his bicycle, he also condemns and resents her for conflicts within the tribe.

After the death of his wife and despite overwhelming pressure from Koro, Pai's father refuses to assume traditional leadership or finish the waka that he had started building for the baby son; instead, he moves to Germany to pursue a career as an artist. At one point, Paikea decides to live with her father because her grandfather says he doesn't want her. However, as they are driving away, she finds that she cannot bear to leave the sea as the whale seems to be calling her back. Pai tells her father to return her home.

Koro leads a cultural school for the village's first-born boys, hoping to find a new leader. He teaches the boys to use a taiaha (fighting stick), which is traditionally reserved for males. Pai is interested in the lessons, but is discouraged sternly by Koro for doing so. Pai feels that she can become the leader (although no woman has ever done so) and is determined to succeed. Her grandmother, Nanny, tells Pai that her second son, Pai's uncle, had won a taiaha tournament in his youth while he was still slim and so Pai secretly learns from him. She also secretly follows Koro's lessons. One of the students, Hemi, is also sympathetic towards her.

Koro is furious when he finds out, particularly when she wins a taiaha fight against Hemi. However, Koro's frustration turns to horror when none of the boys succeed at the traditional task of recovering a whale tooth (rei puta) that he threw into the ocean - the mission that would prove one of them worthy of becoming leader. With the loss of the rei puta, Koro (in despair) calls out the ancient ones: the whales. In an attempt to help, Pai also calls out to them and they hear her call.

One day Pai, her uncle, her uncle's girlfriend Shilo, and others take the boat to where Koro flung the rei puta into the sea. Pai confidently declares she'll find it and dives into the water. She finds the rei puta, which means that she is the rightful leader. Nanny does not think Koro is ready to accept this and does not tell him. Pai, in an attempt to bridge the rift that has formed, invites Koro to be her guest of honor at a concert of Māori chants that her school is putting on. Unknown to all, she had won an interschool speech contest with a touching dedication to Koro and the traditions of the village. However, Koro is late, and as he is walking to the school, he notices that numerous southern right whales (tohorā) (Note: "Tohorā" is also the general term for whales in Māori language while "Paikea" also stands for humpback whales.) are beached near Pai's home.

The entire village attempts to coax and drag them back into the water, but all efforts prove unsuccessful, and even a tractor does not help. Koro sees that as a sign of his failure so he despairs further. He severely reprimands Pai against touching the largest whale because she has "done enough" damage with her presumption. When Koro walks away, Pai climbs onto the back of the largest whale on the beach and coaxes it to re-enter the ocean. The whale leads the entire pod back into the sea; Pai submerges completely underwater before being thrown off the whale's back. Fearing Pai is lost, Nanny reveals to Koro that his granddaughter found the rei puta, and Koro realizes the error of his ways. When Pai is found and brought to the hospital, Koro declares her the leader and asks for her forgiveness.

The film ends with Pai's father, grandparents, and uncle coming together to celebrate her status as the next leader, as the finished waka is hauled into the sea for its maiden voyage.

== Cast ==
- Keisha Castle-Hughes as Paikea Apirana
- Rawiri Paratene as Koro
- Vicky Haughton as Nanny Flowers
- Cliff Curtis as Porourangi
- Grant Roa as Uncle Rawiri
- Mana Taumaunu as Hemi
- Rachel House as Shilo
- Taungaroa Emile as Willie
- Tammy Davis as Dog
- Mabel Wharekawa as Maka (as Mabel Wharekawa-Burt)
- Rawinia Clarke as Miro
- Tahei Simpson as Miss Parata
- Roi Taimana as Hemi's Dad (as Roimata Taimana)
- Elizabeth Skeen as Rehua
- Tyronne White as Jake (as Tyrone White)
- Taupua Whakataka-Brightwell as Ropata
- Tenia McClutchie-Mita as Wiremu
- Peter Patuwai as Bubba
- Rutene Spooner as Parekura
- Riccardo Davis as Maui
- Apiata Whangaparita-Apanui as Henare
- John Sumner as Obstetrician
- Sam Woods as Young Rawiri
- Pura Tangira as Ace
- Jane O'Kane as Anne
- Aumuri Parata-Haua as Baby Paikea

== Production ==
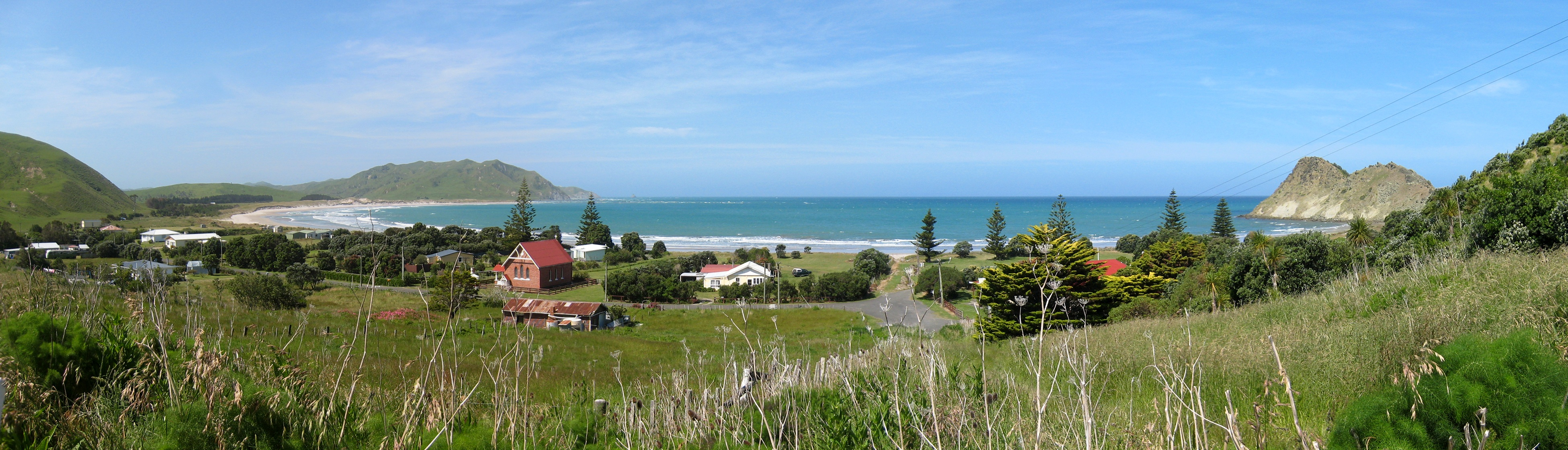
The community of Whangara, where the film is set

The film had budget of NZ$9,235,000. It received $2.5 million from the New Zealand Film Production Fund. Additional financing came from ApolloMedia, Filmstiftung NRW, the New Zealand Film Commission and NZ On Air. Casting director Diana Rowan visited numerous schools to find an actress to play Pai. 10,000 children were auditioned before narrowing it down to 12. Castle-Hughes impressed Caro in the resulting workshop and was cast as Pai.

The film was shot in Whangara (Note: A small town in the Gisborne District.), and in Auckland. Producer John Barnett said "This novel was set in Whangara and it would almost have been heresy to shoot anywhere else. There are very physical things that are described in the book – the sweep of the bay, the island that looks like a whale, the meeting houses, the number of houses that are present and of course, the people whose legend we were telling. ... If we'd gone somewhere else and tried to manufacture the surroundings and the ambience, then I think it would have been noticeable in the picture."

The whale beaching was depicted using full-scale models created by Auckland-based Glasshammer Visual Effects. The 60 ft (18 m)-long waka seen at the end of the film was made in two halves in Auckland before being transported to Whangara. The waka was given to the Whangara community after filming concluded.

== Release ==
=== Premiere ===
Whale Rider premiered at the Toronto International Film Festival in 2002.

=== Theatrical release ===
Whale Rider was theatrically released in 2003 in New Zealand and Germany. The film had a limited release in the USA on 6 June 2003 and then expanded on 29 August that same year.

=== Home media ===
Whale Rider was released on DVD and VHS on 28 October 2003 by Columbia TriStar Home Entertainment.

Shout! Factory released a 15th anniversary Blu-ray of Whale Rider on their Shout! Select imprint on 22 August 2017.

== Reception ==
=== Critical response ===
The film received critical acclaim and Castle-Hughes's performance won rave reviews. Based on 155 reviews collected by Rotten Tomatoes, the film has an overall approval rating from critics of 91%, with an average score of 7.77 as of October 2020. The website's critical consensus states, "An empowering and uplifting movie, with a wonderful performance by Castle-Hughes". By comparison, Metacritic, which assigns a normalised rating out of 100 top reviews from mainstream critics, calculated an average score of 79, based on 31 reviews, indicating "generally favourable reviews". Margaret Pomeranz and David Stratton of The Movie Show both gave the film four out of five stars. Pomeranz said "Niki Caro has directed this uplifting story with great sensitivity, eliciting affecting performances from a sterling cast, and a wonderful one from newcomer Keisha Castle-Hughes." Roger Ebert gave the film four out of four stars and said, "The genius of the movie is the way it sidesteps all of the obvious cliches of the underlying story and makes itself fresh, observant, tough and genuinely moving." He said of Castle-Hughes: "This is a movie star." Ebert later went on to name it as one of the ten best films of 2003. The Los Angeles Times's Kenneth Turan praised Caro for her "willingness to let this story tell itself in its own time and the ability to create emotion that is intense without being cloying or dishonest." Claudia Puig of USA Today gave the film three-and-a-half out of four stars and praised Castle-Hughes' acting, saying "so effectively does she convey her pained confusion through subtle vocal cues, tentative stance and expressive dark eyes."

The film has also been discussed and praised widely within academia. Anthropologist A. Asbjørn Jøn discussed a range of Māori tribal traditions that resonate within the film, while noting links between the release of Whale Rider and increases in both New Zealand's whale watching tourism industry and conservation efforts.

=== Box office ===
Whale Rider grossed US$41 million worldwide.

=== Awards ===
The film won a number of international film-festival awards, including:

- the Toronto International Film Festival's AGF Peoples Choice award in September 2002
- the World Cinema Audience award at the January 2003 Sundance Film Festival in the United States
- the Canal Plus Award at the January 2003 Rotterdam Film Festival.

At the age of 13, Keisha Castle-Hughes was nominated for the Academy Award for Best Actress for her performance, becoming the youngest actress ever nominated for the award at that time (breaking Isabelle Adjani's record at the age of 20). She held the record until 2012 when Quvenzhané Wallis (at the age of 9) was nominated for that category for the film Beasts of the Southern Wild.

Academy Awards:

- Best Actress (Keisha Castle-Hughes, lost to Charlize Theron for Monster)

Chicago Film Critics Association:

- Best Actress (Keisha Castle-Hughes, lost to Charlize Theron for Monster)
- Most Promising Filmmaker (Niki Caro, lost to Shari Springer Berman and Robert Pulcini for American Splendor)
- Most Promising Performer (Keisha Castle-Hughes, winner)

Image Awards:

- Best Actress (Keisha Castle-Hughes, lost to Queen Latifah for Bringing Down the House)
- Best Film (lost to The Fighting Temptations)

Independent Spirit Awards:

- Best Foreign Film (winner)

New Zealand Film Awards:

- Best Film
- Best Director (Niki Caro)
- Best Actress (Keisha Castle-Hughes)
- Best Supporting Actor (Cliff Curtis)
- Best Supporting Actress (Vicky Haughton)
- Best Juvenile Performer (Mana Taumanu)
- Best Screenplay (Niki Caro)
- Best Original Score (Lisa Gerrard)
- Best Costume Design (Kirsty Cameron)

Satellite Awards

- Best Art Direction (lost to The Lord of the Rings: The Return of the King)
- Best Director (Niki Caro, lost to Jim Sheridan for In America)
- Best Film – Drama (lost to In America)
- Best Screenplay – Adapted (Niki Caro, lost to Brian Helgeland for Mystic River)

Screen Actors Guild:

- Best Supporting Actress (Keisha Castle-Hughes, lost to Renée Zellweger for Cold Mountain)

Washington D.C. Area Film Critics Association:

- Best Actress (Keisha Castle-Hughes, lost to Naomi Watts for 21 Grams)

== Legacy ==
Whale Rider has been pointed to have presumably influenced Walt Disney Animation Studios' animated film Moana which also involved Rachel House as a voice actress. Niki Caro later directed the 2020 Disney film Mulan.

== Documentaries ==
New Zealand filmmaker Jonathan Brough made the documentary film Riding the Wave: The Whale Rider Story, as well as short documentary clips about Whale Rider, to accompany the DVD.

== Soundtrack ==
The film contains music by Lisa Gerrard, released on the album Whalerider on 7 July 2003.

Other songs heard in the film include:

- Bar One (International Observer) Loaded Sounds – International Observer
- Kaikoura Dub – Pitch Black
- U Want Beef – Deceptikonz
- Voice / Percussion Loop – Hirini Melbourne and Richard Nunns from Te Ku Te Whe
- Just Passing Through – Nick Theobald
