= Niki Caro =

New Zealand director (born 1966)

Niki Caro MNZM
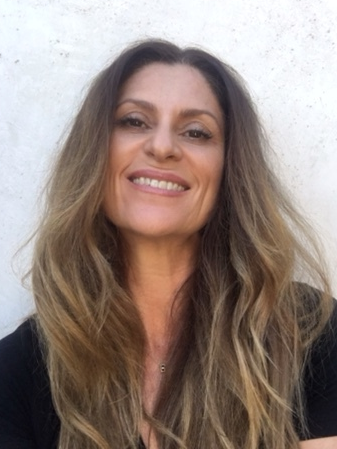
- Caro in 2017
- Born: Nikola Jean Caro; 20 September 1966 (age 60); Wellington, New Zealand
- Education: University of Auckland; Swinburne University of Technology
- Occupations: Director; producer; screenwriter
- Years active: 1984–present
- Notable work: Whale Rider; North Country; The Vintner's Luck; McFarland, USA; The Zookeeper's Wife; Mulan; The Mother
- Spouse: Andrew Lister
- Children: 2

Nikola Jean Caro MNZM (born 20 September 1966) is a New Zealand director and screenwriter. Her film Whale Rider (2002) was critically praised and won a number of awards at international film festivals. She directed the 2020 live action remake of Disney's Mulan, making her the second woman and the second New Zealand director hired by Disney to direct a film budgeted at over $100 million. Caro's works ranged from music videos, commercials, television dramas, and films, etc.

== Early life ==
Caro was born in Wellington, New Zealand. She attended Kadimah College Jewish Primary School, Auckland, then Diocesan School for Girls, where she received an alumni award. Caro graduated with a BFA from the Elam School of Fine Arts at the University of Auckland in 1988 and received a Postgraduate Diploma in Film from the Swinburne University of Technology in Melbourne, Victoria, Australia.

== Career ==
=== Early career ===
Caro first found interest in working with metal sculptures, but later turned her interests toward film. She did not receive any formal training in the field, but instead began by reading narrative film books and writing rough drafts for scripts. Caro's mother would type her handwritten drafts after she finished writing each one.

Caro's first experience in directing was when she was hired to create commercials for different companies such as the New Zealand Land Transport Safety Authority, Nike and Tower Insurance, but it was only after being signed by a production company to write and direct for the television series, Another Country that she had her first breakthrough. She did not have any experience in directing, but it felt it was instinctual once she started working with the actors.

Caro's work also includes short films, an award-nominated episode of Kiwi TV series Jackson's Wharf, and a number of music videos — including an award-winning interpretation of Straitjacket Fits single "Bad Note for a Heart" which was later judged Best Music Video at the 1990 New Zealand Music Awards.

Her focus then turned into TV dramas after producer Owen Hughes invited her to contribute to a trilogy of half-hour TV dramas in 1992. The Summer the Queen Came, which was contributed by Caro, earned three nominations at the 1994 NZ Film and Television Awards. Notably, Caro's other works: Sure To Rise and Lemming Aid were selected to compete at the Cannes Film Festival in France.

Caro's earlier works were intentionally depicting women's search for life goals, relationships, and desires. Her acclaimed drama Plain Tastes was about a middle-class woman searching for the ultimate happiness and love and was nominated for "Best Television Drama" and "Best Writer" at the 1996 NZ Film and Television Awards.

Along with her productions of television dramas, she has also made documentaries, including her short film Old Bastards (1994) and Footage (1996), "that seemed at times to have been infected by fiction."

=== Memory & Desire ===
Caro's first feature film, Memory & Desire, was meant to be a showcase of New Zealand's culture and lifestyle (aligning with the start of the 100% Pure New Zealand tourism campaign by the New Zealand tourism section of the government), but it fell short; seeing disappointing results at the box office and mixed international reviews. This was especially true in Japan, where the film was deemed to have not captured the essence of Japanese culture, despite its attempts to evoke money and consult from possible Japanese investors. The film is meant to use landscapes to juxtapose the characters and their origins. The calm and relaxed outdoor setting of New Zealand is meant to oppose the hustle and bustle of the big, busy city of Tokyo. It works twofold because the contrast also works for the comparison of the "civilized" parts of New Zealand against the wild outdoors, showing off the two different sections of the country in an effort to advertise to multiple groups of people considering visiting the country. The tourism board looked to use landscapes as the most enticing factor in a tourist's eyes, along with people, adventure and culture. The film shows evidence of this by implying that Keiji and Sayo are unable to consummate their marriage anywhere but in the outdoors due to Keiji being unable to achieve an erection in an urban setting, emphasizing the "natural" state of humanism of being connected to the surrounding landscapes. Along the couple's trip they encounter different New Zealand tourist hotspots such as; the Museum of Technology and Rotorua's spa pools on the West Coast Beach. It is also in contrast of the bland hotel rooms that the couple stay in; as if to say that the only time they are truly free is when they are outside in nature, specifically New Zealand's nature.

It was chosen for Critics' Week at Cannes week in 1998. In 1999 the film was voted best new film at the New Zealand Film Awards.

=== Whale Rider ===
Caro went on to write and direct Whale Rider, which is about a Māori girl that has to stand up against her grandfather and the other men in the tribe to show she can be as much of a leader as the boys who were being trained to be leaders. This film is the reproduction of the book Whale Rider, while according to the author Witi Ihimaera, this book is the one "that the Māori community accepts best, and a response to the Katherine Mansfield centenary celebrations which rewrites her stories from a Māori perspective." However, in order to strengthen her idea on women development and bringing out women's position in the society, Caro intelligently modified this retelling of a Maori legend.

Caro argues that Whale Rider is more about leadership than sexism because the Māori are also profoundly matriarchal. Caro says there is a Māori saying that "women lead from behind". She directed thirteen-year-old Keisha Castle-Hughes to a performance nominated for an Oscar for Best Actress. The film had a budget of $2 million, which is considered small for a major film, but it was still considered to be a good interpretation of the indigenous story that it was trying to interpret and demonstrate. Whale Rider would also go on to become New Zealand's most financially successful film and either the film, or Caro herself, would win or be nominated for over 50 different awards by different, international film festivals.

=== North Country ===
With the success of Whale Rider under her belt, Caro was chosen to direct her first Hollywood film, North Country (2005), starring Charlize Theron. [article] This is another story of a female being told things she couldn't manage due to gender stereotypes. Pointing to the sexual harassment issues existing in the workplace, Caro was inspired by a landmark American court case in which the a woman in a remote mining town dares to stand up against major forces. The role played by Charlize Theron, Josey Aimes, is based on Lois Jenson, who endured thirteen years of harassment before filing her first lawsuit, which was known as Jenson v. Eveleth Taconite Co. Based on this true story and the previous book "Class Action: The Story of Lois Jensen and the Landmark Case That Changed Sexual Harassment Law", Caro challenged herself to make this piece of work with intentions in presenting women's journey of feminist equality. Caro argued that despite being warned about the challenges of working with a Hollywood studio as a female filmmaker calling for women's rights, funders Warner Brothers "couldn't have been more respectful of my creative choices". It was later nominated for Best Actress for lead and supporting role at the Oscars, and also was nominated for a Golden Globe.

=== Subsequent projects ===
After doing North Country, Caro went back to New Zealand to write and direct the feature film The Vintner's Luck (2009), which is about a peasant winemaker who sets out to make the perfect vintage wine. The film reunited her with her Whale Rider star Keisha Castle-Hughes.

Caro directed McFarland, USA starring Kevin Costner. It was released in February 2015 and has received a critical success. Caro will also be writing and directing the biographical film Callas, about the famous opera singer Maria Callas and her relationship with billionaire Aristotle Onassis.

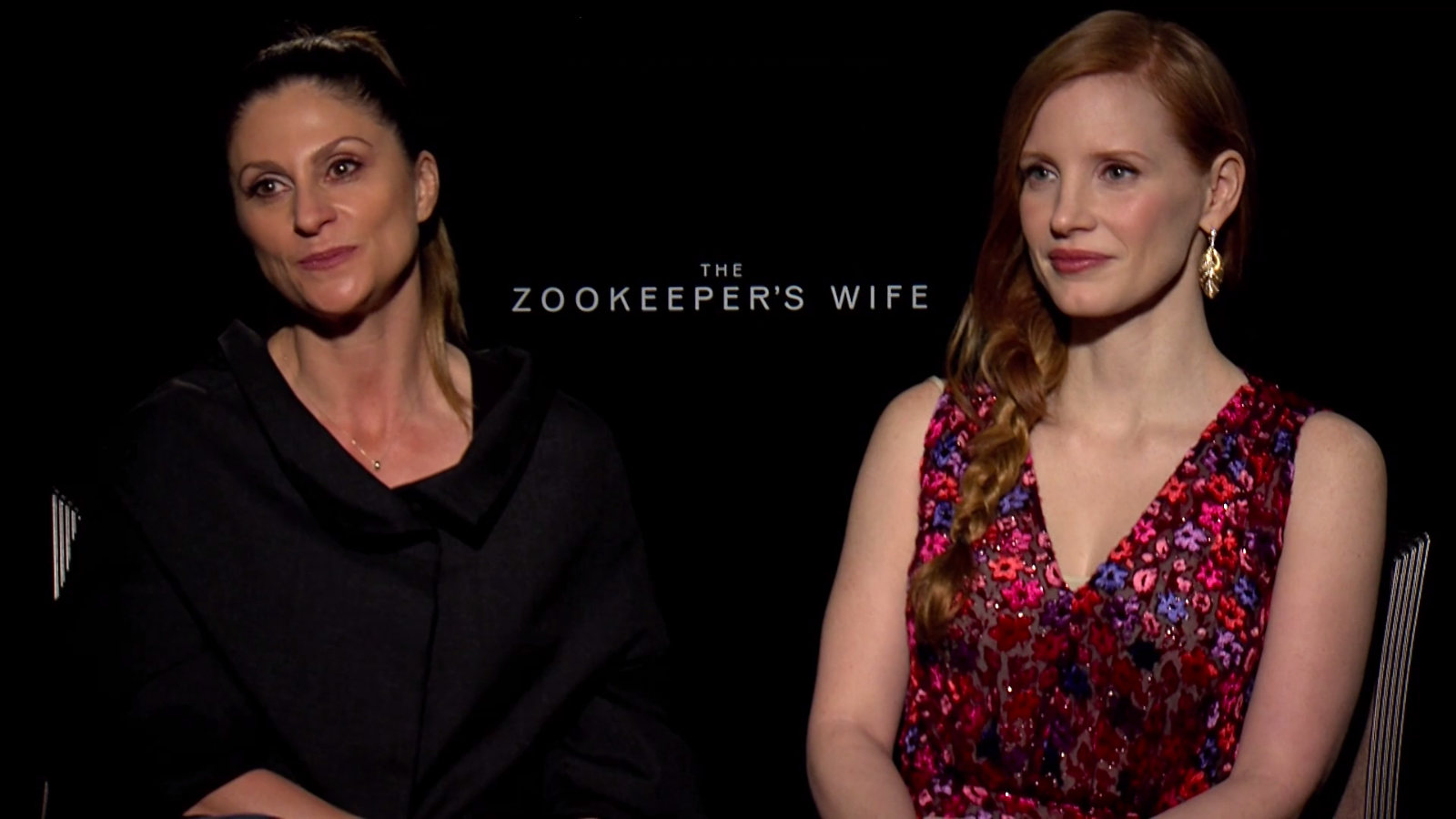
Niki Caro and Jessica Chastain for The Zookeeper's Wife

In 2013, Caro planned to direct the film adaptation of The Zookeeper's Wife, based on Diane Ackerman's non-fiction book. It was released in 2017 and received generally mixed to positive reviews. In an interview with FF2 Media, Caro states that "female sexuality from a female's point of view is rather under-explored in cinema" and so felt it necessary to include such a perspective in her film.

The Zookeeper's Wife recounts the true story of the couple, Jan and Antonina Żabiński, who secretly sheltered Jews during the German invasion of Poland from 1939 to 1945 on their premises of the Warsaw Zoo. The original composition of this writing piece was imbued with female's energetic contributions, mainly created by the female author, Diane Ackerman, and other female artists. Furthermore, with a script by "Snow Flower and the Secret Fan" scribe Angela Workman, Caro tended to bring out female's significant position and fill the gender gap even further. "Along with Caro, Workman and Ackerman, "The Zookeeper's Wife" features a slew of female producers (Diane Levin, Kim Zubick and Katie McNeill), a female camera operator (Rachael Levine), a female stunt coordinator (Antje "Angie" Rau), a female production designer (Suzie Davies), a female set decorator (Charlotte Watts) and that's just the start." Caro claimed that she didn't meant to create a "big conspiracy of women", but only hired all best people assigning to different roles in the production of The Zookeeper's Wife, while they intuitively are best fits for the various positions.

In 2016, Marvel Studios had decided to hire a female filmmaker to direct Captain Marvel, while Caro was one of the contenders with Jennifer Kent.In February 2017, Caro was hired to direct Disney's live-action adaptation of Mulan, which was released in 2020, to generally positive reviews. Mulan was nominated by the 46th Saturn Award for Best Director. She became the second woman at the studio to direct a film budgeted at over $100 million, after Ava DuVernay (2018's A Wrinkle in Time), and the second New Zealander, after Taika Waititi (2017's Thor: Ragnarok).

== Personal life ==
Caro is married to architect Andrew Lister, and they have two daughters, Tui and Pearl. Their first daughter was born shortly after the release of Whale Rider. Because Caro was pregnant, she was unable to attend any of the premieres for the film. Caro said she was sad, but at the same time thought it may not be such a bad thing because success in America is so radical.

== Filmography ==
=== Film ===
Year	Title	Director	Writer	Producer
1998	Memory & Desire	Yes	Yes	No
2002	Whale Rider	Yes	Yes	No
2005	North Country	Yes	No	No
2009	The Vintner's Luck	Yes	Yes	Yes
2015	McFarland, USA	Yes	No	No
2017	The Zookeeper's Wife	Yes	No	No
2020	Mulan	Yes	No	No
2023	The Mother	Yes	No	No

=== Television ===
Year	Title	Director	Writer	Notes
2001–2002	Mercy Peak	Yes	Yes	5 episodes
2017	Anne with an E	Yes	No	Episode "Your Will Shall Decide Your Destiny"

=== Music videos ===
Year	Title	Artist	Notes
2020	"Loyal Brave True"	Christina Aguilera	For Walt Disney Pictures' live-action feature film Mulan
2020	"El Mejor Guerrero"	Christina Aguilera	For Walt Disney Pictures' live-action feature film Mulan; Spanish-language version of "Loyal Brave True"
2020	"Reflection"	Christina Aguilera	For Walt Disney Pictures' live-action feature film Mulan
2020	"Wierna, odważna i prawa"	Zuza Jabłońska	For Walt Disney Pictures' live-action feature film Mulan; Polish-language version of "Loyal Brave True"

== Awards and recognition ==
- Caro was appointed a Member of the New Zealand Order of Merit for services to the film industry in the 2004 New Year Honours.
- Caro was one of the honorees for Ms. Magazine's 10 women of the year in 2003
- Whale Rider received Best Feature Film for British Academy Children's Awards
- Whale Rider received People's Choice Award for Toronto International Film Festival(TIFF) in 2002.
- Caro's film Memory & Desire was nominated for Best Film and Best Screenplay Adaptation at the Nokia New Zealand Film Awards, 1999.
- Her film, Memory & Desire won a Special Jury Prize at the New Zealand Film and Television Awards
- The television series Jackson's Wharf received the Best Drama Script award for at the TV Guide Television Awards, 1999.
- Caro's film Memory & Desire was selected for Critics' Week at the Cannes Film Festival, 1998
- Caro's television documentary Footage was selected for the Venice Film Festival, 1996
- Caro's short for Sure to Rise was nominated for the Palme d'Or Award at the Cannes Film Festival, 1994
- Caro was nominated for Best Director and Best Writer at the NZ Film and Television Awards (1994) for The Summer the Queen Came
- Won Best Video at NZ Music Awards (1990) for Bad Note for a Heart

== See also ==
- List of female film and television directors
- Women's cinema
- Feminist film theory
