= List of awards and nominations received by Taika Waititi =

Taika Waititi awards and nominations
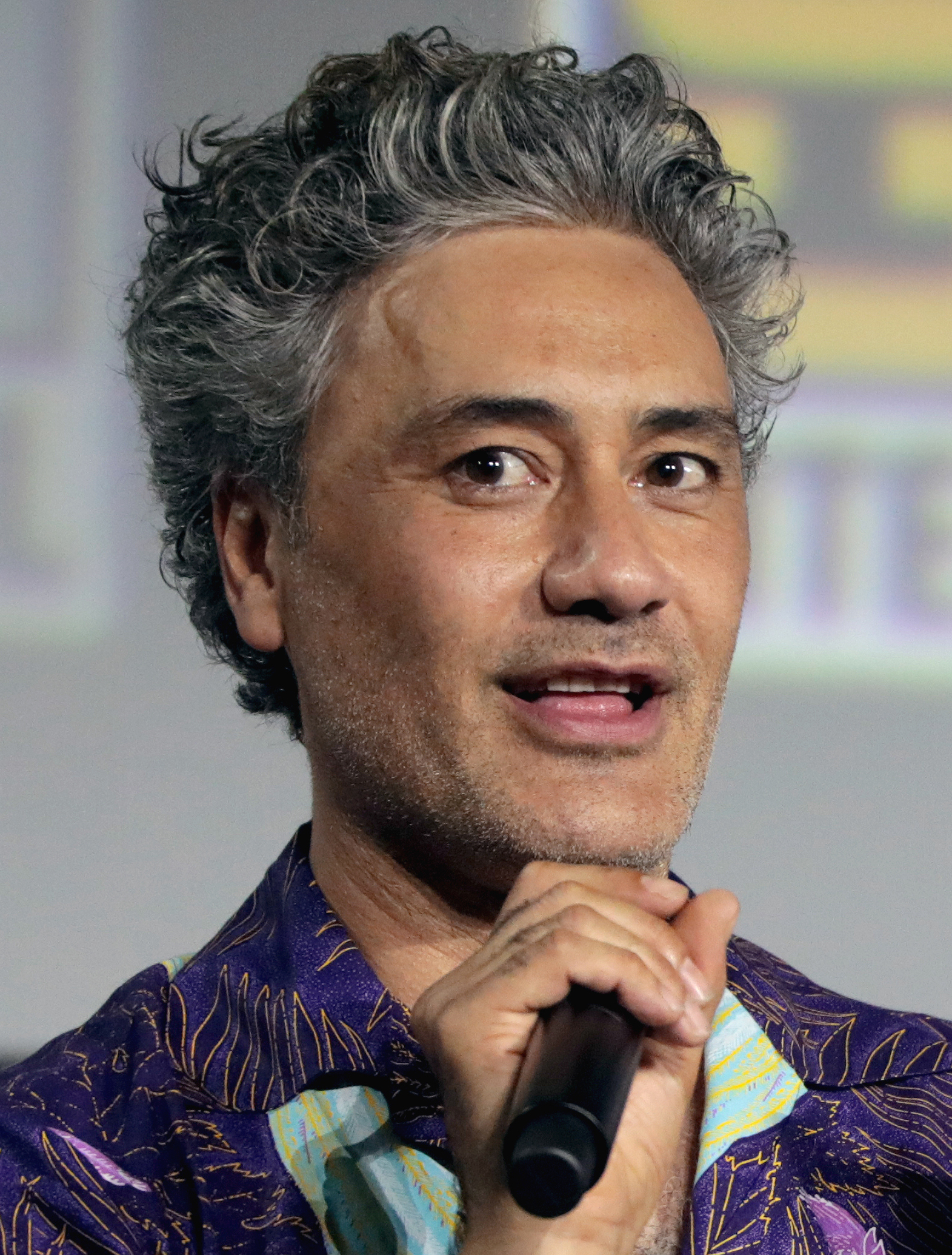
- Waititi at the 2019 San Diego Comic-Con
Awards and nominations
Award	Wins	Nominations
Academy Awards	1	3
Actor Awards	0	1
BAFTA Awards	1	1
Critics' Choice Awards	0	14
Directors Guild of America Awards	0	2
Emmy Awards	0	6
Golden Globe Awards	0	2
Grammy Awards	1	1
Producers Guild of America Awards	1	3
Writers Guild of America Awards	1	6

Totals (Note: Certain award groups do not simply award one winner. They acknowledge several different recipients, have runners-up, and have third place. Since this is a specific recognition and is different from losing an award, runner-up mentions are considered wins in this award tally. For simplification and to avoid errors, each award in this list has been presumed to have had a prior nomination.)
- Wins: 159
- Nominations: 375

New Zealand filmmaker, actor, and comedian Taika Waititi is the recipient of various awards and nominations, including an Academy Award, a British Academy Film Award, a Grammy Award, a Writers Guild of America Award, and nominations for two Golden Globe Awards and six Primetime Emmy Awards, among others.

In 2005, Waititi received a nomination for the Academy Award for Best Live Action Short Film for the short film Two Cars, One Night (2004). In 2019, he released the comedy-drama film Jojo Rabbit, which was met with critical acclaim and earned him the Academy Award, the BAFTA Award, and the WGA Award, all for Best Adapted Screenplay, in addition to nominations for the Academy Award for Best Picture, the Golden Globe Award for Best Musical or Comedy Film and the Directors Guild of America Award for Outstanding Directing in a Feature Film.

Since 2019, he has produced the television series What We Do in the Shadows, based on the 2014 film of the same name, for which he was nominated for the Primetime Emmy Award for Outstanding Comedy Series and the Writers Guild of America Award for Best New Series.

== Major awards ==
=== Academy Awards ===
Year	Category	Nominated work	Result	Ref.
2005	Best Live Action Short Film	Two Cars, One Night	Nominated	
2020	Best Picture	Jojo Rabbit	Nominated	
2020	Best Adapted Screenplay	Jojo Rabbit	Won	

=== Actor Awards ===
Year	Category	Nominated work	Result	Ref.
2020	Outstanding Performance by a Cast in a Motion Picture	Jojo Rabbit	Nominated	

=== BAFTA Awards ===
Year	Category	Nominated work	Result	Ref.
British Academy Film Awards
2020	Best Adapted Screenplay	Jojo Rabbit	Won	

=== Critics' Choice Awards ===
Year	Category	Nominated work	Result	Ref.
Critics' Choice Movie Awards
2018	Best Action Movie	Thor: Ragnarok	Nominated	
2020	Best Picture	Jojo Rabbit	Nominated	
2020	Best Comedy	Jojo Rabbit	Nominated	
2020	Best Adapted Screenplay	Jojo Rabbit	Nominated	
Critics' Choice Television Awards
2021	Best Comedy Series	What We Do in the Shadows	Nominated	
2022	Best Comedy Series	Reservation Dogs	Nominated	
2022	Best Comedy Series	What We Do in the Shadows	Nominated	
2023	Best Comedy Series	Reservation Dogs	Nominated	
2024	Best Comedy Series	Reservation Dogs	Nominated	
2024	Best Comedy Series	What We Do in the Shadows	Nominated	
Critics' Choice Super Awards
2021	Best Science Fiction/Fantasy Series	What We Do in the Shadows	Nominated	
2023	Best Horror Series	What We Do in the Shadows	Nominated	
2024	Best Horror Series	What We Do in the Shadows	Nominated	
2025	Best Horror Series	What We Do in the Shadows	Nominated	

=== Directors Guild of America Awards ===
Year	Category	Nominated work	Result	Ref.
2020	Outstanding Directing – Feature Film	Jojo Rabbit	Nominated	
2021	Outstanding Directing – Commercials	"The Letter" (for Coca-Cola)	Nominated	

=== Emmy Awards ===
Year	Category	Nominated work	Result	Ref.
Primetime Emmy Awards
2020	Outstanding Character Voice-Over Performance	The Mandalorian	Nominated	
2020	Outstanding Comedy Series	What We Do in the Shadows	Nominated	
2022	Outstanding Comedy Series	What We Do in the Shadows	Nominated	
2024	Outstanding Comedy Series	What We Do in the Shadows	Nominated	
2024	Outstanding Comedy Series	Reservation Dogs	Nominated	
2025	Outstanding Comedy Series	What We Do in the Shadows	Nominated	

=== Golden Globe Awards ===
Year	Category	Nominated work	Result	Ref.
2020	Best Motion Picture – Musical or Comedy	Jojo Rabbit	Nominated	
2022	Best Television Series – Musical or Comedy	Reservation Dogs	Nominated	

=== Grammy Awards ===
Year	Category	Nominated work	Result	Ref.
2021	Best Compilation Soundtrack for Visual Media	Jojo Rabbit	Won	

=== Producers Guild of America Awards ===
Year	Category	Nominated work	Result	Ref.
2020	Outstanding Producer of Theatrical Motion Picture	Jojo Rabbit	Nominated	
2021	Outstanding Producer of Episodic Comedy Television	What We Do in the Shadows	Nominated	
2025	Norman Lear Achievement Award in Television	—N/a	Won	

=== Writers Guild of America Awards ===
Year	Category	Nominated work	Result	Ref.
2008	Best New Series	Flight of the Conchords	Nominated	
2008	Best Comedy Series	Flight of the Conchords	Nominated	
2020	Best Adapted Screenplay	Jojo Rabbit	Won	
2020	Best New Series	What We Do in the Shadows	Nominated	
2022	Best New Series	Reservation Dogs	Nominated	
2022	Episodic Comedy	Reservation Dogs (for "Fuckin' Rez Dogs" episode)	Nominated	

== Miscellaneous awards ==
Award	Year	Category	Work	Result	Ref(s)
AACTA Awards	2020	Best Screenplay	Jojo Rabbit	Won	
AACTA Awards	2021	Best Comedy Series	What We Do in the Shadows	Nominated	
AFI Fest	2004	Grand Jury Prize for Best International Short Film	Two Cars, One Night	Won	
AFI Fest	2010	Audience Award for Best International Feature Film	Boy	Won	
Ajyal Film Festival	2016	Best Film (Mohaq Section)	Hunt for the Wilderpeople	Nominated	
Alliance of Women Film Journalists	2019	Best Film	Jojo Rabbit	Nominated	
Alliance of Women Film Journalists	2019	Best Screenplay, Adapted	Jojo Rabbit	Nominated	
American Film Institute Awards	2019	Top 10 Films of the Year	Jojo Rabbit	Won (Note: This award does not have a single winner, it recognizes multiple films.)	
American Film Institute Awards	2021	Top 10 Television Programs of the Year	Reservation Dogs	Won (Note: This award does not have a single winner, it recognizes multiple television programs.)	
American Film Institute Awards	2022	Top 10 Television Programs of the Year	Reservation Dogs	Won	
American Film Institute Awards	2023	Top 10 Television Programs of the Year	Reservation Dogs	Won	
Amiens International Film Festival	2004	Best Short Film	Two Cars, One Night	Won	
Amiens International Film Festival	2004	Best Short Film — Audience Award	Two Cars, One Night	Won	
Asia Pacific Screen Awards	2010	Best Children's Feature Film	Boy	Nominated	
Aspen Filmfest	2019	Audience Award — Special Mention	Jojo Rabbit	Won	
Aspen Shortsfest	2004	Best Drama — Jury Award	Two Cars, One Night	Won	
Aspen Shortsfest	2005	The Ellen — Distinctive Achievement	Tama Tū	Won	
Austin Film Critics Association	2019	Best Film	Jojo Rabbit	Nominated	
Austin Film Critics Association	2019	Best Adapted Screenplay	Jojo Rabbit	Nominated	
Australasian Writers and Art Directors Association	2014	Film and Video (Television Commercials – Over 30 seconds) — Gold Pencil	"Blazed" (for NZ Transport Agency)	Won	
Australasian Writers and Art Directors Association	2015	Film and Video (Interactive Film, Individual) — Gold Pencil	"TinnyVision" (for NZ Transport Agency)	Won	
Awards Circuit Community Awards	2014	Best Motion Picture	Jojo Rabbit	Nominated	
Awards Circuit Community Awards	2014	Best Adapted Screenplay	Jojo Rabbit	Nominated	
Bali International Film Festival	2016	Audience Choice: Best Overall Film	Hunt for the Wilderpeople	Won	
Belgian Film Critics Association	2020	Grand Prix	Jojo Rabbit	Nominated	
Berlin International Film Festival	2004	Panorama Short Film Award	Two Cars, One Night	Won	
Berlin International Film Festival	2005	Panorama Special Jury Short Film Award	Tama Tū	Won	
Berlin International Film Festival	2010	Grand Prix of the Deutsche Kinderhilfswerk for Best Feature Film	Boy	Won	
Berlin International Film Festival	2014	Crystal Bear for Best Film (Generation 14plus section)	What We Do in the Shadows	Nominated	
Billy T Award	1999	Comedy Award	Humourbeasts (Taika Waititi and Jemaine Clement)	Won	
Bodil Awards	2019	Best American Film	Jojo Rabbit	Nominated	
Bram Stoker Awards	2015	Best Screenplay	What We Do in the Shadows	Nominated	
British Academy Film Awards	2020	Best Adapted Screenplay	Jojo Rabbit	Won	
British Animation Awards	2022	Best Voice Performance	Save Ralph	Nominated	
British Arrows	2020	Arrows Bronze — Food & Non-Alcoholic Drinks	"No Can Left Behind" (for PepsiCo)	Won	
British Arrows	2023	Arrows Silver — Alcoholic Drinks	"Belvedere Presents Daniel Craig" (for Belvedere Vodka)	Won	
British Independent Film Awards	2016	Best International Independent Film	Hunt for the Wilderpeople	Nominated	
Calgary Underground Film Festival	2016	Audience Award for Best Narrative Feature	Hunt for the Wilderpeople	Won	
Camerimage	2023	Best Music Video	"Praising You"	Nominated	
Cannes Lions	2014	Direction — Silver Lion	"Blazed" (for NZ Transport Agency)	Won	
Cannes Lions	2015	Fiction Online Series — Gold Lion	"TinnyVision" (for NZ Transport Agency)	Won	
Celluloid Screams: Sheffield Horror Film Festival	2014	Best Feature	What We Do in the Shadows	Won	
Chicago Film Critics Association	2019	Best Adapted Screenplay	Jojo Rabbit	Nominated	
Chicago Indie Critics	2019	Best Independent Film (budget under $20 million)	Jojo Rabbit	Nominated	
Chicago Indie Critics	2019	Best Adapted Screenplay	Jojo Rabbit	Nominated	
Chicago Indie Critics	2019	Trailblazer Award	Taika Waititi	Nominated	
Chlotrudis Awards	2016	Best Original Screenplay	What We Do in the Shadows	Nominated	
Chlotrudis Awards	2016	Best Performance by an Ensemble Cast	What We Do in the Shadows	Nominated	
Cinekid Festival	2010	Lion Jury Prize	Boy	Won	
Cinekid Festival	2010	MovieSquad Cinekid Award	Boy	Won	
Cinema for Peace Awards	2020	The Most Valuable Film of the Year	Jojo Rabbit	Nominated	
CinEuphoria Awards	2021	Best Film - International Competition	Jojo Rabbit	Won	
CinEuphoria Awards	2021	Best Screenplay - International Competition	Jojo Rabbit	Nominated	
CinEuphoria Awards	2021	Best Director - International Competition	Jojo Rabbit	Nominated	
CinEuphoria Awards	2021	Best Supporting Actor - International Competition	Jojo Rabbit	Nominated	
CinEuphoria Awards	2021	Best Duo - International Competition	Jojo Rabbit	Nominated	
CinEuphoria Awards	2021	Best Ensemble - International Competition	Jojo Rabbit	Won	
CinEuphoria Awards	2021	Best Sequence - International Competition	Jojo Rabbit	Won	
CinEuphoria Awards	2021	Top Ten of the Year - International Competition	Jojo Rabbit	Won	
Clio Awards	2014	Direction — Silver	"Blazed" (for NZ Transport Agency)	Won	
Clio Awards	2015	Film — Silver	"TinnyVision" (for NZ Transport Agency)	Won	
Columbus Film Critics Association	2020	Best Film	Jojo Rabbit	Nominated	
Columbus Film Critics Association	2020	Best Adapted Screenplay	Jojo Rabbit	Nominated	
Commercial Communications Council — AXIS Awards	2014	Grand Axis	"Blazed" (for NZ Transport Agency)	Won	
Commercial Communications Council — AXIS Awards	2014	Grand Prix — Screen Content	"Blazed" (for NZ Transport Agency)	Won	
Commercial Communications Council — AXIS Awards	2014	Craft Grand Prix — Direction	"Blazed" (for NZ Transport Agency)	Won	
Cork International Film Festival	2019	Audience Award for Best Film	Jojo Rabbit	Nominated	
Creative Circle Awards	2023	Best Direction — Silver	"Belvedere Presents Daniel Craig" (for Belvedere)	Won	
D&AD Awards	2014	Film Advertising Crafts (Direction for Film Advertising) — Wood Pencil	"Blazed" (for NZ Transport Agency)	Won	
D&AD Awards	2014	TV & Cinema Advertising (TV Commercials 61-120 seconds) — Graphite Pencil	"Blazed" (for NZ Transport Agency)	Won	
D&AD Awards	2015	Tactical Branded Film Content & Entertainment — Wood Pencil	"The Most Epic Safety Video Ever" (for Air New Zealand)	Won	
D&AD Awards	2015	Branded Film Content & Entertainment (Online) — Wood Pencil	"TinnyVision" (for NZ Transport Agency)	Won	
Dallas–Fort Worth Film Critics Association	2019	Best Film	Jojo Rabbit	Nominated	
David di Donatello Awards	2021	Best Foreign Film	Jojo Rabbit	Nominated	
deadCenter Film Festival	2016	Best Feature	Hunt for the Wilderpeople	Won	
Denver Film Critics Society	2016	Best Comedy Film	What We Do in the Shadows	Won	
Denver Film Critics Society	2017	Best Comedy Film	Hunt for the Wilderpeople	Nominated	
Denver Film Critics Society	2018	Best Comedy Film	Thor: Ragnarok	Nominated	
Denver Film Critics Society	2020	Best Picture	Jojo Rabbit	Nominated	
Denver Film Critics Society	2020	Best Comedy Film	Jojo Rabbit	Won	
Denver Film Critics Society	2020	Best Adapted Screenplay	Jojo Rabbit	Nominated	
Denver Film Critics Society	2020	Best Director	Jojo Rabbit	Nominated	
Detroit Film Critics Society	2019	Best Film	Jojo Rabbit	Nominated	
Detroit Film Critics Society	2019	Best Director	Jojo Rabbit	Nominated	
DiscussingFilm Critic Awards	2019	Best Adapted Screenplay	Jojo Rabbit	Nominated	
Dorian Awards	2019	Wilde Wit of the Year	Taika Waititi	Nominated	
Dorian Awards	2020	Best TV Comedy	What We Do in the Shadows	Nominated	
Dorian Awards	2020	Best Unsung TV Show	What We Do in the Shadows	Won	
Dorian Awards	2022	Best TV Comedy	Our Flag Means Death	Nominated	
Dorian Awards	2022	Best LGBTQ TV Show	Our Flag Means Death	Nominated	
Dorian Awards	2022	Best Unsung TV Show	Our Flag Means Death	Nominated	
Dorian Awards	2023	Best Unsung TV Show	Reservation Dogs	Nominated	
Dragon Awards	2018	Best Science Fiction or Fantasy Movie	Thor: Ragnarok	Nominated	
Edinburgh International Film Festival	2016	Best International Feature Film	Hunt for the Wilderpeople	Nominated	
Edinburgh International Film Festival	2016	Audience Award	Hunt for the Wilderpeople	Won	
Empire Awards	2017	Best Film	Hunt for the Wilderpeople	Nominated	
Empire Awards	2017	Best Comedy	Hunt for the Wilderpeople	Nominated	
Empire Awards	2017	Best Screenplay	Hunt for the Wilderpeople	Nominated	
Empire Awards	2017	Best Director	Hunt for the Wilderpeople	Nominated	
Empire Awards	2018	Best Film	Thor: Ragnarok	Nominated	
Empire Awards	2018	Best Sci-Fi/Fantasy	Thor: Ragnarok	Nominated	
Empire Awards	2018	Best Director	Thor: Ragnarok	Nominated	
Fangoria Chainsaw Awards	2016	Best Screenplay	What We Do in the Shadows	Won	
Fangoria Chainsaw Awards	2016	Best Limited-Release/Direct-to-Video Film	What We Do in the Shadows	Won	
Fangoria Chainsaw Awards	2021	Best Series	What We Do in the Shadows (TV series)	Won	
Fangoria Chainsaw Awards	2023	Best Series	What We Do in the Shadows (TV series)	Nominated	
Fantasia International Film Festival	2016	Audience Award: Best European / North-South American Feature	Hunt for the Wilderpeople	Won	
Fantaspoa International Fantastic Film Festival	2015	Artistic Contribution - International Film (Honorable Mention)	What We Do in the Shadows	Won	
Fantastic Fest	2019	Audience Award	Jojo Rabbit	Nominated	
Flickerfest International Short Film Festival	2006	Coopers Award for Best Film	Tama Tū	Won	
Florida Film Critics Circle	2019	Best Adapted Screenplay	Jojo Rabbit	Nominated	
Galway Film Fleadh	2016	Best International Film	Hunt for the Wilderpeople	Won	
Georgia Film Critics Association	2019	Best Adapted Screenplay	Jojo Rabbit	Nominated	
GLAAD Media Awards	2023	Outstanding Comedy Series	What We Do in the Shadows	Won	
GLAAD Media Awards	2023	Outstanding New TV Series	Our Flag Means Death	Nominated	
GLAAD Media Awards	2024	Outstanding Comedy Series	What We Do in the Shadows	Nominated	
GLAAD Media Awards	2024	Outstanding Comedy Series	Our Flag Means Death	Nominated	
GLAAD Media Awards	2024	Outstanding Film – Streaming or TV	Frybread Face and Me	Nominated	
Gold Derby Awards	2020	Motion Picture	Jojo Rabbit	Nominated	
Gold Derby Awards	2020	Adapted Screenplay	Jojo Rabbit	Nominated	
Gold Derby Awards	2020	Adapted Screenplay of the Decade	Jojo Rabbit	Nominated	
Gold Derby Awards	2020	Comedy Series	What We Do in the Shadows	Nominated	
Gold Derby Awards	2022	Performer of the Year	Taika Waititi	Nominated	
Gold Derby Awards	2022	Comedy Series	Reservation Dogs	Nominated	
Gold Derby Awards	2022	Comedy Series	Our Flag Means Death	Nominated	
Gold Derby Awards	2022	Comedy Series	What We Do in the Shadows	Nominated	
Gold Derby Awards	2022	Comedy Guest Actor	What We Do in the Shadows	Nominated	
Gold Derby Awards	2022	Comedy Supporting Actor	Our Flag Means Death	Nominated	
Gold Derby Awards	2022	Ensemble of the Year	Our Flag Means Death	Nominated	
Gold Derby Awards	2023	Comedy Series	Reservation Dogs	Nominated	
Golden Panda Awards	2023	Best Film	Jojo Rabbit	Won	
Gold List	2024	Best Adapted Screenplay	Next Goal Wins	Nominated	
Gotham Awards	2021	Breakthrough Series – Short Form	Reservation Dogs	Won	
Grande Prêmio do Cinema Brasileiro	2021	Best Foreign Film	Jojo Rabbit	Won	
Greater Western New York Film Critics Association	2019	Best Adapted Screenplay	Jojo Rabbit	Nominated	
Hamburg International Short Film Festival	2004	Short Film Award	Two Cars, One Night	Won	
Hawaii Film Critics Society	2020	Best Adapted Screenplay	Jojo Rabbit	Nominated	
Hawaii International Film Festival	2014	Best Narrative Feature — Audience Award	What We Do in the Shadows	Won	
Hawaii International Film Festival	2017	Trailblazer Award	Taika Waititi	Won	
Hermosillo International Film Festival	2016	Best International Feature Film	What we Do in the Shadows	Won	
Hollywood Critics Association	2020	Best Picture	Jojo Rabbit	Nominated	
Hollywood Critics Association	2020	Best Adapted Screenplay	Jojo Rabbit	Won	
Hollywood Critics Association	2020	Best Male Director	Jojo Rabbit	Nominated	
Hollywood Critics Association Midseason Awards	2020	Best Cable Network Series (New or Recurring)	What We Do in the Shadows	Won	
Hollywood Critics Association TV Awards	2022	Best Streaming Series, Comedy	Reservation Dogs	Nominated	
Hollywood Critics Association TV Awards	2022	Best Writing in a Streaming Series, Comedy	Reservation Dogs (for "Fuckin' Rez Dogs" episode)	Nominated	
Hollywood Critics Association TV Awards	2022	Best Directing in a Streaming Series, Comedy	Our Flag Means Death (for "Pilot" episode)	Nominated	
Hollywood Critics Association TV Awards	2022	Best Supporting Actor in a Streaming Series, Comedy	Our Flag Means Death	Nominated	
Hollywood Critics Association TV Awards	2022	Best Cable Series, Comedy	What We Do in the Shadows	Won	
Hollywood Critics Association TV Awards	2023	Best Cable Series, Comedy	What We Do in the Shadows	Nominated	
Houston Film Critics Society	2019	Best Picture	Jojo Rabbit	Nominated	
Hugo Awards	2018	Best Dramatic Presentation - Long Form	Thor: Ragnarok	Nominated	
Hugo Awards	2020	Best Dramatic Presentation - Short Form	The Mandalorian ("Chapter 8: Redemption")	Nominated	
Humanitas Prize	2020	Comedy Feature Film	Jojo Rabbit	Won	
ICG Publicists Awards	2022	Television Showmanship Award	Taika Waititi	Won	
IGN Awards	2017	Best Comedy Movie	Thor: Ragnarok	Won	
IGN Awards	2017	People's Choice Award: Best Comedy Movie	Thor: Ragnarok	Won	
IGN Awards	2019	Best Movie	Jojo Rabbit	Nominated	
IGN Awards	2019	Best TV Comedy Series	What We Do in the Shadows	Nominated	
imagineNATIVE Film + Media Arts Festival	2010	Jury Award for Best Dramatic Feature	Boy	Won	
Independent Film Festival Boston	2016	Audience Award for Best Narrative Feature	Hunt for the Wilderpeople	Won	
Independent Spirit Awards	2022	Best New Scripted Series	Reservation Dogs	Won	
Indiana Film Journalists Association	2019	Best Film	Jojo Rabbit	Nominated	
Indiana Film Journalists Association	2019	Best Adapted Screenplay	Jojo Rabbit	Nominated	
Indiana Film Journalists Association	2019	Best Director	Jojo Rabbit	Nominated	
Indiana Film Journalists Association	2019	Best Ensemble Acting	Jojo Rabbit	Nominated	
Indianapolis International Film Festival	2005	Grand Jury Prize for Best Short Film	Tama Tū	Won	
International Film Festival of India	2010	Special Jury Award	Boy	Won	
International Film Festival SCHLiNGEL	2016	Award of the Ecumenical Jury: Best International Feature Film	Hunt for the Wilderpeople	Won	
International Film Festival SCHLiNGEL	2016	Award of the Junior Jury: Best International Junior Feature Film	Hunt for the Wilderpeople	Won	
International Short Film Festival Oberhausen	2004	Prize of the Cinema Jury	Two Cars, One Night	Won	
Las Vegas Film Critics Society	2016	Best Family Film	Hunt for the Wilderpeople	Won	
Leeds International Film Festival	2014	Audience Award for Best Film	What We Do in the Shadows	Won	
Leeds International Film Festival	2019	Audience Award for Best Feature	Jojo Rabbit	Won	
Los Angeles Asian Pacific Film Festival	2005	New Directors/New Visions Award	Tama Tū	Won	
Melbourne International Film Festival	2004	Best Live Action Short Film	Two Cars, One Night	Won	
Melbourne International Film Festival	2005	Best Fiction Short Film	Tama Tū	Won	
Melbourne International Film Festival	2010	Audience Award	Boy	Won	
Melbourne International Film Festival	2014	People's Choice Award: Best Narrative Feature	What We Do in the Shadows	Nominated	
Miskolc International Film Festival	2016	Emeric Pressburger Prize	Hunt for the Wilderpeople	Nominated	
Montclair Film Festival	2016	Audience Award for Narrative Feature	Hunt for the Wilderpeople	Won	
Montréal Festival of New Cinema	2019	Temps Ø People's Choice Award	Jojo Rabbit	Nominated	
Movieguide Awards	2018	Best Film for Mature Audiences	Thor: Ragnarok	Nominated	
Music City Film Critics Association	2019	Best Film	Jojo Rabbit	Nominated	
Music City Film Critics Association	2019	Best Comedy Film	Jojo Rabbit	Nominated	
Music City Film Critics Association	2019	Best Screenplay	Jojo Rabbit	Nominated	
MTV Movie & TV Awards	2018	Scene Stealer	Thor: Ragnarok	Nominated	
National Board of Review	2019	Top Ten Films	Jojo Rabbit	Won	
National Geographic All Roads Film Festival	2004	Audience Award	Two Cars, One Night	Won	
National Geographic All Roads Film Festival	2004	Audience Award	Tama Tū	Nominated	
Neuchâtel International Fantastic Film Festival	2014	Best Feature Film	What We Do in the Shadows	Nominated	
Neuchâtel International Fantastic Film Festival	2014	Audience Award	What We Do in the Shadows	Won	
Nevada Film Critics Society	2019	Best Adapted Screenplay	Jojo Rabbit	Won	
Newport Beach Film Festival	2007	Outstanding Achievement in Filmmaking — Comedy	Eagle vs Shark	Won	
Newport International Film Festival	2004	Jury Prize	Two Cars, One Night	Won	
Newport International Film Festival	2007	Best Narrative Feature (Jury Award)	Eagle vs Shark	Won	
New York Festivals Advertising Awards	2014	Film (Politics & Government) — First Prize Award	"Blazed" (for NZ Transport Agency)	Won	
New York Festivals Advertising Awards	2014	Direction — First Prize Award	"Blazed" (for NZ Transport Agency)	Won	
New York Festivals Advertising Awards	2021	Direction — Silver	"The Letter" (for Coca-Cola)	Won	
New York Film Critics Online	2019	Top 10 Films	Jojo Rabbit	Won	
New Zealand Comedy Guild	2004	Best Comedy Writing For Film Or Television	Hunt for the Wilderpeople	Won	
New Zealand Comedy Guild	2017	Best Comedy Writing For Film Or Television	Taika Waititi	Won	
New Zealand Film and Television Awards	2000	Best Actor	Scarfies	Nominated	
New Zealand Film and Television Awards	2003	Best Short Film	Two Cars, One Night	Nominated	
New Zealand Film and Television Awards	2003	Best Short Film Screenplay	Two Cars, One Night	Won	
New Zealand Film and Television Awards	2008	Best Picture (Budget over $1 million)	Eagle vs Shark	Nominated	
New Zealand Film and Television Awards	2008	Achievement in Directing in Film (Budget under and over $1 million)	Eagle vs Shark	Won	
New Zealand Film and Television Awards	2008	Best Screenplay in Film	Eagle vs Shark	Nominated	
New Zealand Film and Television Awards	2010	Best Feature Film	Boy	Won	
New Zealand Film and Television Awards	2010	Best Screenplay for a Feature Film	Boy	Won	
New Zealand Film and Television Awards	2010	Best Director in a Film Feature	Boy	Won	
New Zealand Film and Television Awards	2010	Best Supporting Actor in a Feature Film	Boy	Won	
New Zealand Film and Television Awards	2014	Best Self Funded Film	What We Do in the Shadows	Won	
New Zealand Film and Television Awards	2017	Best Film	Hunt for the Wilderpeople	Won	
New Zealand Film and Television Awards	2017	Best Screenplay	Hunt for the Wilderpeople	Won	
New Zealand Film and Television Awards	2017	Best Director	Hunt for the Wilderpeople	Won	
New Zealand Film and Television Awards	2020	Best Comedy or Entertainment Programme	Wellington Paranormal	Won	
New Zealand Film and Television Awards	2021	Best Comedy or Entertainment Programme	Wellington Paranormal	Won	
New Zealand Film and Television Awards	2022	Best Comedy Series	Wellington Paranormal	Nominated	
Nickelodeon Australian Kids' Choice Awards	2018	Favorite Ultimate Icon	Taika Waititi	Nominated	
Night Visions Film Festival	2014	Audience Award	What We Do in the Shadows	Won	
North Carolina Film Critics Association	2016	Best Adapted Screenplay	Hunt for the Wilderpeople	Nominated	
North Carolina Film Critics Association	2019	Best Narrative Film	Jojo Rabbit	Nominated	
North Carolina Film Critics Association	2019	Best Adapted Screenplay	Jojo Rabbit	Nominated	
North Carolina Film Critics Association	2019	Best Director	Jojo Rabbit	Nominated	
North Texas Film Critics Association	2016	Best Foreign Language Film	Hunt for the Wilderpeople	Nominated	
North Texas Film Critics Association	2019	Best Picture	Jojo Rabbit	Nominated	
Oklahoma Film Critics Circle	2019	Best Film	Jojo Rabbit	Nominated	
Oklahoma Film Critics Circle	2019	Best Adapted Screenplay	Jojo Rabbit	Nominated	
Online Association of Female Film Critics	2019	Best Film	Jojo Rabbit	Nominated	
Online Association of Female Film Critics	2019	Best Adapted Screenplay	Jojo Rabbit	Won	
Online Film Critics Society	2014	Best Non-U.S. Release	What We Do in the Shadows	Won	
Online Film Critics Society	2019	Best Picture	Jojo Rabbit	Nominated	
Online Film Critics Society	2019	Best Adapted Screenplay	Jojo Rabbit	Nominated	
Online Film & Television Association	2020	Best Picture	Jojo Rabbit	Nominated	
Online Film & Television Association	2020	Best Writing, Screenplay Based on Material from Another Medium	Jojo Rabbit	Nominated	
Online Film & Television Association	2020	Best Voice-Over Performance in an Animated Program	The Mandalorian	Nominated	
Online Film & Television Association	2020	Best Comedy Series	What We Do in the Shadows	Nominated	
Online Film & Television Association	2022	Best Comedy Series	What We Do in the Shadows	Nominated	
Online Film & Television Association	2022	Best Comedy Series	Reservation Dogs	Nominated	
Online Film & Television Association	2022	Best Writing in a Comedy Series	Reservation Dogs	Nominated	
Online Film & Television Association	2023	Best Comedy Series	What We Do in the Shadows	Nominated	
Orlando Film Festival	2019	Best Feature Film	Jojo Rabbit	Nominated	
Pacific Meridian International Film Festival of Asia-Pacific	2007	Special Jury Award	Eagle vs Shark	Won	
Palm Springs International Festival of Short Films	2005	Best Live Action Over 15 Minutes	Tama Tū	Won	
Peabody Awards	2022	Entertainment	Reservation Dogs	Won	
Peabody Awards	2023	Entertainment	Reservation Dogs	Nominated	
Peabody Awards	2023	Entertainment	Our Flag Means Death	Nominated	
Peabody Awards	2024	Entertainment	Reservation Dogs	Won	
Phoenix Critics Circle	2016	Best Comedy Film	Hunt for the Wilderpeople	Won	
Phoenix Critics Circle	2019	Best Picture	Jojo Rabbit	Nominated	
Phoenix Critics Circle	2019	Best Comedy Film	Jojo Rabbit	Won	
Phoenix Critics Circle	2019	Best Screenplay	Jojo Rabbit	Nominated	
Phoenix Critics Circle	2019	Best Director	Jojo Rabbit	Nominated	
Phoenix Film Critics Society	2016	Overlooked Film of the Year	Hunt for the Wilderpeople	Nominated	
Phoenix Film Critics Society	2019	Top Ten Films	Jojo Rabbit	Won	
Phoenix Film Critics Society	2019	Best Screenplay Adapted from Other Material	Jojo Rabbit	Won	
Red Nation Film Festival	2022	Best Television Series	Reservation Dogs	Won	
Rockie Awards	2022	Scripted: Comedy Series - English Language	What We Do in the Shadows	Nominated	
Rondo Hatton Classic Horror Awards	2014	Best Independent Film	What We Do in the Shadows	Won	
Saint Tropez Film Festival	2005	Honourable Jury Mention	Tama Tū	Won	
San Diego Film Critics Society	2015	Best Original Screenplay	What We Do in the Shadows	Won	
San Diego Film Critics Society	2015	Best Ensemble	What We Do in the Shadows	Won	
San Diego Film Critics Society	2016	Best Adapted Screenplay	Hunt for the Wilderpeople	Nominated	
San Diego Film Critics Society	2019	Best Adapted Screenplay	Jojo Rabbit	Nominated	
San Diego Film Critics Society	2019	Best Comedic Performance	Jojo Rabbit	Nominated	
San Diego Film Critics Society	2019	Best Use of Music in a Film	Jojo Rabbit	Nominated	
San Francisco Film Critics Circle	2019	Best Adapted Screenplay	Jojo Rabbit	Won	
San Francisco International Film Festival	2016	Audience Award for Best Narrative Feature	Hunt for the Wilderpeople	Won	
San Sebastián Horror and Fantasy Film Festival	2014	Audience Award for Best Feature Film	What We Do in the Shadows	Won	
Satellite Awards	2020	Best Adapted Screenplay	Jojo Rabbit	Nominated	
Satellite Awards	2020	Best Actor – Motion Picture Musical or Comedy	Jojo Rabbit	Nominated	
Satellite Awards	2021	Best Television Series – Musical or Comedy	What We Do in the Shadows	Nominated	
Satellite Awards	2022	Best Television Series – Musical or Comedy	What We Do in the Shadows	Nominated	
Satellite Awards	2024	Best Television Series – Musical or Comedy	Reservation Dogs	Nominated	
Saturn Awards	2016	Best Horror Film	What We Do in the Shadows	Nominated	
Saturn Awards	2017	Best Independent Film	Hunt for the Wilderpeople	Nominated	
Saturn Awards	2018	Best Comic-to-Film Motion Picture	Thor: Ragnarok	Nominated	
Saturn Awards	2019	Best Horror Television Series	What We Do in the Shadows (TV series)	Nominated	
Saturn Awards	2021	Best International Film	Jojo Rabbit	Nominated	
Saturn Awards	2021	Best Horror Television Series	What We Do in the Shadows (TV series)	Nominated	
Saturn Awards	2022	Best Horror Television Series	What We Do in the Shadows (TV series)	Nominated	
Saturn Awards	2024	Best Horror Television Series	What We Do in the Shadows (TV series)	Nominated	
Screen Production and Development Association (NZ)	2014	Independent Producer of the Year	Taika Waititi	Won	
Seattle International Film Festival	2004	Best Short Film: Live Action	Two Cars, One Night	Won	
Seattle International Film Festival	2016	Best Film	Hunt for the Wilderpeople	Nominated	
Seattle International Film Festival	2016	Futurewave Youth Jury Award	Hunt for the Wilderpeople	Nominated	
Seriencamp	2021	Critics' Choice Award	Reservation Dogs	Won	
Sitges Film Festival	2014	Audience Award — Best Feature Film	What We Do in the Shadows	Won	
Sitges Film Festival	2014	Special Mention	What We Do in the Shadows	Won	
Southeastern Film Critics Association	2019	Best Picture	Jojo Rabbit	Nominated	
Spikes Asia	2014	Direction — Silver Spike	"Blazed" (for NZ Transport Agency)	Won	
Spikes Asia	2015	Branded Content & Entertainment Film — Silver Spike	"TinnyVision" (for NZ Transport Agency)	Won	
Stanley Film Festival	2014	Audience Award	What We Do in the Shadows	Won	
St. Louis Film Critics Association	2015	Best Comedy Film	What We Do in the Shadows	Nominated	
St. Louis Film Critics Association	2019	Best Film	Jojo Rabbit	Nominated	
St. Louis Film Critics Association	2019	Best Comedy Film	Jojo Rabbit	Nominated	
St. Louis Film Critics Association	2019	Best Adapted Screenplay	Jojo Rabbit	Nominated	
St. Louis Film Critics Association	2019	Best Director	Jojo Rabbit	Nominated	
Stockholm International Fantastic Film Festival — Monsters of Film	2014	Audience Award	What We Do in the Shadows	Won	
Stockholm International Film Festival	2005	Best Short Film	Tama Tū	Won	
Stockholm International Film Festival	2019	Audience Award	Jojo Rabbit	Won	
Sundance Film Festival	2005	Honorable Mention in Short Filmmaking	Tama Tū	Won	
Sundance Film Festival	2007	World Cinema — Dramatic	Eagle vs Shark	Nominated	
Sundance Film Festival	2010	World Cinema — Dramatic	Boy	Nominated	
Sydney Film Festival	2010	Audience Award for Best Feature Film	Boy	Won	
Taipei Film Festival	2007	Grand Prize (International New Talent Competition)	Eagle vs Shark	Nominated	
Taipei Film Festival	2010	Grand Prize (International New Talent Competition)	Boy	Nominated	
Taipei Film Festival	2010	Special Mention (International New Talent Competition)	Boy	Won	
Tallinn Black Nights Film Festival	2016	Audience Award	What We Do in the Shadows	Won	
Tallinn Black Nights Film Festival	2016	Best Youth Film	What We Do in the Shadows	Nominated	
TCA Awards	2019	Outstanding New Program	What We Do in the Shadows	Nominated	
TCA Awards	2020	Outstanding Achievement in Comedy	What We Do in the Shadows	Nominated	
TCA Awards	2022	Outstanding New Program	Reservation Dogs	Nominated	
TCA Awards	2022	Outstanding Achievement in Comedy	Reservation Dogs	Nominated	
TCA Awards	2023	Outstanding Achievement in Comedy	Reservation Dogs	Nominated	
TCA Awards	2023	Outstanding Achievement in Comedy	What We Do in the Shadows	Nominated	
Teen Choice Awards	2018	Choice Movie – Sci-Fi/Fantasy	Thor: Ragnarok	Nominated	
Teen Choice Awards	2018	Choice Movie Scene Stealer	Thor: Ragnarok	Nominated	
The International ANDY Awards	2014	Web Film — Gold	"Blazed" (for NZ Transport Agency)	Won	
The International ANDY Awards	2014	Direction — Gold	"Blazed" (for NZ Transport Agency)	Won	
Titanic International Film Festival	2015	Audience Award	What We Do in the Shadows	Won	
Torino Film Festival	2014	Best Feature Film	What We Do in the Shadows	Nominated	
Torino Film Festival	2014	Best Screenplay — Jury Prize	What We Do in the Shadows	Won	
Toronto International Film Festival	2014	People's Choice Award: Midnight Madness	What we Do in the Shadows	Won	
Toronto International Film Festival	2019	People's Choice Award	Jojo Rabbit	Won	
Toronto International Film Festival	2019	Ebert Director Award	Taika Waititi	Won	
Turkish Film Critics Association	2020	Best Foreign Film	Jojo Rabbit	Nominated	
UK Jewish Film Festival	2019	Best Film	Jojo Rabbit	Nominated	
US Comedy Arts Festival	2007	Best Screenplay	Eagle vs Shark	Won	
USC Scripter Awards	2020	Film	Jojo Rabbit	Nominated	
Utah Film Critics Association	2019	Best Adapted Screenplay	Jojo Rabbit	Nominated	
Wairoa Māori Film Festival	2005	Best Dramatic Short	Two Cars, One Night	Won	
Warsaw International Film Festival	2014	Audience Award: Feature Film	What We Do in the Shadows	Won	
Washington D.C. Area Film Critics Association	2017	Best Motion Capture Performance	Thor: Ragnarok	Nominated	
Washington D.C. Area Film Critics Association	2019	Best Adapted Screenplay	Jojo Rabbit	Nominated	
Wisconsin Film Festival	2016	Audience Award for Best Narrative Feature	Hunt for the Wilderpeople	Won	
Women's Image Network Awards	2020	Outstanding Feature Film	Jojo Rabbit	Nominated	

== Other accolades ==
- Arts Foundation of New Zealand — New Generation Award (2007)
- New Zealand Institute of Landscape Architects — Gold Award in Landscape Design Category: Visionary Landscapes (2010)
- Victoria University of Wellington — Distinguished Alumni Award (2011)
- Arts Foundation of New Zealand — Laureate Award (2016)
- New Zealander of the Year (2017)
- Officer of the New Zealand Order of Merit for services to film (2020)

== See also ==
- List of accolades received by Jojo Rabbit
