= RADz =

Series of short films by Barry Thomas

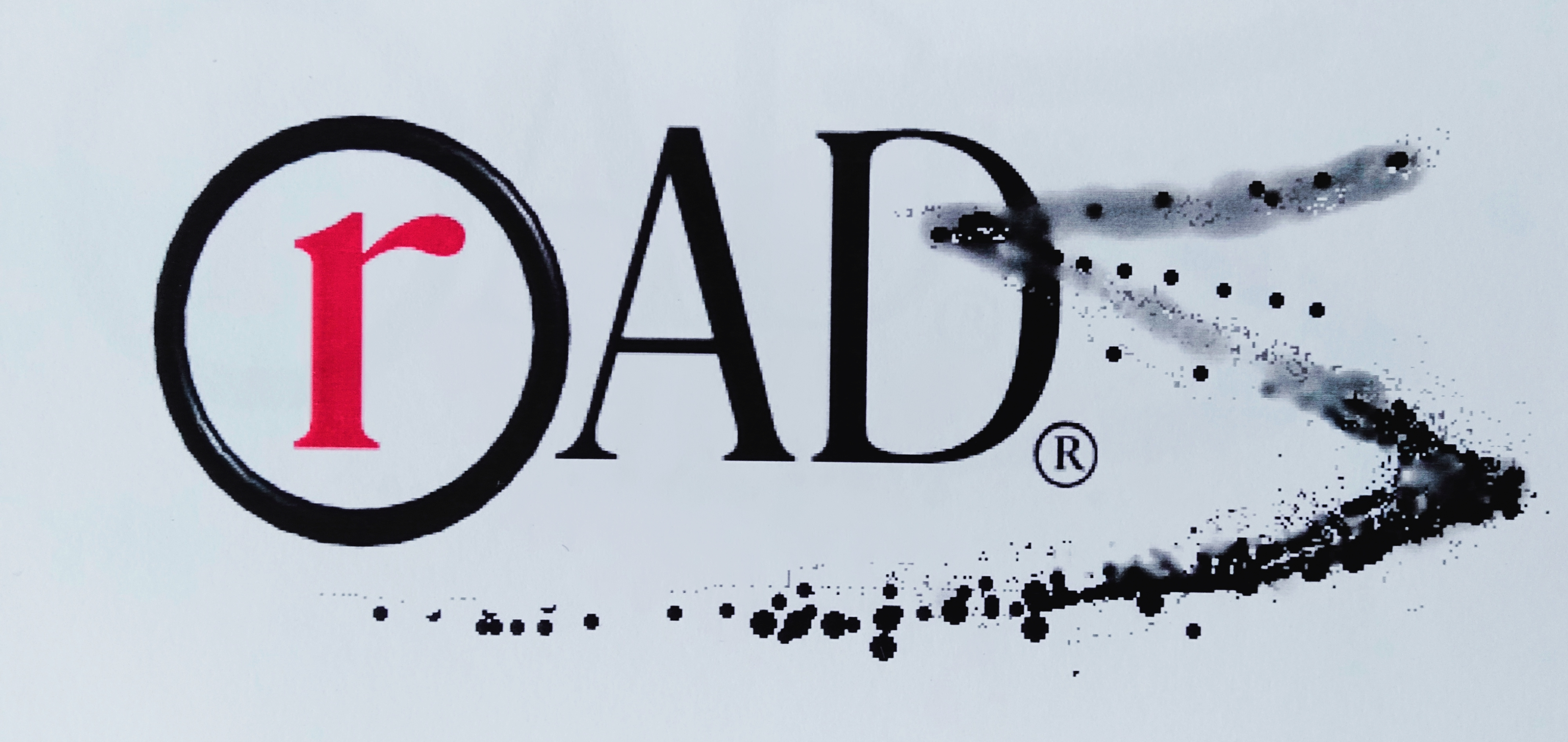
rADz logo (with red r) designed and made by Barry Thomas, owner of YETI Productions, who produced all NZ and UK rADz.

rADz are a series of short films shown during television ad breaks in the 1990s. They began in 1991 when New Zealand artist and film maker Barry Thomas made two rADz with avant garde theatre company Red Mole. A further four series (106 rADz) were made between 1997 and 2001 by New Zealand film makers. Around 60 further films were made in the UK and screened on late night BBC Two. rADz (short for Radical Art Advertisements) were initially modelled on television adverts in New Zealand; as such, they were exactly 15, 30, 45, 60 or 90 seconds long. With fewer constraints in the UK, rADz ranged up to 12 minutes in duration.

== Style ==
Conceptually, rADz are anti-ads which fit within the genre of intervention art - intervening into advertising breaks with fresh, stimulating, and challenging ideas and narratives. Genres are often humorous, sometimes political, alluring, or whimsical; many are also green. They tend to express youth culture, concerns, aspirations, vision, beliefs, and lifestyles. As such, rADz align with the notion of culture jamming, with artists expressing skepticism about monolithic markets and media, bureaucracy, and even democracy... advancing 'freedom of speech' where such freedoms have been curtailed or silenced.

"rADz interface poetry, art and film with no commercial imperative... using all the tricks and skills of advertising without having to hawk anything" - Barry Thomas.

Commentators have described them as: "standing the whole idea of advertising on its head"... "did I just see that?"( Chris Trotter) "Art dancing in the devil's playground." (Alan Brunton Barry Thomas) An early version of TikTok: "you could just have 30 seconds of someone jumping" (Dame Gaylene Preston), "You started TikTok" (Richard Moore)," Anti Ads", "Searing and brilliant - geniale", "A tiny slice of personal propaganda" (NZ Film Commission) "getting art in the middle of commercials?" (Barry Thomas), "... subversive" (Simon Vita), "If there's room for advertising to interrupt art then there's room for art to interrupt advertising" - Barry Thomas.

They arrived at the beginning of the internet and digital production era, when films had to be brief. The first digital morphing technology had just emerged; Yeti Productions developed its own morphing software, and the world's first fully capable capture board, powerful enough to import full video at 25 frames per second, had only recently been invented.

== Origins ==
Barry Thomas made environmental films, commercials and winning awards, so he offered New Zealand's national TV broadcaster, TVNZ, the idea of making short environmental clips to help New Zealanders improve their environmental footprints via mainstream television by utilizing what were then called "Community Service slots". All broadcasters were legally required to make these off-peak, charitable promotions available to community groups. Thomas had made many with the Hillary Commission – "Women in Sport", "Kiwisport", the Cancer Society's "Fit Food", the Salvation Army, and the Department of Conservation (DOC), including with Dame Whina Cooper and Jacques Cousteau.

Thomas hosted national meetings of all the country's environmental groups - Maruia Society, Doc, Ministry for the Environment, Forest and Bird, Greenpeace, ECO, and following investigation with Len Potts of Colenso Advertising agency, the group settled on TVNZ's Ad Agency - Saatchi and Saatchi to run what became "Earthcare". TVNZ and Saatchi formed the Earthcare Trust Inc., and trustees included Sir Edmund Hillary.

One minute of TVNZ airtime per day during the "Holmes show" was dedicated to Earthcare sponsors, and dozens of short clips were made advancing conservation and environmental issues. There was concern about the overall quality of production and accuracy of messaging. The brand also sold around $1 million in sponsorships to the NZ Lotteries Commission (Lotto), Fisher and Paykel, etc., at a reported $350,000 each. Sponsors received dedicated advertising spots in TVNZ's other off-peak environmental programmes. Revenue was earned from previously unsellable TV dead time by leveraging the good names of the country's green groups. Thomas made Kevin Smith (CEO of Forest and Bird) aware of these facts in 1992. All sponsors withdrew, and Earthcare was dead in two weeks.

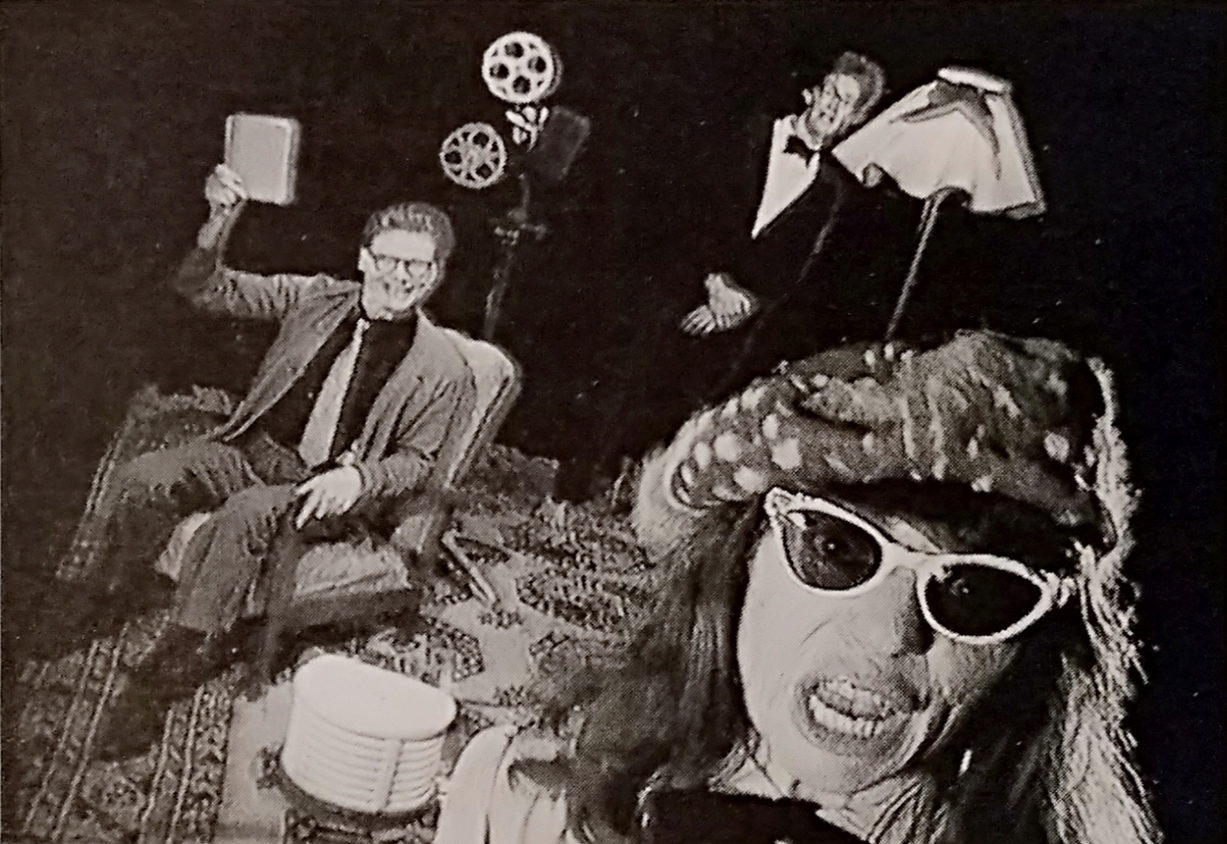
The first two "Book of Life" rADz were called "Cheap Spots", made by Yeti with Red Mole, which screened on TVNZ in November 1991. (From left) Alan Brunton, Carlos Wedde, and Sally Rodwell. Directed by Barry Thomas and Art Directed by Russell Collins. (Thomas Photo)

Undaunted, Thomas re-jigged his idea via his art roots and reached out to Red Mole Enterprises to make the first haiku art films (with no commercial imperative). The first two rADz were made under the name "Cheap Spots" in 1992 - a collaboration between Yeti Production Ltd. and Red Mole Enterprises.

The first two "Book of Life" Cheap Spots aired in November 1991, and even Jenny Holzer was quoted saying "I want the work to look like it belongs on TV, but not to look like a local car ad. The jolt comes from the context".

The name came from the notion that the Cheap spots aired during affordable off-peak TV airtime, which cost only $68 per screening.

The crew: Barry Thomas - Director/ camera/ edit, Russell Collins, Art Director, Alan Brunton, Sally Rodwell, scripts and acting, Carlos Wedde, acting.

=== Z Spots ===
Thomas re-named Cheap Spots as "Z Spots" - as all TVNZ advertising was rated A-Z depending on audience size, from expensive to cheap. He loaned his idea to three film makers including Jonathan Brough and Glenn Standring (Lenny Minute). This became a trademark dispute with the two sides agreeing to settle out of court.

=== rADz New Zealand 1997-2001 ===
Thomas then re-named them 'rADz', which he trademarked and sought to widen access by successfully applying to the NZ Film Commission and Creative New Zealand's Screen Innovation Fund for what became the first of four successive collections of about 30 rADz each. Each collection received c. $NZ30,000.

The first grant was in 1996, and the first collection of 31 rADz was made in 1997. Bettina Hollings (commissioning editor of TV3) bought the first collection (and subsequent following three) for the brand new youth-oriented TV4.

Thomas negotiated contracts between the filmmakers, YETI Productions, and TV3. He secured nominal payments of $500 per collection from the broadcaster to secure the history of having been paid to be in the middle of terrestrial TV ad breaks with art films, "selling nothing but Ideas, originality and art". Secondly Yeti Productions was paid to manage, run competitive tendering throughout the country for film makers and pay them 50% of any sales. rADz received 500 minutes of airtime per collection on TV4 - displayed throughout the schedule, including prime time. Each rAD lasted 15, 30, 45, 60, or 90 seconds, and each included proper film credits (unlike TV ads). Each filmmaker was given $500 to make their rADz.

He appointed two fellow adjudicators: film historian Lawrence McDonald and filmmaker Jane Perkins. Each collection had its own flyer, and a large screening was held to celebrate each collection at the Paramount Theatre in Wellington, NZ, on completion.

In total, around 100 film crews, comprising hundreds of artists, were selected from consistently well-attended calls for each collection. Some filmmakers were seasoned like Paul Maunder and Barry Thomas (who donated his own rAD "The End..." to the first collection), but the majority were up-and-coming directors, actors, etc.

In Collection # 2, Thomas announced, "I don't care if you shoot it on sellotape, come and make history, make rADz.

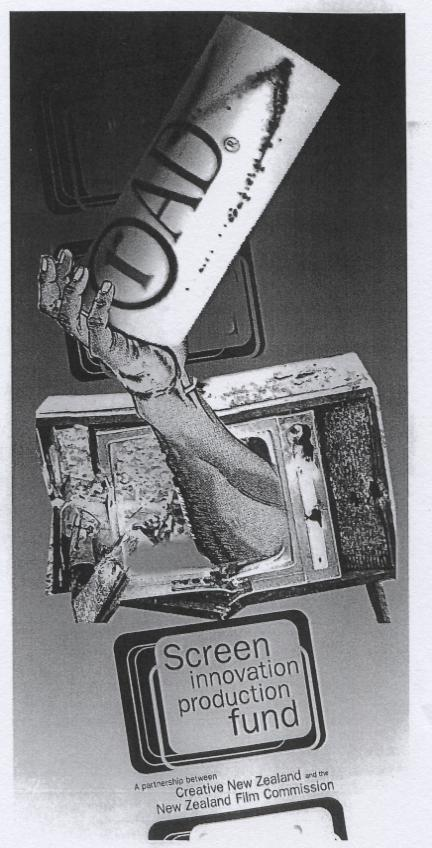
rADz collection # 1 flier

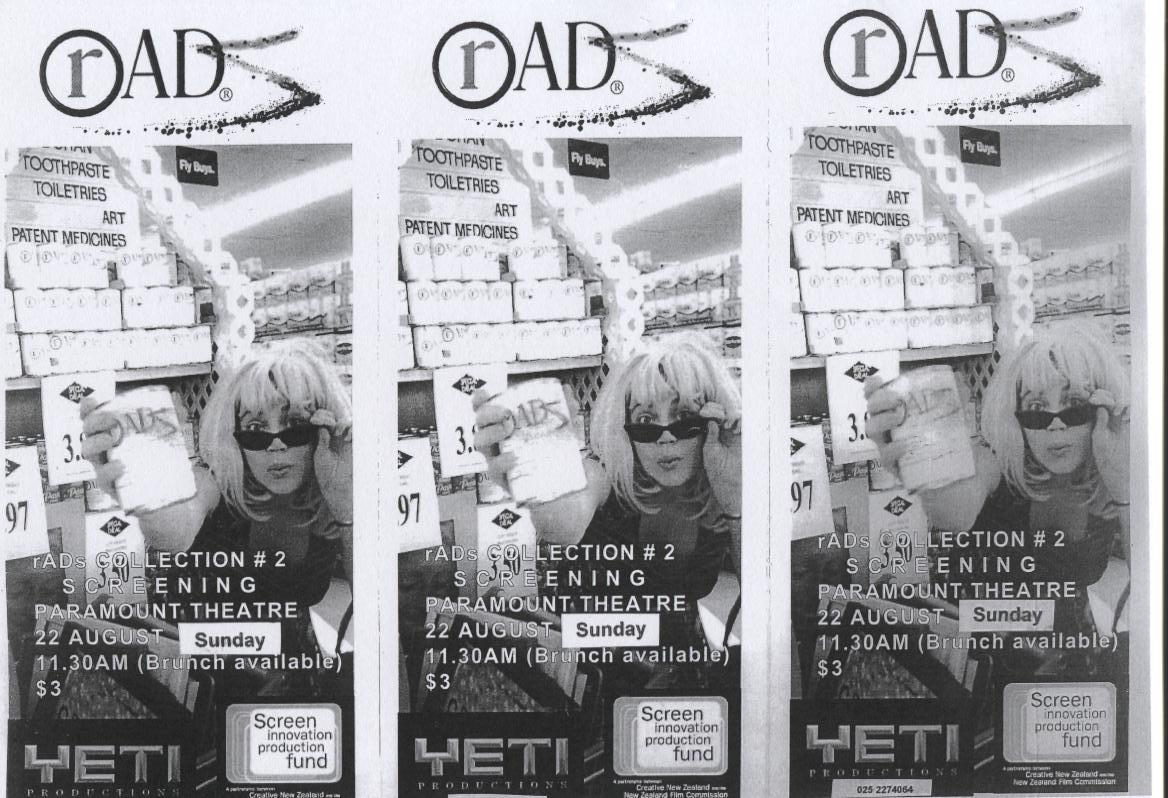
rADz collection # 2 flier for screening 1999. Art in the supermarket aisle, Consumers could buy tins of rADz and other "Leonardo and Duchamp specials only 2.97kg." Zoe Roland and Andy Galaxy.

== Significant contributors to NZ rADz ==
Lala Rolls, Greg Page, Nova Paul, Taika Waititi (Cohen), Jemaine Clement, Paul Maunder, Barry Thomas, Rhys Darby, Simon Raby, Peter Salmon, Struan Ashby, Phill Simmonds, Guy Capper, Mary Jane O'Reilly, Greg Page, Paul Swadel.

== Release ==
Collection #1 screened an 1,530 minutes in one year, equivalent to more than 15 feature films. Speaking of the difference between TV adverts and rADz Simon Vita reporting for City Voice Newspaper said that Johanna Sanders' rAD "Healthy Living" about the proposed destruction of inner city Wellington communities from the new urban motorway extension - "That makes worrying about whether your shampoo is going to do the biz kinda irrelevant".

=== Clermont Ferrand ===
Jan. 2001 and Jan 2002.

Following the screening of Collection #2 at the Paramount Theatre, the NZ Film Commission's Kathleen Drumm approached Thomas to represent rADz at the next Clermont-Ferrand International Short Film Festival in France in January 2000. After receiving no funding support and taking the advice from fellow filmmaker John Reid, "It might be time to sell the motorbike", Thomas joined the party and managed to sell rADz to In-Movies Ltd. in London and Sundance TV.

=== UK rADz ===
Thomas initially attempted, but failed, to attract televisual outcomes in the UK. All rADz made in the UK followed the same modus operandi. Yeti Productions worked with local groups and funders, and each film was workshopped within a short period, co-scripted, and crews were selected based on the will and passions of the mainly young participants, who acted as co-directors. Thomas tended to film most rADz on his Canon XL1 Mini DV camera (for efficiency) and edit them into a collection that was then screened back to the community at large gatherings. Participation certificates were awarded.

Thomas made 30 rADz in London with In-Movies Ltd. in 2000, co-producing with In-Movies Ltd. and the youthful Whatever Pictures (Bruce), including "Vrooom" Clare Palmer and "Big man the drink of heroes".

=== Manchester ===
John Wojowski of Manchester's Kino Film Festival engaged Thomas and Yeti Productions to produce seven collections, primarily featuring young people in poorer suburbs. The series was largely funded by the European (Community) Social Fund through the Manchester Youth College. And in a Kino Press release 16 April 2001 "rADz have been a hit all over Europe... and here in Manchester adapted to provide disenfranchised youth with vocational opportunities".

=== London ===
==== BBC ====
Thomas was the BBC's sole supplier for Blast TV's first youth TV screening on late-night BBC Two.

He donated 26 of the 'One Minute Wonder' - rADz in 2003 to Blast TV. The following year, Thomas became an advisor to Blast TV. BBC commissioned Thomas to make "Meadows Comin Thru' " which was transmitted on 18 October 2003. Each participant was awarded a Broadcast Certificate that testified that their film was included and broadcast, usually in the middle of the night. Exec Producer - Jane Quinn; Project Manager-Laia Gasch; Producer-Cathy Sheehan. (BBC CBBC Blast TV).

==== Pirate Castle ====
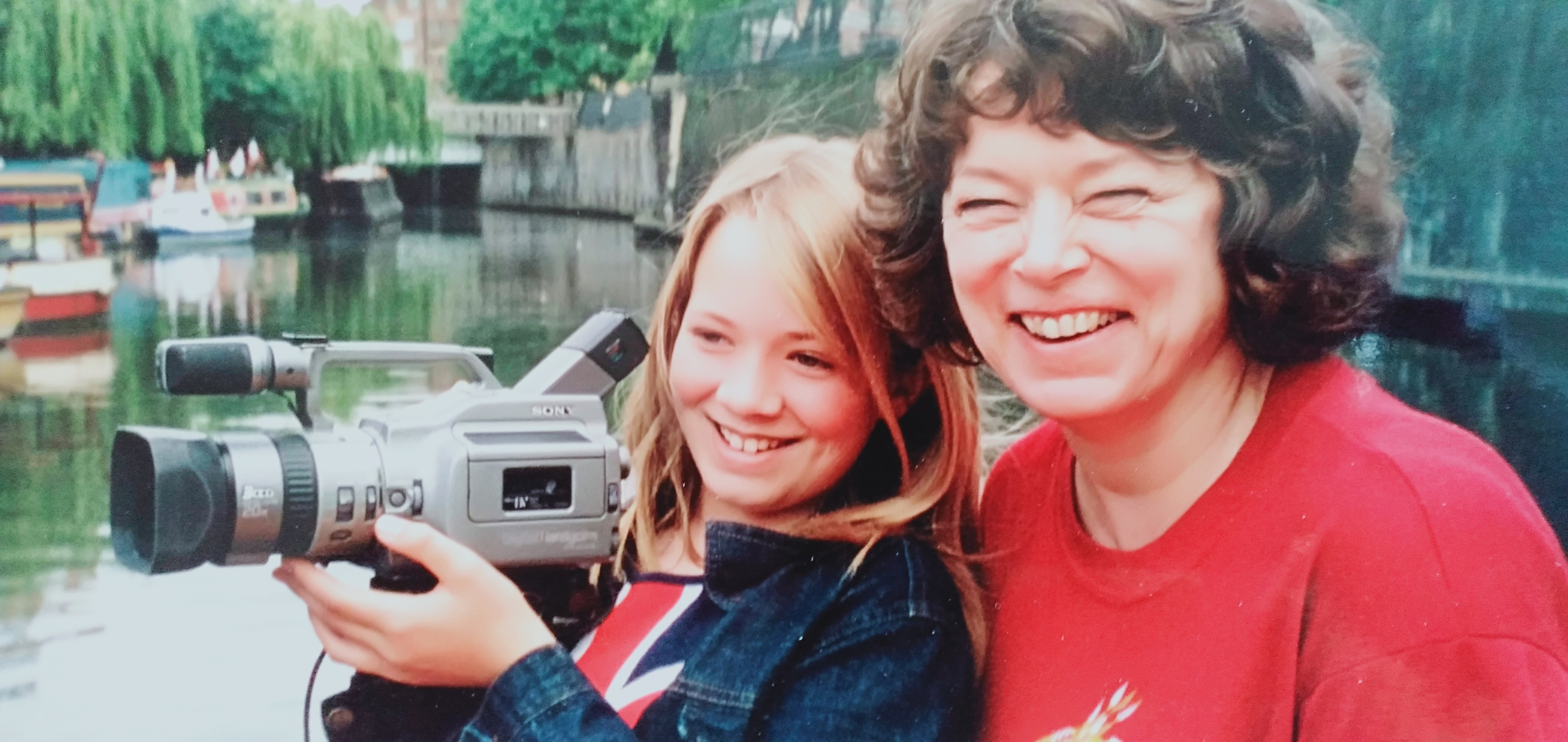
Sue Crockford with young Pirate filming "Masters of our canal" - with Barry Thomas. This rAD was commended with a "Communications Prize at the Tokyo Video Festival 2003.

Thomas was employed by Pirate Castle London (Inc.) part-time in 2002 and full-time in 2003 as resident film maker and activities co-ordinator. He lived on his own narrow boat 'Spirit' at the Pirate Castle and edited in its turret. He initiated several projects, including Junior Captains, filmmaking, and the purchase of a wide-beamed accessible community narrow boat.

==== Lisson Green ====
Collaboration between Thomas and Sue Crockford. June 2002, North London, with Groundwork London Waterways, The Pirate Castle, featuring the 2003 Tokyo Video Festival winner

He made several other series of rADz - some with Sue Crockford, Charlie Bleakley, and with local Club members and others.

==== Market Estate ====
Caroline Ryder described this 2002 project as depicting the real difficulties faced by youth growing up on estates. Funded by Youth Plus Neighbourhood Renewal Unit and co managed between Yeti Productions and Groundwork London. It was one of two London rADz projects that Adrian Cooper collaborated on.

==== Lancaster Youth Centre ====
Yeti with Barefoot films (Adrian Cooper). Thomas exec. produced, directed, filmed, and edited the youth dance troupe (20/20) rAD. Hayden Anayasi did graphics. In the first sequence, Thomas devised the idea that was later, in NYC, called a "Flash mob". A street beggar with a ghetto blaster, approached by dance troupe leader Monica, is offered a CD. Once the music starts, dancers appear out of nowhere in front of Ladbroke Grove train station. A real audience magically appears and watches the dancing and the filming. Samir Mamod was the 2nd unit camera. Flash mobs are another form of culture jamming.

==== Porirua ====
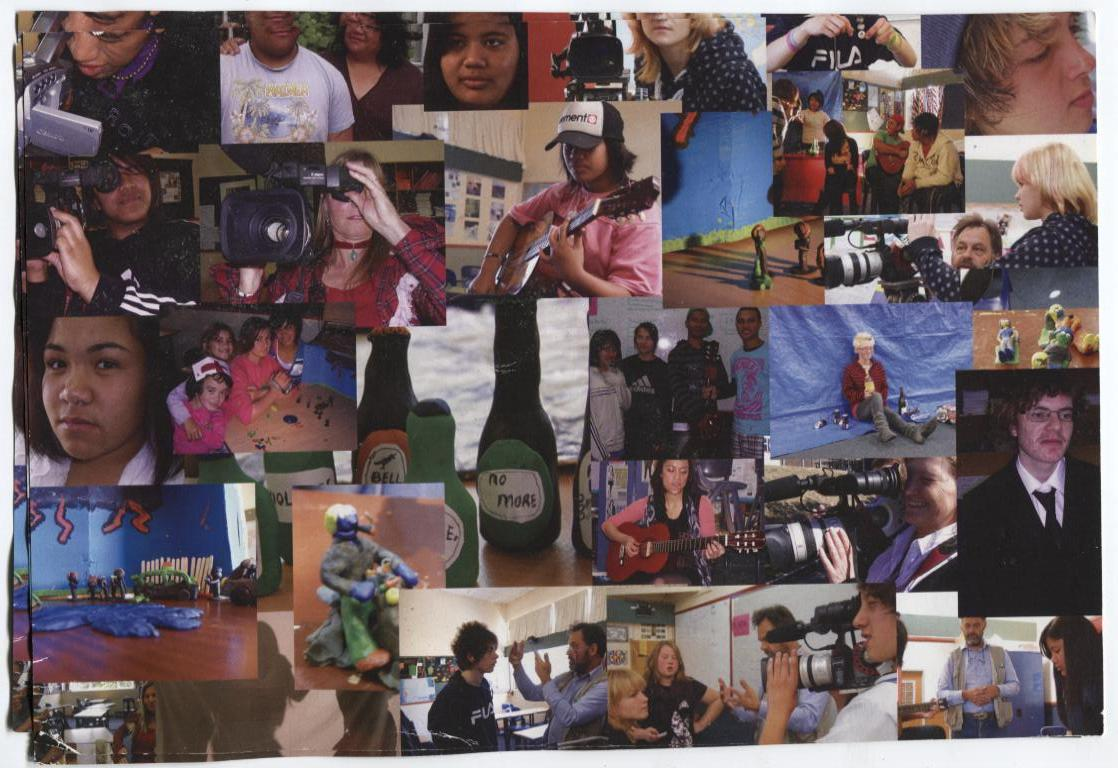
"Oi what about us" a series of rADz made at Aotea College, Porirua about the effects of alcohol on young people's lives 2008.

Thomas made a series of rADz "Oi what about us" at Aotea College to highlight the role of alcohol in their lives.

==== Aro Valley ====
In 2007, Thomas came to live in Wellington (where he still resides); he ran a short filmmaking course at the Aro Valley Community Centre, where he also made rADz with local youth.

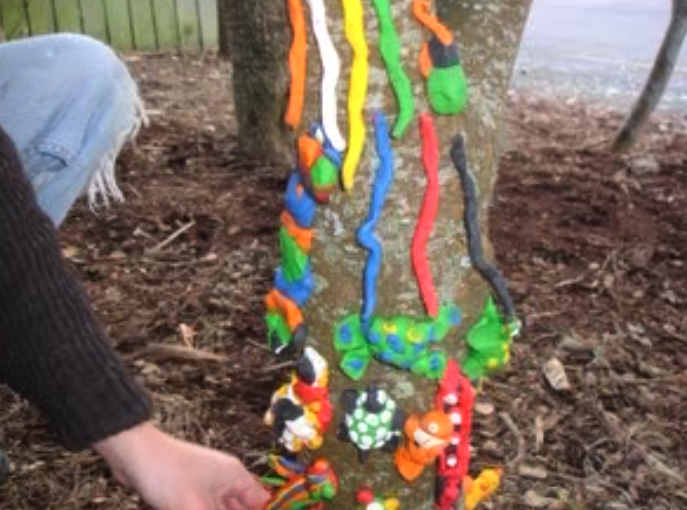
"Happy Too" - Claymation made in the Aro Valley depicting children's aspirations for the upgrading of their valley and community centre. The Aro Valley Park is the most popular in Wellington.

==== Te Arohou Apartments ====
In 2010, Thomas, with Catherine Allison, was engaged by the Wellington City Council's Social Housing upgrades team to use rADz to involve young people in the estate in planning and designing their own playground at the Te Arahou apartments in Newtown. They made a claymation rAD about the "animal-themed" playground and a documentary about the process. The design won an Australian Design and Planning award, and community artist Debra Bustin was then engaged to make the playground with the same youth. The Claymation involved the local legend of two taniwha Whataitai and Ngake, who created Whanganui a Tara - Wellington Harbour. Ngake can be viewed in the playground. Children came up with the basketball ring to be held by a giraffe reflecting the nearby Wellington Zoo.

== Festivals ==
Clermont-Ferrand International Short Film Festival 2000 and 2001. At the 2000 Festival, Thomas met John Wojowski and Lawrence Penn from the UK, who then employed him for the four years he lived there. In 2001, at Clermont-Ferrand, Thomas also met Sita Banerjee of the Capalbio International Film Festival.

Sita Banerjee was employed to run Rome's Festival of Brevity for Italy's Ministry of Culture. She selected and arranged the film components for the Festival and invited Thomas to show and discuss rADz. This was covered in the Il Messaggero newspaper by the Venice Film Festival's critics' week judge, Fabio Ferzetti (See further reading).

BTV (Bastard TV) Sheffield - National Centre for Popular Music 30 November - 1 December 2001.

"Poetry to go" Nga Taonga collection screenings 2004 and 2005, including Len Lye and rADz.

Aro Valley film festival part of NZFA TRAVELLING FILM SHOW SCREENING, ARO VALLEY COMMUNITY SCREENING 2012

including Media TV clip 22 May 1999

== Exhibitions ==
"Old and new" Hauraki House 2006 Coromandel

"Divested Interest" 2007 - Hauraki House and The Depot, Devonport.

"Old New borrow Blues" 2009 - Thistle Hall Wellington

== See also ==
Adbusters

Culture Jamming

Intervention art

https://www.youtube.com/watch?v=OCYNK6WVcbY

https://www.youtube.com/watch?v=dbhlrnj5sTw&t=12s

https://www.youtube.com/watch?v=3K8atawI2zU&t=2639s

https://www.youtube.com/watch?v=w8Jr4aw4UOU

https://www.youtube.com/watch?v=gRN6tTbsLqo

https://www.youtube.com/watch?v=gRi2f37LZew&t=21s

https://www.youtube.com/watch?v=ZVqLlKPMW9k

https://www.youtube.com/watch?v=SuOLq8vfQ8o&t=947s

https://www.youtube.com/watch?v=WH7vR03o5ZE
