= Taika Waititi =

New Zealand filmmaker and actor (born 1975)

Taika Waititi ONZM
- Waititi in 2026
- Born: Taika David Cohen; 16 August 1975 (age 51); Wellington, New Zealand
- Education: Victoria University of Wellington (BA)
- Occupations: Director; producer; screenwriter; writer; actor; comedian
- Years active: 1999–present
- Works: Full list
- Spouses: Chelsea Winstanley (m. 2011; div. 2018); Rita Ora (m. 2022)
- Children: 2
- Awards: Full list

Taika David Cohen (born 16 August 1975), known professionally as Taika Waititi (/ˈtaɪkə ˈwaɪtiti/ TY-kə WY-tee-tee), is a New Zealand filmmaker, writer, actor, and comedian. He has received numerous accolades including an Academy Award, a BAFTA Award and a Grammy Award, as well as nominations for two Golden Globe Awards and six Emmy Awards. Time magazine named him one of the 100 most influential people in the world in 2022.

His feature films Boy (2010) and Hunt for the Wilderpeople (2016) have each been the top-grossing film entirely funded and produced within New Zealand. (Note: For instance excluding The Lord of the Rings and Avatar film series, which were international co-productions.) Waititi's 2003 short film Two Cars, One Night earned him an Academy Award nomination for Best Live Action Short Film. He co-wrote, co-directed and starred in the horror comedy film What We Do in the Shadows (2014) with Jemaine Clement, which was adapted into a television series of the same name in 2019. The series has been nominated for the Primetime Emmy Award for Outstanding Comedy Series.

His directing credits include the superhero films Thor: Ragnarok (2017) and Thor: Love and Thunder (2022), as well as the black comedy film Jojo Rabbit (2019), the last of which he also wrote and starred in as an imaginary version of Adolf Hitler. Jojo Rabbit received six Academy Award nominations and won Best Adapted Screenplay. Waititi also earned the Grammy Award for Best Compilation Soundtrack for Visual Media.

In television, Waititi co-created and produced the comedy drama series Reservation Dogs, and directed, produced, and starred in the comedy Our Flag Means Death. In addition to directing an episode of the series The Mandalorian, he voiced the character IG-11, for which he was nominated for the Primetime Emmy Award for Outstanding Character Voice-Over Performance.

== Early life, family and education ==
Taika David Cohen was born on 16 August 1975 in Wellington. His Māori father was an artist of French Canadian and Te Whānau-ā-Apanui descent, while his mother, Robin Cohen, was a schoolteacher of European descent. His mother's paternal grandfather was a Russian Jew whose family came from Novozybkov. Waititi stated that his mother's family were Russian Jewish, Irish, and other European ethnicities. His paternal grandfather, also named Taika, served as a Māori Battalion soldier during World War II.

Waititi was raised in both Wellington's Aro Valley suburb and Raukokore, a small town in the Bay of Plenty. Identifying as both Māori and Jewish, Waititi describes himself as a "Polynesian Jew". He was raised more connected to his Māori roots, in a household where Judaism was not practised and identifies as an atheist who "puts more stock in indigenous beliefs." Although his surname is legally Cohen, Waititi has been known primarily by his father's surname for most of his life. He originally used his mother's surname, Cohen, for his work in film and writing, and his father's, Waititi, for visual arts endeavours. Following the success of his first short film, he continued to use Waititi professionally.

Waititi's parents divorced when he was around five, and he was raised primarily by his mother. His father was in and out of prison, and was the founding member of the Satans Slaves Motorcycle Club New Zealand chapter. Taika Waititi attended Onslow College, then studied theatre at Victoria University of Wellington where he graduated with a Bachelor of Arts in 1997.

== Career ==
=== 1999–2012: Early career and early films ===
While a student at Victoria University of Wellington, Waititi was part of the five-member comedy ensemble So You're a Man, which toured New Zealand and Australia with some success. He and Jemaine Clement, as the comedy duo The Humourbeasts, received New Zealand's highest comedy accolade, the Billy T Award, in 1999. Also in 1999, under the surname Cohen, he appeared in the black comedy film Scarfies. In 2000 he starred in the Haiku film "Titan - extra strength condoms" in the 3rd collection of rADz (radical art TV advertisements) which played on national television during ad breaks. Among a variety of artistic interests, Waititi began making comical short films for New Zealand's annual 48Hours film contest. He directed the short film Two Cars, One Night (2003) which involves two young boys and a girl meeting in the carpark of a rural pub in Te Kaha, New Zealand. The short earned acclaim and was nominated for the Academy Award for Best Live Action Short in 2005.

His first feature film was a romantic comedy, Eagle vs Shark. It was released in American theatres for limited distribution in 2007. Waititi co-wrote the film with Loren Horsley. That year, Waititi wrote and directed one episode of the TV show Flight of the Conchords and directed another. In 2010, he acted in the New Zealand TV3 improv sketch comedy show Radiradirah, together with frequent collaborators Rhys Darby and Jemaine Clement. His second feature, Boy, premiered at the Sundance Film Festival in January 2010, and was nominated for the Grand Jury Prize. Waititi also took one of the main roles, as the ex-con father who returns to his family. On its release in New Zealand, Boy received enthusiastic reviews and was successful at the local box office, eclipsing several records. In 2011, Waititi directed New Zealand TV series Super City starring Madeleine Sami, who plays five characters living in one city. That year, Waititi portrayed Thomas Kalmaku in the superhero feature film Green Lantern.

=== 2013–2020: Breakthrough and career expansion ===
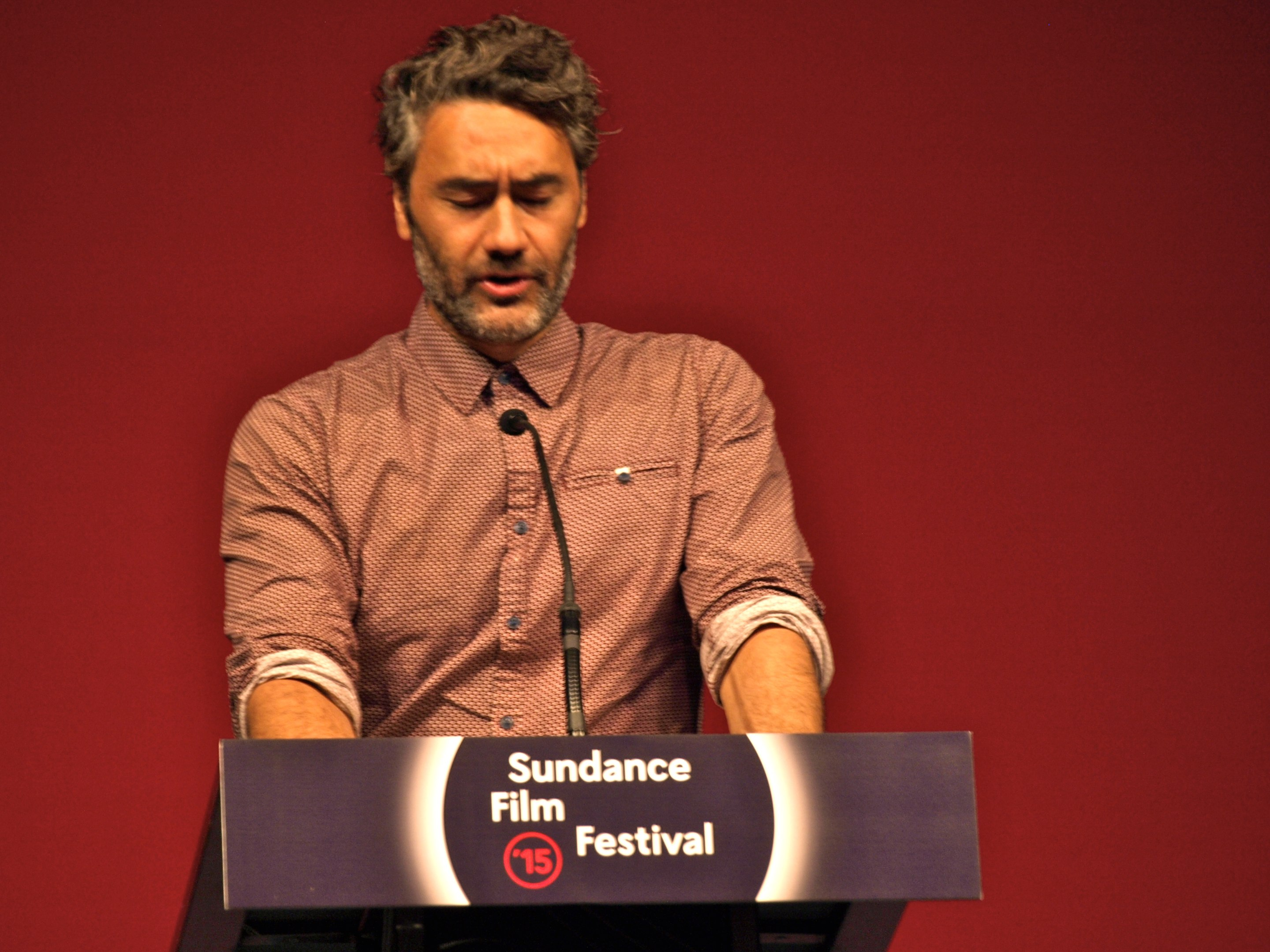
Waititi speaking at the 2015 Sundance Film Festival

In 2013, Waititi co-wrote, co-directed and acted in the vampire comedy mockumentary What We Do in the Shadows with Clement. It premiered at the Sundance Film Festival in January 2014. Waititi and Clement played members of a group of vampires who live in an appropriately gothic house in modern-day Wellington. A television adaptation of the film was commissioned in May 2018, with Waititi as an executive producer and director. The series of the same name premiered on FX in March 2019; its second season received a Primetime Emmy Award nomination for Outstanding Comedy Series.

Waititi's fourth feature, Hunt for the Wilderpeople, premiered at the 2016 Sundance Film Festival. When it was released in New Zealand, the comedy adventure broke Waititi's record for a New Zealand film in its opening weekend. Based on a book by Barry Crump, it centres on a young boy (played by Julian Dennison) and a grumpy man (played by Sam Neill) on the run in the wilderness. Waititi wrote the initial screenplay for the 2016 Disney film Moana, which focused on gender and family. Those elements were passed over in favour of what became the final story.

In 2017, Waititi won the award for New Zealander of the Year, but was unable to receive it in person due to work commitments. That year, he directed his first major studio film, Marvel Studios's Thor: Ragnarok, which was released in October. He also portrayed the alien Korg via motion capture in the film. He had previously directed a short film series for Marvel called Team Thor, chronicling the lives of Thor and his roommate, Darryl Jacobson. Thor: Ragnarok earned critical praise and was successful at the box office. Waititi was later consulted by Christopher Markus and Stephen McFeely on Thor's storylines for Avengers: Infinity War, to maintain the character's consistency in the Marvel Cinematic Universe.

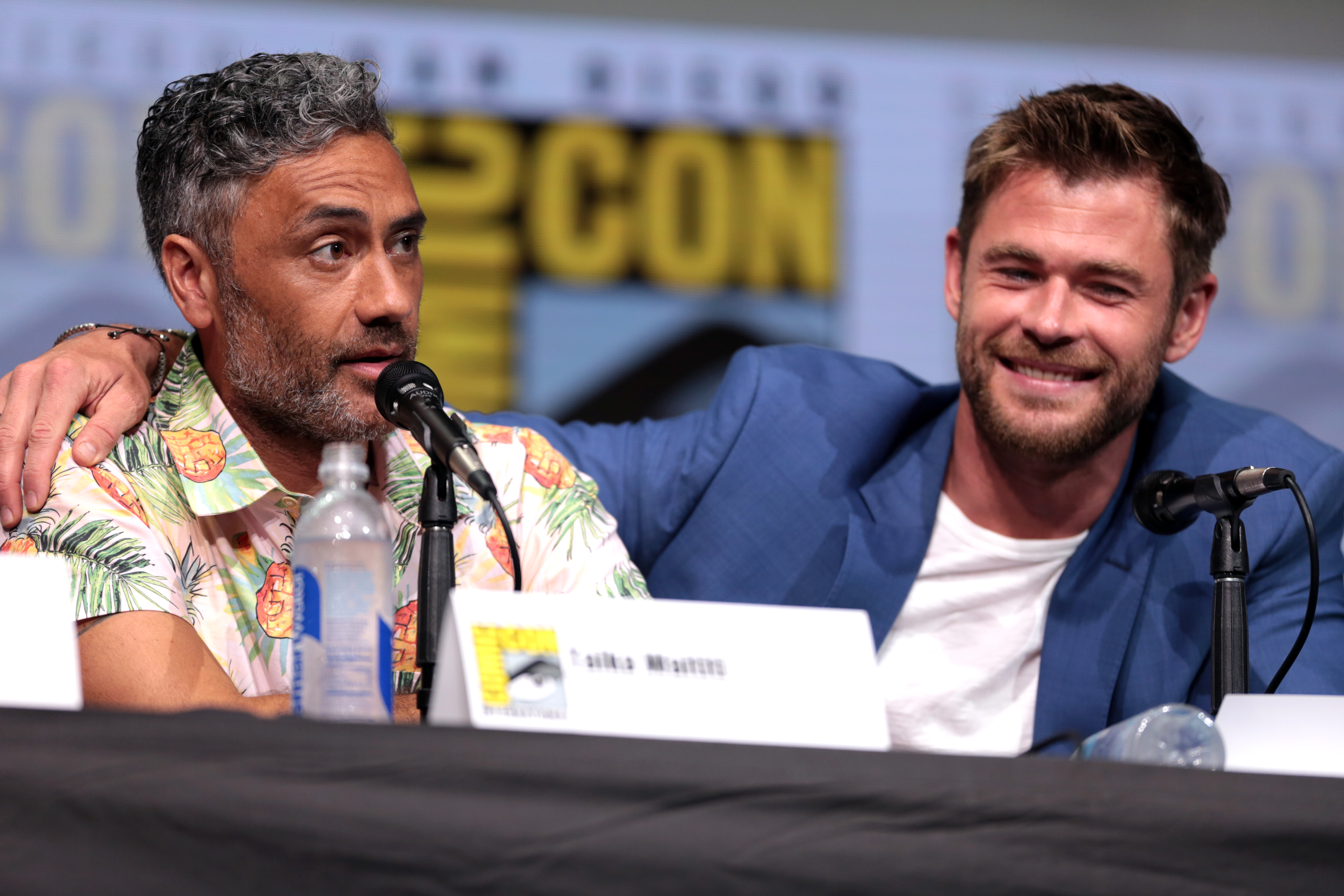
Waititi with Chris Hemsworth speaking at the 2017 San Diego Comic-Con

In 2019, Waititi wrote and directed Jojo Rabbit, based on the book Caging Skies by Christine Leunens, the 1940s-set story of a child in the Hitler Youth whose mother is secretly hiding a Jewish girl in their home. Waititi plays a buffoonish version of Adolf Hitler as the boy's imaginary friend. Waititi received Academy Award nominations for Best Picture and Best Adapted Screenplay. He won the latter, making him the first person of Māori descent to win an Academy Award in a screenplay category, and the first indigenous person to be nominated for and win Best Adapted Screenplay. In 2021 he won the Grammy Award for Best Compilation Soundtrack for Visual Media as a producer of the Jojo Rabbit soundtrack.

In October 2018, Lucasfilm announced that Waititi would be one of the directors of the Star Wars live-action streaming series The Mandalorian, which tells the story of a lone Mandalorian gunfighter in the period between the events of Return of the Jedi and The Force Awakens. The series premiered on 12 November 2019; Waititi also voices a droid bounty hunter named IG-11 in the series. He directed the series' first-season finale, "Chapter 8: Redemption". His voiceover work earned him a Primetime Emmy Award nomination for Outstanding Character Voice-Over Performance in 2020.

=== 2020–present: Established career ===
In 2020, Waititi narrated a charity reading of James and the Giant Peach by Roald Dahl. He cameoed as the original Ratcatcher in the DC superhero film The Suicide Squad, released in August 2021 to positive reviews. Also in August, Waititi portrayed Antwan Hovachelik, the antagonist of the action comedy film Free Guy. With Sterlin Harjo, Waititi co-created the comedy series Reservation Dogs, which chronicles the lives of a group of indigenous Oklahoma teens. Its main cast, directors, producers, and writers are indigenous peoples. It premiered on FX and received positive reviews. Waititi executive produced, directed and starred as Blackbeard in the HBO Max comedy series Our Flag Means Death. The first season was released in March 2022. That same year, Time magazine placed him on its annual list of the 100 most influential people in the world. Waititi voiced Mo Morrison in the Pixar film Lightyear (2022).

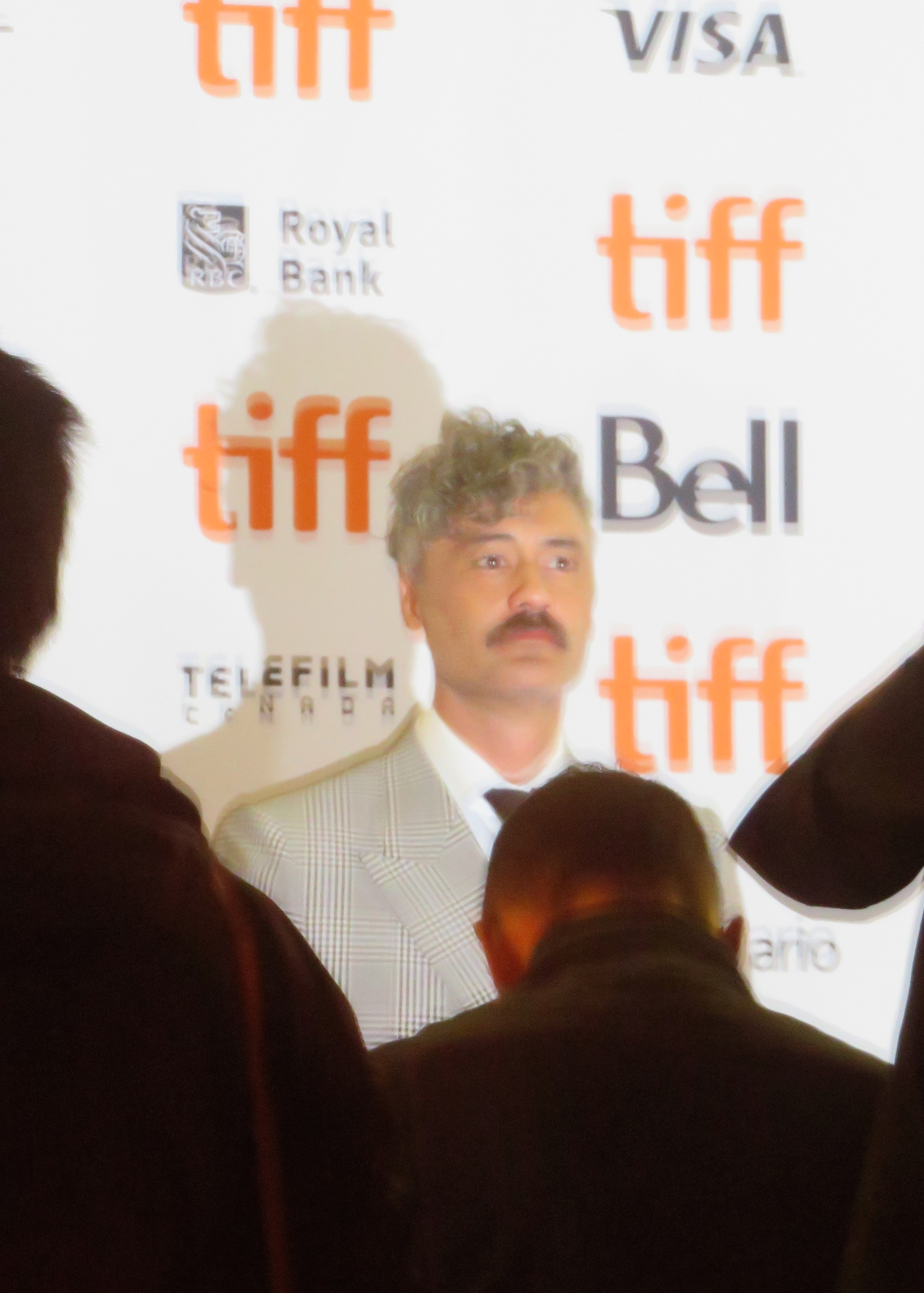
Waititi at the premiere of Jojo Rabbit (2019) at the 2019 Toronto International Film Festival

He wrote and directed the superhero film Thor: Love and Thunder, a sequel to Thor: Ragnarok. It released in July 2022. The film received mixed reviews with critic Mark Kermode complained that "the jokes, the catch-phrases [are] just incredibly tired". Richard Brody of The New Yorker described the film writing "The film passes through the nervous system without delivering any sustenance or even leaving a residue." In her mixed review from NPR, Amy Nicholson added "I was really compelled by the ideas Taika Waititi was teasing in this film, but the actual style of it – the eagerness to please – made me take a step back from everything. [But] what he's discussing is really smart."

Waititi also directed a feature film adaptation of the documentary Next Goal Wins prior to directing Thor: Love and Thunder. The film, which had been delayed, was released on 17 November 2023, after Armie Hammer's scenes were re-shot with Will Arnett taking over the role. The film premiered at the 2023 Toronto International Film Festival to negative reviews. Esther Zuckerman of IndieWire praised some of the performances but labeled it as "largely a misfire". Peter Bradshaw of The Guardian described it as "a shoddily made and strikingly unfunny attempt to tell an interesting story in an uninteresting way".

In 2024, Waititi directed and co-wrote the pilot episode of a television adaptation of the Terry Gilliam film, Time Bandits, alongside frequent collaborators Jemaine Clement and Iain Morris. In 2024, Waititi directed the pilot and executive produced a television adaptation of the Charles Yu novel, Interior Chinatown, starring Jimmy O. Yang.

In 2025, Waititi appeared in season thirteen of The Masked Singer as "Detective Lucky Duck". Like Donnie Wahlberg as "Cluedle-Doo", Detective Lucky Duck gave clues involving each of the contestants. Waititi was revealed to be Lucky Duck in the semi-finals; this surprised his wife Rita Ora, who was one of the panelists.

In February 2026, a Pepsi commercial directed by Waititi aired during Super Bowl LX. The commercial depicted a Coca-Cola polar bear taking on the Pepsi Challenge, only to find out that it prefers the Pepsi drink. The commercial featured an appearance of Waititi as the bear's therapist. In April 2026, Netflix announced that Waititi will voice Willy Wonka in Charlie vs. The Chocolate Factory, an animated film follow-up to Charlie and the Chocolate Factory. He is also an executive producer for it.

Waititi's next film was Klara and the Sun, an adaptation of Kazuo Ishiguro's novel of the same name. Waititi co-wrote the film with Dahvi Waller. It was released in October 2026 and stars Jenna Ortega, Amy Adams, Mia Tharia, Aran Murphy, Steve Buscemi and Natasha Lyonne. It received poor reviews, with a Rotten Tomatoes Critic's Score of 24%, and was a box-office bomb. Waititi dismissed critics of the film as "sad lost souls who couldn’t achieve their dreams of becoming artists, and thus became critics...Irrelevant. Out of touch. Obsolete. In the bin.”

== Personal life ==
Waititi was in a relationship with New Zealand actress and writer Loren Horsley for ten years. She co-wrote and acted in his directorial debut, Eagle vs Shark (2007).

Waititi met New Zealand film producer Chelsea Winstanley in 2010. They married in 2011; together, they have two daughters. Waititi and Winstanley separated in 2018.

Waititi has been in a relationship with British singer Rita Ora since 2021. They married in August 2022.

=== Support for indigenous artists ===
Waititi incorporates his Māori and indigenous heritage into his projects, such as by including indigenous interns and having traditional owners conduct a Welcome to Country ceremony during the start of filming on set in Australia. He is an executive producer of the New Zealand films The Breaker Upperers (2018), Baby Done (2020), and Night Raiders (2021), all directed by Māori or indigenous filmmakers. In 2021, Waititi's cousin Tweedie Waititi, whom he considers a sibling, began producing and directing Māori language versions of Disney animated films due to Waititi, which she does alongside his former partner Winstanley. In 2023, Waititi was the executive producer on Frybread Face and Me, a film directed by Billy Luther. In 2024, Waititi was executive producer on We Were Dangerous directed by Josephine Stewart-Te Whiu.

== Filmography ==
Directed features
Year	Title	Distribution
2007	Eagle vs Shark	Hoyts Distribution
2010	Boy	Transmission Films; Madman Entertainment; Kino Lorber
2014	What We Do in the Shadows	Madman Entertainment
2016	Hunt for the Wilderpeople	Madman Entertainment; Piki Films
2017	Thor: Ragnarok	Walt Disney Studios Motion Pictures
2019	Jojo Rabbit	Fox Searchlight Pictures
2022	Thor: Love and Thunder	Walt Disney Studios Motion Pictures
2023	Next Goal Wins	Searchlight Pictures
2026	Klara and the Sun	Sony Pictures Releasing

== Accolades and honours ==
Waititi has received various awards and nominations, including an Academy Award, a British Academy Film Award, a Grammy Award, a Writers Guild of America Award, and nominations for the Golden Globe Awards and Primetime Emmy Awards, among others.

Together with Jemaine Clement, Waititi won the Billy T Award in 1999. In 2005, Waititi received a nomination for the Academy Award for Best Live Action Short Film for the short film Two Cars, One Night (2004). In 2019, he wrote and directed the comedy-drama film Jojo Rabbit, which was met with critical acclaim and earned him the Academy Award for Best Adapted Screenplay, the BAFTA Award for Best Adapted Screenplay, and nominations for the Academy Award for Best Picture, the Golden Globe Award for Best Musical or Comedy Film and the Directors Guild of America Award for Outstanding Directing in a Feature Film. For the soundtrack of the film, he won the Grammy Award for Best Compilation Soundtrack for Visual Media.

Since 2019, he has written and produced the television series, What We Do in the Shadows, based on the 2014 film of the same name, for which he was nominated for the Primetime Emmy Award for Outstanding Comedy Series and the Writers Guild of America Award for Best New Series.

In the 2020 Queen's Birthday Honours, Waititi was appointed an Officer of the New Zealand Order of Merit, for services to film.

== See also ==
- List of New Zealand Academy Award winners and nominees
