= Directory of Social Change =

The Directory of Social Change (DSC) exists to support charities in the work they do. A charity itself it provides training, books, funding sources, online resources, bespoke research, and it campaigns to make the UK a better environment for charities to thrive in. Led by chief executive Debra Allcock Tyler, DSC’s activities bring it into contact with around 20,000 voluntary sector organizations each year. DSC is largely self-sustaining and earns around 95% of its income through the sale of publications and training. DSC is a registered charity, limited by guarantee. The trustees of the charity are also members and directors of the company.

On 14 October 2026, DSC announced it had appointed an insolvency practitioner to manage its closure.

== Activity ==
DSC’s main activities include:

- Training in the areas of fundraising, management and leadership, personal development, finance, law, governance, marketing and communications, policy, campaigns and research
- Researching and publishing reference guides and handbooks
- Providing subscription funding websites detailing sources of funding for the voluntary sector from trusts and foundations, the government and companies
- Running conferences, seminars, briefings and fairs including Charityfair
- Campaigning and policy work, focusing on championing the needs of small and medium voluntary sector organizations
- Undertaking bespoke research projects to inform charities
- Providing free resources, top tips and best practice articles on its website

== History ==
In 1975 Michael Norton published a book entitled 'The Directory of Social Change' and the organization was formed. The book, was a directory, the first of its kind, full of ideas, information and contacts for those wanting to explore alternatives for creating better communities and a better society. The film maker Sue Crockford was a founding trustee and member for 35 years.

Four directories were published on community, education, housing and women. In 1977, Michael organized his first fundraising training and started publishing practical information on fundraising, marketing, management and legal issues for charities. In 1984, looking for a more sustainable source of income, Michael created the first “Guide to Company Giving” and then asked Luke FitzHerbert to create a “Guide to the Major Trusts”.

This was how the Directory of Social Change started, adopting the principles of social enterprise in structuring how it operated and was funded.

In 1988, Luke FitzHerbert became co-director with Michael Norton and together they established DSC’s Liverpool office. In 1992, DSC organized the first Charityfair. In 1995, Norton and FitzHerbert stepped down as co-directors and Mike Eastwood was appointed as their successor. In 2001, Eastwood stepped down and Debra Allcock Tyler was appointed.

Since 1975 DSC has helped make tens of thousands of charities stronger. In 2016, around 35 staff worked in their London and Liverpool offices.
