= Two Cars, One Night =

2004 short film by Taika Waititi

- Poster
- Directed by: Taika Waititi
- Written by: Taika Waititi
- Produced by: Vanessa Alexander; Catherine Fitzgerald; Ainsley Gardiner
- Starring: Rangi Ngamoki; Hutini Waikato
- Cinematography: Adam Clark
- Edited by: Owen Ferrier-Kerr
- Music by: Craig Sengelow
- Production companies: Blueskin Films Ltd. Defender Films; New Zealand Film Commission
- Release dates: July 2003 (New Zealand International Film Festival); January 2004 (Sundance)
- Running time: 11 minutes
- Country: New Zealand
- Languages: English; Māori

External videos
- Two Cars, One Night, full film, YouTube video, on the official Searchlight Pictures channel.

Two Cars, One Night is a 2003 New Zealand short film written and directed by Taika Waititi.

The film is about two young boys and a girl meeting in the carpark of a rural pub in Te Kaha, New Zealand. What at first seems to be a relationship based on rivalry soon develops into a potential friendship.

== Plot ==
One night, the Te Kaha hotel pub carpark is parked by a sedan with nine-year-old boys Ed and Romeo in it.

As time passes, another sedan neighbours them, with the two adults, Koro and Tangata, exiting, leaving the child, 12-year-old Polly, alone. Romeo teases her, then vice versa. More time passes, and Romeo decides to know her more. In her car, Romeo finds out Polly has a plastic ring. As the parents exit the pub, Romeo and Polly express farewell. Polly gives the ring to Romeo, so that he will remember her, confiding that he will keep his promise to keep the ring. Romeo smiles and stands still looking at the car as it drives off.

== Reception ==
In 2017, Jacob Oller of Film School Rejects praised the film's humour, writing that the film "allowed Waititi the perfect (ahem) vehicles for his brand of undercutting comedy, a couple of brash kids, in a quiet, poignant setting."

== Awards ==
- 2004 Short Award at the AFI Film Festival
- 2004 Panorama Short Film Award, Berlin International Film Festival
- 2004 Hamburg Short Film Award, Hamburg International Short Film Festival
- 2004 Award of the Theatre Owners, Oberhausen International Short Film Festival
- 2004 Short Film Competition Award, Seattle International Film Festival
- 2004 Best Short Film Performance, NZ Film and TV Awards
- 2004 Best Short Film Screenplay, NZ Film and TV Awards
- 2004 Best Technical Contribution to Short Film, NZ Film and TV Awards
- 2004 Jury Award, Best Drama, Aspen Shortsfest

=== Nomination ===
- 2005 Nominated for Best Live Action Short Film, Academy Awards

In 2019, after receiving an Academy Award for Best Adapted Screenplay with Jojo Rabbit, Waititi said jokingly "Losing to Andrea Arnold [at the Oscars], it took me probably 13 years just to get over that. Because what she did to me back then, it was disrespectful. Although Wasp was an incredible short film, she didn’t need to do that. And look at me now, Andrea", the director deadpanned. "I played the long game, man. I played the long game".
