= Sue Crockford =

UK film maker and activist (1943–2019)

- Born: Susan Rosalind Crockford; 20 February 1943; London Borough of Croydon
- Died: 29 June 2019 (aged 76); London Borough of Camden
- Known for: film making and activism

Susan Rosalind Crockford (20 February 1943 – 29 June 2019) was a British film maker and activist.

== Life ==
Crockford was born in 1943 in the London Borough of Croydon. She was the first child of Patricia Maud (born Mead) and Herbert Edward Crockford who had both worked at the Land Registry before the war. Her father was a sergeant in the King's Royal Rifle Corps when she was born. He returned to work for the Land Registry when the war ended and there were two more children.

Crockford joined the University of Leeds to study art and English. Quentin Bell was their first Professor of Fine Art. He exceptionally allowed Crockford to study two film directors even though film was not yet regarded as an art form.

In 1968 she was one of the founding members of the Tufnell Park Women’s Liberation Group.

The first National Women's Liberation Conference was held from 27 February to 1 March 1970, and attracted over 600 women. Crockford later reported that it was an event where she realised that she was at a historic moment. She had to stand up and ask for permission to film it and she had to admit that most of her film crew were men. The Guardian called the conference [one of] the "biggest landmarks in British women's history". Permission was given and the conference and the creche were filmed by Crockford, Tony Wickert and Ellen Adams. They joined this footage with film from the following International Women's Day March to create the film, "A Woman's Place". It was Crockford's first film and the first film about Women's Liberation. She would go on to make 50 films, but she would also spend the next fourteen years running the Camden Town's youth centre in Somers Town.

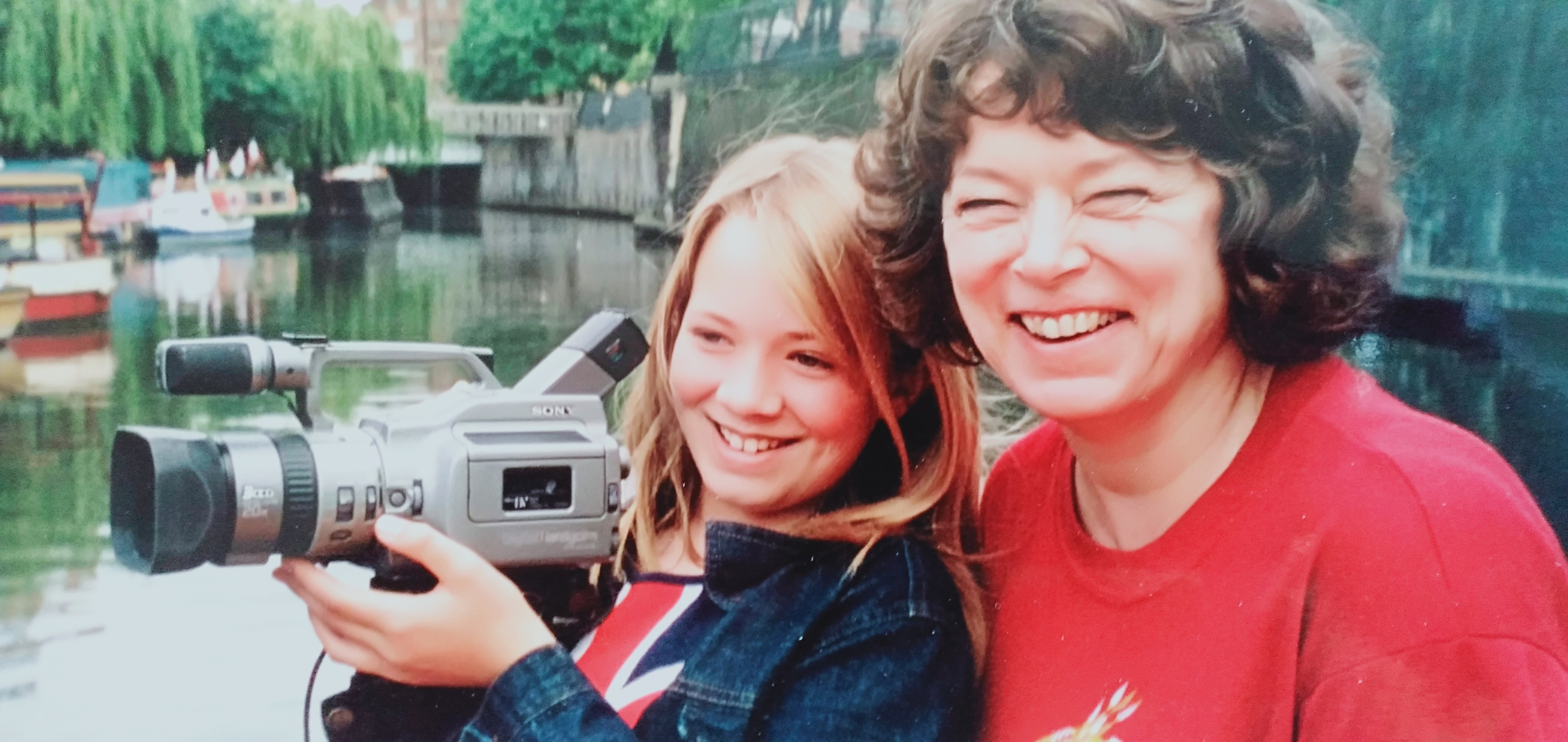
Sue Crockford co-directing the commended Tokyo Video Festival film 2003 "Masters of our Canal" with Lisson Green youth, the Pirate Castle and NZ Film maker Barry Thomas

In 1975 the Directory of Social Change was formed after Michael Norton's book was published. Crockford was a founding trustee and member for 35 years.

She directed a drama-documentary for a series on political protest for Channel 4 titled "The Rights of Man and the Wrongs of Woman" in 1989. The film starred Miranda Richardson as the writer Mary Wollstonecraft.

Crockford died of cancer in the London Borough of Camden in 2019.
