= 2025 Seattle International Film Festival =

Edition of film festival

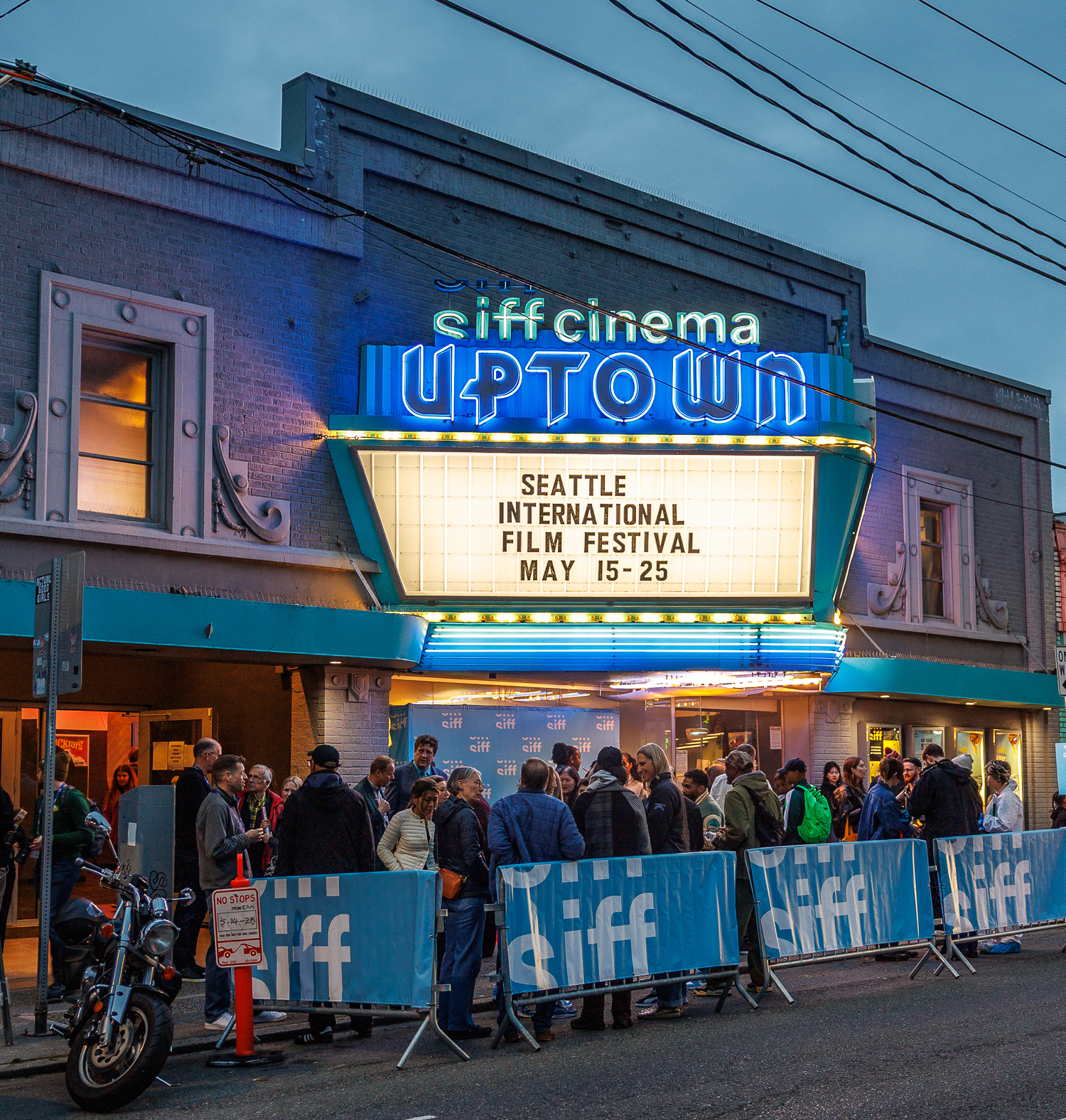
- Opening film: Four Mothers
- Closing film: Sorry, Baby
- Location: Seattle, Washington, U.S.
- Founded: 1976
- Hosted by: Seattle International Film Festival (SIFF)
- Festival date: May 15–25 in person; May 26–June 1 streaming
- Language: English
- Website: Seattle International Film Festival 2025
- 2026 Seattle International Film Festival 2024 Seattle International Film Festival

The 2025 Seattle International Film Festival is a film festival scheduled that was screened in theaters from May 15 to 25, 2025, and streaming May 26 to June 1, 2025. SIFF announced an initial six films on March 26 and the full lineup on April 23, 2025. The selections include 83 new and three archival narrative features, 35 documentaries, and 122 short films, for a total of "245 films from 74 different countries and regions." The theme for the 2025 festival is "Escape to the Reel World."

The festival occurred at various locations, including the SIFF Cinema Uptown (3 screens), the SIFF Cinema Downtown, the SIFF Film Center (a venue at Seattle Center), the AMC Theatres at Pacific Place, and Shoreline Community College Theater. Because of a water leak damaging the SIFF Egyptian Cinema in November 2024, SIFF could not schedule festival films in the 520-seat theater.

The opening, Four Mothers, was at the Paramount Theatre. The closing was Sorry, Baby at the SIFF Cinema Downtown followed by a gala party at MOHAI. The 2025 SIFF Awards ceremony took place at the Seattle Opera House on May 25, the last day of the in-person festival.

SIFF reported an attendance of 41,675 for the festival.

== Films ==
=== Narrative features ===
Narrative feature films screened at SIFF 2025
| English title | Director(s) | Production country | Premiere | Comp. | Ref. |
|---|---|---|---|---|---|
| 40 Acres | R. T. Thorne | Canada, United States | | | |
| April | Dea Kulumbegashvili | Georgia, France, Italy | | | |
| Auction | Pascal Bonitzer | France | | | |
| The Balconettes | Noémie Merlant | France | | | |
| Beef | Ingride Santos | Spain, Mexico | North American | IbA. | |
| Beginnings | Jeanette Nordahl | Denmark, Sweden, Belgium | North American | Dir. | |
| Bitter Gold | Juan Olea | Chile, Mexico, Uruguay, Germany | | IbA. | |
| BLKNWS: Terms & Conditions | Kahlil Joseph | United States | | Amer. | |
| Blue Sun Palace | Constance Tsang | United States | | | |
| Boong | Lakshmipriya Devi | India, France | | | |
| The Botanist | Jing Yi | China | | | |
| By Design | Amanda Kramer | United States | | | |
| By the Stream | Hong Sang-soo | South Korea, United States | | | |
| Cloud | Kiyoshi Kurosawa | Japan | | | |
| Color Book | David Fortune | United States | | Amer. | |
| Come Closer | Tom Nesher | Israel, Italy | | | |
| The Crowd | Sahand Kabiri | Iran | North American | Dir. | |
| Dancing Queen in Hollywood | Aurora Gossé | Norway | North American | | |
| The Dark Crystal | Jim Henson, Frank Oz | United States | | | |
| Dead Lover | Grace Glowicki | Canada | | | |
| Deaf | Eva Libertad | Spain | North American | IbA. | |
| Diamonds | Ferzan Özpetek | Italy | | | |
| Diciannove | Giovanni Tortorici | Italy, United Kingdom | | | |
| DJ Ahmet | Georgi M. Unkovski | North Macedonia, Czech Republic, Serbia, Croatia | | Dir. | |
| Don't Let's Go to the Dogs Tonight | Embeth Davidtz | South Africa | | | |
| Drowning Dry | Laurynas Bareiša | Lithuania, Latvia | | | |
| Evergreens | Jared Briley | United States | | | |
| Everybody Loves Touda | Nabil Ayouch | France, Morocco, Belgium, Denmark, Netherlands | | | |
| Familiar Touch | Sarah Friedland | United States | | | |
| Fly Me to the Moon | Sasha Chuk | Hong Kong | | | |
| Four Mothers | Darren Thornton | Ireland, United Kingdom | | | |
| Fucktoys | Annapurna Sriram | United States | | Amer. | |
| The Glass Web (in 3-D) | Jack Arnold | United States | | | |
| Good Boy | Ben Leonberg | United States | | | |
| Hanami | Denise Fernandes | Switzerland, Portugal, Cape Verde | | IbA. | |
| Happy Holidays | Scandar Copti | Palestine, Germany, France, Italy, Qatar | | | |
| Happyend | Neo Sora | Japan, United States | | | |
| Home Sweet Home | Frelle Petersen | Denmark | North American | Off. | |
| I Am Nevenka | Icíar Bollaín | Spain, Italy | | | |
| Idyllic | Aaron Rookus | Netherlands, Denmark, Belgium, Estonia | North American | | |
| Into the Wonderwoods | Alexis Ducord, Vincent Paronnaud | France, Luxembourg | | | |
| Invention | Courtney Stephens | United States | | Amer. | |
| John Cranko | Joachim A. Lang | Germany | | | |
| Joqtau | Aruan Anartay | Kazakhstan, China | North American | | |
| Ka Whawhai Tonu: Struggle Without End | Michael Jonathan | Aotearoa New Zealand, Great Britain | | | |
| The Kingdom | Julien Colonna | France | | | |
| Little Red Sweet | Vincent Chow | Hong Kong | | | |
| Luz | Flora Lau | Hong Kong | | | |
| Manas | Marianna Brennand | Brazil, Portugal | | IbA. | |
| Meeting with Pol Pot | Rithy Panh | France, Cambodia, Taiwan, Qatar, Turkey | | | |
| Monarch City | Titus Richard | United States | World | | |
| Mongrels | Jerome Yoo | Canada | | Dir. | |
| Moon | Kurdwin Ayub | Austria | U.S. | | |
| The Nature of Invisible Things | Rafaela Camelo | Brazil, Chile | North American | | |
| New Jack Fury | Lanfia Wal | United States | | | |
| The New Year That Never Came | Bogdan Mureșanu | Romania, Serbia | | | |
| Odd Fish | Snævar Sölvi Sölvason | Iceland, Finland, Germany | | | |
| Paying For It | Sook-Yin Lee | Canada, United States | U.S. | | |
| Raptures | Jon Blåhed | Sweden, Finland | North American | Off. | |
| Ready or Not | Claire Frances Byrne | Ireland | North American | Dir. | |
| Rebuilding | Max Walker-Silverman | United States | | Off. | |
| The Safe House | Lionel Baier | Switzerland, Luxembourg, France | North American | Off. | |
| Sanatorium Under the Sign of the Hourglass | Stephen and Timothy Quay | United Kingdom, Poland, Germany | U.S. | | |
| Scarecrow in a Garden of Cucumbers | Robert J. Kaplan | United States | | | |
| She's the He | Siobhan McCarthy | United States | | Amer. | |
| Shepherds | Sophie Deraspe | Canada (Quèbec), France | | | |
| Slanted | Amy Wong | United States | | | |
| Sons | Gustav Möller | Denmark, Sweden | | | |
| Sorry, Baby | Eva Victor | United States | | | |
| Souleymane's Story | Boris Lojkine | France | | | |
| Spermageddon | Tommy Wirkola, Rasmus A. Sivertsen | Norway | | | |
| Sudden Outbursts of Emotions | Paula Korva | Finland, Denmark | North American | | |
| Summer's Camera | Divine Sung | South Korea | North American | Off. | |
| Tales From the Magic Garden | David Súkup, Patrik Pašš, Leon Vidmar, Jean-Claude Rozec | Czech Republic, Slovakia, Slovenia, France | North American | | |
| The Things You Kill | Alireza Khatami | Canada, Belgium | | | |
| Time Travel Is Dangerous | Chris Reading | United Kingdom | | | |
| Tinā | Miki Magasiva | Aotearoa New Zealand | | | |
| To a Land Unknown | Mahdi Fleifel | Greece, Denmark, United Kingdom, Netherlands | | | |
| To Kill a Mongolian Horse | Jiang Xiaoxuan | Malaysia, Hong Kong, South Korea, Japan, Saudi Arabia, Thailand, United States | | Dir. | |
| Twinless | James Sweeney | United States | | | |
| U Are the Universe | Pavlo Ostrikov | Ukraine, Belgium | | | |
| Under the Volcano | Damian Kocur | Poland | | | |
| Undercover | Arantxa Echevarría | Spain | | IbA. | |
| The Village Next to Paradise | Mo Harawe | Somalia, Austria, France, Germany | | Dir. | |
| The Wailing | Pedro Martín-Calero | Spain, France, Argentina | | | |
| Waves | Jiří Mádl | Czech Republic, Slovakia | | | |

=== Documentary features ===
Documentary feature films screened at SIFF 2025
| English title | Director(s) | Production country | Premiere | Comp. | Ref. |
|---|---|---|---|---|---|
| 1-800-ON-HER-OWN | Dana Flor | United States | | | |
| Baby Doe | Jessica Earnshaw | United States | | | |
| BAR | Don Hardy | United States | | | |
| Between Goodbyes | Jota Mun | United States, South Korea | | Doc. | |
| Billy | Lawrence Côté-Collins | Canada (Québec), Finland | | Doc. | |
| Blue Road: The Edna O'Brien Story | Sinéad O'Shea | Ireland, United Kingdom | | | |
| Cat Town, United States | Jonathan Napolitano | United States | World | | |
| Chain Reactions | Alexandre O. Philippe | United States | | | |
| The Chef and the Daruma | Mads K. Baekkevold | Canada, Japan | U.S. | | |
| Coexistence, My Ass! | Amber Fares | United States, France | | | |
| Come See Me in the Good Light | Ryan White | United States | | | |
| Drowned Land | Colleen Thurston | United States | | Doc. | |
| Flamingos: Life After the Meteorite | Lorenzo Hagerman | Mexico | | | |
| Free Leonard Peltier | Jesse Short Bull, David France | United States | | | |
| Freeing Juanita | Sebastián Lasaosa Rogers | United States, Mexico, Guatemala | U.S. | Doc. | |
| The Gloria of your Imagination | Jennifer Reeves | United States | | | |
| Heightened Scrutiny | Sam Feder | United States | | | |
| How to Build a Library | Maia Lekow, Christopher King | Kenya | | | |
| Jean Cocteau | Lisa Immordino Vreeland | United States | | | |
| Khartoum | Anas Saeed, Rawia Alhag, Brahim Snoopy, Timeea Mohamed Ahmed, Philip Cox | Sudan, UK, Germany, Qatar | | | |
| Know Her Name | Zainab Muse | Canada | U.S. | | |
| The Librarians | Kim A. Snyder | United States | | Doc. | |
| Monk in Pieces | Billy Shebar, David Roberts | United States, Germany, France | North American | | |
| Paul Anka: His Way | John Maggio | United States | | | |
| Remaining Native | Paige Bethmann | United States | | Off. | |
| Riefenstahl | Andres Veiel | Germany | | | |
| Sally | Cristina Costantini | United States | | | |
| Salsa Lives | Juan Carvajal | Colombia | | | |
| Seeds | Brittany Shyne | United States | | Off. | |
| Starman | Robert Stone | United States | | | |
| Suburban Fury | Robinson Devor | United States | | Doc. | |
| Transfers | Nicolás Gil Lavedra | Argentina, Uruguay | | IbA. | |
| Unclickable | Babis Makridis | Greece, Cyprus, United States | North American | Doc. | |
| Viktor | Olivier Sarbil | Denmark, Ukraine, France, United States | | Doc. | |
| Wolf Land | Sarah Hoffman | United States | World | | |

=== Shorts ===
Short films screened at SIFF 2024
| English title | Director(s) | Production country | Premiere | Ref. |
|---|---|---|---|---|
| 5 Cousins & the Creek | Yen-Shi Chen | Taiwan | North American | |
| A is for Ant | Jack Davison | United Kingdom | | |
| Above The Clouds | Alani Sanders | United States | | |
| Abuela's Cookbook | Isabel Kembel-Rodriguez | United States | | |
| Acting Out | Mellony Ledo | Australia, United States | North American | |
| Ada | Ceylan Ozgun Ozcelik | Turkey | World | |
| Ajar | Atefeh Jalali | Iran, Spain | | |
| Arman | Farzad Kiyafar | United States | | |
| As You Are'' | Daria Strachan | United States | | |
| The Blue Diamond | Sam Fox | United States | | |
| Bozo Over Roses | Matty Sidle | United States, Hungary | | |
| Buscando Alma | Melissa Fisher | United States | | |
| The Call | Kelly Sears | United States | World | |
| Civilized | Marc Fussing Rosbach | Norway, Greenland | U.S. | |
| Counterweight | Austin Wilson, Christian Sorensen Hansen | United States | World | |
| Dancing in Tomorrowland | Jakob Roston | United States | North American | |
| Detours Ahead | Esther Cheung | Canada | | |
| Did you take the chicken out of the freezer? | Mayra Elize Estrada | United States | | |
| The Distance | Tommy Heffernan, Sean Nguyen | United States | | |
| Dormilón | Olivia Marie Valdez | United States | | |
| Dragfox | Lisa Ott | United Kingdom | | |
| Dynasty and Destiny | Travis Lee Ratcliff | United States | | |
| The Eating of an Orange | May Kindred-Boothby | United Kingdom | | |
| Éiru | Giovanna Ferrari | Ireland | | |
| Eras | Anna Samuels | United States | | |
| Fantas | Halima Elkhatabi | Canada (Québec) | | |
| Far Away | Emily Murnane | United States | World | |
| Favours | Agnes Skonare | Sweden | | |
| Felina | María Lorenzo | Spain | | |
| Field Recording | Quinne Larsen | United States | | |
| The First | Susan Ruth | United States | | |
| Five Star | Kai Hasson | United States | | |
| The Garden Sees Fire | Kiera Faber | United States | | |
| Glass Quest | Georgia Krause | United States | World | |
| Goodnight Lucy! | Alex Batchelor | United States | | |
| The Great Cherokee Grandmother | Anthony Sneed | United States | | |
| Grizzy and the Lemmings World Tour (Season 4) - Iced Grizzy | Camille Scarella | France | U.S. | |
| Handwoven | Mason Cazalet, Dasha Levin, Mihika Das, Matthew Wisdom | United States | | |
| Harbor | Samantha Jackson | United States | | |
| Heaven is Nobody's | Hector Prats | Spain | | |
| Humantis | Paris Baillie | United States | | |
| Hydraulic | Nicole Hutton-Lewis | Australia | U.S. | |
| I Could Dom | Madison Hatfield | United States | | |
| In My Hand | Liselotte Wajstedt, Marja Helander | Norway, Sweden, Finland | U.S. | |
| In the Shallows | Arash Akhgari | Canada | | |
| Inkwo for When the Starving Return | Amanda Strong | Canada | | |
| ISAAC | Trip Breslin | United States | | |
| Jesus 2 | Jesse Moynihan | United States | | |
| Kisses and Bullets | Faranak Sahafian | United States, Iran | | |
| Last Night | Oliver Zel | United States | | |
| Late For The Orgy | Nesib C.B. Shamah | United States | World | |
| LEES WAXUL | Yoro Mbaye | Senegal, France | | |
| Little Haiti, Miami, United States | X.F. Serrano | United States | | |
| The Little Prince | Aaron Russell, Colton McMurray | United States | World | |
| Little Shrew (Snowflake) | Kate Bush | United Kingdom | | |
| The Lonely Life of Lint | Sarah Sklar | United States | | |
| Majonezë | Giulia Grandinetti | Italy | North American | |
| Masks | Andre LeBlanc | United States | | |
| THE MECHANIZATION OF MAN | Eion Nunez | United States | | |
| Medusa | Sarah Meyohas | United States, France | | |
| Mine! | Lou Morton | United States | | |
| Mother's Child | Naomi Noir | Netherlands | | |
| Mr. Static | Mike Williamson | United States | U.S. | |
| Munkha | Alexander Moruo, Markel Martynov | Russia, Kazakhstan | | |
| My Boo | Stephanie J. Röst | United States | | |
| My Dad Asked Me What Acid Felt Like | Aric Allen | United States | | |
| My Teenage Blackout | Basile Khatir | France | | |
| Nervous Energy | Eve Liu | United States | | |
| On the high seas. Part 1: The burgeoning decision to go on a journey willy-nilly | Ralf Petersen | Austria | U.S. | |
| On Weary Wings Go By | Anu-Laura Tuttelberg | Estonia | | |
| One Day This Kid | Alexander Farah | Canada | | |
| The One Who Knows | Egle Davidavice | Lithuania, France | | |
| The Orange at the Seder | Jacob Combs | United States | | |
| Overcast | Amy Cheng | United States | U.S. | |
| Paradise Man (ii) | Jordan Michael Blake | United States | | |
| Patterns | Alex Glawion | Germany | | |
| Peppermint Diesel 20% | Mariangela Pluchino | Finland | North American | |
| Percebes | Alexandra Ramires, Laura Gonçalves | Portugal, France | | |
| Pow! | Joey Clift | United States | | |
| Quota | Job Roggeveen, Joris Oprins, Marieke Blaauw | Netherlands | | |
| Ragamuffin | Kaitlyn Mikayla | United States | | |
| RAT! | Neal Suresh Mulani | United States | | |
| Rat Rod | Jared Jakins, Carly Jakins | United States | | |
| Red Peter | Joo-Hyun Woo | South Korea | | |
| Red-Shaded Green | Johannes Vang | Norway | North American | |
| Retirement Plan | John Kelly | Ireland | | |
| The Sacred Society | Benny Zelkowicz | United States | | |
| Saturn Risin9 | Tiare Ribeaux, Jody Stillwater | United States | | |
| Seventh Heaven | Syrus Gupta, Davis Knocke | United States | World | |
| She Dolls with Dollies | Karin Fisslthaler | Austria | | |
| Shelly’s Leg | Wes Hurley | United States | World | |
| Sins of a Father | Nuekellar Hardy | United States | | |
| Sirènes | Sarah Malléon | Martinique | | |
| Slush | Ashley George | United States | | |
| Something Blue | Samantha Nisenboim | United States | | |
| Speak with the Dead | Stephanie Paris | United States | | |
| Speed Queen 51 | Sarah Nocquet | France | | |
| The Spells That Bind Us | Ellie Nishino | United States | World | |
| STARGAZER | Justin Robert Vinall | United States | World | |
| STOMACH BUG | Matty Crawford | United Kingdom | | |
| Style: A Seattle Basketball Story | Bryan Tucker | United States | World | |
| Sublime | Marie Heribel, Candice Yernaux, Juliette Buysschaert, Camille Leroy, Joséphine Vendeville, Martin Laurent, Lucas Foutrier | France | | |
| This is a Story About Salmon | Princess Daazhraii Johnson | United States | North American | |
| Threaded | Naaman Azhari | United Kingdom | | |
| Tiger | Loren Water | United States | | |
| To The Max | Sundiata Enuke | United States | | |
| Two Black Boys in Paradise | Baz Sells | United Kingdom | | |
| Two Dreams | Salise Hughes | United States | World | |
| Two People Exchanging Saliva | Alexandre Singh, Natalie Musteata | France, United States | | |
| Unibrow | Nedda Sarshar | Canada | | |
| View From the Floor | Megan Griffiths, Mindie Lind | United States | | |
| Vox Humana | Don Josephus Raphael Eblahan | Philippines, United States, Singapore | | |
| Waska: The Forest Is My Family | Nina Gualinga, Eli Virkina, Boloh Miranda | Ecuador | | |
| We Were the Scenery | Christopher Radcliff | United States | | |
| The Wedding Veil of the Proud Princess | Anna-Ester Volozh | United Kingdom | | |
| West Shore | Jordan Riber, Jon Carroll | United States | | |
| Where | Ziquan Wang | China | | |
| The Wish | Francesca Varese | Mexico, United States | | |
| Xiaonan and the Hatching Chicken Factory | Cheng-Jun Liu, Zi-Ching Yen, Ching-Sheng Chang, Yung-Chih Chang | Taiwan | | |
| Your Own Flavor | Alisha Ketry | United States | World | |
| Yours and Mine | Quinn Yurasek | United States | World | |

== Film competitions and programs ==
There are several juried competitions for prequalified films:

- Official Competition
- Documentary Competition
- Ibero-American Competition
- New American Cinema Competition
- New Directors Competition

There is a juried competition for short films that has three categories, Live Action, Animation, and Documentary. All three categories qualify these films for the corresponding categories for the Academy Awards.

There are also the Golden Space Needle Awards, which are audience choices for "Best Film, Documentary Feature, Director, Performance, and Short Film."

=== Juried Competition Awards ===
Jurors served several different juries. For feature films, there were juries for the official competition, new directors, new American cinema, Ibero-American, and documentaries. There were two short film juries, one for narrative films and another for documentary and animated films.

==== Feature films ====
Juried Competition Award winners for feature films
| Award | Film title | Director(s) | Country |
|---|---|---|---|
| Official Competition Grand Jury Prize | Seeds | Brittany Shyne | United States |
| Official Competition Special Jury Mention | The New Year That Never Came | Bogdan Mureșanu | Romania/Serbia |
| Ibero-American Competition Grand Jury Prize | Deaf | Eva Libertad | Spain |
| Ibero-American Special Jury Mention | Transfers | Nicolás Gil Lavedra | Argentina/Uruguay |
| New Directors Competition Grand Jury Prize | The Crowd | Sahand Kabiri | Iran |
| New Directors Competition Special Jury Mention | DJ Ahmet | Georgi M. Unkovski | North Macedonia/Czech Republic/Serbia/Croatia |
| New American Cinema Competition Grand Jury Prize | Invention | Courtney Stephens | United States |
| Documentary Competition Grand Jury Prize | Suburban Fury | Robinson Devor | United States |
| Documentary Competition Special Jury Mention | Billy | Lawrence Côté-Collins | Canada (Québec)/Finland |
| Wavemaker Award: Best Futurewave Feature | Summer's Camera | Divine Sung | South Korea |

==== Short films ====
Juried Competition Award winners for short films
| Award | Film title | Director(s) | Country |
|---|---|---|---|
| Live Action Short Grand Jury Prize | Medusa | Sarah Meyohas | United States |
| Live Action Short Special Jury Mention | Majonezë | Giulia Grandinetti | Italy |
| Documentary Short Grand Jury Prize | Rat Rod | Jared Jakins, Carly Jakins | United States |
| Documentary Short Grand Jury Mention | Style: A Seattle Basketball Story | Bryan Tucker | United States |
| Animated Short Grand Jury Prize | The Eating of an Orange | May Kindred-Boothby | United Kingdom |
| Animated Short Grand Jury Mention | View From the Floor | Megan Griffiths, Mindie Lind | United States |

=== Golden Space Needle Awards ===
The Golden Space Needle Awards are voted by the audience.

Golden Space Needle Awards winners
| Award | Film title | Director(s) | Country |
|---|---|---|---|
| Best Film | Tinā | Miki Magasiva | New Zealand |
| Best Documentary | Come See Me in the Good Light | Ryan White | United States |
| Best Director | Twinless | James Sweeney | United States |
| Best Performance | Souleymane's Story | Abou Sangaré | France |
| Best Short | Five Star | Kai Hasson | United States |

There was also a "Very Special Mention for Indy the dog" who appeared in Good Boy. (Ben Leonberg, director; United States)

=== Additional awards ===
Additional award winners
| Award | Film title | Director(s) | Country |
|---|---|---|---|
| 2025 Seattle Film Critics Society Feature Film Award | Sorry, Baby | Eva Victor | United States |
| Lena Sharpe Award for Persistence of Vision | The Librarians | Kim A. Snyder | United States |

FOOL Serious, an "officially unofficial un-organization of the Seattle International Film Festival‘s passholders" also had their own awards for the 2025 festival.

== Gallery ==
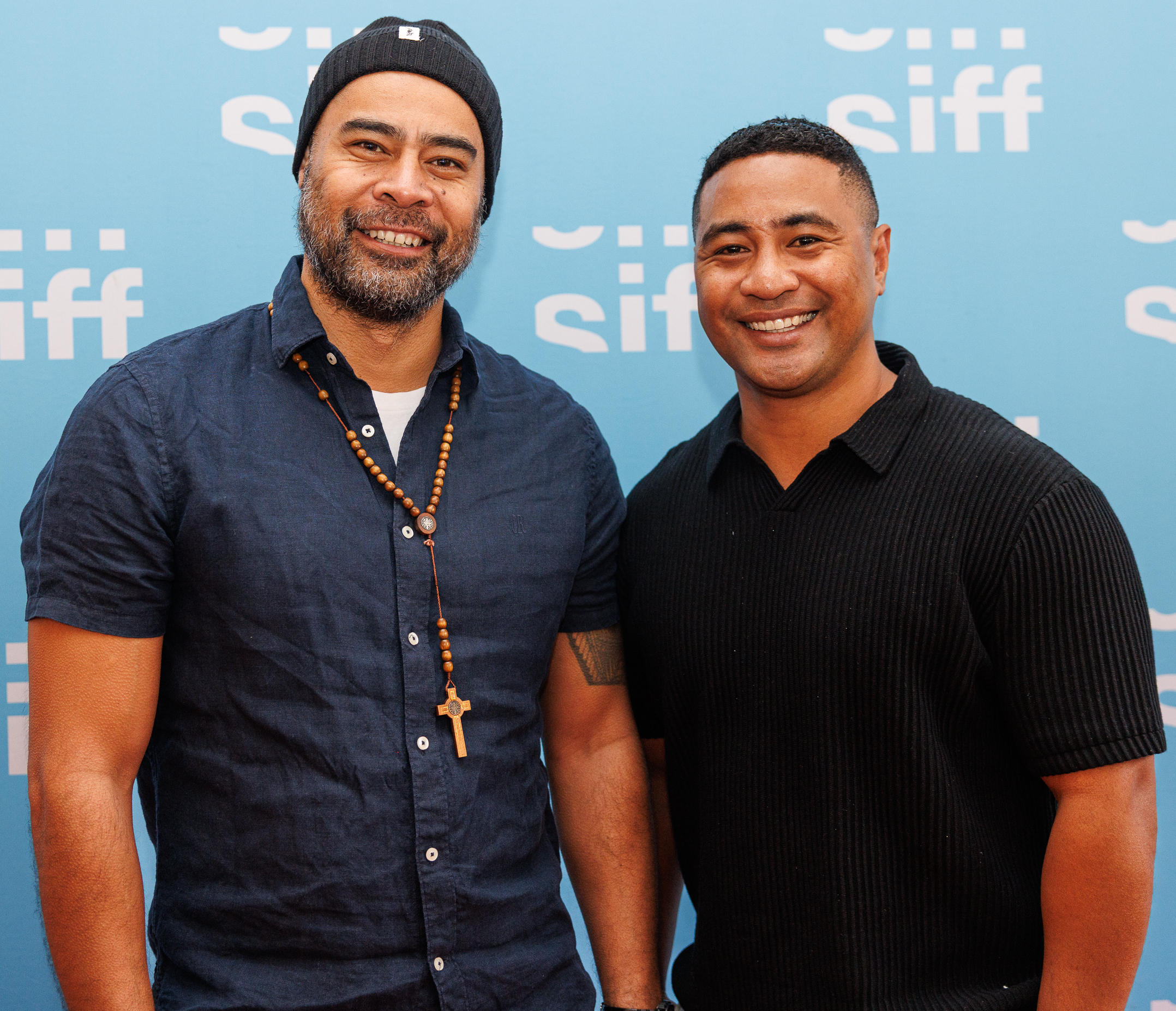
Tinā director Miki Magasiva and actor Beulah Koale

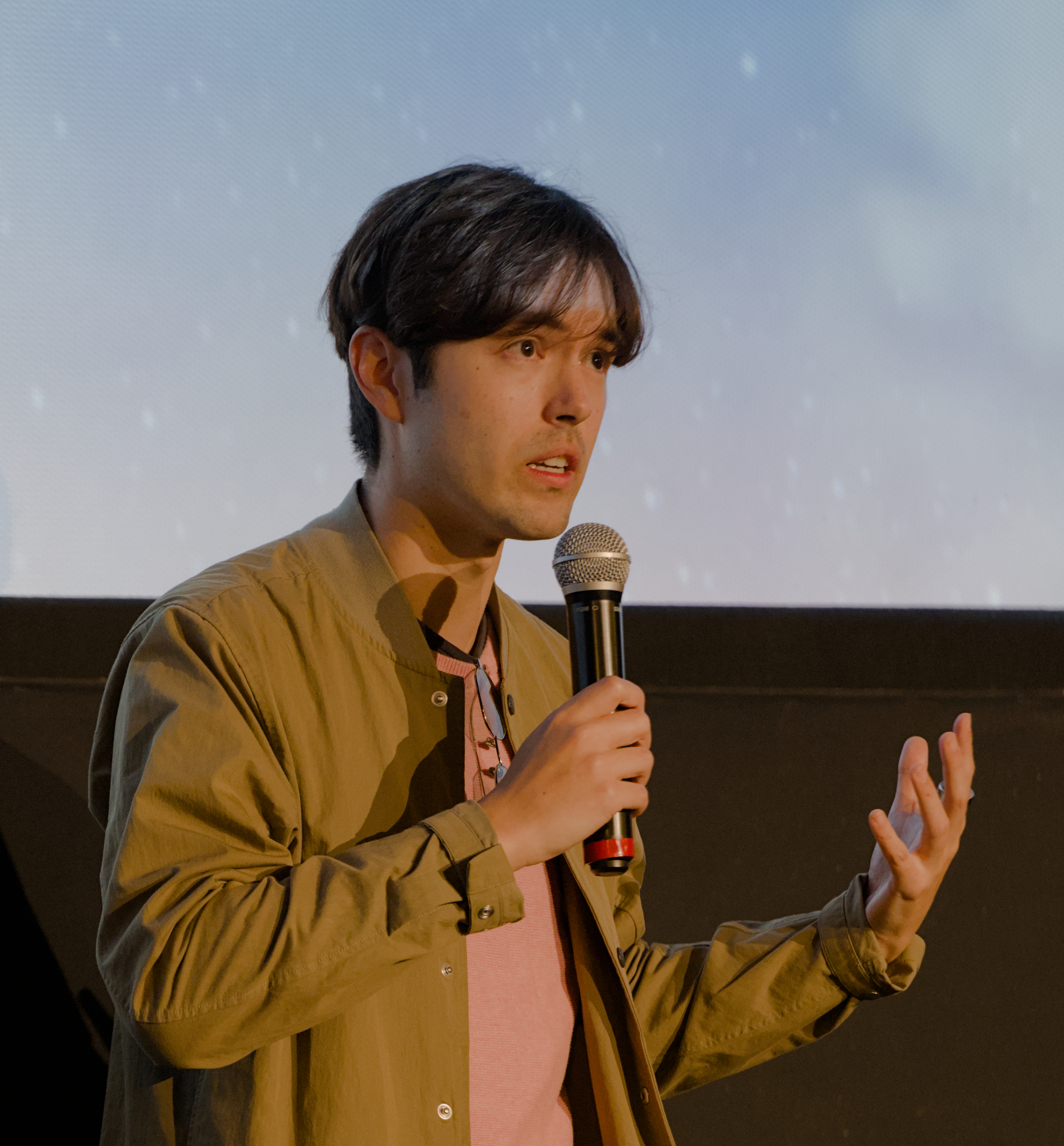
Twinless director James Sweeney

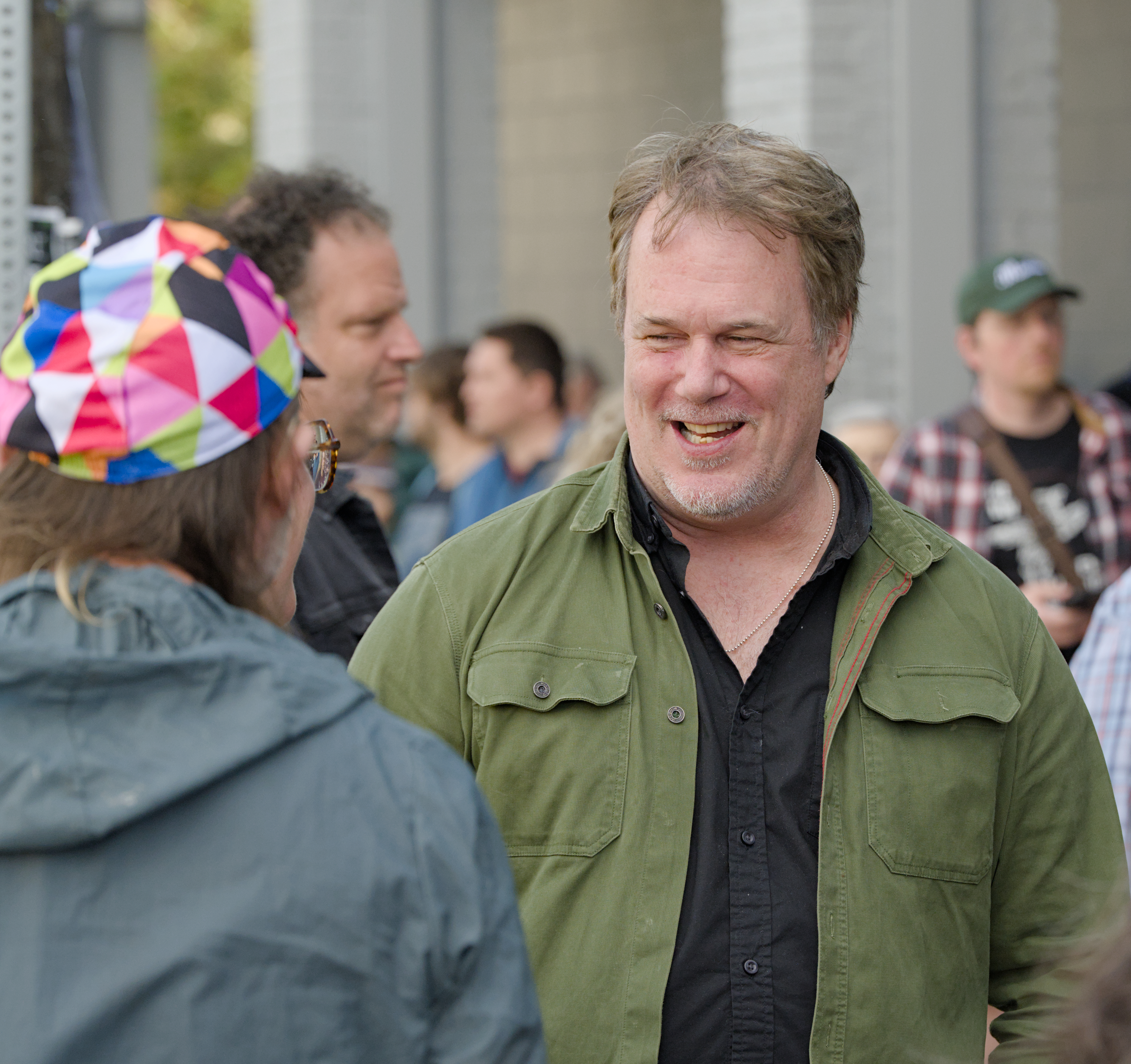
Suburban Fury director Robinson Devor talking with a fan

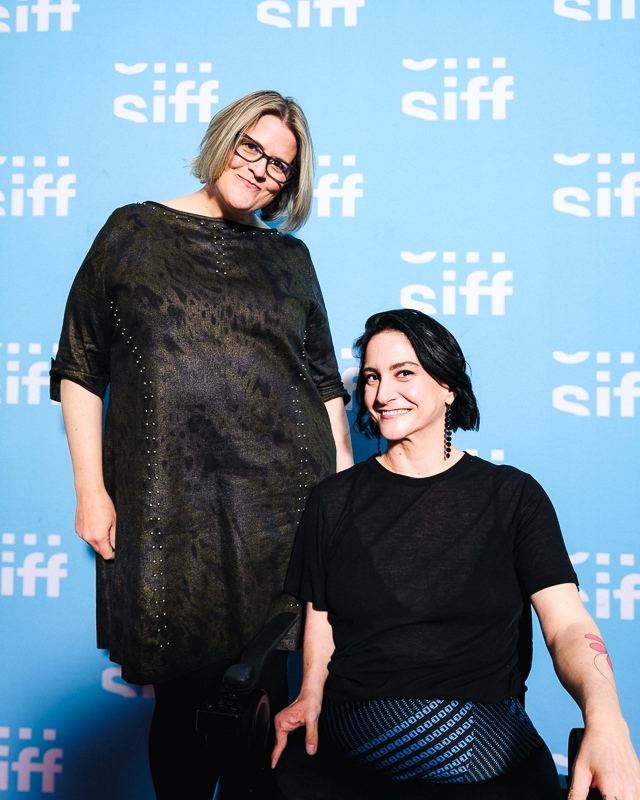
View From the Floor directors Megan Griffiths and Mindie Lind

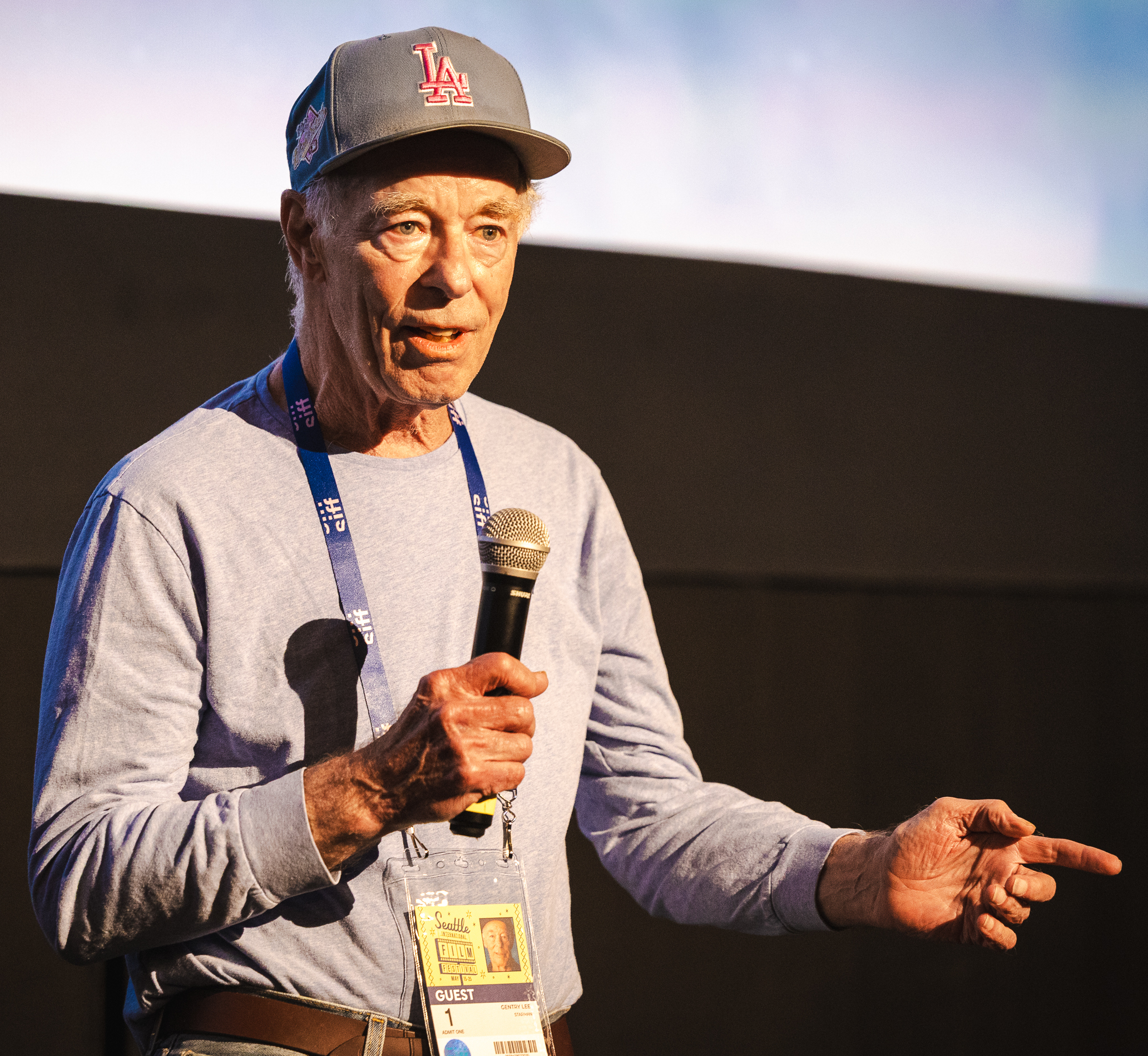
Gentry Lee, astrophysicist and subject of Starman

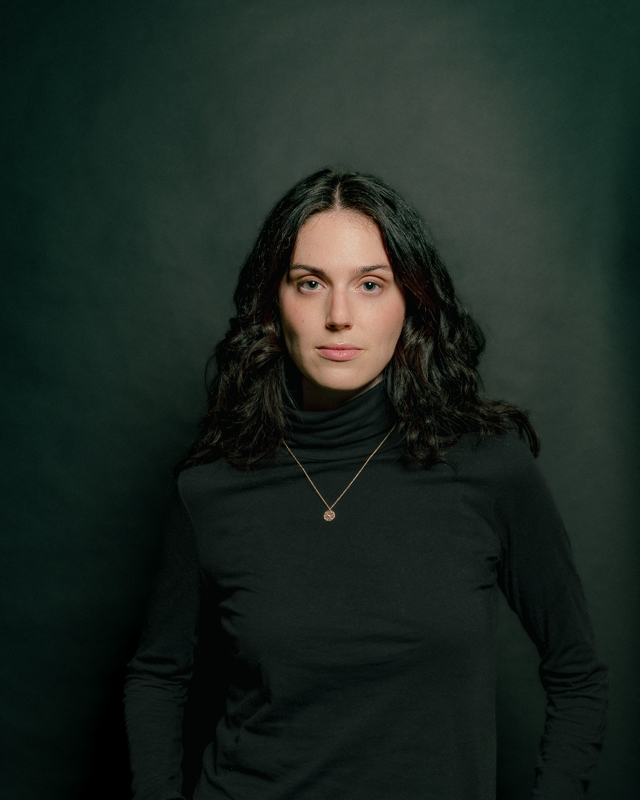
Sorry, Baby director, writer, and lead performer Eva Victor

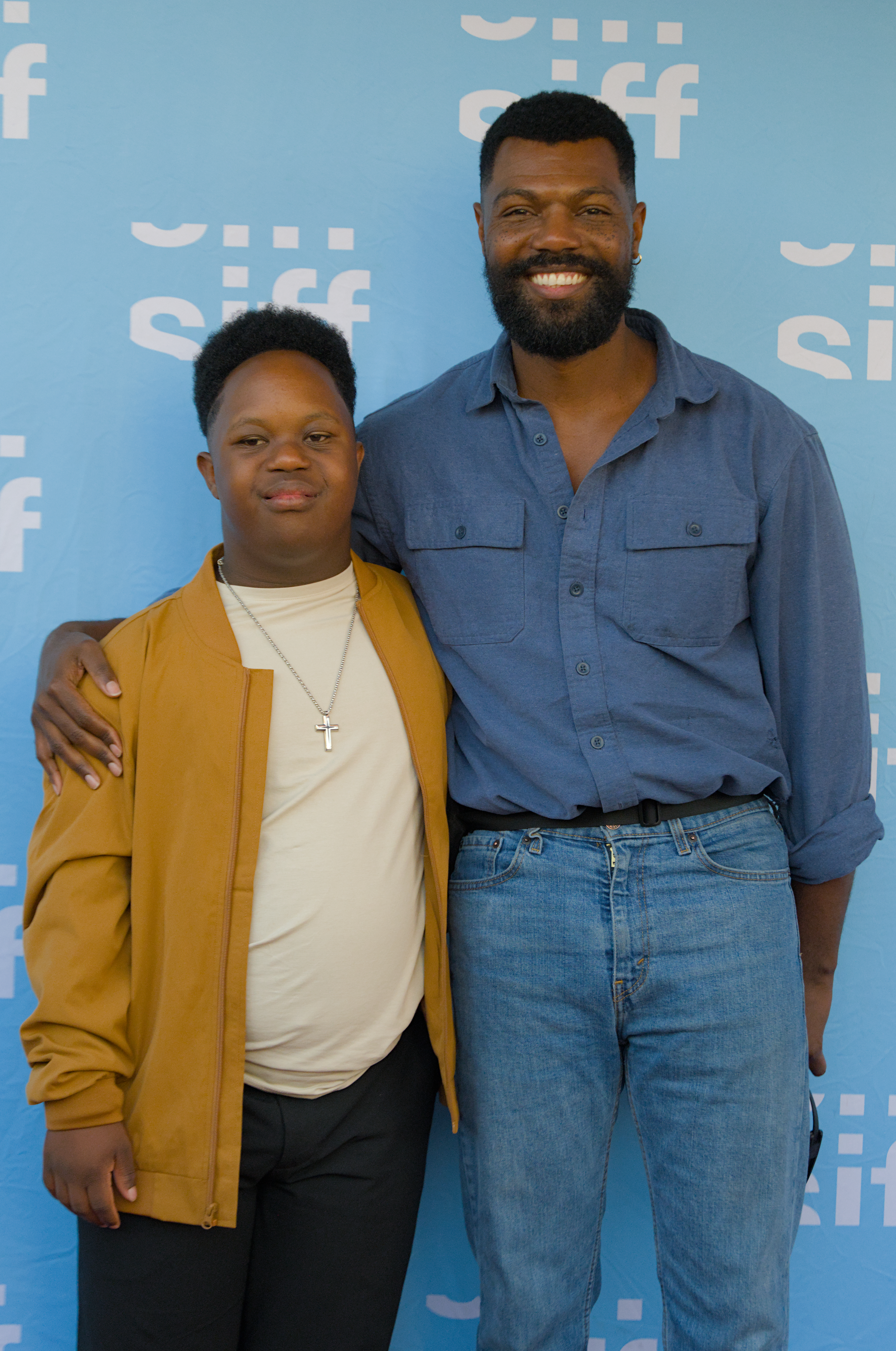
Color Book actors Jeremiah Daniels and Will Catlett

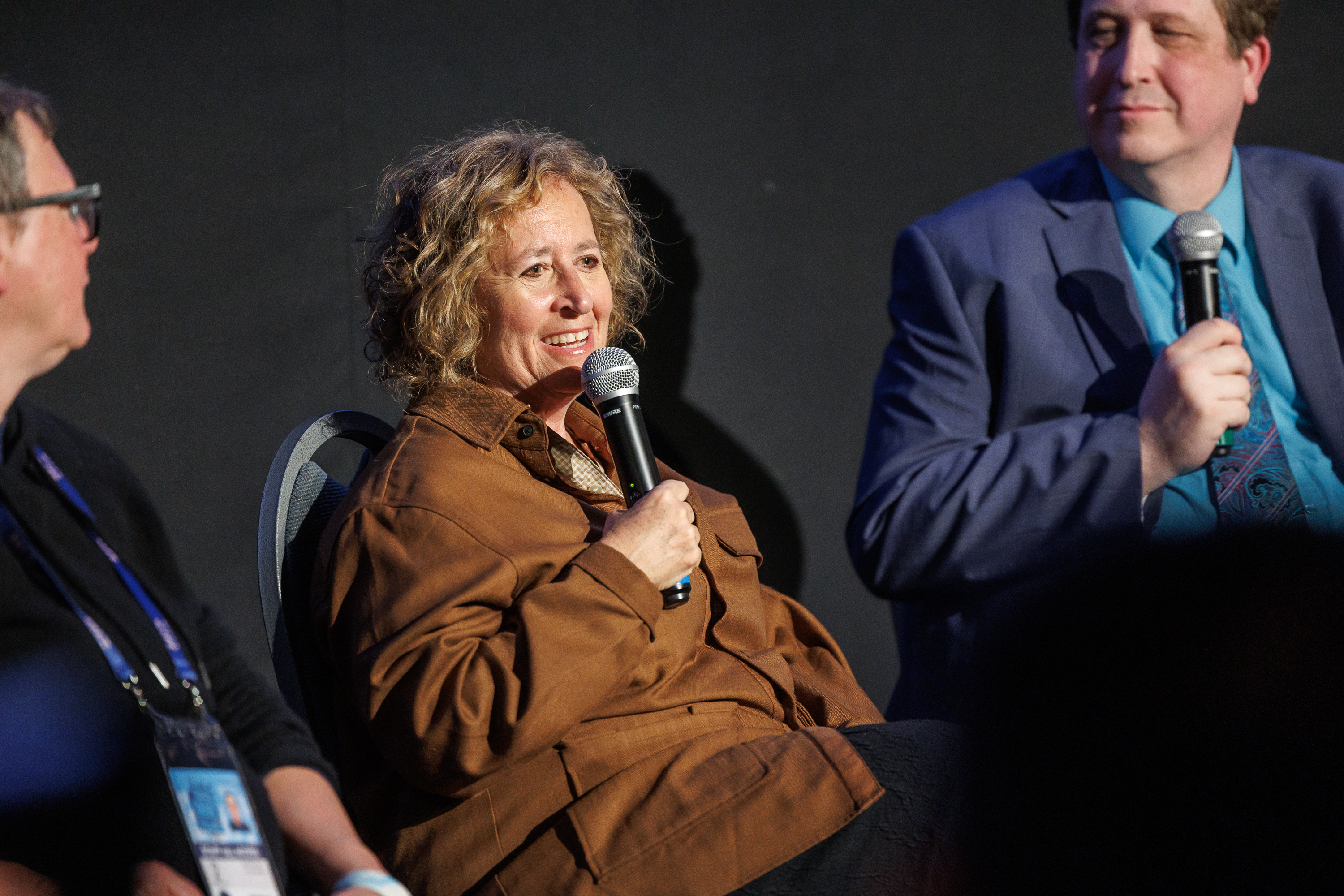
The Librarians director Kim A. Snyder answering questions

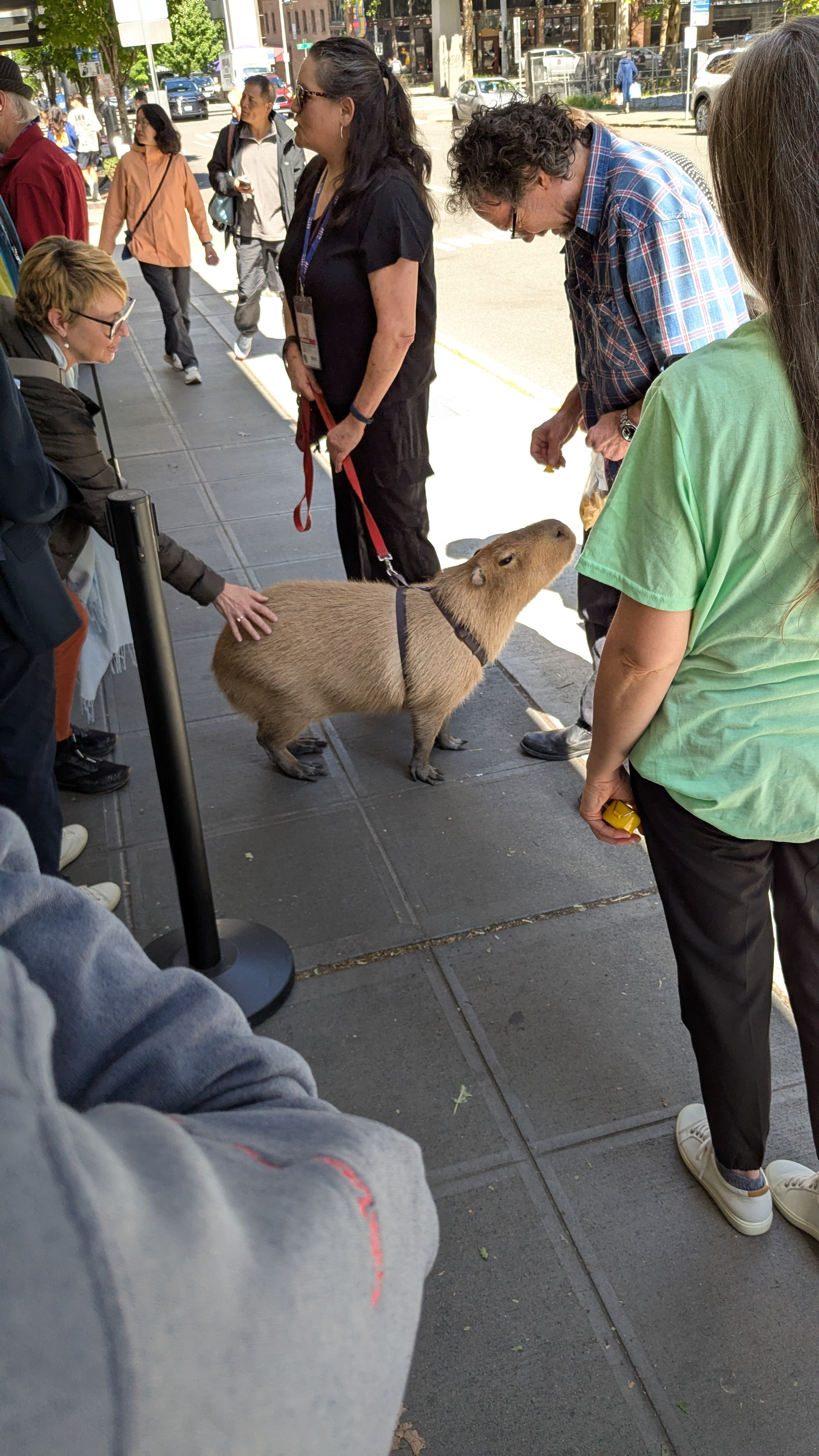
A capybara by a SIFF Downtown queue

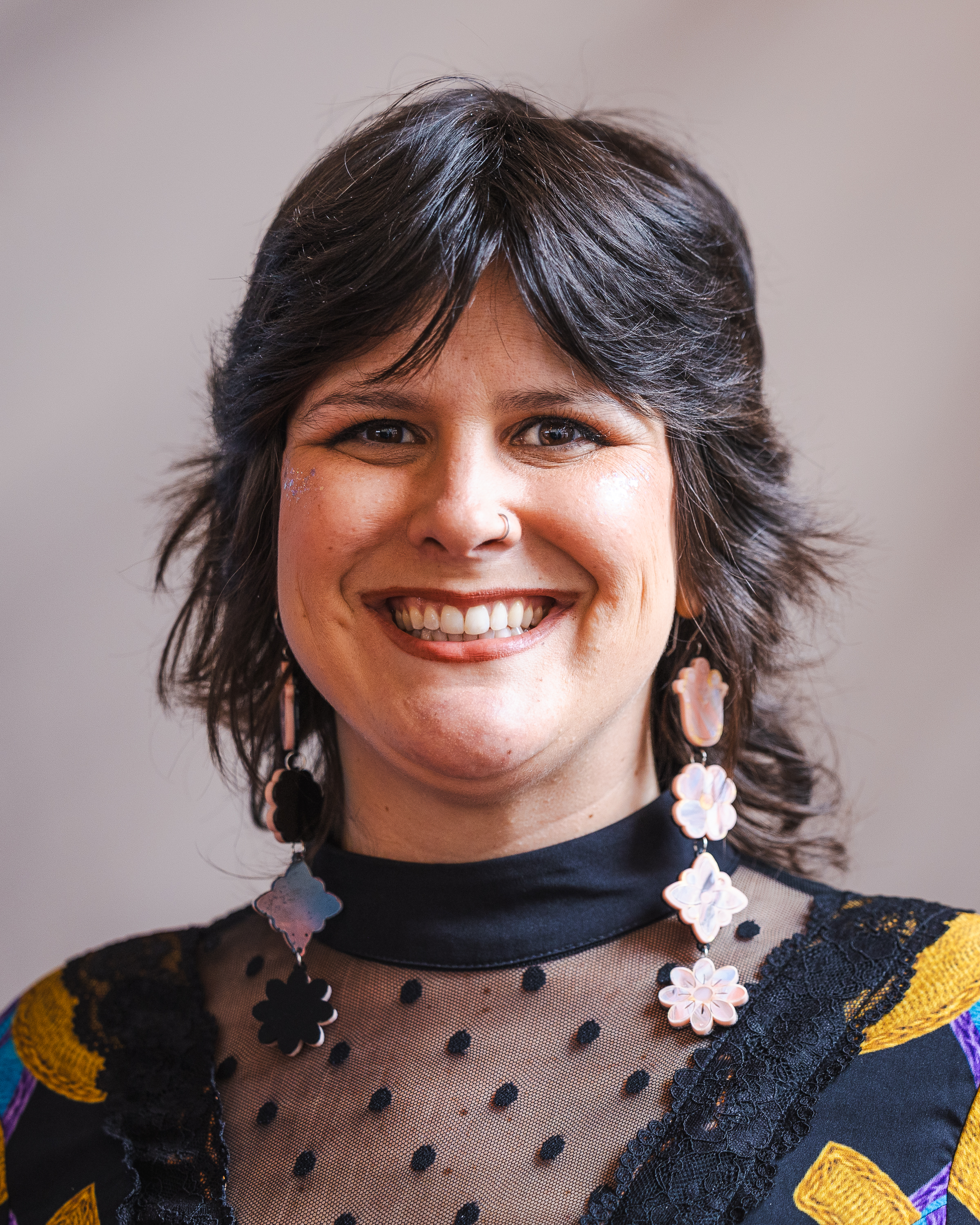
Drowned Land director Colleen Thurston
