= Ingride Santos =

Spanish film director and screenwriter (born 1983)

- Santos in 2025
- Born: Ingride Santos Piñol; 1983 (age 42–43)
- Education: Cinema and Audiovisual School of Catalonia
- Occupations: Film director; screenwriter
- Notable work: Beef (2019); Ruido (2025)

Ingride Santos Piñol (born 1983) is a Spanish film director and screenwriter. She directed the short film Beef (2019), which was nominated at the 35th Goya Awards in 2021; her feature debut, Ruido (2025), earned her the Best Director and New Filmmaker awards at the Toulouse Spanish Film Festival.

== Early life and career ==
Ingride Santos Piñol was born in 1983. She graduated in production from the Cinema and Audiovisual School of Catalonia (ESCAC), where she later taught.

After university, Santos joined the production company Escándalo Films, where she worked on Elena Trapé's Blog, Kike Maíllo's Eva and Juanjo Sáez's animated series Arroz Pasado. She began teaching New Formats at ESCAC in 2008 and started directing commercials in 2014.

== Beef ==
Santos co-wrote Beef with Lluís Segura and directed the 13-minute short film, which starred Melisa Peralta and Ruth Gabriel. It follows Melisa, a secondary school student who challenges her teacher and the school system during a literature exam. Produced by Isabel Coixet, it premiered at the 2019 Valladolid International Film Festival (Seminci).

Beef won the HBO Ibero-American Short Film Award at the 2020 Miami Film Festival, and Santos shared the Best Director prize at that year's Alicante Film Festival. At the 35th Goya Awards in 2021, Beef was nominated for Best Fictional Short Film; the award went to A la cara.

== Ruido ==
Santos's first feature, Ruido, was released internationally as Beef. She began developing it after discovering self-organised freestyle rap battles in Barcelona's Sants neighbourhood during the making of Beef. Santos described her approach as docufiction, with real locations and elements drawn from Latifa Drame's life. For four years, she researched freestyle and urban music, attended battles in Barcelona and gained the trust of participants.

Latifa Drame and Judith Álvarez were cast after more than 100 interviews with rappers and battle organisers. Both made their film debuts, while Asaari Bibang played Lati's mother. Santos and the two leads spent nine months on improvisation and tests before filming.

Santos co-wrote the screenplay with Lluís Segura, with cinematography by Beatriz Sastre and music by Cookin Soul; Sábado Películas, Playtime Movies and Filmin produced the Spanish-Mexican co-production. The film follows Lati, a young rapper whose father has died and whose Muslim mother disapproves of her ambition; she trains secretly with Judy, a former freestyle competitor.

Ruido premiered in the official section of the 28th Málaga Film Festival and later screened in competition at the 2025 Seattle International Film Festival and in the Visionaries section of SXSW London. At the 2025 Toulouse Spanish Film Festival, Santos won Best Director and New Filmmaker, while Sastre won Best Cinematography. The film opened in Spanish cinemas on 28 November 2025.

Carmen L. Lobo of La Razón called it an honest debut and praised Drame's committed performance, but wrote that the story could have gone further with more ambition. The review in La Opinión de Málaga found the film lacking in force and compared its plot to The Karate Kid with rappers.
