= Wanjiru Koinange (author) =

Kenyan writer and social entrepreneur

- Occupations: Writer and Social Entrepreneur
- Known for: Co-founding Book Bunk, Author of The Havoc of Choice

Wanjiru Koinange is a Kenyan writer, and social entrepreneur. She is the co-founder of the Book Bunk, a non-profit organization that is dedicated to restoring and revitalizing Nairobi's public libraries. Her debut novel, The Havoc of Choice, was a national bestseller in Kenya and the United Kingdom.

== Education ==
Koinange holds a Bachelor of Arts degree in Journalism and Literature from the United States International University (USIU) in Nairobi. She earned a Master of Arts in Creative Writing from the University of Cape Town in South Africa.

== Career ==
=== Writing ===
Koinange's debut novel, The Havoc of Choice, was published in the UK in 2019 and in Kenya in 2020. Her journalism and non-fiction writing have been published in outlets such as Chimurenga and SlipNet. In 2015, she served as a cultural correspondent for East and Southern Africa with Commonwealth Writers.

=== Book Bunk ===
In 2017, Koinange co-founded Book Bunk with Angela Wachuka. The independent non-profit organization partners with Nairobi's county government to restore and manage the city's iconic public libraries, including the historic McMillan Memorial Library.

== Awards and recognition ==
- Listed in the Business Daily Top 40 Under 40 Women
