= The Letter (2019 film) =

2019 Kenyan film

- Film poster
- Directed by: Maia Lekow; Christopher King
- Written by: Chris King; Maia Lekow; Ricardo Acosta
- Produced by: Chris King; Maia Lekow
- Cinematography: Chris King
- Edited by: Chris King; Ricardo Acosta
- Music by: Chris King; Ricardo Acosta
- Production companies: Circle and Square Productions
- Distributed by: Parallel 40 - Planeta Med
- Release date: 19 November 2019 (Amsterdam)
- Running time: 84 minutes
- Country: Kenya
- Language: Swahili

The Letter is a 2019 Kenyan documentary film directed by Maia Lekow and Chris King. It was selected as the Kenyan entry for the Best International Feature Film at the 93rd Academy Awards, but it was not nominated.

== Synopsis ==
A young man visits his grandmother's village to find out she has been accused of witchcraft.

== See also ==
- List of submissions to the 93rd Academy Awards for Best International Feature Film
- List of Kenyan submissions for the Academy Award for Best International Feature Film
