= Seeds (2025 film) =

2025 American documentary film

- Theatrical release poster
- Directed by: Brittany Shyne
- Produced by: Brittany Shyne; Sabrina Schmidt Gordon; Danielle Varga
- Cinematography: Brittany Shyne
- Edited by: Malika Zouhali-Worrall
- Music by: Robert Aiki Aubrey Lowe
- Production companies: Interior Films; Walking Productions; Black Public Media; ITVS; Vespertine Films; JustFilms/Ford Foundation; Chicken & Egg Films; Viva Maude
- Release date: January 25, 2025 (Sundance)
- Running time: 123 minutes
- Country: United States
- Language: English

Seeds is a 2025 American documentary film directed and produced by Brittany Shyne. It follows Black generational family farmers in the American South, exploring their joys, struggles, and the significance of owning their own land. Tessa Thompson serves as an executive producer under her Viva Maude. Other Seeds executive producers include Leslie Fields-Cruz, Maida Lynn, Kishori Rajan, and D.D. Wigley.

It had its world premiere at the 2025 Sundance Film Festival on January 25, 2025, where it won the U.S. Documentary Grand Jury Prize. Seeds was included on the 2025 Academy Award Shortlist.

== Premise ==
Explores the decline of Black generational family farmers in the American south, exploring their joy and struggles, and significance of owning land.

== Release ==
It had its world premiere at the 2025 Sundance Film Festival on January 25, 2025, where it won the U.S. Documentary Grand Jury Prize. It also screened at True/False Film Festival, CPH:DOX, Full Frame Documentary Film Festival, San Francisco International Film Festival,Seattle International Film Festival, Margaret Mead Film Festival, Camden International Film Festival, Hamptons International Film Festival, BFI London Film Festival, Woodstock Film Festival, Chicago International Film Festival, and AFI Fest.

== Reception ==
=== Critical reception ===
On the review aggregator website Rotten Tomatoes, 96% of 23 critics' reviews are positive. Metacritic, which uses a weighted average, assigned the film a score of 92 out of 100, based on 7 critics, indicating "universal acclaim".
