= Miki Magasiva =

Samoan-born New Zealand filmmaker

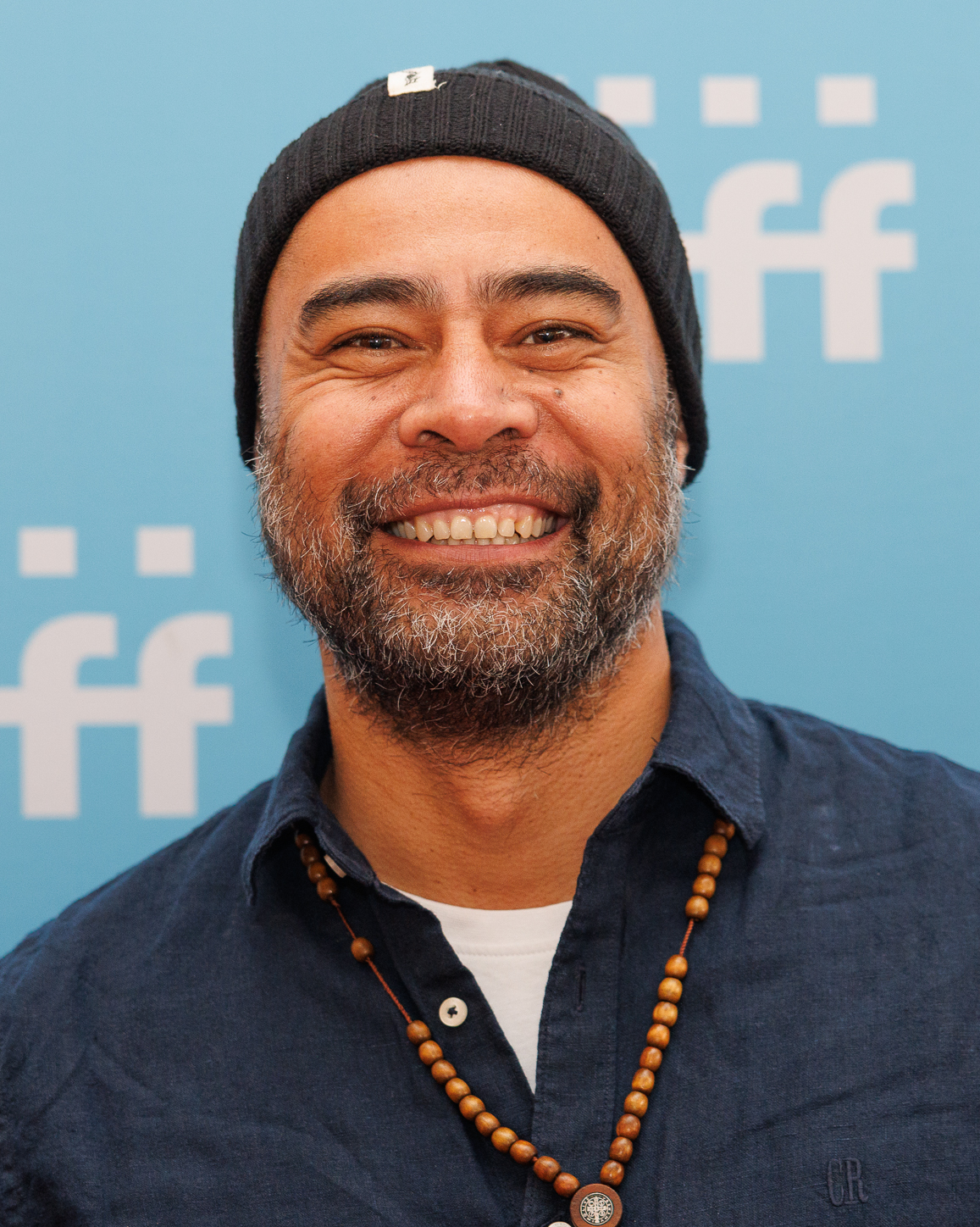
- Magasiva at the Seattle International Film Festival in 2025
- Born: Savaiʻi, Samoa
- Citizenship: New Zealand
- Occupation: Filmmaker
- Known for: Tinā
- Parents: Taufaiula Magasiva; Salafa Magasiva

Miki Magasiva is a Samoan-born filmmaker from New Zealand. In 2024, he premiered his feature debut, Tinā, at the Hawaiʻi International Film Festival and has since won several awards, including the Golden Space Needle for Best Film. It has become one of the highest grossing New Zealand films in history.

== Early life ==
Magasiva was born in Savaiʻi of the Samoan Islands to Taufaiula and Salafa Magasiva. His father was a post office worker, and his mother "worked odd jobs, doing whatever she could, from working in a record company printing labels to cleaning businesses and those sorts of things". In 1982, his family moved to Wellington, New Zealand.

== Career ==
Magasiva spent two decades "making hundreds of commercials, television, music videos, and short films". In 2005, he made a short film titled Rites of Courage, followed by Uso in 2006. He then worked on two episodes of The Panthers, a New Zealand television drama that screened at the Toronto International Film Festival. He also worked on We Are Still Here.

In the 2020s, Magasiva worked on Tinā, which he directed, wrote, and produced. He received a $25,000 grant from the New Zealand Film Commission in order to write the film's script, as well as another $1.9 million in 2022–2023 to make it. Tinā then premiered at the Hawaiʻi International Film Festival in October 2024 and was later awarded the Golden Space Needle for Best Film at the 2025 Seattle International Film Festival, as well as the Narrative Audience award at the Palm Springs International Film Festival. It was released in New Zealand on 27 February 2025, and Australia on 1 May, and has since been considered one of the most successful New Zealand films of all time.

== Personal life ==
Magasiva has four brothers: Robbie, Steven, and twins Tanu and Pua Magasiva. Pua Magasiva died in 2019.
