= U Are the Universe =

2024 film by Pavlo Ostrikov

- Ukrainian: Ти — Космос
- Directed by: Pavlo Ostrikov
- Written by: Pavlo Ostrikov
- Starring: Volodymyr Kravchuk; Leonid Popadko; Daria Plahtiy; Alexia Depicker
- Cinematography: Nikita Kuzmenko
- Edited by: Ivan Bannikov
- Music by: Mykyta Moiseiev
- Production companies: ForeFilms; Stenola Productions; Ukrainian State Film Agency
- Release date: 7 September 2024 (Toronto International Film Festival)
- Running time: 101 minutes
- Countries: Ukraine; Belgium
- Languages: Ukrainian; French

U Are the Universe (Ukrainian: Ти — Космос) is a 2024 Ukrainian-Belgian science fiction-romance film written and directed by Pavlo Ostrikov in his directorial debut. It premiered on 7 September 2024 at the Toronto International Film Festival, and was released in theaters in Ukraine on 20 November 2025.

== Plot ==
A Ukrainian astronaut, during a mission for a nuclear waste disposal company, discovers that Earth has exploded. He believes he is the last person alive until he receives a transmission from a French astronaut near Saturn, and decides to travel to meet her.

== Cast ==
- Volodymyr Kravchuk as Andriy Melnyk
- Leonid Popadko as Maxim
- Daria Plahtiy as Catherine (appearance)
  - Alexia Depicker as Catherine (voice)

== Production ==
The concept for U Are the Universe began while director Pavlo Ostrikov was a law student at the National Aviation University in Kyiv. He wrote and performed a short play, "Cosmos", in 2011, about the last person alive in space after the destruction of Earth. Switching careers to filmmaking after graduation, Ostrikov revisited the premise, writing the first draft of the film in 2015. He initially had difficulty finding funding for it, estimating it would cost US$2.5 million, but in 2017 he met producer Volodymyr Yatsenko at a Ukrainian Film Academy awards ceremony, who agreed to take on the project.

They pitched the film to the Ukrainian State Film Agency, securing further investment in 2020 and hiring actor Volodymyr Kravchuk and a French actress for the main roles. Principal photography was divided into two stages: simpler interior scenes, and more complicated exterior scenes in outer space, where the actors needed to be attached to cables. The first stage concluded in early January 2022. Before it could begin, the second stage was interrupted by the start of the Russian invasion of Ukraine in February 2022, and the French actress in the female lead role declined to travel to Kyiv due to safety concerns.

Shooting resumed in autumn 2022. The production resolved the casting problem by hiring a Ukrainian actress, Daria Plahtiy, for the character's physical appearance, and a Belgian actress, Alexia Depicker, for the character's French voice, then combining the two performances. Several members of the cast and crew, including the lead actor, the voice actor for the robot Maxim, and the producer served in the Armed Forces of Ukraine during production. The film's practical effects specialist, Alexander Suvorov, died in the war.

Principal photography was completed by December 2022, with a substantial amount of post-production work remaining, particularly in computer-generated visual effects. For the spaceship's design and effects, the production worked with Ukrainian visual effects company Magic Room. The film's soundtrack came from Ukrainian pop music from the 1970s and 1980, with the aim of developing a "Ukrainian space" sound.

== Release ==
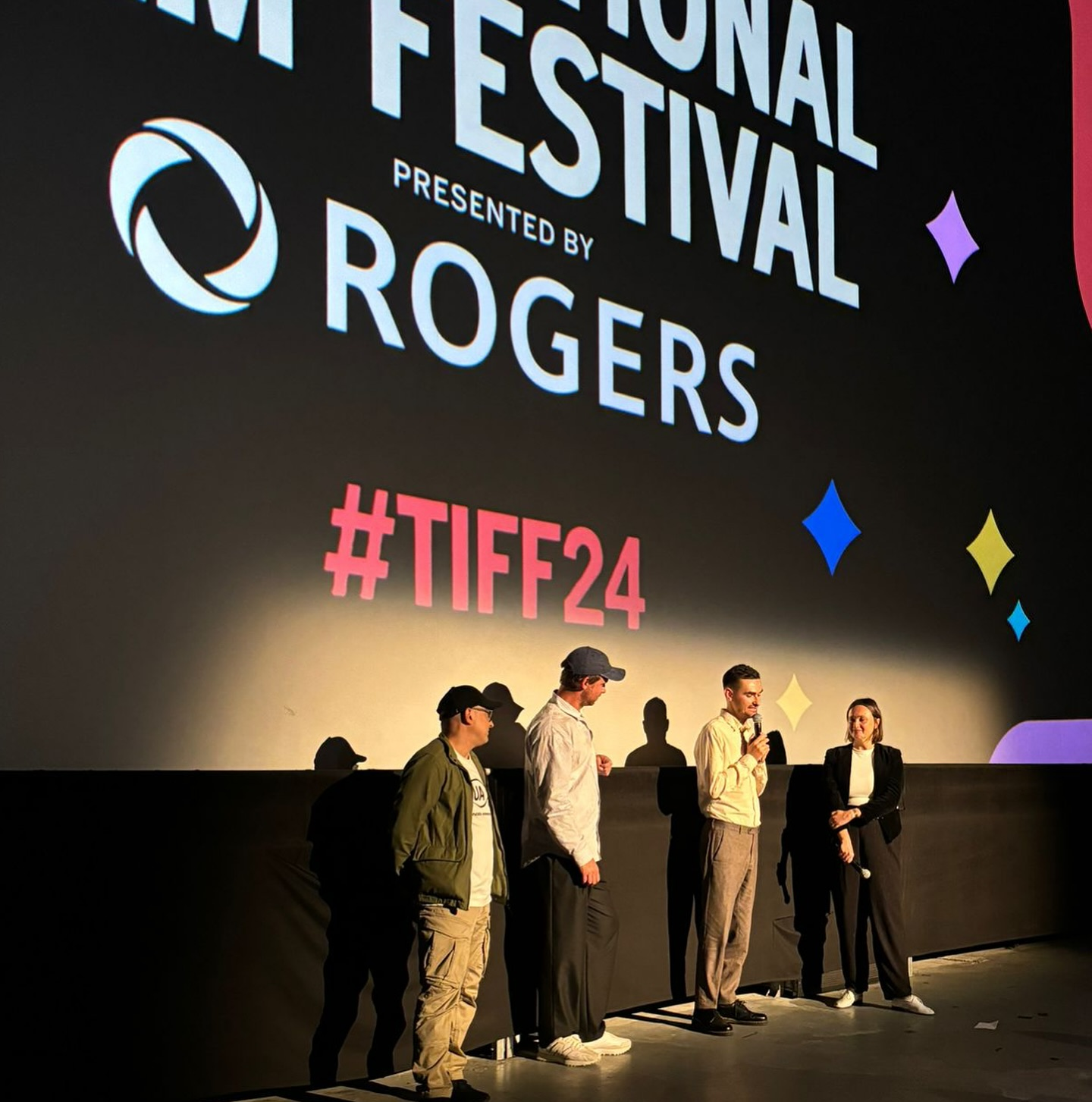
The cast and crew of U Are the Universe at its premiere at the Toronto International Film Festival

U Are the Universe had its world premiere at the 2024 Toronto International Film Festival on 7 September. It was also screened at 2024 Fantastic Fest, the 57th Sitges Film Festival, the 2024 Revelation Perth International Film Festival, and the 2025 Seattle International Film Festival.

The film was theatrically released in Ukraine on 20 November 2025.

== Reception ==
=== Critical response ===
Brian Tallerico, for RogerEbert.com, wrote, "U Are the Universe is about unexpected connections, and how we will do the impossible to take our last chance to hold onto our humanity. ... The film gets a little repetitive, but it’s also strikingly well-made. ... We believe Andriy is floating through space looking for meaning. Aren’t we all?"

Variety's Murtada Elfadl praised Kravchuk's acting, writing, "The film owes much of its strength to Kravchuk’s performance. He’s captivating and appealing in unique ways. He looks like an ordinary everyman, yet has such a magnetic presence that he turns even the smallest, goofiest gestures into entertainment. ... Kravchuk remains transfixing."

In The New Indian Express, Namrata Joshi also gave the film a positive review, writing, "In the guise of a space fantasy, U Are the Universe is all about love found in the depths of desolation ... It’s this universality of emotions that makes the film resonate and sets it apart from the typical, larger-than-life sci-fi adventures. ... It is never sentimental but steadily turns affecting with the finale packing in a deeply poignant punch."

=== Accolades ===
U Are the Universe won the Golden Octopus for Best International Film and the Silver Méliès at the 2024 Strasbourg European Fantastic Film Festival. The film also won the Asteroid Award at the 2024 Trieste Science+Fiction Festival.
