= Brittany Shyne =

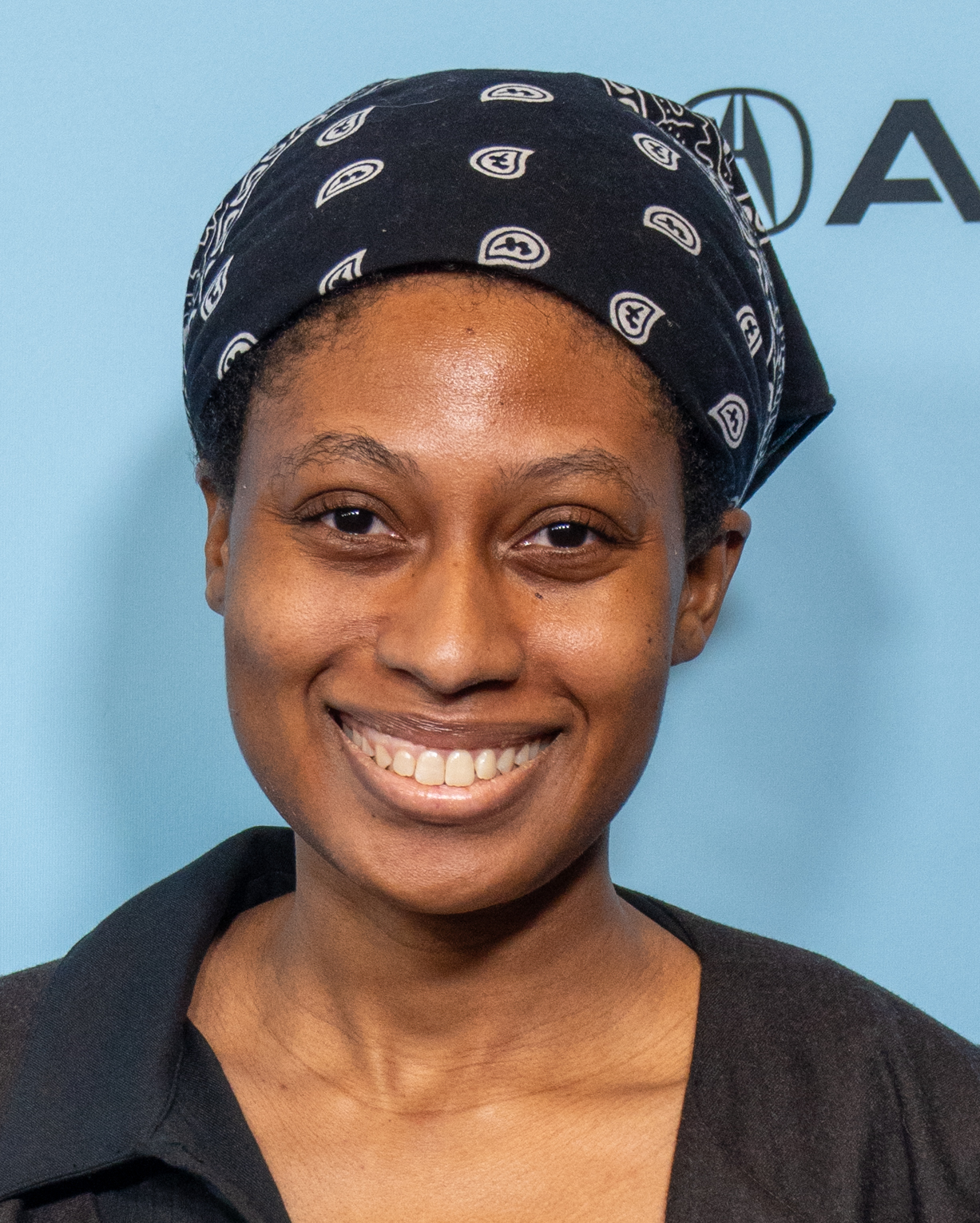
- Shyne at the 2025 Sundance Film Festival
- Education: BFA Wright State University, MFA Northwestern
- Occupations: Director, Filmmaker
- Awards: 2025 Documentary Grand Jury Prize at Sundance Film Festival, 2025 IDA’s Emerging Filmmaker Award

Brittany Shyne is an American documentary filmmaker based out of Dayton, Ohio. She is the director of the documentary Seeds.

== Early life and education ==
Shyne was raised in Dayton, Ohio. Shyne went on to earn a BFA in Motion Pictures from Wright State University and an MFA from Northwestern University.

== Career ==
Shyne previously worked on the documentary American Factory and The Debutantes.

Shyne made her feature film directorial debut with the premiere of her film Seeds at the 2025 Sundance Film Festival. Shyne worked on a plethora of roles during the filming of Seeds outside of director such as cinematographer, sound operator, and field producer over the course of 7 years of "unknownness". In 2025, Viva Maude announced they were joining Seeds as an executive producer. In 2026, PBS's Independent Lens acquired Seeds for release in the fall of 2026.

Shyne claims the work of portrait photographers such as P. H. Polk as influences on her works' aesthetics.
