= McMillan Memorial Library, Nairobi =

Public library situated in Nairobi, Kenya

McMillan Memorial Library
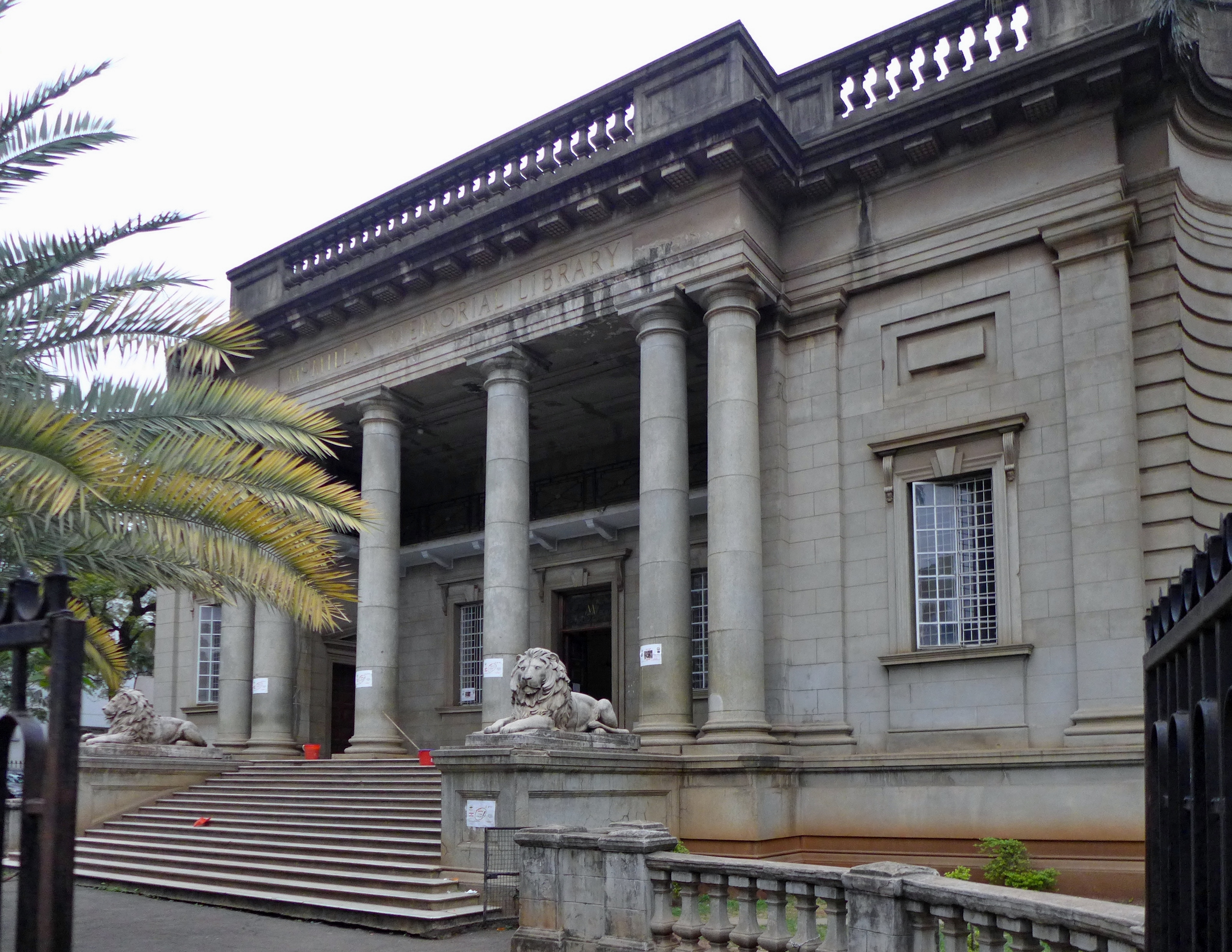
- The library in 2025
- 1°17′01″S 36°49′16″E
- Location: Nairobi, Kenya
- Type: Public
- Established: 5 June 1931

Collection
- Size: More than 400,000 publications

Other information
- Affiliation: Book Bunk
- Website: Book Bunk: McMillan Memorial Library

The McMillan Memorial Library is a public library situated in Nairobi, Kenya. It is the oldest library in Nairobi, and the second oldest in Kenya after the Seif bin Salim Library in Mombasa.

== History ==
=== Foundation ===
The library was built by the McMillan family to celebrate William Northrup McMillan, an American-born settler in the British East Africa Protectorate who died in 1925. Conceived by Lucie McMillan, his wife, construction of the building was largely financed by the Carnegie Corporation of New York, close family friends of the McMillans. The Library was officially opened on 5 June 1931 by Sir Joseph A. Byrne, Governor of Kenya.

=== McMillan Memorial Library Act ===
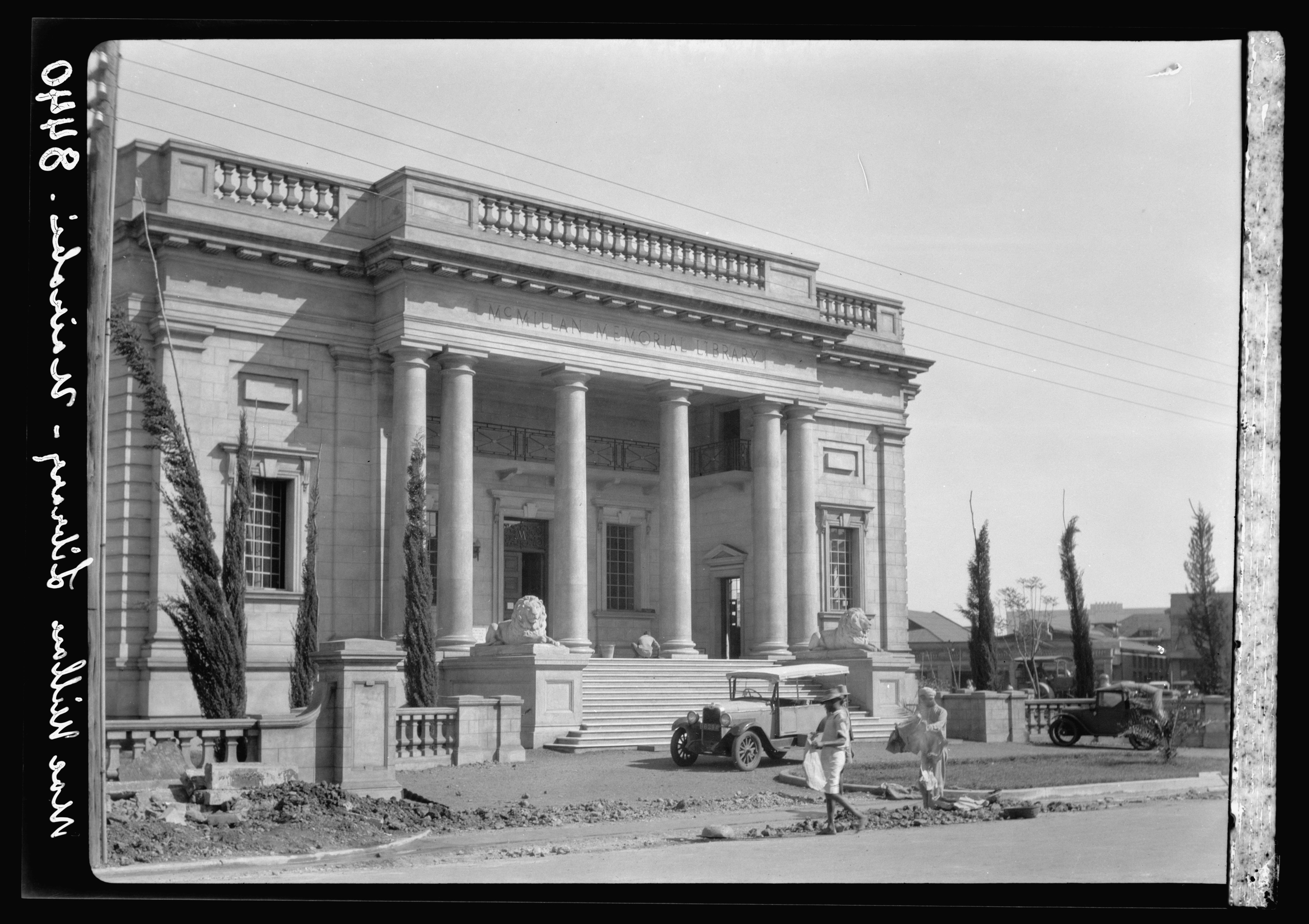
McMillan Memorial Library, 1936

At its opening, the library was racially segregated, with a "whites-only" policy. This segregation would be formally instituted into the law of the East Africa Protectorate with the McMillan Memorial Library Act Cap 217 of 1938. This act provided that the library was for the exclusive use of Europeans in addition to the usual conditions for preservation of monuments. With the act, the library became the only building in Kenya protected by a specific Act of Parliament.

=== Kenyan independence ===
The library was bequeathed to the Nairobi City Council in the late 1950s. When the city council took over, racial segregation was ended and the library was opened to the general public in 1962.

=== Restoration ===
Restoration efforts to restore the library and its branches in Kaloleni and Makadara are being spearheaded by Wanjiru Koinange and Angela Wachuka under Book Bunk Trust.

A documentary following the restoration by Koinange and Wachuka, How to Build a Library premiered at the 2025 Sundance Film Festival.

== Design ==
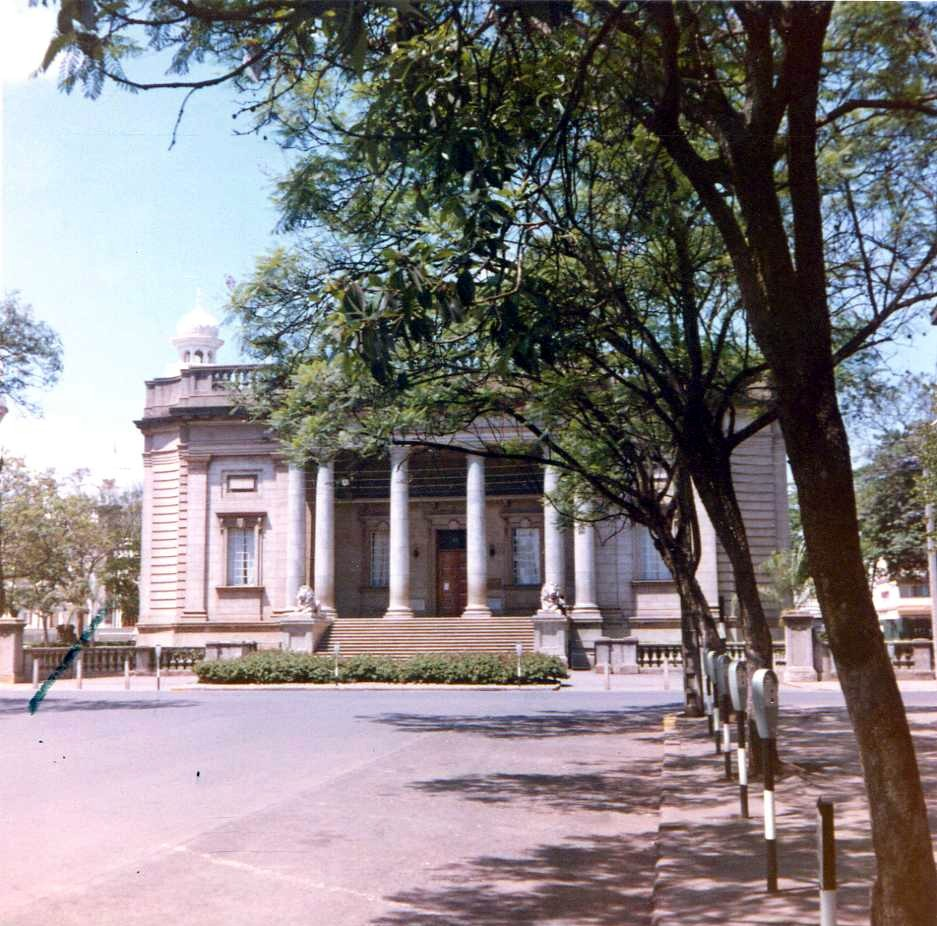
The library in 1973

The building is a neo-classical design featuring granite-clad columns along the façade and a grand white marble trapezoidal stairway leading up to the portico. Two lions statues guard either side of the entrance. The statues were donated by Sir John and Lady Harrington, cousins of McMillan. The external walls were constructed of smooth rendered stone under a flat roof and the internal walls are clad in polished timber panels. The windows are glazed in tall steel casements allowing for ample natural lighting and the doors are made of heavy hardwood panels hung in timber frames, pedimented to the lintels. The floors are finished in parquet to the main areas with terrazzo to the entrance way.

== Collections ==
The library holds more than 400,000 books including East African newspapers and periodicals dating back to 1901. It has been home to the proceedings of Parliamentary since its inception.
