= Christopher King (director) =

Australian filmmaker, editor and cinematographer

- Born: Australia
- Other name: Chris King
- Occupation: Film director, editor, cinematographer
- Spouse: Maia Lekow

Christopher King is an Australian film director, editor, cinematographer and producer, who has lived in Kenya since 2007. He is best known for his debut feature documentary, The Letter, which was Kenya’s official submission to the 93rd Academy Awards, and his sophomore film, How to Build a Library, which premiered in Sundance Film Festival. He wrote, directed and produced both documentaries alongside his wife and creative partner Maia Lekow. He also served as a cinematographer and editor on both projects.

== Life and career ==
King was born in Australia and studied at The School of Creative Arts at the University of Melbourne. In 2007, he relocated to Kenya and continued his work as a cinematographer, editor, animator, director, and producer. In 2009, he co-founded Circle & Square Productions with his wife, Maia Lekow. In the same year, he won Best Achievement in Editing at the 5th Africa Movie Academy Awards for feature film From a Whisper.

King’s directorial debut documentary feature, titled The Letter, explored the lingering impact of British colonial rule in Kenya. The film was supported by the IDFA Bertha Fund, Hot Docs Blue Ice Group, and the Sundance Institute Documentary Film Program. It had its world premiere at IDFA, followed by its German premiere at DOK.fest München. It also screened at AFI Docs, Melbourne International Film Festival, Durban International Film Festival among others.

King followed his debut with How to Build a Library, a documentary film based on two Kenyan women’s mission to restore a public library in the country’s capital, Nairobi. The idea for the documentary was born when he and Lekow were approached to create social media videos for a launch, but realized the story felt bigger. He worked on the project as a director, writer, producer, cinematographer, editor and sound recordist between 2017 to 2025. The film had its world premiere at Sundance Film Festival and competed in the World Cinema Competition.

His next film is set in a highly Islamic, patriarchal community where a woman is running for government.

== Filmography ==
Year	Film	Role	Notes
2025	How to Build a Library	Director, writer, producer, cinematographer, editor	Documentary
2019	The Letter	Director, writer, cinematographer, editor	Documentary
2011	Les Petites Barrieres	Editor	Short
2011	Beyond the Nukumatt Generation	Editor	Short
2010	Togetherness Supreme	Editor	Feature
2008	From a Whisper	Editor	Feature
