= Unclickable =

2024 Greek documentary about digital advertising fraud

- Directed by: Babis Makridis
- Written by: Guy Krief
- Produced by: Guy Krief; Amanda Livanou
- Cinematography: Thodoros Michopoulos
- Edited by: Marios Kleftakis
- Music by: Nikitas Klint
- Production companies: Neda Film; Felony Productions; Building on Bond; BuzzFeed Studios
- Distributed by: Cat&Docs
- Release date: March 10, 2024 (Thessaloniki Documentary Festival)
- Running time: 74 minutes
- Countries: Greece; Cyprus; United States
- Language: English

Unclickable is a 2024 investigative documentary film directed by Greek filmmaker Babis Makridis. The film examines digital advertising fraud through the creation of a fraudulent advertising operation targeting political campaigns during the 2020 United States presidential election. Industry estimates suggest digital ad fraud generates approximately $100 billion annually in illicit revenue. The documentary premiered at the Thessaloniki Documentary Festival on March 10, 2024.

== Synopsis ==
The documentary follows a former tech executive who assembles software developers to construct a digital advertising fraud operation. Over twelve weeks during the 2020 U.S. presidential election, the operation defrauds political advertisers, including the Trump campaign and pro-Biden organizations. The film examines the technical mechanics of ad fraud, including the use of fake websites populated with AI-generated content, botnets that simulate legitimate traffic, and the exploitation of programmatic advertising networks. The documentary profiles victims ranging from multinational corporations to small business owners, while industry experts discuss the role of platforms such as Google and Facebook in the digital advertising ecosystem.

== Production ==
The film was written and produced by Guy Krief, a former tech executive who conceived the project to expose vulnerabilities in digital advertising systems. Amanda Livanou served as co-producer. The production companies were Neda Film (Greece), Felony Productions (Cyprus), Building on Bond (Greece), and BuzzFeed Studios (United States), with financial support from the Greek Film Centre. Stelios Kammitsis served as co-producer, with Marco Veremis and Alexios Vratskides as executive producers.

The cinematographer was Thodoros Michopoulos, with editing by Marios Kleftakis. Nikitas Klint composed the original score. The runtime is 74 minutes.

Critical reviews have noted the film's distinctive stylistic approach, which relies on remote video interviews rather than in-person conversations, with thematic juxtapositions created through editing.

== Release ==
Unclickable had its world premiere on March 10, 2024, in the International Competition section of the 26th Thessaloniki Documentary Festival. In March 2024, Paris-based sales company Cat&Docs acquired international distribution rights.

The film subsequently screened at WATCH DOCS International Film Festival in Poland and Seattle International Film Festival. The film is available on the streaming platform MUBI.

== Themes ==
The documentary addresses digital advertising fraud, which the film characterizes as a significant revenue source for organized crime, with estimates suggesting the industry generates approximately $100 billion annually. The fraud operation depicted involves creating fake websites with AI-generated content, deploying botnets to simulate legitimate user traffic, and exploiting vulnerabilities in programmatic advertising networks that automate ad placement across thousands of websites.

The film examines the intersection of ad fraud and democratic processes by documenting fraud targeting political campaigns during the 2020 election. The filmmakers stated that examining the impact on democracy was a primary objective of the project.

The documentary profiles victims including corporate entities and small business owners who have lost money to ad fraud schemes.

== Reception ==
Cineuropa published a review noting that while the documentary covers familiar subject matter, it presents new details with a distinctive creative approach.

Modern Times Review characterized the film as a detailed investigation examining fraud mechanisms that cross borders and jurisdictions, contributing to debates regarding antitrust action against major technology companies.

The film received coverage in Greek media, with Kathimerini examining the documentary's exploration of how fraudulent websites with fake visitors generate real revenue through digital advertising systems. The newspaper's K Magazine also featured coverage of the film's investigation into digital fraud construction. Ta Nea reported on the film in the context of the largely unknown shadow economy of online fraud estimated at $100 billion.
