= Beef (2025 film) =

2025 musical drama film

- Film poster
- Spanish: Ruido
- Directed by: Ingride Santos
- Screenplay by: Ingride Santos; Lluís Segura
- Produced by: Kike Maíllo; Dani de la Orden; Bernat Saumell; Toni Carrizosa; Alberto Aranda; Ana Eiras
- Starring: Latifa Drame; Judith Álvarez; Asaari Bibang; Lobo Estepario
- Cinematography: Beatriz Sastre
- Edited by: Fernanda Gascón
- Production companies: Sábado Películas; Playtime Movies; Filmin; La Corte
- Distributed by: Vercine
- Release dates: 20 March 2025 (Málaga); 28 November 2025 (Spain)
- Countries: Spain; Mexico
- Language: Spanish

Beef (Spanish: Ruido, lit. 'noise') is a 2025 musical drama film directed by Ingride Santos starring Latifa Drame and Judith Álvarez alongside Asaari Bibang.

The film premiered at the 28th Málaga Film Festival on 20 March 2025 ahead of its theatrical release in Spain on 28 November 2025 under Vercine.

== Plot ==
After the death of her father, Afro-Descendant Lati plunges herself into music despite reluctance from her traditional Muslim Malian mother Aminata and, groomed by former rapper Judy, she tries to gain a foothold in the Barcelonian battle rap scene.

== Cast ==
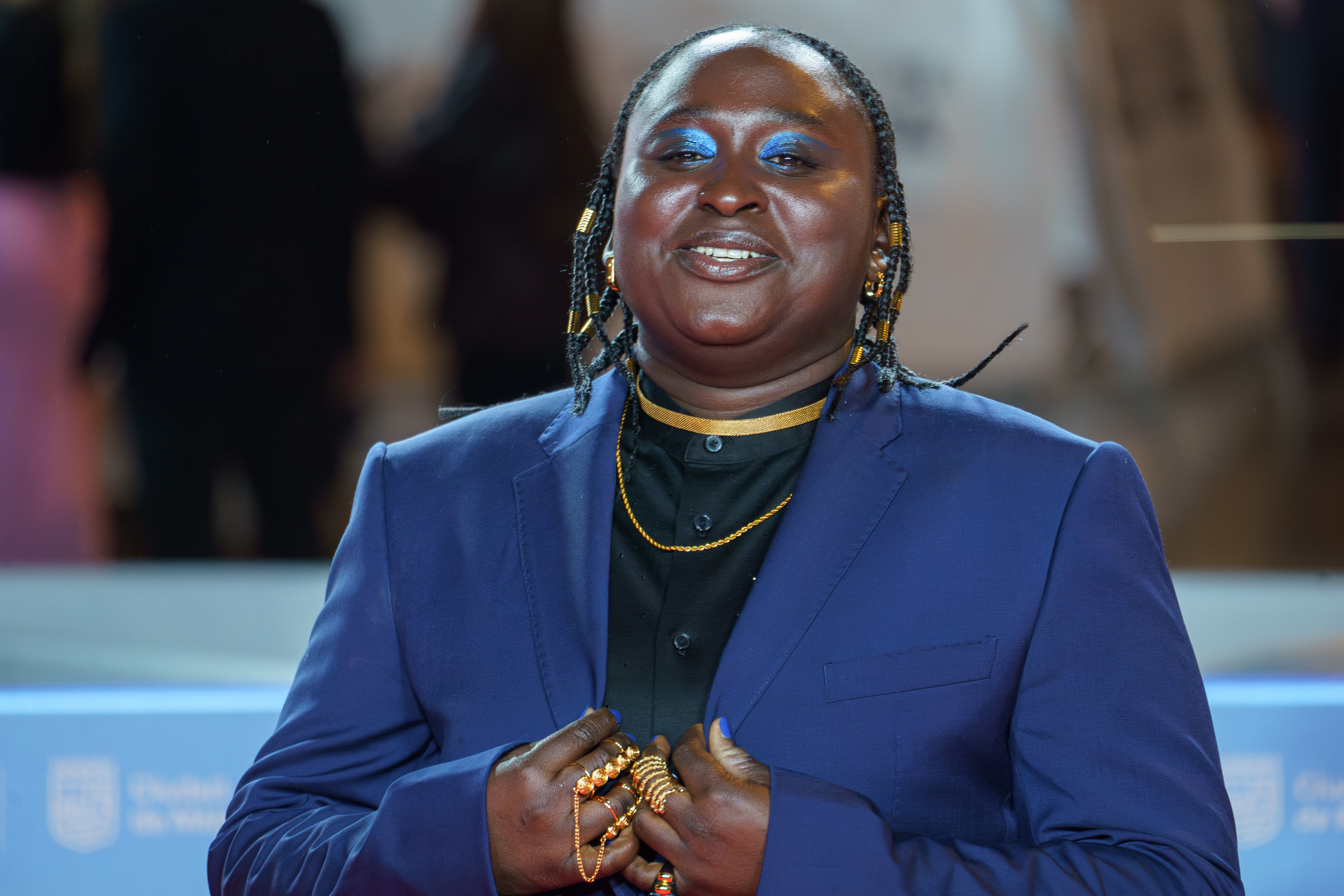
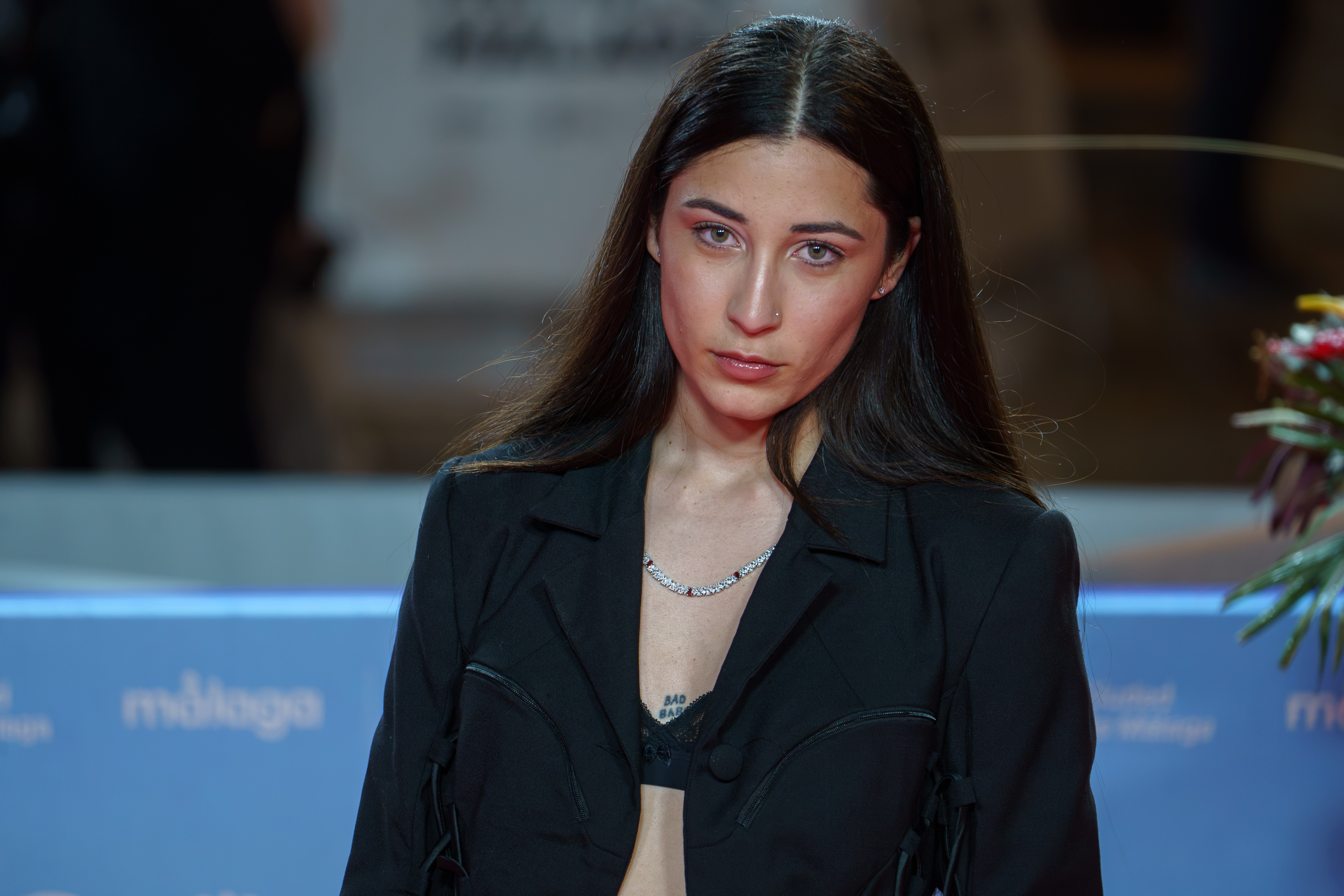
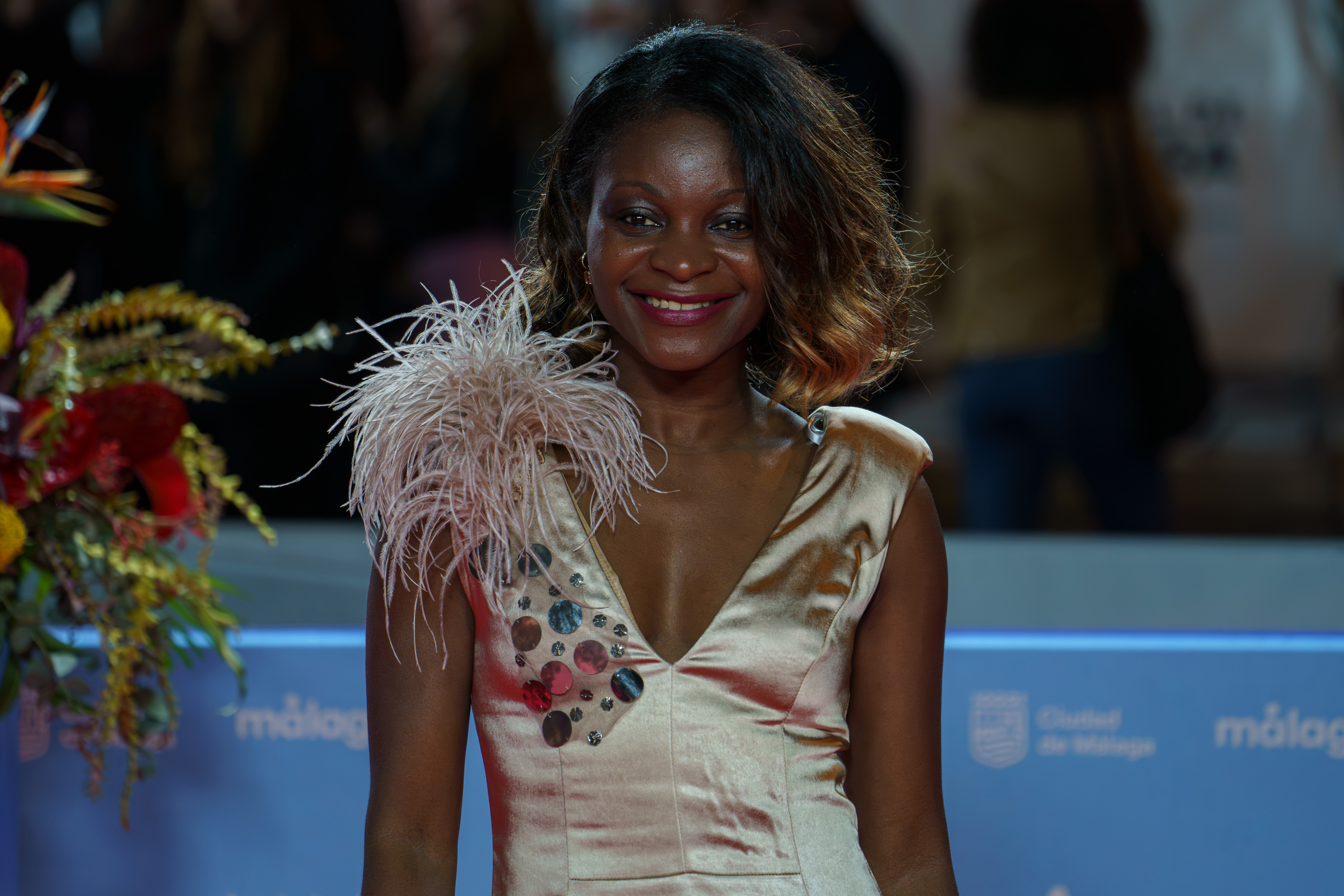
Drame, Álvarez, and Bibang attending the 2025 Málaga Film Festival
- Latifa Drame as Lati
- Judith Álvarez as Judy
- Asaari Bibang as Aminata
- Lobo Estepario

== Production ==
The film is a Filmin original produced by Sábado Películas and Playtime Movies alongside La Corte, with backing from ICAA and ICEC and collaboration from The Black View.

== Release ==
Beef was presented in the official selection of the 28th Málaga Film Festival on 20 March 2025. The film's festival run also included selections for the 51st Seattle International Film Festival in May 2025 and the 30th Toulouse Spanish Film Festival (Cinespaña) in October 2025. Distributed by Vercine, it was released theatrically in Spain on 28 November 2025. Filmin programmed a streaming debut for 26 December 2025.

== Reception ==
Víctor A. Gómez of La Opinión de Málaga assessed that the film lacks "forcefulness", otherwise reflecting on it as "Karate Kid but with rappers".

Carmen L. Lobo of La Razón rated the film 3 out of 5 stars, deeming it to be an "honest" debut film, singling out how it is "made from the heart" and the committed leading actress as the best things about the film.

Philipp Engel of Cinemanía rated the film 4 out of 5 stars, considering it "a new neorealist" and "post-Dardenian" fiction, and a "moving" ode to friendship.

== Accolades ==
Year	Award	Category	Nominee(s)	Result	Ref.
2025	30th Toulouse Spanish Film Festival	Best Director	Ingride Santos	Won	
2025	30th Toulouse Spanish Film Festival	New Filmmaker Award	Ingride Santos	Won	
2025	30th Toulouse Spanish Film Festival	Best Cinematography	Beatriz Sastre	Won	

== See also ==
- List of Spanish films of 2025
