= Kelly Sears =

American animator and filmmaker

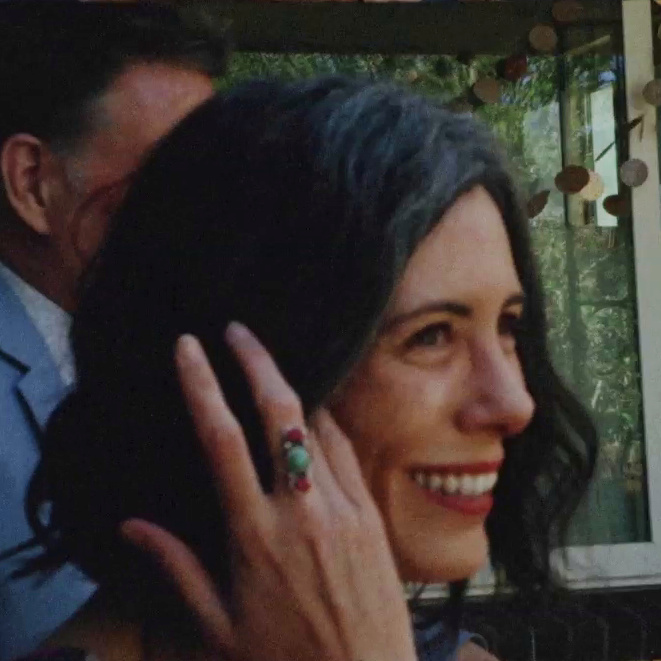
- Kelly Sears in 2020
- Born: 1978 (age 47–48); Massachusetts
- Education: Hampshire College, University of California, San Diego
- Known for: animation, film, new media art, and digital art

Kelly Sears (born 1978) is an American animator and filmmaker. In 2015 she lives in Los Angeles, California and is Assistant Professor of Film at University of Colorado Boulder. Her work consists of video, digital animation, stop-motion animation, digital imaging, and sound design.

== Early life and education ==
Sears was born in Massachusetts. She studied at Hampshire College from 1996-2000 where she attained a B.A. in Film and Video. Sears then studied from 2001-2005 at the University of California, San Diego, graduating with an M.F.A. in Film, Video, and Animation. In 2003, during her studies, Sears was part of a group exhibition named Domesticity at the Herbert Marcuse Gallery and two screenings: Video Scoring, Machine Project and Becomings, Museum of Contemporary Art.

== Career ==
After graduation, Sears worked at several universities teaching about techniques in animation, video art, and film. She was an Artist-in-Residence with The Museum of Fine Arts, Houston (September 2009 – June 2011), and was associated with the museum as a Fellow at the Core Program.

Sears was associated with Glassell School of Art as a Core Fellow. and held a and Galveston Artist Residency (September 2011 – August 2012). She received two grants, the Russell Grant and Waggerman Grant. She worked as Director of Media Studies Production at Pitzer College. She was Media Arts Instructor and an advisory board member at Aurora Picture Show.

As a visiting professor, Sears taught Introduction to Video Art at Scripps College in Claremont, California, and has also taught Experimental Animation, Found Footage Cinema, and Hybrid Media and Collaborative Art Practices classes at the University of Houston.

In 2015 she works as a new wave animator and an Assistant Professor of Film at The University of Colorado Boulder. Her work is based on politics and culture in America.

== Works ==
Sears gathers resources for images in her artwork and animations from discarded periodicals, books, encyclopedias, archival films, old magazines and advertisements and collages them together to create science fiction tales, horror movie narratives, and animated documentaries. These films are assembled using both of analogue and digital animation techniques. One of Sears earlier pieces made in 2003 is entitled Charles and Christopher.

The Body Besieged created in 2009, created from work out books, reveals creepy, unrealistic body maneuvers. Another film from the same year titled Voice on the Line comments on how technology shapes communication, fears and desires.

Various venues have shown her work such as the Sundance Film Festival, The Hammer Museum, the Los Angeles County Museum of Art, the Museum of Contemporary Art San Diego and the San Francisco Museum of Modern Art. Her work has also appeared at the San Francisco International Film Festival, The Ann Arbor Film Festival, the Festival of (In)Appropriation in San Francisco, California, Burning Bungalows: Experimental Film and Animation from L.A. She also has had various solo screenings at the following locations: Bennington College, Bennington VT, Hampshire College, Amherst, MA, River Gallery, Chelsea, MI, and the Museum of Fine Arts, Houston.
