= How to Build a Library =

How to Build a Library is a 2025 Kenyan-American documentary film, directed and produced by Maia Lekow and Christopher King. It follows Shiro Koinange and Angela Wachuka, as they restore McMillan Memorial Library, Nairobi.

It had its world premiere at the Sundance Film Festival on January 26, 2025.

== Premise ==
Kenyan publisher Angela Wachuka and writer Shiro (Wanjiku) Koinange quit their jobs to start a non-profit organisation named "Book Bunk" and, as their third project, to restore the famous, neo-classical McMillan Memorial Library, Nairobi. Along the way, they navigate local politics and confront Kenya's colonial past.

== Production ==
Angela Wachuka asked Maia Lekow and Christopher King to document as she and Shiro Koinange attempt to restore McMillan Memorial Library, Nairobi, with the footage to be posted on their website. Instead, Lekow and King decided to make a documentary following the restoration process, and using it as a vehicle to tell a larger story about Kenya. Production took place over the course of eight years, with Lekow and King self-funding. Geralyn White Dreyfous boarded the project as an executive producer, bringing on impact investors.

Roger Ross Williams served as an executive producer. The project received additional support from Catapult Film Fund, Abigail Disney/Fork Films, Chicken & Egg Films, and Hot Docs-Blue Ice Docs Fund.

== Release ==
It had its world premiere at the 2025 Sundance Film Festival on January 26, 2025. It was also screened at the True/False Film Festival on February 27, 2025. On May 9, 2025, the film will have its German premiere at the International Documentary Film Festival Munich in the section Reframing History.
