= Tinā =

- Film poster
- Directed by: Miki Magasiva
- Written by: Miki Magasiva
- Produced by: Miki Magasiva; Dan Higgins; Mario Gaoa
- Starring: Anapela Polataivao; Antonia Robinson; Beulah Koale; Nicole Whippy; Dalip Sondhi; Jamie Irvine; Alison Bruce
- Cinematography: Andrew McGeorge
- Edited by: Luke Haigh
- Music by: Sebastien Pan; Tuilagi Dr. Igelese Ete
- Production companies: The Brown Factory; New Zealand Film Commission
- Distributed by: Madman Entertainment
- Release date: 8 October 2024
- Running time: 124 minutes
- Country: New Zealand
- Languages: English; Samoan
- Budget: NZ$4,300,000
- Box office: $6 million

Tinā is a 2024 New Zealand drama film written and directed by Miki Magasiva. It stars Anapela Polataivao as a dissatisfied substitute teacher, recently bereaved after the 2011 Christchurch earthquake killed her daughter. She begins to work at an elite private school and starts a student choir. The film premiered at the Hawaii International Film Festival on 8 October 2024, and was released in cinemas on 27 February 2025. This film marked Magasiva's directorial debut.

== Plot ==
Samoan New Zealander Mareta Percival works as a teacher at a primary school in the low-income Christchurch suburb of Aranui. On the day of the 2011 Christchurch earthquake, Mareta's daughter auditions at the CTV Building and is killed during the earthquake. A grief-stricken Mareta loses her sense of purpose in life while struggling to cling to her Roman Catholic faith.

In 2014, in order to maintain her unemployment benefits, her nephew and social worker Sio convinces Mareta to apply for a job as a substitute teacher at St Francis School, a largely Pākehā and rigidly conservative private school. Despite reservations from the school board, the retiring headmaster Alan Hubbard convinces them to hire Mareta as a substitute teacher. After walking in on a student, Sophie, being confronted by deputy principal Peter Wadsworth to specialise in an instrument, Mareta covers for her by pretending they had discussed vocal scholarships. Since St Francis lacks a choir, Mareta convinces Alan to allow her to start one with herself as its choirmaster, much to the disdain of Peter who tries to undermine Mareta and the choir. Mareta also enlists the help of St Francis alumni and accomplished chorister Helen.

The choir attracts several students other than Sophie such as Anthony Bull, Mei-Ling and Luke. Despite their privileged upbringing, these students—particularly Sophie—struggle with personal traumas and insecurities. As a choir, the students learn to work as a team. Seeing potential in Sophie, Mareta trains her as lead chorister. With the encouragement of her Catholic priest Father McAfee, the St Francis choir conducts their first performance at Mareta's Samoan church. After the performance, Mareta's former teaching colleague, Rona, confronts Mareta as she views St Francis kids as privileged and elite. This leads to Mareta passing out and being brought to the hospital, revealing her cancer diagnosis which she had hidden.

Mareta introduces her students to the upcoming national Big Sing competition hoping to get them to compete in it, which her students agree to. However, due to a troubled home life, Sophie leaves the choir after refusing to don a lavalava due to a disfiguring arm injury, forcing Mei-Ling to take a leadership role. Tensions flare up after Anthony and Mei-Ling are embroiled in a fight with St Francis' elite rugby team, which Anthony is a part of, leading to Anthony also leaving the choir.

Despite these obstacles and her own terminal cancer condition, Mareta is determined to lead the choir to perform at the Big Sing competition. However, Peter uses the fight between the choir and rugby team as reason and convinces the school board to pressure Mareta into ending the choir programme. Due to the students' support, defying Peter, the St Francis choir participates in the semi-final and qualifies for the final of the Big Sing. However, as a result, Mareta's teaching contract is terminated.

Mareta is hospitalised due to her worsening cancer. However, the choristers are still determined to participate in the final round of the Big Sing competition. Sophie and Anthony return to the St Francis choir. In order to compensate for Mareta's absence, Sophie enlists the help of her mother and board member Caroline and Rona's support. On the night of the competition, Mareta succumbs to her cancer, but, after doubts and anxiety leading her to almost leaving, Sophie leads the St Francis choir, wearing a lavalava, to perform a traditional Samoan song for the final round of the Big Sing.

== Cast ==
- Anapela Polataivao as Mareta
- Antonia Robinson as Sophie
- Beulah Koale as Sio
- Nicole Whippy as Rona
- Dalip Sondhi as Alan Hubbard
- Jamie Irvine as Peter Wadsworth
- Alison Bruce as Caroline
- Zac O'Meagher as Anthony Bull
- Talia Pua as Mei-ling
- Tania Nolan as Helen
- Matthew Chamberlain as Father McAfee
- Caleb Nazzer as Luke

== Production ==
=== Development ===
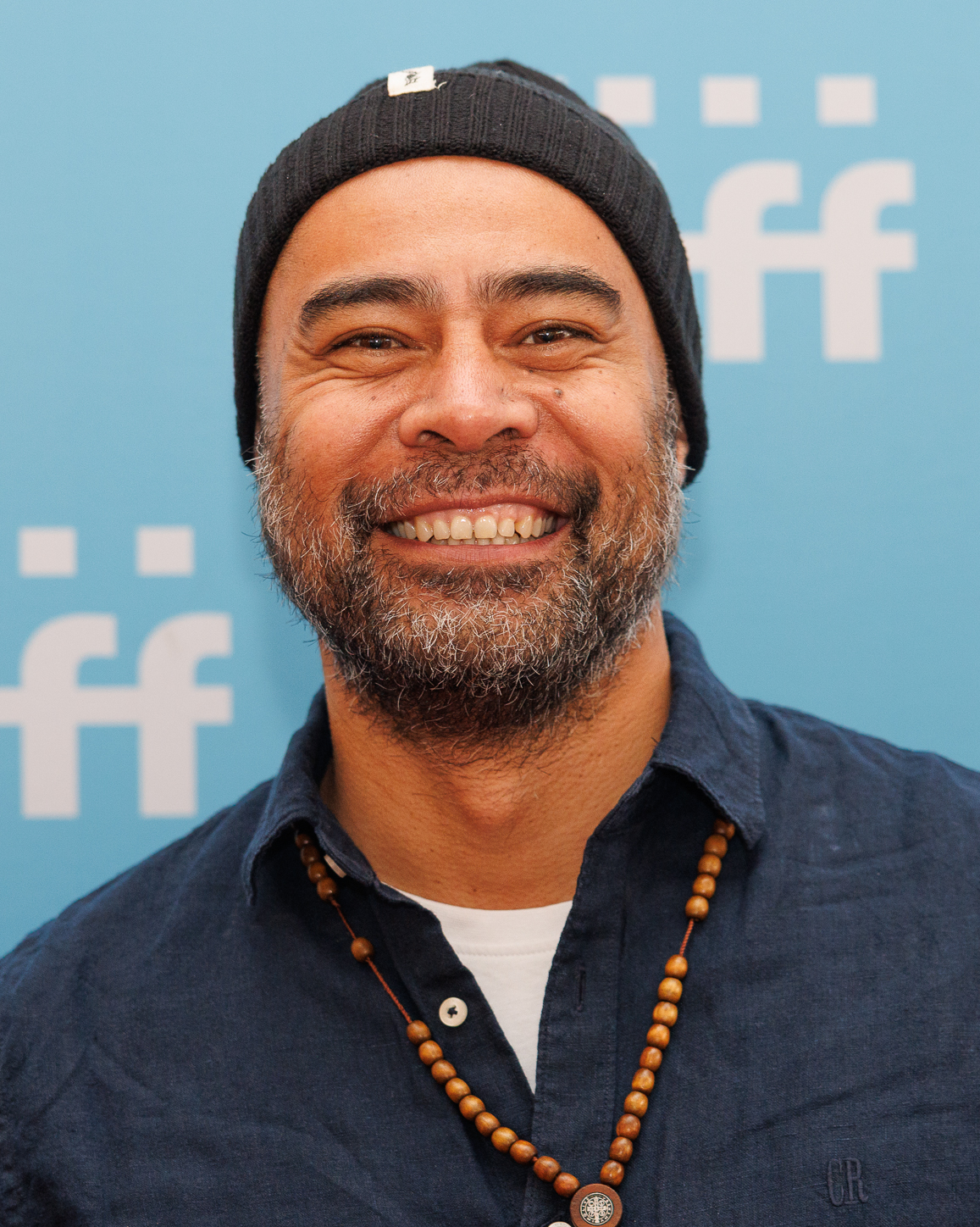
Miki Magasiva at Seattle International Film Festival 2025

Tinā was directed by Miki Magasiva, who also wrote the screenplay and served as a co-producer. This film marks his directorial debut. Zuzanna Biolik served as script supervisor and Annalise Holloway as script coordinator.

=== Filming ===
The film was a joint production between The Brown Factory and Tu Fa'atasi Films. It received funding from the New Zealand Film Commission, the New Zealand Screen Production Grant and NZ On Air. The film was shot on location between September and October 2023. Despite being set in Christchurch, it was also filmed in Auckland.

Other producers included Dan Higgins and Mario Gaoa, while Jamie Hilton and Victoria Dabbs served as co-producers. Gene Keelan served as line producer. Mike Dwyer served as casting director.

Andrew McGeorge served as cinematographer while Luke Haigh served as editor and Ana Miskell as production designer. Teuila Field served as first assistant director. Sacha Young served as costume designer while Vee Gulliver served as hair and makeup designer. Clare Burlington served as colourist.

=== Film score ===
The choir music was written and arranged by Tuilagi Dr. Igelese Ete, who previously worked on the Lord of the Rings trilogy and Moana. Sebastien Pan served as composer while Anime Ramer served as music supervisor. David Squire was choir director.

== Release ==
Tinā premiered at the Hawaii International Film Festival on 8 October 2024, and in New Zealand at the Civic Theatre in Auckland on 11 February 2025.

The film received its general release on 27 February 2025. According to the New Zealand Film Commission, Tinā earned over NZ$1 million during its opening weekend. The film had the third biggest opening for a New Zealand movie, coming behind Hunt for the Wilderpeople and Sione's 2: Unfinished Business. Tinā was released in 128 cinemas across New Zealand along with Papua New Guinea, the Cook Islands, Fiji and Samoa.

In August 2025 it was reported that Tinā had overtaken Whale Rider at the box office to become New Zealand's fifth most successful film.

== Reception ==
On review aggregator website Rotten Tomatoes, the film holds a 95% approval rating based on 20 critic reviews.

Karl Puschmann of The New Zealand Herald gave Tinā a positive review, praising the performances of Anapela Polataivao as the protagonist Mareta and Antonia Robinson as troubled student Sophie. Puschmann compared the film to similar underdog genre films such as Taika Waititi's Next Goal Wins, Damon Fepulea'i's Red, White & Brass, Pitch Perfect and School of Rock. Puschmann also praised director-writer Miki Magasiva for balancing serious issues such as death, grief, suicide and terminal illness with moments of comic relief. He also liked Magasiva for focusing the film's story on the cultural clash between Mareta's Samoan background and the school's "snooty adults." Puschmann also praised the film's story progression.

Simon Morris of Radio New Zealand gave Tinā a positive review, writing that the film was "full of comedy, tragedy, conflict, inspiration and it has to be said, some generous dollops of schmaltz." He also praised director-writer Magasiva and Polataivao's portrayal of Mareta. Morris also liked the plot of Mareta bonding with uptight, rich Pākehā children particularly teenager Sophie through music.

The Spinoff editor Madeleine Chapman praised the performances of Polataivao, Robinson, and Beulah Koale. While Chapman said that Robinson was "given plenty to work with" through her character Sophie, she wrote that the writers could have "afforded to give her character more edge without losing her humanity." Chapman also described the film as a critique of elite private schools in New Zealand, describing the principal in waiting and the board chair as "villainous caricatures." She wrote that Tinā was marketed as a "deeply Pacific film where race and culture is at the heart of its story" but described its execution as a "classic tearjerker aimed at a predominantly Palagi (European New Zealanders) audience."
