= Maia Lekow =

Kenyan filmmaker and musician

- Born: Kenya
- Other name: Maia von Lekow
- Occupations: Musician; Filmmaker; Composer
- Spouse: Christopher King

Maia Lekow is a Kenyan film director, producer, composer and musician. She is best known for her debut feature documentary, The Letter, which was Kenya's official submission to the 93rd Academy Awards, and her second feature film, How to Build a Library, which premiered in the 2025 Sundance Film Festival.

She was named a goodwill ambassador for UNHCR on World Refugee Day in 2013.

== Early life and background ==
Lekrow was born and raised in Kiambu. She is the daughter of Sal Davis, a Kenyan musician, and Maggie von Lekow, who is of German and Italian descent. Raised primarily by her mother, her multicultural upbringing and early exposure to diverse cultures and music influenced her later work. After studying and performing music in Australia, Lekow returned to Kenya in 2007, where she collaborated with local musicians.

== Career ==
=== Filmmaking ===
Lekow’s debut documentary feature, titled The Letter, had its world premiere at IDFA, and was Kenya’s official selection to the 93rd Academy awards. The film was supported by the IDFA Bertha Fund, Hot Docs Blue Ice Group, and the Sundance Institute Documentary Film Program.

Lekow followed her debut with How to Build a Library, a documentary film based on two Kenyan women's mission to restore a public library in the country's capital, Nairobi. The documentary, which premiered at Sundance Film Festival and competed in the World Cinema Competition, explores themes around colonialism, youth, gender, cultural heritage and reclaiming forgotten spaces. She worked on the project as a director, producer, sound recordist and co-composer between 2017 to 2025.

Her next film is set in a highly Islamic, patriarchal community where a woman is running for government.

=== Music ===
Lekow's early recordings, under the name Maia von Lekow, include a 2008 self-titled EP featuring "Oyster," which appeared on Warner Poland's Ladies' Jazz Album Vol. 6, and "Uko Wapi," which earned her two African Movie Academy Awards for Best Soundtrack.

In 2012, she released her official debut album, "Drift," a twelve-track collection of original songs that explored themes of identity, belonging, and cultural dislocation. The album title reflected both her personal and musical journey, as well as her experiences living in various countries.

In 2018, she released her sophomore album "Maia & The Big Sky" on both digital and vinyl records, marking the first Kenyan vinyl record in 33 years.

== Personal life ==
Lekow is married to director Christopher King. They live together in Kenya.

== Filmography ==
Year	Film	Role	Notes
2025	How to Build a Library	Director, writer, producer, composer, sound recordist	Documentary
2019	The Letter	Director, writer, producer, composer	Documentary
