= Viva Maude =

American production company

- Type: Private
- Industry: Entertainment
- Founder: Tessa Thompson
- Key people: Kishori Rajan
- Products: Motion pictures Television programs

Viva Maude is an American production company founded by actress Tessa Thompson. Kishori Rajan joined Thompson as her producing partner in 2021. Viva Maude produced the film Hedda and the series His & Hers along with the feature film IS GOD IS. As of May 2026, Viva Maude has over 20 film and television projects in development.

== History ==
The launch of Viva Maude, founded by Tessa Thompson, was announced in January 2021 with a two-year first-look deal with HBO and HBO Max. Kishori Rajan is the company's senior vice president of development and production. The company is eponymously named after Harold and Maude, in particular Maude who was played by actress Ruth Gordon. The film that turned a profit in 1983, several years after its initial release and the year Thompson was born. She stated that the aim of Viva Maude "is to expand the aperture, to change who gets star treatment, to inspire new voices to feel like they have a home that’s safe where they can cultivate stories that they want to tell."

The television adaptations of Who Fears Death and The Secret Lives of Church Ladies were announced in January 2021. Thompson is slated to executive produce both projects. An HBO adaptation of Luster by Raven Leilani was announced in October 2021 with Gaumont to co-produce.

Viva Maude signed a first-look film deal with Amazon MGM Studios in January 2024.

Viva Maude signed with CAA in July 2025. Hedda, produced with Plan B and starring Thompson, was released in September 2025. In January 2026, Thompson co-starred in and produced the Netflix limited series His and Hers under Viva Maude, an adaptation of the novel by Alice Feeney. In March 2026, it was announced that Viva Maude will adapt Katie Kitamura's A Separation, with Thompson set to produce and star. Linden Productions, Faliro House, and Anonymous Content will co-produce. That month the development of the A24 series Next Door, created by Sam Boyd, was announced with Viva Maude as a producing partner, and Thompson as executive producer and star.
