= James Sweeney (filmmaker) =

American filmmaker and actor (born 1990)

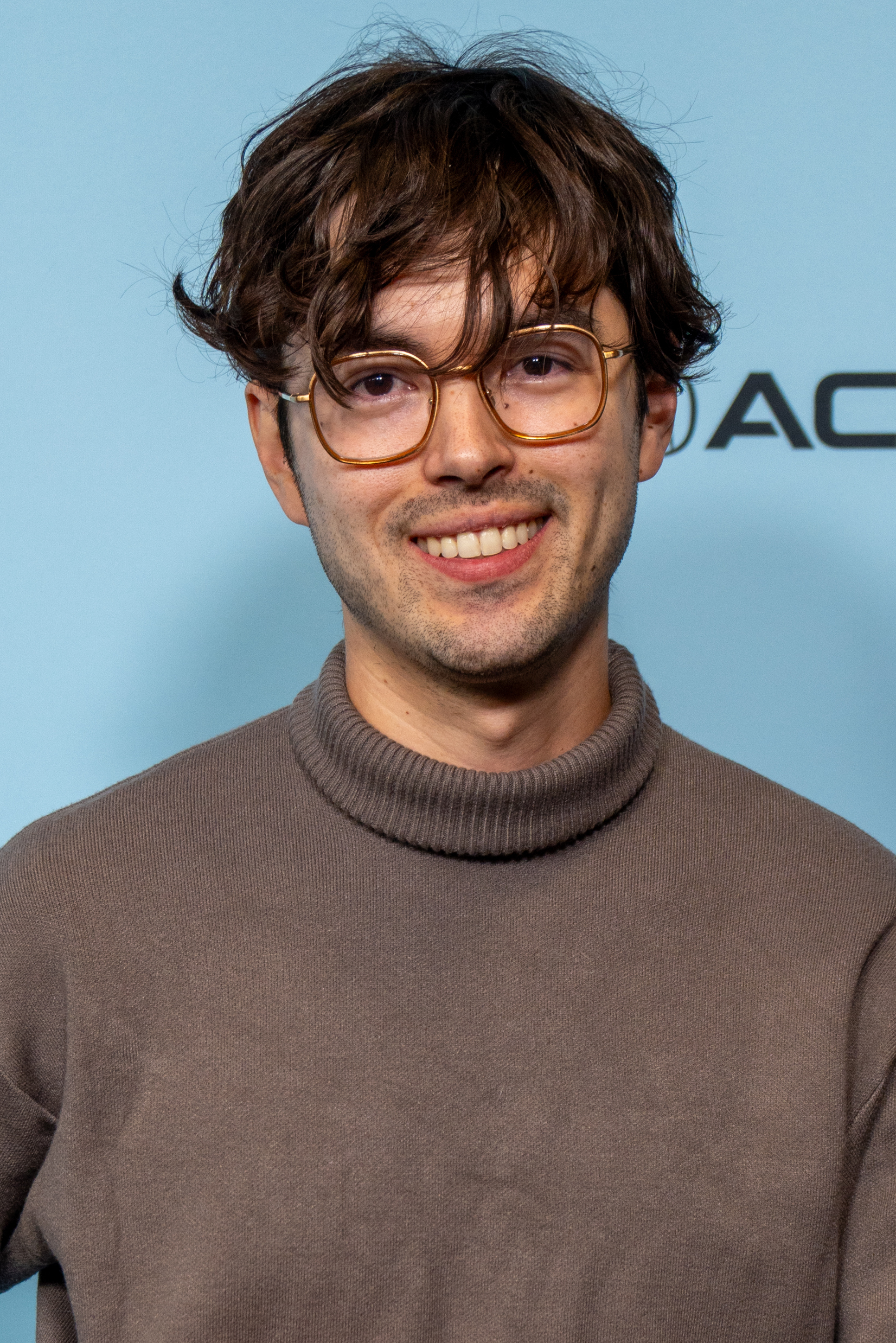
- Sweeney in 2025
- Born: 1990 (age 35–36); Sacramento, California, U.S.
- Education: Chapman University
- Occupations: Director; screenwriter; producer; actor
- Years active: 2019–present

James Sweeney (born 1990) is an American filmmaker and actor. He has written, produced, directed and starred in the comedy-dramas Straight Up (2019) and Twinless (2025).

== Life and career ==
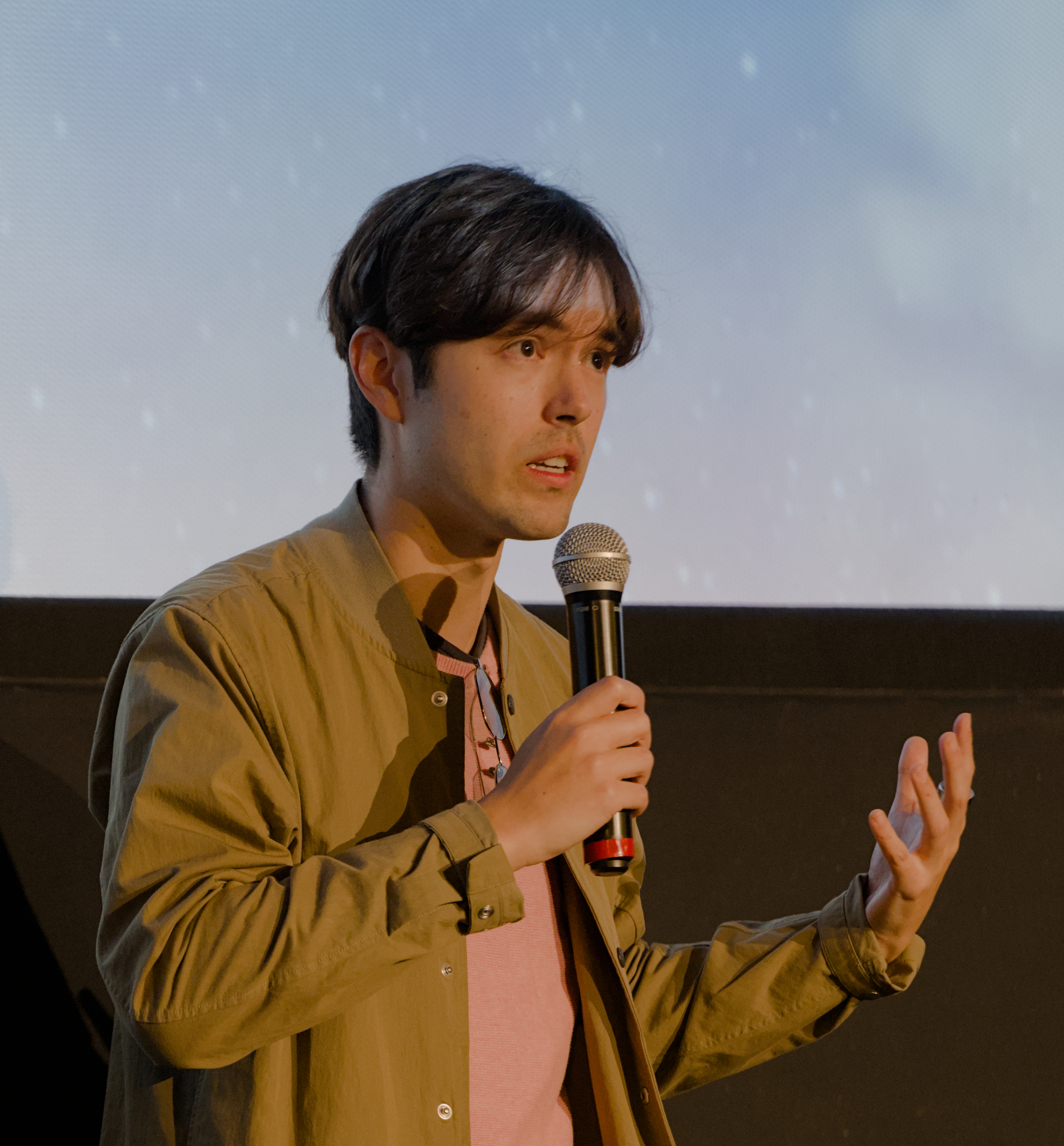
Sweeney speaking at the 2025 Seattle International Film Festival

Sweeney grew up in Alaska. He is gay and Korean American. His first break in the entertainment industry was when he was hired as a production assistant on the reality show Sarah Palin's Alaska.

In 2019, Sweeney directed, wrote, and starred in Straight Up, which had its world premiere at Outfest. The film was released in February 2020 by Strand Releasing. Prior to, Sweeney made a proof of concept short film based upon the script Normal Doors for 20th Digital Studio. Sweeney earned a nomination for Independent Spirit Award for Best First Screenplay.

Sweeney's film Twinless, which he directed and wrote, premiered at the 2025 Sundance Film Festival. He also starred in the film. Reviewing the film for Variety, Peter Debruge wrote, "On just his second film, the gifted young helmer [Sweeney] demonstrates a sophisticated sense of framing, pace and exquisitely uncomfortable dramatic tension". The film won the Audience Award Dramatic at Sundance.

== Filmography ==
| Year | Title | Credited as | | | | Role | Notes |
| Year | Title | Director | Writer | Producer | Actor | Role | Notes |
|---|---|---|---|---|---|---|---|
| 2019 | Straight Up | Yes | Yes | Yes | Yes | Todd | |
| 2025 | Twinless | Yes | Yes | Yes | Yes | Dennis | |

== Awards ==
| Award | Year | Category | Work | Result | Ref. |
|---|---|---|---|---|---|
| Astra Film Awards | 2026 | Best Indie Feature | Twinless | Won | |
| Independent Spirit Awards | 2026 | Best Feature | Twinless | Nominated | |
| Independent Spirit Awards | 2026 | Best Screenplay | Twinless | Nominated | |
| New York Film Critics Online | 2025 | Best Screenplay | Twinless | Nominated | |
| Palm Springs International Film Festival | 2025 | Directors to Watch | Twinless | Won | |
| San Francisco Bay Area Critics Circle Awards | 2025 | Special Citation for Independent Cinema | Twinless | Won | |
| Seattle International Film Festival | 2025 | Best Director | Twinless | Won | |
| Seattle International Film Festival | 2025 | Best Film | Twinless | Runner-up | |
| Sundance Film Festival | 2025 | Audience Award – U.S. Dramatic | Twinless | Won | |
| Sundance Film Festival | 2025 | Grand Jury Prize – U.S. Dramatic | Twinless | Nominated | |
