= Twinless =

2025 film by James Sweeney

- Theatrical release poster
- Directed by: James Sweeney
- Written by: James Sweeney
- Produced by: David Permut; James Sweeney
- Starring: Dylan O'Brien; James Sweeney
- Cinematography: Greg Cotten
- Edited by: Nik Boyanov
- Music by: Jung Jae-il
- Production companies: Republic Pictures; Permut Presentations
- Distributed by: Lionsgate; Roadside Attractions (United States); Sony Pictures Releasing International (international)
- Release dates: January 23, 2025 (Sundance); September 5, 2025 (United States)
- Running time: 100 minutes
- Country: United States
- Language: English
- Box office: $1.3 million

Twinless is a 2025 American psychological black comedy film produced, written and directed by James Sweeney. The film stars Dylan O'Brien, Sweeney, Aisling Franciosi, Chris Perfetti, François Arnaud, Tasha Smith, and Lauren Graham.

Twinless had its world premiere at the 2025 Sundance Film Festival on January 23, 2025, in the U.S. Dramatic Competition, where it won the Audience Award. It was released in the United States by Lionsgate Films and Roadside Attractions on September 5, 2025.

== Plot ==
After the death of his identical twin Rocky, Roman grieves deeply and joins a support group for twinless twins in Portland, Oregon. He becomes acquainted with fellow attendee Dennis, a young gay man who also says he lost his twin. The two become fast friends, with Roman leaning on Dennis for support.

The film then shifts to Dennis's perspective and flashes back to events before Rocky's death. Dennis had met Rocky at a diner, and the two hit it off and had sex. Over the next few days, Rocky ignores Dennis's attempts to communicate, leading Dennis to visit Rocky's apartment in an attempt to speak with him. Unobserved, he sees Rocky with another man and follows them in his car. He eventually approaches them on the street and confronts Rocky for rejecting him. As Rocky begins to reply, he steps into the street and is fatally struck by a car.

We then see that after learning of Rocky's death, Dennis attended his funeral, where he saw Roman. He subsequently followed Roman to the twin-loss support group where we learn that he invented a deceased twin of his own in order to get close to him. Roman is also unaware that Dennis knew Rocky or had played a role in the circumstances surrounding his death,

Dennis introduces Roman to his colleague Marcie; the two become a couple, leading Dennis to become jealous. Eventually, Marcie begins to notice inconsistencies in Dennis's claims about his family life. When she uncovers the truth, she insists that Dennis disclose his lies to Roman.

While sharing a hotel room with Roman, a drunk Dennis offers him a foot massage, which Roman accepts. Overcome with transferred lust for Rocky, Dennis begins sucking Roman's toes. When Roman declines his advances, Dennis confesses his deception. An angry Roman punches Dennis repeatedly and leaves. Roman and Dennis become socially isolated after falling out, while Roman and Marcie continue their relationship.

Some time later, Dennis and Roman meet at a diner, where they discuss Rocky and their friendship. At the end of the meeting the two share a funny moment of synchronicity.

== Cast ==
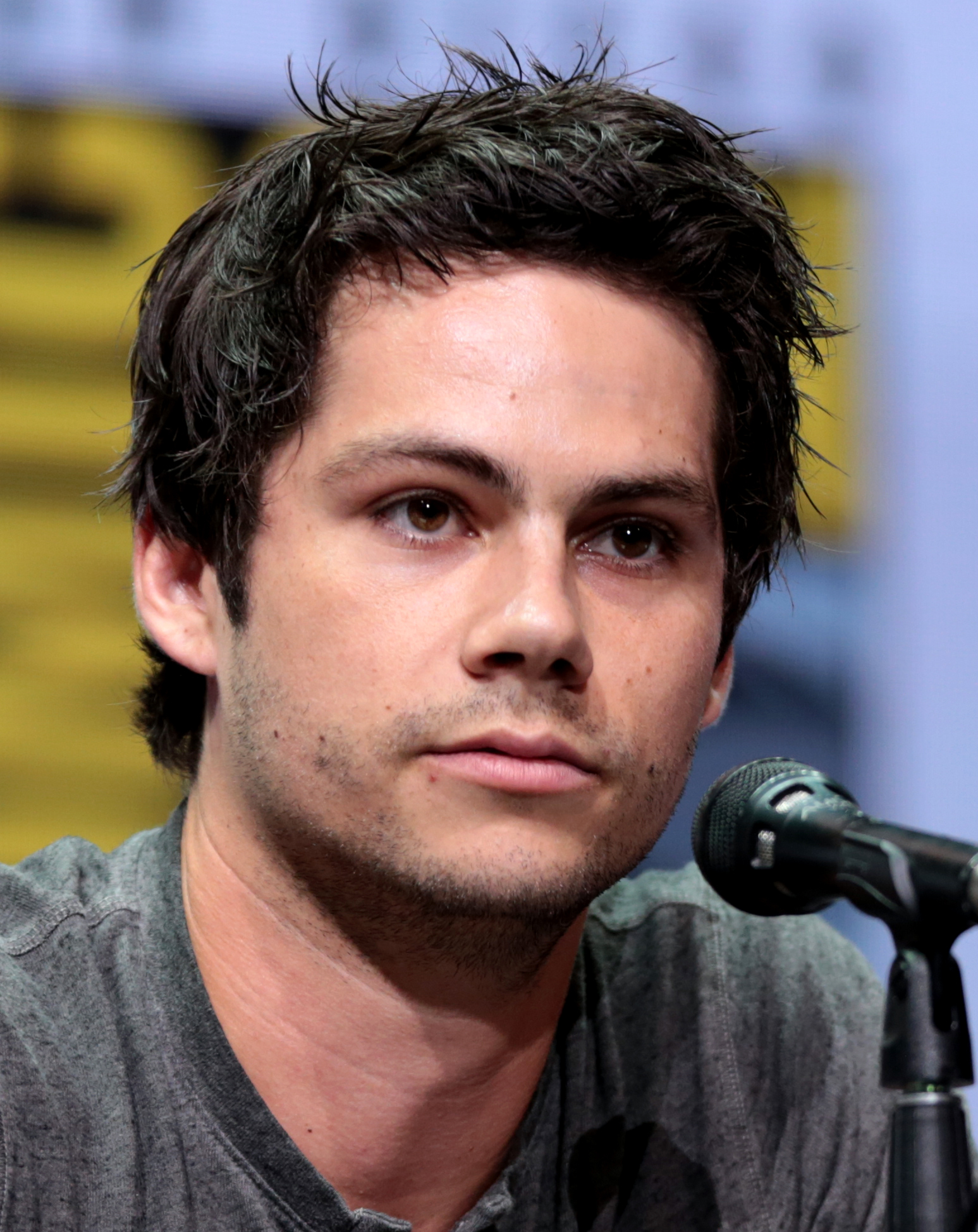
The film stars Dylan O'Brien in a dual role.

- Dylan O'Brien as Roman / Rocky
- James Sweeney as Dennis
- Aisling Franciosi as Marcie
- Chris Perfetti as George
- François Arnaud as Sammy
- Tasha Smith as Charlotte
- Lauren Graham as Lisa, Rocky and Roman's mother
- Susan Park as Sage
- Cree as Bianca
- Katie Findlay as Lori

== Production ==
In February 2024, it was announced Dylan O'Brien had joined the cast of the film, with James Sweeney set to direct and co-star from a screenplay he wrote, David Permut set to produce and Republic Pictures set to distribute. In May 2024, Aisling Franciosi and Lauren Graham joined the cast of the film. In August 2024, Tasha Smith, Chris Perfetti, François Arnaud, Susan Park and Cree Cicchino joined the cast of the film.

Principal photography took place in Portland, Oregon.

== Release ==
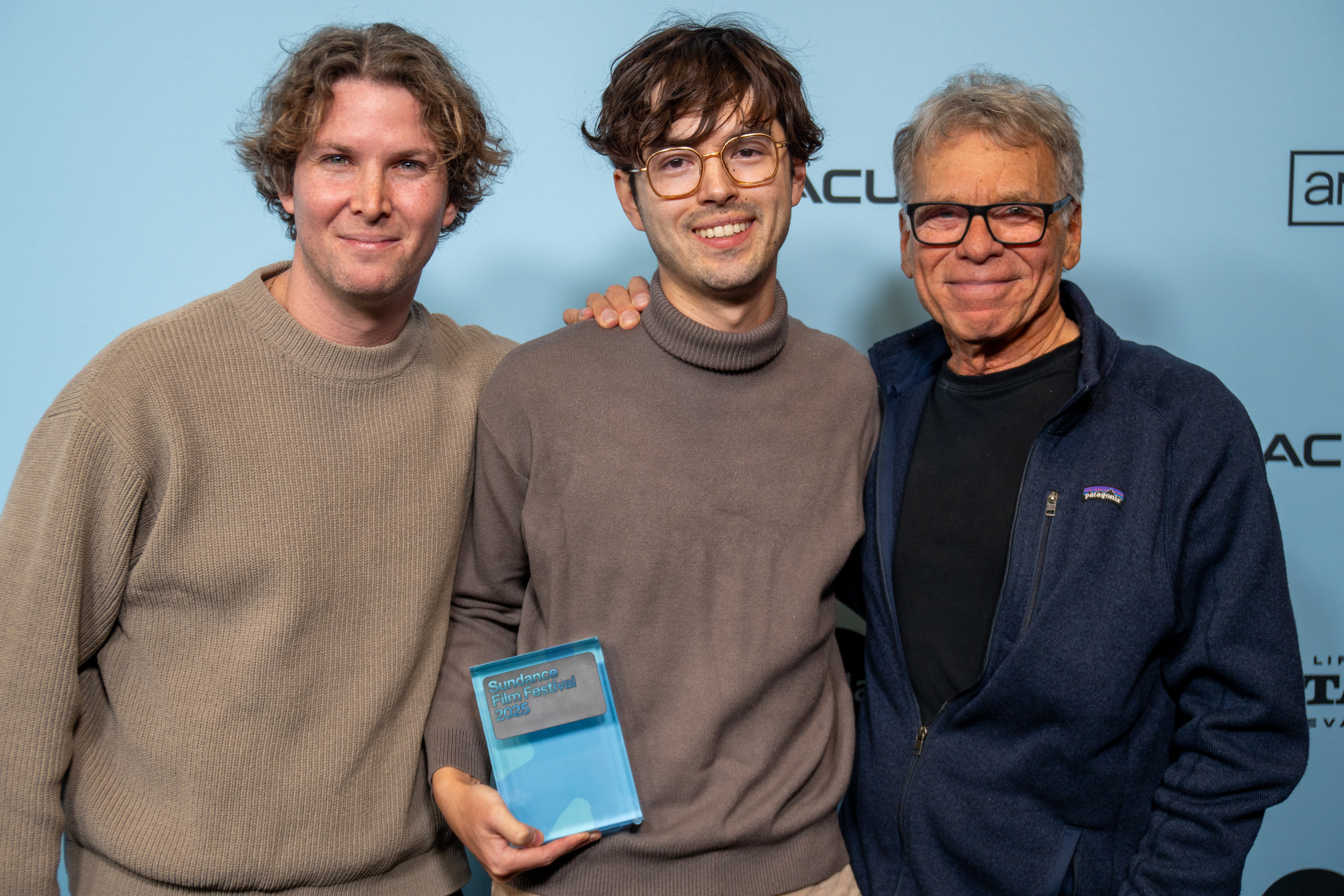
Alex Astrachan (left), James Sweeney (center), and David Permut (right) at the 2025 Sundance Film Festival, with the Audience Award Dramatic

Twinless premiered in the U.S. Dramatic Competition at the 2025 Sundance Film Festival on January 23, 2025. In April 2025, Republic Pictures sold the film to other studios for its theatrical release, with Lionsgate and Roadside Attractions acquiring the U.S. distribution rights and Sony Pictures Worldwide Acquisitions acquiring the international rights. It was released on September 5, 2025.

When the film was made available to festival viewers who opted to view the film remotely online during Sundance, clips and GIFs from the film showing O'Brien's character having sex were leaked online and shared across social media platforms. The clips were later taken down after copyright infringement claims were filed, and the film itself was later removed from the Sundance online platform.

=== Home media ===
The film was released on Blu-ray on May 12, 2026.

== Reception ==
=== Critical response ===
On the review aggregator website Rotten Tomatoes, 97% of 150 critics' reviews are positive, with an average rating of 8/10. The website's consensus reads: "James Sweeney's sophomore outing reveals a twisty, grief-ridden journey of the unexpected – buoyed by a perfectly sensitive Dylan O'Brien." Metacritic, which uses a weighted average, assigned the film a score of 79 out of 100, based on 28 critics, indicating "generally favorable" reviews. Audiences polled by CinemaScore gave the film an average grade of A on an A+ to F scale.

Benjamin Lee of The Guardian termed it a "dark, inventive comedy", adding that the "smart and highly unusual film earns its boundary-pushing because he never loses sight of the inescapable, human sadness at its core". The Hollywood Reporter's Lovia Gyarkye commended O'Brien's dual performances and was appreciative of Sweeney's craft in "shifting between dry humor, gutting devastation and emotional poignancy".

Commenting on Sweeney's direction, Peter Debruge of Variety wrote, "On just his second film, the gifted young helmer demonstrates a sophisticated sense of framing, pace and exquisitely uncomfortable dramatic tension".

=== Accolades ===
Award	Date of ceremony	Category	Nominee(s)	Result	Ref.
Astra Film Awards	January 9, 2026	Best Actor – Drama	Dylan O'Brien	Nominated	
Astra Film Awards	January 9, 2026	Best Indie Feature	Twinless	Won	
GLAAD Media Awards	March 5, 2026	Outstanding Film – Wide Release	Twinless	Nominated	
Independent Spirit Awards	February 15, 2026	Best Feature	Twinless	Nominated	
Independent Spirit Awards	February 15, 2026	Best Lead Performance	Dylan O'Brien	Nominated	
Independent Spirit Awards	February 15, 2026	Best Screenplay	James Sweeney	Nominated	
Miami Film Festival	November 1, 2025	Vanguard Award	Dylan O'Brien	Won	
New York Film Critics Online	December 15, 2025	Best Actor	Dylan O'Brien	Nominated	
New York Film Critics Online	December 15, 2025	Best Screenplay	James Sweeney	Nominated	
Palm Springs International Film Festival	January 3, 2025	Directors to Watch	James Sweeney	Won	
San Francisco Bay Area Critics Circle Awards	December 14, 2025	Special Citation for Independent Cinema	Twinless	Won	
Savannah Film Festival	November 1, 2025	Lumiere Award	Dylan O'Brien	Won	
Seattle International Film Festival	May 25, 2025	Best Director	James Sweeney	Won	
Seattle International Film Festival	May 25, 2025	Best Film	Twinless	Runner-up	
Sundance Film Festival	January 31, 2025	Audience Award – U.S. Dramatic	Twinless	Won	
Sundance Film Festival	January 31, 2025	Grand Jury Prize – U.S. Dramatic	Twinless	Nominated	
Sundance Film Festival	January 31, 2025	U.S. Dramatic Special Jury Award for Acting	Dylan O'Brien	Won	
