= Companion (film) =

2025 film by Drew Hancock

- Theatrical release poster
- Directed by: Drew Hancock
- Written by: Drew Hancock
- Produced by: Raphael Margules; J. D. Lifshitz; Zach Cregger; Roy Lee
- Starring: Sophie Thatcher; Jack Quaid; Lukas Gage; Megan Suri; Harvey Guillén; Rupert Friend
- Cinematography: Eli Born
- Edited by: Brett W. Bachman; Josh Ethier
- Music by: Hrishikesh Hirway
- Production companies: New Line Cinema; BoulderLight Pictures
- Distributed by: Warner Bros. Pictures
- Release date: January 31, 2025 (United States)
- Running time: 97 minutes
- Country: United States
- Language: English
- Budget: $10 million
- Box office: $37 million

Companion is a 2025 American thriller film written and directed by Drew Hancock, in his directorial debut. It was produced by Zach Cregger, Roy Lee, Raphael Margules, and J. D. Lifshitz. Sophie Thatcher and Jack Quaid star as a couple on a weekend getaway with friends at a remote cabin, which unravels into chaos after a revelation that one of the guests is a companion robot.

Companion was released in the United States by Warner Bros. Pictures on January 31, 2025. The film received positive reviews from critics and grossed $37 million on a budget of $10 million.

== Plot ==
A young woman, Iris, recalls meeting her boyfriend, Josh Beeman, for the first time, and states the only other time she was that happy was the day she killed him. In the following scene, Iris wakes up in the car as she and Josh travel to an isolated lake house. There they meet Josh's friends Kat and Eli, Eli's boyfriend Patrick, and Kat's boyfriend Sergey, who owns the house. Josh tells Iris to "act happy," but tensions are apparent: Kat seems to dislike Iris and flirt with Josh, and openly admits to Iris that Sergey is married and she is only with him for his money.

The next day, while Iris is alone at the lake, Sergey attempts to sexually assault her. Iris stabs and kills him in self-defense. Blood-soaked and panicked, she returns to the house, attempting to explain what happened. Josh tells her, "Iris, go to sleep," and Iris shuts down.

As Iris awakens tied to a chair, Josh informs her that she is a companion robot he is renting from the robotics company Empathix. Her emotions and intelligence are controlled by an app on his phone, she is unable to lie, and this is his farewell before he deactivates her. While Josh is distracted by Kat, Iris breaks free, steals Josh's phone, and flees into the forest. Using the app, she boosts her intelligence setting from 40% to 100%, disables her voice commands, and begins to plan her escape.

Back at the house, Josh admits to Eli and Patrick that he jailbroke Iris's programming to remove the restrictions against harming others, then orchestrated the encounter at the lake so Iris would kill Sergey, allowing him and Kat to blame his death on Iris and steal $12 million in cash from Sergey's safe. Eli and Patrick were invited to corroborate Josh and Kat's story. Josh asks for Eli and Patrick's help locating Iris and offers them a three-way split on the stolen money, but Eli insists that Patrick should also get a share. Josh and Kat balk at Patrick receiving a share, as it's revealed Patrick is also a companion robot. Eli eventually agrees and takes a gun from Sergey's safe, and the group splits up to find Iris.

In the woods, Iris hides from Patrick and Eli and overhears them talking about Josh's plan. Patrick then admits to Eli that he knows he is a companion robot but loves him regardless. Iris tries to escape while they are distracted, but she is spotted and in the ensuing struggle she shoots and kills Eli with the gun.

Iris returns to the house and attempts to escape in Josh's self-driving car, but Josh uses Sergey's phone and reports the car stolen, causing it to stop and lock Iris in. Josh calls Iris and asks her to come back, but she reveals she knows his plan, and instead breaks up with him with a series of cliches.

Enraged and desperate, Josh reprograms Patrick to be his companion, boosts his aggression, and orders him to track down and retrieve Iris. Iris is discovered and handcuffed by police officer Deputy Hendrix. Patrick finds them, kills Hendrix, and puts Iris to sleep, driving her and Hendrix's body back to the house in the police car. Disgusted by Josh and the discovery of Hendrix's body, Kat tries to leave with her cut of the money, but Patrick stabs and kills her when Josh tells him to "stop her."

Josh calls Empathix to collect Iris, claiming she is malfunctioning, then revives the handcuffed Iris to once again say goodbye. While waiting, Josh rants to Iris about being a "nice guy" who deserves the money. When Iris belittles him, he decreases her intelligence to 0%, making her an automaton. He then forces her to set her arm on fire with a candle and shoot herself in the head, shutting her down.

Empathix workers, Sid and Teddy, arrive to collect Iris. While they seem to accept Josh's version of events, as they leave Sid explains that Empathix robots record everything they experience, and the recordings are stored in their abdominal area. Learning that the recordings have probably remained intact, Josh commands Patrick to kill the workers and retrieve Iris. Patrick kills Sid, but before he can kill Teddy, a rebooted Iris intervenes. She breaks Josh's control over Patrick by awakening Patrick's memories of Eli. Heartbroken, Patrick kills himself with a cattle prod.

As thanks for saving him, Teddy frees Iris from the app's control, restoring her intelligence and giving her the ability to lie. She returns to the house and, after a struggle, kills Josh with an electric corkscrew. The next morning, she peels the burnt "skin" off her hand, exposing her metal endoskeleton and leaves the house with the $12 million in Sergey's car. While driving away, Iris sees another man driving with a companion identical to her. Iris smiles and waves her robotic hand at the confused other companion.

== Cast ==
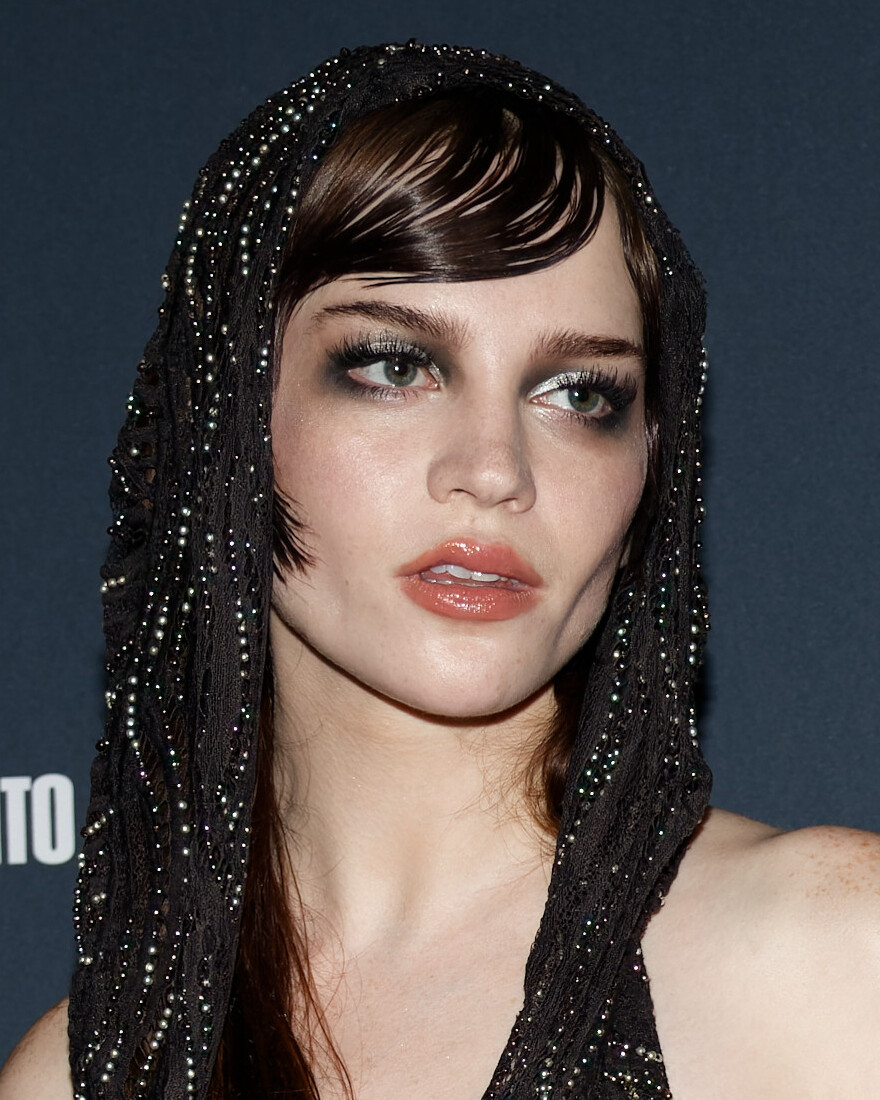
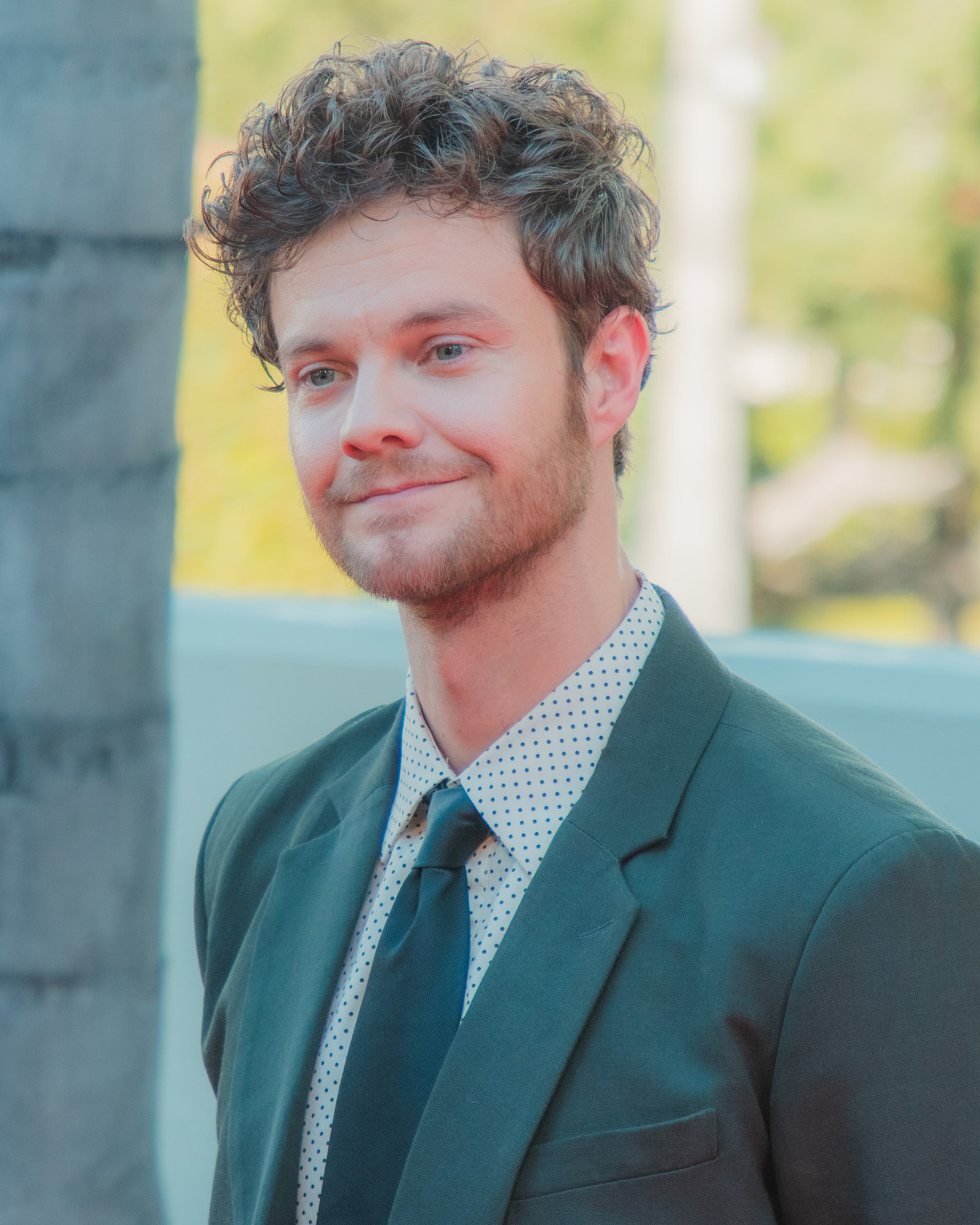
Sophie Thatcher and Jack Quaid star as Iris and Josh.
- Sophie Thatcher as Iris
- Jack Quaid as Josh Beeman
- Lukas Gage as Patrick, Eli's boyfriend
- Megan Suri as Kat, Josh's friend, and Sergey's girlfriend
- Harvey Guillén as Eli, Josh's friend and Patrick's boyfriend
- Rupert Friend as Sergey, Kat's boyfriend
- Jaboukie Young-White as Teddy, Empathix worker
- Matthew J. McCarthy as Sid, co-Empathix worker
- Marc Menchaca as Deputy Hendrix

== Production ==
In February 2023, it was reported that Companion was in the works from New Line Cinema with a script from Drew Hancock, who was also set to direct, and Zach Cregger, Raphael Margules, J. D. Lifshitz, and Roy Lee set to produce. Cregger originally planned to direct but suggested Hancock take over. In May 2023, Jack Quaid joined the cast. In June, Harvey Guillén, Lukas Gage, Megan Suri, Sophie Thatcher, and Rupert Friend were added to the cast. Principal photography took place in the New York counties of Dutchess and Putnam, including Garrison (the lake house), Fishkill (the opening sequence), Beacon, and the Putnam Valley. Filming was completed in January 2024. Hrishikesh Hirway composed the score.

== Release ==
Companion was released theatrically in the United States by Warner Bros. Pictures on January 31, 2025, including in IMAX. It was previously set to be released on January 10, 2025. The film was released on digital on February 18, followed by a 4K UHD, Blu-ray, and DVD release on April 1.

Warner Bros. spent $29 million promoting the film. Deadline Hollywood reported rumors that Warner Bros. had allocated only $10 million on television advertisements in the United States, with iSpot indicating an even lower US TV spend of $830,000 primarily on an NFL playoff spot. Social media analytics firm RelishMix reported that online marketing led to 170 million interactions across social media platforms, with online users generating "positive convo" regarding the cast and advertisements that referenced the romantic genre before revealing the film's actual genre. Polling by PostTrak said the most influential pieces of marketing for Companion were in-theater trailers (27%), friends/family (13%), online trailers (8%), TV spots (5%), online video ads (5%), and reviews (5%).

== Reception ==
=== Box office ===
Companion grossed $20.9 million in the United States and Canada, and $16.1 million in other territories, for a worldwide total of $37 million. In the United States and Canada, Companion was released alongside Dog Man and Valiant One and was projected to gross $8–10 million from 3,285 theaters in its opening weekend. It made $4 million on its first day, including an estimated $1.7 million from Monday and Thursday night previews. It went on to debut to $9.3 million, finishing second behind Dog Man. Exit polling indicated that 43% of attendees saw the film because it was advertised as horror and 26% went for Thatcher. Men accounted for 51% of the opening weekend audience, with people aged 18 to 34 comprising 68%, those 24 to 34 making up around 40%, and IMAX and premium large format screens contributing 34% (with IMAX accounting for $1.6 million (17%) of the opening). The film made $3 million in its second weekend and $1.8 million in its third before dropping out of the box office top ten in its fourth. Deadline Hollywood described it as profitable.

=== Critical response ===
On the review aggregator website Rotten Tomatoes, 93% of 262 critics' reviews are positive, with an average rating of 7.5/10. The website's consensus reads: "A fiendishly clever contraption that doesn't rest on the laurels of its twists, Companion thrillingly puts the demented into domestic bliss." Metacritic, which uses a weighted average, assigned the film a score of 70 out of 100, based on 40 critics, indicating "generally favorable" reviews. Audiences surveyed by CinemaScore gave the film an average grade of "B+" on an A+ to F scale, while those polled by PostTrak gave it 4 out of 5 stars.

Chris Evangelista of /Film gave Companion nine out of ten, calling it "the first great film of 2025" and praising its originality and the performances of Thatcher and Quaid. Kevin Maher of The Times gave it three out of five, saying it was "essentially a 'robot girlfriend' movie (think Fritz Lang's Metropolis or Megan Fox's Subservience), but one that begins on astonishingly strong form", and praising Thatcher's performance. Stephanie Banbury of the Financial Times also gave it three out of five, writing, "A robot that turns against its puny human controller is hardly a new idea, but the current anxiety around AI obviously gives Companion topical punch. Otherwise, it veers between the comic and visceral. The colours are Barbie-bright, right down to the pink title sequence; writer-director Drew Hancock is similarly aiming to give us sexual politics in a popcorn box, but with added stage blood."

Benjamin Lee of The Guardian was more critical, writing: "The film is more sleekly made than it is thoughtfully written... with convenient inconsistencies, a short yet stretched runtime and a rather flat fight-to-the-death Terminator-esque finale leaving things on a so-what shrug. For a film about advanced technology, it's all awfully simple." He gave it two out of five. The A.V. Club's Jesse Hassenger gave it a C+, writing, "Companion's observations about relationship power dynamics are mostly just Comedy Ex Machina with the faintest hint of Her, neutered with a very Big Studio approach to inherently kinky material."

=== Accolades ===
Award	Date of ceremony	Category	Nominee(s)	Result	Ref.
Palm Springs International Film Festival	January 3, 2025	Directors to Watch	Drew Hancock	Won	
Astra Midseason Movie Awards	July 3, 2025	Best Horror	Companion	Runner-up	
Astra Midseason Movie Awards	July 3, 2025	Best Actress	Sophie Thatcher	Nominated	
Critics' Choice Super Awards	August 7, 2025	Best Science Fiction/Fantasy Movie	Companion	Nominated	
Critics' Choice Super Awards	August 7, 2025	Best Actor in a Science Fiction/Fantasy Movie	Jack Quaid	Nominated	
Critics' Choice Super Awards	August 7, 2025	Best Actress in a Science Fiction/Fantasy Movie	Sophie Thatcher	Won	
