= Myrsini Aristidou =

Cypriot director

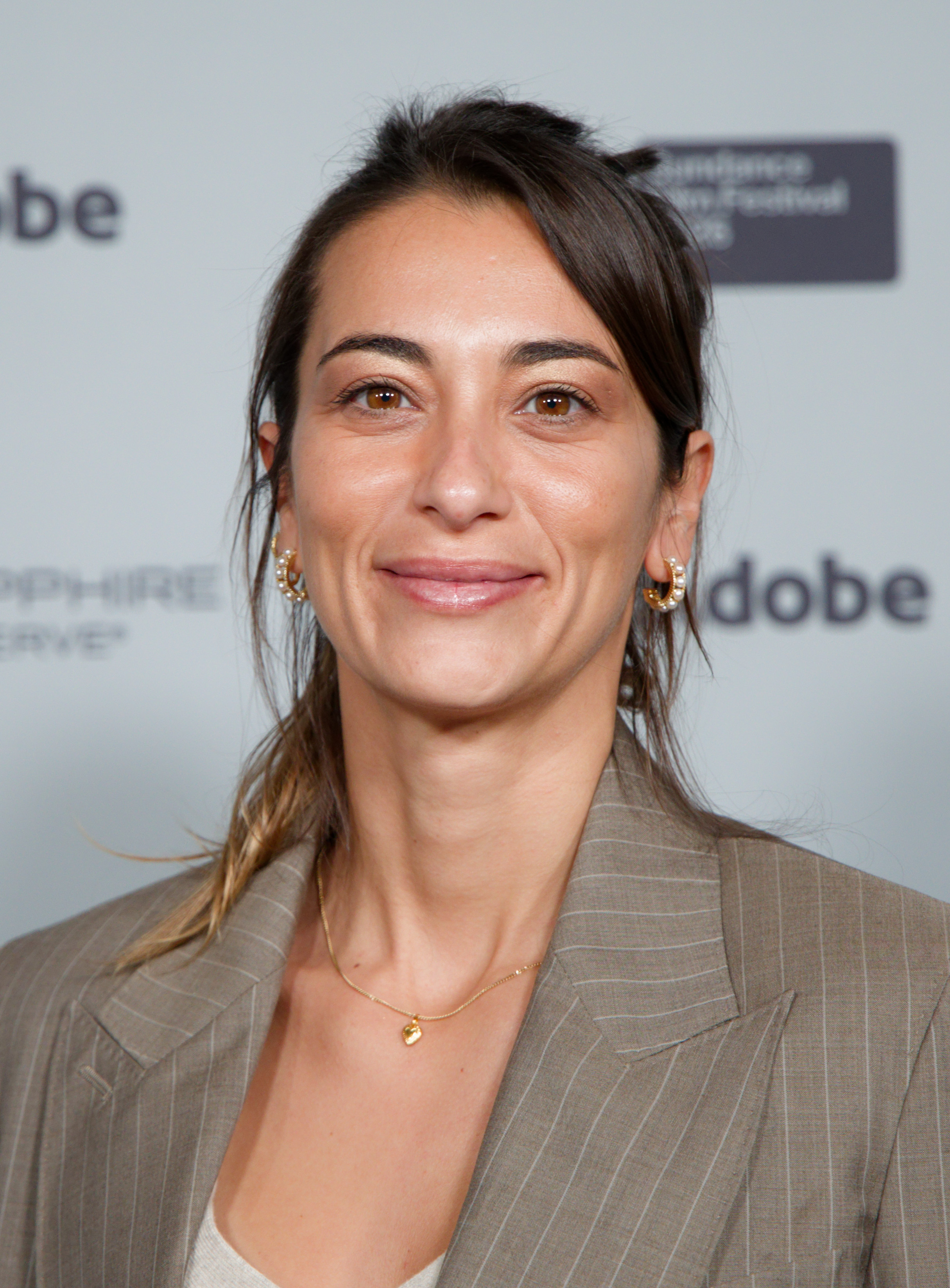
- Aristidou at the 2026 Sundance Film Festival
- Born: Limassol, Cyprus
- Occupations: Director, writer
- Years active: 2013–present

Myrsini Aristidou (Greek: Μυρσίνη Αριστείδου) is a Greek Cypriot film director, screenwriter, and producer. She is best known for her short films Semele and Aria, and her debut feature film, Hold onto Me (Κράτα Με). Hold Onto Me premiered at the 2026 Sundance Film Festival and won the Audience Award in the World Cinema Dramatic Competition. Her films have screened at international film festivals including Venice Film Festival, Berlin International Film Festival, Sundance Film Festival, Toronto International Film Festival, and Tribeca Festival.

== Early life and education ==
Aristidou was born and raised in Limassol, Cyprus. She holds a Bachelor of Fine Arts in Film and History of Art from Pratt Institute in New York, and a Master of Fine Arts in Film Directing from NYU Tisch School of the Arts. In 2016, she founded her production company One Six One Films operating in Cyprus and internationally. She has been selected to participate at the Cannes Cinéfondation Residence, and the TIFF Talent Lab, while also winning the Jerusalem Sam Spiegel Scriptwriter Lab's Emerging Filmmaker Prize.

== Career ==
Aristidou’s debut short film, Not Now (2013), established her minimalist visual approach and focus on interpersonal relationships, winning Best Directing at the International Short Film Festival of Cyprus (2014).

Her short film Semele (2015) premiered at the Toronto International Film Festival and won the Special Jury Prize (Generation Kplus) at the 2016 Berlin International Film Festival, with the jury noting its “sober and unsentimental approach” as “very touching.” The story, centered on a young girl hitchhiking to reach her estranged father’s workplace, was praised for its emotional depth. It screened in more than 70 festivals worldwide, including Tribeca Festival, and won awards such as Best Short Film at the Cayman Islands International Film Festival (2016) and the Jury Award at the New Orleans Film Festival (2016), and the Signis Award Prize at the Guanajuato International Film Festival. The film was later broadcast by Canal+ France.

In 2017, Aristidou short film Aria premiered in the Orizzonti section at the Venice Film Festival and later screened at the Sundance Film Festival. Set in contemporary Athens, it follows seventeen-year-old Aria who works at the local kebab place, and is waiting for a driving lesson with her father, only for him to arrive and drop off a young Chinese immigrant for a day. The film navigates questions of responsibility, cultural identity, and belonging. Aria was developed and produced with the support of Canal+, the CNC COSIP (France’s national film support fund), the Spike Lee Film Production Fund, and the Cypriot Ministry of Culture.

Aristidou’s debut feature, Hold onto Me (Κράτα Με), is a Cyprus–Denmark–Greece–U.S. co-production shot by cinematographer Lasse Ulvedal Tolbøll. It is backed by the Cyprus Deputy Ministry of Culture, ERT (Hellenic Broadcasting Corporation), the Danish Film Institute, the Hellenic Film and Audiovisual Centre, the Black Family Film Foundation, and the Sam Spiegel International Film Lab. The film stars Christos Passalis in the lead role, alongside Maria Petrova, a young non-actress, and a Greek-Cypriot ensemble cast. The film had its premiere at the Sundance Film Festival and won the Audience Award: World Cinema Dramatic in 2026. It was also selected as the first Cyprus' first-ever entry for the Best International Feature Film at the 99th Academy Awards.

== Filmography ==
Year	Film	Director	Writer	Editor	Producer	Notes
2013	Not Now	Yes	Yes	Yes	Yes	Short Film
2015	Semele	Yes	Yes	Yes	Yes	Short Film
2017	Aria	Yes	Yes	Yes	Yes	Short Film
2026	Hold onto Me	Yes	Yes	Yes	Yes	Feature Film

== Accolades ==
- Sundance Film Festival, Audience Award: World Cinema Dramatic Competition Winner — Hold onto Me (2026)
- Berlin International Film Festival, Special Jury Prize (Generation Kplus) — Semele (2016)
- Toronto International Film Festival, Official Selection – Short Cuts Programme — Semele (2015)
- Tribeca Film Festival, Official Selection – Short Narrative Competition — Semele (2016)
- Cayman Islands International Film Festival, Best Short Film — Semele (2016)
- New Orleans Film Festival, Jury Award – Narrative Short Competition — Semele (2016)
- Athens International Film Festival, Best Short Film – Greek Competition — Semele (2016)
- International Short Film Festival of Cyprus (ISFFC), Best Cypriot Short Film — Semele (2016)
- Venice International Film Festival, Official Selection – Orizzonti Short Films Competition — Aria (2017)
- Sundance Film Festival, Official Selection – International Narrative Shorts — Aria (2018)
- TIFF Talent Lab, Selected Filmmaker (2017 cohort)
- Cannes Cinéfondation Residence, Selected Resident Filmmaker (2017)
- Jerusalem Sam Spiegel Film Lab, Emerging Filmmaker Prize for Hold onto Me (2018)
- Eurimages, Featured Director – European Voices Interview Series (2021)
- NYU Tisch – Spike Lee Film Production Fund, Award Recipient (2016)
- Black Family Film Foundation, Fellowship Award (2023)
- Cyprus Deputy Ministry of Culture, Feature Film Production Grant for Hold onto Me (2023)
- ERT (Hellenic Broadcasting Corporation), Co-production Support Award (2023)
- Danish Film Institute, Minority Co-production Support (2023)
- Hellenic Film Centre, Feature Film Production Support (2023)
