= List of Cypriot submissions for the Academy Award for Best International Feature Film =

Best International Feature Film submissions from Cyprus

Highlights
- Debut: 2026
- Submissions: 1
- Nominations: none
- Oscar winners: none

Cyprus has submitted films for the Academy Award for Best International Feature Film since 2026. The award is handed out annually by the United States Academy of Motion Picture Arts and Sciences to a feature-length motion picture produced outside the United States that contains primarily non-English dialogue.

Cyprus first ever submission, Hold onto Me, was directed by Myrsini Aristidou.

== Submissions ==
The Academy of Motion Picture Arts and Sciences has invited the film industries of various countries to submit their best film for the Academy Award for Best International Feature Film since 1956. The International Feature Film Committee oversees the process and reviews all the submitted films. Following this, they vote via secret ballot to determine the five nominees for the award.

Below is a list of the films that have been submitted by the Republic of Cyprus by year, and its respective Academy Awards ceremony:

Year (Ceremony)	Film title used in nomination	Original title	Language(s)	Director	Result
2026 (99th)	Hold onto Me	Κράτα Με	Greek	Myrsini Aristidou	Pending

== See also ==
- List of Academy Award winners and nominees for Best International Feature Film
- List of Academy Award-winning foreign language films
