= Hold onto Me =

2026 Cypriot drama film

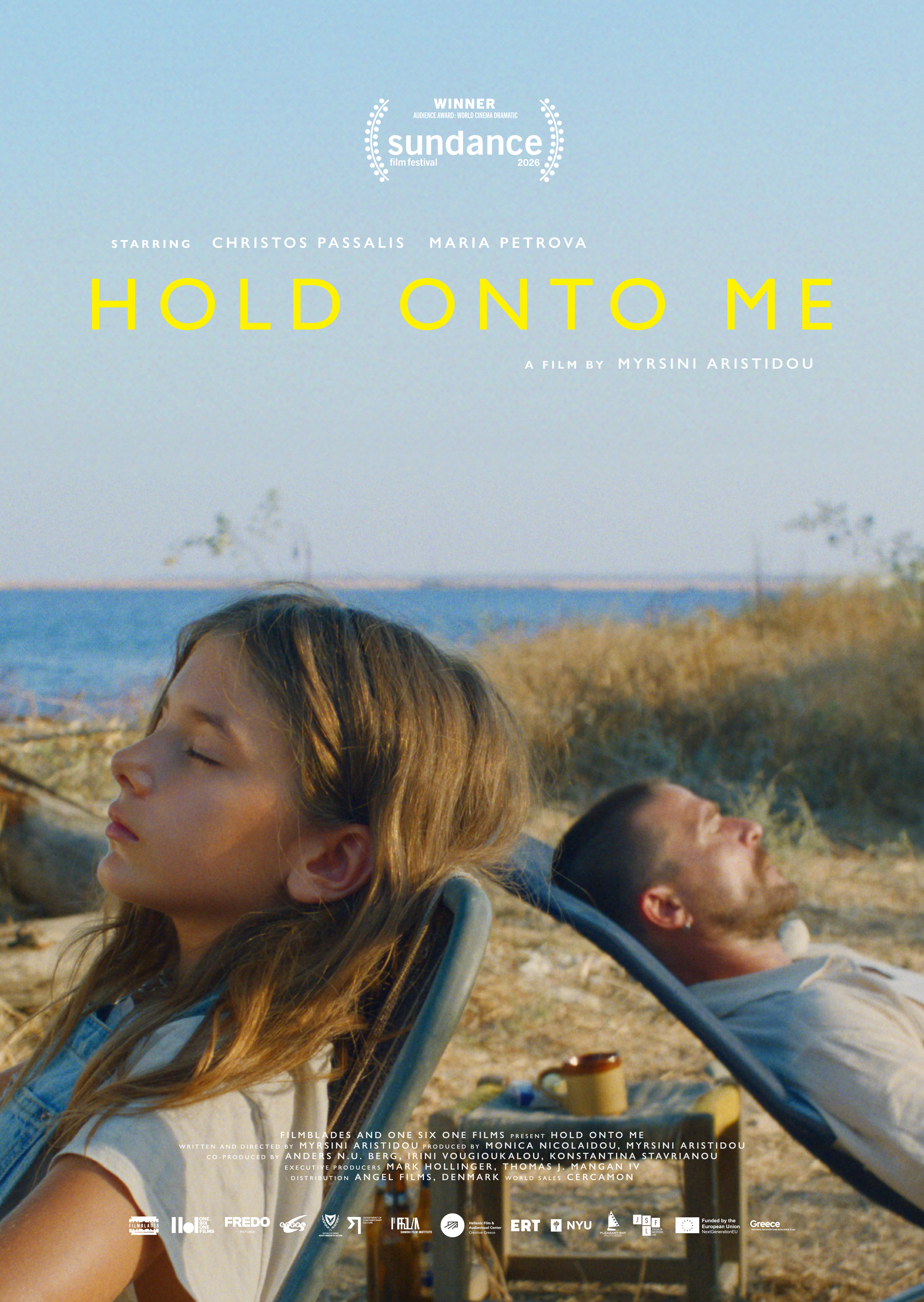
- International promotional poster
- Greek: Κράτα Με
- Directed by: Myrsini Aristidou
- Written by: Myrsini Aristidou
- Produced by: Myrsini Aristidou; Monica Nicolaidou
- Starring: Christos Passalis; Maria Petrova
- Cinematography: Lasse Ulvedal Tolbøll
- Edited by: Myrsini Aristidou; Jenna Mangulad
- Music by: Alex Weston
- Release date: January 2026 (Sundance)
- Running time: 102 minutes
- Countries: Cyprus; Denmark; Greece
- Language: Greek

Hold onto Me (Greek: Κράτα Με, romanized: Kráta Me) is a 2026 drama film written and directed by Myrsini Aristidou. A co-production of Cyprus, Denmark, and Greece, it stars Christos Passalis, Maria Petrova, Jenny Sallo, Aulona Lupa, and Loukas Zikos.

The film had its world premiere in the World Cinema Dramatic Competition of the 2026 Sundance Film Festival, where it won the Audience Award: World Cinema Dramatic. It was the first Cypriot film to premiere at the festival and the first Greek-language film to win an award.

It was selected as the first Cyprus' first-ever entry for the Best International Feature Film at the 99th Academy Awards.

== Plot ==
Eleven-year-old Iris learns that her estranged father, Aris, has returned to town for his own father's funeral. Wanting to get to know him, Iris finds him in the dilapidated shipyard where he has been living in isolation.

== Cast ==
- Christos Passalis as Aris
- Maria Petrova as Iris
- Jenny Sallo as Danae
- Aulona Lupa as Stella
- Loukas Zikos as Boat Owner
- Achilleas Grammatikopoulos as Elias
- Andreas Koutsoftas as Police Officer
- Giorgos Kyriacou as Kostas

== Production ==
Hold onto Me is a Cypriot–Danish–Greek–American co-production by Monica Nicolaidou for Filmblades and Myrsini Aristidou’s One Six One Films, in co-production with Anders NU Berg for Fredo Pictures (Denmark) and Konstantina Stavrianou and Rena Vougioukalou for Athens-based Graal SA. Mark Hollinger and Thomas J. Mangan IV serve as executive producers for Pleasant Bay Pictures and Mango Productions. The film received support from the Cyprus Deputy Ministry of Culture, ERT SA, the Danish Film Institute, the Hellenic Film & Audiovisual Center, the Black Family Film Foundation at NYU Tisch, Pleasant Bay Pictures and the Sam Spiegel International Film Lab, where the project received the Emerging Filmmaker Prize.

International sales for the film are handled by Cercamon.

=== Development ===
The project was developed over several years and expands on themes explored in Aristidou's earlier short films Semele (2015) and Aria (2017), which also focus on young girls navigating complex family relationships. During development the project participated in several international programmes including the Cinéfondation Résidence of the Cannes Film Festival, the Sam Spiegel International Film Lab in Jerusalem, and the TIFF Talent Lab. At the Sam Spiegel International Film Lab the project received the Emerging Filmmaker Prize.

=== Filming ===
Principal photography took place in Limassol and Nicosia in Cyprus. The film was shot by Danish cinematographer Lasse Ulvedal Tolbøll.

== Themes ==
Critics highlighted the film’s exploration of adolescence and the shifting dynamics between a child and an absent parent. Several reviews noted that the narrative centers on Iris’s attempts to forge a relationship with her estranged father, portraying both the emotional volatility of youth and the fragile process of reconciliation.

== Release ==
Hold onto Me had its world premiere in the World Cinema Dramatic Competition at the 2026 Sundance Film Festival, where it won the Audience Award: World Cinema Dramatic. Cyprus Mail and CBN reported that the premiere screening was sold out and received a double standing ovation.

The film was the first Cypriot film to premiere at the Sundance Film Festival and the first Greek-language film at the festival to win an award.

=== Distribution ===
Distribution in Denmark was acquired by Angel Films.

== Reception ==
=== Critical response ===
Following its premiere at the 2026 Sundance Film Festival, Hold onto Me received positive reviews from critics.

Writing for RogerEbert.com, critic Marya E. Gates praised Aristidou’s direction and the emotional tension of the film’s final act, noting that she "found [herself] holding [her] breath more than once" and commending the film for ending "without any traditional closure", concluding: "More of that, please."

Carlos Aguilar of Variety described the film as a heartfelt drama about the evolving bond between a young girl and her estranged father.

Cineuropa highlighted the film’s coming-of-age perspective and the dynamic between Maria Petrova and Christos Passalis, noting the emotional progression of their relationship throughout the story.

The Playlist praised the film's "enthralling performances" and strong direction.

Next Best Picture described the film as "a profoundly rewarding experience" that explores how fractured relationships can still carry a powerful instinct for connection.

The Film Verdict emphasized the film’s exploration of father-daughter relationships and the emotional intimacy of the performances by Christos Passalis and Maria Petrova.

Loud and Clear Reviews described the film as a "visually driven" and emotionally mature debut feature that captures the hardships of childhood and parenthood.

On Rotten Tomatoes, the film holds an approval rating of 100% based on 13 critic reviews, with an average rating of 8/10.

=== Accolades ===
Year	Festival	Award	Result
2026	Sundance Film Festival	Audience Award: World Cinema Dramatic	Won

== See also ==
- List of submissions to the 99th Academy Awards for Best International Feature Film
- List of Cypriot submissions for the Academy Award for Best International Feature Film
