= Maria (2024 film) =

2024 film by Pablo Larraín

- Release poster
- Directed by: Pablo Larraín
- Written by: Steven Knight
- Produced by: Juan de Dios Larraín; Jonas Dornbach; Lorenzo Mieli; Pablo Larraín; Janine Jackowski; Maren Ade; Simone Gattoni
- Starring: Angelina Jolie; Pierfrancesco Favino; Alba Rohrwacher; Haluk Bilginer; Kodi Smit-McPhee
- Cinematography: Edward Lachman
- Edited by: Sofía Subercaseaux
- Production companies: Fremantle; The Apartment Pictures; Komplizen Film; Fábula; FilmNation Entertainment
- Distributed by: 01 Distribution (Italy); StudioCanal (Germany); Netflix (United States)
- Release dates: August 29, 2024 (Venice); November 27, 2024 (United States); January 1, 2025 (Italy); February 6, 2025 (Germany)
- Running time: 124 minutes
- Countries: Italy; Germany; Chile; United States
- Languages: English; Greek
- Box office: $25.3 million

Maria is a 2024 biographical psychological drama film directed by Pablo Larraín and written by Steven Knight. It is an international co-production between Italy, Chile, Germany and the United States. The film stars Angelina Jolie as opera singer Maria Callas, and follows the week before her death in 1977 in Paris, as she reflects on her life and career. It also stars Pierfrancesco Favino, Alba Rohrwacher, Haluk Bilginer, Stephen Ashfield, Valeria Golino, and Kodi Smit-McPhee in supporting roles. It is the third film in Larraín's trilogy of iconic 20th-century women, following Jackie (2016), and Spencer (2021).

The film premiered at the 81st Venice International Film Festival on August 29, 2024, where it competed for the Golden Lion and received generally positive reviews from critics, who singled out Jolie's performance for praise. It was released in select theaters in the United States on November 27, 2024, before streaming on Netflix on December 11. It was theatrically released in Italy by 01 Distribution on January 1, 2025, before its release in Germany by StudioCanal on February 6. The film earned a nomination for Best Cinematography at the 97th Academy Awards, while Jolie was nominated for Best Actress in a Motion Picture – Drama at the 82nd Golden Globe Awards.

== Plot ==
In 1977, Maria Callas lives in an apartment in Paris, with her butler Ferruccio and housekeeper Bruna. She is attempting to sing again after a years-long hiatus in her opera career due to her declining health. While Ferruccio insists that she see a doctor and take the correct amount of medication, Maria continues to overuse Mandrax, which she claims helps her despite its side effects. Maria informs Ferruccio and Bruna that a television crew will be arriving to interview her about her life. The crew arrives, led by a young filmmaker named "Mandrax". It becomes clear that Mandrax and his cameraman are a hallucination caused by the medication, with Ferruccio and Bruna not seeing them. Over the week, Maria also attends private sessions with conductor Jeffrey Tate to learn if she can perform again.

Prompted by Mandrax's "interviews" and hallucinations, Maria begins recalling memories of her former love affair with Greek business magnate Aristotle Onassis, who would eventually marry Jackie Kennedy. Although she initially declined his advances in 1957, she quickly fell in love with him and left her husband Giovanni Battista Meneghini. She eventually left Onassis as he and the public scrutiny around their relationship constrained her. However, she still secretly saw him on his deathbed and admitted that she did love him.

Over the week, Maria continues to hallucinate due to her overuse of Mandrax. The hallucinations cause her to remember her teenage self during World War II being forced by her mother to sing for Italian and German officers in exchange for money. One day, she meets with her older sister Yakinthi, and they reconcile over how their mother treated them.

Maria finally agrees to see Dr. Fontainebleau, initially lying about her drug usage in their first appointment. Upon their second appointment, Fontainebleau reveals that her health has worsened after seeing medical reports given by Ferruccio, stating that she may no longer be able to sing. After this, Maria attends a final session with Tate, bringing an audio recorder to record her voice. It becomes clear that her singing voice has declined, unable to match her voice at the heights of her career, to her sorrow. A Le Figaro journalist reveals himself to have spied on the session and rudely questions her about her career before Ferruccio pushes him away.

Maria expresses gratitude to Ferruccio and Bruna for being beside her over the years. The next morning, when Ferruccio and Bruna are out for groceries, Maria triumphantly sings "Vissi d'arte" one last time in her apartment, leaving her windows open, having found peace with herself. Many Parisians on the street surround the apartment to listen, as well as Ferruccio and Bruna, silently moved by her performance. Ferruccio and Bruna arrive inside the apartment and discover Maria dead on the floor. Ferruccio calls Fontainebleau, reporting her death, before the authorities arrive.

== Cast ==
- Angelina Jolie as Maria Callas
  - Christiana Aloneftis as young Maria (1947)
  - Aggelina Papadopoulou as young Maria (1940)
  - Lidia Zelikman Kauders as young Maria (1930)
- Pierfrancesco Favino as Ferruccio, Maria's loyal butler
- Alba Rohrwacher as Bruna, Maria's loyal housekeeper
- Haluk Bilginer as Aristotle Onassis, Maria's former partner
- Kodi Smit-McPhee as Mandrax, Maria's hallucination in the form of a young filmmaker
- Stephen Ashfield as Jeffrey Tate, a conductor who worked with Maria at the end of her career
- Valeria Golino as Yakinthi Callas, Maria's older sister
  - Erofili Panagiotarea as young Yakinthi Callas
- Caspar Phillipson as John F. Kennedy
- Vincent Macaigne as Dr. Fontainebleau, a doctor sent by Ferruccio to check on Maria
- Lydia Koniordou as Litsa Callas, Maria's mother
- Alessandro Bressanello as Giovanni Battista Meneghini, Maria's ex-husband
- Lyes Salem as Waiter
- Suzie Kennedy as Marilyn Monroe

== Production ==
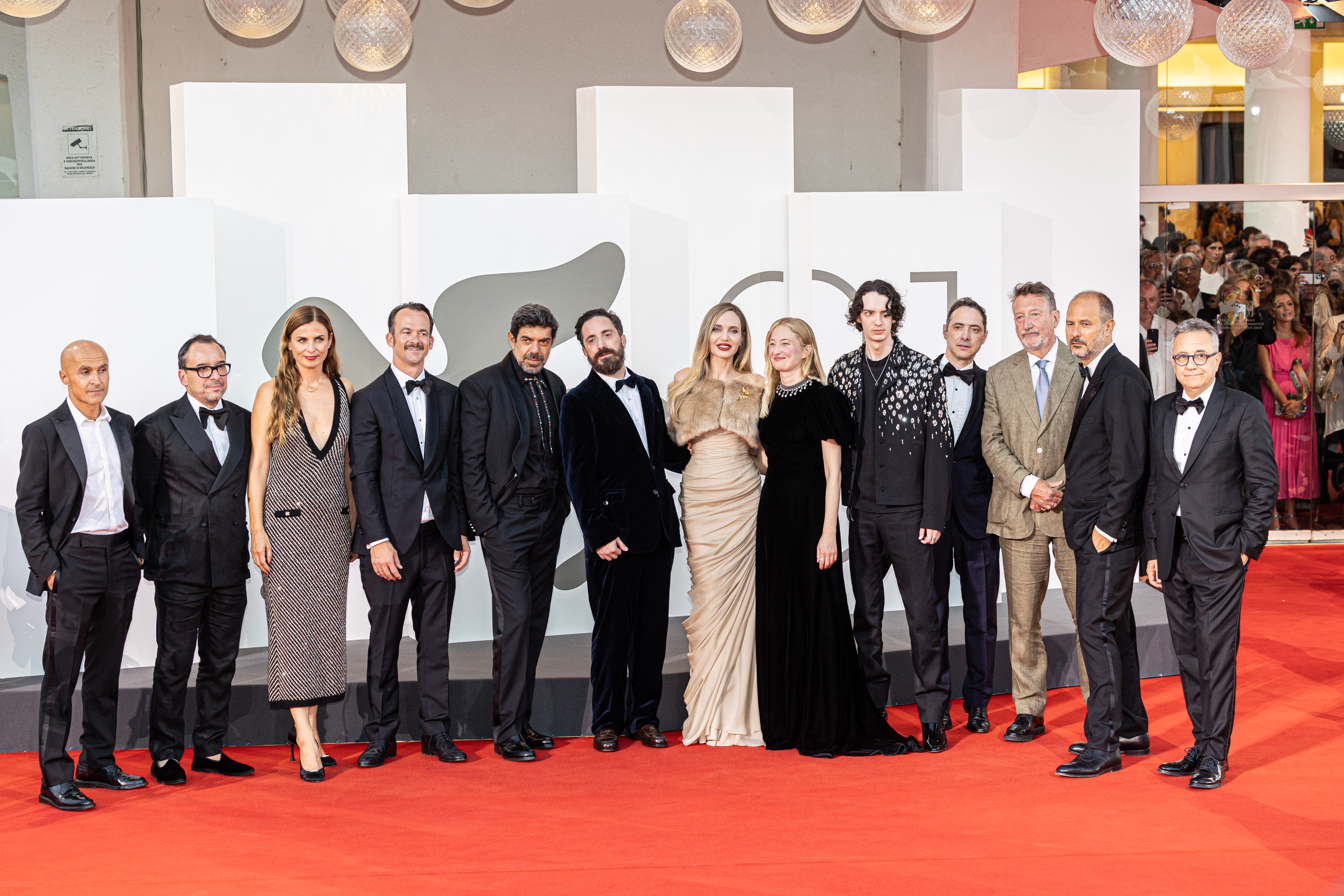
The cast of Maria at the 81st Venice International Film Festival

Pablo Larraín signed on to direct, working from a script by Steven Knight. The film is produced by Juan de Dios Larraín for Fabula, Lorenzo Mieli for The Apartment Pictures, a Fremantle company, and Jonas Dornbach for Komplizen Film whilst FilmNation Entertainment had boarded the film as co-producer and would handle international sales to the film. Angelina Jolie's casting in the lead role was announced in October 2022.

Filming began in Budapest in October 2023, with other filming locations including Paris; Milan, where scenes were filmed at the La Scala opera house; and Pyrgos and Katakolo in Greece. Scenes set on Onassis's yacht Christina O were filmed on the actual vessel, which was rented for filming. Production designer Guy Hendrix Dyas worked with Larraín on the visual concept, helping fuse the 1940 to 1970s style with the surreal musical sequences. According to the film's producers, no new fur was sourced for Jolie's garments which are based on Callas' original garments, with consultation with animal rights groups such as PETA regarding vintage fur items worn in the film from the archive collection of costume designer Massimo Cantini Parrini. Parrini created 60 dresses for Jolie.

To prepare for her role, Jolie spent seven months training to sing opera. She was deeply anxious and doubtful of her singing abilities at first; her vocal coach Eric Vetro recalls Jolie breaking into tears at one point. To replicate Callas' singing techniques, particularly her ability to hold notes, Vetro had her study a series of courses taught by Callas herself. Jolie also received guidance from opera singer Lori Stinson. For the scenes set during Callas' heyday, an estimated 90 to 95 percent of Callas' original recordings were used, with Jolie lip-synching along to these songs. However, Jolie's singing comes to the fore during the film's final act.

== Release ==
Maria had its world premiere at the 81st Venice International Film Festival on August 29, 2024, where it competed for the Golden Lion. On the day before its premiere, the film's American distribution rights were acquired by Netflix. Following the premiere, FilmNation Entertainment handled the film's international distribution deals, with Mubi releasing in Canada, 01 Distribution handling its release in Italy, and StudioCanal handling its release in the United Kingdom, Germany and Poland.

The film was released in select theaters in the United States on November 27, 2024, before streaming on Netflix on December 11. It was released in theatres in Italy on January 1, 2025, before being released in the UK and Ireland on January 10, and later in Germany on February 6. It was screened in February 2025 in the Limelight section of the 54th International Film Festival Rotterdam.

== Reception ==
=== Critical response ===
On the review aggregator website Rotten Tomatoes, 75% of 222 critics' reviews are positive, with an average rating of 6.7/10. The website's consensus reads: "Angelina Jolie unveils new highs within her emotional register in Pablo Larraín's Maria, keeping this tragic biopic compelling even when its theatrics go off-key." Metacritic, which uses a weighted average, assigned the film a score of 63 out of 100, based on 50 critics, indicating "generally favorable" reviews.

The film received an eight-minute standing ovation at the Sala Grande Theatre during its world premiere, bringing Angelina Jolie to tears. John Vandevert from OperaWire rebuked the film due to its, "distasteful portrayal of a multi-dimensional woman unable to be portrayed by anyone other than her." Filmmaker Paul Schrader cited it as among his favorite films of 2024.

=== Accolades ===
| Award | Date of ceremony | Category | Recipient(s) | Result | Ref. |
|---|---|---|---|---|---|
| Venice International Film Festival | September 7, 2024 | Golden Lion | Pablo Larraín | Nominated | |
| Middleburg Film Festival | October 20, 2024 | Lifetime Achievement Award for Cinematography | Edward Lachman | Won | |
| Celebration of Latino Cinema & Television | October 22, 2024 | Director Award – Film | Pablo Larraín | Won | |
| Savannah Film Festival | November 2, 2024 | Auteur Award | Pablo Larraín | Won | |
| Gotham Awards | December 2, 2024 | Performer Tribute | Angelina Jolie | Honored | |
| Astra Film Awards | December 8, 2024 | Best Actress | Angelina Jolie | Nominated | |
| Chicago Film Critics Association | December 12, 2024 | Best Costume Design | Massimo Cantini Parrini | Nominated | |
| St. Louis Film Critics Association | December 15, 2024 | Best Cinematography | Edward Lachman | Nominated | |
| St. Louis Film Critics Association | December 15, 2024 | Best Costume Design | Massimo Cantini Parrini | Nominated | |
| St. Louis Film Critics Association | December 15, 2024 | Best Soundtrack | Maria | Nominated | |
| San Francisco Bay Area Film Critics Circle | December 15, 2024 | Best Actress | Angelina Jolie | Nominated | |
| Dallas–Fort Worth Film Critics Association | December 18, 2024 | Best Actress | Angelina Jolie | 4th place | |
| Florida Film Critics Circle | December 20, 2024 | Best Art Direction / Production Design | Maria | Nominated | |
| Palm Springs International Film Festival | January 2, 2025 | Desert Palm Achievement for Best Actress | Angelina Jolie | Honored | |
| Golden Globe Awards | January 5, 2025 | Best Actress in a Motion Picture – Drama | Angelina Jolie | Nominated | |
| AARP Movies for Grownups Awards | January 11, 2025 | Best Time Capsule | Maria | Nominated | |
| Satellite Awards | January 26, 2025 | Best Actress in a Motion Picture – Drama | Angelina Jolie | Nominated | |
| Satellite Awards | January 26, 2025 | Best Cinematography | Edward Lachman | Nominated | |
| Satellite Awards | January 26, 2025 | Best Costume Design | Massimo Cantini Parrini | Nominated | |
| Set Decorators Society of America | February 2, 2025 | Best Achievement in Décor/Design of a Period Feature Film | Sandro Piccarozzi, Nóra Talmaier, Guy Hendrix Dyas | Nominated | |
| Santa Barbara International Film Festival | February 5, 2025 | Maltin Modern Master Award | Angelina Jolie | Honored | |
| Costume Designers Guild Awards | February 6, 2025 | Excellence in Period Film | Massimo Cantini Parrini | Nominated | |
| Critics' Choice Movie Awards | February 7, 2025 | Best Actress | Angelina Jolie | Nominated | |
| Critics' Choice Movie Awards | February 7, 2025 | Best Costume Design | Massimo Cantini Parrini | Nominated | |
| American Society of Cinematographers Awards | February 23, 2025 | Outstanding Achievement in Cinematography in Theatrical Releases | Edward Lachman | Won | |
| Academy Awards | March 2, 2025 | Best Cinematography | Edward Lachman | Nominated | |

== Works cited ==
- Bender, Abbey (2025). "The Final Outfits". Filmmaker. Vol. 33, no. 2. The Gotham Film & Media Institute.
