= Drew Hancock =

American filmmaker and actor

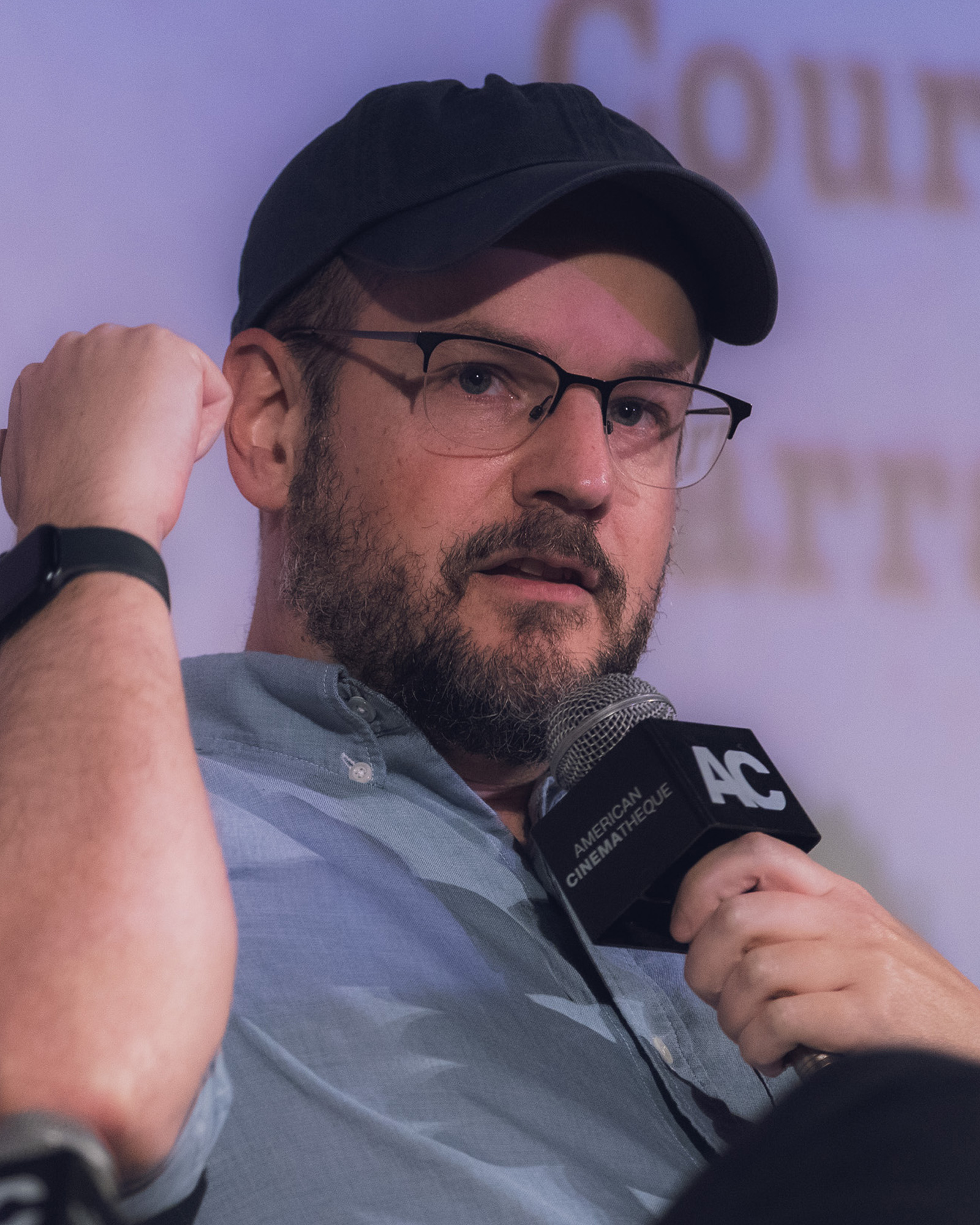
- Hancock in 2025
- Born: July 9, 1979 (age 47); Omaha, Nebraska, U.S.
- Occupations: Writer, director, producer, and actor
- Years active: 2006–present
- Notable work: My Dead Ex; Companion

Drew Hancock (born July 9, 1979) is an American filmmaker and actor. He is best known for writing and directing the science fiction thriller film Companion (2025) and for co-creating the television series My Dead Ex (2018).

== Early life and education ==
Hancock was born in Omaha, Nebraska, and graduated from Westside High School. In 1999, he worked at a movie theater and later moved to Los Angeles to pursue a career in the entertainment industry.

== Career ==
Hancock began his career writing for television, with credits on series such as Blue Mountain State (2010–2011), Suburgatory (2011–2014), Mr. Pickles (2014–2019), and Supah Ninjas (2011). He also wrote the Nickelodeon television film Fred 3: Camp Fred (2012).

In 2018, he co-created the romantic comedy television series My Dead Ex, which premiered at the South by Southwest (SXSW) Film Festival.

Hancock made his feature film directorial debut with Companion (2025), a science fiction thriller film produced by New Line Cinema and BoulderLight Pictures, starring Sophie Thatcher and Jack Quaid. The film premiered to critical acclaim, holding a 93% approval rating on Rotten Tomatoes upon release.

Hancock has also been attached to write a remake of the 1998 science fiction horror film The Faculty and to direct an adaptation of the viral horror story My Wife and I Bought a Ranch for Amazon MGM Studios. The latter was retitled as Seasons and will be his next feature film.

Hancock appeared as a guest on Joe Dante and Josh Olson’s podcast The Movies That Made Me (Season 9, Episode 4) on January 28, 2025, in which he discussed films that influenced him.

== Filmography ==
TV writer

- Blue Mountain State (2010–2011)
- Supah Ninjas (2011)
- Suburgatory (2011–2014)
- Fred: The Show (2012)
- Fred 3: Camp Fred (2012)
- Mr. Pickles (2014–2019)
- My Dead Ex (2018) (Also co-creator)

Film

Year	Title	Director	Writer
2025	Companion	Yes	Yes
2027	Seasons	Yes	Yes

== Awards and nominations ==
- In 2018, My Dead Ex was nominated for the Grand Jury Award in the Independent Episodic category at the South by Southwest Film Festival.
- In January 2025, Drew Hancock was selected by Variety as one of the 10 Directors to Watch at the 36th Palm Springs International Film Festival.
