= Unexpected Dreams – Songs from the Stars =

Compilation album by Various artists
- Released: April 4, 2006
- Genre: Lullaby
- Length: 46:55
- Label: Rhino
- Producer: Wayne Baruch, Charles F. Gayton, and Eric Vetro

Unexpected Dreams – Songs from the Stars is a 2006 compilation album featuring various actors singing lullabies and other songs.

== Album information ==
The album features fourteen various lullabies and songs about dreams, all sung by celebrities not usually known for their singing talent. The album's title has two meanings; first, the songs are all about dreams, and second, it is also the celebrities's "unexpected dreams" to be recording artists.

The music is performed by members of the Los Angeles Philharmonic Orchestra.

== Track listing ==
1. "Summertime" – Scarlett Johansson
2. "The Sweetest Gift"– Ewan McGregor
3. "In My Daughter's Eyes" – Taraji P. Henson
4. "My Heart Is So Full of You" – Jennifer Garner
5. "Make You Feel My Love" – Jeremy Irons
6. "Lullabye (Goodnight, My Angel)" – John Stamos
7. "Little Child" – Lucy Lawless
8. "The Wish Song" – Marissa Jaret Winokur
9. "The Greatest Discovery" – Eric McCormack
10. "No One Is Alone" – Victor Garber
11. "Nightshift" – Julia Louis-Dreyfus
12. "Golden Slumbers" – Nia Vardalos
13. "Lullabye in Ragtime" – John C. Reilly
14. "Good Night" – Teri Hatcher
