= Seasons (2027 film) =

- Directed by: Drew Hancock
- Screenplay by: Drew Hancock
- Based on: Old Country by Matt & Harrison Query
- Produced by: Shawn Levy; Dan Levine; James Wan; Michael Clear; Scott Glassgold; Dan Cohen
- Starring: Lily James; Jack Reynor; Ron Perlman; Elizabeth McGovern; Wes Studi; Dane DiLiegro
- Cinematography: Eli Born
- Production companies: 21 Laps Entertainment; Blumhouse Atomic; 12:01 Films
- Distributed by: Amazon MGM Studios (Note: Released through the Metro-Goldwyn-Mayer banner.)
- Release date: November 12, 2027
- Country: United States
- Language: English

Seasons is an upcoming American supernatural horror film written and directed by Drew Hancock, based on the short story and eventual novel by Matt & Harrison Query. It stars Lily James, Jack Reynor, Ron Perlman, Elizabeth McGovern, Dane DiLiegro, and Wes Studi. Shawn Levy and James Wan serve as producers under their 21 Laps Entertainment and Blumhouse Atomic banners, respectively, alongside 12:01 Films.

The film is scheduled to be released in the United States on November 12, 2027, by Amazon MGM Studios.

== Premise ==
A husband and wife purchase a ranch and later find ancient spirits.

== Cast ==
- Lily James as Sasha Blakemore
- Jack Reynor as Harry Blakemore
- Ron Perlman as Dan Steiner
- Elizabeth McGovern as Lucy Steiner
- Wes Studi
- Dane DiLiegro

== Production ==
The script was originally submitted as My Wife and I Bought a Ranch to Reddit on the horror themed subreddit r/nosleep on February 18, 2020, and later published as Old Country in 2022. After initially going viral, a bidding war ensured for film rights, with Netflix emerging as the winner. The film went into turnaround and was then acquired by Amazon MGM Studios in 2024 with Drew Hancock set to write and direct. Shawn Levy, James Wan, and Scott Glassgold would serve as producers through their 21 Laps Entertainment, Blumhouse Atomic, and 12:01 Films banners, respectively. In June 2026, the film was retitled to Seasons, with Lily James cast. Jack Reynor, Ron Perlman, and Elizabeth McGovern joined the cast in August. In September 2026, Wes Studi and Dane DiLiegro joined the cast.

Principal photography began on August 31, 2026, in Ireland.

== Release ==
Seasons is scheduled to be released in theaters on November 12, 2027, by Amazon MGM Studios.
