= Straight Up (2019 film) =

2019 US film by James Sweeney

- Directed by: James Sweeney
- Written by: James Sweeney
- Produced by: David Carrico; Ross Putman; James Sweeney
- Starring: Katie Findlay; James Sweeney; Dana Drori; James Scully; Tracie Thoms; Betsy Brandt; Randall Park
- Cinematography: Greg Cotten
- Edited by: Keith Funkhouser
- Music by: Logan Nelson
- Distributed by: Strand Releasing
- Release dates: July 23, 2019 (Outfest); February 28, 2020 (United States)
- Running time: 95 minutes
- Country: United States
- Language: English
- Box office: $16,080

Straight Up is a 2019 independent film written, produced, and directed by James Sweeney. Sweeney stars in the film with Katie Findlay, Dana Drori, James Scully, Tracie Thoms, Betsy Brandt, and Randall Park. The film premiered July 23, 2019 at Outfest, with limited distribution by Strand Releasing beginning February 28, 2020.

== Plot ==
Todd, a twenty-something man from Los Angeles with OCD, has difficulty in his romantic relationships as he has a strong aversion to bodily fluids. He likes the men he dates, but aside from an attempt at oral sex, he has never had penetrative sex with them. Eventually he decides to try dating women, and attempts to hook up with a girl after getting drunk with her but freaks out when her hymen breaks. His psychoanalyst wonders if this exploration of sexuality is a good idea, but Todd fears being alone and resolves to continue trying.

He soon meets Rory, a struggling actress who has trouble emotionally connecting with others, in the self-help section of a library. They immediately take a liking to each other, as they both have the same eccentric sense of humor. They later spend hours talking and connecting with each other. Rory quickly moves in with Todd and joins him on his various house-sitting jobs.

Todd's friends oppose his relationship with Rory as they view it as a manifestation of Todd's internalized homophobia, and frequently undermine the validity of their relationship. Rory agrees to pursue a romantic relationship with him—though sex is off the table. After Todd introduces Rory to his parents, he worries that they might like him more because he's now dating a woman.

At an awkward Christmas party with Todd's friends where they play truth or dare, Rory walks in on Todd in a compromising position with his gay friend and leaves. Rory becomes increasingly unhappy with her life in L.A., and decides to move to Seattle. During their break up conversation, Rory says she may want kids (they had previously agreed neither wanted children) and Todd goes into a panic attack.

Some time later Rory has an established office job in Seattle, but still has problems connecting with her coworkers. Todd refuses to date anyone since Rory left. One of Rory's coworkers takes an interest in her, but she realizes they are too different. She calls Todd but hangs up before he can pick up. When she leaves work at the end of the day she finds Todd waiting for her. In an attempt at a grand romantic gesture, Todd proposes, but Rory declines. Todd makes an impassioned plea to her, tells her he loves her, and does not want to be with anyone else.

While Todd and Rory chat over a tile game, another man sits between them to join the conversation, with an intimacy apparently evolving among the trio.

== Cast ==
- Katie Findlay as Rory
- James Sweeney as Todd
- Dana Drori as Meg
- James Scully as Ryder
- Tracie Thoms as Dr. Larson
- Betsy Brandt as Topanga, Todd's mother and Wallace's wife
- Randall Park as Wallace, Todd's father and Topanga's husband

== Production ==
=== Development ===
Straight Up was partly funded through a crowdfunding campaign on Seed&Spark which raised $23,340 for production. Sweeney based the film on his proof of concept short Normal Doors which was created for Fox Digital Studios.

In an interview with The Desert Sun, Sweeney said:

If you think it’s not a love story, maybe the film should challenge what the idea of love is. Even the idea of romantic love, because there’s more than one type of love, but specifically the idea of romantic love is a relatively modern concept and especially the western notion of what that love is, is part of what inspired the concept of the film. [...] Here are these two people, Todd and Rory, who click each other’s boxes in so many ways except for this big box known as sex. Can you not love somebody because you don’t have sex with them? I’m not trying to answer that question for all people or make a statement of what love is, because that’s not for me to say. Everybody has their own relationship with love.

=== Filming ===
Principal photography took place over 18 days in 20 different locations with two additional days of pick up. The film was shot in a 4:3 aspect ratio. On the aspect ratio, Sweeney said "in a lot of ways Todd and Rory are living in a box, and you could argue that some of their relationship is taken out of a 1930s Hays Code–era movie plot, which is when that ratio was standard. They conform to the modern ideal but don’t fit, and feel boxed in by that. Thematically that’s where it lands, but it also lends itself aesthetically to a lot of the composition and symmetry we were trying to showcase".

== Release ==
The film had its world premiere at the 2019 Outfest on July 23, 2019. It was also show at the NewFest on October 26, 2019. In August 2019, Strand Releasing acquired U.S distribution rights. The film was released in a limited release on February 28, 2020. The film was also released in the United Kingdom in March 2020. In April and May 2020, due to the closure of cinemas during the COVID-19 pandemic, Strand Releasing partnered with various arthouse exhibitors to screen the film in virtual cinemas.

== Reception ==
On Rotten Tomatoes, the film holds an approval rating of 93% based on 28 reviews, with an average of 7/10. The website's critical consensus reads, "Well-acted and sharply written, Straight Up serves as an effervescent calling card for writer/director/star James Sweeney." On Metacritic, the film has a weighted average score of 66 out of 100, based on 12 critics, indicating "generally favorable reviews".

Straight Up was the Breakthrough Centerpiece at the 2019 Outfest and won the Grand Jury Award at the 2019 San Diego Asian Film Festival.

David Lewis, for the San Francisco Chronicle, highlighted Sweeney's directorial debut as "impressive" and wrote that "on the surface, Sweeney’s film is a playful examination of sexual fluidity, but underneath the gags, it’s really a universal, sweet movie about the modern complexities of finding a soulmate. It’s also a nice example of how independent films can breathe fresh air into genres like the romantic comedy".

Keith Uhlich of The Hollywood Reporter wrote: "Both Sweeney and Findlay are more than up to the task of playing arrested millennials dancing around their problems, forever walking a fine line between charm and aggravation. And Sweeney as filmmaker effectively goes the Wes Anderson route of letting emotion bust through all the aesthetic archness at key moments. [...] We often make our own psychological prisons, and Straight Up is a droll embodiment of its protagonist's (and perhaps its maker's?) inner turmoil. Todd's sexual proclivities aren't fully on one side or the other of the Kinsey scale. Maybe he has none at all (that's fine, too!)".

Carlos Aguilar, for TheWrap, wrote: "Lack of intimacy, both physical and emotional, is at the heart of Todd’s current crisis. Unfulfilled with same-sex romance, he wonders whether a foray into straight dating could unblock the door to self-discovery and prevent him from spending the rest of his days alone (as he exaggeratedly puts it). [...] True to the unlabeled happiness Todd is after, 'Straight Up' doesn't conclude by assigning a new concrete definition of what these sexless sweethearts understand as being in love, regardless of the mechanics of their commitment. Sweeney's movie lets it flow with all its moving parts and uncertain specificities, focusing only on their spiritually solid bond".

Owen Gleiberman, for Variety, wrote that the film "is really about a generation of people who have discovered a new way to connect through their detachment. A little of this can go a long way (the film is sometimes a bit airless), but James Sweeney is a filmmaker with the rare ability to toss antically inspired dialogue right off the edge of his brain. 'Straight Up' is the work of a startling talent".

Black Girl Nerds gave the film a 4.5/5 rating and Donnie Lopez wrote: "In Straight Up, the two characters fall for one another’s intellect. [...] But just like any rom-com, no good thing can last without there being some kind of complications to their unique coupling. This struggle is brought on by a modern understanding of a relationship—one that is not often covered in people’s everyday lives. This film gives way to the underappreciated and overlooked forms of sexuality. [...] Too often the narratives that circle gay and queer stories are about physical mating, yet queer people are more complex than that. This film explores a different kind of gay narrative, one that opens discussion up to a different perspective. [...] The film Straight Up gives you a sense of love from a different perspective. No jabs, no punches, just a real-life interpretation of what two people in love with each other's mind would look like—just a lot of heart".
