= Eric Vetro =

American vocal coach and voice teacher

- Born: Gloversville, New York
- Education: New York University (BA and MA)
- Occupations: Vocal coach, voice teacher
- Years active: 1980-present
- Website: ericvetro.com

Eric Vetro is an American vocal coach and voice teacher. Described as the "voice whisperer," he has taught Grammy, Tony, Emmy and Oscar award-winning recording artists and actors.

Vetro's voice students include Ariana Grande, Sabrina Carpenter, Camila Cabello, John Legend, Shawn Mendes, Katy Perry, Pink, Charlie Puth, Rosalía, and Lea Michele. He has worked with actors on more than 40 movie musicals, including Jonathan Bailey (as Fiyero in Wicked); Austin Butler (as Elvis Presley in Elvis); Timothée Chalamet (in preparation for his roles as Bob Dylan in A Complete Unknown and Willy Wonka in Wonka); Angelina Jolie (as Maria Callas in Maria) ; Jeremy Allen White (as Bruce Springsteen in Deliver Me from Nowhere), and Renée Zellweger (as Judy Garland in Judy).

== Early life and education ==
Vetro was born to Ernestine and Frank Vetro. His father was a lawyer. He was raised in Gloversville, New York, where he went to movie musicals with his grandmother and cousin. He showed interest in music at a young age, and watched The Tonight Show Starring Johnny Carson and The Ed Sullivan Show religiously to see the singers of the day. As a child he fantasized about what it would be like to give voice lessons to Judy Garland and Elvis Presley. He began playing the piano at 5. His father, an amateur pianist, was his first teacher.

He was frequently recruited to play the piano in elementary, middle, and high school. In second grade, he gave "singing lessons" to his cousin Debbie. ("She was singing 'Jingle Bells' wrong, and I kept drilling her, 'No, it's like this.' I made her sing it over and over and over, and she finally got it right.") He came to the realization that that he could teach singing after he helped an athletic and popular classmate sing a song for a fifth-grade class skit; despite their differences. In high school Vetro played the piano for the school musicals, and, at the request of his teachers, taught and rehearsed cast members. In a 2024 interview with Vanity Fair, he said teaching gave him the strong identity he lacked growing up: "Oh, this is what I do. I play the piano. I'm good at helping people learn songs." In 2024, he created a scholarship program at Gloversville High to provide financial support and raise the confidence of students interested in the arts in honor of the Gloversville High teachers who supported him.

Vetro earned a BA and a master's in music education from New York University, While at NYU, in addition to teaching privately, he played piano for several voice teachers. By the time he was 25 he had observed lessons given by 20 different teachers, learning that as a teacher "one size does not fit all."

== Career ==
=== Early career: Musical theater, first credits, Ariana Grande ===
Vetro remained in New York after completing his master's. Good word of mouth led to a year-long tour with cabaret singer Samantha Samuels. He moved to Los Angeles when the tour ended. In the 1980s he began teaching cast members of the touring companies of musicals including Les Misérables and The Phantom of the Opera. In the 1990s, among others, he coached Tony-nominated Broadway performers including Susan Egan (Beauty and the Beast) and Craig Bierko (The Music Man).

In 1999, producers Craig Zadan and Neil Meron hired him in to work with Kathy Bates and Victor Garber for the 1999 ABC remake of Annie. At the same time, he coached Julia Louis-Dreyfus and Drew Carey for the film Geppetto, which also aired on ABC. He went on to work with Zadan and Meron on musicals including Hairspray, Hairspray Live!, Chicago, and the three consecutive Academy Awards ceremonies they produced. He credited Meron and Zadan for jumpstarting his career as "Hollywood’s go-to musical mentor."

During the 2000s, Vetro coached and prepared actors for starring roles in Broadway musicals. Among others, he worked with John Stamos (Nine); Allison Janney and Megan Hilty (9 to 5); Matthew Morrison (The Light in the Piazza); and Shirley Jones (42nd Street) as well as Tony nominees Malcolm Gets (Amour), and Alfred Molina (Fiddler on the Roof) and Tony winners Marissa Jaret Winokur (Hairspray), John Larroquette (How to Succeed in Business Without Really Trying), and Hugh Jackman (The Boy from Oz).

Although Vetro continued to work on film and television projects in the 2000s—he served as the vocal coach for both seasons of Watching Ellie, a TV series that starred Julia Louis-Dreyfus, and coached Nia Vardalos for the film Connie and Carla—his students were largely recording artists. Among others, he coached Katy Perry, Meat Loaf, John Rzeznik (Goo Goo Dolls), Rivers Cuomo(Weezer), and Bette Midler, with whom he collaborated for almost 15 years. In 2004, he served as the vocal coach for the Academy Awards, coaching host Billy Crystal, who opened the broadcast with a song and dance medley. During the same time period, he met Diane Warren—a 16-time Oscar nominee—who became a close friend.

In 2006, he co-produced the compilation album Unexpected Dreams – Songs from the Stars. The vocalists on its 14 tracks included actors Jennifer Garner, Taraji P. Henson, Jeremy Irons, Scarlett Johansson, Ewan McGregor, and John Stamos. The music was performed by members of the Los Angeles Philharmonic. Vetro wrote two of the songs on the album.

Vetro began working with Grande when she was a young teenager. Because she then lived in Boca Raton, Florida, their first lessons were via Skype. Vetro said he knew she was a star before he heard her sing. His focus with Grande—who could "fall out of bed and hit a high C"—was on teaching her healthy vocal techniques that would protect her voice for the duration of her career. Grande name checked Vetro in her 2019 song with Victoria Monét, "Monopoly." ("I never track my vocals so shout out to Eric Vetro -- I love Eric Vetro, man.")

=== 2010-2019: Katy Perry, Emily Blunt, Sabrina Carpenter, La La Land ===
In 2010, he traveled between LA and New York to work with Sean Hayes and Kristin Chenoweth for the Broadway musical, Promises, Promises. He coached Katy Perry for her Prismatic and California Dreams Tours, and worked with her for her appearance at the Super Bowl XLIX halftime show and on her concert films. To keep her voice healthy, he advised her to sleep for 8 to 9 hours a night and avoid caffeine, alcohol, and dairy. She referred to him as her "vocal life coach." In 2011, he began working with Sabrina Carpenter, who was then 12. His focus with Carpenter, as with Grande, was on keeping her voice healthy.

In 2012 and 2014, Vetro served as the vocal coach for the Academy Awards.

Emily Blunt and Vetro met in 2013 at the suggestion of director Rob Marshall, who approached Blunt to appear in his filmed adaptation of Stephen Sondheim's musical Into the Woods. Lacking confidence in her ability to sing, she asked Vetro to tell Marshall that there was no way she could sing Sondheim. Vetro instead convinced her to audition. Her performance in the film was praised by critics, as was her performance in the 2018 musical comedy Mary Poppins Returns. He also coached Chris Pine and Anna Kendrick for Into the Woods, and Halle Bailey and Melissa McCarthy for Marshall's film The Little Mermaid.

Among other projects in the mid and late 2010s, Vetro was the vocal coach for Nina (which starred Zoe Saldaña as Nina Simone), the animated features Sing, Sing 2, and Beauty and the Beast, and the live television special The Little Mermaid Live!. He worked with Ryan Gosling and Emma Stone for La La Land, keeping Stone "match fit amidst the competing demands of a physically exhausting choreography schedule and a couple of ill-timed head-colds." Stone won the 2017 Academy award for best actress for La La Land. Gosling was nominated for best actor. He worked with Renée Zellweger for almost a year at the end of the decade to help her prepare for her role in the 2019 Judy Garland biopic, Judy. She won the Academy Award for best actress for her portrayal of Garland.

=== 2020 - present: A Complete Unknown, Wicked, Austin Butler, Angelina Jolie, Jeremy Allen White ===
Vetro coached students via FaceTime, Zoom and other digital platforms during the COVID-19 pandemic. Several of the projects he was working on, including Daisy Jones & the Six—he was coaching co-stars Riley Keough and Sam Claflin—paused production when the pandemic began.

Vetro worked with Austin Butler both on his audition and preproduction preparation for his role as Elvis Presley in Elvis. Butler was praised for his performance in the film, which was released in June 2022. In the LA Times, reviewer Katie Walsh wrote: "Butler is jaw-dropping, nearly feral in his portrayal of Presley’s most memorable musical performances, from his early days to his 1968 comeback special."

In addition to working with Grande, Vetro coached Jonathan Bailey for Wicked. He mainly coached Bailey via FaceTime, as Bailey was frequently working in London and Toronto. He and Grande worked together daily for three months prior to her audition and months before filming to find and strengthen the operatic facet of her voice. Grande had been a student of Vetro's for approximately 17 years when the film was released; he said he sobbed all the way through Wicked the first time he saw it. In 2024 Grande was nominated for an Academy Award. Bailey was nominated for a SAG Award.

In 2022, Vetro worked with Angelina Jolie, who was terrified of singing when she was cast as Maria Callas in Maria. When Vetro tried to get her to sing at her first lesson, she cried. He worked with her for more than seven months to overcome her fear.

To train Jolie, he enlisted the help of several professional opera singers, one of whom focused on Jolie's Italian diction, and two who could demonstrate the high notes he was unable to reach. Although her voice would be blended with archival recordings of Callas, she learned every note, every lyric, and every aria. Jolie said: “Eric helped me to find my voice...I had never done the kind of work we did over seven months. He explains and is patient, but he is very serious about music. His passion is contagious.” In a review of Maria in The New Yorker, Jeffrey Brody wrote: "Her musical scenes are as impressive as they are audacious, and Jolie conveys in them the intense physicality that the craft demands." Vetro credited Jolie's success to her dedication; he said she rose to the occasion.

Although Timothee Chalamet was cast as Bob Dylan for the Dylan biopic A Complete Unknown in 2018, production was delayed by the pandemic and the writer's strike. By the time Vetro started to coach Chalamet for Dylan, they had already worked together on the musical Wonka, in which Chalamet played the title role.

To portray Dylan, Vetro first had Chalamet find his natural voice, an element central to Vetro's goal of "finding the essence of the person they are portraying – inhabiting them – and bringing that alive without imitation." Chalamet used a series of vocal exercises to sound like Dylan in his 20s, Dylan's age in the film, and studied Dylan's live performances and interviews to capture Dylan's tone, style, delivery, posture, personality and pronunciation. After several months, with the intention of using pre-recorded tracks for the film—the general practice for movies—Chalamet recorded the songs in a studio. Ultimately, the recorded music was used only for the soundtrack album as he performed the songs live for the film.

Vetro also coached Monica Barbaro, who played Joan Baez in A Complete Unknown, teaching her to sing in Baez's range. Barbaro also sang live in the film. She was nominated for an Academy Award for best supporting actress. Chalamet was nominated for best actor. He began coaching Jeremy Allen White for his role as Bruce Springsteen in Deliver Me from Nowhere, a film about the making of Springsteen's album Nebraska, in 2024.

Vetro's earned significant media attention in 2024 and 2025. He was described as "the spiritual guru to Hollywood's biggest stars," (Los Angeles Times); "Hollywood's not-so-secret weapon" (Vanity Fair); "the voice whisperer" (Vulture) and the "go-to vocal coach" (The New York Times). In addition to the LA Times, Vulture, the New York Times, Vanity Fair, and other publications, he was profiled in GQ, The Wall Street Journal, The Telegraph, People, The Hollywood Reporter, Variety, Entertainment Weekly, and Spin.

In 2025, Sabrina Carpenter was nominated for six Grammys, including album, song, and record of the year, and five actors he coached were nominated for Oscar awards.

== Backstage Pass with Eric Vetro, BBC Maestro ==
Vetro launched the podcast Backstage Pass with Eric Vetro in 2021. The debut episode featured Grande. The Guardian wrote that with guests including John Legend, Shawn Mendes, and Camila Cabello, Vetro "entertainingly lifts the curtain on their craft, talking to them about their journey in a manner that feels genuinely intimate given their pre-existing relationships." The podcast aired from June 2021 through June 2022.

Vetro's BBC Maestro Sing Like The Stars Masterclass premiered in late 2024. He was approached by the BBC Maestro team and agreed to participate when he learned that Mark Ronson, Sir Tim Rice, and Bill Lawence were among previous BBC Masterclass teachers. Interested in bringing his expertise to an audience that did not have access to voice lessons, his eight hour, 29-lesson Master Class featured appearances from several of his students, including Carpenter, Legend, and Winokur.
