= 36th Palm Springs International Film Festival =

2025 film festival

- Official poster
- Opening film: Better Man
- Closing film: The Penguin Lessons
- Location: Palm Springs, California, United States
- Awards: Best International Film: I’m Still Here
- Festival date: January 2–13, 2025

Palm Springs International Film Festival
- 2026 2024

The 36th Palm Springs International Film Festival took place from January 2 to 13, 2025, in Palm Springs, California, United States. The festival opened with Michael Gracey's biographic drama film Better Man and closed with Peter Cattaneo's comedy drama film The Penguin Lessons.

== Background and special awards ==
The full lineup was revealed on November 26, 2024. Among the sections, a Spanish Focus section took place, dedicated to highlight Spanish cinema, while Spanish filmmaker Pedro Almodóvar received a spotlight section screening some films from his filmography.

As usual, throughout late 2024, several special awards were announced, which were presented during the Opening Gala on January 3, 2024, at the Palm Springs Convention Center. Jacques Audiard's musical crime comedy Emilia Pérez received the Vanguard Award. The Desert Palm Achievement for Best Actor and Best Actress went to Adrien Brody and Angelina Jolie for their performances in The Brutalist and Maria, respectively. Mikey Madison and Kieran Culkin both won the Breakthrough Performance Award, for Anora and A Real Pain respectively. Australian actress Nicole Kidman won the International Star Award for Babygirl. The Spotlight Award went to Colman Domingo for Sing Sing. Mystery thriller Conclave received the Ensemble Performance Award. Its cast includes Ralph Fiennes, Isabella Rossellini, Stanley Tucci, John Lithgow and Lucian Msamati. American actor Timothée Chalamet received the Chairman's Award for A Complete Unknown while American singer and actress Ariana Grande was honored with the Rising Star Award for her performance in Wicked. Finally, the Visionary Award was presented to Canadian filmmaker Denis Villeneuve for Dune: Part Two.

The following day, on January 4, the Variety's 10 Directors to Watch & Creative Impact Awards brunch took place at the Parker Palm Springs. The recipients for the Creative Impact awards are Cynthia Erivo, who received the Acting Award, and Jacques Audiard, who was honored with the Directing Award. Additionally, American singer and actress Jennifer López was presented with the Legend & Groundbreaker Award.

== Sections ==
The films selected for each section are as follows:

=== Awards Buzz – Best International Feature Film Submissions ===
The following section consists of submissions for Best International Feature Film at the 97th Academy Awards:

English title	Original title	Director(s)	Submission countrie(s)
Armand		Halfdan Ullmann Tøndel	Norway
Come Closer	קרוב אלי	Tom Nesher	Israel
Dahomey		Mati Diop	Senegal
Drowning Dry	Sesės	Laurynas Bareiša	Lithuania
Emilia Pérez		Jacques Audiard	France
Everybody Loves Touda	الجميع يحب تودة	Nabil Ayouch	Morocco
Flow	Straume	Gints Zilbalodis	Latvia
From Ground Zero	قصص غير محكية من غزة من المسافة صفر	Multiple directors (Note: Directed by Aws Al-Banna, Ahmed Al-Danf, Basil Al-Maqousi, Mustafa Al-Nabih, Muhammad Alshareef, Ala Ayob, Bashar Al Balbisi, Alaa Damo, Awad Hana, Ahmad Hassunah, Mustafa Kallab, Satoum Kareem, Mahdi Karera, Rabab Khamees, Khamees Masharawi, Wissam Moussa, Tamer Najm, Abu Hasna Nidaa, Damo Nidal, Mahmoud Reema, Etimad Weshah and Islam Al Zrieai.)	Palestine
The Girl with the Needle	Pigen med nålen	Magnus von Horn	Denmark
Grand Tour		Miguel Gomes	Portugal
How to Make Millions Before Grandma Dies	หลานม่า	Pat Boonnitipat	Thailand
The Hungarian Dressmaker	Ema a smrtihlav	Iveta Grófová	Slovakia
I'm Still Here	Ainda Estou Aqui	Walter Salles	Brazil
Julie Keeps Quiet	Julie zwijgt	Leonardo Van Dijl	Belgium
Kill the Jockey	El jockey	Luis Ortega	Argentina
Kneecap		Rich Peppiatt	Ireland
La Suprema		Felipe Holguin	Colombia
The Last Journey	Den sista resan	Filip Hammar and Fredrik Wikingsson	Sweden
Life	Hayat	Zeki Demirkubuz	Turkey
Lost Ladies	लापता लेडीज़	Kiran Rao	India
Meeting with Pol Pot	Rendez-vous avec Pol Pot	Rithy Panh	Cambodia
Memories of a Burning Body	Memorias de un cuerpo que arde	Antonella Sudasassi	Costa Rica
My Late Summer	Nakon ljeta	Danis Tanović	Bosnia and Herzegovina
Old Fox	老狐狸	Hsiao Ya-chuan	Taiwan
Santosh		Sandhya Suri	United Kingdom
Saturn Return	Segundo premio	Isaki Lacuesta and Pol Rodríguez	Spain
The Seed of the Sacred Fig	دانه‌ی انجیر معابد	Mohammad Rasoulof	Germany
Shambhala	शम्भाला	Min Bahadur Bham	Nepal
Sujo		Astrid Rondero and Fernanda Valadez	Mexico
Three Kilometres to the End of the World	Trei kilometri pâna la capatul lumii	Emanuel Pârvu	Romania
Touch	Snerting	Baltasar Kormákur	Iceland
Twilight of the Warriors: Walled In	九龍城寨之圍城	Soi Cheang	Hong Kong
Universal Language	Une langue universelle	Matthew Rankin	Canada
Vermiglio		Maura Delpero	Italy
Waves	Vlny	Jiří Mádl	Czech Republic

Highlighted title indicates the section winner.

=== True Stories ===
The following films were selected to be screened as part of the True Stories section:

English title	Original title	Director(s)	Production countrie(s)
Adrianne and the Castle		Shannon Walsh	Canada
Agent of Happiness		Arun Bhattarai, Dorottya Zurbó	Bhutan, Hungary
Apocalypse in the Tropics	Apocalipse nos Trópicos	Petra Costa	Brazil
Billy Preston: That's The Way God Planned It		Paris Barclay	United States
Blue Road – The Edna O'Brien Story		Sinéad O'Shea	Ireland, United Kingdom
Bring Them Home		Ivan Macdonald, Ivy Macdonald, Daniel Glick	United States
Checkpoint Zoo		Joshua Zeman	United States, Ukraine
Counted Out		Vicki Abeles	United States
Desert Angel		Vincent Deluca	United States
The Diamond King		Marq Evans	United States
Diane Warren: Relentless		Bess Kargman	United States
Driver		Nesa Azimi	United States
Every Little Thing		Sally Aitken	Australia
Good Men		Bobby Roth	United States
Group Therapy		Neil Berkeley	United States
Headhunting to Beatboxing		Rohit Gupta	India
His Own Way – The Cinema of Avi Nesher		Yair Raveh	Israel
Homegrown		Michael Premo	United States
Igualada		Juan Mejía	Colombia, Mexico, United States
Janis Ian: Breaking Silence		Varda Bar-Kar	United States
Jean Cocteau		Lisa Immordino Vreeland	United States
Liza: A Truly Terrific Absolutely True Story		Bruce David Klein	United States
Mistress Dispeller		Elizabeth Lo	China, United States
My Sweet Land		Sareen Hairabedian	Jordan, United States, France, Ireland
Nasty		Tudor Giurgiu, Tudor D. Popescu, Cristian Pascariu	Romania
No Other Land		Yuval Abraham, Basel Adra, Hamdan Ballal, Rachel Szor	Palestine
Paul Anka: His Way		John Maggio	United States
Sabbath Queen		Sandi Simcha DuBowski	United States
Schindler Space Architect		Valentina Ganeva	United States
Shelf Life		Ian Cheney	United States, Japan, Switzerland, Georgia, Egypt, Spain, United Kingdom
Space Cowboy		Marah Strauch, Bryce Leavitt	United States
The Stamp Thief		Dan Sturman	United States, Poland, Germany
A Sudden Glimpse to Deeper Things		Mark Cousins	United Kingdom
Tokito: The 540-Day Journey of A Culinary Maverick	革新の料理人たち 540日の記録	Aki Mizutani	Japan
Transfers	Traslados	Nicolás Gil Lavedra	Argentina, Uruguay
Walk with Me		Heidi Levitt	United States
Whatever It Takes		Jenny Carchman	United Kingdom, United States
You're No Indian		Ryan Flynn	United States
Zurawski v. Texas		Maisie Crow, Abbie Perrault	United States

=== Modern Masters ===
The following films were selected to be screened as part of the Modern Masters section, consisting of new films by well-established directors:

English title	Original title	Director(s)	Production countrie(s)
Hard Truths		Mike Leigh	United Kingdom, Spain
Never Alone	Ei koskaan yksin	Klaus Härö	Estonia, Finland
Parthenope		Paolo Sorrentino	Italy
Presence		Steven Soderbergh	United States
A Traveler's Needs	여행자의 필요	Hong Sang-soo	South Korea
When Fall Is Coming	Quand vient l'automne	François Ozon	France

=== New Voices New Visions ===
The following films were selected to be screened as part of the New Voices New Visions competition:

English title	Original title	Director(s)	Production countrie(s)
Bob Trevino Likes It		Tracie Laymon	United States
Bonjour Tristesse		Durga Chew-Bose	Canada, Germany
Color Book		David Fortune	United States
Don't Let's Go to the Dogs Tonight		Embeth Davidtz	South Africa
Hanami		Denise Fernandes	Switzerland, Portugal, Cape Verde
The New Year That Never Came	Anul Nou care n-a fost	Bogdan Mureșanu	Romania
To a Land Unknown		Mahdi Fleifel	United Kingdom, Palestine, France, Greece, Netherlands, Germany, Qatar, Saudi Arabia

Highlighted title indicates the section winner.

=== American Indies ===
The following films were selected to be screened as part of the American Indies section:

English title	Original title	Director(s)	Production countrie(s)
Bad Shabbos		Daniel Robbins	United States
The Friend		Scott McGehee and David Siegel	United States
I Don't Understand You		David Joseph Craig, Brian Crano	United States, Italy
Lilly		Rachel Feldman	United States
Love Me		Sam Zuchero and Andy Zuchero	United States
Millers in Marriage		Edward Burns	United States
Paper Flowers		Mahesh Pailoor	United States
Sacramento		Michael Angarano	United States

=== Talking Pictures ===
The following films were selected to be screened as part of the Talking Pictures section, each with discussion panels with their directors, writers and actors:

English title	Original title	Director(s)	Production countrie(s)
Babygirl (Note: Conversation with actress Nicole Kidman.)		Halina Reijn	United States
Emilia Pérez (Note: Conversation with director Jacques Audiard and actors Zoe Saldaña, Karla Sofía Gascón, Selena Gomez, and Edgar Ramírez.)		Jacques Audiard	France
Maria (Note: Conversation with actress Angelina Jolie.)		Pablo Larraín	Italy, Germany, United States
A Real Pain (Note: Conversation with writer-director and actor Jesse Eisenberg.)		Jesse Eisenberg	Poland, United States
Sing Sing (Note: Conversation with actor Colman Domingo.)		Greg Kwedar	United States
Wicked (Note: Extended introduction with director Jon M. Chu and actresses Cynthia Erivo and Ariana Grande.)		Jon M. Chu	United States

=== Spanish Focus ===
The following films were selected to be screened as part of the Spanish Focus section, dedicated to celebrate Spanish cinema:

English title	Original title	Director(s)	Production countrie(s)
Afternoons of Solitude	Tardes de soledad	Albert Serra	Spain, France, Portugal
The Exiles	Los Tortuga	Belén Funes	Spain, Chile
Holy Mother	La abadesa	Antonio Chavarrías	Spain, Belgium
I'm Nevenka	Soy Nevenka	Icíar Bollaín	Spain, Italy
Marco, the Invented Truth	Marco, la verdad inventada	Aitor Arregi and Jon Garaño	Spain
Rioja, The Land of a Thousand Wines	Rioja, la tierra de los mil vinos	José Luis López-Linares	Spain
The Wailing	El llanto	Pedro Martín-Calero	Spain, France, Argentina

=== Queer Cinema Today & The Gayla ===
The following films were selected to be screened as part of the Queer Cinema Today section and The Gayla:

English title	Original title	Director(s)	Production countrie(s)
Bun Tikki		Faraz Arif Ansari	India
Desired Lines		Jules Rosskam	United States
Drive Back Home		Michael Clowater	Canada
Four Mothers		Darren Thornton	Ireland, United Kingdom
A House Is Not a Disco		Brian J. Smith	United States
I'm Your Venus		Kimberly Reed	United States
Misericordia	Miséricorde	Alain Guiraudie	France, Spain, Portugal
A Nice Indian Boy		Roshan Sethi	United States, Canada
Sally!		Deborah Craig, Jörg Fockele, Ondine Rarey	United States

=== Spotlight: Pedro Almodóvar ===
The following films were selected to be screened as part of a section destined to highlight Spanish director Pedro Almodóvar's filmography:

English title	Original title	Director(s)	Production countrie(s)
All About My Mother (1999)	Todo sobre mi madre	Pedro Almodóvar	Spain, France
Matador (1986)		Pedro Almodóvar	Spain
The Room Next Door		Pedro Almodóvar	Spain
Talk to Her (2002)	Hable con ella	Pedro Almodóvar	Spain

=== Family Day ===
The following films were selected to be screened as part of the Family Day section:

English title	Original title	Director(s)	Production countrie(s)
The Day the Earth Blew Up: A Looney Tunes Movie		Pete Browngardt	United States
Flow	Straume	Gints Zilbalodis	Latvia, France, Belgium
The Mountain		Rachel House	New Zealand

=== World Cinema Now ===
The following films were selected to be screened as part of the World Cinema Now section:

English title	Original title	Director(s)	Production countrie(s)
Arcadia		Yorgos Zois	Greece, Bulgaria, United States
Auction	Le tableau volé	Pascal Bonitzer	France
Audrey		Natalie Bailey	Australia
Black Dog	狗阵	Guan Hu	China
Bushido		Kazuya Shiraishi	Japan
The Correspondent		Kriv Stenders	Australia
From Hilde, with Love	In Liebe, Eure Hilde	Andreas Dresen	Germany
Ghost Trail	Les Fantômes	Jonathan Millet	France, Germany, Belgium
Happy Holidays	ينعاد عليكو	Scandar Copti	Palestine, Germany, France, Italy, Qatar
John Cranko		Joachim Lang	Germany
Maldoror		Fabrice du Welz	Belgium, France
Manas		Marianna Brennand	Brazil, Portugal
My Favourite Cake	کیک محبوب من	Maryam Moghaddam, Behtash Sanaeeha	Iran, France, Sweden, Germany
Odd Fish	Ljósvíkingar	Snævar Sölvi Sölvason	Iceland, Finland, Czech Republic
On Becoming a Guinea Fowl		Rungano Nyoni	Zambia, United Kingdom, Ireland
Pink Lady		Nir Bergman	Israel, Italy
The Quiet Ones	De lydløse	Frederik Louis Hviid	Denmark, United States
Quisling: The Final Days	Quislings siste dager	Erik Poppe	Norway
Sex		Dag Johan Haugerud	Norway, United States
The Shameless		Konstantin Bojanov	Switzerland, France, Bulgaria, Taiwan, India
Sons	Vogter	Gustav Möller	Denmark, Sweden
Souleymane's Story	L'Histoire de Souleymane	Boris Lojkine	France
Sunshine		Antoinette Jadaone	Philippines
Superboys of Malegaon		Reema Kagti	India, United States
Tatami		Zar Amir Ebrahimi, Guy Nattiv	Georgia, Israel, Iran
There's Still Tomorrow	C'è ancora domani	Paola Cortellesi	Italy, United States
Through Rocks and Clouds	Raíz	Franco García Becerra	Peru, Chile
Tinā (Mother)		Miki Magasiva	New Zealand
To Kill a Mongolian Horse	一匹白马的热梦	Jiang Xiaoxuan	Malaysia, Hong Kong, South Korea, Japan, United States
Trifole		Gabriele Fabbro	Italy, South Africa, United States
Waltzing with Brando		Bill Fishman	United States, French Polynesia
The Way, My Way		Bill Bennett	Australia
William Tell		Nick Hamm	United Kingdom

=== Talking Pictures: Book to Screen ===
The following films were selected to be screened as part of the Talking Pictures: Book to Screen:

English title	Original title	Director(s)	Production countrie(s)
Conclave (Note: Written by Peter Straughan; based on the 2016 novel by Robert Harris.)		Edward Berger	United Kingdom, United States
Nickel Boys (Note: Written by RaMell Ross and Joslyn Barnes; based on the 2019 novel The Nickel Boys by Colson Whitehead.)		RaMell Ross	United States
Queer (Note: Written by Justin Kuritzkes; based on the 1985 novella by William S. Burroughs.)		Luca Guadagnino	Italy, United States
Reading Lolita in Tehran (Note: Written by Marjorie David; based on the 2003 book by Azar Nafisi.)		Eran Riklis	Italy, Israel
The Room Next Door (Note: Written by Pedro Almodóvar; based on the 2020 novel What Are You Going Through by Sigrid Nunez.)		Pedro Almodóvar	Spain

== Awards ==
The following awards were presented at the 36th Edition:

=== International Film competition ===
- Best International Feature Film: I'm Still Here by Walter Salles
- Best Actor in an International Feature Film: Mo Chara, Móglaí Bap, and DJ Provái for Kneecap
- Best Actress in an International Feature Film: Zoe Saldaña for Emilia Pérez
- Best International Screenplay: Maura Delpero for Vermiglio

=== Ibero-American Competition ===
- Ibero-American Award: Sujo by Astrid Rondero and Fernanda Valadez
- Ibero-American Special Mention: Manas by Marianna Brennand

=== Documentary competition ===
- Best Documentary: No Other Land by Yuval Abraham, Basel Adra, Hamdan Ballal, Rachel Szor
- Special Mention: Blue Road – The Edna O'Brien Story by Sinéad O'Shea

=== New Voices New Visions ===
- New Voices New Visions Award: The New Year That Never Came by Bogdan Mureșanu
- New Voices New Visions Special Mention: Don't Let's Go to the Dogs Tonight by Embeth Davidtz

=== Other awards ===
- Desert Views Award: Checkpoint Zoo by Joshua Zeman
  - Desert Views Special Mention: Desert Angel by Vincent DeLuca
- Young Cineastes Award: Tatami by Guy Nattiv and Zar Amir Ebrahimi
  - Young Cineastes Special Mention: Superboys of Malegaon by Reema Kagti
- Bridging the Borders Award: Souleymane's Story by Boris Lojkine
  - Bridging the Borders Special Mention: Happy Holidays by Scandar Copti

=== Opening Gala Awards ===
The following awards were presented during the opening gala:

- Vanguard Award: Emilia Pérez (Jacques Audiard, Karla Sofía Gascón, Zoe Saldaña, Selena Gómez, Edgar Ramírez)
- Desert Palm Achievement for Best Actor: Adrien Brody for The Brutalist
- Desert Palm Achievement for Best Actress: Angelina Jolie for Maria
- Spotlight Award: Colman Domingo for Sing Sing
- Breakthrough Performance Award: Mikey Madison for Anora
- Breakthrough Performance Award: Kieran Culkin for A Real Pain
- International Star Award: Nicole Kidman for Babygirl
- Ensemble Performance Award: Conclave (Ralph Fiennes, Isabella Rossellini, Stanley Tucci, John Lithgow, Lucian Msamati)
- Chairman's Award: Timothée Chalamet for A Complete Unknown
- Rising Star Award: Ariana Grande for Wicked
- Visionary Award: Denis Villeneuve for Dune: Part Two

=== Creative Impact Awards ===
The following creative impact awards were presented:

- Creative Impact in Acting Award to Cynthia Erivo
- Creative Impact in Directing Award to Jacques Audiard
- Legend & Groundbreaker Award for Jennifer López

== Variety's 10 Directors to Watch ==
The list consisted of the following directors:

- Durga Chew-Bose for Bonjour Tristesse
- Coralie Fargeat for The Substance
- David Fortune for Color Book
- Drew Hancock for Companion
- Zoe Kravitz for Blink Twice
- Tom Nesher for Come Closer
- Halina Reijn for Babygirl
- James Sweeney for Twinless
- Magnus von Horn for The Girl with the Needle
- Malcolm Washington for The Piano Lesson
