= Audience Award Dramatic =

Film award

This is a list of winners of the Sundance Film Festival Audience Award for dramatic features.

== Winners ==
=== 1980s ===
- 1989: Sex, Lies, and Videotape

=== 1990s ===
- 1990: Longtime Companion
- 1991: One Cup of Coffee
- 1992: The Waterdance
- 1993: El Mariachi
- 1994: Spanking the Monkey
- 1995: Picture Bride
- 1996: The Spitfire Grill
- 1997: Hurricane Streets / Love Jones
- 1998: Smoke Signals
- 1999: Three Seasons

=== 2000s ===
- 2000: Two Family House
- 2001: Hedwig and the Angry Inch
- 2002: Real Women Have Curves
- 2003: The Station Agent
- 2004: Maria Full of Grace
- 2005: Hustle & Flow
- 2006: Quinceañera
- 2007: Grace Is Gone
- 2008: The Wackness
- 2009: Precious: Based on the Novel "Push" by Sapphire

=== 2010s ===
- 2010: Happythankyoumoreplease
- 2011: Circumstance
- 2012: The Sessions
- 2013: Fruitvale Station
- 2014: Whiplash
- 2015: Me and Earl and the Dying Girl
- 2016: The Birth of a Nation
- 2017: Crown Heights
- 2018: Burden
- 2019: Brittany Runs a Marathon

=== 2020s ===
- 2020: Minari
- 2021: CODA
- 2022: Cha Cha Real Smooth
- 2023: The Persian Version
- 2024: Dìdi (弟弟)
- 2025: Twinless
- 2026: Josephine

== International winners ==
- 1999: Run Lola Run / Train of Life
- 2000: Saving Grace
- 2001: The Road Home
- 2002: Bloody Sunday / The Last Kiss
- 2003: Whale Rider
- 2004: Seducing Doctor Lewis
- 2005: Brothers
- 2006: No. 2
- 2007: Once
- 2008: Captain Abu Raed
- 2009: An Education
- 2010: Undertow
- 2011: Kinyarwanda
- 2012: Valley of Saints
- 2013: Metro Manila
- 2014: To Kill a Man
- 2015: Umrika
- 2016: Between Sea and Land
- 2017: I Dream in Another Language
- 2018: The Guilty
- 2019: Queen of Hearts
- 2020: Identifying Features
- 2021: Hive
- 2022: Girl Picture
- 2023: Shayda
- 2024: Girls Will Be Girls
- 2025: DJ Ahmet
- 2026: Hold onto Me
