= International Short Film Festival of Cyprus =

Annual short film festival in Cyprus

- Location: Cyprus
- Founded: 2008; 18 years ago
- Website: isffc.com.cy

The International Short Film Festival of Cyprus (ISFFC) is a film festival for short films held in a different city of Cyprus each year. Founded in 2008, the festival is accredited by the European Film Academy and annually selects one short film from its International Competition section for consideration at the European Film Awards.

Its first ceremony was held in 2008, receiving over 300 submissions from 39 different countries. The jury was composed of Panicos Chrysanthou, Dervis Zaim, Demet Evgar and Simon Ostrovsky.

The festival was awarded the EFFE Label by the European Festivals Association for its artistic commitment, involvement in local communities, and European and global outlook.
