= Palm Springs International Film Festival =

Annual film festival held in Palm Springs, USA

- 2023 official poster
- Location: Palm Springs, California, U.S.
- Founded: 1989; 37 years ago
- Most recent: 2025
- Hosted by: Palm Springs International Film Society
- No. of films: 2026: 164
- Language: International
- Website: www.psfilmfest.org

Current: 37th
- 38th 36th

Palm Springs International Film Festival (sometimes stylized shortly as PSIFF) is a film festival held in Palm Springs, California, considered the largest film festival for world cinema in the United States. Originally promoted by Mayor Sonny Bono and then sponsored by Nortel, it started in 1989 and is held annually in January. It is run by the Palm Springs International Film Society, which also runs the Palm Springs International Festival of Short Films (ShortFest), a festival of short films and film market in June.

Though the festival does feature American independent films, the focus from its inception was to shine a spotlight on international cinema.

The festival was cancelled in both 2021 and 2022 due to the COVID-19 pandemic in California. It was held from January 6 to January 16 in 2023. The 34th edition screened 134 films from 64 countries including 27 premieres. Film Awards ceremony on January 5 at the Palm Springs Convention Center started the celebrations.

== Details ==
Michael Barker, co-president of Sony Pictures Classics, described the festival as a good place to show foreign-language movies and heralded this festival's ability to spread good word-of-mouth for movies. The event is noted for screening most foreign Oscar nominees. In 2013, the festival screened 42 of the 71 movies that were submitted by countries around the world to the Oscars for that year's foreign language film prize.

In the days before the festival's opening, several of the foreign filmmakers convene at Sunnylands, the Annenberg estate in Rancho Mirage, to trade strategies on funding, producing and promoting their movies.

The festival regularly attracts around 135,000 people, with some 70% coming from outside of the Coachella Valley, including Canada and Europe. It is noted for its Award Ceremonies where such actors as Christian Bale, Brad Pitt, Clint Eastwood, Sean Penn, Dustin Hoffman, Anne Hathaway, Allison Janney, Brie Larson and Leonardo DiCaprio have appeared. In January 2011, the festival's honorees included Ben Affleck and Danny Boyle. The current artistic director of the festival is Liliana Rodriguez.

In 2021 the main festival was not held, but the Palm Springs International Festival of Short Films on June 22–28 did go ahead. As of April 8, 2021, the next PSIFF was scheduled for January 6−17, 2022. However, due to rising cases of COVID-19, the 2022 festival was canceled.

In 2025, Kering was named a multiyear partner and new presenting sponsor of the Palm Springs International Film Awards.

== Awards ==
=== Film Gala Awards ===
The Gala awards are as follows:

- Sonny Bono Visionary Award
- Career Achievement Award
- Desert Palm Achievement Award
- Director of the Year Award,
- Frederick Loewe Award for Film Composing,
- Icon Award
- Chairman's Award,
- Ensemble Performance Award
- Spotlight Award

In 2014 the Desert Palm Achievement Award was given to Matthew McConaughey for his role in Dallas Buyers Club and Sandra Bullock for her role in Gravity, while Johnny Depp and Cate Blanchett received the Desert Palm Achievement Award in 2016 for Black Mass and Carol, respectively. Casey Affleck received the Desert Palm Achievement Award in 2017 for Manchester by the Sea. Gary Oldman and Saoirse Ronan received the Desert Palm Achievement Award in 2018 for their films Darkest Hour and Lady Bird.

=== Festival awards ===
The following awards were presented at the Palm Springs International Film Festival:

- FIPRESCI Prize for Best Foreign Language Film
- FIPRESCI Prize for Best Actor in a Foreign Language Film
- FIPRESCI Prize for Best Actress in a Foreign Language Film
- New Voices New Visions Award
- John Schlesinger Award
- CV Cine Award
- Ricky Jay Magic of Cinema Award
- GoE Bridging the Borders Award
- Audience Award for Best Narrative Feature
- Audience Award for Best Documentary Feature

== Desert Palm Achievement Award ==
=== Desert Palm Achievement, Actor ===
- 2005 – Liam Neeson for Kinsey
- 2006 – Jake Gyllenhaal for Brokeback Mountain
- 2008 – Daniel Day-Lewis for There Will Be Blood
- 2009 – Sean Penn for Milk
- 2010 – Jeff Bridges for Crazy Heart
- 2011 – Colin Firth for The King's Speech
- 2012 – Brad Pitt for Moneyball, The Tree of Life
- 2013 – Bradley Cooper for Silver Linings Playbook
- 2014 – Matthew McConaughey for Dallas Buyers Club
- 2015 – Eddie Redmayne for The Theory of Everything
- 2016 – Johnny Depp for Black Mass
- 2017 – Casey Affleck for Manchester by the Sea
- 2018 – Gary Oldman for Darkest Hour
- 2020 – Adam Driver for Marriage Story
- 2021 – Riz Ahmed for Sound of Metal
- 2022 – Andrew Garfield for Tick, Tick... Boom!
- 2023 – Colin Farrell for The Banshees of Inisherin
- 2024 – Cillian Murphy for Oppenheimer
- 2025 – Adrien Brody for The Brutalist
- 2026 – Leonardo DiCaprio for One Battle After Another

=== Desert Palm Achievement, Actress ===
- 2004 – Naomi Watts for 21 Grams
- 2005 – Laura Linney for Kinsey
- 2006 – Charlize Theron for North Country
- 2007 – Kate Winslet for Little Children
- 2008 – Halle Berry for Things We Lost in the Fire
- 2009 – Anne Hathaway for Rachel Getting Married
- 2010 – Marion Cotillard for Nine
- 2011 – Natalie Portman for Black Swan
- 2012 – Michelle Williams for My Week with Marilyn
- 2013 – Naomi Watts for The Impossible
- 2014 – Sandra Bullock for Gravity
- 2015 – Julianne Moore for Still Alice
- 2016 – Cate Blanchett for Carol, Truth
- 2017 – Natalie Portman for Jackie
- 2018 – Saoirse Ronan for Lady Bird
- 2019 – Olivia Colman for The Favourite
- 2020 – Renée Zellweger for Judy
- 2021 – Viola Davis for Ma Rainey's Black Bottom
- 2022 – Jessica Chastain for The Eyes of Tammy Faye
- 2023 – Cate Blanchett for Tár
- 2024 – Emma Stone for Poor Things
- 2025 – Angelina Jolie for Maria
- 2026 – Amanda Seyfried for The Testament of Ann Lee

== Sonny Bono Visionary Award ==
The following celebrities were honored with the award since 2004:

- 2004 – Sidney Sheldon
- 2005 – Kevin Spacey for Acting, Producing and Directing
- 2006 – David Cronenberg for A History of Violence
- 2007 – Todd Field for Little Children
- 2008 – Joe Wright for Atonement
- 2009 – Gus Van Sant for Milk
- 2010 – Quentin Tarantino for Inglourious Basterds
- 2011 – Danny Boyle for 127 Hours
- 2012 – Michel Hazanavicius for The Artist
- 2013 – Tom Hooper for Les Misérables
- 2014 – U2 for "Ordinary Love (U2 song)" in Mandela: Long Walk to Freedom
- 2015 – Richard Linklater for Boyhood
- 2016 – Tom McCarthy for Spotlight
- 2019 – Alfonso Cuarón for Roma
- 2020 – Martin Scorsese for The Irishman

=== Visionary Award ===
- 2025 – Denis Villeneuve for Dune: Part Two
- 2026 – Guillermo del Toro and cast (Oscar Isaac, Jacob Elordi and Mia Goth) for Frankenstein
