= List of Shortland Street characters introduced in 1994 =

The following is a list of characters that first appeared in the New Zealand soap opera Shortland Street in 1994, by order of first appearance.

== Marilyn Bluck ==
Marilyn Bluck
- Shortland Street character
- Portrayed by: Donna Akersten
- Duration: 1994, 1995
- First appearance: 19 January 1994
- Last appearance: 31 December 1995
- Introduced by: Tony Holden (1994); Gravin Strawhan (1995)
In-universe information
- Occupation: Receptionist at Shortland Street
- Husband: Ian Harrison
- Nephews: Nick Harrison

Marilyn Bluck (previously Harrison) was the overbearing sister in law to Jenny Harrison (Maggie Harper). Introduced at the start of 1994 as an emergency temp receptionist, Marilyn soon got under the skin of the staff by getting names wrong, changing processes, and disturbing doctors in person to see if they were available to take phone calls - as she didn't want to disturb them by simply transferring the calls. Jenny felt there was a conflict of interest in managing Marilyn's eccentricities, as Jenny owed her life to Marilyn. It was soon revealed that Marilyn was responsible for rescuing Jenny from her abusive marriage, taking Jenny and a young Nick to her Dargaville home after a hospitalisation following an assault. However, Marilyn's husband Ian saw this as a betrayal, failing to believe his brother would be abusive towards Jenny and cost Marilyn her own marriage.

Soon after arriving in Ferndale, Marilyn tried to steal Laurie (Chic Littlewood) from Marj (Elizabeth McRae) and soon tried to steal Marj's room and job permanently. Marilyn wore her heart in her sleeve, and motivated sales person - hosting a successful lingerie party for the female staff, sparking Kirsty's entrepreneurial spirit and inadvertently was the catalyst for inspiring Stuart Neilson (Martin Henderson) by directing them to a self-help guru. Despite picking up work at the cafe, Marilyn soon left for Dargaville - realising she had burned many bridges in her short time in Ferndale and not wanting to stand in the way of Marj and Laurie's happiness. Soon after returning home, Jenny received word that Marilyn had been hospitalised with a breakdown. Gossip within the clinic alleged that Marilyn's ex-husband came home with his new, younger, and pregnant girlfriend resulting in a fish pie being thrown. Chris put Marilyn's name forward as a replacement to run the cafe, but was vetoed by Gina.

She returned in 1995, having left Dargaville in shame when her lover Imran had disappeared back to Pakistan with her savings. Marilyn returned to working at reception and became infatuated with Dr Finlay Keats (Peter McCauley). However the traumatizing truck crash at Christmas saw Marilyn pack her things, reunite with Imran (Ravi Rasalingam), and leave for Pakistan. Her nickname from her colleagues at the clinic was "Motormouth Marilyn".

== Simon Hilton-Jones ==
Simon Hilton-Jones
- Shortland Street character
- Portrayed by: John Wraight
- Duration: 1994
- First appearance: 1 February 1994
- Last appearance: 7 February 1994
- Introduced by: Tony Holden
In-universe information
- Occupation: Doctor at Shortland Street

Dr. Simon Hilton-Jones was the hippy doctor abruptly hired to replace Katherine Blake (Margaret Umbers). Simon was the youngest of the Hilton-Jones family, and whose father held a position on the medical council. Simon proved unpopular with the staff due to his poor time management and apparent lack of interest in prescribing medication or taking comprehensive histories. Though inspirational to the young Jonathon McKenna (Kieren Hutchison). CEO - Michael (Paul Gittins) reluctantly decided to let Simon go, but not before he shred a few words of wisdom to Jonathon, something that inspired him to become a doctor.

== Hilary Sturgess ==
Hilary Sturgess
- Shortland Street character
- Portrayed by: Susan Brady
- Duration: 1994
- First appearance: 11 February 1994; Episode 450
- Last appearance: 24 June 1994; Episode 545
- Introduced by: Tony Holden
In-universe information
- Occupation: Property developer
- Father: Noel Sturgess

Hilary Sturgess was a reoccurring protagonist introduced early in 1994 as a ruthless property developer and daughter of Shortland Street shareholder Noel Sturgess. After she left her electronic organiser at Kennedy's Bar, she was impressed by Stuart Neilson's (Martin Henderson) detective skills and offered him a role in her business. When the clinic had liquidity issues following the opening of the new High Dependency Unit, it is soon revealed that the construction company that is owed money belongs to Hilary. After meeting with acting clinic director Hone Ropata (Temuera Morrison), Hilary became increasingly interested in the business operations of the clinic and promptly manipulated clinic director Michael McKenna into selling his shares to her. Hone began affair with Hilary, clouding his judgement.

Noel teamed up with Jenny Harrison (Maggie Harper) to try and block Hilary's restructure plans, however Noel died the night prior to the shareholder meeting where the plans were going to be voted on. Hilary was bequeathed her father's shares in the hospital becoming the majority shareholder and replacing her father on the board of directors. Without opposition, Hilary rolled out the restructure and brought in Australian firm Ideal Health and their consultant Dr Ethan Gill to overhaul her investment. When Hilary is forced to fire Hone from his acting clinic director position, and appointed Ethan to replace him, it triggers the pair to break up.

By June, Hilary's fortune had turned. Stuart had made a series of costly mistakes for a marina redevelopment, ultimately costing Hilary too much money to continue with the plans and resulted in her firing Stuart. An offshore investment failed resulting in her company going bust, and any money in her father's estate was lost to debtors. Ideal Health then revealed their true agenda by buying rival, and larger, hospital St Catherine's and pulled out of the Shortland Street contract. Not seeing the clinic as financially viable and with Hone no longer interested in her - Hilary was forced to agree to sell her stake in the clinic for a significant loss to the staff to operate it as a cooperative model. Hone met with Hilary to make peace, with Hilary revealing plans to return to her roots and buy an arthouse movie theatre down south.

== Greg Feeney ==
Greg Feeney was the drug dealing step brother of Carmen Roberts (Theresa Healey) and potential love interest for Kirsty Knight (Angela Dotchin). The character was portrayed by Tim Balme for numerous stints up until 2000.

== Grace Kwan ==
Dr. Grace Kwan first appeared in early 1994 portrayed by Lynette Forday. She departed in 1997 before returning 16 years later in a recurring role.

== Charlotte Olsen ==
Charlotte Olsen
- Shortland Street character
- Portrayed by: Nicola Cliff
- Duration: 1994, 1995, 1996
- First appearance: 1 March 1994
- Last appearance: 1996
- Introduced by: Tony Holden
In-universe information
- First cousins: Gretchen Olsen

Charlotte Olsen was the head girl of Ferndale high and nemesis of Rachel McKenna (Angela Bloomfield). She also clashed with Nick Harrison (Karl Burnett) and had him removed from his prefect position. Charlotte grew jealous when Rachel started to date her crush – Tim Cunningham (Richard Vette) and successfully broke the two up.

== Ellen Crozier ==
Ellen Crozier was portrayed by Robyn Malcolm for nearly 6 years. She proved to be one of the show's most successful and well received characters.

== Minnie Crozier ==
Minnie Crozier was the teenage daughter of Ellen (Robyn Malcolm), who often found herself in challenging and dangerous relationships. She was portrayed by Katrina Devine for 7 years before she was axed as part of a cast overhaul.

== Johnny Marinovich ==
Johnny Marinovich
- Shortland Street character
- Portrayed by: Stelios Yiakmis
- Duration: 1994–98
- First appearance: 9 April 1994; Episode 490
- Last appearance: August 1998
- Introduced by: Tony Holden
In-universe information
- Father: Davor Marinovich (previously Petrovich)
- Mother: Sally Marinovich
- Wife: Ellen Crozier (1989–1996); Tiffany Pratt (1998)
- Sons: Bradley Kearney
- Daughters: Hannah Lomax; Maria Marinovich

Dr. Johnny Marinovich was introduced as the often mentioned husband of new character Ellen Crozier (Robyn Malcolm). Before Yiakmis was cast, another actor had won the role but had dropped out. Yiakmis signed on to an initial 3 weeks, before being extended to 3 months. His contract was then extended to a further 6 months before he ended up becoming a core cast member. Johnny arrived to Ferndale in early 1994 but his marriage broke up when Ellen discovered Johnny had fathered a daughter through an affair many years beforehand. Johnny was tempted to get back with Ellen but when she had an affair he started a relationship with Jenny (Maggie Harper), who fell pregnant. Johnny would struggle to cope with the news that his father Davor (Bill Johnson) was a Nazi war criminal after being discovered by Ruth Brasch, (Joanne Briant) and his father's brain damaged state after an attempt at suicide. Following Jenny's abortion, Johnny started an affair with Ellen but returned to Jenny when she developed cancer. When Jenny suggested marriage, Johnny left her. He had a brief affair with teenager Ramona Derby (Ashleigh Seagar) and another with widow Julia Thornton (Elizabeth Hawthorne). Johnny had an affair with Isobel Kearney (Jennifer Ward-Lealand) and she became pregnant shortly before Johnny began to date Tiffany Warner (Alison James). The two married in 1998 and Tiffany also fell pregnant however she fell from a building and died. The baby was saved and Johnny ended up leaving with his daughter.

== Rebecca Frost ==
Rebecca Frost
- Shortland Street character
- Portrayed by: Luisa Burgess
- Duration: 1994–97
- First appearance: 13 April 1994; Episode 492
- Last appearance: 30 April 1997; Episode 1243
- Introduced by: Tony Holden
In-universe information
- Occupation: Ambulance Officer; Nurse (1994-1995); Missionary (1996)
- Sisters: Janet Frost

Rebecca (Becs) Frost appeared as a regular character for 3 years. She arrived as the paramedic partner of Sam Aleni (Rene Naufahu) and an old nursing school friend of Jo Jordan (Greer Robson).

Rebecca orchestrated a second job as Chris Warner's (Michael Galvin) nurse following his spinal injury in a car accident. It soon turned out Rebecca was out for revenge after Chris played around with her sister Janet. Chris was not phased by her attempts at revenge and she developed a degree of empathy for him, however when Chris accidentally suffered a fall, the truth is revealed and Rebecca is fired from being his nurse. Rebecca then moved into the McKenna's home to supervise Rachel McKenna (Angela Bloomfield) whilst her parents were on holidays. When the McKennas returned, Jo invited her to move into her share house with Stuart Neilson (Martin Henderson) and Kristy (Angela Dotchin). However, Stuart professed his feelings for her which she didn't reciprocate, and moved into Sam and Carmen's (Theresa Healey)share house. Rebecca found that living, working, and socialising with Sam was too much for their relationship to handle and moved back into Kristy's place after Jo leaves town. Rebecca discovered Chris's drug addiction and arranged for him to go into rehab. After being suspended from the ambulance service for speeding in Chris's car, Rebecca started working as a nurse at the clinic and began dating Chris. Rebecca struggled with the change of pace with hospital nursing and Chris left for a holiday in Rarotonga without her. In Chris's absence, she develops feelings for Manny Atutahi (Albert Belz) which caused Chris to act out in jealousy. The relationship Manny was short lived as he began a relationship with Rachel.

Whilst training for a triathlon, Rebecca's heart valve started to fail following complications from having rheumatic fever as a child. The brush with death caused her to become a born again Christian. She dated Police Officer Erik van der Molen (Peter Daube), however they break up in December just prior to having heart surgery for a new heart valve. With a new lease on life Rebecca left Ferndale in early 1996 to become a missionary in Africa. Rebecca soon returned, having struggled to reconcile her faith with the suffering she witnessed. She began a relationship with the new social worker Kane Taiaroa (Joe Folau) and formed a Christian rock band with him and Nick Harrison (Karl Burnett). The relationship with Kane ended suddenly as he fled Ferndale after sleeping with Jonathon McKenna (Kieren Hutchison) and struggled with his bisexuality.

Rebecca and ambulance partner Rangi Heremaia (Blair Strang) finally admitted their feelings for each other, however a motorcycle accident left Rangi paralysed and stuck in a reluctant love triangle with his existing girlfriend - Rachel. In 1997, Rangi had recovered and finally began a relationship with Rebecca. Their happiness was short lived when Rebecca developed endocarditis due to the heart valve she had received being faulty. Rebecca underwent surgery and her recovery at first appeared positive. Whilst Rangi went to buy a ring to propose, Rebecca’s condition rapidly deteriorated and died on the operating table. Devastated clinic staff raised funds for Rebecca’s funeral. Rangi proclaimed his love one final time during the eulogy, which was quickly overshadowed by a drunken rant from Rachel.

== Annie Flynn ==
Annie Flynn
- Shortland Street character
- Portrayed by: Rebecca Hobbs
- Duration: 1994
- First appearance: 12 May 1994; Episode 514
- Last appearance: 4 August 1994; Episode 574
- Introduced by: Tony Holden

Annie Flynn first appeared in May 1994. She was hired at the hospital as replacement for the recently deceased Steve Mills and shocked her old university boyfriend Guy Warner (Craig Parker) by winning at date with him at a fundraising night. Guy was unwilling to reveal the reason why the pair broke up, resulting in his current girlfriend Carmen (Theresa Healey) imposing a sex ban until he was willing to reveal the whole truth. Annie lived up to her predecessor's reputation of being a tease and trickster, actively joining the other nurses in mocking the new hospital management consultant Ethan Gill (Stephen Lovatt), and tricked Carmen and Guy to be locked in the supply room until Guy revealed the truth - the two were previously an item at university before she left him for a woman.

Annie soon caught the eye of Guy's older brother Chris Warner (Michael Galvin), who was unaware of Annie's sexual orientation. Qualified in remedial massage, Annie assisted in Chris's rehabilitation from a spinal injury with massage sessions at his home. Annie became attracted to the recently returned Dr Meredith Fleming (Stephanie Wilkin) whilst the pair worked together to set up an IVF clinic. After initial hesitation on Meredith's behalf, the two became an item much to the shock of Chris and the clinic staff. Once the clinic was established, Meredith decided to return to Dunedin and Annie followed a week later.

== Ethan Gill ==
Dr Ethan Gill
- Shortland Street character
- Portrayed by: Stephen Lovatt
- Duration: 1994
- First appearance: 20 May 1994; Episode 520
- Last appearance: 17 June 1994; Episode 540
- Introduced by: Tony Holden
In-universe information
- Occupation: Management consultant Doctor

Dr Ethan Gill was brought in as a management consultant to lead the restructure introduced by Hilary Sturgess (Susan Brady). Ethan worked for Ideal Health, a large Australasian hospital management company that was looking to break into the New Zealand market. Ethan quickly alienated many staff with the roll out of the “Ideal Way” recommended changes and orchestrated the removal of acting clinic director Hone Ropata (Temuera Morrison). Finding the nursing staff to be particularly difficult to deal with, he brought in former Director of Nursing Paul Churchill as a Nursing Consultant. Whilst Ethan was initially suspected to be behind the recent assaults of sex workers, Carmen Roberts and Guy Warner (Craig Parker) discovered that he was instead a regular customer and had a cleaning fetish. It was soon after that Ideal Health announced their true plan of buying and operating the larger rival hospital St Catherine's, and pulled out of Shortland Street, leaving it potentially financially unviable.

== Tim Cunningham ==
Tim Cunningham
- Shortland Street character
- Portrayed by: Richard Vette
- Duration: 1994
- First appearance: 22 June 1994
- Last appearance: 15 November 1994
- Introduced by: Tony Holden
In-universe information
- Daughters: Lucy Derby

Tim Cunningham was the head boy of Ferndale high school. Rachel McKenna's (Angela Bloomfield) rival Charlotte (Nicola Cliff) had a crush on Tim and as a result Rachel started dating him to spite her. However Rachel fell in love with Tim and was devastated when he broke up with her when Minnie (Katrina Devine) revealed Rachel's plan. The two eventually reconciled but Rachel was shocked to learn Tim was the father of Ramona's (Ashleigh Seagar) baby and was refusing to offer support. The two broke up.

== Ruth Brasch ==
Ruth Brasch
- Shortland Street character
- Portrayed by: Joanna Briant
- Duration: 1994, 1995
- First appearance: 17 August 1994; Episode 583
- Last appearance: July 1995
- Introduced by: Gavin Strawhan
In-universe information
- Father: Laurie Brasch
- Stepmother: Marj Brasch
- Sisters: Sally Brasch; Sarah Brasch

Ruth Brasch was the devout Jewish daughter of Marj's (Elizabeth McRae) fiancé Laurie Brasch (Chic Littlewood). Ruth was shocked to meet her father's lover and soon began running interference between the two. To distract her, Marj arranged for Ruth to cover for Jenny at the clinic. Whilst Michael McKenna (Paul Gittins) was initially impressed with her administration skills, Ruth slowly began to overstep the mark by sharing McKenna's diary with his wife and cutting him out of business decisions. Ruth began to suspect that her father's deteriorating mental condition was Alzheimer's disease. She soon isolated Laurie from Marj and tried to sell his nursery. When Laurie is diagnosed with having a treatable brain tumour, Marj proposed marriage and proved that the nursery could be a profitable business. Whilst Ruth was not against the marriage, she refused to attend it if it was to be held in a church. Following a venue change, Ruth was able to attend and leaves the clinic to manage the nursery whilst Marj and Laurie were on their honeymoon.

Ruth returned the following year and began to manage the local bar. She started to date Rangi Heremaia (Blair Strang) however the revelation that she had been molested by her uncle saw Ruth depart in July.

== Otis Jackson ==
Otis Jackson
- Shortland Street character
- Portrayed by: Shane Bartle
- Duration: 1994
- First appearance: 18 August 1994; Episode 584
- Last appearance: 24 March 1995; Episode 725
- Introduced by: Tony Holden
In-universe information
- Occupation: Nurse Aide (1994); Registered Nurse (1995)

Nurse Neville Otis Jackson started persistently telephoning the clinic in August 1994, wanting to speak to Dr Michael McKenna (Paul Gittins). Otis eventually confronted Michael in the car park and provided him with a copy of his CV. Whilst he was trained as a nurse, Director of Nursing Ellen Crozier (Robyn Malcolm) noticed that Otis was not yet a registered nurse. Impressed by his persistence and ingenuity, Michael offered Otis the role of Nurse Aide. Otis was highly energetic, much to the humour and concern of his colleagues. Ellen made inquiries into why he was not registered, forcing Otis to reveal he had a criminal conviction from joyriding as a teenager. Otis soon had to face his past when Craig Develter (Joel Tobeck), the boy he ran over, was admitted and started to psychologically torture Otis.

By January 1995 Otis was a registered nurse. He approached acting clinic director Chris Warner (Michael Galvin) for a change in his position to reflect his accreditation. Otis was made a permanent registered nurse and received a slight pay rise to base pay. His success was overshadowed by the arrival of new nurse Tiffany Pratt (Alison James). Whilst nursing Paul Churchill (Simon Prast), Otis was drugged and stripped for his uniform as a part of Paul's escape from incarceration. Otis's behaviour became increasingly quirky towards his female colleagues, regularly sneaking into the apartment of Grace Kwan (Lynette Forday) and Tiffany to leave gifts and clean Tiffany's room. Whilst Tiffany forgave him and Ellen tried to convince him to stay, Otis felt his position was untenable when the rest of the clinic staff found out and resigned to take a job in Saudi Arabia. The nursing staff threw a surprise farewell party and gifted him a sandboard to show there were no hard feelings amongst the staff.

== Waverley Wilson ==
Waverley "Wave" Harrison (also Wilson, previously Wallasee) was portrayed by Claire Chitham and introduced as the cousin of Rachel McKenna (Angela Bloomfield) and a love interest for Nick Harrison who she eventually married eight years after her arrival to the show. Originally introduced as a reoccurring character in 1994 and departing in early 1995, returned in 1998 and stayed until 2005. The character returned along with husband Nick for the show's 25th anniversary episode that aired on 25 May 2017. Waverley also returned with her step-son Lucas and three of her children for the 2022 finale.

== Craig Develter ==
Craig Develter
- Shortland Street character
- Portrayed by: Joel Tobeck
- Duration: 1994, 1996-1997
- First appearance: 26 October 1994; Episode 633
- Last appearance: 30 January 1997; Episode 1179
- Introduced by: Gravin Strawhan (1994); Judith Trye (1996)

Craig Develter appeared in stints in 1994, 1996 and 1997, portrayed by Joel Tobeck. Craig lived in the same hometown as Nurse Otis Jackson's (Shane Bartle) and has great potential as a teenager but this changed when a drunk, teenage Otis ran him over whilst joyriding. Craig was seriously injured and lost the use of his legs, becoming a wheelchair user. Craig was admitted as patient to the clinic with a pressure wound and was reunited with Otis. Without a permanent home, and assuming they were friends, Craig was invited to move into Otis's sharehouse by flat mates Rebecca and Kristy. The clinic staff soon realised the true manipulative nature of Craig when he began to blackmail and emotionally torture Otis to provide him with home care as payback for his injuries. After Ellen Crozier (Robyn Malcolm) takes over his home care, she challenged Craig to exercise his independence and stop torturing Otis. Craig made peace with Otis and moved into a flat with Waverley Wilson (Claire Chitham).

Craig returned in 1996 in a much better mindset having adjusted to his restrictions. However his disdain for the "system" was still apparent and he revealed secrets to manipulate the seriousness of paraplegia to the newly injured Rangi Heremaia (Blair Strang). Craig was bitter over Rangi’s relationship with Rachel McKenna (Angela Bloomfield) and started a campaign against her, locking her in the garage after work and staging a protest outside the R Bar claiming discrimination against those with disabilities. After Rangi ultimately sided with Rachel, Craig left admitted he was lonely and agreed to turn over a new leaf.

Craig was later identified as "one of the show's more memorable characters" by a reviewer from The New Zealand Herald, who also called him a "badass".

== Ramona Derby ==
Ramona Derby
- Shortland Street character
- Portrayed by: Ashleigh Seagar
- Duration: 1994–96
- First appearance: 4 November 1994
- Last appearance: 26 March 1996
- Introduced by: Gavin Strawhan
In-universe information
- Daughters: Lucy Derby

Ramona Derby appeared for 16 months between 1994 and 1996. Ramona attended the same school as Rachel McKenna (Angela Bloomfield) and was a shoo-in for dux of the school. However, when Ramona discovered she was pregnant, the school refused her the position. It was soon revealed that the father of Ramona's child was Rachel's boyfriend Tim Cunningham (Richard Vette). Nonetheless the two remained friends and in 1995 Ramona gave birth to her daughter Lucy. She began to date Nick Harrison (Karl Burnett) but disaster struck at Christmas time when Nick misplaced Lucy. Upon the baby's recovery, Ramona split from Nick and began to date older man – Johnny Marinovich (Stelios Yiakmis). The affair was short and Ramona ended up leaving Ferndale shortly into the new year.

== Vic Roberts ==
Vic Roberts
- Shortland Street character
- Portrayed by: Desmond Kelly
- Duration: 1994
- First appearance: 25 November 1994; Episode 655
- Last appearance: 15 December 1994; Episode 669
- Introduced by: Tony Holden
In-universe information
- Occupation: Priest
- Wife: Pauline Roberts (until 1974)
- Daughters: Carmen Roberts
- Stepsons: Greg Feeney
- Granddaughters: Tuesday Warner

Vic Roberts appeared in a single guest stint through late-November to mid-December. He was Carmen Roberts' (Theresa Healey)'s estranged, alcoholic, and abusive father from Levin. Guy Warner (Craig Parker) tracked down Vic and invited him to stay in Ferndale. Vic was in poor health and was admitted to the clinic with seemingly undiagnosed health complications that resulted in a leg needing to be amputated. Carmen made amends with her father upon seeing him in pain after the amputation surgery, and was prepared to fund his ongoing nursing care. However Carmen soon discovered that Vic was completely aware that he would need full-time nursing care prior to coming to Ferndale and was after the money she had won in the lottery. Declining a $10,000 payout from Carmen to leave her life forever, Guy eventually agreed to pay for Vic to return to Levin and his ongoing care on the condition to leave Carmen's life and never return.

== Manny Atutahi ==
Manny Atutahi
- Shortland Street character
- Portrayed by: Albert Belz
- Duration: 1994–95
- First appearance: 29 November 1994
- Last appearance: 3 November 1995
- Introduced by: Tony Holden
In-universe information
- Mother: Aorewa Atutahi
- Uncles: Hone Ropata

Hamana "Manny" Atutahi first appeared in late 1994 as the nephew of established character, Hone Ropata (Temuera Morrison). Manny arrived to stay with Hone and despite attracting Rebecca Frost (Luisa Burgess), Manny fell in with the criminal underworld and after landing in hospital, Hone accidentally killed Manny's attacker with a punch. Manny dated Rebecca but left her for Rachel McKenna (Angela Bloomfield). When Rachel was harassed by her university lecturer, Manny viciously attacked him and was sent to prison for assault. Rachel left Manny for Rangi (Blair Strang), resulting in an increasingly violent Manny stabbing him when he came to visit. When Rachel learned of the attack, she disowned Manny forever.

== Linda Corrine ==
Priest Corrine
- Shortland Street character
- Portrayed by: Shirley Duke
- Duration: 1994–95, 2009, 2010, 2012
- First appearance: 23 December 1994
- Last appearance: 14 December 2012
- Introduced by: Tony Holden (1994); Steven Zanoski (2009, 2010, 2012)
In-universe information
- Occupation: Priest

Linda Corrine^{1} was portrayed by Shirley Duke in guest roles from 1994 to 1995, 2009, 2010 and 2012. She was the priest who was the celebrant at Kirsty Knight (Angela Dotchin) and Lionel Skeggins (John Leigh) wedding. When Stuart Neilson (Martin Henderson) interrupted the marriage, the wedding was cancelled but Priest Corrine married the two later that evening on their houseboat. Priest Corrine returned 14 years later when she married Morgan Braithwaite (Bonnie Soper) and Gerald Tippett (Harry McNaughton) during a supposed rehearsal. She returned a year later as the celebrant for Sophie McKay (Kimberley Crossman) and Kieran Mitchell's (Adam Rickitt) wedding which again was gatecrashed and cancelled. In 2012 Corrine acted as the minister for Luke Durville (Gerald Urquhart) and Bella Cooper's (Amelia Reid) wedding.

== Wilbur Skeggins ==
Wilbur Skeggins
- Shortland Street character
- Portrayed by: Uncredited (1994); Ian Mune (1997)
- Duration: 1994, 1997
- First appearance: 23 December 1994
- Last appearance: 18 December 1997
- Introduced by: Gavin Strawhan (1994); Simon Bennett (1997)
In-universe information
- Wife: Angelina Skeggins (1997—)
- Sons: Lionel Skeggins
- Grandsons: Luke Billingham

Wilbur Skeggins made an uncredited guest appearance in the infamous 1994 cliffhanger where he attended his son, Lionel's (John Leigh) wedding to Kirsty Knight (Angela Dotchin). Wilbur visited his son in 1997 and later in the year, Lionel traveled to Wellington after hearing Wilbur had suffered a heart attack. Though it turned out that Wilbur had been faking illness in a bid to win back his "mail order" wife - Angelina (Geeling Ng). Upon discovering the news, Lionel and Kirsty returned to Ferndale however the small plane they were traveling in failed and the two were involved in a dramatic plane crash.

== Notes ==
- ^Note 1Linda Corrine was credited as "Priest Corrine" in her appearances in both 1994 and 1995, whilst being credited as "Celebrant" in 2009, 2010 and 2012. She was given the name "Linda" through dialogue in March 2010.
