= Darryl Neilson =

- Shortland Street character
- Portrayed by: Mark Ferguson
- Duration: 1992–1995
- First appearance: 2 June 1992
- Last appearance: 24 March 1995
- Introduced by: Caterina De Nave (1992); Brian Lennane (1993); Tony Holden (1994)
In-universe information
- Occupation: Pharmaceutical distributor and representative (until 1995)
- Father: Tom Neilson
- Mother: Marj Neilson
- Brothers: Patrick Neilson; Damien Neilson; Stuart Neilson
- Half-sisters: Jane Fitzgerald
- Wife: Diane Neilson (1986–94)
- Children: Robert Neilson; Melissa Neilson
- Sons: Robert Neilson
- Daughters: Melissa Neilson; Rebecca Stanton

Darryl Neilson is a fictional character in the New Zealand soap opera Shortland Street. Appearing sporadically, Darryl made several recurring appearance from 1992 to the character's death in 1995. He was portrayed by Mark Ferguson.

A character that fans "loved to hate", Darryl was introduced as the antagonistic son of receptionist Marj Neilson (Elizabeth McRae) and paramedic Tom Neilson (Adrian Keeling). Utilised in the soap as a means to develop the character of Marj, Darryl was involved in numerous high-profile story lines. These included attempting to rape Kirsty Knight (Angela Dotchin), drugging Chris Warner (Michael Galvin) so that he missed his wedding day, faking the abduction of his own children, distributing dodgy drugs, stealing Grace Kwan's (Lynette Forday) egg cells and eventually drowning after attempting to murder Kirsty. Darryl's personality was seen as manipulative, egotistical and destructive. However, it has been noted that his saving grace was his "love for his mum".

== Creation and casting ==
Upon the show first airing, audiences struggled to relate to the character of Marj Neilson (Elizabeth McRae), a character played largely for comic relief. The character was the matriarch of the Neilson family unit however upon the rewriting of Stuart Neilson (Martin Henderson), more members were added to the family. To add more depth to the character of Marj and focus her story lines less on comedy, producers decided to introduce another of her sons that would appear antagonistic and help audiences sympathize with her. The character of Darryl was created because of this. Without auditioning, Mark Ferguson was offered the role in what he saw as typecasting due to his widows peak.

Ferguson appeared in a sporadic role for several years before running into a "contractual dispute" with producers. As a result of the dispute, Ferguson requested Darryl be killed off the soap. Darryl was killed off on the episode airing 21 March 1995, with his body making his final appearance several days later. Ferguson returned to the soap 3 years later as Darryl's brother, Damien Neilson.

== Storylines ==
Darryl arrived to Ferndale in mid 1992 and refused to accept responsibility for the paternity of his newborn daughter. He began to date Kirsty (Angela Dotchin) but shocked all when he attempted to rape her when she rejected his advances for sex. He was disowned by his father Tom (Adrian Keeling) and fled Ferndale after being dumped by his wife. He returned the following year when he began to work in the clinic distributing pharmaceuticals. He grew fixated with his colleague Alison Raynor (Danielle Cormack) and used his mysterious illness to gain her attention.

When she reconciled with Chris Warner (Michael Galvin), Darryl drugged Chris and locked him in a barn; preventing him from attending his wedding and causing Alison to flee the country. Darryl sacrificed his kidney for his dying father and desperately tried to separate his mother Marj (Elizabeth McRae) from her lover Laurie (Chic Littlewood) through blackmail. He later covered up the death of Jean-Luc Mafart (Pierre Foret).

He returned to Ferndale again several months later and began to flirt with Waverley Wilson (Claire Chitham). After an argument with his ex-wife Diane (Susannah Devereux), Darryl faked the abduction of his children and let Waverley take the blame, much to the disgust of Marj. Marj disowned her son when he began to use her house for storage of illegal pharmaceuticals. Darryl's dodgy drugs caused the death of a patient and the near death of Lionel Skeggins (John Leigh). Kirsty took out another personal vendetta against Darryl for nearly killing her fiancé and as a result, Darryl manipulated Stuart (Martin Henderson) into disrupting the wedding. Darryl began to date Grace Kwan (Lynette Forday) but caused controversy when it turned out he was stealing her egg cells. Nonetheless the two planned to flee Ferndale but when Kirsty confronted Darryl on a houseboat about his illegal drug trafficking, he attacked her and fell overboard. His body was found several days later floating in Auckland Harbour.

Ferguson requested Darryl be killed off following a contractual dispute with producers. The character ultimately drowned in the Auckland Harbour.

== Character development ==
=== Characterisation ===
Throughout Darryl's run on Shortland Street, he was identified as cunning, evil and nasty. Ferguson described the character as dynamic, saying; "I really like playing the part, because whenever he's there, he makes things happen. He's a very dynamic character. He really gets people involved with the show." He also stated that Darryl was cunning, but not smart; "I try and put some of my own sense of humour in Darryl. I like to give him lots of different sides. He's very ambitious, like he can control situations around him. But he's not that bright, really. If he was just a bit smarter he'd be worth an absolute fortune. ... If Darryl was just a bit smarter, if he heightened his sights, then he could come back and try for Prime Minister". Darryl's one redeeming factor was named as his love for his mother.

=== Antagonism ===
The character of Darryl was written as a "villain" archetype. The character is remembered heavily for his antagonistic characteristics. His most prominent storyline was when he locked major character Chris Warner in a barn, so as he would miss his wedding day, a storyline often recollected on by actors and producers. However the character also went through numerous other storylines, including the very first episode where Darryl fathered a child, only to push responsibility onto his teenage brother. The character of Darryl was said to be introduced to further develop the character of Marj and make her less comic relief. The character's evil nature was so great, producer Steven Zanoski thought it was a great precedent for villains to follow. Darryl's character also helped the audience sympathize with Marj, having her stuck with a "no-good" son. Darryl's character was truly explored within his first year, when Darryl cruely attempted to rape Kirsty and forced his wife to provide him with an alibi so no charges would be laid. The rape storyline pitch was at the time so controversial, international executives worried it would "sully" the character of Kirsty. The character reached his peak villainy when he stole girlfriend Grace's eggs and started to use Marj's house as storage for illegal drugs. The character finally reached his end when he fell off a boat and drowned, while trying to murder Kirsty. It has been suggested that it was always obvious Darryl was to get his comeuppance as this was part of fulfilling the "villain" archetype.

== Reception ==
Darryl has been described as the soap's "original badboy" and Ferguson described him as a character fans "loved to hate". Darryl has since become an iconic character, being awarded the third best character alongside brother Damien, to ever feature on the soap. The storylines that saw Darryl lock Chris Warner in a barn before his wedding and the characters death, have been voted by fans as two of the shows most iconic moments. Michael Galvin (Chris Warner) praised Ferguson and the spiking storyline, stating; "Darryl was the show's first great villain and Mark Ferguson did a great job channelling his inner Satan. I remember shooting the scene where he drugs Chris pre locking him up and Chris collapses on the table. He was just supposed to glare down at me villainously as I slumped, but when it came to the take he looked down at me as per rehearsal then disdainfully pushed me off the table with his boot. I fell out of shot and on to the floor and managed not to start laughing until they called cut." Ferguson enjoyed the character of Darryl and his sporadic nature, stating, "Darryl wasn't the sort of character you would sit down for tea with."

== See also ==
- List of soap opera villains
