= Nick Harrison (Shortland Street) =

Fictional character on Shortland Street

- Shortland Street character
- Portrayed by: Karl Burnett
- Duration: 1992–2005, 2017
- First appearance: 26 May 1992
- Last appearance: 25 May 2017
- Introduced by: Caterina De Nave (1992); Maxine Fleming (2017)
- Book appearances: Nick's Story – Shortland Street Books (1996)
In-universe information
- Occupation: Businessman business manager bar owner accounting tutor
- Father: Barry Harrison
- Mother: Jenny Harrison
- Stepfather: Ian Seymour
- Wife: Rachel McKenna (1995–1998); Waverley Wilson (2002–)
- Sons: Lucas Harrison; Camry Harrison
- Daughters: Tina-Anne Harrison; Celica Harrison; Ranger Harrison; Silvia Harrison
- Grandfathers: Wilson
- Uncles: Ian Harrison
- Aunts: Marilyn Bluck

Nicholas John Harrison is a fictional character on the New Zealand soap opera Shortland Street who was portrayed by Karl Burnett from the show's second episode in 1992 to 2005, making him the original character to stay with the show the longest in one stint. The character, along with wife Waverley, returned for the show's 25th anniversary that aired on 25 May 2017.

== Creation and casting ==
Whilst creating the soap that was to become, Shortland Street, Caterina De Nave decided to write teenagers into the show so as to draw in a younger demographic. It was decided to have two teenagers, one being Stuart Neilson – an articulate homosexual and the other Nick Harrison – a drug taking rebel. The two characters were set to be heart throbs and auditions were undertaken for the roles. Sixteen-year-old Karl Burnett whose only other experience was the 1991 film When Love Comes and high school drama classes won the role. Milan Borich got into the final stages of auditioning but instead landed the role of Nick's best friend in the show's first week. Burnett's portrayal of Nick proved to be greatly different than the spunky rebel that had been envisioned and writers began to develop Nick into a more comedic and clumsy character. This worried producers who were scared that the soaps only heart throb was gay and they requested the character of Stuart also be rewritten to be heterosexual. The character of Nick made his debut in the show's second episode on 26 May 1992. Burnett departed the show temporarily in 2001, taking a "sabbatical". However requiring financial assistance, Burnett agreed to return full-time to the show 9 months later despite believing he never rediscovered his "passion" for acting.

Burnett found Nick developed over time into a "boring" character, believing that new writers were incapable of writing for the previously comedic character. In signing a contract a couple years following his permanent return, Burnett negotiated more humour to be incorporated into Nick, though he never saw this within the scripts and believed the character became increasingly boring instead. In 2005, after 13 years on the show, the character of Nick was axed by producers alongside wife, Waverley Harrison (Claire Chitham). Burnett believed the "boring" nature of his character had resulted in storylines drying up, and that the network would be making large cost-cuts through his salary being cut. The Harrison family made their last appearance on 17 March 2005. Burnett was not surprised at his character's axing and had been ready to move on from the role. Though he was not opposed to returning to the soap for one or two guest appearances, he did not think he would be asked back. Burnett stayed with the show in the role of a boom operator behind the scenes. In 2012, Burnett admitted that he had not been asked to return for the show's 20th anniversary. Following an online campaign and petition to reinstate Nick in 2014, Burnett commented that he was open and willing to return. In honour of the show's 25th anniversary in 2017, Burnett was asked to reprise his role alongside Chitham. The two filmed an appearance for the feature length special which Burnett commented was, "definitely going to be a fun watch". Burnett made his reappearance on 25 May 2017. Burnett agreed to reprise the role for a guest appearance in late 2022 alongside Chitham, attending makeup and costume-fitting. However due to mental health issues, he ultimately pulled out of the return shortly before filming. Burnett's on-screen family appeared onscreen regardless.

== Storylines ==
Badboy Nick was accused of stealing a boat and fell out with best friend, Stuart (Martin Henderson) when their mutual friend Miles Lucas (Hamish MacFarlane) committed suicide and the two struggled to withhold their emotions. Nick started to date punk girl, Serena Hughes (Willa O'Neill) to anger his mother Jenny (Maggie Harper). However the plan backfired when Serena and Jenny got on famously and Nick fell for her. However the two eventually broke up and Nick developed unrequited love for Rachel McKenna (Angela Bloomfield). Nick grew jealous when Rachel got together with Stuart and got in a serious accident when he stole Stuart's motorbike in a fit of rage. Whilst Nick dated a girl called Olivia (Emma Turner), he learned that he may not be Jenny's real son, with the possibility of being swapped at birth with Adam Brady (Jeremy Brennan) arising. Undergoing an identity crisis, Nick nicknamed himself "Slash" and took up smoking. However Adam was soon revealed to be mentally ill and was sent to a psychiatric ward, and Nick realised how much he loved his mum, dropping his bad boy persona. Nick cleaned up his act and developed a crush on new girl, Waverley Wilson (Claire Chitham) after he broke up with Olivia. Waverley used Nick for sex but the two eventually started to legitimately develop feelings.

Waverley had a pregnancy scare which saw Nick nervously propose. He married Rachel in a protest on student loans which upset Waverley to the point where she fled the country. After setting off fireworks, a damaged one hit Nick in the face and temporarily blinded him and in the aftermath, he dated Ramona (Ashleigh Seagar) but they broke up when Nick clumsily misplaced her baby, Lucy. Nick started an awkward fling with Rachel when she was struck by lightning which soon ended when Rachel recovered. Nick dated a woman named Vanessa but when Waverley returned to town, the two finally reconciled. Nick forgave Waverley when she cheated on him but couldn't accept her when she cut his hair without consent. The two broke up. Nick saved good friend Minnie Crozier (Katrina Devine) from entering prostitution and the two entered a relationship however it ended when Nick slapped her in a fit of rage. Nick started to date Angela Weaver (Katherine Hubbard) and she fell pregnant. However Angela was revealed to be terminally ill but decided to go through with the pregnancy. They married in an unofficial ceremony and Angela gave birth to a son they named Lucas (Christopher Preece) shortly before she died.

Nick struggled to accept Lucas but with the help of Rangi (Blair Strang) and Donna (Stephanie Tauevihi), Nick finally felt love for his son. Nick soon realised he still loved Waverley but she felt obliged to Adam (Leighton Cardno) and Nick departed to London with Lucas. When he returned months later, he and Waverley finally reconciled. The two got engaged but on the eve of the wedding Waverley was kidnapped by his ex fiancé Fergus (Paul Ellis). The two finally wed in but the legitimacy of the marriage was put into question when Nick forged the certificate after he misplaced the original. Nick helped Waverley through cancer and she fell pregnant. However Waverley had a miscarriage but soon fell pregnant again. Nick won the local bar in a poker match but was shocked to discover the previous owner Geoff Greenlaw's (Andrew Laing) dead body in the freezer. Waverley gave birth to a daughter that she and Nicknamed Tina-Anne (Libby Reber). Nick grew paranoid when a home invader struck the homes of Ferndale, the family moved to Taranaki to ensure their safety.

Nick and Waverley returned for Chris' 50th birthday and revealed that they had since had 3 more children since Tina-Anne. Arguing over Waverley's wish for Nick to undergo a vasectomy, the couple helped out as Ferndale was hit with a volcanic eruption. The two were shocked to discover that Waverley was again pregnant but came to be happy following wisdom from Marj (Elizabeth McRae) before she died moments later.

While Nick wouldn't appear in 2022 with Waverley and 4 of their kids, he was mentioned as getting Tina-Anne settled in at Lincoln University.

== Character development ==
=== Relationship with Waverley Wilson ===
In 1994, the character of Waverley Wilson (Claire Chitham) was introduced to the soap as a love interest for Nick. Waverley at first used Nick to get to Stuart Neilson (Martin Henderson), but it was not long before something more serious developed. In 1995 the couple had a pregnancy scare and Nick nervously proposed to Waverley before they found out it was a mistake and he retracted his action. Waverley was devastated to learn Nick had married her cousin Rachel (Angela Bloomfield) during a protest on student allowance and she fled the country. Chitham and Burnett got on well, something which benefitted the couples onscreen relationship, Chitham stated, "Karl's lovely. He's very good to work with... I think we've got a really good rapport going – you have to if you're playing a couple on screen." Upon returning after 3 years in 1998, Waverley hoped that Nick had made a substantial change, Chitham stated, "Waverly wants him to have grown up and sorted himself out, have a respectable job and be a man – a suitable man to be her partner and she won't settle for anything less. She sticks to her morals really strongly and that is one of the aspects in which I think she's grown up a lot." Speaking of Nick's attempts to meet Waverleys demands, Chitham said, "He makes an effort to meet her requirements. We get there in the end." The two became engaged but Nick was devastated when Waverley cut his trademark hair whilst they slept and they broke up.

Just over a year later, Nick's partner Angela Weaver (Katherine Hubbard) died, leaving him with the care of their son, Lucas (Joshua Adams). Waverley looked after the baby alongside Rachel. As 2001 came to an end, Nick announced his love to Waverley. Waverley turned him down and Nick left Ferndale for England so that Burnett could take a sabbatical. When he returned, Nick and Waverley finally reconciled and got engaged. The marriage was cancelled however when Waverley's ex fiance, Fergus Kearney (Paul Ellis) kidnapped her on the day of the ceremony. She was rescued however and the two finally married in an episode marked by the return of original characters, Jenny Harrison (Maggie Harper) and Marj Brasch (Elizabeth McRae). The following year Waverley was diagnosed with breast cancer and did not tell Nick. Waverley recovered and soon fell pregnant, giving birth to a daughter, Tina-Anne Harrison (Damikah Chancher) on the shows 3000th episode. A fire at Nick and Wave's bar, 'The Dog's Day Inn', nearly saw an end to Lucas and Tina-Anne, but both were rescued by Wave's cousin Eltham Wilson (Kip Chapman). In 2005, the couple's home was struck by a home invader and an increasingly paranoid Nick mistook Wave for a burglar and shook a gun at her. As a result of their insecurities, the Harrison's left Ferndale for Taranaki.

== Reception ==
During his time on the show, Nick was one of the show's most popular characters and one of the most recognisable faces on New Zealand television. He has also been praised as one of the show's most successful comedic characters. Upon the show's initial screening, the character of Nick received the worst response of the original cast due to his depiction of a typical "Westie" (West Aucklander). However upon the vast character change, fans of the show praised Nick's comedic writing and scenes and he soon became a scene stealer and fan favourite. Michael Galvin (Chris Warner) enjoyed the characters development, stating; "When the show started, people wondered what this creature was all about. Now he's, like, this comic genius – a Buster Keaton who talks, crossed with Bart Simpson. He's just great, so deadpan..." Galvin and Angela Bloomfield (Rachel McKenna) later both went on to name Nick as their favourite character to star on the show. Producer Steven Zanoski listed Nick as one of the best features of the soap, stating: "Every Nick story is fantastic to write, made more so by the reliability of Karl Burnett's performance. It's a case of a character evolving to capitalise on the unexpected qualities of the actor." He went on to say: "Much of the comedy and pathos we got from Nick over 10 years defined the Shortland Street style, setting it apart from other fast-turnaround tele-drama." The New Zealand Woman's Day magazine listed Nick as the 4th best character of the soap's first 25 years.

A 1999 storyline saw Nick incorporate Apple computers into the clinic as part of a new administration scheme. Television New Zealand had not entered into any agreement with Apple and was rather portraying the computers due to their "sexy" looks and for storyline development; a move praised by Apple. However shortly into the storyline's progression, the computers were infected with viruses. Apple was shocked at how their computers were portrayed and confessed that future storylines involving the computers would require consultation so as to provide "more appropriate" scenarios. In 2002, when the actor took a sabbatical from the show, The New Zealand TV Guide ran a 'Bring Back Nick' campaign demanding that the iconic character be reinstated. Throughout 2001 and 2002, Burnett lost 18 kilos by going on a healthy diet. To explain his weight loss on screen, Nick was shown to eat more balanced meals and healthy alternatives replaced junk food in the hospital cafeteria. Health experts praised the show and Burnett for the initiative. The pairing of Nick and Waverley was described as "totally right" and was compared to the marriage of Ken and Deirdre Barlow in Coronation Street.

Nick's exit in 2005 was celebrated by Frances Grant, who labelled the character "gormless" and "boring", comparing him unfavorably to the Coronation Street character Ken Barlow. However following Burnett's appearance on the weight loss show Downsize Me in 2008, Grant criticised the shows writers for axing the character and suggested Burnett's weight loss could have been a potential storyline for Nick. The Edge broadcaster Dom Harvey had been an avid viewer of the soap but following the axing of Nick, refused to watch another episode until he was reinstated, ultimately campaigning for his return 9 years later. In 2006 Galvin campaigned for the return of Nick and named him as a "comic gift" and his favourite character. In 2012, the character was named as one of the standout characters of the show's first 20 years. The storyline that saw Nick marry Rachel and the 2002 marriage of Nick and Waverley, have been voted by fans as two of the show's most iconic moments. In 2016 a stuff.co.nz reporter named Nick as the 5th character he most wanted to return to the show. They believed reuniting Nick and Rachel would "no doubt be a winner".
