= Marj Brasch =

- Shortland Street character
- Portrayed by: Elizabeth McRae
- Duration: 1992–1996, 1998, 2002, 2012, 2017
- First appearance: 25 May 1992
- Last appearance: 25 May 2017
- Introduced by: Caterina De Nave (1992); Simon Bennett (1998); Harriet Crampton (2002); Steven Zanoski (2012); Maxine Fleming (2017)
- Book appearances: Marj's Story – Shortland Street Books (1996)
In-universe information
- Other names: Marj Neilson
- Occupation: Receptionist (1989–1996); Member of the New Zealand Parliament for Ferndale (1996–2005)
- Husband: Tom Neilson (1958–1993); Laurie Brasch (1994–2017)
- Sons: Darryl Neilson; Patrick Neilson; Damien Neilson; Stuart Neilson
- Daughters: Jane Fitzgerald
- Stepdaughters: Sally Brasch; Sarah Brasch; Ruth Brasch
- Grandsons: Robert Neilson
- Granddaughters: Melissa Neilson; Rebecca Stanton
- Aunts: Jean

Marjorie "Marj" Brasch (also Neilson) is a fictional character on the New Zealand soap opera Shortland Street. Being part of the original cast, she was portrayed by Elizabeth McRae from the show's first season in 1992 up until 1996. She returned as a guest character in 1998, 2002, as part of the show's 20th anniversary in May 2012 and again for the show's 25th anniversary in 2017.

Matriarch of the original family unit – the Neilsons, Marj was the mother of four sons; Patrick (Uncredited), Damien (Mark Ferguson), the villainous Darryl (Mark Ferguson) and Stuart (Martin Henderson) alongside a daughter Jane (Katherine McRae). She was staunchly Catholic and often found herself fighting for her beliefs and her family. The character also resonated the archetypical soap opera gossip, something which McRae suggested was integral to the show. Originally married to Tom (Adrian Keeling), Marj soon became a widow and married boyfriend Laurie Brasch (Chic Littlewood) before leaving the show in 1996, to become a politician. She returned in 1998 to aide in the exit of Jenny Harrison (Maggie Harper), briefly in 2002 to attend good friend Nick's (Karl Burnett) wedding, in 2012 to support Rachel McKenna (Angela Bloomfield), and in 2017 for her onscreen death. Throughout Marj's run, she maintained several long lasting character relationships, primarily with; Jenny Harrison, Kirsty Knight (Angela Dotchin) and Rachel McKenna, some of which have had on-lasting effects on archetypical character moulds.

The character was used largely for comedic scenes but as she developed, she was also used for dramatic effect, with numerous storylines being fronted by Marj. She was hugely popular, being named as the most iconic character to feature on the soap of all time.

== Creation and casting ==
One of the goals of creating Shortland Street, was to have strong women as primary characters to counter stereotype the weak and vulnerable women that were often portrayed in dramas at the time. Marj was written as one of the characters to fulfill this role, presenting a strong front at the clinic reception. A family unit was also required for key audience targets, leading to Marj being established with a husband and two children. Elizabeth McRae was cast in the role and was delivered an initial 30 scripts in February 1992, being sceptical that the show would last over a year due to curiosity over how her character could develop over such a long period. She went on to realise the writers craft, stating; "You learn quite quickly that your character can do – anything. You never go up to the writer's and go; 'My character wouldn't do so and so'." Several months into the shows run, the character of Marj's son – Stuart (Martin Henderson) was rewritten to be religious rather than gay in a bid to maintain a heterosexual "heart-throb" for teenage audiences; Marj was also rewritten to emphasise her Catholic nature. She was given another two sons because of this. Henderson was at first "intimidated" acting alongside his screen mother but learned from her acting and professional abilities. Marj made her debut on the shows first ever episode and even spoke the first ever line: "Shortland Street Accident and Emergency Centre!" McRae soon found herself a mentor for the young actors. After the show and the character gained popularity, McRae began to worry that she might not be cast as anything else and decided to quit. Producers decided to write her out in a storyline where she became a politician. They saw this as a fun and unusual write out for a deserving fan favourite character. Marj made her last appearance as a regular character on 15 July 1996.

McRae agreed to reprise the role in 1998 as part of the exit storyline for the character of Marj's best friend Jenny Harrison (Maggie Harper), but ruled out returning full-time to the soap. McRae returned in another guest role in 2002. It was confirmed in May 2012 that Marj would be returning to mark the show's 20th anniversary. Producers decided to bring Marj back after the return of another former receptionist – Yvonne Jeffries (Alison Quigan), with producer Steven Zanoski stating: "With the return of Yvonne to the reception desk it was only a matter of course to have Marj back." Marj's return scenes were directed by McRae's daughter Katherine, who stated; "It was very funny. I thought; 'Should I call her mum?' But as soon as we got on the studio floor Marj popped straight back out. It was instant." McRae enjoyed returning to the character of Marj saying; "They are very well written scenes. They did me proud." She made her single episode reappearance on 25 May 2012. McRae reprised her role for the 25th anniversary in May 2017, for a storyline that saw Marj die. McRae described the scenes as "surreal".

== Storylines ==
Working behind the front desk at Shortland Street clinic since its inception, Marj was introduced as a gossip-fueled face of the reception. She and her husband Tom (Adrian Keeling) were horrified when their teenage son Stuart (Martin Henderson) claimed that he was the father of a baby that had been delivered. It was quickly revealed that Stuart's eldest brother Darryl (Mark Ferguson) was the real father, though Marj never discovered this, Tom had his suspicions. Causing controversy within the clinic by ostracising Jaki Manu (Nancy Brunning) due to an HIV scare, and speculating on Meredith (Stephanie Wilkin) and Hone (Temuera Morrison) dating despite being in relationships, the staff realised Marj was an efficient way to spread information to their colleagues. Marj reported Tom to officials for sleep problems that resulted in a near-crash, leading to the marriage to end. Devastated, she suspected Tom was having an affair with Irene Raynor (Jan Saussey) but when this turned out to be a brief flirtation, and Tom was returned to work, they reconciled and she nursed Tom through his health scares. In late 1992, Marj's illegitimate daughter Jane (Katherine McRae) who she adopted out at birth, made contact, infuriating Tom that the lie had been kept for 30 years. He fled Ferndale and an upset Marj began to date policeman Laurie (Chic Littlewood).

Marj's final scenes saw the character meet future prime ministers – Helen Clark and Jenny Shipley. This was later referred to by a reviewer as the meeting of the 3 "most powerful women" in New Zealand.

Marj and Laurie spent months tracking Tom or a body, to no avail. As 1993 ended he returned having spent time in a cult but succumbed to a heart attack. In her grief Marj reunited with Laurie and moved to his farm. After a scare where Marj was accidentally poisoned by rural chemicals, they realised their love and married in 1994. The two became foster parents to Lulu Chatfield (Meighan Desmond) and Marj was devastated when her son Darryl drowned. Behind the reception desk Marj saw the reality of the Ferndale community, recognising the poor services in town. Much to the amusement of her colleagues she put herself forward to be a city councilor, shocking them all when she won. Advocating for the community whilst still working part-time behind the desk, Marj fell into political scandal when she funded Nick's (Karl Burnett) dodgy cleaning materials business. Soon after, a vacancy opened in the area for the 1996 general election; Marj ran and won the majority vote to sit for Ferndale in the New Zealand parliament, quitting Shortland Street.

Several years later, Marj returned to Ferndale and hired best friend – Jenny Harrison (Maggie Harper) as her personal assistant. She attended the funeral for Tiffany Marinovich (Alison James) before she and Jenny departed to Wellington.

The two returned in 2002 to attend Jenny's son, Nick's wedding to Waverley Wilson (Claire Chitham). Marj felt deeply betrayed when Jenny announced her retirement and the two fell out. It was only through the love of Nick and Waverley that the two finally reconciled. As she again departed Ferndale, Marj offered Jenny's position to Rachel McKenna (Angela Bloomfield), who declined. The following year Marj helped secure Rachel a job in the government, leading to her leaving Ferndale. Marj briefly returned in May 2012 to support Rachel following Chris' (Michael Galvin) arrest for murder.

Marj returned to Ferndale for Chris' 50th birthday but was hospitalised for an aortic aneurysm, leading to Stuart arriving to visit her. Marj revealed that she had retired from politics 12 years previously after winning three consecutive elections. A volcanic eruption saw Marj step in and return to the front desk of the hospital before suffering an angina attack whilst stuck in the elevator. Following words of advice to Nick and Waverley on being parents for the 6th time, Marj fell into cardiac arrest in the hospital reception and died. Chris and Stuart discovered her body and expressed joy that she had died in her "home".

== Character development ==
=== Characterisation ===
Instantly upon introduction, Marj was shown to be a stern Catholic mother busybody, who loved to gossip and cares deeply for her family. She has been described as "bossy, opinionated, a terrible gossip. She was everyone's favourite Aunt, with the flapping mouth and the big heart." Marj has also been described as the "big-hearted office gossip". The character did not mind saying what she thought, including in 1992 when she was openly hostile towards Jaki Manu (Nancy Brunning) who feared she had AIDS. In 1994 Marj was heavily against the hiring of lesbian nurse – Annie Flynn (Rebecca Hobbs) but soon came adjusted to it, with the character saying: "I was very close to a girl once ... I can understand this". McRae enjoyed the characterisation but acknowledged Marj had her flaws, stating; "She stands up for family and is quite perceptive and forgiving. Her Achilles heel is that she can't resist butting in and telling people what they should think or feel." McRae also wanted the character to be relateable, saying; "I don't play Marj to be liked, but I play her to be understood. I think Marj is able to see her own faults at times, and that's one of her saving graces." Upon her return in 2012 it became apparent that Marj's "no nonsense" attitude had not diminished with age when she gave Yvonne Jeffries (Alison Quigan) and Bella Cooper (Amelia Reid) advice on working reception.

Marj was primary comic relief in her initial storylines, so writers decided to introduce drama to the character so that the audience could connect and to further develop the character. This included the storyline where husband Tom went missing and the introduction of Marj's menacing antagonistic son, Darryl. McRae particularly enjoyed acting the comedy scenes, saying: "I really enjoy playing the comedy where Marj gets a bit of authority and goes bananas bossing everyone around." McRae didn't want the character to appear as solely comic relief however, saying; "I don't play the character for everyone to love her. I've seen that in Australian soaps with women of my age. They try to make older women all fuzzy round the edges and that's hopeless." Marj was said to be the "quintessential" soap opera archetype of a gossip. The gossiping was a key point of the character, with the actress stating; "The show's creators realised from the start that the role of in-house gossip is integral to the soap-opera genre" and listing Marj's gossip as a necessary passage of drama between characters. She described Marj's gossiping as "dispersing" information between characters to help run the storylines and the "wheels" of the soap.

=== Kia ora, Shortland Street ===
Marj delivered the first words spoken on Shortland Street, answering the phone at the clinic reception: "Shortland Street accident and emergency centre", though this was often confused with the later more established catch-phrase of the show "Kia ora, Shortland Street". This phrase was actually introduced three years into the shows tenure; on-screen the clinic sought to embrace Te Reo and implemented Maori phrases for reception. The at-times socially conservative Marj was shown to resist the move but soon came round to embracing Te Reo and "mangled the phrase with ... gusto". The use of a Conservative Pakeha woman coming round to appreciating the language was said to help bridge the cultural gap in New Zealand by incorporating te reo Māori. McRae supported the storyline, "It was a great move for Shortland Street to incorporate Māori into the show. I thoroughly agreed with it. I love the idea that we're a visible bi-cultural country." The phrase ultimately became "legendary" with all receptionist characters succeeding Marj uttering the words.

== Reception ==
"I love Liz McRae, and Marj was an example for us in defining what soap was for New Zealand. She pushed the comedy envelope so far, she stretched Marj in any way that was the best way to stretch her, but she never lost the humanity of Marj. She never lost the reality of the character. Even when she was being 'Outrageous Marj', you still felt that she was a real person, and you still loved her.

She was often the voice of disapproval or bigotry. She would be used to represent ordinary New Zealand being a bit hideous, yet she made it understandable – and when she had the revelations and came around to a better way of thinking, it made perfect sense. I think it helped change New Zealand in certain ways."

— Co-star Craig Parker (Guy Warner) on the success of Elizabeth McRae as Marj.

The character received a positive response with a review of the first episode saying the reception desk was; "about the only place where the makers of Shortland Street have got it right". However it took a while for Marj to be won over by the audience, with McRae suggesting that after the character was written with "a bit of comedy and a bit of warmth", she instantly became a fan favourite. McRae understood why viewers related to Marj so well, stating; "I think that Marj is possibly Mrs Middle New Zealand; I think people identify with her as being just like their next door neighbour or an aunty. I suppose she could become a sort of Kiwi icon." McRae was contacted by a political party in 1996 suggesting she run as an electorate MP following scenes where Marj was shown to be political. McRae later reflected on this, "The fact they asked me to stand for Parliament merely because I played Marj was ludicrous". When filming her final scenes at parliament, McRae remembered realising the impact Marj had made by the amount of MP's approaching her for photos. The relationship between Marj and Kirsty Knight (Angela Dotchin) proved memorable to fans due to its comedic nature. Scenes featuring Marj gossiping whilst purchasing from the clinic's food trolley further proved favourable to fans of the show and after being disestablished in the early 2000s, the trolley was reintroduced in 2014 to re-introduce similar scenes.

=== Impact ===
To honour the shows 10th anniversary in May 2002, Michelle Hewitson of The New Zealand Herald voted Marj as the best character to ever appear on the show noting her multiple levels of characterisation and interesting storylines. Hewitson described Marj's best catchphrase as; "Mind your own beeswax." and her silliest scene, being when Marj nearly died when her scarf got caught in the paper shredder, only to be saved by Nick Harrison (Karl Burnett) who was washing the windows outside. McRae herself reflected on how this was one of her favourite storylines and in fact kept the destroyed scarf as a memento for many years. Her "maddest" storyline was decided to be her husband – Tom's (Adrian Keeling) disappearance. TV reviewer, John T. Forde, listed Marj as his second favourite character and highlighted her phrase: "Kia ora, Shortland Street Accident and Emergency centre!" During a speech at the show's 15th anniversary, the Prime Minister Helen Clark, noted the "fun" she had filming Marj's final scenes at parliament. The scene also included Marj meeting National Party minister Jenny Shipley, and blogger Alex Casey described the meeting of Marj, Clark, and Shipley as a "special treat" due to the 3 being the "most powerful women" in New Zealand. Marj was said to deliver many of the "best lines" in the show's 25th anniversary episode. The New Zealand Woman's Day magazine listed Marj as the 13th best character of the soap's first 25 years.

McRae later went on to state that playing Marj was a highlight of her 50-year-long career, saying; "It was quite a privilege to be in that initial cast because it was a breakthrough that there was at last a New Zealand soap opera that wasn't full of Australians or Americans or English." In 2012, the character was named as one of the standout characters of the show's first 20 years. Producer – Steven Zanoski, praised Marj's return in 2012, stating; "The scenes between Rachel and Marj have proved to be the most moving stories we see over a week of moving stories." Marj's return was later named as one of the highlights of the 2012 season. In 2013, Marj's return was named as the 5th best ever character return storyline on the soap by the Shortland Street website in a collated list. The soap's longest serving star, Michael Galvin (Chris Warner) praised and admired McRae for her portrayal of Marj as she taught him to "take the work seriously, but don't take yourself too seriously". In 2016, Marj was named by a stuff.co.nz reporter as the 3rd character they most wanted to return to show. Ricardo Simich expressed his desire for Marj to return for the soap opera's 25th anniversary saying it was a "must" she be reunited with Waverley Harrison. In 2017 stuff.co.nz journalist Fleur Mealing named Marj as the 9th character she most wanted to return for the show's 25th anniversary, citing the potential for Marj to again deliver the first line of the episode.

=== Legacy ===
Analyzing the role of relationships in Shortland Street, researcher Nandi Lakshmanan noted Marj and Laurie for being the only couple on screen in 1995 to not suffer relationship issues or a break-up. She noted this as a successful function of the role of women on the soap. Following the success of Marj's characterisation in the original cast, the character became iconic and an archetype for later characters to come. This archetype consisted of a motherly figure who offered sage advice from behind the desk with her one liners. The character was followed by numerous other similar characters that were equally as popular, including; Moira (Geraldine Brophy), Babara (Annie Whittle) and Yvonne (Alison Quigan). Columnist Fleur Mealing did however note that, "Marj was Shortland Street's first ever receptionist. That coveted position has been held by many different folk since, but no one will ever did it like Marj did." The similarities were referenced on screen in 2008 when a highly drugged Guy Warner (Craig Parker) mistook Yvonne for Marj. Despite Yvonne's storylines being screened to thousands of viewers every night, Quigan still found herself mistaken for Marj by the public, reportedly being constantly reminded that she: "played Marj on Shortland Street." When Amelia Reid was cast in the role of Bella Cooper in 2010, she stated her hope to live up to the reputation of Marj on the front desk. When Jennifer Ludlam (Receptionist Leanne Miller) filmed her first scenes behind the desk, she felt it was an iconic position to hold having previously worked with McRae on stage. Ludlam later reflected on this, saying, "Who doesn't know Marj ... what an icon!" McRae's daughter reflected on the popularity of Marj stating, "Marj became so multi-faceted and so real that many people could relate to her", highlighting her long-standing nature in viewers minds.

=== Death scene response ===
The death scenes of Marj were praised by reviewers. Her final words, "Life's too short and wonderful for regrets" were described by a reviewer on The Spinoff as being "profound and moving". The quote was said to be one of the best of the episode, and the scenes to be a well earned "sentimental closing montage". The song One Day by Opshop featured as a backing track during Marj's death and subsequently reentered the New Zealand iTunes charts. The 25th anniversary episode featuring her death also recorded high ratings of 630,000, receiving praise from the producers and the network. Marj's return and death was noted by The New Zealand TV Guide as one of the show's highlights of the decade.
