= Jenny Harrison (Shortland Street) =

Fictional character on Shortland Street

- Shortland Street character
- Portrayed by: Maggie Harper
- Duration: 1992–1998, 2002
- First appearance: 26 May 1992
- Last appearance: 14 September 2002
- Introduced by: Caterina De Nave (1992); Harriet Crampton (2002)
- Book appearances: Shortland Street books – Nick's story (1996)
In-universe information
- Occupation: Political administrator Business Manager (1997-1998); Manager, Shortland Street Women’s Clinic (1996-1997); Owner & Bar Manager Kennedy's (1995-1996); Personal Assistant
- Father: Wilson
- Husband: Barry Harrison (1975–1983); Ian Seymour (1997–)
- Sons: Nick Harrison
- Grandsons: Lucas Harrison; Camry Harrison
- Granddaughters: Tina-Anne Harrison; Celica Harrison; Ranger Harrison; Silvia Harrison
- Other relatives: Marilyn Bluck

Jennifer Marie Harrisonis a fictional character on the New Zealand soap opera Shortland Street. She was portrayed by Maggie Harper as part of the show's original cast, making her first appearance in the second episode. Harper quit the role in 1998 but reprised the character briefly 4 years later.

Jenny was created as the single mother of teenage rebel, Nick Harrison (Karl Burnett) after surviving an abusive marriage with Nick's father. The personal assistant to the Shortland Street clinic's chief executive officer, Michael McKenna (Paul Gittins), Jenny was the embodiment of the strong and wise matriarch the shows producers wished to portray. Jenny headlined numerous storylines including a secret love affair with Guy Warner (Craig Parker), a secret revealing Nick may not be her biological son, numerous romances, a pregnancy and later abortion, breast cancer, a brief marriage to the villainous Ian Seymour (David Press) and departing the show to work in politics alongside best friend, Marj Brasch (Elizabeth McRae). By the time Jenny departed in 1998, she was the show's longest running character and only one of the two remaining original cast, beside her son Nick.

Jenny was a popular character. Many of Jenny's storyline were notable, including a never-finished story where she developed a cyst and a hugely controversial storyline where she had an abortion.

== Creation and casting ==
Whilst creating the show that was to become Shortland Street, Caterina De Nave set out to pursue many goals, one of which was to have strong powerful women as primary characters to counter stereotype the weak and vulnerable women often portrayed in dramas. De Nave and Television New Zealand also wished for as wide demographics as possible and many measures were set about to ensure the soap would reach a diverse audience. To fulfill this, De Nave created the roles of teenagers such as Nick Harrison, Stuart Neilson and Kirsty Knight to draw in a young audience. Family units were also commonly used in soap operas to sustain a wide variety of demographics in one group of characters and as such, the characters of Nick and Stuart were built around a family unit, with the single mother of Nick's, Jenny, being created to represent single parent families. Jenny was characterised to embody the strong matriarch De Nave wished to portray. Maggie Harper had just started a 4-year course on the natural healing technique, the Feidenkrais method, when she was cast in the role. She was said to bring her own strength and experience to the part. Jenny made her debut on the show's second episode, screened 26 May 1992.

As the nineties progressed, Harper maintained her role and by 1996, was one of only three remaining cast members of the original 16, alongside screen son, Karl Burnett (Nick Harrison) and Angela Dotchin (Kirsty Knight). Dotchin departed two years later, leaving only the Harrison family as the remaining original cast. Several months later, Harper quit the role after falling in love with a man she met at a fancy dress party. Harper was pleased to be in a relationship upon leaving the show due to Jenny's constant thoroughfare of poor romances. The character of Jenny's best friend, Marj Brasch (Elizabeth McRae) was reintroduced to the soap in her final episodes as a means of writing her out. Shortly after quitting Harper realised the extent of how happy she was, stating, "The week I finished I was on my bike cycling away and I thought, 'Oh, I have no lines to learn, how wonderful'." Following Jenny's departure in August 1998, only one original cast member remained on the show, being that of her son Nick. Harper reprised the role in 2002 for her onscreen son's wedding.

== Storylines ==
Jenny was shocked when her former husband Barry Harrison (Alistair Browning) strode back into town but nonetheless, the two reconciled. However Barry hit Jenny and it was soon revealed his constant bashing was the reason for their break up. They again broke up and Barry was even disowned by the couples son, Nick (Karl Burnett). Jenny fell in love with her boss, Michael McKenna (Paul Gittins) and later briefly dated Declan Kennedy (Kevin J. Wilson). Scandal struck when it was revealed Jenny was Guy Warner's (Craig Parker) mistress despite his relationship with Meredith Fleming (Stephanie Wilkin). The clinic staff turned against Jenny but when they realised she was just lonely, she was forgiven. Jenny began to be stalked by a boy named Adam (Jeremy Brennan) who claimed to be her real biological son, though it was never disproven, he was later sectioned due to his deteriorating mental health.

Jenny began to date Johnny Marinovich (Stelios Yiakmis) and the pair bought the local bar ‘‘Kennedy’s’’ from Alex McKenna (Liddy Holloway). In the 1994 cliffhanger, Jenny released she was pregnant but early in the new year she terminated the pregnancy. Jenny was devastated when Michael sold the management contract of the clinic to Julia Thornton (Elizabeth Hawthorne) and then diagnosed with breast cancer, and all the while Johnny was cheating on her with his ex-wife Ellen Crozier (Robyn Malcolm). Jenny's cancer went into remission and she left Johnny and took up with Ian Seymour (David Press). Johnny sold his shares of Kennedy’s to Jenny, who in turn sold the bar back to Alex. Cashed up and with a new lease on life, Jenny opened a dedicated Women’s Health Clinic within Shortland Street. In May 1997, Clinic Director David Kearney decided to fold the Women’s Clinic into Shortland Street’s main clinic operations and offered Jenny the role of Business Director - the position she longed for along when working underneath Michael.

Following a brief kiss when Michael returned to Ferndale, Jenny and Ian eloped but broke up when his true antagonistic nature was unveiled after he attempted to drown Kirsty (Angela Dotchin). News later came that Ian had died but Nick discovered he had in fact faked his death and Jenny called the police on him when he tried to kill Nick. Jenny became increasingly disillusioned with the health system and the return of her best friend Marj (Elizabeth McRae) saw Jenny offered a job in politics. She accepted and left Ferndale. Jenny and Marj returned 4 years later to attend Nick's marriage to Waverley Wilson (Claire Chitham). Their friendship broke up when Jenny announced her resignation however Nick talked them through it and the two departed after the ceremony.

== Reception ==
The character of Jenny Harrison was named as a "favourite" to Shortland Street viewers. Harper herself did not enjoy playing Jenny when the soap began, but influenced the characters development with her own personality, she stated, "At first, I thought Jenny was a bit of a victim . They've made her a stronger character now. I got sick of her being so passive. It was annoying to play and I don't think she was a good role model, either." Jenny's abortion in 1995 was seen as highly controversial and several complaints were made to the Broadcasting Standards Authority, though none were upheld. A storyline featuring Jenny developing a cyst was introduced to the soap but never continued due to the writers effectively forgetting about it. This later became a codename, "Jenny's cyst", for forgotten or misplaced storylines occurring in the soap. 2011 advertisements for repeats of the soap's original episodes, noted Jenny as one of the featured characters to entice an audience.
