= Fergus Kearney =

- Shortland Street character
- Portrayed by: Paul Ellis
- Duration: 1995–2002
- First appearance: 6 December 1995; Episode 908
- Last appearance: 4 September 2002
- Introduced by: Gavin Strawhan (1995); Simon Bennett (1997, 1998); Harriet Crampton (2002)
In-universe information
- Other names: David Kearney, (birth name) Davey (alias/childhood nickname)^{1}
- Occupation: Manager of the Dogs Day Inn (2000–01)
- Father: David Kearney
- Mother: Isobel Kearney
- Stepmother: Ellen Crozier
- Brothers: Sean Kearney
- Half-brothers: Bradley Kearney
- Half-sisters: Rose Crozier-Kearney
- Aunts: Liz Stokes
- First cousins: Anne Stokes; Robert Stokes

David Fergus^{2} Kearney^{3} is a fictional character on the New Zealand soap opera Shortland Street who was portrayed by Paul Ellis for numerous recurring stints from 1995 to 1999 before becoming a regular character until 2001. The character returned briefly in 2002.

Fergus arrived to New Zealand screens in 1995 as a homeless teenager who got help from Guy Warner (Craig Parker). Producers were impressed by Ellis and the role was rewritten so that he was the son of established character – David Kearney (Peter Elliott) and he was reintroduced several months later. Although at first he was an antagonistic badboy, Fergus developed into a character "with a heart". His story lines were at times, highly topical, these included ethical scenarios such as: homelessness, the diagnosis of Attention deficit hyperactivity disorder, Neo-Nazi cultism and illegal immigration. He had two long running romances including a teenage relationship with step sister Minnie Crozier (Katrina Devine) and an engagement to Waverley Wilson (Claire Chitham), that resulted in his exit from the soap.

Fergus has since gone down as a memorable character with his exit timed alongside the soaps infamous 2001 revamp that saw the axing of 14 characters. His romance storyline with Waverley and the couple's ill fated wedding have gone down as iconic in the soap's history, being voted by fans as one of the top 20 moments.

== Creation and casting ==
Paul Ellis auditioned for Shortland Street at the age of 18 but did not win the part. However the casting directors took a liking to Ellis and hired him as a two-week role of Fergus; a homeless bad boy who was in a group of squatters Guy Warner helped. After the stint ended, producers were impressed by Ellis' interpretation of the character and rewrote the character so that he was the son of clinic CEO David Kearney. Ellis was signed to a recurring basis and returned several months later. In 1998, Ellis became a regular cast member. In 2000 Ellis made headlines when it was suggested he was axed by Shortland Street producers. Ellis later spoke out against the rumours and stated it was his wish to leave the show after he stopped learning about acting while appearing.

== Storylines ==
Guy Warner (Craig Parker) started helping out homeless children in 1995, one of which was the teenaged thief, Fergus. When he tried to rob the clinic with his friend Dominique Coombes (Jay Saussey), he was hit over the head by Emily Devine (Michaela Rooney) and briefly hospitalized. He reappeared months later when he took the virginity of 15-year-old Minnie Crozier (Katrina Devine). Later, Fergus was caught trying to sneak into Minnie's room by Minnie's mother Ellen (Robyn Malcolm) and step father David (Peter Elliott). It was then revealed that Fergus was David's son Davey who ran away many years ago. Fergus' auntie Liz (Irene Wood) started to look after Fergus, only for him to burn her house down and get put into juvenile detention. Fergus was released in 1997 and got involved in a Neo Nazi cult alongside Minnie. Fergus got beaten and nearly died at the hands of the cult, causing him to flee Ferndale. However he returned in 1998 and kidnapped his half brother Bradley (Joseph Gloonan) after he was refused to be looked after by his father – Johnny Marinovich (Stelios Yiakmis).

In 1999 Fergus came under suspicion of assaulting Minnie's boyfriend Oscar Henry (Christopher Brown) and he and Minnie reunited in the aftermath. Fergus cheated on her however and purchased the local bar in 2000 before he started to date Waverley Wilson (Claire Chitham) amongst speculation he was a drug dealer. The two got engaged and to make money for the wedding, Fergus became involved in an illegal immigration scam. On his wedding day, police came to arrest him at the altar and he fled Ferndale, leaving a devastated Waverley behind him. He returned and apologized to Waverley before fleeing police yet again. In 2002 Fergus returned when he kidnapped Waverley as she was about to marry Nick Harrison (Karl Burnett). He attempted to reconcile with her but to no avail. After giving his blessing, Fergus escaped police with the help of his friends.

== Reception ==
Fergus remains known for his badboy ways and iconic storylines, mainly the storyline that saw Fergus ditch Waverley at the altar after running from the police. The teenage group that consisted of Fergus, Minnie, Rachel and Nick became a series of archetypes and started a long tradition of "hip, young things". Ellis himself found the storyline that saw Fergus accused of attempting to murder Oscar Henry as one of the character's most iconic moments. Fergus' kidnap of Waverley in 2002 was voted by fans as one of the shows most iconic moments.
