= Minnie Crozier =

- Shortland Street character
- Portrayed by: Katrina Devine
- Duration: 1994–2001
- First appearance: 5 April 1994; Episode 486
- Last appearance: 3 February 2001
- Introduced by: Tony Holden
- Book appearances: Nick's Story - Shortland Street Books (1996)
In-universe information
- Occupation: Receptionist
- Father: Ryan Birch
- Mother: Ellen Crozier
- Stepfather: Johnny Marinovich; David Kearney
- Half-sisters: Rose Crozier-Kearney
- Grandmothers: Glenys Crozier
- Aunts: Carla Crozier

Minnie Crozier is a fictional character on the New Zealand soap opera Shortland Street, who was portrayed by Katrina Devine from her first appearance in 1994 as part of the Crozier family unit until 2001 when the character was axed as part of a large cast overhaul.

== Creation and casting ==
Katrina Devine was cast in the role at the age of 14 and never imagined just how central Minnie would become in following years. After appearing on the show for 6 years, it was announced in 2000 the character was axed and would be making her last appearance in early 2001. The cause was later revealed as a show revamp which would see the tone more suited towards working class characters.

== Storylines ==
Minnie arrived to Ferndale with her mother Ellen Crozier (Robyn Malcolm) and stepfather Johnny Marinovich (Stelio Yiakmis) and was devastated when the two separated. She developed a crush on James Thornton (Chris Dykzeul) but nothing came of it. Minnie met her real father Ryan Birch (Robert Harte) and was shocked when she learned she was the product of rape. She grew close to Harry Martin (Dean O'Gorman) and soon lost her virginity to her streetkid stepbrother Fergus Kearney (Paul Ellis). After taking up Shakespeare acting, Minnie was nearly raped by her teacher and ended up getting him fired. Minnie was disgusted in Johnny when he didn't get back together with Ellen and she briefly dated a Neo Nazi leader in retaliation.

Following the death of her sister Rose (Georgia Bishop), Minnie dated Oscar Henry (Christopher Brown) but the two broke up when he started to control all aspects of her life. This resulted in Oscar blackmailing and raping Minnie. As the year ended, Oscar was found bludgeoned but alive and Minnie was the chief suspect. The aftermath of the rape and the ordeal of being suspects drew Fergus back to Minnie but the two broke up once and for all when he cheated on her. Minnie started to use men and briefly became a prostitute. Good friend Nick Harrison (Karl Burnett) helped her out of the hole she'd dug and the two briefly dated. Minnie met Waverley's (Claire Chitham) brother Stratford (Antony Starr) and fell in love. She ditched the big smoke and the two left to live on a farm. A few years later Eltham Wilson (Kip Chapman) stated that Minnie and Stratford were very much still together though were in the midst of a massive argument.

== Reception ==
Minnie's romances were known for their bad luck, with the character dating a neo-nazi, being raped and going after a gay chemist. Devine won the "Best Supporting Actress" award in the 1998 New Zealand Television Awards for her portrayal of Minnie throughout the rape storyline. Following the departure of Kirsty Knight (Angela Dotchin), Minnie received the label of being her replacement, something which annoyed Devine. Shortly before being axed from the show, Minnie was criticized for being "plain". When fans learned of the axing, they hoped the character would leave unharmed. In 2012, the character was named as one of the standout characters of the show's first 20 years.
