= List of Shortland Street characters introduced in 1993 =

The following is a list of characters that first appeared in the New Zealand soap opera Shortland Street in 1993, by order of first appearance.

== Rachel McKenna ==
Rachel McKenna was the spoilt teenage daughter of CEO - Michael (Paul Gittins) and Alex McKenna (Liddy Holloway). She arrived in early 1993 as part of the McKenna family unit and has been portrayed by Angela Bloomfield for numerous stints.

== Leonard Dodds ==
Dr. Leonard Rossi-Dodds
- Shortland Street character
- Portrayed by: Marton Csokas
- Duration: 1993–1995
- First appearance: 21 January 1993; Episode 174
- Last appearance: 20 January 1995; Episode 680
- Introduced by: Brian Lenanne (1993); Tony Holden (1994)
In-universe information
- Occupation: Owner of Stromboli Cafeteria; Doctor
- Father: Keith Dodds
- Mother: Margaret Dodds
- Brothers: Nigel Dodds
- Sisters: Melody Dodds
- Wife: Gina Rossi (1993—)
- Sons: Leonardo Rossi-Dodds

Dr. Leonard Ralph Carlton Rossi-Dodds was the love interest and eventual husband to Gina Rossi (Josephine Davison). He arrived as the eccentric and clumsy new doctor in early 1993 and soon started to date the equally eccentric - Gina. However Leonard soon left to pursue research down South, and when he returned, was shocked Gina had moved on to Hone Ropata (Temuera Morrison). Leonard was hired as a permanent staff member at the clinic following Chris Warner’s sudden departure to Europe. After a brief flirtation with Meredith, Leonard eventually found a home with Kirsty Knight (Angela Dotchin) and Stuart Neilson (Martin Henderson).

The two reconciled and were married, something Leonard's best man and best friend - Lionel Skeggins (John Leigh) nearly put an end to. Over the summer Leonard began a clinical research project on the benefits of Mānuka honey. The couple bought a houseboat and after Leonard recovered from his sea sickness, the two tried for children. Gina became obsessed with becoming pregnant, and soon feared that Leonard was impotent however tests revealed he was not the problem. Angry over being the subject of office gossip, Leonard missed the signs that Gina was suffering from an ectopic pregnancy. This led to a crisis of confidence and a shift to full time focus on research. Once his paper on the honey trial was published in The Lancet, Leonard soon received an offer for a research position at UCLA. Gina and Leonard depart in March 1994 for what was supposed to be a six month appointment in California.

The Rossi-Dodds returned later in the year as best man and bridesmaid to Lionel and Kirsty. Whilst in California, Gina had been cast in a soap opera. With her acting career taking off, the couple decided to sell their assets in Ferndale and committed permanently to living in America and left in early 1995. In late 1995 it was announced Gina had given birth to a boy named Leonardo.

The character has been named as iconic.

== Alex McKenna ==
Alex McKenna
- Shortland Street character
- Portrayed by: Liddy Holloway
- Duration: 1993–1995, 1996, 2002
- First appearance: 26 April 1993
- Last appearance: 1 May 2002
- Introduced by: Brian Lenanne (1993); Simon Bennett (1996); Harriet Crampton (2002)
In-universe information
- Occupation: Owner of Kennedy's bar (1993–96)
- Father: Albert King
- Sisters: Trish Wilson
- Husband: Michael McKenna (until 1999)
- Sons: Jonathon McKenna
- Daughters: Rachel McKenna
- Nephews: Stratford Wilson
- Nieces: Waverley Harrison; Amberley Wilson

Alexandra "Alex" McKenna (previously King) was the wife of Michael McKenna (Paul Gittins) who was portrayed by Liddy Holloway from 1993 until 1995 and again for a guest roles in 1996 and 2002. Liddy Holloway, who had previously been a writer for the show, was cast as the matriarch of the new family unit, the McKennas. Paul Gittins who portrayed Alex's husband, Michael, would jokingly accuse Holloway of giving her character the best lines of the two.

=== Storylines ===
Alex arrived in early 1993 and instantly got under the skin of estranged husband - Michael McKenna (Paul Gittins). Alex had a brief fling with 17-year-old Stuart Neilson (Martin Henderson) but fell back in love with Michael and the two renewed their vows. In 1994 she purchased "Kennedys" bar and whilst managing it, had a brief affair with Greg Feeney (Tim Balme). Sensing Michael was also having an affair, Alex pressures Michael to give her plastic surgery as a birthday present, and as a result of a forged prescription interacting with the anaesthetic, fell into a coma. Michael was accused of trying to murder his wife but their daughter - Rachel (Angela Bloomfield) unveiled the truth. Alex awoke from the coma, and went on a Caribbean cruise with Michael to recover. However it was soon revealed that Alex had been left with some brain damage that resulted in her struggling to maintain her emotions and make logical decisions during peak times of stress. Returning to work, she partnered with Sam Aleni (Rene Naufahu) to have Kennedys operate as the nightclub “Insomnia” after dinner service. Worried about people getting into the club without paying the cover charge, Alex decided to padlock the fire escape from the outside. When a fire occurs in the club, the padlocked exit nearly kills many attendees. Alex was blackmailed over the fire and the stress resulted in Michael having Alex committed to a psychiatric clinic. Alex leaves Michael due to his lack of support and belief in her, however the pair reconciled after Michael has a heart attack at Christmas time.

The couple left Ferndale for the country side in 1995. However Alex returned the following year and announced the marriage was over. She continued to run the bar and took up with the much younger - Cameron Scott (Glen Drake). However they broke up and Alex gave the bar to Rachel so that she could attempt a reconciliation with Michael.

Two years later, Michael reported to Rachel that Alex had died whilst overseas from illness. In 2002 Rachel was shocked when Alex returned to her life and revealed she had faked her death in a ploy to escape her family. However it soon turned out Alex wanted Rachel's boyfriend - Chris' (Michael Galvin) money to create a new identity and she was sent packing. In both 2009 and 2011 it was stated that Alex had died.

== Ana Aleni ==
Mrs. Aleni
- Shortland Street character
- Portrayed by: Adele Paris
- Duration: 1993–94, 1996, 2014
- First appearance: 22 April 1993; Episode 239
- Last appearance: 1 May 2014
- Introduced by: Brian Lenanne (1993); Gavin Strawhan (1994); Simon Bennett (1996, 2014)
In-universe information
- Sons: Sam Aleni; Nat Aleni
- Granddaughters: Honour Aleni

Ana Aleni née Tali (credited as Mrs. Aleni in her nineties appearances) appeared in a recurring role for several years, portrayed by Adele Paris. She first appeared in 1993 when her son Sam Aleni (Rene Naufahu) struggled with the truth he had defied his fate and had sex before marriage. Ana tried to recover her youngest son Nat (Joe Naufahu) from Sam's flat after he ran away from home. However, with help from Sam, she decided it was best he stayed. She opposed Sam's relationship to the Tongan TP (Elizabeth Skeen) but following their marriage, came to appreciate her. In 1994 she attended TP's memorial service following her death. In 1996 Ana tried to set Sam up with a family friend named Malia, but it soon became apparent to all that Sam was still not ready after the death of his wife. Ana visited Ferndale in 2014 and made it clear she disproved of Sam's young girlfriend Emma Franklin (Amy Usherwood) due to her belief Sam was still struggling with the death of both TP and his second wife, Alise.

== Kim Furious ==
Kim Furious
- Shortland Street character
- Portrayed by: Sassy Acorn
- First appearance: 4 March 1993
- Last appearance: 23 May 1993
- Introduced by: Brian Lenanne
In-universe information
- Occupation: Rock Star

Kim Furious was a rock star who went into Shortland Street for minor surgery. Nick had a crush on her, and when he heard she was at the clinic, snuck into her room a few times to try to meet her. The two became friends, and Kim would eventually give Nick a kiss before she departed.

== Jamie Forrest ==
Jamie Forrest was the show's first openly gay character and eventual boyfriend of Jonathon McKenna (Kieren Hutchison).

== Jo Jordan ==
Joanna Jordan
- Shortland Street character
- Portrayed by: Greer Robson
- Duration: 1993–1994
- First appearance: 11 May 1993; Episode 251
- Last appearance: 19 September 1994; Episode 606
- Introduced by: Brian Lenanne
In-universe information
- Occupation: Nurse
- Mother: Louise Jordan
- Brothers: Mark Jordan

Joanna Jordan was the innocent young nurse who was portrayed by Greer Robson from 1993 to 1994. As the clinic expanded in early 1993, additional nursing staff were needed to be hired urgently. Recent graduate Jo seemed like an odd choice until it was accidentally revealed that she was a family friend of Director of Nursing Carrie Burton (Lisa Crittenden).

Desperate to escape from her turbulent home life caused by her mentally unstable mother and tearaway brother Mark, Jo moves into Alison’s old room at Steve (Andrew Binns) and Sam Aleni’s (Rene Naufahu) house. At first Jo had a major crush on Steve but following a series of misunderstanding and poor timing, the two became good friends instead. Jo was soon being manipulated and groomed by the new Director of Nursing Paul Churchill (Simon Prast). Paul’s behaviour continued to escalate until an incident in the supply closest which led to Jo making a sexual harassment complaint to both the clinic and the Human Rights Commission. Paul was fired from the clinic, however maintained a teaching role at the local polytechnic institute.

Having grown tired of Steve’s antics as a landlord, Jo moved into the spare room at Kirsty Knight (Angela Dotchin) and Stuart Neilson’s share-house just before Christmas. Jo grew close to Stuart (Martin Henderson) after her brother was in a car crash, and start to date in the new year. Stuart’s venture into property development put a strain on the relationship, and Jo found herself developing a plutonic relationship with Chris Warner (Michael Galvin). Stuart misinterpreted the friendship, in part due to Steve believing the two were having an affair and telling Stuart as much, and pair broke up after Gina and Leonard’s farewell party - their breakup fight interrupted with the news of a car crash that resulted in Steve and TP’s death. Jo soon learned that she was catalyst for the argument between Chris and Steve that caused the car crash. Stuart and Jo get back together following Steve and TP’s funeral.

In February, the Human Rights Commission commenced mediation regarding Jo’s complaint about Paul. This resulted in Paul returning back into her life as he tried to manipulate Jo into dropping her complaint, claiming that he had changed due to counselling and his wife’s pregnancy. Jo soon saw through the lies and met with the mediator. Based on the strength of Jo and Carmen’s testimony, the mediator ruled in Jo’s favour resulting in Paul losing his employment at the polytechnic. By May the clinic was under new management and Paul was brought in as a Nursing Consultant to act as an interface between the nursing staff and management consultant Dr Ethan Gill, however was soon arrested for assaulting sex workers.

When old nursing school friend Rebecca joined the ambulance service based out of the clinic, Jo invited her to move into the share-house. However, Stuart had recently developed feelings for Rebecca resulting in Jo dumping Stuart once and for all. Jo found conflict with Kirsty’s boyfriend Greg Feeney (Tim Balme) when he moved into their home and used Chris to fuel his drug dealing business. When Kirsty went out of town for two weeks, Jo and Greg developed feelings for each other. When Kirsty returned, the police start investigating Greg’s involvement with a spate of drug thefts from the clinic and local pharmacies, Greg fled town but promised to return for Jo. Jo confessed her feelings to Kirsty, and despite warnings of Greg’s true nature from many of the clinic staff, Jo resigned mid-shift the day after Greg returned, and rode away together much to the shock of all the staff.

== Declan Kennedy ==
Declan Kennedy
- Shortland Street character
- Portrayed by: Kevin J. Wilson
- Duration: 1993
- First appearance: 28 April 1993; Episode 243
- Last appearance: 5 November 1993; Episode 380
- Introduced by: Brian Lenanne
In-universe information
- Occupation: Manager of Kennedy's (1993) personal trainer
- Wife: Carrie Burton (1993)
- Sons: Steve Mills; Kieran Kennedy
- Daughters: Jessica Kennedy

Declan Kennedy arrived in mid-1993 and quickly caught the attention of Jenny Harrison (Maggie Harper), who he trained at the gym.Steve Mills (Andrew Binns) was reluctant to the newcomer and revealed to the other staff that Declan was his father. Steve blamed Declan for the suicide of his mother but the two eventually patched things up. Declan quickly becomes an enemy of Marj Neilson (Elizabeth McRae) when he purchased the Neilson family home, renovated it, and then flipped it for profit. Jenny was upset when Declan chose Carrie (Lisa Crittenden) over her and Declan married Carrie in Las Vegas. Upon their return, Declan purchased a local building and renovated it into a bar for he and Carrie to help bring in some extra money for their family and became the manager, hiring several staff related to the clinic. When Carrie gave birth to her three children, Declan offered little support and started to appear withdrawn. It soon turned out he had attempted a bank robbery but it had gone terribly wrong. Kirsty reported Declan to the Police resulting his arrest and leaving Carrie and the kids lives in danger from his associates. Declan is held on remand, whilst Carrie and children to flee her sister’s home in Adelaide, South Australia. In February 1994, in the lead up to his trial date, Declan manages to escape custody and sends a package to Steve explaining that by the time the parcel is received he would be out of the country, and enclosed a locket that once belonged to Steve’s mother.

== Carmen Roberts ==
Carmen Roberts
- Portrayed by: Theresa Healey
- Duration: 1993–1995
- First appearance: 3 May 1993; Episode 246
- Last appearance: 25 December 1995
- Introduced by: Brian Lenanne
In-universe information
- Occupation: Nurse at Shortland Street Hospital (1993–95); Prostitute (until 1991)
- Father: Vic Roberts
- Mother: Pauline Roberts
- Daughters: Tuesday Warner

Carmen Roberts first appeared in a guest stint in mid-1993 before returning several months later as a core character. Carmen arrived as a new nurse but when her addiction to prescription pills came to light, she was fired. She returned months later completely rehabilitated but new Director of Nursing - Paul Churchill (Simon Prast) soon recognised her as a prostitute and used this as blackmail to stop her from interfering with his manipulation of Jo Jordan (Greer Robson). When Paul is fired, he sent a poison pen letter to the clinic director revealing her past. This revelation soon came in handy when Guy Warner (Craig Parker) wanted McKenna’s approval to run an outreach program for sex workers.

In 1994, more of Carmen’s past came to light with the arrival of her step-brother Greg Feeney (Tim Balme) and assisted him in withdrawing from a drug addiction cold turkey at her home. The detox comes at the cost of her flat, and soon moved into Steve’s (Andrew Binns) share house. Not long after moving in, flatmates Steve and TP die in a car accident, and Carmen was on hand to support the now widow Sam Aleni (Rene Naufahu). However this meant that after months of flirting, had to start their Carmen and Guy their tumultuous relationship on the down low with Guy sneaking into her room at night as to not upset Sam. When Carmen innocently claimed a dead patient's lottery ticket, she discovered she had won $250,000 and guiltily spent some of it before funding the construction of a memorial to Steve and TP. The remaining funds were nearly lost in a dodgy development deal overseen by Stuart Neilson (Martin Henderson). Carmen used a significant part of the money to buy into the clinic when it adopted a cooperative model, and paid for a patient to get a liver transplant in Australia. When Paul returned to the clinic as Nursing Consultant, Carmen discovered that Paul had been behind an increasingly violent series of attacks on sex workers and had him arrested. With the turnover of nursing staff resulted in Carmen being one of the most experienced team members, Director of Nursing Ellen Crozier (Robyn Malcolm) sent her off for leadership training and became a mentor to recent recruits Otis and Rebecca. Guy tracked down Carmen’s ailing father Vic Roberts in late 1994, and was initially reluctant to interact with him much to the judgement of the clinic’s staff. Eventually Vic’s true motivation of wanting Carmen’s money was revealed and Guy paid Vic off to leave Ferndale forever.

In 1995, following a bout of food poisoning Carmen discovered she was pregnant and in October gave birth to Tuesday Warner (Kelly Tate) amidst a massive storm. In December a truck ploughed through the clinic reception and Carmen received what appeared to be minor bruising. However, later Carmen collapsed and died, having developed a brain hemorrhage.

Carmen was very popular amongst the public and was openly mourned upon her death. In 2012, Carmen's death was voted by fans as one of the show's most iconic moments.

== Amanda Warner ==
Amanda Warner
- Shortland Street character
- Portrayed by: Stephanie Jack (1993); Marissa Stott (2005)
- Duration: 1993, 2005
- First appearance: 21 June 1993
- Last appearance: 12 October 2005
- Introduced by: Brian Lenanne (1993); Jason Daniel (2005)
In-universe information
- Father: Sir Bruce Warner
- Mother: Margot, Lady Warner
- Brothers: Chris Warner
- Half-brothers: Guy Warner
- Uncles: Desmond Worthington; Garth Worthington
- Aunts: Cecile Worthington
- Nephews: Finn Warner; Frank Warner; Phoenix Warner; Harry Warner; James Warner
- Nieces: Sass Warner; Tuesday Warner; Kelly Piper (possibly); Trinity Kwan
- First cousins: Isaac Worthington

Amanda Warner was the disabled twin sister of Chris Warner (Michael Galvin). The Warners had grown up believing Amanda had died at birth. However, Guy (Craig Parker) discovered in 1993 that Bruce Warner (Ken Blackburn) had covered up her birth in fear of the shame she would bring to the family. Chris initially struggled to accept his sister but within weeks had found her a place at the hospital to stay. However, it was clear she needed full-time nursing and was sent overseas.

Amanda returned in 2005 when her carer, Liam Todd (Campbell Cooley) kidnapped her from her hospital and took her to Chris and his wife Toni (Laura Hill) in an attempt to show them she was more than a vegetable. Chris soon became convinced when Amanda touched him but Toni believed Liam had more sinister plans and the two discovered Liam had spent time in a psychiatric ward. Chris and Toni eventually decided to have Amanda put into a local home but surprised all by allowing Liam visiting rights. In 2007 Guy, Chris, Toni, Harry (Henry Williams) and Tuesday (Olivia Tennet) visited Amanda and took her for a picnic.

== Laurie Brasch ==
Laurie Brasch
- Shortland Street character
- Portrayed by: Chic Littlewood
- Duration: 1993–1996
- First appearance: 15 July 1993
- Last appearance: 15 July 1996
- Introduced by: Brian Lenanne
- Book appearances: Marj's Story - Shortland Street Books (1996)
In-universe information
- Occupation: Policeman
- Brothers: John Brasch
- Wife: Marj Neilson (1994–2017)
- Daughters: Sally Brasch; Sarah Brasch; Ruth Brasch
- Stepsons: Darryl Neilson; Damien Neilson; Patrick Neilson; Stuart Neilson
- Stepdaughters: Jane Fitzgerald

Laurie Brasch appeared in guest and recurring roles for 3 year played by Chic Littlewood. Laurie first showed up looking for information regarding an associate of Declan Kennedy's (Kevin J. Wilson) named Don Bligh (Michael Mizrahi) being murdered. Laurie would end up becoming close to Marj (Elizabeth McRae), bonding over their love of gardening and the two would begin to date. As time went on, the two fell in love. However Tom returned and Marj's son Darryl (Mark Ferguson) tried to scare Laurie off. Tom had a fatal heart attack, with his will preventing any money to be given if Marj was unfaithful. She broke it off with Laurie and fell into a grief-ridden state. Nick Harrison (Karl Burnett) realised Marj was lonely and surprised her by organising a reconciliation with Laurie on New Years Eve. The two moved to Laurie's family farm which lead to Marj suffering from accidental poisoning from weed killer. The resulting worry pushed Laurie to propose to Marj but he was devastatingly diagnosed with a brain tumour. The two followed through with an engagement following Laurie's recovery but Marj struggled to comprehend Laurie's Jewish faith to her strong Catholic beliefs and the opposition of his daughter Ruth (Joanna Briant). Ultimately the two wed in a ceremony combining both traditions. In 1995 Marj and Laurie fostered a daughter, Lulu (Meighan Desmond) after she was abused by her father. Laurie retired from the police force and took up security work at the clinic. He was stood down when a young homeless boy, Fergus (Paul Ellis) was seriously injured under his watch though he was cleared when Emily Devine (Michaela Rooney) confessed. In December a truck crashed through the clinic and Laurie helped the survivors but suffered a huge panic attack, leading to the end of his career. In 1996 Laurie departed with Marj to move closer to her job in Wellington.

== Te Aniwa Ryan ==
Te Aniwa Ryan
- Shortland Street character
- Portrayed by: Moana Maniapoto-Jackson
- Duration: 1993–1994
- First appearance: 20 August 1993
- Last appearance: June 1994
- Introduced by: Brian Lenanne
In-universe information
- Brothers: Ricky Ryan

Dr. Te Aniwa Ryan first appeared in mid-1993. She was up against Hone Ropata (Temuera Morrison) in a televised debate and it was clear they had largely differing opinions. Hone began to get stalked but it turned out to be Te Aniwa, desperate to express her love. The two began a relationship though it was on the rocks when Hone encouraged Te Aniwa's brother to continue boxing. The two broke up when Te Aniwa discovered Hone had cheated on her with Hilary Sturgess (Susan Brady).

== Shane Raskin ==
Shane Raskin
- Shortland Street character
- Portrayed by: Richard Hanna
- Duration: 1993–1994
- First appearance: 1 September 1993
- Last appearance: 1 January 1994
- Introduced by: Brian Lenanne

Dr Shane Raskin was the rich, specialist boyfriend of Kirsty Knight (Angela Dotchin). The two dated for several months before Kirsty broke up with Shane on New Year’s Eve. Kirsty struggled to hold her own financially in the relationship, determined not to be a kept woman but not able to keep up with Shane’s lifestyle. After Christmas, Shane revealed he had been offered a two year contract in Hong Kong and offered Kirsty the opportunity to come with him, initially as his PA, and after some encouragement from Gina as his wife. Uninspired by Shane’s logic behind the proposal, as it was more for convenience for immigration purposes than for love, Kirsty dumps Shane resulting in argument at the clinic’s reception on New Year’s Eve.

Shane was introduced as a visiting obstetrician consultant to the clinic as part of the exit storyline of former colleague Meredith Fleming. Whilst initially butting heads with Meredith over the treatment of a pregnant cancer patient, Shane challenged Meredith to want more from her career. At Meredith’s farewell party, Shane was on hand to help deliver Director of Nursing Carrie Burton’s triplets.

== Nat Aleni ==
Nat Aleni
- Shortland Street character
- Portrayed by: Joe Naufahu
- Duration: 1993–1994
- First appearance: 10 September 1993; Episode 340
- Last appearance: 30 March 1994; Episode 483
- Introduced by: Brian Lenanne
In-universe information
- Mother: Ana Aleni
- Brothers: Sam Aleni
- Nieces: Honour Aleni

Nat Aleni was the gang affiliated teenage brother of Sam Aleni (Rene Naufahu). Sam did not realize until it was too late how serious the problem between Tongan and Samoan gangs were and Nat became involved in gang life. Nat's best friend Willy was murdered by the Tongan gangs and Nat promised to end his affiliations. T.P (Elizabth Skeen) struck a deal with Nat to help into a hospitality career if he completed his schooling, and true to her word got Nat a kitchen hand position at her workplace, the local bistro Kennedy’s, upon graduation. Nat helped Jamie Forrest (Karl Urban) in his attempt to bring together Sam and T.P. and later attended their wedding. Nat was instrumental in getting Sam to reconcile with their family in the lead up to T.P's funeral, and assisted Sam in delivering the eulogy.

== TP Aleni ==
TP Aleni
- Shortland Street character
- Portrayed by: Elizabeth Skeen
- Duration: 1993–1994
- First appearance: 1 September 1993; Episode 333
- Last appearance: 25 March 1994; Episode 480
- Introduced by: Brian Lenanne
In-universe information
- Brothers: Samasi Palele
- Husband: Sam Aleni (1993–1994)

Talita "TP" Aleni (née Palele) was the Tongan wife of Sam Aleni (Rene Naufahu). TP originally wanted nothing to do with Sam when his brother - Nat (Joe Naufahu) fought with her brother in gang-wars. However, with the help of Jamie Forrest (Karl Urban), the two realized they had fallen in love and without their families approval, married. The two struggled with married life but stayed in love nonetheless. However TP was shocked to learn Sam had dated a drug addict. Unfortunately for the couple, TP was involved in a car accident in early 1994 and tragically died in the subsequent explosion. 20 years to the date of TP's death, Sam emotionally broke down to Ula Levi (Frankie Adams), explaining the impact TP's death had on his life and the subsequent loss of his second wife.

== Paul Churchill ==
Paul Churchill
- Shortland Street character
- Portrayed by: Simon Prast
- Duration: 1993–95
- First appearance: 5 October 1993; Episode 357
- Last appearance: 14 February 1995; Episode 697
- Introduced by: Brian Lenanne (1993); Tony Holden (1994); Gavin Strawhan (1995)
In-universe information
- Wife: Hazel Churchill

Paul Churchill was the villainous director of nursing who covered for Carrie Burton (Lisa Crittenden) whilst she was on leave. Whilst on paper he was a successful nurse with a happy marriage, he hid a nasty past. Paul established his divide and conquer management style by firing Steve (Andrew Binns). Paul quickly showed an interest in Jo (Greer Robson) that turned into sexual harassment and escalated to assaulting her in the supply closet. Recognising Jo was in trouble, both Carmen (Theresa Healey) and Jaki (Nancy Brunning) try to intervene individually only to be end up being blackmailed. Paul recognised Carmen as a prostitute from a massage parlour he used to frequent and Paul knew of an affair Jaki had with a dying patient’s partner. Jaki reported Paul to Dr McKenna on behalf of Jo, resulting him in being fired.

Nonetheless Paul returned the following February and tried to manipulate Jo into dropping her complaint, claiming that he had changed due to counselling and his wife’s pregnancy. Jo soon saw through the lies and met with the mediator. Based on the strength of Jo and Carmen’s testimony, the mediator ruled in Jo’s favour resulting in Paul losing his employment at the polytechnic. By May the clinic was under new management and Paul was brought in as a Nursing Consultant to act as an interface between the nursing staff and the Ideal Health management team. Whilst Jo and Carmen were hoping their new boss Ellen Crozier (Robyn Malcolm) would refuse to work with him, it turned out that Ellen and Paul were old colleagues. Carmen soon discovered that Paul was behind an escalating series of attacks on sex workers and had him arrested.

Paul is brought into the clinic in January 1995 following a riot at the prison where he was being held on remand. He displayed increasingly worse neurological symptoms, however he was faking his condition. Whilst prison staff were distracted, he drugged nurse Otis Jackson (Shane Bartle), stole his uniform, and attempted to kidnap Carmen. After laying low for a few days Paul kidnapped Carmen and Guy (Craig Parker) and tried to kill them by drugging Guy and abandoning them on a yacht out on the sea. Paul was believed to have fled the country using Guy’s passport.

== Frank Connelly ==
Frank Warner (previously Burton and Connelly) was one of Carrie Burton's triplets born during Meredith's leaving party on the 11 October 1993. He moved alongside Carrie, and his siblings Finbar and Sarah to Australia when he was a few months old. His father Chris Warner visited him in November 1995. He returned to the show in December 2016. Frank would depart in 2018, but return at the end of 2019.

== Finn Connelly ==
Finn Warner (previously Burton and Connelly) was born on-screen alongside his triplet siblings, Frank and Sass in 1993. He returned in 2016 with Lukas Whiting in the role.

== Katherine Blake ==
Katherine Blake
- Shortland Street character
- Portrayed by: Margaret Umbers
- Duration: 1993–1994
- First appearance: 11 October 1993
- Last appearance: 28 January 1994
- Introduced by: Brian Lenanne
In-universe information
- Husband: Simon Mulligan

Dr. Katherine Blake (formerly named Wendy Mulligan) was the psychotic girlfriend of Chris Warner (Michael Galvin). She arrived as the replacement for Meredith Fleming (Stephanie Wilkin) and quickly got on Chris' good side. However, when she failed to save the life of Tom Neilson (Adrian Keeling), she made an enemy of Darryl Neilson (Mark Ferguson) and showed her true colours when she overpowered and threatened him when he dove into her private life. Katherine started to date Chris but some started to see her true self when a British patient named Nora recognized her from a news article in England and Katherine attempted to murder her whilst a young patient - Sarah-Jane (Lauren Porteous Morcom) watched. Kirsty (Angela Dotchin) began to research Katherine's past and found herself framed for theft. She eventually discovered Katherine was really named Wendy, had murdered her husband and was not really a doctor. A desperate Katherine attempted to flee the country but when confronted by Chris, attempted to murder him. Katherine was arrested and upon release from bail, announced to Chris that one day she would become a doctor before leaving.

== Jonathon McKenna ==
Dr. Jonathon Alexander McKenna was the homosexual brother of Rachel McKenna (Angela Bloomfield). The character's gay storyline broke ground with Kieren Hutchison reprising the role for numerous stints throughout the series.

== Lionel Skeggins ==
Lionel Skeggins was the eccentric friend of Leonard Dodds (Marton Csokas). He arrived in a guest role for Leonard's wedding in 1993 and returned in a regular role the following year. He stayed on the show for 5 years.

== Patrick Neilson ==
Patrick Neilson
- Shortland Street character
- Portrayed by: Uncredited Actor
- Appears on: 18 November 1993
- Introduced by: Brian Lenanne
In-universe information
- Occupation: Business Manager
- Father: Tom Neilson
- Mother: Marj Neilson
- Brothers: Darryl Neilson; Damien Neilson; Stuart Neilson
- Half-sisters: Jane Fitzgerald
- Wife: Amy Neilson

Patrick Neilson was the second eldest son of Marj Neilson (Elizabeth McRae) and Tom Neilson (Adrian Keeling). He was referenced throughout 1992 including attending a dinner at Marj and Tom's house off-screen, before making a single guest appearance, portrayed by an uncredited actor for his father's funeral in November 1993. Patrick got on well with Doctor Leonard Rossi-Dodds (Marton Csokas) at the wake, and shared insights from his career in Agriculture research specialising in bees.

== Jean-Luc Mafart ==
Jean-Luc Mafart
- Shortland Street character
- Portrayed by: Pierre Foret
- First appearance: 9 December 1993; Episode 404
- Last appearance: 27 December 1993; Episode 416
- Introduced by: Brian Lenanne
In-universe information
- Wife: Alison Raynor (1993)

Jean-Luc Mafart was the French husband of Alison Raynor (Danielle Cormack). The two married following Alison's departure from Shortland Street however it was not long before Alison had returned to Ferndale with the claim her husband was an international terrorist and was abusive. Jean-Luc himself showed up in town and was quick to suss out the locals in his search for Alison. Steve (Andrew Binns) was shocked when he discovered Jean-Luc had broken into his house and Hone (Temuera Morrison) was forced to pretend he dyed his hair black to explain Alison's hair dye that Jean-Luc discovered. Jean-Luc eventually found Alison and followed her to her parents farm. The two had a showdown on the barn roof and Jean-Luc slipped and fell to his death. Alison and Darryl (Mark Ferguson) covered up the crime before Alison fled New Zealand.

== Adam Brady ==
Adam Brady
- Shortland Street character
- Portrayed by: Jeremy Brennan
- Duration: 1993–1994
- First appearance: 21 December 1993; Episode 412
- Last appearance: 18 January 1994; Episode 432
- Introduced by: Brian Lenanne

Adam Brady was the mentally disturbed possible son of Jenny Harrison (Maggie Harper). Nick (Karl Burnett) began to get annoyed when Adam followed him home after school and Jenny eventually confronted Adam on Christmas. It soon turned out Adam believed he had been swapped with Nick when the two were newborns in hospital. Jenny started to get to know Adam, something which annoyed Nick and made him question his identity. Jenny brought Adam's concerns to his mother who revealed Adam was a sufferer of schizophrenia. Jenny attempted to cut ties with Adam to spend time with Nick and Adam failed to cope, losing his mind completely. He was institutionalized in early 1994.

== Benjamin Marshall ==
Benjamin Marshall
- Shortland Street character
- Portrayed by: Graham Puddle
- Duration: 1993–2005
- First appearance: 1993
- Last appearance: September 2005
- Introduced by: Brian Lenanne

Dr. Benjamin Marshall was a long running extra who was for several years, one of the show's longest running characters. Benjamin appeared in several notable scenes including the 1996 earthquake, Michael McKenna's (Paul Gittins) wake and Kirsty Knight's (Angela Dotchin) final scene. The character received a cult following and received lines after being requested by fans.
