= List of Shortland Street characters introduced in 2000 =

The following is a list of characters that first appeared in the New Zealand soap opera Shortland Street in 2000, by order of first appearance.

== Angela Weaver ==
Angela Weaver
- Shortland Street character
- Portrayed by: Katherine Hubbard
- Duration: 2000–01
- First appearance: 22 June 2000
- Last appearance: 22 February 2001
- Introduced by: Simon Bennett
In-universe information
- Occupation: Ambulance Driver at Shortland Street hospital.
- Sons: Lucas Harrison
- Grandmothers: Olive Weaver

Angela Zion Weaver first appeared in June 2000. She gained a job as the paramedic partner of Rangi Heremaia (Blair Strang) and made no secret of her crush on Nick Harrison (Karl Burnett). The two eventually got together and Ange fell pregnant. However she was diagnosed with cancer and refused treatment so that she could keep her baby. Nick was devastated but supported her through it and in December she gave birth to Lucas (Christopher Preece). In early 2001, Ange and Nick took advantage of an empty church to make vows to each other; Ange died just weeks later. At her wake, Ange was seen again in a video she had recorded for Lucas to watch as he grew up.

== Carol Beckham ==
Carol Beckham
- Shortland Street character
- Portrayed by: Robyn Worthington
- Duration: 2000–10
- First appearance: 14 December 2000
- Last appearance: September 2010
- Introduced by: Simon Bennett
In-universe information
- Occupation: Nurse at Shortland Street hospital (until 2010)

Carol Beckham appeared as starring extra for 10 years. She made her first appearance when she aided Angela Weaver (Katherine Hubbard) in her birth of Lucas Harrison (Christopher Preece). In 2008 Carol was given a warning after Maia Jeffries (Anna Jullienne) caught her handing out funeral pamphlets to patients, resulting in Carol accusing Maia of sexual favoritism. Carol was last seen in mid-2010.

== Lucas Harrison ==
Lucas Harrison
- Shortland Street character
- Portrayed by: Christopher Preece (2000); Joshua Adams (2000–01); Regan McKiernan (2000-01); Caleb Boyd (2001); William Tregidga (2002–05); Loki Smythe (2022)
- Duration: 2000–05, 2022
- First appearance: 14 December 2000
- Last appearance: 14 December 2022
- Introduced by: Simon Bennett (2000); Oliver Driver (2022)
In-universe information
- Father: Nick Harrison
- Mother: Angela Weaver
- Stepmother: Waverley Harrison
- Half-brothers: Ranger Harrison
- Half-sisters: Tina-Anne Harrison; Celica Harrison; Camry Harrison; Silvia Harrison
- Grandfathers: Barry Harrison
- Grandmothers: Jenny Harrison

Lucas Harrison made his first appearance on the show on 14 December 2000, when he was born onscreen. His mother Angela Weaver (Katherine Hubbard) had cancer but was already pregnant following her diagnosis. To keep her child, she refused treatment, much to the shock of her partner Nick Harrison (Karl Burnett). Angela loved her son dearly but died several months after his birth. A lot of his early upbringing was done by Rachel McKenna (Angela Bloomfield), Rangi Heremaia (Blair Strang) and Donna Heka (Stephanie Tauevihi) due to Nick's struggle to accept his son after Ange's death. Nick soon came to love his son and proved to be a great father. The following year, Lucas and Nick departed to London for several months. In 2004 Lucas welcomed his half sister, Tina-Anne Harrison (Libby Reber) and later luckily survived a devastating fire at his home. The next year the Harrison house was burgled and Nick decided to move the family to Taranaki; they departed in March.

Lucas would reappear with Waverley, Tina-Anne and their two younger siblings, Ranger and Celica in 2022. Livestreaming during a camping trip, the Harrisons would accidentally trigger a massive bushfire, causing a huge emergency in Ferndale.
