= Rangi Heremaia =

- Shortland Street character
- Portrayed by: Blair Strang
- Duration: 1995–2001
- First appearance: 21 March 1995
- Last appearance: 9 April 2001
- Introduced by: Gavin Strawhan
In-universe information
- Other names: Rangi Walters
- Occupation: Paramedic
- Father: Joe Bennett
- Mother: Hana Heremaia
- Half-brothers: Matt Bennett; Joshua Bennett
- Wife: Donna Heka (2000–2001)
- Sons: Toka Heremaia
- Daughters: Natasha Heremaia
- Uncles: Tamahae Broughton
- Aunts: Tui Heremaia; Kiri Broughton
- First cousins: Awhina Broughton

Te Rangitahi "Rangi" Heremaia is a fictional character on the New Zealand soap opera Shortland Street who was portrayed by Blair Strang from 1995 to 2001 and again in a cameo in 2022.

The character was renowned and iconic for his unusual and unrealistic storylines; One of which being a long running incest storyline with Donna Heka (Stephanie Tauevihi), creating a "will-they/won't-they" dynamic that lasted many years. The two eventually discovered they were in no way related and married in an iconic wedding that aired on the show's 2000th episode. Other memorable storylines for the character include his romance with Rachel McKenna (Angela Bloomfield), two car accidents (one of which left him paralyzed), getting stabbed twice, recovering from paraplegia and his girlfriend dying as he was about to propose. The character survived the 2001 cast overhaul only for Strang to quit the show due to a "stress related illness". The character was written off in a whodunit storyline that saw his body discovered after being missing for weeks. It was eventually revealed he was murdered by his mistress' husband.

The character and his romance with Donna proved highly favourable for fans, with his absurd storylines also being remembered as iconic. Rangi's death remains known as one of the most memorable deaths on the show.

== Creation and casting ==
Whilst studying law, Blair Strang won the role of Rangi, who was to be a stereotypical northerner and a four-month recurring character. Strang had previously auditioned unsuccessfully for 4 or 5 other roles. Upon the soap's infamous revamp in 2000 that saw 14 characters written off, producers ensured fan favourite Rangi would stay. However Strang's girlfriend - Katrina Devine who portrayed Minnie Crozier was deeply upset as her character had been part of the axing. Strang started to clash with what he saw as poor management and decided to quit the soap shortly after the revamp. His departure was blamed on a "stress related illness" by producers.

== Storylines ==
Rangi arrived to the clinic and won the job of a paramedic alongside Sam Aleni (Rene Naufahu). He started to date Rachel McKenna (Angela Bloomfield) but was traumatized by killing a man in a car crash. The arrival of his son Toka (Redmond McCarthy) and ex-girlfriend proved poor for his relationship with Rachel but the two stayed together even when Rangi had an affair with Rebecca Frost (Luisa Burgess). However, when Rangi became paralysed after a motorbike incident, the two finally split but Rachel ended up passing out drunk in her car and nearly killing the wheelchair-using Rangi. Rangi survived and resumed his romance with Rebecca after he miraculously regained his ability to walk. However, as Rangi prepared to propose, Rebecca suddenly died from a faulty heart valve. Rangi started to date fellow paramedic Donna Heka (Stephanie Tauevihi) but the romance was cut short following the revelation they were in fact siblings.

Rangi had a brief affair with Ellen Crozier (Robyn Malcolm) and was briefly accused of abusing elderly women. Rangi went into hiding and Donna helped him through the ordeal shortly before fellow paramedic Mark Shawn (Tony MacIver) was revealed as the true culprit. Rangi and Donna slept together however the two acknowledged the romance was wrong and Rangi had a brief fling with Caroline Buxton (Tandi Wright). In 1999 Rangi dated both Shivani Naran (Madeleine Sami) and Janet Maxwell (Katrina Hobbs) but as the year ended, Rangi was delighted to discover Donna was in fact a result of an affair and in no way related to him. Rangi helped clear Donna of murder. He broke up with Janet and he finally married Donna. The two decided to have children but Donna proved infertile and Rangi had to take out a loan to fund IVF. However, Rangi went missing and it was only a few days later that Rangi's body was found, he had been drowned. The police suspected suicide but Donna investigated and soon discovered Rangi had a secret double life with a woman named Adrianna (Emily Mowbray) and her husband Kim Tairoa (Patrick Kake) had murdered him when he decided to stay with Donna.

== Character development ==
=== Relationship with Donna ===
Stephanie Tauevihi was cast as Donna Heka, a love interest for Rangi and debuted in 1997. Initially the romance was meant to be straightforward but when an incestuous storyline was suggested, producers realized how much material they would have to work with and a storyline where the happy couple would realize they are half siblings was conducted. The revelation caused Rangi to begin drinking and Donna to flee town. However the audience related well to the couple and when producers decided to make the two sleep again, there were no complaints from fans as were expected. Due to such high audience reaction, the paternity was unraveled in 1999, setting off a cliffhanger that saw the two possibly reconcile in the new millennium. When Donna was accused of murder, Rangi helped her through it and the two reconciled and married on the show's 2000th episode. Tauevihi enjoyed the couples marital bliss stating; "I had a huge storyline ... so it's nice to give that a bit of a flick, sit back and settle into post-marital domestic bliss. There are lots of soft, gentle moments between [Donna and Rangi] which is really nice to play out when you've been doing the angst-ridden, angry, pent-up, can't talk about it stuff." However the happiness didn't last for the couple, and Rangi went missing only to be discovered dead. Donna discovered Rangi was cheating on her but had decided to stay with her only to be murdered by his mistress and her husband.

== Reception ==
Strang was nominated for the "Best Supporting Actor" award in the 2000 TV Guide Television Awards. The character of Rangi was famous for the risky and abstract storylines he went through. Two notable storylines included the character recovering from paraplegia and dating his suspected sister. One particular storyline for the character was cut completely in that it was seen far too controversial. The storyline was to see offscreen lovers - Strang and Katrina Devine's characters - Rangi and Minnie participate in an affair whilst Rangi was dating Minnie's mother - Ellen. The incestuous relationship between Rangi and Donna proved to be one of the soap's most iconic storylines, with the wedding episode being singled out as one of Shortland Street's best bits. Years later, storyliner Victor Rodger reflected on the incest plot critically, citing its use of an "unfortunate stereotype": "There were storylines that I struggled with as a Samoan. But, how I used to look at it is that it's largely a palagi show that happens to have diverse actors in it, largely ... I'm sure that culture has changed to a degree, but once you recognize that, you go, ‘OK, this would never happen in real life, but this is a soap opera." Rangi's death proved memorable with fans hoping the character was "doing a Tom Neilson" and would return. The death remained the last death of a core cast member for 3 years. The storyline that saw Rangi nearly die at the hands of a drunk Rachel, was voted by fans as one of the shows most iconic moments.
