= Waverley Harrison =

- Shortland Street character
- Portrayed by: Claire Chitham
- Duration: 1994–1995, 1998–2005, 2017, 2022
- First appearance: 4 October 1994; Episode 617
- Last appearance: 14 December 2022
- Introduced by: Tony Holden (1994); Simon Bennett (1998); Maxine Fleming (2017); Oliver Driver (2022)
- Book appearances: Nick's Story - Shortland Street Books (1996)
In-universe information
- Occupation: Receptionist
- Father: John Wilson
- Mother: Trish Wilson
- Brothers: Stratford Wilson
- Sisters: Amberley Wilson
- Husband: Nick Harrison (2002–)
- Sons: Camry Harrison
- Daughters: Tina-Anne Harrison; Ranger Harrison; Celica Harrison; Silvia Harrison
- Stepsons: Lucas Harrison
- Grandfathers: Albert King
- Uncles: Michael McKenna
- Aunts: Alex McKenna; Sharon Wilson
- First cousins: Jonathan McKenna; Rachel McKenna; Eltham Wilson

Waverley "Wave" Harrison (also Wilson, previously Wallasee) is a fictional character on the New Zealand soap opera Shortland Street. She was portrayed by Claire Chitham and was introduced as a love interest for Nick Harrison who she eventually married eight years after her arrival to the show. The character returned along with husband Nick for the show's 25th anniversary episode that aired on 25 May 2017. Waverley also returned with Lucas and three of her and Nick's children for the 2022 finale.

== Creation and casting ==
Waverley arrived as a love interest for Nick Harrison (Karl Burnett) and as part of the McKenna family unit. Sixteen-year-old Claire Chitham auditioned for the role and ended up winning it. After several months on the show, producers decided the character of Waverley had run her desired course and she was written off. Chitham believed her time on the soap was over and finished school, started a degree and began acting in other jobs. However, in 1998 Chitham was contacted by the show with a pitch that would see Waverley return in a 3-month stint. Chitham was hugely surprised as nothing of that calibre had happened before in the show and she happily accepted. She stated, "It’s good to be back. When you know how the system of this place operates it’s very easy to slip back in, so it feels like I never was away."

In 2004 the character of Waverley was axed from the show, alongside husband, Nick. The Harrison family made their last appearance on 17 March 2005. Chitham found it unusual leaving the soap having worked on it for 8 years, "I understood at that point I was living in a very extreme world. After eight years in the job I was earning great money, with good opportunities and time to spare. Yet I knew I was perfectly capable of coping with reality, and having been there since I was 18, I didn’t know what my reality was." Following her exit, Chitham was asked to reprise her role but at the time believed she was, "on my way to other things". For the soap's 25th anniversary, Chitham and Burnett were asked to reprise their roles for a feature-length episode. Chitham described returning as, "weird" and compared it to being asked, "to have sex with an ex". Chitham made her reappearance on 25 May 2017.

== Storylines ==
Waverley arrived to stay with her aunt Alex McKenna (Liddy Holloway) and quickly landed a job at the reception of the clinic. She developed a crush on Stuart Neilson (Martin Henderson) but realised she was too inexperienced sexually and so lost her virginity to Nick (Karl Burnett). But it was not long before Waverley fell for Nick and they became a steady couple. Waverley discovered that Nick had married her cousin Rachel (Angela Bloomfield) in a student protest and fled the country in tears. Waverely returned more than two years later and asked Nick to return to her. However, by the time Nick realised Waverley was the girl for him, her husband Roger (Brett Coutts) arrived and a frustrated Waverley fled town again. She returned several months later and reconciled with Nick and the two got engaged. Waverley discovered that her marriage to Roger was invalid as it was bigamous, but nonetheless, slept with him when he returned. Nick forgave her but when she cut his hair off in his sleep, the relationship ended. Waverley rebounded with his professional rival, Josh Sinclair (Philip Patston) but the relationship was short lived, Waverley dumping Josh after Nick discovered Josh was a part-owner of Waverley's competition, Coffeeteria and that Josh was trying to stoop to dishonest measures to take Waverley over.

Waverley began to date Fergus (Paul Ellis), but the two broke up and she briefly dated Jed Ferris (Johnny Barker) before she reunited with Fergus. The two prepared to marry, but on the wedding day police arrived to arrest Fergus for his part in an illegal immigration and he fled. Waverley moved on to Adam Heywood (Leighton Cardno) but realised she still loved Nick. The two finally reconciled and married. However the happiness was brief when Waverley discovered she had breast cancer. Nick supported her through the ordeal and she fell pregnant, only to suffer a miscarriage. Waverley eventually fell pregnant again and gave birth to a daughter named Tina-Anne (Libby Reber). When Waverley and Nick's house was broken into, the family decided to leave Ferndale for Taranaki. Waverley discovered Nick had misplaced the marriage certificate on their wedding day and their marriage could be invalid as Nick made a copy but subsequently Nick organised a vowel renewal shortly before the Harrison's left Ferndale.

Nick and Waverley returned for Chris' 50th birthday and revealed that they had since had 3 more children since Tina-Anne. Arguing over Waverley's wish for Nick to undergo a vasectomy, the couple helped out as Ferndale was hit with a volcanic eruption. The two were shocked to discover that Waverley was again pregnant but came to be happy following wisdom from Marj (Elizabeth McRae) before she died moments later.

== Character development ==
=== Relationship with Nick Harrison ===
Waverley was introduced to the show as a love interest for established character, Nick Harrison (Karl Burnett). Waverley at first used Nick to get to Stuart Neilson (Martin Henderson), but it was not long before something more serious developed. In 1995 the couple had a pregnancy scare and Nick nervously proposed to Waverley before they found out it was a mistake and he retracted his action. Waverley was devastated to learn Nick had married her cousin Rachel (Angela Bloomfield) during a protest on student allowance and she fled the country. Chitham and Burnett got on well, something which benefitted the couples onscreen relationship, Chitham stated, "Karl’s lovely. He’s very good to work with... I think we’ve got a really good rapport going – you have to if you’re playing a couple on screen." Upon returning after 3 years in 1998, Waverley hoped that Nick had made a substantial change, Chitham stated, "Waverley wants him to have grown up and sorted himself out, have a respectable job and be a man – a suitable man to be her partner and she won’t settle for anything less. She sticks to her morals really strongly and that is one of the aspects in which I think she’s grown up a lot." Speaking of Nick's attempts to meet Waverleys demands, Chitham said, "He makes an effort to meet her requirements. We get there in the end." The two became engaged but Nick was devastated when Waverley cut his trademark hair whilst they slept and they broke up.

Just over a year later, Nick's partner Angela Weaver (Katherine Hubbard) died, leaving him with the care of their son, Lucas (Joshua Adams). Waverley looked after the baby alongside Rachel. As 2001 came to an end, Nick announced his love to Waverley. Waverley turned him down and Nick left Ferndale for England so that Burnett could take a sabbatical. When he returned, Nick and Waverley finally reconciled and got engaged. The wedding was cancelled however when Waverley's ex fiancé, Fergus Kearney (Paul Ellis) kidnapped her on the day of the ceremony. She was rescued however and the two finally married in an episode marked by the return of original characters, Jenny Harrison (Maggie Harper) and Marj Brasch (Elizabeth McRae). The following year Waverley was diagnosed with breast cancer and did not tell Nick. Waverley recovered and soon fell pregnant, giving birth to a daughter, Tina-Anne Harrison (Damikah Chancher) on the shows 3000th episode. A fire at Nick and Wave's bar, 'The Dog's Day Inn', nearly saw an end to Lucas and Tina-Anne, but both were rescued by Wave's cousin Eltham Wilson (Kip Chapman). In 2005, the couple's home was struck by a home invader and an increasingly paranoid Nick mistook Wave for a burglar and shook a gun at her. As a result of their insecurities, the Harrison's left Ferndale for Taranaki.

== Reception ==
Waverely received a hugely positive reception, being labelled one of the shows most; "enduringly popular characters". She has been named as one of the show's most successful comedic characters. The declaration of love made by Adam Heywood (Leighton Cardno) towards Waverley in 2002 was praised by audiences due to its unpredictability, producer Harriet Crampton commented, "People love those sorts of unexpected moments that come out of nowhere." In 2004 a reviewer compared Waverley and Nick's relationship to that of the iconic Coronation Street couple, Ken and Deirdre Barlow. Waverley's run of storylines have been described as "spectacular". Following her axing, Chitham expressed her joy of playing Waverley, "I loved playing Waverley. She was easy to fall in love with, and to play. She had a heart of gold and was harmless. And the best thing was she was this really great comic character. I was grateful that Waverley was a Character with a capital C, and I would love to have a career filled with characters like that." In 2017 Ricardo Simich expressed his desire for Waverley to return for the soap opera's 25th anniversary saying it was a "must" she be reunited with Marj Brasch.
