= Tom Neilson =

- Shortland Street character
- Portrayed by: Adrian Keeling
- Duration: 1992–93
- First appearance: 25 May 1992
- Last appearance: 11 November 1993
- Introduced by: Caterina De Nave (1992); Brian Lennane (1993)
In-universe information
- Occupation: Paramedic
- Wife: Marj Neilson (1958–93)
- Sons: Patrick Neilson; Darryl Neilson; Damien Neilson; Stuart Neilson
- Stepdaughters: Jane Fitzgerald
- Grandsons: Robert Neilson
- Granddaughters: Melissa Neilson; Rebecca Stanton

Tom Leslie Neilson is a fictional character on the New Zealand soap opera Shortland Street. Part of the original cast, Tom was portrayed by Adrian Keeling from the show's first episode until February the following year when the character starred in a high profile storyline where Tom went missing. He returned later in the year to finish the storyline.

The character debuted as the patriarch of the original family unit on the show, the Neilsons. He was a paramedic alongside Sam Aleni (Rene Naufahu) and worked at Shortland Street clinic, where his wife Marj (Elizabeth McRae) fronted reception. Tom had four sons, Patrick, villainous Darryl (Mark Ferguson), Damien (Mark Ferguson) and original teenage heart throb Stuart (Martin Henderson). The character's yearlong run saw the character participate in numerous storylines, including teenage pregnancy, rape, drug abuse, illness and a storyline that saw Tom become a missing person.

The storyline that saw Tom go missing became hugely popular, so much so that Tom was eventually brought back to finish off the storyline. It is now remembered as one of the most iconic storylines in the early days of the soap opera.

== Creation and casting ==
Adrian Keeling was cast as Tom, the patriarch of the Neilson family unit. Keeling resigned from the role after his initial 1-year contract expired and the character was written off as running away from his family. This was the writers original pitch to get rid of the character, but public interest was so high, the character returned in November only to be killed off once and for all.

== Storylines ==
Tom was shocked in May 1992 when teenage son Stuart Neilson (Martin Henderson) claimed to be the father of a new born baby. However Tom soon learnt this was not the case and the true father was Tom and Marj's (Elizabeth McRae) manipulative other son, Darryl (Mark Ferguson). Tom started to suffer from narcolepsy and was almost burnt the Neilson family home down when he fell asleep and knocked a blanket over a heater. Tom would strike up a friendship with Alison Raynor (Danielle Cormack)'s mother Irene which caused jealousy on Marj's part, but Tom assured Marj nothing was happening. Disaster struck later on when Tom was crushed in a building collapse. An ill Tom eventually recovered but he soon learnt Darryl had attempted to rape Kirsty (Angela Dotchin) and kicked his son out of the house. Tom was distraught when Marj revealed she was allowing her secret daughter she adopted out at birth, Jane (Katherine McRae), to enter their lives. Tom could not cope with Marj's lies and the marriage deteriorated to a point in early 1993, when Tom told Marj he was going to the dairy to get some cream and did not return.

Marj was devastated, expecting the worst, but she soon realized their savings had been cleared, meaning Tom was likely alive. In September 1993 Marj was contacted by a woman who claimed to be in a cult with Tom and who asked Marj for money. Marj refused to pay the mystery women and Tom surprisingly returned to her life in October 1993 when he revealed he needed time off and had been living in a cult. Tom also revealed he needed a kidney transplant and an upset Darryl volunteered his. Shortly after the surgery, Tom had a heart attack and died, with Darryl by his side. His funeral was held a few days later with his friends and colleagues attending.

The storyline was so high profile, even well known broadcaster Paul Holmes appeared on the soap opera, fictionally covering Tom's disappearance.

== Character development ==
=== Missing-person storyline ===
When Keeling opted to leave the role, producers decided to make the character go through a missing-person storyline, where he ditched his wife and children after the marriage dissolved as a result of Marj's illegitimate daughter. The storyline seemed an "economical" write out, and helped develop the character of Marj who at that point was coming across as two-dimensional. It featured Tom going to the dairy and not returning, with Marj later discovering he had emptied the savings. Broadcaster Paul Holmes made a guest appearance on the show, featuring Tom's disappearance on his talk show. The storyline became hugely popular, with Keeling getting constantly hassled on the street by fans. Keeling's co star, Michael Galvin who portrayed Dr. Chris Warner enjoyed the storyline and liked how they left it mysteriously open. Fans continued to ask what happened to Tom which annoyed Keeling, resulting in him begging to be written back into the soap. Producers also decided it was best the audience got closure and so Tom was written back into the soap, with the explanation he had been living in a cult but returned needing a kidney transplant. The character stayed on the show for several weeks in a guest role before being killed off, suffering a heart attack while recovering from surgery. Galvin disapproved of Tom being written back in, describing it as a "cop out".

== Reception ==
The storyline that saw Tom go missing is still hailed as one of the most iconic storylines ever featured in the soap opera and the write out featuring Tom going to get cream and never returning, later became a codename when writers wrote off characters, with writers being quoted as saying; "Sorry, you're going to buy the cream, mate."
