= Theresa Healey =

New Zealand actress (born 1964)

- Born: Theresa Marie Healey; January 25, 1964 (age 62); New Zealand
- Occupation: Actor

Theresa Healey (born 25 January 1964) is a New Zealand actress, known mostly for her role as nurse Carmen Roberts in the New Zealand soap opera Shortland Street.

== Early life ==
Theresa was born on 25 January 1964 and is of Irish Catholic descent. As a child, Healey went to a mixture of schools, state and Catholic, including Sacred Heart College in Hamilton. She has three siblings: Susan, Mark and Anthony. She graduated from Toi Whakaari: New Zealand Drama School in 1985 with a Diploma in Acting, and afterwards moved back to Auckland.

== Career ==
Healey has been a guest on the New Zealand version the television series of Dancing With The Stars and starred as Alison Smart in the New Zealand comedy/drama television series Go Girls. She has also had regular recurring roles on the New Zealand television series Mercy Peak and the television series Xena: Warrior Princess.

== Personal life ==
As of 2009, Healey was still married to film producer Steven O'Meagher; the couple have two boys together, older son Zachary and Xavier, and were living in central Auckland. By 2017, the pair had divorced.

== Filmography ==
=== Film ===
Year	Title	Role	Notes
1989	Kitchen Sink	Woman	Short film
1994	The Last Tattoo	Cora Bell	
1994	Bread & Roses	Peggy	
1998	Angel Wings	Bernadette	Short film
2000	Savage Honeymoon	Jenny Webb	
2000	Jubilee	Pauline Williams	
2003	Sylvia	3rd woman at Hughes lecture	

=== Television ===
Year	Title	Role	Notes
1993-1995, 2020-2021, 2024	Shortland Street	Carmen Roberts; Rosalyn Mullens	Main role Guest
1997	2 People	Co-Host	TV series
1999	Jaffa's Big Picture Show		TV series
2000	Xena: Warrior Princess	Celesta	"Looking Death in the Eye"
2002	Murder in Greenwich	Hildy Southerlyn	TV film
2003	Lucy	Madelyn Pugh	TV film
2003	Mercy Peak	Jill	"Great Escape", "Do It for Love", "Rules of the Game"
2009-2012	Go Girls	Alison Smart	Recurring role
2013	The Blue Rose	Helen Irwin	Recurring role
2013	Harry	Dr. Alex Boucher	Recurring role
2013-2014	Agent Anna	Sandi Wright	Main role
2014	Coverband	Dee	"Noise Control"
2016	Filthy Rich	Vivian Hunt Truebridge	13 episodes
2016	The Brokenwood Mysteries	Janelle Peacocke	"Over Her Dead Body"
