= Chic Littlewood =

New Zealand television entertainer and actor

Cecil "Chic" Littlewood (17 November 1930 – 11 January 2015) was a New Zealand television entertainer and actor.

== Biography ==
Born on 17 November 1930 in southeast London, England, Littlewood originally worked as a baker. He had a gift for mimicry, but his shyness meant he did not use it for entertainment purposes for several years, until he started appearing in—and winning—talent shows. He was offered an audition by the BBC in 1964, but had already accepted assisted passage to New Zealand.

Littlewood arrived in Auckland in 1964 with wife and two sons, working initially as a baker, but also hoping to continue in show business. He appeared on NZBC talent show Have A Shot and through this gained several other television parts. In 1967, Littlewood got a guest spot on the Kevan Moore-produced show The Late Show, which was well enough received that he became a regular on the show's following season.

In 1975 Littlewood was approached by Moore to put together an after-school programme for the newly launched South Pacific Television (SPTV). Littlewood created a new show, Now C Here, which morphed into Chicaboom and then Chic Chat, a regular daily afternoon children's show, in which Littlewood used his mimicry skills to create an ensemble of characters. The show moved to TV One after the amalgamation of TVNZ and South Pacific Television in 1980, where it ran twice-weekly until 1983. Littlewood won the Feltex Award as New Zealand Entertainer of the Year in 1977, and he received the 1979 Benny Award from the Variety Artists Club of New Zealand.

Littlewood dabbled in serious acting with a 1975 role in SPTV's series The Immigrants, and following the end of Chic Chat this side of his career increased. In the early 1990s he appeared in a television commercial promoting New Zealand butter, using his skills of mimicry as numerous well-known celebrities. He appeared as a regular on Shortland Street in the role of Laurie Brasch from 1993 to 1996, and had occasional roles in such series as Mercy Peak. In 2007 he played Isaac Bulosan in the horror film 30 Days of Night, and had a small role as a security guard in Peter Jackson's remake of King Kong.

Littlewood died in Auckland on 11 January 2015 after a long illness, aged 84.

== Filmography ==
Year	Title	Role	Notes
1988	Just Me and Mario	Bill	
1993	White Fang	Dog's owner	TV series
2001	No One Can Hear You	Doc Everet	
2005	King Kong	Old Security Guard	
2007	30 Days of Night	Isaac Bulosan	(final film role)
