= Katrina Devine =

New Zealand actress (born 1980)

- Born: 21 April 1980 (age 46); Northern Ireland
- Occupation: Television actress
- Years active: 1994–2010
- Spouse: Blair Strang (m. 2001, divorced)

Katrina Devine (born 21 April 1980) is an Irish-born New Zealand actress.

== Biography ==
Devine migrated to New Zealand with her family when she was six years old and competed in Irish dance during her teens.

In 1994, she earned a role on Shortland Street, which she appeared in for eight years playing receptionist Minnie Crozier. In 1998, she won the best supporting actress award at the New Zealand Television Awards for her work on the show.

In 2001, Devine married former Shortland Street co-star Blair Strang; the couple later divorced.

In 2003, Devine played the villainous Marah on Power Rangers Ninja Storm, and later returned to play the recurring role of Cassidy on Power Rangers Dino Thunder in 2004.

She has sung in several musical productions and was an editor of the New Zealand teen magazine Creme.

== Filmography ==
Film and television
Year	Title	Role	Notes
1994–2001	Shortland Street	Minnie Crozier	Regular role
2001	Xena: Warrior Princess	Nicha	Episode: "Last of the Centaurs"
2002	Atomic Twister	Gloria	TV film
2002	Street Legal	Maureen	Episodes: "The Good Son", "Sea of Troubles"
2003	Power Rangers Ninja Storm	Marah	Regular role
2004	Power Rangers Dino Thunder	Cassidy Cornell	Regular role
2004	Power Rangers Dino Thunder	Marah	"Thunder Storm" Pt. 1 and 2 (PRDT/PRNS crossover)
2004	Not Only But Always	TV Showbiz Reporter	TV film
2006	The Gift	Susie	Written and directed by Ryan Furlong (short)
2006	Snake Road	Girlfriend	TV short
2007	Left for Dead	Lori	
2010	The Man Who Loved Flowers	Young Woman	Short
