= Claire Chitham =

New Zealand television actress

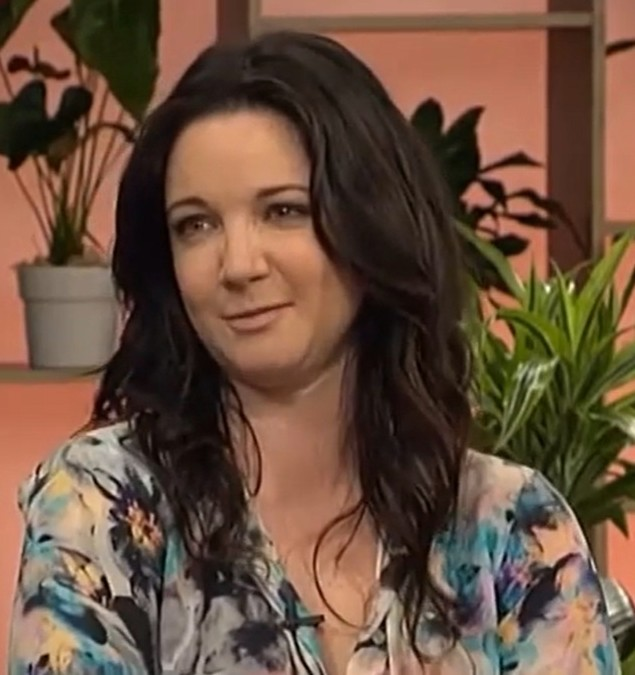
- Chitham in 2017
- Born: Claire Margaret Chitham; 12 July 1978 (age 48); Auckland, New Zealand
- Occupation: Actress
- Years active: 1990-present
- Spouse: Mikey 'Havoc' Roberts (divorced)

Claire Chitham (born 12 July 1978, in Auckland) is a New Zealand television actress. Claire rose to fame as Waverley Harrison (née Wilson) in the New Zealand TV show Shortland Street, from 1994 to 1995 and 1997 to 2005 and Aurora Bay in Outrageous Fortune from 2006 to 2007.

== Career ==
Her first television role was a guest appearance in The New Adventures of Black Beauty (1990). A recurring guest role in Shortland Street followed, which went on to become core cast, with Chitham starring in the show for seven years as Waverley Wilson (later Harrison).

Chitham next appeared as Aurora Bay, in the second and third seasons of Outrageous Fortune, New Zealand's highest rating drama. Aurora was the longtime love interest of Van West (Antony Starr). Her character died after being hit by a bus while trying to hide her ex-boyfriend Tyson's (Ben Barrington) stash of drugs.

On 22 August 2007, she began appearing as Chantelle Rebecchi in the Australian soap opera Neighbours.

In 2008 Chitham appeared in Episode 1 of the Australian television series Canal Road. Her character, Kristen, plays the wife of core cast member Det Snr Const Ray Driscoll (played by Grant Bowler, who also played Wolf, her father in-law-to-be in Outrageous Fortune).

In 2009 Chitham guest starred in the TV series Legend of the Seeker in the episode 'Mirror' (season 1, episode 18). She also featured in Muller Yoghurt advertisements screened in New Zealand and the UK and guest starred as herself in the New Zealand comedy series The Jaquie Brown Diaries.

Claire appeared as Angela Phillips in Australian feature film The Cup in 2011. Based on the true story of the 2002 Melbourne Cup race, The Cup was directed by Simon Wincer and starring Brendan Gleeson.

Having studied in New York and Los Angeles, Chitham has also appeared in a number of stage productions, including Rabbit, by Nina Raine; The Real Thing, by Tom Stoppard; and The Only Child, by Simon Stone.

== Filmography ==
=== Television ===
Year	Title	Role	Notes
1990	The New Adventures of Black Beauty	Isambard	unknown episodes
1992	The Ray Bradbury Theater	Rosalyn Auffmann	"The Happiness Machine" (S06E02)
1994–95	Shortland Street	Waverley Wilson	unknown episodes
1995	Riding High	Hannah	unknown episodes
1998–2005, 2017, 2022	Shortland Street	Waverley Wilson/Harrison	Main role
2005	Interrogation	Girl in Woods	unknown episodes
2006–07	Outrageous Fortune	Aurora Bay	Series regular, 17 episodes
2007	Neighbours	Chantelle Rebecchi	3 episodes
2008	Canal Road	Kristen Flowers	unknown episodes
2009	Legend of the Seeker	Bianca	"Mirror" (S01E18)
2017–18	Power Rangers Ninja Steel	Mrs. Finch	8 episodes
2019	Fresh Eggs	Penny	Main role
2020	Mean Mums	Jane	Episode: Season 2, Episode 5
2021	The Brokenwood Mysteries	Sophie Grainger	Episode: "Something Nasty in the Market"

=== Film ===
Year	Title	Role	Notes
2011	The Cup	Angela Phillips	Drama
2019	Falling Inn Love	Shelley	

== Personal life ==
In early 2006, Chitham married New Zealand musician, TV personality and radio DJ Mikey 'Havoc' Roberts. It was reported in early 2009 that they had separated. They are now divorced. Chitham remained in their West Auckland marital home following the split.
