= Elizabeth McRae =

New Zealand actress (born 1936)

Elizabeth McRae ONZM
- Born: Elizabeth Helen Kersley; 1 August 1936 (age 90); Wellington, New Zealand
- Education: Victoria University College
- Occupation: Actor
- Years active: 1955–present
- Known for: Shortland Street
- Height: 1.64 m (5 ft 5 in)

Elizabeth Helen McRae ONZM (née Kersley; born 1 August 1936) is a New Zealand actress, best known for her portrayal of Marjorie Brasch (née Neilson) in the television soap opera Shortland Street, and, in the last decade, as Jean Marlowe, in the internationally distributed TV series The Brokenwood Mysteries.

== Biography ==
Born in Wellington in 1936, McRae was educated at Wellington Girls' College from 1950 to 1954 and was head prefect in her final year. She graduated from Victoria University College with a Bachelor of Arts degree in 1958 and married architect Don McRae in Wellington the following year. The couple's children include actress, scriptwriter and director Katherine McRae.

Her first theatrical role was in Nola Millar's 1955 production of Richard II at Wellington's Unity Theatre, which also featured Tim Eliott in his acting debut.

McRae made her television debut on the NZBC in the children's mini-series The Games Affair in 1974, and went on to appear in many other New Zealand television programmes including Mortimer's Patch, Mercy Peak, Terry and the Gunrunners, and Go Girls. However, it is for her recurring role as receptionist-turned-MP Marjorie Brasch on the long-running New Zealand television soap opera Shortland Street that she is most well-known. McRae played the role from the soap's first episode in 1992, speaking the show's first line, until 1996, with further appearances in 1998, 2002, and on the 20th anniversary episode in 2012.

McRae's film acting credits include Never Say Die (1988), An Angel at My Table (1990), 30 Days of Night (2006) and, in 2010, Rest for the Wicked, in which she played the lead role of Lillian.

McRae was named best actress in a radio drama production at the 1982 Mobil New Zealand Radio Awards and was appointed an Officer of the New Zealand Order of Merit, for services to theatre, in the 2006 Queen's Birthday Honours.

== Filmography ==
=== Film ===
Year	Title	Role	Notes
1982	The Scarecrow	Mrs. Peacock	
1985	Hot Target	Mrs. Harris	
1986	Return Journey	Edith	
1987	A Death in the Family	Aunty Pam	
1988	Never Say Die	Daisy	
1997	Home Movie	Thea	
2000	Jubilee	Agnes Morrison	
2002	All About Reinalda	Marge Brasch	
2004	My Father's Shoes	Cynthia	Short
2007	30 Days of Night	Helen Munson	
2008	Journey to Ihipa	Gladys Matenga	Short
2011	Rest for the Wicked	Lilliam	
2011	Check Out	Enid Cartwright	Short

=== Television ===
Year	Title	Role	Notes
1981	Mortimer's Patch	Mrs. Higgins	Episode: "Fighting Johnny Fuller"
1982	One of those Blighters	Lydia Kingsbeer	TV film
1984	Iris (aka Out of Time)	Augusta Wilkinson	TV film
1985	The Adventures of Terry Teo	Mr. Camper	Episode: "Terry and the Gunrunners: Part 2"
1985	Hanlon	Mrs. Hornby	Episode: "In Defence of Minnie Dean"
1987	Steel Riders	Ms. Blake	Episode: "Hacking"
1989	Hot Shotz	Billie Travis	Episode 2
1990	Shark in the Park	May	Episode: "The First Cut is the Deepest"
1992–1996, 1998, 2002, 2012, 2017	Shortland Street	Marjorie Brasch	Regular role
2002	Mercy Peak	Mitzy Geers	Episode: "Fear and Loathing"
2006	Power Rangers Mystic Force	White Tribunal (voice)	Episodes: "Dark Wish: Parts 2 & 3"
2007	The Man Who Lost His Head	Mary	TV film
2009	Go Girls	Mavis Boyle	Episode: "Less Than Zero"
2013	The Blue Rose	Beryl	Episode: "There Is a Light That Never Goes Out"
2014	Agent Anna	Edith	Episode: "2.6"
2015–2019, 2021	The Brokenwood Mysteries	Jean Marlowe	Recurring role (series 2–7)
