= Karl Burnett =

New Zealand actor

- Born: 27 February 1976 (age 50); New Zealand
- Occupations: Actor, director, writer, video game-maker.
- Known for: Nick Harrison in Shortland Street

Karl Burnett (born 27 February 1976) is a New Zealand actor best known for his portrayal of Nick Harrison on the long-running New Zealand soap opera, Shortland Street.

== Biography ==
Burnett was 16 years old when offered the role of Nick Harrison on Shortland Street in 1992. The then Massey High School student had little acting experience, other than high-school drama classes, though after six years of starring on Shortland Street he had a part in the 1998 film When Love Comes. He played the role of Nick Harrison from the show's second episode in 1992 until the character's departure in 2005, making Nick Harrison the original character to stay with the show the longest. Nick Harrison was originally intended as a drug-taking rebel, but after Burnett was cast, the role was developed into a more comedic and clumsy character. In 2005, after 13 years on the show, the character of Nick was axed by producers.

Later in 2005, Burnett appeared in TV3's celebrity singing competition Sing Like a Superstar. Burnett went on to work as a boom operator on Shortland Street and a freelance sound recordist.

In 2008 Burnett appeared on the weight-loss reality show Downsize Me. He initially weighed 120 kg, losing 20 kg over the course of the programme. That year he also published a comedy novella The Bible II: This Way Up – Rick the Chosen One.

In 2010 he released the independent film Captain Amazingly Incredible and the Space Vampires from the Evil Planet!!!, which he wrote, directed, and starred in. The film was self-described as "the lowest selling movie in the history of ... the [film's] distributor."

Burnett has also released several video games for mobile platforms, including Get Gravel!, Codestorm, Project Downforce and Max Vector: Resolution. Having previously studied interactive videogame development at Media Design School in Auckland, Burnett won the 2011 Sidhe Elite scholarship award.

Burnett now works as a creative director in advertising.
