= List of original Shortland Street characters =

The following is a list of the 16 original regular characters from the long-running TVNZ soap opera Shortland Street. Envisioned by the show's creator Caterina De Nave alongside Jason Daniel and Ken Catran, amongst others, the characters were meant to demonstrate workers in a busy domestic city, working in a private medical clinic. They utilized the characters to not only portray a large range of nationalities, but also reach out to several different age and gender demographics.

== Original cast ==
The show's original cast.

Character	Actor	Duration	Character status
Michael McKenna	Paul Gittins	1992–95, 1997–99	Died of a heart attack in 1999
Chris Warner	Michael Galvin	1992-96 , 2000-	Current cast
Meredith Fleming	Stephanie Wilkin	1992–94	Alive as of 1995
Hone Ropata	Temuera Morrison	1992-95 , 2008 , 2026	Alive as of 2026
Carrie Burton	Lisa Crittenden	1992–93
Jaki Manu	Nancy Brunning	1992–94	Died offscreen in 2019
Steve Mills	Andrew Binns	1992–94	Died from car explosion in 1994
Sam Aleni	Rene Naufahu	1992–96, 2014	Alive as of 2015
Alison Raynor	Danielle Cormack	1992–93	died off screen 2010
Tom Neilson	Adrian Keeling	1992–93	Died from heart attack in 1993
Stuart Neilson	Martin Henderson	1992–95, 2017	Alive as of 2017
Marjorie Neilson	Elizabeth McRae	1992–96, 1998, 2002, 2012, 2017	died on screen 2017
Kirsty Knight	Angela Dotchin	1992–98	Alive as of 1998
Jenny Harrison	Maggie Harper	1992–98, 2002	Alive as of 2002
Nick Harrison	Karl Burnett	1992–2005, 2017	Alive as of 2022
Gina Rossi-Dodds	Josephine Davison	1992–95, 2026	Alive as of 2026

== Creation ==
As part of creating the soap that was to become Shortland Street, Caterina De Nave had numerous goals she wished to achieve. These included the development of several characters that would expand the soap's demographic and relate to viewers. After viewing Australian soaps, Neighbours and Home and Away, De Nave noticed that the casts had very little ethnic diversity and decided to include characters from several ethnicities into Shortland Street's cast to represent New Zealand's culture. This led to the development of two Māori characters and a Samoan. At the time in New Zealand, there was only one Pacific Islander working as a paramedic, and the Samoan character of Sam Aleni was placed as an experienced and hard-working ambulance worker. De Nave also noticed that the role of women in soap operas often saw them portrayed as much weaker and more vulnerable than their male equivalents and decided to write several female characters as strong and powerful matriarchs.

Producers incorporated teenagers into the soap to lure a young audience. Pictured is the show's original young cast, Gina Rossi (Josephine Davison), Kirsty Knight (Angela Dotchin), Stuart Neilson (Martin Henderson) and Nick Harrison (Karl Burnett).

The show's key demographic was female teenagers and therefore De Nave decided to incorporate several young teen characters into the programme. The producers hoped that the inclusion of warm, relatable teenagers who were involved in the community would provide relatability and role models for viewers. To entice young females, two teenage "heart throbs" were created, Stuart Neilson and Nick Harrison. Stuart was created as an articulate homosexual whilst Nick was a drug taking rebel. Martin Henderson and Karl Burnett won the roles, however Burnett's portrayal of Nick proved to be a lot more comedic and goofy than was initially imagined and the network started to worry that this would leave a gay male as the only remaining heart throb. To explain the scripts which saw Stuart rebuff the advances of a female, producers rewrote Stuart to be heavily religious instead of gay. Family units were also a key aspect of luring demographics and the characters of Nick and Stuart were built around a family unit, with the mothers of both children - Marj Neilson and Jenny Harrison - representing different ends of typical family life - Marj being a mother of a large steady family whilst Jenny was a single mother of one. Both characters were utilized to represent the strong matriarch De Nave envisioned. Other people working on the show were also credited for creating several characters: Jason Daniel primarily created the role of teenager Kirsty Knight, Ken Catran created Hone Ropata and De Nave herself created Meredith Fleming. Humour was also a large part in deciding the cast, with several characters having comedic elements to their stories, whilst others such as Marj and later Nick, were primarily comic relief.

== Departures ==
All actors were signed to an initial one-year contract and as soon as it ended, both Adrian Keeling (Tom Neilson) and Danielle Cormack (Alison Raynor) opted not to sign an extension. Both characters were written off shortly in 1993. Cormack later stated, "After a year I just wasn't interested in staying. I felt I learned all I could from that particular format". Later in the year, both Stephanie Wilkin (Meredith Fleming) and Lisa Crittenden (Carrie Burton) resigned, with the characters leaving in July and November respectively. In 1994, Nancy Brunning quit her role as Nurse Jaki Manu. When she had agreed to appear on the show, she had made a personal decision to only stay for two years. Not only that but Brunning was finding it a "challenge" as it was hard, "to sustain this character for two years, to remember everything she had done in the past and keep it consistent in the future." A month later, after Andrew Binns completed his agreed to two years working on the show, the popular character of Steve Mills (Andrew Binns) died in a high-profile car crash storyline that stunned the nation. The storyline was leaked to the press and newspapers featured speculation as to who had died. Just days later, Gina Rossi-Dodds (Josephine Davison) departed.

Throughout his time on the soap, Martin Henderson (Stuart Neilson) had begun to tire of his character and his story lines and in late 1994 he left the show to pursue a film career. Due to the character's popularity and his departure being leaked to the press, much speculation was made around his exit. Stuart made his last appearance in February 1995. Temuera Morrison (Hone Ropata) had also tired of the role and what he considered, "hands-in-pocket acting" and he quit, departing in mid 1995. Paul Gittins (Michael McKenna) also began to become exhausted by the constant workload needed to play Michael and he wanted diversity in his career. He quit the role and departed in mid 1995.

By late 1995, Michael Galvin (Chris Warner) was struggling with the amount of time he was spending playing Chris and decided to quit the show. He stated, "after four years on Shortland Street there was so much of me in Dr Warner I wasn’t sure where he ended and I began." Galvin departed alongside his onscreen brother Craig Parker (Guy Warner) in an episode written by Steven Zanoski in May 1996. Originally, the characters' departure was going to lead to the series' ultimate ending. However, the continued success led to further commissions and the show survived. Elizabeth McRae (Marj Brasch) had also begun to worry that audiences would not be able to recognize her in any other roles and she wished for diversity. She quit the role in 1995 with many months of notice for producers to write her out. Producers decided to write her out in a storyline where she became a politician. They saw this as a fun and unusual write out for a deserving fan favourite character. Marj made her last appearance as a regular character on 1 July 1996. Rene Naufahu (Sam Aleni) struggled with the fame associated with the show and in 1996, quit his role. He requested Sam be killed off however this never came to fruition and Sam made his final appearance in August 1996.

Following Naufahu's departure, there were only three remaining members of the original cast, Angela Dotchin (Kirsty Knight), Maggie Harper (Jenny Harrison) and Karl Burnett (Nick Harrison). However, in late 1997, Dotchin quit the show and Kirsty made her last appearance in early 1998. Harper quit her role several months later, saying she was pleased with the amount of spare time she had secured, stating, "The week I finished I was on my bike cycling away and I thought, 'Oh, I have no lines to learn, how wonderful'." In 2005, after a run of 13 years, Karl Burnett was axed from the soap. The character of Nick was reportedly no longer seen as an "asset" to the show. Nick made his last appearance in early 2005.

== Returns ==
Adrian Keeling (Tom Neilson) had quit the soap after just one year, but his exit storyline was left hugely ambiguous and he was struggling with the public constantly confronting him. He pleaded to be rewritten into the soap to explain his exit. Tom was reintroduced several months after leaving, only to be killed off after a week. Danielle Cormack (Alison Raynor) had also departed after her initial one-year contract but returned to the show within 12 months in a several week stint. After departing in 1993, Stephanie Wilkin (Meredith Fleming) returned just several months later in what proved to be a highly controversial storyline where Meredith started a relationship with another woman. She stayed on for several episodes. Josephine Davison (Gina Rossi-Dodds) returned for several episodes alongside screen husband Marton Csokas (Leonard Rossi-Dodds) in late 1994 just 9 months after leaving. Paul Gittins (Michael McKenna) returned in a guest role in 1997 for his on screen daughter Angela Bloomfield's (Rachel McKenna) storyline. Following Maggie Harper's (Jenny Harrison (Shortland Street)) resignation in 1998, Elizabeth McRae (Marj Brasch) agreed to reprise her role for several episodes to help write out the character of Jenny. Paul Gittins once again reprised the role of Michael McKenna as the year ended and stayed on for 3 months. His character was killed off in early 1999, dying from a series of heart attacks. In 2000, the soap underwent a major rejuvenation and as part of the creativity juggle, Michael Galvin (Chris Warner) was offered the chance to return after 4 years. To prove he could still play the role, Galvin had to reaudition. In 2002, Elizabeth McRae and Maggie Harper (Jenny Harrison) reprised their roles as part of Harper's on screen son, Karl Burnett's (Nick Harrison) on screen wedding.

In 2008, Temuera Morrison (Hone Ropata) reprised his role of Hone after 13 years to commemorate the show's 4000th episode for 6 weeks. In 2012, Elizabeth McRae reprised her role of Marj for a single episode to mark the show's 20th anniversary. Producers decided to bring Marj back after the return of another former receptionist Yvonne Jeffries (Alison Quigan), with producer Steven Zanoski stating: "With the return of Yvonne to the reception desk it was only a matter of course to have Marj back." Rene Naufahu had been asked to reprise his role as Sam Aleni multiple times following his departure in 1996 but never felt it was the right time. However, when asked to reprise the role in 2014 he accepted after learning what pleasure it would bring his mother. Sam made his return on 18 March 2014. Naufahu hoped the role would be long running and believed he could see himself on the soap for another 10 years.

To celebrate the show's 25th anniversary, several members of the original cast were asked to reprise their roles for a feature-length special. This included Karl Burnett, who returned to his role of Nick after 12 years, Elizabeth McRae, who again reprised her role as Marj, and Martin Henderson, who returned as Marj's son Stuart after 22 years.
