= Steve Mills (Shortland Street) =

Nurse Steve Mills
- Shortland Street character
- Portrayed by: Andrew Binns
- Duration: 1992–1994
- First appearance: 25 May 1992
- Last appearance: 25 March 1994
- Introduced by: Caterina De Nave
In-universe information
- Occupation: Nurse
- Father: Declan Kennedy
- Stepmother: Carrie Burton
- Brothers: Kieran Kennedy
- Sisters: Jessica Kennedy

Steve Mills (previously Kennedy) is a fictional character on the New Zealand soap opera Shortland Street. He was portrayed by Andrew Binns and was part of the original core cast.

The character appeared in the first ever episode and stayed on the soap for two years, leaving the show in a dramatic fashion, exploding in a car crash alongside best friend Sam's (Rene Naufahu) wife T.P Aleni (Elizabeth Skeen). His death is remembered as one of the most iconic deaths on the soap's history. The character was largely used for comedic relief, developing into more dramatic storylines as he neared his death. Initial storylines saw the clumsy Steve fall head over heels for beautiful nurse Sarah Donnelly (Madeleine Lynch) and his subsequent depression at her death. His final storyline saw Steve try to overcome the growing attraction to his step mother and boss Carrie Burton (Lisa Crittenden) and denial that her children were not his.

Steve has been described as "lovable" and a Shortland Street "favourite". His comedy has since set a benchmark on the soap, with many characters based on his original sensitive new age characterisation, including Lionel Skeggins (John Leigh), Mike Galloway (Oliver Driver) and Kip Denton (Will Hall).

== Storylines ==
Steve is introduced in May 1992 in the first Shortland Street episode as the prankster nurse and flatmate to Sam Aleni (Rene Naufahu). Steve works under the reign of the mercilessly bossy Carrie Burton (Lisa Crittenden) and has an infatuation with Alison Raynor (Danielle Cormack). Steve is thrilled when Alison moves in but after the two share a kiss, they remain friends. Always loyal to Steve is his pet dog Killer, but in late 1992 the dog is diagnosed with diabetes. Steve falls for Sarah Donnelly (Madeleine Lynch) and the two start to date. Sarah reveals she has cancer however and dies in Steve's arms at her birthday party.

In 1993, Steve grows depressed over Sarah's death and is shocked when his father Declan Kennedy (Kevin J. Wilson) arrived in town. The estranged father and son were at odds with Steve believing Declan had murdered his mother. Steve and other characters donated sperm to polar opposite Carrie, so she could have children. Carrie and Declan ended up falling in love and getting married but when the babies were born, Declan was too distracted with the bar and his criminal associates to father them and Steve willingly gave up his time to help his possible kids. Spending time with the Burtons, Steve fell in love with Carrie, but she was receiving threats from Declan's criminal past and with Declan being held on remand, Carrie grew close to Steve. Carrie decided to flee however and she and Steve shared a kiss in late 1993.

Carrie’s absence from the clinic triggered Steve to be more interested in his career interviewing to be the Acting Director of Nursing. Steve lost role to Paul Churchill who promptly identified Steve as a threat to his infatuation with young Nurse Jo Jordan (Greer Robson). Using Steve’s tardiness due to supporting Carrie and the kids, Paul had Steve fired. Steve was soon rehired as a Charge Nurse following Paul’s dismissal for sexual harassment. Steve seemed inspired to carry on Carrie's legacy in leadership, much to the annoyance of his colleagues.

Steve is killed in an iconic car explosion in early 1994.

Steve started off 1994 with positive spirits - he was in love with Carrie and was planning to propose to her when she returned for Declan's upcoming trial. Steve was hopeful that upon returning to the clinic from a visit to Carrie and the kids in February, he would be the new Senior Charge Nurse and would be running the nursing department. However, he returned to find out that whilst he was successful in becoming the new Senior Charge, he would be reporting to a new Director of Nursing, Ellen Crozier (Robyn Malcolm). This led to some initial conflict as Steve undermined Ellen’s authority. Further disappointment followed when one of the triplets was diagnosed with a rare form of cancer and his blood type was not a match - meaning he could not be the father. After catching Chris Warner (Michael Galvin) out, he learnt that Chris had really been visiting Carrie as he was the father of the babies. Steve then received a visit from Police as Declan had escaped custody and most likely fled the country. The following day a parcel arrived with a message from Declan and enclosed a locket that belonged to Steve's mother.

In March 1994, Steve grew suspicious of Chris spending time with close friend Jo, who was in a relationship with Stuart Neilson (Martin Henderson). Chris was in a particularly promiscuous phase and Steve believed Jo was being taken advantage of. Steve was infuriated and while driving back from Leonard (Marton Csokas) and Gina's (Josephine Davison) farewell party, the two got into an argument and Steve accidentally drove the car off the road. Steve, Chris and Kirsty (Angela Dotchin) escaped but Steve went back for T.P (Elizabeth Skeen), only to be caught in the car as it violently exploded.

Steve and TP's death weighed heavily on Sam from the rest of his time on the soap, with his personality and appearance changing to a more ruthless and selfish persona gradually. Carrie would be willed the ownership to Steve's old house, and a dual funeral would be held a few days later for Steve and TP, where eulogies were given by Dr McKenna (Paul Gittins), Nick (Karl Burnett), Sam and Sam's brother Nat (Joseph Naufahu). Steve's good friend Carmen (Theresa Healey) spent some of her lottery winnings on a memoriam for Steve and TP When Shortland Street clinic had a renovation, a memorial plaque was placed on a fish tank labelled "dedicated to Steve Mills."

== Reception ==
The scene featuring Steve and TP's death as voted by fans as one of the most iconic scenes of the soap. Steve was described at the time of his death as "One of Shortland Street's favourite characters".
