= List of Shortland Street characters introduced in 1992 =

The following is a list of characters that first appeared in the New Zealand soap opera Shortland Street in 1992, by order of first appearance.

== Marj Neilson ==
Marj Neilson was the clinic's first receptionist and was portrayed by Elizabeth McRae. A religious busy body and gossip, Marj became a staple and iconic of the show, being the shows original matriarch and leader of the Neilson family unit. She stayed on the show until 1996 and still remains one of the most iconic characters, returning for several guest stints.

== Tom Neilson ==
Tom Leslie Neilson was the husband of Marj and the show's original paramedic. Tom stayed on the show for a year and his story lines covered illness and the hugely famous missing person scenario where Tom left his family and went into hiding, then later died of a heartattack

== Sam Aleni ==
Sam Aleni was the Samoan paramedic who appeared on the show for 4 years. The casting of Sam proved groundbreaking, placing a Polynesian in the occupation of paramedic, with there being only one real life case in New Zealand. Rene Naufahu portrayed Sam, with his younger brother Joe Naufahu playing Sam's brother Nat.

== Lisa Stanton ==
Lisa Stanton
- Shortland Street character
- Portrayed by: Anne Cathie
- Duration: 1992
- First appearance: 25 May 1992; Episode 1
- Last appearance: 3 June 1992
- Introduced by: Caterina De Nave
In-universe information
- Daughters: Rebecca Stanton

Lisa Stanton was the teenage girl who gave birth in the show's first ever episode. Originally thought to be the celibate Stuart's (Martin Henderson) lover, it soon turned out Lisa's baby daughter was really Stuart's married brother - Darryl's (Mark Ferguson).

== Stuart Neilson ==
Stuart Neilson was the teenage son of Marj and Tom who went from being a shy devout Catholic, to a sturdy business man. The character was portrayed by Martin Henderson from the first episode up until early 1995.

== Carrie Burton ==
Carrie Burton
- Shortland Street character
- Portrayed by: Lisa Crittenden
- Duration: 1992–93
- First appearance: 25 May 1992
- Last appearance: 11 November 1993
- Introduced by: Caterine De Nave
In-universe information
- Occupation: Nursing Manager at Shortland Street (1989–93)
- Husband: Declan Kennedy (1993-2005); John Connelly (until 2013)
- Sons: Finn Warner; Frank Warner
- Daughters: Sarah Warner

Carrie Burton was the strict director of nursing, played by Lisa Crittenden. She was part of the original cast and appeared from the first episode up until November the following year.

In 1992 Carrie was accused of helping Sam's (Rene Naufahu) cousin to die and was arrested but not charged. The stress of the accusation led Carrie to date hospital CEO - Michael (Paul Gittins). The relationship didn't last and Carrie briefly dated a builder through the new year. Desperate to have children, Carrie decided to get a colleague to donate his sperm and accepted samples from Chris (Michael Galvin), Steve (Andrew Binns), Hone Ropata (Temuera Morrison) and Guy (Craig Parker). Carrie fell pregnant and started to date Steve's mysterious father - Declan (Kevin J. Wilson). The two married in Las Vegas and bought the local bar in Carrie's name. Carrie gave birth to triplets in September but received little support from Declan and ended up relying on Steve. The two eventually admitted their mutual feelings following the revelation Declan was a criminal. However blackmail from Declan's dodgy associates made Carrie flee to Australia with her three children after one final kiss with Steve.

Carrie was referenced frequently early in 1994 as Steve continued to develop romantic feelings for her and a sense of fatherhood for the children. Carrie was expected to return to Ferndale for Declan’s trial, however Sarah developed cancer resulting in Carrie cancelling their trip. Following Declan escaping custody and the country, and Steve’s death in a car accident in March, Carrie saw no reason to return to New Zealand. Steve bequeathed his house to Carrie and the children, which she eventually sold in December to Ellen Crozier (Robyn Malcolm).

In November 1995, Chris visited Carrie and the triplets so that he could introduce his father Bruce (Ken Blackburn) to them before he died.

Carrie's son Finn (Lukas Whiting) returns to Ferndale in 2016 to meet his father and announces that Carrie has recently died from breast cancer.

== Tara Milburn ==
Tara Milburn
- Shortland Street character
- Portrayed by: Krista Nobilo
- Duration: 1992
- First appearance: 25 May 1992; Episode 1
- Last appearance: 26 May 1992; Episode 2
- Introduced by: Caterina De Nave

Tara Milburn was a petty thief who faked an injury so she could steal from the hospital. She appeared in a two episode stint that resulted in her confession.

== Alison Raynor ==
Alison Raynor
- Shortland Street character
- Portrayed by: Danielle Cormack
- Duration: 1992–93
- First appearance: 25 May 1992; Episode 1
- Last appearance: 30 December 1993; Episode 419
- Introduced by: Caterina De Nave (1992); Tony Holden (1993)
In-universe information
- Other names: Alison Mafart (married name); Alison Warner (married name)
- Father: Kevin Raynor
- Mother: Irene Raynor
- Husband: Jean-Luc Mafart (1993); Chris Warner (1997-2001)
- Sons: Phoenix Raynor Finn Warner (stepson) Frank Warner (stepson) Harry Warner (stepson) Trinity Kwan (stepdaughter)
- Granddaughters: Amelie Warner
- Uncles: Brian Raynor

Alison Raynor was one of the show's original nurses portrayed by Danielle Cormack and was part of the series original cast. Cormack enjoyed the experience at first, but after a year was sick of the show and decided to leave. She was the second original character to leave after Tom Neilson (Adrian Keeling). In 2010, whilst times were hard, Cormack considered returning to the show only to find out her character had been killed off.

Alison moved to Ferndale in mid 1992 from her farming hometown in the Waikato and moved in with two men Sam (Rene Naufahu) and Steve (Andrew Binns) much to the shock of her conservative parents. Alison soon fell for the charms of Chris (Michael Galvin) but they broke up due to his womanising ways. Enjoying single life in the city, Alison soon fell victim to a stalker Philip Cotton (Scott Wills) and reconciled with Chris when the stalking lead to a near kidnapping. Alison struggled with the differences she shared with Chris and his past girlfriends, and grew close to his brother Guy (Craig Parker). After kissing Guy, Alison left Chris, only to reconcile and get engaged shortly after. This was short-lived with Chris leaving Alison for his ex-wife Melanie (Tina Regtien), only to discover she was pregnant. In 1993 Alison tragically suffered a miscarriage and grew close to the villainous Darryl (Mark Ferguson). However she rejected Darryl's advances and reunited with Chris and soon the two got engaged. However Darryl drugged Chris and prevented him from attending the ceremony and Alison fled Ferndale in tears at the apparent betrayal. Jaki (Nancy Brunning) later attended Alison's wedding overseas to a French man. Alison returned in late 1993 seeking plastic surgery so she would be unrecognisable to her husband - Jean-Luc (Pierre Foret) who had turned out to be abusive and a terrorist. Alison ended up being confronted by Jean-Luc at her family farm and while attempting to kill his wife, Jean-Luc tripped and fell to his death. Alison soon left the country once again.

In 1997 Tiffany Pratt (Alison James) reported the end to her marriage with Chris after discovering him in bed with Alison. Chris and Alison later married but divorced soon after. In 2010 it was revealed that Alison had died the previous year but in 1996, had given birth to Chris' son Phoenix Raynor (Geordie Holibar) following their separation.

== Hone Ropata ==
Dr. Hone Ropata was the no nonsense doctor played by Temuera Morrison. Hone often found himself playing against the rules and remained on the show until 1995. The character made a high-profile return for the show's 4000th episode in 2008.

== Kirsty Knight ==
Kirsty Knight was the "blonde bombshell" who worked the reception desk opposite Marj. Played by Angela Dotchin from 1992 to 1998, the character picked up an icon status and remains as one of the most iconic characters to feature on the soap.

== Michael McKenna ==
Dr. Michael McKenna was the CEO of the clinic who was portrayed by Paul Gittins up until 1995. He returned in guest stints in both 1997 and 1998 and remains known as the patriarch of the McKenna family which produced the iconic character - Rachel (Angela Bloomfield).

== Chris Warner ==
Dr. Chris Warner was the playboy doctor who went by the nickname "Dr. Love". Chris was portrayed by Michael Galvin up until 1996. However the character returned 4 years later and remains presently, being the longest running character to appear on the show.

== Jill Johnstone ==
Jill Johnstone
- Shortland Street character
- Portrayed by: Suzy Aiken
- Duration: 1992
- First appearance: 25 May 1992; Episode 1
- Last appearance: 10 June 1992; Episode 13
- Introduced by: Caterina De Nave
In-universe information
- Occupation: Fitness trainer

Jill Johnstone was the fitness trainer who had a brief affair with Chris Warner (Michael Galvin). Jill's husband caused grief at the clinic shortly afterwards, attacking Hone Ropata (Temuera Morrison) believing him to be sleeping with her. Chris and Jill later reunited much to Steve's (Andrew Binns) shock due to Alison (Danielle Cormack) having had recently begun dating Chris.

Jill and Chris' sex scene in the first episode remains as heavily iconic and has been stated as setting the tone for the rest of the series.

== Steve Mills ==
Steve Mills was the joker nurse who was played by Andrew Binns from 1992 up until the characters iconic death in 1994.

== Rebecca Stanton ==
Rebecca Stanton
- Shortland Street character
- Portrayed by: Bronte Bell
- Duration: 1992
- First appearance: 25 May 1992; Episode 1
- Last appearance: 3 June 1992
- Introduced by: Caterina De Nave
In-universe information
- Father: Darryl Neilson
- Mother: Lisa Stanton
- Grandfathers: Tom Neilson
- Grandmothers: Marj Brasch
- Uncles: Damien Neilson; Patrick Neilson; Stuart Neilson
- Aunts: Jane Fitzgerald

Rebecca Stanton was the baby born during Shortland Street's first episode. Paramedic Tom Neilson (Adrian Keeling) was shocked when he brought in the teenaged Lisa Stanton (Anne Cathie) to carry out an emergency birth and his young son Stuart (Martin Henderson) claimed to be the father. In reality the true father was Stuart's married elder brother Darryl (Mark Ferguson) who had paid Lisa off after an affair. Stuart's upset mother Marj (Elizabeth McRae) later visited Lisa and learned the baby had been named Rebecca, and was not fathered by Stuart. Lisa and Rebecca soon left Ferndale so to avoid Darryl.

In 2024 upon the original series release online, The Spinoff website sought to locate the actress of Rebecca. After a 2 week search, Bronte Bell, a skin technician living in London was soon identified as the "mystery baby" and expressed interest in making a cameo reappearance on the show.

== Jenny Harrison ==
Jenny Harrison (previously Seymour) was the original personal assistant to CEO Michael McKenna (Paul Gittins). Played by Maggie Harper, she was a divorcee who had suffered abuse from her husband and mothered his son - Nick (Karl Burnett).

== Nick Harrison ==
Nick Harrison was the mischievous son of Jenny (Maggie Harper) and on/off best friend of Stuart (Martin Henderson). Portrayed by Karl Burnett, Nick stayed on the show until 2005, making him the longest running original character.

== Gina Rossi ==
Gina Rossi-Dodds
- Shortland Street character
- Portrayed by: Josephine Davison
- Duration: 1992–95, 2026
- First appearance: 26 May 1992; Episode 2
- Introduced by: Caterine De Nave (1992); Tony Holden (1994); Oliver Driver (2026)
In-universe information
- Other names: Susan
- Occupation: Owner of Stromboli Cafeteria (1989–95); Actor on Tides of the Heart (1994—)
- Husband: Leonard Dodds (1993—)
- Sons: Leonardo Rossi-Dodds
- Uncles: Vinnie Rossi
- First cousins: Caudie Rossi

Gina Rossi-Dodds (also Rossi) is the eccentric owner of the clinic cafe. Played by Josephine Davison, Gina appeared until 1994, appearing again later in the year.

Gina is introduced as the eccentric cafe worker across the street from the clinic, and had previously been infatuated with nurse Steve Mills (Andrew Binns) and soon became infatuated with hunky new doctor - Hone Ropata (Temuera Morrison), but the arrival of Leonard Dodds (Marton Csokas) in 1993 sent Gina into a smitten obsession and the two started to date. When the cafe became available to be purchased, Gina entered into a partnership with Dr Chris Warner (Michael Galvin), who frequently had different views on how his investment should be run.

When Leonard temporarily relocated for a research project, Gina became flatmates with Hone, resparking her interest in him and once Leonard returned, he couldn't forgive Gina and they broke up. The two eventually reconciled but Gina refused to get married due to the "Shortland Street curse" where no weddings could go to plan. However Michael (Paul Gittins) encouraged the two and they ended up getting married in November 1993. They bought a houseboat together and after Leonard cured his sea sickness, the two tried for children. However Gina learned she had low fertility, and following an ectopic pregnancy the two decided to move California for Leonard to pursue a research position at UCLA. Chris and Gina disagreed with who should fill in for Gina at the cafe - Chris suggesting Marilyn Buck whilst Gina wanted her Uncle Vinny. Leonard broke the deadlock by presenting a third option in the form of his best friend Lionel (John Leigh).

They returned later that year to be bridesmaid and bestman at Lionel and Kirsty's (Angela Dotchin) wedding. However Gina had become a soap star whilst overseas and her presence brought paparazzi to the service. After the wedding's second attempt in early 1995 and with Gina’s acting career taking off, Gina sold her stake in the cafe to Lionel and said goodbye to Ferndale forever with Leonard. In late 1995 it was announced that the couple had a son named Leonardo.

== Jaki Manu ==
Jaki Manu
- Shortland Street character
- Portrayed by: Nancy Brunning
- Duration: 1992–94
- First appearance: 26 May 1992; Episode 2
- Last appearance: 28 February 1994; Episode 461
- Introduced by: Caterine De Nave
In-universe information
- Occupation: Nurse
- Father: Ernie Manu
- Mother: Betty Manu
- Sisters: Moana Taylor
- Nieces: Wiki Taylor

Jaki Manu was the busybody and efficient nurse. She was portrayed by Nancy Brunning until 1994. In 1992 controversy struck when Jaki was pricked by a needle from an HIV patient - Deborah (Lisa Chappell). Ostracized by her peers, Jaki was relieved when she was finally cleared of the illness. She started to date Black Caps cricketer - Henry (Tamati Rice) and started to managed his career. However, when he brought an infectious disease into the clinic and cheated on her with his new publicist, the relationship was over.

In 1993, the clinic expanded with a new wing that introduced new senior nursing roles and Jaki became Charge Nurse for the new ward. It took time for Jaki to readjust her working relationships. During the winter it is revealed that Jaki and two of her relatives were part of an 1980s girl group, reuniting to perform for her mother’s birthday. When Carrie left for maternity leave, Jacki came second to external candidate to Paul Churchill to be the Acting Director of Nursing. Jaki grew close to Rob Hawkins (Patrick Griffiths) but refused to help him euthanise his sick wife Dani. He later killed Dani during a subsequent hospital stay, and attempted to start a relationship with Jaki however the guilt got to her and they broke up. Paul attempted to blackmail Jaki over the relationship in an effort to stop her from reporting his indecent behaviour to the clinic’s management. After Paul was fired, and Carrie having fled the country, Jaki was offered the new permanent role of Senior Charge Nurse in lieu of the Director of Nursing position being readvertised. Whilst this was technically a promotion, it was still a lower title and less pay than what a Director of Nursing role would offer, despite the similarities in the duties and responsibilities - however it was the only role Michael was willing to budget for at the time. The year finished with Jaki providing safe harbour to Alison, who had secretly reentered the country in attempt to escape from her sinister husband.

Jaki was shocked to see Henry come into hospital in early 1994. Following a recent successful tour, Henry required surgery on his knee. After coming into conflict with Henry’s latest publicist, Henry and Jaki reunited whilst Henry recovered on the ward. One evening in early February, Jaki took a phone order for medication from Dr Chris Warner resulting in a dosing error and serious incident for Henry’s roommate. Jaki was soon made the scapegoat for the error. To avoid the incident being referred to the nursing council, and facing potential deregistration as a nurse, Jaki accepted a demotion to a staff nurse position. The role change gave her a chance for reflection and soon turned down the opportunity to return to the Senior Charge Nurse role as well as an offer to become Director of Nursing as part of a new direction for the clinic. Jaki instead applied to Guy’s Hospital in London for a clinical specialist course. With Henry planning to play in the English summer county competition, the two left Ferndale together.

== Meredith Fleming ==
Dr. Meredith Fleming
- Shortland Street character
- Portrayed by: Stephanie Wilkin
- Duration: 1992–94
- First appearance: 26 May 1992; Episode 2
- Last appearance: 29 July 1994; Episode 570
- Introduced by: Caterina De Nave (1992); Tony Holden (1994)
In-universe information
- Occupation: Doctor of Medicine
- Mother: Audrey Fleming
- Sons: Andrew Fleming

Dr. Meredith Fleming was the single mother new doctor in Ferndale portrayed by Stephanie Wilkin until 1993 and again in 1994. The character became famous as being part of the shows first lesbian storyline.

=== Storylines ===
Meredith arrived in town in May 1992 and soon got involved with Hone Ropata (Temuera Morrison). The romance was short and she briefly dated Guy Warner (Craig Parker), making Guy's brother - Chris (Michael Galvin) jealous. Meredith's young son - Andrew (Ezra Wood) soon arrived on her door step and she got back together with Hone.

However into 1993, the two broke up and Andrew's father kidnapped him, eventually leading to Andrew being placed in Meredith's mothers care. A distraught Meredith ended up with Guy and the two eventually decided to leave Ferndale. However the revelation that Guy had cheated on Meredith with Jenny (Maggie Harper) separated the two. Meredith supports Carrie with her attempts to become a mother, even participating in a baby referral program when Carrie was considering adoption. When former colleague Shane Raskin joins the clinic, Meredith began to think more about her career and announced her intention to move to Dunedin to take a up role specialising in obstetrics. Meredith got shot protecting guy from an abusive partner of a patient. An injured Meredith forgave Guy, and toyed with starting a relationship with Chris before choosing to depart to Dunedin alone.

When Hone disappears at short notice during mid-1994, Meredith returns as a locum GP and with a secret project to launch an IVF clinic at Shortland Street. Chris was eager to resume their relationship however Meredith found herself attracted to clinic nurse Annie Flynn (Rebecca Hobbs). The two eventually started to date and faced judgement from Marj (Elizabeth McRae) however her prejudice was later revealed to be based upon guilt from losing a close friend during high school. With the clinic up and running, Meredith decided to return to Dunedin with Annie.

== Deborah Walters ==
Deborah Walters
- Shortland Street character
- Portrayed by: Lisa Chappell
- Duration: 1992–94
- First appearance: 29 May 1992; Episode 5
- Last appearance: 6 January 1994; Episode 424
- Introduced by: Caterina De Nave (1992); Tony Holden (1993)

Deborah Walters was the HIV patient who was a patient at the clinic. She starred in a high-profile ethical storyline in May 1992 when a needle used on her accidentally pricked Jaki Manu (Nancy Brunning). The two became friends and Jaki was eventually cleared of the illness. Deborah returned in late 1993 wanting plastic surgery. Michael (Paul Gittins) advised her against the operation due to her HIV and she eventually agreed not to go through with it. Whilst in the clinic, she developed a friendship with Guy Warner (Craig Parker) and the two briefly dated before she departed once again.

== Bruce Warner ==
Sir Bruce Warner was the arrogant father of Chris Warner (Michael Galvin). He was played by Ken Blackburn for numerous stints in the nineties.

== Margot Warner ==
Margot, Lady Warner
- Shortland Street character
- Portrayed by: Glynis McNicoll (1992–97); Dinah Priestley (2003)
- Duration: 1992–97, 2003
- First appearance: 5 November 1992
- Last appearance: 24 April 2003
- Introduced by: Caterina De Nave (1992); Brian Lenanne (1993); Tony Holden (1994); Gavin Strawhan (1995); Simon Bennett (1996, 1997); Harriet Crampton (2003)
In-universe information
- Brothers: Desmond Worthington; Garth Worthington
- Husband: Sir Bruce Warner
- Sons: Chris Warner
- Daughters: Amanda Warner
- Adoptive sons: Guy Warner
- Grandsons: Frank Warner; Finn Warner; Phoenix Warner; Harry Warner; James Warner
- Granddaughters: Sass Warner; Tuesday Warner; Kelly Piper (possibly); Trinity Kwan
- Nephews: Isaac Worthington
- Other relatives: Xun Warner; Amelie Warner

Margot, Lady Warner (also Worthington) is the alcoholic mother of Chris Warner (Michael Galvin). She was portrayed by Glynis McNicoll between 1992 and 2997 and by Dinah Priestley for her death in 2003.

Guy (Craig Parker) and Chris' girlfriend Alison (Danielle Cormack) visited Margot in late 1992 and she expressed her upset at husband - Bruce (Ken Blackburn) withholding money for her charity work. The following year Margot was shocked to learn her daughter, Amanda (Stephanie Jack) was still alive with Bruce claiming she had died at birth. The loveless marriage took a toll on Margot and she turned to alcohol and Guy (Craig Parker) convinced her to seek help. At the alcoholic help groups, she befriended Bruce's rival - Michael McKenna (Paul Gittins) and many suspected an affair. Margot returned for Guys birthday in 1994 and expressed concern at Chris' interracial relationship with Rebecca Frost (Luisa Burgess). In 1995 following Bruce's death, Margot confessed she was not Guy's biological mother but nonetheless was thrilled with the arrival of his daughter - Tuesday (uncredited actress). In 1996 she attended Chris's wedding and soon attempted to bond with her new daughter-in-law Tiffany (Alison James) by engaging her to do charity work. Margot was devastated when Chris took a job in New York and Guy joined him to seek medical treatment for Tuesday. After Tiffany returned in 1997 from a trip to Chris and discovered his affair with Alison, Margot tried to convince Tiffany to take Chris back. However after she discovers Tiffany had a brief fling with Johnny Marinovich (Stelios Yiakmis), Margot took a harder stance and kicked Tiffany out of Chris’s Ferndale apartment. Despite interference from Tiffany’s parents wanting to get money from the Warners, Tiffany and Margot ultimately made peace with each other and Margot sold the apartment to Emily Devine (Michaela Rooney).

In 2003 a very sick Margot reappeared and became friendly with Dom (Shane Cortese). Chris suspected Dom was after his mother's money and when she succumbed to her cancer, was shocked that Dom was included in her will. It was soon revealed that Margot had discovered Dom was the result of an affair Bruce had, meaning he was Chris' half-brother. This was later disproven but as a result of bitter jealousy, Dom carried out a long-term smear campaign against Chris and attempted to murder him. In 2014, Chris' newborn daughter Trinity (Maya Ruriko Doura) was given the middle-name of Margot in her grandmothers honour.

== Claire Lloyd ==
Claire Lloyd
- Shortland Street character
- Portrayed by: Annie Stanford
- Duration: 1992
- First appearance: 1 July 1992; Episode 28
- Last appearance: 13 August 1992; Episode 59
- Introduced by: Caterina De Nave

Claire Lloyd was the cheating fiancé of Hone Ropata (Temuera Morrison). The two got engaged prior to the first episode and she was the reason Hone moved to Ferndale. However she started an affair with both Chris Warner (Michael Galvin) and Michael McKenna (Paul Gittins), which resulted in Hone dumping her.

== Irene Raynor ==
Irene Raynor
- Shortland Street character
- Portrayed by: Jan Saussey
- Duration: 1992–93
- First appearance: 13 July 1992; Episode 37
- Last appearance: 1 June 1993; Episode 267
- Introduced by: Caterina De Nave (1992); Brian Lenanne (1993)
In-universe information
- Husband: Kevin Raynor
- Daughters: Alison Raynor
- Grandsons: Phoenix Raynor

Irene Raynor was the nosey mother of Alison Raynor (Danielle Cormack). She was portrayed by Jan Saussey in two stints in 1992 and 1993. She first appeared in 1992 and discovered Alison was flatting with two male flatmates.She was less fazed by this than her husband and ended up staying with them for an extended holiday whilst her husband returned home. Her friendship with Tom Neilson (Adrian Keeling) led many to believe the two were having an affair and resulted in Marj (Elizabeth McRae) confronting Irene, however this was not the case and the two were simply friends. Irene returned in 1993 to witness her daughters marriage to Chris Warner (Michael Galvin) however when Chris did not show, Irene escorted her daughter to the airport to depart Ferndale.

== Kevin Raynor ==
Kevin Raynor
- Shortland Street character
- Portrayed by: Laurie Dee
- Duration: 1992–93
- First appearance: 13 July 1992; Episode 37
- Last appearance: 1 June 1993; Episode 267
- Introduced by: Caterina De Nave (1992); Brian Lenanne (1993)
In-universe information
- Brothers: Brian Raynor
- Wife: Irene Raynor
- Daughters: Alison Raynor
- Grandsons: Phoenix Raynor

Kevin Raynor was the father of Alison Raynor (Danielle Cormack). He appeared alongside his wife for stints in both 1992 and 1993. He was disgusted in 1992 when he discovered Alison was flatting with two males. In 1993 he and Irene drove Alison to the airport following the belief Chris (Michael Galvin) had abandoned her at the altar.

In 2010 Kevin's brother Brian (Ian Mune) arrived on the show in a recurring guest role.

== Andrew Fleming ==
Andrew Fleming
- Shortland Street character
- Portrayed by: Ezra Wood
- Duration: 1992–93
- First appearance: 17 July 1992; Episode 40
- Last appearance: June 1993
- Introduced by: Caterina De Nave
In-universe information
- Father: David Menzies
- Mother: Meredith Fleming
- Grandmothers: Audrey Fleming

Andrew Fleming was the young son of Meredith Fleming (Stephanie Wilkin). Andrew was raised by his grandparents but came to live with Meredith in mid-1992. However several problems arose such as Andrew going missing and accidentally shooting himself in the head. However the presence of Meredith's boyfriend Hone Ropata (Temuera Morrison) proved calming for the child. However, after getting to know his father, Andrew ended up getting kidnapped by him and following Meredith being blamed, Andrew returned to his grandparents.

== Eddie Tali ==
Eddie Tali
- Shortland Street character
- Duration: 1992
- First appearance: 31 July 1992
- Last appearance: 10 August 1992
In-universe information
- Father: Sebastian Tali
- First cousins: Sam Aleni; Nat Aleni

Eddie Tali appeared for a week in mid 1992. Eddie was sportsman cousin of Sam Aleni (Rene Naufahu) who was pulled from a train wreck. Paralysed from the neck down, Eddie fell into a deep depression and made it clear he wanted help to die from Sam, Nurse Jaki Manu (Nancy Brunning), Hone Ropata (Temuera Morrison), and his best friend. Ultimately Eddie was overdosed on insulin by a gloved assailant and died, leading to a whodunnit from those he confessed to alongside a mysterious fake Priest and Charge Nurse Carrie Burton (Lisa Crittenden). Carrie was charged with his murder when a needle was found with her finger prints and a similar previous death she was involved with arose. With staff beginning to suspect Sam, he worked out Eddie's best friend was trying to frame him and was the true culprit, leading to a confession and an arrest.

== George Bentley ==
George Bentley
- Shortland Street character
- Portrayed by: Bruce Allpress
- Duration: 1992–93
- First appearance: 11 August 1992
- Last appearance: 5 July 1993
- Introduced by: Caterina De Nave (1992); Brian Lenanne (1993)
In-universe information
- Wife: May McKenna (1992–?)
- Daughters: Annette Bently
- Stepsons: Michael McKenna

George Bentley appeared in guest stints in both 1992 and 1993. Nick Harrison (Karl Burnett) met George when he began volunteering at the local retirement village. George quickly grew close to the teenager and led him astray, hosting boozy parties and attempting to leave the village by any means necessary. He grew close to Nick and his mother Jenny (Maggie Harper), attempting to move in with them. When the Shortland Street clinic Director Michael's (Paul Gittins) mother May (Mary De Koster) was admitted with pneumonia, George accompanied her as a loving partner and quickly got offside with her son. The two got engaged and Michael was convinced George was after the McKenna family money. George proved he loved her and the two married. The following year George was hospitalised for varicose vein surgery and angered Michael when he revealed he and May had been growing cannabis in their garden. This was for medicinal use after George had developed glaucoma, but ended up being stolen by Nick.

== May McKenna ==
May McKenna
- Shortland Street character
- Portrayed by: Mary De Koster
- Duration: 1992–1993
- First appearance: 21 August 1992
- Last appearance: 5 July 1993
- Introduced by: Caterina De Nave
In-universe information
- Husband: George Bentley (1992–?)
- Sons: Michael McKenna
- Daughters: Shirley McKenna
- Stepdaughters: Annette Bently
- Grandsons: Jonathon McKenna
- Granddaughters: Rachel McKenna

Mavis "May" Bentley (previously McKenna) first appeared as the elderly girlfriend of George Bentley (Bruce Allpress) who would offer his solace from his retirement village. She was later admitted to the clinic upon falling over with pneumonia symptoms, only for all to be shocked when she was revealed as the mother of clinic director Michael McKenna (Paul Gittins). May's condition worsened and she surprised Michael when she announced she was to marry George. Aware that his mother was near death, Michael assumed George was after her money and opposed. However this turned out not to be the case and the two married with Michael's blessing. May returned the following year to support George who was undergoing varicose vein surgery. Michael was shocked when he learned May had been growing cannabis and baking George drug-infused cookies for his glaucoma. May was furious when the cannabis was stolen, assuming Michael had done this whereas the true culprit was revealed to be Jo's (Greer Robson) delinquent younger brother Mark (Scott Harman) who had stolen them to sell while leaving Nick (Karl Burnett) to take the blame. In 2011, it was stated that Rachel (Angela Bloomfield) and Jonathon (Kieren Hutchison) were the last remaining McKennas alive, suggesting May had died.

== Sarah Donnelly ==
Sarah Donnelly
- Shortland Street character
- Portrayed by: Madeleine Lynch
- Duration: 1992
- First appearance: 9 September 1992; Episode 78
- Last appearance: 16 December 1992; Episode 148
- Introduced by: Caterina De Nave

Sarah Donnelly was a fun loving nurse and love interest for Steve Mills (Andrew Binns). She arrived in mid-1992 and instantly attracted the attentions of prankster nurse - Steve. Initially hesitant to enter a relationship with the immature nurse, she eventually fell in love and the two dated for several months. However late in the year whilst Steve talked marriage, Sarah revealed she had terminal melanoma. Sad and desperate to impress, Steve threw Sarah a birthday party in December 1992 only for Sarah to die in his arms.

== Noel Sturgess ==
Noel Sturgess
- Shortland Street character
- Portrayed by: Martyn Sanderson
- Duration: 1992–94
- First appearance: 10 September 1992
- Last appearance: 12 May 1994
- Introduced by: Caterina De Nave (1992); Brian Lenanne (1993); Tony Holden (1994)
In-universe information
- Occupation: Primary share holder of Shortland Street clinic (1989–94)
- Daughters: Hilary Sturgess

Noel Sturgess appeared sporadically throughout the shows first 3 years. He was the primary share holder of the Shortland Street clinic. He arrived to the hospital as a patient requiring heart surgery in mid-1992 and instantly came across as gross and creepy to the young women staff. He took a liking to doctor - Chris Warner (Michael Galvin) and showed sexual interest in Kirsty (Angela Dotchin). He hired Kirsty as his temporary personal assistant in the clinic and sexually harassed Carrie (Lisa Crittenden). He offered Kirsty a full-time contract and left when she declined. He returned the following year after the nurses went on strike, concerned about the way clinic director Dr Michael McKenna (Paul Gittins) managed the situation and more importantly- his investment. He considered selling out the hospital but ended up keeping his shares.

In 1994 Noel returned upon hearing that his daughter Hilary (Susan Brady) had become interested in the clinic and had obtained Michael McKenna’s shares. Noel was sceptical of Hilary’s financial scheme for the clinic. Whilst Noel started to bond with Jenny (Maggie Harper), it soon became apparent there was animosity on both sides with Hilary and Noel, neither approving of the other’s business tactics. The source of the conflict was revealed to be about Noel’s treatment of Hilary’s mother. Jenny questioned Noel about his late wife and he admitted he treated her poorly. Noel had a heart attack and died later that evening, his death announced by Hilary at a shareholders meeting the next day. His shares of the hospital were given to Hilary.

Martyn Sanderson found it difficult playing such a hard nosed and unpleasant character but knew it was part of the job. His only request was that when his character was to be killed off, he wanted Noel to die off screen so as not to scare his grandchildren.

== Barry Harrison ==
Barry Harrison
- Shortland Street character
- Portrayed by: Alistair Browning
- Duration: 1992
- First appearance: 5 October 1992; Episode 96
- Last appearance: 24 November 1992; Episode 132
- Introduced by: Caterina De Nave
In-universe information
- Brothers: Ian Harrison
- Wife: Jenny Harrison (until 1983)
- Sons: Nick Harrison

Barry Harrison was the abusive former husband of Jenny Harrison (Maggie Harper) and father of Nick (Karl Burnett). Nick contacted Barry in October 1992 and invited him over to try breakup Jenny who had begun dating his teacher. Barry and Jenny reunited however in November, Barry hit Jenny and she broke up with him. It later turned out Barry had abused Jenny for years and was a cause for their divorce.

== Miles Lucas ==
Miles Lucas
- Shortland Street character
- Portrayed by: Hamish MacFarlane
- Duration: 1992
- First appearance: 13 October 1992
- Last appearance: 29 October 1992
- Introduced by: Caterina De Nave
In-universe information
- Mother: Beverly Lucas
- Sisters: Caroline Lucas

Miles Lucas was the school friend of Nick Harrison (Karl Burnett) and Stuart Neilson (Martin Henderson). Nick became friends with Miles and introduced him to Stuart who got on better with him due to their similar articulate interests. However shortly after Stuarts 16th birthday party, Miles intentionally overdosed on pills, killing himself. Both boys were shocked and the death ended the boys friendship. On Halloween of that year, Alison Raynor (Danielle Cormack) believed the clinic was haunted by Miles' ghost. On Halloween 1993, Stuart, Nick and Rachel (Angela Bloomfield) used a ouija board and believed that they contacted Miles.

== Guy Warner ==
Guy Warner was the social worker brother of Chris Warner (Michael Galvin). Craig Parker played him in a guest stint in 1992 before returning as a regular from 1993 to 1996. He appeared again in 2007.

== Jane Fitzgerald ==
Jane Fitzgerald
- Shortland Street character
- Portrayed by: Katherine McRae
- Duration: 1992–93
- First appearance: November 1992
- Last appearance: March 1993
- Introduced by: Caterina De Nave
In-universe information
- Occupation: Lawyer
- Mother: Marj Brasch
- Half-brothers: Patrick Neilson; Darryl Neilson; Damien Neilson; Stuart Neilson

Jane Fitzgerald was the illegitimate daughter of Marj Neilson (Elizabeth McRae). Portrayed by Katherine McRae, the character was adopted out at birth and made contact with Marj in late 1992. She got on well with her mother but not so well with her step father - Tom (Adrian Keeling), who ended up running away. Jane eventually left for a job in Wellington. Several months later she moved to Australia.

== Melanie Kirk ==
Melanie Kirk
- Shortland Street character
- Portrayed by: Tina Regtien (1992-1993); Julie Crean (2006)
- Duration: 1992–93, 2006
- First appearance: 19 November 1992; Episode 129
- Last appearance: 15 September 2006; Episode 3552
- Introduced by: Brian Lenanne (1992); Jason Daniel (2006)
In-universe information
- Occupation: Doctor
- Mother: Mary Kirk
- Husband: Chris Warner (1990-1991); Unnamed husband
- Sons: Ben Kirk

Melanie Kirk was the ex-wife of Chris Warner (Michael Galvin). She arrived in late 1992 and tried to warn Chris' fiancé - Alison (Danielle Cormack) off him. Chris eventually dumped Alison and reconciled with Melanie however the reconciliation was short lived and Melanie left Chris for further job opportunities. She returned 13 years later and Chris' new wife - Toni (Laura Hill), suspected Melanie of trying to get Chris back. However Melanie revealed she had Fibromuscular Dysplasia and manipulated Chris into performing the risky operation.

== Serena Hughes ==
Serena Hughes
- Shortland Street character
- Portrayed by: Willa O'Neill
- Duration: 1992–93
- First appearance: 30 November 1992; Episode 136
- Last appearance: 12 January 1993; Episode 197
- Introduced by: Brian Lenanne

Serena Hughes was Nick's (Karl Burnett) first girlfriend. Nick used the gothic Serena to get on his mother's bad side but much to his shock the two got on well and Nick eventually fell in love, losing his virginity to her. However, when Serena started spending time with Stuart, Nick jumped to the conclusion that Serena was two-timing him with Stuart and grew jealous. The two split up and Serena left town for good.

== Henry Tamariki ==
Henry Tamariki
- Shortland Street character
- Portrayed by: Tamati Rice
- Duration: 1992–94
- First appearance: 17 August 1992
- Last appearance: 28 February 1994
- Introduced by: Brian Lenanne (1992); Tony Holden (1994)
In-universe information
- Occupation: Black Caps cricketer Cleaner

Henry Tamariki was introduced as a love interest for Jaki Manu (Nancy Brunning). Henry entered the hospital with an injury from playing cricket in late 1992 and soon started to date the smitten Jaki whilst managing the cleaning contract at the clinic. However, when Henry brought an illness in from another country, Jaki had little time for Henry and he strayed from the relationship and it ended. Henry returned the following year, seriously injured from bowling. A still hurt Jaki discouraged Henry from continuing cricket but when she refused to admit her true feelings for him, Henry continued. However, the two eventually confessed their love and Henry retired. The two moved to England.
