= Bruce Warner (Shortland Street) =

- Shortland Street character
- Portrayed by: Ken Blackburn
- Duration: 1992–1995
- First appearance: 12 June 1992
- Last appearance: 16 December 1995
- Introduced by: Caterina De Nave (1992); Brian Lenanne (1993); Tony Holden (1994); Gavin Strawhan (1995)
In-universe information
- Occupation: Doctor; Surgeon
- Family: the Warner's
- Wife: Lady Margot Warner (until 1995)
- Sons: Chris Warner; Guy Warner
- Daughters: Amanda Warner
- Grandsons: Frank Warner; Finn Warner; Phoenix Warner; Harry Warner; James Warner
- Granddaughters: Sass Warner; Tuesday Warner; Kelly Piper (possibly); Trinity Kwan
- Nephews: Isaac Worthington

Sir Bruce Warner is a fictional character on the New Zealand soap opera Shortland Street. He was portrayed by Ken Blackburn and was introduced as Chris Warner's (Michael Galvin) womanising father.

The character of Bruce was written with antagonistic characteristics, with his storylines often focusing on his rivalry with CEO Michael McKenna (Paul Gittins) and his attempts at taking over the hospital. He would often go behind his family's backs and either try to buy out the hospital or indulge in numerous affairs. Bruce's wish was finally granted in 1995 when Michael retired; however, only after signing the ownership deal of the hospital did Bruce realise Michael had the last laugh as Bruce was barred from holding any managerial positions, only being a silent partner.

Bruce's arrogant persona alongside his constant womanising, had a severe effect on both of his sons with Chris becoming the mirror image of his father and Guy (Craig Parker) blaming Bruce for his drug addiction.

== Creation and casting ==
Ken Blackburn was cast in the sporadic role of Bruce. Blackburn struggled with the writers consistently throughout his stints for what he saw an unnecessary antagonism in the character of Bruce. He found Bruce unrealistically "abrasive" and hugely impolite. The character was eventually killed off following a stint of several episodes in 1995.

== Storylines ==
A fierce rival of clinic CEO Michael (Paul Gittins) since they created Shortland Street, Sir Bruce used the appointment his son Chris (Michael Galvin) as a staff member in an attempt to discredit Michael's leadership. At conflict with Chris over his dismissal of the Warner family dynasty, their relationship was often strained. Sitting on the clinic board, Bruce bought out shareholdings to try take over the business to no success. Shortly after he invested significant money into a new private ward and carried out a union vote to force himself in as Chief Executive Officer of the clinic. Even with the help of Hone Ropata (Temuera Morrison), Bruce fell short and remained a share holder. The rivalry between Bruce and Michael continued following the poaching of Grace Kwan (Lynette Forday) from his hospital. Bruce soon admitted to being in love with her, straining his marriage to Margot (Glynis McNicoll) even further. The following year Bruce learned he was going to be a grandfather when his son Guy's (Craig Parker) girlfriend Carmen (Theresa Healey) fell pregnant. However Bruce was diagnosed with terminal cancer and dropped the bombshell that Guy was the product of an affair shortly before he died. Nick Harrison (Karl Burnett) who was with him at his death, claimed Bruce had retracted his will.

Later in 2003 Margot returned to town and claimed that Toni Thompson's (Laura Hill) brother Dominic (Shane Cortese) was the product of an affair Bruce had, thus making him Chris' brother. However this soon turned out to be false, causing Dom to derail and end up trying to murder Chris. In 2012 Marj Brasch (Elizabeth McRae) praised Bruce for his determination to set up the clinic alongside Michael.

== Reception ==
Blackburn found portraying the character saw a negative response from the public due to his antagonistic manner, something he did not mind as it was expected. Blackburn was the first victim of public abuse for Shortland Street, being accosted at a supermarket for his portrayal of Bruce. Michael Galvin (Chris Warner) found filming Bruce's final storyline that saw his health deteriorate, difficult, as his own father was going through a similar experience. He later recounted this as one of his worst moments on the soap.
