= Episode 1 (Shortland Street) =

- Shortland Street episode
- Carrie Burton delivers the infamous line to Hone Ropata: "you're not in Guatemala now, Dr. Ropata"
- Episode no.: Series 1 Episode 1
- Written by: Wendy Jackson
- Original air date: 25 May 1992

Guest appearances
- Anne Cathie as Lisa Stanton; Krista Nobilo as Tara Milburn; Suzy Aitken as Jill Johnstone

Episode chronology
← Previous —	Next → "Episode 2"

Episode 1 of the New Zealand soap opera Shortland Street was first broadcast on 25 May 1992.

== Storyline ==
The episode starts with paramedics Tom Neilson and Sam Aleni driving down a road with their siren on. Tom's wife Marjorie Neilson answers the phone and hears of a car crash involving a young couple by a construction site. Tom and Sam arrive at the scene to find a teenager in labour having received head injuries. Tom is surprised to find his teenage son Stuart at the scene. Against protocol, Tom and Sam decide to take the woman to Shortland Street Clinic as a result of her brain injury.

Meanwhile, the new doctor Hone Ropata arrives at the clinic. Director of nursing Carrie Burton welcomes him and begins to give him a tour of the building. Nurse Alison Raynor attends to a young aggressive teenage hoodlum who refuses help.

The paramedics arrive at the clinic and ask for a doctor. Carrie asks receptionist Kirsty Knight to call for Dr. Chris Warner. Meanwhile, Chris is seducing his aerobics instructor who has turned his pager off. Hone decides he has to deliver the baby and goes against protocol to do so. Carrie advises him not to and reminds him (in a memorable line) that "you're not in Guatemala now, Dr. Ropata", which Hone ignores. Stuart is denied entrance to the room the girl is giving birth as he is not family, to which he proclaims he is the baby's father. Tom and Marj are shocked that their highly religious son has had sex before marriage.

The teenage hoodlum Alison is seeing, Tara, apologises for her behaviour and Alison tells her it helps to be polite, while her back is turned, the girl goes into Alison's handbag and steals a wad of cash.

Kirsty finds Chris and tells him that he is needed. Carrie informs CEO Michael McKenna of Hone's unorthodox procedure to which Michael insists something will be done. Alison talks to Sam about her flat she is moving into but is shocked when she finds her money gone.

Hone checks out his exam room and is surprised to meet nurse Steve Mills who badmouths Chris Warner to Hone, leaving him with a bad impression. Steve is later shown to have a crush on Alison.

Chris arrives back to the hospital and meets Hone. The two are stopped by Michael McKenna who questions Hone's methods and why Chris was gone the whole day.

== Cast ==
The episode ends with a still of Chris Warner who would later go on to become the longest serving character on the soap.

- Paul Gittins as Dr. Michael McKenna
- Elizabeth McRae as Marjorie Neilson
- Adrian Keeling as Paramedic Tom Neilson
- Rene Naufahu as Sam Aleni
- Martin Henderson as Stuart Neilson
- Lisa Crittenden as Nurse Carrie Burton
- Danielle Cormack as Nurse Alison Raynor
- Temuera Morrison as Dr. Hone Ropata
- Angela Dotchin as Kirsty Knight
- Michael Galvin as Dr. Chris Warner
- Andrew Binns as Nurse Steve Mills
- Anna Cathie as Lisa Stanton, the pregnant teenage girl
- Krista Nobilo as Tara Milburn, the teenage hoodlum
- Suzy Aiken as Jill Johnstone, the aerobics instructor

== Production ==
The word placenta was not allowed in the first episode of the show as it was considered to be too risque for a 7pm timeslot. Given that a major storyline of the first episode revolved around a woman giving birth, this was a tricky word to avoid. The line "you're not in Guatemala now, Dr. Ropata" was also originally cut from the first script because it was deemed "too silly", but then it was put back in at the last minute - and is now an iconic piece of New Zealand television history. The line was originally written as, "You're not in Central America now" but a script editor decided that "Guatemala" sounded better.

Before the show was launched, it was called The Shortland Street Project because the plan was to shoot the show in a studio TVNZ owned on Shortland St in central Auckland. However, after working out an initial floor plan, the production crew realised that the space in Shortland St was going to be far too small to accommodate the sets that they required and they moved to a warehouse space in Browns Bay. After running through several name options, including A&E, the network executives agreed that the original idea was the one to go for and Shortland Street was born.

== Reception ==
The episode was met with mixed reviews with reviewers stating "New soap has dead-end feel to it" and "Soap gets thumbs down". Many also predicted the soap would not last long before cancellation. The Sunday news stated the soap was full of; "Over-acting, under-acting, cliched characters, corny scripts, sluggish editing, dated camera shots and tediously drawn-out scenes." However other reviews stated much to the contrary with headlines such as; "Just what the doctor ordered", "Fine pedigree behind new medical soap", and "Quick pace sets new soap apart".

=== Popular culture significance ===
The original cheesiness of the episode and several ideas have become historically significant in New Zealand pop culture history. The phrase "You're not in Guatemala now Dr. Ropata" instantly became Kiwiana and came 31 in the top 100 popular culture stories on Rocked The Nation 2.

Chris's raunchy sex scene with his aerobics instructor also became instantly famous as the show aired at such an early timeslot it was subjected to family viewing.
