= Guy Warner =

Fictional character

- Shortland Street character
- Portrayed by: Craig Parker
- Duration: 1992–1996, 2007–2008, 2020, 2023–2024, 2026
- First appearance: 27 October 1992
- Introduced by: Caterina De Nave (1992); Brian Lenanne (1993); Jason Daniel (2007); Oliver Driver (2020, 2023, 2024, 2026)
In-universe information
- Occupation: Social Worker at Shortland Street clinic (1993–96); Self help guru Author
- Father: Sir Bruce Warner
- Adoptive mother: Margot, Lady Warner
- Half-brothers: Chris Warner
- Half-sisters: Amanda Warner
- Daughters: Tuesday Warner
- Nephews: Frank Warner; Finn Warner; Phoenix Warner; Harry Warner; James Warner
- Nieces: Sass Warner; Trinity Kwan

Guy Warner is a fictional character on the New Zealand soap opera Shortland Street who was portrayed by Craig Parker in a guest role in 1992 before returning as core cast from 1993 to 1996. Guy returned for the shows 15th anniversary in May 2007 and again from December 2007 to April 2008. He would make further cameos in 2020, 2023, 2024 and 2026.

== Creation and casting ==
Craig Parker was cast as the role of Guy - Chris Warner's (Michael Galvin) brother, in 1992, a role he maintained for 4 years, before quitting and filming his final scenes in March 1996. Both Warner brothers made their last appearance in an episode written by Steven Zanoski that aired in May that year. Originally this was going to be the start of the series ultimate ending, however the show continued to renew and ended up ongoing. The character of Guy was not killed off so that producers could allow him to return. In May 2007 it was announced that Guy would be returning as part of the shows 15th anniversary. Parker revealed that he originally turned down the role, but after learning of his storylines and the development of the Tuesday character, he agreed to return in a more antagonistic role, he stated; "Working with Michael [Galvin] again and Laura [Hill] (Toni Warner), who I haven't worked with before, I knew it would be great fun." Guy reappeared for a scene via Zoom video calling in the show's final episode of 2020. Parker filmed his scenes through a video call from his Los Angeles home. Parker reprised his role via video call again in 2023, and in-person for the 2024 Christmas cliffhanger, saying that he was "always happy" to return "because it's Shortland Street. It's part of our collective history."

Parker returned to the role of Guy during the 2026 cliffhanger episodes, with the storyline focusing on Chris' marriage to the sister of established character Hone Ropata's (Temuera Morrison) sister, Miriama (Maria Walker) in what Galvin described as a "stroke of writing genius" in joining the two legacy families together. Galvin believed his history with Parker helped influence the acting of brothers on-set, "we can use that knowledge of each other and our friendship to kind of just have fun when we’re acting. So it was brilliant having him back. He’s very funny, and everybody – the whole crew and the cast – they love working with him, because he’s a very lovely person and lots of fun to be around."

== Storylines ==
Guy arrived in town in late 1992 and had a one-night stand with Meredith (Stephanie Wilkin) much to the entertainment of older brother, Chris (Michael Galvin) who had long courted her. Guy flirted with Chris' girlfriend Alison (Danielle Cormack), leading to their breakup. Finishing up his Social Work qualifications, Guy initially worked for the clinic in an Anger Management Course before securing full-time employment upon finishing his degree. Early in the new year, Guy ended up pursuing a more serious romance with Meredith and the two appeared to share a loving relationship, raising Meredith's young son. However the clinic staff were shocked when it was revealed Guy had a mistress, older women Jenny (Maggie Harper). Meredith ended the relationship and Guy briefly dated HIV patient Deborah (Lisa Chappell) but realised he had fallen in love with his good friend Carmen (Theresa Healey). The two began to date and Guy decided to get a vasectomy to prevent starting a family due both having bad experiences growing up. When Carmen fell pregnant, Guy assumed she had been cheating and left her. However it soon turned out the vasectomy had been unsuccessful and Guy was the true father. The two reconciled and committed to raising their baby daughter Tuesday (Kelly Tate) as a loving family. In 1995 he was shocked to learn he was the result of an affair between father, Bruce (Ken Blackburn) and Chris' nanny. Guy was devastated on Christmas day 1995 when Carmen was killed following being struck by a truck that collided through the clinic's reception. Depressed, Guy leaned on Chris to help raise his daughter and the Warners moved to the United States when a tumour was found on Tuesday's brain that could not be operated in New Zealand.

Guy returned in May 2007 with a teenage Tuesday (Olivia Tennet) and Chris soon discovered Guy had become addicted to drugs whilst embarking on a career as a self-help author. Infuriated by his brother's interference, Guy fled Ferndale with Chris' wife Toni (Laura Hill), their son Harry (Henry Williams) and Tuesday. Chris located them 6 months later and whilst trying to escape him, Guy drove the family off a road-side bank and ended up in a life threatening coma. When he awoke he continued his newfound relationship with Toni and resorted to rehab to kick his addiction. He realised Toni was still in love with Chris and had a one-night stand with Alice Piper (Toni Potter) before publishing a book that blamed Chris and the Warners for his drug addiction and subsequent chaotic lifestyle. Chris was devastated but the two brothers eventually reconciled before Guy returned to America in April 2008. Alice discovered she was pregnant shortly after with Guy being one of the potential fathers however her daughter died shortly after birth. Guy phoned in June 2008, saddened he could not make it to Toni's funeral who had succumbed to norovirus. In 2014 Chris stated that Guy would not be able to make it to his wedding. Guy and Chris reconnected in December 2020 via video-call, in which Guy used his experience of grief following Carmen's sudden-death, to help with the loss of Chris' son Phoenix (Geordie Holibar). Realising Chris' suicidal nature, he sought help from nephew Frank (Luke Patrick). In early 2023, Chris video-called Guy to agree the release of funds to re-open the fire-damaged hospital.

Guy returned to Ferndale in December 2024, having located a fugitive Harry Warner (Xander Manktelow), assisting nephews Frank (Luke Patrick) and Finn (Lukas Whiting) to deliver him to Chris. Eventually agreeing that Harry should turn himself into Police for 2 murders, Guy resisted Chris' request to disestablish their family trust-fund. Working alongside the rest of the family, Guy used Chris' fragile mental state to remove him from the trust and take ownership over the funds.

== Character development ==
=== Relationship with Carmen Roberts ===
Guy and Carmen Roberts began a close friendship in 1993 and their mutual friend Steve Mills tried to match make the two. However, after Steve's devastating death in 1994, the two finally got together at the staff party. Carmen's actress - Theresa Healey described why Carmen fell for Guy, saying; "I think she was trying to turn herself around. She saw the Warner family as a way out. As a way to become a little bit more acceptable and maybe she'd be happier. And she liked him. She actually liked him." The two ran into trouble when Guy admitted to an affair but both actors confessed the two would always return to each other with Healey stating; "His kooky sense of humour, his inappropriateness – like he's always doing the wrong thing and she always berates him for it. She loves him ... For all their fighting, they are addicted to each other and they love each other very much. But there is the baseline of no matter how horrible they are to each other, they know they'll always be able to say sorry ay some stage – well, Guy will say sorry!" Guy had a vasectomy but Carmen was shocked to learn she was pregnant, indicating an affair. However it soon turned out the vasectomy hadn't worked but Carmen was still hesitant to have the child. Carmen soon came round to the idea when she thought she had lost the baby during the pregnancy and the two got into bitter arguments as to what to name the baby. She was eventually named Tuesday. Guy was devastated when Carmen died in December 1995 and departed to America with Tuesday and Chris. Upon his return in 2007, it was clear Guy was not over Carmen, Parker stated: "Guy has never got over Carmen and was always searching for another Carmen. He's had a string of bad relationships and picked up some bad habits along the way."

== Reception ==
Throughout his original stint, Guy was one of the most popular characters on the show. The character was described by a journalist as being "terminally nice". Producer Jason Daniel listed the return of Guy as one of his favourite storylines throughout his run on the soap. In the 2008 Throng Shortland Street Fan Awards, Guy was listed as one of the characters fans would most like to return. Charlotte Cowan of Entertainment Fix praised Guy's return storyline and compared it favorably to the returns of Hone Ropata (Temuera Morrison) in 2008 and Justine Jones (Lucy Wigmore) in 2009. It was later named as the 4th best ever character return storyline in the soap by the Shortland Street website in 2013. Laura Hill (Toni Warner) enjoyed working alongside Parker and Olivia Tennet (Tuesday Warner) during 2007, noting the "lovely new energy" they brought to the Warner family unit. In 2012, the character was named as one of the standout characters of the show's first 20 years.
