= Sam Aleni =

- Shortland Street character
- Portrayed by: Rene Naufahu
- Duration: 1992–1996, 2014
- First appearance: 25 May 1992
- Last appearance: 8 October 2014
- Introduced by: Caterina De Nave (1992); Simon Bennett (2014)
- Book appearances: Kirsty and Lionel – Shortland Street Books (1996)
In-universe information
- Occupation: Paramedic bar manager disc jockey prostitute
- Mother: Ana Aleni
- Brothers: Nat Aleni
- Wife: Talita Palele (1993–1994); Alise Aleni (1998–2009)
- Daughters: Honour Aleni
- Uncles: Vai Tali
- First cousins: Eddie Tali

Sam Aleni is a fictional character on the New Zealand soap opera Shortland Street who was portrayed by Rene Naufahu as part of the original cast from 1992 to 1996. Naufahu reprised his role 18 years later from March 2014.

== Creation and casting ==
After watching Australian soap operas, Neighbours and Home and Away, Caterina De Nave noticed a lack of ethnic diversity in the cast and as such, one of her goals whilst creating Shortland Street was to push new ground and create an ethically diverse cast. At the time of the shows creation there was only one Pacific Islander paramedic in New Zealand and as a result producers wrote the role of Sam as a paramedic to help enforce the role of Pacific Islanders in the community. Rene Naufahu auditioned for the role and was cast, but upon the initial phone call informing him of his success, he hung up, believing it to be a prank call. Naufahu was surprised he won the role due to his inexperience and how he believed he knew, "nothing about acting ... I thought all my acting was about eyebrows." He found it strange acting in a workplace with very little fellow Polynesians and noted a scene where Sam attended a party by himself as odd, stating, "what island guy does that?" Naufahu thought the fame associated with appearing on the soap was overbearing and in 1996, quit after 4 years. He requested that Sam be killed off; however, this did not happen. Sam made his final appearance as a regular on 6 August 1996.

Naufahu was offered to reprise the role multiple times following his departure, but he never felt it was the right time. Producers planned a storyline in 2014 that would see Sam return as a love interest for Vasa Levi (Teuila Blakely). When asked to reprise the role Naufahu accepted after learning what pleasure it would bring his mother. He was cast in late 2013. It was announced in January that Naufahu would return to the soap. Naufahu was pleased to be working alongside Blakely but was unaware the two would share a romantic storyline. Naufahu had previously acted with Blakely on the soap, when she portrayed an extra at his onscreen wife's funeral in 1994. He found it odd acting alongside a young cast, having been part of the young characters when he first appeared, "I've become that grumpy guy on set. When I started out I was like, 'that guy is so grumpy because he forgot his lines. Get it together old man.' Now its like, that's me." He found it particularly strange acting alongside Lucy Elliott (Dayna Jenkins), having held her as a baby when her father, Peter appeared on the soap. Naufahu found it easy getting back into character but noted Sam was, "much cooler than me." He also noted that Sam's return would not be sensational, rather he would simply become "wallpaper". Sam made his return on 18 March 2014. Naufahu hoped the role would be long-running and believed he could see himself on the soap for another 10 years. The character was written off following Blakely's decision to leave the show, and Vasa and Sam both departed on 11 July 2014. However Naufahu agreed to reprise his role 3 months later, to reintroduce his onscreen daughter Sophie McIntosh (Honour Aleni) into the core cast. Sam made a one-episode return on 8 October 2014.

== Storylines ==
Sam was part of the original cast and was at first characterised as a nice and popular ambulance driver.

Paramedic Sam flatted with Steve Mills (Andrew Binns) and Alison Raynor (Danielle Cormack) and it was clear to all the staff that he was heavily religious and planned to stay celibate until marriage. However a relationship with a drug addict saw him defy his faith and she ended up stealing from the flat. When she returned, the two reconciled and got engaged but it was short lived. Sam stood by his brother Nat (Joe Naufahu) when he got involved in racial gang wars that saw his best friend get murdered. Sam grew close to Tongan rival, Talita "T.P." Palele (Elizabeth Skeen) but the two families opposed the relationship and with Jamie's (Karl Urban) help, Sam ended up marrying T.P. to keep them together. However tragedy struck when T.P. was killed in a devastating car crash. Sam strived to stop the Palele's involvement in their daughter's funeral, but gave in and became friends with the family. Sam grew close to Kennedy's owner, Alex McKenna (Liddy Holloway) and became a part-time manager of the bar and later manager of a band. He fell in love with the lead singer but felt uneasy with T.P.'s death being so recent.

Sam eventually dedicated most of his time to being a DJ but a run-in with a dodgy bar manager saw Sam beaten and hospitalised. Sam left for a conference in London and returned a confused man. He kidnapped a lover's baby but quickly returned her before again leaving for London. Upon his eventual return, Sam had become a cruel and bitter man. Sam gave up on religion and it soon turned out he had become a male prostitute whilst overseas. He dated Ana Fa'asolo (Mary Lose) and later fell in love with villainous Carla Crozier (Elisabeth Easther). However Sam began to doubt the mentality of his lover and dumped her when he feared she murdered husband Bernie Leach (Timothy Bartlett) only to briefly be framed for his murder. He realised how sour he had grown after the death of his wife. Re-embracing his faith and befriending a young tearaway named Jonah Lafa'ele, Sam paid one final visit to TP's grave, then departed for Samoa late in the year.

Sam returned as the supervisor of Ula Levi's (Frankie Adams) paramedic course. He quickly fell offside with Ula but it soon became apparent he was still scarred from TP's death as well as the recent death of his second wife Alise, whom he had fathered a daughter Honour (Sophie McIntosh) with. Sam got a job at the hospital as a paramedic and briefly dated Emma Franklin (Amy Usherwood) before he fell in love with Vasa Levi (Teuila Blakely). Following the attack and later abduction of Honour, Sam and Vasa decided to leave Ferndale and live together as a family on the reclusive island, Akatea. Sam later visited Ferndale to attend a gig Honour was playing at, and allowed her to move away from the island and live with Ula.

== Character development ==
=== 1994 car crash ===
"God knows I had some hairy moments learning how to act on set, (Shortland Street was my first proper gig) but I look back on those episodes and I think that was where I came of age as an actor. And I'm grateful to the guys around me at that time for that."

— Naufahu reflecting on the car crash storyline.

In 1994, producers planned a major storyline that would revolve around a car crash; the biggest stunt to happen in the soaps first few years. The storyline was planned as an exit storyline for departing actors, Andrew Binns (Nurse Steve Mills) and Elizabeth Skeen (Sam's wife, TP). Naufahu was sceptical when he first heard TP was being killed off and recalled thinking, "her exit is gonna be pretty lame, she might choke on a KFC drumstick or something." The car crash was written to involve several characters, including Sam, Steve, TP, Chris Warner (Michael Galvin) and Kirsty Knight (Angela Dotchin), but it was not revealed to the public who would die. Whilst filming the stunt, paparazzi from a national newspaper arrived on location to try and capture which character would die, leading to weeks of speculation in the New Zealand entertainment media. Television New Zealand set about launching a disinformation campaign, with all the actors involved being interviewed for publications as though they were leaving the show. The storyline saw Chris, TP, Steve, and Kirsty travelling in a car back from Leonard (Marton Csokas) and Gina's (Josephine Davison) leaving party, only for Chris and Steve to get in a heated argument that saw the car roll off a bank. Sam arrived on scene, only to witness the car dramatically explode with TP and Steve still inside. The explosion was the final segment filmed in the scene, but Galvin noted the "Simple pleasures" they had in staying on location to witness the stunt. Naufahu found TP's death upsetting and admitted, "fogging up" whilst reading the final draft of the script, "TP was just so innocent and beautiful – the writers did amazingly. So then came the challenge of doing justice to the script." Naufahu believed the death of TP saw a huge change in Sam, "When TP passed away in a car crash I sort of realized I've actually got to really work and put something into it. That was a little bit of a turning point. It was a huge storyline." The death of TP weighed heavily on Sam for the rest of his first stint, his characterisation saw him become a "bitter" and "angry" man and eventually saw him depart in 1996 after realising he had not coped properly with TP's death. In 2014, twenty years to the day of TP's death, scenes aired that saw Sam emotionally break down to Ula Levi (Frankie Adams) and admit how TP's death had impacted his life.

== Reception ==
Throughout his appearances in the nineties, Sam was described as a "hunk" and was referred to by broadcaster Robbie Rakete as a "great character". Naufahu did not realise until he returned for his second stint, the importance it was to have a portrayal of a Pacific Islander in the soaps original cast. Sam's romance with TP (Elizabeth Skeen) alongside her death, were named as one of the most memorable story lines ever featured on the soap. Her death was also voted as the shows 4th most memorable storyline by fans. The 1993 storyline that saw Sam struggle to cope with co worker Jamie Forrest's (Karl Urban) sexuality and relationship with Jonathon McKenna (Kieren Hutchison) was considered groundbreaking for New Zealand television. It was deemed so controversial that the couple's first kiss was edited before lips actually touched to only show Sam's shocked expression. Upon Sam's return in 2014, radio program, The Two Robbies Breakfast Show suggested that bringing him back alongside the earlier return of Grace Kwan (Lynette Forday) was a possible attempt at drawing in an older audience familiar with them through watching in the nineties. Naufahu's screen daughter Sophie McIntosh (Honour Aleni) enjoyed working alongside him and noted that he had taught her a lot with his vast experience.
