= Hone Ropata =

Fictional character on the New Zealand soap opera Shortland Street

- Shortland Street character
- Portrayed by: Temuera Morrison
- Duration: 1992–95, 2008, 2026
- First appearance: 25 May 1992
- Last appearance: 17 November 2026
- Created by: Ken Catran
- Introduced by: Caterina De Nave (1992); Jason Daniel (2008); Oliver Driver (2026)
In-universe information
- Occupation: Chief Executive Officer of Shortland Street Hospital (2008); Clinic owner (1995–2008); Consultant at Shortland Street A&E clinic (1992–94, 1994–95)
- Father: George Ropata
- Mother: Kitty Ropata
- Sisters: Aorewa Atutahi; Miriama Ropata
- Nephews: Manny Atutahi
- Nieces: Izzy Dove

Dr. Hone Ropata is a fictional character on the New Zealand soap opera Shortland Street who was portrayed by Temuera Morrison as part of the original cast. Morrison maintained the role for three years before briefly reprising it in 2008 to commemorate the show's 4000th episode.

== Creation and casting ==
Caterina De Nave developed the idea of what was to become Shortland Street after watching successful Australian soap operas Home and Away and Neighbours and noted the lack of diversity concerning race in the cast. De Nave alongside a team of writers and story liners, decided to include several ethnic minorities, with Ken Catran pitching the idea of Hone – a determined Māori doctor. Alongside Hone, was Jaki Manu – a Māori nurse, and Sam Aleni – a Polynesian paramedic. He was written as part of the Ngāti Porou iwi. Temuera Morrison had several minor roles in television but successfully landed the role and Hone made his debut on the show's first episode. Following acting in the film Once Were Warriors in 1994, Morrison struggled to leave the character of Jake Heke (an abusive and out of control drunk), and subsequently found that upon returning to Shortland Street he was "Dr Jake and I'd tell the patients, 'You'll be fucking sick by the time I've finished with you.'" In 1995 Morrison decided to leave the role after what he saw as "hands in pockets" acting. He made his last regular appearance on 5 May 1995.

At the show's 2007 Christmas celebrations, Morrison was approached by cast members Michael Galvin (Chris Warner), Craig Parker (Guy Warner) and producer Jason Daniel. The trio offered Morrison a return to the show citing the high ratings, which he accepted and later jokingly blamed on Daniel force-feeding him beer. Morrison agreed on the condition that the character could ride a Harley-Davidson motorbike and could date a "hot" woman. It was announced in March 2008 that Morrison would be reprising his role of Hone after 13 years to mark the show's 4000th episode. Morrison was signed to an initial 6 week contract, but Morrison was open to a potential extension or even a full-time role. Daniel was pleased with Morrison's return, "We've constructed a story that makes it interesting for Tem to come back and play so that it's not just more of the same. It's his character under pressure and with a series of challenges that make it an interesting journey for him as a character and an interesting challenge for Tem." Hone's return aired on 5 June 2008 on episode 3999. Morrison proved to be problematic on set; not remembering his lines, being uncomfortable filming emotional scenes, and not arriving on set when he had to film something he did not like. He departed following the conclusion of his six-week contract. Morrison was not asked to reprise the role for the shows 20th anniversary in 2012. In 2014 Rene Naufahu (Paramedic Sam Aleni) suggested bringing back Morrison so that the former co stars could "forget their lines" together.

Morrison reprised his role of Hone for the 2026 season finale, appearing in an unannounced cameo. Hone returned on-screen accompanying sister Miriama (Maria Walker) down the aisle to marry Chris Warner in what Galvin described as a "stroke of writing genius" in joining the two legacy families together.

== Storylines ==
Hone arrived to the clinic in May 1992 following a stint in Guatemala and instantly clashed with several of the staff due to his unorthodox methods. Hone's fiancé Claire Lloyd (Annie Stanford) soon arrived but the couple broke up when it turned out she had been sleeping with both Chris Warner (Michael Galvin) and Michael McKenna (Paul Gittins). Hone grew close to co-worker Meredith Fleming's (Stephanie Wilkin) son Andrew (Ezra Woods) and became a father figure to him, eventually drawing him into a relationship with Meredith. In 1993 Meredith dumped Hone after several months and he flatted with Jenny (Maggie Harper) and Nick Harrison (Karl Burnett) and later, Chris Warner. Following an appearance on a current affairs show, Hone began to be harassed by an unseen assailant. Hone soon discovered it was a fellow doctor, Te Aniwa Ryan (Moana Maniapoto-Jackson) who disagreed with his medical views. Nonetheless, the two overcame their issues and became a couple. In 1994 Hone cheated on Te Aniwa with Hillary (Susan Brady), ending his relationship for an affair that was short lived.

Several months into the year, Hone disappeared without a trace and upon his return, it was revealed he had illegally snuck a refugee into the country. Michael fired Hone but later welcomed him back to the clinic. Hone's nephew Manny (Albert Belz) arrived to stay with Hone but got into trouble with gangs. Whilst defending his nephew, Hone punched a gang member and was shocked when Chris declared the man dead. Hone was arrested on a murder charge but was cleared and began to date his lawyer Caitlin Devereux (Sarah Smuts-Kennedy), who left her husband for him. After the trial in 1995, Hone and Caitlin decided to set up a clinic on the East Coast and the couple departed Ferndale with the assistance of Chris and Carmen (Theresa Healey). 13 years later, Hone returned to the hospital to audit the hospital under the supervision of Martha Riley (Jacque Drew). Chris and TK Samuels (Benjamin Mitchell) soon came to realize that Hone was seriously mentally unstable following a series of murders and rapes in his clinic in Africa. Hone replaced Chris as the hospital's Chief Executive Officer but quickly tired of the job and began an affair with Tania Jeffries (Faye Smythe). However Hone soon came to realize his fragile mentality and broke it off with Tania and fled to Australia. In 2012 Chris told Henare Ngatai (George Henare) that the two had previously been introduced by Hone.

Hone returned in the 2026 Cliffhanger for Chris's wedding to his sister Miriama (Maria Walker).

== Reception ==
Upon the show's first airing, OnFilm Magazine critic Wendyl Nissen praised Morrison in his role as Hone, stating he was a natural. The character was immortalized in New Zealand television history after Carrie Burton's line to him ("you're not in Guatemala now, Dr Ropata") in the first episode gained pop culture significance. On Morrison's first day back of shooting in March 2008, the crew members wore T-shirts donning the phrase. The character was considered a "heart throb". Hone's return in 2008 received mixed reviews, Charlotte Cowan of Entertainment Fix criticized Hone's 2008 return and named it in a series of disappointing return storylines on the soap. Michelle Hewitson on the other hand was a lot more positive, calling it a "brilliant idea" and praising the reunion between Hone and Chris Warner (Michael Galvin). The Shortland Street website also listed Hone's return as the 3rd best ever character return in the soap's history in a 2013 collated list. In 2012, the character was named as one of the standout characters of the show's first 20 years. In 2017 Ricardo Simich expressed his desire for Hone to return for the soap opera's 25th anniversary saying it was a "must" as he was the recipient of the shows most famous line. The same year, stuff.co.nz journalist Fleur Mealing named Hone as the top character she most wanted to return for the show's 25th anniversary. The New Zealand Woman's Day magazine listed Hone as the 5th best character of the soap's first 25 years.

Hone's surprise return in 2026 was hailed as the "biggest surprise of all" by The Spinoff reviewer Tara Ward, noting, "The marriage of Chris Warner should have been the most dramatic moment of tonight’s Shortland Street 2026 cliffhanger ... But then a familiar face strolled into the church and quietly upstaged the local lovegod in his hour of glory. As Chris stood at the altar ... Hone walked back into our lives, and suddenly all was right with the world again."
