= Kirsty Knight =

Kirsty Knight may refer to:

- Kirsty Knight (The Bill), a fictional character on The Bill
- Kirsty Knight (Shortland Street), a fictional character on the soap opera Shortland Street
