= Epitaph (TV series) =

- Directed by: Paul Gittins
- Presented by: Paul Gittins
- Country of origin: New Zealand
- Original language: English

Original release
- Network: TV1

Epitaph was a New Zealand television show that aired on TV1 during evenings in 2001. The show was directed and presented by Paul Gittins. Two books were published based on the programme.

== Reception ==
The show was successful and well received by critics. A writer for The New Zealand Herald referred to Epitaph as a "genuine original local programme that isn't hung on some thin idea".
