= Stuart Neilson =

Fictional character on Shortland Street

- Shortland Street character
- Portrayed by: Martin Henderson
- Duration: 1992–95, 2017
- First appearance: 25 May 1992
- Last appearance: 25 May 2017
- Created by: Bettina Hollings
- Introduced by: Caterina De Nave (1992); Maxine Fleming (2017)
In-universe information
- Occupation: Doctor; Property investor (1994–95)
- Father: Tom Neilson
- Mother: Marj Brasch
- Brothers: Darryl Neilson; Patrick Neilson; Damien Neilson
- Half-sisters: Jane Fitzgerald
- Nephews: Robert Neilson
- Nieces: Melissa Neilson; Rebecca Stanton

Dr. Stuart Neilson is a fictional character in the New Zealand soap opera Shortland Street who was portrayed by Martin Henderson as part of the original cast until early 1995. The character returned after 22 years off screen to celebrate the show's 25th anniversary episode which aired on 25 May 2017.

The character's three years on the soap featured several major story lines as well as social commentary on youth, religion and mental illness. Stuart was introduced alongside mother, Marj (Elizabeth McRae) and father, Tom Neilson (Adrian Keeling) as a core family-unit alongside recurring brothers, Darryl (Mark Ferguson), Damien (Mark Ferguson) and Patrick.

The character was generally well received with Henderson winning the "Best Male Dramatic Performance in a Television Show" in the 1993 New Zealand Television and Film Awards.

== Creation and casting ==
With the intention of creating a diverse and ethnically representational cast for a New Zealand soap opera, Caterina De Nave, Bettina Hollings, and Jason Daniel decided to incorporate two teenage heartthrobs to draw in the teenage audience. The characters of Stuart and Nick were created with the intention of Nick being a drug-smoking rebel whilst Stuart was to be an articulate homosexual. The character was written as part of a family unit consisting of himself, his father Tom (Adrian Keeling), mother Marj, (Elizabeth McRae) and a recurring elder brother Darryl (Mark Ferguson). The middle-class family grouping enabled greater reflection of the show's core audience demographics.

Martin Henderson was in his final year of high school when he auditioned and won the role over 900 other contenders, including Oliver Driver, who ended up getting the role of Mike Galloway several years later. Henderson signed an initial 1-year contract and originally intended to depart following the singular year to pursue a corporate career outside acting. Stuart debuted in the first episode with the gay storyline set to be exposed over several months when a female character – Kirsty Knight (Angela Dotchin), became interested in Stuart. However, the character of Nick as portrayed by Karl Burnett proved to be vastly different from the character's original badboy synopsis and was hastily rewritten to suit Burnett's more comedic portrayal. This change left viewers with only one heartthrob on screen in Stuart, and nervous Television New Zealand producers requested that the character was rewritten to be straight so that the show remained appealing to the target audience of young teen women. On screen, Stuart was shown to be rebuffing Kirsty's advances and writers quickly rewrote the character's backstory so that rather than being gay, he was heavily religious and celibate. Two children were added to the Neilson family unit to emphasise the Catholic nature of the family. Following the completion of Henderson's first-year contract and the win of a New Zealand Television Award, he decided to pursue acting full-time and committed to the role.

By 1994, Henderson began to tire of the character's lack of diversity and challenge and felt that the character was becoming one-dimensional. He agreed to sign a final 1-year extension to his contract before he would leave to pursue a film career, committing to this decision when his acting ambition was dismissed by a producer on the soap. Henderson subsequently left the show at the end of his extended contract and departed New Zealand to further his acting career. His departure was leaked to the press, and there was speculation that Stuart would leave the show following the 1994 December cliffhanger. Some storylines that were suggested by media included the idea of Stuart winning Kirsty over Lionel and marrying before fleeing the country and also a series of episodes that would see Stuart become a priest and flee. None of the stories came to fruition, and the character made his last appearance on 27 February 1995, episode 707. Henderson later reflected on the "immense pressure" he had experienced in the role and believed he "listened to my inner voice and knew I needed to step away from it. I poured my heart and soul into that role. I did everything that was asked of me, all the press, all the media, until I gave too much of myself."

Producers discussed bringing back Henderson in 1998 as part of the write off of the Kirsty Knight character. However, he ended up not returning. Henderson was asked to reprise the role for the show's 15th anniversary in 2007 but declined due to a busy workload. However, he expressed interest in returning in the future as the idea "still appeals" to him. In 2014, Henderson dismissed a suggestion by a journalist to return to the soap but acknowledged the "exciting times" he had during his 3 years on screen. When planning for the show's 25th anniversary in 2017, producers decided to kill off the character of Marj. It was decided to approach Henderson to reprise his role for the episode. He agreed to return. However, issues arose with Henderson filming Grey's Anatomy in the United States, meaning scheduling proved difficult. Ultimately the whole episode was filmed, then Stuart's scenes were filmed at a different date and integrated in. Henderson described the experience as feeling like an "alien" as there had been "water under the bridge" since his last appearance.

== Storylines ==
In 1992 the sensitive teenage Stuart shocked his mother Marj (Elizabeth McRae) when he claimed his pregnant friend Lisa Stanton (Anne Cathie) was his lover and claimed to be the father of her child though it soon turned out the true father was Stuart's manipulative brother Darryl Neilson (Mark Ferguson) and Stuart was covering for him out of loyalty. Stuart grew close to his best friend Nick Harrison's (Karl Burnett) friend Miles (Hamish MacFarlane) but was devastated when Miles committed suicide following his 17th birthday party. The ordeal drew Stuart to Marj's co-worker hospital recepitonist Kirsty Knight (Angela Dotchin) and he struggled to balance his lust with his Catholic faith. Marj was devastated to later learn Stuart had succumbed to Kirsty's charm. Stuart and Kirsty continued an on-off relationship which saw Darryl attempt to rape her and a dramatic falling out between the brothers.

Scandal erupted in 1993 when a storyline saw the middle aged Alex McKenna (Liddy Holloway) seduce 17-year-old Stuart.

In 1993 Stuart's father Tom (Adrian Keeling) disappeared and a devastated Stuart renounced his Catholic faith and his plans to become a priest, discovering a passion for art. As an act of rebellion, he dropped out of the Catholic school and briefly had a fling with the middle aged Alex McKenna (Liddy Holloway) only to truly fall for her daughter Rachel (Angela Bloomfield). The two broke up following Rachel's discovery of Stuart and Alex's past relationship and Stuart started to date new nurse Joanna Jordan (Greer Robson). Stuart found a passion for corporate real estate and dropped out of university to pursue his new career. Despite dating Jo, Stuart fell in love with Rebecca Frost (Luisa Burgess) but the feelings were unrequited leaving him single.

As 1994 ended Stuart realised he was still in love with Kirsty and attempted to stop her marriage to Lionel Skeggins (John Leigh). Declining Stuart once and for all, Kirsty married Lionel and Stuart fled town. He returned after several weeks with a friend named Lulu (Meighan Desmond) who quickly won favour from Marj. Shortly thereafter Stuart again fled Ferndale without notice and Marj resultingly fostered Lulu as her daughter. Marj later reported Stuart had refused to attend Darryl's funeral as he had despised him. In mid 1995 Marj informed Jenny (Maggie Harper) that Stuart was in India.

22 years later, Stuart returned to Ferndale for Chris Warner's (Michael Galvin) 50th birthday but ended up having to look after Marj who had been hospitalised. Harper Whitley (Ria Vanderkis) was instantly attracted to Stuart and discovered through Marj that he had become a doctor and was recently divorced. Stuart helped in ED during the volcanic eruption and ultimately shared a kiss with Harper as he struggled to deal with Marj's illness. Upon finally reuniting with Chris, the two discovered that Marj had died in the hospital reception.

== Reception ==
Following the airing of the shows first episode, Henderson was praised by many reviewers; Jill Graham of The New Zealand Herald referred to him as, "becoming a stand-out actor in the Street", whilst Colleen Reilly from the Dominion Sunday Times suggested he was New Zealand's answer to Luke Perry from Beverly Hills, 90210. The character picked up a "heartthrob" status and remains well known to viewers of Shortland Street as the first teenager on the show. Henderson won the award for "Best Male Dramatic Performance in a Television Show" in the 1993 New Zealand Television and Film Awards. Stuart and Jo Jordan (Greer Robson) were labelled the, "Golden Couple" of Shortland Street. In 2012, the character was named as one of the standout characters of the show's first 20 years. The storyline that saw Stuart crash Lionel and Kirsty's wedding, has been voted by fans as one of the show's most iconic moments. In 2016, Stuart was named by a stuff.co.nz reporter as the 2nd character they most wanted to return to show. The following year Ricardo Simich expressed his desire for Stuart to return for the soap opera's 25th anniversary saying it would best represent the 25th cycle. In 2017 stuff.co.nz journalist Fleur Mealing named Stuart as the 10th character she most wanted to return for the show's 25th anniversary.

Stuart's romance with the middle aged Alex McKenna was viewed as scandalous, with Henderson replying to the outcry stating; "Age has nothing to do with it at all. It's about people, not numbers." The storyline that saw Stuart become involved in the property market was criticized by reviewers, with some claiming the writers were so intent on telling the story, they forgot the characters past personality and ignored his young age. Henderson himself criticized the character in his final year of the soap, calling his earlier storylines; "more believable" and labeling the character one dimensional. He wanted the character to have more "fun" and act more like a teenager. The period around Stuart's departure was a highly successful one for the show, receiving record high ratings which some speculated would not occur after the exit of the highly popular Stuart.
