= Mark Ferguson (actor) =

Australian actor

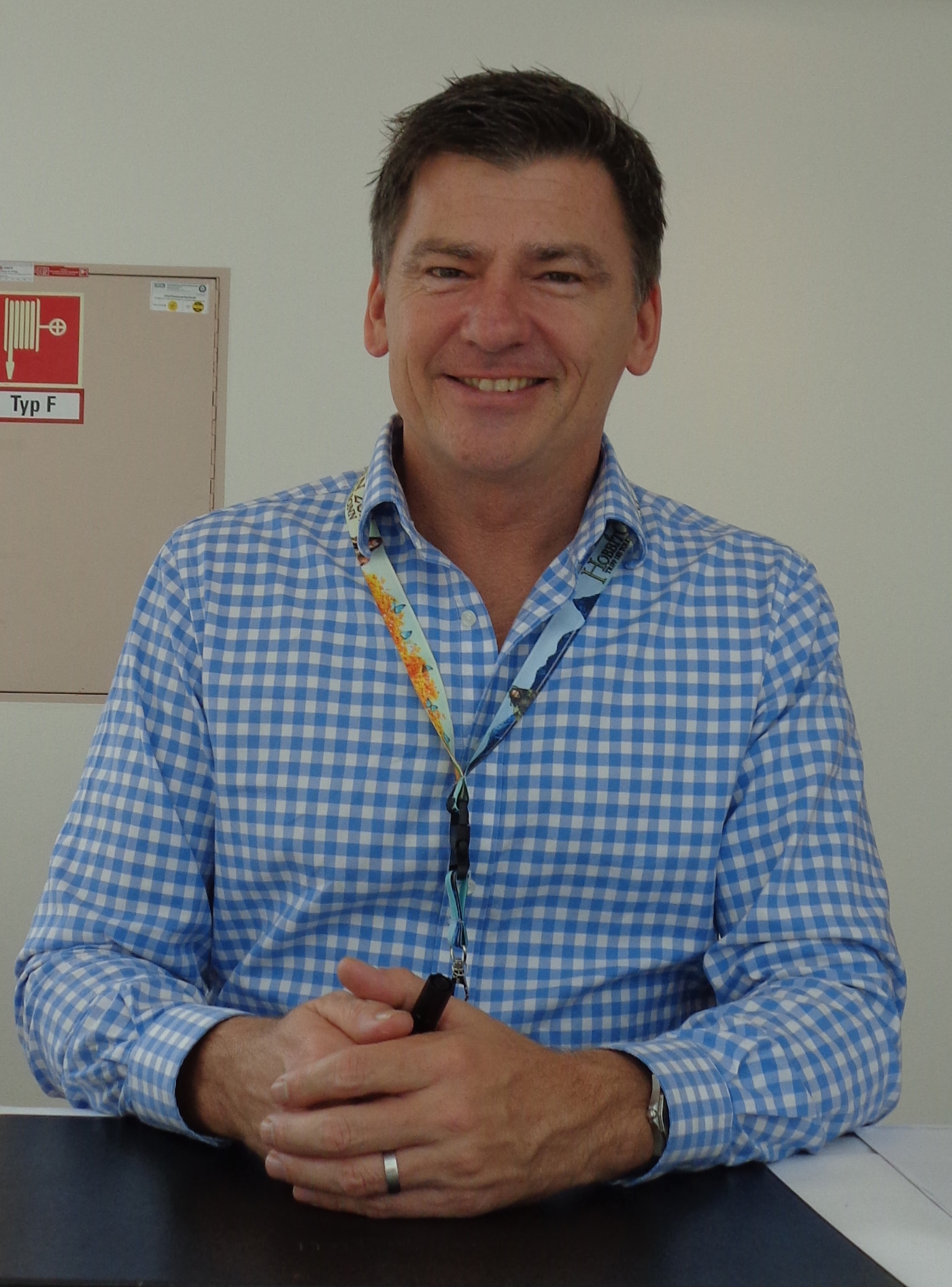
- Ferguson at the Hobbitcon III convention in Bonn, Germany on 6 April 2015
- Occupations: Actor, television presenter
- Years active: 1981–present

Mark Ferguson is a New Zealand–based Australian actor and television presenter.

== Biography ==
Born in Sydney, Australia, Ferguson attended the National Institute of Dramatic Art (NIDA) and graduated in 1981. In 1982, he played Paul Sheppard in the television series Sons and Daughters (Australian TV series), played alongside Michael York in the film The Far Country and starred in The Sinking of the Rainbow Warrior". Between 1992 and 1995, he portrayed twin brothers Darryl and Damian Neilson in the popular New Zealand soap opera "Shortland Street" and had a stint in the award-winning animation short film "When Ponds Freeze Over".

In 1994, he made his first appearance in Hercules – The Legendary Journeys, playing Prometheus in "Hercules and the Circle of Fire". He also had roles in the Xena television series.

Ferguson had a role in Peter Jackson's The Lord of the Rings: The Fellowship of the Ring, in which he portrayed Gil-galad, the last High King of the Noldor. Though most of his scenes were eventually cut from the movie, he can still be spotted at several shots during the film's prologue.

In 2001, Ferguson was the New Zealand host of Australian reality television series Big Brother Australia and The Mole, as well as several special episodes of Big Brother Australia 2001 and 2002. Also in 2001 Ferguson played Andrew Couch in the television series Spin Doctors.

In 2012, he appeared as Dominus in an episode of Spartacus: War of the Damned.

== Filmography ==
- Sons and Daughters (1982) (TV Series) – Paul Sheppard
- A Country Practice (1982) (TV Series) – Phil Shepherd
- The Far Country (1986) (TV) – Harry Peters
- Gloss (1987) (TV)
- The Rainbow Warrior (1992) – Det. Neil Morris
- The Further Adventures of Black Beauty – (1992) (TV Series) Masters
- Shortland Street (1992–1995) (TV series) – Darryl Neilson
- Marlin Bay (1992) (TV Series) – Gene Toomey
- Hercules in the Underworld (1994) – Hades
- Hercules: The Legendary Journeys Hercules and the Circle of Fire (1994) (TV) – Prometheus
- High Tide (1994) (TV series) – Robert E. Harper
- Hercules: The Legendary Journeys – As Darkness Falls (1994) (TV Episode) – Craesus the Centaur
- Xena: Warrior Princess – Hooves and Harlots (1995) (TV Episode) – Krykus
- Melody Rules (1995) (Sitcom) – Aaron
- Xena: Warrior Princess – Orphan of War (1996) (TV Episode) – Dagnine
- Xena: Warrior Princess – Remember Nothing (1996) (TV Episode) – Krykus
- Every Woman's Dream (1996) (TV movie) – Bank Officer
- Xena: Warrior Princess – The Xena Scrolls (1996) (TV Episode) – John Smythe
- Shortland Street (1998) (TV Series) – Damian Neilson
- Xena: Warrior Princess – Past Imperfect (1999) (TV Episode) – Dagnine
- Above the Law – Happy Families (2000) (TV Episode) – Andie
- Big Brother Australia (2001) – Himself
- The Mole (TV Series) (2001) – Himself
- Big Brother Australia 2002 (2001) – Himself
- Spin Doctors (2001–2003) (TV Series) – Andrew Couch
- The Lord of the Rings: The Fellowship of the Ring (2001) – Gil-galad
- Spooked (2004) – Bill Roberts
- Living the Dream (2004) (TV Series) – The Smarmy Host
- Power Rangers Mystic Force – (2006) (voice) – Gekkor
- Power Rangers Operation Overdrive – (2007) (voice) – Moltor
- Spartacus: Vengeance – (2012) – Dominus
