= Michael McKenna (Shortland Street) =

Fictional character from Shortland Street

- Shortland Street character
- Portrayed by: Paul Gittins
- Duration: 1992–1995, 1997–1999
- First appearance: 25 May 1992
- Last appearance: 21 January 1999
- Introduced by: Caterina De Nave (1992); Simon Bennett (1997, 1998)
In-universe information
- Occupation: Clinic Director of Shortland Street (1989–1995)
- Mother: May McKenna
- Sisters: Shirley McKenna
- Wife: Alex McKenna (until 1999)
- Sons: Jonathon McKenna
- Daughters: Rachel McKenna
- Nephews: Stratford Wilson
- Nieces: Waverley Harrison; Amberley Wilson; Eltham Wilson

Michael McKenna is a fictional character on the New Zealand soap opera, Shortland Street. He was portrayed by Paul Gittins and was part of the original cast.

== Creation and casting ==
Established actor Paul Gittins was cast, but struggled to keep up with the fast schedule. However, after crew realized Gittins performed better towards the end of the week, all his scenes were filmed late on Fridays. After settling into the role, Gittins highly enjoyed it and learned a lot from his younger co stars. Gittins soon became exhausted by the workload and wanted diversity, he quit and the character made his final appearance as a regular on 12 May 1995.

== Storylines ==
Michael, the director of Shortland Street, supported nursing manager, Carrie Burton (Lisa Crittenden) through her accusation of murder and the two got together. However, the power couple dissolved and Michael turned to heavy drinking. He was convinced to seek help and later dated a university student. The arrival of daughter Rachel McKenna (Angela Bloomfield) put an end to the relationship and Michael soon found himself reuniting with estranged wife, Alex (Liddy Holloway). Michael was shocked and disappointed when he learned his son Jonathon (Kieren Hutchison) was gay, but ended up saving him and his boyfriend Jamie (Karl Urban) from a group of homophobes. Suffering anxiety about aging and scared that Michael was having an affair, Alex underwent plastic surgery but reacted to the medication leading to many believing Michael had purposefully tried to kill her. When she finally woke from her coma, this was disproven. Subsequently, in 1995, the marriage ended and Michael suffered a heart attack, leading to him recovering away from Ferndale. Upon his return, he and Alex decided to make another go at things and Michael sold his share of the clinic. The two departed for a lifestyle block in the country side; however, just a year later, Alex returned and announced the marriage was once again over. Several months later she returned to Michael to attempt a reconciliation. Michael returned in 1997 when Nick Harrison (Karl Burnett) called him to help his daughter Rachel with her alcohol issues. Michael returned once again in late 1998 to inform Rachel of Alex's passing while overseas. He guided her on how to stop a takeover of the hospital but suffered several massive heart attacks and died in early 1999. In 2014, Rachel used her large inheritance from Michael to start a charitable surgery company named McKenna House in his honour. In 2025 it was revealed that a research library at the hospital had been named in his honour.

== Character development ==
=== The McKennas ===
Shortland Street has a constant thoroughfare of family units to help attract and widen the target demographics. In 1992 Adrian Keeling who portrayed patriarch of the Neilson family unit, Tom, quit his role in the soap. Producers realized there would be a notable gap in demographics and the decision was made to expand on the already established character of hospital CEO, Michael McKenna. The McKenna family arrived to screens in early 1993. A writer of the show, Liddy Holloway, was cast as Michael's estranged wife Alex McKenna and Gittins would often joke that she wrote her character the best lines. Also in the family unit were teenagers, Rachel and Jonathon McKenna. The character of Jonathon was written as gay and the storyline proved both controversial and groundbreaking, with Michael's reluctance to accept his son highly topical. The family unit also saw the introduction of Alex's niece, Waverley Wilson, who stayed on the soap for many years, becoming one of its most iconic characters. The family dynamics that were brought on by the McKennas, were later praised with the show receiving a makeover in 2001 to try and comply with the benchmark set by Michael and his family. The McKenna family disbanded in 1995 when Michael and Alex departed the show. Jonathon appeared in several more stints while Rachel stayed as a central character on the soap for many years. Gittins enjoyed the introduction of the family unit, stating; "I started off as a single character, and then the family was created. I really enjoyed the father-daughter relationship because I have a young daughter. The McKenna family was incredibly dysfunctional. I enjoyed that ... We were the totally '90s dysfunctional family: conflict between the husband and wife, rebellious daughter, gay son, a wife living close to the edge, alcoholism, workaholicism, and stress. It was more exciting – and made for good drama."

== Reception ==
The homosexuality storyline involving Michael and his son, helped one man accept his own sexuality. Since leaving the show, Michael has left an archetype filled by many characters, being the "suave CEO". In 2017, stuff.co.nz journalist Fleur Mealing named Michael as the fifth character she most wanted to return for the show's 25th anniversary, citing the possibility that he survived his death. She believed the return was necessary as he was the "father" of a generation of viewers.
