= Lisa Crittenden =

Australian actress

- Born: Lisa Crittenden; 1962 (age 63–64); Williamstown, Victoria, Australia
- Occupation: Actress
- Years active: 1975–2003
- Notable work: Prisoner; Sons and Daughters; Shortland Street
- Spouse: Gary Moore (m.1986)
- Children: 2

Lisa Crittenden (born 1962) is an Australian former actress, noted for her roles in various television series, such as The Restless Years (as Briony Thompson, 1981), The Sullivans (as Sally Meredith), Prisoner (as Maxine Daniels 1982–83), Sons and Daughters (as Leigh Palmer 1985–86), Rafferty's Rules (1988) and the New Zealand produced Shortland Street (as Carrie Burton 1992–93).

She had 3 roles in drama Blue Heelers and also played a lead role in mini-series Whose Baby? and made a guest appearance as Gabrielle's mother Hecuba in Xena: Warrior Princess.

== Personal life ==
Crittenden has been married to Gary Moore, a freelance director of photography, since 1986. She currently resides in Melbourne, Australia with her husband, and two sons.

In her role as Carrie Burton in Shortland Street, Crittenden delivered the line "You're not in Guatemala now, Dr. Ropata" during a disagreement Burton had with Dr. Hone Ropata (Temuera Morrison) in the series's inaugural episode. The line has become a staple of popular culture in New Zealand.

== Filmography ==
=== Film ===
Year	Title	Role	Notes
1975	Picnic at Hanging Rock	Extra	Feature film
1976	The Devil's Playground	Extra	Feature film
1979	Snapshot	School girl	Feature film
1994	Coverstory	Donna MacKerson	
1996	Repeat Performance	Shona	Feature film

=== Television ===
Year	Title	Role	Notes
1976	Power Without Glory	Recurring guest role: Marjorie	ABC TV miniseries, 2 episodes
1980	The Sullivans	Regular role: Sally Meredith	TV series
1980	Hey Hey It's Saturday	Guest – Herself	TV series, 1 episode
1981	Bellamy	Guest role: Terri	TV series, season 1, episode 11: "A Matter of Upbringing"
1981	Holiday Island	Recurring Guest role: Susan	TV series, 2 episodes
1981–1982	The Restless Years	Recurring Guest role: Briony Thompson	TV series, 3 episodes
1982	A Country Practice	Charlene Simpson	TV series, season 2, 2 episodes
1982–1983	Prisoner	Maxine Daniels	TV series, seasons 4–5, 91 episodes
1984	A Country Practice	Heather	TV series, season 4, 2 episodes
1985–1986	Sons and Daughters	Leigh Palmer	TV series, seasons 4–5, 149 episodes
1986	Whose Baby?	Lead role: Nola Jenkins	TV miniseries, 2 episodes
1988–1990	Rafferty's Rules	Recurring role: Sandra	TV series, 5 episodes
1992–1993	Shortland Street	Regular lead role: Carrie Burton	TV series, seasons 1–2
1994	Hide Tide		TV series, season 1, 1 episode
1996	Every Woman's Dream	Bahamian Attache	TV film; NZ
1998	Xena: Warrior Princess	Hecuba	TV series, season 4, 1 episode
1999	Blue Heelers	Julie Lewis	TV series, season 6, 1 episode
2001	Blue Heelers	Tammy Lamont	TV series, season 8, 1 episode
2002	Short Cuts	Gabi's Mum	TV series, season 1, 1 episode
2003	Blue Heelers	Melanie Howe	TV series, season 10, 1 episode
