= Kirsty Knight (Shortland Street) =

- Shortland Street character
- Portrayed by: Angela Dotchin
- Duration: 1992–1998
- First appearance: 25 May 1992; Episode 1
- Last appearance: 23 February 1998
- Created by: Jason Daniel
- Introduced by: Caterina De Nave
- Book appearances: Kirsty and Lionel - Shortland Street Books (1996)
In-universe information
- Mother: Mary O'Malley
- Husband: Lionel Skeggins (1995–1998)

Kirsty Knight (previously Skeggins) is a fictional character on the New Zealand soap opera Shortland Street and was portrayed by Angela Dotchin as part of the 1992 original cast up until 1998.

Originally appearing as the clinic's blonde bombshell teenage receptionist, the character was a love interest for heart throb Stuart Neilson (Martin Henderson) but by the time the character departed after 6 years, was a major character in the soap opera. Known for her "Secret Squirrel" storylines, Kirsty was the forefront of the show in numerous storylines such as an attempted rape at the hands of villain Darryl Neilson (Mark Ferguson), exposing two murderers, a hugely popular romance with fan favourite Lionel (John Leigh) and for her comedic pairing with eccentric receptionist Marj Neilson (Elizabeth McRae). The character left the show in 1998 when she fell in love with nemesis Darryl's younger brother, Damien (Mark Ferguson).

The character was hugely popular and is remembered for her storylines, mainly her romance with Lionel and her initial appearance as the "Blonde Bombshell" archetype that would become a recurring characterisation throughout the show's history. Dotchin was nominated for two New Zealand Film and TV Awards for "Best Actress" throughout her run on the soap.

== Creation and casting ==
Kirsty was created as part of the original core cast of the show, being a teenager so that young audiences could relate to the show. Original producer Caterina De Nave credits storyline supervisor Jason Daniel as the man who created Kirsty. The character was set to debut in a storyline that saw Kirsty have a crush on teenager Stuart Neilson, only for Stuart to come out gay. However the producers pulled the storyline at the last minute and Stuart was instead written as heavily religious.

== Storylines ==
Kirsty was shown to be attracted to her co receptionist at the clinic, Marj's (Elizabeth McRae) teenage son Stuart Neilson (Martin Henderson). The two had a brief flirtation but the Catholic Stuart refused to have sex. Kirsty moved onto his brother, Darryl (Mark Ferguson) who Stuart warned Kirsty was dangerous. After being rejected by Kirsty, Darryl attempted to rape her. Kirsty and Stuart finally had sex when Stuart went into a depression. Kirsty considered leaving the hospital to work for Noel Sturgess (Martyn Sanderson), but stayed for Stuart.

In 1993 Stuart continued to reject Kirsty and she started to date much older man, Shane (Richard Hanna) but she was shocked when Darryl makes his return to the clinic. Kirsty helped clear Stuart of burglary but found herself unfulfilled dating Shane and they broke up. In 1994 Kirsty lost her job following being framed for theft by Katherine Blake (Margaret Umbers) but soon got rehired when Kirsty unveiled Katherine as a murderer. She dated Greg Feeney (Tim Balme) but he fled and left Kirsty with an HIV scare. Good friend Lionel Skeggins (John Leigh) supported her through the ordeal, but Kirsty returned to Greg. It did not last however and Kirsty and Lionel reconciled and decided to marry. However midway through the ceremony, Stuart interrupted and pronounced his love, prompted by Darryl.

Despite Stuart's intervention, the two married shortly after in 1995. The marriage started to turn rocky however and when Lionel fell into a coma due to Darryl's dodgey drugs, Kirsty confronted her nemesis on a boat, only for Darryl to drown. Following a trip to Hollywood, Kirsty and Lionel fell out and separated. They reconciled only for a truck to ram into the hospital, giving Kirsty severe amnesia and forgetting ever loving Lionel. She moved back onto badboy Greg. Kirsty realized Greg was still a junkie and returned to Lionel, with 1996 ending on the two's kiss.

In 1997 the couple realized the marriage was truly over and separated once again. Kirsty revealed Ian (David Press) as a killer and nearly got murdered. When she and Lionel were called to visit Lionel's father Wilbur (Ian Mune), Kirsty decided to divorce Lionel, only for the small plane they were in to plummet to the ground. In 1998 the two survived the crash and divorced. Kirsty was horrified when Darryl's younger brother Damien (Mark Ferguson) arrived to the street, however Damien was nothing like his brother and when he suffered extreme burns in a fire, Kirsty realized she was in love. The two moved to Wellington together to be closer to Marj.

== Character development ==
=== "Secret Squirrel" ===
Kirsty's storylines often saw the character get herself into serious trouble after taking it upon herself to investigate coworkers or friends. The first example of the characterisation occurred in early 1994, when Kirsty became suspicious of doctor Katherine Blake, suspecting her of not being legally qualified. The storyline climaxed in Katherine framing Kirsty for robbery, resulting in Kirsty resigning. One of the key examples of Kirsty's "Secret Squirrel" storyline, was in late 1994 when Kirsty discovered nemesis Darryl had faked the abduction of his own children, this resulted in Darryl manipulating brother Stuart into breaking up Kirsty and Lionel's wedding as revenge, one of the character's and the soap itself, most notable storylines. Another notable storyline based around the characterisation occurred in 1997 when Kirsty became suspicious of new doctor Ian and suspected him of trying to take over the hospital. Kirsty started to investigate Ian when he was linked to the death of Rebecca and when he was proven to be responsible, Ian attempted to drown Kirsty in a pool.

=== Kirsty and Lionel ===
In 1994 Kirsty's romance storyline's drastically changed when producers paired her with the unlikely Lionel Skeggins. Several people involved in production were skeptical that the "Beauty and the Beast" storyline could actually work, finding it unlikely the glamorous Kirsty would be attracted to the clumsy Lionel. However the unusual pairing was a hit with audiences, becoming part of the classic soap opera archetype of; The couple the audience know should be together even when the characters do not know it themselves. The couple were so successful a novel was released telling the two's story titled "Kirsty and Lionel - Shortland Street Books". The two featured in one of the most notable moments in the soap's history when the first ever cliffhanger featured on the soap centered on the wedding between the two being interrupted by Kirsty's past lover Stuart Neilson. The two got through the hiccup but after Kirsty was hit by a truck in another of the soap's notable storylines, leaving her with amnesia, she forgot ever loving Lionel and returned to ex-boyfriend Greg. However the two reconciled and the 1996 season ended on their kiss. The two's reconciliation did not last long and the two were amidst divorcing when the plane they were in crashed in the 1997 cliffhanger. However, in 1998 Lionel finally decided he wanted to be with Kirsty, only to miss her by seconds when she left to live in Wellington.

== Reception ==
In 2002, a list compiled by The New Zealand Herald listed Kirsty as the 8th best character ever to feature on the show. Dotchin received two nominations in the New Zealand Film and TV Awards, one in 1994 and another in 1997. Former Shortland Street producer, Tony Holden praised Dotchin, stating; "The issue of stardom is one of publicity and hype and b***, but the issue of what actually makes an actor loved by an audience has got very much to do with the heart and that magic behind the eyes. That girl’s got it." Dotchin received a lot of fan mail, stating in 1996; "Because Kirsty is such a loyal friend I get a lot of letters from teenagers having problems, including several from England. I think they can relate to Kirsty and they're interested in how she deals with her problems."

The rape storyline pitch was at the time so controversial, international executives worried it would "sully" the character of Kirsty. The storyline of Kirsty discovering her lost engagement ring inside a fish prompted Listener television reviewer Diana Wichtel to award it the "Most Improbable Storyline" in her 15-year reviewing of the show. Kirsty and Lionel's romance is remembered as one of the most notable storylines to ever feature on the soap. Kirsty left behind a legacy, with the "blonde bombshell" archetype quickly being filled by Minnie after Kirsty's departure. In 2012, the character was named as one of the standout characters of the show's first 20 years.
