= Andrew Robertt =

New Zealand actor

- Born: Andrew Bryan Binns; 9 March 1969 (age 57); New Zealand
- Occupations: Television and Film actor
- Height: 6 ft 2 in (188 cm)

Andrew Robertt is a New Zealand actor whose work covers a diverse range of characters across multiple genres. He studied arts and sciences at The University of Auckland, and horticulture and business management at trade school. In his earlier work he was credited as Andrew Binns.

== Filmography ==
=== Film ===
- Slow West (2015) .... Werner
- Field Punishment No. 1 (2014) (TV) .... CMO
- Pirates of the Airwaves (2014) (TV) .... William Cullen
- Siege (2012) (TV) .... Mike Burne
- Kidnapped (2005) (TV) .... Mr. Riach
- Ike: Countdown to D-Day (2004) (TV) .... 101st Airborne Lieutenant (as Andrew Robertt)
- Deceit (2004) (TV) .... Ken Spradling (as Andrew Mitchell)
- Lucy (2003) (TV) .... Bob Carroll Jr. (as Andrew Mitchell)
- You Wish! (2003) (TV) .... Stage Manager (as Andrew Binns)
- Murder in Greenwich (2002) (TV) .... Stephen Weeks (as Andrew Binns)
- Blood Crime (2002) (TV) .... Deputy David Forrest (as Andrew Binns)
- Lawless: Dead Evidence (2000) (TV) .... Graham Newby (as Andrew Binns)
- Topless Women Talk About Their Lives (1997) .... Geoff (as Andrew Binns)
- The End of the Golden Weather (1991) .... Joe Dyer (as Andrew Binns)
- An Angel at My Table (1990) .... Bruddie (as Andrew Binns)
- Ruby and Rata (1990) .... Salesman (as Andrew Binns)

=== TV series ===
- American Playboy: The Hugh Hefner Story (2017) .... James R. Thompson
- Making of the Mob: Chicago (2016) .... Frankie Yale
- Harry (2013) .... Axle
- Legend of the Seeker (2008) .... Ranssyn Fane
- Amazing Extraordinary Friends (2006) .... The Wraith
- Orange Roughies (2006) .... Leo Sullivan
- Secret Agent Men (2003) .... Casper Gecko (2003–2004) (as Andrew Robertt)
- Mataku episode "The Rocks" (2002) .... Frank
- Street Legal (2000) .... Det. Sr. Sgt. Jack Clifford (as Andrew Binns)
- Dark Knight (2000) .... Brack (as Andrew Binns)
- Duggan episode "Moving House" (1999) .... Peter Bergson (as Andrew Binns)
- The Legend of William Tell (1998) .... Xax (as Andrew Binns)
- Xena: Warrior Princess episode "Is There a Doctor in the House?" (1996) .... Hippocrates (as Andrew Binns)
- High Tide episode "The Runaways" (1995).... Danny Crenshaw
- Shortland Street (1992) .... Nurse Steve Mills (1992–1994) (as Andrew Binns)
- The New Adventures of Black Beauty (1990) .... Constable Carmody (as Andrew Binns)
- Betty's Bunch (1990) (as Andrew Binns)

=== Voice Overs ===
- Power Rangers Jungle Fury (2008) (voice) .... Rammer
- Power Rangers Mystic Force (2006) (voice) .... Morticon
- Power Rangers SPD episode "Beginnings: Part 1" (2005) (voice) .... Alien
- Power Rangers Dino Thunder episode "Golden Boy" (2004) (voice) .... Dysotron
