= Rene Naufahu =

New Zealand actor

- Born: Lee Rene Naufahu; New Zealand
- Occupations: Actor; screenwriter; director
- Years active: 1992–present
- Notable credit(s): Sam Aleni in Shortland Street; Emperor Gruumm in Power Rangers S.P.D. Mentor Ji in Power Rangers Samurai/Super Samurai
- Relatives: Joe Naufahu (brother) Jasmine Pereira (cousin)

Rene Naufahu is a New Zealand actor, screenwriter and director.

== Career ==
Naufahu is perhaps best known for being an original cast member of the New Zealand soap opera Shortland Street, playing paramedic Sam Aleni for the show's first four years. In the United States, he is better known for portraying various characters in the Power Rangers franchise, such as Emperor Grumm of Power Rangers S.P.D. and Mentor Ji from Power Rangers Samurai and Power Rangers Super Samurai.

In 2006, at the Air New Zealand Screen Awards, he won Best Performance by an Actor in a Supporting Role as Erasmus, in the Toa Fraser film No. 2. The film won the Audience Award, World Cinema - Dramatic, after sellout screenings at the 2006 Sundance Film Festival.

In 2005, he co-wrote television drama The Market with Brett Ihaka and Matthew Grainger. He was also one of the show's directors, alongside Damon Fepulea'i and Geoff Cawthorn.

He attended the Amsterdam-based Binger Institute's Script Development program in 2003.

Naufahu's first feature film as director is crime thriller The Last Saint, which began filming in September 2013.

== Criminal convictions ==
On 1 September 2017, Naufahu pleaded guilty in Auckland's District Court to six charges of indecent assault. The charges related to six women who attended private acting lessons conducted by Naufahu in Auckland between 2011 and 2013. In January 2018 he was sentenced to one year of home detention. Naufahu had an earlier conviction for common assault and wilful damage arising from an altercation in a Christchurch bar in 2001, for which he was fined by the court.

== Filmography ==
=== Film ===
Year	Film	Role
2006	Naming Number Two	Erasmus
2003	The Matrix Revolutions	Zion Gate Operator
2003	The Matrix Reloaded	Zion Gate Operator

=== Television ===
Year	Series	Role	Note
1992–1996, 2014	Shortland Street	Paramedic Sam Aleni	
1997	Hercules: The Legendary Journeys	Adamus	The Lady and the Dragon
1997	House of Sticks	Paul	
1998	All Saints	Gary Headley	"The Hard Yards"
1998	Water Rats	Tony Rock	Episode 3x20 ”Diminished Responsibility”
1998–2000	Tales of the South Seas	Mauriri Lepau	
2000	Beastmaster	Mataffa	"Tears of the Sea"
2003	Always Greener	Nathan Little	"Flesh for Fantasy" "The Always Greener Variety Hour".
2005	Power Rangers S.P.D.	Emperor Gruumm	
2011–2012	Power Rangers Samurai	Mentor Ji	
2014	Power Rangers Super Megaforce	Mentor Ji	"Samurai Surprise"
