= Paul Gittins =

New Zealand actor (born 1949)

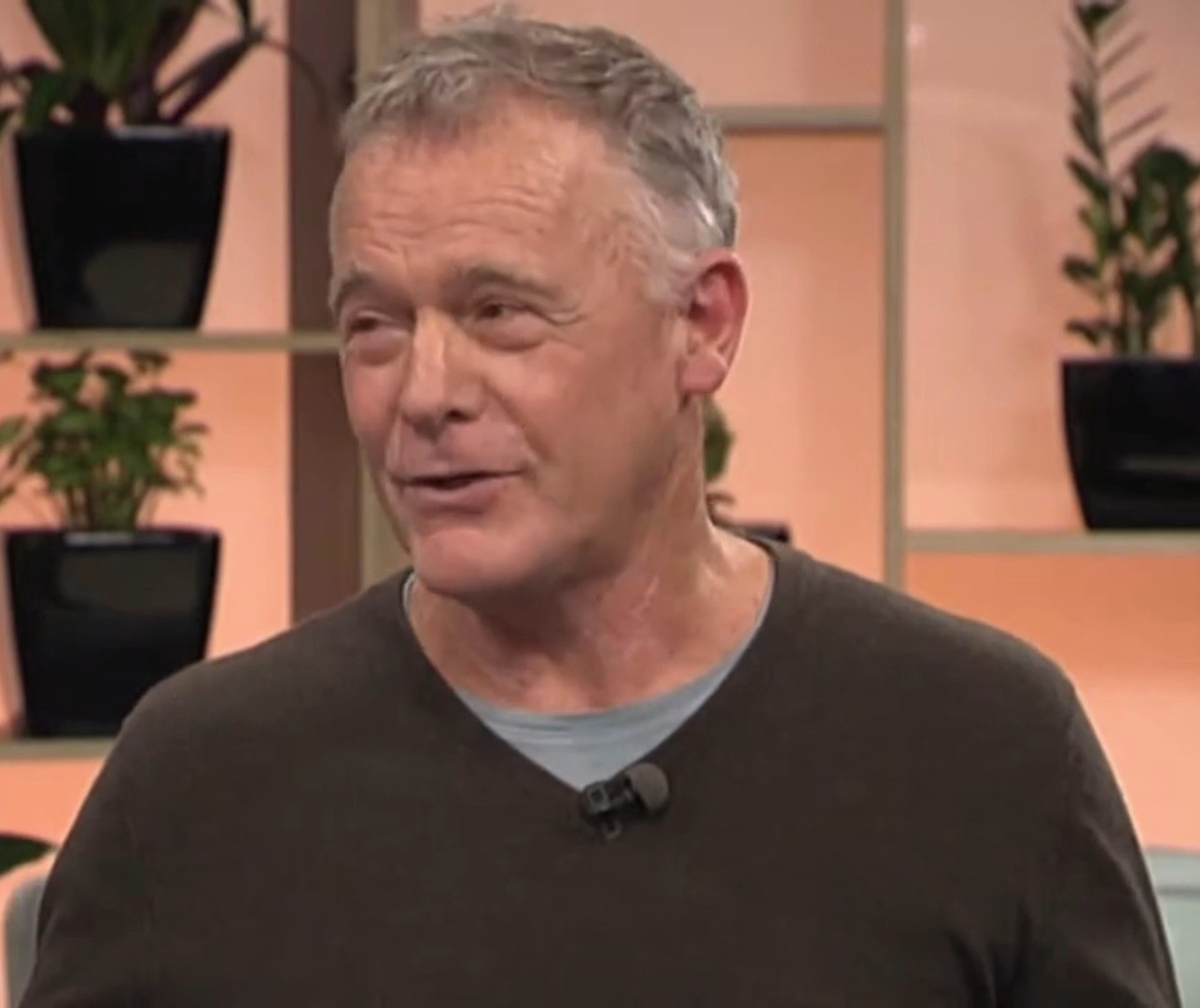
Gittins in 2018

Paul Gittins (born 1949) is a New Zealand actor who is best known for playing doctor Michael McKenna in Shortland Street from 1992 to 1995 and 1998 to 1999, and he has also appeared in The End of the Golden Weather, Xena: Warrior Princess, Hercules: The Legendary Journeys, City Life, The Whole of the Moon and Maiden Voyage.

Paul Gittins is also the presenter of "Epitaph", a program that looks at interesting epitaphs and the stories behind them. It currently airs on the Paranormal Channel in the UK.

In 2022 he was presented with a Scroll of Honour from the Variety Artists Club of New Zealand for his contribution to New Zealand entertainment.
