= Shortland Street =

New Zealand television soap opera (since 1992)

- Genre: Medical drama Soap opera
- Created by: Bettina Hollings; Caterina De Nave; Jason Daniel
- Directed by: William Livingston; Amanda Tito; Curtis Vowell; Mia Blake; Geoff Cawthorn
- Starring: (Ensemble)
- Theme music composer: Graham Bollard
- Composers: Graham Bollard (1992–2019); Sam Watson (2019–2023); William Philipson (2023–current)
- Country of origin: New Zealand
- Original language: English
- No. of seasons: 35
- No. of episodes: 8,338

Production
- Executive producers: Don Reynolds; Alan Coleman; Tim Sanders; Caterina De Nave; Rachel Lang; Tony Holden; Simon Bennett; John Barnett
- Producers: Caterina De Nave (1992); Brian Lennane (1992–1993); Tony Holden (1994–1995); Gavin Srawhan (1995–1996); Alan Coleman (1995); Judith Trye (1996–1997); Lisa Page (2000–2001); Harriet Crampton (2001–2005); Katie Wolfe (2005); Jason Daniel (2005–2008); Steven Zanoski (2009–2013); Simon Bennett (1997–2000, 2013–2016); Maxine Fleming (2016–2018, 2022–2024); Oliver Driver (2019–)
- Production locations: 8 Tolich Pl, Lincoln North, Auckland 0610 New Zealand
- Editors: Anna Benedikter; Matthew Allison
- Camera setup: Multi-camera
- Running time: 30 minutes (inc. adverts)
- Production companies: South Pacific Pictures; Grundy Television (1992–2006); Fremantle Australia (2006–2023)

Original release
- Network: TVNZ 2
- Release: 25 May 1992 – present

Shortland Street is a New Zealand prime-time soap opera and medical drama created by Bettina Hollings, Caterina De Nave and Jason Daniel, centering on the fictitious Shortland Street Hospital. The show is broadcast on TVNZ 2 and produced originally by South Pacific Pictures and subsequently by Grundy Television and its takeover company Fremantle Australia. Airing from 25 May 1992, it is New Zealand's longest-running drama and soap opera, being broadcast continuously for over 8,300 episodes and 35 years (as of November 2026). It is one of the most watched television programmes in New Zealand and is broadcast internationally in numerous countries including Canada and several European and African countries.

The show was originally screened as five half-hour episodes each week, and received mixed reviews on its premiere. After its launch, the show suffered a drop in ratings and would have been cancelled if TVNZ had not ordered a year's worth of episodes in advance. TVNZ renewed the production in early 1993 after the show's ratings picked up, and the show has since garnered "long-term public enthusiasm". Today, it is one of New Zealand's highest-rated shows, frequently making AGB Nielsen Media Research's top 5 programmes of the week, achieving an average linear daily reach of 345,000 viewers (in the year to June 2021) and is TVNZ's "most streamed show".

As of 2025, the soap airs 3 episodes a week at 7pm on TVNZ 2, with a repeat at 11pm on TVNZ 1, followed by another repeat the following day at 11am on TVNZ 2. The show was renewed for another season in mid 2025, with episodes airing as of 16 February 2026 on the same three nights a week schedule.

In early August, 2026, an announcement was made that the programme would be renewed for a 2027 season, with funding from NZ On Air confirmed. The show will also increase to four episodes per week from February 2027.

== Development ==
After the cancellation of Gloss, Television New Zealand (TVNZ) noticed the lack of New Zealand content on their channels and, in 1990, set about creating a local equivalent of the Australian soap Neighbours. Greg McGee at South Pacific Pictures wanted to base a series on the new private clinics emerging under New Zealand's Labour government and suggested the idea to scriptwriter Dean Parker, who declined due to a dislike of private medicine, so TV2 and South Pacific Pictures purchased a formula from Grundy Television, who receive a royalty cheque for every subsequent broadcast. A sum of $10 million was originally paid for an initial 230 episodes. Caterina De Nave was hired as the show's producer and subsequently travelled to Australia to work with Grundy Television to work out the concept for the five times-a-week soap opera. TV2 programmer Bettina Hollings suggested the setting of a hospital after reading an article detailing ideal locations of a drama, which included hospitals, police stations and schools. De Nave worked with several storyliners including Jason Daniel to outline the show.

De Nave noticed Neighbours and Home and Away had a generally straightforward Australian cast and wanted the cast of the show to be culturally diverse to reflect New Zealand society. She also wanted the cast to have strong female characters to attract a female audience. Daniel created the character of Kirsty while De Nave created Meredith and Ken Catran created Hone. The character of Stuart was originally planned to be gay but the plans made TVNZ nervous and were scrapped. De Nave also wished to counter-stereotype races and made Polynesian Sam Aleni a paramedic as there was only one paramedic of Polynesian descent throughout New Zealand. De Nave decided to make the setting that of a private hospital as it reflected New Zealand medicine at the time.

== History ==
The longest running characters Chris and Rachel as they were in 1993 and 16 years later in 2009

=== 1990s ===
Shortland Street's first episode aired on 25 May 1992 to mixed reviews. Ratings were originally high after a successful marketing campaign, but fell steadily throughout the year until 1993 when they rose dramatically. The show would have been cancelled in the first year if it was not for the fact TVNZ ordered a year's worth of episodes.

=== 2000s ===
With high public interest in the show and a viewing figure of a constant 600,000, Shortland Street received more sets and the outdated nursing uniforms were replaced. In 2000, an Australian consultant drastically changed the show so that it would suit the 21st century tone of New Zealand. This included transitioning the hospital to a public hospital, bringing in low income families and writing off 14 characters. Michael Galvin and Angela Bloomfield were brought back as their characters Chris Warner and Rachel McKenna and the show appointed a new producer.

The show reached huge ratings in 2007 when a Serial Killer Storyline was introduced, with five characters meeting their demise. Episode 4000 saw the return of series original Dr. Hone Ropata for a six-week stint in 2008.

=== 2010s ===
Shortland Street aired its first ever 90-minute episode on 2 August 2010. The episode featured Chris discovering he had a son with series original Alison Raynor in 1996, and the conclusion to the three-year Kieran Mitchell storyline which saw the shows second highest ever ratings. Shortland Street has since made the 90-minute episode an annual feature. On 18 April 2011, Shortland Street screened its first episode in high definition.

In July 2011, Shortland Street achieved a New Zealand first when it made its 2011 feature-length episode available to purchase via Facebook, becoming the second ever TV show in the world to use this technology. In August 2011, All Blacks Keven Mealamu, Anthony Boric and Jerome Kaino filmed a scene that aired on the opening night of the 2011 Rugby World Cup on 9 September. The show added short transition scenes in which two characters in the hospital elevator discussed the wins or losses (the latter never actually happening) the All Blacks endured during the tournament.

On 15 December 2016, Shortland Street released a charity single featuring Lionel Wellington and J.J. Fong to raise money for Starship Children's Health hospital.

On 25 May 2017, Shortland Street celebrated 25 years on New Zealand television.

=== 2020s ===
Production of Shortland Street was suspended on 24 March 2020 due to the COVID-19 pandemic and the nationwide lockdown from 26 March to 28 April 2020, and TVNZ 2 reduced broadcasting the show to three episodes per week to spread out the existing backlog of episodes. Production resumed on 30 April with some restrictions, such as intimate scenes not being allowed. The show returned to five episodes per week on 29 June 2020.

In early August 2022, the Minister of Health Andrew Little and a Health New Zealand spokesperson confirmed that Shortland Street and TVNZ's advertising division TVNZ Blacksand Partnerships would be working with the Health Ministry, Health NZ, and New Zealand Nurses Organisation (NZNO) to produce the "Real Nurses" multimedia marketing campaign to recruit nursing workers from both domestic and overseas markets in order to address the country's shortage of nurses. Little confirmed that the Real Nurses multimedia campaign would be integrated into the television series' storyline. In response, NZNO President Anne Daniels criticised the series for misrepresenting the difficult working conditions for nurses while National Party MP Chris Penk expressed concerns about the collaboration between the Government and creative industry. In response to criticism, Little stated that the "Real Nurses" campaign had been created by the NZNO, which had approached the Government to secure financial support for it. Auckland University of Technology (AUT) communication professor Dr. Rosser Johnson expressed support for the "Real Nurses" multimedia campaign, arguing that it could encourage younger demographics to consider nursing as a career and rejected claims that it would serve as government propaganda.

In 2024 South Pacific Pictures CEO Kelly Martin said that the company was in "close conversations" with TVNZ about funding the programme after TVNZ cut several programmes due to financial pressure. In July 2024, it was confirmed Shortland Street would be reduced from five to three episodes a week, beginning in 2025. The cut also caused the series to reduce some of its sets. In May 2025, staff members were concerned about the future of the series, with speculation emerging from TVNZ about its possible cancellation. TVNZ later issued a statement saying that there are no plans to cancel Shortland Street in 2026, and that the broadcaster's focus is to deliver its current season to viewers. In August 2026, TVNZ and South South Pacific Pictures confirmed funding from New Zealand on Air and the Screen Production Rebate would see the show return for the 2027 season at four nights a week. In a statement responding to the announcement, TVNZ shared of the show's performance “It’s currently the second-highest-rating show on TVNZ 2, with audiences tracking in line with 2025 across broadcast and TVNZ+.”

=== Spinoffs ===
Since 2018, there are weekly spinoffs during Christmas and New Year breaks that are exclusively streamed on TVNZ On Demand, however these have not aired since the 2021-2022 annual hiatus. The most recent being Shortland Street: Retribution, the first spinoff with an R16 (Violence and Coarse Language) rating, with the storyline revolving around Constable Curtis Hannah (Jaden Daniel) and Esther Samuels (Ngahuia Piripi). The series is also the first spinoff to be set in Christchurch and the South Island.

== Characters ==
Shortland Street stars an ensemble cast. Most of the characters either work at Shortland Street Hospital, or are relations to employees of the hospital.

Since 1992, many notable faces have appeared on the soap. Only one character remains from the original cast: Chris Warner. Though taking a 4-year break, Chris has featured in the show the longest of the current cast, outstaying all of his family, who either died or left. Rachel McKenna, another long-standing character as of 2024, first appeared in the soap in 1993 and has made regular appearances since. Nick Harrison, another long-running character, disappeared from the show in 2005. Currently Esther Samuels is the longest-running female character, joining the show in 2015.

Characters on the show attribute and portray several different demographics found in New Zealand. These range from the rich and well-off (such as Chris Warner) to the struggling and poor (Wendy Cooper). Other areas covered include different ethnicities, sexualities, genders, and abilities. In the first year of the show, it was decided that CEO Michael McKenna's personal assistant, Jenny, should be a solo mother to help draw in that demographic, who statistically would be watching TV at 7 pm. The show has also had a long string of families, such as the Warners, McKennas, Harrisons, Crombies, Hudsons, Jeffries, Valentines, McKays, Coopers, Avia-Levis, Hannahs, and Kings and various teenagers, helping young audiences and families relate to the show.

== Production ==
The working title was The Shortland Street Project after its planned filming location in a TVNZ-owned studio at 74 Shortland Street in Auckland Central. However, the studio was found to be too small for the required sets, and the production studio was moved to a warehouse in Browns Bay. After running through many name options, the original working-title was chosen and subsequently truncated to simply Shortland Street. The name subsequently is a homage to the Shortland Street studios, which were home to New Zealand's first regular television broadcast in 1960, and were home to TVNZ and its predecessors' Auckland operations until TVNZ moved to its new purpose-built television centre on Victoria Street West in 1990.

Shortland Street is produced by South Pacific Pictures, with assistance from Fremantle and Television New Zealand. In the first few years, the production was also assisted by New Zealand On Air; since 1996, funding from the government agency ended and the show moved entirely to advertising revenue.

Today, most of the filming for Shortland Street occurs at South Pacific Pictures West Auckland studios, with Ferndale High School scenes being filmed at the nearby Waitākere College. The exterior shots of the hospital are filmed on location at the Waitakere Studios at an existing section of a building dressed up to appear as the facade of a hospital entrance. Location scenes are filmed in Auckland, but other locations, including Fiji, Mt Ruapehu, Rotorua and Rarotonga have been used.

Originally, Shortland Street was filmed at Browns Bay on the North Shore until their relocation to purpose built studios in West Auckland in 2000. The original Ferndale High School was played by a North Shore college until the studio relocated. When cast members are hired their contracts are either 4 days, 1 week, 2 weeks, 6 weeks, 6 months or a year.

While the name Shortland Street is based on an actual street in Auckland CBD, the only place where the scenes are actually filmed in Auckland CBD is the fictitious Q Road, which is the actual Karangahape Road, better known as K' Rd.

High definition production of Shortland Street started in early 2011, with the first HD episode broadcast on 18 April 2011 on the Freeview HD and Sky platforms.

On 24 July 2018 It was announced that the show will air six nights a week starting in September 2018.

The show has had a reputation for being raunchy and controversial with the very first episode of the show featuring a sex scene between resident "Dr. Love" Chris Warner and his aerobics instructor. Another early controversy was that of a lesbian kiss between Meredith Fleming and Annie Flynn with several complaints made to the Broadcasting Standards Authority (BSA) but it went no further. It was not until 2008 that the show received its first ever BSA warning, when it featured an oral sex scene in mid-2008 between sexually confused Gerald and a fellow man. A few months later, the show received a second warning for an episode in August 2008 depicting the brutal murder of Craig Valentine, who was beaten unconscious, then set alight in his car. Again, a few months later, the show received yet another warning about a scene in January 2009 where Tania Jeffries hit a gang leader in the head with a hammer.

Scenes aired in April 2010 sparked criticism when Leanne Miller and her daughter Nicole stated that the city of Tauranga was not "gay friendly".

The show caused controversy in August 2010 when the character of Sophie McKay was shown to be being stalked by her university lecturer who she had been dating. This upset the family of murdered girl Sophie Elliott who was killed by her university tutor, Clayton Weatherston, who she had been dating. The similarities upset the families with producer Steven Zanoski saying: "the storyline was a classic and not inspired by real events."

The show's production department received several complaints following the lesbian love storyline involving Maia Jeffries and Jennifer Mason.

A storyline aired in April 2011 which featured the Cooper Family try to go to the beach, but they get confronted by a group of Māori who demand money. This sparked criticism with some saying it was discrimination against Māori people. Maori adviser Ngamaru Raerino stated that viewers shouldn't have jumped to conclusions and should have let the storyline completely unfold which reveals the group are protesting against a corrupt camp owner who had been polluting the beach.

In September 2011, Shortland Street was identified as one of the main influences to people who self-harm, airing two storylines involving suicide attempts.

During 2017, one episode ended with a cliffhanger featuring Chris Warner confronting his son Harry with a 'dick pic' he found on his tablet computer. A video clip of the scene, including the line "Please tell me that is not your penis!", went viral worldwide, even to a point of parody on Jimmy Kimmel Live! recreated by said host and Alec Baldwin. The line was voted the New Zealand Quote of the Year in a contest held by Massey University.

In December 2023, Shortland Street started uploading episodes to YouTube, starting from the first season in 1992. As of 2026, older seasons are still being uploaded regularly, often one season at a time.

=== Linguistic and academic significance ===
Beyond its commercial success, Shortland Street has been recognized by as a breakthrough for New Zealand's television industry, through the early support of New Zealand on Air.

== International ==
=== Australia ===
In Australia, free-to-air digital channel 7Two aired episodes about three years behind until August 2015. Previous Australian broadcasters include: ABC (2010–2011), UKTV (1997–2000), and SBS briefly between 1994 and 1995. The show aired on Fox One for several years, before Foxtel abruptly dropped the show in November 2020, which was attracting only 7,000 viewers per episode overnight (and another 7,000 in consolidated viewing figures). As Shortland Street qualifies as Australian content under the free trade agreement between the two countries, its future on Australian television became unclear for a time. However, it was announced on 16 December 2020 that the series had been picked up by SBS Viceland. The remainder of Season 28 (2020) aired on the SBS On Demand service, before SBS Viceland started broadcasting new episodes in sync with New Zealand (the first time this had happened on Australian television) beginning with Season 29 from 11 January 2021. Whilst the show returned on SBS Viceland for the 2023 season, it abruptly disappeared after two weeks. An SBS spokesperson told TV Tonight, “SBS VICELAND originally acquired 250 episodes of Shortland Street for the 2022 season, which only produced 240 episodes. As a result, we still had an extra 10 episodes to play out between 23rd Jan – 3rd Feb.” Following a search for a new broadcast partner, the show was then picked up by 7plus. Episodes were released weekdays at 3pm from 3rd July 2023, picking up from the same cliffhanger that SBS initially broadcast. As of 2026, 7plus continues to release new episodes, 3 days a week, 6 months behind their NZ release.

=== Ireland ===
Shortland Street debuted on RTÉ One on 30 September 1997, commencing with episode 675, the season finale of season 3. It aired on weekdays at 17.30 for four years, before moving to 16.50 on 2 January 2001 after RTÉ began broadcasting Neighbours at 17.30 on RTÉ Two. In later years, it was shown in the mornings, with times varying between 11.00 and 12.30 due to RTÉ One’s flexible daytime schedule. In 2020, a repeat screening was added at 17.30 on RTÉ Two, with Neighbours following at 18.00.

Following the final episode of Neighbours on RTÉ One on 3 August 2022, Shortland Street was moved into its former timeslot, airing weekdays at 14.00 on RTÉ One with a repeat at 18.00 on RTÉ Two. This scheduling pattern continued until 18 September 2023, when Neighbours returned to Irish television, resuming its previous 14.00 and 18.00 timeslots on RTÉ One and RTÉ Two respectively. Shortland Street subsequently moved back to a morning timeslot on RTÉ One only, with no repeat airing on RTÉ Two.

Episodes broadcast in Ireland are approximately four years (around 1,000 episodes) behind the current broadcasts in New Zealand. RTÉ has aired the show continuously since 1997, making Ireland one of the few countries to have screened the series without interruption since its debut.

=== Pacific ===
In Fiji, the show has been on air since 1994 screening weekdays on Fiji One usually around 8:30 pm weekdays. It is one of the most popular shows in Fiji. The show is screened on Cook Island Television at 8.00 pm weekdays. It is one of the most popular shows in the Cook Islands.

=== United Kingdom ===
In the UK, the series was originally screened on various regions of the ITV network from 1993 to 2003. From 29 March 1993, Central was the first ITV region to screen the soap, beginning in the timeslot 15:20–15:50. However, in September 1993, the start time for children's programming block CITV was moved to 15:30, so Shortland Street was moved to 13:55. From April 1994 to 2000, it was shown in an early evening timeslot, first at 17:10–17:40 (immediately before the ITN Early Evening News) and, later at 17:30–18:00. Eventually, the serial was moved back to the earlier slot, 13:00–13:30, from 12 June 2000 and it remained there until the Autumn 2002 when it was moved again to 14:30–15:00. Around March 1996, Central Television renewed its contract; by then the series claimed to have a potential national audience of 15 million viewers.

Meridian became the second region to start the series in mid-1993 at around 14:30 until late 2002. Anglia followed in April 1994 and, like Central, aired the show at 17:10, until March 1999 when it was moved to the daytime slot, within a year the series was dropped. Ulster began broadcasting in April 1994, at 14:50. From May 1994, Border and Granada started showing the series as a replacement for A Country Practice (although some regions continued to air both), broadcast in the afternoons at their own pace in various daytime slots. In January 1995, Tyne Tees and Yorkshire started the series as a replacement for The Young Doctors. By 1999, Granada, Yorkshire and Tyne Tees had all dropped the series entirely, opting for local programming instead, while Border switched the series to a 17:10 slot. By 2001, it was moved to an earlier afternoon timeslot until it was dropped altogether in the summer of 2003.

Grampian also started the series in 1994 but it was dropped by late 1998. Scottish has never broadcast Shortland Street. HTV started the series in August 1994, mostly in an afternoon slot but also in an early evening slot for a short time. The series was dropped in early 2000, but reappeared again that May.

From January 2003, the Carlton-owned ITV franchises including Central Television, Westcountry, HTV and Carlton-London networked Shortland Street in the 14:30–15:00 slot, Monday to Wednesday, with a Thursday episode added a few months later. A special programme was aired (presented by stalwart Shortland Street cast members Michael Galvin (Chris Warner) and Angela Bloomfield (Rachel McKenna)) introducing new viewers from Westcountry and Carlton-London to the show. Viewers in the HTV region skipped a large number of episodes to bring it in line with Central. However, Shortland Street failed to attract a significant audience in its new afternoon slot and was axed completely by ITV, being last shown on 28 August 2003, finishing at episode 2367. Central had shown the serial consecutively for more than 10 years.

Shortland Street returned to British screens on 23 August 2010, when Living began airing two episodes a day from the 2007 season with episodes 3736/3737 which originally aired in New Zealand on 21/22 May 2007 beginning on 23 August 2010 at 15.00–16.00 (and repeated at 10.00 the following day). However, four weeks into its run, the morning repeats were dropped by Living, and as of Monday 20 September moving from 15:00 to 16:00 and 12:00–13:00. As from Monday 27 September 2010, it was shown on Living Loves from 18:00 to 19:00 Monday to Friday with five repeat episodes shown on Saturday and Sunday mornings. After slightly more than two months on-air, it was cancelled by Sky with the final episode shown on 29 October 2010.

The show has not aired in the UK since. However, Amazon Freevee announced on 1 December 2023 that Shortland Street was being added to its UK streaming service. On 6 December 2023, Freevee uploaded Season 30 (2021) and Season 31 (2022) in their entirety, totalling more than 500 episodes.

In 2025, it was announced that STV Player would start streaming new episodes of Shortland Street in line with New Zealand from 17 February 2025, 15 years after its last air date.

=== Canada ===
In Canada, the series was aired on the Aboriginal Peoples Television Network during 2001 and 2002.

=== South Africa ===
In previous years, South Pacific Pictures publicity has claimed the show was sold to South Africa. Journalists have used it to demonstrate Shortland Street's interracial appeal.

=== Ukraine ===
A licensed version of the show started production in Ukraine in 2016 called "Central Hospital" (Центральна лікарня) with an initial run of 60 episodes.

=== Seychelles ===
The series aired on SBC Television in 1996.

=== Zimbabwe ===
Shortland Street was broadcast on Zimbabwe Broadcasting Corporation's TV 1.
