= List of Shortland Street characters introduced in 1998 =

The following is a list of characters that first appeared in the New Zealand soap opera Shortland Street in 1998, by order of first appearance.

== Damien Neilson ==
Damien Neilson
- Shortland Street character
- Portrayed by: Mark Ferguson
- Duration: 1998
- First appearance: 30 January 1998
- Last appearance: 23 February 1998
- Introduced by: Simon Bennett
In-universe information
- Father: Tom Neilson
- Mother: Marj Brasch
- Stepfather: Laurie Brasch
- Brothers: Darryl Neilson; Patrick Neilson; Stuart Neilson
- Half-sisters: Jane Fitzgerald
- Nephews: Robert Neilson
- Nieces: Melissa Neilson; Rebecca Stanton

Damien Neilson was the identical younger brother of the villainous Darryl (Mark Ferguson). Damien was created following the resignation of Angela Dotchin (who portrayed Kirsty Knight). Producers planned for Kirsty to leave the show with her true love and the obvious choices were Stuart (Martin Henderson) or Darryl Neilson. There were however several issues, Henderson was busy, and Ferguson's character had been killed off as the result of a contractual dispute. Ultimately, Ferguson was brought back to the show as the only unseen brother in the Neilson family unit.

In 1993, Damien rang his mother Marj (Elizabeth McRae) and announced regret at not being able to attend father, Tom's (Adrian Keeling) funeral. In mid 1995 Marj informed Jenny (Maggie Harper) that she was not close to Damien as he was the third child, and thus she didn't often speak of him. In 1998, Damien arrived at the clinic to a very shocked Kirsty Knight, whom Darryl had tried to rape several years beforehand. However, Damien and Kirsty bonded, and she realised he was vastly different from his deceased brother. The home for sexually deviant teenagers that Damien ran caught alight and Damien was seriously injured. He required intensive surgery in Wellington and Kirsty realised she loved him. The two departed Ferndale in early 1998.

== Logan Patterson ==
Logan Patterson
- Shortland Street character
- Portrayed by: Caleb Ross
- Duration: 1998
- First appearance: 11 February 1998
- Last appearance: 1998
- Introduced by: Simon Bennett

Logan Patterson appeared in two stints throughout 1998. At first, Logan was a 15-year-old sexual delinquent, sentenced to spend time in a house run by Damien Neilson (Mark Ferguson). Logan showed great progress but after the devastating fire that destroyed the house, Logan was not seen for several months. He returned in May having been fostered and sent to Ferndale High as a classmate of Shelley Crombie (Natalie Dennis). The two initially clashed but soon started to date and Shelley fell pregnant. She aborted the child and Logan soon left school.

== Earl Crombie ==
Earl Crombie
- Shortland Street character
- Portrayed by: Murray Keane
- Duration: 1998–1999
- First appearance: 10 April 1998
- Last appearance: 1999
- Introduced by: Simon Bennett
In-universe information
- Wife: Moira Lafferty (1978–99)
- Sons: Jordan Crombie; Blake Crombie; Maddy Crombie
- Daughters: Shelley Crombie
- Nephews: Eamon Dempsey

Earl Crombie was mentioned in dialogue for months before being introduced as the husband of Moira Crombie (Geraldine Brophy). Earl finally arrived at Ferndale from overseas during the clinic's talent quest but after the family fell into further financial strife, Earl was forced to move overseas for a job. The Crombies visited him for New Year 1999. Earl returned later in the year when his son Maddy (Joseph Greer) was diagnosed with leukemia and shocked Moira when he purchased a fast-food caravan. However, the caravan was vandalized, and the relationship went on the rocks as Earl had not insured it. Even with the strained marriage, Moira was devastated when Earl died after a drink driving accident.

== Luke Billingham ==
Luke Billingham
- Shortland Street character
- Portrayed by: Greg Freeman
- Duration: 1998–99
- First appearance: 16 May 1998
- Last appearance: 19 June 1999
- Introduced by: Simon Bennett
In-universe information
- Father: Lionel Skeggins
- Mother: Judy Billingham
- Wife: Josie Bergman (1999—)
- Sons: Unnamed son
- Grandfathers: Wilbur Skeggins

Luke Billingham first appeared in mid-1998. He was the illegitimate lovechild of Lionel Skeggins (John Leigh) and Judy Billingham (Stephanie McKellar-Smith) who was born in the early 1980s. Lionel was shocked to discover he had a son but quickly bonded with Luke. Luke soon came into trouble for his frequent pornography use and eventually quit his habit. Lionel's girlfriend Mackenzie (Ingrid Park) convinced Luke that Lionel did not want him, and he fled Ferndale, only to narrowly survive a severe bus crash. Mackenzie apologized and Luke returned to Ferndale. He began to date Josie Bergman (Karamia Muller) but following the disappearance of Lionel, Luke began to get drugged and manipulated by his father's villainous and by now unstable wife - Mackenzie. Josie fell pregnant and after a brief breakup, the two married and left Ferndale. Several months later it was announced that Josie had given birth to a baby boy.

== Mackenzie Choat ==
Mackenzie Choat
- Shortland Street character
- Portrayed by: Ingrid Park
- Duration: 1998–99
- First appearance: 16 June 1998
- Last appearance: 8 June 1999
- Introduced by: Simon Bennett
In-universe information
- Occupation: Psychiatrist
- Husband: Lionel Skeggins (1999)
- Stepsons: Luke Billingham

Dr. Mackenzie Choat was the villainous psychiatrist who first appeared in mid-1998. Mackenzie began to date Lionel Skeggins (John Leigh) but when she discovered Oscar (Christopher Brown) had raped Minnie (Katrina Devine), Oscar framed her for fraud and Mackenzie lost her job. Oscar was found bludgeoned and an increasingly unhinged Mackenzie married Lionel before he realised she was the culprit and fled. Lionel went missing and was suspected dead, leading Mackenzie to desperately sleep with Frank Malone (Christopher Hobbs) and drug Lionel's son Luke (Greg Freeman) so he would stay with her. Caroline Buxton (Tandi Wright) realised Mackenzie was Oscar's attacker and brought the comatose Oscar to the hospital to scare her. Mackenzie discovered the coma was fake and attacked Oscar, before exploding his hospital room and fleeing with the money he had stolen from the hospital. However, as she fled, Greg Feeney (Tim Balme) sneakily took the money, leaving her with nothing.

In 2012, Park announced her intention to eventually return to the soap, so as to clear Mackenzie's villainous name. She stated, "what did she ever do that was so bad? So, she got rid of Oscar Henry, big deal. Heck, she was doing the world a favour. That guy was one bad egg."

== Daniel Buchanan ==
Daniel Buchanan
- Shortland Street character
- Portrayed by: Jack Campbell
- Duration: 1998–99, 2001
- First appearance: 22 July 1998
- Last appearance: 2 March 2001
- Introduced by: Simon Bennett (1998); Harriet Crampton (2001)
In-universe information
- Occupation: Doctor
- Brothers: Laurence Buchanan
- Wife: Rachel McKenna (1999–2001)

Dr. Daniel Buchanan was portrayed by Jack Campbell from 1998 to 1999 and again in 2001. He arrived as the new doctor in 1998 and instantly attracted the attention of business manager Rachel McKenna (Angela Bloomfield). The two started to date and when Daniel left for America in 1999, Rachel followed and several months later it was announced the two had married. Rachel returned in 2001 and announced she had left Daniel when he cheated on her. He returned days later and tried to win Rachel back. After Rachel refused to say she loved him, Daniel left New Zealand and the two got divorced.

== Oscar Henry ==
Oscar Henry was the manipulative and controlling replacement business manager for Jenny Harrison (Maggie Harper). Oscar was portrayed by Christopher Brown and most famous for his rape of Minnie Crozier (Katrina Devine).

== Mark Shawn ==
Mark Shawn
- Shortland Street character
- Portrayed by: Tony MacIver
- Duration: 1998
- First appearance: 21 September 1998
- Last appearance: 23 November 1998
- Introduced by: Simon Bennett
In-universe information
- Occupation: Paramedic (until 1998)

Mark Shawn was the paramedic who replaced Donna Heka (Stephanie Tauevihi) as Rangi's (Blair Strang) ambulance partner. Arriving in September, Mark would soon take over as Shortland Street's solo ambulance officer after Rangi would be falsely accused of being the serial basher who'd been going around Ferndale assaulting elderly women, along with breaking into Donna's flat and assaulting her before being fought off. Rangi would flee into hiding, but not before suspecting Mark of being the basher due to having an injured leg the day after Donna fought off the basher. After Rangi returned to Ferndale and did some detective work, Mark would attack and kidnap Rangi, revealing Rangi to be correct and Mark to be the basher. Rangi would break free and would help Donna capture Mark as Mark again attacked Donna. Mark was then arrested and never seen again.

== Dean Cochrane ==
Dean Cochrane
- Shortland Street character
- Portrayed by: Greg Johnson
- Duration: 1998–2001
- First appearance: 10 November 1998
- Last appearance: March 2001
- Introduced by: Simon Bennett
In-universe information
- Wife: Moira Crombie (2000–)
- Daughters: Erin Kingston
- Stepsons: Jordan Crombie; Blake Crombie; Maddy Crombie
- Stepdaughters: Shelley Crombie

Dean Cochrane first appeared in late 1998. The character was axed alongside many other cast members as part of a revamp in 2001. Dean was the childhood love of Moira Crombie (Geraldine Brophy), however the clinic was shocked with the revelation that Moira had spent time in prison for crime Dean committed. He apologized and shouted her and the family a free trip to visit Moira's husband Earl (Murray Keane) as the year ended. Following Earl's death in 1999, Dean and Moira realised they were in love and got together as the new millennium came in. Dean and Moira married, and he was shocked to discover he had a daughter, Erin Kingston (Emma Lahana). When Dean accused Moira's nephew Eamon (Neill Rea) of being a rapist, the couple briefly separated until Dean's theory proved to be true. In 2001 Dean decided to leave Ferndale to be closer to Erin and the Crombies followed soon after to help run a Bed and breakfast motel.
