= List of Shortland Street characters introduced in 1999 =

The following is a list of characters that first appeared in the New Zealand soap opera Shortland Street in 1999, by order of first appearance.

== Natasha Heremaia ==
Natasha Heremaia
- Shortland Street character
- Portrayed by: Michelle Stewart
- Duration: 1999, 2001, 2003–04
- First appearance: 19 April 1999
- Last appearance: 23 July 2004
- Introduced by: Simon Bennett (1999, 2001); Harriet Crampton (2003)
In-universe information
- Father: Rangi Heremaia
- Mother: Terry Munroe
- Stepmother: Donna Heka
- Half-brothers: Toka Heremaia
- Grandfathers: Joe Bennett
- Grandmothers: Rona Munroe; Hana Heremaia
- Uncles: Matt Bennett; Joshua Bennett

Natasha "Tash" Heremaia (also Munroe) first appeared in a guest role in 1999. Tash was Rangi Heremaia's (Blair Strang) illegitimate daughter whom he looked after when her mother Terry (Pip Hall) proved unsuitable. However, Rangi bought the two a flat and Tash moved out. In 2001 Tash and Terry moved in with Rangi and Donna Heka (Stephanie Tauevihi) when their flat became rundown and she was devastated when Rangi was found dead. She and Terry moved out once again. 2 years later Terry dumped Tash on Donna's doorstep after she got into legal trouble. Tash refused to accept Donna and her partner Chris Warner (Michael Galvin) but eventually was fostered by the two. Tash was manipulated by Dominic Thompson (Shane Cortese) into claiming Chris had molested her, splitting Donna and Chris up. Tash fell into a bad crowd and began to bully Scarlett Valentine (Nicole Thomson). When Tash eventually befriended Scarlett, she too became a target for the bullies. In mid-2004 Terry returned and decided to take Tash over to Australia. Donna interjected but ended up going with the two to start a new life.

== Jordan Crombie ==
Jordan Crombie
- Shortland Street character
- Portrayed by: Cameron Smith
- Duration: 1999
- First appearance: 4 May 1999
- Last appearance: 1999
- Introduced by: Simon Bennett
In-universe information
- Father: Earl Crombie
- Mother: Moira Cochrane
- Brothers: Blake Crombie; Maddy Crombie
- Sisters: Shelley Crombie
- First cousins: Eamon Dempsey

Jordan Crombie appeared in 1999 and was the final installment to the Crombie family unit. Moira Crombie (Geraldine Brophy) was delighted at Jordan's appearance and when her youngest son, Maddy (Joseph Greer) developed leukemia, it looked like Jordan was the only possible blood donor. Jordan was reluctant and when Moira caught him in bed with a male chemist, Ewan Douglas (Craig Muller), she struggled to accept her son's sexuality. The two soon reconciled and after HIV tests, Jordan proved clean and successfully saved Maddy with a blood donation. He and Ewan later left the street.

The scene where Moira discovered Jordan in bed with another man proved so controversial at the time, producers requested the scene be heavily edited to tone down the content.

== Blake Crombie ==
Blake Crombie
- Shortland Street character
- Portrayed by: Jesse Peach
- Duration: 1999–2001
- First appearance: 9 July 1999
- Last appearance: 19 April 2001
- Introduced by: Simon Bennett
In-universe information
- Father: Earl Crombie
- Mother: Moira Cochrane
- Brothers: Jordan Crombie; Maddy Crombie
- Sisters: Shelley Crombie
- First cousins: Eamon Dempsey

Blake Crombie made his first appearance in 1999 and was portrayed by Jesse Peach. The character was axed alongside his family in 2001 during a revamp of the soap. Blake arrived following the news his younger brother Maddy (Joseph Greer) had been diagnosed with leukemia. The following year he clashed with his new step sister, Erin Kingston (Emma Lahana) but ended up developing a crush on her. In 2001 he started to hang around with Marshall Heywood (Paul Reid) however Marshall began to film the Crombies in their house and their friendship ceased. When the family decided to move to Australia, Blake opted to live with another family member as his crush on Erin had developed too intensely.

== Laura Hall ==
Laura Hall
- Shortland Street character
- Portrayed by: Larissa Matheson
- Duration: 1999–2000
- First appearance: 22 June 1999
- Last appearance: 29 May 2000
- Introduced by: Simon Bennett
In-universe information
- Occupation: Doctor

Dr. Laura Hill was a character created specifically to undergo a plot where Caroline Buxton (Tandi Wright) would realize she was attracted to women. Larissa Matheson had auditioned for nearly 20 different roles before she landed Laura, in what she called: " a case of waiting for the right part." Laura arrived in early 1999 and after getting a job at the clinic, struck up a friendship with Caroline. Several months later Caroline asked Laura to be her bridesmaid for her wedding to Alan Dubrovsky (Malcolm Murray). However Caroline called off the wedding when it became clear she had fallen in love with Laura and the two started a controversial relationship. However, after an argument Caroline slept with Greg Feeney (Tim Balme), fell pregnant and left Laura. In 2000 the clinic staff were shocked to discover Laura came from a family of extensive wealth and she soon began to date Madeline Trent (Miranda Harcourt). In May Laura unexpectedly suffered a massive heart attack and died.
