= Caroline Buxton =

Fictional character

- Shortland Street character
- Portrayed by: Tandi Wright
- Duration: 1995–2000
- First appearance: 13 November 1995; Episode 891
- Last appearance: 17 February 2000
- Introduced by: Gavin Strawhan
In-universe information
- Occupation: Nurse; Receptionist
- Mother: Barbara Buxton

Caroline Buxton is a fictional character on the New Zealand soap opera Shortland Street, who was portrayed by Tandi Wright from late 1995 to early 2000.

The character went through numerous storylines throughout her 4 years on the show, including; a long running romance with badboy Greg Feeney (Tim Balme), a euthanasia storyline that saw Caroline jailed for murder and a high-profile lesbian love affair, the first of its kind on New Zealand television.

Since departing in 2000, Caroline is remembered as a favourable character and her two major storylines, the 1997 euthanasia episodes and the lesbian romance saga have been noted as two of the most iconic storylines to feature on the soap.

== Creation and casting ==
Tandi Wright was offered a role on the soap in 1995, to which she declined, preferring to finish her acting degree. She was then offered the role of Caroline, a receptionist at the clinic. Wright accepted but was astonished at how much the soap took over her life. Despite this she enjoyed working alongside Tim Balme, Robyn Malcolm and Katie Wolfe. Wright eventually felt Caroline's storyline's were repeating and felt the need to try other roles; in 1998, she told producers that she wished to leave the soap. As they enjoyed the character so much, they wrote her an especially high profile and entertaining final year.

== Storylines ==
Caroline was hired by Margot Warner (Glynis McNicoll) to care for her terminally ill husband Bruce (Ken Blackburn) as his private nurse. Following his death, Caroline got a job as a receptionist at the hospital to replace Marilyn Bluck. In early 1996 Caroline briefly dated David Kearney (Peter Elliott). She went on to have a short relationship with Ian (David Press) who quickly moved on to Jenny (Maggie Harper). After this, Caroline would get into a relationship with old acquaintance Dr Gary Travis (Stuart Turner). Later, after splitting up with Gary and with Gary leaving town, Caroline's friend Annabel Lustwick (Jodie Dorday) arrived and Caroline was shocked to learn Annabel was suicidal after being diagnosed with crippling multiple sclerosis. Annabel pleaded with Caroline to help her die and Caroline eventually assisted in her suicide. She was arrested and Lionel (John Leigh) supported her through the ordeal. In December Caroline was found guilty of murder and was sentenced to time in prison.

Kirsty Knight (Angela Dotchin) proved Caroline was innocent and she was released from prison. She returned to nursing and briefly dated Rangi (Blair Strang). Caroline dated Greg Feeney (Tim Balme) but broke up when she realized he was a drug dealer. She was fired after accusing Mackenzie (Ingrid Park) of attempting to murder Oscar (Christopher Brown). When she was proven right, Caroline was rehired. Caroline started to date Alan Dubrovsky (Malcolm Murray) and the two soon got engaged. However Caroline soon realized she was in love with bridesmaid Dr Laura Hall (Larissa Matheson) and dumped Al for Laura. The two dated for several months until Caroline fell back into the arms of Greg, who impregnated her and drove her off into the sunset.

== Character development ==
=== Lesbian storyline ===
The writers and producers of the show enjoyed the Caroline character and how they had transformed her from ditsy receptionist to heroine nurse, they then decided to try and mould the characters sexuality as part of the character's final year. The character was in a relationship with Al at the time with actress Tandi Wright explaining it was not love but security she was after; "She couldn't find the right man, so Caroline decided to settle for a good one - Dr Alan Dubrovsky." However Caroline soon found herself attracted to her bridesmaid, Laura Hall. She explained the attraction: "It became apparent to Caroline, slowly, that this woman was more important to her than any other relationship in her life ... They've been friends - it's a natural and deep love." Although Caroline was at a point where; "her biological clock is ticking and she wants love, marriage and children in that order", it soon became clear to Caroline she loved Laura not Al. Wright thought the storyline was handled sensitively and made sure that it did not enforce stereotypes; "It seems out of character but life often is," "I think the writers are extremely astute in terms of what's happening in the nation ... What I do like about Shortland Street is that they often rein in the characters and they appear to work hard not to make them a stereotype." Although the storyline was not the first to concern homosexuals, it was the one that had the "most depth required". However, as the character was departing, writers put in a final hurdle in the romance with Caroline succumbing to ex lover Greg and leaving the show, pregnant.

== Reception ==
Caroline was a popular character that audiences related to and were mostly sympathetic towards. Because of this, Wright thought her character was a good choice to play out the lesbian storyline. Simon Bennett who was a producer of the show, noted the euthanasia storyline as one of the most memorable storylines featured in the soap. In 2002, future producer, Steven Zanoski listed the lesbian storyline as one of the 10 best storylines to occur on the soap. Caroline and Greg have been described as one of Shortland Street's most memorable couples.
