= So You Wanna Be a Popstar? =

So You Wanna Be a Popstar? may refer to:

- So You Wanna Be a Popstar (Dutch TV series)
- So You Wanna Be a Popstar? (New Zealand TV series)
