= Lionel Skeggins =

- Shortland Street character
- Portrayed by: John Leigh
- Duration: 1993–99, 2017, 2022
- First appearance: 2 November 1993
- Last appearance: 25 May 2022
- Introduced by: Tony Holden (1993, 1994); Maxine Fleming (2017); Oliver Driver (2022)
- Book appearances: Kirsty and Lionel - Shortland Street Books (1996)
In-universe information
- Occupation: Veterinarian (until 1994); Owner of Strombelli cafe (1995–99)
- Father: Wilbur Skeggins
- Wife: Kirsty Knight (1995–98); Mackenzie Choat (1999)
- Sons: Luke Billingham
- Grandsons: Unnamed grandson

Lionel Skeggins is a fictional character on the New Zealand soap opera Shortland Street who was portrayed by John Leigh. His casting on the show began in late 1993 as a guest role and ended in early 1999 as a fan favourite regular. Lionel returned for a cameo in the show's 25th Anniversary in 2017 and again for the 30th anniversary in 2022.

== Creation and casting ==
John Leigh auditioned for the role in 1993 but was considered risky due to his relatively "old" age and lack of TV experience. Leigh recalls the casting director pondering why he had no television experience at 27 years old and concluding, "'He musn't be very good!'". However, after landing a 2-week recurring role, the character proved popular and was eventually brought back the following year as a core cast member. He ended up staying for 5 years. Leigh's final scene in 1999 saw Lionel washed off a rock by a large wave. He described his characters fate, "Murray Keane was directing, he said, 'you're in this shot and you're not in the next one' and there was a big woosh." Lionel made his final appearance on 12 March 1999. In 2012 producers considered bringing the character back in a brief cameo for the shows 20th anniversary but ultimately decided against it. Leigh reprised his role as Lionel for a cameo in the shows 25th anniversary in 2017, and the 30th anniversary in 2022.

== Storylines ==
Lionel arrived briefly in 1993 to attend best friend Leonard Dodds' (Marton Csokas) wedding and annoyed many by getting the groom extremely intoxicated the night before the wedding. He returned the following year when Leonard and wife Gina (Josephine Davison) gave him the hospital cafe's management contract despite his career as a vet. Proving a hit with the staff due to his muffin shop, Lionel immediately fell in love with receptionist Kirsty Knight (Angela Dotchin). Despite the mutual spark, Kirsty was attracted to Greg (Tim Balme) and Lionel moved on. However by the end of the year, Kirsty and Greg had broken up and she realised she too had fallen in love with Lionel and the two got engaged. Despite Kirsty's ex-boyfriend Stuart's (Martin Henderson) attempts to stop the marriage, the couple married in early 1995 on the deck of the Toroa. Lionel fell into a coma after he digested bad drugs from Darryl's (Mark Ferguson) company and following his recovery, his marriage with Kirsty tightened. The two bought their first home and Kirsty helped in the cafe but due to stress around renovations, the marriage quickly deteriorated and they separated. By the end of the year the marriage was over when Kirsty suffered amnesia from a head injury and returned to Greg.

Lionel goes missing after getting swept off a rock by a huge wave.

Lionel started to date Grace (Lynette Forday) but as 1996 ended he and Kirsty finally reconciled. The relationship was short-term and an attempted reconciliation with Grace also fell through. Whilst talking through a divorce with Kirsty on a small plane, the two narrowly escaped death when it crashed. Realising their luck, they decided to maintain their friendship but ended their marriage legally. Only months later, Lionel realised he would never stop loving Kirsty but missed her by seconds as she left Ferndale before he could profess his true feelings. He was shocked to discover he had an illegitimate teenage son - Luke Billingham (Greg Freeman) and he started to date Mackenzie (Ingrid Park). The two married in 1999 but shortly after the wedding, Lionel discovered evidence to suggest his wife had tried to murder Oscar (Christopher Brown) for money and whilst trying to escape her, was washed off a rock. His body was never recovered and he was presumed dead, however his wallet was found.

In 2017 Chris Warner (Michael Galvin) discovered Lionel in the hospital helping out following the volcanic eruption. Although confronted, Lionel appeared to be suffering from amnesia. 5 years later Chris recognised Lionel from afar as the marriage celebrant of Damo Johnson's (Grant Lobban) and Desdemona Schmidt's (Kura Forrester) wedding.

== Character development ==
=== Characterisation ===
Whilst at first appearing as an immature prankster, Lionel's second stint saw the character develop into a more sensitive character with "little-boy-lost" vulnerability. John Leigh described Lionel as likeable, stating; "Lionel is this great trier. That's why people have latched on to him. He doesn't have all the swankiness of the doctors – their money and their looks. A lot of people always see themselves as falling a bit short of the mark and everyone does in some way. People identity with this struggle." Leigh found it difficult to understand how Lionel attracted women, saying, "Lionel is the sort of person you want to meet when you're ready to settle down. He's a nice guy. You can trust him. He can cook. He can fix things. None of these things is exciting to a young woman."

=== Kirsty and Lionel ===
Upon returning in 1994, Lionel was paired with popular character Kirsty Knight (Angela Dotchin). Several people involved in production were skeptical that the "Beauty and the Beast" storyline could actually work, finding it unlikely the glamorous Kirsty would be attracted to the clumsy Lionel. However the unusual pairing was a hit with audiences, becoming part of the classic soap opera archetype of; the couple the audience know should be together even when the characters do not know it themselves. The couple were so successful a novel was released telling the two's story titled "Kirsty and Lionel - Shortland Street Books". The characters first began to share scenes when Kirsty was involved in a car crash that saw the deaths of TP Aleni (Elizabeth Skeen) and Steve Mills (Andrew Binns). Kirsty used Lionel as a shoulder to cry on and though Lionel was instantly smitten, Kirsty was not. Dotchin explained, "He's somebody who really looks after her, but it's not a blossoming romance. Lionel's not Kirsty's type, she doesn't see them together as a couple sexually. He's very much in love with her, but she's not in love with him." Nonetheless, several months later the two featured in one of the most iconic moments in the soap's history when the first ever cliffhanger featured on the soap centered around the wedding between the two being interrupted by Kirsty's past lover Stuart Neilson (Martin Henderson). The two got through the hiccup but after Kirsty was hit by a truck in another of the soap's iconic storylines, leaving her with amnesia, she forgot ever loving Lionel and returned to ex-boyfriend Greg (Tim Balme). However the two reconciled and the 1996 season ended on their kiss. The two's reconciliation did not last long and the two were amidst divorcing when the plane they were in crashed in the 1997 cliffhanger. However, in 1998 Lionel finally decided he wanted to be with Kirsty, only to miss her by seconds when she left to live in Wellington. The popularity of Lionel and Kirsty's relationship is reflected in the fact that four consecutive Christmas cliffhangers in the show focus largely on them- the 1994 cliffhanger of their wedding being interrupted, the 1995 cliffhanger of Kirsty nearly dying in the clinic truck crash, the 1996 cliffhanger of their reconciliation and the 1997 cliffhanger of their plane crashing.

=== Luke Billingham ===
In 1998 Lionel was shocked to discover he had fathered a son, 16-year-old Luke Billingham (Greg Freeman) when he himself was 16. Luke debuted as a "shy, inarticulate country boy with an adventurous spirit" who shockingly revealed to Lionel that he was his son. Though Lionel was in shock, he took Luke in, Leigh stated, "Lionel’s struggling to get through it as fatherhood is thrust upon him. He just inherited a 16-year-old son unlike most people who get to watch their kids from a baby and slowly get used to them." The storyline proved to be hugely topical, with the amount of single parent families in the 1990s was at an all-time high. Luke instantly got into trouble in his new home, he was involved in a robbery at Lionel's bar, drove Lionel's car without a driver's license and stole a credit card to access online pornography. Despite this, Leigh insisted Lionel was the best possible father, "Lionel’s the best father. He talks through the troubles." After initially struggling to connect with Luke, when he was involved in a dramatic bus crash Lionel realised how much he loved his son and even went to the extent of cooking him gourmet school lunches. After only knowing each other a year, the father-son partnership was broken after Lionel died in scenes that Freeman described as, "draining". Luke soon became a father with his teenage bride, Josie Bergman (Karamia Muller) at age 16, similarly to his father Lionel.

== Reception ==
The character is remembered as hugely iconic and a fan favourite. He was named as one of the show's most successful comedic characters. Lionel was so well known, John Leigh was more recognized by some members of the public than Michael J. Fox. Leigh found the situation interesting, stating; "I've got people recognizing me as Lionel who wouldn't have even been born when I was on Shortland Street." The relationship between Lionel and Mackenzie Choat was noted as odd by one reviewer who believed Lionel was too good for her. Lionel was voted as the 4th best character on the show in a 2002 article. with the reason given; "he was such a cuddly old romantic. Because as a cupcake, he was as sexy as a bran muffin." In 2012, the character was named as one of the standout characters of the show's first 20 years. In 2017 New Zealand Herald columnist Ricardo Simich expressed his desire for Lionel to return for the soap opera's 25th anniversary. That same year stuff.co.nz journalist Fleur Mealing named Lionel as the 2nd character she most wanted to return for the show's 25th anniversary, citing her desire to determine whether he survived his apparent-death and for a chance to reunite with Kirsty.

The storyline that saw Lionel's marriage to Kirsty being uplifted by Stuart Neilson has been named as an iconic episode. Rachel Lang listed Lionel and Kirsty's romance as one of her favourite storylines. Lionel's final scene has been hailed as iconic with the question constantly lingering among the show's fans, actors and even John Leigh himself, what truly happened to Lionel and if he will return. A 1995 episode saw Lionel come close to death after contracting tetanus and as a result, New Zealanders receiving tetanus shots that month more than doubled. The period surrounding Lionel's exit from the show, remains the highest rating episodes in the show's first 25 years.

Lionel's return in 2017 was said to "surprise" fans.
