= Moira Crombie =

- Shortland Street character
- Portrayed by: Geraldine Brophy
- Duration: 1997–2001
- First appearance: 30 May 1997; Episode 1265
- Last appearance: 19 April 2001
- Introduced by: Simon Bennett
In-universe information
- Occupation: Bed and Breakfast motel manager Receptionist
- Husband: Earl Crombie (1978–1999); Dean Cochrane (2000–)
- Sons: Jordan Crombie; Blake Crombie; Maddy Crombie
- Daughters: Shelley Crombie
- Stepdaughters: Erin Kingston
- Nephews: Eamon Dempsey

Moira Dawn Cochrane (also Lafferty, previously Crombie) is a fictional character on the New Zealand soap opera Shortland Street who first appeared in 1997, portrayed by Geraldine Brophy. The character was axed in 2001 as part of a large cast cull and show revamp.

Moira was the matriarch of the Crombie family unit, a working-class family consisting of husband Earl (Murray Keane), sons - Jordan (Cameron Smith), Blake (Jesse Peach) and Maddy (Joseph Greer) and daughter - Shelley (Natalie Dennis). The family often struggled to meet ends meet and ex convict - Moira was the receptionist at Shortland Street for 4 years. Moira's marriage to Earl was often strained and he was rarely home. Following his death from a drink driving accident, Moria ended up marrying past lover and criminal associate - Dean (Greg Johnson), with he and his daughter Erin Kingston (Emma Lahana) joining the family. Another member of the family unit arrived in 2000 in the shape of rapist - Eamon Dempsey (Neill Rea) who nearly put an end to her family once and for all. Moira ended up leaving to run a bed and breakfast with her new husband in early 2001.

Moira was a hugely popular character, singled out by numerous reviewers as a favourite character. Brophy was also acclaimed for her portrayal, receiving a nomination for Best Actress in the 2000 New Zealand Film and Television Awards.

== Creation and casting ==
When offered, Brophy found it hard not to accept the role of Moira, a character she saw as the "everyday New Zealander". She explained the reason stating; "Because we're not very interested in Moiras. Our society's not interested in women who have ordinary jobs and support their families, and so I believe she is very important to be seen." In 2000 Moira was axed from the show alongside 10 other characters. The cause was later revealed as a show revamp which would see the tone more suited towards working class characters.

== Storylines ==
Moira arrived to the hospital in with her daughter Shelley (Natalie Dennis) and son Maddy (Joseph Greer). She got a job as a receptionist but quickly it came out that Moira had served time in prison for armed robbery. Moira's husband Earl (Murray Keane) arrived to town. however so too did Moira's ex-boyfriend Dean Cochrane (Greg Johnson) who it turned out was the man who landed Moira prison time, blaming her for the crime. Earl ended up getting a job overseas and Dean turned over a new leaf by shouting the Crombie's to visit him as the year ended. Maddy was diagnosed with leukaemia and the oldest Crombie child, Jordan (Cameron Smith) offered to be a bone marrow donor but Moira was shocked to discover he was gay and could possibly infect Maddy with HIV, however she eventually accepted her son's sexuality and Maddy soon was healed. Moira proved to be a good friend to many of the clinic's staff including Caroline Buxton whom she supported after she was falsely imprisoned on a manslaughter charge and Ellen Crozier whilst she endured a separation from husband David.

Moira's other son Blake (Jesse Peach) soon arrived and Moira and Earl's relationship was on the rocks when a fast food shop he bought with no insurance was vandalized. Earl ended up dying in a drink driving accident and Moira ended up falling in love with Dean again, the two got together as they entered the new millennium. Moira and Dean got married and Moira's nephew Eamon Dempsey (Neill Rea) came to stay. Moira refused to believe Eamon had raped Kate Larsen (Rebecca Hobbs) and her disbelief caused her marriage with Dean to come to an end. Eamon died after an altercation with Kate and Moira finally realised the truth and apologized to Kate whilst reconciling with Dean.

More trouble came Moira's way in early 2001 with the arrival of the Heywood family. Moira had already clashed with new doctor Adam Heywood after she accidentally misplaced some of his files whilst cleaning his office and the feud between the Crombies and the Heywoods was exacerbated further after Blake befriended Adam's younger brother Marshall whom, unbeknownst to the family, was secretly filming them and streaming the footage on the internet. After Chris Warner's return, the clinic became a public hospital and Moira had the opportunity to apply for a new position as PA to the new CEO. Moira and Barb Heywood both applied for the position, but Moira lost out and was offered a conciliatory job as an admissions clerk. Around the same time, Dean was offered a job as the head of a hotel on the Gold Coast. After supporting good friend Donna with the loss of husband Rangi, Moira realised the time was right to move on and the entire family left by April 2001.

== Reception ==
The character was highly praised throughout her run, being labelled a; "marvellously histrionic matriarch" by one reviewer. Her relationship with Dean was also praised, with reviewers believing it was important that middle aged characters were shown receiving romance. The 1999 storyline which saw Moira's son - Jordan come out as gay at the same time as needing to donate bone marrow to his dying brother, was seen as contemporary. Upon hearing of Moira's axing from the show, fans wished for the character to leave with husband - Dean, in a sufficiently "happily-ever-after" scenario. For her portrayal of Moira, Brophy landed a nomination for "Best Actress" in the 2000 New Zealand Film and Television Awards. Broadcaster - Kim Hill was outraged at Moira's axing and confronted producer - Simon Bennett on air. She believed there should be more characters aged over 40. In 2012, the character was named as one of the standout characters of the show's first 20 years.
