= Brian Sergent =

New Zealand actor

Brian Sergent (born 29 December 1959) is a comedian, writer and actor born and based in Wellington, New Zealand.

== Background ==
Sergent's acting career began at age 15 playing Lionel in the soap opera, Close to Home.

In television Sergent is known for playing Eric Grady on Outrageous Fortune, the New Zealand Prime Minister on Flight of the Conchords, and Harold in The Lost Children. One of his most popular characters, cabin steward Gavin Soper, appeared on the Pulp Comedy television series.

Sergent has a strong association with Circa Theatre in Wellington. He performed in The Duchess of Malfi (1982), Travels with My Aunt (1997) Closer and Take a Chance on Me (2001).

Sergent's film credits include Peter Jackson's Meet the Feebles, Braindead and Lord of the Rings, Absent Without Leave, Via Satellite, the lead role as Marty in The Shirt and Jonah in Eagle vs. Shark. Also, Slow West, with Michael Fassbender, Ben Mendelson and Kodi Scot-MCfee.

Sergent participates in reading of short stories, novels and radio plays on Radio New Zealand where he is still actively involved.

Sergent has won multiple Chapman Tripp Theatre Awards for acting and writing. In 1992 he won Male Actor of the Year for his performances as Lenny in The Homecoming at the Circa Theatre and Alfredo Traps in A Dangerous Game at the BATS Theatre. In 1994, he won Best Male Actor in a Supporting Role for his performance of Gary Peter Lefkowitz in I Hate Hamlet at the Circa. In 2004, Prior to the opening of his first play, the New Zealand Listener described Sergent as ''New Zealand's greatest comic actor'' He won the award for Outstanding New Playwright of the Year for his play The Love of Humankind. In 2008 Radio New Zealand broadcast for the first of many times, Sergent's first radio play, ''Madness You Can Trust.''

After taking a break from the show for nearly three years, Sergent returned to Outrageous Fortune as Eric in the second to last episode of the fifth season.

Sergent has been a stand-up Comedian and sketch writer since his debut in 1979.

== Filmography ==
=== Film ===
Film	Year	Role	Notes
It's Your Child Norman Allenby	1979	Psycho Boyfriend	International year of the Child. T.V.NZ.
The Person Next Door	1981	Passerby	Gaylene Preston's first film.
Carry Me Back	1982	Andy	
Footrot Flats: The Dog's Tale	1987	Spit Murphy (voice)	
Meet the Feebles	1989	Wynyard the Frog / Trevor the Rat / F.W. Fly / Jim the Frog / Chuck the Frog / The Spider / Vietnamese Gophers (voice)	
Braindead	1992	Vet	Film called Dead Alive in North America
Absent Without Leave	1992	Dick	
Chicken	1996	Newsagent	
Via Satellite	1998	Brian	
The Shirt	2000	Marty	Short film
The Lord of the Rings: The Fellowship of the Ring	2001	Ted Sandyman	Extended edition
The Lord of the Rings: The Return of the King	2008	Additional character voices	
Eagle vs Shark	2007	Jonah	
John Quincy Adams		Adams	Short film
Moon over Mercedes			Short film
The Killers	2008	Killer one	Student film
Blessed	2002		
Tuffy	2012	Father	Short film
The Hobbit: The Desolation of Smaug	2013	Mirkwood Spider (voice)	
Slow West	2015	Peyote Joe	

=== Television ===
Title	Year	Role	Notes
Lynn of Tawa	1980	University Student / Policeman	Television comedy special
Rock Around the Clock	1981	Bodgie Groper	Six episodes
Lynn of Tawa Show	1982	Jock Strapp	First episode
Pioneer Women	1983	Eddie	Episode: "Ettie Rout"
Cuckoo Land	1986	Utmoor / Merv	Episodes: "The Neighbour", "Bookkeeping"
Worzel Gummidge Down Under	1987–1989	Dagnation Take It / Terence	2 episodes
Public Eye	1988–1989	Various roles	
The Ray Bradbury Theater	1990–1992	Larson / Boltz	2 episodes
Married	1992	Roy	Television film
Skitz	1993	Various roles	
Lynn of Tawa - In Search of the Great New Zealand Male	1994	Himself	Television comedy special
Pulp Comedy	1995–2003	Various roles	
Telly Laughs	1996	Various roles	
The Semisis	1996	Gary Belton	Episode: "1.1"
The Person Next Door	1997	Presenter	Mental health awareness film
Mirror, Mirror II	1998	Henry	Episode: "Elephant Boy"
The Legend of William Tell	1998	Zark	Episode: "The Spirit of Kale"
The Adventures of Swiss Family Robinson	1998	Sidney Thomas	3 episodes
The Dark Knight	2000–2001	Card Gambler #1 / Phillipe de Mere	2 episodes
Shortland Street	2001	Rich Fortune	1 episode
Atlantis High	2001–2002	Mr. Quentin / Q	Recurring role; 10 episodes
Revelations: The Initial Journey	2002	Lysias	Episode: "And Judas Had a Brother"
Oscar & Friends	2002	Dog / Opossum	Episode: "Oscar Takes Off"
The Strip	2002–2003	Ian "Dogwood" Douglas	6 episodes
The Tribe	2003	Dad	Episode: "5.33"
The Insiders Guide to Happiness	2004	Father of the Bride	Episode: "Is Happiness an Accident?"
From Len Lye to Gollum: New Zealand Animators	2004	Mr. Pencil / Narrator	Television documentary
Outrageous Fortune	2005–2010	Eric Grady	Recurring role; 42 episodes
The Lost Children	2006	Harold	Main role; 12 episodes
Flight of the Conchords	2009	Brian, Prime Minister of New Zealand	2 episodes

=== Theatre ===
Year	Title	Role	Venue	Notes
1979	How the Other Half Loves	William Featherstone	Four Seasons Theatre	First Stand-Up gig Upper Hutt
1980	The Lion in Winter	John	Fortune Theatre	
1981	Gimme Shelter	Chris, Teacher	BATS	
1983	Crimes of the Heart	Barnette Lloyd	Circa Theatre	
1983	The Hangman	Prisoner Hurst	New Depot	
1983	Hot Water	Clive Palmer	Downstage Theatre	
1984	Election Revue	Various	Circa Theatre	
1985	Charley's Aunt	Lord Fancourt Babberley	Downstage	
1986	Unsuitable For Adults	Nick	Downstage	
1987	The Happy Witch	Darfus	Circa Theatre	
1988	Legal Revue	Various	Circa Theatre	
1989	Ladies' Night	Gavin	James Cabaret	
1990	Weed	Hugh Riorden	Circa	
1990	Elizabeth: Almost by Chance a Woman	Dame Grosslady	BATS Theatre	
1992	The Homecoming	Lenny	Circa	Won Chapman Tripp Award for Male Actor of the Year
1992	A Dangerous Game	Alfredo Traps	BATS	Won Chapman Tripp Award for Male Actor of the Year
1993	Arsenic and Old Lace	Dr. Herman Einstein	Downstage	
1993	Summer of the Seventeenth Doll	Barney Ibbot	Downstage	
1993	Ladies' Night 2: Raging On	Gavin	Downstage	
1994	I Hate Hamlet	Gary Peter Lefkowitz	Circa	Won Chapman Tripp Award for Male Actor in a Supporting Role
1995	Moonlight	Jake	Circa	
1996	Market Forces	Nick	Circa	
1996	Uncle Vanya	Telegin	Herald Theatre	
1997	Travels with My Aunt		Circa	
1997	Lady Windermere's Fan		Circa	
1997	Four Cities	Wojtek Milosz	Circa	
1998	The Big Picture	Guy	Circa	
1998	Closer	Larry	Circa	
1999	This Train I'm On	Billy	Circa	
1999	Shear Madness		No. 5 Cable St. Theatre place	
2000	Speaking in Tongues	Multiple roles	Circa	
2001	The Country Wife	Sparkish/Quack	Circa	
2001	Othello	Iago	Court Theatre	
2001	Take a Chance on Me	Eric	Circa	
2002	Shake The Bard	Petruchio, Macbeth, various	Tour	
2002	Meltdown	Jim Harrison	Circa	
2004	The Love of Humankind	Playwright / Rodney Pump	Circa	Won Chapman Tripp Award for Outstanding New Playwright of the Year
2005	A Midsummer Night's Dream	Hippolyta	Circa	
2006	Dinner	Mike	Circa	
2008	Mr. Paradise	Mr. Paradise	Salem State Theatre	
	The Tempest	Prospero	Salem State Theatre	
2009	Five Short Plays of Harold Pinter	Prisoner / Lover / Doctor / Dispatcher	Five Points Theatre Boston	
2010	Boxed In	Frank	Firehouse theatre	Massachusetts
	Heidi	Grandfather	Newburyport theatre	
2012	The Truth Game	Rafe	Circa Theatre	
2012	Zombie Appocalypse	Stranger	Christmas flood aftermath play, touring	
2014	Revue	Sir Robert Muldoon	BATS	
