= Nothing Trivial =

New Zealand comedy-drama TV show

- Genre: Comedy drama
- Created by: Rachel Lang; Gavin Strawhan
- Starring: Shane Cortese; Tandi Wright; Blair Strang; Nicole Whippy; Debbie Newby-Ward
- Opening theme: "The Stars Came Out Once the Lights Went Out" by The Veils
- Composers: Wayne Bell; Callie Blood
- Country of origin: New Zealand
- Original language: English
- No. of series: 3
- No. of episodes: 39

Production
- Executive producers: Rachel Lang; Gavin Strawhan; John Barnett; Chris Bailey; Kelly Martin
- Producers: Chris Bailey; Britta Hawkins
- Cinematography: Dave Cameron; Rewa Harre; Kevin Riley; David Paul; Dave Garbett
- Editors: Paul Maxwell; Allanah Milne; Jochen Fitzherbert; Paul Sutorius
- Running time: 42 minutes
- Production company: South Pacific Pictures

Original release
- Network: TV One
- Release: 20 July 2011 – 3 August 2014

Nothing Trivial is a New Zealand comedy-drama television series, produced by South Pacific Pictures. The series is created by the duo of Gavin Strawhan and the co-creator of Outrageous Fortune, Rachel Lang. The pair, who also created the shows Go Girls and This Is Not My Life, both write and executive produce the show.

The series is set around five characters who meet at a pub quiz. All share the characteristic of being unlucky in love.

The series began airing on TV One in July 2011 and the first episode had the highest number of viewers of any locally made drama debut since 2000.

== Cast ==
Cortese said that the cast were already friends before filming started.

=== Primary ===
- Shane Cortese plays Mac Delany; an advertising guy with a heart of gold who specializes in general knowledge.
- Tandi Wright plays Catherine Duvall; an attractive, intelligent and acerbic doctor who specializes in medicine, science, and anything about France.
- Blair Strang plays Brian King; a plumber and serial womanizer who specializes in sports, eighties music and geography.
- Nicole Whippy plays Michelle Hardcastle; a franchise owner and vengeful recently divorced wife who specializes in celebrity gossip.
- Debbie Newby-Ward plays Emma Wedgewood; a teacher and eternal optimist who does good sympathy and specializes in food and animals.

=== Secondary ===
- Will Hall plays Cory; The antagonistic leader of the opposition pub team
- Katherine Kennard plays Jo Delany; Mac's vindictive ex-wife and mother of his children
- Barnie Duncan plays Scotty; Michelle's philandering ex-husband
- Aaron Ward as the Quiz Master; The man who runs the quiz
- Manon Blackman plays Celeste Duvall; Catherine's teenage daughter
- Elizabeth Hawthorne plays Anne; Catherine's mother
- Tim Balme plays Jules; Celeste's father
- Simon Mead plays Noah Delany; Mac & Jo's elder son
- Dylan Holmes plays Frank Delany; Mac & Jo's younger son
- Jason Hoyte plays Smudge; Mac's business partner, real name Malcolm.
- Mark Mitchinson plays David Manning. Michelle's therapist in season 3.

== Production ==
In November 2010 it was confirmed that the creators of Go Girls had created a new show and it may be airing on TV One. In December 2010 funding was approved for the show and NZ on Air representatives were said to be excited. 6.9 million was given to the show for a 13 episode run. In March 2011 it was confirmed the show will air later in the year and was described as; "a light-hearted and comedic drama based around five friends with two things in common: a pub quiz and the fact that each of them is unlucky or unhappy in love." Blair Strang, Shane Cortese, Tandi Wright, Nicole Whippy and Debbie Newby-Ward were announced to be in the cast. The show made its debut in July 2011. On 10 October 2011 it was announced that funding had been given for a second season. On 13 March 2014, New Zealand on Air confirmed that they will help fund a two-hour telemovie to give fans closure.

== Reception ==
The show was met with commercial and critical acclaim. The show gained the record of the highest number of viewers of any locally made drama debut since 2000. Deborah Hill Cone from the New Zealand Herald stated; "The writing on Nothing Trivial is good enough to have been penned by the guru of romantic comedy, Richard Curtis (Four Weddings and A Funeral, Bridget Jones's Diary). The characters in Nothing Trivial really come alive from the first episode. They seem like people you could know but, of course, wittier... It is a treat." While Simon Wilson agreed with the well structured writing, saying; "(The writing) is witty, it's sharp, it's very tightly put together. The people are walking clusters of mistakes and they are trying to come to terms with that and deal with that. The series will become a celebration of friendship and where friendships might lead. If you do that well, it makes charming television and they are so far doing it well." Melanie Parkes of Yahoo also stated; ""The humour is uniquely and distinctly Kiwi... You don't have to be interested in competitive quizzing to enjoy Nothing Trivial, although if you're a regular pub quizzer yourself, you'll certainly find something pleasantly familiar about it."

It was reported in August 2011 that pub quizzes were receiving a huge surge in popularity due to the success of Nothing Trivial.

== List of episodes ==
=== Season 1: 2011 ===
No. overall	No. in season	Title	Directed by	Written by	Original release date	NZ viewers (thousands)
1	1	"Who Was the lady love of John Wayne Bobbitt?"	Mark Beesley	Rachel Lang & Gavin Strawhan	20 July 2011	516.3
Quiz night is all about questions: like - can Mac save his marriage? Why does Brian hate Michelle? And can losers in love ever become winners?
2	2	"What Colour is a Bichon Frise?"	Mark Beesley	Rachel Lang	27 July 2011	451.4
It’s game on: as Michelle goes into battle with her ex for what she loves most; Mac takes on his nemesis; and Emma breaks her losing streak.
3	3	"Who Performed the 1987 hit song 'Time of My Life'?"	Murray Keane	Gavin Strawhan	3 August 2011	405.0
Brian has the chance to recapture his past and the girl of his dreams, and Mac goes head to head with family, career - and Quiz Team Rankin.
4	4	"What is a Petard?"	Murray Keane	Kate McDermott	10 August 2011	327.8
A new team member sets cat among pigeons for Catherine and Mac. And Emma’s latest romance is a loaded gun when it comes to Brian...
5	5	"Who wrote The Art of War?"	Mark Beesley	Nick Ward & Rachel Lang	17 August 2011	391.8
New sexy adversaries lead Brian into dangerous liaisons. As Michelle finds war can have its upside...
6	6	"Which street in LA is known as Bad Boy Drive?"	Mark Beesley	Rachel Lang	24 August 2011	342.4
Mac fears for Catherine’s mum when an old reprobate hits town. Brian wants to get rid of an interloper – but is it too late to save Emma?
7	7	"What is the expression 'Seize the Day' in Latin?"	John Laing	Gavin Strawhan	31 August 2011	364.4
A family crisis for Catherine and Mac leads to big revelations and a big opportunity. But what are Brian and Emma up to back in town...?
8	8	"What is a Pyrrhic Victory?"	John Laing	Rachel Lang	7 September 2011	346.6
Michelle is on top of her game - or on a crash course to disaster? As Emma forces Brian to face his demons...
9	9	"Who said "I'm extraordinarily patient provided I get my own way in the end"?"	John Laing	Kate McDermott & Rachel Lang	14 September 2011	342.3
Bolts from the blue hit Catherine and Mac and lead to relationship crunch time. As Brian’s determination to win at all costs has Emma worried.
10	10	"Who said "Risk, Risk Everything"?"	Peter Salmon	Gavin Strawhan	21 September 2011	344.7
Mac gets an offer from a younger woman, and Michelle is determined to save Emma from Brian.
11	11	"Who had the hit single "Look Back in Anger" in 1996?"	Peter Salmon	Kate McDermott & Rachel Lang	28 September 2011	315.2
Michelle’s dangerous behaviour leads her to a crisis. Brian plays match maker for Emma – but is Craig really Mr Perfect?
12	12	"Who said "A happy family is but an earlier heaven"?"	Murray Keane	Gavin Strawhan	5 October 2011	N/A
The team is in crisis – as Brian is the root of all evil; Michelle and Emma are boycotting; and Mac and Catherine make big romantic discoveries.
13	13	""All the news that's fit to print" is the motto of which newspaper?"	Murray Keane	Rachel Lang	12 October 2011	412.1
Emma’s big news is a wake up call for Brian, and when tragedy strikes Mac, the team have big reasons to pull together.

=== Season 2: 2012 ===
No. overall	No. in season	Title	Directed by	Written by	Original release date	NZ viewers (thousands)
14	1	"Leopards changing their spots is in which book of the Bible?"	Murray Keane	Rachel Lang	26 August 2012	331.5
Sex On A Stick prepare for the finals, as Mac battles a cunning foe, and Brian’s virtue is tested...
15	2	"Who was mad, bad & dangerous to know?"	Murray Keane	Gavin Strawhan	2 September 2012	N/A
Brian and Emma face the attack of the parents, and Michelle finds her evil nemesis needs her help.
16	3	"How did the Emperor Tamarin get its name?"	Murray Keane	Fiona Samuel	9 September 2012	348.1
Catherine and Mac face parent traps, as Catherine fears for Celeste, and Mac goes to war with Jo over custody.
17	4	"Who is the Patron Saint of Motherhood?"	Peter Salmon	Nick Ward & Rachel Lang	16 September 2012	452.5
Mac and Michelle vow to break their sex drought, as Brian and Emma have big baby trouble.
18	5	"Casanova was a famous lover. But which state did he spy for?"	Peter Salmon	Rachel Lang	23 September 2012	377.5
Michelle and Brian undertake a vital mission to save the Quiz Master, as Catherine and Mac wrangle warring parents and dangerous liaisons.
19	6	"According to Shakespeare, who was the noblest Roman?"	Katherine McRae	Gavin Strawhan	30 September 2012	369.3
Brian gets disturbing news and finds Emma has secrets, as Mac sees a way to shaft the competition.
20	7	"Who Said "The Only Thing I'm Addicted to Right Now is Winning"?"	Katherine McRae	Kate McDermott	7 October 2012	411.2
Emma fights for the right to be a winner, as Michelle does battle with nauseating couples.
21	8	"Suspicious Minds Was First Recorded in What Year?"	Murray Keane	Gavin Strawhan	14 October 2012	384.1
Mac finds that he’s being followed, but who is after him and why? And Catherine begins an illicit relationship with the team’s worst enemy...
22	9	"Sea Horses Mate For Life, True or False?"	Murray Keane	Kate McDermott	21 October 2012	375.6
Emma finds her father may be seeing another woman, as Brian faces fatherhood, and Michelle tries to get a deal on no-strings sex.
23	10	"Who Had an Epiphany on the Road to Damascus?"	Josh Frizzell	Rachel Lang	28 October 2012	343.9
Mac’s crisis leads to marriage meltdown, as Catherine faces a bombshell. And the new team on the block are a force to be reckoned with.
24	11	"Which Philosopher said Have No Friends Not Equal To Yourself?"	Josh Frizzell	Nick Ward & Gavin Strawhan	4 November 2012	396.5
Michelle fears that Richard is too good to be true, as Emma’s new ally turns out to be more than he seems...
25	12	"Which Animal Has The Largest Penis To Body Size Ratio"	Murray Keane	Gavin Strawhan	11 November 2012	435.5
Catherine runs into some big obstacles, as Mac and Nige battle for Brian’s soul. But can Brian resist temptation?
26	13	"The Final Countdown Was a Hit For Which Swedish Band?"	Murray Keane	Rachel Lang	18 November 2012	440.9
Sex On A Stick go to war with their new nemesis - but find they could lose something much more important than pub quiz.

=== Season 3: 2013 ===
No. overall	No. in season	Title	Directed by	Written by	Original release date	NZ viewers (thousands)
27	1	"In Kramer Vs. Kramer, Who Played The Divorcing Couple?"	Murray Keane	Rachel Lang & Gavin Strawhan	11 September 2013	238.5
Mac plays hero, as Brian plays the field. Emma has a new partner, and Michelle a mystery man. But is the answer to everything - Hamilton?
28	2	"Carrots Improve Your Eyesight - True Or False?"	Murray Keane	Fiona Samuel	18 September 2013	N/A
Catherine keeps a secret from Mac, as Michelle hides a liaison with an old flame. But is she playing with fire?
29	3	"Who said "...As Long As You Know Men Are Like Children, You Know Everything..."?"	Mike Smith	Gavin Strawhan	25 September 2013	N/A
Michelle battles an enemy, as Brian goes out on a limb to save what he loves most...
30	4	"Around 100 New Zealanders Do What Every Day?"	Mike Smith	Nick Ward & Gavin Strawhan	2 October 2013	N/A
Brian is accused of the worst of crimes, as Mac asks Catherine to overlook her principles and make the biggest leap.
31	5	"Which Disney Princess Sings "A Dream Is A Wish Your Heart Makes"?"	John Laing	Kate McDermott	9 October 2013	N/A
Emma's family bonding reveals shocking home truths, Mac gets an admirer, and Catherine's plans come unstuck.
32	6	"'She can ruin your faith with her casual lies' is from which song?"	John Laing	Fiona Samuel & Rachel Lang	16 October 2013	N/A
Michelle's indiscretion has far reaching consequences, as Brian rides to the rescue. But will the truth threaten his chances?
33	7	"What is hyperbole?"	John Laing	Rachel Lang	23 October 2013	N/A
Jo’s needs drive a wedge between Mac and Catherine, as Michelle finds a champion in her battle against the enemy.
34	8	"Which male animal pretends there's a lion around to keep the ladies interested?"	Mike Smith	Gavin Strawhan	30 October 2013	175.4
Brian fights to save Sonny Bill, as Emma meets an old nemesis. And quiz night intrigue sets Michelle and Catherine on opposing teams.
35	9	"In Maori mythology, who are the sky father and earth mother?"	Mike Smith	Kate McDermott	6 November 2013	259.1
Catherine fears for Celeste as Mac faces off against a bigger threat. And will a meddling mother kill Michelle's romantic chances?
36	10	"What is the meaning of 'primum non nocere'?"	Murray Keane	Rachel Lang	13 November 2013	215.6
Michelle wants to avenge murder most foul, as Brian faces temptation.
37	11	"What is the answer to life, the universe and everything?"	Murray Keane	Kate McDermott	20 November 2013	N/A
Catherine abandons Mac on his birthday, as Brian finds Emma has a sex secret. And the surprise party holds bombshell surprises.
38	12	"In Happy Days, the Fonz dated which set of sisters?"	Mark Beesley	Fiona Samuel & Rachel Lang	27 November 2013	279.4
Will Mac tell the truth? Can Brian handle the truth? And Emma gets a result she didn't expect.
39	13	"Will you, Brian, take Emma to be your wife?"	Mark Beesley	Gavin Strawhan & Rachel Lang	4 December 2013	249.5
Mac faces up to his crimes, as Brian faces the hardest question of all. But a shocking end will change everything for Team Sex on a Stick.

=== Telemovie: 2014 ===
Title	Directed by	Written by	Original release date	NZ viewers (thousands)
"Nothing Trivial - The Finale"	Murray Keane	Rachel Lang & Gavin Strawhan	3 August 2014	N/A
Catherine is in Hospital with head injuries
