= Burying Brian =

- Created by: Maxine Fleming; Gavin Strawhan
- Written by: Gavin Strawhan
- Directed by: Peter Burger; Chris Bailey
- Starring: Jodie Dorday; Rebecca Hobbs; Carrie McLaughlin; Ingrid Park; Craig Hall; Shane Cortese
- Opening theme: "Sleeping During the Day" by The Mint Chicks
- Ending theme: "Sleeping During the Day" by The Mint Chicks
- Composers: Callie Blood; Wayne Bell
- Country of origin: New Zealand
- Original language: English
- No. of episodes: 6

Production
- Producer: Julie Christie
- Cinematography: Wayne Vinten
- Editors: Gary Hunt; David Ross
- Production company: Eyeworks Touchdown

Original release
- Network: TV One
- Release: 2 July – 6 August 2008

Burying Brian is a New Zealand television miniseries produced by Eyeworks Touchdown which premiered on Television New Zealand's TV One on 2 July 2008, and ran for 6 episodes. The series is about Jodie and her three female friends. At the beginning of the first episode, Jodie's husband Brian dies during a domestic dispute. Jodie believes that she may go to jail for his murder, but her friends convince her not to report the death, but instead to bury the body and make it appear that he has run off with another woman.

Although the series was a ratings success, no further episodes were made after the first season.

== Cast and characters ==
- Jodie Dorday as Jodie Welch
- Rebecca Hobbs as Gerri Marchand
- Carrie McLaughlin as Theresa Donnelly
- Ingrid Park as Denise Crowley
- Craig Hall as Pete Donnelly
- Shane Cortese as Brian Welch
- Josh Leys as Josh Welch
- Ruby Love as Kendall Welch
- Scott Wills – Warren Crowley
- Hannah Marshall – Kimberley

== Episodes ==
No.	Title	Directed by	Written by	Original release date
1	"Episode One"	Peter Burger	Gavin Strawhan	2 July 2008
2	"Episode Two"	Peter Burger	Gavin Strawhan	9 July 2008
3	"Episode Three"	Peter Burger	Gavin Strawhan	16 July 2008
4	"Episode Four"	Chris Bailey	Gavin Strawhan	23 July 2008
5	"Episode Five"	Chris Bailey	Gavin Strawhan	30 July 2008
6	"Episode Six"	Chris Bailey	Gavin Strawhan	6 August 2008
