= Nicole Whippy =

New Zealand actress

- Born: Nicole Celeste Whippy; 1977 or 1978 (age 48–49); Suva, Fiji
- Occupations: Actress, Director, Screenwriter
- Years active: 1999–present
- Spouse: Tom Holden
- Children: 2

Nicole Whippy (born 1977 or 1978) is a Fijian born New Zealand actress and director, best known for her role as Kasey Mason in the hit comedy-drama Outrageous Fortune (2005-2010), and as Cece King in New Zealand's longest-running drama television series Shortland Street (2019-2023). Other credits include Xena: Warrior Princess (1999), Jackson's Wharf (1999-2000), The Lost World (2001), The Strip (2002-2003), Being Eve (2002), Mercy Peak (2003), Orange Roughies (2006-2008), and Nothing Trivial (2011-2014).

Whippy made her directing debut on the feature film Vai, which premiered at the Berlin International Film Festival in 2019. Since then she has directed two series of well-loved New Zealand children's series Fejioa Club.

== Early life ==
Whippy was born Suva, Fiji in 1978). Her father worked as a fitter and turner, and because of work commitments the family relocated to Botany Downs, in east Auckland, New Zealand when she was two years old. She attended Pigeon Mountain Primary School, where she had her first taste in acting playing Delilah in the school musical Samson and Delilah, then Bucklands Beach Intermediate, before completing her education at Macleans College Secondary school, where she furthered her passion in acting, playing Olivia in Shakespeare’s Twelfth Night. She studied drama at the Unitec Institute of Technology, graduating with a BA degree in Performing and Screen Arts in 1999.

== Career ==
She has appeared in various shows including Jackson's Wharf (1999-2000), The Strip (2002-2003), Being Eve (2002), Orange Roughies (2006-2008) and Mercy Peak (2003).

She played a key role as Kasey Mason in 85 episodes of the hit comedy-drama Outrageous Fortune (2005-2010).

In 2011, she starred as hard-nosed divorcee Michelle Hardcastle in 31 episodes of the series Nothing Trivial (2011-2014).

In 2019, she starred as Cece King, a social worker who dealt with her mother-in-law's dementia and eventual death, her husband's sexual assault allegations, and her daughter's pyromania; She appeared in 682 episodes of New Zealand's longest-running drama television series Shortland Street (2019-2023). She also revealed that her mother is a maternal mental health nurse.

== Personal life ==
In the campaign for the New Zealand general election, 2011, Whippy attended a policy launch by the Green Party.

She runs the Point Chevalier Drama Club, for aspiring young actors between the ages of six to sixteen.

== Filmography ==
=== Film ===
Year	Title	Role	Notes
2000	Vertical Limit	Spanish Climber	
2010	The Box	Woman at Bar	Short
2019	The Other Side of Heaven 2: Fire of Faith	Tanita Paletu'a	
2024	Tinā	Rona	

=== Television ===
Year	Title	Role	Notes
1999	Xena: Warrior Princess	Chilapa	Episode: "Endgame"
1999–2000	Jackson's Wharf	Larissa Enari	Main role
2001	The Lost World	Maree	TV film
2002	Being Eve	Elektra	Episodes: "Being Individual", "Being Grown Up", "Being Tested"
2002–03	The Strip	Chocolate	Recurring role
2003	Mercy Peak	Cara-Lee	Episodes: "Reality Bites", "Great Escape", "Do It for Love"
2005–2010	Outrageous Fortune	Kasey Mason	Recurring role (series 1–2), regular (series 3–6)
2006–07	Orange Roughies	Donna Wiki	Recurring role
2011–2014	Nothing Trivial	Michelle Hardcastle	Main role
2017	Auckward Love	Thelma	TV series
2018	Westside	Kasey's Mum	Episode: "4.2"
2019–2023	Shortland Street	Cece King	Regular role
