= Kaitangata Twitch =

2010 New Zealand television series

- Based on: Kaitangata Twich by Margaret Mahy
- Written by: Michael Bennett; Gavin Strawhan; Briar Grace Smith
- Directed by: Yvonne Mackay
- Starring: Te Waimarie Kessell; George Henare; Charles Mesure; Miriama Smith
- Composer: Gareth Farr
- Country of origin: New Zealand
- Original language: English
- No. of seasons: 1
- No. of episodes: 13

Production
- Executive producers: Yvonne Mackay; Dorothee Pinfold
- Producer: Chris Hampson
- Cinematography: David Paul
- Editors: Lala Rolls; Paul Sutorius
- Running time: 25 minutes
- Budget: $6.2 million

Original release
- Release: 2010 – 2010

Kaitangata Twitch is a 2010 New Zealand television series. It was a 13 episode family series that starred Te Waimarie Kessell. It is based on the novel of the same name by Margaret Mahy. It was filmed in Governors Bay and Kaitangata Peninsula with filming taking place in the first half of 2009.

Kaitangata Twitch is the first major drama series produced for Maori Television. The Maori elements in original novel were further developed and strengthened for the TV series.

The island of Kaitangata twitches when it is angry. When it happened 50 years ago a 13-year-old girl disappeared. Meredith Gallagher develops a connection with the island.

== Cast ==
- Te Waimarie Kessell as Meredith Gallagher
- George Henare as Lee Kaa
- Charles Mesure as Carey Gallagher
- Miriama Smith as Grace Gallagher
- Kerry-Lee Dewing as Kate Gallagher
- Cejay Pickett as Rufus Gallagher
- Blair Strang as Sebastian Cardwell
- James Davies as Nick Lawson
- Francis Dale as Alan Ponty
- Charles Koroneho as Kaitangata

== Broadcast history ==
Kaitangata Twitch aired in Canada before playing on Maori TV beginning 2 May 2010. Australia showed it on ABC3 in October and the screening rights were sold in Sweden.

== Reception ==
The Nelson Mail's Alastair Paulin wrote after the first episode "From the first frame, of a stunning red dawn over Governors Bay, Kaitangata Twitch looks like a winner" adding "How great to see a Kiwi villa set in native bush looking over Governors Bay, filled with kids who could have stepped off the local playground." Linda Burgess of the Post says of the same, "At the end of episode one everything you need to know has been established and I can't imagine anyone not coming back for more." Leigh Paatsch gave it a 3 star capsual review in the Herald Sun saying it "features all the right elements for a thriller mystery aimed at younger viewers."

== Awards ==
Qantas Film and TV Awards 2010

- Best Performance by an Actor: George Henare – won
- Best Sound Design: Steve Finnigan, James Hayday & Tom Miskin – won
- Best Production Design: Gary Mackay – won
- Best Children's/Youth Programme – nominated
- Best Performance by a Supporting Actress: Miriama Smith – nominated
- Best Script – Drama/Comedy Programme: Michael Bennett – nominated
- Best Cinematography – Drama/Comedy Programme: David Paul – nominated
- Best Original Music: Gareth Farr – nominated

Sir Julius Vogel Awards 2011

- Best Dramatic Presentation

WorldFest (Houston) 2010

- Platinum Award
