= The Lost Children (TV series) =

- Starring: Hudson Mills; Mikaela Devitt; Beatrice Joblin; Rhys Castle-Hughes; Tandi Wright; John Bach; Brian Sergent
- Country of origin: New Zealand
- No. of episodes: 13

Original release
- Network: TVNZ
- Release: 2006 – 2006

The Lost Children is a New Zealand drama series set in 1867. It follows four children, three of whom were shipwrecked and landed on the coast off New Plymouth, New Zealand. Siblings Ethan and Amy, who were travelling with their mother, Charlotte, from England to Canterbury; Meg, a young thief and Tama, a young Maori slave. The series was released on DVD in New Zealand in January 2007.

== Production ==
The Lost Children was directed by Mike Smith and produced by John Gilbert and Big House. To fund the series, TVNZ used funds from a dividend reinvestment of funds paid to the government. The television series has 13 episodes. Child actor Rhys Castle-Hughes participated in rehearsals for two weeks and during filming still did his studies.

The television series was filmed in and near Wellington including in Thorndon and in beaches and parks. Filming was expected to last 10 weeks and 90 cast members and crew participated. The first day of filming on 11 July 2005 took almost 10 hours and was at Belmont Regional Park in the Wellington Region. The set had "tepee-style tents, muskets and tattooed Maori warriors".

== Plot summary ==
On a ship in 1867, siblings Ethan and Amy are travelling with their mother, Charlotte, from England to Canterbury. Their father is in Canterbury to start a family farm, and they are meeting him there. After their ship becomes flooded owing to a storm, the captain announces that everyone must leave the ship. Ethan and Amy join the child thief Meg on a lifeboat but they part company with their mother after the lifeboat is sent away by rogue wave. The three children become stranded on a far-flung beach on the coast of Taranaki. A group Māori marauders apprehend Meg, who befriends the Māori child slave Tama. After the Māori people start fighting with the Europeans, the four children join forces to try to get to the South Island.

== Cast ==
- Hudson Mills as Ethan
- Mikaela Devitt as Amy
- Rhys Castle-Hughes as Tama
- Beatrice Joblin as Meg
- Tandi Wright as Charlotte
- John Bach as Frank
- Brian Sergent as Harold

Nathaniel Lees and Antonia Prebble are guest stars on the show.

== Episodes ==
The series contained 13 episodes, the DVD case containing the following synopses:

- Chapter 1 – Shipwrecked on a rugged coastline, a young English boy struggles to find his family.
- Chapter 2 – Meg is abducted by Te Kahu and Frank destroys the children's message to their mother.
- Chapter 3 – The children get caught in a battle between the soldiers and the tribe.
- Chapter 4 – Escaping from the soldiers, the children take refuge and are confronted by a frightening tohunga.
- Chapter 5 – Meg's secret is revealed.
- Chapter 6 – Meg tries to rescue the others from the orphanage.
- Chapter 7 – Meg searches for her father while the others meet a dodgy botanist.
- Chapter 8 – The children enter a haunted village.
- Chapter 9 – Arriving in Wellington, the children have to find a way across Cook Strait.
- Chapter 10 – Conflict rages as the children are stranded on an island.
- Chapter 11 – The children finally set foot on the South Island but Tama is not welcome in his home.
- Chapter 12 – The journey through the mountains brings unexpected danger.
- Chapter 13 – The children and Charlotte arrive at the farm where Frank lies in wait.

== Reception ==
The Press called The Lost Children "a high-spirited adventure for young viewers and their parents". The Sunday Herald praised the television series, writing, "The Lost Children is set in 1867, but don't think this is just another boring historical drama. This is the fascinating story of a young English brother and sister, Ethan and Amy, and their unlikely friends, Meg and Tama."

Frances Grant of The New Zealand Herald penned a negative review of the television series. She wrote, "the kids' wildly fluctuating accents and their spruce appearance after supposedly being washed up on a wild foreign coast were distracting" and said "the acting, too, is stilted and seems to hark back to a more self-conscious era". Grant criticised the series for having an "eerie whistling soundtrack every time a Maori appears on the screen" and for "suffering from a Rip Van Winkle effect".
