= Manon Blackman =

New Zealand actress

- Born: United Kingdom
- Occupation: Actress
- Years active: 2011–present

Manon Blackman is a British born New Zealand actress. She is best known for playing Celeste Duvall in the comedy drama series Nothing Trivial and Lindsay in the comedy drama series 800 Words.

== Early life ==
Harris was born in the United Kingdom. Her parents split up before she was born. Her father stayed in her life until she was 11 when he married another woman. She moved to Auckland with her mother at the age of 5. She got her love for acting from her parents who had first met when studying musical theatre. One of her first performances was playing Peter Pan at the Aotea Centre at the age of 13. She graduated from the University of Otago with a bachelors degree in both history and Law.

== Career ==
Blackman made her on-screen debut with a recurring role as Celeste Duvall in the comedy drama series Nothing Trivial. She played the famous murderer dominatrix Renee Chignell in the crime docudrama film Mistress Mercy. Her biggest role so far has been playing Lindsay in the comedy drama series 800 Words.

== Filmography ==
=== Film ===
Year	Title	Role	Notes
2018	Mistress Mercy	Renee Chignell	
2019	Ablaze	Doreen Parsons	
2025	The People We Love	Maddie	

=== Television ===
Year	Title	Role	Notes
2011-2014	Nothing Trivial	Celeste Duvall	20 episodes
2016	Hillary	Hillary	Episode; Standing Tall
2016	Terry Teo	Penelope	2 episodes
2015-2018	800 Words	Lindsay	36 episodes
2021	My Life Is Murder	Stella Moore	Episode; Look Don't Touch
2025	The Brokenwood Mysteries	Isobel Wilson	Episode; How the Other Half Dies
