= Via Satellite =

- Directed by: Anthony McCarten
- Written by: Anthony McCarten; Greg McGee
- Produced by: Philippa Campbell
- Starring: Danielle Cormack; Tim Balme; Rima Te Wiata
- Cinematography: Simon Riera
- Edited by: John Gilbert
- Music by: David Bergeaud
- Release date: 1998
- Running time: 90 min
- Country: New Zealand
- Language: English

Via Satellite is a 1998 New Zealand film directed by Anthony McCarten based on his play of the same name. After playing at the Cannes Festival market it had its public premier opening the 1998 Wellington Film Festival on 17 July.

== Cast ==
- Danielle Cormack as Chrissy/Carol
- Tim Balme as Ken
- Rima Te Wiata as Jen
- Brian Sergent as Brian
- Jodie Dorday as Lyn
- Karl Urban as Paul
- Donna Akersten as Joyce

== Reception ==
Sunday Star Times's Rick Bryant gave it 4 stars and said "If Via Satellite has a marketing problem, it may be that it is too good, and the dingbats, usual suspects and assorted dullards just won't get it. On the other hand, it has been kept familiar, recognisable and completely unpretentious."

David Stratton in Variety said "This modest Kiwi outing offers a few fresh twists to basically familiar material in which members of a dysfunctional family are forced into an uneasy reunion. Thanks to strong performances, especially from lead actress Danielle Cormack, pic builds to a satisfying, emotional climax."

In the Honolulu Star-Bulletin Burl Burlingame gave it 2 1/2 stars at the Hawaii International Film Festival. He notes after a family secret is dropped "Nothing wrong with Family Secrets. They tend to inject juice into almost anything. But this fairly light-hearted romp stagers under the load and never quite gets off its knees thereafter."

Phillippa Hawker of the Age gave it 3 stars and said of a reveal of a family secret "it is a strange, almost gratuitous plot twist; it doesn't really illuminate any of the tensions we have seen between the family members and it glosses over others. It also requires a considerable shift in mood. It is too abrupt a transition for the film to sustain; it's an impossible lurch in a new, implausible direction." Tom Ryan of the Sunday Age gave it 1 1/2 stars and said wrote "McCarten's style-free sketch of this mixed-up family is drawn with broad strokes. rarely moving out of the realm of caricature. The cast works hard to make something of the thin material, Cormack alone (playing both Carol and her rebellious twin sister Chrissie) managing to transcend it."

== Awards ==
1999 New Zealand Film and Television Awards

- Best Supporting Actress - Jodie Dorday - won
- Best Editing - John Gilbert - won
