= 800 Words =

- Promotional title card for 800 Words
- Genre: Comedy drama
- Created by: James Griffin; Maxine Fleming
- Directed by: Pino Amenta; Mike Smith
- Starring: Erik Thomson; Melina Vidler; Benson Jack Anthony; Rick Donald; Bridie Carter; Emma Leonard; Alexander Tarrant; Michelle Langstone; Anna Jullienne; Cian Elyse White
- Composer: Karl Steven
- Countries of origin: New Zealand; Australia
- Original language: English
- No. of seasons: 3
- No. of episodes: 40

Production
- Executive producers: Kelly Martin; Chris Bailey; James Griffin; John Holmes; Julie McGauran
- Producers: Chris Hampson; Chris Bailey
- Cinematography: Fred Renata
- Running time: 45 minutes
- Production companies: Seven Productions; South Pacific Pictures

Original release
- Network: Seven Network; TVNZ 1
- Release: 15 September 2015 – 2 October 2018

800 Words (stylised as 800 words) is a comedy-drama television series, co-produced by South Pacific Pictures and Seven Productions for the Seven Network.

== Premise ==
George Turner is a popular columnist for a top-selling Sydney newspaper, writing a weekly column which he insists must be exactly 800 words. After his wife dies, he buys (online and unseen) a home in a (fictional) small New Zealand seaside town called Weld, where his parents took him on holiday as a child. He then has to break the news to his two teenage children, Shay and Arlo. But the colourful and inquisitive locals in Weld ensure Turner's dream of a fresh start does not go exactly to plan.

== Cast ==
=== Main ===
- Erik Thomson as George Turner
- Melina Vidler as Shay Turner
- Benson Jack Anthony as Arlo Turner
- Rick Donald as Jeff "Woody" Woodson, an Australian expat builder who moved to Weld for the surf
- Bridie Carter as Jan, George's former boss and editor in Sydney
- Emma Leonard as Tracey Dennis, an Australian expat and Shay and Arlo's form teacher at Weld High School
- Michelle Langstone as Fiona, the owner-operator of the Weld Boat Club and a volunteer ambulance driver
- Anna Jullienne as Katie Bell, a part-Maori artist and owner of the Weld arts and crafts gallery
- Cian Elyse White as Hannah, a surfer who works part-time at the Weld Boat Club and the local surf shop

=== Recurring ===
- Jonathan Brugh as Monty McNamara, a real estate agent who sold George his new home in Weld and is a volunteer firefighter
- Peter Elliott as Bill "Big Mac" McNamara, the financial kingpin of Weld and father to Bill Jr., Monty, and Robbie
- Paul Glover as Bill McNamara Jr., father to Lindsay and Jared
- Manon Blackman as Lindsay McNamara, Bill Jr.'s daughter.
- Matt Holden as Jared McNamara, Bill Jr.'s son
- Olivia Tennet as Siouxsie McNamara, Monty's daughter and secretary
- John Leigh as Constable Tom, Weld's local police officer and photographer
- Alex Tarrant as Ike, one of Zac's children and love interest of Shay
- Reon Bell as Billy, Katie and Zac's son
- Rob Kipa-Williams as Zac, Katie's ex-partner and father to Ike, Hannah, and Billy
- Renee Lyons as Brenda, runs the supermarket
- Jesse Griffin as Sean, works for the local council
- Henry Beasley as Ollie, works at the petrol station, has a crush on Shay
- David Fane as Smiler
- Tandi Wright as Laura Turner (flashbacks), deceased wife of George and mother to Shay and Arlo
- Elizabeth Hawthorne as Trish, Laura's mother
- Peter Hayden as Roger, Laura's father
- Jackie van Beek as Gloria (season 2), production manager of the local newspaper, News of the Weld
- Millen Baird as Robert "Robbie" McNamara (season 2), Fiona's ex
- Ditch Davey as Terry Turner (season 2), George's younger brother, a chef
- Jamaica Vaughan as Emma (season 2), Fiona's niece and summer love interest of Arlo
- Jessica Redmayne as Poppy (season 3), Woody's 16-year-old daughter
- Rachael Carpani as Mary (season 3), Woody's ex and mother to Poppy
- Miriama Smith as Ngahuia (season 3), Zac's ex and mother to Ike

== Production ==
The series was first announced on 29 October 2014 with the Channel Seven 2015 highlights. The CEO of South Pacific Pictures, Kelly Martin said "Seven loved the scripts from the start and we're thrilled to have this project underway. It enables South Pacific Pictures to broaden our horizons and it'll open up some great opportunities for our local actors and crew." Of the series' tone, the Program Chief of Seven, Tim Ross stated, "If you think this show has a bit of the same feel and vibe as Packed to the Rafters, you're dead right—and we make no apologies for that." Filming for the series began on 2 March 2015.

On 19 October 2015, the Seven Network and South Pacific Pictures renewed the show for a second season. It premiered on 23 August 2016 in Australia. On 24 January 2017, the Seven Network announced that the series had been renewed for a third season. It screened from 12 September 2017 with a mid-season finale after eight episodes.

On 17 August 2018 Seven Network cancelled the series after three seasons.

== Episodes ==
=== Series overview ===
Season	Episodes		Originally released	
Season	Episodes		First released	Last released
1	8		15 September 2015	3 November 2015
2	16	8	23 August 2016	4 October 2016
2	16	8	31 January 2017	21 March 2017
3	16	8	12 September 2017	24 October 2017
3	16	8	August 14, 2018	October 2, 2018

=== Season 1 (2015) ===
No. overall	No. in series	Episode	Directed by	Written by	Original release date	Aus. viewers
1	1	"Episode 1"	Pino Amenta	James Griffin	15 September 2015	1,219,000
Following the death of his wife, column writer George Turner breaks the news to his two teenaged children that they will be moving from Sydney to Weld, New Zealand. They arrive in the small coastal town to a run-away sculpture, a half-finished home, and nosy neighbours.
2	2	"Episode 2"	Pino Amenta	Maxine Fleming and James Griffin	22 September 2015	1,192,000
Having written a column in the previous episode that referred to Weld as a "dead-end" town, George faces the full wrath of the locals. This causes friction for everyone, including Shay and Arlo, who struggle to fit in at school.
3	3	"Episode 3"	Mike Smith	James Griffin	29 September 2015	1,170,000
After refusing to reveal the cause of his wife's death, rumours run wild in Weld about George, and his concerns about the school bus driver exacerbate things. He traces the lies back to their source while Shay makes new connections with a local, Ike.
4	4	"Episode 4"	Mike Smith	Maxine Fleming and James Griffin	6 October 2015	1,055,000
George considers the women of Weld and whether he is ready for romance after the death of his wife. He and Arlo learn more about the salacious history of Weld via one of the McNamaras' ancestors. Shay hides her new relationship with Ike from her family and the two graffiti a sign about the new housing development to be built on campsite land by McNamaras.
5	5	"Episode 5"	Mike Smith	Tim Balme	13 October 2015	1,082,000
The late Laura Turner's birthday approaches and her husband and children disagree on how to mark the day. George relives unpleasant memories from his childhood time in Weld surfing which leads to a surf challenge with 'the Orca'. Shay and Ike continue their fight to protect the local camp ground from development.
6	6	"Episode 6"	Mike Smith	Natalie Medlock and James Griffin	20 October 2015	1,019,000
Truths are revealed when George and Arlo play detective on two fronts: the case of the missing statue head and Shay's love life. Shay and Ike enter one wing of Big Mac's house to discover a model railway and a model of the new housing development with further towering flats. They take photos but are caught.
7	7	"Episode 7"	Pino Amenta	Maxine Fleming and James Griffin	27 October 2015	1,027,000
Shay and Ike face the legal and emotional consequences of their actions. Arlo shows Shay that Ike has a reputation for sleeping with girls and moving on and she dumps him. She rejects offers of help from George and some of the women in town. George realizes his own limitations as a parent and writes an unusually personal column. This makes Shay cry but still she manipulates Ike into driving her to the airport so she can escape back to Sydney.
8	8	"Episode 8"	Pino Amenta	James Griffin	3 November 2015	1,151,000
Efforts to save the campground heat up. Jan arrives in town and helps George deal with the fallout from Shay's departure, with unexpected results. The two sleep together but miss the 'beginning magic'. Having slipped into the 'middle' part of a relationship. they later agree they made a mistake. The town's councillors vote to let the development go ahead.

=== Season 2 (2016–2017) ===
No. overall	No. in series	Episode	Directed by	Written by	Original release date	Aus. viewers
Part 1
9	1	"Episode 1"	Mike Smith	Tim Balme and James Griffin	23 August 2016	877,000
While the rest of the town prepare for Guy Fawkes Night, George and Arlo enact a plan to get Shay back to Weld, pretending things are good without her. Jan and George decide their relationship is not working. Lindsay moves into Shay's old room after her Dad threatens her with boarding school and she runs away from home. Shay returns in time for Guy Fawkes' Night. Arlo gives up his room to Lindsay and sleeps on a blow-up bed.
10	2	"Episode 2"	Mike Smith	Tim Balme	30 August 2016	742,000
The limits of friendship are tested when Woody produces an invoice for George. But the underlying issue is that Woody has feelings for Tracey and thinks Tracey likes George. Despite his best efforts, George finds himself employed several times over. George encourages Tracey to talk to Woody, and she says with a promotion to fight for she has no time for dating and only wants him as a friend.
11	3	"Episode 3"	Michael Hurst	Maxine Fleming	6 September 2016	793,000
The discovery of a crash site and a body reveals truths to Lindsay about her family and to George about pitfalls to avoid when you are the editor of a small town paper. Shay and Arlo think Lindsay is failing to grieve when the body turns out to be that of her long-lost mother. Lindsay throws a party and Shay introduces her Sydney boyfriend to everyone.
12	4	"Episode 4"	Michael Hurst	Kate McDermott	13 September 2016	618,000
George's dream house on the hill comes up for sale, the one he holidayed in as a child. He considers another move, especially given he now has four teenagers living in his house. Woody starts an affair with Becks, the owner of the house on the hill. Shay grows less keen on her boyfriend Daniel, even though he cooks and compliments her frequently. George is rattled by his kitchen being taken over. Daniel leaves before Shay breaks up with him, and takes Lindsay for a road-trip – before Arlo was to tell her to move back to her Dad's. Everyone welcomes the extra space. George does not buy the house on the hill.
13	5	"Episode 5"	Murray Keane	Sarah-Kate Lynch and James Griffin	20 September 2016	592,000
George and Katie go on a date and end up kissing. However, both are nervous. Everyone wants to know why he has not asked her on a second date. The 'summer people' continue to annoy the locals. The campground development takes an unexpected turn when Constable Tom herds the free / illegal campers onto the site as he is fed-up of chasing them to clean up their mess. Big Mac seems powerless to remove them despite now owning the land. He agrees to give the land back to the locals.
14	6	"Episode 6"	Murray Keane	James Griffin	27 September 2016	695,000
As more summer people crowd the beach, Woody gets hit by a jet ski, ending up in an induced coma. George starts a Twitter war against Jet skis. Becks realises tracey should be with Woody, so says goodbye when he comes round. Shay realises Ike may be leaving for uni and reconciles with him. Arlo gets a job at the boat club and flirts with the new waitress, Emma. Tracey and Woody get together at last.
15	7	"Episode 7"	Mike Smith	James Griffin	4 October 2016	800,000
As the one-year anniversary of Laura's death approaches, it emerges that Shay has stolen her mother's ashes from her grand-parents not wanting her to end up in a crypt. The grand-parents come to Weld and Fiona offers her unoccupied marital house as accommodation for them. Zac and Katie provide a temporary, respectful resting place (a Maori box) whilst the family try to resolve the 'final resting place' issue. Fiona is shocked to hear that Robbie, her ex, Big Mac's son, will be out of prison soon. Arlo and Emma kiss. Laura's ashes are taken to the waterfall and scattered.
16	8	"Episode 8"	Mike Smith	Kate McDermott	4 October 2016	728,000
A game of cricket looms large in Weld as they play the more dominant Stafford. Monty plays well but Robbie refuses to run when they bat together, so Monty is out. George releases his 'demon' bowler and swears a great deal. Tracey hears she has the promotion to principal – but Woody misses a catch as he congratulates her. Arlo and Emma use his empty house to consummate their relationship before Emma returns home. Fiona and George go in to bat and win the match for Weld. Shay breaks up with Ike to force him to leave Weld and go to uni in Auckland. Fiona and George kiss after the post-match party.
Part 2
17	9	"Episode 9"	Michael Hurst	Kate McDermott	31 January 2017	797,000
Fiona wants to end her marriage but Robbie tries to change her mind by reawaking early memories as they prepare to sell their house. Robbie warns George to stay away from Fiona. He is over-bearing in the estate agency and his niece walks out of her job there. Katie is upset by the kiss but denies it when George apologises. Meanwhile, Jan finds it difficult to keep her pregnancy secret, and is abrupt with George. Robbie continues to try to block the sale of the house and keeps calling Monty 'Maureen'. A fight erupts in the street which soon includes more men. Big Mac and Constable Tom break it up. Monty stands up to Robbie and gets his daughter back to work at the estate agency.
18	10	"Episode 10"	Michael Hurst	Michael Beran & James Griffin	7 February 2017	737,000
George and Fiona throw a dinner party but a small gathering ends up being an event for 12 couples (some of whom are not even couples). They decide to buy a larger dining table. Fiona is concerned George is assuming they will run the dinner as he and Laura used to: with him cooking. George agrees to share the responsibilities. The guests arrive. Jan calls to say she needs a new column as the one George has submitted clashes with a main feature. He has till 2 am to write a new one. George burns his hands and drops food on the floor, so gets typing help. The guests sort out dinner. Arlo minds the boatclub and has to deal with the drunken McNamaras returning from the races. Robbie gate-crashes the dinner party.
19	11	"Episode 11"	Caroline Bell-Booth	Sarah-Kate Lynch & Kate McDermott	14 February 2017	647,000
Arlo tricks his Dad into signing a form allowing him to switch from an academic (physics and maths classes) stream to the 'Gateway' programme. He wants to be a chef and wants work experience credits. The other kids in class mock him as he has joined the 'numpties'. This group include Lindsay who is repeating a year, and Billy (who is clever but in specific areas such as bird migration). Shay wonders what she will do with her life. George worries about them both. Fiona wonders where she fits into the Turner family.
20	12	"Episode 12"	Caroline Bell-Booth	Tim Balme	21 February 2017	718,000
George and Fiona have a weekend away. Shay's mural is blocked by Council permits. Arlo's attempt at a quiet night with Emma go up in flames when Lindsay brings friends over to party. She gets Emma drunk so Emma and Arlo don't make out, and Ollie causes the BBQ to explode bringing the fire brigade round. George and Fiona return, and Emma is sent back to her Mum's. Jan finally tells George she is expecting twins – but the father might be George, the man she had an affair with in Sydney, or Ike's dad (whom she slept with on Guy Fawkes' night after she and George broke up).
21	13	"Episode 13"	Michael Hurst	James Griffin	28 February 2017	639,000
Fiona and George struggle to find time to process Jan's news. Fiona decides she wants to have babies and the clock is ticking but George feels his baby-rearing days are over, so they split up. Shay is making paintings for Dennis to sign as his own, and Ike objects to this as fraud, so they split up. Emma asks Arlo if they might see other people when they are not together. He thinks this is a test but it turns out Emma wants to get back with her ex. George's chef brother Terry arrives in Weld and starts showing off. George is worried he will crash and burn as he usually does.
22	14	"Episode 14"	Michael Hurst	Sarah-Kate Lynch	7 March 2017	594,000
Terry charms Arlo and all of Weld with his plans for a new restaurant, backed by Big Mac. Terry sleeps with Hannah and invites her to be his Maitre D. At the opening, a painting Shay placed as a 'Dennis' is sold to Rae by Bill. George has trouble convincing everyone his brother is not as trustworthy as he seems, and must reluctantly write positive reviews for the paper. However, he refuses to give a speech about Terry at the restaurant's opening night and afterwards Terry punches him in the face. Lindsay follows Arlo's lead and refuses alcohol offered by Terry, and the teens end up kissing.
23	15	"Episode 15"	Mike Smith	Michael Beran & James Griffin	14 March 2017	591,000
George works on an article about Terry's restaurant, and the changes that he sees in Weld since it opened. Steve arrives by helicopter in pursuit of Jan who has fled Sydney. Soon, Steve, George and Zac are round at Big Mac's hassling Jan as the potential baby-fathers. Katie has second thoughts about the art deception after Rae has an expert assess the restaurant 'Dennis' and declare it likely to be a fraud. However, Rae decides she wants to keep it for free and have Dennis sign it when he returns to NZ in exchange for her keeping quiet. Ollie persuades Shay that the best way out is to steal the painting and burn it.
24	16	"Episode 16"	Mike Smith	James Griffin	21 March 2017	681,000
George's article is published and Terry quits. However, as George did not criticise his cooking, only his being out of place in Weld, George knows he is not the reason. When he finally finds Terry, Terry says he has been offered six months work with a Saudi prince and he can't take Hannah. She knows she is being dumped and is very upset. Ollie tells Ike he and Shay are together and Ike tries to warn Shay that she needs to be clear with Ollie where he stands (but doesn't explain exactly why). Fiona and Robbie's marital home is sold. Katie decides to sever ties with Dennis as Rae now wants her to supply fake paintings to a friend's gallery. Mac asks Jan to share his life and home. Tracey and Woody get engaged, but privately Woody panics. George and Terry have a cooking showdown but are interrupted by Constable Tom. He has found Zac's boat – empty – and needs to know who was on board. Jan's waters break.

=== Season 3 (2017–2018) ===
No. overall	No. in series	Episode	Directed by	Written by	Original release date	Aus. viewers
Part 1
25	1	"Episode 1"	Mike Smith	Tim Balme	12 September 2017	696,000
Weld mounts operation search and rescue for Ike, Zac and Steve. Billy figures out where they would wash up but is initially ignored. He and Arlo go to the bay and spot life jackets but then Billy falls. Zac and Steve return to town on foot, reporting that Ike swam on his own. Ollie's drone camera spots Ike, and Hannah and Woody take a boat to the location and pull Ike out of the water alive. Shay is ecstatic. Throughout the search Jan has been in labour and kept unaware of the predicament of two of the potential baby-fathers. She has her twin boys. Then she goes into haemorrhage, and the hospital staff take over.
26	2	"Episode 2"	Mike Smith	Kate McDermott	19 September 2017	633,000
Jan and the twins come to George's after the hospital. Most of Weld comes to see them, and hold the babies. Steve says he loves Jan, whoever the father turns out to be. Blood tests knock out two baby-father candidates. Steve is last man standing, and he and Jan are both happy. But George has now had second thoughts about the reason he and Fiona split; perhaps he could have more kids?... It seems that Shay and Ike are back together but as Ike recovers from floating at sea, things are a little awkward. At Woody and Tracey's surprise engagement party, Woody gives a touching speech but then runs out in a panic. He tells George about his long ago teenage marriage: he isn't divorced.
27	3	"Episode 3"	Michael Hurst	James Griffin	26 September 2017	587,000
George is recruited as a reluctant accomplice in a secret mission to find Woody's first wife and obtain the divorce. Ike explains he saw and heard his ancestors and Shay's mother whilst unconscious at sea. He wants to be alone to process this. Shay is heart-broken. Big Mac tells Fiona he has arranged for Robbie to stay with relatives in Auckland, and she seems relieved. Katie resurrects a teaching career with the Gateway students, who are now unsupervised since the restaurant (and the work experience it offered) has closed. This is necessary as she won't earn much from the gallery anymore since severing ties with Dennis. Ike's mother, Ngahuia, turns up. Woody rings his first wife about the divorce but she insists he comes to see her rather than do the divorce by post.
28	4	"Episode 4"	Michael Hurst	Sarah-Kate Lynch & James Griffin	3 October 2017	624,000
George gets an unlikely message from beyond the grave when Ike tells the family what Laura said to him whilst he was lost at sea. Woody gathers a team of friends to help locate his first wife, but soon almost everyone in Weld know about his secret. Since she is in Australia, they plan a 'conference' trip connected to the new solar business Woody is starting as cover. Meanwhile, Hannah, who reviewed her life after Terry left her, has decided she wants to be a cop. She has a challenge convincing Constable Tom she'd suit the role. Eventually, Tom agrees to take her on as a support officer (more of an admin role), but Hannah thinks she will be an investigator. Monty is thrilled Ngahuia is back and hopes to re-ignite an old fling.
29	5	"Episode 5"	Caroline Bell-Booth & Chris Bailey	Tim Balme	10 October 2017	580,000
George's fears about Operation Quickie Divorce are realised when Woody finds his ex-wife in Australia running a diner – and Woody learns he is the father of her daughter Poppy. The divorce is completed and after his initial freak-out reaction to fatherhood, Woody bonds a little with Poppy and invites her to Weld to avoid the sexist, grabby men who visit the diner. Tracey has meantime learnt what everyone else knows, that Woody was previously married and never told her. She is furious and when Woody returns she tells him to leave. Shay has problems getting Ollie to back off. Siouxsie tells Shay that Ollie has history with mis-reading girls' signals.
30	6	"Episode 6"	Caroline Bell-Booth	Natalie Medlock & Kate McDermott & James Griffin	17 October 2017	513,000
Woody and Poppy are staying at the Turners. Monty and Siouxsie move in too as their roof has a leak, so there are eight people in the house. George longs for solitude but his plan to get rid of his unwanted guests backfires when both his children move out instead: Shay to share an empty holiday home with Siouxsie, and Arlo to stay with Lindsay at her grand-father's (Big Mac's). Woody does not know what to do about Tracey. George suggests he enrol Poppy in school, as she needs to be enrolled and he will also speak with Tracey, the principal. But only at a second meeting does he manage to start making amends. Ngahuia is made temporary editor of the newspaper whilst it merges with the digital age.
31	7	"Episode 7"	Helena Brooks	Pip Hall & James Griffin & Kate McDermott	24 October 2017	567,000
George has an empty house. Woody asks him to be his best man as he will write the best speech. At his Groomspiel (stag do) Woody fears for his safety, so George drinks many of Woody's shots. Whilst George is out, Shay and Siouxsie raid his fridge. The women have a hen party and accidentally meet up with the stags at a night club in Stafford. Fiona and Zac get together in the hen's bus when she thinks he may be Weld's most fertile man. George gets thrown out for objecting to punctuation errors on the signs. Katie gets thrown out for inviting Ngahuia to throw a drink at her (to even up a previous incident where she threw beetroot at Ngahuia). George and Katie end up in the bus interrupting the other couple. Arlo makes a dinner for five. Shay tries to set Arlo and Poppy up, asking him to walk her home, even though Lindsay is there. Woody asks Monty to be his best man as he has known him much longer than George. Later, Tracey asks Poppy to be her bridesmaid.
32	8	"Episode 8"	Helena Brooks	Kate McDermott	24 October 2017	516,000
George helps Monty write the best man speech and ponders his own wedding.
Part 2
33	9	"Episode 9"	Mike Smith	James Griffin & Kate McDermott	14 August 2018	507,000
Monty panics over his best man speech and begs George for help. Shay starts a cleaning job in the holiday rentals and Ollie hassles her in one of the houses even after she tells him she is not interested. Later he sends his drone after her and she smashes it up. Fiona discovers Zac has had a vasectomy so she won't have got pregnant from their tryst. There is a power cut, so innovative ideas are utilised to prep for Woody and Tracey's wedding. Monty's speech goes well. Arlo dances with Poppy to Lindsay's chagrin. George is faced with two requests: help ex-girlfriend Fiona become pregnant (by donating sperm, not by being involved), or pursue romance with Katie after they kiss. Siouxsie threatens Ollie after he grabs Shay's wrist, and Constable Tom intervenes; later Ollie leaves Weld. Arlo tries to navigate the Lindsay situation but is pushed into the wedding cake. Monty hooks up with Ngahuia.
34	10	"Episode 10"	Mike Smith	Michael Beran & Kate McDermott	21 August 2018	472,000
George's romantic night with Katie unravels. Fiona's baby plans hit an emotional and financial snag. volunteer fire-fighter Dwayne brings a fitness boot camp to Weld. Siouxsie fancies Dwayne and signs herself and Shay up. But Dwayne later accuses her of harassment.
35	11	"Episode 11"	Michael Hurst	Kate McDermott	28 August 2018	446,000
George and Katie test their new relationship with a winter camp.Arlo and Billy agree to go but Shay opts out. Then Tracey and Woody decide to join in. Zac showed up too with a camper van. He starts to play the he-man when George fails to spear fish and Arlo admits he thought there would be a shop and shower block. Arlo and Poppy grow closer and kiss in the woods, but Billy sees. George and Katie row but then make-up. Zac leaves and Katie says she knew he never speared fish when they camped there years ago: he bought them from a fisherman with a boat! Shay struggles when she realises Ike is sleeping with another young woman. Big Mac has a grand tourist plan for Weld and makes a promotional film declaring Weld a republic.
36	12	"Episode 12"	Michael Hurst	James Griffin	4 September 2018	473,000
Arlo two-times Lindsay and Poppy as he can't find a way to tell Lindsay it is over. George worries he and Katie are causing Billy's stress problem. In fact, Billy is stressed over holding on to Arlo's secret. Siouxsie suggests the best way for Shay to feel better over Ike is to sleep with someone else. At a dance she bonds with Dwayne and takes him back to her Dad's house. However, when he gets romantic, saying he'd want to go running with her next day, she admits she'd only be using him for his body and he leaves in disgust. Arlo breaks up with Lindsay and she attacks Poppy in school; both girls are suspended. Because she is Siouxsie's cousin and her Dad says she'll go to boarding school now, Siouxsie feels obliged to offer Lindsay refuge, much to Shay's chagrin.
37	13	"Episode 13"	Caroline Bell-Booth	Michael Beran & Kate McDermott	11 September 2018	479,000
George and Woody fail to make up after Arlo's shenanigans (Woody believes Poppy was defending herself in the fight and should not have been suspended). Ike receives unlikely help from Shay in his spiritual quest. He plans to search for the remains of a female ancestor who was chased into the forest. His mother is onside with this but his Dad thinks this is a goose chase and will delay Ike from going to uni for a second time – and he'll be stuck in Weld for the rest of his life. A council restructure has Weld at risk of being swallowed up by Stafford and Big Mac leads the resistance.
38	14	"Episode 14"	Caroline Bell-Booth	Sarah-Kate Lynch	18 September 2018	459,000
Sioxsie and Shay pick up Joe, a hitchhiker, and tell him they are Thelma and Louise. They offer him a place to stay and Shay and Joe kiss. She tells home her real name is Shay Turner, not Louise, and he runs off. Later it emerges he is the son of the man who killed Laura. Katie tries to mediate and Joe explains he over-dosed the day his Dad ran down Laura; this was why he was texting and running a red light. Joe has younger brothers and they need their Dad back. George and Arlo decide not to protest the killer's parole, but Shay is still furious. Poppy punches Bill Jr. when he insults her and drunkenly tries to take liquor from the boat club bar.
39	15	"Episode 15"	Mike Smith	Pip Hall	25 September 2018	506,000
Upset with Katie, Shay avoids family dinners at home. Jan visits and suggests Shay come live with her and help with the twins whilst figuring out what she wants from life. Katie's house is sold but she hasn't been looking for a new place. She won't move in with George unless all the kids are happy with that. Lindsay sets up malicious social media accounts in Poppy's name. Tracey handles by bringing in Constable Tom to remind everyone of the law. Lindsay deletes the accounts. In a school ball craft session she threatens to glue Billy's glasses to his face and in response Poppy cuts off a big chunk of hair. Tracey bans Poppy from the ball. Woody thinks this unfair. He has invited Mary, Poppy's mother, to visit for the ball. Bill Jr. nominates Maxine the alpaca as a presidential candidate for Weld. Maxine wins, with Fiona second. Fiona discovers her boyfriend is working with Big Mac to keep Stafford and Weld separate as it will be easier to change land use through Weld's smaller town council. They plan to build a space station! Shay shocks everyone when she says she wants to be a lawyer like her mother. This means she'll need to go back to school and move back home – so Katie and Billy still need to find a place to stay. Jan and George row. Jan sleeps with Zac.
40	16	"Episode 16"	Mike Smith	Kate McDermott	2 October 2018	460,000
With Shay staying with her father again, there is no room for Billy, so Katie rents a tiny house-truck. Shay panics faced with an exam and walks out. Poppy's mother arrives and Woody tells the truth. She considers taking Poppy back to Australia but eventually decides Poppy is happy and that she will move to NZ. At the ball, Lindsay makes another snippy comment and Billy tells her she was the mean girl at pre-school and she'll end up being the mean old lady in her old people's home. Lindsay flees the ball and seeks refuge in the chill room in the shop. Shay comforts her and suggests she become Jan's au pair, which she does. George releases the news about the land deal and the bull-dozing of homes. He quits his job as a result. The besotted Monty decides to break off his affair with Ngahuia as she was part of the planners' group (as a senior Kiwi) and did not appreciate that homes were sold to be knocked down – not houses. This included Katie's house. George drives Katie's house-truck to his house so they are together. George tells Shay and Arlo that their mother left money in trust for them to have when they are 21 – but Shay can have hers early and go travelling with Siouxsie (so there will be a room for Billy). Big Mac introduces Fiona to his 4-year-old grandson by Robbie (conceived on his stag night and now left by the mother). Fiona has the option to start a family with her boyfriend but doesn't trust him because of the land deal; she agrees to parent the abandoned boy. The land situation is not resolved.

== Release ==
=== Broadcast ===
The series premiered in Australia on 15 September 2015 on the Seven Network and premiered in New Zealand on 5 November 2015 on TVNZ 1. In the United States, the series premiered on Acorn TV in 2016 and PBS in March 2017. UPtv acquired the series and will air it later this year. The series premiered in Finland on YLE TV1 in June 2017. In the UK, the first two series were broadcast on BBC One in April/May 2018. The third series was shown in the UK on BBC One in July/August 2019.

=== Home media ===
Season one along with part one and two of season two are available on iTunes in Australia.

Title	Set details	DVD release dates				Special features
Title	Set details	Region 1	Region 2	Region 4		Special features
Title	Set details	Region 1	Region 2	Australia	New Zealand	Special features
800 Words	Discs: 2; Episodes: 8	13 December 2016	31 December 2017	4 November 2015	18 December 2015	Behind-the-Scenes Featurette
800 Words; Season 2 Volume 1	Discs: 2; Episodes: 8	18 April 2017	—N/a	12 October 2016	—N/a	Behind-the-Scenes Featurette
800 Words; Season 2 Volume 2	Discs: 2; Episodes: 8	22 August 2017	—N/a	5 April 2017	—N/a	Behind-the-Scenes Featurettes: Melina's Tour of Weld; Interview with Erik Thomson
800 Words; Season 2	Episodes: 16	—N/a	31 December 2018 (2 discs)	—N/a	11 May 2017 (4 discs)	
800 Words; Season 3 Volume 1	Discs: 2; Episodes: 8	23 October 2018	TBA	7 March 2018	TBA	
800 Words; Season 3 Volume 2	Discs: 2; Episodes: 8	5 February 2019	TBA	TBA	TBA	

==== Compilations ====
Title	DVD release dates		Special features
Title	Region 2	Region 4 (Australia)	Special features
800 Words; Complete Seasons 1&2 (24 episodes)	31 December 2018 (4 discs)	5 April 2017 (6 discs)	Region 4: Romance and Women of Weld; Melina's Tour of Weld; Interview with Erik Thomson

== Ratings ==
800 Words : Australia viewers per episode (thousands)

Season	Episode number															
Season	1	2	3	4	5	6	7	8	9	10	11	12	13	14	15	16
1	1219	1192	1170	1055	1082	1019	1027	1151	–							
2	877	742	793	618	592	695	800	728	797	737	647	718	639	594	591	681
3	696	633	587	624	580	513	567	516	507	472	446	473	479	459	506	450

Source: Audience measurement performed by OzTam

=== Season 1 ===
No.	Title	Air date	Overnight ratings		Consolidated ratings		Total viewers	Ref(s)
No.	Title	Air date	Viewers	Rank	Viewers	Rank	Total viewers	Ref(s)
1	Episode 1	15 September 2015	1,219,000	2	131,000	1	1,350,000	
2	Episode 2	22 September 2015	1,192,000	1	217,000	1	1,409,000	
3	Episode 3	29 September 2015	1,170,000	1	233,000	1	1,403,000	
4	Episode 4	6 October 2015	1,055,000	2	254,000	1	1,309,000	
5	Episode 5	13 October 2015	1,082,000	1	225,000	1	1,307,000	
6	Episode 6	20 October 2015	1,019,000	2	235,000	1	1,254,000	
7	Episode 7	27 October 2015	1,027,000	3	219,000	1	1,246,000	
8	Episode 8	3 November 2015	1,151,000	6	165,000	4	1,316,000	

=== Season 2 ===
No.	Title	Air date	Overnight ratings		Consolidated ratings		Total viewers	Ref(s)
No.	Title	Air date	Viewers	Rank	Viewers	Rank	Total viewers	Ref(s)
1	Episode 1	23 August 2016	877,000	7	164,000	4	1,041,000	
2	Episode 2	30 August 2016	742,000	11	209,000	6	951,000	
3	Episode 3	6 September 2016	793,000	11	238,000	3	1,031,000	
4	Episode 4	13 September 2016	618,000	14	228,000	8	846,000	
5	Episode 5	20 September 2016	592,000	14	221,000	9	813,000	
6	Episode 6	27 September 2016	695,000	12	175,000	7	870,000	
7	Episode 7	4 October 2016	800,000	9	192,000	4	992,000	
8	Episode 8	4 October 2016	728,000	10	169,000	8	897,000	
9	Episode 9	31 January 2017	797,000	9	211,000	4	1,008,000	
10	Episode 10	7 February 2017	737,000	10	198,000	7	935,000	
11	Episode 11	14 February 2017	647,000	12	207,000	7	854,000	
12	Episode 12	21 February 2017	718,000	11	176,000	7	894,000	
13	Episode 13	28 February 2017	639,000	11	207,000	8	846,000	
14	Episode 14	7 March 2017	594,000	13	225,000	7	819,000	
15	Episode 15	14 March 2017	591,000	12	210,000	9	801,000	
16	Episode 16	21 March 2017	681,000	11	212,000	7	893,000	

=== Season 3 ===
No.	Title	Air date	Overnight ratings		Consolidated ratings		Total viewers	Ref(s)
No.	Title	Air date	Viewers	Rank	Viewers	Rank	Total viewers	Ref(s)
1	Episode 1	12 September 2017	696,000	10	159,000	7	855,000	
2	Episode 2	19 September 2017	633,000	10	146,000	8	779,000	
3	Episode 3	26 September 2017	587,000	11	163,000	8	750,000	
4	Episode 4	3 October 2017	624,000	10	150,000	8	774,000	
5	Episode 5	10 October 2017	580,000	12	172,000	9	752,000	
6	Episode 6	17 October 2017	513,000	15	193,000	9	706,000	
7	Episode 7	24 October 2017	567,000	13	171,000	9	738,000	
8	Episode 8	24 October 2017	516,000	14	197,000	11	713,000	
9	Episode 9	14 August 2018	507,000	15	155,000	11	662,000	
10	Episode 10	21 August 2018	472,000	17	184,000	11	656,000	
11	Episode 11	28 August 2018	446,000	17	162,000	11	608,000	
12	Episode 12	4 September 2018	473,000	16	174,000	11	647,000	
13	Episode 13	11 September 2018	479,000	16	143,000	11	622,000	
14	Episode 14	18 September 2018	459,000	18	160,000	11	619,000	
15	Episode 15	25 September 2018	506,000	16	135,000	11	641,000	
16	Episode 16	2 October 2018	460,000	17	182,000	11	642,000	

== Remake ==
On 8 January 2018, Zomer in Zeeland (translated: Summer in Zeeland) premiered on the Dutch channel SBS6. The show stars Daniël Boissevain as Sjors Mulder, Pip Pellens as his daughter Fenna Mulder and Tonko Bossen as his son Jurgen Mulder. The remake follows the same storyline, but changes the setting to the Dutch province of Zeeland, after which the country of New Zealand was named.
