= So You Wanna Be a Popstar? (New Zealand TV series) =

- Starring: Oliver Driver (host)
- Country of origin: New Zealand

Original release
- Network: TVNZ
- Release: 2005 – 2005

So You Wanna Be a Popstar? is a New Zealand celebrity karaoke reality series that pits celebrities against each other in front of a judging panel.

== The singers ==
- John "Cocksy" Cocks
- Jessie Gurunathan
- Mikey Havoc
- David Wikaira-Paul
- Katrina Hobbs
- Blair Strang
- Louise Wallace

== Christmas Special ==
On Christmas Day 2005, the cast of So You Wanna Be a Popstar? got together to sing Christmas carols. Guests included New Zealand Idol season 2 winner Rosita Vai and runner-up Nik Carlson with Teresa Bergman and Graham Brazier.

== Dutch version ==
A Dutch version of So You Wanna Be a Popstar was broadcast on SBS6 in 2007.
