= Toroa (ferry) =

Passenger ferry in Auckland, New Zealand

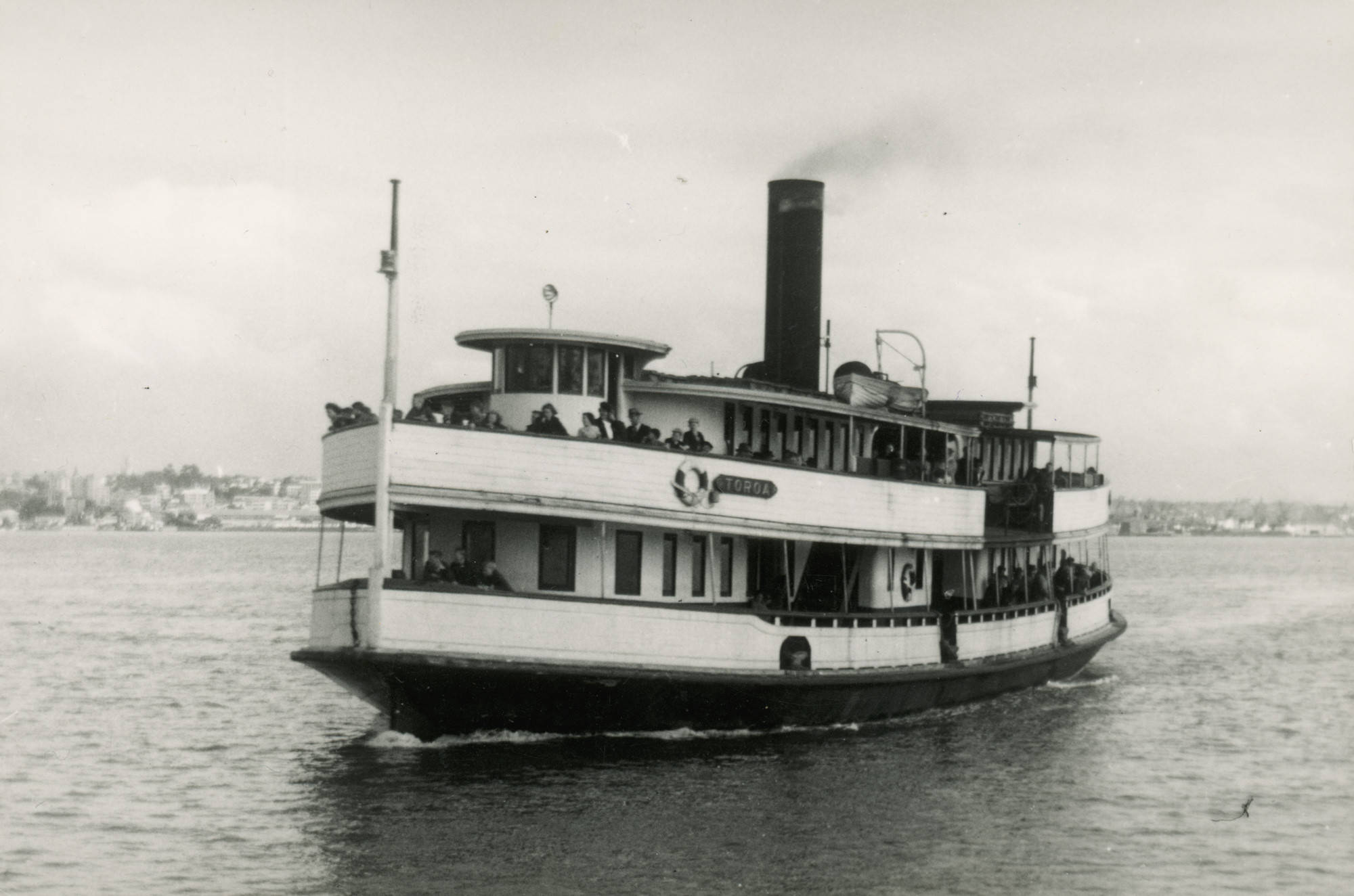
- The Toroa on the Waitematā Harbour in the 1950s

History
- Namesake: Northern royal albatross
- Owner: Devonport Steam Ferry Company Limited; New Zealand Maritime Trust
- Builder: George Niccol
- Laid down: 1924
- Launched: 28 April 1925
- In service: July 1925
- Out of service: 8 August 1980
- Status: Undergoing restoration

General characteristics
- Tonnage: 309 GT
- Length: 130.75 ft (39.85 m)
- Beam: 31.4 ft (9.6 m)
- Draft: 9.9 ft (3.0 m)
- Depth: 9.6 ft (2.9 m)
- Decks: 2
- Installed power: Aitchison, Blair Ltd Triple-expansion steam engine 51 horsepower (38 kW)
- Propulsion: Triple expansion steam engine
- Speed: 11.25 knots (20.84 km/h; 12.95 mph)
- Capacity: 1221 passengers river limits; 682 passengers extended river limits
- Crew: 4

Toroa is a steam-powered Albatross-class passenger ferry that served Auckland, New Zealand from 1925 to 1980 before being laid up. As of 2025 the vessel is being restored.

== History ==
Toroa was laid down in early 1924, and was launched on 28 April 1925, with Mrs J. Fotheringham giving her blessing to the ship. The ferry is named for the northern royal albatross. An official trial run to Browns Island (Motukorea) and back was completed on 6 July. Toroa entered service in July, primarily travelling between the Devonport and Auckland CBD ferry terminals with her sister ship Makora. The ferry is double-ended, with a propeller and wheelhouse at each end. At her peak, she carried about 20,000 passengers a day. After 55 years of service, she was laid up in 1980, and was set to be buried in land reclamation work at Westhaven along with ferries Korea, Makora, Takapuna, and The Peregrine.

However, the vessel was saved after being purchased by the New Zealand Maritime Trust. A volunteer group, the Toroa Preservation Society, has worked towards a restoration. Toroa was towed to Birkenhead wharf by the tug William C Daldy but sank in a storm there in 1998. She was raised on the second attempt, and brought ashore at Henderson in 2001. Restoration work was continuing slowly but regularly in 2010. Most of the steel framing of the vessel has had to be replaced, and both wheelhouses have been rebuilt. The timber planks on the hull are being replaced by a mix of old kauri and new macrocarpa. Some of the timber was sourced from trees from a Henderson park that was damaged in a cyclone.

The original steam engine is being restored. Following restoration, the boiler will be fueled by compressed wood waste instead of coal.

Other Albatross-class ferries include

- Albatross
- Kestrel
- The Peregrine
- Ngoiro
- Makora

== In popular culture ==
The Toroa was in the soap opera Shortland Street from 1993 to 1995. It was initially the residence of Gina Rossi and Leonard Dodds, and later Lionel Skeggins, Stuart Neilson, Guy Warner and Carmen Roberts, but not at the same time. Skeggins and Kirsty Knight got married on the vessel.
