= Geraldine Brophy =

New Zealand actress and playwright

Geraldine Mary Brophy (born 1961) is a New Zealand television, film and stage actress, theatre director and playwright.

== Biography ==
Brophy was born in Birmingham, England, to Irish parents, John and Marie Brophy. She and her family emigrated to New Zealand in 1972, when she was 12 years old. Educated at Sacred Heart College in Lower Hutt, she left school when she was 16 years old, and received her first professional acting role in 1983, at the Centrepoint Theatre in Palmerston North. The following year, she joined the Fortune Theatre company in Dunedin, and for ten years she was a core member of the Court Theatre company in Christchurch. She has also appeared for Downstage Theatre and Circa Theatre in Wellington, and the Auckland Theatre Company. In 2002, Brophy played the title role in the New Zealand Actors' Company production of Shakespeare's King Lear, Leah.

Brophy's first film appearance was in Fiona Samuel's film Home Movie in 1997, for which she won the New Zealand Film and Television Best Actress Award. After this role she was cast as the receptionist, Moira Crombie, in television soap opera Shortland Street, and played the character for four years. In the 2000s, Brophy appeared in television and film productions, including a season of Dancing with the Stars, during which she was injured and required surgery.

In 2003, Brophy began writing plays. Her first play was The Viagra Monologues, followed in 2004 by Mary’s Gospel and Confessions of a Chocoholic. She has also written Real Estate, The Paradise Package and The Merry Wives of Windsor Avenue, which was commissioned by Downstage and Centrepoint Theatres in 2008. Brophy and her daughter Beatrice Joblin co-wrote Ladies a Plate.

Brophy has also directed plays on stage. In 2007, she directed Finding Murdoch for Downstage Theatre, Doubt for the Court Theatre, and Wednesday to Come. The following year she directed Under Milk Wood for the Court Theatre.

In 2023, Brophy was presented with a Scroll of Honour from the Variety Artists Club of New Zealand for her services to entertainment.

== Screenography ==
=== Film ===
Year	Title	Role	Notes
2019	Births, Deaths & Marriages	Aunty Ngaire	
2017	Pork Pie	Andy	
2012	Eternity	Veronica	
2011	Hook, Line and Sinker	Bernadette	
2011	The Devil's Rock	Voice of the Demon	
2009	Underworld: Rise of the Lycans	Nobleman's Wife	
2008	Second Hand Wedding	Jill Rose	
2007	The Water Horse	Gracie	
2004	In My Father's Den	Det. Farnon	

=== Television ===
Years	Title	Role	Notes	Reference
2023	Little Apocalypse	Nanny	5 episodes	
2022	Wellington Paranormal	Pakeha Ghost (voice)	Episode: "Skeleton Crew"	
2021–2023	Under the Vines	Morag	2 episodes	
2019	The Brokenwood Mysteries	Elsa	Episode: "The Power of Steam"	
2014	How to Murder Your Wife	Betty Benning	TV movie	
2012	Siege	Kris McGehan	TV movie	
2009	Dancing with the Stars	Herself (contestant)		
2007	Welcome to Paradise	Despina	Episode: "Little Bo Peepshow"	
2007	Outrageous Fortune	Mrs Haggerty	Episode: "Bow Stubborn Knees"	
2005	Maddigan's Quest	Ida	Episode: "Hillfolk"	
2005–2006	Seven Periods with Mr Gormsby	Marion Patterson	8 episodes	
2005	The Insider's Guide to Love	Trish	3 episodes	
2004	Serial Killers	Sandy	Episode: "Product Placement"	
1997–2001	Shortland Street	Moira Crombie	25 episodes	
1997	Home Movie	Bridie		

== Awards and recognition ==
Year	Award	Category	Nominated for	Result	Notes
2015	New York City International Film Festival	Best Actress in a Supporting Role - Feature (Length) Film	How to Murder Your Wife	Won	
2008	Bruce Mason Playwriting Award			Short listed	
2008	Qantas Film and Television Awards	Best Actress - Film	Second-Hand Wedding	Won	
2000	New Zealand Film and Television Awards	Best Actress - Television	Shortland Street	Nominated	
1998	TV Guide Television Awards	Best Actress	Home Movie	Won	
1996	Chapman Tripp Award	Best Actress in a Supporting Role	Tzigane	Won	

== Personal life ==
Brophy is married to actor Ross Joblin and has two daughters. Their daughter Beatrice Joblin is a writer, director and producer.
