= Jodie Dorday =

New Zealand actress

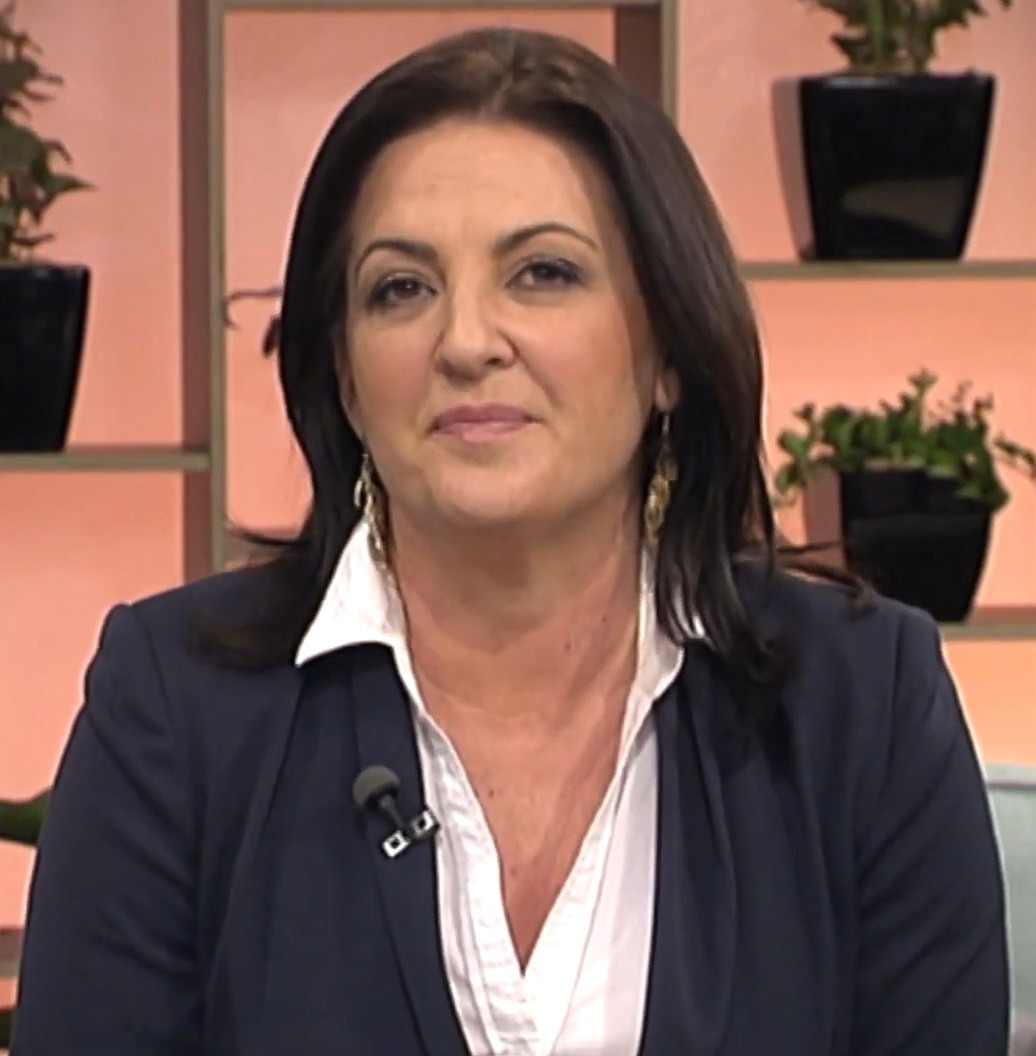
- Dorday in 2018
- Born: 4 January 1968 (age 58)
- Occupation: Actress
- Years active: 1995–present

Jodie Dorday is a New Zealand actress known for her work in television, film and theatre. Her television credits include Xena: Warrior Princess, Burying Brian (2008) and Westside. She won the Best Supporting Actress award at the 1999 Nokia New Zealand Film Awards for her performance in Via Satellite (1998).

== Filmography ==
Film and television
Year	Title	Role	Notes
1995	Xena: Warrior Princess	Io	Episode: "Prometheus"
1997	Xena: Warrior Princess	Solari	Episodes: "The Quest" and "A Necessary Evil"
1997	Shortland Street	Annabel Lustwick	TV series
1997	Home Movie	Lindsay	
1998	Xena: Warrior Princess	Bordello Girl No. 2	Episode: "Warrior... Priestess... Tramp"
1998	Market Forces	Amelia	TV series
1998	Via Satellite	Lyn	
1999	Hercules: The Legendary Journeys	Lucretiana	Episode: "Just Passing Through"
2000	Jack of All Trades	Kentucky Sue	Episode: "Once You Go Jack..."
2002	Blue Heelers	Sally Robbins	Episode: "The Last Jar"
2003	Calling Gerry Molloy	Andrea	
2008	Mark Loves Sharon	Maddison McGuire	Episode: "Night of Nights"; Episode: "Aftermath"; Episode: "You Can Pick Your Friends..."
2008	Burying Brian	Jodie Welch	TV series, 6 episodes
2016	Billy Elliot	Mrs Wilkinson	Musical Theatre, Auckland Theatre Company
2018	Westside	Trish Miller	
2020	Di and Viv and Rose	Viv	Play opened in Wellington at Circa Theatre, then toured to the Mayfair Theatre Dunedin

== Awards ==
- 1999 – Best Supporting Actress for Via Satellite
