= So You Wanna Be a Popstar (Dutch TV series) =

Dutch reality television series

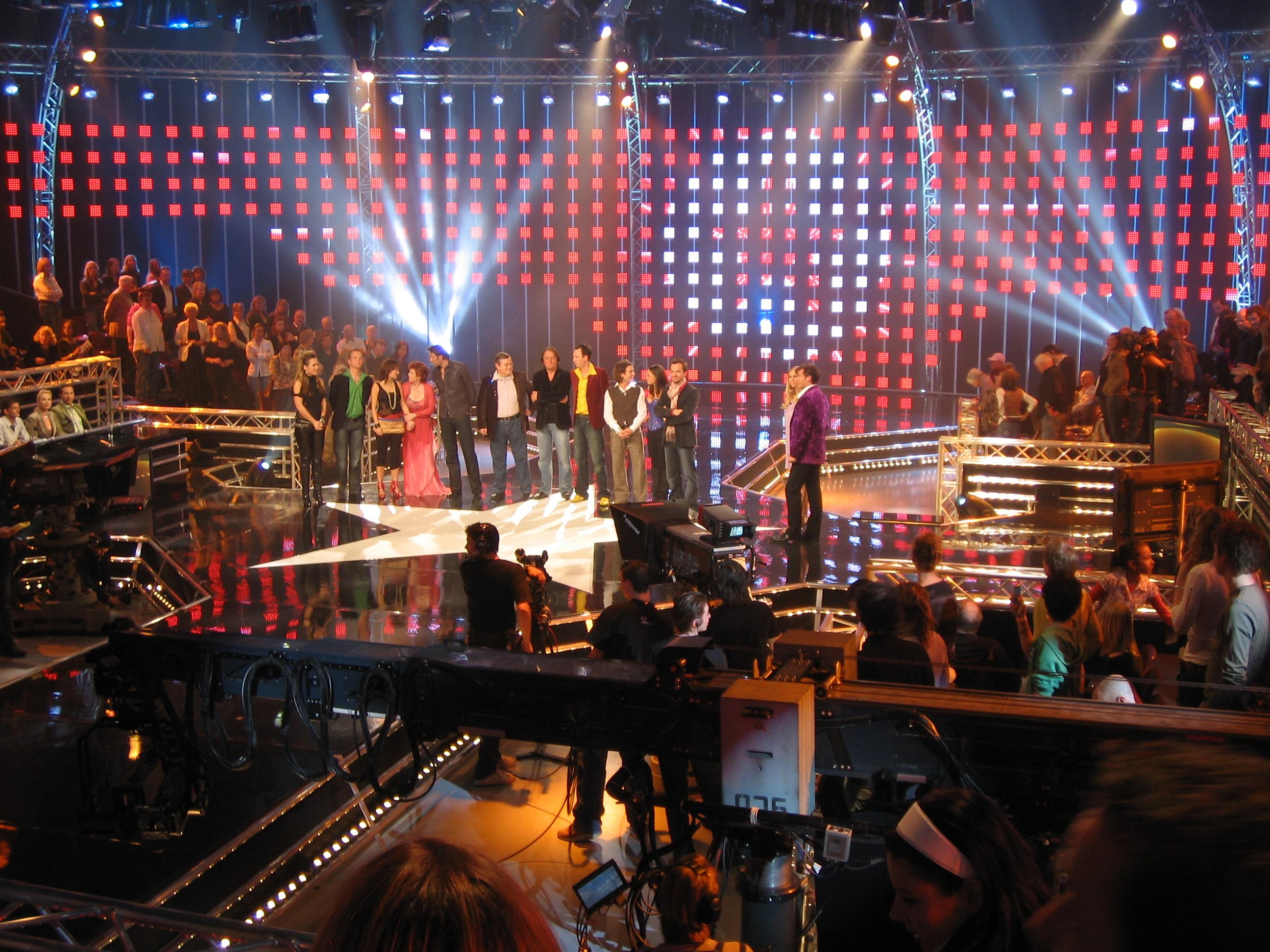
- In Studio 22 at the Mediapark during the first live broadcast of the latest SBS6 program.
- Starring: Gerard Joling (host); Nance Coolen (host)
- Country of origin: Netherlands

Production
- Production company: Eyeworks

Original release
- Network: SBS6
- Release: 2007

So You Wanna Be a Popstar is a Dutch celebrity karaoke reality series that pits celebrities against each other in front of a judging panel. It's based on the New Zealand format Popstars. It followed the success of Pop Idol.

== The Finalists ==
- Erik Hulzebosch (winner)
- Sascha Visser
- Viktor Brand
- Roxeanne Hazes
- Nelleke van der Krogt
- Geert Hoes
- Hilbrand Nawijn
- Jochem van Gelder
- Monique van der Werff
- Fajah Lourens
- Tanja Jess

== See also ==
- Popstars
- Popstars: The Rivals
- The Voice (franchise)
