= Greg Feeney =

- Shortland Street character
- Portrayed by: Tim Balme
- Duration: 1994–1996, 1999–2000
- First appearance: 9 February 1994
- Last appearance: 17 February 2000
- Introduced by: Tony Holden (1994); Gavin Strawhan (1995); Simon Bennett (1999)
In-universe information
- Occupation: Drug dealer Waiter
- Stepfather: Vic Roberts

Greg Feeney is a fictional character on the New Zealand soap opera Shortland Street, who was portrayed by Tim Balme for numerous recurring stints throughout the mid to late nineties.

The character arrived in early 1994 as the step brother to established character Carmen Roberts (Theresa Healey) and quickly took up the soap's badboy vacancy. A drug dealer and criminal, Greg was constantly in trouble, and causing it himself, helping harmless doctor, Chris Warner (Michael Galvin) get addicted to prescription drugs. The character would constantly appear and disappear for the 5 years following his first appearance, having a romance with Kirsty Knight (Angela Dotchin) for a majority of these stints. The character started an affair with bisexual nurse Caroline Buxton (Tandi Wright) in 1999 and ended up leaving the show in an iconic scene, with a pregnant Caroline into the sunset.

== Creation and casting ==
Greg was created as a love interest for established character, Kirsty Knight. Tim Balme auditioned and won the role, first appearing on screen in early 1994. Balme enjoyed the role and the confidence it gave him. After his contract had expired, he returned numerous times over the next 5 years to fulfill the characters storylines.

== Storylines ==
Greg arrived, displacing Guy (Craig Parker), who believed he had returned to woo ex-girlfriend Carmen (Theresa Healey) back. It was soon revealed Greg had become Carmen's step brother and he had arrived for help with his drug addiction. Greg got a job at "Kennedy's" and had a brief fling with Alex (Liddy Holloway) before moving on with Kirsty (Angela Dotchin). He dealt drugs to drug addict Chris Warner (Michael Galvin) and soon fled town, leaving Kirsty with an HIV scare. He returned however and the relationship resumed, shortly before he started an affair with Jo (Greer Robson) and the two left together.

Greg returned when he heard of Carmen's death. He started dating Kirsty once again when she suffered amnesia. However, early in the new year, Kirsty realized Greg was still a manipulative drug addict and they broke up. After beating up nurse Harry Martin (Dean O'Gorman) for trying to set Greg up in a burglary, Greg fled Ferndale.

Greg once again returned. He started to date Caroline (Tandi Wright) and scammed MacKenzie Choat (Ingrid Park) out of the thousands she stole from the clinic. He and Caroline broke up following the revelation he was a drug dealer. Greg once again fled town. He returned late in the year, having spent the money and getting into trouble with gangs. He got attacked and nearly died, resulting in Caroline returning to him and getting pregnant. The two left into the sunset.

== Reception ==
Since his departure Greg has become an iconic villain on the soap. His romance with Caroline has been described as one of Shortland Street's most memorable couples. Writer, Rachel Lang, thought Balme was perfect for the role, stating:"I was at the bank and there was this guy over at the counter and I thought, 'ooh he looks dodgy', he had that kind of look about him, he's quite a chameleon." A reviewer of the soap stated in 2000 that Greg should be brought back because he made the show addictive with his "badboy" ways. Balmes portrayal was so realistic, a pharmacist refused him service whilst he was on the show fearing he was drug seeking. In 2012, the character was named as one of the standout characters of the show's first 20 years. His final scene with Caroline has been voted by fans as one of the show's most iconic moments.
