= Blair Strang =

New Zealand actor

- Born: 15 March 1972 (age 54); New Zealand
- Occupation: Actor
- Years active: 1988–present
- Spouse: Katrina Devine (m. 2001, divorced)

Blair Strang (born 15 March 1972) is a New Zealand Māori actor. He is most noted for playing ambulance driver Rangi Heremaia on New Zealand's longest-running soap opera, Shortland Street, between 1995 and 2001 and Brian King on Nothing Trivial from 2011 to 2014.

== Early life ==
Born to a Pākehā father of Scottish descent and a Māori mother, he attended Saint Kentigern College, Pakuranga, where he was Head Prefect.

== Filmography ==
- Falling Inn Love – Anaaki
- Nothing Trivial – Brian King
- Kaitangata Twitch – Sebastian Cardwell
- Shortland Street – Rangi Heremaia
- Go Girls – Joseph
- Doves of War – Joe Matich
- Orange Roughies – D.S. Sean Parkes
- So You Wanna Be a Popstar? – a singer
- Power Rangers S.P.D. – Bork (voice)
- Maiden Voyage: Ocean Hijack – Enrique
- Deceit – Karl
- Mataku – Uncle Eru (Season 1 Episode 3: Going to War)
- Best Bits – Himself
- Happy Birthday 2 You – Paramedic Rangi Heremia
- Look Who's Famous Now – Himself
- Interrogation
- Homeland
- Power Rangers Dino Fury – Warden Carlos Garcia
- Choose Love – Dan
- Power Rangers Cosmic Fury – Warden Carlos Garcia

== Career ==
As well as Shortland Street, Strang has appeared in television dramas Doves of War (for TV3), Orange Roughies (TV 1), Interrogation (Prime TV), Go Girls and Nothing Trivial. He also made an appearance on So You Wanna be a Popstar?, hosted by Oliver Driver, and starring Katrina Hobbs, and regularly appears in a variety of roles as a guest star or extra.

He completed filming Māori Television's new family drama, Kaitangata Twitch, which is an adaptation of the children's book by author, Margaret Mahy. He has also completed a successful New Zealand tour of the theatre piece, Whero's New Net and co starred in the TV drama Nothing Trivial and Homeland.

He recently acted in the 2023 Netflix movie Choose Love in the role of Dan, boss of the main character.

== Personal life ==
He has an LLB from the University of Auckland, majoring in entertainment law, and is a practising family lawyer in Albany at North Shore Legal Chambers.

He married his former Shortland Street co-star Katrina Devine on 10 November 2001; the couple later divorced.

== Awards ==
In 2008, he won Metro magazine's "Outstanding Performance of the Year" award in a theatre piece with Massive Theatre Company called Whero's New Net.
