= Tandi Wright =

New Zealand actress

- Born: 4 May 1970 (age 56); Zambia
- Occupation: Actress
- Years active: 1995–present

Tandi Wright (born 4 May 1970) is a New Zealand actress. She first gained recognition for portraying Nurse Caroline Buxton on the long running New Zealand soap opera Shortland Street.

She is best known for her roles as Fenn Partington on Seven Periods with Mr Gormsby, Catherine Duvall on Nothing Trivial, and Ruth in Pearl.

She played a recurring role in 800 Words portraying the character Laura Turner.

== Early life and education ==
Wright was born in Zambia to New Zealander parents Vernon Wright and Dinah Priestley. She grew up in Wellington and attended Wellington High School and Victoria University of Wellington. She graduated from Toi Whakaari: New Zealand Drama School with a Diploma in Acting in 1994. Her father Vernon Wright, is a former journalist for "The Listener" who now lives in Zambia, and her mother Dinah is a writer and actress in Wellington. Wright has two sisters, Nicky (DOC policy advisor) and Justine (film editor), and two step sisters, Stephanie (information architect) and Victoria (teacher).

== Career ==
From 1995 to 2000, she appeared as Nurse Caroline Buxton in Shortland Street. Other roles include Power Rangers: S.P.D., Crash Palace, Out of the Blue, Seven Periods with Mr Gormsby, The Lost Children, Black Sheep and Legend of the Seeker.

In 2010, she played the role of Callie Ross, the wife of the main character, in This Is Not My Life. Her next major role followed in 2011–2014, as Dr Catherine Duvall on the TVNZ drama Nothing Trivial. She starred 2014 in the drama thriller series The Returned as Claire Winship.

Wright is vice president of the performers trade union Equity New Zealand.

== Personal life ==
Wright's husband Michael Beran is also an actor and they live in Auckland with their daughter, Olive.

== Filmography ==
=== Film ===
Year	Title	Role	Notes
1984	Iris	unknown	
1992	Absent Without Leave	Tom's Fiancée	
2002	This Is Not a Love Story	Studio Art Dept	
2003	Sylvia	2nd Woman at Ted Hughes' Lecture	
2004	Raising Waylon	Tina Stanfil	
2004	Not Only But Always	Julie Andrews	
2006	Black Sheep	Dr. Astrid Rush	
2006	Out of the Blue	Julie-Anne Bryson	
2009	Piece of My Heart	Chloe Morton	Morton ||
2011	Bliss	Lily Trowell	
2012	Kiwi Flyer	Karen	
2013	Jack the Giant Slayer	Queen	
2020	Love and Monsters	Joel's Mother	
2022	Pearl	Ruth	
2026	Evil Dead Burn	Susan Price	

=== Television ===
Year	Title	Role	Notes
1996	The Enid Blyton Adventure Series	Ingrid	Episode: "Ship of Adventure"
1995–2000	Shortland Street	Caroline Buxton	Main role
2000	Street Legal	Detective Senior Sergeant Angela Watson	Main role
2000	Xena: Warrior Princess	Sarah / Sonata	Episode: "Who's Gurkhan?"
2001	Crash Palace	Penny Watts	Main role
2001–2002	Being Eve	Alannah Lush	Main role
2003	Willy Nilly	Joy	Main role
2004	Serial Killers	Sally	Main role
2005	Power Rangers S.P.D.	Isinia Cruger	Main role
2005–2008	Seven Periods with Mr Gormsby	Fenn Partington	Main role
2006	The Lost Children	Charlotte Melville	Main role
2006	Maddigan's Quest	Timon's Mother	Episode: "Hillfolk"
2009–2010	Legend of the Seeker	Mord'Sith / Alina	3 episodes
2010	Outrageous Fortune	Mandy	Episode: "Let The Door Be Lock'd"
2010	This Is Not My Life	Callie Ross	Main role
2011–2014	Nothing Trivial	Catherine Duvall	Main role
2015	The Returned	Claire Winship	Main role
2015–2018	800 Words	Laura Turner	Recurring role
2021	Creamerie	Lane	Main role
