= Tim Balme =

New Zealand actor and screenwriter

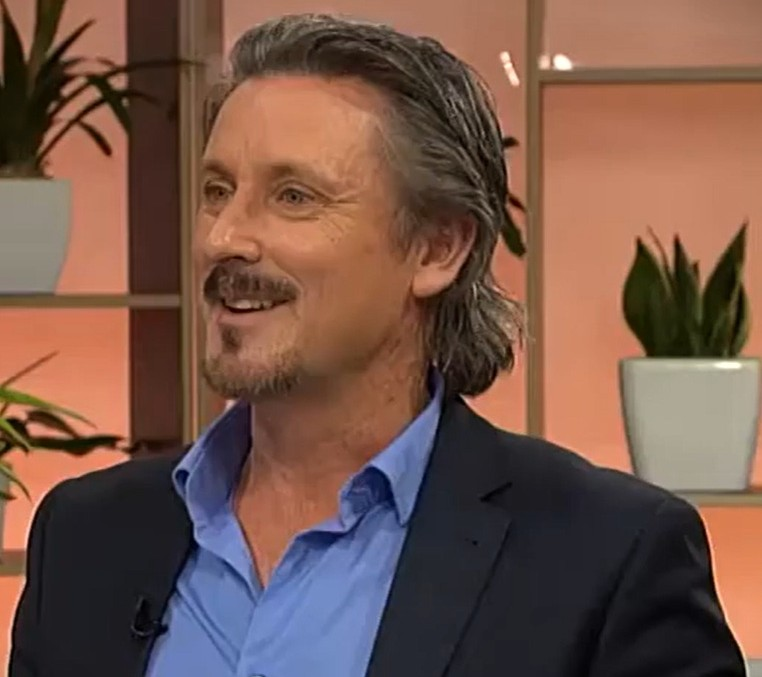
- Balme in 2017
- Born: Timothy Guy Balme; 18 January 1967 (age 59); New Zealand
- Occupation: Actor
- Years active: 1987–present
- Spouse: Katie Wolfe (m. 1994)
- Children: 3

Timothy Guy Balme (born 18 January 1967) is a New Zealand actor and screenwriter. He is best known for his roles on the long-running soap opera Shortland Street and Mercy Peak, as well as lead roles in the cult film Braindead and Jack Brown Genius. He was a writer and actor on the television series The Almighty Johnsons, and the creator and a writer for The Brokenwood Mysteries.

== Personal life ==
Balme is married to actress Katie Wolfe, with whom he has two children; daughter Edie (born 2001) and son Nīkau (born 2005). Balme also has a son, Sam (born 1987) from a previous relationship.

== Career ==
Balme graduated from Toi Whakaari in 1989, and his first lead role was in the 1992 film Braindead (aka Dead Alive). Balme and his wife, along with Simon Bennett and Robyn Malcolm, founded the New Zealand Actors' Company, which ran for three productions before being dissolved. An actor for the better part of twenty years, he has recently branched out into writing, and has scripted episodes for television series such as Diplomatic Immunity and Outrageous Fortune. Balme also wrote the short film Redemption, directed by his wife, which was selected as part of the short film line-up at the Sundance Film Festival for 2011.

Balme worked as the head of development for South Pacific Pictures for three years before returning to freelancing. He currently writes for shows such as the popular Channel 7 drama 800 Words and is head writer for the murder mystery series The Brokenwood Mysteries. In 2015 he won the Best Television Screenplay award at the SWANZ (NZ Writer's Guild Awards) for Brokenwood Ep 2 "Sour Grapes".

== Filmography ==
=== Film ===
Year	Title	Role	Notes
1992	Braindead	Lionel Cosgrove	
1994	Tin Box	Adam	
1994	The Last Tattoo	Jim Mitchell	
1994	La vie en rose	Priest	Short film
1996	Planet Man	Ant	Short film
1996	Headlong	Arthur	Short film
1996	Jack Brown Genius	Jack Brown	
1998	Via Satellite	Ken	
2001	Exposure	Brad	Video
2003	For Good	Grant Wilson	
2007	The Tattooist	Jake's Father	
2010	No Reason	Pathologist No. 1	

=== Television ===
Year	Title	Role	Notes
1990	Shark in the Park	Barry	"Diversions"
1991	Away Laughing	Various	TV series
1993	Marlin Bay	Hal Hayward	1 episode
1994	White Fang	Brubaker	"Movie Stars Among Themselves"
1994	Hercules in the Underworld	Lycastus	TV movie
1994–96	Shortland Street	Greg Feeney	TV series
1995	Coverstory	Nick Williams	1 episode
1998	The Legend of William Tell	Alum	Episode: "Combat"
1999	Shortland Street	Greg Feeney	TV series
1999	Give Us a Clue		1 episode
1999	Greenstone	Father Michael	TV series
2001–02	Mercy Peak	Ken Wilder	Main role
2002	The Vector File	Paul	TV movie
2004	Deceit	Kevin Ordell	TV movie
2004	Not Only But Always	NY Club Compere	TV movie
2004-05	P.E.T. Detectives	The Laughing Man	"Time After Time", "Science Teacher"
2006	Maddigan's Quest	Yves	Main role
2010	Outrageous Fortune	Quentin	"The Power to Seduce", "When Both Contend"
2011–12	Nothing Trivial	Jules	Recurring role
2011–13	The Almighty Johnsons	Mike Johnson	Lead role

=== Theatre ===
Year	Title	Playwright	Role	Company
1990	Ladies Night	Anthony McCarten & Stephen Sinclair	Craig	Australian Tour
1990–1995	Blue Sky Boys	Ken Duncum	Don Everly	
1991	Via Satellite	Anthony McCarten	Camerman	Circa Theatre
1992	Hang on a Minute Mate		Young Jack	Downstage Theatre
1993–1994	Let's Spend the Night Together		Rick	National Tour
1994	Ladies Night II – Raging On	Anthony McCarten & Stephen Sinclair	Craig	Mercury Theatre
1996	Hamlet	Shakespeare	Hamlet	Circa Theatre
1996	One Flesh	Fiona Samuel	Neil	Downstage Theatre
1997–2000	The Ballad of Jimmy Costello	Tim Balme	Jimmy Costello	National and International tour
1999	Much Ado About Nothing	Shakespeare	Benedick	Downstage Theatre
2000	A Midsummer Night's Dream	Shakespeare	Oberon / Theseus	NZ Actors Company
2002	Queen Leah		Regan	NZ Actors Company
2010	Horseplay		James K Baxter	Maidment Theatre
2017	Nell Gwynn	Jessica Swale	King Charles the second	Auckland Theatre Company

== Other work ==
=== Film ===
Title	Year	Credited as	Notes
Title	Year	Writer	Notes
Redemption	2010	Yes	Short film
White Lies	2013	No	Script development

=== Television ===
The numbers in writing credits refer to the number of episodes.

Title	Year	Credited as	Network	Notes
Title	Year	Writer	Network	Notes
Interrogation	2005	Yes (2)	Prime	
Outrageous Fortune	2006–10	Yes (21)	TV3	Storyliner (series 3: 7 episodes, series 4–6)
Wayne Anderson: Glory Days	2008	No	Prime	Script consultant
Diplomatic Immunity	2009	Yes (2)	TV One	
Stolen	2010	Screenplay	TV3	Television film
The Almighty Johnsons	2011–13	Yes (5)	TV3	Storyliner (series 3)
The Blue Rose	2013	No	TV3	Head of development (10 episodes); Storyliner (6 episodes)
The Brokenwood Mysteries	2014–present	Yes (21)	Prime; TVNZ 1	Script editor (series 1–3: 8 episodes); Co-producer (series 6: 1 episode); Producer (series 7)
800 Words	2015–17	Yes (6)	Seven Network; TVNZ 1	
The Sounds	2020	Yes (3)	Acorn TV; Neon	Storyliner
Under the Vines	2021	Yes (1)	Acorn TV; TVNZ 1	

== Awards and nominations ==
Year	Award	Category	Work	Result
1992	Fantafestival	Best Actor	Braindead	Won
1993	New Zealand Film and TV Awards	Best Male Dramatic Performance	Braindead	Won
1996	New Zealand Film and TV Awards	Best Actor	Jack Brown Genius	Won
2002	New Zealand Film and TV Awards	Best Supporting Actor	Mercy Peak	Won
2010	NZ Herald Best of Theatre Award		Horseplay	Won
