= 2024 New Zealand Television Awards =

- Awarded for: Excellence in New Zealand television
- Date: 22 November 2024
- Location: Auckland
- Country: New Zealand
- Hosted by: Pax Assadi

The New Zealand Television Awards for 2024 were held on 22 November 2024 at the Kiri Te Kanawa Theatre in Auckland, New Zealand. Comedian Pax Assadi hosted the event.

== Nominees and winners ==
Winners are listed first and highlighted in boldface.

Key
† – Non-technical award
‡ – Technical award

=== Television ===
NZ On Air Best Drama†	Best Comedy†
**After the Party – Helen Bowden, Liz DiFiore and Peter Salmon (TVNZ 1 / TVNZ+)**; Testify – Philippa Rennie and Sharlene George (TVNZ 2 / TVNZ+); Friends Like Her – Sarah-Kate Lynch, Philip Smith, Kathleen Anderson, Annabelle Lee-Mather and Steven Zanoski (Three / ThreeNow)	**The Motherhood Anthology – Give Me Babies – Ankita Singh, Calvin Sang and Briar Collard (TVNZ 2 / TVNZ+)**; Miles from Nowhere – Ahmed Osman, Gary Scott and Sam Wilton (Neon / Sky Open); Kid Sister – Emily Anderton (TVNZ+); 7 Days – Rob Brown and Thom Watts (Three / ThreeNow)
Best Factual Series†	NZ On Air Best Documentary†
**Escaping Utopia – Philippa Rennie and Natalie Malcon (TVNZ 1 / TVNZ+)**; Origins – Te Wakahuia Bernard, Tash Christie and Meg Douglas (TVNZ+); Black Coast Vanishings – Cass Avery and Nicola Smith (Three / ThreeNow)	**Family Faith Footy: A Pasifika Rugby Story – Adrian Stevanon, Jeremiah Tauamiti, Gregor Paul, Abba-Rose Vaiaoga-Ioasa and Philip Smith (TVNZ 1 / TVNZ+)**; Ruamata: It's More Than Hockey – Kereama Wright, Mahanga Pihama, Riria Morgan, Arthur Rasmussen, Peter Lee and Matua Houltham (RNZ); Hīkoi Speaking Our Truth – Whatanui Flavell (TVNZ 1 / TVNZ+)
Best Original Reality Series†	Best Current Affairs Programme†
**Down for Love – Season 2 – Rachel Jean (TVNZ 2 / TVNZ+)**; Cooks on Fire – Season 2 – Nick Ward, Brendan Dahill, Richard Fletcher and David Arlich (TVNZ 1 / TVNZ+); The Casketeers – Vivienne Wigby-Ngatai, Annabelle Lee-Mather and Philip Smith (TVNZ 1 / TVNZ+)	**Q+A with Jack Tame – Alex Braae and the Q+A team (TVNZ 1 / TVNZ+)**; Paddy Gower Has Issues – Warner Bros. Discovery (Three / ThreeNow); Sunday – The Final Episode – Sunday team (TVNZ 1 / TVNZ+); Newsroom Investigates with Melanie Reid – Newsroom.co.nz
NZ On Air Best Children's Programme†	Te Māngai Pāho Best Māori Programme†
**Kiri & Lou – Fiona Copland (Sky)**; Island of Mystery: Te Wā o Matariki – Andrea Kahukiwa; Fresh Fairytales 2 – Hope Papali’i and Eileen Lee; KEA Kids News – Luke Nola and Kendall Kanoa Kukahiko	**NZ Wars: Stories of Tauranga Moana – Mihingarangi Forbes and Annabelle Lee-Mather (RNZ / TVNZ+)**; Hīkoi Speaking Our Truth – Whatanui Flavell (TVNZ 1 / TVNZ+); Origins – Te Wakahuia Bernard, Tash Christie and Meg Douglas (TVNZ 1 / TVNZ+)
Te Māngai Pāho Best Reo Māori Programme†	NZ On Air Best Pasifika Programme†
**Te Karere – Nationwide Activation Day – Rapaera Tawhai and the Te Karere team (TVNZ 1 / TVNZ+)**; Waka Huia – Meg Douglas and Whatanui Flavell (TVNZ 1 / TVNZ+); Ruamata: It's More Than Hockey – Kereama Wright, Mahanga Pihama, Riria Morgan, Arthur Rasmussen, Peter Lee and Matua Houltham (RNZ)	**Family Faith Footy: A Pasifika Rugby Story – Adrian Stevanon, Jeremiah Tauamiti, Gregor Paul, Abba-Rose Vaiaoga-Ioasa and Philip Smith (TVNZ 1 / TVNZ+)**; Still Here – Ursula Grace Williams, Josh Yong and Torisse Laulu (TVNZ+); Untold Pacific History – Damon Fepulea'i and Tuki Laumea
Best News Coverage†	Best Sports Programme†
**1 News at Six – Cyclone Gabrielle – One Year On (TVNZ 1 / TVNZ+)**; Newshub – Auckland Shooting (Three / ThreeNow); 1 News at Six – Election Night (TVNZ 1 / TVNZ+)	**Ruamata: It's More Than Hockey – Kereama Wright, Mahanga Pihama, Riria Morgan, Arthur Rasmussen, Peter Lee and Matua Houltham (RNZ)**; All Blacks: In Their Own Words – James Gemmell, Tim Dale-Fuller and Jon Wild (NZR+); Relentless – Alex Bradshaw and Tara Durrant (TVNZ+)
Best Live Event Coverage†	Best Entertainment Programme†
**Anzac 2024 – Ngatapa Black, Wayne Leonard and Sean Murphy (Whakaata Māori / MĀORI+)**; Super Rugby Final 2024 – Blues v Chiefs – Marcus Kennedy, Mark Kearns and Will Meiklejohn (Sky Sport); Ngā Tohu Matariki o te Tau 2023 – Ngatapa Black (Whakaata Māori / MĀORI+); Ngā Kapa Haka Kura Tuarua o Aotearoa – Ngatapa Black, Kereti Rautangata and Kororia Taumaunu (Whakaata Māori / MĀORI+)	**New Zealand Today – Bronwynn Bakker, Guy Williams, Matt Cooke and Cam Bakker (Three / ThreeNow)**; Code – The Reunion – Joe Whitehead and Bailey Mackey (Whakaata Māori / MĀORI+); Taskmaster NZ – Cam Bakker and Bronwynn Bakker (TVNZ 2 / TVNZ+)
Best Director: Documentary/Factual†	Screen Auckland Best Director: Drama / Comedy Drama†
**Sophie Musgrove and Siddharth Nambiar, Dynamic Planet (Neon / Sky Open / Sky Go)**; Laurie Clarke, Our Country's Shame; Natalie Malcon, Justin Pemberton and Britta Hawkins, Escaping Utopia (TVNZ 1 / TVNZ+); Megan Jones and Candida Beveridge, Black Coast Vanishings (Three / ThreeNow)	**Peter Salmon, After the Party (TVNZ 1 / TVNZ+)**; Calvin Sang, The Motherhood Anthology – Give Me Babies (TVNZ 2 / TVNZ+); The 8 Pan-Asian Women Directors of Kāinga, Kāinga (RNZ); David White, Far North (Three / ThreeNow)
Best Actress†	Best Supporting Actress†
**Robyn Malcolm, After the Party (TVNZ 1 / TVNZ+)**; Bree Peters, Spinal Destination (Sky); Chelsie Preston Crayford, Dark City: The Cleaner (Neon / Sky Open); Morgana O'Reilly, Friends Like Her (Three / ThreeNow)	**Tara Canton, After the Party (TVNZ 1 / TVNZ+)**; Tess Haubrich, Friends Like Her (Three / ThreeNow); Awa Puna, The Boy, the Queen, and Everything in Between (TVNZ+); Roxie Mohebbi, Miles from Nowhere (Neon / Sky Open)
Best Actor†	Best Supporting Actor†
**Peter Mullan, After the Party (TVNZ 1 / TVNZ+)**; Cohen Holloway, Dark City: The Cleaner (Neon / Sky Open); Temuera Morrison, Far North (Three / ThreeNow)	**Elz Carrad, After the Party (TVNZ 1 / TVNZ+)**; Jarod Rawiri, Friends Like Her (Three / ThreeNow); Jay Ryan, Creamerie – Season 2 (TVNZ 2 / TVNZ+)
Reporter of the Year†	Best Presenter: Entertainment†
**Lisette Reymer, Newshub (Three / ThreeNow)**; Alexa Cook, Newshub (Three / ThreeNow); Michael Morrah, Newshub (Three / ThreeNow)	**Karen O'Leary, Paddy Gower Has Issues (Three / ThreeNow)**; Guy Williams, New Zealand Today (Three / ThreeNow); Dave Letele, Heavyweight with Dave Letele (TVNZ+); Jeremy Wells and Paul Williams, Taskmaster NZ (TVNZ 2 / TVNZ+)
Best Presenter: News and Current Affairs†	Television Personality of the Year†
**Jack Tame, Q+A with Jack Tame (TVNZ 1 / TVNZ+)**; Julian Wilcox, The Hui (Three / ThreeNow); Guyon Espiner, with Guyon Espiner (RNZ); Paddy Gower, Paddy Gower Has Issues (Three / ThreeNow)	**Bella Kalolo, Shortland Street (TVNZ 2 / TVNZ+)**; Paddy Gower, Paddy Gower Has Issues (Three / ThreeNow); James Mustapic, Celebrity Treasure Island NZ – Season 7 (TVNZ 2 / TVNZ+); Melissa Chan-Green, AM (Three / ThreeNow); Paul Williams, Taskmaster – Season 4 (TVNZ 2 / TVNZ+); Turia Schmidt-Peke, Ahikāroa – Season 6 (Whakaata Māori / MĀORI+); Tāmati Rimene-Sproat, Hīkoi: Speaking Our Truth (TVNZ 1 / TVNZ+); Bubbah Olo, I Got You – Season 2 (RNZ); Paul Henry, The Traitors – Season 1 (Three / ThreeNow); Rikki Swannell, Rugby World Cup 2023 (Sky)
Television Legend†	
**Dame Julie Christie**	
Best Editing: Documentary / Factual‡	Best Editing: Drama / Comedy Drama‡
**Tori Bindoff and Carl Budden, Escaping Utopia (TVNZ 1 / TVNZ+)**; Margot Francis and James Brown, Black Coast Vanishings (Three / ThreeNow); Toby Longbottom, The Long Game; Chris Anderton, NZ Wars: Stories of Tauranga Moana (RNZ / TVNZ+)	**Denise Haratzis, After the Party (TVNZ 1 / TVNZ+)**; Allanah Bazzard, Dark City: The Cleaner (Neon / Sky Open); Eric de Beus, Testify (TVNZ 2 / TVNZ+)
Best Camerawork: Documentary or Factual‡	Best Director: Multi-Camera‡
**Mark Chamberlin, The Hui (Three / ThreeNow)**; Chris Watkins, WTF is Crypto? (TVNZ+); Dean Cornish and Mark Russell, Troy Kingi's Desert Hīkoi (TVNZ+)	**Matt Quin, NRL playoffs – Warriors v Knights (Sky Sport)**; Matt Barrett, Anzac 2024 (Whakaata Māori); Marcus Kennedy, The Rugby Championship – All Blacks v South Africa (Sky Sport); Mark Kearns, Super Rugby Final 2024 – Blues v Chiefs (Sky Sport)
Images & Sound Best Cinematography: Drama / Comedy Drama‡	Best Contribution to a Soundtrack‡
**Dave Cameron NZCS ACS, After the Party (TVNZ 1 / TVNZ+)**; Simon Tutty, Testify (TVNZ 2 / TVNZ+); Adam Luxton, Far North (Three / ThreeNow)	**Pinnacle Post Sound Team, Our Flag Means Death – Season 2 (Neon / Sky Open)**; Tom Miskin, Alan Kidd, Mike Bayliss and Steve Finnigan, Far North (Three / ThreeNow); Bruce Langley, Dark City: The Cleaner (Neon / Sky Open)
Images & Sound Best Original Score‡	Best Post Production Design‡
**Andrew Keoghan and Reb Fountain, Escaping Utopia (TVNZ 1 / TVNZ+)**; Karl Sölve Steven and Rob Thorne, Black Coast Vanishings (Three / ThreeNow); Moniker, Far North (Three / ThreeNow)	**Alana Cotton, Testify (TVNZ 2 / TVNZ+)**; Erin Woolhouse, The Motherhood Anthology – Give Me Babies (TVNZ 2 / TVNZ+); Jemma Lee, Motherhood – Ahi and the Stars (TVNZ 2 / TVNZ+)
Best Production Design‡	Best Costume Design‡
**Neville Stevenson, Dark City: The Cleaner (Neon / Sky Open)**; Andy Currie, The Motherhood Anthology – Give Me Babies (TVNZ 2 / TVNZ+); Melissa Spicer, After the Party (TVNZ 1 / TVNZ+); Riria Lee, Kāinga (RNZ)	**Briar Vivian, Far North (Three / ThreeNow)**; Sarah Aldridge, Testify (TVNZ 2 / TVNZ+); Briar Vivian, Miles from Nowhere (Neon / Sky Open)
Best Makeup Design‡	Best Script: Comedy†
**Janene Cissi, The Boy, the Queen, and Everything in Between (TVNZ 2 / TVNZ+)**; Maya Bailey, Far North (Three / ThreeNow); Joseph Kalepo and Andrew Kalepo, Motherhood (TVNZ 2 / TVNZ+)	**Simone Nathan, Kid Sister (TVNZ+)**; Pax Assadi, Raised by Refugees – Season 2 (Sky Open); Mohamed Hassan, Miles from Nowhere (Neon / Sky Open)
Best Script: Drama†	
**Dianne Taylor, After the Party (TVNZ 1 / TVNZ+)**; Paul Cleave, Dark City: The Cleaner (Neon / Sky Open); Sarah-Kate Lynch, Friends Like Her (Three / ThreeNow)	
