= List of Shortland Street characters introduced in 1997 =

The following is a list of characters that first appeared in the New Zealand soap opera Shortland Street in 1997, by order of first appearance.

== Joy Kwan ==
Joy Kwan
- Shortland Street character
- Portrayed by: Helene Wong
- Duration: 1997
- First appearance: 23 January 1997; Episode 1174
- Last appearance: 11 February 1997; Episode 1187
- Introduced by: Judith Trye
In-universe information
- Sons: Justin Kwan
- Daughters: Grace Kwan

Joy Kwan appeared in a guest stint at the start of 1997, interfering in the relationship between her daughter Grace Kwan (Lynette Forday) and Lionel Skeggins (John Leigh). Joy arrived in Ferndale from Hamilton on a shopping trip for presents for her son’s impending wedding in Perth. Joy quickly detected that Lionel still had feelings for his ex-wife Kirsty (Angela Dotchin) and forced him to take a romantic holiday with Grace to propel their relationship. Lionel returned from the trip committed to Grace. Seeing her daughter happy, Joy returned to Hamilton to continue preparations for the wedding.

== Dan Winchester ==
Dan Winchester
- Shortland Street character
- Portrayed by: Frank Edwards
- Duration: 1997
- First appearance: 10 March 1997; Episode 1206
- Last appearance: 16 June 1997; Episode 1276
- Introduced by: Judith Trye
In-universe information
- Occupation: Ambulance Officer
- Wife: Margaret Winchester

Dan Winchester was a reoccurring character in early to mid-1997, introduced as the latest ambulance partner for Rebecca Frost (Louisa Burgess). An experienced and senior paramedic, Dan took a quick dislike to Rebecca’s work ethic because of her faith. Rebecca soon learned that Dan’s wife had lost their money to a religious movement that pandered to her hypochondria. Liz Stokes (Irene Woods) befriended Dan’s wife Margaret (Maggie Maxwell) and suspected that Margaret’s symptoms were from unmanaged Type 2 diabetes. Dan was devastated when Margaret was diagnosed with both undiagnosed Type 2 diabetes and advanced pancreatic cancer. Liz moved in with the Winchesters and helped nurse Margaret in her final months. Dan developed feelings for Liz and once Margaret died, the pair embarked on a trip to England together.

== Gus Van Den Berg ==
Gus Van Den Berg
- Shortland Street character
- Portrayed by: Aaron Devitt
- Duration: 1997
- First appearance: 24 March 1997; Episode 1216
- Last appearance: 29 April 1997; Episode 1242
- Introduced by: Judith Trye
In-universe information
- Occupation: Doctor

Dr Gus Van Den Berg joined the clinic as a locum registrar general practitioner and an old friend of Nurse Cameron Scott (Glen Drake). Gus caught the eye of Kirsty Knight (Angela Dotchin) during his job interview and two began to date whilst also pursuing Rachel McKenna (Angela Bloomfield), taking advantage of her alcoholism. Cameron became suspicious of Gus’s manipulative nature. Rachel confessed to their affair to Kirsty and also forced Gus’s hand. Rejected by Kirsty and too challenged by Rachel, Gus fled Ferndale on the morning of Rebecca’s funeral.

== Kate Dryden ==
Kate Dryden
- Shortland Street character
- Portrayed by: Carol Smith
- Duration: 1997
- First appearance: 31 March 1997; Episode 1221
- Last appearance: 13 June 1997; Episode 1275
- Introduced by: Judith Trye
In-universe information
- Occupation: Doctor

Dr Kate Dryden was recruited to be the in-house gynaecologist for Jenny Harrison’s (Maggie Harper) Women’s Clinic. After some initial awkward encounters with Nick Harrison (Karl Burnett), including hitting him with her car, the pair began to date. Kate’s research and reputation quickly had a negative impact on the Women’s Clinic and Jenny was forced to let Kate go. Realising Nick was more immature than she first appreciated, Kate broke up with him. After helping Ellen Crozier (Robyn Malcolm) birth Rose at Central Hospital, Kate was not seen again.

== Moira Crombie ==
Moira Dawn Crombie (previously Lafferty, later Cochrane) was the matriarch of the Crombie family unit and main clinic receptionist from 1997-2001, portrayed by Geraldine Brophy. Moria joined the clinic with a shady past, replacing Rangi Heremaia (Blair Strang) on reception. The character was axed as part of a large cast cull and show revamp, leaving the show in April 2001.

== Awhina Broughton ==
Awhina Broughton
- Shortland Street character
- Portrayed by: Miriama Smith
- Duration: 1997-1998
- First appearance: 2 June 1997; Episode 1266
- Last appearance: 10 April 1998; Episode 1465
- Introduced by: Judith Trye
In-universe information
- Occupation: Nurse
- Father: Tamahae Broughton
- Mother: Kiri Broughton
- Uncles: Joe Bennett
- Aunts: Tui Heremaia; Hana Heremaia
- First cousins: Rangi Heremaia
- Other relatives: Toka Heremaia; Natasha Heremaia

Nurse Awhina Broughton was introduced in mid-1997 as an agency nurse working at the clinic. Advice from former nurse Ana (Mary Los’e) initially made Awhina reluctant to stay beyond her first shift, however was soon talked around by her cousin Rangi Heremaia (Blair Strang) and quickly accepted a permanent contract following the departure of Liz Stokes (Irene Wood). Despite being new to nursing and her rural upbringing, Awhina showed she was not easily phased by the demands of the job, volunteering to nurse a gang leader. Later in the year she helped Kirsty (Angela Dotchin) track down Rangi’s father.

Awhina immediately caught the eyes of fellow nurse Cameron Scott (Glenn Drake) and schoolboy James Thornton (Chris Dykzeul). Unbeknownst to the males, Awhina had a long term boyfriend Lee (Kirk Torrance) up north. Lee arrived in Ferndale in the spring time and Awhina planned to move in with him, much to the horror of Rangi. Cameron soon deduced that Lee was also a drug dealer and when confronted with the fact that drug money had paid for her nursing education, Awhina broke up Lee and started a relationship with Cameron. Her relationship with Cameron was short lived, as she realised that he will always have unrequited feelings for his flatmate Rachel McKenna (Angela Bloomfield).

In early 1998, Awhina started dating James - now a university student and working at the clinic as an orderly. Awhina started teaching James more about Māori culture, resulting in James convincing hospital management to reestablish having a Whanau Room. James quickly overly imposed himself upon Awhina and her housemates and the pair broke up. Lee returned to Ferndale in April, seemingly reformed and more committed to their Māori culture and working with a rehabilitation foundation. After doing some digging James revealed that Lee’s work with the foundation was court ordered and whilst initially angry, Awhina believed that Lee had genuinely reformed and left Ferndale with him.

Awhina was written out of the show in 1998 as the actress portraying her wanted to pursue other goals and find herself.

== Rose Crozier-Kearney ==
Rose Crozier-Kearney
- Shortland Street character
- Portrayed by: Georgia Knight
- Duration: 1997-1998
- First appearance: 16 June 1997; Episode 1276
- Last appearance: 3 February 1998; Episode 1417
- Introduced by: Judith Trye
In-universe information
- Father: David Kearney
- Mother: Ellen Crozier
- Brothers: Sean Kearney; Fergus Kearney
- Sisters: Minnie Crozier
- Grandmothers: Glenys Crozier
- Aunts: Liz Stokes; Carla Crozier
- First cousins: Anne Stokes; Robert Stokes

Rose Crozier-Kearney was the daughter born in mid-1997 to established characters Ellen Crozier (Robyn Malcolm) and David Kearney (Peter Elliott). Rose was introduced with the ultimate intention of her dying as part of a cot death storyline that occurred in a February 1998.

== Susie Hunter ==
Susie Hunter
- Shortland Street character
- Portrayed by: Janine Burchett
- Duration: 1997
- First appearance: 17 June 1997; Episode 1277
- Last appearance: 27 June 1997; Episode 1285
- Introduced by: Judith Trye
In-universe information
- Occupation: Nurse

Nurse Susan (Susie) Hunter was introduced for a guest stint during mid-1997. Susie arrived in Ferndale to see old nursing friend Ellen Crozier (Robyn Malcolm) following the of birth Rose (Georgia Knight). Susie was also reunited with Cameron Scott (Glen Drake) who had met during a recent nursing conference in Dunedin. Cameron was less keen to pick up where they had left off, with Susie quickly moving on to Johnny Marinovich (Stelios Yiakmis). It soon became apparent that Susie was not well and had taken herself off her medication for Bipolar disorder. Susie had framed Awhina (Miriama Smith) for stealing a patient’s jewellery, housemates Kirsty (Angela Dotchin) and Caroline (Tandi Wright) discovered Susie was planning a wedding to Johnny, and her boss Tiffany (Allison James) found Susie trying to inject a patient with disinfectant cleaning products. Following a confrontation with Tiffany in the supply room, Susie was taken to a mental health facility for mandatory assessment and treatment.

== Curtis Thompson ==
Curtis Thompson
- Shortland Street character
- Portrayed by: Scott Michaelson
- Duration: 1997
- First appearance: 24 June 1997; Episode 1282
- Last appearance: 6 August 1997; Episode 1313
- Introduced by: Judith Trye
In-universe information
- Occupation: Ambulance Officer

Curtis Thompson was the Australian ambulance partner for Rangi Heremaia (Blair Strang) following the departure of Dan Winchester. Curtis was a capable paramedic with a background in helicopter rescue. On his first day, Rachel McKenna (Angela Bloomfield) caught his eye, and the pair soon bonded over their common problems with alcohol. Curtis soon resumed drinking but quickly spiralled when he became suspicious of the relationship between Rachel and Cameron Scott (Glenn Drake). After attending a call out to a car accident whilst drunk and administering the wrong drugs, Rangi reported him to the Ambulance Service. Curtis was placed on extended leave with a condition for his return being commitment to an alcohol recovery group permanently. Both Rangi and Rachel doubted he would be able to meet that condition.

== Marion Seymour ==
Marion Seymour
- Shortland Street character
- Portrayed by: Dinah Priestley
- Duration: 1997
- First appearance: 26 June 1997; Episode 1284
- Last appearance: 11 July 1997; Episode 1295
- Introduced by: Judith Trye
In-universe information
- Other names: Marion Daniels (maiden name)
- Brothers: Peter Daniels
- Husband: Alfred Seymour (until 1960s)
- Sons: Ian Seymour
- Daughters: Margaret Seymour

Marion Seymour (also Daniels) appeared in a guest stint in 1997. She first appeared in mid-1997 helping her son Ian (David Press) secure a better deal for the clinic’s insurance. After meeting Ian’s partner Jenny (Maggie Harper), Marion pressured Jenny to break up with Ian as she felt Jenny was too old have children. Marion was determined for Ian to have kids to continue the Seymour empire as her daughter Margaret was unable to do so due to her sexuality. Marion threaten to disinherit Ian and spend her children’s inheritance on a dedicated children’s wing at Shortland Street. Ian soon discovered his mother had underlying health issues and on the evening prior to her signing the paperwork to dedicate the wing, engaged his mother in an argument that resulted in her having a heart attack. Realising that his mother had deduced his long term scheme to take over the clinic, Ian made no attempt to save Marion.

== Margaret Seymour ==
Margaret Seymour
- Shortland Street character
- Portrayed by: Amanda Rees
- Duration: 1997
- First appearance: 16 July 1997; Episode 1298
- Last appearance: 24 July 1997; Episode 1304
- Introduced by: Tony Holden
In-universe information
- Father: Alfred Seymour
- Mother: Marion Seymour
- Brothers: Ian Seymour
- Uncles: Peter Daniels

Margaret Seymour appeared in a guest stint in 1997. Whilst previously mentioned in 1996 as a potential backer for Jenny Harrison’s (Maggie Harper) Women’s Clinic, Margaret didn’t debut until mid-1997 following the death of her mother. Margaret was going to be disinherited due to being a lesbian and unable to provide a grandchild for her mother. Margaret stayed in Ferndale to witness Ian’s wedding to Jenny before returning to Australia.

== Frank Malone ==
Frank Malone
- Shortland Street character
- Portrayed by: Chris Hobbs
- Duration: 1997-2001
- First appearance: 31 July 1997; Episode 1309
- Last appearance: Early 2001
- Introduced by: Tony Holden
In-universe information
- Occupation: Neurosurgeon; Doctor at Shortland Street Hospital (1997-2001)

Dr Francis “Frank” Malone was introduced in mid-1997 as an award winning neurosurgeon, who was running a free community clinic from his home. Frank was known for his disdain of the private health system and was reluctant to take up Grace Kwan’s (Lynette Forday) offer to join the Shortland St Clinic. Frank eventually incorporated his community clinic into Shortland Street’s operations whilst also working as a surgeon for them, eventually becoming the 2IC for David Kearney (Peter Elliott) and his successor (Sofia Martinez) (Lena Cruz) whom Frank frequently clashed with.

Frank was written out of the show in 2001 as part of a large cast overhaul.

== Donna Heka ==
Donna Heka (also Bennett) was introduced as a potential love interest and latest ambulance partner for established character Rangi Heremaia (Blair Strang). Donna became one of the show's longest running characters. Storylines for Donna included her potential incest with Rangi, being framed for murder, suffering a mental breakdown and kidnapping baby Harry Warner, helping clear Victor Kahu (Calvin Tuteao) of murder, and becoming Chris Warner's (Michael Galvin) mistress. Donna was portrayed by Stephanie Tauevihi from 1997 to 2004.
