= List of Shortland Street characters introduced in 1995 =

The following is a list of characters that first appeared in the New Zealand soap opera Shortland Street in 1995, by order of first appearance.

== Bernie Leach ==
Bernie Leach
- Shortland Street character
- Portrayed by: Timothy Bartlett
- Duration: 1995-1996
- First appearance: 19 January 1995; Episode 679
- Last appearance: 10 April 1996; Episode 1001
- Introduced by: Gavin Strawhan
In-universe information
- Occupation: Businessman
- Brothers: Dr Billy Leach
- Wife: Carla Crozier (1995-1996)

Bernie Leach first appeared in early 1995 as a voice in a television advertisement promoting his business Bernie’s Bargain Bazaar, mocked by nurses Ellen Crozier (Robyn Malcolm) and Carmen Roberts (Theresa Healey). Later that week Ellen rescued Bernie from drowning at the beach. The pair ended up in a short relationship. His younger brother Billy (Darren Young) soon joined the clinic as a doctor.

Ellen was shocked when her sister Carla (Elisabeth Easther) began to date Bernie. The two soon eloped in what appeared to be an already unhappy marriage. The relationship continued to grow toxic due to his alcoholism and her manipulative manner. To ensure he would not leave her, Carla faked a pregnancy and subsequently a miscarriage after a minor car-crash whilst teaching her niece Minnie Crozier (Katrina Devine) to drive. When Ellen reveals to Bernie that Carla was unable to have children since her teenage years and thus had been lying, he angrily assaulted her and was arrested; Carla went to stay with her mother. When Bernie returned after being acquitted of assault, Carla promised herself that she would divorce him and take all his money. The two were injured when an earthquake hit Ferndale and a bloodied Bernie insulted Carla, resulting in her battering him to death with a candlestick, framing the scene to look like a casualty from the quake. Bernie’s death was the first onscreen murder on the show.

== Tiffany Pratt ==
Nurse Tiffany Marinovich (formerly Pratt and Warner) was introduced as a controversial appointment by, and as a potential love interest for, acting clinic director Chris Warner (Michael Galvin) in late January 1995. Tiffany was portrayed by Alison James until 1998 when the character’s life support is turned off following a fall leaving her brain dead, and the birth of her daughter Maria.

== Lulu Chatfield ==
Lulu Chatfield
- Shortland Street character
- Portrayed by: Meighan Desmond
- Duration: 1995–96
- First appearance: 25 January 1995; Episode 683
- Last appearance: 1996
- Introduced by: Gavin Strawhan
In-universe information
- Father: Andrew Chatfield
- Mother: Faye Chatfield

Louise “Lulu” Chatfield first arrived in early 1995, having become good friends with Stuart Neilson (Martin Henderson) after his short holiday away from Ferndale. It was soon revealed Lulu was a self-harming, teenage runaway, having been sexually abused by her father Andrew (Geoffrey Snell). Stuart's mother Marj (Elizabeth McRae) fostered Lulu alongside her husband Laurie (Chich Littlewood) and Lulu became good friends with Minnie Crozier (Katrina Devine). Lulu began to date James Thornton (Chris Dykzeul) but was devastated when her father was acquitted of his charges of molestation and tried to hunt her down. He was arrested and Lulu broke up with James when he kissed Minnie. In 1996 Lulu departed with Marj and Laurie to live in Wellington.

== Billy Leach ==
Billy Leach
- Shortland Street character
- Portrayed by: Darren Young
- Duration: 1995
- First appearance: 2 March 1995; Episode 709
- Last appearance: 25 August 1995; Episode 834
- Introduced by: Gavin Strawhan
In-universe information
- Occupation: Doctor
- Family: Leach
- Brothers: Bernie Leach

Dr Billy Leach was a major reoccurring character featured across the middle of 1995, introduced as the adopted brother of Bernie Leach (Timothy Bartlett) and ended up in a love triangle with nurse Tiffany Pratt (Alison James) and Dr Chris Warner (Michael Galvin).

Billy first appeared as a blind date for Grace Kwan (Lynette Forday) set up by her friend Ellen Crozier (Robyn Malcolm) who was dating Billy’s brother Bernie. Orphaned at the age of eight, Billy ended up being raised and financially supported by Bernie. Billy was working as a second year house surgeon in Central Hospital’s renal unit. Grace was instantly attracted and soon arranged for Billy to work as a locum at Shortland Street. Meanwhile Billy had developed a crush on Grace’s flatmate Tiffany Pratt.

Tiffany learned that Billy was working extra shifts at Central, which was in violation of his contract at Shortland Street. The situation came to a head when Billy misdiagnosed Lucy Darby's symptoms of illness as merely being a case of the flu and then left the clinic understaffed by going to work a shift at Central. That night a gravely ill Lucy was rushed to the clinic where Grace diagnosed Lucy with meningitis. After learning that Lucy had almost died because of him, Billy quit his job at Central and increased his work at Shortland Street.

Tiffany and Billy became engaged, but their happiness was short-lived when Tiffany was diagnosed with Hepatitis C. Tiffany believed that she had contracted the disease when she had a needle stick injury. Billy then learned that a medical school friend had contracted Hepatitis C and possibly passed it on to him when they share needles whilst doing drugs together. Billy had himself tested and learned that he too had the disease. Not wanting to risk his relationship with Tiffany, Billy allowed Tiffany to think she was the one who had passed it onto him. Billy’s sister-in-law Carla (Elisabeth Easther) had been causing tension between Bernie and Billy, and a long running vendetta against Tiffany. Carla discovered the truth of Billy’s diagnosis and began blackmailing Billy into taking Tiffany away from Ferndale permanently, or she would tell Tiffany the full story. However, Chris revealed the information instead, causing Billy to skip town for good.

== Rangi Heremaia ==
Te Rangitahi "Rangi" Heremaia was portrayed by Blair Strang between 1995 and 2001, with a brief non-canonical cameo as part of 30th anniversary in 2022. Rangi was introduced as a new paramedic partner for Sam Aleni (Rene Naufahu) and known for his relationships with Rachel McKenna (Angela Bloomfield), Rebecca Frost (Luisa Burgess), and Donna Heka (Stephanie Tauevihi). The actor left following a large cast overhaul in 2001, with Rangi written off in a whodunit storyline that saw his body discovered after being missing for weeks.

== Julia Thornton ==
Julia Thornton
- Shortland Street character
- Portrayed by: Elizabeth Hawthorne
- Duration: 1995-1996
- First appearance: 29 April 1995; Episode 750
- Last appearance: 2 September 1996; Episode 1106
- Introduced by: Gavin Strawhan
In-universe information
- Occupation: Doctor
- Family: Thornton
- Husband: Richard Thornton
- Sons: James Thornton

Dr Julia Thornton was introduced in mid-1995 as the matriarch of the Thornton family and the new clinic director. When the Warner family tried to buy out Dr Michael McKenna’s (Paul Gittins) shares and control of the clinic, Michael sold the management contract to Dr Grace Kwan’s (Lynette Forday) former colleague Julia. Quickly earning the nickname “Needle Nose”, Julia was a formidable businesswoman with ambitious plans to expand the services offered by the clinic quickly introducing oncology, in-house pathology, and sports medicine units, however the clinic continued to lurch from one financial or staffing crisis to the next.

Julia arrived in Ferndale with her teenage son James (Chris Dykzeul) and psychologist husband Richard (James Hayward). Julia’s home life was chaotic with James attention seeking stunts, Richard prone to bouts of depression and Julia often finding comfort in the arms of the much younger Zac Smith (Mike Edward). Whilst her marriage appeared solid, Richard discovered that he was not James’s biological father and Julia planned on leaving Richard once and for all, however Richard died after falling from the roof of their house.

Following the death of Richard, Julia found herself in a relationship with Johnny Marinovich (Stelios Yiakmis). By mid-1996 the clinic was in financial trouble and Julia was facing being fired by the board. A lifeline was given to her by Dr David Kearney (Peter Elliott) who purchased the management contract and any financial interest in the clinic from her. Julia accepted a General practitioner role to stay on at the clinic but struggled to adjust to being based on the shop floor full time. After a few months Julia continued to face personal financial difficulties. Whilst Johnny planned to buy her house so that they could be together, Julia sold her home to David. Seeking a fresh start and second chance for her management career, Julia accepted a management role with the Regional Health Authority in Christchurch, leaving Johnny and James behind in Ferndale.

== James Thornton ==
James Thornton
- Shortland Street character
- Portrayed by: Chris Dykzeul
- Duration: 1995-1998
- First appearance: 15 May 1995; Episode 761
- Last appearance: 1998
- Introduced by: Gavin Strawhan
In-universe information
- Occupation: Student
- Family: Thornton
- Father: Phillip Smith
- Mother: Julia Thornton
- Stepfather: Richard Thornton
- Half-brothers: Zac Smith

James Thornton first appeared in mid-1995 as the son of new clinic director Dr Julia Thornton (Elizabeth Hawthorne), forming part of the second generation of high school aged characters for the show. James dated fellow student Lulu Chatfield (Meighan Desmond) and was close friends with Minnie Crozier (Katrina Devine). A spoilt, only child, James was prone to attention seeking stunts to provoke a reaction from his parents. A passionate photographer, James had an eye for observing human behaviour and manipulating others to get his way.

In 1998, after having a relationship with the Acting D.O.N. Lindsay Maguire (Alison Bruce) they both leave the clinic for Melbourne where he completes his training to become a doctor.

== Richard Thornton ==
Richard Thornton
- Shortland Street character
- Portrayed by: James Hayward
- Duration: 1995
- First appearance: 17 May 1995; Episode 763
- Last appearance: 2 October 1995; Episode 861
- Introduced by: Gavin Strawhan
In-universe information
- Occupation: Psychiatrist
- Family: Thornton
- Wife: Julia Thornton
- Stepsons: James Thornton

Dr Richard Thornton first appeared in 1995 as the husband of the new clinic director Dr Julia Thornton (Elizabeth Hawthorne). A psychiatrist by trade, Richard was first introduced as a facilitator brought in by Julia to improve team dynamics at the clinic. Julia soon awarded a contract to deliver psychiatric services at the clinic to Richard, much to the concern of family friend and former colleague Dr Grace Kwan’s (Lynette Forday). Richard had previously faced a claim of sexual harassment from a patient which ended up costing Julia her role at a hospital in Australia in an attempt to save both their careers.

Richard had spent most of the past decade as a house husband and the primary caregiver to their son James (Chris Dykzeul) whilst also working on writing a book. Richard initially settled well into working at the clinic, but when he learned that James cannot biologically be his son, his professional and personal relationships with Julia became strained. Richard spiralled into another depressive episode, becoming increasingly volatile, and drinking more, whilst Julia planned on leaving him. Following a drunken argument about the television aerial, Richard fell from roof trying to fix the aerial with his body found by James the next day. The Coroner ruled the death as a misadventure.

== Carla Crozier ==
Nurse Carla Crozier (later Leach and Summerfield) portrayed by Elisabeth Easther was a major antagonist from mid 1995 to mid 1996 and again during 2021. The character debuted as a new nurse working at the clinic under her estranged sister Ellen Crozier (Robyn Malcolm) and gained notoriety as the show's first ever on screen murderer, killing her husband Bernie Leach (Timothy Bartlett) during the show’s 1000 episode. The character returned 25 years later as a therapist using the surname Summerfield, who began to treat and manipulate Director of Nursing Nicole Miller-Mullens (Sally Martin) and briefly working at the hospital.

== Zac Smith ==
Zac Smith arrived in a guest role in mid 1995 as the potential love interest for Grace Kwan (Lynette Forday). He returned several months later when he was revealed as the illegitimate half brother of James Thornton (Chris Dykzeul) before he embarked on a scandalous storyline where he dated James' mother and recent widow - Julia Thornton (Elizabeth Hawthorne). Zac returned in 2002, and in a more central role in 2012.

== Ana Fa’asolo ==
Ana Fa’asolo
- Shortland Street character
- Portrayed by: Mary Los’e
- Duration: 1995-1997
- First appearance: 5 June 1995; Episode 781
- Last appearance: 3 June 1997; Episode 1267
- Introduced by: Gavin Strawhan
In-universe information
- Occupation: Nurse

Nurse Ana Fa’asolo was the first Pasifika nurse introduced to the show. Along with fellow nurse Harry (Dean O'Gorman), Ana was taken in as a lodger by Lionel Skeggins (John Leigh) whilst his wife Kirsty (Angela Dotchin) was overseas. When Kirsty returned, she clashed frequently with the headstrong and ambitious Ana and ultimately kicked Ana out. The pair reluctantly team up in late-1995 as part of a pyramid scheme called New Day.

Ana became a lodger for Julia Thornton (Elizabeth Hawthorne) and quickly became friends with her and son James. A love triangle with Sam Aleni (Rene Naufahu) and her boss Carla Leach (Elisabeth Easther) resulted in Ana launching a prank campaign against Carla. The campaign resulted in losing Sam to Carla and her place in the Thornton household. After a period of couch surfing, Ana started renting Ellen Crozier’s (Robyn Malcolm) house with a newly single Kirsty and Caroline Buxton (Tandi Wright).

Many of Ana’s storyline’s involved a cycle of losing her employment at the clinic due to a scheme backfiring, failing to gain meaningful employment elsewhere, and returning to the clinic. In early 1997, following another period of unemployment, Ana is offered the role of nursing coordinator in Jenny Harrison’s (Maggie Harper) women’s clinic. Her housemates thought that the death of Rebecca Frost would mark Ana giving up on schemes, however she soon began a new scheme of acting as broker for life insurance. After obtaining a list of terminal patients, Ana was once again suspended by David Kearney (Peter Elliott). Although Jenny immediately reinstated her, Ana had lost the confidence of the nursing staff and was quickly let go by Jenny. After receiving the life insurance payout from one of the patients and remained unashamed of her actions, Ana realised she had lost the respect of her housemates and tearfully left Ferndale.

== Harry Martin ==
Harry Martin
- Shortland Street character
- Portrayed by: Dean O'Gorman
- Duration: 1995-1996
- First appearance: 5 June 1995; Episode 781
- Last appearance: 24 May 1996; Episode 1035
- Introduced by: Gavin Strawhan
In-universe information
- Occupation: Nurse (1995-1996); Deckhand (1996)

Nurse Harry Martin arrived in mid-1995 and was taken in as a lodger by Lionel Skeggins (John Leigh) whilst Lionel’s Kirsty (Angela Dotchin) was overseas. Harry was a new graduate nurse and the son of judge. When Kirsty returned, she clashed frequently with other lodger and fellow nurse Ana (Mary Los’e) but bonded with Harry. Harry quickly developed a crush on Kirsty, but when she made it clear that there was no chance of a relationship, Harry took the opportunity to go to England and be Suzannah Beauchamp’s (Judy Rankin) personal nurse.

Harry returned at Christmas time with a renewed mission to break up Kirsty and Lionel. Following the Christmas Truck Crash, Kirsty was left with amnesia. Harry to tried to court Kirsty once again but faced competition with Greg Feeney (Tim Balme) back in Ferndale as well. Harry soon grew close to 15 year old Minnie Crozier (Katrina Devine) much to the concern of her mother, and Harry’s boss, Ellen (Robyn Malcolm) and the rest of clinic staff. Unable to have sex with Minnie as she was a minor and a newly divorced Kirsty not interested in having a serious relationship with him, an exit strategy soon appeared when old nursing school friend Cameron Scott (Glen Drake) came to town. Harry took the opportunity to set sail with Cameron as a part of a luxury yacht crew, leaving his difficult love life behind.

== Finlay Keats ==
Finlay Keats
- Shortland Street character
- Portrayed by: Peter McCauley
- Duration: 1995-1996
- First appearance: 23 August 1995; Episode 833
- Last appearance: 23 February 1996; Episode 970
- Introduced by: Gavin Strawhan
In-universe information
- Occupation: Oncologist
- Wife: Kathleen Keats

Dr Finlay Keats was introduced in mid-1995 as the head of the new Oncology Unit. Finlay received a mixed reception from the clinic staff and was equally frosty in return, however quickly demonstrated his surprisingly warm bedside manner. Finlay became the object of unwanted affection from Marilyn Bluck (Donna Akersten) and briefly dated clinic director Julia Thornton (Elizabeth Hawthorne). Whilst the staff believed Finlay to be single, his wife Kathleen (Joy Watson) was admitted to the clinic in early December and revealed to have advanced Alzheimer's disease. Julia convinced Finlay to have Kathleen placed in a nursing home. Kathleen was soon admitted to the clinic showing signs of abuse. Finlay decided to leave the clinic to focus on caring for Kathleen full time. Much to his disgust, Julia hired his former colleague David Kearney (Peter Elliott) to replace him in leading the oncology unit. Finlay made a quiet exit from the clinic after convincing Jenny Harrison to undergo chemotherapy.

== Nancy Harding ==
Nancy Harding
- Shortland Street character
- Portrayed by: Rose Dube
- Duration: 1995
- First appearance: 29 August 1995; Episode 837
- Last appearance: 14 September 1995; Episode 849
- Introduced by: Gavin Strawhan
In-universe information
- Occupation: Therapist

Nancy Harding briefly worked at the clinic’s Oncology unit in mid-1995. Nancy was an alternative therapist based upon positive visualisation, forced upon the unit by Sir Bruce Warner (Ken Blackburn). Whilst her role was supposed to provide complementary services to Finlay Keats’ (Peter McCauley) traditional therapy, Nancy undermined the overall operation. After speaking to the media without approval, Nancy was fired from the clinic with her behaviour deemed “unethical, unprofessional, and unacceptable” by Clinic Director #Julia Thornton (Elizabeth Hawthorne) but quickly landed on her feet with a new job in Christchurch. Guy Warner (Craig Parker) discovered that Nancy had lied about her own cancer diagnosis and self-healing treatments. Nancy was left a sum of money in Sir Bruce’s estate upon his death in December 1995.

== Erik Van Der Molen ==
Erik Van Der Molen
- Shortland Street character
- Portrayed by: Peter Daube
- Duration: 1995
- First appearance: 3 October 1995; Episode 862
- Last appearance: 15 December 1995; Episode 915
- Introduced by: Gavin Strawhan
In-universe information
- Occupation: Police Officer
- Wife: Val Van Der Molen
- Sons: Harvey Van Der Molen

Police Officer Erik Van Der Molen was introduced in mid-1995 as a love interest for Rebecca Frost (Luisa Burgess). Erik was first seen investigating a break in on The Toroa, Guy Warner (Craig Parker), Carmen Roberts (Theresa Healey), and Rebecca’s home. Rebecca quickly fell for Erik who failed to mention that he was legally still married and had a son Harvey (Jacob Vitasovich). Carmen accidentally shot Erik, putting his career on the line. Following the birth of Guy and Carmen’s child, Erik saw a future with Rebecca and was keen to settle down and have children of their own, however Rebecca’s heart condition would make that near impossible. In the lead up to Christmas, Erik confronted his wife to finalise their divorce only to discover that Val is now pregnant. Erik chose to go back to Val and raise their children together.

== Tuesday Warner ==
Tuesday Warner
- Shortland Street character
- Portrayed by: Kelly Tate (1995–96); Olivia Tennet (2007—)
- Duration: 1995–96, 2007–08, 2026
- First appearance: 24 October 1995
- Introduced by: Gavin Strawham (1995); Jason Daniel (2007); Oliver Driver (2026)
In-universe information
- Father: Guy Warner
- Mother: Carmen Roberts
- Grandfathers: Vic Roberts; Sir. Bruce Warner
- Grandmothers: Pauline Roberts; Margot Warner (adoptive)
- Uncles: Chris Warner
- Aunts: Amanda Warner; Toni Warner
- First cousins: Sarah Burton; Finbar Burton; Frank Burton; Phoenix Raynor; Harry Warner; James Warner; Trinity Kwan

Tuesday Warner first appeared in late 1995 when she was born to parents - Carmen Roberts (Theresa Healey) and Guy Warner (Craig Parker) in a storm. The following year Tuesday was diagnosed with a brain tumour and she and Guy were forced to go to America for it to be operated on. The two returned 11 years later and it was soon clear to Guy's brother Chris (Michael Galvin), that Tuesday was covering up Guy's drug addiction. They fled Ferndale but upon their return 6 months later, got into a devastating car crash. Tuesday began to attend high school and developed a crush on Wiremu Potae (Scott Cotter) but it was unrequited and she ended up returning to America with Guy. Tuesday returned for Chris and Miriama Ropata (Maria Walker) wedding in November 2026 and revealed she was practising as a Criminal Lawyer, opting not to pursue the family tradition of medicine.

== Ryan Birch ==
Ryan Birch
- Shortland Street character
- Portrayed by: Robert Harte
- Duration: 1995-1996
- First appearance: 10 November 1995; Episode 890
- Last appearance: 10 April 1996; Episode 1002
- Introduced by: Gavin Strawhan
In-universe information
- Occupation: Physiotherapist
- Daughters: Minnie Crozier

Ryan Birch was introduced in late-1995 as the estranged father of Minnie Crozier (Katrina Devine) who had been living in San Francisco and working as a physiotherapist. Minnie was conceived when Ryan and Ellen (Robyn Malcolm) were teenagers at swim meet in Tokyo, Ryan was drunk and had sex with her without consent. Ellen raised Minnie without any contact with Ryan and struggled with his return to their lives. Whilst Minnie was hoping for her parents to get back together, Ryan started dating Ellen’s best friend Grace Kwan (Lynette Forday). Grace sided with Ryan when Ellen confronted him about the rape, however all parties eventually accepted that it happen. Following a run in with Ellen’s sister Carla (Elisabeth Easther), Ryan took Minnie back to San Francisco for Christmas and threatened to go for full custody.

When Minnie returned in the new year, she decided she wanted to remain in Ferndale. Ryan relocated to New Zealand to maintain his relationships with Minnie and Grace. Julia (Elizabeth Hawthorne) employed Ryan as a physiotherapist and attempted to build a Sports Injury Clinic around his reputation. Grace quickly fell out of love with Ryan and Carla made his work life difficult. The Sports Clinic relied upon a new MRI machine but when a delay in results coming through caused a neck manipulation of Adele Pratt (Paula Keenan) to end up having a stroke, Julia closed the Clinic and terminated Ryan’s employment. Grace fought to have Ryan reinstated but he found employment in Dannevirke.

== Caroline Buxton ==
Caroline Buxton (Tandi Wright) was introduced in late 1995 as a private, palliative care nurse for the dying Sir Bruce Warner (Ken Blackburn) and went on to be a core cast member for the rest of the 1990s. Caroline joined the clinic as a receptionist in early 1996 and later became a staff nurse. Caroline’s two key storylines are the 1997 euthanasia plot and her 1999 lesbian affair with Dr Laura Hall (Larissa Matheson). Caroline departed Ferndale in early 2000, pregnant and on the run with her on again / off again boyfriend Greg Feeney (Tim Balme).

== Emily Devine ==
Emily Devine arrived to the clinic as a new pathologist in late 1995, and stayed until 1997 when after uncovering a breakthrough medicine, Emily was headhunted for a pharmaceutical company in Switzerland. The actress Michaela Rooney continued to work on the show as a storyliner and editor before returning on screen as Emily in 2019 and 2020, portraying her as living with early-onset dementia, suffering significant memory loss and having been homeless for several years.

== Fergus Kearney ==
David Fergus Kearney was portrayed by Paul Ellis for numerous recurring stints from 1995 to 1999 before becoming a regular character until 2001 and briefly returned in 2002. Initially introduced as a street kid being helped by Guy Warner (Craig Parker), Fergus was reintroduced in 1996 as the estranged son of Dr David Kearney (Peter Elliott).

== Dominique Coombes ==
Dominique Coombes
- Shortland Street character
- Portrayed by: Jay Saussey
- Duration: 1995-1996
- First appearance: 6 December 1995; Episode 908
- Last appearance: 1 March 1996; Episode 975
- Introduced by: Gavin Strawhan
In-universe information
- Occupation: Prostitute
- Father: Ted Coombes

Dominique Coombes was introduced in late 1995 as a part of a gang of homeless youth who broke into the clinic and ended up being supported by Guy Warner (Craig Parker) and Rachel McKenna (Angela Bloomfield). Dominique quickly became a love interest for James Thornton (Chris Dykzeul), who discovered Dominique huffed glue and was a prostitute. When Guy tried to reunite Dominique with her abusive and alcoholic father Ted (Ian Watkin), Dominique was taken under the wing of Carla Crozier (Elisabeth Easther). Carla made multiple attempts to have Ted arrested and antagonised him to the point where he drove his truck into the clinic to get to Dominique. The truck crash resulted in the death of nurse Carmen Roberts (Theresa Healey) and Dominique being blamed for her death by teen rival Lulu (Meighan Desmond). Dominique felt suffocated by Carla’s manipulations and moved into the Thornton household. Dominique moved back in with Carla after being involuntarily committed to a mental health facility. Getting caught up in Tyrone Pratt’s (David Gibson) petty crimes robs her of any chance of a normal life in Ferndale and left with Tyrone for Dunedin.
