= Ellen Crozier =

- Shortland Street character
- Portrayed by: Robyn Malcolm
- Duration: 1994–1999
- First appearance: 23 February 1994; Episode 457
- Last appearance: 16 November 1999
- Introduced by: Tony Holden
In-universe information
- Occupation: Nurse
- Family: The Kearney's
- Mother: Glenys Crozier
- Sisters: Carla Crozier
- Husband: Johnny Marinovich (1989–1996); David Kearney (1997–)
- Daughters: Minnie Crozier; Rose Crozier-Kearney

Ellen Rosemary Crozier is a fictional character on the New Zealand soap opera Shortland Street, who was portrayed by Robyn Malcolm for nearly six years in the mid to late 1990s.

== Casting ==
Robyn Malcolm "won" the role of Ellen Crozier during the shows third season in 1994. At the time, the shows primary writers were James Griffin and Rachel Lang and Malcolm remembers the period as not only a highlight of her career, but of Shortland Street in general. Malcolm retained the role for nearly 6 years. Malcolm made her last appearance in November 1999.

== Storylines ==
Following the resignation of Senior Charge Nurse Jaki Manu (Nancy Brunning). Ellen was recruited by clinic director Michael McKenna following a recommendation by friend and former colleague Grace Kwan (Lynette Forday). Prior to her interview, Marj (Elizabeth McRae) identified Ellen as a bronze medal swimmer from the 1978 Commonwealth Games. Due to her experience in high dependency nursing and four years in management roles at Central, Ellen was offered the higher role of Director of Nursing.

Always running late, the clinic staff soon piece together more of Ellen’s home life with her having a 13 year old daughter Minnie (Katrina Devine), and an anaesthetist husband of 6 years Johnny (Stelios Yiakmis). Ellen encouraged Johnny to join the on-call anaesthetist roster for the new High Dependency Unit. Conflict soon arose when Minnie developed an infatuation with Nick Harrison and Johnny’s first patient, Alex McKenna, ended up in a coma. Ellen’s friendship with Grace was tested when patients of a historic drug trial that was supervised by Grace and Minnie had been enrolled in, were found to have developed epilepsy; and then Grace discovered Johnny had a secret second family including an 8 year old daughter. Whilst Johnny initially admitted to being the father, he lied about how long he had known of the girl. Once Ellen discovered that Johnny was having a long term affair with the girl’s mother, she called an end to her marriage resulting in Minnie acting out. Ellen took up smoking and accidentally burned down their home. Whilst Ellen moved into Sam Aleni’s (Rene Naufahu) share house, Minnie and Johnny moved into the Harrison’s home whilst Jenny was overseas. Ellen tried to play Cupid with housemates Sam and Rebecca (Luisa Burgess), however this backfired and resulted in Rebecca moving out of the house. By the end of the year Johnny was in a relationship with Jenny, and Ellen and Johnny both vied for Minnie to live with them. Ellen was able to use her share of the insurance money to buy the share house from Carrie Burton and convert the shed into a sleepout for Minnie.

After rescuing Bernie Leach (Timothy Bartlett) the pair dated briefly, however Bernie’s temper and constant gift giving became too much for Ellen. The arrival of Ellen's estranged sister Carla to work as a nurse at the clinic added extra complications to Ellen’s domestic life. Carla soon married Bernie and Ellen ended up returning to Johnny for a short lived affair whilst he was in a relationship with Jenny. When Jenny is diagnosed with cancer and Johnny still up to his old tricks, Ellen called things off with Johnny once and for all. Minnie’s father Ryan (Robert Harte) returned to their lives and started dating Grace, who didn’t at first believe Ellen when she revealed that Minnie was a product of rape. Ryan and Ellen eventually made peace for the sake of Minnie.

In 1996, Carla’s mental health continued to decline and an attempt to undermine Tiffany (Alison James) resulted in Ellen losing her Director of Nursing role and being required to work under supervision. Following the Ferndale earthquake and death of Bernie, Ellen at first refused to believe that Carla could be responsible for his murder. However, Carla’s actions became increasingly irrational and following a suicide attempt, Ellen arranged for Carla to be sectioned in a mental health facility. Carla had an adverse reaction to her medication during a visit from Ellen, resulting in Carla attacking Ellen. After realising that the institution was not the best option for Carla, Carla was discharged into their mother’s care. Carla revealed the truth to the Nursing Council about setting up Tiffany and Ellen’s restrictions were lifted, however Ellen gave Tiffany her blessing to remain in the Director of Nursing’s position.

By mid-1996 Ellen started to date the new clinic director David Kearney (Peter Elliott) with the soon pair moving in together and blending their families. However, between Johnny manipulations and Ellen misinterpreting David’s ex-wife answering his phone during a business trip, Ellen fled the country on a round the world trip with Grace. David eventually tracked down Ellen to a hospital in Fiji where she was working and revealed that she’s pregnant. The two married in 1997 but the death of their baby Rose (Georgia Bishop) the following year, separated the two and they both had affairs - Ellen with Rangi Heremaia and David with Bridget (Katie Wolfe). They finally decided to reunite but David felt obliged to stay with Bridget who was dying from brain cancer. The pair reconciled in 1999 when David was diagnosed with a blinding disorder and the two left for an early retirement in Hawke's Bay. Ellen informed Waverley Wilson (Claire Chitham) on the phone, that she and David would not be able to attend her wedding to David's son Fergus (Paul Ellis) in 2001 due to money problems and David’s health.

== Character development ==
=== Cot death storyline ===
In 1996, producers decided to have Shortland Street undergo a cot death storyline and the decision was made for the character of Ellen to undergo it. Needing a suitable father character, writers paired Ellen with relatively new character, David Kearney (Peter Elliott). Ellen and David had been dating for several months but the arrival of his ex-wife Isobel Kearney (Jennifer Ward-Lealand) lead to Ellen thinking the two had reconciled, causing her to flee to Fiji. In a specially shot episode in the country, David tracked her down and the two reconciled, only for Ellen to announce she was pregnant. The couple decided to marry to support the child and lured their friends to the ceremony under the pretense that it was Grace Kwan's (Lyentte Forday) birthday. Producers encountered a problem when developing the storyline, when they realized they had accidentally over run Ellen's pregnancy. A quick fill in story was devised where Ellen was nervous that the baby was so late. In the casting of Ellen and David's child, the daughter of the show's medical adviser was chosen. Having set the storyline up to unfold in 1998, crew members began to get cold feet due to the uneasiness of shooting the scene using one of their co workers own children and the fact that two of the storyliners had fallen pregnant. On screen, Ellen had an unscheduled birth, giving birth to Rose Crozier-Kearney (Georgia Bishop) in her bathroom, but help arrived in the form of Caroline Buxton (Tandi Wright) just in time. Due to the tenderness of the storyline, it was continuously pushed back until the stage where it was nearing the point of improbability. The plot was ultimately scheduled to air in the last possible week with the potential of cot death to occur. In February 1998, Ellen was shocked to discover her baby daughter Rose, had died in her sleep. The scene was shot with the baby's actress but Malcolm was directed to quickly pick her up and then the shot was changed to a close up, to avoid any movements from the child. The couple's devastation at Rose's death saw them break up and date other characters. However, over a year later they finally put Rose to rest and reconciled. The storyline landed Malcolm with her first ever television acting nomination. The subject of a child's death was dealt with twice more in the soap, 5 years later in the death of Te Ngakau Hudson, and 10 years later with the death of Kelly Piper.

== Reception ==
The character of Ellen received a hugely favorable reception and is often looked back on by reviewers with a positive view. Ellen's pairing with David Kearney (Peter Elliott) proved to be hugely popular and by the mid nineties, the family unit based around the character was the most integral and high-profile set of characters in the soap. The role of Ellen was said to have made Malcolm a household name in New Zealand and though entirely different than her role of Cheryl West in Outrageous Fortune, was believed to be a paving stone. The show's main writers throughout the mid nineties, James Griffin and Rachel Lang (future creators of Outrageous Fortune), gave Ellen the nickname "slut in a cardigan". The cot death of Ellen's daughter Rose turned out to be a widely well received storyline and is remembered as one of the most iconic to feature on the soap. From the cot death storyline, Malcolm went on to be nominated for "Best Actress" in the 1998 TV Guide Best on the Box Awards. In 2000, a reviewer for The New Zealand Herald criticized the show and called for the return of Ellen, a character she actually cared about. The departure of Ellen amongst several other core characters, saw a fall in the ratings for the soap and several measures were made to fix this, such as the reintroduction of Chris Warner (Michael Galvin). In 2017 New Zealand Herald columnist Ricardo Simich expressed his desire for Ellen to return for the soap opera's 25th anniversary saying it would be remiss not celebrate Malcolm's success. That same year stuff.co.nz journalist Fleur Mealing named Ellen as the 3rd character she most wanted to return for the show's 25th anniversary, citing the need to celebrate where Malcolm started her career.
