= David Kearney (Shortland Street) =

- Shortland Street character
- Portrayed by: Peter Elliott
- Duration: 1996–99, 2020, 2022–2026
- First appearance: 25 February 1996
- Last appearance: 13 May 2026
- Introduced by: Gavin Strawhan (1996); Maxine Fleming & Oliver Driver (2020); Oliver Driver (2022)
In-universe information
- Occupation: Doctor; Clinic Director of Shortland Street (1996–99); Health Executive / Bureaucrat (2022-2026)
- Sisters: Liz Stokes
- Wife: Isobel Kearney (until 1996); Ellen Crozier (1997—20??); Susan Rolleston (202?-2026)
- Sons: Fergus Kearney; Sean Kearney
- Daughters: Rose Crozier-Kearney
- Nephews: Robert Stokes
- Nieces: Anne Stokes

Dr. David Kearney is a fictional character on the New Zealand soap opera Shortland Street, who was portrayed by Peter Elliott from early 1996 to late 1999 and for a guest appearances in 2020 and 2022, where he returned for the show's 30th anniversary.

== Creation and casting ==
Peter Elliott was cast in the role of David in 1995, with his first appearance airing in early 1996. Part of the intention of the characters introduction, was a future partnership with established character – Ellen Crozier (Robyn Malcolm), for what was to become, a cot death storyline. Elliott stated, "It’s an honour to be asked to join New Zealand’s most successful television drama .... It is a lovely challenge to play someone who is straightforward and charming because I’m so used to being the nasty guy." David arrived to screens with the producers intending to expand upon his family. He was said to have a "secret", which was later revealed to be a runaway homeless son. A minor character named Fergus (Paul Ellis), who had appeared in several episodes in late 1995, impressed producers and he was rewritten so as to be David's estranged son. Elliot was protective of his character and would change lines and object to storylines so as to best suit how he thought David would act. This led to a conflict with the production staff due to what Elliot believed was an inaccurate portrayal of men on the soap opera. He had a "worry that there was nothing on television that young males could see that was in any way a positive role model."

In 1999, Elliott's contract was not renewed. He was "outraged" and "upset", but later was happy to have had the ability to work in other roles. Elliott believed himself to be "bitter and tired and worn out" at the time of the axing believing that he had left "under a bit of a cloud ... I felt the powers that be had betrayed me. I felt a bit sold out." The character made his last appearance alongside screen wife Ellen, in November 1999. Elliott reprised his role for cameos in 2020, and in May 2022 for the show's 30th anniversary. Several months later Elliott was invited back in an extended stint, debuting in November 2022 and believed due to his previous axing he had, "carried a lot of baggage around that for quite some time. That’s been largely healed by being invited back". He signed an initial contract until early 2023. In 2025 following waning ad revenue and a new funding model, Shortland Street was cut from 5-episodes a week to 3, that would air across the year in 4 "mini-seasons". After a largely medical-based storyline season throughout 2025, Producers chose to premiere a "Legacy" mini-season the following year that would have a "tonal-shift" to the soap's original tone, featuring more humour and light-hearted storylines. As part of the new "Legacy" mini-season, Elliott returned to the soap in a more regular capacity and believed that with the help of Producer Oliver Driver, the soap, "values the craft more than it did 30 years ago.". Alongside David, "Legacy" also saw the returns of Rachel McKenna (Angela Bloomfield) and Libby Jeffries (Fleur Saville), with Driver believing the three characters were "Icons. Trouble magnets. Agents of chaos" who helped in "owning" the past of Shortland Street.

== Storylines ==
David arrived as Jenny Harrison's (Maggie Harper) replacement oncologist after her diagnosis of breast cancer and initial treatment under Dr Finlay Keats (Peter McCauley). He developed an interest in the clinic and ended up buying Julia Thornton's (Elizabeth Hawthorne) shares and the management contract, placing him as the Clinic Director. He briefly dated Caroline Buxton (Tandi Wright) before he fell in love with Ellen Crozier (Robyn Malcolm) and the two moved in together. However the return of his ex-wife Isobel (Jennifer Ward-Lealand) saw Ellen flee overseas and when David tracked her down in Fiji, they reconciled and she admitted she was pregnant. The following year the two married and not long later, Ellen gave birth to Rose (Georgia Bishop). Rose died from cot death and when David discovered Ellen had cheated on him in grief, he too had an affair with Bridget Hastings (Katie Wolfe). However, as the year ended he realised he still loved Ellen but Bridget's diagnosis with a brain tumour led him to stay with her. In 1999 David and Ellen began an affair and Bridget soon left him. The happiness was short lived however when David was diagnosed with a rare disorder that would leave him blind. He retired and the couple decided to move to a lifestyle block in the Hawkes Bay. David and Ellen did not return for David's son Fergus' (Paul Ellis) wedding in 2001 as David was too ill.

In 2020 Boyd Rolleston (Sam Bunkall) was shocked to learn his mother Susan (Miranda Harcourt) and father were divorcing as Susan had been having an affair. Inviting the new man to his wedding, Boyd was introduced to David whom Susan was now in a partnership with. David returned in a documentary style reappearance in 2022 reminiscing on his time as head of the then private clinic he part owned. David returned later to replace Raj Prasad (Mel Odedra) as the DHB representative overseeing the hospital. He used his influence to remove TK Samuels (Benjamin Mitchell) as CEO with Rebekah Anderson (Antonia Prebble) replacing him, and the funding from her church used to rebuild the fire-damaged hospital. Chris later discovered David had been blackmailed into doing so by Rebekah. Upon being confronted, David joined forces with Chris and TK to dispatch Rebekah and orchestrated Monique Strutter (Courtenay Louise) into the role of Operations Manager as her replacement. However following an unsuccessful intern programme and shooting at the hospital, he sidelined Monique and put Esther Samuels (Ngahuia Piripi) into the CEO role. In 2024 David encouraged Esther and Monique to pursue Artificial Intelligence-based surgery at the hospital. David made a brief cameo during the 2025 “Contagion” story arc by trying to assist Chris find a cure for the virus plaguing the hospital.

David played a larger role in the 2026 season’s first major arc “Legacy”. Susan had divorced David, leaving him broke. David recruited Rachel McKenna (Angela Bloomfield) to return as the hospital’s CEO and tasked her with removing Chris from the hospital. After Chris tendered his resignation, David opened the Shortland Street Fertility Clinic and established himself as clinical lead. Chris and Rachel teamed up to discover that David was running an illegal clinical trial through the fertility clinic on behalf of reoccurring villains Lynch Pharmaceuticals. Before the scandal could be publicly exposed, David was blackmailed by Lynch into taking sole responsibility for the trial.

== Character development ==
=== Cot death storyline ===
In 1996, producers decided to have Shortland Street undergo a cot death storyline and the decision was made for the character of Ellen Crozier (Robyn Malcolm) to undergo it. Needing a suitable father character, writers paired Ellen with the relatively new character of David. Ellen and David had been dating for several months but the arrival of his ex-wife Isobel Kearney (Jennifer Ward-Lealand) lead to Ellen thinking the two had reconciled, causing her to flee to Fiji. In a specially shot episode in the country, David tracked her down and the two reconciled, only for Ellen to announce she was pregnant. The couple decided to marry to support the child and lured their friends to the ceremony under the pretense that it was Grace Kwan's (Lyentte Forday) birthday. Producers encountered a problem when developing the storyline, when they realized they had accidentally over run Ellen's pregnancy. A quick fill in story was devised where Ellen was nervous that the baby was so late. In the casting of Ellen and David's child, the daughter of the show's medical adviser was chosen. Having set the storyline up to unfold in 1998, crew members began to get cold feet due to the uneasiness of shooting the scene using one of their co workers own children and the fact that two of the storyliners had fallen pregnant. On screen, Ellen had an unscheduled birth, giving birth to Rose Crozier-Kearney (Georgia Bishop) in her bathroom, but help arrived in the form of Caroline Buxton (Tandi Wright) just in time. Due to the tenderness of the storyline, it was continuously pushed back until the stage where it was nearing the point of improbability. The plot was ultimately scheduled to air in the last possible week with the potential of cot death to occur. In February 1998, Ellen and David were shocked to discover her baby daughter Rose, had died in her sleep. The scene was shot with the baby's actress but Malcolm was directed to quickly pick her up and then the shot was changed to a close up, to avoid any movements from the child. The couple's devastation at Rose's death saw them break up and date other characters. However, over a year later they finally put Rose to rest and reconciled. The storyline landed Malcolm with her first ever television acting nomination. The subject of a child's death was dealt with once more in the soap, 5 years later in the death of Te Ngakau Hudson.

== Reception ==
David was a popular character and his pairing with Ellen Crozier also proved hugely popular. The Crozier-Kearney family became one of the primary families throughout the nineties and fronted several "great" storylines. The death of David's daughter Rose, proved hugely iconic and is remembered as on the shows greatest moments. Elliott himself, did not enjoy the character of David and believed he was unrealistically weak and vulnerable and that the soap's female characters were in comparison stronger and wiser. The departure of David amongst several other core characters, saw a fall in the ratings for the soap and several measures were made to fix this, such as the reintroduction of Chris Warner (Michael Galvin).
