= Shirley Maddock =

New Zealand writer, actor, and broadcaster

Shirley Maddock ONZM
- Born: Shirley Frances Whitley Maddock; 7 December 1928; Auckland, New Zealand
- Died: 10 October 2001 (aged 72); Hamilton, New Zealand
- Occupations: TV producer; TV presenter; author; actress
- Notable work: Islands of the Gulf (1964)
- Spouse: Michael Easther (m. 1965)
- Children: 3

Shirley Frances Whitley Maddock ONZM (7 December 1928 – 10 October 2001) was a New Zealand producer, television presenter, author and actress. After early work in theatre and radio, she became a pioneering figure in early New Zealand television. She produced and presented a number of award-winning documentaries, including New Zealand's first ever locally produced television documentary series, Islands of the Gulf (1964). Later in her career she wrote a number of non-fiction books about New Zealand's history and landscapes, worked as a book reviewer, and continued to make appearances on television and radio throughout the 1970s and 1980s.

== Early life and career ==
Maddock was born in Auckland, New Zealand, to Philip and Grace Maddock. Her father was the general manager of Metro Goldwyn Mayer New Zealand. She grew up in Wellington and attended Samuel Marsden Collegiate School.

Maddock travelled to London in 1947 and spent three years in British repertory theatre. She also had a bit-part in the film The Lavender Hill Mob (1951). In 1952 Maddock returned to New Zealand and joined the New Zealand Broadcasting Service (the predecessor of the New Zealand Broadcasting Corporation) and worked on women's radio programmes as a scriptwriter, announcer and researcher. She also worked briefly at the Alexander Turnbull Library and developed an interest in New Zealand's colonial history.

In order to gain experience with the new medium of television, which had not yet arrived in New Zealand, Maddock moved to New York City in 1958 and worked on television documentaries. At the same time she continued to work as a radio correspondent, sending reports back to New Zealand; her work included covering the Queen's visit to Virginia in 1957.

== New Zealand television career ==
With the arrival of television in New Zealand in June 1960, Maddock returned to New Zealand and became New Zealand's first television news writer, first television interviewer and first female television producer. At that time New Zealand's first TV channel, AKTV2, had just started broadcasting, and she was the second of five employees initially hired by the station. In an interview for a women's magazine, Maddock said:

In those days we did everything live and if that life were faltering through inexperience and misadventure, what we attempted was full of the zest which all pioneers share. You had to be a jack-of-all-trades: I wrote the newsreel, the continuity for each transmission, took my turn as announcer and interviewer and produced some tentative pieces on architecture, art and William Shakespeare.

In 1983, TVNZ said that her programmes were always well-researched and well-received by the public. One of her more unusual successes was discovering Graham Kerr, who became one of the world's first celebrity chefs.

One of Maddock's early documentaries for the NZBC was The Distant Shore (1963), about the landing at ANZAC Cove at Gallipoli on 25 April 1915. She used contemporary photographs, narration, sound effects and music to bring the story to life. The Distant Shore was awarded Best Documentary at the inaugural 1964 New Zealand National TV Awards.

Around this time, Maddock also wrote a novel called With Gently Smiling Jaws (1963). The novel was based on her own experiences as a young New Zealand woman travelling to New York City to work in commercial television.

== Islands of the Gulf ==
Maddock is best-known for producing and presenting New Zealand's first ever locally produced television documentary series, Islands of the Gulf, in 1964. The documentary involved Maddock (with photographer Don Whyte) exploring the Hauraki Gulf at a time when the islands of the Gulf were isolated from the outside world. Intended to be a one-off, Islands of the Gulf ended up running to five half-hour episodes, and made Maddock a household name. The first episode was about the Great Barrier Island. The series was followed by a best-selling non-fiction book, Islands of the Gulf (1966), based on the documentary. It was re-printed many times, including in 2017.

Maddock was not initially permitted by the NZBC to use the title "producer". In a 1993 interview with Jim Sullivan for Radio New Zealand, Maddock explained that "the hierarchy of broadcasting in those days didn't think that producer was a suitable title for a woman", and accordingly the credit line she was allowed to use was "written, devised and arranged by" or "written and presented by". It was only in 1965 that Maddock was allowed to use the credit title of "producer" for a documentary called A Capital Move, a centennial piece about the transfer of New Zealand government from Auckland to Wellington.

Maddock went on to produce other documentary series such as A Far Cry, about the National Women's Hospital, and The Tall Trees and the Gold (1966), about the history of logging and gold mining in New Zealand. The latter was the first New Zealand documentary to be sold overseas.

== Later career ==
After getting married and starting a family in the mid-1960s, Maddock wrote a number of non-fiction books, including Far As A Man May Go (1970), about the journey of Captain Cook to New Zealand, These Antipodes: A New Zealand Album (1979), The Waikato (1984), and A Pictorial History of New Zealand (1988). These Antipodes was described by The Press as "her most ambitious book to date", and a "rich and rewarding study, filled with fascinating detail". In 1971, Maddock wrote a play called Prospect from the Park, to mark Auckland's 150th anniversary.

In 1980, Maddock and her husband Michael Easther co-authored a book called A Christmas Garland: A New Zealand Christmas Album, 1642-1900. A review in The Press said it was a "charming book" and a "nostalgic look at antipodean Christmases". The book was also made into a half-hour television programme, which Maddock presented.

In 1983 Maddock presented a fifty-minute documentary revisiting Islands of the Gulf and commenting on the changes that had taken place since the 1964 programme. She continued to make other appearances on television and radio throughout the 1970s and 1980s, including guest appearances on television shows such as Hudson and Halls, Master of Arts and Beauty and the Beast. In 1974 and 1998 she sat as a judge for the New Zealand Television Awards. In 1983 she was appointed to the Information Authority, an entity then established to oversee the implementation of the Official Information Act 1982. Islands of the Gulf was re-screened by TVNZ in 1997. In later life she reviewed books on National Radio and for newspapers including the Waikato Times.

In the 1999 New Year Honours, Maddock was appointed an Officer of the New Zealand Order of Merit, for services to broadcasting. One of those who recommended her for the honour, radio broadcaster Sharon Crosbie, said Maddock was an inspiration for other women: "She broke through and proved herself, making programmes that were a revelation. In so many ways she set the standards for those who followed".

After her death on 10 October 2001, well-known New Zealand producer Max Cryer said she was one of television's "most respected producers", for which he credited her "background in radio and theatre, combined with her extreme intelligence". Judith Tizard, New Zealand's Associate Minister for Arts, Culture and Heritage, called her "a trailblazer in New Zealand broadcasting", and said her contribution to broadcasting and literature "has increased our self-confidence as a nation, by presenting New Zealand's social history in an accessible way".

== Personal life and family ==
In 1965, Maddock married Michael Easther (a Hamilton general practitioner, a Waikato Times crossword designer, and long-time Hamilton Operatic Society member). They had two sons and a daughter. Maddock's son Richard is a Professor and former Head of Department in the Department of Physics at the University of Auckland, her daughter Elisabeth played the role of Carla Crozier on television show Shortland Street from 1995 to 1996, and her son Philip is a Waikato organic farmer.

In 2018, Maddock's daughter Elisabeth Easther was the host of a remake of Islands in the Gulf for TVNZ during which she visited places that her mother had visited and re-interviewed surviving interviewees. Reviewer Greg Bruce, writing in The New Zealand Herald, gave the show a positive review, and noted: "The regular references and old footage may drive you, as they did me, to the NZ on Screen archives to watch the entire first episode from Easther's mum's 1964 series. Once there, you'll realise, as I did, that you've stumbled on a small masterpiece."
