= Jason Ryan =

Jason Ryan may refer to:

- Jason Ryan (baseball) (born 1976), retired Major League Baseball pitcher
- Jason Ryan (Gaelic footballer) (born 1976), Irish Gaelic football manager and former player
- Jason Ryan (rugby league), Australian former rugby league player
- Jason Ryan, crown witness against Pettingill family members, see Walsh Street police shootings

== See also ==
- Jay Ryan (disambiguation)
