= Carla Crozier =

Carla Summerfield
- Shortland Street character
- Portrayed by: Elisabeth Easther
- Duration: 1995–1996, 2021–2022
- First appearance: 11 May 1995
- Last appearance: 17 January 2022
- Introduced by: Gavin Strawhan (1995); Oliver Driver (2021)
In-universe information
- Occupation: Nurse Therapist
- Mother: Glenys Crozier
- Sisters: Ellen Crozier
- Husband: Bernie Leach (1995–1996)
- Nieces: Minnie Crozier

Carla Summerfield (née Crozier, also known as Leach) is a fictional character on the New Zealand soap opera Shortland Street, who was portrayed by Elisabeth Easther from early 1995 to mid 1996. The character debuted as the sister of established character Ellen Crozier (Robyn Malcolm) and gained notoriety as the show's first ever on screen murderer.

== Creation and casting ==
Carla was created as the estranged sister of Ellen Crozier and Elizabeth Easther was cast in the role. Easther was a recent graduate from drama school, with her only screen experience being that of a dinosaur in an Australian children's show. She signed an initial 1-year contract, but was extended for an additional six months on top of this. Producers decided that Carla "had outlived her usefulness" and opted not to renew her contract. Carla was written off the soap following the completion of the 18-month contract, and made her last appearance in July 1996. Easther described leaving the character as "cathartic" and shaved her iconic hair to rid her resemblance to the emotionally exhausting role. Owing to the character's psychotic nature, Easther struggled to get work for several years and was even replaced in a nappy commercial so as not to scare children.

Producers decided to reintroduce Carla in 2021 in an attempt to, "play to the nostalgia and [to] bring in viewers who remember that time on Shortland Street to come back and reengage with that show again." Producers planned this to align with a strategic shift in content planning at Television New Zealand, with the intention to, "focus on bringing in a dual audience through the nostalgia, and the freshness" by "Finding personalities who really resonate with our audiences can help us get cut through for our content". Easther was contacted on her 50th birthday with an offer to reprise the role, in what she described as an "amazing" opportunity. She signed a "short-term" contract. News leaked to the media that a villain would return to the soap leading to speculation this may be Carla, which was confirmed shortly thereafter with her return as "the show's most notorious villain" for its 30th season. Carla made her reappearance on 18 February 2021.

== Storylines ==
Carla arrived to visit her estranged sister, Shortland Street Head of Nursing Ellen (Robyn Malcolm), and soon got a job at the hospital as a newbie nurse. Whilst carrying out a blind-folded team bonding exercise, Carla intentionally fell down a large cliff and the two sisters finally reconciled when Ellen nursed her back to health. But Carla's true nature soon became apparent when she implied to her co-workers that Ellen had pushed her. Carla instantly clashed with fellow nurse Tiffany Pratt (Alison James) due to jealousy of her beauty, relationships, and career, falling out with her partner Chris Warner (Michael Galvin). She began to blackmail Tiffany when she discovered her Hepatitis C diagnosis and spiked Ellen's dinner with marijuana so she failed her mandatory drug test. Carla briefly assumed the title of 'Head of Nursing' before she was dramatically exposed, further deepening her hatred of Tiffany. Ellen was shocked when Carla began to date her ex-boyfriend Bernie Leach (Timothy Bartlett) and the two soon eloped in what appeared to already be an unhappy marriage. Still jealous of Tiffany, Carla spiked her drink leading to her walking in front of a truck. Many of their colleagues realised what had happened and turned against Carla. In an act of revenge, she sabotaged a surgery on Tiffany and nearly killed her, framing surgeon Johnny Marinovich (Stelios Yiakmis). Bernie and Carla's relationship continued to grow toxic due to his alcoholism and her manipulative manner. To ensure he would not leave her, Carla faked a pregnancy and subsequently a miscarriage after a minor car-crash whilst teaching her niece Minnie (Katrina Devine) to drive. When Bernie discovered Carla was unable to have children since her teenage years and thus had been lying, he angrily assaulted her and was arrested; Carla went to stay with her mother.

Carla bludgeoned her husband Bernie Leach (Timothy Bartlett) to death on the 1000th episode in 1996, becoming Shortland Street's first on-screen murder.

The hospital soon saw the return of Carla and she instantly caused trouble by manipulating an abusive parent to drive drunk, causing him to crash into the hospital and kill Nurse Carmen Roberts (Theresa Healey). Carla began a relationship with former Paramedic Sam Aleni (Rene Naufahu) whom was on a downward spiral and turning to alcohol. When Bernie returned after being acquitted of assault, Carla promised she would divorce him and take all his money. The two were injured when an earthquake hit Ferndale and a bloodied Bernie insulted Carla, resulting in her battering him to death with a candlestick, framing the scene to look like a casualty from the quake. Not many were fooled by the act but Ellen stood by her sisters strong calls of innocence. Eventually Tiffany convinced Ellen of the truth after she unearthed evidence Carla had in fact committed the crime, and Carla confessed. She instantly grew scared of losing Sam and retracted her statement, resulting in the Police mistakenly believing Sam was the culprit and arresting him. Whilst in prison, Sam's grandfather died and an upset Carla admitted to her crime, leading to a bitter breakup. Carla returned home and slit her wrists. Devastated, Ellen had her sectioned in a local psychiatric unit and Sam was released as an innocent man. Ellen visited her sister in the unit but was physically accosted by her and blamed for her mental decline. After realising that the institution was not the best option for Carla, she was taken to live with their mother. At the start of the 1997 season, Ellen received a call their mother informing her that Carla had been sentence to life imprisonment with a non-parole period of 10 years.

25 years later, Head of Nursing Nicole Miller (Sally Martin) began to visit a therapist to help with ongoing anxiety issues and following strict advice to ostracise her mother Leanne (Jennifer Ludlam), her therapist was unveiled as an apparently rehabilitated Carla. After hypnotising Chris Warner into forgetting her past, Carla soon landed a job at the hospital as a counsellor and developed a strong bond with Nicole, manipulating her through her sessions into isolating herself from friends and family. Working with several other staff members, she manipulated them into breaking up their relationships, committing offensive behaviour at work, and isolating themselves, so she could hold onto her control of Nicole. Nicole's wife Maeve (Jess Sayer) soon became fearful of Carla and eventually caught her choking Nicole to try trigger a panic attack and asset her control. This led to Carla's dismissal from the hospital and Nicole finally breaking from her manipulation. In a fit of anger, Carla kidnapped Nicole's son Kruse (Feleti Peter Aulika) and considered driving them both into the ocean. Nicole managed to track the two down and saved Pele, only for Carla to evade capture.

Months later Nicole learned Carla had been captured and she was required to give evidence in court. In December Carla was admitted to the Emergency Department after having been in a fight in prison. She apologised to Nicole and warned her against new doctor Vincent Hughes (Milo Cawthorne) who appeared to share history with her. However she managed to escape her hospital bed after hypnotising her prison guard and kidnapped Nicole by knifepoint. Threatening her life, she managed to convince Maeve that Vincent had known her at a former hospital job and had abused her physically. Releasing Nicole and apologising for the horror she had put her through, Carla was imprisoned with additional charges.

== Character development ==
The character was one of the soap opera's first true villains, being recognised as someone viewers "loved to hate" and contributing to the longevity of Shortland Street. Described by reviewers as a "psycho-bitch", and "psychotic", Easther believed Carla was, "super-smart ... and misunderstood" and attributed her nature to believing her sister "Ellen was the golden child and absolutely poisonous to Carla when they were little, so there's a Cinderella element there." An intense jealousy toward Ellen leads to Carla carrying out countless villainous acts including spiking her food so that she would fail a medical test. The chemistry between sister's was helped due to Easther and Robyn Malcolm's off-set relationship with Easther believing, "often when there's an actor who you're regularly doing tense scenes with, the awkwardness can bleed into real life, but she was always so kind." Her antagonistic nature was justified by Easther as Carla, "really does want to do good things, but there is always that little bit of Carla that can’t quite keep her grip on the good part."

The character bludgeoned her husband to death on the show in what was the soap's first on-screen murder. Airing as Shortland Street's 1000th episode, the storyline involved an earthquake hitting Ferndale and Carla using the opportunity to kill Bernie Leach (Timothy Bartlett) in the aftermath. The scene required extensive special effects including blood and bruising makeup which had to be cut due to the 7pm screening time, and rigged sets to emulate an earthquake. Bernie's final words to Carla before his death were "move your fat butt", and having developed a strong camaraderie with Easther on-set, Bartlett gifted her a t-shirt with these words as a departure gift. Upon Carla's return Easther hoped "she's cured of those lethal urges now, but I doubt that will be the case." Easther tried to relate to Carla's personality during the murder scene as she always believed "she had reasonable reasons (to do what she did). You’ve got to as an actor. You’ve got to have some kind of basis of humanity in your choices."

== Reception ==
Carla made a significant impact on Shortland Street viewers, with Easther becoming highly recognisable in public despite her original short stint. The character was remembered as the show's first ever on screen murderer, and was named by The New Zealand Woman's Day magazine as the 23rd best character of the soap's first 25 years. Easther found the fan interest odd, believing "everyone else has found her harder to let go ... It was probably the most defining thing I've ever done in my life and yet it's not the most important thing by a long shot." Carla was well received by critics with the character being named in an article by Michelle Hewitson for The New Zealand Herald, the 7th best character to feature on the show. Hewitson explained her choice, stating: "she was our very own psycho-bitch; our very own multiple-personality sufferer (all of them psycho-bitches.)" Ana Samaways also praised Carla, calling her a "beaut" when referring to a typical "run-of-the-mill nasty who gets away with it. A character who is related to someone and who makes viewers swing from hatred to understanding." Easther herself did not enjoy her acting throughout her stint and believed she was simply happy to be in the role. The episode airing on 31 May 1995 that saw Tiffany finally confront Carla is the highest rated episode of Shortland Street of all time with nearly a quarter of the New Zealand population viewing. Woman's Day Editor Sebastian van der Zwan named Carla as his favourite character and had been lobbying the show's publicists for a return prior to her 2021 reappearance.
