= The Art of The Architect =

2010s New Zealand television programme

- Genre: Documentary
- Directed by: Dean Cornish
- Presented by: Peter Elliott
- Country of origin: New Zealand
- Original language: English
- No. of seasons: 1
- No. of episodes: 8

Production
- Executive producer: Tina McLaren
- Producer: Gavin Wood
- Running time: 45 minutes

Original release
- Network: TVNZ 1
- Release: 20 March – 8 May 2014

The Art of The Architect is a 2014 New Zealand television series about architecturally-designed building projects, and is similar in format to Grand Designs. The New Zealand actor and narrator Peter Elliott presented the programme. Elliott had previously studied art history and architecture, and worked as a designer.

The series was originally intended to be recorded over an 18-month period, but building delays meant that it took more than four years. The series was broadcast in 2014. Only one series was produced, as the broadcaster TVNZ declined to commission further episodes. Grand Designs New Zealand, the local spinoff of the British programme, was first broadcast in 2015.

== Format ==
Each episode follows the progress of a single architectural project, with the presenter speaking with the architects, clients and the contractors. Projects profiled included domestic dwellings, a commercial building, and an educational venue. The final episode of the series surveyed three different projects.

== Episodes ==
No.	Title	Location	Original release date	Viewers
1	TBA	Auckland	20 March 2014	N/A
In this episode, witness the transformation of an Auckland section containing a derelict bungalow into a home and workshop for a car enthusiast.
2	TBA	Waikato	27 March 2014	N/A
When Waikato couple Robin and Colleen Ratcliffe decided to have their home architecturally designed, their passion for Egypt was always going to have a significant influence.
3	TBA	Wellington	3 April 2014	N/A
Having rented a home on Wellington's Oriental Parade for many years, Andrew and Sumi's dream has always been to own a home at this exclusive Wellington address.
4	TBA	Lake Wakatipu	10 April 2014	N/A
Ann, an expat Kiwi, has always held a deep desire to return to New Zealand, and makes plans for her dream home on a stunning site on Lake Wakatipu.
5	TBA	Waipara	17 April 2014	N/A
An award-winning city-based architect works on a property in the heart of South Island wine country – Waipara.
6	TBA	Ōtaki	24 April 2014	N/A
Two architects must understand their client's dream and their enthusiasm for Maoritanga: to create a building that is not only workable, but shrouded in meaning for a group of three iwi.
7	TBA	Grey Lynn	1 May 2014	N/A
Justine and Daniel's bungalow is falling apart. It's too costly to repair but unsafe for their young family, can our architect find a solution for this home in a heritage-protected street?
8	TBA	Auckland	8 May 2014	N/A
Three Auckland architects showcase examples of affordable architecturally-designed dream houses. Take a look at the bach kit and snake house, the shared bach concept, and the zero energy house.
