= Emily Devine =

Fictional character on Shortland Street

- Shortland Street character
- Portrayed by: Michaela Rooney
- Duration: 1995–1997, 2019–2020
- First appearance: 29 September 1995; Episode 860
- Last appearance: 7 July 2020
- Introduced by: Gavin Strawhan (1995); Maxine Fleming (2019)
In-universe information
- Occupation: Pathologist

Emily Devine is a fictional character on the New Zealand soap opera Shortland Street portrayed by Michaela Rooney. Appearing for two years in the mid 1990s, Rooney worked as a storyliner for 20 years on the soap before returning on screen in 2019.

== Creation and casting ==
Michaela Rooney was cast as Emily and first appeared on Shortland Street in late 1995 as a potential love interest for original cast member Chris Warner (Michael Galvin), though once debuting this romance storyline was altered to be platonic. Rooney left the show in 1997. In the year following her departure, Rooney began working behind-the-scenes as a storyliner and editor, becoming the first in a long line of ex-Shortland Street actors to pursue this. For 20 years following her departure, Rooney was offered a return to the role several times but declined.

In 2018 the show's story editor pitched a return storyline that would see Emily diagnosed with dementia and living homeless. Rooney agreed to return as this "really tugged at my heartstrings ... we could do this story with anybody but it does have an extra layer of poignancy because she was so brilliant and now she’s lost her marbles." She returned on-screen in an uncredited cameo as a homeless person who was pushed down 'The I.V. bar' stairs by hospital receptionist Leanne Miller (Jennifer Ludlam) in February 2019. The storyline was set to be a secret-reveal as to who the homeless person really was, so although Rooney was onscreen, she was not recognisable and future storylines were prepared to reveal Emily's identity. Rooney was "quite intimidated" by her return to the soap due to such a long absence. Originally the homeless person was set to be revealed as Emily after 6 months but Ludlam went on an extended break from the show and Rooney travelled overseas. Rooney eventually returned to set in March 2020 only for Prime Minister Jacinda Ardern to announce a nationwide lockdown that afternoon. Emily's return aired onscreen on 23 June 2020.

== Storylines ==
Emily arrived to the clinic as a new pathologist in late 1995 and immediately drew intrigue due to her odd and mild manner. No one was more interested than polar opposite and ex-medical school friend Chris Warner (Michael Galvin), who made it his mission to find Emily a man. The odd-duo ended up flatting together and developed a strong friendship and double act. Scandal hit the hospital when homeless boy Fergus Kearney (Paul Ellis) was hospitalised with blunt-force trauma and many suspected security guard Laurie Brasch (Chic Littlewood). Laurie was suspended from his job but all were shocked when Emily confessed that she had caught Fergus robbing her lab and hit him with her stethoscope. Emily clashed immensely with Chris' partner Tiffany Pratt (Alison James) but the two came to develop a close bond and she befriended the teenaged lab assistant Jonathon McKenna (Kieren Hutchison), whom she supported in his sexuality and HIV scare. She was briefly involved with Tiffany's brother Tyrone (David Gibson) before starting a relationship with Nigel towards the end of 1996, though she struggled with his illiteracy and left him. In 1997 Emily began to suffer from low self-confidence and started internet dating using Caroline Buxton's (Tandi Wright) identity as she believed no man would be attracted to her. This led to her falling in love with clinic doctor Gary Travis (Stuart Turner), who was shocked to discover Emily was behind the computer whilst he was dating Caroline in real-life. Emily began to investigate a mysterious spate of VCRA infections and worried all with her self-experimentation. Ultimately Gary realised he too was in love with Emily but departed Ferndale, leaving Emily to continue her research. Emily's self-research proved highly controversial, leading to severe moodswings and she resigned from the clinic in the aftermath. After uncovering a breakthrough medicine, Emily was headhunted for a pharmaceutical company in Switzerland.

In February 2019 'The I.V. Bar' owners Leanne Black (Jennifer Ludlam) and Damo Johnson (Grant Lobban) interrupted a homeless person wandering in the bar's upstairs hotel accommodation which lead to Leanne pushing them down the stairs. Fearing that they had died, the couple abandoned the body in the back-alleyway only for it to have disappeared the following day. 17 months later the couple were shocked when the homeless person arrived to the hospital and was identified by Chris Warner as his old friend Emily. Diagnosed with early-onset dementia, suffering significant memory loss and having been homeless for several years, Emily proved erratic at the hospital and escaped several times much to Leanne's horror at potentially exposing her stairway crime. During one of her escapes, Paramedic Eddie Adams (Rawiri Jobe) discovered her crouched over a man who had been stabbed, leading to speculation she was "The Creep" an anonymous assailant stealing body organs from homeless children around Ferndale. Emily escaped but suggested to hospital orderly Louis King (Henry Rolleston) she knew the true identity of "The Creep". She was later tracked down by Chris and Louis only to die, having been battered in the head presumably by "The Creep".

== Reception ==
The long running Shortland Street casting director Marianne Willison named Rooney's casting as Emily to be one of her favourite decisions. Rooney worked as a scriptwriter and editor 20 years after leaving the role and described the "fun" she had playing the character with a "bun, glasses, and a centre-part." The character was referred to by The New Zealand Herald as a previous portrayal of the "classic nerd" archetype with "memorable bad-hair-and-glasses boffins".

Emily's return and dementia diagnosis was praised and noted as an example of Shortland Street depicting social commentary within its storylines.
