= Chloe Smith (producer) =

New Zealand film and television producer

Chloe Smith CNZM
- Smith in 2026
- Born: United Kingdom
- Education: University of Otago; Massey University
- Occupations: Film and television producer

Chloe Smith CNZM is a New Zealand film and television producer. She has worked in the New Zealand screen industry since the early 1980s, on films including The Piano, The Power of the Dog, and Sione's Wedding.

== Early life and education ==
Smith was born in the United Kingdom, and moved to New Zealand with her family when she was aged 12, settling in Wellington. She trained as a scientist at the University of Otago and Massey University, and then worked in arts administration for a dance company and at Mercury Theatre in Auckland.

== Career ==
Smith has worked in the New Zealand screen industry for more than 43 years. Her involvement began after a chance meeting with Larry Parr, who needed a production secretary. Smith worked in this role on 1980s productions Pallet on the Floor, Came a Hot Friday and Shaker Run.

Smith has been involved in 47 major projects, including Academy Award-winning films The Piano and The Power of the Dog, and television series including Spartacus. She collaborated with American producers on Xena: Warrior Princess and Hercules: The Legendary Journeys. Smith has worked to promote local talent and storytelling, particularly as producer for Dark City – The Cleaner and Sione's Wedding. She helped establish the New Zealand Cinematographers' Society's gender diversity programme, which has placed 29 women in paid crew roles on professional productions and created pathways for women in the industry. She has been a member of the Screen Production and Development Association New Zealand (SPADA) and Women in Film and Television New Zealand (WIFTNZ). Smith has contributed to The Blue Book guidelines, a collaboration between SPADA and the Screen Industry Guild, outlining standard guidelines for screen production crews and allied crafts in New Zealand.

== Recognition ==
Smith was awarded the WIFTNZ Award for Outstanding Contribution to the New Zealand Screen Industry in 2006.

In the 2026 King's Birthday Honours, Smith was appointed a Companion of the New Zealand Order of Merit, for services to the screen industry.
