= After the Party (TV series) =

New Zealand six-part drama series

- Created by: Robyn Malcolm, with Dianne Taylor.
- Written by: Samuel E. Shore; Dianne Taylor
- Directed by: Peter Salmon
- Starring: Robyn Malcolm; Peter Mullan; Tara Canton; Ian Blackburn; Elz Carrad
- Country of origin: New Zealand
- No. of series: 1
- No. of episodes: 6

Production
- Executive producers: Robyn Malcolm; Jason Stephens; Dianne Taylor
- Producers: Peter Salmon; Helen Bowden; Liz DiFiore
- Running time: 6 x 45m
- Production companies: Lingo Pictures & Luminous Beast

Original release
- Network: TVNZ
- Release: 29 October – 3 December 2023

After the Party is a New Zealand six-part drama TV series co-created by Robyn Malcolm and Dianne Taylor, directed by Peter Salmon, and starring Robyn Malcolm and Peter Mullan. It aired on TVNZ from 29 October 2023.

== Synopsis ==
The story follows, partly through flashbacks, a family crisis that evolves following a drunken party, at which mother and grandmother Penny Wilding sees something which causes her to accuse her husband, Phil, in front of all of the guests, of inappropriate behaviour. The series begins when Phil, after having been overseas for five years, returns to town to see his daughter, Grace, and grandson, Walt.

== Cast ==
- Robyn Malcolm as Penny Wilding
- Peter Mullan as Phil MacKenzie
- Tara Canton as Grace MacKenzie
- Ian Blackburn as Ollie
- Elz Carrad as Tom
- Dean O'Gorman as Simon
- Catherine Wilkin as Joy Wilding
- Tanea Heke as Ruth
- Peter Hambleton as Graham

== Production ==
Extra funding came from the government in the wake of the COVID-19 pandemic in New Zealand. The series was produced by Lingo Pictures and Luminous Beast, and filmed on location in Wellington, New Zealand.

The series was co-created by Robyn Malcolm with writer Dianne Taylor.

== Release ==
After the Party aired on TVNZ from 29 October 2023.

It aired on ABC TV and iview in Australia from 28 April 2024, and the series achieved very good international distribution.

It was aired on Channel 4 in the UK from 20 November 2024.

Malcolm has said that there will not be a second series.

== Reception ==
The Spinoff reviewer Duncan Greive called the show "queasy, morally complex and NZ's best TV drama in years... a dark, tense and highly provocative drama which will rattle uneasily around your mind for days".

The Guardian reviewer Luke Buckmaster called Malcolm's acting "one of the greatest performances in any TV show in years".

Kylie Northover of The Sydney Morning Herald gave the series five stars, calling it "what might be the best New Zealand drama ever produced".

== Awards ==
Robyn Malcolm won the best actress award at Series Mania, France, for her role in the drama. The show was nominated for Best International Programme at the 2025 British Academy Television Awards.
