= Elisabeth Easther =

New Zealand actor, broadcaster and writer

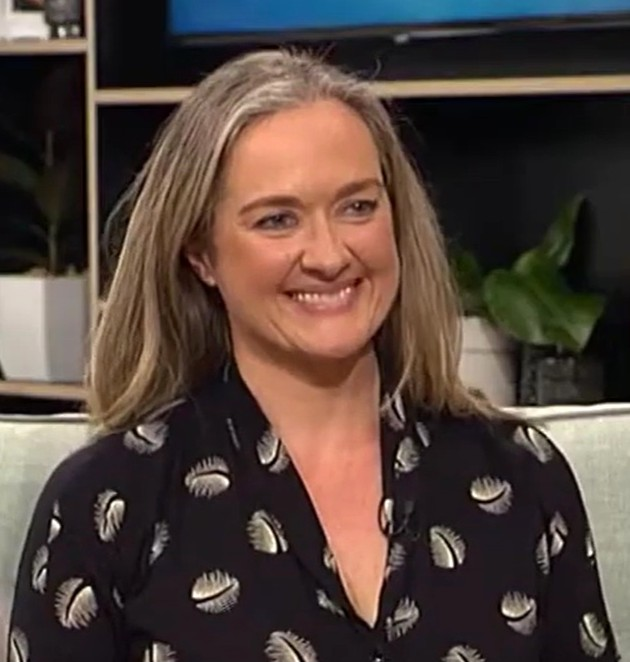
- Easther in 2017
- Born: 1970 (age 55–56); Hamilton, New Zealand
- Occupations: Actor; broadcaster; journalist; playwright; novelist
- Years active: 1993–present
- Known for: Shortland Street; Seed (play, 2014; novel, 2026)
- Children: 1
- Parent: Shirley Maddock

Elisabeth Easther (born 1970) is a New Zealand actor, broadcaster, journalist, playwright, and novelist. She played Carla Crozier on New Zealand soap opera Shortland Street from May 1995 to July 1996, and has since had a varied career in television, radio, journalism and playwriting. Her play Seed won the Adam NZ Play Award for Best Play in 2014. In 2026 she published a novel of the same name adapted from the play.

== Early life, education and family ==
Easther was born in Hamilton in 1970. She is the daughter of Shirley Maddock, New Zealand's first female television producer and pioneering broadcaster, and her husband Michael Easther, general practitioner. She attended Waikato Diocesan School for Girls.

Easther initially planned to study law at university, but ended up graduating from Victoria University of Wellington with a Bachelor of Arts in theatre and film. She subsequently attended drama school Toi Whakaari and graduated in 1992 with a Diploma in Performance. She has one son.

== Television and radio career ==
Easther's first notable acting role was in 1994 as the costume actor of a dinosaur called Victoria on the Australian children's television show Johnson and Friends.

Easther played the villainous character Carla Crozier on New Zealand soap opera Shortland Street, from May 1995 to July 1996. The character was notable for being the show's first murderer, and featured on one of the show's highest-rated episodes of all time, which aired on 31 May 1995 and was watched by nearly a quarter of the New Zealand population. In February 2021, Easther returned to Shortland Street to play Crozier (now Dr Carla Summerfield) on a short-term contract.

She has continued to act on television and in commercials, including playing the supporting role of Fran on the show Outrageous Fortune in series 3 and 4, and appearing on sketch comedy Funny Girls in 2016. Since March 2008 she has been a regular host on weekly radio show The Week That Was with fellow radio personality Te Radar for Radio New Zealand. Easther has also done voice-over work for the Power Rangers Jungle Fury television series and commercials for Whittaker's chocolate and Sky TV. She was the voice-over artist for the character The Maven in an update to the video game Path of Exile released in January 2021.

In 2018, Easther was the host of a remake of Islands in the Gulf, New Zealand's first documentary series, that had been produced and hosted by her mother in 1964. Easther visited islands in the Hauraki Gulf that her mother had visited and re-interviewed surviving interviewees. Reviewer Greg Bruce, writing in The New Zealand Herald, described it as a "a loving homage to the original", and "classic Kiwi heartland television set in an increasingly expensive bit of Auckland's waterscape".

== Writing career ==
Easther has written a number of plays, including Raw and Salt. Her play Famous Flora, about dress designer and brothel-owner Flora MacKenzie, was staged at Auckland adult entertainment venue the White House in November 2014. The New Zealand Herald review praised Easther's creation of "two incarnations of Flora", both as an older "fiercely independent woman with a shrewdly realistic understanding of the human condition", and her younger self "as a youthful entrepreneur who has embraced the liberation of gender roles and is swept up in the live-for-the-moment spirit of the war years".

Easther's play Seed, about four women's experiences of pregnancy, won the Adam NZ Play Award for Best Play in 2014, as well as Best Play by a Woman Playwright. It was described by the judges as "highly entertaining, funny and sophisticated". It premiered at the Basement Theatre in Auckland in June 2014, and was subsequently performed at the Circa Theatre in Wellington from 17 January to 14 February 2015. The New Zealand Herald described Seed as a "sophisticated, witty and very contemporary meditation on the timeless processes of procreation". In July 2018, a production toured New Zealand as part of an Arts On Tour NZ event, including performances in Auckland, at the BATS Theatre in Wellington, at the Isaac Theatre Royal in Christchurch and at a number of regional theatres.

In 2026, Easther published her first novel, Seed, based on the play. It appeared on the New Zealand bestseller book charts in its first week of publication. A review in The Spinoff comments that Easther "has a sharp, lucid awareness of the world around her, and recognises the ironies of living in a society where women are judged no matter what choices they make about their own bodies"; it concludes that the novel is "ripe with humour and heart".

Easther has written extensively as a journalist for The New Zealand Herald since 2012, as well as a book critic on radio and in print since 1993. She edited an anthology of fiction, non-fiction and poetry about New Zealand birds called Bird Words, published in 2017. The anthology features NZ authors such as Denis Glover, Hone Tuwhare, Janet Frame and Easther's mother, Shirley Maddock.
