= Far North (TV series) =

New Zealand Television series

- Created by: David White
- Written by: Underbelly: Inside NZ’s Biggest Meth Bust. by Jared Savage
- Screenplay by: David White; Mingjian Cui; Suli Moa
- Directed by: David White; Mingjian Cui
- Starring: Robyn Malcolm; Temuera Morrison
- Original language: English
- No. of series: 1
- No. of episodes: 6

Production
- Executive producers: David White; Kelly Martin
- Producers: Sally Campbell; Nicole Horan
- Cinematography: Adam Luxton
- Production companies: South Pacific Pictures; White Balance Pictures; All3Media

Original release
- Network: TV3 (New Zealand); Paramount+ (Australia)

Far North is a six-part comedy drama crime caper television series. Created by David White, who co-writes with Mingjian Cui and Suli Moa and co-directed with Cui, it is in-part inspired by Jared Savage's non-fiction book Underbelly: Inside NZ’s Biggest Meth Bust. It is produced by South Pacific Pictures, and White Balance Pictures and distributed internationally by All3Media International. It stars Robyn Malcolm and Temuera Morrison as a couple mixed up with an inept drug trafficking gang.

== Premise ==
Based on a true story, a regular couple in New Zealand get caught up with a major drug trafficking gang.

== Cast ==
- Robyn Malcolm as Heather
- Temuera Morrison as Ed
- Villa Junior Lemanu as Louie
- Maaka Pohatu as Stevie
- John-Paul Foliaki as Mack
- Albert Mateni as Gravel
- Fay Tofilau as Blaze
- Mosa Alipate Latailakepa as Thugga
- Fei Li as Cai
- Dennis Zhang as Sam
- Xana Tang as Bi
- Demetrius Schuster-Koloamatangi as Tall Guy
- Xiao Hu as Jin
- Xana Tang as Bi
- Nikita Tu-Bryant as Jin Hui
- Louise Jiang as Ling

== Production ==
The series is based on events in New Zealand from 2016, in which the largest ever drug bust in New Zealand, worth up to $150 million if sold in 1 kg lots, occurred in the town of Ahipara, at the base of Ninety Mile Beach where more than 500 kg of methamphetamine was discovered in a caravan and hidden in sand dunes. The story is also documented in the non-fiction book Underbelly: Inside NZ’s Biggest Meth Bust by Jared Savage, which provided information about the subsequent trial in which eight people were sent to prison for decades, having been foiled by a regular Kiwi couple.

The six-part series was created, written, and directed by documentary filmmaker David White. Upon hearing the story in 2016 White “drove to Ahipara and found the couple [Ed and Heather] and I just knocked on the door”. He bought the rights to Ed’s story that day. White moved to Ahipara while he wrote the screenplay, and spent time with the couple and in the community, walking their dogs on the beach.

White co-wrote with Mingjian Cui and Suli Moa. Cui also directed parts of the series. White and Kelly Martin executive produced. Martin described the budget as one of the biggest per-episode for a New Zealand television series.

=== Casting ===
The cast features a mix of stellar New Zealand names Robyn Malcolm and Temuera Morrison with a cluster of screen newcomers. The cast also includes Demetrius Schuster-Koloamatangi, JP Foliaki, Xiao Hu, Xana Tang, Nikita Tu-Bryant, Fei Li and Louise Jiang.

=== Filming ===
Filming took place over 14 weeks from the June of 2022. Half of those weeks were spent filming on location in Ahipara, the site of the 2016 drug bust by police. Production also took place in the Northland, Hawke’s Bay and Auckland.

== Broadcast ==
The show was broadcast on TV3 and streaming service ThreeNow in New Zealand, from 14 August 2023. It was shown on Paramount+ in Australia, and is due to appear on Sundance Now in the United States. It was a huge domestic success, holding the biggest weekly viewing figures for a drama on ThreeNow since it launched.
