= Dark City: The Cleaner =

2024 New Zealand TV series

- Genre: Crime fiction
- Written by: Paul Cleave; Rachel Lang; Simone Nathan; Gavin Strawhan
- Directed by: Rick Jacobson
- Starring: Cohen Holloway; Chelsie Preston Crayford; Dea Doglione; Elizabeth Hawthorne; Robbie Magasiva; David De Lautour; Hannah Marshall; Jordan Mooney
- Composers: David Donaldson; Plan 9; Steve Roche; Janet Roddick
- Country of origin: New Zealand
- Original language: English
- No. of series: 1

Production
- Executive producer: Rick Jacobson
- Producers: John Barnett; Chloe Smith; Andrew Marshall
- Cinematography: Andrew McGeorge
- Production company: Endeavour Ventures

Original release
- Network: Sky; Lionsgate
- Release: 4 March 2024

Dark City: The Cleaner is a New Zealand crime fiction television series based on author Paul Cleave's 2006 novel The Cleaner. The series was co-produced by John Barnett and Chloe Smith, with Cohen Holloway and Chelsie Florence starring as the two main characters Joe Middleton and Melissa Flowers. Dark City: The Cleaner was funded by Lionsgate, the New Zealand Film Commission, NZ On Air, Sky Television, and ChristchurchNZ's Screen CanterburyNZ fund. The series debuted on 4 March 2024 on Neon, Sky Go, and SoHo.

== Synopsis ==
By day, Joe is a cleaner at the police station; where no one notices him. But by night he has another line of work – a serial killer who has been dubbed The Christchurch Carver. When another woman is murdered in her own home, police suspect The Carver – but Joe knows it was not him. He sets out to find the copycat killer. But as he searches, he finds he is also being hunted – by an adversary who is more clever and more dangerous than he is.

== Cast ==
- Cohen Holloway as Joe Middleton
- Chelsie Florence as Melissa Flowers
- Dea Doglione as Sally Gelletly
- Elizabeth Hawthorne as Evelyn Middleton
- Robbie Magasiva as DI Carl Schroder
- David De Lautour as DSS Robert Calhoun
- Hannah Marshall as DSS Rebecca Kent
- Jordan Mooney as DS Brian Travers

== Episodes ==
No.	Title	Directed by	Written by	Original release date	New Zealand viewers (millions)
1	"Episode 1"	Rick Jacobson	Paul Cleave	4 March 2024	N/A
While working as a cleaner at the Christchurch police station by day, Joe Middleton lives a double life as a serial killer known as the "Christchurch Carver," targeting women. He also has a strained relationship with his mother Evelyn, who resents his perceived tardiness. By the time of the story, Joe has murdered six women and a man, the previous cleaner at the police station. When a seventh woman named Daniella Walker is killed, Joe eavesdrops on a conversation between DC Carl Schroder and his fellow detectives. After learning the killer left an object behind, Joe deduces that it is a copycat. While taking an abandoned cat to a veterinary, he meets an Auckland-based journalist named Melissa Flowers, who is investigating the Christchurch Carver's actions. Following a bus ride, Joe takes Melissa for a walk, intending to kill her. However, she turns the tables on him and reveals she has deduced his identity as the Christchurch Carver.
2	"Episode 2"	Rick Jacobson	Paul Cleave	4 March 2024	N/A
After subduing Joe, Melissa forces him to help her find the copycat killer. As a warning, Melissa crushes one of his testicles with a pair of plyers. Joe convinces Sally to treat his injuries and keep them a secret. Later, Melissa blackmails Joe into finding the copycat within two days or she will finish what she started. Returning to his workplace, Joe eavesdrops on DC Schroder and DSS Rebecca Kent discussing the Walker murder case. He infiltrates the Walker household and discovers clues suggesting the copycat killer was a Police officer. Meanwhile, Schroder believes that Daniella's husband abused and murdered her based on the postmortem showing multiple injuries over a period of time. Believing Schroder is the copycat killer, he decides to kill a woman named Laura with the intention of framing Schroder. However, he instead encounters a male friend, who was house-sitting Laura's home since she is on a holiday in Bali.
3	"Episode 3"	Rick Jacobson	Paul Cleave	4 March 2024	N/A
Joe escapes Laura's friend, who reports his description to the Police. Continuing his search for the copycat killer, Joe rules out Schroder. He stalks DSS Robert Calhoun but rules him out as a suspect after discovering he is in a homosexual relationship. Melissa gives him another chance to find the copycat killer. Joe then questions two prostitutes for information about the copycat killer. When the first prostitute realizes he is the Christchurch Carver, Joe kills her and burns a car to cover his tracks. Joe has more luck with the second prostitute, who reveals that a person matching the copycat killer's profile is a Police employee. When she becomes suspicious, Joe ends up killing her as well. Unknown to Joe, he is being tailed by another man. The mysterious man is also followed by Melissa, who kills him. Joe finds the remains of the mysterious man, later revealed to be Constable Sam, in the trunk of his car.
4	"Episode 4"	Rick Jacobson	Paul Cleave	4 March 2024	N/A
Joe dumps his car and the bodies of Constable Sam and the second prostitute outside DC Schroder's house. SI Dominique Stevens takes over the investigation from Schroder, who remains in a support role. Joe acquires another car and meets with Evelyn's new boyfriend Walt at a petrol station, who later meets with Joe and Evelyn for a family dinner. Resuming his search for the copycat, Joe narrows his suspects down to DSS Robert Calhoun and DS Brian Travers. Agreeing to help Joe, Melissa investigates the prostitute's death by questioning the motel owner Wendy who last saw her alive. Joe later finds that his pet fish have seemingly been killed by the "rescue" cat Karma. When the veterinary calls to inform him that the cat's owners have been found, Joe claims Karma was run over by a car. While burying his pet fish, Melissa meets up with Joe, having determined the copycat to be Calhoun. Joe spies on Calhoun but is ambushed by the detective.
5	"Episode 5"	Rick Jacobson	Paul Cleave	4 March 2024	N/A
Detective Calhoun questions why Joe is following him. Joe plays dumb, causing Calhoun to release him. Sally grows concerned about Joe and visits his mother Evelyn, who has trouble remembering details due to her medication. Joe infiltrates Calhoun's flat to find information and zip ties the cleaning lady after stealing her swipe card. With Melissa's help, Joe kills the motel owner Wendy and steals her two pet fish to replace his deceased pets. Using a cellphone, Joe stalks Calhoun and threatens to reveal his role in Daniella Walker's murder. Joe blackmails Calhoun into meeting him at a Christchurch address with a ransom of NZ$50,000. The two men tussel, with Calhoun gaining the upper hand.
6	"Episode 6"	Rick Jacobson	Paul Cleave	4 March 2024	N/A
Joe manages to knock out Detective Calhoun with a glass. Calhoun confesses to Joe and Melissa that he had been having an affair with Daniella and killed her following an argument. Melissa reveals that she has been impersonating her sister who was killed by another detective and that Calhoun helped cover up her murder. Melissa kills Calhoun. Meanwhile, Schroder and Kent question Sally about a ticket found near Wendy's remains, believing it can identify the Carver. She recalls it was under Joe's bed. Joe meets with Melissa to secure the return of his suitcase containing evidence of his murders. To conceal their secrets, Joe proposes to Melissa, which she accepts. Sally tries to warn Joe he is in trouble, when armed police surround them. Joe takes Sally hostage then attempts to kill himself with a pistol. However Sally intervenes, and Joe is only wounded. Joe is taken into custody and Melissa vows to rescue him. A montage shows his trial and imprisonment and hints that Melisssa is pregnant.

== Production ==
Dark City: Night Cleaner was co-produced by John Barnett and Chloe Smith. Cohen Holloway and Chelsie Florence were cast as the two main characters Joe Middleton and Melissa Flowers. Other cast members included David de Lautour and Dea Doglione.

Filming for the series commenced in Christchurch on 27 February 2023, with filming expected to be completed by May 2023. According to Screen CanterburyNZ manager Petrina D'Rozario, the production employed 100 crew members over the 100-day production period and spend NZ$3.5m in the Canterbury Region. Mayor of Christchurch Phil Mauger visited the production set on 27 March 2023.

The series was funded by Lionsgate, the New Zealand Film Commission's NZ$50 million Premium Productions for International Audiences Fund, NZ On Air, Sky Television and a NZ$200,000 regional production grant from ChristchurchNZ's Screen CanterburyNZ fund.

== Release ==
The series' first season debuted on 4 March 2024 on Neon, Sky Go and SoHo. Lionsgate handled the series' international distribution.

== Reception ==
The Spinoff's reviewer Duncan Greive gave Dark City: The Cleaner a positive review, describing it as "an eerie, pitch black and totally original Christchurch crime drama." He praised the performances of Cohen Holloway, Dea Doglione, and Chelsie Florence. Greive was critical of the occasional use of cliches' in the show's writing and the "deadpan" delivery of Holloway's narration scenes. Despite his criticisms, Greive praised the series' high production values, which he attributed to funding from central and local government film subsidies.

The Press's reviewer James Croot compared the protagonist Joe to Jeff Lindsay's character Dexter Morgan. He praised the series for its plot twists, black comedy and the performances of Holloway, Florence and Doglione.

Flicks.co.nz's reviewer Katie Parker gave the series a positive review, describing it as "an unexpectedly audacious and instantly addictive series that perfectly showcases Aotearoa's talent for taking dark subject matter to delicious new depths." Parker also described the series as a murder thriller underpinned by black comedy.

The New Zealand Herald's Karl Puschmann gave a positive review, writing that "the series does not squander this killer idea. It's unique and, due to its graphic nature and off-kilter premise, is quite an unexpected show to be made here. It's full of terrific performances, and having been shot on location around Christchurch, it feels distinctly Kiwi." He compared the series' serial killer premise to the American crime drama Dexter.
