= Meighan Desmond =

New Zealand actress

- Born: 7 October 1977 (age 49); Kaitaia, New Zealand

Meighan Desmond (born 7 October 1977) is a New Zealand actress, best known for her role as the Greek goddess Discord in the TV series Hercules: The Legendary Journeys and its two spin-offs – Xena: Warrior Princess and Young Hercules.

Desmond was born in Kaitaia, New Zealand. She has appeared in a number of New Zealand film and television projects, including the popular TV series Shortland Street. She also worked as a personal assistant to Ted Raimi during his final appearances on Xena.
