= Jay Ryan =

Jay Ryan may refer to:

- Jay Ryan (artist) (born 1972), artist and rock musician
- Jay Ryan (actor) (born 1981), New Zealand actor resident in Australia

== See also ==
- Thomas Jay Ryan (born 1962), actor
- Jason Ryan (baseball) (born 1976), former Major League pitcher for the Minnesota Twins
