= Timothy Bartlett =

New Zealand actor

Timothy Bartlett is a New Zealand stage, television and film actor who is best known for presenting TVNZ's Playschool in the 1980s.

Bartlett was the narrator, Kiwi, Pukeko and Rainbow Jackson in the series 1 and 2 of Bidi Bidi.

A notable role was Bernie Leach in Shortland Street in the mid-1990s. He first appeared in professional theatre for Auckland's Theatre Corporate in 1974. He has also appeared in An Angel at My Table, Soldier Soldier, The Tommyknockers, Duggan, Holby City, Out of the Blue, The Hobbit: An Unexpected Journey and The Hobbit: The Battle of the Five Armies.

== Filmography ==
Year	Title	Role	Notes
1990	An Angel at My Table	Gussy Dymock	
2000	The Shirt	Errol	
2001	The Lord of the Rings: The Fellowship of the Ring	Hobbit	Uncredited
2006	Out of the Blue	Jimmy Dickson	
2007	The Last Great Snail Chase	Miles	
2012	The Hobbit: An Unexpected Journey	Master Worrywort	
2014	The Hobbit: The Battle of the Five Armies	Master Worrywort	
2015	Ghost Shark 2: Urban Jaws	Gerald Morgan	
