= Peter Elliott (New Zealand actor) =

New Zealand actor

Peter Elliott ONZM
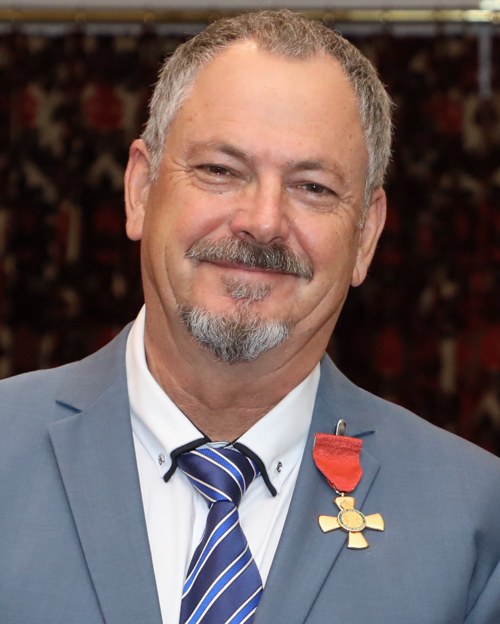
- Elliott in 2021
- Born: Peter Dennis Elliott; 1956 or 1957 (age 68–69); Christchurch, New Zealand
- Occupations: Actor; television presenter
- Years active: 1987–present

Peter Dennis Elliott ONZM (born 1956 or 1957) is a New Zealand actor. He has appeared in numerous television shows including Shortland Street, Gloss and Homeward Bound. He has also appeared in several movies including Heavenly Creatures. He has a daughter Lucy Elliott who is an actress, who played character Dayna Jenkins on Shortland Street from 2013 to 2016.

== Early life ==
Elliott was born in the Christchurch suburb of Upper Riccarton, and was educated at Linwood High School. He was involved in amateur dramatics in Christchurch, and found work in set construction for television when he was 22. He joined the Court Theatre in Christchurch in 1981, aged 25.

== Shortland Street ==
Elliott played a pivotal role as Dr David Kearney, clinic director. In this era of Shortland Street, storylines were externally driven, with challenges and topical events emanating from Central (Hospital), the Ministry (of Health), and the wider community.

Along with key characters Rachel McKenna and Dr Chris Warner, the character of Dr David Kearney formed one of the key anchors of the show.

== Get Ready, Get Thru campaign ==
Elliott fronted the Get Ready, Get Thru campaign for NZ Civil Defence. This was a national television campaign, for which he was selected as the spokesperson.

== Other work ==
Becoming widely known first on 1980s soap Gloss, Elliott was nominated for 'Best Actor' playing the scheming character Rex Redfern. Gloss was a seminal New Zealand drama and soap opera, one of the first local productions to achieve New Zealand-wide fame and audience. In 1987 he appeared in the TVNZ mini-series Erebus: The Aftermath.

Winning a Qantas award for 2009 telemovie Until Proven Innocent, he was also nominated Best Presenter at the TV Guide Television Awards 2002 for Captain's Log. He has appeared in a number of films. He won 'Best Presenter' Award at the 2015 Film and TV Awards for "Explorers" series for TVOne.

Elliott has a long-standing career on stage, performing for over 40 years. He works frequently with directors such as Simon Prast, Elric Hooper, Jonathan Hardy, Raymond Hawthorne and Shane Bosher.

He was also the corporate voice for New Zealand's leading talk radio station Newstalk ZB up until 2011. In 2014, Elliott was the presenter of The Art of The Architect, a TVNZ-commissioned series detailing local architectural projects.

Elliott served as vice-president of the Central City Baseball Club in Auckland from 2010 to 2013. He became a Baseball New Zealand board member in 2012, and was involved in the establishment of the Auckland Tuatara professional baseball team.

In the 2021 New Years Honours, Elliott was appointed an Officer of the New Zealand Order of Merit, for services to the performing arts and baseball.

In the 2025 local elections, Elliot was elected to the Waitematā Local Board on the City Vision ticket.
