= Robyn Malcolm =

New Zealand actress (born 1965)

Robyn Malcolm MNZM
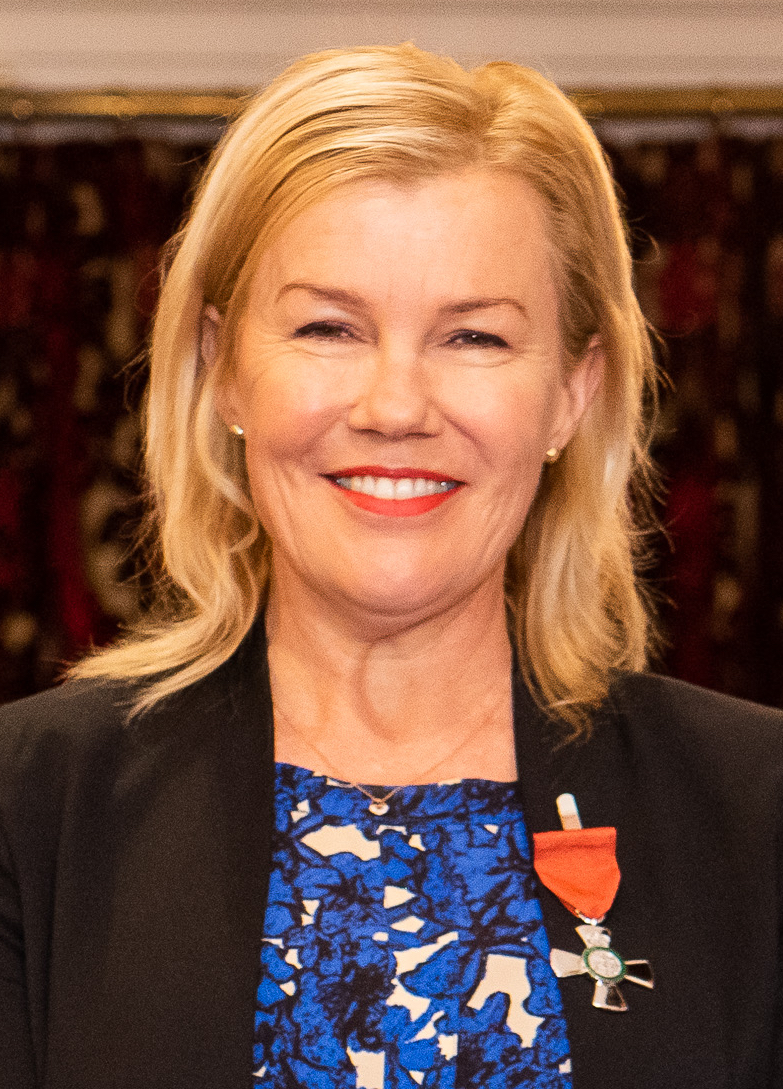
- Malcolm in 2019
- Born: 1965 (age 60–61); Ashburton, Canterbury, New Zealand
- Education: Toi Whakaari
- Occupation: Actor
- Years active: 1988–present
- Relatives: Roger Sutton (brother-in-law)

Robyn Jane Malcolm MNZM (born 1965) is a New Zealand actress, who first gained recognition for her role as nurse Ellen Crozier on the soap opera Shortland Street. She is best known for playing Cheryl West, matriarch to a sometimes criminal working-class family, in the television series Outrageous Fortune. She has also worked in Australia, including roles in the TV series Rake and Upper Middle Bogan. She plays the lead role in the six-part 2023 NZ drama After the Party.

== Early life and education ==
Robyn Jane Malcolm was born in 1965 in Ashburton, New Zealand.

She attended Ashburton College, and graduated from Toi Whakaari (New Zealand Drama School) with a Diploma in Acting in 1987.

== Career ==
Malcolm's first long-running television role was nurse Ellen Crozier in soap opera Shortland Street. She appeared on the show for over five years.

She played the lead role in television feature, Clare, based on the cervical cancer experiment at Auckland's National Women's Hospital which resulted in the Cartwright Inquiry.

In 1999, Malcolm was one of the founding members of the New Zealand Actors' Company along with Tim Balme, Katie Wolfe, and Simon Bennett. The company produced and toured a number of successful stage productions throughout New Zealand.

In 2005, Malcolm took on the role of Cheryl West, matriarch of the West family, in Outrageous Fortune. Mixing comedy and drama, the show became one of the highest-rated and most honoured in New Zealand history.

Malcolm co-starred in 2010 feature film The Hopes and Dreams of Gazza Snell, playing mother to a family obsessed with go-karting and motorsports. She has also had small roles in movies Absent Without Leave directed by John Laing, The Last Tattoo directed by John Reid, Gaylene Preston's Perfect Strangers, and Christine Jeffs' Sylvia. She had a minor role as Morwen in the second film of the Lord of the Rings trilogy.

She played Kirsty Corella in the Australian television series Rake, and Julie Wheeler in Upper Middle Bogan.

She plays Mrs Keene on the 2023 drama series Black Bird.

Malcolm plays the lead role in the six-part drama After the Party, which aired on TVNZ from 29 October 2023. The Guardian reviewer Luke Buckmaster called it "one of the greatest performances in any TV show in years".

On 31 January 2025, Malcolm was named in the cast for Netflix series The Survivors. On 29 January 2026, Malcolm was named in the cast for Stan Australia co-commissioned series Careless.

== Recognition, awards, and honours ==
Malcolm was nominated for Best Actress at the 1998 TV Guide Television Awards for her work in Shortland Street. She was nominated again for her role in Clare.

In 2003, Malcolm won an International Actors Fellowship at the Globe Theatre in London.

For her role in Outrageous Fortune, Malcolm won several television awards, including the Qantas TV Awards for Best Actress in 2005 and 2008, TV Guide Best Actress in 2006, 2007, 2008, 2009, 2010 and 2011 and Air NZ Screen Awards Best Actress in 2007.

Malcolm won the Woman's Day Readers' Choice Award for Favourite New Zealand Female Personality in 2005, and New Zealand's sexiest woman at the 2007 TV Guide Best on the Box awards.

In the 2019 Queen's Birthday Honours, Malcolm was appointed a Member of the New Zealand Order of Merit, for services to television and theatre.

In March 2024 she was honoured with a Best Actress accolade at the Series Mania film festival in Lille, France. She received this prestigious award in the International Panorama section for her outstanding performance in After the Party, a series she co-created with writer Dianne Taylor. This recognition marked a significant milestone as the first time a New Zealand entry had been considered for an award at the festival.

== Filmography ==
=== Films ===
Year	Title	Role	Notes
1992	Absent Without Leave	Betty	
1994	The Last Tattoo	Working girl	
2002	The Lord of the Rings: The Two Towers	Morwen	
2003	Perfect Strangers	Aileen	
2003	Sylvia	1st woman at Ted Hughes' lecture	
2005	Boogeyman	Dr. Matheson	
2009	The Lovely Bones	Foreman's wife	uncredited
2010	The Hopes & Dreams of Gazza Snell	Gail Snell	
2011	Burning Man	Kathryn Dent	
2013	Drift	Kat Kelly	
2015	Dream Baby	Marianne	Short film
2016	Edith	Barmaid	Short film
2017	Goodness Grows Here	Trish	Short film
2017	Hostiles	Minnie McGowan	
2018	Twenty One Points	Mum	Short film
2018	Charmer	Woman	Short film
2020	This Town	Pam	
2024	The Moon Is Upside Down	Hilary	
2025	Pike River	Sonya Rockhouse	

Key
†	Denotes films that have not yet been released

=== Television ===
Year	Title	Role	Notes
1989	Shark in the Park	Janice	Guest role (1 episode)
1990–91	Shark in the Park	Janet Finn	Guest role (2 episodes)
1992	Married	Maddie	
1993	Joyful & Triumphant	Raewyn	Television film
1994–99	Shortland Street	Ellen Crozier	Main role (600 episodes)
1999	The Tribe	Ma'am	Guest role (1 episode)
2000	Clare	Clare Matheson	Television film
2000	Op' Stars	Narrator	Television documentary
2001	Atlantis High	Violet Profusion	Guest role (1 episode)
2002	How's Life?	Panellist	Recurring
2003	Mercy Peak	Liz	Guest role (2 episodes)
2003	Intrepid Journeys	Herself	1 episode
2004	Serial Killers	Pauline	Lead role (7 episodes)
2005–10	Outrageous Fortune	Cheryl West	Lead role
2009	bro'Town	Herself	1 episode
2009	Big Night In	Herself	Television special
2009	The Jaquie Brown Diaries	Herself	Guest (1 episode)
2010–14	Rake	Kirsty Corella	Recurring role (11 episodes)
2013	Top of the Lake	Anita	Main role (series 1; 7 episodes)
2013–14	Agent Anna	Anna Kingston	Lead role; also executive producer
2013–16	Upper Middle Bogan	Julie Wheeler	Main role
2014	Charlotte: A Life Without Limbs	Presenter	Television documentary
2015	The Brokenwood Mysteries	Ruth Phelps	Episode: "To Die or Not to Die"
2015	The Principal	Sonya	Guest role (1 episode)
2016–18	Wanted	Donna Walsh	Recurring role (10 episodes)
2016	The Code	Marina Baxter	Main role (series 2: 6 episodes)
2017	Wake in Fright	Ursula Hynes	miniseries
2018–21	Harrow	Maxine Pavich	Main role
2018	Olivia Newton-John: Hopelessly Devoted to You	Irene Newton-John	miniseries
2018–19	The Outpost	Elinor	Main role (season 1–2: 23 episodes)
2021	My Life is Murder	Tamara Innes	Episode : "Call of the Wild"
2022	Black Bird	Sammy Keen	Recurring role
2023	Far North	Heather	Main role (season 1)
2023	After the Party	Penny Wilding	Main role
2024	Heartbreak High	Cait White	Guest role (Season 2, Episode 5)
2025	The Survivors	Verity Elliott	TV series
2025	Mystery Road: Origin	Sgt Simmo	Main role (season 2: 6 episodes)
2026	Run	Thelma Abbott	Co-star (6 part Australian mini series)
TBA	Careless	Angela	TV series

Key
†	Denotes television series that have not yet been aired

== Theatre ==
Year	Title	Role	Theatre
1988	The Threepenny Opera	Lucy Brown	Downstage Theatre
1988	The Rivers of China	Various	Downstage Theatre
1988	Les Liaisons Dangereuses	Cecile de Valonges	Downstage Theatre
1988	Judy	Various	Downstage Theatre
1988	Jones & Jones	Ida Baker	Downstage Theatre
1988	Gulls	Puppeteer	Downstage Theatre
1989	Twelfth Night	Viola	BATS Theatre
1989	The House of Bernarda Alba	Martirio	Downstage Theatre
1989	Othello	Bianca	Downstage Theatre
1989	Aunt Daisy	Various	Downstage Theatre
1990	Sweet Nothings	Various	NZ Tour
1990	Serious Money	Mary Lou Baines / Various	Downstage Theatre
1990	Macbeth	Ross / Hecate	Downstage Theatre
1990	Hamlet	Ophelia	BATS Theatre
1990	The End of the Golden Weather	Various	Downstage Theatre
1990	Conquest of the South Pole	La Braukman	BATS Theatre
1991	Weed	Raewyn	Circa Theatre
1991	Via Satellite	Chrissy	Circa Theatre
1991	The Importance of Being Earnest	Cecily Cardew	Downstage Theatre
1991	Songs for Uncle Scrim	Various	Circa Theatre
1991	A Pack of Girls	Raewyn	Downstage Theatre
1993	Two Weeks with the Queen	Various	Circa Theatre
1993	Lettice and Lovage	Miss Farmer	Circa Theatre
1995	Othello	Emilia	Watershed Theatre
1999	Much Ado About Nothing	Beatrice	Downstage Theatre
2000	Cat on a Hot Tin Roof	Maggie the Cat	Downstage Theatre
2000	A Midsummer Night's Dream	Titania	NZ Actors Company
2001	A Way of Life	Jenny	NZ Actors Company
2001	A Midsummer Night's Dream	Titania	NZ Actors Company
2002	Middle-Age Spread	Judy	Auckland Theatre Company
2002	Queen Leah	Kent / Caius	NZ Actors Company
2005	The Duchess of Malfi	Cariolla	Auckland Theatre Company
2007	The Cut	Susan	Silo Theatre
2010	Happy Days	Winnie	Silo Theatre
2014	The Good Person of Szechwan	Shen Teh	Auckland Theatre Company

== Personal life ==
Malcolm was formerly married to Allan Clark and has two sons. She is in a relationship with Scottish actor Peter Mullan, whom she met while filming Top of the Lake in 2013. Her sister is married to Roger Sutton, the former CEO of the Canterbury Earthquake Recovery Authority.

=== Activism ===
Malcolm voiced Green Party of Aotearoa New Zealand advertisements for the New Zealand general election, 2008.

Malcolm has helped spearhead an actors' union campaign to negotiate standard contracts for actors in The Hobbit films. The producers refused, saying that collective bargaining would be considered price-fixing and therefore illegal under New Zealand law. The situation escalated into international calls for an actors' boycott of the films, but the boycott was called off. Several days later, the producers said they were considering moving the films to another country as they could not be guaranteed stability in New Zealand.
