= List of Shortland Street characters introduced in 2009 =

The following is a list of characters that first appeared in the New Zealand soap opera Shortland Street in 2009, by order of first appearance.

== Grant Marsden ==
Grant Marsden
- Shortland Street character
- Portrayed by: Alan Lovell
- Duration: 2009
- First appearance: 10 February 2009
- Last appearance: 27 February 2009
- Introduced by: Steven Zanoski
In-universe information
- Wife: Annette Freeman (until 1999)
- Daughters: Brooke RollestonBree Hamilton

Grant Marsden was Brooke Freeman's (Beth Allen) fraudster father who abandoned her and her mother in the late nineties following embezzling thousands of people's money. He arrived in February 2009 to support Brooke following her arrest for murdering Ethan Pierce (Owen Black). Brooke refused to see her father but with the help of Kieran Mitchell (Adam Rickitt), successfully frauded Grant out of thousands of dollars by pretending to perform surgery on a previously undiagnosed heart problem. Grant fell for the scam and thanked Brooke before leaving.

== Gabrielle Jacobs ==
Dr. Gabrielle Jacobs was the eccentric love interest for Chris Warner (Michael Galvin) with Asperger syndrome. She was portrayed by Virginie Le Brun until 2010 and for another stint from 2011 to 2012.

== Tai Scott ==
Tai Scott
- Shortland Street character
- Portrayed by: Xavier Horan
- Duration: 2009–10
- First appearance: 6 March 2009
- Last appearance: 5 May 2010
- Introduced by: Steven Zanoski (2009, 2010)
In-universe information
- Father: Jimmy Scott
- Mother: Hine Ryan
- Brothers: James Scott
- Sisters: Rebecca Scott
- Nephews: Jessie Scott; Kitu Scott (adoptive)
- Nieces: Amy Scott

Patrick Tai "Paddy" Scott was the convict younger brother of Scotty (Kiel McNaughton). He had finished his stint in prison for armed robbery when Scotty's wife, Shanti Kumari (Nisha Madhan), gave permission for the paroled Tai to stay at the newly wed's house. Scotty was infuriated and the lazy Tai soon began to intimidate Shanti, going so far as to give the impression he was going to rape her. Tai's negative attitude soon changed when he met Tracey Morrison (Sarah Thomson) and was inspired to learn to read English. However the arrival of his former criminal colleague Vince "Pigdog" Laws (Andre King) proved poorly for him, when Pigdog convinced him to participate in an armed robbery where a man was seriously injured. A betrayed Tracey turned Tai in, sending Scotty into depression. Scotty and Tracey visited Tai in prison the following year and when a prisoner riot broke out, Tai was cautious to help the two escape when he discovered they had feelings for each other. However his good side was again shown and he helped an injured man, only to get shot by a gun squad. In hospital he gave his blessing to Scotty and Tracey and was later returned to prison.

== Thomas Denton ==
Thomas Denton
- Shortland Street character
- Portrayed by: Mark Mitchinson
- Duration: 2009
- First appearance: 14 May 2009
- Last appearance: 26 May 2009
- Introduced by: Steven Zanoski
In-universe information
- Sons: Kip Denton
- Nephews: Mark Denton; Alex Denton
- Nieces: Poppy Denton

Dr. Thomas Denton was Kip's (Will Hall) overbearing father. He arrived in mid-2009 for a conference and tried to force Kip to grow up. Despite at first listening to his father, Kip realised it was important to stay true to who he was and kicked his father out.

== The Watson triplets ==
Catherine, Elizabeth and William Watson
- Shortland Street character
- Portrayed by: Uncredited
- Duration: 2009
- First appearance: 3 June 2009
- Last appearance: 5 June 2009
- Introduced by: Steven Zanoski
In-universe information
- Father: Trent Watson
- Mother: Cindy Watson; Morgan Braithwaite (surrogate)
- Grandfathers: William Miller
- Grandmothers: Catherine Braithwaite; Ian Watson
- Uncles: Eric Miller
- Aunts: Nicole Miller

Catherine, Elizabeth and William Watson were the triplets that Morgan Braithwaite (Bonnie Soper) surrogated for her friends Cindy (Sarah McLeod) and Trent (John Glass). However Morgan realised they were unsuitable parents and decided to mother the children with her boyfriend Gerald Tippett (Harry McNaughton). Morgan gave birth to the children on 3 June 2009 and shocked all when she announced she was giving the triplets to the Watsons.

== Jack Fisher ==
Jack "Fish" Fisher
- Shortland Street character
- Portrayed by: Stephen Handisides
- Duration: 2009
- First appearance: 8 June 2009
- Last appearance: 16 June 2009
- Introduced by: Steven Zanoski

Jack "Fish" Fisher was Kip Denton's (Will Hall) old friend. He arrived in Ferndale to catch up with Kip but was left disappointed when Kip was busy with his new commitment as head of ED. He instead started to hang out with Alice Piper (Toni Potter) and the two later left to Rarotonga with Kips' tickets he won in a raffle. Fish and Alice started a holiday romance but when it came to leaving the country, Fish left Alice behind when she decided she was in love with Kip.

== Naomi Stephens ==
Naomi Stephens
- Shortland Street character
- Portrayed by: Christina Bristaw
- Duration: 2009
- Appears on: 16 June 2009
- Introduced by: Steven Zanoski

Dr. Naomi Stephens was the Cook Islander doctor who was running a clinic in Rarotonga. She met Kip Denton (Will Hall) whilst he was on holiday there and the two soon started a romance. However Naomi revealed she was leaving to America and offered her job to Kip who accepted.

== Aroha Reed ==
Aroha Reed
- Shortland Street character
- Portrayed by: Geneva Alexander-Marsters
- Duration: 2009
- First appearance: 19 June 2009
- Last appearance: 17 September 2009
- Introduced by: Steven Zanoski

Aroha Reed was the slacker, party-girl nurse who arrived to the hospital in mid-2009. Aroha hated nursing and fell into it when her singing career did not take off. Many of the staff disliked Aroha due to her lazy nature and arrogant behaviour, however Hunter McKay (Lee Donoghue) fell for her. Aroha was insulted when Gerald (Harry McNaughton) accused her of burglary but finally settled down and accepted her career as a nurse. However the arrival of rapper - Savage to the hospital saw Aroha be offered a singing contract and she suddenly left to perform on a cruise ship.

== Maxwell Avia ==
Maxwell Avia
- Shortland Street character
- Portrayed by: Robbie Magasiva
- Duration: 2009–12, 2015
- First appearance: 19 June 2009
- Last appearance: 2 September 2015
- Introduced by: Steven Zanoski (2009); Simon Bennett (2015)
In-universe information
- Occupation: Head of Emergency Department (2009–12)
- Wife: Vasa Levi (1995–2001)
- Stepdaughters: Ula Levi
- Grandsons: Adam Vailalo
- Uncles: Tafafao Kruse
- Aunts: Mary Faasavalu
- First cousins: Isaiah Avia; Vinnie Kruse-Miller; Selina Avia

Dr. Maxwell Avia appeared in a regular role for 3 years, portrayed by Robbie Magasiva. He appeared until 13 July 2012 and though he was primarily involved in drama story lines, the actor's comedy background allowed Maxwell to delve into humorous scenes. Magasiva reprised the role for a guest stint in 2015 for his brother's (and on-screen cousin) wedding.

Maxwell was hired to replace Kip Denton (Will Hall) as head of the Emergency Department. Despite initial chemistry with Tania Jeffries (Faye Smythe), Maxwell began to date Tracey Morrison (Sarah Thomson). However, when the extent of Maxwell's gambling addiction came to light, Tracey broke it off and Maxwell rebounded with Sarah Potts (Amanda Billing). He clashed with her ex-husband TK Samuels (Benjamin Mitchell) and the relationship ended when Maxwell's daughter Ula Levi (Frankie Adams) arrived and brought along Maxwell's ex-wife Vasa Levi (Teuila Blakely) Vasa seduced Maxwell and they slept together, Sarah was willing to forgive him but shortly after agreed with him it was never going to work due to their feelings for their former partners. In 2011 Maxwell began to date Nicole (Sally Martin) but cheated on her with Bethany Hall (Michelle Langstone). Nicole and Maxwell broke up before briefly reconciling and ending it for good in 2012. Maxwell struggled to deal with the news that Ula was pregnant but following the birth accepted a job in Hong Kong and departed in July. Ula and Vinnie (Pua Magasiva) visited Maxwell the following year. Maxwell unexpectedly returned in September 2015 to attend Vinnie's wedding to Nicole, announcing his new celebrant's license and officiating the ceremony.

== Joan Pierce ==
Joan Pierce
- Shortland Street character
- Portrayed by: Tina Greenville
- Duration: 2009
- Appears on: 22 June 2009
- Introduced by: Steven Zanoski
In-universe information
- Sons: Ethan Pierce

Joan Pierce appeared for a single episode in June 2009. She was Ethan's (Owen Black) mother and was at the trial of Maia Jeffries (Anna Jullienne), who had murdered him. Brooke (Beth Allen) took Joan as a companion to guilt Maia into retaining her guilty plea, however Joan felt sorry for Maia and sympathised with her mother Yvonne (Alison Quigan) as both their children had killed.

== Ben Goodall ==
Ben Goodall
- Portrayed by: Shaun Edwards-Brown
- Duration: 2009–10
- First appearance: 15 July 2009
- Last appearance: 8 June 2010
- Introduced by: Steven Zanoski
In-universe information
- Occupation: Paramedic
- Sisters: Emily Goodall; Anita Goodall

Ben Goodall was the optimistic paramedic who met Yvonne Jeffries (Alison Quigan) during a bank heist in mid-2009. The two bonded over the accident and Ben soon started to date Yvonne's daughter Tania Jeffries (Faye Smythe). However the polar opposite relationship did not last and it soon became clear Ben was more interested in Yvonne than Tania. The two eventually began to date in private and went public with the relationship in December, disgusting Tania. The two moved in together but many began to suspect Ben of being a gold digger when his ex who was a similar age to Yvonne, Heather Sloane (Jan Saussey) arrived. Ben proposed to Yvonne but instead of marrying, the two had a huge party. Whilst driving Hunter McKay (Lee Donoghue) to the supermarket, Ben was assaulted by a small gang of hoodlums and later it was discovered he had a brain hemorrhage. He fell brain dead and after several arguments between Yvonne and his sister Anita (Lara Fischel-Chisholm) as to whether he would come back alive or not, his life support was turned off a week later.

== Oliver Ritchie ==
Oliver Ritchie
- Shortland Street character
- Portrayed by: Mark Warren
- Duration: 2009
- First appearance: 20 September 2009
- Last appearance: 24 November 2009
- Introduced by: Steven Zanoski
In-universe information
- Occupation: Doctor

Dr. Oliver Ritchie was the mentally ill doctor who performed experiments on his colleagues. He moved into Scotty (Kiel McNaughton) and Shanti's (Nisha Madhan) spare room but gained attention with his strange habits. He helped Shanti when she fell sick but Scotty believed his healing was borderline cruelty. Shanti soon died and Oliver moved in with Libby (Fleur Saville) and Gerald (Harry McNaughton). He began to date Libby and conned her into spending a week with him at home, where he purposely infected her with dengue fever and recorded the results. Scotty discovered Oliver was behind his wife's death and freed Libby before savagely beating Oliver. In December, Gerald announced that Oliver had been imprisoned for his crimes.

== Nicole Miller ==
Nicole Miller first appeared in September 2009 as a potential love interest for Maia Jeffries (Anna Jullienne). She is portrayed by Sally Martin.

== Howard Carter ==
Howard Carter
- Shortland Street character
- Portrayed by: Ross Anderson
- Duration: 2009
- First appearance: 6 November 2009
- Last appearance: 11 November 2009
- Introduced by: Steven Zanoski

Howard Carter was the grandfather of a patient in the hospital who quickly fell for receptionist Yvonne Jeffries (Alison Quigan). Yvonne was not interested in Howard but started seeing him to hide her affections for the much younger Ben Goodall (Shaun Edwards-Brown). Yvonne and Howard were about to set out on a holiday when Yvonne learned Ben had been injured and left Howard devastated when she admitted she was not interested in him.

== Sean Mitchell ==
Sean Mitchell
- Shortland Street character
- Portrayed by: Thijis Morris
- Duration: 2009–10
- First appearance: 19 November 2009
- Last appearance: 3 August 2010
- Introduced by: Steven Zanoski (2009, 2010)
In-universe information
- Other names: Sid Mitchell; Sven
- Father: Sidney Mitchell
- Brothers: Sid Mitchell Jnr; Kieran Mitchell

Sean Thomas Mitchell was the manipulative brother of Kieran Mitchell (Adam Rickitt). He proved a thorn in Kieran and Sophie's (Kimberley Crossman) romance when he arrived under the name "Sid", so as to claim ownership of "The IV" bar. Kieran paid his ignorant brother to leave, but he returned shortly after, having started a strip club business. In 2010 Sean soon realised that Kieran had killed Morgan Braithwaite (Bonnie Soper) and took the blame for the killing from the police shortly before fleeing the country. Kieran heard the news that Sean had died in July 2010 only to discover days later Sean was alive and being held captive by White Dragon (Matt Sunderland) as a lure for Kieran. Sean and Kieran escaped however and ended up on a cliffside where White Dragon fell to his death. Kieran admitted to the death of Morgan to her sister Nicole (Sally Martin) and ex-husband Gerald Tippett (Harry McNaughton) before sacrificing himself so that Sean lived. Sean was later sent back to the United Kingdom.

The role was created specifically for Morris after he auditioned for a separate role.

== Jeremy Tyler ==
Jeremy Tyler
- Shortland Street character
- Portrayed by: Eryn Wilson
- Duration: 2009
- First appearance: 3 December 2009
- Last appearance: 7 December 2009
- Introduced by: Steven Zanoski
In-universe information
- Wife: Rachel McKenna (2007–14)

Jeremy Tyler was an internet entrepreneur. When Rachel (Angela Bloomfield) returned in 2007, she bragged to Chris Warner (Michael Galvin) that the two were engaged but admitted that she did not love him. In 2009 when Chris noticed Rachel was having severe problems with her alcohol, he contacted Jeremy and brought him to Ferndale. Jeremy was keen to restart the marriage whilst Rachel was not and when Jeremy discovered Chris and Rachel had slept together whilst he was engaged to her, he physically attacked Chris. Jeremy later offered a reconciliation to Rachel but she declined and they decided to sell their house. In January 2014, Rachel travelled to Wellington to finalize her divorce with Jeremy.
