= Yvonne Jeffries =

- Shortland Street character
- Portrayed by: Alison Quigan
- Duration: 2004–2012, 2026-
- First appearance: 18 November 2004
- Introduced by: Harriet Crampton (2004, 2005); Steven Zanoski (2012); Oliver Driver (2026)
In-universe information
- Occupation: Officer manager Receptionist
- Mother: Phyllis Gregory
- Sisters: Eileen Horrocks; Janice Gregory
- Husband: Ian Jeffries (1976–2006)
- Sons: Hamish Flynn
- Daughters: Maia Jeffries; Libby Jeffries; Tania Jeffries
- Grandsons: Peter Flynn; Jay Jeffries
- Granddaughters: Amber Flynn
- Grandfathers: Horace Gregory
- Nephews: Richard Horrocks; Simon Horrocks
- Nieces: Anna Horrocks

Yvonne Jeffries (previously Gregory) is a fictional character on the New Zealand soap opera Shortland Street, portrayed by Alison Quigan across multiple stints. Initially introduced as a guest character in 2004, Yvonne joined the regular cast the following year, remaining for six years before making guest appearances in 2012 and 2026.

Yvonne arrived as the mother of established character and nurse Maia Jeffries (Anna Jullienne), alongside her husband Ian (Jeffrey Thomas). A warm and maternal figure, her early storylines centred on coming to terms with Maia's sexuality and supporting Ian through his degenerative illness. As the wider Jeffries family was introduced, Yvonne became a central character in the series, taking a job as the hospital receptionist. Over her six years as a regular cast member, her storylines encompassed workplace politics, family conflicts involving her three daughters, romantic relationships, a cancer diagnosis and the discovery of her long-lost son.

Yvonne's prominent storylines and optimistic personality helped establish her as an iconic character, while the Jeffries family unit proved popular with both audiences and critics.

== Creation and casting ==
Alison Quigan was approached by producers to take on the role of Yvonne, the mother of established character, Maia Jeffries (Anna Jullienne). Quigan was delighted at the idea of full-time acting and accepted. In 2010 Alison Quigan quit Shortland Street following the departures of two of the three Jeffries girls, Tania (Faye Smythe) and Libby (Faye Saville), she believed, "The family had come to a finish. It was time for the show to move onto another family and me onto other projects." She later went on to state the family had "run out of steam" and questioned the number of affairs Yvonne was depicted to indulge in. The news was announced publicly in January 2011, with Yvonne making her final appearance as a regular character on 9 February 2011. The storyline saw her accept a job offer from best friend Shobna Kumari and move to Australia. Whilst planning for the show's 20th anniversary in 2012, producers sought to bring back fan favourite characters and development began on a return of the Jeffries family. Producer Steven Zanoski believed a return for the family honoured Shortland Street fans, "When we began to look at who could return for the birthday week we debated long and hard on who would work. But when we found out that the Jeffries family were available we instantly knew we had it." That May it was announced that Yvonne would be returning to the show for a guest appearance alongside the remaining members of the Jeffries family to commemorate Shortland Street's 20th anniversary.

With the return of the Jeffries family on-screen once Saville had reprised her role of Libby in 2025, informal messages were exchanged with Quigan to garner interest in a return to the character of Yvonne - to which she was eager. When formally offered, she happily accepted with Saville recalling, "There wasn’t a dry eye in the house. It was truly like going back home because we’ve always got on really well."

== Storylines ==
Yvonne and her husband Ian (Jeffrey Thomas) first visited their eldest daughter, Maia Jeffries (Anna Jullienne), in November 2004, during which Yvonne expressed concern about Ian's deteriorating health. He was subsequently diagnosed with motor neuron disease. Yvonne returned the following year to visit Maia and, seeking greater stability for the family amid Ian's ongoing illness, applied for a position as receptionist at Shortland Street Hospital. Despite struggling with technology, hospital CEO Andrew Solomon (Paolo Rotondo) recognised her empathetic nature and offered her the job. Yvonne quickly adapted to the role and became an integral member of the hospital staff.

Yvonne's family life was soon complicated by the reappearance of the son she and Ian had given up for adoption at birth, Hamish Flynn (Phil Brown). She also struggled to come to terms with Maia's sexuality, creating tension between mother and daughter. Yvonne and Ian's marriage deteriorated, particularly after she announced her intention never to return to their farm, and began suspecting Ian of having an affair. The couple eventually reconciled, but their reunion was short-lived as Ian subsequently died by suicide. Yvonne was later devastated to discover that Hamish was not their biological son, but a conman who had deceived the family. She eventually made contact with her biological son and became acquainted with his children.

Following Ian's death, Yvonne pursued a number of romantic relationships, including a brief relationship with Sammy Diamond (Andy Anderson). She also endured considerable personal loss when several of her friends became victims of the serial killer known as The Ferndale Strangler.

In 2008, Yvonne began a relationship with Fraser McKenzie (Peter Daube), but became caught up in his troubled marriage to Deborah (Susan Curnow), who was suffering from Alzheimer's disease. Yvonne was injured by Deborah and, following surgery, developed cancer as a result of a faulty skin graft. Although the cancer was successfully removed, her relationship with Fraser ended when she discovered he was planning to murder Deborah.

In 2009, Yvonne was horrified to discover Maia's involvement in a murder but supported her through the psychological breakdown she subsequently suffered. Yvonne later became involved in a bank robbery, where she met Ben Goodall (Shaun Edwards-Brown). Introducing Ben to her daughter Tania (Faye Smythe), Yvonne soon realised she herself was in love with Ben, pursuing a controversial romance that destroyed her and Tania's relationship. The two eventually reconciled after Yvonne nearly died from meningitis. However, Ben later died from a brain haemorrhage.

In 2011, Yvonne's close friend Shobna (Leela Patel) returned to Ferndale and offered her a new job. In February, Yvonne departed the series alongside Maia and her grandson Peter (Liam Sharma), relocating to Sydney. The trio returned in May 2012 while travelling to a Jeffries family reunion held to celebrate Yvonne's birthday. Their visit was extended when Libby's (Fleur Saville) husband, Gerald Tippett (Harry McNaughton), suffered heart failure.

== Character development ==
=== Relationship with Ben Goodall ===
In 2009, Shaun Edwards-Brown was cast as the role of Ben Goodall, a paramedic Yvonne meets whilst caught in a bank robbery. The two characters both survived the ordeal and Yvonne set Ben up with her youngest daughter Tania. When Yvonne organised a book group, Ben attended and Yvonne was touched by a short story he wrote to deal with the bank robbery. Ben soon dumped Tania and started to realise he was in fact, in love with Yvonne. Alison Quigan was shocked by the storyline and stated; "I thought she still hadn’t got over her relationship with Fraser McKenzie and was just biding her time with her family. I was surprised, I thought I was going to be spared this kind of storyline!" Though the feelings were mutual, Yvonne put Tania before her, Quigan explained the motive saying; "She knows Tania is vulnerable and has had boyfriends who have not treated her well." Yvonne also believed Ben had developed an attachment during the heist; "There are so many reasons why Ben and Yvonne could never be together, and she knows that. For starters, she would hate to hurt her daughter. She also believes that Ben is confused by the closeness that they developed during their bank robbery ordeal."

Faye Smythe (Tania Jeffries) believed if the two started a relationship, Tania would be disgusted but eventually deal with it, stating "They are a pretty tight-knit family and I think any girl can only go so long without her mum." Yvonne and Ben did eventually get together to much disgust in December 2009. Quigan believed the two were truly in love saying "I can see this lasting and I think that’s why they’ve fought so hard to make it happen." As the relationship progressed, the age gap became much more clear with Quigan explaining "Yvonne is extremely happy with Ben, and pleased that things are going so well between the two of them. So when she’s mistaken for his mum, it really takes her by surprise."Quigan thought the storyline helped her personally and enjoyed the chemistry between her and Edwards-Brown, stating; "It’s hard to deny your own personal insecurities as you get older. This storyline confronted me with the way my own body has aged, especially when I looked at myself alongside someone so much younger. I worried that it would look silly, but once we were working together, I realised that it’s just two people who really get each other. Shaun is a very generous actor, who makes it really easy. He’s a delight to work with. Ben proposed to Yvonne but she declined, favouring a party but during the party, Ben was knocked out by hooligans at a supermarket and developed a brain hemorrhage. Ben fell into a coma and never awoke, his life support was turned off in June 2010 and his organs donated.

== Reception ==
Despite the characters constant drama, she quickly became a fan favourite. Writer Victor Rodger found Yvonne a particularly pleasant character to write for, stating; "I like writing for Yvonne very much, she sort of reminds me of my mum." The characters matriarchal archetype, saw comparisons to past characters; Marj Neilson, Barb Heywood and Moira Crombie. Quigan found the reaction to Yvonne's relationship with Ben interesting, stating; "I was quite surprised people had such strong opinions about it. Some were absolutely horrified but others are thrilled that she actually gets a young man. I have enjoyed Yvonne being at the centre of something and she’s had a lot of tears so it’s quite nice that she gets a bit of love." The return of Yvonne in 2012 was highly praised.
