= Shortland Street 20th anniversary =

- Shortland Street episodes
- Episode nos.: Series 21; Episodes 4992–4998
- Directed by: Wayne Tourelle
- Written by: Kim Harrop
- Editing by: Anna Beneakter
- Original air date: 21 May 2012 – 25 May 2012

Shortland Street's 20th anniversary is a series of episodes that aired to commemorate the 20th year of the New Zealand soap opera Shortland Street from 21 to 25 May 2012. The episodes were built around a 90-minute episode that aired on the 21st and climaxed in a helicopter crash. Billed as Shortland Street's biggest ever episode, the anniversary was highly praised by reviewers and received record ratings. Other storylines included Gerald Tippett's heart surgery and Callum McKay's departure.

Several characters returned to commemorate the occasion, with the Jeffries family; Yvonne (Alison Quigan), Maia (Anna Jullienne), Libby (Fleur Saville), Tania (Faye Smythe), Gerald (Harry McNaughton) and Jay (Liam Farmer), returning alongside the show's original receptionist – Marj Brasch (Elizabeth McRae). Sophie McKay (Kimberley Crossman) also returned in a single scene, alongside several other minor character returnees.

== Casting ==
At least 10 past characters were confirmed to return for the anniversary, some in major roles whilst others in cameos. The return of several previous characters depended on the availability of the actors. Despite the line; "You're not in Guatemala now Dr. Ropata" being one of the show's most iconic moments, Temuera Morrison (Hone Ropata) was confirmed not to be returning for the special. Karl Burnett, who portrayed longest running original character - Nick Harrison confirmed he was not asked to return via his Facebook status. During an interview with Woman's Day in April 2012, Anna Jullienne confirmed her character Maia Jeffries would be returning to the show to meet with unannounced members of the Jeffries family.

The following week it was confirmed that the other surviving members of the Jeffries family – Yvonne, Libby, Tania and Jay would be returning alongside Libby's husband Gerald Tippett throughout May. Fleur Saville (Libby Jeffries) said returning to the show was; "like returning home! It was fantastic to see all my friends in the crew and cast and hear what everyone has been up to since I left 2 years ago." Anna Jullienne (Maia Jeffries) was happy to return for the momentous occasion, stating; "It's been great to be part of the 20th celebrations. Shortland Street was a huge part of my life for years and I'm happy to celebrate its great achievements." Producer – Steven Zanoski described his decision to bring the Jeffries back as; "When we began to look at who could return for the birthday week we debated long and hard on who would work. But when we found out that the Jeffries family were available we instantly knew we had it."

On 7 May it was confirmed series original - Elizabeth McRae, would be returning as the character of Marj Brasch, the original receptionist. Zanoski explained Marj's return, stating; "With the return of Yvonne to the reception desk it was only a matter of course to have Marj back." Paul Gittins (Michael McKenna) jokingly stated that he was not asked to reprise his role as his character had been dead for 13 years. The Emergency Department location was notably missing a doctor and so writers decided to introduce a character in the 20th anniversary episodes to fulfil this. This led to the creation of Josh Gallagher, who was described as; "an adrenalin junkie who loves the rush of ED and the precision and skill involved in surgical work. He's used to partying all night before sneaking in to start his shift" was created for this position Chris Tempest was cast in the role. The character of Lionel Skeggins was considered to be brought back, with Zanoski commenting; "There was talk of bringing back Lionel in a brief cameo appearance for the 20th Anniversary, just for all the fans who still believe that Lionel didn't die. I almost wish we had done it." Several other less notable characters returned including Estevez Gillespie as Bailey Finch after an absence of 4 months, Henry Beasley as Tom Stanton after 4 months and Roy Ward as Nigel Tippett after 3 years. Kimberley Crossman also made a brief one scene reappearance as Sophie McKay as part of Callum's departing scenes.

== Production ==
In 2011 a special episode was announced of the show to air on the 20th anniversary. In March 2012 it was announced that the episode would be 90 minutes long and would likely focus on several returned characters. Producer - Steven Zanoski, was thrilled by the momentous episode saying; "It's been hugely exciting over the last couple of weeks as we see faces from the past come back through the studios, some for cameo appearances, others as pivotal parts of the storylines that are set to come." Zanoski also announced that there would be an extreme stunt taking place in the episode, saying; "We are also gearing up to film one of the biggest stunt sequences we have ever done. We have all sorts of amazing hardware being delivered to our art sheds and everything is being kept top secret. Viewers will have a lot to look forward to over the next couple of months."

The episode's storyline was to feature a staff party where the doctors and nurses would don the original outfits worn in 1992. Actress Rachel Blampied (Bree Hamilton) was glad to be part of the 20th anniversary shoot, calling it "nostalgic". Her onscreen sister, Beth Allen (Brooke Freeman), agreed stating; "With everything going on with the birthday, it's a really exciting time to be part of the show." The feature-length episode was also announced to take place on 21 May as part of the Winter season. Zanoski described the episodes as "spectacular". After numerous mentions of a helipad on the hospital roof as the anniversary drew near, it soon was soon announced that the episodes would climax in a helicopter crash. The helicopter wreckage was sourced from a helicopter that crashed in Auckland's Viaduct Harbour while erecting a Christmas tree in November 2011, with the sound effect of the crash coming from TVNZ, who had inadvertently caught the helicopter crash on camera. The scene took 11 hours to film. Numerous special effects were used and cast and crew speculated it would likely be the shows biggest stunt.

The filming took night shoots and double shifts alongside stunt and technical work. Because of this Zanoski ensured the episode would be gripping and the show's "biggest ever episode". A storyline was devised where one of the show's primary characters would undergo a murder charge after killing off another character. Great deal of attention was put into how the character would be killed off and the concept of stabbing was decided upon. Medical researchers were also used heavily for the episodes, with crushing, drug addiction scars and heart surgery all being featured.

== Promotion ==
In April it was announced past Shortland Street actress, Kimberley Crossman (Sophie McKay) would be hosting an hour special titled; 'Naughty Shorty', that would show bloopers and mistakes from the show's first 20 years. Crossman enjoyed hosting the special, stating; "It's a great show and it was great to be able to host it and be in some of the bloopers as well. You can't really hide who you are when you make a mistake. You reveal so much of yourself and it'so so funny." Crossman played the host, stating; "I basically play the role of that guy from America's Funniest Home Videos. All the hard work is done, and I get the pleasure of throwing to the hilarious moments." and enjoyed the experience of returning to set; "It was cool to be back, see everyone and be part of something that people will be watching in years to come." An official Shortland Street magazine was released to commemorate the occasion, the magazine featured interviews with cast alongside memorable storylines and characters from the soap's first 20 years. On 21 May 2012, a real-life situation occurred where a helicopter in Christchurch crashed into a lake. Although the soap was filmed months in advance, executives considered rescheduling the feature-length episode but it was decided against in favour of continuity.

== Reception ==
Of the week starting 17 May 2012, the Shortland Street 20th anniversary was named as one of the top five picks of the week. The episode received an audience of 756,980 people, thus screening to 50% of audiences aged 25–54. Lydia Jenkin of The New Zealand Herald, highly enjoyed the feature-length episode, praising the characters of Yvonne and Libby Jeffries, the helicopter crash and the Hayley storyline. Eric Thompson of The Dominion Post also praised the episode and stated the show continued; "to be a powerhouse of Kiwi television." MSN New Zealand highlighted the scene where past character's name tags were viewed, calling it; "a nice touch".
