= Brooke Freeman =

- Shortland Street character
- Portrayed by: Beth Allen
- Duration: 2008–2014, 2023, 2025
- First appearance: 14 July 2008
- Last appearance: 19 March 2025
- Introduced by: Jason Daniel (2008); Oliver Driver (2023 & 2025)
In-universe information
- Other names: Brooke Marsden; Brooke Freeman
- Occupation: Doctor; CEO of St. Catherines Hospital
- Father: Grant Marsden
- Mother: Annette Freeman
- Half-sisters: Bree Hamilton
- Husband: Boyd Rolleston (2013-2015)

Brooke Freeman (also Marsden and Rolleston) is a fictional character from the New Zealand soap opera Shortland Street, played by Beth Allen. Brooke debuted on-screen during the episode airing on 14 July 2008. The role was written with Allen in mind to play her. Brooke arrived as a locum GP but later advanced in her career. She is played as a manipulative female, who uses her sexuality to advance in her career. She is also characterised by her complex backstory which has resulted in her "messed up" persona. As a stylish female, Allen is required to spend longer in the dressing room with make-up artists. Brooke's style has been attributed to Katharine Hepburn, though she wears dark colours to convey her personality.

Brooke has been described as "doctor-hunting" for her many relationships with colleagues. Two of her notable relationships include a failed romance with Ethan Pierce (Owen Black) - which almost led her to suicide. The other with TK Samuels (Benjamin Mitchell), who exposed her vulnerable side. With this stylist Nicola Newman began dressing Brooke is lighter colours to convey the change. Other storylines include coping with her alcoholic mother and making a serious medical error. Brooke has been positively received by critics, favouring her deceitful nature and calling her the serial's "token bitch". Allen has been nominated for a "New Idea People's Choice Award" at the 2010 Qantas Television Awards.

== Development ==
=== Characterisation ===
Brooke was created with actress Beth Allen in mind to play her. When she auditioned for the role, Allen did not anticipate that Brooke would be such a "vixen". She had always aspired to work on Shortland Street and also found Brooke's complexity an appealing factor upon taking the role. Career wise, Brooke likes to create the impression that she is a competent, confident and ambitious woman. TVNZ describe her as "a study in fire and ice." As she is ambitious, she finds general practice as a chore rather than her job. She is also described as often struggling to maintain her "professional façade" through general work. Brooke's persona has been characterised through her flirty, two-faced nature and she often manipulates her way through situations. Allen said Brooke uses her sexuality to get what she wants. Allen tried to understand Brooke because of her complex backstory, but admitted that when she watched her on-screen Brooke comes across as not a very nice person. Allen explained that Brooke is "quite messed up" because of stuff in her background that she has running away from. She also said Brooke get into "wrong situations or has friends who don't serve what she really wants." Allen has applauded Brooke for having more "depth" to her than previous roles she has played. She added "She has enough depth that she does have room to move as a character."

"Cracks in Brooke's exterior start to show. If things aren't going her way, or people start to doubt her, she struggles to maintain her composure. Brooke likes to keep her work and private life very separate. It's only natural though, everyone has their little secrets."

— Allen on Brooke.

Brooke is stylised as a fashionable female. Her early style was based on Katharine Hepburn's classy image. She has often been played with full make up and straight hair. Allen revealed it took more than one hour each day for the make up department to create Brooke's look. Due to Allen's thick-curly hair being hard to maintain, she had to have chemical treatment to straighten it. This was also used to keep continuity with Brooke's appearance. Described as "ultra-fashion-conscious", Brooke has usually dressed in tight silky blouses, high-waisted skirts and high heels. The skirts have made full movement for Allen difficult. A "classic Brooke look" is a black fitted dress, worn with a belt and gold jewellery and heels. Brooke's colour scheme was made up of very dark tones such as black, grey and gold. The serial's stylist Nicola Newman revealed that when Brooke showed her "vulnerable side", she implemented lighter colours to convey the change.

=== Storyline development ===
When Brooke first arrives she tried to romance Chris Warner (Michael Galvin). Allen thought it was "hilarious" that she got to chase "doctor love" around. One of Brooke's first relationships was with Ethan Pierce (Owen Black). Black told The Sunday Star-Times that he had a good working relationship with Allen, which helped them successfully perform many "big pashing scenes." When Black was written out of the serial, his character Ethan was forced to run away. Brooke pleaded to run away with him, but Ethan prevented her from leaving with him. Black said that Brooke was always "the one" for Ethan. He concluded that Ethan just wanted to protect her as "he sees the wolf closing in on him and he was just getting out." After Ethan was murdered, Brooke found out she did not know his true self. Brooke was distraught and purposely walked into a road filled with busy traffic. Allen said she sympathised with the way Brooke felt because the situation is easy to relate to. She added that because Brooke trusted Ethan and he let her down, she is left "questioning her whole view on the world." Brooke makes an enemy in Ethan's girlfriend Alice Piper (Toni Potter) and they later have a cat fight. The scenes were described as "impromptu and embarrassing for both girls." Allen and Potter had fun filming the scenes which involved much hair-pulling and slapping. Brooke later starts a relationship with TK Samuels (Benjamin Mitchell). Brooke played her vulnerable side to appeal to TK's morality. Allen revealed that Brooke does not "stay all that grounded about the relationship" and that she became uncertain about her position as his girlfriend. She added that there was an element of "craziness" to the storyline. Brooke "proved too needy" for TK, so he ended their romance.

In one storyline Brooke becomes too focused on running the Primary Care Clinic, that she put a patient's life elsewhere at risk. Allen said Brooke's "standard of care and precision has slipped." The scenes played out when she incorrectly prescribed Barry Knox (Richard Green) with the wrong drugs, he developed serotonin syndrome. Sarah Potts (Amanda Billing) confronted Brooke over her negligence and she realised she needed to cover her tracks. Allen explained that Brooke was "surprised and embarrassed" to realise she made a medical error. Brooke cared about the patient, but she cared for her career more so. Adding that Brooke knew she had to remain quiet and carry out "damage control". However Barry was not satisfied with her care and acted unpredictable. Brooke "comprehends the magnitude of her error" upon seeing his behaviour and told him the truth. Allen is an ambassador for a gynaecological cancer charity. She convinced a producer to explore the disease through her character. The storyline is played out when Brooke discovers she has ovarian cysts. Allen said she liked to think it was "making a difference" because it was an illness "that no-one talks about." Brooke was later forced to cope with the arrival of her alcoholic mother Annette, with Louise Wallace being cast in the role. Producers later introduced Winston Youn (Min Kim) as her "devoted and meticulous" research assistant. When Kim auditioned for the role, producers were "blown away by his portrayal of the admiration the character felt towards Brooke." In October, Brooke and polar opposite Vinnie Kruse (Pua Magasiva) develop a relationship. It was announced in November 2011 that a new addition to Brooke's family would be arriving. In December, actress Rachel Blampied arrived to the soap as Brooke's illegitimate half sister, Bree. Blampied enjoyed acting alongside Allen and Magasiva stating; "I've had some great scenes with Beth and Pua, which have been enormous fun as they're such generous actors and are heaps of fun to hang out with!"

In 2023, Allen reprised the role and Brooke makes a cameo appearance working at St Catherines hospital.

== Storylines ==
Brooke arrives at Shortland Street as a locum GP and instantly attracts a male attention from Kip Denton (Will Hall) and Chris. Ethan arrives to work at the hospital as a surgeon and they start an affair. Tania Jeffries (Faye Smythe) and Tracey Morrison (Sarah Thomson) take a disliking to Brooke as they think she is playing mind games with Kip and Chris. Brooke dates Chris to help Ethan gain a promotion. Their relationship soon ends. The Ferndale newspaper publish an article about Brooke, revealing that her father, Grant scammed millions of dollars from people. Brooke tells a lie to Chris, in order land Harry in trouble. TK suspects that Brooke is not a qualified doctor, as he disapproves of her work ethic. This leads to animosity between the pair. Brooke becomes tired of Shortland Street. When Ethan announces his departure, she pleads to move with him. However, Ethan is shot dead.

Brooke is the main suspect in his killing. Brooke is then charged, until nurse Maia Jeffries (Anna Jullienne) is discovered to be the killer. Brooke starts dating Kieran Mitchell (Adam Rickitt). Kieran starts a false clinic up to scam Brooke's father (Alan Lovell) out of thousands, whilst Brooke is promoted to HOD, which in turn annoys TK. Brooke has TK moved to ED and begins taking more shifts at her own plastic surgery clinic. Though the clinic is forced to close when business does not come in. After ending her relationship with Kieran, she starts a relationship with hospital CEO Callum McKay (Peter Mochrie). She uses him to help herself advance in her career. Callum's wife Justine Jones (Lucy Wigmore) returns and he is unable to choose between the two. Justine realises the attraction between them and allows Callum to move on. Brooke is shot by hitman Don Lennox (Chris Easley), after he mistakes her for Justine and she survives the attack. Brooke gives romantic advice to Callums daughter Sophie McKay (Kimberley Crossman) about Kieran, this has a negative effect on her own relationship.

Brooke faces hardship when Callum ends their relationship after he realises her manipulative ways. Hospital auditor, Rachel McKenna (Angela Bloomfield) then fires her. On her return Brooke clashes with ED doctor Maxwell Avia (Robbie Magasiva) which leads to a potential romance. The romance never gets off the ground and he makes her homeless from their shared apartment. Brooke is surprised when TK acts as her support network, Brooke falls in love with TK. She sets out to destroy his marriage to Sarah. She manages to cause problems that lead them to separate. Though TK initially fends off Brooke's romantic advances - he sleeps with Brooke when he realises Sarah has moved on. He later gives her a chance and she attempts to make him love her. She gives food to homeless people, as she thinks good deeds will make her look good. Brooke realises TK still loves Sarah so she attempts to fall pregnant by him. She makes holes in condoms - but it backfires when Loren Fitzpatrick (Sophia Johnson), becomes pregnant instead. When Brooke becomes too needy, TK breaks up with her.

She then strikes up a friendship with Gerald Tippett (Harry McNaughton). Brooke's alcoholic mother Annette Freeman arrives in Ferndale - which upsets Brooke. Brooke is shocked when she has a cancer scare and her mother runs away out of fear. Brooke later starts dating Isaac Worthington (Matt Minto) and the two begin to plot against others. Brooke helps Isaac get Luke Durville (Gerald Urquhart) fired and in return Isaac helps Brooke steal research from Lars Hammett (Sean O'Connor), who has sex with Brooke and then dies. Brooke later dumps Isaac and she starts to work in research, achieving recognition and respect in her field.

Winston becomes her assistant, but she is left disturbed by his stalker tendencies. He helps her bond with her mother and the two soon become good friends. Brooke is scared by the presence of Larz's wife Nadia Hammett (Jessi Williams). Nadia soon learns the secret and is found dead. Brooke fears Winston killed her but after starting a relationship with old flame Alex Murphy (Bede Skinner) and purposely mowing down Winston in her car, she learns Winston was only trying to protect Brooke and is innocent. In December 2011, Brooke meets her half-sister Bree Hamilton. Refusing to get to know her, Bree continued to try to get to know Brooke.

Brooke's mother Annette Freeman returns, Bree assaults her mother after she told her that she was an unwanted mistake. Bree threw Annette down the stairs and crushed her foot in the door, all without Brooke knowing. Brooke kicks Annette out for accusing her of being insane. Anonymous to Bree taking off to Chicago with her name and passport, Brooke meets Bree's boyfriend and he is confused of the real Brooke. When Brooke tells Bree of the news she has learnt, Bree yells at Brooke telling her that her name is not Bree, but Brooke. Brooke tries to call for help, but Bree throws her phone under a couch. As Brooke bends over to get the phone, Bree attacks her and hits her over the head with an ornament. Brooke wakes up the next day in a small space (presumed to be a wardrobe), fearing for her life. Later on she is saved by Vinnie and Sarah, who successfully get information out of Bree, who was still referring to herself as 'Brooke'. Once in the hospital, Brooke learns more about Bree's motives and then makes the painful choice to refer her sister to a psychiatric unit. She had visited Bree but it was cut short and she was told to keep away from her, causing Brooke to feel guilty that she is unable to support her one and only sibling.

Brooke later marries wealthy doctor Boyd Rolleston in an attempt to free him of ties to his horrific family. At first Brooke only considered Boyd because of his money and manipulated him into taking her to his family estate, but now has formed a somewhat normal relationship with him. Boyd was later stripped of all his money, yet Brooke stood by him. Maybe after all this time Brooke has finally changed and found 'the one'.

Later, Brooke was discovered to have advanced renal failure and was needed a donor for a kidney transplant. She required the aid of a dialysis machine three times a week. However, Brooke knew that Boyd's career was much more important than her being his sick wife. Brooke split up with Boyd and decided to end the contract possibly because she did not want Boyd to suffer as she is dying. Brooke needs a kidney transplant and her sister, Bree comes back to Shortland Street as she may be the only person to donate the kidney to her. When Bree gets scared about having an operation she gets advice from Josh Gallagher.

Josh then murders Dayna Jenkins' injured mother to harvest a kidney for Brooke. On the last episode of 2013, Brooke has a successful operation. Brooke was devastated when Boyd cheated on her with Ava Erickson. The two decided to break up.

After the death of her close friend Sarah Potts in August 2014, Brooke worked on a project in her honour, but in September, Brooke decided that she was better off leaving Shortland Street after all and she leaves for a new opportunity in Washington, DC.

In 2023, Brooke appeared again as the CEO of St Catherine's hospital, a private clinic in Ferndale. Brooke reunites with Chris who asks her to help fund the reopening of Shortland Street, but she declines, showing little love for her former workplace. When Shortland Street does eventually get enough funding to return, the staff that relocated to St Catherine's get their Shortland Street jobs back, and Brooke wishes Chris luck, before parting once more.

== Reception ==
For her portrayal, Allen was nominated in category of "New Idea People's Choice Award" at the 2010 Qantas Television Awards, but did not win. Sarah Lang of The New Zealand Herald said Brooke was the serial's "latest vixen" who had been putting her "pins to good use". She branded her a "doctor-hunting, enigmatic, eye-catching locum" because she mind games with Chris and Kip. She concluded by describing her as "an intriguing mass of contradictions, is assertive yet vulnerable, kind-hearted yet manipulative, gregarious yet aloof - so while we haven't much warmed to her, we don't hate her yet either." Lang's Herald colleague Zoe Walker said Brooke is Shortland Street's "token bitch" with a liking for "tailored jackets, pencil skirts and plunging necklines." Whilst Nicola Russel of the Sunday News similarly branded Brooke as the serial's "resident bitch." The Sunday Star-Times said "Brooke's angelic looks hide a ruthless personality she won't hesitate to lie her way out of sticky situations." They also said "everywhere she goes, men follow, like wafts of cheap perfume." They ultimately rated her a seven out of ten in their "Bad girl" feature. Many of Allen's co stars listed Brooke as the soap's best villain, noting the character's ability to manipulate whilst also empathising with the audience.
