= Maia Jeffries =

- Shortland Street character
- Portrayed by: Anna Jullienne
- Duration: 2004–2012
- First appearance: Episode 3002; 25 June 2004
- Last appearance: 28 May 2012
- Introduced by: Harriet Crampton (2004); Steven Zanoski (2012)
In-universe information
- Occupation: Charge Nurse
- Father: Ian Jeffries
- Mother: Yvonne Jeffries
- Brothers: Hamish Flynn
- Sisters: Libby Jeffries; Tania Jeffries
- Civil partner: Jessica "Jay" Copeland (2006–2007)
- Sons: Jay "JJ" Jeffries
- Grandmothers: Phyllis Gregory
- Aunts: Eileen Horrocks; Janice Gregory
- Nephews: Peter Flynn
- Nieces: Amber Flynn
- First cousins: Richard Horrocks; Simon Horrocks; Anna Horrocks

Maia Anne Jeffries is a fictional character on the New Zealand soap opera Shortland Street. She was portrayed by Anna Jullienne from mid-2004 to early-2011, with the character starring in numerous high-profile storylines alongside her on screen family. The character returned as part of the show's 20th anniversary in May 2012.

Arriving in mid-2004 as the travel partner of Victor's (Calvin Tuteao) daughter Jay Copeland (Jaime Passier-Armstrong), it was soon revealed the two were really lesbian lovers. Quickly getting a job at Shortland Street Hospital as a nurse, it was not long before Maia's family arrived on the show, establishing a family unit. Maia's relationship with Jay proved to be rocky and the two eventually married in a civil union on Valentine's Day 2006, only to separate and Maia to become widowed just over a year later. Maia participated in a major storyline in 2007 that saw her become pregnant with the help of her sister Tania's (Faye Smythe) husband, Mark (Tim Foley). The situation proved not to be the first time the family exploded however, in 2009 Maia admitted to having murdered Ethan Pierce (Owen Black) and subsequently spent time in a mental health facility. Maia found love with Nicole Miller (Sally Martin) in 2010, only to cheat on her and leave the show in early 2011.

Maia had a mixed reception, while her storylines were praised by fans. Anna Jullienne was also praised for her portrayal of Maia and won the Air New Zealand Screen Award for "Best Supporting Actress" in 2007.

== Creation and casting ==
In 2004 the family of established character, Victor Kahu (Calvin Tuteao) was expanded and his daughter, Jay Copeland (Jaime Passier-Armstrong) was introduced. Arriving alongside the 3-month recurring character, was Jay's secret girlfriend, Maia Jeffries. Anna Jullienne auditioned for the role and was intrigued by the reactions other actors had to her sexuality, "The thing with Shortland Street is the public start to think you are your character. Maybe some people are worried about that, they wouldn't want other people to think they're a lesbian. I know some other women who went for it and their male partners were a bit, kind of, funny about it. I don't have too many qualms about people thinking possibly that I am." At age 21, Jullienne won the role whilst she was halfway through a bachelor of arts. Shortly into Maia's stint, the Jeffries' family was introduced and expanded. Despite undergoing a storyline where she murdered a man, in 2009 Jullienne assured viewers that Maia would continue on the show and would not be getting written off in the foreseeable future.

By 2010 most of the family had disbanded and Alison Quigan (Yvonne Jeffries) believed they had, "run out of steam" With Quigan and Jullienne being the sole remaining members of the Jeffries', both decided to quit, with Jullienne deciding to spend more time with her recent husband. Maia made her final appearance on 9 February 2011. The following year producers discovered that all the actors of the Jeffries' family were available to film in early-2012 and the decision was made to reintroduce the family as celebration of the show's 20th anniversary. Jullienne revealed the return during an interview with Woman's Day in April. Television New Zealand confirmed that all the surviving members of the family would return on screen in May 2012. Jullienne stated, "It's been great to be part of the 20th celebrations, Shortland Street was a huge part of my life for years and I'm happy to celebrate its great achievements." Maia appeared for two weeks and made her final appearance on 28 May 2012.

== Storylines ==
Maia arrived in Ferndale in with travel companion Jay Copeland (Jaime Passier-Armstrong) and she gets a job at Shortland Street Hospital. It soon became clear the two were more than friends and were really lesbian lovers. The two moved into El Rancho with Li Mei Chen (Li Ming Hu), Jesse George (Hannah Tolich), Nelson Copeland (Quinton Hita) and Vinnie Kruse (Pua Magasiva). Maia struggled to deal with the realization her father Ian Jeffries (Jeffrey Thomas) was deathly ill and he, alongside Maia's mother Yvonne (Alison Quigan) moved to Ferndale to be closer to Maia.

Maia's youngest sister Tania Jeffries (Faye Smythe) arrived as a nurse at the hospital and Maia was shocked to learn she had a brother, Hamish Flynn (Phil Brown) who arrived to work for the hospital. However he later turned out to be a conman. Maia and Jay broke up, with Maia starting to date a woman named Fee. When Jay returned to Shortland Street, Maia announced her love and the two got engaged. They were wed by civil union, with sister Libby (Fleur Saville) boycotting the ceremony and Yvonne considering avoiding it. Ian commits suicide a few days later and Jay later cheats on her. The two reconcile but Maia's desperation to have a child drove a wedge between the two and they separated.

Maia's desperation to be a mother, led her to plead with Tania's husband Mark Weston (Tim Foley) to donate sperm, Tania at first allowed him but after the attempt failed, refused a second attempt. However Mark went behind Tania's back and impregnated Maia. The secret was so overwhelming, Mark was driven to cheat on Tania. Maia and Jay reconciled but after Jay told Yvonne about Mark, Maia decided she could never trust her and the two parted forever, only for Jay to be murdered by the Ferndale Strangler. Tania's marriage broke up following the reveal of the truth and she found herself despising Maia, only forgiving her when she gave birth to Maia's baby Jay "JJ" Jeffries (Jack and Tom Boyle) in the back of her car. Maia moves to Thames for a break.

Maia shows hesitance to return to Ferndale after having the perfect life in Thames but after her friend kidnaps her baby JJ, Maia decides to move back. The Jeffries start to notice Maia showing no affection towards JJ and Maia eventually reveals JJ has been diagnosed with the same illness Ian has, with some help Maia comes to love her son. Maia develops a crush on both Brooke Freeman (Beth Allen) and good friend, Alice Piper (Toni Potter). When Alice's boyfriend Ethan (Owen Black) discovers Maia's secret, he publicly humiliates her and gets her suspended from work. Maia later finds out he is responsible for Yvonne getting bone cancer. In December Ethan is shot three times by an unseen gunman and dies.

Maia confesses to Alice that she went to Ethan's house and took the gun from Alice while she slept and shot Ethan three times. Refusing to admit to the police, Maia becomes very paranoid and accuses a patient's father of being a police informant. Maia goes to Opononi for a break and returns cheerful, with no knowledge of the murder but eventually has a breakdown once again which results in her being sectioned, under the Mental Health Act, by her sister Tania. While being treated as an in-patient, Maia began hallucinating and seeing and conversing with Ethan Pierce's ghost. Maia soon confesses to the murder but is acquitted due to a mental breakdown. Maia later made friends with bisexual Nicole Miller (Sally Martin).

Maia and Nicole start to date following Nicole's hesitation after learning Maia is a killer. However their contrasting personalities cause Nicole to flee Ferndale. Maia and Gerald Tippett (Harry McNaughton) go to Tauranga to see Nicole and she admits her love, returning to Ferndale. The two start to socialize with new doctor Jennifer Mason (Sara Wiseman) and Maia's finds herself smitten.

Jennifer and Maia start an affair and Maia breaks up with Nicole in hope of dating Jennifer, only for Jennifer to leave the country. Attempting to reconcile, Maia realizes it is over and decides to take JJ to Sydney to live with Yvonne. She, Yvonne and JJ leave.

Maia returns to Shortland Street with Yvonne and JJ for Yvonne's birthday.

== Reception ==
Maia received an overall mixed reception, with her and Jay winning runner up for "Most Boring Couple" in the Throng Shortland Street Fan Awards 2006. However their civil union won runner up for "Most Romantic Moment" and the couple also won runner up for "Funniest Moment", following scenes where they suspected Eti was on drugs. Maia's major storyline throughout 2007, her baby with Mark, was a popular storyline, winning runner up for "Favourite Storyline" in the 2007 awards. In the 2008 awards, fans notably wished for Maia and Alice to get together. In 2012, the character was named as one of the standout characters of the show's first 20 years. The characters civil union and the storyline that saw Jay cheat on Maia with a man was voted by fans as two of the show's most iconic moments. Television New Zealand claimed in 2012 that 9 out of 10 New Zealander's would identify the name of "Maia Jeffries" with Shortland Street.

Anna Julliene won the "Air New Zealand Screen Award" for best supporting actress for her portrayal of Maia Jeffries throughout 2007. Over half a million viewers watched Maia and Jay's civil union.
