= Libby Jeffries =

- Shortland Street character
- Portrayed by: Fleur Saville
- Duration: 2006–2010, 2012, 2025–
- First appearance: 2 February 2006
- Introduced by: Jason Daniel (2006); Steven Zanoski (2010, 2012); Oliver Driver (2025)
In-universe information
- Occupation: Personal assistant
- Father: Ian Jeffries
- Mother: Yvonne Jeffries
- Brothers: Hamish Flynn
- Sisters: Maia Jeffries; Tania Jeffries
- Husband: Gerald Tippett (2010–)
- Grandmothers: Phyllis Gregory
- Aunts: Eileen Horrocks; Janice Gregory
- Nephews: Peter Flynn; Jay "JJ" Jeffries
- Nieces: Amber Flynn
- First cousins: Richard Horrocks; Simon Horrocks; Anna Horrocks

Olivia "Libby" Tippett (previously Jeffries) is a fictional character on the New Zealand soap opera Shortland Street who was portrayed by Fleur Saville initially from early-2006 to mid-2010. She returned in a guest appearance during the shows 20th anniversary in 2012, and again as a regular from December 2025.

Primarily a comedic character, Libby arrived as the final installment to the Jeffries family unit, headed by Yvonne (Alison Quigan) and Ian Jeffries (Jeffrey Thomas). She worked at the hospital as personal assistant to the chief executive officer and her storylines often focused on her determination to find the perfect husband which often ended in disastrous consequences. Several instances included: nearly marrying George Barrington (Sean Lynch) who was a closet gay, Justin Salt (Heath Jones) who attempted to rape her, Kieran Mitchell (Adam Rickett) who was a criminal, Chris Warner (Michael Galvin) who left her for another women, Oliver Ritchie (Mark Warren) who kidnapped her and Isaac Worthington (Matt Minto) who was a serial womanizer. Libby ended up finding the perfect husband in best friend, Gerald Tippett (Harry McNaughton), and the two departed the show together in 2010.

Known for her comedic storylines and fashion sense, the character was highly praised throughout her run, winning "Best New Character" in the 2006 fan awards. She went on to place runner up in "Favourite Female Character" every year from 2006 to 2009.

== Creation and casting ==
Fleur Saville joined Shortland Street in early 2006 as the role of Libby, the middle child in the Jeffries family. The role was originally a guest role, however producers loved the character so much, she was signed to a core cast role. Producer Jason Daniel wanted Libby to embody the role of the Sex and the City characters, without the sex. In 2010, though Saville wasn't sick of the role, she wished to portray more characters and quit. 3 months later, Saville was offered to return to aid the exit of Harry McNaughton, who portrayed Gerald Tippett. Saville was told her character and Gerald were to marry and she found the storyline too good to turn down. She appeared for 2 weeks before leaving once again, making her last appearance on 24 September 2010. In May 2012 Libby returned for the show's 20th anniversary alongside the rest of the Jeffries family. Saville enjoyed returning and said being back was; "like returning home! It was fantastic to see all my friends in the crew and cast and hear what everyone has been up to since I left 2 years ago." The character stayed on screen for two weeks and departed on 28 May 2012. Saville enjoyed the brief reprise and stated; "I’m just happy Libby hasn’t died, I love her!"

In 2025, Saville was asked to return as Libby. She embraced the "lovely surprise" and had "thought that chapter might be closed. I’ve made a few quick returns since, but this time it felt different. Past me would probably have been shocked but thrilled knowing Libby was returning to Ferndale to create some laughter and was still on the search for love." Libby returned onscreen on 8 December 2025. Alongside Libby, "Legacy" also saw the returns of Rachel McKenna (Angela Bloomfield) and David Kearney (Peter Elliott), with Producer Oliver Driver believing the three characters were "Icons. Trouble magnets. Agents of chaos" who helped in "owning" the past of Shortland Street.

== Storylines ==
The Jeffries family had been a presence in Ferndale for over a year when the eldest daughter Maia Jeffries (Anna Jullienne) announced her upcoming civil union to partner Jay Copeland (Jaime Passier-Armstrong), which saw the arrival of middle child, Libby. Libby was an accomplished Personal Assistant who opposed the idea of the civil union due to her traditional expectations of marriage. She returned some months after the ceremony and announced her engagement to George Barrington (Sean Lynch), showing her "bridezilla" approach to marriage. George ditched Libby at the ceremony when her younger sister Tania (Faye Smythe) discovered he was gay. Libby decided to stay in Ferndale and secured work as a Personal Assistant to Hospital CEO Huia Samuels (Nicole Kawana).

Living at "El Rancho", a student flat nearby the hospital, Libby soon fell for her flatmate Kieran Mitchell (Adam Rickitt) but his flirtations with hospital receptionist Claire Solomon (Emily Robins) and later, accusation of murdering her, led to the end of the relationship. After moving out, she developed a close friendship with Gerald Tippett (Harry McNaughton) and developed a crush on her new boss, Chris Warner (Michael Galvin). She briefly dated Sunil (Monish Anand) before she got back together with Kieran. The two got engaged however Libby broke it off following Kieran's involvement in criminal gangs. With Chris removed from CEO, she realised she had always loved him and the two began to date. However realising there was mutual attraction between Chris and Gabrielle Jacobs (Virginie Le Brun), Libby showed her mean-streak weakening the relationship. Giving Chris an ultimatum between the two, Libby renovated his house to prove her dedication, but Chris ended up breaking up with her for Gabrielle.

Libby had a rebound fling with Oliver Ritchie (Mark Warren) however it soon turned out he was secretly undertaking viral experiments on live-patients at his flat, ending up nearly killing her until Chris rescued her. Increasingly bored with life in Ferndale, Libby had a brief fling with Chris' cousin Isaac Worthington (Matt Minto) before she left the country to start fresh in America after a final kiss with Chris. She returned some months later having lost her job when her visa experied. Seeking a role in the new private wing of the hospital against her best-friend Gerald, the two soon realised they could marry and secure permanent American residency. Despite initial hesitation from Libby's family, the two wed and departed Ferndale.

Two years later Libby and Gerald returned for Yvonne's (Alison Quigan) birthday in 2012 but it was soon detected that Gerald was in heart failure and required a transplant. He got through the ordeal successfully but Libby decided to separate from him. However the two reconciled and left Ferndale together.

Libby returned to the hospital 13 years later, as maternity-leave cover for Hospital administrator Monique Strutter (Courtenay Louise).

== Character development ==
=== Characterisation ===
Feisty and determined, Libby was satirically diagnosed by Saville with middle child syndrome, who stated; "She was striving for attention when she was younger and didn't really get it so she went off overseas and became an airline marketing manager." Saville enjoyed playing Libby as she; "throws great tantys" and "She's a perfumed rottweiler," However Saville acknowledged that; "She has high expectations and unrealistic ideals."

== Reception ==
Upon her arrival, Libby was branded; "the best thing to arrive on Shortland Street since Evil Dom" and was said that "she also has some of the funniest lines on the show". Lydia Jenkin of The New Zealand Herald was initially irritating but thoroughly enjoyed her during the 2012 feature-length episode and noted her as a highlight.
