= List of Shortland Street characters introduced in 2008 =

The following is a list of characters that first appeared in the New Zealand soap opera Shortland Street in 2008, by order of first appearance.

== Dinesh Jivani ==
Dinesh Jivani
- Shortland Street character
- Portrayed by: Amin Sheikh
- Duration: 2008
- First appearance: 16 January 2008
- Last appearance: 22 May 2008
- Introduced by: Jason Daniel
In-universe information
- Occupation: Surgeon at Shortland Street Hospital (2008)

Dr. Dinesh Jivani was the arranged fiancé of Shanti Kumari (Nisha Madhan). Dinesh arrived to Ferndale with the intention of marrying Shanti as was planned by their parents and quickly got a job at the hospital. However, Joey (Johnny Barker) revealed that Shanti had moved on and Shanti desperately tried to lose Dinesh. However, when her relationship with Scotty (Kiel McNaughton) dissolved, she and Dinesh finally got together. It was not long before the relationship ended however and Dinesh finally realised Shanti would not marry him. He had a one-night stand with Toni Warner (Laura Hill) before returning to India.

== Morgan Braithwaite ==
Morgan Braithwaite
- Portrayed by: Bonnie Soper
- Duration: 2008–09
- First appearance: 5 February 2008
- Last appearance: 18 December 2009
- Introduced by: Jason Daniel
In-universe information
- Other names: Lily Scorpion (alter ego)
- Occupation: Theatre Nurse at Shortland Street Hospital
- Father: William Miller
- Mother: Elizabeth Braithwaite
- Half-brothers: Eric Miller
- Half-sisters: Nicole Kruse-Miller
- Husband: Gerald Tippett (2009)
- Grandmothers: Grandma Miller
- Nephews: Pele Kruse

Morgan Braithwaite (previously Tippett) was the old nursing school friend of serial killer, Joey Henderson (Johnny Barker). She debuted as a recurring character in early 2008 before returning later in the year and featuring in several key storylines. Morgan was interested in the shy Joey but the two's romance never took off and Morgan left town when she discovered he was a murderer.

She returned months later when it was revealed she was buying his items online and soon started up a relationship with Gerald Tippett (Harry McNaughton). However, Gerald's asexuality caused the couple to break up, and Morgan briefly dated Hunter (Lee Donoghue). Morgan agreed to be an illegal surrogate mother to her friend Cindy (Sarah McLeod) and her husband Trent (John Glass) but when she learned she was having triplets and they wanted to abort one, she decided to keep the children. Her romance with Gerald reignited and the two married so as to provide the babies with a stable family. However, Morgan eventually decided to give the babies back and separated from Gerald. She was shocked in late 2009 when new nurse Nicole (Sally Martin), revealed she was Morgan's sister. Morgan's comic books got bought by an Australian company but just days before she was due to leave, she was struck and killed by a car driven by Kieran Mitchell (Adam Rickitt).

== Kath Bennett ==
Kath Bennett
- Shortland Street character
- Portrayed by: Kathryn Rawlings
- Duration: 2008
- First appearance: 18 February 2008
- Last appearance: 11 March 2008
- Introduced by: Jason Daniel
In-universe information
- Sons: Joey Henderson
- Daughters: Lauren Henderson

Kath Bennett was the estranged mother of Joey Henderson (Johnny Barker). Kath arrived to Joey's flat in February 2008 in an attempt to reconcile with her son but Joey refused to get on with his mother and shocked his flatmates when he sent Kath flying to the ground. Kath warned Kieran Mitchell (Adam Rickitt) to keep an eye on Joey and left. Following Joey's death and the revelation he was a serial killer, Kath came into the hospital, having tried to kill herself.

== Rebecca Scott ==
Rebecca Scott
- Shortland Street character
- Portrayed by: Marise Wipani
- Duration: 2008, 2009
- First appearance: 1 April 2008
- Last appearance: 18 December 2009
- Introduced by: Jason Daniel (2008); Steven Zanoski (2009)
In-universe information
- Occupation: Prostitute
- Father: Jimmy Scott
- Mother: Hine Ryan
- Brothers: James Scott; Patrick Scott
- Sons: Jessie Scott
- Daughters: Amy Scott
- Nephews: Kitu Scott (adopted)

Rebecca "Beccs" Scott was the older sister of James "Scotty" Scott (Kiel McNaughton). Shanti (Nisha Madhan) caught Scotty with Rebecca and suspected she was his mistress, however it turned out Scotty was renting out a house to his sister and their father Jimmy (Peter Kaa). Rebecca later attended Scotty and Shanti's wedding and began to date Shanti's brother Sunil (Monish Anand). In 2009 Rebecca moved in with Scotty and Shanti when they were forced to sell her house. However, Shanti soon realised Rebecca was a prostitute. Scotty tried to desperately talk her out of it and after another brief flirtation with Sunil, he left her when he discovered the truth. Rebecca began to work for Kieran Mitchell (Adam Rickitt), but Sean (Thijs Morris) introduced drugs to the business and Rebecca quit in December to pursue a moral career in Wellington. In 2011 Rebecca's mother Hine (Rena Owen) went to live with her and meet her grandchildren.

== Amy Scott ==
Amy Scott
- Shortland Street character
- Portrayed by: Vavaki McNaughton
- Duration: 2008, 2009
- First appearance: 1 April 2008
- Last appearance: 18 December 2009
- Introduced by: Jason Daniel (2008); Steven Zanoski (2009)
In-universe information
- Brothers: Jessie Scott
- Grandfathers: Jimmy Scott
- Grandmothers: Hine Ryan
- Uncles: James Scott; Patrick Scott
- Aunts: Shanti Kumari; Tracey Morrison
- First cousins: Kitu Scott (adopted)

Amy Scott was the young daughter of Rebecca (Marise Wipani). In 2009 her uncle Scotty (Kiel McNaughton) and his wife Shanti (Nisha Madhan) offered to adopt her but were rejected. In 2011 Amy met her grandmother Hine Ryan (Rena Owen).

== Jessie Scott ==
Jessie Scott
- Shortland Street character
- Portrayed by: Apeal McNaughton
- Duration: 2008, 2009
- First appearance: 1 April 2008
- Last appearance: 18 December 2009
- Introduced by: Jason Daniel (2008); Steven Zanoski (2009)
In-universe information
- Sisters: Amy Scott
- Grandfathers: Jimmy Scott
- Grandmothers: Hine Ryan
- Uncles: James Scott; Patrick Scott
- Aunts: Shanti Kumari; Tracey Morrison
- First cousins: Kitu Scott (adopted)

Jessie Scott was the young son of Rebecca (Marise Wipani). In 2009 his uncle Scotty (Kiel McNaughton) and his wife Shanti (Nisha Madhan) offered to adopt him but were rejected. In 2011 Jessie met his grandmother Hine Ryan (Rena Owen).

== Jimmy Scott ==
Jimmy Scott
- Shortland Street character
- Portrayed by: Peter Kaa
- Duration: 2008
- First appearance: 1 April 2008
- Last appearance: 21 July 2008
- Introduced by: Jason Daniel
In-universe information
- Wife: Hine Rangiuia (until 1990)
- Sons: James Scott; Patrick Scott
- Daughters: Rebecca Scott
- Grandsons: Jessie Scott; Kitu Scott (adpoptive)
- Granddaughters: Amy Scott

James "Jimmy" Scott was the alcoholic and gambling addicted father of Scotty (Kiel McNaughton). Scotty was reluctant to let Jimmy get to know his fiancé Shanti (Nisha Madhan) and subsequently the two began to meet privately. Jimmy conned Shanti out of thousands of dollars and when Scotty found out he angrily broke up with Shanti. The two later reconciled and Jimmy attended their wedding. In 2009 Jimmy's daughter Rebecca (Marise Wipani) announced Jimmy had run away and was in huge debt.

== Martha Riley ==
Martha Riley
- Shortland Street character
- Portrayed by: Jacque Drew
- Duration: 2008
- First appearance: 30 April 2008
- Last appearance: 22 July 2008
- Introduced by: Jason Daniel

Martha Riley was the consultant that overlooked the hospital. She brought in Hone Ropata (Temuera Morrison) to replace Chris Warner (Michael Galvin) as CEO and started an affair with Callum McKay (Peter Mochrie). A rivalry broke out between Riley and Callum's wife Justine Jones (Lucy Wigmore) and Riley was devastated when Callum decided to stay with Justine. She later departed the hospital.

== Kingi Te Wake ==
Kingi Te Wake
- Shortland Street character
- Portrayed by: Te Kohe Tuhaka
- Duration: 2008–09
- First appearance: 29 May 2008
- Last appearance: 28 January 2009
- Introduced by: Jason Daniel
In-universe information
- Occupation: Policeman

Kingi Te Wake was the gang member who was involved with the gang; "The Whitetails". Kingi and the gang started to get involved with Kieran Mitchell (Adam Rickitt) and ran several dance parties with him. However, when Kieran cut him out of the business, Kingi kidnapped him and threatened his life. Kingi met Tania Jeffries (Faye Smythe) and fell in love with her but when Tania became too involved with his gang life, he assaulted her in a fit of fury. Days later an upset Kingi confessed he was an undercover cop and when he quit the gang, he and Tania were kidnapped and nearly killed. When they managed to escape, Kingi broke up with Tania, ashamed of what he had done and departed to Australia.

== Anja Sadovenko ==
Anja Sadovenko
- Shortland Street character
- Portrayed by: Reanin Johannink
- Duration: 2008, 2009
- First appearance: 8 May 2008
- Introduced by: Jason Daniel (2008); Steven Zanoski (2009)
In-universe information
- Occupation: Model (until 2009)

Anja Sadovenko was the model who worked with Hunter McKay (Lee Donoghue). She collapsed from exhaustion and drug abuse and was the cause of Hunter leaving the profession. She returned to his life in early 2009, having quit modeling in pursuit of Hunter. However, Hunter was not interested and Anja left.

== Olive Moronuki ==
Olive Moronuki
- Shortland Street character
- Portrayed by: Echo Di Zhu
- Duration: 2008
- First appearance: 10 June 2008
- Last appearance: 12 August 2008
- Introduced by: Jason Daniel

Olive Moronuki was the Japanese school friend of Sophie McKay (Kimberley Crossman).

== Shobna Kumari ==
Shobna Kumari
- Shortland Street character
- Portrayed by: Leela Patel
- Duration: 2008, 2009, 2011
- First appearance: 7 July 2008
- Last appearance: 11 February 2011
- Introduced by: Jason Daniel (2008); Steven Zanoski (2009, 2011)
In-universe information
- Husband: Naveen Kumari (1978—)
- Sons: Sunil Kumari
- Daughters: Shanti Kumari; Grishma Kumari; Dipali Kumari

Shobna Kumari was the troublesome mother of Shanti Kumari (Nisha Madhan). She arrived in 2008 to attend Shanti's marriage to Scotty (Kiel McNaughton) and revealed troubles in her marriage to Naveen (Ajay Vasisht). Following the wedding Shobna was led astray by Yvonne Jeffries (Alison Quigan) and decided to stay in New Zealand. However, she and Naveen reconciled and the family returned to India. She returned in 2009 to visit Shanti and Scotty but the couple were shocked when Shobna renovated their house and announced her intention for plastic surgery. The plastic surgery clinic went broke and Shobna lost thousands of dollars before she departed again. She returned later in the year when Shanti suddenly died from illness. She helped Scotty through the ordeal and left shortly afterwards. In 2011 Shobna returned and offered Yvonne a job in Sydney. She helped reconcile Scotty with his fiancé Tracey (Sarah Thomson) and departed again with Yvonne following shortly after.

== Brooke Freeman ==
Dr. Brooke Freeman was the elusive doctor with a hidden past. She was portrayed by Beth Allen and quickly became a central part of the soap following her high-profile romance with villain – Ethan Pierce (Owen Black).

== Grishma Kumari ==
Grishma Kumari
- Shortland Street character
- Portrayed by: Rina Patel
- Duration: 2008
- First appearance: 21 July 2008
- Last appearance: 25 July 2008
- Introduced by: Jason Daniel
In-universe information
- Father: Naveen Kumari
- Mother: Shobna Kumari
- Brothers: Sunil Kumari
- Sisters: Shanti Kumari; Dipali Kumari
- Uncles: Vijay Kumari
- Aunts: Rani Kumari

Grishma Kumari was the younger sister of Shanti Kumari (Nisha Madhan). She was considered by her family to be unlikely to get a husband and was increasingly displeased at Shanti's marriage to Scotty (Kiel McNaughton). She arrived for the wedding and departed shortly after. In 2009 Grishma could not attend Shanti's funeral as she was violently sick.

== Dipali Kumari ==
Dipali Kumari
- Shortland Street character
- Portrayed by: Rashmi Pilapitaya
- Duration: 2008, 2009
- First appearance: 21 July 2008
- Last appearance: 23 October 2009
- Introduced by: Jason Daniel (2008, 2009)
In-universe information
- Father: Naveen Kumari
- Mother: Shobna Kumari
- Brothers: Sunil Kumari
- Sisters: Shanti Kumari; Grishma Kumari
- Uncles: Vijay Kumari
- Aunts: Rani Kumari

Dipali Kumari was the misguided younger sister of Shanti (Nisha Madhan). Dipali arrived for Shanti's wedding and fell into bed with Kip Denton (Will Hall) after a night of drinking. Dipali wished to pursue a relationship whilst Kip did not. She later left with her family. She returned in 2009 for Shanti's funeral before leaving again.

== Naveen Kumar ==
Naveen Kumari
- Shortland Street character
- Portrayed by: Ajay Vasisht
- Duration: 2008, 2009
- First appearance: 21 July 2008
- Last appearance: 23 October 2009
- Introduced by: Jason Daniel (2008); Steven Zanoski (2009)
In-universe information
- Brothers: Vijay Kumari
- Wife: Shobna Kumari (1978—)
- Sons: Sunil Kumari
- Daughters: Shanti Kumari; Grishma Kumari; Dipali Kumari

Naveen Kumar was the strict father of Shanti Kumari (Nisha Madhan). He arrived for Shanti's wedding and was disappointed his daughter did not marry Dinesh (Amin Sheikh) but soon came around to loving the New Zealand culture. It was soon revealed his marriage with Shobna (Leela Patel) was on the rocks but the two eventually reconciled and departed. Naveen returned in 2009 for Shanti's funeral.

== Nigel Tippett ==
Nigel Tippett
- Shortland Street character
- Portrayed by: Roy Ward
- Duration: 2008, 2009, 2012
- First appearance: 30 July 2008
- Last appearance: 28 May 2012
- Introduced by: Jason Daniel (2008); Steven Zanoski (2009, 2012)
In-universe information
- Wife: Katie Tippett
- Sons: Gerald Tippett

Nigel Tippett was the eccentric father of Gerald Tippett (Harry McNaughton). Morgan Braithwaite (Bonnie Soper) suspected Gerald's parents of molesting him as a boy but this turned out not to be the case as revealed over Gerald's birthday dinner. In 2009 Nigel arrived and announced his wife Katie (Nancy Shroder) had kicked him out of the house and he soon began managing 'The IV' bar much to Gerald's shock. He departed after Katie took him back in. Nigel visited Gerald in hospital in 2012 and was shocked at his condition.

== Katie Tippett ==
Kate Tippett
- Shortland Street character
- Portrayed by: Nancy Shroder
- Duration: 2008
- First appearance: 30 July 2008
- Last appearance: 27 August 2008
- Introduced by: Jason Daniel
In-universe information
- Occupation: Author
- Husband: Nigel Tippett
- Sons: Gerald Tippett

Katherine "Katie" Tippett was the eccentric mother of Gerald Tippett (Harry McNaughton). Morgan Braithwaite (Bonnie Soper) suspected Gerald's parents of molesting him as a boy but this turned out not to be the case as revealed over Gerald's birthday dinner. Katie later visited after returning from Europe. Katie did not visit Gerald when his heart failed in 2012 as she was in Tibet with no cell phone coverage.

== Kane Harvey ==
Kane Harvey
- Shortland Street character
- Portrayed by: Jason Nathan
- Duration: 2008–09
- First appearance: 4 August 2008
- Last appearance: 20 January 2009
- Introduced by: Jason Daniel

Kane Harvey was the leader of the 'Whitetails' gang who kidnapped Kingi Te Wake (Te Kohe Tuhaka) and Tania Jeffries (Faye Smythe) when he discovered Kingi was a police informant. Tania hit Kane with a hammer and the two escaped. Kane was later arrested.

== Tupac Evans ==
Tupac Evans
- Shortland Street character
- Portrayed by: Mauri Oho Stokes
- Duration: 2008–09
- First appearance: 12 August 2008
- Last appearance: 7 December 2009
- Introduced by: Jason Daniel (2008, 2009)
In-universe information
- First cousins: Magic Evans

Tupac Evans was the naive gang member involved with; "The Whitetails". Tupac was taught to play basketball by Kingi (Te Kohe Tuhaka) and ended up saving him and Tania Jeffries (Faye Smythe) when they were kidnapped by gang members. Tupac returned months later when he was in bootcamp with Daniel Potts (Ido Drent). The two initially clashed but ended up good friends and Tupac stayed with Daniel when bootcamp finished. Daniel's step father TK Samuels (Benjamin Mitchell) took Tupac in and taught him to box but Tupac's cousin Magic (Kurt Stowers) introduced Tupac to underground fighting and Daniel nearly died as a result. Tupac became involved in security work but when he began to guard Kieran Mitchell's (Adam Rickitt) brothel, Kieran's brother Sean (Thijs Morris) framed Tupac for faulty drugs that nearly killed a girl and Tupac ended up in jail.

== Ethan Pierce ==
Ethan Pierce
- Shortland Street character
- Portrayed by: Owen Black
- Duration: 2008–09
- First appearance: 20 August 2008
- Last appearance: 4 June 2009
- Introduced by: Jason Daniel (2008); Steven Zanoski (2009)
In-universe information
- Occupation: Head of Surgery at Shortland Street Hospital (2008
- Mother: Joan Pierce

Dr. Ethan Pierce was the manipulative and sadistic doctor who had a past with Brooke Freeman (Beth Allen). Ethan won the job as head of surgery and got the hospital to receive skin grafts from his bio technology company. He went into business with Kieran Mitchell (Adam Rickitt) and started to date Alice Piper (Toni Potter). Ethan started to clash with several members of staff, primarily Callum McKay (Peter Mochrie), Maia Jeffries (Anna Jullienne) and Luke Durville (Gerald Urquhart). Alice discovered Ethan was dating Brooke behind her back and was recording her in bed shortly before Ethan started to harvest body parts to fuel his stem cell company. He murdered an old lady and ended up killing the co owner before he attempted to flee the country, only to end up getting shot three times and killed. In 2009 it was revealed Maia was the killer and in June she began to hallucinate Ethan before finally accepting that she was a killer.

== Trish Gunn ==
Trish Gunn
- Shortland Street character
- Portrayed by: Sheryl Stewart
- Duration: 2008, 2009
- First appearance: 31 August 2008
- Last appearance: 15 April 2009
- Introduced by: Jason Daniel (2008); Steven Zanoski (2009)
In-universe information
- Occupation: Real estate agent (until 2009)
- Sons: Orlando Gunn

Trish Gunn was the determined real estate agent who pressured Scotty (Kiel McNaughton) and Shanti (Nisha Madhan) into purchasing a house. She returned the following year when her son Orando (Chris McLennan-Jones) abused her rights to houses to throw parties. She subsequently lost her job.

== Don Lennox ==
Don Lennox
- Shortland Street character
- Portrayed by: Chris Easly
- Duration: 2008–09
- First appearance: 1 September 2008
- Last appearance: 11 December 2009
- Introduced by: Jason Daniel (2008); Steven Zanoski (2009)
In-universe information
- Occupation: Hitman; Mechanic

Don Lennox was a hitman that worked for corrupt pharmaceutical company – Scott Spear. Don murdered Craig Valentine (Renato Bartolomei) to stop him exposing the company and later attempted to murder Justine Jones (Lucy Wigmore) for her part in the attempted exposure. Kieran Mitchell (Adam Rickitt) later hired Don to murder Ethan Pierce (Owen Black) but Ethan miraculously ended up dead before Don could get to him. Don returned in mid-2009, again hired by Scott Spear to stop Justine from testifying against them however a case of mistaken identity saw Don shoot Brooke Freeman (Beth Allen) instead. In December 2009 Don was brought into the hospital having suffered a gunshot to the chest, under a fake name but Chris Warner (Michael Galvin) recognised him. He ended up dying on the operating table.

== Orlando Gunn ==
Orlando Gunn
- Shortland Street character
- Portrayed by: Chris Maclennan-Jones
- Duration: 2008, 2009
- First appearance: 5 September 2008
- Last appearance: 28 April 2009
- Introduced by: Jason Daniel (2008, 2009)
In-universe information
- Mother: Trish Gunn

Orlando Gunn was the school bully and son of Trish Gunn (Sheryl Stewart). Trish paid Orlando to pretend to be interested in a career in the army so as to lure Scotty (Kiel McNaughton) into using her as her realtor. Orlando returned in 2009 when he was named head boy of Ferndale high opposite Sophie McKay (Kimberley Crossman) as head girl. Orlando started to host parties in his mother's open homes and became friends with Daniel Potts (Ido Drent). However, when the boys took a man hostage in his home, Orlando passed all the blame onto Daniel and the two became enemies. He realised Daniel had a crush on Sophie and so began to date her however when Sophie realised Orlando was claiming they had regular sex and broke up with him. Orlando was later kicked out of his role as headboy.

== Mona McKay ==
Mona McKay
- Shortland Street character
- Portrayed by: Judy Rankin
- Duration: 2008, 2010, 2011
- First appearance: 16 September 2008
- Last appearance: 17 October 2011
- Introduced by: Jason Daniel (2008); Steven Zanoski (2010, 2011)
In-universe information
- Sons: Callum McKay; Gordon McKay
- Grandsons: Hunter McKay
- Granddaughters: Sophie McKay

Mona McKay was the opinionated mother of Callum McKay (Peter Mochrie). She arrived after learning her daughter in law Justine Jones (Lucy Wigmore) had died and quickly got on the bad side of granddaughter Sophie (Kimberley Crossman). Sophie discovered Mona had cancer and she departed shortly after. She returned in 2010 to attend Sophie's marriage to Kieran Mitchell (Adam Rickitt) but was disgusted to learn Callum was living with Rachel (Angela Bloomfield), the accused killer of Morgan (Bonnie Soper). Mona's cancer was revealed to be extremely serious and it was removed via surgery. She departed after realising she was in the way of Callum's happiness. She returned again in 2011 in an attempt to get Callum to pay for an expensive retirement home and quickly clashed with his young girlfriend Jill (Natalie Medlock). She nearly got robbed by conman Derek Hurlihy (David Weatherley) and ended up leaving to live with her other son, Gordon.

== Timothy Carson ==
Timothy Carson
- Shortland Street character
- Portrayed by: Austin Taylor
- Duration: 2008
- First appearance: 6 October 2008
- Last appearance: 4 December 2008
- Introduced by: Jason Daniel
In-universe information
- Mother: Helen Carson

Timothy Carson was the disabled son of Helen Carson (Michelle A'Court). Helen managed to sneak Timothy into having an operation for his Duchenne muscular dystrophy but ended up with HIV following a faulty skin graft from Ethan Pierce (Owen Black).

== Bernadette Hamblyn ==
Bernadette Hamblyn
- Shortland Street character
- Portrayed by: Narelle Ahrens
- Duration: 2008
- First appearance: 8 October 2008
- Last appearance: 31 November 2008
- Introduced by: Jason Daniel
In-universe information
- Occupation: Nurse

Bernadette Hamblyn was Scotty's (Kiel McNaughton) nursing school friend whom began to grow attached to Scotty. Scotty accused her of falling in love with him and a devastated Bernadette revealed she just looked up to him.

== Fraser McKenzie ==
Fraser McKenzie
- Shortland Street character
- Portrayed by: Peter Daube
- Duration: 2008–09
- First appearance: 15 October 2008
- Last appearance: 6 March 2009
- Introduced by: Jason Daniel
In-universe information
- Occupation: Lawyer
- Wife: Deborah McKenzie

Fraser McKenzie was the lawyer who plotted to murder his wife and a potential love interest for Yvonne Jeffries (Alison Quigan). Yvonne met Fraser in October 2008 and hit it off but was devastated when she learned he was married to Deborah (Susan Curnow). However, Deborah had seriously developed Alzheimers, and Fraser was more of a caregiver. Deborah assaulted Yvonne and after surgery, she developed cancer from a faulty skin graft. Fraser helped her through the ordeal and the two began an affair. However, in 2009 Fraser expressed his desire to overdose Deborah on her pills and take her out of her pain. Yvonne was disgusted and they broke up. They parted ways in early 2009 on good terms.

== Deborah McKenzie ==
Deborah McKenzie
- Shortland Street character
- Portrayed by: Susan Curnow
- Duration: 2008–09
- First appearance: 17 October 2008
- Last appearance: 6 March 2009
- Introduced by: Jason Daniel
In-universe information
- Husband: Fraser McKenzie

Deborah McKenzie was the wife of Fraser McKenzie (Peter Daube). Deborah had serious Alzheimer's and struggled to recognise Fraser. She pushed Yvonne Jeffries (Alison Quigan) down a flight of stairs and seriously injured her neck. In late 2008 Yvonne discovered Fraser was considering murdering his wife and stopped seeing the two.

== Stirling Haldane ==
Stirling Haldane
- Shortland Street character
- Portrayed by: Michael Hallows
- Duration: 2008
- First appearance: 24 October 2008
- Last appearance: 19 December 2008
- Introduced by: Jason Daniel
In-universe information
- Occupation: Funeral director

Sterling Haldane was the funeral director who co owned a skin graft company with Ethan Pierce (Owen Black). Sterling supplied bodies to the company illegally and when the bodies ran out, the two were forced to kidnap and murder a pensioner. When the crime came out, Ethan resorted to murdering Sterling to cover his tracks.

== Cindy Watson ==
Cindy Watson
- Shortland Street character
- Portrayed by: Sarah McLeod
- Duration: 2008–09
- First appearance: 11 November 2008
- Last appearance: 5 June 2009
- Introduced by: Jason Daniel
In-universe information
- Occupation: Nurse at Shortland Street Hospital (2009)
- Husband: Trent Watson
- Sons: William Watson
- Daughters: Elizabeth Watson; Catherine Watson

Cindy Watson was the good friend of Morgan Braithwaite (Bonnie Soper). Cindy and her husband Trent (John Glass) visited Morgan and announced her pregnancy. However, days later the couple confirmed they had suffered their third miscarriage and asked Morgan to be an illegal surrogate mother for their child. The pregnancy went straight forward and Cindy started to work at the hospital to keep an eye on Morgan. However, when Morgan discovered she was having triplets, Cindy and Trent requested she abort one of the babies. Morgan decided to keep the children and subsequently Cindy and Trent broke up. The two nervously reconciled and Cindy saved Morgan when she fainted. The two were delighted when she announced they could have the children and departed in June 2009.

In 2010 Cindy rang to express her sadness at the couple not being able to attend Morgan's memorial service.

== Trent Watson ==
Trent Watson
- Shortland Street character
- Portrayed by: John Glass
- Duration: 2008–09
- First appearance: 11 November 2008
- Last appearance: 5 June 2009
- Introduced by: Jason Daniel
In-universe information
- Father: Ian Watson
- Wife: Cindy Watson
- Sons: William Watson
- Daughters: Elizabeth Watson; Catherine Watson

Trent Watson was the husband of Morgan Braithwaite's (Bonnie Soper) good friend, Cindy (Sarah McLeod). Trent and Cindy visited Morgan and announced their pregnancy. However, days later the couple confirmed they had suffered their third miscarriage and asked Morgan to be an illegal surrogate mother for their child. The pregnancy went straight forward however when Morgan discovered she was having triplets, Cindy and Trent requested she abort one of the babies. Morgan decided to keep the children and subsequently Cindy and Trent broke up. Trent tried to get together with Morgan but she declined him and he nervously reconciled with Cindy. The two were delighted when Morgan announced they could have the children and departed in June 2009.

In 2010 Cindy rang to express her sadness at the couple not being able to attend Morgan's memorial service.

== Xavier Moyo ==
Xavier Moyo
- Shortland Street character
- Portrayed by: Brian Manthenga
- Duration: 2008–09
- First appearance: 1 December 2008
- Last appearance: 25 March 2009
- Introduced by: Jason Daniel

Dr. Xavier Moyo was a doctor from Zimbabwe who visited the hospital as part of surgical tourism. He admired his boss Chris Warner (Michael Galvin) but suffered culture shock with the technology used by the New Zealand doctors and continuously clashed with Kip Denton (Will Hall). Xavier started a romance with Alice Piper (Toni Potter) but began to feel guilty for his uneducated family in Zimbabwe and hastily proposed to Alice. She declined and Xavier departed back to his home country.
