= Alison Quigan =

New Zealand actress, director and playwright

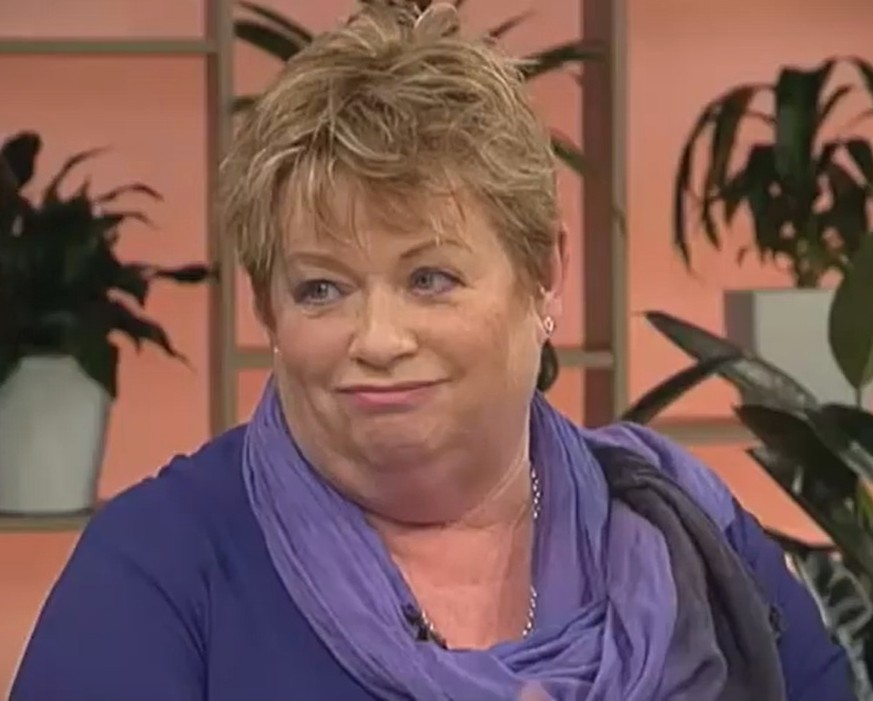
Quigan in 2017

Alison Marie Quigan QSM (born 1952) is a New Zealand actress, director and playwright.

== Biography ==
In 1978, Quigan trained at the Theatre Corporate Actors School in Auckland. She has worked as an actor in Auckland, Palmerston North and Christchurch, and appearing in or directed more than 130 plays. She has also written 12 plays, either as sole playwright or with writing partners Ross Gumbley and Lucy Schmidt.

Quigan was the artistic director of Centrepoint Theatre in Palmerston North for 18 years from 1986 to 2004 where she directed over 60 plays. From 2004 until 2011, Quigan portrayed Yvonne Jeffries in the New Zealand television series Shortland Street. She has been performing arts manager at Māngere Arts Centre – Ngā Tohu O Uenuku since 2013. In an interview with Michele Hewitson from The New Zealand Herald, Quigan is described as "a little-known power house of influence".

Quigan has two grown children. Her daughter, actor Sarah Graham, made her Centrepoint Theatre debut in the 2009 production of Quigan's play Ladies for Hire.

== Awards and honours ==
In the 2001 Queen's Birthday Honours, Quigan was awarded the Queen's Service Medal for public services.

== Plays ==
- 1994 – Five Go Barmy in Palmy (with Ross Gumbley)
- 1995 – Biggles on Top (with Ross Gumbley)
- 1997 – Boys at the Beach (with Ross Gumbley)
- 1998 – Shop Till You Drop (with Ross Gumbley)
- 1999 – The Newbury Hall Dances (with Ross Gumbley) later "Flagons and Foxtrots"
- 2000 – The Big OE (with Ross Gumbley)
- 2001 – Sisters (with Lucy Schmidt)
- 2002 – Netballers (with Lucy Schmidt)
- 2003 – The School Ball
- 2004 – Mum's Choir
- 2004 – Girls Weekend Escape
- 2009 – Ladies for Hire

She also acted as Henrietta Knowby (normal form) in Ash Vs. Evil Dead Season 2. Additionally, she played the customer "Karen" in Viva la Dirt League's "Karen Vs Manager" and "Karen wants a showdown - Karen returns".
