= Joey Henderson =

Fictional character from Shortland Street

- Shortland Street character
- Portrayed by: Johnny Barker
- Duration: 2007–2008
- First appearance: 18 June 2007
- Last appearance: 12 November 2008
- Introduced by: Jason Daniel
In-universe information
- Other names: The Ferndale Strangler
- Occupation: Nurse
- Mother: Kath Bennett
- Sisters: Lauren Henderson

Joseph James "Joey" Henderson is a fictional character on the New Zealand soap opera Shortland Street who was portrayed by Johnny Barker from mid 2007 to early 2008.

Arriving in June 2007 as an eager yet awkward newbie nurse, Joey was a potential love interest for Claire Solomon (Emily Robins). However Claire ended up murdered by an unknown assailant and for the next 6 months, Shortland Street underwent its largest and most dramatic whodunit storyline in its history. After 5 characters were killed off at the hands of a serial killer dubbed "The Ferndale Strangler", Joey was finally unveiled as the murderer in a dramatic season cliffhanger that saw Joey attempt to murder fan favourite, Tania Jeffries (Faye Smythe). The 2008 season donned the title of "The Killer Season" and the Joey storyline finished in three dramatic episodes airing in early March 2008. Since then Joey has appeared in two flashbacks.

The Ferndale Strangler storyline was hugely praised, with both critics and audiences tuning in to witness the dramatic 9 months that unfolded. Barker was nominated for several awards for his portrayal and the character's death was singled out in a bid for suicide prevention. The Ferndale Strangler storyline has since gone down as one of the most iconic moments of the show.

== Creation and casting ==
Producers decided to embark on a whodunit storyline that not only would draw ratings and celebrate the show's 15th anniversary, but also cut out characters that were proving useless and cast that requested to leave. In May 2007 it was announced that Joey would be arriving the following month, he was described as "proficient and eager – some would say over-eager – newbie nurse. Enthusiastic and co-operative, Joey is hungry for approval. He is less confident socially, but sure to be a hit with the ladies of Shortland Street." Barker auditioned for the role and was curious when producers told him to act calm and nice, but on another take asked him to be mean and menacing. Barker enjoyed taking on the role, stating; "He's a little socially inept in not being able to communicate publicly – kind of like me." He made his first appearance on 18 June 2007 with his first line being: "The thing is, I really want to be a doctor." Barker was told at the audition that there would be a question mark hanging over Joey and when Claire died, he realized Joey was the killer. He was officially told four months before the killer reveal.

In January 2008 it was announced that Joey would be written out of the soap later in the year. Joey featured in a three-part episode that aired in March 2008, that featured the death of his character. Joey's final scene aired on 5 March 2008 with his final lines being: "I am Joseph James Henderson. Gone but never forgotten."

== Storylines ==
Joey arrived to Ferndale as a young and eager nurse, desperate to become a doctor. He immediately showed romantic interest in hospital co-worker Claire Solomon (Emily Robins). However, after a date, Joey realised Claire had used him to make Kieran (Adam Rickitt) jealous and he scolded her. Joey started to live with Kieran and was severely beaten by Beth (Hannah Marshall) when he snuck up on her in the carpark, making some of the staff suspect he was the Ferndale Strangler, a serial killer who had murdered Claire, Meg (Emily Mowbray), and Jay (Jaime Passier-Armstrong). On Halloween 2007, nurse Brenda Holloway (Katherine McRae) discovered the identity of the serial killer when investigating a series of mysterious cardiac arrests linked to the killer. Brenda was murdered before she could tell anyone her discovery. Joey became interested in new nurse Tracey Morrison (Sarah Thomson), but after a few dates, he was shocked to see she was two timing him with Gavin Capper (Tim Schijf). He tried to date Tania Jeffries (Faye Smythe) but ended up embarrassed, only for the audience to discover Joey was the Ferndale Strangler when he unsuccessfully attempted to murder her.

Joey continued to stalk Tania but decided to murder Shanti (Nisha Madhan) instead. His plans fell through and he aroused suspicion when he unsuccessfully attempted to murder a random woman on the street who was admitted to the hospital. Joey attempted to date Morgan Braithwaite (Bonnie Soper), a long-time friend from nursing school, but only ended up humiliated and sexually confused. Morgan went missing and the hospital staff began to speculate that Joey was indeed the killer, though the rumours dispelled when Morgan returned from a lengthy holiday. Following a visit from Joey's mother – Kath Bennett (Kath Rowlings) that resulted in him assaulting her, the staff again started to suspect Joey. Detective Lara Wade was sure that Joey was the murderer, however didn't yet have the evidence to convict him. All the while Director of Nursing, James Scott (Shortland Street), continued Brenda's investigation on the cardiac arrests, that were similar to the period of time that coincided with Joey's time working at a hospital in Port Moresby. Before Joey could be caught, he took Tania, Shanti, Morgan, and Alice Piper (Shortland Street) (Toni Potter) out clubbing for a night. Detective Wade sent men to follow Joey, however he evaded them and when he had a moment alone with Alice, he kidnapped her. Alice woke up in a room at a storage facility, full of pictures and ominous sketches of Joey's previous victims on the wall, strapped to a bed with surgical clothes on. Joey used Alice to practice an appendicitis surgery on her, revealing he likely used his previous victims for similar reasons, and nearly killed her in the process. While Alice was in recovery, she managed to escape. While chasing Alice, Joey was found by Craig Valentine and Kieran. Joey taunted both, and Kieran tried to strangle Joey, until Detective Wade stopped him. On the top of a building, cornered, Joey jumped off, killing himself, ending his murderous run on the show. Joey had six victims, an ex-girlfriend from his previous job at Port Moresby, as well as Claire, Meg, Jay, Beth, and Brenda.

Later, Alice had a nightmare depicting Joey. She envisioned him when she practiced shooting.

== Character development ==
"Personally, I always like to see someone come into something that's all lovely and tear the place to shreds, which is what Joey did"

— Johnny Barker on his characters ruthless introduction.

=== Characterisation ===
Upon arrival, Joey was shown as a shy and eager newbie nurse. He was socially awkward but determined at work. However, by the time Joey is revealed as the killer, his true colours have surfaced and he is shown to be extremely judgemental, showing homophobia, sizeism, racism and elitism. When he caught on that Joey was going to turn out to be the killer, Barker purposely made his character more humorous and goofy, so as to make it as least obvious as possible. He sought inspiration from the character of J.D. from Scrubs and after the killer reveal, Dexter Morgan from Dexter. On screen, Joey is diagnosed with MacDonald's triad by the police. A condition that sees a young child torture animals and wet their bed which potentially show's they will grow into a psychopathic adult. Barker described Joey as a "dork." In March 2008, Joey's childhood was further explored and it was revealed that Joey had been beaten by his father and was left with his grandmother after he strangled his sister. He had taken his anger from his fathers beatings out on neighborhood animals. The detectives suggested that Joey could have potentially murdered his grandmother, though it was never confirmed.

=== The Ferndale Strangler ===
Producers of the show decided to embark on a whodunit storyline that would celebrate the show's 15th anniversary, draw ratings and clean out the cast. The storyline was to be the biggest whodunit in the shows history and would wipe out characters such as Mark Weston, who was proving useless, and Jay Copeland after her actress decided to leave. Producer Jason Daniel voiced that the storyline was chosen also for the "challenge," stating; "To do a really good whodunnit means telling a really good mystery story across several weeks or months. Normally serials don't do that because it's hard to maintain mystery over a long period. You have to keep all of those clues and the factual evidence of the story consistent."

In July 2007, Claire Solomon's body was discovered but it was not until Meg's body was discovered a month later that the characters and the audience realised there was a serial killer. Fan favourite character Jay Copeland was also murdered, and guest character Beth went missing only to be discovered dead as well. When alcoholic nurse Brenda Holloway came close to discovering the identity of the killer, she was murdered on Halloween by the killer disguised as George W. Bush. Not even the true killer's actor knew they were the killer, with actors taking bets. No one was above suspicion – even women were suspects – and Daniel ensured that the deaths were all part of the storytelling rather than pointless killing, saying; "Each incident is different from the one before so that it's not just a question of people dying relentlessly. They all add something to the story and provide us with a few more clues and a few more red herrings." Four endings were filmed so as to keep the killer a mystery. In December 2007, Joey was revealed as the killer. Daniel was sure some fans would be disappointed that Joey was the killer but speculated it was an accurate portrayal with many killers being those who you would least expect.

Daniel announced the 2008 season would focus on Joey, stating; "You are seeing it from his point of view why he likes working at the hospital, as he has this fascination with all things medical. It's like a playground for him. We see his extracurricular activity, the amount of time he devotes to studying for the next procedure and stalking people and where he stashes all his medical equipment." Only a few writers knew the true identity and false scripts were circulated to avoid guessing. As the storyline came to a close, fan site reaction started to garner negativity and producers decided to end Joey's reign in a dramatic three part episode. Barker particularly enjoyed filming the climax scenes, saying; "The scenes were awesome... I put on the crazy hat and it was super fun to do that."

== Reception ==
Before and after the killer reveal, Joey proved to be a highly popular character, being voted "Favourite Male Character," "Favourite New Character," "Hottest Male Character," "Favourite Male Actor" and "Best Storyline" in the Throng Shortland Street Fan Awards 2007. The following year Joey won "Best Storyline," "Best Single Episode" and "Best Thing to Happen in the Year." Voters also wished for Joey to return in 2009, either as a ghost, twin or in flashbacks. In 2012, the character was named as one of the standout characters of the show's first 20 years. The storyline was also voted by fans as one of the show's most iconic. In 2017 stuff.co.nz journalist Fleur Mealing named Joey as the 4th character she most wanted to return for the show's 25th anniversary, citing the possibility of his ghost. The New Zealand Woman's Day magazine listed Joey as the 15th best character of the soap's first 25 years.

The serial killer storyline received a huge surge in viewers with 624,000 tuning in to see Joey revealed as the killer and over 600,000 tuning into the characters demise. The accurate portrayal of Joey led many to fear for Barker's safety, and for producer Jason Daniel to ensure Barker will be kept safe from angry fans. Barker hoped his portrayal would influence viewers, stating; "Grandmothers are going to hate me, kids are going to be scared of me, teenagers are going to think I'm hilarious – hopefully, and all those cynical people who don't like Shortland Street, but have got stuck into watching it, I think they'll appreciate it." The storyline was referred to as a "water cooler" topic.

Barker was nominated for the 2008 Qantas Film and Television Awards for Best Supporting Actor alongside Kirk Torrance and Tammy Davis. The award was given to Davis for his portrayal of Munter in Outrageous Fortune. Barker was also nominated for the 2009 Best Actor award in the TV Guide Best on the Box Awards 2009 for his work throughout 2008.

Joey's death was specified as one of the targets in the 2008 Suicide Prevention Plan launched by Associate Health Minister Jim Anderton to help accurately depict suicide on television.

Shane Cortese who played killer Dominic Thompson on the show for 2 years, praised Barker for his portrayal and stated: "I wouldn't be at all surprised if it's the start of big stuff for Johnny as he will always be remembered as the Shortland Street serial killer and it will do wonders for his career." Chris Brush the deputy editor of the New Zealand TV Guide, compared Joey to Coronation Street villain Richard Hillman, stating the two were both great characters and ratings wonders. In 2012, Shortland Street cast member Geordie Holibar (Phoenix Raynor) recollected on his past viewing of the soap opera and named the Joey storyline as his "favourite".
