= Peter Daube =

New Zealand film actor

- Born: 1964 (age 61–62); New Zealand
- Occupation: Actor
- Years active: 1991–present

Peter Daube (born 1964) is a New Zealand film, television, stage and voice actor. Daube graduated from Toi Whakaari: New Zealand Drama School in 1992 with a Diploma in Acting, and upgraded it to a Bachelor of Performing Arts (Acting) in 2010. Two of his better-known roles to date are that of Ozul in Maddigan's Quest, and the voice of Sculpin in Power Rangers Mystic Force. In 2018, Daube appeared in the Sydney pop-up Globe's production of The Merchant of Venice as Shylock.

== Filmography ==
=== Film ===
Year	Title	Role	Notes
1993	Traffic Island	Scaz	
1993	Eau de la vie	Tank Man	Short
1994	The Last Tattoo	U.S. Airman	
1995	Bitch	Paul	Short
2000	Truth About Demons	Lawrence	
2001	Stickmen	Pink Shirt Man	
2002	John & Pogo	John Barrel	Short
2002	Tongan Ninja	Chef Guy	
2010	The Warrior's Way	Hell Rider	
2017	Human Traces	Dale	

=== Television ===
Year	Title	Role	Notes
1995	Hercules: The Legendary Journeys	Spiros	"The Gauntlet"
1996	Xena: Warrior Princess	Petracles	"A Fistful of Dinars"
1998	The Adventures of Swiss Family Robinson	Joseph Creel	"Invasion: Parts 1, 2 & 3"
1998	The Legend of William Tell	Warrior	"The Labyrinth"
1999	A Twist in the Tale	Sven Olafsen	"Darkness Visible"
1999	Duggan	Charlie	"A Shadow of Doubt: Parts 1 & 2"
2000	Dark Knight	Sir Gerard of York	"Ultimate Sword"
2003	The Strip	Randall	"Fish Out of Water"
2003	Mercy Peak	Anton Devcich	Recurring role
2004	Power Rangers Dino Thunder	Dr. Norton Morton (voice)	"Isn't It Lava-ly"
2006	Maddigan's Quest	Ozul	Regular role
2006	Orange Roughies	David Chambers	"1.1", "1.6"
2006	Power Rangers Mystic Force	Sculpin (voice)	Recurring role
2007	The Amazing Extraordinary Friends	Mad Mike Molloy (voice)	"Mad Mike Molloy"
2008–09	Shortland Street	Fraser McKenzie	Recurring role
2010	Legend of the Seeker	General Grix	"Resurrection"
2011	Waitangi: What Really Happened	Williams	TV film
2011	Power Rangers Samurai	Robtish (voice)	"Test of the Leader", "Jayden's Challenge", "Party Monsters"
2012	Hounds	Chris	Regular role
2014	Power Rangers Megaforce	Pacha Chamak (voice)	"Spirit of the Tiger"
2015	The Brokenwood Mysteries	Slim Fingers	"Blood Pink"
2015–16	Power Rangers Dino Charge	Sting Rage (voice)	Recurring role
2016	Hillary	Eric Shipton	"Standing Tall", "Louise", "Everest"
2020	Power Rangers Beast Morphers	Boxertron (voice)	"Boxed In"

=== Theatre ===
Year	Title	Role
1991	Who Killed Richard Cory?	
1992	Two Gentlemen of Verona	
1992	Separate Tables	John
1993	Too Much Punch for Judy	
1993	Five Angels	
1994	Whakakotahi	Joel / Iann
1994	Lovelocks Dream Run	
1994	Bouncers	Ralph
1996	Under Vernon	Yovgut Acne
1996	Picasso at the Lapin Agile	Elvis
1997	The Herbal Bed	Rafe Smith
1997	Desire Under the Elms	Peter
1997	Cyrano De Bergerac	Christian
1997	Agamemnon	Various
1998	The Farm	Konstantin
1998	Cabaret	Emcee
1998	Eulogy	Dr. Hans Schumann
1999	The Sojourns of Boy	L.C.
2001	Waterloo Sunset	Terry
2001	The Blue Room	All Male Roles
2001	Rosencrantz and Guildenstern Are Dead	Claudius
2001	Noises Off	Gary Lejeune
2001	Irish Annals of Aotearoa	Padraic
2002	The Cherry Orchard	Yepihodov
2002	The Birthday Party	Stanley
2002	Macbeth	Macbeth
2004	Macbeth	Banquo
2004	Caligula	Cassius
2005	Sex with Strangers	
2005	The Duchess of Malfi	Pescara
2007	The Crucible	John Proctor
2008	Dark Tourist AK 07	Dancer
2008	Cat on a Hot Tin Roof	Rev. Tooker
