= Sarah McLeod =

New Zealand film and television actress

- Born: 18 July 1971 (age 55); Putāruru, New Zealand
- Years active: 1994–2012

Sarah McLeod (born 18 July 1971) is a New Zealand film and television actress. Her most notable role was in the Peter Jackson films The Lord of the Rings: The Fellowship of the Ring and The Lord of the Rings: The Return of the King as Rosie Cotton, a female hobbit who marries Samwise Gamgee. McLeod also co-starred in the New Zealand soap opera Shortland Street as Cindy Watson from 2008 to 2009.

== Career ==
McLeod knew Liz Mulane, the casting director of Peter Jackson's The Lord of the Rings from an earlier film of his that she had appeared in called Forgotten Silver. McLeod was six months pregnant when she auditioned for the role of Rosie Cotton, a female hobbit. Four months later, she was told that she had won the role. She explained, "This was after I had the baby, so my first day on the set, the baby was 12 weeks old. So from the first time I auditioned for the role, until the whole thing comes out, the third film, my baby will be four years old, it just goes to show you how big and long this production is." Her daughter, Maisy, played the infant son of Rosie and Samwise Gamgee, seen in the final scene of The Lord of the Rings: The Return of the King. The New Zealand Herald observed in 2004 that McLeod was "notable for having the most significant role of the few New Zealand actresses in the trilogy." In 2007, McLeod and fourteen other Lord of the Rings actors from New Zealand sued New Line, as they felt they were legally entitled to five percent of the trilogy's net merchandising revenue.

From 2008 to 2009, McLeod co-starred in the New Zealand soap opera Shortland Street as Cindy Watson. McLeod conducted legal and personal research on surrogacy for the role, as her character's storyline involved asking her friend to be a surrogate mother for Cindy and her husband. In a 2010 episode of America's Next Top Model, McLeod appeared as herself on the set of Hobbiton, where the contestants participated in a Lord of the Rings-themed photo shoot.
