= Kieran Mitchell =

- Shortland Street character
- Portrayed by: Adam Rickitt
- Duration: 2007–2010
- First appearance: Episode 3689; 15 March 2007
- Last appearance: 2 August 2010
- Introduced by: Jason Daniel
In-universe information
- Occupation: Owner of the IV and the Shortland Street Cafe (2007–2010)
- Father: Sidney Mitchell
- Brothers: Sean Mitchell; Sid Mitchell Junior
- Wife: Sophie McKay (2010)

Kieran Mitchell is a fictional character on the New Zealand soap opera Shortland Street who was portrayed by British actor Adam Rickitt through numerous high-profile storylines from early 2007 to mid-2010.

The character arrived to the soap as a mysterious love interest for Claire Solomon (Emily Robins), only to go through a storyline that saw Kieran discover he has a brain tumour, memory losses and is really a pimp from Thailand. His criminal past sends Kieran to the forefront of the show during a storyline which saw Claire and 4 other characters murdered by a psychopathic serial killer who later turned out to be Kieran's flatmate. Kieran's story arc's would often see him portrayed as an antagonist but the character also had numerous romances and light storylines, including two engagements to Libby Jeffries (Fleur Saville) and a short lived marriage to schoolgirl Sophie McKay (Kimberley Crossman). Becoming the owner of the hospital's local bar The I.V, Kieran found himself performing numerous criminal deeds, culminating in 2009 when he accidentally hit and killed good friend Morgan Braithwaite (Bonnie Soper) in his car. The character's criminal past finally caught up with him in 2010 and he was killed, falling off a cliff while fighting with an ex-enemy in the show's first ever 90-minute episode.

== Creation and casting ==
The character of Kieran Mitchell had been planned for years but producers were struggling to find a suitable casting choice and subsequently the character was pushed back several times. Adam Rickitt was set to visit New Zealand to work on a film and after talking with a friend who worked in casting at Shortland Street, Rickitt was offered the role. Producer Jason Daniel stated, "It just so happened that we were introducing a new character who was a perfect fit for Adam, and after reading the character profile he was very keen to play the role". Rickitt was given opportunity of creative freedom as the characters story lines were not fully formed. After learning about the character and his upcoming storylines, Rickitt decided, "I’ve got to do this". He signed a 3-month recurring contract. In February 2007 the casting was made public and the character was announced to be a "mysterious British traveler". The character was promised to have a dark past and several romance story lines. Rickitt stated, "The character I'm playing has so much potential and I am really excited about getting to know him". Kieran made his debut on screen on 15 March 2007. In June, Rickitt extended his stay on the show when he signed a further 1-year contract. In 2008 Rickitt decided to stay as a regular fixture on the soap due to storylines involving romance with Libby Jeffries (Fleur Saville) and the reemergence of Kieran's 'dark side'.

In 2009 Steven Zanoski replaced Jason Daniel as producer and decided to significantly change the character of Kieran. However within a year the character had "hit a brick wall" and producers decided to write the character out. In December 2009, Rickitt was informed he would be getting written out of the soap. Zanoski commented on the departure: "I think for that character we would always have had to do something big. He has been larger than life, and has taken the stories on different directions to other characters on Shortland Street. I think part of that was because Kieran didn't have a medical qualification, he wasn't part of the hospital, he formed some of the extended world of Shortland Street as the manager of the bar and he came in with quite a deep, dark back story and that kept playing out on screen in the things he was doing, choices he was making,". A 90-minute episode had been planned for 2010 and it was decided Kieran's departure would suit the time frame. Zanoski explained, stating; "Being able to tell [Kieran's] story within the context of 90 minutes was a different thing for us. Rather than extending it over a couple of weeks we were able to make quite a satisfying beginning, middle and end within one episode."

It was announced in March 2010 that Kieran would be departing the show later in the year and that it would be an 'explosive event' and 'the biggest storyline since Joey'. It was soon confirmed that Kieran would depart on the shows first ever 90-minute episode in August. Kieran made his last appearance on 2 August 2010, where the character was seen falling from a cliff. The scene was the first in the soap to utilize green screen technology and Rickitt was pleased to be a part of it, "The best and saddest of days, best because it was a chance to be a part of Shorty's biggest ever production to date, and saddest because I knew it was the closing curtain on the journey of Kieran." Producers ensured that the body of Kieran was not viewed on screen so as to leave an ambiguity over whether he had really died. Zanoski commented on Kieran's final scene, "The important thing about this episode is that even though it's saying goodbye to the character of Kieran, it's certainly not an ending." Rickitt also expressed his interest to reprise the role, "I don't think it's the end. I love the place too much."

== Storylines ==
Kieran arrived to Ferndale after crashing his bike and started to flat with Claire Solomon (Emily Robins) and Libby Jeffries (Fleur Saville), whom he started to date. However it soon became clear Kieran had serious memory problems and he was forced to pay off prostitute Suchin Srisai (Kristine Caluya). Kieran had an affair with Claire and she was found murdered. Kieran was arrested but later cleared of the crime and he ended up buying the local restaurant – The I.V. following the removal of a brain tumour. Claire's killer was later said to be a serial killer and four more were killed. As things started to go well between him and Libby, Joey Henderson (Johnny Barker) was exposed as the Ferndale Strangler and Kieran tried killing him on a rooftop. During the aftermath, Kieran and Libby reconciled in 2008 but he started to get involved with gangs and hired a hitman to murder business partner Ethan Pierce (Owen Black) after Kieran exposed him as a killer for a medical supplies company, Nessus Bio, and that Ethan had harvested bones for the company. But every time Kieran tried going to the police, Ethan managed to frame Kieran as a worker for the company and linked to the murder of an old woman.

In 2009 Libby discovered the true extent of Kieran's crimes and left him. Kieran had a brief fling with Brooke Freeman (Beth Allen) and successfully avoided jail time for his gang affiliations. Kieran was shocked when he discovered Sophie McKay (Kimberley Crossman) had fallen for him but it was not long before the two were in a heated affair and got engaged much to the horror of Sophie's family and several others. Kieran gained many enemies after him and Sophie were exposed and Sophie's ex-boyfriend nearly cost Kieran in his life. Kieran was later shocked when his brother Sean (Thijs Morris)arrived in Ferndale. In Shortland Street's 2009 Cliffhanger, Kieran accidentally hit and killed Morgan Braithwaite (Bonnie Soper) in his car whilst chasing Sean and framed Rachel McKenna (Angela Bloomfield) for the act. Kieran was arrested for the murder during his and Sophie's wedding but Sean took the blame and Kieran and Sophie got married. However, when Kieran was blackmailed by Jane Perry (Sia Trokenheim) for Morgan's death, the marriage ended. Kieran later found himself involved in gangs again and after his life was threatened, Kieran got kidnapped by ex criminal rival White Dragon (Matt Sunderland). Following a chase through a forest, White Dragon fell to his death off a cliff and Kieran sacrificed himself to save Sean after confessing to Morgans death.

Kieran's body was found four months later police identified a body and alerted Sophie.

== Character development ==
In 2009, as part of trying to tame the character down, producers decided to pair the 32-year-old character of Kieran with 17-year-old character, Sophie McKay (Kimberley Crossman). Scenes were aired featuring the characters throughout early 2009 and it soon was made clear that Sophie had developed a crush on the dodgy barman. Crossman commented, "I think her attraction to Kieran comes from an adult that she can trust, because her parents are both heavily unfaithful, and he's someone that she looks up to as a successful male. He doesn't have all the crap she's had to deal with, with her past boyfriends about being immature. But it is more than that. She actually genuinely like him and likes the way he makes her feel" Rickitt believed the two characters developing feelings were for the right reasons, "The thing with Kieran is that even though he's dodgy, he very moralistic ... he will not take advantage of people who he thinks are vulnerable ... She's not trying to sleep with him because she wants something to say to her mates. She's not doing it because she wants to just shag the boss. She's doing it because she's genuinely falling for him." Kieran and Sophie started an affair and Sophie subsequently broke it off Daniel (Ido Drent). However Daniel discovered the torrid affair and took drastic measures, Drent explained, "Daniel knew that there was something going on that Sophie wasn't being honest about. But he certainly didn't expect the truth to be this shocking." Daniel ended up getting his friend Tupac Evans (Mauri Oho Stokes) to attack Kieran, knocking him unconscious with a crowbar. In December 2009, Kieran accidentally ran down and killed Morgan Braithwaite (Bonnie Soper) in his car and framed a drunken Rachel McKenna (Angela Bloomfield). However he was crippled with guilt and Rickitt believed it spelt a possible end to Kieran's relationship with Sophie, "When Kieran becomes reticent with Sophie because of the guilt he's harboring, she can't help but think it has something to do with her. But when Sophie challenges him to open up to her, Kieran's remorse turns to anger and he sharply backs her off. At this point, Kieran becomes really concerned that he is going to lose Sophie. He knows that he's got to seriously up his game in order to get things back on track." Sophie was left "terrified" when she learned from Kieran's ex fiancé, Libby Jeffries (Fleur Saville), that he was still involved in criminal activities. The couple ended up getting married but his guilt over Morgan lead the two to break up. Rickitt believed that there was still hope for the romance however, "Kieran is going to love Sophie until the day he dies. For him, it's never over with Sophie and that's one of the things he's carrying guilt for. He spoilt what was probably the most beautiful part of his life."

837,530 households witnessed Kieran sacrifice himself after admitting to killing Morgan.

== Reception ==
Producer – Jason Daniel named the introduction of Kieran as one of the highlights of his time with the soap, stating: "People had certain expectations for what he would be like and what type of character we would create for him and I think we subverted them all," Kieran's death saw the show receive huge ratings, becoming the second ever most watched episode of Shortland Street to ever air.

Kieran's death was the highest rating episode in over 5 years.
