= Bonnie Soper =

New Zealand actress

- Born: Bonnie Soper; 1984 (age 41–42); Invercargill, New Zealand
- Occupation: Actress
- Years active: 2007–present

Bonnie Soper (born 1984 in Invercargill, New Zealand) is a New Zealand film and television actress. She is known for playing Princess Diana in Harry & Meghan: A Royal Romance. In 2009, Soper received the award for Best Supporting Actress for her outstanding performance in the movie, The Map Reader at 2009 Qantas Film and Television Awards.

== Early career ==
A graduate of the Unitec School of Performing and Screen Arts, her theatre credits include, Auckland Theatre Company's 2007 play The Pillowman which she co-starred in with former and current Shortland Street actors Oliver Driver and Craig Parker.

In 2006, Soper scored a lead role in the New Zealand feature film The Devil Dared Me To, released in cinemas on 11 October 2007. In Arkles Entertainment's feature film The Map Reader, scheduled to be released in 2008, she played a young blind woman. Other credits include the short film We The Living, commercials and a music video for New Zealand band Dimmer.

In 2007, she featured in New Zealand band Deja Voodoo's music video "Tracey", a song from the soundtrack of her film debut The Devil Dared Me To. Bonnie has appeared in the music video The Night, performed by New Zealand band Goodnight Nurse. The video was released in Australia and New Zealand on 4 February 2008.

== Shortland Street ==
She is best known for her role of Morgan Braithwaite on the long-running New Zealand soap opera Shortland Street. Her first scenes were on the episode based on a day in the life of Joey Henderson, the Shortland Street serial killer, which screened on 5 February 2008.

On 16 February 2008, Southland Times newspaper revealed that Bonnie's Shortland Street contract had been extended to three months after initially being contracted for three to six weeks. It was announced on 17 April 2008 that she will be returning to the show on 5 May. She appeared on the 2008 cast photo. Bonnie was then a full-time cast member and was featured in the opening credits.

On Friday 18 December 2009, Bonnie left the show as her character was accidentally killed by Kieran Mitchell, who is portrayed by Adam Rickitt.

== Personal life ==
She is a keen swimmer, taking part in the Mount Maunganui Sovereign Sand To Surf in March 2009 and in the North Shore King of the Bays swim in April 2009. After leaving Shortland Street at the end of 2009, Bonnie moved back to Invercargill, before later moving to Los Angeles.

== Filmography ==
Film and television
Year	Title	Role	Notes
2006	Billy for Lilly	Lilly	Short film
2006	We the Living	Sonja	Short film
2007	The Devil Dared Me To	Tracy 'Tragedy' Jones	Feature film
2008	The Map Reader	Mary	Feature film
2008–2009	Shortland Street	Morgan Braithwaite	Regular role
2010	Stolen	TV Reporter	TV film
2014	ANZAC Girls	Jessie Verey	TV miniseries
2016–17	Filthy Rich	Annabelle Maxwell	Recurring role
2018	Harry & Meghan: A Royal Romance	Princess Diana	TV film
2018	The Box	Mom	Short film
2019	Harry & Meghan: Becoming Royal	Princess Diana	TV film
2021	Harry & Meghan: Escaping the Palace	Princess Diana	TV film
2022	Mystery Incorporated	Peggy Jones	1 episode

== Theatre ==
Year	Title	Role	Notes
2003	Watch This Space	Various	
2003	Spinning Tales		
2004	Spring Awakening	Thea	
2004	At the Bay	Anne	
2005	On Our Own	Elsie	
2005	La Morta Finta	Mercutio / Apothecary	
2005	Home Grown	Rachel	
2005	Happy End		
2005	Balm in Gilead	Darlene	
2007	'Tis Pity She's a Whore	Annabella	
2007	The Pillowman	The Mother	
