= Toni Potter =

New Zealand actress

Toni Potter (born 1978 or 1979) is a New Zealand actress, best known for her role on the New Zealand medical drama, Shortland Street.

== Early life ==
Potter grew up with her sister, mother and father who was in the army in Papakura, Waiouru and Upper Hutt. She spent her high school years in Christchurch where she acted with community theatre groups including outdoor Shakespeare productions and Contemporary dance groups. She moved to Auckland in 1998 to take up a place in the Bachelor of Performing Arts degree at UNITEC, majoring in acting.

== Shortland Street ==
Potter played Alice Piper, a senior nurse troubled by alcohol and severe bad luck with men, from 2005 to 2009. She featured in a number of major storylines, including one in 2008 in which she was captured by Joey Henderson, who was revealed as the Ferndale Strangler. He took out her appendix, but she managed to escape him. In 2008 she broke up with her long-term boyfriend Craig Valentine, after he found out that she slept with Guy Warner, a mutual friend after a drunken fit of weakness. She then had to cope with the murder of Craig, and not soon after, give birth to the couple's daughter Kelly Piper, who was born in the back of an ambulance the day Craig was found dead. Kelly died soon after because of complications from being prematurely born. Alice then became involved with Ethan Pierce, a doctor who was discovered as a criminal. She then had to help her friend Maia Jeffries cover up Ethan's murder that Maia had committed. Potter left the show late 2009, when Alice accompanied a close friend and colleague, Kip Denton to Rarotonga, where they decided they wanted to start a life together and have remained ever since. It is unknown if the characters will return.

== Recognition ==
In 2008, Potter was nominated under the category of best performance by an actress in general television in the Qantas Film and Television Awards. She lost out to Robyn Malcolm.
