= Fleur Saville =

New Zealand actress (born 1984)

- Born: 14 July 1984 (age 42); Auckland, New Zealand
- Occupation: Actress
- Years active: 2001–2017, 2022–present (As Actress); 2014–2017 (As Producer)

Fleur Saville (born 14 July 1984) is a New Zealand television actress best known for her roles in the television sitcoms Being Eve and The Tribe in which she became known to international audiences for her portrayal of Ruby. Saville previously acted on New Zealand soap opera Shortland Street, playing the personal assistant Libby Jeffries for the CEO of Shortland Street Hospital.

Saville has many interests, including horse riding and martial arts. She also enjoys a close friendship with actresses who played her on-screen sisters, Anna Jullienne and Faye Smythe, and Beth Allen, who played Dr Brooke Freeman. Since her days in Shortland Street, Saville has made sporadic appearances in television. Since 2017, she has retired from acting and remains out of the spotlight. In 2022, she returned to acting.

== Early years ==
Saville has played many theatrical roles on stage and in theatres all around the country, such as The Sound of Music, Charlie and the Chocolate Factory and the musical production of Oliver!.

== Filmography ==
=== Film ===
Year	Title	Role	Notes
2006	Sione's Wedding	Bar Hottie	
2013	I Love L.A.	Meddie	Short film
2014	Blood Punch	Claire	

=== Television ===
Year	Title	Role	Notes
2001–02	Being Eve	Eve Baxter	Lead role
2003	The Tribe	Ruby	Main role
2004	Serial Killers	Kirsty	TV series
2005	Interrogation	Jolie	"Tick Tock"
2006	Maddigan's Quest	Silver Girl	Recurring role
2006–2010, 2012, 2025–	Shortland Street	Libby Jeffries	Regular role
2011	Tangiwai	Eva Peacocke	TV film
2011	Underbelly NZ: Land of the Long Green Cloud	Sue McPherson	Recurring role
2012	Liz & Dick	Sally Hay Burton	TV film
2014	Try This Instead	Code-Switching White Woman	TV series
2014	HelLA	Hollywood Assistant	"LA Coffee Shops"
2017	The Video Store	Fleur	TV miniseries
2022	Celebrity Family Feud	Self	Episode aired: 7th August
2026	The Brokenwood Mysteries	Zelda Belfan	Episode: "They're Out There Alright"

=== Theatre ===
Year	Title	Role	Theatre
2004	Oklahoma!	Chorus	Pumphouse Theatre
2004	A Slice of Saturday Night	Sharon	Rose Centre
2004	Fiddler on the Roof	Daughter	Pumphouse Theatre
2004	Oliver!		Pumphouse Theatre
2004	Joseph and the Amazing Technicolor Dreamcoat	Narrator	Rangitoto College
2004	Charlie and the Chocolate Factory	Veruca Salt	
2004	The Sound of Music	Brigitta	Bruce Mason Theatre
2004	New Gold Dream	Stephanie	Auckland Theatre Company
2005	Sex with Strangers	Stranger	Herald Theatre
2007	Lobby Hero	Dawn	Silo Theatre
2008	The Reindeer Monologues	Vixen	Basement Theatre
2009	Andy Clay's Book of Love	Susan	NZ International Comedy Festival
2010	The Vagina Monologues	Woman	Basement Theatre
2015	The Sound of Music		

== Voice work ==
Saville has done many voice overs for television commercials, including Wella Bellady, Environment Waikato, Road Safety, Route 66 & McDonald's. She also voiced Diva from the video game Final Fantasy Type-0 HD in 2015 as well as The Elder Scrolls Online: Gold Road in 2024.
