= Tania Jeffries =

- Shortland Street character
- Portrayed by: Faye Smythe
- Duration: 2005–2010, 2012
- First appearance: 29 March 2005
- Last appearance: 28 May 2012
- Introduced by: Harriet Crampton (2005); Steven Zanoski (2012)
In-universe information
- Occupation: Nurse
- Father: Ian Jeffries
- Mother: Yvonne Jeffries
- Brothers: Hamish Flynn
- Sisters: Maia Jeffries; Libby Jeffries
- Husband: Mark Weston (2007)
- Grandmothers: Phyllis Gregory
- Aunts: Eileen Horrocks; Janice Gregory
- Nephews: Peter Flynn; Jay "JJ" Jeffries
- Nieces: Amber Flynn
- First cousins: Richard Horrocks; Simon Horrocks; Anna Horrocks

Tania Jeffries (previously Weston) is a fictional character on the New Zealand soap opera Shortland Street. She was portrayed by Faye Smythe from 2005 to 2010, with the character starring in numerous high-profile storylines alongside her on screen family. The character returned in May 2012 as part of the show's 20th anniversary.

== Creation and casting ==
Shortly into her sister Maia Jeffries stint, the Jeffries' family was introduced and expanded.

Faye Smythe left the show in 2010 and by this time most of the Jeffries family had disbanded and Alison Quigan (Yvonne Jeffries) believed they had, "run out of steam" With Quigan and Jullienne being the sole remaining members of the Jeffries', both decided to quit, with Jullienne deciding to spend more time with her recent husband. Maia, the last remaining Jeffries family member on the show made her final appearance on 9 February 2011. The following year producers discovered that all the actors of the Jeffries' family were available to film in early 2012 and the decision was made to reintroduce the family as celebration of the show's 20th anniversary. Jullienne revealed the return during an interview with Woman's Day in April. Television New Zealand confirmed that all the surviving members of the family would return on screen in May 2012. Jullienne stated, "It's been great to be part of the 20th celebrations, Shortland Street was a huge part of my life for years and I'm happy to celebrate its great achievements." Tania appeared for two weeks and made her most recent appearance on 28 May 2012.

== Storylines ==
She was the youngest daughter of Yvonne (Alison Quigan) and Ian (Jeffrey Thomas) and after getting a job at the hospital, instantly had a spark with Vinnie Kruse (Pua Magasiva). Tania was shocked to learn she had a brother, Hamish Flynn (Phil Brown) who arrived to work for the hospital. However he later turned out to be a conman. Tania began to date Mark Weston (Tim Foley) but discovered he had cheated on her and moved on to Anthony Richards (Michael Morris). Ant supplied her with prescription drugs and she briefly became addicted before he fled Ferndale. Tania reconciled with Mark and they married but, Maia's desperation to be a mother, led her to plead with Mark to donate sperm, Tania at first allowed him but after the attempt failed, refused a second attempt. However Mark went behind Tania's back and impregnated Maia. The secret was so overwhelming, Mark was driven to cheat on Tania. Maia and Jay reconciled but after Jay told Yvonne about Mark, Maia decided she could never trust her and the two parted forever, only for Jay to be murdered by the Ferndale Strangler. Tania's marriage broke up following the reveal of the truth and she found herself despising Maia, only forgiving her when she gave birth to Jay "JJ" Jeffries (Jack and Tom Boyle) in the back of her car. Mark and Tania divorced.

Tania became friends with Joey Henderson during the 'Ferndale Strangler' storyline and became dangerously close to becoming one of his victims after she told Alice Piper that he was just a 'boy' and she wasn't interested in dating him. When Joey overheard this, he was revealed to be the Ferndale Strangler with him preparing to strangle Tania with IV tubing inside her apartment. When Tania cut her finger with a knife, Joey panicked and put the IV line away, with her narrowly avoiding death without even knowing it. After this he stalked her in a shopping mall and hoped to kidnap her by offering her a lift but Yvonne picked her up and took her up north for Christmas. Joey missed his chance, and once again Tania avoided death unknowingly. Tania dated both Kip Denton (Will Hall) and Hone Ropata (Temuera Morrison) before she began an abusive relationship with gang member Kingi Te Wake (Te Kohe Tuhaka). Kingi left her and Tania dated Ben Goodall (Shaun Edwards-Brown), only to lose him to her mother. Ben was assaulted by a small gang of hoodlums and later it was discovered he had a brain hemorrhage. He fell brain dead and after several arguments between Yvonne and his sister Anita (Lara Fischel-Chisholm) as to whether he would come back alive or not, his life support was turned off a week later. Tania was very upset over his death and she and Yvonne reunited. She rebounded with Isaac Worthington (Matt Minto) but left him when he cheated on her. She fell in love with Rafe Durville (Simon London) and left the country with him to Australia to start a clinic. She returned briefly in for Yvonne's birthday.

== Reception ==
Tania received an overall positive reception. Tania and Maia's major storyline throughout 2007, Maia's baby with Mark, was a popular storyline, winning runner up for "Favourite Storyline" in the 2007 awards.
