= Sally Martin =

New Zealand actress (born 1985)

- Born: Sally Erana Martin; 14 May 1985 (age 41); Wellington, New Zealand
- Occupation: Television actress
- Years active: 1994–present
- Height: 5 ft 6¼ in (1.68m)

Sally Erana Martin (born May 14, 1985) is an actress from New Zealand. She has appeared in a range of television series, including The Strip, Shortland Street and in Power Rangers Ninja Storm as Tori Hanson, the latter two co-starring with Pua Magasiva.

Martin has also worked in several other shows such as Seven Periods with Mr Gormsby, The Killian Curse and in the TV movie Murder in Greenwich.

== Early life ==
Born in Wellington, Martin attended Chilton St. James School, where she performed in numerous festivals and productions including the national Sheilah Winn Shakespeare Festival, the New Zealand College Theatresports competition and a variety of school plays.

== Career ==
Martin started acting in 2001, at the age of 15, in The Strip as Gemma. In 2002, she appeared in Revelations as Annie, followed by Power Rangers Ninja Storm as Tori Hanson, the first female Blue Ranger, in 2003. After that, Martin filmed the movie Murder in Greenwich. In 2006, Martin acquired the part of Tory in Wendy Wu: Homecoming Warrior. In 2007, she appeared in Welcome to Paradise as Sasha in 2007 and since 2009 she has played Nurse Nicole Miller in Shortland Street. On September 23, 2019, she celebrated 10 years with the show. In 2015, she created a video for the #MyBodyMyTerms campaign.

In 2024, her character was written off Shortland Street.

== Filmography ==
Television and film roles
Year	Title	Role	Notes
2001	The Strip	Gemma	TV series
2001	Atlantis High	Dana	TV series, 1 episode
2002	Revelations	Annie	TV series
2002	Murder in Greenwich	Charity Foster	TV movie
2003	Power Rangers Ninja Storm	Tori Hanson/Blue Wind Ranger	TV series, main role
2004	Power Rangers Dino Thunder	Tori Hanson/Blue Wind Ranger	TV series, episodes: "Thunder Storm" (pt. 1 & 2)
2005	The Killian Curse	Katrina	TV series
2005	Seven Periods with Mr Gormsby	Sophie	TV series
2006	The Last Great Snail Chase	Josie Wales	Film
2006	Wendy Wu: Homecoming Warrior	Tori	TV movie
2007	Welcome to Paradise	Sasha	TV series
2007	Power Rangers Operation Overdrive	Tori Hanson/Blue Wind Ranger	TV series, episodes: "Once a Ranger" (pt. 1 & 2)
2007	My Story	Trish	TV, download
2009–2025	Shortland Street	Nicole Miller	TV series, main role

Video games

- 2003- Power Rangers Ninja Storm (voice) ... as Blue Wind Ranger
