= Alice Piper =

American activist (1908–1985)

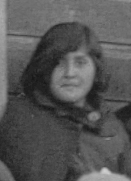
- Alice Piper, (~age 15) standing in front of the Paiute Community Center, c. early 1920s
- Born: September 7, 1908
- Died: August 22, 1985 (aged 76)
- Citizenship: Paiute
- Known for: Early US civil rights hero

Alice Piper (June 7, 1908 – August 22, 1985) was a Paiute (Nüümü) woman, who as a girl residing in Big Pine, California petitioned to attend the newly built Big Pine High School in 1923 and was denied entry due to her race. At that time, California educational law prohibited Native American children from attending a public school if a separate government run Indian school was established within three miles of the public school.

Alice Piper along with six other Indian children sued the district for the right to attend. Piper sued on the grounds that her 14th Amendment rights had been violated knowing full well that she was not receiving the same education that the newly built public school afforded. The local Indian day school only offered education up to the 5th grade level, was underfunded, and lacked many basic resources. Furthermore, the District trustees had previously agreed to allow Indian students to attend the school if their parents voted for a measure that would fund the construction of the school. Although the measure passed, the board of trustees did not honor their agreement.

As a local resident recalled, "It was an exciting morning when the request was made, all the mothers and fathers of children of school age, Indian and white, were on the street to hear the answer of the district trustees. When the request was denied, the Indians immediately took court action pressing their case in the name of Alice Piper, a beautiful, intelligent, Indian girl." The California Supreme Court unanimously ruled in her favor in the case Piper v. Big Pine (1924), thus opening the door for herself and other Native American children to attend public schools in the state of California.

== Legacy ==
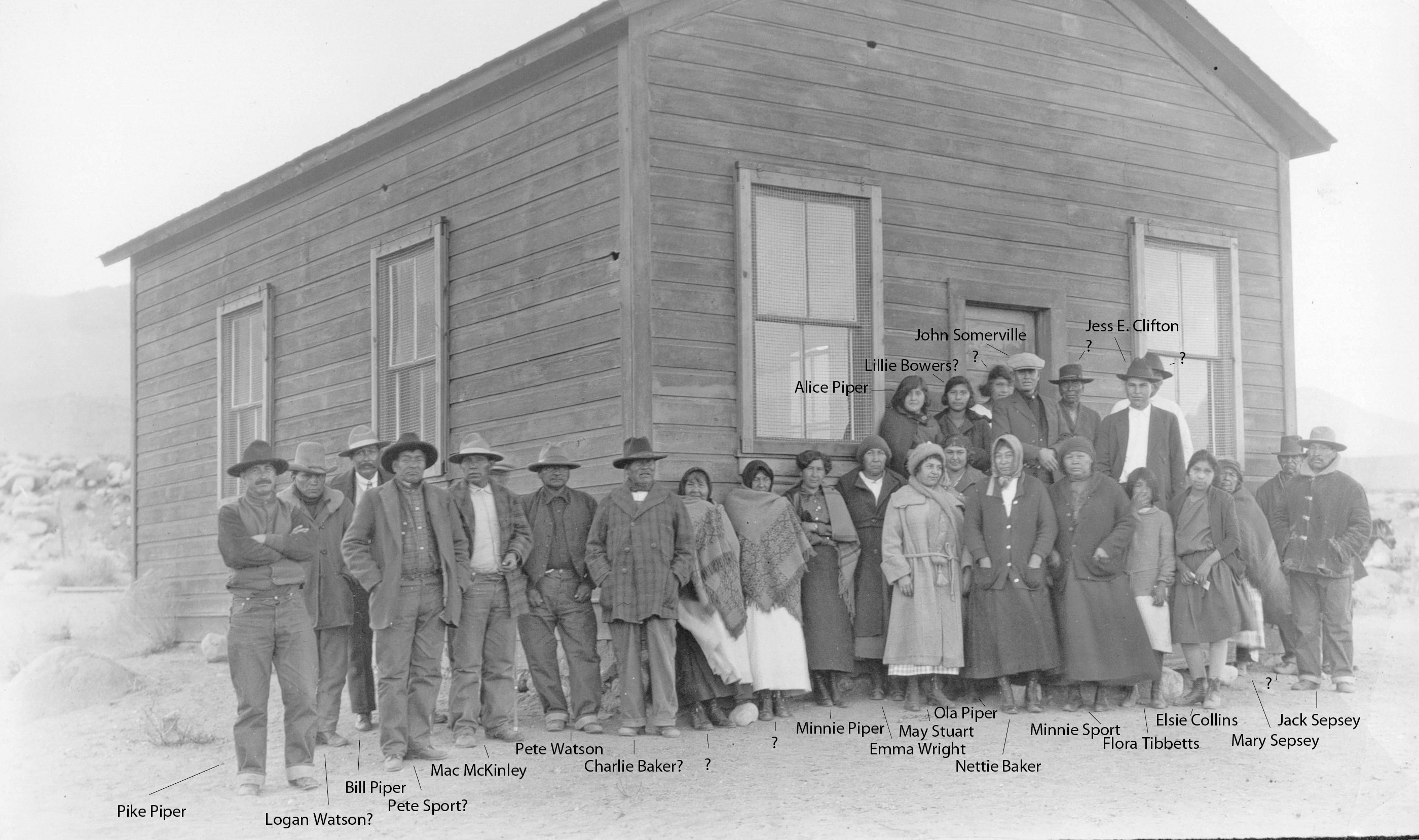
Big Pine Indian Camp Community Center

Piper's court victory became a turning point in the struggle for Native American education and ended the practice of sending Indian children who qualified for public school to separate government-run Indian day schools. Piper v. Big Pine was cited as a precedent in the landmark case Mendez v. Westminster in 1947 which declared the segregation of Mexican-American students in California public schools unconstitutional. The ruling prompted California Governor Earl Warren to sign legislation in 1947 that repealed the state's remaining segregationist education codes, desegregating schools across the state. Mendez v. Westminster was subsequently cited in legal materials related to Brown v. Board of Education (1954), which desegregated public schools nationwide.

Alice Piper stands as an early civil rights hero who championed equal educational opportunities for Native Americans, opening the door for equal access to education for all children regardless of race. Says Ada Wardle Robinson, the Inyo County Superintendent who held the office years after the Piper case decision had been handed down, "And as each year as both eighth grade and high school students graduate, we are reminded that the development of our youthful citizens is not confined to the white race and we are thankful to those Indians who years ago insisted that their children be given an equal chance."

In 2009, the Big Pine Paiute Tribe and Big Pine Unified School District agreed to commemorate Piper's victory with a statue placed in front of the school in her honor. The statue was dedicated on June 2, 2014, on the 90th anniversary of Alice Piper's victory in front of the school steps on the same ground in which the board of trustees had denied Alice Piper the right to attend in 1923. This date also marks the day in 1924 that president Calvin Coolidge signed the Indian Citizenship Act, which declared all Indians, regardless of membership in a tribe, citizens of the United States.

As of 2014, 56% of the students who attend Big Pine high school are Native American.
