= Anna Jullienne =

New Zealand actress (b. 1982)

Anna Jullienne Kermode
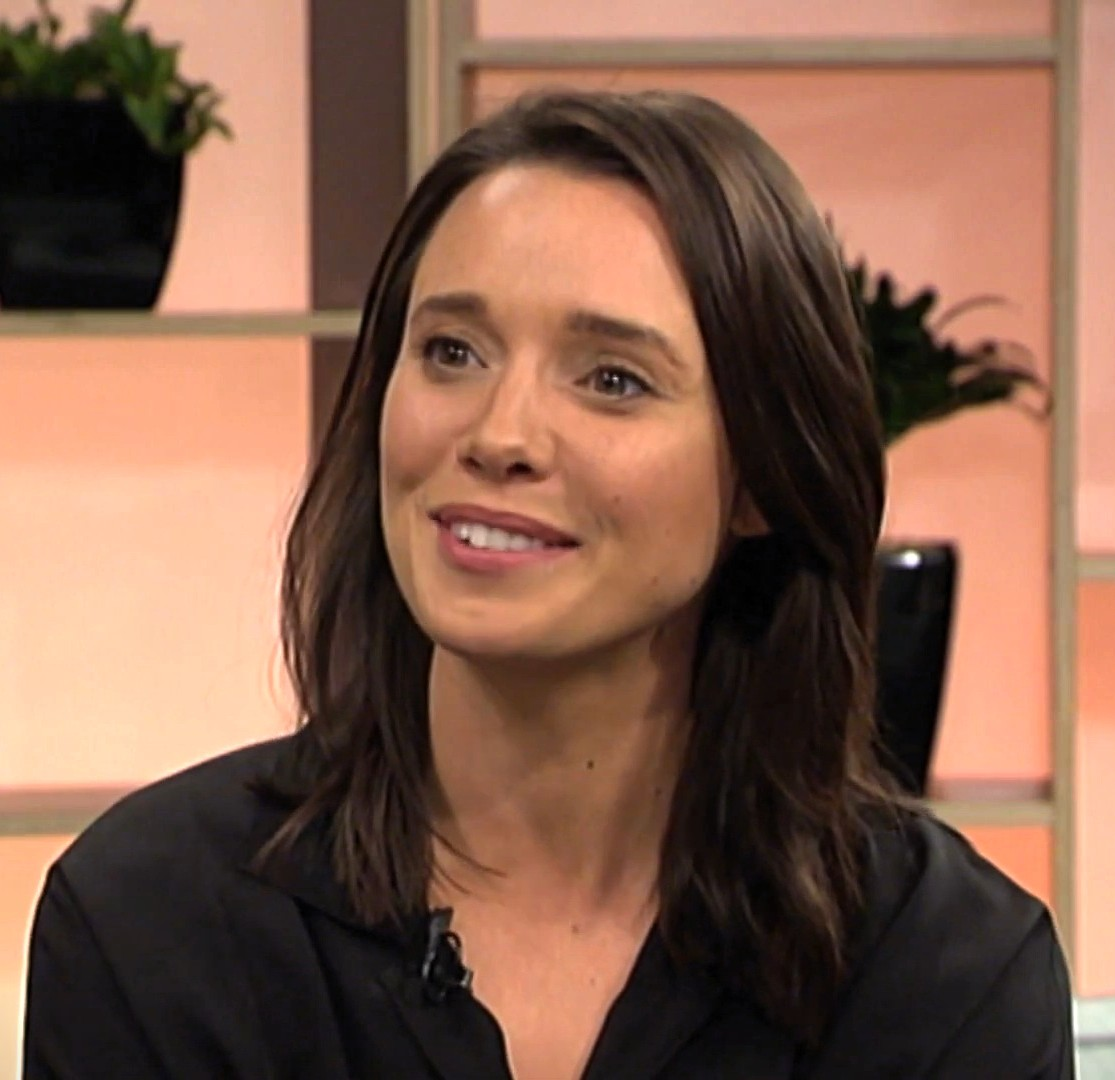
- Jullienne in 2018
- Born: 7 November 1982 (age 43); New Zealand
- Notable work: Nurse Maia Jeffries in Shortland Street
- Spouse: James Kermode (m. 2010)

Anna Jullienne Kermode (born 7 November 1982) is a New Zealand actress, best known for her role as Nurse Maia Jeffries in the television series Shortland Street (2004-2012).

== Career ==
Jullienne attended Corran School for Girls, and was active in drama, with lead roles in productions of Amadeus, Julius Caesar and Anything Goes, and she won several awards, including the 1999 NZ Young Performer of the Year, 1st prize in the 1999 Auckland National Independent Schools Speech Competition, and 1st prize in the Auckland Drama Championship at the North Shore Performing Arts Festival. In 2007, she won the Air New Zealand Screen Award for Performance by a Supporting Actress, for her role on Shortland Street.

Jullienne holds an ATCL Teacher Practical Certificate from the Trinity College of London Drama Examination, and studied camera technique under Jan Saussey. She is fluent in French and Japanese, as well as English.

Her professional career started during her time at the University of Auckland with roles in Mercy Peak and Secret Agent Men, and she put her studies (a BA in English and Film and TV) on hold to take up her first major dramatic screen role on Shortland Street. She took a six-month break from filming Shortland Street from October 2007 and left the show in late 2010 with Maia's last scene airing 9 February 2011. Throughout her career Jullienne has been a prominent spokeswoman and model for the Red 11 modelling agency. Jullienne has appeared in photo shoots for such brands as: NZ Performance Car, Red Bull, XCDR and Car50.

== Personal life ==
In real life, Anna has close friendships with Fleur Saville, Faye Smythe, Beth Allen, Amanda Billing, Te Kohe Tuhaka and Alison Quigan. She married commercial property manager James Kermode in 2010. She had her first child, a son (Theodore), in January 2014, her second son (Jude) in November 2016, and a daughter (Nina) in June 2021.

== Filmography ==
Film and television
Year	Title	Role	Notes
2004–2012	Shortland Street	Maia Jeffries	Main cast (2004–2011), guest (2012, 3 episodes)
2011	Underbelly NZ: Land of the Long Green Cloud	Deb Masters	2 episodes, miniseries
2012	Sione's 2: Unfinished Business	Librarian	Feature film
2012	Auckland Daze	Anna	1 episode
2013	The Blue Rose	Krystle Wilkinson	Recurring role
2013	Harry	Jenny Chisholm	Episodes: "He's the Weak Link", "Play with Fire"
2013	Over the Moon	Connie Radar	Short film
2013–2014	Jono and Ben at Ten	Herself	Recurring role
2014	Agent Anna	Unnamed	1 episode
2015–2018	800 Words	Katie	Main Cast
2016	Bombshell	Frederique	TV movie
2019	Falling Inn Love	Charlotte Wadsworth	TV movie
2019	Prickly Jam	Cricket Madeline	Short film
2019–present	Mean Mums	Heather	Main cast
2020	Head High	Christine	1 episode
2021, 2023	Sweet Tooth	Beverly Anderson	Episodes: "Sorry About All the Dead People", "The Ballad of the Last Men"
2022	My Life Is Murder	Adele	Episode: "Nothing Concrete"
2024	The Brokenwood Mysteries	Amelia French	Episode: "Day of the Dead"
