= Faye Smythe =

New Zealand actress

- Born: Faye Smythe; 25 November 1985 (age 40); Cape Town, South Africa
- Occupation: Actress

Faye Smythe (born 25 November 1985) is a New Zealand television actor, best known for her role in Shortland Street as Nurse Tania Jeffries.

== Early life ==
Smythe is of mixed race ancestry and was born in Cape Town. She emigrated to New Zealand with her family at the age of eleven. Smythe finished high school and started work on a communications degree, but left college to train as a fitness instructor. She was still pursuing acting, but after auditioning unsuccessfully for a number of parts, including Shortland Street character Tania Jeffries, Smythe decided to put her acting ambitions on hold for a year and re-enrolled for university. When she got a callback for Tania, she wasn't sure she even wanted the part - but she did the audition, and was asked to join the Shortland Street cast. Smythe also was on Legend of the Seeker as Sister Merissa.

== Shortland Street ==
Smythe first auditioned for Shortland Street for the part of Tama Hudson's sister, Mihi. She did not get the part, but made an impact on the producers. She was asked to audition for Shannon before being offered the six-week role of Tama's cat-burgling friend Kat.

== Filmography ==
Film and television
Year	Title	Role	Notes
2005-2010, 2012	Shortland Street	Tania Jeffries	TV series
2010	Legend of the Seeker	Sister Merissa	"Princess", "Bound"
2011	Love Birds	Susan	
2012	Auckland Daze	Fay	"1.3"
2013	House Husbands	Dr. Buxton	"2.10"
2017	West of Sunshine	Karen	Film
2018	Click	Mother	Short Film
2019	Bad Mothers	Faith	TV Series (3 episodes)
2019	Help the Series	Annie	TV Mini Series
2020	Darker, Darkest	The Woman	Short Film
