= List of Shortland Street characters introduced in 2004 =

The following is a list of characters that first appeared in the New Zealand soap opera Shortland Street in 2004, by order of first appearance.

== Sef Kruse ==
Sef Kruse
- Shortland Street character
- Portrayed by: Tuki Laumea
- Duration: 2004–05
- First appearance: 23 April 2004
- Last appearance: 29 March 2005
- Introduced by: Harriet Crampton
In-universe information
- Occupation: Temp worker
- Uncles: Talafao Kruse
- First cousins: Vinnie Kruse-Miller; Tamasi'i Kruse; Talia Kruse

Sef Kruse was Vinnie's (Pua Magasiva) womanizing cousin. Sef briefly visited Vinnie in early 2004 before he was hired late in the year as a temporary replacement for Waverley Wilson (Claire Chitham) on reception whilst she was on maternity leave. Sef was often seen accompanying Vinnie on nights out in the town and the two would often try to pull women with disastrous consequences. Sef was last seen in March 2005 when he and Vinnie tried to attract Tania Jeffries (Faye Smythe).

== Scarlett Valentine ==
Scarlett Valentine
- Shortland Street character
- Portrayed by: Nicole Thomson
- Duration: 2004–2008
- First appearance: 30 April 2004
- Last appearance: 2008
In-universe information
- Occupation: Student
- Father: Craig Valentine
- Mother: Paula Valentine
- Brothers: Jake Valentine

Scarlett Valentine was portrayed by Nicole Thomson and appeared as a regular character for 3 years, returning in a guest role in 2008.

A student at Ferndale High and daughter of Shortland Street Hospital doctor Craig (Renato Bartolomei), Scarlett was more interested in cricket and books than make-up and boys like the other students at her school. She was terribly bullied by the other girls including Tash Heremaia (Michelle Stewart), not helped by her teenage rebel brother Jake (Callum Gittins). The arrival of Scarlett's mother Paula (Vivien Bell) to Ferndale raised doubt as to whether Craig or his brother Brett (Colin Moy) were her true father - potentially passing on the gene for Hypertrophic cardiomyopathy. A DNA test proved Craig was her father, tightening their bond.

Scarlett soon found romance with Tama's (David Wikaira-Paul) cousin Eti Kawaka (Isaac Bell) and despite a brief breakup following a car crash, the two enjoyed a teenage romance. However Eti departed to Japan, and Scarlett clashed with her father's partner Sarah Potts (Amanda Billing). She provided trouble for Craig when she made advances on his colleague TK Samuels (Benjamin Mitchell), breaking into his house. Later she had a Summer romance with new boy Hunter McKay (Lee Donoghue) but this turned sour in the school year when Hunter and sister Sophie (Kimberley Crossman) started bullying her. Driven to the edge, Scarlett stole Craig's car and drove at speed into Hunter. Arrested and awaiting trial, Scarlett departed to Australia to stay with her mother and brother. Scarlett returned in 2008 for her trial and after the extent of the bullying was unveiled, she was discharged and returned to Australia. Later in the year Chris Warner (Michael Galvin) informed her of Craig's murder.

== Jim Matheson ==
Jim Matheson
- Shortland Street character
- Portrayed by: Nick Blake
- Duration: 2004
- First appearance: 2004
- Last appearance: October 2004
- Introduced by: Harriet Crampton
In-universe information
- Occupation: Caterer

Jim Matheson was hired partway through 2004 by Tama Hudson (David Wikaira-Paul) and his girlfriend Shannon Te Ngaru (Amber Curreen) to help out at the hospital cafeteria. In his spare time, Jim was an inventor, inventing odd knick-knacks, hoping to get them picked up to make a living. Upon his arrival to Shortland Street, Jim forged friendships with Sticky (Ian Hughes) and Barb Heywood (Annie Whittle). However, Jim's darker side became apparent after being turned down for funding for his inventions. Coming home one night drunk and angry, Jim would rape Barb in her apartment. After being thrown out, it wasn't long before Barb revealed her rape to friend Judy Brownlee (Donogh Rees) along with Sticky who would convince her to report Jim to the police. After getting into a fistfight with the usually timid and docile Sticky, Shannon would change her opinion after initially defending Jim and suspended Jim from his job. Not long after attempting to intimidate Shannon and being interrupted by Vinnie Kruse (Pua Magasiva), Jim would be arrested and eventually plead guilty to rape. He would never be seen again.

== Siobhan O'Leary ==
Siobhan O'Leary
- Shortland Street character
- Portrayed by: Siobhan Marshall
- Duration: 2004
- First appearance: 13 May 2004
- Last appearance: 23 June 2004
- Introduced by: Harriet Crampton
In-universe information
- Occupation: Nanny

Siobhan O'Leary arrived in mid-2004 as the new nanny for Harry (Callum Campbell-Ross), hired by his father Chris Warner (Michael Galvin). Chris was uneasy about Siobhan's attractiveness and she initially clashed with Harry's mother, Toni (Laura Hill). The two soon became friends and it was not long before Chris and Siobhan began sleeping with each other. However Chris fell in love with Lucy Swinton (Sally Stockwell) and ended up dumping her. The following day Chris discovered a note from Siobhan, stating she had fled Ferndale.

Siobhan Marshall auditioned for the role shortly after graduating and thought the fact that the character shared her name was destiny. She won the role and retained it for several weeks, however she struggled with the recognition on the streets, including an incident where the character was a called a "slut".

== Craig Valentine ==
Craig Valentine is the old school friend of Chris Warner (Michael Galvin). He quickly became the head of ED at the hospital and clashed with many due to his fiery and, at times, moody personality. He was portrayed Renato Bartolomei until 2008.

== Tina-Anne Harrison ==
Tina-Anne Harrison
- Shortland Street character
- Portrayed by: Libby Reber
- Duration: 2004–05
- First appearance: 23 June 2004
- Last appearance: 17 March 2005
- Introduced by: Harriet Crampton
In-universe information
- Father: Nick Harrison
- Mother: Waverley Harrison
- Brothers: Ranger Harrison
- Sisters: Celica Harrison; Camry Harrison
- Half-brothers: Lucas Harrison
- Grandfathers: Barry Harrison; John Wilson
- Grandmothers: Jenny Harrison
- Uncles: Stratford Wilson
- Aunts: Amberley Wilson

Tina-Anne Trinity Harrison was the daughter of Nick (Karl Burnett) and Waverley Harrison (Claire Chitham), who was born on the shows 3000th episode. Nick nearly missed her birth but arrived just in time. She was named after Anne Kahu (Emmeline Hawthorne), whilst Judy Brownlee (Donogh Rees) was named as her godmother and Sticky (Ian Hughes) and Eltham Wilson (Kip Chapman) her godfathers. Eltham saved Tina-Anne and her brother Lucas (William Tregidga) from a fire at their home in 2004. She departed alongside her family in March 2005. In 2022 Waverley and Lucas (Loki Smythe) mentioned Tina-Anne as having started Lincoln University.

== Jay Copeland ==
Jessica "Jay" Copeland was the estranged daughter of Victor Kahu (Calvin Tuteao). She arrived in mid-2004 with her traveling partner – Maia Jeffries (Anna Jullienne). However it soon became obvious the two were really lovers. Jay was portrayed by Jaime Passier-Armstrong until 2007.

== Maia Jeffries ==
Maia Anne Jeffries was the lesbian girlfriend of Jay Copeland (Jaime Passier-Armstrong). However Maia soon outlasted Jay and became an iconic character on the show, being involved in several high profile stories including the 2009 storyline where Maia confessed to having killed a man. She was portrayed by Anna Jullienne until 2011 and again in May 2012.

== Eltham Wilson ==
Eltham Wilson
- Shortland Street character
- Portrayed by: Kip Chapman
- Duration: 2004
- First appearance: 2 August 2004
- Last appearance: 12 November 2004
- Introduced by: Harriet Crampton
In-universe information
- Mother: Sharon Wilson
- Uncles: John Wilson
- Aunts: Trish Wilson
- First cousins: Stratford Wilson; Waverley Harrison; Amberley Wilson

Eltham Wilson was the badboy cousin of Waverley Harrison (Claire Chitham). He arrived in August 2004 when Waverley named him as the godmother to her daughter Tina-Anne (Libby Reber). He instantly got on the bad side of Waverley's husband Nick Harrison (Karl Burnett) and Maia Jeffries (Anna Jullienne). He soon fell head over heels in love with Maia but discovered she was a lesbian. Eltham began to work at the bar but Nick was horrified to discover that Eltham was dealing drugs from behind the counter. He also accidentally set the bar alight but was hailed a hero when he rescued Waverley and Nick's children – Lucas (William Tregidga) and Tina-Anne, from the blaze. In November he accepted a job offer in Taranaki and departed after a kiss from Maia.

== Malcolm Grieg ==
Malcolm Grieg
- Shortland Street character
- Portrayed by: Norman Forsey
- Duration: 2004
- First appearance: 24 August 2004
- Last appearance: 25 August 2004
- Introduced by: Harriet Crampton
In-universe information
- Occupation: Chief Executive Officer of Shortland Street Hospital (2004)

Malcolm Grieg made a guest appearance over 2 episodes in August 2004. The DHB made the controversial decision to hire the elderly Malcolm as the new CEO after Chris Warner was relieved of his position of CEO following the DHB becoming aware of his knowledge of the euthanasia Dr Geoff Greenlaw carried out on a patient. However Malcolm proved hugely ill prepared for the job and much of the staff believed he had died 3 years beforehand. Malcolm collapsed at his desk due to respiratory failure and after narrowly surviving, did not return to his role.

== Andrew Solomon ==
Andrew Solomon
- Shortland Street character
- Portrayed by: Paolo Rotondo
- Duration: 2004–05
- First appearance: 27 August 2004
- Last appearance: 14 October 2005
- Introduced by: Harriet Crampton
In-universe information
- Occupation: Chief Executive Officer of Shortland Street Hospital (2004–05)
- Sisters: Claire Solomon
- Wife: Sarah Potts (2005–07)Robyn Stokes (2007-)
- Sons: Caleb Stokes; Unnamed son Unnamed son
- Stepsons: Daniel Potts

Dr. Andrew Solomon made his first appearance in mid-2004 as the new CEO of the hospital. Andrew's no nonsense attitude caused him to clash with the staff but many saw his lighter side when he began to date Sarah Potts (Amanda Billing) and when his teenage sister Claire (Emily Robins) arrived. A roadblock appeared in the return of Andrew's ex lover Robyn Stokes (Kirstie O'Sullivan) who orchestrated a hit and run to win Andrew back, nearly killing him in the process. She revealed they had an illegitimate son who had died and used Andrew's confused state to sleep with him. Andrew and Sarah wed but Robyn returned and revealed she was pregnant with twins. Sarah and Andrew broke up and he eventually moved to England with Robyn and got a job as a doctor in the countryside. Claire informed Sarah on 21 March 2006 that the babies had been born. In 2007 Chris Warner (Michael Galvin) rang him to inform him of Claire's murder.

Rotondo was openly critical of the character and the show itself, labelling Andrew as the "most boring character in Shortland Street."

== Talafao Kruse ==
Talafao Kruse
- Shortland Street character
- Portrayed by: Joseph Pilitati
- Duration: 2004
- First appearance: 7 September 2004
- Last appearance: 10 September 2004
- Introduced by: Harriet Crampton
In-universe information
- Sons: Tamasi'i Kruse
- Daughters: Talia Kruse
- Nephews: Vinnie Kruse; Sef Kruse

Talafao Kruse was the staunch businessman uncle of Vinnie Kruse (Pua Magasiva). He arrived with his daughter Talia (Marlia Rogers) in September and was unimpressed by Vinnie's girlfriend Shannon (Amber Curreen).

== Talia Kruse ==
Talia Kruse
- Shortland Street character
- Portrayed by: Marlina Rogers
- Duration: 2004
- First appearance: 7 September 2004
- Last appearance: 30 September 2004
- Introduced by: Harriet Crampton
In-universe information
- Father: Talafao Kruse
- Brothers: Tamasi'i Kruse
- First cousins: Vinnie Kruse; Sef Kruse

Talia Kruse was the cousin of Vinnie (Pua Magasiva) who visited Ferndale alongside her father Talafao Kruse (Joseph Pilitati) and was unimpressed by Vinnie's girlfriend Shannon (Amber Curreen). Talia decided to stay longer in Ferndale and started to date Tama Hudson (David Wikaira-Paul). However the two broke up and Talia returned to Samoa.

== Sarah Potts ==
Dr. Sarah Marjorie Potts was the potential love interest of Craig Valentine (Renato Bartolomei) who it soon revealed had an illegitimate son – Daniel Potts (Jarred Blakiston), who was raised as her brother. She was portrayed by Amanda Billing and has gone down as an iconic character with her multiple sclerosis storyline seeing praise.

== Mark Weston ==
Mark Weston
- Shortland Street character
- Portrayed by: Tim Foley
- Duration: 2004–07
- First appearance: 28 September 2004
- Last appearance: 29 August 2007
- Introduced by: Harriet Crampton
In-universe information
- Occupation: Doctor
- Father: Dave Weston
- Mother: Julia Weston
- Stepmother: Candice Weston
- Wife: Tania Jeffries (2007); Amy (2007–)
- Sons: Jay "JJ" Jeffries unnamed child

Dr. Mark Weston first appeared in an episode set in Fiji. He worked in a clinic there when Chris Warner (Michael Galvin) and Toni McAllister (Laura Hill) visited but it was not long before he landed a job at Shortland Street. He was instantly attracted to Maia Jeffries (Anna Jullienne) and saved her life when his psychopathic friend Hugo Carmont (Fraser Brown) tried to kill her in exchange for Mark's romance. Mark began to date Maia's sister Tania (Faye Smythe) but he cheated on her with school girl Claire Solomon (Emily Robins) which ended the relationship. Mark had a near romance with Toni but reconciled with Tania but when he discovered an addiction to sex when online dating, Tania forced him to seek help. The two married in 2007 but Mark's love for Maia took over and he donated sperm to her behind Tania's back. Mark also landed himself as a lead suspect in several murders that took place. The stress got to him and he cheated on Tania with Meg Harris (Emily Mowbray) at his birthday party before he confessed the truth about his and Maia's child to the Jeffries family. Isolated and wifeless, Mark departed Ferndale for Australia. With the marriage annulled it was later revealed Mark had remarried and had a child.

== Morgan Potts ==
Morgan Potts
- Shortland Street character
- Portrayed by: Michael Morrissey
- Duration: 2004–05, 2007
- First appearance: 29 September 2004
- Last appearance: 22 March 2007
- Introduced by: Harriet Crampton (2004, 2005); Jason Daniel (2007)
In-universe information
- Sisters: Gwen Potts
- Wife: Pam Potts (1967–)
- Daughters: Sarah Potts
- Grandsons: Daniel Potts
- Granddaughters: Tillie Potts

Morgan Potts was the father of Sarah Potts (Amanda Billing). He and his wife Pam (Teresa Woodham) had raised Sarah's illegitimate son Daniel (Jarred Blakiston) as their own and arrived in 2004 to let him visit Sarah. The truth soon came out however and Daniel went to live with Sarah. In 2005 Morgan and Pam attended Sarah's wedding to Andrew Solomon (Paolo Rotondo). The couple returned in 2007 when they met Sarah's new fiance TK Samuels (Benjamin Mitchell). The couple left at odds with TK when Morgan continuously forgot his name. In 2011 Sarah announced that her parents were living in the Bay of Islands and would not be visiting for the birth of her daughter. In 2012 the couple talked to Daniel (Ido Drent) and Sarah on Skype. Morgan and Pam returned to Ferndale offscreen in 2014 to attend Sarah's funeral. The couple managed to convince TK to have Sarah's ceremony in a conventional church rather than the Samuels home marae.

== Daniel Potts ==
Daniel Joshua Potts was the illegitimate child of Sarah Potts (Amanda Billing). He was raised as her brother but when he discovered the truth, came to resent Sarah. He was portrayed by Jarred Blakiston in recurring stints until 2005 and again in 2007. The role was recast in 2009 with Ido Drent taking on the character in a regular role.

== Pam Potts ==
Pam Potts
- Shortland Street character
- Portrayed by: Teresa Woodham
- Duration: 2004, 2005, 2007
- First appearance: 29 September 2004
- Last appearance: 22 March 2007
- Introduced by: Harriet Crampton (2004, 2005); Jason Daniel (2007)
In-universe information
- Husband: Morgan Potts (1967–)
- Daughters: Sarah Potts
- Grandsons: Daniel Potts
- Granddaughters: Tillie Potts

Pam Potts was the controlling mother of Sarah Potts (Amanda Billing). She and her husband Morgan (Michael Morrissey) dropped Sarah's son Daniel (Jarred Blakiston) to Sarah's. Pam was disgusted when Sarah planned to reveal she was his mother and not his sister. Pam tried to keep Daniel but he insisted on being taken in by Sarah. In 2005 Pam returned with Morgan for Sarah's wedding to Andrew (Paolo Rotondo) and expressed joy at the coupling. However, in 2007 when Pam met Sarah's new fiance TK Samuels (Benjamin Mitchell), she was constantly at odds at him when Sarah rebuffed her confrontational behaviour. In 2011 Sarah announced that her parents were living in the Bay of Islands and would not be visiting for the birth of her daughter. Pam suggested the name of Matilda which was eventually chosen. In 2012 the couple talked to Daniel (Ido Drent) and Sarah on Skype. Morgan and Pam returned to Ferndale offscreen in 2014 to attend Sarah's funeral. The couple managed to convince TK to have Sarah's ceremony in a conventional church rather than the Samuels home marae.

== Yvonne Jeffries ==
Yvonne Jeffries (née Gregory) was the interfering mother of Maia Jeffries (Anna Jullienne). The character arrived in a guest role in 2004, before becoming the hospital receptionist in 2005. She participated in numerous high profile storylines, the most prominent of which was her relationship with daughter Tania's (Faye Smythe) ex-boyfriend – Ben Goodall (Shaun Edwards-Brown). She was portrayed by Alison Quigan until 2011 and again in May 2012.

== Ian Jeffries ==
Ian Jeffries
- Shortland Street character
- Portrayed by: Jeffrey Thomas
- Duration: 2004, 2005–06
- First appearance: 18 November 2004
- Last appearance: 28 February 2006
- Introduced by: Harriet Crampton (2004, 2005)
In-universe information
- Occupation: Farmer
- Wife: Yvonne Gregory (1976–2006)
- Sons: Hamish Flynn
- Daughters: Maia Jeffries; Libby Jeffries; Tania Jeffries
- Grandsons: Peter Flynn; Jay Jeffries
- Granddaughters: Amber Flynn

Ian Jeffries was the husband of Yvonne (Alison Quigan). The two arrived in November 2004 and an increasingly frail Ian was diagnosed with motor neuron disease. The couple returned the following year and Ian was re-diagnosed with Kennedy's disease. Ian was a lot more accepting of daughter Maia (Anna Jullienne), when she revealed she was gay than Yvonne and he grew to appreciate Maia's girlfriend Jay (Jaime Prassier-Armstrong). Ian was sent away to rehab but when he returned Yvonne suspected he was cheating. After Maia's wedding he confessed his love and that he would never cheat and the two reconciled. Days later Yvonne found Ian's body off the side of a cliff, he had killed himself due to his deteriorating illness.

== Claire Solomon ==
Claire Solomon
- Shortland Street character
- Portrayed by: Emily Robins
- Duration: 2004–07
- First appearance: 25 December 2004
- Last appearance: 23 July 2007
- Introduced by: Harriet Crampton
In-universe information
- Occupation: Receptionist at Shortland Street hospital (2005–07)
- Brothers: Andrew Solomon
- Nephews: Caleb Stokes

Claire Simone Solomon made her first appearance on Christmas Day 2004. Claire was the troublesome teenage sister of hospital CEO, Andrew Solomon (Paolo Rotondo) who quickly became a fan favourite. Claire arrived unexpectedly back into Andrew's life in late 2004 after spending 8 years in the United Kingdom. Scandalously, she began dating an older man Maestro (Gregory Paintin) but this was brief and she caused Andrew grief when she over-dosed on stolen morphine. A flirtation with Jake Valentine (Calum Gittins) eventually led to romance but when she accidentally ran someone over in her car she was arrested and sentenced to 100 hours of community service. Claire left Jake for an affair with much older doctor Mark Weston (Tim Foley), leading to much of the hospital staff rallying against her. Claire found a new lease for life in dating religious fanatic Baxter Cormack (Tom Hern). The two became engaged but he ended up dumping her in order to follow the path of becoming a faith healer. Claire caused trouble with her friend Libby Jeffries (Fleur Saville) when she had an affair with her boyfriend Kieran Mitchell (Adam Rickitt). This was short-lived and she had a brief flirtation with new nurse Joey Henderson (Johnny Barker). In July 2007, Claire's naked body was found in a hospital dumpster and it was clear she had been murdered in what soon turned out to be a Serial Killer. Kieran became the chief suspect, even having nightmares of killing Claire, fearing he had killed her and forgotten it. In December it was revealed she, alongside 4 other women, had been murdered by Joey Henderson.
