= Anne Kahu =

- Shortland Street character
- Portrayed by: Emmeline Hawthorne
- Duration: 2001–2004
- First appearance: 20 November 2001
- Last appearance: 26 January 2004
- Introduced by: Harriet Crampton
In-universe information
- Other names: Anne Brownlee; Anne Greenlaw
- Occupation: Nurse
- Father: Rex Treherne
- Mother: Judy Brownlee
- Adoptive father: Dave Greenlaw
- Adoptive mother: Liz Greenlaw
- Brothers: Geoff Greenlaw (adoptive); Patrick Greenlaw (adoptive)
- Sisters: Delphi Greenlaw (adoptive); Peta Greenlaw (adoptive)
- Husband: Victor Kahu (2002–2003)

Anne Kahu (also Brownlee and Greenlaw) is a fictional character on the New Zealand soap opera Shortland Street who was portrayed by Emmeline Hawthorne from late 2001 until early 2004. The character was killed off in the 2003 cliffhanger.

== Creation and casting ==
The soap went through a major revamp in 2000 with one of the intentions being a more community based cast with strong family ties. It was decided that the family of Judy Brownlee would be expanded to achieve this. The character of Anne was created to fulfill the role. Emmeline Hawthorne, whose mother, Elizabeth had previously starred prominently, was cast as the role. The character was killed off in the 2003 cliffhanger.

== Storylines ==
Anne arrived after getting a job as a nurse at Shortland Street, where her adoptive brother, Geoff (Andrew Laing), worked as a doctor. She grew attracted to older man, Victor Kahu (Calvin Tuteao), who was in a steady relationship. Anne decided to locate her adoptive mother and in the process of finding her identity, began dating a newly single Victor. However Anne slowly started to grow attracted to Victor's son, Nelson (Quinton Hita). Anne eventually discovered her boss Judy (Donogh Rees) was her biological mother and the eventually bonded. Anne and Victor got engaged and the two married in a beautiful Spring wedding. The two decided to adopt Tama (David Wikaira-Paul) and Shannon's (Amber Curreen) child, but it died shortly after birth and a devastated Anne began an affair with Nelson. Victor found out and the marriage was over and so too was the affair. Anne grew close to Rex Treherne (Raymond Hawthorne) only to discover he was her father. As the year ended, Anne attended the opening of one of Rex's new buildings, only to be caught in the wreckage when the building collapsed suddenly. She was crushed by a large piece of rubble and it was revealed she had died.

== Character development ==
=== Maternity ===
Upon the soap opera's revamp in 2000, part of the producers plan was to present a more community based setting with steady family links between characters. It was decided to introduce a daughter for Judy whom she had adopted out at birth, the character of Anne was created to serve this purpose. Upon her arrival Anne initially gets on the bad side of Judy with Hawthorne stating; "I come along very bright-eyed and bushy-tailed, with a whole lot of ideas about how the old people shouldn’t be on the sleeping pills... I make the mistake about the old people and take the signs off their backs and one of them goes wandering. So Judy Brownlee automatically thinks I’m useless and I have to do all the terrible jobs, like cleaning up the sluice room and emptying the linen skips and doing tea rounds.” The adopted Anne then set out on a "standard soap opera story" to find her biological mother. Both the characters and the audience were shocked when it was discovered Anne's mother was none other than the head of nursing, Judy Brownlee. Part of the reason for the pairing, was that with the tense situation between characters, any situation could potentially be explosive. Despite a shaky start, the two bonded well and Judy was devastated when Anne was killed.

=== Relationship with Victor and Nelson ===
In 2002 Anne and Victor Kahu embarked on a relationship. There was huge contrast between the middle aged head of hospital and the young nurse, but Tuteao praised the relationship saying; "Love knows no age, no colour... She sort of makes him want to be a better man. Or try to be." The two got engaged despite Anne developing feelings for Victor's son Nelson, who was the same age. Despite not acting on her feelings, Anne continued to grow attracted to Nelson as the wedding drew closer. The filming of the wedding meant three days of filming in cold conditions whilst onscreen it was to be a picturesque ceremony that was to be the soap's biggest wedding since Gina and Leonard's in 1993. Victor's actor, Calvin Tuteao, enjoyed the experience saying; "Had loads of extras, making heaps of noise out here, the place was rocking." The two married but after the vows Victor was arrested for murder after being framed by nemesis Kurt. However Anne did end up having an affair with Nelson and when Victor found out, he was infuriated and ended the relationship. When Anne was crushed by a collapsing building in the 2003 cliffhanger, Tuteao agreed that the two were too different, stating; "They're not really compatible, I suppose. They're totally different. Maybe he just wanted a younger woman, a trophy wife. But I think Victor would miss her, too, if she dies." When Anne died, despite having moved on to Donna, Victor was devastated and was forced to reevaluate his life.

== Reception ==
Anne's storyline with Judy has been named as one of the most iconic storylines on the soap. The scene where Hawthorne's character prepared to romance her real life father (Rex Treherne), has been described as one of Shortland Street's strangest sights.
