= Te Hana Hudson =

- Shortland Street character
- Portrayed by: Vanessa Rare
- Duration: 2001–2006
- First appearance: 5 April 2001
- Last appearance: 14 April 2006
- Created by: Jason Daniel
- Introduced by: Simon Bennett (2001); Harriet Crampton (2003, 2004); Jason Daniel (2006)
In-universe information
- Occupation: Nurse
- Father: Kahikatea Kahu
- Mother: Makana Kahu
- Brothers: Victor Kahu
- Sisters: Bernice Kahu
- Husband: Joe Hudson
- Sons: Tama Hudson
- Daughters: Mihi Hudson
- Grandsons: Te Ngakau Hudson
- Granddaughters: Rangimarie Hudson
- Grandfathers: Kahakatane Kahu
- Uncles: Arthur Kahu
- Aunts: Liz Kahu
- Nephews: Nelson Copeland; Whetu Hudson; Eti Kawaka
- Nieces: Jay Copeland

Te Hana Hudson (previously Kahu) is a fictional character on the New Zealand soap opera Shortland Street who was portrayed by Vanessa Rare for three stints between 2001 and 2006. The matriarch of the Hudson family unit, Te Hana was introduced during an infamous revamp of the show and was a representation of the working class New Zealander.

== Creation and casting ==
In 2000 an Australian consultant made several large changes to the show that would see a more working class hospital portrayed. Te Hana, her husband Joe and children Mihi and Tama were created because of this. As part of the revamp, producers wished for a more community based cast with established family links, mimicking the past presence of the Warner and McKenna families. The Hudson's arrival was said to be a "shock" for the established character of Te Hana's brother, Victor Kahu (Calvin Tuteao). Vanessa Rare was cast in the role. Rare left the role in 2003 but returned in several sporadic stints. She returned for several episodes in a guest role in 2003 and returned the following year for several months before departing on 28 January 2005. She returned in 2006 for another guest stint as part of on screen son David Wikaira-Paul's departure.

== Storylines ==
Te Hana arrived with her family for a fresh start but she grew annoyed at her brother Victor's (Calvin Tuteao) attempts to break up her marriage to Joe Hudson (Rawiri Paratene). Te Hana developed a crush on Geoff Greenlaw (Andrew Laing) and the two eventually kissed, only to be caught by Te Hana's daughter Mihi (Quantrelle King) who told Joe, ending the marriage. It seemed Te Hana and Joe were heading for reconciliation but he ended up leaving the country and Te Hana and Geoff got together. Te Hana realized Geoff had killed a patient and took the blame, suffering a demotion. She was delighted to welcome her foster daughter Shannon (Amber Curreen) back into her life but discovered she was pregnant to her teenage son Tama Hudson (David Wikaira-Paul). Te Hana's demotion continued to drive her away from Geoff and the two broke up before Te Hana left Ferndale to be closer to Mihi. She made a brief return later in the year and was shocked to learn Geoff was in fact gay.

Te Hana returned to support Victor following his arrest for the murder of Geoff. After being delegated the position of charge nurse while Judy (Donogh Rees) was assigned to office work by Andrew Solomon (Paolo Rotondo), Te Hana took a break before returning. Not long after returning, Te Hana was angered to find that Tama had gotten back together with Shannon after she had cheated on him with Vinnie Kruse (Pua Magasiva) and was further angered by the fact the two had decided to get married on Christmas Day. Despite initially deciding to boycott the ceremony, Te Hana gave her blessing to Shannon and attended. Te Hana would then get together in the New Year with Bronson Paraone (Kirk Torrance). Te Hana decided to take a brief break with Bronson to visit the family marae, however she ended up not returning. Te Hana returned a year later to support Tama and his custody battle against Shannon for their daughter Rangimarie (Mia Curreen-Poko) after the two split when Shannon once again strayed from Tama and got into a relationship with Tama's cousin Whetu (Taungaroa Emile). Amongst the hostilities between Tama and Shannon and Whetu, Te Hana would assault her daughter in law. After Tama and Shannon realised the other parties were a distraction, the two talked things out and decided to split amicably with Shannon getting custody. Shannon and Whetu would leave Ferndale for good with Te Hana and Tama doing the same in April 2006.

== Character development ==
Upon arrival Te Hana was described as; "a strong Maori woman" and was "fiercely ambitious for her kids". The move to the city proved positive for Te Hana, as she was "determined to get ahead now that she and her family have made a fresh start in the city". Te Hana was also said to be "on a mission to achieve success for herself and her family on her own terms." Producer Simon Bennett described the family, stating "The Hudson family is poor. They’ve moved to the city from the country and they’re trying to start a new life with nothing".

== Reception ==
Producer Simon Bennett did not enjoy the introduction of the Hudson family, stating: "With the best will in the world the intention to introduce a down on their luck Maori family who moved from the country to the city came across as mawkish and somewhat PC in flavour." The inclusion of the Hudson family did however bring on a more appropriately balanced amount of Māori culture into the soap both on and offscreen. The Hudson "era" has since been identified as the peak of Māori inclusion in the show. It was also said to introduce a large Māori audience and help accurately define the race demographics.
