= Jay Copeland =

- Shortland Street character
- Portrayed by: Jaime Passier-Armstrong
- Duration: 2004–2007
- First appearance: Episode 3002; 25 June 2004
- Last appearance: 28 August 2007
- Introduced by: Harriet Crampton
In-universe information
- Occupation: Bar Manager
- Father: Victor Kahu
- Mother: Diana Copeland
- Stepmother: Anne Kahu
- Brothers: Nelson Copeland
- Civil partner: Maia Jeffries (2006–2007)
- Stepsons: Jay "JJ" Jeffries
- Grandfathers: Kahikatea Kahu
- Grandmothers: Makana Kahu
- Uncles: Joe Hudson
- Aunts: Te Hana Hudson
- First cousins: Mihi Hudson; Tama Hudson

Jessica "Jay" Copeland is a fictional character on the New Zealand soap opera Shortland Street who was portrayed by Jaime Passier-Armstrong from mid-2004 to mid-2007. She was the show's first lesbian regular character and longtime love interest for Maia Jeffries (Anna Jullienne).

Jay arrived to the show as the estranged daughter of established character - Victor Kahu (Calvin Tuteao). Closeted to her family, Jay had been dating her girlfriend Maia for months. What followed on screen was 3 years of an on-again, off-again romance storyline that would see the two become married, separated and Maia eventually widowed. Jay's contentment to her sexuality saw her a vast contrast to Maia who was at first self-conscious and shy, however following their devastating breakup, the roles reversed and the characterisation for both characters changed dramatically. Following Passier-Armstrongs wish to leave the show, Jay was written off in a high-profile manner in mid-2007 when she became the third victim in the highly successful Ferndale Strangler storyline.

Jay proved to be a hugely popular character, with fans insisting she be reinstated following her departure in 2004. Her relationship with Maia also received a warm welcome, with the storyline reportedly stopping a woman from committing suicide.

== Creation and casting ==
Jay was introduced as the daughter of Victor Kahu in June 2004. The character was only intended for 3 months but following outstanding public reaction, the character was brought back as a regular character. Passier-Armstrong decided to leave the soap and opted not to sign her contract meaning she would depart in March 2007. She stated; "I was only supposed to be on the show for three months originally. I never expected to stay on there for three years ... Shortland Street has been an extraordinary journey but it consumes your life, basically. I'm an extremely family-oriented person and I haven't been able to have much time in the last three years for myself or my family." The show was about to undergo a serial killer storyline and producer, Jason Daniel managed to convince Passier-Armstrong to stay on for several more months so that her character could be killed off as part of the storyline.

== Storylines ==
Jay arrived to Ferndale to visit her father, Victor Kahu (Calvin Tuteao) with her traveling partner - Maia (Anna Jullienne). However Jay's family soon realized Jay and Maia were really lovers. Jay refused to forgive Victor for her upbringing and following his arrest for the murder of Geoff Greenlaw (Andrew Laing), Jay broke up with Maia and fled to Australia. She returned five months later to attend her cousin - Tama's (David Wikaira-Paul) wedding and soon her feelings for Maia reignited. The two reconciled but Norman Hanson (Jacob Tomuri) came between them when Jay slept with him in a desperate bid to fall pregnant. However following his death, she reconciled with Maia and the two wed on Valentine's Day.

Jay's business started to take off when she was noticed by business man Dylan Preston (Paul Glover). To further her career, she began sleeping with him, but when Maia found out, both relationships ended and Jay was left with nothing. She bought the local bar and eventually reconciled but the issue of trust remained and they again broke up when they couldn't agree on their desperation for pregnancy. Jay helped Maia through her pregnancy and it seemed the two were going to reconcile, but when Jay let Maia's mother Yvonne (Alison Quigan) know who the father was, Maia broke it off indefinitely with Jay. Left with nothing, Jay decided to leave Ferndale to live with her mother in Australia. However, only hours after she had said her farewells, good friend Alice Piper (Toni Potter) and Kip Denton (Will Hall) discovered Jay's lifeless body on the bed of a creek on a jogging track; she had been murdered by a serial killer dubbed "The Ferndale Strangler".

== Character development ==
=== Relationship with Maia Jeffries ===
Jay and Maia Jeffries arrived in June 2004 and it was soon clear the two traveling partners were in fact lesbian partners. The lovers were revealed when Shannon spotted the two kissing for the episodes cliffhanger. Producers were initially hesitant to introduce lesbian characters, with head writer Maxine Fleming stating; "She's in relationships so it does come up but we have tried to avoid lesbian-based stories ... Of course when you have kids and stuff, that's the thing they want to talk about. My daughter wants to know if they’re lesbians in real life and how do they feel about kissing. So obviously it is an issue but not for us so much." Jay was at first shown to be the strong and confident one in the relationship whilst Maia was a lot more self-conscious. The two broke up following Jay's refusal to accept her father and the roles reversed dramatically with Maia's actor - Anna Jullienne stating; "There was almost a role reversal for Jay and me, because I found it so easy to settle in and she didn't ... All of a sudden I'm the one telling guys to get lost when they're perving." The two actresses were good friends in real life, making the kissing scenes fluent and natural.

Jay fled to Australia but upon return attempted to reunite with Maia who had moved on. The return saw an intense love triangle as the 2005 season started. Jullienne believed the two would reunite, saying; "The relationship ended but the love didn't ... Jay was in a difficult situation: her dad had just been convicted for murder, there was a lot going on and things just weren't working out for Jay in Ferndale. She couldn't stay there, she had to leave. But that didn't change the way she and Maia felt about each other. Maia's relationships since Jay have never had any real substance to them ... Everyone is compared to Jay in her book. Jay is definitely the love of her life, the 'one'." The two did eventually reconcile and overcame the slight bump of Jay sleeping with Norman in an attempt to have a child. The pair married in a civil union on Valentine's Day 2006 attended by friends and colleagues. The ceremony was gatecrashed by a group of religious protesters who were scared off by Maia's disapproving mother - Yvonne.

Passier-Armstrong hoped the two would live happily-ever-after, saying; "There were a lot of ups and downs last year for Maia and Jay, and also a lot of other people that were mixed up in their relationship too. Mark (Tim Foley) was hanging around Maia, Jay and Norman (Jacob Tomuri) had their whole baby deal thing going on - there was Yvonne and her refusal to accept Maia and Jay. They've been through a lot and the wedding is a good chance to show they came through it, they love each other and they want to be together; forever hopefully, fingers crossed." She was disappointed when she learned Jay was going to cheat on Maia, stating; "I was heartbroken when I read the storyline. But it's a drama. Anna and I always knew that there would come a time where one of our characters would end up having an affair. When I started on the show I was told I was going to be a very staunch gay character so I played that. Then I received scripts with this new storyline and I was like, what? There were a lot of times that they'd call cut and I'd say to Anna, 'I'm so sorry! It's not my fault!'. However she acknowledged 6 months of marriage on the show was seemingly the equivalent of 10 years in real life terms. Jay's affair was with her boss Dylan, in an attempt to further her career. The affair put an end to her marriage with Maia and she didn't end up with Dylan either. Jay took the breakup badly. The two eventually reconciled over their desperation for a child. However when Jay told Yvonne that Maia had used her sister Tania's husband - Mark's sperm behind her back, Maia broke it off indefinitely. The couple's love never had resolution when Jay became the third victim of the Ferndale Strangler.

== Reception ==
In 2006 Passier-Armstrong was nominated for a New Zealand television award for "Best Actress". After originally being a short term character, Jay was brought back when fans thoroughly enjoyed the character. They asked producer - Harriet Crampton to keep Jay on the show and ensure she remains a lesbian. Jay was called a "popular" character. The civil union between Jay and her girlfriend Maia Jeffries, proved a ratings hit, receiving an audience of 531,000 and beating current affair shows - Close Up and Campbell Live. The episode also broke ground, becoming the first televised civil union between two characters of the same sex on prime time New Zealand television. The pair were labelled; "New Zealand hottest lesbian couple". When the two broke up, the show received an influx of fan mail asking when the two would reunite. Passier-Armstrong was pleased with the work the couple had done and learned that a suicidal closeted lesbian had come out due to the characters. When the show received criticism in 2008 over gay oral sex scenes, producer - Jason Daniel accused TVNZ of double standards citing Jay and Maia's lesbian relationship as an example. The characters civil union and the storyline that saw Jay cheat on Maia with a man was voted by fans as two of the show's most iconic moments.
