= Vinnie Kruse =

- Shortland Street character
- Portrayed by: Pua Magasiva
- Duration: 2003–2006, 2011–2018
- First appearance: 25 November 2003
- Last appearance: 19 July 2018
- Introduced by: Harriet Crampton (2003); Steven Zanoski (2011)
In-universe information
- Occupation: Hotel department manager Nurse; I.V. Bar Owner; Paramedic
- Sisters: Natalia Kruse
- Wife: Nicole Miller (2015–2018)
- Sons: Michael Hampton-Rees; Pele Kruse-Miller
- Uncles: Talafao Kruse
- Aunts: Louisa Kruse; Mary Faasavalu
- First cousins: Maxwell Avia; Tamasi'i Kruse; Talia Kruse; Sef Kruse
- Other relatives: Ula Levi

Vainu'u "Vinnie" Kruse-Miller (previously Kruse) is a fictional character from the New Zealand soap opera Shortland Street, played by Pua Magasiva. Vinnie first arrived on 25 November 2003, leaving the show on 23 February 2006. He made a return to the soap after a five-year gap on 16 August 2011.

The role was created specially for Magasiva and Vinnie is known for his party-loving and easy-going ways. His introduction saw a new group of young characters that formed a demographic for "hip, young things". Usually involved in comedic relief, Vinnie also participated in several melodramatic story lines such as the high-profile affair with his good friend Tama Hudson's (David Wikaira-Paul) girlfriend Shannon Te Ngaru (Amber Curreen). The storyline was named as a highlight of the 2004 season and cemented Vinnie's label as a "heart throb". Magasiva quit the role in 2006 and the character was written out when he accidentally impregnated tourist girlfriend – Jemima Hampton (Liesha Ward Knox). Vinnie made his return in 2011 and in the intervening years, the characters family was introduced, making the soap's first ever Polynesian family unit.

The character was well received and remains known as a heart throb, with Magasiva beating out his brother Robbie for "Hottest Male" in the TV Guide Best on the Box Awards 2012. Vinnie has also been named as one of the fans favourite characters and Magasiva, the favourite actor.

== Creation and casting ==
Pua Magasiva had previously auditioned successfully for the guest role of Elvis Iosefa, the cousin of established character Louie in 1999. He appeared for several episodes; however, four years later, he was offered the full-time role of Vinnie Kruse, a core cast member. Vinnie made his first appearance in late 2003. Storyliner Victor Roger helped shape the character and named him 'Vainu'u "Vinnie"' after a family member of his, aiming to accurately portray Pacific culture. The character was said to bring rebellion to the nurses and Magasiva hoped the character portrayed Pacific Islanders correctly, stating; "I wanted to make Vinnie very cultural, a character that Pacific Island people can relate to." Magasiva soon decided to try his luck elsewhere and quit the role. The character departed in early 2006 and early reports suggested he was axed as part of a large cast overhaul at the time; however, this was not the case. In reality, Magasiva's resignation brought on the large cast overhaul, which was an attempt by producers to represent a culturally proportional society after the exit of the shows only Pacific Islander. Magasiva soon regretted the decision, stating: "I took a risk and I left. The work didn't come."

Magasiva returned to the role after five years in August 2011. In 2015 Magasiva announced he would stay with the show "as long as they'll have [him]" and expressed his desire for Vinnie to become the next Chris Warner (the show's longest running character). In late 2015 online rumours surfaced that Magasiva had left the show, though he denied this the following month. Following a series of controversial actions off-screen, Magasiva departed the soap opera in 2018. The actor died the following year, with Shortland Street airing a tribute to him on-screen.

== Storylines ==
Director of Nursing Judy Brownlee (Donogh Rees) hired Vinnie at the hospital in late 2003 and he instantly frustrated his colleagues with his party boy ways. Vinnie started an affair with good friend Tama's (David Wikaira-Paul) girlfriend Shannon Te Ngaru (Amber Curreen) which collapsed shortly after the two went public. He fell deeply in love with Tania Jeffries (Faye Smythe) but the presence of Mark Weston (Tim Foley) drove the two apart and Vinnie moved on to backpacker Jemima Hampton (Liesha Ward Knox). Being promoted to charge nurse, Vinnie began to feel the pressure and work and following the unexpected death of a patient, he resigned to become a paramedic. Vinnie shortly returned to nursing after attending a gruesome murder scene. Shortly after, Jemima fell pregnant and a scared Vinnie broke up with her. However Vinnie soon grew on the idea of fatherhood and opted to reconcile with Jemima and move to her home country in the United Kingdom to raise the child.

5 years later Vinnie returned to the hospital and quickly gained a senior nursing role. Quickly building a close friendship with fellow nurse Nicole (Sally Martin), Vinnie revealed he had lost custody of his son following a separation from Jemima. Vinnie soon started to date Brooke Freeman (Beth Allen) but her manipulative ways led him to dump her for a brief relationship with her sister Bree (Rachel Blampied). A short relationship with Emma Franklin (Amy Usherwood) was ended when he had an affair with her best friend Kylie (Kerry-Lee Dewing). Eventually realising he was in love with best-friend Nicole, a continued romance with Kylie ended any potential relationship. However after welcoming his son Michael (Duane Evans Jr.) permanently into his life, Nicole and Vinnie confessed their love and she fell pregnant. Despite Nicole suffering health scare during birth, the couple welcome a son Pele (Feleti Peter Aulika). Following Nicole's recovery from postnatal depression, she proposed and the couple were married by Vinnie's cousin Maxwell Avia (Robbie Magasiva) acting as celebrant.

Interested in exploring new business ventures, Vinnie convinced Nicole to buy 'The I.V.' bar and hotel alongside buying a house together. Raising two children alongside the business put financial strain on the couple, leading Nicole to cheat with new nurse Ruby Flores (JJ Fong). Eventually reconciling, the family were hit with more difficult news when Pele was diagnosed with Type I diabetes and Michael's departure to live with Jemima in Singapore. Continuing to look for new business investments, the financial issues proved too great and Vinnie opted to sell the bar and their house. Vinnie shared a kiss with former flame Teuila Newton (Tameka Sowman), who offered him the management of a resort overseas. Despite the tempting offer and a potential romance, Vinnie opted to stay in Ferndale with Nicole for family reasons but a continued bitterness remained. Shortly after Vinnie was forced to rush to Singapore to help with Michael when Jemima suffered a stroke. She recovered but he opted to prolong his stay to manage a hospitality business. Despite pleading with Nicole to move over with Pele, she remained in Ferndale and Vinnie chose to end the marriage via video call and stay permanently in Singapore.

== Character development ==
=== Characterisation ===
Describing Vinnie, Magasiva stated: "Personality-wise we're a bit similar, very outgoing sort of characters. Even though he is always playing around, he does get serious at times – especially with his work. He is serious about it and wants to do well. Apart from that he likes to have fun, he likes to tease people and dance around and just have fun." His high energy leads to him being popular with both staff and patients. Vinnie loves to party and is a hit with women, even making moves on lesbian flatmate Maia Jeffries (Anna Jullienne). Magasiva hoped he could portray Vinnie so that he could embody the Polynesian population of New Zealand, stating: "He is very typical, but that's the way some of us are. We're being real people, I'm trying to be a real Samoan person, not trying to pretend to be someone else but just to be myself. And it shows when you see Vinnie, the way he talks — Pacific Islanders are loud. You know where they are from a mile away. You get a whole bunch of people laughing, that's a whole bunch of Pacific Islanders." In 2004 the character became part of a group of "hip, young things" alongside Tama Hudson (David Wikaira-Paul), Shannon Te Ngaru (Amber Curreen), Maia Jeffries, Norman Hanson (Jacob Tomuri) and Li Mei Chen (Li Ming Hu). The group embodied the "cool" and "groovy" demographic and were often found partying at their flat 'El Rancho' or the local bar. The group were described as: "witty, fun and spontaneous. They throw parties, play practical jokes, have complicated love lives, they stress about boy/girlfriends, best friends, what to do with their lives and what to wear to parties. What more could you want in a group of friends?" By the character's return in 2011, his cousin Maxwell Avia (Robbie Magasiva) has become the patriarch of a new family unit, cementing Vinnie in the middle and creating the soap's first-ever Polynesian family unit in the 20-year history. Following Maxwell's departure in 2012, Vinnie was integrated into scenes and storylines within the family unit, effectively uniting him as the patriarch of the characters.

=== Affair with Shannon Te Ngaru ===
In 2004, Vinnie begins an affair with the girlfriend of his good friend Tama Hudson (David Wikaira-Paul), Shannon Te Ngaru (Amber Curreen). The romance initially was hidden; however, it soon became public, a scene Wikaira-Paul enjoyed, "The most memorable thing for me this year was when Tama found out that Shannon was playing on him. I'd formed a huge bond with the character, so it was kind of personal. It surprised me how much I actually cared." Magasiva described Shannon as Vinnie's first love but noted she had become preoccupied with Tama, "Shannon's the first eye opener, the first girl who's really caught his heart. He's really serious about her. There's nothing that will hold him back. He's so in love with her." However, following the arrest of Tama's uncle Victor Kahu (Calvin Tuteao) and their checkered past together, Vinnie is suspicious as to whether Shannon loves him back. Curreen believed that Shannon was destined to love Tama not Vinnie: "Shannon wants Tama. She truly loves him, and now sees what a good thing they had. She feels terrible about herself – she has lost everything good in her life." The affair ends poorly for Vinnie, with Tama and Shannon marrying on Christmas Day 2004.

=== Relationship with Jemima Hampton ===
The arrival of Jemima Hampton (Liesha Ward Knox) in mid-2005 proved a new start for Vinnie who was struggling to withstand a relationship after his affair with Shannon Te Ngaru (Amber Curreen). Magasiva explained the attraction: "She's different. There is something about her that just excites him." However Ward Knox was hesitant that the two would have any long standing relationship, stating: "Jemima lives in her own little version of the world. She is the kind or person that would walk into a supermarket, take a can of spaghetti from the bottom of a stack and walk away; when it all comes crashing down behind her, she'd just say 'Oh! It must have been the air conditioning!' She just really has no idea of the problems she causes." Vinnie and Jemima end up together only for Vinnie to discover Jemima is married. She ends up leaving Vinnie upset and alone. However, Jemima returns in December 2005 and announces her pregnancy with Vinnie as the father. Vinnie ends up leaving Ferndale to live with Jemima and his unborn child in England. Offscreen, the two settle in after the birth of their son, Michael Kruse, but soon get into fights over Vinnie's party boy behaviour and when he misses Jemima's fathers birthday in 2011, she and Michael abandon him. In 2014 Jemima returned to the show with her son and a storyline took place where Jemima begins to redevelop her crush on Vinnie; Ward-Knox explained, "Jemima is dealing with a crumbling marriage, the prospect of being a solo mum again and Vinnie is a beacon of stability amongst the chaos ... Vinnie is willing to be so accommodating because he is one of the only people who truly understands her world and the way she operates within it."

=== Relationship with Nicole Miller ===
When Vinnie Kruse arrives in 2011, Nicole makes an embarrassing move on him but they forget about it and become best friends. In 2013 Vinnie's and Nicole's feelings for each other increase but both of them are too shy to admit it. They finally do and get together for a while but eventually Vinnie falls in love with another nurse and breaks up with Nicole. Nicole, upset about another failed relationship, marries in November 2013. There, Vinnie realises what a huge mistake he had made breaking up with her. When Nicole gets into a relationship with Doctor Harper Whitley, Vinnie gives up on trying to get Nicole back. But when Nicole's mother Leanne comes, who disagrees with her sexuality, she convinces Vinnie to secretly try and win over Nicole's heart. Nicole quickly realises she is still in love with Vinnie and Harper at the same time. After switching from Vinnie to Harper a couple of times, Nicole finally chooses Vinnie. Only three weeks into their relationship, Nicole become's pregnant with Vinnie's child. In the end they choose to keep the baby. After giving birth, Nicole has a brain bleed which led to a seizure, resulting in her being in a coma, and Vinnie is devastated. Nicole wakes up after a week but life is hard for them. In a few months Nicole gets better and after her credit card scam, and Vinnie believing in her, she proposes. In September 2015 they get married. In the 2015 Christmas finale, Vinnie and his son Michael are held in a hostage situation along with Leanne and some staff and patients. Vinnie Michael and Leanne get out safely.

Their relationship goes badly for the next two years, with Vinnie's business coming unglued and Pele's diabetes also taking a toll on their relationship. Michael's move to Singapore to live with his biological mother, Jemima, also takes a toll.

In 2018, Michael calls Vinnie to say that Jemima has suffered a stroke, so Vinnie has to rush to Singapore. Once her condition stabilises, Vinnie is offered a role to work in one of the hotels that she manages.

== Reception ==
Upon arrival it was clear that Vinnie was a heart throb, something Magasiva was not too sure about. The love triangle between Vinnie, Shannon and Tama was named as the most popular romance storyline to feature in 2004. Magasiva believed Vinnie's most memorable storyline was when he became a gigolo. In the 2011 Throng Shortland Street fan awards, Vinnie took out runner up for "Favourite Male Character" and Magasiva took out get runner up in "Favourite Actor". Vinnie's 2011 return was named as one of the highlights of the season and in 2013, was listed as the 9th best ever character return storyline on the soap by the Shortland Street website. Magasiva placed runner up for "Hottest Male" in the TV Guide Best on the Box Awards 2012, beating out his brother Robbie. Magasiva was nominated for "Favourite Actor" in the 2012 Nowie awards for his portrayal of Vinnie. A scene where Vinnie dreamt of his cousin's ex-wife, Vasa Levi (Teuila Blakely) making sexual moves on him, was named as one of the top moments of the 2012 season. In the Ferndale Talk Best of 2013 awards, Vinnie was voted "Favourite Character", with Magasiva also landing the "Favourite Actor" award. Magasiva also placed runner up for "Best Looking Male" In 2015 Magasiva received a nomination for "Best Actor" in the TV Guide Best on the Box Awards.
