= Joe Hudson (Shortland Street) =

- Shortland Street character
- Portrayed by: Rawiri Paratene
- Duration: 2001–2002
- First appearance: 9 May 2001
- Last appearance: 30 July 2002
- Created by: Jason Daniel
- Introduced by: Simon Bennett
In-universe information
- Occupation: Security guard Former soldier
- Wife: Te Hana Kahu
- Sons: Tama Hudson
- Daughters: Mihi Hudson
- Grandsons: Te Ngakau Hudson
- Granddaughters: Rangimarie Hudson
- Nephews: Nelson Copeland; Whetu Hudson
- Nieces: Jay Copeland

Joe Hudson is a fictional character on the New Zealand soap opera Shortland Street who was portrayed by Rawiri Paratene from 2001 to 2002.

== Creation and casting ==
In 2000 an Australian consultant made several large changes to the show that would see a more working class hospital portrayed. Joe, his wife Te Hana and children Mihi and Tama were created because of this. As part of the revamp, producers wished for a more community based cast with established family links, mimicking the past presence of the Warner and McKenna families. Rawiri Paratene was cast in the role. The Hudson's arrival was said to be a "shock" for the established character of Te Hana's brother, Victor Kahu (Calvin Tuteao). Paratene stated upon gaining the role, "It's fantastic to be here. I've come from a situation where I worked with young actors who looked up to me for guidance. Now, I've landed in a job where I work with a lot of game, fit young actors who I look to for guidance."

== Storylines ==
Joe arrived to Ferndale with the Hudson family for a fresh start and immediately clashed with his wife Te Hana's (Vanessa Rare) brother Victor (Calvin Tuteao), who thought Te Hana could do better. Joe struggled to find a job and was victimized by the police due to his race. He eventually was hired as a security guard but was devastated to learn Te Hana had cheated on him with Geoff Greenlaw (Andrew Laing) and the two bitterly separated. Joe reluctantly stayed in Ferndale and for a while it seemed he and Te Hana were going to reconcile, but it was not to be and Joe soon left for a job in the Middle East. 2 years later Joe had returned to New Zealand and was living in Northland as indicated when Tama Hudson (David Wikaira-Paul) visited him. Te Hana offered to take Tama's daughter, Rangimarie (Mia Curreen-Poko) up north as Joe was willing to look after her.

== Character development ==
Joe was described as having been brought up on "the wrong side of the tracks." The families arrival to Ferndale was Joe's decision so as to; "prove himself a worthy husband to Te Hana and a good father to Mihi and Tama." Joe was proud of his family but resented the presence of brother in law, Victor Kahu. Producer Simon Bennett described the family, stating; "The Hudson family is poor. They’ve moved to the city from the country and they’re trying to start a new life with nothing,". Paratene enjoyed his character, stating, "Joe's cool. Basically, he's a good man with lots of good points, which also become his weak points. Things like pride, love for his whanau, stubbornness, determination, and independence are all areas where he can shine and stumble. And he's able to pull himself up again and grow." He was pleased about the development of the Hudson family and its portrayal of Māori culture, "I'm curious to see how Maori react to this family because traditionally we Maori are very sensitive and protective about our image on the screen. We're quick off the mark to react... The family are fantastic, and I hope we can be quite daring with them because at the moment there's lots of room for them to grow and develop. The Hudson family affords actors the opportunity for all kinds of subtle inter-relationships amongst themselves and with the other characters. That's what excites me most."

== Reception ==
Producer Simon Bennett did not enjoy the introduction of the Hudson family, stating: "With the best will in the world the intention to introduce a down on their luck Maori family who moved from the country to the city came across as mawkish and somewhat PC in flavour." Paratene himself enjoyed Joe's introduction, believing the Hudson family inclusion not only reflected the show's growing determination to accurately portray Maori and also widen the family aspect of New Zealand drama, but also believed it led the show in a more positive direction. The inclusion of the Hudson family did however bring on a more appropriately balanced amount of Māori culture into the soap both on and offscreen. The Hudson "era" has since been identified as the peak of Māori inclusion in the show. It was also said to introduce a large Māori audience and help accurately define the race demographics.
