= Donna Heka =

- Shortland Street character
- Portrayed by: Stephanie Tauevihi
- Duration: 1997–2004
- First appearance: Episode 1352; 30 September 1997
- Last appearance: Episode 3140; 25 December 2004
- Introduced by: Simon Bennett (1997); Harriet Crampton (2004)
In-universe information
- Other names: Donna Kahu
- Occupation: Medical assistant Paramedic
- Father: Te Wero Whaia
- Mother: Mavis Bennett
- Adoptive father: Joe Bennett
- Half-brothers: Matt Bennett; Joshua Bennett
- Husband: Eddie Heka (until 1995); Rangi Heremaia (2000–2001)
- Stepsons: Toka Heremaia
- Stepdaughters: Natasha HeremaiaJay Copeland
- Uncles: Willy Whaia
- First cousins: Ramon Leilisi

Donna Heka (also Bennett) is a fictional character on the New Zealand soap opera Shortland Street, who was portrayed by Stephanie Tauevihi from 1997 to mid-2004 and again for a two episode stint in December 2004.

Donna arrived in 1997 as a potential love interest for established character Rangi Heremaia (Blair Strang). What followed, became one of Shortland Street's most iconic storylines, with the happy couple discovering they were, in fact, related. The story arc carried on for 2 years when the two realised they were not related and married on the show's 2000th episode. Despite Rangi being killed off, Donna continued on the show and soon became one of the show's longest running characters. Storylines for Donna included being framed for murder, suffering a mental breakdown and kidnapping a baby, helping clear Victor (Calvin Tuteao) of murder and becoming Chris Warner's (Michael Galvin) mistress. The character departed in mid-2004 before returning in a two episode stint on Christmas the same year.

The character's romance with Rangi is remembered as hugely iconic as well as the characters long duration.

== Creation and casting ==
The character of Donna was created as a love interest for established character Rangi Heremaia. Stephanie Tauevihi was cast in the role after at first worrying the producers with the lack of chemistry towards Rangi's actor, Blair Strang. Despite the fast turnaround of the show, Tauevihi enjoyed the experience of working in the soap. After 7 years Tauevihi started to feel she had lost herself in the role and decided to leave. The character was written off as departing to Australia, something which disappointed Tauevihi, who had wished Donna was going to be killed off. In 2010 Angela Bloomfield jokingly suggested that she would bring Tauevihi back if the producers could afford it.

== Storylines ==
Donna arrived to the clinic and soon started an affair with her paramedic partner Rangi Heremaia (Blair Strang). However, when Donna's family visited, the couple were shocked to learn Donna's father Joe (Tony Burton), was also Rangi's father, making the couple siblings. The two broke up and Donna fled Ferndale. She returned and became a medical assistant. After a failed attempt at a relationship with Frank Malone (Christopher Hobbs), Donna helped prove Rangi was innocent when he was accused of abusing elderly women and the two started another short lived controversial relationship. Donna briefly dated John Harlen (Matthew Chamberlain) and won a recording contract with her ex-husband Eddie Heka (Hori Ahipene). The two started an affair and Donna met Willy Whaia who she eventually suspected may be her true father. Donna had a DNA test done and was shocked to learn he was indeed her father and she was a result of an affair. However, when Willy died, his brother Te Wero confessed he was Donna's true father. Having broken up with Eddie, Donna looked forward to a future with Rangi but he had moved on and Donna rebounded with Paul Exley (Rory Williamson). Donna was framed by her neighbour for murder and Rangi helped clear her. The two finally reconciled and got married. Donna had a pregnancy scare and decided to have a family with Rangi but her low fertility forced to two to start IVF treatment.

Rangi mysteriously went missing and weeks later his body was found. A devastated Donna refused to believe he had killed himself and eventually discovered he was having an affair and his mistress' husband Kim Tairoa (Patrick Kake) had drowned him when he had announced his devotion to Donna. An emotional Donna had a one-night stand with Victor Kahu (Calvin Tuteao) and suffered a mental breakdown leading her to kidnap Harry Warner (Joshua Thompson). Following her recovery, she got together with Harry's father Chris (Michael Galvin). Donna took in Rangi's daughter Tash (Michelle Stewart) and broke up with Chris when Dom (Shane Cortese) manipulated Tash into claiming Chris had molested her and revealed that Chris had cheated on her. Donna turned to Victor for support and the two started a relationship. Whilst Victor was in remand for murder, Donna bid her farewells to Ferndale and moved to Australia with Tash. She returned to attend Tama's (David Wikaira-Paul) wedding before she returned to Australia with a newly released Victor. Toni (Laura Hill) announced Donna was going to return to be her bridesmaid but she bailed several days before the ceremony. Donna and Victor sent Chris a card to express their sadness that they could not attend Toni's funeral.

== Character development ==
=== Relationship with Rangi ===
Donna was created as a love interest for the character of Rangi Initially the romance was meant to be straight forward but when an incestuous storyline was suggested, producers realized the large amount of content they could produce and a storyline where the happy couple would realize they are half siblings was conducted. The revelation caused Rangi to begin drinking and Donna to flee town. However the audience related well to the couple and when producers decided to make the two sleep again, there were no complaints from fans as were expected. Due to such high audience reaction, the paternity was unraveled in 1999, setting off a cliffhanger that saw the two possibly reconcile in the new millennium. When Donna was accused of murder, Rangi helped her through it and the two reconciled and married on the show's 2000th episode. Tauevihi enjoyed the couples marital bliss stating; "I had a huge storyline ... so it's nice to give that a bit of a flick, sit back and settle into post-marital domestic bliss. There are lots of soft, gentle moments between [Donna and Rangi] which is really nice to play out when you've been doing the angst-ridden, angry, pent-up, can't talk about it stuff." The two decided to become parents but Donna was shocked to discover she was infertile, Tauevihi commented, "It's her natural desire as a woman to want to be a mother and to nurture and to reproduce, so when that's taken away from her she's totally devastated ... She feels as though she's failed Rangi. Even though he's doing his best to smooth it over and to reassure her, it's just not enough."It's a very personal issue and Donna feels totally responsible." The happiness didn't last for the couple, and Rangi went missing only to be discovered dead. Tauevihi enjoyed the storyline, stating, "It's a great storyline! It will knock everyone's socks off and it's been a great challenge for me to play." Donna discovered Rangi was cheating on her but had decided to stay with her only to be murdered by his mistress and her husband.

== Reception ==
Tauevihi won the award for "Best Supporting Actress" in the 2000 TV Guide Television Awards. Her run of storylines have been described as "spectacular" and the character herself has been labelled, "iconic". The incestuous relationship between Rangi and Donna proved to be one of the soap's most iconic storylines, with the wedding episode being singled out as one of Shortland Street's best bits. Years later, storyliner Victor Rodger reflected on the incest plot critically, citing its use of an "unfortunate stereotype": "There were storylines that I struggled with as a Samoan. But, how I used to look at it is that it's largely a palagi show that happens to have diverse actors in it, largely ... I'm sure that culture has changed to a degree, but once you recognize that, you go, ‘OK, this would never happen in real life, but this is a soap opera." In 2012, the character was named as one of the standout characters of the show's first 20 years.
