= List of Shortland Street characters introduced in 2001 =

The following is a list of characters that first appeared in the New Zealand soap opera Shortland Street in 2001, by order of first appearance.

== Marshall Heywood ==
Marshall Heywood
- Shortland Street character
- Portrayed by: Paul Reid
- Duration: 2001–04
- First appearance: 19 February 2001
- Last appearance: 23 February 2004
- Introduced by: Harriet Crampton
In-universe information
- Occupation: Priest (2004–)
- Mother: Barbara Heywood
- Brothers: Adam Heywood

Marshall Heywood debuted in early 2001 as part of the show's revamp. Marshall was the troublesome 17-year-old son of Barbara Heywood (Annie Whittle) and he ended up creepily filming Blake Crombie's (Jesse Peach) family in their home. He dated Erin Kingston (Emma Lahana) before he started sleeping with brother Adam's (Leighton Cardno) much older girlfriend, Robyn Stokes (Kirstie O'Sullivan). Marshall dropped out of school to become an artist but developed a drug addiction and whilst cooking meth in the basement, accidentally exploded the house, leaving Barb temporarily blind. Marshall went on the run but was eventually sentenced to time in a juvenile centre. He dated Shannon TeNgaru (Amber Curreen) before moving onto Mihi Hudson (Quantrelle King), but her family's opposition separated them. In 2003 Marshall grew close to Delphi Greenlaw (Anna Hutchison) but the potential romance was put to an end when he accused her boyfriend, Dom (Shane Cortese) of murdering her brother. The following year Marshall had a near death experience and shockingly moved to Australia to become a priest. In September Barb went to Sydney to witness Marshall get ordained.

== Toni Warner ==
Antoinette "Toni" Warner (née Thompson, formerly McAllister) arrived to the show in 2001 as part of a cast revamp. She was portrayed by Laura Hill for 7 years, in a stint that saw her become the first ever character to give birth, get married and die on screen.

== Adam Heywood ==
Dr. Adam Heywood first arrived to the show in March 2001 as part of the show's revamp. He was portrayed by Leighton Cardno and appeared up until 2003.

== Patricia Hewitt ==
Patricia Hewitt
- Shortland Street character
- Portrayed by: Maureen Edwards
- Duration: 2001–02
- First appearance: April 2001
- Last appearance: 29 March 2002
- Introduced by: Harriet Crampton
In-universe information
- Occupation: Chief Executive Officer of Shortland Street Hospital (2001–02)
- Adoptive sons: Jack Hewitt

Patricia Hewitt first appeared in the soap during the 2001 revamp. She was hired by Chris Warner (Michael Galvin) as the new CEO of the hospital. The staff were shocked when it was revealed that the clean edged and married Patricia had previously been in a lesbian relationship for many years. Patricia's heart began to fail and as the year ended it became clear she needed a transplant. The death of Judy's (Donogh Rees) boyfriend enabled Patricia to receive one but early the following year, she devastatingly lost her son Jack (Manu Bennett). After covering up Jack's severe mental illness, Patricia decided it was best she stood down and she departed Ferndale.

== Lily Jansen ==
Lily Jansen
- Shortland Street character
- Portrayed by: Jodie Rimmer
- Duration: 2001
- First appearance: 4 May 2001
- Last appearance: 3 August 2001
- Introduced by: Harriet Crampton
In-universe information
- Other names: Samara Hindmarsh
- Occupation: Former actress

Lily Jansen made her first appearance in May 2001 under the name Samara Hindmarsh. Chris Warner (Michael Galvin) was shocked to see Samara; he and brother Guy (Craig Parker) had teased her as a child and she had become a beautiful and successful woman. The two began to date, much to the jealousy of Rachel McKenna (Angela Bloomfield), who had fallen in love with Chris. Chris and Samara became engaged however Rachel began to dig dirt on her and discovered her real name was Lily, leading to a dramatic cat fight on the wedding day. Lily's secret was uncovered on the wedding day when the real Samara's mother, Samantha (Judy Rankin) revealed she was not her daughter. It turned out the real Samara was Lily's more successful best friend and when she tragically fell down a cliff on a hike, Lily had jealously stolen her identity. Chris called off the wedding and Lily was arrested.

== Shannon Hudson ==
Shannon Hudson
- Shortland Street character
- Portrayed by: Amber Curreen
- Duration: 2001–06
- First appearance: 6 August 2001
- Last appearance: 18 May 2006
- Introduced by: Harriet Crampton
In-universe information
- Father: Charlie Te Ngaru
- Mother: Rita Te Ngaru
- Husband: Tama Hudson (2004–)
- Sons: Te Ngakau Hudson
- Daughters: Rangimarie Hudson

Shannon Hudson (née Te Ngaru) first appeared in a minor role in 2001. Due to Amber Curreen's convincing acting, Shannon was brought back for several more stints before joining the core cast. Mihi Hudson (Quantrelle King) befriended Shannon when she discovered her dysfunctional family life and she soon became a foster daughter of Mihi's mother, Te Hana (Vanessa Rare). Shannon briefly dated Marshall (Paul Reid), before she had a brief fling with Mihi's young brother Tama Hudson (David Wikaira-Paul). Shannon returned several months later, pregnant with Tama's child. She and Tama reconciled and plans were made for the baby to be adopted. However shortly after giving birth to their baby boy, he died and a devastated Shannon turned to drink and attempted suicide. Shannon and Tama got engaged but feeling lonely, Shannon left Tama for an affair with Vinnie Kruse (Pua Magasiva). She realized she still loved Tama however and the two married on Christmas Day 2004. Shannon gave birth to a daughter named Rangimarie Hudson (Mia Curreen-Poko) however she fell in love with Tama's cousin Whetu (Taungaroa Emile). In 2006 after a bitter custody battle, Shannon took Rangimarie and left with Whetu to live up North.

== Jack Hewitt ==
Jack Hewitt
- Shortland Street character
- Portrayed by: Manu Bennett
- Duration: 2001–02
- First appearance: 9 August 2001
- Last appearance: 21 January 2002
- Introduced by: Harriet Crampton
In-universe information
- Occupation: Lawyer
- Adoptive mother: Patricia Hewitt

Jack Hewitt first appeared in August 2001, portrayed by Manu Bennett. He was the adoptive son of hospital CEO, Patricia Hewitt (Maureen Edwards). Jack was a lawyer and wooed several members of the hospital staff including Toni Thompson (Laura Hill) and Rachel McKenna (Angela Bloomfield). He began to date Rachel but began to suspect her and Chris Warner (Michael Galvin) of having an affair. To spite Chris he uncovered his prior drug addiction and spread it around the hospital. It soon became clear to Rachel that Jack was seriously mentally unwell and was off his medication. As the year ended Jack kidnapped Rachel and attempted to force her to marry him in an isolated forest. Chris tracked the two down however and in early 2002 when he realized he had been caught, Jack threw himself in the path of a truck, instantly killing him.

The portrayal of mental illness through the character of Jack was heavily criticized for its use of stereotyping and inaccuracies. In 2012, the character was named as one of the standout characters of the show's first 20 years.

== Robyn Stokes ==
Robyn Stokes
- Shortland Street character
- Portrayed by: Kirstie O'Sullivan
- Duration: 2001–02, 2004–05
- First appearance: 14 August 2001
- Last appearance: 14 October 2005
- Introduced by: Harriet Crampton (2001, 2002, 2004)
In-universe information
- Occupation: Nurse at Shortland Street hospital (2001, 2004–05)
- Sons: Caleb Stokes

Robyn Stokes first appeared for several weeks in 2001 when she began to date a doctor at the hospital, Adam Heywood (Leighton Cardno). She proved a bad influence on the pregnant Toni Thompson (Laura Hill) and lead her to drink and party. Scandal broke out when it was revealed Robyn had been sleeping with Adam's 17-year-old brother Marshall (Paul Reid) behind Adam's back and following the break up, she departed Ferndale. She returned the following year and desperately tried to lure Toni away with her to Saudi Arabia, leaving her baby boy, Harry (Callum Campbell-Ross) without a mother. Toni declined and Robyn spiked her drink before leaving. Robyn returned again 2 years later and got a job at the hospital.

Robyn had a relationship with Mark Weston (Tim Foley) and blackmailed Dom Thompson (Shane Cortese) about his fraud of the hospital. However her true goal was to reconcile with Andrew Solomon (Paolo Rotondo), whom she had mothered a child with named Caleb, who had died. She went to extremes to steal Andrew from Sarah (Amanda Billing), including drugging and kidnapping his sister Claire (Emily Robins) and hiring a man to run over Andrew. Robyn used Andrew's brain damaged state to sleep with him before she departed. However she returned on the day of Andrew and Sarah's wedding and announced she was pregnant, with twins. The news broke apart the married couple and Andrew departed Ferndale with Robyn to live in England. In March 2006 Claire informed Sarah that Robyn's twins had been born.

O'Sullivan landed a nomination for "Best Actress" in the 2005 TV Guide Best on the Box Awards for her portrayal of Robyn.

== Laurel Dupree ==
Laurel Dupree
- Shortland Street character
- Portrayed by: Andrea Kelland
- Duration: 2001–2002, 2004–2005, 2009, 2011–2012, 2015
- First appearance: 20 August 2001
- Last appearance: 10 February 2015
- Introduced by: Harriet Crampton (2001–05); Steven Zanoski (2009–12); Simon Bennett (2015)
In-universe information
- Other names: Ms. Dupree
- Occupation: Head mistress of Ferndale High School (2002–)
- Husband: Barry Jordan (until 1991); Miles Dupree (1991–)

Laurel Dupree appeared in sporadic guest stints from 2001 to 2015. She was portrayed by the soap opera's casting director - Andrea Kelland. Ms. Dupree was at first the deputy principal of the school when Marshall (Paul Reid), Mihi (Quantrelle King) and Tama (David Wikaira-Paul) attended but the following year, landed the job of principal. Dupree appeared in 2004 when she sorted out bullying by Tash Munro (Michelle Stewart). In 2009 Dupree clashed with Daniel Potts (Ido Drent) due to his badboy antics but warmed to head girl Sophie McKay (Kimberley Crossman). Two years late she invited Vinnie Kruse (Pua Magasiva) to speak to the school about being a doctor after mistaking him for Ula Levi's (Frankie Adams) father, Maxwell Avia (Robbie Magasiva). In 2012 Dupree assured Ula the school would look after her during pregnancy. In 2015 schoolgirls Honour Aleni (Sophie McIntosh) and Clementine Dean (Karima Madut) discovered Ms Dupree had been admitted to hospital for surgery on her breasts - leading the two to believe she was having plastic surgery. They pulled a cruel prank on her only to discover she was actually suffering from breast cancer. Upon discovering the prank, receptionist Leanne Miller (Jennifer Ludlam) punished the two and made them apologise.
