= Adam Heywood =

Fictional character

- Shortland Street character
- Portrayed by: Leighton Cardno
- Duration: 2001–2003
- First appearance: 14 March 2001
- Last appearance: 25 August 2003
- Created by: Jason Daniel
- Introduced by: Simon Bennett
In-universe information
- Occupation: Doctor
- Mother: Barbara Heywood
- Brothers: Marshall Heywood

Adam Heywood is a fictional character in the New Zealand soap opera Shortland Street who was portrayed by Leighton Cardno from early 2001 until mid-2003.

== Creation and casting ==
In 2000 an Australian consultant made several large changes to the show that would see a more working class hospital portrayed. Adam and his mother, Barb and brother, Marshall were introduced through the revamp. As part of the revamp, producers wished for a more community based cast with established family links, mimicking the past presence of the Warner and McKenna families. The Heywood's were created to fulfill this role. Leighton Cardno auditioned for the role and quickly won it. He had little expectations but quickly found he loved the job and relished the opportunity. Cardno was also acting in a series based for teenagers called Being Eve and as such, Adam was portrayed with long dirty hair, something the character would traditionally not have. Although Cardno enjoyed his time on the show, upon arrival he decided to only stay short term so as not to become a "Ken Barlow".

== Storylines ==
Adam arrived to Ferndale alongside his mother Barb (Annie Whittle) and brother Marshall (Paul Reid). He got a job at the hospital and briefly dated Rachel McKenna (Angela Bloomfield) before a brief fling with Robyn Stokes (Kirstie O'Sullivan) which ended when she slept with Marshall. He started a romance with Toni Thompson (Laura Hill). However Adam discovered he was in love with Waverley (Claire Chitham), only to end up sleeping with Toni again. He and Waverley finally got together as the year ended. Waverley eventually dumped Adam and he returned to Toni. But Toni dumped Adam and he attempted to sabotage her wedding to Matt McAllister (Roy Snow). Adam was stabbed by Victor's (Calvin Tuteao) nemesis, Kurt. Adam survived the stabbing but developed a reliance on his medication. Adam reunited with Toni in the aftermath of his addiction but the two broke up indefinitely before Adam departed to the United States.

== Character development ==
=== Characterisation ===
Upon arrival, Adam was labelled the most responsible of the Heywood family and someone wiser than his years. The character's debut year set up the characters initial characterisation but the following year, Adam vastly changed with Cardno stating; "all the strengths of Adam that they established in the first year, this year they flipped around and used them against them. So for someone who was confident and supportive, he's become controlling, dominant and stuck in his ways." Cardno enjoyed portraying the darker side of the character saying; "It's interesting to move towards playing the dark aspects of a person. I felt like last year I was more or less a function, the nice guy. I felt [this year] like I've been exploring new territory, going into areas that were interesting and challenging. That's when it starts to become fun."

== Reception ==
Upon arrival, Cardno opted that the Heywood family unit would be a positive for Shortland Street, stating; "We're people you can relate to. We're the middle-class striving family, never learning lessons. We're good for the Street." Adam's declaration of love towards Waverley Wilson was viewed on positively, something producer – Harriet Crampton, believed was due to it being unexpected. After Adam was stabbed in the 2002 cliffhanger, a phone poll was taken and a majority of voters hoped Adam would not survive.
