= Judy Brownlee =

- Shortland Street character
- Portrayed by: Donogh Rees
- Duration: 2001–2006
- First appearance: 16 March 2001
- Last appearance: 2 February 2006
- Introduced by: Simon Bennett
In-universe information
- Other names: Blossom Brownlee
- Occupation: Nurse
- Father: Morrie Brownlee
- Brothers: Todd Brownlee
- Half-brothers: Justin Brownlee
- Husband: Max Henley (2003)
- Daughters: Anne Kahu

Judy Brownlee is a fictional character on the New Zealand soap opera Shortland Street who was portrayed by Donogh Rees for 5 years from early 2001.

Judy was extremely dedicated to her work and found little time for socializing. She was right wing and a racist, something which she kept out of the workplace and was disclosed about. The owner of two dogs, Judy's romances often ended in disaster, such as her boyfriend dying, her husband dying and failing to draw the attention of her desired heart throb - Craig Valentine (Renato Bartolomei). In 2002 it was discovered that the daughter Judy had adopted out at birth was none other than new nurse, Anne Greenlaw (Emmeline Hawthorne). The twos relationship was at first rocky but by the time Anne had died in 2004, they were extremely close. Judy departed in 2006 when her old boyfriend announced his love.

The character was popular and is remembered for her storyline with Anne. The characters racism proved the topic of debate and provided social commentary.

== Creation and casting ==
In 2000 an Australian consultant made several large changes to the show that would see a more working class hospital portrayed. Judy was introduced as part of the revamp. As part of the revamp, producers wished for a more community based cast with established family links, mimicking the past presence of the Warner and McKenna families. It was decided that Judy's daughter whom she adopted out at birth would arrive later in the year to comply with this new passage. Donogh Rees was cast as the role of Judy and thoroughly enjoyed the majority of the show but found that Judy also had long sections where she had very little to do and thus became bored. She stated, "Often there are few roles for actor's as they approach their middle age, so it's lovely to be working alongside a number of other mature actors, as well as the established cast, of course. Everyone has been incredibly welcoming and I feel we've become a really strong, cohesive unit in a relatively short period of time." Rees found it tedious how so little of Judy's private life was exposed. In 2006 the character was axed alongside 5 other characters as part of a revamp.

== Storylines ==
Judy was hired in to audit the nurses department at the hospital run by Kate Larsen (Rebecca Hobbs). Kate soon left and Judy took her place as director of nursing and briefly dated a rock star named Rich Fortune (Brian Sergent). She started to date a policeman but was devastated when he died and his heart was donated to Patricia (Maureen Edwards). Judy soon learned new nurse - Anne (Emmeline Hawthorne), was in fact the daughter she adopted out at birth. Judy tried to hide the truth but when she came down with a rare kidney disorder, she was forced to beg for Anne's kidney and revealed the truth. Judy began to be stalked by a man named Niel Kepple who murdered her dog. Judy attacked him in self-defence and he ended up in a coma, only to be euthanased by Geoff (Andrew Laing). Judy fell in love with a patient, Max Henley (Peter Hambleton), but discovered he was dying. The two married only for Max to die minutes after the ceremony. Judy was devastated when she realised her daughter Anne had died and blamed Anne's husband, Victor Kahu (Calvin Tuteao). Judy developed feelings for Craig Valentine (Renato Bartolomei) but nothing came of it and Judy found herself lonely when best friend - Barb (Annie Whittle) left Ferndale, leading to her taking up heavy drinking. Judy was delighted when old flame, Mitch Gillespie (John Wraight) arrived in Ferndale. They started to date and Judy decided to live in Australia with him. The two departed in February, both on motorbikes.

== Character development ==
=== Characterisation ===
Judy was seen as uncompromising and professional. Judy was shown to be racist but know to keep her tendencies to herself. Rees thought this was a good personality trait for the character as it made the audience realise the capacity of such thoughts and consider the situations socially. Judy was very professional but found herself with poor social skills as a result. She struggled to make friends and surprised many when she began dating a patient named Max in 2003. Rees stated, "Judy has a tough personality and is incredibly flawed. She has far from politically correct views. An important function of this character is to stimulate debate amongst the viewers, and I think she'll achieve it .... She's not necessarily Robo Nurse. While she may be officious, she's caring towards patients, so there are lots of elements to her, which is great. It makes her all the more interesting to play."

=== Maternity of Anne Greenlaw ===
Upon the soap opera's revamp in 2000, part of the producers plan was to present a more community based setting with steady family links between characters. It was decided to introduce a daughter for Judy whom she had adopted out at birth, the character of Anne Greenlaw was created to serve this purpose. Upon her arrival Anne initially gets on the bad side of Judy with her portrayer - Emmeline Hawthorne stating; "I come along very bright-eyed and bushy-tailed, with a whole lot of ideas about how the old people shouldn’t be on the sleeping pills... I make the mistake about the old people and take the signs off their backs and one of them goes wandering. So Judy Brownlee automatically thinks I’m useless and I have to do all the terrible jobs, like cleaning up the sluice room and emptying the linen skips and doing tea rounds.” The adopted Anne then set out on a "standard soap opera story" to find her biological mother. Both the characters and the audience were shocked when it was discovered Anne's mother was none other than the head of nursing, Judy Brownlee. Part of the reason for the pairing, was that with the tense situation between characters, any situation could potentially be explosive. Despite a shaky start, the two bonded well and Judy was devastated when Anne was killed in a building collapse. She struggled to forgive Anne's husband Victor for the way he treated her.

== Reception ==
Rees found many people loved the character because she was loyal and tough, but also found abuse because of Judy's racist tendencies. Judy's storyline with Anne has been named as one of the best story lines to feature on the soap. Frances Grant of The New Zealand Herald, was surprised audiences were tuning in to watch Judy's relationship with Max over real life new stories.
