= Ruby and Rata =

- Directed by: Gaylene Preston
- Written by: Graeme Tetley
- Produced by: Gaylene Preston; Robin Laing
- Starring: Yvonne Lawley; Vanessa Rare; Lee Metekingi; Simon Barnett
- Cinematography: Leon Narbey
- Edited by: Paul Sutorius
- Music by: Jonathan Crayford
- Release date: 4 October 1990 (New Zealand)
- Running time: 109 minutes
- Country: New Zealand
- Language: English
- Budget: NZD $2 million
- Box office: NZD $355,000 (New Zealand)

Ruby and Rata is a 1990 New Zealand comedy-drama film, directed and produced by Gaylene Preston.

== Plot summary ==
Ruby (Yvonne Lawley) is an 83-year-old woman who has just failed her driving test and is worried about her ability to cope with day-to-day life at her age. She asks her nephew Buckle (Simon Barnett), posing as a real estate agent, to arrange to lease part of the house she owns to a potential housemate to assist her with various chores. The new tenant is Rata (Vanessa Rare)—a well-dressed, smooth-talking young woman of Māori descent who works for a large finance company. Once she has moved in, it becomes apparent that Rata is actually a cleaner at the firm, has a young son named Willie (Lee Metekingi), and is in trouble with social services over welfare payments. Rata is also hoping to make it big as a singer in a punk band, The Apocalypse, which is reliant on her accessing the supposed "fortune" of her new housemate/landlady to pay for sound equipment. An unusual relationship develops between Ruby, Rata and Willie, with each of them manipulating the others in some way, but forming a bond and dependence on each other.

== Cast ==
- Yvonne Lawley – Ruby
- Vanessa Rare – Rata
- Lee Metekingi – Willie
- Simon Barnett – Buckle

== Production ==
Ruby and Rata was filmed in and around the Auckland suburb of Mount Albert.

It was the second film made by Preston-Laing Productions (Gaylene Preston and Robin Laing), the first being the 1986 horror film Mr Wrong.

== Awards ==
Ruby and Rata won four awards at the 1990 NZ Film Awards: Best Editing, Best Soundtrack, Best Film Score and Best Performance (Male).
