= Iris (1984 film) =

- Directed by: Tony Isaac
- Written by: Keith Aberdein
- Produced by: Tony Isaac; John Barnett
- Starring: Helen Morse; Philip Holder; John Bach
- Cinematography: J Howard Anderson - assist James Bartle
- Edited by: Michael Horton sound = Graham Ridding
- Music by: John Charles
- Release date: November 10, 1984
- Running time: 90 min
- Country: New Zealand
- Language: English

Iris is a 1984 New Zealand television film. It is about Iris Wilkinson, known by her pen name, Robin Hyde. It contains two story streams, Iris's own life and a film inside a film, filmmakers making a film about Iris. This was the first major TVNZ drama production recorded as a single camera video production. Recorded on 1" video tape and edit on 2" tape for editing and release.

== Cast ==
- Helen Morse as Iris/Sammie
- Philip Holder as Dr. Tothill/Kelly
- John Bach as Mike
- Donogh Rees as Simone/Kate
- David Ashton as Harry/Laurence
- Elizabeth McRae as Augusta Wilkinson
- Roy Billing As John Wilkinson
- Navit Harmor as Iris at age 10
- Derek Challis as Self
- Katy Platt as Maggie

== Reception ==
Helen Martin in New Zealand film, 1912-1996 says "Australian actor Helen Morse is excellent in both roles. Iris's poetry and prose, voiced- over throughout the narrative, give a clear sense of her talent. The contemporary story is at times contrived, particularly in the set-piece discussions, but Iris's troubled life, haunted by loss and the unsuccessful search for love, is dramatised without sensationalism ."
