= Bree Hamilton =

Fictional character

- Shortland Street character
- Portrayed by: Rachael Blampied
- Duration: 2011–2014
- First appearance: 9 December 2011
- Last appearance: 4 February 2014
- Introduced by: Steven Zanoski (2011); Simon Bennett (2013)
In-universe information
- Other names: Bree Marsden
- Occupation: Surgical registrar
- Father: Tony
- Mother: Annette Freeman
- Half-sisters: Brooke Rolleston

Dr. Bree Hamilton (previously Marsden) is a fictional character on the New Zealand soap opera Shortland Street, portrayed by Rachael Blampied from December 2011 to September 2012. Blampied reprised the role in late 2013.

Created and written specifically for Blampied, Bree debuted as the illegitimate sister of established character, Brooke Freeman (Beth Allen). Envisioned to initially contrast her antagonistic sister, Bree developed into a manipulative and sociopathic villain whose antagonism greatly overpowered Brooke. Her storylines included getting to know Brooke, dating Vinnie Kruse (Pua Magasiva), revealing she was not a properly qualified surgeon, holding her mother hostage, stealing Brooke's identity and attempting to murder her after she had clearly lost her mind. Blampied described Bree's storyline as a "downward spiral" and researched intensely on personality disorders. Blampied and Allen shared a dressing room together to add realism to the onscreen partnership. Bree's return in 2013 saw her be part of the Christmas cliffhanger when she murdered a man to take his money.

Bree has been labelled a "hugely popular" character and her first stint saw a favourable reception with her final storyline which saw her steal Brooke's identity, being hailed as a highlight of the 2012 season. The episodes brought in huge ratings and Blampied's portrayal encouraged writers to restyle the character's exit storyline to allow a return.

== Creation and casting ==
Rachael Blampied had auditioned 5 times for Shortland Street, with her last being for the role of Zlata Waldheim. However Blampied was turned down every time as she looked too similar to one of the core actresses, Beth Allen (who portrayed Brooke Freeman). After she auditioned for the role of Zlata, producers decided to utilise their similarities and create the role of Bree – a sister for Brooke, specifically for her. Blampied received a call in mid-2011 asking if she was eager to accept the role. She was extremely pleased with the call, saying; "It's the best phone call an actor can wish for – that they're writing a part for you on a show you really want to be on. It was a complete surprise and totally out of the blue." The character was originally planned to appear nicer but end up being "badder" than Brooke. Blampied started filming her scenes in October 2011. Blampied found her first day of work similar to walking "into a beast" and although she was nervous, she found it was like "a family". In November TVNZ announced that a new addition would be arriving to Brooke's dysfunctional family, with Bree arriving on 9 December. Blampied enjoyed working alongside her screen sister, Allen and Pua Magasiva (who portrayed Brooke's boyfriend Vinnie), saying; "I've had some great scenes with Beth and Pua, which have been enormous fun as they're such generous actors and are heaps of fun to hang out with!" The character was originally envisioned to be killed off at the end of her stint, but producers were so impressed with Blampied that they rewrote the characters ending by sending her to a psychiatric hospital. Blampied was not aware as to what Bree was to endure throughout her stint but was informed that she was always going to leave after her initial storyline came to an end. She was sad to leave the soap but pleased with her exit, "I was sad to have to leave the show, but it's not a closed exit. One of the writers said to me on my last day, 'Well it's always good to have a crazy in the cupboard.'" Bree made her last appearance on 25 September 2012.

In 2013, Blampied was contacted by her agent informing her that producers wanted her to reprise her role of Bree. Beforehand she had been hearing rumors of the return but nothing official. She signed a "Major Guest" contract that would see her reprise her role late in the year. Blampied was pleased to be reunited with her onscreen sister Allen but believed Bree had certain standards to live up to after her first stint, "I'm very happy for her to return, but it's interesting coming back because there are expectations for Bree. She left very dramatically and I just hope everyone likes her homecoming." Bree made her reappearance on 25 November 2013.

== Storylines ==
Bree was born in 1983 and was the result of an affair between Brooke Freeman's (Beth Allen) mother, Annette (Louise Wallace) and her husband Grant's (Alan Lovell) best friend. Kicked out by Grant, Annette was forced to adopt Bree out to keep her family together. Bree's biological father died in a boat accident in 1993.

Bree tracked Brooke down and revealed they were sisters to a frosty reception. With help from Brooke's boyfriend, Vinnie Kruse (Pua Magasiva), Bree landed a job at the hospital alongside Brooke. However, after several icey interactions with her sister, Bree ended up dating Vinnie but started to suffer from her lack of self-confidence at work. Vinnie soon discovered Bree had only passed her medical exams by sleeping with her tutor and they broke up. Bree started to blackmail staff to keep her job but was suspended when she nearly killed a patient. Bree was devastated when Annette returned and admitted she had wanted to abort Bree, resulting in Bree holding Annette captive, drugging and, mentally torturing her. Bree lost her job and after working as a medical supplies salesman, began sleeping with Kevin Johns (David Van Horn) under the identity of Brooke. When Brooke discovered the fraud, Bree lost her mind and attempted to murder her, knocking her out and hiding her body in a storage container. The hospital staff soon realised Bree legitimately believed herself to be her sister and once Brooke was discovered, Bree was sectioned to a mental health ward. Bree was relocated to a different city where Brooke continued to visit her.

Bree was released from her psychiatric hospital and returned to Ferndale after Brooke's husband Boyd (Sam Bunkall) plead to her to donate a kidney to a sick Brooke. It soon turned out Bree had no intention of donating and blackmailed Boyd for thousands of dollars in exchange for the operation. Nonetheless, Bree bailed and Brooke paid her off to leave Ferndale. Bree returned claiming she had suffered another psychotic episode, though it was soon clear she had in fact murdered Travis Corfield (John Tui) and had returned to steal his money. Bree eventually confessed this to Brooke and tried to escape, only for her own sister to hand her in to the police.

== Character development ==
=== Characterisation ===
Upon arrival, Bree was shown as a polite and sensitive, well trained doctor, sharply contrasting her sister Brooke (Beth Allen). The character made friends quickly and appeared overly generous. However, as the character developed, it was revealed she too had a nasty side and was a lot more similar to Brooke than originally thought. Blampied enjoyed playing the personality change, labelling it as; "making a great descent" and stating; "It's a massive change from how the character arrived and through her relationship with Brooke and Vinnie, it goes haywire. I'm looking forward to the challenge of how to justify those decisions she makes." Bree's manipulative persona was blamed on her "tumultuous upbringing" which saw her be fostered by several families before being adopted at 10. As a result, she suffered from self-consciousness. Blampied enjoyed playing such a complex character, stating: "It's definitely a lot more interesting than always being the nice guy because you do get to say and do some things you would never do and it's the furthest thing from my personal character and demeanor, so it is quite a turnaround." Blampied went on to explain her mixed opinions of Bree: "I obviously don't agree with what she's doing. Sometimes I read the script and go, 'Why are you doing that? There are a hundred easier ways to do that.' I have days where I really don't like Bree and what she's doing." The character has been described as "conniving" and "scheming". Blampied did not at first realise how manipulative Bree was to become and when she realised the extent to which writers were pushing her antagonistic characterisation, she described it as "daunting". However Blampied had been warned, "Someone told me, if you're on Shortland Street, always play your character as if you have a secret – because you will have a secret!" To portray Bree's penultimate breakdown, Blampied researched borderline personality disorder and severe narcissism. Blampied enjoyed how Bree was portrayed in her final scene, stating: "We don't often see Bree's vulnerable side side and when we do she's still being manipulative and deceitful ... I really like the way she ends up because there is an element of real sadness to it ... when she realises how wrong she's been." Blampied cared for her character and hoped for an uneventful future for Bree, "I'd like to see her get well, hold down a job and maybe even get into a relationship. Life is hard for her and always has been. I care about Bree and I know that sounds like a weird thing to say." Describing Bree upon her return, Blampied stated, "She's still mentally very fragile, and her manipulative tendencies are most definitely still at the surface", but affirmed, "she's a lot more aware now though".

=== Brooke Freeman ===
The character was created as the sister of established character, Brooke Freeman (Beth Allen) due to Blampied's and Allen's physical similarity. Bree first appeared on the show when Vinnie Kruse (Pua Magasiva) mistook her for his girlfriend – Brooke. Although Bree tried to get on with Brooke, the feelings were not mutual and Brooke struggled to accept her sister. Whilst the two characters were getting to know each other, so too were their actresses; Blampied and Beth Allen and the two shared a dressing room. Blampied herself was an only child, but found working alongside Allen reassuring, "I was kind of getting to know Beth in an almost sisterly way at the same time Bree and Brooke were getting to know each other. So it's kind of worked for me." After Vinnie left Brooke for her behaviour towards Bree, he and Bree started an affair, creating a love triangle between the sisters. Bree revealed to Vinnie that her qualifications as a surgeon were dodgy and alerted Brooke. However instead of deepening the rival between the two, it only forced the two closer together. Blampied explained the situation stating; "Instead of throwing Bree under a bus, Brooke decides she quite likes that Bree has a big secret, because it makes her more human – or more like she is ... Brooke decides she is going to take Bree under her wing and help her out of the mess. In many ways Bree becomes Brooke's little protege. I think they've both had the chance to let their guard down with one another. Now that Brooke has seen Bree at her lowest – desperate and vulnerable – it has endeared her to Brooke."

"They sort of have a funny relationship. While Bree really wants to get to know her sister and really love her, there is, of course, that jealousy that Brooke was the sister that was kept."

— Blampied on Bree and Brooke's relationship

In April, the sisters decided to flat together but trouble arose with Brooke's flatmate's Bella Cooper (Amelia Reid) and Luke Durville (Gerald Urquhart) refusing to move out. Brooke ended up manipulating the two into relationship problems to get them out but ultimately helped the two and was at odds with Bree's antagonistic view of the couple. Brooke and Bree's mother Annette (Louise Wallace) returned in July 2012 and the cast enjoyed portraying the relationship between the mother and her illegitimate daughter, with Wallace stating: "It's good looking at the back story and what happened in our relationship and where it all went wrong, why she hates me and why I don't give a rats arse about her. We are deeply flawed." She went on to state that Annette would have never; "anticipated having to deal with this part of her past, so it throws her a real curveball when she arrives and discovers Bree has firmly entrenched herself in Brooke's life" and that; "In some ways, Bree and Annette are more similar than Brooke and Annette, which really riles Annette." Following her lack of respect from Annette, Bree held her captive and mentally tortured her. She decided that life would be easier as Brooke and started to adopt her personality, "All she really wants is acceptance and love and, as we're seeing now, she's finding a way for that to happen by adopting Brooke's persona." The storyline was compared to films: Fatal Attraction and Single White Female, though Blampied tried not to be influenced by them. The storyline climaxed in Bree, under the identity of Brooke, attempting to murder her sister and hiding her body in a storage container. Vinnie realised something was wrong and a search party soon found Brooke. Bree tried to escape but was mown down by a forklift. After finally accepting what she had done was wrong, Bree tried to make up with Brooke but ended up being sectioned to a psychiatric ward.

Bree's return in November 2013 saw her arriving to see Brooke in what Blampied described as, "her time of need". Bree returned to Ferndale after Brooke fell ill and required a kidney transplant. Blampied believed that there was genuine feelings between the sisters, "she really does care for Brooke but at the same time, she is self-preserving. She just does things in strange ways."

== Reception ==
Bree has been described as a "hugely popular" character despite her villainous characteristics and Blampied expected a lot more "hate". Television New Zealand listed Bree, alongside sister Brooke (Beth Allen), as some of the soap's most memorable "bad girls". Bree's introduction to the soap was named as a conclusion to a drama filled year for Brooke. Louise Wallace predicted the scenes where her character Annette Freeman, was held captive by Bree, would captivate the audience, she stated: "It’s great stuff ... I think that there will be a few water cooler moments when people say, 'Hey, did you see Shorty last night?’" Television blogger Chris Philpot disliked the character of Bree and jokingly offered to sacrifice his least favoured characters – Harry Warner and Daniel Potts, in order for her to leave. The storyline that saw Bree lose her mind has been named as one of the show's most "dramatic breakdowns".

In the Ferndale Talk Best of 2013 awards, Bree was voted the 3rd best character to return throughout the year by fans but also placed 3rd for the character fans wished to get rid of. She also placed 3rd for "Most Delusional Character".
