= Vanessa Rare =

New Zealand actress, screenwriter and director

- Education: University of Auckland
- Occupations: Actress, screenwriter, director
- Years active: 1990–present

Vanessa Rare is a New Zealand film and television actress, screenwriter and director. She is of Ngāti Pu, Ngāti Porou, Ngāti Pukenga and Ngāpuhi iwi descent.

== Career ==
Rare's screen debut was as Rata in the 1990 comedy film Ruby and Rata. She has acted in a number of movies, as well as holding an extended role on the soap opera Shortland Street as Te Hana Hudson from 2001 to 2005.

In the 1990s, Rare studied literature and television and film studies at the University of Auckland and began to write and direct television series and short films.

== Recognition ==
In 2003, Rare was nominated for Best Script, Single Episode of a Drama Series or Serial for Mataku at the New Zealand Television Awards. In 2014, she was nominated for Best Supporting Actress for The Z-Nail Gang at the New Zealand Film Awards.

== Filmography ==
Year	Title	Role	Genre	Notes
1990	Ruby and Rata	Rata	Feature film	
1991	Te Rua	Helen Marangai	Feature film	
1997	Koa means "Joy"	Director and screenwriter	Short film	
2001–2005	Shortland Street	Te Hana Hudson	Television series	
2002–2005	Mataku	Screenwriter	Television series	
2003	Pikowae	Director and screenwriter	Short film	
2014	The Z-Nail Gang	Aunty	Feature film	
2020	The Sounds	Pania Cottle	Series	
2023	The Brokenwood Mysteries	Mama Sass	Series 9 Episode 6	
2023	The Gone	Wiki Huia	Series	
