= Emily Robins =

New Zealand actress and singer

- Born: Emily Iris Robins; 21 May 1989 (age 35); London, United Kingdom
- Occupation: Actress/singer
- Years active: 1999–present
- Height: 5'3 (1.60 m)

Emily Iris Robins (born 21 May 1989) is a British-born New Zealand actress and singer. She was born to Danny Robins and Susan Robins. She is known for her role in the popular TV2 soap opera Shortland Street as Claire Simone Solomon (2004–2007), and for her role in the popular FOX 8 teen drama, SLiDE, where she portrayed Scarlett Carlyle. She was born in London, but raised in New Zealand. She grew up in Orewa. She was involved with Centre Stage Theatre (an Orewa Theatre company).

She gained her place in Shortland Street by auditioning at high school, winning the part of Claire. For her work, Emily received a TV Guide 'Best on the Box' People's Choice Award in 2005. She left the show in July 2007, when her character was found dead in a skip, by TK Samuels (Benjamin Mitchell) and Mark Weston (Tim Foley).

In 2007, she appeared in a stage performance of Arthur Miller's The Crucible, in Auckland, New Zealand, where she portrayed the character of Susannah.

In 2008 Robins was cast as the lead in the Australian children's television program The Elephant Princess, playing protagonist Alexandra Wilson. The show ran for two seasons. The Elephant Princess had its name changed to The Rock Princess in the United Kingdom. In 2011 she was cast as Scarlett Carlyle in the Australian teen drama series SLiDE.

Robins played the character of Toni in the 2016 TV2 drama series Filthy Rich.

== Filmography ==
Television series
Year	Title	Role	Notes
2004–07	Shortland Street	Claire Solomon	Main role
2008–11	The Elephant Princess	Alex Wilson	Main role, 52 episodes
2011	SLiDE	Scarlett Carlyle	Main role, 10 episodes
2015	Three Kings	Sugar	Short Film
2016	Filthy Rich	Toni	Recurring role

== Awards ==
Year	Award	Film	Result
2005	TV Guide Best on the Box People's Choice Award for Rising Star	Shortland Street	Won
