= Victor Kahu =

- Shortland Street character
- Portrayed by: Calvin Tuteao
- Duration: 2000–04
- First appearance: September 2000
- Last appearance: Episode 3140; 25 December 2004
- Introduced by: Simon Bennett
In-universe information
- Occupation: Chief Executive Officer of Shortland Street Hospital (2002–03)
- Father: Kahikatea Kahu
- Mother: Makana Kahu
- Sisters: Te Hana Hudson; Bernice Kahu
- Wife: Diana Copeland (until 1985); Anne Greenlaw (2002–03)
- Sons: Nelson Copeland
- Daughters: Jay Copeland
- Grandfathers: Kahakatane Kahu
- Uncles: Arthur Kahu
- Aunts: Liz Kahu
- Nephews: Tama Hudson
- Nieces: Mihi Hudson

Dr. Victor Katea Kahu is a fictional character on the New Zealand soap opera Shortland Street who was portrayed by Calvin Tuteao from late 2000 to Christmas Day 2004.

Introduced during a period of change in the production of Shortland Street, Victor and his extended family were an increase in both Māori and working class demography; the decision to introduce such a stereotype viewed shamefully by Producers retrospectively. His storylines often emphasised his commitment toward Māori healthcare and he soon became a central character dealing with large story arcs featuring many of the show's large cast. These included helping his girlfriend overcome rape, becoming involved with gangs, being framed for murder twice, launching a euthanasia cover up scandal and discovering his wife was cheating on him with his son. The character departed on Christmas Day 2004 with girlfriend - Donna Heka (Stephanie Tauevihi) following his nephews wedding.

Playing a large part of the soap opera's first few years in the 21st century, the character's storylines and relationships received a generally mixed response. Victor's major romance storyline saw a lukewarm reception with he and Anne's (Emmeline Hawthorne) wedding day receiving praise whereas the coupling itself was criticised.

== Creation and casting ==
Calvin Tuteao was cast as Victor and made his debut in 2000, he previously appeared on the soap in 1997 as the gang member Carlin. Tuteao stated, "Acting's not work to me. I always have fun on set. You get looked after, meet some good people and have a laugh," and was pleased to be playing a "good guy". One of the purposes of the character was to portray community health and Māori based healthcare on the medical based programme. The character survived the show's revamp throughout 2000 to 2001 and his onscreen family was introduced in 2001, with sister Te Hana and her family arriving. Victor's own children, Nelson and Jay Copeland later arrived as part of the core cast. Victor departed the show on Christmas Day 2004.

== Storylines ==
Victor was employed by the clinic in 2000 and started to date Sofia Martinez (Lena Cruz). However the two broke up and Victor started to date Kate (Rebecca Hobbs) who was raped shortly into the relationship by her obsessive friend - Eamon (Neill Rea). Victor stopped Kate from suicide and helped her recover from the traumatizing event however Kate left him and Victor started sleeping with Donna Heka (Stephanie Tauevihi). The romance with Donna didn't last and Victor became CEO. Victor briefly dated Mere Jonhnson (Caroline McLaughlin) before leaving her for young nurse, Anne Greenlaw (Emmeline Hawthorne). The two soon got engaged and Victor saved his niece - Mihi (Quantrelle King) from a gang led by Kurt Matakoare (Gordon Hatfield). Victor and Anne married but the ceremony was ruined when Victor was arrested for a murder Kurt committed. He was eventually released and Kurt was arrested.

Victor and Anne decided to adopt the baby of Victor's teenage nephew - Tama (David Wikaira-Paul) but Victor discovered Anne was having an affair with his son Nelson Copeland (Quinton Hita) and the marriage was over. He started a short lived affair with Li Mei Chen (Li Ming Hu). Victor resigned as CEO following the revelation he had covered up Geoff's (Andrew Laing) frequent use of euthanasia, however found himself a suspect when Geoff was murdered. He turned back to Donna for support and the two started a relationship following Anne's tragic death. Victor's estranged daughter - Jay (Jaime Passier-Armstrong) arrived and the two finally reconciled however Victor was arrested for Geoff's death and was found guilty by a jury despite evidence proving he was with Li Mei at the time of Geoff's death. The true killer - Dominic Thompson (Shane Cortese) eventually confessed to the murder as he died and Victor was released. He departed with Donna to live in Australia following Tama's wedding on Christmas Day 2004. Victor phoned Jay in 2006 to decline the invitation to her civil union as he did not believe it was a real wedding. In 2007 Chris (Michael Galvin) phoned Victor to tell him of Jay's murder. In 2008 Donna and Victor sent Chris a card to express their sadness that they could not attend Toni's (Laura Hill) funeral.

== Character development ==
=== Relationship with Anne Greenlaw ===
In 2002 Victor and Anne Greenlaw embarked on a relationship. There was huge contrast between the middle aged head of hospital and the young nurse, but Tuteao praised the relationship saying; "Love knows no age, no colour ... She sort of makes him want to be a better man. Or try to be." The two got engaged despite Anne developing feelings for Victor's son Nelson, who was the same age. Despite not acting on her feelings, Anne continued to grow attracted to Nelson as the wedding drew closer. The filming of the wedding meant three days of filming in cold conditions whilst onscreen it was to be a picturesque ceremony that was to be the soap's biggest wedding since Gina and Leonard's in 1993. Tuteao enjoyed the experience saying; "Had loads of extras, making heaps of noise out here — the place was rocking." The two married but after the vows Victor was arrested for murder after being framed by nemesis Kurt (Gordon Hatfield). However Anne did end up having an affair with Nelson and when Victor found out, he was infuriated and ended the relationship. When Anne was crushed by a collapsing building in the 2003 cliffhanger, Tuteao agreed that the two were too different, stating; "They're not really compatible, I suppose. They're totally different. Maybe he just wanted a younger woman, a trophy wife. But I think Victor would miss her, too, if she dies." When Anne died, despite having moved on to Donna, Victor was devastated and was forced to reevaluate his life.

== Reception ==
Victor has been described as a "favourite" character. His wedding to Anne was labelled "memorable". Frances Grant of The New Zealand Herald was critical of the character and his storylines, calling the romance storyline with Anne; silly and hoping Kahu would be revealed as the murder of Geoff so that he would be written off. She later called Victor "immensely unlikeable" and criticized his facial hair. The arrival of Victor and his son Nelson was praised in relation to Māori presence, with Nelson's portrayer Quinton Hita stating; "I have to tip my hat to the show. It's gone a long way down the track in trying to present Māori in a positive light. And also, I suppose, trying to naturalise the contribution that Māori make to our society." Producer Simon Bennett reflected on the introduction of Victor and his family in a less positive lens, "With the best will in the world the intention to introduce a down on their luck Maori family who moved from the country to the city came across as mawkish and somewhat PC in flavour." The storyline that saw Dominic Thompson frame Victor as Geoff's murderer has gone down as iconic. Michael Galvin (Dr. Chris Warner) highlighted the episode where Chris and Victor participated in a hospital musical as the lowlight of his career on the soap. The episode aired on September 12, 2001 and was subsequently the lowest rated episode to ever air. Victor and Anne's relationship was also criticized, being called "bizarre" and "not right".
