= List of Shortland Street characters introduced in 2024 =

The following is a list of characters that first appeared in the New Zealand soap opera Shortland Street in 2024, by order of first appearance.

== Phil Grayson ==
Phil Grayson
- Shortland Street character
- Portrayed by: Jane Wills
- Duration: 2024—
- First appearance: 5 February 2024
- Introduced by: Oliver Driver

Phil is a surgeon who joined Shortland Street in early 2024 alongside Ihaia Stone who she was in an open relationship with the cracks begin to show when she becomes pregnant the two ended up in argument after disagreeing about the baby where she tragically slipped and fell down a set of stairs, resulting in the loss of the baby. Despite her commitment to Ihaia she began to develop romantic feelings for Harper Whitley. The two started a secret affair. Eventually, Ihaia left Ferndale began pushing Harper to choose: to leave Drew and her kids or her. she then begins a relationship with Vili Unbeknownst to him she continue the affair with Harper. By the end of the year Drew and Vili discover their secret affair after finding texts on her phone,Vili ends things with her and The truth about the affair destroyed Drew and Harper’s marriage. they reconnect after she looks after Drew after a suicide attempt and founds out Harper accepted a job from New York and she and Drew decided to leave Ferndale together she was devasted when Harper died on the operating table after her motorbike crashed. In 2025 she begins a relationship with Maeve Mullens after her marriage to Nicole was over after ending things with Maeve she begins a fling with Vili unbeknownst to her Maeve is giving her another chance but shocked to see Vili came out of her bedroom. A few weeks later she and Hendrix went to Mollys together and ended up having sex in the bathroom behind Poppy's back. During the hospital’s virus lockdown, Phil becomes trapped in a lift alongside Libby, Drew, Katie, and several others. Tensions escalate when Katie, in a distressed state, seizes a screwdriver and stabs Phil, accusing her of taking her children away she undergoes a successful operation and makes a full recovery. In the 2025 cliffhanger she and Drew share a kiss he then tells her that he can’t, after this the two see the helicopter explode. In March 2026 Drew and Phil begin a relationship after going back and forward however it was short-lived after Drew tell her he is leaving for Amsterdam with Boyd they break up and he leaves. she begins clashing with new register Izzy DoveOn the day of their surgical exam Izzy locks herself in her room and they both miss their exam she later smashes her car with a rock Phil passes her exam and is promoted to Consultant on the 1st of July. After Phil passes her consultancy exams, she throws herself a celebration party he slepts with CEO Paul Cremorne. the feud with Izzy continues after she reports her to HR for bulling.she later has a meeting with Alexander Dove Izzy's father the meeting initially goes well as he understands how his daughter can be but she oversteps by saying what Izzy is really like this angers him and insults her disappointed by Phils uneven work ethic, inability to thrive in her career and string of failed relationships. decided to not move forward with the complaint.

== Nazar Arshad ==
Nazar Arshad
- Shortland Street character
- Portrayed by: Mo Nasir
- Duration: 2024–present
- First appearance: 5 February 2024
- Introduced by: Oliver Driver
In-universe information
- Occupation: Doctor
- Spouse: Monique Strutter

Nazar Arshad, played by Mo Nasir, made his first appearance on 5 February 2024. Nazar is the first character of Pakistani descent.

== Bonnie Kawiti ==
Bonnie Kawiti
- Shortland Street character
- Portrayed by: Acushla-Tara Kupe
- Duration: 2024–present
- First appearance: 23 April 2024
- Introduced by: Oliver Driver
In-universe information
- Father: Emmett Whitman
- Mother: Anahera Kawiti
- Daughters: Karamea Kawiti
- Grandfathers: John Whitman

Bonnie Kawiti, played by Acushla-Tara Kupe, made her first appearance on 23 April 2024.

== Karamea Kawiti ==
Karamea Kawiti
- Shortland Street character
- Portrayed by: Boh Allan
- Duration: 2024–present
- First appearance: 23 April 2024
- Introduced by: Oliver Driver
In-universe information
- Mother: Bonnie Kawiti
- Grandfathers: Emmett Whitman
- Grandmothers: Anahera Kawiti
- Other relatives: John Whitman

Karamea Kawiti, played by Boh Allan, made her first appearance on 23 April 2024.

== Aiden Archer ==
Aiden Archer
- Shortland Street character
- Portrayed by: Conan O'Brien
- Duration: 2024
- Appears on: 12 December 2024
- Introduced by: Oliver Driver

Aiden Archer appeared for a one-scene guest appearance in late 2024, played by American comedian and talk-show host Conan O'Brien. O'Brien filmed his scene whilst visiting New Zealand for an international travel show Conan O'Brien Must Go in September 2024, with Producer Oliver Driver describing him as a "joy to have on the show" and hoping he would return.

Following the resignation of Hospital acting-Head of Surgery Boyd Rolleston (Sam Bunkall), Chris Warner (Michael Galvin) learned his long-time "frenemy" Aiden Archer was arriving in New Zealand to cover his surgeries. The two reconnected at the hospital where Aiden made it clear he took the job whilst briefly visiting the country for a romance to add to his nickname of "Dr. Love". After reconnecting, they returned to work with Aiden immediately flirting with a patient's mother.

The cameo was well received and described on Radio New Zealand as being "crafted to near perfection" and despite being "bizarre and hilarious" it was apparent "O'Brien was game to deliver whatever was written on the page - and it's equally clear the Shortland Street writers had an absolute field day." Tara Ward of The Spinoff described Aiden as "deliciously absurd" and despite having only "lasted two minutes ... it was powerful enough to destabilise everything Shortland Street holds dear." His persona as "Dr. Love" was said to challenge Chris Warner's existing title.
