= List of Shortland Street characters introduced in 2023 =

The following is a list of characters that first appeared in the New Zealand soap opera Shortland Street in 2023, by order of first appearance.

== Emmett Whitman ==
Emmett Whitman
- Shortland Street character
- Portrayed by: Stephen Lovatt
- Duration: 2023–present
- First appearance: 23 January 2023
- Introduced by: Oliver Driver
In-universe information
- Occupation: Consultant
- Father: John Whitman
- Sisters: Shavaughn Whitman
- Children: Bonnie Kawiti
- Granddaughters: Karamea Kawiti

Emmett Whitman, played by Stephen Lovatt made his first appearance in 2023. Lovatt has disputed his character being labelled a villain.

== Selina To'a ==
Selina To'a
- Shortland Street character
- Portrayed by: Bella Kalolo-Suraj
- Duration: 2023–present
- First appearance: 22 May 2023
- Introduced by: Oliver Driver
In-universe information
- Occupation: Nurse
- Brothers: Viliami To'a
- Children: Junior To'a

Selina To'a, played by Bella Kalolo-Suraj made his first appearance in 2023.

== Sage Stewart ==
Sage Stewart
- Shortland Street character
- Portrayed by: Peter Burman
- Duration: 2023–present
- First appearance: 4 December 2023
- Introduced by: Oliver Driver
In-universe information
- Occupation: Nurse
- Mother: Fran Stewart

Sage Stewart, played by Peter Burman made his first appearance in 2023. He is a nurse. He is LGBTQ.

== Stella Reihana ==
Stella Reihana
- Shortland Street character
- Portrayed by: Tatum Warren-Ngata
- Duration: 2023–2024
- First appearance: 2023
- Last appearance: 2024
- Introduced by: Oliver Driver
In-universe information
- Occupation: Surgeon

Stella Reihana, played by Tatum Warren-Ngata made his first appearance in 2023. She is a young surgeon.

== Quinn Cox ==
Quinn Cox
- Shortland Street character
- Portrayed by: Clementine Mills
- Duration: 2023
- First appearance: 1 May 2023
- Last appearance: 16 June 2023
- Introduced by: Oliver Driver
In-universe information
- Occupation: Registrar

Quinn Cox, played by Clementine Mills, made her first appearance in 2023. She is a young surgeon. She is LGBTQ.

== Parker Dawson ==
Parker Dawson
- Shortland Street character
- Portrayed by: Aidan O’Malley
- Duration: 2023–2024
- First appearance: 2023
- Last appearance: 2024
- Introduced by: Oliver Driver
In-universe information
- Occupation: Registrar

Parker Dawson, played by Aidan O’Malley, appeared from 2023 to 2024. He is a young surgeon. He is a registrar.

== Noah Forrester ==
Noah Forrester
- Shortland Street character
- Portrayed by: Ariki Turner
- Duration: 2023
- First appearance: 2023
- Last appearance: 2023
- Introduced by: Oliver Driver
In-universe information
- Occupation: Junior surgeon

Noah Forrester, played by Ariki Turner, first appeared in 2023. He is a young surgeon. He hails from a Pacific Island village.

== Britt Adams ==
Britt Adams
- Shortland Street character
- Portrayed by: Madeleine Adams
- Duration: 2023
- First appearance: 2023
- Last appearance: 2023
- Introduced by: Oliver Driver
In-universe information
- Occupation: Junior surgeon

Britt Adams, played by Madeleine Adams, first appeared in 2023. She is a young surgeon.
