= Rawiri Paratene =

New Zealand actor and filmmaker

Rawiri Paratene CNZM
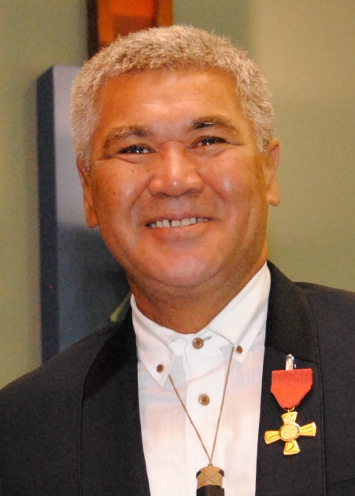
- Paratene in 2013
- Born: Peter David Broughton; 1953 or 1954 (age 71–72); Motukaraka, Hokianga, New Zealand
- Occupation: Actor
- Relatives: Marama Davidson (daughter)

Peter David Broughton CNZM, generally known as Rawiri Paratene, is a New Zealand stage and screen actor, director and writer. He is known for his acting roles in Whale Rider (2002) and The Insatiable Moon (2010).

== Biography ==
Paratene was born at Motukaraka, near Kohukohu, Hokianga, New Zealand, and is of Ngāpuhi descent. He grew up in the south Auckland suburb of Ōtara, and attended Hillary College as David Broughton, the English form of his name. Paratene's parents were Boyd Alex Broughton and Patricia Charlotte Hancy.

Paratene initially struggled with reading and writing at school, but went on to be the first Māori graduate of the New Zealand Drama School. He graduated in 2005 with a Bachelor of Performing Arts (Acting).

As a young student in the 1970s, Paratene was a member of Ngā Tamatoa, an activist organisation which fought for Māori rights, land, language and culture. Paratene was president of the Wellington chapter, and was one of those who presented the 1972 Te reo Māori petition to parliament. Today, working in the arts, Paratene aspires to have more Māori stories on film.

== Career ==
=== Theatre ===
Paratene was selected as a Shakespeare's Globe International Actor's Fellow in 2007. Paratene is an actor, director and writer and appeared as Friar Lawrence in the 2009 London Globe Theatre production of Romeo and Juliet.

The New Zealand Festival commissioned Paratene and Murray Lynch to write a play called Blue Smoke that premiered in 2000. It is set in the 1950s and is a musical featuring music from the era. The title of the play is also the title of a famous song Blue Smoke, which was the first record wholly produced in New Zealand and became a hit in the United States.

In 2014, Paratene joined the cast of the London Globe Theatre's two-year world tour of Hamlet, visiting 205 countries. He was the only non-British based actor in the cast.

Paratene's swan song production is Peter Paka Paratene directed by Tainui Tukiwaho, presented in 2021 at Te Pou Theatre in Auckland and the Kia Mau Festival.

=== Film ===
- Arriving Tuesday (1986) – Riki
- Footrot Flats: The Dog's Tale (1986) – Rangi (voice)
- Rapa-Nui (1994) – Priest
- What Becomes of the Broken Hearted? (1999) – Mulla Rota
- Whale Rider (2002) – Koro
- The Legend of Johnny Lingo (2003) – Malio Chief
- Man-Thing (2005) – Peter Horn
- The Insatiable Moon (2010) – Arthur

=== Television ===
Paratene's selection as the University of Otago's Burn's Fellow for 1983 was based on his television work as writer, director, and actor. During that year he wrote Erua (1988), which won him the New Zealand Film and Television Award for Best Writer in 1989, and the teleplay/screenplay Dead Certs (1995), for which he received the New Zealand Film and Television Award for Best Actor in 1996.

==== Selected appearances ====
- Play School
- Joe and Koro
- Xena: Warrior Princess – Tazere (Season 6, Episode 5: Legacy)
- Shortland Street – Joe Hudson
- Golden Boy - Bertie (Seasons 1 & 2)

== Personal life and politics ==
On 18 September 2008, the Green Party announced that Paratene was standing as their candidate for Maungakiekie in the 2008 election.

He is the father of Marama Davidson, who became the Green Party co-leader on 8 April 2018. She became an MP in 2015 when Russel Norman resigned. She had previously stood for the Green Party in the 2013 Ikaroa-Rāwhiti by-election and the 2014 general election.

== Honours and awards ==
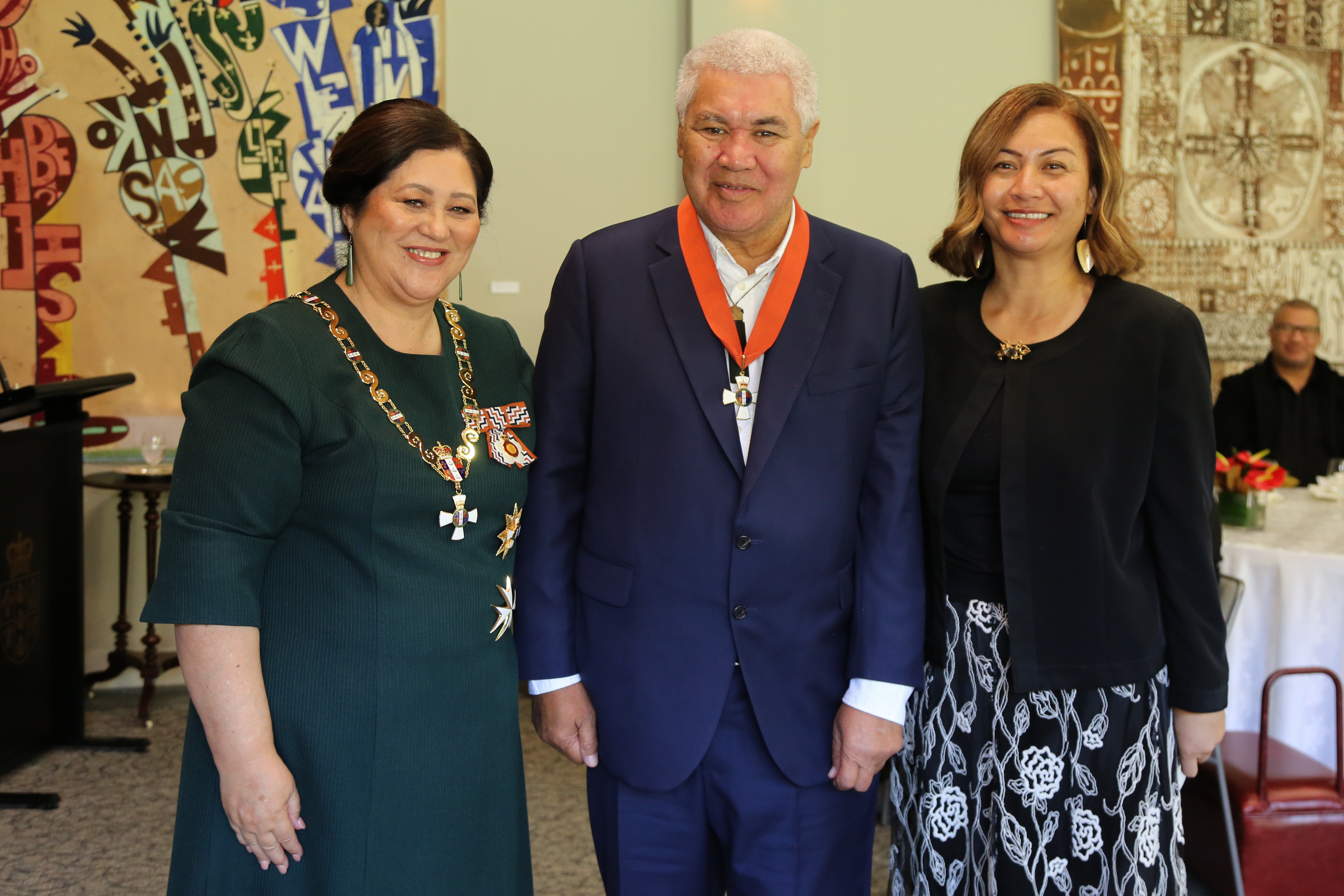
Paratene, after his investiture as a Companion of the New Zealand Order of Merit by the governor-general, Dame Cindy Kiro, at Government House, Auckland, on 28 May 2022. At right is Paratene's daughter, Marama Davidson.

- 2021 – Companion of the New Zealand Order of Merit, for services to Māori, film and theatre, in the 2022 New Year Honours
- 2012 – Officer of the New Zealand Order of Merit in the 2013 New Year Honours for services to film, television and theatre
- 2011 – Aotearoa Film & Television Award for Best Actor in a Feature Film – The Insatiable Moon (Arthur)
- 1996 – NZ Film & Television Award for Best Actor – Dead Cert (Hare)
- 1983 – Winner of the Robert Burns Fellowship
- 1980 – Winner Mobil Radio Award for 'Proper Channels' Radio Play (Production)
- 1980 – Winner Mobil Radio Award for 'Proper Channels' Radio Play (Writing)
- 1976 – Winner of the Māori Writers' Award
