= Tama Hudson =

- Shortland Street character
- Portrayed by: David Wikaira-Paul
- Duration: 2001–2006
- First appearance: 6 May 2001
- Last appearance: 18 April 2006
- Created by: Jason Daniel
- Introduced by: Simon Bennett
In-universe information
- Father: Joe Hudson
- Mother: Te Hana Hudson
- Sisters: Mihi Hudson
- Wife: Shannon Te Ngaru (2004–)
- Sons: Te Ngakau Hudson
- Daughters: Rangimarie Hudson
- Grandfathers: Kahikatea Kahu
- Grandmothers: Makana Kahu
- Uncles: Victor Kahu
- Aunts: Anne Kahu
- First cousins: Nelson Copeland; Jay Copeland; Whetu Hudson; Eti Kawaka

Tama Hudson is a fictional character on the New Zealand soap opera Shortland Street who was portrayed by David Wikaira-Paul from 2001 to 2006.

== Creation and casting ==
In 2000 an Australian consultant made several large changes to the show that would see a more working class hospital portrayed. Tama, his parents Joe and Te Hana and sister Mihi were created because of this. As part of the revamp, producers wished for a more community based cast with established family links, mimicking the past presence of the Warner and McKenna families. Sixteen year old David Wikaira-Paul was cast in the role. In 2006 the character was axed alongside 5 other characters as part of a revamp. The revamp was an attempt to create a culturally proportional cast after the exit of the only Pacific Islander, Pua Magasiva.

== Storylines ==
Tama arrived alongside his family but it was soon clear to his friend Delphi (Anna Hutchison) that Tama enjoyed music a lot more than he did playing rugby as his father Joe (Rawiri Paratene) wished. Tama began to secretly date his sister's best friend Shannon Te Ngaru (Amber Curreen) and the two started a physical relationship that landed Shannon pregnant. The two decided to adopt their baby out at birth and reconciled, but the baby boy died shortly after birth and the relationship fell apart. However, when Shannon attempted suicide and Tama nearly died in a building collapse, the two decided to commit to a future together ad got engaged. Despite appearing happy, whilst Tama was away Shannon started an affair with Vinnie Kruse (Pua Magasiva) and the two later broke up only to reconcile in the aftermath of Shannon supporting Tama through his uncle Victor's (Calvin Tutaeo) trial and false imprisonment for the murder of Geoff Greenlaw (Andrew Laing) and got engaged once again, much to the chagrin of Te Hana (Vanessa Rare). After getting in trouble for assaulting the true murderer, Dominic Thompson (Shane Cortese), Tama and Shannon married on Christmas Day with Victor, who'd been released after Dominic confessed to murdering Geoff as he died earlier and replaced the missing wedding rings with beach shells. The two took in Tama's troublesome cousin Eti Kawaka (Isaac Bell) and Shannon again fell pregnant, giving birth to Rangimarie Hudson (Mia Curreen-Poko) in May. However, it soon became clear Shannon was unhappy and she again strayed from Tama with his cousin Whetu (Taungaroa Emile) and the two separated for good. The separation turned nasty with Shannon shacking up with Whetu for good. Whetu began stirring up trouble leading to Tama calling Te Hana back from up north to help him out. Realising the two outside parties were causing nothing but distractions, with Te Hana trying to seek custody of Rangimarie for herself and with Whetu demanding $25,000 from his threeway agreement with Tama and their cousin Jay Copeland (Jamie Passier-Armstrong) to be bought out of his share of the family's Kahu Kai business, Tama and Shannon settled their issues independently, with the two agreeing on who kept which items for whom and ended up on agreeing to Shannon being sole guardian of Rangimarie. Tama left Ferndale to live with his family up north.

== Reception ==
Producer Simon Bennett did not enjoy the introduction of the Hudson family, stating: "With the best will in the world the intention to introduce a down on their luck Maori family who moved from the country to the city came across as mawkish and somewhat PC in flavour." Playing Tama reportedly earned Wikaira-Paul huge popularity, especially amongst young audiences and he received the most fan mail. Parents of the young viewers reportedly hoped everything would work out for Tama. Tama and Shannon were also a hugely popular couple with fans constantly hoping the two would have a happy ending. The love triangle storyline between Tama, Shannon and Vinnie was singled out as a favourite romance storyline from the 2004 season.
