= Donogh Rees =

New Zealand actress

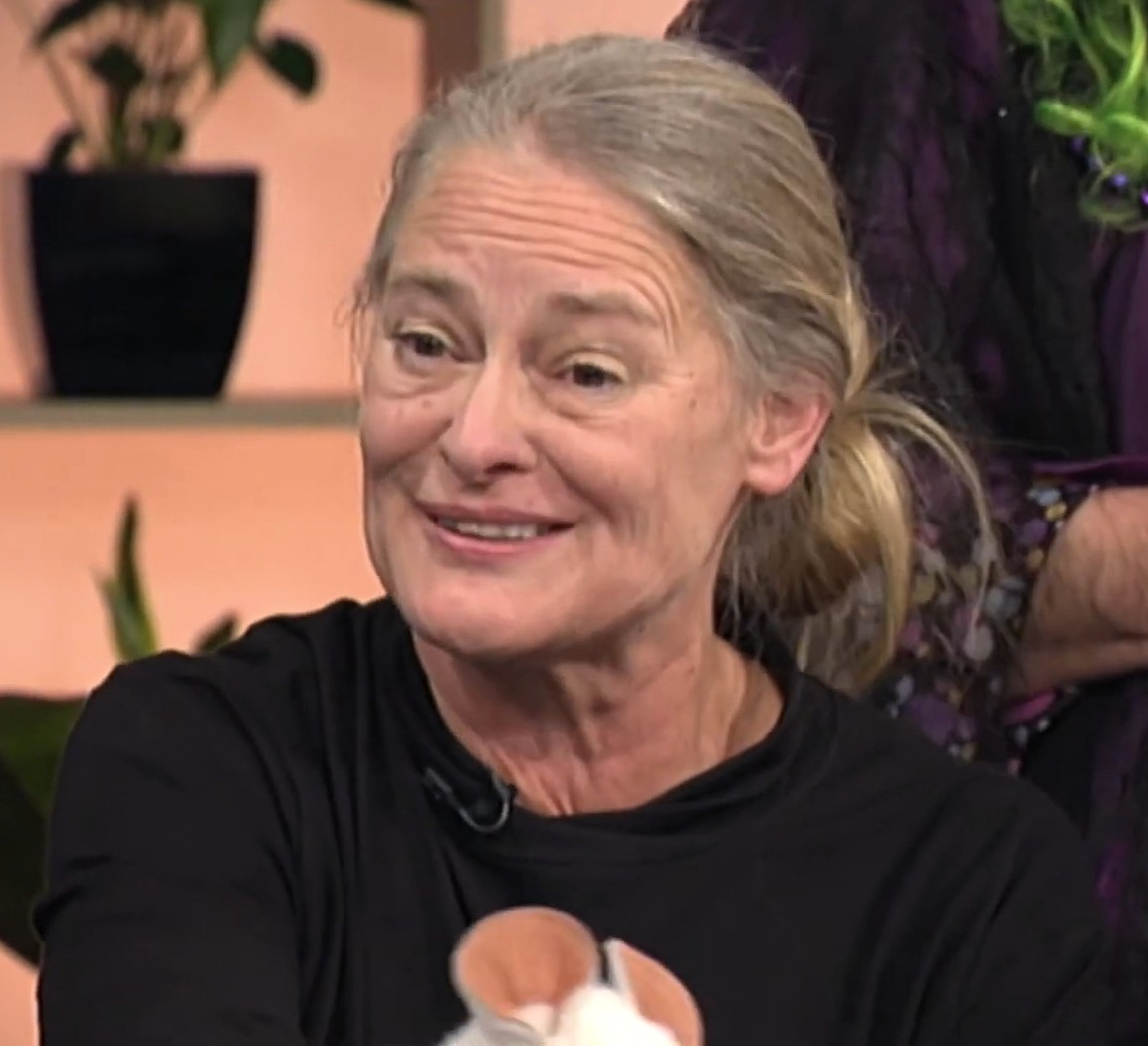
- Rees in 2018
- Born: 1959 (age 66–67); New Zealand
- Occupation: Actor

Donogh Rees (born 1958) is a New Zealand actress. She starred in the long-running soap opera Shortland Street as director of nursing Judy Brownlee from 2001 to 2006.

She starred as Abbie in the sci-fi film Lorca and the Outlaws (1984), in the New Zealand film Constance (1984) in the title role, in the film Crush (1992) as the lead part of Christina, and the film Channelling Baby (1999). She voiced Necrolai in Power Rangers: Mystic Force, and has appeared in Hercules: The Legendary Journeys and Xena: Warrior Princess. She has appeared in numerous stage productions.

== Filmography ==
=== Film ===
Year	Title	Role	Notes
1984	Constance	Constance Elsworthy	
1984	Starship	Abbie	
1987	Starlight Hotel	Helen	
1992	Crush	Christina	
1996	The Beach	Margie	Short
1997	The Bar		Short
2000	Channelling Baby	Childbirth Nurse #1	
2000	The Painted Lady	Miss Robbins	Short
2002	Grace	Vanessa	Short
2011	Elaine Rides Again	Elaine	Short
2011	Jeffery	Barbara	Short
2012	Runaways	Wife	Short
2013	Caretaker	The Matron	Short
2014	If You Can Get Blood	Morgan's Mother	Short
2016	Moving	Kathy	Short
2018	Trophy Hunter	Dentist's Wife	Short

=== Television ===
Year	Title	Role	Notes
1982	One of those Blighters	Embracing Couple	TV film
1984	Iris (aka Out of Time)	Simone / Kate	TV film
1993	Shortland Street	Maggie	Guest Episodes 200, 232-233
1993	The Rainbow Warrior	Lab Supervisor	TV film
1995	Fallout	Marilyn Waring	Episode: "Part One"
1996–1998	City Life	Mia Fulsome	Recurring role
1998–99	Hercules: The Legendary Journeys	Frigga, Mnemosyne, Cabiri	Episodes: "Norse by Norsevest", "Somewhere Over the Rainbow Bridge", "Let There Be Light", "My Best Girl's Wedding"
1999	Xena: Warrior Princess	Chi'ah	Episode: "Them Bones, Them Bones"
2001–2006	Shortland Street	Judy Brownlee	Regular role
2006	Power Rangers Mystic Force	Necrolai (voice)	Main role
2009	Legend of the Seeker	Roga	Episode: "Fury"
2014	The Brokenwood Mysteries	Janet Grimm	Episode: "Playing the Lie"
2015, 2017	Find Me a Maori Bride	Esther Partridge	Episodes: "1.8", "God's Game", "Respect", "Weddings"
2018	Fifty Dollars a Week	Michele	Episode: "Fifty Dollars"
2018	The Adventures of Suzy Boon	Consulate Lawyer	Episode: "How Do You Solve a Problem Like Bloody Mario?"
