= Andrew Laing =

New Zealand actor

- Born: 1 January 1966 (age 60); Auckland, New Zealand
- Other name: Randall Ewing
- Occupation: Actor
- Years active: 1988–present

Andrew Laing (born 1966) is a New Zealand actor best known for his role as Dr. Geoff Greenlaw in the popular soap opera, Shortland Street. He is also known for his theatre work. Laing graduated from Toi Whakaari: New Zealand Drama School with a Diploma in Acting in 1988.

== Filmography ==
Year	Title	Role	Notes
1989	Chunuk Bair	Wounded soldier	
1993, 1996–1997, 2001–2003	Shortland Street	Trevor Bryant / Nigel Bailey / Dr. Geoff Greenlaw	30 episodes
1998	Emmerdale Farm	Shrine	1 episode
2004	Power Rangers Dino Thunder	Copyotter	Voice, Episode: "Copy That"
2005	Power Rangers S.P.D.	Delex	Voice, Episode: "Resurrection"
2006	Power Rangers Mystic Force	Oculous	Voice, 2 episodes
2008	Outrageous Fortune	Andrew	Episode: "Thinking Makes It So"
2008	Power Rangers Jungle Fury	Master Lope	2 episodes
2009	Power Rangers RPM	Venjix Virus	Voice, 30 episodes
2011	Underbelly NZ: Land of the Long Green Cloud	DSS Laurie Mackenzie	Recurring role
2013	Power Rangers Megaforce	The Messenger	Voice, 2 episodes
2014	I Survived a Zombie Holocaust	SMP	
2015	Deathgasm	Aeon	
2016	Power Rangers Dino Super Charge	Jack O'Lantern, Heximas	Voice, Episodes entitled "Trick or Trial", "Here Comes Heximas"
2019–2020	Power Rangers Beast Morphers	Venjix Virus / Evox	Voice, 38 episodes, Credited as Randall Ewing for 37 episodes
2021-2022	Power Rangers Dino Fury	Lord Zedd	Voice, 5 episodes
