= Amber Curreen =

New Zealand actor and theatre producer

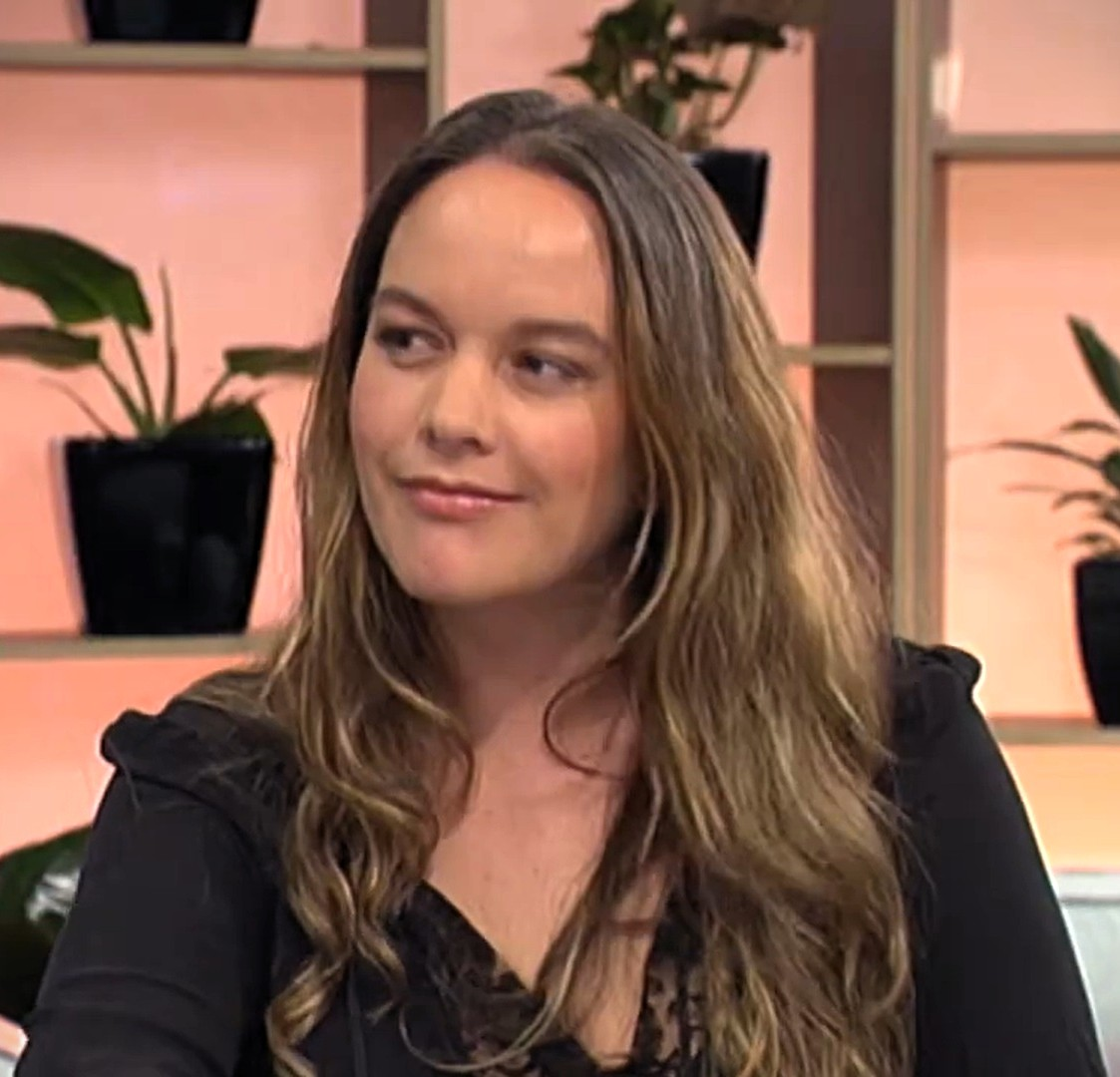
- Curreen in 2018
- Born: c. 1985; Waiheke Island, New Zealand
- Occupations: Actress; theatre producer

Amber Curreen (born c. 1985) is an actress and theatre producer based in Auckland, New Zealand. She played character Shannon Te Ngaru on Shortland Street. She is a producer with Auckland theatre companies Te Rēhia Theatre Company and Te Pou Theatre.

== Life and career ==
Curreen grew up on Waiheke Island. She is of Māori and Pākehā descent. Her father who died in 2017 was Ngāpuhi.

From 2001 to 2006, Curreen was an actress in the television soap opera Shortland Street playing the character Shannon Te Ngaru. She was originally cast for a short period as a 16-year-old but her role was extended.

Curreen is creative producer of Te Rēhia Theatre Company, a theatre company established in 2012, alongside Tainui Tukiwaho. Te Rēhia co-produced a comedy play Black Ties with the ILBIJERRI Theatre Company as an "exploration of what happens when two First Nations cultures collide". The play was presented in 2019 in Australia at the Sydney Festival, Perth Festival and Asia TOPA and then in New Zealand in 2020 at the Auckland Arts Festival and the New Zealand Festival.

Curreen is a founding director of Te Pou Theatre (Te Pou) in Auckland founded in 2015. Te Pou programmes Māori theatre and prior to COVID-19 restrictions in 2020 programmed four shows and two festivals annually. Curreen said the goal was "to provide opportunities to make sure there are Māori artists onstage and audiences seeing are seeing Te Ao Māori onstage."

One of the projects at Te Pou that Curreen produces is the annual Kōanga Festival which fosters Māori playwrights and started in 2015. In 2020 during the COVID-19 pandemic the festival was hosted online, which Curreen said she hoped would enable "the best of both deep listening and hearing, and being able to share it throughout the world, and at the same time people communing with art". She also produced Te Pou's Front Yard Festivals, putting on short live performances for isolated and vulnerable people.

In a collaboration between Te Rēhia and circus performance company The Dust Palace, Curreen co-wrote and developed Te Tangi a te Tūī, a show featuring circus performances. The show's story is inspired by the song of the tūī and by Curreen's whakapapa. It premiered at Canadian theatre The Cultch in October 2023 and is being performed at Te Pou Theatre, Auckland, in March 2024. Curreen, her partner and their two children are performers in the show.

== Selected productions ==
=== Theatre ===
- Mahuika – writer and director
- Hoki Mai Tama Ma by Regan Taylor – producer and actress (2014)
- Ruia Te Kakano – children's play – writer and actress (2014)
- Larger Than Life by Tainui Tukiwaho and Chris Martin – producer (2017)
- Kororāreka – The Ballad of Maggie Flynn by Paolo Rotondo – actress (touring cast 2017–2018)
- Astroman by Albert Belz – co-producer with Auckland Theatre Company (2019)
- Kōpū written by Tuakoi Ohia – director (2022)

=== Screen ===
- Shortland Street – television soap opera – actress playing the character Shannon Te Ngaru (2001–2006)
- Waru – film produced by Kerry Warkia & Kiel McNaughton – actress playing the character Titty (2017)

== Memberships ==
- Executive board of the Performing Arts Network of New Zealand (PANNZ)
- The national Māori theatre committee He Waka Ūrungi
- The Tri-Nationals Indigenous Performing Arts Council
