= List of Shortland Street characters =

Shortland Street is a New Zealand soap opera that has been broadcast on TV2 since 25 May 1992. The show centres on the title hospital and its staff and their families. The following characters currently appear in the soap opera. Characters who have been portrayed by more than one actor, are listed, with the most recent actor at the top of the list.

== Main characters ==
Actor	Character	Duration
Michael Galvin	Chris Warner	1992–1996, 2000–
Fleur Saville	Libby Jeffries	2006–2010, 2012, 2025–
Ngahuia Piripi	Esther Samuels	2015–
Scott Smart	Marty Walker	2019–
Jess Sayer	Maeve Mullens	2020–
Theo David	Viliami To'a	2021–
Stephen Lovatt	Emmett Whitman	2023–
Bella Kalolo-Suraj	Selina To'a	2023–
Peter Burman	Sage Stewart	2023–
Jane Wills	Phil Grayson	2024–
Mo Nasir	Nazar Arshad	2024–
Jordan Mooney	Cody Munroe	2026–
Tia Reweti	Cindy Te Toka	2026–
Alex King	Izzy Ropata	2026–
Christopher Alan Moore	Paul Cremorne	2026–

== Recurring characters ==
Actor	Character	Relation	Duration	Source
Lukas Whiting	Finn Warner	Surgeon at Shortland Street Hospital and Chris Warner's son.	1993, 2016–2018, 2022, 2024, 2026–	
Alison Quigan	Yvonne Jeffries	Libby Jeffries' mother and former Receptionist at Shortland Street Hospital	2004–2012, 2026–	
Kerry-Lee Dewing	Kylie Brown	Former Nurse at Shortland Street Hospital	2012–2020, 2026–	
Elska Phipps	Trinity Kwan	Grace Kwan's and Chris Warner's daughter	2014, 2026–	
Acushla-Tara Kupe	Bonnie Kawiti	Emmett's estranged daughter	2024–	
Boh Allan	Karamea Kawiti	Bonnie's daughter and Emmett's granddaughter	2024–	
Vanessa Rare	Anahera Kawiti	Bonnie's mother, Karamea's grandmother and Emmett's ex-wife	2024–	
Maria Walker	Miriama Ropata	Surgeon, Hone Ropata's sister, Izzy's mother and Chris's sixth wife.	2026–	
Tania Nolan	Sophia Crane	ED Consultant	2026–	
Beatriz Garcia	Daniela "Tank" Hamilton	Crane's ex-girlfriend and Criminal Profiler	2026–	

== Lists of characters by year of introduction ==
- 1992
- 1993
- 1994
- 1995
- 1996
- 1997
- 1998
- 1999
- 2000
- 2001
- 2002
- 2003
- 2004
- 2005
- 2006
- 2007
- 2008
- 2009
- 2010
- 2011
- 2012
- 2013
- 2014
- 2015
- 2016
- 2017
- 2018
- 2019
- 2020
- 2021
- 2022
- 2023
- 2024
- 2025
- 2026
