= David Wikaira-Paul =

New Zealand actor

David Wikaira-Paul (born 30 January 1985) played Tama Hudson on New Zealand television series Shortland Street.

He joined the cast of Shortland Street in 2001 to play fresh-faced 14-year-old Tama Hudson, a high school student. Wikaira-Paul had already left school and completed a year of tertiary education at Northland Polytechnic. He graduated from the Polytechnic in 2000 with a Certificate in Applied Arts, Music and Drama, having played the lead role in their production of Te Ngaru Nui.

Other theatre credits include Late Nights with Tuakau College, and Buggy Wonderland and The Miraculous Fairy Tale with the Kaleidescope Performing Arts Company. Moving to Auckland, he signed with an acting agency and was soon cast in Shortland Street. Over the years his performance as Tama gained him great popularity throughout New Zealand, especially with younger viewers.

Like many of the cast, Wikaira-Paul is also very musically talented. His hip hop group Medical Clan won the prestigious South Side Gig in both 2000 and 2003, and he has written several songs for on-screen alter ego Tama to perform on Shortland Street.

Medical Clan recently performed as part of TV2's 24-hour live music show, National Anthem. He has also appeared in the Maori mystery television series Mataku, which was made by Shortland Street's parent company, South Pacific Pictures. Wikaira-Paul was a contestant on Dancing with the Stars (New Zealand TV series) in 2006. He now has three children and a wife Sam (wife), Ricco(son), Andre(son), Tamara(daughter)
