= Calvin Tuteao =

New Zealand actor

- Born: Calvin Tuteao; Waikato, New Zealand
- Occupation: Actor

Calvin Tuteao is a New Zealand actor who has appeared in Hercules: The Legendary Journeys, Once Were Warriors and Xena: Warrior Princess. Tuteao is renowned for his role on Shortland Street as Dr. Victor Kahu. He and his niece Quantrelle King both acted in Shortland Street and also played an uncle and niece relationship. He plays the bass guitar.

== Filmography ==
Year	Film/TV	Role	Note
2021	Cousins	Hamuera	
2013	Top of the Lake	Turangi	TV series
2012	Hitch Hike	Maka	Short
2011	Nothing Trivial	Matiu Renata / Matiu	TV series
2011	Super City	Solomon	TV series
2011	Waitangi: What Really Happened	Nene	TV movie
2011	Underbelly NZ: Land of the Long Green Cloud	Diamond Jim Shepherd	TV miniseries
2010	Kawa aka Nights in the Gardens of Spain	Kawariki	
2008	Legend of the Seeker	Jeziah	TV series
2008	Burying Brian	Detective	TV series
2008	Patu Ihu	Pakaru	Short
2007	The Man Who Lost His Head	Zac	TV movie
2002–2005	Mataku	Rex / Sergeant Tu Peters	TV series
2000–2004	Shortland Street	Dr. Victor Kahu	TV series
2002	Pikowae		short
2001	Crooked Earth	Sergeant Ropiha	
1996–2000	Xena: Warrior Princess	Dagon; Doge Of Messini; Gurkhan	TV series
2000	Cleopatra 2525	Xev	TV series
2000	The Feathers of Peace	Hiriwanu Tapu	
1999	Duggan	Harris	TV series
1999	Lawless	Willy Kaa	TV movie
1996	Hercules: The Legendary Journeys	Natros	TV series
1994	Once Were Warriors	Taka (Gang Leader)	
