= List of Shortland Street characters introduced in 2006 =

The following is a list of characters that first appeared in the New Zealand soap opera Shortland Street in 2006, by order of first appearance.

== Ant Richards ==
Ant Richards
- Shortland Street character
- Portrayed by: Michael Morris
- Duration: 2006, 2008
- First appearance: 17 January 2006
- Last appearance: 3 September 2008
- Introduced by: Jason Daniel (2006, 2008)
In-universe information
- Occupation: Pharmaceutical Rep

Anthony "Ant" Richards was the man Yvonne Jeffries (Alison Quigan) set up with her daughter Tania (Faye Smythe). Ant worked at the pharmaceutical company Scott Spear and he was often at the hospital trialing the companies drugs. He and Tania soon got together and Ant contributed to Tania's addiction to prescription medication, supplying her with her fix. However Ant soon started to suspect Scott Spear was manufacturing faulty drugs and he and Tania began to get followed. In October 2006 Huia Samuels (Nicola Kawana) borrowed Ant's new car only for the engine to explode from a rigged bomb, killing her and her unborn child. Ant realised Scott Spear was behind the attempted murder on his life and fled. In August 2008 Craig Valentine (Renato Bartolomei) was contacted by Ant whom was in hiding, after he too began investigating Scott Spear. Together the two alongside Sarah Potts (Amanda Billing) and Justine Jones (Lucy Wigmore) set about exposing Scott Spear. However, as the team were finally about to reveal the truth, Craig was brutally murdered and Ant again fled into hiding.

== Mitch Gillespie ==
Mitch Gillespie
- Shortland Street character
- Portrayed by: John Wraight
- Duration: 2006
- First appearance: 19 January 2006
- Last appearance: 2 February 2006
- Introduced by: Jason Daniel

Mitch Gillespie appeared in a guest role in early 2006. Mitch reunited with his former girlfriend Judy Brownlee (Donogh Rees) and it was not long before the two reconciled. In February they departed to live together in Australia.

== TK Samuels ==
Dr. Te Koha "TK" Samuels was the travel worn cousin of Huia Samuels (Nicola Kawana). He has been portrayed by Benjamin Mitchell since 25 January 2006 and since his arrival has become one of the most recognisable faces of the show. The character was involved in a high-profile love triangle between himself, Sarah Potts (Amanda Billing) and Craig Valentine (Renato Bartolomei) which culminated in TK and Sarah getting married, divorced and becoming parents to a daughter – Tillie Potts (Nalani Rose Tuhoe). TK would make it all the way up to CEO as of 2022.

== Libby Jeffries ==
Olivia "Libby" Tippett (née Jeffries) was the final instalment of the Jeffries family unit. She was portrayed by Fleur Saville until April 2010 and again for brief stints in September 2010 and for the shows 20th anniversary in May 2012, before returning as a core cast member in 2025. Good looking and efficient, Libby was the personal assistant to the hospital CEO and was famous for her searching towards the perfect husband.

== Mackie Bowen ==
Mackie Bowen
- Shortland Street character
- Portrayed by: Nick Hopkins
- Duration: 2006
- First appearance: 17 April 2006
- Last appearance: 25 May 2006
- Introduced by: Jason Daniel
In-universe information
- Occupation: Business owner

Mackie Bowen was the old medical school friend of TK Samuels (Benjamin Mitchell). Mackie came to help Jay Copeland (Jamie Passier-Armstrong) run her business as he had become a successful businessman and he began to date Sarah Potts (Amanda Billing). However it soon became clear there was much more to Mackie and it turned out he was a drug addict when he stole Sarah's car. Mackie would then turn on TK, kidnapping him and forcing him to cook meth. TK would escape and Mackie would be arrested.

== Brenda Holloway ==
Brenda Holloway
- Shortland Street character
- Portrayed by: Katherine McRae
- Duration: 2006–07
- First appearance: 17 April 2006
- Last appearance: 1 November 2007
- Introduced by: Jason Daniel
In-universe information
- Occupation: Nurse
- Brothers: Brian Rowley; John Rowley
- Husband: Gary Davis (until 2007)
- Sons: Lachlan Davis

Brenda Holloway showed up in April 2006, looking to find the doctors responsible for the death of her brother. After being spoken to by Craig and being assured nothing untoward happened, Brenda would apply for a position at the hospital as a nurse. Getting offside and clashing with Toni Warner (Laura Hill) immediately, Brenda would also spark up a friendship with Yvonne Jeffries (Alison Quigan). However, it soon became apparent Brenda had a serious drinking problem after receiving a promotion and having the stress of her new position cause her to arrive to work drunk. Her estranged husband Gary (Tim Bray) died in 2007, potentially leaving her with custody of their son – Lachlan (Jonathan Mahon-Heap). Lachlan, however voiced nothing but the utmost disdain for his mother for being absent and drunk for most of his life and ended up with Gary's boyfriend. This would lead to Brenda beginning to drink again. Following the spree of a serial killer dubbed the Ferndale Strangler, Brenda began investigating into a series of mysterious cardiac arrests linked to the killer. However, on Halloween 2007 when Brenda finally discovered the killer's true identity, he murdered her whilst dressed in costume.

== Buddy Haanui ==
Buddy Haanui
- Shortland Street character
- Portrayed by: Antonio Te Maioha
- Duration: 2006–07
- First appearance: 8 May 2006
- Last appearance: 19 July 2007
- Introduced by: Jason Daniel (2006–07)
In-universe information
- Wife: Huia Samuels (until 2004)

Buddy Haanui was portrayed by Antonio Te Maioha in three stints from 2006 to 2007. Whilst visiting his girlfriend Huia Samuels' (Nicola Kawana) marae, Craig Valentine (Renato Bartolomei) was shocked to learn Huia was once married to Buddy. The two had a moment and it looked like they were to reconcile, however Huia ended up leaving Buddy behind. Buddy was disgusted at Craig months later at Huia's funeral for how he had treated her. In 2007 TK Samuels (Benjamin Mitchell) visited his family and was shocked when Buddy suggested selling off parts of the marae to businessmen. In 2014 TK suggested Buddy as a pall-bearer at Sarah Potts' (Amanda Billing) funeral.

== Kuini Samuels ==
Kuini Samuels
- Shortland Street character
- Portrayed by: Ella Henry
- Duration: 2006–2007, 2009–2011, 2014, 2020, 2022
- First appearance: 8 May 2006
- Last appearance: 2022
- Introduced by: Jason Daniel (2006–07); Steven Zanoski (2009–11); Simon Bennett (2014); Maxine Fleming & Oliver Driver (2020)
In-universe information
- Mother: Mareikura Samuels
- Brothers: Mitch Samuels
- Sisters: Miri Samuels; Dotti Samuels; Liz Arthur
- Daughters: Huia Samuels
- Nephews: TK Samuels (nephew)

Kuini Samuels was the disproving mother of Huia Samuels (Nicola Kawana) and the aunt of TK Samuels (Benjamin Mitchell). Kuini was disgusted in Huia for not returning to the marae and showed great gratitude towards TK for his input towards the Whanau's health. However Kuini was extremely sick and Huia's boyfriend Craig Valentine (Renato Bartolomei) diagnosed her with a growth and not cancer as she had feared. Later in the year at Huia's tangi Kuini expressed regret at the way she had treated her only daughter. In 2007 Kuini attended TK's wedding and got into a fight with her sister Liz Arthur (Rima Te Wiata) for the way she had treated TK. TK and his wife Sarah (Amanda Billing) visited Kuini in 2009 following their termination and Kuini revealed that before Huia, she had suffered two miscarriages. TK visited Kuini in 2010 to set up a clinic at the marae but the input of Brooke Freeman (Beth Allen) initially put stress on the idea but it turned out to be a positive movement on the whanau. Kuini visited again in 2011 and made it clear she thought TK was still in love with Sarah however several months later at TK's wedding to Roimata Ngatai (Shavaughn Ruakere), Kuini encouraged TK to go through with the ceremony. Kuini returned to Ferndale in August 2014 following Sarah's death. She helped organize the funeral and supported TK following his loss. Kuini returned to Ferndale 6 years later with a group of relatives, in an attempt to lure TK back to serve as the local marae's doctor. Undeterred due to his new romance, TK convinced his niece Esther (Ngahuia Piripi) to go in his place. Kuini returned in 2022 for TK's wedding to Cece King. Kuini was the celebrant for the wedding.

== Hamish Flynn ==
Hamish Flynn
- Shortland Street character
- Portrayed by: Alan Brash
- Duration: 2006
- First appearance: 27 June 2006
- Last appearance: 10 July 2006
- Introduced by: Jason Daniel (2006)
In-universe information
- Father: Ian Jeffries
- Mother: Yvonne Jeffries
- Sisters: Maia Jeffries; Tania Jeffries; Libby Jeffries
- Sons: Peter Flynn
- Nephews: JJ Jeffries

Hamish Flynn was the long lost son of Yvonne Jeffries (Alison Quigan) who first appeared in 2006. After being left with the details of her real son Hamish by Richard Minogue (Phil Brown) who had been exposed for stealing the identity of the real Hamish along with several other children who'd been adopted out at birth, Yvonne would try to track him down. Meeting Hamish in the park after a couple of days of watching he and his son Pete playing in the park, Yvonne helped the two when Pete injured himself playing soccer. Hamish confronted Yvonne after she asked Pete for a hug and was further made wary about Yvonne when busting her breaking and entering into the Flynn family house to find more information on Hamish. After identifying herself as Hamish's birth mother, Hamish told Yvonne that he was happy with the life he'd been given by his adopted family. Declining any further contact, Hamish wished her well before leaving.

== Justin Salt ==
Justin Salt
- Shortland Street character
- Portrayed by: Heath Jones
- Duration: 2006–07
- First appearance: 14 July 2006
- Last appearance: 12 December 2007
- Introduced by: Jason Daniel
In-universe information
- Occupation: Surgeon

Justin Salt, played by Heath Jones, made his first appearance on 14 July 2006, departing later that month. He'd return again in early 2017, before returning from 4 to 11 December 2007.

Justin's first appearance was as a locum hired by Huia Samuels (Nicola Kawana). After a brief flirtation, he and Libby Jeffries (Fleur Saville) would go to a party. After escorting her home, Justin would try to force himself on her before being physically removed from the premises by Ant Richards (Michael Morris). Justin would return early in 2007 as a surgeon working under Justine Jones (Lucy Wigmore) and began to harass Claire Solomon (Emily Robins). One night at The IV, when he goes too far, troubled amnesiac and barman Kieran Mitchell intervenes, revealing a dormant volatile nature. The violence escalates when Kieran convinces Claire to assist him in kidnapping Justin to teach him a lesson. They bring him to a garden shed behind their home and under duress he repents for his behaviour. He was later discovered by Jay Copeland bound in the trunk of a car. Justin would again leave swearing revenge on Kieran and Claire. He wouldn't get the chance however as Claire would be the first victim of Joey Henderson (Johnny Barker), the serial killer known as the Ferndale Strangler.

Justin returned towards the end of 2007 in order to clear up the Surgical Waiting Lists in time for Christmas. After being robbed by Harmony O' Neill (Hetty Gaskett-Hahn) and attempting to attack her at the end of a night shift and threatening to expose Kieran for his previous actions, Justin became a suspect in the case of the Ferndale Strangler. While being found incapable of being the Strangler, the arrogant surgeon was framed after a falling out with old medical school associate Gavin Capper (Tim Schijf), to which he retaliated by reporting Gavin for the rape of a woman named Denise Roycroft while they were at Medical School together. Justin was last seen with Gavin being escorted from the building, Gavin arrested for rape, Justin being an accessory to the fact.

== Ingrid Campbell ==
Ingrid Campbell
- Shortland Street character
- Portrayed by: Madeleine Lynch
- Duration: 2006–07, 2009
- First appearance: 18 July 2006
- Last appearance: 26 February 2009
- Introduced by: Jason Daniel (2006); Steven Zanoski (2009)
In-universe information
- Occupation: Surgeon

Dr. Ingrid Campbell was the strong willed surgeon who filled in for Chris Warner (Michael Galvin) whilst he was on sick leave. She clashed with Mark Weston (Tim Foley) and departed. Ingrid returned several months later when Chris planned to flee Ferndale and hired her as his replacement. She stayed until early 2007. Ingrid returned two years later as the temporary head of surgery following the murder of Ethan Pierce (Owen Black), and was quick to show her disgust at the wheel chair bound Tane Samuels (Dominic Ona-Ariki) getting hired. However the two soon bonded before Ingrid was replaced by Gabrielle Jacobs (Virginie Le Brun).

== Sammy Diamond ==
Sammy Diamond
- Shortland Street character
- Portrayed by: Andy Anderson
- Duration: 2006
- First appearance: 22 August 2006
- Last appearance: 24 August 2006
- Introduced by: Jason Daniel
In-universe information
- Occupation: Singer

Sammy Diamonds appeared for 3 episodes in August 2006. He was a singer on the cruise boat Yvonne Jeffries (Alison Quigan) was on and the two had a holiday romance. 3 years later Yvonne pretended her blooming romance with Ben Goodall (Shaun Edwards-Brown) was really a reconciliation with Sammy.

== Holly Makatea ==
Holly Makatea
- Shortland Street character
- Portrayed by: Miriama McDowell
- Duration: 2006–07
- First appearance: 5 October 2006
- Last appearance: 17 April 2007
- Introduced by: Jason Daniel (2006–07)
In-universe information
- Occupation: Prostitute; Receptionist

Holly Makatea was the receptionist at the General Practitioner clinic that TK Samuels (Benjamin Mitchell) worked at. TK was smitten by Holly but was shocked to discover she was a sex worker. Nonetheless, the two began to date but TK discovered he had fallen in love with Sarah Potts (Amanda Billing) and broke it off. Holly returned in 2007 and sought out TK, making Sarah jealous. However it turned out Holly was after a STI check, fearing she had HIV. The results came back positive, devastating both Holly and TK, whom she had slept with.

== John Grainger ==
John Grainger
- Shortland Street character
- Portrayed by: Jason Hoyte
- Duration: 2006, 2008, 2009
- First appearance: 6 September 2006
- Last appearance: 20 July 2009
- Introduced by: Jason Daniel (2006, 2008); Steven Zanoski (2009)
In-universe information
- Occupation: business executive
- Wife: Melody Grainger

John Grainger (originally Markson) was the slimy CEO of dodgy pharmaceutical company Scott-Spear. John first appeared presenting his products to Sarah Potts (Amanda Billing), but upon investigation from Sarah and Ant Richards (Michael Morris), a former Scott-Spear employee, it was discovered Scott-Spear were making up medical conditions to peddle fake drugs for a profit. Upon having their data proving their fraud stolen by Ant, John would send thugs to threaten him. The company later tried to murder Ant but accidentally killed Huia Samuels (Nicola Kawana) in a car bomb. Ant would flee and this would be the last of John until 2008 when he sought out Craig Valentine (Renato Bartolomei) for a job at Scott-Spear. However Craig discovered Scott-Spear was again dealing in dodgy drugs in part to Ant, who had returned in secret and Justine Jones (Lucy Wigmore). Justine would flirt with John and stole a ledger detailing people Scott-Spear had killed off. John returned in 2009 when he confronted both Justine's family before the trial of Scott-Spear and showed optimism towards the charges. He later threatened Sophie (Kimberley Crossman) when he discovered Justine had faked her death. In 2010 Sarah Potts (Amanda Billing) stated that John had been imprisoned and was facing millions of dollars' worth of penalties.

== Callum McKay ==
Callum McKay
- Shortland Street character
- Portrayed by: Peter Mochrie
- Duration: 2006–12
- First appearance: 23 October 2006
- Last appearance: 25 May 2012
- Introduced by: Jason Daniel
In-universe information
- Occupation: Head of drug rehabilitation department at Shortland Street hospital (2012); Chief executive officer at Shortland Street hospital (2008–11, 2011–12); General Practitioner at Shortland Street hospital (2006–08)
- Mother: Mona McKay
- Brothers: Gordon McKay
- Wife: Justine Jones (1989–2010)
- Sons: Hunter McKay
- Daughters: Sophie McKay

Dr. Callum McKay first appeared in October 2006 and it was said he was to: "give the hospital a good shake up." In 2012 the character was axed, something which Peter Mochrie did not mind as he felt he was "coasting" throughout his final year and was missing his onscreen family. Despite hitting it off with Libby Jeffries (Fleur Saville), Callum was revealed as the husband of Justine Jones (Laurie Foell). The couple briefly separated when Callum discovered Justine (Lucy Wigmore) had an affair with Chris Warner (Michael Galvin). In 2008 Callum had an affair with Martha Riley (Jacque Drew) though he and Justine remained together. Callum became CEO of the hospital despite his dodgey business dealings with Ethan Pierce (Owen Black). His marriage to Justine fell apart when she faked her death and he had a short lived affair with Brooke Freeman (Beth Allen). He went on to date Rachel McKenna (Angela Bloomfield) for several months before he lost his job after being manipulated by Shane Tucker (Jason Hood). In mid 2011 he scandalously began an affair with son Hunter's (Lee Donoghue) ex-girlfriend Jill (Natalie Medlock) before he got his job back. Callum was devastated when Hunter's drug addiction was revealed and Jill died as a result of a botched pharmacy break-in. In 2012 Callum resigned as CEO and took up a role heading the new drug rehabilitation programme so as to help Hunter. Following Hunters departure, Callum left in May left to reconnect with his children.

== Fran Piper ==
Fran Piper
- Shortland Street character
- Portrayed by: Fiona Edgar
- Duration: 2006–09
- First appearance: 30 October 2006
- Last appearance: 2009
- Introduced by: Jason Daniel (2006–08); Steven Zanoski (2009)
In-universe information
- Daughters: Alice Piper
- Granddaughters: Kelly Piper

Fran Piper was the eccentric mother of Alice (Toni Potter). She arrived in 2006 and attempted to start a business in Ferndale, though her bipolar disorder soon became apparent and she ended up leaving.

== Samantha Thomas ==
Samantha Thomas
- Shortland Street character
- Portrayed by: Ryland Wood
- Duration: 2006–07
- First appearance: 22 November 2006
- Last appearance: 3 July 2007
- Introduced by: Jason Daniel (2006, 2007)

Samantha "Sam" Thomas made her first appearance in November 2006. A transgender nurse, Sam was born a male but was known to the hospital staff as a woman. She engaged in poker matches with Yvonne Jeffries (Alison Quigan) and Grunter (Semu Filipo) against hospital rules. The matches were put to an end and the three were punished when Brenda (Katherine McRae) dobbed them in. In 2007 Sam returned when she and Yvonne made a pact to overcome their fears. Sam helped Yvonne overcome her fear of worms whilst Yvonne helped Sam overcome her fear of flying.

== Sophie McKay ==
Sophie Juliette McKay (previously Mitchell) was the teenage daughter of Justine Jones (Laurie Foell) and Callum McKay (Peter Mochrie). She was portrayed by Kimberley Crossman until 2011 and again for a guest appearance in 2012 for the shows 20th anniversary. At first naive and superficial, throughout her time on the show Sophie developed into a student and a business woman, who by the end of her stint, was a widow to dodgy business man – Kieran Mitchell (Adam Rickitt).

== Hunter McKay ==
Hunter McKay was the teenage son of Justine Jones (Laurie Foell) and Callum McKay (Peter Mochrie). He was portrayed by Lee Donoghue until March 2012. The character debuted as an intelligent jock, who bullied Scarlett Valentine (Nicole Thomson) to the extent that she attempted to murder him. His story lines saw him develop into a sensitive and hard working medical student. However Hunter's final storyline saw him develop an addiction to Crystal Meth that led to his departure.

== Robyn Gardner ==
Robyn Gardner
- Shortland Street character
- Portrayed by: Vikki Cottingham
- Duration: 2006–09
- First appearance: April 2006
- Last appearance: July 2009
- Introduced by: Jason Daniel (2006–08); Steven Zanoski (2009)
In-universe information
- Occupation: Police detective

Robyn Gardner appeared in 4 guest stints from 2006 to 2009. At first Robyn investigated the fraud committed by Richard Minogue (Hamish Flynn). She was the head investigator of the Ferndale Stranglings and later harassed the lead suspect, Kieran Mitchell (Adam Rickitt). In 2008 and 2009 she investigated claims against dodgy drug company – Scott Spear and escorted Justine Jones (Lucy Wigmore) to court when a threat was taken against her life.
