= List of Shortland Street characters introduced in 2005 =

The following is a list of characters that first appeared in the New Zealand soap opera Shortland Street in 2005, by order of first appearance.

== Hugo Carmont ==
Hugo Carmont
- Shortland Street character
- Portrayed by: Fraser Brown
- Duration: 2005
- First appearance: 15 February 2005
- Last appearance: 21 October 2005
- Introduced by: Harriet Crampton
In-universe information
- Occupation: Lawyer
- Brothers: Michael Carmont

Hugo Carmont made his first appearance in February 2005 as the old friend of Mark Weston (Tim Foley). Hugo was a lawyer and represented Eti Kawaka (Isaac Bell) when he was arrested for breaking into several houses and recording the sleeping residents. He paid Li Mei Chen (Li Ming Hu) for sex under the guise of helping her sick partner, Norman and it was not long before it was revealed he was the home invader by masking up before jumping Yvonne Jeffries (Alison Quigan) and strangling her before being stabbed with gardening sheers through the shoulder. It would also eventually be revealed Hugo was desperately after Mark's affection due to Mark defending him from bullies as children. Later, in order to get more attention from Mark, Hugo would twice allow himself to be assaulted to be put in hospital. After noticing Mark was in love with lesbian nurse Maia Jeffries (Anna Jullienne), Hugo would plot to murder and disfigure her in an isolated forest but his efforts resulted in him falling to his presumed death from a cliff. However several weeks later Hugo returned and pleaded to Mark to let him free. Mark turned him in to the police and Hugo was later sentenced to jail time.

== Eileen Horrocks ==
Eileen Horrocks
- Shortland Street character
- Portrayed by: Cathy Downes
- Duration: 2005
- First appearance: 24 May 2005
- Last appearance: 26 May 2005
- Introduced by: Harriet Crampton
In-universe information
- Mother: Phyllis Gregory
- Sisters: Yvonne Jeffries; Janice Gregory
- Sons: Richard Horrocks; Simon Horrocks
- Daughters: Anna Horrocks
- Grandsons: James Horrocks
- Grandfathers: Horace Gregory
- Nephews: Hamish Flynn
- Nieces: Maia Jeffries; Libby Jeffries; Tania Jeffries

Eileen Horrocks (née Gregory) was first mentioned in dialogue in 2004, before she arrived for three episodes in March 2005. Eileen visited her sister, Yvonne (Alison Quigan) whilst on the way of an overseas trip. She was very fond of her niece Maia (Anna Jullienne) but was disgusted to learn she was a lesbian. Eileen voiced disapproval to Yvonne who informed her how proud she was of her daughter before sending her on her way.

== Richard Minogue ==
Richard Minogue
- Shortland Street character
- Portrayed by: Phil Brown
- Duration: 2005–06
- First appearance: 22 July 2005
- Last appearance: 6 April 2006
- Introduced by: Harriet Crampton
In-universe information
- Occupation: Personal assistant Conman

Richard Minogue made his first appearance in mid-2005 under the name: Hamish Flynn. In 2006 the character was axed as part of a soap revamp. Tania Jeffries (Faye Smythe) was interested romantically in Hamish but when he got a job at the hospital, he clashed with her mother, Yvonne (Alison Quigan). Hamish soon revealed he was the son Yvonne and Ian (Jeffrey Thomas) had adopted out when they were teenagers and he was welcomed into the family. Hamish began to date Sarah Potts (Amanda Billing) but his boss Huia Samuels (Nicola Kawana) began to suspect Hamish of fraud. Initially, Hamish would be cleared of any wrongdoing by framing the recently departed CEO Andrew Solomon (Paolo Rotondo) of theft which was followed by the District Health Board choosing to sweep the incident under the rug to save face. Not long afterward, a woman named Josie Lorimer would come to the hospital and identify Hamish as her son Jack. While Hamish covered his tracks by inventing a fictitious friend Josie had mistaken him for, his duplicity would further be shown as upon finding Josie had died via disguising his voice in a phone call, Richard would accept inheritance Josie had left behind, revealing Jack Lorimer to be someone whose identity Richard had stolen. Being caught out by Li Mei Chen (Li Ming Hu), Hamish explained the con to her while Li Mei swore to secrecy for the sum of $10,000. In 2006, after getting caught defrauding the hospital a second time, Hamish would get arrested and Yvonne would be called in for questioning. It would be revealed that "Hamish" was really Richard Minogue, a serial scammer. Yvonne would confront Richard, who admitted targeting women who adopted their kids out for their fortunes in revenge for being adopted out as a child and rejected as an adult by his birth mother, confirming he was not Yvonne's son after all. Yvonne would pay one last visit out of pity to Richard before he was arrested, with Richard admitting he had genuinely grown to love and care for Yvonne as if she were his own mother. The police showed up to arrest him, but before being carted off, Richard would give Yvonne the details of the real Hamish Flynn.

== Tim Coombes ==
Tim Coombes
- Shortland Street character
- Portrayed by: Millen Baird
- Duration: 2005
- First appearance: 1 August 2005
- Last appearance: 18 August 2005
- Introduced by: Harriet Crampton
In-universe information
- Occupation: Owner of diving business
- Wife: Theresa Coombes (1995—)
- Sons: Daniel Potts
- Daughters: Grace Coombes

Timothy "Tim" Coombes appeared in a guest role in August and was portrayed by Millen Baird. He was the ex-boyfriend of Sarah Potts (Amanda Billing) and father of her illegitimate son Daniel (Jarred Blakiston). Tim had no knowledge of Daniel's existence and reentered Sarah's life when he landed in hospital after a school reunion. Initially Tim was angry and wanted nothing to do with his child, but upon meeting him, he embraced his son and Daniel eventually departed to live with Tim, his wife Theresa (Fiona Collins) and daughter Grace in Samoa. Tim sent Daniel (Ido Drent) back to New Zealand in 2009 after he fell into a bad crowd and his business managed to survive the 2009 Samoa earthquake and tsunami. Daniel visited Tim in 2012 to help with his business.

== Theresa Coombes ==
Theresa Coombes
- Shortland Street character
- Portrayed by: Fiona Hall
- Duration: 2005
- Appears on: 18 August 2005
- Introduced by: Harriet Crampton
In-universe information
- Husband: Tim Coombes (1995—)
- Daughters: Grace Coombes
- Stepsons: Daniel Potts

Theresa Coombes was portrayed by Fiona Hall and was the Samoan wife of Daniel's (Jarred Blakiston) father Tim (Millen Baird). Theresa had been with Tim for 10 years and proved to Sarah that Tim was willing to spend time with his only son.

== Grant Faalago ==
Grant "Grunter" Faalago
- Shortland Street character
- Portrayed by: Semu Filipo
- Duration: 2005–09
- First appearance: 13 July 2005
- Last appearance: October 2009
- Introduced by: Harriet Crampton (2005); Jason Daniel (2007, 2008)
In-universe information
- Occupation: Paramedic (until 2009)

Grant "Grunter" Faalago appeared sporadically until 2009 and was known as the comedic paramedic who worked at the hospital. Grunter got on well with Yvonne Jeffries (Alison Quigan) and the pair caused controversy when they were caught playing cards in the hospital grounds. Grunter later returned as the paramedic supervisor of Hunter McKay (Lee Donoghue) and Hunter was impressed as Grunter worked two jobs a day. However Grunter's tiredness caught up to him and he took a nap whilst letting Hunter take the ambulance wheel, only for the pair to crash and Grunter to lose his job for the mistake. He returned several weeks later and tried to con Maxwell Avia (Robbie Magasiva) into not reporting his friend for not having a visa.

== Jemima Hampton ==
Jemima Hampton-Rees
- Shortland Street character
- Portrayed by: Liesha Ward-Knox
- Duration: 2005–06, 2014, 2016–17
- First appearance: 22 August 2005
- Last appearance: 13 October 2017
- Introduced by: Harriet Crampton (2005); Simon Bennett (2014–16) Maxine Fleming (2017)
In-universe information
- Occupation: Cafe worker (until 2005)
- Husband: Theo (until 2007); Rolly Rees (2011–14)
- Sons: Michael Hampton-Rees

Jemima Hampton-Rees (née Hampton) was portrayed by Liesha Ward-Knox and appeared from 2005 to 2006. Jemima was a tourist from the United Kingdom who worked in the hospital cafeteria. She connected with Vinnie Kruse (Pua Magasiva) and after all her money and traveling gear was stolen, she and Vinnie began a relationship. However the revelation that she was married put an end to the relationship and she departed. Jemima returned however and revealed she was pregnant. Vinnie wanted nothing to do with the child and Jemima returned to Britain. However several days later Vinnie decided he was prepared to be a dad and departed Ferndale to live with Jemima. In 2011 Vinnie returned and announced Jemima had left him. Having remarried and moved to South America, Jemima returned to Ferndale in May 2014 to let Vinnie see his son, Michael (Duane Evans Jr.). She ended up leaving her husband Rolly and becoming overly dependent on Vinnie. Ultimately, Jemima moved permanently to Ferndale, sharing custody with Vinnie of their son. In October 2017 Jemima took Michael with her to Singapore following a new job. The following year she suffered a stroke, leading Vinnie to move over to care for Michael.

Jemima was an unpopular character and was regarded as a 'cow' by fans.

== Baxter Cormack ==
Baxter Cormack
- Shortland Street character
- Portrayed by: Tom Hern
- Duration: 2005–07
- First appearance: 8 November 2005
- Last appearance: 15 March 2007
- Introduced by: Harriet Crampton
In-universe information
- Occupation: Nurse at Shortland Street hospital (2005–07)
- Father: Gus Cormack
- Mother: Sue Cormack

Baxter Cormack first appeared in November 2005. A religious fanatic, Baxter gained employment at the hospital and made friends with Claire Solomon (Emily Robins). The two began to date and Baxter nearly drowned when he accidentally took LSD. The couple got eventually got engaged, with Claire finding religion as a result. Baxter's Serenity church went too far at Maia (Anna Jullienne) and Jay's (Jaime Passier-Armstrong) civil union, with Baxter eventually apologising, although staying with the church. Later that year, Baxter's father would return but upon rejecting his father's attempts to reform and reconcile, Baxter's parents moved away leading Baxter moving in with TK and Alice. Baxter's mother's health would take a turn for the worse with her falling into a coma at the end of 2006 and dying soon into the New Year. After hallucinating his mother giving him advice, Baxter began to affiliate himself with a group of faith healers and began to tell people to ignore medical advice in favour of his faith healing beliefs. After getting in trouble with TK and his co-workers, Baxter would leave town with Eli, the leader of the group leaving a heartbroken Claire behind.

== Alice Piper ==
Alice Piper
- Shortland Street character
- Portrayed by: Toni Potter
- Duration: 2005–09
- First appearance: 6 December 2005
- Last appearance: 16 June 2009
- Introduced by: Harriet Crampton
In-universe information
- Occupation: Nurse at Shortland Street hospital (2005–09)
- Mother: Fran Piper
- Daughters: Kelly Piper

Alice Piper appeared from late 2005 to mid 2009. Alice was hired as a nurse at the hospital and instantly got off to a bad foot when she kissed married man, Tama Hudson (David Wikaira-Paul). In the following months, she had an affair with Tania Jeffries' (Faye Smythes) lover Mark Weston (Tim Foley), again putting her off guard with the staff. Alice's party ways died down in 2007 when she settled down with her former employer as a nanny, Craig Valentine (Renato Bartolomei). The age difference proved difficult however especially with the arrival of her former flame Kip Denton (Will Hall). After being kidnapped and nearly murdered by the Ferndale Strangler, Alice took up heavy drinking and had a one-night stand with Guy Warner (Craig Parker). Craig proposed to Alice but when she revealed she was pregnant and it may not be his, the two broke up. Alice gave birth to her daughter severely premature and nearly reconciled with Craig, only for him to be brutally murdered. Alice's daughter died not soon after. Alice began to date Ethan Pierce (Owen Black) but realised he was recording them in bed, resulting in her being arrested for his murder. However it turned out Alice's best friend Maia Jeffries (Anna Jullienne) was the true culprit and Alice helped her cover up the death, whilst also sharing a potential romance. Alice briefly dated Xavier Moyo (Brian Manthenga) but ultimately ended up falling back in love with Kip. The two would rekindle their relationship and ultimately stay in Rarotonga, quitting their jobs at Shortland Street in the process.
