= Justine Jones =

- Shortland Street character
- Lucy Wigmore as Justine Jones (2009)
- Portrayed by: Laurie Foell (2005–2006); Lucy Wigmore (2007–2009)
- Duration: 2005–2009
- First appearance: 28 September 2005
- Last appearance: 27 July 2009
- Introduced by: Harriet Crampton (2005); Jason Daniel (2006); Steven Zanoski (2009)
In-universe information
- Other names: Josie
- Occupation: Surgeon
- Husband: Callum McKay (1989–2010)
- Sons: Hunter McKay
- Daughters: Sophie McKay

Dr. Justine McKay (also Jones)^{1} is a fictional character on the New Zealand soap opera Shortland Street who appeared in numerous stints from 2005 to 2009. She was portrayed by Laurie Foell in 2005 for a guest stint before returning in 2006 as a regular character. In 2007 the role was controversially recast, with Lucy Wigmore taking over. She played the role through to 2008 and again in a guest stint in 2009.

Originally a rival of high standing surgeon - Chris Warner (Michael Galvin), the character of Justine was soon expanded into the matriarch of a new family unit, the McKays. Her husband, Callum (Peter Mochrie) and children Hunter (Lee Donoghue) and Sophie (Kimberley Crossman) arrived in late-2006. Justine started an affair with her ex rival, Chris and ended up briefly separating from Callum she starred in a hugely high profile storyline in 2008, where Justine faked her death and entered witness protection to escape hired thugs. She returned in 2009 for a special appearance to start off the Winter season, where she testified against the thugs and separated from Callum. The character's feisty no nonsense personality saw her maintain several stable friendships with; Sarah Potts (Amanda Billing) and Luke Durville (Gerald Urquhart). She also developed notable feuds, mainly with Toni Warner (Laura Hill).

The character was largely popular, being asked to return after both her departures in 2008 and 2009. The decision to recast Justine proved largely controversial but following audiences eventual acceptance, Wigmore's performance proved hugely favourable.

== Creation and casting ==
The name 'Justine Jones' had been mentioned in dialogue for several weeks before it was announced in September 2005 that Home and Away star, Laurie Foell would be arriving to the show to portray the character in a short term stint. The following year Foell was offered to reprise the role with the intention of expanding the character so as to introduce a family unit. Foell was happy to return to the role, "It was a great experience being on Shortland Street. It can be a nerve-wracking going into a new show but everyone was really very welcoming and warm. I thought the writing was excellent and it was great working with the other actors." The character's return saw the introduction of her family: husband Callum McKay (Peter Mochrie) and children, Hunter (Lee Donoghue) and Sophie (Kimberley Crossman). In late-2006 Foell decided to leave the role and quit, returning to her home country of Australia. Her departure was reportedly a "mutual decision by the actor and the producers". The producers were faced with a difficult decision that they had never faced in the show's 14-year run, in that an actress had quit prematurely with the character still yet to undergo storylines. They considered writing her out but instead decided to recast. There was immense speculation amongst fans and the media that Foell was in fact fired, though the actresses agent did not release a statement. Lucy Wigmore had previously auditioned for another role and producers contacted her and offered the role of Justine, something which she had hesitations about, "Signing up for a year contract is slightly daunting plus exciting so it’s a bit of a catch 22 situation. It's fabulous to have work for a year and know that’s I’ll be paid. But on the other hand you're signing off for other projects. I didn’t know what I was getting myself into so there was a bit of trepidation."

Wigmore accepted the role after confirming with producers that she would not be replicating Foell's interpretation of Justine. Despite playing the role of a middle aged mother, Wigmore was only 29 when she was cast, just 6 years older than her onscreen son Lee Donoghue. Wigmore quit the role in 2008 to travel overseas, she stated, "it was sad to say goodbye, to a lot of people on Shortland Street, I’ll be sad to say goodbye to a regular job too. The show’s been incredible and has given me so much experience as an actress. But a couple of years working there is about right for me." Following her departure from the soap on 11 September 2008, the media began to speculate that Justine would return to finish off "loose-ends". The following year, Wigmore's agent was contacted by producers of the show, inquiring if Wigmore was able to return in a guest stint. Wigmore was happy to return, "I couldn't wait to catch up with all of the cast and crew. Everyone is such fun to work with. It's strange though, now that I'm back, it feels like I only left yesterday!" Producer, Steven Zanoski was pleased Justine was back, "Justine's storyline left audiences with lots of unanswered questions, so it's brilliant to have her back to tie up those loose ends."

== Storylines ==
Justine arrived to Shortland Street as a surgeon replacing Chris Warner (Michael Galvin), who was on stress leave. She instantly clashed with Dr. Li Mei Chen (Li Ming Hu) and ended up using Chris' anxiety condition to take a lucrative surgery position from underneath his nose and return to Australia. She returned the following year and started an affair with Mark Weston (Tim Foley) before she revealed new doctor, Callum McKay (Peter Mochrie), was her husband. Her children Hunter (Lee Donoghue) and Sophie (Kimberley Crossman) arrived and Justine won the head of surgery position. As the year ended, she and Chris started a steamy affair. Callum discovered the affair and the two separated. He soon forgave Justine and they rekindled.

Justine joined Craig Valentine (Renato Bartolomei) in investigating dodgy pharmaceutical company, Scott Spear. They discovered shocking evidence and Craig ended up getting murdered, Justine discovered she was being hunted and faked her death, joining witness protection in Australia to wait for the trial. She returned and the McKays decided to leave for Australia after the trial, however Justine realized Callum had fallen in love with Brooke Freeman (Beth Allen) in her absence and after she testified, left to Australia alone. Hunter stated that Justine was studying in Sydney and was potentially up for a Nobel Prize.

Later, Callum acknowledged that he and Justine were divorced. The following year Callum did not inform Justine of Hunter's drug addiction so as not to worry her.

== Character development ==
Laurie Foell believed Justine was a hard worker, stating, "Most of what Justine does is about proving something to herself. Business is business, but she isn't a ball breaker. Justine has worked long and hard to get where she is and she wants to make something new for herself, separate from the traditional male environment." She didn't believe she was similar to the character however, "She has a dry sense of humour and she’s really previse. I’m not prices at all. I’m very vague and have to concert are like hell not to be late. Her sense of humour is very deadpan and I like to think mines more skew whiff." The characters backstory saw her decline her fiercely ambitious father's decision and pursue a career in medicine rather than law, something which saw her develop a strong sense of feminist pride. Part of this development was behind Foell's decision to accept the role, "There aren’t many female surgeons. They work in full time male environment and I thought it’d be interesting to see how an intelligent woman dealt with it." Upon Justine's return in 2009, she struggled with how her family had advanced without her, Lucy Wigmore explained, "Justine is incredibly concerned for her family. She's pretty accustomed to living in hiding and can handle herself pretty well, but her family are a different story."

== Reception ==
The recast of Justine proved to be heavily controversial at the time, with negativity reaching such a state where Wigmore would not read online feedback. Following her debut in January 2007, Wigmore's performance was largely criticized. However her portrayal of Justine gradually proved to be popular, winning runner up for "Favourite New Character" in the Throng Shortland Street Fan Awards 2006. Her exit in 2008 proved satisfying for fans, winning runner up for "Best Episode" and resulted in fans voting her the character they would like to most bring back and her return the most wanted storyline to occur the following year. In 2009 she won third place for character fans would most like to bring back. Charlotte Cowan of Entertainment Fix criticized Justine's 2009 return, calling it a "fail" and naming it in a series of disappointing return storylines on the soap.
