= Sophie McKay =

- Shortland Street character
- Portrayed by: Kimberley Crossman
- Duration: 2006–12
- First appearance: 8 December 2006
- Last appearance: 25 May 2012
- Introduced by: Jason Daniel (2006); Steven Zanoski (2012)
In-universe information
- Occupation: Student
- Father: Callum McKay
- Mother: Justine Jones
- Brothers: Hunter McKay
- Husband: Kieran Mitchell (2010)
- Grandmothers: Mona McKay
- Uncles: Gordon McKay

Sophie Juliette McKay is a fictional character on the New Zealand soap opera Shortland Street who was portrayed by Kimberley Crossman from 2006 to 2011 as part of the McKay family unit. She made a guest appearance in 2012.

== Creation and casting ==
It was announced in December 2006 that Sophie and Hunter McKay would be arriving as part of the McKay family unit, headed by Justine and Callum McKay. Sophie was described as a "very pretty, popular fifteen year old. A typical teen consumer of any new product or trend, she's a total fashion victim." She was described as close with her brother; "Hunter's her best friend, her role model and the one person who's always been there for her." Crossman quit the role to move to Los Angeles, making her last appearance in March 2011. But expressed interest in returning in the future. Crossman returned for an unannounced cameo on 25 May 2012 to mark the shows 20th anniversary.

== Storylines ==
Sophie arrived in December 2006 and instantly got into trouble with customs much to parents - Callum (Peter Mochrie) and Justine's (Laurie Foell) horror. She started a blog in 2007 and attracted the attention of tourettes sufferer, Angus (Elliot Christensen-Yule) but became smitten with Nate (Damien Harrison) who she lost her virginity to after wrongfully accusing Luke Durville (Gerald Urquhart) of being a serial killer. The two broke up when it turned out Nate was gay and had a crush on Sophie's brother - Hunter (Lee Donoghue). Sophie ended up in a relationship with Angus but they broke up when she had a one-night stand with paraplegic - Tane Samuels (Dominic Ona-Ariki).

In 2009 she became head girl of Ferndale High and after briefly dating bully - Orlando (Chris Maclennan-Jones), Sophie started to date Daniel Potts (Ido Drent). However an increasingly unhappy Sophie started a secret affair with older man Kieran Mitchell (Adam Rickitt). The relationship was eventually outed to the family and the two got engaged. Despite the intervention of Kieran's brother - Sean (Thijs Morris), Sophie and Kieran married in March 2010. Sophie started to lose trust in Kieran and the couple separated, only for Kieran to die. A devastated Sophie got back together with Daniel and took up a career in registration. In 2011, after jealousy over Daniel's ex - Jill (Natalie Medlock) and her worldwide knowledge, Sophie kindly broke up with Daniel and departed Ferndale to travel the world.

In 2012 Callum announced Sophie had finished traveling the world. She made a brief appearance on 25 May 2012, when her father left the hospital to take him to visit Hunter.

== Reception ==
The character was well received, winning Crossman "Best rising star" in the Throng Shortland Street fan awards 2007. Sophie won runner up in; "Hottest female", "Best Dressed Character" and "Most Boring Storyline". In 2009 Sophie took out "Hottest Female" and "Favourite Actress". She also won runner up in "Favourite Female Character" and "Best Dressed Character". The Sophie and Kieran storyline was also noted as a highlight and fans wished for Sophie to star in a sex scandal storyline in 2010. In 2010 Sophie won "Favourite Female Character" and "Best Dressed Character". She also won runner up for "Best Hair". In 2011 Sophie took out "Hottest Female", "Most Missed Character" and favourite non-dead character to return. Sophie won runner up in "Favourite Female Character" and "Best Hair".

The 2010 storyline that saw Sophie stalked by her university lecturer, saw complaints from the family of Sophie Elliott who was murdered in 2008 by her former university lecturer whom she had been dating. Producer Steven Zanoski defended the storyline, calling it a "classic".
