= Huia Samuels =

- Shortland Street character
- Portrayed by: Nicola Kawana
- Duration: 2005–2006
- First appearance: 24 March 2005
- Last appearance: 11 October 2006
- Introduced by: Harriet Crampton
In-universe information
- Other names: Huia Valentine
- Occupation: Chief Executive Officer of Shortland Street Hospital (2006); Business Manager; Personal Assistant
- Mother: Kuini Samuels
- Grandmothers: Mareikura Samuels
- Uncles: Wiremu Samuels; Mitch Samuels
- Aunts: Liz Arthur; Dottie Samuels; Miri Samuels
- Nephews: Tane Samuels; Wiremu Potae
- Nieces: Esther Samuels
- First cousins: TK Samuels

Huia Samuels is a fictional character on the New Zealand soap opera Shortland Street who was portrayed by Nicola Kawana from early 2005 to late 2006. Initially a recurring character, she soon joined the core cast before being axed and killed off in a high-profile terrorism storyline.

Huia arrived in March 2005 to replace Nick Harrison as Business Manager and begin a review of the hospital's departments. Following the departure of Andrew Solomon she became the chief executive officer of hospital. She then embarked on a high-profile love triangle storyline when she started a relationship with Craig Valentine (Renato Bartolomei), pitting her against his unrequited love – Sarah Potts (Amanda Billing). Her relationship with Craig led to a motherlike relationship with his teenage daughter Scarlett (Nicole Thomson) and it was not long before the family unit expanded with the arrival of Huia's cousin TK (Benjamin Mitchell). Huia's final storyline saw her breakup with Craig, only to become pregnant after a one-night stand and end up dying after entering a car rigged with an explosive.

Huia was a well received character and her death quickly became iconic amongst the soap's fanbase and critics. Her introduction marked the start of the prominent Samuels family.

== Creation and casting ==
The character of Huia Samuels was introduced as a minor guest character, with Nicola Kawana cast in a multi-episode contract. Produces enjoyed Kawana's portrayal and opted to renew her contract; expanding the character to the core cast. However the following year Producers axed the character after deciding storylines for Huia had "dried up". Kawana was reportedly upset at this decision and did not attend set in protest for numerous days. Huia's exit storyline saw her discover she was pregnant, only to die in an explosion after entering a car rigged with a bomb.

== Storylines ==
Huia arrived to the hospital in early 2005 to replace the departed Nick Harrison (Karl Burnett) as Business Manager. Her role would see her manage the accounts and audit departments within the hospital. She instantly got on well with Craig Valentine (Renato Bartolomei) and his daughter Scarlett (Nicole Thomson). The hospital's CEO Andrew Solomon (Paolo Rotondo) resigned and Huia ended up getting the job. She began to date Craig and started to suspect the clinic manager Hamish (Phil Brown) of fraud. Craig discovered that Huia had previously been married to Buddy Haanui (Antonio Te Maioha) and their relationship began to sour. Craig broke it off but whilst on a business trip in Rotorua, the two had a one-night stand and Huia fell pregnant. She decided to leave the country after abuse from Craig's girlfriend Sarah (Amanda Billing) but decided to stay after pleads from Craig. However whilst on a way to a meeting, Huia borrowed Ant Richards' (Michael Morris) car and upon turning on the exhaust, died in a massive explosion that had been rigged underneath.

The car bomb was revealed to be from pharmaceutical company Scott Spear and placed in Ant's car after he stole documents from them. The storyline was again visited in 2008 when Craig began to investigate the company alongside Justine Jones (Lucy Wigmore). Huia's friend Toni Warner (Laura Hill) died as part of a result of faulty drugs created by Scott Spear and Craig was later murdered by Scott Spear thugs. After faking her own death after nearly dying in another car bomb, Justine testified in court, which saw Scott Spear shut down for good.

== Character development ==
=== Death ===
With storylines having dried up with the character of Huia, producers decided to axe the character in a truly dramatic fashion. Producer Jason Daniel decided to have the character killed off in October rather than the December cliffhanger so as that the storylines gain momentum. A storyline running alongside parallel to Huia's was that of corrupt pharmaceutical company and its annoyance at Ant Richards for stealing the documents. Daniel decided to kill off the character of Huia with the subject of terrorism, stating; "We're living in a world now where bits of terrorism pop up all over the place, who would've thought Bali a couple of years ago? There have also been some scary incidents in schools, not just in the US but here, too. You look at the reports of how teachers are treated by their students, so I don't think any of it is unbelievable. We don't want to create a precedent but we always like to look at the world around us and think, 'What if?' " The writing team consulted The New Zealand police and bomb squads to accurately portray the bombing. Daniel tried to create the illusion on screen that Ant was going to be killed off, saying; "The predictable story would have been that Ant was the victim, obviously, he was intended to be." The storyline saw Huia fall pregnant following a one-night stand with ex fiancé Craig Valentine. She decides to leave the city only to be talked round by Craig. While going to a meeting, she borrows Ant's car and following an argument with Sarah turns on the ignition, only to be killed in a firery explosion that injures numerous bystanders including Sarah and Tania Jeffries. Daniel was pleased with the result, saying; "Baghdad comes to Shortland Street, I don't think anyone will have seen that coming." The episode was followed up by a week of aftermath episodes, including the initial aftermath and then several episodes involving the grief and coming to terms of the death, then Huia's funeral at her marae and finally a storyline that saw news reporters arriving to the hospital.

== Reception ==
Producers ensured the character of Huia and her cousin, TK Samuels (Benjamin Mitchell), were accurate reflections of Maori culture, with Jason Daniel stating, "It’s important that we show a spectrum. Currently the audience reaction to Huia is interesting. She’s often regarded as somewhat cold, tough and uncompromising when in fact if you look at a lot of situations her character has been in, she’s mostly right. She’s a very moral, uncompromising character. I think even the fact that we have a Maori woman who is the CEO of a hospital is in itself radical." Huia was a highly favourable character for fans, with numerous positive comments on messageboards following her death suggesting she was "much-loved". In the Throng Shortland Street Fan Awards 2006, fans voted Huia's death as "Best Exit" and "Favourite Moment". It also won runner up for "Saddest Moment" alongside her funeral. However fans were disappointed that Huia's killers were never revealed nor caught. In 2012, Huia's death was voted by fans as one of the shows most iconic moments.
