= Shortland Street cliffhangers =

Suspenseful moment in a New Zealand TV show

In Shortland Street's 2010 cliffhanger, Callum McKay covers Rachel McKenna and Chris Warner from a huge explosion.

The annual Shortland Street cliffhanger is a storyline at the end of each year's season that leaves behind a question to be solved the following year. This technique is used to lure viewers back after the long summer break. Cliffhangers are usually carefully written so that storylines from throughout the year come to a head and interconnect. The following is a list by year of Shortland Street's cliffhangers.

== 1992 ==
Though there was no break this year as Shortland Street screened throughout the holidays, Alison Raynor discovers she is pregnant with ex-fiancé Chris Warner's child, while Marj Neilson meets up with Jane, the daughter she gave up for adoption.

== 1993 ==
Again there was no break as the show screened throughout the holidays but the hospital staff faced a difficult choice when Steve, Gina, Hone and Marj all held New Year's Eve parties - and competed for guests. They were all disappointed when Alex McKenna invited everyone to celebrate at the local bar, Kennedy's. Marj was pleasantly surprised to find lover Laurie at her door.

== 1994 ==
Jenny Harrison discovers that she is pregnant. Hone Ropata accidentally punches someone to death to break up a fight in an examination room. Stuart Neilson objects at the wedding of Kirsty Knight and Lionel Skeggins.

== 1995 ==
Once again Shortland Street screened throughout the holiday period, but on Christmas Day, a truck driver drove into the hospital, knocking down Carmen Roberts and Kirsty. Kirsty was put into a coma and Carmen received a small injury to the head. Guy proposed to her and she died from a brain aneurysm moments later. Kirsty regained consciousness but suffered extreme amnesia and she told Lionel she could not remember loving him. Their marriage was over.

== 1996 ==
Shortland Street took a break from the end of November 1996 until late January 1997, the longest ever break for the show.

In an hour long special, David finally tracked down Ellen in Fiji where she revealed that she’s pregnant. Nick and Caroline discovered the truth behind the clinic’s dodgy waste management contractor, however Caroline found herself being threatened by Mark. Following Rangi and Rachel breaking up for good, a drunken Rachel attempted to storm off, however passed out in the driver’s seat and accidentally put her car in reverse leaving Rangi pinned in his wheelchair between the rear of the car and the garage wall, breathing in exhaust fumes. Kirsty visited her ex-husband Lionel and confessed her true feelings. The year ends with Kirsty and Lionel kissing.

Kirsty and Lionel after the plane crash.

== 1997 ==
Shortland Street took a six-week break from early December 1997 to mid January 1998.

Jenny realised that her fugitive husband Ian Seymour was the mysterious good Samaritan who had rescued her from a mugger. Johnny finds Tiffany collapsed at home, rushed her to HDU, and admitted that he loves her. Rangi realised that Donna may be his half sister. Caroline is found guilty of murder. As Kirsty and Lionel rushed back from Wellington in a light plane to be there for Caroline’s verdict, Kirsty accepted that Lionel is in love Caroline and gives them her blessing as their plane’s engine failed and crashed in the countryside.

== 1998 ==
Oscar's bad deeds began to catch up with him. Fergus attacked Oscar after learning he had raped Minnie and Rachel discovered Oscar had defrauded the hospital of a million dollars.

Lionel proposed to MacKenzie, unaware of her villainous activities. Oscar himself was nowhere to be found - until Minnie discovered him in Ellen and David's dining room, apparently dead.

Meanwhile, Minnie's mother Ellen (who'd just learned of her daughter's rape) and Mike were looking for Minnie, hoping to find her on the harbour cruise they'd planned. The boat hit a reef and began to sink and when Mike and Ellen tried to jump to safety Ellen hit her head. Mike frantically tried to find her underwater...

== 1999 ==
Wave was shocked that her friend Minnie was using guys for their money.

Sofia Martinez arrived, announcing she was the new Director of Shortland Street.

== 2000 ==
From the year 2000 onwards Shortland Street took a shorter break of four weeks every year.

== 2001 ==
Rachel is kidnapped by a manic Jack and taken to his remote cabin, leaving Chris to think Rachel has abandoned him. Patricia receives an invite to Jack and Rachel’s “wedding”. As Nick prepares to move London, he and Waverley confess their love for each other. Mihi discovers her mother, Te Hana, kissing Geoff Greenlaw. Barb‘s Christmas Party ends in disaster as Marshall’s illegal drug lab explodes and leaves many of the hospital’s staff in jeopardy - including Toni, Judy, Adam, Barb, Waverley, and Nick.

== 2002 ==
2002 saw Waverley be diagnosed with breast cancer and Shannon announce that she was pregnant - to Tama.

Rachel and Chris's relationship was on the rocks and as her alcoholism took control she moved into bartender Zac's place, and nearly drowned in his pool. Chris called it quits and decided to pursue his feelings for Donna. As they celebrated, Rachel was on her way over. Trying to talk to Chris on her mobile while driving drunk she had a serious car accident.

Back at the hospital prisoner Kurt Matakuare (Victor's nemesis) had been brought in for treatment. When everyone else was at the staff Christmas party he overpowered his guard and headed for Victor's office. When Adam tried to stop him, Kurt stabbed Adam with a scalpel leaving him bleeding in the deserted corridor too weak to cry out.

== 2003 ==
As Geoff's sister Delphi prepared to leave Ferndale for Sydney in the company of Dominic Warner, she was horrified to uncover new evidence suggesting Dom was Geoff Greenlaw's murderer.

Chris Warner's world crumbled around him when his girlfriend Donna discovered he'd been unfaithful, and he was arrested on trumped up charges of sexual molestation, both thanks to Dominic.

The on-again, off-again romance between Toni Thompson and Logan King was all on when Logan announced he'd left his wife for Toni.

At the Christmas party, Vinnie kissed Jesse.

Called to the scene, ambo officer Nelson Copeland tried frantically to get Anne out before the building was completely destroyed.

== 2004 ==
This year Shortland Street ran right up to Christmas and the year's final episode was a celebratory one-hour special that screened on Christmas Day.

The centerpiece was Tama and Shannon's romantic beach wedding, attended by old favourites Victor, Donna and Mihi. Across town, the hospital social club was performing A Christmas Carol charity and back at the Emergency Department, Sarah and Andrew were coping with the demands of the festive season.

The year ended with a combined wedding reception.

== 2005 ==
The final episode of 2005 saw Craig, Sarah, Judy and Maia form a band to entertain their colleagues at the hospital Christmas party it was all to raise money for a good cause.

Meanwhile, Tania Jeffries discovered that her boyfriend Mark Weston was a sex addict. During the Christmas party, Tania punched Mark and ended their relationship.

== 2006 ==
Sarah finally chooses TK Samuels over old flame Craig Valentine at the staff beach party.

Chris Warner begins his ill-fated affair with Justine Jones when they share a passionate kiss.

== 2007 ==
Serial killer Joey Henderson attempts to murder Tania Jeffries.

Chris locates Guy, Toni, Tuesday and Harry but they run away in the car and get in a huge car crash.

After months of murdering the hospital staff, the Ferndale Strangler is revealed to be nice guy nurse Joey Henderson when he attempts to strangle nurse Tania Jeffries.

== 2008 ==
Tania and boyfriend Kingi get kidnapped by the Whitetails Gang, meanwhile Ethan Pierce decides to ditch the country, stinging several people along the way. He arrives to his house, packs his gear and is then shot three times by an unseen assailant.

== 2009 ==
Plot lines converge at the Christmas party. Tania Jeffries reveals her mother, Yvonne Jeffries, is now dating her ex-boyfriend Ben Goodall. Tania, now inebriated, wanders away from the party. Sarah Potts goes home with Maxwell Avia, a decision that will further damage her relationship with her estranged husband, TK Samuels. Meanwhile, Brooke Freeman had previously admitted to TK that she loves him. Morgan Braithwaite and an inebriated Rachel McKenna leave the party early. While fleeing in his car, Kieran Mitchell is responsible for a hit and run death. He finds a passed out Rachel and frames her for the crime by placing her in the front seat of the car and buckling her seat belt. The final shot of the season reveals that Morgan had died from the hit and run.

== 2010 ==
Isaac learns that Luke Durville has been "taken care of" by the Russian gang that kidnapped him, Jennifer learns that Maia has a crush on her, Scotty brutally starts strangling fiancé Tracey Morrison on the dinner table and Evan accidentally starts a fire in Rachel & Callum's apartment block, trapping himself, Chris, Rachel and Callum inside.

The season ends with Callum jumping on top of passed out lovers, Chris and Rachel as another huge explosion rifts the building.

== 2011 ==
Schoolgirl - Ula Levi, realizes she is pregnant, Chris and Gabrielle start an affair and Hunter breaks into a pharmacy, desperate for a drug fix. Daniel and Jill try to stop Hunter, only for Daniel to get bludgeoned with a crowbar by Bailey and Jill to get stabbed by a security guard.

== 2012 ==
The wedding of Luke Durville and Bella Cooper goes ahead, after some last minute wedding jitters when Luke found out the day before that he has a brain tumor and most likely only has 3 months to live which he revealed to Bella and suggested they call off the wedding. On the day of the wedding, Chris Warner finds out that Gus Afeaki died and he later informs Vasa Levi. Before the wedding begins, Zac Smith who was previously revealed to the audience as the person targeting TK Samuels, spikes a drink and tricks Josh Gallagher in to giving it to TK. After the wedding Murray Cooper tells his estranged wife Wendy that he wishes to get back together and Wendy agrees to consider it. Under the influence of the spiked drink, TK starts behaving noticeably strangely and gets into his car to chase Josh when he sees him leaving. TK drives into the surrounding group of people with Murray and Wendy in TK's way.

The season ends with TK colliding with Murray as he pushes Wendy out of the way.

== 2013 ==
The final episode for 2013 was screened midweek and was an hour-long episode.

After Vasa and Travis break up Vasa finds Travis has over $30,000 in cash despite having declared bankruptcy days earlier and leaving both Murray and Nate out of pocket. Vasa manages to get Travis to agree to half of the money and the Cooper's are paid back but not Nate. Ula is called to an Ambulance call out to Vasa's address, Ula rings Vasa in advance but receives no answer, the call out is due to a body found in the car park of Vasa'a apartment which happens to be Travis's body. Vasa and Vinnie are seen coming back into the house drunk but have no idea what has happened to Travis.

Brooke finally has a kidney transplant, a kidney becomes available after Dayna's mother is involved in a car accident. Dayna's mother initially arrived in hospital in a stable condition but Bree and Josh chose to drug her so that she was brain dead and her kidney could be used. Initially Dayna had refused to go ahead with allowing her mother's kidney to be used but agreed at the last minute. The Cooper family agree to take care of Dayna and her brother.

Josh is arrested at the end of the second to last episode of 2013 on a charge of intent to harm for tampering with vitamins given to Wendy.

Chris plans a Christmas party at the Warner family batch. In the lead up Chris and Rachel have run into problems, Chris is wanting to marry Rachel and have children Rachel initially doesn't want either. Grace Kwan has also indicated she wants a baby to which Chris offers to be the father to but stay in a relationship with Rachel. At the end of the episode Rachel accepts Chris's proposal and accepts that Chris and Grace may have a child together.

Nate tries to set Dallas up for a fall, as payback for Dallas suggesting Nate play Santa, Nate finds a ring and places it in a gift-box with a note and hands it to Emma. When Emma sees the ring and reads the note she instantly thinks Dallas was proposing and is keen on the idea but Dallas is surprised and instantly responds with the words "as if." This leads to Emma and Dallas not talking to each other and Kylie also mad at Nate for playing such a prank. After unsuccessfully trying to talk Emma around, Dallas and Kylie are talking together and this leads to Dallas and Kylie kissing only to have Emma catch them both out. Josh is released on bail and places a home made bomb on a timer underneath Chris's batch. Josh then crashes the party saying the police had dropped the charges and he was free and made an attempt to take Bella away with him. Bella was not interested in having anything more to do with Josh and Harper, TK and Roimata did everything to keep Josh away from Bella. After a long altercation between Josh and the rest of the group Roimata discovers the bomb underneath the bach.

The season ends with the bach exploding with everyone's lives at risk.

At the end of the episode a trailer is played showing Rachel, Roimata, Chris, TK, Emma and Josh in a funeral like scene. The audience are told one of these people will die, the audience are given clues as to who will survive.

The campaign "Shortland Street Clues" was launched after the episode with one clue on who lives/dies given to fans each day until the show resumed.

== 2014 ==
The final episode of 2014 was screened on Thursday, in a double episode/one-hour special. Boyd, TK, Garrett, Murray, Vinnie and Dallas hesitantly agree to participate in the calendar set competition by Kylie and Leanne, in which the winner becomes the front cover. The final two are narrowed down and Dallas beats out Vinnie through audience appreciation.

Meanwhile, Rachel is still trapped in the elevator with Shelley, who threatens to attack her with a knife if she does not get her termination pills. Rachel calls Boyd and references the name 'Derek Foster' - the detective responsible for Toby's father's death. Initially, Boyd doesn't understand the call but Kylie explains who he is and both Boyd and Chris rush to the hospital, sensing something is wrong.

Chris and Boyd begin to search for Rachel, while Leanne calls security and orders them to search for Rachel. Shelley refuses to wait any longer and forces Rachel to a drug room to find the pills herself. She repeatedly says she does not have access to a drug room, but a door is left open by a fellow nurse, granting access into the room.

Rachel begins looking for the pills when Chris, Boyd and the security guards arrive outside the room. Chris is granted access after he states he is a doctor. He asks Shelley questions and asks whose choice it is to abort the baby. After reassurance that everything will be okay, she lets Rachel go, doesn't take the pills and is taken away by the police.

While at the calendar competition, Ula breaks up with Garrett, saying he is trying to be something he isn't. After claiming victory, Dallas calls Bella but to no avail. Dallas and Ula converse as they both relate to each other in which both their relationships have ended.

While being treated in ED, Chris and Rachel share a moment together, and Chris sees this as a golden opportunity to reunite with her, although Rachel is only grateful and does not want anything more. The following morning, she is treated to a large bouquet of flowers and expensive jewellery. Chris and now Harry continue to misread these actions. Chris forces Rachel over to his house where she tells him again that she does not want to get back together.

Back at the hospital, Shelley escapes from the police and subsequently runs into Nicole who is knocked over. She is rushed to ED but is cleared of any damage to her or the baby. After the calendar competition Nicole goes into labour.

The season ends when Chris enters Rachel's apartment and sees Rachel with Garrett and is shocked, Dallas invites a mystery woman over to his place, and Nicole gives birth to a baby boy (Pele), only to suffer a seizure right after, leaving Vinnie and Leanne devastated.

The campaign "Love Hurts" followed and fans were given the chance to write endings for the story lines in the Finale (Nicole's Seizure, Dallas' mystery woman, Chris and Rachel's break up and Harper anguish over TK and Boyd) to win an exclusive perfume of the same name.

== 2015 ==
The 2015 cliffhanger aired on Monday 14 December as a 90-minute triple episode.

Dr. Drew McCaskill discovers some discrepancies with recent finances and accounting and accuses Margaret Hannah. Victoria and Curtis also take Margaret's side of the story, with Curtis threatening Drew if he goes to Rachel, Virginia also becomes angry with Drew when she believes that he is trying to get with a 15-year-old patient. Gareth Hutchins sneaks into the hospital, takes out the security guard and the cameras, and confronts Drew in his study, seeking revenge for Drew's intervention that involved Gareth's daughter, Millie, to be placed in foster care. He shoots Drew twice and tries to take Kylie hostage to get him out of the hospital.

After attempts to escape via the underground carpark and ambulance bay are foiled, Gareth enters the hospital cafe and takes the staff Christmas party hostage. Michael manages to escape with Vinnie's call, but when Gareth wants Stevie as a shield, Len Cooper lunges forward and confronts him despite still recovering from a shoulder injury. He is shot point-blank in the stomach and passes away having lost a lot of blood. After Len dies, Gareth again wants Stevie, with Bella resisting to obey.

Boyd makes a last-minute dash to the hospital with best man Chris Warner having left the wedding rings in his office desk. However he becomes trapped inside as the police and Armed Offenders Squad surround the hospital. Boyd and Harper are forced to postpone their wedding. Amidst the chaos, Dayna was late to the wedding with George, and had no idea about the situation at Shortland Street, they got married, knowing the Coopers would still have reservations about them getting married.

The season ends when Mo and Vinnie rush Gareth, causing Gareth to fire shots and within firing range were Bella, Stevie, Wendy, Murray, Vinnie, Mo, Jack, Boyd and Leanne. Dayna and George are pronounced husband and wife, and an unknown person picks up the gun and shoots Drew.

The campaign "The Living Moment" was launched on TV and through the website - www.thelivingmoment.co.nz. Each week a password was given on Facebook/Snapchat/Instagram for an exclusive peek into the lives of a character affect. Photos, 111 Calls, Evidence, Christmas Cards and Maps were also unlocked with the password.

When unscrambled the 5 password spelled TIME WAITS FOR NO MAN.

There were four suspects as to who shot Drew at the end

Margaret, Curtis, Victoria and Virginia were the four suspects

In the middle of 2016, it is revealed to be Victoria, revealing her guilt in her final moments

Shortland Street resumed on January 18, 2016.

== 2016 ==
Trina dies from wounds inflicted from Hayden. TK takes Trina's phone and calls Hayden who is upset about Trina dying. TK and Kylie head to TK's house while they are there Hayden abducts Kylie and forces TK to go with him. They go to a distant junkyard and Hayden shoots TK in the arm and forces him to dig his grave.

Meanwhile, Chris, Finn and Sass meet Frank, the eldest out of the triplets. Frank decides to go to the Christmas party and spends the day at the hospital, where he takes a liking for Esther, Finn's girlfriend.

Elsewhere, Glen, Lucy and Ali leave Ferndale for Glen's secret bach as they believe they are not safe. DI Cochrane is secretly hunting them down on the way, and when Ali believes the three aren't safe at the bach either, they drive elsewhere, and Ali gets sick. They nearly bump into another car and they go crashing down a hill.

At the Christmas party, Nicole confesses her love to Ruby and Damo tries to take on the role of DJ. Sass finds out Damo is the secret DJ and knocks him out, and Damo is replaced by rapper Leroy and Blue Nathan as the DJ. Frank confesses to Esther that he likes her while Finn overhears this, Finn is angered by this.

DI Cochrane finally finds the car with Glen, Lucy and Ali in it. Ali has managed to get out but as DI Cochrane lights the car and drowns it with petrol. Ali pulls Lucy out but fails to get Glen out.

Hayden then threatens to kill Kylie, and then TK and Hayden engage in a fight.

The season ends as the car blows up with Glen in it and Ali and Lucy barely escaping the car, Finn tries to punch Frank in the face but misses and hits Leanne, and TK ends the fight by drowning Hayden.

The 2016 finale was followed by the "Past the point of no Return" campaign which will continue through the year of the shows 25th Anniversary. Three videos were released showed the three characters most affected by Ferndale's Christmas - Lucy, TK & Nicole. Each week a video was launched on the shows Facebook page showing memories of the past, parts of the ad, and the character's solemn face.

== 2017 ==
A shooter hired by Mason Coutts attempts to shoot Finn after Finn receives numerous death threats. Frank jumps in front of the bullet and is shot, but after extensive care, he recovers. The shooter then enters the hospital and then attempts shooting Finn again, but is killed by Chris.

Esther is then kidnapped and is threatened to have her throat slit by one of the prisoners who killed his own son.

A prison bus that was transferring prisoners to a high state max security facility, which is holding Mason, 'deliberately' crashes and Mason escapes. Sass went on a boat with Jasper, only to find that Mason had hijacked the boat, forcing Sass to either sail with him or die trying to make it back to Ferndale. Later, in a heated exchange, Mason kills his own son, Jasper, and then tries to kill Sass, who he accuses of turning Jasper against him. Mason is then shot with a harpoon by Sass and falls overboard, dragging her into the water with him. Eventually, Mason dies of his injuries.

Meanwhile, Leanne takes on the role of Santa during Christmas celebrations, but when the costume is supposedly sabotaged by Dawn (leaving Leanne with a red rash on her face), Leanne sabotages Dawn's Trifle by adding vodka to it, which is completely demolished by Ali in attempt to make Dawn feel better. Drunk, he goes in to kiss Dawn, only to vomit all over her.

The season ends with the boat travelling away, leaving Sass treading water in the middle of sea, Virginia is found unconscious at the bottom of Chris' stairs, and Esther goes into cardiac arrest after escaping from the prisoners car, with Curtis and Finn doing everything in their power to save her.

== 2018 ==
Jack, Mo, Kate, Chris, Leanne and Damo were to all go on a private plane charter. Unfortunately, Leanne had a vision of a plane crash, and she and Damo bailed out. A stranger Denise then joined them on the private charter.

When we last saw Kylie and Dylan, Kylie caused a car to crash after learning about Dylan's murderous past. Kylie frees Dylan from the car and Dylan goes into ED. Nurse Claire is angered by the fact serial rapist Ian Reid has been stabbed in prison and taken into ED. Kylie changes the message on Damo's Christmas lights to cause a well-timed power cut, and an unknown figure (which is revealed to be Claire in September 2019) enters Ian Reid's ward and stabs him.

The plane crashes into the middle of a forest, and the pilot dies. Father and son, Mo and Jack are left with serious injuries. Jack has a broken leg. With Jack's life hanging, Chris and Mo try to find a cell phone tower, Mo blames Chris for the death of his late daughter Pixie. Mo's injuries come to serious terms, but not trying to seem weak, they carry on back to camp.

Back at the hospital, Nurse Dawn is spreading Christmas joy. She is unaware that her husband, Ali, has been diagnosed with brain cancer.

When Chris and Mo return to the camp, they discover Denise has been using the secret satellite phone, she then threatens Chris, Mo and Kate with a flare gun, Mo charges at Denise and shoots the flare gun in the air, Denise punches Mo in his injured area and runs off just as the rescue plane comes down.

Kylie goes into Dylan's ward and tells him that Ian Reid died, then Dylan confesses all of his murders and then Kylie uses a kiss to drug Dylan and he says to Kylie that she is perfect. She then tells him she is not perfect and then suffocates him.

The season ends when Mo, Coughs up blood onto Kate's shirt and hears Pixie before passing out, Jack is weak and his life is hanging in the balance, Kylie is now a two time murderer and Damo is squished under a Christmas tree.

== 2019 ==
Tim Myers kidnaps Zara and straps a bomb to her as revenge for Zara causing the breakup between Tim and Shareez. He takes her to the hospital with him, and gives another bomb to River, wrapped up as a "Christmas gift" to blow up the hospital.

Meanwhile, Cece, Sophia, Dawn and Shareez go on a "men-free" bush walk, however that takes a turn when they unexpectedly meet Dawn's ex-prisoner boyfriend, Jake. As the three make their way back to their car, Jake gets shot by two hunters, they run and are forced to hide in a shed.

Tim takes Zara into Chris' office and holds Zara, Chris and Boyd hostage. Chris tries to calm Tim down but Tim knocks him out and takes Zara and Boyd hostage. Chris tells the police to let Tim leave as he knows they have a bomb. Phoenix's wife goes into labour, and Eddie helps Chris to make it in time to see the arrival of his new granddaughter, Amelie.

In the shed, Shareez discovers that Jake has thousands of dollars' worth of weed, and then two hunters, Bronnie and Pete, come inside. They take the five outside and threaten to shoot Sophia and Jake. One of the hunters, Pete, has thoughts of raping Sophia instead of being ordered to shoot her.

Tim drives to where Shareez is, convinced by Boyd and Zara, that Shareez still loves him. He parks there and can't get hold of her. Boyd confesses to Zara about his feelings for her, and Tim threatens to blow up Zara and Boyd. Meanwhile at the hospital, Louis King is convinced that River is up to something, and talks to Dr Marty Walker. He hacks into River's MyLife account and finds out what Tim and River are doing with River's "present" and he and River fight, and River decides to turn himself in. Damo, setting up a secret Santa, accidentally takes River's "gift" to the secret Santa.

Tim gives up trying to find Shareez, and the secret santa with the bomb takes place, and the gift with the bomb gets handed to Pele, Nicole's child. Boyd manages to get the vest of Zara and they attempt to flee the ambulance.

The season ends when Marty stops Pele from opening the gift, Shareez and Cece rush Bronnie and Sophia lights Pete on fire, Kylie and TK embrace and are interrupted by Frank Warner and Tim blows up the ambulance just as Zara and Boyd got out, leaving fans to question who survives.

== 2020 ==
Brady Nash returns to the hospital and confronts TK about how his arrest caused him to lose his family and his job. Frank then confronts Braydon before he can attack TK, and leaves for the bach, with Brady chasing after him.

Meanwhile, at the IV, Leanne holds a Christmas dinner for all her family and friends. Graham gives Leanne a speech, and she runs off, because she is hiding her true feelings for Rosalyn (Maeve's mother) and Esther surprises Eddie by returning with Kiwa. Desi and Damo also arrive, with Desi heavily intoxicated. Maeve discovers that Theo is still in love with her, when Maeve is sent a gift saying "Forever yours, Theo xx"

Drew and Harper hold a Christmas dinner at their place, with Boyd, Zara and the twins. When the kids have all gone to bed, the adults get very high in Drew's hot tub. Boyd gets the worst of it, and falls asleep on Drew's couch. He is awoken by the noises of walking in Drew's corridor.

At the bach, Chris begins to contemplate his life, and is confronted by ghosts of Phoenix and Mo, saying that he needs to stay and look out for his family. Mo indicates to Chris that Frank is in trouble back at the bach, and he runs back up and discovers Frank being held at gunpoint by Brady, who takes both Chris and Frank down to the basement and holds them hostage. Chris tries to convince Brady against what he is doing but it doesn't work.

Leanne confesses her feelings towards Rosalyn, and Dawn confesses her feelings towards Prince. Leanne and Rosalyn share a kiss, and Graham walks in on it. Meanwhile, Dawn and Prince enter the flat to discover that Dawn's dog, Barry has had puppies. Graham collapses after seeing Leanne and Rosalyn kiss. The sight causes Desi to leave the bar drunk and when Damo tries to stop her, she assaults him. Boyd then checks on the kids, and discovers only Marley and Billy there, Wondering where Romulus and Remus are, he leaves the room and discovers the front door of Drew's house open.

The season ends as Boyd runs out to find Eve driving off with his twins, Graham dies surrounded by family and friends, Desi drives away from the IV heavily intoxicated, and Chris is shot in the chest by Brady while trying to protect Frank.

== 2021 ==
After a stabbing incident at the women's prison, Carla Crozier is admitted into Shortland Street, causing fears for Nicole (whom Carla kidnapped her son, Pele earlier in the year) and Vincent (a victim of Carla's). Maeve is Carla's nurse, and she threatens Carla many times, going as far as slapping her.

On the morning of Tess and Tom's wedding, Tess's mother, Megan, feels unwell, and the doctors discover the tumor in her bowel has grown some more. She begs the doctors to let her go to her daughter's wedding and they let her. Dawn arrives at the wedding venue to find Ollie (Tom's best man) trying to get the wedding to be more interesting by drinking whiskey with Tom, but Dawn drinks the whole thing in one go. Tom and Tess's wedding is a success nevertheless, and they go back to the IV to celebrate.

Carla attempts to hypnotise Maeve and Vincent while they are treating her, which doesn't work. However, she sees Damo and hypnotises him into freeing her from her hospital bed. She assaults the guard watching her and suddenly, Nicole has gone missing. Maeve and Vincent try to find her and they give up. Vincent goes to change in the locker room but Carla surprises him by hiding there and choking him. Luckily, Maeve isn't far behind, and threatens to kill Carla by lethal injection if she doesn't let Vincent go.

At the wedding reception at the IV, there are many heartfelt speeches, and everyone has a huge dance. Francesca decides to go home and Samira follows, and the two kiss. The dance is interrupted by Richard (Tess's stepfather), who stabs Megan. Tom and Tess try to fend him off, but both fail and are stabbed.

Maeve and Vincent drag Carla to Chris's office, where she has been hiding Nicole. Maeve tries to go and free Nicole, but Carla gets a hold of Maeve and prepares to lethally inject her.

The season ends with Megan collapsing from a stab wound, Tess collapsing from a stab wound to the chest, and Maeve is trapped by Carla.

== 2022 ==
A wildfire from the forest Mount Otemauri rampages its way through Ferndale, towards Shortland Street Hospital.

TK orders the hospital to evacuate everyone except for those who cannot be moved, and he brings together a team of people to help those who can't leave. Rahu's brother, who is a firefighter, is admitted and must undergo surgery. The surgery cannot go ahead, so Chris operates in resus to stop the bleeding so that he can get transferred to Central.

Throughout this, Drew and Nicole are performing surgery on Esther, and have to stay put. They are told to hurry up with the surgery as the fire gets closer, and eventually transfer her away on a helicopter. Drew has tried to call Harper multiple times throughout the surgery, whom Harper is at home with the kids. Harper has gone off of her post-natal depression medicine, and is spiralling out of control, which causes her to hit Marley. Harper then decides to leave town, and leave Drew, Billy, Marley and baby Skye behind.

Meanwhile, Dawn discovers Logan unconscious after he was attacked by Dawn's boyfriend and youth pastor of Brightshine Church, Scott. Logan is resuscitated and Dawn is told by Scott that Maeve attempted to attack Logan. Dawn finds out when Logan wakes up that Scott was the one who attacked him. Maeve also hears about this, and goes after Scott, who she then discovers killed her son, Wilder, not long before this. Maeve finds Scott and brutally attacks him. Scott tries to reach for a fire extinguisher as the fire gets closer, but Rebekah comes in and beats Scott with it. The hospital is then caught in the fire, and everyone desperately breaks out, to discover the hospital, and nearby structures in flames.

The season ends as Harper sets off on her motorbike, Drew is standing on the street heartbroken, Nicole discovers the IV bar engulfed in flames and the staff and patients of Shortland Street watch the hospital go up in flames.

== 2023 ==
While previous years had staged their dramatic climax at Christmas, Shortland Street’s 2023 cliffhanger joined hospital staff as they rang in the new year. While a devastating fire had claimed the hospital at the close of 2022, the end of 2023 promised intensity of a different kind. Going into the final week of the year, several storylines were set to come to a head. Viliami To’a (Theo David) and Madonna Diaz (Marianne Infante) finally tied the knot in a ceremony that reflected their respective Filipino-Samoan cultures, but tensions simmered; the love triangle between Harry Warner (Xander Manktelow), his ex-girlfriend Stella Reihana (Tatum Warren-Ngata), and her new partner Rahu Parata (Zak Martin) remained lively; Whitley-McCaskill matriarch Harper (Ria Vandervis) was hospitalised after an apparent home intrusion; and CEO Esther Samuels (Ngahuia Piripi) struggled as her husband Dr Marty Walker (Scott Smart) battled his addiction to pharmaceutical wonder-drug Zeclastian (‘Z’).

As the new year approached, one agent of chaos was rugby coach Owen Hillier (David Capstick). Responsible for pushing Harper down the stairs after she discovered his history of child sexual abuse, Owen’s appearance unsettled Vili, who immediately recognised Owen as his childhood abuser. Upon putting two-and-two together, Owen ignited the ire of both Vili and Harper’s husband Drew McCaskill (Ben Barrington), with the two impulsively taking Owen hostage in Drew’s basement after a brawl.

Another malevolent figure turned out to be Harry Warner. When a hoard of Z addicts – referred to as ‘Zombies’ by the staff – caused a violent incident in ED, Harry and Rahu saved the day. But Rahu had discovered Harry’s little secret – that his medical credentials were fake, and his surgical career built on lies. Confronting Harry as the pair treated one of the Zombies, Harry struggled to talk his way out of Rahu’s accusation. When the patient attacked Rahu suddenly and savagely, Harry watched on. Rahu was rushed to surgery, with Stella initially taking the lead, but ceding control to Harry. The surgery would prove complicated, with Rahu sustaining significant bleeding and internal injury.

Meanwhile, multiple characters found themselves on a Dr Love Boat, with Chris (Michael Galvin) hosting a New Years’ bash in typical Warner style on a yacht at the Auckland viaduct. Onboard, Monique Strutter (Courtenay Louise) broke off her sham engagement to Logan Barnes (Carlos Muller); returning faces Kate Hannah (Laurel Devenie), Boyd Rolleston (Sam Bunkall), Desi Schmidt (Kura Forrester), and Damo Johnson (Grant Lobban) mixed and mingled; Esther and Marty at last seemed to be in a good place; and Selina To’a (Bella Kalolo) and Chris resolved their squabbles to enter the new year as a couple, with Chris revealing he had thrown the whole party for her.

As the countdown to midnight began, viewers were treated to several sensational moments. Monique fell into bed with mysterious partygoer Ihaia Stone (Evander Brown). Madonna and Father Gabriel gave into passion on the To’a-Diaz family couch. Marty, succumbing to temptation, shot up with Z before collapsing on the deck of the boat. Having broken free, a cricket-bat wielding Owen snuck up from the basement and knocked Vili to the floor. And Harry, the prodigal son of the Warner family, stood over the body of his ex-girlfriend’s new flame, witness to a death that he allowed to occur so that his secret would be safe.

== 2024 ==
The cliffhanger for 2024 was set up and played out over 6 nights, culminating in a one-hour special on Monday 23 December. The finale also marked the end of the show broadcasting 5 nights a week, with an extended break and reduction in production output resulting in show airing only 3 nights a week in 2025 from 10 February.

Whilst Nicole is initially acquitted of murder, she realises that she did indeed kill Louisa. Not being able to live with the guilt, Nicole confesses and is arrested leaving behind a distraught Maeve and Pele. Harry Warner returned to Auckland to face justice with his brothers and Uncle Guy by his side. Chris attempts to dissolve the Warner Family Trust believing it to be cursed but is out voted, with Guy invoking the incapacity clause and taking over control. Madonna realises she is pregnant, but who is the father - Vili or Thaddeus? Meanwhile as Harper and Drew prepare to move to New York they are involved in a serious motorcycle accident. Drew seemed to be the more severely injured and was rushed into surgery. Chris is able to save Drew, but the ED Team were less fortunate with Harper. The year ends with the team by Harper’s side as her time at Shortland Street flashes before her eyes and dies at the age of 40.

== 2025 ==
This season marked a change in production format with show airing only three nights a week and the year broken up into 4 “mini-series”, with the last titled “Contagion”. The final cliffhanger episode aired as a double episode on Monday 15th December.

As Selina’s condition continued to deteriorate, Hendrix and Logan retrieved a potential cure for the virus. Having realising that Hendrix killed Cleo, Logan and Hendrix fought resulting in their helicopter crashing into the CEO Office and triggered an evacuation of the hospital. As fire spread, Dawn attempted one last time to get Logan out of the helicopter. Chris tried to reason with Poppy to stop her murdering Hendrix as revenge for Cleo. The ED Team stabilised Mana and commenced evacuating him from the building. Outside, Monique confessed to Naz that her baby’s father is actually Marty; Esther felt a sharp pain from the baby she too is having with Marty; and Drew kissed Phil, confessed their feelings for each other - that he in turn rejects. Drew and Phil turned to see the upper floor of the hospital explode, leaving the fate of Dawn, Logan, Poppy, Hendrix, and the ED Team unknown.

The series ended with a flash forward to Chris calling out to Rachel McKenna as she walks the halls of the hospital. The original 90s closing theme plays as the title for the next story arc is revealed, “Legacy”. The show is expected to return on 16 February.

== 2026 ==
This season continued the reduced production format with show airing still only three nights a week and the year broken up into 4 “mini-series”, with the last titled “Reunion”. The cliffhanger aired as a triple episode on Tuesday 17th November.

Rachel and Hone delivered Miriama to her wedding ceremony to Chris in front of an eclectic crowd of current and former Shortland Street characters. Meanwhile, many of the hospital staff were in jeopardy - Maeve, Sophia, Phil, Paul, and Selina were being held in the Emergency Department by serial bomber Brian; Emmett and Sage confronted Cody, who was in an altered state and tried to flee the secure mental health unit with a knife; and Mickey held Poppy and Cindy at gunpoint in their apartment with orders from her father to tie up lose ends.

During the wedding reception, Guy informed Chris that Joy was not going to be able to take custody of Trinity leaving Chris and Miriama to take full custody, and Marty discovered that Nazar and Esther had started a relationship. Meanwhile at the hospital Selina attempted to get Brian to surrender by revealing she’s pregnant, Sophia uses the distraction to break Brian’s neck - much to Maeve’s horror; and outside the psych unit, Emmett instructed Sage on how to save Cody from his self-inflected knife wounds. At the apartment, Poppy set Mickey on fire and was able to get Cindy out the bedroom’s fire escape, however was dragged back into the burning apartment by Mickey before she could escape herself. Later whilst Cindy received treatment from the paramedics, Poppy was brought out in an open body bag.

The season closed with a message being delivered to a prison cell containing Kylie Brown and Nicole Miller. Much to their surprise, Kylie’s request has been “approved” and will be going back to Shortland Street.

Shortland Street will return in February 2027 with the first arc titled “Redemption”.
