= Hunter McKay =

Fictional character

- Shortland Street character
- Portrayed by: Lee Donoghue
- Duration: 2006–12
- First appearance: 8 December 2006
- Last appearance: 6 March 2012
- Introduced by: Jason Daniel
In-universe information
- Occupation: Model (2007–2009); Barman (2008–2009); Paramedic (2008–2011); Student (2009–2011)
- Father: Callum McKay
- Mother: Justine Jones
- Sisters: Sophie McKay
- Grandmothers: Mona McKay
- Uncles: Gordon McKay

Hunter McKay is a fictional character on the New Zealand soap opera Shortland Street who was portrayed by Lee Donoghue from December 2006, as part of a new family unit consisting of parents Callum McKay (Peter Mochrie) and Justine Jones (Laurie Foell), and younger sister Sophie McKay (Kimberley Crossman). Donoghue stayed with the role until he quit in late 2011. Hunter made his final appearance in March 2012.

Hunter was portrayed as an intelligent character who was seen as a womaniser, starting an affair with his bully's mother Tess (Anita Torrance) in 2007. Storylines around Hunter often saw his relationship with his family strained due to his large ego and career choices throughout adolescence; this included the decision to become a model despite his parents' best wishes. The character starred in numerous ethical storylines, including the dangers of modelling, an HIV storyline, and drug addiction. However, the character was also often involved in relationship storylines, including long running partnerships with Tess, Morgan Braithwaite (Bonnie Soper), Jill Kingsbury (Natalie Medlock) and serial killer Penny Rourke (Carolyn Dando).

Donoghue has been praised throughout the characters run, being labelled a "hunk" and a "hottie". His acting has also been praised by television critics, stating he is believable and enjoyable. Hunter's storylines have also been well received, primarily the bullying storyline that resulted in Scarlett Valentine attempting to murder him and his drug addiction.

== Creation and casting ==
The character of Justine Jones had been introduced to the show in 2005 as a vehicle for Australian actress Laurie Foell to enter the soap, having previously made her name on Home and Away. The following year, Foell was offered a reprisal of the role with the intention of centring a new family unit around Justine. To accompany the return of Justine, the characters of her husband Callum, daughter Sophie, and son Hunter, were created. Hunter was said to be "a young man with huge potential." and would be "strong-willed, egotistical and driven as his parents". Lee Donoghue was part way through gaining his qualifications from Toi Whakaari: New Zealand Drama School, when he was offered the role of Hunter McKay. Hunter and Sophie made their first appearance on 8 December 2006 with Hunter's first line being: "Very rustic, can't I get a hug from my mum first?". Donoghue took a 9-week break in mid-2011 to study in New York. Whilst there, Donoghue fell in love and got a management contract. Seeing as his Shortland Street contract was nearing its end, he decided not to renew it. Hunter was written off in the conclusion to his drug addiction storyline, with Donoghue filming his final scenes in December 2011. Hunter made his final appearance in early March 2012 with his final line being; "I love you too."

== Storylines ==
Hunter arrived in New Zealand with sister, Sophie (Kimberley Crossman), in December 2006 and instantly got in trouble with airport security, much to parents Callum (Peter Mochrie) and Justine's (Laurie Foell) anger. He had a brief fling with Scarlett Valentine (Nicole Thomson) but started to bully her, resulting in Scarlett attempting to murder Hunter. Hunter began to get bullied by gay schoolboy – Nate (Damien Harrison), who had a crush on him. He started a controversial relationship with Nate's mother Tess (Anita Torrance) which ended when he proposed. In 2008, Hunter used the fake death of Justine (Lucy Wigmore) to guilt Morgan Braithwaite (Bonnie Soper) into a relationship. His attempts at a career in modelling abruptly ended in 2009 when he realised the huge drug culture in the industry, and he briefly dated nurse Aroha Reed (Geneva Alexander-Marsters) before joining medical school to become a doctor.

In 2010, Hunter briefly dated Tracey Morrison (Sarah Thompson) before getting stabbed with a needle by a drug addict. Faced with possible HIV, Hunter was outcast by his colleagues and when he was stabbed by a thug in May, he finally discovered he did not have the disease. He started to date Penny Rourke (Carolyn Dando) but learnt she was a murderer and turned her in to the police. In 2011, Hunter started to date Jill Kingsbury (Natalie Medlock), but stress and competition with rival Paige (Rachel Foreman) caused Hunter to take ADHD medication. He found himself increasingly reliant and started taking harder drugs when Jill left him for Callum. Hunter was eventually dropped from medical school and Jill ended up dead when Hunter robbed a pharmacy for drugs. Struggling to cope with sobriety, his awaiting trial, and disappointment from Callum, Hunter departed to Hastings to attend rehab in March 2012, finally on good terms with his father.

== Character development ==
=== Drug addiction ===
In 2010, producers decided to exhibit Hunter through a drug addiction storyline to highlight the far stretch and extent of drug addiction. In April 2011 it was announced Rachel Foreman would arrive as new character, Paige Munroe. Paige and Hunter were set to be rivals and compete for top of the medical class. Struggling to cope with medical school study, Hunter starts to take caffeine pills and after seeing Paige taking ADHD medication, borrows some off her to help study. Donoghue purposefully tired himself out to make his acting realistic. The doctor who supplies Hunter is arrested Hunter struggles to stop taking the drugs and when he sees his father Callum has started an affair with his girlfriend Jill, he gets in a car crash and gets seriously injured. The car crash saw the climax of the 2011 feature-length episode. The long episode allowed producers to carry out such a stunt. Injured and upset, Hunter starts to take speed. Donoghue was interested at the storyline, stating it was the most difficult he had encountered in his 5 years on the show but knew it was important, saying; "I think it's quite an important storyline because I've been told that this type of addiction really happens. As Hunter becomes more reliant on the stuff, it starts affecting his relationship with his father, his girlfriend and everyone around him. If he tells anyone about it he's going to get kicked out of med school. He's very much alone and bearing the weight of this all by himself." Evan discovers Hunter's secret and blackmails him, later telling Daniel who forces Hunter to get help. Hunter flees to Dunedin to try to get help. Hunter lies to both Daniel and Callum about his trip to Dunedin, something which Donoghue insisted was easy for him; "With al that's happened, Hunter can't bear losing face to Callum. He has become good at lying about his addiction so is quick to come up with another plan." However 3 months later, Hunter returns heavily addicted to Crystal Meth. Donoghue found Hunter's P addiction "very challenging but incredibly rewarding." He used personal grievances to portray the anguish Hunter suffered.

Producer Steven Zanoski thought the storyline was contemporary, stating; "We have shown that drugs know no socio economic boundaries and even an educated medical student from a wealthy background can fall victim. The storyline has shown that drugs destroy lives and this year's cliff-hanger showcases this, all while providing us with some of the best performances of 2011." Director – Katherine McRae, enjoyed the development of Hunter's drug addiction, stating; "It was such a change from his original character, but over the months the writers have built a credible and involving story and I have thoroughly enjoyed working with Lee on this journey." The 2011 season concluded with Hunter and drug addict friend, Bailey, robbing a pharmacy. Daniel and Jill track Hunter down, only for Daniel to get bludgeoned with a crowbar by Bailey and Jill getting stabbed by a security guard. The season's final scene portrayed Hunter cradling Jill as Daniel lies in a pool of blood. Writers of the show described the scene as a parallel of the last scene of Hamlet. The cliffhanger forces Hunter to accept the consequences with Donoghue explaining; "Hunter's addiction to 'P' has caused him to reach a new low, and with his actions leaving his friends' lives in the balance, Hunter has to now deal with the consequences of the situation, no matter how serious they are." Hunter got arrested and ended up getting bailed to his father's apartment. Although clean from drugs, Hunter struggled with his father's presence and in March 2012 left for a Hastings rehab for a fresh start. Donoghue thoroughly enjoyed playing the storyline and the confidence it brought, stating; "I threw myself into work there those last few months. Usually you ease off the longer you're there, but with the addiction storyline I took things to another level. It was good to show that a serious drug problem can happen to anyone. Hunter had everything he ever wanted and was on his way to becoming a doctor but it only takes one wrong move and it can ruin your life."

== Reception ==
The character has been described as a "hunk" and a "resident hottie", resulting in Donoghue receiving a lot of female attention. Donoghue joked about the " breathless girls" and stated that an abusive elder women hit him on the head for his relationship with Tess. Hunter was the first character from Shortland Street, to become a trending topic on Twitter.

Hunter's early storylines were highly praised by fans, with his attempted murder at the hands of Scarlett Valentine winning "Favourite Moment" in the Throng Shortland Street Fan Awards 2007. In the same awards, Hunter also won "Funniest Moment" for hiding in the nude. His relationship with Tess was criticised, winning runner up in dodgiest moment and his kiss with Nate, runner up for "Strangest Moment". Hunter's drug addiction and subsequent personality change had a hugely differing reception in the 2011 fan awards, with the storyline winning runner up for "Favourite major storyline", while also winning "Most Boring Storyline". Hunter also took out "Character you'd most like to get rid of". In 2012, the character was named as one of the standout characters of the show's first 20 years.

Hugh Sundae of the New Zealand Herald was initially hesitant of Donoghue's acting, but thought that in 2010 the acting of Hunter had significantly improved to an enjoyable state. He again praised Donoghue's acting in the 2011 90-minute episode stating; "Lee Donoghue continues to nail acting under the influence of booze and drugs as Hunter McKay, the likeable prescription-drug addict who's about to get so mad he will actually kick a tyre".
