= Luke Durville =

- Shortland Street character
- Portrayed by: Gerald Urquhart
- Duration: 2007–2013
- First appearance: 14 September 2007
- Last appearance: 31 January 2013
- Introduced by: Jason Daniel (2007–2008); Steven Zanoski (2009–2011)
In-universe information
- Occupation: Anaesthetist
- Brothers: Rafe Durville
- Wife: Bella Durville (2012–2013)
- Sons: Luca Dobra

Dr. Luke Louis Demonte Durville is a fictional character on the New Zealand soap opera Shortland Street who was played by Gerald Urquhart from the character's first appearance in September 2007 until January 2013. The character appeared on a sporadic status until 2012 when he became a core cast member.

Used primarily for comedic relief, Luke was a highly sought after and respected anaesthetist who was portrayed as having a quiet manner and awkward demeanour, but was always a bit of an enigma to his workmates. Despite being highly respected and sought after in his field, he chose not to socialise with his colleagues, preferring to spend his time alone and pursuing his interest in amateur taxidermy and the history of witchcraft and necromancy. The character has been involved in several high profile storylines, including being a suspect in both the Ferndale Strangler storyline and the murder of Ethan Pierce (Owen Black), as well as a romance with popular character Bella Cooper (Ameila Reid).

Luke Durville received a hugely popular reception with the character being highly praised as well as Urquhart's performance. His pairing with Bella Cooper has also been well received and singled out by reviewers of the soap.

== Creation and casting ==
The character of Luke was created as a suspect in the Ferndale Strangler storyline that saw 5 characters killed off by a serial killer as part of a cast cull. Gerald Urquhart had auditioned numerous time for Shortland Street but it was not until he worked alongside casting agent Andrea Kelland in a stage production, that Urquhart was asked if he would like a role on the soap. During the production he had played a character named "Dex" and was subsequently cast as a character very similar on the show: Luke Durville. Urquhart was originally cast for 5 weeks. It was announced in August 2007 that Gerald Urquhart would be arriving as kooky new anaesthetist Luke Durville as part of the Ferndale Strangler storyline. Urquhart's first day filming was on location and he spent a majority of it as a background character, reflecting back he found it a, "relaxing introduction" and enjoyed, "having such an easy start." He made his first appearance on 14 September 2007. The producers enjoyed the character and continued to write for him, with Urquhart's contract continuously extended. He appeared for 3 months, making his last appearance on 13 December 2007. Urquhart returned to the role in October 2008 and continued in the role until May 2009. Urquhart reprised the role for several episodes in March 2010.

It was announced in August 2010 that Luke would once again be returning with more central storylines such as the arrival of his brother. Urquhart enjoyed the sporadic nature of his appearances, "One of the things I enjoy most about working at Shorty is the great big family that is the cast and crew. Each time I come back there are new additions and others have left. We all work hard as a team, fulfilling each of our roles, and we still manage to find time to have a laugh or two." Durville continued in the role through to April 2011. It was announced in August that Durville would be returning to the show and would be getting a love interest. His return saw Urquhart finally promoted to the main cast after 4 years of being credited as recurring guest. In August 2012 Urquhart was contacted by his agent to inform him he had been axed. After further meetings with producers, he was informed Luke was to die from a brain tumour in scenes set to be aired early in the new year. He filmed his final scenes in December and struggled to hold the secret over the Christmas break. Upon his final scene airing, Urquhart felt "relieved" and was "ready to move onto bigger and better things". Luke was killed off on the episode airing 30 January 2013.

== Storylines ==
Under his locum anaesthetist occupation, Luke found himself temporary employed at Shortland Street Hospital and was infuriated that Sophie McKay (Kimberley Crossman) and Nate Adamson (Damien Harrison) had named him as the Ferndale Strangler online. His odd behaviour soon aroused the suspicion of others, mainly Brenda (Katherine McRae) who was mysteriously murdered. Luke returned when he opposed Ethan Pierce's (Owen Black) bid for head of surgery and got a full-time job at the hospital. He and Ethan continued to clash and Luke was under investigation when Ethan was shot to death. Luke performed hypnosis on Alice Piper (Toni Potter), allowing her to realise Maia Jeffries (Anna Jullienne) was the killer. Luke returned again and showed attraction to new surgeon, Gabrielle Jacobs (Virginie Le Brun). Gabrielle brutally rejected Luke and he considered resigning. Luke returned and instantly started a feud with Isaac Worthington (Matt Minto) over the treatment of his crush on Tania Jeffries (Faye Smythe). He returned once again and his feud with Isaac was finally put to rest. Luke attempted to admit his love to Tania, but lost her to brother Rafe (Simon London).

Luke and Isaac's feud returned when Luke discovered Isaac had performed illegal surgery, only for Luke to get kidnapped by a dangerous Russian gang. Having survived, Luke was framed for drug addiction by Isaac to hide the evidence. Ashamed and loathed, Luke eventually cleared his name and returned to the hospital, before he ventured overseas. When Luke returned and rejected the advances of Vasa Levi (Teuila Blakely) when he announced his engagement to Romanian, Zlata (Kate Elliott). However it was soon apparent Zlata wanted to drastically change Luke and his best friend Bella Cooper (Amelia Reid) realised she was in love with him. The crush soon became mutual and Luke left Zlata for a romance with Bella. The following year the two became engaged but on the night before the wedding, Luke was diagnosed with Glioblastoma multiforme, an aggressive brain tumour. Nonetheless, Luke and Bella married. The couple struggled with Luke's condition but his life was celebrated with two early wakes attended by friends and colleagues. A short while later, Luke collapsed in the cafeteria and died from a brain bleed, with Bella by his side.

Soon after his death Zlata returned to Ferndale with the news she had become a mother to Luke's illegitimate son, Luca Dobra (Charlie Truman). Bella began to question her engagement to Dallas Adams (Cameron Jones) after Luke's cat Kronos (Fred) miraculously showed up at the Cooper house, making her think his spirit was opposed to the marriage.

== Character development ==
"Luke's a great character. He's lots of fun to play because he has a lot of character traits that your average New Zealander doesn't, which leads to a few people thinking he's a bit suspicious. A couple of his habits are a bit dodgy, but he's not that bad."

— Gerald Urquhart on Durville's strange personality.

=== Characterisation ===
Gerald Urquhart enjoyed Luke's characterisation, saying, "Luke is misunderstood. His strange demeanour and interests are his defining features. However, underneath his mumbling exterior lurks a kind, considerate individual. He is traditional, loyal and professional, longing for companionship and thirsty for knowledge." Luke is "calm" and "even tempered" and found being a suspect in the Ferndale stranglings and the murder of Ethan Pierce as insulting. Urquhart believed that earlier incarnations of Luke, had him portrayed as a much darker and "stranger" character, whilst the Luke seen in 2012 was a lot more personable and extracted a larger audience reaction. He said the transformation happened over night; one day he was being called "weird" and "strange", and the next, he was getting called "loyal" and "honorable". Luke has been labelled "kooky", an "oddball", "elusive" and "misunderstood". In 2011, Luke's fiance Zlata Waldheim (Kate Elliott) encouraged him to be more "normal" and as a result Luke started to wear an Italian suit and a toupee. After dumping Zlata, Luke kept some elements of his wardrobe but mixed them with his old suits, creating awkward final products. Urquhart enjoyed how "different" Luke was from himself and loved his, "integrity, his honesty and his old fashioned sensibilities" alongside his, "approach to love." When comparing himself to Luke, Urquhart believed they both had a "very similar authoritative tone" and he in fact studied the occult and witchcraft as a teenager. Urquhart put on a voice to portray Luke and though he only expected the role to last 5 weeks, he eventually enjoyed adapting his vocals for his whole 5 1/2-year tenure and compared it to "putting on old clothes".

=== Relationship with Bella Cooper ===
Throughout the characters early years, Luke landed very few romance storylines despite the wishes of Urquhart who stated upon his return in 2010, "I would really like to see Luke in love. We have seen him pining for various women with no success, so I feel it is about time for him to have a romance. Whether she is the right woman for Luke is unimportant. But I would enjoy playing a love-struck Durville being lead [sic] astray." In 2011 Luke returned to the show with a fiance, Zlata Waldheim. Urquhart enjoyed the way Luke followed Zlata around and stated; "It's lot of fun to play the kind of romance. Luke has suffered from unrequited love for a long time, so it's great to have some love being given back to him." However the staff soon realised that Zlata was manipulating Luke to drastically change him as a person, none more so than Luke's best friend, Bella Cooper (Amelia Reid). Urquhart stated that Luke did not mind about his poor treatment as long as he was pleasing Zlata and that Luke would do anything for love. Bella soon realised she was in love with Luke and was disorientated when Zlata placed her at the centre of the wedding organization. Phil Peloton (Costel Waldheim) believed that Luke could have tried harder with Zlata, stating, "Luke is no Romanian man and that's a good thing in some ways, but I think he needs to lift his game and man up a bit if he wants to keep Zlata". Luke soon realised he too was in love with Bella and put an end to his and Zlata's engagement. In 2012 through the manipulation of Brooke Freeman (Beth Allen), the two separated, but quickly reconciled. Several months later, the couple got engaged and Bella soon became a "bridezilla".

Bella ended up winning a competition that would see their wedding paid for, Reid explained, "She was very excited about it. Luke, not so much – the idea of having to have photographs and making it so public. He's definitely pleasing her and going along with this big dream fairytale wedding. He'd much prefer, I think, to just have family and a quiet ceremony but she's planning this wedding since she was about 5 years old so she's going a bit crazy." Urquhart agreed, stating that Luke's perfect wedding, "would have some kind of ritual from somewhere but the main focus for Luke would be that him and his bride were there and he'd be happy .... he deals with her as he always has – with love and servitude." On the night prior to the wedding, Luke was diagnosed with Glioblastoma multiforme and emotionally admitted to Bella she should reconsider marrying a dying man. Nonetheless, Bella decided to carry on with the nuptials and the two married in December 2012. The wedding march used for the episode was the same as the music used for the 1981 wedding between Charles, Prince of Wales and Diana, Princess of Wales. Although happily married, Bella struggled to accept Luke's diagnosis and suggested she have his child to keep his legacy alive. Luke was hesitant to accept the offer and instead, the couple threw a "living wake", a party themed around that of a wake set to celebrate Luke's life. Reid elaborated on Bella's desire to have the party, "Bella thinks this is a perfect opportunity for people to show their appreciation of Luke and his life. But she wants to keep it as cheerful as possible." As such she struggled with the theme of death. Several months after Luke's death, Zala returned to Ferndale with a baby, Luke's apparent son, Luca Dobra (Charlie Truman). Bella embraced Luca, with Reid explaining, "she realises that Luca is definitely Luke’s baby, it really hits her hard. But it doesn’t take her long to realise that having Luca around is like having a little piece of Luke in her life and she embraces being part of his upbringing."

== Reception ==
Luke Durville has proved to be one of the most popular recurring characters on the show since its inception with Gerald Urquhart's performance being a favourite of fans and critics alike. In the Ferndale Talk Best of 2013 awards, Luke's death was voted "Most Shocking Plot Twist" and his relationship with Bella was voted third place for "Favourite Couple".

Urquhart's co star, Matt Minto (Isaac Worthington) spoke of the fan's praise for Luke, "Luke's popular because he's eccentric; taxidermy is his life after all. He is intrinsically funny. He is also very good-natured and always means well, which I'm sure appeals to the audience." He also believed he was going to become "public enemy number one" following the storyline of Isaac getting Luke kidnapped. Urquhart further elaborated on the characters popularity and 'cult following', saying: "I think he's someone who's a little out of the box, but I also think he's got a heart of gold and people connect with his earnestness". The storyline that saw Luke romance Zlata (Kate Elliott) was labelled as "shocking", due to the speed to which the characters fell in love. In 2012 Luke was named as one of the standout characters of the show's first 20 years. The soaps longest running actor, Michael Galvin (Chris Warner), named Luke as his favourite character.

Throughout his first stint, Urquhart's favourite scene was where Luke threatened to take Sophie McKay to court over accusing him of being a serial killer. He enjoyed the vast variety of emotion it enabled him to play as opposed to Luke's normal behaved manner. As one of the primary suspects in the Ferndale Strangler storyline, Luke sparked a large reaction with the public and during the airing, Urquhart often found himself abused or confronted by viewers believing him to be involved in the deaths of several loved characters. The relationship between Luke and Isaac that fluxillated between friendship and deep rivalry, adorned the title, "Isaac versus Luke" and was named by Television New Zealand as one of the highlights of the 2011 Shortland Street season. The love triangle between Luke, Bella and Zlata was also listed as one of the top moments. Luke's death was named as the top moment of the 2013 season by Television New Zealand.
