= Xtreme Waste =

Xtreme Zero Waste is a non-profit organisation dedicated to recycling and based in the town of Raglan, New Zealand. In 2014 it was rebranded from Xtreme Waste. According to its mission statement, its goal is to create a waste management system for the Raglan/Whaingaroa community in which none of the trash would be stored in landfills.

Xtreme Waste operates a recycling center in Raglan. This center is open to the public on Monday, Wednesday, Friday and Sunday from 8:30 AM to 4:30 PM, and on Saturday from 12:30–4:30 PM. Group tours are available on Tuesdays and Thursdays and are free for groups in the Waikato District area, with fees for other groups available upon inquiry. Xtreme Waste provides miniskips, truck delivery services, waste and recycling services and consultancies, and educational programmes.

Actor and Raglan resident Antonio Te Maioha has publicly spoken about Xtreme Waste's accomplishments and his own involvement in Raglan's recycling programme.

== History ==
The organisation was founded in 2000, after Raglan's landfill closed and the town decided to find an alternative to transporting all its waste to a tip in the Waikato. Since 2000, it has recycled an increasing volume and percentage of waste every year. As of 2010, Xtreme Waste prevents over 70% of the community's waste from reaching the landfill and employs 24 workers part-time.

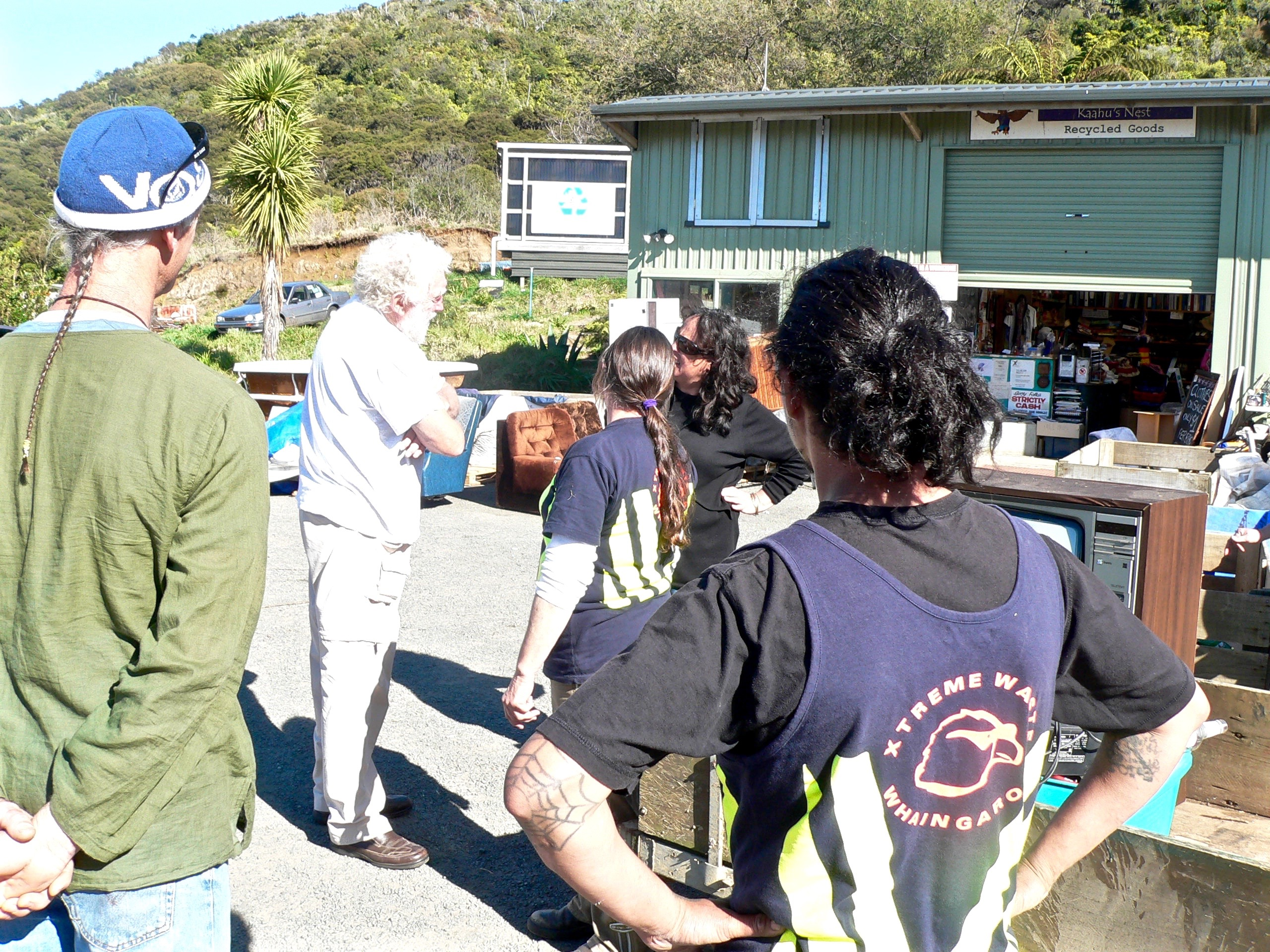
Xtreme Waste staff talk to David Bellamy in 2009 outside the Kaahu's Nest recycling shop.

The organisation has won numerous awards, including a 2002 Waikato Business and Environment Award, a 2005 Waikatari City Council "Change Catalyst" Award, a 2005 New Zealand Ministry for the Environment's "Green Ribbon" Award and a 2006 Sustainable Business Network "Social Responsibility" Award. In 2010, Xtreme Waste was one of three New Zealand recycling projects to be funded by the New Zealand Government's Waste Minimisation Fund, receiving a $21,740 grant. Most of the grant money will be used for a study determining the feasibility of converting organic waste, particularly food waste, to compost. The study is projected to be complete by June 2011, after which Xtreme Waste will decide whether it will go ahead with a trial. The grant was announced in November 2010 by Nick Smith, New Zealand's Minister for the Environment and the trial started in 2012 with 100 houses in Raglan West. In 2015 the food waste collection was included in a new 5-year contract, with a provision to move the funding to a targeted rate.

As part of its education programme, Xtreme has run a recycled raft race since 2004.
