= The Last Magic Show =

Last Magic Show
- Directed by: Andy Conlan
- Written by: Andy Conlan
- Produced by: Alex Lee, Andy Conlan
- Starring: Andy Conlan
- Cinematography: Duncan Cole
- Edited by: Ahab Blin
- Music by: Don McGlashan
- Release date: 11 July 2007
- Running time: 90 min
- Country: New Zealand
- Language: English
- Budget: $50,000

The Last Magic Show is a 2007 New Zealand film starring and written and directed by Andy Conlan. It debuted at Dances With Films festival in July 2007 where it received an honorable mention. Cinematographer Duncan Cole won Best Technical Contribution to a Digital Feature 2007 Air New Zealand Screen Awards.

The film was shot in Auckland in April and May 2005 with a budget of $50,000 with cast and crew working on a points system.

== Cast ==
- Andy Conlan as Ronny Roman
- Georgie Hill as Sarah March
- Jade Collins as Celestine Richards
- Michael Hurst as Trevor Norton
- Alexander Anderson as Henry Peters
- Matthew Sunderland as Lemuel
- Lucy Wigmore as Margot

== Reception ==
James Croot of the Press gave it 3 stars and says it is "an uneven, but quirky and engaging, romance." He adds "Not exactly magic, but by no means the worst show in town." In Film Threat Georgia Menides wrote "Well acted, darkly lit, and gorgeously shot, the dark undertones of this story seem to ooze off the screen. " She finishes "you will be reminded of exactly why you love independent cinema."
