= Daniel Potts =

Daniel Potts may refer to:

- Daniel Potts (Shortland Street), fictional character in the soap opera Shortland Street
- Dan Potts (footballer) (born 1994), English footballer
- Danny Potts, child actor in the film Greystoke: The Legend of Tarzan, Lord of the Apes
- Daniel T. Potts, American historian
