= Laurie Foell =

Australian actress

- Born: Laurence Foel; 10 February 1968 (age 58); Argentina
- Occupation: Actress
- Years active: 1986–present

Laurie Foell (born Laurence Foel on 10 February 1968) is an Australian actress. She is best known for her portrayal of both Angela "Angie" Russell and her cousin Josie, in the successful Australian television soap opera Home and Away. Foell also starred as Dr. Justine Jones in the long running New Zealand hospital soap Shortland Street.

== Career ==
=== Home and Away ===
Foell first appeared in Home and Away in 1999 in a small role playing Kelly McCane. She returned to the show as the conniving and psychotic super-bitch Angie Russell in September 2002, when the show's ratings were slipping. Her character quickly became one of Australia's favourite villainesses with many fans referring to her six months on the show (ending in April 2003) as the "Angie Era". The storylines revolving around her – ultimately ending in her murder, and subsequent investigation – are credited with giving the show a resurgence in popularity.

Half a year later, viewers were shocked with the revelation in the 2003 season finale that new girl Tasha (played by Isabel Lucas) was Angie's daughter – a move which led to Foell returning to the show briefly as Angie in 2004 as visions haunting Tasha. Foell returned to the show in August 2004 in a new role as Angie's cousin Josie Russell, whom she played until June 2005.

=== Shortland Street ===
In 2005 she appeared in a six-week recurring guest role on Shortland Street as Justine Jones, an ambitious career driven doctor hired to assist Dr. Chris Warner (played by Michael Galvin) with the Plastics Unit. Justine used her position to undermine Chris and eventually stole the contract away from him and took it to Australia. In July 2006, Laurie Foell reprised her Shortland Street role full-time, with Justine being controversially given a senior surgeon role at the hospital.

It was announced on 22 November 2006 that Shortland Street would replace Foell in the role of Justine Jones with actress Lucy Wigmore. South Pacific Pictures, which makes the show, said Foell's departure was a "mutual decision". There was some speculation into the details of this due to anonymous postings on a fan website, which suggested the departure was less than mutual. Shortland Street producer Jason Daniel said Justine Jones was a popular character, central to both current and upcoming storylines, hence the decision to recast the role, a first for the kiwi soap opera.

=== Other work ===
Foell's other acting credits include a starring role in the New Zealand soap opera City Life in 1996 and several small parts in various films.

== Filmography ==
=== Film ===
Year	Title	Role	Notes
1986	The Fringe Dwellers	Waitress	Feature film
2001	Russian Doll	Eve Davenport	Feature film
2001	Elixir	Julia Woodland	Feature film
2015	Women He's Undressed	Nurse	Documentary feature film

=== Television ===
Year	Title	Role	Notes
1995	Blue Murder	Pam Drury	Miniseries (2 episodes)
1996	G.P.	Jane Severen	"Brain Storm" (S8E5)
1996–98	City Life	Stephanie Cox	Season 1 (regular, 26 episodes)
1997	Big Sky	Pauline Davies	"Mac's Time" (S1E19)
1997	Heartbreak High	Amanda	(S6E39)
1998	Chameleon	Nana	TV movie
1998	Tiger Country	Det. Sgt. Stephanie Wilson	TV movie
1999	Home and Away	Kelly McCane	Season 12 (guest, 2 episodes)
2000	Nowhere to Land	Flight Attendant Maggie	TV movie
2002	All Saints	Stacey Fowler	"Thicker Than Water" (S5E13)
2002	The Vector File	Helen	TV movie
2002–04	Home and Away	Angie Russell	Seasons 15–16 (recurring), Season 17 (guest)
2002	Don't Blame the Koalas	Miss Crowley	"Greg Scores a Goal" (S1E4)
2004–05	Home and Away	Josie Russell	Seasons 17–18 (regular)
2005–06	Shortland Street	Justine Jones	Season 14 (guest), Season 15 (regular)
2007	Reckless Behavior: Caught on Tape	Esther Richardson	TV movie
2010	Cops LAC	Gillian Lothar	"Ladies' Night" (S1E12)
