= Craig Valentine =

- Shortland Street character
- Portrayed by: Renato Bartolomei
- Duration: 2004–2008
- First appearance: 24 May 2004
- Last appearance: 2 September 2008
- Introduced by: Harriet Crampton
In-universe information
- Occupation: Head of ED at Shortland Street (2004–08)
- Brothers: Brett Valentine
- Wife: Paula Valentine (until 1994)
- Sons: Jake Valentine
- Daughters: Scarlett Valentine; Kelly Piper

Dr. Craig Valentine is a fictional character on the New Zealand soap opera Shortland Street. He was portrayed by Renato Bartolomei for four years from May 2004 to September 2008.

The character arrived in mid-2004 as the father of the established character Scarlett (Nicole Thomson), in what was to become a new family unit for the soap. The character embarked in a steamy on/off relationship with the hugely popular Sarah Potts (Amanda Billing) in a romance storyline that lasted four years. The character's final storyline saw Craig investigate dodgy pills from a pharmaceutical company, Scott Spear, which resulted in his murder by hired thugs. His relationships often stemmed from his kind but overly protective personality, with a hugely cemented friendship with Chris Warner (Michael Galvin) and a long running relationship with the feisty Alice Piper (Toni Potter).

== Creation and casting ==
After filming ended on the series Mercy Peak, Bartolomei decided he would stay in New Zealand rather than returning to Australia and was offered the role of a new character – Craig Valentine on Shortland Street, who was set to undergo a steamy romance with the upcoming character Sarah Potts. Bartolomei decided to leave the soap in 2008, saying, "It was a very difficult decision, from an actor's point of view it's not very often that you have the security that a job like Shortland Street provides. But after four and a half years I longed for a degree of anonymity again. I'm a very private person, and given what I do for a job, the spectre of Shortland Street will invariably take that away from you." The character was killed off in a dramatic gang storyline, something which producers at first thought would be "unforgivable" but which, due to Bartolomei's insistence on leaving, they went through with. Bartolomei said of the storyline, "It's all a bit of fun and it's nice to see the characters away from the normal hospital setting and involved in something a little bit different," and of the conclusion to Sarah and Craig's romance, "That does get revisited but not in a stereotypical way. There is a great deal of resolution at the end for everyone concerned."

== Storylines ==
Craig arrived at the hospital when his best friend, Chris Warner (Michael Galvin), hired him to be run the Emergency Department. Craig at first clashed with Sarah Potts (Amanda Billing) before the two briefly dated. The arrival of Craig's ex-wife, Paula (Vivian Bell) and his brother Brett (Colin Moy), for whom she had left Craig, caused trouble when Brett died and Paula tried to reignite the marriage. Craig kicked Paula out and in 2005 started to date Huia (Nicola Kawana). However, he unsuccessfully tried to persuade Sarah to return to him over fiancé Andrew (Paolo Rotondo). Craig's anger problems began to destroy his relationship with Huia and when she stood him down for an outburst, he broke it off and returned to Sarah. However, while at a conference, Craig had a one-night stand with, and impregnated, Huia. Sarah broke it off with him and Huia and their child died in an explosion. Craig confessed his love for Sarah only to lose out on her to Huia's cousin TK (Benjamin Mitchell).

In 2007, Craig started to date Alice Piper (Toni Potter) and tried to stop Sarah marrying TK, but ended up escorting Sarah to the ceremony himself. Craig suffered a huge heart attack at the wedding party and was infuriated by Alice treating him like a patient. In 2008, Craig was devastated when he nearly lost Alice to The Ferndale Strangler and helped her through her post-traumatic stress before he proposed. Alice became pregnant but Craig broke it off when he realised she had cheated on him. He was devastated to learn how badly bullied his daughter Scarlett (Nicole Thomson) was and left Shortland Street for a position at pharmaceutical company, Scott Spear, where he hoped he could expose their illegal activities. However, shortly after discovering sufficient evidence, Craig was run off the road, beaten and set alight by hired thugs. A memorial service was held days later, where Sarah sang a song highlighting Craig's personality. With Craig's evidence, Scott Spear was shut down in 2009.

== Reception ==
The character was labelled a "heart throb", severely embarrassing Bartolomei. Potter jokingly referred to women expressing their jealousy over her onscreen boyfriend. The actor received a nomination for "Best Actor" for his work throughout 2008 in the New Zealand TV Guide Best on the Boox Awards. In 2012, the character was named as one of the outstanding characters of the show's first 20 years.

Following Craig's gruesome and violent death scene, which saw the character beaten with a baseball bat then set alight, Shortland Street received its second warning from the Broadcasting Standards Authority following several complaints. The warning was given because "The theme was likely to frighten and disturb child viewers, particularly because the violence – which included easily accessible weapons such as baseball bats – was realistic in the sense that it could happen in New Zealand."
