= Antonio Te Maioha =

New Zealand actor

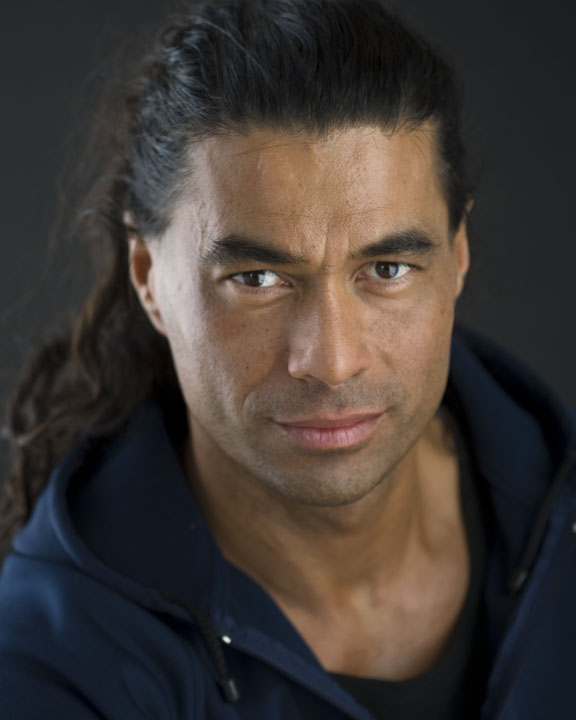
- Born: 1 February 1970 (age 56); Auckland, New Zealand
- Occupation: Actor
- Years active: 1998–present
- Height: 6 ft 4 in (193 cm)

Antonio Te Maioha (born 1 February 1970) is a television and film actor from New Zealand. He came to international prominence playing a gladiator Barca, the Beast of Carthage, in the television drama Spartacus: Blood and Sand and its prequel Spartacus: Gods of the Arena.

== Background ==
Te Maioha was born in Auckland on 1 February 1970, and was raised in Hastings in the Hawke's Bay Region of the North Island of New Zealand. He was educated at Havelock North High School. His father was of Māori descent through both the Ngāpuhi tribe, the largest in New Zealand, and the Waikato tribe, also known as the "Tainui" or "Waikato-Tainui."

== Career ==
Maioha started his career as a street performer before gaining a place at the Toi Whakaari Drama School in 1992. He graduated with a Bachelor of Performing Arts (Acting) in 2005. He went on to work with a Māori theatre project run by actor Jim Moriarty and was in the cast of Waiora, touring New Zealand, Hawaii and Britain.

One of Te Maioha's first significant television roles was in 1998 playing Boraxis in Hercules: The Legendary Journeys followed by guest roles in Xena: Warrior Princess and Legend of the Seeker, a weekly television series based on The Sword of Truth novels by Terry Goodkind." He has also appeared in other New Zealand-based television productions, including Shortland Street and The Lost World. Te Maioha has also had roles in several films, including Te Tangata Whai Rawa O Weneti and a short film called Taua (War Party)" and the 2000 film Feathers of Peace (Ngati Tama Warrior) directed by Barry Barclay.

Te Maioha has come to international attention through his supporting role as the gladiator Barca in the television drama Spartacus: Blood and Sand and its prequel Spartacus: Gods of the Arena. Nicknamed the "Beast of Carthage", Barca is the bodyguard and hitman of a dominus owner named Batiatus. Several episodes into the show, he is shown to be in a homosexual relationship with a slave boy named Pietros. He is eventually murdered when Pietros is tricked into revealing damning evidence about Barca.

In 2016, he was cast in a minor role of a Māori Warrior in Zoolander 2. He also appears in the 2023 film The Convert. He is in one episode of the Apple TV series Chief of War.

== Personal life ==
Te Maioha is married and lives in the town of Raglan on the west coast of New Zealand's North Island.

Active in local environmentalism, he has hosted a Sustainable Futures Forum in Waikato that brought around 80 people to discuss a variety of environmental issues. He has also publicly discussed his personal involvement and Raglan's leadership in recycling, citing the accomplishments of a local organization called Xtreme Waste. Te Maioha is uncomfortable with being labeled as a "greenie," saying that he is just doing "stuff everybody could" and that being given such a label means that other people will "write you off...instead of actually listening to what’s being said or applying changes in their own lives."
