= Nicola Kawana =

New Zealand actress

Nicola Kāwana
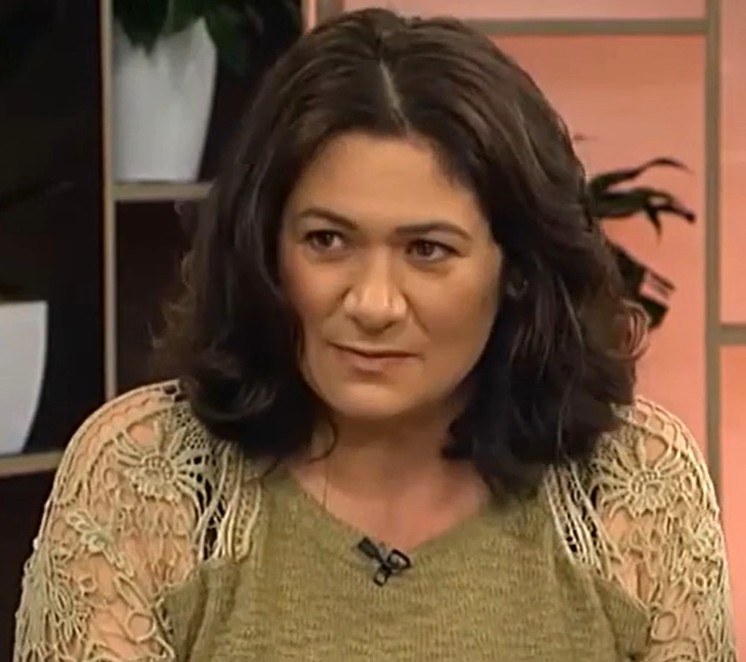
- Kāwana in 2017
- Born: 1970 (age 55–56); New Zealand
- Occupations: Actress and theatre maker
- Years active: 1998–present
- Relatives: Lucy Takiora Lord (great aunt)

Nicola Kāwana (born 1970) is a New Zealand actress, best known for playing Huia Samuels on the longest running New Zealand television series Shortland Street. Other roles include Mercy Peak, Jackson's Wharf, Lollie in The Man Who Lost His Head and “Mad” Maggie in Apex Legends.

== Career ==
Kāwana was born in Taranaki, and was part of Taranaki Youth Theatre. She did actor training at Toi Whakaari: New Zealand Drama School graduating in 1994.

As of 20 August 2006, the character Huia Samuels has been written out of Shortland Street. It was reported that Kāwana was very angry with the decision. However, the story that appeared went to print based on gossip. Kāwana was unable to give her side of the story due to the legal constraints of her contract to South Pacific Pictures, the makers of the serial programme.

July 2021 was the premier of a play Kāwana wrote called Kūpapa. This play is about an ancestor of Kāwana's, Lucy Takiora Lord, who was involved in significant historical events in Aotearoa New Zealand. The play was presented by Te Pou Theatre in Auckland and directed by Erina Daniels.

Kāwana also works as a garden writer, gardener and presenter on the Māori TV show, Whānau Living. Nicola is a member of Equity New Zealand, a UNICEF Global Parent.

== Filmography ==
=== Film ===
| Year | Title | Role | Notes | Ref |
|---|---|---|---|---|
| 1998 | Saving Grace | Nurse | | |
| 2005 | The Mystery of DeRezny's Limp | DeRezny's Mother | Short | |
| 2009 | Kehua | Sarah | Short | |
| 2012 | Fresh Meat | Margaret Crane | | |
| 2013 | Pumanawa: The Gift | Spirit Pare | Short | |
| 2018 | Maui's Hook | | | |

=== Television ===
| Year | Title | Role | Notes | Ref |
|---|---|---|---|---|
| 1998 | The Enid Blyton Secret Series | Jaguarheads | "The Secret Mountain" | |
| 1999 | Jackson's Wharf | Mahina Jackson | Recurring role | |
| 2002 | Mercy Peak | Karina Chadwick | "Do the Right Thing", "Fear and Loathing" | |
| 2002 | Mataku | Tui Burton | "The Rocks" | |
| 2005–06 | Shortland Street | Huia Samuels | Regular role | |
| 2007 | The Man Who Lost His Head | Lollie | TV film | |
| 2008 | Legend of the Seeker | Sylvia | "Brennidon" | |
| 2010 | Eruption | Mere | TV film | |
| 2011 | Brown Bruthaz | | TV series | |
| 2014 | The Kick | | TV film | |
| 2015 | Find Me a Maori Bride | Judge Judy | "1.8" | |
| 2016 | Reset | Mere | TV film | |
| 2016 | The Brokenwood Mysteries | Tina | "Over Her Dead Body", "A Merry Bloody Christmas" | |
| 2017 | Kiwi | Janice | TV film | |
| 2018 | The New Legends of Monkey | Meera | "A Part of You That's Missing" | |
| 2018 | In Dark Places | P.C. Salu | TV film | |
| 2019 | Ahikāroa | Dina | "Season 2" | |
| 2026 | Bust Up | Lesley Kelsey | TV series | |

=== Video games ===
| Year | Title | Role | Notes | Ref |
|---|---|---|---|---|
| 2021–present | Apex Legends | Mad Maggie | | |

== Theatre ==
Kāwana's first professional role was in Hone Tuwhare’s In the Wilderness Without a Hat in 1989 at Taki Rua.

Her theatre acting roles include:

| Year | Title | Playwright | Role | Director | Producer | Notes | Ref |
|---|---|---|---|---|---|---|---|
| 1995 | Five Angels | Hone Kouka | | Alison Quignan | Centrepoint Theatre | | |
| 1996 | Mo & Jess Kill Susie | Gary Henderson | | Gary Henderson | BATS Theatre | | |
| 1998 | Homefires | Hone Kouka | Tia | Nathaniel Lees | Downstage Theatre | in NZ Festival of the Arts programme | |
| 1998 | Kindertransport | Diane Samuels | Mother | Donagh Rees | Herald Theatre | Unreal Theatre Company | |
| 1999 | Les Parents Terribles | Jean Cocteau | Madeline | Cathy Downes | Circa Theatre | | |
| 2001 | Woman Far Walking | Witi Ihimaera | Tilly | Christian Penny | Taki Rua Productions | performed in New Plymouth (July) and at the Herald Theatre, Auckland in August | |
| 2012 | The Motor Camp | Dave Armstrong | Dawn Taoioa | Roy Ward | Auckland Theatre Company | Comedy, based on a story by Danny Mulheron | |
| 2012 | Awatea | Bruce Mason | Pera | Colin McColl | ATC | | |
| 2014 | Fix | Jess Sayer | Grace | Sam Sneddon | The Basement | | |
| 2015 | A Dolls House | Emily Perkins | Christine | Colin McColl | ATC | adapted from Ibsen's original | |
| 2018 | Rendered | Stuart Hoar | Major Aria | Katie Wolfe | ATC | | |
| 2018 | Under the Mountain | Pip Hall | Aunty Noeline | Sara Brodie | ATC | adapted from Maurice Gee novel | |
| 2019 | Astroman | Albert Belz | Mrs Mahara | Tainui Tukiawalo | ATC | in assoc. with Te Rehia Theatre and Auckland Arts Festival. | |
| 2020 | The Master Builder | Hendik Ibsen | Dr Kerdal | Colin McColl | ATC | a hybrid of theatre and film | |
| 2020 | Red Rabbit, White Rabbit | Nassim Soleimanpour | Solo | The Audience | Silo Theatre | Improvisation from playwright's instructions, unseen by the actor | |
| 2021 | Things That Matter | Gary Henderson | Carol | Anapela Polata'ivao | ATC | adapted from a memoir by Dr David Galler | |

== Awards ==
1996 Chapman Tripp Theatre Awards - Most Promising Female Newcomer of the Year - Mo & Jess Kill Susie by Gary Henderson
