= Lee Donoghue =

New Zealand former actor

- Born: Lee Thomas Donoghue; 12 October 1983 (age 42); Wellington, New Zealand
- Occupation: Actor
- Years active: 1991–present
- Political party: New Zealand First

Lee Thomas Donoghue (born 12 October 1983) is a New Zealand actor and right-wing political activist. He is best known for his role as Hunter McKay on New Zealand soap opera Shortland Street. He was a candidate in the 2023 New Zealand general election for the New Zealand First party.

== Early life ==
Born on 12 October 1983, Donoghue grew up in Lower Hutt but he also lived in Perth, Western Australia, for three years when he was younger. He was educated at Catholic boys' school St Bernard's College, Lower Hutt, finishing in 2001, where he was involved in cricket, debating and was a prefect.

== Acting ==
Donoghue's acting career began when a friend of the family suggested his mother take him to a talent agency, which they did and he quickly gained work acting in commercials. His first taste of acting came at eight years old when he won a starring role in a TVNZ advertising campaign. He was then given a small role in television mini-series Fall Out in which he played Byron Lange. After that he went on to take on roles in shows such as The Tribe and the British production Atlantis High. During this time he also took part in Young and Hungry, a youth amateur theatre.

In 2006, when Donoghue was part way his studies at Wellington's Toi Whakaari, he was offered the role of Hunter McKay, the wayward son of Callum McKay and Justine Jones, on New Zealand soap opera Shortland Street. His first scenes aired in December 2006, and he subsequently was involved in several major storylines, such as his and onscreen sister Sophie's torment of Scarlett Valentine to the brink of her trying to run them down with her father's car, and getting involved with a 34-year-old widow who worked with his parents.

== Politics ==
In 2023, Donoghue returned to New Zealand to run as a candidate for the New Zealand First party for the 2023 general election in the Hutt South electorate. On 16 September, he was ranked 12th on the NZ First party list.

On becoming a candidate, Donoghue voiced his views on a range of social issues. He has said he believes the New Zealand education system suffers from a "woke virus" and the "ever-increasing sexualisation of children" in primary schools which are "teaching kids about different sexual preferences, acts, genders at a very young age”, calling for a return to basic sexual education that begins when children reach intermediate or high school. On the issue of transgender rights, Donoghue said that "more kids now are transgendering, or transitioning, than ever before". He has publicly supported New Zealand First's stance on restricting toilet access on the basis of biological sex, saying "We have people basically saying to us 'hey, I was assaulted in a bathroom by a biological male, this is wrong'." Asked about the frequency of such incidents, he said "I don't have them in front of me right now, but it's a true thing. We want to make sure everyone's safe." Donoghue has also stated support for New Zealand First's stance on withholding public funding to sports bodies that do not have exclusive biological female categories, stating that New Zealand Olympian Lorraine Moller told him "biological men participating in female sports, blowing them away, in their changing spaces, and what it's doing is discouraging women from actually participating now."

At the 2023 election, Donoghue came fourth place in Hutt South with 1,228 votes. Following the election, he returned to Los Angeles where he lives.

== Filmography ==
Year	Title	Role
1995	Mirror, Mirror (TV miniseries)	Unnamed
1995	Fallout (film)	Byron Lange
1999–2000	The Tribe (TV series)	Spike
2001	Atlantis High (TV series)	Josh Montana
2002	Revelations – The Initial Journey (TV series)	Mike
2004	Futile Attraction (film)	Mark
2005	King Kong (film)	Unnamed (Uncredited)
2006–2012	Shortland Street (TV series)	Hunter McKay
2008	What Now (TV series)	Himself
2011	Ollie (Short Film)	Adrian
2016	Fall into Me (Webseries)	Trent
2016	American Family (TV Series)	Jeff Walker
2020	Almost Paradise (TV Series)	Max Adler
2022	The Contrast (Film)	Dimple
2023	A Sweet Tooth (Short Film)	Trent

== Personal life ==
In 2007, Donoghue became involved with an online support site for people dealing with depression called The Lowdown. He did so in his capacity as a Shortland Street actor along with other celebrities such as musicians, TV and radio personalities. He is no longer serving in this capacity.

Donoghue was a contestant in the 2007 Cleo Bachelor of The Year. During this time he was featured in the Cleo Bachelors Calendar.
