= Kimberley Crossman =

New Zealand actress (born 1990)

- Born: Kimberley Frances Crossman; 1990 (age 35–36); Auckland, New Zealand
- Citizenship: New Zealand; American
- Occupations: Actress, author, presenter, producer, writer, director, stand-up comedian, cheerleader
- Years active: 2006–present
- Spouse: Tom Walsh
- Children: 1
- Website: Official website

Kimberley Frances Crossman (born 1990) is a New Zealand-born American actress, author, presenter, producer, writer, director, dancer, stand-up comedian and cheerleader who is best known for her role as Sophie McKay on the New Zealand soap opera Shortland Street.

== Early life ==
In 2006 she was Deputy Head Girl at Diocesan School for Girls in Epsom, Auckland.

== Cheerleading/Dance ==
In 2006 she danced at the Royal New Zealand Ballet's season of Giselle. She was captain of the Total Cheerleading Senior Elite team in 2005 when they toured the United States and came 6th in The Cheerleading Worlds.

In 2008, Crossman was part of 'Dziah 2 Dream', a 10-week program run by Dziah.

== Acting ==
In January 2007, she started her role as Sophie McKay on New Zealand's best known and longest running show Shortland Street. In March 2011 Crossman left Shortland Street.

In October 2006, fans on Shortland Street fansite StreetTalk voted Crossman as Best rising star, and runner up for Hottest female.

In 2008, Crossman featured as Kerry Post in Beyond Belief, a short film in the 2008 48HOURS filmmaking competition, which was made by her former Shortland Street co-star Johnny Barker and also featured another of her fellow Shortland Street co-stars, Will Hall (aka Dr. Kip Denton). She has also featured in the special Nickelodeon Kids' Choice Awards programme in New Zealand.

Crossman starred as Stacey on the TVNZ2 show Step Dave which launched on TV2 on 11 February 2014. She co-starred with Kate Elliott in the horror Heavy metal comedy film Deathgasm and also appeared in the Three sketch comedy Funny Girls.

In October 2018, Crossman was announced to co-star in The Middle spin-off, Sue Sue in the City, however development of the series was cancelled the next month.

== Hosting ==
Crossman was a reporter on The Erin Simpson Show which ran from 2009 until 2013.

Crossman was a co-presenter on Cadbury Dream Factory which first aired in New Zealand on Three on 20 February 2014 alongside Brooke Howard-Smith, Guy Montgomery, Walter Neilands and Jesse Griffin.

Crossman is one of the rotating cast of hosts of the live trivia app Joyride.

== Personal life ==
Crossman began dating cameraman Tom Walsh in 2022 after meeting on the set of Snack Masters. Walsh is best known for starring in an iconic 2006 Tip Top commercial.

The couple became engaged in September 2023 while vacationing in Italy. In February 2023, She holds dual citizenship in New Zealand and the US. In November 2023, Crossman suffered a miscarriage. Crossman gave birth to a daughter in December 2025.

== Filmography ==
=== Television ===
Year	Title	Role	Notes
2000	WNTV	Herself	
2007–2012	Shortland Street	Sophie McKay	Regular role (334 episodes)
2011	The Talent Show	Aspen Carlson	Episodes: "Harper's Debut Party", "Episode #2.6"
2012	NCIS: Los Angeles	Barista	Episode: "Dead Body Politic"
2012	Power Rangers Samurai	Lauren/Red Samurai Ranger (XVIII)	5 episodes
2013	The Almighty Johnsons	Amelia Tennant	Episode: "Unleash The Kraken"
2013–2014	Auckland Daze	Herself	Recurring role (6 episodes)
2013	The Zelfs	Vampula (voice)	TV mini-series
2014	Cadbury Dream Factory	Herself	
2014	Step Dave	Stacey	Recurring role (11 episodes)
2014	#Besties	Kimmie	Episode: "#Besties Off"
2014	Flat3	Jessica	Episode: "The White Album"
2014	Black-ish	Tawnie	Episode: "Colored Commentary"
2015	Young & Hungry	Gracie	Episode: Young And Doppelganger
2015	Terry Teo	LiLy	Regular Role
2015	Kevin From Work	Carlene	1 Episode
2015	Bad Fruit	Kim	1 Episode
2015–2016	Funny Girls	Various	Regular Role
2016	Hashtaggers	Nikki Hart	Regular Role
2017	The Other Mother	Tiffany	TV movie
2019-2020	Golden Boy	Lisa	2 seasons Regular Role
2020	Survive the 80s	Herself	
2022	The Brokenwood Mysteries	Lisa Hunter	1 Episode
2022–2024	Snack Masters	Herself	

=== Film ===
Year	Title	Role	Notes
2008	Beyond Belief	Kerry Post	Short film, 48 Hours Film Festival runner up
2015	Deathgasm	Medina	
2015	A Beginner's Guide to Snuff	Actress #8	
2015	Fantasy Life	Summer Dale	
2016	The 60 Yard Line	Amy	
2017	The New Wife	Tiffany	
2017	Get You Back	Kimmie	
2018	Strangers in a Strange Land	Cassie	
2027	Deathgasm 2 - Goremageddon	Medina	

=== Music videos ===
- 5 Star Fallout – "Perfect Kind of Pain"
- Daecolm – "Love Thing"
- False Start – "What Will It Be Like"
- Secret Sky (Steven Skyler's band) – "The Secret"
- Dustin Tavella – "Everybody Knows"
