= Lucy Wigmore =

Australian–New Zealand actor (born 1977)

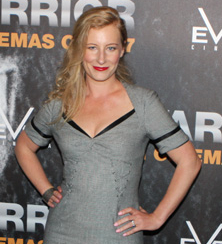
- Born: 1977 (age 48–49); Auckland, New Zealand
- Occupation: Actress
- Years active: 2002 – present
- Relatives: Gin Wigmore (sister) Jason Aalon Butler (brother-in-law)

Lucy Wigmore is a stage and screen actress from New Zealand. She played core cast member Dr Justine Jones in the long-running soap opera Shortland Street, and has also starred as Lillian May Armfield in Underbelly: Razor, a 13-part drama set in the 1920s–1930s on the rough and ready streets of Sydney, Australia. Underbelly "is one of Nine Networks most successful franchises". In 2015 Wigmore made a short film called Stationery which she wrote and directed.

== Personal life ==
Wigmore was raised in Auckland, New Zealand, where she attended Takapuna Grammar School. She studied international business and advertising at the Auckland University of Technology, and spent her final year of study in France.

Wigmore also completed a three-year Bachelor of Performing Arts (Acting) at Toi Whakaari New Zealand's National Drama School, graduating in 2002. She had her first AD and casting role in the Embrace Life Commercial for Sussex Safer Roads.

Wigmore's sister Gin is a singer and songwriter. Lucy directed one of Gin's music videos, 2016's "Willing to Die". One of Gin's songs, "Lucy Loo," was written for her sister.

== Filmography ==
Film
Year	Title	Role	Notes
2015	Interloafer	Harper Harrison	Dir: Aidee Walker
2014	Stationery	Celine	Tall Story Productions & Working Group Entertainment, Dir: Lucy Wigmore
2014	The Land	Loretta	Dir/Producer: Steven Rodgers/Ingvar Kenne
2010	Sign Language	Director/Writer	London Film Academy
2007	The Last Magic Show	Margot	Dir: Andrew Conlan
2008	Ash & Libby	Ash	Twilight Productions, Dir: Mark Prebble
2007	Adventures of Spectacularman	Female Sidekick	Twilight Productions, Dir: Mark Prebble
2005	Spring Flames	Gwen Madden (Lead)	Seannanchie Productions, Dir: Aileen O'Sullivan
2005	King Kong	Theatre patron	Universal Studios, Dir: Peter Jackson
2002	For Good	Reporter	MAP Productions, Dir: Stuart McKenzie

Television
Year	Title	Role	Notes
2018	Westside	Shona	Episode: 3.8
2013	Love Child (TV series)	Carol	Nine Network
2012	Tricky Business (Australian TV series)	Harriet Lipson	Screentime
2011	Panic at Rock Island	Band member	Uncredited
2011	Underbelly: Razor	Lillian May Armfield	13 Ep's Core Cast, Screentime
2007 - 2009	Shortland Street	Dr Justine Jones	Lead Role (2 years) South Pacific Pictures
2007	Eating Media Lunch	Josephine Smythe	Great Southern Television
2007	Orange Roughies	Martine Crawford	Screenworks

Theatre
Year	Title	Role	Notes
2011	The Sweetest Thing	Bella	Belvoir St Theatre, Dir: Sarah Goodes
2010	Cat and Mouse	Director	La Mama Theatre (Melbourne)
2009	As You Like It	Rosalind	Hen & Chickens Theatre, London, Dir: Roanna Dalziel
2009	A Simple Procedure	Lex, Troy, Wendy	Last Night Productions, Pleasance Theatre, London
2009	The Night Before Christmas	Krissy	Shaky Isles London
2007	Look Back in Anger	Helena	Dir: Miranda Harcourt, Bats Theatre & Silo Theatres
2007	Salon 71	Self-Devised solo show	Silo Theatre, Dir: Ben Crowder
2007	The Women	Mary Haines	NZ National Tour, Dir: Katie Wolfe
2006	Disgrace	Various	Auckland Theatre Company
2004	Cloud Nine	Maud/Betty	Silo Theatre, Dir: Edwin Wright
2003	Othello	Bianca	Centrepoint Theatre, Dir: Alison Quigan
2003	Middle Age Spread	Judy	Centrepoint Theatre, Dir: Jonathan Hendry
2002	Road	Carol/Valerie	Studio 77, Dir: Larry Rew
2002	One Flew Over the Cuckoo's Nest	Nurse Flinn	Circa Theatre, Dir: Andrew Foster
2002	Leah	Burgundy/Gloucester's Servant	NZ Actors Company, Dir: Simon Bennett
