= Jason Daniel =

Australian screenwriter

Jason Daniel is an Australian writer and producer with extensive experience working in TV drama.

== Biography ==
Daniel was a journalist before becoming a writer and story editor on Neighbours, after which he created a number of long-running TV series around the world, including the first daily serials in New Zealand, Sweden, Finland and Hungary.

In the early 1990s Daniel moved to New Zealand to set up Shortland Street as a story editor. He then worked in Europe for a number of years, creating long-running series in Germany, Sweden, Finland and Hungary - including "Worlds Apart" (Sweden), Salatut elämät (Finland), Between Friends (Hungary) and In Search of Paradise (Germany). In 2002 he was appointed head of drama development at Fremantle Media.

Daniel also worked in Asia and Africa and the US, before returning to Shortland Street as producer from 2005 to 2008. During his time on the show he suggested the journalists adage, ‘”a good story is one that someone, somewhere doesn’t want told”, should also apply to drama; If you start thinking we couldn’t do that to a character could we? then you pretty much know you almost certainly should.’" Among the stories he oversaw during this time was the Ferndale Strangler. He also criticised TVNZ for censoring the show by asking them to pull a male gay couple storyline. It was announced shortly afterwards that Daniel would be leaving Shortland Street to pursue other projects. According to South Pacific's head of drama, Simon Bennett:

As Producer of Shortland Street, Jason has revamped the look of the programme, introducing all new hospital sets and uniforms, a raft of intriguing characters, and has been instrumental in the development of such successful storylines as last year’s top-rating serial killer story. Under Jason’s stewardship, Shortland Street has consistently rated in the top five programmes in TV2′s 18 to 39 demographic. Jason has been a key part of Shortland Street’s many years of success for TV2. He played a pivotal role in establishing the show as story editor 16 years ago and after three and a half years in the Producer’s chair, he leaves the show in excellent shape.

In 2010 Daniel was appointed script producer of Home and Away. During his time on the show he created the River Boys. Daniel left Home and Away at the end of 2010.

== Selected credits ==
- Neighbours (1989-94) - story editor, writer
- Skilda världar ("Worlds Apart" - Sweden) - creator, showrunner
- Mallorca – Suche nach dem Paradies (In Search of Paradise - Germany) - creator, showrunner
- Salatut elämät ("Concealed Lives" - Finland) - creator, showrunner
- "Baratok Kozt" (Between Friends - Hungary) - creator, showrunner
- Shortland Street - story editor (1992), producer (2005–08)
- Home and Away (2010) - script producer
