= List of Shortland Street characters introduced in 2010 =

The following is a list of characters that first appeared in the New Zealand soap opera Shortland Street in 2010, by order of first appearance.

== Loren Fitzpatrick ==
Loren Fitzpatrick
- Shortland Street character
- Portrayed by: Sophia Johnson
- Duration: 2010
- First appearance: 20 January 2010
- Last appearance: 22 June 2010
- Introduced by: Steven Zanoski
In-universe information
- Occupation: Sugar Cafe employee
- Father: Reuben Fitzpatrick
- Stepmother: Jewel Fitzpatrick
- Brothers: Philip Fitzpatrick

Loren Fitzpatrick was the vegetarian love interest for Daniel Potts (Ido Drent). After meeting at the cafe where Loren worked, the two started to date and Loren pressured Daniel to take up activism much to the annoyance of Daniel's mother Sarah (Amanda Billing). Loren turned out to be from a troubled home where she spent much of her time caring for her autistic brother. Daniel pressured Loren into sex and she seemed reluctant and blamed much of her social angst on her father Reuben Fitzpatrick (David Aston). The two did eventually become sexually active and Loren fell pregnant after a condom mishap. Though at first wanting to keep the baby, Loren was talked around by Sarah and ended up having an abortion before she fled the country.

== Heather Sloane ==
Heather Sloane
- Shortland Street character
- Portrayed by: Jan Saussey
- Duration: 2010
- First appearance: 10 February 2010
- Last appearance: 12 February 2010
- Introduced by: Steven Zanoski

Heather Sloane was the ex-girlfriend of Ben Goodall (Shaun Edwards-Brown). Heather was a patient and significantly older than Ben, thus bring great shock to Ben's ex lover – Tania Jeffries (Faye Smythe) when Heather confessed she and Ben had dated for 5 years and she had, in fact, paid his paramedic fees. Tania suspected Ben of being a gold digger and may have been after her mother, Yvonne's (Alison Quigan) money. Heather had cancer and though reassured of her safety by Ben, died on the operating table in February.

== Brodie Kemp ==
Brodie Kemp
- Shortland Street character
- Portrayed by: Ari Boyland
- Duration: 2010–11
- First appearance: 1 March 2010
- Last appearance: 23 May 2011
- Introduced by: Steven Zanoski
In-universe information
- Occupation: Co-owner of The IV (2010–11)
- Sisters: Emily Kemp; Julie Kemp

Brodie Kemp was the immature med school friend of Hunter McKay (Lee Donoghue). Brodie arrived in March and proved poor for Hunter's relationship with Tracey (Sarah Thomson) when he burnt his arm seriously and asked her to steal equipment to heal it. He returned several months later, dropped out of med school and started to flat with Hunter and new girl - Penny Rourke (Carolyn Dando). Brodie was attracted to Penny and became bitter when she started to date Hunter. He fell in love with Sophie (Kimberley Crossman) but settled for Bella Cooper (Amelia Reid), who he soon fell in love with as well. He bought The IV with Bella's father, Murray (Matthew Chamberlain). However, with little money he was forced to take out a loan from some loan sharks. In 2011 Brodie's financial secrets ruined his relationship with Bella when she suspected he was cheating. However they soon reconciled and Murray bought Brodie out of the bar. Brodie soon started doing jobs for the terminally ill - Regan Ames (George Mason). When Brodie began to question Regan's illness, Regan set him up with class A drugs and Brodie was forced to flee New Zealand to escape some drug lords.

== Isaac Worthington ==
Isaac Worthington
- Shortland Street character
- Portrayed by: Matt Minto
- Duration: 2010–11
- First appearance: 8 March 2010
- Last appearance: 31 March 2011
- Introduced by: Steven Zanoski
In-universe information
- Occupation: Surgeon (2010-11)
- Father: Desmond Worthington
- Mother: Cecile Worthington
- Brothers: Joseph Worthington (adoptive)
- Uncles: Sir Bruce Warner; Garth Worthington
- Aunts: Lady Margot Warner
- First cousins: Chris Warner; Amanda Warner; Guy Warner

Dr. Isaac John William Worthington was the playboy cousin of Chris Warner (Michael Galvin). Quickly after getting a job at the clinic, Isaac's intentions were clear when he attempted to romance both Libby Jeffries (Fleur Saville) and Tracey Morrison (Sarah Thomson). He briefly dated Tania (Faye Smythe) and Harry's (Reid Walker) primary school teacher before he started an intense feud with Luke Durville (Gerald Urquhart). He reconciled with Tania but cheated on her with Zoe (Gina Varela). He started to date Brooke Freeman (Beth Allen) but his overspending resulted in a lock on his trustfund and Isaac was forced to participate in an illegal operation to fund his yacht. The gang members involved ended up kidnapping Luke and when he was discovered alive in 2011, Isaac was forced to frame him for drug addiction so that he would not discover the truth. Bella Cooper (Ameila Reid) started to piece together the puzzle and Isaac got engaged to her to put her off the scent. They broke up however and Isaac finally got hold of his money but Luke returned knowing the truth and after attempting to murder his uncle, Isaac ended up fleeing the country without Brooke as he hoped. He was last seen in March stranded in the Philippines after his trust fund was again locked.

== Astrid Chapel ==
Astrid Chapel
- Shortland Street character
- Portrayed by: Andi Crown
- Duration: 2010, 2012
- First appearance: 12 March 2010
- Last appearance: 9 February 2012
- Introduced by: Steven Zanoski (2010, 2012)
In-universe information
- Mother: Julie Chapel

Astrid Chapel was the drug addict who stabbed Hunter McKay (Lee Donoghue) in the arm with a needle during a botched burglary of an ambulance. Astrid and her junkie friend attempted to rob an ambulance whilst paramedic - Hunter was in it. Astrid ended up stabbing Hunter when he refused to hand over morphine. This left Hunter with an HIV scare and whilst Hunter waited for the results, his sister Sophie (Kimberley Crossman), organised an interview with Astrid. Astrid expressed guilt over the incident but was verbally abused by both Hunter and Callum McKay (Peter Mochrie) who arrived to save Sophie. Astrid was later in the same rehab group as Hunter when he fell victim to drug addiction and showed hatred at Hunter's "rich boy" ways as she was born a drug addict. She set him up with false drugs and got him expelled from the clinic.

== Frankie Hull ==
Frankie Hull
- Shortland Street character
- Portrayed by: Anoushka Klaus
- Duration: 2010
- First appearance: 15 March 2010
- Last appearance: 28 April 2010
- Introduced by: Steven Zanoski

Frankie Hull was the flamboyant party girl that worked at the bureau. Frankie first appeared when she showed attraction towards Isaac Worthington (Matt Minto), annoying Tracey (Sarah Thomson). She later went out drinking with Scotty (Kiel McNaughton) and returned home with him only to be kicked out by Tracey. She returned the next month and began a casual friendship with Hunter McKay (Lee Donoghue). The two agreed to go on a date but when Hunter saw her being judgmental towards a man who had attempted suicide, he broke it off, frustrated that she would likely judge his possible HIV status. Frankie hoped for a reconciliation but was declined.

== Reuben Fitzpatrick ==
Reuben Fitzpatrick
- Shortland Street character
- Portrayed by: David Aston
- Duration: 2010
- First appearance: 16 March 2010
- Last appearance: July 2010
- Introduced by: Steven Zanoski
In-universe information
- Wife: Jewel Fitzpatrick
- Sons: Philip Fitzpatrick
- Daughters: Loren Fitzpatrick

Dr. Reuben Fitzpatrick was the eccentric father of Loren (Sophia Johnson) and director of the acting group, the Ferndale Players. Amateur actors, Yvonne Jeffries (Alison Quigan), Ben Goodall (Shaun Edwards-Brown), Gerald Tippett (Harry McNaughton) and Daniel Potts (Ido Drent), all joined the club and were taken aback by Reuben's dominating personality. It was soon revealed he was suffering from a brain tumour and he apologized for his behaviour. He returned months later as a doctor at Sarah's (Amanda Billing) GP clinic. He was pleased his daughter was pregnant and encouraged Daniel to fight for his child. However, when Reuben learned Sarah had encouraged Loren to get an abortion, he cut ties with her and attempted to sabotage her business before he quit to avoid legal action.

== Jewel Fitzpatrick ==
Reuben Fitzpatrick
- Shortland Street character
- Portrayed by: Vicki Edwards-Brown
- Duration: 2010
- First appearance: 16 March 2010
- Last appearance: 4 April 2010
- Introduced by: Steven Zanoski
In-universe information
- Husband: Reuben Fitzpatrick
- Stepsons: Philip Fitzpatrick
- Stepdaughters: Loren Fitzpatrick

Jewel Fitzpatrick was the much younger wife of Reuben Fitzpatrick (David Aston). She was introduced as a possible love interest for Ben Goodall (Shaun Edwards-Brown) and was portrayed by Edwards-Brown's real life wife, Vicki. Vicki was part of her husband Reuben's drama group and was one of the lead roles alongside Ben. Jewel and Reuben's relationship was on the rocks and Jewel began to flirt with Ben to make Reuben jealous, infuriating Ben's partner Yvonne (Alison Quigan). Following Reuben's diagnosis of a brain tumour, the two reconciled and Jewel performed in the play to a successful review.

== Doug Morrison ==
Doug Morrison
- Portrayed by: Richard Knowles
- Duration: 2010
- First appearance: 26 March 2010
- Last appearance: 3 May 2010
- Introduced by: Steven Zanoski
In-universe information
- Occupation: Policeman (until 2010)
- Father: Gordon Morrison
- Mother: Kate Morrison
- Brothers: David Morrison; Peter Morrison
- Sisters: Tracey Morrison
- Wife: Teresa Morrison (until 2009)

Doug Morrison was the corrupt policeman brother of Tracey Morrison (Sarah Thomson). Doug reentered Tracey's life when he landed a case in Auckland and immediately clashed with Tracey's flatmate. Scotty (Kiel McNaughton). Doug soon started to date Tania Jeffries (Faye Smythe), but it was clear he was hiding something and Doug finally admitted to Tracey he had fallen in with gangs and was illegally sabotaging their crime scenes. An upset Tracey agreed not to let the secret out but once Doug had left town, the guilt got to her and she got her brother arrested.

== Leslie Grant ==
Leslie Grant
- Portrayed by: Paul Holmes
- Duration: 2010
- Appears on: 4 April 2010
- Introduced by: Steven Zanoski
In-universe information
- Occupation: Actor

Leslie Grant was an actor who participated in the play Yvonne Jeffries (Alison Quigan) was directing. He was portrayed by broadcaster Paul Holmes, in a cameo appearance for Easter 2010. Leslie proved both arrogant and irritating, however turned out to be an amazing actor. Leslie's arrogance got the better of him however, when he knocked himself out mid show, accidentally locking himself in his dressing room.

== Zoe Archer ==
Zoe Archer
- Portrayed by: Gina Varela
- Duration: 2010
- First appearance: 3 May 2010
- Last appearance: 3 August 2010
- Introduced by: Steven Zanoski
In-universe information
- Occupation: Dietitian
- Sons: Dallas Archer

Zoe Archer was the dietitian love interest for Chris Warner (Michael Galvin), who debuted in April 2010 as part of deaf awareness week. Zoe's son – Dallas (Zaire Armstrong) was deaf and Zoe came to a deaf awareness function to plee for Chris to operate on him. Chris did so and briefly became romantically involved with Zoe, however the surgery went wrong and Dallas got a severe reaction. Zoe broke it off with Chris and departed. She returned later in the year in a more central role. Zoe returned and reconciled with Chris, although she made it clear she was not interested in sex. Chris was devastated when he discovered Zoe had slept with his cousin Isaac (Matt Minto) in a sick attempt to seek revenge for the failed surgery on Dallas. Zoe was last seen belittling Isaac and making it obvious she had used him.

Hugh Sundae of The New Zealand Herald, criticized Varela's acting, calling it "awkward".

== Leanne Miller ==
Leanne Miller first appeared in April 2010 and was portrayed by Jennifer Ludlam. She reprised the role in 2011 and again in 2014. She departed in September 2016. She later returned after her husband Howard Black died. She has recently reconciled with Damo Johnston after a near death experience caused by Erin Landry.

== Eric Miller ==
Eric Miller
- Portrayed by: Mick Andrews
- Duration: 2010, 2014
- First appearance: 27 April 2010
- Last appearance: 19 March 2014
- Introduced by: Steven Zanoski (2010); Simon Bennett (2014)
In-universe information
- Occupation: Dock worker
- Father: William Miller
- Mother: Leanne Miller
- Sisters: Nicole Miller
- Half-brothers: Eddie Adams
- Half-sisters: Morgan Braithwaite
- Grandmothers: Grandma Miller
- Nephews: Pele Kruse

Eric Miller was the schizophrenic brother of Nicole (Sally Martin). Nicole was initially hesitant to leave Tauranga with girlfriend – Maia Jeffries (Anna Jullienne) as she felt the need to nurse Eric, however Eric revealed he was back on his medication and under good eyes, allowing Nicole to finally let go. In 2012 Eric had a severe episode and Nicole was forced to return to Tauranga to nurse him. Nicole and Vinnie (Pua Magasiva) visited Eric in 2014 when Leanne complained of his laziness. A week later, Eric and Leanne moved to Auckland and Nicole successfully moved Eric into care away from his overbearing mother. Several years later Leanne visited Eric and met his two children. In 2017 Eric was arrested for drug smuggling in Thailand and Leanne visited him to help financially.

== Henry Mapasua ==
Henry Mapasua
- Portrayed by: Victor Rodger
- Duration: 2010
- First appearance: 27 April 2010
- Last appearance: 14 June 2010
- Introduced by: Steven Zanoski
In-universe information
- Occupation: Dentist conman

Henry Mapasua was the childhood friend of Maxwell Avia (Robbie Magasiva). Henry reentered Maxwell's life in 2010 and got on well with his girlfriend Sarah (Amanda Billing). The two went into partnership with Henry's dentistry opening in Sarah's GP clinic. Henry encouraged Kieran Mitchell (Adam Rickitt) and Isaac Worthington (Matt Minto) to invest in his favourite horse but it soon became clear Henry was a conman and was using their money to his benefit. Kieran and Jane (Sia Trokenheim) successfully conned Henry out of thousands of dollars and Maxwell ended up calling the police on him. An upset Henry blamed the con on stress from the 2009 Samoa earthquake and tsunami and was arrested when he attempted to flee the country.

== Jane Perry ==
Jane Perry
- Shortland Street character
- Portrayed by: Sia Trokenheim
- Duration: 2010
- First appearance: 11 May 2010
- Last appearance: 30 June 2010
- Introduced by: Steven Zanoski
In-universe information
- Occupation: Former IV Barmaid; Former prostitute

Jane Perry was the barmaid who anonymously blackmailed Kieran Mitchell (Adam Rickitt) about the hit and run death of Morgan Braithwaite (Bonnie Soper). Kieran hired Jane to be a barmaid at the bar and began to get mysterious blackmail letters. It was soon clear to the audience that Jane was the culprit and Kieran tricked her into confessing which resulted in him taking her hostage. Jane admitted to formerly being a prostitute and having slept with Kieran's brother - Sean (Thijs Morris), who had confessed the crime. The two's rivalry resulted in an affair and they ended up conning Henry (Victor Rodger) out of several thousand dollars. Kieran paid Jane to leave but she returned several weeks later and attempted to blackmail him into leaving with her. She assaulted Kieran which ended in serious brain injury. Jane eventually ended up fleeing after the tables turned and Kieran blackmailed her on assault charges.

== Ashton Fuller ==
Ashton Fuller
- Shortland Street character
- Portrayed by: Bryce Langston
- Duration: 2010
- First appearance: 13 May 2010
- Last appearance: 29 July 2010
- Introduced by: Steven Zanoski
In-universe information
- Occupation: University lecturer

Ashton Fuller was the stalker university lecturer of Sophie McKay (Kimberley Crossman). Sophie believed Ashton had been sleeping with his students and in turn giving them good results and set out to prove the rumours right, however Ashton discovered the plot and played Sophie along so as to embarrass her in front of the whole class. Following her separation from Kieran Mitchell (Adam Rickitt) a month later, Sophie ended up dating Ashton to make Kieran jealous. However Ashton proved to be dominating and possessive and Sophie broke up with him only to be stalked mercilessly for several weeks. Kieran discovered it was Ashton and nearly murdered him by drowning him in a bath tub before warning him off Sophie.

== Gordon Morrison ==
Gordon Morrison
- Shortland Street character
- Portrayed by: John Chalmers
- Duration: 2010
- First appearance: 20 May 2010
- Last appearance: 24 May 2010
- Introduced by: Steven Zanoski
In-universe information
- Occupation: Retired policeman
- Wife: Kate Morrison
- Sons: David Morrison; Peter Morrison; Doug Morrison
- Daughters: Tracey Morrison
- Grandsons: Kitu Scott (adopted)

Gordon Morrison was the stubborn father of Tracey Morrison (Sarah Thomson). Gordon was a retired policeman and fiercely proud of his line of work, he and his wife Kate (Margaret-Mary Hollins) visited Tracey and Gordon was rushed to hospital due to health problems. When Gordon learned his son – Doug (Richard Knowles), was a corrupt cop, he was disgusted and got him arrested. Later in the year Gordon showed disapproval of Tracey's engagement to Scotty (Kiel McNaughton).

== Kate Morrison ==
Kate Morrison
- Shortland Street character
- Portrayed by: Margaret-Mary Hollins
- Duration: 2010
- First appearance: 20 May 2010
- Last appearance: 24 May 2010
- Introduced by: Steven Zanoski
In-universe information
- Occupation: Retired
- Husband: Gordon Morrison
- Sons: David Morrison; Peter Morrison; Doug Morrison
- Daughters: Tracey Morrison
- Grandsons: Kitu Scott (adopted)

Kate Morrison was the mother of Tracey Morrison (Sarah Thomson). Kate and her husband Gordon (John Chalmers), visited Tracey in May 2010 and after Gordon was hospitalized, Tracey was shocked to learn Kate already knew her son Doug (Richard Knowles), was a corrupt cop and was hiding it from Gordon. When Gordon found out, he was infuriated and had Doug arrested. Later in the year Kate showed disapproval of Tracey's engagement to Scotty (Kiel McNaughton).

== Anita Goodall ==
Anita Goodall
- Shortland Street character
- Portrayed by: Lara Fischel-Chisholm
- Duration: 2010
- First appearance: 3 June 2010
- Last appearance: 8 June 2010
- Introduced by: Steven Zanoski
In-universe information
- Brothers: Ben Goodall
- Sisters: Emily Goodall

Anita Goodall was the controlling younger sister of Ben Goodall (Shaun Edwards-Brown). She arrived when she learned Ben was brain dead and was reluctant to get to know his partner Yvonne (Alison Quigan). Anita held the false hope Ben could come back alive but was eventually consulted through the ordeal by Yvonne and Hunter (Lee Donoghue). Anita admitted she had not talked to Ben for years following his relationship with Heather (Jan Saussey) and finally turned off his life support. She and Yvonne travelled down to Christchurch for his funeral.

== Wendy Cooper ==
Wendy Cooper was the low income earner, matriarch of the Cooper family. She arrived in June 2010 when she was hired to work for Sarah Potts' (Amanda Billing) GP clinic.

== Annette Freeman ==
Annette Freeman
- Portrayed by: Louise Wallace
- Duration: 2010, 2011, 2012
- First appearance: 28 June 2010
- Last appearance: 14 August 2012
- Introduced by: Steven Zanoski (2010, 2011, 2012)
In-universe information
- Other names: Annette Freeman (maiden name); Annette Marsden (married name)
- Husband: Grant Marsden (until 1999)
- Daughters: Brooke Rolleston; Bree Hamilton

Annette Freeman (previously Marsden) was Brooke's (Beth Allen) alcoholic mother. Annette arrived in June 2010 and quickly embarrassed Brooke by getting drunk and chatting up her ex-boyfriend TK Samuels (Benjamin Mitchell). She slept with the engaged, William Nungent (Andrew Clay) and ended up fleeing when she learned Brooke may have cancer. In 2011 Brooke was driven to a bach where Annette was staying by Winston Youn (Min Kim) and Annette apologized hugely for her behaviour and admitted Winston was Brooke's childhood maid's son. In December it was revealed that Annette had a secret daughter named Bree (Rachel Blampied), whom she had adopted out at birth so as to stay with her husband Grant (Alan Lovell). Annette returned in 2012 and refused to accept Bree, resulting in Bree holding her hostage, mentally torturing her and manipulating Brooke into thinking Annette had lost her mind. Disgusted at Bree, Annette ended up being kicked out by Brooke for her treatment of her daughter. In September 2013, Brooke visited Annette for a month in Sydney.

== Penny Rourke ==
Paula Sinclair
- Portrayed by: Carolyn Dando
- Duration: 2010
- First appearance: 7 July 2010
- Last appearance: 1 September 2010
- Introduced by: Steven Zanoski
In-universe information
- Other names: Penny Rourke
- Father: Greg Sinclair
- Mother: Delaney Sinclair

Paula Sinclair (also known as Penny Rourke) was the mysterious orderly who started to date Hunter McKay (Lee Donoghue). However it soon became apparent Penny had a larger agenda when she began to stalk Scotty (Kiel McNaughton) and ended up trying to murder him by poison and then by attempted arson. In August, Penny kidnapped Scotty and revealed that he may have killed her father in East Timor during army service. Scotty informed Penny that her father was a rapist and a distraught Penny ended up shooting him before fleeing. Hunter was disgusted to learn the truth and when Penny asked for help to escape New Zealand, he handed her in to the police.

== Gus Afeaki ==
Gus Afeaki
- Portrayed by: Joe Folau
- Duration: 2010, 2012
- First appearance: 12 July 2010
- Last appearance: 7 December 2012
- Introduced by: Steven Zanoski (2010, 2012)
In-universe information
- Sons: Jared Afeaki

Gus Afeaki was a gang affiliated criminal who held a dairy owner hostage in his own dairy. Maxwell Avia (Robbie Magasiva) entered the dairy and successfully convinced Gus to hand himself into police. In 2012 Chris (Michael Galvin) discovered Gus was his cellmate in prison and though the two initially clashed, they soon found an understanding together. Gus helped Chris in prison but was soon diagnosed with serious skin cancer. It turned terminal and Gus eventually reconciled with his gang member son, Jared Afeaki (Beulah Koale) and controversially fell in love with his nurse Vasa Levi (Teuila Blakely). After being forced out of Vasa's home, Gus died surrounded by his family in December 2012.

== Ula Levi ==
Ula Levi
- Shortland Street character
- Portrayed by: Frankie Adams
- Duration: 2010–15
- First appearance: 12 July 2010
- Last appearance: 27 February 2015
- Introduced by: Steven Zanoski
In-universe information
- Occupation: Paramedic (2013—)
- Mother: Vasa Levi
- Stepfather: Maxwell Avia
- Sons: Adam Vailalo

Ula Levi was the girl Maxwell Avia (Robbie Magasiva) had brought up believing she was his daughter. She arrived in July 2010 when she ran away from her mother - Vasa (Teuila Blakely) and her abusive husband. Ula decided to stay in Ferndale and started to bully Jasmine Cooper (Pearl McGlashan). Ula developed a crush on Phoenix Raynor (Geordie Holibar) but it was unrequited. In 2011 Phoenix mistook a love letter to be from Ula and they dated but later he dumped her for Jasmine. Ula fell for older man - Holden Smith (Rudi Vodanovich) but when he proved dangerous, Ula narrowly escaped getting raped. She began to date Tom Stanton (Henry Beasley) and shockingly fell pregnant with his child. Evan Cooper (Tyler Read) pretended to be the father and the two briefly dated before the truth was revealed. Ula's baby was adopted out and she dated her foster brother Jared Afeaki (Beulah Koale) for several months. Upon her son Adam re-entering her life, Ula attempted to reclaim him but adjusted to occasional visits. She began training to become a paramedic and fell in love with Garrett Whitley (Spencer Falls). However Garrett's womanizing ways proved too much and Ula found love with her long time crush Dallas Adams (Cameron Jones) and left to travel the world with him. In September 2015, Maxwell passed on Ula's congratulations at Vinnie's (Pua Magasiva) wedding.

== Vasa Levi ==
Vasa Levi
- Shortland Street character
- Portrayed by: Teuila Blakely
- Duration: 2010, 2011–14
- First appearance: 19 July 2010
- Last appearance: 11 July 2014
- Introduced by: Steven Zanoski (2010, 2011)
In-universe information
- Occupation: Nurse
- Husband: Maxwell Avia (until 2001)
- Daughters: Ula Levi
- Grandsons: Adam Vailalo

Vasa Levi first appeared in several guest stints in 2010 and 2011 before becoming a regular character in August 2011. She was the fiery ex-wife of Maxwell Avia (Robbie Magasiva). She arrived in July to take back her daughter Ula (Frankie Adams) but ended up staying when she realised she still loved Maxwell. She departed back to Wellington but returned when Maxwell expressed romantic interest however after a one-night stand, Maxwell broke it off. Vasa bought a house in Auckland so Ula could continue seeing her "dad". Vasa returned in February 2011 when she took the job of relieving director of nursing. She admitted she was still in love with Maxwell but became smitten with Murray (Matthew Chamberlain) and the two shared a kiss. When Vasa realised she may have broken the Cooper family, she again departed. She took the job permanently in August and was harshly shut down by Luke Durville (Gerald Urquhart) on a date. In 2012 Vasa had a brief but controversial affair with Zac Smith (Mike Edward) that lead to isolation from her peers. As the year ended, she fell in love with terminal patient Gus Afeaki (Joe Folau) that resulted in her demotion following his death. Vasa reconnected with her abusive ex-boyfriend Travis Corfield (John Tui) and entered into business with him. However his abusive side returned and when he ended up dead, Vasa was arrested for his murder but later cleared. Not too long afterwards, Vasa and the recently returned Sam begin to date. The two depart Ferndale to live in a small, remote island.

== Russell Turner ==
Russell "White Dragon" Turner
- Shortland Street character
- Portrayed by: Matt Sunderland
- Duration: 2010
- Appears on: 2 August 2010
- Introduced by: Steven Zanoski
In-universe information
- Occupation: Gang member

Russell "White Dragon" Turner was the gang member who had a past with Kieran Mitchell (Adam Rickitt) in Thailand. White Dragon tracked Kieran down with plans to film his death in a bid to seek revenge for Kieran stealing his money. Kieran escaped however and after a chase through the forest, the two ended up fighting on a cliff edge. Keiran's brother Sean (Thijs Morris) tackled the two off the edge and White Dragon ended up plunging to his death, followed by Kieran's self-sacrifice.

== Brian Raynor ==
Brian Raynor
- Shortland Street character
- Portrayed by: Ian Mune
- Duration: 2010, 2011, 2012
- First appearance: 2 August 2010
- Last appearance: 1 June 2012
- Introduced by: Steven Zanoski (2010, 2011, 2012)
In-universe information
- Occupation: Farmer
- Brothers: Kevin Raynor
- Nieces: Alison Raynor

Brian Raynor was the uncle of Alison (Danielle Cormack). Brian had raised Alison's teenage son Phoenix (Geordie Holibar) since Alison died in 2009 but arrived in 2010 to inform Chris (Michael Galvin) of his ex-wives death and introduce him to his son. In 2011 Phoenix learned Brian had been in an accident in his Southland farm and travelled down to learn Brian had suffered a nervous breakdown after arguments with the neighboring farm. Phoenix sorted the feud out and Brian eventually accepted his neighbours. Brian briefly returned in 2012 to visit Phoenix following Chris' arrest for murder.

== Phoenix Raynor ==
Phoenix Raynor is the son of Chris Warner (Michael Galvin) and Alison Raynor (Danielle Cormack).

== Evan Cooper ==
Evan Cooper
- Shortland Street character
- Portrayed by: Tyler Read
- Duration: 2010–14, 2016
- First appearance: 16 August 2010
- Last appearance: 26 January 2016
- Introduced by: Steven Zanoski (2010); Simon Bennett (2016)
In-universe information
- Occupation: Kitchen hand (2011–13, 2014—); Entrepreneur (2013—); Student (2014); Founder and manager of 'Home Perfect' (2013–14); Cleaner (2013–14)
- Father: Murray Cooper
- Mother: Wendy Cooper
- Sisters: Bella Cooper; Jasmine Cooper
- Grandfathers: Alistair; Len Cooper
- Grandmothers: Judy Cooper
- Nieces: Stevie Isaac

Evan Cooper was the only boy in the Cooper family who arrived in August 2010. Wendy (Jacqueline Nairn) suspected her son of using the hospital social club's credit card, however it turned out to be his sister Jasmine (Pearl McGlashan). Evan started to drink to spite his father Murray (Matthew Chamberlain) who had been absent for a majority of Evan's life. He faced potential spine damage when he drunkenly fell from a tree and later ran away from home and accidentally set alight to a building he had been living in. He received community service for his crimes and before long Evan developed a crush on his nemesis Ula Levi (Frankie Adams). Evan and Ula began to date and he pretended to be the father of her baby before the two broke it off despite Evan still having feelings for her. He eventually controversially moved on to nurse Kylie (Kerry-Lee Dewing) and started a cleaning business with the help of Rachel McKenna. Kylie left him and Evan began to date foster sister Dayna Jenkins (Lucy Elliott). The business fell through and Evan started to attend university before he broke it off with Dayna and fell in love with married women Marnie Dougan (Hannah Gould). However, after his parents meddled in his affair, Evan decided to take a job as a kitchen hand on a boat sailing the world. He departed in September 2014. Bella (Amelia Reid-Meredith) and Murray Cooper (Matthew Chamberlain) visited Evan in Fiji the following year.

In January 2016, Evan returned to Ferndale after his mother's (Wendy Cooper) life support was turned off. Wendy was shot in the heart during the 2015 Cliffhanger Episode which saw gunman Gareth Hutchins hold the 2015 Children's Christmas Party hostage. Evan stayed for the funeral, then departed Ferndale, taking a flight out the next morning to return to his cruise ship job.

== Jasmine Cooper ==
Jasmine Cooper
- Shortland Street character
- Portrayed by: Pearl McGlashan
- Duration: 2010–13, 2016
- First appearance: 19 August 2010
- Introduced by: Steven Zanoski (2010); Simon Bennett (2016)
In-universe information
- Father: Murray Cooper
- Mother: Wendy Cooper
- Brothers: Evan Cooper
- Sisters: Bella Cooper
- Grandfathers: Alistair; Len Cooper
- Grandmothers: Judy Cooper
- Nieces: Stevie Isaac

Jasmine Cooper was the nerdy youngest daughter of the Cooper family. She arrived in August when Wendy (Jacqueline Nairn) learned Jasmine was being bullied by Ula Levi (Frankie Adams), leading her to steal from the hospital. Jasmine developed a crush on Phoenix Raynor (Geordie Holibar) and the two began to date in March 2011. However Phoenix cheated on her and the two break up before having a rocky reconciliation. At Phoenix's 16th party, Jasmine had a heart attack and after narrowly surviving, she was diagnosed with Long QT syndrome. Her near death experience caused Jasmine to become obsessed with all things dark and after several family interventions and warnings from Phoenix, Jasmine finally recovered from incident in December 2011 and shortly after, Phoenix ended their relationship. Jasmine fell in love with Colombian exchange student Angel Souza (Jesse-James Rehu Pickery) and converted to Catholicism to stay with him. Despite pledging her life to him, he departed to become a priest, leaving Jasmine heart broken. She rebounded by sleeping with Jared Afeaki (Beulah Koale) and befriending the gang-affiliated Dayna Jenkins (Lucy Elliott). In August 2013, Jasmine left Ferndale for an exchange in Colombia. Wendy visited her the following year when she broke her leg.

In January 2016, Jasmine returned to Ferndale after her mother's (Wendy Cooper) life support was turned off. Wendy was shot in the heart during the 2015 Cliffhanger Episode which saw gunman Gareth Hutchins hold the 2015 Children's Christmas Party hostage. She then contracted yellow fever after her expedition in Columbia, but was saved by George Kirkwood, a medical school graduate with experience in infectious disease clinics in London.

== Bella Durville ==
Bella Durville (née Cooper) is the oldest child of Wendy (Jacqueline Nairn) and Murray Cooper (Matthew Chamberlain). She arrived to the hospital in September 2010 after getting dropped from beauty school and quickly became a receptionist. She was married to Luke Durville who worked as an anesthetist for Shortland Street Hospital until his death.

== Jennifer Mason ==
Jennifer Mason
- Shortland Street character
- Portrayed by: Sara Wiseman
- Duration: 2010–11
- First appearance: 20 September 2010
- Last appearance: 2 February 2011
- Introduced by: Steven Zanoski
In-universe information
- Occupation: Surgeon
- Husband: Jim Mason (until 2010)
- Nieces: Amy Mason

Dr. Jennifer Mason was new surgeon hired by Chris Warner (Michael Galvin) who caused friction between him and Rachel McKenna (Angela Bloomfield). Jennifer's emotional instability was witnessed when a young patient died and she kissed student, Hunter McKay (Lee Donoghue) and it was revealed Jennifer's niece had died under her surveillance. Jennifer started to date TK Samuels (Benjamin Mitchell) but discovered he still loved his ex-wife. In December Jennifer was shocked to learn Maia Jeffries (Anna Jullienne) had a crush on her and began to reevaluate her own feelings. In January 2011 the two gave in and began an affair whilst Maia was in a relationship. Jennifer soon realised she was in the wrong and after being confronted in public by Maia's girlfriend Nicole (Sally Martin) and being teased by Isaac (Matt Minto), Jennifer broke up with Maia and fled Ferndale.

== Leo Hofstetter ==
Leo Hofstetter
- Shortland Street character
- Portrayed by: Matthew Cousins
- Duration: 2010
- First appearance: 22 September 2010
- Last appearance: 5 October 2010
- Introduced by: Steven Zanoski

Leo Hofstetter was the conman who successfully stole thousands of dollars of the hospital's money. At first appearing professional and polite, Gerald (Harry McNaughton) was the first to see Leo's true colours and it was not long before all staff were suspicious of Leo. In October he escaped with thousands of dollars and miraculously escaped capture.

== Cecile Worthington ==
Cecile Worthington
- Shortland Street character
- Portrayed by: Jane Thomas
- Duration: 2010, 2011
- First appearance: 6 October 2010
- Last appearance: 29 March 2011
- Introduced by: Steven Zanoski (2010, 2011)
In-universe information
- Husband: Desmond Worthington
- Sons: Isaac Worthington
- Adoptive sons: Joseph Worthington
- Nephews: Chris Warner; Guy Warner
- Nieces: Amanda Warner

Cecile Worthington (née Cartier) was the hugely rich mother of Isaac (Matt Minto). Cecile arrived to inform Isaac that she and her husband Desmond had adopted a child named Joseph. She was delighted to meet Isaac's girlfriend Brooke (Beth Allen) but was disgusted when she learned Brooke was the daughter of Grant Marsden (Alan Lovell). Cecile soon realised Isaac was abusing his trust fund and locked it. She returned months later to visit her brother-in-law Garth (Graeme Moran) and gave Isaac access to his fund. However, when her nephew Chris (Michael Galvin) informed Cecile of Isaac's law breaking, she once again locked the fund, leaving Isaac alone and penniless.

== Shane Tucker ==
Shane Tucker
- Shortland Street character
- Portrayed by: Jason Hood
- Duration: 2010, 2011, 2012
- First appearance: 18 October 2010
- Last appearance: 12 October 2012
- Introduced by: Steven Zanoski (2010, 2011, 2012)
In-universe information
- Occupation: Chief Executive Officer of Shortland Street Hospital (2011)
- Nieces: Paige Munroe

Shane Tucker made his first appearance in October 2010. He was the manipulative business man and auditor of the hospital under the eyes of the DHB. Shane arrived in October 2010 to investigate Leo Hofstetter's (Matthew Cousins) fraud of the hospital. Although at first impressed by the CEO Callum McKay (Peter Mochrie), Shane was disgusted to see Callum drunk at a party after being set up by Brooke Freeman (Beth Allen). Shane returned in 2011 alongside his niece Paige Munroe (Rachel Foreman), who he had raised as his daughter. Shane quickly set Callum up for wrongful dismissal and took his position as CEO. Shane claimed Daniel Potts' (Ido Drent) outstanding website design as hospital property and when he was sabotaged by Daniel in response, he angrily assaulted Daniel in public, leading to his resignation. However Shane returned but was quickly fired when he supplied his niece with drugs to cover up her drug addiction withdrawals. He returned a year later and offered Paige an internship in a top American college. Paige turned him down and he angrily disowned her.

== Murray Cooper ==
Murray Cooper
- Shortland Street character
- Portrayed by: Matthew Chamberlain
- Duration: 2010—2016, 2026-
- First appearance: 22 October 2010
- Introduced by: Steven Zanoski
In-universe information
- Occupation: Co-Owner of The I.V. Bar (2010–11, 2014–16); Owner of The I.V. Bar (2011–14); Truck driver (2010)
- Father: Len Cooper
- Mother: Judy Cooper
- Wife: Wendy Cooper (1989—2016
- Sons: Evan Cooper
- Daughters: Bella Cooper; Jasmine Cooper
- Granddaughters: Stevie Isaac
- Grandmothers: Rona Cooper

Murray James Cooper first appeared in late 2010 as part of the Cooper family unit. In August 2015 the character was axed, and the character made his final appearance in February 2016. Murray was the ever-absent husband of Wendy (Jacqueline Nairn) who finally arrived in October 2010. He instantly took a dislike to daughter Bella's (Amelia Reid) boyfriend - Brodie (Ari Boyland). Soon after his arrival, Murray purchased 'The IV' bar with Brodie, which forced the family to make cutbacks, resulting in a feud between Murray and his son Evan (Tyler Read). Murray and Wendy's marriage was on the rocks when Murray shared a kiss with Vasa (Teuila Blakely) but the two reconciled and Murray ended up buying Brodie's share of the bar. In May 2012 Murray fell in love with Cat Gibson (Roz Gibson) and ended up leaving Wendy and the children. However the affair was short lived and in December Murray and Wendy reconciled only for Murray to narrowly avoid death after being run down by a car. After Wendy terminated her pregnancy in mid 2013, the relationship was again on the rocks but the two reconciled after fostering both Dayna (Lucy Elliott) and Kane Jenkins (KJ Apa). Tragedy struck in late 2015 when both Murray's father Len (Bruce Phillips) and Wendy were killed in a shooting at the hospital. After months of grieving, Murray decided to leave Ferndale to sail around the world and deal with the grief.

== Rafe Durville ==
Rafe Durville
- Shortland Street character
- Portrayed by: Simon London
- Duration: 2010
- First appearance: 5 November 2010
- Last appearance: 7 December 2010
- Introduced by: Steven Zanoski
In-universe information
- Occupation: Adventurer; Author
- Brothers: Luke Durville
- Nephews: Luca Dobra

Rafael "Rafe" Durville was the younger brother of Luke Durville (Gerald Urquhart) and a famous adventurer. He arrived to the hospital after crashing a hot air balloon and the staff were shocked to discover the adventurous Rafe was related to the eccentric Luke. Rafe soon developed a crush on Tania Jeffries (Faye Smythe) but realised Luke was in love with her and so backed off. However the chemistry between the two was too strong to ignore and they got together, offending Luke. However he soon forgave them and the couple departed overseas to set up a clinic. Rafe phoned in 2011 to inform Luke he and Tania would not be attending Luke's wedding with Zlata. In 2013, Luke's widow Bella (Amelia Reid), visited Rafe in Laos to consider donating Luke's fortune to his clinic.

== Hine Ryan ==
Hine Ryan
- Shortland Street character
- Portrayed by: Rena Owen
- Duration: 2010–11
- First appearance: 26 November 2010
- Last appearance: 15 February 2011
- Introduced by: Steven Zanoski
In-universe information
- Other names: Hine Rangiuia (maiden name); Hine Scott (married name)
- Occupation: Social Worker
- Husband: Jimmy Scott (until 1990)
- Sons: James Scott; Patrick Scott
- Daughters: Rebecca Scott
- Grandsons: Jessie Scott; Kitu Scott (adpoptive)
- Granddaughters: Amy Scott

Hine Ryan (née Rangiuia, previously Scott) was the formerly drug addicted mother of Scotty (Kiel McNaughton), who abandoned him when he was aged 13. Scotty located his mother in 2010 and hesitantly welcomed her back into his life for his marriage to Tracey (Sarah Thomson). Hine landed a job at the hospital but proved controversial when she covered up a man who smuggled heroin into the hospital and helped an illegal immigrant escape. She started to clash with Tracey over the organisation of the wedding and insisted Scotty leave her. Hine bonded with Tracey when it was discovered Scotty had a brain tumour and she ended up leaving to reconcile with her daughter, Rebecca (Marise Wipani) in Wellington. She briefly returned to attend Scotty's wedding.

== Jim Mason ==
Jim Mason
- Shortland Street character
- Portrayed by: Kevin Keyes
- Duration: 2010–11
- First appearance: 8 December 2010
- Last appearance: 1 February 2011
- Introduced by: Steven Zanoski
In-universe information
- Occupation: Surgeon
- Husband: Jennifer Mason (until 2010)
- Nieces: Amy Mason

Dr. Jim Mason was the arrogant ex-husband of Jennifer (Sara Wiseman). He arrived in December and quickly tried to win Jennifer back. He failed and confessed to his friend Isaac (Matt Minto) that he was in deep with Russian gangs over illegal operations. Isaac ended up becoming involved and when Luke Durville (Gerald Urquhart) started prying, Jim was beaten up. Jim later fled New Zealand and expressed disgust at Jennifer's new found sexuality.

== Others ==
Date(s)	Character	Actor(s)	Circumstances
3 February 2010	Philip Fitzpatrick	Jeremy King	Philip was the younger brother of Loren. Loren's boyfriend Daniel Potts was sceptical of Loren's belief against immunizations but was shocked to meet Philip whilst at Loren's house. Philip was autistic and developed the illness following an immunization
27–30 April 2010	Grandma Miller "B"	Dianne Lamont	Grandma Miller (referred to sometimes as B) was the very sick grandmother of Nicole, the mother of her father William. Despite knowing 4 languages in her youth, several strokes had seen her bed ridden at the Miller family house in Tauranga, relying on Nicole to nurse her. By 2014, B was no longer living with the Millers.
