= List of Shortland Street characters introduced in 2013 =

The following is a list of characters that first appeared in the New Zealand soap opera Shortland Street in 2013, by order of first appearance.

== Roman Sylvester ==
Roman Sylvester
- Shortland Street character
- Portrayed by: Charles Pierard
- Duration: 2013–2014
- First appearance: 14 January 2013
- Last appearance: 4 February 2014
- Introduced by: Steven Zanoski (2013); Simon Bennett (2013, 2014)
In-universe information
- Occupation: Detective

D.I Roman Sylvester appeared in several recurring stints from early 2013.

Roman was the detective assigned to Roimata Samuels' (Shavaughn Ruakere) assault case. He later worked alongside Josh Gallagher (Chris Tempest) when drug dealers carried out a heist on the hospital. In early 2014 Ramon returned when he investigated the murder of Travis Corfrield (John Tui).

== Dayna Jenkins ==
Dayna Jenkins
- Shortland Street character
- Portrayed by: Lucy Elliott
- Duration: 2013–2016
- First appearance: 28 March 2013
- Last appearance: 3 June 2016
- Introduced by: Simon Bennett
In-universe information
- Occupation: Bartender; Businesswoman
- Father: Jimmy Isaac
- Mother: Jennifer Jenkins
- Brothers: Kane Jenkins
- Half-sisters: Stevie Isaac
- Husband: George Kirkwood (2015–)

Dayna Kirkwood (also Jenkins) first appeared in March 2013, portrayed by Lucy Elliott. To mark the show's 21st anniversary, 4 new young characters were introduced, with Dayna debuting alongside Harper Whitley (Ria Vandervis), Dallas Adams (Cameron Jones) and returning character, Henry Lee (Peter Huang). Elliot is one of a number of second-generation Shortland Street actors; her father Peter played clinic CEO David Kearney in the late 1990s.

Jasmine Cooper (Pearl McGlashan) was saved by Dayna at a dodgy gang party and the two soon became best friends. However Dayna's dangerous and naughty behaviour soon lead Jasmine to behave in a similar manner, much to the shock of her mother Wendy (Jacqueline Nairn). Dayna started to live with the Coopers but it soon became clear she was seriously troubled and was hospitalised in July after being diagnosed as mentally unstable (has bipolar disorder), before leaving for a psychiatric unit. Dayna returned in December when her mother Jennifer was declared brain dead following a car crash. After Jennifer died, Dayna and her brother Kane (KJ Apa) moved in with the Cooper's and she began a relationship with Evan (Tyler Read). Danya began helping Murray Cooper, working at The IV after it burned down while she and Evan broke up after Evan decided to leave to go overseas in August 2014. In 2015 she begin to date bad boy Curtis Hannah and also it was revealed that she is the daughter of Jimmy Isaac after taking a DNA Test. Dayna found a new romance in new British doctor George Kirkwood. After months of dating, George proposed to Dayna, but George went back to the United Kingdom for a family wedding, and didn't contact Dayna, much to Dayna's anguish. When George returned, they settled their differences and was married on the final episode of 2015, when the original wedding between Boyd Rolleston and Harper Whitley was postpone due to and unbeknownst situation to Dayna and George where Gareth Hutchins was holding hostages at Shortland Street. George admits to Dayna that he is not a real doctor, having failed his final exam and using forged documentation. In order to protect George, Dayna helps George lie on the understanding George quits being a doctor. Dayna and George decide to leave Ferndale, despite being found out by Lucy Rickman. After an emotional goodbye, Lucy let her best friend go without being caught, and Dayna and George fled Ferndale.

== Luca Dobra ==
Luca Dobra
- Shortland Street character
- Portrayed by: Charlie Truman
- First appearance: 19 April 2013
- Last appearance: 3 June 2013
- Introduced by: Simon Bennett
In-universe information
- Father: Luke Durville
- Mother: Zlata Dobra
- Grandfathers: Costel Waldheim
- Grandmothers: Stella Waldheim
- Uncles: Rafe Durville
- Aunts: Edina Waldheim

Alexandru "Luca" Dobra first appeared in April 2013 portrayed by Charlie Truman.

He arrived with his mother Zlata (Kate Elliott) with the news that he was the newborn son of the recently deceased Luke Durville (Gerald Urquhart). Zlata started to neglect Luca and Murray Cooper and Wendy Cooper were left to look after the baby. After Luca bonded with Luke's widow, Bella (Amelia Reid), Zlata eventually took him back to Romania to become a single parent.

== Harper Whitley ==
Harper McCaskill (also Whitley) is a fictional character on the New Zealand soap opera Shortland Street portrayed by Ria Vandervis. She made her first screen appearance on the episode broadcast on 1 May 2013.

== Susan Rolleston ==
Susan Rolleston
- Shortland Street character
- Portrayed by: Miranda Harcourt
- Duration: 2013, 2015, 2020
- First appearance: 6 May 2013
- Last appearance: 21 August 2020
- Introduced by: Simon Bennett (2013, 2015); Maxine Fleming & Oliver Driver (2020)
In-universe information
- Husband: Alisdair Rolleston
- Sons: Alisdair Rolleston; Boyd Rolleston
- Daughters: Mallory Rolleston
- Grandsons: Romulus Rolleston; Remus Rolleston
- Granddaughters: Shereez Baker; Raya Chakraborty

Susan Rolleston nee Kearney first appeared in May 2013. Boyd Rolleston (Sam Bunkall) visited his mother Susan and father Alisdair Rolleston (Peter Hambleton) in their South Island family farm to commemorate the anniversary of his grandfather's death. Intensely anti-Auckland and with strongly rural beliefs, they were adamantly opposed to his girlfriend Brooke Freeman (Beth Allen) and Boyd's life in the North Island; wanting him to take over the family farm. Susan attempted to separate the couple by encouraging Boyd's childhood friend to pursue him but were shocked when Boyd announced his marriage to Brooke. Upon his return to Ferndale, Boyd learned his family had disowned him from the family trust fund. Susan arrived to Ferndale in 2015 for Boyd's wedding to Harper Whitley (Ria Vandervis).

In 2020, Susan returned again for Boyd's marriage to Zara Mandal with her new partner, David Kearney, a Shortland Street doctor from the 1990s.

== Dallas Adams ==
Dallas Adams
- Shortland Street character
- Portrayed by: Cameron Jones
- Duration: 2013–2015
- First appearance: 13 May 2013
- Last appearance: 27 February 2015
- Introduced by: Simon Bennett
In-universe information
- Occupation: Paramedic
- Father: Colin Adams
- Mother: Elaine Adams
- Brothers: Todd Adams

Dallas Adams first appeared in May 2013, portrayed by one-time New Zealand's Got Talent star, Cameron Jones. Dallas was described as, adventurous, likeable and "the guy that everyone invites to the party."

Dallas treated Ula's (Frankie Adams) course leader during his paramedic duties and later rescued a drunk and lost Dayna Jenkins (Lucy Elliott). He quickly got a job at Shortland Street and began to date Emma Franklin (Amy Usherwood) but the couple broke up when he kissed her best friend Kylie (Kerry-Lee Dewing). Several months later Dallas began to date Bella Durville (Amelia Reid-Meredith) and in mid 2014, the two became engaged. However Bella got cold feet and Dallas rebounded to a one-night stand with Ula. Dallas ultimately ended up falling in love with Ula and after finally dispelling the guilt of his brothers death by selling the family farm, Dallas and Ula departed for paramedic jobs in London.

== Len Cooper ==
Len Cooper
- Shortland Street character
- Portrayed by: Bruce Phillips
- Duration: 2013, 2015–2016
- First appearance: 16 July 2013
- Last appearance: 18 January 2016
- Introduced by: Simon Bennett (2013, 2015)
In-universe information
- Mother: Rona Cooper
- Wife: Judy Cooper (1968–2015)
- Sons: Murray Cooper
- Grandsons: Evan Cooper
- Granddaughters: Bella Durville; Jasmine Cooper

Len Cooper made his first appearance in July 2013. With the episode airing in September 2013 that saw Len attempt to kill himself proved highly controversial and saw concern from suicide networks who believed those sensitive to the topic should have been warned prior to its airing. A Television New Zealand spokesperson responded, "Shortland Street has a long history of dealing with topical and sensitive issues. It does so with a strong sense of social responsibility, presenting a range of perspectives that reflect the different real life experiences of New Zealanders."

Murray (Matthew Chamberlain) was shocked when his father Len showed up unannounced and revealed his wife had kicked him out. Len began staying with the Cooper's but shocked all when he mistook his granddaughter Jasmine (Pearl McGlashan) for a past lover and tried to kiss her. Len was subsequently diagnosed with the beginnings of dementia. As a result, Murray promised to put his long running rift with his father I him. After reconciling with Judy, Len decided to stay in Auckland but requested for his son to euthanise him. Murray declined, resulting in Len attempting to commit suicide by overdose. Len eventually came to accept the love of his family and moved into residential care. Two years later Len was admitted to Shortland Street after a fall and when Murray took him for a fish on his boat, he realised how bad a state his father's health was in. Murray decided to take Len back to care when Bella got pregnant with Stevie, thus making him a great-grandfather. After Stevie was born, Len kept on forgetting Stevie was a girl. He later mentioned about a man called Ross, which may be a half-brother of Murray that he never knew. Len suffered a broken shoulder and needed surgery, but then confronted Gareth Hutchins, who held Shortland Street and IV Cafe hostage. Len was shot point blank in the stomach, and having lost so much blood from delayed care, he died.

== Toby Reynolds ==
Toby Reynolds
- Shortland Street character
- Portrayed by: Robert Evison
- Duration: 2013–2014
- First appearance: 2 August 2013
- Last appearance: 5 November 2014
- Introduced by: Simon Bennett
In-universe information
- Father: Brett Franklin
- Mother: Julia Reynolds
- Half-sisters: Emma Franklin
- Grandmothers: Norelle Brown
- Aunts: Kylie Brown

Toby Reynolds was first mentioned in December 2012, before arriving in August 2013 portrayed by Robert Evison.

Toby was the result of an affair between Kylie Brown's (Kerry-Lee Dewing) sister, Julia (Jessica Joy Wood) and Emma Franklin's (Amy Usherwood) father, Brett (Matt Dwyer). Kylie and Emma were not aware of Toby's existence and presumed Julia had died whilst pregnant in 1998. In 2012 they located Julia and learned that she had been bringing Toby up in a cult. The following year, Toby arrived at their doorstep and began to live with the girls. Toby developed a crush on his best friend Kane's (KJ Apa) girlfriend Honour Aleni (Sophie McIntosh) and successfully broke them up. When Brett arrived into Toby's life, he struggled emotionally and struck out, crashing Dallas' (Cameron Jones) car off a cliff. Brett turned out overbearing in raising Toby and faked an assault on Honour to draw his son closer to him. When Toby discovered this, alongside a near attack on Kane, he murdered Brett with a spade and set about covering up the crime as a suicide. Toby evaded police for weeks but eventually confessed and was prisoned. In late July, he was sent down to Christchurch to await sentencing, closer to his mother. Toby returned in November for his trial and warned that he and Kane would be certain to get prison time. However Toby was cleared and returned to Christchurch.

== Judy Cooper ==
Judy Cooper
- Shortland Street character
- Portrayed by: Donna Akersten
- First appearance: 2 September 2013
- Last appearance: 7 October 2013
- Introduced by: Simon Bennett
In-universe information
- Husband: Len Cooper (1968–2015)
- Sons: Murray Cooper
- Grandsons: Evan Cooper
- Granddaughters: Bella Durville; Jasmine Cooper

Judy Cooper made her first appearance in early September.

Murray's (Matthew Chamberlain) father Len (Bruce Phillips) arrived and announced Judy had kicked him out. However it soon was revealed he had the beginnings of dementia. When Len returned home to Nelson in September, Judy encouraged him to enter a home but to no success. She later visited Len when he decided to live in Auckland.

== Nate Clark ==
Nate Clark
- Shortland Street character
- Portrayed by: Josh McKenzie
- Duration: 2013–2014
- First appearance: 19 September 2013
- Last appearance: 26 March 2014
- Introduced by: Simon Bennett
In-universe information
- Occupation: Executive Assistant
- Mother: Donna Clark

Nate Clark first appeared in early October portrayed by Josh McKenzie.

Nate was hired as the hospitals Executive Assistant under Chris Warner (Michael Galvin) but following his replacement by Grace Kwan (Lynette Forday), Nate struggled to balance his hunger for power and arrogance. He was vastly rich and powerful, simply due to his family business and trust fund. He began to date Kylie Brown (Kerry-Lee Dewing) but his vindictive nature soon became apparent when he purposefully made Grace slip down some stairs. Grace demoted Nate much to his successful mother Donna's (Dra McKay) dismay. After being conned by Travis Corfield (John Tui), Nate became the primary suspect in his murder but was later proved innocent. Nate was soon disowned by his mother after one too many shames and in an attempt for success and money, he stole Boyd Rolleston's (Sam Bunkall) invention patent. All turned against Nate except for Chris and he eventually secured him a job overseas that resulted in Kylie and Nate breaking up.

== Travis Corfield ==
Travis Corfield
- Shortland Street character
- Portrayed by: John Tui
- First appearance: 15 October 2013
- Last appearance: 11 December 2013
- Introduced by: Simon Bennett

Travis Corfield first appeared in October 2013 and was portrayed by John Tui.

In July 2010 Ula Levi (Frankie Adams) arrived at Maxwell Avia's (Robbie Magasiva) house in Auckland after having escaped her mother Vasa (Teuila Blakely) and her abusive boyfriend Travis in Wellington. Vasa broke it off from Travis in August and moved to Ferndale. In 2013 Travis arrived in Ferndale on a business trip and used the opportunity to meet up with Vasa after contacting her through online dating. After a rocky start, the two eventually reconciled and Vasa, Vinnie (Pua Magasiva) and Murray (Matthew Chamberlain), all invested in Travis' company. Vasa and Travis became engaged but it turned out he was in serious financial issues and when Travis angrily grabbed Vasa and later Ula, the couple broke up; with the two in thousands of dollars of debt. Vasa stole money from Travis to pay back the investors and a few days later, Travis mysteriously showed up dead in her apartment carpark. Brooke Freeman (Beth Allen) later discovered her sister Bree Hamilton (Rachael Blampied) had killed Travis after discovering his money.

== Jennifer Jenkins ==
Jennifer Jenkins
- Shortland Street character
- First appearance: 5 December 2013
- Last appearance: 11 December 2013
- Introduced by: Simon Bennett
In-universe information
- Sons: Kane Jenkins
- Daughters: Dayna Jenkins

Jennifer Jenkins appeared for multiple episodes in December 2013, portrayed by an uncredited actress.

Dayna Jenkins (Lucy Elliott) would constantly argue with her mother during phone calls and it soon became apparent to Wendy Cooper (Jacqueline Nairn) that Jennifer was a neglectful mother. She picked up Dayna in May when she suffered a massive mental breakdown. Wendy was shocked to be reunited with Dayna in December and it turned out Jennifer had been in a car crash and was in a coma. Josh Gallagher (Chris Tempest) injected the unconscious Jennifer with sedative that would ensure she would not awake so that he could use her kidney as a transplant for Brooke Freeman (Beth Allen). She was declared brain dead and despite initial hesitation by Dayna, her life support machine was turned off and her kidney donated to Brooke. The following year, Dayna and Kane (KJ Apa) received a million dollars in inheritance.

== Kane Jenkins ==
Kane Jenkins first appeared in December 2013 portrayed by KJ Apa. The character was introduced as part of the extended Cooper family unit and as a means to depict youth-suicide.

== Others ==
| Date(s) | Character | Actor(s) | Circumstances |
|---|---|---|---|
| 6 May 2013 – 9 May 2013 | Mallory Rolleston | Ascia Maybury | Mallory was the younger sister of Boyd Rolleston (Sam Bunkall) who was dedicated to running the family farm but looked over due to her gender. Supportive of Boyd's life in Auckland, she was given responsibility of managing the farm when Boyd married Brooke Freeman (Beth Allen) to purposefully disown his family. |
| 6 May 2013 – 9 May 2013 | Alisdair Rolleston | Peter Hambleton | Alisdair was the overbearing conservative father of Boyd Rolleston (Sam Bunkall). Sternly against the life of medicine he was pursuing, Alisdair hoped for Boyd to return and manage the family farm in the South Island. Upon learning of Boyd's marriage to Brooke Freeman (Beth Allen) against his wishes, he disowned his son and removed him from the family trust. In 2015 Alisdair had a heart attack, preventing him from attending Boyd's wedding to Harper Whitley (Ria Vandervis). In 2020 he rang Boyd to announce his separation from his wife. |
