= Bella Cooper =

- Shortland Street character
- Portrayed by: Amelia Reid-Meredith
- Duration: 2010–16, 2019
- First appearance: 8 September 2010
- Last appearance: 16 December 2019
- Introduced by: Steven Zanoski (2010); Maxine Fleimng (2019)
In-universe information
- Occupation: Personal Assistant; Receptionist
- Father: Murray Cooper
- Mother: Wendy Cooper
- Brothers: Evan Cooper
- Sisters: Jasmine Cooper
- Husband: Luke Durville (2012–2013)
- Daughters: Stevie Isaac
- Grandfathers: Alistair; Len Cooper
- Grandmothers: Judy Cooper

Isabella Jane "Bella" Durville (also Cooper) is a fictional character on the New Zealand soap opera Shortland Street who was portrayed by Amelia Reid-Meredith (Note: Reid-Meredith was credited under her maiden name, Amelia Reid, from 2010 to 2012) between her arrival in September 2010 and her departure in November 2016. She was the eldest sibling in the Cooper family unit.

== Creation and casting ==
In June 2010, Jacqueline Nairn joined the cast of Shortland Street as red headed nurse, Wendy Cooper. After several months on screen, it was announced that Wendy's family would be introduced throughout the remainder of the year. Nairn was excited by the prospect and stated, "The actors who are playing my children are awesome. We are having a lot of fun connecting and I think viewers are really going to enjoy learning about the Coopers over the next little while." Nairn was said to look forward as to how the Cooper's would "weave" into Ferndale and promised they would "rock the boat." Amelia Reid was a recent graduate from Toi Whakaari drama school, when she auditioned for the role of Penny Rourke on the soap, and though she missed out on the role, she was later hired to play the part of the eldest child in the Cooper family, Bella Cooper. Reid was delighted to win the role and stated, "I'm loving my time on Shortland Street so far. My first day on set was terrifying, exhilarating and wonderful all in one. I feel extremely blessed to be a full-time actor, being paid to play make believe." She compared her character to the iconic and long running former receptionists, Marj Brasch (Elizabeth McRae) and Waverley Harrison (Claire Chitham). After Reid-Meredith fell pregnant in late 2014, producers incorporated the pregnancy into the storyline. In mid 2016, Reid-Meredith decided to take "a break and pursue other projects and opportunities" and quit the show. Producer Maxine Fleming ensured the exit storyline would be "kept under wraps" but Reid-Meredith remained optimistic about a potential return to the show, "sometimes you just have to follow your heart and do what you feel is right at the time, and I definitely won't say I will never be back!" Bella departed on 7 November 2016. Reid-Meredith reprised her role for a guest stint in December 2019.

== Storylines ==
Bella arrived to the hospital when it was revealed she had been dropped from her prestigious beauty course for burning a man's face. She quickly gained the job of receptionist and developed an intense crush on Brodie Kemp (Ari Boyland). The two soon started to date and after initially clashing with co worker Yvonne Jeffries (Alison Quigan), she and Bella became good friends. Bella and Brodie broke up and she became briefly engaged to manipulative doctor Isaac Worthington (Matt Minto) before she and Brodie reunited. The couple planned to flee New Zealand to escape some criminals after Brodie but he left her behind and she turned her attentions to an unrequited crush on Daniel Potts (Ido Drent). However, as the year ended, Bella discovered she had fallen in love with Luke Durville (Gerald Urquhart) and narrowly survived a murder attempt by his ex-fiancėe's father, Costel (Phil Peloton). Bella and Luke got together and after she saved a young boys life, she briefly decided to become a doctor. The couple got engaged but Bella was devastated when Luke was diagnosed with a vicious brain tumour the night before the wedding. Nonetheless, the two got married.

Following Luke's death, Bella inherited a small fortune but was shocked to discover Luke had accidentally fathered a child, Luca Dobra (Charlie Truman). She gave much of her money to Luca and began to date Josh Gallagher (Chris Tempest). It soon turned out Josh was seriously mentally ill and Bella broke up with him, only for Josh to die in an explosion he set off at the staff Christmas function. Bella moved in with Emma (Amy Usherwood) and Kylie (Kerry-Lee Dewing), began to date Dallas Adams (Cameron Jones). The two got engaged but Bella decided she had not properly grieved for Luke enough to get married again and the two broke up. Bella started to date her foster brother Kane's (KJ Apa) father Jimmy (Joel Tobeck) and fell pregnant. The couple got engaged but ultimately separated before Bella gave birth to a girl, Stevie. Stevie proved to have medical problems and was helped through it by surgeon Boyd Rolleston (Sam Bunkall), making Bella realise she had fallen in love with him. Following the devastating death of Bella's mother Wendy (Jacqueline Nairn), Bella and Boyd finally committed to a relationship. The relationship proved successful but after many months came under strain due to the data-based Boyd became frustrated with Bella's belief in the supernatural. Realising the two were too different, they separated and Bella found herself drawn to temporary CEO Rajiv Prasad (Mel Odedra) whom shared her feelings of grief from Wendy's death, as he had lost his young daughter years beforehand. After Bella accidentally lost Stevie briefly, Rajiv helped her realise the importance of her child's safety and she decided to leave Ferndale to be closer to Jimmy in Raglan.

In late 2019 Boyd was shocked when Bella revealed herself as the Managing Director of a spiritual healing company selling sessions to Shortland Street patients. Reconnecting over their different perspectives of science, the two reconciled and Boyd happily became a father figure to Stevie. However Bella quickly realised Boyd was truly in love with Zara Mandal (Nivi Summer). She departed as the year ended, offering Boyd an ultimatum between the two women. Boyd's best friend Drew McCaskill (Ben Barrington) later informed Bella over the phone that Boyd had chosen Zara.

== Character development ==
=== Characterisation ===
In describing Bella, Reid stated, "Bella's vivacious, fun and has a kind heart. Sometimes though, her eagerness to relate to people means she rubs them up the wrong way. Bella's personality brings life to the room," She hoped they shared little characteristics, "I hope I'm not too much like Bella, she has a heart of gold though," but admitted to several, "We both suffer foot-in-mouth disease. We are both partial to wearing too many things at once, and we both love people." One reviewer referred to Bella as, "ditzy, but warmhearted." Hugh Sundae of The New Zealand Herald, compared Bella to past character, Gina Rossi-Dodds (Josephine Davison), stating that Bella was, "Forever alternating between dropping clangers and joining the dots. It's like Gina (remember her?) got taller and dyed her hair. And started joining dots."

=== Relationship with Luke Durville ===
In 2011 oddball anaesthetist, Luke Durville (Gerald Urquhart) returned to the show with a fiancé, Zlata Waldheim (Kate Elliott). The staff soon realised that Zlata was manipulating Luke to drastically change him as a person, none more so than Luke's best friend, Bella. Bella soon realised she was in love with Luke and was disorientated when Zlata placed her at the centre of the wedding organisation. Luke soon realised he too was in love with Bella and put an end to his and Zlata's engagement. In 2012 through the manipulation of Brooke Freeman (Beth Allen), the two separated, but quickly reconciled. When Bella began to tire of her lifestyle, Luke decided to get her involved in art with Urquhart stating, "Luke feels genuinely concerned when Bella is worried her life isn't exciting enough. He likes to see her happy and is determined to cheer her up ... Luke is over the moon when he thinks he has the answer to Bella's problems. Art is also a love that they share and can bond over." The couple got engaged and Bella soon became a "bridezilla". Bella ended up winning a competition that would see their wedding paid for, Reid explained, "She was very excited about it. Luke, not so much – the idea of having to have photographs and making it so public. He's definitely pleasing her and going along with this big dream fairytale wedding. He'd much prefer, I think, to just have family and a quiet ceremony but she's planning this wedding since she was about 5 years old so she's going a bit crazy." Urquhart agreed, stating that Luke's perfect wedding, "would have some kind of ritual from somewhere but the main focus for Luke would be that he and his bride were there and he'd be happy .... he deals with her as he always has – with love and servitude."

On the night prior to the wedding, Luke was diagnosed with Glioblastoma multiforme and emotionally admitted to Bella she should reconsider marrying a dying man. Nonetheless, Bella decided to carry on with the nuptials and the two married in December 2012. The wedding march used for the episode was the same as the music used for the 1981 wedding between Charles, Prince of Wales and Diana, Princess of Wales. Although happily married, Bella struggled to accept Luke's diagnosis and suggested she have his child to keep his legacy alive. Luke was hesitant to accept the offer and instead, the couple threw a "living wake", a party themed around that of a wake set to celebrate Luke's life. Reid elaborated on Bella's desire to have the party, "Bella thinks this is a perfect opportunity for people to show their appreciation of Luke and his life. But she wants to keep it as cheerful as possible." As such she struggled with the theme of death. Several months after Luke's death, Zala returned to Ferndale with a baby, Luke's apparent son, Luca Dobra (Charlie Truman). Bella embraced Luca, with Reid explaining, "she realises that Luca is definitely Luke's baby, it really hits her hard. But it doesn't take her long to realise that having Luca around is like having a little piece of Luke in her life and she embraces being part of his upbringing."

== Reception ==
Hugh Sundae of The New Zealand Herald praised Reid's portrayal of Bella, stating; "Amelia Reid (as Bella Cooper) wasn't firing at 100 percent in her first week either, but now she's one of The Street's best new characters". Michael Galvin (Chris Warner) named Bella as one of his favourite characters and commented that Reid played her "to perfection".

== Relations to future characters ==
Shadon Meredith, husband of Amelia, played as HIV-carrier Matiu, and a homosexual love interest to Jack Hannah in 2019.
