= Wendy Cooper =

- Shortland Street character
- Portrayed by: Jacqueline Nairn
- Duration: 2010–2016
- First appearance: 4 June 2010
- Last appearance: 19 January 2016
- Introduced by: Steven Zanoski
In-universe information
- Occupation: Nurse
- Father: Alistair
- Husband: Murray Cooper (1989–2016)
- Sons: Evan Cooper
- Daughters: Bella Cooper; Jasmine Cooper
- Granddaughters: Stevie Isaac

Wendy Cooper is a fictional character on the New Zealand soap opera Shortland Street and has been portrayed by Jacqueline Nairn since her debut in mid-2010. The character arrived as the matriarch of the new family unit, the Coopers.

== Creation and casting ==
Nairn had previously played a guest role in the early 2000s and after an audition in February 2010, won the role of Wendy Cooper. It was announced in May 2010 that Wendy was to arrive in June as part of Sarah's new clinic. It was later announced that Wendy's family would be introduced throughout the year as part of a new family unit. Nairn was excited but nervous about acting in the iconic soap, stating: "I was terrified! It was on location with Amanda (Sarah Potts). But fortunately, the first scene I shot was Wendy's job interview with Sarah, so my character was fairly nervous. Although I'm not sure how much of it was Wendy and how much of it was Jacquie!"

== Storylines ==
Wendy was hired by Sarah Potts (Amanda Billing) as a nurse at her new clinic but was accused of being a drug addict by doctor Reuben Fitzpatrick (David Aston) and ended up getting a job at Shortland Street Hospital. Wendy was forced to sell the petrol station she owned because of her financial crisis but ended up buying the local bar – The I.V. with her husband Murray (Matthew Chamberlain). However the marriage hit a rocky patch in early 2011 when Murray kissed Vasa Levi (Teuila Blakely). However the two reconciled and Wendy was diagnosed with Long QT, a condition she passed on to daughters Bella (Amelia Reid) and Jasmine (Pearl McGlashan). Wendy was shocked when Murray ended their marriage, having fallen in love with Cat Gibson (Roz Turnbull).

Wendy died when gunman Gareth Hutchins (Jarrod Martin) caused her to suffer a brain hemorrhage as a result of being shot by him, Gareth Hutchins. In the 2015 season finale, Hutchins invaded the hospital with weapons due to strained relations with CEO Rachel McKenna and surgeon Drew McCaskall. Hutchins shot Drew, leaving him for dead, then went to the cafe where he held a number of hostages. He shot Wendy's father-in-law Len Cooper dead. After a shoot-out with police, the 2016 season returned to find that Drew McCaskall was in critical condition and both Wendy and her husband, Murray, had been shot by Gareth Hutchins. Murray recovered quickly and was left in a sling. Wendy quickly deteriorated and was put on life support. In the second episode of the season, Murray made the call to turn off his wife's life support. The Coopers gathered in the ward to bid an emotional farewell to the mother hen of their family.

== Character development ==
=== Characterisation ===
The character has been described as an "underdog" and a representation of the common man. Her feisty attitude often sees Wendy fight for what she sees as mistreatment, mostly landing her in trouble. Nairn enjoyed the role stating; "Wendy likes to stand up for what she believes in, and supports those who do not have help elsewhere, and she's a total lioness when it comes to protecting and defending her children. Which means that she is more often than not, fighting some kind of battle on someone's behalf and forgetting to worry about herself."

=== The Coopers ===
In August 2010, it was announced that the rest of the Cooper family would be arriving on screen beside Wendy. Nairn was pleased with the family unit, saying; "Wendy's storylines have mainly been based around what goes on at work, so I'm really looking forward to exploring another aspect of her life. I'm also intrigued about how the Coopers will weave themselves into Ferndale and Shortland Street hospital." Nairn also enjoyed working with the actors, stating; "The actors who are playing my children are awesome. We are having a lot of fun connecting and I think viewers are really going to enjoy learning about the Coopers over the next little while." On describing the dynamics of the family, she thought they were a close knit family unit, stating; "My kids are just fantastic. They are wonderful young actors and we are having the best time creating the Cooper family. The Coopers are an incredibly close family. Wendy wants to have an open, honest relationship with her children, so they feel they can tell her everything, but as anyone with teenagers will know, parents can never know everything!" After producers saw an article on the high rate of infidelity and divorce in New Zealand and realised that a majority of the collapsed couples were seemingly happy, they decided it wasn't too far fetched to create a storyline where Wendy and Murray broke up. Head writer Kim Harrop explained, stating: "We started discussing this idea on the story table and were surprised to learn how many couples we knew who had recently broken up. These weren't the ones you'd predict either. Outwardly, they were happy families, like the Coopers. But what really struck us was that time and time again, the reason for the breakup stemmed largely from the male experiencing some sort of dissatisfaction with his lot or mid-life crisis. Talk drifted to the Cooper's relationship and we were uncomfortable to realise that, given their current circumstances, it wasn't entirely impossible their marriage could break down too." Television New Zealand approved the storyline but ensured that it would provide long term gain in the ratings and not become tiresome as it progressed. Matthew Chamberlain (Murray) was devastated when he learned of the storyline but realised it had potential and understood the reasoning behind it. On screen Murray ended up leaving Wendy for a motorbiker called Cat.

== Reception ==
The character alongside her family, received a frosty reception upon arrival, winning "Most Boring Storyline" in the Throng Shortland Street Fan Awards 2010. However, the characters diagnosis with Long QT Syndrome saw praise by families with the disease. Jacqueline Nairn received a nomination for "Best Actress" in the TV Guide Best on the Box Awards 2012. The separation of Wendy and Murray was said to have upset fans and have them "raging" but provided huge ratings for the network. Pua Magasiva (Vinnie Kruse) named Wendy as one of his favourite characters as he believed: "she's like everyone's mother hen."
