= Courtney Abbot =

New Zealand-born actress (born 1989)

- Born: 15 November 1989 (age 37); Whakatāne, New Zealand
- Occupation: Actress
- Years active: 2011-Present
- Height: 162 cm (5 ft 4 in)

Courtney Abbot (born 15 November 1989) is a New Zealand-born actress who is known for her lead role as Maxine on the New Zealand teen situation comedy Girl vs. Boy. Born in Whakatāne and a graduate of Unitec's School of Performing and Screen Arts, she has appeared in a number of film and theatre productions throughout New Zealand.

== Filmography ==
Film and television
Year	Title	Role	Notes
2010	Sleepless	Aurora	Short Film
2011	Experimental	Herself	Short Film
2011	Two Sisters and a Cousin	Margot	Short Film
2011	This is Libby	Libby	Short Film
2012	LoveDumb	Nicki Bricks	Short Film
2012 - 2014	Girl vs. Boy	Maxine	Series Lead
2012	Pirates of the Airwaves	Woman II	Telefeature
2013	Rot	Margot	Short Film
2013	Whisker	Shirl	Short Film
2014	What We Do in the Shadows	Student	Feature Film
