= Power Rangers S.P.D. =

American television series

- Genre: Action-adventure; Police procedural; Science fantasy; Superhero
- Based on: Tokusou Sentai Dekaranger by Toei Company
- Developed by: Jetix; The Walt Disney Company; Toei Company
- Showrunner: Bruce Kalish
- Directed by: Greg Aronowitz; Andrew Merrifield; Charlie Haskell; Mark Beesley; Britta Johnstone; Paul Grinder; John Laing
- Starring: See below
- Theme music composer: Ron Wasserman
- Composers: Bruce Lynch; Steven Vincent
- Countries of origin: United States; Japan
- Original language: English
- No. of episodes: 38

Production
- Executive producers: Bruce Kalish; Greg Aronowitz; Koichi Sakamoto
- Producers: Sally Campbell; Charles Knight
- Production locations: New Zealand (Auckland Region) (Auckland); Japan (Greater Tokyo Area) (Tokyo, Saitama, Yokohama) and Kyoto)
- Cinematography: Simon Riera
- Running time: 23 minutes
- Production companies: BVS Entertainment; Renaissance Atlantic Entertainment; Toei Company, Ltd. Ranger Productions, Ltd; Village Roadshow KP Productions Limited

Original release
- Network: ABC Family (Ep 1–22) (Jetix); Toon Disney (Ep 23–38) (Jetix)
- Release: February 5 – November 14, 2005

Related
- Power Rangers television series

Power Rangers S.P.D. is a television series and the thirteenth entry of the Power Rangers franchise, and is based on the 28th Super Sentai series Tokusou Sentai Dekaranger. The initials in the title stand for "Space Patrol Delta"; in Dekaranger, it stood for Special Police Dekaranger. The season debuted on February 5, 2005, as part of Jetix, originally airing on ABC Family; beginning with "Zapped", the series moved to Toon Disney.

A Japanese dub of S.P.D. started airing on Toei's digital television channel in Japan starting in August 2011, with two DVD volumes released on August 5. It features the original Dekaranger cast members dubbing over the voices of their American counterparts (with the exception of Mako Ishino, who is the series' narrator rather than voicing her character's counterpart).

== Plot ==
12 out of the 14 S.P.D. Rangers

By 2025, Earth has welcomed alien beings to live peacefully with humanity. While the majority do so, some become criminals, with the Space Patrol Delta (S.P.D.) law enforcement agency being formed to police them. After the Troobian Empire arrives to conquer Earth and S.P.D.'s A-Squad disappears while fighting them, their replacements on B-Squad - Sky Tate, Bridge Carson, and Sydney Drew - are forced to team up with two thieves - Jack Landors and Z Delgado - to defend the planet and stop the Troobians. Over time, B-Squad is joined by their commander, Doggie Cruger, and an S.P.D. officer from the future, Sam, in their efforts.

== Cast and characters ==
SPD Rangers

- Brandon Jay McLaren as Jack Landors, the S.P.D. Red Ranger.
- Chris Violette as Schuyler "Sky" Tate, the S.P.D. Blue Ranger.
- Matt Austin as Bridge Carson, the S.P.D. Green Ranger.
- Monica May as Elizabeth "Z" Delgado, the S.P.D. Yellow Ranger.
- Alycia Purrott as Sydney "Syd" Drew, the S.P.D. Pink Ranger.
- John Tui as Anubis "Doggie" Cruger, the S.P.D. Shadow Ranger.
- Brett Stewart as Sam, the S.P.D. Omega Ranger.
- Michelle Langstone as Dr. Katherine "Kat" Manx, the S.P.D. Kat Ranger.
- Antonia Prebble as Nova, the S.P.D. Nova Ranger.

Supporting characters

- Barnie Duncan as Piggy
- Kelson Henderson as Boom
- Beth Allen as Ally Samuels
- Tandi Wright as the voice of Isinia Cruger
- Paul Norell as Supreme Commander Fowler Birdie
- John Tui as Sergeant Silverback

Villains

- Rene Naufahu as Emperor Gruumm
- Olivia James-Baird as Mora
- Josephine Davison as Morgana
- Jim McLarty as the voice of Broodwing
- Derek Judge as the voice of Blue-Head Krybots
- James Gaylyn as the voice of Orange Head Krybots and Zeltrax
- Geoff Dolan as the voice of Omni The Magnificence

A-Squad

- Gina Varela as Charlie, A-Squad Red Ranger.
- Taran Howell as A-Squad Blue Ranger.
- Thomas Kiwi & Nick Kemplen (voice) as A-Squad Green Ranger.
- Allan Smith & Gregory Cooper II (voice) as A-Squad Yellow Ranger.
- Motoko Nagino & Claire Dougan (voice) as A-Squad Pink Ranger.

Guest Stars

- James Napier Robertson as Conner McKnight, the Red Dino Ranger and Triassic Ranger.
- Kevin Duhaney as Ethan James, the Blue Dino Ranger.
- Emma Lahana as Kira Ford, the Yellow Dino Ranger.
- Jeffrey Parazzo as Trent Fernandez, the White Dino Ranger and the voice of Dr. Tommy Oliver the Black Dino Ranger.
- James Gaylyn as the voice of Zeltrax

== Episodes ==
No.	Title	Directed by	Written by	Original release date
1	"Beginnings"	Greg Aronowitz	Bruce Kalish	February 5, 2005
2	"Beginnings"	Greg Aronowitz	Greg Aronowitz	February 5, 2005
Part 1: In the year 2025, Earth has become a sanctuary for aliens who have traversed space in search for a peaceful life. At the Space Patrol Delta Academy, Three experienced B-Squad cadets, Sky, Bridge, and Syd, are trusted with new S.P.D. morphers by Commander Cruger and Kat Manx. Soon, the new Rangers are assigned to bring in a pair of criminals, Jack and Z, who, just like them, possess genetic powers. Before they begin the capture, they are ambushed by a Blue Head robot sent by the planet-conquering Emperor Grumm, who is trying to open a portal to invade Earth. Part 2: Sky, Bridge and Syd morph into the Blue (much to Sky's dismay), Green and Pink Rangers, respectively, to take on the Blue Head's army of Krybots. When Jack and Z return to help, they are arrested and taken into custody, but are given a choice by Commander Cruger to join the team in lieu of prison time. After initial reluctance, they are recruited as the Red and Yellow Rangers, who help defeat the Blue Head.
3	"Confronted"	Greg Aronowitz	Jackie Marchand	February 12, 2005
The A-Squad is sent away on a mission in the Helix Nebula, leaving it up to the B-Squad Rangers to defend the Earth. However, Jack discovers the advantages of being the Red Ranger and begins to abuse his position heavily. Eventually, Jack's teammates call his leadership skills into question, and he is stripped of his Ranger powers by Cruger, but later gives them back when Jack learns a valuable lesson. Together, the B-Squad forms the Delta Squad Megazord using their Delta Squad Runner zords to capture the criminal Praxis.
4	"Walls"	Andrew Merrifield	John Tellegen	February 19, 2005
Still reeling from losing his chance at being the Red Ranger, Sky refuses to participate in group activities and argues with Jack over his leadership role. He almost loses his temper when Jack and Bridge are granted new Patrol Cycles. Meanwhile, Gruumm plans to steal diamonds to convert them into energy for a robot piloted by Ringbah. Jack orders Sky to watch over the diamonds, but refuses, allowing Grumm to get away with the diamonds. When Cruger scolds Sky for his deliberate disobedience, he agrees to cooperate with Jack going forward.
5	"Dogged"	Andrew Merrifield	Jackie Marchand	February 26, 2005
Syd is sent to investigate the mysterious disappearance of several citizens, but is disappointed to be paired with the frequently malfunctioning R.I.C. (Robotic Interactive Canine), who had been pestering her throughout the day. Upon finding a clue, R.I.C. saves her by shielding her from a Krybot's blast, severely damaging himself. Feeling guilty for her earlier attitude towards him, Syd returns the favor by taking R.I.C. to Bridge & Boom for repairs, upgrading him to "R.I.C. Version 2.0." With the newly upgraded R.I.C.'s help, Syd finds that the missing humans have been converted into a type of fuel, and the Rangers use R.I.C.'s new transformation, the Canine Cannon, to capture the culprit, Rhinix, and restore the citizens to normal.
6	"A-Bridged"	Andrew Merrifield	Mark Hoffmeier	March 5, 2005
While searching for an intergalactic bank robber, the B-Squad catch a Trilondon alien (referred to as "T-Top") near the scene of the crime. While the others assume they have their suspect, an unconvinced Bridge requests to perform his own investigation. While Bridge is searching for leads, the Rangers confront the supposed criminal and discover not only that he's innocent of the robbery, but he is a bounty hunter searching for the real culprit. Using his unorthodox methods, Bridge successfully unmasks the real culprit: Hydrax from Planet Fernovia, who reveals she paid a weapons dealer named Broodwing to get T-Top off her back.
7	"Sam"	Charlie Haskell	Bruce Kalish	March 12, 2005
8	"Sam"	Charlie Haskell	John Tellegen	March 19, 2005
Part 1: Kids mock a lonely boy named Sam for his teleportation abilities. He becomes a target for Mora, who promises to be his friend if he helps her creation, Bugglesworth, turn the city's population into dolls. When Z tries to befriend Sam, he refuses. Z and Jack later find Sam and try to convince him that being different isn't a bad thing. However, Bugglesworth appears and convinces Sam to come with him while leaving Jack and Z to deal with a new, extremely powerful Orangehead Krybot. Part 2: After almost being destroyed by the Orangehead Krybot, the Rangers return to base, during which Z recounts a childhood memory, where a cloaked figure saved her from a monster after she ran away from school, where she was bullied. Cruger then reveals that he was the cloaked figure who saved Z, and explains that their parents worked for S.P.D. with Kat for so long, it altered their genes, allowing their kids (the Rangers) to have powers. Sam is the last child of the group. When Kat warns the team that the humans turned to dolls would soon be permanently dolls, Z finally convinces Sam that she is his friend, but Bugglesworth and the henchmen attack them before they can celebrate. With Z captured, Sam uses his power to conjure Bugglesworth's staff and smash it. The Rangers beat the Orangehead with the Canine Cannon, and duel Bugglesworth and his giant robot in the Delta Squad Megazord. Once his robot is destroyed, the Rangers contain Bugglesworth, restoring his victims to normal. Sam is subsequently welcomed into the S.P.D. Academy.
9	"Idol"	Charlie Haskell	David Garber	April 2, 2005
Jack is left in charge while Commander Cruger is away when a U.F.O. crashes into New Tech City. The pilot is revealed to be Sky's old friend, Dru Harrington. While Sky is delighted to see his old comrade again, Jack is immediately suspicious and states that Dru must be reevaluated because he was missing in action. Sky realizes his mistake with trusting his old friend when Doggie returns to the Academy and is wounded by an intruder and hospitalized. The intruder attacks Sky and reveals his identity as Dru, having been working for Broodwing. Jack allows Sky a head start to confront Dru in a final battle.
10	"Stakeout"	Mark Beesley	Jackie Marchand	April 9, 2005
It's Syd's birthday, and she is over the moon with excitement. However, Sinuku has just escaped from a satellite prison, and Jack chooses Syd to assist him in staking out Sinuku's former partner Dr. Rheas, leaving Syd disappointed that she must work on her birthday. During the stakeout, Jack takes a walk and runs into Dr. Rheas, who helps him realize how significant birthdays are, letting him figure out why Syd is so mad at him. When Syd confronts him for nearly blowing their cover by talking to Dr. Rheas, Jack explains that he doesn't know when his birthday is and apologizes to Syd. They are soon called into battle when, during the distraction, Sinuku abducts Dr. Rheas and forces her to tell him where an activator he's looking for is. Jack runs after them and holds them off until the others can join. After putting a stop to Sinuku's plans, the Rangers cheer Syd up with a surprise birthday party.
11	"Shadow"	Mark Beesley	Bruce Kalish	April 16, 2005
12	"Shadow"	Mark Beesley	Bruce Kalish	April 23, 2005
Part 1: Doggie is plagued by nightmares involving his home planet, Sirius, and Emperor Gruumm is plagued by how to defeat the Rangers. Still, Mora gives him advice to beat someone by taking out their leader. To stir up trouble, Gruumm visits Earth and takes a human form to visit Broodwing at Piggy's new restaurant, which he formed from money he won from a discarded winning lottery ticket. Kat discovers a strange energy disturbance caused by Gruumm's visit to General Benagg, an old "friend" of Commander Cruger, causing Cruger's pain only to worsen. Benaag calls Cruger out to battle, but Doggie refuses, revealing to the Rangers the history of Sirius and the origins of S.P.D. However, Kat reminds Cruger that he did not tell the whole truth about his story, and is ambushed by Krybots outside the base and confronted by Benaag after Cruger angrily orders out. Part 2: With Kat missing, the team compensates by bringing in Boom to check the proton spikes. The Rangers then confront Cruger about his worsening attitude towards everyone, forcing Cruger to explain that he lost his wife, Isinia Cruger, during the battle on Sirius. With Gruumm on Earth, the team learns that the spikes, if not deactivated, will cause a major catastrophe. Soon after, an injured R.I.C. returns with a message from Benaag, who reveals Kat as his hostage. Doggie is left with no choice but to fight, despite Kat's warnings of a trap. Doggie sends the Rangers off to deal with the giant energy spikes that have been placed around the city and prepares to face Benaag, taking his Shadow Saber and a Patrol Morpher Kat made for him, which he initially refused to take. Doggie becomes the Shadow Ranger for the first time to defeat Benaag and rescue Kat.
13	"Abandoned"	Britta Johnstone	John Tellegen	April 30, 2005
When the B-Squad begins to take Shadow Ranger for granted, Doggie teaches them a lesson by leaving them on their own to stop Drakel from using the power from an evil stone to resist the sunlight that weakens him and wreak havoc on the city.
14	"Wired"	Britta Johnstone	Jackie Marchand & John Tellegen	May 7, 2005
15	"Wired"	Britta Johnstone	Jackie Marchand & John Tellegen	May 14, 2005
Part 1: The B-Squad finds a standout D-Squad cadet in a girl named Sophie, who succeeds where her fellow D-Squad members failed by defeating Krybots during a training exercise. Meanwhile, Grumm is fed up with Mora's failures, and gives her one last chance to defeat the Rangers to keep her childhood. She recruits the alien Valko to assist her. Valko reveals his plan to defeat the Rangers by attempting the impossible: gaining control of a massive robot named Goradon, using a piece of technology that only S.P.D has. Meanwhile, Sophie takes matters into her own hands to help out when Kat needs to decrypt a new sequence for phase 2 of the base's Delta Base Defense System (D.B.D.S.). The first phase of the D.B.D.S. sees the base morph into the Delta Command Crawler, which moves the base into battle. However, after the battle, Sophie is discovered to be a cyborg, having kept it a secret out of fear of being expelled for not being human. When she is interrogated about trying to access the D.B.D.S., the Rangers – including Bridge, who saw her potential as a cadet – distrust her and she is subsequently expelled. Part 2: Sophie, having been expelled from the academy, falls into Valko's grasp and is taken and hooked up to Goradon's internal systems, while Doggie tells the Rangers off for expelling her based on their understanding of her cyborg body being equipped with technology that they believe is too risky and sends them out to find her. Bridge eventually realizes that Sophie is actually the piece of equipment Valko needed: a Series One Processor Hyper-Intelligent Encryptor (S.O.P.H.I.E.). The Rangers find Valko with Piggy's help, and Cruger captures him and rescues Sophie, who proves to be the key to unlocking phase 2 of the D.B.D.S. program – the Delta Command Megazord, which destroys Goradon. In the end, the Rangers learn not to be prejudiced towards cyborgs. However, having had enough of Mora's failures, Gruumm transforms her into her true form; an adult named Morgana.
16	"Boom"	Andrew Merrifeld	Greg Aronowitz	May 21, 2005
Boom learns his parents, who are unaware of Boom's occupation as a gadget tester, are coming to visit him at the academy, leaving him nervous because he told a lie to them about being a non-existent Orange Ranger. Syd, Z and Bridge help him keep up the rouse while Jack and Sky are captured while hunting down the dimension-hopping General Tomars. When Bridge, Z and Syd go searching for Jack and Sky, Boom puts his fellow Rangers in trouble in an effort to appease his parents. Afterwards, Boom attempts to resign, but makes it up to his parents and his team by helping to rescue Jack and Sky.
17	"Recognition"	Andrew Merrifield	David Garber	June 4, 2005
The Rangers apprehend and take the evil Wootox back to headquarters, which he escapes from by swapping bodies with Sky, destroying the translator, and searching for the Delta Command Megazord controls. Along the way, the fake Sky runs into Kat while the real Sky in Wootox's body must convince the others he truly is himself without an alien translator. R.I.C. ends up being the only one who can tell the difference between the two of them and Sky uses Wootox's powers to swap them back in payback.
18	"Samurai"	Andrew Merrifield	Matt Hawkins	June 11, 2005
Gruumm transports an alien samurai named Katana from ancient Japan to the present via a time portal, and the Rangers are sent to confront the warrior, who is confused by present-day Kyoto looking different than that of his own time. After being tricked by Broodwing that the Rangers are trying to take over Kyoto, Katana duels them while Doggie and Kat head to Japan upon being alerted to the presence of a giant robot. Jack borrows Commander Cruger's Shadow Saber to fight Katana honorably in a one-on-one swordfight, and Katana returns to his own time once another time portal opens (during which a mysterious ball of light emerges from the portal).
19	"Dismissed"	Paul Grinder	Jesse Horsting	June 18, 2005
S.P.D.'s Supreme Commander Fowler Birdie visits Earth. After mocking the Rangers, arrogantly trying to poach Kat, and rudely comparing a Megazord battle to Cruger's fight on Sirius, he orders Cruger to split the Rangers up. When Cruger refuses citing it would make easy targets out of them, Birdie takes over the Delta Base, relieving him of duty. With a distraught Ranger team, Kat tries to console them while dealing with Birdie. Meanwhile, Gruumm heads to Earth to face Commander Cruger in battle (upon being issued a challenge by Cruger, himself) and an energy surge alerts the team. Gruumm easily overpowers the Rangers, who were split up under Birdie's command, forcing Commander Birdie to take matters into his own hands and fight Grumm by himself. Unfortunately, Birdie doesn't fare much better than the Rangers. Upon being informed of Gruumm's arrival, Cruger returns to face Grumm with Kat's help. shows us a flashback of being responsible for Gruumm's missing horn. Afterwards, an apologetic Birdie reinstates him.
20	"Perspective"	Paul Grinder	Bruce Kalish	June 25, 2005
Commander Cruger asks the Rangers to report to him about their mission to stop the World Gold Depository from being robbed, as their video feed of the battle had malfunctioned. Each Ranger delivers a different story, making themselves out to be better than each other. However, the truth comes out once Kat reconstructs the video feed. The fact was that a mysterious ball of light destroyed all the Krybots to free the Rangers.
21	"Messenger"	Paul Grinder	Bruce Kalish	July 10, 2005
22	"Messenger"	Paul Grinder	Jackie Marchand	July 16, 2005
Part 1: A message arrives to S.P.D. from the year 2040, telling of S.P.D.'s defeat at the hands of the Troobian army. While discussing whether they should believe the news or not, Morgana puts her plan into action, taking time to torment Z, who hurt her doll in "Sam: Part 1". Things get even worse when the prophecy seems to come true with the aid of Morgana's most powerful allies, the brothers Shorty and Devastation. Birdie gets back to them upon receiving the news and states that he can't send any help to them, as he fears sending reinforcements might fall into a trap set by Gruum. Part 2: As the Rangers are on the brink of defeat, help arrives in the form of a mysterious individual calling himself the Omega Ranger. Shorty falls to the might of this enigmatic new Ranger, and his OmegaMax Megazord. He refuses to allow the other Rangers to help him in his upcoming battle against Morgana and Devastation, citing that their inferior technology would only get in the way. While trying to get an explanation from Omega Ranger, Morgana and Devastation call him out. When Devastation goes too far by disregarding Morgana's safety to get to Omega, the Rangers must step into action. They are hesitant to help the egotistical future ranger, but Cruger reminds them of their duty and an S.P.D. Code Omega mentioned. Together, the six Rangers put a stop to Morgana's plan. Afterwards, the Omega Ranger later reveals himself to be Sam.
23	"Zapped"	John Laing	Stan Berkowitz	July 25, 2005
When Cruger begins giving more attention to Sam, the Rangers start to grow jealous. Morgana approaches Mysticon, a magician who's down on his luck, and offers him a new wand in exchange for his help in defeating the Rangers. The Rangers defeat and interrogate Mysticon's assistant, Al, where he eventually reveals that he got his wand from Morgana. When Sam is sent to spy on Mysticon's magic show, the Rangers take matters into their own hands and defy Cruger's orders, during which Syd is placed under a spell upon applying to be Mysticon's assistant. Meanwhile, Broodwing begins plotting against Grumm when the emperor forces Broodwing to give a free robot to Mysticon, which is subsequently destroyed by the Rangers' new Megazord combination: the DeltaMax Megazord.
24	"Reflection"	John Laing	Jackie Marchand	August 12, 2005
25	"Reflection"	John Laing	Jackie Marchand	August 12, 2005
Part 1: The B-Squad's day off is brought to a halt when criminals they've already contained attack New Tech City, leaving them perplexed as to how they could've escaped. Upon finding out the criminals are still in containment, Kat borrows Jack's morpher to upload the S.P.D. Battlizer, much to Sky's continued lament about not being the Red Ranger. Later, Sky travels to Gamma Orion and visits Mirloc, a criminal locked in a specially-made cell due to his ability to travel through reflective surfaces, to gather information. Thanks to Sky, the Rangers confront the real culprit: Slate, a copycat criminal whose powers allow him to mimic anyone. Morgana joins Slate and infuses him with a special formula that transforms him, in a divide-and-conquer-like transformation, into all of his impersonations of the criminals the Rangers successfully defeated so far, and Jack calls for his new Battlizer to defeat Slate's team of mutations. In exchange for the info Sky received, Mirloc wants to know what Sky's saddest memory is, and Sky tells the story of his father, who was the Red Ranger years ago, and was slain in battle. Mirloc mocks Sky's story, and the upset Sky sheds a tear. Mirloc takes this opportunity to escape his cell, leaving Sky stunned as he realizes what has happened. Part 2: Mirloc meets Gruumm and is sent out to capture six of the Rangers, while Gruumm plans to deal with Cruger. Mirloc succeeds in imprisoning four Rangers, and Jack borrows Sam's OmegaMax Cycle to deal with a giant rampaging robot. Once Jack is captured, Sam takes on Mirloc alone and manages to free the captured Rangers. Mirloc taunts Sky and his father, and an angry Jack gives Sky the chance to bring Mirloc in with his Red Ranger morpher. Sky morphs into the Red Ranger and uses the Battlizer to defeat Mirloc in honor of his father.
26	"S.W.A.T."	Britta Johnstone	John Tellegen	August 15, 2005
27	"S.W.A.T."	Britta Johnstone	Greg Aronowitz	August 22, 2005
Part 1: The Rangers are constantly fighting with each other, hindering their team efforts when an S.O.S. message warning Cruger and Kat of a horrible upcoming threat puts them on edge and Kat in a rush to finish some updates. However, Kat accidentally destroys her quantum enhancer in her haste, and Z goes to Piggy to get a new one. What they don't know is that Gruumm has put a time limit on Piggy to stop S.P.D., and he takes the chance to give them a new one with a virus inside that Thresher and Stench, Piggy's acquaintances/customers, use to get into S.P.D. files. With Thresher causing a distraction, Stench can download the schematics for the Rangers' new S.W.A.T. (Special Weapons And Tactics) mode. When the Rangers constant bickering causes the criminals to get away, Commander Cruger sends the B-Squad to Planet Zentor to be trained under the watchful eye of Sergeant Silverback. The irate Sergeant and his bulldog-modeled R.I.C. quickly put the Rangers through their paces, pitting them against reprogrammed Krybots and a giant scorpion monster. Part 2: After disappointing Silverback by not already being ready to fight the monster, the Rangers are stripped of their Ranger powers and demoted to D-Squad. Back on Earth, Kat feels sorry for letting the S.W.A.T. mode technology fall into Thresher and Stench's hands. The Rangers are forced to endure grueling training exercises, only to be pushed even harder when they complain. The Sergeant ultimately gets fed up with the Rangers and considers sending them back to Earth with a recommendation for dismissal from the Academy. But when the Rangers ask for a second chance, he puts them through another test where he will have them expelled if they fail. They're able to work hard to prove themselves as a team worthy of being rewarded with the S.W.A.T. Mode. Just in time, too, since Sam and Cruger, in an attempt to take on Thresher and Stench, have been captured. They return to Earth to use their upgrade to defeat Thresher and Stench.
28	"Robotpalooza"	John Laing	Bruce Kalish	August 29, 2005
The Rangers are bombarded with constant attacks from both Gruumm and Broodwing, who recruit Gineka's group to destroy the Rangers, and are on the verge of breaking. Meanwhile, after beating robots piloted by Morgana's creations, the Rangers return to base, where Bridge reveals he had been dream-fighting three other robots and losing sleep in the process. Before getting laughed out of the base, Kat tells everyone robots with the same description Bridge gave had attacked a place off-world. Before it could be looked into further, the Rangers are called again to fight another robot. It's revealed that Broodwing and his companions were responsible for the attack when Bridge had another dream about the future. He goes to fight Broodwing's friends alone. When the DeltaMax Megazord is not enough to drive back these powerful enemies, Kat sends the Rangers new S.W.A.T. Flyers to form the S.W.A.T. Megazord to deal with the fleet of robots.
29	"Katastrophe"	Britta Johnstone	Jackie Marchand	September 26, 2005
Supreme Commander Fowler Birdie offers Kat the chance to work at S.P.D Galaxy Command and the Rangers, not wanting her to leave but wanting her to take the opportunity, try convincing her she isn't needed. During a battle, it's revealed that a monster has gotten all the data on the Rangers' equipment at the fight. After some careful thought, she decides to take up her new position. Boom quickly runs into problems with Kat gone, and the Zords aren't running smoothly anymore. However, Broodwing teams up with Kat's old schoolmate, Mooney, and his mighty robot hides a dangerous weapon: a Helios Generator. After telling Birdie the danger of the Helios Generator, he gives her permission to return to Earth with a specially made 1-hour-lasting Kat Morpher. She tries talking to Mooney, but with the interference from Broodwing, she must morph into Kat Ranger to stop him before it's too late to stop the Helios Generator.
30	"Missing"	John Laing	Bruce Kalish	October 3, 2005
Bridge confronts intergalactic felon Berok on the Rangers' latest mission, only to be knocked out in battle and captured. He awakens in a cold dark room from which there appears to be no escape. With the walls closing in on Bridge, Jack must save his teammate from certain death before it's too late.
31	"History"	Paul Grinder	Jackie Marchand	October 11, 2005
With help from his associate Professor Cerebros, Broodwing uses the Red, Blue, and Yellow Dino Gems to transport Conner, Ethan, and Kira to 2025 as part of his plan to defeat the Rangers and destroy the planet. The three confused Dino Rangers escape with their Gems and are soon cornered by Krybots, only to be saved by the B-Squad and taken back to the Delta Base. Although Doggie insists they remain at the base to avoid disrupting the timeline, the Dino Thunder Rangers decide to do what they feel is right, teaming up with the B-Squad to drive back a robotic army and the Dragoul creature. Guest Starring: James Napier, Kevin Duhaney, and Emma Lahana.
32	"Impact"	Paul Grinder	Jackie Marchand	September 23, 2005
Professor Cerebros alters the course of a meteor to cause it to collide with New Tech City. As if that weren't enough, a more powerful Dragoul has been let loose. The Rangers discover that Professor Cerebros is actually Kraw in disguise, as the Rangers detain him. Although Sky is sent on a solo mission to destroy the meteor, Jack stows away on the S.W.A.T Megazord to try to get in on the action. While the Red and Blue Rangers learn to work together to destroy the meteor, the others are left to deal with Dragoul. Note: This episode had aired out of order.
33	"Badge"	John Laing	Jackie Marchand	October 17, 2005
Ichthior, Commander Cruger's rival from his days on Sirius, returns and puts the Rangers to the test as they are injured and stripped of their badges, leaving Doggie to face him alone. Before Ichthior is detained, he tells Cruger that Isinia is still alive. Meanwhile, Morgana is tasked with obtaining more resources for Grumm, and as a reward for her success, he changes her back to Mora.
34	"Insomnia"	John Laing	John Tellegen	October 28, 2005
After eavesdropping on Doggie and Kat talking about how the A-Squad would have already defeated Gruumm, the depressed B-Squad stay up late to reminisce over their past failures and successes, during which they deduce Gruumm's master plan in the process. Meanwhile, Mora faces the Terror Spacecraft's secret tenant: Omni the Magnificence.
35	"Wormhole"	Paul Grinder	Bruce Kalish	February 2, 2006
Gruumm decides to take drastic measures to stop the Rangers by travelling through a wormhole 21 years into the past where S.P.D. doesn't exist. Upon realizing what Gruumm has done, the B-Squad pursues him to the year 2004 and meets up with the Dino Thunder Rangers again (who don't remember them due to erasing their memories). Meanwhile, Gruumm forces Zeltrax to join his army and ultimately faces the combined might of twelve Rangers who are determined to save the past, present, and future. Guest Starring: James Napier, Kevin Duhaney, Emma Lahana, and Jeffrey Parazzo. Note: This episode aired in Canada on July 30, 2005, before the United States' broadcast. This episode was released on DVD on December 6, 2005 in the United States before its broadcast.
36	"Resurrection"	John Laing	Bruce Kalish	November 4, 2005
Jack meets a girl named Ally Samuels, who shares his passion for helping the needy. Unfortunately, Jack's new relationship interferes with his Ranger duties as he is late to help his friends defeat Broodwing's latest ally, Delex. After the battle, Cruger confronts Jack, who insists that nobody's perfect and he deserves a personal life. Meanwhile, Kat picks up a distress signal, and Cruger sends the Rangers to Gamma Orion, where they find a crashed spaceship and the A-Squad team while detaining the alien that was guarding them. After Cruger unceremoniously sends the B-Squad away when the mission is over, the A-Squad reveals their true colors to Cruger.
37	"Endings"	Greg Aronowitz	Jackie Marchand	November 7, 2005
38	"Endings"	Greg Aronowitz	Bruce Kalish	November 14, 2005
Part 1: The traitorous A-Squad capture Commander Cruger and call out the B-Squad, who meet their counterparts for an intense battle. Meanwhile, Broodwing makes his final push for domination and gathers an army to attack and hijack the Delta Base while the Rangers are away. The B-Squad fights the A-Squad, losing the Delta Squad Megazord in the process. However, thanks to S.W.A.T. Mode and the S.W.A.T. Megazord, B-Squad wins and captures the treasonous rangers. The B-Squad breaks into the Delta Base and contain Broodwing and his allies. Unfortunately, they still have to deal with Gruumm, who catches them with help from Piggy. Part 2: The Rangers are freed from Gruumm's ship by a redeemed Piggy, who regrets betryaing the Rangers and apologizes for his mutiny. The Rangers accept his apology and escape, but Doggie stays behind to rescue his wife, Isinia, who he has learned is alive on Gruumm's ship. Doggie captures Mora and defeats Gruumm, apparently destroying him, and rescues Isinia. Still, Omni becomes a giant biomechanical monster that battles the S.W.A.T. Megazord, which is no match for it. Simultaneously, a Troobian army attacks S.P.D. and the cadets, as Piggy, Sam, Boom, and Kat defend it to no avail until reinforcements in the form of the Nova Ranger from the future, as well as troops from S.P.D. Headquarters arrives (including Sergeant Silverback and Commander Birdie) and defeats the enemy. Kat finds a weakness in Omni, which the Rangers exploit with Cruger's help. Omni is destroyed, and Cruger and Isinia miraculously survive. Gruumm's alive as well, but Cruger easily defeats and captures him. Following this victory, Jack leaves S.P.D., and Sky is promoted to Red Ranger while Bridge is promoted to Blue. Sam and Nova return to the future, with Z saying her farewells and Sam promising to be there in the future. Later, the Rangers visit Jack, but must soon leave to defend the world again.

== Video game ==
There was one game produced for the Space Patrol Delta series, a side-scroller on the Game Boy Advance by THQ. The 6 rangers fight minor enemies until they encounter the main boss. There are racing levels which involve piloting the Red, Yellow, or Pink Delta Runners, a Space Invaders style targeting game with the Green Delta Runner, a racing level involving R.I.C. (the Rangers' robotic dog), and Megazord battle levels.

== Comics ==
A new monthly comic strip based on the series appeared in every issue of Jetix Magazine in the UK in 2005. Jetix Magazine is the official magazine of Jetix, the channel that showed S.P.D. in the UK in 2006. The strip was the first Power Rangers strip to be written by Transformers writer Simon Furman, collaborating for the first time on the PR strip with equally popular TF artist Andrew Wildman, who had previously done artwork for other Power Rangers strips under Jetix Magazines' previous banner of Fox Kids' Wicked.

During the strip, a running subplot involving a rogue Krybot who had become self-aware and rebelled against Grumm gradually unfolded, he would resurface to warn SPD of Grumm's invasion attempt in the final story and supply Jack with a device that once inserted on the Terror, would incapacitate the Krybot fleet.

The strip ended with its own conclusion to the SPD series, the first time any comic strip version of Power Rangers has done a different take on a PR finale. In the strip, A-Squad is brainwashed instead of corrupted and turn against their superiors. The B-Squad regulars deal with them and help Cruger defeat and overcome both Grumm and Omni, before being promoted to A-Squad status.

In 2018, the SPD Rangers appeared in Boom! Studios's "Shattered Grid", a crossover event between teams from all eras commemorating the 25th anniversary of the original television series. It was published in Mighty Morphin Power Rangers #25–30 and various tie-ins. A Power Rangers SPD story by Caleb Goellner and Patrick Mulholland was published in Mighty Morphin Power Rangers 2018 Annual as part of the crossover.
