= 95bFM =

New Zealand student radio station

- New Zealand
- Broadcast area: Auckland Region
- Frequency: 95 MHz
- Branding: bFM

Programming
- Format: News and music

Ownership
- Owner: Auckland University Students Association
- Operator: Campus Radio bFM Limited

History
- First air date: c. 1969; 57 years ago

Links
- Website: 95bfm.com

95bFM is a New Zealand student radio station. It operates in Auckland on a Schedule 7 (educational purposes) semi-commercial licence. The station was based in the Student Union Building at the University of Auckland from 1969 to 2026. In July 2026, the station relocated to Karangahape Road.

The station is owned by a trust on behalf of the Auckland University Students Association (AUSA), and broadcasts its signal to greater Auckland at 95.0 on the FM dial. It was the promoter of the b Net New Zealand Music Awards and the popular Summer Series live events in nearby Albert Park, Auckland.

The station has developed into one of New Zealand's most listened-to alternative music broadcasters, with an estimated 100,000 listeners. During the 2005 general election campaign, the station's news and editorial director Noelle McCarthy conducted an interview in which National Party leader Don Brash admitted that he had forewarning of a controversial leaflet campaign conducted by the Exclusive Brethren sect. Breakfast show hosts regularly interview New Zealand political figures. The centrepiece of the news operation is The Wire, a music and current affairs show that airs every weekday from noon to 1pm.

Alongside the flagship slots which include bFM Breakfast, Morning Glory, The Wire, Afternoon and Drive, there are also specialist programmes like Rhythm Selection, Freak the Sheep, and the 95bFM Top 10 and the Sunday "best of" show. Its creative department creates most of its own broadcast advertising, rather than using supplied agency material, as most commercial radio does.

== History ==
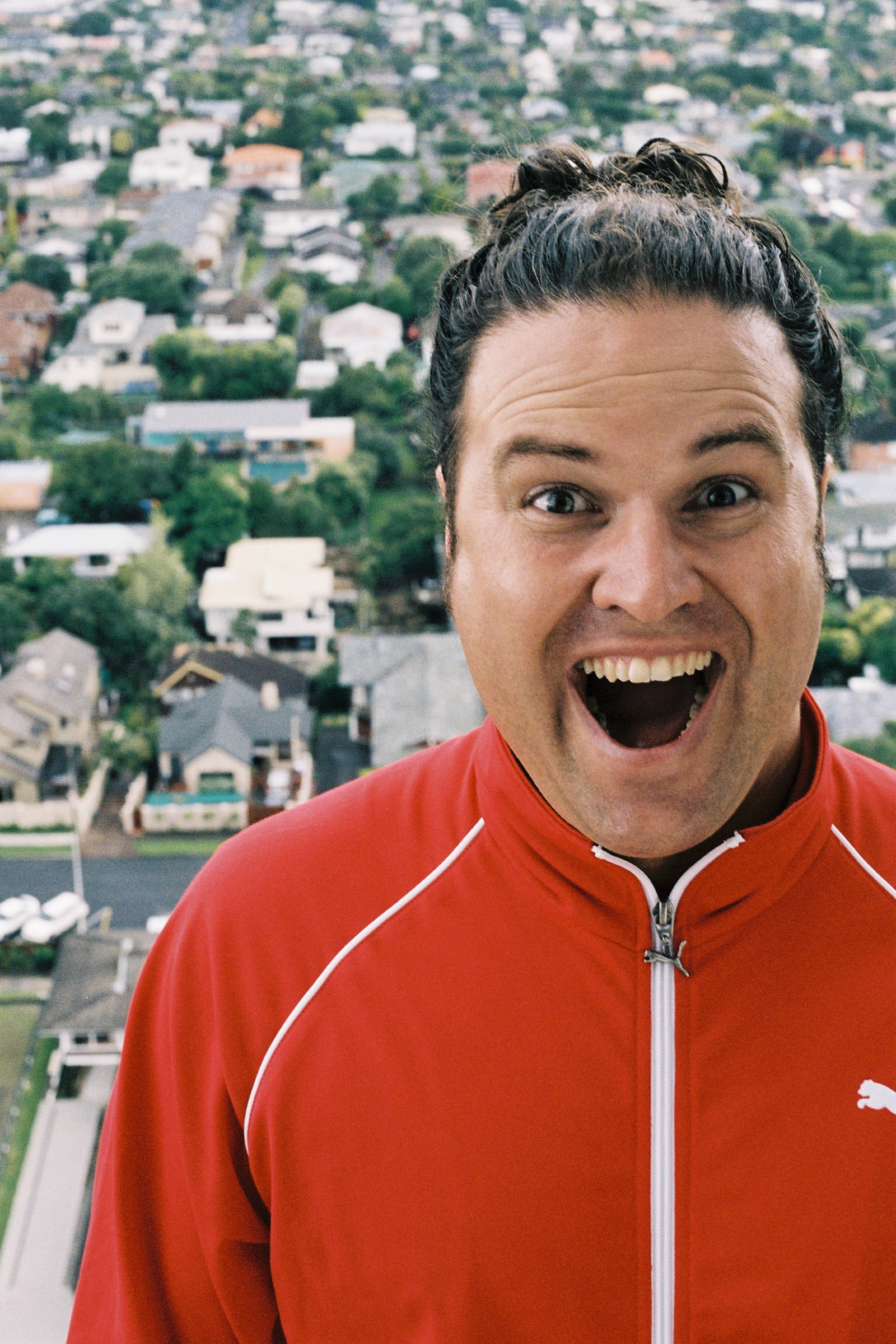
Breakfast host Mikey Havoc

Founded in 1969 as a capping stunt, bFM was a pirate student radio station, broadcast from a boat - which ran aground in Auckland's Waitematā Harbour - and played illegally on speakers around the University. The iconic ‘b’ originally stood for "bosom". The station was originally run as an AUSA club but by the mid-1980s had seven staff (paid a nominal wage) and 100+ volunteers. All staff were voted into their position by collective vote - the collective being the staff and volunteers of the station at the time, with the appointments ratified by the AUSA.

The AUSA formed Campus Radio BFM Limited in 1989 and required the station to run at break-even after it had run up significant losses in previous years. That was not popular with many staff and volunteers, some of whom resigned when new station manager Simon Laan took over and started implementing changes recommended in a report titled "Saving BFM" by Kerr Inkson and Kelly Grove Hill (from the Auckland University School of Business). Their report had been commissioned by previous station manager Jude Anaru. Laan was the last station manager to be elected to that position, after he lobbied the Board to change its appointment processes and dispense with the voting system.

It transferred permanently from the AM to FM band (originally to 91.8FM, now the frequency of More FM) in 1985, after a long legal application process (opposed by all other commercial radio stations operating in Auckland) begun in 1984 by station manager Debbi Gibbs, daughter of prominent New Zealand businessman Alan Gibbs, and completed by her successor Jude Anaru in 1988.

The station initially broadcast on the FM band by applying only for a temporary short term broadcasting warrant, and then applying for another one when that one expired. This upset commercial radio stations who were also trying to make the switch from AM to FM, but were delayed by the New Zealand Government who were slowly auctioning off commercial frequencies to commercial broadcasters. By 'drip feeding' commercial frequencies onto the market the Government found it could maximise auction prices. In holding a Schedule 7 (educational purposes) semi-commercial licence, bFM did not have to pay for its frequency.

During the 1980s the station changed its name from Radio B to Campus Radio (1404 AM), then back to Radio B, and then finally bFM. Its hours expanded and it eventually became a 24-hour station operating on a permanent warrant in 1989. In 1985, the station began publishing a companion magazine, known as the Book of BiFiM.

Most show hosts are volunteers. The distinctive 95bFM 'b' logo was designed by Johnnie Pain, commissioned by then station manager Liz Tan to design it. The previous logo had been chosen through a vote by station staff and volunteers from a selection of entries in a public logo competition run by previous station manager Simon Laan.

== Programme ==
bNews, the station's news and editorial wing, features the talents of Noelle McCarthy, Simon Pound, Rebecca Wright and Russell Brown. bNews also deploys political satire through a number of witty "bird calls" for many local politicians and a fictitious character, Rob the Young National who parodies the New Zealand National Party.

bFM also runs events such as the bNet music awards.

== Alumni ==
Former staff include Mark "Slave" Williams, Otis Frizzell, Simon Grigg, and former MediaWorks New Zealand chief executive and radio host Brent Impey. DJ Sirvere (Philip Bell) and DJ Sicoff (Simon Coffey) made some of their first public appearances on bFM. Radio Hauraki hosts Jeremy Wells, Matt Heath and Mikey Havoc began their radio careers on bFM Breakfast, while Nick Dwyer has hosted a breakfast show on George FM and Charlotte Ryan now hosts the drive programme on Kiwi FM. Rhys Darby and David Farrier hosted a programme on the station from 2010 to 2012, a partnership they continued with Netflix series Short Poppies.

Russell Brown, Noelle McCarthy and Wallace Chapman have gone on from roles with bFM to careers with Radio New Zealand, TVNZ and other media outlets. RadioLive personalities Marcus Lush, Graeme Hill and Chris Forster and Newstalk ZB presenters and producers Andrew Topping, Andrew Dickens and Tania McKenzie-Cook all honed their skills with bFM. Other former alumni include 3 News journalists Rebecca Wright and Kim Choe, ABC journalist Charlotte Glennie; Nine News journalist, Robert Herrick and print journalists Hannah Sarney (Financial Times), Hugh Sundae and Paul Casserly.

== Controversies ==
A long-running promo featuring the phrase "fuck-knuckles, cock and piss, balls", which had been in circulation since 1996 as means to promote the services of the Broadcasting Services Authority, only received its first complaint in 2021. In March of that year, Jeremy Evans complained to the organisation and considered the ending of the BSA promo, with the aforementioned phrase, to have a "juvenile sense of humour".

The promo was created by Bob Kerrigan. With the planned abolition of the BSA in May 2026, the promo will likely be removed from circulation. As of the time of the decision, its only complaint was received in 2021.
