= Carolyn Dando =

New Zealand actress and singer

- Born: Auckland, New Zealand
- Occupation: Actress
- Years active: 2006–present

Carolyn Dando (28 April 1989) is an actress and singer from Auckland, New Zealand.

Dando's first role was in the TV film Fatal Contact: Bird Flu in America (2006).

Dando next appeared in Peter Jackson's feature film adaptation of The Lovely Bones (2009).

== Early life ==
Dando was born in Auckland, New Zealand. As a young child she had a passion for music, not acting. At the age of 10 years she was picked to sing with Suzanne Prentice at a World Vision "Kids for Kids" Concert. The following year she gave a solo performance in front of several hundred schoolchildren and their parents at the annual regional school choir festival, with guests including the Mayor of Auckland City. She was encouraged by teachers to develop her talent, and began to study classical singing (as well as theory and piano) with the professional soprano Gina Sanders.

== Career ==
Her first professional role was in Fatal Contact: Bird Flu in America, a made-for-television movie. But her big break came when she landed a part in The Lovely Bones. In 2010, she appeared on the show Shortland Street. In 2012 she appeared as Hailey in Girl vs. Boy.

== Filmography ==
Film and television
Year	Title	Role	Notes
2006	Fatal Contact: Bird Flu in America	Lauren Connelly	TV film
2009	The Lovely Bones	Ruth Connors	
2009	Legend of the Seeker	Veta	Episode: "Fury"
2010	Shortland Street	Paula Sinclair (Penny Rourke)	Recurring role
2011	Nothing Trivial	Georgia	Episodes: "What Is the Expression...", "Who Said..."
2012–13	Girl vs. Boy	Hailey	Recurring role
2013	The Blue Rose	Hayley	Episode: "Paint a Vulgar Picture"
2014	White Lies	Katie	Short film
2014	Dick Off	Sweet Bit of Sugar On The Side	Short film
2015	The Monster of Mangatiti	Christine	TV film
2015	Power Rangers Dino Charge	Assistant	Episode: "Rise of a Ranger"
2016	The Shannara Chronicles	Utopian woman	Episode: "Utopia"
