= Girl vs. Boy =

- Genre: Teen situation comedy Comedy drama
- Written by: Martha Hardy Ward; Paul Yates; David Stubbs & Thomas Robins
- Directed by: David Stubbs & Thomas Robins
- Starring: Courtney Abbot; Carolyn Dando; Emma Draper; Abby Damen; Will Robertson; Josh McKenzie; Nathan Brabender; Chris Parker
- Country of origin: New Zealand
- Original language: English
- No. of seasons: 3
- No. of episodes: 21

Production
- Running time: 30 minutes
- Production companies: KHF Media; NZ on Air; TVNZ

Original release
- Network: TV2
- Release: 2012

Girl vs. Boy is a New Zealand teen situation comedy filmed in Seatoun, Wellington and produced by KHF Media, NZ on Air and TVNZ. The series takes place in the perfect, tight knit suburb of The Bay, where the dramatic breakup of Hailey (Carolyn Dando) and Tim (Josh McKenzie) has divided the whole community which leaves Maxine (Courtney Abbot), a self-proclaimed 'love-detective,' to investigate the breakup, settle the conflict and reunite the tight knit community.

In the second season, The Bay is keen to maintain its reputation in the New Zealand's Happiest Suburb competition. The Bay tries everything it can to make Maxine and Jack the happy poster couple for its campaign.

In the third season, the new principal wants to divide girls and boys at school. Maxine and her friends must work out why the principal is on this mission, and her history with the people of the bay. School camp is a key event, as well as Student elections, with Max, Olaf, Grayson and Gina all running for a position.

== Characters ==
- Maxine Small is the main character of the series. She is known for her good-intentioned meddling in the lives of her friends. She is awkward, goofy, and well liked by the people of the bay. She is often called Max.
- Hailey, Max's best friend. She is a key part of the first series that concerns her break up with next door neighbour and childhood sweetheart Tim. She is smart and friendly, but occasionally gets frustrated with Max's meddling.
- Tim, Hailey's next door neighbour and boyfriend. He goes through a goth stage and in season two works on an oil rig. He is good friends with Max.
- Gina, Max's friend. She is known for her sassy attitude and feminist beliefs. Her quick-thinking and perceptiveness often helps a confused Max. People know not to cross her, but she also has a warm heart and will do anything for her friends. She unexpectedly develops strong feelings for Olaf.
- Jake, Max's love interest. He wears a cage on his neck/head for the majority of the time because Gina punched him, after she mistakenly thought he insulted her. He is awkward like Max. He tries to be a bad boy in season two, but this is not in his nature. He is the richest of the teenagers, but has the loneliest family life. He is good friends with Grayson.
- Grayson, a friend of the other teenagers. He is smooth, or at least he likes to think he is, and is constantly getting himself in trouble with his cheeky attitude and attempts to be cool.
- Olaf, a mute Norwegian who develops a major crush on Max in season one. He is very sensitive, and likes nature, music and art. He is frequently misunderstood by the people of the bay, but generally liked for his gentle nature. He is the brother of Kjesten. He ends up dating Gina.
- Kjesten, Olaf's sister. She is a scheming troublemaker who always seems to be involved when trouble finds its way into Maxine's life. She is poised, intelligent and calculating. She develops a crush on Tim.
- Tom, a newcomer to The Bay from the valley. He raises everyone's suspicions when they realise he code switches on purpose. It is revealed he just wants to make friends, and is accepted as a member of Maxine's friend group. He initially likes Max, but turns his attention towards Hailey in season 3.
- Sarah, Hailey's sister. A lot of the drama in the first season centres around her wedding day.
- Ben, Sarah's fiance. He plays lawn bowls.
- Daisy, who goes to school with the other teenagers. She sabotages their various efforts to unite the school. She is disliked at first, but she redeems herself to some extent.

The adults have distinct personalities. Max's Mum is a psychologist who is very emotional, caring and quirky. Max's Dad is also a psychologist, and occurs in season 3. Tim's father loves attention and tells people about his acting ability, often competing for the limelight with Al. Tim's mother works on the oil rig, and her main presence occurs through skype. Hailey's Dad is sensitive and serious. Al, the owner of the video shop, knows every film reference and likes to get involved with the Bay's drama. The Principal, Ms King, is strict and angry, but has a softer side as revealed through her relationship with Al.
