= Fatal Contact: Bird Flu in America =

2006 American-New Zealand made-for-television film

- Home video cover art
- Genre: Thriller; Disaster; Drama
- Written by: Richard McGee
- Directed by: Richard Pearce
- Starring: Joely Richardson; Stacy Keach; Scott Cohen; Ann Cusack; Justina Machado; David Ramsey
- Theme music composer: Mark Adler
- Countries of origin: United States; New Zealand
- Original language: English

Production
- Producer: Dennis A. Brown
- Cinematography: Ivan Strasburg
- Running time: 83 minutes
- Production companies: Sony Pictures Television; Diana Kerew Productions

Original release
- Network: ABC
- Release: 9 May 2006

Fatal Contact: Bird Flu in America is an American-New Zealand made-for-television medical thriller/disaster film that first aired on the ABC television network on May 9, 2006. In the movie, an American businessman visiting China is infected, and carries the deadly mutated bird flu virus back via jetliner to the USA, soon it spreads throughout the country then the rest of the world. Before the movie ends, riots erupt, armed mobs try to hijack vaccines, and authorities predict that up to 350 million people will die worldwide."

== Plot ==
A mutated bird flu virus spreads across the world. As panic spreads, the governor of Virginia quarantines neighborhoods where cases have cropped up, and federal officials confess they have no vaccine and scant supplies of antiviral drugs. Major socioeconomic disruption sets in, with shortages of food and medical supplies, power outages, and riots in the streets of New York.

Eventually, a vaccine is discovered in France and the pandemic begins to subside. However, near the end of the movie it is the discovered that a mutated virus has killed everyone in an Angolan village and a second wave of cases will begin causes further panic.

== Cast ==
- Joely Richardson as Dr. Iris Varnack
- Stacy Keach as Collin Reed
- Ann Cusack as Denise Connelly
- Justina Machado as Alma Ansen
- Scott Cohen as Governor Mike Newsome
- David Ramsey as Curtis Ansen
- John Atkinson as Ed Connelly
- Carolyn Dando as Lauren Connelly
- Kodi Smit-McPhee as Toby Connelly
- Sara Wiseman as Susan Wood
- Steve Bastoni as FEMA Director McGarrett
- Jonny Pasvolsky as Governor Newsome's Aide
- Jerome Ehlers as Chad Sinclair

== Reception ==
The editorial staff at CIDRAP (Center for Infectious Disease Research and Policy) at the University of Minnesota write: "The creators of the fictional ABC-TV movie Fatal Contact: Bird Flu in America blended medical facts from the 1918 influenza pandemic with current predictions from flu experts to portray a contemporary flu pandemic, but they added a liberal dash of sensationalism. The disease shown in the film, aired May 9, bore a strong resemblance to the illness that killed an estimated 675,000 Americans in 1918 and 1919. And a good many of the issues raised came straight out of the US government's pandemic preparedness plans and recent news stories about possible pandemic scenarios. But some scenes and details went well beyond what happened in 1918 or what is plausible today. And along the way, important medical details were left out."
