= David Aston =

New Zealand actor

- Born: 1953 (age 72–73); Auckland, New Zealand
- Died: 2026
- Occupations: Actor, voice actor, presenter, musician, singer
- Years active: 1979–present

David Aston was a New Zealand actor, presenter for non-broadcast in-house videos, television commercials, voiceover artist and singer. He portrayed Rhineheart in The Matrix, Caldor in Legend of the Seeker, Tyldus in Xena: Warrior Princess, and Coloman in Underworld: Rise of the Lycans. Aston died in 30 July 2026.

== Early life ==
David Aston received Diploma in Drama from University of Auckland, Theatre Corporate. His early performance were for Mercury Theatre, Theatre Corporate, at Centrepoint Theatre from 1979 to 1989 where he played Shakespearian roles like King Lear, Macbeth, Petruchio, Oberon.

== Theatre plays ==
David Aston has acted in many theatre plays for Mercury Theatre, Auckland Theatre Company, Silo Theatre, Fortune Theatre, Court Theatre.

=== Mercury theatre plays ===
- Turondat (1990)
- Fiddler on the Roof (1989)
- West Wide Story (1987)

=== Auckland theatre company plays ===
- The Crucible (2006, as Thomas Putnam)
- Equus (2005)
- Caligula (2004)
- Copenhagen (2001)

=== Silo theatre plays ===
- Plenty (2006)
- The Jungle (2006)
- Closer (2004)
- You my only one? (2003)

=== Fortune theatre plays ===
- Split down the middle (2001)
- Art (2000)

=== Court theatre plays ===
- The God Boy (1999)

=== Other plays ===
- Phantom of the opera (1998, Tour of Japan)
- Hamlet/Macbeth (1998, Tour of Auckland School)
- Arcadia (1997)
- Hamlet (1997, Tour of Auckland School)
- Blood Brothers (1994, Australia-New Zealand Tour)
- Restless Ecstasy (2002)

== Television ==
- Shortland Street (2010)
- Fatal Contact: Bird Flu in America (2006)
- Not Only But Always (2004)
- Street Legal (series III & IV, 2002)
- Duggan Dog's Breakfast (1999)
- Xena: Warrior Princess (1995)
- Riding High (1995)
- Hercules: The Legendary Journeys (1995)
- Coverstory (1994)
- True Life Stories (1994)
- Deepwater Haven (1994)
- High Tide (1994)
- Shortland Street (1992–93)
- White Fang (1993)
- Soldier Soldier III (1993)
- In Touch FM (1993)
- Homeward Bound (1992)
- Marlin Bay (1992)
- Gloss III (1989)
- The Seekers (1985)
- Country GP (1984)

== Filmography ==
Year	Title	Role	Notes
1983	Out of Time	Harry	
1993	The Passenger		
1993	Mirage	Lead	
1999	The Matrix	Rhineheart	
2001	Atomic Twister	Man	
2002	Murder in Greenwich	Chief Ferris	
2003	The Last Samurai	British Diplomat	
2003	The Lord of the Rings: The Return of the King	Gondorian Soldier 3	
2003	The Mystery of Treasure Island	Police Sergeant	
2006	Fatal Contact: Bird Flu in America	Reporter No. 1	
2007	We Are Here to Help	Charles Gavin	
2009	Underworld: Rise of the Lycans	Coloman	
