= Lucy Elliott =

New Zealand actress (born 1994)

- Born: Lucy Gabriel Elliott; 1994 (age 31–32); New Zealand
- Occupation: Actor
- Years active: 2011–present
- Relatives: Peter Elliott (father)

Lucy Gabriel Elliott (born 1994) is a New Zealand actress, most known for her role as Danya Jenkins on the soap opera Shortland Street from 2013 until 2016.

== Life and career ==
Elliott joined the cast of Shortland Street in 2013, playing "wayward teen" Danya Jenkins. Elliott had to research the characteristics of bipolar disorder as part of preparing for the role. Elliott's father, Peter Elliott, had previously appeared on Shortland Street from 1996 to 1999, and Elliott has described him as her acting inspiration. She also starred as Lauren in the 2015 web series Auckward Love and has appeared in commercials.

In 2015 Elliott and fellow Shortland Street actress Grace Palmer formed a celebrity team for the World Vision 40 Hour Famine. In 2016 she left Shortland Street, and in 2018 she was described as taking a break from acting to illustrate books. She has spoken out about her experiences with anxiety and depression, including giving talks in schools about mental health.

Elliott is also a Twitch streamer under the channel name beesneez, predominantly streaming roleplay on WildRP, a Red Dead Redemption 2 roleplaying server.
