= John Tui =

New Zealand actor (born 1975)

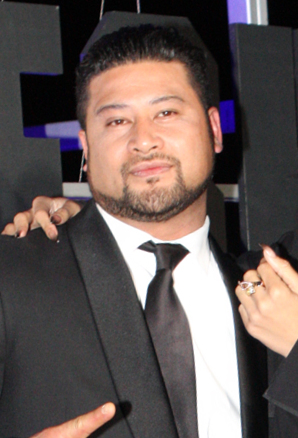
- Tui at the Battleship premiere in 2012
- Born: 11 June 1975 (age 51); Auckland, New Zealand
- Education: Unitec's School of Performing and Screen Arts
- Occupation: Actor
- Years active: 2003–present
- Spouse: Liyah (m. 2002)
- Children: 5

John Tui (pronounced two-we; born 11 June 1975) is a New Zealand actor of Tongan descent. He is known for his roles as Anubis "Doggie" Cruger in Power Rangers S.P.D. and as Daggeron in Power Rangers Mystic Force, both filmed in his native New Zealand. He has since transitioned to roles in Hollywood projects such as Hobbs & Shaw and Young Rock.

== Personal life ==
Tui was born on 11 June 1975 in Auckland and grew up in Manurewa. In 2002, he married Liyah. He has five children, including twin sons. His youngest was born the day after his 49th birthday.

== Filmography ==
=== Film ===
Year	Film	Role	Notes
2003	Leoleo io lou Uso	Siaosi	
2003	Cold Peas	Michael	
2003	Alternative	Tasi	
2006	Sione's Wedding	Tavita	
2012	Battleship	Chief Petty Officer Walter "Beast" Lynch	
2014	The Hobbit: The Battle of the Five Armies	Bolg	
2015	Born to Dance	Zack	
2018	Solo: A Star Wars Story	Korso	
2019	Hobbs & Shaw	Kal Hobbs	
2019	Savage	Moses	
2020	The Legend of Baron To'a	Baron To'a	
2026	Moana	Chief Tui	

=== Television ===
Year	Series	Role	Note
2005	Power Rangers S.P.D.	Commander Anubis "Doggie" Cruger / Shadow Ranger; Sergeant Silverback	38 episodes
2005	Mataku	Bones	Episode: "The Chosen Ones"
2006	Power Rangers Mystic Force	Daggeron / Solaris Knight	19 episodes
2006	Outrageous Fortune	Carlos Sevele	Episode: "Thy Name Is Woman"
2009	Go Girls	Timbo	32 episodes
2010	Shortland Street	Dollar	10 episodes
2012	Power Rangers Super Samurai	Pestilox	Episode: "A Crack in the World"
2013	Shortland Street	Travis Corfield	Recurring role
2021–2023	Young Rock	Afa Anoa'i	Recurring role
2024	Plum	Brick	TV series 5 episodes

=== Short films ===
Year	Short Film	Role
2001	Lying Flat	Tom
2002	Kei Hea te Kuri?	Toka
2002	Briefcase	Big Boss
2002	What Bro?	Semi
2002	Fepaki	Semisi

=== Theatre ===
Year	Play	Role
2002	Blood Wedding	Woodcutter
2002	Big River	Slave
2002	Julius Caesar	Marcus Brutus
2003	Hamlet	Servant to Claudius
2003	Never Long Gone	Michael
2003	Othello	Othello
2003	Gifted Tour – Wendel	Father

=== Video games ===
Year	Title	Role
2023	Overwatch 2	Mauga
