= Hugh Sundae =

New Zealand broadcaster and journalist

- Born: Ian Hughes; Auckland, New Zealand
- Other name: Hugh Hughes
- Occupations: Broadcaster, journalist
- Years active: 1992-present
- Known for: 95bFM breakfast host, the Sundae Sessions.

Hugh Sundae (born Ian Hughes) is a New Zealand broadcaster and journalist. He is best known for his radio work at University of Auckland campus radio 95bFM, as a television presenter, and as the digital entertainment producer at the New Zealand Herald.

== Career ==
Sundae started volunteering at Auckland University campus radio 95bFM in 1992 at the age of 14, helping out in the office. This eventually led to DJ work, with Sundae filling in for breakfast host Graeme Hill, at age 17. In 1995, Sundae was asked to turn a popular station promo for the New Zealand music show Freak the Sheep into a song. The comedy single "What's Wrong With Huntly" was released through Virgin Records and reached No.37 on the New Zealand singles chart.

Born Ian Hughes, the name Hugh Sundae came from 95bFM manager Graeme Hill nicknaming Sundae 'Hugh'. Sundae chose the surname 'Sundae' while "joking around" with the autocue at the TV3 news desk and wanting to pick a "really insane" newsreader name.

Sundae co-presented the TV2 music show Music Nation in 1995, along with the then-up-and-coming musician Bic Runga. In 2000, Sundae joined the late-night TV3 series Ice As, a reworked version of the long-running Ice TV series. He co-hosted the series with Petra Bagust and Jon Bridges until the series was cancelled in 2001. He went on to co-host TV2's live late-night music show Space with Jaquie Brown. The pair left the show at the end of 2002.

Sundae stepped into the role of breakfast host at 95bFM in 2002, a job he held for two and a half years before choosing to leave. After leaving 95bFM, he became an entertainment reporter at TVNZ, working on the Tonight Late News show and current affairs show Close Up.

Sundae moved to the UK in the mid 2000s and worked as a director on Rockfeedback TV. On returning to New Zealand, he worked as a reporter on TVNZ's 20/20 show. He then took up the role of digital entertainment producer at the New Zealand Herald. As part of this, he launched the acclaimed Sundae Sessions, a series of live performances by New Zealand artists. Sundae also hosts a weekly show on Kiwi FM called Voices from the Wilderness, which showcases unsigned New Zealand artists.

Sundae co-founded the New Zealand Film Awards in 2012, along with New Zealand film industry figure Ant Timpson. After the previous Aotearoa Film & Television Awards ended in 2011 with no replacement, the duo launched the Sorta Unofficial New Zealand Film Awards as an alternative. In 2013 the awards became known as the New Zealand Film Awards and are now considered the official awards ceremony of the New Zealand film industry.

In 2015 Sundae was appointed general manager of 95bFM, a role which he held until his resignation in 2018.

== Discography ==
=== Singles ===
Year	Title	Peak chart positions	Album
Year	Title	NZ	Album
1995	"What's Wrong with Huntly?" (Hugh and the New Zealanders)	37	Non-album single

== Credits ==
=== Radio ===
- 95bFM breakfast host (2002)
- Voices From the Wilderness (2014)

=== Television ===
- Music Nation (1995)
- Ice As (2000)
- Space (2001)
- Tonight (2003)
- Close Up (2003)
- Intrepid Journeys - Mongolia (2004)
- Rockfeedback TV (2006)
- 20/20 (2009)
