= Beth Allen =

New Zealand actress (born 1984)

- Born: Elizabeth Grace Nell Allen; 28 May 1984 (age 42); Titirangi, New Zealand
- Occupation: Actress
- Years active: 1993–present
- Spouse: Charles McDermott (m. 2011)

Elizabeth Grace Nell Allen (born 28 May 1984) is a New Zealand actress. She has been acting since an early age and has appeared in several small productions and commercials since 1993. Her first major television role was in Cloud 9's The Legend of William Tell in 1998, in which she played Princess Vara. Internationally known for her role as Amber in The Tribe, she took on the role in 1998 for the first series, before deciding to leave the show to concentrate on her school work. She later returned for another three seasons.

== Career ==
Allen's other works includes a lead role in the episode "The Green Dress" of the TV programme William Shatner's A Twist in the Tale in 1999 and guest parts in Xena: Warrior Princess and Revelations - The Initial Journey.

In 2006, she played the role of Ellie on Treasure Island Kids' Trilogy. She has also had guest roles on various television series, including Power Rangers: S.P.D., Outrageous Fortune and Power Rangers: Operation Overdrive.

In 2008 Allen joined Shortland Street as Dr Brooke Freeman, where she was a main cast member until 2014 when her character departed. Beth has also been involved in several theatre plays during her career, many produced by her husband's theatre company The Basement Theatre. Beth herself has helped produce a few plays, including Little Blonde Hen, and Vagina Monologues.

== Personal life ==
Allen was born in Titirangi, New Zealand.

Allen married her long-term fiancé Charles McDermott in February 2011. The couple had a son Sidney born in 2016, a daughter Nell born in 2018, and Allen is currently expecting her third child due in June 2020 as confirmed by her in a new Podcast interview with The Tribe creator Ray Thompson on Youtube, uploaded on 4 April 2020.

== Filmography ==
Television and film roles
Year	Title	Role	Notes
1995	Riding High	Eva	Episodes: 1.33, 1.38
1997	The Ugly	Julie, aged 13	Film
1998	The Legend of William Tell	Princess Vara	Main role
1999	Xena: Warrior Princess	Pilee / Vanessa	Episode: "Daughter of Pomira"
1999	A Twist in the Tale	Rose Martinelli	Episode: "The Green Dress"
1999–2003	The Tribe	Amber/Eagle	Main role (series 1, 3–5)
2002	Revelations – The Initial Journey	Anna	Episode: "A Dream of Flying"
2002	Murder in Greenwich	Julia Skakel	TV film
2005	Outrageous Fortune	Chantelle	Episode: "My Dearest Foe"
2005	Power Rangers S.P.D.	Ally Samuels	Episodes: "Resurrection", "Endings: Parts 1 & 2"
2006	Treasure Island Kids: The Battle of Treasure Island	Ellie	Film
2006	Treasure Island Kids: The Monster of Treasure Island	Ellie	Film
2006	Treasure Island Kids: The Mystery of Treasure Island	Ellie	Film
2007	Power Rangers Operation Overdrive	Vella	Recurring role, 6 episodes
2008–2014, 2023, 2025	Shortland Street	Brooke Freeman	Main role (395 episodes)
2017	Westside	Fleeky fanny	Episode #3.4
2020	Power Rangers Beast Morphers	Udonna (voice)/Clean-Up Worker	2 episodes
2021–2022	Power Rangers Dino Fury	Green Morphin' Master	Recurring role, 5 episodes

== Theatre ==
Year	Title	Role	Theatre	Notes
2005	Billy Liar		Lopdell House	
2007	Equus		Glen Eden Playhouse	
2007	The Feminine	Jenny	Cross Street Studios	
2008	The Eight: Reindeer Monologues		The Basement Theatre	
2009	Little Blonde Hen		Venue 4:20	also Producer
2009	Killer Joe	Dottie		
2010	Vagina Monologues		The Basement Theatre	
2010	TOYS		The Basement Theatre	
