= List of Outrageous Fortune characters =

Outrageous Fortune is a New Zealand comedy-drama television series, revolving around the West family. The series was created by James Griffin and Rachel Lang. The series premiered on 12 July 2005 featuring an ensemble cast, which has included: Robyn Malcolm, Grant Bowler, Antony Starr, Siobhan Marshall, Antonia Prebble, Frank Whitten and Kirk Torrance.

== Overview ==
Color key:

Series regular

Appearances

No appearances

Character	Series					
Character	1	2	3	4	5	6
=== Main cast ===
Cheryl West	Robyn Malcolm	Robyn Malcolm	Robyn Malcolm	Robyn Malcolm	Robyn Malcolm	Robyn Malcolm
Wolfgang "Wolf" West	Grant Bowler	Grant Bowler	Grant Bowler (Note: Grant Bowler is credited as "Starring" from "Where the Offence Is, Let the Great Axe Fall" (3.22). In "Feats So Crimeful" (3.10), "Bow Stubborn Knees" (3.15), and "The Corrupted Currents of This Worl" (3.21) he is credited as "Guest Starring".)	Grant Bowler	Grant Bowler	
Van West	Antony Starr	Antony Starr	Antony Starr	Antony Starr	Antony Starr	Antony Starr
Jethro West	Antony Starr	Antony Starr	Antony Starr	Antony Starr	Antony Starr	Antony Starr
Pascalle West	Siobhan Marshall	Siobhan Marshall	Siobhan Marshall	Siobhan Marshall	Siobhan Marshall	Siobhan Marshall
Loretta West	Antonia Prebble	Antonia Prebble	Antonia Prebble	Antonia Prebble	Antonia Prebble	Antonia Prebble
Theodore "Ted" West	Frank Whitten	Frank Whitten	Frank Whitten	Frank Whitten	Frank Whitten	Frank Whitten
Wayne Judd	Kirk Torrance	Kirk Torrance	Kirk Torrance	Kirk Torrance	Kirk Torrance (Note: Kirk Torrance is credited as "Starring" from "All My Sins Remember'd" (5.1))	Kirk Torrance
=== Recurring cast ===
Eric Grady	Brian Sergent	Brian Sergent			Brian Sergent	Brian Sergent
Jared "Munter" Mason	Tammy Davis	Tammy Davis	Tammy Davis	Tammy Davis	Tammy Davis	Tammy Davis
Caroline Darling	Katrina Browne	Katrina Browne				
Glen Hickey	Rohan Glynn	Rohan Glynn	Rohan Glynn			
Kurt	Dane Dawson	Dane Dawson				
Tracy Hong	Michelle Ang	Michelle Ang				
Mr. Hong	Trevor Sai Louie	Trevor Sai Louie	Trevor Sai Louie			
Franklin "Corky" Corke	Jason Hoyte		Jason Hoyte			
Suzy Hong	Josephine Davison	Josephine Davison				
Draska Doslic	Aidee Walker	Aidee Walker	Aidee Walker			Aidee Walker
Rochelle Stephens	Roz Turnbull	Roz Turnbull	Roz Turnbull	Roz Turnbull	Roz Turnbull	Roz Turnbull
Barry "Sparky" Gibbs	John Leigh	John Leigh	John Leigh	John Leigh	John Leigh	John Leigh
Falani	David Fane	David Fane	David Fane	David Fane	David Fane	David Fane
Kasey Mason	Nicole Whippy	Nicole Whippy	Nicole Whippy	Nicole Whippy	Nicole Whippy	Nicole Whippy
Monica Judd	Kate Louise Elliott	Kate Louise Elliott	Kate Louise Elliott	Kate Louise Elliott		
Hayden Peters		Shane Cortese	Shane Cortese	Shane Cortese	Shane Cortese	Shane Cortese
Lloyd Draper		Scott Harding	Scott Harding	Scott Harding	Scott Harding	Scott Harding
Jools		Holly Shanahan				
Aurora Bay		Claire Chitham	Claire Chitham			
Tyson		Ben Barrington	Ben Barrington			
Dr. Bruce Khan		Jacob Rajan	Jacob Rajan			
Graeme Harkness (Note: Spelt "Graham" in the credits, but "Graeme" in Outrageous Fortune: The Movie and on the official website.)		Nick Kemplen			Nick Kemplen	
Gary Savage			Aaron Jeffery			
Treena			Debbie Newby			
Des Stewart			Greg Johnson			Greg Johnson
Aaron Spiller			Wesley Dowdell	Wesley Dowdell	Wesley Dowdell	Wesley Dowdell
The Gooch			Karl Willetts	Karl Willetts	Karl Willetts	Karl Willetts
Danielle			Sara Wiseman	Sara Wiseman		
Ngaire West			Elizabeth Hawthorne	Elizabeth Hawthorne	Elizabeth Hawthorne	Elizabeth Hawthorne
Sheree Greegan			Tyler-Jane Mitchel	Tyler-Jane Mitchel	Tyler-Jane Mitchel	Tyler-Jane Mitchel
Jane West				Stella King	Stella King	Stella King
Nicky Greegan				Craig Hall	Craig Hall	Craig Hall
Bilkey van der Heever				Jon Brazier	Jon Brazier	
Dane Harris				Barnie Duncan	Barnie Duncan	
Zane Gerard					Charles Mesure	Charles Mesure
Nadine Kronk					Sarah Walden	
Angel					Hori Ahipene	Hori Ahipene
Deleesha Judd					Dominique Crawford	
Isaac Anesi					Pua Magasiva	
Biley Wilson						Sophie Henderson
Chastity						Megan Corbett
Hemi Mason						Kruze Kelly
Elena West						Brooke Williams
Roy Smedley						Sydney Jackson

== Main cast and characters ==
=== Cheryl West ===
Cheryl West
- Outrageous Fortune character
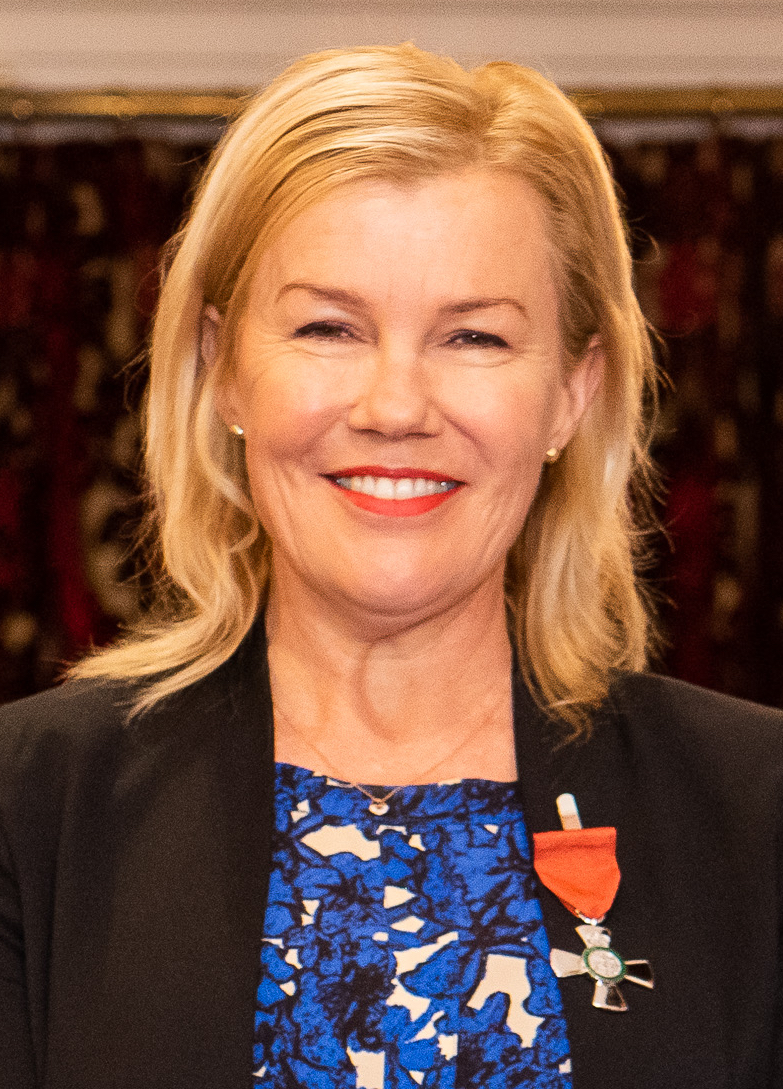
- First appearance: "Slings and Arrows"; Outrageous Fortune; 2005
- Created by: James Griffin; Rachel Lang
- Portrayed by: Robyn Malcolm

In-universe information
- Full name: Cheryl Marie West
- Occupation: Cashier (2005); Accountant (2005); Manager (2005–2010)
- Family: Ted West (ex-father-in-law); Gary Savage (ex-brother in law)
- Spouse: Wolfgang West (ex-husband)
- Significant other: Wayne Judd (ex-love interest)
- Children: Helena West (daughter, deceased); Van West (son); Jethro West (son); Pascalle West (daughter); Loretta West (daughter); Tama Judd (son, deceased)
- Relatives: Dave Miller (father); Trish Miller (mother); Jeanette Miller (sister); Mandy Miller (sister); Jasmine Hong (granddaughter); Xavier Hong (grandson); Jane West (granddaughter)

Cheryl West (Robyn Malcolm) is married to Wolfgang West, and in her early or mid forties. She is the mother of Van, Jethro, Pascalle and Loretta, and later becomes the grandmother and adoptive guardian of Jane. After Wolf is sent to prison early in series 1, Cheryl decides that she and the rest of the family will 'go straight'. After several short term stints working for other people, she and her friend Kasey start the Hoochie Mama lingerie firm. Cheryl runs the business until series 5, when she hands it over to Jethro. During series 1 she enters into a relationship with Wayne Judd, who at that time is a police detective. The relationship is initially secret, but Cheryl later leaves Wolf for Judd. She falls pregnant with Judd's child in series 4, but the baby is stillborn. At the end of series 5, Cheryl accidentally stabs D.S. Zane Gerard with a broken bottle as he arrests Pascalle. Gerard dies from his injuries and Cheryl is charged with murder and jailed. While she is in prison, Judd breaks up with her because he has fallen in love with Pascalle. In the second to last episode, Cheryl walks free after the police drop the murder charges, due to Gerard's dodgy past.

=== Wolfgang West ===
Wolfgang "Wolf" West (Grant Bowler) is a career criminal in his forties, and the patriarch of the West family. He is married to Cheryl West when the show begins. Wolf has four children with her: Jethro, Van, Pascalle, and Loretta. He also has an illegitimate teenage son, whom Pascalle slept with during her promiscuous years, and a deceased infant daughter with Cheryl. At the start of series 1 he is sentenced to prison for four years, provoking Cheryl into trying to turn the family away from crime. In series 2 he is released on home detention after Jethro finds evidence that Judd had planted some evidence. Wolf walked out on his family halfway through series 2 due to Cheryl's affair with Judd, plus the fallout from the robbery of some motorbike gangs, but ended up coming back at the end of series 3. At the end of series 3 and during series 4 he had a relationship with Sheree Greegan, but at the end of series 4 he dumps her to go back to Cheryl, who rejects him. He leaves the country and in series 6 is revealed to be in Perth, Australia with his brother, Gary Savage. Throughout the show he opposes Cheryl's plan for the family to 'go straight' and repeatedly tries to get his sons (but not his daughters) involved in his criminal enterprises. All the West children look up to Wolf to some extent, although less so as the show progresses.

=== Van West ===
Van West (Antony Starr) is the twin brother of Jethro West, and is approximately 20 when the show begins. He is of below-average intelligence, which his family attribute to his being trapped in a freezer during a childhood game of hide and seek. Despite his simple ways, Van is shown to be very caring and fiercely loyal to those whom he loves. He is best friends with Munter, and the two start Tool Guys, a handyman business, together. He is also Munter's best man at his wedding to Kasey. In series 1 Van gets engaged to Draska Doslic, but she changes her mind and runs away from the wedding. In series 2 he reunites with his childhood sweetheart Aurora Bay and they become engaged, but she is then killed in a motorbike accident. Van becomes extremely depressed and gets back together with Draska. He later dates his father's ex-girlfriend Sheree Greegan, until she attempts to kill him by staging a house fire, and leaves the country. He believes himself to be the father of her twins. In series 6 he falls in love, and in the finale marries, Elena, a Russian girl he met while doing a course at Unitec.

=== Jethro West ===
Jethro West (Antony Starr) is the twin brother of Van West, and is approximately 20 at when the show begins. Unlike his twin, he is highly intelligent and also very unscrupulous. In the first episode he graduates from law school, and he works as a lawyer for several series', first for a large firm and then on his own. Subsequently, he embarks on various entrepreneurial schemes, often of dubious morality and legality. These include legal party pills, property development, and Hoochie Mama, the lingerie firm originally owned by his mother. He has had a series of one-night stands and relationships, several of them with women who his brother has also been involved with (one time simultaneously by the woman's request). He is probably also the biological father of Sheree's twins. Early in the show, Cheryl is particularly proud of Jethro as she believes he has rejected his father's criminal ways. However she is heartbroken when it is revealed that in fact Jethro has only become a lawyer in order to be a more effective criminal.

=== Pascalle West ===
Pascalle West (Siobhan Marshall) is Cheryl and Wolf West's oldest daughter. Pascalle is in her late teens when the show begins. In series 1 her ambition is to become a model like her hero Rachel Hunter. She manages to get some modelling work and also a degree of fame after having an affair with a local celebrity. In series 2 she is sentenced to community service at a retirement home after being caught shoplifting. The experience of looking after the elderly makes her less shallow and gives her a positive new age philosophy. While at the retirement home, she meets and becomes engaged to Dr. Bruce Khan. She tells him she is a virgin, when in fact she has been quite promiscuous. She agrees to star in a pornographic movie directed by Loretta in order to raise money to have hymen restoration surgery. However Bruce sees the movie (which has been edited to be more graphic than Pascalle wanted) and he dumps her. She then makes a series of internet videos about positive thinking, which are seen by American millionaire Milt Delaney, who she marries. Early in series 4 Milt has a heart attack and dies, making Pascalle a rich widow. She uses the money to start up a company selling 'the best bag ever'. The money attracts Loretta's boyfriend Nicky Greegan, who dumps Loretta for Pascalle. They become engaged, but Pascalle dumps Nicky after his sister Sheree defrauds Pascalle's company, putting her out of business. Pascalle becomes involved with Nicky's nemesis, D.S. Zane Gerard. After Nicky confesses to bank robbery in order to free Ted, Pascalle takes him back. Gerard begins harassing Pascalle and her family. At the end of series 5, this culminates in a raid on the West house in which Cheryl stabs Gerard and Gerard shoots Pascalle. Nicky escapes from prison and tries to persuade Pascalle to elope with him, but after an armed stand-off she refuses. Later in series 6 she falls in love with Judd and the two start an affair. At the end of the final series she leaves to be with him.

=== Loretta West ===
Loretta West (Antonia Prebble), born in 1991, is the youngest daughter of Cheryl and Wolf West. She is very cynical and has no obvious moral compass until the final series. Her lack of morality is shown in acts such as allowing her best friend Kurt to be arrested for DVD piracy which she had in fact committed (against his protests), and her attempts to sell her daughter Jane. Jane was the result of an accidental pregnancy which Loretta was unaware of until it was too late for her to have an abortion. Cheryl adopted Jane after foiling Loretta's attempts to sell her, but Loretta and Jane's father Hayden subsequently took on shared parenting. While Cheryl was in prison in series 6, Loretta and Hayden were Jane's primary caregivers, and the experience of motherhood seems to have softened and humanised Loretta, making her generally more considerate of others. Loretta owns or runs a string of small businesses over the course of the show, including a video store, a cleaning company, the Tool Guys, a legal party pill business, and a brothel. Towards the end of the series it is suggested that she has become like Cheryl.

=== Theodore West ===
Theodore "Ted" West (Frank Whitten) is Wolf's elderly father, but in series 3 it is revealed that Wolf's mother Rita had cheated on him and Wolf might not be his son. Ted continues to live with the Wests after the revelation, and even after Wolf disappears from the picture, partly because Ted owns the house they all live in. Ted is a skilled safe cracker, and although mostly retired he still occasionally does 'jobs' for friends and family. Although he is a career criminal, Ted has a very strict moral code, which puts loyalty to family and friends above everything else, and forbids informing on anyone or pleading guilty to anything. He initially hated Judd, partly because Judd was a police officer but also because of Judd's involvement with Cheryl and Wolf's marriage breakup. However, when Wolf found a new partner (Sheree), Ted felt Wolf had betrayed the family and subsequently bonded with Judd. Ted then worked for Judd's security firm. When Judd fell in love with Pascalle, Ted began hating him again. In the first two series' it was believed that Ted had Alzheimer's disease, but this was then revealed to be a brain tumor, which was surgically removed. In series 4 Ted marries Ngaire Munroe, the widow of one of Ted's old criminal associates, Lefty.

=== Wayne Judd ===
Wayne Judd (Kirk Torrance) (recurring series' 1–4) was initially a Detective Sergeant in the police force and primary antagonist of the show, who regularly investigated crimes in which the West family were suspected of involvement. He is in his forties. He fell in love with Cheryl in series 1, and ended up leaving the police force due to that. By series 3 they were partners. After leaving the police he worked as a private investigator in his own firm. Cheryl gave birth to his baby in series 5, only to have it die at birth. This and Cheryl's imprisonment in series 6 caused their relationship to suffer, and Judd fell in love with Pascalle. In the series final, they both leave town together.

== Recurring and notable cast and characters ==
=== Eric Grady ===
Eric Grady (Brian Sergent) is a long-time friend of the West family and one of Wolf's partners in crime. He is extremely sleazy and persistently attempts to sleep with Cheryl. He disappeared into hiding after series 2, due to Judd's ex-wife and cop Monica lying to him that she had told everyone he was a nark. He returned in series 5, and revealed that he had been hiding in Palmerston North, until he had come across Monica again there, who told him the truth to get back at Wayne and the Wests. In series 6 he becomes Van's flatmate.

=== Jared Mason ===
Jared "Munter" Mason (Tammy Davis) is Van West's best friend, and the husband of Kasey. Munter has been considered as part of the West family since primary school. Most of the West children refer to him as their half-brother, while Cheryl considers him as one of her children. He is a Tool Guy with Van, and helped him to start up the business. He was thought to be infertile for a short period, but Kasey since became pregnant and gave birth to their son, Hemi, in series 6.

=== Caroline Darling ===
Caroline Darling (Katrina Browne) is the deputy principal at Shadbolt High School, where as a teacher she had a relationship with Jethro while he was still her student. Loretta found out about this and blackmailed her into allowing her to wag school. Her relationship with Jethro ends when he dates Tracy Hong. In season 2 she’s pressured by Loretta to expel her.

=== Glen Hickey ===
Glen Hickey (Rohan Glynn) Judd’s studious former partner who became obsessed with Pascalle West and stalked her. Last seen at the end of season 3 when Judd convinces him to release Munter whom he arrested for drug possession.

=== Kurt ===
Kurt (Dane Dawson) is Loretta West's best friend, She allowed him to be arrested for DVD piracy, which she had in fact committed.

=== Tracy Hong ===
Tracy Hong (Michelle Ang) was a love interest for both Van and Jethro West, and daughter of Mr. Hong. Bought into Hoochie Mama, then left town and dumps her boyfriend Jethro after seeing him strike his mother.

=== Mr. Hong ===
Mr. Hong (Trevor Sai Louie) was Van's employer at Lucky Dollar, after Van robbed his house.

=== Franklin Corke ===
Franklin "Corky" Corke (Jason Hoyte) Wolf's lawyer.

=== Suzy Hong ===
Suzy Hong (Josephine Davison) is one of Van West's many lovers, she has an affair with him while he is working for her husband. Van fathers their daughter, Jasmine, though Mr. Hong believes the baby to be his own.

=== Draska Doslic ===
Draska Doslic (Aidee Walker) was Pascalle's best friend, and become Van's fiancée. In the series 1 final, she changes her mind about the marriage and runs off, partly because Loretta bribes her to leave. After Aurora's death, Draska returns and she and Van get back together. She fakes a pregnancy in order to keep him, but Cheryl and Munter expose her. She reappears in series 6 as one of Cheryl's fellow inmates. The two initially come into conflict but then become cellmates and friends.

=== Rochelle Stephens ===
Rochelle Stephens (Roz Turnbull) is Cheryl and Kasey's best friend, and has 2 children with Lloyd.

=== Barry Gibbs ===
Barry "Sparky" Gibbs (John Leigh) is an electrician, pyromaniac and associate of the West family, who sporadically turns up – usually to cause trouble. He is an old friend of Wolf's, and trusts him implicitly. In series 5 he is sent to prison for kidnapping, eventually breaking out. In series 6 he returns as a "reformed" parking warden forced to join Ted's "crew".

=== Falani ===
Falani (David Fane) is a Samoan friend of the Wests and one of Wolf's partners in crime, with his specialty being the fencing of stolen goods. He lives in fear of his never-seen wife, known only as Mrs. Falani.

=== Kasey Mason ===
Kasey Mason (Nicole Whippy) is of the original owners of the lingerie business, Hoochie Mama, and the wife of Munter. She briefly dated Dane Harris after Munter and her separated, because they cheated on one another. However they got back together and Kasey became pregnant with their first child, even though Munter was previously thought to be infertile. Had a lesbian affair with an Inland Revenue inspector to try to keep her off Hoochie's case, after they staged a number of invisible parties to launder money through the business. In series 6 she and Munter welcomed a son, Hemi. She currently works for Hoochie Mama again and their new debt collecting company "Booty Call".

=== Hayden Peters ===
Hayden Peters (Shane Cortese) previously dated Pascalle for a short period, before moving on to Loretta. The relationship with Loretta ended over the pornography movie they made together and Hayden moved to Australia, after she burned down his house. He returned towards the end of series 4 to start being a father figure to his daughter Jane, whom Loretta gave birth to in the series 3 final. He is in the party pill business with Jethro, and marries Loretta in the series 5 final, supposedly so that they could fairly fight for shared custody of their daughter Jane. In series 6 he reveals that he is broke. He starts up a business with Ted and Ngaire and then begins working with Loretta to run her prostitutes at a brothel named Loretta's.

=== Jane West ===
Jane West (Stella King) is Loretta's daughter with Hayden, who was adopted by Cheryl when Loretta chose not to look after her.

=== Lloyd Draper ===
Lloyd Draper (Scott Harding) a bank manager who tried and failed to lend money to various members of the West family. He later became a marriage celebrant and officiated most of the show's weddings. In series 4 he began a relationship with Cheryl and Kasey's good friend and business partner, Rochelle Stephens, and also left his bank after it was robbed by Loretta and Nicky. He then started a microgreens company funded by a loan from Pascalle.

=== Monica Judd ===
Monica Judd (Kate Louise Elliott) is Wayne's ex-wife. A detective who despises the West family, due to Wayne's involvement with Cheryl. Moves down to Palmerston North after series 4.

=== Jools ===
Jools (Holly Shanahan) a homeless girl who strongly resembles Loretta. In series 2 after Loretta is expelled from Shadbolt high school and transferred to Saint Mary Ignatius Catholic girls' school, Jools secretly takes her place of enrolment. She creates a short film in Loretta’s name that hints she was sexually violated as a child. This causes Cheryl to believe Loretta was the victim. After graduating, she moves down to Wellington having been offered a job from Peter Jackson, much to Loretta’s dismay.

=== Aurora Bay ===
Aurora Bay (Claire Chitham) was Van's high-school sweetheart, but she disappeared from his life after Jethro pretended to be Van in order to sleep with her. In series 2 she reappears as the girlfriend of a gang member. Van rescues her and the two become engaged, but she is tragically killed in a motorbike accident before their wedding.

=== Tyson ===
Tyson (Ben Barrington) is a gang member and was Aurora Bay's boyfriend.

=== Dr. Bruce Khan ===
Dr. Bruce Khan (Jacob Rajan) Pascalle’s fiancé who dumps her in series 3 after seeing her edited porn film.

=== Graeme Harkness ===
Ranger Graeme Harkness (Nick Kemplen) first appears in the Christmas television film. He looks after the Tutaekuri Bay camping area that the Wests stay at each summer and is in constant conflict with them. Loretta develops a crush on him and they have a fling. He reappears in series 5 and he and Loretta have a short-term relationship before she breaks up with him.

=== Gary Savage ===
Gary Savage (Aaron Jeffery) is Wolf's half-brother, from an affair his mother, Rita had with a young neighbour, Vern Gardiner, while Ted was in prison for a botched robbery of department store, Smith & Caughey's. He is a businessman and property developer who employed Jethro as his lawyer. He offered Wolf a business contract for earth moving in diggers. He leaves the country and in series 6 is revealed to be in Australia with his brother, Wolf.

=== Aaron Spiller ===
Aaron Spiller (Wesley Dowdell) went to school with Van, Jethro and Munter. He desperately wants to be Van's mate, and was hired by Loretta to be a Tool Guy with Van and Munter. Has an unhealthy obsession with Pascalle, and in series 5 tries his hardest to protect her from the cops. In series 6 he takes a bullet in the ass to protect Pascalle from Sheree.

=== The Gooch ===
The Gooch (Karl Willetts) Aaron Spiller's best mate, a fellow Tool Guy and the only one with any actual competence in the job.

=== Ngaire West ===
Ngaire West (formerly Munroe) (Elizabeth Hawthorne) first appeared in series 3, as an old associate of Ted's. There was no love lost between them at that point, but in series 4 she reappears in Ted's life and the two fell in love, ending up getting married in the final.

=== Sheree Greegan ===
Sheree Greegan (Tyler-Jane Mitchel) is first seen at the end of series 3, as Wolf's girlfriend. However, after many accounts of flirting and attempts of seduction, she and Van got together after Wolf dumped her. She became pregnant with Jethro's twins, and ended up living at the West's. Left town after stealing Pascalle's money, and sold the twins shortly after their birth. In series 6 she returns when her brother Nicky is about to flee the country to Thailand with his fiancé, Pascalle.

=== Nicky Greegan ===
Nicky Greegan (Craig Hall) is Sheree's extremely close younger brother. He was a partner in crime with Wolf, before getting involved with Loretta. The two stage a bank robbery, framing Wolf. With Sheree's encouragement, he then dumps Loretta for Pascalle, because Pascalle is rich and also a nicer person. Pascalle's family tries to break them up, but the two become engaged at the end of series 4. To Sheree's horror, Nicky has fallen in love with Pascalle and is not just after her money. In series 5, Nicky organises a robbery which results in Ted getting arrested. Pascalle finds out and dumps him for Gerard, but after Nicky turns himself in in exchange for Ted's release, she takes him back. In series 6 he escapes and tries to persuade Pascalle to go on the run with her. She nearly does so, but then backs out when she finds out that Sheree is involved. Nicky flees and is probably in South-East Asia with Sheree.

=== Bilkey van der Heever ===
Bilkey van der Heever (Jon Brazier) an old friend of Ted's. Was in the crime business back in the day, and is openly homosexual.

=== Dane Harris ===
Dane Harris (Barnie Duncan) went to school with Van and Munter. Dated Kasey in series 4 while Kasey and Munter were not dating one another anymore. Currently in prison due to amateur robberies of dairies with a scraper. Was Ted's cellmate for a brief period of time.

=== Zane Gerard ===
Detective Sergeant Zane Gerard (Charles Mesure) is a corrupt police detective with an unexplained vendetta against Nicky Greegan. In series 5 he harasses Van and Munter in order to turn Van into an informant on Nicky, even though Van doesn't know anything. He enters into a relationship with Pascalle, who then dumps him to go back to Nicky. In revenge, Gerard stages a raid on the West house and begins to drag Pascalle away. In the series cliffhanger, Cheryl accidentally stabs him with a broken bottle and he fires his gun at her, hitting Pascalle. At the start of series 6 he dies from his injuries and Cheryl is charged with murder. During the series information emerges that Gerard had a history of harassing women and using his police powers inappropriately. In order to avoid this being revealed, the police agree to drop the charges against Cheryl.

=== Nadine Kronk ===
Nadine Kronk (Sarah Walden) was Jethro's best friend at Shadbolt High School. She started the party pill business with Jethro, Hayden, and Loretta and later goes to rehab.

=== Angel ===
Angel (Hori Ahipene) is a transgender call girl, formerly known as Garth Loader. Several years ago Garth married Sheree Greegan and faked his own death in order to get a life insurance payout. He then moved to Australia and became Angel. She first appears on the show in series 5, working for Nicky Greegan's escort agency. After Nicky is imprisoned she begins working for Loretta and Hayden. She also shares a house with Van for a while and has some kind of relationship with Eric.

=== Deleesha Judd ===
Deleesha Judd (Dominique Crawford) is Wayne's younger half sister, who lived with the Wests for a short period of time before running off with her boyfriend Isaac Anesi.

=== Bailey Wilson ===
Bailey Wilson (Sophie Henderson) is Van's lawyer. She managed to get Munter, Pascalle, Falani, Ngaire, Ted and Eric off their charges from the series 5 final. She had a brief fling with Van but he could not handle sharing Bailey with Jethro. She is dating Jethro. Bailey got Cheryl off on her murder charge in the second to last episode.

== Guest stars ==
- Beth Allen
- Teuila Blakely
- Graham Brazier
- John Campbell
- Zoe Cramond
- Geoff Dolan
- Elisabeth Easther
- Adam Gardiner
- Andrew Grainger
- George Henare
- William Johnson
- Andrew Laing
- Dave McArtney
- Benjamin Mitchell
- Mark Mitchinson
- Rachel Nash
- Suzanne Paul
- Toni Potter
- Gabriel Reid
- Greer Robson-Kirk
- Madeleine Sami
- Beryl Te Wiata
- Anton Tennet
- Jeffrey Thomas
- John Tui
- Jared Turner
- Benedict Wall
- Annie Whittle
- Catherine Wilkin
- Roxane Wilson
- Tandi Wright
