= Josephine Davison =

New Zealand actress

- Born: 1973 (age 52–53)
- Occupation: Actress
- Years active: 1992–present
- Notable work: Gina Rossi-Dodds in Shortland Street; Suzy Hong in Outrageous Fortune; Morgana in SPD; Itassis in Mystic Force; Solon in Dino FuryCosmic Fury.

Josephine Davison (born 1973) is a New Zealand actress. She is known for playing Gina Rossi-Dodds in Shortland Street, Suzy Hong in Outrageous Fortune, and Morgana in Power Rangers S.P.D.

== Biography ==
Josephine Davidson was born in 1973. She began her career with three years in the soap opera Shortland Street as cafe owner Gina Rossi (later Gina Rossi-Dodds), a founding member of the show's cast. In 1992, she appeared in the music video of Greg Johnson's song "Isabelle".

She was in the 1997 New Zealand film Topless Women Talk About Their Lives. She appeared on Outrageous Fortune as Triad wife Suzy Hong. She also appeared on City Life (1996-1998) as Aimee, Street Legal (2000) as Lily Alexander, Mataku (2001–2005) as Sally, Secret Agent Men (2003–2004) as Dakota Jones, Orange Roughies (2006–2007) as Jackie, The Almighty Johnsons (2011–2013) as Elisabet, and Westside (2015) as Lois. Writing for The New Zealand Herald, Kerri Jackson said of Davison's career: "When you take a peek at [it] it's like looking at a snapshot of the country's recent television history".

She portrayed the villain Morgana in Power Rangers S.P.D., and voiced Itassis in Power Rangers Mystic Force and Solon in Power Rangers Dino Fury. She appeared several times in both Hercules: The Legendary Journeys and its spinoff Xena: Warrior Princess, each time playing a different role (Ramina, Princess Alexa, Arachne and Amensu in Hercules; Queen Cleopatra and Artemis in Xena).

She has also acted on stage in The Only Child in New Zealand, an adaptation of Henrik Ibsen's Little Eyolf.
