= Holly Shanahan =

New Zealand actress (born 1981)

- Born: 23 November 1981 (age 44); New Zealand
- Occupation: Actress
- Years active: 2003–present

Holly Shanahan (born 23 November 1981) is a New Zealand actress. She is best known for playing Leelee in Power Rangers Mystic Force and Camille in Power Rangers Jungle Fury.

== Early life and career ==
Shanahan grew up in the Taranaki village of Lepperton and attended New Plymouth Girls' High School. She participated in the Sheilah Winn Festival of Shakespeare in Schools, and the New Zealand Schools Shakespeare Production, and from that she was selected to go to the Globe in London as part of the Young Shakespeare Company in 2000. She studied theatre at Victoria University of Wellington.

Shanahan is known for her roles in two entries of the Power Rangers franchise: Power Rangers Mystic Force and Power Rangers Jungle Fury. She also made appearances in television shows The Insiders Guide to Happiness, and Outrageous Fortune. In 2008, she starred in the film, Second Hand Wedding alongside Patrick Wilson, Ryan O'Kane, and Geraldine Brophy. She won a best supporting actress Qantas Film and Television Award for her work in the film. In 2011, she played Detective Constable Caroline Derwent in the mini-series, Underbelly NZ: Land of the Long Green Cloud, which was based on the criminal career of New Zealand drug trafficker Marty Johnstone.

In 2013, Shanahan settled in New Plymouth, where she began working with young performers. She relaunched the West Coast Youth Theatre in 2014 as a way to help young actors enter the arts. She has since continued to appear in TV series and TV movies, and in 2019 she ran Shakespearian acting workshops for drama students.

Shanahan has also appeared on Australian television, with guest appearances in The Doctor Blake Mysteries and Wanted.

== Filmography ==
=== Television ===
Year	Title	Role	Notes
2017	Wanted	Car Rental Agent	Cameo Cast Member
2014	CNT Live!	Miriam Moonstone-Jones	Cameo Cast Member
2013	The Doctor Blake Mysteries	Eadie McIntyre	Cameo Cast Member
2011	Underbelly NZ: Land Of The Long Green Cloud	Detective Constable Caroline Derwent	Main Cast Member (6 Episodes)
2008	Power Rangers Jungle Fury	Camille	32 episodes
2007	Welcome to Paradise	Lucy	
2006	Outrageous Fortune	Jools	Episode: 2.04, "This Two-Fold Force"; Episode: 2.06, "The Affliction of His Love"; Episode: 2.10, "The Indifferent Children of the Earth"; Episode: 2.11, "Get Thee to Bed"; Episode: 2.13, "An Old Man Is Twice a Child"; Episode: 2.14, "Fathers, Mothers, Daughters, Sons"
2006	Power Rangers Mystic Force	Leelee Pimvare	
2004	The Insider's Guide To Happiness	Bride	Episode: 1.01, "Is Happiness an Accident?"

=== Films ===
Year	Title	Role	Notes
2015	True Crime: Venus and Mars	Sandra Garner	TV movie
2015	True Crime: How to Murder Your Wife	Tracey Lee	TV movie
2008	Second Hand Wedding	Cheryl Rose	Won – Qantas a Film Award for Best Supporting Actress
2007	The Last Great Snail Chase	Katie	
2024	The Rule of Jenny Pen	Madeline Shepard	
