= Westside (New Zealand TV series) =

New Zealand comedy-drama television series

- Genre: Comedy drama
- Created by: Rachel Lang; James Griffin
- Directed by: Mark Beesley; Murray Keane; Simon Bennett; Michael Hurst; Aidee Walker; Caroline Bell-Booth; David de Lautour; Josh Frizzell
- Starring: Antonia Prebble; David de Lautour; Dan Musgrove; Esther Stephens; Todd Emerson; Pana Hema-Taylor; Xavier Horan; Sophie Hambleton; Reef Ireland; Ashleigh Cummings; Jessica Grace Smith
- Opening theme: "Watch Your Back" by Hello Sailor (series 1–2)
- Composer: Joel Haines
- Country of origin: New Zealand
- Original language: English
- No. of series: 6
- No. of episodes: 52

Production
- Executive producers: Chris Bailey; Kelly Martin; James Griffin; Andrew Szusterman; Sally Campbell
- Producers: John Laing; Mark Beesley
- Cinematography: Marty Smith; David Paul
- Editors: Bryan Shaw; Gary Hunt; Brough Johnson; Eric de Beus; Allanah Bazzard; Tom Eagles
- Running time: 44–45 minutes
- Production company: South Pacific Pictures

Original release
- Network: Three
- Release: 31 May 2015 – 16 November 2020

Related
- Outrageous Fortune

Westside is a New Zealand comedy drama television series created by Rachel Lang and James Griffin for South Pacific Pictures. It is a prequel to Outrageous Fortune, and chronicles the lives of Ted and Rita West. The show aired from 31 May 2015 to 16 November 2020 on Three, formerly known as TV3.

Series 4 premiered on 9 July 2018. On 21 July 2018 NZ on Air announced funding for a fifth series which will consist of 10 episodes. On 19 July 2019, NZ on Air announced funding for a sixth and final series of Westside.

== Plot ==
The first series is set in the 1970s, it features a Westie couple, and stars Antonia Prebble and David de Lautour as Rita and Ted West. In the first episode, set in 1974, it features John Walker beating Rod Dixon in the 1500 metres at the 1974 Commonwealth Games. Each episode covers one year, from 1974 to 1979, with events like the Muldoon election, dawn raids on overstayers, carless days, and the birth of the punk rock scene in Auckland.

The second series is set in 1981, and follows the Springbok Tour. The series starts with Rita returning home from prison to find the West household in disrepair. Throughout the course of the series Ted's gang plots to steal from the South Africans visiting New Zealand, preventing them from buying land, while Rita plans a job against developer Evan Lace.

The third series is set in 1982 and deals with the fallout from the Evan Lace job and Wolf's first meeting with his future wife, Cheryl.

== Cast and characters ==
This table shows the show's characters and the cast members who have portrayed them.

Note: Only those appearing in more than one episode appear in this list, and only when the actor contributes new material to an episode.

Color key:

Series regular

Appearances

No appearances

Character	Series					
Character	1	2	3	4	5	6
Rita West	Antonia Prebble	Antonia Prebble	Antonia Prebble	Antonia Prebble	Antonia Prebble	Antonia Prebble
Ted West	David de Lautour	David de Lautour	David de Lautour	David de Lautour	David de Lautour	David de Lautour
Lefty Munroe	Dan Musgrove	Dan Musgrove	Dan Musgrove	Dan Musgrove	Dan Musgrove	Dan Musgrove
Ngaire Munroe	Esther Stephens	Esther Stephens	Esther Stephens	Esther Stephens	Esther Stephens	Esther Stephens
Bilkey van Heeder	Todd Emerson	Todd Emerson	Todd Emerson	Todd Emerson	Todd Emerson	Todd Emerson
Bert Thompson	Pana Hema-Taylor	Pana Hema-Taylor	Pana Hema-Taylor	Pana Hema-Taylor	Pana Hema-Taylor	Pana Hema-Taylor
Phineas O'Driscoll	Xavier Horan	Xavier Horan	Xavier Horan	Xavier Horan	Xavier Horan	Xavier Horan
Carol O'Driscoll	Sophie Hambleton	Sophie Hambleton	Sophie Hambleton	Sophie Hambleton	Sophie Hambleton	Sophie Hambleton
Wolf West	Reon Bell; Liam Ferguson	Reef Ireland	Reef Ireland	Reef Ireland	Reef Ireland	Reef Ireland
Cheryl Miller			Ashleigh Cummings	Ashleigh Cummings	Jessica Grace Smith	Jessica Grace Smith
=== Recurring cast ===
Mike McCarthy	Will Hall	Will Hall	Will Hall	Will Hall		
Rod Nugent	Jordan Mauger	Jordan Mauger				
Darijo Doslic	Glen Levy	Glen Levy	Glen Levy	Glen Levy		
Falani	Patrick Tafa	Patrick Tafa	Patrick Tafa	Patrick Tafa	Patrick Tafa	Patrick Tafa
Des McEwen	Joel Tobeck	Joel Tobeck				
Barry "Sparky" Gibbs	Caleb Wells	Caleb Wells	Caleb Wells	Caleb Wells	Caleb Wells	Caleb Wells
Eric Grady	Jordan Mooney	Jordan Mooney	Jordan Mooney	Jordan Mooney	Jordan Mooney	Jordan Mooney
Evan Lace		Dean O'Gorman	Dean O'Gorman			
Joanne		Hannah Marshall				
Belinda Lace		Laura Hill	Laura Hill			
Terry		Tim Carlsen				
Dave		Stelios Yiakmis				
Riana Adams		Kirsten Ibbetson	Kirsten Ibbetson	Kirsten Ibbetson	Kirsten Ibbetson	
Chelsea Munroe		Salomé Grace	Salomé Grace	Salomé Grace		
Lisa Munroe		Ella Shirtcliffe	Ella Shirtcliffe	Ella Shirtcliffe		
Trish Miller			Jodie Dorday	Jodie Dorday		
Jeanette Miller			Jessie Lawrence	Jessie Lawrence		
Mandy Miller			Lily Powell	Lily Powell	Lily Powell	Lily Powell
Danny Peters			Shane Cortese	Shane Cortese		
Hayden Peters			Pierre Beasley	Pierre Beasley		
Theresa Deering			Elizabeth Dowden	Elizabeth Dowden		
Frankie Figgs					Peter Elliott	Peter Elliott
Bianca Figgs					Michelle Langstone	Michelle Langstone
Krystle Figgs					Emily McKenzie	Emily McKenzie
Keith					Jason Wu	Jason Wu
Van and Jethro West						Charlie Grey
Aroha						Piimio Mei

=== Main cast ===
- Antonia Prebble as Rita West, wife of Ted and mother to Wolf. Prebble had previously starred as Rita's granddaughter Loretta West in Outrageous Fortune
- David de Lautour as Theodore "Ted" West, husband of Rita and father to Wolf
- Dan Musgrove as Russell "Lefty" Munroe, husband of Ngaire and father to Desiree, Chelsea and Lisa
- Esther Stephens as Ngaire Munroe, wife of Lefty and mother to Desiree, Chelsea and Lisa
- Todd Emerson as Bjelke "Bilkey" van Heeder
- Pana Hema-Taylor as Bert Thompson
- Xavier Horan as Phineas O'Driscoll, husband of Carol
- Sophie Hambleton as Carol O'Driscoll, wife of Phineas
- Reef Ireland as Wolfgang "Wolf" West (series 2–6), Ted and Rita West's son
- Ashleigh Cummings as Cheryl Miller (series 3–4), Wolf's girlfriend/wife
- Jessica Grace Smith as Cheryl West (series 5–6), Wolf's wife

=== Recurring cast ===
- Will Hall as Mike McArthy; police detective
- Jordan Mauger as Rod Nugent; shady pawn shop owner, Rita blackmails him into signing the Galleria over to her
- Glen Levy as Darijo Doslic; neighbour/associate of the Wests
- Patrick Tafa as Falani; friend of Wolf
- Joel Tobeck as Des McEwen; shady lawyer
- Caleb Wells as Barry "Sparky" Gibbs; friend of Wolf, brother to Annemarie, son of Dougal
- Jordan Mooney as Eric Grady; friend of Wolf
- Dean O'Gorman as Evan Lace; local businessman
- Hannah Marshall as Joanne; Evan's girlfriend
- Laura Hill as Belinda Lace; Evan's wife, was in prison with Rita
- Tim Carlsen as Terry; local constable
- Stelios Yiakmis as Dave; protest group leader
- Kirsten Ibbetson as Riana Adams; student, later cop, dated Bert
- Salomé Grace as Chelsea Munroe; Ngaire & Lefty's middle daughter
- Ella Shirtcliffe as Lisa Munroe; Ngaire & Lefty's youngest daughter
- Jodie Dorday as Trish Miller; Cheryl's mother
- Jessie Lawrence as Jeanette Miller; Cheryl's older sister
- Lily Powell as Mandy Miller; Cheryl's younger sister
- Shane Cortese as Danny Peters; local brothel owner/pimp
- Pierre Beasley as Hayden Peters; Danny's son
- Elizabeth Dowden as Theresa Deering; one of Danny's workers; has a relationship with Lefty

=== Guest cast ===
- Matthew Arbuckle as Shane, local constable, has a crush on Cheryl
- Jarred Blakiston as Vern Gardiner, neighbour of the Wests at their old house, has an affair with Rita, while Ted is in prison
- Ross Brannigan as Father Murphy, Phineas' parish priest
- Alistair Browning as Dieter Szabo, Rita's Nazi father
- Rachale Davies as Jackie, Cheryl's maternal aunt, Trish's sister
- Geoffrey Dolan as Neville, a country farmer, on who Lefty sets up a burglary
- Wesley Dowdell as Dick Spiller, father to Aaron (played Aaron in Outrageous Fortune)
- Peter Elliott as Frankie Figgs, shady businessman and nemesis of the Wests
- David Fane as Ofisa Falani (Senior)
- Eve Gordon as Pat, an old friend of Rita's
- Andrew Grainger as Declan Corke, likely grandfather to Franklin (Outrageous Fortune)
- Taylor Hall as Allen Markham, car dealer
- Jason Hodzelmans as Brian, neighbour of the Wests, Wendy's husband
- Jamie Irvine as Marty Johnstone
- Michelle Langstone as Bianca, daughter of Frankie Figgs and older sister of Krystle
- John Leigh as Dougal Gibbs, an associate of Ted, father to Sparky and Annemarie
- Gabriel McArtney as Captain Hook (Dave McArtney), vocalist/guitarist of Hello Sailor
- Jaime McDermott as Annemarie Gibbs, Sparky's sister and daughter to Dougal
- Laura McGoldrick as Wendy, neighbour of the Wests
- Dra McKay as Elsa Szabo, Rita's mother (Season 4–6)
- Toni Potter as Mary Peters, wife to Danny, mother to Hayden (Season 4)
- Alison Quigan as Old Lady
- John Rawls as Gang Leader, of "The Horsemen" gang Wolf is coerced into joining (Season 2)
- Ilona Rodgers as Grandma Miller, Cheryl's paternal grandmother (Season 4)
- Renee Sheridan as Maureen, Cheryl's maternal aunt, Trish's sister (Season 4)
- Rima Te Wiata as Iris, Ted's bookie (Season 4–6)
- Roz Turnbull as Sonia Stephens, Rochelle's mum (played Rochelle Stephens in Outrageous Fortune) (Season 5)
- Nicole Whippy as Kasey's mum (played Kasey in Outrageous Fortune) (Season 4)
- Scott Wills as Buck, gang member of "The Horsemen" (Season 2)

== Production ==
In July 2014, NZ On Air approved funding of NZ$4.8 million for the miniseries. On 28 July 2015, NZ On Air approved funding of $7.6 million for a second series, on 2 August 2016 $6.6 million was approved for a third series and on 24 July 2017 $6.5 million was approved for a fourth series. In September an additional $1.2 million was approved for series four.

=== Filming ===
Filming for series one commenced on 12 October and concluded on 17 December 2014. Filming for series two commenced on 27 September 2015 and concluded on 19 January 2016. Filming for series three commenced on 30 October 2016 and concluded on 3 February 2017. Filming for series four commenced on 19 November 2017 and concluded on 18 March 2018.

=== Music ===
Westside: The Original Soundtrack

Soundtrack album by Various artists
- Released: 8 July 2015
- Genre: Rock
- Label: South Pacific Pictures

Westside: The Original Soundtrack was released for digital download on 8 July 2015 and CD on 10 July 2015. It peaked at number nineteen in New Zealand. Music from Westside Series Two was released for digital download on 1 July 2016

Westside: The Original Soundtrack
No.	Title	Artist	Length
1.	"Watch Your Back"	Hello Sailor	3:57
2.	"Yesterday Was Just the Beginning of My Life"	Mark Williams	3:29
3.	"Stuff and Nonsense"	Split Enz	4:20
4.	"Ashes and Matches"	Doug Jerebine	3:23
5.	"Lovely Lady"	John Hanlon	3:31
6.	"Rust in My Car"	Citizen Band	3:49
7.	"Bliss"	Th' Dudes	5:00
8.	"Latin Lover"	Hello Sailor	3:04
9.	"Apple Wine"	John Hanlon	3:18
10.	"Another Great Divide"	Split Enz	3:37
11.	"Computer Games"	Mi-Sex	3:53
12.	"Going Steady"	Bitch	3:31
13.	"Good Morning Mr Rock 'n' Roll"	Headband	2:46
14.	"Pretty Girl"	Hogsnort Rupert	3:30
15.	"I Need Your Love"	Golden Harvest	3:50
16.	"Join Together" (Commonwealth Games Theme Song)	Steve Allen	3:01
17.	"Hey Baby"	La De Da's	2:51
18.	"Be Mine Tonight"	Th' Dudes	6:07
19.	"Sunshine" (digital download-only track)	Dragon	4:54
20.	"Voodoo Lady"	Dalvanius	3:44
21.	"Jezebel"	Jon Stevens	3:19
22.	"Are You Old Enough"	Dragon	4:06
23.	"Luck's on Your Table"	Sharon O'Neill	3:13
24.	"Gutter Black"	Hello Sailor	2:53

Music from Westside Series Two
No.	Title	Artist	Length
1.	"Watch Your Back"	Hello Sailor	3:57
2.	"Walking in the Light"	Th'Dudes	3:40
3.	"Sunday Boys"	The Screaming MeeMees	3:45
4.	"Tears"	The Crocodiles	4:02
5.	"Now"	Pop Mechanix	3:03
6.	"Virginia"	Dave McArtney & The Pink Flamingos	2:31
7.	"There Is No Depression in New Zealand"	Blam Blam Blam	3:18
8.	"Auckland Tonight"	The Androids	3:07
9.	"Beings Rest Finally"	Beat Rhythm Fashion	4:49
10.	"Azania (Soon Come)"	Herbs	4:27
11.	"Danny Boy"	Alms for Children	4:38
12.	"Without a Doubt"	Split Enz	5:59
13.	"Kaleidoscope World"	The Chills	3:42
14.	"Billy Bold"	Graham Brazier	3:04
15.	"Riot Squad"	The NewMatics	3:30
16.	"Stop Crying"	Th'Dudes	4:44
17.	"Trendy Lefties"	The Mockers	3:28
18.	"Dragons and Demons"	Herbs	4:38
19.	"Judas"	The NewMatics	4:16
20.	"Taking the Weight Off"	Penknife Glides	4:46
21.	"Don't Fight It Marsha, Its Bigger Than Both of Us"	Blam Blam Blam	3:54
22.	"Doctor I Like Your Medicine"	Coup D'Etat	3:34
23.	"See Me Go"	The Screaming MeeMees	3:40
24.	"Asian Paradise"	Sharon O'Neill	5:06
25.	"Do the Blue Beat"	Dinah Lee	2:05

==== Charts ====
Series 1

Chart (2015)	Peak position
New Zealand Albums (RMNZ)	19

== Release ==
=== Broadcast ===
Series 2 premiered in New Zealand on 12 June 2016 and series 3 premiered on 10 July 2017.

Series 1 premiered in Australia on 9Gem on 2 December 2015, and series 2 premiered on 8 August 2016.

=== Home media ===
Series 1 is available on the iTunes Store in Australia.

Title	Set details	DVD release dates	
Title	Set details	Region 4	
Title	Set details	New Zealand	Australia
Westside — Series One	Discs: 1; Episodes: 6	8 July 2015	3 February 2016
Westside — Series Two	Discs: 1; Episodes: 10	18 August 2016	TBA
Westside — Series Three	Discs: 2; Episodes: 8	30 August 2017	TBA
Westside — Series Four	Discs: 2; Episodes: 10	13 September 2018	TBA
Westside — Series Five	Discs: 2; Episodes: 10	12 September 2019	TBA
Westside — Series Six	Discs: 2; Episodes: 8	19 November 2020	TBA

== Series overview ==
Series	Episodes	Originally released	
Series	Episodes	First released	Last released
1	6	31 May 2015	5 July 2015
2	10	12 June 2016	14 August 2016
3	8	10 July 2017	28 August 2017
4	10	9 July 2018	10 September 2018
5	10	17 June 2019	12 August 2019
6	8	28 September 2020	16 November 2020

=== Episodes ===
==== Series 1 (2015) ====
No. overall	No. in series	Title	Directed by	Written by	Background event	Original release date	N.Z. viewers
1	1	"All That Impedes Thee from the Golden Round"	Mark Beesley	Rachel Lang	1974 British Commonwealth Games	31 May 2015	294,920
2	2	"Is't Far You Ride?"	Mark Beesley	James Griffin	1975 New Zealand general election	7 June 2015	220,650
3	3	"Instruments of Darkness Tell Us Truths"	Murray Keane	Rachel Lang	New Zealand dawn raids	14 June 2015	151,330
4	4	"Our Poison'd Chalice"	Murray Keane	James Griffin	Marty Johnstone ("Mr Asia") drug deals	21 June 2015	224,130
5	5	"Dire Combustion"	Simon Bennett	James Griffin	1978 Bastion Point arrests Punk subculture	28 June 2015	214,780
6	6	"But for a Wayward Son"	Simon Bennett	Rachel Lang	Carless days in New Zealand	5 July 2015	206,190

==== Series 2 (2016) ====
No. overall	No. in series	Title	Directed by	Written by	Original release date	N.Z. viewers
7	1	"Episode 1"	Murray Keane	James Griffin	12 June 2016	N/A
8	2	"Episode 2"	Murray Keane	James Griffin	19 June 2016	N/A
9	3	"Episode 3"	Michael Hurst	Kate McDermott	26 June 2016	N/A
10	4	"Episode 4"	Michael Hurst	James Griffin	3 July 2016	N/A
11	5	"Episode 5"	Murray Keane	Rachel Lang	10 July 2016	N/A
12	6	"Episode 6"	Murray Keane	John Daniell & James Griffin	17 July 2016	N/A
13	7	"Episode 7"	Michael Hurst	Michael Beran & James Griffin	24 July 2016	162,900
14	8	"Episode 8"	Michael Hurst	Kate McDermott	31 July 2016	N/A
15	9	"Episode 9"	Murray Keane	Nick Ward & James Griffin	7 August 2016	N/A
16	10	"Episode 10"	Murray Keane	James Griffin	14 August 2016	N/A

==== Series 3 (2017) ====
No. overall	No. in series	Title	Directed by	Written by	Original release date	N.Z. viewers
17	1	"Episode 1"	Murray Keane	Kate McDermott	10 July 2017	200,000
18	2	"Episode 2"	Murray Keane	James Griffin	17 July 2017	141,000
19	3	"Episode 3"	Michael Hurst	James Griffin	24 July 2017	203,000
20	4	"Episode 4"	Michael Hurst	Kate McDermott	31 July 2017	N/A
21	5	"Episode 5"	Murray Keane	Shoshana McCallum	8 August 2017	N/A
22	6	"Episode 6"	Murray Keane	Shoshana McCallum & James Griffin	14 August 2017	N/A
23	7	"Episode 7"	Michael Hurst	Nick Ward	21 August 2017	N/A
24	8	"Episode 8"	Michael Hurst	James Griffin	28 August 2017	184,300

==== Series 4 (2018) ====
No. overall	No. in series	Title	Directed by	Written by	Original release date	N.Z. viewers
25	1	"Episode 1"	Murray Keane	James Griffin	9 July 2018	N/A
26	2	"Episode 2"	Murray Keane	Kate McDermott	16 July 2018	N/A
27	3	"Episode 3"	Murray Keane	Shoshana McCallum	23 July 2018	N/A
28	4	"Episode 4"	Murray Keane	Dan Musgrove	30 July 2018	N/A
29	5	"Episode 5"	Aidee Walker	Shoshana McCallum	6 August 2018	N/A
30	6	"Episode 6"	Aidee Walker & Michael Hurst	James Griffin	13 August 2018	N/A
31	7	"Episode 7"	Caroline Bell-Booth	Dan Musgrove	20 August 2018	N/A
32	8	"Episode 8"	Michael Hurst	Kate McDermott	27 August 2018	N/A
33	9	"Episode 9"	Caroline Bell-Booth	Nick Ward & James Griffin	3 September 2018	N/A
34	10	"Episode 10"	Michael Hurst	James Griffin	10 September 2018	N/A

==== Series 5 (2019) ====
No. overall	No. in series	Title	Directed by	Written by	Original release date	N.Z. viewers
35	1	"Episode 1"	Caroline Bell-Booth	James Griffin	17 June 2019	N/A
36	2	"Episode 2"	Caroline Bell-Booth	Kate McDermott	24 June 2019	N/A
37	3	"Episode 3"	David de Lautour	Dan Musgrove & James Griffin	1 July 2019	N/A
38	4	"Episode 4"	David de Lautour	Shoshana McCallum	8 July 2019	N/A
39	5	"Episode 5"	Michael Hurst	Kate McDermott	15 July 2019	N/A
40	6	"Episode 6"	Michael Hurst	James Griffin	22 July 2019	N/A
41	7	"Episode 7"	Aidee Walker	James Griffin	29 July 2019	N/A
42	8	"Episode 8"	Aidee Walker	Shoshana McCallum & James Griffin	5 August 2019	N/A
43	9	"Episode 9"	Michael Hurst	Dan Musgrove & James Griffin	12 August 2019	N/A
44	10	"Episode 10"	Michael Hurst	Kate McDermott & James Griffin	12 August 2019	N/A

==== Series 6 (2020) ====
No. overall	No. in series	Title	Directed by	Written by	Original release date
45	1	"Her Grave, While I'm Dancing on It"	Caroline Bell-Booth	James Griffin	28 September 2020
46	2	"Making the Most of Every Moment"	Caroline Bell-Booth	Kate McDermott	5 October 2020
47	3	"Behold – The Miracle Water!"	Josh Frizzell	Shoshana McCallum	12 October 2020
48	4	"Well That's Not Creepy"	Josh Frizzell	James Griffin	19 October 2020
49	5	"Otherwise Evil Wins"	Caroline Bell-Booth	James Griffin	26 October 2020
50	6	"Just a Random Act of Violence"	Caroline Bell-Booth	Dan Musgrove	2 November 2020
51	7	"How’d You Like the Quiche, Frankie?"	Murray Keane	Kate McDermott	9 November 2020
52	8	"Tell You What Girl, You've Got Your Work Cut Out for You"	Murray Keane	James Griffin	16 November 2020

== Awards and nominations ==
=== C21's International Drama Awards ===
Year	Category	Nominee	Result	Ref
2017	Best Returning Drama Series	Westside	Nominated	

=== New York Festivals International Film & TV Awards ===
Year	Award	Category	Nominee	Result	Ref
2018	Bronze World Medal	Television – Entertainment Program: Drama	Mark Beesley, James Griffin, Chris Bailey, Kelly Martin, Murray Keane and Michael Hurst	Won	
2019	Silver World Medal	Television – Entertainment Program: Drama	Mark Beesley, James Griffin, Chris Bailey, Kelly Martin	Won	
2020	Finalist	Television – Entertainment Program: Drama	Mark Beesley, James Griffin, Chris Bailey, Kelly Martin	Won	

=== New Zealand Television Awards ===
Year	Category	Nominee	Result	Ref
2017	Best Drama Series	Mark Beesley, Kelly Martin, Chris Bailey & James Griffin	Nominated	
2017	Best Actress	Antonia Prebble	Nominated	
2017	Best Actress	Esther Stephens	Nominated	
2018	Best Art Direction or Production Design	Clayton Ercolano	Nominated	
2018	Best Script: Drama	James Griffin	Nominated	
2018	Best Drama Series	Mark Beesley, Chris Bailey, Kelly Martin, James Griffin	Won	
2018	Screen Auckland Best Director: Drama	Michael Hurst	Nominated	
2018	Best Actress	Antonia Prebble	Won	
2019	Best Drama Series	Mark Beesley, Kelly Martin, Chris Bailey, James Griffin	Won	
2020	Best Actress	Antonia Prebble	Pending	
2020	Best Editing: Drama	Eric de Beus	Pending	
2020	Best Costume Design	Tania Klouwens	Pending	
2020	Best Makeup Design	Vanessa Hurley	Pending	
2020	Best Script: Drama	James Griffin and Kate McDermott for Season 5, Episode 10	Pending	

=== New Zealand Television Craft Awards ===
Year	Category	Nominee	Result	Ref
2017	Best Editing: Drama	Allanah Bazzard	Nominated	
2017	Best Contribution to a Soundtrack	Steve Finnigan, Alan Kidd, Mike Bayliss, Carl Smith	Nominated	
