= List of Outrageous Fortune episodes =

Outrageous Fortune is a New Zealand comedy-drama television series that premiered on 12 July 2005 and concluded on 9 November 2010 on TV3 in New Zealand. 107 episodes of Outrageous Fortune aired over the course of six series. All six series have been released on DVD in Region 4.

The series follows the lives of the Wests, a family of petty criminals living in West Auckland, New Zealand. Mother Cheryl (Robyn Malcolm) is the family matriarch, desperately trying to keep her family out of trouble, who decides to put an end to their criminal ways and become respectable citizens, when her husband Wolf (Grant Bowler) is sent to jail for four years. This is met with much resistance from twin sons Van and Jethro (Antony Starr), older daughter Pascalle (Siobhan Marshall), younger daughter Loretta (Antonia Prebble), and father-in-law Ted (Frank Whitten).

Each episode title is a quotation from Hamlet.

== Series overview ==
Series	Episodes	Originally released	
Series	Episodes	First released	Last released
1	13	12 July 2005	4 October 2005
2	16	5 September 2006	19 December 2006
Special		26 December 2006	
3	22	17 July 2007	11 December 2007
4	18	17 June 2008	14 October 2008
5	19	2 June 2009	6 October 2009
6	18	13 July 2010	9 November 2010

== Episode list ==
=== Series 1 (2005) ===
The first series opens with the introduction of the Wests, known far and wide as a small-time crime family. When patriarch Wolf is sent to prison for four years, his wife Cheryl decides that she wants better for her children and tells the family that they're all going legit from now on. However, she finds that it's not easy making an honest buck in this world, and the rest of the family must fight their natural instincts to stay on the straight and narrow, especially when Wolf is still pulling the strings from inside.

No. overall	No. in series	Title	Directed by	Written by	Original release date
1	1	"Slings and Arrows"	Vanessa Alexander	James Griffin	12 July 2005
When Cheryl's husband Wolf is sentenced to prison, she declares that the West family is out of the crime business for good.
2	2	"The Rub"	Vanessa Alexander	James Griffin	19 July 2005
Van ends up working for the Hong family to pay off his debts. Pascalle is forced to get a job, and Cheryl sticks up for her coworkers.
3	3	"A Little More Than Kin"	Mark Beesley	James Griffin	26 July 2005
Pascalle has a new career, Jethro lies about having Māori heritage and Cheryl receives some undesired attention.
4	4	"The Cause of This Defect"	Mark Beesley	James Griffin	8 August 2005
Wolf is on day release from prison to attend a funeral, and all hell breaks loose for the West family.
5	5	"The Infants of Spring"	Mark Beesley	James Griffin	9 August 2005
As Cheryl starts to realise that going straight it harder than it looks, the family tries to help out in the only way they know how.
6	6	"But Never Doubt I Love"	Mark Beesley	James Griffin	16 August 2005
Pascalle realises she has a secret admirer, while Grandpa finds love.
7	7	"Foul Deeds Will Rise"	Jonathan Brough	James Griffin	23 August 2005
Loretta has to attend school again; Jethro and Caroline (Katrina Browne) announce themselves as a couple, while Grandpa says he is moving away with Margaret (Jane Collins).
8	8	"My Dearest Foe"	Jonathan Brough	James Griffin	30 August 2005
Pascalle discovers all is not beautiful in the modeling world, Grandpa takes up poker and Cheryl has yet another job.
9	9	"When the Blood Burns"	Michael Bennett	Maxine Fleming	6 September 2005
10	10	"The Fat Weed That Roots Itself"	Michael Bennett	James Griffin	13 September 2005
11	11	"It Cannot Come to Good"	Jonathan Brough	James Griffin	20 September 2005
The crime of the century, Van West style; Cheryl is the victim of rumor and innuendo; and Pascalle gets a taste of fame.
12	12	"To Be Honest as This World Goes"	Jonathan Brough	Maxine Fleming and James Griffin	27 September 2005
In the fallout from the Tongan job, Van's having problems with the woman in his life; Cheryl's having problems with the men in hers; and Wolf is presented with a 'Get Out of Jail' ticket.
13	13	"Go, Bid the Soldiers Shoot"	Mark Beesley	James Griffin	4 October 2005
Van and Draska (Aidee Walker) are kicked out of the Doslic family home and are also on the run from the law. Despite this, Draska is still determined to carry on with the wedding and enlists Pascalle as her bridesmaid. Cheryl has bottomed out but finds Judd may be Van's saviour.

=== Series 2 (2006) ===
The second series picks up the story of the West family and their attempts to stay out of trouble, but one major thing has changed: Wolf is out of prison and on home detention. And he, for one, never bought into Cheryl's grand plan for his family. Cheryl must deal with constant opposition from her husband Wolf to stay straight. Although she deals with the occasional temptation to veer from her chosen path, Cheryl leads by example and tries to keep her family on the same track.

No. overall	No. in series	Title	Directed by	Written by	Original release date	N.Z. viewers (thousand)
14	1	"Thy Name Is Woman"	Simon Bennett	Rachel Lang	5 September 2006	188.30
15	3	"Think Yourself a Baby"	Simon Bennett	Tim Balme	12 September 2006	N/A
16	3	"The Secrets of My Prison House"	Simon Bennett	James Griffin	19 September 2006	N/A
17	4	"This Two-Fold Force"	Simon Bennett	Rachel Lang	26 September 2006	N/A
18	5	"Shall We to the Court?"	Mark Beesley	Tim Balme	3 October 2006	N/A
19	6	"The Affliction of His Love"	Mark Beesley	James Griffin	10 October 2006	N/A
20	7	"All That Fortune, Death and Danger Dare"	Mark Beesley	Jan Prettejohns	17 October 2006	N/A
21	8	"The Steep and Thorny Way to Heaven"	Mark Beesley	Nick Ward and James Griffin	24 October 2006	N/A
22	9	"To Be, Or Not to Be"	Murray Keane	Michael Bennett	31 October 2006	N/A
23	10	"The Indifferent Children of the Earth"	Murray Keane	Rachel Lang	7 November 2006	N/A
24	11	"Get Thee to Bed"	Mark Beesley	James Griffin	14 November 2006	N/A
25	12	"By a Brother's Hand"	Mark Beesley	Tim Balme and James Griffin	21 November 2006	N/A
26	13	"An Old Man Is Twice a Child"	Murray Keane	Gavin Strawhan and James Griffin	28 November 2006	N/A
27	14	"Fathers, Mothers, Daughters, Sons"	Murray Keane	Kate McDermott	5 December 2006	N/A
28	15	"O God!"	Simon Bennett	James Griffin	12 December 2006	N/A
29	16	"Now Cracks a Noble Heart"	Simon Bennett	Rachel Lang	19 December 2006	N/A

=== Special (2006) ===
No. overall	No. in series	Title	Directed by	Written by	Original release date
30	17	"Wherein Our Saviour's Birth Is Celebrated" "Outrageous Fortune: The Movie"	Mark Beesley	James Griffin	26 December 2006
Wolf's in prison to stay, Judd's in prison and trying to get out. The family goes to Tutaekuri Bay for their annual summer holiday.

=== Series 3 (2007) ===
The third series sees West family matriarch Cheryl still battling to keep her family (and herself) on the straight and narrow. Both the men in her life are inside, Wolf, after turning himself into the cops as part of his master plan to frame Judd; Judd, because he fell in love with the wrong woman. As Cheryl ploughs on regardless, balancing the needs of family with those of Hoochie Mama, her burgeoning naughty knicker business, her offspring are going their own merry ways. Van is still managing the Lucky Dollar Store and planning his dream wedding with Aurora Bay (Claire Chitham). Jethro is branching out from defending the scum of the Earth (and his family) to working for property developer Gary Savage (Aaron Jeffery). Pascalle is enthusiastically embracing both her new-found vocation in caring for the elderly and her new-found love for Dr. Bruce Khan (Jacob Rajan). Loretta is happily ensconced with her older man, Hayden Peters (Shane Cortese), and is gleefully plotting her directorial debut, helming the next great erotic film, especially for women.

No. overall	No. in series	Title	Directed by	Written by	Original release date	N.Z. viewers (thousand)
31	1	"What Loss Your Honour May Sustain"	Mark Beesley	James Griffin	17 July 2007	465.20
32	2	"While the Grass Grows"	Mark Beesley	Tim Balme, James Griffin and Rachel Lang	24 July 2007	N/A
33	3	"Most True, She Is a Strumpet"	Rachel Lang	Simon Bennett	31 July 2007	N/A
34	4	"Contagious Blastments"	Simon Bennett	Rachel Lang	7 August 2007	N/A
35	5	"What Did You Enact?"	Michael Bennett	James Griffin	14 August 2007	N/A
36	6	"Put the Strong Law on Him"	Michael Bennett	Tim Balme	21 August 2007	N/A
37	7	"I Dare Damnation"	Britta Johnstone	Jan Prettejohns and James Griffin	28 August 2007	N/A
38	8	"Oh Horrible! Most Horrible!"	Britta Johnstone	Kate McDermott and Rachel Lang	4 September 2007	N/A
39	9	"No Noble Rite"	Murray Keane	Fiona Samuel and James Griffin	11 September 2007	N/A
40	10	"Feats So Crimeful"	Murray Keane	Michael Bennett	18 September 2007	N/A
41	11	"Unpregnant of My Cause"	Mark Beesley	Rachel Lang	25 September 2007	N/A
42	12	"Good Friends, As You Are Friends"	Mark Beesley	Nick Ward and James Griffin	2 October 2007	N/A
43	13	"To Sleep; No More"	Britta Johnstone	James Griffin	9 October 2007	N/A
44	14	"Natural Magic and Dire Property"	Britta Johnstone	Gavin Strawhan	16 October 2007	N/A
45	15	"Bow Stubborn Knees"	Murray Keane	Michael Bennett	23 October 2007	N/A
46	16	"A Jig or a Tale of Bawdry"	Murray Keane	Tim Balme	30 October 2007	N/A
47	17	"The Secret Parts of Fortune"	Peter Burger	James Griffin	6 November 2007	N/A
48	18	"Who Calls Me Villain?"	Peter Burger	Rachel Lang	13 November 2007	N/A
49	19	"Most Free and Bounteous"	Mark Beesley	Tim Balme and Rachel Lang	20 November 2007	N/A
50	20	"Something Is Rotten"	Mark Beesley	Gavin Strawhan	27 November 2007	N/A
51	21	"The Corrupted Currents of This World"	Simon Bennett	James Griffin	4 December 2007	N/A
52	22	"Where the Offence Is, Let the Great Axe Fall"	Simon Bennett	Rachel Lang	11 December 2007	N/A

=== Series 4 (2008) ===
No. overall	No. in series	Title	Directed by	Written by	Original release date	N.Z. viewers (thousand)
53	1	"Thinking Makes It So"	Mark Beesley	Rachel Lang	17 June 2008	N/A
Cheryl attempts to get custody of Loretta's baby, Pascalle returns home, Wolf attempts to bring his errant family back into line.
54	2	"The Edge of Husbandry"	Mark Beesley	James Griffin	24 June 2008	N/A
Wolf is suspicious of Pascalle's new husband, Milt (Michael Saccente), but doesn't have long to be act on his hunch; Van continues to miss Aurora while Cheryl and Wolf's divorce starts to get messy.
55	3	"As Much Containing"	Britta Johnstone	Tim Balme and Rachel Lang	1 July 2008	N/A
A mysterious container belonging to Wolf arrives on Cheryl's doorstep; Judd investigates before Van and Munter destroy the contents; Pascalle organises a memorial for Milt.
56	4	"Revenged Most Thoroughly"	Britta Johnstone	Rachel Lang	8 July 2008	N/A
57	5	"Remorseless, Treacherous, Lecherous"	Peter Salmon	James Griffin	15 July 2008	N/A
58	6	"A Good Child and a True Gentleman"	Peter Salmon	Tim Balme	22 July 2008	N/A
59	7	"What Is a Man?"	Britta Johnstone	Kate McDermott	29 July 2008	N/A
60	8	"Guilty Creatures"	Britta Johnstone	Fiona Samuel	5 August 2008	N/A
61	9	"Most Foul, Strange and Unnatural"	Simon Bennett	Jan Prettejohns	12 August 2008	112.00
62	10	"The King, The King's to Blame"	Simon Bennett	James Griffin and Rachel Lang	19 August 2008	N/A
63	11	"Most Valiant"	Britta Johnstone	Tim Balme	26 August 2008	N/A
64	12	"Let Them Throw Millions"	Britta Johnstone	Rachel Lang	2 September 2008	N/A
65	13	"Your Chaste Treasure"	Richard Barr	Gavin Strawhan	9 September 2008	N/A
66	14	"Rest Her Soul"	Richard Barr	Jan Prettejohns and Rachel Lang	16 September 2008	N/A
67	15	"Affection! Pooh!"	Britta Johnstone	James Griffin	23 September 2008	N/A
68	16	"A Sister Driven Into Desperate Terms"	Britta Johnstone	Tim Balme and Rachel Lang	30 September 2008	N/A
69	17	"Dangerous Conjectures"	Peter Salmon	Rachel Lang	7 October 2008	N/A
70	18	"Who Comes Here?"	Peter Salmon	James Griffin	14 October 2008	N/A

=== Series 5 (2009) ===
The fifth series begins with the aftermath of Ted's fateful wedding day. Newly pregnant Cheryl and boyfriend Wayne Judd must adapt to the ever-changing family dynamic. Van gets the short end of the stick during a raid on the West house. But it isn't a West that newcomer, Detective Sergeant Zane Gerard (Charles Mesure) is after. Sheree Greegan (Tyler-Jane Mitchel) is arrested instead for robbery, after trying to acquire cash for her unborn babies. However, it turns out Gerard is not after Sheree, but instead has a personal vendetta against her brother, Nicky Greegan (Craig Hall). He's doing whatever it takes to put Nicky behind bars, including blackmailing Van to give up information regarding Nicky. Meanwhile, Loretta hooks up with her brother Jethro and her ex-boyfriend Hayden, with whom she had a child, Jane. They conspire to sell a newly manufactured drug named Excellence, before it becomes illegal.

No. overall	No. in series	Title	Directed by	Written by	Original release date	N.Z. viewers (thousand)
71	1	"All My Sins Remember'd"	Simon Bennett	James Griffin	2 June 2009	408.20
72	2	"The Fatness of These Pursy Times"	Simon Bennett	Rachel Lang	9 June 2009	N/A
73	3	"A Rat, A Rat"	Murray Keane	Tim Balme	16 June 2009	N/A
74	4	"Drive His Purpose"	Murray Keane	Kate McDermott and Rachel Lang	23 June 2009	N/A
75	5	"What Company at What Expense?"	Britta Johnstone	Jan Prettejohns and Rachel Lang	30 June 2009	N/A
76	6	"We Will Our Kingdom Give"	Britta Johnstone	Tim Balme	7 July 2009	N/A
77	7	"Inform Against Me"	Richard Barr	James Griffin	14 July 2009	N/A
78	8	"Some Vicious Mole of Nature"	Richard Barr	Rachel Lang	21 July 2009	N/A
79	9	"Honour's at the Stake"	Simon Bennett	Tim Balme and Rachel Lang	28 July 2009	N/A
80	10	"O Villany!"	Simon Bennett	James Griffin	4 August 2009	406.10
81	11	"A Serpent Stung Me"	Simon Bennett	James Griffin and Rachel Lang	11 August 2009	513.10
82	12	"Unpack My Heart"	Britta Johnstone	Tim Balme and Rachel Lang	18 August 2009	397.60
83	13	"Constant to My Purpose"	Britta Johnstone	Gavin Strawhan	25 August 2009	394.50
84	14	"The Power to Charm"	Murray Keane	Tim Balme	1 September 2009	440.10
85	15	"Mine Own Room"	Murray Keane	James Griffin	8 September 2009	451.70
86	16	"O Wonderful Son (That Can So Astonish a Mother)"	Murray Keane	James Griffin	15 September 2009	N/A
87	17	"They Bleed on Both Sides"	Britta Johnstone	Rachel Lang	22 September 2009	432.90
88	18	"How Like an Angel!"	Britta Johnstone	Rachel Lang	29 September 2009	462.00
89	19	"I Have a Daughter!"	Simon Bennett	Rachel Lang	6 October 2009	483.60

=== Series 6 (2010) ===
John Campbell appeared as himself in a small cameo in "What a Rash and Bloody Deed Is This".

No. overall	No. in series	Title	Directed by	Written by	Original release date	N.Z. viewers (thousand)
90	1	"What a Rash and Bloody Deed Is This"	Britta Johnstone	Rachel Lang	13 July 2010	711.57
91	2	"Do Your Mother's Commandment"	Britta Johnstone	Tim Balme	20 July 2010	N/A
92	3	"To a Radiant Angel Link'd"	Murray Keane	James Griffin	27 July 2010	593.40
93	4	"Make Mad the Guilty and Appal the Free"	Murray Keane	Maxine Fleming and James Griffin	3 August 2010	530.64
94	5	"The Power to Seduce"	Simon Bennett	James Griffin	10 August 2010	520.66
95	6	"When Both Contend"	Simon Bennett	Tim Balme	17 August 2010	484.67
96	7	"Go Seek Him Out"	Murray Keane	James Griffin	24 August 2010	549.35
97	8	"Help, Help, Ho!"	Murray Keane	Fiona Samuel and James Griffin	31 August 2010	471.89
98	9	"Follow Her Close"	Simon Bennett	Rachel Lang	7 September 2010	516.33
99	10	"Thy Loving Father"	Simon Bennett	Jan Prettejohns and Rachel Lang	14 September 2010	530.00
100	11	"Make Love to This Employment"	Britta Johnstone	Tim Balme	21 September 2010	410.60
101	12	"Let the Door Be Lock'd"	Britta Johnstone	James Griffin	28 September 2010	445.39
102	13	"Look Here, Upon This Picture"	Murray Keane	Gavin Strawhan and James Griffin	5 October 2010	474.44
103	14	"Their Grand Commission"	Murray Keane	Rachel Lang	12 October 2010	439.24
104	15	"Desperate Undertakings"	Britta Johnstone	Tim Balme	19 October 2010	478.57
105	16	"Give Me Up the Truth"	Britta Johnstone	Rachel Lang	26 October 2010	456.58
106	17	"Blood and Judgment"	Simon Bennett	James Griffin	2 November 2010	456.13
107	18	"Tis So Concluded"	Simon Bennett	Rachel Lang, James Griffin and Tim Balme	9 November 2010	724.98
