= Jamie Irvine =

New Zealand actor

- Occupation: Actor
- Years active: 2002–present

Jamie Irvine is a New Zealand actor who has appeared in theatre productions, films, and television.

== Early life and education ==
Jamie Irvine has a Bachelor of Arts (Theatre and Film) from Victoria University of Wellington. He was a student at NIDA from 2003 to 2005, where he gained a Bachelor of Dramatic Art (Acting).

He was the recipient of a Mike Walsh Fellowship Special Grant in 2009. He used the money to train in New York City with Susan Batson and at the Stella Adler Studio.

== Career ==
Irvine is known for the role of Detective Ben Charlton on TV3's Underbelly NZ: Land of the Long Green Cloud (2011) He has appeared in a number of short films and on Australian television.

In 2021 he featured in Series 7 of The Brokenwood Mysteries. In Mystery 28, "Something Nasty at the Market" he played Johnny Oades.

Irvine has provided voiceovers in Australia and New Zealand.

== Filmography ==
=== Film ===
Year	Title	Role	Notes
2003	I Think I'm Going	Geoff	
2008	Winners & Losers	Russell Lawson	Short film
2008	Vinyl	Kevin	Short film
2012	Nightstorm	Jim	Short film
2012	The Shed	Al	Short film
2013	Blue Bird	Doctor	Short film
2014	Screaming Goats: The Movie	Radio Broadcaster & Goat Screamer #2 (voice)	
2015	Crushed	Ivan	Feature film
2017	Bridget and Iain	Crossword John	Short film
2017	Weekend Getaway	Michael	Short film
2024	Tinā	Peter Wadsworth	Feature film

=== Television ===
Year	Title	Role	Notes
2002	The Strip	Macey	"Epiphany" (S01E01)
2002	Shortland Street	Dr. Douglas Hampton	unknown episodes
2007	Home and Away	Jon Tallis	unknown episodes
2008	Out of the Blue	Officer Caines	Season 1, Episode 4
2011	Underbelly NZ: Land of the Long Green Cloud	Detective Ben Charlton	Main role
2014	ANZAC Girls	John Wilson	"Courage" (S01E06)
2015	Westside	Marty Johnstone	"Our Poison'd Chalice" (S01E04)
2015	Then That Happened	Pilot	1 Episode
2017	Hummingbird	Jimmy Wendorf	
2018-2025	The Brokenwood Mysteries	Johnny Oades	
2019–2020	Shortland Street	Dr. Ben King	Main Role
2024	N00b	Peter	Episode: "Invercargill Is For Lovers"

=== Theatre ===
Selected productions

Year	Title	Venue
2005 (4-8 Oct) (NIDA, Production Company)	Dreams in an Empty City	Parade Theatre (1969-1999), Kensington, NSW
2006 (2-18 Jun) (Belvoir Theatre Company)	7 Blowjobs	Seymour Centre (Company B) Chippendale, NSW
2006 (6-30 Sep) (The Really Really Serious Theatre Company, Production Company)	Kikia te Poa ("Kick the Boer")	Old Fitzroy Hotel Theatre, Woolloomooloo, NSW
2007 (10-20 Oct) (NIDA, Production Company)	Class Enemy	Parade Studio NIDA
2008 (19 Feb-15 Mar) (Tamarama Rock Surfers, Production Company)	The Soldier and the Thief Sit on a Bridge Over the River Thames While Oblivion Waves Hello	Old Fitzroy Hotel Theatre, Woolloomooloo, NSW
2008 (24 Apr-2 May) (Griffin Theatre Company, Presenting Company)	Colder	Stables Theatre, Darlinghurst, NSW
2009 (25 Nov-20 Dec) (pantsguys Production)	Sydney Ghost Stories	The Old Fitzroy Theatre, Woolloomooloo NSW
2012 (25-30 Sep) (pantsguys Production)	Dogs Barking	King Street Theatre, Newtown NSW
