= 186 Dollars to Freedom =

- Directed by: Camilo Vila
- Written by: Monty Fisher; Camilo Vila
- Produced by: Monty Fisher; Camilo Vila; Alicia Rivera Frankl
- Starring: John Robinson; Alex Meraz; Michael DeLorenzo; Johnny Lewis; Deborah Kara Unger; Grant Bowler
- Cinematography: Henry Vargas
- Edited by: Richard Halsey; Colleen Halsey
- Music by: Roger Bellon
- Production companies: Four Fish Films; DragonTree Media
- Distributed by: Blairwood Entertainment
- Release date: April 20, 2012 (WorldFest-Houston)
- Running time: 99 minutes 101 minutes
- Countries: United States; Peru
- Language: English

186 Dollars to Freedom (also titled The City of Gardens and City of Gardens) is a 2012 Peruvian-American action drama film written by Monty Fisher and Camilo Vila, directed by Vila and starring John Robinson, Alex Meraz, Michael DeLorenzo, Johnny Lewis (in his final film role), Deborah Kara Unger and Grant Bowler.

== Cast ==
- John Robinson as Wayne
- Michael DeLorenzo as Gutierrez
- Alex Meraz as Nicaragua
- Johnny Lewis as Jorge
- Grant Bowler as Jesus Christ
- Anahí de Cárdenas as Maritza
- David Michie as Colonel Ramos
- Deborah Kara Unger as Consul Powers

== Production ==
Filming took place in Peru in May 2010 and in Los Angeles in June 2010.

== Release ==
The film was released at the WorldFest-Houston International Film Festival on April 20, 2012. Then it was released in Manhattan on September 21, 2012.

== Reception ==
John Anderson of Variety gave the film a positive review and wrote that "the characters are solid and the action sound, suggesting the film will do short time theatrically en route to ancillary rehab."

Jeannette Catsoulis of The New York Times gave the film a negative review and wrote, "Unable to shape these events into a dramatic structure, the director, Camilo Vila, resorts to a meandering tale of random indignities suffered by a lead so bland he comes across less as principled than as stupendously naïve."
