= Power Rangers Mystic Force =

American television series

- Genre: Action; Adventure; Superhero; Dark fantasy
- Based on: Mahō Sentai Magiranger by Toei Company
- Developed by: Jetix; The Walt Disney Company; Toei Company
- Showrunner: Bruce Kalish
- Written by: Bruce Kalish; Jackie Marchand; John Tellegen; David Garber; Matt Hawkins
- Directed by: John Laing; Charlie Haskell; Mark Beesley; Andrew Merrifield; Jonathan Brough
- Starring: Firass Dirani; Angie Diaz; Richard Brancatisano; Melanie Vallejo; Nic Sampson; John Tui; Peta Rutter; Chris Graham; Antonia Prebble; Barnie Duncan; Kelson Henderson; Holly Shanahan
- Theme music composer: Chaka Blackmon
- Composers: Bruce Lynch; Steven Vincent
- Countries of origin: United States; Japan
- Original language: English
- No. of episodes: 32

Production
- Executive producers: Bruce Kalish; Koichi Sakamoto
- Producers: Sally Campbell; Charles Knight
- Production locations: New Zealand (Wellington Region) (Wellington), (Auckland Region) (Auckland); Japan (Greater Tokyo Area) (Tokyo, Saitama, Yokohama) and Kyoto)
- Cinematography: Simon Riera
- Camera setup: Single-camera
- Running time: 22 minutes
- Production companies: BVS Entertainment; Renaissance Atlantic Entertainment; Toei Company, Ltd. Ranger Productions, Ltd. Village Roadshow KP Productions Limited

Original release
- Network: Toon Disney (Jetix)
- Release: February 20 – November 13, 2006

Related
- Power Rangers television series

Power Rangers Mystic Force is a television series and the thirteenth entry of the Power Rangers franchise, and is based on the 29th Super Sentai tokusatsu series Mahō Sentai Magiranger. The season premiered on February 20, 2006, as part of the Jetix block on Toon Disney.

== Plot ==
Twenty years ago in a magic-filled dimension, the forces of darkness came into power and a war called the "Great Battle" between good and evil began all while the citizens of the human world remained unaware. An army of monsters, led by a magnificent warrior named Morticon, swarmed the land with their sights set on taking over the magical realm, the human realm, and beyond. The army of Morticon, opposed by five wizards, the most powerful wizard of all Leanbow, cast a spell to pushed back the dark forces and closes the walls of the underworld forever. The Gatekeeper sealed the gates for all eternity. The army of Light successfully thwarted the dark forces' attempt to take the surface world, but the five wizards lost their lives. Leanbow, who sealed himself on their side of the Gate to make sure evil sources do not escape, journeyed to the underworld.

In the present day, the city of Briarwood is struck by an earthquake, which proves powerful enough to crack the seal and allow evil to renew its attempt to invade the Earth. The sorceress Udonna, alerted to their return, seeks out teenagers Nick Russell, Chip Thorn, Xander Bly, and sisters Madison and Vida Rocca, to become the warriors of legend - the Mystic Force Power Rangers. While Nick is reluctant at first, he realizes his destiny and joins the others in the fight against the Master of the Underworld and his numerous minions. When Udonna briefly loses her Ranger powers to the mysterious Koragg, it is up to the team to save the Earth on their own. They are assisted by Udonna's bumbling apprentice, Clare, and eventually Jenji the Genie Cat and his master Daggeron, the Solaris Knight.

Using their powerful magic and incredible martial arts skills, the Rangers must rely on teamwork to save the day. Later, in a shocking surprise, it is revealed that Koragg is none other than Leanbow, the greatest and the strongest of the five original wizards. In a fight with Udonna, Koragg takes over Udonna's magical staff filled with the power of goodness. Over time, Udonna's magical staff, along with the knowledge that Nick is actually his and Udonna's missing son Bowen, helps Koragg turn back to his original self, allowing him to use his powers to transform into the Wolf Warrior. In the end, the Rangers come together to defeat the Master of the Underworld with the help of Briarwood's people with the power of truth and goodness. With the forces of darkness defeated, Nick, Udonna, and Leanbow leave Briarwood to meet Nick's adoptive parents while the remaining Rangers stay behind to protect their home.

== Cast and characters ==
Mystic Force Rangers

- Firass Dirani as Bowen / Nick Russell, the Red Mystic Ranger
- Nic Sampson as Chip Thorn, the Yellow Mystic Ranger
- Melanie Vallejo as Madison "Maddie" Rocca, the Blue Mystic Ranger
- Angie Diaz as Vida "V" Rocca, the Pink Mystic Ranger
- Richard Brancatisano as Xander Bly, the Green Mystic Ranger
- John Tui as Daggeron, the Solaris Knight
- Peta Rutter as Udonna, the White Mystic Ranger
- Chris Graham as Leanbow, the Wolf Warrior

Supporting characters

- Antonia Prebble as Clare
- Barnie Duncan as Toby Slambrook
- Kelson Henderson as Phineas
- Paolo Rotondo as the voice of the Snow Prince
- Oliver Driver as the voice of Jenji
- Holly Shanahan as Leelee Pimvare
- Brigitte Berger as Nikki Pimvare
- Barnie Duncan as Piggy (Cameo Appearance, in the Power Rangers S.P.D. EP 17: "Ranger Down" on Mystic Force)

Villains

- Andrew Robertt as the voice of Morticon
- Stuart Devenie as the voice of Imperious
- Geoff Dolan as the voice of Koragg
- Donogh Rees as the voice of Necrolai
- John Leigh as the voice of Octomus
- Greg Smith as the voice of Magma
- Andrew Laing as the voice of Oculous
- Sally Stockwell as the voice of Serpentina
- Dallas Barnett as the voice of Megahorn
- Charlie McDermott as the voice of Hekatoid
- Mark Ferguson as the voice of Gekkor
- Cameron Rhodes as the voice of Matoombo
- Josephine Davison as the voice of Itassis
- Derek Judge as the voice of Black Lance
- Peter Daube as the voice of Sculpin

== Episodes ==
No.	Title	Directed by	Written by	Original release date
1	"Broken Spell"	John Laing	Bruce Kalish	February 20, 2006
2	"Broken Spell"	John Laing	Bruce Kalish	February 20, 2006
In the small town of Briarwood, an unexpected earthquake releases a group of evil creatures. The sorceress Udonna, who is also the White Mystic Ranger, recruits five teens to help fight these monsters and destroy them. While Vida, Madison, Xander, and Chip have taken an immediate liking to their magic, the fifth, Nick, has yet to unlock his hidden abilities. It's up to the team to work together to drive back the forces of darkness. With the four teens now beginning to understand their new destinies, Udonna is confronted by Koragg the Knight Wolf. Using the Knight Wolf Centaur, he defeats the White Ranger and takes her Snow Staff. With Udonna unable to morph, the four adults immediately begin their legacy and morph into Mystic Force Power Rangers. Udonna tries to make Nick accept his destiny to be the Red Ranger, but she cannot change his mind. When Koragg overpowers the other four Rangers, Nick arrives and finally believes in himself and magic. He morphs into the Red Mystic Ranger and joins the others in defeating Koragg.
3	"Code Busters"	John Laing	Jackie Marchand	February 27, 2006
Vida and Chip go around town to perform "good deeds" in an attempt to unlock new spell codes within the Xenotome. When Madison, Nick, and Xander are captured inside the Mucor monster, Vida and Chip come to terms with the true nature of heroism, allowing the team to unlock their first new spell code to transform into their Zords, the Mystic Titans. Meanwhile, the Hydra Worm is released into the forest, and attacks a goblin named Phineas, who tells Nick of the true master of the Underworld. Using another new spell code, the Rangers assume the Mystic Titans' Dragon Formation to defeat the Hydra Worm.
4	"Rock Solid"	Charlie Haskell	Jackie Marchand	March 6, 2006
Nick teases Madison for hiding behind her camera, and she tries to prove him wrong. However, during a walk in the park, Madison is turned to stone by the monster Clawbster. Udonna and the Ranger's magic isn't strong enough to change Madison back, as destroying Clawbster is the only way. Upon realizing he was wrong and learning Madison's fate, Nick receives the Mystic Speeder spell code and hurries to save her. After Madison is freed, the Rangers receive another spell and form the Titan Megazord to destroy Clawbster.
5	"Whispering Voices"	Charlie Haskell	John Tellegen	March 13, 2006
Koragg uses Udonna's Snow Staff to cause Nick self-doubt in an attempt to turn the others against him. Leelee makes matters worse by hiding $1000 from Rock Porium and implicating Nick in the theft. After the truth is revealed, Koragg unleashes the Centaurus Wolf Megazord on the Rangers, robs the team of their Megazord powers, and uses it to briefly bring Morticon to the surface world.
6	"Legendary Catastros"	Charlie Haskell	John Tellegen	March 20, 2006
Without the power to form the Titan Megazord, Koragg's latest attack sends the Rangers reeling, during which he is attacked by Necrolai for lying to Morticon. Koragg's attempts to leave the battlefield are compromised when the Dark Seal accidentally sends Nick and Koragg's equestrian companion, Catastros, to another dimension. Nick aids the wounded horse and returns to Briarwood in time to stop the Rock Troll with the Centaurus Phoenix Megazord. Afterwards, Catastros returns to Koragg.
7	"Fire Heart"	Mark Beesley	David Garber	March 27, 2006
Necrolai, aided by the Taxi Cab Monster, steals a map that will lead them to the magical Fire Heart. The Rangers discover this and travel through the dangerous Cimmerian Forest to find it. Later, the Rangers defeat the Taxi Cab Monster, but Vida tears the map in the ensuing battle against Necrolai. Will the Rangers ever be able to find the Fire Heart with only half of the map?
8	"Stranger Within"	Mark Beesley	Bruce Kalish	April 3, 2006
9	"Stranger Within"	Mark Beesley	Bruce Kalish	April 17, 2006
Part 1: The day after she goes to nightclub with Leelee, Vida returns to Root Core nearly 24 hours later, displaying multiple personality changes. Aside from that, she seems fine, but upon closer inspection, Chip unmasks her as a vampire (the sun weakens Vida when the Rangers transform into Mystic Titan Dragon Formation)! After the Rangers destroy Flytrap, the citizens of Briarwood return to normal, and the Rangers think it is all over... until Chip's "Vampire Chalk" traps Vida. Part 2: A still-vampiric Vida is taken back to Root Core by the others, but escapes and engages them in battle. Chip is ready to destroy Necrolai, but Vida stands in the way of his crossbow. After struggling to break through to her, he succeeds and fires the Dawn Crystal at Necrolai, destroying her. Unfortunately, Necrolai revives herself later that night, and Leelee is revealed to be her daughter.
10	"Petrified Xander"	Andrew Merrifield	John Tellegen	April 24, 2006
With a bulbous pimple on his face, Xander goes to extremes and uses Clare's "Plant Perfection Potion" to remove the blemish. While it works at first, however, Xander slowly realizes it's turning him into a tree, causing him to go bunk with Phineas! Vida and Clare do their best to help while the other Rangers face Skullington. Meanwhile, Toby attempts to uncover the secret of the box with the Fire Heart inside, after Vida and Xander reconstruct the destroyed map to locate its whereabouts. The Rangers soon learn the Fire Heart is the last Dragon's egg.
11	"The Gatekeeper"	Andrew Merrifield	Jackie Marchand	May 8, 2006
12	"The Gatekeeper"	Andrew Merrifield	Jackie Marchand	May 15, 2006
Part 1: When Clare learns of her mother Niella's legacy, she takes on the Gatekeeper's role when the Rangers are no match for Necrolai's new powers. While she is initially victorious, however, she later tries to overpower Koragg after he kidnaps Udonna and forces Clare to fight him. Clare is ultimately seized by Necrolai and used to raise the gates to the Underworld. Part 2 The gates have been raised, and Morticon is set free thanks to a crack made from the Titan Megazord. Koragg kidnaps Clare and wants to release his master from the gate, but he is unsuccessful. After Nick saves Clare from Koragg, the Rangers reunite. With Udonna's power channeled through the Megazord, Morticon is destroyed. Clare sealed the gate from the gatekeeper's power when the master attempted to release from the gate, but now Clare's powers are gone.
13	"Scaredy Cat"	Charlie Haskell	Bruce Kalish	June 5, 2006
Clare prepares to hatch the dragon egg as the Rangers investigate a cave on the beach. Inside, Necrolai attacks and takes an old mummy relic, but the Rangers hold onto a mystical lamp. Back at Root Core, the wisecracking, feline genie, Jenji, is released just as the newly revived Imperious is sent into the city. He blows the Rangers away and prepares to squash the Titan Megazord until Jenji steps in to save the day. As Udonna returns, the egg hatches, revealing the baby dragon, who the Rangers subsequently name Fire Heart.
14	"Long Ago"	Charlie Haskell	John Tellegen	June 12, 2006
Imperious disguises himself as Calindor and tries to persuade Udonna into believing he can help the Rangers. Meanwhile, Jester the Pester has the Rangers on the ropes until a brave frog steps in and saves Madison's life. To repay her debt, Madison kisses the frog, who reverts to his true form: Daggeron, the Solaris Knight. By teaming up with Jenji, Daggeron uses his ability to destroy Jester.
15	"Inner Strength"	Charlie Haskell	Matt Hawkins	June 12, 2006
When Xander neglects his training, Daggeron takes the Rangers on a trip to a dangerous dimension called Shalifar. After he leaves to fight Behemoth, it's up to Xander to save the others from a giant who is (quite ironically) a vegetarian. Xander perfects his abilities by growing pomegranates for the giant. Once the Rangers return to Briarwood, Xander gets the new Mystic Muscles spell code to even the score, and Daggeron ultimately defeats the Behemoth with the Solar Streak Megazord.
16	"Soul Specter"	Charlie Haskell	Jackie Marchand	June 19, 2006
Chip accidentally opens a magic bottle that begins to slowly steal his soul. To help him, Daggeron takes him to the top of Mount Isis to retrieve the Staff of Topaz, where he gets into a battle with Koragg for the artifact. Meanwhile, the other Rangers try to stop Gnatu and Spydax from stealing any more souls from Briarwood's citizens. After the staff's magic heals Chip, he returns to assist the Rangers. In the end, Daggeron promises to train Chip to be a knight, as he was trained to be a knight under Udonna's husband, Leanbow.
17	"Ranger Down"	Jonathan Brough	John Tellegen	June 26, 2006
Jenji gets jealous of the attention Fire Heart is getting and takes the baby to live in the forest, where Phineas takes him in. Meanwhile, Imperious challenges Koragg to fight without magic and gives Koragg's magic to Necrolai in the form of a purple Mystic Morpher. With it and the new harpy creature Screamer, she leads an assault and immobilizes all Rangers except Madison. She and Jenji show up and destroy Screamer with a combination of Jenji's "Super Cat Attack" and Madison's water-based "Jenji Shining Attack". Back in the forest, Fire Heart has grown to monstrous proportions, and when Udonna confronts Phineas about his "saving a second baby", she learns that her son Bowen is still alive in the human world.
18	"Dark Wish"	Mark Beesley	John Tellegen	July 10, 2006
19	"Dark Wish"	Mark Beesley	Bruce Kalish	July 10, 2006
20	"Dark Wish"	Mark Beesley	Jackie Marchand	July 10, 2006
Part 1: Udonna and Daggeron grow concerned when the Rangers start to become lazy and use magic for even the smallest of tasks. Meanwhile, Imperious summons the Barbarian Beasts to fight the Rangers and take out Koragg (knowing that the Knight Wolf will not allow him to make a move against the Master). When fighting becomes too tiring, the Rangers want to resort to Daggeron using the Jenji Shining Attack to finish the beasts off. Daggeron repeatedly refuses, but the Rangers' persistence convinces Daggeron to use it on 50-Below and Fightoe. Jenji is subsequently captured and taken to the Underworld, while Koragg is gravely injured after taking on the Barbarian Beasts without magic. Imperious, with Jenji at his disposal, wishes that there were no Mystic Force Rangers. The Rangers leave the magical realm when suddenly Imperious's wish starts to take effect. Daggeron is erased from existence, a dark force overtakes Root Core, and the color is drained from the world. Part 2: The Rangers find that the city has been overrun with Imperious' forces, led by Necrolai. Music is banned from the world, Root Core has been destroyed, and the Rangers have lost their magic. When Koragg finds them in the forest, he tells them what has happened, and that the only way to reverse Jenji's wish is to see the Tribunal of Magic, which they can reach by riding Fire Heart (raised by Koragg in this alternate timeline) into another dimension. There, the Rangers wander through the desert until they ultimately find a door leading to the Tribunal of Magic. The Tribunal asks why the Rangers have come. After a short conversation, the Tribunal declines the Ranger's request to reverse the wish, sending them back to Briarwood, powerless. Deciding that they now have no hope, the Rangers are quickly captured by Necrolai's forces as the Tribunal sees the Rangers' surrender as proof they've made the right decision. Part 3: When Hidiacs and Necrolai attack Toby, Nick and the others rush in to help regardless of whether they'll be destroyed. They are easily defeated without their powers, but as Necrolai steps in to finish the Rangers off, the Tribunal reverses the wish after witnessing the Rangers' bravery, to Imperious' disbelief. In the underworld, Jenji tricks Leelee into letting him go, and he quickly teleports to Root Core. The Rangers, with their powers back, quickly defeat the Hidiacs, but 50-Below and Fightoe are sent to Earth again, and after being beaten badly, the Rangers finally learn not to take their magic for granted. When the Tribunal sees this change, they grant the Rangers new powers: Legend Warrior Mode. The Rangers defeat 50-Below and then use the Manticore Megazord to defeat Ursus, a machine golem powered by Fightoe's spirit. In the end, the Rangers celebrate the Rock-Porium's anniversary with a cake that, while not made with magic and not as nice looking, is very much appreciated by Toby.
21	"Koragg's Trial"	Jonathan Brough	John Tellegen	July 22, 2006
Koragg takes his magic back from Necrolai to challenge the Rangers' new Legend power. When Koragg grows, the Rangers use the Manticore Megazord and start to win, but Imperious summons a virus that infects the Megazord (and Rangers inside). Koragg, angered by Imperious' intrusion on their battle, negates the effects of the virus. As a result, Imperious makes Koragg stand trial for his countless failures and treason. Koragg argues that while he fights with honor in The Master's name, Imperious does not and shouldn't be trusted. In the end, The Master agrees and allows Koragg to keep his power.
22	"Heir Apparent"	Jonathan Brough	Jackie Marchand	July 29, 2006
23	"Heir Apparent"	Jonathan Brough	Jackie Marchand	August 11, 2006
Part 1: As Udonna and Daggeron tell the Rangers how Leanbow was sealed away in the Underworld and how Udonna's son, Bowen, was brought to the Human world by Phineas, Imperious plots to use the Rangers' Legend power to revive The Master. He has Koragg deal with the Rangers. While fighting Daggeron in the Dimension of Wandering Souls, Imperious tricks Daggeron by using the Solar Streak Megazord's energy and the spirits of the monsters slain by Leanbow to create the Chimaera. After Imperious disposes of Daggeron, Chimaera and Koragg capture the Rangers. Udonna uses a dark spell to travel to the Underworld, but The Master quickly strikes her down. Koragg's visions intensify into an onslaught of flashbacks, and when he finally realizes the truth, he attacks the Master, saves Udonna, and assumes his true form: Leanbow. Part 2: With Leanbow's help, the Rangers and Udonna escape the Underworld, and Leanbow teleports a weakened Udonna away. When the unicorn Brightstar appears, Nick destroys Chimaera with the Phoenix Unizord, but when Leanbow is turned back into Koragg, Nick has a hard time holding him off. During the fight, Daggeron arrives to settle things with Imperious. Clare gives a severely weakened Udonna (who has lost all her magic by casting the dark spell) Nick's baby blanket, and when she realizes who Nick is, she rushes to the battlefield to tell everyone that Nick is her long-lost son, Bowen. Daggeron defeats Imperious, who turns to dust while foretelling a cryptic remark. Just as Leanbow turns back to his true form, The Master uses the Legend power and begins to rise from the Underworld. Leanbow freezes the Rangers in place and fights The Master himself. He stops his revival and returns the Rangers' Legend power, but he seemingly perishes in the battle. Udonna, however, adjusting to life as a mother without magic, believes that Leanbow is still alive.
24	"The Light"	Andrew Merrifield	Bruce Kalish	August 14, 2006
Udonna leaves Root Core to search for Leanbow. Shortly after, the Ten Terrors arrive and start their campaign to punish the Earth for refusing dark magic, as well as to find "the Light", the child born of magical blood that has the natural potential to be the strongest sorcerer of all. After confronting Phineas about this, Nick finds out that he is the Light. Magma is the first Terror to challenge the Rangers, implicating his own rules in a special game; if the Rangers are still standing by the time the radio tower is done burning, they will win. When the Rangers transform to the Manticore Megazord, Magma quickly stops them. The onlooking Terrors notice that the tower has burnt down all the way; Magma has lost his own game, and he is destroyed as punishment. Gekkor points out to Necrolai that the Rules of Darkness must be adhered to for The Master to return.
25	"The Hunter"	Andrew Merrifield	John Tellegen	August 20, 2006
The second of the Ten Terrors is chosen to destroy The Light. When Oculous immobilises four Rangers, Nick summons Fire Heart and unlocks the power of the Mystic Battlizer to become Red Dragon Fire Ranger in order to kill Oculous and get his friends back. Meanwhile, Megahorn breaks the sacred rules and sets out on his own to battle Daggeron, as Udonna finds a familiar face following her.
26	"Hard Heads"	Andrew Merrifield	Matt Hawkins	September 18, 2006
Nick and Vida argue over Nick using Vida's DJ equipment. They get slimed by Hekatoid, so they can't morph. As stubborn as they are, they need to work together to save the others from Serpentina.
27	"The Snow Prince"	Andrew Merrifield	Jackie Marchand	September 25, 2006
Trying to stop The Master from rising, Leanbow has to deal with Sculpin's attempt to foil his plan. The Snow Prince commands that instead of being a teacher, Daggeron should learn from Nick on following his instincts, which comes in handy when fighting Megahorn. Hekatoid finds and captures Udonna, knocking Claire unconscious.
28	"Light Source"	Charlie Haskell	John Tellegen	October 9, 2006
29	"Light Source"	Charlie Haskell	John Tellegen	October 9, 2006
Part 1: Hekatoid has captured Udonna, and the Rangers chase after him in his dimension to rescue her. Daggeron, in the real world, tries to stop all the tadpoles Hekatoid has laid from destroying the world. Part 2: The teens lose their powers trying to save Udonna, so Leelee, Phineas, and Clare end up saving her instead, along with her White Ranger powers. The Rangers are forced to stick to their normal lives, during which they are forced to reveal their identities to Toby. The Terrors also acquire The Master from a defeated Leanbow.
30	"The Return"	Charlie Haskell	Bruce Kalish	October 30, 2006
Matoombo is chosen to bring forth the Master, but he doesn't want to hurt anyone. Vida teams up with him to try to seal the Master away. Later, Leanbow comes to the Rangers' aid, morphing into Wolf Warrior to defeat Gekkor.
31	"Mystic Fate"	Mark Beesley	Jackie Marchand	November 13, 2006
32	"Mystic Fate"	Mark Beesley	Bruce Kalish	November 13, 2006
Part 1: Itasiss is chosen to destroy the surface world. Refusing, she tries to convince the remaining Terrors of the thing called courage; she is killed anyway. The Master decides to take care of things himself, starting with Nick. After taking over Nick's mind and body to create a new Koragg, he proceeds to destroy the Mystic Village, taking Leanbow with him into Root Core for a showdown, and trashing it in the process. Nick breaks free of the Master's evil hold, expelling him into the real world. The Snow Prince appears in Root Core, bringing news that the Mystic Realm has been destroyed and that Mystic Mother (a reformed Rita Repulsa) is nowhere to be found. While Daggeron and Leanbow fight in the Mystic Realm against the Master, Udonna takes on Sculpin, and the Rangers continue their fight with Black Lance. The Rangers and Udonna seem to be defeated as they lie on the ground, powerless. Leanbow and Daggeron combine their powers in one final attempt to destroy the Master, but their magic is too weak. After the Master devours their magic, Daggeron takes a blow for Leanbow and is killed. In the upper world, Jenji shields the Rangers from one of Sculpin's attacks and is destroyed. Meanwhile, Udonna is taken to the underworld by Sculpin. Part 2: Nick, not willing to give up, fights Black Lance, destroying him with the other Rangers. The Master arrives, spitting out a dead Daggeron and Leanbow before he devours time until they are in the future; a dead, barren, and dark wasteland. After fighting the Master in the Manticore Megazord, their powers are extinguished. Nick is convinced that they should give up, but upon being confronted by his team, Nick uses all his remaining power and forces the Master to spit out the time he devoured. Though the Master threatens to destroy them, they are saved by the Snow Prince and Clare. Mystic Mother lived by turning herself into energy before escaping. As the Master retreats, Udonna appears with Itassis and Necrolai. Itassis tells how Necrolai saved her and destroyed Sculpin with the power of courage. Leanbow and Daggeron are revived by Necrolai, while Jenji returns to his normal self. Necrolai was turned into a human thanks to the good energy she absorbed. The humans, led by Toby, and the mystical creatures, led by Phineas, band together to return the magic to the Rangers. The Rangers take on the Master with all their powers, destroying him with their overwhelming magic. The story wraps up with everyone working together, the world united, and having a party in Toby's store with a revived Matoombo. Nick is leaving Briarwood to be with his parents, promising to Madison he will return for her upon giving her his red blanket. Nick, Udonna, and Leanbow ride off into the sunset, with Fire Heart rushing behind, while Clare is now a sorceress and resident of Root Core. Note: This two-parter aired in the United Kingdom on November 4, 2006, before the United States' broadcast.

== Comics ==
Characters have been featured in Power Rangers comics published by Boom! Studios.

In 2018, the Mystic Force Rangers appeared in "Shattered Grid", a crossover event between teams from all eras commemorating the 25th anniversary of the original television series. It was published in Mighty Morphin Power Rangers #25-30 and various tie-ins.

A Power Rangers Mystic Force story by Magdalene Visaggio and French Carlomagno was published the same year in Mighty Morphin Power Rangers 25th Anniversary Special #1.
