= Underbelly NZ: Land of the Long Green Cloud =

Six-part New Zealand television mini-series

- Genre: Drama
- Written by: John Banas
- Directed by: Mike Smith, Ric Pellizzeri
- Starring: Dan Musgrove; Thijs Morris; Jamie Irvine; Holly Shanahan
- Country of origin: New Zealand
- Original language: English
- No. of series: 1
- No. of episodes: 6

Production
- Executive producer: Philly de Lacey
- Producer: Ric Pellizzeri
- Running time: 40 minutes
- Production company: Screentime

Original release
- Network: TV3
- Release: 17 August – 21 September 2011

Related
- Underbelly

Underbelly NZ: Land of the Long Green Cloud is a six-part New Zealand television mini-series. The series originally aired from 17 August 2011 to 21 September 2011. It was the first Underbelly series to be created outside of Australia, and depicts events prior to and concurrent with Underbelly: A Tale of Two Cities.

== Plot ==
The series is an account of the rise and fall of New Zealand's 'Mr. Asia', Marty Johnstone (Dan Musgrove), who built the country's first ever drug cartel, the Syndicate. Set between 1972 and 1980, it traces Johnstone's development from small-time crook to international playboy with a global drug empire, and how he became the architect of his own demise. Closely aligned with Johnstone's tale is that of Detective Constable Ben Charlton (Jamie Irvine), who realises that changing criminal tactics will necessitate drastic alterations in New Zealand policing. Charlton also acts as the narrator of the series.

The six-part narrative can be seen as a prequel of sorts to the Australian series Underbelly: A Tale of Two Cities, which focuses on fellow Kiwi and Syndicate member, Terry Clark. However, events in the two shows do overlap, as both cover the period 1976–1980. Characters that appear in both shows include Clark, Johnstone, Andy Maher and Karen Soich, but none of the actors reprise their roles in the New Zealand series.

== Production and airing ==
On 21 December 2010, New Zealand on Air announced it would contribute almost NZD$3.9 million to TV3 and production company Screentime for six one-hour episodes of Underbelly NZ, saying that the Marty Johnstone story was "a dramatic part of New Zealand's history - in some ways the end of innocence for us and our police force."

The mini-series began filming in April 2011, around the same time as Underbelly: Razor. All six episodes were scripted by screenwriter John Banas, known for his work on Australian crime shows such as City Homicide and Blue Heelers. Mike Smith directed four of the episodes, while series producer Ric Pellizzeri took the director's chair for the remaining two.

The show was originally set to debut on 10 August 2011 at 8:30pm, but NZ On Air asked TV3 to move its timeslot to avoid clashing with another local drama, Nothing Trivial, on rival channel TVNZ. Eventually, the show was moved to 9:30pm and broadcast delayed by a week.

On 22 September 2011, a day after the TV broadcast ended, the complete series was released as a two-disc set on DVD.

== Cast and characters ==
Underbelly NZ: Land of the Long Green Cloud features 12 regular cast members, with others who recur through the series.

Dan Musgrove stars as the drug dealer, Marty Johnstone, also known as 'Mr. Asia', and Thijs Morris plays his right-hand man, Andy Maher. On the police side, Detective Constable Ben Charlton, the narrator of the series, is played by Jamie Irvine, and Holly Shanahan portrays his colleague, Detective Constable Caroline Derwent. Other members of the regular cast include Andrew Laing as DSS Laurie Mackenzie, Calvin Tuteao as Diamond Jim Shepherd, Damien Avery as Det. 'Goose' Gosling, Richard Knowles as DS 'Ding' Bell, Edith Poor as Bonnie Marie Jones, Gary Young as Chinese Jack, Joel Tobeck as Gary Majors, and Stelios Yiakmis as Big Ari.

The recurring cast includes:

- Daniel Musgrove as Marty Johnstone
- Erroll Shand as Terry Clark
- Aaron Thomas Ward as Pommy Harry Lewis
- Mark Warren as Max Bracewell
- Arthur Meek as Doug Wilson
- Colin Moy as Sgt 'Skin' Skinner
- Fleur Saville as Sue MacPherson
- Geoff Snell as Keith Aitken
- Grae Burton as Peter Miller
- Jason Hoyte as Pat Booth
- Johnny Barker as Josh Easby
- Rachael Blampied as Farah Wainwright
- Scott Wills as Clive Pilborough
- Aimee Gestro as Jenny Olsen
- Dawn Adams as Sonya Turner
- Denise Snoad as Leila Barclay
- Edwin Wright as Freddie Russell
- Grant McFarland as Piak
- Jaime Passier-Armstrong as Isobel Wilson
- John Leigh as Mac The Mick
- Peter Tait as CS Chesterfield
- Tahl Kennedy as Stephen Johnstone
- Will Hall as Greg Ollard
- Anna Jullienne as Deb Masters
- Melissa Reeve as Karen Soich

== Critical reception ==
The series was generally well received in New Zealand. Chris Philpott of Stuff.co.nz called it "an interesting, albeit familiar, story focusing on a riveting character on a fascinating journey, that was performed and produced to an extremely high standard." However, some criticised the show for emphasising style over substance, sacrificing character development for a fast-paced story.

== Episodes ==
No.	Title	Directed by	Written by	Original release date
1	"Disorganised Crime"	Mike Smith	John Banas	17 August 2011
Marty Johnstone's small time criminal career gets a big boost when he makes contact with a supplier of Thai cannabis sticks. With his new business associates, Terry Smith and Big Ari, he quickly builds a drug empire. Detectives Ben Charlton and Caroline Derwent help with Marty's arrest, but his lawyer manages to swing bail.
2	"Trains 'n' Boats 'n' Planes"	Mike Smith	John Banas	24 August 2011
Marty tries his luck in the tough London criminal scene, setting up the smuggling of 75,000 LSD tabs. The Syndicate becomes more organised as Ben and Caroline are assigned to the Special Investigations unit. Marty sets about acquiring his own blue-water capable boat as the police establish an undercover operation.
3	"All at Sea"	Riccardo Pellizzeri	John Banas	31 August 2011
Andy and Marty arrange their first big blue-water shipment out of Thailand, but the enterprise is not without its difficulties. The Special Investigations unit has major setbacks as they try to build a case against the Syndicate, despite a lack of support from above. Josh Easby, a reporter at the Auckland Star, realises he may be onto something big.
4	"Marty / Party"	Riccardo Pellizzeri	John Banas	7 September 2011
Marty is living the high life, but his addictions to cocaine and heroin mean that mistakes are being made. Terry Clark begins plotting to cut Marty out of the New Zealand drug market. Ben and Carole are frustrated by the powers-that-be, and the drug war gets personal when shots are fired at Carole's house. Marty's plan to smuggle heroin by boat goes horribly wrong.
5	"Dominoes"	Mike Smith	John Banas	14 September 2011
Marty desperately tries to clean himself up in order to get back on top. The Auckland Star investigation continues and it puts pressure on both the police and Marty. Carole's domestic problems continue. Terry has Pommy Harry killed, as the tensions between himself and Marty reach boiling point. As Marty loses more money in bad deals, Terry begins pressuring Andy to kill his old friend.
6	"Thirty of Silver / One of Gold"	Mike Smith	John Banas	21 September 2011
Andy reluctantly starts the preparations to kill Marty, who is desperately trying to set up one more deal. Carole and Max are reunited. Andy lures Marty to Scotland and kills him, bringing the police case to an abrupt end. Even though Marty never faced the force of the law, he proves to be a catalyst for drastic changes in both crime and policing in New Zealand.

== International broadcast ==
- Australia — The series aired on Go! from 28 December 2013.
