= Siobhan Marshall =

New Zealand actress (born 1983)

- Born: 1983; Auckland, New Zealand
- Occupation: Actress
- Years active: 2004–present
- Spouse: Millen Baird
- Children: 2

Siobhan Marshall is a New Zealand actress best known for her role as Pascalle West from the comedy/drama series Outrageous Fortune (2005–2010).

== Career ==
Marshall attended Auckland's Unitec School of Performing Screen Arts and graduated in 2003.

In 2004, Marshall appeared on Shortland Street, playing a character coincidentally called Siobhan. She next appeared as "Dominique" in one episode of the kid's show Amazing Extraordinary Friends.

She is represented by Auckland Actors and Encompass Entertainment Group.

In 2015, she appeared on a sixth series of the New Zealand version of Dancing with the Stars with her professional dancing partner, Charlie Billington, where she was placed third in the competition.

== Personal life ==
Marshall, who stands at 183 cm (6.0 ft) tall, has a brother and sister. As of 2013, Marshall had rented out her home in the Auckland suburb of Oratia, having moved in to her mother's home in Auckland. She married actor Millen Baird in 2016. They have two children.

== Filmography ==
=== Television ===
Year	Title	Role	Notes
2004	Shortland Street	Siobhan O'Leary	Recurring role
2005–2010	Outrageous Fortune	Pascalle West	Main cast
2007	The Amazing Extraordinary Friends	Dominique	Episode: "Attack of the Atomic Bombshell"
2012	The Almighty Johnsons	Mia	Episode: "A Damn Fine Woman"
2013	The Almighty Johnsons	Hanna Larsen	3 episodes (series 3)
2013	The Blue Rose	Linda Frame	Main cast
2014	Shortland Street	Dr. Ava Erikkson	Recurring role
2015	Find Me a Maori Bride	Debbie Alpert	Episodes 1–4
2015	Dancing with the Stars	Herself	Season 6 contestant
2021–2022	Power Rangers Dino Fury	Santaura/Void Queen	Main cast

=== Film ===
Year	Title	Role	Notes
2011	Emilie Richards – Der Zauber von Neuseeland	Lisa Sinclair	TV film
2015	Abandoned	Martha	TV film
2017	Pork Pie	Becca	
