= Roz Turnbull =

New Zealand actress

- Born: 1972 (age 53–54); New Zealand
- Occupation: Actress
- Years active: 2002 – present

Roz Turnbull (born 1972) is a New Zealand actress who has appeared in a number of films and television series in New Zealand, but is best known for her role as Rochelle in Outrageous Fortune. She has been seen in Mercy Peak, Shortland Street, the first season of The Almighty Johnsons and Go Girls.

== Career summary ==
In 2010, after doing her role for the sixth series of Outrageous Fortune, Roz was offered a leading role in South Pacific Pictures’ TV drama/comedy series, The Almighty Johnsons, a co-production from the makers of the Outrageous Fortune, Rachel Lang and James Griffin for TV3. This was followed by two South Pacific Pictures' 90 minute drama tel-films called, Stolen and Spies and Lies aired on TV ONE. Her other TV films include, Jackson's Wharf in 2000, The Vector File in 2001, two series of Mercy Peak (2001 – 2003) and a meaty role in the South Pacific Pictures feature film We're Here to Help in 2007. Roz also acted in theatrical dramas like, Girl Talk, Rigoletto, Magic Flute, Grand Hotel, Follies, Trust, and Popcorn.

In addition to acting, Roz was a singer who performed at TV3’s Big Night In Telethon (2009) and Christmas in the Park (2009).

== Personal ==
Stardom does not seem to affect Roz when it comes to her idea about family life. She has always time to enjoy the warmth of her country home just outside Auckland and spend time with her two little boys, and husband Lance, who works as manager in a childrenswear company. she believes in making sacrifices in order to achieve a stable family life. ”When you get married and have kids, it stops being about you all the time. You can’t just carry on purely making choices that suit you", is what Roz has to say.

She further speaks her mind about the philosophy of life like this: "Lance is fully supportive of my work but he still deserves to have a wife. I can’t just say, 'Sorry, darling, I’m off to this party,’ or 'I'm going to do a play in Wellington for three months.' That's not what a relationship is all about. Lance provides a lifestyle that allows me to do the job I do. I don't take that for granted".

== Filmography ==
Film and television
Year	Title	Role	Notes
2001-2003	Mercy Peak	Lynda Bracey	
2002	Atomic Twister	Jake's Mother	TV movie
2003	The Vector File	Stephanie	TV movie
2005-2010	Outrageous Fortune	Rochelle Stephens	Series regular
2007	We're Here to Help	Carol McRae	Movie
2010	Stolen	Detective Sally Holland	TV movie
2010	Spies and Lies	Miss Johnson	TV movie
2011	The Almighty Johnsons	Valerie Johnson	8 episodes
2012	Shortland Street	Cat Gibson	
2013	Go Girls	Sandy Beech	1 episode: "Fate, Karma, Whatever..."
2014	The Brokenwood Mysteries	Alison Stone	1 episode: "Playing the Lie"
2018	Power Rangers Super Ninja Steel	Judge	1 episode: "Episode 8: The Need For Speed"
2024	Little Lou	Lilla	Short film
