= Grant Bowler =

New Zealand–Australian actor

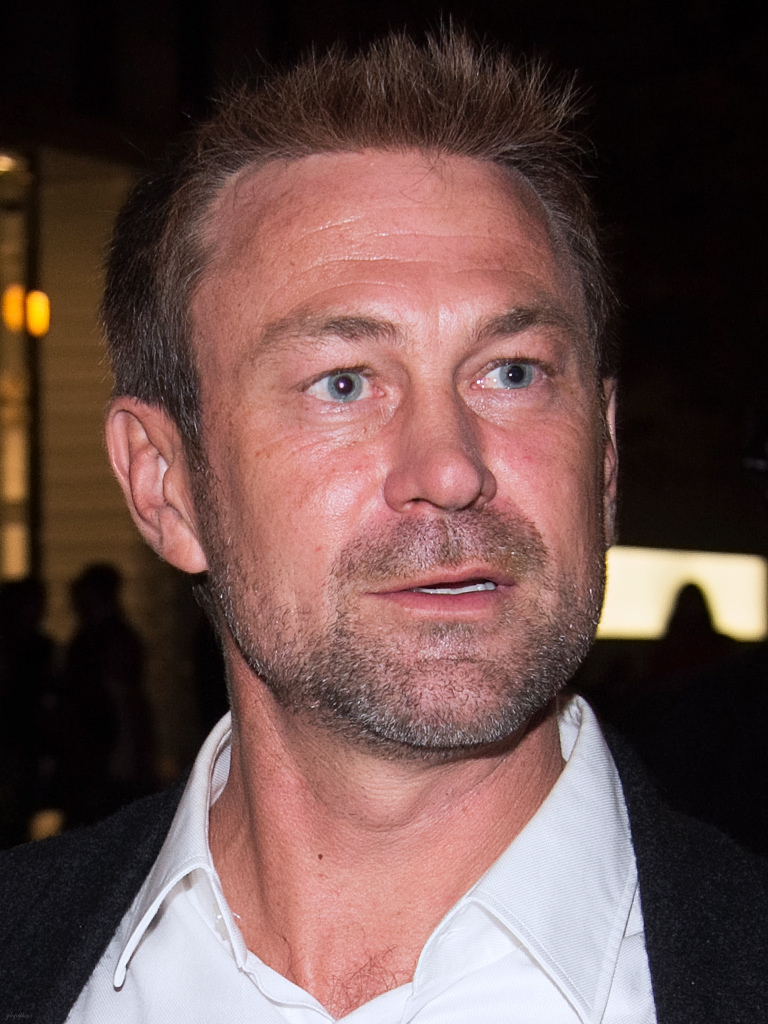
- Bowler at the 2012 Toronto International Film Festival
- Born: 18 July 1968 (age 57); Auckland, New Zealand
- Education: National Institute of Dramatic Art (BFA)
- Occupations: Actor, television presenter
- Years active: 1993–present
- Spouse: Roxane Wilson (m. 2001; div. 2011)
- Children: 2

Grant Bowler (born 18 July 1968) is a New Zealand-Australian actor and television presenter who has worked in American, Australian, New Zealand, and Canadian film, television, and theatre.

He is known for playing the role of Constable Wayne Patterson in Blue Heelers and Wolfgang West in Outrageous Fortune. He also appeared as Wilhelmina Slater's love interest Connor Owens in Ugly Betty. He significantly starred as Joshua Nolan on the Syfy television series Defiance.

As a presenter, he was best known for hosting reality game shows – including The Mole Australia and The Amazing Race Australia, both of which aired on the Seven Network.

Bowler has been the voiceover narrator for Border Security: Australia for the Seven Network since 2004. He has also provided the narration for the Canadian version and the American version when those versions air in Australia and New Zealand as Border Security: International on 7two.

== Personal life ==
Bowler was born in Auckland, New Zealand, but moved to Australia when he was young, and was raised in Brisbane.

In 2011, he separated from his wife of nine years, Australian actress Roxane Wilson, with whom he has two children.

== Career ==
Bowler is a graduate of the National Institute of Dramatic Art. For two years, he worked extensively in theatre with the Bell Shakespeare Company touring with the original company founded by John Bell.

His first television role was as Constable Wayne Patterson on Blue Heelers, from 1993 to 1996. After leaving that show, he played Garth Stephens in Pacific Drive in 1996, and he joined the main cast of Medivac as Dr Arch Craven, a role he played from 1996 to 1998. He had recurring roles on Always Greener and Stingers, starred in the television adaptation of On the Beach, spent a year on the ABC series Something in the Air, and starred in the 2004 miniseries Through My Eyes about the disappearance of Azaria Chamberlain. Bowler had a recurring role on All Saints from 2004 to 2005.

Bowler hosted the Australian version of The Mole from 2000 to 2003. He was replaced in the 2005 series by Tom Williams because of family commitments and his duties with Border Security: Australia's Front Line. He is the narrator of the latter show, having begun as on-camera host in 2004 and transitioning to the off-camera role after the first season.

Bowler appeared in the New Zealand series Outrageous Fortune in the recurring role of Wolfgang West. He was in greater demand since joining the program, but turned down other work to remain with the show.

Bowler guest starred as Gault, the captain of a freighter on the American television series Lost, starting with the season four episode "Ji Yeon".

In 2008, he began a recurring role on Ugly Betty as Connor Owens, corrupt CFO of Meade Publications and the love interest of the series' main villain. Bowler said of his character, "He's got a lot of evil secrets." In December 2009, he was cast as Cooter, a werewolf, in the HBO urban fantasy series True Blood, for that show's third season.

In late 2010, he was announced as the host of Seven Network's The Amazing Race Australia and remained for three seasons. He did not return for the 2019 Network 10 revival of the series, being replaced by Beau Ryan.

He played Hank Rearden in Atlas Shrugged: Part I (2011), the first part of a planned three-part film adaptation of Ayn Rand's novel of the same name. He was also seen in 2011 in The City of Gardens, and the film Killer Elite.

In 2012, Bowler was cast as Richard Burton opposite Lindsay Lohan as Elizabeth Taylor in the biographical TV-movie Liz & Dick for Lifetime in the US.

He was seen in the war drama Gallipoli, released in 2015 on Channel 9, Australia. Bowler was also seen in the psychological action film Swelter, alongside Jean-Claude Van Damme and Alfred Molina; in the sci-fi thriller 400 Days with Brandon Routh and Dane Cook; Lucky Dog with Amy Smart; and the family movie, Zooey to the Max.

In 2020, Bowler appeared in a recurring role in The Baker and the Beauty playing the Australian father of lead character Noa Hamilton, played by Nathalie Kelley.

== Filmography ==
=== Film ===
Year	Title	Role	Notes
2003	Ned	Town priest	
2003	Calling Gerry Molloy	Oliver Laird	
2004	One of the Oldest Con Games	Sam	
2004	Through My Eyes: The Lindy Chamberlain Story	Black Rat	
2007	The Fall of Night	Harry	
2011	Killer Elite	Warwick Cregg	
2011	City of Gardens	Jesus Christ	
2011	Atlas Shrugged: Part I	Hank Rearden	
2011	Steve Niles's Remains	Tom	
2012	I Do	Peter	
2014	Swelter	Cole	
2014	Lucky Dog	Preston Spencer	
2015	400 Days	Walter	
2015	One & Two	Daniel	
2018	Painkillers	Herb Morris	
2019	The Car: Road to Revenge	Rainer	
2019	Guns Akimbo	Degraves	
2020	Bad Impulse	Henry Sharpe	

=== Television ===
Year	Title	Role	Notes
1993–1996	Blue Heelers	Wayne Patterson	Main role (seasons 1–3)
1996	Pacific Drive	Garth Stephens	Episode: "#1.10"
1996–1998	Medivac	Dr. Arch Craven	Main role
1997	Halifax f.p: Someone You Know	Bob Palance	Episode 13
1998	Wildside	Peter Simms	Episode: "#1.27"
1999	Farscape	Shaman Liko	Episode: "That Old Black Magic"
1999	Close Contact	Mike Heyns	Television film
1999–2001	Stingers	Sean Peck	3 episodes
2000–2003	The Mole	Himself (host)	40 episodes
2000	On the Beach	Lt. Peter Holmes	Television film
2000	The Lost World	Montague Fitzsimmonds	Episode: "London Calling"
2001	Finding Hope	Jack	Television film
2001–2002	Something in the Air	Mark Waters	26 episodes
2002	White Collar Blue	Steve Petrovic	Episode: "#1.9"
2002	Always Greener	Greg Steele	11 episodes
2004	McLeod's Daughters	Jarred Wuchowski	Episode: "Fool for Love"
2004–2005	All Saints	Nigel "Mac" MacPherson	20 episodes
2004–present	Border Security: Australia's Front Line	Narrator	105 episodes
2005–2009	Outrageous Fortune	Wolfgang West	Main role
2008	Lost	Captain Gault	3 episodes
2008	Canal Road	Detective Ray Driscoll	10 episodes
2008–2010	Ugly Betty	Connor Owens	17 episodes
2010	True Blood	Cooter	7 episodes
2011	Panic at Rock Island	Jim Quinn	Television film
2011	The Cape	Razer	Episode: "Razer"
2011–2012; 2014	The Amazing Race Australia	Himself (host)	34 episodes
2012	The Great Mint Swindle	Ray Mickelberg	Television film
2012	GCB	Mason Massey	2 episodes
2012	Liz & Dick	Richard Burton	Television film
2013–2015	Defiance	Joshua Nolan	38 episodes
2015	Gallipoli	Lieutenant Colonel William Malone	7 episodes
2015	Getting On	Dr. Ron Rudd	8 episodes
2016	Still Star-Crossed	Damiano Montague	Main role
2016	J.L. Family Ranch	Sheriff Henry Whitlock	Television film
2019	Harrow	Francis Chester	10 episodes
2019	Reef Break	Carter Eastland	6 episodes
2022	Super Volcano	Eric	TV Movie
2022	20.0 Megaquake	Eric	TV Movie
2023	Ice Storm	Eric	TV Movie

=== Video games ===
Year	Title	Role	Notes
2013	Defiance	Chief Lawkeeper Jeb Nolan	Voice
