= Tyler-Jane Mitchel =

New Zealand actress

Tyler Jane
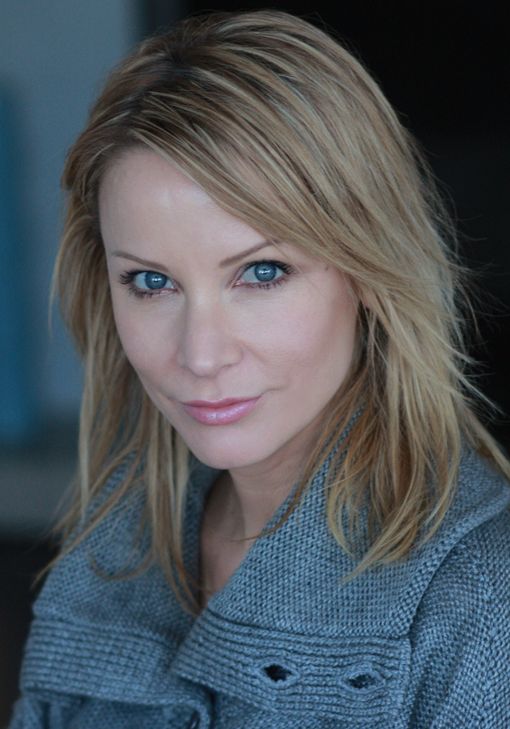
- Mitchel in 2008
- Born: Rebecca Jane Clark; August 15, 1973 (age 53); New Zealand
- Occupations: Actress, producer, broadcaster, voice-over artist
- Years active: 1989–2010

Tyler-Jane Mitchel (born Rebecca Jane Clark, known professionally as Tyler Jane) is a New Zealand actress best known for her role as Sheree Greegan in the New Zealand drama Outrageous Fortune.

== Career ==
Mitchel is an actor, voice over artist, producer and broadcaster. She has starred in several television series in New Zealand, including Amazing Extraordinary Friends and Outrageous Fortune, and worked as a radio newsreader at Auckland’s George FM.

Mitchel has also been an advertising pitchwoman, most notably as the presenter of skin care products brand Elave's 2007 "Nothing to Hide" viral marketing campaign, for which she appeared completely nude in an online commercial as well as on an associated interactive website.

== Personal life ==
She married in 2010.

== Filmography ==
=== Television ===
Year	Title	Role	Notes
1990	The New Adventures of Black Beauty	Kathy	The Sea Horses (S02E04)
1993	Marlin Bay	Allanna Croupier	unknown episodes
1994	One West Waikiki	Valerie credited as Rebecca Jane Clark	"Terminal Island" (S01E03)
1995	Riding High	Vanessa Wilde	Main Role
1995	High Tide	Jilly credited as Rebecca Clark	"The Runaways" (S01E14)
1995	Hercules: The Legendary Journeys	Syreena credited as Rebecca Clark	"The Warrior Princess" (S01E09)
1995	Hercules: The Legendary Journeys	Archer #1 credited as Rebecca Clark	"The Mother of All Monsters" (S02E07)
1996	One West Waikiki	Valerie credited as Rebecca Clark	"The South Seas Connection" (S02E10)
1996	Hercules: The Legendary Journeys	Head Archer credited as Rebecca Clark	"Monster Child in the Promised Land" (S03E06)
1999	Stingers	Kelly	"The Favour" (S02E10)
2005	The Market	Alison	Season 1, Episode 4
2006-2007	Amazing Extraordinary Friends	ICE	Series regular, unknown episodes
2007	Orange Roughies	Rickie Delores	Season 2, Episode 12
2007-2010	Outrageous Fortune	Sheree Greegan	Series regular, 34 episodes

=== Film ===
Year	Title	Role	Notes
1989	Wait Until Spring, Bandini	Gertie credited as Rebecca Clark	Drama
2000	Fragments	Sara	Drama - Short film
