= Outrageous Fortune (TV series) =

New Zealand television series

- The Season 6 title card
- Genre: Comedy drama Black comedy Crime drama Family drama
- Created by: James Griffin; Rachel Lang
- Starring: Robyn Malcolm; Grant Bowler; Antony Starr; Siobhan Marshall; Antonia Prebble; Frank Whitten; Kirk Torrance
- Opening theme: "Gutter Black" by Hello Sailor
- Ending theme: "Gutter Black" by Hello Sailor
- Composers: Liquid Studios; Joel Haines
- Country of origin: New Zealand
- Original language: English
- No. of seasons: 6
- No. of episodes: 107 (including 2-hour movie) (list of episodes)

Production
- Executive producers: John Barnett; Simon Bennett; Rachel Lang; James Griffin
- Producers: Mike Smith; John Laing
- Cinematography: Wayne Vinten; Marty Smith
- Editors: Margot Francis; Nicola Smith; Allanah Milne; Bryan Shaw
- Running time: 42 minutes
- Production company: South Pacific Pictures

Original release
- Network: TV3
- Release: 12 July 2005 – 9 November 2010

Related
- Westside; Honest; Scoundrels

Outrageous Fortune is a New Zealand family comedy crime drama television series, which ran from 12 July 2005 to 9 November 2010 on TV3. The series followed the lives of the career criminal West family after the matriarch, Cheryl (Robyn Malcolm), decided the family should go straight and abide by the law. The show was created by James Griffin and Rachel Lang and produced by South Pacific Pictures.

Like the show itself, episodes took their names from Shakespeare quotations. The show concluded after 6 seasons and 107 episodes. The primary cast for the show's run consisted of Robyn Malcolm, Antony Starr, Siobhan Marshall, Antonia Prebble, Frank Whitten and Kirk Torrance; Grant Bowler appeared in a sporadic role throughout the show's first five seasons.

The show premiered on 12 July 2005 and was welcomed by high acclaim. It won many of the major categories in the New Zealand television awards for its first 4 years, with Malcolm's performance warmly recognised by most New Zealand reviewers. Following the show's success, Outrageous Fortune received worldwide interest and in 2008 was adapted for United Kingdom television as Honest and again in 2010 for United States residents as Scoundrels, neither of which were renewed after their debut seasons.

In 2014, TV3 announced a six-part prequel miniseries entitled Westside that chronicles the lives of Ted and Rita West in 1970s Auckland. Initially airing in May 2015, Westside was renewed for a second season in 2016; then repeatedly again up to the sixth and final series which concluded in November 2020.

== Overview ==
The series followed the lives of the West family, headed by Cheryl (Robyn Malcolm) and Wolf West (Grant Bowler) in their working class West Auckland home. The family relied on crime for an income, with Cheryl working at a stolen goods shop. When Wolf is incarcerated, Cheryl informs her family, twin sons Van and Jethro (Antony Starr), daughters Pascalle (Siobhan Marshall) and Loretta (Antonia Prebble), and "retired" Patriarch Ted (Frank Whitten), that they will obey the law and avoid committing any more crimes. Show creator Rachel Lang described the series as an "upside down morality tale and a family story about a woman who tries to make her family go straight."

== Cast and characters ==
The show's initial seasons focused primarily on the West family. However, as the seasons developed, the focus branched out onto the family's affiliates and enemies.

- Robyn Malcolm as Cheryl West (seasons 1–6), the family matriarch who, after husband Wolf gets imprisoned, decides to make her family go straight. Throughout the series, she goes through numerous jobs before starting a lingerie business. While fiercely devoted to her loved ones, her stubborn and combative personality regularly leads them to butt heads.
- Antony Starr as Jethro and Van West (seasons 1–6), identical twin brothers with extremely different personalities. While Jethro is a slick, amoral lawyer, Van is a dim but generally well-meaning stoner.
- Siobhan Marshall as Pascalle West (seasons 1–6), the eldest daughter of the West family. She is a statuesque yet shallow-minded blonde renowned throughout the West Auckland community for her beauty. Despite being introduced as extremely spoiled and self-absorbed, she gradually grows into a stronger, caring woman.
- Antonia Prebble as Loretta West (seasons 1–6), the youngest member of the West family as well as the most intelligent. Calculating and remorseless, Loretta is utterly ruthless in pursuit of her goals. Despite her twisted nature, she is nonetheless loyal to her family and proves indispensable in saving them from dangers both from outside and within. By the series end, she is a mother and a wife.
  - Prebble also briefly played Rita West, Loretta's grandmother and Ted's late wife, in flashback scenes during season 4. She would reprise the role as Rita in the prequel series Westside (2015-2020) as a lead character.
- Frank Whitten as Ted West (seasons 1–6), Wolf's retired safe cracker father. While he cares for his family, his eccentricities and disregard for the law in general frequently jeopardize their well-being.
- Kirk Torrance as Detective Sergeant Wayne Judd (seasons 1–6), initially the West family's nemesis, later one of the family.
- Stella King as Jane West (seasons 3–6), Loretta's daughter with Hayden Peters
- Grant Bowler as Wolfgang West (seasons 1–2, 4; guest; 3, 5), the West family patriarch and the series' main antagonist. While he cares for his wife and kids, his fixation on foiling their attempts to go straight at any cost constantly brings them into harm's way.
- Tammy Davis as Jared "Munter" Mason (recurring seasons 1–2, regular 3–6), Van's loyal best friend and co-owner of the handyman business, the Tool Guys.
- Nicole Whippy as Kasey (recurring seasons 1–2, regular 3–6), Cheryl's best friend and eventual wife of Munter.
- Claire Chitham as Aurora Bay (seasons 2–3), Van West's girlfriend who dies after being hit by a bus.
- Shane Cortese as Hayden Peters (recurring seasons 2–3, regular seasons 4–6), Jane's father. Later business partner and husband of Loretta.
- Tyler-Jane Mitchel as Sheree Greegan (guest seasons 3, 6, regular seasons 4–5), Wolfgang West's girlfriend.
- Rohan Glynn as Detective Glenn Hickey, Sergeant Judd's quirky sidekick (recurring series 1–3).

== Production ==
Following the dwindling numbers on Rachel Lang's series Mercy Peak, she decided one way to attract an audience was to feature abrasive and in-your-face characters, something she promised herself would feature in her next show. When Lang heard a radio report on the low median number of women's income, she pondered why they did not turn to crime and realised the potential for a television show.

== Ratings ==
Season	Episodes	Year	Funding	Viewers
1	13	2005	$5.3 Million	263,000
2	17 (Including Christmas Telemovie)	2006	$7.6 Million	311,000
3	22	2007	$9.9 Million	381,000
4	18	2008	$8.1 Million	453,000
5	19	2009	$9.1 Million	407,000
6	18	2010	$8.6 Million	520,000

== Season synopsis ==
=== Season One (2005) ===
When career criminal Wolfgang "Wolf" West is jailed for four years for assorted criminal acts, his wife Cheryl makes the decision that the family will get honest employment, instead of continuing their life of crime. Wolf is not pleased about this, but there's not much he can do from jail. Cheryl is initially disillusioned by her attempts at earning a legal living, but she and a couple of her friends start a business called "Hoochie Mama" making and selling sexy underwear, all the while resisting the newly found attraction of policeman, Wayne Judd. The West children, Jethro, Van, Pascalle, and Loretta, all struggle to cope with the newfound rules in their own ways, while Ted struggles to come to terms with his late wife.

=== Season Two (2006) ===
Wolf has been released on home detention. He has no intention of keeping to Cheryl's new rules on life. Judd is determined to tear him away from Cheryl, and attempts to entice Wolf to break his parole so that he is returned to prison. Wolf escapes home detention and Judd moves in, much to the horror of the children. Pascalle starts to date Pakistani doctor Bruce, Van finds the love of his life, Aurora, and Loretta starts to date much older man Hayden. Jethro shocks his mother when he reveals he is still a criminal and only doing law to learn how to break the law more successfully. The season ends on Wolf framing Judd for a robbery he committed.

=== Outrageous Fortune: The Movie (2006 Telemovie) ===
This one-off two-hour TV movie followed on from season 2.

The West family, along with Aurora, Eric and Munter go camping at Tutaekuri Bay, a magical place where they have gone camping every year at Christmas. The Māori-language name Tutaekuri means "dog shit"; Tutaekuri Bay is a fictional place for the purpose of the movie.

=== Season Three (2007) ===
Cheryl is still battling to keep her family on the straight and narrow. Both the men in her life are inside – Wolf after turning himself in to the cops as part of his master plan to frame Judd; Judd from being framed by Wolf. She borrows money from Gary Savage to pay for a better lawyer for Judd, which results in his release, but the debt causes a strain in their relationship. Aurora dies in a road accident while trying to hide her ex-boyfriend's drugs after Van calls the police on him, spiraling Van into depression. Loretta is outraged when Hayden edits their film to be more explicit for commercial gain, breaks up with him as punishment, and harasses him after he flatly accepts it, instead of trying to win her back. This escalates until he leaves, and she burns down his house. After Hayden has left, she discovers she is pregnant by him. Bruce breaks up with Pascalle after he sees her (edited to be more explicit than she actually performed) porn movie. Jethro finds love with Danielle, a single mother and the ex-wife of Gary. Ted becomes suspicious of Gary and tracks down Wolf, only to find Gary is Wolf's half brother. Over the season Munter develops a relationship with Kasey and marries her in the season finale.

=== Season Four (2008) ===
The family is brought together when Cheryl talks Loretta out of adopting out her baby, whom she names Jane. Cheryl having broken up with Judd, starts to have feelings for Wolf again, who is in a rocky relationship with the much younger ex-stripper, named Sheree Greegan. Sheree's dodgy brother Nicky arrives and starts a relationship with Loretta. Pascalle returns from a trip abroad, having married the older and wealthy Milt. Milt eventually dies, leaving Pascalle a fortune. Sheree and Nicky conspire to get access to her money by having Nicky break up with Loretta and start a relationship with Pascalle. Wolf attempts to earn some money by facilitating a shipment of drugs for Nicky in a container, which Jethro steals to ransom, but Van and Munter destroy the drugs. Jethro is forced to run away when he takes the blame for the drugs being destroyed. Van starts an affair with Sheree. Loretta and Jethro set Wolf up for burglary, and Cheryl returns to Judd, becoming pregnant. Sheree also becomes pregnant, either by Van, Wolf, or Jethro (it is strongly implied that it is Jethro but not confirmed). After Hayden's sister Bernadette finds out about baby Jane, she forces Hayden to return to care for his child. Ted courts and at the end of the season, marries the scheming Ngaire Munroe, the widow of his former gang mate, Lefty. Pascalle becomes engaged to the dodgy Nicky much to her family's disbelief.

=== Season Five (2009) ===
Zane Gerard (Charles Mesure) fires three shots at Cheryl and Pascalle after being stabbed in the neck by Cheryl.

Detective Sergeant Zane Gerard becomes a fixture in the West's lives, due to his past involvement with Sheree and Nicky Greegan. Van is pressured into becoming a police informant (behind the backs of all), infuriating Sheree when she finds out. Jethro starts up a business selling legal party pills. Nicky truly falls for Pascalle, enraging Sheree, who makes off with Pascalle's millions and attempts to murder Van (to claim life insurance). After a rogue job robbing a Chinese money lender, Pascalle breaks up with Nicky. Loretta gets back together with Hayden and the two decide to marry as so they get custody of Jane. Ted ends up in prison for robbery and is helped out by Nicky, causing him and Pascalle to get back together. Near the end of the season, Cheryl has a stillbirth. The season ends with Gerard trying to arrest Pascalle for offensive language, resulting in a brawl (in the midst of Loretta and Hayden's wedding), only to be stabbed in the neck by Cheryl and turning round to fire three bullets in her direction.

=== Season Six (2010) ===
Season 6 returned with TV presenter John Campbell appearing as a news reporter in a small cameo. The season was the last for the series, and the series reached its 100th episode. Ten-second promos started airing for the show on 14 June. The West family house set was on show in Auckland Museum for six months after the series ends.

In the aftermath of Loretta and Hayden's wedding, it was revealed that Pascalle was shot but survived, Cheryl was arrested for assault with a deadly weapon, Munter, Kasey, Van, and Ted were arrested for various crimes, and Eric, who returned in the previous series, had taken residence in the Wests' home. Over the course of the first episode, Detective Sergeant Zane Gerard dies, leaving Cheryl to be charged with his murder. Van starts to see his lawyer, Bailey, only to learn she is dating Jethro. Loretta opens up a brothel, while Nicky escapes prison and tries to convince Pascalle to run away with him. The two break up, and Sheree reveals where her children are, with Van becoming a part-time father to them. Judd and Pascalle develop feelings for each other and start an affair, disgusting Ted. Cheryl's charges are dropped and she is devastated to learn about Judd and Pascalle, finally forgiving him in the season finale. Pascalle and Judd leave town, while Van marries the Russian Elena. Loretta, Hayden, and Jane continue to be a happy family, and Jethro fulfills his mother's fixation.

== International broadcasts ==
Australia

- Outrageous Fortune was shown weekly on the Pay-TV channel W.
- It was shown on the Nine Network during the summer non-ratings period.
- Season 5 did screen on Network Ten at 21:30 on Friday nights over the summer period in early 2010 but was cancelled halfway through. In an interview with Andrew Mercado in April, Robyn Malcolm confirmed that this was because New Zealand-produced shows count against the quota of Australian-made shows that networks can show and series 5 was used as a filler during the non-rating season. Series 5 was later again show on ARENA in November 2010. Network 10 continued series 5 from 21 June 22:00 Monday nights.
- Australia Network broadcasts Outrageous Fortune to a wide Pay-TV audience in the Asia/Pacific Region.

USA

- Outrageous Fortune is currently available for viewing on Hulu and Amazon Prime.

Ireland

- TV3 Ireland showed the first series during 2006 and started showing the second series in March 2007 (22:00 Thursdays).

Canada

- Began airing in 2007 on Super Channel.

UK

- Shown on Living in the United Kingdom starting on Tuesday 6 March 2007 at 10 pm. As of June 2012, it is currently being shown on CBS Drama.
- It is available on STV Player.

== Home media ==
Series	DVD release dates	Special features
Series	Region 4	Special features
1	8 December 2005 (NZ); 1 March 2008 (AUS)	Behind the scenes; Cast and crew photo slide show
2	15 March 2007 (NZ); 3 May 2008 (AUS)	Xmas special telemovie; Blooper outtakes; Photo gallery
3	21 March 2008 (NZ); 2 August 2008 (AUS)	Loretta's blog; Photo gallery
4	13 November 2008 (NZ); 30 June 2009 (AUS)	Audio commentaries; Outtakes; Photo gallery
5	15 October 2009 (NZ); 12 May 2010 (AUS)	Audio commentaries; Photo gallery
6	17 November 2010 (NZ); 11 May 2011 (AUS)	Audio commentaries

=== Box sets ===
Title	DVD release dates	Special features
Title	Region 4	Special features
Outrageous Fortune — The Choice Series 1–3	1 November 2008 (AUS)	Christmas telemovie; Blooper outtakes; Photo galleries; Behind the scenes; Loretta's blog
Outrageous Fortune — The Complete Series 1–5	13 October 2010 (AUS)	Christmas telemovie; Audio commentaries; Behind the scenes; Cast and crew photo slide show; Bloopers; Outtakes; Photo galleries; Loretta's blog
Outrageous Fortune — Serial Offenders – The Complete Collection	17 November 2010 (NZ); 2 November 2011 (AUS)	Bonus disc: Interviews; Down-trou moments; Pascalle's "Best Bag Ever" advertorial; Rita & Ted home videos; Crane timelapse; Tamcam

=== Other ===
Title	DVD release dates
Title	Region 4
Outrageous Fortune: Revealed	6 July 2011 (NZ)
Outrageous Fortune — A Very Westie Christmas	7 December 2011 (NZ)

== Music ==
Two compilation soundtracks have been released for the show, and both draw on New Zealand music. The title track for the series is Hello Sailor's "Gutter Black".

== Awards ==
- New Zealand TV Awards for 2005

- Best Actor: Antony Starr
- Best Actress : Robyn Malcolm
- Best Director: Mark Beesley
- Best Drama
- Best Editing: Nicola Smith
- Best Script: Rachel Lang

- TV GUIDE Best on the Box

- Best Actress: Robyn Malcolm
- Best Drama

- Woman's Day Reader's Choice

- Favourite Female Personality: Robyn Malcolm

- Air NZ Screen Award 2006

- Best Drama Programme for episode 4
- Best Drama Series

- Air New Zealand Screen Awards for 2007

- Best Actor: Antony Starr
- Best Actress: Robyn Malcolm
- Best Drama Programme
- Best Supporting Actor: Frank Whitten.

- 2008 Qantas Film and Television Awards

- Achievement in Editing – Drama/Comedy Programme: Bryan Shaw
- Best Script – Drama/Comedy Programme: Rachel Lang
- Performance by an Actor in General Television: Antony Starr
- Performance by an Actress in General Television: Robyn Malcolm
- Performance by a Supporting Actor in General Television: Tammy Davis
- Performance by a Supporting Actress in General Television: Antonia Prebble
- Sony Achievement in Directing – Drama/Comedy Programme: Mark Beesley.

== Adaptations ==
Versions of the series have been produced in the United Kingdom and United States. The British remake, Honest was produced for ITV by the independent production company Greenlit. The first episode aired on 9 January 2008, and the show ran for a single season.

The American remake, titled Scoundrels, premiered in June 2010 to mixed reviews. A previous adaptation developed by Rob Thomas, entitled Good Behavior, failed to be picked up for broadcast by any networks. After its initial 8-episode run, Scoundrels was not picked up for another season.

Westside, a prequel to Outrageous Fortune, screened its first season on TV3 in 2015 and the second season in 2016. Set in the 1970/80s, Antonia Prebble who played Loretta West stars as Rita West, Loretta's grandmother. Westside ran for six seasons ending in November 2020.
