= 2012 New Zealand Television Awards =

Awards in New Zealand

- Awarded for: Excellence in New Zealand television and television journalism.
- Date: 3 November 2012
- Location: Langham hotel, Auckland
- Country: New Zealand
- Presented by: Think TV
- Website: http://televisionawards.co.nz

Television/radio coverage
- Network: TV ONE

The 2012 New Zealand Television Awards were the new name of the New Zealand television industry awards, following the demise of the Aotearoa Film and Television Awards. The awards were held on Saturday 3 November at The Great Room of the Langham hotel in Auckland, New Zealand, with highlights screening on TV ONE on Sunday 4 November. The New Zealand Television Awards took a similar format to the previous Qantas Television Awards, honouring excellence in New Zealand television and television journalism. This was the final New Zealand television awards presentation organised by Think TV, after Television New Zealand withdrew its support in 2013.

== Nominees and winners ==
There are 46 categories, including the new categories for One-Off Drama and Breaking News. Finalists were announced on 26 September 2012. Entries cover the broadcast period of 1 August 2011 to 15 July 2012. The general television awards were dominated by true crime drama Siege, with five awards, while the news and current affairs section was dominated by TV3, with eight awards.

Winners are listed first and highlighted in boldface.

Key
† – Non-technical award
‡ – Technical award

=== News and current affairs ===
Best Scheduled News Programme†	Best Coverage Breaking News†
**3 News**; ONE News; Tonight	**ONE News, Caterton Ballooning Tragedy**; 3 News, Christchurch Earthquakes December 2011; 3 News, Ewen Macdonald Verdict
Best News OR Current Affairs Presenter†	Best News Reporting†
**Julian Wilcox, Native Affairs**; Mike McRoberts, 3 News; John Campbell, Campbell Live	**Duncan Garner & Patrick Gower, 3 News**; Amanda Gillies, 3 News; Heather du Plessis-Allan, ONE News
Best Current Affairs Reporting for a Weekly Programme OR One-Off Current Affairs Special†	Best Current Affairs Reporting for a Daily Programme†
**Mark Crysell & Julie Clothier, Sunday**; Melanie Reid, 60 Minutes; Janet McIntyre, Max Adams & Chris Cooke, Sunday; Janet McIntyre & Carolyne Meng-Yee, Sunday	**Gill Higgins & Chris Lynch, Close Up**; Tristram Clayton, Campbell Live; John Campbell, Campbell Live
Best Current Affairs Series†	Investigation of the Year†
**60 Minutes**; Campbell Live; Sunday	**Melanie Reid & Eugene Bingham, 60 Minutes "The Eye of the Storm"**; John Hudson & Chris Cooke, Sunday, "Steel Trap"; John Campbell and Pip Keane, Campbell Live, "Friends: John Banks & Kim Dotcom"
Journalist of the Year†	Best News Camera‡
Finalists are the winners of the four reporting categories: **Melanie Reid, "The Eye of the Storm", 60 Minutes**; Duncan Garner, "Secret Tea Tapes", 3 News; Julie Clothier, "Cherry Blossom Tragedy", Sunday; Gill Higgins, "Online Predators", Close Up	**Phil Johnson, 3 News**; Bob Grieve, 3 News; James Marshall, ONE News
Best Current Affairs Camera‡	Best News Editing‡
**Daniel Grade, 60 Minutes**; Chris Brown, 20/20; Warren Armstrong, Campbell Live	**Luis Portillo, Breakfast**; Brent Walters, ONE News; Rebecca O'Sullivan, 3 News
Best Current Affairs Editing‡	Best Graphics‡
**Bob Grieve, 60 Minutes**; Paul Sparkes, Close Up; Andrew Gibb, Close Up	**Vinay Ranchhod, "Devil in the Detail" (TV ONE)**; Vinay Ranchhod, Gambling RP (TV ONE); *Ben Ashby, Steel Trap (TV ONE)

=== General television ===
Best Drama Series†	Best One-Off Drama†
**Go Girls, Season 4, South Pacific Pictures**; Underbelly NZ: Land Of The Long Green Cloud, Screentime NZ Ltd; Nothing Trivial, South Pacific Pictures	**Siege, Screentime NZ Ltd**; Bliss – the beginning of Katherine Mansfield, MF Films; Rage, Tom Scott Productions
Best Comedy OR Comedy Series†	Best Māori Language Programme†
**Hounds, The Down Low Concept**; 7 Days MediaWorks / The Down Low Concept; Wilson Dixon: The New Zealand Tour, Satellite Media	**Whare Taonga, Scottie Productions Limited**; Kia Ora Molweni, George Andrews Productions; Tamaki Paenga Hira, Māori Television
Best Presenter: Te Reo Māori†	Best Children’s/Youth Programme†
**Julian Wilcox, Native Affairs**; Pānia Papa, AKO; Piripi Taylor Te Kaea	**Let's Get Inventin', Luke Nola**; Girl vs. Boy, KHF Media; The Erin Simpson Show, Whitebait TV
Best Information Series†	Best Entertainment OR Event Programme†
**Global Radar, Jam TV**; Neighbourhood, Satellite Media; The Nutters Club, Top Shelf Productions	**Vodafone NZ Music Awards 2011, MediaWorks**; 2012 Comedy Gala MediaWorks; The Sitting, Top Shelf Productions
Best Factual Series†	Best Observational Reality Series†
**Radar Across the Pacific, Alexander Behse / Zeitgeist Productions**; Intrepid Journeys, Jam TV; Funny Roots, Two Heads	**SPCA Rescue, "Christchurch Earthquake Special", Imagination Television**; Songs From the Inside, Awa Films Ltd; Rescue 1, Great Southern Television
Best Constructed Reality Series†	Best Performance by an Actress†
**The Food Truck, Two Heads**; Missing Pieces, Eyeworks New Zealand; Marae DIY, Screentime NZ Ltd	**Sara Wiseman, What Really Happened: Votes for Women**; Kate Elliott, BLISS – the beginning of Katherine Mansfield; Amanda Billing, Shortland Street
Best Performance by a Supporting Actress†	Best Performance by an Actor†
**Miriama Smith, Siege**; Miranda Harcourt, Tangiwai – A Love Story; Sarah Pierse, BLISS – the beginning of Katherine Mansfield	**Mark Mitchinson, Siege**; Craig Parker, Shackleton's Captain; Ryan O'Kane, Rage
Best Performance by a Supporting Actor†	Best Presenter – Entertainment/Factual†
**Mick Rose, Tangiwai – A Love Story**; Peter Elliott, BLISS – the beginning of Katherine Mansfield; Mike Minogue, Rage	**Matai Smith, Homai Te Pakipaki**; Andrew Lumsden, Global Radar; Paul Henry, Would I Lie To You?
Best Script – Drama/Comedy†	Best Director – Drama/Comedy†
**John Banas, Siege**; Paula Boock & Donna Malane, Tangiwai – A Love Story; Tom Scott and Grant O'Fee, Rage	**Fiona Samuel, BLISS – the beginning of Katherine Mansfield**; Mike Smith, Siege; Danny Mulheron, Rage
Best Director – Entertainment/Factual†	Best Multi-camera Direction‡
**Julie Christie, The Block NZ**; Peter Young, Get Fresh with Al Brown; Mike Smith, Underbelly NZ: Land Of The Long Green Cloud	**Mitchell Hawkes, Vodafone NZ Music Awards 2011**; Robert Hagen, Dame Kiri Te Kanawa: A Gala Concert; Mitchell Hawkes, Wilson Dixon: The New Zealand Tour
Best Cinematography Drama/Comedy‡	Images & Sound Best Editing Drama/Comedy‡
**David Paul, Tangiwai – A Love Story**; DJ Stipsen, Siege; David Paul, Rage	**Margot Francis, BLISS – the beginning of Katherine Mansfield**; Margot Francis, Siege; Jono Woodford Robinson, Rage
Best Original Music‡	Best Sound Design‡
**Don McGlashan, BLISS – the beginning of Katherine Mansfield**; Joel Haines, Strongman – The Tragedy; Peter Hobbs, Tangiwai – A Love Story	**Chris Burt, Siege**; Dick Reade, Strongman – The Tragedy; Phil Burton, Chris Hiles, Don Paulin, Tangiwai – A Love Story
Best Production Design‡	Best Costume Design‡
**John Harding, Tangiwai – A Love Story**; Images & Sound, Shackleton's Captain; Tracey Collins, BLISS – the beginning of Katherine Mansfield	**Sarah Voon Go Girls, season 4**; Nic Smillie, Tangiwai – A Love Story; Kirsty Cameron, BLISS – the beginning of Katherine Mansfield
Best Make-Up Design‡	
**Linda Wall, Tangiwai – A Love Story**; Tracey Sharman, Strongman – The Tragedy; Vanessa Hurley & Stefan Knight, Go Girls, season 4	

=== Documentary ===
Best Popular Documentary†	Best Feature OR Drama Documentary†
**The Green Chain, Meg Douglas & Kathleen Mantel / Scottie Productions Limited**; Rhodes, Actor Singer, Robert Hagen / Arts and Entertainment Productions; Inside Child Poverty, Red Sky Film & Television Ltd	**Strongman – The Tragedy, Paula McTaggart and Gaylene Preston / A Bigger Picture**; When a City Falls – the people's story, Gerard Smyth & Alice Shannon / Frank Film; Shackleton's Captain, James Heyward & Andy Salek / Making Movies
Best Director Documentary†	Best Cinematography – Documentary/Factual‡
**Gerard Smyth/Alice Shannon, When a City Falls – the people's story**; Leanne Pooley, Shackleton's Captain; Bryan Bruce, Inside Child Poverty	**Simon Baumfield, Shackleton's Captain**; Thomas Burstyn CSC & Chris Brokensha, Strongman – The Tragedy; Mark Chamberlin, Neighbourhood
Best Editing – Documentary/Factual‡	
**Ken Sparks, Richard Lord, When a City Falls – the people's story**; Tim Woodhouse, Shackleton's Captain; Mark Albiston, Blakey	
