= 2011 Aotearoa Film & Television Awards =

Awards in New Zealand

- Awarded for: Excellence in New Zealand film, television and television journalism
- Date: 12 November 2011
- Location: Viaduct Events Centre, Auckland
- Country: New Zealand
- Presented by: New Zealand Television Broadcasters Council and the Screen Directors Guild of New Zealand
- First award: 2005

The 2011 Aotearoa Film & Television Awards were the 2011 iteration of the annual New Zealand film and television awards, which have assumed different names over the years.

== Background and description ==
After previously being known as the Qantas Film and Television Awards, the awards were renamed to the Aotearoa Film and Television Awards in August 2011.

The event was held at the Viaduct Events Centre in Auckland, New Zealand, on the evening of Saturday 12 November, with the crafts awards presented at an earlier luncheon on Thursday 10 November.

== Nominees and winners ==
The Aotearoa Film and Television Craft Awards were announced on Thursday 10 November 2011, and the Aotearoa Film and Television Awards were announced on Saturday 12 November 2011.

Winners are listed first and highlighted in boldface.

Key
† – Non-technical award
‡ – Technical award

=== News and Current Affairs ===
Best News†	Best News or Current Affairs Presenter†
Sponsored by Qantas: **One News (TV One)**; 3 News (TV3); Tonight (TV One)	**Hilary Barry, 3 News "Christchurch Earthquake" (TV3)**; John Campbell, Campbell Live "The Christchurch Earthquake" (TV3); Peter Williams, One News "Pike River" (TV One)
Journalist of the Year†	Best News Reporting†
**Hamish Clark, 3 News "Christchurch Earthquake" (TV3)**	**Hamish Clark, 3 News "Christchurch Earthquake" (TV3)**; Guyon Espiner, One News "Garrett" (TV One); Duncan Garner & Tony Reid, 3 News "Brash Rolls Hide" (TV3)
Best Current Affairs Reporting for a weekly programme or one-off current affairs special†	Best Current Affairs Reporting for a daily programme†
**Amanda Millar & Joanne Mitchell, Sunday "Innocent" (TV One)**; Janet McIntyre, Sunday "A Tale of Two Light Bulbs" (TV One); Sonya Wilson, 20/20 "Taken" (TV2)	**Mark Crysell & Kate McCallum, Close Up "Webster" (TV One)**; John Campbell, Campbell Live "Please tell us what is happening to our homes? Christchurch Earthquake" (TV3); Gill Higgins & Kate McCallum, Close Up "Chaston 1" (TV One)
Best Current Affairs Series†	Investigation of the Year†
**Native Affairs ((Māori Television))**; 60 Minutes (TV3); Sunday (TV One)	**John Campbell, Pip Keane & Claudine MacLean – Campbell Live "The Tsunami Aid Money Investigation" (TV3)**; Paula Penfold & Eugene Bingham "Secrets and Lies" (TV3); Rachel Stace & John Hagen "A Rotten Shame" (TV One)
Best News Camera	Best Current Affairs Camera
**Cameron Williams, 3 News "Niger Series/Airline Investigation" (TV3)**; Christie Douglas, 3 News "Pyne Gould Corp. Building Collapse/Christchurch Quake: Pyne Gould Building Flattened" (TV3); Bob Grieve, 3 News "Hoar/Singer/Students" (TV3)	**Martin Anderson, 20/20 "Rite of Passage" (TV2)**; Chris Brown, 20/20 "Breaking Back" (TV2); Leander Scott-Donelan, Close Up "Pheasant" (TV One)
Best News Editing	Best Current Affairs Editing
**Paul Sparkes, One News "Special Report CCTV" (TV One)**; Sarah Rowan, 3 News "Pike River Memorial/Amy Gilbert/Commonwealth" (TV3); Paul Sparkes, One News "Special Report 1080" (TV One)	**Nick Reid, 20/20 "Sitting on a Killer" (TV2)**; Will Kong, Sunday "Officer Down" (TV One); Elisabeth Topping, Sunday "Big on the Blogosphere" (TV One)

=== General Television ===
Best Drama Programme†	Best Comedy or Comedy Series†
Sponsored by Images & Sound: **This Is Not My Life (TV One)**; Outrageous Fortune (TV3); What Really Happened: Waitangi (TV One)	Sponsored by NZ On Air: **7 Days, The Down Low Concept / MediaworksTV (TV3)**; A Night at the Classic (TV2); Super City (TV3)
Best Māori Language Programme†	Best Children's/Youth Programme†
Sponsored by Māori Language Commission/Te Māngai Pāho: **E Tū Kahikatea (Māori TV)**; Katerina Te Heikoko Mataira ((Māori Television)); Kowhao Rau ((Māori Television))	**Kaitangata Twitch ((Māori Television))**; The Amazing Extraordinary Friends (TV2); What Now 30th Birthday Show (TV2)
Best Information Programme†	Best Entertainment/Factual Entertainment Programme†
**Whare Maori ((Māori Television))**; North (TV One); The Politically Incorrect Guide to Teenagers (TV One)	Sponsored by Auckland Council: **MasterChef New Zealand, (TV One)**; Making Tracks (C4); The New Zealand Variety Show (TV One)
Best Multi-cam Broadcast†	Best Observational Reality Series†
Sponsored by Kordia: **Rise Up Christchurch – Global Telethon ((Māori Television))**; ANZAC Day 2011 – Kotahi Te Wairua ((Māori Television)); Polynesian Blue Pacific Music Awards (TV One)	**The Secret Lives of Dancers (TV3)**; Intrepid Journeys (TV One); Rescue 1 (TV2)
Best Constructed Reality Series†	Best Performance by an Actress†
**Missing Pieces (TV3)**; Are You My Tribe? (TV One); Bigger, Better, Faster, Stronger (TV3)	**Madeleine Sami, Super City (TV3)**; Miriama McDowell, This Is Not My Life (TV One); Tandi Wright, This Is Not My Life (TV One)
Best Performance by a Supporting Actress†	Best Performance by an Actor†
**Rena Owen, Shortland Street (TV2)**; Nathalie Boltt, Bloodlines (TV One); Fern Sutherland, The Almighty Johnsons (TV3)	**Mark Mitchinson, Bloodlines (TV One)**; Jarod Rawiri, What Really Happened: Waitangi (TV One); Antony Starr, Spies And Lies (TV One)
Best Performance by a Supporting Actor†	Best Presenter – Entertainment/Factual†
**Craig Hall, Bloodlines (TV One)**; Dean O'Gorman, Nights in the Gardens of Spain (TV One); Craig Parker, Legend of the Seeker (Prime)	**Jeremy Corbett, 7 Days (TV3)**; Nigel Latta, Politically Incorrect Guide to Teenagers (TV One); Marcus Lush, North (TV One)
Best Script – Drama/Comedy†	Images & Sound Best Director – Drama/Comedy†
**James Griffin, Outrageous Fortune (TV3)**; Paula Boock & Donna Malane, Bloodlines (TV One); Madeleine Sami & Thomas Sainsbury, Super City(TV3)	**Peter Burger, Bloodlines – Screentime Ltd (TV One)**; Peter Burger, What Really Happened: Waitangi (TV One); Britta Johnstone, Stolen (TV3)
Best Director – Entertainment/Factual†	Best Multi-camera Direction‡
**Dean Cornish & Nick Dwyer, Making Tracks (C4)**; James Anderson, The Food Truck (TV One); Karen Mackenzie & Michael Bennett, Whare Māori episode 1 "Kainga" ((Māori Television))	Sponsored by Kordia: **Darryl McEwen, MasterChef New Zealand (TV One)**; Nigel Carpenter & Mitchell Hawkes, Band Together for Canterbury (TV3); Rob McLaughlin, One's Countdown to New Year (TV One)
Best Cinematography Drama/Comedy‡	Best Editing Drama/Comedy‡
**Kevin Riley, Legend of the Seeker (Prime)**; Andrew Commis, This Is Not My Life (TV One); David Paul, Reservoir Hill: Everyone Lies (TV2)	Sponsored by Images & Sound: **Allanah Milne, Stolen (TV3)**; Paul Maxwell, This Is Not My Life (TV One); Bryan Shaw, The Almighty Johnsons (TV3)
Best Original Music‡	Best Sound Design‡
**Don McGlashan, This Is Not My Life (TV One)**; Sean Donnelly & Victoria Kelly, The Almighty Johnsons (TV3); Gareth Farr, Panic at Rock Island (TV2)	**Chris Burt, Legend of the Seeker (Prime)**; Phil Burton, Don Paulin & Mark Cornish, Panic at Rock Island (TV2); Tom Miskin, James Hayday, Mike Bayliss & Steve Finnigan, Stolen (TV3)
Best Production Design‡	Best Contribution to Design‡
**Tracey Collins, This Is Not My Life (TV One)**; Tracey Collins, What Really Happened: Waitangi (TV One); Gary Mackay, Go Girls (TV2)	**Jane Holland, Legend of the Seeker (Prime)**; Katrina Hodge, Outrageous Fortune (TV3); Peter McCully, This Is Not My Life (TV One)

=== Documentary ===
Best Popular Documentary or Documentary Series†	Best Arts/Festival/Feature Documentary†
**Jesus The Cold Case (TV One)**; The Banker, The Escorts, and The $18 Million (TV3); October 15 ((Māori Television))	**I am the River ((Māori Television))**; Gordonia, Operation 8
Best Director Documentary†	Best Cinematography Documentary/Factual†
**Annie Goldson, Brother Number One**; John Bates, 50 Years of Television (Prime); Merata Mita, Saving Grace ((Māori Television))	**David Paul, The Banker, The Escorts, and The $18 Million (TV3)**; Jacob Bryant, North (TV One); Renaud Maire, I am the River ((Māori Television))
Best Editing Documentary/Factual‡	
**Annie Collins, The Waterfall (TV One)**; Geoff Conway, 5 Days in the Red Zone (TV One); Gretchen Peterson, The Banker, The Escorts, and The $18 Million (TV3)	

=== Film ===
Best Feature Film†	Outstanding Feature Film Debut†
**Love Story**; My Wedding And Other Secrets; Predicament	**Josh McKenzie, The Hopes & Dreams of Gazza Snell**; Michael Bennett, Matariki; Simone Horrocks, After the Waterfall
Best Director in a Feature Film†	Best Lead Actor in a Feature Film†
**Florian Habicht, Love Story**; Roseanne Liang, My Wedding And Other Secrets; Jason Stutter, Predicament	**Rawiri Paratene, The Insatiable Moon**; Antony Starr, After the Waterfall; Matt Whelan, My Wedding And Other Secrets
Best Lead Actress in a Feature Film	Best Supporting Actor in a Feature Film
**Michelle Ang, My Wedding And Other Secrets**; Robyn Malcolm, The Hopes & Dreams of Gazza Snell; Sara Wiseman, The Insatiable Moon	**Greg Johnson, The Insatiable Moon**; Josh McKenzie, The Hopes & Dreams of Gazza Snell; Edwin Wright, Matariki
Best Supporting Actress in a Feature Film†	Best Screenplay for a Feature Film†
**Sara Wiseman, Matariki**; Alix Bushnell, Matariki – Filmwork Ltd; Teresa Woodham, The Insatiable Moon	**Roseanne Liang & Angeline Loo, My Wedding And Other Secrets**; Mike Riddell, The Insatiable Moon; Jason Stutter, Predicament
Best Cinematography in a Feature Film‡	Best Editing in a Feature Film‡
**Simon Raby, Predicament**; Alun Bollinger, Love Birds; Maria Ines Manchego, Love Story	**Peter O'Donoghue, Love Story**; Cushla Dillon, After the Waterfall; Jonathan Woodford-Robinson, Predicament
Best Original Music in a Feature Film‡	Best Sound in a Feature Film‡
**Plan 9, Predicament**; Neville Copland, The Insatiable Moon; Don McGlashan, Matariki	Sponsored by Images & Sound: **Dick Reade & Gethin Creagh, After the Waterfall**; Tim Prebble, Chris Todd, Mike Hedges & Gilbert Lake, The Hopes & Dreams of Gazza Snell; Matt Stutter, Martin Kwok, Michael Hedges, Gilbert Lake & Ken Saville, Predicament
Best Production Design in a Feature Film‡	Best Costume Design in a Feature Film‡
**John Harding, Predicament**; Miro Harre, Matariki; Andrew McAlpine, Love Birds	**Lesley Burkes-Harding, Predicament**; Bob Buck, Tracker; Kirsty Cameron, Love Birds
Best Make-Up Design in a Feature Film‡	Best Visual Effects in a Feature Film‡
**Angela Mooar, Predicament**; Denise Kum, Love Birds	**Sauce VFX, Predicament**; Digipost, Love Birds
Best Short Film‡	Best Performance in a Short Film‡
**Ebony Society**; BIRD; Go The Dogs	**Peter Hawes, BIRD**; Jennifer Ludlam, Hauraki; Brittany-Anne Romijn, Go The Dogs
Best Screenplay for a Short Film‡	Outstanding Technical Contribution to a Short Film‡
**Tammy Davis, Ebony Society**; Sam Holst, Meathead; Gregory King, Jane Shearer & Steve Ayson, BIRD	**Maria-Elena Doyle, Meniscus**; James Cunningham, Das Tub; James Cunningham, First Contact
