= Janet McIntyre =

New Zealand television journalist, reporter and producer

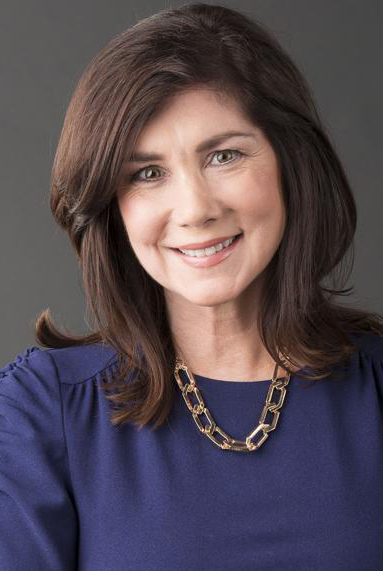
- Janet McIntyre in 2016
- Born: Brisbane, Australia
- Occupation: News presenter
- Years active: 1989–present
- Employer: TVNZ
- Known for: Australia; Channel 9 News; New Zealand; 60 Minutes; 20/20; Sunday
- Spouse: Keith Slater (2005–2017)
- Partner: Derek McKendry (until his death in 1999)
- Awards: See Awards and nominations

Janet McIntyre is a New Zealand television journalist, reporter and producer. She worked as a news reporter in Australia on Channel 9 News, along with 60 Minutes in New Zealand. She previously worked as a reporter for New Zealand current affairs show Sunday.

== Career ==
Janet previously worked in Australia, starting her career as a reporter for Australia's Channel 9. In 1989 she moved to NZ for the launch of TV3, where she worked with 60 Minutes as a reporter.

Janet has been nominated and won several awards for her work in New Zealand television.

== Personal life ==
Janet's partner Derek McKendry, who was a veteran cameraman, died suddenly in 1999 after an apparent heart attack. McKendry covered camera work on the Vietnam War.

Janet was married to New Zealand journalist Keith Slater from 2005 until his death in 2017.

== Awards and nominations ==
- 1995 Qantas Media Awards (Nominated)
- 1995 Qantas Media Awards – The Last Victim (Qantas Prize) (Won)
- 2005 Qantas Television Awards – TV Journalist of the Year (Won)
- 2005 Qantas Television Awards – Best Current Affairs Reporter (Nominated)
- 2010 Qantas Film and Television Awards – Best Current Affairs Reporting (Won)
- 2011 Aotearoa Film & Television Awards – Best Current Affairs Reporting (Nominated)
- 2012 New Zealand Television Awards – Best Current Affairs Reporting (Nominated)
