= Nic Sampson =

New Zealand actor, comedian, and writer

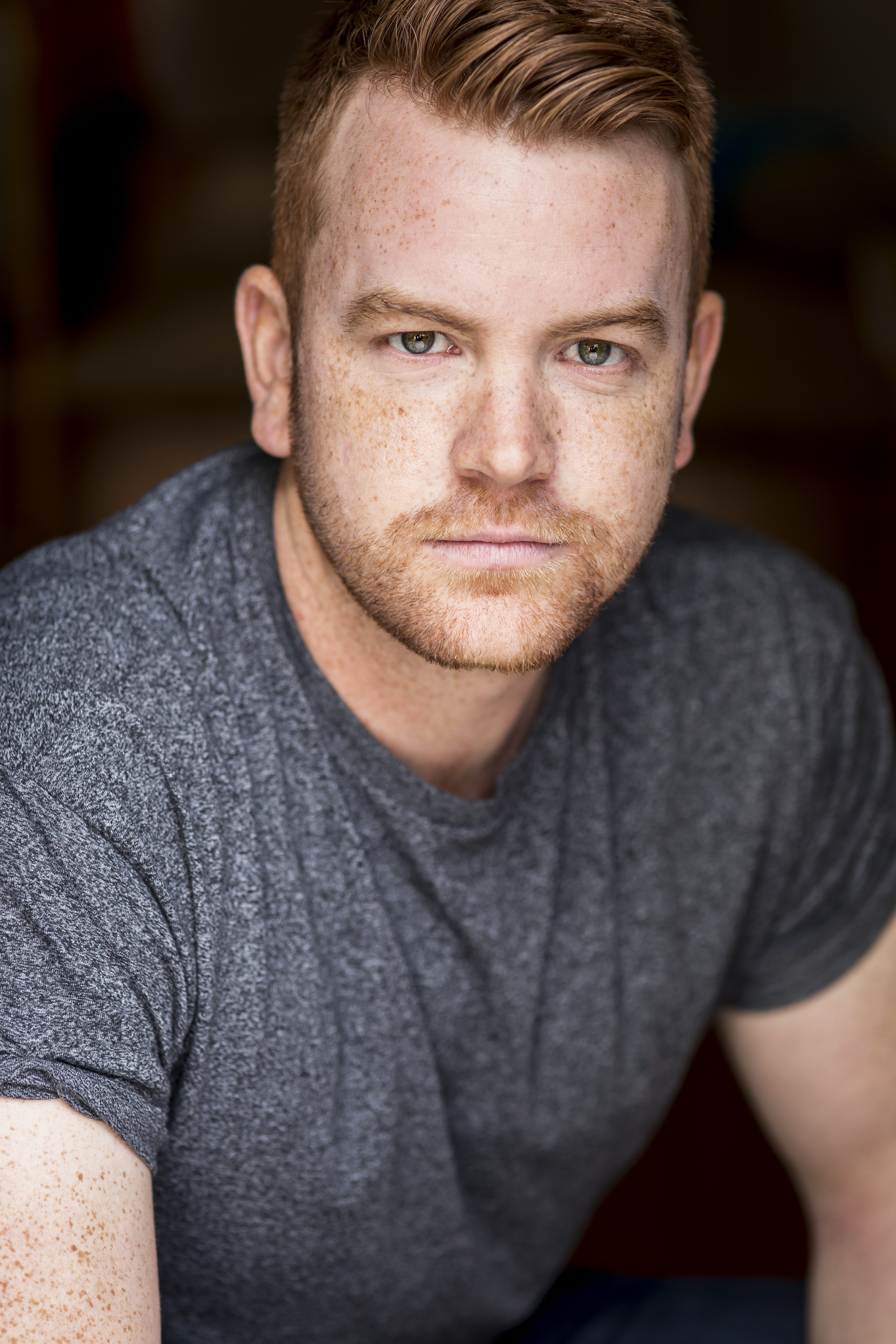
- Born: New Zealand
- Occupations: Actor; comedian; writer
- Years active: 1999–present
- Website: www.nicsampson.com

Nic Sampson is a New Zealand actor, comedian, and writer known for his roles as Chip Thorn, the Yellow Mystic Ranger on Power Rangers Mystic Force, Detective Constable Sam Breen on The Brokenwood Mysteries, and for the New Zealand sketch show Funny Girls.

== Life and career ==
Sampson portrayed Chip Thorn, the Yellow Mystic Ranger on Power Rangers Mystic Force which premiered in 2006. He was also the voice of the Sentinel Knight on Power Rangers Operation Overdrive, and various monsters in subsequent series.

Sampson portrayed Detective Constable Sam Breen (2014-2021) in The Brokenwood Mysteries, a New Zealand detective, drama television series that premiered on Prime in 2014.

In 2014, Sampson won Best Newcomer at the New Zealand International Comedy Festival. In 2015 he was nominated for the Billy T Award and in 2016 Sampson was nominated for the Fred Award for best New Zealand show.

Sampson was a writer and performer for NZ news satire show The Jono Project and Jono and Ben. Sampson was also a writer and performer for sketch comedy Funny Girls which ran for three seasons (2015–2018). He is one of the creators of NZ sitcom Golden Boy.

Sampson is a founding member of Auckland-based improvised comedy collective Snort.

In 2021, Sampson joined Rose Matafeo and Alice Snedden as co-writer for the second series of BBC Three and HBO Max's Starstruck.

In 2024, he voiced one of the characters for the film, Paddington in Peru, and wrote for the Channel 4 TV show, Taskmaster Junior.

== Filmography ==
=== Television ===
Year	Title	Role	Notes
1999	A Twist In The Tale	Jonathon	1 episode
2003	Freaky	Jeremy	1 episode
2006	Power Rangers Mystic Force	Charlie "Chip" Thorn/Yellow Mystic Ranger	32 episodes
2007	Power Rangers Operation Overdrive	Sentinel Knight (voice)	Recurring role
2008	Power Rangers Jungle Fury	Whiricane (voice)	1 episode
2009	The Cult	Doctor	1 episode
2010	Go Girls	Derek	Recurring role Season 2
2012	Jono and Ben	Various	Regular role
2013	Auckland Daze	Nic	2 episodes
2014	Step Dave	Hamish	5 episodes
2014	Flat3	Nic	4 episodes
2014	Power Rangers Super Megaforce	Skatana (voice)	1 episode
2015	Power Rangers Dino Charge	Slammer (voice)	1 episode
2015–2018	Funny Girls	Various	Regular role
2014–2021	The Brokenwood Mysteries	D.C. Sam Breen	24 episodes
2021–2023	Starstruck	Steve	Actor (8 episodes, seasons 1, 2 & 3) Writer (seasons 2 & 3)

=== Film ===
Year	Title	Role	Notes
2010	Spies and Lies	Constable Egan	TV movie
2010	The Warrior's Way	Pug	
2012	Emperor	Lieutenant Red	
2018	The Breaker Upperers	Jeff	
2020	Baby Done	Brian	
2024	Paddington in Peru	Elderly Resident Bear 4	Voice
