= Flat3 =

- Created by: JJ Fong; Perlina Lau; Ally Xue
- Written by: Roseanne Liang; Simon Ward
- Directed by: Roseanne Liang
- Country of origin: New Zealand
- No. of series: 3
- No. of episodes: 18

Original release
- Network: YouTube; Vimeo
- Release: 22 February 2013 – 24 October 2014

Flat3 is a New Zealand comedy web series written and directed by Roseanne Liang. It stars co-creators JJ Fong as Jessica, Perlina Lau as Perlina, and Ally Xue as Lee.

Flat3 premiered on YouTube and Vimeo on 22 February 2013. The show focuses around three Asian Kiwi girls living together in Auckland. Lee, Jessica, and Perlina are young flat-mates searching for romance, employment, and self-confidence in the creative and comedic world. The style is self-described as "sometimes smart, often silly, a little rude and a lot awkward".

== Production ==
JJ Fong, Perlina Lau and Ally Xue were inspired to create a comedy web series after experiencing a lack of roles as Asian actresses working in the New Zealand screen industry. Flat3 formed when Roseanne Liang of My Wedding and Other Secrets joined the team as writer and director. After missing out on funding from New Zealand On Air, the creators called upon friends to help shoot the first season. The show was screened at the Friars Comedy Club Festival 2013 in New York.

Season three received NZ$100,000 in funding from New Zealand on Air. It was also the show's final season, although there were suggestions of a possible television show.

== Cast ==
- Ally Xue as Lee
- J.J. Fong as Jessica
- Perlina Lau as Perlina

Recurring

- Katrina Wesseling as Katrina
- Simon Ward as Simon
- Matariki Whatarau as Aiden
- Mike Ginn as Jackie Chan
- Calum Gittins as Calum
- Rose Matafeo as Rose [episode 2]
- Kerry Warkia as Kerry/Maitre'd [episode 2]
- Paul Gittins as Paul [episode 5]
- Kiel McNaughton as Hitchhiker [episode 6]
- Yoson An as Yoson
- Taofia Pelesasa as Fia
- Olivia Tennet as Lee [episode 5]
- Kimberley Crossman
- Chelsea McEwan Miller

Guest appearances

- Nic Sampson as Nic [episode 3]
- Dan Cowley as Dan/Career Consultant [episode 1]
- Hweiling Ow as Hweiling [episode 2]
- Keira Christina as Keira [episode 2]
- Jordan Selwyn as Leon [episode 6
- Susanna Tang as Xana [episode 6]
- Madeleine Sami as Madeline
- Kerry Warkia as Kerry
- Shannon Ryan as Shannon Ryan [episode 2]

== Episodes ==
=== Season 1 (2013) ===
Season one features six 7-minute episodes. The plot follows Lee, Jessica, and Perlina as they try to "figure out who they are, what they’re doing in this life, and whose turn it is to buy toilet paper."

No. overall	No. in series	Title	Directed by	Written by	Original release date
1	1	"Lee"	Roseanne Liang	Roseanne Liang	22 February 2013
2	2	"Jessica"	Roseanne Liang	Roseanne Liang	22 February 2013
3	3	"Perlina"	Roseanne Liang	Roseanne Liang	8 March 2013
4	4	"Flat Warming"	Roseanne Liang	Roseanne Liang	15 March 2013
5	5	"The Speed Date"	Roseanne Liang	Roseanne Liang	22 March 2013
6	6	"The Home Intruder"	Roseanne Liang	Roseanne Liang	28 March 2013

=== Season 2 (2013) ===
Season 2 continues to follow Lee, Jessica and Perlina.

No. overall	No. in series	Title	Directed by	Written by	Original release date
7	1	"The Blind Date"	Roseanne Liang	Roseanne Liang	26 October 2013
8	2	"The Promo Girl"	Roseanne Liang	Roseanne Liang	26 October 2013
9	3	"In The Bedroom"	Roseanne Liang	Roseanne Liang	1 November 2013
10	4	"Wasted"	Roseanne Liang	Roseanne Liang	8 November 2013
11	5	"Team Building"	Roseanne Liang	Roseanne Liang	15 November 2013
12	6	"On The Road"	Roseanne Liang	Roseanne Liang	22 November 2013

=== Season 3 (2014) ===
Season 3 continues to follow Lee, Jessica and Perlina in their final season, 2014.

No. overall	No. in series	Title	Directed by	Written by	Original release date
13	1	"Carpe Diem"	Roseanne Liang	Roseanne Liang	26 September 2014
14	2	"Teacher"	Roseanne Liang	Roseanne Liang	26 September 2014
15	3	"Man Talk, Baby"	Roseanne Liang	Roseanne Liang & Simon Ward	3 October 2014
16	4	"Sale Now On"	Roseanne Liang	Roseanne Liang & Simon Ward	10 October 2014
17	5	"The White Album"	Roseanne Liang	Roseanne Liang	17 October 2014
18	6	"The Game"	Roseanne Liang	Roseanne Liang	24 October 2014
