= Ingrid Park =

New Zealand actress (born 1971)

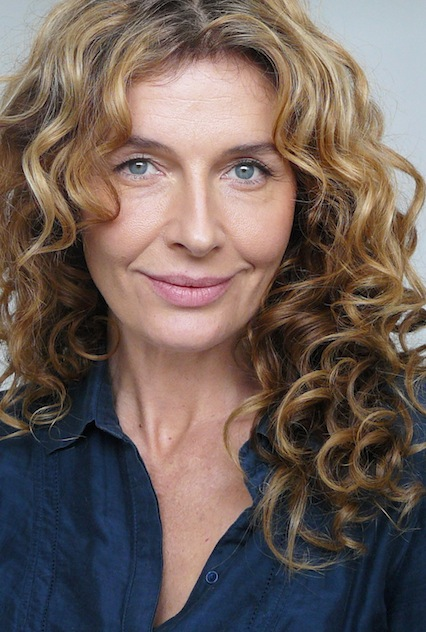
- Park in 2013
- Born: February 1971 (age 54–55); Auckland, New Zealand
- Occupation: Actress
- Years active: 1998-present
- Known for: Dr. MacKenzie Choat in Shortland Street (1998-1999)
- Height: 171 cm (5 ft 7 in)

Ingrid Park (born February 1971) is a New Zealand television actress. She began her acting career in 1998 appearing in the New Zealand television soap opera series Shortland Street.

== Early life and career breakthrough ==
Park was born in 1971 in Pahiatua and was raised in Palmerston North. She studied engineering before making her breakthrough television series debut as Dr. Mackenzie Choatin the 1998-1999 run of Shortland Street. She went on to appear in notable television films including Big Fire, Raising Waylon, Spies and Lies. Avalon High and Bloodlines. She extended her television acting career through the 2008 series Go Girls which became one of the most successful TV series in New Zealand — she appeared in all five season of the series in the supporting role of Britta's mother.

== Filmography ==
=== Film ===
Year	Title	Role	Notes
2005	Luella Miller	Gale	
2010	Eeling	Woman	Short
2012	Emperor	Woman Hall Proctor	

=== Television ===
Year	Title	Role	Notes
1998–99	Shortland Street	Dr. Mackenzie Choat	Regular role
2000	Jack of All Trades	Camille	Episodes: "Love Potion #10", "It's a Mad, Mad, Mad Opera", "Croquey in the Pokey"
2001–02	Street Legal	Maddy McGuire	Regular role (seasons 2–3)
2002	Superfire	Janelle	TV film
2002	Blood Crime	Hostage Woman	TV film
2004	Raising Waylon	Kim	TV film
2006	Orange Roughies	Helen Moore	Episodes: "1.2", "1.3"
2008	Burying Brian	Denise Crowley	Main role
2009–2013	Go Girls	Fran McMann	Recurring role
2010	True Crime: Bloodlines	Cheryl Stepford	TV series
2010	Avalon High	Mrs. Pennington	TV film
2010	Spies and Lies	Mrs. Steven	TV film
2013–14	Agent Anna	Erica Ball	Episodes: "Agent Anna", "2.10"
2015, 2017, 2018, 2024	The Brokenwood Mysteries	Jools Fahey	Episodes: "Catch of the Day", "As If Nothing Had Happened", "Tontine", "Love You to Death"
2016	Ash vs Evil Dead	Cindy	Episode: "Home"
2018	James Patterson's Murder Is Forever	Sue Fisher	Episode: "Home Sweet Murder"
2018	In A Flash...	Beverley Smith	TV film
2018	Westside	Judge	Episode: "4.1"
