= Alix Bushnell =

New Zealand actress

- Born: 1983 (age 42–43); New Zealand
- Occupations: Actress, Drama teacher
- Years active: 1994; 2009 – present
- Website: Alix Bushnell on Twitter

Alix Bushnell is a New Zealand actress, best known for her role as "Britta McMann" on the television series, Go Girls.

== Early life ==
Her first celebrity crush was Leonardo DiCaprio when she was fourteen, and her favourite school subjects were English and Music. She has an interest in 16th century costume and culture.

Bushnell enjoys walking her dog, going to the gym, hanging out with friends and reading. Bushnell has one son.

== Career ==
Despite a role in the 1994 film, Bread and Roses, Bushnell's early focus was on her musical career; her musical abilities had been recognized by her mother at the age of eight, and Bushnell studied piano and classical singing until her early twenties, when she began to feel stifled by the rigid structure of classical music, and consequently turned her creative focus to acting.

Bushnell auditioned and gained a place at the prestigious New Zealand Drama School: Toi Whakaari. She won the role of Britta McMann, five months before graduating.

== Filmography ==
Film and Television
Year	Title	Role	Notes
1994	Bread and Roses	Beverley	
2000-2001	The Lord of the Rings (film series)	Rohan Refugee	
2009–2012	Go Girls	Britta McMann	52+ episodes
2010	Matariki	Lisa	
2010	This Is Not My Life	Stewardess	Episode: "1.9"
2012	White Lies		

== Awards ==
Go Girls won best NZ drama at the 2012 New Zealand Television Awards.

Alix Bushnell nominated for Aotearoa Film & Television Awards-Finalist Best Supporting Actress in a Feature Film 2011

Best on the Box Award 2010
