= You Me Now =

- You Me Now logo used on the You Me Now Facebook page.
- Genre: Soap opera
- Running time: 7–9 minutes
- Country of origin: New Zealand
- Language: English
- Home station: Radio New Zealand
- Created by: All The Way Home Productions
- Written by: Esther-Rose Green, Paul Gordon Harrop, Sara Allen, Asher Smith, Simon Leary
- Produced by: Adam Macaulay
- Edited by: Phil Benge
- Recording studio: Radio New Zealand Wellington
- Original release: September 2010 – December 2012
- No. of episodes: 170 (as of 24 December 2012)
- Audio format: Stereophonic sound
- Opening theme: "You Me Now" - Written and Performed by Kane Parsons
- Website: You Me Now homepage

You Me ... Now is New Zealand's first radio soap opera, written and created by All The Way Home Productions. Season one was 25 episodes long and originally aired on Radio New Zealand in 2010. After a successful run, You Me Now was picked up for another 150 episodes available for podcast on the Radio New Zealand website, with new episodes uploaded every Monday, Wednesday and Friday.

== Development ==
Discussion that led to the creation of the series began in 2009. Every year Radio New Zealand's Drama department offers a three-week internship to four graduates of the acting course of Toi Whakaari: NZ Drama School. In 2009 executive producer Adam Macaulay suggested that the interns pitch a daily 5 minute soap opera style drama. Eventually You Me Now was pitched as a modern-day love story set in Wellington. The pitch was accepted and 25 episodes were commissioned to be written and recorded.

== Characters ==
You Me ... Now has a core cast of characters as well as recurring minor roles.

- Alice McKinnely (Esther-Rose Green)
- Johno Anderson (Asher Smith)
- Jarrod Parkin (Cohen Holloway) (Hadleigh Walker EP 51 Onward)
- Lucille Menzies (Sara Allen)
- Terry Prichard (Paul Gordon Harrop)
- Gavin Beesley (Barnaby Fredric)
- Celeste McKinnely (Sarah Boddy)
- Magnus Mouat (Tim Gordon)
- Dave McKinnely (Jed Brophy)
- Katherine Paterson (Amy Tarleton)
- Joel Parkin (Simon K Leary)
- Wiremu Johnson (James Tito)
- Max Cooper (James Kupa)
- Anya Cooper (Tess Jamieson)
- Sam Cooper (Peter McKenzie)
- Katazyna (Ivana Palezevich)
- Jake the Fisherman (Duncan Smith)
- Rhys Kirkson (Martyn Wood) (Aaron Alexander EP 73–85)
- Effie (Alix Bushnell)
- Daria (Phoebe Hurst)
- Chris Baker (Aaron Alexander)

== Plot ==
=== Season one (Episodes 1–25) ===
Season one begins with the episode "Crash" in which the lead character Alice McKinnely crashes her car into a tree while talking to her mother (Celeste) on the phone. Johno Anderson happens to be biking past at this time and waits by her side after calling emergency services. The two have an immediate connection but are swept away from each other when the ambulance arrives. In hospital, Alice is encouraged by her best friend (Lucille) to begin a series of vlogs which she titles "Accidentally Alice". Meanwhile, Johno's technology savvy friend (Terry) finds Alice's Vlog online along with a message to her 'saviour' to meet her at the market where her mother works. Johno happens to work there as well so meeting her is not a problem. The rest of the season follows the rocky on again off again relationship between Johno and Alice. Along the way, Johno is tempted by an older woman, Alice's estranged father (Dave) turns up sick, Jarrod and Lucille hook up, The Boy's band plays some gigs and there is a house fire. The season ends with Johno deciding to go overseas to find himself and Alice unsure whether or not to join him.

=== Season two (Episodes 26–50) ===
Season two begins with the funeral of Alice's father (Dave McKinnely) which Alice has had to return early from her overseas trip for. Johno remains overseas in the meantime. After the destruction of the boys' flat in Season One, Jarrod and Lucille have moved in together and are now in a relationship, Terry has moved into Alice's old room while she was overseas and now Alice is forced to sleep on the couch. This turns around fairly quickly though when she finds that she has been left her father's houseboat. Terry and Alice move in. Meanwhile, Jarrod's brother (Joel) has come to town, Jarrod wants nothing to do with him for reasons that are unclear to everyone else. Alice offers Joel a place to stay on the Houseboat which he gratefully accepts. Johno returns home to find Alice on top of Joel play-fighting, once again they fly into another of their: "It's not what it looks like" fights resulting in Alice asking Johno to move in with them. Terry has not been enjoying the houseboat due to its bad internet connection, he has been having skype dates with a Russian girl (Katazyna) that he met on "Dating Roulette". When Terry is offered money by Marbel Enterprises for some internet applications he patented, Terry decides to use the money to fly Katazyna over from Russia. Lucille discovers she is pregnant after vomiting at a "welcome home" breakfast for Johno. Alice is offered a job at Puka Puka publishing by Wiremu Johnson, her new boss. Alice tells everyone the good news (after drinking with Joel all day) at the naming ceremony for her houseboat. Lucille finally manages to get Alice and Gavin alone and tells them she is pregnant, she doesn't know how to tell Jarrod.

== Writing ==
Season One was written by the 2008 graduates of the acting course Toi Whakaari Esther-Rose Green, Paul Gordon Harrop, Sara Allen and Asher Smith as contracted by All The Way Home Productions with Adam Macaulay (RNZ Drama Dept Exec Prod) as script supervisor. Season One was awarded the Best New Drama Award in the 2011 New Zealand Radio Awards.

Season Two added 2010 graduate of the acting course Toi Whakaari Simon Leary to the writing team. With a writing team of five, each member wrote five episodes a (25 episode) season and after notes from Adam Macaulay, edited each other's episodes to get a consistent tone for the season.

== Music ==
The music in the series is composed and performed by Kane Parsons. The title song "You Me Now" begins and ends every episode in the series. In the world of the show "You Me Now" the song is performed by Johno and his band "Dagobah Sound System" with Johno as lead singer and rhythm guitar, Jarrod as lead guitarist and Terry on drums. Though Kane Parsons actually performs all these roles behind the scenes. Season 2 has a more melodic version of the "You Me Now" track which opens and closes the episodes compared to the rougher, rockier Season One version.
