= List of Go Girls episodes =

The following is a list of episodes from the New Zealand comedy Go Girls.

It premiered on February 18, 2009 and ended on July 16, 2013, with a total of 65 episodes over the course of 3 series.

== Series overview ==
Series	Episodes	Originally released	
Series	Episodes	First released	Last released
1	13	18 February 2009	14 May 2009
2	13	18 March 2010	17 June 2010
3	13	8 February 2011	3 May 2011
4	13	14 February 2012	8 May 2012
5	13	30 April 2013	16 July 2013

== Episodes ==
=== Series 1 (2009) ===
Four friends on Auckland's North Shore decide to turn their lives around by setting new year's resolutions they will each achieve in one year. Amy will be rich, and buy back her house. Britta will be famous. Cody will be married and Kevin....will get a new sports steering wheel. But as with any dream the Go Girls find that things don't always go the way you plan...

No. overall	No. in series	Title	Directed by	Written by	Original release date
1	1	"Dream On (January)"	Angela Bloomfield	Gavin Strawhan & Rachel Lang	19 February 2009
Amy, Britta and Cody are three young women suffering their quarter century crisis: 25 and what have they achieved? They make a vow that in one year they’ll each fulfil their ambition. Their mate-since-childhood Kevin, admires their pluck but, to be honest, since Amy, Britta and Cody are currently Tragically Poor; Tragically Unknown; and Tragically Single, he reckons it’s going to be a bit of an ask.
2	2	"Signs and Obstacles (February)"	Angela Bloomfield	Gavin Strawhan	26 February 2009
Amy gets a foot in the business door but Kevin smells a rat; and sparks fly when Britta meets up with a former flame.
3	3	"First Catch Monkey (March)"	Katie Wolfe	Kate McDermott	5 March 2009
Everyone pitches in to solve Cody’s man problems; and Britta gets a lucky break.
4	4	"Mothers & Daughters (April)"	Katie Wolfe	Gavin Strawhan	12 March 2009
Britta’s good nature gets the better of her; Amy’s loyalty is put to the test; and Cody finds love in all the wrong places
5	5	"Loyal (May)"	Katie Wolfe	Gavin Strawhan	19 March 2009
Amy feels betrayed and Kevin’s heart gets the better of him. Gwen drops a bomb.
6	6	"Less Than Zero (June)"	Katie Wolfe	Gavin Strawhan	26 March 2009
Britta is struck by tragedy; Amy gets the wrong idea; and there’s a new McMann in town
7	7	"I Should Be So Lucky (July)"	Angela Bloomfield	Rachel Lang	2 April 2009
A launch party creates havoc for Cody, Amy and Britta while Kevin seizes the day.
8	8	"Great Expectations (August)"	Angela Bloomfield	Kate McDermott	9 April 2009
Britta gets to know a long lost relative, but at what cost?; and Amy struggles with Cody’s new life.
9	9	"Faking It (September)"	Britta Johnstone	Gavin Strawhan	16 April 2009
Kevin’s dreams come true; Amy has the hangover from hell; and Cody finds true love.
10	10	"Changes (October)"	Britta Johnstone	Kate McDermott	23 April 2009
Britta suffers a devastating loss, but is there an upside?; Amy’s in denial; and Kevin has serious girl problems.
11	11	"Do The Right Thing (November)"	Britta Johnstone	Kate McDermott	30 April 2009
Cody makes a big decision; Amy gets a new partner; and Britta considers a different kind of fame…
12	12	"Sex, Lies and Home Renovations (December)"	Peter Salmon	Gavin Strawhan	7 May 2009
Britta digs for dirt on Eli; Amy and Brad exchange mixed messages; and Cody makes an alarming discovery.
13	13	"Dream Believers (January)"	Peter Salmon	Rachel Lang	14 May 2009
One year on, Amy, Britta, Cody and Kevin return to the beach where they first made their pact; Cody’s big day brings heartbreak and surprise; and it seems everyone believes in fairies.

=== Series 2 (2010) ===
On 29 April 2009 TVNZ and NZ On Air confirmed that the show had been commissioned for a second Series due to strong ratings and its dominance of its Thursday 8:30 pm time-slot. Series 2 of Go Girls sees the girls and Kevin trying to achieve brand new years resolutions. Amy will help one person a month. Britta will find true love. Cody will make her marriage to Eli work while Kevin will "aim higher" (Whatever that means!).

No. overall	No. in series	Title	Directed by	Written by	Original release date
14	1	"Starting Over (January)"	Josh Frizzell	Kate McDermott	18 March 2010
A new year, new resolutions; the Go Girls embark on another epic quest. And this time, they decide on new and bigger objectives…
15	2	"Nothing But The Truth (February)"	Josh Frizzell	Rachel Lang	25 March 2010
Honesty is the best policy. Isn’t it? For Amy and Cody, it seems some truths might be best kept secret…
16	3	"We Are Family (March)"	Jonathan Alver	Kate McDermott & Gavin Strawhan	1 April 2010
Loyalties are tested, and who comes first – friends or family? The return of Amy’s old school friend stirs up a catfight; while Britta finds a love guru. First appearance of Olivia Duff
17	4	"Crazy Enough To Work (April)"	Jonathan Alver	Gavin Strawhan	8 April 2010
Anyone can do anything – unless they’re two of life’s great under-achievers; Kevin takes the plunge and Britta surprises everyone.
18	5	"Best Days of Your Life (May)"	Jonathan Alver	Rachel Lang	15 April 2010
The 10-year school reunion gives the Go Girls a chance to face their demons and close old wounds. (Or open a few new ones)
19	6	"What Becomes of the Broken Hearted? (June)"	Jonathan Alver	Gavin Strawhan & Kate McDermott	22 April 2010
Kevin gets a nightmare flatmate and a dangerous love interest, as Britta finds herself in the middle of a tug of love.
20	7	"No Going Back (July)"	Britta Johnstone	Kate McDermott	29 April 2010
Cody’s happily married and certain she’s going to stay that way. But will the return of her first love Ben change everything?
21	8	"How Low Can You Go? (August)"	Britta Johnstone	Gavin Strawhan	6 May 2010
Kevin finds the downside of being the other man, while Britta’s list is an inspiration to one ideal man.
22	9	"Boys Behaving Badly (September)"	Peter Burger	Kate McDermott	13 May 2010
Bad-ass boys are out on the prowl – Kevin and um, Brad. But the quest to score meets serious opposition and big competition.
23	10	"Spring Rolls (October)"	Peter Burger	Gavin Strawhan	20 May 2010
Britta thinks she’s met Mr Right, but Brad is sure he’s Mr Wrong. Olivia’s job is on the line, as is Kevin’s favourite takeaway joint.
24	11	"It Ain't Over Till It's Over (November)"	Peter Salmon	Gavin Strawhan	3 June 2010
Cody is in turmoil when a Bad Fairy is back in town – but Eli’s ex Phillipe claims he just wants to be friends. And Kevin realises what aiming higher really means.
25	12	"Together Alone (December)"	Peter Salmon	Kate McDermott	10 June 2010
Christmas – a time of joy and togetherness – as Cody faces fallout, Kevin plays with fire and Britta sees flaws in her true love.
26	13	"The More Things Change... (January)"	Peter Salmon	Gavin Strawhan & Rachel Lang	17 June 2010
Kevin's witchy liaison puts him on the outer – as Britta thinks she's cursed, and Brad goes into battle to defeat a Horseman

=== Series 3 (2011) ===
After consistently dominating its timeslot Go Girls was renewed for a third Series on 6 May 2010. Series 3 sees the characters nearing the end of their 20s and setting new goals for the year. Kevin decides he wants to be a dad. Cody decides to take care of her family. Britta wants a new career. Brad wants to travel the world, with Britta at his side while Olivia just wants to live....

No. overall	No. in series	Title	Directed by	Written by	Original release date
27	1	"Situation Not Normal (January)"	Peter Burger	Gavin Strawhan	8 February 2011
This year, the quests are sorted. But has Kevin really found the perfect woman? And can Cody defend Gwen against a witch?
28	2	"It's Not About You (February)"	Peter Burger	Gavin Strawhan	15 February 2011
The honeymoon may be over for Brad and Britta, as Kevin is haunted by a ghost from his past.
29	3	"Playing Grownups (March)"	Angela Bloomfield	Gavin Strawhan	22 February 2011
Cody deals with sex and sex bombs, and Olivia finds her own life is a battleground.
30	4	"Be My Baby (April)"	Angela Bloomfield	Kate McDermott	1 March 2011
When Brad gets surprising news, Britta confronts the green eyed monster. And Kevin gets an offer that could ace his quest.
31	5	"Family Matters (May)"	John Laing	Gavin Strawhan	8 March 2011
Kevin has family! But this particular cat causes havoc among the pigeons, and Cody needs cash for a good cause.
32	6	"He's Gonna Be Thirty (June)"	John Laing	Kate McDermott	15 March 2011
Kevin is facing the big 3-0, but Olivia raises bigger problems. And will Britta and Cody ever get rid of the cuckoo in the nest?
33	7	"A Life Changing Experience (July)"	John Laing	Kate McDermott	22 March 2011
Brad is about to be a Dad and Britta’s new object of desire leads to desperate measures, and Leo.
34	8	"Where We Are Now (August)"	Peter Burger	Gavin Strawhan	29 March 2011
Cody and Britta test their mettle when Gwen has a child go missing, and Brad has a child that is all too present.
35	9	"30 Days Hath September (September)"	Peter Burger	Rachel Lang	5 April 2011
When it comes to love, a lot can change in a month – as Kevin, Cody, Olivia, Brad and Britta all discover...
36	10	"Conflict Resolution (October)"	John Laing	Gavin Strawhan	12 April 2011
Amy is back and determined to help, as Britta takes on an enemy of gargantuan proportions.
37	11	"Choice (November)"	John Laing	Kate McDermott & Gavin Strawhan	19 April 2011
Does Kevin have a rival, or just a case of cold feet? And Cody’s quest hits a very big hitch.
38	12	"The Beginning of the End (December)"	??	Rachel Lang	26 April 2011
Kevin takes charge! But there are only so many things a man can control, especially when it comes to love...
39	13	"The Brave and the Really Stupid (January)"	Josh Frizzell	Gavin Strawhan & Rachel Lang	3 May 2011
Kevin’s wedding approaches, but his big admission has far-reaching consequences...

=== Series 4 (2012) ===
While Series 3 was still airing TV2 announced the show would return for a fourth series after the third series was another ratings winner. The story skips ahead one year and this time it's about priorities, the price of success and deciding when is it time to settle down?

No. overall	No. in series	Title	Directed by	Written by	Original release date
40	1	"Consequences (January)"	Michael Duignan	Gavin Strawhan	14 February 2012
Kevin is back in town with bombshell news, as Britta has big news for Kevin. But when bombs go off, someone is bound to get hurt...
41	2	"Two Trolls (February)"	Michael Duignan	Rachel Lang	21 February 2012
Amy battles with a nemesis from her past; as Cody and Olivia find love and war closer to home.
42	3	"Love Hurts (March)"	Michael Duignan	Rachel Lang	28 February 2012
Kevin needs a lot of looking after – but how far should a caregiver go? As Olivia gets judgement from beyond the grave...
43	4	"A Better Man (April)"	Murray Keane	Rachel Lang & Gavin Strawhan	6 March 2012
Kevin faces up to a failure and gets help from unlikely quarters, as Leo tries to be a better man for his love
44	5	"Kevin And Amy Up A Tree (May)"	John Laing	Gavin Strawhan	13 March 2012
Kevin has his heart’s desire, but Cody is about to lose everything...
45	6	"Bad Mothers (June)"	John Laing	Rachel Lang	20 March 2012
Brad gets an offer he wants to refuse, but when the McManns are on a crime spree and Britta is in crisis can he stay uninvolved? Note: This is the first episode that Brad narrates instead of Kevin.
46	7	"What A Difference A Frock Makes (July)"	John Laing	Kate McDermott	27 March 2012
Life can go in very different directions as Cody and Amy both discover, when visitors rock their world. But can a frock sale really make that much difference?
47	8	"Pleasure And Pain (August)"	Britta Johnstone	Kate McDermott	3 April 2012
Britta fears for Leo’s big break, when his boss is the Ex From Hell. As Olivia gets serious when the past returns to haunt her.
48	9	"Don't Look Back (September)"	Britta Johnstone	Gavin Strawhan	10 April 2012
Olivia, Britta and Cody are single gals, looking to move on. But when it comes to an ex – should you ever go back?
49	10	"Give and Take (October)"	John Laing	Rachel Lang	17 April 2012
Olivia wants to do good, but is a bad boy about to take advantage? As a childcare crisis leads Britta to an unlikely guru.
50	11	"Trouble (November)"	John Laing	Kate McDermott & Gavin Strawhan	24 April 2012
Amy faces the ultimate showdown with Rupert the Perve. But will she have to sacrifice her career?
51	12	"Home is Where the Heart is (December)"	Peter Salmon	Gavin Strawhan	1 May 2012
When Gwen goes missing, Cody reaches crunch point. And Britta battles the green eyed monster – with unexpected results.
52	13	"Happily Ever After (January)"	Pater Salmon	Rachel Lang	8 May 2012
Brad has to stop a wedding, but it’s going to take way more than a bouncy castle. As Britta gets an unwelcome surprise, and Olivia faces heartbreak. Note: Final episode to feature the original cast before the cast change in Series 5.

=== Series 5 (2013) ===
Now that Amy, Britta, Brad, Cody, Olivia and Kevin have successfully navigated their way through the minefield of their 20s, series five will introduce new friends who decide to try and take some control over their lives in an otherwise rather random universe.

No. overall	No. in series	Title	Directed by	Written by	Original release date
53	1	"The Witch Is Back (January)"	Britta Hawkins	Rachel Lang	30 April 2013
Ted wants to protect his friends from the witch that is Candy McMann. But an angel also needs his protection…
54	2	"Total Control (February)"	Britta Hawkins	Kate McDermott	7 May 2013
Levi has big schemes for parties, awards and a new love interest for Ted. As Candy and Bennie both run into the hottest man on the Shore…
55	3	"Expect the Unexpected (March)"	Britta Hawkins	Gavin Strawhan	14 May 2013
Ted gets help from the most unlikely suspect; as Bennie investigates crimes of the heart.
56	4	"Pushing Buttons (April)"	Katherine McRae	Sam Shore, Gavin Strawhan and Rachel Lang	21 May 2013
Levi finds a sure fire way to crush Tiana into midget pulp; as Alice’s naughty weekend leads to big trouble.
57	5	"Fate, Karma, Whatever... (May)"	Katherine McRae	Angeline Loo and Rachel Lang	28 May 2013
Ted’s determined to win Sarah, as he and Bennie get an unexpected windfall. And Candy’s punishment could be a romantic opportunity…
58	6	"Feel the Fear (June)"	John Laing	Rachel Lang	4 June 2013
Ted fears for Bennie; as Levi faces his ultimate fear. And Alice is having scary dreams – the ones about the Ex…
59	7	"Hide the Poo (July)"	John Laing	Gavin Strawhan	11 June 2013
Alice claims to have been super-bad – but is it true? And will she go further? As Candy’s heroic deed leads to a tough choice over Dr Hot.
60	8	"Not High School Anymore (August)"	Murray Keane	Kate McDermott	18 June 2013
The death of Levi’s high school nemesis brings many blasts from the past. But who is hiding secrets from back then?
61	9	"A Man of Action (September)"	Murray Keane	Kate McDermott	25 June 2013
Ted’s hopes are up when he finds Gordon is having an affair. And estranged from her friends, Candy returns to the dark side. The bitch is back!
62	10	"Relativity (October)"	Katherine McRae	Sam Shore and Gavin Strawhan	2 July 2013
Alice finds her wild life might wreck her career, as Ted finds he has an enemy close to home.
63	11	"The Problem with Maths (November)"	Katherine McRae	Rachel Lang	9 July 2013
Ted finds things aren’t adding up over who has slept with who. Candy adds up a lot of things – and draws some disturbing conclusions…
64	12	"Different, Strange (December)"	Katherine McRae	Rachel Lang	16 July 2013
Ted finally gets his wish; as Alice gets the speed wobbles – and Levi makes the ultimate sacrifice. And Candy really wants to do some bitch slapping…
65	13	"Curses (January)"	Katherine McRae	Rachel Lang	16 July 2013
Ted feels cursed, as Levi confronts his demons. And Candy is determined that Alice will have a wedding, no matter what…
