= Derek McKendry =

New Zealand TV television cameraman (1941–1999)

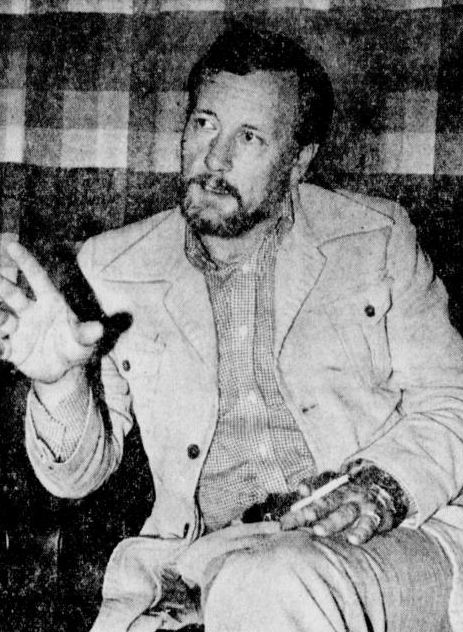
- McKendry in 1979
- Born: 1941
- Died: 1999 (aged 57–58); Auckland, New Zealand
- Occupations: Cameraman and photojournalist
- Years active: 1970-1999
- Partner: Janet McIntyre (1999)

Derek McKendry (1941–1999) was a New Zealand TV veteran television cameraman. He is known for spending 8 years covering coverage on the Vietnam War. In 1979 he was almost killed in Zambia after being accused of being a spy. In 1999 McKendry was in a relationship with New Zealand journalist Janet McIntyre.
