= Matariki (film) =

- New Zealand theatrical release poster
- Directed by: Michael Bennett
- Screenplay by: Michael Bennett; Gavin Strawhan
- Story by: Iaheto Ah Hi
- Produced by: Fiona Copland
- Starring: Sara Wiseman; Alix Bushnell; Susana Tang; Jason Wu
- Cinematography: Alun Bollinger
- Edited by: John Gilbert
- Music by: Don McGlashan
- Production company: Filmwork
- Distributed by: Arkles Entertainment
- Release dates: 11 September 2010 (TIFF World Premiere); 18 November 2010 (New Zealand)
- Running time: 92 minutes
- Country: New Zealand
- Language: English

Matariki is a 2010 New Zealand drama film set in Ōtara, South Auckland. The film is told through five interweaving stories all set in the days leading to the rising of Matariki. The film incorporates a variety of languages including English, Māori, Tokelauan, Samoan, and Cantonese. It features an ensemble cast and is the feature debut for actors Susana Tang and Jason Wu. The film was funded by the New Zealand Film Commission.

== Plot ==
It is New Year's Eve and Gunge (Edwin Wright) finds that his debt to a ruthless drug dealer sets off a chain of events that rip through his South Auckland neighbourhood. After bravely intervening in a beating, star rugby player Tama (Mark Ruka) finds his own life in jeopardy. His wife, Megan (Sara Wiseman), comes into conflict with Tama's Māori family over decisions concerning his care. Tama's brother Rick (Jarod Rawiri) is so rocked by the tragedy that he is forced to confront his own secrets and his allegiance to Maori values.

Meanwhile, teenaged Aleki (Jason Wu) struggles to find his identity in a new home. Transplanted from a small island in the South Pacific to the vibrant, multicultural community of South Auckland, Aleki feels caught between his father's traditional values and the temptations of his new culture. Nearby, Lisa (Alix Bushnell), who is nine months pregnant and devoted to her drug addicted boyfriend (Michael Whalley), begins to suspect that he may not make the best father for her baby.

== Cast ==
(Alphabetical)

- Alix Bushnell as Lisa
- Ben Baker as Aleki's Dad
- Camille Keenan as ICU Nurse
- Cherie James as Aunty Rachel's Daughter
- Dylan Tavita as Kid
- Edwin Wright as Gunge
- Iaheto Ah Hi as Tyrone
- Jarod Rawiri as Rick
- Jason Wu as Aleki
- Joseph Naufahu as Young Cop
- Mabel Wharekawa as Aunty Rachel
- Mark Ruka as Tama
- Michael Whalley as Jermaine
- Pua Magasiva as Sergeant Wolfgramm
- Rachel Nash as Midwife
- Sara Wiseman as Megan
- Serena Cotton as Social Worker
- Susana Tang as Spit
- Vela Manusaute as Russ

The film also features appearances by Bella Kalolo (singing 'What Love Can Do'), Hori Ahipene, and the director of the film Michael Bennett.

== Production ==
Ideas for the script began in the mid-1990s after director Michael Bennett saw a one-man stage play by Iaheto Ah Hi about his Tokelauan cousin named Aleki (Ah Hi subsequently went on to play lead character Tyrone in the film). Filming began in April 2009 with it almost entirely shot in Ōtara, South Auckland. Many locals were used as extras in the film (including location manager Damion Nathan), especially during scenes set in the Ōtara markets. Post production was partially done in Peter Jackson's Park Road Post studios.

The film's score was composed by Don McGlashan. McGlashan compiled a range of hits by renowned New Zealand artists including Gin Wigmore, Bill Sevesi, The Phoenix Foundation, Misfits of Science, Prince Tui Teka, Concord Dawn and The Brunettes. McGlashan also composed the film's main song "What Love Can Do", which was sung by soul/jazz singer Bella Kalolo and The GLCC Youth Choir. Numerous orchestral pieces were composed by McGlashan and played by the NZSO. Also in the film's soundtrack is a cover by The Stonefeather Blues Experience of John Hiatt's hit song "Feels Like Rain".

The film's crew included cinematographer Alun Bollinger and Academy Award-nominated editor John Gilbert.

== Music ==
Matariki (Original Motion Picture Soundtrack)

Soundtrack album by Don McGlashan
- Released: 15 November 2010
- Genre: Soundtrack
- Label: EMI Music New Zealand ltd

Matariki (Original Motion Picture Soundtrack) was composed by Don McGlashan. 'What Love Can Do' was written for Matariki by McGlashan and sung by Bella Kalolo. The soundtrack was given a 4 out of 5 rating by The New Zealand Herald.

=== Track listing ===
1. "What Love Can Do" (Bella Kalolo & The GLCC Youth Choir) - 3:24
2. "Siva Mai" (Te Vaka) - 4:12
3. "Ride With Us" (Boss) - 3:45
4. "Rude Mechanicals" (Pitch Black) - 5:57
5. "These Roses" (Gin Wigmore) - 3:11
6. "Teine Ole Atun'u" (Jamoa Jam) - 3:30
7. "Fools Love (Matariki Mix)" (Misfits of Science) - 3:44
8. "Raining Blood" (Concord Dawn) - 3:00
9. "E Sio Vare Vare" (Tongareva 5 with Mr Taia) - 1:58
10. "Sneaky Sneaky Dog Friend" (Connan and the Mockasins) - 3:53
11. "Bolero Bamboos" (Bill Sevesi) - 3:44
12. "Cupid" (The Brunettes) - 3:01
13. "Mum" (Prince Tui Teka) - 3:11
14. "Sister Risk" (The Phoenix Foundation) - 4:50
15. "Feels Like Rain" (The StoneFeather Blues Experience) - 4:50

== Release ==
The film held its world premiere on 11 September 2010 at the Toronto International Film Festival. It screened in the Contemporary World Cinema section. It also screened at the 2010 Hof International Film Festival in Germany in late October. The film was released in cinemas in New Zealand on 18 November 2010, and on DVD in mid-2011.

== Reception ==
At the 2010 Toronto International Film Festival, Matariki received three sold out screenings, and also received several sold out screenings at the 2010 Hof International Film Festival.

The film received highly positive reviews. The New Zealand Herald gave Matariki 4 stars out of 5, calling the film "dramatic and affecting". Critic Peter Calder praised the film as "a touching series of intersecting stories about the fragility of life and the redeeming power of love", and described the soundtrack by composer Don McGlashan as "a cracker". Graeme Tuckett of The Dominion Post gave the film a 4 out of 5 star review saying it "won me over" and that the relationships in the film have a "lovely and unforced believability". 3 News movie reviewer Kate Rogers awarded the film 3 and a half stars out 4 describing the "multicultural heart" as one of the film's strengths. Actor Temuera Morrison who saw the film in Toronto, said he was "absolutely blown away" and described the film as a "slice of reality in South Auckland".

=== Accolades ===
Matariki was acknowledged at both the Aotearoa Film & Television Awards and the Brussels International Independent Film Festival Awards

Awards and Nominations
| Award | Category | Nominee | Result |
|---|---|---|---|
| Aotearoa Film & Television Awards | Outstanding Feature Film Debut | Michael Bennett | Nominated |
| Aotearoa Film & Television Awards | Best Supporting Actor in a Feature Film | Edwin Wright | Nominated |
| Aotearoa Film & Television Awards | Best Supporting Actress in a Feature Film | Sara Wiseman | Won |
| Aotearoa Film & Television Awards | Best Supporting Actress in a Feature Film | Alix Bushnell | Nominated |
| Aotearoa Film & Television Awards | Best Original Music in a Feature Film | Don McGlashan | Nominated |
| Aotearoa Film & Television Awards | Best Production Design in a Feature Film | Miro Harre | Nominated |
| Brussels International Independent Film Festival Awards | Best Director | Michael Bennett | Won |
| Brussels International Independent Film Festival Awards | Best Actor | Iaheto Ah Hi | Won |
| Script Writers Awards New Zealand | Best Feature Film Script | Michael Bennett & Gavin Strawhan | Won |
