= Roseanne Liang =

New Zealand film director

- Born: New Zealand
- Education: University of Auckland
- Occupation: Filmmaker
- Years active: 2003–present
- Spouse: Stephen Harris
- Children: 2

Roseanne Liang is a New Zealand film director. Her first feature film, My Wedding and Other Secrets, was the first theatrically released feature film made by a Chinese New Zealander and became 2011's highest grossing local feature film. She also co-created, directed, and co-wrote the 2021 TV series Creamerie.

== Early life ==
Liang was born in New Zealand to Hong Kong emigrants. Her parents were doctors, one was a doctor and the other a nurse. She has two sisters. Liang attended St Cuthbert's College, Auckland, and was dux of the school in 1995.

She went on to study computer science at the University of Auckland. She graduated with a Masters in Creative and Performing Arts in 2003.

== Career ==
Liang made her directorial debut with the autobiographical documentary film Banana in a Nutshell (2005), which was about her own cross-cultural romance with a Pākehā. The film won Best Documentary at DOCNZ International Documentary Film Festival. Liang won Best Director of Documentary Films at Asian Festival of First Films. The film was screened at New Zealand International Film Festival 2005, where she met John Barnett, a producer from South Pacific Pictures, who requested a feature length adaptation of the documentary.

That project later became the romantic comedy My Wedding and Other Secrets (2011). The film won Best Actress and Best Screenplay Award for a feature film at the Aotearoa Film & Television Awards.

Liang also directed the short film Take 3, which won awards in 2007 at the Berlin and Valladolid Film Festivals, and the hit web series Flat3 and Friday Night Bites. In 2008, she was awarded Women in Film and Television International's Woman to Watch Award for Women in Film and Television.

Liang is a part of the Thousand Apologies Collective, a creative cohort of seven writers and filmmakers based in Auckland, New Zealand, which includes Shuchi Kothari and Serina Pearson. They made their television debut with their pan-Asian sketch comedy series A Thousand Apologies on TV3, New Zealand's first prime time Asian program. Kothari and Liang later cofounded the Pan-Asian Screen Collective with others in August 2018 to support Asian filmmakers in New Zealand.

In 2017, she directed a short film Do No Harm, which was selected to be shown at the Manhattan Short film festival and the 2017 Sundance Film Festival.

In 2020, Liang directed and co-wrote Shadow in the Cloud, a WWII action-horror film, starring Chloë Grace Moretz from a story treatment by Max Landis. It debuted at the 2020 Toronto International Film Festival, where it won the People's Choice Award. In the same year, Liang also contributed to The Women Writers' Handbook.

== Filmography ==
Short film

Year	Title	Director	Writer
2005	Rest Stop	Yes	No
2008	Take 3	Yes	Yes
2015	Sugar Hit	Yes	Yes
2017	Do No Harm	Yes	Yes

Documentary film

- Banana in a Nutshell (2005)

Feature film

Year	Title	Director	Writer
2011	My Wedding and Other Secrets	Yes	Yes
2020	Shadow in the Cloud	Yes	Yes

Television

Year	Title	Director	Writer
2008	A Thousand Apologies	Yes	Yes
2021	Creamerie	Yes	Yes
2024	Avatar: The Last Airbender	Yes	No
2025	Murderbot	Yes	No

Web series

Year	Title	Director	Writer	Notes
2013	Flat3	Yes	Yes	12 episodes
2016–2018	Friday Night Bites	Yes	Yes	
2017	Unboxed	Yes	No	6 episodes

== Personal life ==
Liang is married to Stephen Harris, the subject of Banana in a Nutshell. They have two children.

== Accolades ==
- SPADA New Filmmaker of the Year (2005)
- Best Director of Documentary Films — Asian Festival of First Films
- Sir Peter Blake Leadership Award (2012)
