= Bronwyn Turei =

New Zealand actress and singer

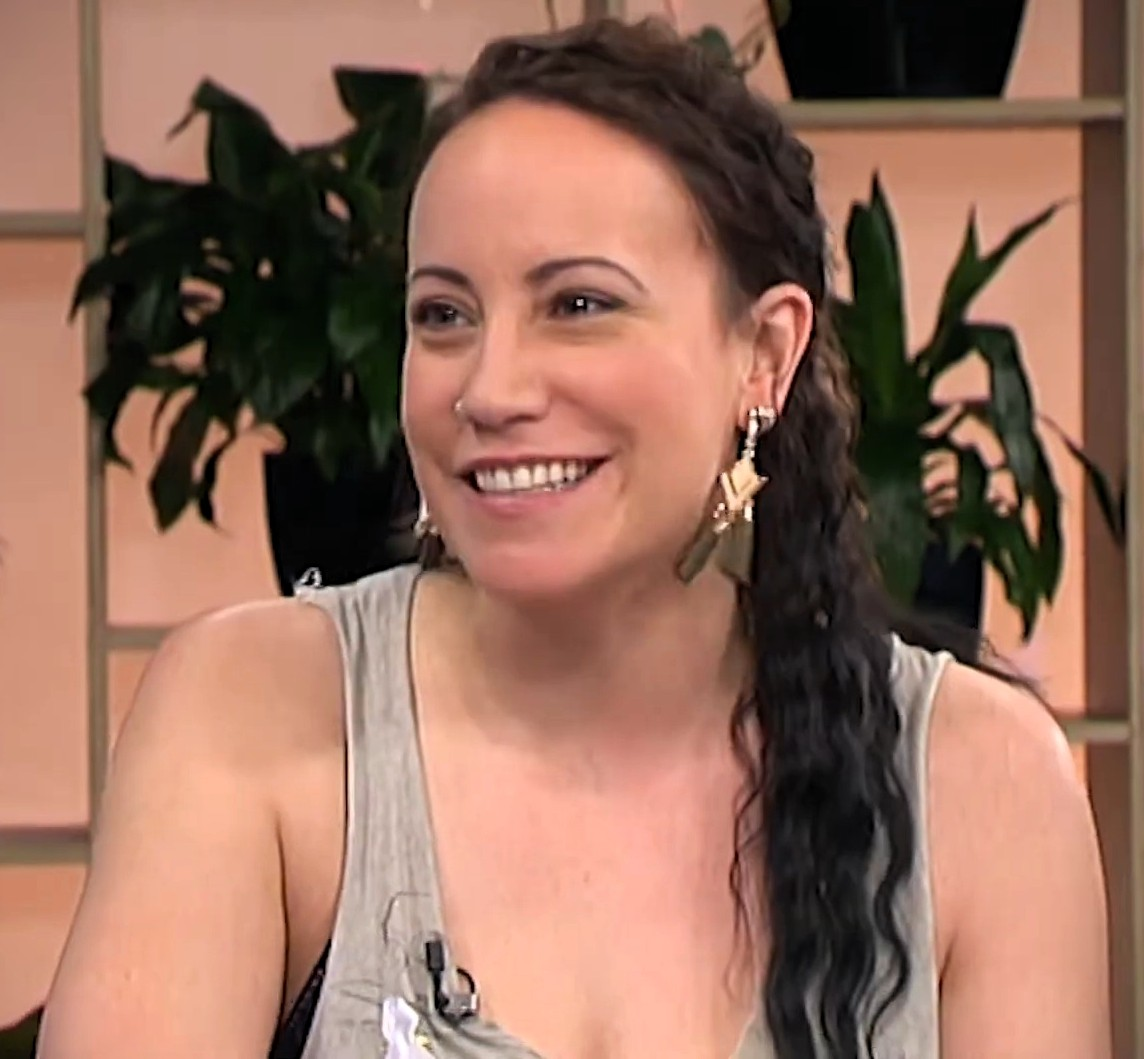
- Turei in 2018
- Born: 1984 (age 41–42); Gisborne, New Zealand
- Occupations: Actress, singer

Bronwyn Turei (born 1984) is a New Zealand actress and singer. She played Cordelia "Cody" Latimer in the New Zealand television comedy/drama series Go Girls (2009).

== Early life ==
Born in Gisborne, New Zealand, she attended Gisborne Girls' High School and was Head Prefect in 2001. She moved to Auckland to attend the Unitec School of Performing Arts. Turei is of Ngāti Porou tribal ancestry, through her father.

Turei made her stage debut at the age of nine when she played a workhouse boy in a local production of Oliver Twist. At high school in Gisborne, she had distinctive achievements in oratory, music, drama and korero Māori. She was one of 18 students chosen from an applicant pool of 160 to attend Unitec School of Performing Arts, that same year travelling to London to study at The Globe with the New Zealand Young Shakespeare Company.

Turei released an album, Empty Room in 2006, available for preview on Myspace.

She currently resides in Auckland, New Zealand.

== Filmography ==
=== Television ===
Year	Series	Role	Note
2015	The Brokenwood Mysteries	Holly Collins	Blood Pink (Season 2, Episode 4)
2009-2012	Go Girls	Cody Latimer	
2009-2012	The Warning	Mrs. Winters	Short
2005	Interrogation	Remandee	True Confessions (Season 1, Episode 12)
