= Celeste Wong =

New Zealand actress and barista

- Born: New Zealand
- Other names: Girl in the Café
- Occupations: Actress, barista, blogger

Celeste Wong is a Chinese-New Zealand actress, barista and coffee blogger, under the nickname Girl in the Café.

== Acting ==
Wong played a dancer in a 2004 episode of the Australian series Stringers. Wong played Melanie in the 2011 New Zealand film My Wedding and Other Secrets, and a psychiatrist in Stonehouse in 2023.

== Coffee ==
Wong has worked in coffee shops in Dunedin, Melbourne and London.

She began blogging about coffee as "Girl in the Café".

As a coffee expert, she has contributed to Director and Olive magazines, The Art Newspaper and BBC One's Saturday Kitchen.
