= Matai Smith =

New Zealand television presenter

Matai Rangi Smith
- Born: Matai Rangi Smith; 2 May 1977 (age 49); Gisborne, New Zealand
- Occupation: Television presenter
- Years active: 1996–present
- Television: Pukana, Homai Te Paki Paki, Korero Mai
- Spouse: Single

Matai Rangi Smith (born 2 May 1977) is a New Zealand television presenter.

== Personal life ==
Matai was born and raised in Gisborne, New Zealand and later moved to Auckland when he began working in Television in 1996. He speaks fluent Te Reo Maori and is of Rongowhakaata, Ngāi Tāmanuhiri and Ngāti Kahungunu descent. He is currently the General Manager for Iwi Radio station Tūranga FM and also hosts the Parakuihi show.

== Career ==
Matai was first seen as a host on children's show Pukana, an educational/variety show written entirely in Māori. He is better known as host of Korero Mai and Whanau, a drama series that teaches the Maori language to viewers. Matai has since hosted live karaoke show Homai Te Paki Paki, as well as appearing as a regular host on Good Morning between 2007 and 2012. He is one of very few personalities who has worked for most of New Zealand's main national television networks, including Māori Television, TVNZ and TV3.

== Awards ==
In 2005, 2006 and 2007 Matai won Best Te Reo Māori Television Presenter (Male) at the Māori Media Awards. Then in 2012, he won Best Presenter in the entertainment/factual category at the 2012 New Zealand Television Awards for his work on Homai Te Paki Paki.
