= Step Dave =

- Genre: Comedy drama Romantic comedy Farce
- Created by: Kate McDermott
- Starring: Sia Trokenheim; Jono Kenyon; Rawiri Jobe; Tania Nolan; Aidee Walker
- Composers: Joel Haines; Lukasz Buda; Conrad Wedde; Samuel Scott
- Country of origin: New Zealand
- Original language: English
- No. of series: 2
- No. of episodes: 26 (list of episodes)

Production
- Executive producers: Kelly Martin; Chris Bailey
- Producer: Mark Beesley
- Cinematography: Rewa Harre
- Running time: 60 minutes
- Production company: South Pacific Pictures

Original release
- Network: TV2
- Release: 11 February 2014 – 24 November 2015

Step Dave is a New Zealand farcical comedy-drama television series written by Kate McDermott. It began airing its first series in New Zealand on 11 February 2014. It was renewed for a second series, which began airing on 1 September 2015. Jono Kenyon announced the show would not be returning for a third series.

== Premise ==
Dave Robinson, a 24-year-old New Zealand bartender, falls in love with Cara Gray, a 39-year-old day spa co-owner with three children.

== Cast and characters ==
=== Main cast ===
- Sia Trokenheim as Cara Gray
- Jono Kenyon as Dave Robinson
- Rawiri Jobe as Aaron "Azza", Dave's flatmate
- Tania Nolan as Julia Deering, Cara's sister
- Aidee Walker as Jenny "Jen", Cara's best friend and business partner

=== Guest cast ===
- Jaime McDermott as Whitney
- Nic Sampson as Hamish
- Lucinda Hare as Kat
- Andrea Kelland as Lucy
- Jacob Tomuri as Nathan
- Willa O'Neill as Anne-Marie
- Ascia Maybury as Bianca-Faye
- Jason Hood as Steven
- Josh Thomson as Sal
- Jamaica Vaughan as Rose Russell
- Joy Buckle as Pip
- Robert Jozinović as Ryan

=== Secondary cast ===
- William Wallace as Phillip Deering, Julia's husband
- Lisa Harrow as Marion Gray, Cara's ex-mother-in-law
- Maya Wyatt as Scarlett Gray, Cara's 16-year-old daughter
- Lily Powell as Jasmine Gray, Cara's 13-year-old daughter
- George Beca as Logan Gray, Cara's 8-year-old son
- J.J. Fong as Betty
- Tainui Tukiwaho as Hugo, Dave's boss

=== Recurring cast ===
- Arlo Gibson as Liam Hamilton
- Richard Lambeth as Dylan
- Peter Muller as Michael
- Kimberley Crossman as Stacey, Dave's ex-girlfriend (series 1)
- Nathalie Boltt as Natalie Robinson, Dave's mother
- Francis Mountjoy as Alec
- Millen Baird as Stewart "Stewie" Gray, Cara's ex-husband
- Amanda Tito as Georgia
- Delaney Tabron as Xandra, Hugo's friend (series 2)
- Aaron Jeffery as Warren Robinson, Dave's father (series 2)
- Shane Cortese as Eugene Russell (series 2)

== Series overview ==
Series	Episodes	Originally released	
Series	Episodes	First released	Last released
1	13	11 February 2014	6 May 2014
2	13	1 September 2015	24 November 2015

=== Series 1 (2014) ===
No. overall	No. in series	Title	Directed by	Written by	Original release date
1	1	"Starry Eyed"	Britta Hawkins	Kate McDermott	11 February 2014
Cara gets stuck in a pub toilet while on a blind date, and injures her ankle climbing out the window. Dave takes her to hospital and is attracted to her, but she turns down his offer of anything more. He returns her shoe the following day and persuades her to go on a date with him, but it ends badly when he discovers she is fifteen years older than him and has three children. He can't stop thinking of her and they reunite.
2	2	"Early Days"	Britta Hawkins	Kate McDermott	18 February 2014
3	3	"The Clown and the Bear"	Murray Keane	Kate McDermott	25 February 2014
4	4	"Worlds Collide"	Murray Keane	Kate McDermott	4 March 2014
5	5	"My Room"	Michael Hurst	Rachel Lang	11 March 2014
6	6	"Knocked-Up Natalie"	Michael Hurst	James Griffin	18 March 2014
7	7	"Promise and Deliver"	Michael Hurst	Kate McDermott	25 March 2014
8	8	"Rock Bands and Reefer"	John Laing	Sarah Nathan and Kate McDermott	1 April 2014
9	9	"Goodbye Princess"	John Laing	Steven Zanoski, Rachel Lang and Kate McDermott	8 April 2014
10	10	"Grow Up"	Oliver Driver	Rachel Lang	15 April 2014
11	11	"Crowded House"	Oliver Driver	Kate McDermott	22 April 2014
12	12	"Let It Go"	Britta Hawkins	Gavin Strawhan and Kate McDermott	29 April 2014
13	13	"No More Escaping"	Britta Hawkins	Kate McDermott	6 May 2014
Dave is trying to forget Cara by having much casual sex before he goes overseas. When Cara and Dave bump into each other at Dylan and Alec's wedding, it's awkward.

=== Series 2 (2015) ===
On 31 July 2014, the show was renewed for a second series of 13 episodes.

No. overall	No. in series	Title	Directed by	Written by	Original release date
14	1	"Stepping Up"	Oliver Driver	Kate McDermott	1 September 2015
15	2	"Mr Popular"	Oliver Driver	Gavin Strawhan	8 September 2015
16	3	"Threesome"	Murray Keane	Shoshana McCallum	15 September 2015
17	4	"Secrets"	Murray Keane	Karen Curtis	22 September 2015
18	5	"Good Lies"	Britta Hawkins	Kate McDermott	29 September 2015
19	6	"Good Father Material"	Britta Hawkins	Max Currie and Kate McDermott	6 October 2015
20	7	"Trust Me"	Britta Hawkins	Aidee Walker and Kate McDermott	13 October 2015
21	8	"Mr Wrong"	Ian Hughes	Gavin Strawhan	20 October 2015
22	9	"The Home-wrecker"	Ian Hughes	Kate McDermott	27 October 2015
23	10	"Inappropriate"	Murray Keane	Gavin Strawhan	3 November 2015
24	11	"Make Believe"	Murray Keane	Shoshana McCallum and Kate McDermott	10 November 2015
25	12	"Kids"	Michael Hurst	Karen Curtis and Kate McDermott	17 November 2015
26	13	"Will You, Won't You?"	Michael Hurst	Kate McDermott	24 November 2015

== International broadcast ==
- Australia – Step Dave began airing on GEM from 7 January 2015, however it was pulled from the channel after just one episode. It has since been airing on channel 9 at 2.00am on Fridays since 2016.

== Adaptation ==
=== Malaysian Mandarin version ===
Malaysia pay TV provider Astro has officially confirmed to adapt the series in Malaysian Mandarin following their partnership with All3Media, owner of the series production house South Pacific Pictures. The series will set to be premiered in June 2025.

=== U.S. version ===
It was announced it is going to get a remake which has been put into development by NBC, which Sean Hayes will be among the executive producers, alongside South Pacific Pictures' Kelly Martin and Chris Bailey. The American version will be written by Emily Cutler, who has previously worked on The Odd Couple and Community.

== DVD release ==
Title	Set details	DVD release dates
Title	Set details	Region 4
Step Dave	Discs: 3; Episodes: 13	14 May 2014
