= Raising Waylon =

- Genre: Romantic comedy
- Written by: Neena Beber
- Directed by: Sam Pillsbury
- Starring: Thomas Gibson; Poppy Montgomery; Doris Roberts; Catherine Boniface; Jeremy Bergman; Ross Anderson; Susan Brady
- Music by: Kevin Kliesch Mader
- Country of origin: United States
- Original language: English

Production
- Executive producers: Neena Beber; Dave Wigutow
- Producer: Steve Sachs
- Cinematography: James Bartle
- Editor: Margaret Guinee
- Running time: 95 minutes
- Production companies: Dan Wigutow Productions; Sony Pictures Television

Original release
- Network: CBS
- Release: February 22, 2004

Raising Waylon is a 2004 American romantic comedy television film directed by Sam Pillsbury. The film was produced by Dan Wigutow Productions and Sony Pictures Television and premiered on CBS on February 22, 2004.

== Synopsis ==
Reginald and Julia are obliged to raise the son of their friends who have died in an accident, because they are his godfather and godmother.

== Cast ==
- Thomas Gibson: Reginald Robellati
- Poppy Montgomery: Julia Bellows
- Doris Roberts: Marie
- Catherine Boniface: Tracy
- Jeremy Bergman: Waylon Moore
- Ross Anderson: M. Myers
- Susan Brady: Terry Allen
- Katrina Browne: Valerie
- Latham Gaines: Paul
- Craig Hall: Alex
- Elizabeth Hawthorne: Judge Harriet Caldwell
- John Leigh: Jeremy
- Jim McLarty: Craig Stanfill
- Ingrid Park: Kim
- Jennifer Rucker: Receptionist
- Michael Saccente: Jay Hessler
- Roy Snow: Randell
- Xavier Strom: Sam Stanfill
- Jared Tobin: Jimmy
- Tandi Wright: Tina Stanfill
