= Creamerie =

New Zealand television series

- Genre: Dark comedy Dramedy; Post-apocalyptic fiction Dystopian fiction Thriller
- Created by: Roseanne Liang; J.J. Fong; Perlina Lau; Ally Xue
- Written by: Kirsty Fisher; Roseanne Liang; Dan Musgrove; Shoshana McCallum
- Directed by: Roseanne Liang
- Starring: Ally Xue; J.J. Fong; Perlina Lau; Jay Ryan; Tandi Wright
- Music by: Mahuia Bridgman-Cooper
- Country of origin: New Zealand
- Original language: English
- No. of series: 2
- No. of episodes: 12

Production
- Executive producer: Tony Ayres
- Producer: Bronwynn Bakker
- Production company: Flat 3 Productions

Original release
- Network: TVNZ OnDemand; TVNZ 2
- Release: 19 April 2021 – 14 July 2023

Creamerie is a black comedy web series from New Zealand that launched in 2021 on TVNZ OnDemand. It explores a world in which nearly all men have died from a virus, and three friends, played by Perlina Lau, J.J. Fong, and Ally Xue, run a dairy farm under the watchful eye of Wellness, the local governing body. The series was created by Lau, Fong, Xue, and director Roseanne Liang.

== Plot ==
Alex, Jaime and Pip are three friends living on a New Zealand dairy farm eight years after all men on Earth have been killed by a mysterious virus. An organisation called Wellness now runs their community and controls repopulation via lottery, using sperm saved from old sperm banks. The friends' lives are thrown into disarray when they encounter a man whom they assume to be the last surviving man in the world. As season 1 concludes and season 2 begins, they stumble upon a laboratory where some of the very few surviving men are being held hostage, tied to their chairs, gagged and naked, with pumping devices attached to their genitalia, extracting their semen which will then be used to impregnate women.

== Cast ==
=== Main ===
- Ally Xue as Alex, an outspoken critic of the Wellness organization
- J.J. Fong as Jaime, a mother mourning the loss of her husband and son
- Perlina Lau as Pip, an optimist who works for the Wellness organization
- Jay Ryan as Bobby, a man who has survived the virus believed to have killed every man on Earth
- Tandi Wright as Lane, the head of Wellness

=== Recurring ===
- Kimberley Crossman as Michelle
- Nikki Si'ulepa as Constance
- Helene Wong as Tilda
- Rachel House as Doc Harvey
- Yoson An as Jackson, Jaime's deceased husband
- Renee Lyons as Viv
- Brynley Stent as Lynley
- Ava Diakhaby as Ada
- Angella Dravid as Brandi
- Keborah Torrance as Bernice
- Sara Wiseman as Hunter

== Episodes ==
=== Season 1 ===
No. overall	No. in season	Directed by	Written by	Original release date
1	1	Roseanne Liang	Kirsty Fisher and Roseanne Liang	19 April 2021
Eight years after a viral plague killed all men, three dairy farmers from Hiro Valley accidentally run over the last surviving male human on the planet.
2	2	Roseanne Liang	Dan Musgrove and Roseanne Liang	19 April 2021
Arguments flare as Pip, Jamie and Alex decide what to do with the Man (Bobby). Pip wants to hand him over to the wellness authorities right now - and harbouring a man is an offence punishable by Perm.
3	3	Roseanne Liang	Shoshana McCallum and Roseanne Liang	19 April 2021
Alex gets to know her prisoner, Pip pushes down her feelings, and Jamie makes a choice that costs the women dearly.
4	4	Roseanne Liang	Dan Musgrove and Roseanne Liang	19 April 2021
After the raid on their farm, the women set out to find more male survivors.
5	5	Roseanne Liang	Shoshana McCallum and Roseanne Liang	19 April 2021
Pip and Alex must put aside their differences to save their friends from the Bounty Hunter.
6	6	Roseanne Liang	Kirsty Fisher and Roseanne Liang	19 April 2021
Pip races to rescue her friends and Bobby from the Wellness regime, but a figure from the past arrives to turn their world upside down.

=== Season 2 ===
No.	Title	Directed by	Written by	Original release date
1	7	Roseanne Liang	Roseanne Liang	14 July 2023
Reeling from Jackson's betrayal in Lane's underground man-milking facility - Team Creamerie faces a certain doom. Until an unlikely ally smashes through and causes untold chaos.
2	8	Roseanne Liang	Dan Musgrove	14 July 2023
Desperate to save her worst best friend, Jamie and the team seek help from a group of survivors who don't want to be found. Jackson reveals valuable intel that could help - but can he be trusted?
3	9	Roseanne Liang	Roseanne Liang	14 July 2023
Team Creamerie breaks into Lane's compound to save more male survivors, but their mission to bring her to justice exposes more cracks in their relationships, and leads them to a point of no return.
4	10	Roseanne Liang	Dan Musgrove	14 July 2023
Intent on exposing Lane's crimes to the country, Team Creamerie go on a road trip to the capital city to seek an audience with the Prime Minister.
5	11	Roseanne Liang	Dan Musgrove	14 July 2023
On the run from the authorities, Team Creamerie stumble into a mercenary Sea Captain's boat shed. The Captain invites them into the Underground, a secret network of tunnels under the city where the law can't touch them - but safe haven comes at a steep price.
6	12	Roseanne Liang	Roseanne Liang and Dan Musgrove	14 July 2023
Bobby finds an unlikely connection with the Sea Captain, while Jaime, Alex and Pip play a high-stakes game and land themselves in very difficult waters.

== Production ==
NZ On Air announced funding for the series in May 2019. Filming began in and around the Auckland region, including West Auckland, in 2020, but was paused after six weeks when lockdowns for the COVID-19 pandemic began. Filming resumed with the implementation of masks, social distancing, and other precautions, and was completed in September 2020.

In May 2022, Creamerie was renewed for a second season, which filmed from October 2022 to February 2023. This second season was released domestically on July 14, with Australian and US release dates later in the summer.

== Reception ==
Since the programme's premiere it has received critical acclaim, with critics praising the programme's humour, casting, unique premise, and for the programme's ability to maintain a deft balance between its humorous and dramatic aspects. Positive comparisons were made to Y: The Last Man and The Handmaid's Tale; with many critics calling the programme an inversion of the latter. Although recurring criticisms of the programme was that it needed to put a bit more emphasis on its dramatic moments given the nature of the story it is trying to tell and that it needed to provide more backstory.

Writing for The Sydney Morning Herald, Kylie Northover called Creamerie "masterful, with deadpan humour and a terrific cast." James Croot of Stuff NZ wrote a glowing review, stating "Creamerie delivers full-bodied and flavoured, adult humour with no trace of cheese." Chelsea McLaughlin from Mamamia gave the programme a positive review writing that "Creamerie builds a fascinating world and introduces us to three incredibly real, well-rounded characters in Alex, Jamie and Pip. It tackles some really dark topics and seems to know exactly when to lean in and lean out of its hilarity... but you'll be left thinking about it long after the final credits." In her rave review from ScreenHub, Mel Campbell said, "The plotting is surprisingly suspenseful, whipping up dollops of twists in every episode.... Ultimately, this speculative treat is intellectually substantial – and emotionally satisfying."

In his commendatory second season review critic Mike Hale from The New York Times said "What distinguishes “Creamerie” is how seamlessly it incorporates the raunchy, silly, casually comic vibe of those online shorts (along with their female point of view) into a sci-fi-series framework. It’s a clever but unassuming show, which is why its package of laughs, sentiment, consciousness raising and low-budget Saturday-serial action has considerable appeal." He went on to praise actress Tandi Wright's performance stating that her acting was "Excellent".

== Awards ==
Creamerie won the NZ On Air Best Drama Series award at the 2021 New Zealand Television Awards.
