= Rachel Lang =

New Zealand screenwriter, producer and actor

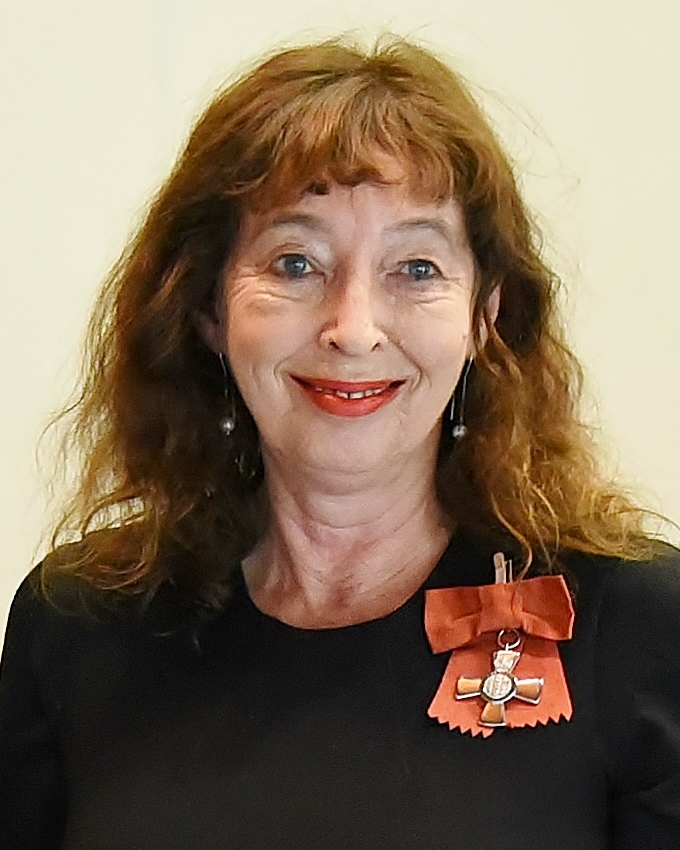
Lang in 2017

Rachel Alison Mary Lang MNZM is a New Zealand television screenwriter, executive producer and actor. She co-created the television series Outrageous Fortune, Go Girls, This Is Not My Life, Mercy Peak, Nothing Trivial, The Blue Rose, and Filthy Rich. She was appointed a Member of the New Zealand Order of Merit, for services to television, in the 2017 Queen's Birthday Honours.

== Career ==
Lang graduated from Toi Whakaari: New Zealand Drama School in 1982 with a Diploma in Acting. Lang's first work in script writing was as a script editor at TVNZ in the 1980s. She worked on episodes of Shark in the Park, Open House and movie Mark II.

From 1992 until 2000 she worked on Shortland Street, starting as a story liner then moving on to roles as story editor and executive producer. She was the first New Zealander employed as story editor on the show, with previous story editors employed from Australia.

In 1999 she created Jackson's Wharf, one of her first collaborations with Gavin Strawhan. They would go on to work together on Mercy Peak and Maddigan's Quest.

== Filmography ==
=== Film ===
Title	Year	Credited as	Notes
Title	Year	Writer	Notes
13 Suspects	2018	Yes	Short film

=== Television ===
Title	Year	Credited as			Network	Notes
Title	Year	Creator	Writer	Executive producer	Network	Notes
Open House	1986–87	No	No	No	Television One	Story editor
Gloss	1987	No	No	No	Network Two	Script editor
Shark in the Park	1989–91	No	No	No	Television One	Story editor Script editor
Shortland Street	1992	No	No	No	Channel 2	Storyliner
City Life	1998	No	Yes (1)	Yes	TV2	
Lawless	1999	Devised	No	No	TV2	Television film Script editor
Jackson's Wharf	1999–2001	Yes	Yes (8)	Yes	TV2	Executive producer (season 2)
Lawless: Dead Evidence	2000	Yes	No	No	TV2	Television film
Lawless: Beyond Justice	2001	Yes	No	No	TV2	Television film Script editor
Mercy Peak	2001–04	Yes	Yes (8)	Yes	TV One	
Outrageous Fortune	2005–10	Yes	Yes (35)	Yes	TV3	Script editor (series 3–6)
Maddigan's Quest	2006	Developer	Yes (8)	No	TV3	Script editor
Honest	2008	Yes	No	No	ITV	
Go Girls	2009–13	Yes	Yes (22)	Yes	TV2	
This Is Not My Life	2010	Yes	Yes (4)	Yes	TV One	
The Almighty Johnsons	2011–12	Yes	Yes (2)	Yes	TV3	Executive producer (series 1–2: 22 episodes)
Nothing Trivial	2011–14	Yes	Yes (20)	Yes	TV One	
The Blue Rose	2013	Yes	Yes (7)	Yes	TV3	
Step Dave	2014	No	Yes (3)	No	TV2	
When We Go to War	2015	No	Yes (4)	No	TV One	
Westside	2015–20	Yes	Yes (4)	No	Three	
Filthy Rich	2016–17	Yes	Yes (16)	Yes	TVNZ 2	
Hyde & Seek	2016	Yes	Yes (5)	No	Nine Network	
Dirty Laundry	2017	Yes	No	Yes	TVNZ 1	
Bad Mothers	2019	Yes	Yes (5)	Yes	Nine Network	

== Awards ==
Year	Award	Category	Title	Result
1995	New Zealand Film and Television Awards	Best Script	Shortland Street	Nominated
2005	Qantas Television Awards	Best Script - Non-Factual Programme or Series	Outrageous Fortune, "The Cause of this Defect"	Won
2006	Qantas Television Awards	Best Script - Non-Factual Programme or Series	Outrageous Fortune	Nominated
2007	Qantas Television Awards	Best Script - Non-Factual Programme or Series	Outrageous Fortune	Nominated
2008	Qantas Television Awards	Best Script, Drama/Comedy Programme	Outrageous Fortune	Won
2009	Qantas Television Awards	Best Script, Drama/Comedy Programme	Outrageous Fortune	Won
2010	Qantas Television Awards	Best Script, Drama/Comedy Programme	Go Girls	Nominated
2006	Air New Zealand Screen Awards	Best Script - Drama Series or Serial	Outrageous Fortune	Nominated
2007	Air New Zealand Screen Awards	Best Script, Drama - Television	Outrageous Fortune, episode 16	Nominated
2007	Air New Zealand Screen Awards	Best Script, Drama - Television	Maddigan's Quest, episode 5	Nominated
2012	Monte Carlo TV Festival	Outstanding International Producer - Drama Series	Nothing Trivial	Nominated
