= This Is Not My Life =

New Zealand mystery thriller television series

- Genre: Mystery-thriller
- Created by: Rachel Lang; Gavin Strawhan; Jason Daniel
- Developed by: Rachel Lang; Gavin Strawhan; Vanessa Alexander; Peter Cox
- Written by: Gavin Strawhan; Peter Cox; Rachel Lang
- Story by: Rachel Lang; Gavin Strawhan; Vanessa Alexander; Peter Cox
- Directed by: Rob Sarkies; Peter Salmon
- Starring: Charles Mesure; Tandi Wright; Miriama McDowell
- Composer: Don McGlashan
- Country of origin: New Zealand
- Original language: English
- No. of seasons: 1
- No. of episodes: 13

Production
- Executive producers: Gavin Strawhan; Rachel Lang; Steven O'Meagher; Tim White
- Producer: Tim Sanders
- Cinematography: Andrew Commis
- Editor: Paul Maxwell
- Production companies: Desert Road; Southern Light Films

Original release
- Network: TV One
- Release: 29 July – 14 October 2010

This Is Not My Life is a New Zealand television mystery-thriller which originally aired from 29 July to 14 October 2010 on Television New Zealand's TV One.

== Plot ==
Set in the 2020s, the show centres on Alec Ross, who awakes one morning to find that he doesn't know who or where he is and doesn't recognise his wife or children. The story is set in the fictional town of Waimoana.

== Cast and characters ==
=== Main ===
- Charles Mesure as Alec Ross, Alec wakes one morning to find himself in a life he doesn't believe is his. He sets out on a mission to find the truth of where he comes from and what the real truth is behind Waimoana.
- Tandi Wright as Callie Ross, Callie is Alec's wife and mother to his two children. Her greatest desire is to have the perfect family and will do almost anything it takes to keep it.
- Miriama McDowell as Jessica Wilmott, Jessica works as a cleaner at Waimoana Water. She befriends Alec and becomes his ally in digging the secrets from Waimoana.
- Tania Nolan as Dr Natasha Collins, Natasha is Alec's family's doctor at Waimoana's Wellness Clinic. She has some limited knowledge of the goings-on in Waimoana.
- Steven A. Davis as Gordy Leach, Gordy works for the surveillance company who makes sure everything in Waimoana stays safe. He has a deep-set desire to be a knight in shining armour.

=== Recurring ===
- John Bach as Harry Sheridan, A Waimoana executive who Alec has vague memories of from before his current life. Alec believes that he has something crucial to do with the mystery.
- Joel Tobeck as Richard Foster, He runs the Waimoana surveillance team and it is his job to make sure nothing is out of place. It is no surprise then that Alec Ross very quickly catches his attention.
- Peter Muller as Stephen Lovritch, Alec's boss at Waimoana Water.
- Katherine Kennard as Hope Lovritch, Stephen's wife. In the past she has had an affair with Alec.
- Alison Bruce as Jude, Alec's PA at Waimoana Water. She finds herself often holding the fort whenever he steps out for golf or on his own errands.
- Ariana Brunet as Becky Ross, Alec's young daughter, she is often plagued with nightmares of a green door and a 'bad man' called Harry.
- Tom Cameron as Christian Ross, Alec's teenage son and who having a secret relationship with Paige.
- Alexandra Foster as Paige Lovritch, Stephen and Hope's teenage daughter, Paige's sexual relationship with Christian causes a lot of tension between Callie and Hope when it is discovered.

=== Guest ===
- Matthew Sunderland as The Cleaner
- Simon Prast as Mike

== Production ==
The series is created and written by Rachel Lang and Gavin Strawhan and directed by Rob Sarkies and Peter Salmon. Thirteen episodes were produced. It was produced by Tim Sanders, and executive produced by Gavin Strawhan, Rachel Lang, Steven O'Meagher, and Tim White. Don McGlashan composed the score.

Though the show only lasted one season, it was announced in 2011 that American network ABC had purchased the series to adapt for an American audience.

== Episodes ==
No.	Title	Directed by	Written by	Original release date
1	"Episode 1"	Rob Sarkies	Gavin Strawhan	29 July 2010
2	"Episode 2"	Rob Sarkies	Gavin Strawhan & Peter Cox	29 July 2010
3	"Episode 3"	Peter Salmon	Rachel Lang	5 August 2010
4	"Episode 4"	Peter Salmon	Gavin Strawhan	12 August 2010
5	"Episode 5"	Rob Sarkies	Gavin Strawhan	19 August 2010
6	"Episode 6"	Rob Sarkies	Gavin Strawhan & Peter Cox	26 August 2010
7	"Episode 7"	Peter Salmon	Gavin Strawhan & Rachel Lang	2 September 2010
8	"Episode 8"	Peter Salmon	Gavin Strawhan	9 September 2010
9	"Episode 9"	Rob Sarkies	Gavin Strawhan	16 September 2010
10	"Episode 10"	Rob Sarkies	Rachel Lang	23 September 2010
11	"Episode 11"	Rob Sarkies	Gavin Strawhan	30 September 2010
12	"Episode 12"	Peter Salmon	Gavin Strawhan	7 October 2010
13	"Episode 13"	Peter Salmon	Rachel Lang	14 October 2010

== Awards and nominations ==
In the 2011 Aotearoa Film and Television Awards, the series earned three awards:

- Best Drama Programme
- Best Original Music: Don McGlashan
- Best Production Design: Tracey Collins

In addition, Miriama McDowell and Tandi Wright were nominated for Best Actress - Drama/Comedy, and there were nominations in the Cinematography - Drama/Comedy, Editing - Drama/Comedy, and Contribution to Design categories (Visual Effects Supervisor Peter McCully).

== Home media ==
The series was released on DVD on 29 June 2011.
