= Shackleton's Captain =

2012 New Zealand documentary

- Genre: Documentary, Adventure
- Written by: Leanne Pooley, Tim Woodhouse
- Directed by: Leanne Pooley
- Starring: Craig Parker, Charles Pierard, Hugh Barnard
- Country of origin: New Zealand
- Original language: English

Production
- Producer: James Heyward
- Running time: 85 minutes
- Production company: Gebrueder Beetz Filmproduktion

Original release
- Release: 1 April 2012

Shackleton's Captain is a 2012 New Zealand documentary directed by Leanne Pooley. The film chronicles the 1914–1917 Imperial Trans-Antarctic Expedition led by Sir Ernest Shackleton, focusing on Captain Frank Worsley's and his crew's experiences after their ship, the Endurance, was trapped and crushed by Antarctic pack ice.

== Production ==
Shackleton's Captain was produced by Gebrueder Beetz Filmproduktion in collaboration with Making Movies Directed by Leanne Pooley, it features Craig Parker as Captain Frank Worsley. The film utilizes historical accounts, including Worsley's diaries and Shackleton's memoirs, as primary sources.

== Cast ==
The cast is as follows:

- Craig Parker as Captain Frank Worsley
- Charles Pierard as Sir Ernest Shackleton
- Hugh Barnard as Tom Crean
- Blake Henshaw as John Vincent
- Tony Graimes as Timothy McCarthy
- William Hemming as Harry McNish
- Robert Ireland as Frank Wild

Additional roles are played by actors portraying the Endurance crew.

== Awards and nominations ==
Award	Date	Event	Result
Best Feature or Drama Documentary	2012	New Zealand Television Awards	Nominated
Best Cinematography Documentary/Factual	2012	New Zealand Television Awards	Won
Best Performance by an Actor (Craig Parker)	2012	New Zealand Television Awards	Nominated
