= My Wedding and Other Secrets =

- Directed by: Roseanne Liang
- Written by: Roseanne Liang; Angeline Loo
- Produced by: John Barnett; Paul Davis
- Starring: Michelle Ang; Matt Whelan
- Edited by: Eric de Beus
- Production company: South Pacific Pictures
- Release date: 17 March 2011
- Running time: 88 minutes
- Country: New Zealand
- Language: English; Cantonese; Mandarin

My Wedding and Other Secrets is a 2011 romantic comedy film directed by Roseanne Liang, written by Liang and Angeline Loo, and produced by South Pacific Pictures. The film is based on Liang's real-life cross-cultural romance.

== Plot ==
Emily Chu (Michelle Ang) is the youngest of three daughters of Chinese immigrant parents in Auckland, New Zealand. Her father, Dr Chu, and her mother expect her to follow her sisters into medicine. Emily instead wants to direct films, and enrols in computer science at the University of Auckland so that her parents will permit her to take film papers alongside it. At the university fencing club she meets James Harrison (Matt Whelan), a Pākehā student who plans to design computer games. They begin a relationship, which Emily keeps from her family. Her eldest sister, Susan, had earlier been threatened with disownment over a Pākehā boyfriend and ended the relationship. Emily, aware of this, avoids telling her parents and tries to keep both sides of her life intact. When Emily’s film project costs more than she can fund, she asks James to marry her so that she can claim a student grant. They marry in secret. Over the following year James becomes withdrawn about the arrangement. Eric, a classmate of Emily’s, learns of her situation and encourages her to make a documentary about it. After Susan’s former boyfriend dies in an accident and her parents react with indifference, Emily tells them about James.

Dr Chu offers to consider the marriage if James learns Mandarin. James studies for months, attending classes with Susan and practising at a Chinese fruit market, and then asks Dr Chu for Emily’s hand in Mandarin, bringing live crabs as a gift. Dr Chu gives his blessing. Mrs Chu does not, and tells Emily she will not attend a wedding.

Emily enters her documentary in the New Zealand International Film Festival and invites her parents and journalists to the premiere. James asks her not to screen it. She screens it anyway, and neither James nor her parents attend. The audience treats the film as a story of a daughter defying her parents, which was not Emily’s intention. James gives Emily papers to dissolve the marriage. Her sister Melanie marries her boyfriend Jason before Susan, prompting Dr Chu to raise a village custom in which a younger brother who marries first owes his elder brother a pair of trousers, and Emily’s secret comes out at the dinner table. After the wedding, Emily tells her mother that she is moving in with James and acknowledges what her mother has done for her. Her parents give their blessing, and Emily and James hold a wedding with their families.

== Themes ==
Significant themes in My Wedding and Other Secrets are those of cultural differences between migrant parents and their native-born children, of filial piety, and of love.

== Cast ==
Actor	Role
Michelle Ang	Emily, youngest Chu daughter
Matt Whelan	James, Emily's boyfriend and, later, husband
Kenneth Tsang	Dr. Chu
Cheng Pei-pei	Mrs. Grace Chu
Katlyn Wong	Susan Chu, eldest Chu daughter
Celeste Wong	Melanie Chu, middle Chu daughter
Simon London	Eric, Emily's film classmate
Todd Emerson	Tom, James' friend
Josh Thomson	Neil, James' friend
Johnny Barker	Danny, Susan's white ex-boyfriend
Mike Ginn	Vincent, a "jock lawyer" and son of Auntie May, a friend of Mrs. Chu's
Gareth Yuen	Jason, Melanie's boyfriend and, later, husband
Ravi Josula	Student

The choice to cast Kenneth Tsang and Cheng Pei-pei, as opposed to Australian Chinese and New Zealand Chinese actors and actresses, was intentional. On this decision, Roseanne Liang said, "What I wanted above all was authenticity", with her adding that, "All of the New Zealand and Australian Chinese actors were Chinese people who had grown up in New Zealand or Australia. I wanted actors who could speak Hong Kong-accented Cantonese as well as Cantonese-accented English". However, middle Chu daughter Melanie is portrayed by United Kingdom-based New Zealand Chinese actress Celeste Wong.

== Production ==
=== Development ===
Roseanne Liang sought to produce My Wedding and Other Secrets, originally titled Girl Meets Boy, a film based on her award-winning 2005 documentary Banana in a Nutshell, and entered into negotiations with South Pacific Pictures.

Filming for My Wedding and Other Secrets commenced on 14 February 2010 in Auckland.

=== Writing ===
Auckland-based Chinese New Zealander director and playwright Roseanne Liang and Angeline Loo, a friend of Liang's from university days, wrote the script, largely based on her life, for My Wedding and Other Secrets over four years. The character of Emily is based on Roseanne herself; James is based on Stephen Harris, Liang's boyfriend and later husband; and Dr. and Mrs. Chu and their daughters, Susan and Melanie, after Dr. and Mrs. Liang and their daughters, Renee and Rhea.

Liang was born in New Zealand and, like her character, was set to attend medical school and become a doctor; but, after realising her passion in film and others realising this too, attended University of Auckland, graduating with a Bachelor of Arts (B.A.) in Film/TV/Media Studies and a Bachelor of Science (BSc) in Computer Science and, later, a Master of Creative and Performing Arts (M.C.P.A.), concentrating in screen writing and directing.

Many of the events depicted in the film are also based on events that occurred during Liang and Harris' courtship, including Harris' learning basic Mandarin to win over Liang's parents' approval, as part of Chinese pre-wedding customs.

=== Music ===
The following songs are featured in the film:

- Bic Runga — "Hello, Hello"
- Bic Runga — "Mama Hao (媽媽好, Mama's the Best)"
- Bic Runga — "Say After Me"
- Bic Runga — "This Girl's Prepared for War"
- Esther Mitchell — "Shining Star"
- Johnny Barker — "Spiderman's Secret"
- K Nielson — "The Inhaler Song"
- Thrill Kill — "The Cad"
- Xiang Lan Li — "Mei Hua (Plum Blossom)"

== Reception ==
=== Critical reception ===
My Wedding and Other Secrets received positive reviews from major publications in New Zealand.

Peter Calder of the New Zealand Herald gave the film a five-star review, calling it "utterly charming" and the writing "The logical extension of the idea into a feature film has turned out a cracker - a heartfelt and mildly goofy comedy with a strong thread of pathos that tells a story we should all listen to".

Christine Powley of the Otago Daily Times also gave a five-star review and recommended viewers to "See it with your girlfriends for a nice time, then sneak back by yourself to enjoy just how well-crafted it is".

Richard Kuipers of Variety gave a favourable review, adding "Liang's brisk and breezy direction is complemented by Richard Harling's appropriately simple and effective lensing around Auckland. Snippets of Liang's Super 8 homemovies are delightful. Other technical work is solid on a modest budget".

=== Awards ===
- Melbourne International Film Festival 2011
- Asian American International Film Festival 2011 - winner Audience Choice award
- Feel Good Film Festival 2011
- Singafest Asian Film Festival (L.A.) 2011
- Friars Club Comedy Film Festival (N.Y.) 2011 - winner Audience Choice Award
- Hawaii International Film Festival 2011
- China Golden Rooster & Hundred Flowers Festival 2011
- San Diego Asian Film Festival 2011
- Australia New Zealand Film Festival (Singapore) 2011
- Aotearoa Film & Television Awards (NZ) 2011 – winner Best Screenplay (Roseanne Liang & Angeline Loo); winner Best Actress (Michelle Ang)
- Brussels Independent Film Festival 2011
- International Film Festival of India 2011
- San Joaquin International Film Festival 2012
- Chinese New Year Film Festival Auckland University (NZ) Feb 2012
- San Francisco International Asian American Film Festival 2012
- National Geographic All Roads Film Festival 2012
- New York Festivals International Film & Television Awards 2012 - Bronze World Medal for Feature Film
- Newport Beach International Film Festival 2012
- Lighthouse International Film Festival (N.J, USA) 2012
- Prescott Film Festival (AZ, USA) 2012
- Warburton Film Festival 2012
- International Film Festival of Fiji 2012
