= Craig Parker =

New Zealand actor

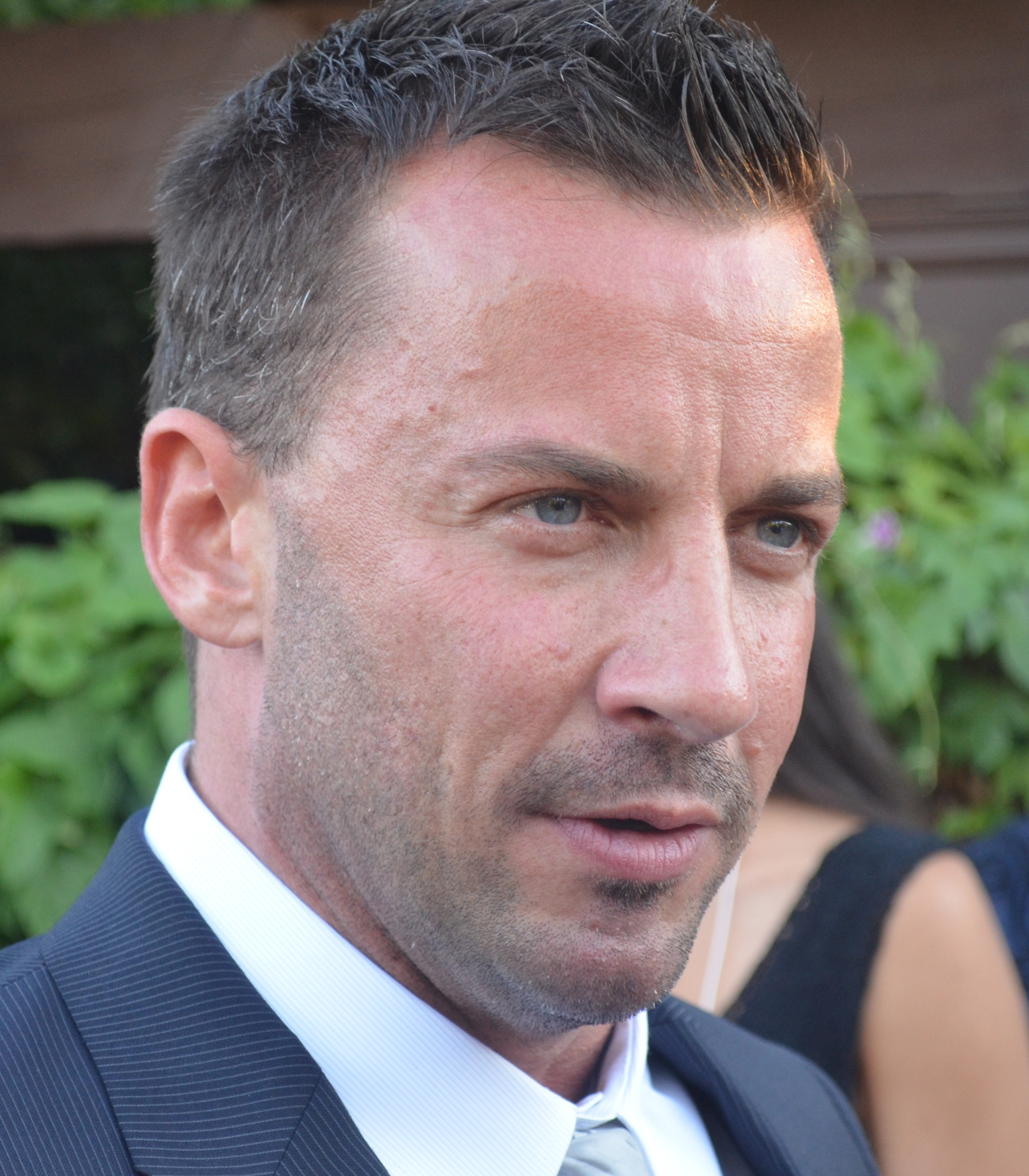
- Parker in 2012
- Born: 12 November 1970 (age 55); Suva, Fiji
- Citizenship: New Zealand • United States
- Occupation: Actor
- Years active: 1987–present

Craig Parker (born 12 November 1970) is a Fijian-born New Zealand and American actor, known for his roles as Guy Warner in the New Zealand soap opera Shortland Street (1992–96, 2007–08, 2020, 2023, 2024), Haldir in the Lord of the Rings films The Fellowship of the Ring (2001) and The Two Towers (2002), Darken Rahl in the syndicated television series Legend of the Seeker (2008–10), Gaius Claudius Glaber in the starz series Spartacus (2010, 2012), and Stéphane Narcisse in the CW television series Reign (2014–17).

== Career ==
Parker starred in the TVNZ soap opera Shortland Street as Guy Warner, a character that has made several return appearances. He made his soap debut in 1992, and last appeared in 2024.

Parker appeared as Haldir of Lórien in The Lord of the Rings film trilogy (2001-2002), and as Sabas in Underworld: Rise of the Lycans (2009). He starred in a number of New Zealand television series, most notable Mercy Peak (2001-2004), and Diplomatic Immunity (2009). He guest-starred on Xena: Warrior Princess, Young Hercules, Sleepy Hollow, and NCIS. He has also narrated many New Zealand documentaries and was the reigning champion of New Zealand's Celebrity Joker Poker in 2007.

Parker starred as Darken Rahl in Sam Raimi and Rob Tapert's syndicated television series Legend of the Seeker. He later starred as Gaius Claudius Glaber in the Starz original series Spartacus: Blood and Sand, and Spartacus: Vengeance which premiered on 22 January 2010 and is also produced by Raimi and Tapert.

From 2014 to 2017, Parker portrayed Lord Stéphane Narcisse, a powerful, manipulative, and wealthy French nobleman in The CW historical romantic drama series Reign. Initially introduced in a recurring role during season two, his character was promoted to the main cast for seasons three and four, appearing in a total of 56 episodes.

In 2018, he guest-starred as the Kree antagonist Taryan in Agents of S.H.I.E.L.D. and appeared in a recurring role during the first season of the Charmed reboot, portraying the powerful demon and businessman Alastair Caine. From 2021 to 2024, Parker joined the recurring cast of the Freeform drama series Good Trouble, portraying Yuri Elwin, a prominent, self-centered artist.

In 2025, he guest-starred as Jesse, the former police partner and old flame of Lucy Lawless’s character Alexa Crowe, in the two-part fifth season finale of the mystery series My Life Is Murder. The following year, he co-starred as Ethan alongside Sean Astin in the political thriller film A Social Contract.

== Personal life ==
Parker was educated at Glenfield College on Auckland's North Shore and attended Northland Youth Theatre in Whangārei.

Parker has been based in Los Angeles, California, since 2012. On 6 April 2023, he announced that he had become a naturalized American citizen.

== Filmography ==
=== Film ===
Year	Title	Role	Notes
1998	A Soldier's Sweetheart	Soldier #1	
2001	No One Can Hear You	Henley	
2001	The Lord of the Rings: The Fellowship of the Ring	Haldir	
2002	The Lord of the Rings: The Two Towers	Haldir	
2003	The Lord of the Rings: The Return of the King	Gothmog / Guritz	Voice
2006	Weekend Lovers	Matt	
2009	Underworld: Rise of the Lycans	Sabas	
2026	A Social Contract	Ethan	

=== Television ===
Year	Title	Role	Notes
1989	Hotshotz	Nicholas Paget	Miniseries
1989–1990	Gloss	Justin Grieg	Recurring role (season 3), unknown episodes
1991	Gold: The World's Play	Stanley Smith	Television film
1992, 1993–1996, 2007–2008, 2020, 2023, 2024	Shortland Street	Guy Warner	Recurring role (1992) Main role (1993–1996, 2007–2008) Guest role (2020, 2023, 2024)
1993	The Tommyknockers	Student bartender	Miniseries
1996	City Life	Seth	2 episodes
1997	2 People	Host	Unknown episodes
1997	Xena: Warrior Princess	Prince Sarpedon	Episode: "For Him the Bell Tolls"
1998	Young Hercules	Lucius	2 episodes
1999	Xena: Warrior Princess	Cleades	Episode: "The Key to the Kingdom"
1999	A Twist in the Tale	Larry Sharpe	Episode: "A Crack in Time"
2001	Xena: Warrior Princess	Bellerophon	Episode: "To Helicon and Back"
2001–2004	Mercy Peak	Alistair Kingsley	Main role, 32 episodes Nominated — New Zealand Film and TV Award for Best Supporting Actor
2003	Power Rangers Ninja Storm	Blue Face	Voice role; episode: "Prelude to a Storm"
2003	Power Rangers Ninja Storm	Mad Magnet	Voice role; episode: "There's No "I" in Team"
2003	Power Rangers Ninja Storm	Motodrone	Recurring voice role, 8 episodes
2005	Power Rangers S.P.D.	Narrator	Voice role; episode: "Beginnings: Part 1"
2008–2010	Legend of the Seeker	Darken Rahl / Walter	Main role, 25 episodes Nominated — New Zealand Film and TV Award for Best Performance by a Supporting Actor
2009	Diplomatic Immunity	Leighton Mills	Main role, 13 episodes
2010	Radiradirah	Prince John, various voices	2 episodes
2010	Spartacus: Blood and Sand	Gaius Claudius Glaber	Recurring role, 3 episodes
2011	Waitangi: What Really Happened	James Stuart Freeman	Television film
2011	Auckland Daze	Craig / Self	Episode: "1.2"
2012	Spartacus: Vengeance	Gaius Claudius Glaber	Main role, 10 episodes
2012	Shackleton's Captain	Frank Worsley	Television film Nominated — New Zealand Film and TV Award for Best Performance by an Actor
2013	NCIS: Los Angeles	Vasile Comescu	Episode: "Reznikov, N."
2013	Sleepy Hollow	Colonel Banastre Tarleton	Episode: "The Sin Eater"
2014	NCIS	JAG Major Richard Huggins	Episode: "Shooter"
2014–2017	Reign	Stéphane Narcisse	Recurring role (season 2) Main role (seasons 3–4), 56 episodes
2018	Agents of S.H.I.E.L.D.	Taryan	2 episodes
2018–2019	Charmed	Alastair Caine	Recurring role (season 1), 11 episodes
2021–2024	Good Trouble	Yuri Elwin	Recurring role (seasons 3–5), 13 episodes
2025	My Life Is Murder	Jesse	2 episodes

== Theatre ==
Year	Title	Role	Notes
1987–1997	Theatre Sports		
1991	Macbeth	Malcolm	
1992	Weed	Hugh	
1994	The Seagull	Constantin	
1997	Arcadia	Valentine Coverly	
1998–99	Wind in the Willows	Mole	
1999	Amy's View	Dominic Tyghe	
2001	Rosencrantz and Guildenstern Are Dead	Rosencrantz	
2001	The Judas Kiss	Robert Ross	
2002–03	The Rocky Horror Show	Narrator	
2005	Serial Killers	Matt	
2006	Glide Time	John	
2007	The Pillowman	Katurian	
