= Go Girls =

New Zealand comedy-drama television series

- Genre: Comedy drama
- Created by: Rachel Lang; Gavin Strawhan
- Starring: Jay Ryan; Bronwyn Turei; Alix Bushnell; Anna Hutchison; Matt Whelan; Esther Stephens; George Mason; J.J. Fong; Leon Wadham; Shara Connolly; Tai Berdinner-Blades
- Narrated by: Jay Ryan (series 1–4); Matt Whelan (series 4); George Mason (series 5)
- Opening theme: "Piece of My Heart" by The Electric Confectionaires
- Composer: Jonathan Bree
- Country of origin: New Zealand
- Original language: English
- No. of series: 5
- No. of episodes: 65 (list of episodes)

Production
- Executive producers: John Barnett; Simon Bennett; Gavin Strawhan; Rachel Lang
- Producers: Chris Bailey; Britta Hawkins
- Cinematography: DJ Stipsen; Dave Cameron
- Editors: Nicola Smith; Tom Eagles; Mark Taylor; Lisa Hough; Jochen Fitzherbert; Brough Johnson
- Production company: South Pacific Pictures

Original release
- Network: TV2
- Release: 19 February 2009 – 16 July 2013

Go Girls is a New Zealand comedy-drama television series that centres on four adult friends, three female and one male, living on Auckland's North Shore. In the fifth season it was the same premise, but this time centred on five adult friends, three female and two male. Dissatisfied with their lives, they make challenging promises to each other that they endeavour to fulfil throughout the series.

== Episodes ==
Series	Episodes	Originally released	
Series	Episodes	First released	Last released
1	13	18 February 2009	14 May 2009
2	13	18 March 2010	17 June 2010
3	13	8 February 2011	3 May 2011
4	13	14 February 2012	8 May 2012
5	13	30 April 2013	16 July 2013

== Synopsis ==
Go Girls began airing in New Zealand in February 2009. In June 2012 after the show's fourth season proved another ratings winner for its channel, Go Girls was signed on for a fifth season that began screening the following year. With many of the show's core cast (including Jay Ryan and Anna Hutchison) having departed for other roles, the fifth season featured an entirely new cast but a similar theme.

The show was created by Rachel Lang, who co-created the popular Outrageous Fortune television series, and Gavin Strawhan (Burying Brian). The two are responsible for the writing of the show, along with Kate McDermott.

The first episode screened in Australia on 8 August 2009.

== Cast ==
=== Main ===
Actor/Actress	Character	Seasons				
Actor/Actress	Character	1	2	3	4	5
Jay Ryan	Kevin	Main	Main	Main	Main	
Bronwyn Turei	Cody Latimer	Main	Main	Main	Main	
Alix Bushnell	Britta McMann	Main	Main	Main	Main	
Anna Hutchison	Amy Smart	Main	Main	Main	Main	
Matt Whelan	Brad Caulfield	Recurring	Main	Main	Main	
Esther Stephens	Olivia Duff		Main	Main	Main	
George Mason	Ted Keegan					Main
J.J. Fong	Alice Lee					Main
Leon Wadham	Levi Hirsh					Main
Shara Connolly	Candace "Candy" Fleetwood Mac McMann	Guest			Guest	Main
Tai Berdinner-Blades	Bennie Keegan					Main

- Jay Ryan as Kevin (seasons 1–4)

Narrator of the show up until his departure half-way through season 4 and then again for the final few seconds of the original cast's run. He's also the father of Britta's baby, Hero, but doesn't know it. He and Britta slept together (while he was engaged to Amanda) when they both thought that Olivia was going to die and wanted to comfort each other. He ended up marrying Amanda in the last episode of season 3, but leaves her a year later after he realises that they weren't compatible. Gets nearly beaten to death by Amanda's dad and brothers and ends up in the hospital. While recovering, he "accidentally" has sex with Fran (she unknowingly ate pot laced muffins that amped up her sex drive and he was still partly in a body cast.) Amy forgives him though, since technically they weren't together at that point, and the two move forward with their relationship. Later gets offered a job as a mechanic for a rally car club when he helps out a man broken down on the side of the road. Initially doesn't want to take it because it involved being away for several months, but Amy encourages him to go and they begin a long-distance relationship. Tries to get back for Britta's wedding to Ross, but because of an airline strike, he doesn't make it in time but does eventually arrive to surprise Amy at the beach. Their kiss ends the show.

- Bronwyn Turei as Cody Latimer (seasons 1–4)

Mother of Possum. Manager/Owner Easy Tune auto repairs. Dating NSB/Nick.

- Alix Bushnell as Britta McMann (seasons 1–4)

Has an infant daughter named Hero. Owns The Party Fairy Company. Former barmaid and real estate agent. Married to Ross.

- Anna Hutchison as Amy Smart (seasons 1–2, 3–4)

Works at a law firm. Dating Kevin. Left during the beginning of Series 2 but returned at the end of Series 3.

- Matt Whelan as Brad Caulfield (seasons 1, 2–4)

Recurring season one. Starring season 2+. Amy's ex who then married Angelina, though the two have now separated. He then dated Britta before the two broke up and he headed overseas. Is now running a bar on the North Shore. Is still in love with Britta, and serves as Narrator for the Latter half of Series 4.

- Esther Stephens as Olivia Duff (seasons 2–4)

Runs a magazine with Leo. Married to Brad's brother Will.

- George Mason as Ted Keegan (season 5)

Narrator of Series 5, Replacing both Kevin and Brad, makes a quest to win the girl of his dreams.

- J.J. Fong as Alice Lee (season 5)

Determined not to be an Asian stereotype, Alice makes a quest to be bad.

- Leon Wadham as Levi Hirsh (season 5)

Levi makes a quest for pay back.

- Shara Connolly as Candace "Candy" Fleetwood Mac McMann (seasons 1, 4 and 5)

Britta's younger sister. Has a brief fling with Kevin in season 1. Returns for Britta's wedding to Ross in season 4. Now in season 5, after realising she has alienated everyone she makes a quest to be a nicer person.

- Tai Berdinner-Blades as Bennie Keegan (season 5)

Clumsy and unpractical, Bennie's quest to be her own boss.

=== Recurring cast ===
Actor	Character	Seasons	Notes
Ingrid Park	Fran McMann	1 - 5	Britta's mother. Partner of Jeffrey Duff.
Annie Whittle	Jan McMann	1 - 4	Britta's grandmother. Partner of Carol Duff.
Irene Wood	Nan McMann	1 - 5	Britta's great-grandmother.
Matariki Whatarau	Mitchell	5	A man known for his cheating and tendency towards using women. He was the unfaithful love interest of Benny, Ashleigh and Candy.
Deanna Chiang	Nancy Ping	5	Alice's aunt and birth mother.
Astra McLaren	Ashleigh	5	Candy's former best friend and ex-girlfriend of Mitchell.
Josh McKenzie	Kent	5	Levi's boyfriend and first love since high school.
Brittany Wakelin	Possum Latimer	1-4	Cody's daughter, currently living with her grandparents, Gwen & Wiri. Named after the NZ rally driver, the late Possum Bourne.
Michele Hine	Carol Duff	2-4	Olivia's mother. Partner of Jan McMann.
Leighton Cardno	Leo Browning	2-4	Friend of Olivia, whom he met when they attended university. In season 2 he was Olivia's boss at the fictional North Shore Chronicle newspaper while in season 3 Olivia became his boss. Ex-Boyfriend of Britta and acts as a father to her daughter.
Roy Snow	Nick/NSB	3-4	Cody's boyfriend.
Bronwyn Bradley	Gwen Latimer	1-4	Cody's mother. Suffers from early onset of Alzheimer's disease. Left at the end of season 3, returned part-way through season 4.
William Davis	Wiri Latimer	1-4	Cody's father. Left at the end of season 3, returned part-way through season 4.
Dan Musgrove	Rupert	4	Amy's colleague at the law firm who the gang call "Rupert The Perv". He especially dislikes Kevin as he was bullied by him at school.
Bruce Phillips	Ron Cape	4	Runs a car rally team and offers Kevin a job as a mechanic. Always needs to pee.
Jon Brazier	Brendan	3-4	Amy's boss at the law firm where she works.
Arthur Meek	Will Caulfield	4	Brad's 'older and better' brother. Has a drug addiction. Had a fling with Olivia only to later marry her in the season four finale. Goes to rehab.
Chris Widdup	Ross McCormack	2-4	Amy's bank manager who dated Britta once. Marries Britta in the season four finale.
John Tui	Timbo	1-4	Senior mechanic at Easytune.
Elliott McKee	Jesse	3	Works at EasyTune. Has a crush on Cody.
Jacqui Nauman	Mia	2-3	Had a one night fling with Brad and when she became pregnant she thought the child was Brad's.
Kyle Pryor	Shane	3	Kevins long lost cousin.
Simon Prast	Jeffrey Duff	2-3	Olivia's father. A doctor at the North Shore Hospital. Dumped wife Carol to be with Britta's mother, Fran. Died of a heart attack during the one-year gap between series 3 and 4
Johnny Barker	Joel	3-4	A musician. Olivia's ex-fiancé
Zoe Cramond	Amanda	2-4	Kevin's ex-wife. They separate at the beginning of series 4. Used to go to school with Kevin, Amy, Britta, Cody and Olivia.
Tania Nolan	Angelina Caulfield	1-3	A classmate and Amy's arch-rival who married Amy's ex, Brad Caulfield. Later had a fling with Kevin after divorcing Brad.
Joseph Naufahu	Eli Fa'asalele	1–2, 4	Cody's ex-husband and rugby player for the North Shore Giants. Reappears in season four, after finally coming out of the closet.
Stephen Lovatt	Larry Smart	1-2	Amy, Scott and Possum's father, married to Alison.
Theresa Healey	Alison Smart	1–2, 4	Amy and Scott's mother, married to Larry. Has an affair with Brendan in Season 4.
Neill Rea	Dave	3-4	Amanda's father. After Kevin leaves Amanda he and his friends brutally assault Kevin
Jared Turner	Ben Maddox	1-2	Cody's former boyfriend and Possum's former teacher. He got involved with Cody, despite already being married to Helen (Sarah Somerville)
Ari Boyland	Scott Smart	1-2	Amy's brother and Possum's half-brother.
Gareth Reeves	Philippe	1-2	Eli's boyfriend. Is devastated when Eli dumps him to marry Cody. They however get back together once the marriage is over.
Blair Strang	Joseph Little	1-2	An actor Britta met in season one while she was an extra filming The Epic Tales of Zoltar. He later got his own spin-off series. The two are later engaged for a short time in season 2.
Monique Bree	Kirby	1-2	One of the W.A.G.s (Wives and Girlfriends), of the rugby team, married to Zave (Te Kohe Tuhaka). Has an affair with Kevin in season 2.
Greg Johnson	Flinty	2	Eli's publicist who causes trouble for Cody.
Brooke Williams	Wanda	1	Barmaid at 'The Taka' who was involved with Kevin
Dean O'Gorman	Marco	1	Britta's playboy ex.
Lynette Forday	Antonia Li	1	A reality show producer who was Amy's boss. Has a son, Gabriel (Caleb Griffiths) who Britta babysat.
Roy Ward	Don Parkin	1	Fran's deceased second husband who was briefly thought to be Britta's father.

== Production ==
Exterior shots of characters' homes are located in Mairangi Bay, Takapuna, Narrow Neck and Cheltenham Beach, North Shore respectively. The interior shots of the homes are constructed completely inside South Pacific Pictures' studio facilities on the North Shore.

The workshop 'Ezytune', where the characters Cody and Kevin work, is actually a Midas workshop located on Wairau Road in Glenfield, North Shore City. The show's producers acquire use of the workshop and simply place an 'Ezytune' sign over the existing Midas lettering during filming.

The bar frequented by the characters, 'The Taka', is a completely fictitious premises and was constructed within a studio. An enlarged photograph of the Hauraki Gulf, with volcano Rangitoto Island in the background, is used as the backdrop outside of the windows of the bar, this can be noticed in some scenes filmed on the bar's decking area.

== Music ==
Continuing with co-producer Lang's theme throughout Outrageous Fortune of using only New Zealand music within the series, Go Girls features an array of New Zealand bands and artists. The opening theme to the show "Piece of my Heart" by The Electric Confectionaires, was fittingly chosen as the band originate from the North Shore area.

As well as an eclectic mix of New Zealand songs throughout the season's episodes, a few set artists and songs were chosen to represent the show. The set score of the show most notably consists of music by three specific artists. Used in almost every episode to set mood, is music taken mostly from the New Zealand band, The Brunettes 2002 debut album, Holding Hands, Feeding Ducks. At least one song from this album can be found in every one of the 13 episodes of season one. A cover of the song "End of the Runway" from the album is sung by actress Alix Bushnell, who plays Britta McMann, in the final episode during characters Cody and Eli's wedding dance.

Another artist from the North Shore, Lydia Cole, features often with her song "Come With'", from her 2008 album Twenty Years.

The Electric Confectionaires song "Mr Whippy" is also used within the show.

== Reviews ==
The show received mostly positive reviews upon airing.

The New Zealand Herald reviewer said about Go Girls: "It has not only restored my faith in television and womankind, but it made me laugh out loud in the process" and another reviewer from the same paper said "It looks good for a laugh provided by a set of appealing Shore girl characters.". The Sunday Star Times said "It's the scripts that make it - more productions of this calibre please"

However, not all reviews were positive with a reviewer for the Dominion Post newspaper saying Go Girls had "Bad overacting, no direction, lame dialogue and characters that don't ring true [has made for a] truly tedious hour of viewing".

== Cancelled American adaptation ==
In October 2009 it was announced Go Girls would be adapted for U.S television by ABC. Liz Tuccillo, a writer on Sex and the City and the book and film He's Just Not That Into You. In November 2010 it was reported that the series is currently being developed by writer named Michael Oates Palmer (Army Wives, Kyle XY). The American version will be a loose adaption described as being about "a single man and his three single female friends, all in their early-mid 30s, trying to make relationships work in a major American city while all their other college friends are off starting families", it was however cancelled around 2012, likely due to the failure of the American remake of the Inbetweeners.
