= 20/20 (New Zealand TV programme) =

- Starring: Carolyn Robinson; Susie Nordqvist
- Country of origin: New Zealand

Original release
- Network: TV3 (1993–2003); TVNZ 2 (2005–2014); TVNZ 1 (2016-present)
- Release: 3 January 1993 – 2016

20/20 is a New Zealand documentary television programme hosted by Carolyn Robinson, and is based on the American Broadcasting Company programme of the same name.

Between 1993 and 2014, the show contained a mix of locally produced and American content. The show now presents stories largely produced by its American counterpart, with a local presenter providing context at the beginning. The show uses the same graphics and theme music as the American version.

From 1993 until 2003, the show was broadcast on TV3 (now Three), and was hosted by Louise Wallace. The format was then picked up by TVNZ, and was hosted on TVNZ 2 first by Miriama Kamo until 2011, then by Sonya Wilson until 2014. In its latest iteration, the show is presented by Carolyn Robinson, and has been broadcast on TVNZ 1 since 2016. Producer Susie Nordqvist is the show's back-up presenter.
