= New Zealand film and television awards =

New Zealand award

- Logo for the current New Zealand Screen Awards
- Awarded for: Excellence in New Zealand film and television
- Country: New Zealand
- First award: 1964
- Website: nzscreenawards.co.nz

New Zealand film and television awards have gone by many different names and have been organised by different industry groups.

As of 2025, a combined New Zealand Screen Awards recognises content created for theatrical release alongside programmes produced for broadcast, streaming and digital platforms.

== History ==
=== Early years ===
The first New Zealand television awards were the National TV Awards, which ran from 1964 to 1965, organised by the New Zealand Television Workshop. The trophy was designed by noted sculptor Greer Twiss.

From 1970 to 1985, the New Zealand Feltex Awards honoured New Zealand television, sponsored by carpet manufacturer Feltex.

=== GOFTA Awards ===
The Feltex Awards were superseded by annual awards organised by the Guild of Film and Television Arts (GOFTA). The awards ran from 1986 to 2003 and were known by a number of different titles, including the GOFTA Awards. The awards were run as joint film and television awards until 2000 when they were split into two separate ceremonies.

The 1987 GOFTA Awards, presented by American TV personality Leeza Gibbons and New Zealand radio host Nic Nolan, is known for its disastrous presentation, including a disruptive audience who heckled guest John Inman, and confusing stage management.

In 1998 the Academy of Film and Television Arts was established by a collection of national guilds including The Techos' Guild, SPADA, WIFT, the Writers Guild and Nga Aho Whakaari. The AFTAs were held in 1999, 2000, 2001 and 2003, sponsored by Nokia.

=== Qantas Television Awards and New Zealand Screen Awards ===
In 2005, the Qantas Television Awards (honouring television and television journalism) and the New Zealand Screen Awards (honouring film and television) were founded as the new award presentations. The Qantas Television Awards were run by the New Zealand Television Broadcasters Council (now known as ThinkTV). These awards celebrated television productions and also incorporated the television media categories that had previously been part of the Qantas Media Awards. The New Zealand Screen Awards were run by the Screen Directors Guild of New Zealand and celebrated both film and television productions, including some overlap with Qantas Television Awards categories.

In 2008 the Qantas Television Awards merged with the New Zealand Screen Awards. From 2008 to 2011, the NZTBC and the SDGNZ jointly ran the Qantas Film and Television Awards. These awards were renamed the Aotearoa Film and Television Awards (abbreviated to AFTA) in 2011.

=== New Zealand Television Awards and Rialto Channel New Zealand Film Awards ===
In 2012 the Screen Directors Guild of New Zealand announced that due to funding and resource restraints it would not be involved with the 2012 AFTAs and would not organise an alternate film industry awards that year.

ThinkTV renamed the new television-focused awards the New Zealand Television Awards for 2012. However, in early 2013, ThinkTV announced that it would no longer hold the New Zealand Television Awards, after partner TVNZ decided not to support the awards. This left New Zealand without an annual television award.

Later in 2012, an alternative film awards presentation was announced, independent of the SDGNZ. The Sorta Unofficial New Zealand Film Awards - also known as the Moas - were organised by film industry figure Ant Timpson and nzherald.co.nz online entertainment editor Hugh Sundae. In 2013 the Moas were renamed the Rialto Channel New Zealand Film Awards. As there were no television awards in 2013, the 2013 Moas had one television award, honouring Best Television Feature or Drama Series.

In addition to sponsoring the Best Score and Best Sound categories at the New Zealand Film Awards since 2013, in 2014 the Australasian Performing Right Association (APRA) introduced two film music awards to its annual Silver Scroll Awards: APRA Best Original Music in a Feature Film Award and APRA Best Original Music in a Series Award.

=== New Zealand Television Awards and New Zealand Film Awards ===
The New Zealand Film Awards were not held in 2015 or 2016, with organisers saying a lack of films released that year made it hard to justify holding the awards. The Moas were held for the fourth time in February 2017, covering the period of October 2014 to November 2016.

The New Zealand Television Awards were revived in 2017 by an independent group of television industry people. As the awards were last held in 2013, the 2017 eligibility period ranged from 1 June 2015 to 30 June 2017. The awards took place on 30 November 2017.

=== New Zealand Screen Awards ===
In 2025 the awards combined and rebranded as the New Zealand Screen Awards, to recognise content created for theatrical release alongside programmes produced for television broadcast, streaming services and digital platforms.

== Award categories ==
The New Zealand Screen Awards include categories for both film and television. The awards also include the discretionary NZSA Screen Legend Award, recognising a significant contribution to the New Zealand screen industry.

=== Film ===
Film awards are presented for productions, directing, performances and technical achievements. Current categories include:

Area	Categories
Productions	Best Feature Film; Best Short Film; Best Documentary Feature
Directing	Best Director: Documentary Feature; Best Director: Drama Feature
Performance	Best Performance by an Actor in a Female Role: Feature; Best Performance by a Supporting Actor in a Female Role: Feature; Best Performance by an Actor in a Male Role: Feature; Best Performance by a Supporting Actor in a Male Role: Feature
Craft	Best Editing: Documentary / Factual: Feature; Best Editing: Drama: Feature; Best Camerawork: Documentary / Factual: Feature; Best Cinematography: Feature; Best Sound: Feature; Best Original Score: Feature; Best Picture Finishing: Feature; Best Production Design: Feature; Best Costume Design: Feature; Best Makeup Design: Feature; Best Script: Feature

=== Television ===
Television awards cover programmes and series, directing, performance, presenting and technical achievements.

Area	Categories
Programmes	Best Drama Series; Best Comedy Programme; Best Factual Series; Best Documentary: Series; Best Reality Series; Best Current Affairs Programme; Best Children's Programme; Best Māori Programme; Best Reo Māori Programme; Best Pasifika Programme; Best News Coverage; Best Sports Programme; Best Live Event Coverage; Best Entertainment Programme
Directing	Best Director: Documentary/Factual Series; Best Director: Drama Series; Best Director: Multi Camera
Performance	Best Performance by an Actor in a Female Role: Series; Best Performance by a Supporting Actor in a Female Role: Series; Best Performance by an Actor in a Male Role: Series; Best Performance by a Supporting Actor in a Male Role: Series
Presenting and reporting	Reporter of the Year; Best Presenter: Entertainment; Best Presenter: News and Current Affairs
Craft	Best Editing: Documentary / Factual: Series; Best Editing: Drama: Series; Best Camerawork: Documentary / Factual: Series; Best Cinematography: Series; Best Sound: Series; Best Original Score: Series; Best Picture Finishing: Series; Best Production Design: Series; Best Costume Design: Series; Best Makeup Design: Series; Best Script: Series

=== Other awards ===
Screen Personality of the Year applies to both film and television. Finalists are selected by the New Zealand Screen Awards committee rather than through entries.

The NZSA Screen Legend Award is a discretionary award recognising a film or television professional, programme or organisation that has made a significant contribution to the New Zealand screen industry.

== Awards ==
Year	Television	Film
1964	1964 New Zealand Television Workshop National TV Awards	No film awards
1965	1965 New Zealand Television Workshop National TV Awards	No film awards
1966	No television awards	No film awards
1967	No television awards	No film awards
1969	No television awards	No film awards
1970	1970 New Zealand Feltex Awards	No film awards
1971	1971 New Zealand Feltex Awards	No film awards
1972	1972 New Zealand Feltex Awards	No film awards
1973	1973 New Zealand Feltex Awards	No film awards
1974	1974 New Zealand Feltex Awards	No film awards
1975	1975 New Zealand Feltex Awards	No film awards
1976	1976 New Zealand Feltex Awards	No film awards
1977	1977 New Zealand Feltex Awards	No film awards
1978	1978 New Zealand Feltex Awards	No film awards
1979	1979 New Zealand Feltex Awards	No film awards
1980	1980 New Zealand Feltex Awards	No film awards
1981	1981 New Zealand Feltex Awards	No film awards
1982	1982 New Zealand Feltex Awards	No film awards
1983	1983 New Zealand Feltex Awards	No film awards
1984	1984 New Zealand Feltex Awards	No film awards
1985	1985 New Zealand Feltex Awards	No film awards
1986	1986 Listener Gofta Awards	
1987	1987 Listener Gofta Awards	
1988	1988 Listener Film and Television Awards	
1989	1989 Listener Film and Television Awards	
1990	No television awards	1990 NZ Film Awards
1991	No television awards	1991 NZ Film Awards
1992	No television awards	No film awards
1993	1993 Film & TV Awards	
1994	1994 TV Guide Film & Television Awards	
1995	1995 TV Guide Film & Television Awards	
1996	1996 TV Guide Film & Television Awards of New Zealand	
1997	1997 TV Guide Film & Television Awards of New Zealand	
1998	1998 TV Guide Television Awards	No film awards
1999	1999 TV Guide Television Awards	1999 Nokia New Zealand Film Awards
2000	2000 TV Guide Television Awards	2000 Nokia New Zealand Film Awards
2001	No television awards	2001 Nokia New Zealand Film Awards
2002	2002 TV Guide NZ Television Awards	No film awards
2003	2003 New Zealand Television Awards	2003 New Zealand Film Awards
2004	No television awards	No film awards
2005	2005 Qantas Television Awards	2005 New Zealand Screen Awards (Note: The 2005 New Zealand Screen Awards, the 2006 Air New Zealand Screen Awards and the 2007 Air New Zealand Screen Awards included both film and television categories. "New Zealand Screen Awards 2005". On Film.)
2006	2006 Qantas Television Awards	2006 Air New Zealand Screen Awards
2007	2007 Qantas Television Awards	2007 Air New Zealand Screen Awards
2008	2008 Qantas Film and Television Awards	
2009	2009 Qantas Film and Television Awards	
2010	2010 Qantas Film and Television Awards	
2011	2011 Aotearoa Film & Television Awards	
2012	2012 New Zealand Television Awards	2012 Sorta Unofficial New Zealand Film Awards
2013	No television awards	2013 Rialto Channel New Zealand Film Awards (Note: The Rialto Channel New Zealand Film Awards includes one television award, in addition to the film awards."Frequently Asked Questions". NZ Film Awards.)
2014	No television awards	2014 Rialto Channel New Zealand Film Awards
2015	No television awards	No film awards
2016	No television awards	No film awards
2017	2017 New Zealand Television Awards	2017 Rialto Channel New Zealand Film Awards
2018	2018 New Zealand Television Awards	No film awards
2019	2019 New Zealand Television Awards	No film awards
2020	2020 New Zealand Television Awards	No film awards
2021	2021 New Zealand Television Awards	No film awards
2022	2022 New Zealand Television Awards	No film awards
2023	2023 New Zealand Television Awards	No film awards
2024	2024 New Zealand Television Awards	No film awards
2025	2025 New Zealand Screen Awards	
2026	2026 New Zealand Screen Awards	

== See also ==
- List of television awards
