= Andrew Shaw =

Andrew Shaw may refer to:

- Andrew Shaw (businessman), president and CEO of the Toronto Symphony Orchestra
- Andrew Shaw (golfer) (1898–1983), former professional golfer
- Andrew Shaw (ice hockey) (born 1991), Canadian ice hockey player
- Andrew Shaw (television executive), New Zealand television executive, broadcaster and former presenter
- Andrew Shaw (rugby union) (born 1989), Australian actor and former rugby player

== See also ==
- Andrew Shore (born 1952), singer
