= 2007 Air New Zealand Screen Awards =

- Awarded for: Excellence in New Zealand film and television
- Sponsored by: Air New Zealand
- Date: 1 August 2007
- Location: SkyCity Theatre, Auckland
- Country: New Zealand
- Presented by: Screen Directors Guild of New Zealand
- First award: 2005
- Final award: 2007

The 2007 Air New Zealand Screen Awards were held on Wednesday 1 August 2007 at SkyCity Theatre in Auckland, New Zealand. It was to be the final stand-alone NZ Screen Awards, as in 2008 the awards merged with the Qantas Television Awards and became the Qantas Film and Television Awards.

Unlike previous years, the 2007 awards did not include a section for feature films, as the New Zealand Screen Director's Guild felt there had not been enough feature films released to "warrant a robust competition". Films produced in the 2007 eligibility period would be eligible for entry in the 2008 awards.

== Nominees and winners ==
There were 24 television categories (a decrease of six on 2006), two digital feature categories, four short film categories and no feature film categories.

=== Television ===
Best Drama Programme

- Karaoke High (eps 1 & 9), Debra Kelleher
  - Outrageous Fortune (eps 7 & 16), South Pacific Pictures
  - Shortland Street (eps 3599 & 3642), South Pacific Pictures

Best Comedy Programme

- bro'Town (ep 3.2), Elizabeth Mitchell
  - Moon TV (series 3, ep 1), Leigh Hart
  - Wayne Anderson – Singer of Songs (ep 3), Glenn Elliott, Julia Parnell, Orlando Stewart, Jason Pengelly

Best Documentary

- Love, Speed and Loss, Visionary Film & TV
  - Touch Wood, Production Line
  - Try Revolution, Leanne Pooley

Best Factual Series

- Hunger for the Wild (eps 2 & 3), Peter Young, Tracy Roe
  - Emergency (eps 2 & 7), Jenny Williams
  - Hidden in the Numbers (eps 1 & 3), Mark McNeill, Dianne Lindesay

Best Mäori Language Programme

- Waka Huia (Te Tau Whakamahara I a Tumatauenga), TVNZ
  - Korero Ki Nga Kararehe (ep 5: Makimaki), Robert Pouwhare
  - Waka Huia (Korowai o Te Aroha, part 3), TVNZ

Best Children's Programme

- Maddigan's Quest (ep 8), South Pacific Pictures
  - Let's Get Inventin' (ep 1: Rocket Skates), Neil Stichbury, Luke Nola
  - The Killian Curse (series 1), Thomas Robins, Debra Kelleher

Best Lifestyle/Entertainment Programme

- Dancing with the Stars (series 2, ep 8), Debra Kelleher
  - Marae DIY, Screentime/Hula Haka Productions
  - The Living Room (series 3, ep 10), Mark Albiston, Sticky Pictures

Best Event Broadcast

- Na Ratou Mo Tatou – They Did It For Us, Screentime/Mäori Television
  - Te Arikinui Dame Te Atairangikaahu – 1931–2006, Derek Te Kotuku Wooster
  - Vodafone X-Air 2006 Post Event Shows (ep 3), Warren Green, Jason Naran, Sticky Pictures

Best Sports Programme

- Code (ep 32), Code/Mäori Television
  - IRB Sevens World Series – Wellington, Stu Dennison, TVNZ Sport
  - The Chosen Ones (ep 2: John Walker), Martin Crowe, Ian John

Best Reality Series

- Henderson To Hollywood (eps 8 & 9), Ondrej Havas
  - Piha Rescue (series 3, ep 1), Eric Derks
  - Tough Act (eps 1 & 5), Gibson Group

Performance by an Actress

- Robyn Malcolm, Outrageous Fortune (ep 16)
  - Amanda Billing, Shortland Street (ep 3642)
  - Rose McIver, Maddigan's Quest (ep 2)

Performance by a Supporting Actress

- Anna Jullienne, Shortland Street (ep 3566)
  - Siobhan Marshall, Outrageous Fortune (ep 13)
  - Antonia Prebble, Outrageous Fortune (ep 14)

Performance by an Actor

- Antony Starr, Outrageous Fortune (ep 7)
  - Grant Bowler, Outrageous Fortune (ep 7)
  - Jordan Metcalfe, Maddigan's Quest (ep 12)

Performance by a Supporting Actor

- Frank Whitten, Outrageous Fortune (ep 13)
  - Tammy Davis, Outrageous Fortune (ep 12)
  - Will Wallace, Orange Roughies (ep 1)

Presenter, Entertainment/Factual

- Jason Gunn, Dancing with the Stars (series 2, ep 8)
  - Joel Defries, Vodafone Select Live (ep 122)
  - Te Radar, Hidden in the Numbers (ep 1)

Script, Drama

- James Griffin, Outrageous Fortune (Christmas special)
  - Rachel Lang, Maddigan's Quest (ep 5)
  - Rachel Lang, Outrageous Fortune (ep 16)

Achievement in Directing, Drama/Comedy Programme

- Simon Bennett, Outrageous Fortune (ep 16)
  - Mark Beesley, Outrageous Fortune (ep 11)
  - Michael Bennett, Outrageous Fortune (series 2, ep 7)

Achievement in Directing, Documentary

- Justin Pemberton, Love, Speed and Loss
  - Mark Albiston, Artsville (ep 1: The Magical Word of Misery)
  - James Frankham, Pacific Solution

Achievement in Directing, Factual Programming/Entertainment

- Rupert MacKenzie, Hidden in the Numbers (ep 2)
  - Mark Albiston, The Living Room (series 3, ep 10)
  - Peter Young, Hunger for the Wild

Achievement in Camerawork, Documentary

- Peter Young, Country Calendar (ep 22: Cray Coast)
  - James Ellis, Waka Reo (series 2)
  - Simon Raby, Elgar's Enigma: Biography of a Concerto

Achievement in Editing Documentary

- Bryan Shaw, Love, Speed and Loss
  - John Fraser, Hidden In The Numbers (ep 3)
  - Tim Woodhouse, Try Revolution

Achievement in Original Music

- Victoria Kelly, Maddigan's Quest (ep 5)
  - Joel Haines, Outrageous Fortune (ep 8)
  - Dianne Swann, Brett Adams – The Bads, Hunger for the Wild

Contribution to a Soundtrack

- Carl Smith, Rodney Larsen, Steve Finnigan, Maddigan's Quest (ep 2)
  - Carl Smith, Steve Finnigan, Outrageous Fortune (ep 8)
  - Beth Tredray, Hunger for the Wild

Contribution to Design

- Tracey Collins, Maddigan's Quest (ep 1)
  - Albedo VFX, Maddigan's Quest (ep 13)
  - Katrina Hodge, Outrageous Fortune (ep 8)

=== Digital Feature ===
Best Digital Feature

- The Waimate Conspiracy, Stefen Lewis
  - The Devil Dared Me To, Chris Stapp, Matt Heath, Karl Zohrab
  - You Move You Die, Ketzal Sterling

Technical Contribution to a Digital Feature

- Duncan Cole, The Last Magic Show
  - Rhys Duncan, You Move You Die
  - Georgie Hill, The Last Magic Show

=== Short film ===
Best Short Film

- Run, Mark Albiston
  - Fog, Rachel Gardner, Peter Salmon
  - Hawaikii, Michael Jonathan

Performance in a Short Film

- Chelsie Preston Crayford, Fog
  - Tyrrell Samia, Run
  - Helayna Seiuli, Run

Script for a Short Film

- Louis Sutherland, Run
  - Miki Magasiva, Uso Brother
  - Fiona Samuel, The Garden of Love

Technical Contribution to a Short Film

- John Harding, The King Boys
  - Simon Baumfield, Run
  - Ginny Loane, Fog
