= 2018 New Zealand Television Awards =

- Awarded for: Excellence in New Zealand television
- Date: 22 November 2018
- Location: Auckland
- Country: New Zealand
- Hosted by: Oliver Driver

The Huawei Mate20 New Zealand Television Awards for 2018 were held on 22 November 2018 at Civic Theatre in Auckland, New Zealand. The event was hosted by Oliver Driver.

== Nominees and winners ==
Winners are listed first and highlighted in boldface.

Key
† – Non-technical award
‡ – Technical award

=== Television ===
NZ On Air Best Drama Series†	Images & Sound Best Feature Drama†
**Westside S3 – Mark Beesley, Chris Bailey, Kelly Martin, James Griffin (South Pacific Pictures, Three)**; Wanted S2 – Richard Bell, Chloe Smith, Tony Ayres (Matchbox Pictures, Three); Cleverman – Rosemary Blight, Ryan Griffen, Sharon Lark, Jane Allen (Pukeko Pictures, TVNZ On Demand/Duke)	**The Dance Exponents – Why Does Love? – Carmen J Leonard (Great Southern Film & Television, TVNZ 1)**; Catching the Black Widow – Thomas Robins, David Stubbs (KHF Media, TVNZ 1); Resolve – Philly de Lacey (Screentime NZ Ltd, TVNZ 1)
NZ On Air Best Factual Series†	NZ On Air Best Documentary†
**Coast New Zealand – Anna Lynch (Great Southern Film & Television, TVNZ 1)**; Grand Designs New Zealand – Megan Jones, Robyn Paterson (Imagination Television Ltd, Three); I Am… – Philly de Lacey, Tina McLaren (Screentime NZ Ltd, TVNZ 1)	**NZ Wars - The Stories of Ruapekapeka – Adrian Stevanon, Mihingarangi Forbes, Carmen J Leonard, Colin McCrae, Annabelle Lee (Great Southern Film & Television, RNZ)**; Stan – Arwen O'Connor (Ruckus, Three); The Valley – Eugene Bingham, Phil Johnson, Toby Longbottom, Paula Penfold, Jon Stephenson (Stuff)
Best Original Reality Series†	Stage & Screen Best Format Reality Series†
**The Casketeers – Anna Lynch, Susan Leonard (Great Southern Film & Television, TVNZ 1)**; The Big Ward S2 – Wendy Tetley, Tash Christie (Greenstone TV, TVNZ 1); Lost & Found – David Lomas, Sue Woodfield, Angela Mann (Three)	**My Kitchen Rules NZ S3 – Simon Fleming (Seven Productions NZ Ltd, TVNZ 1)**; Dancing with the Stars NZ – Hayley Cunningham, John McDonald, Charlotte Hobson (Three); Married at First Sight NZ – Emma White, Greg Heathcote, Amanda Pain (Three); The Block NZ S6 – Aaron Dolbel, Emma White, Greg Heathcote, Sue Woodfield, Angela Mann (Three)
Best Lifestyle Programme†	Best Current Affairs Programme†
**Topp Country S3 – Arani Cuthbert (Diva Productions, TVNZ 1)**; Karena and Kasey's Kitchen Diplomacy S2 – Nicola Smith, Shelley Quinn, Vaughan Bayer (Imagination Television Ltd, TVNZ 1); Mind Over Money S2 – Samantha Blackley (Ruckus, TVNZ 1)	**Stuff Circuit – Eugene Bingham, Phil Johnson, Toby Longbottom, Paula Penfold (Stuff)**; The Hui – Annabelle Lee (Great Southern Film & Television, Three); Taken by the State – Melanie Reid (Newsroom.co.nz)
NZ On Air Best Web Series†	Best Children’s Programme†
**Baby Mama's Club – Hanelle Harris, Mia Teirney Henry (Culture Factory, TVNZ On Demand)**; Friday Night Bites – Roseanne Liang, Ally Xue, JJ Fong, Perlina Lau, Maha Albadrawi, Rachel Fawcett (Flat3 Productions Ltd, TVNZ On Demand); Lucy Lewis Can't Lose S2 – Amanda Alison & Paul Yates (Redletter TV, ThreeNow); Alice Snedden's Bad News – Alice Snedden, Leon Wadham, Sarah Zwart (TVNZ, TVNZ on Demand)	**Thunderbirds Are Go – Richard Taylor, Stuart McAra, Sharon Lark, Estelle Hughes, Giles Ridge (Pukeko Pictures & ITV Studios, TVNZ On Demand)**; The New Legends of Monkey – Rachel Gardner, Jamie Laurenson, Hakan Kousetta, Emile Sherman, Iain Canning, Robin Scholes (See-Saw Films, TVNZ 2); What Now – Janine Morrell-Gunn, Meg Huston, Morgan Williams (WhitebaitMedia, TVNZ 2)
Te Māngai Pāho Best Maori Programme†	Te Māngai Pāho Best Reo Programme†
**NZ Wars - The Stories of Ruapekapeka – Adrian Stevanon, Mihingarangi Forbes, Carmen J Leonard, Colin McCrae, Annabelle Lee (Great Southern Film & Television, RNZ)**; The Casketeers – Anna Lynch, Susan Leonard (Great Southern Film & Television, TVNZ 1); Ahikāroa – Quinton Hita, Karen Te-Ō-Kahurangi Waaka-Tibble, Nicola Smith, Rachel Jean (Kura Productions Ltd, Māori Television)	**Waka Huia – Timoti Karetu – Ngahuia Wade, Megan Douglas (Scottie Productions, TVNZ 1)**; Whaikōrero – Mahanga Pihama & Viv Wigby-Ngatai (Enter The Dragon Ltd, Māori Television); Te Karere – Arana Taumata (TVNZ)
Best Pasifika Programme†	Best News Coverage†
**Tales Of Time – Coconet TV – Tuki Laumea, Lisa Taouma (Tikilounge Productions)**; Fresh 2018 – Danny Aumua, Mario Faumui, Elizabeth Koroi, Oliver Coddington (Tikilounge Productions, TVNZ 2); Weaving Rainbows – Coconet TV – Elizabeth Koroi, Twayne Laumua (Tikilounge Productions)	**1 News – Tati Urale (TVNZ)**; Te Kāea – Lynette Amoroa, Maramena Roderick (Māori Television); Newshub – Newshub: Ardern Comes, Turei Goes (Three)
Monstavision Best Sports Programme†	Best Live Event Coverage†
**No Regrets – Bevan Sanson, Brian Hitchcock, Dave Earl, Nick Quail, Carl Matthews, Howard Dunn (Sky Network Television)**; Race for Motutapu – Alex Lewis, Mark Richardson, Eddy Fifield, Angela Mann (Alex Lewis Productions (ALP), Three); McKayson NZ Women's Open Countdown – Tim Evans, Kerry Russell, Phil Tataurangi, Joris Bolyn, Brian Hitchcock (Sky Network Television)	**ANZAC Dawn Service 2018 – Wayne Leonard, Brendon Butt (Māori Television)**; Election Aotearoa Māori Seats Debate – Carmen Parahi, Maramena Roderick (Māori Television); Vodafone New Zealand Music Awards 2017 – John McDonald, Charlotte Hobson, janda (Three)
Best Comedy/Comedy Entertainment Programme†	Best Director: Documentary/Factual†
**Jono & Ben – Bronwynn Bakker (Three)**; Funny Girls – Bronwynn Bakker (Three); High Road – Shannon Cairns (Tomorrowland Television Ltd, Lightbox NZ)	**Felicity Morgan-Rhind – Topp Country S3 (Diva Productions, TVNZ 1)**; Peter Burger – Artefact (Greenstone TV, Māori Television); Mitchell Hawkes – Stan (Ruckus, Three); Toby Longbottom – The Valley (Stuff Circuit)
Screen Auckland Best Director: Drama†	Huawei Mate20 Best Actress†
**Peter Salmon – Wanted S2 (Matchbox Pictures, Three)**; Danny Mulheron – The Dance Exponents – Why Does Love? (Great Southern Film & Television, TVNZ 1); Michael Hurst – Westside S3 (South Pacific Pictures, Three)	**Antonia Prebble – Westside S3 (South Pacific Pictures, Three)**; Aidee Walker – Catching the Black Widow (KHF Media, TVNZ 1); Rebecca Gibney – Wanted S2 (Matchbox Pictures, Three)
Best Actor†	Reporter of the Year†
**Rick Donald – 800 Words S3 (South Pacific Pictures, TVNZ 1)**; Jordan Mooney – The Dance Exponents – Why Does Love? (Great Southern Film & Television, TVNZ 1); Mark Mitchinson – High Road (Tomorrowland Television Ltd, Lightbox NZ)	**Jehan Casinader – Sunday (TVNZ)**; Melanie Reid – Taken by the State and Hidden Cameras Reveal Milking Shed Beatings (Newsroom.co.nz); Paula Penfold – Stuff Circuit (Stuff)
Huawei Mate20 Best Presenter: Entertainment†	Best Presenter: News and Current Affairs†
**Anika Moa – Anika Moa: Unleashed S1 (Rogue Productions Ltd, Maori Television / TVNZ On Demand)**; Mihingarangi Forbes – NZ Wars - The Stories of Ruapekapeka (Great Southern Film & Television, RNZ); Chris Moller – Grand Designs New Zealand (Imagination Television Ltd, Three); Jono Pryor & Ben Boyce – Jono & Ben S7 (Three)	**Mike McRoberts – Newshub (Three)**; Mihingarangi Forbes – The Hui (Great Southern Film & Television, Three); Miriama Kamo – Marae (Pango Productions, TVNZ 1); Duncan Garner – The AM Show (Three)
Woman's Day Television Personality of the Year†	Legend Award†
**Hayley Holt – TVNZ Breakfast**	**Tini Molyneux**
Best Editing: Documentary/Factual‡	Best Editing: Drama‡
Margot Francis – Decades in Colour S2 (Greenstone TV, Prime); Dion Schmidt – Wilbur: The King in the Ring (Notable Pictures, Māori Television); Justin Hawkes – Stan (Ruckus, Three); Toby Longbottom – The Valley (Stuff Circuit)	Allanah Bazzard – The Dance Exponents – Why Does Love? (Great Southern Film & Television, TVNZ 1); Cushla Dillon, Paul Maxwell – Wanted S2 (Matchbox Pictures, Three); Eric De Beus – 800 Words S3 (South Pacific Pictures, TVNZ 1)
Huawei Mate20 Best Camerawork: Documentary/Factual‡	Best Director: Multi Camera‡
Peter Young – Hyundai Country Calendar (Fisheye Films, TVNZ 1); Bevan Crothers – Stan (Ruckus, Three); Phil Johnson – The Valley (Stuff Circuit); Clayton Carpinter & Richard Harling – Topp Country (Diva Productions, TVNZ 1)	Marcus Kennedy – HSBC Rugby Sevens World Series, Hamilton (Sky Network Television); Matt Quin – Rugby League World Cup: Samoa V Tonga (Sky Network Television); Mitchell Hawkes – Vodafone New Zealand Music Awards 2017 (Three and janda)
Best Cinematographer: Drama‡	Best Contribution to a Soundtrack‡
David Paul – The Dance Exponents - Why Does Love? (Great Southern Film & Television, TVNZ 1); Simon Raby – Wanted S2 (Matchbox Pictures, Three); DJ Stipsen – The New Legends of Monkey (See-Saw Films, TVNZ On Demand)	Tom Miskin, Steve Finnigan, Mike Bayliss, Alan Kidd – Images and Sound – The Dance Exponents – Why Does Love? (Great Southern Film & Television, TVNZ 1); Ben Sinclair, Steve Finnigan, Mike Bayliss, Chris Sinclair – Images and Sound – Wanted S2 (Matchbox Pictures, Three); Nick Buckton, Greg Junovich, Jordan Smith, Ryan Green – Native Audio – Cul De Sac S2, Ep 6 (Greenstone TV, TVNZ 2)
Images & Sound Best Original Score‡	Best Post Production Design‡
Samuel Scott, Conrad Wedde and Lukasz Buda Music by Moniker – Cleverman (Pukeko Pictures, TVNZ On Demand/TVNZ Duke); Peter Van Der Fluit – The New Legends of Monkey (See-Saw Films, TVNZ 2); Karl Steven – Resolve (Screentime, TVNZ 1)	Paul Lear (Colourist) - Images & Sound – NZ Wars - The Stories of Ruapekapeka (Great Southern Film & Television, RNZ); Paul Lear (Colourist) - Images & Sound – The Dance Exponents – Why Does Love? (Great Southern Television, TVNZ 1); Alana Cotton (Colourist) - Images and Sound – Wanted S2 (Matchbox Pictures, Three)
Best Art Direction or Production Design‡	Best Costume Design‡
Miro Harré – The Dance Exponents – Why Does Love? (Great Southern Film & Television, TVNZ 1); Clayton Ercolano – Westside S3 (South Pacific Pictures, Three); Brant Fraser – Wanted S2 (Matchbox Pictures, Three)	Sara Beale – Filthy Rich S2 (Filthy Productions, TVNZ 2); Katrina Hodge – The Dance Exponents – Why Does Love? (Great Southern Film & Television, TVNZ 1); Liz McGregor – The New Legends of Monkey (See-Saw Films, TVNZ 2)
Best Makeup Design‡	Huawei Mate20 Best Script: Comedy†
Deirdre Cowley – Filthy Rich S2 (Filthy Productions, TVNZ 2); Jacinta Driver – The Dance Exponents – Why Does Love? (Great Southern Film & Television, TVNZ 1); Susie Glass, Jacqueline Leung, Joe Whelan – The New Legends of Monkey (See-Saw Films, TVNZ 2)	Roseanne Liang – Friday Night Bites (Flat3 Productions Ltd, TVNZ On Demand); Alice Snedden – Funny Girls (Three); Ben Boyce, Jono Pryor, Alice Snedden – Jono & Ben S7 (Three)
Best Script: Drama†	
Pip Hall, Philip Smith – The Dance Exponents – Why Does Love? (Great Southern Film & Television, TVNZ 1); Kate McDermott – 800 Words S3 (South Pacific Pictures, TVNZ 1); James Griffin – Westside S3 (South Pacific Pictures, Three)	
