= Victoria Kelly =

Victoria Kelly name may refer to:

- Tori Kelly, American singer
- Victoria Kelly (New Zealand composer)
