= 2017 New Zealand Television Awards =

- Awarded for: Excellence in New Zealand television
- Date: 30 November 2017
- Location: Auckland
- Country: New Zealand
- Hosted by: Oliver Driver

The 2017 New Zealand Television Awards was held on 30 November 2017 at SkyCity Theatre in Auckland, New Zealand. The awards marked the revival of the awards after a five-year gap. The awards covered programmes first broadcast between 1 July 2015 and 30 June 2017. The event was hosted by Oliver Driver.

== Nominees and winners ==
Winners are listed first and highlighted in boldface.

Key
† – Non-technical award
‡ – Technical award

=== Television ===
New Zealand On Air Best Drama Series†	Images & Sound Best Feature Drama†
**800 Words 2 – Chris Bailey, Kelly Martin, James Griffin, John Holmes & Julie McGauran (South Pacific Pictures & Seven Productions, TVNZ1)**; Westside 2 – Mark Beesley, Kelly Martin, Chris Bailey & James Griffin (South Pacific Pictures, Three); Cleverman – Angela Littlejohn, Rosemary Blight, Ryan Griffen & Lauren Edwards (Pukeko Pictures & Goalpost Pictures, TVNZ On Demand / TVNZ Duke)	**Jean – Paula Boock & Donna Malane (Lippy Pictures, TVNZ1)**; Bombshell – Screentime NZ (TVNZ1); Belief: The Possession of Janet Moses – David Stubbs & Thomas Robins (KHF Media, TVNZ1)
New Zealand On Air Best Factual Series†	New Zealand On Air Best Documentary†
**Why Am I? – The Science of Us – Paul Casserly, Mark McNeill & Irena Dol (Razor Films, TVNZ1)**; Our Big Blue Backyard Series 2 – Judith Curran & Kina Scollay (NHNZ, TVNZ1); Great War Stories Series 4 – Anna Cottrell (AC Productions, Three); Te Radar’s Chequered Past – Alexander Behse (Monsoon Pictures International, TVNZ1); Forensics NZ – Belinda McLeod & Rachel Jean (South Pacific Pictures, Prime TV)	**Making Good Men – Te Amokura Productions (Prime TV)**; The Women of Pike River – Tash Christie, Alex Reed & Mary Durham (Greenstone TV, TVNZ1); Born This Way: Awa’s Story – Arwen O’Connor (Ruckus, TVNZ1)
Best Reality Series†	Best Lifestyle Programme†
**Songs from the Inside III Christchurch – Julian Arahanga & Michael Havas (Awa Films, Maori Television)**; Dare to Dream – Neil Stichbury, Patrick McAteer, Perry Bradley & Tim Sisarich (Film Construction, TVNZ1); Sidewalk Karaoke – Bailey Mackey & Jonathon Ulrich (Pango Productions, Maori Television)	**Karena & Kasey’s Kitchen Diplomacy – Darryl McEwen (Imagination Television, TVNZ1)**; Rachel Hunter’s Tour of Beauty – Bettina Hollings (Imagination Television, TVNZ1); Te Araroa: Tales From the Trails – Series 2 – Megan Douglas & Anna Marbrook (Scottie Productions, Maori Television)
Best Current Affairs Programme†	New Zealand On Air Best Web Series†
**The Politician, The Police and The Payout, 20 June 2017 – Melanie Reid, Mark Jennings, Paul Enticott & Tim Murphy (newsroom.co.nz)**; The Hui – Annabelle Lee, Adrian Stevanon & Mihingarangi Forbes (Great Southern Film and Television, Three); Private Business, Public Failure: Inside Our Prisons – Paula Penfold, Eugene Bingham, Toby Longbottom, Phil Johnson & Suyeon Son (stuff.co.nz)	**Loading Docs – Notable Pictures (loadingdocs.net, TVNZ On Demand, Vimeo)**; Amy Street – Viv Kernick, Kirsty Griffin & Gaylene Preston (Bella Pacific Media, amystreet.net / online); Friday Night Bites – Maha Albadrawi, Roseanne Liang, JJ Fong, Perlina Lau, Ally Xue & Kerry Warkia (Flat3 Productions, TVNZ On Demand / YouTube)
Planet Fun Best Children's Programme†	Te Māngai Pāho Best Māori Programme†
**Terry Teo – Luke Sharpe & Gerard Johnstone (Semi-Professional Pictures, TVNZ2)**; Nia’s Extra Ordinary Life 2 – Kerry Warkia, Kiel McNaughton & Jared Kahi (Brown Sugar Apple Grunt Productions, Maori Television); Smokefree Rockquest 2016 – Mikee Carpinter & Warren Green (Commotion, Three)	**The Hui – Annabelle Lee, Adrian Stevanon & Mihingarangi Forbes (Great Southern Film and Television, Three)**; Waka Huia – Megan Douglas, Ngahuia Wade & Mana Epiha (Scottie Productions, TVNZ1); Kiingitanga – Behind the Throne – Enter the Dragon (Maori Television)
Best Pasifika Programme†	Best News Coverage†
**#TalesOfTime – The Coconet TV – Tuki Laumea & Lisa Taouma (Tikilounge Productions, thecoconet.tv)**; Fresh – Tikilounge Productions (TVNZ2); Tagata Pasifika – Stephen Stehlin, Ngaire Fuata & John Utanga (Sunpix, TVNZ1)	**Kaikoura Earthquake – Newshub Team (Three)**; Port Hills Fires – Newshub Team (Three); NZ Herald – Te Kāea News (Māori Television); US Election Night – Newshub Team (Three)
Best Sports Programme†	Best Live Event Coverage†
**Shaun Johnson: Across The Mekong – Gareth Thorne, Kerry Russell, Mark Malaki-Williams, Dean Pooley & Brian Hitchcock (SKY TV)**; The Crowd Goes Wild – Ric Salizzo, Huw Beynon & James Copland (Prime TV); John Campbell: All Blacks in Apia – John Campbell, Kerry Russell, Gareth Thorne, Mark Malaki-Williams & Dean Pooley (SKY TV)	**International Rugby: All Blacks vs British & Irish Lions 1st Test – Brian Hitchcock, Dean Pooley, Marcus Kennedy & Gavin Service (SKY TV / Sky Sports)**; Dancing With The Stars – Grand Final 2015 – Hayley Cunningham, John McDonald (MediaWorks, Three); Vodafone New Zealand Music Awards 2016 – Matiu Sadd, J&A Productions, John McDonald (MediaWorks, Three)
Best Comedy or Comedy Entertainment Programme†	Best Director: Documentary or Factual†
**7 Days – Rob Brown, thedownlowconcept, Jon Bridges (MediaWorks, Three)**; Jono & Ben – Bronwynn Bakker, Ben Boyce, John McDonald (MediaWorks, Three); Funny Girls – Bronwynn Bakker, John McDonald (MediaWorks, Three)	**Mitchell Hawkes – Born This Way: Awa’s Story (Ruckus, TVNZ1)**; Amanda Evans – Gloriavale – Life and Death (Pacific Screen, TVNZ2); Peter Young – The Art of Recovery (Fisheye Films, TVNZ1); Yvonne Mackay – Doubt: The Scott Watson Case (Production Shed TV, TVNZ1)
Best Director: Drama†	Best Director: Multi Camera†
**Robert Sarkies – Jean (Lippy Pictures, TVNZ1)**; Josh Frizzell – The Brokenwood Mysteries 2 (South Pacific Pictures, Prime TV); David Stubbs – Belief: The Possession Of Janet Moses (KHF Media, TVNZ1)	**Mitchell Hawkes – Vodafone New Zealand Music Awards 2016 (MediaWorks, Three)**; Nigel Carpenter – Dancing With The Stars – Grand Final 2015 (MediaWorks, Three); Kingsley Hockley – What Now (WhitebaitMedia, TVNZ2)
Best Script: Comedy†	Best Script: Drama†
**Millen Baird & John Argall – Darryl. An Outward Bound Story (Brown Sugar Apple Grunt Productions, TVNZ On Demand)**; Roseanne Liang – Friday Night Bites (Flat3 Productions, TVNZ On Demand / YouTube); Rose Matafeo, Nic Sampson & Laura Daniel – Funny Girls (MediaWorks, Three)	**Paula Boock & Donna Malane – Jean (Lippy Pictures, TVNZ1)**; John Banas – Bombshell (Screentime NZ, TVNZ1); Tom Scott – Hillary (Great Southern Film and Television, TVNZ1)
Godfrey Hirst Best Actress†	Selaks Taste Collection Best Actor†
**Kate Elliott – Jean (Lippy Pictures, TVNZ1)**; Esther Stephens – Westside 2 (South Pacific Pictures, Three); Antonia Prebble – Westside 2 (South Pacific Pictures, Three)	**Dean O’Gorman – Hillary (Great Southern Film and Television, TVNZ1)**; Andrew Munro – Hillary (Great Southern Film and Television, TVNZ1); Kahn West – Terry Teo (Semi-Professional Pictures, TVNZ2)
SKYCITY Best Presenter: Entertainment†	Best Presenter: News and Current Affairs†
**The Topp Twins – Jools & Lynda Topp – Topp Country Season Two (Diva Productions, TVNZ1)**; Rachel Hunter – Rachel Hunter’s Tour of Beauty (Imagination Television, TVNZ1); Te Radar – Te Radar’s Chequered Past (Monsoon Pictures International, TVNZ1)	**Mike McRoberts – Newshub Live at 6pm (MediaWorks, Three)**; Kanoa Lloyd – The Project (MediaWorks, Three); Jesse Mulligan – The Project (MediaWorks, Three)
Woman's Day Television Personality Of The Year†	TV Legend†
**Toni Street**; Pua Magasiva; Jack Tame; Miriama Kamo; Rachel Hunter; Hilary Barry; Kanoa Lloyd; Dai Henwood; Anika Moa; Jono Pryor	**John Barnett**
Best Editing: Documentary or Factual‡	Best Editing: Drama‡
**Justin Hawkes – Born This Way: Awa’s Story (Ruckus)**	**Peter Roberts – Jean (Lippy Pictures)**
Best Camerawork: Documentary or Factual‡	Imagezone Best Cinematography: Drama‡
**Bevan Crothers – Born This Way: Awa’s Story (Ruckus)**	**Ginny Loane – Jean (Lippy Pictures)**
Best Contribution to a Soundtrack‡	Images & Sound Best Original Score‡
**Chris Burt – Jean (Lippy Pictures)**	**Peter Hobbs – Jean (Lippy Pictures)**
Best Post Production Design‡	Best Art Direction or Production Design‡
**Peter McCully – Jean (Lippy Pictures)**	**Mark Robins – Jean (Lippy Pictures)**
Best Costume Design‡	Best Makeup Design‡
**Kirsty Cameron – Jean (Lippy Pictures)**	**Susie Glass – Jean (Lippy Pictures)**
