= 2025 New Zealand Screen Awards =

- Awarded for: Excellence in New Zealand film and television
- Date: 2025
- Location: Auckland
- Country: New Zealand

The New Zealand Screen Awards for 2025 were held on 21 November 2025 at the Viaduct Events Centre in Auckland, New Zealand. Comedian Pax Assadi returned to the event. The ceremony marked the first edition of the awards to recognise both film and television productions, following the expansion and rebranding of the New Zealand Television Awards.

== Nominees and winners ==
Winners are listed first and highlighted in boldface.

Key
† – Non-technical award
‡ – Technical award

NZ On Air Best Drama Series†	New Zealand Film Commission Best Feature Film†
**The Gone – Season 2 – Reikura Kahi, Timothy White, Karl Zohrab, Yvonne Donohoe and Katie Holly (TVNZ 1 / TVNZ+)**; The Brokenwood Mysteries – Tim Balme, Kelly Martin, Sally Campbell and Andrew Szusterman (TVNZ 1 / TVNZ+); Dead Ahead – Nicole Horan and Scotty Cotter (TVNZ 2 / TVNZ+); A Remarkable Place to Die – Philly de Lacey, John Banas, Charlie Haskell and Bridget Bourke (TVNZ 1 / TVNZ+)	**Ka Whawhai Tonu – Thomas Toby Parkinson and Piripi Curtis**; Tinā – Dan Higgins, Mario Gaoa and Miki Magasiva; We Were Dangerous – Morgan Waru and Polly Fryer
New Zealand Film Commission Best Short Film†	Best Comedy Programme†
**Rochelle – Tom Furniss and Luke Sharpe**; First Horse – Awanui Simich-Pene, Puti Simich, Mia Henry-Teirney and Heperi Mita; Lea Tupu'anga | Mother Tongue – Vea Mafile'o, Luciane Buchanan, Alex Lovell and Eldon Booth	**Vince – Bronwynn Bakker, Jono Pryor and Cam Bakker (Three / ThreeNow)**; Madam – Tom Hern, Halaifonua Finau and Belindalee Hope (Three / ThreeNow); Happiness – Luke Di Somma and Kip Chapman (Three / ThreeNow)
Best Factual Series†	NZ On Air Best Documentary – Series†
**Moving Houses – Neil Stitchbury (TVNZ 1 / TVNZ+)**; Country Calendar – Dan Henry and Katherine Edmond (TVNZ 1 / TVNZ+); Bryn & Ku's Singles Club – Sophie Dowson and Jin Fellet	**Motuhaketanga – Kathleen Mantel (Whakaata Māori / MĀORI+)**; Live and Let Dai – Charlotte Hobson, Dai Henwood, Hayley Cunningham, Andrew Szusterman and Kelly Martin (Three / ThreeNow); Patrick Gower: On Ice – Arwen O'Connor (Three / ThreeNow)
New Zealand Film Commission Best Documentary – Feature†	Best Reality Series†
**Never Look Away – Matthew Metcalfe, Tom Blackwell and Lucy Lawless**; Stylebender – Fraser Brown, Leela Menon and Tom Blackwell; Maurice and I – Rick Harvie and Jane Mahoney; The Lie – Matthew Metcalfe and Tom Blackwell	**The Restaurant That Makes Mistakes – Ben Bayly, Adrian Stevanon, Sam Blackley, Philip Smith and Briar Coleman (TVNZ 2 / TVNZ+)**; The Traitors New Zealand – Charlotte Hobson, Hayley Cunningham, Kelly Martin, Andrew Szusterman and Jasper Hoogendoorn (Three / ThreeNow); Match Fit: Union vs League – Kimberley Hurley and Bailey Mackey (Three / ThreeNow)
Best Current Affairs Programme†	NZ On Air Best Children's Programme†
**The Hui – Rewa Harriman, Phillip Smith, Ruwani Perera and John Boynton**; Te Ao with Moana – Hikurangi Kimiora Jackson and Cameron Bennett (Whakaata Māori / MĀORI+); Mata with Mihingarangi Forbes – Annabelle Lee-Mather, Mihingarangi Forbes and Natasha Vela (RNZ / YouTube)	**First Place – Eileen Lee and Hope Papali'i (TVNZ)**; Secrets at Red Rocks – Richard Fletcher and David Stubbs (Sky Open / Neon); Kea Kids News – Luke Nola and Kendall Kukahiko (Sky Open)
Te Māngai Pāho Best Māori Programme†	Te Māngai Pāho Best Reo Māori Programme†
**Homesteads – Season 2 – Kimiora Kaire-Melbourne (Whakaata Māori / MĀORI+)**; Māori All Blacks: Bound by Blood – Joe Whitehead and Kimberley Hurley (Whakaata Māori / MĀORI+ / NZR+); Dead Ahead – Nicole Horan and Scotty Cotter (TVNZ+); Mata Reports – Annabelle Lee-Mather, Mihingarangi Forbes, Eugene Bingham and Natasha Vela (RNZ / YouTube)	**Ruamata: It's More Than Hockey 2 – Kereama Wright, Mahanga Pihama, Riria Morgan, Arthur Rasmussen and Matua Houltham (RNZ)**; Te Matatini o Te Kāhui Maunga – Brendon Butt and Bailey Mackey (TVNZ / Whakaata Māori / MĀORI+); End of the Valley – Lea McLean and Richard Curtis (Whakaata Māori / MĀORI+)
NZ On Air Best Pasifika Programme†	Best News Coverage†
**We The South: The Manukau Rovers Story – Mark Malaki-Williams and Ross Karl (Sky Sport)**; Being Niuean – Natasha Panui-Morris and Shimpal Lelisi; Fight For The Pacific – Tuki Laumea and Cleo Fraser; First Place – Eileen Lee and Hope Papali'i (TVNZ)	**Kiingitanga Tangihanga – Phil O'Sullivan, Laura Barnsley and Tati Urale (1 News / TVNZ 1 / TVNZ+)**; Tasman Flooding – Phil O'Sullivan, Laura Barnsley and Tati Urale (1 News / TVNZ 1 / TVNZ+); America's Cup Coverage – Lisette Reymer, Lucy Thomson, Lawrence Smith, Claire Watson and Tom Bartlett (Stuff.co.nz / ThreeNews / Three / ThreeNow); Hīkoi ki Paremata – Roihana Nuri, Ripeka Timutimu and Peata Melbourne
Best Sports Programme†	Best Live Event Coverage†
**Grit & Glory – Robyn Scott-Vincent, Peter Brook Bell and Dan Salmon (TVNZ 1 / TVNZ+)**; Māori All Blacks: Bound by Blood – Joe Whitehead and Kimberley Hurley (Whakaata Māori / NZR+); We The South: The Manukau Rovers Story – Mark Malaki-Williams and Ross Karl (Sky Sport)	**Te Raa Nehu o te Tangihanga o te Kiingi Tuuheitia Pootatau Te Wherowhero VII – Ngatapa Black and Mokotini Templeton (Whakaata Māori / MĀORI+)**; Matariki mā Puanga 2025 – Brendon Butt; Te Matatini o Te Kāhui Maunga – Brendon Butt and Bailey Mackey (TVNZ 1 / TVNZ+ / Whakaata Māori / MĀORI+)
Soljans Estate Winery Best Entertainment Programme†	Best Director: Documentary/Factual Series†
**Taskmaster NZ – Season 5 – Bronwynn Bakker, Cam Bakker and Paul Williams (TVNZ 2 / TVNZ+)**; Guy Montgomery's Guy-Mont Spelling Bee – Season 2 – Bronwynn Bakker, Claudine Maclean, Guy Montgomery and Cam Bakker (Three / ThreeNow); Whakauria – Joe Whitehead (Whakaata Māori / MĀORI+)	**Kathleen Mantel, Motuhaketanga (Whakaata Māori / MĀORI+)**; Mike Gattanella, Polk: The Trial of Philip Polkinghorne (Three / ThreeNow); Rachel Currie, Diary of a Junior Doctor (TVNZ 1 / TVNZ+)
Best Director: Documentary Feature†	Screen Auckland Best Director: Drama Series†
**Katie Wolfe, The Haka Party Incident (RNZ)**; Julian Arahanga, The Stolen Children of Aotearoa (Whakaata Māori); Rick Harvie and Jane Mahoney, Maurice and I	**Peter Meteherangi Tikao Burger, The Gone – Season 2 (TVNZ 1 / TVNZ+)**; Carey Carter, End of the Valley (Whakaata Māori / MĀORI+); Chris Parker, Double Parked – Season 2 (Three / ThreeNow)
Directors and Editors Guild of Aotearoa New Zealand Best Director: Drama Feature†	Best Actress in a Series†
**Lee Tamahori, The Convert**; Miki Magasiva, Tinā; James Ashcroft, The Rule of Jenny Pen	**Antonia Prebble, Double Parked – Season 2 (Three / ThreeNow)**; Madeleine Sami, Double Parked – Season 2 (Three / ThreeNow); Miriama Smith, Dead Ahead (TVNZ+)
Equity New Zealand Best Actress in a Feature†	Best Supporting Actress in a Series†
**Anapela Polata'ivao, Tinā**; Elizabeth Hawthorne, The Moon Is Upside Down; Victoria Haralabidou, The Moon Is Upside Down; Erana James, We Were Dangerous	**Kura Forrester, Double Parked – Season 2 (Three / ThreeNow)**; Natalie Medlock, Vince (Three / ThreeNow); Ariana Osborne, Madam (Three / ThreeNow)
Best Supporting Actress in a Feature†	Best Actor in a Series†
**Antonia Eaton, Tinā**; Miriama Smith, Ka Whawhai Tonu; Rima Te Wiata, We Were Dangerous	**Stephen Lovatt, Shortland Street (TVNZ 2 / TVNZ+)**; Richard Flood, The Gone – Season 2 (TVNZ 1 / TVNZ+); Xavier Horan, Dead Ahead (TVNZ+)
Best Actor in a Feature†	Best Supporting Actor in a Series†
**John Lithgow, The Rule of Jenny Pen**; Geoffrey Rush, The Rule of Jenny Pen; Ed Oxenbould, Head South; Julian Dennison, Uproar	**Peter Hambleton, Happiness (Three / ThreeNow)**; Martin Henderson, Madam (Three / ThreeNow); Dominic Ona-Ariki, Double Parked – Season 2 (Three / ThreeNow)
Best Supporting Actor in a Feature†	Reporter of the Year†
**George Henare, The Rule of Jenny Pen**; Beulah Koale, Tinā; Temuera Morrison, Ka Whawhai Tonu	**Indira Stewart, TVNZ+ In-Depth (TVNZ 1 / TVNZ+)**; Paula Penfold, ThreeNews (Stuff.co.nz / Three / ThreeNow); Michael Morrah, Michael Morrah Investigates (NZ Herald / NZME); Barbara Dreaver, 1 News (TVNZ 1 / TVNZ+)
Best Presenter: Entertainment†	Best Presenter: News and Current Affairs†
**Brynley Stent and Kura Forrester, Bryn & Ku's Singles Club**; Jeremy Corbett, 7 Days (Sky Open / Three / ThreeNow); Guy Montgomery and Sanjay Patel, Guy Montgomery's Guy-Mont Spelling Bee – Season 2 (Three / ThreeNow); Dave Letele, Heavyweight with Dave Letele (TVNZ 2 / TVNZ+)	**John Campbell (TVNZ 1 / TVNZ+)**; Ryan Bridge, HeraldNOW (NZ Herald / NZME); Moana Maniapoto, Te Ao with Moana (Whakaata Māori / MĀORI+); Jack Tame, Q+A with Jack Tame (TVNZ 1 / TVNZ+)
Best Editing: Documentary / Factual – Series‡	Best Editing: Documentary / Factual – Feature‡
**Tim Woodhouse and James Brown, Choir Games (Sky Open / Neon)**; Justin Hawkes, Live and Let Dai (Three / ThreeNow); Simon Coldrick, Polk: The Trial of Philip Polkinghorne (Three / ThreeNow)	**Richard Lord, Maurice and I**; Sacha Campbell, Alien Weaponry: Kua Tupu Te Ara; Josh Yong, Marlon Williams: Ngā Ao E Rua Two Worlds (Whakaata Māori)
Best Editing: Drama – Series‡	Directors and Editors Guild of Aotearoa New Zealand Best Editing: Drama – Feature‡
**Bryan Shaw, The Gone – Season 2 (TVNZ 1 / TVNZ+)**; Lisa Hough, Happiness (Three / ThreeNow); Luke Earl and Rhys Green, Double Parked – Season 2 (Three / ThreeNow)	**Chris Plummer and Martin Brinkler, Joika**; Gretchen Peterson, The Rule of Jenny Pen; Luke Haigh, The Convert
Best Camerawork: Documentary / Factual – Series‡	Best Camerawork: Documentary / Factual – Feature‡
**Dominic Fryer, Live and Let Dai (Three / ThreeNow)**; Sean Loftin, Wheel Blacks: Bodies on the Line (Sky Open / Neon); Tom Fowlie, Homesteads – Season 2 (Whakaata Māori / MĀORI+)	**Tim Flower, Marlon Williams: Ngā Ao E Rua Two Worlds (Whakaata Māori)**; Evan Howell, Unmasking The Monsters; Brandon Te Moananui, The Stolen Children of Aotearoa (Whakaata Māori)
Best Director: Multi-Camera‡	Images and Sound Best Cinematography: Drama Series‡
**Marcus Kennedy, 2024 Bledisloe Cup – Wellington (Sky Sport)**; Marcus Hillyard, Constellation Cup – Silver Ferns v Australia (Sky Sport); Matt Barrett, Anzac 2025 (Whakaata Māori / MĀORI+); Mark Kearns, 2025 Super Rugby – Crusaders v Blues (Sky Sport)	**Dave Cameron NZCS ACS, A Remarkable Place to Die (TVNZ 1 / TVNZ+)**; Dave Cameron NZCS ACS, Madam (Three / ThreeNow); Simon Tutty, Secrets at Red Rocks (Sky Open / Neon)
Images and Sound Best Cinematography: Feature Film‡	Best Contribution to a Soundtrack: Series‡
**Gin Loane, The Convert**; Maria Inês Manchego NZCS, We Were Dangerous; Richard Bluck, Ash; Andrew McGeorge, Tinā	**Tom Miskin, Melanie Graham, Mike Bayliss and Steve Finnigan, Secrets at Red Rocks (Sky Open / Neon)**; Pinnacle Post Sound Team, Time Bandits (Apple TV+); Envy Studios, Badjelly (TVNZ 2 / TVNZ+)
Screen Music & Sound Guild of New Zealand Best Contribution to a Soundtrack: Feature‡	Images and Sound Best Original Score – Series‡
**John McKay and Matthew Lambourn, The Rule of Jenny Pen**; Nick Buckton, Joika; Dick Reade and Bruce Langley, Ka Whawhai Tonu; Liquid Studios, Tinā	**Mahuia Bridgman-Cooper, The Gone – Season 2 (TVNZ 1 / TVNZ+)**; Plan 9 – Janet Roddick, Steve Roche and David Donaldson, A Remarkable Place to Die (TVNZ 1 / TVNZ+); Stephen Gallagher and David Long, Secrets at Red Rocks (Sky Open / Neon)
Images and Sound Best Original Score – Feature‡	Best Post Production Design – Series‡
**Arli Liberman and Tiki Taane, Ka Whawhai Tonu**; Dana Lund, Joika; John Gibson, The Rule of Jenny Pen; Sebastien Pan, Tinā	**Damian McDonnell – Colourist, Time Bandits (Apple TV+)**; Alana Cotton – Colourist, Secrets at Red Rocks (Sky Open / Neon); Jemma Lee – Colourist, End of the Valley (Whakaata Māori / MĀORI+)
Best Post Production Design – Feature‡	Best Production Design – Series‡
**Carol Petrie, Jacob Leaf and Brenton Cumberpatch – VFX, Ash**; Alana Cotton – Colourist, Ash; James Gardner – Colourist, Ka Whawhai Tonu	**John Allan, Under the Vines – Season 3 (TVNZ 1 / TVNZ+)**; Nick Williams, The Gone – Season 2 (TVNZ 1 / TVNZ+); Kylie Tiuka, End of the Valley (Whakaata Māori / MĀORI+)
Best Production Design – Feature‡	Best Costume Design – Series‡
**Nick Williams and Guy Moana, The Convert**; Shayne Radford, Ka Whawhai Tonu; Miro Harré, We Were Dangerous	**Sarah Voon, My Life Is Murder (TVNZ 1 / TVNZ+)**; Tania Klouwens, The Brokenwood Mysteries (TVNZ 1 / TVNZ+); Sammy Salsa, Madam (Three / ThreeNow)
Best Costume Design – Feature‡	Best Makeup Design – Series‡
**Liz McGregor, The Convert**; Te Ura Hoskins, Ka Whawhai Tonu; Daisy Marcuzzi, We Were Dangerous	**Kevin Dufty, The Brokenwood Mysteries (TVNZ 1 / TVNZ+)**; Kevin Dufty, Happiness (Three / ThreeNow); Terese Tomlins, Dead Ahead (TVNZ+)
Best Makeup Design – Feature‡	Australian Writers' Guild Authorship Collecting Society Best Script: Series†
**Gabrielle Jones, The Convert**; Verity Griffiths and Brydie Stone, Forgive Us All; Frankie Karena and Don Brooker, The Rule of Jenny Pen	**Tim Balme, The Brokenwood Mysteries (TVNZ 1 / TVNZ+)**; Victoria Boult, n00b (Three / ThreeNow); Richard J Curtis and Lea Mclean, End of the Valley (Whakaata Māori / MĀORI+); Dan Musgrove, Happiness (Three / ThreeNow)
New Zealand Writers Guild Best Script: Feature†	
**Eli Kent and James Ashcroft, The Rule of Jenny Pen**; Miki Magasiva, Tinā; Christine Jeffs, A Mistake	
