= Victoria Kelly (New Zealand composer) =

New Zealand composer, arranger, and vocalist

Victoria Kelly is a New Zealand composer, arranger, and vocalist.

== Background ==
Kelly studied music performance (oboe) at the University of Auckland, later focussing on composition. After finishing first equal in the University of Auckland composition prize concert, winning a TVNZ Young Achievers Award, and being awarded a professional development grant from Creative New Zealand, Kelly studied film composition at the University of Southern California.

== Career ==
Kelly has composed over twenty film and television soundtracks, primarily in New Zealand. These include soundtracks for Under the Mountain, Out of the Blue, Black Sheep, and Realiti. In 2007, she received a NZ Screen Award for her soundtrack for the television series Maddigan's Quest.

As well as her composition and orchestration work, Kelly was the featured vocalist for the song Beautiful Skin with the New Zealand group Strawpeople. She was also the musical director of the opening ceremony for the 2011 Rugby World Cup. She was a member of The Bellbirds with Don McGlashan, Sean Donnelly, and Sandy Mill. In 2014, she was appointed as the NZ Members Manager of APRA AMCOS NZ. She also acted in Being Eve and the short film Charlie's Box.

Musicians, film, and television directors that Kelly has worked with, in addition to those mentioned above, include Neil Finn, The New Zealand Symphony Orchestra, The Auckland Philharmonia, The New Zealand String Quartet, Anika Moa, Shapeshifter, Harry Sinclair, Peter Jackson, Jonathan King, and Robert Sarkies.

In 2025 Kelly was Composer in Residence with Orchestra Wellington.

== Awards ==
Kelly has been nominated for awards including the APRA Silver Scroll, Aotearoa Film and Television Awards, and TV Guide New Zealand Television Awards.

In 2026 she was awarded an Arts Laureate by the Arts Foundation of New Zealand.
