= 2019 New Zealand Television Awards =

- Awarded for: Excellence in New Zealand television
- Date: 21 November 2019
- Location: Auckland
- Country: New Zealand
- Hosted by: Alice Snedden

The Huawei Mate30 Pro New Zealand Television Awards for 2019 were held on 21 November 2019 at Aotea Centre in Auckland, New Zealand. The event was hosted by Alice Snedden.

== Nominees and winners ==
Winners are listed first and highlighted in boldface.

Key
† – Non-technical award
‡ – Technical award

=== Television ===
NZ On Air Best Drama Series†	Images & Sound Best Feature Drama†
**Mark Beesley, Kelly Martin, Chris Bailey, James Griffin – Westside (South Pacific Pictures, Three)**; Robin Scholes, Kelly Martin, Chris Bailey – The Bad Seed (South Pacific Pictures and Jump Film & TV Ltd, TVNZ 1); Sally Campbell, Kelly Martin, Chris Bailey, Tim Balme – The Brokenwood Mysteries (South Pacific Pictures, Prime TV)	**Michael Bennett, Jane Holland, Chloe Smith, Kelly Martin, Chris Bailey – In Dark Places (South Pacific Pictures and 10000 Company, TVNZ 1)**; Carmen J Leonard, Thomas Robbins, Charlotte Purdy – Kiwi (Rogue Productions, TVNZ 1); Riccardo Pellizzeri, Bridget Bourke, Philly de Lacey, Screentime NZ – In A Flash (Screentime NZ, TVNZ 1); Raewyn Humphries – Mistress, Mercy: The Renee Chignell Story (The Gibson Group, TVNZ 1)
Best Factual Series†	NZ On Air Best Documentary†
**Owen Hughes – Uncharted with Sam Neill (Frame Up Films, Prime TV)**; Candida Beveridge – Grand Designs NZ (Imagination TV, Three); Arwen O’Connor – The Curious Mind (Ruckus, TVNZ 1)	**Gaylene Preston – My Year with Helen (Gaylene Preston Productions, Three)**; Melanie Reid, Paul Enticott, Phill Prendeville – The Uplift (Newsroom); Jill McNabb, Robyn Paterson – In the Zone (Vendetta Films, TVNZ On Demand)
Best Original Reality Series†	Stage & Screen Travel Services Best Format Reality Series†
**Carmen J Leonard, Susan Leonard, Annabelle Lee-Mather, Philip Smith – The Casketeers (Great Southern Television, TVNZ 1)**; Sarah-Luise Whatford – Police Ten 7 (Screentime NZ, TVNZ 1); Lost and Found season 4 – Lost and Found (Warner Bros. New Zealand, Three)	**John McDonald, Hayley Cunningham, Charlotte Hobson – Dancing with the Stars S8 (MediaWorks NZ, Three)**; Sue Woodfield, Angela Mann, Emma White, Greg Heathcote, Aaron Dolbel – The Block NZ S7 (MediaWorks NZ, Three); Dominic Smith – Secret Life of Girls (Screentime NZ, TVNZ 1)
Best Lifestyle Programme†	Best Current Affairs Programme†
**Piri’s Tiki Tour (Pango Productions) – Hokianga (Pango Productions, Māori Television)**; Fishing and Adventure – Fiordland Part 1 (Bullet Ride Ltd, TVNZ 1); Easy Eats (Pango Productions) – Easy Eats (Pango Productions, Māori Television)	**Melanie Reid, Paul Enticott, Mark Jennings, Tim Murphy – Newsroom Investigates (Newsroom)**; Annabelle Lee-Mather, Rewa Harriman, Mihingarangi Forbes, Philip Smith – The Hui (Great Southern Television, Three); Eugene Bingham, Phil Johnson, Toby Longbottom, Paula Penfold – Stuff Circuit (Stuff Circuit, Stuff NZ)
Best Web Series†	NZ On Air Best Children’s Programme†
**Jazz Thornton, Alex Reed, Cass Avery – Jessica’s Tree (Augusto, NZME)**; Gerard Smyth, Jendy Harper, Oliver Dawe – Frank – Changing South (Frank Film, YouTube); Jesse Griffin, Rachel Jean, Jackie van Beek, Jonny Brugh, Kelly Martin, Chris Bailey – Educators (South Pacific Pictures, TVNZ On Demand)	**Phil Brough, Matt Heath, Orlando Stewart – Welcome to Cardboard City (Vinewood Animation Studio, TVNZ HeiHei)**; Fiona Copland, Harry Sinclair – Kiri and Lou (Kiri and Lou, TVNZ HeiHei); Te Amokura Productions – Tiki Towns (Te Amokura Productions, Prime TV & Nickleodeon)
Te Māngai Pāho Best Māori Programme†	Te Māngai Pāho Best Reo Programme†
**Carmen J Leonard, Susan Leonard, Annabelle Lee-Mather, Philip Smith – The Casketeers (Great Southern Television, TVNZ 1)**; Mako Media Ltd – Haka Life (Mako Media Ltd, Māori Television); Te Ori Paki, Nix Jacques, David Clayton Green, Kewana Duncan – Marae DIY (Screentime NZ, Māori Television)	**Kereama Wright, Mana Epiha, Megan Douglas – Waka Huia - Rereata Makiha (Scottie Productions, TVNZ 1)**; Nicole Hoey, Campbell Farquhar – Tākaro Tribe (Cinco Cine Film Productions, TVNZ On Demand); Ngahuia Wade – Whiua te Pātai (Māori Television, Māori Television)
NZ On Air Best Pasifika Programme†	Best News Coverage†
**Tuki Laumea, Lisa Taouma – 1918: Samoa & The Talune - Ship Of Death (Tikilounge Productions, The Coconet)**; Dana Youngman, Damon Fepulea'i – Life After Footy - Legends of the Pacific (Tikilounge Productions, Prime TV); Elizabeth Koroivulaono, Indira Stewart – Daughters of the Migration – Fala Haulangi (Tikilounge Productions, The Coconet)	**Newshub News Team – Christchurch Mosque Shootings (MediaWorks NZ, Three)**; Newshub News Team – Newshub: Tasman Fires (MediaWorks NZ, Three); 1 News – Christchurch Terrorist Attack (1 News, TVNZ1)
Monstavision Best Sports Programme†	Best Live Event Coverage†
**Brian Hitchcock, Dean Pooley, Gareth Thorne, Simon Head, Mark Malaki-Williams – Keeping the Faith: 25 Years of the Warriors (Sky Sport, Sky NZ)**; Brian Hitchcock, Dean Pooley, Gareth Thorne, Kerry Russell, Carl Matthews – Joseph Parker: Metamorphosis (Sky Sport, Sky NZ); Brian Hitchcock, Dean Pooley, Gareth Thorne, Simon Head, Mark Malaki-Williams – Keeping the Faith: 25 Years of the Warriors Ep 2 (Sky Sport, Sky NZ); Dana Youngman, Damon Fepulea'i – Life After Footy, Legends of the Pacific (Tikilounge Productions, Prime TV)	**TVNZ – The National Memorial Service (TVNZ, TVNZ 1)**; Annabelle Lee-Mather, Mihingarangi Forbes, Rewa Harriman, Philip Smith – The Hui: Mike King Special (Great Southern Television, Three); John McDonald, Hayley Cunningham, Charlotte Hobson – Dancing with the Stars S8 (MediaWorks NZ, Three); Newshub News Team – Christchurch Mosque Shootings (MediaWorks NZ, Three)
Best Comedy/Comedy Entertainment Programme†	Best Director: Documentary/Factual†
**Browynn Bakker, John McDonald – Funny Girls Suffragette Special (MediaWorks NZ, Three)**; Rogue Productions – Anika Moa Unleashed S2 (Rogue Productions, TVNZ On Demand); Nick Ward, Kim Harrop – Fresh Eggs (Warner Bros. New Zealand, TVNZ 2)	**Gaylene Preston – My Year with Helen (Gaylene Preston Productions, Three)**; Colin Rothbart – Dark Tourist (Razor Fumes, Netflix); Sally Aitken – Uncharted with Sam Neill (Frame Up Films, Prime TV)
Screen Auckland Best Director: Drama†	Huawei Mate30 Pro Best Actress†
**Michael Bennett – In Dark Places (South Pacific Pictures and 10000 Company, TVNZ 1)**; David de Lautour – Alibi (Plus6Four, TVNZ On Demand); Josh Frizzell – Fresh Eggs (Warner Bros. New Zealand, TVNZ 2)	**Danielle Cormack – Fresh Eggs (Warner Bros. New Zealand)**; Karen O’Leary – Wellington Paranormal (New Zealand Documentary Board Ltd, TVNZ 2); Claire Chitham – Fresh Eggs (Warner Bros. New Zealand, TVNZ 2); Nancy Brunning – In Dark Places (South Pacific Pictures and 10000 Company, TVNZ 1)
Best Actor†	Reporter of the Year†
**Mike Minogue – Wellington Paranormal (New Zealand Documentary Board Ltd, TVNZ 2)**; Joel Tobeck – Alibi (Plus6Four, TVNZ On Demand); Richard Te Are – In Dark Places (South Pacific Pictures and 10000 Company, TVNZ 1)	**Paula Penfold – Stuff Circuit (Stuff NZ)**; Melanie Reid – Newsroom (Newsroom); Janet McIntyre – Sunday (TVNZ, TVNZ 1)
Huawei Mate30 Pro Best Presenter: Entertainment†	Best Presenter: News & Current Affairs†
**Anika Moa – Anika Moa Unleashed S2 (Rogue Productions, TVNZ On Demand)**; Sam Neill – Uncharted with Sam Neill (Frame Up Films, Prime TV); Nigel Latta – The Curious Mind (Ruckus, TVNZ 1)	**Hilary Barry – Christchurch Terror Attack (TVNZ, TVNZ 1)**; Patrick Gower – The Project (MediaWorks NZ, Three); John Campbell – Christchurch Terror Attack (TVNZ, TVNZ 1)
Woman’s Day Television Personality of the Year†	Huawei Mate30 Pro Television Legend†
**Matty McLean – Breakfast**	**Shortland Street (South Pacific Pictures)**

=== Craft awards ===
Best Editing: Documentary/Factual‡	Best Editing: Drama‡
**Johnny Agnew – The Unortho_docs (Two Heads, TVNZ On Demand)**; Paul Sutorius – My Year with Helen (Gaylene Preston Productions, Three); Richard Shaw – Dark Tourist (Razor Fumes, Netflix)	**Raewyn Humphries – Mistress, Mercy: The Renee Chignell Story (The Gibson Group, TVNZ 1)**; Kerry Roggio – The Brokenwood Mysteries (South Pacific Pictures, Prime TV); Allannah Bazzard – Fresh Eggs (Warner Bros. New Zealand, TVNZ 2)
Huawei Mate30 Pro Best Camerawork: Documentary/Factual‡	Best Director: Multi Camera‡
**Johnny Agnew – The Unortho_docs (Two Heads, TVNZ On Demand)**; Jacob Bryant – Dark Tourist (Razor Fumes, Netflix); Phil Johnson – Big Decision (The Abortion Debate) (Stuff Circuit, Stuff NZ)	**Mitchell Hawkes – You Are Us / Aroha Nui (MediaWorks NZ, Three)**; Nigel Carpenter – Vodafone New Zealand Music Awards 2018 (MediaWorks NZ, Three); Marcus Kennedy – All Blacks vs Argentina (Sky Sport, Sky NZ)
Best Cinematography: Drama‡	Best Contribution to a Soundtrack‡
**DJ Stipsen – Fresh Eggs (Warner Bros. New Zealand, TVNZ 2)**; Dave Garbett – The Bad Seed (South Pacific Pictures and Jump Film & TV Ltd, TVNZ 1); Alun Bollinger – In Dark Places (South Pacific Pictures and 10000 Company, TVNZ 1)	**Chris Sinclair, Steve Finnigan, Ben Sinclair, Images & Sound – In Dark Places (Images & Sound for South Pacific Pictures and 10000 Company, TVNZ 1)**; Tom Miskin, Steve Finnigan, Alan Kidd, Mike Bayliss, Images & Sound – The Bad Seed (Images & Sound for South Pacific Pictures & Jump Film & TV Ltd, TVNZ 1); Chris Burt – In a Flash (Inside Track for Screentime NZ, TVNZ 1)
Images & Sound Best Original Score‡	Best Post Production Design‡
**Don McGlashan – Kiri and Lou (TVNZ HeiHei)**; Jan Preston – My Year with Helen (Gaylene Preston Productions, Three); Mike Newport – Alibi (Plus6Four, TVNZ On Demand); Tihema Bennett, Joel Haines – In Dark Places (South Pacific Pictures and 10000 Company, TVNZ 1)	**Mikee Carpinter – The Unortho_docs (Two Heads, TVNZ On Demand)**; Alana Cotton – In Dark Places (Images & Sound for South Pacific Pictures and 10000 Company, TVNZ 1); Andrew Brown – Straight Forward (Toybox Post for Screentime NZ, TVNZ On Demand)
Screen Auckland Best Art Direction or Production Design‡	Best Costume Design‡
**George Hamilton – Fresh Eggs (Warner Bros. New Zealand, TVNZ 2)**; Miro Harre – In Dark Places (South Pacific Pictures and 10000 Company, TVNZ 1); Nick Williams – The Bad Seed (South Pacific Pictures and Jump Film & TV Ltd, TVNZ 1)	**Sarah Voon – Give Kate a Voice (Vendetta Productions, Noted)**; Sacha Teuila – Dancing with the Stars S8 (MediaWorks NZ, Three); Jaindra Watson – In Dark Places (South Pacific Pictures and 10000 Company, TVNZ 1)
Revlon Best Makeup Design‡	Huawei Mate30 Pro Best Script: Comedy‡
**Stefan Knight – Fresh Eggs (Warner Bros. New Zealand, TVNZ 2)**; Katherine Gould – Dancing with the Stars S8 (MediaWorks NZ, Three); Don Brooker, Frankie Karena, Sean Foot – Wellington Paranormal (New Zealand Documentary Board Ltd, TVNZ 2)	**Louis Mendiola – The Adventures of Suzy Boon (R&R, TVNZ On Demand)**; Jemaine Clement, Paul Yates – Wellington Paranormal (New Zealand Documentary Board Ltd, TVNZ 2); Amanda Alison – Mean Mums (South Pacific Pictures, Three)
Best Script: Drama‡	
**Sarah-Kate Lynch, Michael Beran, Joss King – The Bad Seed (South Pacific Pictures and Jump Film & TV Ltd, TVNZ 1)**; Hannah Marshall & David de Lautour – Alibi (Plus6Four, TVNZ On Demand); Michael Bennett, Jane Holland – In Dark Places (South Pacific Pictures and 10000 Company, TVNZ 1)	
