= 2020 New Zealand Television Awards =

- Awarded for: Excellence in New Zealand television
- Date: 18 November 2020
- Location: Auckland
- Country: New Zealand
- Hosted by: Tom Sainsbury & Angella Dravid

The New Zealand Television Awards for 2020 were held on 18 November 2020 at Shed 10 in Auckland, New Zealand. The event was hosted by comedian Tom Sainsbury with assistance from comedian Angella Dravid.

== Nominees and winners ==
Winners are listed first and highlighted in boldface.

Key
† – Non-technical award
‡ – Technical award

=== Television ===
NZ On Air Best Drama Series†	Images & Sound Best Feature Drama†
**One Lane Bridge – Philip Smith, Carmen J Leonard & Deb Cope (Great Southern Television, TVNZ 1)**; Head High – Kelly Martin, Chris Bailey & Tim Balme (South Pacific Pictures, Three); The Luminaries – Lisa Chatfield, Claudia Bluemhuber, Tim Bevan & Eric Fellner (Southern Light Films & Working Title TV, TVNZ 1)	**Runaway Millionaires – Carmen J Leonard, Deb Cope & Danny Mulheron (Fearless Productions, TVNZ 1)**; Jonah – Riccardo Pellizzeri, Carmen J Leonard & Deb Cope (Great Southern Television, Three); Ablaze – Carmen J Leonard, Deb Cope & Mikaela Rooney (Fearless Productions, TVNZ 1)
Best Factual Series†	Best Documentary†
**Hyundai Country Calendar – Julian O'Brien & Dan Henry (TVNZ, TVNZ 1)**; Funny As: The Story of New Zealand Comedy – Paul Horan, Bronwynn Bakker & Deb Cope (Augusto, TVNZ 1); Patrick Gower: On Weed – Jon Bridges & Charlotte Purdy (Ruckus, Three)	**By the Balls – Charlotte Purdy (Rogue Productions, TVNZ 1)**; Herbs: Songs of Freedom – Tearepa Kahi (Monsoon Pictures International, Māori Television); NZ Wars: Stories of Waitara – Mihingarangi Forbes, Annabelle Lee-Mather, Mahanga Pihama, Philip Smith & Deb Cope (Great Southern Television, RNZ)
Best Original Reality Series†	Best Format Reality Series†
**Unbreakable – Rachel Currie (Storymaker, TVNZ 1)**; The Casketeers – Carmen J Leonard, Susan Leonard, Annabelle Lee-Mather & Philip Smith (Great Southern Television, TVNZ 1); Lost and Found – David Lomas, Sue Woodfield & Angela Mann (Warner Bros. New Zealand, Three)	**My Restaurant Rules – Simon Fleming, Anna Lynch & Philip Smith (Great Southern Television, TVNZ 2)**; Dancing with the Stars – John McDonald, Hayley Cunningham & Charlotte Hobson (MediaWorks, Three); The Block NZ – Emma White, Greg Heathcote, Sue Woodfield, Angela Mann & Aaron Dolbel (Warner Bros. New Zealand, Three)
Best Lifestyle Programme†	Best Current Affairs Programme†
**Off the Grid with Pio – Meg Douglas (Scottie Douglas Productions, Māori Television)**; Hyundai Country Calendar – Julian O'Brien & Dan Henry (TVNZ, TVNZ 1); Piri's Tiki Tour – Bailey Mackey (Pango Productions, Māori Television)	**Stuff Circuit – Toby Longbottom, Paula Penfold, Phil Johnson & Eugene Bingham (Stuff Circuit, Stuff)**; The Hui – Annabelle Lee-Mather, Mihingarangi Forbes, Rewa Harriman & Philip Smith (Great Southern Television, Three); Patrick Gower: On Weed – Jon Bridges & Charlotte Purdy (Ruckus, Three)
NZ On Air Best Children's Programme†	Te Māngai Pāho Best Māori Programme†
**Kiri and Lou – Fiona Copland (Stretchy, TVNZ 2)**; The Moe Show – Jeremy Dillon & Amy Barber (Pop-Up Workshop, TVNZ 2); Darwin & Newts – Brenda Leeuwenberg & Andrew Smith (WhitebaitMedia, TVNZ 2)	**NZ Wars: Stories of Waitara – Mihingarangi Forbes, Annabelle Lee-Mather, Mahanga Pihama, Philip Smith & Deb Cope (Great Southern Television, RNZ)**; The Casketeers – Carmen J Leonard, Susan Leonard, Annabelle Lee-Mather & Philip Smith (Great Southern Television, TVNZ 1); Haka Life – Mako Media Ltd (Māori Television)
Te Māngai Pāho Best Reo Māori Programme†	NZ On Air Best Pasifika Programme†
**Waka Huia – Whatanui Flavell, Meg Douglas & Ani-Piki Tuari (Scottie Douglas Productions, TVNZ 1)**; Te Ao with Moana – Moana Maniapoto (Māori Television); Tākaro Tribe – Nicole Hoey & Campbell Farquhar (Cinco Cine Film Productions, TVNZ 2)	**Marks of Mana – Lisa Taouma (Tikilounge Productions, The Coconet TV)**; Daughters of the Migration – Lisa Taouma (Tikilounge Productions, The Coconet TV); Fresh – Tikilounge Productions (TVNZ 2)
Best News Coverage†	Best Sports Programme†
**Newshub – Samoa Measles Outbreak – Newshub Live at 6pm and The AM Show production teams (MediaWorks, Three)**; 1 News – Whakaari/White Island Eruption (TVNZ, TVNZ 1); Newshub – Whakaari/White Island Eruption (MediaWorks, Three)	**Scratched: Aotearoa's Lost Sporting Legends – Amber Easby, Duncan Greive, Scotty Stevenson & Natalie Wilson (Hex Work Productions, The Spinoff)**; The Road to Tokyo (Sky Sport, Sky NZ); The Kiwi Baker: Shaun Johnson (Sky Sport, Sky NZ)
Best Live Event Coverage†	Best Comedy/Comedy Entertainment Programme†
**Aotearoa 250 – Bailey Mackey, Blake Ihimaera & Matiu Sadd (Pango Productions, TVNZ 1)**; Vodafone New Zealand Music Awards 2019 (MediaWorks, Three); National Remembrance Service – Christchurch (TVNZ, TVNZ 1)	**Wellington Paranormal – Series 2 – Paul Yates, Jemaine Clement & Taika Waititi (New Zealand Documentary Board, TVNZ 2)**; Have You Been Paying Attention? (MediaWorks, Three); Mean Mums – Amanda Alison, Kelly Martin & Chris Bailey (South Pacific Pictures, Three)
Best Director: Documentary / Factual†	Screen Auckland Best Director: Drama†
**Justin Hawkes – Patrick Gower: On Weed (Ruckus, Three)**; Paul Horan – Funny As: The Story of New Zealand Comedy (Augusto, TVNZ 1); Peter Young – Hyundai Country Calendar (TVNZ, TVNZ 1)	**Claire McCarthy – The Luminaries (Southern Light Films & Working Title TV, TVNZ 1)**; Peter Burger – One Lane Bridge (Great Southern Television, TVNZ 1); Danny Mulheron – Runaway Millionaires (Fearless Productions, TVNZ 1)
Best Actress†	Best Supporting Actress†
**Miriama McDowell – Head High (South Pacific Pictures, Three)**; Eve Hewson – The Luminaries (Southern Light Films & Working Title TV, TVNZ 1); Kate Elliott – The Gulf (Screentime New Zealand, Lippy Pictures & Letterbox Filmproduktion, Three)	**Anna Jullienne – Mean Mums (South Pacific Pictures, Three)**; Sara Wiseman – One Lane Bridge (Great Southern Television, TVNZ 1); Eve Gordon – The Luminaries (Southern Light Films & Working Title TV, TVNZ 1)
Best Actor†	Best Supporting Actor†
**Himesh Patel – The Luminaries (Southern Light Films & Working Title TV, TVNZ 1)**; Craig Hall – Head High (South Pacific Pictures, Three); Joel Tobeck – The Gulf (Screentime New Zealand, Lippy Pictures & Letterbox Filmproduktion, Three)	**Jayden Daniels – Head High (South Pacific Pictures, Three)**; Ewen Leslie – The Luminaries (Southern Light Films & Working Title TV, TVNZ 1); Craig Hall – Jonah (Great Southern Television, Three)
Reporter of the Year†	Best Presenter: Entertainment†
**Michael Morrah – Newshub (MediaWorks, Three)**; Paula Penfold – Stuff Circuit (Stuff); Melanie Reid – Newsroom Investigates (Newsroom)	**Patrick Gower – Patrick Gower: On Weed (Ruckus, Three)**; Anika Moa – Anika Moa Unleashed (Rogue Productions); Pio Terei – Off the Grid with Pio (Scottie Douglas Productions, Māori Television)
Best Presenter: News & Current Affairs†	Television Personality of the Year†
**Mihingarangi Forbes – The Hui (Great Southern Television, Three)**; Hilary Barry – Seven Sharp (TVNZ 1); John Campbell – Breakfast (TVNZ 1)	**Hilary Barry – Seven Sharp**
Television Legend†	
**Andrew Shaw**	

=== Craft awards ===
Best Editing: Documentary/Factual‡	Best Editing: Drama‡
**James Brown & Prisca Bouchet – Funny As (Augusto, TVNZ 1)**; Toby Longbottom – Stuff Circuit (Stuff); Richard Shaw – Patrick Gower: On Weed (Ruckus, Three)	**Jochen Fitzherbert – The Gulf (Screentime New Zealand, Lippy Pictures & Letterbox Filmproduktion, Three)**; Alistair Reid – The Luminaries (Southern Light Films & Working Title TV, TVNZ 1); Allanah Bazzard – One Lane Bridge (Great Southern Television, TVNZ 1)
Best Camerawork: Documentary/Factual‡	Best Director: Multi Camera‡
**Peter Young – Hyundai Country Calendar (TVNZ, TVNZ 1)**; Phil Johnson – Stuff Circuit (Stuff); Johnny Agnew – Funny As (Augusto, TVNZ 1)	**Glen Broomhall – Pacific Island Food Revolution (Pacific Island Productions, TVNZ 1)**; Marcus Kennedy – All Blacks vs South Africa (Sky Sport, Sky NZ); Mitchell Hawkes – Vodafone New Zealand Music Awards 2019 (MediaWorks, Three)
Best Cinematography: Drama‡	Best Contribution to a Soundtrack‡
**Denson Baker, ACS, NZCS – The Luminaries (Southern Light Films & Working Title TV, TVNZ 1)**; Dave Garbett – One Lane Bridge (Great Southern Television, TVNZ 1); John Cavill – The Gulf (Screentime New Zealand, Lippy Pictures & Letterbox Filmproduktion, Three)	**Tom Miskin, Mike Bayliss, Matt Stutter & Steve Finnigan – Images & Sound – One Lane Bridge (Great Southern Television, TVNZ 1)**; Images & Sound – The Luminaries (Southern Light Films & Working Title TV, TVNZ 1); The Gulf – Screentime New Zealand, Lippy Pictures & Letterbox Filmproduktion (Three)
Images & Sound Best Original Score‡	Best Post Production Design‡
**Claire Cowan – Runaway Millionaires (Fearless Productions, TVNZ 1)**; David Long – The Luminaries (Southern Light Films & Working Title TV, TVNZ 1); Moniker – One Lane Bridge (Great Southern Television, TVNZ 1)	**Alana Cotton – The Luminaries (Southern Light Films & Working Title TV, TVNZ 1)**; One Lane Bridge – Great Southern Television (TVNZ 1); The Gulf – Screentime New Zealand, Lippy Pictures & Letterbox Filmproduktion (Three)
Best Production Design‡	Best Costume Design‡
**Felicity Abbott & Daniel Birt – The Luminaries (Southern Light Films & Working Title TV, TVNZ 1)**; One Lane Bridge – Great Southern Television (TVNZ 1); Runaway Millionaires – Fearless Productions (TVNZ 1)	**Edward K. Gibbon – The Luminaries (Southern Light Films & Working Title TV, TVNZ 1)**; One Lane Bridge – Great Southern Television (TVNZ 1); Runaway Millionaires – Fearless Productions (TVNZ 1)
Best Makeup Design‡	Best Script: Comedy‡
**Jane O'Kane – The Luminaries (Southern Light Films & Working Title TV, TVNZ 1)**; One Lane Bridge – Great Southern Television (TVNZ 1); Runaway Millionaires – Fearless Productions (TVNZ 1)	**Paul Yates – Wellington Paranormal – Series 2 Episode 2.4 (New Zealand Documentary Board, TVNZ 2)**; Nick Ward – Wellington Paranormal – Series 2 (New Zealand Documentary Board, TVNZ 2); Amanda Alison – Mean Mums (South Pacific Pictures, Three)
Best Script: Drama‡	
**Eleanor Catton – The Luminaries (Southern Light Films & Working Title TV, TVNZ 1)**; Pip Hall – One Lane Bridge (Great Southern Television, TVNZ 1); Paula Boock & Donna Malane – The Gulf (Screentime New Zealand, Lippy Pictures & Letterbox Filmproduktion, Three)	
