= Maddigan's Quest =

- Genre: Fantasy drama
- Created by: Margaret Mahy
- Developed by: Rachel Lang; Gavin Strawhan
- Starring: Rose McIver; Jordan Metcalfe; Zac Fox; Olivia Tennet; Rawiri Pene; Danielle Cormack; Tim Balme; Rachel House; Hori Ahipene; Mark Nua; Peter Daube; Michael Hurst; Ben Cooper; Bronwyn Baker; Grace Brannigan
- Narrated by: Rose McIver
- Composer: Victoria Kelly
- Countries of origin: New Zealand; Australia; United Kingdom
- Original language: English
- No. of episodes: 13

Production
- Executive producers: John Barnett; Ewan Burnett; Elaine Sperber
- Producer: Simon Bennett
- Cinematography: Dale McCready
- Editors: Gary Hunt; Doug Dillaman
- Running time: 30 minutes
- Production companies: South Pacific Pictures; Burberry Productions

Original release
- Network: BBC1 (U.K.); Nine Network (A.U.); TV3 (N.Z.)
- Release: 26 January – 16 February 2006

Maddigan's Quest is a New Zealand fantasy-based television series set in a post-apocalyptic future. It was based on an original concept by Margaret Mahy and was developed for television by Rachel Lang and Gavin Strawhan. The show originally screened on BBC1 in the UK, and was also aired on TV3 in New Zealand and the Nine Network in Australia in early 2006.

== Storyline ==
Early in the 22nd century, the world underwent a vast and rapid change. The tectonic plates of the Earth began to shift and rapidly changed the face of the planet. Since then, the events of this time have grown to be known as the time of the Great Shift or the Great Chaos- and have become myth and legend. As a result of these events, the population of Earth severely dropped and little remained of the old ways. While some forms of old technology exist, the ways of man have receded. Slavery is not uncommon, bandits roam the highways.

Maddigan's Quest follows the circus troupe 'Maddigan's Fantasia', who come from the city of Solis, a beacon of freedom and peace for the desolate world. Each year, the Fantasia leave Solis to perform and earn a living, but this year is different: they have been set the task of obtaining a new Solar Converter to replace the existing converter–the only power source in Solis–which is failing. At the centre of this quest is 14-year-old Garland, the last member of the Maddigan family line.

Near the beginning of the Fantasia's journey, just after Ferdy Maddigan, the group's leader and Garland's father, is killed, two boys and their baby sister appear from the future. But while the younger brother, Eden, seems to be a blessing to the performers with his illusionary skills, his older brother Timon is hiding a dark secret which threatens the Fantasia, their mission, and the future of Solis itself.

== Cast and characters ==
=== Main ===
- Rose McIver as Garland
- Jordan Metcalfe as Timon
- Zac Fox as Eden
- Olivia Tennet as Lilith
- Rawiri Pene as Boomer
- Danielle Cormack as Maddie, Garland's mother
- Tim Balme as Yves
- Rachel House as Goneril
- Hori Ahipene as Tane
- Mark Nua as Bannister
- Peter Daube as Ozul
- Michael Hurst as Maska
- Ben Cooper as Nye
- Bronwyn Baker as Byrna
- Grace Brannigan as Jewel

=== Recurring ===
- Fleur Saville as Silver Girl
- Jack Campbell as Ferdy Maddigan, Garland's father
- Ross Duncan as The Nennog

=== Guest ===
- Geraldine Brophy as Ida
- Tandi Wright as Timon's mother
- Shane Cortese as Timon's father
- Patrick Wilson as Mayor of Gramth
- Alison Bruce as Witch finder
- Milo Cawthorne as Bolek
- Sara Wiseman as Morag
- Ilona Rodgers as Gabrielle
- John Leigh as Harold
- Reuben de Jong as Edgar
- Tom Hern as Birdboy leader

== Episodes ==
No.	Title	Directed by	Written by	Original release date
1	"Road Rats"	Charlie Haskell	Margaret Mahy, Gavin Strawhan and Rachel Lang	26 January 2006 (U.K); 11 February 2006 (N.Z)
2	"Hillfolk"	Charlie Haskell	Margaret Mahy, Rachel Lang and Gavin Strawhan	30 January 2006 (U.K); 18 February 2006 (N.Z)
3	"Gramth"	Geoffrey Cawthorn	Michael Bennett and Gavin Strawhan	31 January 2006 (U.K); 25 February 2006 (N.Z)
4	"Witch-Finder"	Peter Burger	Michael Bennett	1 February 2006 (U.K); 3 March 2006 (N.Z)
5	"Greentown"	Peter Burger	Rachel Lang	2 February 2006 (U.K); 10 March 2006 (N.Z)
6	"Plague"	Geoffrey Cawthorn	James Griffin	6 February 2006 (U.K); 17 March 2006 (N.Z)
7	"Newton"	Vanessa Alexander	James Griffin and Rachel Lang	7 February 2006 (U.K); 24 March 2006 (N.Z)
8	"Tunnellers"	Vanessa Alexander	Michael Bennett and James Griffin	8 February 2006 (U.K); 31 March 2006 (N.Z)
9	"Off the Map"	Charlie Haskell	Margaret Mahy, Rachel Lang and Gavin Strawhan	9 February 2006 (U.K); 7 April 2006 (N.Z)
10	"Birdboys"	Charlie Haskell	Gavin Strawhan	13 February 2006 (U.K); 14 April 2006 (N.Z)
11	"Pilgrim's Vantage"	Charlie Haskell	Rachel Lang and Gavin Strawhan	14 February 2006 (U.K); 21 April 2006 (N.Z)
12	"Laketown"	Peter Burger	Rachel Lang	15 February 2006 (U.K); 28 April 2006 (N.Z)
13	"Solis"	Peter Burger	Rachel Lang	16 February 2006 (U.K); 5 May 2006 (N.Z)

== Home releases ==
DVD releases
Season	Ep #	Release Date			
Season	Ep #	Region 1	Region 2	Region 3	Region 4
1	13	NA	7 August 2006	NA	7 December 2006

== Awards and nominations ==
=== Science Fiction and Fantasy Association of New Zealand ===
Year	Nominee	Award	Result	Ref
2007	Maddigan's Quest	Best Dramatic Presentation – Long Form Award	Won	

=== Screen Directors Guild of New Zealand ===
Year	Nominee	Award	Result	Ref
2007	Maddigan's Quest	Best Children's Programme	Won	
2007	Rose McIver	Performance by an Actress	Nominated	
2007	Jordan Metcalfe	Performance by an Actor	Nominated	
2007	Rachel Lang	Script, Drama	Nominated	
2007	Victoria Kelly	Achievement in Original Music	Won	
2007	Carl Smith, Rodney Larsen and Steve Finnegan	Contribution to a Soundtrack	Won	
2007	Tracey Collins	Contribution to Design	Won	
2007	Albedo VFX	Contribution to Design	Nominated	

== Book ==
Maddigan's Fantasia, later re-released under the title Maddigan's Quest, is a novel written by Margaret Mahy as a tie-in for the TV series (based on her concept).

The circus troupe Maddigan's Fantasia are on a mission to get a new solar converter from Newton for their hometown Solis. But on the way there, the Fantasia meet two strange boys, Timon and Eden. They are from the future and have come to help the Fantasia change history: in their timeline, when the Fantasia did not get back to Solis in time, the council gave up on them and took a new path, a radiation path. Timon and Eden's parents were killed because an evil monster called the Nennog rules Solis in the future and their parents tried to work out a way to change the past. They created a time slider, but they were killed for it, so Timon and Eden did the job for them and then they saved the Fantasia and Solis was saved.
