= 2007 Qantas Television Awards =

- Awarded for: Excellence in New Zealand television and television journalism
- Sponsored by: Qantas
- Date: November 24, 2006
- Location: Aotea Centre, Auckland
- Country: New Zealand
- Presented by: New Zealand Television Broadcasters Council
- Hosted by: Petra Bagust and Jason Gunn
- First award: 2005

Television/radio coverage
- Produced by: Glenn Sims

The 2007 Qantas Television Awards were presented on Saturday 24 November, in a ceremony at the Aotea Centre in Auckland, New Zealand, celebrating the year in New Zealand television and television media. The awards were hosted by television presenters Jason Gunn and Petra Bagust, with entertainment from the Auckland Philharmonia Orchestra, Evermore, Candy Lane and the Qantas Cure Kids Choir.

== Winners ==
The Qantas Television Awards were announced on Saturday 24 November 2007.

=== News and Current Affairs Winners ===
==== Best News ====
3 News (TV3)

==== Best News or Current Affairs Presenter ====
Mark Sainsbury, Close Up (TV One)

==== Best News Reporting ====
3 News "Benson Pope" (TV3)

==== Best Current Affairs Reporting for a Weekly Programme or One Off Current Affairs Special ====
Sunday "The Tiler's Tale" (TV One)

==== Best Current Affairs Reporting for a Daily Programme ====
Campbell Live "Spider" (TV3)

==== Best Current Affairs Series ====
60 Minutes "Episode 20" (TV3)

==== Investigation of the Year ====
3 News "Let us Spray" (TV3)

==== TV Journalist of the Year ====
Duncan Garner, 3 News (TV3)

=== News and Current Affairs Craft Winners ===
==== Best News Camera ====
Christopher Brown, One News (TV One)

==== Best Current Affairs Camera ====
Mike Dodd, Sunday (TV One)

==== Best News/Current Affairs Editing ====
Andrew Gibb, Sunday (TV One)

=== General Television Winners ===
==== Best Actor in a TV Drama ====
Antony Starr, Outrageous Fortune (TV3)

==== Best Actress in a TV Drama ====
Robyn Malcolm Outrageous Fortune (TV3)

==== Best Drama ====
Outrageous Fortune "Xmas Special" (TV3)

==== Best Script (non-factual) ====
James Griffin, Outrageous Fortune (TV3)

==== Best Director (drama) ====
Nathan Price, The Hothouse (TV One)

==== Best Arts/ Festival Documentary ====
Love, Speed and Loss (TV3)

==== Best Children's/Youth Programme ====
Let's Get Inventin - "Magic Gadget" (TV2)

==== Best Comedy ====
Pulp Sport "Episode 7" (TV3)

==== Best Entertainment ====
Dancing with the Stars "Episode 1" (TV One)

==== Best Information/ Lifestyle ====
Fair Go "Episode 3" (TV One)

==== Best Popular Documentary ====
The Time of our Lives (TV3)

==== Best Reality (format) ====
Marae DIY (Māori Television)

==== Best Sports or Event Coverage ====
The 32nd America's Cup "The Build-up & Race 1 Valencia" (TV One)

==== Best Observational Reality (non format) ====
Emergency "Episode 2" (TV One)

==== Best Director (non-drama) ====
Melanie Rakena, ICE (TV One)

=== General Television Craft Winners ===
==== Best Editing (factual) ====
Simon Coldrick, NZSAS: First Among Equals(TV3)

==== Best Camera (factual) ====
Jacob Bryant, Ends of the Earth (TV One)

==== Best Camera (non-factual) ====
Simon Baumfield, The Hothouse (TV One)

==== Best Editing (non-factual) ====
Bryan Shaw, Outrageous Fortune (TV3)

=== Woman's Day People's Choice Awards 2007 ===
==== Favourite NZ Female Personality ====
Robyn Malcolm

==== Favourite NZ Male Personality ====
Marc Ellis

==== Favourite NZ Show ====
Outrageous Fortune

==== Favourite International Show ====
Grey's Anatomy
