= 2021 New Zealand Television Awards =

- Awarded for: Excellence in New Zealand television
- Date: 1 March 2022
- Location: Online
- Country: New Zealand
- Hosted by: Tom Sainsbury

The New Zealand Television Awards for 2021 were presented on 1 March 2022. The ceremony was delayed from the original November 2021 date to March 2022 due to COVID event restrictions. It was eventually changed to an online event, virtually presented by Tom Sainsbury.

== Nominees and winners ==
Winners are listed first and highlighted in boldface.

Key
† – Non-technical award
‡ – Technical award

=== Television ===
NZ On Air Best Drama Series†	Best Factual Series†
**Creamerie – Bronwynn Bakker, Roseanne Liang, Perlina Lau, JJ Fong, Ally Xue & Tony Ayres (Kevin & Co and Flat 3 Productions, TVNZ 2)**; Black Hands – Philippa Rennie, Robin Scholes & Tina Archibald (Warner Bros. International Television Production New Zealand, TVNZ 1); Rūrangi – Craig Gainsborough, Max Currie, Cole Meyers, Melissa Nickerson & Tweedie Waititi (Autonomouse, Neon & NZME); The Gulf – Season 2 – Paula Boock, Philly de Lacey, Christian Friedrichs, Katrin Goetter, Henning Kamm & Donna Malane (The Gulf Productions, Three)	**Fight for the Wild – Peter Young, Tracey Roe & Dave Hansford (Fisheye Films, RNZ)**; Home, Land and Sea – Nicola Smith (Jack Media, Māori Television); Origins – Peter Bell, Tash Christie, Meg Douglas & Megan Tucker (Scottie Douglas Productions / Greenstone TV, TVNZ 1)
NZ On Air Best Documentary†	Best Original Reality Series†
**Loimata: The Sweetest Tears – Anna Marbrook, Jim Marbrook, Dr Tamasailau Suaalii-Sauni & Dame Gaylene Preston (Anna Marbrook Productions, Māori Television)**; Six Angry Women – Megan Jones, Jill Soper & Sam Blackley (Kindred Films, TVNZ 1); Heaven and Hell – The Centrepoint Story – Philippa Rennie & Natalie Malcon (Warner Bros. International Television Production New Zealand, TVNZ 1)	**David Lomas Investigates – Series 2 – David Lomas (Warner Bros. International Television Production New Zealand, Three)**; Popstars – Philly de Lacey, Tina McLaren, Jonathan Dowling, Tony Manson & Simon Fleming (Screentime New Zealand, TVNZ 2); Taranaki Hard – Charlotte Hobson, Ian Hart & Justin Hawkes (Workparty Ltd, Three)
Best Format Reality Series†	Best Current Affairs Programme†
**Match Fit – Series 1 – Bailey Mackey & Aaron Dolbel (Pango Productions, Three)**; National Treasures – Series 1 – Bailey Mackey & Kimberley Hurley (Pango Productions, TVNZ 1); The Apprentice Aotearoa – Jon Wild & Philip Smith (Great Southern Television Limited, TVNZ 1)	**The Hui – Annabelle Lee-Mather, Rewa Harriman, Mihingarangi Forbes & Philip Smith (Great Southern Television Limited and Aotearoa Media Collective, Three)**; Te Ao with Moana – Hikurangi Kimiora Jackson, Moana Maniapoto & Colin McRae (Māori Television); Seven Sharp – Paul Moor (TVNZ, TVNZ 1)
NZ On Air Best Children's Programme†	Te Māngai Pāho Best Māori Programme†
**Kiri and Lou – Fiona Copland (Stretchy Ltd, TVNZ 2)**; Mystic – Richard Fletcher & Simon Crawford-Collins (Libertine Pictures and Slim Film + Television, TVNZ 2); The New Legends of Monkey – Rachel Gardner, Jamie Laurenson, Hakan Kousetta, Emile Sherman, Iain Canning, Robin Scholes & Peter Andrikidis (See-Saw Films and Jump Film & Television, Netflix)	**The Hui – Annabelle Lee-Mather, Mihingarangi Forbes, Lillian Hanley & Philip Smith (Great Southern Television Limited and Aotearoa Media Collective, Three)**; Te Ao with Moana – Hikurangi Kimiora Jackson, Moana Maniapoto & Colin McRae (Māori Television); The Casketeers – Series 4 – Mahanga Pihama, Annabelle Lee-Mather & Philip Smith (Great Southern Television Limited, TVNZ 1); NZ Wars: Stories of Tainui – Mahanga Pihama, Mihingarangi Forbes, Annabelle Lee-Mather, Aotearoa Media Collective & Great Southern Television Limited (RNZ)
Te Māngai Pāho Best Reo Māori Programme†	NZ On Air Best Pasifika Programme†
**Rage Against the Rangatahi MMXX – Ngahuia Wade & Tina Wickliffe (Te Noni Ltd, Māori Television)**; Te Rongo Toa – Amanda Jones & Mana Epiha (Faultline Films, Māori Television); Waka Huia – Whatanui Flavell & Meg Douglas (Scottie Douglas Productions, TVNZ 1)	**Untold Pacific History – Lisa Taouma & Tuki Laumea (Tikilounge Productions, RNZ)**; Teine Sa: The Ancient One – Lisa Taouma, Maria Tanner & Karin Williams (Tikilounge Productions, Prime, Neon & The Coconet TV); Loimata: The Sweetest Tears – Anna Marbrook, Jim Marbrook, Dr Tamasailau Suaalii-Sauni & Dame Gaylene Preston (Anna Marbrook Productions, Māori Television); Brutal Lives – Mo'ui Faingata'a – Sandra Kailahi (Kingston Productions Ltd, The Coconet TV)
Best News Coverage†	Best Sports Programme†
**COVID-19 Testing – Michael Morrah – Angus Gillies & Kim Hurring (Newshub, Three)**; Newshub Leaders Debate – Jacinda Ardern v Judith Collins | Decision 2020 – Todd Symons, Sarah Bristow, Darryn Fouhy, Maryanne Ahern & Zac Fleming (Discovery, Three); 1 News – NZ Election 2020 – Jessica Mutch McKay (TVNZ, TVNZ 1)	**All Access: Aaron Smith – Paora Ratahi, Mark Malaki-Williams, Jack Mugford & Ross Karl (Sky Sport, Sky)**; Scratched: Aotearoa's Lost Sporting Legends – Series 2 – Amber Easby, Natalie Wilson, Duncan Greive, Scotty Stevenson, Madeleine Chapman & Eddy Fifield (Hex Work Productions, The Spinoff); Reforging the Steelers – Ra Pomare (RugbyPass / Sky Sport, Sky)
Best Live Event Coverage†	Best Comedy/Comedy Entertainment Programme†
**Aotearoa Music Awards 2020 – John McDonald & Charlotte Hobson (Discovery, Three)**; Auckland Dawn Service 2021 – Sean Murphy & Wayne Leonard (Māori Television); 36th America's Cup Match Day 7 – Leon Sefton (America's Cup Events, America's Cup website/YouTube)	**Wellington Paranormal – Season 3 – Paul Yates, Jemaine Clement & Taika Waititi (New Zealand Documentary Board Ltd, TVNZ 2)**; Educators – Series 2 – Rachel Jean, Kelly Martin, Andrew Szusterman & Sally Campbell (South Pacific Pictures, TVNZ OnDemand); Talkback – Mike Minogue, Jason Hoyte & Alexander Borgers (All Talk Productions and Righto Productions, TVNZ OnDemand)
Best Director: Documentary / Factual†	Screen Auckland Best Director: Drama†
**Natalie Malcon & Thomas Robins – Heaven and Hell – The Centrepoint Story (Warner Bros. International Television Production New Zealand, TVNZ 1)**; Anna Marbrook – Loimata: The Sweetest Tears (Anna Marbrook Productions, Māori Television); Irene Chapple – The Eruption: Stories of Survival (Pencil Productions, Three)	**Max Currie – Rūrangi (Autonomouse, Neon & NZME)**; David Stubbs – Black Hands (Warner Bros. International Television Production New Zealand, TVNZ 1); Peter Salmon – INSiDE (Luminous Beast, Prime & Neon); Roseanne Liang – Creamerie (Kevin & Co + Flat 3, TVNZ 2)
Best Actress†	Best Supporting Actress†
**Rima Te Wiata – The Tender Trap (Greenstone TV, TVNZ 1)**; Antonia Prebble – Westside – Series 6 (South Pacific Pictures, Three); Grace Palmer – Good Grief (Brown Sugar Apple Grunt Productions Ltd, TVNZ OnDemand)	**Alison Bruce – The Gulf – Season 2 (The Gulf Productions, Three)**; Kura Forrester – Educators – Series 2 (South Pacific Pictures, TVNZ OnDemand); Sophie Hambleton – Westside – Series 6 (South Pacific Pictures, Three)
Best Actor†	Best Supporting Actor†
**Joel Tobeck – Black Hands (Warner Bros. International Television Production New Zealand, TVNZ 1)**; Elz Carrad – Rūrangi (Autonomouse, Neon & NZME); Eds Eramiha – Vegas (Greenstone TV / 10,000 Co and Steambox Film Collective, TVNZ 2)	**Arlo Green – Rūrangi (Autonomouse, Neon & NZME)**; Rick Donald – Educators – Series 2 (South Pacific Pictures, TVNZ OnDemand); Dahnu Graham – Vegas (Greenstone TV / 10,000 Co and Steambox Film Collective, TVNZ 2)
Reporter of the Year†	Best Presenter: Entertainment†
**Michael Morrah – Newshub (Three)**; Mihingarangi Forbes – The Hui (Great Southern Television Limited and Aotearoa Media Collective, Three); Paula Penfold – Stuff Circuit (Stuff)	**Hayley Sproull – Have You Been Paying Attention? (TVNZ, TVNZ 2)**; Anika Moa – Anika Moa Reunited (Rogue Productions, TVNZ OnDemand); James McOnie – The Crowd Goes Wild (Sky Sport, Prime)
Best Presenter: News & Current Affairs†	Television Personality of the Year†
**Tova O'Brien – Newshub Nation (Discovery, Three)**; Jack Tame – Q+A with Jack Tame (TVNZ, TVNZ 1); Patrick Gower – Newshub (Discovery, Three); Simon Dallow – 1 News (TVNZ, TVNZ 1); Mihingarangi Forbes – The Hui (Great Southern Television Limited and Aotearoa Media Collective, Three)	**Nix Adams – Terei Tonight (Māori Television)**
New Zealand Television Legend†	
**Ian Mune**	

=== Craft awards ===
Best Editing: Documentary/Factual‡	Best Editing: Drama‡
**Simon Coldrick – Six Angry Women (Kindred Films, TVNZ 1)**; Bryan Shaw – Origins (Scottie Douglas Productions / Greenstone TV, TVNZ 1); Toby Longbottom – Deleted (Stuff Circuit, Stuff)	**Allanah Bazzard – Black Hands (Warner Bros. International Television Production New Zealand, TVNZ 1)**; Eric de Beus – The Gulf – Season 2 (The Gulf Productions, Three); Gretchen Peterson – The Gulf – Season 2 (The Gulf Productions, Three)
Best Camerawork: Documentary/Factual‡	Best Director: Multi Camera‡
**Phil Johnson – Emma (Stuff Circuit, Stuff)**; Mike Single – Colours of China (Making Movies, Choice TV); Peter Young – Fight for the Wild (Fisheye Films, RNZ)	**Wayne Leonard – 36th America's Cup Match 7 (America's Cup Events, America's Cup website/YouTube)**; Matt Barrett – Battle of Jacks Ridge (Sky Sport, Sky); Nigel Carpenter – Aotearoa Music Awards 2020 (Discovery, Three)
Best Cinematography: Drama‡	Best Contribution to a Soundtrack‡
**Dave Cameron NZCS ACS – Mystic (Libertine Pictures and Slim Film + Television, TVNZ 2)**; Marty Smith – Creamerie (Kevin & Co + Flat 3, TVNZ 2); Dave Cameron NZCS ACS – The Gulf – Season 2 (The Gulf Productions, Three); Rewa Harré – The Gulf – Season 2 (The Gulf Productions, Three)	**Ben Sinclair, Ray Beentjes, Chris Sinclair & Steve Finnigan – The Sounds (South Pacific Pictures / Shaftesbury, Neon)**; Ben Sinclair, Matt Stutter, Ray Beentjes & Steve Finnigan – Black Hands (Warner Bros. International Television Production New Zealand, TVNZ 1); Brendon Morrow, Greg Junovich, Jordan Smith & Gareth Van Niekerk – Six Angry Women (Kindred Films, TVNZ 1)
Images & Sound Best Original Score‡	Best Post Production Design‡
**Tom McLeod – Fight for the Wild (Fisheye Films, RNZ)**; Rhian Sheehan – The Sounds (South Pacific Pictures / Shaftesbury, Neon); Karl Steven – Black Hands (Warner Bros. International Television Production New Zealand, TVNZ 1)	**Paul Lear – Vegas (Greenstone TV / 10,000 Co and Steambox Film Collective, TVNZ 2)**; Alana Cotton – Black Hands (Warner Bros. International Television Production New Zealand, TVNZ 1); Aaron Clarke & Carl Budden – Heaven and Hell – The Centrepoint Story (Warner Bros. International Television Production New Zealand, TVNZ 1)
Best Production Design‡	Best Costume Design‡
**Miro Harré – The Gulf – Season 2 (The Gulf Productions, Three)**; Nick Williams – Black Hands (Warner Bros. International Television Production New Zealand, TVNZ 1); Adam Wheatley – Wellington Paranormal – Season 3 (New Zealand Documentary Board, TVNZ 2); Brett Schwieters & Riria Lee – Vegas (Greenstone TV, 10,000 Company & Steambox Film Collective, TVNZ 2)	**Liz McGregor – The New Legends of Monkey (See-Saw Films and Jump Film & Television, Netflix)**; Te Ura Taripo-Hoskins – Vegas (Greenstone TV, 10,000 Company & Steambox Film Collective, TVNZ 2); Tania Klouwens – Westside – Series 6 (South Pacific Pictures, Three)
Best Makeup Design‡	Best Script: Comedy‡
**Susie Glass – The New Legends of Monkey (See-Saw Films and Jump Film & Television, Netflix)**; Gabrielle Jones – Black Hands (Warner Bros. International Television Production New Zealand, TVNZ 1); Kevin Dufty – Westside – Series 6 (South Pacific Pictures, Three)	**Melanie Bracewell – Wellington Paranormal – Ep 306 "Fatberg" (New Zealand Documentary Board, TVNZ 2)**; Shoshana McCallum & Roseanne Liang – Creamerie (Kevin & Co + Flat 3, TVNZ 2); Jemaine Clement – Wellington Paranormal – Ep 302 "Te Maero" (New Zealand Documentary Board, TVNZ 2)
Best Script: Drama‡	
**Riwia Brown & Kathryn Burnett – The Tender Trap (Greenstone TV, TVNZ 1)**; Gavin Strawhan – Black Hands (Warner Bros. International Television Production New Zealand, TVNZ 1); Shoshana McCallum – INSiDE (Luminous Beast, Prime & Neon)	
