= 2023 New Zealand Television Awards =

- Awarded for: Excellence in New Zealand television
- Date: 5 December 2023
- Location: Auckland
- Country: New Zealand
- Hosted by: Kura Forrester

The New Zealand Television Awards for 2023 were held on 5 December 2023 at the Viaduct Events Centre in Auckland, New Zealand. Comedian Kura Forrester returned to host the event.

== Nominees and winners ==
Winners are listed first and highlighted in boldface.

Key
† – Non-technical award
‡ – Technical award

=== Television ===
NZ On Air Best Drama†	Best Comedy†
**The Gone (TVNZ 1 and TVNZ+)**; The Brokenwood Mysteries (TVNZ 1 and TVNZ+); Inky Pinky Ponky (Whakaata Māori / The Coconet)	**Educators: Season 3 Episode 1 (TVNZ+ and TVNZ 2)**; 7 Days: Season 15 Episode 18 (ThreeNow and Three); Not Even: Season 1 Episode 4 (Sky Open); Homebound 3.0: Season 1 Episode 1 (ThreeNow and Three)
Best Factual Series†	NZ On Air Best Documentary†
**When Bob Came: Season 1 (TVNZ+)**; Slash/Tairāwhiti (1News); Homesteads: Season 1 (Whakaata Māori)	**No Māori Allowed (TVNZ 1 and TVNZ+)**; Inside Child Poverty Revisited (ThreeNow and Three); Fire and Fury (Stuff)
Best Original Reality Series†	Best Format Reality Series†
**The Walkers: Season 2 Episode 3 (TVNZ 2 and TVNZ+)**; Unbreakable: Season 2 Episode 1 (TVNZ 1 and TVNZ+); Heartbreak Island: Season 3 Episode 12 (ThreeNow and Three)	**The Restaurant That Makes Mistakes (TVNZ 1 and TVNZ+)**; Match Fit – League Legends (ThreeNow and Three); The Dog House NZ (TVNZ 2 and TVNZ+)
Best Current Affairs Programme†	NZ On Air Best Children's Programme†
**Sunday (TVNZ 1 and TVNZ+)**; Paddy Gower Has Issues (ThreeNow and Three); Newsroom Investigates (Newsroom); Te Ao with Moana (Whakaata Māori)	**Mystic (TVNZ 2 and TVNZ+)**; Kiri and Lou (TVNZ 2 and TVNZ+); Panda and Kiwi (TVNZ+ and TVNZ 2)
Te Māngai Pāho Best Māori Programme†	Te Māngai Pāho Best Reo Māori Programme†
**NZ Wars, Stories of Wairau (RNZ)**; Te Ao with Moana (Whakaata Māori); The Hui (ThreeNow and Three); Homesteads (Whakaata Māori)	**Homesteads (Whakaata Māori)**; Rage Against The Rangatahi MMXXII (Whakaata Māori); Something For The People (Whakaata Māori Facebook & On Demand)
NZ On Air Best Pasifika Programme†	Best News Coverage†
**Brutal Lives – Mo'ui Faingata'a: Season 2 (The Coconet TV)**; Inky Pinky Ponky: Season 1 (The Coconet / Whakaata Māori); Duckrockers (TVNZ 2 and TVNZ+)	**1News – Cyclone Gabrielle (TVNZ 1)**; 1News – Auckland Flooding (TVNZ 1); Newshub – Cyclone Gabrielle hits the East Coast (ThreeNow and Three)
Best Sports Programme†	Best Live Event Coverage†
**East Coast Rising (TVNZ 2 and TVNZ+)**; The Crowd Goes Wild (Sky Sport); Scratched: Aotearoa's Lost Sporting Legends (The Spinoff)	**ANZAC 2023 (Whakaata Māori)**; Super Rugby Final 2023 (Sky Sport); Te Matatini Herenga Waka, Herenga Tangata – Final Day (TVNZ+ and TVNZ 2)
Best Entertainment Programme†	Best Director: Documentary/Factual†
**Taskmaster NZ (TVNZ 2 and TVNZ+)**; Ka Pō, Ka Ao Rob Ruha with the Auckland Philharmonia Orchestra (Whakaata Māori); Guy Montgomery's Guy-Mont Spelling Bee (ThreeNow and Three)	**Toby Longbottom – Fire and Fury (Stuff)**; Corinna Hunziker – No Māori Allowed (TVNZ 1 and TVNZ+); Kimiora Kaire-Melbourne – Homesteads (Whakaata Māori)
Screen Auckland Best Director: Drama / Comedy Drama†	Best Actress†
**Kiel McNaughton – Princess of Chaos (TVNZ 2 and TVNZ+)**; Jesse Griffin – Educators (TVNZ+ and TVNZ 2); Roberto Nascimento – Sui Generis (OUTtv)	**Antonia Prebble – Double Parked (ThreeNow and Three)**; Madeleine Sami – Double Parked (ThreeNow and Three); Amanaki Prescott-Faletau – Inky Pinky Ponky (The Coconet / Whakaata Māori)
Best Supporting Actress†	Best Actor†
**Sesilia Pusiaki – Inky Pinky Ponky (The Coconet / Whakaata Māori)**; Katlyn Wong – Princess of Chaos (TVNZ 2 and TVNZ+); Michelle Fairley – The Gone (TVNZ 1 and TVNZ+)	**Dominic Ona-Ariki – One Lane Bridge (TVNZ 1 and TVNZ+)**; Richard Flood – The Gone (TVNZ 1 and TVNZ+); Neill Rea – The Brokenwood Mysteries (TVNZ 1 and TVNZ+)
Best Supporting Actor†	Reporter of the Year†
**Rick Donald – Educators (TVNZ+ and TVNZ 2)**; Scotty Cotter – Kura (TVNZ+ and TVNZ 2); Scotty Cotter – Not Even (Sky Open)	**Thomas Mead – 1 News (TVNZ 1 and TVNZ+)**; Mark Crysell – Sunday (TVNZ 1 and TVNZ+); Lisette Reymer – Newshub Live at 6 (ThreeNow and Three)
Best Presenter: Entertainment†	Best Presenter: News and Current Affairs†
**Karen O'Leary – Paddy Gower Has Issues (ThreeNow and Three)**; Sonia Gray – Kids Wired Differently (TVNZ 1 and TVNZ+); Alice Snedden – Alice Snedden's Bad News (The Spinoff)	**Patrick Gower – Newshub Live at 6pm, Paddy Gower Has Issues, AM, The Project NZ (ThreeNow and Three)**; Jack Tame – Q+A with Jack Tame (TVNZ 1 and TVNZ+); Jenny May-Clarkson – Breakfast (TVNZ 1 and TVNZ+)
Best Editing: Documentary or Factual‡	Best Editing: Drama / Comedy Drama‡
**Toby Longbottom – Fire and Fury (Stuff)**; Cushla Dillon – No Māori Allowed (TVNZ 1 and TVNZ+); Emma Patterson – Kids Wired Differently (TVNZ 1 and TVNZ+)	**Carly Turner – Princess of Chaos (TVNZ 2 and TVNZ+)**; Jonno Woodford-Robinson – One Lane Bridge (TVNZ 1 and TVNZ+); Rhys Green, Lachlan Wilson & Ben Winter – Double Parked (ThreeNow and Three)
Best Camerawork: Documentary or Factual‡	Best Director: Multi Camera‡
**Kina Scollay & Alex Hubert – Our Big Blue Backyard – Snares Island (TVNZ 1 and TVNZ+)**; Dominic Fryer – No Māori Allowed (TVNZ 1 and TVNZ+); Phil Johnson – Fire and Fury (Stuff)	**Steve Jamieson – Rugby World Cup 2023 Final (ThreeNow, Three & Spark)**; Matt Quin – Warriors Returning Home 2022 (Sky Sport); Mitchell Hawkes – Topp Class (Sky Open)
Images & Sound Best Cinematography: Drama / Comedy Drama‡	Best Contribution to a Soundtrack‡
**Dave Cameron NZCS ACS – The Gone: Season 1, Episode 2 (TVNZ 1 and TVNZ+)**; Andrew Stroud – One Lane Bridge: Season 3, Episode 5 (TVNZ 1 and TVNZ+); Tim Fleming ISC – The Gone: Season 1, Episode 5 (TVNZ 1 and TVNZ+)	**Ben Sinclair, Buster Flaws, Travis Heffernen, Steve Finnigan & Joel Haines – The Brokenwood Mysteries: Season 8, Episode 2 (TVNZ 1 and TVNZ+)**; Tom Miskin, Melanie Graham, Mike Bayliss & Steve Finnigan – Mystic: Season 3, Episode 8 (TVNZ 2 and TVNZ+); Tom Miskin, Mike Bayliss, Alan Kidd & Steve Finnigan – One Lane Bridge: Season 3, Episode 1 (TVNZ 1 and TVNZ+)
Images & Sound Best Original Score‡	Best Post Production Design‡
**Mahuia Bridgman-Cooper – The Gone: Season 1, Episode 4 (TVNZ 1 and TVNZ+)**; Riki Gooch – The Untold Tales of Tūteremoana (Whakaata Māori); Claire Cowan – One Lane Bridge: Series 3, Episode 5 (TVNZ 1 and TVNZ+); Claire Cowan – Under the Vines: Season 2 (TVNZ 1 and TVNZ+)	**Alana Cotton – Princess of Chaos (TVNZ 2 and TVNZ+)**; Mikee Carpinter – Patrick Gower on Cyber Crime (ThreeNow and Three); Alana Cotton – One Lane Bridge: Season 3 (TVNZ 1 and TVNZ+)
Best Production Design‡	Best Costume Design‡
**John Allan – One Lane Bridge (TVNZ 1 and TVNZ+)**; Shayne Radford – The Gone (TVNZ 1 and TVNZ+); Ken Turner – Under The Vines (TVNZ 1 and TVNZ+)	**Pauline H Pohatu – The Gone (TVNZ 1 and TVNZ+)**; Tania Klouwens – Duckrockers (TVNZ 2 and TVNZ+); Feeonaa Clifton & Ani O'Neill – The Untold Tales of Tūteremoana (Whakaata Māori)
Best Makeup Design‡	Best Script: Comedy†
**Kelly Mitchell – The Gone (TVNZ 1 and TVNZ+)**; Catherine Maguire – Under The Vines (TVNZ 1 and TVNZ+); Kelly Mitchell – One Lane Bridge (TVNZ 1 and TVNZ+)	**Dana Leaming – Not Even: Season 1, Episode 4 (Sky Open)**; Vince McMillan & James Watson – Kura: Season 3, Episode 3 (TVNZ+ and TVNZ 2); Chris Parker – Double Parked: Season 1, Episode 2 (ThreeNow and Three)
Best Script: Drama†	
**Jessica Joy Wood – Shortland Street: Season 32, Episodes 7714, 7715, 7716 (TVNZ 2 and TVNZ+)**; Ally Xue & Fiona Samuel – Princess of Chaos (TVNZ 2 and TVNZ+); Amanaki Prescott-Faletau & Leki Jackson-Bourke – Inky Pinky Ponky (The Coconet / Whakaata Māori)	

=== Special awards ===
Television Personality of the Year†	NZTV Legend†
**Aesha Scott – Below Deck Down Under (Bravo / Hayu NZ)**	**Oscar Kightley**
