= Screen Directors Guild of New Zealand =

DEGANZ
- Directors and Editors Guild of Aotearoa New Zealand
- Founded: 1995
- Headquarters: Level 2, 66 Surrey Crescent; Auckland, New Zealand
- Location: New Zealand
- Key people: Robyn Paterson, President Tui Ruwhiu, Executive Director
- Website: www.degnz.co.nz

The Directors and Editors Guild of Aotearoa New Zealand (DEGANZ) is a screen-sector trade union that represents the interests of directors and editors within New Zealand's screen and motion picture industry. Initially known as the Screen Directors Guild of New Zealand (SDGNZ), it was founded in 1995 when 18 New Zealand (NZ) directors gathered together at an annual industry conference in Wellington to discuss directors' conditions of work and the need for an organization to represent their interests independent of the Screen Production and Development Association (SPADA), which had evolved from the original concept of a guild that represented both producers and directors.

== Overview ==
The Directors and Editors Guild of Aotearoa New Zealand was previously a registered Incorporated society. It seeks to maintain a forum where directors and editors can define, defend and further their professional industry. The Guild has a membership of approximately 200 directors and editors, many of whom are internationally recognized New Zealand Directors. Sir Peter Robert Jackson has been a member since 1999.

Key initiatives and responsibilities of the Guild include lobbying for improved labour standards within the New Zealand screen and motion picture industry and the organization of training programs for Guild members to engage with directors/editors and mentors within the industry. DEGANZ also provides networking opportunities, legal advice, services and concessions, and immigration advice for its members and practitioners in the wider industry.

The Guild was not always representative of editors in New Zealand. However, in 2009 an emergence of editors identified the need for representation and were welcomed as members.

DEGANZ operates from an office headquarters in Auckland, New Zealand but hosts initiatives and events in other major cities around New Zealand.

== Awards ==
Following the end of the New Zealand Film and Television Awards (1986-2003), the SDGNZ created the New Zealand Screen Awards, an annual awards ceremony honouring the New Zealand film industry. The New Zealand Screen Awards ran from 2005-2007 before merging with the Qantas Television Awards in 2008 and were renamed the Qantas Film and Television Awards. These were subsequently renamed the Aotearoa Film and Television Awards (AFTA) in 2011.

In 2012 the SDGNZ announced that, due to funding and resource restraints, it would not be involved with the AFTAs in 2012, nor would it run a separate film awards.

== Publications ==
For a period of some years the Guild regularly published a quarterly magazine, Take, featuring news, interviews, events and humour of particular interest to the New Zealand screen and motion picture industry.

== Presidents of the Directors and Editors Guild of Aotearoa New Zealand ==
- Keith Hunter (1996–2000)
- John Reid (2000–2003)
- Dan Salmon (2003–2006)
- Annie Goldson (2006–2009)
- Peter Bell (2009–2013)
- Peter Roberts (2013–2016)
- Howard Taylor (2016–2021)
- Robyn Paterson (2021-present)
