= Jordan Metcalfe =

English actor

- Born: 24 May 1986 (age 40); Anlaby, East Riding of Yorkshire, England
- Occupation: Actor
- Years active: 2002-Present

Jordan Metcalfe (born 24 May 1986) is an English actor.

Metcalfe has appeared as Jake in The Queen's Nose in 2003. He has played the roles of Chris Travis in Heartbeat, and Kieran Tyler in Tea with Betty, Afternoon Play in 2006. He also played 'Mould' in Fungus the Bogeyman (2004), the character 'Chip' in My Parents Are Aliens in 2006, Young Garstin in These Foolish Things (2006), Lightfoot in the documentary The Iceman Murder (2005), John Chappel Jr. in the drama-documentary The Last Flight To Kuwait, Byron in Ultimate Force, Wayne in Jacqueline Wilson's Girls In Love and Brian in Misfits. 2019 saw Metcalfe join the cast of Father Brown on BBC1 afternoons.

Other notable appearances include Timon in Maddigan's Quest and Oliver in Neil Bartlett's acclaimed production of Oliver Twist at the Lyric Theatre, Hammersmith in 2004. He also played the roles of Jack in The Dreaming, and Young Katurian in The Pillowman. In 2026, he plays Edward Gordon Craig in Grace Pervades at the Theatre Royal, Haymarket.

== Filmography ==
=== Film ===
Year	Title	Role	Notes
2005	These Foolish Things	Garstin at 14	with Lauren Bacall and Terence Stamp
2014	Pride	Charlie	
2017	Fractured	Freyr	
2024	Ladies First	Marlon	with Sacha Baron Cohen

=== Television ===
Year	Title	Role	Notes
2003	The Queen's Nose	Jake	Main role
2004	Fungus the Bogeyman	Mould	TV series
2005	The Iceman Murder	Lightfoot	TV film
2005	Girls in Love	Wayne	Episode: "True Romance"
2005	The Last Detective	Receptionist	Episode: "Towpaths of Glory"
2006	The Afternoon Play	Kieran Tyler	Episode: "Tea with Betty"
2006	Maddigan's Quest	Timon	Main role
2006–2010	Genie in the House	Adil	Main role
2006	Ultimate Force	Byron	Episode: "Violent Solutions"
2006	My Parents Are Aliens	Chip	Episode: "Abandon Chip"
2006	Heartbeat	Chris Travis	Episode: "Memoirs of a Fighting Man"
2010	Misfits	Brian	Episode Finale: "Season 2"
2014	Tommy Cooper: Not Like That, Like This	Les Dennis	TV film
2019	Father Brown	Jamie Cheeseman	Episode: "The Passing Bell"

=== Theatre ===
Title	Role	Notes
Peter Pan	Nibs	Royal Festival Hall
The Dreaming	Jack	Royal Opera House
Oliver Twist	Oliver	Lyric Hammersmith
The Pillowman	Young Katurian	National Theatre
Wendy and Peter Pan	Michael	Royal Shakespeare Company – Strafford-upon-Avon
Hobson's Choice	Albert Prosser	Regents Park
The Hypochondriac	Clèante	Theatre Royal Bath
The Hypocrite	James, Duke of York	Royal Shakespeare Company
The Winter's Tale	The Clown	Shakespeare's Globe Theatre
The Comedy of Errors	Dromio of Syracuse	Shakespeare's Globe Theatre
Jack Absolute Flies Again	Roy Faulkland	National Theatre
Accidental Death of an Anarchist	D. I. Daisy	Lyric Hammersmith
Cold War	Michel	Almeida Theatre
Love's Labour's Lost	Boyét	Royal Shakespeare Company
Coriolanus	Brutus	National Theatre
Grace Pervades	Edward Gordon Craig	Theatre Royal, Bath; Theatre Royal Haymarket
