= Andrew Shaw (businessman) =

Businessman

Andrew Shaw is the president and CEO of the Toronto Symphony Orchestra. In 2011 he was awarded the Strategic Perspectives in Nonprofit Management (SPNM) Scholarship in recognition of being one of Toronto's non-profit leaders.

Shaw graduated from Queen's University in 1974 with a Bachelor of Music; the University of Western Ontario in 1977 with a Master of Music; and from the University of Toronto's Rotman School of Management in 1985 with a Master of Business Administration.
