= Andrew Shaw (television executive) =

New Zealand television producer (1957–2025)

- Born: 1957; Manchester, England
- Died: 24 May 2025 (aged 68)
- Years active: 1974–2023

Andrew Shaw (1957 – 24 May 2025) was a New Zealand television executive, broadcaster and presenter.

== Early life ==
Shaw was born in 1957 in Manchester. The family moved to New Zealand while he was still at school. His father was Barry Shaw, who worked for The New Zealand Herald as a television critic.

== Career ==
During the 1970s, Shaw had been working in a factory job. He saw a job opening that was available for a television children's presenter. With getting the job, Shaw made his debut on TV2 presents Andy which debuted in 1975. This show then changed its title to Here's Andy then to Hey Hey It's Andy.

In 1978, Shaw began his debut as a television director for A Drop of Kulcha. He continued to be a presenter for Star Zone in 1978.

From 1979, Shaw was a director for the show Radio with Pictures which ran until 1991. In 1980, Shaw became a director and producer of the entertainment programming for TVNZ. He then went on to produce the original New Zealand Telethon as well as the competitive sports reality series, Clash of the Codes in 1993.

In 2001, Shaw left TVNZ to then become the Chief Operating Officer for the production company South Pacific Pictures. This helped with the development of New Zealand Idol which aired from 2004 until 2006.

In 2007, Shaw went back to TVNZ where he returned as General Manager of Commissioning, Production and Acquisitions. He then later became the Deputy Director of Content for TVNZ.

In 2020, Shaw left TVNZ. Shaw joined the board for NZ On Air in 2022. In November 2023 Shaw resigned after comments he shared publicly criticising the newly appointed Deputy New Zealand Prime Minister Winston Peters who was sworn in the previous day. Shaw later apologised for his comments.

=== Awards ===
In 2020, Shaw received the award for Television legend at the NZ Television awards. In 2024, the New Zealand screen production and development association (Spada) recognised him as an "Industry Champion".

== Private life ==
Shaw was married with four children. He died on 24 May 2025 after a long battle with cancer at the age of 68.
