= Mike McRoberts =

New Zealand journalist

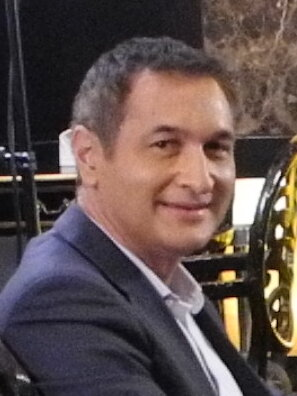
- McRoberts in 2012
- Born: 1966 (age 59–60); Dunedin, New Zealand
- Citizenship: New Zealand
- Employer: National Business Review

Mike McRoberts (born 1966) is a New Zealand television journalist and news anchor. He presented Newshub Live at 6pm on Three from 2005 until its last broadcast on 5 July 2024. McRoberts is the Te Ao Māori Editor at the National Business Review

== Early life ==
McRoberts was born in 1966 to a Ngāti Kahungunu father and Pākehā mother. The 2000 documentary White Sheep, written and produced by McRoberts, tells the story of Māori men like McRoberts' father who moved to Christchurch from Wairoa as teenagers in the 1950s and 1960s.

He attended Manning Intermediate and Hillmorton High School in Christchurch. He completed a journalism diploma from the New Zealand Broadcasting School at CPIT (now Ara Institute of Canterbury) in 1986.

McRoberts grew up unable to speak Māori, as detailed in the 2022 documentary Kia Ora, Good Evening.

== Career ==
=== Journalism career ===
McRoberts began his career in 1984 as a cadet at Radio New Zealand. He became a sports reporter for TVNZ in 1995 before moving to current affairs with the Holmes programme in 1998.

He moved to rival network TV3 as a reporter in 2001 and began a presenting role the following year as host of 60 Minutes, which he held until 2012.

In March 2005 McRoberts and journalist Hilary Barry were appointed as newsreaders for the flagship 6pm bulletin then titled 3 News (later Newshub). He has continued to report for the network and has covered conflicts in Afghanistan, Iraq, Lebanon, Gaza, East Timor and Solomon Islands as well as national disasters including the 2010 Haiti earthquake, the 2011 Tōhoku earthquake and tsunami and the Canterbury earthquakes in 2010 and 2011.

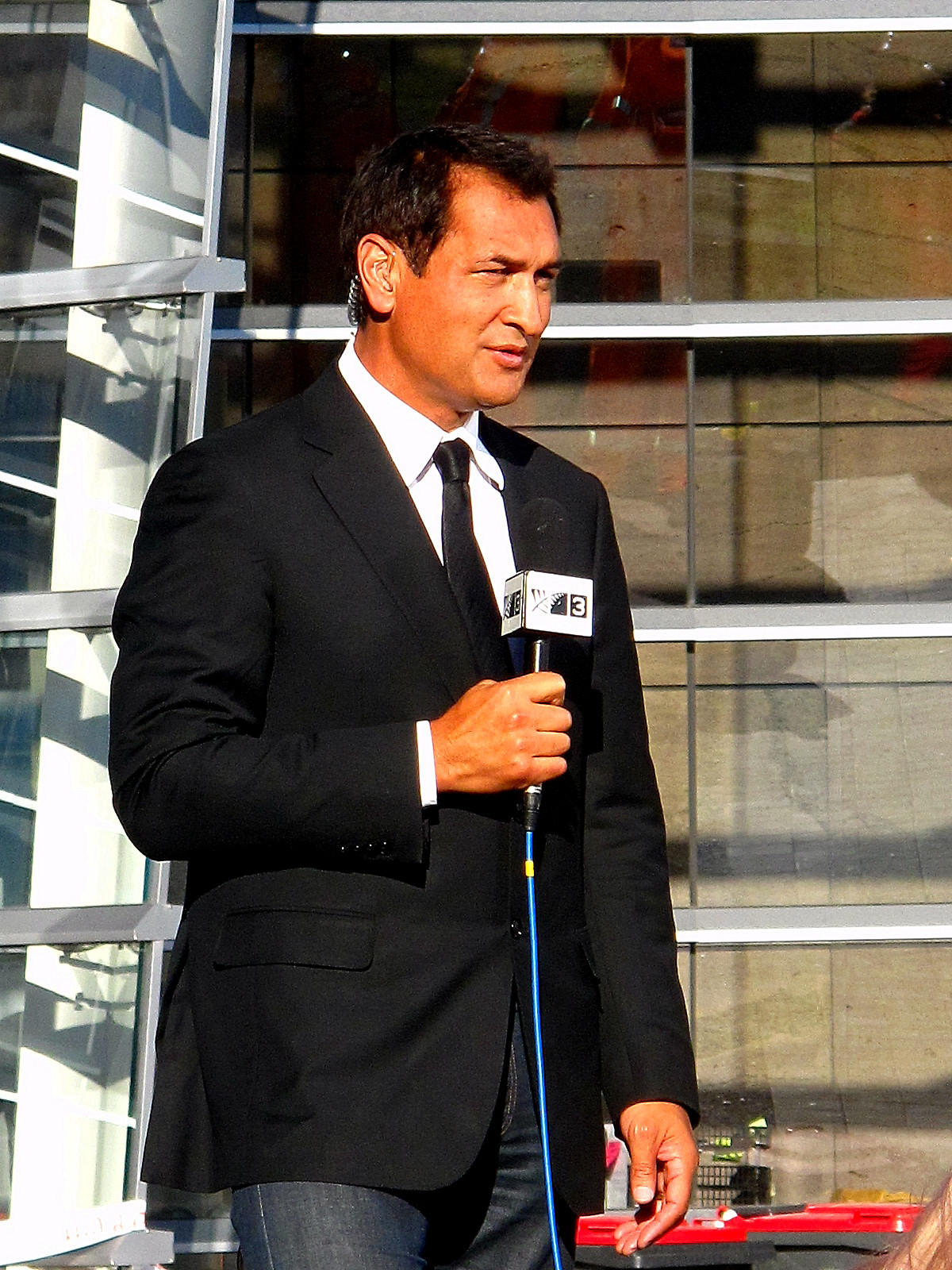
McRoberts reporting from Christchurch in 2011

In May 2012, McRoberts became the anchor of TV3's new current affairs show Three 60 focusing on international news, politics, and business. The show continued into 2013 but was eventually cancelled.

In April 2024, following Warner Bros. Discovery's decision to close Newshub, McRoberts announced he would retire from news broadcasting. He co-anchored the final broadcast on 5 July 2024. In early May, the National Business Review confirmed that McRoberts would be taking up position as Te Ao Māori Editor, focusing on stories about Māori economic development in New Zealand. He presented the Radio New Zealand podcast series RNZ100: A Century of Stories, marking the state broadcaster's 100th anniversary.

=== Reality television appearances ===
In 2019, McRoberts was a contestant on the eighth season of Dancing with the Stars. He was the fourth contestant to be eliminated.

McRoberts appeared on the first season of The Masked Singer NZ as "Orange Roughy" in 2021. He was eliminated in the fifth episode after three appearances.

== Personal life ==
McRoberts married journalist Paula Penfold in 1995. The couple share two children, Ben and Maia, and separated in 2017. McRoberts married publicist Heidi Ettema in 2023.

McRoberts won TV Journalist of the Year at the Qantas Television Awards in 2006 and Best Presenter at the New Zealand Television Awards in 2017 and 2018.

McRoberts published his memoir Beyond the Front Line in October 2011.

== See also ==
- List of New Zealand television personalities
