= Paula Penfold =

New Zealand journalist (born 1968 or 1969)

Paula Penfold (born 1968 or 1969) is a New Zealand investigative journalist. She is best known for her investigation into the wrongful conviction of Auckland man Teina Pora for murder and rape.

== Career ==
Penfold began her career in radio, working for Radio New Zealand and The Radio Network for eight years, before moving into television with TVNZ in 1998.

She then moved to TV3 in 2003 and spent the next 13 years working in current affairs across 60 Minutes, 3rd Degree and 3D. At 3D she spent three years investigating the wrongful conviction of Teina Pora, who spent 21 years in jail for the rape and murder of Auckland woman Susan Burdett in 1994. Her stories contributed significantly to the eventual quashing of his conviction and a $2.5 million payout from the Crown.

3D was cancelled by TV3 in 2016 and Penfold moved to Fairfax, establishing the long-form documentary investigative unit Stuff Circuit with two of her former colleagues. She was named 'Reporter of the Year' at the 2019 New Zealand Television Awards.

== Stuff Circuit documentaries ==
- Big Decision (2019)
- Alias (2020)
- False Profit (2020)
- Emma (2020)
- Deleted (2021)

== Personal life ==
Penfold is the daughter of Shirley Penfold, a draughtswoman, and Peter Penfold. She was married to TV3 anchor and journalist Mike McRoberts for more than 20 years. They split in 2018 and have two children together.
