= User Friendly (disambiguation) =

User Friendly is a webcomic.

User Friendly may also refer to:

- Usability, the ease of using a given object
- User Friendly (horse), a British Thoroughbred racehorse
- User Friendly, a short story collection by Spider Robinson
- "User Friendly", a song by Marilyn Manson on the album Mechanical Animals
- "User-Friendly", a song by Ian Anderson on the album Walk into Light
- User Friendly (film), a 1990 New Zealand film
