= Hokitika Wildfoods Festival =

Annual food festival in Hokitika, New Zealand

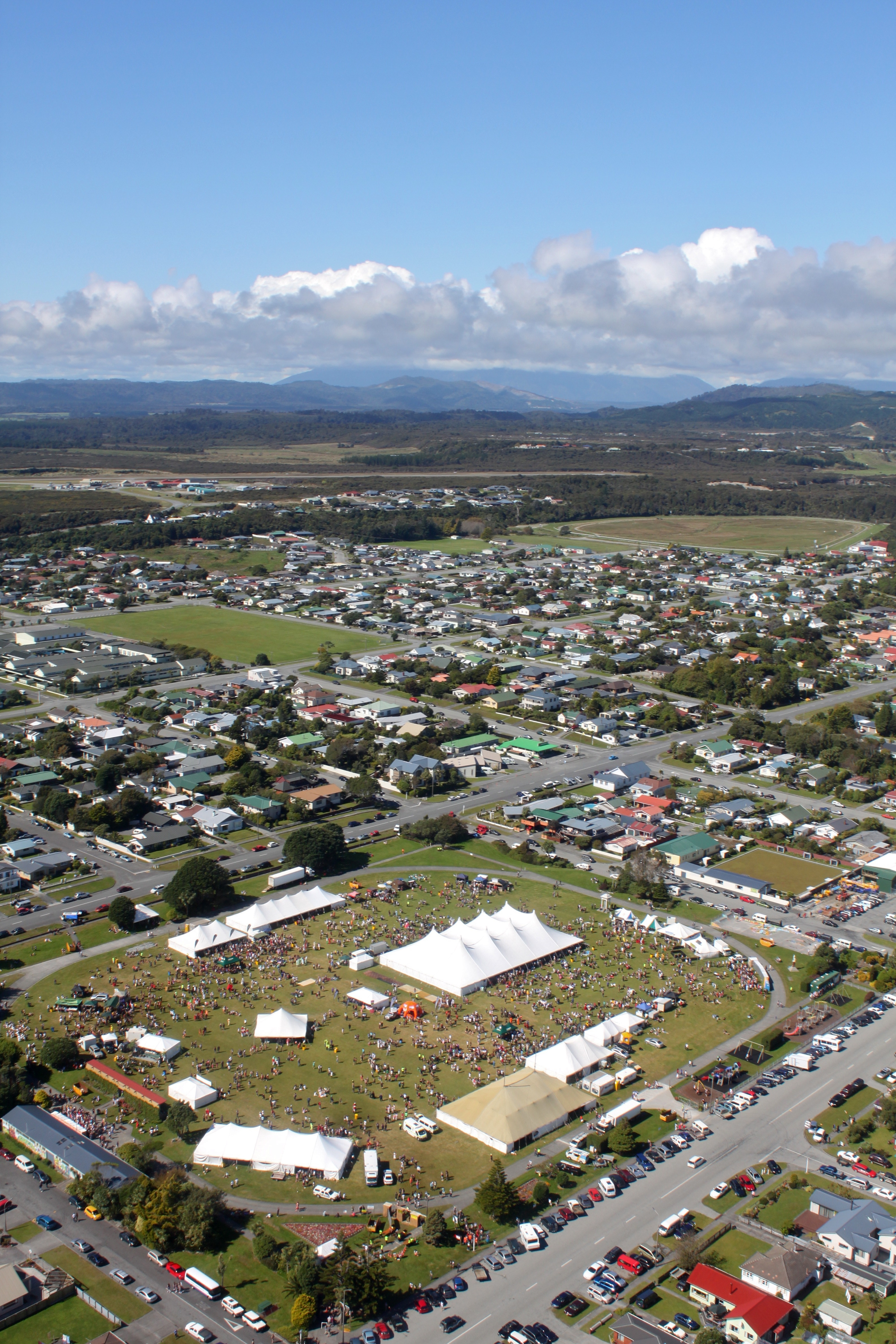
2011 Wildfoods Festival in Cass Square, Hokitika

The Hokitika Wildfoods Festival is an annual event held in early March in Hokitika, New Zealand. Its main attraction is an array of unusual foods, including huhu grubs, lamb's testicles, and horse semen.

== Origin ==
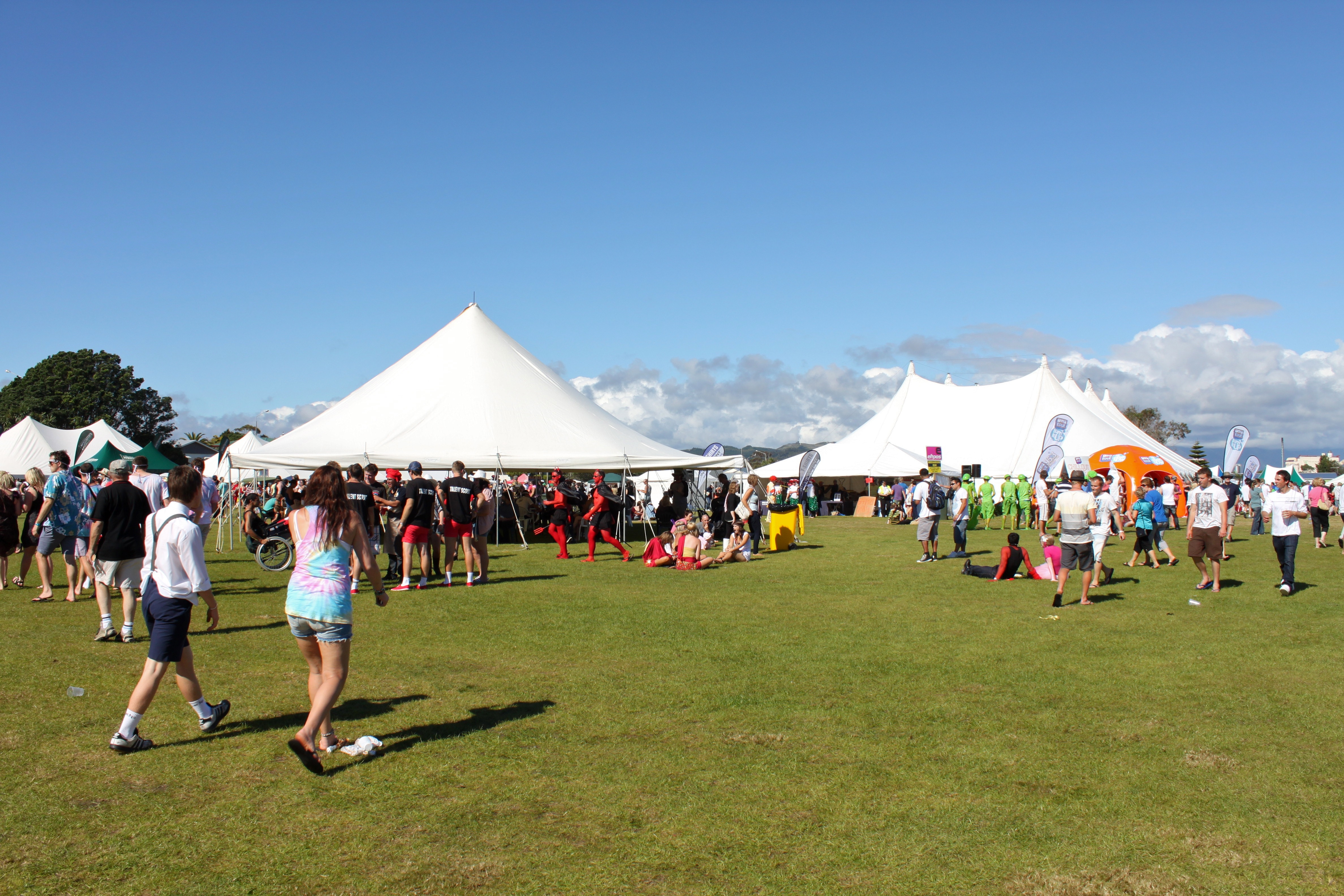
2011 festival, Cass Square

The Wildfoods festival was started in 1990 by Hokitika local Claire Bryant, a producer of gorse-flower and rose-petal wine, who wanted to celebrate the flavours and produce of the West Coast. The first festival in March 1990 coincided with Hokitika's 125th anniversary and was run by Heritage Hokitika. It took place in a newly-developed heritage area on Gibson Quay in downtown Hokitika. The first Wildfoods had 30 stalls, and attracted 1800 people. Alison Holst was the celebrity judge.

Wildfoods has traditionally been run on the second Saturday in March, the driest time on the West Coast. The weather has generally been fine, but in the third festival in 1992 a squall blew down the festival tent. By that year visitor numbers had increased to 3,800, so in 1993 Wildfoods moved to its current venue of Cass Square, which has a capacity of 10,000. In 1994 for the first time the festival was opened by the West Coast Member of Parliament, Damien O'Connor, rather than the Mayor of Westland. One councillor decried the involvement of a "foreigner" as "propaganda by the Labour Party".

== Management ==
The 1991 and 1992 festivals had been run by the South Westland Community Activities Trust, but Westland District Council took over the operation of the fourth festival in 1993. Mike Keenan was appointed as festival coordinator, assisted by Lance Rae and a voluntary festival committee (numbering 17 by 2005). The use of festival currency stopped after 1994, and by 1995 the event, sponsored by Monteith's, had expanded to cover Cass Square. By the next year the festival had reached its peak number of 90 different stalls. Westpower, the other major sponsor since 1990, was taken over by Trustpower in 1999.

Event Attendance
Number	Year	Numbers	Stalls	Profit/loss
1	1990	1,800	30	
2	1991	2,000	37	
3	1992	3,800		
4	1993	6,500		
5	1994	7,840		
6	1995	8,527		
7	1996	11,000	90	
8	1997	13,500		
9	1998	14,600		
10	1999	14,300		
11	2000	16,140		
12	2001	19,200		
13	2002	20,663		$90,624
14	2003	22,466	90	$85,225
21	2010	13,500	80+	
22	2011	10,436	65	
23	2012	10,800	53	
24	2013	8,500		-$68,000
25	2014	c. 6,300	43	-$81,042
26	2015	5,345		
27	2016	6,620	50	$19,305
28	2017	< 6,700	51	$12,000
29	2018	8,000	50	-$53,612
30	2019	10,000	50+	$20,000
31	2020	7,000		
32	2021	> 9,000		
—	2022	postponed		

By 2003, after ten years of steady growth, Wildfoods Festival attendance peaked at 22,500 (Hokitika at the time had a population of just 3,500). That year over 100 of whitebait and 19,000 litres of beer were sold. Over half the visitors came from Canterbury (and 81 per cent from the South Island), only 2 per cent from Auckland, and 9 per cent from overseas. At its height the festival attracted 25,000 under-age revellers, who smashed windows, lit bonfires on the beach, and left litter over central Hokitika; 20 were arrested, and there were calls for Wildfoods to be cancelled. Subsequently ticket sales were capped at 15,000, and a liquor ban was introduced downtown, with all alcohol being sold in plastic cups. Sixty-eight arrests were made in 2012 for breaching the liquor ban (although none were at the festival site), but in recent years arrests for disorderly behaviour were lower: fifteen in 2016, eight in 2017.

In 2005 the Wildfoods Festival received a New Zealand Tourism Award in the Innovation category.

A 2012 study by BERL estimated the benefit of Wildfoods to the West Coast region as $6.5 million a year. The festival boosted accommodation nights in Hokitika at the end of the summer; before the recent explosion of Airbnb numbers in Hokitika, there was limited hotel/motel accommodation in Hokitika (approximately 600 people in 2003), and many residents rented out private rooms to host the influx of tourists. Ten years after the last survey, over a quarter of the festival attendees now came from the North Island, 11 per cent were from Auckland, and 5 per cent from overseas. Ninety per cent (9,700) were from outside the West Coast region, an unusually high proportion for a national festival. The largest visitor age group was 21–29 year olds. Each visitor stayed an average of 2.5 days and spent on average $540. Around 60 community groups ran stalls or provide services to the festival for fund-raising purposes, raising over $110,000; the kitchen of the Karamea Community Hall, for example, was refurbished with the proceeds of their stall. The festival was estimated to create 47 full-time-equivalent jobs.

In 2016, after five years of losses, the festival again made a profit. The festival had cut expenses by $120,000, reintroduced a pre-party at Hokitika Beach, and revived the after-party that had been cancelled in the preceding two years. The Westland District Council had continued to run the festival, despite losses, because of the economic benefit it provided to local businesses and the community.

After being organised by the Westland District Council for 29 years, Wildfoods was outsourced in 2019 to publicly-owned and Council-controlled organisation Destination Westland, who after some contention over whether the festival was a good financial risk have continued to run it.

Mike Keenan ran the Wildfoods Festival for 21 years but was made redundant in 2014 when the Council disestablished its events department. Subsequent managers were Ashley Cassin (2016), Sarah Brown (2018), and Amber Popaite of Destination Westland (2019).

In 2022 the Festival was postponed until the following year because of the COVID-19 pandemic in New Zealand.

== Food ==
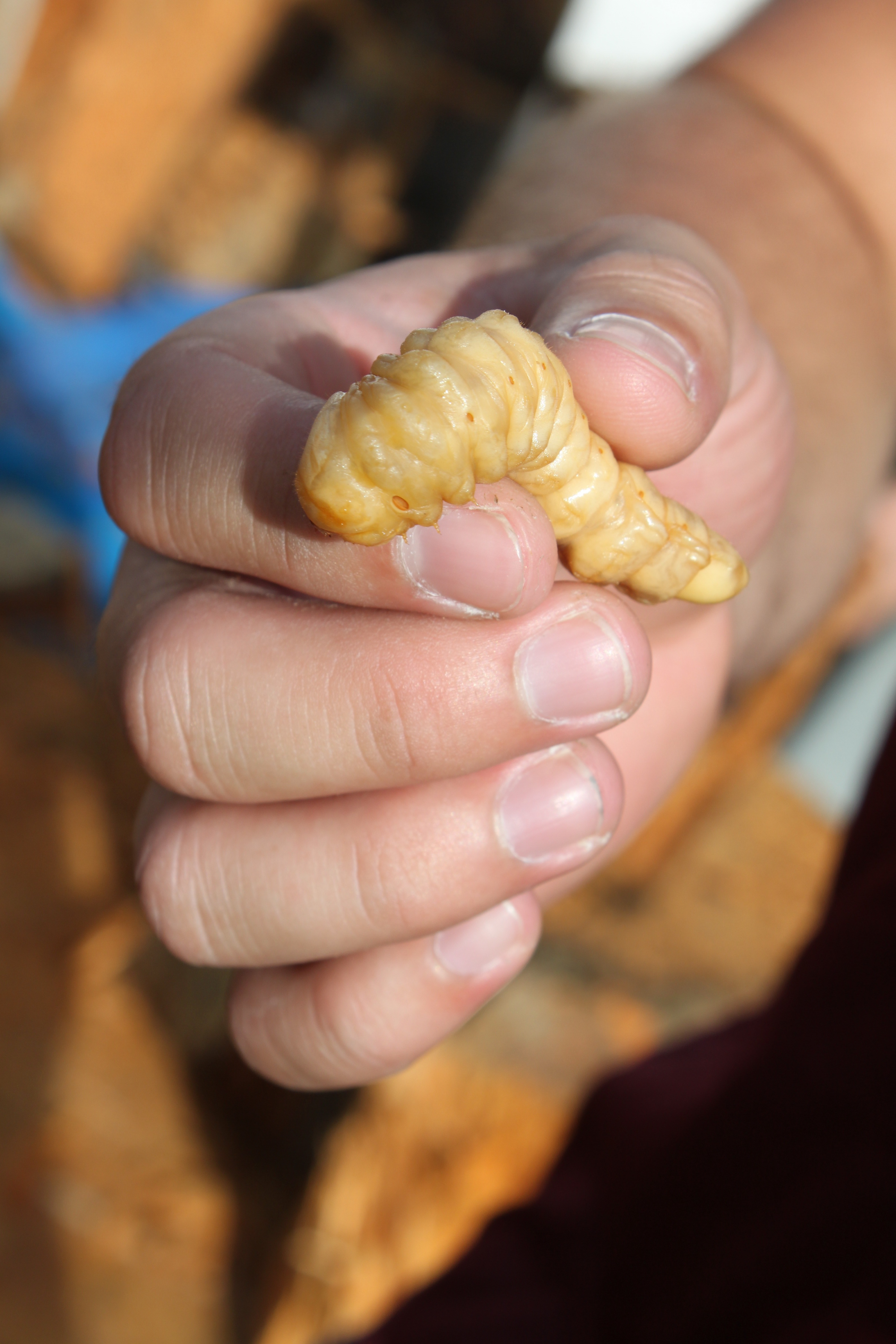
Live huhu grub

The Wildfoods Festival's distinctive identity comes from the range of unusual foods available. Its most notorious offerings include:

- Huhu grubs, the larvae of the large New Zealand beetle Prionoplus reticularis, retrieved from rotten logs that are chopped up on site. Sometimes served live to daring or intoxicated attendees, but usually cooked on a barbecue, these are described as "nutty and meaty" in flavour.
- Escargots (or Westcargots) made from the introduced European snail Cornu aspersum, gathered by locals from their gardens, and fed on carrots for three days by Westland High School teachers, or on flour for a week by the Hokitika Girl Guides and Brownies.
- Sheep testicles or "mountain oysters", not to be confused with Rocky Mountain oysters (bull testicles)
- Pigs' nipples ("nipples on a stick") and snout on a stick
- Stallion semen, squirted from a syringe (a microscope is available to examine the live spermatozoa)
- Home-brewed moonshine, served one year by the Hokitika Rotary Club with a sheep drenching gun.

Other foods offered at the festival have included chicken feet, jellied fish eye shots, lamb tails, crocodile and kangaroo bites, baby octopus, fish heads, pig pizzle, sheep brain pâté, sweetbreads, wild pork, whitebait fritters, pāua, pipi, wasp larvae ice cream, deer and bull semen, gorse-flower wine, earthworms, possum, pig's trotters, mussels, venison, scallops, hāngī, crispy tarantulas, bovine colostrum milkshakes, pork-blood casserole, cow udders, seagull eggs, live grasshoppers, and whisky sausages.

The prizewinning recipe at the first Wildfoods Festival was venison goulash, prepared by Pierre Esquilat of Hokitika's Cafe de Paris. There are cooking demonstrations by celebrity chefs such as Ben Bayly and MasterChef NZ 2015 winner Tim Read. Maggie Beer was the Festival celebrity chef in 1995, and Helen Jackson (who comes from Hokitika) in 1999.

Food at the Wildfoods Festival

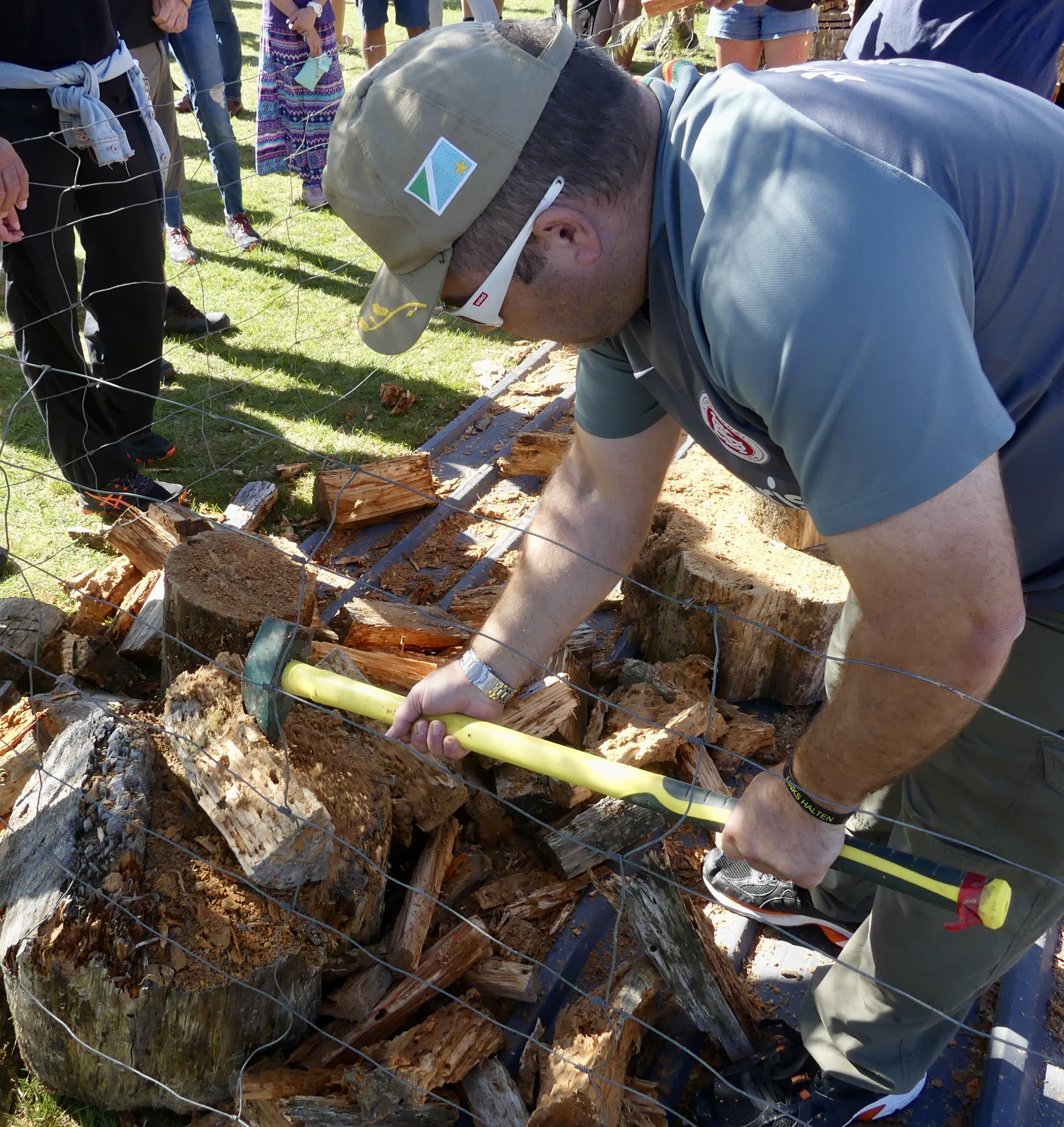
Splitting wood for huhu grubs

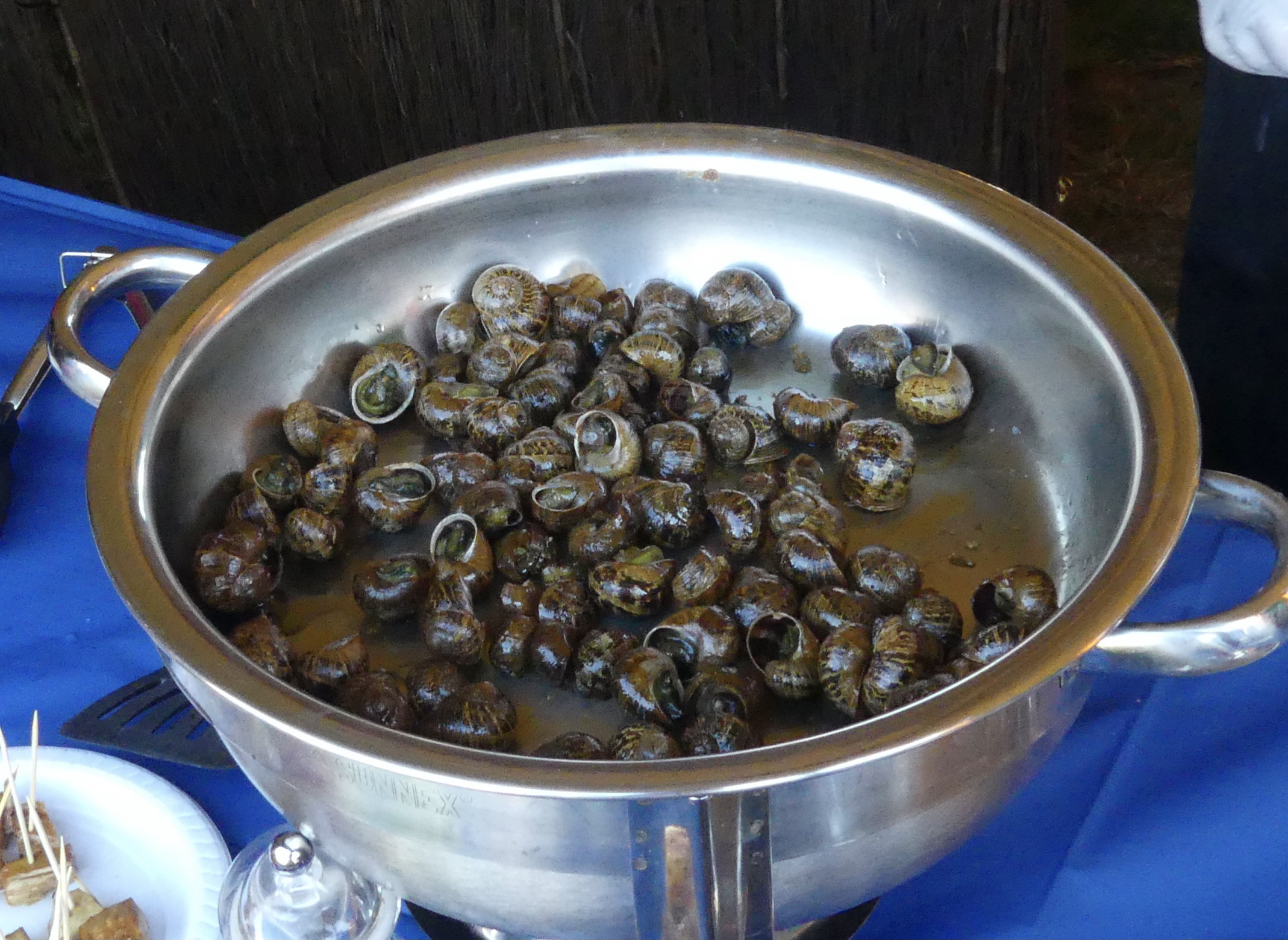
"Westcargots"

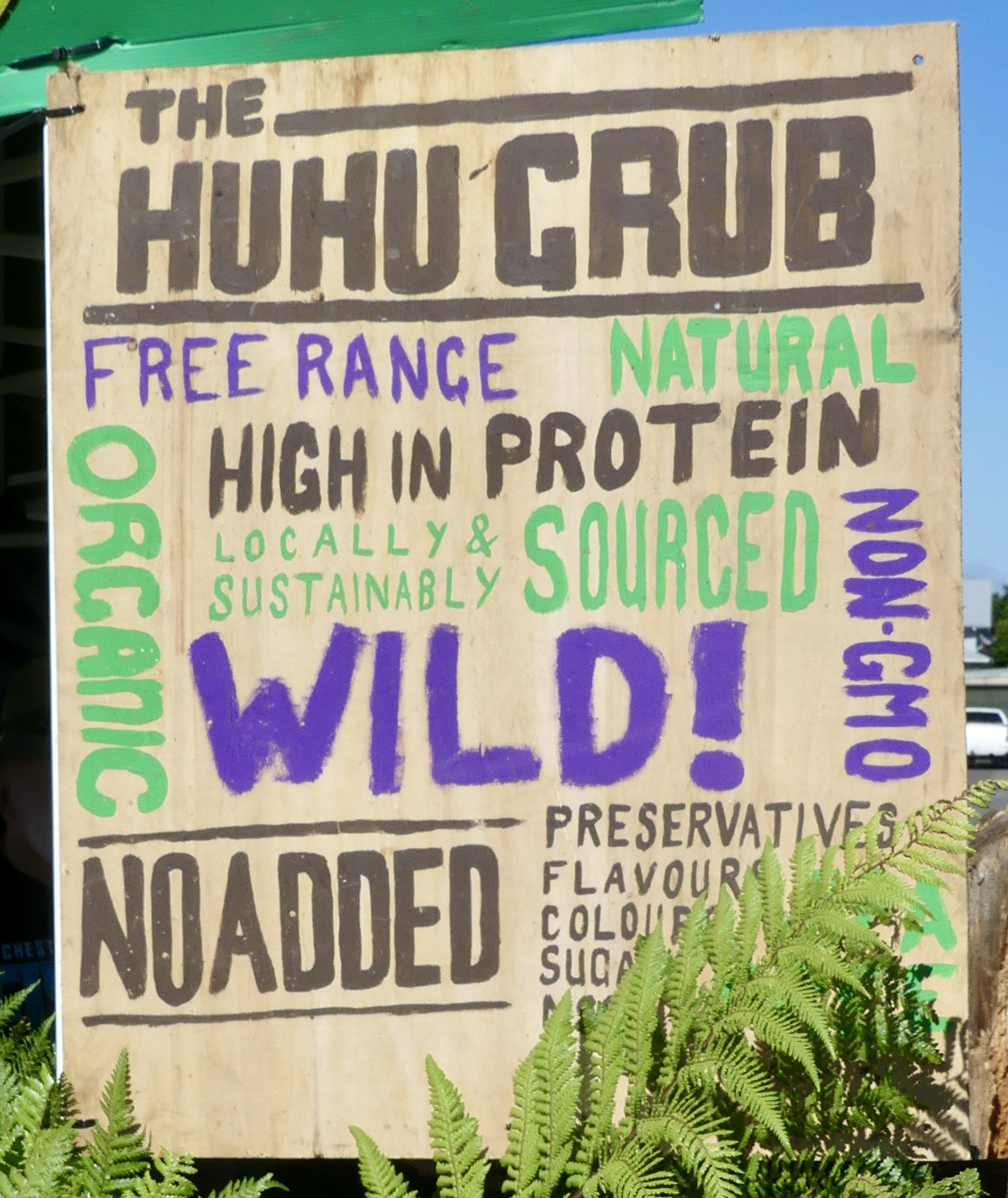

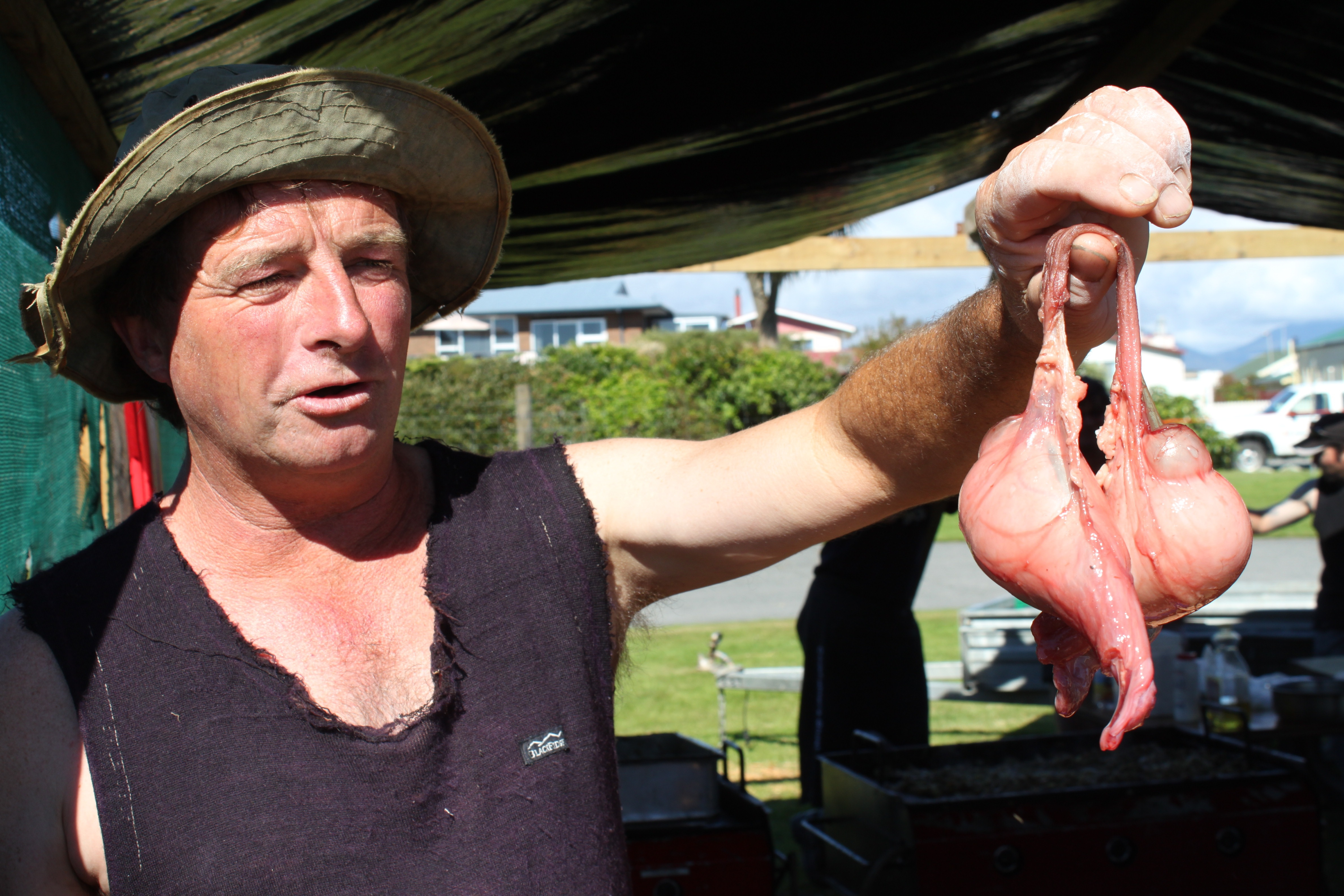
Sheep testicles, also known as mountain oysters

== Other events ==
Dressing up in novelty costumes is common at Wildfoods, and the festival runs a Feral Fashion competition. Musical entertainment has been provided by the New Zealand Army Band, the Black Seeds, Salmonella Dub, Elemeno P, and local musicians such as the West Coast Kokatahi Band, Westland District Brass, and Hokitika Districts Country Music Club. A fireworks display ends the festival.

Costumes at the 2011 Wildfoods Festival

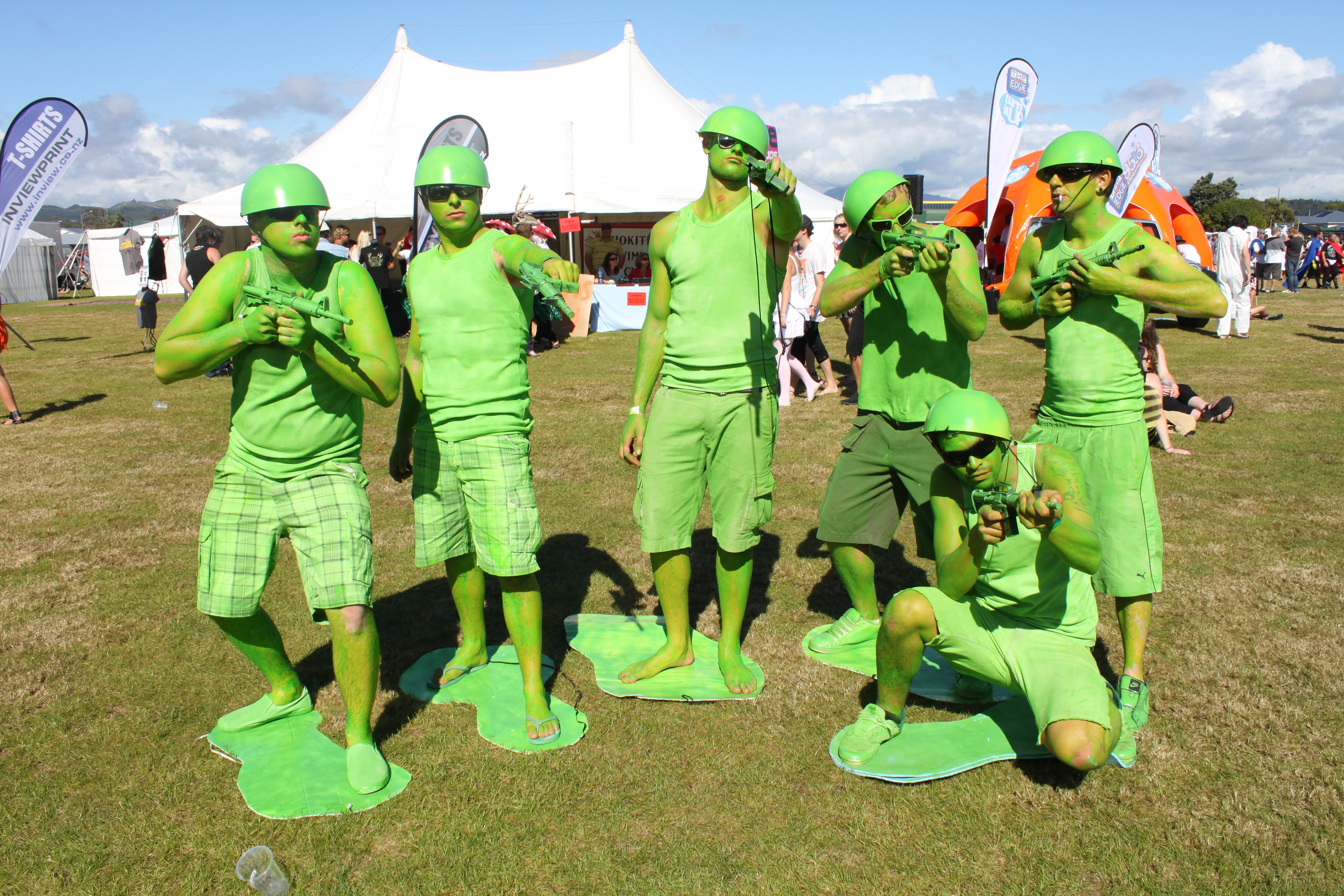
"Army Men"

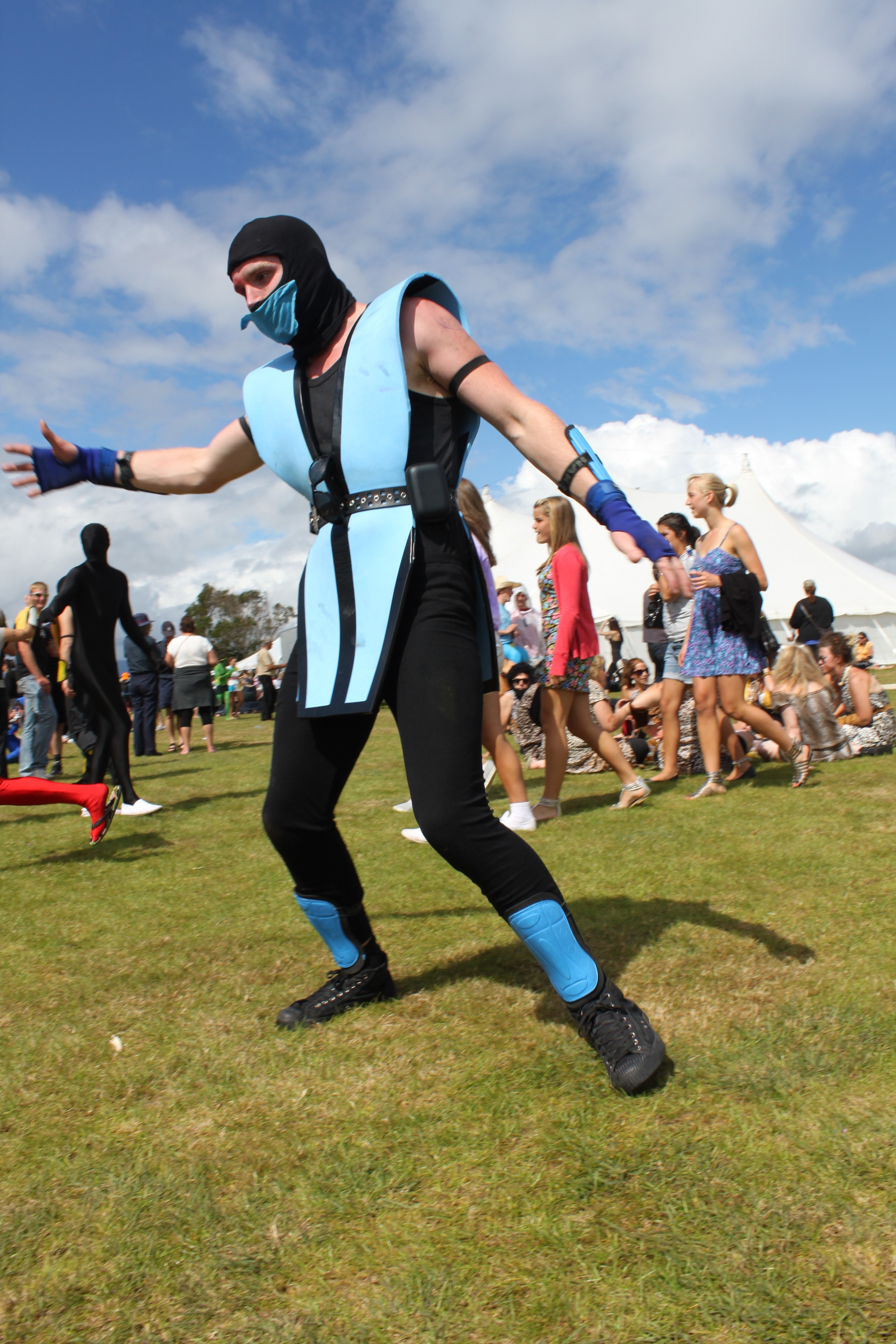
"Sub Zero"

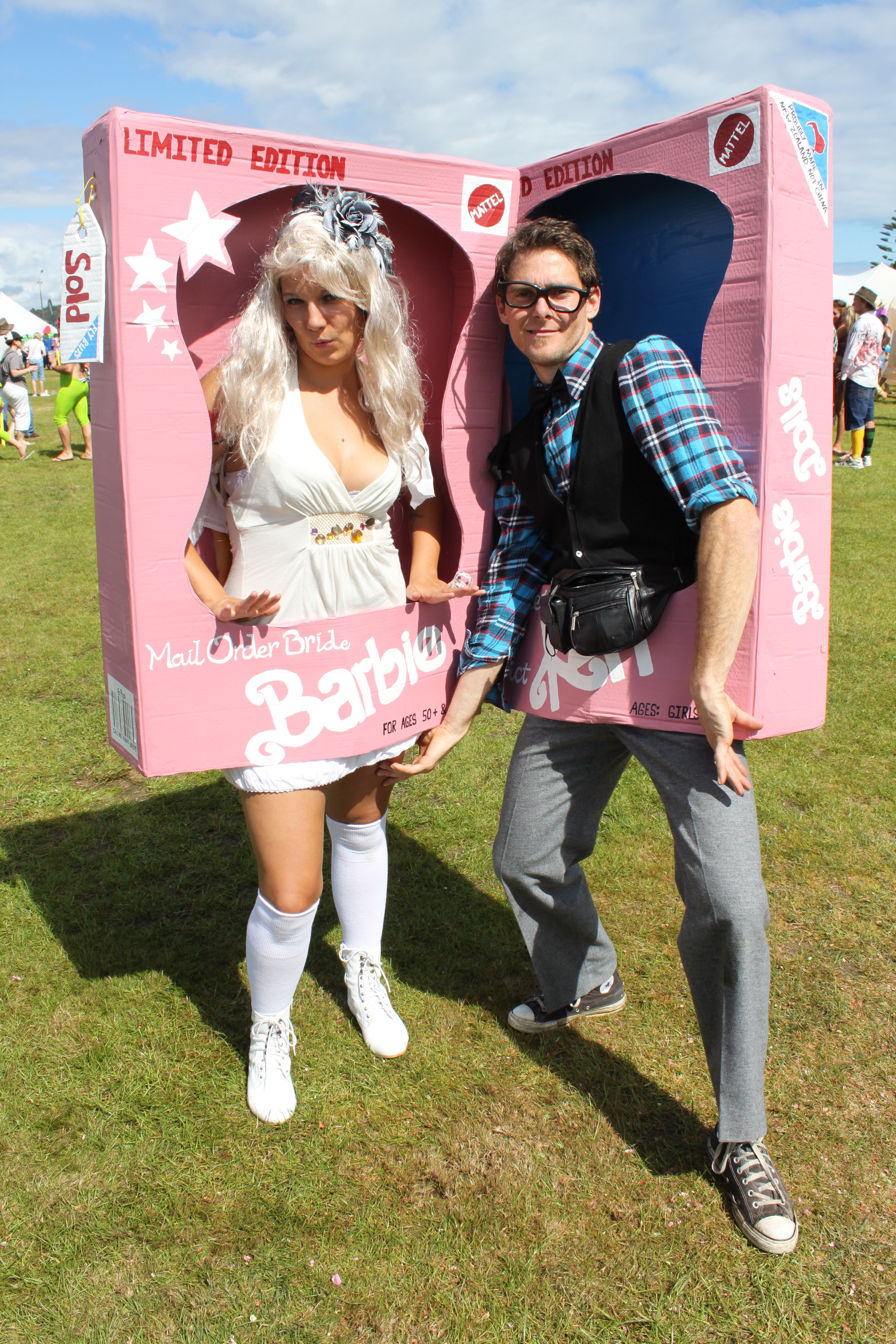
"Barbie and Ken"

== In culture ==
The 1999 New Zealand feature film Magik and Rose, directed by Vanessa Alexander, is set before and during the Hokitika Wildfoods Festival. It was partly shot at the 10th festival in 1999 (guest presenter Gary McCormick makes a cameo). The film's world premiere was at Hokitika's Regent Theatre at the 2000 festival.
