= Armağan Ballantyne =

New Zealand director

- Born: 7 August 1972 (age 53); Wellington, New Zealand
- Occupations: Director, writer

Armağan Ballantyne (born 7 August 1972) is a New Zealand film director. She is best known for her feature films The Strength of Water (2009) and Nude Tuesday (2022).

== Biography ==
Ballantyne was born in Wellington in 1972. Her first name is Turkish, and was the name of a family friend. In 1996, Ballantyne directed the music video for Emma Paki's "Don't Give It Up", which won an award. Afterwards, Ballantyne studied film in Sydney and Prague. From 2001 to 2002, Ballantyne worked a director for the New Zealand youth television series Being Eve.

In 2009, she released her debut feature film The Strength of Water. Written by Briar Grace-Smith, the film focuses on the story of two Māori youth in rural Hokianga. Her 2018 short film Hush won the award for best director at the Show Me Shorts international short film festival. The film won a number of awards, including Best Feature Film at the Wairoa Māori Film Festival, Antipodean Film Festival, and the Grand Jury prize at the Annonay International Film Festival.

In 2022, Ballantyne released Nude Tuesday, a comedy film performed in a fictional language that Ballantyne had developed and wrote together with lead actress Jackie van Beek.

== Filmography ==
=== Films ===
Year	Title	Director	Writer	Notes
1996	Whistle She Rolls	Yes	No	Short film
1998	A Fine Weekend	Yes	No	Short film
1999	Little Echo Lost	Yes	No	Short film
2008	Stories on Human Rights	Yes	No	Segment "Lily and Ra"
2009	The Strength of Water	Yes	No	
2018	Hush	Yes	Yes	Short film
2022	Nude Tuesday	Yes	Yes	

=== Television ===
Year	Title	Director	Writer
2001–2002	Being Eve	Yes	No
