= Vanessa Alexander =

Australian-American screenwriter

- Born: New York, U.S
- Citizenship: Australian/New Zealand/British/American
- Education: University of New South Wales
- Occupation: Screenwriter
- Writing career
- Language: English
- Notable works: Vikings: Valhalla; The Great; Tin Star; The Wrong Girl; Love Child; Agent Anna; Power Rangers; Being Eve

Vanessa Alexander is an American, Australian, New Zealand and British screenwriter, director and producer best known for writing on Vikings: Valhalla and The Great.

== Early life and education ==
Alexander was born in New York to a New Zealand father and English mother. She grew up in Laguna Beach, California before relocating to Oamaru, New Zealand in her teens. She was educated at Laguna Beach High School, Waitaki Girls' High School and the University of Otago, where she studied a Bachelor of Arts in English Literature. She also holds a post-graduate diploma in film directing from The Victorian College of the Arts and a Ph.D. in Creative Writing from The University of New South Wales.

Alexander lives in Newcastle, Australia, moving there in 2012 after living in Paris.

== Career ==
Alexander began her career writing stage plays in New Zealand and almost left the industry to apply for medical school after receiving multiple rejections for short film funding. She won an international student playwriting contest in 1990 with a feminist reinterpretation of T.S. Eliot's poem The Waste Land, titled My Nightingale has Come Unzipped. Her first feature film Magik and Rose, which she wrote and directed at the age of 28, was produced by New Zealand director Larry Parr and funded by the New Zealand Film Commission under a low-budget film development scheme. The film was shot in New Zealand's South Island at the Hokitika Wildfoods Festival with a budget of $350,000 and was nominated for four New Zealand Film Awards. It also won a jury prize at the Oporto Film Festival in Portugal.

Alexander was a producer for Taika Waititi’s second short film Two Cars, One Night and has been a board member for the New Zealand Film Commission. Her first job in television was as a producer, writer and director for the New Zealand children television series Being Eve. The series was nominated for an International Emmy Award in the Children and Young People category.

Alexander wrote for the Netflix series Vikings: Valhalla and was also a writer for the comedy-drama television series The Great, which was nominated for numerous awards, including two Writers Guild of America awards for which Alexander was a listed nominee. She has written for the British-Canadian television series Tin Star and the Australian television series Love Child, The Secret Daughter and The Wrong Girl, for which she was nominated for an AWGIE Award. She directed the New Zealand television series Agent Anna.

On 21 January 2021, ViacomCBS International named Alexander as the lead writer for its development of a television series about the Italian baroque artist Artemisia Gentileschi. Titled "Artemisia", the series is also being produced by former ViacomCBS International Studios UK managing director Jill Offman and Pan's Labyrinth producer Frida Torresblanco, who said the development "will be a contemporary feminist piece that is at once provocative and transgressive, invoking the spirit of our present moment in an eloquent and elegant way”.

After the fall of Kabul to the Taliban in 2021, Vanessa helped more than 100 Afghan women and their families escape Afghanistan and created a network that coordinated the rescue of more than 300 Afghan women fleeing the Taliban. For this she received the Keys to the City of Newcastle in 2023, as well as the 2023 Golden Wattle Award, an annual award given to an Australian who has brought honour and inspiration to their fellow Australians over the previous 12 months.

== Filmography ==
=== Film ===
Title	Year	Credited as				Notes	Ref.
Title	Year	Director	Producer	Writer	Executive producer	Notes	Ref.
My Mother Practices Drowning	1995	Yes	No	Yes	No	Short film	
Magik and Rose	1999	Yes	No	Yes	No	Directorial debut	
Two Cars, One Night	2003	No	No	No	Yes	Short film	
Henchman	2003	No	Yes	No	No	Short film	
Tiga E Le Iloa	2004	No	No	No	Yes	Short film	
His Father's Shoes	2004	No	No	No	Yes	Short film	
The Man Who Couldn't Dance	2005	No	No	No	Yes	Short film	
Fish Out of Water	2005	No	No	No	Yes	Short film	
Karma	2006	No	No	No	Yes	Short film	
Cargo	2007	No	Yes	No	Yes	Short film	
Bridge	2008	No	No	No	Yes	Short film	
Ser un ser humano	2011	No	Yes	No	No	Documentary film	

=== Television ===
The numbers in directing and writing credits refer to the number of episodes.

Title	Year	Credited as			Network	Notes	Ref.
Title	Year	Creator	Director	Writer	Network	Notes	Ref.
Being Eve	2001–02	No	Yes (6)	No	TV3	Producer; Story and script editor (series 2)	
Lovebites	2002	No	No	Yes	TV3		
Mercy Peak	2003	No	Yes (2)	No	TV One		
Outrageous Fortune	2005	No	Yes (2)	No	TV3		
The Pretender	2005	No	No	Yes (2)	TV3	Script producer (series 1)	
Maddigan's Quest	2006	No	Yes (2)	No	TV3		
Power Rangers Operation Overdrive	2007	No	Yes (3)	No	Toon Disney		
Power Rangers Jungle Fury	2008	No	Yes (6)	No	Toon Disney		
Burying Brian	2008	No	No	No	TV One	Storyliner	
Power Rangers RPM	2009	No	Yes (3)	No	ABC		
This Is Not My Life	2010	Developer	No	No	TV One	Script producer Storyliner	
Agent Anna	2013–14	Yes	Yes (3)	Yes (5)	TV One		
The Wrong Girl	2016–17	No	No	Yes (2)	Network Ten		
Love Child	2017	No	No	Yes (2)	Nine Network		
The Secret Daughter	2017	No	No	Yes (1)	Seven Network		
Extreme Engagement	2019	No	No	No	Netflix	Executive producer	
The Great	2020	No	No	No	Hulu	Staff writer (season 1: 9 episodes); Story editor (season 2)	
Tin Star	2020	No	No	Yes (1)	Sky Atlantic		
Vikings: Valhalla	2022–present	No	No	Yes (4)	Netflix	Co-executive producer (season 2)	
