= Being Eve =

New Zealand television series

- Created by: Maxine Fleming; Katherine Fry; Gavin Strawhan
- Directed by: Peter Salmon; Vanessa Alexander; Armağan Ballantyne; Zane Holmes
- Starring: Fleur Saville; Joanna Morrison; Alison Bruce; Stephen Lovatt; Tandi Wright; Lionel Wickliffe; David de Lautour; Leighton Cardno; Cameron Stanton; Michelle O'Brien; Jay Ryan
- Opening theme: "The Girl in the Song"
- Ending theme: "The Girl in the Song" (21 episodes) "The Girl in the Song" (instrumental) (1 episode)
- Country of origin: New Zealand
- Original language: English
- No. of seasons: 2
- No. of episodes: 26

Production
- Executive producers: John Barnett; Sally Campbell; Andrew Shaw; Jay Firestone; Adrian Haight; Maxine Fleming (12 episodes)
- Producers: Vanessa Alexander; Anne Williams
- Cinematography: Neil Cerwin; Phil Burchall; Fred Renata; Dale McCready; Warwick Wrigley
- Running time: 30 minutes
- Production companies: South Pacific Pictures; Fireworks Entertainment; The N Original Productions

Original release
- Network: TV3
- Release: 1 April 2002 – 13 January 2003

Being Eve is a teen comedy drama television series from New Zealand, originally shown on TV3 from 2001 to 2002, and later broadcast on Noggin's teen block The N in the United States. Being Eve focuses on a teenage girl, Eve Baxter, and her daily problems. Her parents are divorced but live next door to each other. Eve was in love with a boy named Adam. They broke up at the beginning of the second season, and she ends up with another boy named Sam Hooper, with whom she had her first kiss when they were kids.

The show was created by Gavin Strawhan and Maxine Fleming, who wanted to make a quality show aimed at children ages 9 through 14.

== Cast ==
=== Main characters ===
- Fleur Saville as Eve Baxter
- Stephen Lovatt as Tim Baxter
- Joanna Morrison as Sylvie Stern
- Alison Bruce as Vivienne Baxter
- Tandi Wright as Alannah Lush
- Lionel Wickliffe as Matt Te Ahi
- Leighton Cardno as Ned Baxter
- Cameron Stanton as Caleb Baxter
- Michelle O'Brien as Charlotte Tucker
- David de Lautour as Adam Le Beau
- Jay Ryan as Sam Hooper

=== Recurring characters ===
- Vicki Lin as Melanie
- Renee Leonard-Rogers as Melissa
- Paul Barrett as Mr. Inglewood
- Karl Willetts as Lenny
- James Hobby as Floyd
- David Taylor as Corban
- Todd Emerson as Harley
- James Napier as Jared Preston
- Hannah Tolich as Imogen
- Lee Wenham as Gus
- Sherril Cooper as Ms. Grieveley
- Ben Crowder as Librarian
- Rosalie Carey as Mrs. Sparrow
- Brett O'Gorman as Oliver Tucker
- Wendy Meyer as Mrs. Whittering
- Martin Baynton as Leo
- Nicole Whippy as Elektra
- Margaret-Mary Hollins as Sukhita
- Jacob Teleiai as Jason
- Tania Anderson as Sal
- Michelle Langstone as Miss Renee
- Jimmy Berkeley as 8 Year Old Ned
- James Stanton as Jack Sherwin
- Sam Wallace as Daniel
- Jodi Russell as Cheerleader Barbie
- Vanessa Saunders as Cheerleader Barbie (2 episodes)
- Mandy McMullin as Josie Le Beau
- Richard Lambeth as Scott

== Episodes ==
=== Season 1 (2001) ===
No. overall	No. in season	Title	Directed by	Written by	Original release date
1	1	"Being in Love"	Peter Salmon	Maxine Fleming	25 August 2001
Eve Baxter is a 15-year-old New Zealand girl who attends Eden Heights High School with her two best friends: Matt, who dreams of becoming a dancer one day, and Sylvie, who is only interested in boys and is supposedly in 'love' with Jared Preston, though Eve finds him disturbing. Eve's parents are divorced but live next door to each other: Eve lives with her mother and younger brother Caleb; her older brother Ned ('King of the Couch Potatoes') lives with their father and his new girlfriend Alannah. Eve's mother is a caterer and her father is a plumber. Eve dreams of her perfect match, but when presenting speeches on Modern Romances, she expresses her doubts about love. Then Adam LeBeau enters her class.
2	2	"Being Popular"	Peter Salmon	Briar Grace Smith & Maxine Fleming	1 September 2001
Sylvie, Matt, Adam, and most of the Eden Heights High student body are invited to beautiful, popular, blonde Charlotte's party, except for Eve and other so-called 'geeks'. Crestfallen at not being invited to the party, Eve seeks advice from her kind elderly neighbor. She tries going to a movie on her own, but finds out she has a better time talking with her mother. Matt is displeased that Charlotte did not invite Eve and asks her to call and invite her. Eve politely declines, so Matt sabotages the party: everybody flees because someone had 'crapped' in the pool (Matt had actually thrown a sausage into it). Matt, Sylvie, and Adam go to Eve's and the four have a good laugh about Charlotte's disastrous party.
3	3	"Being Beautiful"	Peter Salmon	Gavin Strawhan	8 September 2001
Watching Charlotte get Adam's attention, Eve wishes she could be the lucky recipient, so when Alannah invites her to come shopping, Eve eagerly agrees. Meanwhile, Sylvie's Yoga-enthusiast parents monitor her food intake, but Sylvie says she is fine as she is. Eve returns to school dressed quite differently; she does catch Adam's eye, but does not notice his annoyed expression. Eve returns home to change into her school uniform and get her art project. A sudden thought of something Adam said causes her to accidentally drop her project and she runs home, humiliated. Sylvie is also sent home early, as she fainted in art class when Eve ran away. When she feels stronger, she stands up to her parents about her appearance. Eve cheers up when her mother has a talk with her.
4	4	"Being Bad"	Peter Salmon	Maxine Fleming	22 September 2001
Eve is tired of always being the 'good girl' so she skips study hall and sneaks out of school with Matt. Sylvie remains behind covering their trail and basking in a male classmate's interest in her. Eve and Matt hang out near a bus stop until they are spotted by a bus driver and flee. They see a group of protesters trying to protect a tree from construction works, and Eve joins their protest. The people are thrilled when she speaks up for their causes, but then the police arrives. Eve gets a lecture from her parents when they see her on TV, chained to the tree, but they do not follow up with a punishment. The next day, Adam and her English teacher commend her for her protest speech. Eve realizes that she cannot be the 'bad' girl: just being the girl she has always been, like everyone knows her, is enough.
5	5	"Being Kissed"	Armağan Ballantyne	Maxine Fleming	22 September 2001
The day before the big social dance evening, the principal warns all the students about being too intimate with one another at the event. This only gives Eve the urge to kiss Adam, but it is also revealed that she has only kissed three boys. Eve, Sylvie, and Matt have planned to attend together, then Sylvie invites Adam along. That night, Eve's mother has a date arranged for her by a friend, though Eve feels unsure of her moving on from Dad so quickly. Matt arrives at Eve's without Adam, which disappoints her, but she heads out with Matt and Sylvie. Only when Eve is about to leave the dance, she bumps into Adam, who explains that something had come up at home that made him late to meet Matt. Eve kisses him passionately, and his surprise disappoints her. The next day she tells Sylvie she really likes Adam.
6	6	"Being Betrayed"	Armagan Ballantyne	Miranda Wilson & Gavin Strawhan	29 September 2001
Adam invites Sylvie to a movie, to her delight, which turns to disappointment when he tells her to bring Eve and Matt. Sylvie too has developed a crush on Adam, but he questions Sylvie about how close Eve and Matt are. She says they are really close, but Adam wonders if they had been dating. After school, Sylvie feels guilty that she did not tell Eve about the movie, so she tells her then, omitting that Adam wanted Eve and Matt to join them. Eve says she has plans of her own, but does express surprise that Sylvie and Adam are going somewhere alone together. At the movie Adam and Sylvie are enjoying a light, friendly conversation, unaware that Matt is watching them. They run into him afterward and Matt mentions to Sylvie that it should be obvious that Eve likes Adam. Meanwhile, Eve watches Adam and Sylvie drive off on his scooter, but they do not see her because she is standing near a group of people wearing masks. When Eve gets to school the next day, she sadly realizes that Sylvie and Adam look very much like a new couple. Matt confronts Adam about his obliviousness to Eve's feelings for him. Adam has a talk with Eve about her and Matt, but she says she only likes Adam as a friend and remains deeply unhappy that her best friend is dating the boy she had grown to like.
7	7	"Being Scared"	Britta Johnstone	Maxine Fleming & Gavin Strawhan	6 October 2001
Eve is plagued by nightmares about being forced to choose between Adam and Sylvie. Later, Eve and her schoolmates going on a camping trip chaperoned by her mother and Mr. Inglewood. Eve, Adam, and Sylvie get lost when Sylvie, paranoid about Eve and Adam's relationship, runs off into the forest and they pursue her. Back at home, Alannah forces Ned to get a job when their TV dies.
8	8	"Being Just Mates"	Britta Johnstone	Maxine Fleming & Briar Grace-Smith	13 October 2001
Adam's alcoholic mother has had an accident and Eve's family invites him to stay with them while she recovers. Eve finds having her crush in her home strange, and ponders if a boy and girl really can be 'just friends'. Additionally, she and Matt discover that they might be closer than they think they are. Meanwhile, Sylvie tries to improve her relationship with Adam but fails at everything she tries.
9	9	"Being Different"	Vanessa Alexander & Peter Salmon	Niko Caro & Maxine Fleming	20 October 2001
Eve and Matt have a difficult time communicating after their kiss; she also has trouble reconciling her feelings towards Adam. Matt endures bullying from Jared while preparing for a dance audition. Sylvie seeks revenge on Charlotte for egging her on with Adam by using Eve's doll as a voodoo doll, seemingly causing several maladies to befall Charlotte.
10	10	"Being a Couple"	Vanessa Alexander & Peter Salmon	Gavin Strawhan	27 October 2001
Eve deals with her feelings about being in a committed relationship with Matt, as well as her unease about dating someone of Māorian descent. Their relationship is further strained when Caleb's Māori friend is chosen to be in Matt's music video and Caleb is excluded. Sylvie fends off the advances of a new Indian student who falls in love with her after she helps him avoid Jared's bullying.
11	11	"Being Dead"	Andrew Merrifield	James Griffin & Gavin Strawhan	3 November 2001
A classmate, Philippa, suddenly passes away and Eve is anxious about attending her funeral. Sylvie believes she is cursed because she forgot to return Philippa's pen, so she holds a séance to seek Philippa's absolution. Adam gives Caleb a pet rabbit, then spends the rest of his time trying to rescue it from harm, but Caleb does not have the best track-record with pets.
12	12	"Being Pregnant"	Andrew Merrifield	Maxine Fleming	10 November 2001
Alannah's driving desire to get pregnant puts a stress on both Baxter households. After numerous failed attempts at getting pregnant, Tim and Alannah decide to marry, ruining Eve's hopes that her parents will reunite. Matt's romantic intensity, when added to the stress of the impending wedding, drives Eve into Adam's arms. Pravesh and Sylvie have a disastrous date when he becomes nauseated after eating pizza.
13	13	"Being Married"	Andrew Merrifield	Gavin Strawhan	17 November 2001
Eve intends to break up with Matt so she can begin dating Adam, but she chickens out of telling Matt, though she tells Adam she did tell Matt. Heartbroken over Tim's wedding, Vivienne goes out with a stripper she dated in the past. Sylvie breaks up with Pravesh over his inability to kiss. Adam accompanies Eve to the wedding, as Matt is busy with dance rehearsals, but the rehearsal is cancelled and Matt shows up at the wedding, where he and Adam learn that Eve has been lying to them. They decide to remain friends, but they now have negative emotions toward Eve. At the wedding's first dance, Matt begins dancing with Sylvie, and Adam reluctantly joins Eve, unsure of his feelings or their future.

=== Season 2 (2002) ===
No. overall	No. in season	Title	Directed by	Written by	Original release date
14	1	"Being Heartbroken"	Peter Salmon	Peter Salmon	30 June 2002
When Adam moves away, Eve throws herself into extracurricular activities to channel her feelings, but her schoolwork suffers. To show solidarity with Eve, Sylvie vows not to date for two weeks, but then a handsome new boy shows interest in her. Sylvie tries to rush Eve's healing process by coaching the awkward Lenny to ask her out. Desperate when she cannot find anyone to commiserate with her, Eve turns to Alannah.
15	2	"Being History"	Peter Salmon	Gavin Strawhan	1 July 2002
Sam, a new boy at school, has piqued the interest of all the girls. It turns out that Sam is the boy that kissed Eve when they were little. Sylvie spreads this story and Eve's classmates ridicule her when Sam denies the kiss occurred. Meanwhile, Vivienne and Tim argue over ownership of an old toilet-seat cover discovered in a bathroom cabinet.
16	3	"Being Famous"	Peter Salmon	Maxine Fleming	2 July 2002
Sam gets a job filming students for a local youth-TV program and fame-hungry Sylvie tries out, enlisting Eve to write her material. Worrying that Sylvie's fame will strain their friendship, Eve also tries out, but totally fumbles her audition. Eve becomes irate with Sam when Sam edits Eve's audition footage to make her appear even more inept and it airs on TV. To cure Vivienne's supposed loneliness, Alannah adopts a famous local hero dog for Vivienne as a gift, which totally disrupts Vivienne's routine.
17	4	"Being Alien"	Vanessa Alexander	Kirsty McKenzie	3 July 2002
The pretty and popular Imogen transfers to Eden Heights High, and instantly becomes the center of attention of the entire school body. Eve worries that Imogen seeks to undermine her friendship with Sylvie, which motivates Eve to defeat Imogen in the upcoming class debate on the topic of friendship. Ned is estatic over the installation of his new TV satellite dish, but it ruins Alannah's yard landscaping plans. Ned eventually becomes convinced that the signal interference on his TV is communication transmissions from alien beings.
18	5	"Being Individual"	Vanessa Alexander	Kirsty McKenzie & Maxine Fleming	4 July 2002
The school hires a new sexually charismatic science teacher that encourages independent thought. Eve bows to peer pressure when she agrees to co-head the cheerleading squad with Imogen. This creates friction with Sylvie who fails to make first string on the squad. Tim becomes jealous of Vivienne's new plumber, who happens to be the spitting image of himself.
19	6	"Being Grown Up"	Zane Holmes	Maxine Fleming & Kate McDermott	5 July 2002
Eve and Ned celebrate their birthdays, as their birthdays are two days apart. Ned sporadically decides to move out, but Tim's dad moves in for a visit, and proves to be more of a nuisance and TV hog than Ned. On Eve's birthday, Matt, Eve, Imogen, and Sylvie try to sneak into a nightclub, but Eve is denied entrance because she looks too young, and her friends go in anyway. Realizing her friends are growing apart from her, Eve breaks up with Sylvie the next day. Ned returns home after he realizes real life is nothing like a sitcom.
20	7	"Being a Winner"	Zane Holmes	Gavin Strawhan & Kate McDermott	7 July 2002
Eve attempts to hide from her friends by ducking into the boys' room. When Sylvie and Imogen follow her in, Sylvie is caught with another student's marijuana stash and expelled. Eve and Imogen are entered into an exchange-student speech competition, and neither one wants to come to Sylvie's defense fearing that the negative stigma will ruin their chances at traveling to Japan. Alannah grooms the family to appear more successful than they are in order to impress an old friend that's visiting.
21	8	"Being Reborn"	Virginia Pitts, Peter Salmon & Vanessa Alexander	Kirsty McKenzie	8 July 2002
Sylvie has a near-death moment, decides to find religion, and ends up joining a local cult when she develops a crush on its leader. Eve attempts an intervention when she suspects the cult is a sham. Meanwhile, Ned develops a crush on a local TV hostess.
22	9	"Being Upstaged"	Virginia Pitts, Peter Salmon & Vanessa Alexander	Kate McDermott	9 July 2002
Mr. Inglewood's class begins a production of A Midsummer Night's Dream; Eve tries out for play director but ends up deeply, deeply in the shadows as Sam's assistant. Caleb develops a crush on Sylvie when he hits his head and subsequently spies her dressed up as Hermia for the play.
23	10	"Being Obsessed"	Andrew Merrifield	Kirsty McKenzie & Maxine Fleming	10 July 2002
Eve worries that she is becoming obsessed with Sam when she repeatedly dreams of them falling in love on the Titanic. Sylvie convinces herself that she is interested in Matt and uses witchcraft to cast a love spell on his handkerchief. Alannah's co-worker attempts to seduce Tim.
24	11	"Being at War"	Andrew Merrifield	Peter Salmon	10 July 2002
Ned, Tim, and Caleb become obsessed with a new multiplayer battlefield video game, forcing Alannah to move in with Vivienne. Mr. Inglewood signs up his class for a paintball battle so they might better understand the psychological and physical concepts of war. Feeling that this glorifies war, Eve plans to conscientiously-object by sitting it out, but her exasperation towards Sam's arrogance eventually motivates her to join the competition.
25	12	"Being Tested"	Peter Salmon	Steven Zanoski & Maxine Fleming	11 July 2002
Sam enlists Eve to help him plant a hidden camera in Principal Grievely's house. Eve finds it difficult to study for her upcoming exams due to Sam's demands. Ned cannot find anyone to help him pass his driving test.
26	13	"Being True"	Peter Salmon	Kristy McKenzie & Maxine Fleming	12 July 2002
Eve is saddened that Sam has decided to take Imogen to the school ball instead of her. Tim and Alannah plan to move away from next door, but first they must catch the neighborhood thief who is stealing women's underwear. Eve plans to stay home from the dance, but Tim convinces her to go. To ditch their annoying dates, Sylvie and Matt hook up at the dance. Realizing the true nature of his relationship with Eve, Sam gets on stage and proclaims his feelings for her. Sam and Eve join together for a slow romantic dance.

== DVD releases ==
South Pacific Pictures released Being Eve on DVD in Region 4 on 24 October 2007. Both seasons were combined on the same DVD release.
