= Agent Anna =

- Genre: Comedy drama
- Created by: Maxine Fleming; Vanessa Alexander
- Developed by: Philip Smith; Rachel Gardner
- Directed by: Vanessa Alexander; Peter Salmon; Murray Keane; Michael Duignan
- Starring: Robyn Malcolm; Adam Gardiner; Theresa Healey; Roy Billing
- Narrated by: Robyn Malcolm
- Theme music composer: Dulciana
- Opening theme: "Above the Clouds" (featuring Little Lapin)
- Composer: Ben King
- Country of origin: New Zealand
- Original language: English
- No. of series: 2
- No. of episodes: 16 (list of episodes)

Production
- Executive producers: Philip Smith; Robyn Malcolm (series 2)
- Producer: Rachel Gardner
- Cinematography: Dave Cameron
- Running time: 21–23 minutes
- Production company: Great Southern Film and Television

Original release
- Network: TV One
- Release: 31 January 2013 – 7 August 2014

Agent Anna is a New Zealand comedy-drama television series, created by Maxine Fleming with Vanessa Alexander and devised by Robyn Malcolm. It is produced by Great Southern Film and Television and funded by NZ on Air and Television New Zealand. It began airing its first series of six episodes in New Zealand on 31 January 2013. NZ on Air announced on 12 August 2013 that the show received funding for a second series of 10 episodes.

== Premise ==
Anna Kingston's husband has left her and their two teenage daughters and gone to Australia leaving behind substantial debts. The family home has been sold, leaving the family to move into Anna's parents' basement. Armed with a new real estate agent's diploma and a motivational CD, Anna gets a job in an Auckland real estate office. Her co-workers steal her listings and treat her poorly, her daughters miss their previous private school, and her mother is unsympathetic.

== Cast and characters ==
=== Main cast ===
- Robyn Malcolm as Anna Kingston
- Adam Gardiner as Leon Cruickshank – Eden Realty's top selling agent.
- Theresa Healey as Sandi Wright – Eden Realty's resident cougar agent.
- Roy Billing as Clinton Walker – Anna's boss, He owns Eden Realty. He agreed to be paid at New Zealand rates.

=== Recurring cast ===
- Kayleigh Haworth as Bree Walker – Clint and Sandi's 19-year-old daughter, She's the receptionist at Eden Realty.
- Floyd Alexander Hunt as Charlotte "Charlie" Kingston – Anna's 17-year-old daughter. (series 1; guest: series 2)
- Molly Leishman as Bella Kingston – Anna's 14-year-old daughter.
- Janice Finn as Jeanette Dryden – Anna's mother.
- Ian Mune as Neil Dryden – Anna's father.
- Sally Stockwell as Claire – Anna's friend.

=== Guest cast ===
- Ingrid Park as Erica Ball
- Bruce Phillips as John Ball
- Peter Feeney as Adrian
- Louise Wallace as Amanda
- Micheala Rooney as Katherine
- James Gaylyn as Motivational speaker
- John Leigh as James Finlayson
- Cameron Rhodes as Charles Jordan
- Lisa Chappell as Marna
- Fasitua Amosa as Sione
- Hwei Ling Ow as Candy Lin
- Greg Johnson as Daniel Kingston (3 episodes) – Anna's ex-husband.
- Dwayne Cameron as Rory O'Conner
- Jodie Rimmer as Liz – A woman who sells Anna her dream home.
- Alison Quigan as Edith – Anna's aunt, who gives Anna her first paid sale.
- Peter Elliott as Cameron Glover – A property developer.

== Series overview ==
Series	Episodes	Originally aired	
Series	Episodes	First aired	Last aired
1	6	31 January 2013	7 March 2013
2	10	5 June 2014	7 August 2014

=== Series 1 (2013) ===
No. overall	No. in season	Title	Directed by	Written by	Original release date
1	1	"Agent Anna"	Vanessa Alexander	Maxine Fleming	31 January 2013
Anna's first day on the job. She meets friends of her ex-husband's and offers to sell their house.
2	2	"Swimming with Sharks"	Vanessa Alexander	Maxine Fleming and Vanessa Alexander	7 February 2013
Anna is desperate for a sale, and decides to go through the obituaries to find a house that might be available.
3	3	"Happiness"	Vanessa Alexander	Maxine Fleming and Vanessa Alexander	14 February 2013
Anna has a house to sell, but the vendor is extremely unmotivated. Anna hasn't had time for her children and that's starting to be a problem.
4	4	"At Home Here"	Peter Salmon	Vanessa Alexander and Maxine Fleming	21 February 2013
Anna has a run-down apartment, which she thinks might appeal to Pacific Islanders. Her daughter Bella is refusing to obey her.
5	5	"Rules of the World"	Peter Salmon	Vanessa Alexander	28 February 2013
Anna attends a training course in Tauranga, but alcohol gets the better of her.
6	6	"Divorce Dust"	Peter Salmon	Vanessa Alexander	7 March 2013
Anna's husband is back in town, and she is determined to confront him.

=== Series 2 (2014) ===
No. overall	No. in season	Title	Directed by	Written by	Original release date
7	1	"Episode 1"	Murray Keane	Fiona Samuel and Jodie Molloy	5 June 2014
8	2	"Episode 2"	Murray Keane	Fiona Samuel, Jodie Molloy and Maxine Fleming	12 June 2014
9	3	"Episode 3"	Murray Keane	Jodie Molloy and Fiona Samuel	19 June 2014
10	4	"Episode 4"	Michael Duignan	Sophie Jones and Jodie Molloy	26 June 2014
11	5	"Episode 5"	Michael Duignan	Natalie Medlock, Jodie Molloy and Sophie Jones	3 July 2014
12	6	"Episode 6"	Michael Duignan	Jodie Molloy and Fiona Samuel	10 July 2014
13	7	"Episode 7"	Michael Duignan	Fiona Samuel and Natalie Medlock	17 July 2014
14	8	"Episode 8"	Michael Duignan	Jodie Molloy and Fiona Samuel	24 July 2014
15	9	"Episode 9"	Murray Keane	Natalie Medlock and Fiona Samuel	31 July 2014
16	10	"Episode 10"	Murray Keane	Fiona Samuel	7 August 2014

== Broadcast ==
In Australia, the show premiered on 7Two on 15 January 2014., while series 2 eventually premiered shortly after midnight on 2 January 2018 on 7flix (free-to-air channel 76).

== Reception ==
The number of viewers was good by New Zealand standards. Chris Philpott in On the Box says "Malcolm catches the vulnerability, the humanity, at the core of Anna Kingston, and she sells the despair that this former housewife is going through," and he thought the first episode was well-structured. Michelle Hewitson in The New Zealand Herald wrote "it's a rather sweet, giggly little blonde number with not a lot of substance, but who cares? It's obvious Malcolm is having a lot of fun." She thought it was about time for a comedy about the city's "overheated" property market. In contrast, Jane Bowron wrote in The Dominion Post that "the first episode was as hard to sell as a real estate agent's first house sale" and criticised it for being set in Auckland rather than more typical New Zealand, and dealing with a woman who had been out of the workforce for 20 years, which is no longer common for New Zealand women. Nick Grant, also in the Herald, says "[Initially Anna is] little more than a hapless doormat, which at best is more likely to attract a somewhat impatient sympathy than outright affection" but suggests the show will "map [her] journey to independent assertiveness." Diana Wichtel in The New Zealand Listener says "This quiet comedy is in danger of being overshadowed by something sexier", but says she intends to keep watching it.

== Notes ==
- ^{a} ^{b} ^{c} ^{d} Number includes additional viewers from a 9:30 p.m. rebroadcast airing the same night on TV One Plus 1.
