= Extreme Engagement =

Australian reality show on Netflix

- Genre: Reality television
- Country of origin: Australia
- Original language: English
- No. of seasons: 1
- No. of episodes: 8

Production
- Executive producer: Vanessa Alexander
- Running time: 32–40 min

Original release
- Network: Netflix
- Release: July 12, 2019

Extreme Engagement is a 2019 Australian reality television series on Netflix. The premise revolves around a couple, Tim Noonan and PJ Madam, going on a year-long trip to find out whether they should really get married or not after Tim proposes to her. They try to get to know each other by learning about marriage from the most remote places of the world, and visiting different cultures, learning about how marriage is regarded there, and the ceremonies and rituals that surrounds it.

The full season of Extreme Engagement consisting of 8 episodes was released on July 12, 2019.

== Cast ==
- Tim Noonan
- PJ Madam

== Release ==
It was released on July 12, 2019 on Netflix streaming.

== Episodes ==
No.	Title	Directed by	Original release date
1	"Like a Woman Possessed"	PJ Madam	July 12, 2019
2	"Love & Other Bruises"	PJ Madam	July 12, 2019
3	"Ruffling Feathers"	PJ Madam	July 12, 2019
4	"Cold Feet"	PJ Madam	July 12, 2019
5	"Hotbed"	PJ Madam	July 12, 2019
6	"The Crying Game"	PJ Madam	July 12, 2019
7	"Blurred Vision"	PJ Madam	July 12, 2019
8	"In Too Deep"	PJ Madam	July 12, 2019
