= The Brokenwood Mysteries =

New Zealand television series

- Genre: Comedy drama; Crime drama; Mystery fiction; Police procedural; Whodunnit
- Directed by: Murray Keane; Mike Smith; Katie Wolfe; David De Lautour; Jacqueline Nairn; Geoff Cawthorn; Oliver Driver; Mark Beesley; Josh Frizzell; Aidee Walker; Michael Hurst
- Starring: Neill Rea; Fern Sutherland; Nic Sampson (series 1-7); Jarod Rawiri (series 7 on); Cristina Serban Ionda; Pana Hema Taylor; Rawiri Jobe
- Composers: Joel Haines; Jay Neilson; Tami Neilson
- Country of origin: New Zealand
- Original language: English
- No. of series: 12
- No. of episodes: 60

Production
- Executive producers: Kelly Martin; Sally Campbell; Andrew Szusterman; John Barnett
- Producers: Chris Bailey; Sally Campbell; Tim Balme
- Cinematography: Rewa Harre; Marty Smith
- Running time: 90-99 minutes
- Production company: South Pacific Pictures

Original release
- Network: Prime (2014–2019); Acorn TV (2021–present)
- Release: 28 September 2014 – present

The Brokenwood Mysteries is a New Zealand television detective whodunnit comedy-drama series that premiered on Prime (now Sky Open) in 2014. Each of the first six series comprises four episodes. From Series 7, seasons were extended to six episodes. The programme is set in the fictitious New Zealand town of Brokenwood in the North Island and is filmed in greater Auckland. Tim Balme is the current showrunner, having conceived the series, while also working as head writer and producer.

Since 2021, the programme moved networks and now screens on TVNZ 1.

The core cast includes Neill Rea as Detective Senior Sergeant Mike Shepherd, Fern Sutherland as Detective Kristin Sims, Nic Sampson as Detective Constable Sam Breen, Cristina Ionda as Dr. Gina Kadinsky, medical examiner, and Jarod Rawiri as Detective Constable Daniel Chalmers.

== Synopsis ==
Detective Inspector Mike Shepherd is sent from Auckland to Brokenwood to investigate a local police officer. With a possible murder investigation underway that might link the two, Shepherd takes charge. After the investigation, Shepherd reassesses his life and decides to stay on indefinitely, even though it means a demotion to Detective Senior Sergeant. Brokenwood is a seemingly quiet country town where Shepherd, who has an unconventional approach to police work, is assisted by local Detective Kristin Sims, who is precise and efficient at her job, to solve murders. As the series progresses, the working relationship between the two moves from rocky to functional as they begin to appreciate each other's talents.

== Setting ==
The fictional town of Brokenwood has a population of about 5,000 and is located some 20 kilometres (12 miles) from the coast. It is in a farming area, with crops ranging from wheat to local wine, and the surrounding area is home to many people who have escaped city life (from retirees to alternative lifestylers). Though the exact location of Brokenwood is not stated, it was largely written and filmed in small towns immediately to the north of Auckland. The real-life town of Warkworth doubles as Brokenwood, and the Brokenwood Police Station is a 1911 building that was formerly the Helensville Post Office. In "Sour Grapes", Shepherd and Sims are seen travelling into Auckland across the Auckland Harbour Bridge, which would confirm that Brokenwood is also located to the north of the city. In the same episode, it is mentioned that it takes two and a half hours by road to get from Brokenwood to Auckland. This would put Brokenwood considerably farther north than either Warkworth or Helensville. A map on the police station wall covers much of Whangarei District, from southern Bream Bay north to Matapouri, and another map shown in "Catch of the Day" locates Brokenwood close to the settlement of Whangārei Heads, at the northern end of Bream Bay.

== Cast ==
=== Main ===
- Neill Rea as Detective Inspector Mike Shepherd: a detective who decided to settle down in Brokenwood for a more peaceful life. He has many personal secrets, including several marriages, and a nephew with Down syndrome, with a love for country music and for his 1971 Holden Kingswood classic car. He often pursues criminals in a way that seems odd to his colleagues, for instance by talking to dead bodies.
- Fern Sutherland as Detective Kristin Sims: a cynical and intelligent young woman who has had many dating misfortunes. She is often irritated by Shepherd's methods and his blunt manner, but she gradually learns to appreciate his skills.
- Nic Sampson as Detective Constable Sam Breen (series 1-7): a young officer who often has embarrassing or awkward visits with suspects. His girlfriend Roxy gets a new job in the Solomon Islands and Breen moves away in the beginning of series 7.
- Jarod Rawiri as Detective Constable Daniel Chalmers (series 7-present): Chalmers replaces Breen after Breen moves to the Solomon Islands. Chalmers is Māori and an experienced former uniformed officer, and brings a no-nonsense style to the Brokenwood CIB.
- Cristina Ionda as Dr. Gina Kadinsky, the medical examiner. She is a highly eccentric Russian woman who often talks about how things were in Russia and doesn't quite understand "the English humour". She drops frequent hints that she is attracted to Shepherd, an attraction that is not reciprocated.

=== Recurring ===
- Elizabeth McRae as Mrs. Jean Marlowe (series 2–7): a kindly older woman who often engages in gossip after a murder.
- Pana Hema Taylor as Jared Morehu (series 1–3; guest series 5; series 6): Shepherd's Māori neighbour. As a local who has many friends and interests, he often finds himself involved in murder investigations.
- Colin Moy as Simon Hughes: the senior police superintendent/commander (exact rank is uncertain) for the region and a close friend of DSS Shepherd.
- Karl Willetts as Frankie "Frodo" Oades: a former mechanic who later owns Frodo's Coffee trailer/cart.
- Jason Hoyte as Ray Neilson (series 2–present): the proprietor of several local pubs, including The Frog and Cheetah, and the owner of Porky Pigeon Pizzeria.
- Tracy Lee Gray as Trudy Neilson (series 3-4, 6-present): Ray Neilson's sister, co-proprietor of the hotels, and one-time resident of the Brokenwood Women's Prison.
- Shane Cortese as Dennis Buchanan (series 2–present): a canny and suave defence lawyer who often crosses swords with the police.
- Zara Cormack as Kimberly Mason, Frodo's not-quite girlfriend.
- Roy Ward as Reverend Lucas Greene (series 2–3, 5-present): a local Anglican priest who thinks well of others out of Christian charity.
- Phil Peleton as Neil Bloom (series 1-10): a local pharmacist and later mayor of Brokenwood.
- Rawiri Jobe as Kahu Taylor (series 4–5): Jared's cousin (or rather, Jared is his "brother's cousin", invariably provoking the question "how does that work?"). He's a self-employed plumber.
- Kauri Williams as Todd Taylor (series 7-present): the nephew of Walter Elliott, also related to Kahu Taylor and Jared Morehu.
- Cameron Rhodes as Dr Roger Plummer (series 3, 7-present): the local psychiatrist, member of volunteer fire-brigade, musical theatre society and lover of fine red wine.
- Ascia Maybury as Dr Abbi Carlton (series 3-present): the doctor of the local Brokenwood hospital.
- Bronwyn Bradley as Mrs. Becky Baker (series 8-present).

=== Guests ===
- Ben Barrington ("Leather & Lace")
- Amanda Billing ("Over Her Dead Body")
- Ken Blackburn as Edward ("Catch of the Day", "The Killing Machine", and "As If Nothing Had Happened")
- Alison Bruce ("The Dark Angel")
- John Callen ("A Real Page Turner")
- Lisa Chappell ("Good as Gold")
- Shane Cortese ("Catch of the Day" and "A Merry Bloody Christmas")
- Kimberley Crossman ("Death n Bass")
- Josephine Davison ("Sour Grapes")
- Stuart Devenie ("As If Nothing Had Happened")
- Mike Edward ("Blood and Water" and "The Scarecrow")
- Peter Elliott ("Sour Grapes")
- David Fane ("The Killing Machine")
- JJ Fong ("Over Her Dead Body")
- Michael Galvin ("The Ghost in You")
- Rebecca Gibney as Tabatha Shepherd
- Mark Hadlow ("The Garotte and the Vinkelbraun")
- Miranda Harcourt ("To Die or Not to Die")
- Peter Hayden ("A Merry Bloody Christmas")
- Theresa Healey ("Over Her Dead Body")
- Laura Hill ("Over Her Dead Body" and "The Killing Machine")
- Chris Hobbs ("The Killing Machine")
- Xavier Horan ("Leather & Lace")
- Anna Jullienne ("Day of the Dead")
- Nicola Kawana ("Over Her Dead Body" and "A Merry Bloody Christmas")
- Michelle Langstone ("Going to the Dogs")
- Robyn Malcolm ("To Die or Not to Die")
- Ian Mune ("As If Nothing Had Happened")
- Miriama McDowell ("Blood and Water", "Hunting the Stag" and "Here's to You, Mrs. Robinson")
- Mark Mitchinson ("Over Her Dead Body")
- Jacqueline Nairn ("Stone Cold Dead")
- Rachel Nash ("Scared to Death")
- Dean O'Gorman ("The Dark Angel")
- Ingrid Park ("Catch of the Day", "As If Nothing Had Happened" and "Tontine")
- Bree Peters ("Three Coins in a Fountain")
- Donogh Rees ("Playing the Lie")
- Jodie Rimmer ("Leather & Lace", "To Die or Not to Die" and "Blood Pink")
- Ilona Rodgers ("Tontine")
- Emmett Skilton ("The Black Widower")
- Esther Stephens ("Fall From Grace")
- Olivia Tennet ("Scared to Death")
- Roz Turnbull ("Playing the Lie")
- Calvin Tuteao ("Playing the Lie")
- Jared Turner ("Hunting the Stag")
- Bronwyn Turei ("Blood Pink")
- Aidee Walker ("The Dark Angel")
- Catherine Wilkin ("As If Nothing Had Happened")
- Katie Wolfe ("The Black Widower")
- Tandi Wright ("The Dark Angel")
- Sara Wiseman ("Here's to You, Mrs. Robinson")

== Casting changes ==
Nic Sampson, the actor who played D.C. Sam Breen, left the show to move back to the United Kingdom. His character was replaced by D.C. Daniel Chalmers (played by Jarod Rawiri). who was introduced in series 7 episode 2.

== Episodes ==
=== Series overview ===
Series	Episodes	Originally released	
Series	Episodes	First released	Last released
1	4	28 September 2014	19 October 2014
2	4	27 September 2015	18 October 2015
3	4	30 October 2016	20 November 2016
4	4	29 October 2017	19 November 2017
5	4	28 October 2018	18 November 2018
6	4	10 November 2019	1 December 2019
7	6	29 March 2021	3 May 2021
8	6	1 July 2022	1 August 2022
9	6	10 April 2023	15 May 2023
10	6	29 April 2024	3 June 2024
11	6	21 April 2025	26 May 2025
12	6	6 April 2026	11 May 2026

=== Series 1 (2014) ===
No. overall	No. in series	Title	Directed by	Written by	Original release date	N.Z. viewers (thousand)
1	1	"Blood & Water"	Mike Smith	Tim Balme & Philip Dalkin	28 September 2014	191.34
Detective Inspector Mike Shepherd is sent to Brokenwood to investigate the death of a farmer whose body has been found by two local fishermen.
2	2	"Sour Grapes"	Josh Frizzell	Tim Balme	5 October 2014	131.25
The annual Brokenwood wine show is disrupted when the guest judge, a well-known wine critic, is found dead in a fermentation vat.
3	3	"Playing the Lie"	Michael Hurst	James Griffin	12 October 2014	164.59
A morning round of golf for several prominent members of the Brokenwood Golf Club is interrupted when one of the club's organisation committee is found dead in a sand bunker, her face covered in blisters.
4	4	"Hunting the Stag"	Mike Smith	Tim Balme	19 October 2014	141.98
A stag party in two senses of the word as three friends, one of whom is about to be married, go deer hunting in the bush, but only two return— the groom-to-be having been shot in the head.

=== Series 2 (2015) ===
No. overall	No. in series	Title	Directed by	Written by	Original release date	N.Z. viewers (thousand)
5	1	"Leather & Lace"	Mike Smith	Nick Ward & Tim Balme	27 September 2015	116.16
The Brokenwood rugby club's coach is found dead— naked and tied to the goalposts. A second body is soon discovered.
6	2	"To Die or Not to Die"	Murray Keane	Tim Balme	4 October 2015	97.16
A cast member in The Brokenwood Theatre Society's production of Hamlet collapses and dies after a performance. But the smell of poison leads Shepherd to believe that he has not "shuffled off this mortal coil" without help.
7	3	"Catch of the Day"	Mike Smith	Greg McGee	11 October 2015	109.73
When a severed human hand is discovered in a crayfisherman's catch, Shepherd and his team need to discover whose it is and whether its owner is still alive.
8	4	"Blood Pink"	Josh Frizzell	Tim Balme	18 October 2015	117.114
A touring musician is found electrocuted in what initially looks to be a suicide. As Shepherd investigates, he finds things are murkier than they first appeared.

=== Series 3 (2016) ===
No. overall	No. in series	Title	Directed by	Written by	Original release date
9	1	"The Black Widower"	Mark Beesley	Tim Balme	30 October 2016
A "Lord of the Ringz" tour comes across the wife of the tour guide, wrapped in fake cobwebs and poisoned with spider venom.
10	2	"Over Her Dead Body"	Murray Keane	Tim Balme	6 November 2016
During the funeral for beloved local poet Declan O'Grady, an unexpected turn of events reveals that his coffin has been occupied by the corpse of an unidentified young woman. As the investigation progresses, Shepherd is led into the murky world of a local Cluedo club.
11	3	"The Killing Machine"	Mike Smith	Greg McGee	13 November 2016
A thief's corpse is found at a local auto repair shop, followed by the murder of the people who worked there. As Shepherd unravels the case, he realizes that the real crime may not be anything as pedestrian as theft.
12	4	"A Merry Bloody Christmas"	Murray Keane	Tim Balme	20 November 2016
The beloved mayor of Brokenwood is found brutally murdered in a Santa costume and his girlfriend stuffed in the chimney... also in a Santa costume.

=== Series 4 (2017) ===
No. overall	No. in series	Title	Directed by	Written by	Original release date
13	1	"Fall From Grace"	Helena Brooks	Pip Hall	29 October 2017
When Kristin, Breen, and Gina celebrate Mike’s birthday with a picnic in Brokenwood Domain, they are witness to a fatal skydiving accident; the victim was Kristin's ex-boyfriend.
14	2	"Stone Cold Dead"	Murray Keane	Tim Balme	5 November 2017
Charity Highmore-Browne is the owner and curator of Brokenwood's Historic Village. A stickler for all things Victorian, Charity lives in a time warp. Her sudden death by an arrow brings Mike and his team into the realm of New Zealand's colonial past as they deal with a blacksmith, a missionary, and the local postmaster.
15	3	"The Scarecrow"	Josh Frizzell	Greg McGee	12 November 2017
Philip Henderson stands next to an impressive scarecrow amidst a field of damaged vegetation. His whole crop has failed. The scarecrow may have kept the birds away but this catastrophe is something bigger.
16	4	"As If Nothing Had Happened"	Mark Beesley	Tim Balme	19 November 2017
Sunset Manor is a rest home in Brokenwood for the aged and infirm. The new resident is Edward Alderston. Having recently lost his wife, his family has decided Sunset Manor is the best place for him, especially now that Alzheimer's is taking hold.

=== Series 5 (2018) ===
No. overall	No. in series	Title	Directed by	Written by	Original release date
17	1	"Scared to Death"	Murray Keane	Tim Balme	28 October 2018
A man is found dead on The Ghost Train. Can one die of fright or is there a more human explanation for his demise?
18	2	"Bride Not to Be"	Katie Wolfe	Pip Hall & Tim Balme	4 November 2018
The Detectives must unravel the mystery of how a bride-to-be ended up dead in the river during her bachelorette party.
19	3	"Tontine"	Thomas Robins	James Griffin & Tim Balme	11 November 2018
When Lester Nyman reaches the top of a local mountain after a gruelling ride and suffers a massive coronary, it doesn't seem suspicious. But when Gina reveals his toxicology showed astronomical levels of caffeine in his system, Mike starts to look more closely.
20	4	"The Dark Angel"	Mark Beesley	Tim Balme	18 November 2018
At a wing in an abandoned mental health facility, a young couple stumble upon the body of an elderly man strapped to a trolley with electrodes connected to his temples. It would seem he was the victim of electrocution.

=== Series 6 (2019) ===
No. overall	No. in series	Title	Directed by	Written by	Original release date
21	1	"The Power of Steam"	Oliver Driver	Tim Balme and Nic Sampson	10 November 2019
After a murder at the Brokenwood Steampunk event, Mike and his team are thrown into a world of dress-up and escapism where the suspects all have alter-egos.
22	2	"A Real Page Turner"	Aidee Walker	Fiona Samuel	17 November 2019
World-renowned crime-writing author Jack Rudd visits Brokenwood to give a reading from his latest novel at the local book club - but he never leaves, falling victim to a method of murder portrayed in his own book.
23	3	"Dead Men Don't Shoot Ducks"	Murray Keane	Tim Balme	24 November 2019
When an animal activist is killed on the first day of duck hunting season, Mike and the team must determine whether it was an accidental shooting or something more sinister.
24	4	"Dead and Buried"	Katie Wolfe	Tim Balme	1 December 2019
Mike and the team are reacquainted with some familiar faces when investigating a suspicious suicide at the Brokenwood Women's Prison.

=== Series 7 (2021) ===
No. overall	No. in series	Title	Directed by	Written by	Original release date
25	1	"The Garotte and the Vinkelbraun"	Katie Wolfe	Timothy Balme	29 March 2021
One of the celebrities from the show All Things Old and Beautiful is found dead in his antique garotte torture chair. It's up to Mike and his team to figure out who killed him.
26	2	"The Witches of Brokenwood"	Aidee Walker	Sarah-Kate Lynch	5 April 2021
The Brokenwood Health Retreat proves rather unhealthy for one unfortunate visitor, leaving Mike and the team with the very tricky case to solve.
27	3	"Dog Day Morning"	Mark Beesley	Timothy Balme, Nic Sampson	12 April 2021
When four masked men attempt to rob the Brokenwood Savings Bank, it's up to Mike and the team to determine which one of them pulled the trigger and killed the bank manager.
28	4	"Something Nasty in the Market"	Geoffrey Cawthorn	Fiona Samuel	19 April 2021
Mike, Kristin, and the team investigate the murder of a celebrity chef and Farmer's Market owner who staggers into the crowd with a pitchfork fatally embedded in her back.
29	5	"Exposed to the Light"	Aidee Walker	Roy Ward	26 April 2021
A fundraising evening at the historic Brokenwood Empire Cinema turns deadly when a fire breaks out; when the smoke clears, a local businessman is found strangled.
30	6	"Here's to You, Mrs. Robinson"	Mike Smith	Timothy Balme	3 May 2021
When Mike mysteriously leaves Brokenwood on other police business, Kristin is left to lead the investigation into a 1970s party where two party-goers wind up dead.

=== Series 8 (2022) ===
- Episode one aired on Friday, 1 July on Acorn in North America, with all the following episodes airing on the Mondays following (4 July, etc).

No. overall	No. in series	Title	Directed by	Written by	Original release date
31	1	"From the Cradle to the Grave"	Josh Frizzell	Timothy Balme	1 July 2022
Mike and the team get a lesson in local history when the Brokenwood museum uncovers a dead body in the most unlikely of places.
32	2	"Death n Bass"	Mike Smith	James Griffin	4 July 2022
The Brokenwood police are called in to investigate a murder at a music festival, where it appears the victim was killed by sound.
33	3	"Spark to a Flame"	Jacqueline Nairn	Roy Ward	11 July 2022
Shepherd and the gang are called to the remote community of beaches at Pateke Point, where a local resident was found bludgeoned to death by an unknown blunt object and locked inside a house not her own.
34	4	"Three Coins in a Fountain"	David De Lautour	Timothy Balme	18 July 2022
When the world champion of the bar game Spoofing is found stabbed on a fountain, the Brokenwood detectives must determine who was willing to commit murder in order to win at all costs.
35	5	"Good as Gold"	Caroline Bell-Booth	Sarah-Kate Lynch	25 July 2022
A 160-year-old family feud over an avocado-sized gold nugget becomes the main motive for murder when a modern-day cowgirl is gunned down.
36	6	"Four Fires and a Funeral"	Michael Hurst	Timothy Balme & Nic Sampson	1 August 2022
The charred remains of a body are discovered in a burned out rural shed leading to the investigation of a run of "accidental" deaths, all attended by the Brokenwood Fire Brigade.

=== Series 9 (2023) ===
• Episode 1 began streaming on Acorn in North America on Monday, 10 April 2023 with each of the rest of the episodes released on successive Mondays.

No. overall	No. in series	Title	Directed by	Written by	Original release date
37	1	"Brokenwood: The Musical"	Katie Wolfe	Tim Balme	10 April 2023
A musical theatre performance reenacting Brokenwood's history goes horrifically awry when the composer is electrocuted on stage. But was it murder or just an unfortunate accident?
38	2	"Old Blood Money"	David De Lautour	Roy Ward	17 April 2023
Mike and the team discover more than one dead body, and a significant amount of family rivalry, in the manor house where a pair of aging siblings live.
39	3	"Nun of the Above"	Sima Vaele Urale	Sarah-Kate Lynch	24 April 2023
The team at Brokenwood must navigate a group of nuns who have taken a vow of silence when a member of their order is strangled on their way to chapel.
40	4	"Going to the Dogs"	Mike Smith	Mike Smith and Tim Balme	1 May 2023
Mike, Kristin and Chalmers must determine who wanted a local vet nurse dead when she uncovers a doping scandal and gets murdered for knowing too much.
41	5	"Shot of Love"	Jacqueline Nairn	Tim Balme	8 May 2023
A death at a motel at first looks like an accident, but something is not right in the stories the guests tell.
42	6	"Motorcycle Mamas"	Mike Smith	Kathryn Burnett and Tim Balme	15 May 2023
A motorcycle gang comes to Brokenwood to celebrate the wedding of one of its members, Debbie. But a tragic death saw a couple stop the party.

=== Series 10 (2024) ===
No. overall	No. in series	Title	Directed by	Written by	Original release date
43	1	"Brokenwood-o-saurus"	Mike Smith	Mike Smith and Timothy Balme	29 April 2024
After dinosaur fossils are discovered in the foothills of Brokenwood, the town buzzes about the potential boost for tourism. But when a paleontologist turns up dead, the future doesn't look so rosy.
44	2	"Day of the Dead"	Geoff Cawthorn	Tania Klouwens and Tim Balme	6 May 2024
When the Brokenwood Small Business Association stage a Mexican "Day of the Dead" night market, they don't bargain on an actual dead body becoming part of the festivities.
45	3	"Publish or Be Damned"	Awanui Simich-Pene	Roy Ward and Laura Hill	13 May 2024
A writers retreat on a picturesque estate generates ample inspiration when the mentor, Dame Audrey McKinnon, is found deceased, floating under a nearby waterfall.
46	4	"Love You to Death"	Katie Wolfe	Tim Balme	20 May 2024
Brokenwood's favorite dentist, Sonny Lyman, is the subject of Jools Fahey's amorous attentions. When Sonny's wife is found gassed in an oven, Jools becomes the prime suspect.
47	5	"The House of Screams"	David De Lautour	Nic Sampson	27 May 2024
A local scare attraction is the venue for a murder when a teenager is found with a sickle through his neck.
48	6	"Three Gold Leaves of Jesus"	Jacqueline Nairn	Timothy Balme	3 June 2024
While a visiting theatrical troupe puts on a nativity play at St. Judas, a precious holy relic goes missing, and the actor playing Jesus is killed.

=== Series 11 (2025) ===
No. overall	No. in series	Title	Directed by	Written by	Original release date
49	1	"The Ghost in You"	Mike Smith	Timothy Balme	21 April 2025
When a fan of the Stolen Arrow band is found dead, the detectives must search for answers in the past.
50	2	"Sudden Death Round"	Ian Hughes	Laura Hill and Roy Ward	28 April 2025
Ryan Osbourne, a popular radio host, is killed in an explosion at the swimming pool shed at his old high school. The investigation reveals a lot of old grudges and as many suspects.
51	3	"All Hallows Eve"	Jacqueline Nairn	Tania Klouwens and Timothy Balme	5 May 2025
A man seeking to speak to his great grandmother is killed during a séance on All Hallows' Eve. The victim appears to have been stabbed but no weapon is found in the room or on the guests.
52	4	"How the Other Half Dies"	Mike Smith	Mike Smith and Timothy Balme	12 May 2025
When one of Brokenwood's wealthiest residents is found dead, crushed by a chandelier, the rest of them start to act very strangely.
53	5	"The End of the Line"	Awanui Simich-Pene	Roy Ward and Laura Hill	19 May 2025
During a school camping trip, Hannah Winton, a science teacher, is found dead tied to a zip-line.
54	6	"An Oades to Christmas"	Katie Wolfe	Tim Balme	26 May 2025
A man dressed as Santa is found dead in a remote location, and the situation gets complicated by the entire Oades family.

=== Series 12 (2026) ===
No. overall	No. in series	Title	Directed by	Written by	Original release date
55	1	"They're Out There Alright"	Geoffrey Cawthorn	Timothy Balme	6 April 2026
When a chef is found dead in a crop circle, alien abduction theories spark as a UFO convention arrives in Brokenwood; but after another death occurs, Mike and Kristin investigate whether the truth is extraterrestrial or all too human.
56	2	"Angels and Demons"	Peter Burger	Timothy Balme	13 April 2026
Unconventional priest Canon Zach Mantell brings fresh energy to Brokenwood's parish. When his wife is found dead in the church cemetery, Mike and Kristin uncover evidence suggesting murder.
57	3	"Midnight in the Garden"	Mike Smith	Tania Klouwens	20 April 2026
A lavish New Year's Eve masquerade comes to a deadly end.
58	4	"No Return Ticket"	Ghazaleh Gol	Laura Hill and Roy Ward	27 April 2026
A bride is murdered and thrown from a vintage train during a celebration. Mike and his team investigate, uncovering old rivalries and family tensions to identify the killer among the passengers.
59	5	"Death Has Four Strings"	Joshua Frizzell	James Griffin	4 May 2026
A property developer's murder with a broken ukulele disrupts Brokenwood's orchestra rehearsal. Mike and Kristin investigate band members' grudges as suspects increase.
60	6	"Diamonds are a Girl's Best Friend"	Jacqueline Nairn	Timothy Balme	11 May 2026
A murder in Ray's restaurant makes Trudy the prime suspect.

== Ratings ==
=== Series 1 ===
Episode	New Zealand ratings		
Episode	Original air date	Live	Rank
Episode	Original air date	Viewers (thousands)	Night
"Blood & Water"	28 September 2014	191.34	5
"Sour Grapes"	5 October 2014	131.25	
"Playing the Lie"	12 October 2014	164.59	5
"Hunting the Stag"	19 October 2014	141.98	

=== Series 2 ===
Episode	New Zealand ratings		
Episode	Original air date	Live	Rank
Episode	Original air date	Viewers (thousands)	Night
"Leather & Lace"	27 September 2015	116.16	5
"To Die or Not to Die"	4 October 2015	97.16	
"Catch of the Day"	11 October 2015	109.73	5
"Blood Pink"	18 October 2015	117.11	5

== International ==
- In France the series is shown on France 3 with a viewer average of 3.4 million each episode and has been retitled Brokenwood.
- The series has also been shown in Denmark, the United States, Australia and Italy.
- The series premiered in Australia on 13th Street on 27 January 2016. It is also shown on the 9Gem channel.
- The series premiered in the United States and Canada on Acorn TV the same day as New Zealand as one of the US co-producers and broadcasters.
- The series airs on Knowledge Network, the public television service of British Columbia.
- The series airs on television on several PBS stations. The series later premiered on Ovation (American TV channel) on 28 June 2021.
- The series started being shown in the United Kingdom and Ireland on the Drama Channel in February 2017.
- The series were shown in Bulgaria by Fox Crime Bulgaria in March 2017.
- The series has been shown in Finland by YLE, the public broadcasting company, from 2017 on. In Finland the series title goes by the local name of "Murhia ja kantrimusiikkia", meaning "Murders and country-music". Episodes are shown in two pieces, ie 1/2 and 2/2. One half episode lasts for 45 minutes and has no ads. Episodes are shown every weekday, usually for the first time in traditional 17:10 slot.
- The series premiered in Italy on Giallo on 16 April 2016 titled I misteri di Brokenwood.
- The series premiered in Germany on Das Erste on 21 July 2019 titled Brokenwood - Mord in Neuseeland.
- The series premiered in Belgium on één, on 8 May 2020.
- The series has also been shown in Czech TV Prima titled Vraždy v Brokenwoodu.
- In the Netherlands it is shown on BBC First.
- Shown in Japan on AXN.
- In Norway the national broadcaster NRK has been broadcasting the series since April 2019

== Reception and awards ==
Critical response to the series has been generally good, with many reviewers impressed by the plots and the uniquely laconic dialogue. The two-hour length (broadcast length with ads) of episodes has been mentioned by some as too long for such a series. However, for most of the world that receive the show on streamers and ad free, the 90 minute length provides a satisfying investment, offering more twists and turns than the usual commercial one hour format allows.

James Croot in Stuff praised the series in the following terms: 'series head writer Tim Balme does a terrific job of keeping the audience guessing as to the killer while carving out a few nice character moments and a rich vein of humour' and that 'with its “gentle” approach to murders, twisty mysteries and warm, witty and relatively uncomplicated regulars, it’s easy to see why Brokenwood has gained such a global following.

In contrast, writing in the New Zealand Herald, critic Colin Hogg panned the series, stating that it was "a local version aiming at that grand TV detective tradition" but that its "Dialogue is clichéd, the acting aches and the locations are boring." International television website "The Medium is Not Enough" was also generally negative in its review, describing the series as a "genteel, New Zealand drama designed to appeal to perhaps an older demographic that likes comfortable murder-mysteries and to New Zealanders eager to watch anything that’s actually set in New Zealand and stars New Zealanders."

Christine Tidball, writing for the entertainment website Cheese on Toast was kinder, rating the series "charming, without being cloying, very well-written (thanks to Tim Balme) and funny, but not too funny [...] It’s also engaging, full of twists, and will keep you guessing right till the end."

As the series has progressed, reviews have become more positive. DVD review website High Def Standard described the first series as "uniquely thrilling TV" and "a New Zealand Midsomer Murders that isn’t afraid to venture off into Twin Peaks territory every now and again." The Manawatu Standard's Malcolm Hopwood enjoyed the series but lamented episode length: "The Brokenwood Mysteries (Prime Sundays) is like our TPP negotiations. They are long, energy-sapping but satisfying if you're still awake after two hours." He added that the series was "intriguing, confusing and exhausting", and that it "deserves our support but it needs to be recorded and watched in small chunks." Michael Reuben, writing for blu-ray.com, rated series one at 4 stars out of 5.

The Brokenwood Mysteries received SWANZ Best Script Award from The NZ Writer's Guild for Tim Balme's script 'Sour Grapes' in 2015.

The Brokenwood Mysteries received a bronze world medal at the New York Festival's International Television and Film Awards in 2014.

The Brokenwood Mysteries received a silver world medal at the New York Festival's International Television and Film Awards in 2018.

The Edgar Allan Poe Award - Nomination - Episode 3 Season 7 - 2022

The Brokenwood Mysteries received a bronze world medal at the New York Festival's International Television and Film Awards in 2023.

== Cars ==
Shepherd's car is a 1971 Holden Kingswood (HG series). It has a cassette player for his country music cassettes. In Season 12, Episode 5, Shepherd considered selling his Kingwood due to its penchant for breaking down.

== Music ==
Brokenwood Mysteries showcases New Zealand's own country and alternative rock music. In the first season, Shepherd is introduced as a fan of country and western music, sharing the music with Sims while driving around in his car. The music he listens to and the background music of the show are all New Zealand performers. Season two, which climaxed with the death of country singer Holly Collins, was scored by Canadian-born Kiwi-based Tami Neilson and her brother Jay Neilson. Three volumes of soundtracks covering season 1, 2, and 6 of the show have been released digitally on Apple Music, Amazon and Spotify.

With the exception of Season Two, all episodes have been scored by Joel Haines, including many original compositions.

New Zealand musicians exhibited on Brokenwood include Tami Neilson, Mel Parsons, Delaney Davidson, Barry Saunders, the Harbour Union, Barnaby Weir of the Black Seeds, the Unfaithful Way, and Jenny Mitchell. Other singers are Marlon Williams, the Warratahs, Bannerman, The DeSotos, Aldous Harding, Jackie Bristow, The Fables, Ghost Town, Reb Fountain, The Eastern, Carla Werner and Esther Stephens.

== Home releases ==
Title	Set details	Blu-ray and DVD release dates			Special features
Title	Set details	Region A/1	Region 2	Region 4	Special features
The Brokenwood Mysteries - Series One	Discs: 2; Episodes: 4	7 July 2015	14 August 2017	16 December 2014	Interviews with the stars and head writer
The Brokenwood Mysteries — Series Two	Discs: 2; Episodes: 4	3 May 2016	14 August 2017	25 November 2015	
The Brokenwood Mysteries — Series Three	Discs: 2; Episodes: 4	21 March 2017	20 November 2017	24 November 2016	
The Brokenwood Mysteries — Series Four	Discs: 2; Episodes: 4	27 March 2018	18 December 2017	7 December 2017	Interviews with the stars
The Brokenwood Mysteries — Series Five	Discs: 2; Episodes: 4	5 March 2019	17 December 2018	6 December 2018	Behind the scenes featurette; Picture gallery
The Brokenwood Mysteries — Series Six	Discs: 2; Episodes: 4	26 May 2020	17 February 2020	19 May 2020	
The Brokenwood Mysteries — Series Seven	Discs: 3; Episodes: 6	20 July 2021	24 May 2021	8 July 2021	TBD
The Brokenwood Mysteries — Series Eight	Discs: 3; Episodes: 6	8 November 2022	7 November 2022	21 October 2022	TBD
