= Alison Bruce =

New Zealand actress

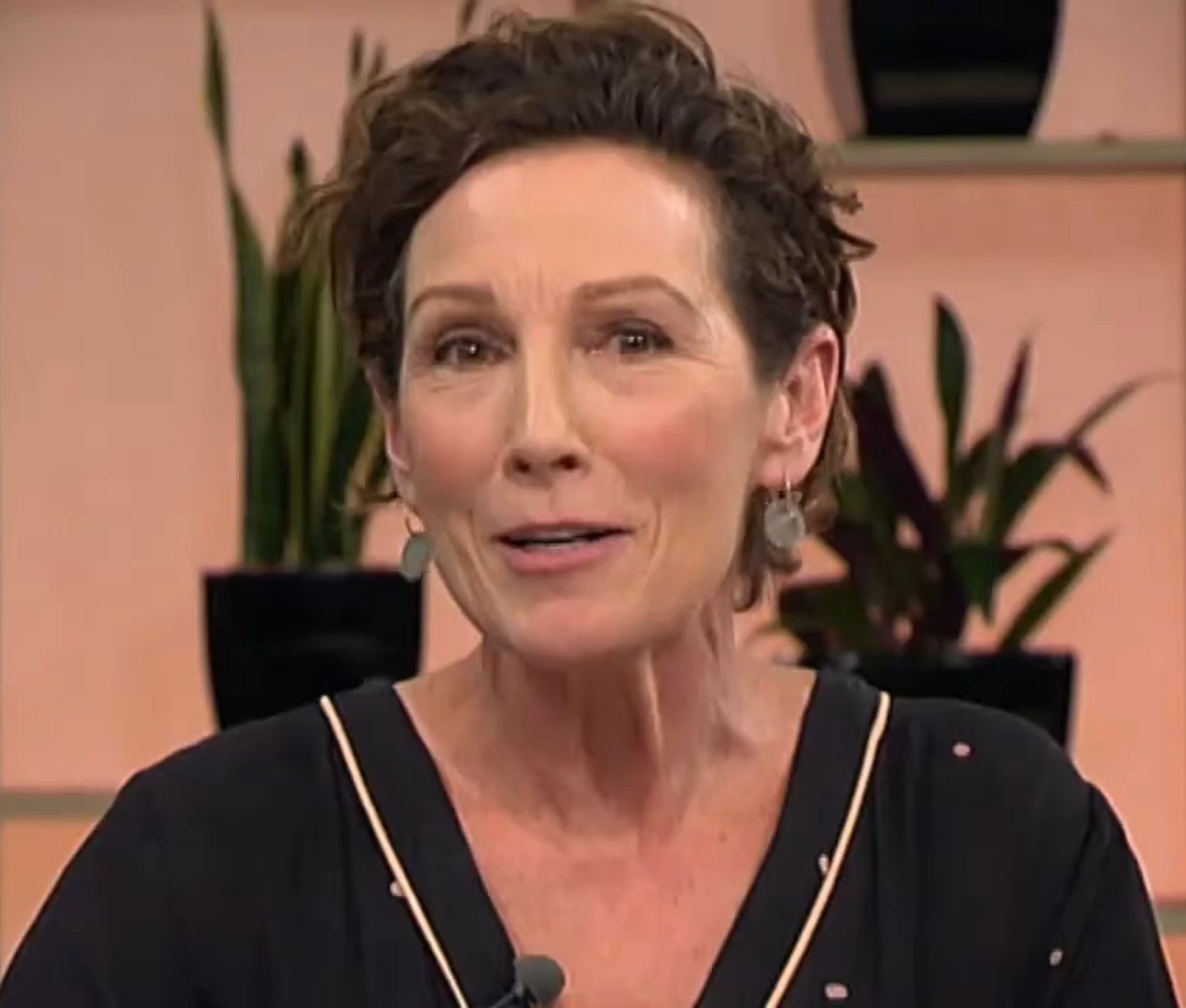
- Bruce in 2018
- Born: Tanzania, Africa
- Occupation: Actress
- Years active: 1986–present

Alison Bruce is a New Zealand television and film actress, who starred in the 2001 feature film Magik and Rose. She also appeared in the teen series Being Eve and Xena: Warrior Princess, and had a recurring role as Simula in Young Hercules.

== Early life and education ==
Bruce was born in Tanzania to a Scottish father and an English mother. Her family moved to New Zealand when she was around eight.

She trained at Auckland's Theatre Corporate in the early 1980s.

== Career ==
Bruce soon began a busy acting career with stage roles that include starring in Hamlet (as Ophelia) and Cyrano de Bergerac (as Roxane).

She made her screen debut in the 1984 teleplay The Minders. Since then she has acted in more than 30 screen roles, including sizeable parts in two feature films: the 1990 chase comedy User Friendly, in which her character steals a keenly-sought dog statue from a crazed former boss; and 2001 feature Magik and Rose, which Bruce later described as a turning point in terms of the type of roles she is offered. The comedy-drama saw Bruce playing Magik, a fortune-teller who arrives in a Kiwi town in a house-truck, seeking the daughter she gave up for adoption many years before.

Bruce also acted in the based-on-a-true-story feature The World's Fastest Indian (as a doctor) and the short film Mon Desir, which was selected to play in the Un Certain Regard section of the 1992 Cannes Film Festival.

=== Television ===
Bruce's television roles include the eccentric mother of Eve, the main character in award-winning series Being Eve, and the hospital personal assistant who falls pregnant in Mercy Peak. The latter part would win Bruce two consecutive New Zealand television awards for best supporting actor. She also had a number of small roles on the Xena: Warrior Princess and Hercules: The Legendary Journeys franchise, including playing an Amazon Queen (Queen Melosa). Bruce enjoyed the chance to take part in fight scenes, and "do all this stuff you normally don't get to do in television".

Bruce played estranged mother to a family of gods in the first two seasons (2010–2011) of the television series The Almighty Johnsons, and worked with New Zealand director Jane Campion on the 2012 series Top of the Lake.

== Personal life ==
Bruce's long-term partner is casting director and actor Neill Rea. As of 2022 they were living in central Auckland.

== Filmography ==
=== Film ===
Year	Title	Role	Notes
1990	User Friendly	Augusta	
1990	An Angel at My Table	Dora	
1991	The End of the Golden Weather	Auntie Kass	
1991	Old Scores	Ngaire Morgan	
1991	Mon Desir		Short
1992	Alex	Female Journo	
1999	Willy Nilly	Carol	Short
2001	Magik and Rose	Magik	
2003	Sylvia	Elizabeth	
2004	Spooked	Sheila Miller	
2004	As Dreams Are Made On	Ruth	Short
2005	The World's Fastest Indian	Doctor	
2005	Us	Woman	Short
2006	Perfect Creature	TV Presenter	
2007	The Tattooist	Charge Nurse	
2012	Dotty	Carol	Short
2017	The Pact	Sandra	Short
2018	Sail Away	Margaret	Short, completed
2024	Tinā	Caroline	Feature film

=== Television ===
Year	Title	Role	Notes
1986	Heroes	Glenda	"2.2"
1987	Adventurer	Sovay Banks	"Sovay, Parts 1 & 2"
1990	Shark in the Park	Christina Long	"Fall from Grace"
1990	Star Runner		TV film
1993	The Rainbow Warrior	Leslie Holbrook	TV film
1994	Coverstory	Karen Parker	TV film
1995	Hercules: The Legendary Journeys	Postera	"Gladiator"
1995	Xena: Warrior Princess	Queen Melosa	"Hooves and Harlots"
1998	City Life	Katherine Dwyer	"1.15", "1.24"
1998	Shortland Street	Danni Brown / Lindsay Maguire	TV series
1998	The Chosen	Denise	TV film
1998–99	Young Hercules	Simula	Recurring role
1999	Xena: Warrior Princess	Talia	"Animal Attraction"
2000	Xena: Warrior Princess	Kahina	"Legacy"
2001–02	Mercy Peak	Louise Duval	Main role
2001–02	Being Eve	Vivienne Baxter	Main role
2006	Maddigan's Quest	Witch-Finder	"Witch-Finder"
2007	Reckless Behavior: Caught on Tape	Grace Leister	TV film
2009	Life's a Riot	Nell Edmonds	TV film
2010	Legend of the Seeker	Sister Verna	Recurring role
2010	This Is Not My Life	Jude	Recurring role
2010	Avalon High	Coach Miganov	TV film
2011–12	The Almighty Johnsons	Agnetha	Recurring role
2013	Top of the Lake	Anne-Marie	Recurring role
2014	The Kick	Sheryll Donald	TV film
2016	Hillary	Phyllis Rose	TV series
2016	Dirty Laundry	Delia	TV series
2018	The Brokenwood Mysteries	Fiona	"The Dark Angel"
2019–present	The Gulf	Sen. Sgt. Denise Abernethy	TV series
2019–20	Golden Boy	Susan	TV series, 16 episodes, 2 seasons
2020	The Wilds	Coach Ellen Rose	TV series
2020	One Lane Bridge	Lois Tremaine	TV series
2020	Mystic	Julia	TV series

== Awards and nominations ==
Year	Association	Category	Nominated work	Result
2000	New Zealand Film and TV Awards	Best Actress	Magik and Rose	Nominated
2002	New Zealand Film and TV Awards	Best Supporting Actress	Mercy Peak	Won
2005	Gemini Awards	Best Lifestyle/Practical Information Segment	ZeD, "Pumpkin Boats"	Nominated
2006	New Zealand Screen Awards	Best Performance in a Short Film	Us	Won
2010	New Zealand Film and TV Awards	Best Lead Actress in a Feature Film	Life's a Riot	Nominated
