= Neill Rea =

New Zealand actor and casting director

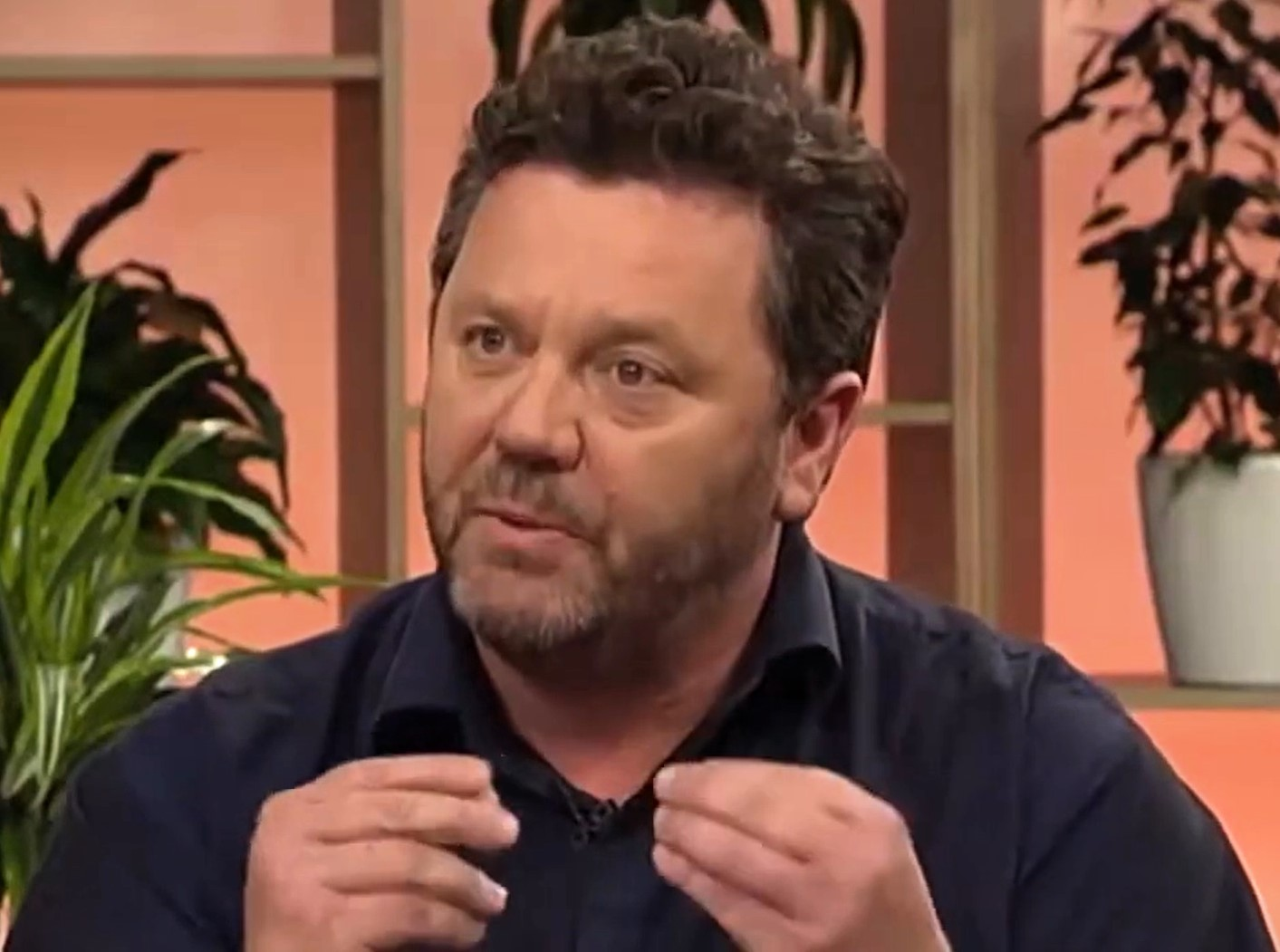
- Rea in 2017
- Occupation: Actor
- Spouse: Alison Bruce

Neill Rea is a New Zealand actor and casting director, best known for playing the lead role of detective Mike Shepherd in television police procedural The Brokenwood Mysteries.

== Career ==
Early roles included small parts in Hercules: The Legendary Journeys and Duggan, before he landed a larger part as Scotty, one of the flatmates in 1999 comedy-drama film Scarfies. Other noted roles include a semi-regular guest appearance in comedy-drama Go Girls in 2011 and 2012, and a role in 2010 film The Warrior's Way.

He plays a detective, Mike Shepherd, in the TV series The Brokenwood Mysteries, which started airing in 2014 and is ongoing as of 2025.

Apart from acting, Rea also works as a casting director, and is the owner of Auckland-based casting agency Fly Casting.

== Awards and nominations ==
- 2023: Nominated, Best Actor, New Zealand Television Awards/Ngā Taonga Whakaata O Aotearoa, for The Brokenwood Mysteries

== Personal life ==
His long-term partner is actress Alison Bruce. As of 2022 they were living in central Auckland.
