= Cristina Ionda =

New Zealand actress

- Born: Bucharest, Romania
- Other name: Cristina Serban
- Education: I.L. Caragiale Institute of Theatre and Film Arts
- Occupations: Actress, Presenter
- Years active: 2000 - present
- Spouse: George Tudor

Cristina Serban Ionda is a New Zealand-based Romanian actor and presenter best known for playing the Russian pathologist Gina Kadinsky in the New Zealand television series The Brokenwood Mysteries since 2014.

Born in Bucharest, Ionda grew up in Brașov in Transylvania, and studied for a BA in acting at the I.L. Caragiale Institute of Theatre and Film Arts (1994–1998) in Bucharest, going on to complete a postgraduate diploma in audio-visual studies. Following her experience as a townswoman on 2003's Cold Mountain she and her husband moved to New Zealand, inspired by watching a Discovery Channel documentary.

== Filmography ==
=== Film ===
Year	Title	Role	Notes
2003	Boudica	Iceni mother	('Warrior Queen' in USA)
2004	Out of Season	Molly Barlow	
2005	King Kong	theatre patron	

=== Television ===
Year	Title	Role	Notes
2013	Nothing Trivial	Lana	"Who Said 'As Long as You Know Men Are Like Children, You Know Everything?'" (S03E03)
2016	Filthy Rich	Maria	14 episodes
2014–present	The Brokenwood Mysteries	Pathologist Gina Kadinsky	Main role
