= Nude Tuesday =

2022 New Zealand comedy film

- Directed by: Armağan Ballantyne
- Screenplay by: Jackie van Beek
- Story by: Jackie van Beek; Armağan Ballantyne
- Subtitles by: New Zealand/UK version: Julia Davis; International version: Ronny Chieng Celia Pacquola
- Produced by: Nick Batzias; Emma Slade; Virginia Whitwell
- Starring: Jackie van Beek; Damon Herriman; Jemaine Clement
- Cinematography: Andrew Commis
- Edited by: Nick Meyers
- Production companies: Stan; New Zealand Film Commission; Screen Australia; Film Victoria; Firefly Films; Good Thing Production Company
- Distributed by: Madman Entertainment
- Release dates: 10 June 2022 (Sydney Film Festival); 16 June 2022 (New Zealand)
- Running time: 90 minutes
- Countries: New Zealand; Australia
- Language: Zǿbftąņlik (fictional language)

Nude Tuesday (stylised as Nûde Tuęsdäy) is a 2022 comedy film written by Armağan Ballantyne and Jackie van Beek, and directed by Ballantyne. Set on a fictional island in the Pacific Ocean, the film follows Laura and Bruno (played by van Beek and Damon Herriman respectively) as they attend a new-age retreat to save their marriage. The film's dialogue is entirely in a fictional language, with English subtitles. Three versions of the film exist: one with subtitles written by British comedian Julia Davis, one with a different set of subtitles written by Malaysian comedian Ronny Chieng and Australian comedian Celia Pacquola, and one without subtitles.

== Premise ==
Laura (Jackie Van Beek) and Bruno (Damon Herriman) live on the island of Zǿbftąņ, located in the Pacific Ocean, north-west of Hawai’i. After a disastrous work presentation and anniversary dinner with their in-laws, Laura and Bruno attempt to rekindle their marriage, by heading to Ẅønđeulä, a mountainous couples retreat run by guru Bjorg Rasmussen (Jemaine Clement).

== Cast ==
- Jackie van Beek as Laura
- Damon Herriman as Bruno
- Jemaine Clement as Bjorg Rasmussen
- Ian Zaro as Rufus
- Chelsie Preston Crayford as Julie
- Ghenoa Gela as Rakel
- Byron Coll as Finnius
- Yvette Parsons as Margaret
- Chris Bunton as Louis
- Chris Parker as Stefan
- Jodie Rimmer as Diane
- Roy Billing as Aldo
- Sarah Peirse as Felicity

== Production ==
The film's script was originally developed in English. During a phone call to Ballantyne, Jackie van Beek suggested that the film be in a gibberish, to tie in to the film's theme of miscommunication. The film was rehearsed in English based on van Beek's script, and performed in the fictional gibberish language of Zǿbftąņlik. It was shot in two locations: Auckland and the Queenstown-Lakes District of the South Island, at the Wonderland Lodge in Makarora and Cardrona.

Zǿbftąņlik is a spontaneous language created by Wellington voice coach Perry Piercy. While not a constructed language, Piercy created phonic rules inspired by Nordic languages, as she felt that it was important that all actors in the film appeared to be speaking the same language. Piercy developed the language alongside four of the actors of the film, using Fitzmaurice Voicework techniques, to make the actors feel comfortable improvising sounds in the new language. While most words are improvised, some words in Zǿbftąņlik have a set meaning, including "tula" (thank you) and "vilm" (please). Clement's character Bjorg Rasmussen occasionally uses English language phrases.

After the film was shot and edited, subtitles were added by British comedian Julia Davis. Davis worked on the subtitles over a three-month period, having never read the original screenplay. Davis' subtitles greatly differed from Ballantyne and van Beek's original script. A different set of subtitles was created by Malaysian comedian Ronny Chieng and Australian comedian Celia Pacquola. The New Zealand and United Kingdom releases of the film feature Davis' subtitles, while most other territories use the Chieng and Pacquola version. In Australia, the Sydney Film Festival release used Davis' subtitles, while its debut on streaming services will use Chieng and Pacquola's.

=== Soundtrack ===
The film's soundtrack features cover versions of Phil Phillips' "Sea of Love", Kenny Rogers and Dolly Parton's "Islands in the Stream", The Zombies' "Time of the Season" and Talking Heads' "Road to Nowhere", recorded in the fictional language of Zǿbftąņlik. The covers were primarily performed by Moniker, a group composed of indie rock band Phoenix Foundation members Lukasz Pawel Buda, Samuel Flynn Scott and Thomas Conrad Wedde, who had previously worked on the soundtrack for the film Hunt for the Wilderpeople (2016). Jemaine Clement performs vocals on the cover of "Road to Nowhere", and a song from The Weeping Jester, a fictional album performed by his character Bjorg Rasmussen. The covers' Zǿbftąņlik lyrics were supplied by Perry Piercey.

== Release ==
The film debuted on 10 June 2022 at the Sydney Film Festival, and online at the Tribeca Film Festival on 11 June 2022. It received a wide release in New Zealand cinemas on 16 June 2022, and in Australian cinemas on 23 June, followed by a streaming release on Stan on 7 July.

== Reception ==
The film received positive reviews. On the review aggregator website Rotten Tomatoes, 86% of 29 critics' reviews are positive, with an average rating of 6.9/10. The website's consensus reads: "The story may feel a bit strained at feature length, but Nude Tuesday is an impressive experimental exercise that's also frequently funny."
