= Annonay International Film Festival =

The Annonay International Festival of First Films (French: Festival international du premier film d'Annonay) is an annual film festival of debut features held in Annonay, France, launched in 1984. The festival organizer is the fr:Maison des Jeunes et de la Culture of Annonay.
