= User Friendly (film) =

- Directed by: Gregor Nicholas
- Written by: Gregor Nicholas; Norelle Scott; Frank Stark
- Produced by: Trevor Haysom; Frank Stark
- Starring: William Brandt; Alison Bruce
- Cinematography: Donald Duncan
- Edited by: David Coulson
- Music by: Mark Nicholas
- Release date: 1990
- Running time: 90 min
- Country: New Zealand
- Language: English

User Friendly is a 1990 New Zealand film directed by Gregor Nicholas and starring William Brandt and Alison Bruce.

== Synopsis ==
A young couple who steal a mysterious dog-goddess statue try to avoid a collection of would be thieves.

== Cast ==
- William Brandt as Billy
- Alison Bruce as Augusta
- Judith Gibson as Miranda
- David Letch as Wayne
- Lewis Martin as Monty
- Joan Reid as Marjorie
- Biggles as Cyclops

== Reception ==
Helen Martin in New Zealand film, 1912-1996 says "As the McGuffin, the dog-goddess is a good starter for a madcap romp (the film's tagline reads 'A little dog goes a long way'), but after the setup there is nothing for anyone to do but chase or be chased." Variety critic Mike Nicolaidi called it an "All exuberant romp turning the caper genre into Gothic gavotte" and said "too often the drive of the main plot is slowed by scenes that are peripheral, and incipient involvement is marooned on a sandbank of whys and wherefores." Richard Scheib of Moria gave it 2 stars and said "It feels like a high-school pantomime attempt to mount an indie comedy. The bizarre and the giggly intermingle with often embarrassing results."
