= Magik and Rose =

- Directed by: Vanessa Alexander
- Written by: Vanessa Alexander
- Produced by: Larry Parr
- Starring: Alison Bruce; Nicola Murphy
- Cinematography: Fred Renata
- Edited by: Eric De Beus
- Music by: Victoria Kelly
- Release date: March 8, 2000
- Running time: 92 min
- Country: New Zealand
- Language: English
- Budget: $250,000 - $350,000

Magik and Rose is a 2000 New Zealand film written and directed by Vanessa Alexander. It was set and filmed in Hokitika and featured two very different friends, one trying to get pregnant, the other looking for her child that she gave up. It premiered at a special screening in Hokitika on 8 March.

== Cast ==
- Alison Bruce as Magik
- Nicola Murphy as Rose
- Oliver Driver as Jackson
- Simon Ferry as Stuart
- Florence Hartigan as girl

== Reception ==
David Stratton in Variety said "The tale of two contrasting women who want to have babies is given disarmingly sweet treatment by the 28-year-old writer-director, resulting in a colorful, lively pic that's easy to enjoy. There could be fest slots for this, though theatrical bookings outside New Zealand may be hard to find." Dylan Cleaver of Sunday Star Times gave it 3 stars and wrote "Yet the real beauty of this story isn't in the script. It's in the actors. Ferry as Stuart is particularly effective, with Murphy as pharmacist's assistant Rose not far behind." In the New Zealand Herald Ewan McDonald called it "Feelgood Kiwi fun that, unlike so many other attempts in recent years, actually is." Cinema Aotearoa called it "a sweet tale, if a little tonally unpredictable, and Alexander populates her world with no shortage of colourful characters. The titular characters are essentially two parallel aspects of motherhood - one looking to begin and one looking to reclaim - and as such they play very well off one another. Murphy and Bruce have great chemistry which is essential for the roles, and spending time with them is oddly comforting."

== Awards ==
2000 New Zealand Film and Television Awards

- Film Actress - Alison Bruce - nominated
- Best Feature Film Director - Vanessa Alexander - nominated
- Feature Film Screenplay - Vanessa Alexander - nominated
- Film Score - Victoria Kelly - nominated
