= List of Shortland Street characters introduced in 2016 =

Shortland Street is a New Zealand television soap opera. It was first broadcast on 25 May 1992 and currently airs on television network TVNZ 2. The following is a list of characters that appeared on the show in 2016 by order of first appearance. All characters are introduced by the show's executive producer Maxine Fleming. The 25th season of Shortland Street began airing on 19 January 2016 and concluded on 19 December 2016, and its 25th anniversary was in May 2017.

== Blue Nathan ==
Blue Nathan
- Shortland Street character
- Portrayed by: Tash Keddy
- Duration: 2016–2019
- First appearance: 10 March 2016
- Last appearance: October 2019
- Introduced by: Maxine Fleming
In-universe information
- Occupation: Kitchen hand Waiter and barista Fine Arts Student
- Father: Ben King
- Mother: Kate Nathan
- Half-brothers: Louis King
- Half-sisters: Sophia King
- Aunts: Zoe Carlson

Bluebell "Blue" Nathan, played by Tash Keddy, made his first appearance on 10 March 2016. Keddy is the first transgender actor to play a transgender character on the show. Shortland Street producer Maxine Fleming said there were around 12 actors auditioning for the part. Keddy auditioned with no acting experience and had never seen Shortland Street. Keddy was initially contracted for 12 months. Fleming commented, "We talked to Tash extensively to ensure he was up to the challenge of this and was robust enough to deal with the attention it was going to bring, and also had the right support in his life. We were convinced he was the right person for the role." The show's production company hired Cole Meyers, a consultant from the transgender community, to help out with Blue's introduction. Meyers thought the casting was "a big deal" and hoped the character would receive a positive reaction from viewers. On 1 April 2018, it was reported by Ophelia Buckleton from Stuff.co.nz that Keddy would be leaving his role as Blue after 2 years on the show. Keddy felt that the role had "hugely" changed the transgender community. He also revealed that his backstory is largely autobiographic as Tash is a real-life fine arts student.

Blue lurks around the hospital and later steals food from the cafeteria. Jack Hannah (Reuben Milner) witness this and starts chasing him down. He eventually catches Blue and talks him into giving the food back. He then pulls off Blue's hood and is confused about his gender. Kate Nathan (Laurel Devenie), Blue's mother, sees this and punches Jack and tells him not to touch Blue ever again. Blue starts at Ferndale High and steals an iPad off of another student. Jack then arrives and gets it off Blue and returns it to the owner. Jack then starts talking to Blue and comforts him. Jack mentions to Blue that he is "different" too telling him that he is gay. After struggling to persuade his mum to start transitioning, he gets a job at the I.V. to pay for it himself. Kate later comes around to the idea and supports him. Blue is attracted to Lottie, of whom Harry Warner likes too. Blue and Lottie later share a kiss, much to the disappointment of Harry. Blue moves into the Hannah's after Kate and Mo Hannah (Jarod Rawiri) start a relationship. He then meets Harper Whitley's (Ria Vandervis) niece Ash Whitley (Ruby Lyon) and after conflict between the pair at first, they start a relationship. Blue is very distraught after Ash's death and starts self harming. Blue would finally stop after an accident involving his mother and a ladder. After helping stepbrother and close friend Jack through the death of his boyfriend Dion, Blue departed Ferndale to live with his new girlfriend in a studio apartment after enrolling in university.

On 25 June 2018 he returned during the semester break to celebrate Kate's birthday. However, on the night where he and Mo tried to surprise Kate, Kate was abducted by the serial rapist who raped Claire, and apparently Dawn's lesbian friend last year. In 2019, after Mo died, he finally decided to do the double mastectomy as the next stage to physically transition into a man. Kate even offered to help financially. However, on 14 February, he had second thoughts, and Kylie had to block his body to force Drew to stop the surgery, after Blue was just sedated, thus was in no fit state to retract. While Kylie initially faced backlash over the move, when Blue fully explained that he gained clarity from babysitting Billie, Drew and Harper's intersex child, he no longer feel the surgery to be a necessity.

He returns in October and Sophia King falls for him. While the two are hanging at home, Ben King rushes in and Sophia admits she likes Blue but Ben says that she can't like him like that because he has just found out from Kate that Blue is his son.

== Kate Hannah ==
Kate Nathan
- Shortland Street character
- Portrayed by: Laurel Devenie
- Duration: 2016–19, 2022, 2023, 2026-
- First appearance: 10 March 2016
- Introduced by: Maxine Fleming (2016); Oliver Driver(2022, 2023, 2026)
In-universe information
- Occupation: Nurse
- Father: Nev Carlson
- Stepmother: Leanne Black
- Sisters: Zoe Carlson
- Husband: Mo Hannah (2018)
- Sons: Blue Nathan; Koru Hannah
- Stepsons: Curtis Hannah; Jack Hannah
- Stepdaughters: Pixie Hannah
- Other relatives: Pikitia Hannah (step-granddaughter))

Kate Hannah (previously Nathan) played by Laurel Devenie, made her first appearance on 10 March 2016.

Kate arrives applying for a job as a nurse at Shortland Street Hospital. Nicole Kruse-Miller (Sally Martin) recognised her name. She then sees Kate, and remembers her as her estranged friend that slept with her former boyfriend (who in 2019, it is revealed to be Ben King). She then introduces her transgender son, Blue Nathan (Tash Keddy), when he is caught by Jack Hannah (Reuben Milner) stealing from the cafeteria, as the product of her affair with Nicole's ex. Kate mentions that they are no longer on speaking terms and has had very little in Blues growing up. She later befriends Nicole and after having been kicked out of her flat with Blue, they move into The Deco House with Nicole and her family.

After Rachel McKenna (Angela Bloomfield) leaves, she has a fling with Chris Warner (Michael Galvin) but after she finds out Mo Hannah has feelings for her, they both decide to stop seeing each other. Kate then starts a relationship with Mo and she moves in with Blue. Kate finds it difficult to accept that Blue wants to start transitioning to male, believing that he may want to change his decision down the track. She later accepts his decision. Mo's wife Margaret Hannah returns to Ferndale much to Mo's dislike. Kate then reminds Mo that Margaret is the biological mother to his children. As Mo and Margaret are about to sign their divorce papers, they have sex. Kate finds out and leaves Mo. She then moves in with Chris and they start a relationship, only to later break up with him and marry Mo. Her overprotective and overbearing ways with Blue also left him leaving in 2018 as he lives with his new girlfriend, a fellow art student in a studio apartment that Kate deemed unlivable. He also discovered that Zoe Carlson, her younger sister returned to Ferndale.

In May, with Kylie dealing with a miscarriage, and Nicole hit by Finn, and suffered broken femur, Kate and Vinnie are next in line to take over as Director of Nursing. But Nicole was well enough to resume her duties.

On 25 June 2018 Blue returned to celebrate her birthday, but Kate was abducted by the serial rapist just as she finished work and was in the carpark trying to buy extra supplies for home. Kate fought him off, so she wasn't raped, but she still suffered broken orbital bone, which prompted Blue to move back in to live with the Hannahs. Nicole and her actually felt more insecure and paranoid over the extra security measures put in place by Te Rongopai.

In 2018 cliffhanger, she was also involved in the plane crashed, which eventually killed Mo, after Mo died, she had been in an on-and-off relationship with Chris Warner while she found out she is pregnant with a child of Mo. This storyline was actually written in lieu of Laurel's real-life pregnancy. After Koru, a baby boy was born in June, 2019, she decided to leave with him to live with Mo's extended family. Kate returned with her baby to support her son Blue on 11 October 2019.

Kate would return briefly in 2022. Kate would make several appears in 2023, now working at Central Hospital. Kate appears briefly in January working alongside stepson Jack whilst he temporarily worked at Central’s emergency department. Kate next appears in December, having been brought in as a patient following an assault. Kate reveals she now a Nurse practitioner at Central and collaborates with Shortland Street CEO Esther Samuels over a joint response to an ongoing drug crisis. Kate is last seen as an attendee at Chris Warner’s New Years Eve boat party.

== Cam McCaskill ==
Cam McCaskill
- Shortland Street character
- Portrayed by: Ryan Carter
- Duration: 2016–2017
- First appearance: 1 July 2016
- Last appearance: 10 March 2017
- Introduced by: Maxine Fleming
In-universe information
- Occupation: Chef
- Mother: Minerva McCaskill
- Brothers: Drew McCaskill

Cam McCaskill, played by Ryan Carter, made his first appearance on 1 July 2016.

Cam arrives at the I.V. bar and is recognised to Bella Durville (Amelia Reid-Meredith) as a famous food critic, however, this is not the case. Unknown to Bella, she strives to impress him and he doesn't correct her regarding his notability. After his meal, he confesses that he is not a famous food critic but he is however a qualified chef and brother of Drew McCaskill (Ben Barrington). He is later employed as the head chef of the I.V. bar and after Bella puts the bar on the market, he attempts to persuade Drew to buy it. Drew declines his offer thinking he is still an immature kid. He approaches Vinnie Kruse-Miller (Pua Magasiva) and Nicole Kruse-Miller (Sally Martin) to invest instead, but Drew warns them off. Later, still determined to buy the bar, he ends up coming to an agreement with Nicole, Vinnie, and Drew and buys the bar. After some celebrations, Vinnie tells him that he wants to vamp up the party and Cam misunderstands this with wanting to take drugs and offers cocaine. Vinnie corrects him and tells him he doesn't want drugs on the premises. Nicole and Vinnie agree to keep Cam as chef but keep a close eye on him. He revamps the bar menu, but the costs of his ingredients prove to be too high and the bar suffers. Nicole and Vinnie notice they are making little return from their investment and bring the issue up with Drew. Drew insists to tell him that he needs to cut the costs. He does, but Cam refuses causing an argument between the pair. Stresses get to Cam and he turns back to drugs. His ex-girlfriend arrives and she reveals that she had left her husband and that they can finally be together. However, this is not the case and she is in Auckland with her husband in hope to use his brother, Drew, to carry out illegal cosmetic surgery on her husband as he was in trouble. After Cam is lured onto a boat with her husband, he calls Drew and tells him to come. Kylie Brown (Kerry-Lee Dewing), Cam's girlfriend, also comes along with Drew. After they arrive, they soon find out that it was a trap and are forced to carry out the surgery. Cam later starts a relationship with Jack Hannah (Reuben Milner), having never had a homosexual relationship in the past. After he is discovered with drugs, Jack takes them to his house and hides them. Jacks brother, Curtis (Jayden Daniels), takes the blame in order to keep Jack out of prison. Later, Curtis ends up being charged and is taken to prison with Mo (Jarod Rawiri) blaming Cam for it. Cam later tells Jack that their relationship cannot continue, much to Jack's dismay. He later leaves Ferndale, and was later mentioned that he has a new girlfriend.

== Glenn Rickman ==
Glenn Rickman
- Shortland Street character
- Portrayed by: Will Wallace
- First appearance: 1 August 2016
- Last appearance: 19 December 2016
- Introduced by: Maxine Fleming
In-universe information
- Occupation: Businessman
- Daughters: Lucy Rickman-Karim
- Granddaughters: Lulu Karim

Glenn Rickman, played by Will Wallace, made his first appearance on 1 August 2016. When his daughter Lucy Rickman (Grace Palmer) arrived in Ferndale in 2014, she stalked Rachel McKenna (Angela Bloomfield). It is revealed that Rachel and her father Glenn had an affair ten years prior with Rachel at a conference in Nelson ultimately destroying his marriage to her mother. Glenn also suffered with an alcohol addiction.

Glenn arrives at Rachel's house party unannounced. He recognises her and introduces himself, but she doesn't remember him. Lucy then introduces Glenn as her father, much to Rachel's shock. Glenn starts to reconnect with Lucy claiming to wanting to make a mends. He meets with Rachel and tells her that he will make a donation to the hospital. He then holds a lunch at his apartment and invites Lucy, her boyfriend Ali Karim (Tane Williams-Accra) and Rachel along with her husband Chris Warner (Michael Galvin), Chris shows a strong dislike of Glenn. They all take a photo together as everyone is about to leave his apartment and when everyone has left he looks at the photo and zooms in on Rachel and himself. While Chris is away, he attempts to manipulate Rachel and get her to drink, but it is unsuccessful. He leaves but later comes back and drugs her. She gets him to leave but later falls into the pool, nearly drowning. He is later taken to hospital and after some tests are carried out he is told that he has a liver disease but he already knew. He asks Lucy to donate liver and his intentions of wanting to reconnect with Lucy are revealed as just wanting her liver. After consideration, Lucy says no and he goes overseas to get the procedure done illegally. Glenn returns and is seen in a hotel by Ali. Ali asks Glenn to see Lucy but he refuses. He eventually sees Lucy and tells her that he is in trouble with a dodgy gang that he had property development dealings with and that he had left the gang and they wanted him dead. He agrees to hand report the gang to the police, handing his evidence of their misconduct over to Detective Brent Cochrane (Kevin Keys). To get away from the gang, he takes Lucy and Ali to their family bach and announces he once sold the property in a desperate time for money but had recently bought it back in a trust for Lucy and Ali's expected daughter. They receive a phone call from a police officer telling them to stay where they are. Spooked, they decide to leave back to Ferndale but they are run off the road by Detective Cochrane who is revealed to be a corrupt detective working for the gang and he later sets the car alight. Lucy and Ali escape the car but they are unable to save Glenn and he dies.

== Rajiv Prasad ==
Rajiv Prasad
- Shortland Street character
- Portrayed by: Mel Odedra
- Duration: 2016, 2018, 2022
- First appearance: 4 October 2016
- Last appearance: 4 November 2022
- Introduced by: Maxine Fleming
In-universe information
- Occupation: Doctor; DHB consultant Accountant
- Wife: Misha Prasad

Rajiv Prasad, played by Mel Odedra, made his first appearance on 4 October 2016.

Rajiv arrived to Shortland Street as the new DHB representative sent to remove hospital CEO Rachel McKenna (Angela Bloomfield) due to some misguided decision making after relapsing to her alcoholism. A former Accountant, Raj became interim CEO and drastically cut costs to the emergency department, despite revealing he was also formerly a doctor. Noticing his emotional nature around young girls, Nicole Kruse-Miller (Sally Martin) learned his daughter had gone missing 5 years prior in Christchurch and had never been located. This revelation lead to Raj befriending Bella Durville (Amelia Reid-Meredith) and a romance soon looked promising. However Raj's emotive nature lead to Chris Warner (Michael Galvin) replacing him as CEO and he committed to departing to try reconcile with his grieving wife. Raj returned 2 years later to stand down Chris, Te Rongopai Rameka (Kim Garrett) and Boyd Rolleston (Sam Bunkall) over an ethical breach. Resuming duties in ED, Raj became convinced his missing daughter had been admitted as a patient and began to suspect she had been kidnapped. The similarities proved to be a coincidence and he departed Ferndale knowing his grief was still overpowering.

Raj returned in May 2022 and removed Chris as CEO after a sexual harassment complaint. His wife Misha (Pamela Sidhu) was admitted to hospital after suffering a dog attack and it soon became apparent she was suffering crippling anxiety following the disappearance of their daughter. Struggling from years of caring for his wife, Raj started a passionate affair with Misha's doctor Jack (Reuben Milner). Misha soon started to recover after trialling an experimental drug and Raj broke Jack's heart, opting to move out of Ferndale with his wife.

== Leroy Raumati ==
Leroy Raumati
- Shortland Street character
- Portrayed by: Lionel Wellington
- Duration: 2016–2018
- First appearance: 14 October 2016
- Last appearance: 9 March 2018
- Introduced by: Maxine Fleming
In-universe information
- Occupation: Student
- Uncles: Mo Hannah
- Aunts: Margaret Hannah
- First cousins: Curtis Hannah; Jack Hannah; Pixie Hannah

Leroy Raumati, played by Lionel Wellington, made his first appearance on 14 October 2016.

Whist his uncle Mo Hannah (Jarod Rawiri) was out walking with Chris Warner (Michael Galvin) and Kate Nathan (Laurel Devenie) in a park to help assist troubled people on the street, he recognises Leroy and tells everyone that he is his nephew. Shocked Mo rings Leroy's mother only to find out that he had run away after domestic abuse from her boyfriend. She wants Leroy to return home, but Mo makes arrangements with his mother allowing Leroy to stay longer. Leroy is reluctant to go to school or get a job, but Mo insists. Mo organises an enrolment for Leroy and Ferndale High. Whilst sitting an enrolment test, he locks Blue Nathan (Tash Keddy) in a cupboard, making Blue miss out on his exam. Kate Nathan (Laurel Devenie), Blues mother, insists on Mo punishing Leroy for his actions. Leroy later goes busking, performing a rap song. He meets Lilly Flores (Zoe Fong) when she sets up her guitar and starts busking next to him, much to his anger. He earns no money and ends up stealing from her, but she gets the money back. He later starts school again. He is attracted to transgender boy, Blue, still believing he is a girl. When Leroy is noticed to have troubled hearing, he goes to hospital, reluctant. It is found out that he has an ear infection and they operate on it. After surgery, he tries to kiss Blue, much to Blues dislike. Leroy starts dating Lilly, but ended when she overheard that he tried to cover up cheating on someone else. He and Blue later became half-brothers after Mo and Kate were in and out of relationships. He clashed with Blue again after he offered to help Olive, the bully who killed Blue's girlfriend Ashley at her 21st birthday party. He also helped Olive sort her problems with her abusive father. They are currently on the run as Leroy killed Olive's father by self-defense.

== Ruby Flores ==
Ruby Flores
- Shortland Street character
- Portrayed by: J.J. Fong
- Duration: 2016–2017
- First appearance: 8 November 2016
- Last appearance: 2017
- Introduced by: Maxine Fleming
In-universe information
- Occupation: Nurse
- Sisters: Lilly Flores

Ruby Flores, played by J.J. Fong, made her first screen appearance on 8 November 2016.

Ruby arrives in Ferndale. After being interviewed by Finn Connelly (Lukas Whiting) for a job as a nurse at the Plastic Surgery Clinic, she gets the job based on her looks. She then meets Nicole Kruse-Miller (Sally Martin) in the cafeteria. After Finn asks her out, she reveals that she is a lesbian and is not interested. She starts helping out Nicole, coming around to her house unannounced regularly. She then brings around a meal when Nicole's mother, Leanne Black (Jennifer Ludlam) returns and Leanne thanks her. She uses Nicole's relationship issues with her husband Vinnie Kruse-Miller (Pua Magasiva) to her advantage and stands up for Nicole during an argument between the pair. She starts to support Nicole.

Later, at a hospital function, she sings to Nicole. The pair kiss and then have sex. Guilty Nicole tells Leanne about the affair and Leanne calls Ruby a home wrecker and tells her to resign from her job, but she refuses. Nicole then goes away to a holiday home with her kids, but Vinnie turns up and takes the kids away. Ruby arrives at the home and her and Nicole have sex again. Nicole tells her afterwards that it was a mistake and she does not want to see her again. Ruby later leaves Ferndale.

== Others ==
Date(s)	Character	Actor(s)	Circumstances
2016– 16 July 2018	Chops	Chewy Fleming	Chops is a brown poodle and Diane's dog. Chops constantly comes around to Drew McCaskill and Harper Whitley's house. Drew, having a dislike to dogs, gets flea bites from him. When the couple try to return Chops, they find Diane collapsed in the garden and realise Chops came to them for help. Drew puts Chops in a dog pound, and later learns that Chops was euthanised. However, Leanne Black discovers there was a mix up and a German Shepherd, also called Chops, was euthanised instead. Chops goes to live with a family friend of Diane.
2016– January 2018	Lily Flores	Zoe Fong	Lily is at a food stall competition and is recognised by Jack Hannah (Reuben Milner). Lily later reveals that she has feelings for him, but Jack tells her he is gay. Lily fakes an allergic reaction in order to win the competition herself and later sets up her guitar to start busking right next to Leroy Raumati (Lionel Wellington) whilst Leroy is performing a rap song, much to his annoyance. Later, Lily feels like she needs to lose her virginity and asks Harry Warner (Reid Walker) to have sex with her, much to Harry's surprise. Although nervous, Harry accepts. Lily then asks Harry to send a dick pic, to which Harry would comply. However, Harry's father Chris Warner (Michael Galvin) sees the message on Harry's tablet which was synced to his phone, much to Chris's disgust. As Harry and Lily are walking up to Harry's bedroom to have sex, Chris stops the pair and tells Lily to go home. Lily's sister, Ruby Flores (J.J. Fong) arrives to Ferndale, wherein Lily would notice her sister's attraction to Nicole Kruse-Miller (Sally Martin) and tells her to be careful. Lily then starts a relationship with Leroy which ended badly when Leroy was caught cheating on her after a conversation he had with Mo. Later, Lily developed feelings for Ezra from the Followers cult, and revealed that she is fluent in Filipino when she talked to a new classmate. Lily would disappear from Television after December 2017, but would be mentioned again in August 2018 by Rangimarie Rameka.
11 October – 6 April 2018， 14 January 2019 – 4 March 2019	Hawks Logan	Teone Kahu	Hawks meets Sass Connelly (Lucy Lovegrove) in the Shortland Street Hospital reception when he carries in a fish he had just caught on a fishing trip. It later emerges that he is a doctor and is currently stepping in at the hospitals Emergency Department. Sass seems to be easily annoyed by Hawks, only to later show their true feelings for each other. Hawks suddenly leaves Ferndale, much to the annoyance of Sass and she goes on to date Mason Coutts (Colin Moy). Hawks returns again suddenly, and its not long after that Sass's relationship with Mason becomes emotionally abusive of which Hawks helps her out of. He goes to Syria to serve for war. Sass is later informed that Hawks has died. Later, this is proven to not be the case as Hawks calls Sass via video call and tells her he is alive and has lost a leg. Sass goes to Syria to see Hawks and the pair later call Sass's family. Sass tells them that she is with the man she loves and her and Hawks plan to stay in Syria for a while. It was later mentioned that they managed to move to Italy, so Hawks can receive better treatment. Hawks returns in the first episode of 2019 as he was identified as the fisherman that save Sally, a pet dog. His heroics prompted a photo shoot to salvage positive publicity, with the cost of his prosthetic leg replacement to be sponsored by the hospital. However, he did not return with Sass. Te Rongopai, being impressed with Hawks after he jumped in to save a patient that collapsed in the waiting room, convinced her to get TK to ask for his old job as an ED doctor, which Hawks accepted. He mentioned that his relationship with Sass has soured, but it was partly due to him suffering from excruciating phantom limb pain. Boyd, however, managed to introduce a non-surgical mirror box technique as part of Hawks' physiotherapy. He was then suggested for deep brain tissue stimulation. Despite the third electrode briefly stopping his ability to speak due to its proximity to Broca's Area, he is responding well to treatments.
