= List of Shortland Street characters introduced in 2018 =

Shortland Street is a television soap opera from New Zealand, first broadcast on 25 May 1992. It currently airs on television network TVNZ 2.

The 26th season of Shortland Street began airing on 15 January 2018. The following is a list of characters that appeared on the show in 2018 by order of first appearance. All characters are introduced by the show's executive producer Maxine Fleming.

== Dion Tai ==
Dion Tai
- Shortland Street character
- Portrayed by: Sonny Tupu
- First appearance: 23 January 2018
- Last appearance: 23 March 2018
- Introduced by: Maxine Fleming
In-universe information
- Occupation: Rugby League player
- Brothers: Riki Tai

Dion Tai, played by Sonny Tupu, made his first appearance on 23 January 2018.

Dion arrives at the hospital as a famous rugby league star for a charity photo shoot. Upon running into the star-struck Jack (Reuben Milner), Dion openly discriminates against him for his sexuality, and flirts with Sass Warner (Lucy Lovegrove). However, upon running into Jack again, it emerges that Dion himself is secretly gay, and attracted to Jack. The two begin a casual relationship, with Dion too afraid to come out due to his high-profile rugby league career. However, when Jack gives him an ultimatum, Dion comes out on national television and the two enter a loving committed relationship. Shortly into the relationship, Dion begins to have health problems and is diagnosed with terminal melanoma. He retires from sport and despite initial hesitation, allows Jack to nurse him; eventually dying in his arms. Alongside his cancer treatment, Dion consumes brownies laced with medicinal marijuana. Weeks after his death, Damo, who was dieting, consumes them, and experiences severe hallucinations.

== Zoe Carlson ==
Zoe Carlson
- Shortland Street character
- Portrayed by: Holly Shervey
- Duration: 2018, 2022
- First appearance: 9 April 2018
- Last appearance: 18 May 2022
- Introduced by: Maxine Fleming
In-universe information
- Occupation: Personal assistant Receptionist
- Father: Nev Carlson
- Sisters: Kate Nathan
- Nephews: Blue Nathan

Zoe Carlson, played by Holly Shervey, made her first screen appearance on 9 April 2018.

She initially stays with Vinnie and Nicole in a rented room in their house, but when she overstays her welcome, the couple try to get rid of her. Zoe leaves bad reviews of the rental, and it turns out that she is the younger sister of Kate Nathan. Dawn sets Zoe up to be Curtis' love interest, but Dawn has no idea that Zoe is Curtis' step-aunt.

Zoe is hired as a PA after Leanne was recovering from a broken wrist and Sass Warner moves to Italy to take care of Hawks. While working, she develops feelings for Chris Warner. Chris attempts to fire Zoe for her poor performance, but she emotionally blackmails Chris by falsely claiming to have cancer. Chris is hesitant to believe her, but Zoe manages to convince him by saying her cancer is Hodgkin's Lymphoma, a far more treatable form. Chris' son Finn, however, warns his father to fire her regardless, but Chris has begun to have feelings for Zoe. After taking care of a terminal patient by reading to her, Zoe's guilt finally overwhelms her after the patient passes away. On the 7th of May, when she tries to show signs of her illness after feeling threatened by Chris hiring an accountant that can double as a PA, Damo forces Zoe to confess the truth of her illness to Kate after Chris covers up for her.

When Chris and Zoe announce their relationship publicly, Zoe finds out she is pregnant while Chris is away in Shanghai as Zhilan, Chris' daughter-in-law, went into labour months early. Zoe and Kate also found out that Nicole Miller has been their half-sister all along when Neville Carlson, their father, finds Leanne and tries to reconcile. However, after Chris Warner returns, Jarryd arrives and demanded money from her, as Zoe had lied about him being abusive towards Leanne. Leanne rescinds her resignation, but Te Rongopai and Nicole see through Leanne's attempt to get her job back, so Zoe is reassigned to work alongside her on the reception desk, while a young man fills the role of PA with MBA, but soon leaves for a better job.

Zoe has an ultrasound, which shows that the baby is smaller than normal, and is later diagnosed to have high risk of Down's Syndrome. Chris suggests Zoe has an abortion, thinking she will never cope, but Zoe is deeply offended. Chris blames himself for possibly passing his genes on due to him being an older father, but later assigns some blame to Zoe. After helping Finn get reinstated as a surgeon, Zoe and Finn develop feelings for each other while realising their relationship is a bad idea. Chris walks in on the pair after the second time they kiss, ending his relationship with Zoe and disowning Finn. After being thrown out of Chris' house, Zoe is attacked by the Beechwood Beast, being raped and brutally assaulted. Being admitted to Shortland Street, Zoe is told she has miscarried her baby.

== Dylan Reinhart ==
Dylan Reinhart
- Shortland Street character
- Portrayed by: Ryan O'Kane
- Duration: 2018–2019
- First appearance: 18 April 2018
- Last appearance: 22 August 2019
- Introduced by: Maxine Fleming
In-universe information
- Occupation: ED Consultant; GP
- Brothers: Daniel Reinhart
- Wife: Stephanie Reinhart; Julia Reynolds

Dylan Reinhart, played by Ryan O'Kane, made his first appearance on 18 April 2018.

Dylan is first introduced finding a weakened Erin Landry after she left Vinnie's House without her son. After a clash with Kylie in the emergency room, Dylan is introduced by the returning Julia as her husband. He was originally working as a GP in Central Hospital, having worked in the lower South Island, and previously attended university in Otago with Boyd Rolleston (Sam Bunkall). He is hired as ED Consultant and GP at the Shortland Street hospital, where his terms of contract are leaked by Zoe to the staff.

At the hospital, Dylan undermines Harper Whitley's (Ria Vandervis) authority over treatment plans, but he is proven to be correct afterward, angering Harper while starting a rivalry with Harper's husband Drew (Ben Barrington). Dylan is chastised by his sister-in-law Kylie Brown (Kerry-Lee Dewing) as well as hospital CEO Chris Warner (Michael Galvin) over paying for a poor patient's medical bills with his own money. After a tennis game at Dylan and Julia's mansion, Kylie miscarries the child she is carrying. Dylan and Julia subsequently agree for Julia to be Kylie and husband Frank Warner's (Luke Patrick) surrogate mother. Dylan later privately confesses his lustful feelings toward Kylie.

Dylan then meets Miranda, the sister of his ex-wife Cassidy, and the two clash. Before Miranda departs, she leaves Julia with an ominous warning about Dylan. Dylan then snaps and tells Julia he hates her and was actually intending on marrying her sister. After this, he sabotages Julia's seatbelt while driving and crashes into a tree. He kills Julia by fiddling with her life support system once she is hospital.

Dylan begins to spend his insurance pay-out while showing a strange lack of grief towards the death of his wife, arousing suspicion from Frank. Dylan then begins to manipulate promiscuous nurse Dawn Robinson (Rebekah Palmer) into sleeping with him and then to dump her boyfriend Ali Karim (Tane Williams-Accra).

Dylan goes on a fishing excursion with Frank at Kylie's behest, having fantasies about murdering Frank the entire time. However, on 31 August, Frank pays ex-gang member Skinny to scare off Dylan, but Skinny goes too far and almost kills Dylan. Dylan threatens to sue Frank over the incident, and Frank attacks him, nearly choking him to death. This turns out to be part of Dylan's plan, as the incident leads to Kylie dumping Frank for Dylan. In December, he becomes engaged to Kylie, but the reappearance of his twin brother, Daniel, digs up the incident that led to their staying separate. Daniel dated Dylan's ex-wife, Stephanie, who Dylan killed via a car accident, in a similar way he killed Julia.

In the lead-up to the 2018 Christmas cliffhanger, Dylan and Kylie embark on their honeymoon where partway through the drive, Kylie receives text messages from Harper, warning her about how Dylan killed his two previous wives. Kylie realises that Dylan will try to kill her for insurance money, and ends up killing him on the final episode of 2018 by asphyxiation.

Dylan made sporadic returns in 2019 as Kylie's evil conscience before and after she married Dan.

== Becky Reid ==
Becky Reid
- Shortland Street character
- Portrayed by: Awhimai Fraser
- First appearance: 24 April 2018
- Last appearance: 28 September 2018
- Introduced by: Maxine Fleming
In-universe information
- Occupation: Nurse
- Husband: Tank Reid (2018–)

Becky Reid, played by Awhimai Fraser, first appeared on 24 April 2018.

Becky first appeared at a hen's night in the IV Bar, engaging in a slanging contest with and then eventually ending up in bed with police officer Curtis Hannah (Jayden Daniels). It is then revealed that Becky is the bride, with her husband being Curtis' police trainer, Tank Reid (Jack Barry). Panicking at first, the smitten Curtis continues pursuing the married Becky, who becomes a nurse at Shortland Street. Upon reflection, Becky realises she was more in love with Curtis than her husband, separating from Tank and entering a relationship with the Curtis.

== Tank Reid ==
Tank Reid
- Shortland Street character
- Portrayed by: Jack Barry
- First appearance: 3 May 2018
- Last appearance: 27 September 2018
- Introduced by: Maxine Fleming
In-universe information
- Occupation: Former Police Officer
- Father: Ian Reid
- Wife: Becky Reid (2018–)

Thomas "Tank" Reid, played by Jack Barry, made his first appearance on 3 May 2018.

Tank is introduced to Curtis Hannah (Jayden Daniels) as his colleague and trainer for the Ferndale Policeforce. Initially hitting it off, the two soon developed a rivalry with Curtis' athleticism winning some friendly training drills. Curtis was later shocked when he discovered the bride he had slept with the night before her wedding Becky (Awhimai Fraser) was Tank's new wife. When Tank realised Curtis was the other-man, he amplified the punishments involved in training and even allowed Curtis to injure himself during a fall. Eventually passing Curtis into the Policeforce, he was devastated when Becky ended their marriage. Scared of Tank due to his anger and volatility, Curtis and Becky isolated themselves from him and noticed he had begun problem-drinking.

Tank's father Ian (Phil Vaughan) was later admitted to the hospital, with Tank sporadically visiting him and running into Becky and Curtis. Still reeling from losing his wife to a former prisoner, Tank provoked Curtis into a fight and was prescribed medication to deal with his anxiety - which he would mix with alcohol. Throughout the year, Curtis had been investigating a serial rapist in the area nicknamed "The Beechwood Beast" and was shocked when Tank was identified within the vicinity of an attack and later seen to be hiding a disguise the rapist had used. Eventually gathering enough DNA to arrest Tank, Becky soon realised the DNA was actually a closer match to Tank's father Ian. Ian was charged with his sex offences, and Tank released from the policeforce for perverting justice. Opting to start life anew, Tank reunited with Becky and the two departed Ferndale.

== Te Rongopai Rameka ==
Te Rongopai Rameka
- Shortland Street character
- Portrayed by: Kim Garrett
- Duration: 2018-2019, 2022
- First appearance: 13 June 2018
- Last appearance: 24 August 2022
- Introduced by: Maxine Fleming
In-universe information
- Occupation: 2IC of Shortland Street; Administrative advisor Gynaecologist-Obstetrician
- Sisters: Whi Tumanaka Roimata Ngatai
- Husband: Pita Rameka (until 2019) TK Samuels (ex lover)
- Daughters: Rangimarie RamekaRangimarie Rameka Tillie Potts (former step daughter)

Te Rongopai Rameka, played by Kim Garrett, first appeared on 13 June 2018.

Te Rongopai is appointed as the acting CEO of Shortland Street in the absence of Chris Warner (Michael Galvin) by the DHB, to the annoyance of Drew McCaskill (Ben Barrington). Te Rongopai begins to reverse decisions she believes have been done as results of white privilege and nepotism, such as terminating the employment of Chris's son Frank Warner (Luke Patrick) while favouring Māori members of staff.

Te Rongopai gives Esther a paid working study programme to further her skills as an emergency surgeon, while giving her time to heal her injuries inflicted upon her by her ex-husband Finn (Lukas Whiting), another of Chris' sons and disgraced former surgeon. She also introduces a free Māori Language tuition program. Te Rongopai's husband, Pita (Jamie MacCaskill) was the Māori Minister of Health, with much of his work happening in Wellington. Their daughter Rangimarie is a part-time activist.

Upon Chris's return, Te Rongopai remains a permanent second-in-charge of Shortland Street Hospital as Chief Operating Officer. Soon after the return of Chris, Te Rongopai finds that her husband is having an affair with his secretary, so she ends the marriage. Taking charge of the hospital again in Chris' absence, Te Rongopai gets into a relationship with Dr Boyd Rolleston (Sam Bunkall), but it does not last long when she briefly gets back with Pita to keep Rangimarie happy. In December, 2018, her feelings with TK return, and she breaks up with Pita for good.

Professionally, due to her manipulating the donor's list to use Kawe's deceased heart to save Esther Samuels, she is stood down from holding high managerial and clinical positions, and can only work as an administrative advisor. However, with Drew's home detention due to tax fraud, Te Rongopai becomes a non-clinical 2IC of Shortland Street.

In 2019, when Chris being injured in a plane accident, Te Rongopai resumes her role as acting CEO, where she meets Hawks Logan for the first time. She tries to link him up with Ester, without knowing that he is already in a relationship with Sass.

On 5 May 2019, after breaking up with TK when he cheats on her to be with Kylie, she is stabbed in the abdomen by Charlie, who was in a meth-induced hallucination and rage. After coronal bypass surgery, she is in a drug-induced coma overnight. Shortly after awaking from her coma, she experiences ventricular tachycardia, which worsens to ventricular fibrillation. About to be pronounced dead, extended CPR by TK saves her life. Despite this, TK decides not to return to dating Te Rongopai, and she becomes determined to investigate the rumour that he killed Hayden to save Kylie.

She returned to the show in 2022, working in the DHB to promote Māori heath, and she keeps pushing TK to work in Wellington with her. However, upon hearing of his prostate cancer diagnosis, Zoe Carlson's lawsuit against Chris Warner, and Warner's racist video against Chris Warner, she manoeuvres TK into the role of CEO, while also having an affair with him.

== Pita Rameka ==
Pita Rameka
- Shortland Street character
- Portrayed by: Jamie MacCaskill
- First appearance: 8 July 2018
- Last appearance: 19 November 2018
- Introduced by: Maxine Fleming
In-universe information
- Occupation: Head of the Ministry of Health
- Wife: Te Rongopai Rameka
- Daughters: Rangimarie Rameka
- Nephews: Kawe Osbourne

Pita Rameka, played by Jamie MacCaskill, made his first appearance on 8 July 2018.

Pita first appears accompanying his wife Te Rongopai (Kim Garrett) to the housewarming party of Drew McCaskill (Ben Barrington) and Harper Whitley (Ria Vandervis). It is revealed by Drew that Pita is the Māori Minister of Health, based out of Wellington. Pita tries to offer TK Samuels (Ben Mitchell) a role in the Ministry, despite him being against the euthanasia legalisation bill, but TK declines.

Pita then helps his nephew, Kawe Osbourne (James Rolleston) to get a job running a coffee cart outside of the hospital. Pita is blasted by orderly Jack Hannah (Reuben Milner) for the unreasonable staffing levels at the hospital which necessitate Jack working multiple 12-hour shifts, and being forced to do things such as inject morphine despite not being qualified. Later, Pita's secretary, Keira, outs the affair she and Pita were having behind Te Rongopai's back.

Pita later moves to Australia to be with Keira. In 2019, he is diagnosed with stage 2 bowel cancer.

== Tim Myers ==
Tim Myers
- Shortland Street character
- Portrayed by: James Wells
- Duration: 2018–19
- First appearance: 9 July 2018
- Last appearance: 19 December 2019
- Introduced by: Maxine Fleming
In-universe information
- Occupation: Paramedic

Tim Myers, played by Jamie Wells, made his first appearance on 9 July 2018. He first appeared from 9 July 2018 to 1 August 2018 and returned on 15 October 2019 as regular character.

He is first introduced as an ambulance recruit who advises Ali Karmin to stay away from Dawn Robinson, explaining that he is a single man who had been hurt by former partners before, which made him extremely cynical and sceptical towards love and romance. He becomes vindictive and hateful towards Dawn, making him suspected of being the wanted serial rapist.

When he returns to the show late in July, he starts stalking Nicole after she rejects his advances multiple times. He breaks into her house on 3 August, the same day that an unknown assailant stole oxycodone from the hospital, then knocked Dawn out cold after she tried to make a failed citizen's arrest. He returns in October 2019, much to the shock of Nicole Miller, and starts a relationship with Shereez Baker.

After a patient comes in and recognises Tim as her ex-boyfriend, Zara tells Tim to stay away from her and he tells her to go back to India. Zara shouts out that Tim is a racist, and Tim reports her to Human Resources. In December, leading up to the cliffhanger, he proposes to Shareez and she accepts. Shareez talks to Sam the psychiatrist about her relationship with Tim, and Shareez tells Tim what they talked about. Tim enters Sam's home and he assaults Sam, leaving him with a brain injury. In the 2019 season finale, he holds Boyd, Zara, and Chris hostage in his office before taking Boyd and Zara in an ambulance and blowing it up. It was revealed in the 2020 opening episode that Tim was killed in the explosion.

== Ian Reid ==
Ian Reid
- Shortland Street character
- Portrayed by: Phil Vaughan
- First appearance: 24 July 2018
- Last appearance: 17 December 2018
- Introduced by: Maxine Fleming
In-universe information
- Occupation: Former Police Officer

Ian Reid played by Phil Vaughan first appeared on 24 July 2018.

Admitted to the hospital for a series of recurring health problems, Ian was revealed as Nurse Becky Reid's (Awhimai Fraser) former father-in-law, father of Policeman Tank (Jack Barry). Ian had been in the Police force but retired due to regrets over his handling of former criminal Curtis Hannah's (Jayden Daniels) attempted arson of Chris Warner's house. Desperate to reconcile Becky with Tank, Ian proved a favourite patient amongst the hospital staff albeit concerned some with his sometimes manipulative manner. The ongoing rapes over many months in Ferndale had resulted in the serial rapist being titled the "Beechwood Beast" due to the Beechwood area of attacks, and when Ian was re-admitted to the hospital with injuries to his face, Curtis and Becky began to suspect Tank was the rapist and had taken his anger out on Ian.

Several staff were targeted by the Beechwood Beast including rapes of Health Care Assistant Clare Sullivan (Becky Button) and Zoe Carlson (Holly Shervey) that resulted in a miscarriage, a sexual assault on Kate Hannah (Laurel Devenie), and attempted attacks on Nicole Miller (Sally Martin) and Dawn Robinson (Rebekah Palmer). The attack on Zoe left enough DNA to identify a suspect, with Curtis confident Tank would be uncovered. However the results indicated it was in fact Ian who was the rapist, leading him to try attack Becky before being arrested. Upon criminal charges being laid, it was revealed he had been a long-term rapist in Ferndale spanning 25 years.

Ian was readmitted some months later after being attacked in prison. Following a powercut in the hospital, nurses were shocked to discover he had been stabbed to death in his ward with several staff members coming under suspicion of his murder. Kylie (Kerry-Lee Dewing) initially was the lead suspect, though it soon was revealed that one of Ian's victims Clare had seized the opportunity and killed him.

== Kawe Osbourne ==
Kawe Osbourne
- Shortland Street character
- Portrayed by: James Rolleston
- First appearance: 25 July 2018
- Last appearance: 25 September 2018
- Introduced by: Maxine Fleming
In-universe information
- Occupation: Owner-Operator/Barista; Barista trainer Methamphetamine dealer
- Uncles: Pita Rameka
- Aunts: Te Rongopai Rameka
- First cousins: Rangimarie Rameka

Kawe Osbourne, played by James Rolleston, first appeared on 25 July 2018.

Kawe first arrives as the owner of a coffee cart that causes Drew McCaskill's (Ben Barrington) cafe to lose business. It is revealed that Kawe is the nephew of Te Rongopai (Kim Garrett) and Pita Rameka (Jamie MacCaskill) and was hired due to his familial connections within the hospital. It is also revealed that Kawe and Esther Samuels (Ngahuia Piripi) previously dated, but split up when Kawe went to jail for causing a car accident.

Upon reaching an agreement with Drew to teach the cafeteria and IV Bar staff how to make superior coffee, Kawe clashes with Esther's abusive husband, Finn Warner (Lukas Whiting). Kawe develops feelings for Esther, and the two kiss before Kawe leaves the hospital to work at a music festival. Kawe returns in September that year, but runs into trouble when one of his three coffee carts is destroyed by a fire. He resorts to selling methamphetamine instead of taking loans from Esther or Te Rongopai. When he tried to quit dealing drugs, he is harassed by Blake's associates.

Discovering that Esther has terminal heart failure, he proposes and marries her on the 23rd of September. The next day however, Trevor and his associates throw Kawe off his hotel balcony, with Esther suffering a cardiac arrest from the shock. Trevor dies the day after on the operating table due to brain damage. Te Rongopai tries to donate Kawe's heart to Esther as his dying wish, which is illegal under Commonwealth laws.

== Lincoln Kimiora ==
Lincoln Kimiora
- Shortland Street character
- Portrayed by: Alex Tarrant
- First appearance: 1 August 2018
- Last appearance: 3 May 2019
- Introduced by: Maxine Fleming
In-universe information
- Occupation: House officer, Surgical Fellow Trainee
- Brothers: Prince Kimiora; Winston Kimiora
- Daughters: Kiri Miller

Lincoln Kimiora, played by Alex Tarrant, made his first appearance on 1 August 2018.

Arriving as a new surgeon at the hospital, Lincoln immediately made an impression on colleague Jack Hannah (Reuben Milner) who was disappointed to learn he had a boyfriend. However upon rebounding with a one night stand, Jack realised he had in fact slept with Lincoln's partner Connor (Jonathan James), breaking them up. Lincoln began flirting with Nurse Nicole (Sally Martin) and a still-smitten Jack discovered he was a high-functioning meth-user, using it as solace after his father had died.

Upsetting Jack by sleeping with Nicole, Lincoln eventually developed mutual feelings for him and they began to date. Supplying Jack drugs, Lincoln soon realised he had turned his boyfriend into an addict and strove to keep them both clean - getting engaged and buying a house together. The couple decide to have a baby and enlist Jack's friend Clare (Becky Button) before eventually coming to a surrogacy arrangement with Nicole after another one-night stand. Helping Jack stay clean whilst they prepared for adulthood, Lincoln was led astray by Jack's former boyfriend Charlie Hinchco (Taylor Griffin) and relapsed on meth, whilst beginning an affair. After spiralling badly on drugs and learning his daughter had died shortly after birth, Lincoln fled Ferndale in disgrace.

== Danielle Fox ==
Danielle Fox
- Shortland Street character
- Portrayed by: Phoebe McKellar
- First appearance: 25 September 2018
- Introduced by: Maxine Fleming
In-universe information
- Occupation: Nanny

Danielle Fox, played by Phoebe McKellar, first appeared on 25 September 2018.

Danielle arrived in Ferndale as a candidate nanny for Drew and Harper's child, Billy.

== Minerva McCaskill ==
Minerva McCaskill
- Shortland Street character
- Portrayed by: Yvette Parsons
- First appearance: 4 October 2018
- Introduced by: Maxine Fleming
In-universe information
- Sons: Drew McCaskill; Cam McCaskill
- Grandchildren: Billy McCaskill

Becky "Minerva" McCaskill, played by Yvette Parsons, made her first appearance on 4 October 2018.

Minerva arrives to track down Harper Whitley, her daughter-in-law, so that she can reconcile with her son Drew after leaving him when he was a child. She is a spiritual person, and her spiritual and cryptic way of talking drives Drew mad. In 2020, she uses her herbal concoction to cure Billy, who has a bad cough. Minerva is later discovered to have stage 4 breast cancer that has gotten worse despite her self-medicating for months. Drew urges her to undergo surgery, and she relents. Minerva has a double mastectomy, on the condition that Drew will perform the double breast reconstruction.

== Daniel Reinhart ==
Daniel Reinhart
- Shortland Street character
- Portrayed by: Ryan O'Kane
- First appearance: 3 December 2018
- Last appearance: 16 August 2019
- Introduced by: Maxine Fleming
In-universe information
- Occupation: GP, Surgeon
- Brothers: Dylan Reinhart
- Wife: Julia Reynolds (deceased); Kylie Brown (2018-2019)

Daniel Reinhart, played by Ryan O'Kane, made his first appearance on 3 December 2018.

Daniel is the twin brother of Dylan Reinhart, who is also played by O'Kane. The actor found playing twins "really fun, especially because I had already put a bit of myself into Dylan and then when Dan came along it was like, 'How do you differentiate? How do you come up with different mannerisms?'." O'Kane was forced to shave off his beard to play Daniel, as the crew were unable to find another person with the right colouring or stubble to fill in for his shoulders and neck.

Daniel is a Shortland Street surgeon filling in for the suspended Boyd Rolleston. He studied in England, and is a very nerdy and a seemingly unassuming and simple-minded guy compared to his twin. However, Dylan is resentful because Daniel had sex with his former wife, Stephanie. Daniel discovers Dylan has remarried and suspects that Dylan killed his wife Julia in the same way he killed Stephanie. Daniel and Harper Whitley believe that Kylie Brown (Kerry-Lee Dewing) is in danger after Dylan signs Kylie up for life insurance. However, when nobody believes him, he takes a job in Arizona after needing to follow up on an old patient.

On 12 July 2019, Daniel is wheeled into the emergency room after a car accident. He suffered a ruptured spleen and three broken ribs. Kylie confuses him with Dylan, who she killed. The accident was an attempted suicide by way of drink-driving and driving while unrestrained, due to feeling guilty for Dylan's deranged behaviour. On 16 July's one-hour episode, Daniel suffers an anaphylactic episode due to taking an antibiotic, preventing him from breathing. After Kylie saves him, Daniel gives up his suicide attempts, but Kylie is highly concerned. Daniel has a short marriage to Kylie, and witnesses her being baptised as a born-again Christian. However, he annuls the marriage when Kylie confides to him that she killed Dylan.

== Others ==
Date(s)	Character	Actor	Circumstances
4 April	Kahu Samuels	Mere Boynton	Kahu and Paora are the mother and father of Esther Samuels. They arrive for Esther's wedding to Finn Warner. Kahu appears disapproving of him because Finn and Esther were in an on-and-off relationship.
4 April	Paora Samuels	John Katipa	Kahu and Paora are the mother and father of Esther Samuels. They arrive for Esther's wedding to Finn Warner. Kahu appears disapproving of him because Finn and Esther were in an on-and-off relationship.
19–25 June, 8 December-present	Clare Sullivan	Becky Button	Clare is a medical school classmate of both Jack Hannah and Cody Burns. She is also a high school friend of Becky Reid. Clare and Jack are in a study group, with Clare harbouring unrequited feelings for Jack. She fights off advances by Cody, and attempts to kiss Jack, who leaves. When Clare leaves the IV bar, she thanks Finn Warner for keeping his composure when trying to get Cody out of the bar. She is later found to have been raped, and took leave from medical school. She returns in December, already moving on, and starts work as an orderly. She offers to become a surrogate mother for Lincoln and Jack. She couldn't naturally conceive with Jack because she mistook Jack to be Ian Reid, so she later tries to inject the sperm of Lincoln and Jack into herself, before setting off with Jack on a field trip. She is implicated in the murder of Ian Reid, but Kylie admits to her that she committed the crime. However, Clare admits that her impregnation attempt for Lincoln and Jack failed. Clare returns in September when Kylie has a trial for the murder of Ian Reid; before Kylie is convicted, Clare admits that she killed Ian and she is taken to jail.
20–22 June	Cody Burns	Sam Luiz	Cody is Jack Hannah and Claire's med school classmate, who possibly raped Claire after unsuccessfully trying to ask Claire for a date. He also tries to provoke Finn Warner, but is escorted out of the bar by Jack. Jack's suspicion that Cody is the assailant and rapist grows, when he tries to text Claire's mother after Claire broke her arm. Jack discovers that he has sent her lewd texts, and abused Claire before. Cody is cleared after his DNA is found not to be a match with the rapist's.
25–26 June, 6 August–	Rangimarie Rameka	Akinehi Munroe	Te Rongopai's daughter. She is suspended in Wellington after she tried to stage a protest against the school for not launching an investigation on a PE teacher who is a sexual predator. After mediation with her father, she is reinstated, and the teacher was stood down. She returns when her parents' marriage ends when her father has an affair with his secretary Kira. She meets TK Samuels and notices that her mother likes him, but her mother denies it.
6–12 July	Diane	Maxine Fleming	Diane is initially mentioned as the neighbour of Leanne Black and the Kruses, and owner of Chops the dog. She gate-crashes Drew McCaskill and Harper Whitley's housewarming party. Her dog then constantly comes to Drew and Harper's house. When Drew and Harper try to return Chops, they find Diane collapsed in her garden from a suspected stroke, and realise that Chops was asking for help.
9–10 July	Kupa "Kupps" Davis	James Tito	A Māori singer-songwriter. His music was first mentioned in Esther's wedding as she danced to his song while having her first dance with Finn. He was admitted to Shortland Street after Boyd discovers a malignant tumour near his larynx. Because of his profession, removing the tumour would save his life, but would lose his ability to talk or sing. As a fan of his, Esther gives him incomplete information, to Boyd and Kupa's annoyance, and he throws away his lyrics book. However, he was convinced by Curtis and Becky, who also are fans of his, that if Beethoven could continue writing music while being deaf, and Esther can still work while dealing with her heart condition, Kupa could keep writing songs. They sing his songs to him, which convince him to decide to have the tumour removed. Esther overhears them singing, and is left heart-broken. Off-screen, James Tito and Jayden Daniels (Curtis Hannah) both belong to the Modern Māori Quartet, with Daniels as an extended member. Tito is the fiancé of Awhimai Fraser (Becky Burrows)
12–14 July	Jarrod Anderson	Louis Maxwell	Jarrod is Zoe Carlson's former husband. Mo Hannah attacks him when he tries to harass Kate Hannah into telling him where Zoe is, as Zoe stole money from him. It emerges that Jarrod was never abusive towards Zoe, as she had led everyone to believe. This leads Zoe's partner Chris Warner to lose trust in her.
16–20 July	Kevin		A young temporary executive assistant to Chris Warner, who replaces Zoe Carlson. He has a business degree, which is why he is chosen ahead of Leanne Black. Kevin quits after receiving better job offers elsewhere. Leanne, after some meddling, gets her old job back, with Zoe supporting her to regain the role.
5 October	Jed Marshall	Joe Dekkers-Reinhana	Joe is the ex-partner of Danielle Fox. He follows her to Ferndale wanting her back against her wishes. He later breaks into Drew's house and later turns up at Drew's mother's house, wanting to know where Danielle is. He is wanted for murder, and is sentenced in November after he was caught.
13–14 November	The Topp Twins	Dames Jools and Lynda Topp	Dawn's aunties in Cambridge, their names also form Dawn's middle name (JooLynda). They were the wedding singers and celebrants for Dawn and Ali's wedding.
29 October–2 November	Xun Warner	Carter Besnard	Xun is a Chinese-New Zealand baby, who was born prematurely in Shanghai, China. Due to Harry Warner's homesickness and postnatal depression, he tries to smuggle the baby back to New Zealand without Xun's maternal side of the family. But knowing that he will lose a custody battle since Xun's mother Zhilan is neither physically, nor mentally unfit, Harry eventually relents, and returns to Shanghai.
