= List of Shortland Street characters introduced in 2015 =

Shortland Street is a New Zealand television soap opera. It was first broadcast on 25 May 1992 and currently airs on television network TVNZ 2. The following is a list of characters that appeared on the show in 2015 by order of first appearance. All characters are introduced by the shows executive producer Simon Bennett. The 24th season of Shortland Street began airing on 19 January 2015 and concluded on 15 December 2015.

== Victoria Anderton ==
Victoria Anderton
- Shortland Street character
- Portrayed by: Laura Thompson
- Duration: 2015–2016
- First appearance: 11 March 2015
- Last appearance: 5 July 2016
- Introduced by: Simon Bennett
In-universe information
- Occupation: Surgeon
- Father: Stuart Anderton

Victoria "Tor" Anderton, played by Laura Thompson, made her first appearance on 11 March 2015. Thompson secured the role shortly after graduating from drama school.

Victoria arrives at Shortland Street Hospital as part of a surgical exchange program. She reconnects with old-colleague Boyd Rolleston (Sam Bunkall). Victoria's father dies, and after initial sparks with Garrett Whitley (Spencer Falls), Victoria develops feelings for married father Mo Hannah (Jarod Rawiri) after treating his daughter Pixie Hannah (Thomasin McKenzie). At the end of the year, Drew McCaskill (Ben Barrington) is shot by an anonymous shooter. It is later revealed that the shooter is Victoria, who is angry at Drew for sleeping with and dumping her earlier in the year. After framing Mo's wife Margaret Hannah (Debbie Newby-Ward) for the attempted murder of Drew on top of her actual fraud, Victoria starts a relationship with Mo, much to the dislike of Mo's son Curtis (Jayden Daniels). When Margaret returns, Victoria tries to kill her by blowing up her caravan while in the midst of faking a pregnancy to keep Mo in a relationship.

After failing to kill Margaret, Victoria gets Curtis sent to prison by drugging his food. When Curtis passes a routine drug test with the help of his brother Jack, Victoria's plans begin to unravel. Ali Karim (Tane Williams-Accra), who at the time was staying with the Hannahs, reveals that Victoria had not gone to work at Central as she claimed to have done while the Hannahs were visiting Margaret. Victoria takes a syringe full of Drew's blood from a discarded blood bag and injects it onto Curtis' hospital scrubs to frame Curtis for the murder, but again fails to get Curtis in trouble. Harper Whitley (Ria Vandervis) becomes suspicious of Victoria after noticing some odd patterns with her behaviour. After being confronted by Harper, Victoria snaps and tells Harper that Drew deserved it having slept with her and discarding her. After admitting her crimes to Mo, Victoria takes off in a car to avoid arrest. Coming across two children, Victoria swerves and crashes into a tree, succumbing to her injuries upon admittance to hospital.

== Jimmy Isaac ==
Jimmy Isaac
- Shortland Street character
- Portrayed by: Joel Tobeck
- Duration: 2015–2016
- First appearance: 24 March 2015
- Last appearance: 3 March 2016
- Introduced by: Simon Bennett
In-universe information
- Occupation: Singer; Songwriter; Bar Manager
- Sons: Kane Jenkins
- Daughters: Dayna Jenkins; Stevie Isaac

Jimmy Isaac, played by Joel Tobeck, made his first appearance on 24 March 2015. Jimmy is Tobeck's second role on the show, having previously portrayed Craig Develter from 1995 to 1996.

Murray Cooper (Matt Chamberlain) contacts Jimmy and is given permission to foster his son Kane Jenkins (KJ Apa). The following year, Jimmy makes contact with Kane and suspiciously transfers him a large sum of money before arriving to Ferndale to claim it. After finishing his career as a musician, Jimmy begins work at The I.V. and begins a romance with Kane's foster sister, Bella Durville (Amelia Reid-Meredith), leaving her pregnant. Kane's sister Dayna Jenkins (Lucy Elliott) is shocked to discover Jimmy was her father too after a paternity test. Jimmy and Bella break up following Jimmy having an affair. Bella gives birth to their daughter, Stevie Isaac (Biance Murray), and Jimmy commits to being the best father he can. He is then offered the opportunity to pick up his music career and declines it to spend time with his daughter. Bella soon convinces Jimmy to take the job and he departs Ferndale.

== Pixie Hannah ==
Pixie Hannah
- Shortland Street character
- Portrayed by: Thomasin McKenzie
- First appearance: 25 March 2015
- Last appearance: 24 August 2015
- Introduced by: Simon Bennett
In-universe information
- Father: Mo Hannah
- Mother: Margaret Hannah
- Brothers: Curtis Hannah; Jack Hannah; Koru Hannah
- Aunts: Kiri Hannah
- Nieces: Pikitea Hannah

Pikitia Rose "Pixie" Hannah, played by Thomasin McKenzie, made her first appearance on 25 March 2015. Thomasin McKenzie is a second-generation Shortland Street actor as the daughter of Miranda Harcourt, who has played many recurring roles including Madeline Trent in 2000 and as Susan Rolleston being the mother of Boyd Rolleston in 2013.

After initially clashing with fellow footballer Harry Warner (Reid Walker), the two become good friends and they begin to date. During football practice, Pixie collapses and it was later revealed she had bone cancer in her right leg, leading to treatment. Her brothers Jack (Reuben Milner) and Curtis (Jayden Daniels) feed her marijuana brownies as pain relief. Following two large surgeries, the tumour was removed and Pixie enters remission. To celebrate her 14th birthday, Pixie goes away on holiday with the Warners but after helping Harry get out of a dangerous river, she develops pneumonia and as a result of her chemotherapy-suppressed immune system, she is hospitalised and suffering breathing problems. Pixie confesses her love to Harry and dies, surrounded by her family.

On the 2018 cliffhanger, her voice was featured when Mo suffered a punctured lung, and is dying after coughing out blood after kissing Kate inadvertently forced haematoma and blood clot out of his lungs.

== Alex Dean ==
Alex Dean
- Shortland Street character
- Portrayed by: Richard Osbourne
- First appearance: 2 April 2015
- Last appearance: 3 August 2015
- Introduced by: Simon Bennett
In-universe information
- Occupation: Physiotherapist
- Sisters: Clementine Dean

Alex Dean, played by Richard Osbourne, made his first appearance on 2 April 2015.

Alex arrives to the hospital as the new physiotherapist, instantly attracting the attention of Lucy Rickman (Grace Palmer). It soon turned out receptionist Clementine Dean (Karima Madut) was his adopted sister. Alex and Lucy began to date but Nicole Miller (Sally Martin) discovered that Alex had just left a same-sex relationship. When Lucy and Clementine discovered this, they encouraged Alex to come out to his family, even though this left Lucy emotionally vulnerable after falling for him. Following an assault on Clementine that left her paralysed, the siblings moved to Christchurch for a paralysis unit.

== Mo Hannah ==
Mo Hannah
- Shortland Street character
- Portrayed by: Jarod Rawiri
- Duration: 2015–2020, 2023
- First appearance: 10 April 2015
- Last appearance: 23 June 2023
- Introduced by: Simon Bennett (2015) Oliver Driver (2023)
In-universe information
- Occupation: Paramedic, Former Hospital orderly
- Father: Rocky Hannah
- Sisters: Kiri Hannah
- Wife: Margaret Hannah (1994–2017); Kate Nathan (2018)
- Sons: Curtis Hannah; Jack Hannah; Koru Hannah
- Daughters: Pixie Hannah
- Nephews: Leroy Raumati
- Other relatives: Pikitia Hannah (granddaughter)

Moutere "Mo" Hannah, played by Jarod Rawiri, made his first appearance on 10 April 2015.

Mo was present at a football match where his daughter Pixie is playing and later collapses. He later got a job at the hospital working as an orderly. His daughter Pixie was later discovered to have cancer. Mo struggled to earn a steady wage and hold his family together whilst Pixie is going through treatment. Mo was devastated after Pixie dies whilst staying with his friend Chris Warner (Michael Galvin and his son Harry Warner (Reid Walker). His wife Margaret is later framed for murder by Victoria Anderton (Laura Thompson) for attempting to kill Drew McCaskill (Ben Barrington). Margaret goes on the run and Mo began a relationship with Victoria, believing that Margaret is guilty. Mo becomes friends with new nurse Kate Nathan (Laurel Devinie) who helps Mo attempt to up skill. Victoria feels her relationship with Mo may be at risk so she fakes a pregnancy to keep him at her side. Mo finds his sons visiting Margaret. After convincing Margaret to turn herself into the police for her fraud, Mo returns to Victoria who fakes losing her baby to complete her con. Mo soon discovers Victoria is guilty of shooting Drew and also manipulating his family. When Victoria tries to escape he attempts to phone the police, Victoria crashes her car into a tree and dies of her injuries in hospital just after telling Mo she loves him. Mo starts a relationship with Kate after a blessing from his sons. Kate soon moves in with Mo along with her son Blue Nathan (Tash Keddy). Margaret returns. She and Mo decide to divorce but as they were about to sign the divorce papers they have sex. The guilt got to him as he confessed to Kate shortly before they were due to marry. Kate moves out with Blue and Margaret leaves to live with her sister. He later reconciles with Kate and the pair marry. He briefly worked in the DHB, as an incoming board member. In the 2018 finale, he, Chris, Kate and Jack are involved in a plane crash. While Jack is left with serious injuries, he hides the severity of his injuries as tensions with Chris rise. He later collapses as help arrives and, next to Chris and Kate, dies from his injuries. Mo suffered a punctured lung, and died after coughing out blood after kissing Kate inadvertently forced haematoma and blood clot out of his lungs.

On the first episode of the 2019 season, he is seen as a corpse in the mortuary. In 2023, Mo, alongside TK's former wives Sarah and Roimata would appear to TK in spirit form, willing him back to life after he'd been shot and taken off of life support.

== Curtis Hannah ==
Curtis Hannah, played by Jayden Daniels, made his first screen appearance on 4 May 2015. Curtis is Daniels' first major television role after graduating from drama school. Daniels described his character as "a bit of a bad boy". Curtis was killed off in the Retribution series over the 2021-2022 Summer which went over his career as an undercover detective.

== Damo Johnson ==
Damo Johnson, played by comedian Grant Lobban, made his first appearance on 11 May 2015. The character appeared in two recurring stints throughout 2015, and from 2016 a permanent recurring stint. Damo was well received online following the airing of his episodes; following his first appearance, Shorty Street Scandal satirically named Damo and Kylie as the "Hookup of the week". Following Damo's later appearance, The Spinoff writer Tara Ward gave him the "Shortland Street power ranking" of number 1 of the week, calling the character "batshit crazy" and suggesting the show was better for it. She concluded her review by suggesting, "Damo for Prime Minister".

== Margaret Hannah ==
Margaret Hannah
- Shortland Street character
- Portrayed by: Debbie Newby-Ward
- Duration: 2015–2017, 2019
- First appearance: 21 July 2015
- Last appearance: 7 August 2019
- Introduced by: Simon Bennett
In-universe information
- Occupation: Nurse; Florist
- Sisters: Elizabeth Forsythe
- Husband: Mo Hannah
- Sons: Jack Hannah; Curtis Hannah
- Daughters: Pixie Hannah
- Granddaughters: Pikitea Hannah

Margaret Hannah first appeared in late July 2015, portrayed by Debbie Newby-Ward. Margaret is Newby-Ward's second role in the show, having previously portrayed Nicola Halley in 1996. Margaret was the wife of Mo Hannah (Jarod Rawiri) and the mother of Curtis (Jayden Daniels), Jack (Reuben Milner) and Pixie (Thomasin McKenzie).

Whilst Mo, Pixie, and Jack lived in Ferndale, Margaret was the primary money earner, living in Australia with Curtis. Mo announced that Margaret planned to return when Pixie was diagnosed with cancer but was arrested for embezzlement, which the family assumed she was covering for Curtis. In July she arrived to Ferndale having been released from jail. She landed a job at the hospital but the stress of Pixie's cancer and subsequent death lead her to start embezzling money from the plastic surgery clinic. Victoria Anderton (Laura Thompson) and Drew McCaskill (Ben Barrington) discovered her fraud and when Drew was found with several gunshots in his back, Margaret was the prime suspect. She fled Ferndale, only increasing the suspicion on her, leaving Mo and Victoria to start a relationship. She returned in May, when Mo, Jack and Curtis are on a camping trip and decided to turn herself in for embezzlement.

By the time Margaret was out on parole a year later, Jack managed to help her move into a rental house as she started a new job as a floral assistant. She had yet to formally divorce from Mo Hannah, who is engaged to Kate Nathan. While Mo resents Jack for helping Margaret, Kate reminded Mo that Margaret is still Jack's biological mother. After she was nearly molested by Jim, her landlord, she moved into Mo's house, but as they were to confirm their divorce, they had goodbye sex which Mo later confessed to Kate, so Margaret left Auckland, while Kate moved out with Blue.

Margaret returns in 2019, having found a new partner and briefly lived in Australia, but she returned to get tests done as she has been complaining of abdominal pain. She was later discovered to have early-stage uterine cancer due to uterine sarcomas.

== Ali Karim ==
Ali Karim
- Shortland Street character
- Portrayed by: Tane Williams-Accra
- Duration: 2015–2019, 2022
- First appearance: 22 September 2015
- Last appearance: 20 July 2022
- Introduced by: Simon Bennett
In-universe information
- Occupation: Ambo Recruit; Paramedic; Pizza Delivery; Piggyback Driver
- Father: Aziz Karim
- Mother: Naila Karim
- Wife: Lucy Rickman (2016-2017); Dawn Robinson (2018-2019)
- Daughters: Lulu Karim

Ali Karim made his first appearance on 22 September 2015 as the new ambulance recruit at the hospital where he meets Lucy Rickman after bringing a patient into ED, after which he would injure his leg and end up in hospital himself later that day. After moving in with Dayna and Lucy, Lucy and Ali would end up in a relationship. In order to pay for a traditional wedding, Ali would take up an extra job as a Piggyback driver with his friend Curtis Hannah. But after Curtis was sent to jail, the business failed as he was forced out of business by rival companies.

Ali's relationship with Lucy would cause many problems with his family, his father disowning him and tension arising between Ali and his mother, who are both traditional Muslims of Tunisian descent. Eventually, however, Ali would gain their blessing and he and Lucy would wed, with Lucy becoming pregnant late in 2016. Ali would sustain a head injury in the 2016 finale and end up in a wheelchair. In his recovery, Ali would exhibit explosive, erratic behaviour due to brain trauma, frightening Lucy. However, with the help of Frank Connelly and new flatmate Esther Samuels, Ali would make a full recovery in 2017. Lucy and Ali would find themselves caught in traffic during the Ferndale Volcano Eruption. Lucy gave birth in the car to their daughter but unfortunately would suffer from a ruptured uterus while giving birth. Rushed to Shortland Street, Lucy would find herself in the care of Dr Finn Connelly. While appearing to stabilize at first, Lucy tragically died only hours after giving birth. Upon learning the news, Ali became withdrawn and angry, and stopped bonding with his daughter, and refused to name her. Six months after her death, he finally confessed that he has feelings for Dawn, but Dawn, who had broken off her relationship with Curtis Hannah and tried a brief same-sex relationship, she decided to stay celibate. However, after her stint as a member of The Followers, she managed to reconcile with Ali and they finally became a couple.

Late in 2018, Ali and Dawn bought the old house with Jack and Lincoln, but by Christmas time, he started suffering dizzy spells from overworking, and on the 2018 cliffhanger, he hid his brain cancer diagnosis (astrocytoma) from Dawn, but it is unclear if it was related to the 2016 head injury.

In the first episode of 2019, he had a second grand mal seizure when Kylie admitted killing Dylan, but blamed Ali for trying to resuscitate him. After the seizure, he lost all recollection of events in the last 2 weeks, including Kylie's admission of guilt hours prior. He hid the diagnosis again, and drove the ambulance to retrieve Damo's engagement ring, where the ambulance hit a woman. As he drove with a known medical condition, he is facing criminal and costs for damages, and is likely to be stood down for his roles. However, his memory has glitched, until the day before his passing, when he remembered the full details of Kylie's murder of Dylan, but he also hinted that he would be meeting Lucy, when he mentioned about Rachel being drunk at their wedding. Kylie attempted to kill Ali by Fentanyl overdose, but failed when Dawn and Lulu returned home. Ali died in his sleep, possibly due to subcranial hemorrhage or organ failure.

In July 2022, Ali appears to Damo in a dream when he falls into a coma.

== Millie Hutchins ==
Millie Hutchins
- Shortland Street character
- Portrayed by: Brittany Clark
- Duration: 2015–2016
- First appearance: 7 October 2015
- Last appearance: 18 January 2016
- Introduced by: Simon Bennett
In-universe information
- Father: Gareth Hutchins

Millie Hutchins made her first appearance on 7 October 2015 portrayed by Brittany Clark. She was a patient of Drew McCaskill who wanted a breast implant. However, it was discovered that she was underage being fifteen-years-old after she had an injection in her breast. She had the surgery but then her father Gareth blames Drew for it. She returned a couple of months later at Drew's apartment wanting a place to stay to get away from her father which Drew accept her to stay for one night. For the 2015 season finale Millie returned to calm her father down after he holds hostages in the cafe. However, in 2016 Gareth was shot dead by the Armed Squad and she was asked to identify the body. She later apologised for what her father had done and leaves.

== George Kirkwood ==
George Kirkwood
- Shortland Street character
- Portrayed by: Arlo Gibson
- Duration: 2015–2016
- First appearance: 20 October 2015
- Last appearance: 3 June 2016
- Introduced by: Simon Bennett
In-universe information
- Occupation: Labourer; Doctor
- Wife: Dayna Jenkins (2015–)
- First cousins: Leo Kirkwood

George Kirkwood first appeared on 20 October 2015, portrayed by Arlo Gibson.

George is as a love interest for Dayna Jenkins. He arrived in Ferndale after going into a hardware store where he met Dayna however it was cut short when she accidentally caused an accident at the store when she knocked someone off a ladder. However, before she can thank him he disappears. A week later, he arrives at The IV and caught up with Dayna again. They start to fall for each other and begin to date. He revealed that he studied medicine in England, and worked in a Clinic of Infectious Diseases in London, but works as a labourer in Auckland on a casual contract. While they were engaged shortly after, George had to return to England for her mother's wedding, but as the flight was first deferred to Christchurch, he had never been heard from, much to Dayna's anguish. When he returned from a one-month stint as a 'Doctor Without Borders' in Nepal, Dayna and George got married on the back of Harper and Boyd's cancelled wedding on the 2015 Cliffhanger. They found out days later about the shooting that led to the cancelled wedding, and Len and later Wendy's passing. Since Dayna revealed that she is broke after her renovations to the IV, he scored a short-term role as a labourer with his old company before Dayna recommended him as a junior doctor (no specialty) for Shortland Street, having saved Jasmine Cooper after she collapsed at the Coopers, suffering from dehydration. As it turns out, she caught yellow fever on top of an insect bite in Columbia on the plane to Auckland, making her jaundiced, and liver function compromised. He has heard of Boyd Rolleston's articles after he performed the surgery on Stevie. Dayna has asked Chris Warner and Rachel McKenna for a role for George in the hospital. He became a junior doctor in the ER department, and mentored by TK Samuels. In March 2016, it was discovered that George had been forging his qualifications as a doctor. Being blackmailed by his cousin Leo, who also revealed George's real name was Rupert, George began to crack under pressure. After being discovered by Dayna, George would panic and continue to practice while being pressured by his wife to quit. Finally doing the right thing, George resigned without giving the actual reason and he and Dayna fled to England. Lucy would discover their ruse but would keep their secret as they left New Zealand for good.

== Gareth Hutchins ==
Gareth Hutchins
- Shortland Street character
- Portrayed by: Jarrod Martin
- Duration: 2015–2016
- First appearance: 21 October 2015
- Last appearance: 18 January 2016
- Introduced by: Simon Bennett
In-universe information
- Daughters: Millie Hutchins

Gareth Hutchins first appeared on 21 October 2015, portrayed by Jarrod Martin.

Gareth arrived in Ferndale after finding out that surgeon Drew McCaskill performed an illegal operation on his underaged daughter Millie. He started to threaten Drew after he performed surgery on his daughter, threatening to go to a higher power if need be. Afterward, Gareth attempted to blackmail CEO Rachel McKenna to sell his dodgy medical equipment. After several doctors reported problems with the equipment, Rachel told Gareth she was terminating the supply contract causing Gareth to destroy her office in a rage, leading to Gareth being escorted off the premises and being issued a trespass notice. Unbeknownst to Rachel, Gareth stole a security access card before being removed. Gareth would attempt to return several other times and was involved in several more incidents with hospital staff before Millie revealed to Drew after being beaten by her father that Gareth had an addiction to Methamphetamine and alcohol and was using again, which was causing his unstable state of mind. In December, Gareth decided to enact his revenge against Drew by sneaking into the hospital, after which he knocked out a security guard. Gareth made his way to Drew's exam room and shot him twice, leaving him for dead. After which, Drew took Kylie Brown hostage. However, Kylie would escape, and in a fit of rage, Gareth stormed into the hospital cafeteria and held Jack Hannah, Mo Hannah, Murray Cooper, Wendy Cooper and Bella Durville and her newborn Stevie and Leanne Miller and Boyd Rolleston and Len Cooper hostage. Len would confront Gareth which led to Len being shot to death. After which, Gareth tried to get Bella to hand over Stevie to use as a bargaining chip. After Bella refused, Mo and Vinnie Kruse used the distraction to attempt to disarm Gareth. Shortland Street finished 2015 with shots fired without revealing who was hit. It was revealed in the first episode of 2016 that Murray Cooper and Wendy Cooper were shot, with Murray receiving minor injuries to his shoulder. Wendy, however, would pass out and eventually die after being taken off life support. Gareth was revealed to have been shot dead by the Armed Offenders Squad.

== Virginia McCaskill ==
Virginia McCaskill
- Shortland Street character
- Portrayed by: Serena Cotton
- Duration: 2015–2016, 2017-2018
- First appearance: 26 October 2015
- Last appearance: 18 January 2018
- Introduced by: Simon Bennett (2015); Maxine Fleming (2017)
In-universe information
- Occupation: Personal Assistant
- Husband: Drew McCaskill (until 2015)

Virginia Laidlaw (also McCaskill) made her first appearance on 26 October 2015, portrayed by Serena Cotton. She is the ex-wife of Drew McCaskill. She arrived in town to see her husband for a divorce and she stole his new car. Later on, they made up and decided to have a clean fresh start. A few days later, Rachel McKenna was looking for a temp PA after Bella Durville is on maternity leave after giving birth so she offered Virginia for the job much to the surprise to Drew. She decided to leave after Bella's daughter, Stevie recovered from her surgery, having confronted by McCaskill to formally sever ties. She threw a flower pot at Drew (and missed) after he tried to send money to her for her break. After counselling, she is in amicable terms with Drew, and sent him home after he is discharged from hospital, but is no longer working for Shortland Street later to become a PA for Fentich, a medical research company. Virginia returned to Shortland Street as a member of the DHB. In the weeks leading to the 2017 finale, it is revealed her fiancée has been beating her and she confides in Chris and they share a kiss, Which is later posted online from a hidden camera in his office. She then finds out her fiancée Adam is planning to take Chris down. In the finale for 2017 she is knocked out and bleeding at the bottom of Chris staircase, leaving her fate ambiguous leading going into 2018. It was later revealed that Adam pushed her down the stairs as he was sent to prison. Virginia departed Ferndale in the hope for a fresh start.

== Others ==
Date(s)	Character	Actor(s)	Circumstances
July–October	Edwin Daley	Maxwell Apse	Edwin is Jack Hannah's ex-boyfriend and math tutor.
21 August–23 September	Trent Wagoner	Kevin Tansey	Trent is a convicted sex offender and prisoner who is admitted to Shortland Street after a prison fight, to the torment of Victoria Anderton.
9 September–19 April 2016	Norelle Brown	Luanne Gordon	Norelle is the mother of Nurse Kylie Brown, Norelle arrived at Shortland Street hospital and was waiting at surgical reception where she was encouraged by Margaret Hannah to get plastic surgery it was later revealed she was Kylie's mum. She later has a fling with surgeon Drew McCaskill, however, he decides to end their fling, which devastated her. In 2016, she was diagnosed with breast cancer and needed a mastectomy, but is unable to cope with the surgery because her aunt also died from the same illness in just 6 months. In April 2016 Norelle committed suicide at home after she swallowed a lethal drink because she didn't want to die of cancer.
12 October–2 November	Stevie Isaac	Biance Murray and Ruby Pateman	Stevie is the newborn daughter of Bella Cooper and Jimmy Isaac. She is named after singer and songwriter Stevie Nicks. She suffered from a collapsed trachea, but was saved by Boyd Rolleston after he made a bio-degradable stent for her with his 3D printer, the first operation done in New Zealand. She requires another surgery to deal with her reflux, separate from her tracheal stent. She was later moved to Raglan to live with Jimmy after Bella suffered from stress.
