= Curtis Hannah =

- Shortland Street character
- Portrayed by: Jayden Daniels
- Duration: 2015–2018, 2020–2022
- First appearance: 4 May 2015
- Last appearance: 19 January 2022
- Introduced by: Simon Bennett (2015); Maxine Fleming (2017); Maxine Fleming & Oliver Driver (2020)
- Spin-off appearances: Shortland Street: Retribution (2021)
In-universe information
- Occupation: Policeman／Undercover Detective; Bar manager (until 2018); Former career criminal
- Father: Mo Hannah
- Mother: Margaret Hannah
- Stepmother: Kate Hannah
- Brothers: Jack Hannah
- Sisters: Pixie Hannah
- Daughters: Pikitia Hannah
- Grandfathers: Rocky Hannah
- Aunts: Kiri Hannah
- First cousins: Leroy Raumati

Curtis Maaka Hannah is a fictional character on the New Zealand soap opera Shortland Street. Portrayed by Jayden Daniels since 2015, Curtis has appeared on the show in 2 stints in both regular and recurring appearances.

== Creation and casting ==
In 2015, producers decided to expand the role of guest-character Jack Hannah (Reuben Milner) and introduce a family unit around him. The character of his older brother Curtis was created and recent drama school graduate Jayden Daniels was cast in the role. Upon being cast, Daniels decided to stay as the role for what he thought would be around 2 years. The arrival was said to "ruffle a few feathers" amongst the characters, whilst Daniels enjoyed working alongside screen father Jarod Rawiri (Mo Hannah). After 18 months in the role, Daniels decided his, "dreams are bigger and I want to try other stuff" and quit the show. He decided to pursue a career outside of acting in construction and accepted an apprenticeship. The resulting storyline saw Curtis imprisoned something which Daniels enjoyed despite acknowledging, "it is a bit sad but I like that there is a bit of drama around it." Curtis departed the show on 1 November 2016. Daniels was happy with his stint as Curtis, believing he had, "been so lucky. He's had so many storylines, huge storylines. It's been crazy. I've been able to do so much cool stuff."

Due to the popularity of the character and ambiguity of his exit, producers decided to reintroduce Curtis in 2017. After auditioning in Los Angeles and starring in an Air New Zealand in-flight video, Daniels reprised his role in September 2017. Daniels described returning as "terrifying", "Just because it was something that had been so familiar to me for a year and a half, and then literally having none of this for more than eight months, coming back meant finding my feet again." As a result of no success in his overseas auditions, Daniels committed to staying on as Curtis for "awhile longer". Daniels departed the role the following year.

In 2020, Daniels was again asked to reprise the role due to fan demand for the character. He had expected his previous departure to be permanent but thought, "It’s been great, especially as I know how hard it is to consistently act in this country. It’s been great that I’ve had that – to be able to go back to Curtis." The return saw a reunion with on-screen brother Reuben Milner who also returned to the soap. Daniels highlighted the development undergone throughout the character's time onscreen, "I’ve done him for like three years screen-time wise, so I’m pretty used to how he is and how he reacts to things. He kind of has quite a bit of freedom because he came in as a bad boy and now he’s a cop, so he can kind of play both sides and that’s fun to do." Daniels continued playing Curtis in a recurring manner throughout the following year.

Starring as part of online spinoff Shortland Street: Retribution, Daniels departed the role of Curtis when he was killed off in the show's final episode. He was happy to film his final scenes with on-screen brother Milner and partner Ngahuia Piripi (Esther Samuels), "It was cool to be able to take a character I know so well and have played for so long and be able to try and push him even more ... We were able to give the scenes a bit more time which is always nice and I’m super grateful that I got to cap Curtis’ journey alongside Reubs (Milner) and Nga (Piripi) who have both been such an integral part of him as a character."

== Storylines ==
Following the diagnosis of leukaemia in the youngest sibling of the Hannah family Pixie (Thomasin MacKenzie), the eldest brother Curtis moved to Ferndale from Australia where he had recently served time in prison much to his father Mo's (Jarod Rawiri) anger. Taking a job at 'The I.V.' bar, Curtis struggled with money and took to drug dealing, cage fighting, and general criminal activities. He began dating bar owner Dayna (Lucy Elliott) but left her humiliated when it was revealed he had been having an affair with her flatmate Lucy (Grace Palmer). Following the death of Pixie, Curtis carried out a vindictive vendetta against the doctor he held responsible Chris Warner (Michael Galvin) but when Chris helped him escape jail time, Curtis decided to go straight. He started up a business with his best friend Ali (Tane Williams-Accra) and began dating Esther Samuels (Ngahuia Piripi). Curtis grew annoyed with Mo's girlfriend Victoria (Laura Thompson) and she subsequently framed him for the shooting of Drew McCaskill (Ben Barrington). Esther left Curtis for Finn Connelly (Lukas Whiting) despite his eventual proof of innocence. After many months, Curtis and Esther eventually reconnected but after realising his brother Jack (Reuben Milner) was storing class-A drugs, Curtis took the wrap and received a 5-year prison sentence. Whilst in jail, he broke up with Esther to spare her the pain of dating a convict.

10 months later Curtis returned to Ferndale with the news that as a recent law student, he had managed to be acquitted and have all charges wiped. Despite jealousy at Esther and Finn having reconciled, he made it clear he was still in love with her but began to date Dawn Robinson (Rebekah Palmer) before having a passionate affair with Sass Warner (Lucy Lovegrove). He experienced racial profiling from corrupt cop Clint Allen (Ryan Lampp) and eventually succeeded in getting him released from the police force. Curtis finally admitted he wanted Esther back on the day of her wedding, but was rejected, leading him to re-evaluate his life and join the police force.

From 29 April, he has had 3 one-night stands with Becky, who happens to be the newly-wed wife of the Head of Ferndale Police, and Curtis' trainer-teacher, Tank. Becky split it off though, feeling bad and eventually confessed to Tank. Having Curtis at his mercy in a training exercise, Tank dropped Curtis, choosing not to save him as a lesson and a warning. From this point, Curtis and Tank would begin a feud. She later broke up with Tank, and starts a relationship with him. On 12 June, he completed his 2-year life turnaround when he graduates from police college and became a constable. However, his first case could be bringing down long time rival Finn Warner, who abused Esther Samuels the second time and broke her ribs.

His first case on duty is with the returning Detective Darryl, who is his superior, and they went back to the Hannah's place to question a dumbfounded Jack, who had no idea that his med school classmate, Claire, was drunk-raped outside The I.V. Bar. However, as Kate was later assaulted, his attention turned to his nemesis - Former Sergeant Clint Allen, now as a taxi driver, transported many female patients fresh off new attacks. With him being pressured by his family, he tried to provoke Allen into confessions when he dines in the I.V. Bar, and was later formally laid complaint by Allen, prompting Darryl to possibly stand him down and take him off the case. After Allen died from a brutal attack of unknown reasons, they turned the attention to James White, who had a history of abusing his partner. However, he was only charged with minor burglary charges as he was burgling a shop during one of the attacks. After that, Curtis took leave to clear his head.

He returned in September 2020 after Eddie Adams and Boogie found him in the bush, and mistaken him as The Creep. However, Curtis was actually undercover to undercover the identity of The Creep. His cover was blown when Boogie told Sophia King, who in turn told Esther as they were unaware of Esther and Curtis' history. Early October, Eddie put Curtis' life in further danger when The Creep, who turned out to be Simon Ashton the former surgeon turned chaplain. He removed Curtis' kidney and hurt Eddies' shoulder, before he was knocked unconscious by Boogie when he was kept in the car while waiting for Esther and Eddie.

Curtis was in an induced coma as the wound was infected and has lost substantial amount of blood. He was extubated and regain consciousness.

In 2021, he briefly rekindled his relationship with Esther Samuels, with her finally leaving Eddie Adams, but with his undercover work focusing on sex traffickers, he left after his cover was close to being blown. This was done as in reality: Jayden Daniels left the show to film season 2 of Head High on TV3. Both he and Esther Samuel are the main characters of the franchise's first R-16 spinoff - Shortland Street: Retribution, with Curtis reprising the role of an undercover Iron Dogs gang member.

Curtis was killed during the spinoff and his funeral took place on Shortland Street on the January 19th 2022 episode.

== Character development ==
=== Relationship with Esther Samuels ===
In 2015 Curtis embarked on a relationship with young doctor Esther Samuels (Ngahuia Piripi). Daniels had a strong relationship with Piripi and he thought, "it helps on screen. If we couldn't get on off-screen, I think it would be hard to find that chemistry on screen." Throughout 2016, Curtis actively tried to steal Esther from her boyfriend Finn (Lukas Whiting), eventually succeeding. Daniels thought Curtis and Finn's rivalry played out well, "Because we're such good friends, we can push each other further safely on screen". Despite the on-off nature of Curtis and Esther, Daniels believed, "they'll definitely end up together. They're each other's soul mate." However Curtis' arrest saw the couple separated which "saddened" Daniels as well as Curtis, "It breaks his heart as well because I think she's his soulmate. He's really in love with her and they've just got together and then this happens and it's quite devastating." Whilst Curtis spent time in jail, Esther reunited with Finn with Piripi stating she did, "genuinely believe that Esther loves both Curtis and Finn but, with Curtis, she just loved him more. I feel like with Esther and Finn, I think she's fighting feelings she's had there because she knows her feelings for Curtis are stronger." As Finn and Esther planned to marry in March 2018, Curtis still believed "that he is the better man for her." Piripi believed that Finn was the right choice for Esther, "There's always going to be that love that Curtis and Esther have ... It is that first love. It's that one that stole your heart. You realise as you drift apart, grow apart, you become different people but it's shared experiences, and shared history that really ties those people. I think Finn is something new and Esther sees a future in that rather than holding onto the nostalgia that is Curtis."Esther's later relationship with Eddie Adams was challenged when he discovered she was still contacting Curtis, with Piripi explaining: "Everyone has that one what-if guy or girl and I think Curtis is definitely that for Esther ... She just can't seem to let him go whether he's there or not. She just can't move on. Curtis and Esther eventually reconciled and had a daughter, Pikitea. However Curtis was killed off in the online spinoff Shortland Street: Retribution, with Daniels acknowledging fan's disappointment, "I think people will be sad but nothing can last forever so I do hope that in the end that they will be satisfied with how everything wraps up." Curtis' death continued featuring in storylines on-screen with Esther struggling with the grief.

== Reception ==
The character of Curtis at first proved to be disliked by the public, with Daniels receiving abuse online but shortly into his stint this changed and saw the character become one of the most popular on the show, and landing him the description of "fan favourite". Research conducted by TVNZ determined that Curtis was one of the show's most popular characters across its entire first 29 years on air. Daniels believed this was due to the ability for the audience to relate to Curtis as a result of his bad choices, "I base him on people I know and who I've had relationships with and come into contact with. I just pull from everyone I've known. I don't make up anything." During Curtis' time in prison, Daniels was often approached with jokes from the public about escaping jail. Daniels was nominated for the New Zealand TV award of "TV Personality of the Year" in 2020 for his portrayal of Curtis.
