= Boyd Rolleston =

- Shortland Street character
- Portrayed by: Sam Bunkall
- Duration: 2012–2024, 2026
- First appearance: 13 September 2012
- Last appearance: 8 April 2026
- Introduced by: Steven Zanoski (2012); Oliver Driver (2022–2026)
- Spin-off appearances: Drew’s Christmas Holiday (2018)
In-universe information
- Occupation: Surgeon; Medical researcher Liaison and researcher for Lynch Pharmaceuticals; Independent Medical Researcher
- Father: Alisdair Rolleston
- Mother: Susan Rolleston
- Brothers: Alisdair Rolleston
- Sisters: Mallory Rolleston
- Wife: Brooke Freeman (2013–2015); Zara Chakraborty (2020—2024)
- Sons: Romulus Rolleston; Remus Rolleston
- Daughters: Raya Rolleston
- Nieces: Shereez Baker

Boyd Rolleston is a fictional character on the New Zealand soap opera Shortland Street portrayed by Sam Bunkall. He made his first screen appearance on the episode broadcast on 13 September 2012. Boyd arrives as the hospitals newest surgeon and is portrayed as a no-nonsense doctor, down-to-earth, and unpretentious despite coming from a wealthy and privileged upbringing, making friends regardless of his social-status.

== Creation and casting ==
Bunkall was cast as new doctor Boyd Rolleston in 2012, a no-nonsense surgeon from a wealthy family in the farming industry. His down-to-earth, unpretentious attitude quickly made him peers of all social status' and has a clear track record which has earned him fans in his field. He is "honest and friendly with a wry sense of humour" and quickly makes friends regardless of their social status and he socialises with nurses just like he does with the more higher ranking hospital staff. Boyd made an unannounced departure from the street on the 16 September 2021 after reuniting with his wife Zara Chakraborty. Sam Bunkall served a total of 9 years on the show, being one of the longest characters on the show. Boyd made a return on the 25th May 2022, nine months after his departure in order to commemorate the show's 30th anniversary.

== Storylines ==
Boyd arrives and is hired by Rachel McKenna (Angela Bloomfield) as a new surgeon for the hospital, much to the angst of Chris (Michael Galvin) and the pair clash. Boyd starts to get harassed by Lana Jacobs (Brooke Williams), Kylie Brown (Kerry-Lee Dewing) and Emma Franklin (Amy Usherwood). They believed that he was responsible for sexual assault when they broke into his house and later had him investigated for the sexual assault of Roimata Samuels (Shavaughn Ruakere). It turned out they believed he had killed Kylie's sister but the suspicions ceased when Boyd located Julia (Jessica Joy Wood) alive and well.

Boyd briefly dates Nicole (Sally Martin), but ended up marrying Brooke Freeman (Beth Allen) in an attempt to disown his parentage. The two began to develop feelings for each other and fall in love once Brooke escapes death following a kidney illness. On their one-year anniversary, the two renewed their vows. However, they broke up following Boyd's affair with Ava Erickson (Siobhan Marshall) after mistakenly believing Brooke had cheated on him. Boyd said his farewells to Brooke.

He begins a relationship with Harper Whitley (Ria Vandervis) and the two get engaged following an annulment with Brooke. On their wedding day, a gunman takes the Shortland Street Hospital Cafe hostage, causing Boyd and Harper to abandon their wedding ceremony to help in the situation. Harper, who was trying to hide her feelings towards Drew (who got shot during the event and was in a critical condition) eventually blew her cover, and Boyd notices that she loves him. Boyd told Harper that he already had to fight TK for her once, and didn't want to do it again, therefore, ending their relationship. Harper gave her engagement ring back to Boyd. Boyd starts to become close with Bella Durville (Amelia Reid-Meredith), who was devastated over the loss of her mother Wendy Cooper.

Bella ended the relationship between her and Boyd after repeated arguments about a ghost named 'Melissa' who she believed was haunting their home, leaving him and Ferndale with her daughter, Stevie. Boyd has a one-night stand with Eve Reston (Jess Holly Bates), who is later employed as the hospital's new oncologist and becomes Boyd's new love interest as well as pregnant with his twins. When the twin boys, Romulus and Remus, were born, he discovers that Eve was, in fact, the body snatcher. Boyd commands Eve to confess the crimes, but not until Remus recovers from congenital hypoxia as he was starved of oxygen and nutrients compared to Romulus.

On September 8, Eve returns with Remus and Romulus. With Eve being a wanted fugitive, Romulus is discovered to have Hirschsprung's disease, which means he needed surgery to repair and remove parts of his intestines with no nerves activating intestinal movement. Boyd illegally operates on him but decides to return the twins back to Eve, instead of handing Eve in so he gains custody by default.

Boyd briefly dates Kelly-Anne Johnson before she is revealed to be working with dodgy pharmaceutical company Audgren. He later dates Detective Natalie Mahoney but their relationship is short lived when Natalie uses Boyd for information on Kylie's killings at the hospital.

Boyd's niece, Shereez, comes to stay with him and he becomes her new father figure as the two grow into companions. Boyd helps her get a job at Shortland Street and looks after her.

In May 2019, Boyd develops feelings for the new Indian cardiologist, Zara. They have a cooking lesson where Boyd drops chili down his pants and the two kiss. Zara instead starts dating Chris, even though Boyd still has feelings for her. Then, in December, Bella returns. They begin a small relationship but his feelings for Zara keep escalating. In the cliffhanger, Boyd and Zara are taken hostage by Tim Myers, who is Boyd's niece's boyfriend. Tim's bomb is about to go off but then Boyd frees Zara from the suicide vest, and the ambulance they are in blows up. They escape just in time. Zara is unscathed but Boyd received the worst of injuries. He has surgery performed on him and he survives, but it is revealed he is now hard of hearing and requires a hearing aid at all times.

Reeling from their trauma, Zara sticks close to Boyd, and eventually, she leaves Chris for him. Some issues arise around children and control but their relationship is steady for the most part. Romulus and Remus return to Boyd and the couple struggles with the massive change. Boyd proposes to Zara but she isn't ready, she later resolves her own issues and proposes to him again, which he accepts. The two have an Indian-Kiwi styled wedding which involves the Shortland Street breaking into a flash mob Bollywood dance. They both adopted Zara's grandmother's maiden name: Charkraborty.

In 2021, Zara was reported missing after fighting for justice against sex traffickers, and disappeared since March, 2021 when she was held captive. After being presumed dead for months, on July 23, 2021, one of the informants confirmed that she was officially killed. Two months later, however, she returned home whilst being heavily pregnant. After reuniting with Boyd, they moved down to Otago to inherit a winery and give birth to a daughter - Raya.

Boyd makes a cameo appearance on the 25th May 2022 for the wedding of Damo Johnson and Desi Schmidt.

On October 18, 2023, after Harry Warner pulled out of Surgical Marathon to clear long-standing surgical waiting list, Boyd returned as senior surgeon as cover. He revealed that he is returning alone. His first job, however, was to convince his best friend, Drew to help after Stella Reihana (Tatum Warren-Ngata) lost a patient due to previously undetected aneurism in their femoral artery. Boyd would later make a brief appearance for Chris Warner’s New Year’s Eve boat party.

Boyd would return once again in 2024 as a consultant for Lynch Pharmaceuticals. Digging into inconsistencies with Addie Lynch (Victoria MacColloch)'s management and beginning to unveil the circumstances wherein she murdered her father Eli (Joseph Rye), Boyd would be warned off by Addie and intimidated into dropping the issue. Later, Drew would begin prodding Boyd over what he claimed was helicopter parenting. Boyd, frustrated at Drew's teasing would take his two boys along with Drew's son Marley down to kayak at the local beach. After an unexpectedly rough set of waves, the kayak would overturn with Remus being swept out to sea. Remus's body would wash up not long after. Blaming Drew, Boyd would leave Ferndale in anger.

Boyd and Romulus would come back to see Nazar Arshad (Mo Nasir) with issues about Romulus's health. Romulus would be diagnosed with mitral stenosis and require surgery. Still on bad terms with Drew, Boyd still insisted that Nazar perform the surgery. Romulus would make a full recovery, and after catching Harper and Phil Grayson (Jane Wills) in a passionate embrace in a supply closet, Boyd would mend bridges with Drew and depart again.

== Character development ==
=== Marriage to Brooke Freeman ===
In 2013 he marries Brooke Freeman (Beth Allen) in an attempt to anger his family and succeeds. Upon the sudden marriage, it was also expected to cause uproar as he was still in a relationship with Nicole Miller (Sally Martin). In an interview with Stuff, Allen commented on the marriage saying, "Oh totally, she is a gold-digger, I think she does essentially want love and she wants to be accepted and loved but she also has had enough life experience to know that life is a lot easier and a lot more fun with money, so she's not really compromising on that one." But despite Brooke's money hungry persona, Allen also commented, "I think she's playing the long game, I think she thinks that if she's got a whole bunch of time with him where he won't be able to see anyone else, she'll basically force him to love her." The marriage was based on a 12-month contract, but after the contract was up, the pair celebrated their relationship that started as convenience but now turned love with a re-commitment ceremony. Boyd later cheats on Brooke and she leaves for Washington to further her career in 2014 and the pair annul their marriage a year later.

=== Failed wedding to Harper Whitley ===
After Brooke's departure, he later starts a relationship with Harper Whitley (Ria Vandervis). The NZ Herald reported on the 6 December 2015 that there was a "red wedding" cliffhanger set to air. It was also reported that it turns to a "prescription for trouble" when one of Boyd's rivals, Drew McCaskill (Ben Barrington), arrives and troubles the ceremony. Vandervis commented that "When Drew turns up she starts having doubts." It was later revealed that the wedding turned to disaster when hospital stalker and gunman, Gareth Hutchins (Jarrod Martin), held multiple characters hostage, including Boyd on the 2015 season finale cliffhanger. A picture previously released to The New Zealand Herald showed Harper distraught with her wedding dress also covered in blood. The plot bought mixed views to the audience with some loving the drama and some feeling that cliffhangers from previous years were better. Producer Simon Bennett commented that the season finale was the "biggest cliffhanger" he has worked on in his experience as a producer in 20 years. The pair later go their separate ways after Harper declares her love for Drew following their wedding in 2017. A year later, he became the godfather to Drew and Harper's intersex child, Billy.

== Reception ==
Since his debut, Boyd has been seen as down to earth, but until recently, after befriending his rival, Drew, the pair together have been seen as more of a comedy act with Bunkall commenting on the pairing, "It was that comedy thing of putting people together who'd never normally be together". The character has been proven as popular with a viewer commenting they named their wireless network 'Fentich' after the dodgy drug company that spied on Boyd.

== Off screen roles ==
Off screen, however, Sam Bunkall helped to write the 2019 rape/sexual violation storyline between Ben King (Jamie Irvine) and Ester Samuels (Ngahuia Piripi), as Bunkall worked as a rape prevention educator, while, as a Shortland Street first, keeps a wronged character in the program to document his full journey to redemption, and the victims' journey to recovery. It also documented the fallout between Louis King (Ben's son) and Ben after the latter finally confessed, having been defended by Louis for the past month.
