= Harper Whitley =

- Shortland Street character
- Portrayed by: Ria Vandervis
- Duration: 2013–2024
- First appearance: 1 May 2013
- Last appearance: 23 December 2024
- Introduced by: Simon Bennett
In-universe information
- Occupation: Doctor; 2IC of Shortland Street Hospital
- Father: Steve Whitley
- Mother: Olivia Whitley
- Brothers: Garrett Whitley
- Husband: Drew McCaskill (2017–2024)
- Children: Billie McCaskill; Marley Fraser (adoptive); Skye McCaskill
- Uncles: Benny Cameron
- First cousins: Ashley Whitley

Harper Whitley is a fictional character on the New Zealand soap opera Shortland Street portrayed by Ria Vandervis between May 2013 and December 2024. Introduced as close friend to established character, Sarah Potts (Amanda Billing), Harper was involved in several high-profile storylines over 12-years on-screen alongside many long-running romances; primarily being an on-again, off-again marriage with Drew McCaskill (Ben Barrington). The character was killed during the 2024 Christmas cliffhanger following the resignation of Vandervis from the show.

== Creation and casting ==
To mark Shortland Street's 21st anniversary, 4 new young characters were introduced in an attempt to revamp the show, with the characters of Harper, Dayna Jenkins (Lucy Elliott), Dallas Adams (Cameron Jones) being created alongside the return of Henry Lee (Peter Huang) in a more prominent role. Ria Vandervis was cast as Harper Whitley, a new nemergency department Doctor, in a 6-month recurring contract that was later extended to a regular role. Originally commuting between Dunedin and Auckland for filming, Vandervis struggled with the extension due to personal relationship issues and considered quitting the show.

Upon introduction the character was described as "straight talking", "ambiguous" and "mysterious". She debuted on-screen in May 2013 and was introduced as a friend from medical school to existing character Sarah Potts (Amanda Billing). Her backstory explained her departure from New Zealand following medical school to pursue her career in Australia before ending up in New York under mysterious circumstances. Her initial storylines dealt with ambiguity as to why she had returned to New Zealand and Harper appearing "vague" on the subject. Vandervis commented in an interview with the Otago Daily Times; ''She's an alpha female and uber confident and used to getting what she wants, which causes conflicts, ''She's also hiding a secret and doesn't want that to come up.'' When Vandervis first joined the cast she found it demanding commenting; ''It was terrifying. You get chucked in the deep end. We shoot an episode a day, so you've got 20 minutes to do a scene. You just try try get your words right and hit the mark. You're a little cog in a big machine.''

In 2024 Vandervis committed to "spending time with my family and watching my son grow", and having suffered "burnout", quit the role of Harper. Harper was killed on-screen during the 2024 Christmas cliffhanger. The decision to kill the character led to Vandervis being "so sad ... It really did feel a bit like a grief, but I’ve come to terms with it now."

== Storylines ==
Harper arrived at Shortland Street shortly after returning from a mysterious past in New York, supposedly to visit best friend Sarah (Amanda Billing). However the two were at odds when she took Sarah's job at the hospital and began to date her ex-husband TK Samuels (Benjamin Mitchell). It later turned out Harper had fled a high up criminal family in America that she was set to marry into. When her fiancé arrived, she briefly considered running away with him but decided to stay in New Zealand. Harper soon discovered she was in love with TK despite his reconciliation with Sarah but shocked all when she began to date Nicole (Sally Martin). The relationship was short-lived and Harper was devastated when Sarah died leading her to seek comfort with TK again, entering into a temporary relationship. However, advances from sensitive doctor Boyd Rolleston (Sam Bunkall) lead to a new more measured romance. Strains became apparent in the steadiness of the relationship however and after investing in a motorbike, Harper met rugged new doctor Drew McCaskill (Ben Barrington) and despite being engaged to Boyd, Harper left him after Drew was shot.

Taking on more responsibility at the hospital through management positions, Harper moved in with Drew and they become legal guardians to her distant cousin Ashley (Ruby Lyon) until she died from hitting her head in a teenage brawl. Eventually marrying Drew, the marriage immediately was on the rocks when Harper fell pregnant and had a termination behind Drew's back. When this was discovered, Drew had an affair with his good friend Kylie Warner (Kerry-Lee Dewing). Reconciling some months later, Harper fell pregnant again and opted to keep the baby; giving birth to an inter-sex child, Billy (Arlo Jackson) in mid 2018. Spending some time overseas, the hospital colleagues noticed a change in attitude from Harper when she returned and when she broke up with Drew for kindly donating his liver, she was diagnosed with a brain tumour. However following emergency surgery, this was revealed to be a tropical parasite in her brain. The couple reconciled following Harper's recovery.

Growing close to a young car crash survivor Marley Fraser (James Allan), Harper and Drew fostered the boy and began a long-running clash with his biological mother Talia (Lydia Buckley) who attempted to take him back despite her criminal history and drug addiction. In 2022, Harper fell pregnant again, giving birth to a daughter Skye McWhitley (Isabella Stillwell) and after suffering with Postpartum depression, fled Ferndale and her family. Returning several months later, Harper struggled to learn Drew had slept with her best friend Nicole, though they eventually reconciled when Harper promised to prioritise her children. Supporting Marley's rugby passion, Harper discovered his coach Owen Hillier (David Capstick) was a pedophile, leading to him assaulting her. Aiding Drew in holding Owen hostage, the two were later framed for his murder but proven innocent with the help of Harper's estranged mother Olivia (Alison Bruce). Drew soon became distant whilst blaming himself for the drowning death of Boyd's young son and Harper began an affair with young surgical registrar Phil Grayson (Jane Wills). The affair lasted for several months, with Drew soon uncovering the truth and ending the marriage - ultimately attempting suicide with Harper helping nurse him through recovery. Accepting a job offer in New York City, Harper and Drew reconciled as 2024 ended, however had a motorbike crash whilst out celebrating. Both suffering life-threatening injuries, Harper carried out emergency surgery on Drew off the side of the road before falling unconscious. She died soon after on the surgical table.

Several months later, a paediatric emergency unit was opened in her honour.

== Reception ==
After only been on the show for 18 months, the character of Harper had been proven popular in such a short amount of time. The character especially won the attention of viewers when a storyline aired that saw her fall in love with bisexual character Nicole, with Harper having had no previous lesbian relationships. This was followed with a 'saucy' photoshoot for a women's magazine and attracted attention with plenty of tweets from followers. One fan reportedly named her daughter 'Harper Ria' in honour of Vandervis and her character and the new-to-acting Vandervis stating she gets stopped for autographs and photos.
