= Jack Hannah (Shortland Street) =

- Shortland Street character
- Portrayed by: Reuben Milner
- Duration: 2014–2023
- First appearance: 25 April 2014
- Last appearance: 18 August 2023
- Introduced by: Simon Bennett (2014); Maxine Fleming & Oliver Driver (2020); Oliver Driver (2021)
- Spin-off appearances: Shortland Street: Retribution (2021)
In-universe information
- Occupation: Waiter; Medical student
- Father: Mo Hannah
- Mother: Margaret Hannah
- Brothers: Curtis Hannah
- Sisters: Pixie Hannah
- Half-brothers: Koru Hannah
- Husband: Matiu Thompson (2020–2022)
- Grandfathers: Rocky Hannah
- Aunts: Elizabeth Forsythe; Kiri Hannah
- Nieces: Pikitia Hannah

Jack Theodore Hannah is a fictional character on the New Zealand soap opera Shortland Street. Portrayed by Reuben Milner since 2014 in what was originally a 4-episode stint, the character became a regular character in the following years and had a family unit written around him. After 9 years on and off, Jack would leave in 2023.

== Creation and casting ==
The character of Jack was created as a guest character for the show, scheduled to appear for 4 episodes. Jack was written as the "First XV rugby player for Ferndale High" in what was to be a short storyline. Reuben Milner was a teenage actor that had previously "turned his nose up" at working on Shortland Street and told himself that, "no matter what happens, if I get offered a part on Shorty, I'll turn it down." Despite this, he auditioned for the role of Kane Jenkins, a character created to depict teenage suicide. Milner lost out on the role but his audition was archived and he was recalled in February 2014 to audition for the role of Jack. He explained his change of mind in taking the role as, "I figured out how hard it was to get auditions let alone land parts, so when I was in my final year of high school and they asked me to audition, I was like, 'Yes, Yes, Yes!'" He was cast as Jack and described himself as being, "shell-shocked" onset as he was, " looking around and thinking 'I know these people' and I'd be like 'OK that's them'. I was quite nervous but as soon as I got on set, because I've experienced set life before, I was like 'Oh yeah, this is all right'" Following the end of his stint, Milner's contract was extended over various guest stints before signing a regular contract in November 2014. Milner was pleased with this extension, stating, "When I heard the news, I was like, wow, this is amazing. I loved it. It's another step up for my acting." In 2015 Milner was informed by producers that they intended to make Jack a permanent character and have a family unit introduced around him.

Following the departure of the Hannah family onscreen throughout 2019, Jack remained as the last member before Milner departed the soap in mid 2019 and acknowledged, "It's going to be hard to wake up and say I'm not Jack any more." Jack's final scenes aired on 7 August 2019.

In 2020 fuelled by fan demand, Producers asked Milner to reprise his role for a guest stint to reunite with on-screen brother Jayden Daniels (Curtis Hannah). Milner returned to the show in 2021 in a regular role and described it as, "coming back from a holiday" and giving him the ability to "reignite the passion". Milner departed the show in 2023, making his final appearance in the core cast on 2 May. He returned for a guest appearance in August.

== Storylines ==
Jack was the captain of the Ferndale High rugby squad and quickly became friends with new student Kane Jenkins (KJ Apa) but disliked his friend Toby Reynolds (Robert Evison). Jack supported Kane through his depression, but it soon became clear it was more than friendship when Jack tried to kiss Kane; the two fell out. Jack began to bully Kane, but ultimately they reconciled. Jack came out as gay to his friends and family. The following year, Jack began to date his homework tutor Edwin (Maxwell Apse) and subsequently struggled with his father Mo (Jarod Rawiri)'s uneasiness with the same-sex relationship. The relationship was short-lived; however, the academic help enabled Jack to continue his pursuit of medicine. Jack reconciled with his father following the death of his sister Pixie (Thomasin Mackenzie), who succumbed to cancer. Whilst doing bar work to pay for university, Jack fell in love with chef Cam McCaskill (Ryan Carter) despite his asserted heterosexuality. Storing Cam's drugs, Jack narrowly avoided arrest when his brother Curtis (Jayden Daniels) took the blame for him and got jail time. Feeling guilty, Cam entered into a passionate relationship with Jack that was short-lived and resulted in Cam fleeing Ferndale. Jack's classmate Charlie Hinchco (Taylor Griffin) consoled him and the two began dating. However, Jack soon realised that Charlie was addicted to prescription medication (which he had taken to help him study), eventually succumbing to the urge himself. Mo managed to ease Jack off the drugs. Charlie was sent to a rehabilitation clinic. The drug ordeal also put an end to a promising relationship with a policeman that Jack had pursued. Jack again found love in the form of professional sportsman Dion Tai (Sonny Tupu). Despite initial hesitation to come out, Dion was inspired by Jack and the two enjoyed a brief romance before he succumbed to cancer, lying in Jack's arms.

Later in the year, Jack met and fell in love with new doctor Lincoln Kimiora (Alex Tarrant) but shortly into the relationship realised he was a high-functioning methamphetamine addict. Despite this and increasing jealousy over Lincoln's previous romance with Nicole (Sally Martin), Jack became besotted with Lincoln and started taking drugs to impress him. This saw Jack develop a severe addiction, drop out of medical school, overdose twice, break his arm, and became reliant on Lincoln who was falling in love with Nicole. Trying to help Jack, Lincoln proposed and bought a house for the two to share. Deciding to become fathers whilst Jack recovered from his addiction, Nicole realised she was pregnant from her previous relationship with Lincoln and permitted the two men to adopt the baby when it arrived. Jack faced further struggles after surviving a plane crash but losing his father Mo. Lincoln secretly spiralled heavily into drug addiction and began an affair with Jack's ex Charlie. Nicole's daughter Kiri ended up arriving prematurely and dying, leading to Lincoln fleeing Ferndale having been exposed as a drug addict and a cheat. Returning to medical school, Jack struggled with continued loss when his widowed-stepmother Kate (Laurel Devenie) departed leaving him as the sole Hannah in Ferndale. In mid-2019, Jack met Matiu (Shadon Meredith) but romance seemed to be off the cards when Jack struggled to learn his new boyfriend was HIV positive. Helped by his best friend Dawn (Rebekah Palmer), Jack came to accept Matiu's diagnosis and the two fell in love. In July Jack's mother Margaret returned to Ferndale and was shockingly diagnosed with cancer. Opting to leave medical school to care for her, Jack and Margaret were instead convinced by Matiu to relocate to Waiheke island to heal so that Jack could still attend his university. After an emotional farewell to the hospital, Dawn and reminiscing on baby Kiri with Nicole, Jack and Margaret departed to live with Matiu.

In 2020, Esther (Ngahuia Piripi) was invited to attend Jack's wedding to his husband, Matiu. Later in the year Jack returned to Ferndale to undertake a medical placement at the hospital under the guidance of Esther. The death of Phoenix Warner (Geordie Holibar) reminded Jack of the losses in his family whilst in Ferndale and he opted to cut his placement short. Jack returned the following year having landed a permanent role as a doctor in the Emergency Department, with Matiu to join him in the coming months. However Jack was devastated to learn Matiu had cheated on him with several men and the marriage ended. He briefly dated Zack Parker (Jack William Parker) before falling in love with Rico Hamilton (Sonam Hoani) but refused to break up Rico's long running relationship. He was devastated when Curtis was murdered whilst undercover in gangland Christchurch, and began dating the cop investigating, Hamish (Simon Arblaster). Despite several gang related incidents, Jack strongly defended Hamish only to discover he was corrupt and had contributed to Curtis' death. Devastated, he helped hand Hamish into the police. Struggling with romance for months, Jack fell helplessly in love with closeted senior hospital Manager Raj Prasad (Mel Odedra) only to be dumped within weeks. Jack struggled at the hospital following homophobia from Emmett Whitman (Stephen Lovatt) and Viliami To'a (Theo David), leading to burnout where he falsely accused a gang member of assaulting his daughter. He decided to leave the hospital and travel the world. Jack returned several months later to visit Dawn, having relocated and working in Sydney. Staying for a short period, he convinced her to move with him back to Australia, selling their share in the studio-apartment.

== Character development ==
=== Sexuality ===
Upon signing one of his contract extensions, Milner was informed by co-star Frankie Adams (Ula Levi) that the character of Jack was being written into a storyline that saw him come out gay. Milner was initially apprehensive toward this and thought it was a "nightmare" but decided it was the "best opportunity" he could get for his acting. He later described this decision as "selfish", as he thought accepting the storyline solely, "because I thought it would be good for my portfolio to show my range" when in reality he, "realised how important my role was. It opened my eyes to how much shit gay men must get." Milner believed that his apprehension on accepting the storyline was because, "I had gay friends, but I just didn't want to portray that as myself. I knew everyone was going to be looking at me and I didn't know if I'd be able to handle it." The character of Jack was purposefully written to defy stereotypes of gay people, something which Milner believed was important, "A lot of teens these days are confused, they think that if you're gay you can't do other things like play sports, or be in the First XV team because they think they'll be dissed but that's part of the point ... when you're gay you don't have to seclude yourself. You can do whatever you want." Milner consulted his friend as to how best portray Jack's homosexuality and was inspired by the advice, "'Gay people aren't different. All you have to do is be you. That's it.'" Jack's final storyline saw him come to terms with the revelation that his new partner Matiu Thompson (Shadon Meredith) was HIV positive, and when the two characters married offscreen in 2020, they became the show's first same-sex marriage.

== Reception ==
The character of Jack and his coming-out storyline was said to inspire other homosexual men in similar situations, with Milner being told that, "one of his mates took a lot of inspiration from Jack. His story gave him a lot of courage to open up about his sexuality after hiding it for so long." Jack's departure in 2019 amidst the death of Kiri was said to be one of the show's saddest moments.
