= Vandervis =

Vandervis is a surname. Notable people with the surname include:

- Lee Vandervis (born 1955), New Zealand politician
- Ria Vandervis (born 1984), New Zealand actress
