= Kylie Brown =

- Shortland Street character
- Portrayed by: Kerry-Lee Dewing
- Duration: 2012–2020, 2026–
- First appearance: 24 September 2012
- Introduced by: Steven Zanoski (2012); Oliver Driver (2026)
In-universe information
- Occupation: Acting Director of Nursing; Nurse; Barmaid
- Father: Mitch Brown
- Mother: Norelle Brown
- Sisters: Julia Reynolds
- Husband: Frank Warner; Dylan Reinhart; Daniel Reinhart
- Nephews: Toby Reynolds

Kylie Brown (also Connelly) is a fictional character on the New Zealand soap opera Shortland Street portrayed by Kerry-Lee Dewing. She made her first screen appearance on the episode broadcast on 24 September 2012. The character was introduced alongside Emma Franklin (Amy Usherwood) as friends to existing character Lana Jacobs (Brooke Williams). The character's storylines have focused on euthanasia, having a mastectomy, being infertile due to miscarriages from ectopic pregnancy and her relationship with TK Samuels.

== Creation and casting ==
South-African born New Zealand actress Kerry-Lee Dewing was cast as Kylie Brown, a new nurse. She is portrayed as a "bright and bubbly party girl with a heart of gold". It was reported that like most characters, especially the other nurses, she too enjoys unwinding by having a drink at the I.V. Bar after work. In the character's backstory, Kyle grew up with her parents and older sister in Geraldine, a small rural town in the South Island of New Zealand. She is introduced as a friend to Lana, when he informs her Boyd Rolleston (Sam Bunkall) had arrived in Ferndale, the man they suspected to have murdered her sister. She and Lana plan to get to the bottom of her sister's death.

== Development ==
=== Cancer and euthanasia ===
In 2016, Shortland Street producers, decided to address the controversial subject of euthanasia. Tackling it with a storyline involving Kylie and her mother, Norelle. The storyline was praised by viewers, with Laura Walters from Stuff commenting "The Kiwi soap has tackled almost every story line and plot twist imaginable over more than a decade" After the revelation of Kylie's mother having breast cancer, she made the decision to end her life, with Kylie attempting to talk her mother out it, but fails, and ends up staying with Norelle in an emotional scene. Dewing in an interview with Stuff, commented, "I think it is so personal and you've got to take so many things into consideration. But I think people deserve the right to choose when they go, and how." following up by saying "The story provides all the context you need. There are certain situations and little things that happen to Norelle that Kylie sees, and you just see her falling apart." Dewing commented on the plot saying; "It was only after the dust had settled and her mum had passed and all these sorts of opinions from others in the community and friends started flaring up that she got jolted out of that world and the magnitude of what she had done set in." adding "I don't think she ever – even on the day of the trial – questioned what she did for her mum". Dewing also says that because it felt so 'real' for her and Gordon to play, it made the portrayal of the storyline easier. After assisting in her mother's death, Kylie gets sent to court. Dewing commented on filming the court scenes that because the hour long episode set to air was shot in a real courtroom it added 'authenticity' to how the episode was portrayed.

=== Relationship with Frank Connelly ===
Frank arrives in Ferndale and upon his arrival, he immediately takes an interest in her. The pair later start a relationship. They get to a "passionate start" by sleeping together on the beach in the back of a ute, which followed with a "skinny dip" the next morning, which caused controversy among viewers. After only a few weeks of being in a relationship, the pair marry during a brief holiday and arrive back as husband and wife, shocking friends and family. In an interview with The New Zealand Herald's Spy, Patrick, who plays Frank, commented "I'm definitely prepared for fans to be stunned, especially with Frank being a new character coming into Shorty and Kylie's the it-girl of Shortland Street". Dewing also commented saying "I think a lot of people will question (the relationship's) longevity at this point. However, it's almost so unrealistic, that it's kind of believable that someone so different would come along and sweep her in a totally different direction and that she would just fall for it 100 per cent."

== Storylines ==
Kylie arrives in Ferndale when her best friend, Lana, informed her that the man they believed had killed her sister, Boyd Rolleston, had gained a job at the hospital. Kylie got a job as a nurse and alongside Lana and Emma Franklin (Amy Usherwood), set out to expose Boyd as a murderer. After discovering her sister alive and well, Kylie mistakenly slept with Vinnie Kruse (Pua Magasiva) and briefly had a relationship with teenager, Evan Cooper (Tyler Read). Kylie and Vinnie soon began a serious relationship but she fell for Nate Clark (Josh McKenzie). Kylie's relationship with Nate soon proved toxic for her when he proved to be hugely overbearing and they broke up.

She begins a relationship with TK Samuels (Benjamin Mitchell). Kylie became pregnant with TK's baby, but lost the baby due to ectopic pregnancy and she was devastated. Her mother Norelle Brown (Luanne Gordon) arrives and proves to be irresponsible with money by buying loads of books for her non-blood-related granddaughter, Tillie Potts (Leila Eketone). Norelle finds out that she has breast cancer, the same disease that took the life of Kylie's great-aunt. After her mother's death Kylie was accused by her sister of helping her mother to die. Kylie was found not guilty of assisting suicide which makes the sisters reconcile. She is then worried about her mother's cancer being hereditary and gets tested. She finds out that she is at great risk of getting breast cancer too. She decides to have a mastectomy and cosmetic surgery to replace her breasts. Drew McCaskill (Ben Barrington) operates and botches the procedure. She later goes back and has the procedure re-done. TK was dealing with a spate of deaths in a mystery virus, and with TK not understanding why Kylie never asked for her job back as a nurse, their relationship was on the verge of ending. TK and Kylie eventually brake up, but vowed to remain friends.

They briefly get back together after she helps TK through a mental breakdown caused by TK's involvement with some dodgy criminals. While investigating the spate of deaths, Kylie and TK decide to split again. Kylie starts a relationship with Frank Connelly (Luke Patrick). The pair leave Ferndale for a getaway and shortly return married. Kylie returned to the Plastic Surgery Clinic to work as a nurse, where she later received training to perform Botox injections. It is later revealed that Frank was already married when his wife, Mindy, turns up. Making Frank a bigamist much to Kylie's dismay. Upset, she turns to Drew and they have sex. After Frank's run-ins, they reconciled and remarried, but Frank's marriage was voided as he still wasn't fully divorced from Mindy. After Mindy left with his son, Zane (Liam Walker), in which Frank was not the father, Kylie is trying IVF, while her sister returns to Ferndale with her new husband, who later became an ED Consultant. Kylie was briefly pregnant; however, on May 1, she was confirmed to have miscarried, just after Julie gave her some woollen clothes made by their late mother, Norelle. Although she was offered money to have surgeries to fix her septate uterus, however, she would become infertile. She resumed her role as Director of Nursing by default as Nicole is injured after Finn injured her in a drink-driving accident. Julie offered to become Kylie's surrogate mother, but with Dylan's past indiscretions had been exposed, Julie's marriage could also be in jeopardy. However, Dylan killed both the unborn baby and Julie to pull off his 3rd insurance claim fraud.

Despite this, Kylie helped Dylan overcome losing Julie and the unborn baby, until in December 2018, when they were due to marry, Dylan's twin brother Dan forced Dylan into a confession, which, despite Kylie's disbelief, eventually killed Dylan off after he tried to kill her to pull off his 5th insurance claim fraud. She also killed off Ian Reid, the convicted serial rapist that was hospitalised earlier that day. Nicole Miller is now pregnant and Kylie asks Chris if he can make her Director of Nursing so she can get Nicole axed from the job. Kylie then becomes DON.

Ali, who was diagnosed with brain cancer, witnessed the death of him outside the ward. Before going to theatre to get his tumor removed, he has visions about Kylie killing Dylan. Later in April, before Ali died, Ali finally remembered the whole scene of Kylie killing Dylan and threatens to take her to the police. While Ali is sleeping, Kylie tries to dose Ali with morphine but stops and runs back to Chris' house and attempts to drink 2 shots of Vodka and dose on morphine, but just before she could, Chris stopped her. TK comforted Kylie after Ali's death and they sleep together, which broke Te Rongopai and TK up.

Kylie has sex with Prince Kimiora in March 2019 after kissing Drew in a bar to feel better and having Drew run off, they go skinny dipping and then Prince asks Kylie to tell him her secrets, but Kylie kicks him out of the house. In March, Kylie reconciles with Leighton Gilmore after he is taken into ED with kidney stones. Prince tells Kylie about how Leighton killed his wife. Nurse Dawn Robinson then starts taking care of him, and Leighton then puts $60,000 in Dawn's bank account to pay for her insurance claims after Ali crashed an ambulance in January. Kylie orders Dawn to stay away from him, but she refused. Leighton was ordered a transfer of hospitals, but Kylie killed him by overdosing him on medicine

In June 2019, Laura King dies from a drug overdose, and Esther is targeted by a dangerous man, Ben King saves Esther and they go back to TK's house. Ben and Esther sleep together and Esther keeps saying "no" but Ben unfortunately doesn't stop until he realises he went too far. Kylie thought it was her business to be involved and she and TK threaten Ben with the police. Esther does not want to take Ben in to the police.

Later the next month, Dan (Dylan's twin) is taken into ED, at first Kylie is traumatised as she sees visions of Dylan. Dan tells Kylie to stay away from her, but instead Kylie stays close to him and they start a relationship, Kylie then meets a Christian family and she tells them there is no God. Kylie then gets dehydrated in the Waitākere Ranges and is taken into ED. Kylie then realises there is a God and she asks him for forgiveness of her sins and gets baptised. She marries Daniel and is found not guilty of the death of Ian Reid. Daniel leaves her and she had shock therapy in August.

In the 2019 finale, she and TK deliver Phoenix Warner's baby and the two get back together, much to the returning Frank Warner's upset. In February, they get engaged and Kylie's lost year from shock therapy returns, and she realise she killed Dylan and Leighton. She turns herself in and is sent to prison.

In the 2026 finale, she is revealed to be in prison (alongside Nicole Miller) and has been accepted to transfer back to Shortland Street hospital.
