= Ryan O'Kane =

New Zealand actor

- Born: 1982 or 1983 (age 43–44); Dunedin, New Zealand
- Occupation: Actor
- Spouse: Jazmyne van Gosliga (m. 2018)

Ryan O'Kane (born 1982 or 1983) is a New Zealand actor. His roles include Rhys Levitt in the Australian police drama City Homicide, Prince Frederik in the telemovie Mary: The Making of a Princess, and Riley Hawkins in Home and Away. In 2018 and 2019, O'Kane portrayed Dylan Reinhart and his twin brother Daniel Reinhart in Shortland Street.

== Early life ==
O'Kane was born in Dunedin, New Zealand. In 2000, he began attending the University of Otago, where he studied a Bachelor of Arts, majoring in Psychology. O'Kane intended to study medicine, but upon realising he wanted to become an actor, he attended New Zealand Drama School, studying Performance Art.

== Career ==
O'Kane's first role saw him play a criminal in The Insider's Guide To Love. He won Best Actor in a TV Drama at the 2006 Qantas Television Awards for his performance. He went on to portray a police officer in a production of The Hothouse, before joining the cast of Australian drama City Homicide as Detective Senior Constable Rhys Levitt in 2010. O'Kane relocated to Melbourne for the role. O'Kane played cricketer Bob Blair in Tangiwai: A Love Story and protester Des Oram the telemovie Rage. This was followed up with roles in the mini-series Howzat! Kerry Packer's War and the series Conspiracy 365. There were guest appearances in The Doctor Blake Mysteries and Mr & Mrs Murder in 2013 and It's a Date in 2014. He also had a starring role in the 2014 television series Fat Tony & Co. The following year, he appeared in the telemovie Mary: The Making of a Princess. In 2016, he appeared in the television drama series The Secret Daughter and the television mini-series Brock. O'Kane joined the cast of Home and Away in the guest role of surgeon Riley Hawkins. He made his first appearance on 31 January 2017. Since April 2018, he has played the role of Dr Dylan Reinhart in Shortland Street. Later that year, he began playing Dylan's twin Daniel Reinhart.

O'Kane has appeared in the films Alex & Eve, Save Your Legs!, Down Under and the 2026 documentary film Sgt. Haane.

== Personal life ==
O'Kane met actor and make-up artist Jazmyne van Gosliga on the set of Pirates of the Airwaves in 2013. They married in January 2018.
