= Nicole Miller (Shortland Street) =

Fictional character on the New Zealand soap opera Shortland Street

Nicole Miller-Mullens
- Shortland Street character
- Portrayed by: Sally Martin
- Duration: 2009–2026
- First appearance: 23 September 2009
- Last appearance: 17 November 2026
- Introduced by: Steven Zanoski (2009); Oliver Driver (2025–26)
In-universe information
- Occupation: Director of Nursing; Nurse
- Father: William Miller
- Mother: Leanne Black
- Brothers: Eric Miller
- Half-brothers: Eddie Adams
- Half-sisters: Morgan Braithwaite
- Husband: Vinnie Kruse (2015–2018)
- Wife: Maeve Mullens (2020–2025)
- Sons: Pele Kruse-Miller
- Daughters: Kiri Miller
- Stepsons: Wilder Mullens; Michael Hampton-Rees
- Grandmothers: Grandma Miller

Nicole Miller-Mullens is a fictional character on the New Zealand soap opera Shortland Street who was portrayed by Sally Martin for 15 years from September 2009 to December 2024. Nicole makes further appearances in August 2025 and November 2026.

== Creation and casting ==
Nicole was created as a love interest for established character Maia Jeffries (Anna Jullienne). Sally Martin had previously auditioned for 4 other roles before being offered the role of Nicole and was described as calling the portrayal of the same-sex relationship, "liberating".

Martin was happy to be cast and enjoyed the relationship as, "It's something I haven't experienced in real life so it's fun to get stuck into it." However, in accepting the role, she had to cut her trademark long hair, something that she and her family were uncomfortable with. In 2011 producers permitted Martin to regrow her hair much to her excitement. In 2024 as the show's second longest-running character after 15 years on-screen, Nicole was axed from Shortland Street. She departed during the episode airing 20 December 2024. However she agreed to return in a guest appearance the following year for a prison-based storyline.

== Storylines ==
Nicole arrived at Shortland Street from Tauranga under mysterious circumstances in September 2009 when it became clear she had a strange fascination with colleague Morgan Braithwaite (Bonnie Soper). Suspicions were raised when it transpired she had sought out the hospital specifically to meet Morgan and some staff began to suspect the openly bi-sexual Nicole of being in-love and stalking Morgan. However when Morgan confronted Nicole with the allegation, she was shocked to learn the two were actually, illegitimate half-sisters resulting from an extra-marital affair of Nicole's father. After a long period of flirting, Nicole began to date her boss Maia Jeffries (Anna Jullienne) but they broke up following the revelation Maia had murdered Ethan Pierce (Owen Black) a year prior. Nicole was devastated when Morgan was struck by a car and killed and quickly leapt into a relationship with Maia. However struggling with the loss of her half-sister, she quit Shortland Street unexpectedly and returned to Tauranga. Maia tracked her down retrieved her to Ferndale several months later, resuming their relationship. In 2011 Nicole was disgusted to learn Maia had cheated on her with Jennifer (Sara Wiseman), leaving her and rebounded with Maxwell Avia (Robbie Magasiva). However he too cheated on Nicole, leaving her heartbroken and eventually breaking up permanently some months later.

Nicole fell in love with her friend Lana Jacobs (Brooke Williams) but before the two could consummate their relationship, Maia returned and a confused Nicole got seriously injured in a helicopter crash. Recovering, but needing time for herself she ended things with both Lana and Maia. Securing the role of "Director of Nursing", Nicole briefly dated Boyd Rolleston (Sam Bunkall) before falling in love with her best friend Vinnie (Pua Magasiva). However Vinnie left her and Nicole briefly rebounded with Bonnie Deane (Steph Cusick) before committing herself to a life of being single; carrying out a wedding ceremony to herself. This was short-lived however when she and Vinnie readmitted their love but she opted instead began to date Harper Whitley (Ria Vandervis). Ending things with Harper, Nicole's attraction to Vinnie proved too strong and the two rekindled and she fell pregnant. However in late 2014 shortly after the birth of their son Pele, Nicole suffered a brain bleed and after waking from a coma, suffered major problems with her mental fatigue and postnatal depression. After concern she may be showing signs of schizophrenia, Nicole realised her love for her family and got engaged to Vinnie. The two were married by Nicole's former lover and Vinnie's cousin, Maxwell.

With the support of her mother Leanne (Jennifer Ludlam), Nicole purchased "The I.V. Bar" with Vinnie and sought about establishing a small business portfolio. Financial and marital stress soon emerged and Nicole shocked all when she was discovered to have been having an affair with new nurse Ruby Flores (J.J. Fong). The couple survived but a bitterness remained that ultimately saw the need to sell their businesses to avoid bankruptcy. Deciding whether to relocate overseas for Vinnie's career, Nicole was struck severely by Finn Warner (Lukas Whiting) drunk driving and in her recovery, suffered extreme anxiety, heightened after nearly being attacked by serial rapist The Beechwood Beast. As a result of her anxiety, Nicole opted not to join Vinnie overseas and the marriage was amicably ended. Continuing her managerial work at the hospital, Nicole fell for new Doctor Lincoln Kimiora (Alex Tarrant) and offered to be a surrogate mother for his relationship with Jack Hannah (Reuben Milner). Struggling with her feelings for Lincoln and desire to keep his baby despite his increasing drug addiction, she eventually agreed to give over custody. However their daughter, Kiri died not long after birth and Lincoln fled Ferndale. Shortly after, Nicole was delighted to meet an unknown half-brother Eddie (Rawiri Jobe) who quickly became part of the family.

In mid-2019 Nicole briefly dated her colleague Zara Mandal (Nivi Summer) before developing a crush on Marty Walker (Scott Smart). However her romance with Marty was put on hold when she fell deeply in love with fellow Nurse Maeve Mullens (Jess Sayer). With the romance moving very quickly, the two got married in November 2020. Their honeymoon was cut-short in a dramatic car crash that saw Nicole hospitalised for the remainder of the year. Struggling with the previous few years, she began to see counsellor Carla Summerfield (Elizabeth Easther) who manipulated her into removing Leanne from her life, and attempted this on Maeve too. Eventually realising this, Nicole reconciled with Leanne and helped Carla receive jail time. Still suffering with her mental health, Nicole opted to leave Maeve. The murder of Maeve's son Wilder (Darby McKessar) led to the couple getting closer but not reconciling. Following Maeve's suicide attempt and arrest for murder, Nicole started sleeping with best-friend Harper's husband Drew McCaskill (Ben Barrington). However the proof of Maeve's innocence led to the couple reconciling despite upset over Nicole's affair. Nicole grew close to surgical intern Quinn Cox (Clementine Mills) and was devastated when they were murdered by a rogue shooter, Milo Cross (Ben Poter).

The terminal cancer diagnosis, and subsequent death of Leanne saw Nicole increasingly struggling with her mental health, relationships, and financial problems resulting from caring for Maeve's grandson Knox. She began finding solace in an online support group where she could anonymously voice frustration with Maeve and Knox's mother Cassie (Meg Alexander). However when these messages were vindictively leaked, Nicole realised Knox's former kidnapped Louisa Gunnell (Chelsea McEwan Millar) had faked the chatroom to illicit information from her. Taking Nicole hostage so she could attempt to take Knox, a fight broke out that resulted in Louisa dying from a head injury. Initially claiming this was an accident, Nicole was acquitted of murder at trial only to try framing Cassie. However a flashback reminded Nicole that she had in fact intentionally murdered Louisa and she confessed her crime, getting sentenced to 10 years in prison. Nicole reappears 8 months later when Drew visits her in prison after he finds out Nicole wants to divorce her wife Maeve Mullins (Jess Sayer).

== Reception ==
An episode that saw Nicole refer to Tauranga as not being as gay friendly as Auckland proved highly controversial. Bay of Plenty Tourism general manager, Tim Burgess believed the show was establishing a "negative stereotype," and that the, "only positive thing I can say is they were pronouncing Tauranga and Mauao correctly." In response to the episode he referred to the writing team as "disappointing and lazy." Burgess also requested an apology.

The storyline that saw Nicole marry herself was heavily criticised, and was singled out by script writer Lynette Crawford-Williams as the single biggest regret she had whilst working on the soap for 13 years. Comedian Guy Williams, who despite describing his love for the show, named the plot as, "a bit weird". Melenie Parkes writing for Yahoo! Entertainment labelled the wedding episode as the most "outrageous" aired in 2013. Matthew Denton of the University of Auckland student magazine, Craccum, named Nicole as the shows 6th most annoying character due to the storyline.

Nicole and Maeve's relationship was groundbreaking for Shortland Street, becoming the first on-screen same-sex marriage.
