= Ngahuia Piripi =

New Zealand television actress

Ngahuia Piripi is a New Zealand television actress. Piripi plays Esther Samuels on the New Zealand soap opera Shortland Street.

== Biography ==
Piripi was born in Auckland to Poto Stephens-Dunn and Haami Piripi; she was raised by her mother. She is a member of Te Rarawa tribe. She attended a Kura Kaupapa Māori (a Māori-language immersion primary school) and is fluent in Te Reo Māori.

She attended Auckland Girls' Grammar School and while still studying started working on Māori language television shows such as Whanau. After high school she started studying for a science degree then changed to a bachelor of Māori development at Auckland University of Technology. She continued to work on Maori language television, appearing in two seasons of the soap Korero Mai.

Piripi has also appeared in the movie Mahana, produced by Lee Tamahori.
