= Maxine Fleming =

New Zealand screenwriter and producer

- Born: New Zealand
- Occupation(s): Television screenwriter, producer

Maxine Fleming is a New Zealand television screenwriter and producer. She was recognised at the Women in Film and Television New Zealand Awards in 2018.

== Biography ==
Fleming grew up in Thames, and studied journalism at Auckland University of Technology. After graduating, she worked in newsrooms in New Zealand and Australia, and worked at news agency Australian Associated Press. She also wrote and performed for theatre groups and eventually stopped working in journalism to work in theatre.

In 1992 Fleming got her first scriptwriting position, on the newly launched television soap opera Shortland Street. She has also written for TV series Outrageous Fortune, City Life, Mercy Peak, and The Chosen. She was head writer on the series Interrogation.

In 2000, Fleming and Gavin Strawhan started working together on a teen television series, Being Eve. The show debuted on TV3 in 2001 and won national awards for Best Drama Series, and Best Children's Programme. It was also Emmy nominated in the Children and Young People category, and Fleming was nominated for best script at the NZ Television Awards. The show sold to more than 40 territories and screened in the US on Nickelodeon and its sister channel, The N.

In 2008 Fleming worked with Strawhan again to create the television series Burying Brian. In 2013 her series Agent Anna debuted, for which she won an award for Best TV Comedy Episode at the 2013 New Zealand Script Writer Awards. In 2016 she co-created series 800 Words, which was nominated in three categories of the Logie Awards of 2016.

In 2016, Fleming was appointed producer of Shortland Street.

=== Awards and recognition ===
- Images & Sound Award for Success in Television and Digital at 2018 Women in Film and Television New Zealand Awards
- Best TV Comedy Episode (shared with Vanessa Alexander) at 2013 Scriptwriters Association of New Zealand Awards
