= Ria Vandervis =

New Zealand actress (born 1984)

- Born: 5 July 1984 (age 41); Dunedin, New Zealand
- Occupations: Actress; Marriage celebrant
- Years active: 2004–present
- Spouse: Chris Ashton (m. 2012)
- Father: Lee Vandervis
- Website: riavandervis.com

Ria Vandervis (born 5 July 1984) is a New Zealand actress. She is most known for her role as Harper Whitley in Shortland Street and Miratrix in Power Rangers Operation Overdrive.

== Career ==
From 2002 to 2006, Vandervis acted in multiple UNITEC theatre productions and short films. Between 2004 and 2006 Vandervis starred in various short films such as the Lovely Creature, A Telling Time, Tough Fortune Cookies and Billy for Lilly as Siren, Julia, Fran and Sarah respectively. In 2007, Vandervis played a supporting role as Cindy Cockburn in the film The Devil Dared Me To. Vandervis also played Miratrix in the TV series Power Rangers Operation Overdrive. In 2009 Vandervis played various television roles, starting in Packed to the Rafters as Layla Soubrani, The Cut, Underbelly and Rescue: Special Ops. In 2010, Vandervis played the regular role of Senior Constable Roxanne Perez in the Nine Network police drama Cops L.A.C. In 2013, Vandervis played Detective Christie Mills in the TV3 police drama Harry.

Later in 2013 Vandervis was cast as Harper Whitley in TV2 New Zealand soap opera Shortland Street. Vandervis was originally hired under a 6-month recurring contract that was later extended to a regular role. Vandervis originally commuted between Dunedin and Auckland for filming. A fan of the soap named her daughter 'Harper Ria' in honour of Vandervis and her character. Vandervis also has stated that she gets stopped for autographs and photos.

== Personal life ==
Vandervis was born in Dunedin in the South Island of New Zealand in 1984. She attended Columba College in the Dunedin suburb of Roslyn, followed by Auckland's UNITEC School of Performing & Screen Arts, where she completed a three-year course in acting. Vandervis later moved to Sydney, Australia to pursue more acting roles. She is married to Chris Ashton as of 2012. When cast in the regular role of Harper Whitley, Vandervis struggled with the extension of her contract due to personal relationship issues and considered quitting the show. She also works as a marriage celebrant and helps out in her husband's clothing business. She is the daughter of Lee Vandervis.

== Filmography ==
Film and television
| Year | Title | Role | Notes |
|---|---|---|---|
| 2004 | Lovely Creature | Siren | Short film |
| 2004 | A Telling Time | Julia | Short film |
| 2005 | Tough Fortune Cookies | Fran | Short film |
| 2006 | Billy for Lilly | Sarah | Short film |
| 2007 | The Devil Dared Me To | Cindy Cockburn | Feature film |
| 2007 | Power Rangers Operation Overdrive | Miratrix | Main role |
| 2009 | Underbelly: A Tale of Two Cities | Kay Reynolds | Episodes: "Stranded", "A Nice Little Earner", "Diamonds", "Judas Kiss" |
| 2009 | The Cut | Vanessa Stewart | TV miniseries |
| 2009 | Rescue: Special Ops | Jasmine | Episode: "Thrillseekers" |
| 2009 | Packed to the Rafters | Layla Soubrani | Recurring role (series 2) |
| 2010 | Cops L.A.C. | Roxanne Perez | Main role |
| 2013 | Harry | Det. Christie Mills | TV series |
| 2013–2024 | Shortland Street | Harper Whitley | Regular role |
