= Ben Barrington =

New Zealand actor

- Born: New Zealand
- Occupation: Actor
- Years active: 2002–present
- Spouse: Kristie Fergus (m. 2019)
- Children: 1

Ben Barrington is a New Zealand actor, is best known for his roles, "Dr. Drew McCaskill" in Shortland Street and Olaf Johnson in The Almighty Johnsons.

== Personal life ==
Barrington married his partner, makeup artist Kristie Fergus, in March 2019. They have a daughter born in 2016.

== Career ==
Barrington was attracted to acting while studying at Waikato University. He graduated from Toi Whakaari: New Zealand Drama School in 2001 with a Bachelor of Performing Arts (Acting). He has appeared in many local productions, including The Insider's Guide To Happiness, The Insider's Guide To Love, The Strip, Outrageous Fortune, and Top of the Lake.

He is best known for his role, "Olaf Johnson" in The Almighty Johnsons.

In 2015, Barrington was a participant in New Zealand's Dancing With the Stars 6.

He mainly stars on Shortland Street as Dr Drew McCaskill, historically as head of the Plastic Surgery Clinic and now as a general surgeon, occasionally taking on surgeries involving plastic surgery . In the 2015 Season Finale Dr Drew McCaskill was shot in the leg once by Gareth demanding revenge and another time in the upper shoulder. He was shot at the end of the episode by Victoria Anderton, the doctor who sought revenge because Drew did not support her placement in General Surgery.

== Filmography ==
Film and television
Year	Title	Role	Notes
2002–03	Revelations – The Initial Journey	Mathius	Recurring role
2002–03	The Strip	Lenny	Recurring role
2004	The Insider's Guide to Happiness	William	Main role
2005	Interrogation	Pete Morgan	Episode: "Where There's Smoke"
2005	The Chronicles of Narnia: The Lion, the Witch and the Wardrobe	Centaur	
2005	The Insider's Guide to Love	William	Episodes: "Who Taught You to Love?", "The Power of Love"
2006–07	Outrageous Fortune	Tyson	Recurring role (series 2–3)
2009	4 Weeks	Luigi	Short
2010	Eruption	Vince	TV film
2011–2013	The Almighty Johnsons	Olaf Johnson	Main role
2013	Top of the Lake	Terry	Recurring role (series 1)
2014	Offspring	Thomas Buchdahl	Main role (series 5)
2014	The Hunting Party	Kale	Short
2015	The Brokenwood Mysteries	Steve	Episode: "Leather and Lace"
2015	Auckward Love	Bryan	Episode: "Good Job"
2015–2026	Shortland Street	Drew McCaskill	Regular role
