= Drew McCaskill =

- Shortland Street character
- Portrayed by: Ben Barrington
- Duration: 2015–2026
- First appearance: 27 July 2015
- Last appearance: 8 April 2026
- Introduced by: Simon Bennett
- Spin-off appearances: Drew’s Christmas Holiday (2018)
In-universe information
- Occupation: Plastic Surgeon; Business Owner
- Mother: Minerva McCaskill
- Brothers: Cam McCaskill
- Wife: Virginia McCaskill (until 2015); Harper Whitley (2017–2024)
- Children: Billie McCaskill; Marley Fraser (adoptive); Skye McCaskill

Drew McCaskill is a fictional character on the New Zealand soap opera Shortland Street, portrayed by Ben Barrington. The character debuted in 2015 as the hospital's new surgeon and remained a series regular until his departure in April 2026.

== Creation and casting ==
Ben Barrington had auditioned for Shortland Street multiple times since 2001, at one point believing "I’ve got to be the only actor in New Zealand who’s never been on the show’", before he was cast as Drew McCaskill ahead of the character's 2015 debut. Barrington was already a familiar face on New Zealand television, having previously starred in the drama Insiders Guide to Happiness, played the god Olaf in The Almighty Johnsons, held a recurring role in the Australian series Offspring, and appeared on Dancing with the Stars NZ before joining the Shortland Street cast. Introducing Barrington's arrival on the soap, NZ On Screen described Drew as a "playful, provocative, annoying" cosmetic surgeon, brought in to shake up the hospital's Plastics Unit. Portraying Drew was the longest television stint Barrington had secured, believing himself to be very "lucky" to be on the soap. He was relieved to have joined as a "mature" actor due to the screen-sharing with "more experienced and seasoned" colleagues, and had his annual contract renewed each year.

In 2025 following waning ad revenue and a new funding model, Shortland Street was cut from 5-episodes a week to 3, that would air across the year in 4 "mini-seasons". After a largely medical-based storyline season throughout 2025, Producers chose to premiere a "Legacy" mini-season the following year that would have a "tonal-shift" to the soap's original tone, featuring more humour and light-hearted storylines. The former season had already completed filming with Barrington as part of the regular cast, with his reflection on subsequent conversations being, "They just go, ‘how’s our product gonna look like next year’, and ‘we’re not going to have these people involved’ and move things around" with the character of Drew being axed in a "ruthless" decision by Producers. He made his final appearance during the show's finale in December 2025, unaware it would be his final day on set after a decade. Following a "little bit of back and forth-ing” with Producers around his contract, Barrington convinced them, "we actually can’t have your character just disappear in a puff of smoke" and Drew was reintroduced for an exit storyline some months later. His final episode aired in April.

== Character development ==
Drew's early storylines centred on the hospital's 2015 Christmas cliffhanger, a 90-minute siege episode in which gunman Gareth Hutchins took the hospital's Christmas party hostage. Drew, whom Hutchins blamed for his estrangement from his daughter, was shot twice by him before a second, unidentified gunman shot Drew a third time as he lay wounded. Drew survived in an induced coma, and coverage of the episode's aftermath noted that his colleague Harper Whitley's feelings for him became apparent as she kept vigil at his bedside instead of leaving on her honeymoon with her intended husband, Boyd Rolleston.

In 2018, Drew was the focus of Drew's Christmas Holiday, a comedic short-form digital spin-off released on TVNZ On Demand over the summer break, following Drew's misadventures during a holiday staycation organised by Boyd. That same year, Drew and Harper became parents to Billy, whose birth as an intersex child made him the show's first intersex character.

Drew's marriage was later tested by an affair between Harper and junior doctor Phil Grayson, which fans online dubbed "Pharper". Harper was killed off at the end of 2024, when she and Drew were preparing to leave New Zealand together and their motorbike crashed during the show's Christmas cliffhanger.

Speaking to TV Tonight in 2024, Barrington characterised Drew as fundamentally egotistical and always needing to prove himself, noting a recurring pattern in which the character's attempts to outdo other people ultimately backfired on him.

=== Relationship with Harper Whitley ===
Drew's central relationship throughout his run was with fellow doctor Harper Whitley, played by Ria Vandervis. In late 2015, previews of that year's Christmas cliffhanger episode reported that Harper, who was engaged to colleague Boyd Rolleston, had developed feelings for Drew that were complicating her decision to marry Boyd. After Drew was shot in that episode, coverage of the storyline's fallout noted that Harper's feelings for him had become clear to viewers as she stayed at his bedside during his coma.

Drew and Harper went on to marry in an outdoor ceremony in August 2017, described by entertainment site The Spinoff as one of the show's best weddings. The marriage produced a son, Billy, whose 2018 birth as an intersex child was a significant storyline for the show. It was later strained by Harper's affair with colleague Phil Grayson, nicknamed "Pharper" by fans.

The marriage came to an end in the show's 2024 Christmas cliffhanger, when Harper died in a motorbike crash as the couple prepared to move overseas together, coinciding with Vandervis's real-life departure from the cast. Drew's storylines in the years following her death were shaped by that loss, ahead of his own exit from the show in 2026.

== Reception ==
Drew's marriage to Harper became one of the show's most closely followed relationships, and its various affairs generated fan-coined nicknames online, including "Pharper" for the Phil Grayson storyline. The 2018 storyline in which Drew and Harper's son Billy was born intersex drew a largely positive response from viewers and was praised as groundbreaking representation for New Zealand television, though some felt the writing was clumsy.

Critical response to the character himself was initially mixed: reviewing the fallout from the 2015 cliffhanger, a New Zealand Herald columnist was dismissive of Drew, writing that "love rats like him come and go". Reflecting on the role in 2024, Barrington said that of everything in his career, he felt he had done his best work on the show, and described himself as one of the "lucky ones" among long-running New Zealand television cast members.
