= List of Shortland Street characters introduced in 2012 =

The following is a list of characters that first appeared in the New Zealand soap opera Shortland Street in 2012, by order of first appearance.

== Rose Moore ==
Rose Moore
- Shortland Street character
- Portrayed by: Nicole Tubiola
- First appearance: 9 February 2012
- Last appearance: 6 March 2012
- Introduced by: Steven Zanoski
In-universe information
- Occupation: Councillor

Rose Moore was Hunter McKay's (Lee Donoghue) drug councillor who witnessed him buying drugs in rehab and was forced to expel him. She was later hired by Callum (Peter Mochrie) to work at the Shortland Street rehab clinic and again became Hunter's councillor. However, when Hunter discovered Rose wanted to become a doctor, he became too attached to Rose and she quit so as not to hinder his drug rehabilitation.

== Hayley O'Neill ==
Hayley O'Neill
- Shortland Street character
- Portrayed by: Michelle Blundell
- First appearance: 17 February 2012
- Last appearance: 21 May 2012
- Introduced by: Steven Zanoski
In-universe information
- Occupation: Teacher; Tutor

Hayley Jane O'Neill was the obsessive maths tutor of Phoenix Raynor (Geordie Holibar). Hayley grew dependent on Phoenix's father Chris (Michael Galvin) when her boyfriend Drew (Joel Herbert) started to abuse her. She began to string Phoenix along romantically in pursuit of Chris and made out that Phoenix was stalking her. Hayley then began to manipulate the hospital staff and Chris' girlfriend Rachel (Angela Bloomfield) into the belief that she and Chris were having an affair. After destroying Chris' family and professional life, Hayley returned to Drew only to be intensely beaten and found by Chris. She died from her injuries on 21 May and Chris ended up arrested for her murder.

Hayley has been described as; "Shorty's most maddening, manipulative and terrifyingly psychotic character in ages" and the show's most compelling storyline of the year. Michael Galvin believed that Hayley was possibly the soap's most successful villain, citing the immense uproar she caused amongst viewers.

== Marcel Fohn ==
Marcel Fohn
- Shortland Street character
- Portrayed by: Ethan Bai
- Appears on: 28 February 2012
- Introduced by: Steven Zanoski

Marcel Fohn was Harry Warner's (Reid Walker) best friend that was frequently mentioned but never appeared on screen until his single guest appearance in February 2012. Prior to his appearance, the show's writers would constantly write inappropriate jokes about him due to his constant references on screen. He was portrayed by Ethan Bai, the boy who featured prominently in the 2011 Rugby World Cup opening ceremony. Marcel appeared onscreen when Harry borrowed peanut butter off him so as to frame Hayley (Michelle Blundell) for putting it in Phoenix's (Geordie Holibar) sandwich, who was allergic. In 2014 Harry stated that he and Marcel were no longer friends as he was a "nerd" but nonetheless bid him farewell in December when the Warners planned to move country.

== Kronos ==
Kronos
- Shortland Street character
- Portrayed by: Fred
- Duration: 2012, 2014
- First appearance: 29 February 2012
- Last appearance: 7 November 2014
- Introduced by: Steven Zanoski (2012); Simon Bennett (2014)

Kronos appeared in several guest stints in both 2012 and 2014. He was named after the cat owned by a relative of the shows head writer. Kronos was the household cat owned by Luke Durville (Gerald Urquhart). Luke's girlfriend Bella (Amelia Reid-Meredith) disliked the cat and Luke was shocked in February 2012 when he ate her pet mouse. He bought a substitute mouse in the hope Bella would not realise, only for Kronos to kill it as well. Brooke Freeman (Beth Allen) and her sister Bree (Rachael Blampied) later tried to kidnap the cat to scare Luke into moving out, only to fail after Kronos savagely attacked them. On Halloween 2014, Bella was shocked when Kronos arrived to the Cooper household, making her believe that Luke's spirit opposed to her engagement to Dallas Adams (Cameron Jones). Dallas clashed heavily with Kronos and matters came to a head when he had the cat neutered out of spite. Ultimately, Bella realised the presence of Kronos was too much of a reminder of the past and let Lucy (Grace Palmer) adopt the cat.

== Drew Webster ==
Drew Webster
- Shortland Street character
- Portrayed by: Joel Herbert
- First appearance: 9 March 2012
- Last appearance: 16 July 2012
- Introduced by: Steven Zanoski
In-universe information
- Occupation: Labourer

Drew Webster was the abusive boyfriend of Hayley (Michelle Blundell). Hayley fled Drew in March and he aggressively confronted her at the Warner mansion. Chris (Michael Galvin) later tracked Hayley to his house, where Drew attacked him only to be knocked out by Chris' son Phoenix (Geordie Holibar). Drew didn't lay complaints but continued to beat Hayley. The two broke up but Hayley returned to him several months later, only for him to beat her intensely and end up killing her. Chris was framed for the murder, but when Phoenix began to collect evidence on Drew, Drew kidnapped him and when threatened by police, he confessed to the crime and was arrested.

== Josh Gallagher ==
Dr. Josh Gallagher first appeared during the show's 20th anniversary, portrayed by Chris Tempest. He appeared until January 2014.

== Adam Vailalo ==
Adam Vailalo
- Shortland Street character
- Portrayed by: Lachlan Conquer (2012); Hahano Maka (2013); Dylan Keereweer-Taia (2013)
- Duration: 2012–2013
- First appearance: 25 June 2012
- Last appearance: 29 July 2013
- Introduced by: Steven Zanoski (2012); Simon Bennett (2013)
In-universe information
- Father: Tom Stanton
- Mother: Ula Levi
- Adoptive father: Matt Vailalo
- Adoptive mother: Sue Vailalo
- Grandmothers: Vasa Levi
- Uncles: Matt Stanton

Adam Vailalo was the illegitimate son of the 16-year-old Ula Levi (Frankie Adams) and Tom Stanton (Henry Beasley). He was adopted shortly after birth by Matt and Sue Vailalo (Melanie Prince). In 2013 Ula reunited with Adam when he came down with the flu under her job as a paramedic. Ula was shocked that Matt and Sue had separated and attempted to legally reclaim her child. Vasa (Teuila Blakely) managed to talk Ula around but ensured the adoption would become open for Ula to look after the baby.

== Jared Afeaki ==
Jared Afeaki
- Shortland Street character
- Portrayed by: Beulah Koale
- Duration: 2012–2014
- First appearance: 4 July 2012
- Last appearance: 9 September 2014
- Introduced by: Steven Zanoski (2012); Simon Bennett (2014)
In-universe information
- Occupation: Soldier; Orderly
- Father: Gus Afeaki
- Aunts: Nellie Afeaki

Jared Afeaki made his first appearance in July 2012, portrayed by Beulah Koale. Koale had been contacted by a casting agent and upon auditioning, was offered the role the same day. Koale initially portrayed the role for a minor guest appearance before returning in a recurring manner and later having his contract extended. Jared departed on 28 May 2013. Jared returned in August 2014.

Jared first appeared in early July when Phoenix Raynor (Geordie Holibar) tried to use his gang connections to retrieve a stolen car that could release Chris (Michael Galvin) from prison. Jared struggled to accept the fact his father Gus (Joe Folau) had cancer and refused to leave his gang. However Jared started living with the Warner's but clashed with Rachel (Angela Bloomfield) when he came under suspicion for the rape of Roimata (Shavaughn Ruakere). Following Gus' death, Jared struggled with the Warner life style and eventually moved in with Gus' lover, Vasa Levi (Teuila Blakely) and started to date her daughter Ula (Frankie Adams). However inadequacies in his lifestyle, lead Jared to break it off and pursue a career in the army out of Ferndale. Jared returned in August 2014 and announced his love to Ula. However, when Jared dramatically abandoned the army for her, it soon became apparent he was actually nervous about travelling to Afghanistan. Rachel talked Jared through it and he ended up leaving for service.

== Boyd Rolleston ==
Boyd Rolleston is a fictional character on the New Zealand soap opera Shortland Street portrayed by Sam Bunkall. He made his first screen appearance on the episode broadcast on 13 September 2012.

== Kylie Brown ==
Kylie Warner (previously Connelly also Brown) is a fictional character on the New Zealand soap opera Shortland Street portrayed by Kerry-Lee Dewing. She made her first screen appearance on the episode broadcast on 24 September 2012.

== Emma Franklin ==
Emma Franklin
- Shortland Street character
- Portrayed by: Amy Usherwood
- Duration: 2012–2014
- First appearance: 25 September 2012
- Last appearance: September 2014
- Introduced by: Steven Zanoski
In-universe information
- Occupation: Nurse
- Father: Brett Franklin
- Half-brothers: Toby Reynolds

Emma Franklin first appeared in September, portrayed by Amy Usherwood. Emma arrived to Ferndale and got a job as a nurse when her best friend Lana Jacobs (Brooke Williams) informed her that the man they suspected of being a murderer, Boyd Rolleston (Sam Bunkall), had gained a job at the hospital. Emma started a witch hunt against Boyd until she shockingly discovered that Boyd was not the father of the murdered Julia's baby, it was her father Brett (Matt Dwyer). She soon started to distract herself by dating Vinnie Kruse (Pua Magasiva) but he cheated on her with Kylie and she ended up having a brief romance with TK Samuels (Benjamin Mitchell). In August 2013 she became a foster mother to her half brother Toby (Robert Evison) and later began to date Dallas Adams (Cameron Jones). However the two broke up following Dallas kissing Kylie. In early 2014 Emma controversially began to date older man Sam Aleni (Rene Naufahu) but he fell in love with Vasa Levi (Teuila Blakely) and left her. Emma was disturbed when Brett returned to her life and started to fanatically manipulate Toby despite her objections. Toby ended up murdering Brett and Emma briefly took the blame before Toby was charged and relocated to Christchurch. She decided to move closer to him and left Ferndale.

== Henry Lee ==
Henry Lee
- Shortland Street character
- Portrayed by: Peter Huang
- Duration: 2012–2013
- First appearance: 26 October 2012
- Last appearance: 20 August 2013
- Introduced by: Steven Zanoski (2012); Simon Bennett (2013)
In-universe information
- Occupation: Personal Assistant

Henry Lee first appeared in a guest appearance in October 2012. To mark the show's 21st anniversary in 2013, 4 new young characters were introduced, with Henry returning alongside Harper Whitley (Ria Vandervis), Dallas Adams (Cameron Jones) and Dayna Jenkins (Lucy Elliott). Sarah Potts (Amanda Billing) was shocked to meet Henry, the boyfriend of her presumed suitor Seth Packhurst (Toby Leach), after she followed him home in 2012. Several months later, Henry got a job at the hospital and broke up with Seth when he refused to come out.

== Brett Franklin ==
Brett Franklin
- Shortland Street character
- Portrayed by: Matt Dwyer
- Duration: 2012, 2014
- First appearance: 31 October 2012
- Last appearance: 2 July 2014
- Introduced by: Steven Zanoski (2012); Simon Bennett (2014)
In-universe information
- Occupation: Doctor
- Sons: Toby Reynolds
- Daughters: Emma Franklin

Dr. Brett Franklin first appeared in October 2012, portrayed by Matt Dwyer. Emma (Amy Usherwood) was disgruntled when her disproving father Brett arrived in Ferndale but shocked all when he approved of her boyfriend Vinnie Kruse (Pua Magasiva). Emma's best friends Lana (Brooke Williams) and Kylie (Kerry-Lee Dewing) soon started to suspect Brett of having murdered Kylie's sister after allegedly impregnating her in the late nineties. Upon confrontation, Brett admitted to having impregnated her and having run her off the road, but not to having killed her. Kylie's sister Julia (Jessica Joy Wood) soon showed up and confirmed that though she had given birth to Brett's baby, he had not murdered her. Brett paid her off but a disgusted Emma disowned him from her life. Brett returned in May 2014 in an apparent attempt to get to know his son, Toby (Robert Evison). Emma and Kylie eventually allowed Brett to see his son but he became overbearing and even anonymously carried out an assault on Toby's friend Honour Aleni (Sophie McIntosh) to get closer to him. Kylie discovered Brett was terminally ill and he began a neighbour watch squad with Toby to try and harden his son. In June Brett kidnapped Toby and drugged Honour, only to try and kill Toby's friend Kane (KJ Apa) when he tracked them down. Toby hit and killed Brett with a spade during the attack and the two teenagers covered up the murder, posing the crime scene as a suicide.

== Lisa Stone ==
Lisa Stone
- Shortland Street character
- Portrayed by: Caitlin Bossley
- Duration: 2012–2013
- First appearance: 1 November 2012
- Last appearance: 6 February 2013
- Introduced by: Steven Zanoski
In-universe information
- Occupation: Detective

Lisa Stone first appeared at the beginning of November and appeared until early February. Lisa was the serious and intimidating head detective assigned to uncover the man behind the sexual assault of Roimata Samuels (Shavaughn Ruakere). Lisa focused the investigation on many suspects, primarily Boyd Rolleston (Sam Bunkall), Murray Cooper (Matthew Chamberlain) and Zac Smith (Mike Edward). In December, Lisa was physically attacked in the carpark and she believed Zac was behind the attack. She was taken off the case but teamed up with Roimata in a bid to expose Zac. Despite opposition from her co-workers, Lisa later successfully brought Zac down with the help of the hospital staff.

== Julia Reynolds ==
Julia Reynolds
- Shortland Street character
- Portrayed by: Jessica Joy Wood
- Duration: 2012–2016, 2018
- First appearance: 3 December 2012
- Last appearance: 5 June 2018
- Introduced by: Steven Zanoski (2012); Simon Bennett (2013–2015); Maxine Fleming (2016, 2018)
In-universe information
- Mother: Norelle Brown
- Sisters: Kylie Brown
- Husband: Dylan Reinhart (2018) (deceased)
- Sons: Toby Reynolds

Julia Reinhart (previously Reynolds, Brown)(Jessica Joy Wood) made her first appearance in December. Kylie (Kerry-Lee Dewing) was shocked to discover Julia after believing she had been murdered for 13 years. Julia revealed that the father of her child was Kylie's best friend Emma's (Amy Usherwood) father, Brett (Matt Dwyer), who had also tried to murder her. Julia was revealed to have been living in a cult and refused to reconnect with her sister. She was paid off by Brett and fled Ferndale back to her commune. Julia returned in October 2013 to take back her son Toby (Robert Evison) as she had won a job overseas. However Toby pleaded to stay and Julia ended up leaving after giving guardianship to Emma. In mid 2014 Kylie discovered that Julia had gone missing from her job and feared that Brett had murdered her. However it turned out she had fled following Brett's unexpected arrival. She made a brief arrival back to Ferndale after discovering that her son Toby had been taken to prison after murdering Brett. Julia later left Ferndale along with Emma to Christchurch where Toby would get a prison transfer. Julia returns in July 2016 for Kylie's court hearing, where she resides in Sydney. She accused Kylie for assisted euthanasia of their mother, Norelle, but they reconciled after Kylie was found not guilty. In 2018 Julia returned to Ferndale with her new husband Dylan, a university mate of Boyd Rolleston, who was working as a GP in Central Hospital, but was later transferred to Shortland Street as an ED Consultant. Dylan would turn out to be mentally deranged, having killed his previous wife and would succeed in killing Julia by crashing their car into a tree.
