= List of Shortland Street characters introduced in 2014 =

The following is a list of characters that first appeared in the New Zealand soap opera Shortland Street in 2014, by order of first appearance.

== Honour Aleni ==
Honour Aleni
- Shortland Street character
- Portrayed by: Sophie McIntosh
- Duration: 2014–2015
- First appearance: 6 February 2014
- Last appearance: 24 February 2015
- Introduced by: Simon Bennett
In-universe information
- Father: Sam Aleni
- Mother: Alise Aleni
- Grandmothers: Ana Aleni
- Uncles: Nat Aleni

Honour Aleni first appeared in February 2014, portrayed by Sophie McIntosh.

Toby (Robert Evison) quickly grew a crush on Honour but it was clear she was infatuated with his best friend Kane (KJ Apa). However, due to her heavily religious father Sam (Rene Naufahu), Honour was reluctant to date but eventually talked round Kane, only to be cyber bullied by a jealous Harry Warner (Reid Walker). Honour departed Ferndale after being attacked by the deranged Brett Franklin (Matt Dwyer) but returned several months later when she moved into Ula's (Frankie Adams) flat and began to date Kane once again. However, when Honour and Kane started sleeping together, she became rebellious and fell out with Ula. Ultimately she was sent back to live with Sam out of Ferndale.

== Jack Hannah ==
Jack Theodore Hannah first appeared in early 2014 as a minor character, before becoming a more central character later in the year. In 2015 the character was introduced to the core cast and a family unit was created around him.

== Garrett Whitley ==
Garrett Whitley
- Shortland Street character
- Portrayed by: Spencer Falls
- Duration: 2014–2015
- First appearance: 7 May 2014
- Last appearance: 5 May 2015
- Introduced by: Simon Bennett
In-universe information
- Occupation: Doctor; Surgeon
- Father: Steve Whitley
- Sisters: Harper Whitley
- Uncles: Benny Cameron
- Aunts: Miriama Cameron

Dr. Garrett Whitley first appeared in May 2014 portrayed by Spencer Falls. He is the brother of E.D. Doctor, Harper Whitley. Garrett arrives when he is brought into E.D suffering from the effects of synthetic cannabis, Harper agrees to treat him in her exam room, Harper then offers Garrett a place to stay with her with Nicole Miller and Vinnie Kruse. Since arriving in Ferndale he has had brief relationship with Kylie Brown but ended up falling for Ula Levi they ended their relationship after Ula's ex-boyfriend Jared returns from the army but he returns to the army and they get back together however months after they break up. While stationed in ED, TK failed Garrett's rotation. After getting a second chance in surgical, he nearly lost his job again when helping his criminal father Steve Whitley flee the country. Garrett then found himself in more danger while trying to get Harper away from a dodgy crook she was seeing. While both nursing broken hearts, Garrett had a brief romance with Rachel McKenna (Angela Bloomfield) who eventually fell in love with. Unfortunately for him, she later went back to husband Chris Warner. Garrett had a rocky relationship with his mentor Boyd Rolleston, and after being encouraged by his sister, sneaked into the funding conference, and talked to the authority offering the international scholarship under Chris and Garrett's noses, and in the end managed to secure himself a scholarship to finish his medical degree in Basel, Switzerland. In 2016, it was mentioned he was in a critical condition with undisclosed brain injury in Europe.

== Effie Sommers ==
Effie Sommers
- Shortland Street character
- Portrayed by: Faye Rillstone
- First appearance: 14 May 2014
- Last appearance: 7 July 2014
- Introduced by: Simon Bennett
In-universe information
- Occupation: Nurse

Effie Sommers was a nurse at Shortland Street Hospital and was the recurring love interest of E.D House surgeon Garrett Whitley. Effie and Garrett date briefly but Garrett soon began a relationship with Ula Levi instead. Effie later caught a mystery illness from a patient and died as a result.

== Michael Hampton ==
Michael Hampton-Rees
- Shortland Street character
- Portrayed by: Duane Evans Jr.
- Duration: 2014–2017
- First appearance: 21 May 2014
- Last appearance: 13 October 2017
- Introduced by: Simon Bennett
In-universe information
- Father: Vinnie Kruse-Miller
- Mother: Jemima Hampton
- Stepmother: Nicole Kruse-Miller
- Half-brothers: Pele Kruse
- Aunts: Natalia Kruse

Michael Hampton-Rees first appeared in late May 2014, portrayed by Duane Evans Jr. After previously being used as a plot-device and being referenced for years. In 2005 Vinnie Kruse (Pua Magasiva) impregnated British tourist Jemima Hampton (Liesha Ward-Knox) after a brief fling. The two departed in 2006 after they decided to bring up their child in the United Kingdom. In 2011 Vinnie returned to New Zealand having been dumped by Jemima and refused contact with his son. Vinnie made contact with Michael in 2014, resulting in Jemima bringing him for a visit. Michael struggled with the presence of Vinnie's lover Nicole (Sally Martin) in his life but ultimately ended up accepting her. Late in the year, he and Jemima moved to Ferndale to live permanently. Jemima and her controlling former husband wrestled for his guardianship, but when Vinnie finally managed to help Jemima away from her former husband, Michael decided to stay with Vinnie and Nicole. In October 2017 Michael moved with Jemima to Singapore.

== Ava Eriksson ==
Ava Eriksson
- Shortland Street character
- Portrayed by: Siobhan Marshall
- First appearance: 7 July 2014
- Last appearance: 20 August 2014
- Introduced by: Simon Bennett
In-universe information
- Occupation: Doctor

Dr. Ava Eriksson first appeared in early July, portrayed by Siobhan Marshall. Ava is a Doctor of Appearance Medicine. She scored a job at the McKenna House thanks to Brooke Freeman and hired Brooke as her PR representative. Two weeks after she arrived, she started an affair with Brooke's husband, Boyd Rolleston. She was the creator of the lethal drug, Extract 7, which killed 5 people including Nurse Effie Sommers and Sarah Potts and infected 3 other people including CEO Rachel McKenna who survived thanks to Sarah who came up with the cure before she died. She was going to travel overseas with Boyd in tow, but Boyd changed his mind, lured Ava to The I.V, called the cops and got her arrested.

== Steve Whitley ==
Steve Whitley
- Shortland Street character
- Portrayed by: Mark Mitchinson
- First appearance: 10 July 2014
- Last appearance: 2014
- Introduced by: Simon Bennett
In-universe information
- Brothers: Benny Cameron
- Sons: Garrett Whitley
- Daughters: Harper Whitley

Steve Whitley first appeared in early July. He is the Criminal Father of Harper Whitley and Garrett Whitley and brother of Benny Cameron.

== Nev Carlson ==
Neville Carlson
- Shortland Street character
- Portrayed by: Stuart Devenie
- First appearance: 5 August 2014
- Introduced by: Simon Bennett (2014); Maxine Fleming (2018)
In-universe information
- Daughters: Kate Hannah; Zoe Carlson

Nev Carlson first appeared in early August as the love interest of Leanne Miller (Jennifer Ludlam). Nev and Leanne met at 'The IV' bar and hit it off, starting a relationship soon after despite Leanne's daughter Nicole's (Sally Martin) reservations. Leanne began to notice odd behaviour in Nev and picked out lies, resulting in his confession he had previously been married 5 times. The couple recovered from the revelation but Nev ultimately ended up leaving her for one of his former wives.

Nev returned in 2018 to visit Leanne; it was revealed he was the father of Kate Hannah (Laurel Devenie) and Zoe Carlson (Holly Shervey).

== Caleb Potene ==
Caleb Potene
- Shortland Street character
- Portrayed by: Karlos Drinkwater
- Duration: 2014–2015
- First appearance: 21 August 2014
- Last appearance: 20 July 2015
- Introduced by: Simon Bennett
In-universe information
- Occupation: Security advisor Orderly; Paramedic
- Wife: Pania Stevens (2004–2015)

Caleb Potene first appeared in August portrayed by Karlos Drinkwater. He came to Ferndale to support his friend TK Samuels after the death of Sarah Potts. He is the ex-husband of Pania Stevens. He was dishonourably discharged after he drove a jeep while under the influence of drugs. He is the security advisor and ER helper for Shortland Street as he cannot be dealing with drugs despite his expertise as an advanced paramedic, a role he was also discharged from after he stole from the pharmacy as he was still addicted to painkillers. Potene was killed on 20 July 2015 after drug poisoning with propofol, the same drug that, as Lucy mentioned to Clementine, killed Michael Jackson, from ex-partner Pania Stevens. Pania wanted to have his body buried, however his body was switched with an Australian Caucasian man and due to Pania's labeling switch, Potene's body was cremated, as per the Australian family's wishes. The investigation into his death was never started.

== Marnie Dougan ==
Marnie Dougan
- Shortland Street character
- Portrayed by: Hannah Gould
- First appearance: 22 August 2014
- Last appearance: 12 December 2014
- Introduced by: Simon Bennett
In-universe information
- Husband: Joel Duggan

Marnie Dougan, portrayed by Hannah Gould, first appeared in late August. Marnie was the midwife of a young mother but underwent an extreme bout of food poisoning, resulting in teenager Evan Cooper (Tyler Read) helping with the birth of the woman's baby. In the aftermath of the birth, Evan and Marnie became close and fell in love despite Marnie being married. After several break-ups and pressure from Evan's parents, the two decided to run away together. However Marnie decided to give her marriage another go and Evan ended up leaving on a yacht. Marnie reappeared several months later when she appeared in her role of midwife, helping with the birth of Nicole Miller (Sally Martin)'s son.

== Lucy Rickman ==
Lucy Rickman, played by Grace Palmer, made her first appearance on 25 August 2014. She was introduced as a mysterious person with an obsession to the hospital CEO Rachel McKenna (Angela Bloomfield). It was later revealed that her father had an affair with Rachel ultimately destroying her family. Rachel and Lucy soon bond a mother-daughter like friendship and she moves in with Rachel later down the line she falls in love with ambo Ali even though he is in an arranged marriage because of his religion, however these feelings of love were too powerful and Ali chooses Lucy and despite his parents wishes, they later go on to get married and have a baby. Fast forward a few years and lucy's baby (Lulu) is ready to be born rushing to the hospital Ali and Lucy get trapped in the mid-summer Ferndale eruption causing lucy to have to give birth in the back seat of her car. She gives birth to Lulu and makes it to hospital but soon goes into cardiac arrest and dies leaving Ali and Lulu alone. Lucy was a bubbly character who sadly had a shocking end in Ferndale

== Trinity Kwan ==
Trinity Kwan
- Shortland Street character
- Portrayed by: Maya Ruriko Doura (2014); Elska Phipps (2026–)
- Duration: 2014, 2026–
- First appearance: 1 October 2014
- Introduced by: Simon Bennett (2014); Oliver Driver (2026)
In-universe information
- Family: Warner
- Father: Chris Warner
- Mother: Grace Kwan Rachel McKenna (stepmother) Toni Thompson (stepmother) Alison Raynor (stepmother) Tiffany Pratt (stepmother) Michelle Beaufort (stepmother) Vivianne Ewell (stepmother)
- Half-brothers: Frank Burton; Finn Connelly; Phoenix Raynor; Kirk Kwan; Scott Kwan; Harry Warner; James Warner
- Half-sisters: Sarah Burton
- Grandfathers: Sir Bruce Warner; Ken Kwan
- Grandmothers: Margot, Lady Warner; Joy Kwan
- Uncles: Guy Warner
- Aunts: Amanda Warner
- First cousins: Tuesday Warner; Kelly Piper

Trinity Margot Kwan first appeared when she was born onscreen in October 2014. Following a head injury in late 2013, Chris Warner (Michael Galvin) decided to have another child and recruited Grace Kwan (Lynette Forday) to mother it. Once Grace became pregnant, she fell in love with Chris but to protect his wife Rachel (Angela Bloomfield), she decided to flee the country. Grace's best friend Brooke (Beth Allen) pretended she had suffered a miscarriage while Grace moved to Australia. Chris later discovered the truth but kept it from Rachel. In October, Grace ended up giving birth to her daughter while visiting Fiji and she and Chris named her Trinity. Trinity and Grace moved to Australia in December, but were visited many times over the next year by Chris and his family. Trinity returns in late 2026, following the death of her mother Grace

== Clementine Dean ==
Clementine Dean
- Shortland Street character
- Portrayed by: Karima Madut
- Duration: 2014–2015
- First appearance: 13 November 2014
- Last appearance: 3 August 2015
- Introduced by: Simon Bennett
In-universe information
- Occupation: Receptionist
- Brothers: Alex Dean

Clementine Dean first appeared in November 2014 portrayed by Karima Madut. Clementine was quick to become friends with Honour Aleni but Honour worries she is a bad influence. Clem's older adopted brother Alex recently showed up at Shortland Street which has been both a blessing and a curse for the teenager. Whilst she loves him dearly, she often feels like Alex steals her thunder and attracts the attention she desperately craves for herself. Sibling rivalry is alive and running rampant in the Dean clan at the moment! In 2015, Clementine was paralysed from an assault from a patient and is transferred to Christchurch for further treatment, with Alex leaving with her.

== Pania Stevens ==
Pania Stevens
- Shortland Street character
- Portrayed by: Bree Peters
- Duration: 2014–2015, 2023
- First appearance: 9 December 2014
- Last appearance: 25 January 2023
- Introduced by: Simon Bennett (2014); Oliver Driver (2023)
In-universe information
- Husband: Caleb Potene (2004–2015)

Dr. Pania Stevens first appeared in December 2014, portrayed by Bree Peters. Pania is the wife of TK's best friend, Caleb. After her husband, Caleb, left to Afghanistan as a Medical Officer, Pania was persuaded to stay in Ferndale by TK. She worked at Shortland Street as a Locum. Frustrated by the constant – and often losing – battle for funding at the health clinic she operated in her rural hometown, Pania soon sets her sights on getting a job as a GP at Shortland Street. She aims to build it up in a similar vein, both to benefit the local community and put her name up in lights. Because for Pania, it's also an exercise in empire building, as what she has will never be enough for her.

She is very protective of TK and began to fall in love with him to the point of obsession. Pania decided that she wanted to divorce Caleb to get closer to TK. She made Lucy stay away from TK after they had a fling. After Caleb noticed Pania's obsession with TK, she took advantage of his drug issue and spread lies about him. Pania made TK believe that Caleb was in desperate need of help. Caleb became jealous of her professional and personal involvement with TK and started to call her out in front of TK. Despite TK not believing him, Pania still thought of Caleb as an obstacle in her attempt at winning him over. She attempted to drug Caleb many times. After ending up in hospital due to an overdose at the hands of his wife, Pania tried to murder Caleb by giving him a lethal dose of propofol. Caleb woke up and fought back, leaving scratches on Pania's arm... but he was too weak and was killed. TK's girlfriend and Pania's enemy Kylie, got suspicious of Pania and decided to try to find out how Caleb was really killed and bring Pania to justice. Pania stalked, nearly ran over and drugged Kylie over several weeks before she finally hijacked her car with Tillie Potts inside. Pania drove out of town, refusing to answer TK's desperate phone calls after he realised that she is responsible for Caleb's death after-all. TK eventually finds Pania lurking over a cliff with Tillie by her side. He declares his love for her, in a desperate attempt to save his daughter but Pania reassures TK that she would never hurt Tillie and she gives herself up to the police.

TK told Kylie days after the incident that Pania tried to contact him, but he never wants to see her again.

Pania would reprise her role in 2023, as Maeve Mullen's cellmate after she was framed for her son's murder. Pania asked Maeve about TK, and the two formed a bond. She was later stabbed and killed in a prison fight.

== Pele Kruse-Miller ==
Pele Kruse-Miller
- Shortland Street character
- Portrayed by: Feleti Peter Aulika (2014–2024); Athens Koloi (2024)
- Duration: 2014–2024
- First appearance: 11 December 2014
- Last appearance: 20 December 2024
- Introduced by: Simon Bennett
In-universe information
- Father: Vinnie Kruse
- Mother: Nicole Miller
- Half-brothers: Michael Hampton-Rees
- Half-sisters: Kiri Miller
- Grandfathers: William Miller
- Grandmothers: Leanne Black
- Uncles: Eddie Adams; Eric Miller
- Aunts: Morgan Braithwaite; Natalia Kruse
- First cousins: Kiwa Adams
