= Rachel McKenna =

- Shortland Street character
- Portrayed by: Angela Bloomfield
- Duration: 1993–1999, 2001–2003, 2007, 2009–2016, 2026
- First appearance: 15 January 1993
- Last appearance: 17 November 2026
- Introduced by: Brian Lenanne (1993); Lisa Page (2001); Jason Daniel (2007); Steven Zanoski (2009); Oliver Driver (2026)
- Book appearances: Nick's Story – Shortland Street Books (1996)
In-universe information
- Occupation: CEO of Shortland Street Hospital; 2IC Of Shortland Street Hospital; District Health Board Representative; Administration/HR Manager; Social Worker; Bar owner
- Father: Michael McKenna
- Mother: Alex McKenna
- Brothers: Jonathon McKenna
- Husband: Nick Harrison (1995–1998); Daniel Buchanan (1999–2001); Jeremy Tyler (2007–2014); Chris Warner (2014–2018)
- Grandmothers: May McKenna
- Uncles: John Wilson
- Aunts: Shirley McKenna; Trish Wilson
- First cousins: Waverley Harrison; Stratford Wilson; Amberley Wilson

Rachel McKenna is a fictional character from the New Zealand soap opera Shortland Street, played by Angela Bloomfield and who made her first appearance in early 1993. Bloomfield left the role in late 1999, before returning in early 2001 and departing in early 2003. She returned in a guest role in mid-2007 and again in a full-time role in late 2009 before departing once again in late 2016. Bloomfield reprised the role in the first set of 2026 episodes, subtitled Legacy.

Arriving as part of the McKenna family unit, Rachel debuted in early 1993 alongside her mother Alex (Liddy Holloway), the estranged wife of Clinic Director Michael McKenna (Paul Gittins). The family were later joined by Rachel's homosexual brother Jonathon (Kieren Hutchison). Originally a love interest for "heart throb" Stuart Neilson (Martin Henderson), Rachel would go through numerous boyfriends and four husbands including a "will they, won't they?" romance with Chris Warner (Michael Galvin), spanning more than 15 years. She was known for her covering of "ethical issues" such as storylines that featured bulimia, near death experiences, alcoholism, student loan protests, child abuse and being hit by lightning. Her friendship with Nick Harrison (Karl Burnett) spanned numerous years, saw the two become an iconic coupling and even become briefly married during a protest about student allowances.

The character is one of the shows longest running characters and has been labelled as hugely iconic. Many of her storylines have been praised, such as her relationships and "ethical storylines". Bloomfield has been celebrated for her portrayal, winning several awards including "Best Actress" and "Sexiest Female" in TV Guide reader polls.

== Creation and casting ==
To broaden viewing audiences and assure they were reaching key demographics, producers incorporated characters into Shortland Street that centred around key-archetypes and family units (middle aged parents, teenage children). Shortly into the show's first season, it was decided to expand on the original-cast member, Clinic Director Michael McKenna (Paul Gittins) (who had appeared since the show's first episode), by introducing his family. A key demographic for the soap was teenagers, specifically women. As such, a 16-year-old daughter was created in the form of Michael's daughter Rachel. She was penned as a love interest for established "heart throb" teenager, Stuart Neilson (Martin Henderson). Angela Bloomfield won the role in August 1992 and did not realise the significance of the show nor the character until much later. She was signed to an initial 5-week contract. Rachel's first scenes involved her leaving the shower in just a towel, an experience Bloomfield described as, "terrifying". Bloomfield believed the role took over her life and that she, "used Rachel to become capable of having a huge argument with partner or parents. After a couple of years I decided I wasn't being true to myself." The storyline where Rachel became an alcoholic proved too heavy for Bloomfield, and to relax following such intense scenes, Bloomfield performed meditation with co-star, Robyn Malcolm (Nurse Ellen Crozier). By the late nineties, Bloomfield had grown sick of the role and quit. The character made her last appearance on 23 September 1999. Rachel was written off in a storyline that saw her leave the country, intentionally leaving the door open for a return in case Bloomfield wished to reprise the role at a later date.

Executive producer Tony Holden asked Bloomfield to reprise the role several times over the next year, to which she declined for a later date. However she soon started to miss the job and when she was offered the role again in late 2000, happily accepted. Television New Zealand assured fans they would not be let down by Rachel's return alongside original character Chris Warner (Michael Galvin), as they would bring a lot of "spice" to the soap. Rachel made her return on screen on 5 February 2001. However once again Bloomfield felt weighed down by the role and found it difficult to stand such a hard nosed character. As the character of Rachel developed into a cold and bitter alcoholic, Bloomfield found herself struggling to identify with her like she previously had, "I think I've grown up, while recently Rachel seems to have regressed." She found the storyline where Rachel had her tubes tied and later shook a baby too hard to do and when producers refused to tone the character down, she quit the show and left in 2002. Bloomfield commented, "Throughout my twenties, I have concentrated almost totally on the show ... But at the same time I've had to grow personally and I did that by myself ... Now it is time for me to put those books down and spend the next 10 years just living." Rachel made her last appearance on 14 February 2003. Whilst taking up a role as a director, Bloomfield agreed to briefly reprise the role in a cameo appearance to celebrate the show's 15th anniversary in June 2007. Bloomfield found it unusual acting after having directed for several years, but was made welcome by co star Michael Galvin (Chris Warner), "I haven't been in front of the camera on this set for such a long time that it felt weird .... Acting with Michael was the easiest part of the job .... Whenever I was on set with anyone else I was nervous, but when I was with him, I felt relaxed."

In early 2009 Bloomfield agreed to reprise the role full-time and was forced to keep the return a secret for much of the year. She signed an initial 9-month contract. Rachel made her reappearance on the show on 23 October 2009. After years of work behind the camera, Bloomfield found her stint a lot more "taxing" and struggled with Rachel's "anti-children" sentiment. Following the show's 20th anniversary, Bloomfield acknowledged the importance she had gained due to her longevity and experience on the show, "I've realised over time that new actors take their cues from us oldies, just like I did from Elizabeth McRae (Marj Brasch) and Paul Gittins (Michael McKenna). What we do has quite an influence on how they are." In 2013, following the 20th anniversary of Rachel's first appearance on the show, Bloomfield announced her intention to stay on with the show in what she saw as a, "perfect fit". However the following year after the axing of Amanda Billing (Sarah Potts), Bloomfield decided she would leave the show in the coming years. In 2016 she quit the role. Bloomfield found that Rachel became a "middle-man", facilitating other characters storylines until her exit storyline. She described the character as an, "agitated woman" that resulted in her being type-cast in the "intense woman box" outside the show and being, "one of the reasons I had to leave because I just couldn’t keep doing that ... anymore." She had been planning to quit for "a couple" years but it, "felt like the right time for me and you know, it is really hard to break away from that show." Producer Maxine Fleming decided Rachel needed an appropriate exit storyline, saying that it, "needed to be dramatic and give some sense of closure for Rachel and the characters close to her." It was decided not to kill Rachel off in case Bloomfield wished to reprise the role at a later date. Fleming said killing Rachel was never an option, "we've killed off a lot of people and ... you take away the potency if you do it too many times through the years." Rachel made her final appearance on 6 October 2016. Six months later, Bloomfield returned to the show as a director for the show's 25th anniversary. She said she would be happy to return as Rachel to "resolve her storyline".

In 2025 following waning ad revenue and a new funding model, Shortland Street was cut from 5-episodes a week to 3, that would air across the year in 4 "mini-seasons". After a largely medical-based storyline season throughout 2025, Producers chose to premiere a "Legacy" mini-season the following year that would have a "tonal-shift" to the soap's original tone, featuring more humour and light-hearted storylines. Bloomfield had been asked several times to reprise her role since departing 9 years prior and always declined, but eventually agreed upon hearing about "Legacy" as, "the storyline felt strong, and timing wise it was perfect." Bloomfield took some time to re-adjust to playing Rachel as she "wanted the audience, from the second they saw her, to go, "wow, she's just dominating like she used to" ... it took me a couple of weeks to find that amongst all these new actors and this new way of filming the show." Alongside Rachel, "Legacy" also saw the returns of David Kearney (Peter Elliott) and Libby Jeffries (Fleur Saville), with Producer Oliver Driver believing the three characters were "Icons. Trouble magnets. Agents of chaos" who helped in "owning" the past of Shortland Street. Rachel's return was announced in a trailer for the new-season airing after the 2025 Christmas cliffhanger.

== Development ==
Earlier appearances of Rachel saw her portrayed as a selfish teenager.

=== Characterisation ===
The teenage Rachel was "bolshy" and vastly different from later appearances, being a lot more selfish. She was said to be clever and attractive and fierce like her mother and was once referred to as a, "stroppy little madam who always has to get her own way." When Bloomfield was cast, she read the character synopsis and was pleasantly surprised, "That defensive, overconfident, angry little girl. I can do that, for some reason. She was the sarcastic, say-all-the-things-you-want-to-say-but-no-one-ever-does kid ... She felt she had a high status, and though she really didn't, she gave that to herself and that's a self-defence mechanism." Television New Zealand described her first love as being with, "her mother's credit card" and it was noted that by 1995, Rachel had become the "hippest" thing on New Zealand television due to her parents fortune allowing her to have a vast wardrobe. This was said to be a large change from the "schoolgirl in a miniskirt" who first arrived to the show in 1993. She was said to be physically mature but mentally had a lot of growing to do and also had a "ruthless streak". Bloomfield described the teenage Rachel as "messed up" but praised this aspect of her personality as it allowed her to play "a whole array of emotions". The character is known for her "sharp tongue" and "quick wit". By the mid nineties, it was said that Rachel had, "acquired a calmer approach to life and is looking at the bigger picture for the first time. Now she's into helping others besides herself and is learning to take more of the good with the bad." Bloomfield has stated that due to the characters personality being; "hostile, caustic and aggressive", it made it difficult to continuously play the role. This characterisation of a woman who was, "intense and didn’t suffer fools" contributed to Bloomfield leaving the show in 2016.

Rachel is known to cover "ethical storylines" over melodrama, something which Bloomfield believes leads Rachel to act like she does. Bloomfield believed Rachel was a true portrayal of a working woman in the 21st century, stating, "Rachel represents many modern women. She's crammed so much into her twenties that it's almost as if she needs to step back and reassess her life." During Rachel's 2007 return, Bloomfield described her as not being, "completely the same Rachel. She's all about work now, any time they discuss her personal life she brings it back to how it supports her work agenda." Bloomfield realised while at voice training, that she did not like Rachel as a person and would struggle to be friends with her in reality. Producer Steven Zanoski described Rachel's personality as; "Independent, feisty and always quotable". Rachel has been described as the person who; "says all those things you're too scared to say but you wish you could. She'll do it her way, thanks very much, and she doesn't suffer fools." Upon her return in 2009, Rachel took on a more antagonistic role, being labelled a "villain" and a "home-wrecker". Rachel has been described as a "glossy little rich bitch" and a "bossy boots". Bloomfield found it hard to understand some of Rachel's personal motives, saying; "She doesn't need to be liked, but she likes to be loved and respected. So although I don't believe she is at one with herself she is hopeful. There haven't been too many triumphs for Rachel." Bloomfield believed that Rachel acted differently depending on whom she was with, "there were a few she loved and when you saw her feel protected and loved you got to see a softer side of her. But then again, when the shit hits the fan, all she can fall back on is self-preservation. She's very flawed in a way where she didn't realise people could see her flaws but it doesn't take much to pick holes in her."

=== The McKenna family ===
Shortland Street has a constant thoroughfare of family units to help attract and widen the target demographics. In 1992 Adrian Keeling who portrayed patriarch of the Neilson family unit, Tom, quit his role in the soap. Producers realised there would be a notable gap in demographics and the decision was made to expand on the already established character of hospital CEO, Michael McKenna (Paul Gittins). The McKenna family arrived to screens in early 1993. A writer of the show, Liddy Holloway, was cast as Michael's estranged wife Alex McKenna and Gittins would often joke that she wrote her character the best lines. Also in the family unit were teenagers, Rachel and Jonathon McKenna (Kieren Hutchison). The character of Jonathon was written as gay and the storyline proved both controversial and groundbreaking, with Michael's reluctance to accept his son highly topical. Rachel and Jonathon's relationship was depicted as that of a typical brother and sister, as it was said Jonathon was, "protective of his baby sister but often finds himself competing wither her for parental funds and attention." The family unit also saw the introduction of Alex's niece, Waverley Wilson (Claire Chitham), who stayed on the soap for many years, becoming one of its most iconic characters. Bloomfield became good friends with Chitham, who helped her give up smoking. The family dynamics that were brought on by the McKennas, were later praised with the show receiving a makeover in 2001 to try and comply with the benchmark set by Michael and his family. The family was later compared to Shortland Street's equivalent of the royal family. The McKenna family disbanded in 1995 when Michael and Alex departed the show. Jonathon appeared in several more stints while Rachel stayed as a central character on the soap for many years. The departures of the McKenna family made a large impact on Rachel, with Bloomfield citing her parents' divorce and Jonathon's absence as reasons behind Rachel being "vulnerable". When Bloomfield quit in 1999, Hutchison was scared that the iconic McKenna family would permanently be gone from the show, but was delighted when she returned several years later.

Gittins enjoyed the introduction of the family unit, stating; "I started off as a single character, and then the family was created. I really enjoyed the father-daughter relationship because I have a young daughter. The McKenna family was incredibly dysfunctional. I enjoyed that ... We were the totally '90s dysfunctional family: conflict between the husband and wife, rebellious daughter, gay son, a wife living close to the edge, alcoholism, workaholicism, and stress. It was more exciting – and made for good drama." In 2002, Alex returned to the show after faking her death 4 years beforehand. Producer Harriet Crampton believed the strained relationship between her and Rachel worked as a result of longevity, "We could only do that with a character who's been on the show for so long that we know she has issues in her past." The two surviving members of the McKenna family reunited in 2011 after 15 years, when Jonathon returned to the show in a 6-month recurring stint. Hutchison was quoted as saying: "It was really nice to have some familiar faces in the building. Being able to work with Angela and Michael [Galvin] (Chris Warner) again has been fantastic." Rachel was at first touched with the thought that Jonathon had returned to reconnect with his family, though it was soon obvious he had only returned to seek brain surgery after a devastating car crash. The relationship between the two characters maintained its level of closeness, with Bloomfield explaining the McKenna family, "don't cuddle .... there's always something else going on." Though overjoyed at the return of Hutchison to the set, to make the partnership believable, Bloomfield had to get reminded to keep the sibling-ship at arm's length, "We constantly have to be reminded that the (emotional) stuff doesn't come easily for Rachel and Jonathon. There was a scene where Jonathan said, 'I love you' and we had to act like 'Uuughgh!' .... If my own brother had said that I'd say, 'I love you too.'" Bloomfield believed that the absence and early deaths of Rachel's parents influenced the characters development, "She lost them way too soon and she was alone in the world and all she had to fall back on was how they were, which is 'play hard or go home and don't put up with people's bullshit'. So she's really brittle and hard but didn't suffer fools and got to say really good lines."

=== Ethical issues ===
Shortland Street is often used by producers as a tool to tackle large issues in a method to provide drama and character development. Rachel's storyline's would often see her participate in these "ethical issues". Bloomfield enjoyed this aspect of her character, "It's about New Zealander's going, "This is mine. I can Own this. This is our voice."" By the time Rachel was just 17 on the soap, she had already featured in some of the soap's most, "challenging story lines". One of Rachel's earliest story lines in 1993, was the revelation she was suffering from bulimia, a highly topical illness at the time. Bloomfield thought it was important to correctly portray Rachel's diagnosis of both bulimia and anorexia, "It's very rare for people to have bulimia and then anorexia. So I wanted people to understand that there are different symptoms for each. Even now there are scenes with Rachel McKenna that revolve around food that are really funny. Do you ever see her eating? No. ... We just had to spell it out because so many young kids just see her and think, 'Oh look, she's not hungry at this time of the morning and she's not eating, so why should I?" Another high-profile storyline saw Rachel discover she had chlamydia and a storyline where hairdressers found nit's in her hair. Bloomfield did not wish for Rachel to be seen as a role model, citing her anger, "she resorts to some really bad excuses for getting angry." Storylines surrounding Rachel's reluctance to accept her maternal nature were often dealt with, Bloomfield explained, "I know she likes children, but ... she'll disguise it with a sarcastic remark. You would only see it when she's alone with the child." In 2009 Rachel returned with what Bloomfield described as an "anti-children" sentiment but following her relationship with Chris, accepted his sons into her life. By 2014, Rachel was referred to as effectively being Harry Warner's (Reid Walker) mother.

A 2001 storyline that saw Jack Hewitt (Manu Bennett) kidnap Rachel, was a feature on mental illness. Jack had bipolar disorder and stopped taking his medication when Rachel dumped him. The resulting episodes saw Jack kidnap Rachel, attempt to murder Chris Warner (Michael Galvin), try to force Rachel to marry him and end up committing suicide. The storyline was met with a hugely negative reception due to its negative stereotyping of those suffering mental illnesses, however a complaint was dismissed by the Broadcasting Standards Authority due to its investigation into the issue. It discovered that the erratic behaviour shown by Jack was not inconsistent with the reality of a person with bipolar disorder who had failed to take medication. A storyline that was set to air in 2002, was to see Rachel discover she was pregnant and have a termination. Though Shortland Street had featured several abortion storylines before, they had not been well received. The 1995 storyline that saw the middle aged Jenny Harrison (Maggie Harper) terminate her child was met with clouds of controversy and many complaints to the Broadcasting Standards Authority. As such, the storyline was reworked in that Rachel had a Tubal ligation instead of an abortion. Nonetheless, Bloomfield was still shocked with the storyline and it led to her 2002 resignation. In 2011 Rachel featured in a storyline where she illegally smacked her partner Chris' son Harry. Rachel was an inexperienced parent and as such, Bloomfield had to forget her own maternal nature, "As a mum, my responses are now automatic. So when I was playing Rachel in this role, I tried to forget about what now comes naturally as a parent ... Rachel eventually breaks, and that's when she smacks him. It all happens pretty quickly and she immediately realises she has crossed a line." Bloomfield was uneasy filming the storyline, "It felt really inappropriate – even filming the scene! But Reid did a fantastic job. He really pulled out all his menace to play that part." Rachel's ethical issues again gained prominence in 2013 with Rachel being the centre of a health storyline. After stress in both her professional and private life, Rachel nearly resorted back to alcohol but was struck by a major panic attack. Later in the year, Rachel started up a charity for homeless people alongside Henry Lee (Peter Huang). In both 2013 and 2014, Rachel was involved in storylines that saw her fight a smoking habit. Rachel was also involved in a 2014 storyline that saw her use an elixir similar to botox. Rachel featured in another addiction storyline in 2016 when she became reliant on Codeine medication. Bloomfield was surprised that the show was covering addiction with Rachel again but believed it made sense as she, "supposed in a way they have shifted her addiction from alcohol to codeine."

=== Alcoholism ===
A storyline that Rachel was often involved with was her alcoholism, Bloomfield enjoyed acting out the illness, "I loved my drinking days and being unstable because there was so much opportunity as an actor to spin out of control, be tortured, then build yourself up again." Rachel was first shown to have an alcohol problem in the late nineties, which Bloomfield thought added to Rachel's positive attitude, "she loosened up and slept with the wrong boy and if anything, she probably laughed more." The storyline proved to affect Bloomfield in her own personal life, "For that you have to bring yourself to your lowest ebb. I used to come home and cry before I went to sleep. Then I'd think, 'Hang on. I have the best life – I am a working actor, I have good friends, I own a home whats wrong with me?" Following words from her father Michael (Paul Gittins), whom also was an alcoholic, Rachel stayed off alcohol until a 2002 storyline saw work and relationship issues lead her to return to drinking. Bloomfield noticed a different dynamic in her portrayal than the previous storyline, "this time it hasn't been much fun because she's older and she's hiding it from everybody. It's kind of yucky, and she has the potential to lose her job, her friends, and partner." Whilst at the peak of her alcoholism, Rachel crashed her car whilst drink driving, causing an explosion that she narrowly survived. She gave up drinking in 2003, but upon returning 6 years later, Rachel was again back on alcohol. The show's producer at the time told Bloomfield after the storylines conclusion that the show wouldn't be repeating the alcoholic relapse story again. Bloomfield believed that this was "probably quite good" but did enjoy playing a character with flaws. After again going clean, Rachel nearly resorted back to drinking in early 2013 after suffering from stress in her professional life, but restrained herself. When Bloomfield quit the role in 2016, producers decided to have Rachel undergo a relapse. Bloomfield wanted Rachel to leave with a happy ending but understood "they had to leave it in a certain way and create a situation where Michael (Chris Warner) wouldn't follow her. So for me as I started to read it, I was like 'oh I'm bummed'." Rachel ended up leaving Ferndale to recover by herself, with most of the characters "hating her."

=== Nick Harrison ===
Upon her introduction 8 months into the soap operas airing, Rachel was paired as a friend of established character – Nick Harrison (Karl Burnett). The partnership between the two teenage characters worked so effectively due to the solid friendship that occurred between the two actors when Bloomfield joined the show, "When I started on Shortland Street we had that common bond so we could sit down and say, 'You went to Massey' .... I was 19, but I was hugely in awe of everyone. I was so scared when I started Shortland Street, so I just watched Karl. He was kind of kooky and uncool but I learned a lot of professional etiquette from him .... I don't know what happened, but over the past five and a half years we just got a lot closer and closer. I guess that's what having a friend is like. We're always supportive of each other. He's a darling." Storylines between the two characters were often comical, including Bloomfield's highlight where Nick chained himself to a boat during a race, whilst Rachel dressed up as a mermaid and nearly drowned. Rachel was always intended to be a love interest for established character, Stuart Neilson (Martin Henderson), but Nick developed a one time crush on her upon her arrival that for the most part, went forever unrequited. Rachel's parents were in the middle of a separation at the time Nick met her and as such she ended up leaning on him for support. Bloomfield explained that Rachel, "saw a side to Nick she'd never seen before."

In 1995 Rachel married best friend and comical character, Nick Harrison (Karl Burnett) in a protest on student allowance. The storyline not only advanced the plot, but also depicted current events of the time.

In 1995 a highly topical storyline went underway between the two characters when they married in a ceremony that would benefit them a larger student allowance for tertiary education. Not only did the storyline break up the romance storyline between Nick and Rachel's cousin Waverley (Claire Chitham), but it was also a reflection on current events of the time. Producers used the wedding tactically to draw in viewers, releasing much of the storyline to a news outlet prior to the storyline unfolding so that viewers would commit beforehand to watch it. The storyline reportedly struck a chord with students despite the marriage being solely for convenience. As the wedding storyline aired, Bloomfield noted the special bond between the two characters, "With what we're doing now, the two of us are really close. So it just shows that no matter what kind of break there is between seeing each other, Rachel and Nick will always be there for each other". Throughout the mid to late nineties, the characters of Rachel, Nick, Fergus Kearney, and Minnie Crozier often shared scenes together due to their age and installed the soap archetype of "hip, young things". This further developed the relationship between the two characters. In 1998 Bloomfield was shocked to discover an upcoming storyline would see her character fall in love with Nick. She soon learned that it was all part of a comical storyline for the two, "The script said, 'She's so in love with Nick, she wants this...' and I am like, 'No, calm down, it will be a joke.' The next minute Karl walked in the room and every- one just cracked up laughing. I felt so embarrassed. Then I went back and read the scenes before it and saw that Rachel had been struck by lightning." She described the lightning storyline as "something from Days of Our Lives – just without the amnesia!"

Bloomfield was embarrassed and nervous throughout the kissing scenes and Burnett agreed with her behaviour, "It was really strange. It would have been like me kissing my sister which is really, gross. It was just really weird being that close to each other. I hope we don't ever have to do it again." Bloomfield believed the lightning bolt brought out a personality change in Rachel. "She doesn't want to sit down and have an intelligent conversation with Nick, she wants to jump into bed with him." The storyline culminated in Nick recording himself farting and eating onions in an attempt to rid Rachel's attraction, though all failed and he eventually decided to sleep with her. However, as they about to consummate the relationship, Rachel was shocked by the bedside light and returned to normal. That year Rachel accepted a new job in the clinic that would see the character share less screentime with Nick, Bloomfield explained the situation, "I'm not acting all the time with Karl now, which I miss, but which is also quite good for me." Following the death of Nick's partner Angela Weaver (Katherine Hubbard) in 2001, a returned Rachel supported him and looked after his young son. The following year, Rachel served as Nick's best man for his wedding to her cousin – Waverley. In 2010, 5 years after the high-profile axing of the Harrison family, Bloomfield jokingly suggested bringing back Burnett to the soap if the producers could afford it.

=== Relationship with Chris ===
Rachel and "Dr Love" (Chris Warner (Michael Galvin), the show's longest running character) began a relationship in 2002 which would see the two labelled "Shortland Street's golden couple" and would continue in a "will they, won't they" scenario for more than 10 years. Out of all of Chris' love interests, Rachel has been referred to as "the love of his life." Bloomfield and Galvin established a friendship throughout working together, with Bloomfield stating, "We're like two old people who have known each other forever. We're like a pair of slippers. We're so comfortable in each other's company." The onscreen couple was believed by Bloomfield to be an accurate depiction of a real life couple, "I really love ... this. We're speaking a true language and we're telling a story that I think lots of people will look at and be able to relate to." Bloomfield and Galvin were also briefly romantically involved in real life. Rachel was originally the daughter of Chris' boss, Michael McKenna (Paul Gittins); but throughout the nineties the two characters shared very little scenes together. When both characters returned after hiatus' in 2000 and 2001, an onscreen partnership was established between the two. Rachel developed a crush on the doctor, but Galvin was unsure of the potential relationship, "Who knows? .... If it did happen, it wouldn't matter that we are friends. Passion for the cameras is all part of the job, and it's definitely not like the real thing." Rachel exposed Chris' fiancée Samara (Jodie Rimmer) as a fraud and at first Chris despised her. The two participated in a pantomime play and after the two kissed on stage, Chris decided he too was in love with Rachel. However whilst Rachel accessed her feelings overseas, Chris began to sleep with nurse Toni Thompson (Laura Hill). Upon return Rachel instantly began to date the manic Jack (Manu Bennett). Jack ended up kidnapping Rachel but Chris saved her and the two started a relationship. However, with the birth of Chris' son from his affair with Toni, and Rachel's refusal to be a mother, the relationship started to deteriorate and Rachel turned to the bottle. By late 2002, the relationship was described by Bloomfield as, "shaky". As Rachel's alcoholism worsened, Chris grew close to Donna (Stephanie Tauevihi), something Bloomfield believed Rachel was ignorant to, "Rachel trusts Donna completely – and with good reason. She knows that Donna would never do anything to hurt her. What Rachel doesn't realise is that her relationship with Chris is in serious trouble. As she and Chris grow apart, despite their bets intentions, Donna and Chris become closer." As the year came to a close, Chris ended his relationship with the out-of-control Rachel. He got together with Donna and an extremely drunk Rachel tried to ring him while driving, resulting in a near fatal car crash. Rachel fled Ferndale, embarrassed and alone. Bloomfield admitted that though the relationship was over, Rachel was still feeling unrequited love. In 2006, Galvin called for the return of Rachel as the couple had "unfinished business" and named her as possibly Chris' most suitable match. Rachel returned in 2007 with the same feelings for Chris and the two slept together before she left. Rachel returned in 2009 on business reasons, but it was clear to the audience and to the on-screen characters, that her true plan was to win Chris back. Bloomfield stated, "Rachel arrives back in Ferndale on a mission to win back Chris Warner. Chris and her share a lot of history, and she's decided that it's time they get back together once and for all" and admitted that Chris was "the one that got away".

Steven Zanoski acknowledged that Rachel was willing to move on after Chris, but stated that there were unresolved feelings between the ex lovers. Rachel knew Chris still had feelings for her, with Bloomfield stating, "Rachel is determined to get Chris back and she's willing to go to any length to make it happen. She feels it's only a matter of time become he succumbs ... Rachel can sense Chris feels something for her". Peter Mochrie admitted that his character's (Callum McKay) relationship with Rachel was mainly a fill-in for Chris, stating: "In the back of his mind, Chris is always going to be the love of Rachel's life and he's trying to put a good spin on that and do as much as he can. Callum's the sort of guy that will cook and bring flowers and do romantic stuff for her. But who knows? I have a sneaking feeling Chris will be back... but we'll see." Zanoski thought it was best Rachel and Chris never got together permanently, but nonetheless, in June 2010 Chris realised he was still in love with Rachel and she too reaccessed her feelings. Bloomfield offered an explanation as to why the two characters keep going back to each other, saying: "They are gluttons for punishment. They have a huge history. Chris tried to help Rachel with her alcoholism years ago. They have just always been attracted to each other." The love triangle between Rachel, Chris and Callum saw Bloomfield explain the storyline, stating: "She's set herself up with a guy that's great; that offers her a lot of things, that to a lot of women would be wonderful, but he's not the love of her life and she has the love of her life, kinda in the next room." The two finally got together as 2010 ended but whilst Rachel broke it off with Callum, all three got stuck in a devastating explosion. Rachel, Chris and Callum clashed when hospital management came into talks, with Chris suggesting Rachel replace Callum as permanent CEO despite him recovering from serious burns. Rachel declined however, feeling guilty for her treatment of Callum. Moving in with Chris and becoming a surrogate mother to his children, Rachel became the centre of a highly topical storyline when she illegally physically punished Chris' son Harry (Reid Walker). The two's romance became a pivotal point of the 2011 cliffhanger, with the two playing happy families, Rachel was oblivious to the fact Gabrielle Jacobs (Virginie Le Brun) had announced her love to Chris. Gabrielle and Chris started an affair as the year ended. Rachel and Chris broke up but reunited in 2012 for the show's 20th anniversary, however Galvin hinted the worst of their relationship was yet to come, saying; "It gets very rocky. And just when you think it's hit rock bottom it gets much, much worse."

Chris was arrested for murder but eventually released, and the relationship suffered, with Bloomfield explaining: "Rachel feels confused because she naively assumed everything would go back to normal post prison. And even though she knows it can't, it's her way of coping ... It's more about not recognizing Chris because he's changed and that scares her." Following Chris' brain injury in 2013, the couple were at odds following an apparent personality change in Chris, Bloomfield explained, "Rachel realises she has to start to get on board with Chris's new way of thinking. But everything he is doing is completely the opposite of what he'd usually do. Rachel finds it really hard to relate to this new Chris ... Rachel thinks it's fine for Chris to let his new ideas loose at home and she needs to accept that." Chris suggested the couple have a baby, but according to Bloomfield, Rachel thought it was, "a stupid idea. She can't have children and she doesn't want them. She had a terrible upbringing and isn't prepared to risk raising a child." Instead Chris proposed to Rachel to which she declined, Bloomfield believed the two could work it out, "I think love will prevail for the pair of them, but Rachel's still going to be herself. She's not going to change for him. She's making a choice to love him regardless of how's he's changed." However, following a talk from Grace Kwan (Lynette Forday), Rachel herself proposed to Chris, to which he accepted. Only moments later, a bomb rigged by Josh Gallagher (Chris Tempest) under the influence of his hero syndrome, exploded, collapsing the deck underneath the couple and leaving their fate ambiguous as the season ended. The two characters survived the cliffhanger but Galvin noted the road to marriage was going to be "problematic" as, "Rachel's a bit contemptuous of the idea of marriage, but .... Chris is fully into that sentimental idea of getting it put in writing". Bloomfield was surprised at the story liners decision to marry Rachel and Chris due to her previous resignation from the show as a result of Rachel's no marriage sentiment, but was told that Rachel would go along with the marriage, "to be with him and that means going along with what he wants." Both Galvin and Bloomfield believed the intention of the marriage was to secure a long running relationship on the show and Bloomfield believed if they were to break up, it would be a "bad pay-off" to fans. The wedding episode aired in February 2014 with Harry serving as Chris' best man and Harper (Ria Vandervis) acting as Rachel's bridesmaid. Bloomfield enjoyed the way Rachel was engaged in the storyline, "The whole premise of this storyline is that Rachel has never wanted to be a bride, never needed or wanted to get married. So when she finally concedes, she's the anti-bride. She goes 'I'm not wearing white, I'm not doing this or that." Galvin believed the wedding episode dealt with very little drama as producers wanted one marriage that was, "happy". Galvin also believed Chris and Rachel's marriage was Chris' most believable, due to his and Bloomfields long lasting friendship. In late 2014 the couple broke up following the revelation Chris knew his baby daughter had not miscarried. Rachel began an affair with Garrett Whitley (Spencer Falls) but Galvin believed Chris was determined to win her back, "He has decided that Rachel is the great love of his life and, for that reason he .... is convinced if he just preserves for long enough she will come to her senses and fall into his arms."

Bloomfield quit the role in 2016 and producers had to write an exit storyline where Chris would not leave with her whilst not killing her off, so that she could return in the future. Chris began to suspect Rachel was addicted to codeine but Bloomfield believed Chris purposely turned a blind eye, "Chris doesn't want to acknowledge his wife has issues. They've been through so much and everything has taken its toll. They haven't acknowledged each other as individuals and gone, 'I really love you, flaws included'." Following her codeine addiction, Rachel relapsed as a result of a manipulative Glenn Rickman (Will Wallace). She was stood down from CEO and drunkenly ruined Lucy's (Grace Palmer) wedding, before deciding to leave Ferndale alone to recover. Galvin believed that Rachel, "was what he built his life around and with her gone, he just can't see a future. He's at real crisis point." He thought that Chris was betrayed that "Rachel couldn't confide in him."

Galvin referred to Rachel as "Chris' Great Love" and "the one who got away" and said of her return in 2026 that "This time is the time." The automatic attraction upon Rachel's return was due to a good balance Galvin believed, "the two characters react against each other in a really good way ... They're both high achievers, but have slightly different outlooks on life and slightly different engines driving them. They're a good mix of a lot of things in common and some really significant things that aren't that cause friction ... it just keeps generating drama." Bloomfield appreciated this as, "They've gone through their struggles so you do find yourself rooting for them."

== Storylines ==
Rachel arrives in early 1993 and forces her father Michael (Paul Gittins) to dump his young girlfriend. She becomes besotted by Stuart Neilson (Martin Henderson) and uses a smitten Nick Harrison (Karl Burnett) to get closer to Stuart. She develops bulimia and breaks up with Stuart when she learns that he had sex with her mother Alex (Liddy Holloway). Rachel starts dating Tim Cunningham (Richard Vette) and befriends the pregnant Ramona (Ashleigh Seagar), however a spiteful Charlotte (Nicola Cliff) reveals Tim is the father of Ramona's baby and Rachel breaks up with him. The following year, Rachel dates Manny Atutahi (Albert Belz) but breaks up with him for Rangi Heremaia (Blair Strang) and also marries Nick in a protest on student loans. She studies and becomes a social worker.

Her romance with Rangi does not last and Rachel is presented the local bar "Kennedys" as a 21st present from her mother. However running the new and improved "R Bar" sees Rachel turn from her poor relationship to drinking and she nearly kills Rangi with car fumes whilst passed out drunk. Her alcoholism causes Rachel to almost die in a car crash. Michael returns and helps Rachel overcome her addiction and she ends up getting hit by lightning. The lightning causes her to become temporarily infatuated with Nick with the two nearly having sex. Rachel sells the bar and accepts a position as Administration Manager of the clinic. She dates Frank (Christopher Hobbs) but dumps him for Daniel Buchanan (Jack Campbell). She breaks up with him and dates Frank again before she decides to leave for America. Whilst overseas, she marries Daniel. She returns two years later for her cousin Waverley's (Claire Chitham) wedding and gets involved with Frank once again before he leaves for Nepal.

After deciding to stay in Ferndale permanently, Rachel continues her job as Administration/HR Manager and ended up breaking up with Frank when Daniel returns. However, she soon realises she wants a divorce and briefly dates Matt McAllister (Roy Snow). She develops a crush on Chris (Michael Galvin) but takes up with Jack (Manu Bennett), who kidnaps her and tries to marry her. Chris saves her and the two start a relationship. Rachel became 2IC of the hospital but again turns to alcohol and has a brief flirtation with Zac (Mike Edward) before she nearly dies in an explosion. After she returns from rehab, Chris breaks up with her to be with Donna (Stephanie Tauevihi). She uses her connections with Marj Brasch (Elizabeth McRae) to get a job in the government. She returns in 2007 to audit the hospital and it turns out she was engaged. Rachel has sex with Chris and unsuccessfully pleads with him to love her before leaving.

Rachel returns in October 2009 to audit the hospital once again. Declined by Chris for a relationship, Rachel again begins drinking and refuses help from estranged husband Jeremy (Eryn Wilson). Passed out at the Christmas party, Kieran Mitchell (Adam Rickitt) uses her state to his advantage and frames her for the hit and run death of Morgan Braithwaite (Bonnie Soper). Distraught, Rachel gives up drinking and dates Callum McKay (Peter Mochrie) and works with him by becoming 2IC of the hospital once again. However Rachel is proven innocent and Chris announces his love for her, and the two finally get together. Rachel struggles to cope with family life while Chris is out of town and has trouble keeping control of his son Harry (Reid Walker), eventually losing her cool and smacking him, despite it being illegal in New Zealand. The couple briefly breaks up when Chris cheats on Rachel but she later stands by him when he is wrongly accused of murder. That year, Rachel is awarded the position of CEO of the hospital, a role her father had held 17 years beforehand.

Rachel begins having severe anxiety attacks following a political undermining at the hospital and the stress of fostering Jared Afeaki (Beulah Koale) with Chris. Her subsequent weak mindset sees her undermined by Seth Packhurst (Toby Leach), eventually losing her job to him. Rachel assumes many different jobs before becoming a DHB representative. Her relationship with Chris hits the rocks when he suggests they have a child, but the two reconcile and get engaged. Though struggling with Chris' decision to have a child with Grace Kwan (Lynette Forday), the couple finally marry and Rachel returns to her role as CEO of the hospital. Following the revelation that Grace and Chris had faked a miscarriage together, the married couple separate and Rachel has a brief fling with Garrett Whitley (Spencer Falls). However, Rachel soon realises she is still in love with Chris and the two reconcile and purchase a new house together.

The arrival of Glenn Rickman (Will Wallace), Rachel's former flame during her alcoholic days, causes strain on Rachel and she began to take codeine, which becomes an addiction. Glenn drugs Rachel and she briefly relapses on alcohol and nearly drowns. Strung out and on heavy watch by her family, Rachel makes several major organisational mistakes at the hospital and she is stood down. She relapses again and ruins Lucy's (Grace Palmer) wedding, and she then decides to leave Ferndale to get better. She rejects Chris' offer to go with her and departs alone, much to Chris and Harry's dismay. The following year at Chris' 50th birthday, Nick accidentally reveals that Rachel has entered into a new relationship. In 2020, Rachel calls Chris to send her condolences when his son Phoenix Warner (Geordie Holibar) dies.

== Reception ==
In 2002 Bloomfield was voted "Best Actress" in the TV Guide Reader's Poll. Rachel has been labelled "Shortland Street's sexiest ever women" and "popular". She had also adorned the title, "Shortland Street's best-loved bitch". By the 20th anniversary of her first appearance in 2013, Rachel had become one of the shows longest running characters. Portraying Rachel reportedly made Angela Bloomfield a household name. The New Zealand Woman's Day magazine listed Rachel as the 3rd best character of the soap's first 25 years. In the mid nineties, Rachel was aged in the same core demographic of the show's primary watching audience. Because of this, Bloomfield found audiences relating well to her, "I had too many people ringing me up when I was doing the eating disorders not to become aware of the influence Rachel has ... I'm always getting people saying, "I really like your character' and then I stand back and look at them and they really are the epitome of Rachel. Sometimes I find it really sad because they're too scared to develop who they really are." Bloomfield thought the scene where Rachel was hit by lightning was the most enjoyed scene by fans as it was "exciting". Rachel's return in 2001 was extremely well received, this was due to it occurring at a time when the show was under immense change and many were relieved that a character from the soaps roots was bringing the show to its glory days. The return was described as a "good move" considering her overwhelming popularity in the nineties. The storyline that saw Jack (Manu Bennett) kidnap Rachel after having a relapse in his bipolar disorder saw huge complaints at the apparent stereotyping of the illness. After crashing her car in the 2002 Christmas cliffhanger, a poll was taken to see what viewers wanted to happen to Rachel. 100% of the voters hoped Rachel would survive and wreak revenge on her cheating boyfriend, Chris Warner. Upon hearing of Rachel's 2009 return, Charlotte Cowan of Entertainment Fix hoped she would provide an adequate returnee on the soap after the disappointing returns of Hone Ropata (Temuera Morrison) and Justine Jones (Lucy Wigmore). Virginie Le Brun (Gabrielle Jacobs) praised Bloomfield's portrayal of Rachel, stating, "everything she does is very truthful. I really love the way she works." The departure of Rachel in 2016 alongside several other characters, saw what journalist Duncan Grieve described as a "disappointing" era of the show, where it entered a style of "regularity" and lacked "long-running and well-acted" characters and became a "blur".

The character of Rachel and her story lines have been labelled "spectacular", and iconic, winning Bloomfield numerous fan awards. The storyline where Rachel got nits was called "silly" but received acclaim for its coverage of modern-day problems and skill of the writers. It was later named as one of the most iconic storylines to feature on the soap. The 1995 storylines that saw Rachel marry Nick and nearly kill Rangi whilst drunk, were voted by fans as two of the shows most iconic moments. Her catfight with Samara in 2001 has been remembered as a hugely iconic scene. In 2002 she was listed as the 9th best character to ever feature on the soap. In 2007, Rachel was the character fans wanted to return the most in the Throng Shortland Street fan awards. Rachel's 2009 return was praised, winning runner up for "Best thing to happen in 2009" in the Throng Shortland Street Fan Awards. However, due to the character's antagonistic characterisation, she was voted runner up for "Character you'd most like to get rid of". Her 2009 return was named as the second best ever character return in the soap, in a 2013 list collated by the Shortland Street website. In 2010 her relationships were criticised, winning runner up for "Worst Couple" for her relationship with Callum, while her relationship with Chris was also criticised, being labelled "boring" by one fan. In 2012, the character was named as one of the standout characters of the show's first 20 years. In the Ferndale Talk Best of 2013 awards, Rachel was voted the third favourite character by fans and Bloomfield was voted, "Favourite Actress". Rachel and Chris were also runner up for "Favourite Couple", with their decision to have a child together getting runner up for "Most Shocking Plot Twist". Episodes airing in May 2013 that saw Rachel and Chris break up saw the show receive some of its highest ratings recorded. Rachel's departure in 2016 saw a large response on social media with the actress's Twitter being "flooded" with messages. Bloomfield found her final storyline "depressing" but believed it "satisfied" her acting.

The 2026 return of Rachel was described as "quietly thrilling" by TV Guide editor Frances Morton, noting, "It isn't just a nostalgic treat for long-time fans ... Rachel's re-emergence taps into that collective memory. In an era of endless choice, the appeal of local soaps lies in their reliability and relevance. Welcome back."
