= Harry Warner (Shortland Street) =

- Shortland Street character
- Xander Manktelow as Harry Thompson (2024)
- Portrayed by: Joshua Thompson (2002); Callum Campbell Ross (2002–2006); Henry Williams (2006–2009); Reid Walker (2009–18); Xander Manktelow (2023–24, 2026)
- Duration: 2002–18, 2023–24, 2026
- First appearance: 23 May 2002
- Last appearance: 17 November 2026
- Introduced by: Harriet Crampton (2002); Maxine Fleming (2018); Oliver Driver (2023–2026)
- Reid Walker as Harry Warner (2017)
In-universe information
- Father: Chris Warner
- Mother: Toni Thompson
- Brothers: James Warner
- Half-brothers: Frank Warner; Finn Warner; Phoenix Raynor
- Half-sisters: Sass Warner; Trinity Kwan
- Wife: Zhilan Li (2021—)
- Sons: Xun Warner
- Grandfathers: Sir Bruce Warner; Anthony Thompson
- Grandmothers: Margot, Lady Warner; Ngaire Thompson
- Uncles: Guy Warner; Dominic Thompson
- Aunts: Amanda Warner
- Nieces: Amelie Warner
- First cousins: Tuesday Warner; Kelly Piper (possibly)
- Other relatives: Isaac Worthington; Joseph Worthington

Harry Warner (previously Thompson and Thompson-Warner) is a fictional character on the New Zealand soap opera Shortland Street who first appeared onscreen in May 2002. Being born on screen during the show's 10th anniversary, Harry has been portrayed by several child actors and by Xander Manktelow from 2023.

== Creation and casting ==
In 2001 the shows producers decided to undergo a story that saw Toni Thompson (Laura Hill) give birth prematurely during the soap operas 10th anniversary. After the initial birth scenes, Callum Campbell-Ross was cast in the role due his small size resembling that of a premature baby and due to his family living close to the studio where the soap was filmed. It was decided the role of Harry would be recast in 2006 after Directors struggled to convince 3 year old Campbell-Ross to film "naughty boy" scenes where he broke a sandcastle. Henry Williams had auditioned for the character of a child patient, but was contacted to see whether he would be interested in playing Harry. In 2009 producers made the decision to recast the role so as to make way for new story directions and characterisation. The pitch was brought up during a meeting with directors and was originally met with hesitation. Reid Walker had previously auditioned for several different roles over several years and had never been called back. In 2009 he was contacted to audition for the recast of Harry. Prior to this, Walker had considered giving up on his acting dream but within one audition, he won the role. He debuted in September 2009 at the age of 9. During his first few years Walker was a minor member of cast, filming 2 scenes a week, but by 2014 he was a "senior" member and was filming 15 as well as having his own storylines. After having appeared on the show for over 8 years, Walker departed the show as a regular cast member to attend university. He continued to make guest appearances throughout 2017 and 2018.

In 2023 Shortland Street underwent a "new-era" of the show with 6 new characters arriving to "mix things up" as part of a medical trainee storyline. Producers had been intending to reintroduce Harry and saw this storyline as an opportunity to do so. The character was not within the accurate age-range to be a doctor, but this was creatively altered with Producer Oliver Driver believing, "we probably should have waited another four years. But we didn’t want to". Harry returned and was recast with Xander Manktelow assuming the role. Manktelow described portraying the adult Harry as, "really special" and "a lot of fun to be thrown into this world and have the ability to play with the history and drama around the Warner name.” Manktelow wanted to "put my own spin on the character" whilst giving Harry's history "justice". The character departed in March 2024. Manktelow reprised his role for a cameo in the 2024 Christmas cliffhanger, alongside several members of his on-screen family to conclude his storyline.

== Storylines ==
In 2001 Toni Thompson (Laura Hill) fell pregnant but it was not clear who the father was as she had been sleeping with both Adam Heywood (Leighton Cardno) and Chris Warner (Michael Galvin). She gave birth several months prematurely in May 2002 and it was not until Rachel McKenna (Angela Bloomfield) had the babies DNA tested that Chris was revealed as the father. In 2003 Harry went missing and it was soon revealed he had been kidnapped by a mentally unstable Donna Heka (Stephanie Tauevihi). The following year he was kidnapped again, this time by Toni's former flame, Logan King (Peter Muller). In 2004 Harry and Toni were kidnapped by Toni's deranged brother Dominic (Shane Cortese) in an attempt to kill Chris. Harry caused trouble for Chris and Toni the following year, when his tantrums climaxed in him biting Huia Samuels (Nicola Kawana) hand. Toni fled Ferndale in 2007 and took Harry with her but upon their return, the family scraped death in a dramatic car crash. Harry was devastated months later when Toni died and struggled to come to terms with Chris' succession of girlfriends – going so far as to force him to break up with Brooke Freeman (Beth Allen). In 2010 Harry struggled to cope with the revelation he had a brother, Phoenix (Geordie Holibar) but grew to love him. He clashed with Chris' girlfriend Rachel McKenna and pressed charges when she lightly slapped him. During Halloween 2013, Harry stopped breathing and lost his heart beat for 45 minutes after drinking a potion made of several garden weeds, including foxglove. However, after Chris used his chief executive officer position at the hospital to register prolonged CPR, Harry survived without brain damage. In early 2015 Harry met Pixie Hannah (Thomasin McKenzie) and after initial clashes, the two began to date. However Pixie was diagnosed with bone cancer and Harry supported her through the following treatment but was devastated when she succumbed to pneumonia shortly after the two had confessed their love.

Harry began to date Lily Flores (Zoe Fong) but landed in huge trouble when Chris caught him sending sexual images. The relationship became sexual but he was betrayed when she left him for another man. Upset at his loss and ready for a change, Harry decided to finish his schooling in Japan, before transferring to Shanghai. Harry returned months later, furious with Chris for hiding his cancer diagnosis, and having accidentally impregnated his homestay sister Zhilan Li (Bridget Wong). After witnessing Chris payoff his daughter in law Mindy Connelly (Catriona Toop), he disowned him and turned to half-brother Finn (Lukas Whiting) for finances before returning to China. He briefly returned for Finn's wedding, showing signs of prenatal depression. In late-2018 Harry returned to Ferndale with his baby son Xun Warner having escaped China due to issues in his relationship. Zhilan's father arrived and threatened Harry, resulting in Chris attempting to seek custody of Xun to ensure his safety. Ultimately Harry realised his mistake and opted to return to China.

Harry returned to Ferndale in 2023 as a new surgical intern competing against several others for a top placement at the hospital much to Chris' surprise. Having married Zhilan and separated, Harry frustrated fellow intern Stella Reihana (Tatum Warren-Ngata) with his womanising ways, before the two started a relationship. The two both won their placements but the romance ended when Stella re-connected with her ex. It soon became apparent Harry was hiding something from his past in China and became intensely jealous when Stella started seeing Rahu Parata (Zak Martin). When his childhood rival Max Lynch (Jack Powers) confronted him with this leading to a confrontation, Harry allowed him to fall to his death and stole the evidence. Sabotaging Rahu at work in an attempt to discredit him including by forcing an overdose on a patient, Harry began to struggle with his past when Chris uncovered a strained relationship with Zhilan and Xun from drink-driving in China. This culminated in Rahu discovering that Harry had never completed his medical degree, only to be stabbed repeatedly by a violent patient; with Harry not stepping in to save him. Taking charge of the surgery to save his life, Harry purposely sabotaged it to allow Rahu to die on the surgical table; taking his secret with him and leaving Stella single.

Eventually manipulating Stella into re-entering a romance, she soon started to suspect Harry of murder after discovering Max's missing phone in his bedroom. Piecing together the facts, she accused Harry of purposely killing Rahu - leading to Police uncovering his false work history. However Harry had already escaped with help from Chris, shortly after confessing to Rahu's murder and assaulting Stella. Police later retrieved Max's phone, with video evidence of Harry having purposely pushed him off the balcony. However, they had also discovered he had fled on a fake passport to Asia, making an arrest difficult. With the help of son Frank, Chris spent the rest of the year in a depressive state trying to locate Harry at various overseas destinations before he was retrieved back to New Zealand on a private jet in December. Admitting his crimes but reluctant to go to jail, Harry attacked Chris before finally being turned over to authorities. In 2025, Chris revealed that Harry had been sentenced to 15 years in prison.

== Character development ==
Following the death of Harry's mother Toni Warner (Laura Hill), Hill hoped that the development of the character would be influenced, "It would be nice to think there would be floods of tears for months on end but that's not going to happen, is it? I imagine Chris Warner will find someone to fill the empty bed pretty dam quick going on from past form. I think Harry will be sadder for longer. I hope so." The casting of Reid Walker in the role of Harry saw the character develop from a "wayward child" to a "rebellious pre-teen". In 2011 Harry was featured in a storyline that saw his fathers girlfriend, Rachel McKenna (Angela Bloomfield) illegally discipline him when she smacked him. Rachel was an inexperienced parent and as such, Bloomfield had to forget her own maternal nature, "As a mum, my responses are now automatic. So when I was playing Rachel in this role, I tried to forget about what now comes naturally as a parent ... Rachel eventually breaks, and that's when she smacks him. It all happens pretty quickly and she immediately realises she has crossed a line." Bloomfield was uneasy filming the storyline, "It felt really inappropriate – even filming the scene!" During filming, Walker wore cushions in his pants so that Bloomfield would not be physically hitting him.

In 2014 when the character was entering his teenage years, Harry started to move away from his recurring manner and take up his own storylines. Walker enjoyed the transition, "It's been nice to move on from minor parts in plotlines to actual stuff that concerns my character ... I've enjoyed the journey. I look forward to wherever the writers take me next." The storyline dealt with his discomfort with Chris after he lied about fathering a daughter, Trinity Kwan (Maya Ruriko Doura).

=== 'Dick pic' storyline ===
Whilst discussing storylines for Harry in 2017, producer Maxine Fleming encouraged writers to storyline a coming of age plot where he lost his virginity. It was decided to incorporate in sexting so as to appear "contemporary". Galvin was pleased to be given the storyline, "I couldn't wait. It was fantastic. We live for these kinds of things. I was so excited about the scene, when it came to do it I didn't want to ruin it." The storyline unfolded with Harry photographing his genitalia for his girlfriend Lily only for it to be synced with the family tablet and for Chris to find it. The cliffhanger of the episode then revolved around Chris confronting Harry with the line "Please tell me that is not your penis!" Due to the hilarity of the dialogue, the filming of the scene took 3 takes. Fleming explained the decision to include the 'dick pic', "It is a comedy story, but like all good comedy there's a truth at the core of it, and it is social commentary, that story. Many teens are doing stuff like this, and many parents are worried about it." The cliffhanger went viral and Fleming expressed apologies to Galvin for the dialogue, "I think Michael now is going to have that line shouted at him across the street. ... So I'm sorry about that Michael!"

=== Villain Arc ===
The return of Harry after 5 years in 2023 saw a new portrayal of the character; he was recast to be played by Xander Manktelow, and revealed to have become a doctor. Manktelow played Harry as "quite misunderstood by everyone ... I think you’ll see that he’s really got quite a big heart and there’s a lot more to him than what he chooses to show people." When Harry's childhood rival Max Lynch (Jack Powers) is discovered to have fallen to his death, several characters come under suspicion, before viewers learned Harry was the likely culprit after Max threatened to expose him as a fraud. It was soon revealed on-screen that Harry had faked his surgical qualifications, with Max having discovered this shortly before his death. Manktelow acknowledged the villainy consistent in the Warner family but believed Harry, "definitely might stand on his own in that group." Harry's colleague Rahu Parata (Zak Martin) soon discovered the truth but after being attacked by a drug-addict, was murdered on the surgical table by Harry to cover his crimes, leading to the shows Christmas cliffhanger. Producer Oliver Driver thought the storyline was one "that viewers love." He predicted that, "Some are going to be annoyed, some will be upset and some are going to be happy, some will be thrilled and some will be disgusted and say ‘I’m never watching again’ but some of them are going to go, ‘Oh my god, it’s so good’".

== Reception ==
Harry has been referred to as the, "most annoying character on the show." Walker himself admitted Harry was an annoying character, but stressed that he was not much like his part. Co-star Angela Bloomfield (Rachel McKenna) praised Walker for his acting during the 2011 illegal smacking storyline, "Reid did a fantastic job. He really pulled out all his menace to play that part." Harry was voted by fans as the runner up for character they would like to leave the show the most, in the Ferndale Talk Best of 2013 Awards. Television reviewer Chris Philpot stated he hated advertising more than asset sales and Harry Warner combined. Matthew Denton of the University of Auckland student magazine, Craccum, named Harry the most annoying character on Shortland Street, citing that the "spoilt whiney kid has been around for ages, causing grief for everyone" and expressed annoyance that Chris had saved his life in 2013. Across his 5 different actor portrayals, The Spinoff reviewer Tara Ward noted Harry "has remained consistent in his ability to polarise audiences. Some admire his love of drama, others loathe his indulgent behaviour."

The 'dick pic' cliffhanger went massively viral after airing, gaining international attention. In the week following the screening, a clip of the scene received over half a million views. A British journalist referred to it as, "the best ending to a soap ever" whilst a reporter for The Spinoff referred to it as an "iconic moment for New Zealand television". Columnist Alex Casey coined it as the New Zealand television moment of 2017 and noted how it had become a meme. Ethan Sills of The New Zealand Herald believed the storyline would be hard to top for the shows 2017 season. American television host Jimmy Kimmel proclaimed on his late-night talk show that, "I know a hell of a cliffhanger when I see one", before he recreated the scene playing Harry with Alec Baldwin portraying Chris. The line was voted by the New Zealand public as the 2017 quote of the year.
