= Chris Warner =

- Shortland Street character
- Portrayed by: Michael Galvin
- Duration: 1992–1996, 2000–present
- First appearance: 25 May 1992
- Introduced by: Caterina De Nave (1992); Simon Bennett (2000)
In-universe information
- Occupation: Chief Executive Officer of Shortland Street Hospital (2006–2008, 2013, 2016–2022); Former Head of Surgery (until 2024), Surgeon; Plastic Surgeon (2004); Clinic Director/Owner (2000-2001)
- Father: Bruce Warner
- Mother: Margot Warner
- Sisters: Amanda Warner
- Half-brothers: Guy Warner
- Wife: Melanie Kirk (1990-1991); Tiffany Pratt (1996–1998); Alison Raynor (1998–2001); Toni Thompson (2005–2008); Rachel McKenna (2014–2018); Miriama Ropata (2026–)
- Sons: Frank Warner; Finn Warner; Phoenix Warner; Harry Warner; James Warner
- Daughters: Sass Warner; Trinity Kwan
- Grandsons: Xin Warner
- Granddaughters: Amelie Warner
- Uncles: Garth Worthington
- Aunts: Cecile Worthington
- Nieces: Tuesday Warner
- First cousins: Isaac Worthington

Christopher Alexander Warner is a fictional character on the New Zealand soap opera Shortland Street who has been portrayed by Michael Galvin since the show's first episode. Other than a 4-year gap as a result of Galvin's resignation in 1996, Chris has appeared near-continuously making him the longest running character on the show.

Affectionately referred to by fans and in the media as "Dr Love", Chris has been characterised by his romance storylines and respected medical career that spanned from being a junior doctor, to managing the hospital. The character has been married six times and participated in over 20 romances as well as fathering six children. He was the first member of the Warner family to join the show and in the early years of Shortland Street he appeared alongside half-brother Guy Warner (Craig Parker). In later years, Chris became the patriarch of a family unit made up of his sons Harry (Reid Walker) and Phoenix (Geordie Holibar). Chris has been involved in several high profile and highly rated story lines; including a 1994 car crash, resulting drug addiction, nearly getting murdered by his brother in law Dominic Thompson (Shane Cortese), losing his wife to his drug-addicted brother Guy, ending up in jail after being framed for murder, surviving cancer and a heart attack, and a controversial abortion storyline.

The character of Chris is constantly noted as a backbone and "key character" of Shortland Street and his storylines have been well received. Galvin has also been praised for his portrayal of Chris. He was nominated for "Best Actor" at the Qantas TV and Film Awards 2008. Several of Chris's romances have also been praised, with both his marriage to Toni Thompson (Laura Hill) and his relationship with Rachel McKenna (Angela Bloomfield), landing the couplings the title of the show's "Golden Couple".

== Creation and casting ==
Created as part of the original core cast, the character (originally named "Chris Perry") was pitched as a privileged young doctor, who despite medical skill, was arrogant and focused on his sex life. Several actors auditioned for the character in 1992, with two being Michael Galvin and his flatmate Marton Csokas. Galvin went on to win the role and predicted that the show would only last six months. Csokas later went on to join the soap as Leonard Dodds in 1993. As production began, Chris's surname became Warner and the character made his first appearance on the show's first episode. Many of Galvin's co-stars became role models for him, including Elizabeth McRae (Marj Nelson), Paul Gittins (Michael McKenna), and Temuera Morrison (Hone Ropata). Galvin commented, "I learned a lot from Tem Morrison. When I started off I thought, 'I am going to make this so dramatic, everything is going to be so dramatic.' I had this completely inappropriate intensity. But Tem would come along and just float through the scene and he was just so much more watchable than me when it started. I'm sure people thought, 'Oh thank God it's him, because he's just relaxed and doing it – and who's that blond idiot dancing around.' You learn fast." Galvin stayed on the soap for several more years but began to tire of the role and quit, stating; "after four years on Shortland Street there was so much of me in Dr Warner I wasn't sure where he ended and I began." Galvin departed alongside his on-screen brother Craig Parker in an episode written by Steven Zanoski in May 1996. Originally, the characters' departure was going to lead to the series's ultimate ending. However the continued success led to further commissions and funding, and the show survived.

Following the departures of Rachel McKenna (Angela Bloomfield), Ellen Crozier (Robyn Malcolm), and Kristy Knight (Angela Dotchin), and the axing of David Kearney (Peter Elliott), in 1998 and 1999, ratings for the show dropped dramatically in 2000 and an external consultant was hired to reinvent the show, reflect modern audiences, and boost ratings. Part of this revamp was to reintroduce several fan-favourite characters and Galvin was contacted in London to see if he was interested in returning. Galvin was at first hesitant, explaining, "I kind of thought it would be very strange going back because I have such strong memories. It was a very intense period of my life, being on that show. I realised that most of the cast there will be completely new to me, I would never have worked with them." However, he accepted and upon his return to New Zealand, was asked to re-audition, "to make sure I hadn't gained 20 kg or lost a limb or developed a stutter," Galvin joked. Alongside Galvin, it was announced that Bloomfield would also return to her role as Rachel McKenna. Galvin returned to shooting in early November 2000, with Chris's first scene airing on 22 December 2000. By the show's 20th anniversary, Galvin had appeared in 2,900 episodes and announced he would be happy to stay with the show for as long as they would have him.

== Storylines ==
Chris had worked at the hospital as the young Surgeon since its opening in 1989 and had been flirting with new nurse Alison Raynor (Danielle Cormack). However behind Alison's back, Chris was sleeping with his aerobics instructor Jill Johnson (Suzy Aiken) which was shockingly revealed to the hospital when Chris missed an on-call alert. He and Alison reconciled and got engaged, only for Chris to break it off to return to his ex-wife, Melanie Kirk (Tina Regtien). The reunion was short and Chris and Alison reunited and continued with their wedding plans following a devastating miscarriage. Darryl Neilson (Mark Ferguson) had fallen in love with Alison and kidnapped Chris the night before the wedding, leading to his bride fleeing the country and leaving Chris single. He rebounded with mysterious doctor Katherine Blake (Margaret Umbers) but uncovered she had murdered her husband, leading her to run him over in her car. An intense rivalry formed with colleague Steve Mills (Andrew Binns) when Head of Nursing Carrie Burton (Lisa Crittenden) revealed Chris was the sperm-donor father of her triplet children, and he had been sleeping with Jo (Greer Robson). This led to a dramatic car crash that killed Steve and TP Aleni (Elizabeth Skeen), and left Chris paralysed. Becoming addicted to painkillers in the aftermath, Chris was helped through his addiction by Rebecca Frost (Luisa Burgess) and soon regained his ability to walk. Controversy erupted at the clinic when Chris was in charge of hiring attractive new nurse Tiffany Pratt (Alison James). Many saw chemistry between the two and assumed this was the reason she got the job. Chris denied this and Tiffany proved to be a capable nurse. However the two did develop feelings and ended up married on Valentines Day 1996. Shortly after, Chris received a job opportunity in the United States and left with brother Guy Warner (Craig Parker) and niece Tuesday Warner (Kelly Tate). Tiffany followed shortly after. The following year Chris and Tiffany divorced after she discovered him in bed with Alison. He and Alison ended up marrying off screen.

In late 2000, the clinic staff heard that a mysterious purchaser had bought the hospital and intended to transition it to the public sector. At Christmas, Chris revealed himself as the new owner and hesitantly revealed his marriage with Alison was over after he had cheated. He became engaged to Samara Hindmarsh (Jodie Rimmer) but realised she was a fraud and was saved by Rachel McKenna (Angela Bloomfield). The two fell in love but Rachel's alcoholism proved problematic and Chris had a one-night stand with nurse, Toni Thompson (Laura Hill). Toni fell pregnant and Chris became a father to Harry (Joshua Thompson). Rachel was staunchly anti-motherhood and her alcoholism worsened. The relationship ended and Chris started to date Donna Heka (Stephanie Tauevihi). The arrival of Chris's illegitimate half-brother Dom (Shane Cortese) caused trouble when Dom manipulated Donna's step daughter into pretending Chris had sexually abused her, ended the relationship between Chris and Donna. Chris stepped into the CEO position when Dr Victor Kahu (Calvin Tuteao) resigned but was dismissed when the DHB discovered his knowledge of a euthanasia within the hospital. Chris and Toni reunited in Fiji and it was soon revealed Dom was not Chris's brother at all and he attempted to murder Chris only to die in the subsequent explosion. Chris went on to marry a pregnant Toni, who fell down the family house stairs and miscarried their child. While the couple briefly separated, Chris had an affair with the prostitute Greta Saunders (Meryl Maine), who tried to poison Toni before they reunited. Struggling in his personal life and returning to the CEO position, Chris started to suffer from anxiety. The pressure lead Chris to have an affair with Justine Jones (Laurie Foell) resulting in Toni fleeing Ferndale with Chris's brother Guy and taking Harry from him.

Six months later Chris was able to track down Toni and Harry, and the relationship briefly reunited before Toni succumbed to complications from norovirus. Chris was removed from the CEO position in 2008 to focus on leading an innovative surgical training unit. Chris dated both Brooke Freeman (Beth Allen) and Libby Jeffries (Fleur Saville) before finding love with Gabrielle Jacobs (Virginie Le Brun). His relationship with Gabrielle soon faced a hurdle with the return of Rachel who had orchestrated a return to Ferndale under the guise of helping new CEO Dr Callum Mackay but with the real aim of reuniting with Chris.

Chris and Gabrielle's eventually relationship broke down, with Gabrielle accepting a job in Zurich. Chris discovered he had a teenage son named Phoenix Raynor (Geordie Holibar) whom Alison had kept secret after they split up. After years of denying his love for Rachel McKenna, the two finally reconciled in late 2010. The two moved in together and briefly separated when Chris had an affair with a returned Gabrielle. Chris was stalked and manipulated for months by Phoenix's teacher Hayley O'Neill (Michelle Blundell) and was framed for her murder by her abusive ex-boyfriend. Serving in remand prison, Chris was released 2 months later when the true killer Drew Webster (Joel Herbert), confessed. Chris had a brief return as CEO before suffering brain damage in a flying-fox incident. Desperate to become a father once again but following a refusal from Rachel, Chris embarked on a non-romantic affair with Grace Kwan (Lynette Forday), impregnating her. He and Rachel got married but when Grace lied about miscarrying and Chris covered this up, Rachel left the relationship. They eventually reconciled and Chris welcomed his daughter Trinity Kwan in late 2014. Following Rachel's relapse into alcoholism in 2016, the marriage collapsed and Chris returned to the CEO role at the hospital following her departure from Ferndale.

On Chris's 50th birthday, he began to show signs of illness and was diagnosed with stage 3 Leukemia. Undergoing chemotherapy, Chris survived the disease after receiving bone marrow from eldest son Frank Warner (Luke Patrick). Nursed to health by Kate Nathan (Laurel Devenie), the two fell in love. Kate left Chris for her true love Mo Hannah (Jarod Rawiri) and Chris began to date her younger sister Zoe Carlson (Holly Shervey). Chris was shocked when Zoe revealed she had been faking cancer, but also that she was pregnant. The couple broke up when Chris pressured her to terminate as the baby was likely to be disabled on birth, but Zoe miscarried when she was raped by The Beechwood Beast. Chris and Zoe nearly reconciled only for his heartbreak when he discovered she had mutually fallen in love with his son Finn (Lukas Whiting).

Following the death of Mo in a plane crash, Chris and Kate briefly reconciled but instead he found love with Zara Mandal (Nivi Summer), a cardiologist at the hospital. This too was short lived, and Chris soon started dating political candidate Michelle Beaufort (Lisa Chappell), who was soon elected as Member of Parliament for Ferndale. Following Phoenix's death from an overdose of drugs, Chris became heavily depressed and suicidal. Ultimately only deciding to live when he survived a bullet to the heart. He established "The Phoenix Trust", a charity dedicated towards mental health in his sons name.

Gaining the attention of his neighbour Vivienne Ewell (Katherine Kennard). Chris proposed to Michelle only for her to flee Ferndale. He fell for Viv and found himself removed from the CEO role after being cancelled for a Maori impersonation as a student, and a sexual harassment lawsuit from Zoe over their former relationship. Eventually getting together but struggling with his relationship with Viv and a custody battle over his granddaughter Amelie, Chris soon ended up single and living alone. Putting his family money together with some investors, he purchased the hospital and shifted it to a cooperative model. Chris found love with nurse Selina To'a (Bella Kalolo) but the revelation that a recently returned Harry (Xander Manktelow) had faked his medical qualifications and murdered two people before fleeing the country, sent Chris into a nervous breakdown - becoming a mute, dumping Selina, and leaving the medical profession. The untimely death of Leanne (Jennifer Ludlam) finally enabled Chris to return to normality after several months, and he returned to the hospital in a role with much-reduced responsibility.

== Character development ==
=== Characterisation ===
Throughout the nineties, Chris was portrayed as a rich playboy and was what Galvin referred to as, "flakey".

Galvin described Chris as; "Highly successful in his professional life and not so successful in his personal life. He is generous and kind, but is also a snob. He always tries to learn from his mistakes but never does." However he also called Chris "positive" and noted Chris's high expectations. Galvin believed Chris's egotism and elitism lead him to look down on the world and have constant frustration. Galvin enjoyed Chris's faults, ("he's vain, he's a snob, to name two of many") as "they're the most fun to play". Throughout 1993 and 1994, Chris's characterisation was seen to be a lot more arrogant and bitter in a purposeful attempt to flip the character around in a drug addiction storyline, that would see Chris weak and vulnerable. Galvin found that throughout the period of portraying Chris, he started to morph the character into his own characteristics, "whenever you play any role there should be as much of yourself in it as possible: you should use the role as a form of self-discovery. Rather than trying to escape yourself and going, “How do people like this behave?”, try to think instead: well, what would I do if I was that person?" Throughout the character's duration, Chris slowly began to mature and Galvin noted, "less flakey". At the start of 2002, Chris's arrogant personality struck a chord with many of his co workers, Galvin explained, "Chris Warner's a charming guy. He's had a privileged upbringing, enjoys a great career and definitely likes to think of himself as a bit of a lady-killer! Good things just seem to come his way, which can make him seem a bit cocky really. So it's great he's having a tough time. It makes him more real! Especially on the professional front. He cares a great deal for his work. It's one of his greatest passions, so when this comes under threat, you see this real vulnerability. Take Chris' work away, and what's he left with? Also, Chris is about to go through the painful discovery of who his friends really are. He's definitely in dangerous territory!" Following the 2012 storyline where he was imprisoned, Chris underwent a major personality change, Galvin commented: "Chris' social awareness was raised by his time in prison and, more specifically, by his friendship with Gus (Joe Folau) .... Having lived most his life believing he was somehow different to people like Gus, he has realised he's no better."

=== Relationships ===
When viewers were introduced to Chris in the first episode that aired in May 1992, the character's personality was already highly on show, with his first scene featuring Chris having sex with a married aerobic instructor. Because of this, Chris was already known as a "playboy" by both the characters onscreen and the audience. His multiple affairs, marriages and mindless flings over the next few years caused Chris to affectionately become known as "Dr. Love" both on and off screen. The scene was credited as defining the character and the fast-paced soap itself. Galvin believed the label was inaccurate as the character was only "sleazy" in his "first six months", however he offered his character advice saying; "I would tell him the next time he wants to sleep with someone he's not in a relationship with, he should slow down and count to 10." Many of Galvin's co stars found the label humorous including Angela Bloomfield (Rachel McKenna) who stated, "I'm so happy I don't have to jump around and kiss half the cast on screen." Although the character participated in primarily romance- and relationship-based storylines, Galvin was hesitant to acknowledge himself as a "sex symbol".

==== Tiffany Pratt ====
In 1995, the character of Tiffany Pratt (Alison James) was introduced as a new love interest for Chris. Though there was a purposeful chemistry between the two, producers left an ambiguity over whether the two would get together. Shortly into the character's arrival to the show, James predicted the two would eventually date, stating; "The problem is what they're willing to admit to each other. They have to make a decision about whether they're just friends." When Chris returned from holiday in 1996, the two got together in a "very sparky and frustrated kind of way." However, it was soon clear that there was a huge problem in their relationship, in that of Chris's flatmate Emily, the polar opposite to Tiffany. The two got engaged and married on Valentine's Day 1996. Chris departed to America with the promise Tiffany would join him when he settled in, however, in 1997 Tiffany returned from visiting Chris with the revelation he had cheated on her and the marriage was over.

==== Toni Thompson ====
Following a one-night stand with nurse Toni Thompson (Laura Hill), Chris found himself a father with the birth of a son – Harry Warner (Callum Campbell-Ross). The two did not pursue a relationship, and got involved in a bitter custody dispute. Following a trip to Fiji the two reconciled. However the couple found life together in Ferndale a lot different than the tropics of Fiji. The relationship suffered in part to Toni's murderous brother Dom (Shane Cortese), but following his death, the two reconciled. Toni fell pregnant to a second child and the couple became engaged. Galvin acknowledged that the relationship may not be long running, but believed Chris had high hopes, "He is tired of the party boy lifestyle, although he has thought that before and been proven wrong. But he is optimistic; anyone that has been married as many times as him has to be, to be embarking on it again." Galvin did however believe that the main reason for the marriage was in fact the couples son Harry, "Harry is definitely the main reason. Chris and Toni's relationship up to this point has been pretty combative, there isn't any special bond between them apart from Harry (and of course the new baby on the way.) But he hopes his relationship with Toni will blossom into one of trust, and that their love will deepen." Toni's family was also a reluctance on Chris's behalf, "Both Ngaire and Dom ripped Chris' family off for substantial amounts of money, and Dom's serial killer tendencies didn't exactly endear him to the Thompsons." The two successfully married in March 2005. Only months after the wedding, Toni miscarried their son and Chris sought solace with Greta Saunders (Meryl Maine). Despite this, on Chris's 40th birthday, he and Toni confirmed their love for each other. Following Chris's affair with Justine Jones (Lucy Wigmore) in 2007, Galvin believed Chris saw it as an escape, "He does actually value his marriage even though he is totally disrespecting it. It's more about trying to recapture the excitement his life had before he was married with a kid," and Galvin also thought that Chris was willing to stay with Toni, "Only when his relationship with Justine starts to threaten his marriage will he call it off." Following the revelation of Chris's affair with both Justine and Rachel McKenna (Angela Bloomfield), Toni fled Ferndale with Chris's brother Guy (Craig Parker), Harry and Guy's daughter Tuesday (Olivia Tennet). Toni returned at the end of 2007 and she and Chris were headed for what seemed to be a reconciliation, only for Toni to suddenly die from kidney failure. Hill hoped that the effects of Toni's death and relationship with Chris would be long running, "It would be nice to think there would be floods of tears for months on end ... I imagine Chris Warner will find someone to fill the empty bed pretty damn quick going on from past form. I think Harry will be sadder for longer. I hope so."

==== Rachel McKenna ====
Chris and Rachel McKenna (Angela Bloomfield) began a relationship in 2002 which would see the two labelled "Shortland Street's golden couple" and would continue in a "will they, won't they" scenario for more than 10 years. Out of all of Chris's love interests, Rachel has been referred to as "the love of his life." Bloomfield and Galvin established a friendship throughout working together, with Bloomfield stating, "We're like two old people who have known each other forever. We're like a pair of slippers. We're so comfortable in each other's company." Rachel was originally the daughter of Chris's boss, Michael McKenna (Paul Gittins); but throughout the nineties the two characters shared very little scenes together. When both characters returned after hiatuses in 2000 and 2001, an onscreen partnership was established between the two. Rachel developed a crush on the doctor, but Galvin was unsure of the potential relationship, "Who knows? .... If it did happen, it wouldn't matter that we are friends. Passion for the cameras is all part of the job, and it's definitely not like the real thing." Rachel exposed Chris's fiancée Samara (Jodie Rimmer) as a fraud and at first Chris despised her, but quickly the crush became mutual. When Rachel was kidnapped by the manic Jack (Manu Bennett), Chris saved her and the two started a relationship. However, with the birth of Chris's son and Rachel's refusal to be a mother, the relationship started to deteriorate and Rachel turned to the bottle. As 2002 came to a close, Chris ended his relationship with the out-of-control Rachel. He got together with Donna and an extremely drunk Rachel tried to ring him while driving, resulting in a near fatal car crash. Rachel fled Ferndale, embarrassed and alone. Bloomfield admitted that though the relationship was over, Rachel was still feeling unrequited love. In 2006, Galvin called for the return of Rachel as the couple had "unfinished business" and named her as possibly Chris's most suitable match. Rachel returned in 2007 with the same feelings for Chris and the two slept together before she left. Rachel returned in 2009 on business reasons, but it was clear to the audience and to the on-screen characters, that her true plan was to win Chris back.

Bloomfield stated, "Rachel arrives back in Ferndale on a mission to win back Chris Warner. Chris and her share a lot of history, and she's decided that it's time they get back together once and for all" and admitted that Chris was "the one that got away". Steven Zanoski acknowledged that Rachel was willing to move on after Chris, but stated that there were unresolved feelings between the ex lovers. Rachel knew Chris still had feelings for her, with Bloomfield stating, "Rachel is determined to get Chris back and she's willing to go to any length to make it happen. She feels it's only a matter of time become he succumbs ... Rachel can sense Chris feels something for her". Peter Mochrie admitted that his character's (Callum McKay) relationship with Rachel was mainly a fill-in for Chris, stating: "In the back of his mind, Chris is always going to be the love of Rachel's life and he's trying to put a good spin on that and do as much as he can. Callum's the sort of guy that will cook and bring flowers and do romantic stuff for her. But who knows? I have a sneaking feeling Chris will be back... but we'll see." Zanoski thought it was best Rachel and Chris never got together permanently, but nonetheless, in June 2010 Chris realised he was still in love with Rachel and she too reaccessed her feelings. Bloomfield offered an explanation as to why the two characters keep going back to each other, saying: "They are gluttons for punishment. They have a huge history. Chris tried to help Rachel with her alcoholism years ago. They have just always been attracted to each other." The love triangle between Rachel, Chris and Callum saw Bloomfield explain the storyline, stating: "She's set herself up with a guy that's great; that offers her a lot of things, that to a lot of women would be wonderful, but he's not the love of her life and she has the love of her life, kinda in the next room."

The two finally got together as 2010 ended but whilst Rachel broke it off with Callum, all three got stuck in a devastating explosion. The couple were said to be playing "happy families", with Rachel becoming a surrogate mother to Chris's children. However this came into question when Rachel became the centre of a highly topical storyline when she illegally physically punished Chris's son Harry (Reid Walker). The two's romance became a pivotal point of the 2011 cliffhanger, with the two playing happy families, Rachel was oblivious to the fact Gabrielle Jacobs had announced her love to Chris. Gabrielle and Chris started an affair as the year ended. Rachel and Chris broke up but reunited in 2012 for the show's 20th anniversary, however Galvin hinted the worst of their relationship was yet to come, saying; "It gets very rocky. And just when you think it's hit rock bottom it gets much, much worse." Chris was arrested for murder but eventually released, and the relationship suffered, with Bloomfield explaining: "Rachel feels confused because she naively assumed everything would go back to normal post prison. And even though she knows it can't, it's her way of coping ... It's more about not recognizing Chris because he's changed and that scares her."

==== Libby Jeffries ====
In 2007, Chris's personal assistant Libby Jeffries (Fleur Saville) developed a crush on him and in November, made moves on him unsuccessfully. Saville commented, "Libby has always held a candle for Chris. She sees that Chris is more than just good looks, charm and impeccable breeding." She supported him throughout his personal problems in 2008 and in early 2009, realised she was still smitten with her boss. Saville commented, "Chris represents everything that Libby sees as a perfect husband – educated, successful, well dressed and respected." Saville also noted that Chris was the "polar" opposite to Libby's ex-boyfriend Kieran Mitchell (Adam Rickitt) and "that's also a major attraction." Chris had previously been uncomfortable with Libby's flirting but realised he too had a crush and the two began to date. Galvin believed Chris and Libby had several things in common, "Libby's like the ideal corporate wife. She's a great hostess, great mingler, young and attractive. But she's not just that – they also have a lot of fun together." Libby struggled to get along with Chris's co worker, Gabrielle Jacobs (Virginie Le Brun), but tried to accommodate her for Chris. Saville commented, "Despite the fact that Libby finds Gabrielle's behavior difficult to understand, she wants to show Chris that she is a caring and thoughtful person." Whilst in the relationship, Chris realised he had fallen in love with Gabrielle and a love triangle emerged. However Galvin noted that Libby was no doubt the ultimate loser, "She's lovely, but he needs someone more kind of on his wavelength." Chris took a trip to Venice and whilst he was away, Libby accidentally burnt down his living room. His return saw him dump Libby for Gabrielle.

==== Gabrielle Jacobs ====
In 2009, the character of Gabrielle Jacobs (Virginie Le Brun) was introduced and it was said she was to, "immediately cause some consternation amongst her colleagues." Despite being in a relationship with Libby Jeffries (Fleur Saville), he and Gabrielle started to share a lot of scenes together on screen, The two were referred to as "Spock and Kirk" by a writer of the show, referencing the famous Star Trek characters. Chris soon left Libby for Gabrielle under the impression that she was, 'the one'. Galvin believed the two characters had chemistry as there was a "meeting of the minds". Producer Steven Zanoski liked the partnership but noted flaws, stating; "Chris has always gone out with glamorous women in the past and now he's found someone who challenges his mind, it helps that she is gorgeous as well. Chris is slowly trying to change Gabrielle, but whether she wants to be changed is another story." Galvin commented, "I think Gabrielle is actually extremely suited to him, in spite of her Asperger's. Gabrielle could be the one, you never know. WIfe number six." Whilst looking after Chris's son Harry (Reid Walker), the boy ran away, something with shook Chris and Gabrielle's relationship. Galvin commented, "Deeply concerned for the safety of his son, Chris can't help but think Gabrielle is partly to blame." Gabrielle soon grew sick of the patronising nature of Chris and dumped him shortly before leaving the country. Le Brun enjoyed the pairing of Gabrielle and Chris, stating; "There was a nice dynamic between them because Chris is so used to being the top gun in everything. For once, someone could challenge him to do things he hadn't done before such as playing mental chess. I think it was that sort of thing that put him on the back foot and why he had his heart broken." As 2011 ended, Chris and Gabrielle began a short lived affair, a situation named by Lydia Jenkin of The New Zealand Herald as an "eventful turn".

==== Other relationships ====
Chris's first real love interest was Alison Raynor who he ended up marrying after both characters had departed the show. However, before he married Alison, Chris had also dated several other characters including Rebecca Frost and had married and divorced; Tiffany Pratt. Several years into his return, Chris slept with his son's nanny played by Siobhan Marshall, something Galvin lists as Chris's greatest accomplishment. In 2006, Chris's first wife Melanie Kirk (Julie Crean) returned to the show and Galvin believed Chris was happy to see her back, "He is definitely happy to see her, they parted on fairly good terms and he is pleasantly surprised." In describing Chris's affair with Justine Jones (Lucy Wigmore), Galvin stated: "Chris' ego is starting to run away with him a bit and part of that is the desire to feel like he is still an attractive prospect to women ... It's definitely on the cards that he could be using Justine not just to increase his confidence as a surgeon, but increase his confidence as a person." Chris dated the mysterious Brooke Freeman (Beth Allen) in 2008 but was shocked to learn she was from an infamous fraud family and ended up breaking it off after she clashed with Harry.

== Reception ==
Popular both with fans and critics alike, Michael Galvin has got praise throughout his time on the show getting nominated for Best Actor at the 2008 Qantas TV and Film Awards and numerous nominations in the TV Guide Best on the Box Awards. He has been identified as a "key character", who delivers "the shock factor". Following the airing of the show's first ever episode, Colleen Reilly from the Dominion Sunday Times noted Chris and Alison's (Danielle Cormack) relationship as a highlight and pondered how it would develop. Reviewer Hugh Sundae of the New Zealand Herald praised Galvins acting in the 2010 90 Minute episode saying he was "good" and "consistent". For marketing for Galvin's play Station to Station, Chris was described as; 'perennially popular'. In 2002, Chris was named the 10th best character to ever feature on the show. In 2012, the character was named as one of the standout characters of the show's first 20 years.

Following Chris's departure in 1996, the show's publicists received constant fanmail asking for his return. Chris received negative backlash upon his return in 2000 for not showing the same characteristics as he had when he left and for being "boring" and no longer a "rogue". However, in 2013, Chris's return was listed as the shows best ever character return by the Shortland Street website. The 2012 storyline that saw Chris stalked and manipulated by an ex patient Hayley O'Neill (Michelle Blundell) and concluded in him being framed for her murder, was named by Lydia Jenkin of The New Zealand Herald as one of the soap's best story lines. The 2013 storyline which saw Chris deal with son, Phoenix Raynor's (Geordie Holibar) teenage angst, was criticised by a television critic who believed the trouble Phoenix was getting into was, "not interesting enough trouble for me to really care".

Galvin enjoyed the storylines where he acted alongside his good friends, which included Tim Balme (Greg Feeney), Shane Cortese (Dominic Thompson) and Craig Parker (Guy Warner). Coincidentally all the storylines involving Galvin's friends revolved around their respective characters antagonising Chris. Galvin's least favourite storyline for Chris revolved around the hospital's musical production where Chris had to rap. The episode aired on 12 September 2001, overshadowed by the news of the September 11 attacks and was subsequently the lowest rated episode of the show to ever air. Galvin also found the storyline of Chris's father Bruce's death difficult to film due to his own father's ill health and disproved of the teenage suicide storyline that aired in 1992 due to its graphic nature. The scene featured in the 2013 cliffhanger episode, which depicted Chris leading the cast in a singalong of The Mutton Birds' song, Anchor Me, was described by Chris Philpot of The New Zealand Herald as, "the most bizarre things that has ever happened on Shortland Street".

Due to the characters longevity on screen, Chris has earned himself comparison to Coronation Street's Ken Barlow and Home and Away's Alf Stewart.

=== Note ===
- ^Note 1In episode 3111, aired 14 November 2004, Dominic Thompson gives the name "Christopher Bruce Warner" which matches the stolen license he obtained from Chris, as seen in the hand of the police officer who pulled him over.
