= Grace Kwan =

- Shortland Street character
- Portrayed by: Lynette Forday
- Duration: 1994–1997, 2013–2014
- First appearance: 15 February 1994; Episode 452
- Last appearance: 11 December 2014
- Introduced by: Tony Holden (1994); Simon Bennett (2013)
- Book appearances: Kirsty and Lionel - Shortland Street Books (1996)
In-universe information
- Occupation: Ferndale District Health Board auditor (2013, 2014); Chief Executive Officer at Shortland Street hospital (2014); Consultant at Shortland Street A&E clinic (1994–97); Doctor at St. Katherines clinic (until 1994)
- Father: Ken Kwan
- Mother: Joy Kwan
- Sons: Kirk Kwan; Scott Kwan
- Daughters: Trinity Kwan

Dr. Grace Kwan is a fictional character on the New Zealand soap opera Shortland Street, portrayed by Lynette Forday from 1994 to 1997. Forday reprised the role 16 years later in 2013.

== Creation and casting ==
At a time when producers were structuring Shortland Street as a soap with a culturally diverse cast, the character of Grace Kwan was created - a hard working Asian doctor. In 1994, Lynette Forday joined the cast as the part of Grace. After 3 years on the soap, Forday left the soap with Grace making her final appearance in 1997. In 2013 Forday was offered to reprise the role after 16 years off screen, to which she was happy to agree. She signed an initial "Major Recurring Guest" contract, which would see the character appear through to 2014. Forday described returning to the set as "odd" but also "wonderful". Forday had considered the idea of returning to play Grace as a "no-brainer" and was happy to work alongside her former co worker, Michael Galvin (Dr. Chris Warner), "It was very surreal ... We have been doing a lot of work together and he's just lovely. He's been very helpful and is amazing." In October Television New Zealand announced Grace would be returning to the show during the month. Grace made her return on screen on 23 October 2013. Grace departed on 24 February 2014 but returns a couple of months later in May 2014 she made her last appearance 11 December 2014.

== Storylines ==
=== 1994-1997 ===
Following the departure of Simon Hilton-Jones (John Wraight) from Shortland Street clinic, Chief Executive Officer Michael McKenna (Paul Gittins) decided to poach Grace from his rival Sir Bruce Warner's (Ken Blackburn) St Catherine’s clinic, as part of a plan to open a High Dependency Unit. Bruce was devastated to hear Grace was leaving and made a hugely public announcement of his love for her in the Kennedy's bar, to which she rejected him. Grace began work at Shortland Street, though her naturally flirtatious manner led many to believe she was having an affair with both Bruce and Michael - resulting in Michael's wife Alex (Liddy Holloway) confronting the duo at the opening of the HDU; whilst her direct communication style put her offside with the other doctors on staff.

With the staffing needs changing in order to support the HDU, Grace was able to put forward best friend Ellen Crozier (Robyn Malcolm) for the Director of Nursing position. However their friendship was soon tested when Guy Warner (Craig Parker) started investigating an old drug trial that may have resulted in patients developing epilepsy. Grace was a supervisor of the trial and Ellen’s daughter Minnie Crozier was a participant. Uncovering her old mentor’s corruption, the trial was referred to a special commission and Minnie did not have epilepsy. In May, the hospital was placed under the management of Australian company Ideal Health. Soon after Ideal purchased St Catherine’s and Grace was offered the role of Head of Surgery there, however she decided to invest more money into Shortland Street along with other clinic staff when it adopted a cooperative model.

Following the departure of Dr Meredith Fleming (Stephanie Wilkin), Grace joined the in-house IVF Clinic and commenced a relationship with the clinical lead Dr Donald Phyfe (Iain Rae). Donald and Grace move into the apartment adjoining Chris Warner’s. Inspired by an Asian patient’s need for a Chinese egg donor, Grace volunteered to become an egg donor. Darryl Neilson (Mark Ferguson) became an investor of the IVF Clinic and developed a flirtation with Grace, whilst also pressuring Donald into supplying him with eggs to sell overseas. The pressure caused Donald to flee the country, and upon finding out that her eggs had been sold overseas, Grace declined to continue to work in the IVF clinic. Without any doctors associated with the IVF program, McKenna sold the IVF clinic and Grace returned to focusing on HDU and surgery.

Grace subsequently had a brief relationship with Zac Smith (Mike Edward) but ended up deciding to flee Ferndale after falling back in love with Darryl. However Darryl's dead body was found in the Auckland harbor. In 1996, Grace fell in love with Lionel Skeggins (John Leigh) but instead took up with Minnie’s father, Ryan Birch (Robert Harte). However she soon came to realize Ryan had in fact raped her Ellen several years beforehand and they broke up. Grace finally got together with Lionel but the romance was short lived and she moved onto Frank Malone (Christopher Hobbs). In 1997 whilst cooking, Grace accidentally severed her finger however luckily managed to reattach it. Shortly after, Grace got a job in Australia and departed Ferndale. The following year, Ellen visited Grace and returned with the news that she had become a mother to two twin boys.

=== 2013-2014 ===
Grace returned to Ferndale in October 2013 to audit the hospital following the CEO, Chris Warner's (Michael Galvin) health concerns. It soon transpired that Grace had been through a devastating break up and was in desperate need to be a mother. She made an agreement with Chris that would see the two have sex without complications so as to have a child. Grace then realise that she has feelings for Chris and then tried to stop his wedding to Rachel McKenna. She then leave Ferndale after Chris couldn't return her feelings and she leaves after she lied that she had a miscarriage.

A couple of months later, Grace returns after Chris tracks her down with the help of Brooke Freeman who tells him she is in Sydney. Chris then goes to her hotel room and Grace is shocked to see him They argue over custody, and Chris threatens legal action to secure his rights. She reacts badly and then she reveals he's had twin boys taken off her in a legal battle before. Her ongoing fear she's a bad mother also means she's struggling with recent news - there's a chance their baby will have a chromosomal abnormality if it does she may have to termite it. This rocks Chris. Chris offers to accompany Grace to her amniocentesis test the next day, stressing that until then, the threat of an abnormality is hypothetical. Grace breaks down, grateful, and this paves the way for a calmer talk about the future. Knowing he wants this baby in his life, Chris pledges his full support, regardless of the outcome. She learns that Chris hasn't told Rachel that his baby is alive; she forces him to tell her soon. In May 2014 it is revealed that their baby is a girl. In October 2014 while in Fiji, Grace gave birth to her daughter in a van where Boyd Rolleston and Harper Whitley were helping. Following the birth, Grace named her daughter Trinity Margot Kwan.

In November 2026, Chris finds out that Grace has suddenly died after suffering an aneurysm while out jogging.

== Character development ==
During her first stint in 1994, Grace was portrayed as a "fun" and "strong" woman.

=== Characterisation ===
Forday enjoyed the characterization of Grace and the emotions it allowed her to play, "I loved the character of Grace ... it's lovely to play a strong woman who is still fun. It's nice to see on screen, a woman who is still successful and strong but also prepared to have fun, not being portrayed as just a dragon lady." Michael Galvin described Grace as a woman who, "takes no prisoners and she doesn't put up with any bullshit. Chris tries to outwit her and fails. She's very smart, very strong." Despite her age compared to her first stint, Forday believed Grace was, "still prepared to have fun".

=== Baby storyline ===
In 2013, Grace underwent a storyline that saw her plead with Chris Warner to provide her with children. The storyline saw the two characters agree to create a child whilst refraining from a relationship in what Galvin described as a "problematic" deal. Grace had previously undergone a birth storyline off screen in 1998, when Ellen Crozier (Robyn Malcolm) announced she had given birth to twin boys - however following Grace's return, this was not acknowledged. Producer Simon Bennett assured it would be discussed however, "Shortland Street will be covering this, and what became of Grace's twins, in a story that hasn't yet gone to air". Grace, Chris and Chris' fiancé, Rachel McKenna (Angela Bloomfield) all agreed upon a "natural way" of reproduction, in a storyline the cast agreed would "divide" fans. Bloomfield found the storyline odd as she pointed out natural conception was one of the least effective methods of fertilization.

== Reception ==
Despite only appearing for three years in the mid nineties, Grace was said to have made a "lasting impression" on fans of the time. The character of Grace was criticized by columnist Tze Ming Mok who although praised Shortland Street for involving Asian characters, found her very unrepresentative of Asian culture. She did however point out that the character was a more favorable portrayal than the later character of Li Mei Chen (Li Ming Hu). Michael Galvin (Chris Warner) pointed out the storyline that saw Grace give Chris an emergency tracheotomy with her Star Trek pen in 1994 as one of the most memorable moments of the soap opera. In the Ferndale Talk Best of 2013 awards, Grace overwhelmingly won the award for "Favourite character to return". Television New Zealand named Grace's return as the 9th best thing to occur in the 2013 season. Grace's return storylines were criticized by fans due to the lack of acknowledgment towards the twins she birthed off screen in 1998.
