= Phoenix Warner =

Phoenix Raynor
- Shortland Street character
- Portrayed by: Geordie Holibar
- Duration: 2010–2013, 2019–2020
- First appearance: 2 August 2010
- Last appearance: 17 December 2020
- Introduced by: Steven Zanoski (2010); Maxine Fleming (2019)
In-universe information
- Other names: Phoenix Warner
- Occupation: Artist
- Father: Chris Warner
- Mother: Alison Raynor
- Half-brothers: Frank Warner; Finn Warner; Harry Warner; James Warner
- Half-sisters: Sass Warner; Trinity Kwan
- Daughters: Amelie Warner
- Grandfathers: Sir Bruce Warner; Kevin Raynor
- Grandmothers: Margot, Lady Warner; Irene Raynor
- Uncles: Guy Warner
- Aunts: Amanda Warner
- First cousins: Tuesday Warner
- Other relatives: Cecile Worthington; Desmond Worthington; Garth Worthington; Brian Raynor

Phoenix Warner (previously Raynor) is a fictional character on the New Zealand soap opera Shortland Street. He has been portrayed by Geordie Holibar since his debut in the show's first ever 90 minute episode in August 2010. The character was introduced as the previously unknown son of long-standing character Chris Warner (Michael Galvin) and ex-wife Alison Raynor (Danielle Cormack). The character departed after dying of an overdose in the episode airing 23 October 2020. Phoenix later returned that December when Chris imagined him as a ghost.

== Creation and casting ==
After creating the role, producers researched baby name trends throughout the nineties and decided upon the name; "Phoenix". Geordie Holibar, the grandson of former Shortland Street actor Liddy Holloway was cast and the character made his debut in the show's first-ever feature-length episode on 2 August 2010. Holibar's uncle Joel Tobeck helped him prepare for the role as he had previously appeared in the mid-1990s. Initially Holibar shared a lot of scenes with on screen father, Michael Galvin, but as his storylines developed, he ended up spending a lot more scenes with the fellow teenage characters. Holibar enjoyed acting alongside people his age, saying; "I have lots of fun with Frankie [Adams] (Ula Levi), Tyler [Read] (Evan Cooper) and Pearl [McGlashan] (Jasmine Cooper). It's been cool working with people your own age because you know that you're all going through the same kind of thing." Holibar noted the help he received from long time cast members, Galvin and Angela Bloomfield, "It's good just working with him and Angela who have been on the show for so long and they know where the cameras are, they know not to block your light. They know all the tricks." Phoenix departed the show in 2013, when Holibar returned to theatre work.

Holibar reprised his role in 2019, with the character returning on 5 December 2019. Holibar had not returned to the set since departing 6 years beforehand but felt "super welcome" filming his first scenes. The character of Phoenix was said to undergo a more "flawed" character arc upon returning. Holibar departed the soap in February 2020 but was happy to reprise the role as he was "holding out hope for Phoenix's redemption. I love the character so here's hoping." Phoenix returned on screen in August before being killed off two months later. The character died on-screen on 23 October 2020. Phoenix continued to appear throughout 2020 as a hallucination.

== Storylines ==
Phoenix is born to Alison Raynor (Danielle Cormack) and her divorced husband, Chris Warner (Michael Galvin). Alison decides to keep Phoenix a secret from Chris and the two live in America. After Alison grows sick of the American schooling system, she and Phoenix travel to New Zealand and live on a farm. In November 2009, Alison dies on a yacht, and Phoenix is taken in by her uncle Brian (Ian Mune).

Chris learns in August 2010 that Phoenix is his son and, after a DNA test, he adopts him. Phoenix struggles to get on with half-brother Harry (Reid Walker) but befriends Evan Cooper (Tyler Read). New girl Ula Levi (Frankie Adams) spreads a rumour that Phoenix is gay after he rebuffs a kiss from her, but the two later date briefly in 2011. He dumps her for Evan's sister Jasmine (Pearl McGlashan) but cheats on Jasmine when he has a one-night stand with Suzy (Maisey McSwiney). Phoenix is shocked when Jasmine dies for several minutes on his lap due to her Long QT syndrome and later struggles to cope with her newfound morbid personality, which causes the two to break up numerous times. Phoenix ultimately ends the relationship when he develops an unrequited crush on Megan (Lira Edwards). Phoenix is shocked when Chris is arrested for the murder of his school tutor, Hayley O'Neill (Michelle Blundell) and struggles to accept his protest of innocence. However, he ends up freeing his father when Hayley's true killer, Drew (Joel Herbert), kidnaps him and confesses.

In 2013, Phoenix begins to date popular schoolgirl Britney Buchanan (Eliza McKay) but the two break up after meddling from new girl, Dayna Jenkins (Lucy Elliott). Phoenix soon turns against his family's lifestyle and takes up street art to express his true beliefs. This, however, leads to near legal trouble and in November, Phoenix decides to leave Ferndale to study at a Berlin university for art. Only a month after his departure, Chris reveals that Phoenix has dropped out of the school and is now traveling the world. In 2014, Chris states that Phoenix would not be returning for his wedding but would rather attend via video chat.

Phoenix surprises Chris when he returns in December 2019 with his heavily pregnant girlfriend Tess (Becky McEwen). Chris soon realises that Phoenix has struggled in Berlin as an artist and owes significant amounts of money. He hires him as an office administrator, much to Phoenix's angst due to being eager to continue creating art. Following the birth of his daughter Amelie, Phoenix begins to syphon money from the hospital accounts to pay back debts and invest in further artistic endeavours. As the crimes became more apparent and Phoenix's family started to become aware, he attempts to convince Tess and Amelie to flee the country with him to no avail. Chris and Tess are subsequently saddened to learn he had stolen $1,000,000 from the hospital and fled to Chile.

Phoenix returns in August 2020 and is rushed into hospital with injuries acquired overseas, alleging police brutality. After lashing out at Tess for getting engaged to Prince after Phoenix left, Chris chastises his son for his prior behaviour. Seemingly reconciling with Tess, Phoenix pickpockets her and removes his bonds that are attached to prevent him leaving the hospital. After a suicide attempt, Phoenix falls under the tuteledge of former Doctor, Simon Ashton, who helps Phoenix come clean about his crimes and to try gain custody of Amelie. This proves to no avail as Phoenix becomes addicted to prescription medication and dies of a drug overdose that October. He reappears as a ghost to his father in December.

== Character development ==
=== Characterisation ===
Phoenix was initially portrayed as a teenager who although often landed himself in bad situations, was friendly and welcoming to all those he interacted with. He earned the title "Mr Nice Guy" however a storyline in 2012 that revolved around Phoenix developing a crush on his psychopathic maths tutor Hayley O'Neill (Michelle Blundell), saw the characterization of the character develop drastically differently. Holibar explained, "He's grown up, he's sort of had to". Hayley manipulated Phoenix's affections to try to get closer to his father and ended up accusing Phoenix of sadistically stalking her. This led to Phoenix being "angsty and angry". Holibar enjoyed what the storyline did for his character, "I've enjoyed it. I like getting angry and I do occasionally. It was fun playing something that wasn't just Phoenix being nice to everyone 24-7, which gets a bit boring to do. It was good to see a darker side as he starts pushing people away and not coping at all with the things going on for him." Upon Phoenix's return in 2019, Holibar believed "adult Phoenix" was "flawed" and was very different from the "many years ... being very nice" from his first stint. This conflicted with becoming a father as Phoenix, "is thinking more of himself than his partner and his child ... and ... it's a big life shift for someone who has been thinking about himself for so long. He's still adjusting to having something more important to prioritise." He was said to be "charming" but was beginning to show his "true character now he has no money". The character return-arc was said to paint him as a "pantomine" which Holibar understood as he believed Phoenix "handled it terribly. I think at every point he made the wrong call ... I could see it coming in terms of the dishonesty and the money troubles early on but it was still a big surprise and he definitely takes it to the extreme and goes all out really."

== Reception ==
Upon Phoenix's arrival, Shortland Street commentator Throng was surprised such an interesting storyline twist had not already occurred. Hugh Sundae from The New Zealand Herald praised Holibar's acting and compared him positively to Lee Donoghue, the actor of Hunter McKay. He also stated that Holibar was already a greater actor than Ido Drent (Daniel Potts) despite only appearing in a small number of scenes. Holibar's on screen father, Michael Galvin, praised Holibar - stating: He's very relaxed and very natural for someone of his age and very keen to learn, which is a very important thing on this show because it's very demanding." Holibar won the "Up and Coming Actor" award in the Girlfriend Faves Forever competition 2011 for his role as Phoenix. Upon Phoenix's return, a television columnist referred to the character as, "Everyone's least favourite", and "the most Foolish Warner child". Another reviewer listed the return of the "well-loved" character as one of the show's "best kept secrets". Online feedback for the character saw mass dislike for the villain-style storyline he undertook.
