= List of Shortland Street characters introduced in 2002 =

The following is a list of characters that first appeared in the New Zealand soap opera Shortland Street in 2002, by order of first appearance.

== Delphi Greenlaw ==
Delphine "Delphi" Greenlaw made her debut on 22 March 2002 as the younger sister of Geoff (Andrew Laing) and Anne Greenlaw (Emmeline Hawthorne). A tomboy, Delphi was shown to prefer Rugby over fashion and entered a whirlwind of controversy when she dated the much older, Dominic Warner (Shane Cortese). She was portrayed by Anna Hutchison until 2004.

== Harry Warner ==
Harry Warner (né Thompson-Warner) first appeared in May 2002. He was portrayed by Reid Walker from 2009 to 2018.
