= Michael Galvin =

New Zealand actor, singer and playwright

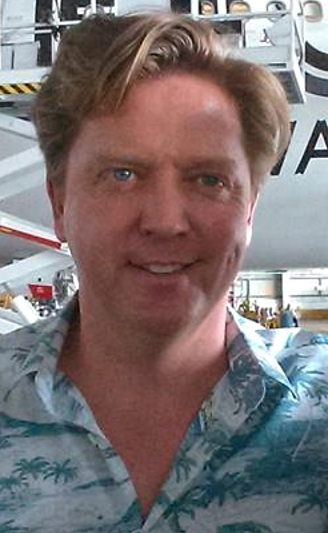
- Galvin in Fiji filming Shortland Street, 2014
- Born: Michael Sydney Galvin; 1966 (age 59–60); London, England
- Citizenship: United Kingdom; New Zealand
- Education: Victoria University of Wellington; Toi Whakaari
- Occupations: Television actor; playwright
- Notable work: Shortland Street
- Spouse: Melissa Dines (m. 2004; sep. 2009)
- Children: 1
- Relatives: Bernie Galvin (father); Margaret Clark (stepmother)

Michael Sydney Galvin (born 1966) is a New Zealand actor, singer and playwright, well known for his role as Chris Warner on the soap opera Shortland Street, a character he has played almost since the show's debut in 1992 until 1996 and again from 2000 to present, and remains as of 2025, the only original cast member. He is the longest serving television soap opera actor in New Zealand.

== Early life and family ==
Galvin was born in 1966 in London, where his father, economist Bernie Galvin was posted by the New Zealand government. His mother, Beverley, was a social worker and psychologist. The family returned to New Zealand when Galvin was two years old, and he grew up in the Wellington suburb of Khandallah. His parents' marriage ended when Galvin was 11, and he subsequently lived mainly with his father and stepmother, political scientist Margaret Clark.

Galvin was educated at St Patrick's College, Wellington, and went on to study at both Victoria University of Wellington and Toi Whakaari: New Zealand Drama School. He graduated from Toi Whakaari with a Diploma in Acting in 1989, and from Victoria with a Bachelor of Arts degree the same year.

== Career ==
=== Shortland Street ===
In 1992 Galvin, a theatre actor at the time, auditioned for a role as Chris Warner in the upcoming Television New Zealand soap opera, Shortland Street alongside his flatmate Marton Csokas. Galvin won the role, with Csokas later going on to play Leonard Dodds. Galvin predicted the show would only last 12 months. Galvin portrayed Chris for four years, with the character picking up the nickname "Dr. Love" for the numerous love affairs he participated in. Galvin soon grew sick of portraying Chris, being quoted as saying "after four years on Shortland Street there was so much of me in Dr Warner I wasn't sure where he ended and I began." He quit and went travelling to seek further job opportunities.

=== Theatre ===
Galvin played Raoul in the 1993 New Zealand tour of Ken Hill's Phantom of the Opera.

=== Overseas and return to Shortland Street ===
During this time, he had roles in the television productions Highwater and Coverstory, and feature film The Climb, which starred John Hurt. Galvin was asked to return to Shortland Street in 2000 following a revamp of the show. He returned in the season final much to the delight of his fans. Since returning, Galvin has written many plays including the successful Station to Station, and in 2007 Galvin was recognised as an outstanding emerging playwright, winning New Zealand's most significant national theatre award, the Bruce Mason Playwriting Award. His play War Hero about pacifist Archibald Baxter was performed in Wellington in 2026.

In October 2019 he was presented with a Scroll of Honour from the Variety Artists Club of New Zealand for his contribution to New Zealand entertainment.

== Personal life ==
Galvin married Melissa Dines, with whom he shares a daughter, in 2004, but the couple separated five years later. He was introduced to Melissa through on-screen girlfriend Angela Bloomfield (Rachel McKenna).

== Filmography ==
Film
Year	Film	Role	Other notes
1989	Ray Bradbury Theatre	Runner	TV series
1990	Shark in the Park	Alistair	TV series
1990	Neighbourhood Watch	Dennis	TV series
1990	Safe Sex	Simon	TV series
1991	Coverstory	Mark Churchill	TV series
1992	Highwater	Jeremy	TV series
1992	Charity Queens	Jonty	TV series
1992–1996; 2000–present	Shortland Street	Dr. Chris Warner	TV series Nominated – Qantas TV and Film awards 2008 Best Actor
1997	Highwater	Jeremy	TV movie
1998	The Climb	Father Cronin	
2001	What Now! 20th Birthday Special	Himself	TV series
2002	Strassman	Himself	TV series
2007	The Devil Dared Me To	Good Looking Actor	
2025	The Brokenwood Mysteries	James Hathaway	TV series
