= Angela Bloomfield =

New Zealand actress

- Born: Angela Bloomfield; 11 December 1972 (age 53); New Zealand
- Occupations: Television actress, director
- Spouse: Chris Houston
- Children: 2

Angela Bloomfield (born 11 December 1972) is a New Zealand actress and director.

== Early life ==
Bloomfield attended Massey High School in West Auckland, New Zealand.

== Career ==
Bloomfield has starred in Shortland Street continuously on and off for 24 years, transforming Rachel McKenna from the school girl daughter of clinic boss into a university student, a Shortland Street clinic employee and CEO of Shortland Street Hospital.

Bloomfield has also performed in a number of feature films including Bonjour Timothy and The Frighteners. She has also had smaller roles in television shows such as The Adventures of the Black Stallion, Betty's Bunch, Ride with the Devil and Power Rangers Ninja Storm in small roles. Bloomfield paused acting for three years when she became a mother of two but she continued directing for Shortland Street. Bloomfield has also been a contestant on the N.Z show, Dancing with the Stars and was voted as having New Zealand's best breasts for the Fayreform National Breast Pride Week in 2006. Bloomfield returned to Shortland Street as Rachel in October 2009 as a series regular before leaving the soap once again in 2016. In August 2021, it was announced that she would feature in the 2021 Season of Celebrity Treasure Island 2021.. Bloomfield had returned to Shortland Street once again in 2026.

== Personal life ==
Bloomfield is separated from husband Chris Houston and has two children. She currently works in the real estate industry on the North Shore.

== Filmography ==
=== Film ===
Year	Title	Role	Notes
1996	The Frighteners	Debra Bannister	
1996	Bonjour Timothy	Vikki	
2002	Nova	Girlfriend	Short
2013	Linda's List		Short
2016	Presentiment	Kaitlyn Steinberg	Short, completed

=== Television ===
Year	Title	Role	Notes
1993–99, 2001–03, 2007, 2009–16, 2026	Shortland Street	Rachel McKenna	Regular role
2003	Power Rangers Ninja Storm	Leanne	"Double-Edged Blake"
2007	Ride with the Devil	Shona Pierce	Main role
2021	Celebrity Treasure Island	Self	Competition
2024	The Brokenwood Mysteries	Laura Lyman	1 episode
2026	Blue Murder Motel	Sheree	1 episode

== Other work ==
Year	Title	Notes
2000	Jackson's Wharf	Director, 1 episode
2009	Go Girls	Director, 4 episodes
2010-13, 17 , 26	Shortland Street	Director, 86 episodes
2013	Linda's List	Co-director & co-writer, short
