= Damo Johnson =

- Shortland Street character
- Portrayed by: Grant Lobban
- Duration: 2015–2023
- First appearance: 11 May 2015
- Last appearance: 21 December 2023
- Introduced by: Simon Bennett (2015); Oliver Driver (2023)
In-universe information
- Occupation: Head of Information Technologies department IT Technician
- Mother: Naomi Johnson
- Sisters: Kelly-Anne Johnson
- Wife: Desdemona Schmidt (2022—)
- Sons: Donny Johnson
- First cousins: Rahu Parata

Damien Alexander Heathcliff Johnson is a fictional character on the New Zealand soap opera Shortland Street. Portrayed by comedian Grant Lobban, Damo first appeared over several years in a guest role before becoming a regular character in 2017. Primarily written as comic relief, Damo has also featured in storylines such as his diagnosis of bowel cancer, attempted suicide, bullying and men's mental health due to stress.

== Creation and casting ==
The character of Damo was created for a one-off guest appearance in 2015, with comedian Grant Lobban securing the role. He knew the role was short term so believed, "I'm going to give it everything I've got and play with it and be this big dorky guy', so I just went for it really." The character proved incredibly popular, leading to Damo being written into further episodes, in a "on and off" basis before returning as a full-time character in 2017. Lobban was pleased to have a regular role in Damo and hoped for it to be permanent, stating, "I'd love it to continue." After 7 years in the cast, Lobban quit the role to relocate to Christchurch believing, “I haven’t regretted it for a minute.” Damo departed the show in October 2022. Lobban continued to make guest appearances on the soap, including during the 2023 Christmas cliffhanger.

== Storylines ==
Damo first arrived to the hospital when he purchased Kylie Brown's (Kerry-Lee Dewing) dress online believing it to instead be a date and resulting in him being rebuffed. Damo later appeared when as Head of the IT department, he vindictively changed hospital CEO Chris Warner (Michael Galvin) passwords before backing down after mistakenly believing Chris' best friend Mo (Jarrod Rawiri) was a gang member. Several months later Damo moved into Esther Samuels (Ngahuia Piripi), Lucy Rickman (Grace Palmer) and Ali Karim's (Tane Williams) flat and confused many with his strange hobbies and quest for love. Damo clashed dramatically with elder hospital receptionist Leanne Black (Jennifer Ludlam) especially when she received a promotion, making him accountable to her. Leanne set up Damo with a patient's daughter Erin (Kayleigh Haworth) but following her mother's death, she left Damo. After months of connecting through shared loneliness, Damo realised he was in love with Leanne and despite her reservations, she too fell in love and the two became a secret couple. The relationship was short lived when Damo pushed a pregnant Lucy during an earthquake but came round to eventually loving her child when Lucy died from childbirth, making him want to father a child himself. The return of Erin saw her relationship with Damo rekindle much to Leanne's jealousy, leading to her spitefully revealing Erin was unable to have children. However it soon became apparent Erin was psychotic when she kidnapped Damo and attacked both Ali and Leanne. This resulted in Damo and Leanne reuniting and committing to raising a child together eventually. Whilst Leanne was overseas, Damo was shocked to be diagnosed with bowel cancer and eventually opted to have surgery, removing the disease. Erin soon returned to Ferndale and revealed her pregnancy to Damo, and a custody arrangement was organised where their son, Donny would spend time with Damo and Leanne. Damo shocked Drew McCaskill (Ben Barrington) when he revealed he was secretly very wealthy and bought into co-ownership of the IV Bar.

Damo and Leanne got engaged in 2019 but briefly separated when considering retirement home living. The two exchanged consonants in an unofficial ceremony dressed in the couple's favourite fantasy roleplaying characters in their IV bar courtyard. However, when Damo lost the bar gambling, and Leanne's first-love Willy Marsh (Jim Moriarty) confessed his love to her, the couple broke up and Leanne fled New Zealand. Whilst trying to stop an armed robbery, Damo was shot and required a liver transplant. Drew volunteered and during Damo's subsequent recovery, he started a relationship with Leanne's rival Desdemona Schmidt (Kura Forrester). Leanne returned several months later and confessed her love for Damo, but he announced that he had moved on. Following the death of his father, Damo underwent severe depressive episodes and suffered suicidal thoughts, to the point where he nearly jumped off a bridge into heavy traffic. Leanne helped him through and he used his newfound understanding of loss to help Louis King (Henry Rolleston) when he too lost his father. At the end of the year, Damo would end up being assaulted by a drunk Desi, but the two reconcile after talking things out.

In 2021, Damo is confronted by an old face from the past named Craig, who used to bully him in high school. He is afraid of him to the point where he runs into the bottom of the elevator (which was broken down) and starts doing fitness regimes believing that he is unfit. He learns Craig has stage 3 cancer and the two begin to get along as Damo supports him with his treatment. Damo's love for Desdemona is challenged as therapist Carla Summerfield (Crozier) returns and he develops feelings for Carla. He starts having wet dreams about her and eventually the two kiss in front of Desdemona, who dumps him. Damo tries to stay away from Carla, but fails to do so. He and Carla had to pretend to be a couple so Nicole would believe that Carla is not attracted to her sexually (which fails).

In 2022, he married Desi in an elaborate drag wedding, after Desi was swindled into a wedding reality show, hired Wilder as an IT intern, but cheated on Desi with Leanne on Dawn's farewell party.

On 20 July 2022, an entire episode was dedicated into his mind that euphemistically depicted his demise. He was in a coma after he was hit by a bus, initially not noticing he had head injures. This also propped up two other patients: DJ, which represented his youth, and John Heath, Damo's future had he not given up drinking and further damaged his liver. DJ and John Heath bled out due to his liver wound from Drew's transplant rupturing. Damo's head injuries deteriorated into a brain haemorrhage, and John Heath needing defibrillation, until Damo's soul decided to join Ali and Tess in a one-way bus into the afterlife, but the episode ended with the true extent of injures were revealed: Brain bleed, liver damage after the fall and bleeding from the right knee.

On the next episode, the true extent was known: bilateral tibia and fibia fracture, rib fractures, hip fractures, but then developed into haemothorax. His subdural haematoma was initially not operated upon due to its small size, but it developed into a Cushing's Triad. He survived the operation, but 5 days later, after he dropped off sedation completely, he only showed abnormal reflex, which mean he is still in a coma. He stayed at the hospital for a further month, but was moved to a long-term care facility on August 7 after much disagreement from Desi.

After awakening from his coma in October 2022, Damo and Desi would leave Shortland Street to help him recover. A recovered Damo and Desi made a brief return for the 2023 finale, attending a New Year’s Eve boat party hosted by Chris Warner.

== Character development ==
=== Characterisation ===
The New Zealand TV Guide described the character as "socially awkward, over-confident and unlucky-in-love". Damo was written as primarily a comic relief character which pleased Lobban who came from a comedy background, describing Damo as "the clown". He believed "The comedy is very natural to me", and had no dramatic training leading him to think that, "With comedy you can do anything and it doesn't have to be believable, just funny, whereas serious subjects ... you are quite conscious of making it look as real as possible." Co-star Luke Patrick (Frank Warner coached Lobban to act out Damo's dramatic scenes. Damo was said to be a "coward" after a storyline saw him push a pregnant Lucy Rickman (Grace Palmer) during an earthquake, something Lobban said proved the difference between himself and his character, "I know I am not Damo, I just didn't feel comfortable being this coward."

=== Bowel cancer ===
In an attempt to raise awareness of startling bowel cancer diagnosis rates in New Zealand, advertising agency TBWA approached Television New Zealand to feature a storyline that saw the cancer affect one of the characters. It was decided that the character of Damo would undergo the cancer storyline due to the belief from the campaigns Chief Executive that, "Working with such a well-loved character gave people a reason to care: it means a huge portion of the population now has a friend who has experienced bowel cancer. That provided great traction we can draw upon to educate Kiwis about this disease, which affects so people, but which still flies under the radar." It was believed that the comedic nature of the Damo character would be a suitable medium to convey the wide-reaching nature of the cancer and Lobban believed Damo was an obvious target for such a disease as, "He's an unhealthy eater. He's always got those junk-food wrappers on his desk. He's just an unhealthy, disgusting guy." Over a three-week period, Damo was shown to undergo the symptoms of bowel cancer, but actively ignore them and turn them into "toilet-humour" based jokes. Bowel Cancer New Zealand actively consulted Shortland Street on how best to portray the symptoms, testing, diagnosis, surgery, and aftermath. The episodes were also accompanied by warning's suggesting the "disease could strike anyone". Lobban enjoyed the storyline and thought overall that the, "message, of course, being check yourself early and you can survive these things."

== Reception ==
Damo was hugely popular with the public, and critics alike. His first appearances were well received online with Shorty Street Scandal satirically named Damo and Kylie as the "Hookup of the week". The Spinoff writer Tara Ward gave him the "Shortland Street power ranking" of number 1 of the week, calling the character "batshit crazy" and suggesting the show was better for it. She concluded her review by suggesting, "Damo for Prime Minister". The character of Damo was so popular, he was purposefully chosen to undertake his prostate cancer storyline as it was believed this would be the most effective measure to impact such an issue to the audience. Lobban was not prepared for the amount of affection audiences would have for his character and noted one particular incident where he thought he was going to be assaulted by a motorbike driver but was instead unexpectedly applauded for his portrayal. Lobban's co-star Tane Williams (Ali Karim) praised Damo as "just ridiculous" and thought working with the actor was, "just so crazy that it's hard to stay in the scene and hold it together when they are cracking some of their ridiculous jokes." Damo's guest reappearance during the 2023 Christmas cliffhanger was noted as a return, "of a few favourite faces – and they chose a few of the best."
