= Marty Walker (Shortland Street) =

- Shortland Street character
- Portrayed by: Scott Smart
- Duration: 2019–
- First appearance: 2 December 2019
- Introduced by: Maxine Fleming
In-universe information
- Occupation: Doctor at Shortland Street Hospital (2019—)
- Father: Graham Walker
- Wife: Lisa Hurley (Until 2019); Esther Samuels (2023—)
- Sons: Potiki Walker
- Daughters: Chloe Walker
- Stepsons: Kiwa Adams
- Stepdaughters: Pikitia Hannah

Marty Walker is a fictional character on the New Zealand soap opera Shortland Street who has been portrayed by Scott Smart since December 2019.

== Creation and casting ==
The character of Marty was created as a core-cast member who would have a large role in the 2019 Christmas cliffhanger. Scott Smart auditioned for the character having recently returned from Australia, and winning the role, started filming in October 2019. Smart had previously appeared in various episodes of Shortland Street throughout 2008 and 2009 as Jared Fisher, a classmate of Sophie McKay (Kimberley Crossman). Initial storylines scripted for Marty were to depict him as a "devoted" doctor who, having lost his wife to a mysterious strain of influenza, was dedicated to uncovering the cause of the illness; in what coincidentally echoed the outbreak of COVID-19 at the time. The character debuted on-screen in December, and was labelled as "Shortland Street's answer to McDreamy from Grey's Anatomy." The character was portrayed as a "hero" and a "pretty face", with Smart describing Marty as "Loyal and Hardworking". However Smart believed there were "layers" to be explored in Marty and that "The over dedication, the exhaustion, the shift work, the over investment, I think, is something that seems to be common among all the doctors and nurses I know ... So I think that side of it, the level of investment is an interesting thing that the writers are exploring."

== Storylines ==
Arriving to Shortland Street Hospital in December 2019 as an Emergency Department (ED) patient, he immediately accepted a job offer from CEO Chris Warner (Michael Galvin) after impressively helping out during a in-flux of sickness; much to the frustration of fellow doctor Ben King (Jamie Irvine). Marty quickly gained the attraction of the Nursing staff, predominantly that of Nicole (Sally Martin) and Dawn (Rebekah Randell). Investigating a large spate of mysterious flu-cases coming into the hospital, it soon turned out Marty's wife Lisa had recently died from a similar illness and he had been obsessively trying to determine the cause. Lisa's sister Bridget (Hannah Martin) arrived and confessed her love, leading a disgruntled Marty to discover he had fallen for Nicole and kiss her, embarrassingly realising she was dating Maeve Mullens (Jess Sayer). With the help of Dawn, Marty tracked the mysterious flu symptoms to a polluted rural water source and when Dawn was hospitalised after catching the virus, the two began dating.

Marty and Dawn moved in together, and began to discuss children despite her obvious love for flatmate Prince Kimiora (Jay Kiriona). The arrival of Marty's father Graham (Nigel Godfrey) provided a much needed family link; and when Graham started dating Nicole's mother Leanne (Jennifer Ludlam), the family-unit expanded before Graham tragically suffered a heart attack and died. Eventually breaking up with Dawn, Marty started flatting with Esther Samuels (Ngahuia Piripi) with whom he struck up a strong friendship, whilst having a short-lived romance with model Monique Strutter (Courtenay Louise). Marty moved back to his old flat after realising he had fallen in love with Esther, he had a brief reconciliation with Dawn before he started sleeping with new flatmate Samira Moradi (Roxie Mohebbi). Samira convinced Marty to move to Australia with her, but he broke her heart after opting to stay in Ferndale and confess his love to Esther.

Despite some months of bliss with Marty, Esther's crush on Rahu Parata (Zak Martin) over the Matariki celebrations made her realise Marty could not give her the Maori culture she needed in her life, and they broke up. Marty reconciled with a recently returned Monique and progressed up the ladder at work. Despite a drunken one-night stand with Esther, Marty proposed to Monique. Learning Esther was pregnant, Marty devastated Monique by leaving her and reuniting with the mother of his soon-to-be child, proposing to her instead. The two married in a Summer ceremony in early 2023. Esther's ongoing heart-problems proved troublesome for the unborn child and Marty was forced to choose to terminate the pregnancy to save an unconscious Esther. Naming their unborn son 'Potiki', upon waking Esther refused to forgive Marty and left to reconcile her grief. Marty bonded with a dying patients teenage son Milo Cross (Ben Porter) but taking steps to help him with his violent behaviour resulted in Milo swearing revenge on Marty. He went on a shooting spree in the hospital, shooting 6 people before killing himself in front of Marty. Marty was diagnosed with post-traumatic stress disorder and began taking anxiety medication. Reconciling with Esther, the two learned to accept the grief of losing Potiki, and committed to raising Esther's 2 other children together.

Discovering wonder-drug Zeclastion and the beneficial effect it had on his anxiety, Marty began to experiment with doses before realising he had developed a horrific addiction to the drug. With help from Esther, he went to rehab before returning and again succumbing to stronger doses of the drug and dramatically overdosing at Chris' New Years Eve party. After a more successful stint in rehab, Marty returned to Shortland Street but transferred to the Paedriatics Unit after recognising the drug cravings he experienced from the rush of ED.

== Reception ==
Marty was said to be a "popular" character, with his compassionate characterisation proving a hit with fans. The storyline in which Marty debuted concerned a "Mystery Virus" and involved him investigating the "flu-like symptoms" that resulted in characters requiring isolation, staff wearing PPE and ventilation being required for victims. Written in 2019, the scenes aired to audiences during the real-life COVID-19 pandemic and resulting in a nationwide lockdown. This was described as the "Shortland Street curse", with producer Maxine Fleming believing, "Shortland Street is always tuned in to the real world and the potential threats and challenges our cast of medical characters may face and be forced to overcome together ... Sometimes we come eerily close to pre-empting such real-life events". The disease was later shown on-screen to be caused by the water supply being poisoned with anthrax, rather than an airborne virus like COVID-19.
