= List of Shortland Street characters introduced in 2022 =

The following is a list of characters that first appeared in the New Zealand soap opera Shortland Street in 2022, by order of first appearance.

== Pikitia Hannah ==
Pikitia Hannah
- Shortland Street character
- Portrayed by: Lily Mete (2022); Valerie Dawn Maea (2022—)
- Duration: 2022—
- First appearance: 21 January 2022
- Introduced by: Oliver Driver
- Spin-off appearances: Shortland Street: Retribution (2021)
In-universe information
- Father: Curtis Hannah
- Mother: Esther Samuels
- Half-brothers: Kiwa Adams; Potiki Walker
- Grandfathers: Paora Samuels; Mo Hannah
- Grandmothers: Kahu Samuels; Margaret Hannah
- Uncles: Jack Hannah
- Aunts: Anahera Samuels; Pixie Hannah
- Other relatives: Kuini Samuels; Huia Samuels; TK Samuels; Tillie Samuels

Pikitia is the daughter to the late Curtis Hannah and his partner Esther Samuels born during the spin off show Shortland Street: Retribution

== Lovely Rivera ==
Lovely Rivera
- Shortland Street character
- Portrayed by: Charisse Uy
- Duration: 2022–2023
- First appearance: 17 February 2022
- Last appearance: 2 March 2023
- Introduced by: Oliver Driver
In-universe information
- Occupation: Nurse

Lovely Rivera appeared as a recurring character throughout 2022 to 2023.

Lovely arrived as a new temp nurse at the hospital and surprised her childhood best friend Madonna (Marianne Infante). Swiftly moving in with Madonna and her daughter Joy (Athena Matthews), Lovely made an impression in Ferndale and grew attracted to TK Samuels (Benjamin Mitchell). However Lovely and Madonna soon fell out when she drunkenly admitted to having an affair with Madonna's husband Samson. Lovely continued sporadically at the hospital throughout the year, eventually reconciling albeit never-as-close with Madonna.

Madonna was shocked when she discovered Lovely was dating gang member Taz Brooker (Niwa Whatuira). Despite Lovely being in love, Madonna pressured her to leave Taz due to his gang's violent nature. Lovely later quit nursing after a staffing shortage saw her forced into ED, where her inexperience caused the death of a patient.

Following a bar fight early in 2023, Lovely was stabbed by Taz and after narrowly surviving surgery, she discovered she was pregnant. Desperate to abort so to dissociate herself with Taz, Lovely found herself encouraged to keep the baby by the new Church management of the hospital, alongside Madonna enforcing a new anti-abortion policy. Sometime later Lovely was admitted to the hospital having attempted to perform an abortion on herself. Forced to undergo a total hysterectomy, Lovely survived but permanently ended her friendship with Madonna due to her judgement on the issue.

== Rahu Parata ==
Rahu Parata
- Shortland Street character
- Portrayed by: Zak Martin
- Duration: 2022–2024
- First appearance: 25 May 2022
- Last appearance: 5 February 2024
- Introduced by: Oliver Driver
In-universe information
- Occupation: Emergency Department Doctor
- Brothers: Awatea Parata
- First cousins: Desdemona Schmidt
- Other relatives: Angel Schmidt

Rahu Parata featured as a regular character from 2022 until the characters death in late 2023. His corpse appeared on-screen in 2024. He was introduced during the show's 30th anniversary as a potential love interest for established character Esther Samuels (Ngahuia Piripi).

Rahu arrived to Ferndale to attend cousin Desi's (Kura Forrester) wedding to Damo (Grant Lobban). Instantly sparking a connection with Esther, he departed only to return over the Matariki weekend and after being rejected at the airport due to parking ticket fines, end up winning a job at the hospital. Rahu soon emerged as a womaniser and shortly after romancing Ngaio Wira (Trae Te Wiki), started dating her niece Gia Te Atakura (Awa Puna). However, after some hesitations in the relationship due to Rahu's reluctance at Gia being transgender, she left him. A short lived romance with Nicole (Sally Martin) led to the revelation that Rahu had syphilis and had spread it throughout the Nursing department. Rahu soon fell for Stella Reihana (Tatum Warren-Ngata) but this sparked a rivalry with her ex-boyfriend Harry (Xander Manktelow). As the year ended, Rahu uncovered that Harry had faked his surgical qualifications, but before he could reveal this, was stabbed repeatedly by a patient. Stepping in to undertake the live-saving surgery, Harry purposely sabotaged the procedure; killing Rahu and burying his secret.

Fans were reportedly "devastated" when Rahu was killed in the 2023 Christmas cliffhanger.

== Logan Barns ==
Logan Barns
- Shortland Street character
- Portrayed by: Carlos Muller
- Duration: 2022—
- First appearance: 26 May 2022
- Introduced by: Oliver Driver
In-universe information
- Occupation: Paramedic
- Sisters: Daisy Barns

Logan Barns appeared in a recurring role since 2022, portrayed by Carlos Muller.

== Cassie Lloyd ==
Cassie Lloyd
- Shortland Street character
- Portrayed by: Megg Alexander
- Duration: 2022—
- First appearance: 30 August 2022
- Introduced by: Oliver Driver
In-universe information
- Mother: Justine Lloyd
- Sons: Knox Lloyd-Mullens

== Ngaio Wira ==
Ngaio Wira
- Shortland Street character
- Portrayed by: Trae Te Wiki
- Duration: 2022–23
- First appearance: 14 September 2022
- Last appearance: 15 September 2023
- Introduced by: Oliver Driver
In-universe information
- Father: Apirana Wira
- Half-brothers: TK Samuels
- Nieces: Gia Te Atakura; Tillie Samuels

Ngaio is the half-sister of TK Samuels, whom he never knew existed until she made a dramatic entrance by gatecrashing his wedding to Cece King. Since her arrival in Ferndale, Ngaio quickly integrated herself into the Samuels family home. She struck up a friendship with TK’s daughter Tillie Samuels but created tension with her niece Esther Samuels.

Ngaio and TK’s relationship became strained after the death of their father, as the siblings clashed over the terms of his will. With Ngaio having a "only-child energy and a lot of privilege

== Rebekah Anderson ==
Rebekah Anderson
- Shortland Street character
- Portrayed by: Antonia Prebble
- Duration: 2022–2023
- First appearance: 14 October 2022
- Last appearance: 17 March 2023
- Introduced by: Oliver Driver
In-universe information
- Occupation: Chief Executive Officer of Shortland Street Hospital (2023); Leader of Brightshine church (until 2023)

Rebekah Anderson appeared in a recurring role from 2022 to 2023, portrayed by Antonia Prebble. The character was written for Prebble, with complete flexibility allowed for filming to ensure her availability. Prebble was initially unaware her character would be an antagonist, but critics soon had named her as one of the soap's "most devious killers".

== Ranger Harrison ==
Ranger Harrison
- Shortland Street character
- Portrayed by: Phoebe Dando
- Duration: 2022
- First appearance: 12 December 2022
- Last appearance: 14 December 2022
- Introduced by: Oliver Driver
In-universe information
- Father: Nick Harrison
- Mother: Waverley Harrison
- Brothers: Camry Harrison
- Sisters: Tina-Anne Harrison; Celica Harrison; Silvia Harrison
- Half-brothers: Lucas Harrison
- Grandfathers: Barry Harrison; John Wilson
- Grandmothers: Jenny Harrison; Trish Wilson
- Uncles: Stratford Wilson
- Aunts: Amberley Wilson
- Other relatives: Rachel McKenna; Jonathon McKenna

Ranger Harrison appeared across several episodes in December 2022. First mentioned through dialogue in 2017, Ranger was the daughter of long running characters Nick (Karl Burnett) and Waverley Harrison (Claire Chitham).

Revealed to be an influencer family, the Harrisons went camping in the Ferndale forest over Christmas 2022 where Waverley live-streamed their experience. Failing to properly extinguish their campfire, the forest caught alight and started a serious wildfire resulting in multiple fatalities. Ranger visited hospital alongside her family following smoke inhalation.

== Camry Harrison ==
Camry Harrison
- Shortland Street character
- Portrayed by: Jackson Dando
- Duration: 2022
- First appearance: 13 December 2022
- Last appearance: 14 December 2022
- Introduced by: Oliver Driver
In-universe information
- Father: Nick Harrison
- Mother: Waverley Harrison
- Sisters: Tina-Anne Harrison; Celica Harrison; Silvia Harrison; Ranger Harrison
- Half-brothers: Lucas Harrison
- Grandfathers: Barry Harrison; John Wilson
- Grandmothers: Jenny Harrison; Trish Wilson
- Uncles: Stratford Wilson
- Aunts: Amberley Wilson
- Other relatives: Rachel McKenna; Jonathon McKenna

Camry Harrison appeared across several episodes in December 2022. First mentioned through dialogue in 2017, Camry was the son of long running characters Nick (Karl Burnett) and Waverley Harrison (Claire Chitham).

Revealed to be an influencer family, the Harrisons went camping in the Ferndale forest over Christmas 2022 where Waverley live-streamed their experience. Failing to properly extinguish their campfire, the forest caught alight and started a serious wildfire resulting in multiple fatalities. Camry visited hospital alongside his family following smoke inhalation.

== Silvia Harrison ==
Silvia Harrison
- Shortland Street character
- Portrayed by: Willow Dando
- Duration: 2022
- First appearance: 12 December 2022
- Last appearance: 14 December 2022
- Introduced by: Oliver Driver
In-universe information
- Father: Nick Harrison
- Mother: Waverley Harrison
- Brothers: Camry Harrison
- Sisters: Tina-Anne Harrison; Celica Harrison; Ranger Harrison
- Half-brothers: Lucas Harrison
- Grandfathers: Barry Harrison; John Wilson
- Grandmothers: Jenny Harrison; Trish Wilson
- Uncles: Stratford Wilson
- Aunts: Amberley Wilson
- Other relatives: Rachel McKenna; Jonathon McKenna

Silvia Harrison appeared across several episodes in December 2022. First mentioned through dialogue in 2017, Silvia was the youngest daughter of long running characters Nick (Karl Burnett) and Waverley Harrison (Claire Chitham).

Whilst visiting Ferndale for Chris Warner's (Michael Galvin) 50th birthday, Waverley and Nick were shocked to discover they were expecting another child. Longtime family friend Marj Brasch (Elizabeth McRae) encouraged them to embrace the pregnancy shortly before she died. In 2022, the now 5-year old Silvia and the Harrisons went camping in the Ferndale forest over Christmas 2022 where Waverley live-streamed their experience. Failing to properly extinguish their campfire, the forest caught alight and started a serious wildfire resulting in multiple fatalities. Silvia visited hospital alongside her family following smoke inhalation.

== Milo Cross ==
Milo Cross
- Shortland Street character
- Portrayed by: Ben Porter
- Duration: 2022–2023
- First appearance: 15 December 2022
- Last appearance: 27 October 2023
- Introduced by: Oliver Driver
In-universe information
- Mother: Annabel Cross

Milo Cross appeared as a recurring character from late-2022 in a 6-month guest role. Milo first arrived to the hospital as the victim of the Ferndale bush fires, where his father was killed. In the aftermath of the fire, Milo befriended TK Samuels' (Benjamin Mitchell) daughter Tillie (Tinihuia Lee-Lemon), and led her astray. The two got involved in a ram raid which saw Tillie hospitalised, and when TK confronted him, Milo assaulted him and left him for dead; recording the incident. Milo returned to the hospital with his very sick mother Annabel (Kylie Cushman) and when she suddenly died, Milo took out a vendetta on her doctor Marty (Scott Smart). Milo was arrested when he assaulted Rahu Parata (Zak Martin) and was put into rehabilitation to sort his anger issues.

Milo returned some months later and frustrated TK and Marty, when Rahu took him in, began mentoring him and channeled his anger into boxing. However his lingering bitterness toward Marty escalated and he snuck into the hospital with a gun, shooting several staff members, paralysing TK, and killing Quinn Cox (Clementine Mills). When attempting to kill Marty, Marty insulted and mocked Milo for his shortcomings, letting out his anger and hatred for Milo who then opted to shoot himself, leaving Marty with post-traumatic stress disorder at having witnessed his death. Several months later, Marty hallucinated a vision of Milo in his distress.

Porter found an array of audience responses to the character, believing "I think that Milo’s struggles are pretty relatable to some degree, but it’s pretty obvious that he is going about it the completely wrong way." The reaction to the character allegedly resulted in Porter's personal car being targeted and vandalised.
