= Gia Te Atakura =

- Shortland Street character
- Awa Puna as Gia Te Atakura (2023)
- Portrayed by: CJ Reinecke (2017); Awa Puna (2022–)
- Duration: 2017, 2022—
- First appearance: 22 June 2017
- Introduced by: Maxine Fleming & Oliver Driver (2017); Oliver Driver (2022, 2024)
- Gia as she first appeared as "Sid Du Toit" in 2017 portrayed by CJ Reinecke
In-universe information
- Father: TK Samuels
- Mother: Joy Du Toit
- Half-sisters: Tillie Samuels
- Grandfathers: Apirana Wira
- Grandmothers: Liz Arthur
- Uncles: Luke Whakapono
- Aunts: Ngaio Wira
- First cousins: Ezra Whakapono
- Other relatives: Esther Samuels; Kuini Samuels; Huia Samuels; Wiremu Potae; Tane Samuels

Gia Te Atakura (previously Sidney "Sid" Du Toit) is a fictional character in New Zealand's longest-running soap opera Shortland Street, played by actress Awa Puna since 2022. The character was played by CJ Reinecke under the name Sid Dutoit in 2017.

== Creation and casting ==
The character of Sidney Du Toit first appeared for a guest appearance in 2017, departing the show in July. The role was reintroduced in 2022 with the character being written as transgender, and Awa Puna being cast. She believed, "It was cool to see a representation of a trans person who has so many layers" and wasn't just a “sassy soundboard” like how transgender character were often portrayed in media. Gia first appeared on 24 November. Puna enjoyed the stability the show provided her as an actress, "I’ve been so lucky to have regular work over the past couple of years. It’s so hard as an actor to get that." The character departed the following year, with Puna unsure whether Gia would return to the soap.

In 2024, Puna was contacted by Shortland Street producers to return to the show. Head Writer Jessica Joy Wood believed the character had become a, "key part of the bones of Shortland Street, and it’s brilliant to watch Awa grow and shape the character. Awa’s talent has allowed us to really push Gia this season ... She’s such a fabulous actress and we’re super excited to see where we can take the character". Puna was "thrilled" to be asked to return, and to have bilingual scripts, “I’m extremely lucky to be able to do that and happy that I get to play a role that includes speaking in Te Reo Māori. Having that representation on-screen is so important." Gia returned on-screen on 15 August 2024.

== Storylines ==
Sid Dut Toit was admitted to Shortland Street Hospital after collapsing during a paramedic callout in June 2017. His Doctor Esther Samuels (Ngahuia Piripi) was impressed by Sid following his diagnosis of a cardiac issue, due to a dedication to sport despite his heart limitations. Much to Esther's ex-boyfriend Finn Warner's (Lukas Whiting) annoyance, she bonded over her heart complications with Sid, developing a romantic interest. Esther's uncle TK Samuels (Benjamin Mitchell) took a liking to Sid and encouraged his healthy lifestyle. However, when Sid's mother Joy became aware of TK's relation to Esther she halted any progression of the relationship, eventually revealing that Esther and Sid were in fact related as he was TK's son from a one-night stand. TK was shocked to discover this but instead of informing Sid, let him move overseas to pursue a rowing career without having to worry about his father. TK later heard Sid was in Australia fighting wildfires.

Following his diagnosis of prostate cancer, TK decided to reach out to Sid in November 2022 and reveal their relation, but was devastated to hear from Joy that Sid had in fact died 2 years prior. However several weeks later, new doctor at the hospital Gia Te Atakura (Awa Puna) revealed herself as Sid, having come-out as transgender and being disowned by Joy when she transitioned to a woman. Hesitant to welcome her biological father into her life, Gia started to date Rahu Parata (Zak Martin) and faced discriminatory transphobia from new CEO Rebekah Anderson (Antonia Prebble) who tried to send her to a hospital in Chicago due to her gender identity. Gia finally accepted TK as her father when he revealed he was in remission from cancer and was devastated when Rahu began to succumb to transphobic rants from his brother Awatea (Kieran Foster), leading to a break up. Still in love with Rahu but not willing to forgive, Gia opted to take the job opportunity in Chicago and departed Ferndale. Rahu visited her later in the year.

Gia returned to the hospital in mid 2024 and immediately clashed with colleague Chris Warner (Michael Galvin) due to his son Harry's (Xander Manktelow) involvement in the murder of Rahu. Outraged at the abandonment of the hospital's "Maori and Pasifika Clinic" (MPC) due to Government policy, Gia worked alongside Chris, Esther, and Sage (Peter Burman) to operate the clinic secretly.

== Character development ==
Gia underwent storylines that explored her transgender identity, alongside ethical issues such as Maori and Pacifika representation in the health system. Puna described her as "layered" and was happy to explore themes about what it means to be transgender, “It reflects a world that actually does exist.” Described as "passionate and principled", Gia was characterised as "resilient" with Puna noting she was "extremely headstrong with a backbone that goes straight down into the ground. She is a strong pou ... she comes in like Hurricane Katrina." The character's fierce advocacy for Te Reo Maori was a point of pride for Puna, alongside the strong Maori presence onscreen, "It’s cool to have quite a few characters speaking te reo, and so many people [on set] who are kaitiaki (guardians), or who tautoko (support) us.”

== Reception ==
The arrival of Gia in 2022 was named as a highlight of Shortland Street by The Spinoff, noting the "serious storyline" involving the supposed death of Sid, and reveal of Gia. Puna thought portraying Gia on Shortland Street enabled her to be a role-model to younger audiences, "I looked up to a lot of people when I was trying to figure out who I was and now I’ve become that person to others."
