= List of Shortland Street characters introduced in 2017 =

Shortland Street is a New Zealand television soap opera. It was first broadcast on 25 May 1992 and currently airs on television network TVNZ 2. The following is a list of characters that appeared on the show in 2017 by order of first appearance. All characters are introduced by the show's executive producer Maxine Fleming. The 25th season of Shortland Street began airing on 16 January 2017 and concluded on 18 December 2017.

== Mason Coutts ==
Mason Coutts
- Shortland Street character
- Portrayed by: Colin Moy
- First appearance: January 2017
- Last appearance: 18 December 2017
- Introduced by: Maxine Fleming
In-universe information
- Occupation: Mayor
- Brothers: James Coutts; Ray Coutts
- Wife: Alison Coutts; Sass Connelly (2017)
- Sons: Jasper Coutts
- Uncles: Raymond Coutts
- Aunts: Joyce Coutts

Mason Coutts, played by Colin Moy, made his first appearance in January 2017. Mason is Moy's third role on the show, having played David in 1995 and Brett Valentine in 2004.

Mason is introduced as a new candidate for the role being Mayor of Ferndale. It later emerges that he is the father of troubled teen Jasper Coutts (Lachlan Forlong). He then meets Sass Connelly (Lucy Lovegrove) and the pair start a relationship much to the dislike of her half brother, Harry Warner (Reid Walker). Mason later moves Jasper to Ferndale High after being expelled from his previous school, St. Barts. Sass starts to assist with Mason's campaign for Mayor with her attending events alongside him frequently. Their relationship becomes physical and the two sleep together. After having sex, Sass falls asleep. While she is asleep Mason makes a suspicious phonecall on a separate phone. Later on, Mason wins the campaign to become the Mayor of Ferndale and during celebrations it is revealed that Mason was arranging the murder and burial of corrupt Detective Brent Cochrane underneath the foundation of a new building. Soon after, the pair marry, much to the dismay of Sass's family. Their relationship takes a turn when Sass starts to annoy Mason's long time love affair who acts as his assistant. Sass becomes upset when Mason dismisses her, but he re-assures her that everything is OK. Eventually, it is revealed that Mason is the criminal mastermind behind the death of Glenn Rickman (Will Wallace) and covering up the murder of Hayden Crowhurst (Aaron Jackson). Due to Mason's shady personality, TK Samuels (Benjamin Mitchell) starts to become suspicious of Mason. On the day of a volcanic eruption in Ferndale, Mason and Sass have a violent fight at their house. Sass hides from Mason, but he waits for her to come out. Sass later sees her brother Frank Warner (Luke Patrick) laying on the floor and thinks he may be dead. Angry, Sass grabs a knife and stabs him. Sass's friend Hawks Logan (Teone Kahu) turns up and comforts Sass. Mason begs Sass for help, but Sass refuses. Shortly afterwards, Frank wakes up and it is revealed he is not dead and Mason is treated for his injuries in Hospital. Mason is later sent to prison for his corrupt activity. In prison, he sends a gunman to shoot Frank and Sass's other brother Finn Connelly (Lukas Whiting) whilst Mason is on a boat with Jasper and Sass trapped after he escapes prison. They argue on board and Mason goes to throw Sass abroad but is interrupted by Jasper and gets injured. He suffers from his injuries and dies in Mason's arms. Mason blames Sass for his sons death and the pair have a physical struggle, Mason pulls Sass into the water and he reveals to her he sent a gunman to kill her family. Mason drowns and the boat sails away, leaving Sass in the ocean treading water.

== Eve Reston ==
Eve Reston
- Shortland Street character
- Portrayed by: Jess Holly Bates
- Duration: 2017–2018, 2020-2021
- First appearance: 16 February 2017
- Last appearance: 3 February 2021
- Introduced by: Maxine Fleming
In-universe information
- Occupation: Oncologist
- Sons: Romulus Rolleston-Reston; Remus Rolleston-Reston

Eve Reston, played by Jess Holly Bates, made her first screen appearance on 17 February 2017.

Unlucky in-love Boyd Rolleston (Sam Bunkall) was convinced to use a dating app by friend Drew McCaskill (Ben Barrington), and he was shocked when his one-night stand Eve was revealed as a new brain surgeon at the hospital. Adamant she was after a solely sexual relationship as she did not want to develop feelings, she propositioned Boyd to father children with her to create a perfect baby. Ultimately the two fell in love much to Eve's angst and she fell pregnant with twins. The hospital staff were shocked when deceased patient bodies started going missing and Eve lead speculation toward Deb Randal (Gabrielle Henderson) who was a recovering drug addict. Boyd began to notice suspicious behaviour in Eve and when following her one-day, discovered she was the body-snatcher, operating on the bodies out of her father's property where she was storing his brain. She sought to find medical miracles through researching dead patients. Eve pleaded with Boyd to keep her secret for their children's sake, but shortly after giving birth to their twin boys Remus and Romulus, she fled the country taking the babies with her.

In September 2018, Eve returned to Ferndale with her babies and pleaded with Boyd to operate as Romulus was ill. Boyd illegally organised the operation and operated on his son under an alias. Eve again fled the country but gave Boyd her contact details to ensure his children were safe. This was later rescinded when Boyd revealed this information to his policewoman girlfriend. In June 2020 Remus and Romulus were dropped to Boyd by a lawyer who informed him Eve was giving him full custody.

Eve later returned at the end of the year and abducted the twins.

== Erin Landry ==
Erin Landry
- Shortland Street character
- Portrayed by: Kayleigh Haworth
- Duration: 2017, 2018, 2022
- First appearance: 20 March 2017
- Last appearance: 11 April 2022
- Introduced by: Maxine Fleming
In-universe information
- Occupation: Computing student
- Mother: Betty Landry
- Sons: Dongle Johnson

Erin Landry, played by Kayleigh Harworth, made her first appearance on 20 March 2017.

Erin is a PHD student, studying computers and the daughter of a patient named Betty. Noticing the head of the IT department Damo Johnson (Grant Lobban) was lonely, Leanne Miller (Jennifer Ludlam) set up Erin and him for a date. However the death of Betty lead Erin to accuse her doctor TK Samuels (Benjamin Mitchell) of ill-practice and dump Damo due to her unstable state. Erin returned several months later having secured an IT job at the hospital and resumed her relationship with Damo. However, when she discovered that Leanne and Damo had dated, she became incredibly manipulative, leading to Leanne leaking her health documents showing she was infertile. Ultimately Damo became uncomfortable with Erin but she kidnapped him, attacked Ali, and fought Leanne. She was arrested and found to be suffering from a psychotic mental illness. When she returned in 2018, and while she was apologizing to Leanne, she had abdominal pain. Initially thought to be feinting, Harper found out that she is actually in labour. When a baby boy was born, Damo was revealed to be the father. Leanne's stance softened when Erin became stricken with Postpartum depression. Leanne also confided in Nicole that Eric, Nicole's brother, became a schizophrenic, partly due to Leanne's neglect when she had her depression.

Erin returned again in 2022 and attempted to become close with Damo again while helping him track down an internet hacker known as "The Fiend", who had stolen Damo's savings. However, it was quickly revealed that Erin herself was The Fiend and she fled Ferndale, leaving her and Damo's son Donny in Damo's care.

== Dawn Robinson ==
Dawn Robinson
- Shortland Street character
- Portrayed by: Rebekah Randell
- Duration: 2017 – 2023, 2025—2026
- First appearance: 14 June 2017
- Last appearance: 17 November 2026
- Introduced by: Maxine Fleming (2017); Oliver Driver (2025, 2026)
In-universe information
- Occupation: Nurse
- Father: Bryce Robinson
- Mother: Jocelyn Robinson
- Aunts and uncles: Topp Twins (Aunts)

Dawn Joolinda Robinson, played by Rebekah Randell, made her first appearance on 14 June 2017. Dawn is a nurse and is portrayed as a cheerful, optimistic and wholesome person. She also is said to see the good in every situation of which her colleagues can find "alternately refreshing and extremely frustrating".

Dawn, the eager newbie got offside with Sass Warner (Lucy Lovegrove) with her inane chatter and continued references to her boyfriend Dave.

She had joined the Followers Cult, fell in and out of love with Ali, she is currently a nurse and was GP's assistant to Dylan Reinheart. However, since Dylan made a move on her, their working relationship became awkward. After she left the cult, she also briefly worked as a female companion to sugar daddies so she can earn extra money. After the first stint failed while Ali was away, she tried to do that again when Ali is recovering from brain cancer tumour removal surgery. In 2018, Bryce, Dawn's father, suffered a stroke, so he only managed to attend Dawn and Ali's wedding as the Topp Twins Jools and Linda Topp, as Dawn's middle name was named after them) were about to ask to marry. Ali died in April 2019, leaving Lulu with no birth parents, Dawn also became a widowed single step-parent.

She had a relationship with Marty, but in 2022, Dave, her first love returned for her, while she was about to leave to return to Cambridge and return to tend to the family farm, she was rushed back in July 2022 when Damo was badly injured when he was hit by a bus. She was stood down to scrub in as a backup surgical nurse. Dawn would end up dating and bedding Scott, a member of the cult Brightshine towards the end of 2022. After realising she wasn't in love with Scott, she would get together with Logan Barns (Carlos Mueller) which would lead to Scott attempting to strangle Logan with a bread bag. After Logan was resuscitated, Logan and Dawn would start 2023 looking for Dawn's dog Barry who would be found at the end of January. After months of doing very little, when Dawn's best friend Jack Hannah (Reuben Miller) decided to leave Ferndale, Dawn would first throw a tantrum and then decide to join Jack overseas, presumably quitting her job and dumping Logan in the process. It would be revealed, however that Dawn would return in mid-May that year.

On 10 November, 2025, Dawn returns to see Logan sitting on the couch, just as he tries to text to apologize to Poppy at Cleo's wake. After surviving a helicopter crash at the end of 2025, Dawn and Logan would move to Australia in February 2026. While Logan was recovering from his leg amputation at the end of July, he'd receive a phonecall from Dawn saying she was pregnant with his child. Dawn and Logan would appears as guests for Chris and Miriama Ropata (Maria Walker)'s wedding at the end of 2026.

== Joy Du Toit ==
Joy Du Toit
- Shortland Street character
- Portrayed by: Unknown actress (2017); Charmaine Guest (2025—)
- Duration: 2017, 2025
- First appearance: July 2017
- Last appearance: 25 June 2025
- Introduced by: Maxine Fleming (2017); Oliver Driver (2025)
In-universe information
- Husband: Mark Du Toit
- Daughters: Gia Te Atakura

Joy Du Toit has appeared in 2 different guest stints, portrayed by an unknown actress in 2017 and Charmaine Guest in 2025.

Joy arrived to Shortland Street Hospital in mid-2017 to visit her son Sid (CJ Reinecke), a dedicated rower who had been admitted with heart issues. When she noticed he was growing close toward Doctor Esther Samuels (Ngahuia Piripi) she immediately halted any progression of the relationship. Upset, Esther soon discovered that Joy was a university friend of her uncle TK Samuels (Benjamin Mitchell), and that Sid was actually his illegitimate son. Joy pled with TK to keep the secret for Sid's sake, and the two departed Ferndale.

Several years later, TK contacted Joy in an attempt to reveal the truth to Sid, only to learn he had died 2 year earlier. However TK soon discovered that the new Doctor at the hospital, Gia Te Atakura (Awa Puna) was in fact Sid - who had transitioned to a transgender woman and been disowned by Joy. Having no contact with her mother, Gia later revealed to her colleagues that Joy was a bitter alcoholic who chose her transphobic husband Mark, over Gia's transitioned life.

== Sebastian St. John ==
Sebastian St. John
- Shortland Street character
- Portrayed by: Thomas Sainsbury
- Duration: 2017–2018
- First appearance: 1 August 2017
- Last appearance: 27 September 2018
- Introduced by: Maxine Fleming

Sebastian St. John (formerly named Jason Kirkpatrick) appeared for 2 recurring stints from 2017 to 2018. Arriving as a new Health Care Assistant (HCA), Jason Kirkpatrick grew close to fellow HCA Jack Hannah (Reuben Milner) and Nurse Dawn Robinson (Rebekah Randell). It was immediately apparent that Jason was highly self conscious and made no secret of his desire to get dramatic plastic surgery when he could afford it. Surgeon Finn Warner (Lukas Whiting) had been appearing on breakfast television to promote the hospital but started receiving love letters that soon became apparent to be from a stalker titled, "Sexy Eyes". After Finn's partner Esther Samuels (Ngahuia Piripi) started to get targeted, Finn worked out Jason was the culprit and managed to save Esther from being mutilated after Jason had kidnapped her. He was arrested and put into psychiatric help.

The following year Jason returned under the new name, Sebastian St. John. He had been rehabilitated and was hired as a temporary replacement for Leanne Miller (Jennifer Ludlam) on the front desk.

The character was created as "a Psycho ... aggressive and scary" over a 2-week stint but once portrayed by Sainsbury, was reintroduced the following year as comedic relief due to his light-hearted interpretation for an additional 4-weeks.

== Zhilan Li ==
Zhilan Li
- Shortland Street character
- Portrayed by: Bridget Wong
- Duration: 2017
- First appearance: 4 October 2017
- Last appearance: 9 October 2017
- Introduced by: Maxine Fleming
In-universe information
- Husband: Harry Warner (2021—)
- Sons: Xun Warner

Zhilan Li appeared across several episodes in October 2017, played by Bridget Wong.

== Luke Whakapono ==
Luke Whakapono
- Shortland Street character
- Portrayed by: Tammy Davis
- Duration: 2017–2019
- First appearance: 20 November 2017
- Last appearance: 14 April 2018
- Introduced by: Maxine Fleming
In-universe information
- Occupation: Cult leader
- Mother: Liz Arthur
- Half-brothers: Paora Samuels; TK Samuels
- Sons: Ezra Whakapano
- Grandmothers: Mareikura Samuels
- Aunts: Kuini Samuels
- Nieces: Anahera Samuels; Esther Samuels; Gia Te Atakura; Tillie Potts
- First cousins: Huia Samuels

Luke Whakapono, played by Tammy Davis, made his first appearance in November 2017.

Upon Drew McCaskill (Ben Barrington) and Boyd Rolleston (Sam Bunkall) ending up lost in local bush and coming upon the cult followers, Luke is seen when his son Ezra screams about his father being "darkness". Ezra alleging that his father murdered one of his followers not long prior. When Hope, a member of Luke's cult is airlifted to the hospital, Luke ran into TK Samuels (Benjamin Mitchell), where it was revealed the two are half-brothers. Seemingly leaving peacefully once Ezra decides to stay with Drew and Boyd, Luke's manipulative nature is soon revealed when he attempts to force Hope to coax Ezra back to The Light. Ezra sends Hope back to the Followers, saying he has no interest in returning to his father. Infuriated by his son's disobedience. Luke disappears.

In the new year Luke returns and Dawn Robinson (Rebekah Palmer) decides to join The Light, wishing to turn her back on her previous life while not realising the true nature of the cult. Being hypnotised by Luke, Dawn returns to Ferndale where her odd behaviour is picked up on by her love interest, Ali Karim (Tane Williams-Accra). Dawn's mind control is eventually broken by her love for Ali and the two reconcile, infuriating Luke who then returns to trying to re-brainwash his son. Succeeding, TK goes to the Cult's compound where he confronts his brother about Ezra but is then drugged and brainwashed himself. Luke decides the time is right to enact his final plan, a slaughter of those the cult considers darkness, but before he can enact his plan, Drew and Boyd save TK and contact the police. While the police do nothing about Luke, Drew and Boyd escape with TK and leave. Luke is brought into hospital with a gunshot wound, inflicted by Ezra during an argument between the two. Despite the best efforts of the hospital's doctors, Luke dies from his wound. Seemingly from beyond the grave, Luke encourages his followers to commit suicide, succeeding in killing several members of the cult, while leaving Ezra, Dawn and TK still alive.

== Ezra Whakapono ==
Ezra Whakapono
- Shortland Street character
- Portrayed by: Dylan Poihipi
- Duration: 2017–2019
- First appearance: 20 November 2017
- Last appearance: 7 May 2019
- Introduced by: Maxine Fleming
In-universe information
- Father: Luke Whakapono
- Uncles: TK Samuels; Paora Samuels
- First cousins: Esther Samuels; Gia Te Atakura; Tillie Potts

Ezra Whakapono, played by Dylan Poihipi, made his first appearance in November 2017.

Boyd Rolleston (Sam Bunkall) and Drew McCaskill (Ben Barrington) discovered Ezra whilst lost tramping in the bush where he accused his father Luke Whakapono (Tammy Davis) of being "darkness". Ezra escaped the bush and it soon became apparent Luke was a cult leader, and TK's long-lost brother. Moving in with Drew and Boyd, Ezra struggled to adjust to life outside the cult but was supported through his flatmates and TK. However a romance with Dawn (Rebekah Randell) led him back to the cult but following the end of the relationship, he confronted his father about storing guns in what appeared to be preparations for civil war. Some time later Luke was admitted to hospital with a gun shot wound to his chest, inflicted by Ezra in self defence. Luke died and a majority of the cult killed themselves with poison in a suicide-pact as a result. Following this trauma, Ezra departed to stay with family outside Ferndale.

He returned later in the year to live with TK and immediately grew attracted to Rangimarie Rameka (Akinehi Munroe), deeply upsetting her mother Te Rongopai (Kim Garrett) when they started sleeping together. Ezra departed Ferndale to stay with family in mid 2019.

== Others ==
Date(s)	Character	Actor	Circumstances
2017 – 2018	Mindy Connelly	Catriona Toop	Mindy arrives and Frank recognises her. She reveals that she is still Frank's wife, exposing him as a bigamist. She insists on becoming a part of Frank's life again, continuing to drive a wedge between the rest of his family. Chris Warner (Michael Galvin) offers to pay Mindy to leave Frank alone and Ferndale for good and after bargaining with him, she settles on an amount. She soon returns in the new year to introduce Frank to his supposed son Zane (Liam Walker). In disbelief Frank orders a DNA test to ensure that it is his child and doing so also allows Mindy and Zane to stay at the Warner household. Zane wets the bed that night and when discovered in the morning Mindy starts to punish him. Frank steps in and becomes a step in parent until later in the day it is shown that Zane destroyed Kylie's laptop. Frank asks why he did it and Zane responds claiming that Kylie said she hated him and that he was pushed. While being supportive Frank also has his doubts, later it is revealed that Mindy is telling Zane to lie in order to get them back together which is what Zane and Mindy both want. However, when Zane was revealed not to be Frank's son, Mindy's emphysema returned, and proceeded to leave New Zealand with Zane again.
