= Sass Warner =

Sarah Warner
- Shortland Street character
- Portrayed by: Uncredited actor (1993); Lucy Lovegrove (2016–23)
- Duration: 1993, 2016–19, 2021, 2023
- First appearance: 11 October 1993
- Last appearance: 3 February 2023
- Introduced by: Brian Lenanne (1993); Maxine Fleming (2016); Oliver Driver (2023)
In-universe information
- Occupation: Executive Assistant
- Father: Chris Warner
- Mother: Carrie Burton
- Brothers: Frank Warner; Finn Warner
- Half-brothers: Phoenix Raynor; Harry Warner; James Warner
- Half-sisters: Trinity Kwan
- Husband: Mason Coutts (2017)
- Grandfathers: Sir Bruce Warner
- Grandmothers: Margot Warner
- Uncles: Guy Warner
- Aunts: Amanda Warner
- Nephews: Xun Warner
- Nieces: Amelie Warner
- First cousins: Tuesday Warner
- Other relatives: Isaac Worthington

Sarah "Sass" Warner (previously Burton, Connelly and Coutts) is a fictional character on the New Zealand soap opera Shortland Street. Born onscreen, Sass was originally played by an uncredited baby actor in 1993 before Lucy Lovegrove took over the role in 2016. Her early storylines focused on her casual relationship with Hawks Logan (Teone Kahu) and marrying Mason Coutts (Colin Moy) before the relationship turns disastrous and ultimately leading to his death. Sass proved popular amongst the viewers as a "beloved" character.

== Creation and casting ==
The character of Sass was introduced in 1993 during a plot in which "Robonurse" Carrie Burton (Lisa Crittenden) fell pregnant after receiving 3 different sperm donations from central characters. This was billed as a "whodunit" with nurse Steve Mills (Andrew Binns), Guy Warner (Craig Parker), Dr. Hone Ropata (Temuera Morrison) and Dr. Chris Warner (Michael Galvin) all potentially being the father. The character made her first appearance on 11 October 1993, when Carrie gave birth to her and her triplet siblings. The birth was used as a storyline to write off the character of Carrie, and she departed with her children on 11 November 1993. In 2015 producers decided to reintroduce the triplets 23 years after their disappearance. Finn (Lukas Whiting) was introduced in early 2016, with the decision to reintroduce the other two triplets throughout the remainder of the year. Lucy Lovegrove was working in a bookstore in Melbourne when she received the offer to play the role of Sass, an experience she referred to as, "literally one of those 'my life has changed over night' situations." Joining the soap was said to be, "very sudden ... I had six days to pack up my house, quit my job, say goodbye to my flatmates, fly to Canberra to say bye to my family and get to New Zealand. It was so rushed, I don’t think it really hit me until I arrived that I was going to be living in a new country." She believed she won the role due to the fact she "looks like Lukas" and that he "probably looks more like me than my actual brother." Lovegrove was mentored and eventually befriended by co-star Ngahuia Piripi (Esther Samuels). Lovegrove quit the role, with Sass departing in April 2018. Sass briefly returned to the show via a video call on the 2019 season finale.

== Development ==
=== Characterization ===
Sass has a Bachelor of Commerce and has worked a series of different jobs and now works as a personal assistant. Out of her 3 brothers, Sarah is described as the most dominant sibling out of her and her triplet brothers Finn and Frank. It is also said that she is closest to Finn rather than Frank and have a "close" but "competitive" relationship.

=== Warner family unit ===
The characters of Frank, Finn, and Sass were introduced in 1993 during a whodunit storyline, revolving around sperm donation to the head nurse, Carrie Burton. After departing later in the year, Chris Warner was revealed as the father. The triplets were individually reintroduced 23 years later and instantly bonded with their onscreen father, Michael Galvin. Patrick referred to working with Galvin as "pretty fun", and labelled him his "funny dad". He, Whiting, and Lovegrove referred to Galvin as "dad" onset and Patrick believed, "he's a top bloke and really acts like a father figure to us. He always helps us out and gives us guidance, but he can still be the biggest kid out of all us." The chemistry was so apparent between the cast that Whiting blamed Galvin for interrupting filming due to laughter between them. Patrick, Whiting, and Lovegrove were honoured to be a part of the triplet storyline and its history during the show's 25th anniversary, with Whiting believing, "it's a pretty special moment to be involved in, especially to be part of a storyline that's been 20 years in the making. And it's definitely cool for the long time fans who remember the triplets being born on the show and can now see that call come to fruition." Patrick and Whiting previously knew each other through acting school, and though Whiting and Lovegrove were of similar age living in Canberra, they were unaware of each other previously. After all three characters returned, there was an instant "family" connection between the actors with Patrick describing the family as, "nothing more than real really". The contrast was said to be immense between the often bickering triplets, and the "pizza catch ups" between the three actors. Lovegrove commented that the relationship between the three had become, "a real sibling relationship. We act like real-life triplets!"

=== Mason's revenge ===
Sass' ex-husband Mason Coutts (Colin Moy) "put into motion his revenge plot" on Sass and her family when a masked shooter gunned down her brother, Finn, and it later emerges that the shooter was ordered to do so by Mason. Although Mason is in jail he still has a holds a Chris as his "arch-enemy" and puts into action a revenge plot on the Warner family. Chris originally thought Masons plan was to kill him, but he then realises that Mason wants him to watch his family get punished, which to Chris is much worse. When the shooter puts the gun to Finn's head he says "Mason says Merry Christmas" shortly after the gunman is pushed out of a window to his death by Chris. Mason escapes prison and is on a boat with his son Jasper and Sass. Mason argues with Sass and he tells Jasper that she is "poison" and that "She'll get inside your heart and weaken it". Mason goes to throw Sass off the side of the boat but is interrupted when Jasper attacks him. Jasper gets injured and dies in Masons arms and Mason blames Sass for his death. Sass in a struggle with Mason manages to put a speargun through his throat. The pair struggle and Mason manages to pull Sass into the water where he reveals he has sent a gunman to kill her family. Mason drowns and the boat sails away, leaving Sass treading water in the ocean.

== Storylines ==
Desperate to have children but with no stable partner in her life, Shortland Street clinic's Head of nursing Carrie Burton (Lisa Crittenden) accepts sperm donations from nurse Steve Mills (Andrew Binns), Guy Warner (Craig Parker), Dr. Hone Ropata (Temuera Morrison) and Dr. Chris Warner (Michael Galvin); refusing to disclose whose sperm she used. She fell pregnant and married Steve's father Declan Kennedy (Kevin J. Wilson). Carrie gave birth to triplets during good friend Meredith Fleming's (Stephanie Wilkin) leaving party and named them, Frank, Finbar, and Sarah. Sarah was a surprise triplet, having been hidden behind her brothers in all of the previous scans. Sarah was the last to be born, but first to be named. The name came in tribute to Steve’s ex, and former Shortland Street nurse, Sarah Donnelly, who died at the end of 1992.

Declan proved to be a useless father and ended up fleeing the country to escape criminal associates he had, leaving Steve to be a surrogate parent. It turned out Sarah had a hole in her heart and came close to death during surgery. Carrie decided to flee Ferndale after receiving threats from Declan's criminal past, taking her triplets with her and leaving Steve (who had decided the children were likely his) heart broken. Several months later Steve was devastated to realise Chris had discovered he was the father and had been visiting Carrie and the triplets in Australia. This caused a rivalry between the two that ultimately led to Steve driving off the road and dying in an explosion. In November 1995 Chris visited Carrie and the triplets so that he could introduce his father Bruce (Ken Blackburn) to them before he succumbed to terminal cancer.

After having a one-night stand and not willing to pursue a relationship with a mysterious woman named "Sass", TK Samuels (Benjamin Mitchell) was shocked to realise she was Finn Connelly's (Lukas Whiting) triplet sister and long-lost daughter of Chris Warner. Sass quickly made an impression due to her direct and efficient manner, securing herself a position as Chris' executive assistant and making it clear she believed he had failed the triplets as a father. However the Warner family grew close, with Sass moving into the Warner household and getting to know half-brother Harry (Reid Walker). Sass began a casual relationship with Hawks but was devastated when he abandoned her to go to Fiji. Shortly after Sass fell in love with Mayor of Ferndale, Mason and the two wed in a hurried ceremony. Sass began to worry about Mason's manipulative and controlling manner, and was overjoyed when Hawks returned to Ferndale. Soon it became apparent that Mason ran a major criminal organisation and was poisoning Sass, leading her to return to Hawks after he saved her and Mason was arrested. Sass and Hawk's relationship was tested when he cheated on her, but the two found an intimate and forgiving nature between them. Sass struggled with Chris' diagnosis of Leukemia and ultimately changed her surname to Warner to celebrate him. Following Hawk's disclosure of the death of his son, he again abandoned Sass to serve in Syria, and several weeks later Sass received the news he had died in an explosion. Mason escaped from jail and kidnapped Sass and his son Jasper (Lachlan Forlong) on a boat, leading to Jasper dying from a head injury, and Sass murdering Mason with a harpoon gun. Sass escaped charges due to Mason's body deteriorating in the sea, leaving her a widow but away from his reign. She began to casually date Curtis Hannah (Jayden Daniels) but whilst preparing for Finn's wedding, received news that Hawks was in fact alive after months in hiding. She decided to leave Ferndale to care for Hawks in Turkey following the loss of his leg, and bid farewell to Chris and her family. In 2019, however, Hawks mentioned that their relationship is effectively over because his phantom pain was so bad, that it affected their relationship, and she had been in a relationship with a French man. On the 2019 cliffhanger, she appeared via Skype to reveal that she has travelled to Hollywood to see celebrities.

Sass made an appearance via video call after Chris was recovering from surgery in November 2021.

Sass would reappear in person in 2023, working with her father and Monique Strutter (Courtney Louise) on finances to reopen Shortland Street hospital after it burnt down in a fire at the end of 2022.

== Reception ==
The addition of Carrie's triplet storyline was praised for showing a "softer side" to the otherwise "stern matron". The return of Finn and his siblings was said to "delight" Shortland Street fans. Actor Michael Galvin (Dr. Chris Warner) named the triplet's returns in 2016 as his favourite storyline, noting the "fun" the co-stars have on set. He also aspired for the triplet's to remain on the show for a "long time to come". The chemistry between Galvin and the three triplet actors, was said to be very genuine and the triplets were so believable it appeared as though they were related in real life. Sass was said to be a "beloved" character. Following Lovegrove's departure, Galvin called for the actor's return calling the 3 triplet actors "fantastic" and how he "loved working with them."
