= Undercover (1991 film) =

- Directed by: Yvonne Mackay
- Written by: Arthur Baysting
- Produced by: Dave Gibson
- Starring: William Brandt; Jennifer Ludlam; Alistair Browning; James Heyward
- Cinematography: Wayne Vinten
- Edited by: Mike Bennett
- Music by: Sam Negri
- Release date: November 13, 1991
- Running time: 90 min
- Country: New Zealand
- Language: English

Undercover is a 1991 New Zealand television film. Inspired by the real story of undercover cop Wayne Haussman it was intended as a pilot for a series which was not developed.

== Synopsis ==
Young cop Tony goes undercover to find the Mr. Big of a heroin ring.

== Cast ==
- William Brandt as Tony
- Jennifer Ludlam as Sandy
- Alistair Browning as Eddie
- James Heyward as Robbo
- Sylvia Rands as Nancy
- Karen Holland as Treeza
- Richard Mills as Preston
- Cliff Curtis as Zip

== Reception ==
Helen Martin in New Zealand film, 1912-1996 says "Noir lighting, a handheld camera and a fluid shooting style create an atmosphere in keeping with the drug-trading genre and, unlike the unconvincing caricatures often appearing in this kind of television film, the characters are refreshingly ordinary and believable." OnFilm's Doug Coutts said "while Undercover had its fair share of flat spots in the script and acting departments, it also contained sufficient dolops of suspense and intrigue to keep some of us interested."

== Awards ==
New Zealand film and TV awards 1993

- Best Dramatic Performance (female) - Jennifer Ludlum - won
- Best Drama Programme - Undercover - won
- Best Dramatic Performance (male) - William Brandt - nominated
- Best Writer, Original Script - Arthur Baysting (Undercover) - nominated
