= Frank Warner (Shortland Street) =

- Shortland Street character
- Portrayed by: Uncredited actor (1993); Luke Patrick (2016–24)
- Duration: 1993, 2016–21, 2024
- First appearance: 11 October 1993
- Last appearance: 23 December 2024
- Introduced by: Brian Lenanne (1993); Maxine Fleming (2016, 2019); Oliver Driver (2020, 2024)
In-universe information
- Occupation: Hospital security guard Motorbike dealer Bartender at I.V. Bar
- Father: Chris Warner
- Mother: Carrie Connelly
- Brothers: Finn Warner
- Sisters: Sass Warner
- Half-brothers: Phoenix Warner; Harry Warner; James Warner
- Half-sisters: Trinity Kwan
- Wife: Mindy Connelly (2015–18); Kylie Brown (2017; void)
- Grandfathers: Sir Bruce Warner
- Grandmothers: Margot, Lady Warner
- Uncles: Guy Warner
- Aunts: Amanda Warner
- Nephews: Xin Warner
- Nieces: Amelie Warner
- First cousins: Tuesday Warner; Kelly Piper (possibly)
- Other relatives: Isaac Worthington; Joseph Worthington

Frank Warner (previously Burton and Connelly) is a fictional character on the New Zealand soap opera Shortland Street. Born on-screen, Frank was originally played by an uncredited baby actor in 1993 before Luke Patrick took over the role in 2016.

== Creation and casting ==
The character of Frank was introduced in 1993 during a plot in which "robo nurse" Carrie Burton (Lisa Crittenden) fell pregnant after receiving three different sperm donations from central characters. This was billed as a "whodunit" with nurse Steve Mills (Andrew Binns), Guy Warner (Craig Parker), Dr. Hone Ropata (Temuera Morrison) and Dr. Chris Warner (Michael Galvin) all potentially being the father. The character made his first appearance on 11 October 1993, when Carrie gave birth to him and his triplet siblings. The birth was used as a storyline to write off the character of Carrie, and she departed with her children on 11 November 1993.

In 2015 producers decided to reintroduce the triplets 23 years after their disappearance. The first two triplets, Finn (Lukas Whiting) and Sass (Lucy Lovegrove) were introduced throughout 2016. Whilst casting for the role of Frank, Whiting recommended acting school friend, Luke Patrick to play his triplet brother. The two had often been referred to as brother's during their acting training by other students. Patrick's agent called him to offer an audition, and having been raised in Australia he jokingly thought, "Does New Zealand really have its own TV shows?" Patrick was cast two weeks later, as Frank in what was his first television role. His casting was leaked to the media but due to the confidential nature of the characters introduction, the role was left ambiguous. Frank returned to Shortland Street during the show's 2016 Christmas cliffhanger.

In 2018 Patrick quit the role, with Frank making his final appearance on 3 September 2018. Due to the characters popularity and fan-demand, Patrick returned regularly in guest and recurring roles including for the end-of-season cliffhangers in 2019, 2020, and 2024.

== Development ==
=== The Warner family unit ===
The characters of Frank, Finn, and Sass were introduced in 1993 during a whodunit storyline, revolving around sperm donation to the head nurse, Carrie Burton. After departing later in the year, Chris Warner was revealed as the father. The triplets were individually reintroduced 23 years later and instantly bonded with their onscreen father, Michael Galvin. Patrick referred to working with Galvin as "pretty fun", and labelled him his "funny dad". He, Whiting, and Lovegrove referred to Galvin as "dad" onset and Patrick believed, "he's a top bloke and really acts like a father figure to us. He always helps us out and gives us guidance, but he can still be the biggest kid out of all us." The chemistry was so apparent between the cast that Whiting blamed Galvin for interrupting filming due to laughter between them. Patrick, Whiting, and Lovegrove were honoured to be a part of the triplet storyline and its history during the show's 25th anniversary, with Whiting believing, "it's a pretty special moment to be involved in, especially to be part of a storyline that's been 20 years in the making. And it's definitely cool for the long time fans who remember the triplets being born on the show and can now see that call come to fruition." Patrick and Whiting previously knew each other through acting school, and though Whiting and Lovegrove were of similar age living in Canberra, they were unaware of each other previously. After all three characters returned, there was an instant "family" connection between the actors with Patrick describing the family as, "nothing more than real really". The contrast was said to be immense between the often bickering triplets, and the "pizza catch ups" between the three actors. Lovegrove commented that the relationship between the three had become "a real sibling relationship. We act like real-life triplets!" Following Frank's return in 2019, he shared scenes for the first time with half-brother Phoenix Warner (Geordie Holibar) and the relationship was said to be one of "sharing wisdom".

=== Relationship with Kylie Brown ===
Upon introduction, Frank was paired with established character Kylie Brown (Kerry-Lee Dewing), a fan favourite character who had been involved in a long running romance storyline with TK Samuels (Benjamin Mitchell). Patrick was uncertain on the audience reaction to the coupling, "I'm definitely prepared for fans to be stunned, especially with Frank being a new character coming into Shorty and Kylie's the it-girl of Shortland Street". Despite this hesitation, Patrick was ensured by the show's producer that the relationship would be legitimate and long-running. The pair meet at 'The I.V.' bar, and the resulting relationship was said to be "passionate", "saucy" and saw an early skinny dip scene between the two. The skinny dip scene was Patrick's first day filming and despite recalling it as "embarrassing", he believed it was an easy way to break barriers between himself and Dewing. Despite only dating for several weeks, the character's returned from a short hiatus with the news that they were married. Dewing also questioned fan reaction due to the short length of time following Kylie's relationship breakdown with TK, "I think a lot of people will question (the relationship's) longevity at this point. However, it's almost so unrealistic, that it's kind of believable that someone so different would come along and sweep her in a totally different direction and that she would just fall for it 100 per cent." Patrick believed the relationship worked because, "Frank has a big heart. He's just been really conflicted most of his life and he's never felt like he belonged anywhere" but "that's partly what draws Kylie to Frank. She's had all these troublesome relationships and even though there's doubt within himself about whether he's good enough, he knows that he's the right guy for her."

Frank departed the show in 2018 leaving Kylie behind with serial killer Dylan Reinhart (Ryan O'Kane). Upon his return in 2019, Kylie had reconciled with ex-partner TK Samuels. Patrick believed that Frank would "be happy because she's happy and that's all he's ever wanted, whether that's with him or without him." However Patrick acknowledged that Frank "wants to reconcile with Kylie, and maybe sit down and have a chat with her about why he left and how he's grown".

== Storylines ==
Desperate to have children but with no stable partner in her life, Shortland Street clinic's head of nursing Carrie Burton (Lisa Crittenden) accepted sperm donations from nurse Steve Mills (Andrew Binns), Guy Warner (Craig Parker), Dr. Hone Ropata (Temuera Morrison) and Dr. Chris Warner (Michael Galvin), refusing to disclose whose sperm she used. She fell pregnant and married Steve's father Declan Kennedy (Kevin J. Wilson). Carrie gave birth to triplets during good friend Meredith Fleming's (Stephanie Wilkin) leaving party and named them Frank, Finbar, and Sarah. Frank was named after Carrie’s mother Francis. Declan proved to be a useless father and ended up fleeing the country to escape criminal associates, leaving Steve to be a surrogate parent. It turned out Sarah had a hole in her heart and came close to death during surgery. Carrie decided to flee Ferndale after receiving threats from Declan's criminal past, taking her triplets with her and leaving Steve (who had decided the children were likely his) heart broken. Several months later Steve was devastated to realise Chris had discovered he was the father and had been visiting Carrie and the triplets in Australia (Adelaide to be precise). This caused a rivalry between the two that ultimately led to Steve driving off the road and dying in an explosion. In November 1995 Chris visited Carrie and the triplets so that he could introduce his father Bruce (Ken Blackburn) to them before he succumbed to terminal cancer.

Upon Finn's return to Shortland Street in 2016, he noted to Chris that Frank had struggled with Carrie succumbing to cancer, had pursued a life of crime, and was serving time in prison for armed robbery. Breaking into Chris' house during Christmas 2016, Frank quickly made his mark in Ferndale, purposefully sabotaging local bar 'The I.V.' in an attempt to secure a job there. Having successfully manipulated his way into a barman role, Frank met and fell in love with nurse Kylie Brown (Kerry-Lee Dewing) and whilst away on a long weekend together, the two married. Desperate to reform from criminality, Frank started a motorbike repair business but fell into bad terms with a local motorbike gang and lost the business whilst uninsured in a volcanic eruption. Assaulting a security man, Frank stole $20,000 that resulted in 'The I.V.' spiralling into financial debt and owner Vinnie Kruse (Pua Magasiva) having to sell out. Frank struggled with Chris' diagnosis of leukaemia and ended up donating bone marrow that saw Chris overcome his cancer. Frank emotionally revealed to his siblings that his stepfather had abused him as a child and as a result, the triplets adorned the surname of Warner. Frank was shocked with the return of his manipulative wife Mindy (Catriona Toop) who he believed was dead, making his marriage to Kylie void.

Chris managed to pay Mindy off to divorce Frank but the damage was too severe for Kylie, who left Frank. However following Frank taking a bullet from an attempted shooting of Finn, the couple reunited and decided to have children. Chris helped Frank get hired as a security guard at the hospital but following Kylie suffering a miscarriage, Frank began to feel uncomfortable with Kylie's brother-in-law Dylan Reinhart (Ryan O'Kane) and lost his job following staff-protest to Chris' nepotism. Getting involved in a drug smuggling business, Frank eventually returned to the hospital but in his guilt, hired the security guard he had previously assaulted who was inept at the job due to the resulting brain injury. Sensing Frank's guilt and realising the crime, Dylan blackmailed him and convinced him to flee town to escape his demons. Breaking up with Kylie, Frank fled Ferndale on a motorbike. Frank unexpectedly returned in the final minutes of 2019 season much to the shock of ex-wife Kylie Brown and TK Samuels.

Frank shocked all when he unexpectedly returned at Christmas 2019. Hoping to win back Kylie, he was saddened to learn she had reconciled with TK Samuels. Reunited with his younger brother Phoenix (Geordie Holibar), Frank helped him care for newborn daughter Amelie but was shocked to discover he was embezzling significant amounts from their father. Giving his blessing to Kylie's wedding to TK, he was shocked when she confessed the murder of Dylan to him alongside another murder and asked to reunite and flee Ferndale. Frank helped her confess to police and saw her departure. Working at the bar, he tried to overcome his sadness with a brief fling with Shereez Baker (Timmie Cameron) but found solace in helping a young man who stole his motorbike. Deciding to pursue a career of prisoner-rehabilitation, Frank departed for Wellington.

Frank returned following Phoenix's untimely death and supported Chris through his depressive episode. Undergoing a feud with a corrupt policeman, Frank rescued Chris from his attempted suicide and nursed him following a shooting from the cop. Shortly after, he was offered his dream role as a Social Worker in Kaitaia and opted to leave Ferndale. Throughout 2024 Frank communicated with Chris as he followed leads to find brother Harry (Xander Manktelow) in Asia following revelations he had murdered two people. Frank ultimately returned at Christmas alongside Finn and uncle Guy (Craig Parker) having located Harry and brought him home.

== Reception ==
The addition of Carrie's triplet storyline was praised for showing a "softer side" to the otherwise "stern matron". The return of Finn and his siblings was said to "delight" Shortland Street fans. Actor Michael Galvin (Dr. Chris Warner) named the triplet's returns in 2016 as his favourite storyline, noting the "fun" the co-stars have on set. He also aspired for the triplet's to remain on the show for a "long time to come". The chemistry between Galvin and the three triplet actors, was said to be very genuine and the triplets were so believable it appeared as though they were related in real life. Frank's line: "Tell me where my sister is or I’ll rip ya head off and spit down ya neck" was nominated by The Spinoff columnists as one of the 25th anniversary episode's best quotes. Following Patrick's departure, Galvin called for the actor's return calling the triplet actors "fantastic" and how he "loved working with them." The character of Frank was reportedly very popular with fans following his 2016 return and this was said to increase once Patrick departed the soap. This led to the character being reintroduced in 2019.

Frank's return during the 2019 season finale was described as "huge" by television columnist Kate Robertson, and was said to be "just what ... fans have been demanding."
