= Esther Samuels =

- Shortland Street character
- Portrayed by: Ngahuia Piripi
- Duration: 2015–
- First appearance: 14 October 2015
- Introduced by: Simon Bennett
- Spin-off appearances: Shortland Street: Retribution (2021)
In-universe information
- Occupation: House Officer; Doctor/Surgeon; Head of Department - Surgical (2021); CEO Shortland Street Hospital (2023—)
- Father: Paora Samuels
- Mother: Kahu Samuels
- Sisters: Anahera Samuels
- Husband: Finn Warner (2018–2019); Marty Walker (2023–)
- Sons: Kiwa Adams-Samuels; Potiki Walker
- Daughters: Pikitia Hannah
- Grandmothers: Māreikura Samuels
- Uncles: Wiremu Samuels; Mitch Samuels
- Aunts: Kuini Samuels; Dottie Samuels; Miri Samuels; Liz Arthur
- First cousins: Huia Samuels; Tane Samuels; Rua Potae; Amos Samuels
- Other relatives: Wiremu Potae; TK Samuels; Gia Te Atakura; Tillie Samuels

Esther Māreikura Samuels is a fictional character on New Zealand's longest-running soap opera Shortland Street, played by actress Ngahuia Piripi since 2015.

== Creation and casting ==
At 25, Ngahuia Piripi was cast as Esther Samuels, a "a young doctor with a forthright attitude"; making her debut on 14 October 2015. The character was written as the daughter of established character TK Samuels' (Benjamin Mitchell) cousin, being so personally close they had an "uncle-niece" relationship. Piripi took inspiration from her stepmother for the role as she was, "an awesome, beautiful, very strong Māori lady ... She’s quite similar to what I imagined Esther being like, a real-life example for me." Piripi sought to portray Esther for the long-term, passing her 10 year anniversary on the soap, "I want to be on the show long enough for Esther to become prime minister ... I never really had that dream [of pursuing Hollywood acting] and I discovered that early in my years at Shortland Street." Piripi's real-life pregnancy was incorporated into storylines, with Esther falling pregnant on-screen.

== Storylines ==
Winning a job at Shortland Street hospital in October 2015, Esther surprised her family member TK Samuels (Benjamin Mitchell) upon arriving in Ferndale having recently graduated Medical school. Quickly overcoming her fear of needles, Esther succeeded in her medical rotation in the Emergency Department. She quickly fell for criminal turned barman Curtis Hannah (Jayden Daniels) but was devastated when she learned it was an affair as he was dating Lucy Rickman (Grace Palmer). Eventually reconciling once Curtis' relationship with Lucy ended, the romance was short-lived due to his badboy nature and Esther fell for Chris Warner's (Michael Galvin) son Finn (Lukas Whiting). However Esther once again returned to Curtis, only for him to be sent to prison and break up with her.

After collapsing whilst performing CPR on a patient, Esther was diagnosed with hypertrophic cardiomyopathy, a terminal heart condition. Struggling with the diagnosis, reduced work duties, and the torment of Finn's stalker Jason Kirkpatrick (Thomas Sainsbury), Esther and Finn reconciled and got engaged. Despite Curtis' confession of love, Esther married Finn. The marriage soon faced trouble when an increasingly irate Finn was suspended from work and physically assaulted Esther twice, to the point of broken ribs. The marriage collapsed and Esther moved into the surgical department. Smitten by the return of her childhood love Kawe Osbourne (James Rolleston), the two reconciled their love despite Kawe's drug dealing troubles. Ambushed by some rival dealers, Kawe was murdered and Esther went into cardiac arrest, only surviving by receiving a heart transplant from Kawe's body through an illegal surgery performed by TK's partner Te Rongopai Rameka (Kim Garrett).

Returning full-time to work duties following a successful transplant, Esther had a brief flirtation with Hawks Logan (Teone Kahu) before having non-consentual sex with colleague Ben King (Jamie Irvine). Esther soon realised she had been raped but declined to press charges, opting to educate Ben on consent and the harm he had caused. She started a casual relationship with Leanne's (Jennifer Ludlam) son Eddie (Rawiri Jobe) but was shocked when she fell pregnant; giving birth to their son Kiwa. However the return of Curtis proved too much for her and Eddie, and they broke up. Reconciling with Curtis, Esther was promoted to the Head of Surgery role at the hospital. She soon fell pregnant to Curtis, but whilst visiting him whilst he was serving as an undercover policeman in Christchurch, she devastatingly found his body having been murdered shortly after she had given birth to their daughter, Pikitea.

Being supported through the tragedy by her flatmate Marty Walker (Scott Smart), she soon discovered they had developed mutual feelings. Eventually beginning to date, the arrival of Rahu Parata (Zak Martin) made her question her cultural compatibility with Marty and they broke up over Matariki as a result. However a drunken one-night-stand between the two led to a pregnancy, and they reconciled and married to support their future child. However, after going into cardiac arrest, Marty made the decision to terminate their child to save Esther - leading to a separation. Upon returning to Ferndale some time later, Esther forgave Marty and they grieved for their unborn son Potiki Walker. Esther soon found herself approached for the role of CEO of the hospital, to which she eventually accepted with TK's blessing. Her and Marty's relationship was again tested when she discovered his addiction to anxiety medication “Zeclastion”, but she supported him through his recovery.

== Development ==
Esther was written as fluent in Te Reo Maori, with early scenes demonstrating this. She was involved in several high-profile "issue-based" storylines that included: being domestically abused by husband Finn Warner (Lukas Whiting), being attacked by drug dealers, and being forced to have sex with colleague Ben King (Jamie Irvine). This has resulted to frequent emotional scenes, with Piripi reflecting, "She's called sooky eyes now because she's been such a victim for so long". Piripi believed Esther's pregnancy with boyfriend Eddie (Rawiri Jobe) allowed for a modern depiction of a family unit, "We are trying to show family dynamics; that it's not your perfect everyday-looking gamily with a mum and a dad that are happily married ... I like it that the situation is very different and that's very real for a lot of people in New Zealand". A 2021 storyline saw Esther protest at the gender-pay gap in New Zealand, with Piripi pleased at the character development; she commented, "It’s nice to have something career focused for a change, rather than it being about the love triangle or family problems, you know, all the dramatic stuff ... what I wanted to do was just tell it as Esther’s story and Esther’s story only but, hopefully, in a way that it may inspire others to back themselves in the same way that Esther did." By 2024, Piripi noted that Esther had become "a female version" of TK Samuels (Benjamin Mitchell).

=== Relationship with Curtis Hannah ===
In 2015, Esther embarks on a relationship with criminal Curtis Hannah (Jayden Daniels). Daniels had a strong relationship with Piripi and he believed that this helped the onscreen relationship, commenting, "If we couldn't get on off-screen, I think it would be hard to find that chemistry on screen." Throughout 2016, Curtis actively tried to steal Esther from her boyfriend Finn (Lukas Whiting), eventually succeeding. Daniels thought Curtis and Finn's rivalry played out well, "Because we're such good friends, we can push each other further safely on screen". Despite the on-off nature of Curtis and Esther, Daniels believed, "they'll definitely end up together. They're each other's soul mate." However Curtis' arrest saw the couple separated which "saddened" Daniels as well as Curtis, "It breaks his heart as well because I think she's his soulmate. He's really in love with her and they've just got together and then this happens and it's quite devastating." Whilst Curtis spent time in jail, Esther reunited with Finn with Piripi stating she did, "genuinely believe that Esther loves both Curtis and Finn but, with Curtis, she just loved him more. I feel like with Esther and Finn, I think she's fighting feelings she's had there because she knows her feelings for Curtis are stronger." As Finn and Esther planned to marry in March 2018, Curtis still believed "that he is the better man for her." Piripi believed that Finn was the right choice for Esther, "There's always going to be that love that Curtis and Esther have ... It is that first love. It's that one that stole your heart. You realise as you drift apart, grow apart, you become different people but it's shared experiences, and shared history that really ties those people. I think Finn is something new and Esther sees a future in that rather than holding onto the nostalgia that is Curtis." Esther's later relationship with Eddie Adams was challenged when he discovered she was still contacting Curtis, with Piripi explaining: "Everyone has that one what-if guy or girl and I think Curtis is definitely that for Esther ... She just can't seem to let him go whether he's there or not. She just can't move on. Curtis and Esther eventually reconciled and had a daughter, Pikitea. However Curtis was killed off in the online spinoff Shortland Street: Retribution, with Daniels acknowledging fan's disappointment, "I think people will be sad but nothing can last forever so I do hope that in the end that they will be satisfied with how everything wraps up." Curtis' death continued featuring in storylines on-screen with Esther struggling with the grief.

== Reception ==
The character of Esther was popular, leading to Piripi to become "well-known" to New Zealand audiences. However her first appearances proved more polarising with social media showcasing high levels of abuse toward the character and actress.
