= Leanne Black =

Fictional character from Shortland Street

- Shortland Street character
- Portrayed by: Jennifer Ludlam
- Duration: 2010–2011, 2014–2024
- First appearance: 27 April 2010
- Last appearance: 14 July 2024
- Introduced by: Steven Zanoski (2010, 2011); Simon Bennett (2014); Oliver Driver (2024)
In-universe information
- Husband: William Miller (until 2008); Howard Black (2016)
- Sons: Eddie Adams; Eric Miller
- Daughters: Nicole Miller
- Stepdaughters: Morgan Braithwaite
- Grandsons: Pele Kruse-Miller; Kiwa Adams-Samuels
- Granddaughters: Kiri Miller

Leanne Black (previously Miller) is a fictional character on the New Zealand soap opera Shortland Street who was portrayed by Jennifer Ludlam. Leanne debuted as the mother of established character Nicole Miller (Sally Martin) in a guest role in 2010, before reprising the role in more central positions in both 2011 and 2014. Leanne would leave to travel the world in 2023 before returning in another guest role to kill the character off in 2024.

== Creation and casting ==
The character of Leanne was created as the mother of established character Nicole Miller (Sally Martin) in a storyline that saw her come out as bisexual to her family and reveal her relationship with Maia Jeffries (Anna Jullienne). Jennifer Ludlam was offered the role due to what she believed as, "being a certain age, and looking like I could pass for Nicole's mother." Ludlam had previously appeared on the soap in 1992 playing the role of Miles Lucas' mother Beverly Lucas. Leanne debuted onscreen in April 2010 and Ludlam enjoyed shooting the show due to the outspoken nature of her character. Ludlam was offered a reprisal of the role the following year and she appeared for 5 weeks in recurring role. She made her last appearance on 25 February 2011.

Ludlam was offered to reprise the role 3 years later and agreed upon learning she was going to have, "my own arc and be a person." Leanne returned in March 2014, in a more central role that saw her become the receptionist at the hospital. Ludlam found it daunting filming at the reception desk due to its "iconic" nature and having worked with several former actors who played the receptionist role such as Elizabeth McRae (Marj Brasch), Geraldine Brophy (Moira Crombie) and Alison Quigan (Yvonne Jeffries). Ludlam was pleased how the character had developed following her 2014 return, "I feel very lucky. I came in for 6 months because I looked like I could play Sally Martin's mother and then years later I am still here and the writers have - and this is fantastic - have really started writing for me.". Ludlam played the role on both a regular and recurring basis, often departing for months-long stints for theatre shows; leaving the core cast in 2021. Ludlam ultimately quit the show in 2023 to return to theatre work, making her final appearance on 12 May.

Ludlam intended this to be Leanne's final time on the show until she was contacted the following year with a pitch to kill off the character, and explore a cancer story alongside the complexities of recently introduced assisted dying legislation. She thought being able to return for Leanne's death was a, "gift, in a way" and the cancer storyline was, "quite important to get it right − and really trust my feelings and trust the writers" and "a privilege to farewell Leanne properly." Ludlam signed a 8-week contract that would cover her return and on-screen death. Noting Leanne's spirituality, she didn't rule out a return after death: "she'll probably pop-up ... anything's possible on Shortland Street." The character died on-screen on 9 July 2024.

== Storylines ==
In late 2009 Nicole Miller (Sally Martin) informed recently discovered half-sister Morgan Braithwaite (Bonnie Soper) that her family were eager to meet her, primarily her mother Leanne. Several months after Morgan's untimely death, Nicole's ex-girlfriend Maia Jeffries (Anna Jullienne) and Gerald Tippett (Harry McNaughton) visited Tauranga to find a recently runaway Nicole and ended up staying at Leanne's house. Nicole and Maia were forced to keep their relationship private due to Leanne's conservative nature but when Nicole eventually came out, Leanne disowned her unless she dumped Maia permanently. Nicole at first accepted but later fled Tauranga and reunited with Maia in Ferndale. The following year Leanne arrived in Ferndale and pronounced her new pro-gay attitude, being openly-approving of Nicole and Maia's relationship. However, after discovering Maia had cheated on Nicole, Leanne set about sabotaging the two and tried to set Nicole up with both Hunter McKay (Lee Donoghue) and Maxwell Avia (Robbie Magasiva). Whilst out for a walk, Leanne was mugged and injured, extending her stay in Ferndale that eventually saw her receive a job as the hospital receptionist. However Leanne soon realised she was holding Nicole back from a relationship and returned to Tauranga.

In 2012 Nicole visited Leanne after her brother Eric (Mick Andrews) had a severe schizophrenic episode. In 2014 Nicole and Vinnie Kruse (Pua Magasiva) returned to Tauranga after Leanne requested help with Eric once again. However, when Nicole suggested Leanne was the issue, she kicked her out only to show up in Ferndale with Eric. Following Eric being sent into care, Leanne made it clear that she thought Nicole should date Vinnie over girlfriend Harper Whitley (Ria Vandervis). She returned to her role as receptionist at the hospital having sold her house in Tauranga. Leanne had a brief flirtation with Murray Cooper (Matthew Chamberlain) after mistakenly believing he and his wife Wendy (Jacqueline Nairn) were swingers. She began to date Nev Carlson (Stuart Devenie) much to the angst of Nicole, but he left her for one of his five ex-wives. Leanne soon found herself becoming a burden to her family but this changed when she started to date Howard Black (Michael Saccente) who lavished her in expensive gifts. Though it soon turned out he had a potentially terminal illness and he returned to America, with Leanne nearly leaving New Zealand to join him on the day of Nicole's wedding.

In 2016 Leanne began to feel elderly and underwent plastic surgery only for the anaesthetic not to work, leading to her being awake but paralysed during the botched procedure. Feeling increasingly unwanted at work, Leanne was overjoyed when Howard returned to Ferndale. The two decided to marry and after realising how much she needed to move on, she left Ferndale. Three months later, Leanne returned to Ferndale as a joyous newlywed but it soon turned out Howard had fallen overboard of the cruise ship and had drowned.

Returning to the reception desk, Leanne realised she had grown smitten to much younger man, IT worker Damo (Grant Lobban). Hesitant to act on their feelings due to the age-gap, Leanne focused on her career and worked her way to Personal Assistant to the CEO. Her and Damo eventually decided to pursue their relationship, which was briefly tested when Damo saved himself over-her during an earthquake. The couple purchased 'The I.V.' Bar and lived upstairs. They later unofficially married in a cosplay ceremony in the bar courtyard. The revelation that Leanne had a long-lost son Eddie (Rawiri Jobe) shocked Ferndale but he was welcomed into the Miller family with Leanne eventually becoming a maternal figure to him. The return of Eddie's rockstar father Willy Marsh (Jim Moriarty) proved too much to a jealous Damo, and Leanne decided to flee Ferndale to reunite with Willy and go on one of his tours.

Leanne returned 6 months later, having ended her relationship with Willy and disproving of Damo's new flirtation with Desi (Kura Forrester). She began to date Marty's (Scott Smart) father Graham (Nigel Godfrey) and lost all her money in a poor investment into son Eddie's music festival. This looked to be reversed when she won millions of dollars in a lottery ticket win, only to lose the ticket. Leanne retired from the front-desk and began working at the flower stall only to secretly fall in love with Nicole's wife Maeve's (Jess Sayer) mother Rosalyn (Theresa Healey). When her boyfriend Graham walked in on Leanne and Rosalyn kissing, he suffered a heart attack and died. Leanne and Rosalyn soon made their love known and later left Ferndale together.

Leanne returned some months later with Rosalyn having left her for a man. During a drunken night, she had a one-night-stand with Damo, and later supported him when he was hit by a bus, acknowledging the love they once had. Volunteering at the hospital, Leanne eventually reconciled with Rosalyn and suffering financial hardship, couldn't believe when she won millions in the lottery for a second time. Leaving Ferndale for good, a "Leanne Black" bench was placed in the hospital hallway in her honour. Leanne made an unexpected return the following year, upsetting Maeve when it was revealed she had left Rosalyn abruptly. Returning to the hospital desk, it soon became apparent Leanne was unwell when she started seeing visions of Nicole's stillborn daughter Kiri Miller. The family were devastated when Leanne was diagnosed with terminal bowel cancer that had spread to her brain. Initially opting for surgery due to Nicole's pressure, Leanne chose to see out her illness farewelling her friends and former lovers, with a "living funeral" organised by her daughter. Letting Ros know the truth that she had left her due to fear of death and allowing her to move on, Leanne chose to apply for assisted dying, but fell into a coma before this could come to fruition. After having goodbyes from her family and spending her days with Nicole, Leanne died with Chris Warner passing on his condolences by her side. She was later cremated after her organs were donated. However: Her ashes was mixed up with a pet cat of Thaddeus' friend, Fleur.

She left video messages to her friends and family, but she only left a valuable vase as Nicole's fortunes. However: Nicole's spiralling emotional state drove her to smash the vase.

== Reception ==
Ludlam highly enjoyed portraying Leanne throughout her first stint as she liked the extremities of Leanne's homophobia and believed it provided an interesting character to play. However upon her second stint that saw Leanne accepting towards Nicole and Maia's relationship, Ludlam believed that the character had been toned down and found portraying the character to be "a lot less fun". Leanne's mispronunciation of Ula Levi's (Frankie Adams) name as "Ew-la" became a running joke throughout the cast and crew, with a 2015 scene showing Ula correcting her after many months, receiving much praise by the audience. Actress Karima Madut praised the relationship between Leanne and her character fellow receptionist Clementine Dean, "They are a great team, I guess Leanne is more the older, wiser woman and they develop a great relationship. My character looks up to her and she learns to not become more subdued, but she starts to become more thoughtful."

The character proved hugely controversial upon her debut April 2010 after several homophobic comments she made were perceived to be insulting the city of Tauranga in suggesting it was not gay friendly. The controversy surrounded Leanne telling Gerald Tippett (Harry McNaughton) that his shirt was "too gay" for Tauranga. The episode also featured Nicole referring to the city as not being as gay friendly as Auckland. Bay of Plenty Tourism general manager, Tim Burgess believed the show was establishing a "negative stereotype," and that the, "only positive thing I can say is they were pronouncing Tauranga and Mauao correctly." In response to the episode he referred to the writing team as "disappointing and lazy." Burgess also requested an apology. Matthew Denton of the University of Auckland student magazine, Craccum, named Leanne as the shows 5th most annoying character. He attributed this to her blatant homophobia and the irony of this due to her disregard for relationships after attempting to seduce married man Murray Cooper (Matthew Chamberlain). Leanne's homophobia again drew controversy in 2017, with a stuff.co.nz columnist believing it was sending the wrong message to young watchers. Tara Strong of The Spinoff website praised Leanne and Howard's romance and compared them to Prince Charles and Camilla, Duchess of Cornwall. She believed their wedding episode was a "perfect" exit for the character.

The death of Leanne in July 2024 saw an outpouring of grief online, for the "popular character". An official Shortland Street social media post reportedly caused confusion to some members of the public, mistakenly believing Ludlam had died rather than the role she played.
