= List of Shortland Street characters introduced in 2021 =

The following is a list of characters that first appeared in the New Zealand soap opera Shortland Street in 2021, by order of first appearance.

== Samira Moradi ==
Samira Moradi
- Shortland Street character
- Portrayed by: Roxie Mohebbi
- Duration: 2021–2022
- First appearance: 21 May 2021
- Last appearance: 22 March 2022
- Introduced by: Oliver Driver
In-universe information
- Occupation: Doctor

Samira Moradi (Roxie Mohebbi) appeared as a regular character on Shortland Street from 2021 to 2022, with storylines primarily focusing on her medical ambition and complex romantic relationships. She was introduced as a hotel cleaner who caught the eye of happily engaged Prince Kimiora, with whom she eventually began an affair despite his engagement to Dawn. Samira joined the hospital staff and the betrayal was publicly exposed when a confrontation between Dawn and Samira was accidentally live-streamed, causing widespread gossip at Ferndale Hospital and prompting Samira to temporarily depart Ferndale.

Upon returning, Samira built bridges with Dawn and pursued training as a junior surgeon and sought mentorship from the new Head of Department, Dr. Francesca Telford. Their professional relationship evolved into a secret romance, which created significant workplace tension due to concerns over ethics and career advancement. The relationship dissolved following a misunderstanding involving a falsified diary entry, leading to Francesca's exit from the hospital. Samira subsequently had a brief relationship with flatmate Marty Walker before accepting a surgical placement in Australia, ending her time on the show as she moved overseas to advance her career.

== Madonna Diaz ==
Madonna Diaz
- Shortland Street character
- Portrayed by: Marianne Infante
- Duration: 2021—2025
- First appearance: 23 July 2021
- Last appearance: 22 April 2025
- Introduced by: Oliver Driver
In-universe information
- Occupation: Nurse
- Mother: Carmelita Diaz
- Husband: Samson (until 2022); Viliami To'a (2023—2024)
- Daughters: Joy Diaz

Madonna Diaz first appeared as part of the cast in mid-2021. Infante was the first Filipino actor to play a core-cast member on Shortland Street.

== Viliami To'a ==
Viliami To'a
- Shortland Street character
- Portrayed by: Theo David
- Duration: 2021—
- First appearance: 6 August 2021
- Introduced by: Oliver Driver
In-universe information
- Occupation: Nurse; Paramedic; Professional Rugby League player
- Mother: Hanalei To'a
- Sisters: Selina To'a
- Wife: Madonna Diaz (2023—25)
- Nephews: Junior To'a

== Joy Diaz ==
Joy Diaz
- Shortland Street character
- Portrayed by: Saya Kraetzer (2021); Athena Matthews (2022–2023)
- Duration: 2021–2023
- First appearance: 31 August 2021
- Last appearance: 20 December 2023
- Introduced by: Oliver Driver
In-universe information
- Father: Samson
- Mother: Madonna Diaz
- Grandmothers: Carmelita Diaz

== Francesca Telford ==
Francesca Telford
- Shortland Street character
- Portrayed by: Sara Wiseman
- Duration: 2021–2022
- First appearance: 2 November 2021
- Last appearance: 10 February 2022
- Introduced by: Oliver Driver
In-universe information
- Occupation: Head of Surgery (2021–22)

Francesca Telford appeared for 5 months from November 2021. Wiseman's casting was announced alongside Ava Diakhaby, and was said to be one of New Zealand's "most successful actresses" returning to the show. Francesca was the third role Wiseman had played in the soap, having previously appeared in the nineties and as Jennifer Mason in 2010.

Francesca arrived to Ferndale as the new Head of Surgery at Shortland Street Hospital. Francesca was a long-time friend of Chris Warner's (Michael Galvin) partner Viv (Katherine Kennard), and found herself supporting Viv through a violent ordeal with an ex-partner. Facing misogyny from fellow surgeon Drew McCaskill (Ben Barrington), Francesca found herself promoting younger colleague Samira Moradi (Roxie Mohebbi). Whilst on a 'Women in Medicine' conference, the two began an affair and struggled with the dynamic upon returning to work. Ultimately Samira broke off the relationship and Francesca opted to leave Ferndale.

== Jojo Starkey ==
Jojo Starkey
- Shortland Street character
- Portrayed by: Ava Diakhaby
- Duration: 2021–2022
- First appearance: 19 October 2021
- Last appearance: 10 November 2022
- Introduced by: Oliver Driver
In-universe information
- Occupation: Nurse; Bartender
- Grandfathers: Robert Starkey

Jojo Starkey initially appeared for a 3 month stint in October 2021, before returning for another stint the following year. Diakhaby's casting was announced alongside Sara Wiseman, and was said to be one of New Zealand's "biggest up-and-comers ... joining the ranks."

Jojo arrived to Ferndale and quickly demonstrated her party-girl ways, falling into a casual relationship with Louis King (Henry Rolleston) and frustrating flatmate Dawn (Rebekah Randell) when she began to over-step her mark; including adopting a dog and naming her after Dawn's dog. Jojo worked in the hospital as a nurse but sick of the shifts, left to work at 'The I.V. Bar'. Catching the eye of Vili (Joshua David), the two began to sleep together much to the annoyance of his ex-girlfriend Madonna (Marianne Infante). When Jojo realised Vili still loved Madonna, she made efforts to undermine her before opting to leave Ferndale to become a Nanny in Spain.

Some months later Jojo was admitted to hospital after the car she was driving crashed and seriously injured her grandfather Robert (Chris Vidal). Robert did not survive and a devastated Jojo was supported by Vili and Madonna, returning to work at the hospital. Despite a growing attraction from Vili, Jojo tried to keep a distance before eventually reconciling. Vili began to develop a drug habit and whilst out supporting him on a paramedic shift, the two drove off a cliff and were trapped in the overturned vehicle. Surviving for over 24 hours suspended in tree branches, Vili was shocked to discover Jojo had succumbed to internal injuries.

The character's first stint received backlash from fans, leading to a more "empathetic" effort being made for her upon return. Fans were said to be "won-over" by the change in characterisation.
