= List of Shortland Street characters introduced in 2020 =

The following is a list of characters that first appeared in the New Zealand soap opera Shortland Street in 2020, by order of first appearance. All characters are introduced by the shows executive producer Oliver Driver. The 28th season of 'Shortland Street began airing on 13 January 2020.

== Michelle Beaufort ==
Michelle Beaufort
- Shortland Street character
- Portrayed by: Lisa Chappell
- Duration: 2020–2022
- First appearance: 17 February 2020
- Last appearance: 6 June 2022
- Introduced by: Oliver Driver
In-universe information
- Daughters: Petra Beaufort

Michelle Beaufort, played by Lisa Chappell made her first appearance on 17 February 2020. Michelle is described as a conservative politician.

Michelle first appears in The I.V. while Chris, Phoenix and Tess with their baby daughter Amelie are having dinner, they invite Michelle to sit with them and have dinner but she declines and leaves. Chris and Michelle eventually start a relationship and Michelle eventually moves in with him. Michelle is later shocked when her daughter Petra ends up at Shortland Street hospital after her breast surgery goes wrong. Michelle later supports Chris after Phoenix dies from a drug overdose in October. In early 2021 Michelle starts receiving threatening messages from an interview she posted and is nearly killed at a protest rally, Michelle later blames herself when someone breaks into her apartment and attempts to kidnap Tess Hutchinson's (Becky McEwan) baby daughter Amelie. In September 2021, Chris and Michelle go away for a few weeks, when Chris returns three weeks later without Michelle. He reveals she has left him after a marriage proposal went wrong.

Michelle returns the following year to support Chris and convince him to fight back after his job as CEO is given to TK Samuels (Benjamin Mitchell).

== Petra Beaufort ==
Petra Beaufort
- Shortland Street character
- Portrayed by: Lucy Wyma
- Duration: 2020–2020
- Introduced by: Oliver Driver
In-universe information
- Mother: Michelle Beaufort

Petra Beaufort, played by Lucy Wyma made her first appearance in 2020. She is the estranged daughter of Michelle Beaufort (Lisa Chappell).

== Maeve Mullens ==
Maeve Mullens
- Shortland Street character
- Portrayed by: Jess Sayer
- Duration: 2020–present
- First appearance: 2020
- Introduced by: Oliver Driver
In-universe information
- Occupation: Nurse

Maeve Mullens, played by Jess Sayer made her first appearance in 2020. Maeve is a nurse. She had a same-sex marriage.

== Wilder Mullens ==
Wilder Mullens
- Shortland Street character
- Portrayed by: Darby McKessar (2022); Felix Jones (2020–2021)
- Duration: 2020–2022
- First appearance: 2020
- Introduced by: Oliver Driver
In-universe information
- Occupation: Nurse
- Parents: Maeve Mullens; Saskia Burgess
- Wife: Nicole Miller
- Children: Knox Lloyd-Mullens

Wilder Mullens, played by Felix Jones made his first appearance in 2020. The character was recast to Darby McKessar.

== Kiwa Adams-Samuels ==
Kiwa Adams-Samuels
- Shortland Street character
- Portrayed by: Hiwaiterangi Hiwa Dixon
- Duration: 2020–2025
- Introduced by: Oliver Driver
In-universe information
- Father: Eddie Adams
- Mother: Esther Samuels
- Daughters: Petra Freeth

Kiwa Adams-Samuels was played by Hiwaiterangi Hiwa Dixon. She is the daughter of Esther Samuels (Ngahuia Piripi) and Eddie Adams (Rawiri Jobe).

== Theodora Chang ==
Theodora Chang
- Shortland Street character
- Portrayed by: Chye-Ling Huang
- Duration: 2020–2021
- Introduced by: Oliver Driver
In-universe information
- Occupation: Paramedic
- Mother: Bernadette Chang

Theodora Chang was played by Chye-Ling Huang.
