= Lucy Rickman =

- Shortland Street character
- Portrayed by: Grace Palmer
- Duration: 2014–2017
- First appearance: 25 August 2014
- Last appearance: 30 May 2017
- Introduced by: Simon Bennett
In-universe information
- Occupation: Nurse
- Father: Glenn Rickman
- Husband: Ali Karim (2016–2017)
- Daughters: Lulu Karim

Lucy Karim (previously Rickman) is a fictional character on the New Zealand soap opera Shortland Street portrayed by Grace Palmer. She made her first screen appearance on the episode broadcast on 25 August 2014. She was introduced as a mysterious person with an obsession to the hospital CEO Rachel McKenna (Angela Bloomfield). It was later revealed that her father had an affair with Rachel ultimately destroying her family. Her storylines have focused mainly on her short-lived relationships, marriage with Ali Karim (Tane Williams-Accra), and her unsteady relationship with her father Glenn Rickman (Will Wallace).

== Casting ==
Grace Palmer, stepdaughter of entertainer Jason Gunn, was cast as new nurse Lucy Rickman. Palmer was living in Sydney when asked to audition for Shortland Street in June 2014. She was later told she had gotten the part by her New Zealand manager. Palmer had previously been taking acting classes in Sydney beforehand and has appeared as a guest in Home and Away. Palmer had previously worked as a waitress in Kings Cross six-weeks before she was cast. Palmer made her first appearance as Lucy on 25 August 2014.

== Storylines ==
Lucy begins working at the hospital and it was clear she had an unhealthy obsession with hospital CEO Rachel McKenna (Angela Bloomfield) when she breaks into her house. When eventually confronted, it turns out Lucy despised Rachel for having an affair with her father Glenn in ten years beforehand, ultimately breaking up her parents marriage. The two began to grow close and Lucy moved in with Rachel, adopting a mother-daughter-like relationship. Lucy became best friends with Bella Durville (Amelia Reid-Meredith) but fell in love with her fiancé Dallas Adams (Cameron Jones), kissing him and destroying his engagement to Bella.

She starts a relationship with Alex Dean (Richard Osbourne). However Lucy soon discovers he is gay and then helps him come to terms with his sexuality. She then starts to date Curtis Hannah (Jayden Daniels) despite his dodgy activity. She is later shocked to find he is cheating on her and when he is arrested for been in position of drugs, she leaves him. She starts to fall in love with Curtis' friend Ali Karim (Tane Williams-Accra). However Ali is engaged and deeply religious, causing him to get ostracized from his family when he chose Lucy over his fiancée through an Arranged marriage.

Lucy's father Glenn Rickman (Will Wallace) arrives, under the pretense of getting closer to his daughter. Lucy and Ali marry. Ali suffers a head injury from being in a car accident. His personality changes with him becoming unpredictable, moody and easily agitated to the point of being violent. They briefly separate but eventually get back together after Ali recovers. Lucy gets pregnant and the couple expect a baby girl.

After several earthquake tremors Lucy and Ali feel unsafe in their flat and decide to leave Ferndale and move into Lucy's family Bach. Whilst at Chris Warner (Michael Galvin)'s 50th Birthday, she starts having labour contractions. Ali decides to drive her to hospital but then gets stuck in traffic because of a volcanic eruption. Lucy gives birth to their daughter in the car. Eventually making it to hospital she suffers postnatal internal bleeding. Her uterus had ruptured and she had to be rushed into theatre where Finn Connelly (Lukas Whiting) performs surgery on her including a hysterectomy. However, following the surgery, Lucy goes into cardiac arrest and dies soon after. She was later shown as a corpse as Ali, Esther and Kylie bid their farewells.

== Character development ==
=== Characterisation ===
Palmer described her character as "mysterious to begin with". It was also said that her character "arrives with a bang". Palmer also commented that as her characters arrival storyline progresses her actions would become clearer. She was introduced as stalker to Rachel McKenna and arrives uninvited at Sarah Potts (Amanda Billing)'s funeral, overhearing Rachel tell Harper Whitley (Ria Vandervis) the security code to their house. She breaks into Rachel's house and searches through Rachel's belongings along with taking an interest in her family photos. She later goes about getting a job at the hospital and immediately starts investigating Rachel. She later confronts Rachel and blames her for spitting up her mother and fathers marriage, she tells Rachel that it was all down to her actions that her parents had split up.

=== Departure ===
Nearing three years on the show, Palmer had decided to leave Shortland Street and her character was killed off during the shows 25th anniversary episode. She wrote in a post on Instagram following her departure; "At the tender age of 19, I was gifted the most incredible opportunity ever. To the cast, crew, friends, family and fans, I'm so glad we did this together, and as sad as it is to say goodbye to my friend... I know it's time for me and Lucy to part. This experience has been a gift. The best nearly 3 years of my life, and I know it'll be hard to beat."
