= Finn Warner =

Fictional character on the New Zealand soap opera Shortland Street

- Shortland Street character
- Portrayed by: Uncredited actor (1993); Lukas Whiting (2016–)
- Duration: 1993, 2016–18, 2022, 2024, 2026–
- First appearance: 11 October 1993
- Introduced by: Brian Lenanne (1993); Simon Bennett (2016); Oliver Driver (2022, 2024, 2026)
In-universe information
- Occupation: Surgeon
- Father: Chris Warner
- Mother: Carrie Burton-Connelly
- Brothers: Frank Warner
- Sisters: Sass Warner
- Half-brothers: Phoenix Raynor; Harry Warner; James Warner
- Half-sisters: Trinity Kwan
- Wife: Esther Samuels (2018–19)
- Grandfathers: Sir Bruce Warner
- Grandmothers: Margot, Lady Warner
- Uncles: Guy Warner
- Aunts: Amanda Warner
- Nieces: Amelie Warner
- First cousins: Tuesday Warner; Kelly Piper (possibly)
- Other relatives: Isaac Worthington; Joseph Worthington

Finbar "Finn" Warner (also Burton and Connelly) is a fictional character on the New Zealand soap opera Shortland Street. Finn was originally played by an uncredited baby actor in 1993 before Lukas Whiting took over the role in 2016. Whiting left the soap in 2018, but made returns in 2022, 2024 and 2026.

== Creation and casting ==
The character of Finn was introduced in 1993 during a plot in which "robo nurse" Carrie Burton (Lisa Crittenden) fell pregnant after receiving 3 different sperm donations from central characters. This was billed as a "whodunit" with nurse Steve Mills (Andrew Binns), Guy Warner (Craig Parker), Dr. Hone Ropata (Temuera Morrison) and Dr. Chris Warner (Michael Galvin) all potentially being the father. The character made his first appearance on 11 October 1993, when Carrie gave birth to him and his triplet siblings. The birth was used as a storyline to write off the character of Carrie, and she departed with her triplets on 11 November 1993. In 2015 producers contacted the agents of Australian actor, Lukas Whiting. Whiting was unaware of the show, "I had to do a whole lot of research quickly, I watched a couple of episodes on YouTube, shot what we call a 'self tape' and a couple of weeks later got a call from my agent saying you start in a couple of weeks!"

The character was reintroduced under the name "Finn Connelly" as a new recruit at the hospital in 2016 in a storyline that the Surgeon billed as "the new Dr. Love" and raised questions on his relation to Chris Warner. Whiting began filming in late 2015 with Finn being revealed as Chris' long lost son. Whiting appreciated being able to work alongside Galvin (Chris Warner) and Angela Bloomfield (Rachel McKenna), noting his storylines allowed him to "make good friends with some of the younger cast as well as some of the older." Finn made his reappearance on 28 March 2016. He made his final appearance on 1 October 2018. Whiting reprised the role for several cameo appearances in the years following, including in May 2022, for Shortland Street's 30th anniversary, and again in the 2024 Christmas cliffhanger, alongside several members of his on-screen family.

In 2026, Whiting reprised the role for a more substantial return to Shortland Street, nearly a decade after Finn's departure from the regular cast. The return formed part of the show's "Reunion" season and reunited Finn with his father, Chris Warner. Whiting, said that working with Galvin again was a significant factor in his decision to reprise the role, describing the experience of returning to the character as "just like riding a bike".

== Storylines ==
Desperate to have children but with no stable partner in her life, Shortland Street clinic's head of nursing Carrie Burton (Lisa Crittenden) accepted sperm donations from nurse Steve Mills (Andrew Binns), Guy Warner (Craig Parker), Dr. Hone Ropata (Temuera Morrison) and Dr. Chris Warner (Michael Galvin); refusing to disclose whose sperm she used. She fell pregnant and married Steve's father Declan Kennedy (Kevin J. Wilson). Carrie gave birth to triplets during good friend Meredith Fleming's (Stephanie Wilkin) leaving party and named them, Finbar, Frank, and Sarah. Declan proved to be a useless father and ended up fleeing the country to escape criminal associates he had, leaving Steve to be a surrogate parent. It turned out Sarah had a hole in her heart and came close to death during surgery. Carrie decided to flee Ferndale after receiving threats from Declan's criminal past, taking her triplets with her and leaving Steve (who had decided the children were likely his) heart broken. Several months later Steve was devastated to realise Chris had discovered he was the father and had been visiting Carrie and the triplets in Australia. This caused a rivalry between the two that ultimately led to Steve driving off the road, killing himself and TP Aleni (Elizabeth Skeen) in an explosion. In November 1995 Chris visited Carrie and the triplets so that he could introduce his father Bruce (Ken Blackburn) to them before he succumbed to terminal cancer.

Upon return, Shortland Street CEO Rachel McKenna (Angela Bloomfield) hired Finn Connelly as the newest surgeon at the hospital and he instantly turned heads for his playboy ways, landing the title "Dr. Love". On his first day on the job, Finn shockingly introduced himself to Chris as one of his long lost triplets. After his mother died, he had decided to get to know his father. After initially clashing with Rachel, Finn moved in with the Warner's and entered a love triangle, when he began to date Esther Samuels (Ngahuia Piripi) much to the annoyance of her recent ex-boyfriend Curtis Hannah (Jayden Daniels). Finn and Esther struggled due to her financial worries and ultimately she left him for Curtis. Finn's fellow triplets, Frank (Luke Patrick) and Sass (Lucy Lovegrove) arrived in Ferndale and joined him at Chris' house. Finn and Esther reunited following Curtis' incarceration and Finn found a job acting as a television doctor, winning admiration from fans. This led to the obsessed teenager Ashley Whitley (Ruby Lyon) to falsely claim he had inappropriate sexual interactions with her after he rejected her advances. Finn ended up quitting the television role when he began to be aggressively stalked, leading to the male stalker breaking into his house and touching him in his sleep. It would soon be revealed that the stalker was new orderly Jason Kirkpatrick (Thomas Sainsbury) who claimed to be madly in love with Finn. After Jason kidnapped Esther, he was arrested much to Finn's relief. Himself, Sass, and Frank decided to adopt the Warner last name moments before Chris Warner was officially tested cancer-free.

Finn and Esther married in early 2018 and planned to pursue new careers in Detroit but following Finn's decision to drink drive, he severely injured Head of Nursing Nicole (Sally Martin) and lost the opportunity alongside his job at Shortland Street and his friendships. Angry and increasingly violent due to the punishments, Finn began to physically abuse Esther. This continued to escalate and despite Esther's intention to fix the marriage, Finn removed himself from the relationship. Following investigation from the hospital into his actions, Finn began to work as a bartender and controversially realised a mutual love to Chris' pregnant partner Zoe (Holly Shervey). Desperate not to upset Chris, Finn did not pursue his feelings and eventually returned to his role as a doctor. Chris soon realised the mutual feelings and disowned Finn from the Warner family. Finn decided to pursue humanitarian work with Sass and departed Ferndale after a loving farewell to Zoe. In 2019 Chris visited Finn overseas and announced the two had reconciled. Finn would return in 2024 with his brother and his uncle Guy to return the then fugitive Harry to their father.

== Reception ==
The addition of Carrie's triplet storyline was praised for showing a "softer side" to the otherwise "stern matron". The return of Finn and his siblings was said to "delight" Shortland Street fans. Upon arrival in 2016, Finn was labelled a "heartthrob" and the show's "number one hunk". He quickly attained the title of "Dr. Love", a label formerly associated with Chris. Tara Ward from The Spinoff website announced that Finn's arrival had turned the show into "peak stud". Whiting had not been aware of the level of popularity of the show but came to realise it quickly, "After the first week I started to get recognised - it's quite a lot of fun - you get your good fans and bad fans but it's always fun getting photos and having a chat on the streets." Actor Michael Galvin (Dr. Chris Warner) named the triplet's returns in 2016 as his favourite storyline, noting Whiting's "amazing" acting and "fun" the co-stars have on set. He also aspired for the triplet's to remain on the show for a "long time to come". Following Whiting's departure, Galvin called for the actor's return calling the 3 triplet actors "fantastic" and how he "loved working with them."
