= Jenny Ludlam =

New Zealand actress (b. 1951)

Jenny Ludlam MNZM
- Born: Jennifer Kay Ludlam; 23 July 1951 (age 75); Taumarunui, New Zealand
- Occupations: Actress; television presenter

Jennifer Kay Ludlam MNZM (born 23 July 1951 in Taumarunui, New Zealand) is a New Zealand-born actress, who remains best known for her roles in Australian television.

== Acting roles ==
In Australia, she was a regular cast member in the short-lived soap opera Waterloo Station (1983) followed by guest stints on Prisoner (as Janice Grant in 1985), and Sons and Daughters. She was also a presenter on the long-running ABC children's TV series Play School. Returning to New Zealand, Ludlam has had roles in several television shows, movies and theatre productions.

== Honours ==
In the 2005 New Year Honours, Ludlam was appointed a Member of the New Zealand Order of Merit, for services to the theatre.

== Filmography ==
=== Film ===
Year	Title	Role	Notes
1996	Gravity & Grace	Ceal	
2008	Second Hand Wedding	Doctor	
2008	Apron Springs	Lorna	
2011	Hauraki	Bev	Short

=== Television ===
Year	Title	Role	Notes
1976	The Park Terrace Murder	Catherine Glynn	TV film
1978	Gather Your Dreams	Brenda	TV series
1978	Radio Waves	Kate Webster	TV series
1980	Prisoner	Cheryl Scott	Episodes: "1.154", "1.156"
1981	Mortimer's Patch	Beverly Marquand	Episode: "Tagged"
1981	Bellamy	Mary Stokes	Episode: "The Bank You Can Trust"
1982	A Country Practice	Mary Watson	Episodes: "Stirring the Possum: Parts 1 & 2"
1984	Carson's Law	Helen Ferguson	Episode: "Virtue Defiled"
1984-1986	Play School	Presenter	TV series
1985	Prisoner	Janice Grant	Recurring role
1985	Cuckoo Land	Petunia	TV series
1986	Sons and Daughters	Micky Pratt	Recurring role
1989–90	Shark in the Park	Diane, Josie Tucker	Episodes: "Lamb to the Slaughter", "Ten-Zero, Dingo"
1991	Undercover	Sandy	TV film
1992, 2010, 2011, 2014–2023	Shortland Street	Beverly Lucas, Leanne Black-Johnson	Minor role, Regular role
1993	Typhon's People	Annie	TV film
1994	Hercules and the Amazon Women	Alcmene	TV film
1999	A Twist in the Tale	Sylvia	Episode: "The Pirate"
2006	The Amazing Extraordinary Friends	Cyclone	Episode: "Wormwood"
2012	Golden		TV series
2013	The Blue Rose	Sonya Whitwell	Main role
