= List of Shortland Street characters introduced in 2019 =

Shortland Street is a New Zealand television soap opera. It was first broadcast on 25 May 1992 and currently airs on television network TVNZ 2. The following is a list of characters that appeared on the show in 2019 by order of first appearance. All characters are introduced by the show's executive producer Maxine Fleming. The 27th season of Shortland Street began airing on 14 January 2019.

== Prince Kimiora ==
Prince Kimiora
- Shortland Street character
- Portrayed by: Jay Kiriona
- Duration: 2019–2021
- First appearance: 15 March 2019
- Last appearance: 9 September 2021
- Introduced by: Maxine Fleming
In-universe information
- Occupation: Nurse
- Brothers: Lincoln Kimiora; Winston Kimiora
- Nieces: Kiri Miller

Prince Kimiora, played by Jay Kiriona made his first appearance on 15 March 2019.

Prince first appears in the IV after Kylie kissed Drew and Drew ran off, they meet and they have a one-night stand. Prince then asks Kylie for all her dirty secrets and Kylie kicks him out of her house. He then applies to be a nurse and Kylie turns him down, Lincoln comes to his rescue and makes Kylie hire him, which is where Prince finds out that Lincoln is addicted to meth, and tries to help him. Prince falls in love with receptionist Angel and when Angel breaks up with Eddie, they become a couple.

Unfortunately, Angel takes her friend, Gracie, to Australia. Dawn has become all emotional that she is not pregnant because of the sperm donation from Ali's frozen sperm, and she kisses Prince. When Angel returns, they throw an engagement party, and Prince calls her a hoe, and then reveals he kissed Dawn. Angel breaks up with Prince.

== Zara Rolleston ==
Zara Rolleston
- Shortland Street character
- Portrayed by: Nivi Summer
- Duration: 2019-2021
- First appearance: 10 April 2019
- Last appearance: 16 September 2021
- Introduced by: Maxine Fleming
In-universe information
- Occupation: Cardiologist; Former taxi driver
- Husband: Jav Mandal (divorced); Boyd Rolleston (2020-)
- Sons: Manish Mandal Remus Rolleston Romulus Rolleston
- Daughters: Rani Mandal Raya Chakraborty

Zara Chakraborty, played by Nivi Summer, made her first screen appearance on 10 April 2019.

Zara first appears as Chris' taxi driver to a DHB meeting, and when they discover Kate has been in a car crash, Zara rushes to her help. Chris hires her as a cardiologist, and Zara's family from India are revealed to be watching her. On 22 April, Zara's daughter Rani arrives and her husband Jav sends someone to capture Rani, which is foiled by Chris and the police. A month after Chris and Zara started dating, Chris hired a surgeon who Jav used to work with named Simon Ashton, Rani gets sick and Chris and Simon perform a surgery on Rani. However, Simon has an alcohol addiction and is hungover. After the surgery Chris and Zara break up when he reveals he hired Simon from Jav. After Simon was fired due to his alcoholism almost killed Rani, she managed a hostile takeover of Jav's pharmaceutical company by blackmailing him, thus becoming a board member of Shortland Street as a stakeholder and supply partner.

After breaking up with Chris, Zara and doctor Boyd Rolleston (now Chakraborty) admit they have feelings for each other, but do not really have any chemistry and agree to stay friends. In July 2019 she dated nurse Nicole Miller for just under a month, however she broke up with her after her ex-husband Javs return, who was being threatening towards Zara. Jav leaves New Zealand when he buys Rani a car and she crashes it. Chris and Zara become a couple after Chris performed a life saving surgery on Rani after the car crash.

Zara and Chris get back together after a while, and in November, Rani kisses Louis King. Zara finds out and Rani tells her that she loves him, Rani becomes upset when she finds out that Louis does not have feelings for her.

In December, Zara tried to get Boyd's niece, Shereez Baker, to leave Tim Myers, but is met with his racist remarks. By the time Shereez finally leaves him, Tim sets a bomb in the hospital and a stolen ambulance, taking Zara and Boyd hostage. Boyd and Zara survive the explosion, leading the two to admit their love for each other and get together early in the year. Zara ends up proposing to Boyd after previously stating she didn't want to get married, and they have their wedding in August 2020. Zara decided to change her surname back to her maiden name Chakraborty, with Boyd also taking her name.

In January 2021, Boyd's ex, Eve Reston, returns, having a terminal illness and not long to live. Boyd eventually admits he is still in love with Eve despite still loving Zara, leaving Zara unsure of what to do. They stayed together after Eve passes away, and Zara promises to be a mother to Eve and Boyd's twins. Not long after, Zara gets involved in the fight against sex trafficking, working with Theo Chang and Michelle Beaufort to save women from being trafficked. Zara is very vocal with the campaign, speaking on the news and going very public. However, while speaking at an anti trafficking rally, Zara is shot by the people behind it. She survives, however this does not push her to give up. After her and Boyd decide to buy a vineyard and move down south, she receives a text from a woman asking for her help. She drives out to save the woman but ends up trapped with the men and is then abducted by them. In the next couple of days, the body of the woman she went to save is found, but Zara's body is not. She is presumed dead, but a body has not been found to prove it. On July 23 It was revealed three months later that Zara was killed soon after being kidnapped.

However, in the final moments of September 8 episode after the departure of her daughter this was revealed to be untrue, she is alive and pregnant. This coincides with Nivi's real-life pregnancy. Reuniting with Boyd, they moved down to Otago to inherit a winery. Word soon comes that Zara gives birth to a healthy baby girl, Raya. In 2024, Boyd returns to work at Shortland St as a locum and reveals that Zara has left him and taken Raya with her.

== Cece King ==
Cecelia "Cece" King
- Shortland Street character
- Portrayed by: Nicole Whippy
- Duration: 2019–2023
- First appearance: 29 April 2019
- Last appearance: 21 December 2023
- Introduced by: Maxine Fleming
In-universe information
- Occupation: Former Social worker nurse
- Husband: Ben King (2001-2020) (divorced) TK Samuels (2022-)
- Daughters: Sophia King Tillie Potts stepdaughter
- Stepsons: Louis King; Tommy King Daniel Potts

Cecelia King, played by Nicole Whippy, made her first screen appearance on 25 April 2019.

Cece first appears after Jean appears in hospital after a diagnosis with Alzheimer's disease. When Jean dies, her husband Ben sexually assaults Esther. Cece and Ben fight, causing Sophia to burn Esther's car. They make up, and she reveals to her son Louis, that he had a twin brother. Louis' birth mother, Vanessa shows up and Vanessa gets mad at Cece for driving her to kill herself and Louis' brother. She also gets hots for TK Samuels in October.

In November, Sophia has a boyfriend named Manaia, whose father is being investigated by Oranga Tamariki. When his father is taken in by the police for abusing Manaia. Manaia and his brother are left without anywhere to go, so TK organises for a pasifika community to surprise Manaia. Cece is happy and shares a kiss with TK.

Then in December, after Manaia cheated on Sophia and Cece revealed to Ben that she cheated with TK. Cece and Sophia go on a "man-free" bush walk with Dawn and Shareez, where they accidentally run into Dawn's ex, Jake. Jake gets shot by two hunters, Bronnie and Pete, who have had weed stolen by Jake. The hunters want to shoot Sophia, and the male one wants to rape her. Cece and Shareez rush Bronnie and Sophia sets Pete on fire. Cece, Dawn and Shareez lie to Detective Rashid Namal that Sophia burnt Pete by accident.

In February, Bronnie comes back for revenge on the four, and reveals to the four she has breast cancer. Cece, Dawn and Shareez organise for Bronnie to have an operation under a fake ID, and she goes. After an incident at school, Cece makes a MyLife account called "Kirk" to look out for Sophia, and in March, she reveals to Sophia that it was her running the account, and she confesses to TK and Ben that Pete's death wasn't an accident, and Ben wants Sophia to get justice for what she did. Ben heavily drinks after hearing the news, and turns on the stove to make dinner. Ben talks to Sophia when she gets home and they both dose of to sleep, and the house sets on fire (which was caused by Ben). Sophia has no injuries but Ben gets smoke inhalation, and he dies later.

Cece can't stop suspecting Sophia caused the fire, and at Ben's funeral, Sophia lashes at Cece proclaiming that she thinks she killed Ben. They make up and Sophia turns herself in over the death of Pete. Sophia is sentenced to counselling in her court trial.

Cece married TK in September 2022. Following a shooting at the hospital, TK is left severely injured and required long term rehabilitation. Cece and TK leave Shortland Street in June 2023 to undertake the rehab closer to TK’s family in the country. Cece makes a few cameo appearances in December to be a bridesmaid for Madonna and attend Chris Warner’s New Years Eve boat party.

== Ben King ==
Ben King
- Shortland Street character
- Portrayed by: Jamie Irvine
- Duration: 2019–20
- First appearance: 25 April 2019
- Last appearance: 30 March 2020
- Introduced by: Maxine Fleming
In-universe information
- Occupation: Doctor
- Mother: Jean King
- Wife: Vanessa King (until 2001); Cece King (2001–2020)
- Sons: Blue Nathan; Louis King; Tommy King
- Daughters: Sophia King

Ben King, played by Jamie Irvine, made his first screen appearance on 25 April 2019. Ben arrived with wife Cece (Nicole Whippy), son Louis (Henry Rolleston) and daughter Sophia (Iana Grace) when it became apparent his mother Jean (Catherine Wilkin) was entering a stage of severe Alzheimer's. Jean ended her own life and a traumatised Ben began heavily drinking. After getting drunk and ending up in bed with Esther Samuels (Ngahuia Piripi), Esther withdrew her consent but was raped by Ben. After a tumultuous period of losing his friends and nearly his family, Esther did not press charges. Ben and Cece soon had to reveal that Louis was a twin, with his brother having been murdered by his biological mother Vanessa (Danielle Mason). Vanessa returned and turned Louis against his family, though he soon forgave them but was seriously injured whilst surfing and confined to a wheel chair.

Later in the year Ben was concerned when Sophia fell for co-worker Kate's (Laurel Devenue) son Blue Nathan (Tash Keddy). After a DNA test it was revealed Blue was in fact Ben's son after a one-night stand in the nineties. Ben became paranoid when he realised Cece shared a kiss with his boss TK Samuels (Benjamin Mitchell) and was devastated when his family was held hostage and Sophia killed a man in apparent self defence. Two months later Cece revealed it was not self defence and Sophia had in fact murdered the man. Struggling with the news, Ben began to drink heavily. After a heart-to-heart with Sophia, Ben drunkenly fell asleep with the oven on and set the house alight. Sophia managed to get him out of the house but he developed hypoxia due to smoke inhalation. He died after going into ventricular fibrilation.

== Louis King ==
Louis King-Samuels
- Shortland Street character
- Portrayed by: Henry Rolleston
- Duration: 2019–2022
- First appearance: 25 April 2019
- Introduced by: Maxine Fleming
In-universe information
- Occupation: Student, Barista (former), Hospital orderly, Nurse
- Father: Ben King (father) TK Samuels (stepfather)
- Mother: Vanessa King (biological mother) Cece King (stepmother)
- Brothers: Tommy King
- Half-brothers: Blue Nathan Daniel Potts (stepbrother)
- Half-sisters: Sophia King Tillie Potts (step sister)
- Grandmothers: Jean King (biological grandmother) Liz Arthur (step grandmother)

Louis King, played by Henry Rolleston, made his first screen appearance on 25 April 2019. Louis first appears when his family come to Ferndale after his grandmother, Jean is diagnosed with Alzheimer's. Louis looks after his sister, Sophia after she sets a retirement village on fire and also looks after Zara's daughter, Rani, when she starts Ferndale High, which causes Rani to develop a crush on Louis. Louis starts dating Shereez, which makes Rani jealous and after the death of a 5 year old named Tommy, his father confesses that he had a twin named Tommy. His birth mother Vanessa shows up and blames Cece for her attempted suicide and the death of Louis' twin brother. Thanks to Vanessa, Louis goes to Drew's and stays there for a while. Shereez become pregnant with his baby, and he breaks up with Shereez as he wants to be with a girl at his school.

In December, he saved Shereez from Tim Myers' final abuse by temporarily putting him under arrest, while trying to foil River from a misogynistic internet group chat and initiating a second bomb planted in the hospital.

He recovered in February, but was unable to get his old job as a barista, as he tried to earn money to try becoming a pro surfer again. Instead, he was persuaded to work as an orderly. Louis was never able to get over the grief of Ben's death in March 2020. On July 10, 2020, he returned to IV Café as a barista after Petra, Michelle Beaufort's daughter, in fixing her coffee orders when she was trialled as a sole-charge café manager. He has a thing with Shereez for a while and saves her from her creepy flatmate Colin, and then she leaves for the Chatham Islands. He and Petra then have a relationship, and when Petra tells him she is leaving for Queenstown, he wants to go with her but is held back because he still cares about Shereez.

In 2021, Louis' friend Theodora Chang is having problems getting over Nicole's wife, Maeve, so he decides to have sex with her, and they start a relationship. Louis goes to Drew's to smoke weed, but when Drew's adopted son Marley's social worker comes around, Drew asks Louis to take the marijuana with him, and he starts growing a batch in his room. This becomes a problem when Louis makes weed fudge, and TK accidentally eats some when Louis tells him specifically not to. TK gets mad and the two have a big fight, However they make up after TK and Cece go away for a couple of weeks. Louis begins to have more problems with his family after they all (but him) forget the anniversary of Ben's death. However, this is also patched up quickly too. Louis then gets involved in drug dealing business with the gang the iron dogs and his mother pays the price, Cece King later on gets bet up by the gang members.

== Sophia King ==
Sophia King-Samuels
- Shortland Street character
- Portrayed by: Iana Grace
- Duration: 2019–21, 2022
- First appearance: 25 April 2019
- Last appearance: 15 September 2022
- Introduced by: Maxine Fleming
In-universe information
- Occupation: High School Student

Sophia King-Samuels, played by Iana Grace, made her first screen appearance on 25 April 2019.

Sophia arrives in Ferndale from Byron Bay so that her family can look after Jean, her nan with Alzheimer's. Her father, Ben thinks its best if Jean goes to an old folks home in Ferndale, but Sophia does not want this. To stop Jean from going there, she burns down the retirement home. Her father puts her on some drugs to make her feel better as she has problems. She befriends a girl at her school named Rani, who is Zara's daughter. When Jean dies and Kylie accuses Ben of raping Esther, she defends Ben by burning Esther's car.

Later, in October, she meets Blue Nathan, who she falls for. Ben King has a strange feeling about Blue and then tells Sophia and Blue that they can't date because Blue is the child of Ben and Kate. Heartbroken, she eventually falls for boy in her school named Manaia. Her mother Cece is a social worker, and after an accident between Manaia and his father, She plans for Manaia to be taken by Oranga Tamariki. Sophia is upset by this decision and runs away with Manaia. They both return and Manaia is taken back by his father and Sophia remained close friends with him. In December, Manaia was seen cheating on Sophia, so her pyromaniacal tendency resurfaces.

On the season-ending cliffhanger, she burnt Pete, after trying to save herself from being raped, and saving Cece from getting shot. Pete died. Due to her history as a pyromaniac, she was also a subject of bullying in February, 2020. She even befriended Kirk, who was Cece's imaginary friend for her to as a way to open up. She threatened to kill Cece when she found out Kirk's true identity, and also Ben for trying to lock her up. On 25 March, however, Ben died from smoke inhalation, but from a fire caused by him. In May 2021 Sophie leaves Ferndale to be with her aunt Aggie on her death bed she decided to stay there for good after her death.

Sophia returns to Ferndale sixteen months later in September 2022 for TK and Cece's wedding.

== Angel Schmidt ==
Angel Schmidt
- Shortland Street character
- Portrayed by: Ana Scotney
- First appearance: 9 May 2019
- Last appearance: 22 October 2019
- Introduced by: Maxine Fleming
In-universe information
- Occupation: Student
- Mother: Desdemona Schmidt

Angel Schmidt, played by Ana Scotney, made her first screen appearance on 9 May 2019. Angel is hired as a receptionist and she falls for Prince, after she and Prince have sex in the workplace, she dumps him. She then starts dating Eddie and while Eddie organises a music festival called Reko, however, he falls short of money and is chased by an angry mob, where he abandons Angel. She dumps Eddie, and then her mother, Desdemona has sex with Eddie, and she falls out with her mother. Her best friend Gracie, is rushed to ED after being diagnosed with MND, and she reconciles with her and gets back together with Prince. Prince proposes to her on 19 September and she accepts. Unfortunately while Angel was away in Thailand, sorting out problems with her Mum, Prince ended up kissing Dawn after she had a total meltdown when she was watching Ali's daughter, Lulu for the day but the little girl had wandered off somewhere in the hospital grounds. Luckily she was found at the main entrance with an ambulance officer. Both Prince and Dawn regret it and things become awkward between them with Prince insisting that he loved Angel with all his heart and Dawn wanting to talk about it. However Prince's brother, Winston knew about it and forces his brother to come clean with Angel. After several further complications in their relationship, Angel would dump Prince, before departing for a new job in In October.

== Eddie Adams ==
Eddie Adams
- Shortland Street character
- Portrayed by: Rawiri Jobe
- Duration: 2019–2021, 2024
- First appearance: 24 May 2019
- Last appearance: 5 July 2024 Episode 7958
- Introduced by: Maxine Fleming
In-universe information
- Occupation: Paramedic
- Father: Willy Marsh William Miller (step father) Howard Black (ex stepfather) Damo Johnson (ex stepfather)
- Mother: Leanne Miller
- Half-brothers: Eric Miller
- Half-sisters: Nicole Miller
- Sons: Kiwa Adams-Samuels
- Nephews: Pele Kruse Wilder Mullens Michael Kruse
- Nieces: Kiri Miller (deceased)

Eddie Adams, played by Rawiri Jobe made his first screen appearance on 24 May 2019. Eddie first appears after Damo and Nicole finally track him down, he and Leanne have a reunion, and Eddie starts job as a Paramedic. He settles in Ferndale and starts dating Angel, and Eddie organises a festival called Reko, and when he falls short of money for bands to play at his festival, he is chased by an angry mob, where he abandoned Angel. After an argument with Leanne, he runs off and is rushed into ED shortly afterwards. He is diagnosed with bipolar disorder, and accidentally sleeps with Angel's mother. He makes up with Leanne and to make sure he can pay back Leanne the money for Reko, he becomes a janitor at the hospital. He saves someone's life while he is the janitor and is reinstated at his position as a Paramedic.

He starts a relationship with Esther Samuels in October and later in the month, Esther becomes pregnant with his baby. To celebrate, he travels to Hawaii to meet Leanne. He returns to an angry TK, however, Esther forgives him.

In April, Esther gives birth to their baby, named Kiwa Addams-Samuels, and a few weeks later at a picnic, four teenagers on the streets steal their food and Eddie realises that these children are being hunted down by a man in a white van, Eddie steps up and tries to protect those children, and when he lets them stay, TK forces the children to leave, causing Wade (one of the children) to be injured badly and drugged by the man in the white van.

In May 2021, Eddie's father Willy fell sick and his girlfriend persuaded Eddie to tend to his fathers aid. After Eddie announces he's leaving Ferndale with Kiwa, Esther is left furious and the two prepare for a custody battle only for Esther to realise Kiwa is better off with Eddie. Eddie departed Ferndale on May 13 after finally clearing the air with Esther.

Eddie made a brief cameo in July 2024, appearing on an iPad to say goodbye to Leanne who was dying from bowel cancer.

== Shereez Baker ==
Shereez Baker
- Shortland Street character
- Portrayed by: Timmie Cameron
- Duration: 2019–20, 2022
- First appearance: 22 July 2019
- Introduced by: Maxine Fleming
In-universe information
- Occupation: Nurse
- Father: Alisdair Rolleston
- Grandfathers: Alisdair Rolleston
- Grandmothers: Susan Rolleston
- Uncles: Boyd Rolleston
- Aunts: Mallory Rolleston
- First cousins: Romulus Rolleston Reston; Remus Rolleston Reston

Shereez first arrives in Ferndale in July, and gets a job as a nurse. When Boyd loses an opportunity to go to Japan for a month to do some medicinal business, she flirts with the winner and gets in trouble. She then starts flirting with Prince Kimiora and even tries to come onto him. In August, she starts a relationship with Louis King and accidentally gets pregnant with Louis' baby. Louis believes in climate change and the world ending soon, so he tells her to get an abortion. They break up and Shereez gets the abortion. In November, she starts a relationship with control freak and abusive Tim Myers, who in December, proposes to her and says "I love you, Shereez, you have to be mine forever" Shereez talks to Sam Collins, Kylie's psychiatrist for help. Shereez tells Tim that she wants to break up with him and Tim tries to abuse her but is stopped by Louis.

In the finale of 2019, she goes on a "man free" bush walk with Cece, Sophia and Dawn and they run into Jake, Dawn's prisoner ex-boyfriend. Jake gets shot and they run into a hut, where they discover two hunters who Jake stole their weed. They threaten to kill the four and Jake, but she and Dawn rush the hunters and Sophia lights the hunters on fire. When being interviewed by the police about the incident, Cece tells them to stick with that Sophia was using the fire as self-defence. And Shareez learns that Boyd was in the ambulance with Tim Myers, and that Tim died and Boyd is in surgery. Boyd lives, however, much to Shareez' delight

Shereez begins to flirt with Frank Warner, and at one point, tries to kiss him on top of the tables at the IV, but Frank moves out of the way and Shareez loses her two front teeth.

== Sam Collins ==
Sam Collins
- Shortland Street character
- Portrayed by: Jared Turner
- Duration: 2019, 2026-
- First appearance: August 2019
- Introduced by: Maxine Fleming (2019); Oliver Driver (2026)
In-universe information
- Occupation: Psychologist

Sam Collins , played by Jared Turner, made his first screen appearance in August 2019. after Kylie Brown has a breakdown after killing her husband Dylan Reinhart.

He believes it is best if they give Kylie shock therapy, and he does so. Later, in November, he returns after a car crash and Dawn asks him if he knows how to treat sex addicts, because she believes she is one. And in December, he decides that he likes Kylie, much to TK's disgust. Shereez Baker is upset with her relationship with controlling, abusive Tim Myers, and asks Sam for advice. This angers Tim, so he beats up Sam.

Sam would appear again, 7 years later assigned to Cody Munroe (Jordan Mooney), who had been suffering from episodes of Disassociative Identity Disorder he couldn't recall.

== Marty Walker ==
Marty Walker is a doctor working in paediatrics at Shortland Street hospital. Having been there since the end of 2019, he has been in several relationships, most notably marrying Esther Samuels (Ngahuia Piripi). He is played by Scott Smart.

== Tess Hutchinson ==
Tess Hutchison
- Shortland Street character
- Portrayed by: Becky McEwan
- Duration: 2019–2022
- First appearance: 6 December 2019
- Last appearance: 20 July 2022
- Introduced by: Maxine Fleming
In-universe information
- Mother: Megan Hutchison (deceased)
- Husband: Tom Griffiths (2021–2022)
- Daughters: Amelie Warner

Tess Hutchison, played by Becky McEwan, made her first appearance on 6 December 2019. She arrives in Ferndale at the Warner Manion as the girlfriend of Phoenix Warner. She helps to get Zara Mandal to hospital after she collapses and it is revealed that Tess is pregnant with Phoenix's baby. On 19 December 2019, the couple welcome their baby daughter, Amelie.

In 2020, she starts nursing at the hospital, and discovers that Phoenix took 1 million dollars from the hospital. Phoenix is worried, and Tess convinces him to stay in Ferndale and confess to Chris, but Phoenix makes a runner to Santiago, leaving Tess and the baby behind.

In March 2020, she starts to develop feelings for Prince Kimiora and also becomes extremely cagey about her side of the family. She and Prince share a kiss and later decide to start a relationship (in reality, the actors of Prince and Tess are married themselves). Phoenix later returns but dies that October.

In 2021, she fell for Tom, the anaesthetist, and her mother, Megan returns, but also with Tess' abusive stepfather, Richard. Tess tried to use Phoenix's money to fund a new drug for her mother's bowel cancer treatment, so long as she leaves Richard for good, but she developed an allergic reaction, so she had to go for surgery.

In the 2021 cliffhanger, although Megan managed to witness Tess' wedding to Tom, both Megan and Tess were stabbed by Richard at the wedding reception, While Megan didn't make it, Tess was in a critical way and was rushed to surgery, Tess pulls through the surgery, but as they are closing her up she suffers complications from another tear and goes into cardiac arrest, despite best efforts to revive her, she dies, leaving Amelie orphaned. Amelie is now looked after by Phoenix's father Chris Warner and his partner Viviene.

After Damo's accident in July 2022, Tess appears to him in a dream by telling him to return to Desi.
