= Mark Mitchinson =

New Zealand actor

- Born: 6 July 1966 (age 60); London, England, UK
- Occupation: Actor
- Years active: 2006–present

Mark Mitchinson (born 6 July 1966) is a British-born New Zealand actor.

== Early life and education ==
Mark Mitchinson was born on 6 July 1966 in London, England.

He trained at the Guildhall School of Speech and Drama in London.

== Career ==
Mitchinson won an award for his portrayal of convicted murderer Colin Bouwer in the 2010 television drama Bloodlines, and an award for Best Performance by an Actor award at the 2012 New Zealand Television Awards for playing Jan Molenaar in Siege.

He was cast in The Hobbit as Braga and in Power Rangers Megaforce as the voice of Creepox. He portrayed the militia leader Crosby Fonda in the 2015 first season of the television series Ash vs Evil Dead, and voices Father Marcus Littleton in the 2023 film Evil Dead Rise.

In November 2025 he was cast in the Australian crime thriller series Treasure & Dirt.

== Filmography ==
=== Film ===
Year	Title	Role	Notes
2008	A Song of Good	Big Eagle	
2008	Show of Hands	Alex Lee Lerner	
2009	Underworld: Rise of the Lycans	Nobleman	
2010	Andy the Waterfall	Andy	
2010	Tracker	Sergeant-Major Saunders	
2011	Rage	Police Commissioner Walton	
2012	Sione's 2: Unfinished Business	Homeless man	
2012	Seed	Nicky Brick	Short
2012	Mr. Pip	Australian lawyer	
2013	The Hobbit: The Desolation of Smaug	Braga	
2014	Consent: The Louise Nicholas Story	John Dewar	
2015	The Hobbit: The Battle of the Five Armies	Braga	
2017	Human Traces	Glenn	
2018	No Shame	Ian	Short
2018	Mortal Engines	Vambrace	
2019	Daffodils	Barry	
2021	Love Knots	Charles Prescott	
2023	Evil Dead Rise	Mr. Fonda / voice of Father Marcus Littleton	
2023	Uproar	Principal Slane	
2026	Lee Cronin's The Mummy	Professor Bixler	

=== Television ===
Year	Title	Role	Notes
2006	Outrageous Fortune	DI Grisham	5 episodes
2007	The Man Who Lost His Head	Murphy	TV movie
2007	The Amazing Extraordinary Friends	Tony Bartiony	3 episodes
2008	Legend of the Seeker	Gosfid	1 episode: "Elixir"
2009	Power Rangers RPM	General Shifter	23 episodes, voice
2010	Eruption	Clive	TV movie
2010	Spartacus: Blood and Sand	Aulus	4 episodes
2010	True Crime: Bloodlines	Colin Bouwer	
2010	Spies and Lies	Burly Local #2	TV movie
2010	Waitangi: What Really Happened	Naval Officer	TV movie
2011	The Almighty Johnsons	Senior Pitt Boss	1 episode: "Bad Things Happen"
2011	Billy	Tom Parkinson	TV movie
2011	Emilie Richards: Der Zauber von Neuseeland	Geoffrey Fletcher	TV movie
2012	True Crime: Siege	Jaan Molenaar	TV movie
2012	Hounds	Trainer 2	6 episodes
2012	Power Rangers Super Samurai	Trickster, Armadeevil	2 episodes, voice
2012-14	Auckland Daze	Mark	2 episodes
2013	Power Rangers Megaforce	Creepox	Voice
2013	Power Rangers Megaforce: Ultimate Team Power	Creepox	Video, voice
2013	Nothing Trivial	Dr. David Manning	6 episodes
2013	War News	Ray Harkness	
2013-16	High Road	Terry Huffer	TV series short; 19 episodes
2014	Coverband	Don	6 episodes
2015	True Crime: How to Murder Your Wife	Mike Bungay	TV movie
2015	True Crime: Venus and Mars	Advocatus Diaboli	TV movie, voice
2015	The Monster of Mangatiti	Bill Cornelius	TV movie documentary
2015	800 Words	Dean	1 episode: 1.05
2015	Ash vs Evil Dead	Crosby	2 episodes
2016	Terry Teo		1 episode: "A Penny for Your Troubles"
2016	Bombshell	Allen Galbraith	TV movie
2016	Power Rangers Dino Super Charge	Singe	Voice
2016	The Brokenwood Mysteries	Declan O'Grady	1 episode: "Over Her Dead Body"
2016-17	Filthy Rich	Lloyd Maxwell	Recurring; 15 episodes
2017	Dear Murderer	Mike Bungay	4 episodes
2017	The Shannara Chronicles	Flick Ohmsford	6 episodes
2017	Wild Ride	Farmer Joe	1 episode: "Chances"
2018	Power Rangers Super Ninja Steel	Sheriff Skyfire	1 episode: "Sheriff Skyfire", voice
2018	Rake	Joe McGregor	8 episodes
2019	Wellington Paranormal	Ghost Cop Miller	1 episode: "Mt Vic Hooters"
2019	Power Rangers Beast Morphers	Turbotron	1 episode: "Gorilla Art", voice
2019	Straight Forward	Ravn	8 episodes
2019	The Gulf	D.I. Ivan Petrie	5 episodes
2020	Mystery Road	Owen	6 episodes
2020	The Luminaries	Thomas Balfour	6 episodes
2021-22	Power Rangers Dino Fury	Boomtower/Boomblaster	10 episodes, coice
2023	Safe Home	Jon	2 episodes
2023	Our Flag Means Death	Captain Hornigold	1 episode: "The Innkeeper"
2024-25	Under the Vines	William McVallum	Major reoccurring role
2024	N00b	Norman Conrad	Recurring role
2026	Crackhead	Graham "Gramp" Collins	Major recurring role

=== Video games ===
Year	Title	Role	Notes
2012	Path of Exile	Tarkleigh	Voice
