= List of The Making of the Mob episodes =

The Making of the Mob is an American television docu-series detailing the emergence of organized crime in 20th century America. The series premiered on June 15, 2015, on AMC and is narrated by actor Ray Liotta.

On July 31, 2015, AMC renewed the series for a second season of eight episodes. During the course of the series, 16 episodes of The Making of the Mob aired over two seasons, concluding on August 29, 2016.

== Series overview ==
Season	Episodes	Originally released	
Season	Episodes	First released	Last released
1	8	June 15, 2015	August 3, 2015
2	8	July 11, 2016	August 29, 2016

== Episodes ==
=== Season 1 (2015) ===
No. overall	No. in season	Title	Original release date	US viewers (millions)
1	1	"The Education of Lucky Luciano"	June 15, 2015	1.18
2	2	"Equal Opportunity Gangster"	June 22, 2015	1.10
3	3	"King of New York"	June 29, 2015	0.982
4	4	"A Rising Threat"	July 6, 2015	0.937
5	5	"Exit Strategy"	July 13, 2015	0.962
6	6	"The Mob at War"	July 20, 2015	1.04
7	7	"New Frontiers"	July 27, 2015	0.901
8	8	"End Game"	August 3, 2015	0.968

=== Season 2 (2016) ===
No. overall	No. in season	Title	Original release date	US viewers (millions)
9	1	"Capone's First Kill"	July 11, 2016	1.18
10	2	"A Death in the Family"	July 18, 2016	0.706
11	3	"Blood Filled Streets"	July 25, 2016	0.743
12	4	"St. Valentine's Day Massacre"	August 1, 2016	0.810
13	5	"Judgment Day"	August 8, 2016	0.631
14	6	"New Blood"	August 15, 2016	0.757
15	7	"Sin City"	August 22, 2016	0.822
16	8	"Last Man Standing"	August 29, 2016	0.939
