= List of The Almighty Johnsons episodes =

The Almighty Johnsons is a New Zealand fantasy comedy-drama television series, which was created by James Griffin and Rachel Lang and is produced by South Pacific Pictures. It began airing its first series of ten episodes in New Zealand on 7 February 2011. The second series of 13 episodes began broadcasting on 29 February 2012. A third series of 13 episodes premiered on 4 July 2013.

The show follows a student named Axl Johnson, who on his 21st birthday discovers his family members are reincarnated Norse gods. The only problem is, they do not have full control of their powers and it is up to Axl (the reincarnation of Odin) to restore them and ensure the family's survival by finding the reincarnation of Odin's wife, Frigg. Matters are complicated by the presence of several antagonistic or amorously interested Norse deities, given that the Johnsons are not the only such demigods living in exile in New Zealand. At the close of the second series, it is revealed that they are not the only pantheon resident there either, as Māori deities have also reincarnated, albeit in similarly restricted circumstances.

== Series overview ==
| Series | Episodes | Originally released | | Rating | Average viewership (in millions) |
| Series | Episodes | First released | Last released | Rating | Average viewership (in millions) |
|---|---|---|---|---|---|
| 1 | 10 | 7 February 2011 | 11 April 2011 | 9.8 | 1.64 |
| 2 | 13 | 29 February 2012 | 23 May 2012 | —N/a | —N/a |
| 3 | 13 | 4 July 2013 | 26 September 2013 | —N/a | —N/a |

== Episodes ==
=== Series 1 (2011) ===
The series premiered in the U.S. on 11 July 2014 and was watched 1.01 million viewers.

| No. overall | No. in series | Title | Directed by | Written by | Original release date |
|---|---|---|---|---|---|
| 1 | 1 | "It's a Kind of a Birthday Present" | Mark Beesley | James Griffin | 7 February 2011 |
On his 21st birthday, Axl Johnson's three brothers take him to a mysterious ceremony in a forest. There he is struck by lightning, then told the brothers are all reincarnated Norse gods: Mikkel is Ullr, god of the hunt and games; Anders is Bragi, god of poetry and eloquence; and Ty is Höðr, god of darkness and cold. Their impossibly youthful grandfather Olaf (Baldr, oracle and god of longevity) proclaims Axl to be Odin, most powerful of the gods. Odin is prophesied to restore their full powers, lost centuries before when he broke up with his beloved wife, Frigg, thus sundering Asgard and dooming the gods to walk diminished amongst mortals. Axl also learns that his mother did not die in a traffic accident as he was told as a child: brokenhearted when his father walked out, she had entered the forest and set her spirit in a tree. Several mortals are introduced: Valerie is Mikkel's wife, taking hormones to conceive a baby, Dawn is Ander's overworked secretary, and Zeb and Gaia are Axl's housemates. The prophesied signs of Odin's return are being watched by a mysterious group of women, who make several attempts to kill Axl. The last attempt only confirms Axl as Odin and he learns his quest is to find and reunite with Frigg. However, if he dies before completing the quest, a natural disaster will kill his close relations, and probably everyone else in the area.
| 2 | 2 | "This Is Where Duty Starts" | Mark Beesley | James Griffin | 14 February 2011 |
Anders Johnson starts researching, for women born of Scandinavian descent, in order to find the reincarnated goddess Frigg, his brother Axl's destined wife. Meanwhile, Mikkel fears that he and his wife Valerie's continued inability to conceive through IVF maybe because she is mortal and he is a god. We learn that at 21, when he inherited his powers, he arrogantly started a barfight which resulted in his best friend Rob, who at the time was Valerie's lover, being left in a coma due to a blow to the head. Hence, he decided to live life without using his god powers, but now Rob, after 15 years, has started babbling in Norse in his sleep. Anders convinces Axl to become romantic with one of his Frigg candidates, a professional athlete and party girl named Karla, even though Axl doesn't want his first time to be with a stranger. Axl loses his virginity, but has a scare when Karla passes out, and Ty must revive her. Worse yet, Jaime, a girl that Axl really likes, sees him out on a date with Karla and later rejects him.
| 3 | 3 | "God's Gift to Zebras" | Murray Keane | James Griffin | 21 February 2011 |
Women are starting to notice Axl: they sense that something is different about him. The women who tried to kill Axl are revealed as reincarnated Norse goddesses, also searching for Frigg. Having failed to kill Axl and forestall the prophecy, the natural disaster that killing him now would provoke would probably kill them, too. Now, they are instead determined to find Frigg first and prevent her and Axl meeting. Their leader Agnetha tasks their oracle Ingrid with finding Frigg, while bike courier Stacey is to follow Axl. Meanwhile, Axl chats up a librarian he meets while borrowing books about Norse gods. He lets slip that he is Odin and she says she is Frigg; she then invites him to a costume party for gods at her house. Axl's brothers are sceptical that the quest could so easily be fulfilled, as are the goddesses when Stacey relays the overheard conversation. The goddess Sjöfn (Michele) is sent to the party. Axl arrives out of costume but with his sword, and finds a second girl calling herself Frigg: he realizes they are players of an online RPG. He recognizes Michele as the woman who shot him with an arrow, and they have a sword fight that amazes the guests. During the fight, she reveals the goddesses' plans: they want to prevent the Johnsons' powers being restored, as the gods would then rule them. In another plotline, Ty is infatuated with Helen, a nightclub owner whose refrigerator he is called out to repair. He is strongly drawn to her and feels warmth around her, and thinks it could be love. When they make love it begins to snow in Helen's apartment. Ty is horrified to have revealed his powers, but Helen immediately accepts his godhood, revealing she is the goddess Iðunn. Later, Olaf tells him that Iðunn's destiny, in all of her incarnations, is to be with Bragi (Anders), whom she will love at first sight, and that it never ends well for her. Ty reluctantly breaks with her, because they can have no future, and to prevent her meeting Anders. Ty then notices Dawn, Anders' long-suffering secretary.
| 4 | 4 | "You Gotta Love Life, Baby" | Murray Keane | Rachel Lang | 28 February 2011 |
A former flame of Olaf's shows up pregnant, but he has no intention of raising a child. Axl tries to manipulate the situation so that the baby might be adopted by Mike and Val, but his efforts come to nothing. Meanwhile, Anders' manipulation of a scandal involving two celebrity clients disgusts Dawn and Ty. Ty tries to break Anders' hold over Dawn, but Anders won't allow it.
| 5 | 5 | "This Is Not Washing Powder, My Friend" | Mark Beesley | Maxine Fleming & James Griffin | 7 March 2011 |
Michele plants cocaine in Axl's car and anonymously tips off the police. By the time they arrive, Zeb has already removed the drug, although the officers remain suspicious of Axl. Meanwhile, the flatmates are visited by Gaia's gay dad, Bryn, from Waiheke Island, who wants Gaia to honour her promise to return home. Anders assumes control of the first problem: he and Ty learn Michele's identity, then Anders threatens to ruin her career if she doesn't back off. Axl convinces Gaia that he really loves having her around and she tells her dad she wants to stay. Bryn leaves, but not before affirming his dislike of Axl.
| 6 | 6 | "Goddesses, Axl, Come in All Forms" | Mark Beesley | James Griffin | 14 March 2011 |
The paths of the gods and goddesses cross at a rural funeral and both groups encounter Derrick, the current incarnation of Thor. Derrick believes his daughter, Delphine, is Frigg, although she isn't a goddess, and wants Axl to marry her. Meanwhile, relationships evolve: Olaf and Ingrid bond, Anders and Michele indulge in a little verbal sparring, and Ty and Dawn explore their feelings for each other. Axl dodges the bullet and faces Derrick down, getting him to accept his authority as Odin and to show more respect for Delphine.
| 7 | 7 | "Bad Things Happen" | Murray Keane | Tim Balme & James Griffin | 21 March 2011 |
Mike's financial problems come to a head; he fights with Val and storms out. He decides to use his powers, with mixed results: he wins a lot of money, is barred from a casino and makes a new friend in the now ex-croupier. While he is out, news comes that Rob has regained consciousness. Meanwhile, Gaia goes out with her new boyfriend, so Axl and Zeb decide to get drunk - although alcohol has no effect on Axl. Axl breaks into Anders' house, which is well stocked. They are joined by three girls who claim to be Anders' friends, but are actually conquests seeking revenge. They drug the men (including Anders, on his return) with horse tranquilliser - this, too, has no effect on Axl, so they handcuff him to a chair. Once the girls leave the room, Axl breaks free, then threatens them with a knife so that they leave. When Anders recovers, Axl, as Odin, orders him not to have sex with mortals until he permits it. Earlier, Zeb had recovered enough to see Axl break the handcuffs, so finding out about Axl's power.
| 8 | 8 | "I Can Give You Frigg" | Murray Keane | Rachel Lang | 28 March 2011 |
The goddesses have, apparently, found the lost goddess Frigg: a goth singer and butcher named Eva. Michele, Ingrid and Stacey collude to not inform Agnetha, but she finds out anyway. Michele makes a blood oath with Anders and tells him. Meanwhile, Mike and Val's marriage is again rocky. Rob admits to initially being angry at Mike for marrying his fiance, while Anders tries to convince Mike that Val is still in love with Rob. Anders brings Axl to see Eva. Sparks fly, literally, from the sound system, and Axl, too, is convinced she is Frigg.
| 9 | 9 | "Hunting Reindeer on Slippery Rocks" | Mark Beesley | James Griffin | 4 April 2011 |
Axl and Eva begin their relationship hesitantly, but abruptly decide on an engagement. Colin Gundersen, Eva's estranged father and also Loki (god of fire), is supportive, although he occasionally lets slip his contempt for the Johnsons. He arranges a ceremony during which Mike, Axl and Eva sign a contract, written in Norse runes, to unite the god clans. Axl smuggles Zeb in to see the ceremony, but his presence does not go unnoticed. Meanwhile, Dawn suffers hypothermia after falling asleep while in physical contact with Ty. Ty is devastated, realising he cannot stay with her. Gaia celebrates her birthday, at which Zeb is badly burned in a barbecue accident.
| 10 | 10 | "Every Good Quest Has a Sacrifice" "Like Jesus, Only Cooler" | Mark Beesley | James Griffin | 11 April 2011 |
Axl realises he is in love with his flatmate, Gaia, and decides to cancel the wedding. However, Colin reveals that breaking the contract, which was signed in blood, will result in Mike's death - even though Eva is actually not Frigg but Hel, goddess of the underworld. With Axl unable to explain, Gaia believes that he has used her and leaves for Waiheke Island. Ty, who has only just broken up with Dawn, marries Eva, fulfilling the terms of the contract and allowing Axl to continue his quest. Meanwhile, Val is pregnant to Rob, so her and Mike's marriage is over. In the final scene, Anders makes overtures to Agnetha, who reveals that she is the Johnson brothers' long-lost mother.

=== Series 2 (2012) ===
| No. overall | No. in series | Title | Directed by | Written by | Original release date |
|---|---|---|---|---|---|
| 11 | 1 | "And Then She Will Come to You" | Simon Bennett | James Griffin | 29 February 2012 |
Several months have passed. Mike is living with Axl and Zeb (who now identifies as the wolf Freki). Mike is using his powers to have frequent one-night stands as he tries to deal with the end of his marriage. Ty and Eva's relationship is darkly passionate and possibly self-destructive. Dawn is back working for Anders, and is stalking Ty. Agnetha sends Anders off to Norway on a mysterious errand. She informs Axl, Mike and Ty that she is their mother; Axl and Mike are not thrilled. Axl is frustrated that his brothers are ignoring the quest for Frigg. An old acquaintance of Olaf's, the reincarnation of Kvasir, tells Axl that he must become a man before he can be a god, and that Frigg will then come to him. Anders is seen in a hotel room, looking bemusedly at a drawing of Yggdrasil.
| 12 | 2 | "Frigg Magnet" | Simon Bennett | James Griffin | 7 March 2012 |
Agnetha and Eva trade barbs. Eva delays Ty from a meeting with Agnetha and Axl. Agnetha encourages Axl to give up his quest. Colin takes Axl out drinking, promising to help him in the quest: the next day, Axl faces an accusation of rape, engineered by Colin. Mike settles the problem by winning a wager with Colin, in the process taking ownership of a bar, although Colin seems unperturbed by the loss. Mike realizes he can move out of Axl's house. Agnetha sends Dawn home to try out some wine, then gets Ty to check on her, saying she is depressed because of him. Later, Ty and Eva brand each other with an iron designed by Eva. Jacob tries to break into Axl's house, looking for Gaia, and Axl forcibly ejects him. Axl and Zeb then discover Gaia hiding in a closet: she asks to move back in.
| 13 | 3 | "Charlie Truman" | Murray Keane | James Griffin | 14 March 2012 |
Gaia has changed character and is wild and outgoing. Bryn and Jacob arrive to take her back to the Island. Axl and Bryn fight, and Gaia runs out. Later, she tells Axl of their overprotective custody. Axl promises to take care of it. Meanwhile, at Mike's bar-christening party, Axl catches Ty and Eva freezing a masochist in the pub toilets. The brothers call a thing to get Ty to pull out of his and Eva's deathly games. Eva tells Ty she wants to have children. Ty seeks Agnetha's advice: she tells him to leave Eva and join Anders on his quest, but Ty cannot bring himself to do so. Dawn visits Ty's home to check on him and Eva locks her in the freezer. Ty rescues her and takes her home. He returns to find Eva locked in the freezer, at the point of death.
| 14 | 4 | "Death's Cleansing Embrace" | Murray Keane | Ross Hastings and James Griffin | 21 March 2012 |
Agnetha admits to Ty that she killed Eva, saying that someone had to. She persuades Ty, reluctant and still in shock, to help make the death look accidental or like a suicide. Colin believes Ty responsible and threatens him. He steals Eva's body from the coffin and stores it in Ty's freezer, planning a hilltop Norse funeral. Ty tells Mike (and later Olaf) that he was present when Eva died; Mike puts two and two together and confronts Agnetha. At the Norse ceremony, Colin ignites the pyre with a flamethrower. Ty contemplates throwing himself on the pyre, as Colin had demanded, but doesn't. Colin remains intent on vengeance.
| 15 | 5 | "A Damn Fine Woman" | Charlie Haskell | James Griffin | 28 March 2012 |
After a party, Axl falls asleep wearing a dress and wakes up as a woman: Zeb names her "Mia". Olaf explains it is one of Odin's powers, used for spying, and suggests there is a reason for its happening. Axl learns Dawn is looking for evidence that Ty killed Eva, then tells Colin not to blame Ty for Eva's death. Ty tries to convince Dawn he didn't kill Eva. Agnetha sends Dawn on a holiday to distract her, but she only becomes more suspicious after seeing Ty and Agnetha together. Axl reasons he has changed in order to find out how to become a better man. In an effort to change back, he goes to sleep wearing his own clothes, but it doesn't work. Believing her to be a girlfriend and still waiting for Axl, Gaia tells "Mia" that Axl hurts all the women he is involved with. Mike asks Michele to show Axl what women like: afterwards, he reverts to normal.
| 16 | 6 | "Folkmoot" | Charlie Haskell | Tim Balme | 4 April 2012 |
Colin attempts to kill Ty, setting a fire while he is sleeping, but a fire alarm and Ty's power of cold save him. Failing to dissuade Colin, Agnetha calls upon Axl to convene a folkmoot, at which Odin will rule on the dispute. To protect the still suspicious Dawn from Agnetha, Ty tells Colin the truth. At the folkmoot, Colin accuses Agnetha of Eva's murder. Axl, as Odin, rules that Agnetha shapeshift back into a tree for the duration of a mortal's life. Colin, unsatisfied, tries to kill her, but is stopped by Axl. Agnetha departs into the forest. A fire, started by Colin, later consumes trees in the area, presumably including Agnetha. Meanwhile, Michele leaves Colin and allies herself with Mike, who stipulates a test of her powers: that she help Zeb lose his virginity. She manipulates Stacey to becomes heavily infatuated with Zeb, much to the horror of Gaia and Axl.
| 17 | 7 | "Effortless Manly Coolness" | Geoffrey Cawthorn | Fiona Samuel | 11 April 2012 |
Ingrid picks up Danny - a former lover and nurse at the mental health facility where she was a patient - who has been in prison for selling stolen drugs. Axl and Ty disapprove of Danny, but Ingrid is devoted to him. Ty quizzes Michele, seeking a way to lose his godhood so he can be with Dawn without killing her. Mike learns he is executor of Agnetha's will, and must divide her estate between the goddesses. Ingrid wants to use her share to start a magic mushroom farm with Danny. Axl arranges an intervention to convince Ingrid she is appreciated and needed. It at first seems to backfire, until Ty asks her to help him in his quest to become mortal. Anders returns from his mission.
| 18 | 8 | "Man-Flu" | Geoffrey Cawthorn | Ross Hastings and James Griffin | 18 April 2012 |
A cutting from Yggdrasil, the tree of life, that Anders brought back has been impounded by New Zealand Customs. Michele, Axl, Olaf and Ty come down with a mystery illness. While Michele merely shows flu-like symptoms, Axl becomes very ill, goes into convulsions and is hospitalised. Olaf ages rapidly. Ty, on the other hand, welcomes the loss of his powers and romances Dawn. Mike becomes anxious that Axl might die, given that a previous incarnation's death caused a major earthquake. Anders and Stacey steal the Yggdrasil branch from Customs, hoping to use it to heal Axl and Olaf. After Michele touches it, her touching Axl leaves a brief afterglow. Later, Axl wakes up when Gaia touches him. Stacey and Olaf bond and, after he recovers, have sex. Meanwhile, Mike, without his ability, has squandered much of Agnetha's estate in stock speculation, although enough is left for Stacey to buy out the courier business she works for.
| 19 | 9 | "Everything Starts with Gaia" | Charlie Haskell | Tiffany Zehnal and James Griffin | 25 April 2012 |
Gaia is having strange dreams and behaving erratically. Bryn and Jacob arrive, insisting she leave with them immediately. Eggthér, a jötunn, also arrives, intent on killing her. After knocking him out, Axl takes Gaia and the others to Mike's bar. Olaf's sense of smell reveals Bryn to be a (short) giant and Jacob a (tall) dwarf. When Olaf, Mike and Axl identify themselves as gods, they run off, shocked. Later, they admit they had been sent to kill Gaia as an infant, to avert disaster for giants and dwarfs alike should she become Frigg, but instead had chosen to protect her. Eggthér takes Zeb hostage, threatening to kill him unless Axl hands over Frigg. The gods prepare for battle and call on Derrick (Thor), who hates giants, for help. Meanwhile, Anders drags Ty out drinking, and in the process meets his soul mate, Helen (Iðunn). Axl and Bryn tell Gaia that she is to become Frigg, but she just laughs.
| 20 | 10 | "Magical Fluffy Bunny World" | Charlie Haskell | James Griffin | 2 May 2012 |
Axl and Bryn cannot convince Gaia she will become a goddess. She confronts Mike, who has the goddesses explain things more gently. With Eggther still threatening to kill Zeb, Gaia insists on joining Mike, Olaf, Axl, Derrick and Bryn in facing him. Events almost get out of hand, but it turns out Zeb has been using amateur psychology on the giant to pacify him. Meanwhile, Anders and Helen get acquainted. Michele steals the Yggdrasil cutting and taps its power to heal Mike's injured back. Repeated mention is made of the importance of apples. Gaia is kidnapped by hooded men in a van.
| 21 | 11 | "The House of Jerome" | Murray Keane | Ross Hastings, Tim Balme & James Griffin | 9 May 2012 |
The Johnsons are not the only gods resident in New Zealand: Gaia's abductors are Maori deities, who claim her as one of their own. They believe Gaia to be the reincarnation of Papatuanuku, the Māori goddess of the earth and fertility, citing a rival prophecy that the goddess will be the child of a mixed-pantheon union and will wed the Māori god Māui. They reveal that Bryn killed Gaia's parents. The two groups hold a meeting to discuss their rival claims. Meanwhile, Olaf discovers Kvasir living in hiding at the bar. Anders and Helen deal with Natalie, a conservative, germaphobic potential client from Norway, who seems to have ulterior motives for being there. Natalie gives Helen rings for her and Anders; Helen wears hers, but Anders declines. Michele shows Stacey and Ingrid the Yggdrasil cutting, and they find it responsive to their feminine energies. Gaia and Axl agree to escape the others' expectations of them, and drive off.
| 22 | 12 | "You Call This the Real World?" | Murray Keane | James Griffin | 16 May 2012 |
Axl and Gaia find "Brigadoon", a sanctuary away from the debate over competing prophecies. They work through their feelings and gradually acknowledge that they care for one another. Meanwhile, members of the Māori pantheon camp out in the bar, awaiting Gaia's return. Helen increasingly influences Anders' decisions, persuading him to let Dawn go. Olaf reveals that, through Kvasir, he has discovered that Colin has bugged the bar. Olaf has Kvasir tell Ty how he can relinquish his god abilities so as to pursue a relationship with Dawn: Ty must drink tea made from Yggdrasil bark, and must die and come back to life. Mike tracks Axl and Gaia down and brings them home, whereupon Gaia dismisses the Māori squatters until it is certain which deity she will become. Ty drinks the tea; he dies and his god spirit leaves his body, then Michele taps power from the Yggdrasil cutting to bring him back to life.
| 23 | 13 | "Does This Look Like Asgard?" | Murray Keane | James Griffin | 23 May 2012 |
It is Gaia's 21st birthday and her goddess identity is about to be revealed. As the two pantheons await the outcome, the goddesses prepare Gaia for the incarnation ceremony. Mike, incensed by Colin's intrusion, becomes determined to kill him. Ty is horrified to learn that losing his godhood has caused every mortal he has met to forget him - including Dawn, with whom he tries to restart a relationship. Anders convinces Dawn to come back to work. Anders, increasingly concerned about the intensity of his relationship with Helen, attempts to cool their relationship. They are interrupted by fundamentalist Christian 'god-hunter' Natalie, who threatens them with a crossbow and shoots and kills Helen. Stalked by Natalie, Anders flees to the site of the ceremony where Gaia's goddess identity is to be revealed. Natalie, about to kill Mike, is incinerated by Colin. Due to Helen's death, Iðunn's soul is reincarnated within Gaia, disappointing both Axl and the Māoris.

=== Series 3 (2013) ===
| No. overall | No. in series | Title | Directed by | Written by | Original release date |
|---|---|---|---|---|---|
| 24 | 1 | "An Orchard of Trees" | Murray Keane | James Griffin | 4 July 2013 |
Despite now being Iðunn, Gaia is still in love with Axl. Anders and Gaia both deny their destined attraction, and Axl is oblivious. Axl proposes to Gaia and she accepts: this alarms the other gods. Olaf and Ingrid separate Axl and Gaia and convince them that Gaia will always be drawn to Bragi (Anders), regardless of her actual feelings. Gaia later has sex with Anders. Meanwhile, Dawn visits Ty, ostensibly to learn a cupcake recipe. Things go well until she has a flashback of being trapped in his freezer, and hurriedly leaves.
| 25 | 2 | "This Thing Inside" | Murray Keane | James Griffin | 11 July 2013 |
Gaia asks Axl to bring the wedding forward, but then has sex with Anders again. Distraught, she confesses to Axl, who goes to kill Anders - who is in hiding. Mike refuses to help Axl, but finds Anders on his own. Trying to make peace, Mike brings the family together at the partially renovated bar. In a rage, Axl throws Anders into a pile of rubble, mortally wounding him. Axl flees, while Michele saves Anders' life, revealing her to those present that she has the Yggdrasil cutting. Mike finds Axl to tell him that Anders is fine, and convinces him to forgive Gaia. Gaia, knowing she can't avoid betraying him, tells Axl she will be leaving for London on her own - after they have spent one last night together.
| 26 | 3 | "Bergerbar" | Geoffrey Cawthorn | Tim Balme | 18 July 2013 |
Axl, depressed after Gaia's departure, is drinking heavily. Ty makes a fresh start, quitting the fridge repair business and selling his house. The latter angers Colin, who burns it down, revealing it is uninsured and Ty will be wiped out financially. Ty stays optimistic and takes a job at Stacey's courier company. Axl tells Mike he has failed his course due to non-attendance. Mike tries to help, but Anders has already used his powers to wangle a pass for Axl. Mike calls a Bergerbar, a traditional meeting of brothers, to resolve their difficulties. They relax over a drinking session, but afterwards a very drunk Axl stands on the edge of a building, contemplating suicide and regaling a group of onlookers with his troubles as Odin. Ty talks him down, while Anders, discovering his power now works on groups, gets the crowd to disperse and forget what they have heard. Ty discovers he has a rival for Dawn's affections. Mike gives Axl a job helping renovate the bar. Working alone, Axl puts a nail gun to his head, but decides against killing himself.
| 27 | 4 | "Like the Berserkers of Old" | Geoffrey Cawthorn | Natalie Medlock and James Griffin | 25 July 2013 |
Axl causes major damage to the bar, and Mike and Michele move in with Michele's mother, Karen. Anders receives a lucrative offer for the use of his recently expanded powers to help Colin run for Mayor of Auckland. Olaf and Stacey locate the god-hunters: not in Norway, but Auckland, hiding within a church congregation. The gods discuss what to do. Axl tries to assert his authority as Odin - by agreeing with Mike about not involving Colin - only to be left out of the action himself. The others collect Anders and confront the group. Nathalie's widower recognises the gods. Michele breaks his arm and then heals it. He explains that the pagan gods in Norway were thought to have fled to America, until Anders had given away his identity and the family's location. Anders uses his power to make the group forget about god-hunting. Meanwhile, Axl bunks off with Tanzie, a young woman who comes to the bar. He ends up saving her from drowning when the sea seems to attack them. Ingrid realises that they missed one god-hunter, who had gone out that day to kill a god. She tells Mike, who confirms that all the gods are accounted for except Axl. He rushes to the flat, to find Axl being gently dumped by Tanzie. Axl reminds him that the god-hunters don't know Ty isn't a god, and Mike calls Ty just as the last god-hunter tries to run him over. Ty fights him off, and Lance arrives late to jump on him. Anders accepts Colin's offer, on condition that he leave the Johnsons alone. Later, Mike and Michele discover that Karen's one-night stand is the Johnsons' long absent father Johan.
| 28 | 5 | "Unleash the Kraken!" | Mike Smith | Nick Ward and James Griffin | 1 August 2013 |
Learning that Johan is not only the Johnsons' father but the vessel of Njörðr, a sea god, Karen throws a fancy dress / family reunion party. Her godly power as 'social organiser' means none of them can reject the invitation. Olaf warns Mike about speaking to Johan, whose power is that his voice calms emotions - but only temporarily, and they return worse than before after he leaves. With Ty having moved out of Axl's flat and Ingrid unable to pay rent, Zeb suggests Amelia, a former mutual schoolfriend and crush of Zeb's. Axl reluctantly agrees. She flirts with Zeb but reminds Axl of a brief sexual fling - when she was uncaring of Zeb's feelings. At the party, old wounds are reopened: Ty's attempt to rebuke Johan is deflected by his power, Olaf punches Johan for breaking his one rule (never hit a woman), and Mike and Johan argue over Mike being left in charge of the family. The brothers play backyard cricket. The game dissolves in a brawl, until Olaf breaks it up and explains that it is due to Johan, who has gone and isn't coming back. Meanwhile, Johan tells Axl he has been drawn home because of Odin, and encourages him to face up to Amelia. They leave together. At the flat, Axl tells Zeb that Amelia is a psycho and only ever used Zeb as a way to reach him. Zeb refuses to believe it and tells Axl to leave, but Amelia proves Axl right by stabbing him in the back. His Odin powers growing, Axl hardly notices. Johan takes Axl to hospital before admitting he is leaving and suggesting a road trip to Norsewood, the Johnson family homestead. As they drive off, a mysterious man watches and writes "Odin – to Norsewood" in a notebook.
| 29 | 6 | "And Then on to Norsewood" | Mike Smith | Ross Hastings | 8 August 2013 |
Axl and Johan travel aimlessly without reaching Norsewood. With Axl away and Amelia gone, Zeb's only housemate is Ingrid, who isn't paying. Anders begins work as Colin's campaign manager. Dawn is put in charge of hiring. Karen reveals to Mike that her father was the previous Ullr. Axl and Johan bond, with Johan continuing to avoid reaching Norsewood. Eventually, he sells the car to bribe their way onto a Korean fishing boat, but Axl baulks. Johan departs, and Axl is picked up by Martin, the man following them in the prior episode. Meanwhile, Michele is approached by one of the god-killers to heal his sister's arthritis. Colin tells Anders he has the money bequeathed by Agnetha, and will use it to pay Anders for a good campaign. Anders starts billing everything to the campaign fund and Dawn becomes head of policy. Olaf convinces Mike to go to a private club to raise money to pay for the bar, but they are almost killed as Mike gets caught up in the thrill of being Ullr. Martin abandons Axl at a bar, saying he "needs to be here, for now." Derrick is there, missing his hammer.
| 30 | 7 | "Typical Auckland God" | Michael Hurst | James Griffin | 15 August 2013 |
After a night's drinking, Axl wakes up in bed with the barmaid, Suzie. Derrick having been sent home with his neighbour, Thom, Axl sets out to return his ute. Derrick, who blames his neighbours, Thom and Kerry, for stealing his hammer, is enraged that Axl let his enemies drive him home. He begs Axl's help to retrieve the hammer, so Axl talks to Thom and Kerry. They reveal Derrick tried to kill them with it after a disagreement about music (and because they are gay). He also illegally fenced off their land. Meanwhile, Axl notices that Suzie can pour beer from empty bottles and realizes she is a goddess, although unaware of it. He starts to think she is Frigg, since they get on so well together, but a call to Olaf reveals otherwise: she is Sága, Odin's best friend. To get Derrick his hammer back, Axl must convince him to attend Thom and Kerry's engagement party wearing the wedding dress he keeps in his closet. (See the Þrymskviða myth.) Derrick assents and gets his hammer back, but Axl has to play his bridesmaid and wear a dress to the party as well. Axl leaves for Norsewood, where he finds a note addressed to Odin. Mike shows up, having got a text from Axl saying he was stranded in Norsewood and ready to come home - a mystery, since Axl had thrown his phone away. Meanwhile, Ty finds his godly powers may be returning. Dawn has another flashback, this time of her and Ty picnicking happily.
| 31 | 8 | "The Asparagus Is Kicking In" | Michael Hurst | Tim Balme | 22 August 2013 |
Axl and Mike return from Norsewood. Michele has finished the renovations and she and Mike move back in above the bar. Axl reveals the message from Norsewood: "Jormungand is stirring," which Olaf says means Ragnarok is coming. Olaf and Axl meet Tigilau, the sea god who attacked Axl. Lance breaks up with Dawn over a dress. Colin asks Anders to persuade Dawn to sleep with him, threatening him when he refuses. During the campaign launch, Dawn leads Colin to a back alley, where Anders and Ty appear. Dawn walks away, but looks back as Ty (who is a god again) freezes Colin's arm. More of Dawn's memories of Ty return. Colin confronts Mike and threatens the Johnsons, but makes the mistake of betting he will win: Mike immediately accepts and it becomes a game, which Mike will win. Meanwhile, Axl restarts his search for Frigg.
| 32 | 9 | "Mike in the Mirror" | Geoffrey Cawthorn | Michael Bennett and James Griffin | 29 August 2013 |
Zeb awakens from a dream with a brilliant idea: a casting call for actresses to play Frigg in a beer commercial. Axl likes it, as Frigg would come to him. The auditions go poorly: Axl rejects all the candidates and gets a black eye from the boyfriend of one of them. Although blinded in one eye, Axl is granted extraordinary insight. He has a conversation with Mike in his bathroom mirror. Mike says that he, Ullr, is Odin and that he will find Frigg before Axl does. Zeb remembers the story of Mímir's well, in which Odin sacrifices his eye to gain wisdom. Meanwhile, Michele, with Ingrid as assistant, begins holding "Goddess Healing" sessions for women, to earn cash. Anders wangles his way in by threatening to tell Mike, then outlines a more profitable and discreet business plan. Dawn confronts Ty about her memories. At first reluctant, he follows the advice in an anonymous note (from Martin, who has also visited Dawn) and admits they were lovers. He explains he is a god. At a family meeting, Mike is livid that Axl, Ty and the goddesses are risking revealing the secret of the gods' presence among mortals in Auckland. Axl tells Mike he is not Odin and never will be.
| 33 | 10 | "Playing God" | Geoffrey Cawthorn | Natalie Medlock and James Griffin | 5 September 2013 |
Michele continues her healing sessions, now with Anders. Mike becomes suspicious of her activities, finally getting the truth from Anders. Mike and Michele argue and break up. Ty and Dawn have resumed their relationship and moved in together. Olaf warns Ty against getting too close to a mortal, then visits Dawn and gets her stoned. While high, and provoked by Olaf's unconsidered comments, she worries about being hurt, even killed, with Ty in her life. Ty arrives and talks her down from a rope climbing tower. Meanwhile, Axl happens on the goddesses playing with the Yggdrasil cutting and learns of the powers it gives them - such as wisdom to Ingrid. He hits on the idea of Ingrid tapping its power to find Frigg. At first reluctant, she guides Axl to an aged care home: there, they find a mute man whom Ingrid introduces as Frederick Larsen, the god Hœnir, and Frigg's father. As Axl returns with Michele, hoping to cure him and find Frigg, Mike throws the Yggdrasil cutting into a woodchipper. Axl becomes enraged.
| 34 | 11 | "A Bit Like Buses Really" | Murray Keane | Ross Hastings and James Griffin | 12 September 2013 |
Time is running out for Axl. Mike has enough clues to find Frigg himself, and intends to become Odin. Axl tries to unite the others behind him. Michele is determined to sabotage the meeting of Odin and Frigg, believing that when the gods get their powers, she will be relegated to minor goddess status. Dawn is also reluctant to see the quest end. Mike goes looking for Frigg at Martin's house. Martin, Olaf reveals, is the god Heimdall, who sees and hears all and can teleport himself and others as they pass through doorways. Despite Olaf's warning, Mike tries to trick him into leading him to Frigg. Axl and Anders find Martin's room in a home for the mentally disturbed. Though Martin is not there, there are Norse runes on the wall and Scrabble tiles ("VILIVE") on a dresser. Later, Stacey realizes that the letters spell the name of a bridalwear shop, one of her clients. Axl and Mike arrive at the shop at almost the same time, and meet Hanna, who is undoubtedly Frigg. She now has to choose between the two Odins.
| 35 | 12 | "Late to the Point of Knowledge" | Murray Keane | James Griffin | 19 September 2013 |
Axl and Mike both try to get close to Hanna, despite agreeing to let her make her choice. Mike succeeds first, using the pretext of introducing Martin to Ingrid, who has personal experience with being driven insane by godly knowledge. Mike and Hanna have lunch; they get along very well and have sex. Tipped off by Stacey, Michele discovers them in bed, asleep. Later, Axl finds Hanna: she requests an afternoon of meaningless fun, but is not drawn to him in the way he hopes. Ingrid learns Martin has orchestrated certain events, such as Gaia sleeping with Anders so she wouldn't end up with Axl, and ensuring the woodchipper destroyed the Yggdrasil cutting. He reveals that the union of Odin and Frigg will happen at the Ga — a ceremony neither of the oracles knows about – and the outcome will not be what anyone expects. Ingrid and Olaf call a thing to discuss it. Meanwhile, Michele, resuming her plan to prevent the union, threatens Hanna with a knife. Sensing the danger, Martin picks up a hammer, steps through a doorway to return home, and kills Michele with a blow to the back of the head.
| 36 | 13 | "The End of the World as We Know It" | Mike Smith | James Griffin | 26 September 2013 |
Hanna has revivified Michele's body. The gods learn that, once Odin and Frigg are united at the Ga, their godly selves will ascend to Asgard, leaving their mortal vessels powerless and forgotten. Michele will die, as only Frigg's energy within Hanna now keeps her alive. Major disasters rock the world as Jormungandr stirs, foreshadowing Ragnarok. Michele takes Ingrid and Stacey on a shopping spree with her credit card. Mike and Hanna sleep together; she leaves before he wakes. Axl pursues Hanna, urging her to make her choice so Ragnarok can be averted. Having decided, she first tells Mike, then greets Axl as Odin. The Ga is set for the next morning. Michele, Anders and Mike gamble big at the casino; Axl and Zeb play videogames; Olaf, Stacey and Ingrid carouse on the beach; Ty and Dawn make their own preparations. The next morning they all meet for the Ga. Axl promises Michele that Odin's first act will be to restore her to life. Hanna and Axl perform the ritual. The gods' essences depart, leaving Michele dead and Martin vanished. Odin keeps his promise and Michele comes back to life. Realizing that he and Hanna don't have to stay together now Odin and Frigg are in Asgard, Axl gently directs her towards Mike. Ty delivers a package to Dawn, containing a video she made to remind herself of their love. Axl reintroduces himself to Zeb and takes over his own room.

== Webisodes ==
=== Gods Among Us (2013) ===
| No. | Title | Original release date |
|---|---|---|
| 1 | "Episode 1" | 28 August 2013 |
| 2 | "Episode 2" | 5 September 2013 |
| 3 | "Episode 3" | 12 September 2013 |
| 4 | "Episode 4" | 19 September 2013 |
| 5 | "Episode 5" | 25 September 2013 |
| 6 | "Episode 6" | 2 October 2013 |
| 7 | "Episode 7" | 10 October 2013 |
| 8 | "Episode 8" | 16 October 2013 |
| 9 | "Episode 9" | 24 October 2013 |
| 10 | "Episode 10" | 31 October 2013 |

== Home media ==
=== Box sets ===
| Title | Set details | Blu-ray (Note: Only released on Blu-ray in region A.) and DVD release dates | | | | Special features |
| Title | Set details | Region A / 1 | Region 2 | Region 4 | | Special features |
| Title | Set details | Region A / 1 | Region 2 | New Zealand | Australia | Special features |
|---|---|---|---|---|---|---|
| The Almighty Johnsons — Series 1 | Discs: 3; Episodes: 10 | 7 October 2014 | 9 April 2012 | 18 May 2011 | 6 June 2012 | Interviews with James Griffin – co-creator and Simon Bennett – producer; Audio commentary with cast & crew (Note: Not included on the Australian (region 4) release.); Gods gallery |
| The Almighty Johnsons — Series 2 | Discs: 3 (Note: Region 2 has 4 discs.); Episodes: 13 | —N/a | 17 December 2012 | 30 May 2012 | —N/a | Interview with co-creator (James Griffin); Interview with producer (Simon Bennett) |
| The Almighty Johnsons — Series 3 | Discs: 3; Episodes: 13 | —N/a | —N/a | 2 October 2013 | —N/a | Deleted scenes |

=== Compilations ===
| Title | Set details | Blu-ray and DVD release dates | Special features |
| Title | Set details | Region A / 1 | Special features |
|---|---|---|---|
| The Almighty Johnsons — The Complete Series: Unedited Version | Discs: 9; Episodes: 36 | 28 April 2015 | Season 1, episode 1 commentary with Tim Balme (Mike), Emmett Skilton (Axl), and director Mark Beesley; Bonus cast interview |

== Notes ==
- ^{a} ^{b} ^{d} ^{e} Number includes additional viewers from a 9:00 p.m. rebroadcast airing the same night on TV3 Plus 1.
- ^{c} Number includes additional viewers from a 10:40 p.m. rebroadcast airing the following Sunday night.
