= Holly Shervey =

New Zealand actor (born 1989)

- Born: Holly Melissa Shervey; 18 December 1989 (age 36); Cooma, Australia
- Occupation: Actor
- Years active: 2012–present
- Height: 5 ft 8 in (173 cm)
- Partner: Emmett Skilton (2014–present)
- Children: 1
- Website: www.hollyshervey.com

Holly Melissa Shervey (born 18 December 1989), is a television and film actress and writer. She is an Australian-born New Zealander.

Shervey has acted in numerous prime-time local and international screen productions including Amazon Prime's American Playboy: The Hugh Hefner Story and TVNZ's Shortland Street, and has most recently appeared in the feature film, The Tank. She also served as the showrunner, writer and lead protagonist of Three's Crackhead.

Shervey has also written and starred in over 70 episodes of her own series, Auckward Love and Millennial Jenny.

== Early life ==
Shervey was born in the New South Wales town of Cooma, Australia. She grew up in Queenstown, New Zealand, and attended Wakatipu High School. Shervey acted in film and theatre productions in Queenstown before moving to Auckland to attend the performing arts school, The Actors Program, in 2012.

== Career ==
=== Film and television ===
After graduating from The Actors Program, Shervey was cast in the New Zealand series Nothing Trivial in 2013. In 2015, she created and starred in Auckward Love, and in 2016 acted in American Playboy: The Hugh Hefner Story, playing a real-life former bunny, Teddy Howard.

Shervey has played Zoe Carlson on the long-running New Zealand TV series Shortland Street since 2018. Her character dealt with several hard-hitting storylines, including themes around sexual assault. Shervey has also featured in New Zealand shows Kiwi, Head High, and Mean Mums, as well as the international feature film, The Tank, set for cinematic release in 2023.

Shervey also created and wrote the television series Crackhead, which was based on her personal experiences at a psychiatric ward in 2010. Shervey also played the protagonist Frankie Jones, a troubled young woman who is sent to a drug and alcohol rehabilitation centre in lieu of a prison sentence. The series was distributed in mid March 2026 by Three in New Zealand and HBO Max in Australia.

=== Writing ===
In 2015, Shervey began her writing career by creating the award-winning series Auckward Love. The series won numerous awards in international film festivals and continued for three seasons on New Zealand’s TVNZ Plus. Shervey then went on to write and star in over fifty episodes of Millennial Jenny, which too received several local and international award nominations.

== Filmography ==
=== Film ===
- The Tank (2023) as Linda
- Prequel 87' (2018) as Jean
- Kiwi (2018) as Kelly
- Ripple (2017) as Kerry-Anne

=== Television ===
- Shortland Street (2018–present) as Zoe Carlson
- Head High (2021) as Frankie
- Mean Mums (2019–2020) as Tessa
- Auckward Love (2015–2018) Alice
- American Playboy: The Hugh Hefner Story (2017) as Teddy Howard
- Nothing Trivial (2014)
- Crackhead (2026)

=== Web ===
- Perfect People (2022) as Lilian
- Millennial Jenny (2018–present) as Jenny

=== Theatre ===
- Royals Of Kihikihi (2014) as Violet
- Crunchy Silk (2014) as Astrid
- Thirteen (2012) as Sarah

== Awards ==
- Best Acting Ensemble: Narrative - Millenial Jenny (joint winner) at New Zealand Webfest 2022
- Best Web Series – Lake View International Film Festival 2022
- Best Actress – Bridgefest 2021
- Best Writer – NZ Webfest 2021
- Best Show – NZ Webfest 2020
- Best Acting Ensemble – NZ Webfest 2020
- Alumni Award – NZ Webfest 2020
- Best Show – NZ Webfest 2019
- Best Actress – NZ Webfest 2017
- Best Screenplay for an International Web-series – Melbourne Webfeet 2016

== Personal life ==
Shervey is engaged to New Zealand actor Emmett Skilton. Skilton is a director and actor in both Auckward Love and Millennial Jenny. As of 2026, the couple have one child.
