= The Making of the Mob: Chicago =

American television miniseries

- Genre: Historical drama
- Written by: Brian Burstein; Chelsea Coates; Carter Figueroa; Zachary Herrmann; Jeremiah Murphy; Jordan Rosenblum; David Schaye
- Directed by: John Ealer
- Starring: Michael Kotsohilis; Paolo Rotondo; Jason Fitch; Christopher Valente; Emmett Skilton
- Narrated by: Jeremy Davidson
- Country of origin: United States
- Original language: English
- No. of episodes: 8

Production
- Executive producer: Stephen David
- Producers: Carter Figueroa; Jonathan Soule
- Cinematography: Andrew Huebscher
- Editors: Tim W. Kelly (lead); Jonathan Soule (lead); John Kilgour; Wyatt Rogowski
- Running time: 60 minutes
- Production companies: Stephen David Entertainment; AMC Studios

Original release
- Network: AMC
- Release: July 11 – August 29, 2016

Related
- The Making of the Mob: New York

The Making of the Mob: Chicago is an American television miniseries, and the second season of The Making of the Mob, based on the iconic Chicago gangster Al Capone and his rise and fall in the Chicago Mafia. It is produced by Stephen David and premiered on July 11, 2016, on AMC in eight parts.

== Plot ==
Opening Introduction (narrated by Jeremy Davidson, who narrated this season):

At the beginning of the 20th century, Chicago is one of the most corrupt places in America. But in the heart of the city, a young gangster from Brooklyn rises to the top. Al Capone. In less than a decade, the ruthless gangster will create an empire, pulling in millions, eliminating all rivals, and transforming the Chicago Mafia into the most successful criminal syndicate in the country, known as the Outfit. Capone lays the foundation for a new generation of mobsters who build a city of sin, face-off with a political dynasty, and cement the Chicago Mafia's place in history.

== Production ==
The Making of the Mob: Chicago was filmed in New Zealand in 2015, at Studio West in West Auckland.

== Release ==
The first trailer, released in June 2016, promoted the "8-part premiere event" and a July 11, 2016, release date. It featured the tagline, "They built Las Vegas, but they owned Chicago."

== Cast ==
=== Main ===
The Outfit:

- Michael Kotsohilis as Al Capone – The Boss
- Paolo Rotondo as Johnny 'The Fox' Torrio – The Mentor
- Jason Fitch as Tony Accardo – The Enforcer
- Christopher Valente as Paul 'The Waiter' Ricca – The Brains
- Emmett Skilton as Sam 'Momo' Giancana – The Wild Card

=== Recurring ===
- Andrew Robertt as Frankie Yale
- Amelia Reynolds as Mae Coughlan
- Andre King as Big Jim Colosimo
- George H. Xanthis as Frank Capone
- Josh Harriman as Ralph 'Bottles' Capone
- Stephen Lovatt as Dean 'Dion' O'Banion
- Kip Chapman as Earl 'Hymie' Weiss
- Jack Barry as George 'Bugs' Moran
- Owen Black as Frank 'The Enforcer' Nitti
- Emmett Skilton as Sam 'Momo' Giancana
- Toby Leach as William Dever
- Cohen Holloway as Jack 'Machine Gun Jack' McGurn
- Ruth Wynne as Anna Torrio

== Interviews ==
Each episode features several interviews from celebrities, authors, historians and political figures.

- Deidre Capone – grand-niece of Al Capone, author, Uncle Al
- Laurence Bergreen – author, Capone: The Man and the Era
- Jonathan Eig – author, Get Capone, Luckiest Man
- William Forsythe – actor, The Untouchables, Once Upon a Time in America and The Mob Doctor
- Frank Calabrese – former Chicago Outfit associate
- Robert Lombardo – author, Organized Crime in Chicago
- John Binder – author, The Chicago Outfit
- Rich Cohen – journalist
- Karen Abbott – author, Sin in the Second City
- T.J. English – author, Paddy Whacked
- Vincent Pastore – actor, The Sopranos
- John Kass – columnist, Chicago Tribune
- John Russick – curator, Chicago History Museum
- Frank Cullotta – former Chicago Outfit associate
- Paul Sorvino – actor, Goodfellas
- Hillel Levin – co-author, When Corruption Was King
- Michael S. Green, Ph.D. – professor, (UNLV) historian and board member with the Mob Museum
- Michael Madsen – actor, Donnie Brasco
- Oscar Goodman – former mayor of Las Vegas, cameo in Casino
- Nathan Thompson – author, Kings: The True Story of Chicago's Policy Kings
- David Eisenbach – historian
- Robert Grant - former Chicago FBI chief
- Billy Drago - author, played Frank Nitti in The Untouchables

== Episodes ==
No. overall	No. in season	Title	Original release date	US viewers (millions)
9	1	"Capone's First Kill"	July 11, 2016	1.18
In 1913 Brooklyn, New York, 14-year-old Al Capone begins running errands for local gangsters, including working as a runner for Johnny Torrio of the Five Points Gang, to earn money for his family. Torrio sees potential in Capone and teaches him about bookkeeping. A few years later, Torrio leaves New York for business in Chicago. Capone works for hitman Frankie Yale as a barman in Coney Island, where he gets into a fight after talking to a gangster's girl. Capone acquires the nickname "Scarface" from the slashes he received. After dating Mae Coughlan for two months, they start a family. Capone works for Yale to collect a debt from Tony Peretta, who he shoots dead after Peretta refuses to pay. He then moves his family to Baltimore, Maryland for a legitimate job at a construction company. When his son is baptized, Torrio asks Al for help with his rackets. Capone moves to Chicago in the winter of 1919 to work for Torrio. They run the business at the Four Deuces, a tavern, gambling hall, and brothel. However, they must give half of the profits to South Side kingpin "Big Jim" Colosimo. After Prohibition begins, Torrio goes behind Big Jim's back to go into bootlegging and buys beer breweries, charging triple for illegal booze. Convinced Big Jim knows about it and will order a hit on them, Torrio hires Yale to take him out. Big Jim is gunned down on May 11, 1920; his murder goes unsolved. Torrio takes control of his empire, becoming a kingpin. They start to move their supply into the North Side, which enrages the Irish gangsters.
10	2	"A Death in the Family"	July 18, 2016	0.706
In less than two years, Al Capone rose from a bookkeeper to second-in-command to Johnny Torrio's criminal empire. By 1920, they expanded their operation in Chicago's South Side to millions of dollars. Capone buys a house in the city and moves his entire family from New York to live with him, including his brothers Frank and Ralph. But their business pushes into the North Side, an area that's controlled by the second-largest gang, the Irish. Their success is challenged by Irish leader Dean O'Banion, who also has a legitimate business as the city's top florist. He relies on his two lieutenants, Hymie Weiss, a smart but dangerous businessman and Bugs Moran, his muscle, to keep everything in check. Torrio arranges a meeting with O'Banion and they agree to form an alliance, wiping out small gangs together. Torrio also goes after political corruption and buys off the highest-ranking official, Mayor "Big Bill" Thompson and his police force. The mafia now runs the city and the citizens have had enough of the violence. But new mayor William Dever, who can't be bought, forces Torrio and Capone to shut down. In 1924, they move their bootlegging business out of Chicago and set up shop in nearby Cicero, a small suburb just outside the city. When Torrio goes to Italy to aid his dying mother, 24-year-old Al is left in charge and sets up a casino, the Hawthorne Inn. For help he turns to his brothers; older brother Ralph is heads up daily operations and younger, flashy Frank handles the bribes. While in town, Frank fixes the elections by intimidating voters at booths and shooting up polling places. Frank end up in hot water and the townsfolk turn to Dever whose undercover agents posing as civilian peace enforcers guns him down in the street. Frank's death marks the beginning of a darker period for Capone where he will see his own men killed and murder to hold onto power. He prepares for war with Dever.
11	3	"Blood Filled Streets"	July 25, 2016	0.743
Johnny Torrio and Al Capone have become two of the biggest kingpins in Chicago, and they're about to become even bigger. In the spring of 1924, Irish leader Dean O'Banion meets with Torrio and offers to sell him his whole bootlegging operation for half a million dollars because he wants to retire. Torrio is tempted and brings a suitcase full of money with him to O'Banion's Sieben Brewery warehouse. However, it's a set up as the police rush in to arrest Torrio and he's sent to prison. So after years of peace with the Irish, their partner, O'Banion, betrays the Italians. In retaliation, Torrio wants O'Banion killed and with months of planning, he's gunned down in his own flower shop while working on an expensive flower arrangement order called in for Torrio. After the Irish's gang leader demise, Torrio and Capone attend O'Banion's funeral to disrespect his memory. Meanwhile, the gangland battles of the Beer Wars escalate, and Torrio gets in the cross hairs of O'Banion's top lieutenants Bugs Moran and Hymie Weiss, and he's shot while shopping with his wife. Even after miraculously surviving the shootout with five bullets to the chest, Torrio decides he's had enough of the violent mob life and leaves Capone in charge of his entire empire at only 25-years-old. In one of his first high-profile moves as boss, Capone takes out a hit on Hymie Weiss, and he's murdered in the street. This move establishes Capone as the most powerful gangster in Chicago. Capone then assembles his new gang, The Outfit, and surrounds himself with the best enforcers he can trust; Tony Accardo and Frank Nitti, along with his brains, Paul Ricca. Together, they intend to run the city their way.
12	4	"St. Valentine's Day Massacre"	August 1, 2016	0.810
At the height of his power in 1927, Al Capone, now the head of the Chicago Mafia, decides to get out of Cicero and moves back to where it all started; Chicago. It's been nearly four years since Capone was driven out by Mayor Dever, so Capone funds 'Big' Bill Thompson who wins easily. Capone takes over the top floor of the Lexington Hotel and invites the press up to his workspace. Capone enlists his associates to run his day-to-day operations; Frank Nitti manages finances, Paul Ricca is his deal-maker and emissary, and enforcer Tony Accardo works as his chief bodyguard. With all the media coverage, Capone is a celebrity and he indulges in all the Roaring Twenties has to offer, including cocaine. Meanwhile, Irish gangster Bugs Moran targets those closest to Capone. On March 7, 1928, Moran puts a hit on Jack McGurn who killed Hymie Weiss, but he survives the shooting. Capone wants to take out Moran's gang all at once, so he devises a meticulous plan. First, he hires Sicilian hitmen, John Scalise and Albert Anselmi. Then to get Moran's gang in one location, they arrange for their liquor dealer to set up a buy. Next, they set up a fake police raid by stealing officer uniforms and a cop car. Lastly, Capone leaves for Miami so he can't be connected to the hit. Disguised as cops, Capone's assassins invade Irish territory to execute a hit that will change American history. On February 14, 1929, at 10:30 a.m., seven of Moran's men are lined up against a brick wall and are gunned down in a hail of Tommy gun bullets. The incident is the biggest in gang history and is known as the Saint Valentine's Day Massacre. Not included in the execution is Bugs Moran who was running late; He's been defeated and leaves town. The Mafia draw unwanted publicity from the authorities, but Capone's convinced nobody can stop him. Scalise and Anselmi plot against Capone and he kills them during dinner. Mafia bosses from back east are fed up with Capone's antics, and on May 13, 1929, New York crime boss Lucky Luciano organizes a secret meeting in Atlantic City in how to deal with Capone. While most mobsters want to eliminate him, Luciano sees another way; Capone would go to jail on a minor offense. Four days later, he's imprisoned at Moyamensing Prison in Philadelphia. While there, he keeps up his lavish lifestyle with his cell decorated in the finest furnishings. After spending 10 months in prison, he faces a changed world with the Great Depression and President Herbert Hoover declaring war on him. Leading the operation is a young Prohibition Bureau agent named Eliot Ness who uses wiretaps to listen in on Capone's rackets. On June 13, 1930, Ness raids one of Capone's breweries, arresting his men. When Ness refuses Capone's bribe, he and his team are known as 'The Untouchables'.
13	5	"Judgment Day"	August 8, 2016	0.631
When Eliot Ness aims his sights on Al Capone, he orders a hit on the young Prohibition Bureau agent. However, Ness narrowly escapes and it becomes personal; he will do everything he can to take Capone and his kingpin empire down. Determined to prove to Capone that he's not intimidated, Ness and his team of "Untouchables" execute a series of high-profile raids on Capone's breweries. Over the course of months, they destroy over 200 gallons of beer, and the newspapers cover it all. But Ness isn't the only one trying to take down Capone; the Internal Revenue Service has been going over the infamous gangster for the past four years, building another case on him for tax evasion. Leading the IRS investigation is accountant Frank Wilson who has an undercover agent working within Capone's organization. For the past two years, Mike Malone has worked to gain the trust of Capone's gang. Ness plans another raid, but Capone is ready by paying off the telephone company in exchange for wiretaps on the phone lines of Ness and his agents. After his brewery raid is a bust, Ness is left humiliated. Once again, Capone evades the law, however, Wilson targets Capone's head of finance Frank Nitti who has a personal bank account with un-taxed money, and he is sent to jail. Capone's men plan to take out Wilson, but they're unaware that Malone heard everything and warns him. After scouring through paperwork, Wilson finds a ledger from one of Capone's raided casinos and he finally connects the mob boss to his illegal operations. Capone is indicted for tax evasion but he pays his bail at the local police station, and he is out on bail. But Ness hits Capone with 5,000 bootlegging charges. Using their connections at city hall, Capone's men start a bribery campaign and he gets all the jurors on his side. But the jury is switched by the Judge James Wilkerson and Capone is found guilty. On October 24, 1931, Capone gets the maximum sentence of 11 years in prison with a $50,000 fine on all charges. Even though he wasn’t able to get Capone on Prohibition violations, Ness becomes a legend. While in jail, Capone bribes the warden for preferential treatment and runs his empire from the inside. But he is caught and is transferred to a federal prison in Atlanta. With all his power stripped away, Capone looks to his top lieutenants to take the reins of his criminal empire he built. And if they can't handle the job, he will lose everything.
14	6	"New Blood"	August 15, 2016	0.757
In 1934, Al Capone finds himself locked up in federal prison Atlanta. But just over two years in his 11-year sentence, Capone is hand-selected by the president to be transferred to America's newest and harshest maximum security prison—Alcatraz, and lives in dire conditions on the secluded island. Meanwhile in Chicago, the empire he left behind is dealing with a new problem—Prohibition has recently been repealed and one of The Outfit's most important sources of income dries up. With Capone cut off from them, his most-trusted men, Frank Nitti, Tony Accardo, and Paul Ricca must keep his organization afloat as when their boss returns, and Nitti takes the reins. With thousands of Americans flocking to the theaters, the film industry is raking in millions of dollars a month. So Nitti wants to hold the movie business hostage. He hires street thug Willie Bioff who's been extorting local cinemas by forcing their projectionists to go on strike unless theaters agree to pay him a large fee. Nitti wants Bioff to use the same tactic, but at the major film studios in Hollywood and he immediately infiltrates Tinsel Town’s labor unions. He uses his power for strikes on film productions, unless the executives agree to pay The Outfit big money. With each shakedown, Bioff lives the highlife out in the open while Nitti and Ricca are rolling in the money. But Capone's enforcer, Accardo, aka "Joe Batters", is worried he'll be left behind if he doesn't bring in money himself. He breaks into the slot machine racket and works with second-in-command Ricca building a network of slots in bars. After spending seven years in prison, Capone is released on November 16, 1939, in Lewisburg. But the kingpin is a shell of his former self as years of frequenting prostitutes has finally caught up with him in the form of a debilitating disease; tertiary syphilis, and his mind starts to mentally slip. After rounds of experimental treatments, Capone moves to his estate in Miami to live under the care of his family. Since there isn't a cure, he's in a fog of dementia. Losing Capone is devastating for the top-lieutenants and things go from bad to worse when Bioff is arrested and rats out Nitti and Ricca. Responsible for Bioff, Nitti doesn't want go back to prison so he takes his own life on March 19, 1943, and Ricca is forced to take the fall. In December, he's convicted for the movie extortion scheme and sentenced to ten years in prison. Accardo, with a 6-grade education, is left to be the new boss, but Ricca remains his consultant. Accardo hires Ricca's former bootleg driver-turned gangster, Sam Giancana. Called "Mooney" because he's a loose cannon, Sam takes over his cellmate Eddie Jones' policy wheels numbers racket, an illegal lottery run by black gangster Theodore Roe who is killed in the process. Just as things improve for The Outfit, on January 25, 1947, Accardo learns that his mentor and the most notorious gangster in America is dead at the age of 48. Out of respect, Accardo is rumored to have sent Capone's wife, Mae, money to live off of until her death in 1986. After his death, Capone becomes an even bigger legend, inspiring countless books, movies and TV shows.
15	7	"Sin City"	August 22, 2016	0.822
A month after Al Capone's death, Paul Ricca emerges from prison and takes his place alongside Tony Accardo as co-head of The Outfit, which is making more money than before thanks to the policy racket. Unlike their former boss, they must be discreet with their profits, so they decide to go underground, needing a place to hide it. In 1955, they find their answer in a growing city in the middle of the Mojave Desert where gambling is legal—Las Vegas, Nevada. But the New York mob is already there, led by criminal mastermind Meyer Lansky. He runs the Flamingo, a luxury hotel and casino founded by Bugsy Siegel. The Chicago mafia want in and go to Lansky offering him a partnership. Both mobs work together laundering money and building casinos, including the Tropicana in what will become the Las Vegas Strip. Sam Giancana is in charge of running the operation and a lot of Chicago gangsters move out west, including one who's just arrived—the man who broke the mob's code of silence by ratting out Sam's mentor—Willie Bioff. Ricca orders a hit on Bioff and he's killed by a car bomb. Soon the allure of the Strip attracts celebrities. And as the money pours in, The Outfit comes up with a way to make even more by skimming; taking money off the tables before it can be recorded in the books or being taxed. They start rigging the slot machines and the money scales before getting to the counting room. On May 2, 1957, in New York City, an incident threatens everything the mob has built when New York mob boss Frank Costello is shot. But, he miraculously survives. As he recovers, the police discover a piece of paper that suggests there was money coming out of the Tropicana, exposing the mafia's ties to Las Vegas. The banks aren't going to lend any more money for construction loans to build casinos. To get the money they need, Accardo turns to a high-ranking officer in the country's largest labor union; the Teamsters president Jimmy Hoffa. He allows The Outfit to take millions of dollars from the union's pension funds, financing Las Vegas' growth. Not wanting to be in the public eye, Ricca and Accardo name Giancana who likes a flashy lifestyle, the acting boss. But he becomes the target of a young U.S. Senate attorney seeking an opportunity to make a name for himself by going after organized crime; Robert F. Kennedy. During the McClellan Committee Hearings, Kennedy uncovers a link between Hoffa and organized crime. He then subpoenas Giancana, who skips town for a year, taking on aliases. But he refuses to keep a low profile and goes to the Chicago Tribune press. On June 9, 1959, Giancano arrives in Washington, D.C. to go head-to-head with Bobby Kennedy. Giancana pleads the fifth, declining to answer questions that will incriminate him. To Accardo, Giancana becomes a liability, risking bringing down the Chicago mob. Ricca tries to rein in his protégé but in the midst of the feud, he's arrested for tax evasion and is sent to prison again. But the government isn't finished and gets the Nevada Gaming Control Board to put Giancana's name on a list of persons barred from entering casinos.
16	8	"Last Man Standing"	August 29, 2016	0.939
In 1960, head of the Chicago mob, Tony Accardo sits at the top of the country's most powerful crime syndicate, The Outfit. But he's facing his biggest challenge yet, after his second in command, acting boss Sam Giancana becomes a target of the federal government, drawing more unwanted attention to the organization. A feud between the two mob bosses reaches a breaking point, however, one phone call changes everything. It's self-made businessman Joseph P. Kennedy and he wants a sit-down, so in February they meet with him to discuss his senator son, John who's running for office. Joe asks them for help with the electoral votes in Illinois, a critical state, in exchange for Robert Kennedy to back off his investigation against Sam. On November 8, at The Outfit delivers the right number of votes and JFK is elected president of the United States. But just weeks after he takes office, Robert is elected attorney general and now has the power to lead a full-scale investigation into the mafia. For months, he targets Giancana by using unauthorized stakeouts and wiretaps. When he is followed by federal agents everywhere he goes, Sam files a lawsuit against the F.B.I. for harassment, taking them to court. In the summer of 1963, a judge rules that the F.B.I. has gone too far, and orders them to limit their surveillance on Sam. But Giancana's victory is short-lived, by suing the government; it put an even bigger target on his back. Fed-up with all of it, Accardo calls a meeting with his co-boss, Paul Ricca, who's recently been released after serving 27 months in prison. They decide to settle things...permanently. Before, they can put their plan in motion, an event changes the course of history. On November 22, 1963, President John F. Kennedy, the man The Outfit helped elect, is assassinated in Dallas, Texas. After his brother's death, Robert steps down from his post. A new threat emerges when the government launches an investigation into his assassination with rumors circulating that the mafia was involved. People believe Lee Harvey Oswald was a mob hitman and along came Jack Ruby shooting him on live television. With the pressure mounting, Accardo knows it's no time for a high-profile hit and he comes up with another way to get rid of Giancana for good; they kick him out of the organization. On March 27, 1967, Accardo ties off any loose ends by selling one of his top Vegas hotels, the Desert Inn, to eccentric billionaire Howard Hughes. His deal ushers in a new era in Las Vegas when he cashes out at the Sands and buys the mob's Frontier Hotel. In 1969, the Nevada Gaming Commission makes it legal for corporations to buy casinos. The Outfit walks away with $400 million in today's money. But Accardo receives devastating news; on October 11, 1972, his friend of 40 years who served with him under Al Capone, Paul Ricca dies of a heart attack. Shortly after, Accardo gets more bad news. Seven years of forced exile in Mexico, Giancana is back to town and he's talking to the Feds. With nearly three decades of information on The Outfit, Giancana is not only a threat to him, but to the future of the entire Chicago mafia. On June 19, 1975, Giancana is shot to death in the basement of his suburban home in Oak Park by an unknown assassin. Accardo orders that no member attend his funeral. In Detroit on July 30, 1975, Outfit partner, Jimmy Hoffa disappears the same day he agreed to meet with two men connected to the mob, and his remains are never found. Accardo is the only gangster left from Capone’s time and retires from the mob. He keeps a low-profile as a beer salesman for Fox Head Brewing Company and filing tax returns. He also built a diverse business portfolio, earning him an untold fortune. In 1992, after a 70-year career in the mafia, Accardo dies peacefully surrounded by family, having never spent a day in prison.
