= The Making of the Mob =

- Genre: Docuseries
- Narrated by: Ray Liotta
- Country of origin: United States
- Original language: English
- No. of seasons: 2
- No. of episodes: 16 (list of episodes)

Production
- Executive producers: Eliot Goldberg; Marco Bresaz; Stephen David

Original release
- Network: AMC
- Release: June 15, 2015 – August 29, 2016

The Making of the Mob is an American television docu-series detailing the emergence of organized crime in 20th-century America. The series premiered on June 15, 2015, on AMC, and is narrated by actor Ray Liotta. The series also features intercuts within each episode of archival footage and interviews with historians, authors, actors, law enforcement personnel, and family members. On July 31, 2015, AMC renewed the series for a second season of eight episodes, which premiered on July 11, 2016.

== Overview ==
Season	Episodes	Originally released	
Season	Episodes	First released	Last released
1	8	June 15, 2015	August 3, 2015
2	8	July 11, 2016	August 29, 2016

== Production ==
On January 10, 2015, AMC ordered the series as a "special event" miniseries to air in mid-2015. On July 31, 2015, two weeks after the series premiere, AMC renewed it for a second season to air in mid-2016.

== Reception ==
The first season received mixed responses from television critics and a Metacritic score of 59 out of 100, based on six reviews, indicating "mixed or average reviews". The review aggregator website Rotten Tomatoes reported a 40% "rotten" critics rating based on five reviews.
