= Colin Bouwer =

South African-born doctor and murderer

- Born: 1950; South Africa
- Died: 15 August 2018 (aged 67–68); Ramsgate, KwaZulu-Natal, South Africa
- Occupation: Psychiatrist
- Status: Paroled, Deported
- Conviction: Murder
- Penalty: Life imprisonment, minimum 15 years

Colin Bouwer (1950 – 15 August 2018) was a South African-born New Zealand former doctor who rose to become Head of Psychiatry at the University of Otago in Dunedin, New Zealand. He spent 16 years in prison for the murder of his third wife Annette. His crime was dramatised in the TV movie Bloodlines, with Bouwer being portrayed by Mark Mitchinson. His son from a previous marriage was also convicted of an unrelated murder in 2003. His first wife was also convicted of helping their son cover up his crime.

== Early life ==
Bouwer was born in 1950. He married his third wife Annette in 1981 and migrated to New Zealand with her and their children in 1997. He had left South Africa shortly after being declared an "impaired" doctor by the South African Health Professions Council due to a pethidine addiction. He claimed he was a member of the African National Congress (ANC) and had been imprisoned for resisting apartheid, though these claims were later revealed to be untrue. After moving to New Zealand, he became the head of the Department of Psychological Medicine of the University of Otago's medical school at Dunedin Hospital.

== Murder ==
Bouwer drugged his wife to simulate the symptoms of a pancreatic tumour. He used a combination of sedatives and hypoglycaemia-inducing drugs obtained with forged prescriptions. Annette was subjected to months of medical tests, including an operation. She was declared dead on 5 January 2000.

== Police investigation ==
Dr. Andrew Bowers, who had treated Annette, refused to sign her death certificate without a post-mortem. Bouwer objected to a post-mortem but was overruled. He claimed that his wife was Jewish and therefore had to be buried within 48 hours of dying, but her funeral was conducted in an Anglican church. The vicar was puzzled by Bouwer's behaviour and stated that the house seemed to have been disinfected. Significant levels of sedatives and insulin were found in her blood, and a further investigation showed they had been obtained via 11 forged prescriptions. Bouwer claimed he was suffering from cancer and depression and had obtained the drugs to take his own life by suicide.

The police found a string of email inquiries he had sent to hypoglycaemia experts, claiming he was a forensic psychiatrist. In particular he asked how likely an insulin injection was to be determined as the cause of death.

The police established that Bouwer was having a relationship with Dr. Anne Walshe. Within weeks of their relationship beginning, he began obtaining the forged prescriptions. Walshe was not suspected of being involved in (or even being aware of) Bouwer's activities. Walshe claims she did not sleep with Bouwer until after Annette died, and believes he is innocent, stating, "He did not murder his wife and he is not a cold, calculating murderer. He's a very gentle man." His children, likewise, assert their belief that their mother died by suicide.

== Trial ==
The prosecution argued that Bouwer killed his wife to obtain her life insurance and presented over 150 witnesses. His sister-in-law revealed that he claimed New Zealand was an ideal place to commit the perfect murder. Bouwer claimed he had undergone treatment for cancer in a South African hospital; however the doctors he claimed had operated on him testified they had never met him. It was also revealed that Bouwer had told medical students that injecting someone between the toes with insulin was the perfect way to commit a murder. On 19 November 2001, the jury took less than two hours to find him guilty (at the time, one of the fastest murder verdicts in years) and he was sentenced to life in prison with a minimum term of 13 years. The sentence was increased to 15 years following an appeal by the Crown. Bouwer's appeal was denied. He has since been described as a psychopath.

== Release ==
On 18 September 2015, Bouwer was refused parole, and consequently had to serve at least another year. At his parole hearing, Bouwer changed his original defence, stating that his wife's death was assisted suicide, and that he had been advised against using this defence at his trial. Though he indicated his intention to apply for parole again the following year, his lawyer stated that his ill health prevented it. In late 2016, he petitioned Associate Immigration Minister Craig Foss, requesting that Foss intervene and cancel his deportation order, but Foss refused. In 2017, Bouwer was paroled and deported to South Africa.

In 2021, it was reported that Bouwer had died in 2018 of natural causes.
