= The Making of the Mob: New York =

- Genre: Historical drama
- Written by: Stephen David; Tim W. Kelly; John Ealer; Brian Burstein; Claire Lawton; Ron Fried; Rebecca Haber; Jim Rapsas; Alec Michod; Dave Schaye; Jonathan Brandeis
- Directed by: John Ealer
- Starring: Rich Graff; Ian Bell; Anthony DiCarlo; Jonathan C. Stewart; Craig Thomas Rivela
- Narrated by: Ray Liotta
- Theme music composer: Joe Eslick
- Opening theme: "The Drifter"
- Country of origin: United States
- Original language: English
- No. of episodes: 8

Production
- Executive producer: Stephen David
- Producers: Ron Fried; Claire Lawton; Alec Miclod; Joey Marra; Jim Rapsas; Brian Burstein
- Production locations: New York City; Los Angeles
- Cinematography: Andrew Huebscher
- Editors: Tim W. Kelly (lead); Jonathan Soule (lead); James Lester; Vanessa Procopio Pumo; Drew Oberholtzer; Evald Ridore; Jared Dubrino; Sujit Agrawal; Jevon Roush; Emmanuel Nomikos
- Production companies: Stephen David Entertainment; AMC Studios

Original release
- Network: AMC
- Release: June 15 – August 3, 2015

Related
- The Making of the Mob: Chicago

The Making of the Mob: New York is an American television miniseries, and the first season of The Making of the Mob. It follows notorious New York gangster Lucky Luciano and his rise in the New York City crime mob, alongside Meyer Lansky, Frank Costello, Bugsy Siegel, and Vito Genovese. It is produced by Stephen David and aired from June 15 to August 3, 2015, on AMC in eight parts.

A ratings success, the series led to a renewal by AMC for a second season, subtitled Chicago, which documents the emergence of organized crime in the American Midwest through the rise and fall of the iconic gangster Al Capone.

== Plot ==
Opening Introduction (narrated by Ray Liotta, who narrated the entire series):

From the chaos of the New York City streets, rises a legion of visionary gangsters. Vicious killers and criminal geniuses determined to create their own version of the American Dream. Lucky Luciano, Meyer Lansky, Bugsy Siegel, Vito Genovese and Frank Costello form alliances and revolutionize the underworld. Over a 50-year period, these ambitious, young immigrants come together to form the American mafia. Making millions, killing thousands, and changing the face of crime forever. Their authority stretches across two continents, impacting global wars and creating empires.

== Release ==
The first trailer, released on April 12, 2015, promoted the "8-part premiere event" and June 15, 2015 release date, and featured the tagline, "Lucky Luciano is the ruler of the most powerful criminal organization this city has ever known."

The series premiered in Australia on Arena on December 9, 2015.

== Cast ==
=== Main ===
- Rich Graff as Charles "Lucky" Luciano
- Ian Bell (actor) as Meyer Lansky
- Anthony DiCarlo as Frank Costello
- Jonathan C. Stewart as Benjamin "Bugsy" Siegel
- Craig Thomas Rivela as Vito Genovese

=== Recurring ===
- Gus Zucco as Albert Anastasia
- Stelio Savante as Joe Masseria
- Umberto Celisano as Al Capone
- Roberto De Felice as Salvatore Maranzano
- James Kacey as Joe Bonanno
- Richard L. Adams as Ralph the Booker
- Adam Jonas Segaller as Thomas E. Dewey
- Sam Little as Abe Reles
- Evan Boymel as Louis Lepke Buchalter
- Christopher Morrow as Dutch Schultz
- Noah Forrest as Carlo Gambino
- Caleb McDaniel as Tommy Gagliano
- James Davenjay as Pete La Tempa
- Anthony Bisciello as Joe Profaci
- Gregory Cioffi as Tommy Lucchese
- Daniel Jordano as Vincent Mangano
- Sam McCrea as William C. Dodge
- Raffaela Perra as Igea Lissoni
- Jessica Brodkin as Lauretta Giegerman Costello
- Yeshe Pfeifer as Anna Genovese
- Rick Borgia as Older Lucky Luciano
- Rachel Whitman Groves as "Cokey Flo" Florence Brown
- Marija Skangale as Galina "Gay" Orlova

== Interviews ==
Each episode features several interviews from celebrities, authors, historians and political figures.

- Rudy Giuliani – former mayor of New York City
- Selwyn Raab – author, Five Families
- David Pietrusza – author, Rothstein
- Meyer Lansky II – grandson of Meyer Lansky
- Michael Green – historian, University of Nevada Las Vegas
- Rich Cohen – author, Tough Jews
- Vincent Pastore – actor, The Sopranos
- Alexander Hortis – author, The Mob and the City
- Gay Talese – author, Honor Thy Father
- Richard Hammer – author, The Last Testament of Lucky Luciano
- Joe Mantegna – actor, The Godfather Part III
- Salvatore Polisi – former Mafia associate
- Chazz Palminteri – actor, A Bronx Tale
- Sonny Grosso – retired New York City Police Department detective
- Frank Vincent – actor, Goodfellas
- Thomas Dewey III – grandson of Thomas Dewey
- Frankie Valli – singer, The Four Seasons
- Oscar Goodman – former mayor of Las Vegas
- Ellen Poulsen – author, The Case Against Lucky Luciano
- Drea de Matteo – actress, The Sopranos
- Edward McDonald – federal prosecutor
- Edwin Torres – New York Supreme Court judge
- H. W. Brands – historian, University of Texas at Austin

== Episodes ==
No. overall	No. in season	Title	Original release date	US viewers (millions)
1	1	"The Education of Lucky Luciano"	June 15, 2015	1.18
In 1931, "Lucky" Luciano calls the most powerful gangsters in the country to a hotel in Chicago for a meeting that will change the face of American organized crime. He gets rid of the "boss of all bosses" with a board of directors and creates the Five Families, giving birth to the modern mafia. It all started in 1906 with a 9-year-old Charles Luciano, a Sicilian immigrant who comes to America with his family in hope of a better life. But while living in a cramped tenement in New York City, it's not what they expect. By 1912, having to scrape by, 15-year-old Luciano tries to make an honest living, but soon turns to a life of crime and joins one of the dozens of gangs in the neighborhood. Instead of sticking with an Italian gang he joins a Jewish one, teaming up with Russian immigrant Meyer Lansky and Ben "Bugsy" Siegel, a brash Jewish kid from Brooklyn. As criminal kingpin Joe Masseria takes over the Lower East Side, Luciano and his childhood friends rise through the ranks as low-level gangster Frank Costello's recruits running gambling rackets until 1919 when they meet enforcer Vito Genovese. On August 11, 1922, at age 25, Luciano commits his first murder on the orders of "Joe the Boss" when he guns down Umberto Valenti in the street. Even though his debt is paid, he is now under Masseria's control and gets into selling heroin. After Luciano serves a six months sentence in prison for dealing, Lansky sets up a meeting with gambler and racketeer Arnold Rothstein who teaches Luciano how to be a businessman. During Prohibition, they make a fortune with their bootlegging business. However, they must give Masseria a cut of their profits, causing Luciano to plan a hit on him.
2	2	"Equal Opportunity Gangster"	June 22, 2015	1.10
By 1928, Lucky and his gang are successful criminals bent on taking out the most powerful gangster in the city. However, their plans are halted when Rothstein is gunned down over a gambling debt. In the wake of his mentor's death, Lucky reads that the federal government is cracking down on gang activity and special task forces raid speakeasies and mob headquarters. This nationwide effort to take down mobsters was triggered by the actions of notorious gangster Al Capone with the St. Valentine's Day Massacre in Chicago. During a mob convention hosted by Enoch "Nucky" Johnson at his casino in Atlantic City, Lucky convinces Capone to take the fall, pleading to a minor charge. When the stock market crashes, Lucky gains power in the underworld during the Great Depression and develops a new racket by providing high interest rate loans to failing businesses, creating loan sharks. In 1931, Sicilian mob boss Salvatore Maranzano flees Benito Mussolini's fascist Italy, setting up shop in New York City. He destroys Joe Masseria's warehouse and starts an all-out turf war between the two bosses, known as the Castellammarese War. Lucky earns his nickname when he is kidnapped and tortured by Maranzano's men to send a message, dumping him in Staten Island. Lucky forges an alliance with the man who had beaten him within an inch of his life by taking out Joe the Boss when he's dining at a restaurant. But when Maranzano declares himself capo di tutti capi and hires a hitman to kill those he doesn't trust, Lucky is at the top of the list. It's killed or be killed, so Lucky gets to the boss of all bosses first by having his men disguise themselves as IRS agents to carry out the hit. In less than five months, Lucky has just taken out the two biggest mob bosses and becomes the king of New York.
3	3	"King of New York"	June 29, 2015	0.982
After taking out the two most powerful mob bosses in the city, Lucky, now 34 years old, plans to seize control of the New York Mafia. He sends out an army of hit men to eliminate old regimes and in just two days mobsters are murdered, but he saves a select few as allies. One of these men is Joe Bonanno, who's not tied to the old Sicilian ways and makes him head of his own crime family. Lucky creates an organization that won't war with each other and turns to his homeland for his inspiration. He sets up a Cosa Nostra in America with one big change—there will be no more capo di tutti capi. Instead there will be a board of directors called "The Commission", a power-sharing group made up of heads of the Five Families who will run the Mafia instead of the boss of bosses. They have the final say on all mob matters, from dividing up territories to ordering hits, and feuds were settled in underworld court. To carry out the mob's approved hit list, Lucky hires a notorious gang of Jewish hit men that will come to be known as Murder, Inc., each with his own signature style of killing. And in just ten years, they will kill a thousand people with hundreds of murders remaining unsolved. Lucky faces his biggest threat from within; Dutch Schutz, known as the beer baron of The Bronx who isn't a part of the Five Families. When Schutz tampered with political elections, he caught the eye of assistant U.S. attorney Thomas E. Dewey. After seeing law enforcement agent Eliot Ness putting Al Capone in jail for tax evasion, he follows his lead and goes after Schutz on the same charge. With all this unwanted attention from J. Edgar Hoover and his Feds, Schutz plans to kill Dewey. But Lucky has to put a stop to the spotlight Schutz put on everything he built and organizes a hit on him. However, by taking his own man out, Lucky has put himself at the top of Dewey's most wanted list.
4	4	"A Rising Threat"	July 6, 2015	0.937
After taking out Dutch Schultz, the New York mafia has eliminated the greatest threat to their power and is back in business. By 1935, Lucky, now 38 years old and his gang are living the high life as bosses, pulling in the modern day equivalent of over $100 million. Lansky turns his low-rent gambling dens into high-end establishments. Genovese's heroin racket pulls in millions but begins to run high stakes poker games, luring in businessmen and fixing it so he always wins. Siegel, the leader of Murder, Inc. carries out the assassination orders sent down by The Commission. Costello keeps the authorities at bay by paying off corrupt politicians and law enforcement. From his hotel suite at the Waldorf-Astoria, Luciano builds a life with his girlfriend, 20-year-old Broadway dancer, Gay Orlova. While his girl's at home, Lucky looks to expand his criminal operation on the seedier side of the underworld with illegal prostitution. Soon, the kingpin has a network of up to 200 brothels and 1,200 prostitutes in the city. Ignoring Lansky's advice to stay out of this dirty business, Lucky becomes obsessed and spends nights at his own brothel run by madam Cokey Flo. As Dewey builds his case around Luciano, he brings in Eunice Carter, the first African-American assistant district attorney. She discovers a booker connected to the mob is bailing out Lucky's girls and uses the new wiretap, while Dewey organizes a city-wide raid to find Lucky. He escapes to his hideout in corrupt Hot Springs, Arkansas, but the search is widened to a nationwide manhunt. On April 3, 1936, a traveling New York detective recognizes Lucky, and after months on the run, the most powerful gangster is arrested. But he bribes the local sheriff who is unwilling to hand him over to Dewey and Lucky becomes Public Enemy Number One. A day later, Lucky is forced to surrender to the governor's state troopers. Back in New York, Lucky is out of bail facing charges of compulsory prostitution and plans his defense against Dewey for his trial on May 13, 1936 in Supreme Court.
5	5	"Exit Strategy"	July 13, 2015	0.962
On June 6, 1936, after years of eluding the law, Lucky takes the witness stand in Supreme Court and to cross-examine him is Dewey. Lucky's defense team tries to bribe a juror, but the rest finds him guilty on 62 counts of compulsory prostitution. While Luciano is sentenced to 50 years in the remote prison in Dannemora, Dewey becomes a crime busting national hero, inspiring the radio show, Gang Busters. But Lucky figures out how to run his empire from his 8 by 10 foot cell. With the guards on his pay-roll, he enjoys outside luxuries, including fine clothing, booze, and furniture, as well as visits from his associates. Lucky must choose between Costello, the "gentleman gangster" and Genovese, the tough guy hoodlum as head of his gang. Even though, Costello is smarter, Lucky makes him an underboss and promotes Genovese to acting boss. He rules the mob with an iron fist, but lets the power go straight to his head, flaunting his wealth. Genovese can have any woman he wants, but the one he wants is his cousin Anna Petillo. In order to be together he "takes care" of her husband and they soon marry. Under Genovese's reign, the structure of Luciano's crime family collapses as he plays by his own rules, wasting money, abusing authority, and eliminating anyone who disagrees with him; all without The Commission's approval. An inmate looking to reduce his jail time confesses to a murder Genovese ordered, and he has to escape to Italy, making Costello the acting boss. With business running smoothly again, Lucky wants to expand and has Lansky plan a casino in Havana with General Batista, while he sends Siegel to Los Angeles to take control of the Hollywood labor unions. In 1940, sentenced at Sing Sing Prison, Abe Reles begins ratting on Murder, Inc. This causes Costello to order a hit on him, tracking down Reles at the Half Moon Hotel in Coney Island, using his police connections to kill him. Meanwhile, Lucky is determined to get out of prison and his opportunity may come from a battle soon to be waged halfway around the world.
6	6	"The Mob at War"	July 20, 2015	1.04
As Lucky remains in prison keeping his operations under control, he fears the other mob families will try to grab his power if he doesn't get out soon. Lansky and Costello search nationwide for the three prostitutes whose testimony put their boss away. They find the women, who escaped to California and go to a law office to sign a paper saying they lied in court. However, Dewey convinces the judge to dismiss the allegations and Lucky's appeal is denied. Dewey sets his sights on Louis Lepke of Murder, Inc., who the F.B.I. wants to arrest on a narcotics charge. An international manhunt is conducted, but he's in a Brooklyn basement, taking out witnesses so there won't be a case. After a year of searching, Hoover looks to Lucky to give up Lepke and has Lansky double-cross Lepke. He sends Albert Anastasia to convince him to surrender on lesser drug charges, giving Lucky the leverage he needs. Hoover brings Lepke into custody, arresting him for murder and he's sentenced to death in December 1941. Dewey campaigns to become the next governor of New York and Lucky is certain if he wins, he will sign his pardon. But a violent attack on Pearl Harbor changes everything and America joins the fight in World War II. Two months after, a fire breaks out on the S.S. Normandie, a naval troop ship on the West Side docks, fearing the war has reached the city. To prevent sabotage on the waterfront, the government reaches out to Lucky, whose mafia controls 200 ports, and orders a lock down of the docks in the exchange to shorten his sentence. With Lucky doing his part in the war effort, in Forlì, Italy, Genovese strikes a deal with dictator Benito Mussolini by donating millions to his fascist party for the freedom to set up his heroin racket. In July 1943, the Allies invade Sicily and Genovese is on the losing side and switches, becoming a translator for the U.S. Army. When they find out he's wanted for murder, Genovese is brought back to America and thrown in prison on the witness account by one of his mobsters, Peter LaTempa. On January 15, 1945, LaTempa is poisoned in his cell and 4 months later the Allies claim victory in Europe. Lucky writes a letter requesting parole to Dewey, the newly elected governor, but after seven months, there's no response. The navy puts pressure on Dewey, but releasing Lucky would hurt his presidential aspirations, so he deports him to Italy. Forty years after he arrived in America a penniless immigrant, Lucky is forced to leave the country he considers his home and leave his criminal empire behind.
7	7	"New Frontiers"	July 27, 2015	0.901
On February 28, 1946, after ten years in prison, Lucky Luciano is finally a free man. But he's been exiled to Italy, never to return to America. Living in Rome, he's forced to leave the mafia's future in his crew's hands. 4,000 miles away, Costello is acting boss, keeping the peace between the Five Families. Genovese is released from prison only to find himself demoted while Lansky is overseas in Havana, to expand the empire outside the U.S. He's spent years paying off Cuban politician Fulgencio Batista transforming seedy hotels into five-star casinos. After all these years setting up a mob stronghold in Los Angeles, Siegel has nothing to show for it. He sees his opportunity 300 miles east in a stretch of Nevada desert town Las Vegas to set up a legalized gambling mecca. His vision is a European-style mega hotel and casino that will attract celebrities, high rollers, and tourists willing to cough up thousands of dollars a night. He names it after his long-legged girlfriend Virginia Hill's nickname, Flamingo. Lucky gives Siegel money to fund his desert dream, but he'll need a bigger venture to maintain his place in the mafia. He seizes Genovese's heroin ring and converts candy factories into underground labs. He secretly leaves Italy to join Lansky, seeing Cuba as a way to smuggle drugs into America and has a mob meeting (Havana Summit), having well-known singer, Frank Sinatra perform. Everyone is on board, expect Genovese, who feels he deserves a larger cut of the profit for the heroin operation since he was the first to get it going. He contacts Mangano Family underboss Carlo Gambino who helps him plot against Lucky. While in Cuba, the Federal Bureau of Narcotics has Lucky under surveillance, soon learning of his drug ring, he's arrested and brought back to Italy. Siegel's project goes over-budget and borrows more money to complete his luxury hotel. On opening night (December 26, 1946), a storm hits town and with many of the hotel rooms unfinished, costs are overrun and he's forced to close. Later, he finishes guest rooms, pays publicists and calls in favors from his famous friends. Bugsy's big gamble pays off on May 1, 1947, when The Flamingo has a successful re-opening. However, his investors lose patience with him skimming money and he's gunned down in his Beverly Hills home on June 20, 1947; 20 minutes after his murder, Lansky takes control of the hotel. In 1950, U.S. senator Estes Kefauver forms a committee to investigate the mafia and holds a series of televised hearings. Costello is called to trial and thinks he can outwit them, leaving an opportunity for Genovese to take him out.
8	8	"End Game"	August 3, 2015	0.968
On April 19, 1951, a mob boss is violently removed from power when Vincent Mangano, head of one of the Five Families is murdered in Brooklyn. The hit was ordered by his underboss, Albert Anastasia so he can take control of the commission. Luciano, who's exiled in Italy, is forced to watch his criminal empire turning into chaos as gangsters vie for power. With no hope in returning to America, Lucky turns to his advisor Lansky and his acting boss Costello to keep his operation intact. But after Costello's disastrous testimony to the U.S. Senate, the other families see him as weak. Genovese teams up with Mangano underboss Carlo Gambino to reclaim his position as head of the Luciano Family. Costello cracks under pressure and sees a shrink and keeps himself safe with the protection of Willie Moretti, a mobster from New Jersey with ties to Luciano. Gambino eliminates Costello's protection and orders a mercy killing on Moretti, whose brain is deteriorating from syphilis. In May 1957, Gambino hires a hitman to kill Costello. Despite being shot in the head near point blank, he survives. Genovese tells Costello him to retire, but refuses, and after recovering, he and Anastasia form an alliance. The old generation of gangsters, who believed in loyalty is gone and the new generation orders a hit on anyone, including killing Anastasia as he gets a shave at the barber. By taking him out, Gambino has gone from mid-level gangster to the head of his own crime family. The Gambino Family is born, while Costello ends his reign as Luciano Family head, making Genovese the boss. In the Fall of 1957, Genovese invites gangsters from all over the country for a meeting in the deserted farm town of Apalachin, New York. His lavish party in honor of himself draws more than 100 major crime figures. This gets the attention of state police who crash it and 20 arrests are made, including Genovese. This debacle causes Luciano to seek help from Gambino, who turns on Genovese with an anonymous call that imprisons him for 15 years for dealing heroin. Luciano got rid of his biggest rival and placed the organization he created in the hands of Gambino, the man he believes will lead the Mafia into the future. Gambino ushers in a new era, while Luciano enters a lasting relationship with Italian dancer Igea Lissoni. On January 26, 1962, three years after his beloved died, and having lived a life of no other, Charles "Lucky" Luciano dies of a heart attack in Naples at the age of 64. News of the kingpin's death spreads and hundreds line the streets to pay their respects to the man responsible for creating the modern mafia. Nearly 16 years after being deported, Lucky finally gets his wish of returning to America one last time, and is buried in St. John's Cemetery. Luciano's death signals the end of an era as one-by-one his original crew fades away into history. Genovese spends the rest of his life behind bars where he continues to run his crime family until he dies in 1969. Costello lives out his retirement in peace and passes away in 1973. Lansky retires to Miami Beach dying of old age in 1983 with only $37,000 to his name, but had millions in secret bank accounts. Luciano, Lansky, Costello, and Genovese, along with Bugsy Siegel left behind a legacy that forever changed America.

== Reception ==
The Making of the Mob: New York received mixed reviews from critics. On Metacritic, the series has a score of 59 out of 100, based on 6 reviews, indicating "mixed or average" reviews. On Rotten Tomatoes, the series has a rating of 40%, based on 5 reviews.

Brian Lowry of Variety writes, "The Making of the Mob: New York will merely remind fans of quality drama how much they miss Boardwalk Empire. The dialogue is generally muted underneath the narration and a positively abusive musical score, which never approximates anything less than a swelling crescendo."

Kyle Anderson of Entertainment Weekly writes, "While the presentation can get a little stilted, Making is a relatively clear-eyed look at a still-gripping mutation of the American dream."
