= Crackhead (TV series) =

- Genre: Comedy
- Created by: Holly Shervey
- Showrunner: Holly Shervey
- Directed by: Emmett Skilton
- Starring: Holly Shervey; Ana Scotney; Tania Nolan
- Country of origin: New Zealand
- Original language: English
- No. of seasons: 1
- No. of episodes: 8

Production
- Producers: Philippa Rennie; Emma White; Britta Hawkins; Tina McLaren; Sam Shore
- Running time: 22 minutes
- Production company: Warner Bros International Television Production New Zealand (WBITVNZ)

Original release
- Network: Three (New Zealand); HBO Max (Australia)
- Release: 12 March – 16 April 2026

Crackhead is a New Zealand comedy television series created by Holly Shervey, and executive produced by Tina McLaren and Phillipa Rennie. It stars Shervey, Ana Scotney, Tania Nolan, Sara Wiseman, Miriama Smith, Arlo Green, Carmel-Maria Savaiinaea, and Bronwyn Bradley.

== Official synopsis ==
Drug-addicted party-animal Frankie has blown it all - her inheritance, her relationships, and most recently, her sister's husband. It's time to go to rehab.

== Cast and characters ==
- Holly Shervey as Frances "Frankie" Jones
- Ana Scotney as Lydia "L-Cat" Anahera Turei
- Tania Nolan as Emma Solomon
- Sara Wiseman as Ana Abrams
- Miriama Smith as Isabella "Bella" Horua
- Arlo Green as Edward "E-Man" Kirk
- Carmel-Maria Savaiinaea as Matty "Bumblebee" Vali
- Mark Mitchinson as Graham "Gramp" Collins
- Ally Xue as Georgia "Gorging Georgia" Liu
- Erroll Shand as Mike Reynolds
- Dominic Ona-Ariki as Rawiri Solomon
- Bronwyn Bradley as Michelle Ferguson
- Katherine Kennard as Katherine Jones
- Ryan Carter as Tommy Lawson

== Episodes ==
No.	Title	Directed by	Written by	Original release date	Viewers (millions)
1	"We're All Mad Here"	Emmett Skilton	Holly Shervey	March 12, 2026	N/A
Following a drug-induced incident at a night club, Frankie is sentenced by a judge to 28 days at a drug rehabilitation centre called The Laast Resort in lieu of a prison sentence for killing someone. At The Laast Resort, inmates are subject to strict rules including a ban on sex, drugs and phones. While experiencing flashbacks of her estranged relationships with her sister Emma and step-mother Katherine Jones, Frankie navigates a volatile relationship with her roommate Lydia. Frankie is non-cooperative with the staff and resistant to treatment. After Lydia and the other inmates steal and burn her clothes in an improvised bonfire, Frankie attempts to flee the rehab centre but is stopped by Bella, who warns that she would be sent to prison if she leaves the programme.
2	"Running with scissors"	Emmett Skilton	Holly Shervey	March 12, 2026	N/A
Over the next two days, Frankie attempts to contact her sister Emma during her allocated phone session but Emma and her husband Rawiri Solomon are preoccupied with other matters. Defying the rehab centre's programme, Frankie refuses to eat a sandwich until she is threatened with being force-fed with a feeding tube. Frankie obtains drugs from Lydia, which turns out to be a powerful horse laxative which causes her to defecate on Edward Kirk's bed while having sex. In flashback scenes, Frankie is revealed to have had an affair with Rawiri. Following a drug overdose, Bella questions Frankie, who refuses to cooperate. Frankie is later stabbed in her left breast by Georgia, who has been secretly overdosing on drugs.
3	"To Pee or Not to Pee"	Emmett Skilton	Holly Shervey	March 12, 2026	N/A
Frankie survives her stabbing while Georgia is sent to a secure mental health facility. Later, Frankie raids the nurse's station and consumes a lot of drugs. The following day, the head nurse orders a search of the patients' rooms and threatens to punish all the patients unless the culprit surrenders themselves. Frankie gets Lydia to swap her urine sample during a drug test. Due to the defecation incident, Frankie is mocked by most of the other patients except Michelle Ferguson who is sympathetic to Frankie's plight since her daughter was stabbed. Due to the swapped urine test results, Dr Ana Abrams believes that Frankie is pregnant. Meanwhile, Emma is designated as the executor of her and Frankie's late father's will and receive a share of NZ$200,000. While Katherine is upset that her son Tommy Lawson has received a smaller share of his step-father's inheritance, he accepts his $30,000 share.
4	"Dirty work"	Emmett Skilton	Holly Shervey	March 19, 2026	N/A
Following Frankie's purported pregnancy diagnosis, Lydia becomes distraught because she does not want to become a mother. She attacks Frankie with a knife, prompting Frankie to be moved to Michelle's room. Emma later visits the clinic. While frustrated with her prodigal sister's behavior, she supports her decision to have a medical abortion and promises to give Frankie her share of the inheritance. Emma later tells Rawiri about Frankie's purported abortion, prompting him to confess to having an affair with Frankie. Frankie learns from Graham Collins and a Google search that Michelle was sent to the Laast Resort after killing her daughter.
5	"Comfortably numb"	Emmett Skilton	Holly Shervey	March 26, 2026	N/A
Frankie tries to mend bridges with Lydia by offering to share her abortion medication. However, Michelle has stolen Frankie's pills due to her anti-abortion beliefs. During a struggle, Michelle swallows the pills and experiences a mental breakdown, prompting the asylum staff to place her in an induced coma. During a group therapy session involving Graham's estranged wife Vicki and their daughter, Lydia and the other patients misbehave, prompting its cancellation. Unable to access the abortion medication, Lydia self harms in an attempt to induce an abortion. Concerned about her safety, Frankie alerts the staff about Lydia's pregnancy. The following day, Frankie and the other patients are having a small party which is interrupted by a body falling past the window revealed to be Graham who has committed suicide following the breakdown of his marriage with Vicki. Meanwhile, Emma is furious with Rawiri, who confesses to having a drunken affair with Frankie.
6	"Where is My Mind?"	Emmett Skilton	Holly Shervey	April 2, 2026	N/A
Following Graham's suicide, the schizophrenic Edward is reprimanded by Bella for screening a movie that had upset Graham prior to his death and Edward gets emotional stating the movie’s character never actually committed suicide and showing sadness over Graham’s death. Bella confronts Dr Abrams about experimenting with patients' medication while a male staffer convinces them to get the patients to clean windows in order to save costs. Following a confrontation, Frankie reconciles with a grieving Lydia, who is affected by Graham's death. Frankie misleads Bella and Emma into believing she has an abortion-induced miscarriage. Bella grows suspicious of Frankie's purported pregnancy. Frankie and Lydia later sneak out to a night club where the two take drugs and relapse. Frankie later discovers an overdosed Lydia in the toilet.
7	"Dance with the Devil"	Emmett Skilton	Holly Shervey	April 9, 2026	N/A
Following Lydia's overdose, Frankie is detained in an isolation unit. Dr Abrams convinces the facility's manager and staff to give Frankie a second chance since she has 13 days left in her programme. Abrams also has an ulterior motive in covering up the side effects of her experimental therapies. Frankie takes part in a group exercise which involves the patients making bouquets of flowers to help deal with past trauma. Lydia recovers from her overdose and rejoins the community. A male nurse named Mike Reynolds confesses to having an affair with Lydia that got her pregnant. Emma orders Rawiri to leave their home before Frankie's return. Frankie also works with Abrams in dealing with repressed memories from her childhood. During a meeting involving Abrams and Emma, Frankie appears to remember past memories of Emma being sexually abused by her step-brother Tommy.
8	"If the strait jacket fits"	Emmett Skilton	Holly Shervey	April 16, 2026	N/A
Emma convinces Frankie to cover up her abuse by their step-brother. Frankie makes progress with her treatment with Dr Abrams, disclosing that she unintentionally caused the death of a clown while driving under the influence of alcohol. On her last night, Frankie is invited by Lydia to a secret farewell party. The following day, Frankie is accused of raiding the nurse's station. She informs the staff of the secret farewell party and the other inmates are forced to clean the toilets as punishment. During the court hearing, the facility's lead doctor argues against Frankie's release on the grounds of her relapse, misbehaviour and delusions. When Emma supports the doctor's recommendation that Frankie be sentenced to a year at the Laast Resort, she tries to attack her sister but is restrained and returned to a secure wing of the facility. She encounters Georgia, who is held in the cell opposite her.

== Production ==
Crackhead was created and co-written by Holly Shervey, who also starred as the protagonist Frankie. It drew upon Shervey's personal experience in psychiatric care in 2010. The series was directed by Emmett Skilton, produced by Britta Hawkins, line produced by Sharron Jackson, and executively produced by Tina McLaren, Philippa Rennie, Sam Shore and Emma White for Warner Bros International Television Production New Zealand (WBITVNZ). It was commissioned by Three TV channel, a subsidiary of Sky Network Television.

In July 2024, WBITVNZ was allocated NZ$3,197,306 (US$1.89 million) by the broadcasting funding body NZ On Air to produce eight 22-minute episodes for Crackhead.

Besides Shervey, other cast members included Ana Scotney as Lydia, Miriama Smith as Bella, Arlo Green, Tania Nolan, Mark Mitchinson, Ally Xue, Erroll Shand, Dominic Ona-Ariki and Bronwyn Bradley. In addition, Peter Elliott made a cameo appearance as a judge in the first and last episodes.

== Release ==
Crackhead was released in New Zealand on 12 March 2026 through the Three television channel and streaming app ThreeNow. In Australia, the series was distributed by HBO Max.

== Reception ==
=== Critical reception ===
Karl Puschmann of Radio New Zealand gave Crackhead a positive review. He wrote:

With its kinetic direction and raw, lived-in script, Crackhead expertly balances harrowing emotion with pitch-black humour. It's a potent dose of television that leaves you constantly wanting more.

James Croot of TV Guide and The Press gave the series a positive review, praising the performances of cast members Shervey, Smith, Arlo Green, Mark Mitchinson, Erroll Shand, Dominic Ona-Ariki, and Peter Elliott. He compared the series to adult-oriented television series like Californication and The Big C and said that it added more variety to the police procedural-dominated New Zealand drama television genre.

Tara Ward of The Spinoff gave Crackhead a positive review, describing it as "raw, dark television with a seethingly funny bite to it, a show that gets comfortable with discomfort and never once wobbles. It is fast and fierce, dropping us straight into Frankie's chaotic world and refusing to let us out again." She praised showrunner Holly Shervey for immersing viewers into the world of the protagonist and for her portrayal of Frankie as a woman "hellbent on self-destruction." Ward also praised the performances of the other main cast members particularly Ana Scotney, Sara Wiseman and Miriama Smith. She liked the show's premise of exploring what was "really happening" at the asylum and Frankie grappling with the themes of trust and hope.

=== Accolades ===
During the 2026 New Zealand Screen Awards on 19 November 2026, Crackhead won four awards: "Best Performance by an Actor in a Female Role - Series" (Holly Shervey), "Best Performance by a Supporting Actor in a Female Role - Series" (Ana Scotney), "Best Editing - Drama Series" (Allanah Bazzard) and "Best Script - Series" (Holly Shervey).
