= Emmett Skilton =

New Zealand actor (born 1987)

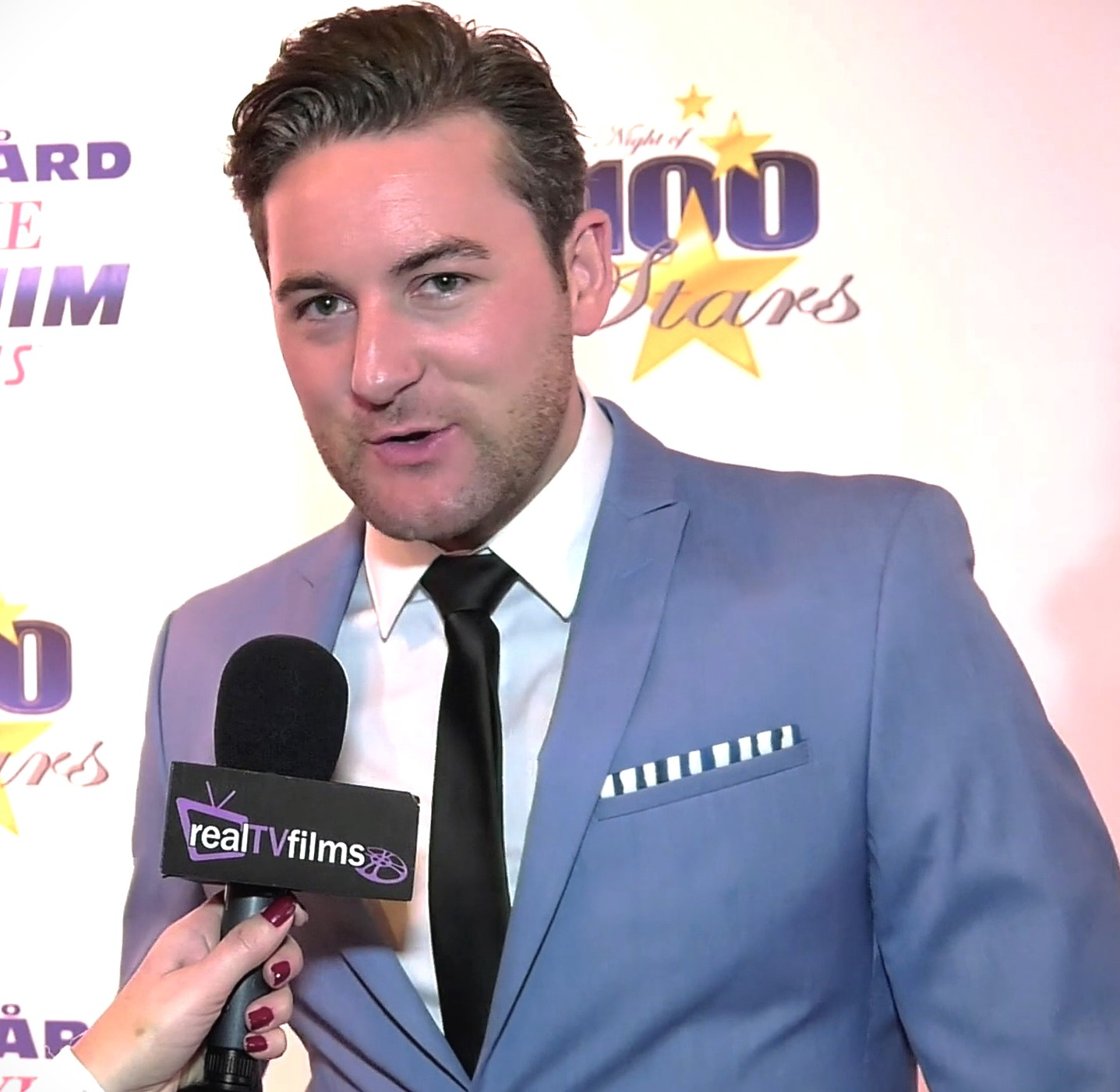
- Skilton in 2018
- Born: 23 September 1987 (age 38); Wellington, New Zealand
- Other name: Emmett Couling Skilton
- Occupation: Actor
- Years active: 2005–present
- Height: 6 ft 3 in (191 cm)
- Partner: Holly Shervey (2014–present)
- Children: 1
- Website: www.emmettskilton.com

Emmett Skilton (born 23 September 1987) is a New Zealand actor and director.

He played the lead character, Axl Johnson, in the comedy-drama, The Almighty Johnsons, and most recently had roles in Avatar: The Way of Water and American comedy series Young Rock, portraying Dwayne Johnson's real-life college football coach, Ed Orgeron.

== Early life ==
Emmett was born in Wellington, New Zealand. He grew up in Titahi Bay and attended Mana College, all in his home town of Titahi Bay. Emmett performed in the New Zealand Sheilah Winn Shakespeare Festival every year that he was at Mana College, and one year directed A Midsummer Night's Dream. In 2005 he was selected to attend the New Zealand Schools Shakespeare Production.

During high school, Emmett performed with improvisation troupe, Joe Improv, at Wellington's Capital E. New Zealand director Danny Mulheron saw Emmett perform and asked him to audition for the role of Willem in Seven Periods with Mr Gormsby. The following year he toured New Zealand and Sydney with the acting company The Ugly Shakespeare Company, before attending Toi Whakaari: New Zealand Drama School, in 2007.

== Career ==
=== Film and television ===
While studying at Toi Whakaari, Emmett starred in the feature film Home By Christmas, based on Gaylene Preston's family during WW2. He graduated at the end of 2009 with a Bachelor of Performing Arts in Acting and began starring as Axl Johnson in The Almighty Johnsons from 2010.

Emmett played real-life figures Sam Giancana in US series The Making of the Mob: Chicago in 2016 and Victor Lownes in American Playboy: The Hugh Hefner Story in 2017. He had a role, currently undefined, in James Cameron's Avatar: The Way of Water, The Sounds, New Zealand and Canadian co-production, Together Forever Tea, Amazon Prime's American Playboy: The Hugh Hefner Story.

Emmett recently starred in NBC's new single-camera comedy series, Young Rock, based on the life of Dwayne Johnson. Emmett portrays Johnson's former position coach at the University of Miami, former LSU head coach, Ed Orgeron.

=== Directing ===
From 2015 to 2017, Emmett produced and directed the comedy web series Auckward Love which centres around a young heartbroken girl in Auckland, New Zealand, in her quest to find love again from her not-so-useful best friends. He also directed the award-winning comedy series, Millennial Jenny, exclusively for Instagram TV in 2019 to present. Emmett co-directed Stan Harrington's Australian series, Legends, released in 2019.

He is a screen tutor at leading drama school The Actors Program and directed their 2017 and 2018 graduation films, Ripple and 13 Suspects, the latter written by The Almighty Johnsons co-creator Rachel Lang.

Most recently, Emmett has directed over 100 episodes of Shortland Street for TVNZ.

Emmett also directed the 2026 comedy television series Crackhead, which was created and written by his wife Holly Shervey, who also played the protagonist Frankie Jones. The series was distributed by Three in mid-March 2026.

== Filmography ==
=== Film ===
- A Mistake (2024) Alexander Colton
- Together Forever Tea (2021) Steve Slater
- Ablaze (2020) David Cody
- Shortland Street (2020) Ross Douglas
- James Patterson's Murder Is Forever (2018) Det. Derek Mois
- Into The Rainbow (2017) Tom Williams
- Every Little Thing (2016) Henry Thorougood
- Bella (2016) Connor Gregor
- The Last Train (2015) Louis
- We Feel Fine (2012) Roger
- Packed (2011) Darth Vader
- Shopping for One (2010) Dave
- Home By Christmas (2009) Tiny

=== Television ===
- Young Rock (2021) Coach Orgeron
- The Sounds (2020) Brendan
- Kino Ratten (2019) Officer Armand
- Power Rangers Beast Morphers (2019) Jax
- Power Rangers Super Ninja Steel (2018) Dreadwolf and Stabberous
- Dear Murderer (2017) Bruce Peterson
- American Playboy: The Hugh Hefner Story (2017) Victor Lownes
- The Brokenwood Mysteries (2017) Dr. Byron Cotter
- Power Rangers Dino Super Charge (2016) Professor Strickler
- The Making of the Mob: Chicago (2016) Sam Giancana
- Jono and Ben at Ten (2013) Guy Williams
- The Almighty Johnsons – Series 3 (2013) Axl Johnson
- Would I Lie To You? (2012) Himself
- The Almighty Johnsons – Series 2 (2012) Axl Johnson
- Aotearoa Film and Television Awards (2011) Himself
- The Almighty Johnsons – Series 1 (2011) Axl Johnson
- Time Trackers (2008) Ernest Rutherford
- The Investigator (2006) Brendan Easton
- Seven Periods with Mr Gormsby (2005) Willem van der Murren

=== Web ===
- D & D Logic (2022) Barbarian
- Millennial Jenny (2018-2023) Producer/Director
- Auckward Love (2015-2017) Producer/Director
- Gods Among Us on YouTube (2013) Axl Johnson

=== Theatre ===
- Between Two Waves (2015) Daniel Wells
- Stones in His Pockets (2014) Various
- Tribes (2012) Daniel
- Idiots 3D (2011) Francis Fox
- Paper Sky: A Love Story (2011–12) Henry
- Gagarin Way (2010) Tom

== Awards ==
- Best Acting Ensemble – NZ Webfest 2020
- Alumni Award – NZ Webfest 2020
- Best Director of a series – Seal Beach Film Festival 2019
- Best Director of an International Web-series – Melbourne Webfest 2016
- Best Screenplay for an International Web-series – Melbourne Webfeet 2016
- Nomination for 'Rising Star' Award – TV Guide Best of the Box 2012

== Personal life ==
In 2014, Skilton married actress and writer Holly Shervey. The two have a child who was born in 2026.
