= American Playboy: The Hugh Hefner Story =

American television series

- Genre: Political drama
- Directed by: Richard Lopez
- Starring: Matt Whelan; Emmett Skilton
- Country of origin: United States
- Original language: English
- No. of seasons: 1
- No. of episodes: 10 (list of episodes)

Production
- Executive producers: Stephen David; Peter Jaysen; Richard Rosenzweig
- Production locations: Auckland, New Zealand
- Cinematography: Milton Kam
- Running time: 38–46 minutes
- Production companies: Alta Loma Entertainment; Stephen David Entertainment

Original release
- Network: Amazon Prime Video
- Release: April 6, 2017

American Playboy: The Hugh Hefner Story is a 2017 television series by Amazon Prime Video. It stars Matt Whelan in the title role, along with Emmett Skilton and Chelsie Preston Crayford. Several African American and African British actors were linked to the program including Kelvin Taylor. The first season was released on 7 April 2017 and comprised ten episodes.

The series is a combination of interviews, archival footage (including moments found in Hefner's vast personal collection) and cinematic re-enactments that cover the launch of the magazine as well as the next six decades of Hefner's personal life and career. While building his empire, Hefner also devoted time to defending civil rights, freedom of speech and sexual freedom.

The series was filmed in Auckland, New Zealand.

Episode No	Name Of Episode	Description
1	Before the Bunny: Marilyn Monroe	
2	Birth of the Centerfold: The Girl Next Door	
3	Becoming Mr. Playboy	
4	Members Only: The Playboy Club	
5	The Playboy Interview	
6	Rebel with a Cause: Civil Liberties and Government Crackdowns	
7	Below the Belt: Playboy and the Pubic Wars	
8	Sex, Drugs and DEA Investigations	
9	Down the Rabbit Hole: The Dorothy Stratten Murder	
10	My Way	
