= The Almighty Johnsons =

New Zealand fantasy comedy/drama television series

- The Almighty Johnsons (L–R) Olaf, Ty, Axl, Mike and Anders
- Genre: Fantasy; Drama; Comedy
- Created by: James Griffin; Rachel Lang
- Starring: Emmett Skilton; Tim Balme; Dean O'Gorman; Jared Turner
- Opening theme: "Oh My" by Gin
- Country of origin: New Zealand
- Original language: English
- No. of series: 3
- No. of episodes: 36 (list of episodes)

Production
- Executive producers: James Griffin; Rachel Lang (series 1–2); Chris Bailey; John Barnett; Kelly Martin (series 3)
- Producer: Simon Bennett
- Cinematography: Marty Smith
- Running time: 43–45 minutes
- Production company: South Pacific Pictures

Original release
- Network: TV3
- Release: 7 February 2011 – 26 September 2013

The Almighty Johnsons is a New Zealand fantasy comedy/drama television series, which was created by James Griffin and Rachel Lang and was produced by South Pacific Pictures and aired from 7 February 2011 to 23 September 2013.

== Production ==
Funding for the first series was approved by NZ On Air in December 2009, a second series was approved in June 2011 and a third series was approved on 15 October 2012.

In December 2012, it was announced series three was in pre-production. Series 3 was the culmination of the search for Frigg.

=== Filming ===
Series two began filming in October 2011 and concluded in February 2012.

Series three began filming on 14 January 2013 and concluded on 9 May 2013.

=== Initial cancellation and fan campaign ===
On 6 September 2012, various members of the cast reported via Twitter that the show would not be renewed for a third season. This was confirmed by co-creator, James Griffin. Fan protests were launched immediately both in New Zealand and internationally, taking the form of an online petition, written complaints to TV3, and a 'send a twig to TV3' campaign (representing Yggdrasil, the mythical 'tree of life' from the show).

==== Second cancellation ====
The show's cancellation was announced in December 2013 via radio announcement on Radio New Zealand by TV3 programming boss Mark Caulton.

== Plot ==
The show follows a student named Axl Johnson, who on his 21st birthday discovers he and his family members are reincarnated Norse gods, whose powers are somewhat muted in their human form. It is up to Axl, who is the reincarnation of Odin, to restore their full powers and ensure the family's survival by finding the reincarnation of Odin's wife, Frigg. Matters are complicated by the presence of three Norse goddesses who are trying to find Frigg before the Johnsons do to prevent the restoration of the gods' full powers (which would vault them above the goddesses), as well as an antagonistic reincarnation of Norse god Loki, and the appearance of a Māori deity pantheon toward the end of the second series.

== Cast and characters ==
=== Johnson Family ===
Character (God/Goddess)	Actor	Notes
Axl Johnson (Odin)	Emmett Skilton, Siobhan Marshall (Female form, 1 episode)	The main character of the show. Axl was raised by Mike after their father left and mother walked out. He has shown a few abilities, strength, resistance to drugs and an instinctive battle sense as befitting a war god. He sought his soul-mate, the goddess Frigg, to restore the full powers of the Norse gods and goddesses. He is capable of taking on a female form.
Mikkel "Mike" Johnson (Ullr)	Tim Balme	The oldest of the Johnson brothers and also the wisest. Mike raised Axl, and feels responsible for them all, willing to risk debt to make good on his word. He is the god of the hunt and of games. He can track anything and wins any game between himself and an opponent, though not the stock market. Right after he got his powers, opponents in a pool game put his friend into a coma. After this traumatic incident, he believed that his powers brought more bad luck than good, and struggled to make ends meet without using his powers. He only realised his mistake and started using his powers after his friend woke fifteen years later.
Anders Johnson (Bragi)	Dean O'Gorman	The cocky brother, Anders is selfish, arrogant, and sleeps around. He manipulates others with his voice. He called off a fling with Michele after she was willing to sacrifice Mike's life for Axl to find Frigg. In series 2 Agnetha (the boys' mother) sent him to Norway on a quest for the tree of life, Yggdrasil.
Tyrone "Ty" Johnson (Höðr)	Jared Turner	Depressed over his isolation, Ty is shy and lonely. Initially the host of Höðr, he had the power of radiating cold. Ty could not feel warmth, and was unaffected by below-freezing temperatures, hence his job selling and repairing refrigerators, and hobby carving ice. At the end of Series 2, he achieves his goal of mortality by dying briefly and losing his god essence, revived by Michele. However, every mortal then forgets him, most importantly his beloved Dawn. In Season 3 Ty reveals that his powers of Höðr have returned, making him a god again (although he is able to control his powers, unlike when he first received them). Dawn seeing him use his powers causes her to remember all her time with him.
Olaf Johnson (Baldr)	Ben Barrington	The boys' grandfather is an oracle, but his diluted powers and years of drug use diminish his ability drastically. He is god of long life and rebirth, therefore looks more middle-aged than his true advanced age of 90s.
Agnetha (Freyja)	Alison Bruce	The leader of a band of goddesses who are intent on undermining the male gods' quest to regain their powers, believing goddesses are more capable of ruling. She is the goddess of fertility and prosperity. Born as Elizabet (played by Josephine Davison), she is the mother of the Johnson brothers. After she helped Mike become a god, she turned herself into a tree to not deal with the rest of her sons undergoing the same transition. After a few years, she got bored with tree life and transferred her essence to a woman who was killed right under her tree, becoming Agnetha. Her goddess powers allowed her to become very wealthy. After killing Ty's wife Eva in series two, she is sentenced to revert to a tree. Vengeful Loki takes advantage of the transformation and burns her forest down, so she is currently missing, presumed dead.
Johan "Joe" Johnson (Njörðr)	Stuart Devenie	The Johnsons' father who, due to his nature as Njörðr, always felt the call of the ocean and would often leave his family for extended periods of time. Eventually he stopped returning altogether and left his family to their own devices. Karen (Michele's mother) met Joe at a bar and the two returned to her daughter's home where they had sex. During a brief interlude in their intercourse, Joe went into the kitchen for a drink, where Mike happened to be with Michele, and the two were surprised to see each other.

=== Goddesses ===
Character (Goddess)	Actor	Notes
Hanna Larsen (Frigg)	Siobhan Marshall	Hanna is the human incarnation of Frigg, Axl's pre-destined soul mate that if his love is accepted, would cause all the gods and goddesses to regain their powers at full strength. Hanna is currently working at a bridal boutique (as Frigg is the goddess of marriage). However, due to Mike's insistence that he can become Odin, he is able to meet Hanna a few minutes before Axl in an attempt to convince her to choose him (even though he is actually Ullr). Her father Fredrick and brother Martin are also gods Hoenir and Heimdallr, respectively. Note: Introduced in series 3. The actress Siobhan Marshall also played Mia, Axl's feminine form, in a series 2 episode.
Gaia (Iðunn)	Keisha Castle-Hughes	Axl's flatmate, a nurse. She and Axl love each other but do not realise their feelings at first. After a one-night stand with him, Gaia believed Axl had just used her, so she left. Her adoptive father and former boyfriend imprisoned her inexplicably, so she returned. Series 2 reveals that her real parents were gods, so she will become a goddess at age 21. In the series 2 finale, Gaia's goddess ceremony is botched because god-slayer Natalie killed Helen [the original Iðunn]. Instead of becoming either Frigg or Maori Papatuanuku, she becomes Iðunn, as Iðunn has to exist for any of the gods to exist.
Ingrid (Snotra)	Rachel Nash	Goddess of prudence and wisdom and oracle of Agnetha's band of goddesses has an analogous role to that of Olaf amongst the Johnsons. Ingrid researches genealogy of potential Norse gods and goddesses in their quest to reach Frigg before Odin does, and translates. She sleeps, drinks, and takes drugs with Olaf, consequently revealing more than the other goddesses would like.
Michele (Sjöfn)	Michelle Langstone	One of Agnetha's band of goddesses, Sjöfn is the goddess of love, bisexual, lusty, and mischievous. Michele is a family physician in the local hospital, able to heal with a branch from the tree of life, Yggdrasil. She flirted with Anders, lived with Colin, but ended up with Mike. During Season 3, her relationship with Mike begins to unravel, in part because he disapproves of her using Yggdrasil to heal mortals (and earn money) and in part because she disapproves of him believing himself to be Odin. When she stumbles upon him and Hanna together, she later attempts to kill Hanna in order to prevent the gods from using the goddesses as "playthings" if everyone's powers return. However, Martin sensed the danger and struck Michele over the head with a hammer, and seemingly killed her. She was resurrected in part by Hanna, with the circumstance that when Sjofn returned to Asgard with the rest of the Aesynjur, Michele would die. After the ascension of the gods to Asgard, Odin remembered Axl's promise to Michele and resurrected her fully.
Stacey (Fulla)	Eve Gordon	One of the band of goddesses and Frigg's handmaiden. She is a bike courier and general dogsbody, sent on errands. She leaves Agnetha to serve Eva, because her nature demands she serve a goddess. She ended a few days fling with Zeb when Michele's spell wore off. Mike promised her money from Agnetha's inheritance to purchase the courier business she worked for, which she received and ran. (She was the only goddess to receive her inheritance; Loki bugged and monitored Mike's bar as he was investing the money, then took advantage of the Johnsons temporarily losing their powers to steal it. She was the only goddess to have presented a valid plan to Mike at that time and therefore was granted what little remained.)
Karen (Lofn)	Jennifer Ward-Lealand	Michele's mother who is also a party planner, although loves throwing god parties. She and Michele have a strained relationship, in part due to Michele becoming a "minor goddess." She eventually begins a relationship with Joe Johnson, the Johnson boys' father.
Suzie (Sága)	Colleen Davis	Suzie is a barmaid from Whangamaungamoa, and unbeknownst to herself, she is the goddess Sága. Both of Suzie's parents died in an accident when she was a child, so there was no one to inform or prepare her for her 21st birthday. When she turned 21 she saw what she thought were fireworks in the sky when Sága joined with her. Due to her nature as Sága, she always worries about Derrick (as Sága and Thor were best friends).
Eva Gundersen (Hel)	Brooke Williams	A goth musician who Stacey finds working in a butchery. Stacey and Michele, then Axl and Anders, see her perform at a dingy bar, sense her divinity, and believe her to be Frigg. However, she is Hel, the goddess of the underworld, and Colin Gundersen's daughter. She marries Ty in the series 1 finale. When she endangers Ty, Agnetha makes her deliberate death look like an accident.
Helen Larvig (Iðunn)	Sara Wiseman	Helen was the initial incarnation of Idun, and met Ty in her bar. Ty ended their affair when Olaf said Idun is forever doomed to have a relationship with Bragi (Anders) that never ends well. Unfortunately, she still meets Anders and demands more sex than he can fulfill. Because god-slayer Natalie kills her when coming for Anders, Gaia is possessed at her 21st birthday ceremony by Iðunn instead of Frigg or Papatuanuku as expected.

=== Gods ===
Character (God)	Actor	Notes
Colin Gundersen (Loki)	Shane Cortese	Colin is an eccentric and prosperous lawyer, and the estranged father of Eva. As the god Loki, he is a trickster god and the God of Fire. He secretly allied with Agnetha in series 1. When he contracts that a Johnson will marry his daughter, or Mike will die, Ty marries Eva to save Axl. When Agnetha is sentenced to live as a tree for murdering Eva, Loki burns down her forest, hoping to kill her.
Derrick Hansen (Thor)	Geoff Dolan	Derrick is a goat farmer, but not a very good one. He loves beer, his trusty hammer, Mjollnir, and his daughter Delphine. He becomes depressed when his farm begins to fail and his daughter gets married and moves out, but a visit from Axl rejuvenates him.
Kvasir	Michael Hurst	Kvasir is the wisest of all the gods, and has the annoying compulsion to answer any question another god asks him. He is homeless (and has never given his mortal name) but eventually ends up living under Mike's bar.
Frederick Larsen (Hœnir)	unknown actor	Fredrick Larson is the human incarnation of Hœnir, and also the father of Frigg. However, due to a head injury, he is rendered unable to speak and subsequently placed in an assisted living home. By the time Ingrid, Axl, and Zeb find him (with the help of Yggdrasil), he is a very old man.
Martin Larsen (Heimdallr)	Matthew J. Saville	Martin is the son of Fredrick (Hœnir) and the brother of Hanna (Frigg). His powers include teleportation between realms and locations and wisdom. These come into play when Mike (in an attempt to claim Frigg for his own) finds the Larsen house and tried to meet Frigg before Axl can. Martin uses his powers to continually send him back to the bar and lay traps to keep Mike from finding Frigg, as he knows that Mike is not meant for her.

=== Other Mythicals ===
Character	Actor	Notes
Bryn	John Leigh	Bryn is an exceptionally short giant (jötunn) who, after hearing of a prophecy of a child who would kill all giants, was chosen to go to New Zealand to kill the baby girl since his small size would help him blend in. However, when Bryn laid eyes upon the girl, he felt as though he couldn't do it. Noting that her parents (the gods Tyr and Apakura) were terrible people who didn't deserve to have a child, before taking the girl away with a vow to protect her, while reporting that he had killed her. Bryn moved to Waiheke Island, named the girl Gaia and made arrangements for legal documents that would indicate she was older than she was.
Jacob	Arthur Meek	Jacob is an exceptionally tall dwarf, secretly working with Bryn to protect Gaia, after previously pretending to be her boyfriend.
Eggthér	Oliver Driver	Eggthér is a giant (jötunn) who comes looking for Gaia during the second season.
Jerome (Māui)	Matariki Whatarau	Jerome is the reincarnation of Māui, the Māori god of fishing, and Māori trickster. He seeks Gaia's hand in marriage, as he believes her to be the Papatuanuku.
Leon (Rongo)	Tainui Tukiwaho	Leon is the reincarnation of Rongo, the Māori god of agriculture and crops. He lives in the House of Jerome, with Jerome.
George (Punga)	Kirk Torrance	George is the reincarnation of Punga, the Māori father of all things ugly. He lives in the House of Jerome, with Jerome.

=== Mortals ===
Character	Actor	Notes
Valerie Johnson	Roz Turnbull	Married to Mike, she endured hormone treatment for in vitro fertilisation to have a child. She was the fiancée of Mike's best friend Rob, until Rob went into a coma after a bar fight. When Rob woke fifteen years later, he impregnated her in an affair. Realizing Valerie and Rob were still in love, Mike decides on divorce.
Zeb	Hayden Frost	Axl's other flatmate, and best friend. Loyal but impulsive, he is reckless and does not consider consequences. After discovering the truth about the Johnsons and their lives as gods, he assigns himself the role of Freki and risks the wrath of destiny, and Mike, by his mortal involvement in 'god business'. Mortals are forbidden to be present at god ceremonies.
Dawn	Fern Sutherland	Dawn is Anders' secretary and runs his PR company. She does not realise Anders' persuasion keeps her working too hard. She dated Ty until he accidentally froze her, and gave her up. In his mortal form, she cannot remember him. Anders exploits her at work, but has not slept with her. When she sees Ty using his returned god powers, she regains her memories of Ty. Ty eventually tells her about the gods and goddesses, and which due to her knowledge makes Anders unable to use his powers on her.

== Series overview ==
Series	Episodes	Originally released		Rating	Average viewership (in millions)
Series	Episodes	First released	Last released	Rating	Average viewership (in millions)
1	10	7 February 2011	11 April 2011	9.8	1.64
2	13	29 February 2012	23 May 2012	—N/a	—N/a
3	13	4 July 2013	26 September 2013	—N/a	—N/a

== Reception ==
Series 1 holds a "100% fresh" rating at Rotten Tomatoes, critics giving 8 out of 10 points, and 88% from audiences.

== Awards and nominations ==
=== Aotearoa Film & Television Awards ===
Year	Award	Category	Nominee	Result	Ref
2011	General Television Award	Best Performance by a Supporting Actress	Fern Sutherland	Nominated	
2011	General Television Award	Images & Sound Best Editing Drama/Comedy	Bryan Shaw	Nominated	
2011	General Television Award	Best Original Music	Sean Donnelly & Victoria Kelly	Nominated	

=== New York Festivals ===
Year	Award	Category	Nominee	Result	Ref
2012	Finalist Certificate	Best Writing	James Griffin (for "Every Good Quest Has a Sacrifice")	Won	
2013	Finalist Certificate	Drama	Simon Bennett, James Griffin, Rachel Lang, Chris Bailey and John Barnett	Won	

=== Rialto Channel New Zealand Film Awards ===
Year	Award	Category	Nominee	Result	Ref
2013	Television Award	NZ On Air Best Television Feature or Drama Series	The Almighty Johnsons	Nominated	

=== Sir Julius Vogel Award ===
Year	Award	Category	Nominee	Result	Ref
2012	Professional Award	Best Dramatic Presentation	The Almighty Johnsons	Won	
2013	Professional Award	Best Dramatic Presentation	The Almighty Johnsons	Nominated	
2014	Professional Award	Best Dramatic Presentation	The Almighty Johnsons	Nominated	

=== SWANZ ===
Year	Category	Nominee	Result	Ref
2012	Best Television Episode: Drama Script	James Griffin (for "A Damn Fine Woman")	Won	
2013	Best TV Drama Episode	Natalie Medlock and James Griffin (for "Playing God")	Nominated	
2013	Best TV Drama Episode	James Griffin (for "Typical Auckland God")	Nominated	
2014	Best Television Drama Episode	James Griffin (for "The End of the World as We Know It")	Nominated	

== Home video releases ==
The first series of The Almighty Johnsons has been released in New Zealand, the United Kingdom, Australia and the United States. The second series has been released in New Zealand and the United Kingdom. The third series has been released in New Zealand, the United Kingdom, and the United States. The complete series 1-3 box set was released in the United States on 28 April 2015.

== Broadcast ==
Series one premiered in Australia on Network Ten on 19 December 2011, airing at 10:30 p.m. on Mondays, and on Sci Fi Channel on 26 February 2012, airing at 6:30 p.m. on Sundays, in Canada on SPACE on 23 July 2012, airing at 9:00 p.m. on Mondays, and in the United Kingdom on Syfy on 2 February 2012, airing at 10:00 p.m. on Thursdays.

Series two premiered in Australia on Network Ten on 21 December 2012, airing at 9:30 p.m. on Fridays, and on SF on 22 March 2013, airing at 9:30 p.m. on Fridays, in Canada on SPACE on 14 January 2013, airing at 10:00 p.m. on Mondays, and in the United Kingdom on Syfy on 17 September 2012, airing at 10:00 p.m. on Mondays.

Series three premiered in Canada on SPACE on 4 July 2013, at 9:00 p.m., the same day as the New Zealand premiere, and in the United Kingdom on Syfy on 28 August 2013, airing at 10:00 p.m. on Wednesdays.

Series one began broadcasting in the United States on 11 July 2014 on Syfy, with series two set to follow. According to the review site Common Sense Media, the Syfy broadcasts are somewhat censored, with nudity blurred out.

In the Republic of Ireland the show airs on TG4.

The complete series was available on Netflix in some countries, including the United States, Canada, Australia.

The series can also be viewed in the UK on Amazon prime video.

As of January 2022 full series can be viewed on Tubi.
