= 20th century in the United States =

The 20th century in the United States refers to the period in the United States from 1901 through 2000 in the Gregorian calendar. For information on this period, see:

- History of the United States series:
  - History of the United States (1865–1918)
  - History of the United States (1918–1945)
  - History of the United States (1945–1964)
  - History of the United States (1964–1980)
  - History of the United States (1980–1991)
  - History of the United States (1991–2016)
- Historical eras:
  - Progressive Era
  - United States in World War I
  - Roaring Twenties
  - Great Depression in the United States
  - United States in World War II
  - Cold War
  - Civil rights era
  - Reagan era

== See also ==
- 20th century
